= Khabirat Kafidipe =

Nigerian actress

Kabirah Kafidipe
- Born: Abeokuta, Ogun, Nigeria
- Education: Olabisi Onabanjo University (Mass communication)
- Occupations: actress; producer; director
- Years active: 1996–present
- Known for: Dazzling Mirage; The Narrow Path; Iwalewa; The White Handkerchief

Kabirah Kafidipe is a Nigerian film actress, director and producer. She is popularly known as “Araparegangan” for her role in Saworoide, a 1999 Nigerian film produced and directed by Tunde Kelani.

== Early life ==
Kafidipe was born on July 29. She is a native of Ikereku, a town in Abeokuta, the capital of Ogun State, southwestern Nigeria. She attended Abeokuta Girls Grammar School where she obtained the West Africa School Certificate before she proceeded to Olabisi Onabanjo University, where she received a bachelor's degree in Mass communication.

== Career ==
Kabirah's first film appearance was in The White Handkerchief, a short film adapted from The Virgin, a debut novel of Bayo Adebowale, produced and directed by Tunde Kelani but came into limelight when she featured in Saworoide (brass bells), a 1999 Nigerian film that starred Kunle Afolayan, Peter Fatomilola, Kola Oyewo, Yemi Shodimu. She later featured in a 2004 Nigerian film, titled The Campus Queen, The Narrow Path, a 2006 film that starred Sola Asedeko, Beautiful Nubia, directed by Tunde Kelani and produced by Mainframe Films and Television Productions. Her lead role in Iwalewa, a 2006 Nigerian film fetched her the Africa Movie Academy Awards of Best Actress in a Leading Role. She starred in Dazzling Mirage, a 2014 Nigerian drama film, produced and directed by Tunde Kelani; it stars Kunle Afolayan, Bimbo Manuel, Yomi Fash Lanso, Taiwo Ajai Lycett. She produced a film titled, Bintu which was premiered in R & A Hotel at Opebi in Ikeja, Lagos State.

== Filmography ==
Year	Title	Role	Written
1999	The White Handkerchief		Tunde Kelani
1999	Saworoide		Tunde Kelani
1999	Brass Bells	Araparegangan	Tunde Kelani
2002	Agogo Eewo	Arapa	Akinwunmi Isola
2004	The Campus Queen	Tolu	Tunde Kelani
2006	The Narrow Path	Peju	Tunde Kelani
2006	Iwalewa	Iwalewa	Aisha and Kabirah Kafidipe
2008	Arugba	Morenike	Tunde Kelani
2014	Dazzling Mirage	Tade	Tunde Kelani
2015	Bintu		Kabirah Kafidipe
2016	The Seed		Joseph Jaiyeoba
2024	Eman		
2024	Invisible Luggage		Kabirah Kafidipe
