= List of Nigerian films of 1994 =

This is a list of Nigerian films released in 1994.

== Films ==
| Title | Director | Cast | Genre | Notes | Ref |
|---|---|---|---|---|---|
1994
| Ayo Ni Mo Fe | Tunde Kelani | Yomi Ogunmola Bola Obot Yinka Oyedijo Kareem Adepoju Lere Paimo | Drama | Produced by Mainframe Films and Television Productions The movie was made in 2 parts | |
| Glamour Girls | Chika Onukwufor | Eucharia Anunobi Zack Orji Liz Benson Dolly Unachukwu Gloria Alozie | Drama | Produced Kenneth Nnebue (NEK Films) This movie brought Eucharia Anunobi and Zack Orji into the limelight. Zack Orji was suspended by his church for a controversial scene in the movie. | |
| Lagos Na Wah!!: Pidgin Comedy 1-3 | Kehinde Soaga | James Iroha Sunday Omobolanle Kayode Odumosu Jide Kosoko | Comedy | Shot in Pidgin Released on VHS by Topway Productions | |
| Nneka, the Pretty Serpent 1 and 2 | Zeb Ejiro Bolaji Dawodu | Ndidi Obi Okechukwu Ogunjiofor Rita Nzelu Kanayo O. Kanayo | | Shot in Igbo Language Released on VHS by Gabosky and Videosonic | |

== See also ==
- List of Nigerian films
