= List of Nigerian films of 2006 =

This is a list of Nigerian films released in 2006.

== Films ==
Title	Director	Cast	Genre	Notes	Ref
2006
30 Days	Mildred Okwo	Genevieve Nnaji Joke Silva Segun Arinze	Action / thriller	This film received 10 nominations at the Africa Movie Academy Awards in 2008, including Best Picture, Best Art Direction, Best Screenplay, Best Edit, Best Costumes and Best Sound.	
Abeni	Tunde Kelani	Kareem Adepoju Samuel Ajirebi Moufoutaou Akadiri Jide Kosoko|| Romance||This film received 11 nominations and won three awards at the Africa Movie Academy Awards in 2007, including Best Cinematography and Best Sound.			
Games Men Play	Lancelot Oduwa Imasuen	Kate Henshaw-Nuttal Ini Edo Chioma Chukwuka Chinedu Ikedieze Kalu Ikeagwu Jim Iyke	Drama	Shot in English Language, with 4 hours 55 minutes runtime	
Girls Cot 1-3. 2006	Afam Okereke	Genevieve Nnaji Rita Dominic Ini Edo Uche Jombo	Drama	Shot in English Released on DVD by Simony/Sanga	
Manko	Alhaji Sagir Mohammed	Yahaya Alfa Abdullahi Mohamed Bida John Gana Muwo Jibrin Yinkagi		Nupe Language film	
Mr Lecturer	Prince Emeka Ani	Nkem Owoh Sam Loco Efe Stella Ikwuegbu Chidinma Aneke		Shot in English and Pidgin. Released on VCD by Konia Concepts	
Night in the Philippines 1 and 2	Zeb Ejiro	Desmond Elliot Ibinabo Fiberesima Marie Eboka Ufoma Ejenobor		Shot in English Language Released on VCD by Zeb Ejiro Pro ductions/Movieland Network	
Sitanda	Izu Ojukwu	Stephanie Okereke Iretiola Doyle Akume Akume Gloria Adeyemi || Adventure / drama ||			
The Amazing Grace	Jeta Amata	Joke Silva Nick Moran Scott Cleverdon		This film received 11 nominations at the Africa Movie Academy Awards in 2007.	
The Narrow Path	Tunde Kelani	Sola Asedeko Seyi Fasuyi Eniola Olaniyan Ayo Badmus		Shot in Yoruba Language. Released in Nigeria and Benin Republic by Mainframe	
This Is Nollywood	Robert Caputo, Franco Sacchi	Bond Emeruwa	Documentary	About the Nollywood industry	

== See also ==
- List of Nigerian films
