= Efunsetan Aniwura (film) =

2005 Nigerian historical film

- Directed by: Tunde Kelani
- Written by: Akinwunmi Ishola
- Produced by: Funmi Holder
- Release date: 2005
- Country: Nigeria
- Language: Yoruba

Efunsetan Aniwura is a 2005 Nigerian historical film about a heroine based in Abeokuta. it was produced by Funmi Holder, directed by Tunde Kilani, and written by Akinwunmi Ishola.

== Premier ==
The film premiered on 31 January 2005 in Cinemas.

== Cast ==
- Kareem Adepoju
- Said balogun
- Deji Aderemi
- Iyabo Ogunsola as Efunsetan Aniwura
- Kola Oyewo
- Jinadu Ewele
- Laide Adewale

== Synopsis ==
Efunsetan Aniwura loses her child after struggling to be a successful woman, as a custodian of many slaves. This leads to her being harsh on them and no one can withstand her heartlessness. After some years, she commits suicide.

== Award ==
The film was nominated for Best International Narrative at the Annual ABFF Jury Awards.

== See also ==
- Akinwunmi isola
- Efunsetan Aniwura
- Koseegbe
