= The White Handkerchief =

1998 film by Tunde Kelani

- Directed by: Tunde Kelani
- Written by: Tunde Kelani; Akinwunmi Isola
- Produced by: Tunde Kelani
- Starring: Yemi Komolafe; Yemi Shodimu; Khabirat Kafidipe
- Cinematography: Tunde Kelani
- Edited by: Kehinde Aje; Moji Bamtefa
- Music by: Beautiful Nubia
- Production companies: Mainframe Film and Television Productions
- Distributed by: Mainframe Film and Television Productions
- Release date: 1998
- Running time: 17 minutes
- Country: Nigeria
- Language: English

The White Handkerchief is a 1998 short Nigerian film produced and directed by Tunde Kelani and starring Yemi Komolafe, Yemi Shodimu, and Khabirat Kafidipe. The film was adapted from The Virgin, a debut novel of Bayo Adebowale.

== Plot summary ==
The film tells the story of a young village girl called Awero, played by Sola Asedeko, who lost her virginity as a result of rape before she met her childhood love, called Odejimi, whom she decides to marry. Odejimi must use a white handkerchief to evidence the virginal blood of Awero on their wedding night as required by tradition. Odejimi is disappointed when no blood is produced, and this results in a war between the villagers of Awero and Odejimi.

== Cast ==
- Sola Asedeko
- Idowu Philips
- Khabirat Kafidipe
- Yemi Shodimu as Odejimi
- Akinwunmi Isola
- Yemi Akomolafe as Awero
- Yinka Akanbi as Lapade
- Kemi Akanni as Odejimi's Aunt
- Abiodun Aleja as Dauda
- Moji Bamtefa as Awero's Mother
- Lai Karounwi as Awero's Father
