= Efunsetan Aniwura =

Ìyálóde of Ìbàdàn

Ẹfúnṣetán Aníwúrà
- Ìyálóde of Ibadan.

Ìyálóde of Ibadan.
- Reign: 1867 – May 1, 1874
- Coronation: 1867
- Predecessor: Iyalode Subuola
- Successor: Iyalode Iyaola
- Born: c. 1820s Abeokuta
- Died: June 30, 1874; Ibadan
- Issue: 1 (daughter, died 1860)
- Father: Ogunrin

Ẹfúnṣetán Aníwúrà (c. 1820s – June 30, 1874) was the second Iyalode of Ibadan and one of the pre-eminent slave traders in the 19th-century Ibadan. Revered as a successful merchant and trader, her impact encompassed the political, military, economic, and religious spheres of Ibadan. She was famous for being arguably the most powerful and, certainly, one of the wealthiest - Yoruba women that ever lived. She has been described by historians as an authoritarian leader who often utilized capital punishment on erring slaves. This has been attributed to psychological breakdown resulting from the death of her only daughter and her inability to procreate afterwards.

== Personal life ==
Born in Ikija-Egba in the 1820s, Aniwura's family moved to Ibadan after the fall of Ikija in the 1820s. Her father, Chief Ogunrin, was a warlord from Ikija, while her mother was from Ile-Ife. Her entrepreneurial drive was reported as an inheritance from her mother, who was a petty trader. Aniwura's regular visit to the market alongside her mother further enhanced her achievement as a trader. She was married multiple times and had a child, whom she lost at birth. This event has been the subject of numerous historical writings and has been attributed to influencing the latter parts of her life, both positively (in terms of focus) and negatively (in terms of ruthlessness).

== Rise and fall ==
According to Olawale Idowu, Aniwura's decision to migrate to Ibadan was mainly for two reasons: firstly, at the time, her cousin was a prominent leader in the city. Secondly, due to the enterprising nature of the town (Ibadan) at the time, in comparison to other locations, she could start a successful business there. She was reported to have had about two thousand slaves and multiple farms, exporting agricultural produce to Porto-Novo, Badagry and Ikorodu. Her major lines of trade were tobacco and slave trading. She also manufactured a local cosmetic product, Kijipa, that was transported to America for use. Her difficulty in child-bearing was the basis for her diligence in business, even though the adverse effect was her emotional instability, as having a successor was a major determinant of affluence at that time. She was often depressed, and it became evident in her style of leadership. She maintained that no slave in her household should get pregnant or get anyone pregnant and instituted death as the penalty for defaulters. Isola (2010) revealed that during her lifetime, she had ordered the decapitation of 41 of her slaves for flouting her rules.

By the 1860s, she was made the second Iyalode of Ibadan. She was also made a patron of the Anglican Church in Ibadan for her involvement in strengthening Christianity in the community. Her great nephew Rev. Daniel Olubi was an Anglican clergyman at the time, she supported him in the ministry.

She was deposed as Iyalode by Aare Latoosa on May 1, 1874, for politically motivated allegations, despite paying all the fines levied against her.

Her authority within the community and opposition to the political views of the Ibadan de facto ruler, the Aare Ona Kakanfo (war-lord) Latoosa, led him to plot to execute her. This proved to be difficult due to her political position among the high chiefs. He paid-off Kumuyilo, her adopted son, to betray her and lead her to the place of execution. There are many theories on why Latoosa wanted Aniwura out of Ibadan. While some felt it was motivated by sexism and jealousy, other historians believe that it was simply because the city became too dependent on her, especially for military equipment, which was gotten on credit. Some writers argue that her failure to abide by the regulations of the Aare was what led him to get angry with her.

== Death ==
Aniwura was killed in her sleep by two of her slaves in 1874. They had been instructed to do so by her adopted son, Kumuyilo. Kumuyilo was, in turn, bribed by Aare Latoosa, the ruler of Ibadan at the time. The motivation was posited to be that Latoosa felt threatened by her wealth and disobedience towards him.

== Legacy ==
Chief Aniwura got mainstream attention after being the subject of a play by Professor Akinwunmi Isola.

Aniwura's statue is placed at the center of the Challenge roundabout, a major point within the modern city of Ibadan.

She has also been the subject of some Nigerian film productions including Efunsetan Aniwura.

== Iyalodes of Ibadan ==
- Iyalode Subuola, c.1851-1869
- Iyalode Efunsetan Aniwura, c.1870-1874
- Iyalode Iyaola, 1874-1893
- Iyalode Lanlatu Asabi Giwa, 1894-1913
- Iyalode Isale Osun, 1914-1917
- Iyalode Romlatu Ajisomo, 1917-1934
- Iyalode Rukayat Amosa Akande (alias Iyalode Ita Areegbeomo, 1935-1948
- Iyalode Abimbola, 1948-1961
- Iyalode Adebisi Abeo, 1961-1974
- Iyalode Wuraola Esan, 1975-1985
- Iyalode Hunmani Alade, 1985-1995
- Iyalode Wuraola Akintola, 1995-2007
- Iyalode Aminatu Abiodun, 2007-2018
- Iyalode Laduntan Oyekanmi, 2019 - date

== See also ==
- Efunroye Tinubu
- Gogo Habiba
