= Mainframe Films and Television Productions =

Nigerian film production company

- Company type: Private
- Industry: Entertainment
- Founded: 1991
- Headquarters: Lagos, Nigeria
- Key people: Tunde Kelani
- Products: Films
- Website: mainframemovies.tv

Mainframe Films and Television Productions (usually known as Mainframe Studios or Mainframe Films) was a film production company founded in 1991 by Nigerian cinematographer and film producer Tunde Kelani. Since its establishment in 1991, the production company had produced several notable Nigerian films.

== Productions ==
Year	Film
1993	Ti Oluwa Nile 1
1993	Ti Oluwa Nile 2
1993	Ti Oluwa Nile 3
1994	Ayo Ni Mofe
1994	Ayo Ni Mofe 2
1995	Koseegbe
1997	The White Handkerchief
1998	O Le Ku
1999	Saworoide
2000	White Handkerchief
2001	Thunderbolt: Magun
2002	Agogo Eewo
2004	The Campus Queen
2006	Abeni
2006	The Narrow Path
2008	Life in Slow Motion
2010	Arugba
2011	Maami
2014	Dazzling Mirage
