= Iwalewa =

2006 Nigerian film produced by Khabirat Kafidipe

- Directed by: Tunde Olaoye
- Written by: Khabirat Kafidipe; Aishat Kafidipe
- Produced by: Khabirat Kafidipe; Aishat Kafidipe
- Starring: Remi Abiola; Femi Branch; Khabirat Kafidipe
- Production company: Kaffy Movies
- Distributed by: Legend Pictures
- Release date: 2006
- Running time: 145 minutes
- Country: Nigeria
- Language: Yoruba

Iwalewa is a 2006 Nigerian film produced by Khabirat Kafidipe and her sister Aishat Kafidipe, directed by Tunde Olaoye and Writing by Aishat Kafidipe Khabirat . The film starred Remi Abiola and Femi Branch.

== Plot summary ==
The film narrates the story of a young girl, Iwalewa, who lost her parents at an early age, but had to live with the agony of being an orphan.

== Cast ==
- Khabirat Kafidipe as Iwalewa
- Femi Branch
- Remi Abiola

== Awards and nominations ==
The film got three nominations, but won two awards as Best Indigenous Film and Best Original Soundtrack at the 3rd Africa Movie Academy Awards held on 10 March 2007 at the Gloryland Cultural Center in Yenagoa, Bayelsa State, Nigeria. Khbirat Kafidipe's lead role in the film earned her the Africa Movie Academy Awards of Best Actress in a Leading Role.
