= Yemi Shodimu =

Nigerian actor, film director and filmmaker (born 1960)

- Born: 29 January 1960 (age 66); Ogun State, Nigeria
- Education: Obafemi Awolowo University; University of Lagos
- Occupations: Actor film director filmmaker
- Years active: 1976- till present
- Known for: Oleku (1997)

Yemi Shodimu (born 29 January 1960) is a Yoruba dramatist, television presenter, film director, and filmmaker.

== Early life ==
He was born in Abeokuta, the capital of Ogun State southwestern Nigeria. He spent his early life in Abeokuta at the palace of Alake of Egbaland where he was exposed to the Yoruba culture. He attended Obafemi Awolowo University where he obtained a Bachelor of Arts (B.A.) degree in dramatic art and later proceeded to the University of Lagos where he received a Master of Arts (M.A.) degree in Mass communication.

== Career ==
He began his acting career in 1976, the same year he featured in a movie titled Village Head Master. He was known for his lead role, Ajani in Oleku, a movie directed and produced by Tunde Kelani. In 2018, he was assigned as the producer of the satirical stage play franchise titled Isale Eko.

== Filmography ==
- Village Head Master (1976), featuring Victor Olaotan
- Ti Oluwa Ni Ile (1993)
- Ayo ni Mofe (1994)
- Koseegbe (1995)
- Oleku (1997) produced by Tunde Kelani
- Saworoide (1999) that featured Kunle Afolayan and Peter Fatomilola
- White Handkerchief (2000) as Odejimi
- Akobi gomina (2002) as C.S.O
- Erin Lakatabu (2004) as Eringbade
- Asoko peye (2008)
- 93 Days (2016) as Dr. Jide Idris
- Diamonds In The Sky (2019) as Brainmoh Soji
- The Miracle Centre (2020)
- The Bond (2021) as Akanmu
- Ijogbon (2023) as Principal
- Crossroads (2024) as Vice Chancellor

== See also ==
- List of Nigerian actors
