= Ogunmola =

Nigerian given name

- Gender: Male
- Language: Yoruba

Origin
- Origin: Nigeria
- Meaning: Ògún has gained wealth/notability.
- Region of origin: South West, Nigeria

Ogunmola audio is a Nigerian male given name and surname of Yoruba origin. It means "Ògún has gained wealth/notability".

== Notable individuals with the name ==
- Bolaji Ogunmola, Nigerian actress
- Peju Ogunmola, Yoruba actress.
- Kola Ogunmola (11 November 1925 – 1973) was a Nigerian dramatist, actor, mime, director, and playwright.
- Eyitayo Ogunmola (born 1988) is a Nigerian tech entrepreneur
- Adeola Ogunmola Showemimo, Nigerian pilot
