= Idowu Adebiyi Odugbesan =

Nigerian jurist

Hon. Justice Idowu Adebiyi Odugbesan

Judge of the Customary Court of Appeal, Ogun State
- Incumbent
- Assumed office 21 December 2021
- Appointed by: Dapo Abiodun

Personal details
- Born: August 5, 1965 (age 60) Oru-Ijebu, Ogun State, Nigeria
- Education: University of Lagos (LL.B)

Idowu Adebiyi Odugbesan (born 5 August 1965) is a Nigerian jurist and a Judge of the Customary Court of Appeal, Ogun State. He was sworn in on 21 December 2021 by Governor Dapo Abiodun.

== Early life and education ==
Idowu Adebiyi Odugbesan, born on August 5, 1965, hails from the Ijebu area of Ogun State.

He attended Sagun United Primary School, Oru Ijebu, for primary education before leaving for Obanta Comprehensive High School, Awa Ijebu, for his secondary education. He got his A-Levels from the Federal School of Arts and Science in Ondo State.

Odugbesan studied law at the University of Lagos, graduating with a Bachelor of Laws (LL.B) degree. He was called to the Nigerian Bar in 1991.

== Career ==
Odugbesan completed his mandatory National Youth Service Corps (NYSC) as a counsel at the chambers of G.O.H. Ariaga & Co. in Omoku, Rivers State. In 1992, he joined the law firm of Adebisi Dawodu & Co. in Ijebu Ode. He subsequently established his own private practice, Adebiyi Odugbesan & Co., in Ijebu Ode, serving as principal partner until his appointment to the bench. He has held several positions in the Ijebu Ode branch of the Nigerian Bar Association, including general secretary, vice chairman, and chairman.

In December 2021, the National Judicial Council recommended Odugbesan for appointment as a judge of the Customary Court of Appeal of Ogun State.

On 21 December 2021, he was sworn in as a judge of the Customary Court of Appeal, Ogun State, by Governor Dapo Abiodun.
