= Segun Adefila =

Nigerian performance artist and director

- Born: Lagos, Nigeria
- Education: University of Lagos; University of Ibadan
- Occupations: Performance artist, choreographer, cultural activist
- Known for: Co-founder and artistic director of Crown Troupe of Africa

Segun Adefila is a Nigerian performance artist, choreographer, dancer, actor, director, and cultural activist. He is the co-founder and artistic director of Crown Troupe of Africa, a pioneering total-theatre company based in Lagos, Nigeria, known for its innovative integration of dance, drama, music, and visual arts rooted in African indigenous performance traditions.

== Early life and education ==
Adefila was born and raised in Lagos but has deep roots in Omu Aran in Kwara State, North Central Nigeria. His first encounter with the arts began during his childhood in Omu Aran, where he danced with masquerades during traditional festivals. Coming from a royal family, he spent significant time in his paternal grandparents' palace, where masquerades would pay homage to the king during festivals before performing in the town.

Adefila received informal training in theatre with Black Image Theatre Company before pursuing formal education. He studied for a certificate in Drama from the defunct Centre for Cultural Studies, University of Lagos in 1997 and later obtained his Bachelor of Arts in Creative Arts from the same institution in 2002. He subsequently pursued graduate studies, joining the Master of Arts program in Performance Studies at the Institute of African Studies, University of Ibadan.

== Career ==
=== Crown Troupe of Africa ===
In June 1996, Adefila co-founded the Crown Troupe of Africa with a couple of friends. The company emerged as a response to Nigeria's socio-political challenges during the transition to the Fourth Republic. Based in Bariga, a working-class neighborhood on the Lagos mainland, Crown Troupe established itself as what scholars have described as "the theatre company of the Fourth Republic."

The troupe is distinguished by its "total-theatre" approach, combining multiple art forms into integrated performances. The group's creative approach blends dance, music, and dialogue, rooted in Africa's indigenous theatre traditions, drawing particularly from the Alárìnjó tradition of Yoruba theatre and masquerade aesthetics.

Crown Troupe's work is characterized by its commitment to social commentary and activism. The company uses performance art as a tool for social re-engineering, creating works that address corruption, economic inequality, environmental issues, and other contemporary challenges facing Nigerian society. Some notable productions include "Exodus," which explored economic austerity and brain drain, and "Aiyedun," a multimedia work documenting the impact of climate change on coastal communities in Lagos. Others include: "Dis Loyal Judas," an opera adaptation of the Biblical account of Judas Iscariot; and Love At War, an adaptation of a play by William Shakespeare and John Fletcher titled The Two Noble Kinsmen.

=== International recognition ===
Adefila began to gain recognition as a performer while in school, winning awards at both departmental and professional levels with Crown Troupe. The group's first international exposure came in 2002 when members were invited by the National Troupe of Nigeria to perform at the maiden edition of Contacting The World, an international youth theatre festival hosted by Manchester-based Contact Theatre.

=== Film career ===
Adefila has also worked in Nollywood, the Nigerian film industry. He is best known for his role in the film Arugba (2009), directed by acclaimed filmmaker Tunde Kelani. For his performance in Arugba, he was nominated in the Most Promising Actor category at the 2009 Africa Movie Academy Awards (AMAA). In the film, Adefila also composed and performed the song "Mi o Ni Choice," showcasing his versatility as a multidisciplinary artist. His other film credits include The Campus Queen (2004), The Narrow Path (2006) and Head Gone (2014).

=== Eko Theatre Carnival ===
Adefila is the founder and convener of the Eko Theatre Carnival, an annual week-long festival of drama, dance, music, and cultural performances held in Bariga. The 2021 edition marked the 25th anniversary of Crown Troupe of Africa. The carnival has become a significant cultural event in Lagos, featuring performances, seminars, fashion shows, film screenings, and traditional masquerade performances. The festival has hosted prominent Nigerian artists and intellectuals, including Professor Femi Osofisan, and has featured virtual lectures and international participants.

During the COVID-19 pandemic, Adefila adapted the festival to maintain cultural activities while observing safety protocols, creating what he termed a "REAL-TUAL" format that combined live performances with virtual participation.

=== Community Development Work ===
A significant aspect of Adefila's work is his commitment to youth development in the Bariga community. Since founding Crown Troupe, Adefila has focused on working with young people, helping them discover and develop their creative skills to advance careers in the performing arts. The troupe works with both students and street youth, providing training without requiring prior artistic experience. Many young people trained at Crown Troupe have gone on to establish their own performance groups or pursue professional careers in the arts.

The documentary film Bariga Boys (2009), directed by Femi Odugbemi, chronicles Adefila's life and work in the Bariga community, highlighting his use of guerrilla theatre, dance, and rap to engage with local youth and address social issues.

=== Directing and Other Work ===
Beyond his work with Crown Troupe, Adefila has directed productions for other theatre companies and commercial productions. He directed "Our Duke Has Gone Mad Again" for Duke of Shomolu Productions in 2020, and has adapted works by prominent Nigerian playwrights including Wole Soyinka's Alapata Apata and The Lion and the Jewel, as well as Joy Isi Bewaji's Eko Dialogue. Adefila also directed Kunle Afolayan's stage adaptation of Wole Soyinka's The Swamp Dwellers in 2024, and Cash Onadele's The Noble Warrior in 2025.

== Artistic Philosophy and Style ==
Adefila's work is rooted in a deep appreciation of African indigenous performance traditions, particularly the masquerade festivals of his Yoruba heritage. His performances often incorporate elements from these traditions while addressing contemporary social and political issues. He has been praised for maintaining cultural authenticity rather than imitating Western theatrical styles.

Scholars have noted that his work demonstrates "an intellectual radicalism" that facilitates creative engagements with works by other dramatists and mentors, including collaborations with renowned figures such as Wole Soyinka, the late Bode Osanyin, and filmmaker Tunde Kelani.

Known professionally as "Oriade" and referred to as the "Lead Masquerade" of Crown Troupe, Adefila embodies the spirit of African performance traditions while pushing the boundaries of contemporary theatre practice.

== Recognition and Legacy ==
Adefila has received numerous recognitions for his contributions to Nigerian theatre. He has been awarded by the Society of Nigerian Theatre Artists (SONTA) and has received accolades from academic and cultural institutions, including the Distinguished Personality Award of the Lagos Studies Association. A Chinese Master's student wrote her thesis on Adefila and his work, demonstrating the international scholarly interest in his contributions to African theatre.

In 2020, Adefila was part of For the Love of the Dance, a documentary centered on the Nigerian dance industry. The documentary featured other Nigerian dancers including Kaffy and Qudus Onikeku.

In 2021, Crown Troupe of Africa celebrated its 25th anniversary, marking a quarter-century of continuous operation—a remarkable achievement for an independent theatre company in Nigeria operating without consistent institutional funding.

== Personal life ==
Together with his family, Adefila lives and works in Lagos, maintaining his base at the Crown Art Factory in Bariga. Despite the challenges of operating a theatre company in Nigeria's difficult economic environment, he has remained committed to his community and his artistic vision. He has often spoken about initially pursuing science studies before discovering his true calling in the arts, a transition that faced skepticism and criticism but ultimately led to his success as a performance artist.
