= Moji Olaiya =

Nigerian actress (1975–2017)

- Born: 27 February 1975
- Died: 17 May 2017 (aged 42); Canada
- Occupation: Actress

Moji Olaiya (27 February 1975 – 17 May 2017) was a Nigerian actress.

== Career ==
The daughter of highlife musician Victor Olaiya, Moji Olaiya began her acting career with Wale Adenuga's production Super Story. She starred in several Nollywood movies of Yoruba and English genres. She was known for her roles in films such as No Pains No Gains, in which she played Ireti, Sade Blade (2005), Nkan adun (2008) and Omo iya meta leyi (2009). She also starred in the Agunbaniro. In 2003, she was nominated for the Reel Award Best Supporting Actress of the Year, and she won the Best New Actress Award.

In 2016, Olaiya released a film, Iya Okomi, starring Foluke Daramola and Funsho Adeolu, which was scheduled to premiere in Lagos in July.

== Personal life ==
Olaiya married Bayo Okesola in 2007, then separated. She converted to Islam in 2014.

Olaiya died on 17 May 2017, from cardiac arrest in Canada, where she had her second child exactly two months prior. She was finally laid to rest on 7 June 2017 according to Islamic rites.

== Selected filmography ==
- Aje nile Olokun
- Ojiji Aye
- Apaadi (2009)
- Omo Iya Meta leyi (2009)
- Akoto olokada (2009) as Shade
- Itakun ola (2008) as Bimbo
- Nkan adun (2008)
- Oro itan (2008)
- Sonibarin (2006)
- Ija Okan (2006)
- Eto ikoko (2005) as Deola
- Sade Blade (2005)
- Maradona (2003) as Nike

== See also ==
- List of Yoruba people
- List of Nigerian actors
