= Oleku =

Oleku may refer to:

- O Le Ku, a 1997 film directed by Tunde Kelani
- Oleku (song), a 2010 song by Ice Prince
