= Grace Oyin Adejobi =

Nigerian actress and theatre practitioner

Grace Oyin-Adejobi
- Born: Grace Owoola; Osogbo, Colony and Protectorate of Nigeria
- Other name: Iya Osogbo
- Occupations: Actress, theatre practitioner
- Known for: Yoruba travelling theatre; Kootu Asipa
- Spouse: Oyin Adejobi (m. 1953; died 2000)

Grace Owoola Oyin-Adejobi, popularly known as Iya Osogbo, is a Nigerian actress and theatre practitioner associated with the Yoruba travelling-theatre tradition. She began acting in Osogbo in 1953 with the theatre company led by her husband, dramatist Oyin Adejobi, and subsequently appeared in stage, television and film productions over several decades. In 2026, the Nigerian Tribune described her as one of the last surviving links to the era of Yoruba travelling theatre.

== Early life ==
Oyin-Adejobi was born in Osogbo, in present-day Osun State. In a 2016 interview with The Punch, she said that she was born in August 1931 to a contractor father and a trader mother. A 2026 Nigerian Tribune profile gives her date of birth as 23 August 1931. Other published accounts have given 23 August 1930, and birthday reports in 2020 and 2026 also used ages consistent with a 1930 birth year.

She attended All Saints School in Osogbo and left formal schooling after Standard Four. She subsequently trained in cloth design and tailoring and operated a tailoring shop before committing herself to theatre. She later recalled that her interest in acting had developed while she was at school, where she participated in drama and cultural activities.

== Career ==
=== Travelling theatre ===
Oyin-Adejobi began acting in 1953 after joining the theatre group led by Oyin Adejobi in Osogbo. She identified her first production with the company as Paradise Lost, staged at the Billiard Room in Osogbo in 1953. A later biographical profile states that she played Eve in the production.

The company toured towns and cities to stage plays, particularly during festive periods. Oyin-Adejobi recalled that most of the company's early work consisted of stage productions rather than films. Among productions in which she performed were Paradise Lost, Kuye and Orogun Adedigba. A 2022 profile by her biographer Vincent Akindele credited her with appearances in more than 300 stage plays, as well as a smaller number of films and home videos.

Oyin Adejobi's company was part of the Yoruba travelling-theatre movement that flourished in Nigeria during the mid-20th century. Oyin-Adejobi remained closely associated with the company as it expanded from live performance into television and film.

=== Television and film ===
Oyin-Adejobi became a familiar face on Yoruba-language television through productions associated with the Oyin Adejobi company. She appeared in Kootu Asipa (also rendered Kootu Ashipa; "Ashipa's Court"), a television series broadcast by the Nigerian Television Authority in Ibadan. Her other reported screen and stage productions include Orogun Adedigba, Kuye and Ipadabo Oduduwa.

She also appeared in Eran Iya Osogbo. In later interviews, she rejected the suggestion that the production was responsible for making her famous, saying that she was already well known from her years with the Oyin Adejobi Theatre Group before appearing in it.

Oyin-Adejobi continued to act after her husband's death in 2000, although she later reduced her acting work. By 2020, she said that age made travelling between locations difficult and that she no longer intended to return to regular acting.

== Stage name ==
Oyin-Adejobi is widely known by the stage name Iya Osogbo. She has said that the name developed during the period of her husband's television series Kootu Asipa. According to her account, members of the company had become uncomfortable with audiences addressing them by names of characters they had played, and Oyin Adejobi asked performers to choose consistent stage names. She chose "Lagbenjo Iya Osogbo"; fellow company members Kareem Adepoju and Alabi Yellow similarly adopted the names Baba Wande and Alabi Yellow.

== Personal life ==
She married actor, dramatist and theatre-company leader Oyin Adejobi in 1953. The couple had known each other in Osogbo before their marriage and had attended the same school and Anglican church, where Oyin Adejobi served as choir master. He died in 2000. Oyin-Adejobi continued appearing in productions after his death.

Their family became closely associated with the Oyin Adejobi theatre tradition. Their son Adediran Oyin-Adejobi later recalled growing up with both of his parents as actors and assisting with his father's film-production activities.

== Legacy ==
Oyin-Adejobi's career spans the transition from the Yoruba travelling-theatre era to broadcast television and the later Nigerian video-film industry. A 2026 profile in the Nigerian Tribune described her as one of the surviving links to the travelling companies that helped shape modern Nigerian popular theatre and screen entertainment.

A biography by Vincent Akindele, Iya Osogbo: Life and Times of Grace Owoola Oyin-Adejobi, was published by Hinds' Fit Communication Limited and reviewed in 2023.

== Selected works ==
- Paradise Lost
- Kuye
- Orogun Adedigba
- Kootu Asipa
- Ipadabo Oduduwa
- Eran Iya Osogbo
