= Malaika (film) =

2023 Nigerian film

- Directed by: Steve Olufemi Sodiya
- Produced by: Toyin Abraham Executive Producers =Toyin Abraham                      = Adebola Williams                        = Seun Oluyemi = Fountain Rentals
- Starring: Toyin Abraham; Emeka Ike; Uzor Arukwe; Odunlade Adekola
- Release date: 22 December 2023
- Country: Nigeria

Malaika is a 2023 Nigerian supernatural drama film produced by Toyin Abraham and directed by Steve Olufemi Sodiya. It stars Toyin Abraham, Emeka Ike, Odunlade Adekola, Ibrahim Chatta, Taiwo Ajai-Lycett, Uzor Arukwe, and Carter Efe and others. The film was released in cinemas across Nigeria on 22 December 2023, grossing ₦300 million to become Abraham's highest-grossing film.

== Synopsis ==
Dr. Njoku and his wife, Mrs. Njoku, are successful in their respective careers but struggle with infertility, which leads to conflict within the family. Dr. Njoku's stepdaughter also contributes to the feud through her strained relationship with Mrs. Njoku. Despite his efforts, Dr. Njoku is unable to resolve the disagreements between his wife and stepdaughter. Frustrated by infertility and childlessness, Mrs. Njoku turns to an Ifa priest, a decision that brings about a transformation in her life and in the family as a whole.

== Selected cast ==
- Toyin Abraham as Mrs. Njoku
- Emeka Ike as Dr. Njoku
- Muyiwa Ademola
- Taiwo Ajai-Lycett
- Samuel Ajirebi as security man
- Uzor Arukwe
- Westy Baba
- Ibrahim Chatta
- Carter Efe
- Dele Odule
- Peju Ogunmola
- Chinyere Wilfred
- Remi Surutu
- Sisi Quadri
- Rubby Orjiakor
- Ogunmade Olubummy
- Oluwapelu Olawumi
- Anne Kansiime

== Production and release ==
Following its release to the Nigerian cinema on 22 December 2023, Malaika sparked various conversations, including the return of Emeka Ike to the big screen. Ike, who starred as Dr. Njoku in the film, described it as a therapy for broken homes. Malaika was released in cinemas in the United Kingdom on 5 January 2024.
