= The Virgin (novel) =

1985 novel by Bayo Adebowale

- Author: Bayo Adebowale
- Language: English
- Series: Egret Romance & Thrillers
- Genre: Literary fiction
- Publisher: Bounty Press and Paperback Publishers, Ibadan
- Publication date: 1985
- Publication place: Nigeria
- Media type: Print (hardback & paperback)
- Pages: 116 pp
- ISBN: 978-33029-1-4
- OCLC: 633633330

The Virgin is the 1985 debut novel by Nigerian writer Bayo Adebowale. The novel, published in 1985, narrated the dilemma of a young village girl who after being deflowered must choose between three suitors, and agonizes about her secret being discovered on her wedding night. Scholar Wendy Griswold classifies The Virgin as a "village novel", a book that deals with the mores of a traditional Nigerian village, in the same vein as some works by Chinua Achebe.

== Plot ==
A girl from a Yoruba village is engaged to a hunter from another village. Having been seduced by a man returning to the village from his life in a Nigerian city, she nervously awaits her wedding night.

== Background ==
Adebowale is considered a member of the "third generation" of Nigerian authors, whose works generally deal with more cosmopolitan themes than earlier generations of Nigerian writers. However, unlike other members of the "third generation", Adebowale's work deals with rural life in Nigeria, particularly life in small villages. The Virgin is an example of one such work; Adebowale believes that Nigerian writers and artists have a duty to examine and reflect on traditional Nigerian life.

== Film adaptation ==
Tunde Kelani wrote the screenplay and directed a 95-minute film version, titled The Narrow Path, filmed and released on 12 May 2006. The film starred Sola Asedeko, Ayo Badmus and Khabirat Kafidipe while the sound track was written and produced by Beautiful Nubia. The film was edited by Mumin Wale Kelani and Frank Efe Patrick and the costume was designed by Abiola Atanda Much of the dialogue and narration is taken directly from the novel. The film is considered faithful to the book in spite of the latter's non-traditional narrative.
