= Akinloye Ojo =

Akinloye Ojo is a professor and the director of the African studies Institute at the University of Georgia, where he also teaches at the Department Comparative Literature and Intercultural Studies. He was the executive editor for the African Language Teachers’ Association (ALTA) between 2004 and 2008. He has also served as the Vice President of the American Association of Yoruba Teachers (AATY). He received the PEN America Translation Fund Grant in the year 2010 for translating the poetry of the late Akinwumi Isola to English language. He is an advocate of the development of African languages as well as the development of the African society and culture, including African and economic advancement in the 21st century. He teaches courses in African studies including courses such as Yorùbá language and culture. His publications cut across African language teaching and programming, Yoruba language acquisition, Yoruba onomastics, as well as the African language, culture and society.

== Education ==
Ojo obtained a Bachelor of Arts in African linguistics at the University of Ibadan, Nigeria in 1991, after which he received a Master of Arts in general linguistics from Cornell University in 1996. In 1999, he obtained a graduate certificate in women's studies from the University of Georgia, where he later obtained the title of Doctor of Philosophy, in 2001 with a specialization also in linguistics.

== Publications ==
=== Books ===
- Òjó, Akinloyè (2022). Language, Society, and Empowerment in Africa and Its Diaspora. Rowman & Littlefield. ISBN 978-1-7936-4472-5.
- Òjó, Akinloyè (2026). Language, Translation, and Poetic Realities: The Poetry (Àfàìmò ...) of Akínwùmí Ìsòlá. Bloomsbury Academic. ISBN 978-1-5013-9063-0.

=== Edited books ===
- Moshi, Lioba J.; Ojó, Akinloyè (2009). Language Pedagogy and Language Use in Africa. Adonis & Abbey. ISBN 978-1-906704-60-5.
- Aderibigbe, Ibigbolade Simon; Ojo, Akinloye (2012). Continental Complexities: A Multidisciplinary Introduction to Africa. Cognella, Incorporated. ISBN 978-1-62131-133-1.
- Ojo, Akinloye; Sotunsa, Mobolanle; Traore, Karim (2016). Expressions of Indigenous and Local Knowledge in Africa and its Diaspora. Cambridge Scholars Publishing. ISBN 978-1-4438-9645-0.
- Ojo, Akinloye; Traore, Karim; Longe, Oyinlola (2017). Africans and Globalization: Linguistic, Literary, and Technological Contents and Discontents. Lexington Books. ISBN 978-1-4985-3431-4.
- Òjó, Akinloyè; Aderibigbe, Ibigbolade S.; Kiprono, Felisters Jepchirchir (2018). Gender and Development in Africa and Its Diaspora. Routledge. ISBN 978-1-351-11988-7.
- Chepyator-Thomson, Jepkorir-Rose; Ojo, Akinloye; Traore, Karim; Sonkeng, Katja (2020). Youth, Globalization, and Society in Africa and Its Diaspora. Cambridge Scholars Publishing. ISBN 978-1-5275-4685-1.
