= Ti Oluwa Ni Ile =

1993 film by Tunde Kelani

- Directed by: Tunde Kelani
- Story by: Kareem Adepoju
- Starring: Kareem Adepoju; Dele Odule; Grace - Oyin Adejobi; Jide Oyegunle; Yemi Shodimu; Lekan Oladapo; Yetunde Ogunsola; Gbolagbade Akinpelu; Akin Sofoluwe
- Cinematography: Tunde Kelani
- Production company: Mainframe Films and Television Productions
- Release date: 1993 (Nigeria)
- Running time: 93min
- Country: Nigeria
- Language: Yoruba

Ti Oluwa Ni Ile (English: The Land is the Lord's) is a Nollywood Yoruba drama film sequel directed by Tunde Kelani. Released in 1993 through Mainframe Films and Television Productions, the film was Tunde Kelani's debut film as a film director. It was made in 3 parts and listed as one of the 10 best selling Yoruba movies.

== Plot ==
Two greedy men engage the services of a corrupt chief to sell a piece of an ancestral land for kickbacks. The new landowners are a petroleum company. The oracle; the mouthpiece of the gods, however, reveal that the land belongs to the deities of the land and therefore is not fit for a petrol station. The land sellers die suddenly, and the chief realises he is next. He goes to the oracle for help. The oracle tells him that he will survive if he can prevent the body of the second co-conspirator from being buried. The story follows his futile attempts to prevent the eventual burial. The oracle gives him a second chance, but he runs away and is faced by a series of unfortunate events. He eventually makes his way home and finds that he has been presumed dead. He attempts to reclaim his traditional title, but the spirits of his co-conspirators come for his life.

== Cast ==
- Kareem Adepoju as Baba Wande
- Dele Odule
- Lekan Oladapo
- Yemi Shodimu
- Yetunde Ogunsola
- Oyin Adejobi
- Gbolagbade Akinpelu
- Jide Oyegunle
- Akin Sofoluwe
