= Rise of the Saints =

2020 Nigerian action fantasy film

- Directed by: Samuel O. Olateru
- Written by: Tamara Aihie
- Produced by: Bolanle Olasunde
- Starring: Deyemi Okanlawon; Rachel Oniga; Tina Mba; Peter Fatomilola
- Release date: 9 October 2020; (Nigeria)
- Running time: 100 minutes
- Country: Nigeria
- Language: English

Rise of the Saints is a 2020 Nigerian action fantasy film directed by Samuel O. Olateru and produced by Bolanle Olasunde. The film, which tells the story of the Yoruba legend Queen Moremi Ajasoro, stars Deyemi Okanlawon and Rachel Oniga in the lead roles, while Tina Mba, Peter Fatomilola, and Teleola Kuponiyi play supporting roles.

The film premiered on 9 October 2020 at Filmhouse IMAX Cinemas in Lekki, after five years in production, receiving mixed reviews from critics.

== Cast ==
- Teleola Kuponiyi as Luke
- Deyemi Okanlawon as Wale
- Rachel Oniga as Aunty Tolu
- Tina Mba as Prophetess
- Peter Fatomilola as Orula
- Disu Aderonke Funmilayo as Dena
- Daniel Ugbang
