= Koseegbe =

- Directed by: Tunde Kelani
- Written by: Akinwunmi Isola
- Screenplay by: Akinwunmi Isola
- Based on: A play by Akinwunmi Isola
- Produced by: Tunde Kelani
- Starring: Kola Oyewo; Wole Ameleo; Jide Kosokoo; Toyin A Babatope
- Edited by: Idowu Nubi
- Production company: Mainframe Films and Television Productions
- Distributed by: Alasco Video Film Production; Blessed J.O. Adeoye; Alelele Bros. & Co
- Release date: 1995
- Running time: 102 minutes
- Country: Nigeria
- Language: Yoruba Language

Kòseégbé (English: Immovable) is a 1995 Yoruba drama film directed by Tunde Kelani based on a stage play of the same name by Akinwunmi Isola. The cast consisted of actors from the Obafemi Awolowo University theatre. It was released through Mainframe Films and Television Productions.

== Plot ==
Koseegbe tells the story of a morally upright customs officer who replaces a senior official who was dismissed on account of corruption. At his new post, he attempts to sanitize the system as he gets pushed back from the equally corrupt junior officers. In order to orchestrate his dismissal, the junior officers frame him for illicit behaviour. He is however able to secure their confession and absolve himself.

== Cast ==
- Kola Oyewo as Mako
- Wole Amele as Maliki
- Jide Kosoko as Arowolo
- Toyin A Babatope as Suwebatu
- Yetunde Ogunsola as Dola
- Joke Muyiwa as Mako's Wife
- Yemi Sodimu as Salu
- Laide Adewale as Gbelegbo
- Gboyega Ajayi as Tola
- Jimoh Fakoyejo as Mamu
- Faith Eboigbe as Salu's Wife
- Taiye Adegboyega as Gbelegbo's Wife
- Feso Oyewole as Talabi
- Peter Fatomilola as Police Chief
- Deola Yusuff-Badmus as Iyawo Tola
- Olokun Samson as Tanko
- Tayo Oyewusi as Dandogo
- Feso Oyewole as Talabi

== Production ==
Koseegbe was Tunde Kelani's third film and his first work with Akinwunmi Isola. It started out as a stage play of the same name by Isola who was unable to write the script for film, so Kelani gave him the script for Driving Miss Daisy to use as a sample. It was released on VHS in 1995.

It was listed as one of the 10 best selling Yoruba movies.
