= Arugba =

2008 film by Tunde Kelani

- arugba movie poster
- Directed by: Tunde Kelani
- Written by: yemi Peter Badejo Segun Adefila Kareem Adepoju Lere Paimo
- Screenplay by: Ade Adeniji
- Produced by: Mainframe Productions
- Starring: Remi Abiola; Segun Adefila; Jare Adeniregun; Folake Adeparusi; Kareem Adepoju; Adejumoke Aderounmu Mobandele; Tunde Adeyemo as Atanda; Prince Leke Ajao Jayinfa (as Prince Adeleke Ajao); Akambi Akala; Bukola Awoyemi; Peter Badejo; Foluke Daramola; Dotun Emmanuel; Idowu Fabunmi; Abeni Fashola; Seyi Fasuyi; Funke Fayoyin
- Cinematography: Lukman AbdulRahman
- Edited by: Frank Anore Hakeem Olowookere
- Music by: Wole Oni Adunni & Nefretiti Segun Adefila
- Release date: 2008
- Running time: 95 minutes
- Country: Nigeria
- Language: Yoruba
- Budget: ₦22 million

Arugba is a 2008 film.

== Synopsis ==
Adetutu faces many responsibilities. She must juggle her role as Arugba (the virgin) in the annual community festival with her studies at the university. She must also care for an ailing and grieving friend. Other plot points include Adejare, a demanding king, Adetutu's blossoming musical career, and her growing fondness for a gifted artist named Makinwa which places a strain on Adetutu's relationship with the other members of her all female musical group.

== Cast Member ==
Remi Abiola as Tunrayo

Segun Adefila as Makinwa

Jare Adeniregun as Lecturer

Folake Adeparusi as Iya Adetutu

Kareem Adepoju as Aigoro

Adejumoke Aderounmu Mobandele (as Jumoke Aderounmu)

Tunde Adeyemo as Atanda

Prince Leke Ajao Jayinfa (as Prince Adeleke Ajao)

Akambi Akala as Dr. Adigun

Bukola Awoyemi as Adetutu

Peter Badejo as Adejare

Foluke Daramola as Tinuoye

Dotun Emmanuel as Iya Ewe

Idowu Fabunmi as Ayinla

Abeni Fashola as Mama

Seyi Fasuyi as Aworo Osun

Funke Fayoyin as Itiola

Sanya Gold Aare Abinukogi (as Prince Sanya Gold)

Oyadina Hakeem as Odewale

Ademola Alabi Joshua as Student(as Joshua Alabi Ademola)

Aishat Kafidipe as Bolatito

Khabirat Kafidipe Morenike(as Kabirat Kafidipe)

Oriade Morenike as Yejide

Dele Odule as Aare Onikoyi

Gbenga Oladunni as Baale

Razak Oyadiran as Dr. Sunmonu

Tella Oyeyemi as Okiki

Lere Paimo as Baba Kekere

Togunbo Shogbamu as Akin

Bukky Wright as Adesewa

And the director of the Movie is Tunde Kelani.

== Prizes ==
- Africa Movie Academy Awards 2009
