= Agogo Eewo =

- Directed by: Tunde Kelani
- Screenplay by: Akinwunmi Isola
- Produced by: Tunde Kelani
- Starring: Dejumo Lewis; Deola Faleye; Lere Paimo; Larinde Akinleye
- Cinematography: Tunde Kelani
- Edited by: Mumin Wale Kelani
- Music by: Biodun Oni
- Production company: Mainframe Films and Television Productions
- Release date: 2002
- Running time: 106 minutes
- Country: Nigeria
- Language: Yoruba-language

Agogo Eewo (English: Taboo Gong) is a 2002 Yoruba-language film and sequel to the 1999 film Saworoide. It was written by Akunwunmi Isola, and produced and directed by Tunde Kelani. It stars Dejumo Lewis, Deola Faleye, Lere Paimo and Larinde Akinleye.

== Plot ==
Following the death of Lapite and Lagata, the Jogbo chiefs attempt to put an Onijogbo (king) of their choosing on the throne in order to be able to continue their corrupt practices. They pick a retired police officer named Adebosipo whom they thought will be in their favour. On ascending the throne, Adebosipo turns a new leaf and decides to move on from corrupt ways and advocates for peace and progress in the community. He admonishes his chiefs to depart from their old ways. Balogun, Seriki, Bada and Iyalaje continue their corrupt practices. The town youth kicked against the presence of corrupt chiefs on Adebosipo's cabinet and call for their removal. The king sets up a committee to audit the activities of the chiefs. Those found guilty were compelled to return the funds looted by them. The king summons the Ifa priest Amawomárò, who recommends the reinstatement of an oath-taking ritual to ensure the moral upstanding of the chiefs. A public oath-taking ceremony is organised and where the chiefs were to confess their past misdeeds before swearing the oath. Two chiefs, Balogun and Seriki, refused and died on the spot when the agogo eewo (taboo gong) was struck seven times.

== Cast ==
- Dejumo Lewis as Adebosipo
- Kunle Afolayan as Arese
- Khabirat Kafidipe as Arapa
- Deola Faleye as Lape
- Lere Paimo as Balogun
- Larinde Akinleye as Serike
- Awosike Ife Abosede as Alake
- Gbenga Adebayo as Niyi
- Aderemi Adedeji as Abenugan
- Tunde Adegbola as Onkawe
- Motunrayo Adeoye as Iyalode
- Laide Adewale as Otun
- Sunday Afolabi as Sewonro
- Bukky Wright as Tinuola
- Biodun Duroladipo as Iyun
- Abiola Atanda as Iyalaje
- Bimbo Akinsaya as Moji

== Production and release ==
It was listed as one of the 10 best-selling Yoruba movies. It was classified as Not to Be Broadcast (NTBB) by the Nigerian Film and Video Censors Board (NFVCB) citing the demonstration of occult practices, violence and seduction.

It was reviewed at the African Film Festival in New York in April 2004.

== Themes ==
Like Saworoide, Agogo Eewo explores the themes of politics and corruption and juxtaposes Nigeria as the fictional town of Jogbo. It also introduces the viewer to Yoruba culture and fashion as some scenes delicately explain types of gele.
