= Cornelius Taiwo =

Nigerian academic and lawyer

Omoba Cornelius Olaleye Taiwo
- Born: 27 October 1910; Oru-Ijebu Ogun State, Nigeria
- Died: 8 April 2014 (aged 103); Ikeja, Lagos, Nigeria
- Education: University of Cambridge; University of London
- Occupations: Educator, lawyer, author

Cornelius Olaleye Taiwo (27 October 1910 – 8 April 2014) was a Nigerian educator and lawyer.

== Early life and education ==
Taiwo was born on 27 October 1910, at Oru-Ijebu in Ogun State, Nigeria, to Isaac and Lydia Taiwo. He started school shortly after World War I and attended St. Luke's School, a CMS school of St. Luke's Church. Oru, Ijebu in 1921. He proceeded to St Andrews College, Oyo, and later attended Yaba Higher College, Lagos. He attended the University of London and earned a D. Litt degree in 1982. He also earned an M.A Degree in Mathematics from Trinity College, Cambridge University, a Barrister-at-Law degree of the Middle Temple Inn's Court and Hon. LL.D. (Cape Coast).

== Academic career ==
Taiwo commenced his teaching career as the headmaster of Sagun United School, Oru-Ijebu, a government-assisted institution in 1932. He was the first African Principal of Edo College, Benin City and became Permanent Secretary, Ministry of Agriculture & Natural Resources in the former Regional government of Western Nigeria; He was called to the Bar at the Middle Temple (Inn of Court), London on 4 February 1964, and enrolled as Barrister-at-Law and Solicitor of the Supreme Court of Nigeria on 3 July 1964.

Taiwo worked with the Western Nigerian Government between 1960 and 1966 when he served variously as Administrative Officer, Inspector of Education and ultimately as Permanent Secretary, to the University of Lagos where he spent 11 years, private legal practice and authorship of books. He became the first Emeritus Professor of Education and Provost of the University of Lagos. He was also appointed as Pro Chancellor and Chairman of the Governing Council of the University of Ilorin on 1 September 1990 and became a Solicitor and Advocate of the Supreme Court of Nigeria. He taught in many other universities including University of Lagos before retiring from active service.

== Personal life ==
Taiwo was a prince who hailed from the Olumota ruling house of the Oba Oloru of Oru, Ijebu, thus making him an Omoba of the Yoruba people. He married Susan Olufowoke Keleko on 25 December 1941, at St. James Church, Ibadan. They had six children. He died at the age of 103 in 2014.

== Honours ==
- Baba Ijo (Father of the congregation), a chieftaincy title, of St. Luke's Church, Oru, Ijebu since 1973.
- Fellow of Commonwealth Council for Educational Administration
- Fellow of Nigerian Academy of Education
- Lord LUPEN; NAPE's highest award (the Lord of all Luminaries of Professional Educators of Nigeria, 1989)
- Inducted into the International Educators' Hall of Fame

== Selected publications ==
He wrote several books, papers and articles. Noted ones include:

- Taiwo, Cornelius O. (1976). The Mother Tongue as a Means of Promoting Equal Access to Education in Nigeria: Problems and Solutions. United Nations Educational, Scientific and Cultural Organization.
- Taiwo, Cornelius O. (1980). 70 years in The Nigerian Educational System:past, present and future. Nelson Nigeria. ISBN 978-1260-726.
- Taiwo, Cornelius O. (1975). Henry Carr: An African Contribution to Education. Oxford University Press. ISBN 978-0-19575-282-3.
- Taiwo Cornelius O. "The Education Edicts of Nigeria". Kenyatta University Library. 18 (2). West African Journal of Education: 183–187.
- Taiwo Cornelius O. (1976). Nigeria Language Problems and Solution.
- Taiwo Cornelius O. The Administration and Control of Education in Nigeria.
- Taiwo Cornelius O. Traditional Methods of Education in Africa.
- Taiwo Cornelius O. The Rule of Law in Education.
- Taiwo, Cornelius O. (1996). Learning thrills: memoirs of an educationist. Y-Books. ISBN 9782659916.
