= Mainframe Film and Media Institute =

Nigerian film school

Mainframe Film and Media Institute is a film academy situated in Abeokuta, Ogun State, Nigeria. It was founded by Tunde Kelani in 2016.

== Background ==
The institute has a Film School Basic (FSB) program where students learn the basics of filmmaking and media applications.
