= Lonely Days (novel) =

2006 novel by Bayo Adebowale

- Author: Bayo Adebowale
- Language: English
- Publication date: January 1, 2006
- Publication place: Nigeria
- Pages: 141

Lonely Days is a 2006 novel written by a Nigerian writer Bayo Adebowale. Set in the southwestern part of Nigeria, the novel centers on the plight of widowhood experienced by Nigerian women. The central character, Yaremi, becomes a widow after the sudden death of her husband, Ajumobi, who was a powerful hunter.

== Characters ==
- Yaremi: The major character in the book, wife of Ajumobi and mother to Alani, and his two sisters
- Ajumobi: Husband to Yaremi, a powerful hunter who died suddenly
- Woye: Grand child of Yaremi
- Radeke, Dedewe and Fayoyin: widows and friends to Yaremi

== Themes ==
Lonely Days explores the themes of loneliness, widowhood, tradition and customs, and women's inheritance in Nigeria.
