= O Le Ku =

1997 Yoruba romantic drama film

- Directed by: Tunde Kelani
- Story by: Akinwunmi Ishola
- Based on: O Le Ku (novel)
- Produced by: Tunde Kelani
- Starring: Yemi Shodimu
- Production company: Mainframe Films and Television Productions
- Release date: 1997
- Running time: 204 minutes
- Country: Nigeria
- Language: Yoruba

O Le Ku is a 1997 Nigerian romantic drama film produced and directed by Tunde Kelani. It is an adaptation of Prof. Akinwunmi Ishola's novel of the same name. It was released in 1997 by Mainframe Film and Television Productions. It was made in two parts.

== Plot ==
O Le Ku tells the story of Ajani, an undergraduate of the University of Ibadan who is in his final year. He is under pressure from his mother to find a partner and he unwittingly finds himself in a love quadrangle. He dates three women simultaneously; Asake, a secondary school teacher is his long-term girlfriend. He meets Lola, a fresher who is tall, slim and pretty. The situation gets complicated when he meets a childhood acquaintance who eventually takes centre stage of the love drama. Asake's father badgers her to sever her relationship with Ajani but she however falls pregnant, and Lola finds out and Ajani has to choose a wife under duress from his mother.

== Cast ==
- Yemi Shodimu as Ajani
- Feyikemi Abodunrin as Asake
- Pauline Dike as Lola
- Omolola Amusan as Sade
- Lere Paimo as Adeleke, Asake's dad
- Kola Oyewo as Oloye Ajasa
- Hafiz Oyetoro
- Toun Oni
- Gboyega Olomodosi
- Tunde Adegbola as Officer
- Dupe Taylor as Officer's Girlfriend
- Lanre Hassan as Awero
- Lai Karounwi as Soldier
- Deji Adenuga
- Laide Adewale as Prof 1
- Larinde Akinleye
- Akinwunmi Ishola as Prof 2
- Tunde Awosanmi
- Cecilia Kechere as Femi

== Production ==
Significant parts of the film were filmed on location at the University of Ibadan.

== Reception ==
O Le Ku was said to have sparked the short aso oke Iro and Buba fashion trend also called Oleku.

It was listed as one of the ten iconic Nollywood stories from the 90s.

Akin Adesokan in his 2011 book described the film as "the best example of Yoruba language film in Nollywood regarding how the actors and actresses articulate their point of views in “undiluted” Yoruba language."

It has been adopted to teach foreign Yoruba Language learners in institutions in the United States and Europe due to the standard of Yoruba Language spoken in the movie.

== See also ==
- Saworoide
- List of Nigerian films of 1997
