= Kola Oyewo =

Nigerian actor (1946–2026)

- Born: 27 March 1946; Colony and Protectorate of Nigeria
- Died: 12 June 2026 (aged 80)
- Citizenship: Nigeria
- Education: Obafemi Awolowo University
- Occupations: Actor; dramatist; scholar
- Years active: 1964–2026
- Known for: The Gods Are Not to Blame, Sango (1997), Saworoide

Kola Oyewo (27 March 1946 – 12 June 2026) was a Nigerian actor, dramatist and scholar.

== Early life and education ==
Oyewo was born on 27 March 1946 at Oba Ile, a town in Osun State, South West, Nigeria.

He attended Obafemi Awolowo University where he obtained a certificate in dramatic arts, and a certificate in Yoruba oral literature before he later received a Bachelor of Arts (B.A.) degree in Theatre art from the same university in 1995. He proceeded to the University of Ibadan where he earned a Master of Arts (M.A.) and doctorate degree (Ph.D.) in drama.

== Career ==
Oyewo began acting as a professional in 1964 after he joined the "Oyin Adejobi theatre group" and the first role he played was Adejare in Orogun Adedigba, which was Oyin Adejobi's autobiography. After he spent nine years with Oyin Adejobi, he joined the University of Ife theatre, where he worked with the late veteran dramatist and scholar, chief Ola Rotimi. Oyewo was known for the role he played as "Odewale" in The Gods Are Not to Blame, a drama by Ola Rotimi.

In 1996, Oyewo joined the services of Obafemi Awolowo University, where he rose to the rank of senior lecturer before retiring in September 2011. After his retirement from Obafemi Awolowo University, he joined the services of Redeemer's University, where he served as head of the department of dramatic art. He later worked at Elizade University Ilara-Mokin, Ondo State as a performing arts lecturer.

== Death ==
Oyewo died on 12 June 2026, at the age of 80.Announcing his death on Instagram actor Kunle Afod said, “Tonight, we lost a true legend. Kola Oyewo has taken his final bow. His remarkable talent, timeless performances, and immense contributions to the Nigerian theatre and film industry will never be forgotten.”

Reacting on his demise, His Royal majesty, Ọba Adéyẹyè Ògúnwùsì spoke warmly about Kọ̀la Oyewo, praising him for his great contributions to drama and culture, and describing him as one of Yorubaland’s legends.

The former vice president of Nigeria, Atiku Abubakar expressed sadness over the death of veteran Yoruba actor and respected scholar of African drama, Kola Oyewo. He described him as a legendary figure in the theatre world whose dedication to acting, teaching, and storytelling made a lasting impact on Nigerian culture. In a tribute shared on his verified Facebook page on Saturday, Atiku praised the late actor for his outstanding contributions to the growth of theatre and the preservation of African storytelling traditions. His message came a day after news of Dr. Oyewo’s death at the age of 80 was announced.

== Cause of death ==
Before his death, Kola Oyewo had spoken openly about his struggle with prostate enlargement and prostate cancer. He used his experience to create awareness and encourage men to go for early medical check-ups.

According to a statement released by his family and signed by Adewale Oyewo, the veteran actor passed away after a brief illness.

== Filmography ==
- Sango (1997)
- Super Story (episode 1)
- The Gods Are Not to Blame as Odewale
- Saworoide (1999) as King Lapite
- Koseegbe (1995) as Mako
- O Le Ku (1997) as Oloye Ajasa
- Efunsetan Aniwura (2005)
- Yemoja (2011) as Osi
- Omo University (2015) as Vice Chancellor
- Ayomi (2015) as Chief Olalere
- Ewon Laafin (2015) as Oludeti
- Ofeefe - Mirage (2019) as Baba Morenikeji
- Oba Bi Olorun (2021) as Balogun
- Oosa Aafin (2022) as Oluawo
- Olukoti (2022)
- Ogeere (2023)
