= Tamara Aihie =

Nigerian screen writer

- Born: July 11; Islington, London, United Kingdom
- Occupations: screenwriter; Host
- Years active: 2012 - present
- Notable work: Blood Sisters; Rise of the Saints
- Parent: Isioma Aihie

Tamara Aihie is a Nigerian host, and screenwriter, best known for writing Rise of the Saints. She is also one of the writers of the Nigerian thriller seriesBlood Sisters.

== Filmography ==
- Blood Sisters (2022)
- Rise of the Saints (2020)
- The Yellow Wall (2019 - 2020)
- On The Real (2016)
- Shade Corner
- Inspector K(2018)
- Money.Men.Marriage (2017)
