= The Campus Queen =

2004 Nollywood musical directed by Tunde Kelani

- Directed by: Tunde Kelani
- Written by: Akinwunmi Isola
- Screenplay by: Akinwunmi Isola
- Starring: Jide Kosoko; Lere Paimo; Sound Sultan; Khabirat Kafidipe; Afeez Oyetoro; Akinwunmi Isola
- Cinematography: Tunde Kelani
- Music by: Sound Sultan
- Production company: Mainframe Films and Television Productions
- Distributed by: Rolex Nigeria Limited
- Release date: April 2004 (Nigeria)
- Running time: 100min
- Country: Nigeria
- Languages: Yoruba and English

The Campus Queen is a 2004 Nollywood musical that was directed by Tunde Kelani with production from Mainframe Films and Television Productions. The film premiered at the 2004 edition of the African Film Festival in New York City, U.S.A. It was also the official film selection at the Black Film Festival in Cameroon.

== Background ==
The Campus Queen is a film accompanied by much music, dance and activism, thus depicting the lifestyle of students in university campuses. It also highlights the urge for power and supremacy by student clubs.

== Cast ==
- Jide Kosoko as Obente
- Lere Paimo as Chief Bongo
- Segun Adefila as Toks
- Toyin Adegbol as Toks' Mother
- Sound Sultan
- Khabirat Kafidipe as Tolu
- Tope Idowu as Governor
- Afeez Oyetoro as Kendy (Cook)
- Serah Mbaka as Banke
- Akinwunmi Isola as Professor
- Segun Odegbami as Dean
- Doyin Hassan as Goroso
- Tunde Lawal as Ike
- Abiola Atanda
