= Bayo Adebowale =

Nigerian novelist, critic, and librarian

- Born: 6 June 1944 (age 82); Adeyipo village, Ibadan, Oyo State, Nigeria
- Education: University of Ilorin
- Occupations: poet; novelist; critics; author
- Years active: 1961 - present
- Known for: The Virgin; Lonely Days

Bayo Adebowale (born 6 June 1944) is a Nigerian novelist, poet, professor, critic, librarian and founder of the African Heritage Library and Cultural Centre, Adeyipo, Ibadan Oyo State

== Early life and education ==
He was born on 6 June 1944 in Ibadan, the capital of Oyo State, Southwestern Nigeria into the family of Akangbe Adebowale, who was a farmer.

Bayo obtained his West African School Certificate from Secondary Modern School Ibadan in 1958 after which he proceeded to St Peter's Teacher College where he received a Grade III certificate in education in 1961. He was admitted to Baptist College in Ede where he obtained a Grade II Teacher certificate.

He later on proceeded to the University of Ibadan, where he obtained a Bachelor of Arts (B.A) degree in English Language in 1974 and served the National Youth Service Corps in 1975. The same year he joined the services of the Western State Public Service Commission as an education officer before he later became an English instructor at Government Trade Centre, Oyo State. Three years later (1978), He obtained a master's degree in the English language. The same year he joined the Oyo State College of Education as Lecturer I and was later transferred to the Polytechnic of Ibadan, where he rose to the position of Deputy Rector between 1999 and 2003 having obtained a Doctorate Degree (Ph.d) in Literature in English from the University of Ilorin in 1997.

== Books ==
He has published hundreds of books, short stories and novels as a prolific writer. His debut novel, The Virgin, was adapted into two Nigerian films: The Narrow Path, a 2006 Nigerian film produced and directed by Tunde Kelani, which starred Sola Asedeko, and The White Handkerchief. He authored Lonely Days, a book that focus on African culture.

He has played a significant role in Black African Literature in English. He also authored a novel titled Out of his Mind. In 1972, his short story, titled The River Goddess bagged the Western State Festival of Arts Literary Competition and In 1992, his poem, titled Perdition bagged the Africa Prize in the Index on Censorship International Poetry Competition in London. His work have been used in research and teaching by several universities.
