= Apaadi =

2009 Nigerian historical drama film

- Film poster
- Directed by: Abiodun Olanrewaju
- Produced by: Funke Akindele
- Starring: Funke Akindele; Femi Adebayo; Yinka Quadri; Taiwo Hassan; Adebayo Salami; Ronke Odusanya; Peju Ogunmola; Opeyemi Aiyeola; Sola Kosoko; Moji Olaiya; Lola Margret; Peter Fatomilola
- Production company: Scene One Productions
- Distributed by: Olasco Films Nig. Ltd.
- Release date: 2009
- Country: Nigeria
- Language: Yoruba

Apaadi is a 2009 Yoruba language Nigerian film. It's the first epic film produced by Funke Akindele and she also starred as one of the main characters in the movie, playing the King's niece. The film was nominated in the 2009 Africa Movie Academy Awards for Best Film in an African Language and Achievement in Costume categories, and Femi Adebayo was nominated for Best Actor in a Supporting Role for his performance in this film.

== Cast ==
- Funke Akindele
- Femi Adebayo
- Yinka Quadri
- Taiwo Hassan
- Adebayo Salami
- Ronke Odusanya
- Peju Ogunmola
- Opeyemi Aiyeola
- Sola Kosoko
- Moji Olaiya
- Lola Margaret
- Peter Fatomilola

== Awards and nominations ==
Year	Award	Category	Recipient	Result	Ref
2009	Africa Movie Academy Awards	Best Film in African Language	Apaadi	Nominated	
2009	Africa Movie Academy Awards	Achievement in Costume	Apaadi	Nominated	
2009	Africa Movie Academy Awards	Best Supporting Actor	Femi Adebayo	Nominated	
