= Bruno Iwuoha =

Nigerian actor (died 2021)

- Born: Bruno Obinna Iwuoha
- Occupation: Actor
- Awards: Best Supporting Actor award at the 3rd Africa Movie Academy Awards

Chief Bruno Obinna Iwuoha (died 10 April 2021) was a Nigerian actor. He won the Best Supporting Actor award at the 3rd Africa Movie Academy Awards for his performance in the movie "Sins of the Flesh".

== Filmography ==
Year	Title	Role
2019	Why Not?	Chief Mudoga
2017	Dilemma	Baba
2015	Love Circle	Igwu
2008	The Wrong Money	Don Amos
2007	Kingdom Apart	Senator Ubaka
2006	Magic Cap	Ichie Bullion
2006	Keeping Close	Ifedi
2005	Another Bondage	Papa Janet
2005	Eagle's Bride	Igwe Eliweuzo
2005	Occultic Battle	
2005	The Prince and The Princess	
2005	Sins Of The Flesh	
2004	World Apart	Benedict
2004	Faces Of Beauty	Chief Edward
2004	My Own Share	
2003	Billionaire's Club	
	Days Of Hatred	
	Two Bad Boys	
	Double Mind	
2003	Forever Yours	
2003	Jealous Lovers	
	My Portfolio	
