= Lere Paimo =

Nigerian film actor (born 1939)

- Born: 19 November 1939 (age 86); Ogbomosho, Southern Region, British Nigeria (now in Oyo State, Nigeria)
- Other name: Eda Onile Ola
- Occupations: Actor; filmmaker; producer; director
- Years active: 1958–Present
- Awards: MFR

Lere Paimo, MFR (born 19 November 1939) is a Nigerian film actor, film maker, producer, and director.

== Early life ==
Chief Lere Paimo, MFR, was born on November 19, 1939, in Ile Ikoyi Odan, Osupa, Ogbomosho, a city in Oyo State southwestern Nigeria. His father was a tobacco and yam farmer, the leader of the local farmers' organization. His mother was a trader. Chief Lere Paimo was sent to primary school in Ogbomoso but then left for the Gold Coast (current day Ghana) where he continued his education up to teacher training college, where he obtained a teacher's grade two certificate. He eventually returned back to Nigeria and decided to stay in Osogbo where he worked as a classroom teacher in a Baptist missionary school.

== Career ==
He began acting in 1958 after he joined the Oyin Adejobi theatre group, a theatre group founded by Pa Oyinade Adejobi, before he later joined Duro Ladipo's Theatre Group, where he featured in a stage play titled Obamoro with the role of "Chief Basa".

He became popular following a lead role as Soun Ogunola played in an epic yoruba film titled Ogbori Elemosho, which brought him into the limelight. He had featured, produced, and directed several Nigerian films since he began acting in 1963.

Around 1960, while working as a teacher in Osogbo, he decided to join the Oyin Adejobi theatre group, a theatre group founded by Pa Oyinade Adejobi, which was an organization performing plays for churches, schools, and cultural and social clubs. A year later, in about 1961, Duro Ladipo invited him to Mbari Club, the cultural centre founded by Ulli Beier, to take part in an art production. He was interested in painting as well as in theatre, so he accepted the invitation.

From the beginning, Lere Paimo's talent as an actor was recognized and he was given leading roles. In Eda, a Yoruba version of Everyman, he played Everyman himself so memorably that up till today his nickname has remained Eda Onile ola. While with Duro Ladipo, he featured in a stage play titled Obamoro with the role of "Chief Basa".

In 2005, in recognition of his immense contributions to the Nigerian film industry, he was bestowed a National Award of Member of the Federal Republic alongside Zeb Ejiro by Olusegun Obasanjo the former President of the Federal Republic of Nigeria.

In May 2013, it was reported that he had a partial stroke, an attack he survived.

In April 2014, he won a ₦1,000,000 cash prize in a Nigerian game show, Who Wants to be a MIllionaire.

== Filmography ==
Year	Film	Role	Note(s)
1994	Ayọ Ni Mọ Fẹ		
1997	O Le Ku	Adeleke	
1999	Saworoide	Balogun	
2002	Agogo Eewo	Balogun	
2004	The Campus Queen	Chief Bongo	
2008	Arugba	Baba Kekere	

== Awards ==
- Order of the Federal Republic (2005)
