= Lola Margaret =

Nigerian actress, film producer and director

- Born: Lola Margaret Oladipupo; Ilesa, Osun State, Nigeria
- Occupations: Actress; film director; film producer
- Years active: 2008–present

Lola Margaret (born Lola Margaret Oladipupo) is a Nigerian actress,"Flaunting marriages, relationships expose one to danger –Lola Margaret". Punch Newspapers. 26 June 2022. film producer and film director. Lola lost her parents in 1999 and lived all her childhood life with her aunt. Her career came into the limelight after she starred as the lead character in the movie Bisola Alanu.

== Early life and education ==
Margaret was born in Ilesa, Osun State, southwestern Nigeria where she went on to complete her basic and secondary school education and her west Africa examination certificate (WAEC). She holds a Bachelor of Arts degree in History and International Relations after graduating from Lagos State University.

== Career ==
Margaret's acting career started after she met Bolaji Amusan, a Nigerian comic actor who introduced her to acting. Her career came to the limelight after she played the lead character in the movie Bisola Alanu. Lola has also starred in several movies, including Eyin Akuko and Omo Oloro, a film she produced starring the likes of Fathia Balogun and Mercy Aigbe.

== Selected filmography ==
- Apaadi, 2009
- Bisola Alanu 2014
- Eyin Akuko, 2008
- Omo Oloro, 2016
- Agbara Ife (The Power of Love), 2016
- Sparrow, 2021

== See also ==
- List of Nigerian film producers
