= Emeka Ike =

Nigerian actor (born 1967)

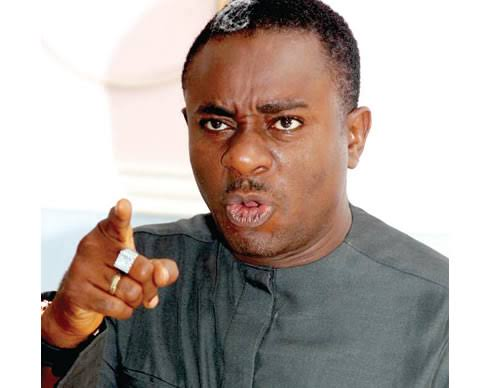
- Born: 22 March 1967 (age 59); Lagos, Nigeria
- Occupations: Actor, filmmaker, educator
- Years active: 1992-present
- Spouse: Yolanda Pfeiffer
- Children: 5

Emeka Ike (born 22 March 1967)// is a Nigerian actor and filmmaker, widely regarded as one of the leading figures of Nollywood during the late 1990s and early 2000s. He rose to prominence for his roles in romantic and dramatic films that defined Nigeria's home-video film era.

He was a special guest in Monrovia on the occasion of the commissioning of the new pavilion of Center for Democratic Change CDC, in Liberia.

== Early life ==
Emeka Ike was born in Lagos, Nigeria, to parents originally from Imo State, Elder Nicholas Ike and Comfort Ike. He grew up in Lagos, where he completed his primary and secondary education at Eko Primary School in Bariga, Lagos, and at Apata Memorial High School in Isolo, Lagos, respectively. He later studied mechanical engineering at Yaba College of Technology.

== Career ==
Ike began acting while still a student and quickly became a prominent figure in Nollywood. His first major feature film was Deadly Affair in 1994, which brought him into the spotlight and helped establish him as a leading man in the burgeoning Nigerian film industry. His performances often portrayed intense romantic leads and morally complex characters, helping him become one of the most recognisable actors of the period.

At the peak of his career, he starred alongside leading Nollywood actresses such as Genevieve Nnaji, Omotola Jalade Ekeinde, Rita Dominic, Chioma Chukwuka, and Kate Henshaw. Ike was then considered one of the industry's most bankable actors, and his work contributed significantly to the popularity and expansion of Nollywood during its formative years. However, he later took an extended break from acting due to personal and professional challenges. In subsequent years, he has made a gradual return to the screen, appearing in select film projects and public engagements. Some Nollywood actors including Yul Edochie, have mentioned Ike as their acting inspiration. He acted in the 2023 movie titled Malaika, produced by Toyin Abraham.

=== Controversy ===
Ike publicly criticised the leadership of the Actors Guild of Nigeria and was involved in a long-running factional dispute within the organisation, which at times included court battles and rival leadership claims. In 2016, Ike was appointed president of the Actors Guild of Nigeria (AGN) following a court ruling that removed the previous president from office. Although he was appointed AGN president in the mid-2010s, he later lost an election to Emeka Rollas at a 2017 peace and reconciliation conference, effectively ending his bid to lead the guild. He also reconciled with fellow Actors Guild of Nigeria (AGN) figures Segun Arinze and Ibinabo Fiberesima, both of whom previously served as presidents of the guild, following the prolonged leadership disputes. In 2026, Emeka Ike slammed Jaruma for using his photo in a viral video of his son on her page.

== Personal life ==
Emeka Ike married Suzanne Emma Rero in 2000, and the couple had four children together. Their marriage was dissolved in 2017 following a highly publicized legal process. In 2023, Ike announced the death of his mother, Comfort Ike, on social media, describing her as his "hero." The actor got remarried to Yolanda Pfeiffer. They have a daughter named Chidera Comfort Thando Ike.

In 2018, Ike announced his intention to run for the Federal House of Representatives, representing Okigwe South Constituency under the Young Progressives Party (YPP).

== Filmography ==
Year	Title	Role		
1994	Deadly affairs		1995	True Confession
1996	Moral Inheritance			
1996	Silent Night		1997	Day Break
2001	Death Warrant			
2001	My Goodwill			
2002	Tears & Sorrows			
2002	My love			
	Love Affair			
2003	Not Man Enough			
2004	Strength of a woman			
2004	I Swear			
2006	The Snake Girl	Ikem		
2009	My Last Wedding	Benny		
2007	100 Days in the Jungle	Brume Okito		
2008	Heavy Battle	Obiora		
2008	After My Heart	Nicholas		
2008	Test My Heart			
2008	A Can of Worms			
2008	Wind of Love	Raymond		
	Felony			
	Day break			
	Working for Love			
	Under Pressure			
2009	Love, Lies and Murder	Ken		
2009	Heat of the Moment	Dr. Richard		
2010	Night Wedding	Chiegbo		
2011	Jewels in the Sun	Duncan		
2012	Housemates	Patrick Bolaji		
2013	Stigma	Doctor Jide		
2014	Secret Act	Eddy		
2016	Golden Love	Arinze		
2016	Marry Who You Love	Duncan		
2019	Royal Calabash	Akunna		
2023	Malaika	Dr. Njoku		

== See also ==
- List of Nigerian actors
