= 3rd Africa Movie Academy Awards =

2007 film awards ceremony

- Date: Saturday, 10 March 2007
- Site: Gloryland Cultural Center; Yenagoa, Bayelsa State, Nigeria
- Hosted by: Richard Mofe-Damijo, Thami Ngubeni
- Organized by: Africa Film Academy

Highlights
- Best Picture: Sitanda
- Most awards: Sitanda (5)
- Most nominations: Abeni (film) (11); The Amazing Grace (11)

The 3rd Africa Movie Academy Awards ceremony was held on 10 March 2007 at the Gloryland Cultural Center in Yenagoa, Bayelsa State, Nigeria, to honour the best African films of 2006. The ceremony was broadcast live on Nigerian national television. Numerous African & international celebrities and top Nigerian politicians attended the event, including Nigerian musician Tuface Idibia and Ghanaian hiplife band VIP. Nollywood actor Richard Mofe-Damijo and South African actress Thami Ngubeni hosted the ceremony. Special guests of honour were Academy Award winners Cuba Gooding, Jr. and Mo'Nique. Nollywood's favourite acting duo Osita Iheme and Chinedu Ikedieze received the Lifetime Achievement Award.

== Winners ==
=== Major awards ===
The winners of the 19 Award Categories are listed first and highlighted in bold letters.

Best Picture	Best Director
Sitanda; The Amazing Grace; Apesin; Abeni	Izu Ojukwu – Sitanda; Muyiwa Ademola – Apesin; Jeta Amata – The Amazing Grace; Tunde Kelani – Abeni
Best Actress in a leading role	Best Actor in a leading role
Chioma Chukwuka – Sins of the Flesh; Khabirat Kafidipe – Iwalewa; Nadia Buari – Beyonce: The President's Daughter	Olu Jacobs – Dancing Heart; Ganiu Nofiu – Apesin; Kunle Abogunloko – Covenant Church; Ayo Lijadu – Maroko
Best Actress in a Supporting Role	Best Actor in a Supporting Role
Jackie Aygemang – Beyonce: The President's Daughter; Noelie Funmi Agbendegba – Abeni; Ireti Doyle – Sitanda	Bruno Iwuoha – Sins of the Flesh; Obi Okoli – Explosion; Yinka Quadri – Abeni; Fred Amata – The Amazing Grace
Best Upcoming Artist	Best Performance by a Child
Ali Nuhu – Sitanda; Amzat Abdel Hakim – Abeni; Mbong Odungide – The Amazing Grace; Moumouni Sanou – Mokili	Samuel Olaseinde – Abeni; Teco Benson Jnr – Explosion; Somadina Adinma – Speak the word
Best Indigenous Film	Best Nigerian Film
Irapada; Apesin; Abeni; Iwalewa	Sitanda; Apesin; The Amazing Grace; Abeni

=== Additional awards ===
Best Cinematography	Best Original Screen Play
The Amazing Grace; Abeni; Mokili; Sitanda	Sitanda; Maroko; Dancing Heart; Azima
Best Original Sound Track	Best Sound
Iwalewa; Sitanda; Bunny Chow	Abeni; The Amazing Grace; Sitanda; Mokili
Best Edit	Best Visual Effect
Mokili; Abeni; The Amazing Grace	Snake Girl; Explosion; Apesin; The Amazing Grace
AMAA Achievement in Makeup	AMAA Achievement in Costume
Azima; Maroko; Covenant Church; The Amazing Grace	Apesin; Azima; The Amazing Grace; Bunny Chow
Best Documentary Feature
Conversations on a Sunday Afternoon; Covenant Church; Bitter Water Mara

== Films with multiple nominations ==
The following films received multiple nominations.

- 11 nominations
  - Abeni
  - The Amazing Grace
  9 nominations
  - Sitanda
  7 nominations
  - Apesin
  4 nominations
  - Mokili
- 3 nominations
  - Azima
  - Iwalewa
  - Explosion
  - Maroko
  - Covenant Church
  2 nominations
  - Sins of the Flesh
  - Beyonce: The President's Daughter
  - Bunny Chow
  - Dancing Heart

== Films with multiple awards ==
The following films received multiple awards.

- 5 awards
  - Sitanda
- 3 awards
  - Abeni
- 2 awards
  - Sins of the Flesh
