= Peju Ogunmola =

Actress

- Born: Peju Ogunmola; Nigeria
- Citizenship: Nigeria
- Occupation: Actress
- Spouse: Sunday Omobolanle
- Children: Bolaji Ogunmola (Omobolanle), Wale Ogunmola
- Father: Kola Ogunmola

Peju Ogunmola is a Yoruba film actress who stars in Nollywood movies of Yoruba genres. Her father was the veteran actor Kola Ogunmola.

She is the wife of Sunday Omobolanle, a Nigerian comic actor, playwright, film director, and producer. She is the stepmother of Sunkanmi Omobolanle, who is also an actor.

== Early life ==
Peju is from the Ekiti state town of Okemesi. Kola Ogunmola, her father, was an actor in Nigerian cinema. She is also Yomi Ogunmola's sister, a well-known Yoruba actor who died in 2003.

== Career ==
Peju has achieved success as a comedic performer, playwright, director, and producer. Maradona (2003), Mafi wonmi (2008), Toromade (2009), and Apaadi are some of her best-known works.

Peju Ogunmola and Tubosin Odunsin visited Osun State University as guests in July 2017. (UNIOSUN). The program ran from July 20 to July 22 and was called UNIOSUN Illumination. The program included theater, dancing music, talk programs, celebrity interviews, and empowerment seminars. Samson Braimah, Temitope Balogun, Prof. Kizito, Ore-Ofe Williams, Seun Fagbemi, Cymbals, Niyi Adebanjo, Sisdab, and other guests also attended the performance.

== Personal life ==
Peju is the second spouse of Sunday Omobolanle, also known as Papiluwe, a comedic performer and producer.

== Filmography ==
- Apaadi (2009)
- Omo Ghetto: The Saga (2010) as Ayomide's Mother
- King of Thieves (2022) as Lalopne
- Beast of Two Worlds (2024) as Iyalode
- House of Ga'a (2024) as Iyaloja
