= Sunkanmi Omobolanle =

Nigerian film actor and director

- Born: 1 March 1981 (age 45); Oyo State, Nigeria
- Citizenship: Nigerian
- Education: B.sc Business Administration, Olabisi Onabanjo University
- Alma mater: Olabisi Onabanjo University
- Occupation: actor
- Notable work: Kakanjo
- Spouse: Abimbola Bakare
- Parent: Sunday Omobolanle (father)

Sunkanmi Omobolanle is a Nigerian film actor and director.

== Early life and career ==
He was born on March 1, 1981. He hails from Ilora, a town in Oyo State southwestern Nigeria. He is the son of the veteran comic actor, Sunday Omobolanle, popularly known as "Papi Luwe". He attended the Nigerian Military School before he proceeded to Olabisi Onabanjo University where he obtained a bachelor's degree in business administration. He married Abimbola Bakare in 2011. He has featured and directed several Nigerian movies.

== Filmography ==
- Ayomida (2003) as Cousin
- Olaide Irawo (2007)
- Gongo Aso (2008)
- Eti Keta (2011) as Ajadi
- Alakada 2 (2013) as Bayo
- Head Gone (2014)
- Jail (2017) as Kingsley
- Upside Down (2018) as Obiagu
- Ofeefe (2019) as Delani
- Kakanfo (2020) as Tolu
- A Dream Called Death (2020) as Tony
- The Alternative (2022) as Lanre
