= Thunderbolt: Magun =

- Directed by: Tunde Kelani
- Written by: Adebayo Faleti
- Screenplay by: Femi Kayode
- Produced by: Tunde Kelani
- Starring: Lanre Balogun; Uche Osotule; Ngozi Nwosu; Bukky Ajayi, Yemi Solade, Ikem Emordi, Byron Ene, Tunde Awosanmi, Adebayo Faleti, Bose Aderibigbe
- Production company: Mainframe Films and Television Productions
- Release date: 2001
- Country: Nigeria
- Budget: $50,000

Thunderbolt: Magun is a 2001 Nigerian drama film directed and produced by Tunde Kelani. It was based on a book title Magun written by Adebayo Faleti and adapted for screenplay by Femi Kayode.

== Plot ==
Yinka, a Yoruba man falls in love with and marries Ngozi, an Igbo lady during their National Youth Service Corps (NYSC) program. Their marriage hits the rocks when false rumours of infidelity by Ngozi are made known to Yinka by his friends as Ngozi and Yinka spend long periods apart. His ego bruised and his insecurity heightened, Yinka engages the services of a babalawo who inflicts Ngozi with "Magun", a chastity control mechanism. Ngozi realises this and has a few days to live due to the effect of the magun. She enlists the help of her friend Janet and Mama Tutu who encourage her to accept Dr. Dimeji Taiwo's proposition. He is aware of the magun placed on Ngozi but mates with her for research purposes. In the process, he starts coughing up blood and is choking but is saved by the babalawo and Ngozi's curse is lifted.

== Cast ==
- Lanre Balogun as Yinka Ajiboye
- Uche Obi Osotule as Ngozi Ajiboye
- Ngozi Nwosu as Janet
- Bukky Ajayi as Mama Tutu
- Larinde Akinleye as Vee Pee
- Wale Macaulay as Dr. Dimeji Taiwo
- Adebayo Faleti as Herbalist
- Yemi Solade as Dele Ibrahim
- Ojuolape Abayomi as Female Teacher
- Bose Aderibigbe as Female Teacher
- Adebayo Faleti as Herbalist
- Tunde Awosanmi as Doctor
- Ikem Emordi as Papa
- Byron Ene as Ike

== Production and release ==
Magun translates to "do not climb", it is a traditional charm that is used to punish adulterous partners. The film explores the themes of the intersection between African belief in supernatural forces, modernity and sexual politics.

Thunderbolt: Magun was made with a DV calm and the budget for the film was about $50,000. It was released on VHS. It was listed as one of the 10 best selling Yoruba movies.

It screened at the Pan African Film Festival in Ouagadougou, Milan Italiano Film Festival and the African Film Festival in New York.
