= Remi Abiola =

Nigerian film actress

- Born: 30 March 1952
- Died: 29 July 2009 (aged 57); New York City
- Citizenship: Nigerian
- Occupations: Actress; director; producer
- Years active: 1970-2009
- Spouse: Moshood Abiola
- Children: 2

Remi Abiola (30 March 1952– 29 July 2009) was a Nigerian film actress and spouse of the late Moshood Abiola, a Nigerian business magnate and politician. She died of cancer in New York City on 29 July 2009.

== Career ==
Abiola trained as an actress at the Fielding School for Dramatic Arts in England in the 1970s after she left the defunct Nigerian Airways as a flight attendant. When she came back to Nigeria, she auditioned for roles and took part in a TV series anchored by Bayo Awala and Tunde Oloyede, which aired on NTA Channel 10.

She featured in the following movies:

- The Narrow Path (2006) as Iya Lape
- Igbeyin ewuro (2009) as Temitayo Agba
- Arugba (2009) as Tunrayo
- Maje npasan (2008)
- Iya oju ogun (2007)
- The Narrow Path (2006) as Iya Lape
- Iwalewa (2006)
- Iyawo Panda (2005)
- Botife (2004) as Iya Segun
- Real Love (2003)
- Akobi gomina (2002) as Mrs. Badmus
- Oduduwa (2000)
- Glamour Girls (1994) as Party Girl

== See also ==
- List of Nigerian film producers
