= Abeni (film) =

2007 Nigerian romance film

- Directed by: Tunde Kelani
- Written by: Yinka Ogun; François Okioh
- Starring: Jide Kosoko; Kareem Adepoju; Abdel Amzat; Bukky Wright
- Production companies: Dove Media, Laha Productions; Mainframe Film and Television Production
- Distributed by: Mainframe Film and Television Productions
- Release date: March 31, 2006
- Running time: 98 minutes
- Countries: Nigeria; Benin
- Languages: Yoruba; French

Abeni is a two-part 2007 Nigerian-Beninese romance film produced and directed by Tunde Kelani. It depicts the social divide that occurs as a result of colonialism despite the geographical proximity between Benin and Nigeria.

== Plot ==
Abeni follows the story of the eponymous Abeni who was born with a silver spoon. She meets Akanni who hails from a more modest background. They are engaged to be married to other people but their meeting changes the course of already set plans.

== Cast ==
- Kareem Adepoju as Baba Wande
- Abdel Hakim Amzat as Akanni
- Sola Asedeko as Abeni
- Samuel Ajirebi
- Jide Kosoko as Abeni's father
- Bukky Wright
- Idowu Philips
- Ayo Badmus
- Moufoutaou Akadiri
- Aboh M. Akinocho

== Production and release ==
Abeni was set in Yoruba-speaking areas of Nigeria and Cotonu. It employed the methods of Code-Switching, Code-Mixing and Code-Conflicting as it involved two languages and depicts how the characters overcame language barrier by paying close attention and employing the use of gesticulations.

It was a joint production between Mainframe Film and Television Productions and Laha Productions. It was released on 31 March 2006 with physical copies selling in post offices, banks and fast food joints.

== Critical reception ==
In a review for The Nation, Victor Akande wrote "With hilarious sub-plots woven through the core story of love lust and regains, this is a fascinating portrait of the Yoruba urban middle class that flows between Nigeria and Republic of Benin."

The film was nominated in 11 categories at the 3rd Africa Movie Academy Awards and won in 2 of the categories.

=== Awards and nominations ===
Year	Award	Category	Result	Ref
2007	Africa Movie Academy Awards	Best Sound	Won	
2007	Africa Movie Academy Awards	Best Film in an African Language	Nominated	
2007	Africa Movie Academy Awards	Best Nigerian Film	Nominated	
2007	Africa Movie Academy Awards	Best Cinematography	Nominated	
2007	Africa Movie Academy Awards	Best Indigenous Film	Nominated	
2007	Africa Movie Academy Awards	Best Performance by Child - Samuel Olaseinde	Won	
2007	Africa Movie Academy Awards	Best Edit	Nominated	
2007	Africa Movie Academy Awards	Best Upcoming Artiste - Amzat Abdel Hakim	Nominated	
2007	Africa Movie Academy Awards	Best Actress in Supporting Role - Noelie Funmi Agbendegba	Nominated	
2007	Africa Movie Academy Awards	Best Director - Tunde Kelani	Nominated	
2007	Africa Movie Academy Awards	Best Picture	Nominated	
2007	Nigerian Movie Awards	Best Picture	Won	
