= Laduntan Oyekanmi =

Theresa Laduntan Oyekanmi
- Ìyálóde of Ibadan
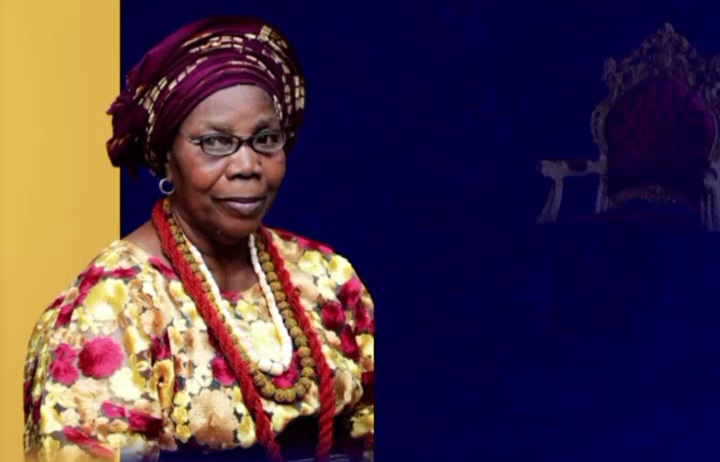

Ìyálóde of Ibadan
- Reign: July 2019–present
- Coronation: July 2019
- Predecessor: Aminatu Abiodun
- Born: Laduntan Ladapo; 1 October 1933 (age 92); Ibadan, British Nigeria
- Spouse: Prince Diti Oyekanmi (m. 1961)
- House: Aríléwọlá
- Dynasty: Ladapo
- Father: Chief Emmanuel Aremu Ladapo
- Mother: Madam Akanke Ladapo
- Religion: Christianity

Chief Theresa Laduntan Oyekanmi (born 1 October 1933) is the 14th Iyalode of Ibadan. She is a scion of the Ladapo family of Abebi Ibadan and the Ayeye area's Balogun Ibikunle family.

The prominence of the Ladapo and the Balogun Ibikunle interconnected families, particularly their longstanding ties to Ibadan’s traditional ruling lineages, provided a strong foundation for Oyekanmi’s later rise within the traditional leadership structure.She occupies one of the most prestigious traditional titles held by women in Yorubaland. Often described as the “female king,” she represents the interests and voice of women within the Olubadan-in-Council, the traditional governing council of Ibadan.

== Biography ==
Laduntan Oyekanmi was born in Ibadan, Nigeria, into the prominent family of the late Chief Emmanuel Aremu Ladapo, the then Seriki Balogun of Ibadanland (1875–1971), and Madam Akanke Ladapo, on 1 October 1933. Laduntan Oyekanmi pursued her primary education at Sacred Heart Convent School in Ibadan from 1945 to 1950. She then attended Saint Agnes Teachers Training College in Maryland, Lagos, for her tertiary education from 1951 to 1954. Subsequently, she traveled to Scotland and undertook preliminary nursing training at Victoria General Hospital in Kirkcaldy from 1958 to 1961. In 1961, she commenced her midwifery training at St. Mary’s Hospital, Whittington, London. Following this, she advanced to Battersea College of Technology (now the University of Surrey) for her health visitors training from 1963 to 1964. On 12 August 1961, she married Prince Diti Oyekanmi of the royal Matanmi Family of Osogbo, Osun State. She worked as a nurse at the University College Hospital in Ibadan until her retirement. Prince Oyekanmi, her husband, was a commissioner in the old Western Region in the 1970s and served in the cabinet of former Military Governor of Oyo State, Major General David M. Jemibewon.

On 17 October 1975, Laduntan was installed as Bada Iyalode of Ibadanland, by the 33rd Olubadan of Ibadanland, the late Oba Shittu Akintola, Oyetunde II, 1972–1976. She became Iyalode in July 2019, succeeding Aminatu Abiodun.

Following the death of Oba Saliu Adetunji, the 41st Olubadan of Ibadan, she backed Senator Lekan Balogun, who was later crowned the 42nd Olubadan of Ibadan on 11 March 2022. Theresa Laduntan Oyekanmi is the founder of the Iyalode Theresa Laduntan Oyekanmi Foundation. The foundation annually recognizes top graduates from the Nursing Education Department at University College Ibadan, including recent honorees in Community Health Nursing and Public Health Nursing.
