= Saworoide =

Nigerian political drama film

- Film poster
- Directed by: Tunde Kelani
- Written by: Akinwunmi Isola
- Produced by: Tunde Kelani; Yemi Shodimu
- Starring: Kola Oyewo; Bukky Wright; Lere Paimo; Larinde Akinleye; Peter Fatomilola; Kunle Bamtefa; Adebayo Faleti; Kayode Olaiya; Doyin Hassan; Jab Adu
- Cinematography: Tunde Kelani
- Edited by: Kehinde Aje; Musediq Alayaki; Noah Akinmade
- Music by: Orlando Julius
- Production companies: Mainframe Films and Television Productions
- Distributed by: Mainframe Films
- Release date: 1999
- Running time: 105 minutes
- Country: Nigeria
- Language: Yorùbá

Saworoide is a 1999 Nigerian political drama film, produced and directed by Tunde Kelani. It stars Kola Oyewo, Bukky Wright, Lere Paimo, Larinde Akinleye, Peter Fatomilola, Kunle Bamtefa, Adebayo Faleti, Kayode Olaiya and Doyin Hassan.

Saworoide depicts the setting of an old Yoruba norm in the town of Jogbo where a person can not be crowned king without a ritual which involves the playing of saworoide (English: brass bell talking drum). It was listed as one of the 10 best-selling Yoruba movies.

== Plot ==
In an ancient time in the town of Jogbo. The priest tells the king that there will be a pact between the citizens of Jogbo and their kings, using a brass bell in the ritual process, and that the ritual process would also be carried out of succeeding Kings.

A new king, Lapite has just been elected in Jogbo; there's been a long-standing saying that kings of Jogbo don't get to be influential and wealthy as kings of other territories. Lapite finds out from his friend and Chief, Balogun that it is due to the old tradition of rituals made to kings, and as a result Lapite cheats the process. Balogun however later learns from the same elderly man who told him, that anyone who cheats the process faces the consequences of sharing his kingship with someone else, and that if he ever listens to the Saworoide (brass bell) being played, he would die of headache. Lapite as a result sends assassins to kill the family of Adebomi, whom he considers to be threat (but they however didn't kill their kid), and also orders the capture of the custodian of Saworoide, Ayangalu, along with his drum. Ayangalu is however tipped off by one of the chiefs and he escapes together with Adeboro's son, leaving behind Saworoide to be captured.

The new king takes another wife, Tinuola, who's already pregnant for her lover, but has been advised to keep it a secret so as not to lose the life changing opportunity of being a queen. Lapite connives with modern investors to start mass exploration of the town's resources, particularly logging, and nonchalantly destroying people's crops in the process. The Chiefs and King start to live a life of opulence, silencing the press by all means. Lapite also refuses to listen to the citizens of Jogbo who constantly stage protests against the goings on. As a result, militancy arises amongst the farm owners and they start to attack the workers on their farms, which led to the workers going on strike.

Lapite starts going against members of his cabinet, making arrests and becoming a tyrant. Some members of the farm owners' association consult the town priest, Amawomaro and they are told that the only way out is to make sure the Adé idẹ (Brass Crown) is absent from the palace for 15 days. The militants seek external help; one of the logging firms gives funds, but secretly to use them naively for their own interest. They stage several attacks such as hijacking a ceremony to steal the king's crown, which is later recovered with the help of the logging firms after being given a bribe.

Aresejabata starts to make friends with Araparegangan the supposed daughter of Lapite. He opens up to her that while tipsy, that he is the son of Adebomi that was killed. Lapite finds out and orders the assassination of Aresejabata, not minding Arapa being killed in the process. Tinuola overhears and tells her daughter to run away along with Arese from the gathering and the village. The military stages a successful coup, killing Lapite; Officer Lagata takes over the government of Jogbo. Balogun and Seriki again liaise with the new government.

The former militants plan to kill the new king by making Ayangalu, who has been in exile to play the Saworoide in Jogbo. One of the militants betray them and Ayangalu is arrested. Ayangalu has however used his drum to call on his son just before he is arrested. His son, Ayanniyi returns and plays the Saworoide just after Lagata is crowned, and he subsequently dies of migraine. The soldiers are hypnotized to be on the side of the people; Aresejabata receives the initiation to become king.

== Cast ==
- Kola Oyewo as Oba Lapite
- Bukky Wright as Olori Tinuola
- Lere Paimo as Balogun
- Larinde Akinleye as Seriki
- Ayantunji Amoo as Ayangalu
- Peter Fatomilola as Amawomaro
- Kunle Bamtefa as Ogagun Lagata
- Adebayo Faleti as Baba Opalaba
- Kayode Olaiya as Bada
- Laide Adewale as Otun
- Jab Adu as Lagbayi
- Tunde Salisu as Kujenra
- Moji Bamtefa as Agbegilodo
- Doyin Hassan as Olojowon
- Lai Karounwi as Fadiya
- Kunle Afolayan as Aresejabata
- Kabirat Kafidipe as Araparegangan
- Biodun Aleja as Kangidi
- Bose Adewoyin as Asabi
- Akinwunmi Isola as Ifa Priest
- Tunde Ojeyemi as Inspector of Police
- Goroso as Adebomi
- Segun Oni as Ayanniyi

== Sequel ==
The sequel to Saworoide is titled Agogo Eewo and was released in 2002. Kelani announced that he was working on a prequel titled Iyan Esuru via his Twitter handle on 10 April 2021.
