= Kola Ogunmola =

Nigerian dramatist and playwright (1925–1973)

Elijah Kolawole Ogunmola
- Born: Elijah Kolawole Ogunmola; 11 November 1925; Okemesi, Southern Region, British Nigeria (now in Ekiti State, Nigeria)
- Died: 1973 (aged 47–48)
- Occupation: Actor
- Years active: 1925–1973

Elijah Kolawole Ogunmola// (11 November 1925 – 1973) was a Nigerian dramatist, actor, mime, director, and playwright. Ogunmola is also regarded as one of the most brilliant actors in Africa in the 1950s and ’60s.

He developed Yoruba culture, especially folk opera (drama that combines Christian themes with traditional Yoruba folklore, music and dancing, and music popular in urban culture) into a serious theatre form through his work with his Ogunmola Travelling Theatre (founded c. 1948).

They produced an early stage musical version of Amos Tutuola's The Palm Wine Drinkard, which was performed at the First Pan-African Cultural Congress (Algiers, 1969).

He produced Ife Owo in 1965. It was a satire on marriage and wealth. He used Mime and singing as well as drumming to convey his message. He also produced the dramatic version of Tutuola's The Palmwine Drinker. He also exhibited great ability in acting and directing.

He married numerous wives and had many children. Among his children are notable Nollywood Stars, such as Abayomi Ogunmola and Peju Ogunmola Omobolanle.

== Life and career ==
Elijah Kolawole Ogunmola was born to the family of George Ogunmola and Aina Ogunmola in the town of Okemesi-Ekiti on November 11, 1925. Before his start in professional theatre, Ogunmola was a schoolmaster in Ado-Ekiti. At Emmanuel School, Ado-Ekiti, Ogunmola created school plays performed by students inside and sometimes outside the school. He formed his drama troupe, Ogunmola's Theatre Party around some of the pupils and his fellow teachers. The troupe was modeled after Ogunde's Theatre Party and some of his early operas like "Reign of the Mighty", one of his early plays reveal a Christian influence. Ogunmola's early performances were staged in the Ekiti region of Nigeria. He was known as a performer who was sensitive to the quality of the acting on stage. Like Ogunde, most of his early work were Yoruba folk operas. The rhythm is provided by drums played in the background, the songs are in Yoruba language and dancing was an integral part of the play.

In the 1950s, Ogunmola's theatre traveled extensively throughout the Western region of Nigeria, performing in schools, churches and halls. Though the group performed the same set of plays in every city, the audience can get a unique feeling from seeing each play. Ogunmola's plays allowed for improvisational acting on stage and with each performance, he left room for the unexpected. His acting is also influenced by the feelings of the moment while his knowledge of Yoruba culture and human nature grew with each performance. One of his popular plays, "Love for Money", is a story about a wealthy man who fell for a temptress and as a result separated from his wife. However, his relationship with the temptress ruined him.

In 1955, he moved to Oshogbo from the Ekiti region.

In 1962, University of Ibadan established a drama school and Ogunmola was offered a grant to become a resident artist. The artist in residence program was sponsored by Rockefeller Foundation and it provided Ogunmola funds to buy equipment that soon allowed him to go fully professional. Ogunmola's most famous play, a loose adaptation of Amos Tutuola's the Palmwine Drinkard was a result of his collaboration with the School of Drama at Ibadan. When Ogunmola was at Ibadan, he was given a script written by Tutuola to translate into a Yoruba drama. The results was"Lanke Omuti" also known as Palmwine Drinkard. The premier of the play was at the university, Designed and Directed by Demas Nwoko who worked on the production and stage design of the play also. In the 1960s, Palmwine Drinkard received recognition in Nigeria and abroad. He became more popular after his six months residency at Ibadan partly due to the success of Palmwine Drinkard. The play was a serious contender with Ọba kò so, the eventual nominee for Nigeria's nomination to the Commonwealth arts festival in 1965.

Ogunmola suffered a stroke in 1970 and his health continued to decline until he died in 1973 at the age of 48.

== Sources ==
- Smith, Judith Hoch (1975). Yoruba theater in Ibadan: Performance and urban social process (PhD). McGill University (Canada). OCLC 895894409.
- Welch, David (1972). Aspects of Vocal Performance in Shango Praise Poetry and Song (PhD). Northwestern University. OCLC 03865609.
- Beier, Ulli (1981). "E.K. Ogunmola: A Personal Memoir". In Ogunbiyi, Yemi (ed.). Drama and Theatre in Nigeria: A Critical Source Book. Nigeria Magazine. pp. 321–331. ISBN 9781730080.
