= Adebayo Faleti =

Nigerian actor (1921–2017)

- Born: Adebayo Mosobalaje Faleti; 26 December 1921; Oyo, Southern Region, British Nigeria (now in Oyo State, Nigeria)
- Died: 23 July 2017 (aged 95); Ibadan, Oyo State, Nigeria
- Education: University of Ibadan, Nigeria, University of Dakar, Senegal
- Occupations: Actor, poet, writer
- Known for: Poems
- Parents: Joseph Akanbi Faleti (father); Durowade Ayinke Faleti (mother)

Adebayo Mosobalaje Faleti (26 December 1921 – 23 July 2017) was Africa's first newscaster, Africa's first stage play director, Nigeria's first film editor and librarian with the first television station in Africa - Western Nigeria Television (WNTV), Nigeria's first Yoruba presenter on television and radio alike, a Nigerian poet, journalist, writer, Nollywood film director and actor. He was also known as a Yoruba translator, a broadcaster, TV exponent and pioneer of the first television station in Africa, Western Nigeria Television (WNTV), now known as the Nigerian Television Authority (NTA).

== Early life and education ==
Faleti was born in Agbo-Oye, Oyo State in Nigeria, though lived in Obananko, Kuranga, near Oyo State. Adebayo Faleti was the first son of his father, Joseph Akanbi Faleti and the only child of his mother, Durowade Ayinke Faleti. Faleti had a passion for drama from an early age. His parents could not fund his education to pursue his dreams due to lack of income, so he had to put his primary education on hold. In his twenties, he started his own successful theatre group with colleagues and it was named Oyo Youth Operatic Society (founded in 1949). Faleti got a job in a primary school, where he worked for six years to raise enough funds for his secondary schooling with the financial support of his father. In 1966, he attended the University of Dakar in Senegal and obtained a Certificate of proficiency in French Language and Civilization. Two years later, he graduated from the University of Ibadan, Nigeria, with an honors degree in Lit-in-English. In 1971, he attended the Radio Netherlands Training Center in Hilversum, the Netherlands, and received a certificate in Television Production.

== Personal life and Death ==
Faleti's wife was Olori Olubunmi Faleti, a retired broadcaster and television host at the Nigerian Television Authority (NTA), Ibadan. He had children, grandchildren and great-grandchildren. Faleti died on July 23, 2017, after observing a brief morning devotion with his family at his Ojoo residence in Ibadan.

== Career ==
Faleti has written, produced and acted in several popular Yoruba plays. He is also known for his poems. He was the first school teacher at Ife Odan, located near Ejigbo Town in Osun State. He was also the General Manager of the Broadcasting Corporation of Oyo State (BCOS), which is also known as Radio OYO, Ibadan. In 1959, he worked at Western Nigerian Television (WNTV), now known as NTA Ibadan, as a film editor and a librarian.

== Works ==
Faleti acted, wrote, and produced a number of movies, including: Thunderbolt: Magun (2001), Afonja (1 & 2) (2002), Basorun Gaa (2004), and Sawo-Sogberi (2005).

He was responsible for translating Nigeria's National Anthem from English to Yoruba, his native language. He also translated speeches being made by former Attorney-General of the Federal Republic of Nigeria - Chief Bola Ige, former military president of Nigeria - General Ibrahim Babangida, former premier of the Western region of Nigeria — Chief Obafemi Awolowo and Head, National Interim Government of Nigeria — Chief Ernest Shonekan, from English to Yoruba. Faleti published a dictionary containing the formal or official use of Yoruba names.

== Awards ==
Adebayo Faleti has received many awards, both locally and internationally, including the National Honour Of Officer Of the Order of the Niger (OON), Doctor of Letters (D.Litt.), Justice of Peace (JP), Jerusalem Pilgrim (JP). Adebayo Faleti received the Festival of Arts award with "Eda Ko L’aropin" in 1995 and the Afro-Hollywood Award for Outstanding Performance in Arts in the United States (in 2002). His movie - "Basorun Gaa" also received a commendation at Breeze Awards in London as the best epic movie of the year in 2004. The first magazine he wrote for was called Triumph when he was at the University of Ibadan as an undergraduate. He was also a columnist with the Nigerian Tribune.
