= Dele Odule =

Nigerian actor and producer (born 1959)

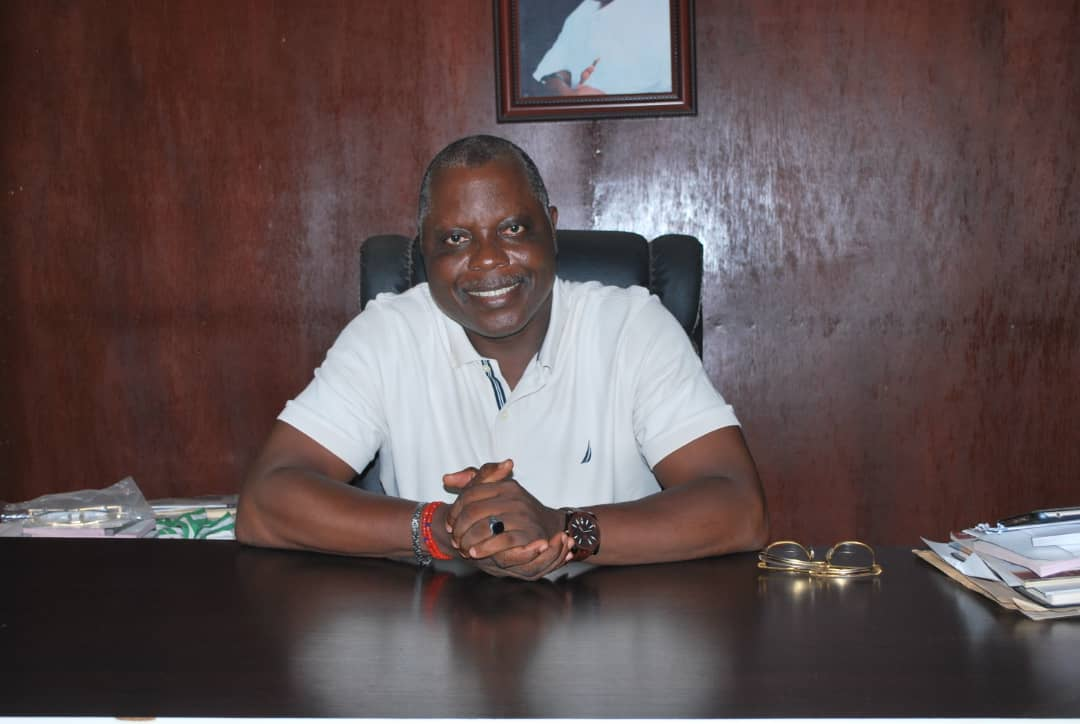
- Born: 23 November 1959 (age 66); Ile-Ife, Western Region, Nigeria (now in Osun State, Nigeria)
- Education: University of Ibadan
- Occupations: Actor; thespian; film producer; film director
- Years active: 1986–present
- Notable work: Ti Oluwa Ni Ile

Dele Odule (born 23 November 1959) is a Nigerian film actor, producer, director, and screenwriter. He was nominated in the "Best Supporting Actor (Yoruba)" category at the 2014 Best of Nollywood Awards for his role in the film Kori Koto. He currently serves as the President of the Theatre arts and Movie Practitioners Association of Nigeria.

== Early life and education ==
Odule was born on 23 November 1961 in the town of Ile-Ife, Osun State in the southwest region of Nigeria, but hails from Oru Ijebu, in Ijebu North local government area of Ogun State, Nigeria, where he had his basic and secondary school education. He holds a Grade II Certificate from the Teacher's Training College, Oru before he proceeded to the University of Ibadan, Oyo State where he studied Theatre Arts.

== Career ==
Dele started acting in a drama group called Oloko Theatre Group under the mentorship of Mukaila Adebisi. He made his debut appearance in 1986 before he shot into the limelight after starring in the movie titled Ti Oluwa Ni Ile. He has since gone on to star in over 200 movies. He is also currently an ambassador for Airtel Nigeria.

== Selected filmography ==
- Ti Oluwa Ni Ile (1993)
- Bisi (1994?)
- The Duplicate (Eya) (1994?)
- Grandfather (Baba Agba) (1994) (also writer and producer)
- Mojere (1994?)
- Queen of the Dark (Arewa Okunrun) (1994)
- Agony of Love (Iya Ife) (1995?)
- Ewo-lewo (1995?)
- Go to Hell (Pa'ra E) (1995)
- Scape Goat (Eran Iya) (1995)
- Twins (Edunjobi) (1995)
- B'aiyetigba (1996) (also writer and producer)
- Epon Agbo (1996)
- Temi Yemi (1996) (also director)
- Voice of the People (Ohun Eniyan) (1996)
- Ade Ori (1997)
- Aiyedun (1997?)
- Alaba Meta (1997?)
- Death of a Beauty Queen (Iku Arewa) (1997?)
- Ignorance (Igba Aimo) (1997?)
- Lakunle Alagbe (1997)
- Omolara (1997)
- Eleti Ikun (1998?) (also director and producer)
- It's Compulsory (Odidandan) (1998?)
- Iya Adinni (1998?)
- The Prisoner (1998?)
- Oduduwa (2000)
- Afonja (2002) asAmoo
- Abela Pupa (2003)
- Olorire (2003) as Tomori
- Ògédé Didùn (2003) as Tunde
- Ogbologbo (2003)
- Youth Corper (Agubaniro) (2003)
- Ayotunde (2004?)
- God Owns All Land (2004)
- Suku Suku Bam Bam (2004)
- Omo Olè (2004)
- Afitimbaku (2005)
- Axe Blade (Enu Aake) (2005)
- Babalola: Isaiah 41:10–13 (2005?)
- Black Box (Apoti Dudu) (2005?)
- Eru Ife (2005)
- Iwe Akosile (2005)
- Idajo Mi Tide (2005)
- Love Hates Pride (Ife Ko Faari) (2005?)
- Asebi Sebaje (2006)
- Ate Gagara (2006)
- Fopomoyo (2006)
- Oore Niwon (2006)
- Ó kojá Ofin (2007)
- Aye Ibironke (2007)
- Eje Orisa (2007)
- Omo Ode De (2007)
- Rain (Ojo) (2007)
- Bolode O'ku (2009) as Ayoola
- Aworo (2012)
- The Ghost and the Tout (2018) as Chief Obanikoro
- Survival of Jelili (2019)
- Kakanfo (2020) as Sen. Ayelabola
- The New Patriots (2020) as Chief Balogun
- The Mystic River (2021) as Balogun
- Ile Alayo (2021)
- King of Thieves (2022) as 2nd Otun
- Ada Omo Daddy (2023) as Chief Balogun
- Jagun Jagun (2023) as Alarinka
- Deity (2023) as Oloye Otun
- Malaika (2023)
- Funmilayo Ransome-Kuti (2024) as Osi
- House of Gaa (2024) as Alafin Majeogbe
- Aiye Nika (2024) as Daddy Adediwura
- Move Like a Boss (2024) as Hassan

== Awards and nominations ==
Year	Award ceremony	Prize	Result	Ref
2014	2014 Best of Nollywood Awards	Best Supporting Actor (Yoruba)	Nominated	
2014	2014 Yoruba Movie Academy Awards	Best Actor in Supporting Role	Won	
2020	Best of Nollywood Awards	Best Supporting Actor –Yoruba	Nominated	

== See also ==
- List of Nigerian film producers
- List of Yoruba people
