= Aminatu Abiodun =

- Oloye Iyalode of Ibadan

Ìyálóde of Ibadan
- Reign: 2007 – December 2018
- Coronation: 2007
- Predecessor: Wuraola Akintola
- Successor: Laduntan Oyekanmi
- Born: 24 December 1924
- Died: 8 December 2018 (aged 93); Ibadan

Chief Aminatu Abiodun (1924-2018) was the 13th Iyalode of Ibadan. Often described as the most powerful woman in Ibadan before her death, Abiodun was noted for her influence within the Olubadan-in-Council - the traditional government of the kingdom - and among its market women.

Before assuming the role of Iyalode, she was a businesswoman. Inside Oyo listed her as one of the "biggest five" persons in Oyo State, alongside the Alaafin of Oyo and Lamidi Adedibu, a fellow Ibadan chief.
