= Wesley College, Ibadan =

College in Nigeria

Wesley College of Science
- Elekuro Ibadan, Oyo State; Nigeria

Information
- Type: State government-controlled, Co-educational
- Motto: (Yoruba: Bí ẹni tí ńse ìráńsẹ́) (Learning to Serve)
- Established: 5 November 1905
- Founder: Methodist missionaries
- Principal: Mr A. A Osunbumi 1988 - 1991 Mr A.A Omotoso Nov-Dec 1991 Mr H. A Adeyinka 1992 - 1996 Mr S. O Kusanu 1996- 1997 Mr A. A Omotoso 1997-1999 Mr A. O Ogunmodede 1999- 2004 Mr D. O Ajekigbe(JP) 2004-2005 Mr H. L. T Kolapo 2006-2008 Mr E. O Adepoju 2008- 2010 Mr Oladele I.T 2010-2013 Mrs Okunade J. A 2013-2014 Mr Adeosun I. O 2014- 2016 Mr Adeniji O. J 2016 - 2017 Dn. Adetona D. A 2017- 2018 Mr. Alabi A. T January 2018 Mr. Awodiran P.A 2018 - 2020 Mr Oladokun S. O 2020 - 2024 Mr Isola O. B 2024 - 2025 Mr. Obanisola 2025 -
- Campus type: Full boarding

Wesley College of Science (founded as Wesley College on November 5, 1905) is a government controlled, co-educational, senior secondary school located in Ibadan, Oyo State. The school was previously called "Wesley College", a teacher training institution that churned out the like of famous political, elder statesman of repute, and the First Western Premier in the First Republic, Chief Obafemi Awolowo. Currently known as Wesley College of Science, it educates senior secondary school science students in preparation for Senior School Certificate Examinations. According to Naij.com, it is the 6th oldest secondary school in Nigeria.
