= Oru-Ijebu =

- Town
- Country: Nigeria
- State: Ogun
- LGA: Ijebu North

Government
  - Type: Democratic
  - Oloru: Oba Abdulrasaq Olufemi Adebanjo

Population (2006 Census)
  - Total: 27,000
- Time zone: UTC+1 (WAT)

Oru-Ijebu is a semi-urban town located in Ijebu North local government area of Ogun State, South-Western Nigeria. It is bordered by Ago-Iwoye in Ogun State and shares close territorial boundaries with Ijebu Igbo, the headquarters of Ijebu North, Ogun state. The town is alternatively known as Ijebu-Oru and according to the 2006 census has a population of about 27,000 people. The traditional ruler and community leader of the town is called the Oloru of Oru-Ijebu and he is Oba Abdulrasaq Olufemi Adebanjo. The town houses a refugee camp which is located on the outskirts 500 m (0.50 km; 1,600 ft; 0.31 mi) away from the town, housing refugees from Liberia and Sierra-Leone. Oru town is rich in various types of precious stones and metals.

== Notable people ==
- Cornelius Taiwo
- Dele Odule
- Olatokunbo Talabi
- Chief Jonathan Adebayo Odupitan
- Prof Oluwole Sikiru Banjo
