= Alapata Apata =

2011 satirical play by Wole Soyinka

- Author: Wole Soyinka
- Language: English
- Genre: Fiction
- Publisher: Bookcraft Ltd
- Publication date: 1 August 2011
- Publication place: Nigeria
- ISBN: 9-788-13595-1

Alapata Apata is a satirical play by Nobel laureate Wole Soyinka. The play mocks Nigerian politics from the eyes and lifestyle of retired butcher, Alaba.

== Themes ==
Among the themes present in the play are the relationship between humans and the environment, particularly environmental justice, environmental discourse, and ecological literacy.
