= Sunday Omobolanle =

Film actor

- Born: 10 October 1954; Oyo State, Nigeria
- Other name: Aluwe
- Occupations: comic actor; filmmaker; producer; director; witter
- Notable work: Adun Ewuro
- Spouse: Peju Ogunmola
- Relatives: Sunkanmi Omobolanle (son)
- Awards: MON

Sunday Omobolanle, aka Papi Luwe //, MON (born January 10, 1954) is a Nigerian comic actor, playwright, film director, and producer.

== Early life and career ==
He was born on January 10, 1954, at Ilora, a town in Oyo State southwestern Nigeria. He is the father of Sunkanmi Omobolanle, a Nigerian film actor and director. Sunday Omobolanle scripted, directed, produced, and featured in several Nigerian films, such as Adun Ewuro, a 2011 Nigerian film that featured Adebayo Salami. In recognition of his contributions to the Nigerian film industry, he was bestowed with a National Award, MON by Olusegun Obasanjo, the former president of the Federal Republic of Nigeria.

== Filmography ==
- Love of My Life (2002)
- Green Snake (2003) as Udenwa
- Olorire (2003) as Oluso
- Perosoko (2003) as Chief
- Lanleyin (2004)
- Eewo orun (2005)
- Adun Ewuro (2006)
- Asoko peye (2008)
- Adun Ewuro (2011)
- Konkobilo
- Oba Alatise
- Head Gone (2014)
- Survival of Jelili (2019) as Papi Luwe
- Anikulapo (2022) as Oyo Chief
