= Peter Fatomilola =

Nigerian dramatist, film actor, poet and playwright (born 1946)

- Born: 16 January 1946 (age 80); Ifisin-Ekiti, Southern Region, British Nigeria (now in Ekiti State, Nigeria)
- Other name: Papa Ajasco
- Citizenship: Nigeria
- Education: Obafemi Awolowo University
- Occupations: Playwright; Poet; Nollywood actor
- Known for: Sango
- Parents: Abraham Ojo Fatomilola (father); Elizabeth Fatomilola (mother)

Chief Peter Fatomilola (born 16 January 1946) is a Nigerian dramatist, film actor, poet, Ifá priest and prolific playwright.

== Early life ==
Fatomilola was born on 16 January 1946 in the town of Ifisin-Ekiti in Ido-Osi Local Government area of Ekiti State, Nigeria, to Chief Abraham Ojo Fatomilola and Mrs. Elizabeth Fatomilola. He is a son of Chief Ifa Priest, known as the Oluwo (Olu-awo, meaning Lord of the oracle), which was believed to have influenced his herbalist role in Nigerian film. His mother was from the town of Isare-Opin in EKITI LGA of Kwara State. In 1967, he joined the Olokun Theatre group under the tutelage of the late Professor Ola Rotimi, a renowned dramatist and prolific playwright at the University of Ife, now Obafemi Awolowo University. He is also a member of the academic staff of Obafemi Awolowo University, where he obtained a Bachelor of Arts degree in Theatre Arts in 1978. He was the first Papa Ajasco, a lead role in a comedy film produced by Wale Adenuga. He had featured in several notable Nigerian films such as Sango, an epic African film produced by Obafemi Lasode and scripted by Wale Ogunyemi in 1997. He has acted the role of the priest in several Yoruba films.

== Filmography ==
- Papa Ajasco
- Orisa Aiye (2024) as Oluwo
- Keji (2023) as Baba Falola
- Igbale (2023) as Baba Amoye
- Strangers (2022) as Grandpa
- Love Castle (2021) as Eleemo
- Rise of the Saints (2020) as Orula
- Kakanfo (2020) as Ologbonsanwo
- Gold Statue (2019) as Grandpa Esho
- King Invincible (2017) as Adeyer
- Ebute (2010) as Awogbemi
- Apaadi (2009)
- Irapada (2006) as Soothsayer
- Afonja (2002) as Afonja
- Saworoide (1999)
- Brass Bells (1999) as Amawomaro
- Sango (1997) as Babalawo Oyo
- Koseegbe (1995) as Police Chief
- May 29 (film) (2020) as Baba Ifa

== Personal life ==
He is married with several wives, including one who sells local concoctions and herbs (Iya Fat) at a market at the Obafemi Awolowo University. He has 11 children. In addition, he has several chieftaincy titles around Yorubaland, including Oluwo (Chief Ifa Priest) in his hometown of Ifisin-Ekiti and Amuludun in Ile-Ife.
