= Western Nigeria Television =

NTA Ibadan
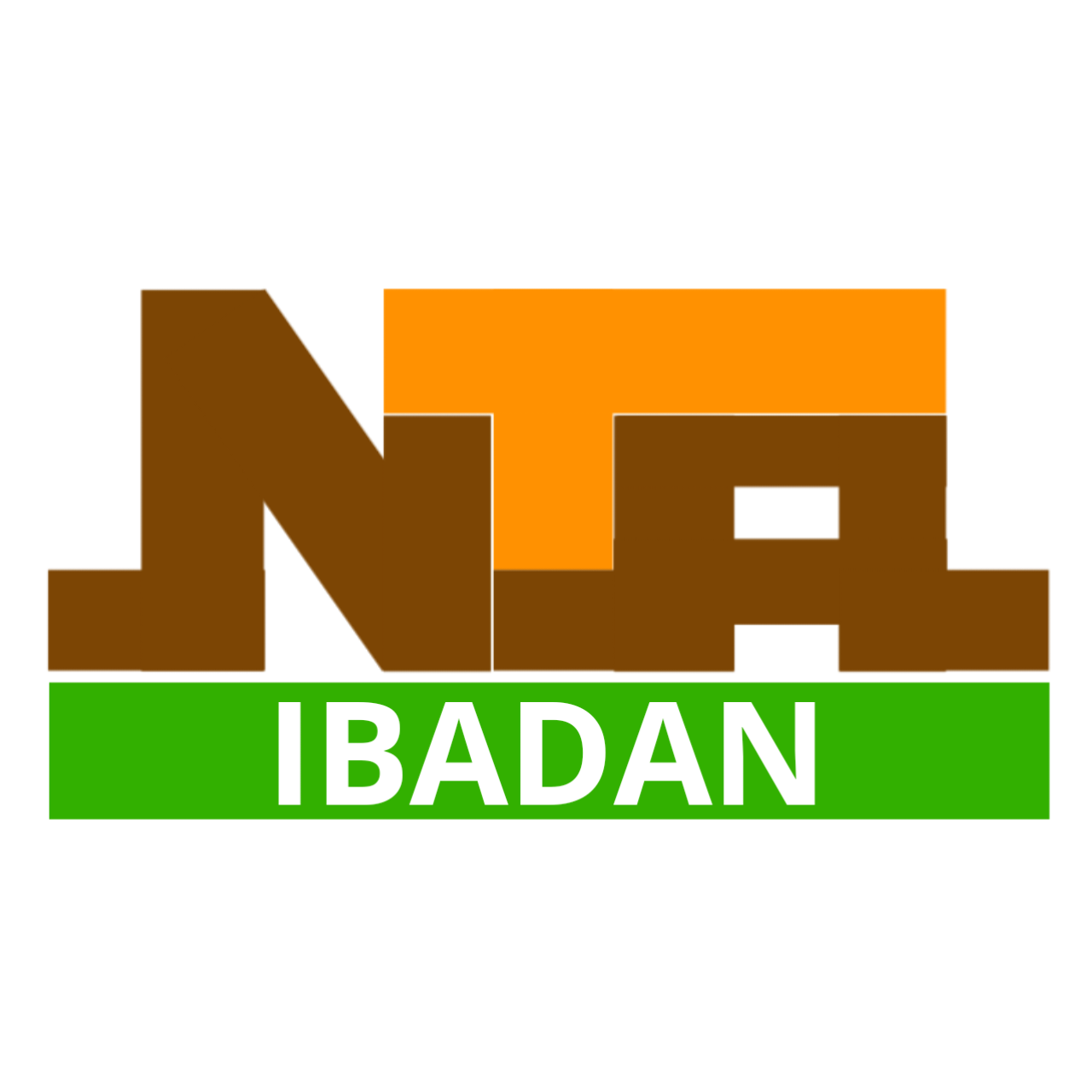
- Country: Nigeria
- Broadcast area: Oyo State
- Headquarters: Ibadan, Nigeria

Programming
- Languages: English, Yoruba

Ownership
- Owner: Nigerian Television Authority

History
- Launched: 31 October 1959
- Former names: Western Nigeria Television (1959-1977)

Availability

Terrestrial
- VHF: Channel 7 (Ibadan)

NTA Ibadan, formerly Western Nigeria Television also known as WNTV is the first television service station launched in Nigeria, and is a unit of the Nigerian Television Authority since 1977. The station played a significant role in beaming taped Yoruba traveling theatre productions to households.

In 1975, the Federal Government of Nigeria established Nigerian Television Authority network service and acquired all T.V. stations in Nigeria to form the network. WNTS then became NTA Ibadan.

== History ==
=== WNBS/WNTV ===
WNTS was created as a partnership between the Western regional government and a foreign firm. It was designed to be an educational tool for the masses and also a medium to beam local culture, foreign news and aims of the government to the homes of people in the region. Establishment of the station was enhanced by a constitutional change that removed broadcasting from an exclusive item to a concurrent item and political resolution of the regional premier, Obafemi Awolowo and the regional minister of Information, Anthony Enahoro. WNTV was a partnership between Overseas Rediffusion and the Western regional government.

The first television broadcast was on October 31, 1959 from two transmitters, one in Ibadan and one in Abafon, where its headquarters were located. At the time of launch, the station used "First in Africa" as its slogan, denoting its status, though it wasn't first television station launched in the continent, former TV station TELMA in Morocco was on the air for a year from 1954 to 1955. Likewise the former French public broadcaster RTF also launched a television service in Algeria in 1956.

From May 1960, WNTV started airing commercial advertising in an attempt to deviate from the government to obtain funds. The regional government subsidized WNTV in order to meet its expenditures. In 1962, the government parted ways with its foreign partner, WNTV solely came under the control of the regional government. The change in ownership structure from a mixture of social and commercial interest to solely social and political interest made WNTV an organ of government information and tool of the party in power. News programs such as WNTV News, Highlight were the ratings powerhouse of the station. Between 1959 and 1964, imported dramas dominated programming and reruns of children shows such as Adventures of Robin Hood, Cisco Kid, Hop Along Cassidy were popular among children.

Beginning in 1962, the station increased audience through outreach programs in rural areas and schools starting with Omi-Adio Lalupon TV viewing project where TV sets powered by generators were purchased for joint viewing at rural community centers. The station had two educative programs that were well received News and You, a current affairs discussion program produced by Christopher Kolade and the Ministry of Education and Careers, a show that featured people in their various occupations. During this period there was little measurable statistics but the station played a pivotal role of promoting Yoruba traveling theatre. It taped and beamed Duro Ladipo's plays including Ọba kò so for television viewing and a popular series Bode Waasimi. In the 1970s, it broadcast popular shows like Alawada by the Alawada Group that included Moses Olaiya also known as Baba Sala. In 1976, Kootu Asipa by Oyin Adejobi was a popular drama.

=== NTA Ibadan ===
The creation of new states in 1976, coupled by the takeover of the station by the government, led to an improvement of its transmitter network, with five powerful transmitters (Ibadan, Abefon, Idominasi, Iju, and Asileke) carrying the signal. It was part of NTA's Zone A in the southwest of the country, being its main station. By the early 80s, NTA Ibadan's schedule was 75% local, the rest being foreign imports and other network programmes.

One of its most iconic programmes in the 1970s and 1980s was the game show Ẹ n ba laya (You Are Being Challenged), presented by Yemi Ogunyemi and aired in the southwestern states.
