= Foluke Daramola =

Nigerian actress (born 1978)

- Born: Foluke Daramola; 15 February 1978 (age 48)
- Education: Obafemi Awolowo University
- Occupation: Actress
- Years active: 1998-present
- Spouse: Kayode Salako
- Children: 2

Foluke Daramola-Salako is a Nigerian actress. She was nominated for Africa Movie Academy Award for Best Actress in a Supporting Role in 2013. She is a Nigerian Yoruba actress and film producer.

== Early life and career ==
Daramola was born on 15 February 1978. She is a graduate of Obafemi Awolowo University. In 1998, she made her film debut in a series titled Palace. She also starred in Durodola and Above Law. In 2016, her daughter was reported to be the host of a reality television show. Her film, Cobweb, which she produced and starred in got her Africa Movie Academy Awards best-supporting-actress nomination. She noted that the film was inspired by her personal experiences, as her parents didn't want her to delve into acting while in school. She is the founder of the "Action Against Rape in Africa" initiative, which is a movement that seeks to curb rape and bring its perpetrators to book in Africa.

== Personal life ==
In a 2016 interview, she revealed that she was raped while she was a teenager. In an interview with Tribune, she explained that women need to know their value and be financially dependent on their husband. She posited that domestic violence is a greater wreck to her home, than infidelity. In 2017, she publicly spoke on the modesty of Aliko Dangote, describing him as "the most humble person on earth".

In March 2018 interview with The Punch, Daramola-Salako stated that she consider her big boobs to be an asset not a curse: “The first attraction for most men who come across me is usually sexual. They see my big boobs and are moved immediately. But as a person, I would never go out with any man because they are attracted to my boobs because I know that it is too ordinary. As far as I’m concerned, women should stop seeing these ‘assets’ as a problem but take them as a blessing. It is only by so doing that they’ll know how to carry themselves better. They should carry themselves well and not be ashamed."

== See also ==
- List of Yoruba people
- List of Nigerian actresses
