= Ayọ Ni Mọ Fẹ =

1994 film by Tunde Kelani

- Directed by: Tunde Kelani
- Written by: Bola Anike Obot
- Starring: Yomi Ogunmola; Bola Obot; Yinka Oyedijo); Lere Paimo; Kareem Adepoju
- Production company: Mainframe Films and Television Productions
- Release date: 1994 (Nigeria)
- Running time: 100 minutes
- Country: Nigeria
- Language: Yoruba

Ayọ Ni Mọ Fẹ is a Nollywood Yoruba drama film sequel that was directed by Tunde Kelani and released in 1994 through Mainframe Films and Television Productions.

== Cast ==
- Yomi Ogunmola as Ayọ
- Bola Obot as Jumoke
- Yinka Oyedijo as Adunni
- Kareem Adepoju as Chief Adeleke
- Lere Paimo
