= The Narrow Path (2006 film) =

2006 film by Tunde Kelani

- Directed by: Tunde Kelani
- Written by: Tunde Kelani; Niji Akanni
- Starring: Sola Asedeko; Ayo Badmus; Khabirat Kafidipe
- Cinematography: Lukaan Abdulrahman; Tunde Kelani
- Edited by: Mumin Wale Kelani; Frank Efe Patrick
- Music by: Beautiful Nubia; Seun Owoaje
- Production companies: Mainframe Film and Television Productions
- Distributed by: Mainframe Film and Television Productions
- Release date: 2006
- Running time: 95 minutes
- Country: Nigeria
- Languages: English and Yoruba

The Narrow Path is a 2006 Nigerian film, produced and directed by Tunde Kelani. The film was adapted from The Virgin, a novel written by Bayo Adebowale.

== Plot summary ==
The film follows the story of Awero, a young woman living in the village of Orita South-West Nigeria during the colonial era. Awero was a beautiful virgin whom all the men in the village wanted to marry. She was involved in a love triangle-esque relationship between Odejimi a brave hunter and Lapade a rich jewellery merchant. She later accepted to marry Odejimi a brave hunter from another village but was raped by Dauda her childhood friend before her traditional ceremony.

However, a dark secret is revealed on their wedding night, causing a rift between the villages of Orita and Agbade and bringing them on the brink of war.

In the end, the conflict is resolved by a group of village women, led by Awero, who advocate for the cancellation of virginity tests in all the villages. The film features the beautiful Yoruba country's rich art and culture. It includes a soundtrack called Ikoko Akufo (Lamentations for a broken pot) by Beautiful Nubia that was later included in his Essential Work Album.

== Cast ==
- Sola Asedeko as Awero
- Segun Adefila as Dauda
- Ayo Badmus as Lapade
- Seyi Fasuyi as Odejimi
- Khabirat Kafidipe as Peju
- Keji Yusuf as Iya Peju
- Joke Muyiwa as Awero's Mother
- Olu Okekanye as Awero's Father
- Eniola Olaniyan as Bogunde
- Funke Akindele as Wunmi
- Laide Adewale as Korede
- Alaba Adeshina as Alape
- Deji Aderemi as Omitade
- Remi Abiola as Iya Lape
- Noelie Agbandegba as Adedara
- Bukky Wright as Abigail
- Idowu Philips as Odejimi's Mother
