= Oyin Adejobi =

Nigerian dramatist and actor (1926–2000)

- Born: 1926; Nigeria
- Died: 2000 (aged 73–74)
- Citizenship: Nigerian
- Occupations: Actor; Dramatist
- Known for: Orogun Adedigba
- Spouse: Grace Oyin-Adejobi

Chief Oyin Adejobi (1926–2000) was a Nigerian dramatist and actor. His name, Oyin, means "Honey".

== Biography ==
He wrote and performed in a variety of Yoruba productions on the stage, on television, and in movies. He was married to actress Grace Oyin-Adejobi until his death.

He was especially well known for his autobiographical movie Orogun Adedigba. He also had a weekly television show, Kootu Asipa "Ashipa Court" on Nigerian Television Authority, Ibadan. The 'Oyin Adejobi Popular Theatre Company' is named after him.

== Filmography ==
- Alakada (2009) as Iya Tunji
- Ogun adubi (2003)
- Akoni Mefa (2003)
- Omo inu oku (2001)
- Ti oluwa ni ile (1993)
- Iya Olobi
- Orogun Adedigba
- Ile Iwosan
- Kootu Asipa (Ashipa's Court)
- Iyekan Soja
- Ekuro Oloja
- Kuye

== Notes ==
- Barber, Karin and Ogundijo, Bayo (eds.). Yoruba Popular Theatre: Three Plays by the Oyin Adejobi Company, African Studies Association, 1995. ISBN 0-918456-70-3
- Barber, Karin. The Generation of Plays: Yoruba Popular Life in Theater, Indiana University Press, 2003. ISBN 0-253-21617-6
- Bodunrin, Hammed. "My 42 years onstage," Daily Sun, June 3, 2005
- Jeyifo, Biodun. The Yoruba popular travelling theatre of Nigeria, Lagos, Nigeria: Department of Culture, Federal Ministry of Social Development, Youth, Sports & Culture, 1984. ASIN B0006EK66S
