= Sola Asedeko =

Nigerian actor

- Born: Lagos State, Nigeria
- Citizenship: Nigerian
- Occupations: actress; director; filmmaker
- Years active: 2006 - present
- Known for: Abeni; The Narrow Path

Sola Asedeko is a Nigerian film actress, film-maker and director. She is popularly known as Abeni for her lead role in Abeni, a 2006 Nigerian film, produced and directed by Tunde Kelani.

== Early life ==
Asedeko was born in Lagos State, southwestern Nigeria. She attended Sonmori Comprehensive High School (SONCOHS) at Ifako Ijaiye where she obtained the West Africa School Certificate before she proceeded to the University of Lagos where she received a bachelor's degree in theatre art and later obtained a master's degree in public administration.

== Career ==
She began acting in 2006, the same year she played a lead role in Abeni (film), a film produced and directed by Tunde Kelani. The film made her a household name and became a choice of Tunde Kelani in his award-winning film titled The Narrow Path, where she also played the lead role of a village young girl who must choose between two suitors. She has featured in several Nigerian films and soap operas.

== Filmography ==
- Dangerous Twins (2004)
- Abeni (2006) as Abeni
- The Narrow Path (2006) as Awero
- Afesona (2007) as Funmilola
- Jenifa (2008) as Tutu
- Omo Ghetto (2010) as Kanyinsola
