= Kareem Adepoju =

Nigerian film actor, writer and producer

- Born: Alhaji Kareem Adepoju; Osogbo
- Other name: Baba Wande
- Citizenship: Nigerian
- Occupations: Actor; film producer; writer
- Years active: 1962–present
- Known for: Arugba, Abeni, Igbekun, Anikulapo, Ti Oluwa Ni Ile

Alhaji Kareem Adepoju popularly known as "Baba Wande" is a Nigerian film actor, writer, and producer who shot to the limelight in 1993 after he starred as "Oloye Otun" in the movie titled Ti Oluwa Ni Ile.

== Selected filmography ==
- Oluweri Magboojo
- Ti Oluwa Ni Ile (1993)
- Ayọ Ni Mọ Fẹ (1994) as Chief Adeleke
- Abeni (2006) as Baba Wande
- Arugba (2008) as Aigoro
- Igbekun
- Òbúko Dúdú
- Ika lomo ejo
- Enu Eye (2010)
- Anikulapo (2022) as Ojumo Chief
- Osa meji

== See also ==
- List of Nigerian film producers
