= Akinwunmi Isola =

Nigerian playwright and actor (1939–2018)

Akinwumi Isola
- Born: December 24, 1939; Ibadan, Nigeria
- Died: February 17, 2018 (aged 78); Ibadan, Nigeria
- Education: University of Ibadan
- Occupations: Playwright; novelist; actor; scholar
- Known for: Writing in and promoting the Yoruba language
- Awards: National Merit Award; Fellow of the Nigerian Academy of Letters

Akinwumi Isola (24 December 1939 – 17 February 2018) was a Yoruba playwright, novelist, actor, dramatist, culture activist and scholar. He was known for his writing in, and his work in promoting, the Yoruba language. As an actor, he was known for;

- Agogo Eèwò (2002) as Ifa Priest
- Sawo-Segberi (2005)
- The Campus Queen (2004) as Professor
- Thunderbolt: Magun (2001) as Professor
- Brass Bells (1999) as Babalawo
- Efunsetan Aniwura (1981)
- Efunsetan Aniwura (2005).

== Early life and career ==
Isola was born in Ibadan in 1939. He attended Labode Methodist School and Wesley College. He then studied at the University of Ibadan, earning a B.A. in French.

He was appointed professor at Obafemi Awolowo University in 1991. Isola wrote his first play, Efunsetan Aniwura, during 1961-62 while still a student at the University of Ibadan. This was followed by a novel, O Le Ku. In 1986, he wrote and composed the college anthem that is currently sung in Wesley College Ibadan.

He went on to write a number of plays and novels. He broke into broadcasting, creating a production company that has turned a number of his plays into television dramas and films. Though he claimed, "my target audience are Yorubas", Isola also wrote in English and translated to Yoruba. He spent his lifetime producing works that promoted the Yoruba language.

On May 4, 2015, his book Herbert Macaulay and the Spirit of Lagos was staged at the Performing Arts Theatre of the University of Ilorin in Kwara State. It was directed by Adams Abdulfatai Ayomide for the annual season of plays festival.

In 2000, in recognition of his immense contributions, he was awarded the National Merit Award and appointed a Fellow of the Nigerian Academy of Letters. He was also a visiting professor at the University of Georgia.

== Personal life ==
Isola was married and had four children. He died on 17 February 2018 in Ibadan, Oyo State, aged 78.

== Links ==
- Interview from The Sun newspaper
- Profile
