= Tunde Kelani =

Nigerian filmmaker (born 1948)

- Born: 26 February 1948 (age 78); Lagos, British Nigeria
- Education: London Film School
- Occupation: Filmmaker
- Known for: Owner of Mainframe Films and Television Productions
- Website: mainframemovies.tv

Tunde Kelani (born February 26, 1946), popularly known as TK, is a Nigerian filmmaker. In a career spanning more than four decades, TK specialises in producing movies that promote Nigeria's cultural heritage, particularly that of the Yoruba. He is also known for his screen adaptations of Nigerian novels and plays. These include Koseegbe, O le ku, Thunder Bolt: Magun, The Narrow Path, White Handkerchief, Maami and Dazzling Mirage.

== Early life ==
Tunde Kelani was born in Lagos. At the age of five, he was sent to live with his grandparents at Abeokuta in Ogun State. He attended the Oke-Ona Primary School in Ikija, Abeokuta, and Abeokuta Grammar School for his secondary education. His grandfather was a chief, the Balogun of Ijaiye Kukudi, one who provided the young Kelani a deep exposure to Yoruba literature, religion, philosophy and arts.

He was especially influenced by Yoruba theatre and in secondary school saw many Yoruba classics, including The Palm-Wine Drinkard, Oba Koso, Kurunmi, and works by the playwright Herbert Ogunde.

From his early student days he was also interested in photography and became an apprentice photographer after completing secondary school. He then trained at Western Nigeria Television (WNTV) before attending the London Film School.

== Early career ==
In the 1970s, Kelani worked as a BBC TV and Reuters correspondent and in Nigerian TV. His assignments for Reuters included travelling to Ethiopia to cover the drought and to Zimbabwe to report on its independence. Once he completed his studies at London Film School, he returned to Nigeria and co-produced his first film with Adebayo Faleti, The Dilemma of Rev. Father Michael (Idaamu Paadi Minkailu), with a screenplay by Lola Fani-Kayode. Other co-producers included Alhaji Lasisi Oriekun, Wale Fanubi, his partner from Cinekraft, and Yemi Farounbi.

Kelani has also worked on numerous Nigieran films as a cinematographer. Some of these 16mm features include: Anikura; Ogun Ajaye; Iya Ni Wura; Taxi Driver; Iwa and Fopomoyo. In 1990, Kelani was an assistant director and an actor in the 1990 film Mister Johnson, the first American film shot on location in Nigeria. Starring Pierce Brosnan and Maynard Eziashi, the film was based on a 1939 novel by Joyce Cary.

== Literary adaptations ==
Kelani was an avid reader from a young age and particularly drawn to authors such as D. O. Fagunwa who centered their writings on their Yorùbá heritage. Once he discovered the relationship between literature and filmmaking, he decided to prioritize adapting literary works to the screen. His favourite writers include Kola Akinlade, Pa Amos Tutuola, Cyprian Ekwensi, Akinwunmi Ishola, Adebayo Faleti, Wale Ogunyemi and Wole Soyinka.

Some of Kelani's most successful films are Nigerian literary adaptations such as: Koseegbe (1995) Oleku (1997), Thunderbolt: Magun, The White Handkerchief (1998), The Narrow Path (2006), Maami (2011) and Dazzling Mirage (2014).

== Production company ==
In 1991, Kelani established his production company, Mainframe Films and Television Productions with a focus on adapting Nigerian novels and plays to the big screen.

Under the Mainframe banner, Kelani directed his first film Ti Oluwa Nile (1993), which remains one of Yoruba's best selling films. Other Mainframe productions directed by Kelani followed, including Ayo Ni Mo Fe (1994), Koseegbe (1995) Oleku (1997), Thunderbolt: Magun, Saworoide (1999) Agogo Eewo(2002), The Campus Queen (2004), Abeni (2006)The Narrow Path (2006), Arugba (2008), Maami (2011), and Dazzling Mirage (2014), an adaptation of an Olayinka Egbokhare novel about a sickle-cell sufferer who overcomes social stigma, prejudice, and low self-esteem to achieve success, marriage, and motherhood. Kelani aimed to bring awareness to sickle-cell and help people make better informed decisions.

== Filmography ==
Year	Film	Role	Notes
1982	Orun Mooru	as a cinematographer	
1993	Ti Oluwa Nile 1		
1993	Ti Oluwa Nile 2	Director	starring; Grace Oyin Adejobi, Kareem Adepoju, Dele Odule
1993	Ti Oluwa Nile 3		
1994	Ayo Ni Mofe	Director	starring: Bola Obot, Yomi Ogunmola, Yinka Oyedepo
1994	Ayo Ni Mofe 2		
1995	Koseegbe	Director	starring: Toyin Adegbola, Laide Adewale, Master Ajuwon
1997	O Le Ku	Director	starring: Tunde Adegbola, Deji Adenuga, Laide Adewale
1999	Saworoide		
2000	The White Handkerchief	Director/Producer	starring: Yinka Akanbi, Kemi Akanni, Yemi Akomolafe
2001	Thunderbolt: Magun	Director/Producer	starring: Uche Ama Abriel, Bose Aderibigbe, Bukky Ajayi
2002	Agogo Eewo	Director/Producer	starring: Gbenga Adebayo, Aderemi Adedeji, Tunde Adegbola
2004	The Campus Queen	Director	starring: Henry Abba, Segun Adefila
2006	Abeni	Director/Producer	starring: Kareem Adepoju
2006	The Narrow Path	Director/Producer	starring: Segun Adefila
2008	Life in Slow Motion	Director/Producer	
2010	Arugba	Director/Producer	starring: Segun Adefila
2011	Maami	Director/Producer	
2015	Dazzling Mirage	Director/Producer	
2017	Sis Ilujinle	Director	starring Lanre Hassan, Aishat Onitiri
2021	Ayinla	Director	starring: Lateef Adedimeji, Bimbo Ademoye
2021	Cordelia	Director	starring: Femi Adebayo, Bukunmi Adeola, Jumoke Ajadi
2024	Ebrohimie Road: A Museum of Memory	Cinematographer	Starring: Wole Soyinka, Olayide Soyinka, Femi Euba, Nelson Fashina, Folabo Ajayi-Soyinka, Olaokun Soyinka

== See also ==
- List of Nigerian film producers
- Mainframe Film and Media Institute
