= Akin (given name) =

Akín
- Gender: Male
- Language: Yoruba

Origin
- Origin: Nigerian
- Meaning: The brave one, warrior.
- Region of origin: South West, Nigeria

Akín is a popular Nigerian male given name and surname of Yoruba origin. It means "The brave one, warrior, valor, valiant one, the hero.". The name Akín is distinctive, carrying a strong and meaningful undertone. The name Akín is common among the Ife and Ijesha people of the Southwest, Nigeria. Other full forms of the name include Akinadé, Akinfẹ́mi, Akinfẹ́la, Akinkiawe, Akinkúòlíẹ̀, Akinwunmi, Akinsegun, Akínnúyì etc.

== Notable individuals with the name ==
- Akin Abayomi, Nigerian politician and professor.
- Akin Adesokan, Nigerian writer
- Akin Akingbala (born 1983), Nigerian basketball player
- Akin Akinsehinde (born 1976), Nigerian footballer
- Akin Alabi, Nigerian music video director, writer, and entrepreneur
- Akin Ayodele (born 1979), American football player
- Akin Düzakin (born 1961), Turkish-Norwegian illustrator and children's author
- Akin Ersoy (born 1945), Turkish sports shooter
- Akin Euba (1935–2020), Nigerian composer, musicologist, and pianist
- Akin Fakeye (born 1936), Nigerian craftsman
- Akin Famewo (born 1998), English footballer
- Akin Fayomi (born 1955), Nigerian diplomat
- Akin Lewis (born 1957), Nigerian actor, director, and producer
- Akin Mabogunje (1931–2022), Nigerian geographer
- Akin Odebunmi (born 1967), Nigerian professor
- Akin Odimayo (born 1999), English footballer
- Akin Babalola Kamar Odunsi, Nigerian businessman
- Akin Ogungbe (1934–2012), Nigerian filmmaker and actor
- Akin Omoboriowo (1932–2012), Nigerian lawyer and politician
- Akin Omotoso (born 1974), Nigerian film director, writer, and actor
- Akin Osuntokun (born 1961), Nigerian political scientist
- Akin "Ak" Reyes (born 1979), American sports broadcaster
