= Akinfenwa =

Akínfẹ́nwá
- Gender: Male
- Language: Yoruba

Origin
- Origin: Yorubaland
- Meaning: Valor loved me enough to come (to me).
- Region of origin: Yorubaland [Nigeria, Benin, Togo]

Akínfẹ́nwá is a Yoruba surname typically bestowed upon males. It means "Valor loved me enough to come (to me)." The name Akínfẹ́nwá is distinctive, carrying a strong and meaningful undertone. The diminutive form is Akin which means "The brave one, warrior, valor, valiant one, the hero".

== Notable individuals with the name ==
- Adebayo Akinfenwa (born 1982), English footballer.
- Joseph Akinfenwa (born 1956), Anglican bishop in Nigeria.
- Moji Akinfenwa (1930–2019), Nigerian politician.
