= Akinremi =

Akínrẹ̀mí
- Gender: Male
- Language: Yoruba

Origin
- Origin: Yorubaland
- Meaning: Valor consoles me.
- Region of origin: Yorubaland [Nigeria, Benin, Togo]

Akínrẹ̀mí is a Yoruba name and surname typically given to males. It translates to “Valor consoles me." The name Akínrẹ̀mí signifies cultural values and often carries meanings related to ancestry and familial heritage. The diminutive forms include Akin and/or Remi which means (Consoles me).

== Notable individuals with the name ==
- Olaide Adewale Akinremi (1972 - 2024), Nigerian politician.
- Omolade Akinremi (born 1974), Nigerian hurdler.
- Omotayo Akinremi (born 1974), Nigerian sprinter and hurdler.
