= Chukwuemeka Ike =

Nigerian monarch and writer (1931–2020)

Ikelionwu XI
- Reign: 18 October 2008 – 20 January 2020
- Coronation: 18 October 2008
- Predecessor: Clement Ike
- Born: Vincent Chukwuemeka Ike; 28 April 1931; Ndikelionwu, Anambra state, Nigeria
- Died: 9 January 2020 (aged 88); Nnamdi Azikwe Teaching Hospital, Nnewi, Anambra State, Nigeria
- Consort: Adebimpe Oluri Minsola Abimbolu
- Issue: Prince Ositadimma Ike
- Family: Ijoma
- Dynasty: Ikelionwu
- Father: Eze Charles Ike
- Mother: Dinah Ike
- Religion: Christianity
- Occupation: Writer
- Writing career
- Education: Government College Umuahia
- Alma mater: University of Ibadan (BA); Stanford University (MA)
- Genre: Literary fiction
- Notable works: The Potter's Wheel, Toads for Supper

Vincent Chukwuemeka Ike // OFR, NNOM (28 April 1931 – 9 January 2020) was a Nigerian monarch, academic and writer known for a mixture of lampoon, humour and satire. He owed a little bit of his style to his Igbo cultural upbringing. He studied history, English and Religious Studies at the University of Ibadan and earned a master's degree at Stanford University. Among many of the first generation of Nigerian writers, he was popular as the author of Expo '77, a critical look at academic examination abuses in West Africa. Ike was a former registrar of the West African Examinations Council (WAEC).

== Life and career ==
=== Early life ===
Ike was born into a royal family in Ndikelionwu in Anambra State, located in the southeastern region of Nigeria. He attended Government College Umuahia (in the capital city of Abia State) for secondary education. He started writing at Umuahia for the school magazine, The Umuahian, and he was also influenced by teachers that included Saburi Biobaku, who had honours in English from Cambridge. Some eminent Nigerian writers who attended the school include Chinua Achebe, Christopher Okigbo, and Ken Saro Wiwa. After completing his secondary education, he studied at the University of Ibadan. While at the college, he was invited by Chinua Achebe to join the magazine club. He earned a Bachelor of Arts degree in History, English, and Religious Studies from the University of Ibadan in 1955, and got married in 1959 to Adebimpe Olurinsola Abimbolu. In 1965, he published his first novel, Toads for Supper. He earned a master's degree from Stanford University in 1966. A former registrar of the University of Nigeria, Nsukka. In 1971, became chief executive of West African Examinations Council. In 2008, he became king of Ndikelionwu. His only son Prince Osita Ike died in 2016. He was an Igwe, Eze Ndikelionwu of the Ndikelionwu in eastern Nigeria, with the title "Ikelionwu XI" in his hometown of Ndikelionwu in Anambra State.

=== Career ===
Ike served as a teacher in a primary school at Amichi from 1950 to 1951 and in a secondary school at Nkwerre from 1955 to 1956. Between 1957 and 1960, he worked as an administrative assistant at University College, Ibadan. He joined the University of Nigeria, Nsukka, where he worked as the Deputy Registrar from 1960 to 1963 and Registrar and Secretary to the Council from 1963 to 1971. Ike had served in Biafra as the Provincial Refugee Officer in charge of Umuahia Province from 1968 to 1969 and Headquarters Scout Commander in Nsukka Province from 1970 to 1971. After the Nigerian Civil War, he was appointed Chairman, Planning and Management Committee of the University of Nigeria, Nsukka. He was responsible for reopening and managing the institution as the interim Chief Executive immediately after the war. He served as the Registrar of West African Examination Council from 1971 to 1979 as the first Nigerian Chief Executive of the organization.

He had also worked with Daily Times and University Press plc as a director in both organizations. He retired from public service in 1979 and became a visiting professor of English language and literature at University of Jos from 1983 to 1985. Between 1990 and 1991, he was the pro-chancellor and chairman of council, University of Benin, Benin-City (the capital city of Edo State). He was the president of the Nigerian Book Foundation from 1991 until his death in 2020.

== Bibliography ==
- Toads for Supper (London: Harvill Press, 1965)
- The Naked Gods (London: Harvill Press, 1970), ISBN 0-00-271555-4
- The Potter's Wheel (London: Harvill Press, 1973), ISBN 0-00-271620-8
- Sunset at Dawn (Collins & Harvill Press, 1976). ISBN 0-00-261807-9
- Expo '77 (Fontana, 1980), ISBN 0-00-616063-8
- The Chicken Chasers (Fontana, 1980), ISBN 0-00-615947-8
- The Bottled Leopard (1985), ISBN 978-154-778-2
- Our Children Are Coming (Ibadan: Spectrum Books 1990), ISBN 978-2460-21-4
- Conspiracy of Silence (Longman, 2001)

== Relevant literature ==
- Patrick, Charles Alex. "Stylistic analysis of Nigerian prose: A reading of selected novels of Chukwuemeka Ike". EJOTMAS: Ekpoma Journal of Theatre and Media Arts 8, no. 1–2 (2021): 295–312.
