= University Press plc =

Nigerian book publishing company

- Status: Active
- Traded as: UPL
- Founded: 1949
- Country of origin: Nigeria
- Headquarters location: Ibadan, Oyo, Nigeria
- Key people: Bar. Ogunkeye, Samuel Kolawole
- Publication types: Books, Encyclopedia
- Official website: www.universitypressplc.com

University Press plc (UPPLC) is Nigeria's largest indigenous book publisher. It was founded as the Nigerian branch of the British Oxford University Press in 1949 with the name Oxford University Press (OUP), Nigeria. At incorporation as a public liability company in 1978, the company's name was changed to University Press Limited.

The company has coverage of the country and the West African sub-regions through the location of its area offices, depots, showrooms and a number of representatives in major cities and towns nationwide and also in Accra, Ghana. The company prints, publishes and sells books for education and general reading.

The board of directors is composed of both executive and non-executive directors from a variety of backgrounds.

The company has won several awards such as the Nigerian Book Fair Trust Award of Recognition for sharing the vision of Nigerian Book Fair Trust and supporting the growth of the annual Nigerian Book Fair.

== Locations ==
The Head Office of the company is at Three Crowns Building, Jericho, Ibadan. The main warehouse, which is reputed to be one of the largest in tropical Africa, is also located at Ibadan.

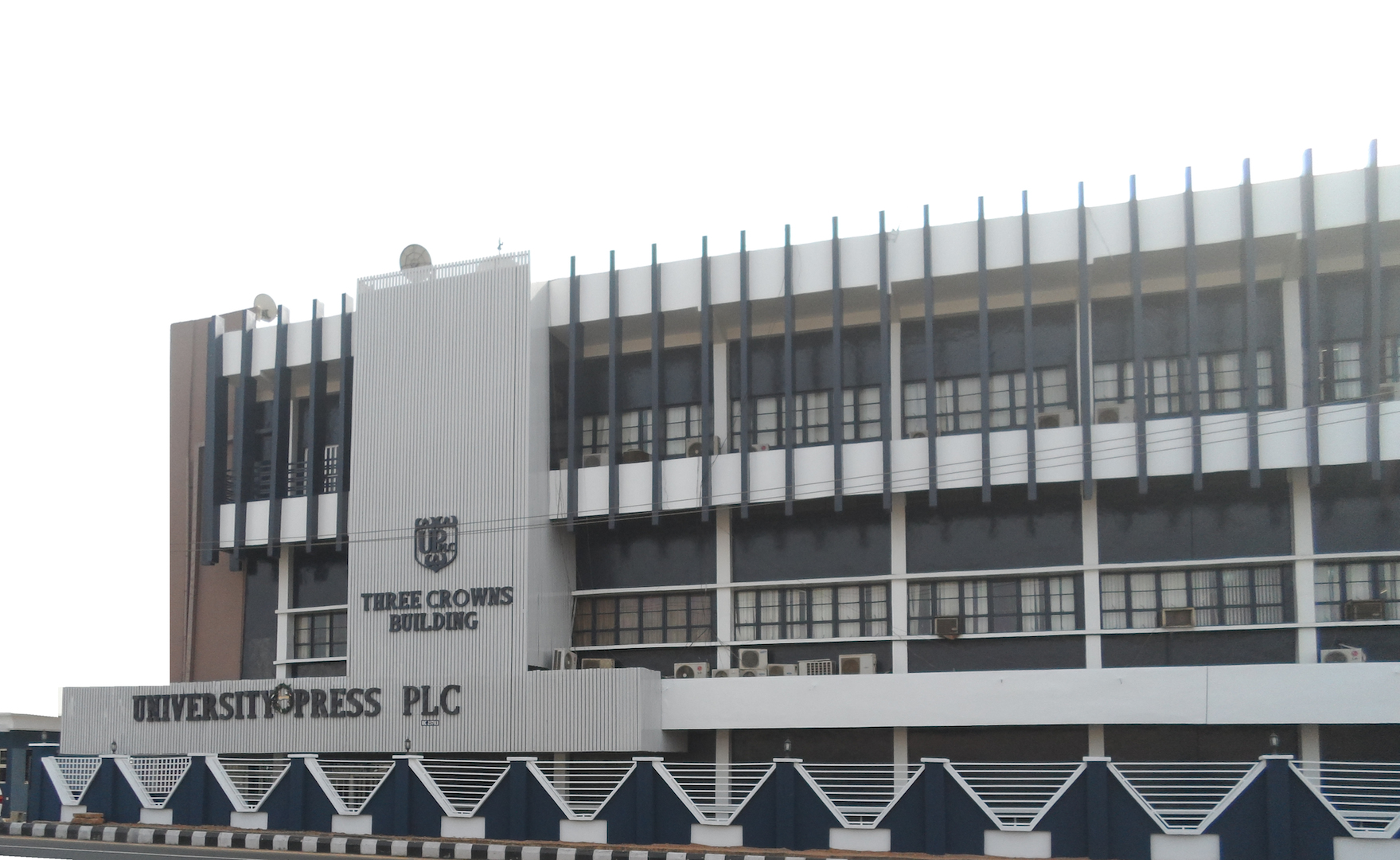
Front view of University Press plc (UPPLC)

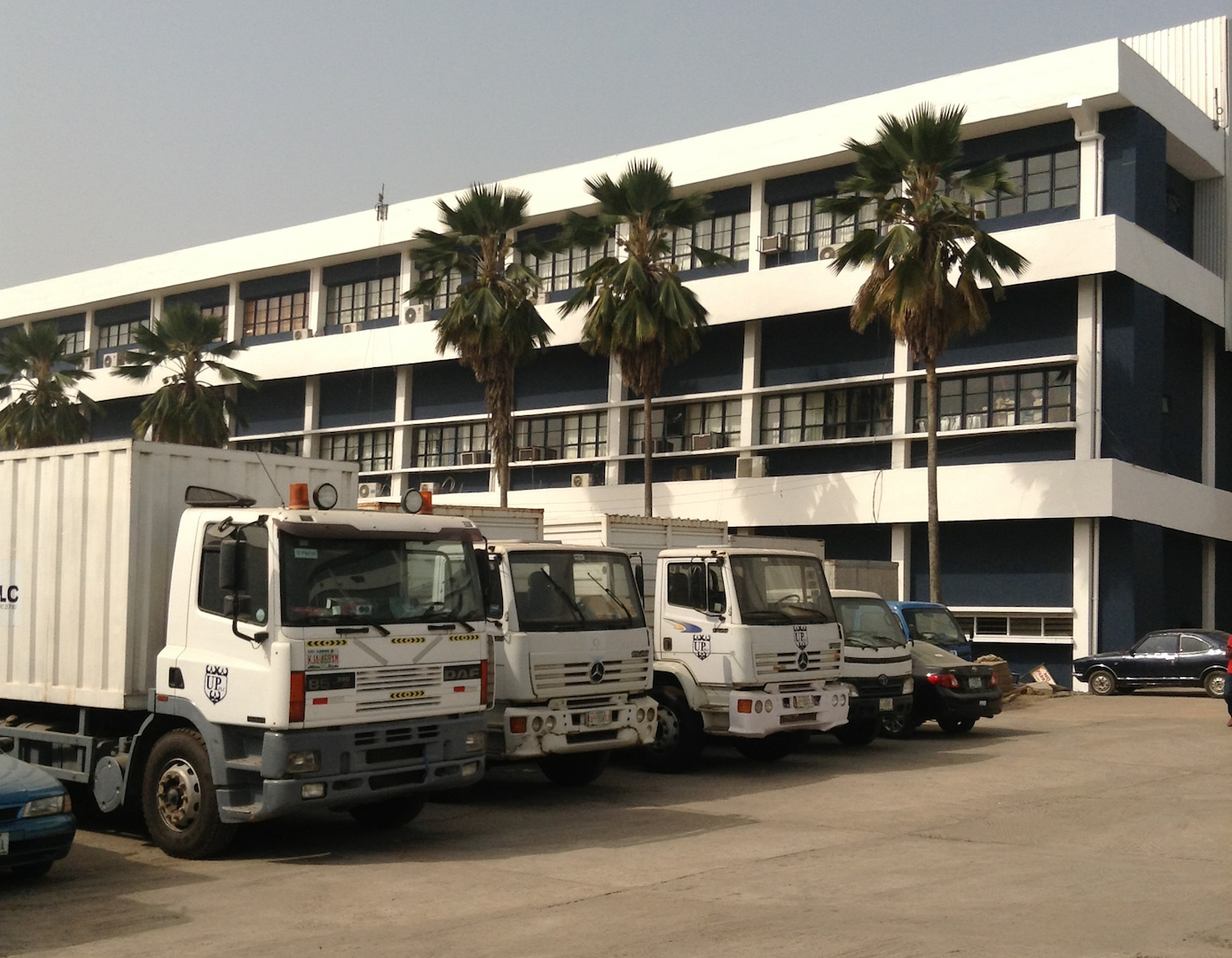
Side view and parking lot

The company has offices, depots, showrooms, and representatives in major cities and towns in Nigeria and also in Accra, Ghana. The depot in Zaria is UPPLC's second largest while the highly commercialized Lagos State has four depots in Ikeja, Ikorodu, Yaba and Ajegunle.

== History ==
Conceptualized in 1949 as the Nigerian branch of Oxford University Press (OUP), its main function was to sell Oxford books in Nigeria. Later, the company began to produce books locally and, before long, a Nigerian unit was established in Oxford where editing and publishing of titles for the Nigerian local markets were done. The titles published were literary and curriculum-based books targeted at educational institutions and the general public. At incorporation as a public liability company in 1978, the company's name was changed to University Press Limited.

University Press plc started indigenizing its titles since 1963, when it came out with the first ever local educational publication in the country, Ijala Are Ode by Oladipo Yemitan.

== Leadership ==
Samuel Kolawole has been managing director since 2005.

== Awards and ratings ==
UPPLC has the undermentioned awards to its credit:

- Pearl Sectoral Leadership Award — In 2025 2008, 2007 and 2006, the company won the aforementioned award in the printing and publishing sector of the Nigerian Stock Market.
- West Africa Institute of Direct Marketing Award – The company was given this award as the West African Best Books and Educational Materials Producers of the year.
- The World Bank Best Overall Performance Award (African Region) – The company won this in 2005, 2006, 2007 and 2008 for being outstanding as a publishing firm.
- Nigerian Publishers' Association Fellowship Award – In 1991, the company won the award for its contribution to the publishing industry in Nigeria.
- Concord Press Award – The Company won the Concord Press Award for two consecutive years in 1984 and 1985 in Academic Publishing before the organizers discontinued the competition.
- The Nigerian Stock Exchange Merit Award – The company won the merit award twice in 1986/87 and 1999 for High quality and best Annual Account Presentations.
- Most Valuable Employer Award – The company was given the award in 1996 by the Nigerian Social Insurance Trust Fund in recognition of its prompt and total compliance with the rules and regulations of the Fund.

== Authors and titles ==
The firm has published books for well-known authors in Nigeria including notable authors Wole Soyinka, J.P. Clark, Chukwuemeka Ike, Wande Abimbola, Akinwunmi Isola, Ola Rotimi, Akachi Adimora-Ezeigbo, Adebayo Faleti – and new/upcoming authors Abimbola Alao and Yetunde Lawal.

=== Old publications ===
Publications dating back to 1963 are kept in archives and preserved in memory of the authors in the Nigerian book industry. Early publications that shaped the company and the Nigerian publishing industry include:

Wole Soyinka

- The Lion and the Jewel (1962)
- Kongi's Harvest (1965)

Chukwuemeka Ike

- Sunset at Dawn (1976) ISBN 9789782492821
- The Potter's Wheel (1973)

Ola Rotimi

- The Gods Are Not to Blame (1975) ISBN 9780199110803
- Our Husband Has Gone Mad Again (1977)

J. P. Clark

- The Example of Shakespeare (1968)

Wande Abimbola

- Àwon Ojú Odù Mẹ́rẹ̀ẹ̀rìndínlógún (1977)

Akinwunmi Isola

- Efunsetan Aniwura – Iyalode Ibadan (1970)
- Ó Lekú

Adebayo Faleti

- Ogun Àwítélè (1969)

=== New and core publications ===
UPPLC has a growing archive of lines developed for the pre-primary, primary, secondary, teacher training, tertiary and general readership categories. UPPLC remains one of the major distributors of World Bank Publications in Africa. An inclusion to their general readership category is the new encyclopaedia series with topics in sciences, health, technology, architecture and more.

Core and famous curriculum-based titles such as New Oxford English Course and New Oxford Secondary English Course for primary and secondary schools respectively, as well as English for Primary Schools; MAN Mathematics, which is written by teachers, who are also members of the Mathematical Association of Nigeria (MAN); Exam Focus series, specially compiled for junior and senior secondary school students to aid them in their final exams; the New Young Achievers series for pre-primary and primary schools.

All curriculum-based titles adhere to the Nigerian Educational Research and Development Council (NERDC) Curriculum for the 9-year Universal Basic Education Programme, which covers the student's educational needs from their basic to secondary levels. This will in turn help to meet the demands of their final exams, i.e. Joint Admissions and Matriculation Board (JAMB), National Examination Council (NECO), West African Examinations Council (WAEC) for Basic Education Certificate Examination (BECE) and Senior Secondary Certificate Examination (SSCE). The company includes workbooks and teaching aids with answers for teachers and parents for each corresponding title.

== Events ==
Authors' Forum, an idea conceived by the management of University Press Plc as a forum for finding solutions to the numerous problems facing the book industry in Nigeria, a yearly event which is attended by authors and others from different parts of the country, showcasing lectures and theme discussions.

UPPLC also hosts different events at the Annual Nigeria International Book Fair (NIBF) by organizing activities for primary and secondary school children.

== Nigerian Stock Exchange ==
At incorporation as a public limited liability company in 1978, the company's name was changed to University Press Limited with an authorized share capital of 8,000,000 ordinary shares of 50k each, which since has grown to 2,000,000,000 in 2014. The paid-up share capital of the company is ₦215,704,750 made up of 431,409,500 ordinary shares of 50k each as at 31 March 2014. The company was quoted on the Nigerian Stock Exchange on 14 August 1978. UPPLC, has on two occasions, won the prestigious Stock Exchange Merit Award in the service sector of quoted companies. The company maintains a cordial relationship with OUP, which still has over 9% of its shareholding.

Shareholders' Funds	2013 (NGN '000)	2012 (NGN '000)	2011 (NGN '000)	2010 (NGN '000)	2009 (NGN '000)
Share capital	215,705	215,705	179,753	149,759	149,759
Share premium	175,507	175,507	211,458	241,416	241,416
Capital reserve	1,442	1,422	1,422	1,422	1,422
Fixed assets revaluation surplus	879,300	685,115	209,725	209,725	209,725
