= Lille Stesichorus =

Ancient Greek poetry text

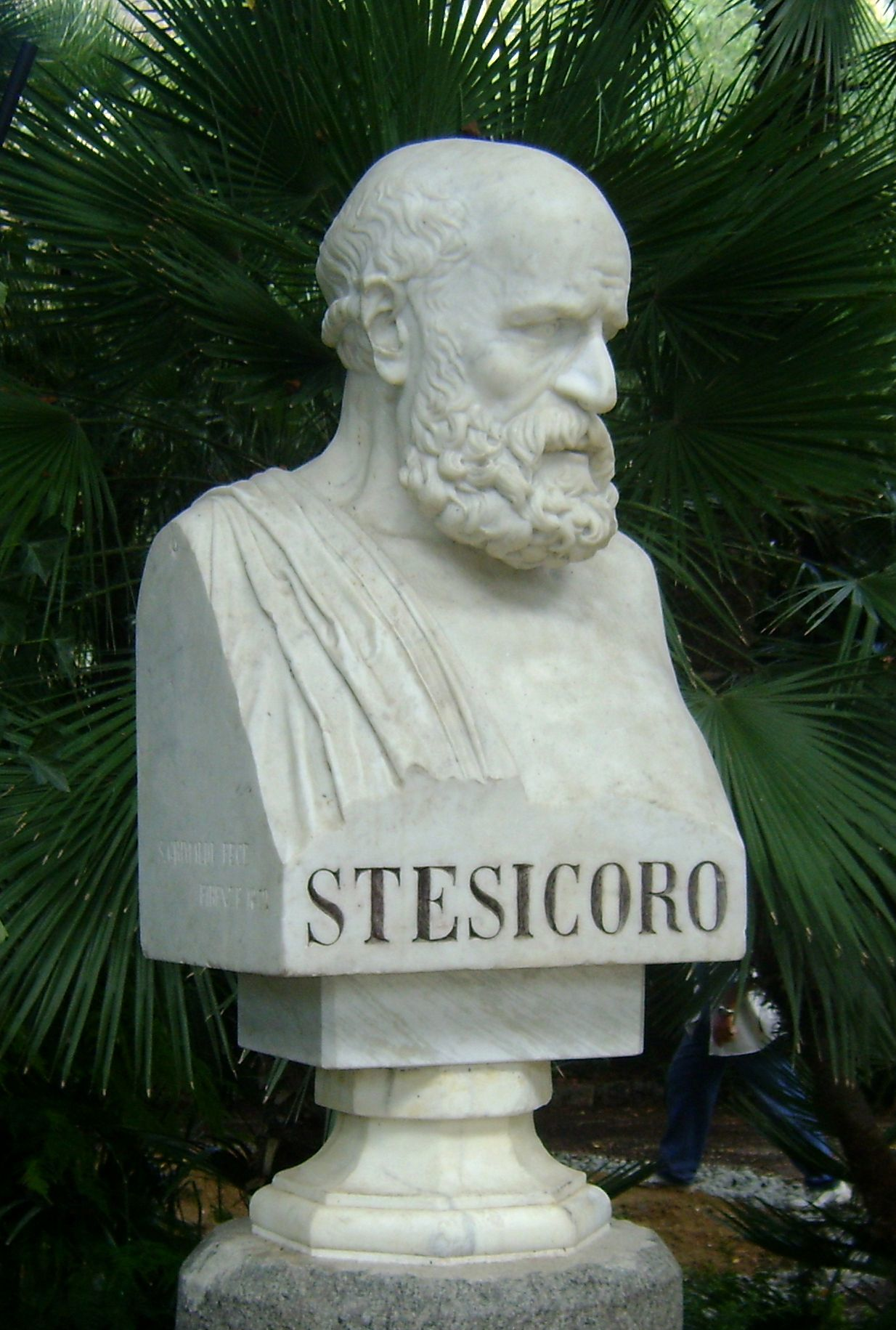
An imaginative bust of Stesichorus, from the town of Catania. The Lille Stesichorus is a tattered papyrus fragment but it offers the best insights into his poetry (if it is indeed his work)

The Lille Stesichorus is a papyrus containing a major fragment of poetry usually attributed to the archaic lyric poet Stesichorus, discovered at Lille University and published in 1976. Some consider it the most important of all the Stesichorus fragments, confirming Stesichorus's role as a historic link between genres as different as Homeric epic and Pindaric lyric. The subject matter and style are viewed as typical of his work, although not all scholars have accepted it as his. The fragment is a narrative treatment of a popular myth involving the family of Oedipus and the tragic history of Thebes. This sheds light on other treatments of the same myth, such as Sophocles' Oedipus Tyrannos and Aeschylus' Seven Against Thebes. The fragment is also significant in the history of colometry, since it includes lyric verses divided into metrical cola, a practice usually associated with the later career of Aristophanes of Byzantium.

== Discovery ==
At the turn of the twentieth century, a mummy case and its contents were deposited at Lille University by Gustave Lefebvre and Pierre Jouguet, the founder of the university's Institute of Egyptology. The papyrus packing material inside the case was covered with ancient Greek script, including fragments of previously unknown poetry, a discovery that was made much later and published in 1976 by Ancher and Meillier. However, they assembled the fragments for publication in the wrong order, basing it purely on considerations of papyrus texture, alignment of lines and length of columns. The correct order for the text was instead worked out by P. J. Parsons and published the following year.

The assembled fragments consisted of 125 consecutive lines, thirty-three of which were virtually intact, representing a portion of a much larger poem (calculated to have been about 700 lines). The verses were structured in triadic stanzas (strophe, antistrophe, epode), typical of choral lyric. Triads are found, for example, in plays by Aeschylus, Sophocles, and Euripides and in odes by Pindar and Bacchylides, and they are known also to have been characteristic of the poetry of Stesichorus. The handwriting indicated that a scribe had written it as early as 250 BC, but the poetic style indicated that the original composition must have been much earlier.

There was no record of a title or author, but the Doric dialect, meter, and overall style suggested that it was probably a work of Stesichorus, written sometime in the first half of the 6th century BC. His authorship was promptly questioned by Bollack et al., and Parsons also was skeptical, noting the Homeric cliches and the "drab, repetitious flaccidity" of the verse. Martin Litchfield West then presented the case in favour of Stesichorus, even turning Parsons' arguments on their head and winning over Parsons himself. Ancient commentators had noted the same characteristics that Parsons had found fault with: Stesichorus could be long-winded and flaccid (redundat et effunditur, Quintilian 10.1.62) and "most Homeric" (Ὁμηρικώτατος, Longinus 13.3). However, West was careful not to endorse Parson's low opinion of the fragment's artistic quality.

== Significance ==
The fragment's importance may be understood in terms of the tenuous state of Stesichorean scholarship prior to the discovery. In 1841, the philologist Theodor Bergk could publish only fifty-three small fragments attributed to Stesichorus, the longest only six lines. The situation was hardly different by the time Denys Page published Poetae Melici Graeci in 1962. Five years later it was still possible to comment: "Time has dealt more harshly with Stesichorus than with any other major lyric poet ... no passage longer than six lines is quoted from him, and papyrus finds have been meagre. For an estimate of his poetry we depend almost wholly on hearsay [from ancient commentators]." That same year, 1967, Edgar Lobel published the papyrus remnants of another three poems, which were later included in Page's Supplementum Lyricis Graecis in 1974, the longest, however, was just twelve lines. Thus, the sudden appearance of the Lille Stesichorus in 1976, with over 125 lines, thirty-three virtually intact, was a cause of considerable excitement in scholarly circles.

The contents of the fragment seem not to fit any of the titles attested for Stesichorus, though the first book of Eripyle has been suggested. The context of the original poem is clearly the Theban myth of the ill-fated Labdakid clan. The first 175 lines are missing, but they probably dealt summarily with the demise of Oedipus, the quarrel between his sons Eteocles and Polynices, and the intervention of the seer Tiresias. The best preserved section (lines 201–34) is a speech by the Theban queen, who is not named but who is probably Jocasta, sometimes known as Epicaste, the mother and wife of Oedipus and thus the grandmother/mother of Eteocles and Polynices (she is probably not Euryganeia, who, in some versions of the Oedipus myth, is his second wife and the mother of his children, yet the fragment does not allow for certainty on this issue).

The artistic merit of the verses has been questioned by Parsons, for example, but it also has admirers. Jocasta may be thought to emerge from her speech as a strong woman who seeks practical solutions to the plight of her sons even while feeling distress and anxiety for them:

"Taken as a whole the passage is remarkable for its combination of great emotional power and the dignity of traditional epic diction. There is an emotional vibrancy that goes beyond epic forms...this text reveals Stesichorus' full mastery of his technique, handling epic situations and characters with the flexibility and poignancy of lyric." – Charles Segal

The fragment indicates that Stesichorus might have been the first author to interpret the fate of the Labdacid clan in a wider political context. It also indicates that he portrayed characters from a psychological perspective, revealing them through their own words, in a manner not achieved in epic. Thus the repetitions that some critics have regarded as a weakness can have a dramatic effect, revealing for example the intensity of Jocasta's grief and her deep concern for her children.

The fragment aids not just our understanding of Stesichorus but also our understanding of other authors who treated the same myth, such as Aeschylus in Seven Against Thebes, Sophocles in Oedipus Rex and Euripides in The Phoenician Women, and this in turn reflects back on the fragment. The Phoenician Women for example includes a scene that bears a strong resemblance to the best preserved part of the fragment, in which Jocasta tries to mediate between her feuding sons, and the dramatist may have modelled it on the poem (Euripides's readiness to model his plays on Stesichorean versions of traditional myth is shown also in his play Helen, adapted from a Stesichorus poem of the same name) Euripides' Jocasta commits suicide after witnessing the deaths of her sons and maybe Stesichorus' poem ended the same way. There is as well a strong resemblance between the Stesichorean Jocasta and the queen in Oedipus Rex, in her dramatic plight, her rhetoric, her dismissal of oracles and her doomed attempt to subvert Fate, so that her dramatic role might even be regarded as the unique creation of Stesichorus rather than Sophocles. It has been argued that the Stesichorean Jocasta might speak her lines in response to a prophetic dream, like Clytemnestra in another one of Stesichorus' poems. (Note: Plutarch (On the slow revenge of the deity) preserves a quote from Stesichorus, describing Clytemnestra's dream: "And it seemed to her that a snake came, the top of its head bloodstained, and out of it appeared a Pleisthenid king"; translated by D. Campbell, Stesichorus fragment 219, Greek Lyric Vol. III, p. 133.) The dream motif was borrowed by Aeschylus for his own version of the Clytemnestra character in Libation Bearers.

The fragment also has implications for our understanding of ancient scholarship, especially the manner in which poetic texts were transmitted. It was usual in ancient times for uniform verses to be written out in lines, as for example lines of dactylic hexameter in epic verse and iambic trimeter in drama, but lyric verses, which feature varying metrical units or cola, were written out like prose. Aristophanes of Byzantium is known to have converted such lyrical "prose" into lines of verse, varying in length and meter according to cola, and it is to his efforts for example that we owe the manuscript tradition for Pindar. It has been assumed that he was an innovator in this practice of colometry but the Lille Stesichorus is the work of an earlier scribe and the lyrics are written in lines according to cola, not in the manner of prose.

== The queen's speech ==
The best preserved part of the fragment mainly comprises the queen's speech (lines 204–31). The context is not entirely clear. For example, the fate of Oedipus is unknown, though her arrangements for his property imply that he is dead. Her mention of a family curse suggests that her two sons are born from an incestuous marriage and that she therefore is Jocasta/Epicaste. She speaks in response to a prophecy that her sons are to kill each other in a feud and her attempts to resolve the issue point forward to the well-known scenario covered by Aeschylus in the Seven Against Thebes, where one son returns from exile with an army to claim the throne. Thus, ironically, her dismissal of Fate and her attempts to dodge it only help seal their doom, and there is a suggestion of tragic self-delusion. She begins by addressing Apollo, or possibly his interpreter, Tiresias, in a gnomic style, typically a Homeric approach, and then addresses her sons. The meter is dactylo-epitrite, a lyrical variation on the dactylic hexameter used by Homer (some of the lines are in fact quasi-dactylic hexameter).

The Greek text is Haslam's, reproduced by Segal and Campbell. The square brackets indicate gaps in the papyrus and enclose conjectured words, while brackets < > enclose letters omitted by the scribe. The translation mimics the quantitative verse of the original by retaining a given number of syllables per line rather than just by substituting accentual rhythm for quantitative rhythm.

Epode
Not forever nor for all have the deathless gods established on the hallowed earth Unremitting war between men, Nor even unremitting love, but rather thoughts that change day by day: That is the gods' will. Therefore, your prophecies (I beseech you, far-reaching Apollo!); Might not all be fulfilled.	οὔτε γὰρ αἰέν ὁμῶς θεοὶ θέσαν ἀθάνατοι κατ' αἶαν ἱρὰν νεῖκος ἔμπεδον βροτοῖσιν οὺδέ γα μὰν φιλότατ', ἐπὶ δ' ἀμέραι ἐν νόον ἄλλον θεοὶ τιθεῖσι. μαντοσύνας δέ τεὰς ἄναξ ἑκάεργος Ἀπόλλων μὴ πάσας τελέσσαι. (Note: Last two lines of the stanza are translated by Segal as "and do not, O lord far-shooter Apollo, accomplish all your prophecies", but Cambell (Loeb) treats the lines as addressed to Tiresias: "As for your prophecies, may the far-working lord Apollo not accomplish them all". See References.)
Strophe
But if to see both my sons die, each at the hand of the other, Is my appointed lot, and their fate has been spun, Let the fulfilment of an abhorrent death be mine this instant Rather than make me endure that terrible, pitiful aggravation of my pain, My sons within the palace dead, or the city in the foe's hands.	αἰ δέ με παίδας ἰδέσθαι ὑπ' ἀλλάλοισ<ι> δαμέντας μόρσιμόν ἐστιν, ἐπεκλώσαν δὲ Μοίρα[ι], αὐτίκα μοι θανάτου τέλος στυγερο[ῖο] γέν[οιτο πρίν ποκα ταῦτ' ἐσιδεῖν ἄλγεσ<σ>ι πολύστονα δακρυόεντα [ παίδας ἐνὶ μεγάροις θανόντας ἢ πόλιν ἁλοίσαν.
Antistrophe
But listen, Boys, to my words, my children, and yield to persuasion, For I can anticipate how all this may end, One of you keeping the palace, to dwell by the springs of Dirke, The other taking the gold and all your dear father's possessions, to live in exile, Whomever the rolling dice allots first place according to Fate.	ἀλλ' ἄγε, παίδες, ἐμοῖς μύθοις, φίλα [τέκνα, πίθεσθε, τᾴιδε γὰρ ὑμὶν ἐγὼν τέλος προφα[ίνω, τὸν μὲν ἔχοντα δόμους ναίειν πα[ρὰ νάμασι Δίρκας, τὸν δ' ἀπίμεν κτεάνη καί χρυσὸν ἔχοντα φίλου σύμπαντα [ πατρός, κλαροπαληδὸν ὅς ἂν πρᾱτος λάχηι ἕκατι Μοιρᾱν.
Epode
It is in this way, I think, that both of you may gain release from that doom foretold By the prophet of Apollo, If it is true what men say, that the city of Cadmus and his heirs Are guarded by Zeus, Ever deferring until a distant tomorrow the evils Destined to claim our race.	τοῦτο γὰρ ἂν δοκέω λυτήριον ὔμμι κακοῦ γένοιτα πότμο[υ μάντιος φραδαῖσι θείου, ἄι γ' ἐτεὸν Κρονίδας γένος τε καὶ ἄστυ [ φυλάξει Κάδμου ἄνακτος, ἀμβάλλων κακότατα πολὺν χρόνον [ ἃ βασιλείαι πέπρωται γενέ[θ]λαι.
