= Grip Am =

- Written by: Ola Rotimi
- Original language: Pidgin English
- Genre: Comedy
- Setting: Nigeria

Grip Am is a play by Olawale Gladstone Emmanuel Rotimi, best known as Ola Rotimi, a playwright and theatre director. The play centers around Isa, a poor farmer who has many challenges in his life alongside a difficult marriage.

== Synopsis ==
The play follows the story of a farmer, Ise, whose journey has not been favourable for him as he has different challenges and also a difficult marriage with Aso, his wife. One day, an angel visits Ise and grants him one wish. Ise wishes for the ability to trap anyone or anything that climbs his orange tree by saying the words "Grip Am".

Through the play, the power leads to several comedic situations as Ise uses it to gain control over the issues around his life. He was able to trap the Angel of death and makes him promise not to harm him or his wife.

== Background ==
The story is set in Africa and follows Ise and his wife, Aso. They live a difficult life with their marriage also been a problem. The story gets a twist when an angel visits them to grant them both a wish. Ise wishes to trap anyone or anything to his orange tree while his wife wishes to send an angel of Death to kill her husband.

Her husband traps the Angel of Death and makes him promise not to kill him or his wife. Beneath the humor, the play shows the misuse of power and the consequences of manipulating others for personal gain.

== Characters ==
1. Ise: A poor farmer with a difficult marriage.
2. Aso: Ise's wife, who is often in argument with him
3. Angel: A supernatural being sent by God to grant wishes to Ise and Aso.
4. Die: Represents death itself.

== Language ==
Nigerian Pidgin English is the choice of language for the comedic play as it displays Nigerian culture, making it relatable to its local audience. Pidgin English enhances the play's comedic twists through its expressive and colorful nature, allowing for clever wordplay and humor. Additionally, the language serves as a vehicle for social commentary, highlighting the struggles of ordinary people like Ise and Aso and also serves as a critique on power dynamics and human nature.
