= Oedipus Rex =

Classical Athenian tragedy by Sophocles

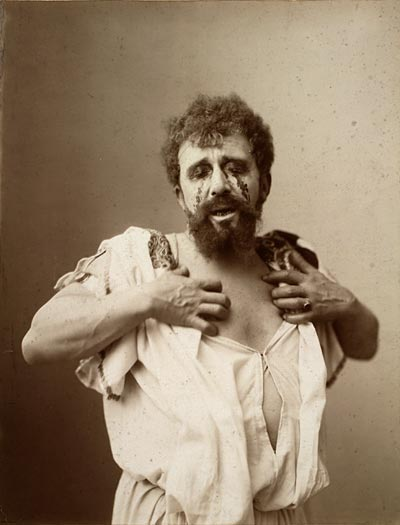
- Louis Bouwmeester as Oedipus in a Dutch production of Oedipus Rex, c. 1896
- Original language: Classical Greek
- Written by: Sophocles
- Chorus: Theban Elders
- Characters: Oedipus; Priest; Creon; Tiresias; Jocasta; Messenger; Shepherd; Second Messenger
- Mute: Daughters of Oedipus (Antigone and Ismene)
- Series: Theban Plays
- Genre: Tragedy
- Setting: Thebes

Premiere
- Date: c. 429 BC
- Place: Theatre of Dionysus, Athens

Oedipus Rex, also known by its Greek title, Oedipus Tyrannus (Ancient Greek: Οἰδίπους Τύραννος, pronounced [oidípuːs týrannos]), or Oedipus the King, is an Athenian tragedy written by Sophocles. The play is thought to have been first performed c. 429 BC, although this is highly uncertain. Although the play won only second place at its initial performance, it was later considered by Aristotle to be one of the greatest Greek tragedies, and is now widely considered one of the greatest plays of Western literature, and the most famous of all Greek tragedies.

Oedipus Rex is likely the fourth out of the seven surviving plays by Sophocles. It is one of three surviving plays that deal with the story of Oedipus and Thebes. Of the three, Oedipus Rex was the second to be written, following Antigone by about a dozen years. However, in terms of the chronology of events described by the plays, it comes first, followed by Oedipus at Colonus and then Antigone.

Prior to the start of Oedipus Rex, Oedipus has become the king of Thebes while unwittingly fulfilling a prophecy that he would kill his father, Laius (the previous king), and marry his mother, Jocasta (whom Oedipus took as his queen after solving the riddle of the Sphinx). The action of Sophocles' play concerns Oedipus' search for the murderer of Laius in order to end a plague ravaging Thebes, unaware that the killer he is looking for is none other than himself. At the end of the play, after the truth finally comes to light, Jocasta hangs herself while Oedipus, horrified at his patricide and incest, proceeds to gouge out his own eyes in despair.

In his Poetics, Aristotle refers several times to the play in order to exemplify aspects of the genre of tragedy.

== Title ==
Although the play is best known as Oedipus Rex, this title is anachronistic as "Rex" is the Latin word for king. Originally, to the ancient Greeks, the title was simply Oedipus (Οἰδίπους), as it is referred to by Aristotle in the Poetics. It is thought to have been renamed Oedipus Tyrannus to distinguish it from Oedipus at Colonus, a later play by Sophocles. The literal translation of this title is Oedipus the Tyrant. In antiquity, the term "tyrant" referred to a ruler with no legitimate claim to rule, but it did not necessarily have a negative connotation.

== Context ==
=== Curse upon Laius ===
The misfortunes of Thebes are believed to be the result of a curse laid upon Laius for the time he had violated the sacred laws of hospitality (Greek: xenia).

In his youth, Laius was taken in as a guest by Pelops, king of Elis, where he would become tutor to the king's youngest son, Chrysippus, in chariot racing. Apollo, the protector of youth and boys, cursed him for kidnapping and raping Chrysippus.

=== Birth of Oedipus ===
When Laius's son is born, he consults an oracle as to his fortune. To his horror, the oracle reveals that Laius "is doomed to perish by the hand of his own son." Laius binds the infant's feet together with a pin and orders Jocasta to kill him. Unable to do so to her own son, Jocasta orders a servant to expose the infant on a mountaintop. The servant, moved by pity, gives the child to a shepherd, who unbinds the infant's ankles, and names him Oedipus, "swollen foot". The shepherd brings the infant to Corinth, and presents him to the childless king Polybus, who raises Oedipus as his own son.

=== Oedipus and the Oracle ===
As he grows to manhood, Oedipus hears a rumour that he is not truly the son of Polybus and his wife, Merope. He asks the Delphic Oracle who his parents really are. The Oracle seems to ignore this question, telling him instead that he is destined to "mate with [his] own mother, and shed/With [his] own hands the blood of [his] own sire." Desperate to avoid this terrible fate, Oedipus, who still believes that Polybus and Merope are his true parents, leaves Corinth for the city of Thebes.

=== Fulfilling prophecy ===
==== The old man ====
On the road to Thebes, Oedipus encounters an old man and his servants. The two begin to quarrel over whose chariot has the right of way. While the old man moves to strike the insolent youth with his scepter, Oedipus throws the man down from his chariot, killing him. Thus, the prophecy in which Oedipus slays his own father is fulfilled, as the old man—as Oedipus discovers later—was Laius, king of Thebes and true father to Oedipus.

==== Riddle of the Sphinx ====
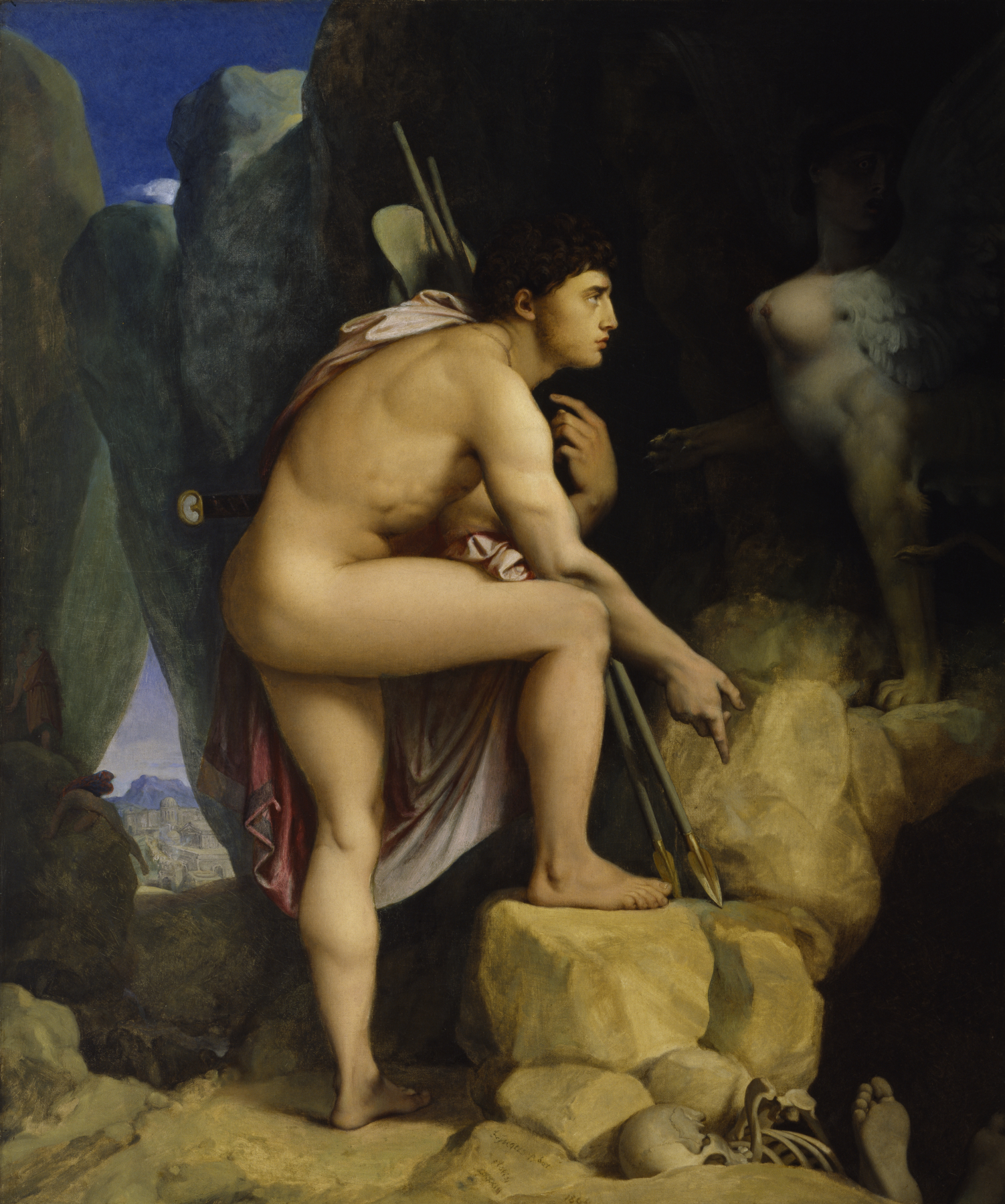
Oedipus after he solves the riddle of the Sphinx (1864), Jean-Auguste-Dominique Ingres, Walters Art Museum

Arriving at Thebes, a city in turmoil, Oedipus encounters the Sphinx, a legendary beast with the head and breasts of a woman, the body of a lioness, and the wings of an eagle. The Sphinx, perched on a hill, was devouring Thebans and travelers one by one if they could not solve her riddle.

The precise riddle asked by the Sphinx varied in early traditions, and is not explicitly stated in Oedipus Rex, as the event precedes the play. However, according to the most widely related version of the riddle, the Sphinx asks, "What is the creature that walks on four legs in the morning, two legs at noon, and three in the evening?" Oedipus, blessed with great intelligence, answers correctly: "man" (Greek: anthrôpos), who crawls on all fours as an infant; walks upright in maturity; and leans on a stick in old age.

Bested by the prince, the Sphinx throws herself from a cliff, thereby ending the curse. Oedipus's reward for freeing Thebes from the Sphinx is kingship to the city and the hand of its dowager queen, Jocasta. None, at that point, realize that Jocasta is Oedipus's true mother. Thus, unbeknownst to either character, the remaining prophecy has been fulfilled.

== Plot ==
Oedipus, King of Thebes, sends his brother-in-law, Creon, to ask the advice of the oracle at Delphi, concerning a plague ravaging Thebes. Creon returns to report that the plague is the result of religious pollution, since the murderer of their former king, Laius, has never been caught. Oedipus vows to find the murderer and curses him for causing the plague.

Oedipus summons the blind prophet Tiresias for help. Tiresias admits to knowing the answers to Oedipus's questions, but he refuses to speak, instead telling Oedipus to abandon his search. Angered by the seer's reply, Oedipus accuses him of complicity in Laius's murder. The offended Tiresias then reveals to the king that "you yourself are the criminal you seek". Oedipus does not understand how this could be, and supposes that Creon must have paid Tiresias to accuse him. The two argue vehemently, as Oedipus mocks Tiresias's lack of sight, and Tiresias retorts that Oedipus himself is blind. Eventually, the prophet leaves, muttering darkly that when the murderer is discovered, he shall be a native of Thebes, brother and father to his own children, and son and husband to his own mother.

Creon arrives to face Oedipus's accusations. The King demands that Creon be executed; however, the chorus persuades him to let Creon live. Jocasta, wife of first Laius and then Oedipus, enters and attempts to comfort Oedipus, telling him he should take no notice of prophets. As proof, she recounts an incident in which she and Laius received an oracle which never came true. The prophecy stated that Laius would be killed by his own son; instead, Laius was killed by bandits, at a fork in the road (τριπλαῖς ἁμαξιτοῖς, triplais amaxitois).

The mention of the place causes Oedipus to pause and ask for more details. Jocasta specifies the branch to Daulis on the way to Delphi. Recalling Tiresias's words, he asks Jocasta to describe Laius. The king then sends for a shepherd, the only surviving witness of the attack, to be brought from his fields to the palace.

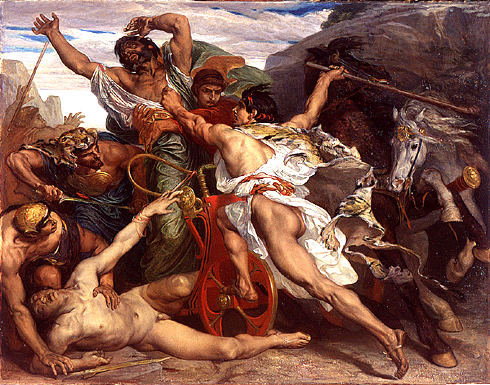
Joseph Blanc, The murder of Laïus by Oedipus, 1867, Paris, Ecole Nationale Supérieure des Beaux-Arts

Confused, Jocasta asks Oedipus what the matter is, and he tells her. Many years ago, at a banquet in Corinth, a man drunkenly accused Oedipus of not being his father's son. Oedipus went to Delphi and asked the oracle about his parentage. Instead of answering his question directly, the oracle prophesied that he would one day murder his father and sleep with his mother. Upon hearing this, Oedipus resolved never to return to Corinth. In his travels, he came to the very crossroads where Laius had been killed, and encountered a carriage that attempted to drive him off the road. An argument ensued, and Oedipus killed the travelers—including a man who matched Jocasta's description of Laius. However, Oedipus holds out hope that he was not Laius's killer, because Laius was said to have been murdered by several robbers. If the shepherd confirms that Laius was attacked by many men, then Oedipus will be in the clear.

A man arrives from Corinth with the message that Polybus, who raised Oedipus as his son, has died. To the surprise of the messenger, Oedipus is overjoyed, because he can no longer kill his father, thus disproving half of the oracle's prophecy. However, he still fears that he might somehow commit incest with his mother. Eager to set the king's mind at ease, the messenger tells him not to worry, because Merope is not his real mother.

The messenger explains that years earlier, while tending his flock on Mount Cithaeron, a shepherd from the household of Laius brought him an infant that he was instructed to dispose of. The messenger had then given the child to Polybus, who raised him. Oedipus asks the chorus if anyone knows the identity of the other shepherd, or where he might be now. They respond that he is the same shepherd who witnessed the murder of Laius, and whom Oedipus had already sent for. Jocasta, realizing the truth, desperately begs Oedipus to stop asking questions. When Oedipus refuses, the queen runs into the palace.

When the shepherd arrives, Oedipus questions him, but he begs to be allowed to leave without answering further. However, Oedipus presses him, finally threatening him with torture or execution. It emerges that the child he gave away was Laius's own son. In fear of a prophecy that the child would kill his father, Jocasta gave her son to the shepherd in order to be exposed upon the mountainside.

Everything is at last revealed, and Oedipus curses himself and fate before leaving the stage. The chorus laments how even a great man can be felled by fate, and following this, a servant exits the palace to speak of what has happened inside. Jocasta has hanged herself in her bedchamber. Entering the palace in anguish, Oedipus called on his servants to bring him a sword, that he might slay Jocasta with his own hand. But upon discovering the lifeless queen, Oedipus takes her down and removes the long gold pins from her dress. He then gouges out his own eyes in despair.

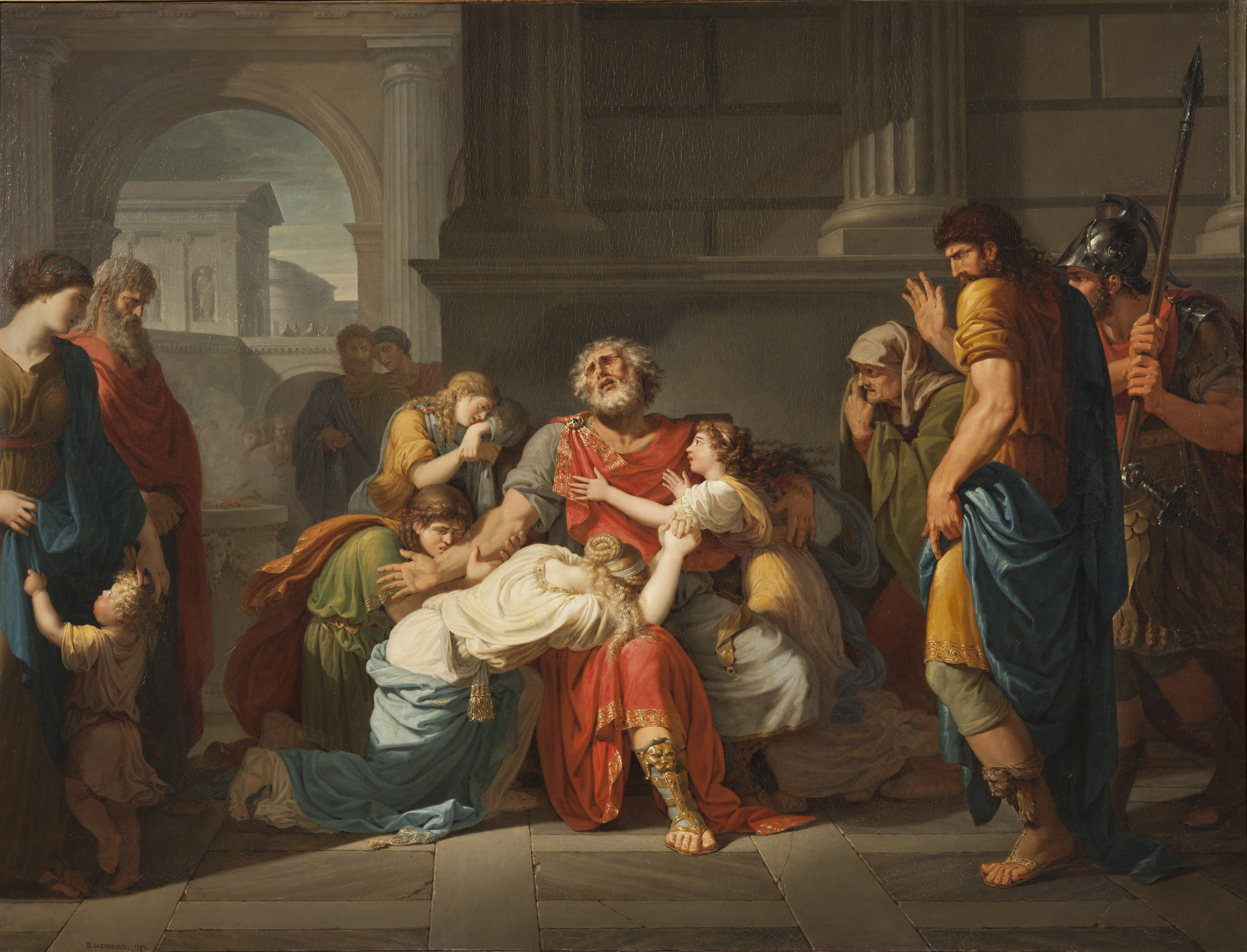
Bénigne Gagneraux, The Blind Oedipus Commending his Children to the Gods

The blinded king now exits the palace, and begs to be exiled. Creon enters, saying that Oedipus shall be taken into the house until oracles can be consulted regarding what is best to be done. Oedipus's two daughters (and half-sisters), Antigone and Ismene, are sent out and Oedipus laments their having been born to such a cursed family. He begs Creon to watch over them, in hopes that they will live where there is opportunity for them, and to have a better life than their father. Creon agrees, before sending Oedipus back into the palace.

On an empty stage, the chorus repeats the common Greek maxim that "no man should be considered fortunate until he is dead."

== Relationship with mythic tradition ==
The two cities of Troy and Thebes were the major focus of Greek epic poetry. The events surrounding the Trojan War were chronicled in the Epic Cycle, of which much remains, and those about Thebes in the Theban Cycle, which have been lost. The Theban Cycle recounted the sequence of tragedies that befell the house of Laius, of which the story of Oedipus is a part.

Homer's Odyssey (XI. 271ff.) contains the earliest account of the Oedipus myth when Odysseus encounters Jocasta (named Epicaste) in the underworld. Homer briefly summarises the story of Oedipus, including the incest, patricide, and Jocasta's subsequent suicide. However, in the Homeric version, Oedipus remains King of Thebes after the revelation and neither blinds himself, nor is sent into exile. In particular, it is said that the gods made the matter of his paternity known, whilst in Oedipus the King, Oedipus very much discovers the truth himself.

In 467 BC, Sophocles's fellow tragedian Aeschylus won first prize at the City Dionysia with a trilogy about the House of Laius, comprising Laius, Oedipus and Seven Against Thebes (the only play which survives). Since he did not write connected trilogies as Aeschylus did, Oedipus Rex focuses on the titular character while hinting at the larger myth obliquely, which was already known to the audience in Athens at the time.

== Reception ==
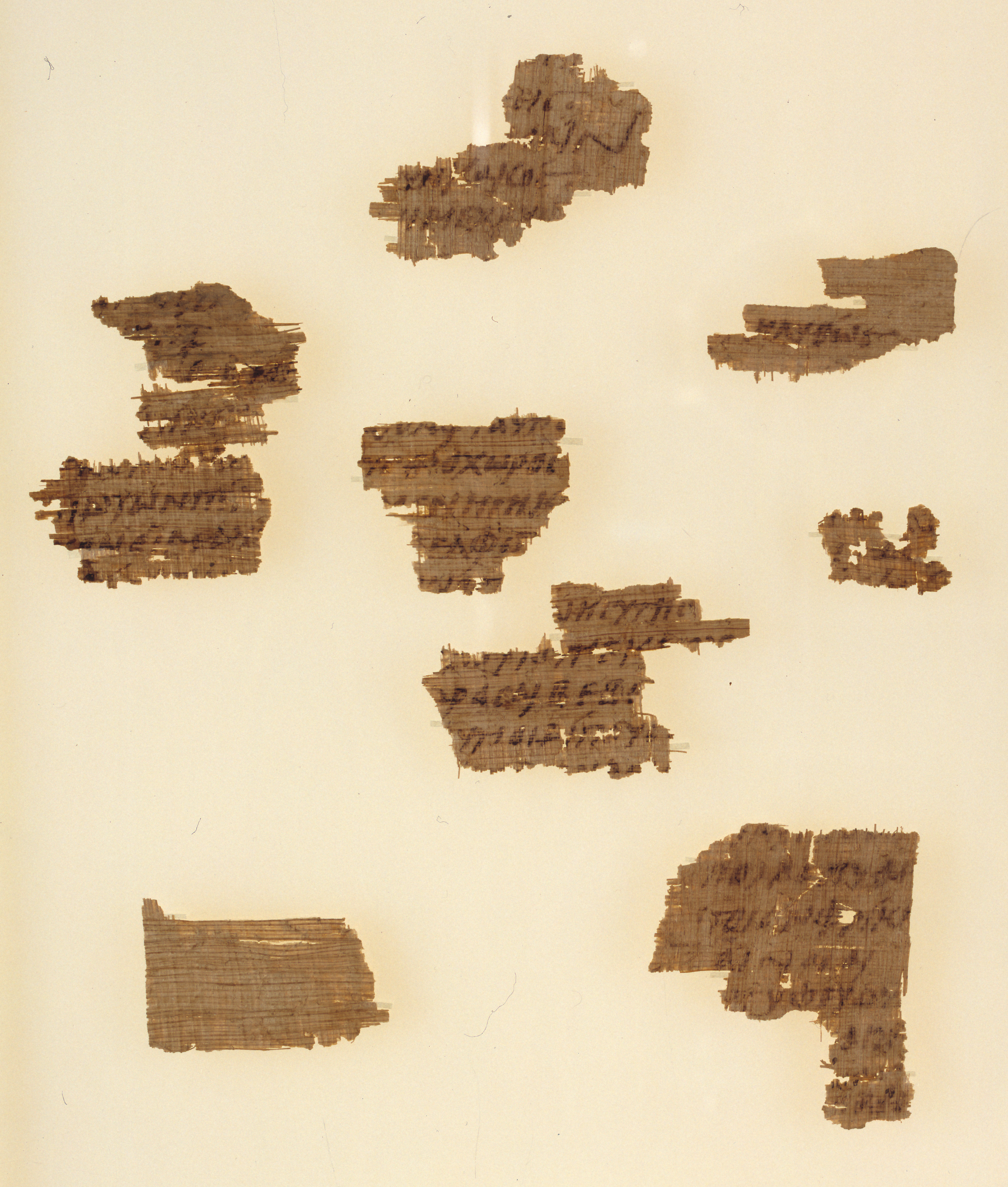
P. Oxy. 1369, a fragmentary papyrus copy of Oedipus Rex, 4th century BC

The trilogy containing Oedipus Rex took second prize in the City Dionysia at its original performance. Aeschylus's nephew Philocles took first prize at that competition. However, in his Poetics, Aristotle considered Oedipus Rex to be the tragedy which best matched his prescription for how drama should be made.

Many modern critics agree with Aristotle on the quality of Oedipus Rex, even if they don't always agree on the reasons. For example, Richard Claverhouse Jebb claimed that "The Oedipus Tyrannus is in one sense the masterpiece of Attic tragedy. No other shows an equal degree of art in the development of the plot; and this excellence depends on the powerful and subtle drawing of the characters." Cedric Whitman noted that "the Oedipus Rex passes almost universally for the greatest extant Greek play". Whitman himself regarded the play as "the fullest expression of this conception of tragedy", that is the conception of tragedy as a "revelation of the evil lot of man", where a man may have "all the equipment for glory and honor" but still have "the greatest effort to do good" end in "the evil of an unbearable self for which one is not responsible". Edith Hall referred to Oedipus the King as "this definitive tragedy" and notes that "the magisterial subtlety of Sophocles' characterization thus lend credibility to the breathtaking coincidences", and notes the irony that "Oedipus can only fulfill his exceptional god-ordained destiny because Oedipus is a preeminently capable and intelligent human being." H. D. F. Kitto said about Oedipus Rex that "it is true to say that the perfection of its form implies a world order", although Kitto notes that whether or not that world order "is beneficent, Sophocles does not say."

The science revolution attributed to Thales began gaining political force, and this play offered a warning to the new thinkers. Kitto interprets the play as Sophocles's retort to the sophists, by dramatizing a situation in which humans face undeserved suffering through no fault of their own, but despite the apparent randomness of the events, the fact that they have been prophesied by the gods implies that the events are not random, despite the reasons being beyond human comprehension. Through the play, according to Kitto, Sophocles declares "that it is wrong, in the face of the incomprehensible and unmoral, to deny the moral laws and accept chaos. What is right is to recognize facts and not delude ourselves. The universe is a unity; if, sometimes, we can see neither rhyme nor reason in it we should not suppose it is random. There is so much that we cannot know and cannot control that we should not think and behave as if we do know and can control."

Oedipus Rex is widely regarded as one of the greatest plays, stories, and tragedies ever written. The Guardian's theatre critic Michael Billington included it in his list of the 101 greatest plays ever written.

== Themes, irony and motifs ==
=== Fate, free will, or tragic flaw ===
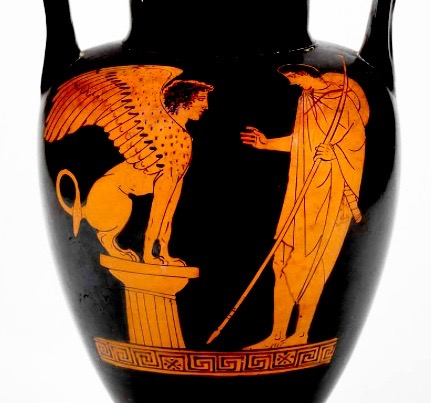
A Greek amphora depicting Oedipus and the Sphinx, c. 450 BC

Fate is a motif that often occurs in Greek writing, tragedies in particular. Likewise, where the attempt to avoid an oracle is the very thing that enables it to happen is common to many Greek myths. For example, similarities to Oedipus can be seen in the myth of Perseus's birth.

Two oracles in particular dominate the plot of Oedipus Rex. Jocasta relates the prophecy that was told to Laius before the birth of Oedipus (lines 711–4):

[The oracle] told him
that it was his fate that he should die a victim
at the hands of his own son, a son to be born
of Laius and me.

The oracle told to Laius tells only of the patricide, whereas the incest is missing. Prompted by Jocasta's recollection, Oedipus reveals the prophecy which caused him to leave Corinth (lines 791–3):

that I was fated to lie with my mother,
and show to daylight an accursed breed
which men would not endure, and I was doomed
to be murderer of the father that begot me.

The implication of Laius's oracle is ambiguous. One interpretation considers that the presentation of Laius's oracle in this play differs from that found in Aeschylus's Oedipus trilogy produced in 467 BC. Smith (2005) argues that "Sophocles had the option of making the oracle to Laius conditional (if Laius has a son, that son will kill him) or unconditional (Laius will have a son who will kill him). Both Aeschylus and Euripides write plays in which the oracle is conditional; Sophocles ... chooses to make Laius's oracle unconditional and thus removes culpability for his sins from Oedipus, for he could not have done other than what he did, no matter what action he took."

This interpretation is supported by Jocasta's repetition of the oracle at lines 854–855: "Loxias declared that the king should be killed by/ his own son." In Greek, Jocasta uses the verb chrênai: "to be fated, necessary." This iteration of the oracle seems to suggest that it was unconditional and inevitable.

Other scholars have nonetheless argued that Sophocles follows tradition in making Laius's oracle conditional, and thus avoidable. They point to Jocasta's initial disclosure of the oracle at lines 711–14. In Greek, the oracle cautions: "hôs auton hexoi moira pros paidos thanein/ hostis genoit emou te kakeinou para." The two verbs in boldface indicate what is called a "future more vivid" condition: if a child is born to Laius, his fate to be killed by that child will overtake him.

Whatever the meaning of Laius's oracle, the one delivered to Oedipus is clearly unconditional. Given the modern conception of fate and fatalism, readers of the play have a tendency to view Oedipus as a mere puppet controlled by greater forces; a man crushed by the gods and fate for no good reason. This, however, is not an entirely accurate reading. While it is a mythological truism that oracles exist to be fulfilled, oracles do not cause the events that lead up to the outcome. In his landmark essay "On Misunderstanding the Oedipus Rex", E. R. Dodds draws upon Bernard Knox's comparison with Jesus' prophecy at the Last Supper that Peter would deny him three times. Jesus knows that Peter will do this, but readers would in no way suggest that Peter was a puppet of fate being forced to deny Christ. Free will and predestination are by no means mutually exclusive, and such is the case with Oedipus.

The oracle delivered to Oedipus is what is often called a "self-fulfilling prophecy", whereby a prophecy itself sets in motion events that conclude with its own fulfilment. This, however, is not to say that Oedipus is a victim of fate and has no free will. The oracle inspires a series of specific choices, freely made by Oedipus, which lead him to kill his father and marry his mother. Oedipus chooses not to return to Corinth after hearing the oracle, just as he chooses to head toward Thebes, to kill Laius, and to take Jocasta specifically as his wife. In response to the plague at Thebes, he chooses to send Creon to the Oracle for advice and then to follow that advice, initiating the investigation into Laius's murder. None of these choices are predetermined.

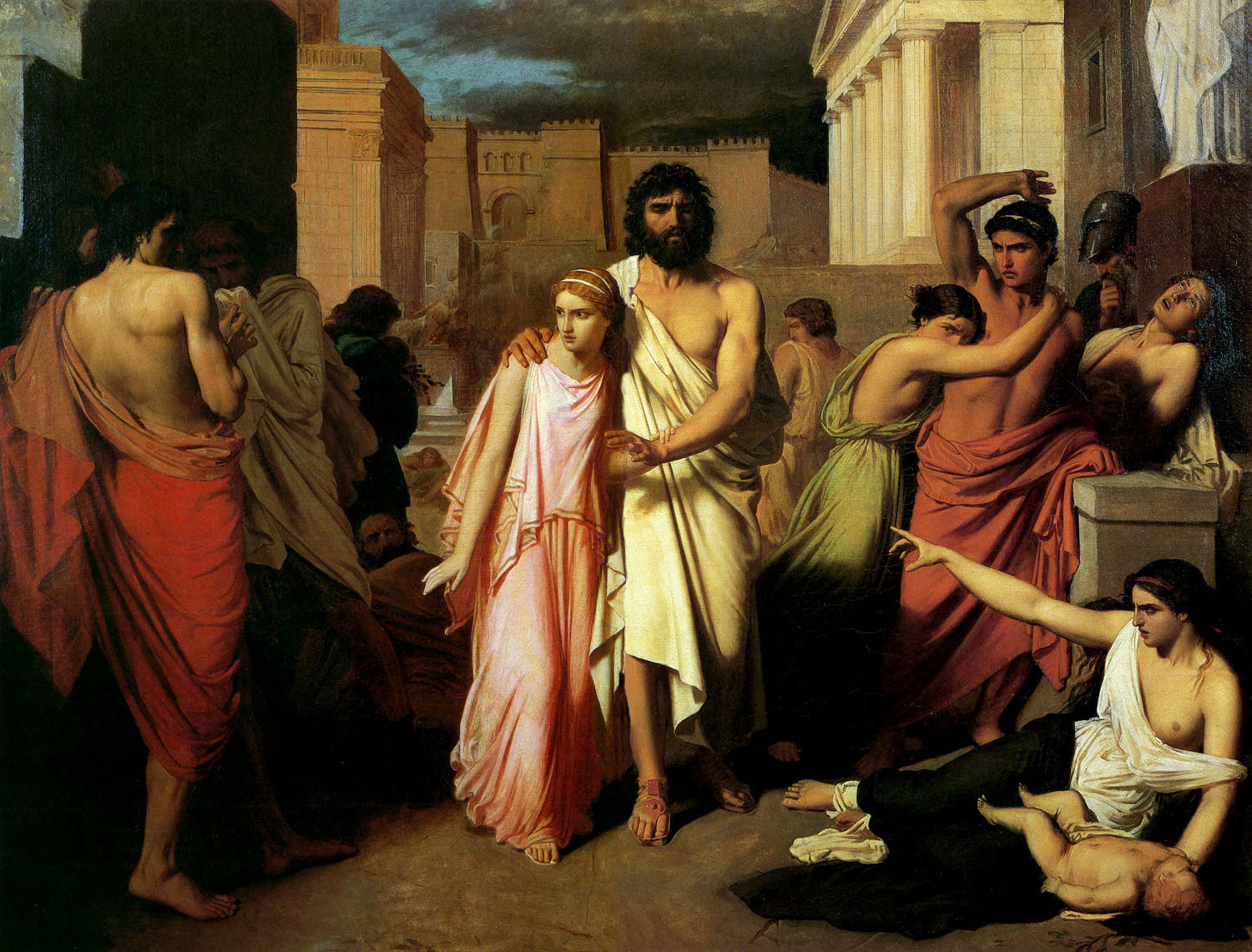
Oedipus and Antigone, by Charles Jalabert

Another characteristic of oracles in myth is that they are almost always misunderstood by those who hear them; hence Oedipus misunderstanding the significance of the Delphic Oracle. He visits Delphi to find out who his real parents are and assumes that the Oracle refuses to answer that question, offering instead an unrelated prophecy which forecasts patricide and incest. Oedipus's assumption is incorrect: the Oracle does, in a way, answer his question. On closer analysis, the oracle contains essential information which Oedipus seems to neglect. The wording of the Oracle: "I was doomed to be murderer of the father that begot me" refers to Oedipus's real, biological father. Likewise the mother with polluted children is defined as the biological one. The wording of the drunken guest on the other hand: "you are not your father's son" defines Polybus as only a foster father to Oedipus. The two wordings support each other and point to the "two sets of parents" alternative. Thus the question of two sets of parents, biological and foster, is raised. Oedipus's reaction to the Oracle is irrational: he states he did not get any answer and he flees in a direction away from Corinth, showing that he firmly believed at the time that Polybus and Merope are his real parents.

The scene with the drunken guest constitutes the end of Oedipus's childhood. He can no longer ignore a feeling of uncertainty about his parentage. However, after consulting the Oracle this uncertainty disappears, strangely enough, and is replaced by a totally unjustified certainty that he is the son of Merope and Polybus. We have said that this irrational behaviour—his hamartia, as Aristotle puts it—is due to the repression of a whole series of thoughts in his consciousness, in fact everything that referred to his earlier doubts about his parentage.

=== State control ===
The exploration of the theme of state control in Oedipus Rex is paralleled by the examination of the conflict between the individual and the state in Antigone. The dilemma that Oedipus faces here is similar to that of the tyrannical Creon: each man has, as king, made a decision that his subjects question or disobey; and each king misconstrues both his own role as a sovereign and the role of the rebel. When informed by the blind prophet Tiresias that religious forces are against him, each king claims that the priest has been corrupted. It is here, however, that their similarities come to an end: while Creon sees the havoc he has wreaked and tries to amend his mistakes, Oedipus refuses to listen to anyone. (The above text comes almost directly from David Grene's introduction to Sophocles I, University of Chicago Press, 1954.)

=== Irony ===
Sophocles uses dramatic irony to present the downfall of Oedipus. At the beginning of the story, Oedipus is portrayed as "self-confident, intelligent and strong willed." By the end, it is within these traits that he finds his demise.

One of the most significant instances of irony in this tragedy is when Tiresias hints to Oedipus what he has done; that he has slain his own father and married his own mother (lines 457–60):

To his children he will discover that he is both brother and father.
To the woman who gave birth to him he is son and husband and to his father, both, a sharer of his bed and his murderer.
Go into your palace then, king Oedipus, and think about these things and if you find me a liar then you can truly say I know nothing of prophecies.

The audience knows the truth and what would be the fate of Oedipus. Oedipus, on the other hand, chooses to deny the reality that has confronted him. He ignores the word of Tiresias and continues on his journey to find the supposed killer. His search for a murderer is yet another instance of irony. Oedipus, determined to find the one responsible for King Laius's death, announces to his people (lines 247–53):

I hereby call down curses on this killer ...
that horribly, as he is horrible,
he may drag out his wretched unblessed days.
This too I pray: Though he be of my house,
if I learn of it, and let him still remain,
may I receive the curse I have laid on others.

This is ironic as Oedipus is, as he discovers, the slayer of Laius, and the curse he wishes upon the killer, he has actually wished upon himself. Glassberg (2017) explains that "Oedipus has clearly missed the mark. He is unaware that he is the one polluting agent he seeks to punish. He has inadequate knowledge."

=== Sight and blindness ===
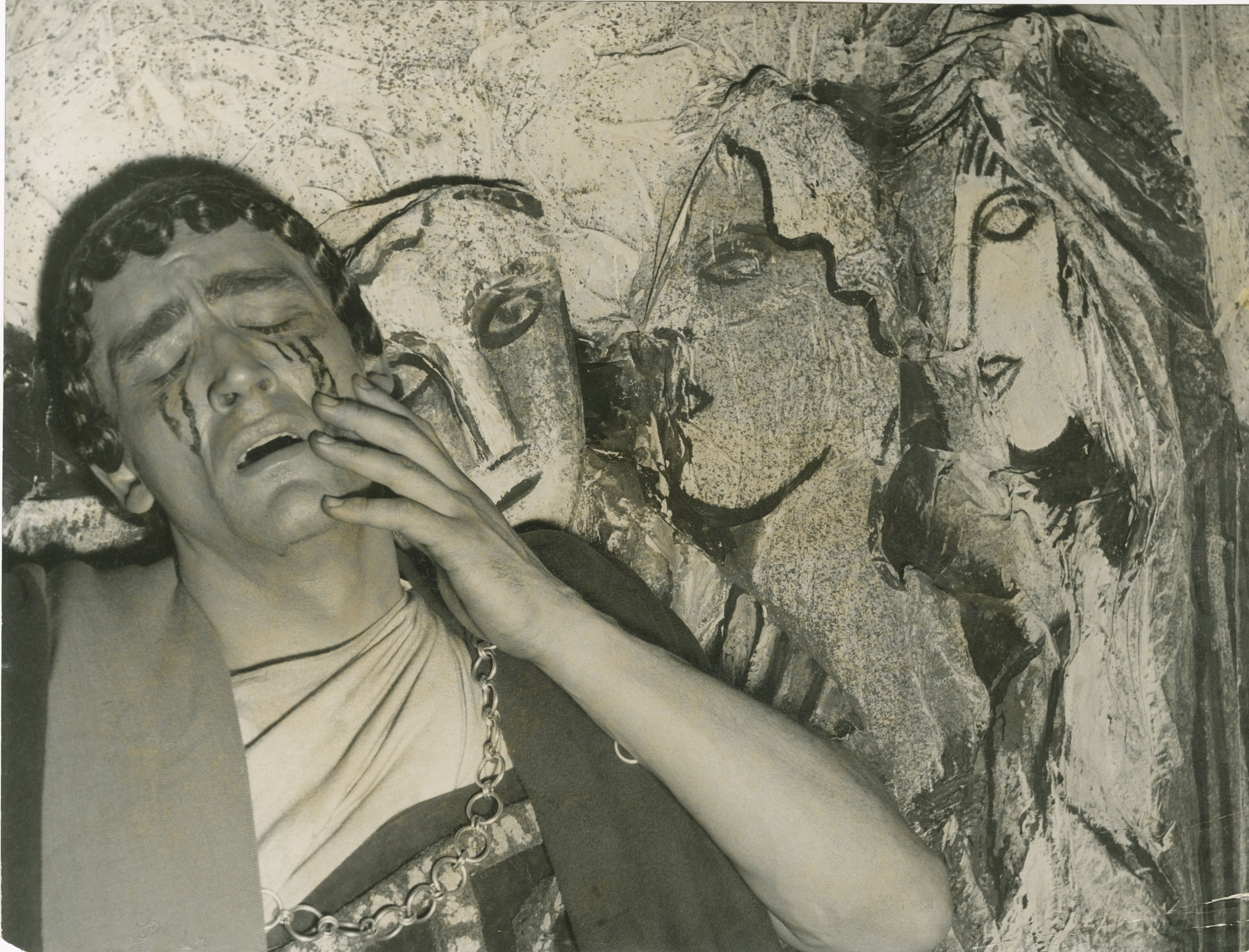
Vittorio Gassman as Oedipus

Literal and metaphorical references to eyesight appear throughout Oedipus Rex. Clear vision serves as a metaphor for insight and knowledge, yet the clear-eyed Oedipus is blind to the truth about his origins and inadvertent crimes. The prophet Tiresias, on the other hand, although literally blind, "sees" the truth and relays what is revealed to him. Only after Oedipus gouges out his own eyes, physically blinding himself, does he gain prophetic ability, as exhibited in Oedipus at Colonus. It is deliberately ironic that the "seer" can "see" better than Oedipus, despite being blind. Tiresias, in anger, expresses such (lines 495–500):

Since you have chosen to insult my blindness—
you have your eyesight, and you do not see
how miserable you are, or where you live,
or who it is who shares your household.
Do you know the family you come from?
Without your knowledge you've become
the enemy of your own kindred

=== Tyranny ===
Oedipus switches back and forth calling Laius a tyrant (lines 128–129) and a king (lines 254–256) throughout the duration of the play. This is done as a way to make Laius his equal in terms of ruling. Laius was a legitimate king, whereas Oedipus had no legitimate claim to rule. Oedipus's claims that Laius is a tyrant hint at his own insecurities of being a tyrant.

The tyranny brought down the way it was, what

"troubles" could keep you from looking into it?

For even if a god weren't forcing this on you

you shouldn't leave it festering so, and this

the case of a noble man, your murdered king.

== Sigmund Freud ==
Sigmund Freud wrote a notable passage in Interpretation of Dreams regarding the destiny of Oedipus, as well as the Oedipus complex. He analyzes why this play, Oedipus Rex, written in Ancient Greece, is so effective even to a modern audience:

"His destiny moves us only because it might have been ours—because the oracle laid the same curse upon us before our birth as upon him. It is the fate of all of us, perhaps, to direct our first sexual impulse towards our mother and our first hatred and our first murderous wish against our father. Our dreams convince us that this is so."

Freud goes on to indicate, however, that the "primordial urges and fears" that are his concern are not found primarily in the play by Sophocles, but exist in the myth the play is based on. He refers to Oedipus Rex as a "further modification of the legend", one that originates in a "misconceived secondary revision of the material, which has sought to exploit it for theological purposes".

In her article, "Oedipal Textuality: Reading Freud's Reading of Oedipus", Cynthia Chase explains Oedipus Rex as a story of psychoanalysis in relation to the riddles in the story and Oedipus trying to uncover his truth.

=== Parsifal ===
The Parsifal story is the "reverse" of the Oedipus myth (cf. Claude Lévi-Strauss).

== Adaptations ==
=== Film adaptations ===
The first English-language adaption, Oedipus Rex (1957), was directed by Tyrone Guthrie and starred Douglas Campbell as Oedipus. In this version, the entire play is performed by the cast in masks (Greek: prosopon), as actors did in ancient Greek theatre.

The second English-language film version, Oedipus the King (1968), was directed by Philip Saville and filmed in Greece. Unlike Guthrie's film, this version shows the actors' faces, as well as boasting an all-star cast, including Christopher Plummer as Oedipus; Lilli Palmer as Jocasta; Orson Welles as Tiresias; Richard Johnson as Creon; Roger Livesey as the Shepherd; and Donald Sutherland as the Leading Member of the Chorus. Sutherland's voice, however, was dubbed by another actor. The film went a step further than the play by actually showing, in flashback, the murder of Laius (portrayed by Friedrich Ledebur). It also shows Oedipus and Jocasta in bed together, making love. Though released in 1968, this film was not seen in Europe or the US until the 1970s and 1980s after legal release and distribution rights were granted to video and television.

Singaporean director Hussein Haniff made an adaptation of the play with the Malay language period drama Kalong Kenangan (lit. 'Necklace of Memory') for Keris Film Production in 1964.

In Italy, Pier Paolo Pasolini directed Edipo Re (1967), a modern interpretation of the play.

Toshio Matsumoto's film, Funeral Parade of Roses (1969), is a loose adaptation of the play and an important work of the Japanese New Wave.

In Colombia, writer Gabriel García Márquez adapted the story in Edipo Alcalde, bringing it to the real-world situation of Colombia at the time.

The Nigerian film The Gods are STILL not to Blame (2012) was produced by Funke Fayoyin, premiering at Silverbird Galleria in Lagos.

Park Chan-wook's South Korean film, Oldboy (2003), was inspired by the play while making several notable changes to allow it to work in a modern South-Korean setting. The film even alters the iconic twist, causing many American critics to overlook the connection. It received widespread acclaim, and is seen in South Korea as the definitive adaptation.

=== Stage adaptations ===
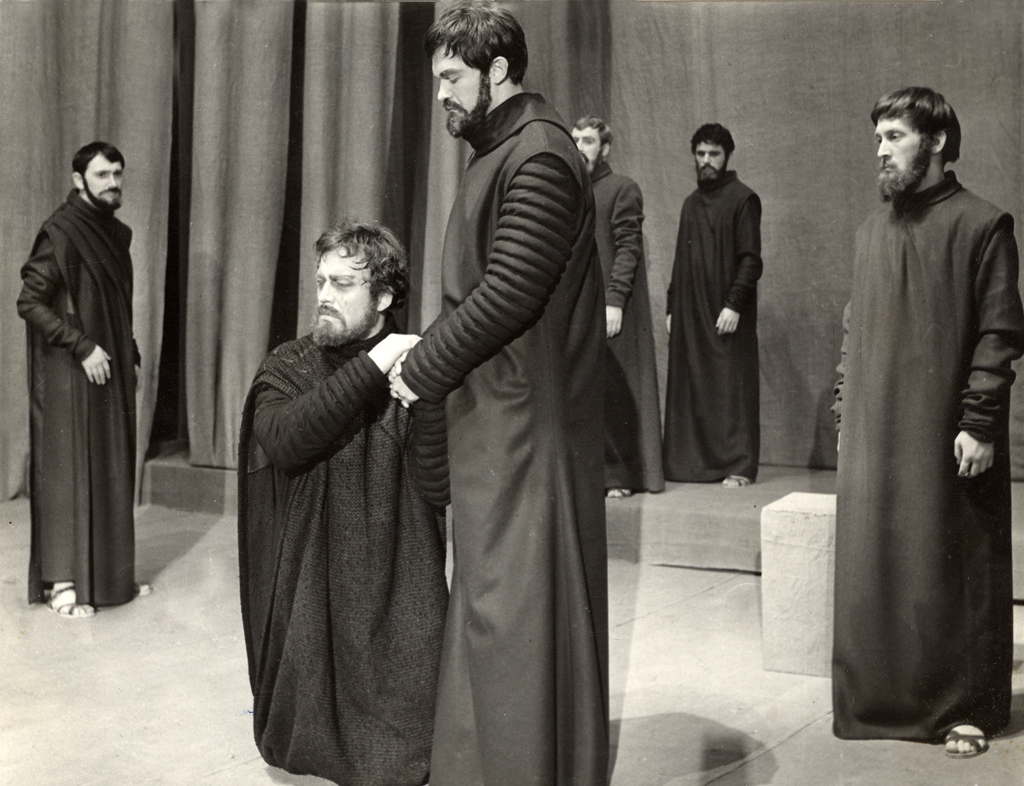
Play by the Celje Slovene People's Theatre in 1968

The composer Igor Stravinsky wrote the opera-oratorio Oedipus Rex, which premiered in 1927 at the Théâtre Sarah Bernhardt, Paris. It is scored for orchestra, speaker, soloists, and male chorus. The libretto, based on Sophocles's tragedy, was written by Jean Cocteau in French and then translated by Abbé Jean Daniélou into Latin. The narration, however, is performed in the language of the audience. The work was written towards the beginning of Stravinsky's neoclassical period and is considered one of the finest works from this phase of the composer's career. He had considered setting the language of the work in Ancient Greek, but decided ultimately on Latin, as "a medium not dead but turned to stone".

Carl Orff wrote Oedipus der Tyrann (1959), an opera consisting of a prologue and five acts, to Friedrich Hölderlin's 1804 German translation of Sophocles' text.

Nigerian writer Ola Rotimi adapted Oedipus Rex into a 1968 play and novel, titling it The Gods Are Not to Blame.

Dancer and choreographer Martha Graham adapted Oedipus Rex into a short ballet entitled Night Journey, premiering in 1947. In this adaptation, the action focuses not on Oedipus, but upon Jocasta, reflecting on her strange destiny.

Composer Wolfgang Rihm used the play as a basis for his 1987 opera Oedipus, also writing the libretto in German which includes related texts by Friedrich Nietzsche and Heiner Müller. It premiered at the Deutsche Oper Berlin, directed by Götz Friedrich in a performance broadcast live.

Robert Icke's adaptation Oedipus premiered at Toneelgroep Amsterdam in 2018, before an English-language transfer in 2025 to the Wyndham's Theatre, West End, and to Studio 54, Broadway, starring Mark Strong and Lesley Manville.

=== TV/radio adaptations ===
Don Taylor's 1986 translation/adaptation of Oedipus Rex using the English title Oedipus the King formed part of the BBC's Theban Plays trilogy. It starred Michael Pennington as Oedipus, with Claire Bloom as Jocasta, John Gielgud as Tiresias, and John Shrapnel as Creon. The actors performed in modern dress.

In 1977, CBS Radio Mystery Theater broadcast a version of the story called "So Shall Ye Reap", set in 1851 in what was then the U.S. Territory of New Mexico.

In 1987, Brazilian TV Globo broadcast the soap opera Mandala, a loose adaptation set in modern times starring Vera Fischer as Jocasta.

In 2017, BBC Radio 3 broadcast a production of Anthony Burgess' translation of the play with Christopher Eccleston as Oedipus and Fiona Shaw as Tiresias/Second Elder. John Shrapnel, who starred as Creon in the 1986 BBC television version, played the First Elder.

Other television portrayals of Oedipus include that of Christopher Plummer (1957), Ian Holm (1972), and Patrick Stewart (1977).

=== Parodies ===
Peter Schickele parodies both the story of Oedipus Rex and the music of Stravinsky's opera-oratorio of the same name in Oedipus Tex, a Western-themed oratorio purportedly written by P. D. Q. Bach. It was released in 1990 on the album Oedipus Tex and Other Choral Calamities.

Chrysanthos Mentis Bostantzoglou makes a parody of the tragedy in his comedy Medea (1993).

In episode ten of the second season of the Australian satirical comedy show CNNNN, a short animation in the style of a Disney movie trailer, complete with jaunty music provided by Andrew Hansen, parodies Oedipus Rex. Apart from being advertised as "fun for the whole family", the parody is also mentioned at other times during that same episode, such as in a satirical advertisement in which orphans are offered a free "Oedipus Rex ashes urn" as a promotional offer after losing a relative.

John Barth's novel Giles Goat-Boy contains a forty-page parody of the full text of Oedipus Rex called Taliped Decanus.

Tom Lehrer wrote and performed a comedic song based upon Oedipus Rex in 1959.

Bo Burnham references Oedipus in songs "Words Words Words" and "Rant", both part of his album, Words Words Words.

In 1968, Argentinean comedy-musical group Les Luthiers composed a parody of the play titled "Epopeya de Edipo de Tebas" (Oedipus of Thebes' Epos).

== Editions ==
=== English translations ===
- Lewis Theobald, 1715 – verse full text
- Thomas Francklin, 1759 – verse full text
- Theodore Alois Buckley, 1849 – prose full text
- Edward H. Plumptre, 1865 – verse (full text at Wikisource, rev. edition of 1878)
- Lewis Campbell, 1883 – verse (full text at Wikisource, rev. edition of 1906)
- Sir George Young, 1888 – verse
- Richard C. Jebb, 1904 – prose (full text at Wikisource)
- Arthur Way, 1909 – verse full text
- Gilbert Murray, 1911 – verse (full text, with audio, at Wikisource)
- Francis Storr, 1912 – verse: full text
- W. B. Yeats, 1928 – mixed prose and verse (full text, with music, at Wikisource)
- David Grene, 1942 (revised ed. 1991) – verse
- E. F. Watling, 1947 – verse
- Dudley Fitts and Robert Fitzgerald, 1949 – verse
- F. L. Lucas, 1954 – verse
- Theodore Howard Banks, 1956 – verse
- Albert Cook, 1957 – verse
- Bernard Knox, 1959 – prose
- H. D. F. Kitto, 1962 – verse
- Luci Berkowitz and Theodore F. Brunner, 1970 – prose
- Anthony Burgess, 1972 – prose and verse
- Stephen Berg and Diskin Clay, 1978 – verse
- Robert Bagg, 1982 (revised ed. 2004) – verse
- Robert Fagles, 1984, The Three Theban Plays: Antigone; Oedipus the King; Oedipus at Colonus. Penguin classics. ISBN 9781101042694
- Don Taylor, 1986 – prose
- Nick Bartel, 1999 – verse: abridged text
- Kenneth McLeish, 2001 – verse
- Ian Johnston, 2004 – verse: full text
- George Theodoridis, 2005 – prose: full text
- J. E. Thomas, 2006 – verse
- Ian C. Johnston, 2007 – verse: full text
- David Mulroy, 2011 – verse
- Rachel Pollack and David Vine, 2011 – verse
- Frank Nisetich, 2016 – verse
- David Kovacs, 2020 – verse. OUP Oxford. ISBN 978-0198854838
- Bryan Doerries, 2021 – verse. ISBN 0593314956
- Emily Wilson, 2022 – verse

== See also ==
- Incest
- Lille Stesichorus, a papyrus fragment of an alternative version by the lyric poet Stesichorus
- Oedipus
- Oedipus complex
- Patricide
