= Our Husband Has Gone Mad Again =

1999 play by Olawale Gladstone

- Author: Ola Rotimi
- Language: English
- Genre: Comedy
- Publisher: University Press Plc
- Publication date: December 29, 1999
- Publication place: Nigeria
- ISBN: 978-9-78154-003-5

Our Husband Has Gone Mad Again is a play by Nigerian playwright Ola Rotimi. The play centers around the entry of a former military Major, Lejoka-Brown, into politics in contemporary Africa.

== Synopsis ==
The play revolves around a former military Major, named Lekoja-Brown, who enters into politics in contemporary Africa. Lekoja-Brown struggles in the political world which he doesn't fully understand while being driven more by vanity than patroitism. His struggles in the political world bring about comic results throughout the play.

Lekoja-Brown's problems worsen at the arrival of his American wife, who finds out he has married two more women while she was away. As the Major struggles with his political and marital challenges, his story captures the prevalent issues found in the political landscape and highlights themes such as ambition, opportunism, and the absurdity of politics.

== Background ==
The story is set in contemporary Africa and follows a former military Major who decides to pursue a career in politics. Before the play begins, the Major has married a Kenyan woman named Liza, who has been studying medicine in the US. Liza is now on her way to live with him in Nigeria, unaware of his two other wives. The first wife is much older, was his late brother's wife, whom he married according to Muslim custom. The second wife is much younger and was married to him as a political strategy. When Liza arrives and discovers the other wives, the situation takes unexpected turns. Liza forms alliances with the other wives, helping the older one learn about supply and demand and encouraging the younger one to oppose the Major in his election campaign.

== Characters ==
- Rahman Taslin Lejoka is the main character and a retired army officer. He is a comical figure in the play and he represents politicians in Nigeria who are new but similar to the past. He gets involved in politics and marries Sikira for material and personal gain.
- Liza is a qualified medical doctor from the United States, married to Lejoka in Congo. After her studies in the United States, she returns and finds she cannot accept a polygamous marriage, so she starts causing trouble. And eventually leaves the marriage.
- Mama Rashida is Lejoka's first and main wife, whom he married by custom from his late elder brother. She represents submissive women who agree with whatever their husband says.
- Musa Osagie is a member of the national party who helped Lejoka win the election.
- Polycarp is the loyal but illiterate domestic help in Lejoka's household.
- Sikira is the young, friendly daughter of Madam Ajamku, the leader of the market women union, and Lejoka's second wife. She eventually becomes the candidate for major's opposition party.
- Alhaji Mustafa is an older neighbor of Lejoka, and though he doesn't say a lot, he is a good neighbor. Whom house is later demolished.
