= Ola Rotimi =

Nigerian playwright (1938–2000)

- Born: Olawale Gladstone Emmanuel Rotimi; 13 April 1938; Sapele, British Nigeria
- Died: 18 August 2000 (aged 62)
- Education: Boston University (BFA); Yale University (MFA)
- Occupations: Playwright, director. head of department of creative arts at the University of Port Harcourt, lecturer at Obafemi Awolowo University, Nigeria; has also served as visiting professor, playwright, and director in Germany and Italy, as well as at DePauw University and Wabash College.
- Writing career
- Period: 1938–2000
- Notable works: The Gods Are Not to Blame, Ovonramwen Nogbaisi, and The Epilogue

Olawale Gladstone Emmanuel Rotimi, best known as Ola Rotimi (13 April 1938 – 18 August 2000), was one of Nigeria's leading playwrights and theatre directors. He has been called "a complete man of the theatre – an actor, director, choreographer and designer – who created performance spaces, influenced by traditional architectural forms."

== Biography ==
=== Early life ===
Rotimi was the son of Samuel Gladstone Enitan Rotimi a Yoruba steam-launch engineer (a successful director and producer of amateur theatricals) and Dorcas Adolae Oruene Addo an Ijaw drama enthusiast. He was born in Sapele, Nigeria; cultural diversity was a recurring theme in his work. He attended St. Cyprian's School in Port Harcourt from 1945 to 1949, St Jude's School, Lagos, from 1951 to 1952 and the Methodist Boys' High School, Lagos, before travelling to the United States in 1959 to study at Boston University, where he obtained a BA in fine arts. In 1965, he married Hazel Mae Gaudreau; Hazel also studied at Boston University, where she majored in opera, voice and music education. In 1966 he obtained an MA from Yale School of Drama, (Note: He received professional training as a dramatist at Yale under John Gassner, one of America's distinguished dramatic critics, and Jack Landau, a professional New York director. Dictionary of Literary Biography: Olawale Gladstone Emmanuel Rotimi (p. 2)) where he earned the distinction of being a Rockefeller Foundation scholar in playwriting and dramatic literature. (Note: His graduate project-play was declared "Yale University's Student Play of the Year".Olarotimi Foundation)

Upon returning to Nigeria in the 1960s, Rotimi joined the faculty of the University of Ife (now Obafemi Awolowo University), where he founded the Ori Olokun Acting Company, a theatre troupe that became influential in experimental Nigerian stage production.

He later taught at the University of Port Harcourt, where several of his later works premiered. During the 1990s, Rotimi also taught in the Caribbean and the United States, including at Macalester College, before returning to Nigeria in 2000.

=== Theatrical career ===
Rotimi often examined Nigeria's history and local traditions in his works. His first plays, To Stir the God of Iron (produced 1963) and Our Husband Has Gone Mad Again (produced 1966; published 1977), were staged at the drama schools of Boston University and Yale, respectively.

=== Later years ===
Upon returning to Nigeria in the 1960s, Rotimi taught at the University of Ife (now Obafemi Awolowo University), where he founded the Ori Olokun Acting Company, and Port Harcourt. Owing, in part, to political conditions in Nigeria, Rotimi spent much of the 1990s living in the Caribbean and the United States, where he taught at Macalester College in St. Paul, Minnesota. In 2000 he returned to Ile-Ife where he lectured in Obafemi Awolowo University till his demise. Hazel (his wife) died in May 2000, only a couple of months before Rotimi's death.

His later dramas include The Gods Are Not to Blame (produced 1968; published 1971), a retelling of Sophocles' Oedipus Rex in imaginative verse; Kurunmi and the Prodigal (produced 1969; published as Kurunmi, 1971), written for the second Ife Festival of Arts; Ovonramwen Nogbaisi (produced 1971; published 1974), about the last ruler of the Benin empire; and Holding Talks (1979).

Later plays, such as If: A Tragedy of the Ruled (1983) and Hopes of the Living Dead (1988), premiered at the University of Port Harcourt and was a common play in Obafemi Awolowo University Drama Department. The radio play Everyone His/Her Own Problem, was broadcast in 1987. His book African Dramatic Literature: To Be or to Become? was published in 1991.

Rotimi, a patriot who shunned the attraction of the West and Europe and returned home to contribute his own quota to nation building.

His dream of directing a play of 5000 cast members materialised at the Amphi Africa Theater when he was being put to rest as the crowd was drawn to a manuscript of the day's program outline. People made dramatic entry and exit to the stage around his casket with the man turning his casket.

Rotimi spent the second half of his last creative decade reworking two of his plays – Man Talk, Woman Talk and also Tororo, Tororo, Roro – and the result, unpublished at the time of his death in 2000, have now been published under the title The Epilogue. were probably meant as an epilogue to both Rotimi's theatrical and comic careers, which span the entire spectrum of his career.

It is comical and the language used is a version of "Nigerian English" (for example: "Se you get?" "I called God on him").

The works are also a social satire and this publication will spur renewed interest in his satires. Rotimi is sure to be remembered as a model in the literary genre whose views have shaped the conduct of the theatre and whose plays have demonstrated the power of drama to shape the thinking of the society and attempted to solve some of the problems encountered in everyday living.

== Plays ==
- (1963) To Stir the God of Iron
- (1966) Our Husband Has Gone Mad Again—depicts the cocoa farmer and businessman Lejoka-Brown as a self-seeking, opportunistic leader who could make better contributions to his country outside of the political arena.
- (1968) The Gods Are Not to Blame—an adaptation of the Greek classic Oedipus Rex; the main character gets trapped by pride, ignorance and the caprices of the divinities.
- (1969) Kurunmi
- (1970) Holding Talks
- (1971) Ovonramven Nogbaisi—the title character simply luxuriates in the grandeur of his office. Although he is a custodian of culture who inspires people, he does not actively participate in their struggles.
- (1973) Grip Am
- (1973) Invitation into Madness
- (1977) Akassa Youmi*
- (1979) If: A Tragedy of the Ruled—in If, the young firebrand Hamidu is nowhere to be found when a real commitment is required.
- (1985) Hopes of The Living Dead—Rotimi here depicts a different kind of leader: a selfless, result-oriented, committed leadership complemented by a followership that believes in the good of the generality of its members through the application of itself to the cause that is beneficial.
- When the Criminals Become Judges

The Epilogue: Two unpublished plays of Ola Rotimi

- Man Talk, Woman Talk

Man Talk, Woman Talk is a comedy play. He makes use of wry humour to seek a level playing ground for resolution of the biases men and women nurse about one another and which affect mutual co-existence of the two. The scene is a court though devoid of the usual technicalities of court rooms. Instead of legal jargon, there is humour, arguments and counter arguments. What the author arrives at is not to prove which gender is superior but to show the complementary roles of men and women. There is a great deal of wit in the work and the setting here is the university environment where the youthful contenders are idealistic.

- Tororo, Tororo, Roro

Tororo, Tororo, Roro is a coincidental meeting of two fellows from Man Talk, Woman Talk, Tunji Oginni and Philomena James. Both run Hotel Kilimanjaro with different motives and a chance meeting between them elicits lessons as both share each other's problems.

=== Performances ===
First performed in Nigeria in 1968, The Gods Are Not to Blame was produced at the Arcola Theatre in Hackney, London, in 2005. Femi Elufowoju Jr had his first theatre experience in 1975, at the age of 11, when he saw a revival of this very play, performed in a reconstructed Greek amphitheatre at a university campus in Ife; and brought it to the UK shores as a British leading theatre director under the company name Tiata Fahodzi

His last production was a staging of Man Talk, Woman Talk at the French Institute in Lagos, Nigeria. He also produced Tororo Tororo roro, a play of the Absurd, as a convocation play.

== Themes and Style ==
Ola Rotimi's dramatic works are noted for their fusion of indigenous African performance traditions with Western dramatic structures. Literary scholars have observed that his plays frequently combine elements of Greek tragedy, Yoruba oral traditions, music, dance, and ritual performance to create a distinctive theatrical style.

A recurring feature of Rotimi's drama is the reinterpretation of historical and mythological narratives as commentary on contemporary Nigerian society. His works often address leadership failure, corruption, ethnic tensions, social injustice, and the abuse of political power.

Rotimi also became known for his creative use of language, often blending Standard English with Nigerian Pidgin and indigenous expressions to reflect social class, ethnicity, and cultural identity within his plays.

== Style ==
For Man Talk, Woman Talk, directorial approach must have fluidity which will allow for creativity of the actors. The technicalities of the stage should be carefully applied in such a way that they will kill expected boredom associated with court scenes for if not done, the whole dramatic in the act will be flattened out. It might do the play a favour if it is given the kind of approach Ola Rotimi himself used in the directing of the premiere of the play. It is the technique that allows a kind of participatory interaction; the one that accommodates the audience contribution.

== Legacy ==
Ola Rotimi is widely regarded as one of the foremost dramatists of post-independence African theatre. His plays remain among the most studied dramatic texts in African literature and are frequently taught in courses on theatre, literature, and postcolonial studies.

His reinterpretation of classical tragic structures within African historical and cultural contexts contributed significantly to the development of modern Nigerian drama. Works such as The Gods Are Not to Blame, Kurunmi, and Ovonramwen Nogbaisi continue to influence playwrights, theatre practitioners, and literary scholars across Africa and beyond.

== Awards ==
Rotimi was awarded two Fulbright Scholarships

== List of works ==
Books that contain his significant contributions (see notes for more information) are marked with a percentage(%); Conference publications are marked with an asterisk (*); thesis or dissertations are marked with a dagger (†) below.

Plays and literature

- Kurunmi (Note: Kurumi: An Historical Tragedy, Ibadan, Nigeria: Oxford University Press, 1971. ISBN 0-19-646040-9)
- The Gods Are Not to Blame (Note: The Gods Are Not to Blame (Three Crowns) (paperback), London: Oxford University Press, 1971. ISBN 0-19-211358-5)
- Ovọnramwẹn Nọgbaisi (Note: Ovọnramwẹn Nọgbaisi: An Historical Tragedy in English, Benin City, Nigeria: Ethiope Pub. Corp., 1974. ISBN 0-19-575233-3)
- Our Husband Has Gone Mad Again (Note: Our Husband Has Gone Mad Again (paperback), University Press PLC, Nigeria, 1977, 1999. ISBN 978-154-003-6)
- Holding Talks (Note: Holding Talks: An absurdist drama, Ibadan, Nigeria: Oxford University Press, 1979. ISBN 978-154-497-X)
- If: A Tragedy of the ruled (Note: If: A Tragedy of the Ruled (paperback), Ibadan, Nigeria: Heinemann Educational Books, 1983. ISBN 978-129-140-0)
- Understanding "The Gods Are Not to Blame" (Note: Ola Rotimi & C. Maduka: A detailed interview with Ola Rotimi on his award-winning tragedy "The Gods Are Not to Blame", Kurunmi Adventures, Lagos, 1984. ISBN 978-2321-42-7)
- Hopes of the Living Dead (Note: Hopes of the Living Dead: a drama of struggle, Ibadan, Nigeria: Spectrum Books, 1988. ISBN 978-2460-13-3)
- Viandanti della storia (Note: Series II lato dell'ombra. 24: Chinua Achebe (Author); Itala Vivan; Ola Rotimi & Franca Cavagnoli (Author), Lavoro, Roma, 1991.)%
- African Dramatic Literature
- Playwriting and Directing in Nigeria
- The Epilogue (Note: Effiok Bassey Uwatt (editor), The Epilogue: Two Unpublished Plays of Ola Rotimi, (Man Talk, Woman Talk & Tororo, Tororo Ro-ro), Lagos: Apex Books, 2007. ISBN 978-48045-7-3)

Books, essays and political commentary

Books

- A Dictionary of Nigerian Pidgin English: with an introductory survey of the history, linguistics and socio-literary functions
- Introduction to Nigerian literature (Note: Bruce King, Introduction to Nigerian Literature (hardcover), New York: Africana Pub. Corp., 1972, 1971. ISBN 0-8419-0111-2. Rotimi's contribution was contextual material relating to traditional Nigerian drama.)%
- The Living Culture of Nigeria (Note: Saburi O. Biobaku, The Living Culture of Nigeria, Lagos: T. Nelson Publishers, 1976. ISBN 0-17-544201-0)%
- A translation of the play "The Gods Are Not to Blame" into Setswana (Note: Thandie Lerato Pilane, Ola Rotimi, University of Botswana: Thesis (B.A.) University of Botswana, Gaborone, 1979.)†
- Statement towards August '83- (Note: Statements towards August '83, Kurunmi Adventures, Lagos, 1983. ISBN 978-2321-41-9)
- The Masquerade in Nigerian history and culture (Note: Nwanna Nzewunwa (chief editor): sponsored by the University of Port Harcourt, Port Harcourt, Nigeria, 1980 (Conference papers). Rotimi's contribution was an 18-page paper sub-titled "Through whom the spirits breathe".)*%
- An interview (1975) with Ola Rotimi, senior research fellow, Institute of African Studies, University of Ifẹ, Ile Ifẹ (Note: Ola Rotimi & Dapọ Adelugba (editor): LACE occasional publications v. 1, no. 3, Dept. of Theatre Arts, University of Ibadan, Ibadan, Nigeria, 1984.)
- Diversity of Creativity in Nigeria*
- African Theatre in Performance%
- Akassa you mi
- Issues in African Theatre

Articles

- "Conversation with Ola Rotimi"
- "How the kingfisher learned fear"
- "Review of: Kiabàrà: Journal of the Humanities 1" (June 1978)
- "Through whom the spirits breathe"
- "The trials of African literature"
- "Everyone his/her own problem"
- "No direction home"

Archival material and ebooks

Archival material

- Papers (Note: Organized by the Institute of African Studies, University of Ife "in collaboration with the Dept. of English (ed Conference papers). Rotimi's contribution was a 13-page paper sub-titled "Trends in the Nigerian drama")*
- African Papers, 1963, 1968–1989
- Gbe'ku De:pièce en 1 acte

ebooks

- Initiation into Madness
- Our Husband Has Gone Mad Again
- If
- Holding Talks
- Hopes of the Living Dead
- Grip Am
- Akassa you mi
- Kurunmi
- Ovonramwen Nogbaisi

In 2015 Society of Young Nigerian Writers under the leadership of Wole Adedoyin founded Ola Rotimi Literary Society(www.olarotimiliterarysociety.blogspot.com) aim at promoting and reading the works of Ola Rotimi.

== See also ==
- Lace Occasional Publications, Vol.1, No.3 (23 June 1984), Theatre Department, University of Ibadan, Nigeria

== Relevant literature ==
- Adegbite, Wale. "Pragmatic tactics in diplomatic communication: a case study of Ola Rotimi's Ovonramwen Nogbaisi." Journal of pragmatics 37, no. 9 (2005): 1457-1480.
- ANIGBOGU, Ngozi Chidinma, and Festus C. AHIZIH. "LANGUAGE USE IN OLA ROTIMI’S'THE GODS ARE NOT TO BLAME'." Socialscientia: Journal of Social Sciences and Humanities 5, no. 1 (2020): 28-41.
- Apuke, Oberiri Destiny. "Thematic Analysis/Review of Ola Rotimi’s The Gods Are Not to Blame." Studies in Literature and Language 13, no. 5 (2016): 11-13.
- Jegede, Olusegun Oladele and Eniola Omotayo Osoba. 2019. The Pragmatics of Proverbs in Ola Rotimi’s Kurunmi. Bulletin of Advanced English Studies 3(2)2019, 92-100. Open access
- Monye, Ambrose. "The Use of Proverbs in Ola Rotimi's' The Gods are not to Blame'." Proverbium 12 (1995): 251-61.
- Nutsukpo, Margaret Fafa. "Beyond Adaptation: The Representation of Women in Ola Rotimi's The Gods Are Not To Blame." International Journal 9, no. 2 (2019).
- Odebunmi, Akin. "Pragmatic functions of crisis-motivated proverbs in Ola Rotimi's The Gods Are Not to Blame." (2008). Linguistik Online 33, 1/08.
- Ola, V. U. "The Concept of Tragedy in Ola Rotimi's The Gods Are Not to Blame." Okike 22 (1982): 23-31.
- Owoeye, Omolara Kikelomo, and Samuel Ayodele Dada. "A demographic analysis of proverbs in Rotimis historical tragedies." US-China Foreign Language 10 (2012): 1599-1607.
- Simpson, Michael. "The Curse of the Canon: Ola Rotimi’s The Gods Are Not To Blame." Classics in Post-Colonial Worlds (2007): 86ff
- Zakariyah, Moshood. 2016. A Pragmatic Analysis of Proverbs in Selected Works of Ola Rotimi. Ahmadu Bello University, Zaria, Nigeria: Doctoral dissertation.
