= Akin "Ak" Reyes =

American radio personality (born 1979)

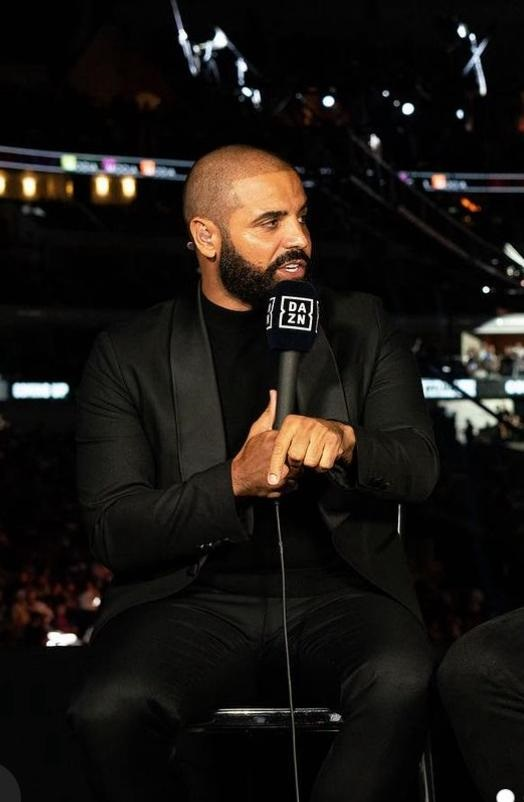
- Reyes Broadcasting for DAZN
- Born: November 10, 1979 (age 46); Brooklyn, New York, U.S.
- Occupations: TV sports broadcaster and host
- Years active: 2009–present
- Employer: DAZN
- Known for: The Ak and Barak Show; Da Pull Up; The DAZN Boxing Show

Akin "Ak" Reyes, better known as Ak (born November 10, 1979), is a TV sports broadcaster. He is well known for his presence on DAZN, a global live and on-demand sports streaming platform. Reyes was the lead host of The DAZN Boxing Show and Da Pull Up, aired on DAZN, with his co-host, Kamal Barak Bess.

Reyes has interviewed some of the biggest names in and around boxing, including Anthony Joshua, Tyson Fury, Canelo Álvarez, Deontay Wilder, and Michael Buffer, and he has also interviewed several entertainers, including Charlamagne tha God, Tweet, 50 Cent, Brandy Norwood, Akon and Sheryl Underwood.

In 2024, OTX (Overtime Boxing), a platform for emerging boxers, streaming all fights on social media platforms and DAZN, signed Reyes to their company.

== Early life ==
Reyes is of Puerto Rican and St. Lucian descent, born and raised in Brooklyn, New York. He currently resides in New Jersey.

Reyes and his brother, Shamir Reyes, were introduced to boxing by their father; Reyes went on to have over 70 amateur fights as Shamir embarked on a professional boxing career, signed under Don King Promotions, which enabled Reyes to learn about the boxing business.

Whilst in his 20s, Reyes worked as a fashion model, an actor, and for the family business.

== Personal life ==
Reyes is a father of one child. His son, Taj Marley Reyes, is featured in campaigns for Nike, Gap, Zara, Levis, Target, Footlocker, and he walked in the 2020 Nike New York Fashion Week, tribute to the late Kobe Bryant.

== Career ==
=== 2009 ===
Reyes and his friend, Saleem 'Hitchcock' Thomas, hosted a radio show that was dedicated to Hip hop. However, Reyes, an avid fan of boxing, incorporated the sport into the show. The duo interviewed former undisputed welterweight boxing champion Zab Judah, which kickstarted Reyes' career in boxing journalism and broadcasting.

=== 2015 ===
Reyes and co-host, Barak, accepted the opportunity to host a show on SiriusXM called The Hype Men. The duo talked about boxing events, and included topics around pop culture.

=== 2016 ===
Reyes and his co-host were employed to host their own show, The Sweet Scientists, on Thisis50.com, a website platform owned by rapper, actor, director and producer, Curtis '50 Cent' Jackson.

=== 2018 ===
DAZN "picked up" The Sweet Scientist, with Reyes and his co-host maintaining their position on the show.

=== 2019 ===
Reyes and his co-host brought a show to DAZN called Da Pull Up. The duo pranks individuals who use social media platforms to 'troll' boxers. 'Ak and Barak' 'pull up' on the internet troll in a public setting, with the fighter they had disrespected online.

Reyes and Barak currently host their own show, The Ak and Barak Show, on SiriusXM and DAZN.

=== 2020 ===
The Ak and Barak Show is broadcast in more than 200 countries and territories, including the UK, following DAZN's delayed global launch on December 1.

=== 2021 ===
Reyes was the co-host at two pay-per-view Boxing events, headlined by Ryan Garcia & Luke Campbell in January, and Saúl Canelo Àlvarez & Anvi Yildirim in February.

In April, Reyes announced the end of his contract with SiriusXM; however, his relationship with DAZN continued. DAZN created a new show, The DAZN Boxing Show, and secured 'Ak & Barak' as their lead hosts, bringing DAZN subscribers the latest news, opinions, star interviews, and all things Boxing, 5 days a week.

=== 2022 ===
Reyes hosted The DAZN Boxing Show, live, for the undercard of all the big boxing events, including Dmitry Bivol vs. Saul "Canelo" Alvarez, Ryan Garcia vs. Javier Fortuna, and Saul "Canelo" Alvarez vs. Gennadiy Golovkin, to name a few.

=== 2023 ===
Reyes continued to host The DAZN Boxing Show, live, for the undercard of boxing events, including Anthony Joshua vs. Jermaine Franklin, Gervonta Davis vs. Ryan Garcia, and Jake Paul vs. Nate Diaz.

=== 2024 ===
OTX announced they signed the accomplished boxing analyst as a commentator. Reyes' debut on the platform was March 29th.

Reyes did the voiceover for the Ryan Garcia vs Devin Haney '40 Days' episodes in the lead up to their pay-per-view fight.
