= Amichi =

Town in Anambra State, Nigeria

Amichi is a town in Anambra State, Nigeria. It is situated in Nnewi South. A historical site, it is regarded as where the Nigeria-Biafra War peace talks were made in 1970 when the war ended.

== History ==
Amichi borders Nnewi and was part of its lands during 15th-century migrations. It was part of the eastern protectorate during the colonisation of Nigeria. The Nigerian Civil War ended in 1970 following a peace accord signed on 13 January 1970 in the town between the Nigerian Armed Forces led by Olusegun Obasanjo and the Biafran Armed Forces led by Philip Effiong.

== Culture ==
=== New Yam festival ===
Amichi calls their New Yam Festival as Ikpo Ji. By their tradition, no native is allowed to eat or sell new yam until after the traditional monarch, Ezeana performs the rituals. The town takes three days for the festival.
