= Akin Akinsehinde =

Nigerian footballer

Personal information
- Full name: Akinwunmi Akinsehinde
- Date of birth: 14 April 1976 (age 50)
- Place of birth: Nigeria
- Height: 1.80 m (5 ft 11 in)
- Position: Forward

Senior career*
Years	Team	Apps	(Gls)
1991–1992	El-Kanemi Warriors		
1995–1996	First Vienna		
2002–2003	Sur		

International career
	Nigeria	8	(4)
- * Club domestic league appearances and goals

Akin Akinsehinde (born 14 April 1976) is a Nigerian football forward.

Akinsehinde won the 1991–92 Nigeria FA Cup with El-Kanemi Warriors F.C. He also played club football abroad with SK Rapid Wien, First Vienna FC, Akhaa Ahli Aley FC and Zamalek SC.

He appeared for Nigeria in 1993.
