= Akin Odebunmi =

Nigerian professor of pragmatics (born 1957)

- Born: Stephen Akinọlá Ọdébùnmi; 21 December 1967; Ogbomoso, Oyo State, Nigeria
- Education: University of Ilorin; Obafemi Awolowo University
- Occupations: Professor of English, University of Ibadan
- Spouse: Funmilola Olajide Odebunmi
- Writing career
- Notable work: Meaning in English: an introduction.

Akin Odebunmi is a Yoruba Nigerian Professor of Pragmatics and Discourse Analysis in the Department of English, University of Ibadan. Born on December 21, 1967, he is a widely traveled scholar in pragmatics and intercultural studies.

== Professional life ==
As an Alexander von Humboldt Foundation Georg Foster Experienced Research Fellow, he worked with Prof. Dr Peter Auer at the Freiburg Institute for Advanced Studies, an international research centre of excellence of the University of Freiburg, Germany between April 2010 and March 2011.He has also worked and is still working with the Peter Auer Research group at the Hermann Paul Centre of Linguistics, University of Freiburg. He is a member of professional bodies such as the English Scholars Association of Nigeria (ESAN) (formerly Nigerian English Studies Association - NESA), the Reading Association of Nigeria (RAN) and the International Pragmatics Association, Belgium. He had supervised several undergraduate and postgraduate research works while also serving as an external examiner in many universities within and outside Nigeria.

== Publications ==
His papers have appeared in Studia Anglica Posnaniensia, Pragmatics, Intercultural Pragmatics, Linguistik Online, California Linguistic Note, Marang, Anglogermanica, Africa: Revista Do Centro De Estudos Africanos, Nordic Journal of African Studies, Review of Cognitive Linguistics, Pragmatics and Society, Pragmatics and Cognition, Multilingua, Iranian Journal of Society, Culture and Language and Journal of Pragmatics.

He is the co-editor (with Arua E. Arua and Sailal Arimi) of Language, Gender and Politics: A Festschrift for Yisa Kehinde Yusuf, Language, Grammar and Applied Linguistics: Essays in Honour of Wale Osisanwo (with Ayo Osisanwo, Stella Ekpe and Helen Aduke), Face and Identity Construction in HIV/AIDS Discourse (with Joyce Mathangwane) and Language, Context and Society: A Festschrift for Wale Adegbite (with Kehinde A. Ayoola). Other co-edited works are; Style in Religious Communication in Nigeria (with Babajide Adeyemi), Perspectives on Media Discourse (with Rotimi Taiwo, and Akin Adetunji), Studies in Slang and Slogans (with Sola Babatunde, Akin Adetunji and Mahfouz Adedimeji), Language, Literature and Discourse (with Ayo Ogunsiji and Ayo Kehinde), The Sociology of English in Nigeria (with Akinmade Akande), English in the Theological Context (with Moses Alo), Essays on language, Communication and Literature in Africa (with Joyce Mathangwane), and Analysing Language and Humor in Online Discourse (with Rotimi Taiwo, and Akin Adetunji). He is also the author of Meaning in English:an introduction. He has contributed to the chapters of several books and journals while also writing book reviews. Over the years, Odebunmi has become an authority in non-native English usage in hospital interactions.

== Refereeing and review services ==
He has provided refereeing and reviewing services for Amsterdam-based Pragmatics and Society, Finland-based Nordic Journal of African Studies, Malaysia-based Journal of Modern Languages, US-based California Linguistic Notes and the International Journal of Society, Culture and Language.

== Research interests ==
His research interests lie in pragmatics, discourse analysis, semantics and medical discourse.

== Academic philosophy ==
He believes that discourses and texts, in large measure, offer meaning within a global and or local contextual network backgrounded by interactive beliefs, and translate as explicit or implicit communicative cues by the degree of inclusiveness or exclusiveness of participants in discourse situations.

== Abbronym ==
In a book edited by E. Adegbija and A. Ofuya titled English and Communication Skills for MESTA Students and published in 1996, Odebunmi coined the term 'abbronym'. An abbronym is a combination of abbreviation and acronym. Its lexematic variants are abbronymic, abbronymisation and abbronymically. It has since been widely used in Nigerian academic discourses.

== Administrative experience ==
Odebunmi served as the Sub-Dean (Postgraduate Studies) at the Faculty of Arts, University of Ibadan between August 2011 and 2014. He was in the Faculty's Publication Committee between 2007 and 2010. At the Department of English, UI, he has been Editor of the Ibadan Journal of English Studies since 2013 prior to which he was Deputy Editor between 2006 and 2010. He was also an ex-Postgraduate Co-coordinator, Member of the Departmental Finance Committee and Member of Local Organising Committee for International Conference on African Literature organised by the department. He served as Deputy Editor of Africa: Journal of Contemporary Issues between 2003 and 2007 and that of International Journal of African Culture and Ideas from 2004 to 2006. He also headed the Local Organising Committee for UI Faculty of Arts International Conference held in March, 2017.

== Personal life ==
Beyond academics, Odebunmi finds leisure in acting and drumming.
