= Mike Afolarin =

Nigerian actor

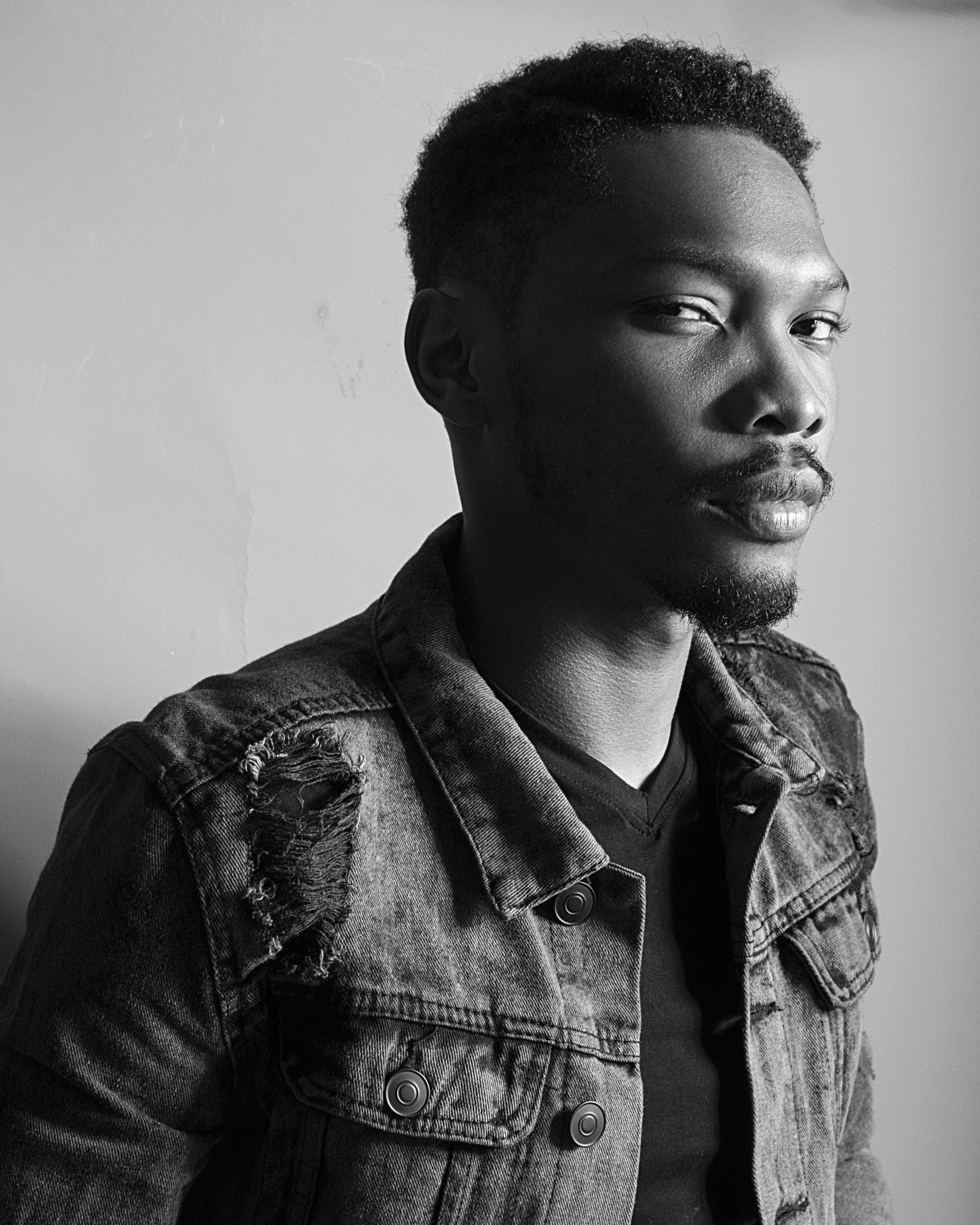
- Born: 1 September 1993 (age 32); Lagos State, Nigeria
- Citizenship: Nigerian
- Education: University of Lagos
- Occupations: Actor; filmmaker
- Years active: 2013–present
- Notable work: Far From Home, Kasala

Michael Oladapo Afolarin (born 1 September 1993) professionally known as Mike Afolarin is a Nigerian actor and photographer.

== Early life ==
Afolarin attended Federal Government College, Ijanikin, Lagos State, for his secondary education. He later earned a bachelor's degree in economics from the University of Lagos in 2016.

== Career ==
In 2013, Afolarin made his acting debut in a stage play, Magic Time while studying at the University of Lagos.

In 2018, Afolarin made his feature film debut in Kasala, directed by Emamode Edosio, alongside Chimezie Imo, Tomiwa Tegbe and Emeka Nwagbaraocha.

In 2022, Afolarin gained wider recognition for his lead role in the Netflix television series, Far From Home. In the same year, Afolarin portrayed Akinzo in the Funke Akindele and Tobi Makinde film Battle on Buka Street, released on 16 December 2022, which became the second-highest-grossing film at the Nigerian box office and set a one-day record by grossing ₦135 million, according to the Vanguard.

Afolarin has also appeared in Your Excellency (2019), Soólè (2021), The Wait (2021), Adire (2023), House of Ga'a (2024), Asiri Ade (2024), and Red Circle (2025).

== Filmography ==
Year	Title	Role	Notes/Ref
2017	Ajuwaya	Set Design	Directed by Tolu Lord Tanner
2018	Oyo State Investment Documentary	Aerial Cinematographer	Directed by Tolu Lord Tanner
2018	We Tha Boyz		Directed by Ema Edosio
2018	Kasala!	Chikodi	Directed by Ema Edosio
2018	Ajoche	Young Odumu	Directed by James Omokwe
2018	The Accused		Directed by Muyiwa Aluko
2018	An Interview Story	Francis	Directed by Mike Afolarin
2019	Fortunately Ridiculous	Nnamdi	Directed by Olutobi Odunubi
2019	Your Excellency	Tunde Ajadi	Directed by Funke Akindele
2019	Brethren	Kinto	Directed by Lanre Olupona
2019	Peace		Directed by Mike Afolarin
2019	Stuck In Deep Mud	Tamuno	Directed by Charles Obi Emere
2019	Blast	Cameo	Directed by Tosin Ibitoye
2019	The 3rd Rule		Directed by God'spower Okoh
2020	Inspector K	Idris	Directed by Abiola Sobo
2020	AARGH!	Femi	Directed by Kelvinmary Ndukwe
2020	Penance	Benjamin	Directed by Biodun Stephen
2021	The Olive (TV series)	David	Other casts are Theresa Edem, Joke Silva
2021	The Wait	Essien	Directed by Fiyin Gambo, Yemi Morafa
2021	Soole	Maxwell	Directed by Kayode Kasum
2022	Battle on Buka Street	Akinzo	Directed by Funke Akindele
2022	Far From Home	Ishaya Bello	Netflix series directed by Catherine Stewart and Kayode Kasum
2022	Miss Bamidele's Girls	Ezekiel	Directed by Desmond Elliot
2023	Adire	Deji	Directed by Adeoluwa Owu
2023	Anchor	Gideon	Directed by Ozioma B. Nwughala
2024	Ajosepo	Dapo	Directed by Kayode Kasum
2024	Water and Garri	Mide	Directed by Meji Alabi, other casts include Tiwa Savage, Jemima Osunde
2024	House of Ga'a	Oyemekun	Directed by Bolanle Austen-Peters
2024	Boy Trouble	Henry	Directed by Taiwo Shittu
2024	Bottom Line	Steve	Directed by Bryan Adekunle
2024	Asiri Ade		Directed by Adeoluwa Owu
2025	A Lagos Love Story	King Kator	Directed by Naz Onuzo

== Awards and nominations ==
Nominations
Year	Event	Prize	Recipient	Result	Ref.
2018	2018 Best of Nollywood Awards	Revelation of the Year – Male	Mike Afolarin	Nominated	
2020	2020 Best of Nollywood Awards	Revelation of the Year – Male	Mike Afolarin	Nominated	
2022	2022 The Future Awards Africa	Acting		Nominated	
2025	Africa Magic Viewers' Choice Awards	Best Supporting Actor	Mike Afolarin	Nominated	

== See also ==
- List of Yoruba people
- List of Nigerian actors
