= The Twelve (novel) =

2012 novel by Justin Cronin

- Cover of the 2012 first edition hardback
- Author: Justin Cronin
- Cover artist: Tom Hallman
- Language: English
- Series: The Passage series
- Release number: 2
- Genre: Apocalyptic and post-apocalyptic fiction, horror, science fiction, vampire fiction, fantasy, dystopian fiction
- Publisher: Ballantine Books
- Publication date: October 16, 2012
- Publication place: United States
- Media type: Hardcover
- ISBN: 9780345504982
- Preceded by: The Passage
- Followed by: The City of Mirrors

The Twelve is a 2012 horror novel by Justin Cronin and is the second novel in The Passage trilogy, following the novel The Passage. The Twelve was published on October 16, 2012, by Ballantine Books. The trilogy was concluded with the publishing of The City of Mirrors, which was released in 2016.

== Plot ==
After briefly revisiting some of the surviving characters from the first book, the novel jumps back to the start of the plague. Four plot lines emerge: an autistic young school-bus driver named Danny decides to take his bus on his rounds one more time; an ex-military sniper named Kittridge holes up on a high floor of a Denver apartment building and begins shooting virals; Lawrence Grey, a janitor from the complex that Project Noah began in, wakes up in a hotel only to find himself younger and slimmer than he used to be; and Horace Guilder (a dying federal government functionary) copes with the country falling apart around him.

Danny happens to come across two children: 18-year-old April Donadio and Tim, her younger brother, and picks them up. Meanwhile, Grey encounters a disoriented pregnant woman, who does not realize the dissolution of society around her, shopping for paint for her baby's bedroom in an abandoned Home Depot. She is Lila Beatrice Kyle, Brad Wolgast's ex-wife. Subsequently, Grey is mistaken as one of the workers and ends up helping Lila paint her house; a bond is forged between the two. Danny and company drive to a stadium outside of Denver that was designated as a rescue site only to discover it full of thousands of dead bodies. Soon after, Danny, Tim and April meet Kittridge, who successfully escaped the virals and military at Denver. After traveling several miles together, they stumble upon a FEMA semi-trailer full of survivors. Grey (who is being tracked by satellite) and Lila are captured by Guilder and taken to a research center. Kittridge and company, with the help of Major Frances Porcheki, arrive at a refugee site just outside the research center. It emerges that the government is expecting the virals to attack the refugee camp, and, rather than moving the refugees, is going to wait until that happens in order to bomb it. While Danny and April escape in the bus, Kittridge and Tim do not, and they are killed by the bomb. Grey manages to escape after apparently killing Suresh, a medical examiner, and Nelson before taking Guilder hostage. As Grey, Guilder, and Lila try to escape in a helicopter, the bombs fall and the helicopter crashes. Guilder knocks Grey out with a chunk of concrete.

The story skips forward 75 years to about 15 years before the time of the first book. A group of families, including the Vorhees family (Curtis Vorhees [later known as General Vorhees in the aforementioned The Passage], his wife Dee Vorhees, and their two daughters) set out to a field for a picnic. They are also joined by Nathan Crukshank and Tifty Lamont, childhood friends of Curtis and Dee. As the families have their picnic, secure in the knowledge that it's a bright day (as virals often avoid daylight), the men sweep the nearby fields for any signs of virals. It is shown that Curtis despises Tifty's presence, claiming that Tifty was responsible for the death of his brother, Boz.

The plot then returns to when Curtis, Dee, Crukshank, Boz, and Tifty were children. As the gang meets Tifty, Tifty claims that he has seen the legendary Colonel Niles Coffee and convinces the children to follow him to Colonel Coffee's camp nearby. By midnight, they travel to the camp by an underground waterway; Tifty, being the leader, sees water rushing through the vents and yells for them to run away. Boz is killed when he is crushed against the bars by the water current, and it is at this point that Curtis becomes scarred. The story returns to the present, with the men sweeping the fields. There are secure, hardened steel shelters nearby, known as hardboxes, which offer protection and shelter if any virals were to attack. Late in the day, a solar eclipse occurs. Virals pour out of the shelters where they had been hiding and massacre the families, killing Dee. Among the virals is a seemingly human woman who is able to hypnotize some of the children and spirit them away. The event is later known as the "Massacre of the Field".

The story skips forward another 20 years to about five years after the time of the first book. Amy is working in an orphanage in the military base. Later at night, Amy has a dream in which Wolgast appears; Wolgast gives Amy a cryptic message to find and "go to him" when the time is right. Peter Jaxon has joined the Expeditionary and is a decorated veteran. It is said that Theo Jaxon, Mausami, and seemingly Sara were killed in the Roswell Massacre of the first book. Satch Dodd, the youngest survivor of the Massacre of The Field, in which his whole family was murdered, joins Peter at the mess hall. Alicia Donadio has tracked down the home base of Julio Martinez, one of the Twelve, and leads an operation only to find him gone and only his familiar, Ignacio, who is also a janitor from Project Noah left behind. Satch is killed by bats in a tunnel. They have been trying to find the remaining 11 members of The Twelve for five years with no success and it's clear that the government is going to stop.

Peter is assigned to guard an oil delivery. He encounters Michael and his girlfriend, Lore. On the way back with a convoy of fuel, they encounter the hypnotic woman from the field along with a group of virals. Peter is immune to her powers, much to her surprise, and the ambush goes poorly for both parties when one of the convoy members explodes a fuel truck. Peter, Michael, and Lore escape, as does the woman.

Meanwhile, Alicia discovers a large city in Iowa and decides to investigate further. The city is run by Guilder, who is surviving along with Lila Kyle (revealed to be the hypnotic woman) by draining blood from Grey, who has been chained in a basement for 100 years. Despite this, Grey is quite sane and lucid. Kyle is in a delusional state, and Guilder is not much better. In the city is Sara, who survived the first book after all. However, she lost the baby she was pregnant with and is now serving in a concentration camp with the lower classes of the city. The city is run by "redeyes," who are fed blood from Grey to keep young and healthy, and "cols" (collaborators), who serve as cruel enforcers.

Sara's death is faked by a resistance group led by a fictional leader named Sergio. The real leaders are a soldier named Eustace and a woman named Nina. Sara is renamed Dani and snuck into the capitol building as a new assistant to Lila Kyle. Here, she discovers that her daughter, who she thought was dead, was in fact presented to Lila Kyle as her own daughter as a prop for her delusions.

Meanwhile, back at the military city in Texas, Amy and an imprisoned former-Colonel Greer escape and head to Iowa. Peter, Michael, Lore, Hollis (Sara's boyfriend from the first book), and a black marketeer named Tifty, who was at the massacre of the field, head out to Iowa close behind.

Alicia, unable to stand idly by, is captured by the Iowans and is brutally tortured and raped before escaping.

In Iowa, it turns out that Guilder is preparing a site for all of the 11 master virals to stay permanently. They arrive, including Carter, who is much smaller than the rest. All of the parties from outside find each other (Amy, Alicia, Peter, and their groups). They find Nina from the Iowan resistance and form a plan. Amy will present herself as "Sergio" and, when Guilder holds an elaborate execution and brings the entire town to watch, the resistance will be able to strike.

Meanwhile, Lila becomes coherent for the first time in 100 years, gives Sara her daughter and goes to the basement to find Grey. Instead of releasing him, though, she lights the massive ether supplies she finds, destroying the capitol building.

Meanwhile, at the execution, Amy is confronted with the remaining 11 master virals. A massive fight erupts, where it is revealed that Carter isn't actually Carter, but Wolgast. Wolgast manages to explode a bomb that kills all the master virals and himself. Amy turns into a viral herself and leaves, leaving the others unsure whether she is dead or alive. She appears in a brief scene with Peter after he leaves the Homeland when her transformation is complete.

Amy visits Carter in his mind and they both prepare to wait for Zero, the first of all the virals, to come for them. Zero calls to Alicia to come join him, but Alicia replies that she will come, but only to kill him.

== Reception ==
Reception for The Twelve has been mostly positive, with Kirkus Reviews praising the book. BookPage wrote that the ending to The Twelve was more satisfying than that of The Passage, but that "there are plenty of loose threads to keep readers eager for book three". Suvudu listed the book as one of its "Best Bets for 2012".
