= Prospero =

Character in William Shakespeare's The Tempest

- The Tempest character
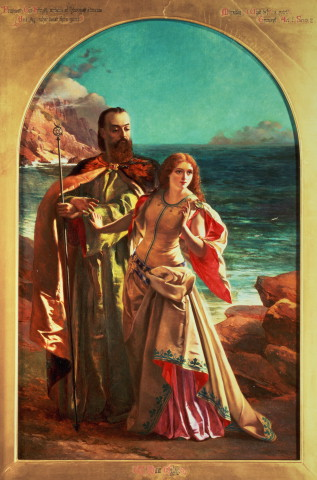
- Prospero and Miranda by William Maw Egley
- Created by: William Shakespeare

In-universe information
- Family: Miranda (daughter)

Prospero (/ˈprɒspəroʊ/ PROS-pər-o) is a fictional character and the protagonist of William Shakespeare's play The Tempest.

== Character ==
Twelve years before the play begins, Prospero is usurped from his position as the rightful Duke of Milan by his brother Antonio, who puts Prospero and his three-year-old daughter Miranda to sea on a "rotten carcass" of a boat to die. Prospero and Miranda survive and find exile on a small island inhabited mostly by spirits. Prospero learns sorcery from books, and uses it to protect Miranda.

Before the play begins, Prospero freed the magical spirit Ariel from entrapment within "a cloven pine". Ariel is beholden to Prospero after he is freed from his imprisonment inside the pine tree. Prospero then takes Ariel as a slave. Prospero's sorcery is sufficiently powerful to control Ariel and other spirits, as well as to alter weather and even raise the dead: "Graves at my command have waked their sleepers, oped, and let 'em forth, by my so potent Art." - Act V, scene 1.

On the island, Prospero becomes master of the monster Caliban, the son of a malevolent witch named Sycorax, and forces Caliban into submission by punishing him with magic if he does not obey.

=== Prospero's speech ===
The Tempest is believed to be the last play Shakespeare wrote alone. In this play there are two candidate soliloquies by Prospero which critics have taken to be Shakespeare's own "retirement speech".

One speech is the "Our revels now are ended" or "Cloud-capp'd towers..." speech:

Our revels now are ended: These our actors—,
As I foretold you—, were all spirits and
Are melted into air, into thin air;
And, like the baseless fabric of this vision,
The cloud-capp'd towers, the gorgeous palaces,
The solemn temples, the great globe itself,
Yea, all which it inherit, shall dissolve
And, like this insubstantial pageant faded,
Leave not a rack behind: we are such stuff
As dreams are made on, and our little life
Is rounded with a sleep. — The Tempest, Act 4, Scene 1

The final soliloquy and epilogue is the other candidate.

Now my charms are all o'erthrown,
And what strength I have's mine own,
Which is most faint: now, 'tis true,
I must be here confined by you,
Or sent to Naples. Let me not,
Since I have my dukedom got
And pardon'd the deceiver, dwell
In this bare island by your spell;
But release me from my bands
With the help of your good hands:
Gentle breath of yours my sails
Must fill, or else my project fails,
Which was to please. Now I want
Spirits to enforce, art to enchant,
And my ending is despair,
Unless I be relieved by prayer,
Which pierces so that it assaults
Mercy itself and frees all faults.
As you from crimes would pardon'd be,
Let your indulgence set me free.

== Portrayals ==
=== Stage ===
Portrayals of Prospero in Royal Shakespeare Company productions include:

- Robert Harris (1948)
- Sir Michael Redgrave (1951)
- Sir Ralph Richardson (1952)
- Sir John Gielgud (1956, 1957)
- Tom Fleming (1963)
- Ian Richardson (1970)
- Michael Aldridge (1974)
- Sir Michael Hordern (1978)
- Sir Derek Jacobi (1982)
- John Wood (1988)
- Alec McCowen (1993)
- Paul Jesson (1995)
- David Calder (1998)
- Philip Voss (2000), a production that utilized vocal music rather than instrumental
- Malcolm Storry (2002)
- Sir Patrick Stewart (2006) in Rupert Goold's very loose 2006 interpretation
- Sir Anthony Sher (2009)
- Jonathan Slinger (2012) directed by David Farr.
- Sir Simon Russell Beale (2016), a production directed by Sir Gregory Doran that used Digital technology to create many of the special effects.
- Sir Kenneth Branagh (2026), in a production directed by Sir Richard Eyre

Portrayals of Prospero at the Old Vic include:

- Sir John Gielgud (1931, 1940, 1974)
- Max von Sydow (1988)
- Sir Derek Jacobi (2003)
- Stephen Dillane (2010)

Portrayals of Prospero for the New York Shakespeare Festival include:

- James Earl Jones (1962)
- Raul Julia (1981)
- Sir Patrick Stewart (1995) at the Delacorte Theater, later moved to Broadway's Broadhurst Theater.
- Sam Waterston (2015)

Portrayals of Prospero for the Globe Theatre include:

- Vanessa Redgrave (2000); she also played "Ariel" to her father Sir Michael Redgrave's "Prospero" in the 1964 Caedmon recording.
- Roger Allam (2013), videotaped and later broadcast as part of their Live Cinema broadcasts.

Portrayals of Prospero for the Stratford Shakespeare Festival include:

- William Hutt (1962, 1976, 1999, 2005)
- Len Cariou (1982), videotaped and broadcast on television in 1983
- Alan Scarfe (1992)
- Christopher Plummer (2010), videotaped and broadcast on television
- Martha Henry (2018)

Other stage portrayals of Prospero include:

- Graham Crowden (1970), at London's Mermaid Theatre, directed by Jonathan Miller.
- Sir John Gielgud (1974), at the National Theatre.
- Sam Waterston (1974), Off-Broadway at the Mitzi E. Newhouse Theater at Lincoln Center.
- Sir Anthony Hopkins (1979), opposite Stephanie Zimbalist as Miranda at the Mark Taper Forum in Los Angeles.
- Frank Langella (1989), opposite B. D. Wong as Ariel with the Roundabout Theatre Company in New York City.
- Blair Brown as "Prospera" (2003), at the McCarter Theatre Center in Princeton, New Jersey.
- Ralph Fiennes (2011), at the Theatre Royal Haymarket directed by Trevor Nunn.
- Harriet Walter (2017), in Phyllida Lloyd's Donmar Warehouse production, which was set in an all-women's prison and performed by the inmates.
- Kate Burton as "Prospera" (2018), at the Old Globe Theatre in San Diego.

=== Film and television ===
- Maurice Evans, 1960 (TV, Hallmark Hall of Fame)
- Sir Michael Redgrave, 1968 (BBC-TV, Play of the Month)
- Heathcote Williams, 1979 (film version directed by Derek Jarman)
- Sir Michael Hordern, 1980 (BBC-TV, BBC Television Shakespeare)
- Efrem Zimbalist Jr., 1983 (videotaped production for Bard Productions)
- John Gielgud, 1991 (film adaptation Prospero's Books directed by Peter Greenaway)
- Timothy West, 1992 (voice of Prospero in abridged animated production for Shakespeare: The Animated Tales)
- Dame Helen Mirren, 2010 (film adaptation directed by Julie Taymor, renamed "Prospera")
- Patrick Robinson, 2018 (Filmed for CBeebies at the Lawrence Batley Theatre, Huddersfield, in front of a live invited audience)

Prospero-esque characters have included:

- Paul Mazursky's film Tempest (1982) starring John Cassavetes as "Philip Dimitrius", who is an exile of his own cynical discontent, ego and self-betrayal and who abandons America for a utopian "kingdom" on a secluded Greek isle.
- The 1998 TV movie The Tempest, set in a Mississippi bayou during the American Civil War, based on Shakespeare's play and starring Peter Fonda as "Gideon Prosper", a Prospero-esque plantation owner who has learned voodoo from his slaves.

=== Audio ===
Audio portrayals of Prospero include:

- Sir John Gielgud in four BBC Radio productions: 1933 (on the BBC National Programme), 1948 (on the BBC Home Service), 1953 and 1989 (on the BBC World Service).
- John Barrymore (1937) (an abridged version of The Tempest on the 12 July episode of the short-lived NBC radio series Streamlined Shakespeare; this episode was re-broadcast on 31 August 1950 with the series' name changed to John Barrymore and Shakespeare)
- Sir Cedric Hardwicke (1940) (a one-hour adaptation of The Tempest on the 24 November episode of the NBC radio series Great Plays)
- Norman Shelley (1951) (BBC Third Programme)
- Sir Michael Hordern (1960) (Argo Records recording)
- Sir Michael Redgrave (1964) (Caedmon Records recording [SRS-201])
- Alec Clunes (1964) (BBC Home Service).
- Paul Scofield (1974) (BBC Radio 3)
- Ronald Pickup (1996) (BBC Radio 3 Sunday Play)
- Bob Peck (1999) (The Complete Arkangel Shakespeare series recording)
- Philip Madoc (2001) (BBC Radio 3 Sunday Play, adapted for radio and directed by David Hunter)
- Sir Ian McKellen (2004) (Naxos Records recording)
- David Warner (2012) (BBC Radio 3 Drama on 3, broadcast as part of the Shakespeare Unlocked series, adapted for radio and directed by Jeremy Mortimer)

== In popular culture ==
- In the TV series The Sandman by Neil Gaiman and Allan Heinberg, Prospero serves as a proxy for Dream in Shakespeare's final play as a part of a deal he struck with Morpheus.
- In the comic book series The League of Extraordinary Gentlemen by Alan Moore and Kevin O'Neill, Prospero appears as a founding member of the first such grouping in 1610, alongside his familiars Caliban and Ariel.
- Paul Prospero, the protagonist of The Vanishing of Ethan Carter (2014), is named after Prospero.
- In John Bellairs's novel The Face in the Frost (1969), one of the protagonists is a wizard named Prospero ("and not the one you're thinking of") .
- In Warhammer: 40,000 and further fleshed out in The Horus Heresy series, several books take place on a planet called Prospero, home of Magnus the Red and his Thousand Sons Space Marine legion. The citizens of the planet are versed in sorcery and psychic powers, earning them the suspicion and ire of the rest of the Imperium of Man.
- Melon Cauliflower, by New Zealand playwright Tom McCrory, is about a man Prospero, in his late sixties, who struggles to come to terms with the death of his wife and has mistreated his daughter Miranda.
- "The Masque of the Red Death", by Edgar Allan Poe, is set at the manor of a Prince Prospero
- In the television series Star Trek: The Next Generation by Gene Roddenberry and CBS / Paramount Pictures, Prospero appears briefly played by Lt. Cmdr. Data (Brent Spiner) during the beginning of Season 7 Episode 23 entitled "Emergence". He recites some lines of Prospero's speech before asking Captain Picard (Patrick Stewart) to provide some insight into the character of Prospero and Shakespeare's The Tempest in general.
- In the mobile game Star Trek Timelines a character was released in February 2017 called Prospero Data, recalling the character's appearance in the previously mentioned Star Trek: The Next Generation episode.
- A good wizard named Prospero appears in Polish children's animated cartoon Miś Fantazy based on the books by Ewa Karwan-Jastrzębska.
- Prospero is the main antagonist in season 2 of TV series The Librarians. This version of Prospero (Richard Cox) is a Fictional, a character brought to life by magic, and has become bitter over the way his story was written, as he feels it was made without his consent. After regaining his book and obtaining the Staff of Zarathustra, he imprisons the Librarians within his illusions, but his servant Ariel (an actual fairy rather than a character) rebels and frees them. Prospero subsequently begins to reshape the world in his image, while also possessing his creator Shakespeare in order to change the past. The Librarians destroy his staff and exorcise him from Shakespeare's body, banishing him back to his original story.
- In episode 1 of the video game Life is Strange: Before the Storm, the drama students of Blackwell Academy are seen rehearsing for their upcoming play, The Tempest. The character Rachel Amber plays Prospero and the player character, Chloe Price plays Ariel briefly. The play itself occurs during episode 2.
- In the manga series One Piece, a character with the name Perospero appears as a recurring character, partly inspired by Prospero. His mother, Charlotte Linlin, also seems to be inspired by the character as she is the one to use magic to control everything on the island she rules with her soul.
- The novels and television series The Expanse use several Shakespearean allusions, including "Caliban" in reference to monstrous human-alien hybrids, and correspondingly "Prospero Station", a research facility that was developing and controlling them.
- In the national bestseller The Night Circus by Erin Morgenstern, magician Hector Bowen, father of protagonist Celia Bowen, goes by the name of Prospero whilst performing.
- In the season 30 episode of The Simpsons titled "I'm Just a Girl Who Can't Say D'oh", Sideshow Mel leaves a play Marge is directing to play Prospero and is replaced by Professor Frink.
- In the strategy game Into the Breach: There is a possibility to gain a red colored robotic pilot named Prospero by default. This pilot has the special ability of giving the mech he pilots flight.
- In the flight simulator Project Wingman, a major city of Cascadia, an allied nation to the protagonist, is named Prospero.
- In the anime series Mobile Suit Gundam: The Witch from Mercury, the main character's mother goes by the name Prospera Mercury. She has sent her daughter, Suletta Mercury, to a piloting school alongside a Gundam named Aerial.
- Prospero's 'our revels now are ended' speech, is recited by Anton Lesser to play out the final episode of Endeavour, the prequel to Inspector Morse.
- In the 2023 dystopian novel The Ferryman by Justin Cronin, the setting is an archipelago named Prospera. Prospero's speeches are quoted several times throughout the novel.
- The novels Ilium/Olympos by Dan Simmons feature Prospero as well as several other characters from The Tempest.
- In the BBC television series Doctor Who, the Sycorax are an alien race who invade the Earth at Christmas. The Sycorax possess a science, similar to witchcraft, which allows them to use a blood sample to control all humans of the same blood type.
- In the play Rough Magic by comic book author Roberto Aguirre-Sacasa, Prospero is accidentally brought into the real world of New York City by the character Melanie, a dramaturge with magical powers she is just learning to control.
- In Call of Duty: Black Ops III, the Zombies character Dr. Monty recites a section of The Tempest. It has been largely implied the character of Monty was based on alchemist and esotericist Dr. John Dee, who in turn has been said to be the inspiration for Prospero.
