= Caroline Chikezie =

British-Nigerian actress (born 1974)

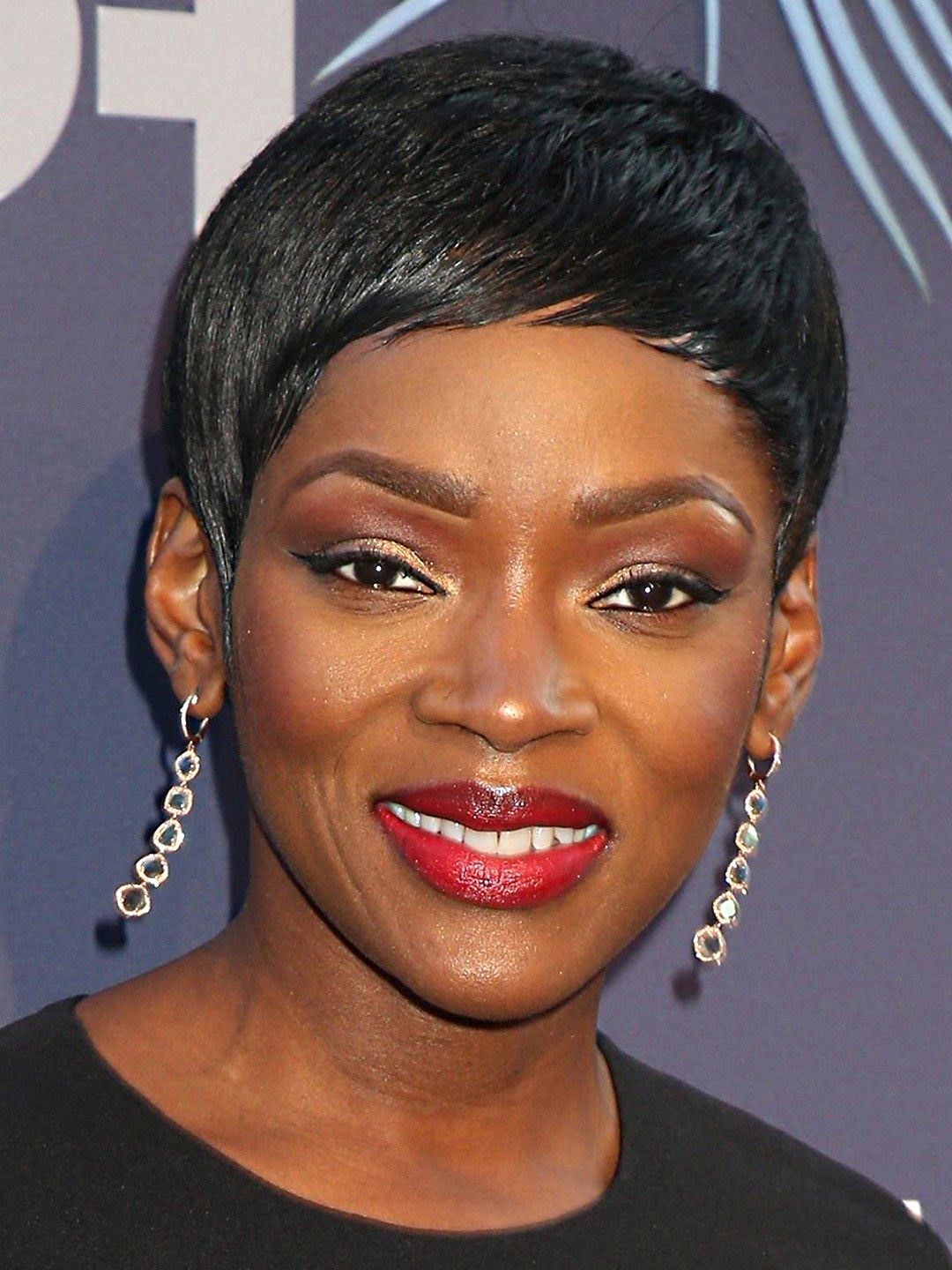
- Born: 19 February 1974 (age 52); London, England, UK
- Education: Brunel University
- Occupation: Actress
- Years active: 1998–present
- Spouse: Adrian Holmes

Caroline Chikezie// (born 19 February 1974) is a British Nigerian actress, best known for playing Sasha Williams in As If, and Elaine Hardy in Footballers' Wives. In 2016, she gained attention in Nigeria playing the title role in the Nigerian series The Governor.

== Early life and background ==
Chikezie was born in England to Nigerian parents of Igbo origin. At fourteen, Chikezie was sent to boarding school in Nigeria in an attempt to make her abandon her dreams of becoming an actress. Before this, she had attended weekend classes at Italia Conti.

== Education ==
She enrolled at Brunel University where she studied Medicinal Chemistry (she was expected to take over her father's hospital in Nigeria), but dropped out of school. She later won a scholarship to the UK's Academy of Live and Recorded Arts.

== Career ==
After roles in Holby City, Casualty, and the award-winning British film Babymother, Chikezie landed her first major role as bitchy Sasha Williams in As If in 2001. In 2004, she landed a regular role as Kyle Pascoe's girlfriend Elaine Hardy in Series Three of Footballer's Wives.

Other television work includes 40, Judas Kiss, Free Fall, and Brothers and Sisters.

She appeared as Lisa Hallett, a member of the secret organization of Torchwood who had been transformed into a half-human half-Cyberman in "Cyberwoman", an episode of Torchwood, and as Tamara, a fellow demon hunter, in the 3rd-season premiere of Supernatural. In 2018, she starred as a recurring character, Queen Tamlin of Leah in the 2nd season of Shannara Chronicles.

She also starred as Angela Ochello in the hit EbonyLife Television series, The Governor.

From 2023 to 2024, she played Noma in the popular Starz television series, Power Book II: Ghost.

== Film ==
Chikezie portrayed Nasuada in the 2006 fantasy film Eragon.

== Filmography ==
Year	Title	Role	Notes
1998	Brothers and Sisters	Belinda Ofori	TV series
1998	Babymother	Sharon	TV film
1999	Virtual Sexuality	Gushy Assistant	
1999	Casualty	Donna	Episode: "Free Fall"
2001	As If	Sasha Williams	7 episodes
2002	Holby City	Jamila James	Episode: "Judas Kiss: Part 1 & 2"
2002	Babyfather	Kandii	Episode: "2.1"
2003	40	Denise	3 episodes
2004	Footballers' Wives	Elaine Hardy	7 episodes
2005	The Mistress of Spices	Myisha	
2005	Aeon Flux	Freya	
2006	Take 3 Girls	Spot	
2006	Breaking and Entering	Erika	
2006	Eragon	Nasuada	
2006–07	Torchwood	Lisa Hallett	2 episodes
2007	Nice Girls Don't Get the Corner Office	Rachel	TV film
2007	Supernatural	Tamara	Episode: "The Magnificent Seven"
2009	The Killing of Wendy	Zora	
2010	Paris Connections	Nathalie de Barge	Mystery / Romance
2010	Inale	Inale	Musical
2012	Casualty	Teri Layeni	Episode: "All in a Day's Nightmare"
2012	The Sweeney	Clarke	
2012	Crime Stories	Susie Fisher	Episode: "1.20"
2013	By Any Means	Tanya	TV Mini Series 1 episode
2014	Everly	Zelda	Action / Thriller
2016	The Governor	Angela Ochello (Governor)	Episodes 1 & 2 as Deputy Governor, Episodes 3 to 13 as Governor
2017	Mayhem	Kara 'The Siren' Powell	
2017	The Shannara Chronicles	Queen Tamlin	Episodes: "Wraith", "Graymark", "Dweller" 7 episodes
2019	The Passage	Dr. Major Nichole Sykes	10 episodes
2023–24	Power Book II: Ghost	Noma Asaju	Recurring role (season 3) main role (season 4)
2025	Bel-Air	Dominique Warren	Special Guest Appearance (Season 4)
