= List of Nigerian films of 2019 =

This is a list of Nigerian films scheduled for theatrical release in 2019.

== 2019 ==
=== January–March ===
Opening		Title	Director	Cast	Studio	Ref.
J A N U A R Y	13	Levi	Okechukwu Oku	Lydia Forson; Nancy Isime; Benjamin Joseph; Ramsey Nouah		
F E B R U A R Y	1	Let Karma	Biodun Stephen	Evelyn Bada; Blossom Chukwujekwu; Chucks Chyke; Daniel K. Daniel		
F E B R U A R Y	10	Obey	Martinz Nnaji Jr.	Jibola Dabo; Debby Felix; Anthony Monjaro		
F E B R U A R Y	15	Loving Danielle	Ike Nnaebue	Blossom Chukwujekwu; Theresa Edem; Alexx Ekubo		
F E B R U A R Y	28	Chains	Andrew Osawuru	Josephine Agbonmwanre; Sharon Eronmwansuyi; Calistra Akenobo; Edgar Ogbeifun; Success Akpojotor		
M A R C H	23	Kuvana	Edward Uka	Ifeanyi Kalu; Sambasa Nzeribe; Wale Ojo; Emmanuel Okhakhu		
M A R C H	29	Nimbe	Tope Alake	Doyin Abiola; Toyin Abraham; Odunlade Adekola; Bukola Beecraft-Shofola		

=== April–June ===
Opening		Title	Director	Cast	Studio	Ref.
A P R I L	17	Blood & Oil	Curtis Graham	Michael Douglas Cake; Alket Kellichi; William R. Moses		
A P R I L	17	Alter Date	Marc Adebesin	Iyabo Ojo; Bolanle Ninalowo; Kenneth Okolie		
J U N E	28	Bling Lagosians	Bolanle Austen-Peters	Bunmi Aboderin; Toyin Abraham; Tana Adelana; Osas Ighodaro Ajibade		
J U N E	28	Coming From Insanity	Akinyemi Sebastian Akinropo	Gabriel Afolayan; Damilola Adegbite; Bolanle Ninalowo; Wale Ojo		

=== July–September ===
Opening		Title	Director	Cast	Studio	Ref.
S E P T E M B E R	27	Love is War	Omoni Oboli	Richard Mofe Damijo Shaffy Bello; William Benson; Yemi Blaq		

=== October–November ===
Opening		Title	Director	Cast	Studio	Ref.
O C T O B E R	4	Three Thieves (film)	Udoka Oyeka	Shawn Faqua; Koye Kekere-Ekun; Frank Donga	Trino Motion Pictures	
O C T O B E R	4	Don't Get Mad Get Even (film)	Wale Ojo	Femi JacobsYemi Solade Deyemi Okanlanwon Kenneth Okolie Toyin Abraham Patience Ozokwor Jide Kosoko	RGD Media	
O C T O B E R	11	Elevator Baby	Akay Mason	Toyin AbrahamTimini Egbuson; Sambasa NzeribeSamuel Olatunji; Emem Ufot Shafy Bello	Anthill Studios	
O C T O B E R	25	The Herbert Macaulay Affair	Imoh Umoren	William Benson Saidi Balogun Kelechi Udegbe Martha Ehinome Orhiere	Rucksack Productionz	
D E C E M B E R	11	Kpali	Ladipo Johnson	Ini Dima-Okojie Nkem Owoh Gloria Anozie Young Linda Ejiofor Kunle Remi	Vzhun Films	

== See also ==
- 2019 in Nigeria
- List of Nigerian films
