= The City of Mirrors =

Book by Justin Cronin

- Cover of the 2016 first edition hardback
- Author: Justin Cronin
- Cover artist: Tom Hallman
- Language: English
- Genre: Apocalyptic and post-apocalyptic fiction, horror, science fiction, vampire fiction, fantasy, dystopian fiction
- Publisher: Ballantine Books
- Publication date: May 24, 2016
- Publication place: United States
- Media type: Hardcover
- ISBN: 978-0345505002
- Preceded by: The Twelve

The City of Mirrors is a 2016 horror novel by Justin Cronin and is the final novel in The Passage trilogy, following the novel The Twelve. The City of Mirrors was released for publication on May 24, 2016 by Ballantine Books.

The film rights to the three novels were acquired in 2007 for adaptation into a film trilogy, but after 12 years of development and planning, it has been changed to a television series, premiering in January 2019.

The City of Mirrors picks up where The Twelve left off, following the destruction of the Twelve and their viral followers, and explores the background of Subject Zero, the first human to be changed in the early 21st century. It delves into lengthy flashbacks, and also jumps 900 years into the future to reveal humanity's fate.

== Plot ==
Alicia Donadio's child, the result of her rape in The Twelve, is stillborn. She forces herself out of her stupor and decides to hunt down Zero.

Michael Fisher sails around the continent looking for the storied mines that were placed to keep the viral contamination at bay. He learns the virus has spread to the rest of the world, that the mines do not exist, and that the most of human civilization was completely wiped out by a mutated version of the virus. He finds an ocean liner beached in the Gulf of Mexico, and determines to fix it and sail to a safe island to save some portion of humanity. Lucius Greer has been keeping Amy and Carter alive in the cargo hold of their own ship, the Chevron Mariner, by bringing them blood to feed on. Amy has no control over herself as a viral while Carter seems to be able to control his impulses.

Peter Jaxon is raising his nephew Caleb in Kerrvile, the capital of the Republic of Texas. In his dreams, he lives with a human Amy (though he has not actually seen her in years). He accepts a request from the newly-elected president of the Republic of Texas to join her administration in leading an initiative to open the town's security gates—since the virals have not been seen for years—and allow humanity to branch out.

Alicia finds Zero in New York City, but learns he is her infector; thus, she cannot kill him. He befriends her and reveals he was originally Tim Fanning, who had a crush on Jonas Lear's girlfriend Liz during college. Later in life, when Jonas's science pulled him away from home in search of a cure for Liz's cancer, Liz and Tim had a brief tryst. Liz died from her cancer just before she and Fanning were to leave town to spend Liz's remaining days together. After Liz died, Tim eventually joined Jonas in his research to find a solution to humanity's challenge (resulting in Amy). The rest of his story is chronicled in the beginning of The Passage: Tim is the only one of the Twelve to survive the initial infection and thus becomes the first viral (Subject Zero). He reveals how almost drowning was what reverted him to human form, but retains everything else bestowed on him by the virus.

Michael has worked for twenty years to rebuild the ship. Peter is now President of Texas, but finds that the human colonies have been able to spread so far that this may be the last presidency.

Alicia, having lived with Zero for 20 years, learns of his plan to kill the remaining humans in his quest to destroy Amy. Alicia leaves to warn her friends, while Zero sends his Many (infected virals) towards Texas in a plan to draw Amy out of hiding.

The Many kill/convert the outer colonies, finally converging on Kerrville. Amy is restored to human form after being submerged in the sea, much like Zero's transformation in water. Carter transfers his Many over to Amy to assist in defending Kerrville. Zero's army prevails, leaving only 700 human survivors when the morning sun drives the virals off. Peter and Michael lead the people to the ship, arriving on the coast at dusk. Zero's Many attack, but Carter sacrifices his life to help Amy and the survivors safely escape on the ship.

Virals Alicia and Amy are joined by Peter and Michael, leaving the ship to find and kill Zero in New York City, in order to end the plague. Peter is bitten by Zero, but his love for Amy prevents him from killing her at Zero's command. Amy kills Zero, then saves Peter with her own blood, preventing him from being destroyed along with the rest of Zero's Many. A near-drowning removes all traces of the virus from Alicia, who then decides to jump to her death. Michael sails his boat, the Nautilus, to England. Virals Amy and Peter live together until he dies of old age after a few hundred years.

The Kerrville survivors sail to the safe island, becoming the cradle for humanity. After 1000 years (which is said to be the minimum required time for the virals to die off on their own in case they would not be stopped), their descendants return to North America. They find an ancient Amy, who tells them her story.
