= Otiti =

- Directed by: Ema Edosio
- Release date: 2022
- Running time: 120
- Country: Nigeria
- Languages: Nigerian Pidgin; English

Otiti is a 2022 Nigerian drama film directed by Ema Edosio who also co-wrote the screenplay with Chijioke Ononiwu. It follows a young seamstress who confronts long-buried family trauma after seeking out her estranged, ailing father.

== Plot ==
Otiti centres on a withdrawn seamstress living on the outskirts of a Nigerian city, who is preparing for a career-defining opportunity when she discovers she needs her original birth certificate to formalise her fashion business. The search for this document compels her to reconnect with the father who abandoned her as a child, drawing her into fraught encounters with his new family and forcing her to revisit painful memories.

As she assumes responsibility for her father's care, Otiti navigates resentment from her half-brothers and the weight of economic and emotional precarity, reflecting the broader struggles of many urban Nigerians. The story emphasizes themes of intergenerational trauma, duty, and the limits of reconciliation, subverting common melodramatic tropes of a lost child joyfully reunited with a wealthy parent.

== Cast and characters ==
- Gina Castel as Otiti
- Mary Agholor as Ijeoma
- Tessy Brown as woman
- Casmir Chibuike as registration officer
- Tunde Daniels as Lambert
- Yinka Davies as Aunty Onome
- Toritseju Ejoh as Dafe
- Charles Etubiebi as Odion
- Chimezie Imo as Tega
- Emem Isaac as Amaka
- Gbenga Kelly as photographer
- Obi Maduegbuna as Ejiro
- Chioma Orji as Ladi
- Toyin Oshinaike as Omonigbo
- Osagie Solomon as admin officer
