= The Passage (Cronin novel) =

2010 novel by Justin Cronin

- Author: Justin Cronin
- Illustrator: David Lindroth
- Cover artist: Tom Hallman
- Language: English
- Genre: Apocalyptic and post-apocalyptic fiction, horror, science fiction, vampire fiction, fantasy, dystopian fiction
- Publisher: Ballantine Books
- Publication date: June 8, 2010
- Publication place: United States
- Media type: Hardcover
- Pages: Hardcover, 766; Paperback, 879
- ISBN: 978-0-345-50496-8
- Followed by: The Twelve

The Passage is a novel by Justin Cronin, published in 2010 by Ballantine Books, a division of Random House, Inc., New York. The Passage debuted at #3 on the New York Times hardcover fiction best seller list, and remained on the list for seven additional weeks. It is the first novel of a completed trilogy; the second book The Twelve was released in 2012, and the third book The City of Mirrors released in 2016. The novel and its sequels were to be adapted into a film trilogy; however, they were instead developed into a Fox television series.

== Setting ==
The Passage begins in the near future and details an apocalyptic and, later, post-apocalyptic world that is overrun by zombie/vampire like beings who are infected by a highly contagious virus. What begins as a project to develop a new immunity-boosting drug based on a virus carried by an unnamed species of bat in South America eventually becomes the virus that transforms the world. The novel begins in 2016 and spans more than ninety years, as colonies of humans attempt to live in a world filled with superhuman creatures who are continually on the hunt for fresh blood. Major parts of the story take place in modern day California and Colorado.

== Development ==
Cronin first began developing his ideas for The Passage in 2006 when his daughter asked him to write a book about a "girl who saves the world." He set out to write a book that combined elements of multiple genres, most predominantly horror, science fiction, and fantasy. Cronin wanted his vampiric creatures to seem like real-world organisms that might have inspired the vampire stories he knew from his childhood and the vampire-like creatures found in the folklore of numerous cultures. Cronin described writing the book as feeling "natural", and having come "very quickly". Cronin said that the title is a reference to the characters' journeys, and the journey "from life to death". Cronin said that many of the places featured in the novel were selected because they were places he had lived, and that he decided to "travel every mile my characters did, to capture not only the details of place, but the feeling of place."

== Plot ==
The novel is broken into 11 parts of varying lengths. The story itself is broken into two sections: the first and shorter section covers the origins of the virus and its outbreak, while the second is set 93 years after the infections, primarily following a colony of survivors living in California. Several narrative devices are used, including email, journal entries, newspaper reports, and other documents. Occasional use is made of reference material from 1,000 years after the outbreak, coming from "The Journal of Sara Fisher", sourced from a future "University of New South Wales, Indo-Australian Republic".

The U.S. government is conducting a top secret experiment referred to as "Project Noah" which involves acquiring and transporting death row inmates to a secret military compound in Colorado, ostensibly for the purposes of testing a drug intended to greatly prolong life. These genetic experiments originate from patient zero, Tim Fanning—one of two surviving members of an expedition investigating a Bolivian bat-carried virus. The virus, while causing hemorrhagic fever and death in those who initially contracted it, results in a boosting of the immune system and enhanced strength and agility in the current subjects. It is later revealed that Project Noah is intended to produce weaponized enhanced humans for the military, described as "the ultimate bunker busters".

The FBI agents responsible for recruiting the prisoners are ordered to collect six-year-old Amy Bellafonte from a convent and deliver her to Dr. Lear, the head of the project. At Noah she is exposed to a refined version of the serum administered to "The Twelve"—the original inmates. Lear theorizes that as Amy's immune system has not had the chance to mature it will form a symbiosis with the virus and live with her symbiotically, instead of the violent forms it has taken with the other twelve.

Of the inmates, the first and last recruited are depicted as being different from the others: Babcock, the original test subject, is stronger and appears to have developed psychic abilities, occasionally influencing his guards and cleaners; and Anthony Carter, who was convicted of a first-degree murder he did not commit.

Zero (Formerly Tim Fanning) and the other twelve inmates mentally take control of their guards and escape their quarantine cells, rapidly killing all who stand in their way. Amy is rescued by Brad Wolgast (the FBI agent who brought her to Noah) and Sister Lacey (a nun who was looking after Amy when she was recruited). Lacey is taken by Carter, as Wolgast and Amy escape to a mountain retreat where they live for several months, occasionally picking up news of the contagion spread throughout America. The rest of the world's fate is not stated, but it is mentioned that most European nations have imposed quarantine and closed their borders.

After months of living up on the mountain and building a relationship with Amy, Wolgast eventually succumbs to radiation sickness when a nuclear device is detonated nearby—he assumes that the government is attempting to sterilize infected areas of the country—and Amy is left to fend for herself.

The novel shifts forward in time approximately 93 years (with occasional reference retrospectively 1,000 years in the future), and the narrative is taken up around a self-sufficient, walled, isolationist colony established by the military in conjunction with FEMA not long after the initial outbreak. The First Colony is in slow decline, although only one character (a technician by the name of Michael Fisher) seems to recognize this; he is trying to establish clandestine radio contact with the outside world to obtain spares for their failing equipment—specifically their batteries which power the high-wattage lights which protect the colony from the virals, who in traditional vampiric style are highly light-sensitive.

During a nighttime attack, Amy arrives at the gates of the camp, having previously met Peter Jaxon (one of the colony's senior figures) during a foraging expedition. Amy's arrival also results in a break-in from the virals leading to the death of "Teacher"—the person responsible for the upbringing of all the children under eight in the colony. Amy now appears to be a fifteen-year-old girl, and upon her arrival is grievously wounded by a crossbow, but her own recuperative powers soon heal her and within days she is as healthy as she was before being injured.

Amy's arrival, her healing abilities, Teacher's death and inner-colony friction (caused by Babcock's mental influence over several Colony figures) force several of the colony dwellers to abscond with Amy and seek out another military site in Colorado—from where Michael has been receiving faint radio signals.

Amy demonstrates a psychic bond with the virals, and manages to keep the group of travelers relatively safe during their journey. They come across another settlement established in a Las Vegas prison, known as the Haven, which, while initially welcoming, is in fact Babcock's lair. The Haven's residents, most under the mental influence of Babcock, "feed" him blood sacrifices in exchange for being left alone by the horde of virals at his disposal, referred to as "The Many" (as opposed to The Twelve).

Theo Jaxon, Peter's brother who had been captured by virals months earlier, has been imprisoned here. Babcock is slowly attempting to grasp hold of his mind to make him a Familiar, but because he does not give in, he is served as a sacrifice. After resisting Babcock's mental influence, Theo and Mausami (his pregnant lover) are rescued by Peter.

During a botched attempt to kill Babcock during one of the monthly blood sacrifice rituals, sympathizers at the Haven enable the group to escape via railroad, and they arrive at a farmstead. Theo and Maus stay behind so that the baby can be born safely while the rest of the group continue on and eventually meet up with a Texan military group, who provide assistance to Peter and Amy in finding the Colorado outpost. The others stay with the military group, headed to Kerrville but are confronted with Babcock's "Many" heading over the mountain, so the core friends, along with Major Greer, decide to change course to head for the Colorado outpost instead. The bulk of the military group still continue to Kerrville. Once at the outpost, Peter discovers that it is the same compound where the outbreak started, and still serves as home to Sister Lacey. Lacey, like Amy, was treated by Lear with a modified form of the serum, providing her with longer life and a psychic bond with not only Amy and the virals, but Babcock as well.

It is decided they will lure Babcock into the outpost—Amy and Lacey confirm that he is headed towards them in any case—where they will detonate a nuclear device originally designed to sterilize the compound, but never used. The group theorize that the virals are like a hive mind and once Babcock is dead his hold over the virals created exponentially by him will cease and they will no longer be a threat. Lacey hands over files on The Twelve, revealing their hometowns, to which she suggests The Twelve will have returned. She also hands over a case of 12 syringes full of the modified serum. While waiting for Babcock to arrive, the group is attacked, resulting in Alicia ("Lish") becoming infected, and treated by Sara, Michael Fisher's sister and the former medic of the First Colony, with 1 of the 12 syringes of the modified serum.

Upon Babcock's arrival, Lacey lures him to a chamber where she detonates the bomb, destroying herself, Babcock, and much of the outpost. Once Babcock is dead, Amy is finally able to know the virals lives and gives them back memories, telling them who they are. The attacking virals all collapse and willingly wait for the sun to rise so they can die, in most cases leaving behind nothing but dust, proving the hive theory correct.

Lish adapts to the virus in a similar manner to Amy and Lacey before her, yet with differences—she has limited psychic abilities, but has the strength and endurance of a viral. Greer comments that she would be a formidable soldier—suggesting that Lish has become the first true "super soldier" that the government was trying to develop 93 years ago.

The group return to Theo and Maus at the farmstead, where the baby, named Caleb, has been born safely but they relay a strange story about being attacked by a viral and neither remembering killing it, though it has a shotgun blast through its chest. Peter and Lish realize the dead viral is actually Maus's husband, Galen Strauss who was turned since she left the Colony and either sought her out or just happened upon them at the farm. The friends stay for a while, making sure Theo and family have enough food stocked since Theo's leg was broken during the fight with the viral. The group begins discussing the idea of using the rest of the modified serum to raise more super soldiers to fight Zero, but Amy throws them all into the fire, citing concerns about sharing her miserable curse with other people and losing humanity. The next day the main group departs on foot, heading back to the First Colony, while Theo and his family, along with Hollis and Sara in the Humvee, head off to Kerrville.

Amy, Peter, Michael, Greer and Lish, after months of walking, return to the First Colony only to find it deserted, with no sign of what happened or where the colonists may have gone. There are two bodies, a victim of a suicide and that of Auntie, who seemingly died of old age. They decide to hunt down the remaining Twelve using Lear's files to determine their locations, and Lish as their primary weapon. That night Amy meets the infected Wolgast, outside the Colony.

The other group is able to meet up with the Texan Expeditionary force, and their remaining story is related through parts of Sara's diary—her last entry is at Roswell Base, and among comments about her own pregnancy she states that she can hear gunshots, and is going to investigate. This entry is presented as part of the future reference material, and is stated to have come from the site of "The Roswell Massacre". The novel ends ambiguously for all surviving characters.

== Expressions ==
Characters who are a part of the colony adopt unique slang and language over their isolation. These are designed to reinforce the simplicity of life the colonists are forced into - viewing everything in terms of survival and death.

The expression "All Eyes" is commonly used. Its connotations include a simple "be careful," but it is often extended into an expression that stresses deeper concerns and emotional connections. It is frequently used between characters with emotional ties, or comrades who have been on guard / scouting together for many years. It highlights a bond between them and understanding of the vast dangers around them. All Eyes is akin to the expression "keep your eyes open" much of the time. "Flyers" is also prevalent as a form of curse, although current traditional swear words are also used in a normal manner.

The term "gaps" is used interchangeably for pants or trousers, likely derived from the store from which they were foraged.

Time is measured in “hands” rather than hours.

Children and babies are referred to as “littles.”

The word “flyers” is used as a swear word.

== Characters ==
The protagonist of The Passage is Amy Harper Bellafonte, a child who is infected with a form of the virus and acquires some of the traits of the other infected (e.g. immortality), but does not acquire their bloodlust or their morphology. Despite being the primary protagonist, she is absent from several of the sub-books contained within the novel. Numerous individuals help Amy along her journey, including Brad Wolgast, an FBI agent whose job it is to procure people to be part of an experiment in which participants are infected with the virus, and, decades later, Peter Jaxon, a young man who lives in a tenuously surviving colony. There are several other characters from the First Colony, Alicia, Caleb, Theo, Mausami, and Sara, all of whom join Peter and Amy on their journey to Colorado. The primary antagonist is the viral known as Babcock, who was a death row inmate before being infected with the virus. Similarly to Amy, he is absent from a significant portion from the middle part of the novel. Babcock and the Twelve also play a significant role in this book and the sequel "The Twelve."

== Reception ==
Mark Medley of the National Post referred to The Passage as "Homeric", calling it "one of the creepiest books of 2010". The review also likened the novel to The Stand and referenced comparisons of Cronin to Michael Crichton. Publishers Weekly criticized Cronin's use of certain "tropes" of the genre, but added that "he manages to engage the reader with a sweeping epic style." Booklist said that the book was so similar to The Stand that it "required some fact-checking to ascertain it was not written under a new King pseudonym." USA Today said that The Passage "could be the best book of the summer." The New York Times Book Review said that The Passage is "A blockbuster…astutely plotted and imaginative". The Los Angeles Times said The Passage is "as stirring as it is epic", and even described a portion of the book as "nearly flawless", though it also describes some of the narration as "portentous and slack". The San Francisco Chronicle selected The Passage as one of the best science fiction and fantasy books of 2010, and describes the book as being "action packed" and "rousing".

The book has also been praised by numerous contemporary authors. Stephen King called The Passage "enthralling", and said that "It has the vividness that only epic works of fantasy and imagination can achieve." Dan Chaon called The Passage "hypnotic" and said that "you can’t turn the pages fast enough, and yet... you don’t want it to end." Jennifer Egan said that "Justin Cronin has written a wild, headlong, sweeping extravaganza of a novel. The Passage is the literary equivalent of a unicorn: a bonafide thriller that is sharply written, deeply humane, ablaze with big ideas, and absolutely impossible to put down." Danielle Trussoni called The Passage a "sweeping dystopian epic".

== Adaptation ==
Fox 2000 and Ridley Scott's Scott Free Productions purchased the movie rights to this novel for US$1.75 million in 2007, long before the book was completed. John Logan, writer of Scott's Gladiator (2000), was to write the movie's screenplay. According to Justin Cronin they were first focusing on one movie, but since he already mapped out the other two books, they knew what was coming next and they planned on three movies.

Scott Free eventually determined that the property would better serve as a television series and, in 2016, adapted the book series into a pilot for Fox. The pilot was written by Liz Heldens and produced by Matt Reeves. Jason Ensler directed the pilot; the show began shooting in metro Atlanta in the summer of 2018 and premiered in January 2019 on Fox. Mark-Paul Gosselaar plays Brad Wolgast, and Saniyya Sidney plays 10-year-old Amy Bellafonte.The Passage was cancelled after one season on May 10, 2019.
