= Nimbe =

2019 Nigerian film

- Directed by: Tope Alake
- Screenplay by: Ronke Gbede; Yakubu Moshood Olawale
- Based on: Jide, Jaido
- Produced by: Folarin Laosun
- Starring: Odunlade Adekola; Toyin Abraham; Rachael Okonkwo; Doyin Abiola; Rachael Okonkwo
- Cinematography: Segun Oladimaji
- Edited by: Mashood Sanusi
- Release date: 29 March 2019
- Running time: 110 minutes
- Country: Nigeria
- Language: English
- Budget: $100,000

Nimbe also known as Nimbe: The Movie is a 2019 Nigerian drama film directed by Tope Alake. The film stars Chimezie Imo, Toyin Abraham, Rachael Okonkwo and Doyin Abiola in the lead roles. The title role is played by the lead actor Chimezie Imo and the story is based on drug abuse. The film had its theatrical release in Nigeria on 29 March 2019 and received positive reviews from the critics. The film became a huge box office success and was one of the successful Nigerian films for the year 2019. The film currently occupies 59th position in the overall list of highest-grossing films in Nigeria. The film was also nominated for the 2019 UK Nollywood Film Festival Award.

== Cast ==
- Chimezie Imo as Nimbe
- Toyin Abraham as Uduak (Nimbe's mother)
- Rachael Okonkwo as Mira
- Doyin Abiola as Peju
- Odunlade Adekola as Bayo
- Sani Musa Danja as Abu
- Molawa Davis as Ralph
- Kelechi Udegbe as AK
- Broda Shaggi as Ginja
- Bukola Beecroft-Shofola as Mrs. Kpokobri

== Synopsis ==
The theme of the film revolves around a teenage boy Nimbe (Chimezie Imo) who is constantly jeered by his peers but fortunately finds consolation, love and relevance in a street gang he is introduced to by an elder neighbour he meets by chance. However, things change as he is introduced to the dangerous path of drug trafficking which becomes a turning point in his life. He experiences and witnesses the accompanying challenges, obstacles and consequences associated with drug abuse.
