= The Ferryman (novel) =

2023 novel by Justin Cronin

- Author: Justin Cronin
- Language: English
- Genre: Dystopian fiction
- Publisher: Ballantine Books
- Publication date: 2 May 2023
- Publication place: United States
- Pages: 560
- ISBN: 9780525619475

The Ferryman is a 2023 dystopian fiction novel by Justin Cronin. The protagonist, Proctor Bennett, is a titular "ferryman", responsible for transporting elderly citizens to be reborn. Proctor gradually realizes that his utopian life is not what it seems. The Ferryman is Cronin's first novel since 2016's The City of Mirrors.

== Plot ==
Cynthia and Malcolm Bennett live in the utopian archipelago of Prospera. The Bennetts adopt a 16-year-old boy named Proctor. Decades later, an aging Cynthia rows a boat away from her home and drowns herself.

As an adult, Proctor serves as the archipelago’s ferryman. He helps transport elderly citizens to the Nursery, where they have their memories wiped and are reborn as teenagers. Proctor is called to transport his father to the ferry. As they arrive at the docks, Malcolm becomes agitated and tries to flee. Malcolm whispers the word “Oranios” to Proctor before departing. As a result of this incident, Proctor is fired from his position as ferryman.

Thea Dimopolous, a Prosperan, is a member of an underground religious movement called the Arrivalists. The Arrivalists include both Prosperans and their service workers, who live on the Annex. Class conflict has recently grown between the impoverished workers and the wealthy Prosperans. Thea and Proctor sleep together while his wife Elise is away.

Proctor gives swimming lessons to a teenager named Caeli. Caeli calls Proctor and tells him that they won’t see each other for a while. Proctor deduces that Caeli is going to be forcibly sent to the Nursery to have her memory wiped. Thea and Proctor attempt to rescue Caeli. Proctor is captured and is forced to board the ferry. He escapes and is taken to the leader of the Arrivalists: his mother Cynthia, who had faked her own suicide. Proctor and his companions decide to sail away from Prospera, unsure if anything exists beyond their archipelago. As they pass the Nursery, they crash into a gravity-defying waterfall.

Proctor and Thea awaken to find themselves on the spaceship Oranios, having arrived at the planet Caelus. Proctor regains memories of life on Earth with Elise; they had a daughter named Caeli. At age four, Caeli drowned in the family’s pool. Proctor was the Director of the Prospera Corporation, which was seeking a second home for humanity after a climate crisis destroyed Earth. Many of the world’s billionaires paid to board this flight, along with tens of thousands of scientists. The entire experience of the Prosperans (billionaires) and their service workers (the scientists) has been a collective dream; it was necessary to keep the passengers dreaming to prevent them from going insane during cryostasis. Elise serves as the Designer, the linchpin holding the collective dream together. Elise, shattered by Caeli’s death, created a simulation without children and attempted to erase Caeli’s memory entirely.

On Oranios, Proctor and his companions learn that a group of conspirators including billionaire Otto Winspear decided to keep the simulation when the ship arrived at Caelus. These billionaires found Prospera preferable to reality. Proctor blames the billionaires for Earth’s destruction. He admits that he created the economic division between Prosperans and Annex workers so that the colonists would have a motive to eventually leave the simulation.

In Prospera, Otto is a high-ranking security agent. He stages a coup and assumes control of the archipelago’s government. Elise’s subconscious mind begins to remember Caeli, causing severe storms and threatening to shut down the simulation. Proctor and Thea return to the simulation to attempt to wake Elise. Meanwhile, Otto plans to send Elise to the Nursery. Instead of allowing her to be reborn, he will erase her and take her place as the new Designer. Just as the Arrivalist workers from the Annex begin a revolt against their Prosperan overlords, Proctor finds Elise. They remember Caeli together and the simulation ends.

The passengers on Oranios awaken and begin to colonize Caelus. The colonists include Thea, pregnant with Proctor’s child. Proctor, Elise, and the billionaires remain behind on Oranios. He serves as the Designer of a new simulation; he wipes his own memories of the real world and begins a new virtual life. The novel ends as Proctor and Elise celebrate Caeli’s eighth birthday in their new simulation, unaware that it is not real.

== Major themes ==
According to David Walton of the New York Journal of Books, The Ferryman is ultimately "about love and loss", being "crammed with parent-child relationships of many types: natural and adopted, through genetic or simply emotional ties, the parental relationship of a much older brother or a mentor or a friend or even a leader of a faction of rebels." Walton notes that even the descriptions of class conflict in the novel are reflected in parent-child relationships; the upper-class Prosperans adopt teenagers, but the lower-class Annex workers are able to give birth naturally. The review states that every parent-child relationship in the novel is eventually lost, and that "the emotional weight of enduring the loss of a parent or child weaves through every chapter of this novel".

According to Chelsea Leu of the New York Times, Cronin references The Tempest repeatedly, including motifs of "freak storms," the concept of enchanted islands, and the archipelago's namesake, Prospero. Prospero's speeches are directly quoted several times in the latter half of The Ferryman. Just as Shakespeare's Prospero was the puppet-master of his own enchanted island, Cronin uses the idea of "the Designed" to explore a "meta-commentary on the creative act itself".

== Background ==
In an interview with CNBC, Cronin noted that the COVID-19 pandemic changed the way that people think about crises and dystopia in general. When Cronin was a child, he imagined a global nuclear exchange that was "swift, all-encompassing and total, and it took about 40 minutes." In contrast, Cronin writes that slow-moving catastrophes such as pandemics and climate change are in "some ways harder to defend against because you can ignore them for a really, really long time". Cronin further commented that he drew inspiration from Elon Musk and his private space program, as well as income inequality and late-stage capitalism, when thinking about the ideas that became The Ferryman.

== Reception ==
A starred review for Kirkus called the book "a dystopian novel that doubles as a detective story". The review praised Proctor's characterization and the "authentically surprising" plot twists, calling the novel "another excellent offering from an author with a boundless imagination and talent to spare." Publishers Weekly also gave the novel a starred review. This review praised the novel's style, writing that Cronin "established the foundations for what appears to be a classic dystopian tale" but that the plot twists "[push] it into the realm of provocative conceptual science fiction". The review praised the characterization as well, calling the end result "a sensational speculative tale".

A review in Book Reporter called the novel "a tale full of relatable human experience and emotion". The same review noted that the reality of the final third of the book "is not always clearly rendered on the page, and the plot twists on itself a couple of times with a few weird or diversionary scenes". Writing for the New York Journal of Books, David Walton praised Cronin's prose and characterization, while calling the ending "lackluster" and "disappointing after the long setup". A review in the New York Times wrote that the story was engrossing and entertaining, but ultimately called it "an anodyne, occasionally beautiful diversion". A review for the Washington Post praised the worldbuilding of the first half of the novel, but felt that the "topsy-turvy thriller is torn apart by the unsustainable imbalance between its profound intentions and its ultimately silly execution".

Writing for Tor.com, Vanessa Armstrong stated that Proctor was a privileged and unlikeable protagonist. She criticized the novel's treatment of female characters: "Women in this novel serve as mere support structures to Proctor, and with one notable exception, the main female characters in the book are either his mother or someone he has sex with." Armstrong concluded that the novel was not "a memorable or even worthwhile read".
