= One Too Many (2022 film) =

2022 Nigerian film

- Theatrical poster of One Too Many
- Directed by: Kayode Kasum
- Produced by: Atinuke Akinde, Joy Grant Ekong
- Starring: Chimezie Imo, Jide Kosoko, Tope Tedela, Dakore Akande, Rachael Oniga
- Distributed by: Netflix
- Release date: 8 November 2022
- Running time: 1hr 31mins
- Country: Nigeria
- Language: English

One Too Many is a 2022 Nigerian drama film distributed by Netflix. It was directed by Kayode Kasum, produced by Atinuke Akinde and Joy Grant Ekong, and shot in Ibadan, Nigeria.

== Plot summary ==
Adesuwa comes from a poor family. She gets raped by a police officer while returning from an errand. Hee father had been previously shot by a police officer in the leg. She gets pregnant and delivers a boy named Otas. Otas finishes his university education and prepares for his NYSC service. He visits his best friend Eric. They quarrel over cheating as Otas saw Eric with his girlfriend. During their journey, both goes with Eric's car, whose father is senator Makinde. While in the car, Otas calls his mother through video call. He unintentionally leaves the phone while it is recording. After he sees smoking weed and a gun in Eric's car, he asks him to pull over. As both moves out of the car, arguing and struggling with the gun, Eric gets shot at the spot. A police van is at the back of their car even before the shooting, hence two police men comes out and arrests Otas.

Adesuwa calls her son's number but it isn't connecting. She sees on television about her son's arrest. The following day, she goes to the police station and pleads with senator Makinde, who turns her down. Adesuwa discovers her som had left his phone recording. She hides the proof from police officer Lekan, who was among the people who raped her. After Adesuwa comforts Lekan, he threatens to arrest her too citing he is above the law. Unbeknownst to him, Adesuwa records his words and create a viral video. Lekan gets arrested and the charges against Otas gets withdrawn by Senator Makinde after Otas shows the court the video he recorded with his phone. Senator Makinde invites Otas to a dinner, where Otas reveals a website he creates for his deceased friend Eric.

== Background ==
One Too Many was written by Ginika Ozioko and Jeanine Okafor. It was shot in Ibadan and some part of the University of Ibadan. The film concluded its principal photography in 2021, and Adeoluwa Owu the cinematographer.

== Cast ==
- Chimezie Imo as Otas
- Dakore Akande as Adesuwa
- Jide Kosoko as Senator Sodiku
- Rachael Oniga as Honourable Makinde
- Funsho Adeolu as DSP Lekan
- Tope Tedela as Barrister Thomas
- Paul Utomi as Barrister Aminu
- Omowunmi Dada as Ehi
- Joshua Richard as Eric

== Reception ==
One Too Many was screened during the Africa International Film Festival in 2022. It was rated 2.5/5 by Afrocritik's Seyi Lasisi, who thought the film's attempt to address the Nigerian criminal justice system was "commendable" but ultimately lacking. Nollywood Reinvented's Kolapo Mustapha said in a review that "Kayode Kasum's direction of One Too Many showcased promising elements for a compelling narrative but ultimately faltered in execution." Business Day's Linda Ochugbua thought it "was a very sweet and touching Nigerian story".

== See also ==
- List of Nigerian films
