= Kasala (film) =

2018 Nigerian comedy film

- Directed by: Ema Edosio
- Screenplay by: Temi Sodipo
- Produced by: Eric Maydieu
- Starring: Gabriel Afolayan; Emeka Nwagbaraocha; Judith Audu; Jide Kosoko; Sambasa Nzeribe; Tomiwa Tegbe
- Cinematography: Ema Edosio
- Edited by: Ayodele Adekoya; Ema Edosio
- Production company: Bliss Productions
- Release date: 12 October 2018
- Running time: 84 min
- Country: Nigeria
- Language: English

Kasala is a 2018 Nigerian comedy drama film directed by Ema Edosio. The film stars Gabriel Afolayan, Judith Audu, Emeka Nwagbaraocha, Jide Kosoko and Sambasa Nzeribe. The film was released on 12 October 2018, but was only accepted for screening in cinemas by December 2018 and premiered on Netflix on 31 January 2020.

== Plot ==
Tunji, a quick-talking young man, along with his friends Chikodi, Effiong and Abraham, takes his uncle's vehicle for a joyride. Things go wrong when they crash the vehicle and have only five hours to raise the money needed to fix it before Tunji's uncle returns from work.

== Cast ==
- Emeka Nwagbaraocha as Tunji
- Tomiwa Tegbe as Effiong
- Chimezie Imo as Abraham
- Kassim Abiodun as Tunji's uncle
- Jide Kosoko as uncle's boss / big boss
- Gabriel Afolayan as laundryman
- Mike Afolarin as Chikodi
- Abayomi Alvin as bully
- Judith Audu as Emem
- Iyele Chibueze as bully 2
- Adenipekun Harmoney as neighbour
- Phill Okafor as Egbon
- Sambasa Nzeribe as Bambi
- Pelumi Sharayi as Shalewa
- Kolade Shasi as mechanic
