= The Wait (2021 film) =

2021 Nigerian drama film by Yemi Morafa

- Directed by: Yemi Morafa and Fiyin Gambo
- Written by: Tomi Adesina
- Produced by: Tolu LordTanner
- Starring: Nse Ikpe Etim; Deyemi Okanlawon; Jimmy Odukoya; Chimezie Imo; Aisha Sanni-Shittu
- Cinematography: Filmwox
- Edited by: Adekunle Bryan
- Music by: Bayo Adepetun
- Production companies: Eventful and Lordtanner studios
- Distributed by: Filmone distribution
- Release date: 30 April 2021
- Running time: 122 minutes
- Country: Nigeria
- Language: English
- Budget: N45 million

The Wait is a 2021 Nigerian faith-based drama film directed by Yemi Morafa and Fiyin Gambo, and produced by Tolu LordTanner. The film stars Nse Ikpe Etim, Deyemi Okanlawon, Jimmy Odukoya, Ini Dima-Okojie, Meg Otanwa, Chimezie Imo and Aisha Sanni-Shittu. The film is based on God's Waiting Room, a faith-based book written by Nigerian lawyer Yewande Zaccheaus. The film had its theatrical release on 30 April 2021 and received mixed reviews from critics.

== Cast ==
- Nse Ikpe Etim as Dr. Nara
- Ini Dima-Okojie as Nkechi
- Deyemi Okanlawon as Bayo
- Jimmy Odukoya as Akin
- Chimezie Imo as Somto
- Joke Silva as Akin's mom
- Kate Henshaw as Tilewa
- 2 Milly Star as Larry
- Meg Otanwa as Tosan
- Uche Chika Elumelu as Amaka
- Aisha Sanni-Shittu as Alhaja Aisha
- Juliana Olayode as Funbi
- Kalu George as Mr. Okeke
- Mike Afolarin as Essien
- Demi Banwo as Don Shaffa
- Anee Icha as Tamilore
- Ifeanyi Akogo as Mr. Sosan
- Ope Ade-Agbo as Kachi
