= Head Over Bills =

- Starring: Shaffy Bello; Bimbo Ademoye; Uzor Arukwe; Mofe Duncan; Anita Joseph.; Rachel Okonkwo
- Release date: 2022
- Country: Nigeria
- Language: English

Head Over Bills is a 2022 Nigerian romantic film that explores the lives of three sisters and their mother's struggles. Produced by Dabby Chimere, the film features Shaffy Bello, Adesua Etomi, Uzor Arukwe, Racheal Okonkwo and others.

== Plot ==
The film, which has a running time of 2 hours and 30 minutes, narrates the lifestyle of three sisters and the struggles and pain of their single mother, who has faced numerous challenges to provide her daughters with a befitting life, but they take the opportunities for granted. Through it all, their mother challenged them to change their ways and become better people or face serious consequences. In pursuit of these changes, the sisters adopt new values, find love, lose it, and eventually rediscover themselves.

== Cast ==
- Shaffy Bello as Mrs. Ofili
- Bimbo Ademoye as Cheta
- Edward Kehinde Adebiyi as Kamsi
- Annes Anaekwe as Sandra
- Rachael Okonkwo as Oluchi
- Uzor Arukwe as Jesse
- Mofe Duncan as Tobor
- Anita Joseph as Evelyn
- Prince Nelson Enwerem as Leo
- Ego Nwosu as Muna
- Emeka Nwagbaraocha as Michael
- Jessica Tse as younger Mrs. Ofili
- MC Mbakara as Nicholas
- Oluchi Kalu as secretary
- Uzoma Nkemjika as Chief
- DJ Barbie
- Alex Ajoku as Niyi
- Cross
