= The Governor (Nigerian TV series) =

2016 Nigerian television series

- Genre: Political drama
- Written by: Yinka Ogun, Tunde Babalola, Debo Oluwatuminu
- Directed by: Ema Edosio
- Starring: Caroline Chikezie, Samuel Abiola, Jude Chukwuka, Kunle Coker, Taiwo Obileye, Bimbo Manuel
- Music by: Michael "Truth" Ogunlade
- Country of origin: Nigeria
- Original language: English
- No. of episodes: 13

Production
- Producer: Mo Abudu
- Running time: 45 minutes

Original release
- Release: 2016

The Governor is a 2016 Nigerian political drama television series. It was directed by Ema Edosio, written by Yinka Ogun, Tunde Babalola, and Debo Oluwatuminu, and produced by Mo Abudu. The series, set in the fictional state of Savannah, was filmed in Calabar and Cross River State. It consists of 13 episodes,

== Premiere ==
The series premiered on 7 July 2016 on the DStv at 9pm.

== Cast ==
- Caroline Chikezie as Angela Ochello
- Samuel Abiola as Toju Ochello
- Jude Chukwuka as Chief Sobifa Thomson
- Kunle Coker as Senator Briggs
- Taiwo Obileye as Chief Momo-Ali
- Bimbo Manuel as David Ochello
- Kachi Nnochiri as Ahmed Halo
- Lord Frank as Henry Duke
- Kelechi Udegbe as Paul
- Ani iyoho as Musa
- Edmond Enaibe as Friday Bello

== Synopsis ==
Angela Ochello – the deputy Governor of the fictional Savannah state – finds herself in a cornered situation following the governor's sudden death. She was able to rule the office with the help of her chief of staff while her matrimonial home does not suffer.

== Reception ==
According to fans, The Governor's coverage of politics is educational. Coker described it as a must-watch for everyone planning to venture into politics.

== Episodes ==
1. The Offer
2. The Signing
3. The Announcement
4. The Assertion
5. The Strike
6. The Compromise
7. Siege
8. Atoke Road
9. To Catch a Monkey
10. The Business of Politics
11. Two-Thirds
12. Twilight
13. End Games

== See also ==
- Mo Abudu
- Ebonylife TV
- Chief Daddy 2
