= House of Ga'a =

2024 Nigerian historical drama film

- Directed by: Bolanle Austen-Peters
- Written by: Tunde Babalola
- Starring: Femi Branch; Mike Afolarin; Funke Akindele; Toyin Abraham; Stan Nze; Bimbo Manuel; Lateef Adedimeji
- Production company: BAP Productions
- Distributed by: Netflix
- Release date: July 26, 2024
- Running time: 120 minutes
- Country: Nigeria
- Languages: Yoruba; English

House of Ga'a is a 2024 Nigerian historical drama film directed by Bolanle Austen-Peters and written by Tunde Babalola. It features an ensemble cast including Femi Branch, Bimbo Manuel, Stan Nze, Lateef Adedimeji, Mike Afolarin, Toyin Abraham and Funke Akindele.

== Synopsis ==
Set in a historical period in the Oyo Empire of around the 18th century, House of Ga'a delves into the tumultuous ascent to power of a ruthless Prime Minister consumed by vengeance who stops at nothing to eclipse the kings he once served. With an insatiable thirst for power, he embarks on a ruthless journey to surpass the very monarchs he pledged loyalty to. The narrative explores themes of ambition, betrayal, and the complex interplay of power dynamics within a royal court.

== Cast ==
- Femi Branch as Bashorun Ga'a
- Mike Afolarin as Oyemekun
- Funke Akindele as Ayinba
- Toyin Abraham as Edan Asiko
- Ibrahim Chatta as Sasa L'eniyan
- Teddy A. as Ojo Agubambaro
- Stan Nze as Nupe Commander
- Femi Adebayo as Olukuoye
- Fasakin Adebesi as Oyomesi Chief
- Ali Nuhu as Seriki
- Gabriel Afolayan as Oluke
- Lateef Adedimeji as Olubu
- Adeniyi Johnson as Alaafin Abiodun
- Bimbo Manuel as Ashipa
- Nifemi Lawal as Young Ga'a
- Gbenga Titiloye as Alaafin Agboluaje
- Kunle Coker as Alaafin Labisi
- Muyiwa Ademola as Alaafin Awonbioju
- Tosin Adeyemi as Zeinab
- William Benson as Gbagi
- Yemi Blaq as Aare Ona Kakanfo
- Peju Ogunmola as Iyaloja

== Release and reception ==
The movie was officially released on Netflix on 26 July 2024. Enitan Abdultawab of Vanguard give it a 8/10 rating, praising the casting, cinematography and plot. Stephen Onu of Premium Times praised Femi Branch's portrayal of Bashorun Ga'a. Onu noted that: "Branch's unique gestural dispositions speak more than words, as his acting, portraying the character Bashorun Ga'a, was apt and flawless—a proud tyrant who met his doom unprecedentedly." Onu concluded: "This captivating tale entertains while delivering a didactic lesson about the perils of unchecked ambition. It is worthy of emulation for its excellent delivery and brilliant storytelling."

In a less positive review, Chima Ugo of The Board gave it 6/10 rating concluding that, "The film's portrayal of military command structures, individual characters, and historical timelines highlights significant inaccuracies that impact its overall authenticity."
