= When Nigeria Happens =

- Directed by: Ema Edosio
- Screenplay by: Bayo Oduwole; Adebayo Oduwole
- Starring: Ego; Alex Usifo; Jide Kene Achufusi; Seun Ajayi; Toyin Oshinaike
- Release date: 2025

When Nigeria Happens is a 2025 Nigerian dance‑drama film written and directed by Ema Edosio. It follows a group of young street dancers in Lagos, Nigeria whose pursuit of art collides with harsh social and economic realities. The film opened the Open Doors section of the Locarno Film Festival in 2025.

== Plot ==
The film centres on six misfit dancers (Fagbo, Pocco, Lighter, Movement, Colos and Poppy) who use dance as an act of freedom and resistance in contemporary Lagos. As Fagbo's mother becomes critically ill, he is forced into a series of difficult choices to pay for her care while the group struggles to keep its artistic dreams alive under mounting pressures.

== Cast ==
- Abella Domdom Dominic as Fagbo
- Ruth El Phygo Felix as Pocco
- Enumah Oliseh as Colos
- Eze Gift Chinedu as Movement
- Deborah Aiyegbeni as Lighter
- David Emmanuel as Poppi
- Ego Iheanacho as Fagbo's mother
- Alex Usifo Omiagbo as Senator Kalaro
- Jide Kene Achufusi as Evian
- Seun Ajayi as James
- Imoh Eboh as Stella
- Toyin Oshinaike as Baba
- Casmir Chibuike as chief security
- Eric Nwanso as commandant
- Bikiya Graham Douglas as doctor
- Psalms Skot as police superintendent
- Waliu Fagbemi as front desk police officer

== Festivals ==
When Nigeria Happens had its world premiere at the Locarno Film Festival, where it opened the Open Doors section focused on cinema from emerging regions. The film also screened at Ake Arts & Book Festival in Lagos.
