= Rachael Okonkwo =

Nigerian Actress/ Public Speaker

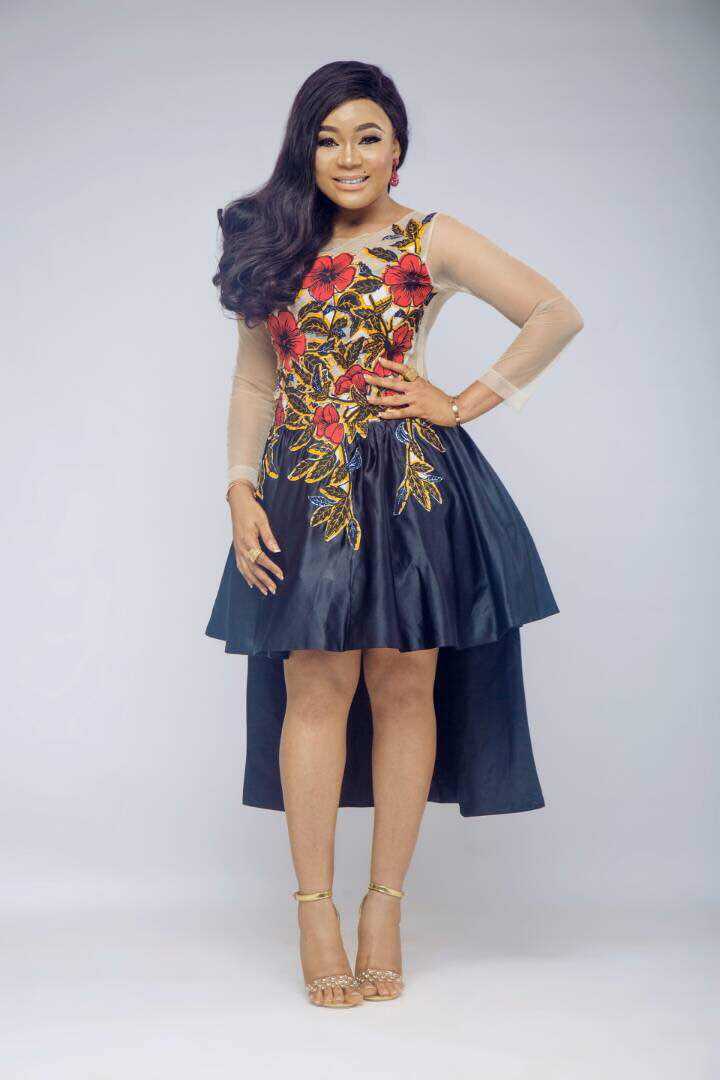
- Born: Nnenna Rachael Okonkwo; 26 May 1987 (age 39); Uzo Uwani, Enugu, Nigeria
- Other name: Nkoli
- Education: University of Nigeria
- Occupations: Film actress; dancer
- Years active: 2008–present
- Known for: Nkoli Nwa Nsukka
- Website: nkolinwansukka.com

Nnenna Rachael Okonkwo// (born 26 May 1987), popularly known as Nkoli Nwa Nsukka, is a Nigerian film actress. She is best known for her leading role in the film of the same name. She serves as a brand ambassador for Aquadon Water.

== Education ==
Okonkwo is from Ukpata in Uzo Uwani Local Government Area of Enugu State, Nigeria. She studied at the University of Nigeria, Nsukka.

== Career ==
Okonkwo began acting as a child, but due to a lack of movie roles she switched to dancing. Okonkwo joined Nollywood in 2007 playing very minor roles. In 2008, she played a supporting role to Ini Edo and Van Vicker in Royal War 2, and in 2010, she featured alongside Patience Ozokwor and John Okafor in Open and Close 1&2. Her first major role and subsequent breakthrough came in 2014, where she played the lead character, Nkoli, in Nkoli Nwa Nsukka. Okonkwo and Chigozie Atuanya were unveiled as Luter Ambassadors at a ceremony in Lagos.

== Humanitarian activities ==
=== Children's Easter Carnival ===
Okonkwo hosts an annual carnival which aimed providing free gifts to children and entertainment to the people. She says it enables her to interact with her fans. In 2015, Okonkwo hosted the first edition of the children's Easter Carnival aimed at giving free gifts to kids during the Easter celebration in Enugu. In 2016, the second edition which was held in Onitsha had even more turnout as she was accompanied by fellow actors like Ken Erics among others to the event. The 2017 edition which was held in her city of birth Nsukka was able to gather over 5,000 people, featured even more celebrities like Angela Okorie, Nonso Diobi, Slowdog, Ken Erics, Nani Boi, Eve Esin and supported by top brands enabled it to be an even bigger event than its predecessors.

== Personal life ==
Okonkwo received an endorsement deal with Phamatex Industries Limited. She hosts her charity event in Nsukka, Enugu State. In an interview, Okonkwo stated that she loves Nigerian men. She lost her mother in July 2020.

== Awards ==
Year	Award	Category	Result	Notes
2016	City People Entertainment Awards	Best Supporting Actress	Nominated	
2015	Karis Media Awards.	Best Comic Actress of the Year	Nominated	
2015	City People Entertainment Awards	Best Supporting Actress of the year (English)	Nominated	
2018	Department of English And Literary Studies (University of Nigeria, Nsukka)	Award of Recognition	Nominated	

== Selected filmography ==
Year	Film	Role	Notes
2022	Head Over Bills	Oluchi	
2020	The Miracle Centre		
2020	Small Chops	Uzo	
2019	The Ghost and the Tout		
2019	Nimbe	Mira	
2019	Survival of Jelili		
2017	Teri Teri		
2017	Arthur One Eye	Amanda	
2017	Onwa Na South		
2017	Left Over		Starring Regina Daniels
2017	Zee World Madness	Kasarachi	Starring Eve Esin, Nonso Diobi
2016	University Girls	Joy	Starring Queen Nwokoye, Eve Esin
2016	Vale of Tears	Ola	Starring Yul Edochie, Chiwetalu Agu
2016	Not My Child	Nneka Jnr	Starring Walter Anga
2016	Ojawa-Nwa	Orjiugo	
2015	Justify My Love	Mary	Starring Tonto Dikeh
2015	Eno my calabar love	Peace	Starring Ini Edo, Osita Iheme
2015	Ijele the princess of fire	Ijele	
2015	Local Prostitute	Chinwe	Starring Patience Ozokwor
2015	Please leave my husband	Mercy	Starring Ken Erics, Eve Esin
2015	Tears Of Betrayal	Asanwa	Starring Diamond Okechi
2015	The Gods Anger	Chinwe	Starring Patience Ozokwor,
2015	Ogidi	Olamma	Zack Orji, Ebele Okaro
2014	Bloody War	Janet	Starring Ken Erics, Ngozi Ezeonu
2014	Paw Paw the guitar boy	Ada	Starring Osita Iheme, Michael Godson
2014	Nkoli Nwa Nsukka	Nkoli	
2013	Sister Esther	Loveth	
2010	Open & Close	Anulika	Starring John Okafor, Patience Ozokwor
2008	Royal War 2	Amaka	Starring THOMPSON, Van Vicker
