= Emamode Edosio =

Nigerian film maker and film director

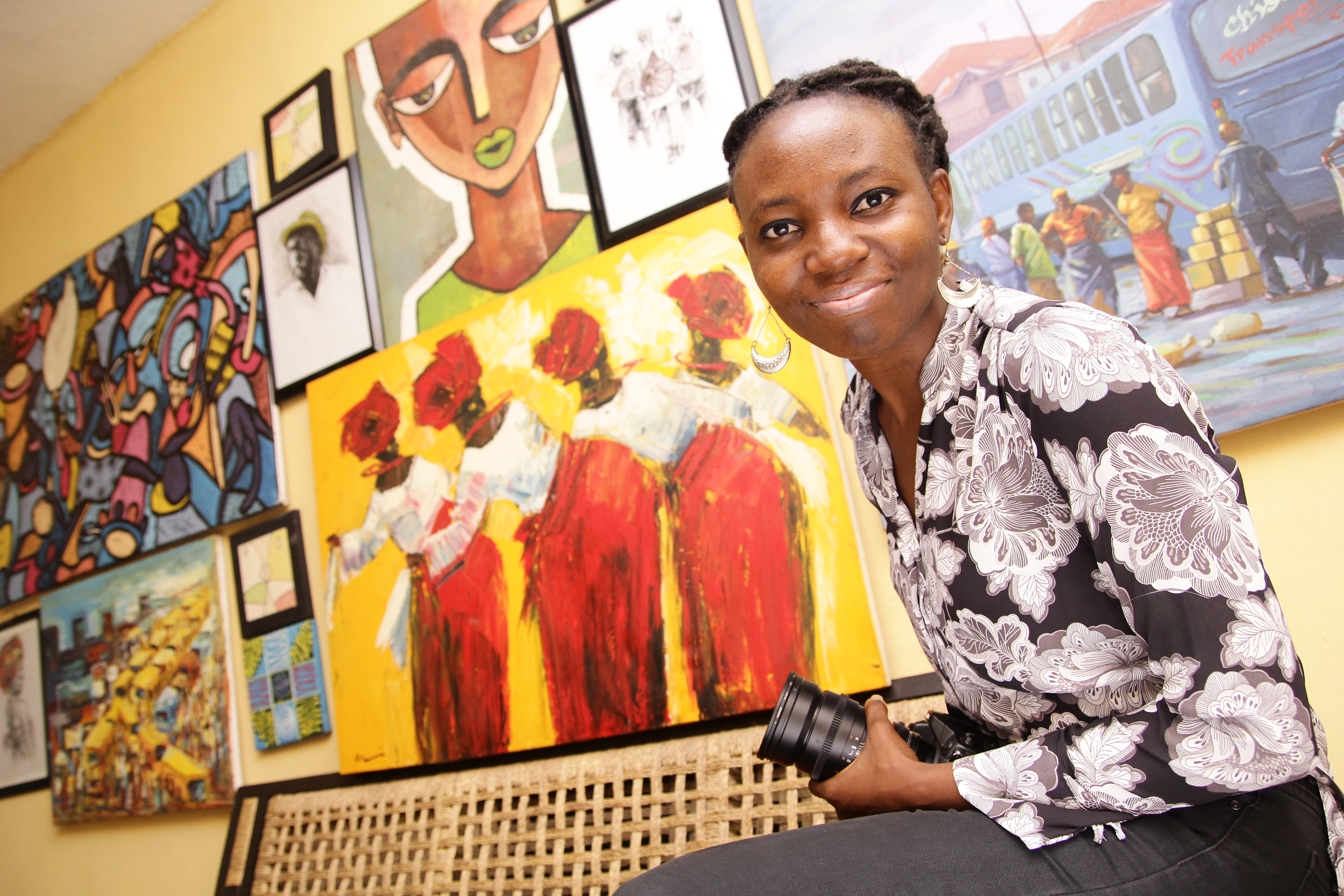
- Other name: Ema
- Education: Olabisi Onabanjo University
- Occupations: Filmmaker, music video director, cinematographer
- Years active: 2013–present
- Known for: Filmmaking and directing
- Emamode Edosio's voice In a 2018 broadcast Recorded 27 April 2018
- Website: www.emaedosio.com

Emamode Edosio, popularly known as Ema, is a Nigerian filmmaker and film director.

== Early life and education ==
Edosio started her education at Loral Nursery and Primary School, Festac town, Lagos after which she proceeded to the Federal Government College, Odogbolu for a few years before concluding her secondary education at S-tee Private Academy, Festac Town.

Edosio studied cinematography and directing at the Motion Pictures Institute of Michigan and the New York Film Academy.

== Career ==
She worked for BBC Africa, Deutsche Welle, and Bloomberg, and directed popular television programs for major Nigerian networks.

She worked as a series director on The Governor by EbonyLife TV and series director on Skinny Girl in Transit Season 3 by Ndani TV. She also worked as a film director for Bloomberg Philanthropies and cinematographer for Vice News.

She is the founder of City Gates Film Production.

== Filmography ==
- The Governor (TV series) (2016)
- Kasala (2018)
- Otiti (2022)
- When Nigeria Happens (2025)

== See also ==
- List of Nigerian film producers
- List of Nigerian cinematographers
