= Justin Cronin =

American author

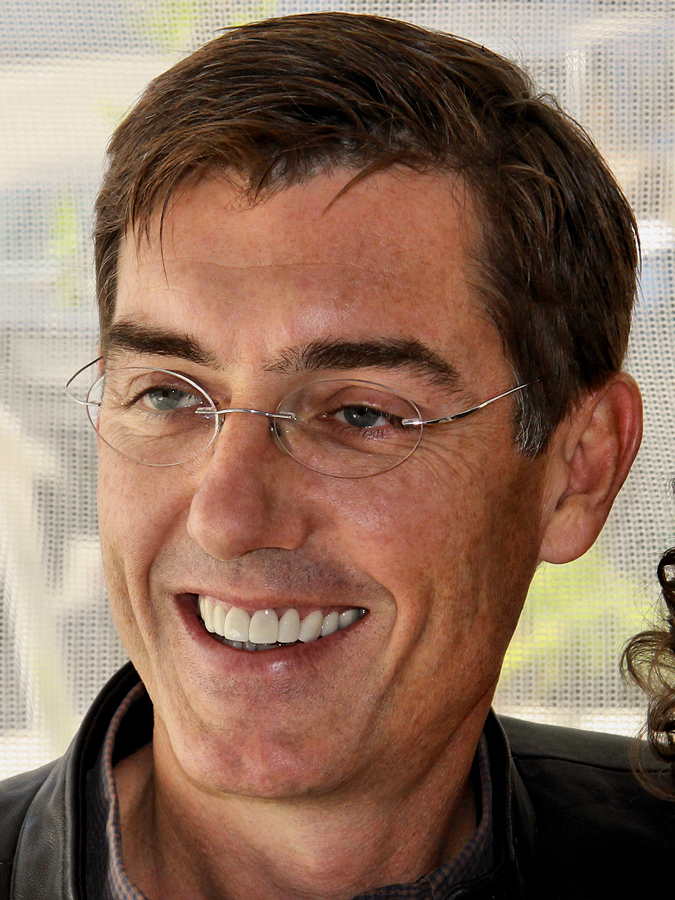
- Cronin at the 2012 Texas Book Festival
- Born: 1962 (age 63–64); New England, United States
- Occupations: Novelist, English professor
- Writing career
- Genres: Horror, Science fiction

Justin Cronin (born 1962) is an American author. He has written six novels: Mary and O'Neil, The Ferryman, and The Summer Guest, as well as a vampire trilogy consisting of The Passage, The Twelve and The City of Mirrors. He has won the PEN/Hemingway Award for Debut Novel, the Stephen Crane Prize, and a Whiting Award.

Born and raised in New England, Cronin is a graduate of Harvard University and the Iowa Writers’ Workshop. He taught creative writing and was the "Author in-residence" at La Salle University in Philadelphia, Pennsylvania, from 1992 to 2003. He is a former professor of English at Rice University, and he lives with his wife and children in Houston, Texas.

In July 2007, Variety reported that Fox 2000 had bought the screen rights to Cronin's vampire trilogy. The first book of the series, The Passage, was released in June 2010. It garnered mainly favorable reviews. The book has been adapted by Fox into a television series, with Cronin credited as a co-producer.

== Bibliography ==
- A Short History of the Long Ball (1990)
- Mary and O'Neil (2001) – Winner of the PEN/Hemingway Award and The Stephen Crane Prize from Book of the Month Club
- The Summer Guest (2004)
- The Passage (2010) (Book 1 of The Passage Trilogy)
- The Twelve (2012) (Book 2 of The Passage Trilogy)
- The City of Mirrors (2016) (Book 3 of The Passage Trilogy)
- The Ferryman (2023)
