= The Mistress of Spices =

The Mistress of Spices may refer to:

- The Mistress of Spices (novel), a 1997 book by Chitra Banerjee Divakaruni
- The Mistress of Spices (film), a 2005 film based on the novel
