= The Passage (TV series) =

2019 American thriller television series

- Genre: Thriller
- Created by: Liz Heldens
- Based on: The Passage by Justin Cronin
- Starring: Mark-Paul Gosselaar; Saniyya Sidney; Jamie McShane; Caroline Chikezie; Emmanuelle Chriqui; Brianne Howey; McKinley Belcher III; Henry Ian Cusick; Vincent Piazza
- Composers: Jeff Russo; Jordan Gagne
- Country of origin: United States
- Original language: English
- No. of seasons: 1
- No. of episodes: 10

Production
- Executive producers: Liz Heldens; Matt Reeves; David W. Zucker; Adam Kassan; Ridley Scott
- Cinematography: Ramsey Nickell; Byron Shah
- Editors: Pietro Cecchini; Kelley Dixon; Christopher S. Capp
- Running time: 44 minutes
- Production companies: 20th Century Fox Television; 6th & Idaho; Selfish Mermaid; Scott Free Productions

Original release
- Network: Fox
- Release: January 14 – March 11, 2019

The Passage is an American thriller television series based on the trilogy of novels by Justin Cronin. It spans years in the life of Amy Bellafonte, as she moves from being manipulated in a government conspiracy to protecting humankind in a post-apocalyptic vampire future. The series premiered on January 14, 2019. The Passage was cancelled after one season on May 10, 2019.

== Synopsis ==
The Passage focuses on Project Noah, a secret medical facility where scientists are experimenting with a dangerous virus that could lead to the cure for all disease, but also carries the potential to wipe out the human race. When a young girl, Amy Bellafonte, is chosen to be a test subject, Federal Agent Brad Wolgast is tasked with bringing her to Project Noah. Ultimately, however, Wolgast becomes her surrogate father, as he tries to protect her at any cost. Brad and Amy's journey will force them to confront Project Noah's lead scientist, Major Nichole Sykes, and the hardened ex-CIA operative in charge of operations, Clark Richards, whom Brad trained. It likewise brings them face-to-face with a dangerous new race of beings confined within the walls of Project Noah, including former scientist Tim Fanning and death-row inmate Shauna Babcock. As Project Noah's scientists home in on a cure that could save humanity, these new beings begin to test their own powers, inching one step closer to an escape that could lead to an unimaginable apocalypse.

== Cast ==
- Mark-Paul Gosselaar as Brad Wolgast
- Saniyya Sidney as Amy Bellafonte
- Jamie McShane as Tim Fanning, a medical doctor and philanthropist
- Caroline Chikezie as Nichole Sykes, a military doctor who heads Project Noah
- Emmanuelle Chriqui as Lila Kyle
- Brianne Howey as Shauna Babcock
- McKinley Belcher III as Anthony Carter
- Henry Ian Cusick as Jonas Lear, a doctor
- Vincent Piazza as Clark Richards

== Production ==
=== Development ===
In July 2007, Fox 2000 Pictures paid $1.75 million for the film rights to The Passage by Justin Cronin. In September 2009, John Logan was announced to be writing a screenplay with Ridley Scott attached to direct. In April 2011, Matt Reeves was announced as director. In June 2011, Jason Keller was hired to rewrite Logan's screenplay. The producers decided that the project would work better as a television series and in November 2016, Fox gave a pilot production commitment. Reeves said that the book was "not adaptable as a movie". In January 2017, Fox ordered the pilot. In August 2017, Fox Entertainment president David Madden told Deadline that there would be potential re-shoots to the pilot. In February 2018, it was revealed that there would be re-shoots of the pilot, to take place in March in Atlanta. In May 2018, Fox ordered the pilot to series.

=== Casting ===
In June 2017, Mark-Paul Gosselaar, Saniyya Sidney, Genesis Rodriguez, Brianne Howey, B. J. Britt and Jennifer Ferrin were announced to have been cast in the pilot. On February 8, 2018, it was announced that the characters played by Rodriguez, Britt and Ferrin would be written out of the show and that three new characters, Tim Fanning, Nichole Sykes and Lila Kyle, would be added. On February 14, 2018, Jamie McShane was cast as Fanning while Caroline Chikezie was cast as Sykes. The next day Emmanuelle Chriqui was cast as Kyle.

== Episodes ==
No.	Title	Directed by	Written by	Original release date	Prod. code	U.S. viewers (millions)
1	"Pilot"	Jason Ensler & Marcos Siega	Liz Heldens	January 14, 2019	1LAK01	5.23
2	"You Owe Me a Unicorn"	Jason Ensler	Liz Heldens	January 21, 2019	1LAK02	4.23
3	"That Never Should Have Happened to You"	Jason Ensler	Peter Elkoff	January 28, 2019	1LAK03	3.95
4	"Whose Blood is That?"	Allison Liddi-Brown	Daniel Thomsen	February 4, 2019	1LAK04	3.80
5	"How You Gonna Outrun the End of the World?"	Jeffrey Nachmanoff	Joy Blake	February 11, 2019	1LAK05	3.66
6	"I Want to Know What You Taste Like"	Jessica Lowrey	Dennis Saldua	February 18, 2019	1LAK06	3.51
7	"You Are like the Sun"	Eduardo Sanchez	Kate Erickson	February 25, 2019	1LAK07	3.30
8	"You Are Not That Girl Anymore"	Ti West	Peter Elkoff & C.A. Johnson	March 4, 2019	1LAK08	3.38
9	"Stay in the Light"	Jason Ensler	Daniel Thomsen & Vanessa Gomez	March 11, 2019	1LAK09	3.12
10	"Last Lesson"	Mark Tonderai	Liz Heldens & Joy Blake	March 11, 2019	1LAK10	3.05

== Reception ==
=== Critical reception ===
The series holds an approval rating of 62% based on 26 reviews, with an average rating of 7.02/10 on Rotten Tomatoes. The website's critical consensus reads, "Strong performances from leads Mark-Paul Gosselaar and Saniyya Sidney can't course correct The Passage's wayward plot and feeble tone." Metacritic, which uses a weighted average, assigned the series a score of 62 out of 100 based on 17 critics.

Lucy Mangan of The Guardian praised the father–daughter dynamic between Brad and Amy and the series' execution of a "daft" storyline. Alison Herman, writing for The Ringer, said that the novels were a poor fit for network television and criticized some of the show's deviations from the source material.

=== Ratings ===
Viewership and ratings per episode of The Passage
No.	Title	Air date	Rating/share (18–49)	Viewers (millions)	DVR (18–49)	DVR viewers (millions)	Total (18–49)	Total viewers (millions)
1	"Pilot"	January 14, 2019	1.3/6	5.23	0.9	3.47	2.2	8.70
2	"You Owe Me a Unicorn"	January 21, 2019	1.0/5	4.23	0.9	3.25	1.9	7.56
3	"That Never Should Have Happened To You"	January 28, 2019	0.9/4	3.95	0.8	2.80	1.7	6.75
4	"Whose Blood is That?"	February 4, 2019	0.9/4	3.80	0.9	2.99	1.8	6.83
5	"How You Gonna Outrun The End of The World?"	February 11, 2019	0.9/4	3.66	0.8	2.77	1.7	6.43
6	"I Want To Know What You Taste Like"	February 18, 2019	0.9/4	3.51	0.7	2.64	1.6	6.15
7	"You Are like the Sun"	February 25, 2019	0.8/4	3.30	0.8	2.61	1.6	5.91
8	"You Are Not That Girl Anymore"	March 4, 2019	0.9/4	3.38	0.7	2.61	1.5	6.00
9	"Stay in the Light"	March 11, 2019	0.8/4	3.12	0.6	2.17	1.4	5.30
10	"Last Lesson"	March 11, 2019	0.7/3	3.05	0.6	2.21	1.3	5.27
