= The Passage (novel series) =

Novel series by Justin Cronin

The cover of the first book in the series

The Passage is a novel series by Justin Cronin. There are three published books in the series. The film rights were acquired by Fox Entertainment Group in 2007 for adaptation into a film trilogy, but after 12 years of development and planning, it was changed to a television series, which premiered in January 2019 and was canceled after the first season.

== The Passage ==
The Passage was published in 2010 by Ballantine Books, a division of Random House, Inc., New York. The Passage debuted at #3 on the New York Times hardcover fiction best seller list, and remained on the list 7 additional weeks. It is the first novel of the trilogy.

== The Twelve ==
The Twelve is a 2012 horror novel by Justin Cronin and is the second novel in the trilogy. The novel was published on October 16, 2012, by Ballantine Books.

== The City of Mirrors ==
The City of Mirrors was released in the United States on May 24. 2016.
