= Chimezie Imo =

Nigerian actor and model (born 1990)

- Born: 7 January 1990 (age 36); Imo, Nigeria
- Occupations: Actor, producer
- Notable work: Nimbe

Chimezie Imo is a Nigerian actor and model. He is best known for his roles in Nimbe, Kasala, Breath of Life and MTV Shuga Naija series.

== Background ==
Chimezie was born on January 7, 1990, in Lagos State, but hails from Orsu Local Government Area of Imo State in south eastern Nigeria. At the age of 7, he was part of his church's choir and theatre groups.

== Career ==
Chimezie's film and television career began in 2014 when was named runner up on Nigerian talent show, ‘The Next Movie Star Reality Show’. He made his on-screen debut in the film, ‘Learning Curves' and has since starred in TV shows like ‘Origin’ and the comedy ‘90 Gogoro’.

In 2018, Chimezie played a confused young man, bowing to peer pressure in Shuga Naija which put him in the spotlight. Same year, he played one of four boys in the trenches united by bonds of friendship in a critically acclaimed comedy titled Kasala.

In 2019, Chimezie played a drug-addled teenager in Nimbe. He received raving reviews for his role in the film and was nominated for Best Actor Nominee at the Future Awards 2020 and Most Promising Yong Actor at Africa Movie Academy Awards (AMAA) 2020.

In 2022, Chimezie starred in psychodrama "Choke" and received praise for his performance in it as a sickle cell patient who slowly spirals out of control.

In 2023, Chimezie was nominated for Africa Magic Viewers Choice award for Best Actor in a Leading role for Choke. In 2024, Chimezie Imo starred and produced Nollywood/Kazakhstani first joint production Adam Bol.

== Filmography ==
- Kasala (2018) as Abraham
- Nimbe (2019) as Nimbe
- The Wait (2021) as Somto
- Choke (2022)
- One Too Many (2022) as Otas
- Over The Bridge (2023)
- Breath of Life (2023) as Elijah
- Everybody Loves Jenifa (2024)
- Alakada: Bad and Boujee (2024)

== Awards and nominations ==
Year	Award	Category	Result	Ref
2020	Africa Movie Academy Award	Best Promising Young Actor	Nominated	
2020	Future Awards	The Future Awards Africa Prize for Acting	Nominated	
2023	Africa Magic Viewers Choice Award	Best Actor In A Drama	Nominated	
2024	Africa Magic Viewers Choice Award	Trailblazer Award	Won	
