= Doyin Abiola =

Nigerian media personality (1942 or 1943 – 2025)

- Born: Doyinsola Hamidat Abiola; 1942 or 1943
- Died: 5 August 2025 (aged 82)
- Education: University of Ibadan; New York University
- Occupation: Writer

Doyinsola Hamidat Abiola (1942 or 1943 – 5 August 2026) was a Nigerian journalist who was the managing director and publisher of National Concord. She was the first Nigerian woman to be an editor of a Nigerian daily newspaper.

== Education and career ==
Doyin Abiola was educated at the University of Ibadan, Nigeria where she earned a degree in English and Drama in 1969.

After graduation, she started work with the Daily Sketch Newspaper in 1969. During this period, she started writing a column in the newspaper called Tiro which was addressing sundry issues of public concern, including gender matters. In 1970, she left Daily Sketch Newspaper and traveled to the United States to pursue a master's degree programme in Journalism. upon her return, she was employed as a Features Writer at Daily Times and rose to become the Group Features Editor. She later went to New York University and obtained a PhD in communications and political science in 1979. After her PHD programme, she returned to the Daily Times and was deployed to the editorial board where she worked with other experienced editors like Stanley Macebuh, Dele Giwa and Amma Ogan. It was, however, to be a short stay as the newly formed National Concord newspaper invited her to be its pioneer daily editor. She then moved to be an editor of National Concord. She was promoted to be the managing director/editor-in-chief in 1986. She became the first Nigerian woman to become the editor in chief of a daily newspaper in Nigeria. Abiola was also the widow of the first publisher and proprietor of National Concord Newspaper Chief Moshood Abiola whom she married in 1981. Abiola’s career at National Concord Newspaper spanned three decades. She also served in various capacities in the media industry in Nigeria. She was the Chairperson of the Awards Nominating panel at the first Nigerian Media Merit Award to be hosted in Nigeria. She was a member of Advisory Council, Faculty of Social and Management Sciences, Ogun State University.

== Death ==
Abiola died following a long illness on 5 August 2025, at the age of 82.

== Awards and recognition ==
Abiola was a recipient of Diamond Awards for Media Excellence (DAME) for her lifelong devotion to advancing the frontiers of knowledge and strengthening the media as a pillar of democracy. The Trustees of DAME unanimously approved her selection as a recipient of its Lifetime Achievement Award at the 24th DAME Ceremony. She was the second woman to receive a DAME Lifetime Achievement Award after Mrs.(Omobola Onajide). She was granted Eisenhower Fellowship in 1986.

== See also ==
- Moshood Abiola
