= Senior Special Assistant =

Nigerian government advisory position

Senior Special Assistant also known as the abbreviation (SSA) in Nigeria, is a particular role given to a person as the assistant to a particular leader, in the Nigerian government.

== Word usage ==
The word ‘Senior Special Assistant’ (SSA) can also be addressed as a Nigerian english language, commonly use by the Nigerians to address a person especially in the Nigerian government system, appointed to such specific post. In Africa, the abbreviation (SSA) can also be represent as Sub-Saharan Africa.

=== SA ===
Special adviser also known as (SA), is a role given to a person commonly in the Nigerian government with the aim of acquiring information.

== Notable people ==
Name	Origin	Notes	ref
Catherine Obianuju Acholonu	Imo State, Nigeria	Nigerian author, who served as the Senior Special Adviser (SSA) to President Olusegun Obasanjo on Arts and Culture.	
Aliyu Ibrahim Gebi	Bauchi, Nigeria	A security expert, who served as the Senior Special Adviser to the Ministry of Interior since 2015.	
Benjamin Kalu	Abia State, Nigeria	A Nigerian politician, who served as the Senior Special Adviser to Theodore Orji on Local Government and Chieftaincy Affairs in Abia State, Nigeria.	
Onyema Ugochukwu	Abia State, Nigeria	Nigerian journalist, who served as the senior Special Adviser on Communication to Nigerian President Olusegun Obasanjo.	
Banji Oyelaran-Oyeyinka	Nigeria	A Nigerian professor, who serve as the senior special adviser on Industrialization to the President of the African Development Bank (AfDB).	
Wanle Akinboboye	Lagos, Nigeria	A Nigerian culture and tourism icon, who once served as the Senior Special Adviser to Ondo state Governor on tourism.	
Innocent Umezulike	Rivers State, Nigeria	A Nigerian jurist, who served as the senior special adviser to the Attorney General of Nigeria.	
Mercy Johnson	Rivers State, Nigeria	A Nigerian actress, who served as the Senior Special Assistant (SSA) to Yahaya Bello on entertainment, arts and culture.	
Lekan Fatodu	Lagos, Nigeria	A Nigerian Journalist, who served as the SSA on Sustainable Development Goals to the governor Babajide Sanwo-Olu.	
Ajuri Ngelale	United States, Nigeria	Nigerian Journalist and politician, who served as the senior special adviser on public affairs to President Muhammadu Buhari.	
Umar Sani	Kaduna, Nigeria	A Nigerian media person, who served as the Senior Special Adviser on Media and Publicity to Vice President Namadi Sambo.	

== See also ==
- Special Adviser to the President (Nigeria)
