= Femi Odugbemi =

Nigerian writer and filmmaker (born 1963)

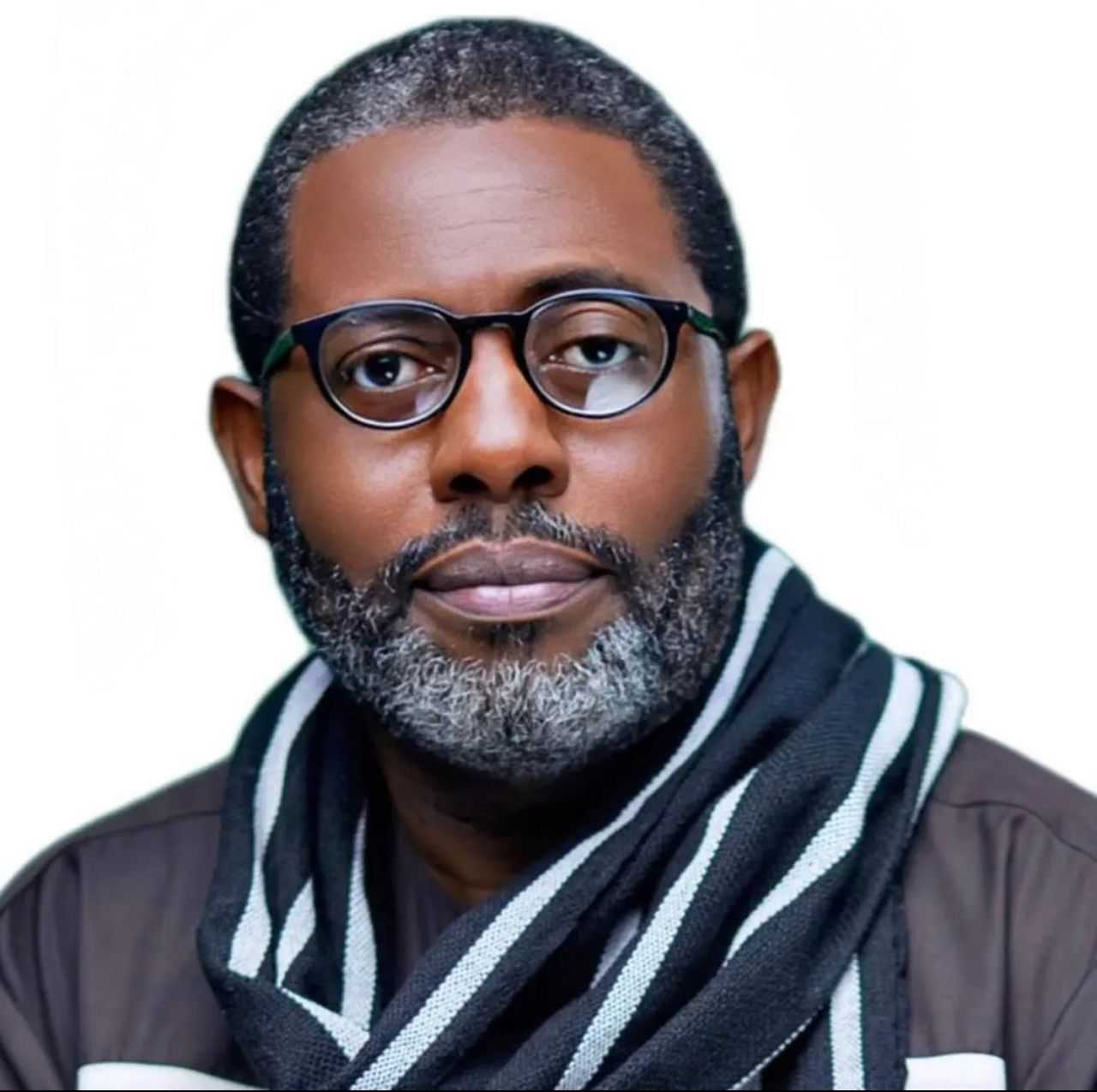
- Born: 24 May 1963 (age 63); Lagos State, Nigeria
- Education: Montana State University
- Occupations: Writer; filmmaker; television producer
- Notable work: Tinsel; Bariga Boys; Battleground; Abobaku
- Relatives: D. O. Fagunwa
- Awards: Fellow of Theatre Arts; Nigerian Film Corporation Lifetime Achievement Award
- Website: Official website

Femi Odugbemi (born 24 May 1963) is a Nigerian writer, filmmaker, television producer and the founder and executive producer of Zuri24 Media, a content production company in Lagos, Nigeria.

== Early life and education ==
Odugbemi was born on 24 May 1963 in Fadeyi, Mushin, Lagos, Nigeria.

Odugbemi attended Government Demonstration School, Onitolo for his primary education and Apostolic Church Grammar School for his secondary education all in Surulere. At 16, Odugbemi set out to study broadcast communication with specialisation in film, radio and television production at Montana State University (MSU) from 1979 to 1984. While in the US, he worked as a producer at KUSM Channel 9 in Bozeman, Montana. Odugbemi was posted to Kaduna for Youth Service program to work at the Nigerian Television Authority (NTA) Kaduna where he worked from 1985 to 1986.

== Career ==
After graduating, Odugbemi returned to Nigeria and worked briefly at the Nigerian Television Authority before proceeding to work as a radio and television producer at Lintas Advertising and deputy creative director at TBB-McCann. He wrote plays, documentaries and commercials in these positions.

Odugbemi was the president of the Independent Television Producers Association of Nigeria (ITPAN), the chair of the Lagos International Forum on Cinema, Motion Pictures and Video in Africa from 2002 to 2006. He was also appointed to the Steering Committee of the Motion Picture Council of Nigeria (MOPICON) by the Minister of Information and Communication in the same year. He is a member of the adversary board of the School of Media and Communications, Pan African University, a member of the board of Lufodo Academy of Performing Arts (LAPA) and the international advisor and consultant of the Orange Academy, Lagos.

Odugbemi was the head judge for the Africa Magic Viewers' Choice Awards for five years: 2012 to 2014, 2019 and 2023, head judge of the Uganda Film Festival Awards for three years: 2014 to 2016 and a juror in the Johannesburg International Film Festival and a juror and mentor of the Netflix/UNESCO African Folktales Reimagined project.

Odugbemi is an Academy of Motion Picture Arts and Sciences (Oscar Awards) and International Academy of Television Arts and Sciences (Emmy Awards) voting member.

In March 2010, Odugemi co-founded the iRepresent International Documentary Film Festival with Jahman Anikulapo and Makin Soyinka. He is also the founder of Dvwork Studios and the executive producer and chief executive officer of Zuri24 Media. Odugbemi served as the pioneer director of the Multichoice Talent Factory for West Africa from 2018 to 2022. He received the Film Excellence Award from the Society of the Performing Arts of Nigeria in November 2013, and the Lifetime Achievement Award from the Nigerian Film Corporation in 2018.

In August 2008, Odugbemi co-created and produced Tinsel with Jaiye Ojo and Lemmy Adebule. The series received critical and commercial recognition during its run. His other television productions include Battleground (2017), Brethren (2019), Movement-Japa (2021), and Covenant (2022).

Odugbemi has produced films including Marako (2006), Abobaku (2008 a 16mm celluloid film directed by Niji Akanni, which served as Nigeria's entry into the MNet's New Directions project in 2008), Gidi Blues (2016), 4th Estate (2017), Code Wilo (2018) and The Eve (2018); documentaries such as: Life in Lagos (2003), Bar Beach Blues (2004), Oui Voodoo (2005), Metamorphosis (2006), Ibadan-Cradle of Literati (2008), Bariga Boys (2009), Oriki (2010), Change Today (2010), Keeping Hope Alive (2010), And the Chain was Not: The Story of Freedom Park Lagos (2010), The Orange Chronicle (2010), Nigeria Good People, Great Nation (2011), A Beautiful Life: Tribute to Tavo Aderinokun (2011), FAGUNWA: Literature, Language and Literalism (2013), MAKOKO: Futures Afloat (2016), and Unmasked: Leadership, Trust and the COVID-19 (2021).

== Filmography ==
=== TV dramas ===
- Tinsel (2008)
- Battleground (2018)
- Brethren (2019)
- Movement Japa (2020)
- Covenant (2022)

=== Feature films ===
- Maroko (2006)
- Gidi Blues (2016)
- 4th Estate (2017)
- Code Wilo (2018)
- The Eve (2018)

=== Documentaries ===
- Life in Lagos (2003)
- Bar Beach Blues (2004)
- Oui Voodoo (2005)
- Metamorphosis (2006)
- Ibadan: Cradle of Literati (2006)
- Bariga Boys (2009)
- Oriki (2010)
- Change Today (2010)
- Keeping Hope Alive (2010),
- And The Chain Was Not (2010)
- The Orange Chronicle (2010)
- Nigeria Good People, Great Nation (2011)
- A Beautiful Life: Tribute to Tavo Aderinokun (2011)
- Fagunwa: Literature, Language, and Literalism
- Makoko: Futures Afloat (2016)
- Unmasked: Leadership, Trust, and the COVID-19 Pandemic in Nigeria (2021)

== Personal life ==
Odugbemi is from the family of D. O. Fagunwa.
