= Gulder Ultimate Search =

Nigerian reality television series

- Genre: Reality
- Presented by: Chidi Mokeme, Bob-Manuel Udokwu, Toke Makinwa
- Country of origin: Nigeria
- Original language: English
- No. of series: 12

Production
- Executive producer: Oluseyi Siwoku. Nigerian Breweries Plc
- Producer: Olakunle Oyeneye
- Running time: 56 minutes
- Production company: Jungle Fireworks

Original release
- Network: Nigeria TV3
- Release: 2004 – 2021

Gulder Ultimate Search (also called GUS) is a Nigerian reality television series, created and sponsored by Nigerian Breweries Plc to promote the Gulder Lager Beer. The first season premiered in 2004. The GUS series is also the very first 100% local content reality television programme in Nigeria and it is a survival type reality programme that highlights the struggle of contestants (10–30 persons, depending on the reference edition), their struggles against themselves and the wild i.e. nature and their search for a hidden treasure that brings to the last person standing instant fame and fortune. The winner of the last season in 2021 took home 50 million naira worth of prizes.

After 7 years off TV, Gulder Ultimate Search returned to the television screen in year 2021.

== Past seasons, locations, storylines and winners ==
The series is produced by a Nigerian-based producer, Olakunle Oyeneye and Executive Producer Oluseyi Siwoku of Jungle Filmworks.

=== GUS 1 ===
GUS 1 was produced on Snake Island in Lagos State. The theme was 'The Legend of Captain Kush' and Mr. Ezeugo Egwuagwu made history as the first winner of the reality show took home the prize of 3 Million Naira.

=== GUS 2 ===
Obudu Hills, Calabar, Cross River played host to the second season 'The Lost Helmet of General Maximilian' and Mr. Lucan Chambliss won the Star Prize of 5 Million Naira.

=== GUS 3 ===
NIFOR, Benin, Edo State, was the venue of 'The Brew Master's Secret' (Season 3) and Mr. Hector Joberteh won the grand prize of 5 Million Naira and a Ford Explorer SUV. The now deceased Hector was shot dead at his apartment in Lagos on the morning of 3 September 2017.

=== GUS 4 ===
Shere Hills of Jos was the venue of 'The Search for the Golden Age' and the athletic Dominic Mudabai claimed the title that year.

==== Death of contestant ====
A contestant Anthony Ogadje, drowned in a lake in Jos Plateau State in GUS 4 during the shoot.

=== GUS 5 ===
In the hills of Mmaku in Awgu, Enugu, Mr Michael Nwachukwu found 'The Lost Chronicle' and exchanged it for the 5 million naira and a brand new SUV.

=== GUS 6 ===
GUS 6 was taken to the western part of Nigeria in the Omodo Forest of Aagba in Osun State and 'The Horn of Valour' was found by Mr. Uche Nwaezeapu.

=== Celebrity showdown ===
The celebrity edition of the GUS series was launched in 2010 and location was La Campaigne Tropicana, Epe, Lagos. 'The Golden Goblet' was found by the Ace Nollywood Actor Emeka Ike and he went home with the sum of seven million naira.

=== GUS 7 ===
In the same year when the Celebrity Edition was done, the GUS series moved to Omo Forest, J4 Ogun State for season 7 and 'The Ultimate Hero' was Mr. Oyekunle Oluwaremi.

=== GUS 8 ===
The Kukuruku Hills, Egbetua Quarters in Ososo, Akoko-Edo Edo State was where 'The Contest of Champions' took place and Mr. Chris Okagbue won the 8th season.

=== GUS 9 ===
2012 was the year that the search moved to Usaka, Obot Akara, Akwa Ibom where 'The Gatekeeper's Fortune' was found by Paschal Eronmose Ojezele. GUS 9 was directed by Laszlo Bene, an American Director/Producer.

=== GUS 10 ===
In the forest of Usaka, Akwa Ibom, Mr. Dennis Okike found 'The Tenth Symbol' and exchanged it for the 10 million naira and a brand new Mitsubishi Pajero. GUS 10 was directed by Laszlo Bene, an American Director/Producer.

=== GUS 11 ===
GUS 11 was in Aguleri forest in Anambra state, where 'The General's Helmet' was found by Chinedu Ubachukwu. He was rewarded with 10 million naira and a brand new Ford Explorer car.

== New season ==
=== GUS 12: The Age of Craftmanship ===
Gulder Ultimate Search returned to the television screen after seven years, with the last season airing in 2014. The new season ran from 16 October 2021 to 19 December 2021, on Saturdays and Sundays from 8pm to 9pm. Eighteen contestants were unveiled for Gulder Ultimate Search season 12 which included Damola Johnson, a 26-year-old film director from Lagos, Mfon Mikel Esin, a 27-year-old freelance writer from Akwa Ibom, Samuel Ishmael, 35-year old IT expert from Ogun, Emmanuel Nnebe, 29-year old paralegal from Anambra, Damilola Odedina, 25-year old cinematographer, Solomon Yankari, 26-year old fitness instructor from Bauchi, Olayinka Omoya, Godswill Oboh, Omokhafe Bello, Chidimma Okeibe, Jennifer Okorie, Tobechukwu Okoye, Gerald Odeka, Tosin Michael Emiola, and Iniabasi Umoren.

Celebrity OAP, Toke Makinwa was selected as the anchor for the 12th season, while season 7 winner, Kunle Remi was chosen as the taskmaster.

Odudu Otu was crowned the winner of this season’s Gulder Ultimate Search, after finding Akolo’s chest on the final day following a tough battle with the 17 other contestants who made it into the jungle with him. He was presented with N50 million worth of prizes, including the key to an SUV courtesy of Innoson Motors and a return ticket to Dubai.
