= Hauwa Allahbura =

Nigerian entrepreneur and media producer

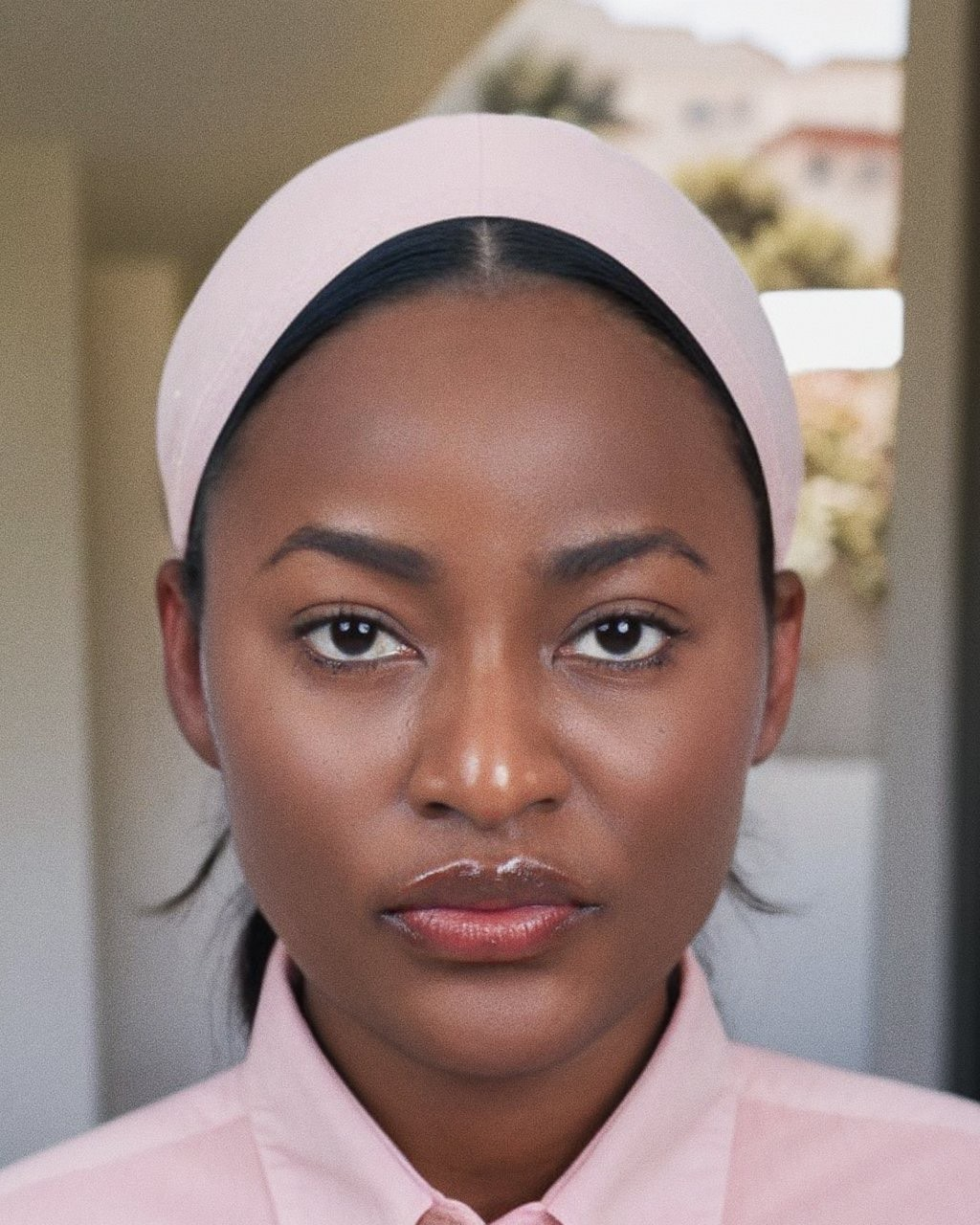
- Born: Lagos State, Nigeria
- Education: Nasarawa State University · London Film Academy · New York Film Academy · Montana State University · Harvard University (diploma)
- Occupations: Entrepreneur; Business executive; Media producer
- Known for: Oil and gas business ventures, vessel leasing and maritime services, media production, youth civic engagement initiatives, Nigeria Stability Index (NSI)

Hauwa Allahbura is a Nigerian entrepreneur, business executive, media producer, and civic engagement advocate known for her work across the energy, maritime, strategic communications, and media sectors. She is the founder of Lahbura24 Limited, an energy and strategic projects company involved in vessel leasing and oil and gas services. She is also a co-founder and majority shareholder of Cut24 Productions, a Nigerian media and film production company.

Allahbura previously served as Director of Corporate Communications at Vinicius Group, where she oversaw digital strategy and corporate communications initiatives. She is also known for founding Pull-up Naija, a civic engagement campaign aimed at encouraging youth participation in Nigeria's electoral process.

== Early life and education ==
Hauwa Allahbura was born in Lagos State, Nigeria, into a family of customs officers.

Due to the nature of her father's profession, she attended primary schools in different parts of Nigeria, including Crescent International School, Lagos; Crescent International School, Kano; and the French International School, Badagry. She attended Police Secondary School, Minna, Niger State, and later Federal Government College, Ilorin, Kwara State.

She obtained a degree in History and International Studies from Nasarawa State University, Keffi. She also studied at the London Film Academy, New York Film Academy, and Montana State University, and earned a diploma in Negotiation Mastery from Harvard University.

== Career ==
=== Media and entertainment ===
Allahbura began her career in the Nigerian entertainment industry as a television presenter and actress. She was selected to join the M-Net television series Tinsel, where she played the role of Maro.

She later appeared in and produced several Nigerian films and television projects, including Gidi Blues (2016), The Eve (2018), Code Wilo (2019), Las Gidi Vice, Battle Ground, and Okiripoto (2020).

She co-founded Cut24 Productions alongside filmmaker Femi Odugbemi and later became the company's chief executive officer. She currently holds majority shares in the company.

=== Corporate communications and business ventures ===
Allahbura later transitioned into corporate communications, strategic development, and business management roles within the private sector. She served as Director of Corporate Communications at Vinicius Group, where she led corporate communications and digital strategy initiatives.

She subsequently founded Lahbura24 Limited, a Nigerian company involved in strategic projects, energy services, digital services, and government-related contracting.

=== Energy and maritime sector ===
Allahbura is involved in the Nigerian oil and gas sector through Lahbura Energy, a division focused on maritime logistics, vessel leasing, and energy-related services. Her work in the sector includes interests in offshore support services, marine logistics, and vessel operations connected to the energy industry.

== Public initiatives and advocacy ==
=== 24 Angels Initiative ===
Allahbura is the founder of the 24 Angels Initiative, a non-profit organization focused on entrepreneurship support, youth engagement, and community development initiatives in Nigeria. Through the initiative, she has supported small businesses and grassroots entrepreneurs.

=== Pull-up Naija ===
Under the 24 Angels Initiative, she launched Pull-up Naija, a civic engagement campaign designed to encourage youth participation in Nigeria's electoral process and promote voter awareness among young Nigerians.

=== Nigeria Stability Index ===
The 24 Angels Initiative also oversees the Nigeria Stability Index (NSI), a civic data and public sentiment platform focused on governance, security, economy, investor confidence, and social stability indicators in Nigeria.

== Family background ==
Allahbura is the daughter of the late Ilyasu Yakubu Allahbura, a retired Deputy Comptroller of Customs.

== Filmography ==
Year	Title	Role
2014	Rovieno	
2015	Wind Chaser	
2016	Gidi Blues	Nkem Nochiri
2017	3 is a Crowd	Oma
2018	The Eve	Uwa
2018	Las Gidi Vice	Jemila
2019	Code Wilo	
2020	Okiripoto	

== Organizations ==
- Lahbura24 Limited
- Lahbura Energy
- Cut24 Productions
- 24 Angels Initiative
