= IESCO =

IESCO may refer to:

- International Ecological Safety Collaborative Organization
- Islamabad Electric Supply Company
