= Akin Lewis =

Nigerian actor (born 1957)

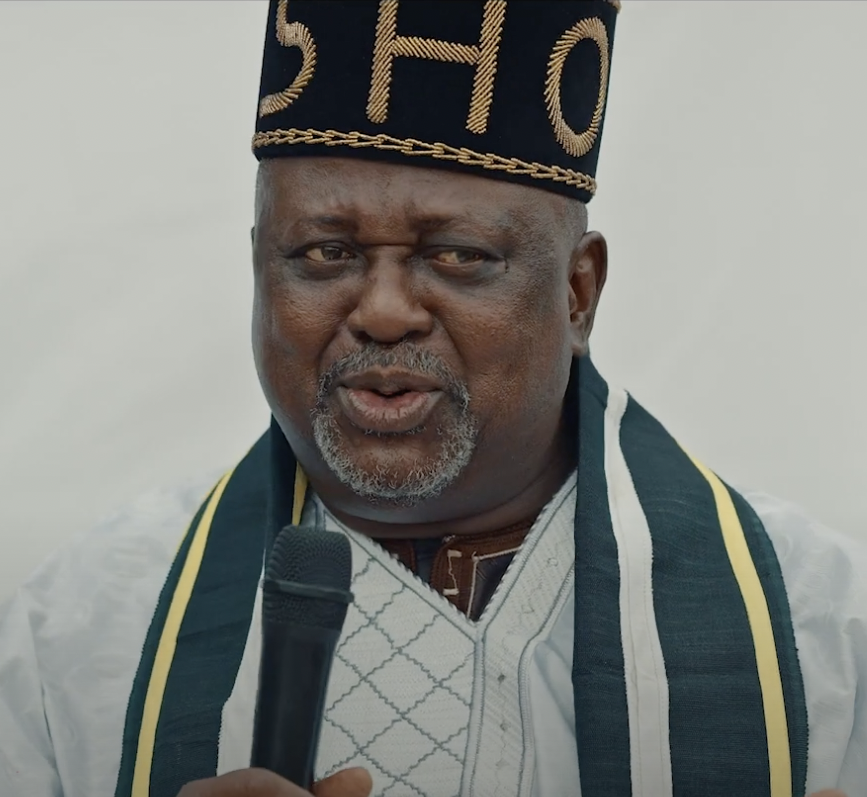
- Born: 1957 (age 68–69); Ibadan, Oyo State, Nigeria
- Education: University of Ife; Sofia University
- Occupations: Actor; producer; director
- Years active: 1973 till;present
- Notable work: Silver Lining (2012); Heroes and Zeroes (2010); TinselHotel Majestic, Jemeji, Borokini, Madam Dearest, Mind Bending, Why Worry, Koko Klose, Alantakun, Were Alaso, King of Boys, No Budget, Up North, Fortunes

Akin Lewis (born 1957) is a Nigerian film actor, director, and producer.

== Early life and career ==
Lewis was born in 1957 in Ibadan, Oyo State, Nigeria, and grew up in Zaria, Kaduna State. He began his acting career in 1973, the same year he joined a drama group led by Professor Bode Sowande, a Nigerian writer and dramatist.

Lewis came into the limelight when he played the lead role in Why Worry, a 1980 comedy sitcom on NTA Ibadan, but gained more popularity for his role as local playboy Emeka in the sitcom Koko Close. He won best actor in 1982 based on the series and entered the national limelight in Madam Dearest, a 2005 Nigerian film produced and directed by Tade Ogidan. Over the years, he has featured, produced and directed several films.

He featured in Tinsel, a Nigerian soap opera that began airing in August 2008 and Heroes and Zeroes, a 2010 Nigerian film written and directed by Niji Akanni. He celebrated his 40th year on stage in December 2013.

== Personal life ==
Lewis met his wife in the year 1987. He was happily married and become a father.

In a December 2025 interview on the African A-List Podcast, Lewis spoke about the collapse of his first marriage, describing it as one of the most painful experiences of his life and saying he still did not understand why his wife left, stating "I still don't understand why the woman left till today." He said the experience reshaped his outlook on relationships and human behaviour, but that he chose not to dwell on it, describing it as ultimately making him stronger and more focused.

== Selected filmography ==
- Freedom Way (2024) as Mr. Adewale
- Shina (2024) as BB
- Over the Bridge (2023) as Chief Agoro
- A Weekend to Forget (2023) as Chief
- King of Boys: The Return of the King (2021) as Aare Akinwande
- The New Patriots (2020) as Dr. Nathaniel Olubo
- Soft Work (2020) as Chief Ademuyiwa
- Heroes and Zeroes (2012) as Ayoade Alba
- Silver Lining (2012)
- Tinsel (2008)
- May 29 (film) (2020) as Otunba Demeji

== Award ==
In October 2010, he won the Audio Visual Awards (TAVA) for best actor. He won best actor in 1982 based on the series and national limelight in Madam Dearest

== See also ==
- List of Nigerian film producers
