= Akanni =

Àkàn ó
- Gender: Male
- Language: Yoruba

Origin
- Origin: Nigerian
- Meaning: "One that is special to have"
- Region of origin: South-west Nigeria

AkanniAkanni is a Nigerian masculine given name and oriki of Yoruba origin meaning "One that is special to have." The name is morphologically structured as à-kàn-ní, with “à” (one who), “kàn” (specially), and “ní” (have).

== Notable people with the name ==
- Niji Akanni, Nigerian dramatist, screenwriter, director, producer and filmmaker
- Waidi Akanni (born 1968), Nigerian football defender, former head of the Lagos State Football Association
- Akanni Hislop (born 1998), Trinidad and Tobago athlete
- Abdul-Lateef Adeniran Akanni Ojikutujoye I (1958–2022), Nigerian monarch
- Kazeem Akanni Jimoh, Nigerian agricultural economist and a research scientist
- Akanni-Sunday Wasiu (born 1984), Nigerian former professional footballer
