= Gidi Blues =

2016 Nigerian Romantic film

- Produced by: Femi Odugbemi; Mayowa Oluyeba; Hauwa Allahbura
- Starring: Gideon Okeke; Hauwa Allahbura; Lepacious Bose; Daniel Lloyd; Nancy Isime; Bukky Wright; Tina Mba
- Release date: 2016
- Country: Nigeria
- Language: English language

Gidi Blues popularly known as Lagos Love Story is a 2016 Nigerian romantic film produced and directed by Nigerian film makers Femi Odugbemi and Hauwa Allahbura.

The movie stars Gideon Okeke, Hauwa Allahbura, Lepacious Bose, Daniel Lloyd, Nancy Isime, Bukky Wright, Tina Mba, Segun Obadare-Akpata, Toyin Oshinaike, William Ekpo, Banky W, Aduke Anikulapo and Jahman Anikulapo.

== Premiere ==
The movie premiered in June 2016 in collaboration with African Magic at The Federal Palace Hotel & Casino, Victoria Island, Lagos. Apart from the crew, other personalities who attended were Olu Jacobs and wife Joke Silva, Patrick Doyle, Meg Otanwa, Yeni Kuti, Tunde Kelani, Olisa Adibua, Toyin Akinosho, Jahman Anikulapo, Awam Amkpa.

== Synopsis ==
The romantic movie revolves around a playboy— Akin —from a rich family and a beautiful dedicated young lady. They met in an unpredictable place and their encounter created a windstorm experience that unravels the world of Akin.

== Cast ==
- Hauwa Allahbura as Nkem Nochiri
- Jahman Anikulapo as Concert MC
- Lepacious Bose as Simbi
- Ibeh Breakthrough as Jerry
- Ibrahim Drago as Sodiq
- William Ekpo as Bishop Onilude
- Nancy Isime as Carmen Onilude
- Folashade Kareem as Sodiq's Mother
- Daniel Lloyd as Jaiye Thomas
- Tina Mba as Mrs. Onilude
- Segun Obadare-Akpata as Big Bald Guy
- Steve Ogundele as Doctor
- Gideon Okeke as Akinola Kuti
- Shade Omoniyi as Liquor Seller and Lepa Shandy
- Toyin Oshinaike as Boatman
- Babatunde Sanni as Sodiq's Father
- Bukky Wright as Mrs. Kuti

== Awards and nominations ==
In 2017, the film was nominated for Nollywood Paris Award.
