= International Ecological Safety Collaborative Organization =

- International Ecological Safety Collaborative Organization
- Abbreviation: IESCO
- Formation: June 2006
- Type: Organization
- Legal status: Active
- Headquarters: (United States) New York (IGO) Hong Kong (NGO)
- Region served: Worldwide
- Members: 103 Counties
- Executive Chairperson: (Cambodia) Sok An
- Main organ: World Ecological Safety Assembly
- Website: www.iesco-iesco.org

The International Ecological Safety Collaborative Organization (abbreviated IESCO) was established in 2006 in China and founded as an international organization. It had cooperation with some related UN agencies and was in compliance with UN Millennium Development Goals (MDGs).

== Structure ==
The World Ecological Safety Assembly (Presidium) - the highest authority of IESCO

The Executive Committee - the executive body of the Assembly

Executive Chairperson - (Cambodia) Sok An

Director-General - (Hong Kong) Jiang Mingjun

== Regional offices ==
The Secretariat of IESCO, New York (IGO)

The Secretariat of IESCO, Hong Kong (NGO)

== Conferences ==
World Ecological Safety Assembly (every two years)

World Ecological Safety Expo (every two years)

Euro-Asia Ecological Safety Conference (annually)

== History ==
In 2006, IESCO was established.

In 2010, IESCO - Observer’s status at the International Conference of Asian Political Parties (ICAPP).

In 2011, IESCO - Special consultative status at UN Economic and Social Council (UN-ECOSOC) and observer's status at the plenary meeting of UN-ECOSOC and observer's status at UN Alliance of Civilizations.

In 2012, IESCO - Advisory institution of ICAPP and the Permanent Conference of Political Parties of Latin America and the Caribbean (COPPPAL).

In 2013, IESCO and UN-Habitat started to cooperate to implement "UN Youth Empowerment and Urban Ecological Safety" programmes.

== UN Committee of Youth Empowerment and Ecological Safety Program ==
"UN Committee of Youth Empowerment and Ecological Safety" is a Program of UN-Habitat and IESCO which was co-launched in April, 2013 and established in August, 2013.—UN Youth Empowerment and Urban Ecology Committee --

- Honorary Chairman - (Spain) Joan Clos (UN Under-Secretary-General and Executive Director of UN-Habitat)
- Director - (Nigeria) Banji Oyelaran-Oyeyinka (Director of the Global Monitoring and Research Division at UN-Habitat)
- Executive Director - (Hong Kong) Jiang Mingjun (Director-General of IESCO)
- Deputy Directors - (Hong Kong) Shan Fengping (Deputy Directors-General of IESCO)
- Vice presidents - (Ethiopia) Gulelat Kebede (Director of Urban Economy and Finance at UN-Habitat)
- Vice presidents - (China) An Xueli (Deputy Director General of IESCO)
- Vice presidents - (Zambia) Mutinta Adeline Munyati (Attaché of the Global Monitoring and Research Division at UN-Habitat)
- Senior Advisor - (Norway) Anantha Krishnan (Attaché of the Global Monitoring and Research Division at UN-Habitat)
- Secretary General - (Uganda) Victoria Agnes Chebet (Attaché of the Global Monitoring and Research Division at UN-Habitat)

== Publications ==
- International Ecological and Safety
- UN Initiative and Technology for the Youth (with UN–Habitat)

== See also ==
- World Ecological Safety Assembly
