= The Eve (2018 film) =

2018 Nigerian Romantic comedy movie

- Directed by: Tosin Igho,
- Written by: Tunde Babalola; Tosin Igho
- Produced by: Hauwa Allahbura; Femi Odugbemi
- Starring: Beverly Naya; Meg Otanwa; Ronke Oshodi Oke; Efa Iwara; Kunle Remi; John Okafor
- Cinematography: Tosin Igho
- Edited by: Tosin Igho, Bryan Dike
- Music by: Theophilus Magege
- Release date: 2018
- Country: Nigeria
- Language: English

The Eve is a 2018 Nigerian romantic comedy film written by Tunde Babalola, Tosin Igho and Martin Adieze. It was produced by Hauwa Allahbura and Femi Odugbemi, under the production company Cut24 Productions and directed by Tosin Igho, a music video director who has worked with D'banj, Terry G, Faze, Yung L, Aramide and Sammie Okposo. The film stars Beverly Naya, Meg Otanwa, Ronke Oshodi, Hauwa Allahbura, Efa Iwara, Adeolu Adefarasin, Kunle Remi, Mawuli Peter Gavor and John Okafor (Mr Ibu).

== Synopsis ==
A young man, Funsho, who is on the verge of marrying his long time crush, Yewande, becomes attracted to another lady who shows up during his bachelor's party. There is suspense arising from Funsho's inability to deny his growing affection for the new lady.

== Cast ==
- Adeolu Adefarasin as Funsho
- Hauwa Allahbura as Uwa
- Jagila Donatus as event planner
- Femi Durojaiye as Father Paul
- Michael Unome Ejoor as Kayode
- Sixtus Ezeh as event planner
- Efa Iwara as Ebere
- Beverly Naya as Yewande
- Uche Nwaefuna as Bolanle
- Uche Nwaezeapu as Rolex
- Ronke Odusanya as Aunty Keh
- John Okafor as Uncle Festus
- Ronke Oshodi Oke as Aunty Beatrice
- Meg Otanwa as Alero
- Kunle Remi as Audu
- Francis Sule as Spencer
- Toni Tones as Ngozi Emeka
- Nwogu Victory Emeka as event planner

== Themes ==
The film is a romantic comedy that comically explores serious themes, addressing issues such as weddings, marriage, sex, friendship, dating, cheating, celibacy, partying, and homosexuality.

== Premiere ==
The film premiered in Lagos, Nigeria, on 24 March 2018 at the Day Dream Pool Club, Landmark Towers, Victoria Island. It was also shown nationwide on Easter Day, 29 March 2018.
