= Wanle Akinboboye =

Nigerian culture and tourism icon (born 1958)

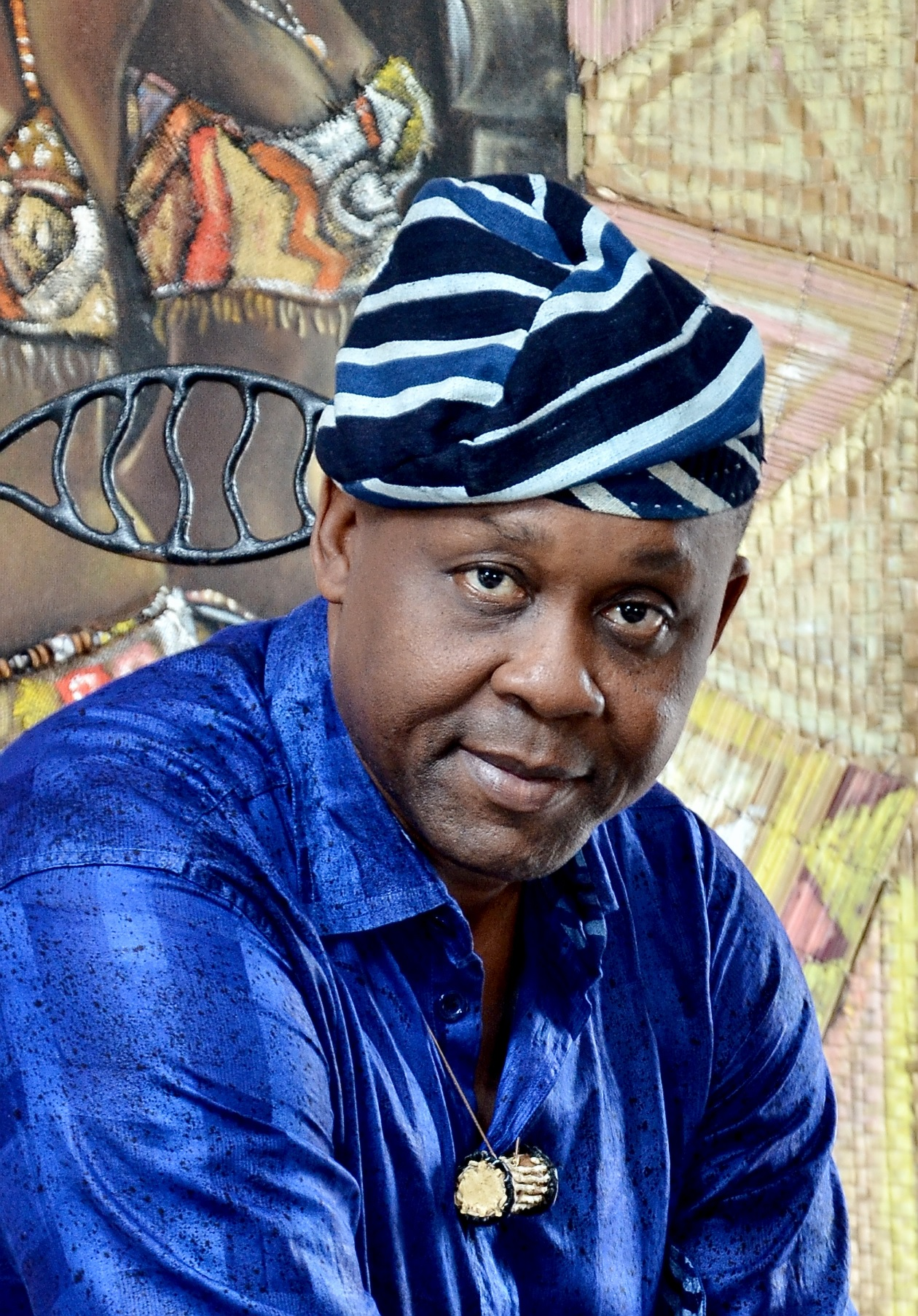
- Akinboboye in 2015
- Born: Wanle Akinboboye; Lagos, Nigeria
- Citizenship: Nigeria
- Education: St. Joseph College, Kaduna State Polytechnic Nigeria, Bowie State University and Florida International University USA.
- Occupations: Founder, Continent Building Initiative, Founder, La Campagne Tropicana Beach Resort.
- Known for: Founding and Leading the Continent Building Initiative
- Website: https://wanleakinboboye.org

Wanle Akinboboye (born 16 August 1958) is a Nigerian culture and tourism icon, who owns the world's first African themed beach, forest and river resort- La Campagne Tropicana Beach Resort. In recent times, he has commissioned additional resorts in other destinations, such as in Grand-Bassam, Côte d'Ivoire, Wolyta Soddo in Ethiopia and Koton-Karfe, Kogi State, Nigeria. He created and produces the popular Mare Festival for Ondo State government.

He is currently an Advisor to the African Union Economic Cultural and Social Council in Nigeria (AUECOSSOC) Dr. Akinboboye has consulted for several state governments in Nigeria to develop their culture and tourism sectors. He was the chief tourism adviser and consultant to the Ooni of Ile-Ife. He is also the Tourism Ambassador for the Conference of World Mayors.

== Early life and career ==
Wanle Akinboboye began his educational pursuit from St. Josephs College Ondo and a diploma certificate in Mechanical Engineering from the Kaduna Polytechnic, Nigeria respectively. Afterwards, he jetted out of the country to the United States of America where he studied Business Administration & Security Operations as his first degree before capping it with a master's degree in Hospitality Management from Florida International University, Miami, USA in 1983.

In 1984 Wanle Akinboboye returned from the United States of America to pursue three things he had developed capacity in: Security, Tourism and Entertainment. Some of the companies he floated to launch his feet into these sectors include Corporate Guards LTD, Motherland Beckons, Atunda Entertainment, and La Campagne Tropicana Beach Resort. La Campagne Tropicana Beach Resort is an African-themed resort that sits on a 65-acre land-space at the Ibeju-Lekki area of Lagos, featuring a unique blend of natural environments which include a fresh water lake, accessible mangrove forest, a savannah, extensive sandy beach, and the warm Atlantic Ocean.

== More activities ==
Wanle Akinboboye is a lover of Africa who believes firmly that African culture, art, music and cuisine can bring prosperity to the continent if harnessed. He refers to his efforts as continent building, which explains why he engages his experience in tourism, hospitality management, security and entertainment to create employment opportunities for people in Africa.

He founded the continent building initiative a movement made up of Africans in the continent and in diaspora who are committed to the development of Africa through tourism, hospitality, entertainment, security and investments. In providing a platform for Africans in Diaspora to contribute to the development of the continent, he founded Motherland beckons whose aim is to connect Africa (and Africans) with the over 1.2 billion people of African descent in the Diasporas through tourism and investments. He created business bridge which encourages Africans in the Diaspora to invest in the continent, thus helping to boost the economy of Africa.

Over the period of 32 years, Dr. Akinboboye has founded sixteen companies and organizations in security, entertainment and tourism which are implementation towards his continent building agenda. Some of these organisations and initiatives include; Corporate Guards Ltd La Campagne Tropicana Beach Resort, Atunda Entertainment, Africa International Music Festival, Motherland Beckons, Motherland destinations Africa Turkey trade Center, Mare Festival, Kamp Afrika, Youth African Tourism Expedition, Corporate Africa Eco Retreat, Hope, Unity, Rebirth and Prosperity, Tropicana Spas and Pools.

== Appointments ==
Otunba Wanle Akinboboye has been appointed in various capacities by the United Nations, African Union, World conference of Mayors, Governments and private organizations.

He has also received awards and commendations across a broad spectrum of organizations globally.

His appointments include:

1. Advisor to African Union Economic Social and cultural council, February 2020

2. Advisor on the board of Arab African Economic Development Initiative January 2018.

3. Executive Chief consultant/Adviser on Tourism to the Ooni of Ife. December 2015

4. Chairman, African Union Culture, Education and Entertainment Committee. March 2015

5. Appointed as the Senior Special Adviser to Ondo state Governor on tourism. April 2014.

6. Appointed Antigua & Barbudas Consular Attaché for Tourism & Business Development in Nigeria 1 April 2011

7. Appointed twice as Tourism Ambassador for the continent of Africa by the World Conference of Mayors, Inc. 14 May 2011

8. Co-Chair of the Distinguished Corporate Roundtable of the World Conference of Mayors, Inc.- 2011

9. Co-Producer At The International Women's Day at UNESCOs Headquarters, Paris 8 March 2006

10. Co-Producer At The Melody For Dialogue Among Civilizations Association Conference, Abuja: 10th 23 June 2006

11. Co-Producer At The 60th Anniversary Celebration Of UNESCO, Paris 16 November 2005

12. Artistic Director For Leon H. Sullivan Summit (organized by Andrew Young and Sullivan Foundation), Abuja: 14 19 July 2003

== Awards and recognitions ==
1. Doctor of Arts (Honoris Causa), European American University, USA.

2. Most creative and resilient Tourism personality of the year 2019: Institute of tourism professionals

3. Honorary recognition award for Excellence in Tourism and Hospitality 2019. Africa's Young Entrepreneur

4. Nigeria's icon of culture and Tradition 2018 – Black heritage international

5. Tourism Icon of the year 2017, Travelogue Communications

6. Ondo state Tourism icon of the year 2017 – Yoruba Heritage international Ltd

7. Certificate of congressional recognition – April 2016 United States Congress signed by Sheila Jackson Lee

8. Recipient of lifetime Achievement award – 2016. Flamingo Awards by Houston African Community International

9. Tourism Man Of The Year 2015. Africa travels award

10. Award of Exemplary Leadership — 2014 Yoruba Youth Council

11. Special Recognition award for outstanding contribution to tourism development 2011-Ariya Culture and tourism Expo

12. Official Citation Of Dr. Akinboboye's Diverse Accomplishments As A Business Man: Maryland General Assembly, USA (Signed by Senator Hlysses Currie) 21 March 2008.

13. Individual Merit Award presented by Travelers Magazine 20 February 2003

14. Patriotic Man Of Integrity Award 2002 awarded by the Royal Achievers International Media Network

15. Tourism Hall Of Fame Award for contribution towards the development of Tourism, Hospitality and Culture in Nigeria.

16. Keys To The City Of Glenarden, Maryland, USA by the Mayor of Gleneden 16 April 2001

17. Keys To The City Of District Heights, Maryland, USA by the Mayor of District Heights and president of World Conference of Mayors inc. 16 April 2001

18. Keys To The City Of Miami, USA by the Mayor of Miami- 16 April 2001

19. Keys To The Seat Pleasant, Maryland, USA- 16 April 2001

== Plays written by Wanle Akinboboye ==
Dr Akinboboye has written, produced and directed several plays including:

1. Odigbose – The first African account of the trans-Atlantic slave trade.
2. Ajo (African People) – A dance drama that traces the history of the African people from the days of slavery to GSM days.
