= Uche Nwaezeapu =

Nigerian actor and winner of Gulder Ultimate Search

Uche Ben Nwaezeapu
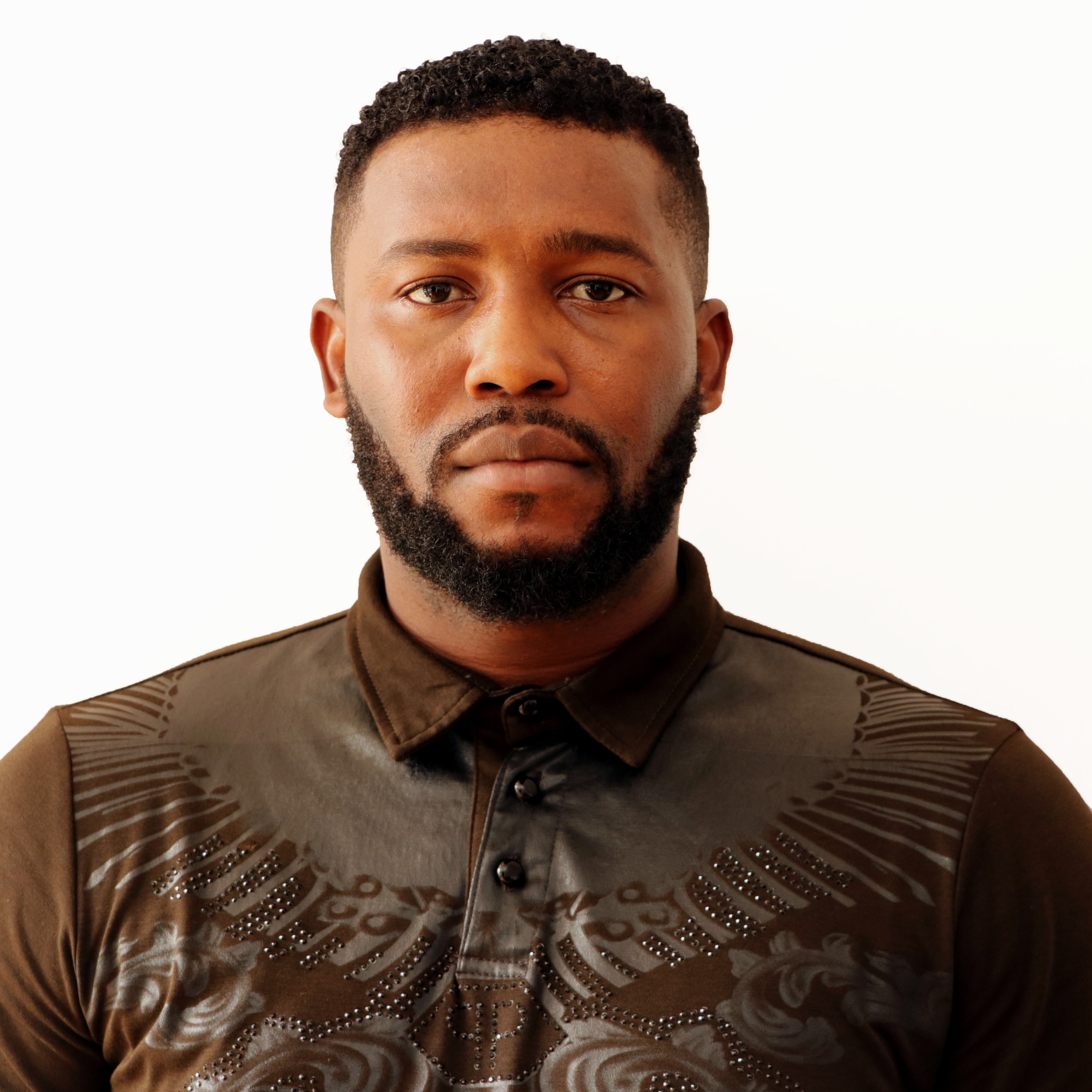
- Born: Lagos State
- Other name: Uche Ben
- Occupations: Actor; TV host movie producer
- Known for: Winner of GUS 6
- Awards: Blue Screen Awards

Uche Ben Nwaezeapu, known professionally as Uche Ben, is a Nigerian actor, movie Producer, TV host, and winner of the 2009 Gulder Ultimate Search.

== Early life and education ==
Born in 1983 in Lagos State, Nigeria, Nwaezeapu graduated with a bachelor's degree in Economics from Delta State University.

== Career ==
Nwaezeapu won the 2009 Gulder Ultimate search which took place in Omodo Forest of Aagba where he found the Horn of Valour. After his 2009 win, he has featured in films such as The Forbidden Fruit, Clandestine, Sister’s Love.

In 2022, he won the Best Actor in a Leading Role, and Outstanding Nollywood Star Award at the 2022 Blue Screen Awards for his role in Fate’s Scribble.

== Filmography ==
=== films ===
Year	Title	Role	Notes	Ref
2015	Tinsel	Business man	Produced by Africa Magic	
2017	Battle ground	Nwosu	Produced by Zuri 24 Media for Africa magic	
2018	Eve	Rolex	Directed by Tosin Igho	
2018	Lost Treasure	Uche	Directed by Film Boy the first	
2019	Complicated	Ugo	Produced by Uche Ben	
2019	Battle ground finale showdown	Nwosu	Produced by Zuri 24 Media for Africa Magic	
2020	Half Shot of Sunrise	Azeez	Produced & Directed by Tissy Nnachi for Rok TV	
2020	Turning 30	Tega Directed by Tissy Nnachi	Produced & Directed by Tissy Nnachi for Rok TV	
2020	Love cycle	Lambert	Produced & Directed by Tissy Nnachi for Rok TV	
2020	Mac and Muna	Zac	Produced & Directed by Tissy Nnachi for Rok TV	
2021	Chance At Love	Udoka		
2021	Made for More	Ronald		
2021	Hells Candidate	Emeka	Produced by Onyiye Udezeh	
2021	A hole in my heart	Jide	Produced by Blessing Jessica Nze	
2021	My Older kids	Victor	Produced by Emem Iniobong	
2021	The beginning of After	Kachi	produced by Uche Mbunabo	
2021	Small World	Alex	Produced by Kingsley Okereke	
2021	What matters Most	Emmanuel	Directed by Uduak Ubong Patrick	
2021	Wistful hearts	Alex	Produced by Onyinye Udezeh	
2022	Side Chicks	Jide	Produced and directed by Stanley OBI	
2022	Blossom	Olaseni	Produced and directed by Biodun Stephen	
2022	Baby present	Lawrence	directed by Emma Anyaka	
2022	Tit for Tat	Ladipo	produced and directed by Tissy Nnachi	
2022	Broken Glass	Fred	produced and directed by Victor Okpala	
2022	Thicker than blood	Nduka	Produced by Rich Rock productions, directed by Uduak Ubong Patrick	
2022	Out of Sight	Raymond	Produced by Oakfil	
2023	Single Ladies	Kachi	Directed by Ernest OBI	
2023	Rivalry	Peter	Produced by Kingsley Okereke	
2023	When forever ends	Ebuka	produced by Sunnyrichy Tv	
2023	Pickled	Daniel	Produced by Bolaji Ogunmola	
2023	Fate's Scribble	Kenneth	produced by Uche Ben	
2023	A Christmas thrill	Francis	Produced by Abdul Salam Mumuni and directed by Chris Eneng	
2023	Destined	Ebube	Produced and directed by Simon Peacemaker	
2023	The good Neighbour	Hamza	Produced by Amb Pat	

=== Movies produced ===
Title	Role	Ref
Fate’s Scribble	Kenneth	
Complicated	Ugo	
Lost Treasure	General Uche	
Chance	Richard	
Girl Number 41	Tony	

== Personal life ==
In 2018, Nwaezeapu married Lauren Agokei.

== See also ==
- List of Nigerian film producers
