= Abobaku =

2010 Nigerian epic film

- Directed by: Niji Akanni
- Written by: Dapo Olawale
- Produced by: Femi Odugbemi
- Cinematography: Niji Akanni
- Production company: DVWORX Studio
- Release date: 2010
- Running time: 35 minutes
- Country: Nigeria
- Languages: Yoruba and subtitled in English

Abobaku is a 2010 short film written and produced by Femi Odugbemi and directed by Niji Akanni.

== Synopsis ==
Aremu who must die with the king (Abobaku) was caught between pleasing his lover and following the tradition. He later got to know the king was poisoned by one of the Chiefs hence his health could be preserved as he pleases his pregnant partner.

== Awards ==
The film won the Most Outstanding Short Film at the Zuma Film Festival held in 2010 and Best Costume at the 6th Africa Movie Academy Awards as held on 10 April 2010 at the Gloryland Cultural Center in Yenagoa, Bayelsa State, Nigeria.

== Reception ==
10 years after Abobaku was released, it was played at Wole Soyinka International Cultural Exchange to celebrate the writer's 86th birthday . The film was similar to Wole Soyinka's Play ' Death and the King's Horsemen's.
