= World Ecological Safety Assembly =

The World Ecological Safety Assembly (WESA) is an international Conference which is held by International Ecological Safety Collaborative Organization (IESCO) every two years. The Presidium of WESA is the highest authority of IESCO.

== Conferences ==
1. Year 2010 in Phnom Penh
2. Year 2012 in Bali
