= Independent Television Producers Association of Nigeria =

Umbrella body of Media professionals

The Independent Television Producers Association of Nigeria (ITPAN) is the umbrella body of Media professionals in the Nigerian Media and Television Industry. The association was established in 1992 by Chief T. Oloyede, Steve Rhodes and Alex Oduro. The first elected President of ITPAN was Elder Steve Rhodes who was elected on 29 November 1993 in Lagos, Nigeria.

== Activities ==
The activities organised by ITPAN include trainings on Film Scriptwriting, Digital Video Production, Digital Cinematography and Film Production Management.

The past presidents include; the founder Elder Steve Rhodes, Chief Tunde Oloyede, Femi Odugbemi, Jaiye Ojo, Busola Holloway, Stephen Imoboho, and Adeyinka Oluwole Oduniyi.
