= Bariga Boys =

2009 Nigerian Documentary film

- Directed by: Femi Odugbemi
- Produced by: Femi Odugbemi
- Starring: Segun Adefila and the Crown Troupe
- Production company: DVWorx
- Release date: 2009
- Country: Nigeria

Bariga Boys is a 2009 Nigerian documentary about street performers Segun Adefila and the Crown Troupe, who use guerrilla theatre, music and drama to address issues of poverty in the slums of Bariga in Lagos.
