= Waidi Akanni =

Nigerian footballer

Personal information
- Full name: Waidi Akanni
- Date of birth: 20 June 1968 (age 58)
- Place of birth: Surulere, Lagos State, Nigeria
- Height: 1.80 m (5 ft 11 in)
- Position: Defender

Youth career
- 1980: NAOC FC
- 1981–1982: KODA FC

College career
| Years | Team | Apps | (Gls) |
| 1987–1989 | Howard University | | |

Senior career*
| Years | Team | Apps | (Gls) |
| 1983–1985 | NEPA Lagos | | |
| 1985–1986 | Flash Flamingoes | | |
| 1990 | Boston Bolts | | |
| ? | Maryland FC | | |

International career
| 1984–1985 | Nigeria U20 | ?? | |
| 1986–1989 | Nigeria | ?? | |
- * Club domestic league appearances and goals as of 25 July 2009

Waidi Akanni, also known as Waheed Akanni, (born 20 June 1968) is a former Nigerian football defender and former head of the Lagos State Football Association.

== Career ==
Born in Surulere, Lagos State, Akanni began playing football for local side NEPA Lagos in 1983. He joined another local side, Flash Flamingoes, in 1985.

In 1988, Akanni attended Howard University in the United States, earning bachelor's and master's degrees in engineering. He played for the university's soccer team and was the NCAA Men's Soccer Championship runner-up and the team's leading scorer with sixteen goals. He was also selected to the All-American first team. While in the United States, he also played for Boston Bolts and Maryland FC.

Akanni played for the Nigeria national under-20 football team that won the bronze medal at the 1985 FIFA World Youth Championship finals in the Soviet Union. He would also play for the senior Nigeria national football team, appearing in a 1988 African Cup of Nations qualifying match against Sierra Leone and a 1990 FIFA World Cup qualifying match against Cameroon.
