= Kazeem Akanni Jimoh =

Nigerian Economist

Kazeem Akanni Jimoh is a Nigerian agricultural economist and a research scientist with the Forestry Research Institute of Nigeria (FRIN) who won the United Nations Educational, Scientific and Cultural Organization (UNESCO) Man and the Biosphere (MAB) Award under the category of MAB young scientist of 2019 at the age of 27. He is the third Nigerian to receive the UNESCO MAB award and also has a first degree in Agricultural Economics from the University of Maiduguri.

== Early life and education ==
Kazeem Akanni Jimoh attended the University of Maiduguri and the University of Ibadan. He obtained a first-class degree in Agricultural Economics from the University of Maiduguri and a master's degree in Agricultural Economics from the University of Ibadan. He made history as the only Nigerian among seven scientists globally to receive the UNESCO MAB Young Scientist of 2019 at the age of 27. He is also the third Nigerian ever to receive such an award towards the programme aimed at promoting a new generation of scientists worldwide addressing ecological and sustainability issues. His work that attracted the MAB Young Scientist award focused on the “Impact of green economy in biosphere reserve project (GEBR) as an alternative livelihood source on the poverty status of Omo biosphere Reserve communities”.

== Career ==
Following his research career, he started his career at the Forestry Research Institute of Nigeria (FRIN) as a research scientist within the research coordinating unit since July, 2015. His research works revolves around Agriculture, livestock and developmental issues. As a research scientist, he has published a number of eight research papers that revolve around agricultural, environmental and welfare economic areas.

== Awards ==
Kazeem Akanni Jimoh received an award in 2019 for the UNESCO Man and the Biosphere (MAB) Young scientist, the only Nigerian among seven other scientists to receive such an award in 2019.
