= Unmasked: Leadership, Trust and the COVID-19 =

2021 film by Femi Odugbemi and Kadaria Ahmed

- Directed by: Femi Odugbemi; Kadaria Ahmed
- Release date: 2021
- Running time: 117 minutes

Unmasked: Leadership, Trust and the COVID-19 is a 2021 documentary that depicts the unpreparedness of Nigerians during the COVID-19 that bedeviled the world. The 117 minutes video was written and produced by veteran film producer, Femi Odugbemi and Kadaria Ahmed. The movie also explores the response of many Nigerians to the pandemic using the experiences of their struggle for survival. The movie also explores the intervention of the Government and the Non Governmental Agencies to provide relief for the masses and yet it wasn't enough. The movie exposed the gap in the economy sector in tackling the Pandemic as well as the suffering of the poor masses when the country was locked down. The movie was sponsored by MacArthur Foundation, Central Bank of Nigeria (CBN) and PLAC under the production company of Daria Media and Zuri24 Media.

== Settings ==
The documentary was filmed inside the isolation centers, Intensive Care Units in Lagos and Kaduna. It also featured the hungry and the destitutes Almajiri in Kano.

== Premiere ==
The film was released in March 2021 and was first premiered at the 2021 iREP International Documentary Film Festival to an international professional audience across four continents. It was premiered on Channels TV on Thursday 8 April 2021 and another scheduled was made for 5 pm on the same TV station and the same time on April 15 and 22. It was premiered in Lagos on May 7 at the Civic Centre, Lagos and on the 29 May 2021 it premiered at the International Institute of Tropical Agriculture (IITA) in Ibadan.
