= Heroes & Zeros (film) =

2012 film by Niji Akanni

Heroes and Zeros
- Theatrical release poster
- Directed by: Niji Akanni
- Written by: Niji Akanni
- Produced by: Koga Studios
- Starring: Bimbo Manuel; Nadia Buari; Olu Jacobs; Tina Mba; Norbert Young; Gabriel Afolayan; Akin Lewis
- Cinematography: Alfred Chia
- Edited by: Abimbola Taiwo
- Music by: Femi Ogunronbi
- Production company: Koga Studios
- Release date: August 31, 2012 (Lagos premiere)
- Country: Nigeria
- Language: English

Heroes and Zeroes is a 2012 Nigerian drama film written and directed by Niji Akanni. It stars Nadia Buari, Bimbo Manuel and Olu Jacobs. It premiered on August 31, 2012 at Silverbird Galleria, Lagos. It was nominated in six categories at the 9th Africa Movie Academy Awards, winning awards for Best Director, Best Screenplay and Best Editing.

The film tells a story about the relationship between a 45-year-old married film director, Amos (Bimbo Manuel), and a film actress, Tonia (Nadia Buari). Amos is having troubles in his marriage and wants to be an international soccer star. His wife, Tinuke (Tina Mba), works in a financial institution and is having difficulty coping with the death of her only child. Amos is given the chance to be part of a big-budget film that revives his career in the industry. Obsessed by Tonia, the lead actress, he begins an extramarital affair.

== Plot ==
Amos Ayefele, a film director, has lost his passion for filmmaking and is struggling with financial difficulties that strain his marriage. Amidst his midlife crisis and unrealistic aspirations of becoming an international soccer player in his 40s, Ayefele reluctantly accepts the offer to direct a Nigerian-French collaborative film project. During the auditions, he is immediately drawn to Tonia and casts her in the lead role, believing she resembles a woman he met years ago in Kaduna. When he shares this belief with Tonia, she is angered by his insistence that they have met before.

Meanwhile, Ayoade Abba, a conservative investigative journalist, faces pressure from his publisher, Chief Ikudabo, due to low sales resulting from Ayoade's restrained reporting style. In contrast, his colleague Diba, a young and ambitious photographer, aggressively pursues sensational stories for the tabloid.

As Ayefele becomes increasingly obsessed with Tonia, his infatuation begins to affect his personal life, leading him to make drastic decisions, including sending his wife away in a desperate attempt to win Tonia's affection.

== Cast ==
- Nadia Buari as Tonia Amabibi
- Olu Jacobs as Chief Ikudabo
- Norbert Young as Nnamdi
- Tina Mba as Tinuke Amos Fela
- Gabriel Afolayan as Dibu Ijele
- Akin Lewis as Ayoade Alba
- Bimbo Manuel as Amos Ayefele
- Linda Ejiofor as Bisola Amabibi
- Adeniyi Johnson as Shehu
- Jumoke Odetola

== Release ==
It was premiered in Lagos on August 31, 2012. The American premiere was held shortly afterwards. The film was released in theaters nationwide on September 7, 2012. In 2013, it premiered in the UK on March 15 at Odeon Cinema.

== Reception ==
=== Critical reception ===
It received a 62% rating from Nollywood Reinvented, which noted that despite being a well executed film, it might not resonate with the average Nollywood film watcher, given its intellectual bent. In 2014, it was listed as the 9th best African film by Answers Africa. Owing to its attribution to real events, it was also listed as one of the seven best Nollywood films that are based on true events.

=== Accolades ===
List of Awards
Award	Category	Recipients and nominees	Result
Africa Film Academy (9th Africa Movie Academy Awards)	Best Editing	Abimbola Taiwo	Won
Africa Film Academy (9th Africa Movie Academy Awards)	Best Screenplay	Niji Akanni	Won
Africa Film Academy (9th Africa Movie Academy Awards)	Best Actor	Bimbo Manuel	Nominated
Africa Film Academy (9th Africa Movie Academy Awards)	Best Director	Niji Akanni	Won
Africa Film Academy (9th Africa Movie Academy Awards)	Best Nigerian Film	Niji Akanni	Nominated
Africa Film Academy (9th Africa Movie Academy Awards)	Best Sound	Mohammed Musulumi	Nominated
