= Lepa Shandy =

Nigerian actress (born 1971)

Shade Omoniyi
- Born: Folashade Omoniyi; 16 April 1971 (age 55); Oshogbo, Osun State, Nigeria
- Other name: Lepa Shandy
- Education: University of Lagos
- Occupation: Actress
- Years active: 1995-Present
- Children: 2

Shade Omoniyi (born Folashade Omoniyi; 16 April 1971), better known by her sobriquet Lepa Shandy, is a Nigerian Yoruba movie actress who was described by the Nigerian media as "a veteran and one of the pioneers of the Yoruba movie industry" Omoniyi's sobriquet Lepa Shandy was a character she played in a movie with the same title.

== Early life and education ==
Omoniyi is a native of Osogbo in Osun State but was raised in Lagos state where she attended Ire Akari Primary School and obtained her First School Leaving Certificate from, then proceeded to Isolo Comprehensive High School where she obtained her West African Senior School Certificate Examination form. Omoniyi then applied to the University of Lagos and was admitted to study Data Processing.

== Career ==
Omoniyi debuted into the Nigerian entertainment industry in 1995. At first, she was a model due to her slim features then later on became a make-up artist for actors before debuting her acting career in the Nigerian Nollywood movie industry in 1996 where she played short roles in English speaking movies. She debuted with the movie titled Breaking Point before switching to the Nigerian Yoruba movie industry where she landed her breakthrough role as the title character in Lepa Shandy, a Yoruba movie produced by Bayowa which became a blockbuster and formed the foundation for Omoniyi's acting career.

== Recognition ==
Omoniyi celebrated her 45th birthday on 16 April 2016 and also premiered her new movie titled 'Eri Ife Leyi' on the same day and at the same venue where she celebrated her birthday. Omoniyi's birthday and movie premiere was attended by her colleagues and also by Former First Lady of Lagos State, Abimbola Fashola.

== Personal life ==
Omoniyi is married and has two children.

== Selected filmography ==
- Gidi Blues (2016) as Liquor Seller
- Eri Ife Leyi (2016)
- Nkan Agbara (2008)
- Akámó (2007)
- Iru Kileyi (2007)
- Iyawo Elenu Razor (2006)
- Ògo ìdílé (2004)
- Oyato (2003)
- Perosoko (2003) as Mosunmola
- Tim ba Taiye Wa (2003)
- Kosorogun (2002)
- Lepa Shandy (1999)
- Breaking Point (1996)
