= Code Wilo =

- Directed by: Mike-Steve Adeleye
- Produced by: Hauwa Allahbura
- Starring: Zack Orji, Eucharia Anunobi, Yaw Comedian, Uzo Arukwe and Gabriel Afolayan
- Cinematography: Pindem Lot
- Production company: Cut24 Production
- Release date: 2019
- Country: Nigeria

Code Wilo is a 2019 Nigerian movie about the political happenings of the 2019 Nigerian gubernatorial elections. It projects the need to give space to women and youths in the country's election. Code Wilo was produced by Hauwa Allahbura and directed by Mike-Steve Adeleye; it stars Zack Orji, Eucharia Anunobi, Yaw Comedian, Uzo Arukwe and Gabriel Afolayan

== Synopsis ==
The movies revolves around a young lady, Nimi, who is an aspirant for gubernatorial election. She was kidnapped and interactions with her kidnappers reveal it is not just for ransom. The film also discusses the issue of "godfatherism" in Nigerian politics with Nimi's, father's sole decision to make her a governorship candidate

== Premiere ==
The movie was first premiered in collaboration with Heritage Bank on the 7 of March 2019 at Terra Kulture, Victoria Island, Lagos.

== Cast ==
- Gabriel Afolayan
- Eucharia Abinibi Ekwu
- Bikiya Graham Douglas
- Kalu Ikeagwu
- Alex Usifo Omiagbo
- Steve Onu (Yaw)
- Zack Orji
- Gbenga Titiloye
