= Nigerian Film Corporation =

Government-owned agency regulating Nigerian films

Agency overview
- Formed: 1979; 47 years ago
- Jurisdiction: Federal government of Nigeria
- Headquarters: 14 lKowa Road, 930103, Jos
- Federal minister responsible: Barr. Hannatu Musa Musawa
- Agency executive: Ali Nuhu, Managing Director
- Parent ministry: Federal Ministry of Art, Culture, Tourism and the Creative Economy
- Website: NFC on Bureau of Public Enterprises

Nigerian Film Corporation is a government-owned agency that regulates Nigerian films. It was established in 1979 under decree number 61 of the 1979 constitution. The NFC operates as a parastatal of the Federal Government of Nigeria, overseen by the Federal Ministry of Art, Culture, Tourism, and the Creative Economy. Governed by an enabling act, the corporation is mandated to establish a robust framework for fostering a thriving and enduring film industry and cinema culture in Nigeria. Through its initiatives, the Corporation actively contributes to the socio-economic advancement of the nation. Currently, the Corporation is undergoing transformation processes to align with the African Union charter on communication and audiovisual and to evolve into a Film Commission and is currently being headed by popular Nigerian actor Ali Nuhu, who was appointed as Managing Director by President Bola Ahmed Tinubu in January 2024. The corporation now functions under the unified [Federal [Ministry of Art, Culture, Tourism and Creative Economy] with Barr. Hannatu Musawa as Minister.

== Function ==
The functions of the Nigerian Film Corporation include:

- The production of films for domestic consumption and export
- The establishment and maintenance of facilities for film production The encouragement of the production by Nigerians of films through financial and other forms of assistance The provision of facilities for training and archiving of film, sound and video materials, like the Shoot training programme, etc The encouragement of the development of cinematograph theatres in Nigerian y Nigerians by way of financial and other forms of assistance
- The acquisition and distribution of films Industry support services Film festivals and the Nigeria International Film festivals Conducting research into matters pertaining to film and the industry as a whole
- The carrying out of such or other activities as may be necessary and expedient for the full discharge of all or any of the functions conferred under or pursuant to the Act establishing the NFC.

== Shareholding structure ==
The Nigerian Film Corporation (NFC) is 100% owned by the Federal Government of Nigeria (FGN).
