= Niji Akanni =

Nigerian film director

- Born: Akanni Adeniji; August 12, 1962 (age 64); Abeokuta, Ogun State
- Citizenship: Nigerian
- Education: Obafemi Awolowo University, Ile-Ife
- Occupations: screenwriter; filmmaker; director; producer; dramatist; playwright
- Notable work: Aramotu; Heroes and Zeros; The Narrow Path; Dangerous Twins

Niji Akanni is a Nigerian dramatist, screenwriter, director, producer and filmmaker.

== Education ==
Akanni received a Bachelor of Arts degree in Dramatic Arts from Obafemi Awolowo University and a master's degree in Film Studies from the University of Ibadan as well as a professional master's degree (MFA) in Screenplay Writing and Film Directing from the Film and Television Institute of India.

== Career ==
He has scripted, co-scripted and directed several notable Nigerian films and reality shows.

As one of Nigeria's official three theatrical presentations at the 2012 Cultural Olympiad in London, he directed The Lion and the Jewel, a play by Nigerian writer, Professor Wole Soyinka that was first performed in 1959. In 2005, he was Assistant Director of the first season of Amstel Malta Box Office, a Nigerian Reality Television Show.

In 2006, he was Content Director on Big Brother Nigeria, the same year he co-scripted, The Narrow Path, a 95 minutes film produced by Mainframe Films and Television Productions and directed by Tunde Kelani. The film, which featured Sola Asedeko and Khabirat Kafidipe was adapted from The Virgin, a debut novel of Bayo Adebowale. In 2008, he directed Abobaku, a short film in Super-16mm gauge, produced by Femi Odugbemi on the MNET's New Directions project. Abobaku won several awards, including the Most Outstanding Short Film award at the 2010 ZUMA Film Festival in Abuja, Nigeria; Best Costume at the 6th Africa Movie Academy Awards held on 10 April 2010 at the Gloryland Cultural Center in Yenagoa, Bayelsa State, Nigeria; and was also judged Best Short Film at the 2010 TERRACOTA Awards in Lagos, Nigeria.

In 2010, he wrote and directed Aramotu, a Nigerian drama digital film that stars Gabriel Afolayan. The film received 7 nominations at the 7th Africa Movie Academy Awards and won the awards for Best Nigerian Film and Best Costume Design. It also emerged as the Best Feature Film at Africa International Film Festival, held in Calabar in May 2013. Aramotu screened at various film festivals across the world, including the 2012 Samsung Women's International Film Festival (SWIFF) in Chennai, India; 2012 Africa In The Picture (AITP) film festival, Amsterdam; 2013 Arusha African International Film Festival (AIFF), Tanzania; and 2013 International Film Festival of Kerala (IFFK), India.

He scripted and directed Heroes and Zeros, a Nigerian drama film that stars Nadia Buari, Bimbo Manuel, Gabriel Afolayan, Linda Ejiofor and Olu Jacobs. The film was released on September 7, 2012 and premiered in the UK on March 15, 2013 at Odeon Cinema. The film won the Most Outstanding Film and Audience Choice awards at the 2013 EKO International Film Festival and competed in the digital film category of the 2013 Pan African Film and Television Festival, FESPACO, in Ouagadougou, Burkina Faso. It was invited to the 2013 International Film Festival of Kerala, IFFK, in India, and was also screened at the 2014 Afrikamera Film Festival in Warsaw, Poland. It received 6 nominations at the 9th Africa Movie Academy Awards and won the awards for Best Editing, Best Screenplay and Best Director

== Filmography ==
Title	Written	Directed	Produced	Year
The Narrow Path	Tunde Kelani and Niji Akanni	Tunde Kelani	Mainframe Films and Television Productions	2006
Abobaku	Femi Odugbemi	Niji Akanni	Femi Odugbemi	2008
Aramotu	Niji Akanni	Niji Akanni	Yinka Kolapo	2010
Heroes and Zeros	Niji Akanni	Niji Akanni	Christopher Jeyibo	2012

== Accolades ==
The table below highlighted the awards and nominations received by Niji Akanji and his films.

List of Major Awards
Award	Category	Recipients and nominees	Result
Yoruba Movie Academy (3rd Yoruba Movie Academy Awards)	Best Cultural Movie	Niji Akanni	Won
Yoruba Movie Academy (3rd Yoruba Movie Academy Awards)	Achievement in Directing	Niji Akanni	Won
Yoruba Movie Academy (3rd Yoruba Movie Academy Awards)	Best Picture	Niji Akanni	Won
Africa Film Academy (7th Africa Movie Academy Awards)	Best Nigerian Film	Niji Akanni	Won
Africa Film Academy (7th Africa Movie Academy Awards)	Best Film	Niji Akanni	Nominated
Africa Film Academy (7th Africa Movie Academy Awards)	Best Best Director	Niji Akanni	Nominated
Africa Film Academy (7th Africa Movie Academy Awards)	Best Film in an African Language	Niji Akanni	Nominated
Africa Film Academy (7th Africa Movie Academy Awards)	Best Visual Effects		Nominated
Africa Film Academy (7th Africa Movie Academy Awards)	Best Costume Design	Niji Akanni	Won
Africa Film Academy (7th Africa Movie Academy Awards)	Africa Film Academy (9th Africa Movie Academy Awards)		
Best Screenplay	Africa Film Academy (9th Africa Movie Academy Awards)	Niji Akanni	Won
Best Director	Africa Film Academy (9th Africa Movie Academy Awards)	Niji Akanni	Won
Best Nigerian Film	Africa Film Academy (9th Africa Movie Academy Awards)	Niji Akanni	Nominated
Best Sound	Africa Film Academy (9th Africa Movie Academy Awards)	Niji Akanni	Nominated

== See also ==
- List of Nigerian film producers
