= Forestry Research Institute of Nigeria =

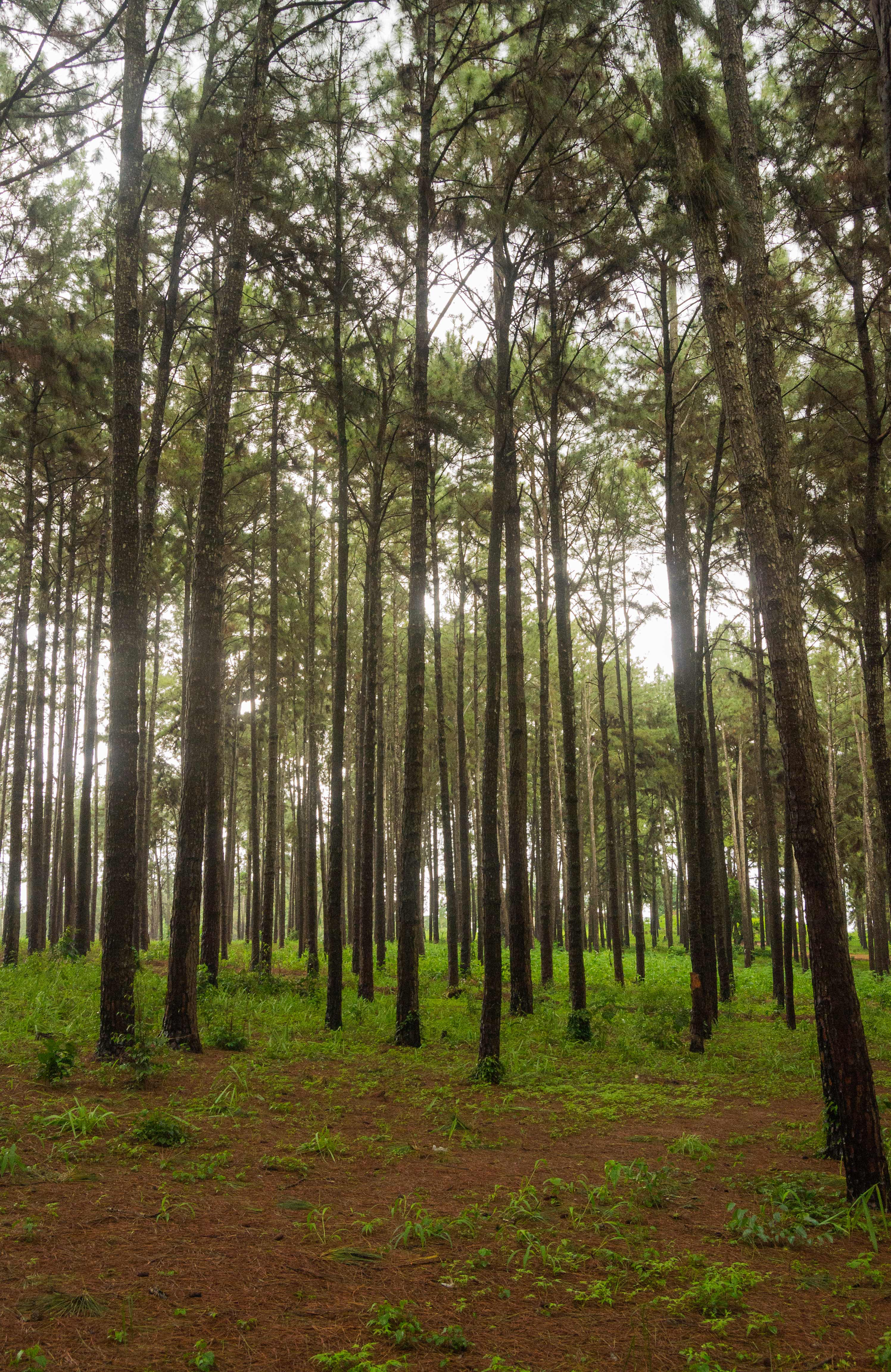
- Ngwo pine forest
- Established: 1954
- Address: Ibadan
- Location: Ibadan, Nigeria
- Coordinates: 7.3911°N 3.8582°E
- Interactive map of Forestry Research Institute of Nigeria
- Website: Forestry Research Institute of Nigeria

Forestry Research Institute of Nigeria (FRIN) is the Nigerian Government agency that is responsible for forestry research. It has is headquarter at Jericho, Ibadan.

FRIN was established as the Federal Department of Forestry Research in 1954. The status was changed to an institute in 1977.

FRIN seeks to achieve sustainable development goals by preserving forest ecosystem services, uplifting local communities and contributing to global sustainability goals.

The index herbarium code for the Forest Herbarium Ibadan, the herbarium associated with FRIN, is FHI.

FRIN operates the Federal College of Forestry in Ibadan (FEDCOFOR). It is charged with training and developing Forestry and Agricultural practice. FEDCOFOR has six specialized research departments and three support departments. It is a mono-technic institution, offering both the National Diploma (ND) in Forestry technology, Agricultural technology, Wood and Paper technology, Horticulture and landscape technology, Crop production technology and Higher National Diploma (HND) in Forestry technology, Wood and Paper technology, Horticulture and landscape technology, Crop production technology and Agricultural Extension management.
