= Jahman Anikulapo =

Nigerian culture archivist (born 1963)

- Born: Jahman Oladejo Anikulapo; 16 January 1963 (age 63)
- Other name: Jahmo
- Education: University of Ibadan
- Occupation: Journalist
- Years active: 1993–present

Jahman Oladejo Anikulapo (born 16 January 1963) is a Nigerian journalist, culture activist, and culture archivist.

== Biography ==
Anikulapo studied Theatre Arts in University of Ibadan. He began his art journalism career at The Guardian in 1987 straight from the National Youth Service and rose to the position of Assistant Arts Editor in 1992, replacing playwright Ben Tomoloju, who was retiring. Anikulapo became the Arts and Media Editor in 1993, and deputy Editor of The Guardian in 1999. He was then promoted Editor of The Guardian on Sunday in 2003 with added Editor of The GuardianLife Magazine (2005) until 2013, when he left The Guardian to focus mainly on being the Executive Programme Director of Culture Advocates Caucus (CAC), a position he assumed in 2012. Anikulapo has been the Programme Chairman of the Committee for Relevant Art (CORA) since 1993. He was mentored by Dapo Adelugba, a theatre critic and playwright at the University of Ibadan.

== Personal life ==
Jahman Anikulapo has a son, Seunrere, and a daughter, Malia. He was recognised by the president of Nigeria Muhammadu Buhari on his 60th birthday for his contributions towards the growth of Nigerian literature through the years.
