= Banji Oyelaran-Oyeyinka =

Nigerian economist

Professor Banji Oyelaran-Oyeyinka
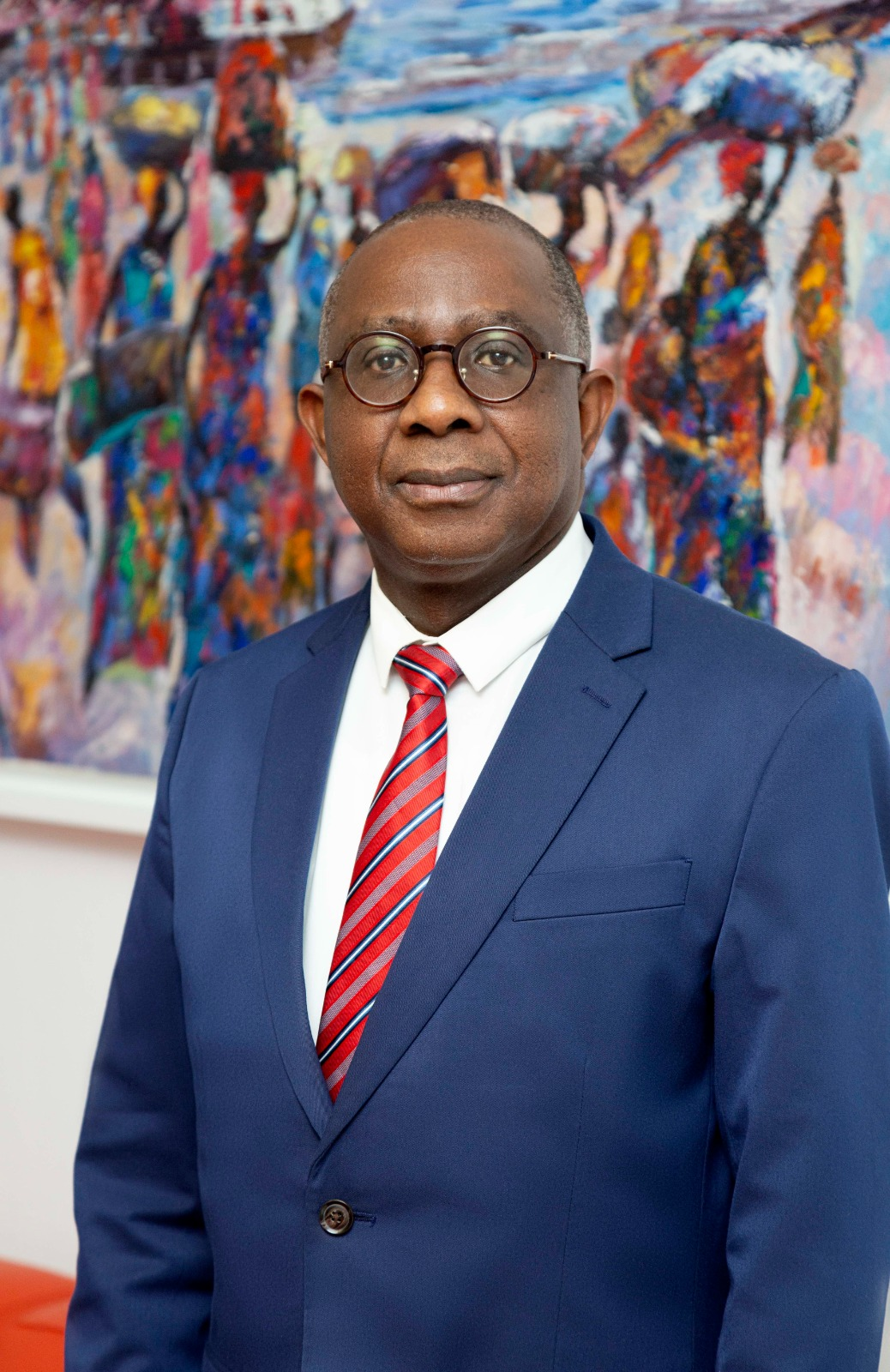
- Born: Banji Oyelaran-Oyeyinka
- Education: Obafemi Awolowo University (BSc, Chemical Engineering) University of Toronto (MSc, Chemical Engineering) University of Sussex (D.Phil., Development Economics in Industrialization Innovation and Technology Policy)
- Occupations: Author, and economist
- Organization(s): African Development Bank, United Nations
- Known for: First Nigerian Professor in Industrialization Innovation and Technology Policy
- Website: banjioyeyinka.com

Banji Oyelaran-Oyeyinka is a scholar, researcher, and professor in economics, innovation, and technology management in developing countries. He serves as the senior special adviser on industrialization to the president of the African Development Bank (AfDB). He is also a member of the Advisory Council on Industrialization of the African Continental Free Trade Area (AfCFTA) and has received the National Productivity Order of Merit.

== Early life and education ==
Banji Oyelaran-Oyeyinka was born in Nigeria and pursued higher education in engineering and economics. He earned a BSc in chemical engineering from Obafemi Awolowo University, followed by an MSc in chemical engineering from the University of Toronto. He later obtained a D.Phil. in Development Economics from the University of Sussex. He is a Fellow of the Nigerian Academy of Engineering and the Nigerian Society of Chemical Engineers.

== Career ==
Banji Oyelaran-Oyeyinka is an academic and administrator, known for his contributions to the field of Development Economics in Nigeria and Africa.

He was a professor at the United Nations University – Institute for New technologies (UNU-INTECH) from 2001 to 2006. He is the first Nigerian professor in first Nigerian professor in Industrialization Innovation and Technology Policy and a visiting professor at the United Nations University – MERIT, Netherlands and the Open University, UK.

He served at the United Nations (UN) system for 20 years, his last positions been Director, Regional Office for Africa, Chief Scientific Advisor, UN-HABITAT, and Director Monitoring & Research Division. He was Senior Economic Adviser, UN Centre on Trade and Development (UNCTAD), Geneva where he coordinated the ten-year review of performance of Least Developed Countries (LDCs). He was also a member of the Governing Council of the Nigerian Institute of Social and Economic Research (NISER).

== Books and publications ==
Banji has authored and co-authored some books that have contributed to the field of Development Economics. Here are some of his books:

- Industrialization and Economic Diversification: Post Crisis Development Agenda in Asia and Africa, co-authored with Kaushalesh Lal (2022)
- Resurgent Africa: Structural Transformation in Sustainable Development 2020
- Structural Transformation and Economic Development: Cross-Regional Analysis of Industrialization and Urbanization, Routledge Publishers (2017)
- Sustainable Industrialization in Africa: Toward a New Development Agenda, co-authored with Padmashree Gehl Sampath 2015
- Urban Innovation in China's Shanty Towns coauthored with Pengfei Ni and Fei Chen (2015)
- Rich Country Poor People: The Story of Nigeria's Poverty amid Plenty (2014)
- Uneven Paths of Development: Innovation and Learning in Asia and Africa, co-authored with Rajah Rasiah, Edward Elgar Publishing (2009)
- Latecomer Development: Knowledge and Innovation for Economic Growth, co-authored with Padmashree Gehl Sampath Routledge Publishing, (2010)
- The Gene Revolution and the Global Food Crisis: Biotechnology Capacity in Latecomer Countries, co-authored with Padmashree Gehl Sampath, Palgrave McMillan (2009)
- Learning to Compete in African Industry, Ashgate Publishing (2006)
- Industrial Clusters and Innovation Systems in Africa, co-authored with Dorothy Mc-Cormick, United Nations University Press, (2007)
