= La Campagne Tropicana Beach Resort =

Nigerian Luxury African-Styled Beach Resort

La Campagne Tropicana is a private 60-acre beach resort in Lekki, Lagos. La Campagne Tropicana Beach Resort combines an African themed hospitality with modern luxury. The beach resort has been patronized by world class dignitaries including ex-presidents, ministers and monarchs. La Campagne is regarded as one of the best beach resorts in Nigeria.

== Geography ==
This vibrant beach resort on the Gulf of Guinea is 78 kilometers from the Lekki Conservation Centre, 95 kilometers from the Nigerian National Museum, and 120 kilometers from Lagos Airport.

== Recreation ==
A restaurant, a bar, and outdoor pools are among the amenities, as are a gym, a children's playground, and 24-hour security. Horseback riding, basketball, and football, as well as kayaking and jet skiing, are all accessible.

Warm, circular chalets with thatched roofs, vivid furnishings, and decks are available, as are wooden treehouses with private pools, Jacuzzi baths, flat-screen TVs, and gulf views.

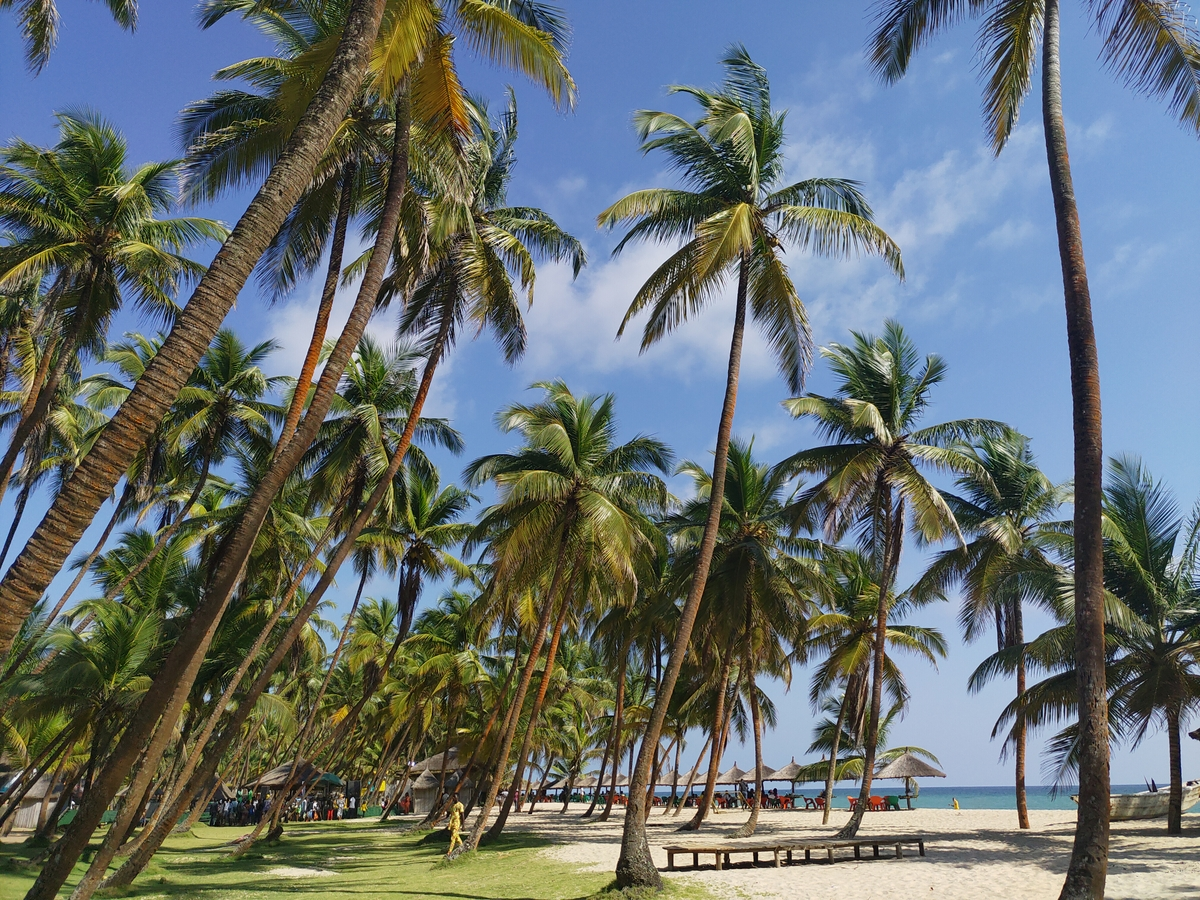
Palm grove coastline at La Campagne Tropicana

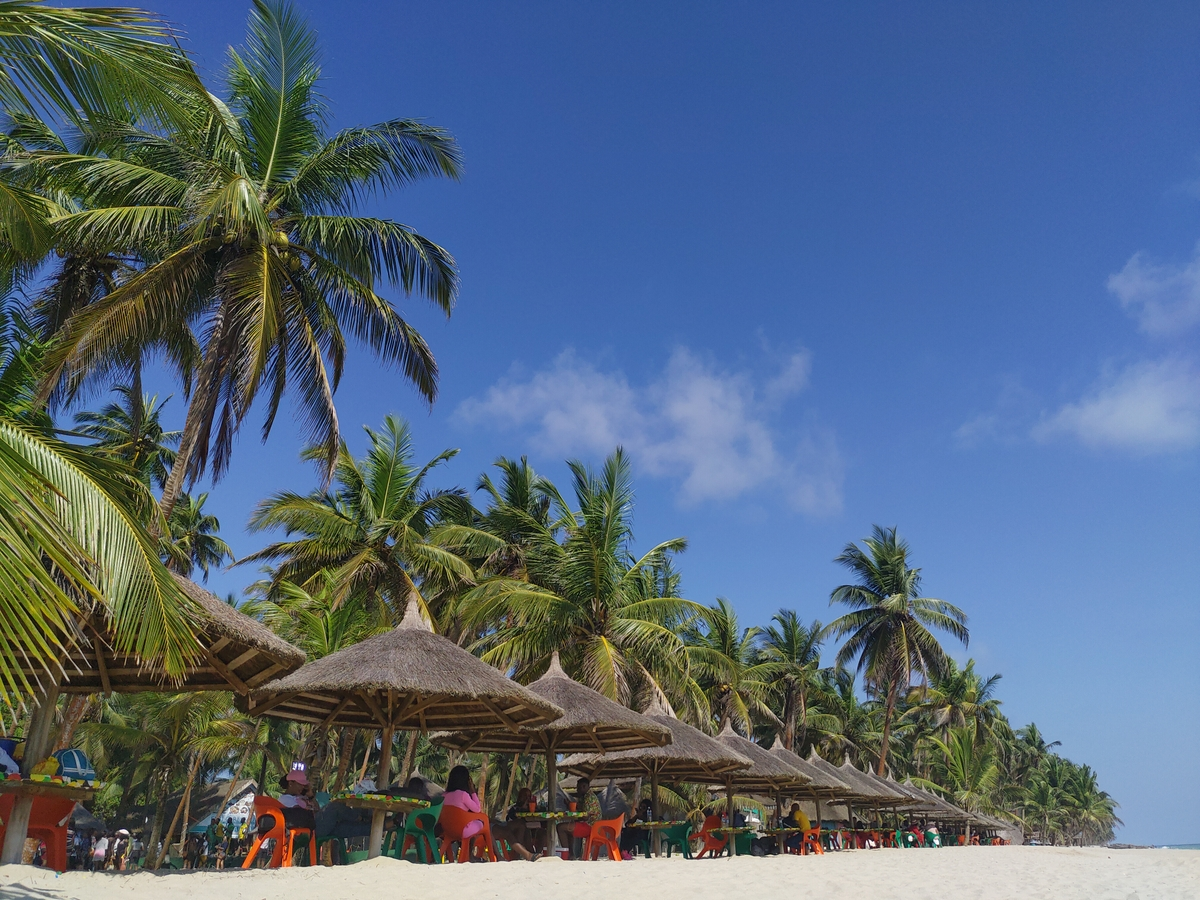
Coastline with parasols for guests

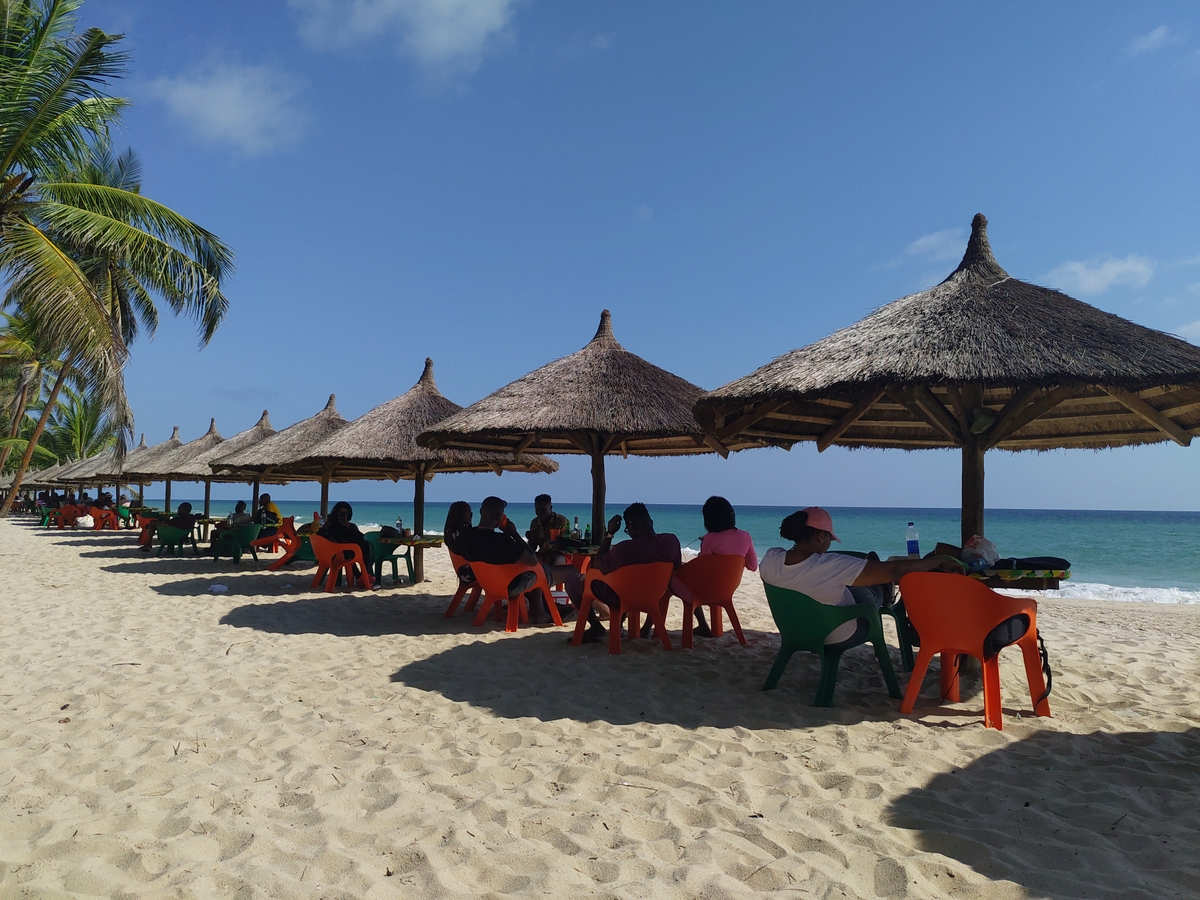
Beach lovers in shade

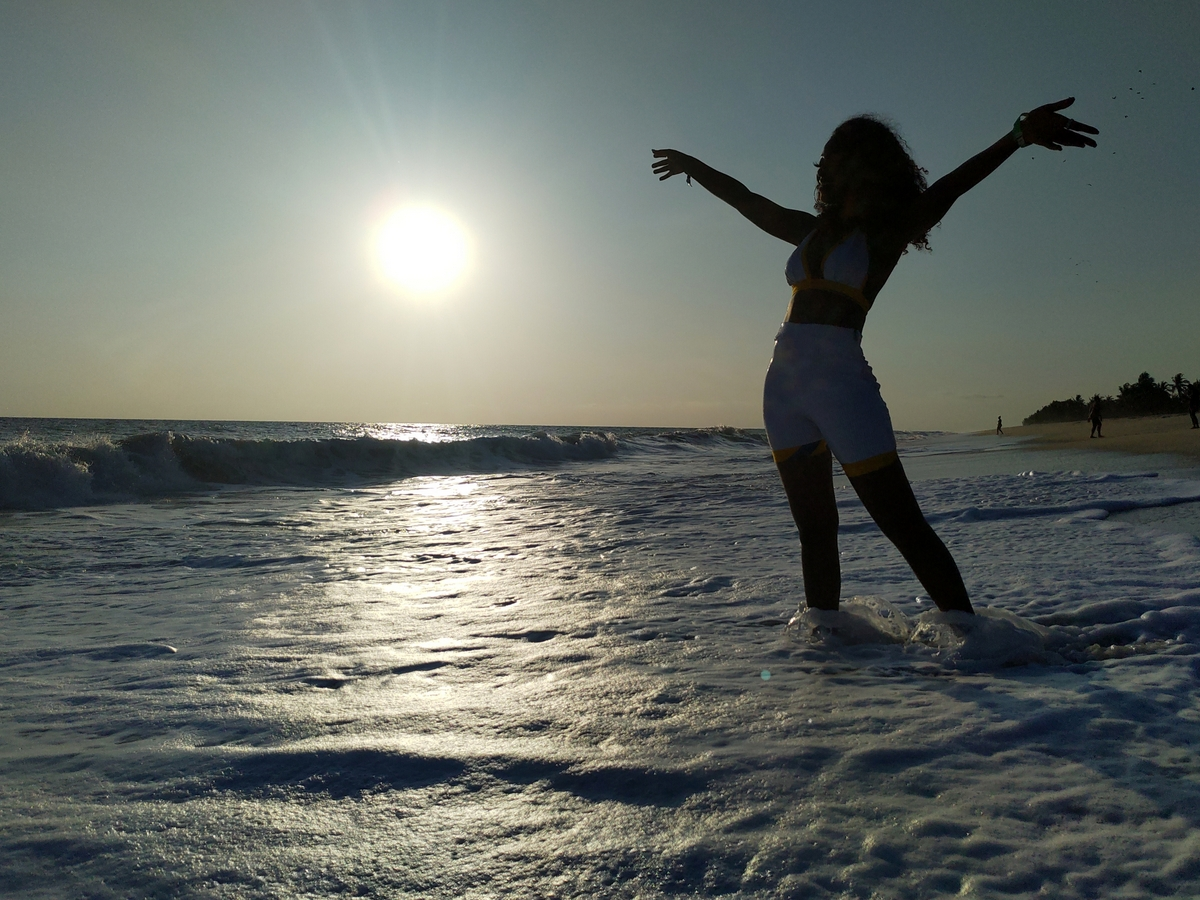
A beach lover at sunset
