= List of Nigerian film directors =

This is a list of notable Nigerian film directors.

- Onuora Abuah
- Amara Ogara
- Dagogo Diminas
- Toyin Abraham
- Adekunle Adejuyigbe
- Uyoyou Adia
- Ola Cardoso
- Ekene Som Mekwunye
- Yewande Adekoya
- Dolapo 'LowlaDee' Adeleke
- Wale Adenuga
- Funsho Adeolu
- Sikiru Adesina
- Kemi Adetiba
- Judith Audu
- Newton Aduaka
- Kunle Afolayan
- Toka Mcbaror
- Afro Candy
- Eric Aghimien
- Niji Akanni
- Mahmood Ali-Balogun
- Genevieve Nnaji
- Niyi Akinmolayan
- Pascal Amanfo
- Fred Amata
- Jeta Amata
- Bolaji Amusan
- Chet Anekwe
- Tosin Igho
- Frank Rajah Arase
- Ejike Asiegbu
- Pascal Atuma
- Ishaya Bako
- Ola Balogun
- Gloria Bamiloye
- Biyi Bandele
- Michelle Bello
- Teco Benson
- JJ Bunny
- Sam Dede
- Nonso Diobi
- Andrew Dosunmu
- Emamode Edosio
- Chico Ejiro
- Prince Eke
- Desmond Elliot
- Obi Emelonye
- Rick Famuyiwa
- Tam Fiofori
- Shan George
- Kenneth Gyang
- Lancelot Oduwa Imasuen
- Charles Uwagbai
- Chinedum Iregbu
- Dickson Iroegbu
- Uche Jombo
- Tunde Kelani
- Mak 'Kusare
- Akin Lewis
- Director Pink
- Ndave David Njoku
- Charles Novia
- Chike Nwoffiah
- Lonzo Nzekwe
- C. J. Obasi
- Saint Obi
- Femi Odugbemi
- Tade Ogidan
- Kingsley Ogoro
- Akin Ogungbe
- Wole Oguntokun
- Izu Ojukwu
- Stephanie Okereke Linus
- Mildred Okwo
- Mayowa Oluyeba
- Akin Omotoso
- Ikechukwu Onyeka
- Zack Orji
- Tope Oshin Ogun
- Olatunde Osunsanmi
- Clarence Peters
- Robert O. Peters
- Gbenga Salu
- Zina Saro-Wiwa
- Joke Silva
- Bob-Manuel Udokwu
- Uzee Usman
- Babatunde Agunloye
- Rogers Ofime
- Chijindu Kelechi Eke
