= List of Nigerian films of 2008 =

This is a list of Nigerian films released in 2008.

== Films ==
Title	Director	Cast	Genre	Notes	Ref
2008
Hottest Babes 1 and 2	Emeka Nwabueze	Oge Okoye Francis Duru Chika Ike Uche Jombo		Shot in English Language Released on DVD by Pressing Forward/Black Star Entertainment	
Jenifa 1 and 2	Muhydeen S. Ayinde	Funke Akindele Ronke Odusanya Mosunmola Filani Iyabo Ojo	Comedy	Shot in Yoruba Language and Pidgin Released on VCD by Olasco Films	
Liquid Black Gold	Ikenna Emma Aniekwe	Sam Dede Justus Esiri Enebeli Elebuwa Gentle Jack		Made in 2 parts	
Through the Glass	Stephanie Okereke	Stephanie Okereke Pascal Atuma Brion Rose Matthew Godbey	Comedy	Shot in English Language	

== See also ==
- List of Nigerian films
