= List of Nigerian film producers =

This is a list of notable Nigerian film producers.

- Funke Akindele
- Rashida Adamu Abdullah
- Abdalla Uba Adamu
- Adegboyega Dosunmu Amororo II
- Adekunle Adejuyigbe
- Ado Ahmad Gidan Dabino
- Afro Candy
- Malam Nata'ala
- Aisha Augie-Kuta
- Akin Ogungbe
- Remi Abiola
- Toyin Abraham
- Genevieve Nnaji
- Chinneylove Eze
- Judith Audu
- Odunlade Adekola
- Yewande Adekoya
- Dolapo 'LowlaDee' Adeleke
- Wale Adenuga
- Funsho Adeolu
- Kareem Adepoju
- Ayo Adesanya
- Sikiru Adesina
- Eric Aghimien
- Niji Akanni
- Biola Alabi
- Bose Alao
- Eddy Young
- Mahmood Ali-Balogun
- Fred Amata
- Jeta Amata
- Bolaji Amusan
- Chika Anadu
- Chet Anekwe
- Chineze Anyaene
- Pascal Atuma
- Gloria Bamiloye
- Michelle Bello
- Sadiq Daba
- Regina Daniels
- Caroline Danjuma
- Emamode Edosio
- Albert Egbe
- Zeb Ejiro
- Tam Fiofori
- Mercy Aigbe Gentry
- Shan George
- Paul Igwe
- Chris Ihidero
- Rotimi Adelola
- Lancelot Oduwa Imasuen
- Moses Inwang
- Emem Isong
- Ruth Kadiri
- Tunde Kelani
- Bisi Komolafe
- Obafemi Lasode
- Akin Lewis
- Lola Margaret
- Oliver Mbamara
- Toka McBaror
- Charles Uwagbai
- Echezonachukwu Nduka
- David Nnaji
- Charles Novia
- Benneth Nwankwo
- Onyeka Nwelue
- Chike Nwoffiah
- Lonzo Nzekwe
- Uche Odoh
- Dele Odule
- Mayowa Oluyeba
- Saint Obi
- Femi Odugbemi
- Tade Ogidan
- Kingsley Ogoro
- Iyabo Ojo
- Ronke Ojo
- Okechukwu Oku
- Ivie Okujaye
- Juliana Olayode
- Cossy Orjiakor
- Bimbo Oshin
- Wale Ojo
- Izu Ojukwu
- Tope Oshin
- Clarence Peters
- Babatunde Agunloye
- Robert O. Peters
- Zina Saro-Wiwa
- Ayo Shonaiya
- Sola Sobowale
- Bob-Manuel Udokwu
- Eddie Ugbomah
- Sam Ukala
- Mary Uranta
- Uzee Usman
- Uzo
- Remi Vaughan-Richards
- Rogers Ofime
- Temitope Duker
- Kunle Afolayan
- Moji Afolayan
- Ola Balogun
- Mike Bamiloye
- Moses Olaiya
- Femi Adebayo
- Laide Daramola
- Dayo Ajifowoke
- Kemi Adetiba
