= Balogun (name) =

Balogun is a title in the Yoruba language of West Africa which means "Warlord" or roughly translated to "father at war".

== Given name ==
- Balogun Yakub Abiodun (born 1951), Nigerian economist and public administrator

== Surname ==
- Ayodeji Balogun (born 1983), Nigerian businessman
- Christiana Balogun (born 1997), English Rugby Player
- Fathia Balogun (born 1969), Nigerian actress, filmmaker, producer and director
- Fausat Balogun (born 1959), Nigerian actress
- Femi Balogun (born 1992), Nigerian football player
- Folarin Balogun (born 2001), American soccer player
- Jeffrey Lawal-Balogun (born 1986), British track athlete
- Kuwasi Balagoon (1946-1986) American political activist and Black Panther Party member
- Lekan Balogun (born 1973), Nigerian dramatist and theatre director
- Leon Balogun (born 1988), German-born Nigerian football player
- Mahmood Ali-Balogun, Nigerian filmmaker
- Mike Balogun (born 1983), American football linebacker
- Mustafa Adebayo Balogun (born 1947), Nigerian public administrator
- Ola Balogun (born 1945), Nigerian filmmaker and scriptwriter
- Oluwafemi Daniel Balogun (born 1987), Nigerian chess player
- Oluwafemi Olaiya Balogun (born 1953), Nigerian public administrator
- Saheed Balogun (born 1967), Nigerian actor, filmmaker, director and producer
- Saidu Ayodele Balogun, Nigerian general and public administrator
- Subomi Balogun (1934–2023), Nigerian banker and philanthropist
- Teslim Balogun (1927–1972), Nigerian football player and coach
- Wizkid, stage name of Ayodeji Ibrahim Balogun (born 1990), Nigerian singer and songwriter
- Zainab Balogun (born 1989), Nigerian actress, model and television presenter
