= Balogun =

Balogun may refer to:

- Balogun (name)
- Balogun Market in Lagos, Nigeria
- Teslim Balogun Stadium in Lagos, Nigeria
