= Omotoyossi =

Omotoyossi is a surname. Notable people with the surname include:

- Bose Alao Omotoyossi (born 1985), Nigerian Nollywood actress
- Razak Omotoyossi (1985–2025), Beninise footballer
