= Adekoya =

- Gender: Male
- Language: Yoruba

Origin
- Origin: Nigerian
- Region of origin: South -West Nigeria

Adékọyà is a family name of Yoruba origin meaning "the crown or royalty rejects oppression or suffering".

== Notable people with the name ==
- Kemi Adekoya (born 1993), Nigerian-Bahraini track hurdler
- Oladipupo Adekoya Campbell (1919–2006), Nigerian musician and bandleader
- Seyi Adekoya (born 1995), American soccer player
- Yewande Adekoya (born 1984), Nigerian film actress, filmmaker, director and producer
