= Through the Glass =

2008 film by Stephanie Okereke

- Directed by: Stephanie Okereke
- Written by: Stephanie Okereke
- Produced by: Stephanie Okereke
- Starring: Garrett McKechnie; Christy Williams; Stephanie Okereke
- Cinematography: Jefferson Loftfield
- Edited by: Jane Lawalata
- Music by: Hannis Brown
- Distributed by: Next Page Productions
- Release date: October 18, 2008
- Countries: Nigeria, United States
- Language: English
- Budget: $178,000 (estimated)

Through the Glass is a 2008 American-Nigerian comedy film, written, directed and produced by Stephanie Okereke. The film was nominated for Best Screenplay at the 5th Africa Movie Academy Awards in 2009.

== Premise ==
The film tells the story of Jeffrey (Garrett McKechnie), who finds himself stuck with an unknown baby. He then asks his Nigerian neighbour (Stephanie Okereke) for help as he has to find the mother of the child before his life is completely ruined.

== Cast ==
- Garrett McKechnie as Jeffery
- Stephanie Okereke as Ada
- Christy Williams as Nicole
- Pascal Atuma as Lawyer Robert
- Susy Dodson as Mrs. Lucas
- Dana Hanna as Gina
- Brion Rose as Matt
- Geno Giordan as Donald
- Ranier L. Kenny as Martha
- Erin Connarn as Nanny 2
- Maria Coloma as Nanny 3
- Ponder Davis as Judge
- Matthew Godbey as James

== See also ==
- List of Nigerian films of 2008
