= Omo Elemosho =

2012 Nigerian film

- Directed by: Bayo Tijani
- Written by: Yewande Adekoya
- Produced by: Yewande Adekoya
- Starring: Yewande Adekoya; Yomi Fash Lanso; Muyiwa Ademola; Bimbo Oshin; Toyin Aimakhu
- Edited by: Sola Ayorinde
- Production company: Ednawey Productions Ltd
- Distributed by: Olasco films
- Release date: 2012
- Country: Nigeria
- Language: Yoruba

Omo Elemosho (English: Child of Elemosho) is a 2012 Nigerian film directed by Bayo Tijani and produced by Yewande Adekoya; the producer of the award-winning film Kudi Klepto. Omo Elemosho received 5 nominations at the 10th Africa Movie Academy Awards.

== Cast ==
- Yomi Fash Lanso as Dr. Femi
- Muyiwa Ademola as Goriola
- Bimbo Oshin as Biola
- Toyin Aimakhu as Tinuke
- Ronke Oshodi Oke as Lolade
- Seyi Ashekun as Tosin
- Lanre Hassan as Asake
- Fausat Balogun as Aunty Kofo
- Monsuru Ijayeg as Animasahun
- Olusola Johnson as Tunji
- Olalekan Olatunji as Gbolahan
- Afeez Eniola
- Yewande Adekoya as Ero
- Folashade Olona as Tanwa
