= Aiyedaade =

Ayedaade Ilu Omoluwabi
- LGA
- Interactive map of Ayedaade
- Location in Nigeria
- Coordinates: 7°19′N 4°21′E
- Country: Nigeria
- State: Osun
- Headquarters: Gbongan

Government
  - Local Government Chairman: Toyosi Ayobami Oluwole

Area
  - Total: 1,113 km^{2} (430 sq mi)

Population (2006 census)
  - Total: 150,392
  - Density: 135.1/km^{2} (350.0/sq mi)
- Time zone: UTC+1 (WAT)
- 3-digit postal code prefix: 221
- ISO 3166 code: NG.OS.AD

Ayedaade is a Local Government Area in Osun State, Nigeria. Its headquarters are in Gbongan at the northern part of the area. The coordinates are 7°28′00″N 4°21′00″E.

It has an area of 1,113 km^{2} and a population of 150,392 at the 2006 census. The postal code of the area is 221. Local Government Chairman and Head of the Local Government Council is Toyosi Ayobami Oluwole.

The Ayedaade Constituency is represented by Isaac Adeyemi Taiwo, who is the Deputy Chief Whip (2010 - 2018) in the Osun State House of Assembly.

Ayedaade local government falls under the Irewole federal constituency represented by Ayo Omidiran and Osun West Senatorial District represented by Isiaka Adeleke in the Upper Chambers.

== Aiyedaade South Local Council Development Area (LCDA) ==
Aiyedaade South Local Council Development Area (LCDA) was created out of Aiyedaade council area for administrative convenience, better development planning and to bring government closer to the grassroot. The LCDA is created by the Government of Osun State and is responsible for the funding of the council. The LCDA is headed by a chairman, vice chairman and other executive and legislative branches similar to the federally recognized local councils. The current chairman of the LCDA is Ogunfolaju O. Olusola.

== Climate ==
The climate of the Earth is changing, and it is anticipated that this trend will continue throughout the next century. The amount of greenhouse (heat-trapping) gases released globally and the degree of uncertainty in the Earth's climate's sensitivity to those emissions will be the key determinants of the extent of climate change beyond the next few decades. Global annual average temperature rise might be kept to 2 °C (3.6 °F) or below with considerable reductions in greenhouse gas (GHG) emissions. The increase in annual average world temperatures relative to preindustrial times, however, might reach 5 °C (9.0 °F) or more by the end of this century if significant reductions in these emissions are not made.

=== Geomorphology ===
With a total area of 1,113 square kilometres or 430 square miles, Ayedaade LGA has two distinct seasons: the dry season and the rainy season. The area's average temperature is 29 degrees Celsius or 84 degrees Fahrenheit. Additionally, the Ayedaade local government region has a humidity level of 61 percent and a wind speed of 9 km/h (5.6 mph).

== Notable people ==
- Bolaji Amusan, comic actor and filmmaker
- Patricia Etteh, politician and the first female Speaker of the Nigerian House of Representatives
