= 2 Milly Star =

Nigerian actor and musician (born 2004)

- Born: Ogagbe Oghenechovwe Blessing; November 18, 2004 (age 21); Ughelli, Delta State, Nigeria
- Education: University of Delta
- Occupations: Actor; musician; TikToker
- Years active: 2014–present
- Known for: Acting

Ogagbe Oghenechovwe Blessing (born 18 November 2004), known professionally as 2 Milly Star, is a Nigerian actor, musician and TikToker. He is best known for his role as Musa on Kunle Afolayan’s Nigerian historical thriller October 1.

== Career ==
Blessing made his acting debut in 2014, in the movie October 1. In 2019, he appeared in the drama Three Thieves as Larry. Since then, he has appeared in several movies including The Herbert Macaulay Affair (2019), The Wait (2021), Strangers (2022), and Elesin Ọbá: The King's Horseman (2022).

On 1 August 2025, 2 Milly Star released his five track debut extended play JOY.

== Filmography ==
- October 1 as Musa (2014)
- Three Thieves as Larry (2019)
- The Herbert Macaulay Affair as Fola (2019)
- Inspector K as H4 (2017–2020)
- The Wait as Larry (2021)
- Swallow (2021)
- Love Me as Mike (2021)
- Strangers as Layi (2022)
- Elesin Oba: The King's Horseman as Blessing (2022)
- Bank Alert (2024)

== Discography ==
- JOY EP 2025
