= Clash (2021 film) =

- Directed by: Pascal Atuma
- Produced by: Pascal Atuma
- Starring: Omoni Oboli; Brian Hooks; Stephanie Linus; Pascal Atuma; Michelle Akanbi
- Release date: 2021
- Countries: Nigeria; Canada
- Languages: English; French; Yoruba

Clash is a 2021 a Nigerian movie produced and directed by Pascal Atuma under the American movie streaming company, Netflix. The movie advocates for multi-culturalism and it was co-founded by Telefilm Canada Media Fund (CMF) in order to support their mission for multi-culturalism. The film stars cast across Nigeria and Canada such as Warren Beaty, Ola George, Omoni Oboli, Brian Hooks, Merlisa Langellier, Stephanie Linus, Vivian Williams, and Pascal Atuma

== Synopsis ==
The movie revolves around a young man who had to live with a lie that his uncle is his father. It later became a clash when he realised the truth on the day of his graduation.

== Premiere ==
The movie was supposed to be released on May 8, 2020 but due to COVID 19 it was not released until May 18, 2021 by Netflix.

== Cast ==
- Brian Hooks as Dr. Johnson
- Michelle Akanbi as Ruth
- Omoni Oboli as Nneka
- Stephanie Okereke Linus as Lolo Chinyere
- Naima Sundiata as Ada
- Wendy German as Donna
- Lou Israel as Tilton Williams
- Pascal Atuma as Chief Okereke
