= David Nnaji =

Nigerian actor

- Born: David Ugochukwu Nnaji; July 1985 (age 40); Lagos State
- Education: University of Lagos
- Occupation: Actor

David Nnaji (born July 1985) is a Nigerian actor, notable for his role as Ifeanyi Phillips in the television series Dear Mother.

== Biography ==
Nnaji was born in July 1985 in Lagos State, southwestern region of Nigeria and had all his schooling in the state. Nnaji is the fourth of five children and has two children, Chinualumogu Naetochukwu Nnaji and Adaezeh Munachimso Nnaji. He went on to bag a bachelor's degree in History and Strategic Studies from the University of Lagos.

Upon graduation from the university, Nnaji founded a record label called DUN Entertainment Limited. He interpreted the role of Ifeanyi Phillips in the series Dear Mother which was shown on television for over a decade.

== See also ==
- List of Nigerian film producers
