= Temitope Duker =

Nigerian actor and filmmaker

- Born: Temitope Duker; July 22, 1978 (age 47); Lagos State, Nigeria
- Citizenship: Nigerian
- Occupations: actress; producer; director
- Years active: 1997 – present

Temitope Duker (born 22 July 1978) is a Nigerian filmmaker and radio show host.

== Personal life ==
Duker was born on 22 July 1978, into the Olowogbowo neighborhood of Lagos Island Local Government of Lagos State. Temitope was born into the family of Hon. Ayodele Benjamin, one time Acting chairman of the old Lagos Island and Chairman Lagos Divisional Football Association, who later became a board member of Lagos State Sports Council.

Duker is married to Fidelis Duker, one of Nollywood’s early filmmakers and festival organizers; and they have three children together .

== Career ==
Temitope Duker started her career in the Nollywood industry as a filmmaker in 1997 after working as assistant producer on Nemesis, a project produced by her husband Fidelis and released the same year. Since then she has gone on to produce and work as director for several movies, with her latest being Carwash (2021), a movie that starred Lateef Adedimeji, Dayo Amusa, Eniola Ajao and Jide Kosoko.

In 2003, Duker joined her husband to found the Abuja International Film Festival (AIFF), acting as Festival Coordinator from 2003 to 2019, then acting as Festival Director in 2019.

Currently, Duker sits on the board as an executive director of the Fad Media Group owners of Fad FM 93.1 and Fad360 TV in Calabar and Lagos. Duker also hosts a radio show called Serenade With Boss lady.

== Filmography ==
Year	Title	Role	Notes
1997	Nemesis	Assistant producer	Duker worked as an assistant producer with the producer being her husband, Fidelis Duker and featuring Jenkins Ekpo as an actor.
1997	Not My Will	Assistant producer	The movie starred Segun Arinze
1999	Ibinabo	Assistant producer	The producer/director was Olumide Bola Akindele with Uche Jombo as the lead actor.
1998	Destined To Die	Producer	The movie starred Keppy Bassey Ekpenyong
1998	Night of Vulture	Producer	starred Zack Orji and Larry Coldsweat
1998	Enemy Within	Producer	Starring Charles Okafor
2001	Jesu Mushin	Producer	starring Stephanie Okereke, Zack Orji and Sonny McDons
2020	Twisted	Producer	starring Ngozi Nwosu, Segun Arinze, Kehinde Kujore, Olatayo Amokade aka Ijebu, and Shola AkinTunde aka Lagata
2021	Girls at the Carwash	Producer/director	starring Lateef Adedimeji, Dayo Amusa, Eniola Ajao, and Jide Kosoko
2022	Ife to Koro	Producer/director	starring Lateef Adedimeji, Mide Martins, Babatunde Aderiloye
