= Alakada Reloaded =

Nigerian 2017 comedy film

- Directed by: Toyin Abraham
- Release date: 26 May 2017

Alakada Reloaded is a 2017 Nigerian comedy film by Nigerian actress and filmmaker Toyin Abraham. The film is the third instalment of the Alakada franchise, preceded by Alakada and Alakada 2. It was released in theatres on 26 May 2017 and stars Toyin Abraham, Bolaji Amusan, Gabriel Afolayan, Kemi Lala Akindoju, and a cameo appearance by Odunlade Adekola as himself.

The franchise follows Yetunde, a young girl who, having come from a less-privileged family, makes a habit of lying to people about her financial status. In this film, she finds herself competing in a reality show, much like Big Brother Naija, and her habits of lying are getting harder to hold up amongst her castmates, some of whom are actually well-to-do and the rest who are also pathological liars like her.

Alakada Reloaded was a commercial success in Nigerian cinemas upon its release and is included in the list of highest-grossing Nigerian films, with a domestic gross of up to 70 million naira.
