= Eddy Young =

Nigerian film maker

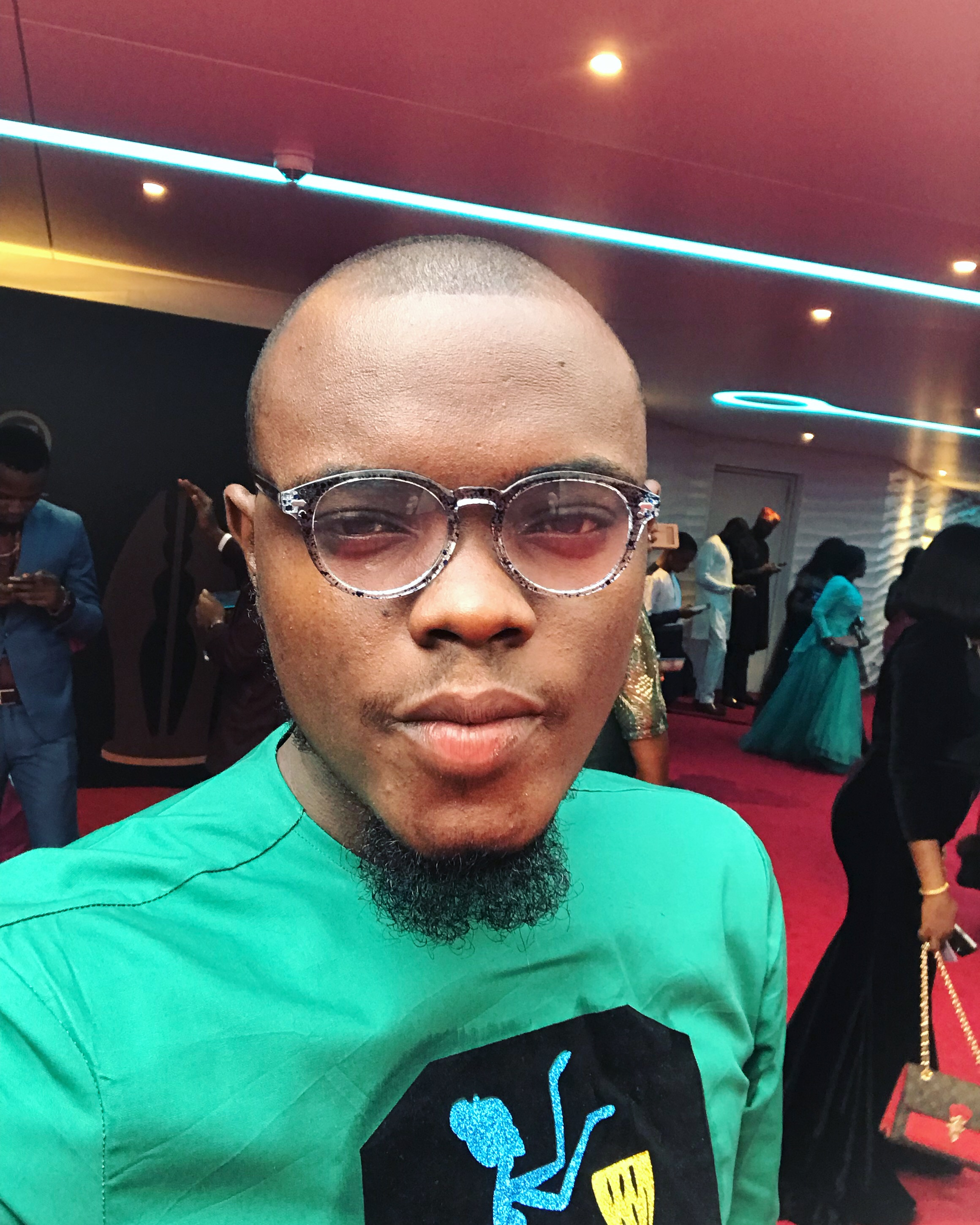
- Born: Edward Osaretinmwen Erhahon; May 17; Benin city, Edo State, Nigeria
- Education: University of Benin
- Occupations: Film Producer and Media Executive.
- Years active: 2011–present
- Notable work: Kasanova

Edward Young (born Edward Osaretinmwen Erhahon) is a Nigerian filmmaker known for his debut production film Kasanova that became a box-office success as the highest grossing Nigerian film in September 2019. He was recognized by the Ooni of Ife Oba Adeyeye Enitan Ogunwusi, Ojaja II, in 2020 for his contributions in the Nollywood sector.

== Life ==
Eddy was born to the family of Mr and Mrs Erhahon in Benin city, Edo state, Nigeria. He attended school in Benin city and received a Bachelor of Science degree in Adult and Non-Formal Education from the University of Benin. His career started as an on-air personality with independent television and Radio Benin and later served in Hitfm Calabar. His major industry break was in January 2019 when he produced Kasanova, which has received reviews from critics and viewers. The film made its debut in Nigerian cinema in September 2019 and debuted on Netflix in June 2020. In the same year, he produced a web series titled The Badchelors, which was premiered on 29 April.

== Filmography ==
- 2020: Old School Lives On (producer)
- 2020: Man Like Jimmy (producer)
- 2020: The Badchelors (web series) (producer)
- 2019: Kasanova (producer)
- 2019: Dejavu (producer)
- 2019: What Happened on 3rd Street (producer)

== See also ==
- List of Nigerian film producers
