= Imported Wives =

Imported Wives is a 2025 Nigerian film, directed by Pascal Atuma. Distributed by Nile Entertainment, the film stars Nancy Isime, Omoni Oboli, Joseph Benjamin, and Funky Mallam.

== Cast ==
- Nancy Isime
- Omoni Oboli
- Joseph Benjamin
- Patience Ozokwor
- Linda Osifo
- Ngozi Nwosu
- Funky Mallam

== Reception ==
The film premiered in Lagos in 2025. The film has received critical acclaim, especially for portraying real-life experiences in Canada's African immigrant population.
