= Bolaji Amusan =

Nigerian comic actor (born 1966)

- Born: Bolaji Amusan; 15 October 1966 (age 59); Gbongan, Western Region, Nigeria (now in Osun State, Nigeria)
- Other name: Mr Latin
- Occupations: comic actor; comedian
- Years active: 1988–present
- Spouse: Ronke Amusan
- Children: 2
- Relatives: Temidayo Enitan (Starboy Temidayo)

Bolaji Amusan (born 15 October 1966), commonly known as Mr Latin, is a Nigerian comic actor, filmmaker, director and producer. Since 2018, he has served as the president of the Theatre Arts and Movie Practitioners Association of Nigeria.

== Early life and career ==
Amusan was born at Gbongan, the headquarters of Aiyedaade Local Government Area in Osun State, southwestern region of Nigeria.

He began acting in 1988, became a comedian in 1991, and acquired the name Mr Latin after he spoke French while acting in the 1992 film 50-50 produced by Akin Ogungbe, who mistook it for Latin.

He has produced over 40 movies, mostly comedies, and is the CEO of Mr. Latin TV and the Mr. Latin Foundation.

Amusan joined the Association of Nigerian Theatre Arts Practitioners, now the Theatre Arts and Movie Practitioners Association of Nigeria, in 1989; after serving in local posts, he was the Governor for Ogun State in 2006–2010, later became director for organization and business, and in 2018 was elected its President.

In 2025, Amusan Bagged a Doctorate Degree in Leadership and Humanity at The America University of Peace and Governance.

== Filmography ==
- 50/50 (1992)
- Ebun Igbeyawo (1996)
- Faworaja (1999)
- Nnkan Olomoba (2000)
- Talo n gbemu (2001)
- Mr. President (Ààrẹ Apàsẹ Wàá) (2004)
- Eegun Mogaji
- Obajobalo
- Òfin mósè (2006) as Gateman
- Ile Itura (2007)
- Baba Insurance (2009),
- Ise onise (2009)
- Baba Gomina
- Aweni Baku
- Emi Airi
- Alakada (2009) as Baba Yetunde
- Alakada 2 (2013) as Baba Yetunde
- Alakada Reloaded (2017) as Baba Yetunde
- The Vendor (2018) as Lasisi
- Pero (2018) as Baba Pero
- Ajebidan (2020) as Mr. Show
- Alimi (2021) as Alimi
- Ejika the Tailor (2021) as Ajiwarin
- Symphony (2022) as Baba Remi
- Diety (2023) as Oloye Osi
- Ijogbon (2023) as Alabi
- Lakatabu (2024)

== See also ==
- List of Nigerian film producers
- List of Yoruba people
