= Segun Ogungbe =

Nigerian actor (born 1970)

Segun Akanni Ogungbe
- Born: March 28, 1970 (age 56); Abeokuta
- Citizenship: Nigeria
- Occupations: Actor; Film producer; Film director; Script writer
- Notable work: Ibi Giga; One Bad Turn; Olokiki Oru: The Midnight Sensation
- Spouse: Atinuke Ogungbe
- Partner: Omowunmi Ajiboye
- Awards: 2021 Movie Icon Award

Segun Akanni Ogungbe is Nigerian actor and film producer. He is known for his lead role in Olokiki Oru, Ibi Giga and One Bad Turn. He is also a recipient of the 2021 Movie Icon Award by City People Magazine.

== Early life and education ==
Ogungbe was born on 28 March 1970 in Abeokuta, Ogun State, to Olasehinde Ogungbe and Amope Ogungbe. He obtained his primary and secondary school certificates in Ibadan, Oyo State. He is a nephew of Nigerian actor, Akin Ogungbe.

== Career ==
Ogungbe began his career at the age of three, where he featured in films by Baba Ogungbe, Ogunde, Baba Sala and Atoka Magazine. In 1996, he started his film company, Segun Ogungbe Films Production and in 2004/2005, he produced his first film, Banke Despirado. He came into the limelight when he produced Ibi Giga.

== Marriage controversy ==
Ogungbe has been widely reported to have married two women, Atinuke Ogungbe and actress Omowumi Ajiboye. However, in 2025, Ajiboye denied the marriage, stating that although they have two children together, they were never married.

== Selected filmography ==
The following is a list of selected films featuring Ogungbe.

S/N	Title	Role	Year
1.	Ibi Giga	Producer/lead actor	
2.	Akoto Olokada	D. Man	2009
3.	Owo Ago	Spirit	2017
4.	Olokiki Oru: The Midnight Sensation	Omo Leyin Akala	2019
5.	One Bad Turn	Tambourinmes Gaeman	2022
