= Afro Candy =

Nigerian film actress and director (born 1971)

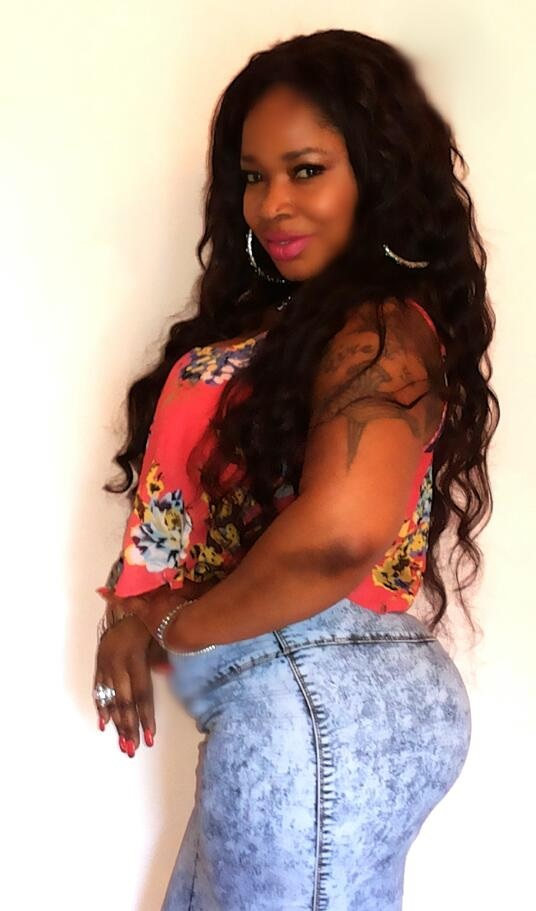
- Born: Judith Chichi Okpara; 12 July 1971 (age 54); Umuduruebo, Imo, Nigeria
- Education: Office administration; business management
- Occupations: Actress; director; model; producer; singer; songwriter
- Notable work: Dwelling in Darkness and Sorrow
- Website: https://afrocanetwork.com/

Judith Chichi Okpara // (born 12 July 1971), better known as Afro Candy // (also spelled Afrocandy), is a Nigerian film actress, director, producer, singer-songwriter, model, and pornographic actress. She is the founder and CEO of Invisible Twins Productions LLC.

== Early life ==
Afro Candy was born in Umuduruebo Ugiri-ike, Ikeduru, a LGA in Imo State. As a teenager in high school, she was drawn to acting but lost interest after entering college.

== Education ==
She gained an associate degree in office administration and a BSc degree in business management. In addition, she trained as a fireguard/security officer.

== Career ==
She started answering the name Afro Candy when she got to the United States;before then she was called Eye-Candy. She released her debut single "Somebody Help Me" in 2009, she released her 8-track debut studio album in 2010 and dropped her second album in 2012. Afrocandy is also a porn star and has produced and acted in a few porn films, including Queen of Zamunda.

Discovered by modelling agency King George Models, she was encouraged to pursue acting. She began her career in modelling and appeared in commercials for companies such as Coca-Cola, Nixoderm, and Liberia GSM. She ventured into television, where she played mainly minor roles. In 2004, she made her major film debut as Susan in the Obi Obinali-directed film Dangerous Sisters. Her other roles include Nneoma, a village girl in End of the game, and Jezebel in Dwelling in Darkness and Sorrow.

== Personal life ==
In 2005, she joined her husband Bolton Elumelu Mazagwu in the United States with whom she had two children. After 2 years of living there together, the couple separated in 2007. She lives in the United States with her 2 daughters. Mazagwu has also starred in films such as Destructive Instinct, How Did I Get Here, Ordeal in Paradise, and The Goose That Lays The Golden Eggs and has played small roles in various Hollywood movies. As a musical artist, her first single "Somebody Help Me" was released in 2009 followed by her debut studio album which produced the popular hit "Ikebe Na Moni". Also in 2011, she released the single "Voodoo-Juju Woman".

Besides acting and singing, Mazagwu works as a practising medical billing and coding specialist. she alleged that Nollywood was the cause of death for Ada Ameh.

== Filmography ==
- Dwelling in Darkness and Sorrow
- Dangerous Sisters (2004) as Susan
- Standing Alone (2004) as Onome
- Douglas My Love (2004) as Kerry
- The Real Player
- End of the Game (2004)
- Between Love
- Heaven Must Shake
- My Experience
- Ghetto Crime
- Beyond Green Pastures
- Destructive Instinct
- Queen of Zamunda

== See also ==
- List of Nigerian film producers
