= Strangers (2022 film) =

2022 Nigerian drama film

- Directed by: Biodun Stephen
- Written by: Anthony Eloka
- Produced by: Banji Adesanmi
- Starring: Lateef Adedimeji; Bimbo Oshin; Bolaji Ogunmola; Debbie Felix
- Release dates: 29 April 2022 (Lagos, Nigeria)
- Country: Nigeria
- Language: English

Strangers is a 2022 Nigerian drama film written by Anthony Eloka, produced by Banji Adesanmi and directed by Biodun Stephen. The film won the Gold Award for Directing at the International Independent Film Awards held in Los Angeles. It stars Lateef Adedimeji, Bimbo Oshin, Bolaji Ogunmola and Debbie Felix.

== Synopsis ==
The film follows a young traditional boy who is unbothered by civilisation but has to deal with a life-threatening disease. His situation takes an unexpected turn when strangers enter his life.

== Cast ==
- Lateef Adedimeji
- Bimbo Oshin
- Bolaji Ogunmola
- Debbie Felix
- Femi Adebayo
- 2 Milly Star
- Ndamo Damarise
- Namisi Govin Emma
- Chris Iheuwa
- Jide Kosoko
- Bimbo Akintola
- Myde Glover
- Nonso Odogwu

== Premiere ==
The film was screened for critics and crew at Genesis Cinemas, Maryland Mall, Lagos, on 21 April 2022, ahead of its theatrical release on 29 April 2022.
