= Oliver Mbamara =

Nigerian filmmaker, actor, writer and lawyer

Oliver O. Mbamara
- Citizenship: Nigerian
- Education: University of Lagos
- Occupations: Filmmaker, Actor, Writer, Poet, and Lawyer
- Notable work: Slave Warrior; This America; The Return of the Spade; On The Run Again; Cultures TV Series; Spade: The Last Assignment
- Website: https://olivermbamara.com

Oliver O. Mbamara is a Nigerian filmmaker, actor, writer, poet, and lawyer.

== Career ==
After graduating in Law from the University of Lagos and Nigerian Law School, he practiced law in Nigeria while simultaneously engaging in writing scripts and poetic pieces in which he also performed and while touring around Nigeria with a theater troupe called Prime Circle. He later moved to the United States where he passed the New York State bar examination and was subsequently admitted to practice as an attorney. He has been serving as an administrative law judge with the State of New York for the past two decades, beginning in 2000.

Aside from his professional training as a lawyer, Mbamara is a published writer, poet, publisher, editor, actor, filmmaker, director, and more. He continues to simultaneously make an impact in these various fields. Mbamara is an international freelance writer as well as a columnist with several national, international and regional news magazines news journals, newspapers, and online magazines. His audience is spread around the world and cuts across genres, tribes, races, gender, and profession. Mbamara's articles, poems, and editorials are regularly featured in newspapers, magazines, and websites around the world. He has published numerous books including: Gates of Tangled Leaves, An Afterlife Experience, 2024, African Tales Under The Moonlight, 2020, Why Are We Here? 2004, Flame of Love, The Unrestricted, 2004, Flame of Love, The Spark of God, 2002, Love Poems and Quotes, 2003, Poems of Life, 2nd Edition, 2002, Poems of Life, 2001.

In 2001, a few years after arriving in the United States, Mbamara launched his first book Poems of Life and played the lead-actor role in an off-Broadway dance drama, Prof. Chudis' Prisoner of the Kalakiri. In 2003, Mbamara directed and played the lead in the stage recreation of Zulu Sofola's Wedlock of the Gods, in New York. Mbamara has since then written, directed and produced several feature films: This America, the groundbreaking Nollywood film in diaspora adapted from his novel about the conflicts of an African immigrant in America. Slave Warrior, an African historical action thriller that tells the story of the slave trade from the African perspective. Spade: The Last Assignment, which addresses the issue of human and artifact trafficking from Africa to the Europe and America. On The Run Again, the sequel to This America. The Return of Spade, the second instalment in his Spade Movie Series. His latest feature film Adopted, is in post production and is due for release soon. Mbamara has just completed the screenplay adaptation of his new novel Gates of Tangled Leaves, and is presently working on another epic novel, titled Ways of Our Ancestors, A Moonlight Tale, which looks at life, governance, and co-existence in a pre-colonial African community in place known today as south-eastern Nigeria.

Leadership

Mbamara is the current president of the Nollywood Producers Guild USA, an association of film producers who aim to represent, promote, and protect the interests of Nollywood (Nigerian/African) producers and participants in African film, television, and entertainment media in North America while sharing African culture and creative works.

=== Television production ===
Mbamara has also delved into television production and created, wrote, and directed Cultures. Cultures aims at tolerance amongst differing cultures using humor. In it, an African chief sent from Africa by his kinsmen to bring a wife to their son Ozobio who has stayed too long in America without returning home, arrives America to find out that Ozobio is engaged to an American woman. The chief's persistence leads to a conflict of cultures with the American woman and ultimately to Ozobio's dilemma. Mbamara has now adapted the production to a webisodes billed to run as a weekly comedy drama series on his Youtube Channel under the title Zebrudaya in America (The Chronicles of Ozobio) featuring Nigeria and Africa's television legendary veteran comedian Chief Chika Okpala (MON) aka, Chief Zebrudaya Okorigwe Nwogbo, alias 4:30. The soundtrack of Culture was recorded and produced by Aguike, alias Allah-bama.

Awards and Recognition

Mbamara has received several awards in recognition of his achievements in various fields including: The Nigeria Centenary Achievement Award (NCAA) USA (2014). The Albert Nelson Marquis Lifetime Achievement Award by the Board of MARQUIS WHO’S WHO (2017)." The 2015 LANFA Legendary Movie Achievement Award USA. The 2013 Nigerian Sports & Cultural Award for “Contributions to the Nigerian Movie Industry.” The 2012 GRIOTS Film Festival Recognition For “Dedication & Commitment to African Cinema.” The 2012 Nations of Pan Africa Best Movie Director Award. The 2012 NAFCA Best Cinematography Award. The 2011 Nollywood USA “Legendary Achievement Award.” The 2011 Nigerian Promoters Association (USA) “Best Movie Producer of the Year Award.” The 2008 Afro Heritage Immigrant Award. The 2008 Afro-Hollywood USA Legendary Award. The 2002 – International Poet of Merit Award, among others.

== Filmography ==
- Little America (2020) as Projectionist
- Slave Warrior (2012) as Ike
- This America (2005) as Oziobo
- The Return of the Spade (2011) as Spade
- Spade: The Last Assignment (2008)
- On the Run Again (2010 sequel to This America)

== See also ==
- List of Nigerian film producers
