= Kasanova =

2019 Nigerian romantic comedy film

- Directed by: Oluseyi Asurf
- Written by: Tomi Adesina; Ugochukwu Isreal; Oluseyi Asurf
- Produced by: Eddy Young
- Starring: Wale Ojo; Iretiola Doyle; Toyin Abraham
- Cinematography: Kagho Idhebor
- Production company: Fojo Media
- Release date: 13 September 2019
- Running time: 115 minutes
- Country: Nigeria
- Language: English

Kasanova is a 2019 Nigerian romantic comedy film directed by Oluseyi Asurf and produced by Eddy Young with Faith Ojo as its Executive Producer. The film was primarily shot in Lagos, Nigeria. It stars Wale Ojo, Iretiola Doyle and Toyin Abraham in the lead roles. The film was premiered at the Filmhouse Cinema on 11 September 2019. The film had its theatrical release on 13 September 2019 and opened to highly positive reviews. The film became a box office success and was the highest grossing Nigerian film in September 2019. The soundtrack “Don’t Let Go” was performed by British-Nigerian artist Mr DiL

== Synopsis ==
Femi (Wale Ojo), a single dad falls in love with Jessica (Iri Doyle), who is a single mother. The couple fall in love through their children, and it ensures there is a battle for love, family and friendship. In fact, Jessica is the music teacher of Femi's son Jason (Alvin Abayomi) and it causes a conflict of interest between the father and son.

== Cast ==
- Wale Ojo as Femi
- Iretiola Doyle as Jessica
- Alvin Abayomi as Jason (Femi's son)
- Toyin Abraham as Bisola
- Ruby Akubueze as Ini Obong
- Chimezie Imo as Tolu
- Ayo Makun as Dr. Robinson
- Binta Ayo Mogaji as Mama
- Helen Paul as lecturer
- Tomiwa Tegbe as Dozie
- Odunlade Adekola as Soji
- Taiwo Adeyemi as Kunle
- Esosa Erhabor as Seun Opera
- Bayray McNwizu as Lady Nurse

== Box office ==
The film collected ₦4.9 million in the opening weekend and grossed a sum of ₦7.9 million in the opening week since its release.
