= Gbongan =

Town in Osun State, Nigeria

Gbongan Olufi Arokodeja
- Town
- Motto(s): peace and unity
- Location in Nigeria
- Coordinates: 7°28′N 4°21′E
- Country: Nigeria
- State: Osun State
- LGA: Aiyedaade

Government
  - Oba: Olufi of Gbongan

Population (1991 census)
  - Total: 69,931
- Time zone: UTC+1 (WAT)

Gbongan is a large town in Osun State, Nigeria. It is the headquarters of the Aiyedaade Local Government Area.

The town has an official Post Office. Gbongan was founded by Olufioye (a prince of old Oyo - one of the surviving sons of Alaafin Abiodun Adegoriolu).

== The History of Gbongan ==
Abiodun Adegoriolu the Alaafin of Oyo, who reigned between C1750 - 1789 was the father of Olufioye - Olufi is an abbreviation of Olufioye.

Olufioye migrated from Oyo with a large followers consequent upon the unrest that attended the death of Alaafin Abiodun in 1789. One tradition states that Olufi contested the throne of Oyo and lost. He then had to leave Oyo as tradition demanded. Another associates the migration of Olufi from Oyo with the general unrest that characterised the politics in Oyo after the demise of Alaafin Abiodun. This made Oyo metropolis not safe for peaceful existence, hence many citizens of Oyo followed Olufi as he migrated from Oyo.

It is relevant here to stress that Olufi probably left Oyo after 1789. He took Igbori route. His entourage stayed there for some time. They then moved to Soungbe before they finally settled in Gbongan Ile.

All these places are mentioned in the Oriki Olufi, the important things that happened to Olufi and his entourage are also recited in the Oriki. The Olufi carried along from Oyo a beaded crown which made his followers recognise him not only as an Oyo prince but as an Oba in his own right.

The unrest that precipitated the fall of Old Oyo empire also affected the stability of many towns in the savannah region of the empire. There emerged soldiers of fortune who started to carve for themselves areas of jurisdiction. They had to fight their weak neighbours to establish their own domains, and in order to survive dis-establish Oyo towns. They, the soldiers of fortune, made it possible for the Fulani to penetrate and to destroy many Oyo towns.

The resultant effect was the drift in population from the savannah region of the old Oyo empire to the forested region of the south, where the horses of the marauders could not easily penetrate. This was how many Oyo towns were either destroyed or deserted and many moved towards Ife forest.

Many settled with the Olufi in Gbongan and others in Origbo. Those who settled among the people of Ife later founded Modakeke.

The fall of Owu in 1821 made many people from Owu to settle in Gbongan. Some people chose to settle in Gbongan from their Origbo base. Gbongan, therefore, started to grow as a result of influx of people from many quarters.

The prevailing peace in Gbongan was however not to last long. There was a fresh wave of marauding activities in places that were regarded as safe. In C1823, after the Fulani defeat of Afonja in Ilorin, Muslim marauders from llorin and Iwo attacked Gbongan Ile, Ikire Ile and Ipetumodu. The towns were deserted and the people sought refuge in Ile-Ife.

=== New Gbongan ===
In about C1825, the people of Gbongan decided to rebuild Gbongan, but the people chose a new site rather than the old site which was at the fringe of the savannah. A site that was in the heart of the forest was, therefore, chosen. This is why at the present location, we have such locations as Owo Ope, Oke Egan, Oke Apo and Oke Apata. There is also the network of streams like Oyunlola, Akinjole, Alaanu and Oleyo which serve as sources of water supply to the town.

The present Gbongan could, therefore be said to be founded around C1825, at a time when there was a renewed influx of people from the crumbling Oyo empire. The fact that Gbongan was headed by an Oba attracted many people to settle there, and the fact that the town had moved to a truly forested region made people to feel secure. By the middle of the 19th century, Gbongan had become one of the biggest towns in this region.

=== Olufi Became A Baale ===
Ibadan imperial drive to Ijesa and Ekiti countries from 1850s affected Gbongan in a number of ways. Gbongan was not conquered by Ibadan. Gbongan was only invited as a junior ally to help in the prosecution of Ibadan wars. This was how Gbongan was involved, and took active parts in Ijesa, Ekiti, Akoko campaigns to the seventeen year of Ekiti Parapo war. Gbongan fought as an ally of Ibadan in the Modakeke war of 1881-86, and this was why almost all Modakeke moved en-masse to settle in Gbongan on March 27, 1909 before Ode Omu was founded in 1910 for those Modakeke who chose to settle in a separate town.

The implication of this was that the history of Gbongan during the period of Ibadan imperial drive was ultimately tied with that of Ibadan who had a Baale as ruler of Ibadan. In effect, the rulers of those towns which were junior partners of Ibadan were regarded as Baale. This was not peculiar to Gbongan town. Ikire, Apomu, and Ipetumodu were so treated. Olufi therefore resorted to wearing his crown annually during the Orisa Akirerewaye Festival.

== Climate ==
The climate of Gbongan is a tropical savanna . Throughout the year, temperatures normally fall between 25 °C (76 °F) and 29 °C (84 °F), but they can occasionally fall as low as 17 °C (63 °F) or climb as high as 39 °C (102 °F). There are 206 rainy days on the 1 mm (0.04 inches) threshold per year, with an average of 1333 mm (52.5 inches) of precipitation. Gbongan receives 3338 hours of sunshine on average throughout the year, with daylight hours ranging from 11 hours 40 minutes to 12 hours.

== Gbongan Obas ==
It needs to be stressed that traditions point to Olufioye as the Oba who reigned at Gbongan Ile. Fagbola became the first ruler in the present-day Gbongan.

The following dates relate to the reigning periods of Olufi Obas in present Gbongan.

Adetoyese Oyeniyi (1998–present)

Solomon Oyewole Babayemi (1989 - 1998)

Jacob Adeoye (1973 - 1988)

Oyeniyi Makanju (1948 - 1971)

Asabi (1926 - 1948)

Ajagbogbo (1913 - 1924)

Sooko (1860 - 1913)

Olujide (1835 - 1859)

Olatoye Fagbola (1825 - 1835)
