= Office administration =

Activities related to office maintenance

Office administration (shortened as Office AD and abbreviated as OA) is a set of day-to-day activities or tasks that are related to the maintenance of an office building, financial planning, record keeping and billing, personal development, physical distribution and logistics, within an organization. An employee that undertakes these activities is commonly called an office administrator or office manager, and plays a key role in any organisations infrastructure, regardless of the scale. Many administrative positions require proficiency in office software and tools, including the Microsoft Office Suite and Google Workspace, as well as more specialised systems such as facility management software (e.g. Facility Anywhere, Archibus), employee rostering systems, and Accounting software (e.g. MYOB, Xero).

== Administration Manager ==
An office administrator has the responsibility of ensuring that the administrative activities within an organization run efficiently by providing structure to other employees within an organization. These activities can range from being responsible for the management of human resources, budgets and records, to undertaking the role of supervising other employees. These responsibilities can vary depending on the employer and level of education.

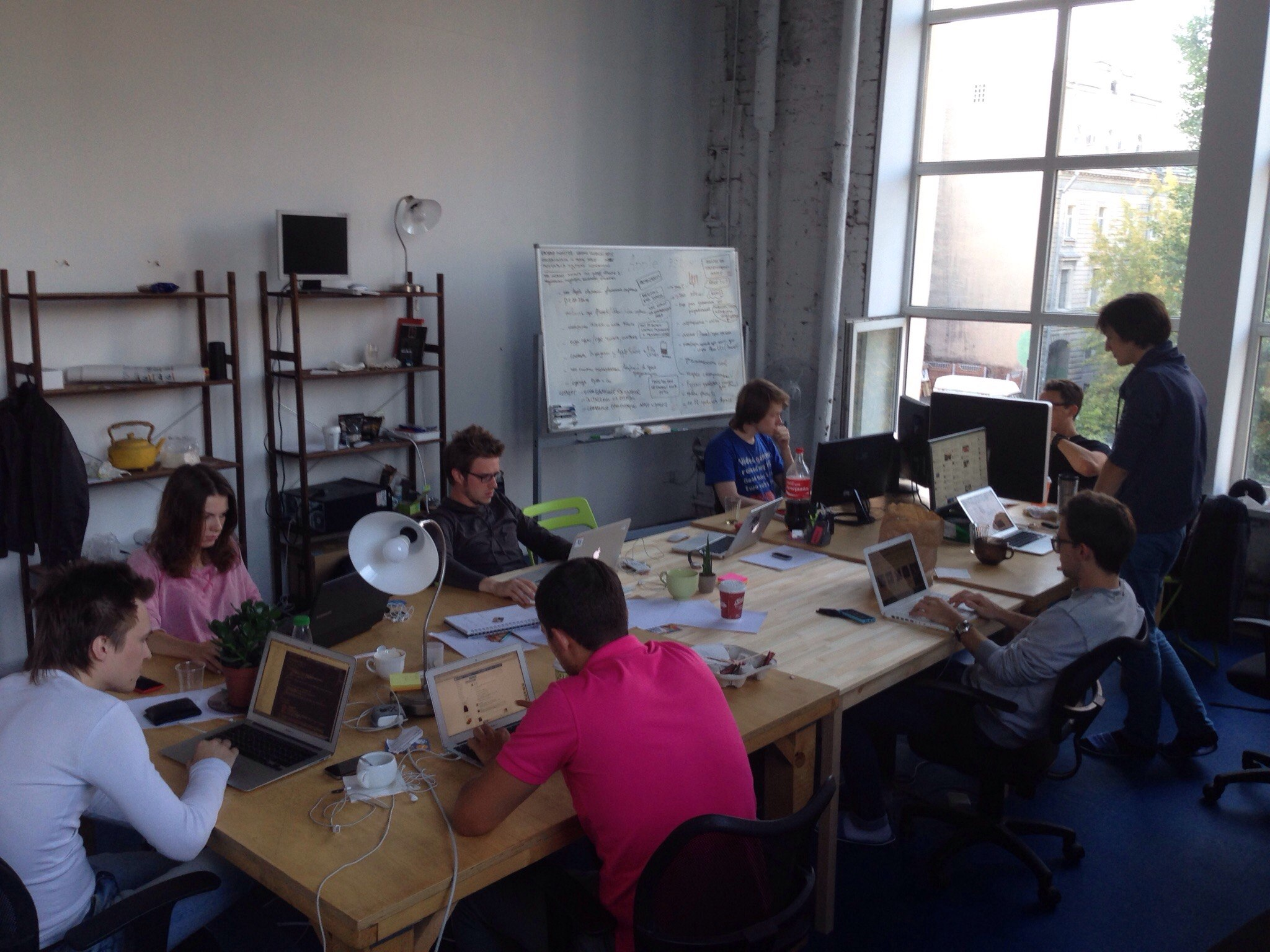
Team of office administrators and managers undertaking administrative tasks

=== Skill Set ===
The importance of an office administrator to an organization is substantial due to the duties that they are entrusted with; therefore, specialized training is required in order for the employee to work efficiently and productively, these being;

- Payroll training that involves the responsibility in ensuring that all employees receive their pay slips on time.
- Having good communication skills in order to coordinate with other employees around the organization.
- The ability to supervise support workers
- The ability to adapt to changing environments and new technologies that could be implemented e.g. new software installation.
- Showing good initiative
- The ability to work under pressure when given a task that is of vital importance to the organization.

=== Roles ===
There are an extensive range of roles that can be associated with an office administrator. Organizations often advertise administrative assistant vacancies targeted at students that are currently studying or who have left secondary school or college. This gives the employee the opportunity to gain experience or build a career through full-time work or an internship over the course of a summer break.

Receptionists play a key role in the organization's management, as they are entrusted with arranging and greeting clients, suppliers and visitors directly via emails, phone calls or direct mail. The employee undertaking the role of a receptionist must show good organisational, communication and customer service skills in order to ensure efficiency. The receptionist should be aware of scammers who try to obtain the inner information of an office or medical practice to abuse or exploit it. Other responsibilities that a receptionist is entrusted with are:

- Ensuring that outgoing and incoming mail is allocated to the right department within the organisation
- Organising and assisting fellow employees with meetings, conferences and direct telephone calls when required
- Communicating with members of the public when an inquiry is made
- Managing and maintaining the filing system that has been implemented into the organisation, e.g. information systems
- Clerical duties that involve the ordering of equipment, office supplies and other inventory that is required

Personal Assistants are commonly associated with assisting an office manager to maintain the efficiency of their day-to-day work; this is through providing secretarial support and assistance. Becoming a personal assistant requires the employee to have experience in previous administrative jobs, which entails the use of computers and information systems. Like any other role that is related to an office administrator, the job title of personal assistant requires the employee to be organized, show professionalism and have an ability to work under pressure when given a task of vital importance. The duties that a personal assistant must carry out each day are the following:

- Inputting, filing and managing the data that is stored within the organization's office system
- Ensuring that all contact from third-party individuals is processed through them
- Arranging transportation and meetings that are of importance to the office manager
- Ensuring that documents, reports and presentations are set up prior to any meetings
- Processing emails and letters that are received in correspondence to the office manager

== Office Manager ==
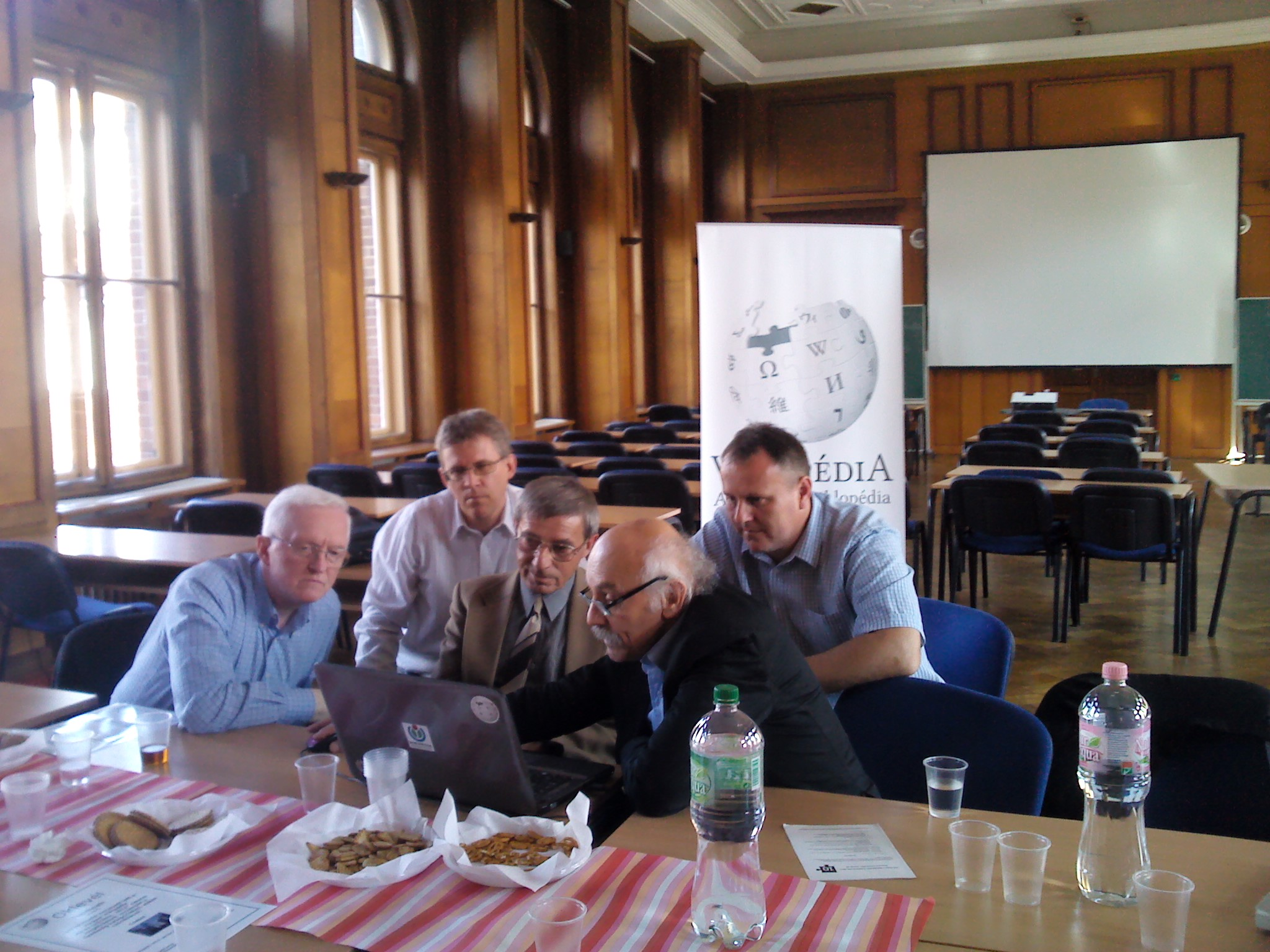
Office manager supervising and teaching their fellow employees

An office manager has the responsibility of ensuring that an organization's office duties are completed efficiently and effectively, while also supervising other staff members. The role of an office manager is more demanding than other administrative positions, including skills and qualifications such as strong administrative experience, competency in human resources, reporting skills, delegation, management processes and the ability to communicate with other members of the organization.

=== Duties ===
The duties of an office manager include:

- Organize the office's operations and procedures by undertaking several administrative tasks, for example designing and implementing new filing systems
- Assigning tasks to employees and following up on their progress
- Recruiting, selecting and training new employees
- Developing employees through coaching and counseling
- Producing annual budgets
- Professional development, for example by attending external training sessions
