= Sikiru Adesina =

- Born: 1971
- Died: 8 February 2016 (aged 44–45); Kaduna
- Other names: Arakangudu
- Citizenship: Nigerian
- Occupations: Actor; Director; Producer
- Known for: Role as Herbalist, Armed Robber, Occultist in Films
- Notable work: Idunnu Mi

Sikiru Adesina (1971 – February 8, 2016), popularly known as Arakangudu, was a Nigerian film actor, director and producer. He was best known for taking up roles as either a herbalist, armed robber or occultist in films. On February 8, 2016, he died at his residence in Kaduna, Northern Nigeria.

== Filmography ==
- Temi Ni, Tie Ko (2004)
- Agbede Ogun (2005)
- Idunnu Mi (2007)
- Ilu Gangan (2009)
- Ogbologbo (2003)
- Iya Oju Ogun (2007)
- Ere Agbere (2005)
- Agba Osugbo
- Aje Olokun
- Iya Oko Bournvita
- Igba Owuro (2005)
- Ayaba Oosa
- Ajana oro
- Fijabi
- Oju Odaran Re
- "Basira Badia"
- Ogunmola bashorun ibadan”

== See also ==
- List of Nigerian film producers
