= Yewande Adekoya =

Nigerian actress (born 1983)

Yewande Adekoya Abiodun
- Born: January 20, 1983 (age 43); Lagos State, Nigeria
- Citizenship: Nigerian
- Education: Babcock University
- Occupations: actress; filmmaker; film producer; director
- Years active: 2002–present
- Notable work: Omo Elemosho
- Children: 2
- Awards: Yoruba Movie Academy awards ' Most promising act', City People Movie awards 'Best Movie of the year'

Yewande Adekoya (born 20 January 1983) is a Nigerian actress, filmmaker.

== Early life and education ==
Yewande was born in Lagos State but hails from Ososa-Ijebu in Ogun State southwestern Nigeria. She attended Bright star nursery and primary school, before proceeding for her secondary education at Bright Star Comprehensive High School. She obtained a Bachelor of Arts (B.A) degree in Mass communications from Babcock University. Yewande Adekoya married and had children. In April 2022, Yewande announced that her marriage had ended. She said she had been experiencing emotional abuse for 14 years.

== Career ==
Yewande Adekoya began acting in 2002 with Alphabash Music And Theatre Group. She scripted and produced her first content in 2006 titled "Life Secret". She has produced, directed and featured in several Nigerian films such as Omo Elemosho, a 2012 film that featured Bimbo Oshin, Muyiwa Ademola and Yomi Fash-Lanso. The film also received 5 nominations at the 10th Africa Movie Academy Awards. She also got nominated for "best new actress" in the Yoruba category at 2014 City People Entertainment Awards. In the same year, her role in Kudi Klepto got her best actress in a leading role nomination at 2014 Best of Nollywood Awards. In December 2014, Adekoya won the "most promising act" award at Yoruba Movie Academy Awards. Her film Kurukuru earned her the best actress award at the 2016 ACIA ceremony. In 2017, her film, Iyawo Adedigba, got the award for "best movie of the year" at the 2017 City People Movie Awards.

=== Selected filmography ===
- Life Secrets 1 (2006)
- Life Secrets 2 (2007)
- Igbo Dudu (2009)
- Omo Elemosho (2012) as Ero
- Kudi Klepto (2013)
- Emere (2014)
- Kurukuru (2015)
- The Sacrifice (2016)
- Tamara (2016)
- Ayanmo (2016)
- Ota Ile (2016)
- Once Upon a Time (2016)
- Double Trouble (2017) as Turayo
- Iyawo Adedigba (2017)
- Fadaka (2018)
- Belladonna (2018)
- Odun Ibole (2018)
- Ewatomi (2018)
- Black Veil (2019) as Jadesola
- Omo Aniibire (2019)
- The Girl King (2019) as Fadeke
- Ife Aimo (2019) as Lola
- Ajoji (2020) as Kemi
- Oba Esan (2020)
- Apoti Oke (2020)
- The Griot (2021) as Sunbo
- Bantale (2022) as Bantale
- Iwa Eda (2022) as Faderera
- Oko Mi (2022)
- Romoke's Demon (2023)

=== Awards ===
2014 : Best New alActress - City People Entertainment Awards

2014:Yoruba Movies Academy Award for Most Promising Actress - Yorùbá Movie Academy Awards

2014: Most Promising Act Award at Yoruba Heritage Awards, United States

2016 - Best Actress in Leading Role- ACIA

== See also ==
- List of Nigerian film producers
- List of Yoruba people
