= Chike Nwoffiah =

Nigerian actor and director

- Born: Chike Nwoffiah; 22 July 1965 (age 61); Nigeria
- Education: University of Lagos Columbia University Graduate School of Business
- Occupation: Actor

Chike C. Nwoffiah (born 22 July 1965 in Nigeria) is a Nigerian filmmaker and arts consultant. He was listed as one of the "Top Ten Most Influential African Americans" in the San Francisco Bay Area by City Flight Magazine in 2000.

== Education and career ==
Nwoffiah was educated at Government College, Umuahia, and the University of Lagos, before moving to the United States to study at the Columbia University Graduate School of Business (INM) and the Hollywood Film Institute.

He was the president of the Rhesus Media Group and executive director of the Oriki Theater, both in California. He was an adjunct faculty member at Menlo College, California. He was the Principal Partner in C3 Media, Abuja, Nigeria. He was the director of the Silicon Valley African Film Festival.

== Filmography ==
- 2000: Growing Black in America
- 2001: Jamaica - Spirit of Enterprise
- 2002: Tantu
- 2003: A Jewel in History
- 2004: A Killing in Choctaw
- 2005: Every Drop Counts
- 2006: Bridges
- 2007: Wake Up Africa
- 2009: A Prayer for the Inauguration
- 2009: Sabar - life is a dance!

== See also ==
- List of Nigerian film producers
