= Bimbo Oshin =

Nigerian actress (born 1971)

- Born: Abimbola Oshin; 24 July 1971 (age 55); Ondo State, Nigeria
- Citizenship: Nigeria
- Education: Philosophy, University of Lagos
- Alma mater: University of Lagos
- Occupation: Actress
- Years active: 1996-present
- Notable work: Omo Elemosho

Abimbola Oshin (born 24 July 1971) is an actress, writer, producer and businesswoman from Nigeria.

== Early life and education ==
Oshin was born on 24 July 1971 in Ondo State, southwestern Nigeria. She is one of Pa Olasanmi Theophilus Oshin's eight children, the second to last. Oshin attended the University of Lagos where she obtained a Bachelor of Arts (B.A.) degree in Philosophy. Oshin commenced her acting career in 1996 but rose to recognition after starring in a 2012 Yoruba film titled Omo Elemosho.

Oshin grew up in Ondo State where she attended her primary school education at Saint Anne's Primary School. Later, she went to Staff Primary School in Ile Ifẹ, Osun State. For her secondary education, she attended Girls Academy, Sandgrouse in Lagos State. Oshin then went for higher education at the University of Lagos, where she earned a Bachelor of Arts (B.A) degree in Philosophy.

== Career ==
Oshin's love for acting began at a tender age. She had been doing some minor drama in the house with her elder sibling in which they recorded their pseudo videos. But her career in acting started initially during her undergraduate days at the University of Lagos. Her friend's sister introduced her to a group called Ara Osan. She told her she had joined, and she should follow her too. Oshin agreed, joined the group (Ara Osan) in 1996 and started going for rehearsals. Ara Osan theatre group is a group owned by Rasaq Ajao and she spent four years under her boss. Although she started a movie career with English soap operas, she is also in the Yoruba movie industry and is doing well. The first movie that was released which made her popular was titled Akobi in 1997.

== Selected filmography ==
- Eji Owuro (2003)
- Civil War (2003)
- Omo Oku Oron (2004) as Salewa
- Ota (2007)
- Igi ola mi (2008) as Laide
- Omo Elemosho (2012) as Biola
- Kakanfo (2020) as Yeye
- The New Patriots (2020) as Princess Gladys Olubo
- May 29 (film) as Mummy Mayowa
- Abebi (2021) as Bolade
- Alimi (2021) as Ronke
- Strangers (2022) as Toyin
- A Bag of Trouble (2023)

== Award and recognitions ==
In 2016, she was honoured with an Icon Category Award at the 2016 Afro-Heritage Broadcasting and Entertainment and Awards.

Year	Award ceremony	Prize	Result	Ref
2014	Yoruba Movies Academy Awards	Best Actress in a Leading Role	Nominated	
2014	City People Entertainment Awards	Best Actress of the Year (Yoruba)	Nominated	
2015	ZAFAA African Film Academy Awards	Best Female Indigenous Actor	Nominated	

== See also ==
- List of Nigerian film producers
