= Fausat Balogun =

Nigerian actress (born 1959)

- Born: Fausat Balogun; 13 February 1959 (age 67); Ifelodun, Kwara State, Nigeria
- Other names: Madam Saje Mama ibe
- Occupation: Film actress
- Years active: 1975–present
- Spouse: Rafiu Balogun
- Children: 2

Fausat Balogun (also known as Madam Saje, born 13 February 1959) is a Nigerian actress who stars majorly in Yoruba movies. She starred as Mama Saje in a 1990 television series titled Erin Kee Kee. Fausat has starred in over 80 movies.

Balogun is married to the actor Rafiu Balogun. He was her boss before they married. She hails from Oke Ode Ifelodun Local Government Area, Kwara State. By the time she was famous, her children were adults. Her eldest son is a director, and her youngest daughter is an actress.

== Selected filmography ==
- Oyelaja
- Owo Onibara
- Okan Mi
- Akebaje
- Ladigbolu
- Morenike
- Oko Mama E
- Tanimola
- Nkan Okunkun
- Adufe
- Leyin Akponle
- Laba Laba
- Itelorun
- Omo Elemosho (2012) as Aunty Kofo
- Iyawo Ojokan
- Ife Kobami
- Gbogbo Lomo
- Asepamo
- Eto Obinrin
- Iyawo Elenu Razor
- Kokoro Ate
- Omoge Elepa
- Olaitan Anikura
- Oju Elegba
- Langbodo
- Ologo Nla
- Abgara Obinrin
- Eepo
- Moriyeba
- Orisirisi (Kose Gbo)
- Serekode
- Ojo Ikunle
- Alase Aye (2006)
- Imported Lomo
- Adun Ale
- Ileri Oluwa
- Ogbun Aye
- Omo Pupa (2008)
- Òmìn (2008) as Mama Adesina
- O Ti Poju
- Olowo Laye Mo
- Irenimoyan
- Alaimore
- Olasunkanmi
- Salawa
- Adebimpe omo oba
- Alaroka
- Oro itan
- Ebi Dapo
- Aromire
- Awele
- Oro idile
- Ogbon

== Recognitions ==
During the 2016 edition of the City People Entertainment Awards, she was bestowed a Special Recognition Award for her "remarkable contributions to the growth of the movie industry in Nigeria".

== See also ==
- List of Nigerian actors
