= Mayowa Oluyeba =

Nigerian film director

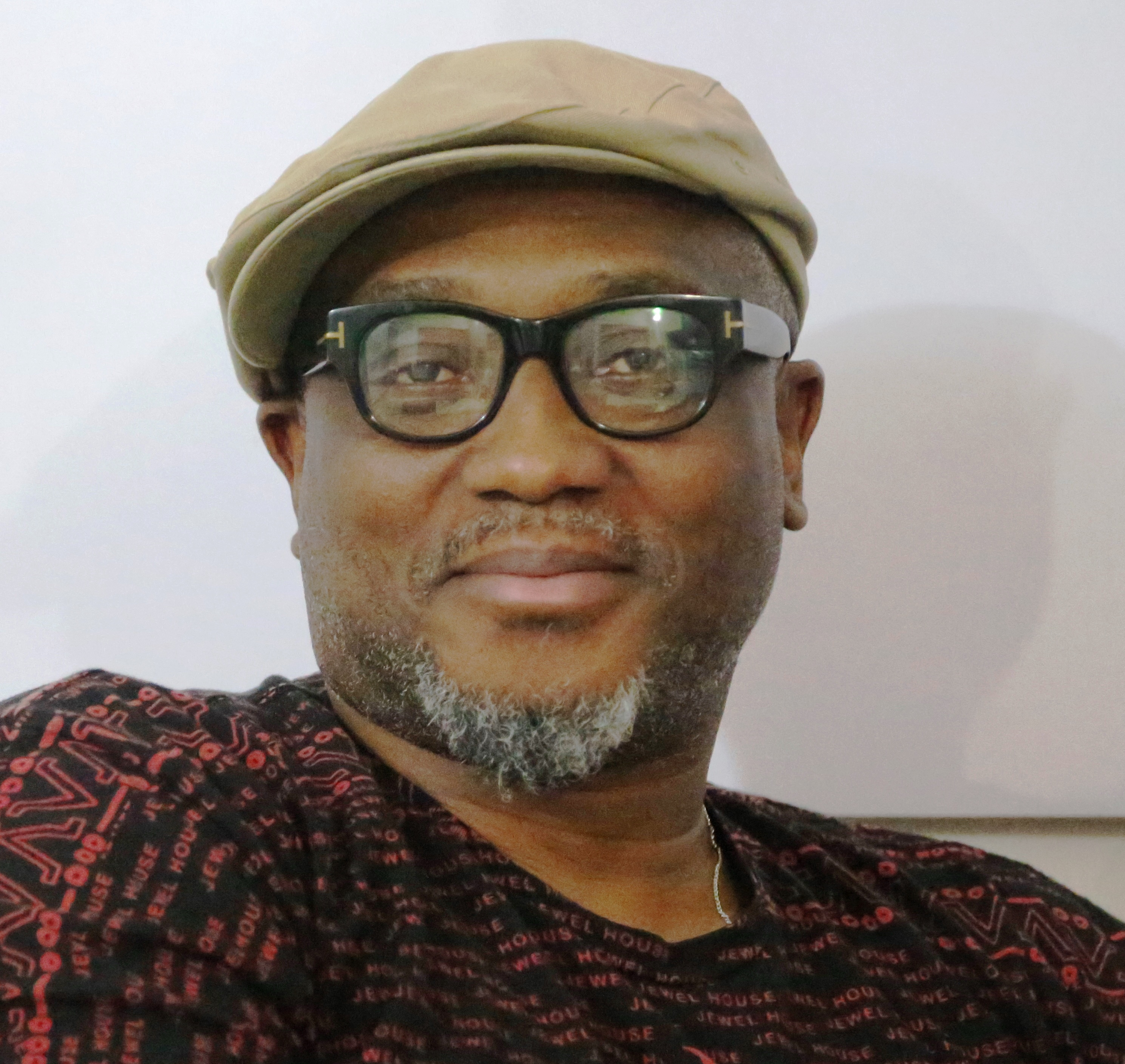
- Born: Mayowa Oluyeba; June 2 Lagos State, Nigeria
- Citizenship: Nigerian
- Occupations: Filmmaker; Editor; Producer; Director; Broadcast Technology Consultant
- Notable work: 'Battleground'(MNet 2017) 'Gidi Blues' (2016) 'TINSEL' (MNet 2009) 'Moments with Mo' 'Luventure'(2003 – 2007) 'Your Choice'(2001 – 2007) 'Style Quest'(2004) 'Crime Fighters; the Police & You' (2001) Reuters News Agency (2000)

Mayowa Oluyeba is a Nigerian Filmmaker, Broadcast Technology Consultant, and Director.

== Early life and education ==
Mayowa Oluyeba was born in Lagos State, Nigeria. He attended Saint Agnes Primary School, Maryland, Lagos and Maryland Comprehensive High School, Maryland, Lagos, Nigeria. He studied Banking and Finance at Kwara State Polytechnic, Kwara State, Nigeria, and obtained an online certification in People Analytics, from the University of Pennsylvania, Philadelphia, USA. Customer Analytics, University of Pennsylvania, Operation Analytics, University of Pennsylvania

== Career ==
Oluyeba's career in the creative industry started when he incidentally met the late Film Producer/Director, Amaka Igwe.

He thereafter joined Solar Productions owned by Gboyega Adelaja, with Olumide Ofere and Remi Ogunpitan as directors in the company. There he gained exposure to TV and Film Production.

In 1997, he partnered with his friend Remi Kehinde, to start Mega Visions - A Special Effects Company for home videos. They produced Special Effects for various movies including 'Haunted' and the movie, 'Oshodi Oke' (featuring actress Ronke Ojo). He joined Reuters News Agency in the year 2000. He worked as a news stringer and he covered breaking news stories across Nigeria, shot footages for Africa Journal and transmitted news via live wire. Oluyeba reported stories for Reuters during the late Moshood Abiola political era, the Yoruba/Hausa fights, and many others'.

Oluyeba joined Bi-Communications as an Editor, and worked on the Nigerian Police sponsored series 'Crime Fighters - the Police & You', which was a re-enactment of the Nigerian Police narrative, where he worked with Director/Producer, Tade Ogidan.

== Personal work ==
Mayowa Oluyeba started Phoenix Visions Limited – a company that offers consultancy services in Broadcast Studio Configuration and Installations, Live Streaming – Installations and Operations, Equipment Purchase, and General Broadcast Engineering and maintenance.

Oluyeba has also worked on various productions including:

- Moments with Mo
- DV Worx Studios
- Gidi Blues
- The Room – Nkoyo
- Shell Short Film Documentaries
- Sex Abuse (Short Film – ProjectTen4)
- Healing Streams of God Choir Yearly Carols

In September 2016, Mayowa Oluyeba was signed by Zuri24 Media to be the Series Producer for 'Battleground' (M-Net Commissioned Daily Telenovela 2017).

== See also ==
- List of Nigerian film producers
