= Bose Alao =

Nigerian actress and producer (born 1985)

- Born: Bose Alao Omotoyossi; 6 January 1985 (age 41); Lagos State, Nigeria
- Other names: Bose Alao; Bosslady; BAO
- Education: Lagos City Polytechnic
- Occupations: Actor; filmmaker; producer; endorsement model; entrepreneur
- Years active: 2003–present
- Spouse: Razak Omotoyossi
- Children: 4

Bose Alao Omotoyossi (born 6 January 1985) is a Nigerian Nollywood actress and producer.

== Early life ==
Bose was born in Lagos in a family of 5, as the 4th child. She came to prominence after her performance in a Yoruba Nollywood movie titled Itakun.

Bose completed her primary school education at Command Children School and attended Gideon Comprehensive High School graduating in 2002. Her tertiary education was at University of Lagos - where she was due to study biology (differed her admission after she conceived shortly after her introduction, due to multiple births, she was unable to go back). She attended Lagos City Polytechnic Ikeja where she obtained a National Diploma in Business Administration.

== Career ==
Bose is a Professional Nollywood actor, Filmmaker, Endorsement Model, and Entrepreneur.

== Personal life ==
Bose is married to Razak Omotoyossi a Nigerian-born Beninese footballer and is the mother of 4 girls.

== Production ==
- Imoran Ika (2006)
- Opa Abo (2007)
- Olasubomi (2011)
- Bomilashiri (2013)
- Rivers Between (2014)
- Rough Day (2016)
- Blindspots (2016)

== Accolades ==
Zafaa Awards United Kingdom 2011(Best Actress)

== Filmography ==
Year	Film	Role	Notes
2004	Aye jobele	"Aduke"	Drama With Bayo Adedeji, Lateef Adekunle
2007	Mo Nbo Wa Olorun		Drama With Femi Adebayo, Sola Kosoko
2013	Wanabe	"Halima Abubakar's friend"	
2015	Ijogbon	"Bidemi, Femi Adebayo's controversial wife"	
2016	Super Dad	"Nadia"	
2015	Rivers between	"Bridget the 1st daughter"	
2016	Rough Day	"Olivia Julliet Ibrahim's Rival"	
2006	Oko Asa	"Young Bukky Wright "	
2006	Edge of Paradise	"Lab Attendant"	"Directed by Creg Odutayo - an MNET Production"
2016	Torment	"Titi, a snitch to Ebere Mcniwizu"	
2016	Imoran ika	"Georgina"	
2016	Thorny	"Georgina"	" With Ebube Nwagbo, Frank Artus and Eucheria Anunobi"
2014	Papa ajasco	"Pepeye's friend"	"Produced by Wale Adenuga"
2011	Onikola	"a female that refused circumcision"	
2007	Opa Abo	"Moriyike "	
2014	Bomilashiri	"Adeola"	
2006	ITAKUN	"Daughter to Racheal Oniga & Moyosore Olutayo"	
2010	Olasubomi	"Olasubomi"	

== See also ==
- Ini Edo
- Funke Akindele
- Juliet Ibrahim
- Emem Isong
- Omotola Jalade Ekeinde
- Dakore Akande

== See also ==
- List of Nigerian film producers
