= Akin Ogungbe =

Nigerian film actor, filmmaker, producer and director

- Born: Christopher Akintola Ogungbe; 1934; Abeokuta, Ogun State, Nigeria
- Died: November 28, 2012 (aged 77–78)
- Other names: Ireke Onibudo and Baba Ibeji
- Occupations: actor; filmmaker; producer; director
- Years active: 1953-2012

Christopher Akintola Ogungbe// (1934 – November 2012) was a Nigerian film actor, filmmaker, producer and director.

== Early life and career ==
He was born in 1934 at Abeokuta, the capital of Ogun State, southwestern Nigeria where he later died in November 2012. His mother took him to live with his grandmother after he stopped schooling, at first he went to learn to tailor He started by watching Baba GT Onimole as an apprentice, according to his brother his first play was title "a terrible life"and his stage name is Baba Ibeji. He had featured, directed and produced several Nigerian films such as Ireke Onibudo and 50/50, a movie produced in 1992 that featured the veteran comic actor Bolaji Amusan.

== Personal life ==
He had 20 wives and 50 children, among his children is a Nigerian film actor, director and producer, Segun Ogungbe.

== Selected filmography ==
- 50/50 (1992) (actor and story)
- Ireke Onibudo
- Asiri Baba Ibeji
- Ologbo Jigolo
- Lisabi
- Igba funfun

== See also ==
- List of Nigerian film producers
- List of Yoruba people
