= Stephanie Okereke Linus =

Nigerian actress (born 1982)

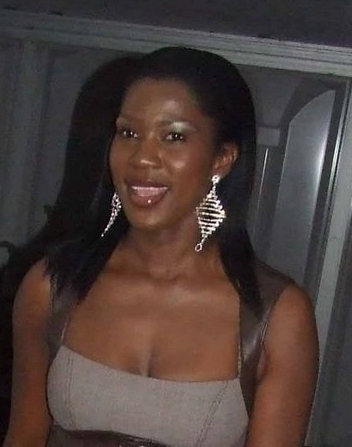
- Born: Stephanie Onyekachi Okereke; 2 October 1982 (age 44); Ngor Okpala, Imo, Nigeria
- Education: University of Calabar, New York Film Academy
- Occupations: Actress, Director, Model
- Spouse: Linus Idahosa (m. 2012)
- Children: 2
- Awards: 2005 1st Africa Movie Academy Awards
- Website: www.stephaniedaily.com

Stephanie Okereke Linus // (born as Stephanie Onyekachi Okereke; 2 October 1982) is a Nigerian actress, film director and model. She has received several awards and nominations for her work as an actress, including the 2003 Reel Award for Best Actress, the 2006 Afro Hollywood Award for Best Actress, and three nominations for Best Actress in a Leading Role at the Africa Movie Academy Awards in 2005, 2009 and 2010. She was also the runner up for the Most Beautiful Girl in Nigeria beauty pageant of 2002. In 2011, she was honoured by the Nigerian government with a national honour of Member of the Order of the Federal Republic, MFR. Stephanie is also a scriptwriter, a Producer and a Director.

== Early life and education ==
Stephanie Okereke was born in Ngor Okpala, Imo State. She is the sixth child of Mary and Chima Okereke's eight children. She completed her primary and secondary education in Delta State. She studied at the University of Calabar in Cross River State, where she graduated with a degree in English and Literary Studies.

== Career ==
While she was still a teenager in the year 1997, she starred in two Nollywood movies; Compromise 2 and Waterloo. During the 2002 Most Beautiful Girl in Nigeria beauty pageant, Okereke reached 3rd place. A year later in 2003, Okereke won two awards, out of the eight nominations she received, at the 2003 Reel Awards for 'Best Actress - English' and 'Best Actress of the year 2003'. After graduating from the New York Film Academy in 2007, Okereke released the movie Through the Glass in which she served as director, scriptwriter, producer and actress. The film received an Africa Movie Academy Award nomination for Best Screenplay in 2009. In 2014, she released another movie, Dry and again served as a director, scriptwriter, producer and actress which won many awards including 12th Africa Movie Academy Awards and 2016 Africa Magic Viewers' Choice Awards best movie overall movie with the prize of a brand new car. Okereke has starred in over 90 movies.

In March 2017 she was appointed as a Regional Ambassador for the UNFPA, and she held this position until 2020.

In March 2021, as part of her campaign against gender-based violence on the female folk, the actress released two short movies (which she produced) titled The Student and Bad Police.

In 2024 she was awarded the Lennox K. Black International Prize for Excellence in Medicine by Thomas Jefferson University.

== Personal life ==
In April 2005, on her way to the Africa Movie Academy Awards held in Yenagoa, Bayelsa State, Nigeria. Okereke was involved in a serious car accident that left her with burns all over and a broken leg.

In April 2012, Okereke married Linus Idahosa in Paris, France at a private wedding ceremony that was attended by members of her family and scores of Nollywood actresses and actors. Their first son Maxwell Enosata Linus was born in October 2015. They welcomed their second son in May 2022, seven years after their first son.

Okereke and her husband celebrated their 13th anniversary on 19 April 2024.

== Awards and nominations ==
Year	Event	Prize	Recipient	Result
2003	What a Year Awards	Best Actress	Herself	Won
2003	Reel Awards	Best Actress - English	Herself	Won
2003	Reel Awards	Best Actress of the year	Herself	Won
2004	Afro-Dublin Awards	Outstanding Actress	Herself	Won
2004	Film Makers of Nigeria	Award For Excellence	herself	Won
2005	1st Africa Movie Academy Awards,	Best Actress in a Leading Role	Herself	Nominated
2006	Afro Hollywood Award	Best Actress	herself	Won
2009	5th Africa Movie Academy Awards	Best Actress in a Leading Role	Reloaded	Nominated
2009	5th Africa Movie Academy Awards	Best Screenplay	Through the Glass	Nominated
2010	6th Africa Movie Academy Awards	Best Actress in a Leading Role	Nnenda	Nominated
2013	Montage Africa Women of Exllence Awards	Achievement in drama and entertainment	Herself	Won
2015	2015 Best of Nollywood Awards	Movie With the Best Social Media	Dry	Won
2015	2015 Best of Nollywood Awards	Best Actress Leading Role	Dry	Nominated
2015	2015 Best of Nollywood Awards	Best Director	Dry	Nominated
2015	2015 Best of Nollywood Awards	Movie of the Year	Dry	Nominated
2015	Bentonville Film Festival	Best Protagonist	Dry	Won
2015	ZAFAA Global Awards	Best Actress	Dry	Won
2015	ZAFAA Global Awards	Best Film	Dry	Won
2015	ZAFAA Global Awards	Best Producer	Dry	Won
2015	ZAFAA Global Awards	Best Director	Dry	Won
2016	12th Africa Movie Academy Awards	Best Nigerian Film	Dry	Won
2016	12th Africa Movie Academy Awards	Best Film	Dry	Nominated
2016	12th Africa Movie Academy Awards	Best Director	Dry	Nominated
2016	2016 Africa Magic Viewers Choice Awards	Best Overall Movie (Africa)	Dry	Won
2016	2016 Africa Magic Viewers Choice Awards	Best Director	Dry	Nominated
2016	2016 Africa Magic Viewers Choice Awards	Best Movie West Africa	Dry	Nominated
2016	Pan African Film Festival	Programmers'Award Narrative Feature	Dry	Won
2016	Nafca	Best Actress In Leading Role	Dry	Won
2016	Nafca	Best Overall Movie	Dry	Won
2016	Nafca	Best Director	Dry	Nominated
2016	Nafca	Best Screenplay	Dry	Nominated
2016	Nafca	Best Drama Film	Dry	Nominated
2016	DALA awards	Face of Nollywood (Female)	Herself	Won
2017	Truth Awards	Best Supporting Actress	Boonville Redemption	Won

== Filmography ==
Year	Film	Role	Notes
1997	Compromise 2		
1997	Waterloo		
2002	Pretender		with Patience Ozokwor and Tony Umez
2002	Blind Justice		with Tony Umez
2003	Aristos	Star	
2003	Emotional Crack	Crystal	with Ramsey Nouah, Dakore Egbuson and Patience Ozokwor
2003	Genesis of Love		
2003	Private Sin		with Genevieve Nnaji, Richard Mofe-Damijo and Patience Ozokwor
2003	Queen Sheba		
2003	The Cross of Love	Lynda	with Patience Ozokwor
2003	Together as One		
2004	Beautiful Faces		with Ini Edo
2004	Critical Decision		with Genevieve Nnaji, Richard Mofe-Damijo & Mike Ezuruonye
2004	Deep Loss		with Desmond Elliot
2004	Diamond Lady: The Business Woman		
2004	Dream Lover	Benita	
2004	Eye of the Gods	Princess Ekemma	with Ini Edo
2004	In the Name of Love		with Desmond Elliot
2004	Last Girl Standing	Thilda	
2004	Magic Moment	Stephine Okereke	with Desmond Elliot
2004	Mama-G in America		with Patience Ozokwor
2004	Miss Nigeria	Ruby	
2004	More Than a Woman	Tricia	
2004	My Mother My Marriage		
2004	Official Romance		with Zack Orji
2004	Promise & Fail		with Desmond Elliot
2004	Promise Me Forever	Bukky	with Genevieve Nnaji
2004	Right Man for Me		with Tony Umez
2004	Sensational Spy	Sandra	
2004	Strength of a Woman		with Emeka Ike
2004	To Love Again		
2004	Virgins Night Out		
2004	Working Class Lady		with Rita Dominic
2005	A Time to Die		with Olu Jacobs, Emeka Enyiocha
2005	Days of Bondage	Lucia	with Clarion Chukwura, Muna Obiekwe
2005	Guys on the Line		with Rita Dominic
2005	Lonely Hearts		with Ini Edo
2005	Ola... the Morning Sun		with Pete Edochie
2005	Omalinze	Adaugo	with Onyeka Onwenu
2005	Price of Ignorance		with Pete Edochie
2005	Princess of Wealth		with Saint Obi
2005	Royal Battle		with Laide Bakare, Amaechi Muonagor, Saint Obi
2005	Street Fame		with Nnamdi Eze, Tony Goodman, Saint Obi
2005	Windfall		with Pete Eneh, Emeka Ike
2005	Woman on Top		with Uche Elendu, Andy Chukwu, Ifeoma Anyiam
2006	Behind the Plot		with Desmond Elliot
2006	Daytime Lovers	Binta	with Tony Umez
2006	Efficacy		with Desmond Elliot
2006	Shut In		
2006	Sitanda	Ann	directed by Izu Ojukwu, this film received 9 nominations and won 5 awards at the 3rd Africa Movie Academy Awards in 2007, including Best Picture & Best Nigerian Film.
2006	The Law Students		
2006	The Preacher		
2006	Upside Down	Nneka	with Patience Ozokwor and Tony Umez
2007	A Time to Love	Hope	with Desmond Elliot
2007	Governor's Wife		with Ramsey Nouah
2008	Mission to Nowhere	Pamela	
2008	Hidden Treasure	Nadine	with Ramsey Nouah, Nadia Buari & Olu Jacobs
2008	Through the Glass	Ada	with Garrett McKechnie, Christy Williams, Pascal Atuma
2009	Nnenda		this film, directed Izu Ojukwu, received 3 nominations at the Africa Movie Academy Awards in 2010, including the nomination for Heart of Africa
2009	Reloaded	Weyinmi	with Ramsey Nouah, Desmond Elliot, Rita Dominic & Nse Ikpe Etim
2013	Doctor Bello	Bola Ayodeji	with Tony Abulu, Tina Amuzian, Hakeem Abdulrahman
2014	Dry	Dr Zara	with Liz Benson
2015	Make Me Fabulous		
2016	Boonville Redemption	Doris	with Pat Boone, Ed Asner, Diane Ladd and Richard Tyson
2019	Miracle in the Valley	Doris	with Emily Hoffman, Pat Boone, Edward Asner
2021	Clash	Lolo Chinyere	with Pascal Atuma, Michelle Akanbi
