= Babatunde Agunloye =

Nigerian actor, director and producer (born 1977)

- Born: Babatunde Faruk Agunloye; Lagos State
- Citizenship: Nigerian
- Education: Lagos State University; Toronto Film School
- Occupations: Actor; director; producer
- Known for: Aajule keji Realm 2

Babatunde Faruk Agunloye (born 26 July 1977), is a Canadian-based Nigerian film director and movie producer. He is known for his movie Aajule keji Realm 2 which earned him the best short film international award in Toronto International Nollywood Film Festival awards.

== Early life ==
Babatunde hails from Ogun State and was born and grew up in Lagos. He attended Ire-Akari Estate model primary school, Isolo and Air Force secondary school, Ikeja then proceeded to Lagos State University Ojo and furthered his education at Toronto Film School, Toronto.

== Career ==
In 2022, Babatunde Agunloye won the Best short film international category in Toronto International Nollywood Film Festival awards with his movie titled 'Aajule keji Realm 2’

In 2024, Babatunde was named among the top African Filmmakers in Diaspora Charting A New Path in the Movie Industry by Leadership. In the same year, he produced the first ever largely black cast production on Canadian TV.

== Filmography ==
| Year | Title | Role | Ref |
|---|---|---|---|
| 2020 | Third Scar | Director/Writer | |
| 2021 | Love in Transition | Assistant Director | |
| 2022 | Psalm 23 | Director | |
| 2022 | Crosses | Editor | |
| 2024 | Realm 2 | Director | |

== Awards and nominations ==
| Year | Award | Category | Result | Ref |
|---|---|---|---|---|
| 2022 | Toronto International Nollywood Film Festival | Best short film | Won | |
