= Mahmood Ali-Balogun =

Nigerian filmmaker

- Born: 19 July 1959 (age 66)
- Citizenship: Nigerian
- Education: Dramatic Arts, Obafemi Awolowo University
- Occupations: Filmmaker, Cultural worker
- Notable work: Tango With Me

Mahmood Ali-Balogun is a Nigerian filmmaker, cultural worker and the managing director of Brickhouse Media. He directed the multiple award-winning film 'Tango With Me'. He is the Chairman of the Audio Visual Rights Society (AVRS) of Nigeria.

== Early life and career ==
Mahmood Ali-Balogun was born on July 19, 1959 and grew up in Northern Nigeria. He is an Alumnus of University of Ife, now the Obafemi Awolowo University where he studied Dramatic Arts specialized in film and television production. Mahmood's career has evolved over the years from being an actor, to director, producer, industry leader, film consultant and ambassador in the Film making industry. Since 1999 Mahmood has also directed six award winning documentaries.

== Filmography ==
Year	Titles	Category	Roles
1983	Ola Rotimi's play,’ If.. A Tragedy of the Ruled’	Movie	Actor
1999	A Place Called Home	Movie	Director
2002	Child & Women Trafficking- The New Slavery	Documentary	Producer, director
2003	‘Temi ni Toto’	Yoruba home movie	Producer, director
2003	Environmental Pollution In Nigeria	Documentary	Producer, director
2005	Collage Of Cultural Colours (Japan)	Documentary	Producer, director
2005	Dance Of The Maidens -Traditional Marriages In Nigeria” (Series)	Documentary (Television Series)	Producer, director
2008	Peace Mission	Documentary	Actor (Commentaries)
2010	Tango With Me Best Directing Award category 2012 Nollywood Movies Awards	Movie	Director, producer, writer
2013	Flower Girl	Romantic Comedy	Film Consultant
2022	Man of God	Movie	Consulting producer
2024	Funmilayo Ransome-Kuti	Movie	Consulting producer

== Industry roles ==
- Member: Advisory Council for the Nigerian Film Industry
- Member: Advisory Board, African Movies Academy Awards AMAA
- President: 9th Congress, Federation Panafricaine Des Cineates (FEPACI). South Africa, 2013
- Current Chairman: Audio Visual Rights Society of Nigeria (AVRS)
- Founding President: National Association of Nigeria Theatre Arts Practitioners (NANTAP)
- Former Vice President: Independent Television Producers Association of Nigeria (ITPAN)
- Panelist: The Toronto International Film Festival, TIFF 2013, Toronto, 2013
- Advisor: African International Film Festival, AFRIFF
- Ambassador: Nollywood Film Festival in Paris, 2014
- Industry Ambassador: Africa International Film Festival (AFRIFF), Calabar, 2013
- Jury: 2015 International Emmy Awards
- Jury: Africa International Film Festival (AFRIFF), Calabar, 2014
- Jury: 32nd Cairo International Film Festival(CIFF),
- Panelist: Abuja International Film Festival
- Jury: Zuma International Film Festival
- Member: Advisory Council for African International Film Festival, 2013
- Member: Steering Committee, Motion Picture Council of Nigeria (MOPICON), 2007
- Founding Member: Conference of Motion Picture Practitioners of Nigeria (CMPPN)

== See also ==
- List of Nigerian film producers
