= Pascal Atuma =

Nigerian actor and director

- Born: Abia State, Nigeria
- Education: University of Port Harcourt
- Occupations: Actor, screenwriter, film producer

Pascal Atuma is a Nigerian actor, director, screenwriter, and film producer, and entrepreneur. He is the CEO of TABIC Record Label. Born in Ikwuano, Umuahia, Abia State, he attended Government College, Umuahia, and attended University of Port Harcourt, Rivers State. He attended KD Conservatory-College of Film & Dramatic Arts in Dallas, Texas, US, and was awarded a Certificate in Entrepreneurship Specialization from the University of Pennsylvania.

== Career ==
He starred in films including Sweet Revenge, Eat my Shorts by Lions Gate, Bloodlines, LAPD African Cops, The Other Side of Love, My American Nurse, and Secret Past. He was the host of One-World with Pascal Atuma, The House of Commons. He directed the first thirteen episodes of Professor Johnbull and Clash (2019).

He has a partnership deal with Kastina State Ministry of Youths and Sports Development.

== Personal life ==
The Nigerian actor resides in Canada.

== Filmography ==
=== Actor ===
Year	Title	Role
2004	Life in New York	Oscar
2004	In His Kiss	African Prince
2004	Accidental Life	The Boyfriend
2005	Only in America	Mandela
2006	My American Nurse	Shehu
2008	Through the Glass (with Stephanie Okereke)	Lawyer Robert
2009	Hurricane in the Rose Garden	Dr. Joseph Shehu
2010	My American Nurse 2	Shehu
2011	Secret Past	Desmond
2011	Okoto the Messenger	Okoto
2012	The Mechanic-Who Is the Man	Kumasi
2013	Hawa (Short)	Jonas
2014	Blood Lines	Icon
2014	Busted Life	Clerk
2016	LAPD African Cops	Officer Ghana
2018	Sweet Revenge (Short)	Mr. Mandela
2019	Only You & Me (post-production)	Phil
2020	Clash	Chief Okereke

=== Producer ===
Year	Title	Role
2005	Only in America	Producer
2006	My American Nurse	Executive Producer / Producer
2009	Hurricane in the Rose Garden (Video)	Producer
2010	My American Nurse 2	Producer
2011	Okoto the Messenger	Producer
2012	The Mechanic-Who Is the Man	Executive Producer / Producer
2014	Blood Lines	Producer
2016	LAPD African Cops	Executive Producer / Producer
2018	Sweet Revenge (Short)	Producer
2020	Clash	Producer

=== Writer / Screenplay ===
Year	Title
2005	Only in America
2006	My American Nurse
2009	Hurricane in the Rose Garden (Video)
2010	My American Nurse 2 (Screenplay & Story)
2011	Okoto the Messenger
2012	The Mechanic-Who Is the Man
2014	Blood Lines
2016	LAPD African Cops
2018	Sweet Revenge (Short)
2020	Clash

=== Director ===
Year	Title
2006	My American Nurse
2010	My American Nurse 2
2011	Okoto the Messenger
2012	The Mechanic-Who Is the Man
2014	Blood Lines
2016	LAPD African Cops
2017	Gone To America
2018	Sweet Revenge (Short)
2020	Clash
2025	Imported Wives

=== Casting Department ===
Year	Title	Role
2011	Okoto the Messenger	Casting

=== Self ===
Year	Title	Role
2018	Mister Tachyon (TV Series documentary)	Dr. Tachyon

== Awards ==
Atuma won Best Male Actor in the 2012 and 2015 Golden Icons Academy Movie Awards (GIAMA). He was awarded the 2013 Lifetime Achievement Award during the Los-Angeles Nollywood Film Award (LANFA) and in 2015, his film L.A.P.D. African Cops won GIAMA Best Film.

== See also ==
- List of Nigerian film producers
