= Dorcas Shola-Fapson =

Nigerian actress

Dorcas Shola Fapson
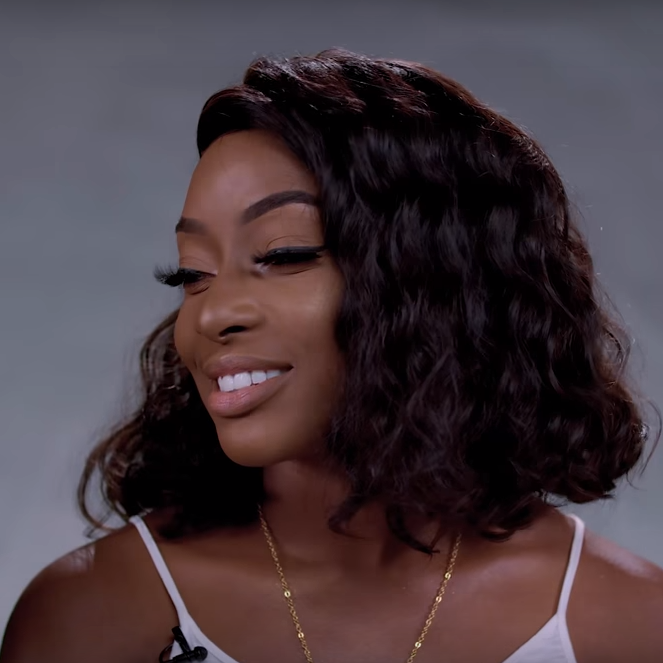
- Presenting in 2018 for Ndani TV
- Born: North London, United Kingdom
- Occupation: Actress
- Years active: 2016–present

Dorcas Shola Fapson best known as Ms DSF, is a Nigerian actress, DJ and presenter, known for her role as Sophie in MTV's Shuga. In 2020, she returned to the Shuga series as it dealt with COVID-19 issues, with the actors doing the filming over several African countries.

== Early life, education and career ==
Fapson was born in London. Her mother died when she was 14 and she completed her first degree in Criminology in England. She then went on to study acting in New York.

She has appeared in series 3 of MTV Shuga as 'Sophie' and she was the presenter of "The Juice" an interview series for NdaniTV.

She returned to her role as medical expert "Sophie" when MTV Shuga went into a mini-series titled MTV Shuga Alone Together highlighting the COVID-19 pandemic. The series was written by Tunde Aladese and broadcast for several nights - its backers include the United Nations. The series was based in Nigeria, South Africa, Kenya and Côte d'Ivoire and the story progressed using on-line conversations between the characters. All of the filming was done by the actors who included Mohau Cele, Lerato Walaza, Sthandiwe Kgoroge, Uzoamaka Aniunoh, Mamarumo Marokane and Jemima Osunde.

She is also a DJ under the name "Ms DSF", she featured in the Cultur FM Dj show in 2024.

== Filmography ==
=== Film ===
- The Queen's Fiction (2016) as Queen
- Banana Island Ghost (2017) as Titi
- My Wife & I (2017) as Jumoke Fashanu
- The Essence (2019)
- Teju's Tale (2021) as Teju
- Man of God (2022) as Rekya
- The Perfect Arrangement (2022) as Sope-Bakare Kalejaiye
- Soft Love (2024) as Amaka

=== Television ===
- Shuga (season 3): Shuga Naija (2013–2014, 2020) as Sophie - 8 episodes
- Hustle (2016–2018)
- Castle & Castle (2019–2021) as Doshima - 15 episodes
- The Capture (2019-2022) as Victoria Bello - 1 episode
- Life and Dirt (2024) as Ij

== See also ==
- List of Yoruba people
