= Folu Storms =

Nigerian actress

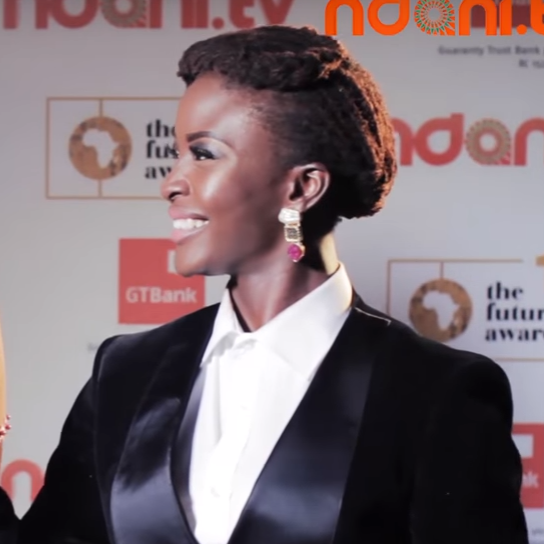
- Ada Afoluwake Ogunkeye in 2020
- Born: Ada Afoluwake Ogunkeye; 25 November 1986 (age 39); Lagos State, Nigeria
- Education: University of Bristol; Aberystwyth University
- Occupations: Media personality; actress
- Years active: 2012–present

Ada Afoluwake Ogunkeye (born 25 November 1986) known professionally as Folu Storms, is a Nigerian media personality and actress.

== Early life ==
Storms was born in Aguda, Surulere, Lagos state. She attended primary school at Corona VI, then had her secondary education first at The Lagoon Secondary School, then St Leonards Mayfield in the UK and then proceeded to Aberystwyth University where she studied for a Bachelor of Laws (LLB) between 2005 and 2008. Storms later enrolled at the University of Bristol for her Master of Laws (LLM) in 2009. Storms has a diploma in Broadcast Journalism from Pan-African University.

== Career ==
=== Radio and NdaniTV ===
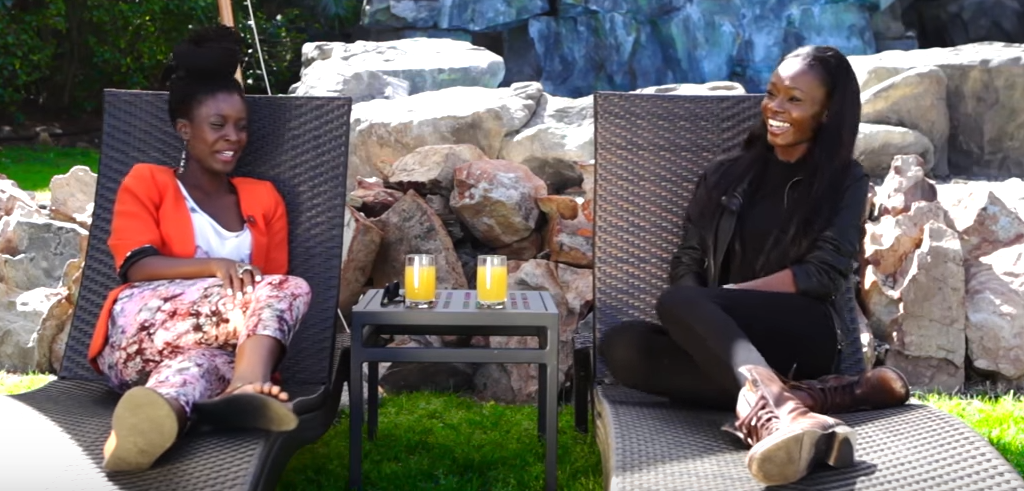
Model Adeola Ariyo and Folu Storms in South Africa for the New Africa series.

Storms began to work as a lawyer, before she started with the radio station 92.3 Inspiration fm in 2012. She competed for the MTV Base Africa's VJ search and she was one of the three finalists. Storms was later hired by the Nigerian company Ndani TV as a presenter and content producer where she produced The New Africa documentary which was nominated for best documentary award at the 2016 Africa Magic Viewers Choice Awards. She co-hosted the Breakfast show at Smooth 98.1FM in Lagos and was still doing this in 2019.

Storms won the 2017 Ebony Life TV Sisterhood Awards for TV Personality of the Year the 2018 On-Air Personality award for the Future awards and ELOY Awards.

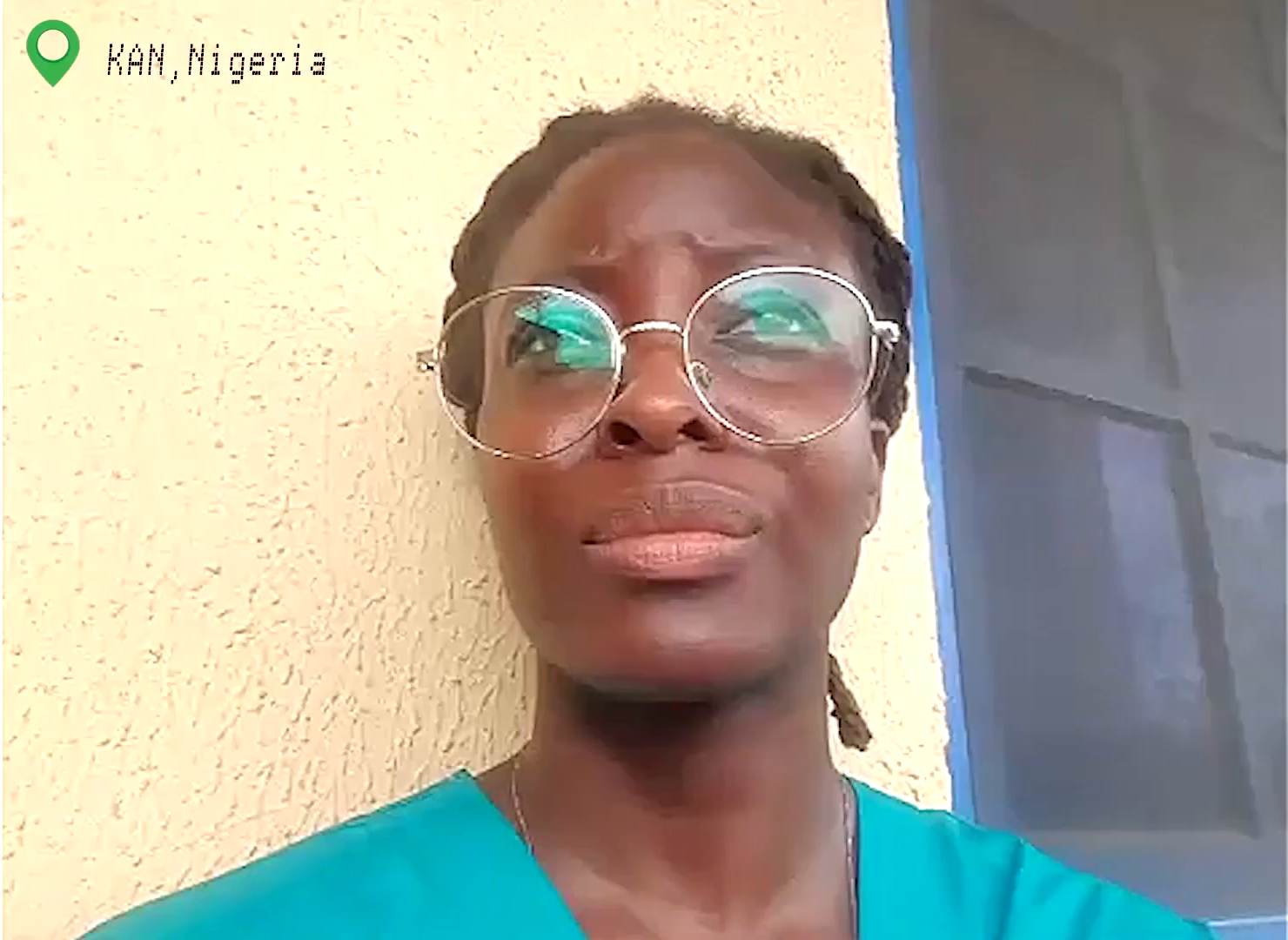
Appearing as "Sope" on-line in "Alone Together"

=== MTV Shuga Alone Together ===
The role of "Sope" was included when it went into a mini-series titled MTV Shuga Alone Together highlighting the problems of Coronavirus in April 2020. The series was written by Tunde Aladese and broadcast every night - its backers include the World Health Organization. The series was based in Nigeria, South Africa, Kenya and Côte d'Ivoire and the story progresses using online conversations on location between the characters. All of the makeup and filming was done by the actors who include Lerato Walaza, Mamarumo Marokane, and Jemima Osunde.

== Filmography ==
Year	Name	Role	Notes	Ref
2016	The New Africa Documentary	Producer	Won best documentary award at the AMVCA	
2019	MTV Shuga	Sope	Played alongside Osas Ighodaro	
2019	Man of Her Dreams	Ladi	Webseries	
2019	Rule Number 1		Showing on Showmax	
2019-20	Unmarried	Kamsi	Africa Magic original alongside Venita Akpofure and Enado Odigie	
2020	MTV Shuga Alone Together	Sope	Online miniseries highlighting the problems of the COVID-19 pandemic	
2020	The Men's Club (Season 3)	Tonye	Replaced Segilola Ogidan	
2021	Price of Admission		Short film starring Brymo	
2021	Charge and Bail			
2022	Crime and Justice Lagos	Kelechi Farasin		
2022	Cake			
2025	Baby Farm		Netflix series	
2025	Red Circle			

== Awards and nominations ==
Year	Event	Award	Result	Ref
2016	Africa Magic Viewers Choice Awards	Best Documentary	Won	
2017	Ebony Life TV Sisterhood Awards	TV Personality of the Year	Won	
2018	Future awards	On-Air Personality	Won	
2018	ELOY Awards	On-Air Personality	Won	
