= Global Strategy for Women's and Children's Health =

The Global Strategy for Women's and Children's Health was a program of the United Nations (UN) directed at improving women's and children's health in the developing world.

The program was announced by UN Secretary-General Ban Ki-moon in September 2010. At the time of the announcement, the program was valued at $US40 billion over a five-year period, funded by state and private donors, with the UN hoping for more pledges to follow. The objective of the program was to save the lives of 16 million people during the period of the program. As the Millennium Development Goals 4, 5 and 6 were showing the slowest rate of progression, this program was also instituted to gain momentum in achieving them. The implementation of the program was led by the World Health Organization, reporting to the UN.

The aid-based program was accompanied by pledges from some developing nations (including Tanzania and Rwanda) to increase their own domestic spending on health care. According to the UN, around $8.6 million of the program's funding came from what it described as "low-income countries".

International aid group Oxfam expressed doubts about the program, including the extent to which its funding was genuinely new.

== Progress: 2010-2015 ==
The Global Strategy managed to improve the coordination of global efforts towards the improvement of women's and children's health as well as enhancing strategies to tackle this. It gave rise to the "Every Woman Every Child" movement, which assisted in the mobilisation of stakeholders. Despite not reaching targets, reductions in both child and maternal mortality were noted; of 49% and 45% respectively from 1990 to 2013. 2.4 million maternal and child deaths were prevented. Prevention of mother-to-child transmission of HIV, oral rehydration therapy and exclusive breastfeeding coverage showed the most significant improvement, however, progress in vaccination and pneumonia was still lagging.

The United Nations also reported increased collaboration with the private sector, with an increase in donor funding of US$19.8 billion noted from September 2010 to May 2014.

== Post-2015 ==
The Global Health Strategy for Women, Children and Adolescents 2016-2030 was launched in September 2015, building on experience gained from 2010 to 2015, with the inclusion of adolescents as an additional target group. It is aligned with the Sustainable Development Goals (SDGs) and has 3 main objectives; namely for women, adolescents and children to "survive", "thrive" and "transform". It is an evidence-based, multi-sectoral approach and emphasises the need to address equity, with interventions applied across the life-course.

Although high returns on investment are projected, a monitoring report done in May 2018 shows that expected targets may not be achieved in time.

== Coronavirus ==
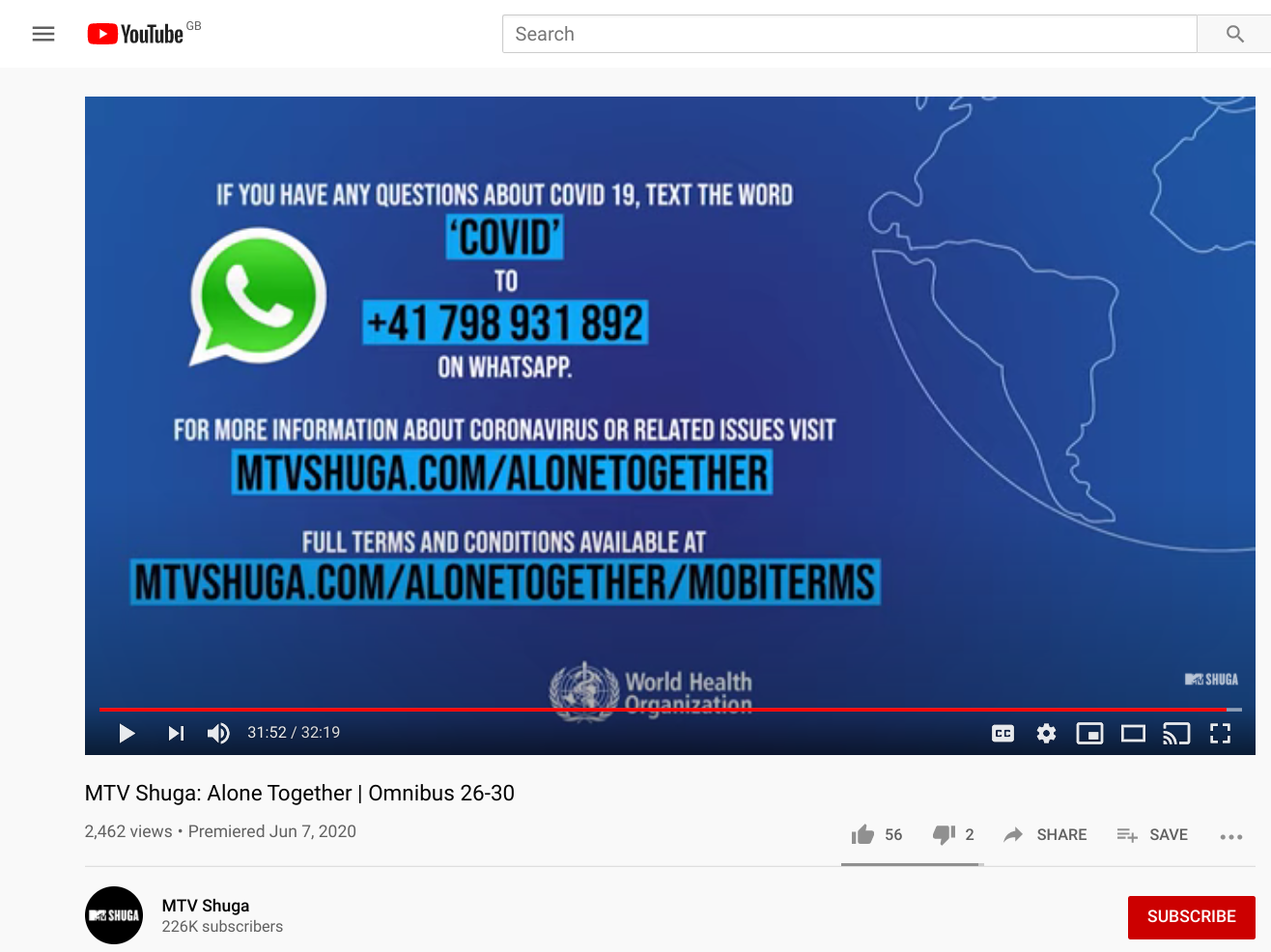
A closing screen after each episode gave sources of help

"Every Woman Every Child" fundedMTV Shuga and Viacom CBS Africa responded to the 2020 pandemic by creating the mini-series MTV Shuga Alone Together, which highlighted the problems of the COVID-19 pandemic. During the series the characters talk to each other about life during the lockdown. The mini-series was designed for 60 nights. The series is based in Nigeria, South Africa, Kenya and Côte d'Ivoire. All of the filming is done by the actors themselves, who include Jemima Osunde, Lerato Walaza, Folu Storms, Mamarumo Marokane and Mohau Cele.

== See also ==
- Muskoka Initiative
- Maternal health
- Global health
- Millennium Development Goals
- Child health and nutrition in Africa
