= Marang Selolwane =

Botswana actress and television host (born 1991)

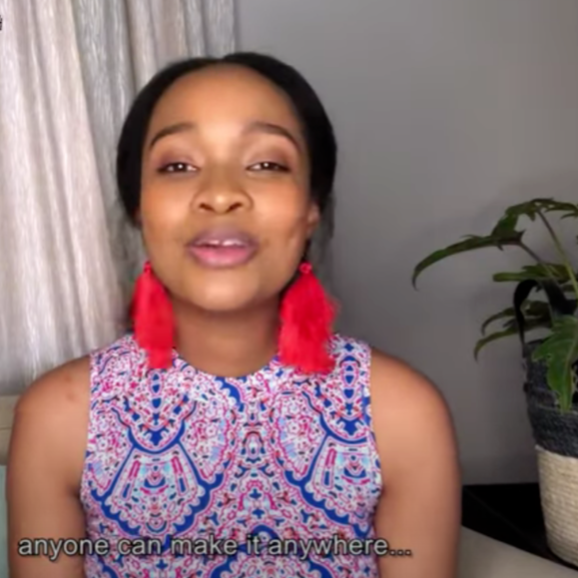
- Molosiwa in 2020
- Pronunciation: ([ˈmaɾaŋ]/MAH-rahng
- Born: Marang Rami Molosiwa; 1991 (age 34–35); Botswana
- Citizenship: Motswana
- Education: University of Pretoria (in 2013); University of Witwatersrand
- Occupations: Television Host & Actress
- Years active: 2003–present
- Known for: Mantlwaneng as Marang
- Spouse: Dipsy Selolwane
- Children: 2

Marang Rami Selolwane (née Molosiwa; born 1991) is a Motswana television host and actress. She hosted the television programme Mantlwaneng and appeared in the television drama series MTV Shuga in 2020 as the only actress from Botswana.

== Life ==
Selolwane comes from the Serowe Palapye area, but she was raised in Gaborone. She was introduced to her career in the entertainment industry in 2002 when she was 12 years old and went on to practice in the arts years later when she graduated with a BA Drama at the University of Pretoria in 2013, although another source says she graduated from University of the Witwatersrand.

She was the host of the children's television programme Mantlwaneng, a leading programme on a fledgling Botswana TV, where Selolwane was one of its child stars. Selolwane, Rea Kopi, Phenyo Mogampane and StaXx have gone on to careers based on this early experience.

Post Mantlwaneng, Selolwane branched out into other entertainment platforms such as hosting My African Dream and became a voice-over actress on a local drama called, Makgabaneng. In 2009, Selolwane took on a lead role in a short film that was a part of a 10-part Soul City television series called, One Love Stories.

After high school, Selolwane became an intern at various institutions a writer and doing administrative work, Lapologa Magazine is one of the more notable places she interned at. In 2010, Selolwane was involved in the shooting of a short film called Second Chances and it was that experience that cemented her love for performing arts.

At university Selolwane took on programmes such as Theatre for Development and Theatre in Education. She also involved in theatre productions as well. In August and September 2015, she led the cast at the Artscape Theatre Centre. She also co-directed a drama production titled Ketswakae at Maitisong Festival 2015.

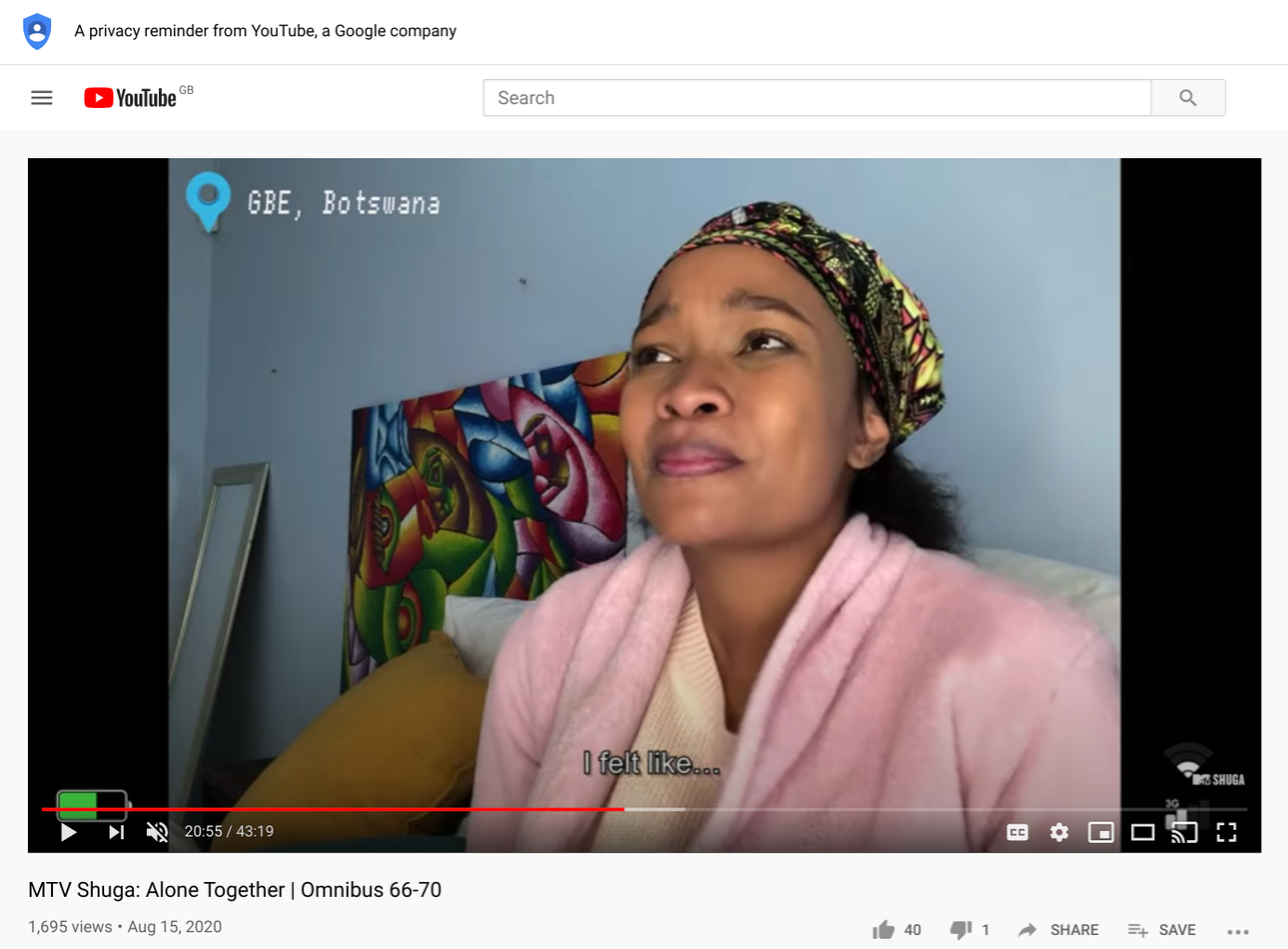
Marang Molosiwa as "Bokang" on-line in 2020 in MTV Shuga.

In 2020, she was cast in the multinational television series MTV Shuga. It was an edu-tainment series that had been targeted at HIV awareness. She played Bokang, a classmate of the character Dineo, who according to the story goes to South Africa for her education and then returns to Botswana. She is able to join the story as they chat on-line during the coronavirus lockdown.

MTV Shuga later transformed into a mini-series titled MTV Shuga Alone Together, highlighting the problems of Coronavirus, in 20 April 2020. The show was written by Tunde Aladese and Nkiru Njoku and was broadcast for 70 nights – its backers include the United Nations. The series was based in Nigeria, South Africa, Kenya and Côte d'Ivoire and the story was explained with on-line conversations between the characters. All of the filming, makeup, lighting, and other preparations, were done by the actors who include Lerato Walaza, Mohau Cele and Jemima Osunde She was the only actress from Botswana.

== Personal life ==
Selolwane announced that she and the retired footballer Dipsy Selolwane were having a child in May 2020. This was Selolwane's second child. They had been partners for four years, the pair got married in 2021.

== See also ==
- Sasa Klaas
- Charma Gal
