= Samke Makhoba =

South African actress

Samkelisiwe Makhoba
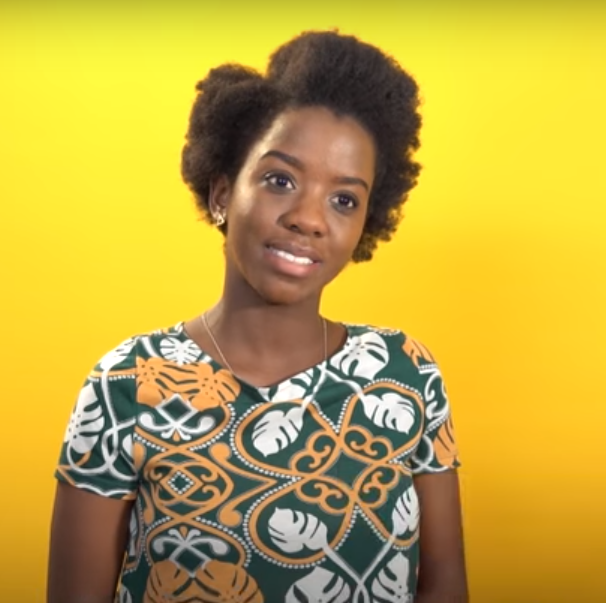
- Samke Makhoba
- Born: Samkelisiwe Nosipho Makhoba; Pinetown, KwaZulu-Natal, South Africa
- Education: Pinetown Girls' High School; University of the Western Cape; University of Witwatersrand
- Occupations: Actress, Filmmaker
- Employer: MTV Shuga

Samkelisiwe "Samke" Makhoba (born 25 July) is a South African actress who has a leading role in two series of MTV Shuga when it was set in South Africa.

== Life ==
Samke Makhoba was born in Pinetown. She first chose to study science at the University of the Western Cape but she then switched courses to study Film & Television at the University of Witwatersrand.

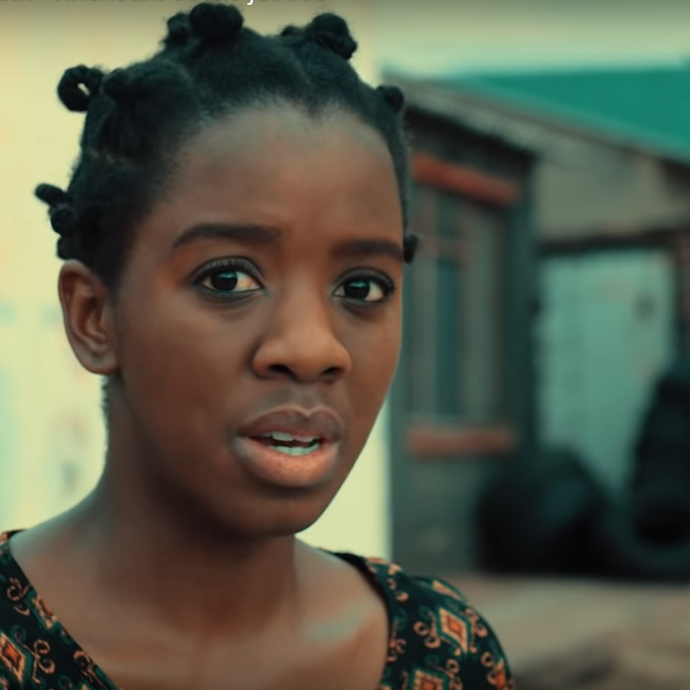
Khensani on MTV Shuga Down South in January 2019

Her first leading role was to play the major role of Khensani in the established series of MTV Shuga. Despite being 29 she was chosen in an open audition to play the fifteen-year-old teenager. MTV Shuga is a drama designed to assist in sexual education and Kensani's character has a relationship with an adult man. Other cast members included Jemima Osunde.

In 2017 she was given a second role in the SABC1 TV sitcom "Rented Family" where she played the lead character's daughter Zanele.

Makhoba and her character of Khensani in MTV Shuga series seven. Her story returned after a one-year break when the series returned to South Africa. Oladipupo was still in MTV Shuga as the character "Khensani" when it went into a nightly mini series titled MTV Shuga Alone Together highlighting the problems of Coronavirus in April 2020. The show was broadcast for 60 nights and its backers include the World Health Organization. The series was based in Nigeria, South Africa, Kenya and Cote D'Ivoire and the story will be explained with on-line conversations between the characters. All of the filming was done by the actors themselves who include Jemima Osunde, Lerato Walaza, Sthandiwe Kgoroge, Uzoamaka Aniunoh and Mohau Cele.
