= Shuga Naija =

- Season 3
- Promotional poster
- No. of episodes: 8

Release
- Original network: MTV Base
- Original release: 1 December 2013 – 19 January 2014

The third season of the television drama series Shuga, dubbed Shuga Naija, was first broadcast on MTV Base from December 2013 to January 2014. The season was written by Kemi Adesoye and directed by Biyi Bandele. It starred Tiwa Savage, Chris Attoh, Maria Okanrende, Emmanuel Ikubese, Sharon Ezeamaka, Efa Iwara, Dorcas Shola Fapson, Okezie Morro, Timini Egbuson, Kachi Nnochiri, Sanni Mu'azu and Leonora Okine. Shuga Naija is a multimedia campaign which educates youths on HIV, safe sex and teen pregnancy. It also touches on maternal and child health, family planning, gender-based violence, and women empowerment. The television series, which consists of eight episodes, was shot and set in Lagos State, produced in partnership with the National Agency for the Control of AIDS (NACA).

== Premise ==
Shuga Naija tells the story of different Lagos youths and how they deal with love, sex and relationships. Sophie (Dorcas Shola Fapson) is a campus "RunsGirl", who comes from a poor background and tries to sustain herself by sleeping with rich men; her sister also comes to visit her from the village and tries to adjust oddly to the city environment. Sade (Tiwa Savage) is an over-protective adoptive mother of a son who's HIV positive. Femi (Ikubese Emmanuel) returns from Nairobi and tries to make a fresh start. Ekene (Okezie morro) is a casanova who is a boyfriend to Foye (Maria Okanrende), an on-air personality and disc jockey. Solomon (Sani Mu'azu) is an aristo, who's HIV positive, and sleeps with young girls without protection. Malaika (Leonora Okine) is married to Nii (Chris Attoh), a man who constantly beats and violates her.

== Cast ==
Shuga Naija cast members with the director front row (L-R): Dorcas Shola Fapson, Biyi Bandele (director), Tiwa Savage, Chris Attoh second row (L-R): Leonora Okine, Timini Egbuson, Sharon Ezeamaka, Sani Mu'azu, Maria Okanrende, Owumi Ugbeye back row (L-R): Olumide Oworu, Nick Mutuma, Okezie Morro, Kachi Nnochiri, Emmanuel Ikubese

=== Main characters ===
- Dorcas Shola Fapson as Sophie (8 episodes)
- Emmanuel Ikubese as Femi (8 episodes)
- Okezie Morro as Ekene (8 episodes)
- Maria Okanrende as Foye (8 episodes)
- Timini Egbuson as Tobi (8 episodes)
- Sharon Ezeamaka as Princess (8 episodes)
- Sani Mu'azu as Solomon (8 episodes)
- Chris Attoh as Nii (7 episodes)
- Leonora Okine as Malaika (7 episodes)
- Olumide Oworu as Weki (6 episodes)

=== Supporting characters ===
- Tiwa Savage as Sade Banjo (8 episodes)
- Efa Iwara as David (8 episodes)
- Kachi Nnochiri as Osaro (8 episodes)
- Owumi Ugbeye as Bikiya (6 episodes)
- Samuel Ajibola as Chibuzo (1 episode)
- Nick Mutuma as Leo (1 episode)

=== Guest appearances ===
- KC Ejelonu as HIV Counselor (2 episodes)
- Blossom Chukwujekwu as Coach (1 episode)
- Iyanya as Iyanya (1 episode)
- Ice Prince as Ice Prince (1 episode)
- Vector as Vector: Season 4 (1 episode)

== Production ==
In June 2013, It was officially announced that the new seasons of Shuga will now be produced in Nigeria, as the previous seasons had been shot and produced in Kenya. At the unveiling event held at the Wheatbaker Hotel in Lekki on 25 June, it was stated that the new series will have a whole new look; with new predominantly Nigerian cast and crew. Ikubese Emmanuel and Nick Mutuma are the only actors from previous seasons who returned to the new season of the series. Speaking on the transition, Alex Okosi, the Managing Director of Viacom International Media Networks Africa says producing the project in Nigeria will help the realization of the series due to Nigeria's flourishing entertainment industry. According to Business Day, "When it is a Nollywood production it tends to get more recognition and embrace for people, both locally and internationally". The Head writer, Kemi Adesoye comments: "In bringing Shuga to Nigeria, I hope that we embrace it. I hope young people will learn, be entertained and ultimately change their lives. I would like Shuga to help start conversations between friends and families about issues relating to certain taboos, talk about HIV and about teen pregnancy". Bandele reportedly chose to work with Adesoye after seeing her screenplay for Kunle Afolayan's acclaimed film Phone Swap (2012).

In August, the cast of Shuga Naija was officially revealed and Tiwa Savage was revealed as one of the main casts in the season; this is Savage's first experience as an actor. Principal photography by Hein de Vos and Adekunle "Nodash" Adejuyigbe also commenced in August 2013; the series was shot mainly in Lagos State. As of September, rapper Ice Prince, musician Iyanya and previous Shuga seasons' actor, Nick Mutuma had also been associated with the project. The public were also allowed to vote for their two bests to be given a role out of six actors posted on Shuga website in August 2013. The season was produced by MTV Staying Alive Foundation, in conjunction with Nigeria's National Agency for the Control of AIDS (NACA), and the Bill & Melinda Gates Foundation. Other aspects introduced in the new season of the Shuga campaign includes: a radio drama series, a peer educator programme, a comic book in hausa and English languages, a mobile information service, campaign on social media and a range of digital platforms.

== Music and soundtrack ==
The title soundtrack, "Sweet Like Shuga" was written and produced by Del B, and performed by Flavour, Sound Sultan, Chidinma, KCee and Professor. The music video for the soundtrack was directed by Clarence Peters; it premiered on MTV Base in mid-November 2013 and was released on YouTube on 4 December. All other songs featured in Shuga Naija, like in the previous seasons, are independently produced.

=== Track listing ===
No.	Title	Singer(s)	Length
1.	"Sweet Like Shuga"	Flavour N'abania; Sound Sultan; Chidinma; KCee; Professor	5:43
2.	"Eminado"	Tiwa Savage; Don Jazzy	4:30
3.	"Ur Waist"	Iyanya	4:30
4.	"Bum Bum"	Timaya	3:39
5.	"Personally"	P-Square	3:17
6.	"Bachelor"	D'Banj	2:57
7.	"First of All"	Olamide	4:11
8.	"Jaiye Jaiye"	Wizkid; Femi Kuti	4:11
9.	"Ekoloma Demba"	Timaya	3:27
10.	"Sho Lee"	Sean Tizzle	3:24
11.	"Run My Race"	Burna Boy	4:32
12.	"The Matter"	Maleek Berry; Wizkid	3:23
13.	"Irawo"	Seyi Shay	3:47
14.	"Nag Champa GOLD"	Akua Naru	4:27
15.	"Changes"	Nneka	3:46
16.	"La historia es nuestra"	Nneka; Babatunde; Chiliscote	5:22
17.	"Clair De Lune"	Flight Facilities; Christine Hoberg	7:44
18.	"Kini Big Deal"	Naeto C	5:57
19.	"Azonto"	Wizkid	2:38
20.	"The Beat of Life (episode 1)"	Sarz	3:24
21.	"Take Banana"	D'Prince	8:28
22.	"Skelewu"	Davido	3:55
23.	"The Kick"	Wande Coal; Don Jazzy	4:13
24.	"V.I.P"	Ice Prince	3:11
25.	"Rock Your Body"	Dipp; Yemi Alade	4:28

== Release ==
The third season of Shuga premiered on 26 November 2013 at the Silverbird Cinema, Victoria Island, Lagos. A promo trailer was uploaded on YouTube on 27 November, and the show started airing on MTV Base on the 1 December 2013, World AIDS Day; it was subsequently broadcast on other MTV networks, and also available for online streaming via MTV Base' YouTube channel and on iROKOtv. The season was also broadcast by Nigerian terrestrial televisions and other third party television networks around the world. The season was broadcast via a total of 88 television networks, and have reportedly aired to more than 550 million households across the world. Shuga comic book, published by Kachifo Limited, was also launched in January 2014.

== Reception ==
The show was mostly well received by the general audience. Azeezat Fadekemi Sulaiman comments: "All the complexities of relationships are explored in this poignant drama that will force you to confront common preconceptions and prejudice about HIV/AIDS. Cheating, parenting and adolescence are all delved into in great detail. Shuga, directed by Biyi Bandele is a must watch for every African seeking to understand the intricacies of living with HIV". Bisoye Babalola of YNaija commends the character of Sophie and comments: "Shuga Naija is an educational yet captivating TV programme..... it paints a realistic picture of what situations and problems that young people in Nigeria or around the world encounter. The show is very inspiring and I would recommend it to people of all ages around the globe". Actress Beverly Naya comments: "Bringing Shuga to Nigeria is a very smart move as youths in Nigeria need to take the importance of sexual health seriously and using this medium to push this message as well as using Nigerian acts to create real life situations is a smart move".

== Episodes ==
No. overall	No. in season	Title	Directed by	Written by	Original release date	Prod. code
10	1	"Home Coming"	Biyi Bandele	Kemi Adesoye	1 December 2013	ShugaNaija Ep1
Femi (Ikubese Emmanuel) returns home to Lagos from Nairobi. Sophie (Dorcas Shola Fapson) sleeps with her Aristo, Solomon (Sani Mu'azu), again without a condom. Ekene (Okezie Morro), a close friend to Femi organizes a party, with the help of Sade (Tiwa Savage), a wealthy club (Badoo) owner, and he invites his girlfriend, Foye (Maria Okanrende), an on-air personality and a friend to Sophie, to be the DJ. Sophie's younger sister, Princess (Sharon Ezeamaka) visits her from the village, but Sophie sends her back almost immediately. However, Princess instead of going back to the village decides to squat with David (Efa Iwara), a medical student she met earlier in the school; this development doesn't go down well with David's hostile roommate, Tobi (Timini Egbuson). Ekene discovers that Femi was once involved with Foye, and he visits Sophie in anger; Sophie has also had a bad day with her lecturer earlier and they both ended up having unprotected casual sex. At Badoo, Foye is a bit clumsy at her first major DJ event, and Femi urges her on; a fight eventually ensues between Femi and Ekene at the party. Femi is seen getting an antiretroviral drug at a clinic, as well as Solomon's driver, Osaro (Kachi Nnochiri); Osaro gives the drug to Solomon in the car.
11	2	"Shine Eye"	Biyi Bandele	Kemi Adesoye	8 December 2013	ShugaNaija Ep2
Sophie asks Malaika (Leonora Okine) to help her with her assignment, after the deal with one of her runs doesn't pull through. This leads to Malaika arriving home late, making her violent husband, Nii (Chris Attoh), who's against her friendship with Sophie, suspicious of her. Femi gets to explain to Ekene that he and Foye happened before he travelled to Kenya. Sophie finds some pills at Solomon's and confirms it to be HIV antiretroviral pills. She informs Ekene about it, and the need for both of them to go for a test. This causes Ekene to be disorganized and he disconnects himself from everybody else. Foye seems to still have feelings for Femi and she tries to get closer with him, but Femi is distant.
12	3	"It's Testing, Testing"	Biyi Bandele	Kemi Adesoye	15 December 2013	ShugaNaija Ep3
Sophie and Ekene HIV test results turn out negative, but they are advised to come for another test after their window period of three months. Sophie insists that she's not having sex with Solomon anymore without a condom, despite his low viral load; Solomon breaks up with her as a result. Tobi starts being homely towards Princess, after she buys him a new school bag. Sade has a son, Weki (Olumide Oworu); he is HIV positive, and is a close friend to Bikiya (Owumi Ugbeye), Solomon's daughter. Sade allows her son to attend Badoo, together with Bikiya. Nii calls off a date with Malaika, and she decides to go with Sophie to Badoo. Princess meets up with Solomon at Badoo, where Solomon also sees his daughter with Weki and warns him off his daughter. Nii, who has escorted his boss, Solomon to Badoo sees Malaika; he drives her home and beats her up. Foye discovers about Ekene's escapade with Sophie, and the possibility of her contracting HIV.
13	4	"Betrayed"	Biyi Bandele	Kemi Adesoye	22 December 2013	ShugaNaija Ep4
Foye stops relating with Sophie and Ekene, while Princess starts going out with Solomon as a friend, and starts a relationship with Tobi. Sophie takes Malaika to get on a contraceptive pill, after her husband, Nii insists on having children against Malaika's will. Sade starts to get uncomfortable with the closeness of Weki and Bikiya. Foye tests negative to HIV - she kisses Femi and tries to make out with Femi, but he withdraws again, confessing to her that he's HIV positive; she leaves immediately and distants herself from Femi as well. It is revealed that Sade adopted Weki, after he tries to tell her to stop being overprotective of him. Nii discovers Malaika's contraceptive pills and beats her up once more.
14	5	"Jailer"	Biyi Bandele	Kemi Adesoye	29 December 2013	ShugaNaija Ep5
Leo (Nick Mutuma), Femi's friend from Nairobi visits him and tries to help out with his relationship. Weki, whose midterm report shows a failing performance, bunks school and tries to travel to Port Harcourt to attend a football academy, a dream which Sade has always been against - Bikiya calls and joins at the airport. Malaika gets pregnant, but Sophie takes her for an illegal abortion, leading to complications. Foye gets back with Femi and asks for patience, while Sophie seems to develop feelings for Ekene.
15	6	"Rising Hope"	Biyi Bandele	Kemi Adesoye	5 January 2014	ShugaNaija Ep6
Nii finds out that Malaika tried to abort their baby and grounds her as a result. Weki confesses to Bikiya at the airport that he was born with HIV, and they both eventually return home. Princess, with the help of Solomon gets a modelling job with a top modelling agency; Tobi is strongly against Princess' relationship with Solomon, concerned that he would want something in return from her eventually. Sophie discovers that her sister, Princess didn't go back to the Village, and that David and Tobi has been harbouring her; Sophie intends to send Princess back to the village the next day, but eventually changes her mind and allows Princess to stay in her hostel for the meantime. Sade permits her son to attend a football academy in Lagos.
16	7	"Three Month Window"	Biyi Bandele	Kemi Adesoye	12 January 2014	ShugaNaija Ep7
Sophie suspects Princess' extravagant lifestyle and warns her about how grave the consequence of whatever she's doing maybe. Ekene and Sophie's HIV test results after 3 months turn out negative. Femi makes Sade realize that Weki is now a man, and that she needs to stop being overprotective of him. Princess eventually has sex with Solomon.
17	8	"Kasala"	Biyi Bandele	Kemi Adesoye	19 January 2014	ShugaNaija Ep8
Sophie finds out from Tobi that Princess is involved with Solomon; Sophie immediately goes to Solomon's hotel to pick up Princess and get her tested for HIV. Princess however tests positive to the virus. Malaika acts rudely to Sophie after bumping into her at the mall, telling Sophie not to mess up her life like she's done with hers. Malaika also for the first time talks back at Nii and leaves his presence at the mall; driving Nii's car home in anger, she knocks Nii down as he comes out of the mall. Foye gets back along with Sophie after meeting her at Badoo. Tobi goes to Badoo to attack Solomon, leading to Solomon's assistant, Osaro firing a gun at him, which hits Sophie instead.
