= Adebukola Oladipupo =

Nigerian actress (born 1994)

Bukola Oladipupo
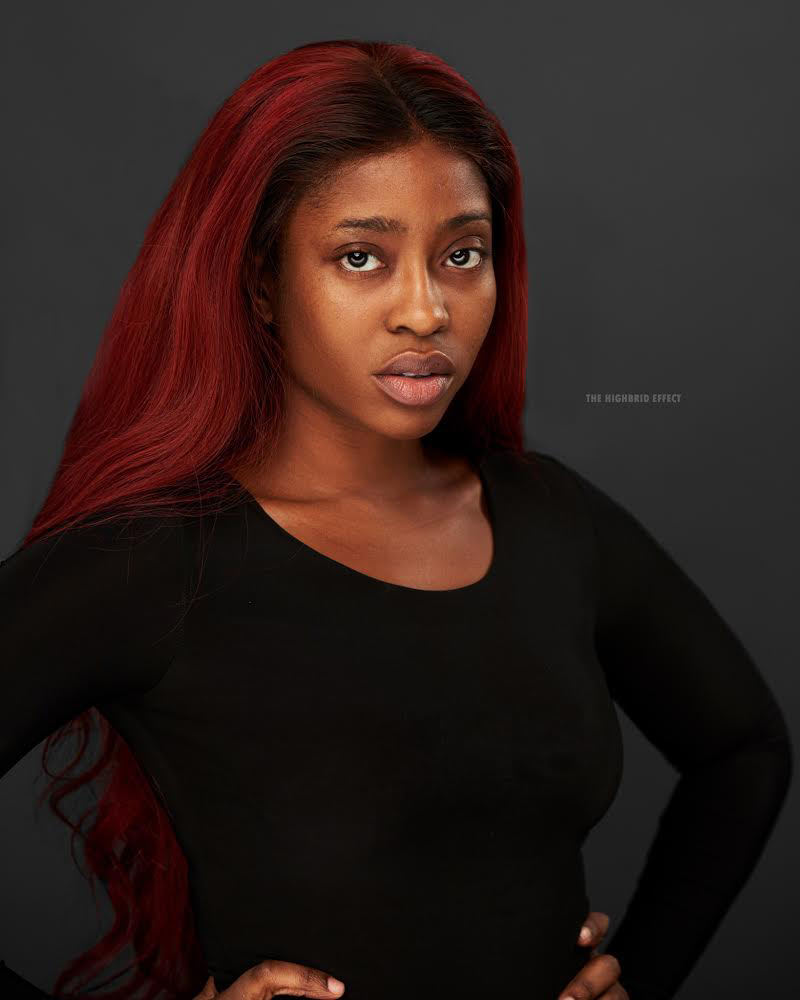
- Born: Adebukola Oladipupo; May 23, 1994 (age 31); London
- Education: Covenant University
- Occupation: Actress

Adebukola Oladipupo or Bukola Oladipupo (born May 23, 1994) is a Nigerian Actor who debuted on MTV Shuga.

== Life ==
Oladipupo was born in London and educated in Lagos. She has two siblings. Oladipupo had her primary education in Bellina Nursery and Primary School Akoka, Lagos. She also attended Babcock High School and Caleb International School for her secondary education. She studied Management Information Systems at Covenant University and also studied drama in other courses. Oladipupo inspiration to go into acting came when she was still an undergraduate at Covenant University during a church service when the pastor told them to turn their talent into skills.

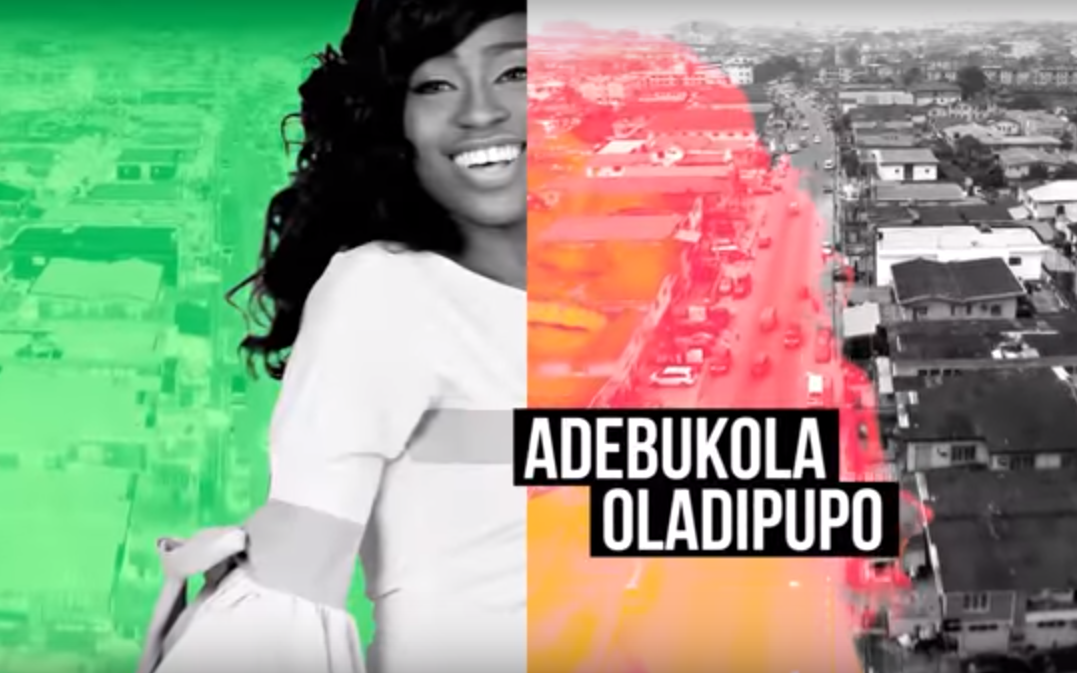
featuring in MTV Shuga

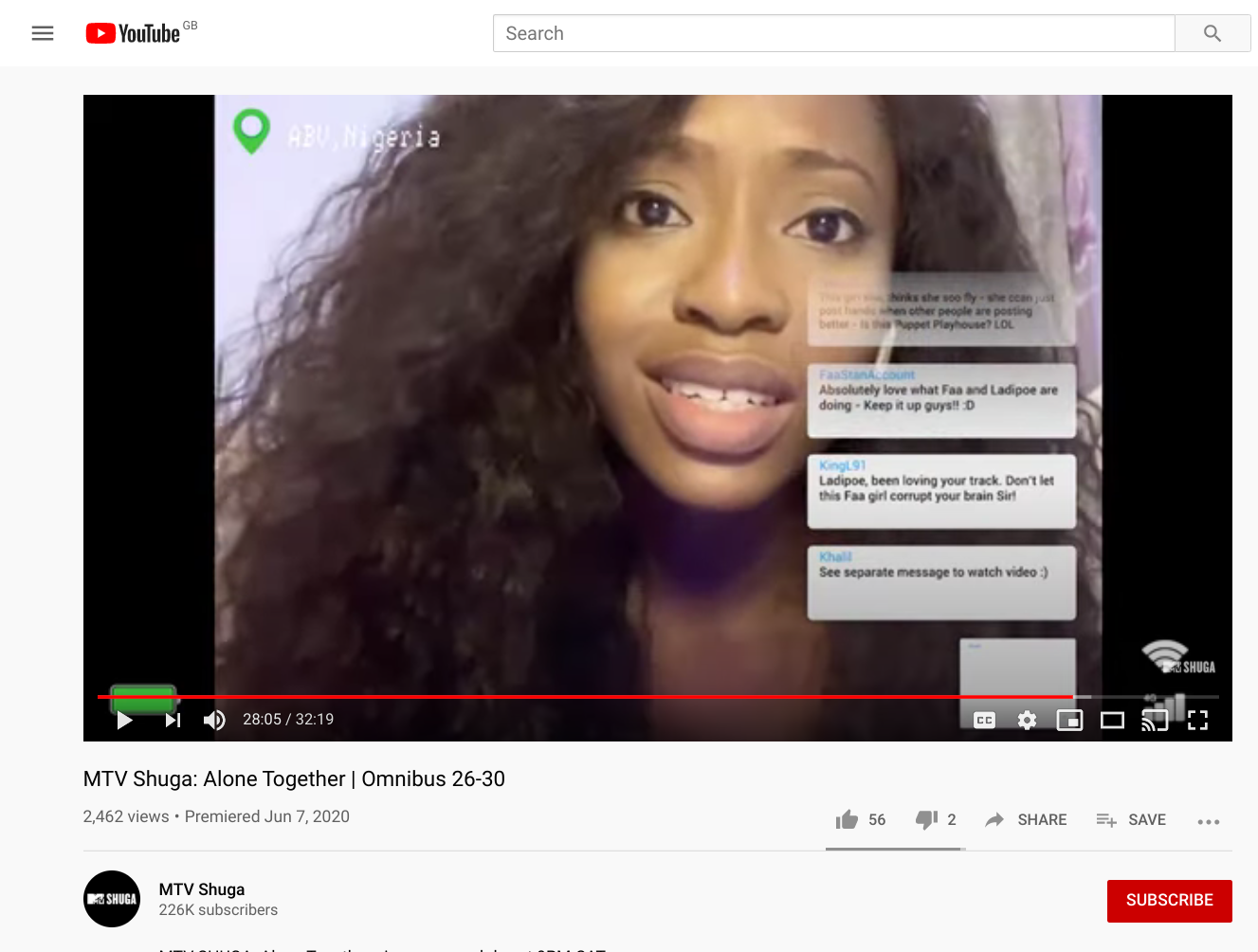
As "Faa" talking online in June 2020, filmed by herself as part of MTV Shuga

She successfully auditioned for MTV Shuga in 2015 where she was given what became the continuing role of "Faa". She puts her success down to the media mogul Mo Abudu who taught her to have self-belief. In 2015 she appeared in the first season of Indigo, Inevitable and The Other Me. In 2017 she appeared in the film Missing as the secretary playing herself.

Oladipupo was still in MTV Shuga as the character "Faa" when it went into a nightly mini series titled MTV Shuga Alone Together highlighting the problems of Coronavirus in April 2020. The show was broadcast for 60 nights and its backers include the World Health Organization. The series was based in Nigeria, South Africa, Kenya and Côte d'Ivoire and the story was explained with on-line conversations between the characters. All of the filming was done by the actors themselves who include Jemima Osunde, Lerato Walaza, Sthandiwe Kgoroge, Uzoamaka Aniunoh and Mohau Cele. Good

== Filmography ==
=== Films ===
Year	Title	Role	Notes	Ref
2016	The Other me	Sharon	Short film	
2017	Hakkunde	Joke	Comedy / Drama	
2017	You Me Maybe			
2018	In Sickness and Health	Amaka	Drama	
2018	Moms at War			
2019	Oloture	Beauty	Netflix original	
2021	Juju Stories	Chinwe	In the Suffer The Witch segment	
2024	Òlòtūré: The Journey	Beauty		

=== TV shows ===
Year	Title	Role	Notes	Ref
2015–2019	MTV Shuga	Faa	18 episodes	
2016	This Is It	Folake		
	Phases		Ndani TV series	
2018	The Men's Club	Tiara	RedTV series	
2020	Lara of Lagos	Tessie		
2018–2019	Forbidden	Doyin Doregos	Africa Magic original	

== See also ==
- List of Nigerian actresses
