= Shuga season 6 =

Nigerian television series

Shuga Naija is an MTV series that highlights the lifestyle of youths from different backgrounds and education on Sex and Sexual Transmitted Disease, Health among others. The sixth season of the MTV Shuga Naija is set in metropolitan area of Lagos where people from different part of the area living as residents and some for business and employment purposes. This interesting new season comes with a lot of complications, friendship ties about to broken, families about to tier down due to secrets. The season primarily focus on educating especially young people on Sex Education, Family Planning, Contraception, HIV prevention among others. MTV Shuga is produced by produced by award-winning writer/filmmaker Chris Ihidero, and Emma Uduma of SMAT Media.

== Overview ==
The MTV Shuga Season 6 premiered on February 22, 2018 at FilmHouse IMAX Cinema, Lekki.The cast features Timini Egubson, Jemima Osunde, Rahama Sadau, Adebukola Oladipupo, Abayomi Alvin, and many new faces and with cameo performances from YCee.

Shuga Naija is regarded as Africa's most viewed youth series since its inception in 2019. New faces in season 6 are Ozzy Agu, Rahama Sadau, Amal Umar, Yakubu Muhammad, Bolanle Olukanni, Funlola Aofiyebi-Raimi, Nobert Young, Bukola Oladipupo, Alvin Abayomi, and Helena Nelson along with many more new faces. Directors of the MTV series season 6 include award-winning directors, Tolulope Ajayi, Ishaya Bako and Tope Oshin were also revealed as the directors.

MTV SHUGA Season 6 features a plot that portrays the vibrant streets, eclectic clubs along with the bustle of Lagos metropolis along with the contrasting Northern states of Kano and Kaduna regions.

== Cast ==
This new season features the following 26 cast members;

- Timini Egbuson as Tobi,
- Jemima Osunde as Leila,
- Sharon Ezeamaka as Princess
- Olumide Oworu as Weki.
- Adebukola Oladipupo as Faa
- Yakubu Mohammed as Mahmud
- Ozzy Agu
- Rahama Sadau as Yasmin
- Funlola Aofiyebi
- Nobert Young
- Amal Umar as Hadiza
- Helena Johnson as Diana
- Ladani Sulaiman
- Shawn Faqua
- Richard Mofe Damijo as Angel
- Funlola Aofiyebi as Mrs. Olotu
- Osas Ighodaro as Sergeant Iyanu
- Funso Adeolu as Inspector Olotu
- Mosses Akerele as Khalil
- Ruby Akubueze as Frances
- Yomi Alvin as Ebisinde
- Uzoamaka Aniunoh as Cynthia
- Rakiah Attah as Mahmud's mother
- Omowunmi Dada as Barbie
- Segun Dada as Bada
- Emeka Darlington as Jasper
- Riyo David as Jibril
- Omozele Gabriel as Maryam
- Chimezie Imo as Shina
- Sharon Jatto as Simi
- Emeka Nwagbaraocha as Chinedu
- Taiwo Ola as Mo
- Prince Tunde Sado as Mr. Efosa
- Tomiwa Tegbe as Wasiu
