= Palesa =

Palesa is a feminine given name meaning "flower". Notable people with the name include:

- Beverley Palesa Ditsie (born 1971), South African lesbian activist, artist, and filmmaker
- Palesa Madisakwane, South African actress
- Palesa Jacqui Mofokeng (born 1972), South African beauty queen (Miss South Africa 1993)
- Palesa Mokubung, South African fashion designer
- Palesa Molefe, Motswana beauty queen (Miss Botswana 2021)
