= Sthandiwe Kgoroge =

South Africa actress (born 1972)

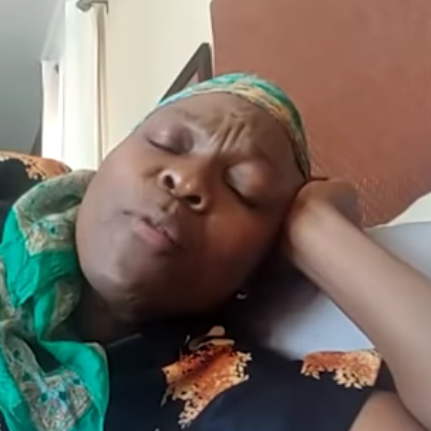
- In 2020 as Aunt Nomalenga in MTV Shuga
- Born: Sithandiwe Msomi; 4 February 1972 (age 54)
- Education: University of Natal
- Occupation: Actress
- Spouse: Tony Kgoroge

Sthandiwe Msomi Kgoroge (born 4 February 1972) is a South African actor who appeared in Generations, series 5 and 7 of MTV Shuga, the mini-series MTV Shuga Alone Together, and the first series of Yizo Yizo.

== Life ==
Kgoroge lived in Edmonton, Canada, from age five to ten. She was educated at the University of Natal, where she graduated in drama. She has said that she struggled with her self image, but eventually realised that her dark complexion was exactly right.

She appeared in the first series of Yizo Yizo as Zoe Cele in 1999. She was recognised as the best supporting actress in a drama series for this role, and she received an Avanti Award. She played twins in Generations from 1999 to 2005.

She appeared in series 5 of MTV Shuga as Aunt Nomalenga and returned to the role for the mini-series MTV Shuga Alone Together, which highlighted the problems of the COVID-19 pandemic, on 20 April 2020. During the series the characters talk to each other about life during the lockdown. The mini-series is scheduled for 60 nights and its backers include the "Every Woman Every Child". The series is based in Nigeria, South Africa, Kenya and Cote D’Ivoire. All of the filming is done by the actors themselves, who include Lerato Walaza, Mamarumo Marokane and Mohau Cele.

== Personal life ==
Sthandiwe also known as "Sta" is married to actor Tony Kgoroge, and they have children. When faced with debt recovery in 2018, he asked that people ignore his and his wife's Instagram pages, saying they were only "ordinary citizens". He was facing a loss of earnings because he was not being paid for repeat fees by some broadcasters. Sta loves her church family and serves the Lord.

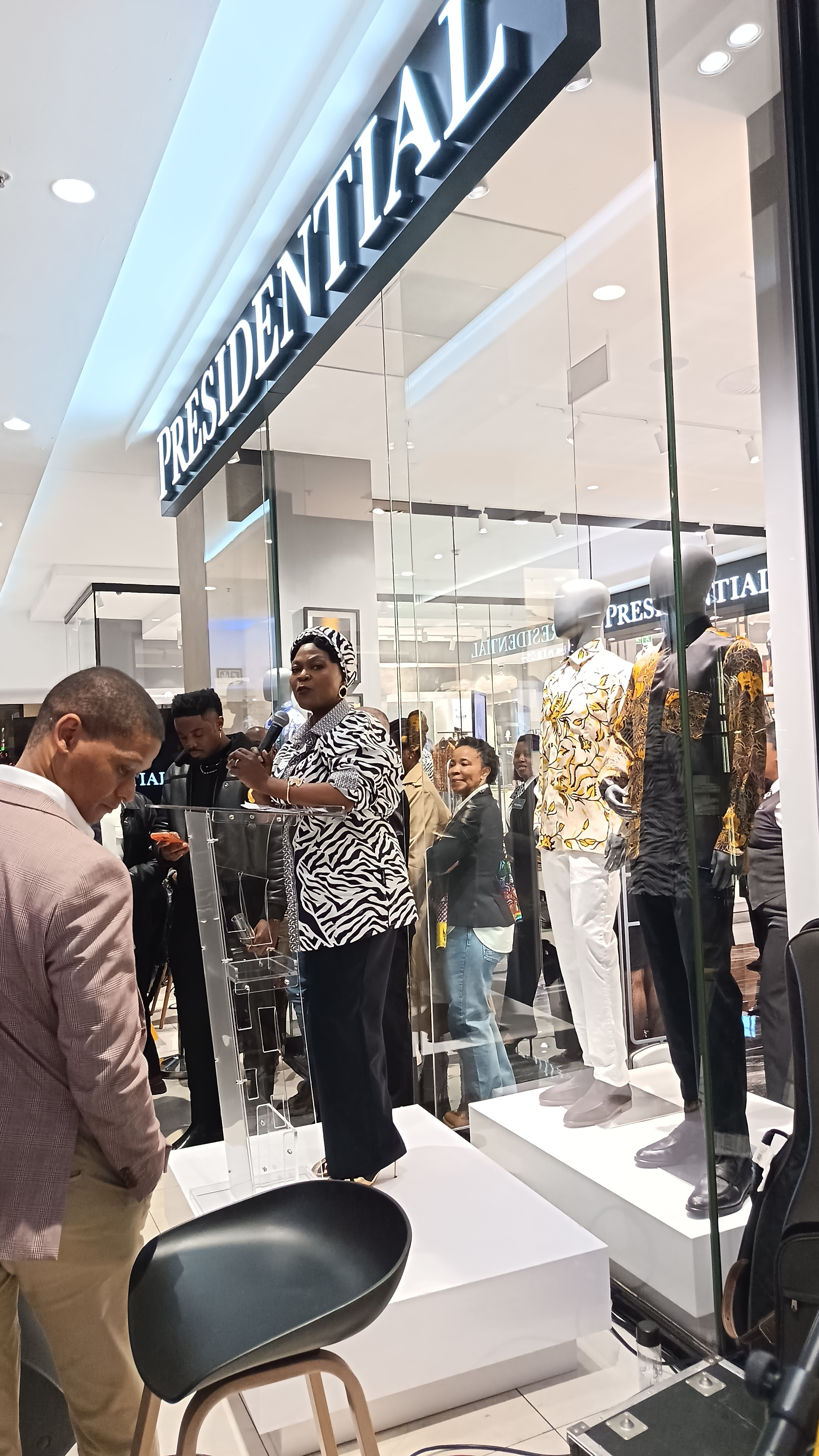
Sthandiwe Kgoroge at the opening of the Presidential Shirt Emporium, Nelson Mandela Square, Sandton City, Johannesburg, Gauteng.

== Fashion career ==
Sthandiwe has been said to be "always ahead of the curve, she’s been recycling and upcycling secondhand and vintage clothes for many years. Her love of clothes with a strong story line led her to starting The Vintage Market. In collaboration with about twenty other vintage lovers, she offers a wide range of clothes, all in good condition for independent-minded fashion lovers and keeping these clothes out of the landfills".""The one thing they (my children) have taught me is that I am great... and that I am hilarious. They think I'm so cool. When I drop them off at school, in my Simon and Mary hats and clothes that I have designed, they want me to come and greet their friends," she said." In 2008 Five Roses sponsored the designs of Mantsho (Palesa Mokubung); Hermanna Rush (Nicole Dersley and Jacqueline Corfield) and Miss Scarlet (Jacky Lucking). Designers were also commissioned to design dresses for well-known celebrities, including Sthandiwe Kgoroge.
