= Cake (2022 film) =

- Directed by: Prosper Edesiri
- Produced by: Tongryang Pantu
- Starring: Saskay, Patience Ozokwor, Emmanuel “Koloman” Jibunor and Philip Asaya
- Production companies: Natives Filmworks and Michelangelo Productions
- Release date: 25 February 2022
- Country: Nigeria
- Language: English

The Cake is a Nollywood romantic comedy directed by Prosper Edesiri and produced by Tongryang Pantu. It stars Saskay, Patience Ozokwor, Emmanuel Jibunor, Philip Asaya, Tope Tedela, Sophie Alakija, and Folu Storms, with Dotun Olakunri as the Executive Producer and also Steve Gukas, Co-producer of the film. It was released through Natives Filmworks and Michelangelo Productions on the Natives Family Friendly Films Project Production Company. The film was distributed through FilmOne Production and was theatrically released on 25 February 2022.

== Cast ==
- Saskay
- Patience Ozokwor as Tomiwa's Mum
- Emmanuel Jibunor
- Philip Asaya as Theo Maduka
- Tope Tedela as Tomiwa Akinlolu
- Sophie Alakija as Chalya Walshak
- Folu Storms as Mfon
