= Pinetown Girls' High School =

Coordinates: 29°49′11″S 30°52′25″E

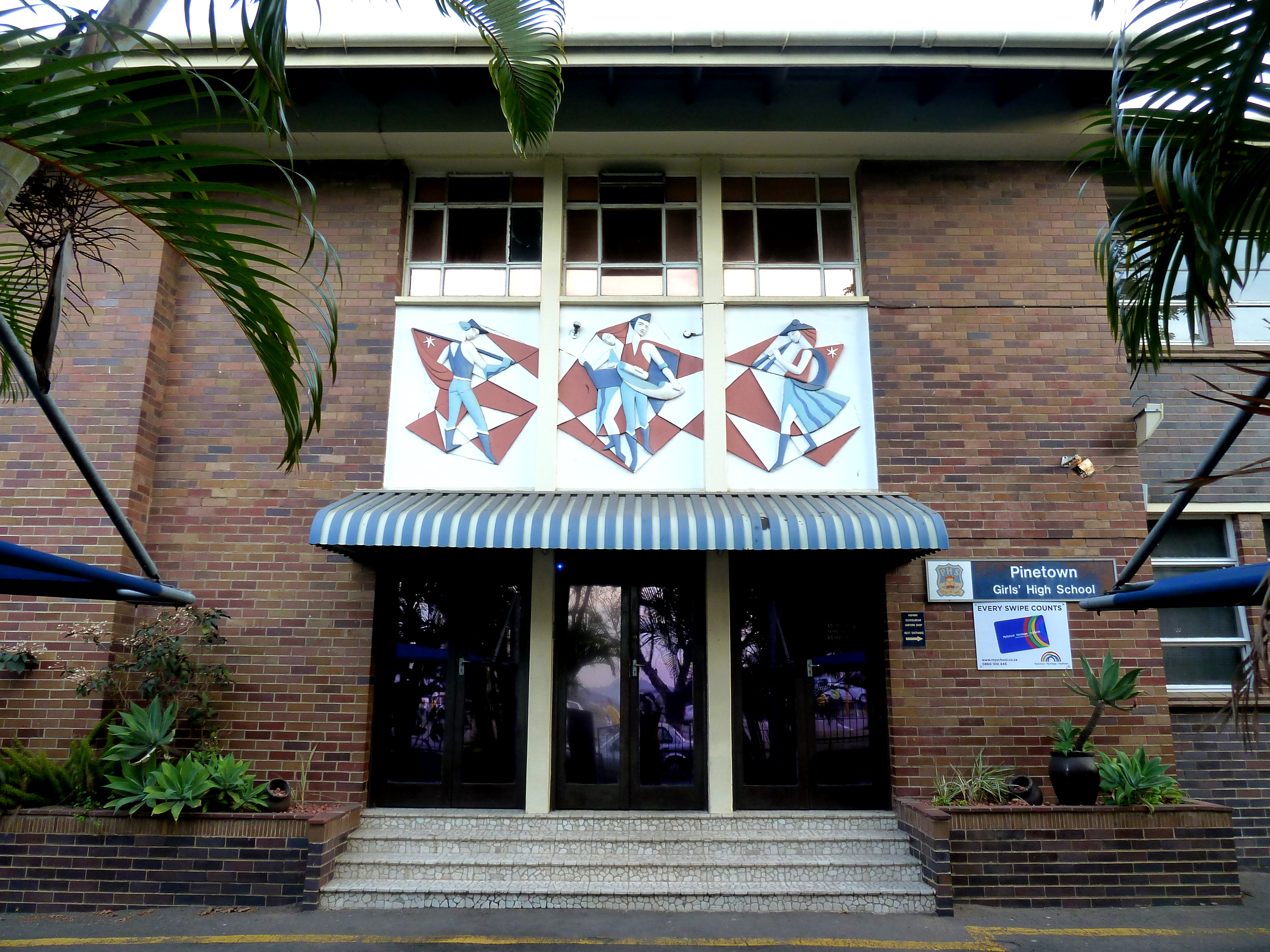
Main entrance of Pinetown Girls' High School in Josiah Gumede Road, Pinetown

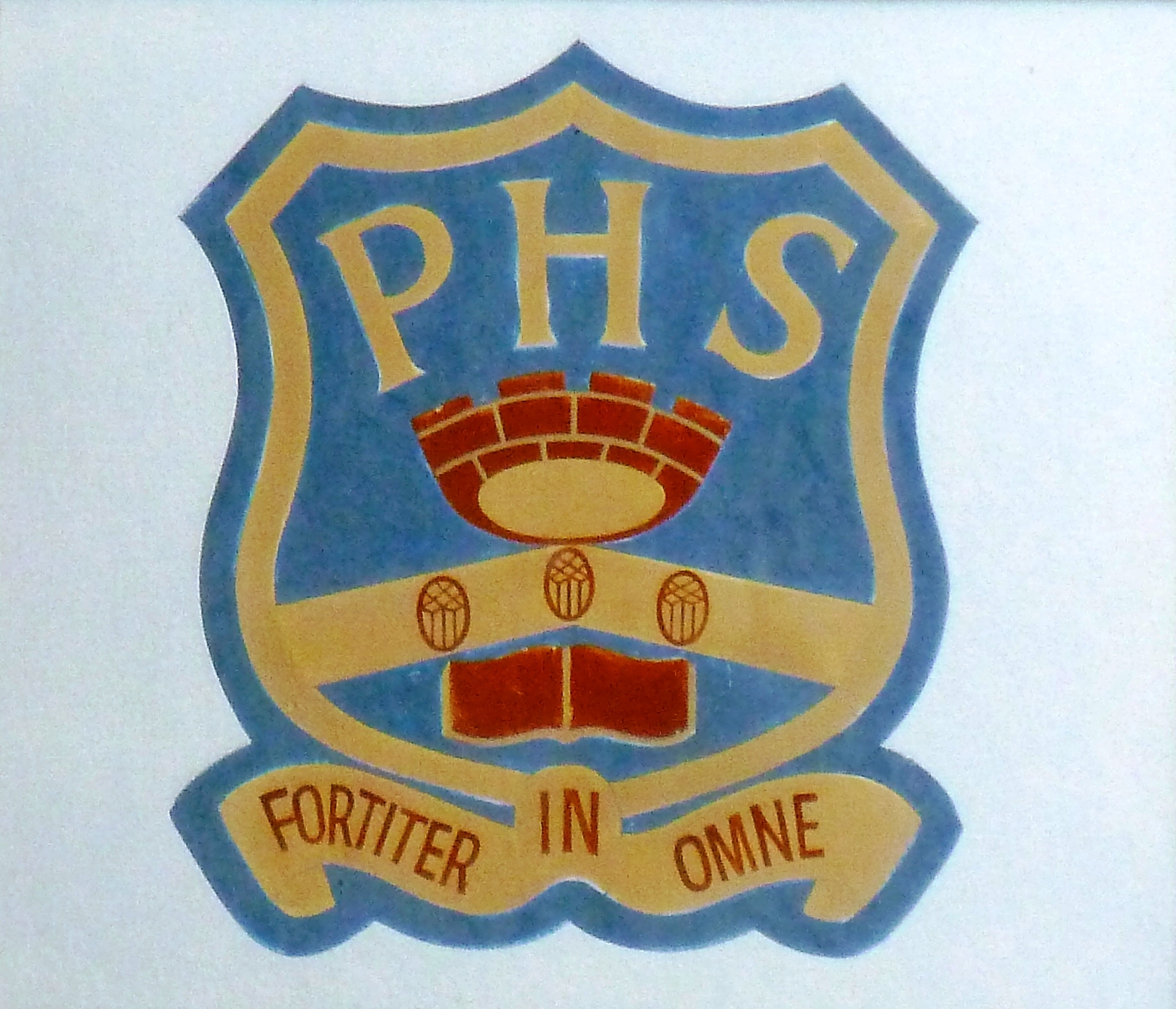
Fortiter in Omne Bravely Into All Things

Pinetown Girls' High School is a public school for girls in Josiah Gumede road (i.e. Old Main Road), Pinetown, KwaZulu-Natal, South Africa. It was founded in 1955 as Pinetown High School, a co-educational school, at its current site. On 1 January 1978, the boys were split off into Pinetown Boys' High School. The school changed its name to Pinetown Girls' High School, but kept the original school badge and school motto, Fortiter in Omne, which is Latin, and means Bravely Into All Things. The boys' and girls' school are located in close proximity to each other. The two schools also host drama shows annually together, as a joint event.

== Badge ==
The badge includes the letters PHS (Pinetown High School), which are also used by its brother school, Pinetown Boys' High School, a crown which represents the period when South Africa was part of the British Empire, three pine cones honouring Sir Benjamin Pine, who was instrumental in developing Pinetown when it was still a village, and a book which stands for education.

== Notable alumnae ==
- Pearl Thusi, actress, model, television host, and radio personality
- Samke Makhoba, actress
- Zanda Zakuza, singer
- Kwezi Ndlovu, actress
- Minnie Ntuli, radio presenter, actress, TV personality
- Mbalenhle Mavimbela, actress
