= My Wife & I =

2017 Nigerian drama thriller film

- Directed by: Bunmi Ajakaiye
- Written by: Chinaza Onuzo
- Starring: Ramsey Nouah; Omoni Oboli; Dorcas Shola-Fapson; Bimbo Ademoye; Lilian Afegbai
- Edited by: Victoria Akujobi
- Production companies: FilmOne Production; InkBlot Productions
- Distributed by: FilmOne Production
- Release dates: 25 August 2017 (Nigeria); 15 September 2017 (South Africa)
- Running time: 100 minutes
- Countries: Nigeria; South Africa
- Language: English
- Box office: $14,087

My Wife & I is a 2017 Nigerian family comedy film directed by Bunmi Ajakaiye and co-produced by Moses Babatope, Kene Mkparu, Kene Okwuosa, Zulu Onuekwusi, Chinaza Onuzo and Isioma Osaje. The film stars Ramsey Nouah and Omoni Oboli, with Dorcas Shola-Fapson, Bimbo Ademoye, and Lilian Afegbai in supporting roles. The story follows Toyosi and Ebere, an unhappily married couple on the brink of divorce, whose relationship takes an unexpected turn after a visit from a pastor results in them swapping bodies.

The film premiered on 25 August 2017 and made its television debut in Taiwan on 23 December 2018. It received positive reviews from critics and was screened internationally.

== Cast ==
- Ramsey Nouah as Toyosi Akinyele
- Omoni Oboli as Ebere Akinyele
- Dorcas Shola-Fapson as Jumoke Fashanu
- Bimbo Ademoye as Georgina
- Lilian Afegbai as Yetunde Akinyele
- Adeolu Adefarasin as Idris Joda
- Rotimi Adelegan as Kehinde Martins
- Alex Ayalogu as Chukwudi Okadigbo
- Jumoke George as Aunty Ayo
- Joshua Johnson as Timi Salako
- Ngozi Nwosu as Bisi Akinyele
- Sambasa Nzeribe as Emeka Okadigbo
- Rachel Oniga as Uchenna Okadigbo
- Nnadozie Onyiriuka as Okey Akinyele
- Jemima Osunde as Ireti Akinyele
- Seyilaw as Pastor Theophilus
- Gloria Okafor as Dumebi
- Oribhabor Dickson as Spa Attendant
- Emeka Duru as Shoprite Inspector
- Chinonso Ejiogwu as Gateman
- Mgbanwa Franklin as Farm Inspector
- Bolanle Ninalowo as Husband
- Abimbola Craig as Wife
- Maryame Obiora as Debbie
- Praise Sam Ogan as Hot Waitress
- Wale Shabiolegbe as Aunty Ayo's Driver
