= Maria Okanrende =

Nigerian television and radio personality

- Born: London, England
- Education: Goldsmiths, University of London (B.A.)
- Occupations: Radio personality Television personality Actress
- Notable credit: The Morning Rush (The Beat FM)
- Website: mariaokan.com

Maria Okanrende is a Nigerian television and radio personality.

She co-hosts The Morning Rush on The Beat 99.9 FM. She previously hosted at Dropout UK, Hayes FM and worked as a production assistant at Global Radio.

== Early life and education ==
Okanrende grew up with her parents and her younger sister in London. She graduated from Goldsmiths, University of London with a B.A. honours in English Literature.

== Career ==
Okanrende visited Nigeria at least once a year while she lived in London. After spending some time in Lagos, she decided to permanently move to Nigeria after she got a job in Lagos whilst on vacation.

She auditioned for the Beat FM in 2012 and began co-hosting The Morning Rush show.

She made her acting debut on the season 3 of MTV's Shuga.

She also hosts a weblog, Maria's Matters!, which airs on her website and YouTube. On the vlog, she's often seen interviewing celebrities on lifestyle and fashion.

== Filmography ==
=== Television ===
Year	Title	Role	Director	Notes
2013–2014	Shuga (Season 3)	Foye	Various	Recurring role, Season 3 (8 episodes)
