= The Lost Café =

2018 Nigerian drama film

- Directed by: Kenneth Gyang
- Written by: Ifesinachi Okoli-Okpagu; Regina Idu Udalor
- Story by: Emil Garuba
- Produced by: Regina Idu Udalor
- Starring: Tunde Aladese; Anders Lidin Hansen; Jenny Bonden; Tayo Citadel; Anita Daniels
- Cinematography: Baba Agba; Ifeanyi Iloduba
- Edited by: Johnson E. Awolola
- Production companies: Cinema Kpatakpata; New Dawn Entertainment; Peridot Entertainment
- Distributed by: Juno Films
- Release date: 30 July 2018
- Running time: 96 minutes
- Countries: Nigeria; Norway
- Languages: English; Norwegian

The Lost Café is a 2018 Nigerian drama film directed by Kenneth Gyang and produced by Regina Idu Udalor. The film stars Tunde Aladese and Anders Lidin Hansen with Jenny Bonden, Tayo Citadel, and Anita Daniels in supporting roles. The film tells the story about a Nigerian graduate student who moved to Norway to study to become a film director, where she met an elderly man with secrets.

The film was released through Netflix on 31 July 2020 which is the Netflix debut for Regina Udalor. The film received mostly positive critics acclaim and screened worldwide. In 2018 at the Africa Movie Academy Awards, the film was nominated for seven awards: Achievement in Screenplay, Best Actress in a Leading Role, Best Director, Best Film, Best Nigerian Film, Achievement in Cinematography and Achievement in Sound.

== Cast ==
- Tunde Aladese as Ose
- Anders Lidin Hansen as Eirik
- Jenny Bonden as Sunniva
- Tayo Citadel as Young Thorkell
- Anita Daniels as Dora
- Silje Drengsrud as Lene
- Belinda Effah as Efe
- Ingrid Lill Høgtun as Sunniva's Mother
- Torbjørn Jensen as Coffee Shop Owner / Librarian
- Terje Bruun Lien as Old Man Thorkell (as Terje Lien)
- Marianne Lindbeck as Young Thorkell's Girlfriend
- Anne Njemanze as Ose's Mother
- Carla Nyquist as Lecturer
- Thorkell August Ottarsson as Hod
- Omatta Udalor as Hakeem
