= Muskoka Initiative =

The Muskoka Initiative on Maternal, Newborn and Child Health is a funding initiative announced at the 36th G8 summit which commits member nations to collectively spend an additional $5 billion between 2010 and 2015 to accelerate progress toward the achievement of Millennium Development Goals 4 and 5, the reduction of maternal, infant and child mortality in developing countries. A second summit on Maternal, Newborn and Child Health was held in Toronto from May 28–30, 2014, in follow-up to the original 36th G8 summit.

== See also ==
- Global Strategy for Women's and Children's Health
