= Hotel Majestic (TV series) =

Nigerian telenovela

- Genre: Drama; telenovela
- Written by: Tunde Aladese
- Starring: Sadiq Daba; Gloria Young; Tina Mba; Oge Okoye; Bukky Ajayi; Anne Njemanze
- Country of origin: Nigeria
- Original language: English

Production
- Production locations: Lagos, Lagos State, Nigeria
- Production company: Mnet

Original release
- Network: Africa Magic
- Release: 5 January 2015

Hotel Majestic is a Nigerian telenovela drama series, starring Ivie Okujaye, Sadiq Daba, Oge Okoye and Bukky Ajayi. It began on Africa Magic on 5 January 2015.

== Guide ==
The writer for the series was Tunde Aladese. The series revolved around the quest to control an ancient family hotel and the consequences that follows with it. The final episode was shown in January 2016, with an event at InterContinental Hotel featuring special performances from Harrysong and YCEE amongst others.

== Cast ==
- Ivie Okujaye as Alero/Ivie
- Oge Okoye as Patricia
- David Jones David as Timi Emeni
- Kingsley Nwachukwu as Maja Emeni
- Akin Lewis as Honorable Edafe
- Demi Banwo as JoGo
- Theresa Edem as Isioma
- 'Muyiwa Odukale as Seargent Tony
- Timi Richards as Abdul Asemota
- Kocabelle Guemini as Ese

== Reception ==
The Nollywood Review, praised the storyline, African setting, acting, plot and props. It particularly felt usage of pidgin English was well appreciated and added to the originality of the film. However, it downplayed the acting of "Aunty Ronke" explaining that she didn't add enough life to her role as a mother and was not convincing enough. Pulse Nigeria called it a "suspense filled series", that was the rave of the moment. This Day Newspaper espoused that the casting and screenplay were fundamental to the success of the series.

== Awards and nominations ==
| Year | Award | Category | Result | Ref |
|---|---|---|---|---|
| 2014 | Best of Nollywood Awards | Best TV Series of the Year | Nominated | |
