= Chris Ihidero =

Nigerian filmmaker (born 1976)

- Born: Christopher Olugbenga Ihidero; 19 March 1976 (age 50); Lagos State, Nigeria
- Citizenship: Nigerian
- Education: Lagos State University, University of Ibadan
- Occupations: Filmmaker; journalist; broadcaster
- Notable work: Fuji House of Commotion

Chris Ihidero (born 19 March 1976) is a Nigerian filmmaker. He is the head writer and story editor on M-Net's television drama Hush.

== Early life and education ==
Ihidero was born on 19 March 1976. He holds bachelor's and master's degrees in Literature-in-English from Lagos State University and the University of Ibadan.

== Career ==
He has worked as a theatre artist, broadcaster, newspaper columnist, magazine editor and university lecturer. From 2005, he taught at the School of Part-time Studies, Lagos State University.

In 2007, he joined Amaka Igwe Studios, as a trainee director. From there, he rose to become the chief operating officer in 2010. He has also worked as Director of Studies at the Centre for Excellence in Film and Media Studies in Lagos, which was the research and training arm of Amaka Igwe Studios.

In September 2013, Ihidero became the chief operating officer of Q Entertainment Network.

In September 2014, he launched PinPoint Media, a 360 media and production company and parent company of Lagos Film Academy(LFA), ScreenKraft and True Nollywood Stories (TNS).

In December 2014, he launched True Nollywood Stories, as a platform for news, views, reviews, opinion and general information around Nigeria's film industry.

In 2015, he was a producer on Shuga Series 4.

Ihidero has also been involved in training Nigerians in storytelling through programmes such as Story Story and TV Writing Masterclass.

== Journalism ==
Ihidero has chaired the editorial board of Nigerian Entertainment Today (NET) since 2012.

He was the editor of MADE, a men's lifestyle magazine from 2007 to 2009.

He has also worked as a newspaper columnist, for The Guardian, TheNET and TNS for over ten years.

== Film and television career ==
Ihidero has directed over 100 hours of television drama. He has made two short films, including Big Daddy, a film about rape, which premiered at the Silverbird Cinemas in Lagos in December 2011. At over 500,000 views, it has become the most watched short film in Nigeria. The film won the Special Jury Award and Best Editing Award at the 2012 In-Short International Film Festival in Lagos.

In 2015, Ihidero directed It Happened to Me, a short film written by Amaka Igwe. It premiered at UNESCO Headquarters in Paris in November 2013, and in Nigeria in April 2015. The film was commissioned as part of the United Nations Programme on HIV/AIDS (UNAIDS) aimed at using culturally appropriate strategies to strengthen youth involvement with HIV/AIDS prevention activities in Nigeria.

== Filmography ==
- Fuji House of Commotion – Director, television comedy series (over 52 episodes; from September 2008)
- Now We Are Married – Director, television drama series (18 episodes; 2009–2012)
- VIP – Director, television thriller series (15 episodes; 2010)
- Big Daddy – Writer, director, and producer, short film (2011)
- It Happened to Me – Director, short film (2013)
- Shuga – Producer, television series (2014)
- Hush – Head writer and story editor, M-Net television series
- Forbidden – Head writer and showrunner, M-Net television series

== See also ==
- List of Nigerian film producers
