= Leonora Okine =

Ghanaian actress

- Born: Leonora Okine; 11 July 1981 (age 44); Accra, Ghana
- Education: St Mary's Senior High School; University of Ghana; Accra Business School; Ghana Institute of Management and Public Administration
- Occupations: Actress, business strategist, philanthropist
- Known for: Tinsel (TV series), MTV Shuga
- Awards: Golden Movie Award Africa (GMAA), 2015.

Leonora Okine (born July 11, 1981) is a Ghanaian actress, philanthropist and business strategist.

== Personal life and education ==
Leonora was born in Accra, Ghana. She received her early education at Bishop Joel Primary and JHS. She is an alumna of St Mary's Senior High School, Accra, where she completed her secondary school education. She studied Biological Science at the University of Ghana, Legon, she furthered at Accra Business School where she earned an MBA in Project Management. She continued in 2007 to study Operations and Project Management at the Ghana Institute of Management and Public Administration.

== Acting career ==
Leonora's acting career started with a guest appearance in Ghanaian television series, Different Shades of Blue (2007). In 2012 she replaced Matilda Obaseki in the Nigerian award-winning TV Series, Tinsel (TV series), playing the role of Angela Dede. She played "Malaika" in seven episodes of MTV drama series, Shuga. She has starred in Marrying the Game, Kpians: The Feast of Souls, Love and War, In Line, Beautiful Monster, and Desperation.

== Filmography ==
=== Film ===
- Enemy of My Soul (2008)
- Beautiful Monster (2010)
- Insurgents (2011)
- Blood and Chocolate (2012)
- Love and War (2013) as Vivian
- Kpians: The Feast of Souls (2014) as Tricia
- In Line (2017) as Vanessa
- Wide Awake (2019)

=== Television ===
- Different Shades of Blue (2007) as Natasha
- Secrets (2009)
- Desperation (2009)
- Happy Family (2011)
- Tinsel (TV series) (2012)
- 5 Brides (2012)
- Echoes (2012)
- PEEP (2012)
- MTV Shuga (2013) as Malaika
- Married To The Game (2014) as Gloria Coker

== Recognition ==
Best Actress in TV Series category, Golden Movie Award Africa (GMAA), 2015.
