= Lagoon Secondary School, Lekki =

- Lekki, Lagos State; Nigeria

Information
- Established: 1995; 31 years ago
- Staff: c.100
- Gender: Girls
- Enrollment: c.950
- Website: www.lagoonschool.com.ng

The Lagoon School is a private all-girls primary and secondary school located in Lekki, in Lagos State, Nigeria. It has about 700 students in the secondary section and about 250 pupils in the primary section and 100 members of staff.

== History ==
The school was established in September 1995 in Surulere and later moved to Lekki.

== Mentoring Program ==
As part of the school activities, the school recently organized this program to assist their wards in area of Music and Art. The program is fashioned as an eye opener to the students and also to bring the curiosity about the world outside the four corners of the school.
