= Sharon Ezeamaka =

Nigerian actress and feminist

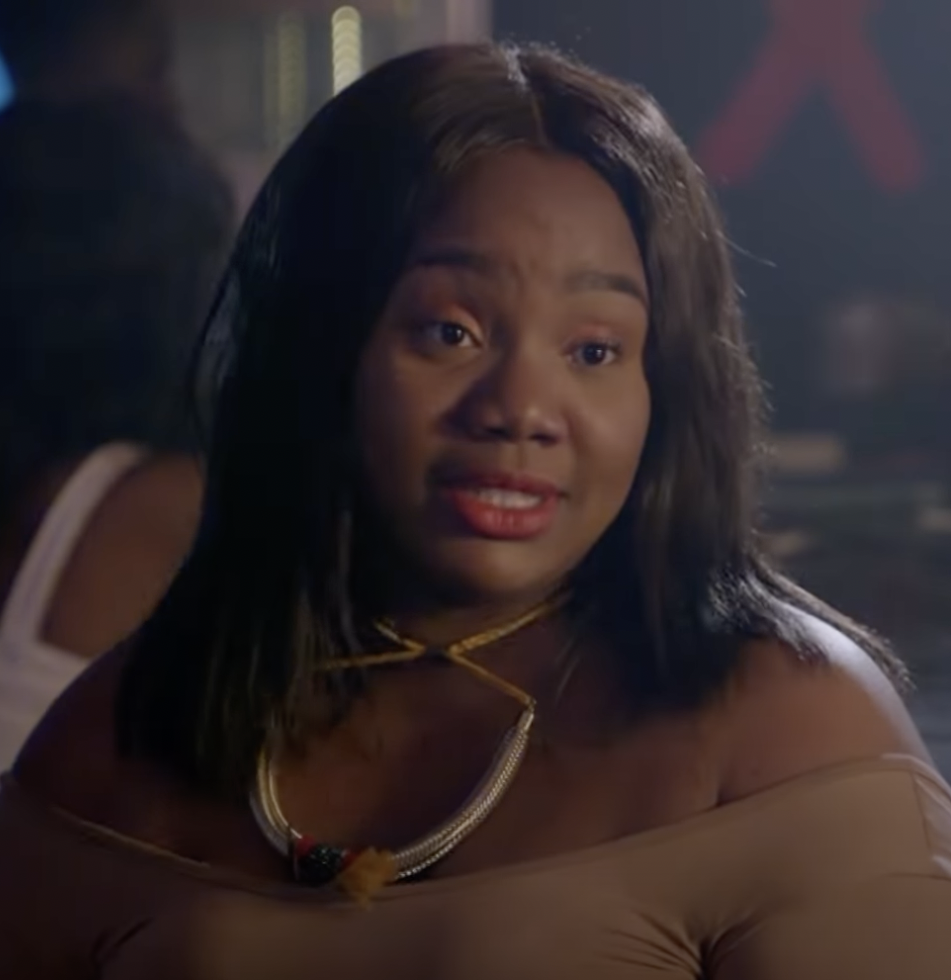
- Occupations: Actress; Model; Feminist; Film producer
- Years active: 1997–present
- Notable work: Television serials Shuga, Kala & Jamal, and Dorathy My Love
- Relatives: Thelma Ezeamaka (sister)

Sharon Chisom Ezeamaka is a Nigerian actress and a feminist. Starting as a child artist, she was in the television serials Shuga, Kala & Jamal, and Dorathy My Love.

Apart from acting, she is also a producer, model, and television personality.

== Personal life ==
Ezeamaka lamented in 2012, during an interview with Showtime Celebrity that people still treat her as a baby despite being 20 years old. She said, "I have been acting since I was 5, and even though I’m 20 now, people still see me as that little girl. So, I took a two-year break to do other things, get more mature, and explore other areas of the media. I worked in a fashion magazine for about a year, FAB magazine. After that, I took a break before I debuted on the M-net show, The Johnsons. On the Johnsons, I play a really young character who is fifteen". She stated that she does not have time for boys.

== Filmography ==
Year	Film	Role	Genre	Ref.
1999	Narrow Escape	child actress	Film	
2000	Dear Mother	child actress	Film	
2004	Little Angel		Home movie	
2004	Burning Desire		Home movie	
2004	Burning Desire 2		Home movie	
2005	Dorathy My Love		Home movie	
2005	Dorathy My Love 2		Home movie	
2007	Secrets of the Night		Home movie	
2007	Secrets of the Night 2		Home movie	
2016	Kala & Jamal	Bolade	TV series	
2013–18	Shuga	Princess	TV series	
