= Palesa Mokubung =

South African fashion designer

- Born: 1981 (age 44–45); Kroonstad, Free State, South Africa
- Citizenship: South African
- Education: Vanderbijlpark Technical College (BA)
- Occupations: Fashion designer, creative director, businesswoman
- Known for: Founder of Mantsho; First African designer to collaborate with H&M
- Title: Founder and Creative Director, Mantsho
- Children: 1
- Awards: Nominated, South African Art and Culture Award (2011); Nominated, Mercedes-Benz Award for South African Art and Culture (2009); Winner, 73rd Annual Fashion Forward International Thessaloniki Show (Greece); Fashion and Innovation Award, Mbokoko Women in the Arts Awards (2014)

Palesa Mokubung is a South African fashion designer. She is the founder and creative director of the Mantsho, a South African Fashion Label. She is the first African designer to collaborate with the Swedish fashion company H&M to create a collection.

== Early years and education ==
Mokubung was born in Kroonstad, Free State. In 2014 she graduated with a Bachelor of Arts degree in Fashion Design from Vanderbijlpark Technical College.

== Career ==
Mokubung completed her fashion schooling in 2000 and began working as an in-house designer at Stoned Cherrie, a local fashion brand. After working there for three years she left to enter a design competition, S’camto Groundbreakers. When she won the competition she travelled to New York and Mumbai for six months and there she showed her first solo range. She established the Mantsho label, which means black is beautiful, in 2004. In that same year, she designed her first solo collection, which was shown at the 8th annual South Africa Fashion Week. Her brand has featured on numerous runways including Greece, India, USA, Jamaica, Nigeria, Botswana and Senegal. In October 2018 she showed her collection at the BRICS show, along with designers from Brazil, Russia, India, and China.

== Personal life ==
She is a mother of one child.

== Awards and recognitions ==
- 2011 - Mokubung was nominated for South African Art and Culture Award
- 2009 - She was again nominated for the Mercedes-Benz Award for South African Art and Culture 2009 Fashion Design
- She won the 73rd Annual Fashion Forward International Thessaloniki Show held in Greece
- 2014 - She won a Fashion and Innovation Award at the Mbokoko Women in the Arts Awards
