= Mohau Cele =

South African actress

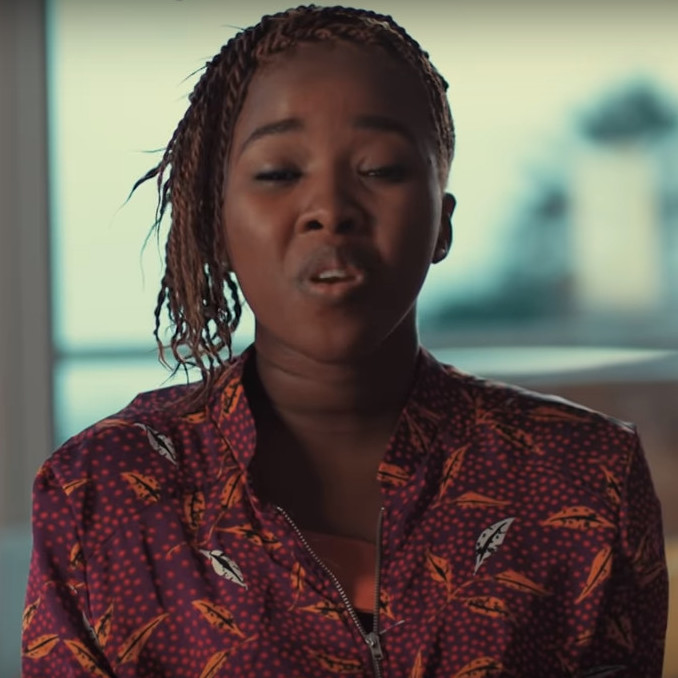
- Born: Mohau Mokoatle; 28 September 1991 (age 34); Matatiele, Eastern Cape, South Africa
- Education: University of the Witwatersrand
- Occupations: actress; singer
- Known for: playing Bongi in MTV Shuga

Mohau Mokoatle (née Cele) (born 28 September 1991) is a South African actress and singer. She played Bongi in MTV Shuga including the 2020 mini-series titled MTV Shuga Alone Together.

== Life ==
Cele was raised in Soweto but born in Matatiele in 1991. She can speak English, Sesotho, IsiZulu, IsiXhosa and Setswana. She graduated from the University of the Witwatersrand.

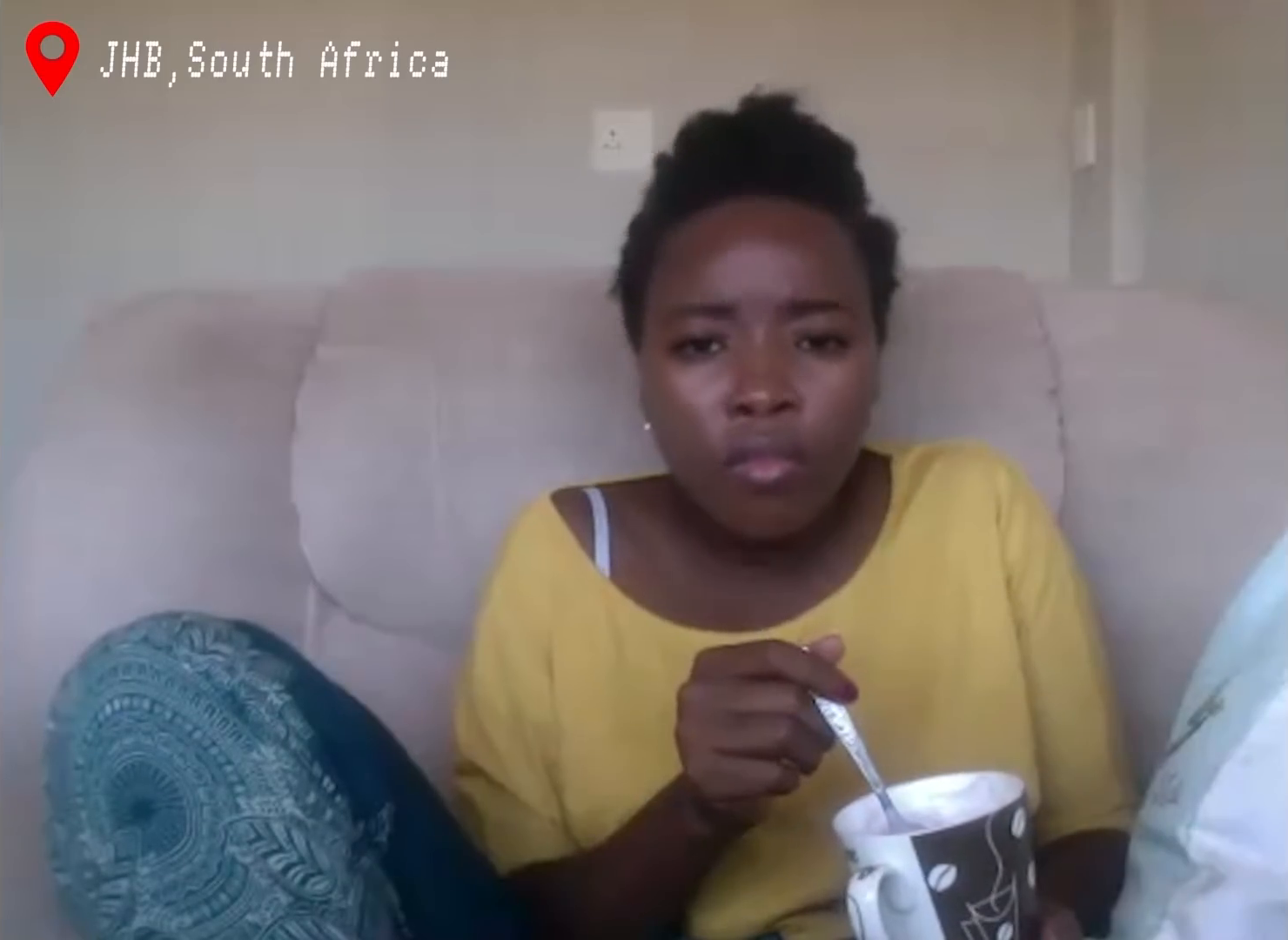
Mohau Cele as Bongi on-line in MTV Shuga Alone Together in 2020

Her first acting role was with MTV Shuga which she joined in season 4 as Bongi. She got the audition because they were looking for a singer. She had done some acting at university, but her first professional acting job involved travelling from South Africa to Nigeria where series 4 was filmed over six weeks. The edutainment series was backed by Bill & Melinda Gates Foundation and UNICEF.

She was a character in the series Thuli noThulani for SABC in 2017 where she played Vice Principal.

She was in series 4, 5 and 7 of MTV Shuga and she was included when it went into a mini-series titled MTV Shuga Alone Together highlighting the problems of Coronavirus on 20 April 2020. The series was written and directed by Tunde Aladese and Nkiru Njoku and broadcast every week day - its backers include the United Nations. The series will be based in Nigeria, South Africa, Kenya and Côte d'Ivoire and the story will progresses using on-line conversations between the characters. All of the filming will be done by the actors who include Lerato Walaza, Sthandiwe Kgoroge, Uzoamaka Aniunoh, Mamarumo Marokane, Jemima Osunde and Marang Molosiwa.
