= Tunde Aladese =

Nigerian film actress and writer

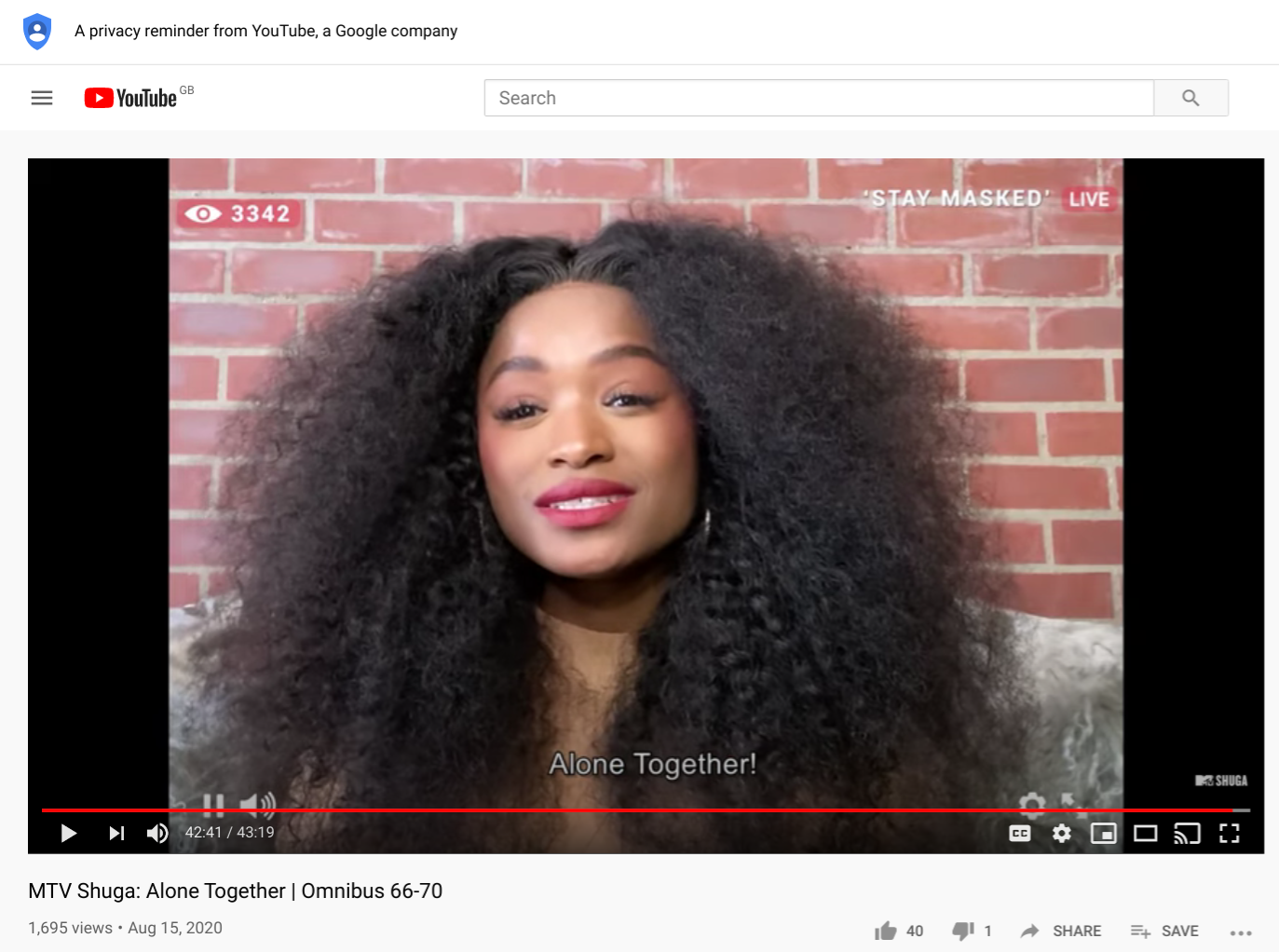
- Education: University of Ibadan
- Occupation: Screenwriter
- Notable work: The Lost Café
- Awards: Africa Movie Academy Award for Best Actress in a Leading Role

Tunde Aladese is a Nigerian actress and screenwriter. In 2018, she received an Africa Movie Academy Award for Best Actress in a Leading Role. In 2020, she wrote the 70 night drama for MTV Shuga which was filmed by the actors themselves from over four countries, with languages, English, Swahili, Yoruba, Hausa and Pidgin. It is a campaign focusing on the sexual health of young people between the ages 16 – 25.

== Career ==
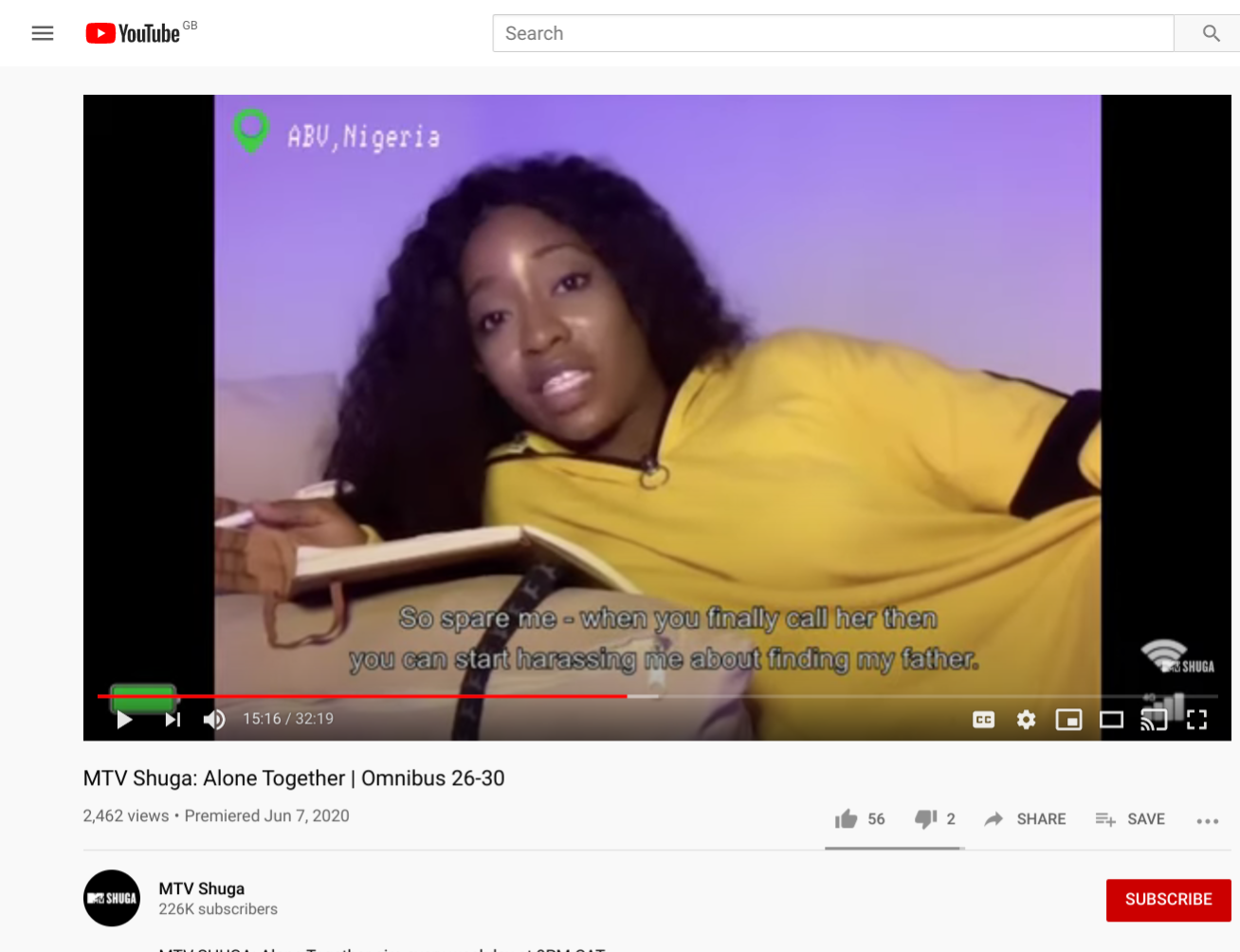
Adebukola Oladipupo in MTV Shuga filmed by the actors over four countries in 2020

Aladese was interested in drama since primary school, joined a drama club and had an obsession with The Sound of Music. She studied English literature at the University of Ibadan and assisted with a drama series destined for the BBC in Nigeria. She loves to write and was critical. She went on to study at the private MetFilm School, based in London and Berlin, gaining a BA in Practical Filmmaking.

Aladese has written scripts for Edge of Paradise and Tinsel. She was the head writer for the series Hotel Majestic. In 2018, she was listed by YNaija as one of the 10 most powerful Nigerians under 40. In 2018, Aladese role in Kenneth Gyang's The Lost Café, got her nominated for best actress in a leading role at the Africa Movie Academy Awards.

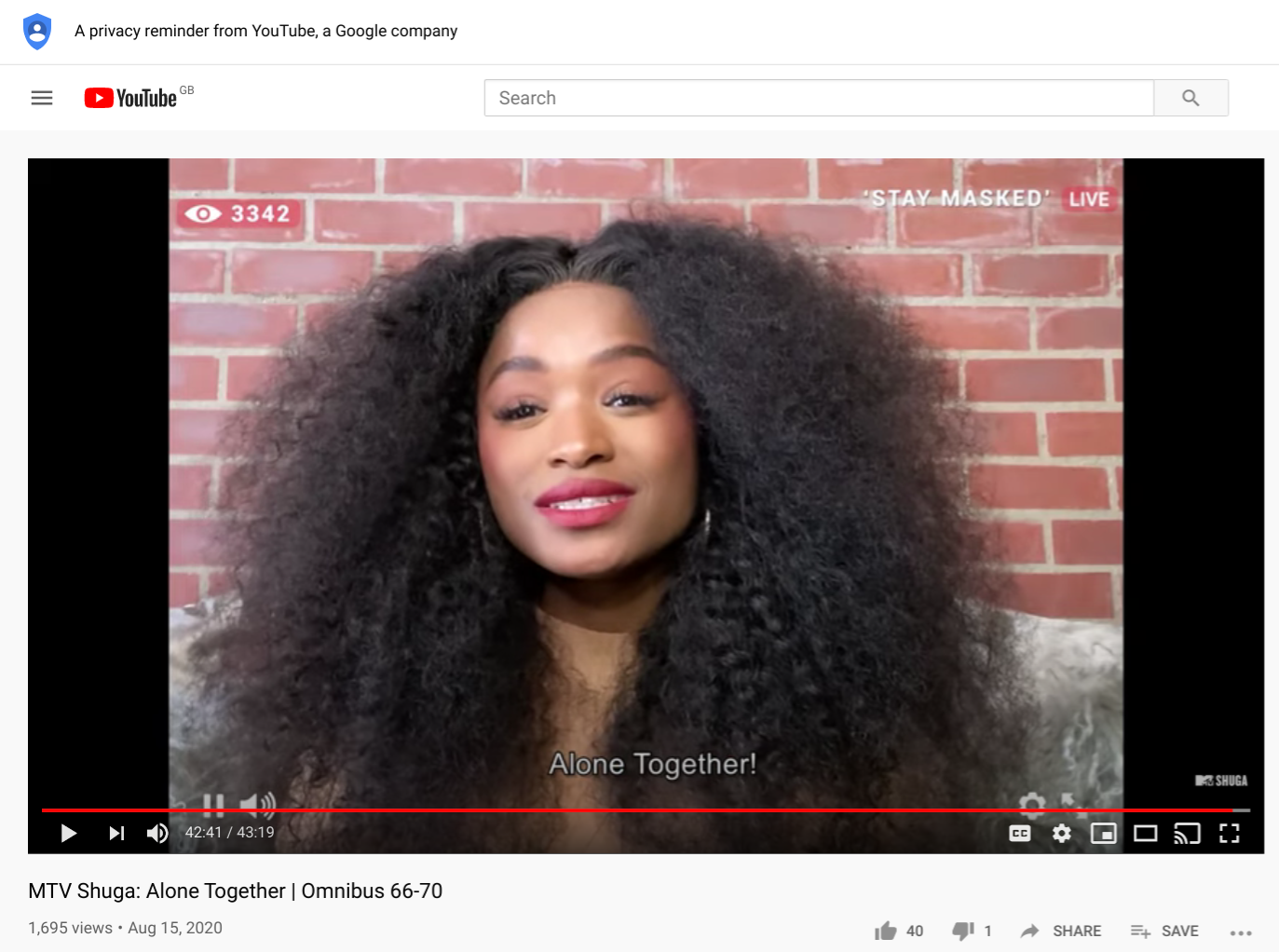
Screenshot from the final 70th episode of MTV Shuga Alone Together

Aladese began writing episodes for MTV Shuga when its series was called Shuga Down South. She wrote two episodes, but in 2019 she was appointed as head writer for the project. During the COVID-19 pandemic, she was asked to write daily episodes for MTV Shuga Alone Together highlighting the problems of Coronavirus. The show was first broadcast on 20 April and its backers include the United Nations. The series was based in Nigeria, South Africa, Kenya and Cote D’Ivoire and the story was explained with on-line conversations between the characters. All of the filming was done by the actors themselves. The series was planned to last for 65 episodes.

== Filmography ==
- MTV Staying Alive
- Confusion Na Wa (2019) as Isabella
- Hotel Majestic (2015 TV series, 260 episodes) (as head writer)
- Bridge of Pedro (2017)
- The Lost Café (2018) as Ose
- Hello, Rain (2018) as Philo
- Transatlantic (2023)

== Awards and nominations ==
- 2013 Best Supporting actress - Nigeria Entertainment Awards
- 2015 Best Supporting Actress-Africa Magic Viewers' Choice Awards
- 2018 Africa Movie Academy Award for Best Actress in a Leading Role
