= MTV Staying Alive =

HIV/AIDS prevention campaign

- Founded: 1998
- Purpose: HIV, Aids
- Location: London, United Kingdom
- Region served: Global
- Method: Donations
- Website: http://mtvstayingalive.org

Staying Alive is an MTV international initiative to encourage HIV prevention, promote safer lifestyle choices and fight the stigma and discrimination that fuels the HIV epidemic. Staying Alive is the world's largest HIV mass media awareness and prevention campaign in the world. It produces TV programming in the form of concerts, documentaries, public service announcements, TV film, film competitions, and others. It also has a website with celebrity content talking about safe sex.

== Goals and objective ==
=== Goals ===
Staying Alive's aim is to reduce HIV infections among young people globally. It does this by using entertainment to publicize vital safe sex information so that young people are empowered to make safer sexual and lifestyle decisions.

=== Objectives ===
• To raise awareness and knowledge about HIV/AIDS and safer sex skills for young people.
• To fight the stigma and discrimination associated with HIV/AIDS.
• To empower young people to take concrete action to protect themselves and others against HIV/AIDS.
• To engage other businesses, media and organizations to form their own response to HIV/AIDS. This includes broadcasting or using Staying Alive material rights at no cost.

== History ==
Staying Alive began in 1998 as a one-off award-winning documentary, with the same name, about six young people from around the world and how their lives were affected by HIV and AIDS and was hosted by George Michael. In 2002, it expanded into an ongoing global multi-media campaign that provides targeted information about HIV and AIDS using a wide range of interventions that include programming, advocacy, and grant-making. In 2005, Staying Alive launched the Staying Alive Foundation to provide small grants to young people who are responding to multiple threats of HIV, through prevention and create enabling environments for HIV+ patients in their communities.

== Evaluation ==
The 2005 evaluation of Staying Alive found that the campaign resulted in significantly more interpersonal communication about HIV/AIDS amongst those who were exposed to the campaign and that this in turn had a positive effect on social norms. More young people exposed to the campaign felt it was important to use a condom, discuss HIV with sexual partners and get tested for HIV.

== The Staying Alive Foundation ==
In 2005 the Staying Alive Foundation was launched. The Staying Alive Foundation is a public charity registered in the US and UK and supported by MTV. Twice yearly, the Foundation presents the Staying Alive Awards: small grants that support innovative projects by youth-led organizations in schools, youth centers, and clubs using radio, TV, print, on-line and personal interactions that reach at-risk youth and protect them from the multiple threats posed by HIV and AIDS. The Foundation's mandate to support individuals fighting AIDS on the frontlines is an unusual grant-making strategy that is showing extraordinary results as more and more young Award winners become HIV-prevention leaders in their communities. In 2008, the R&B singer-songwriter Kelly Rowland was appointed as the global Ambassador for the MTV Staying Alive Foundation. In June 2008, Kelly Rowland visited SAF projects in Kenya, Tanzania and South Africa. Gym Class Heroes vocalist Travie McCoy was appointed the succeeding 2009 global ambassador. In June 2009, he visited AIDS clinics in South Africa, India, and the Philippines.

== See also ==
- The Mpowerment Project
- Advocates for Youth
