= Shuga (TV series) =

African television drama series

- Title screen
- Also known as: MTV Shuga: Naija; MTV Shuga: Down South
- Genre: Drama series
- Based on: HIV/AIDS; Teenage Life; Safety
- Written by: Amanda Lane (head writer) (seasons 1–2); Kemi Adesoye (head writer) (season 3; season 8); Tunde Aladese, Nkiru Njoku
- Directed by: Teboho Mahlatsi (season 1–2); Angus Gibson, John Trengrove (Season 2); Biyi Bandele (season 3); Tope Oshin, Tolulope Ajayi, Ishaya Bako (season 6); Tope Oshin, Daniel Ademinokan, Tolulope Ajayi (season 8)
- Creative directors: Tim Horwood (season 1–2); Tope Oshin, Jane Arnell (seasons 3–4); Tope Oshin (season 8)
- Starring: Lupita Nyong'o; Tiwa Savage; Ikubese Emmanuel; Okezie Morro; Maria Okanrende; Dorcas Shola Fapson; Sharon Olago; Antony Mwangi; Edward Nyanaro; Nick Mutuma; Avril Nyambura; Nancy Karanja; Samke Makhoba; Richard Mofe Damijo; Ruby Akubueze; Osas Ighodaro; Adebukola Oladipupo; Timini Egbuson; Funlola Aofiyebi Moses Akerele; Thuso Mbedu; Kiki Omeili; Kanaga Jnr; Ayakha Ntunja; Tshiamo Molobi
- Theme music composer: David Campos, Philip Miller (seasons 1–2); Warrick Sony (season 1); Nic Patton, Hibou Music (season 2); Ben Onono, Rhys Adams (season 3)
- Composer: Daniel Ademinokan (Season 8)
- Countries of origin: Kenya (seasons 1–2); Nigeria (seasons 3–4, 6, 8); South Africa (seasons 5, 7)
- Original language: English
- No. of seasons: 8
- No. of episodes: 57

Production
- Executive producers: Georgia Arnold (seasons 1–8); Cathy N. Phiri & Chris Torline (seasons 1–2); Sara Piot, Richard Warburton (season 3)
- Producers: Desiree Markgraaff (seasons 1–2); Jonathan Curling (season 3); Chris Ihidero (seasons 4, 6); Tope Oshin, Bose Oshin (season 8)
- Cinematography: Zeno Petersen (season 1–2); Hein de Vos (season 3); Yinka Edward (seasons 6, 8)
- Editors: Carl Morgan (season 1); Jeremy Briers (season 2); Matthew Bate (season 3)
- Camera setup: Adekunle Nodash Adejuyigbe (seasons 3, 8); Daniel Ademinokan (season 8)
- Running time: ~30 minutes
- Production companies: The Bomb Shelter (seasons 1–2); MTV Staying Alive Foundation Production (season 3); SmatMedia (season 6); Sunbow Productions (season 8)

Original release
- Network: MTV Base; YouTube
- Release: November 2009 – present

Shuga, also known as MTV Shuga, is a drama television series that first aired in November 2009 on MTV Base as part of an initiative dubbed "MTV Staying Alive Ignite!". Its first two seasons were commissioned by MTV Networks Africa in association with The MTV Staying Alive Foundation, PEPFAR, the Partnership for an HIV-Free Generation (HFG) and the Government of Kenya, as part of a multimedia campaign to spread the message about responsible sexual behaviour and tolerance. The term Shuga is derived from the pronunciation of "Sugar" in Kenyan English.

The series later became a hit and was aired in 40 different African countries before it was aired internationally in over 70 television stations. The drama was thought to be a very controversial series by the senior generation of Kenyans because it contained some scenes that contained sexually explicit content. It received a Gold award in May 2010 at the World Media Festival in Hamburg, Germany in the Public Relations Health category for its focus on love, emotions, and sexual behavior amongst Kenyan youth.

In 2013, production of the series was moved to Nigeria, where the third and subsequent seasons are set. Dubbed "Shuga Naija", the new version is a multimedia campaign which educates youths on HIV/AIDS, safe sex and teen pregnancy.

Shuga also touches on maternal and child health, family planning, gender-based violence, and women empowerment. It was produced in partnership with Nigeria's National Agency for the Control of AIDS (NACA). Season 5 of the series was unveiled in partnership with Unitaid, the Global Innovation Fund, and Paramount. Season 3 of the series was broadcast via 88 television stations across the world, with estimated household viewers of over 550 million.

== Plot ==
=== Season 1 (2009) ===
Season one comprised three episodes that followed the lives and love of a group of young students whose bright lives and fabulous future were balanced on a knife edge due to their love of risk and danger. This season told the story of a modern girl Ayira (Lupita Nyong'o) who knew what she wanted and how to get it. She developed passion with an older man at the expense of a longtime lover Ty. This season also highlighted the life of other two lovers Virginia and Leo who had various obstacles in their relationships but they were determined to make it work. This season also featured cameo appearances from Madtraxx, P-Unit, Nonini, Nameless, Juliani, Jimmy Gait and Dj Adrian.

=== Season 2 (2011) ===
Principal photography for the series took place in Kenya (Nairobi and Malindi) in August – September 2011. The title song for “Shuga: Love, Sex, Money” debuted on MTV Base (DStv Channel 322) on Saint Valentine's Day in 2012. Other artists that featured in the soundtrack included Camp Mulla, Flavour, P-Square, Wyre, Madtraxx, J Martins, and Stella Mwangi. Season two premiered on 10 February 2012 at the Kenya National Museums. This season comprised six episodes which were followed by a one-hour synopsis episode. It was aired in Africa weekly on MTV Base (DStv Channel 322) from Tuesday 14 February 2012 at 21:30 CAT (20:30 WAT/22:30 EAT) and on other terrestrial broadcasters. The storylines in this season are rape, transactional sex and homosexuality plus a bunch of other issues to be explored included HIV testing, stigma, condom use, gender inequity and the role of multiple partnerships in driving the HIV epidemic. This season also planned some gay scenes that were meant to tackle the HIV/AIDs spread among the gay people. According to Georgia Arnold the executive producer of the drama series, the actual plan had to be pulled back to avoid controversy since it was a delicate matter in Kenya.

=== Season 3 (2013) ===
The third season of the series, dubbed Shuga Naija, was shot and set in Nigeria, produced in partnership with the National Agency for the Control of AIDS (NACA). It is directed by Biyi Bandele and stars Tiwa Savage, Chris Attoh, Maria Okanrende, Emmanuel Ikubese, Sharon Ezeamaka, Efa Iwara, Olumide Oworu, Dorcas Shola Fapson, Rahama Sadau, Okezie Morro, Timini Egbuson, Kachi Nnochiri, Sanni Mu'azu and Leonora Okine. Shuga Naija tells the story of several Lagos youths and how they deal with love, sex and relationships.

It was announced in June 2013 that new seasons of Shuga would be produced in Nigeria At the unveiling event, it was stated that the new series will have a whole new look; with predominantly Nigerian cast and crew. Speaking on the transition, Alex Okosi, the managing director of Viacom International Media Networks Africa says producing the project in Nigeria will help the realization of the series due to Nigeria's flourishing entertainment industry. According to Business Day; "When it is a Nollywood production, it tends to get more recognition and embrace for people, both locally and internationally". Principal photography commenced in August, mainly in Lagos.

The third season of Shuga [Shuga Naija] premiered on 26 November 2013 at the Silverbird Cinema, Victoria Island, Lagos, and was generally positively received by the audience.

=== Season 4 (2015) ===
The fourth season of Shuga was filming in Nigeria, in early 2015. Prior to its release, a nationwide HIV campaign tagged "MTV Shuga on Tour" was held in March 2015, in partnership with the Elton John AIDS Foundation. The campaign involved a peer to peer education drive seeking to change the attitude of Nigerian youth towards public health issues. Shuga 4 focused on themes involving adolescent girls, stigma, prevention of mother to child transmission (PMTCT), HIV testing, gender based violence, first sex and the disclosure of HIV status.

=== Season 5 (2017) ===
The fifth season was called "Shuga: Down South" and it was based in South Africa. It premiered on March 17, 2017. It was set in the cool clubs, hangouts and schools of Johannesburg's Braamfontein, and the township of “Zenzele”. Starring Vanessa Mdee, Samke Makhoba, Nick Mutuma, Given Stuurman, Mohau Cele, Lerato Walaza and Emmanuel Ikubese, with cameo performances from Seyi Shay and Kwesta. The seasons themes included abusive relationships, sexual assault, back alley abortions, and "blessers" in addition to continuing the conversation about HIV. This was one of the darkest seasons of Shuga as it featured the death of a character.

=== Season 6 (2018) ===
The sixth series of Shuga returned to Nigeria and premiered on March 7, 2018. Set against the backdrop of a bustling Lagos metropolis, where we see the northern and southern communities blended together. In this new season we meet a host of new characters dealing with coming of age drama. Friendships are tested, relationships reach risky heights, and secrets threaten to break family ties. Starring: Timini Egubson reprising his role from previous seasons as Toby. Sharon Ezeamaka, Jemima Osunde, Rahama Sadau, Adebukola Oladipupo, Moses Akerele, Abayomi Alvin with a cameo performance from YCEE.

=== Season 7 (2019) ===
The seventh series was again based in South Africa and called "MTV Shuga Down South". Stephanie Sandows who had played Tsholo in the first series reappeared as herself for a special.

== Shuga Babi (2019) ==
A French-language season of Shuga was produced for the first time, set in Côte d'Ivoire. The season debuted in December 2019. A second series debuted in 2021.

== MTV Shuga Alone Together (2020) ==
As a result of the Coronavirus pandemic, Shuga went into a mini-series nightly show titled MTV Shuga Alone Together highlighting the problems of Coronavirus on 20 April 2020. The show was to be broadcast for 65 nights and its backers include the United Nations. The series is based in Nigeria, South Africa, Kenya and Côte d'Ivoire and the story is explained with on-line conversations between the main characters. The writing is by Tunde Aladese and Nkiru Njoku. They were the head writers on the show and also directed the episodes. The filming, lighting and makeup was done by the actors themselves.
