= Jemima Osunde =

Nigerian actress & model (born 1996)

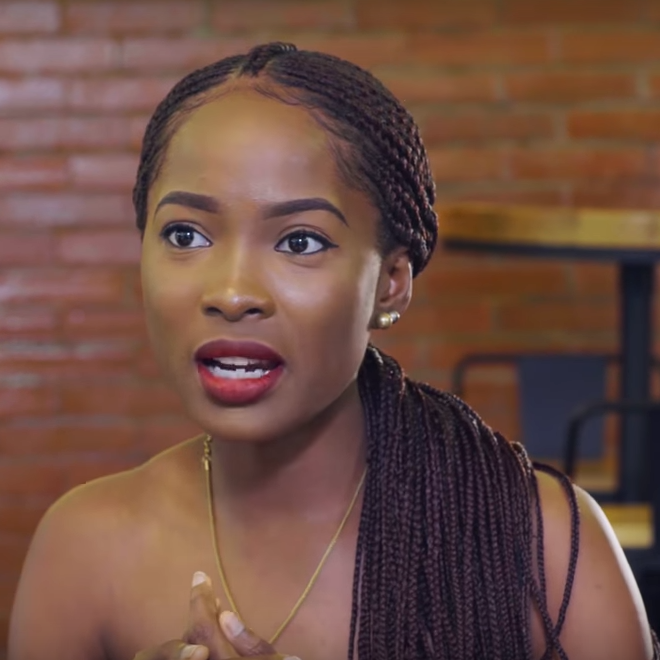
- Osunde appearing on an episode of NdaniTV's Real Talk
- Born: 30 April 1996 (age 30); Lagos, Lagos State, Nigeria
- Education: physiotherapy, University of Lagos
- Alma mater: University of Lagos
- Occupations: Actress; model; presenter; physiotherapist
- Known for: Shuga
- Notable work: The Delivery Boy
- Website: jemimaosunde.com

Jemima Osunde (born 30 April 1996) is a Nigerian actress, model, and presenter. She is best known for her role as Leila in the television series Shuga. Osunde was nominated for Best Actress in a Leading Role at the 15th Africa Movie Academy Awards for her performance in The Delivery Boy (2018).

== Early life ==
Jemima Osunde is an Edo State native. She grew up with her mother, father, and elder brothers. She is the last child and only daughter of her parents.

She studied physiotherapy at the University of Lagos. Osunde appeared in the film Jungle Jewel after being encouraged by her uncle to pursue acting in 2014.

== Career ==
Osunde's first big break was her role as Laila in MTV Shuga, appearing in the fourth series. When the show moved to South Africa for its fifth series, Osunde was written out for a year. She returned for the sixth series when it return to Nigeria. In 2018, she starred alongside Linda Ejiofor in the second series of NdaniTV's Rumour Has It.

Osunde was back for the seventh series of MTV Shuga's Alone Together which went out nightly featuring "lockdown" conversations between the main characters during lockdown from coronavirus. All of the filmings were done by the actors who include Lerato Walaza, Sthandiwe Kgoroge, Uzoamaka Aniunoh, Mamarumo Marokane, and Mohau Cele.

In 2020, she was cast in Quam's Money, a sequel to the 2018 film New Money. The follow-up story follows what happens when a security guard (Quam) suddenly becomes a multi-millionaire.

In October 2023, she co-launched her beauty brand "Sanaa Beauty" which was founded with Adesua Etomi.

== Education ==
She attended Air Force Primary School, went on to Holy Child college for her secondary school education, and had her tertiary education at the College of Medicine, University of Lagos. In 2019, Osunde graduated from the University of Lagos with a degree in physiotherapy. Osunde joined the mandatory National Youth Service Corps orientation program and uploaded a picture of herself participating in the program.

== Filmography ==
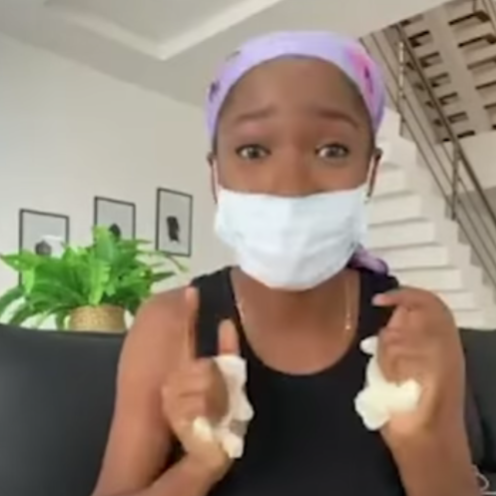
playing MTV Shuga's Leila during the lockdown in 2020

- Jungle Jewel (2013)
- Esohe (2017) as Esohe
- Stellar (2016) as Chinemerem
- My Wife & I (2017) Ireti Akinyele
- Isoken (2017) as Osato
- New Money (2018) as Toun Odumosu
- Lionheart (2018) as Onyinye
- The Delivery Boy (2018) as Nkem
- Quam's Money (2020) as Toun Odumosu
- This Lady Called Life (2020) as Toke
- Detour (2021) as Tari
- Akoni (2021) as Aretta
- The Reset (2022) as Rita
- Water and Garri (2024) as Stephany
- Hijack '93 (2024) as Temitope

=== Television ===
- Shuga (2015-2019) as Leila
- Ojays (2015)
- Inspector K (2018)
- The Johnsons (2015)
- This Is It (2016–2017)
- Rumour Has It (2018) as Ranti
- Papa Benji (2020)
- All of Us (2024 series) as Diane

== Awards and nominations ==
Year	Award	Category	Result	Ref
2019	Best of Nollywood Awards	Revelation of the Year – female	Nominated	
2019	Africa Movie Academy Award	Best Actress in a Leading Role	Nominated	
