= Mamarumo Marokane =

South African actress

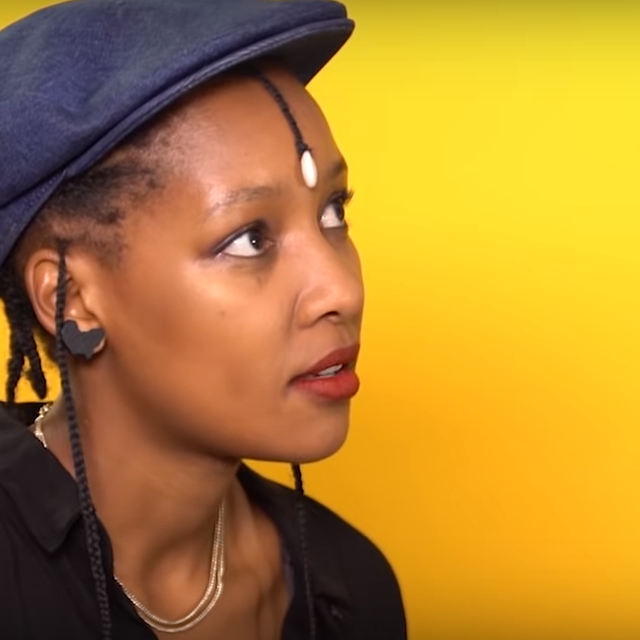
- Marokane in 2019
- Born: 15 August 1996 (age 29)
- Education: CityVarsity School of Media and Creative Arts
- Occupation: actress
- Height: 1.64 m (5 ft 5 in)

Mamarumo Marokane (born 15 August 1996) is a South African actor and presenter. She known for her appearances in Shadow and MTV Shuga.

== Early life ==
Marokane was born in tafelkop Limpopo province. She studied at CityVarsity School of Media and Creative Arts. She can speak English, Sepedi and Setswana.

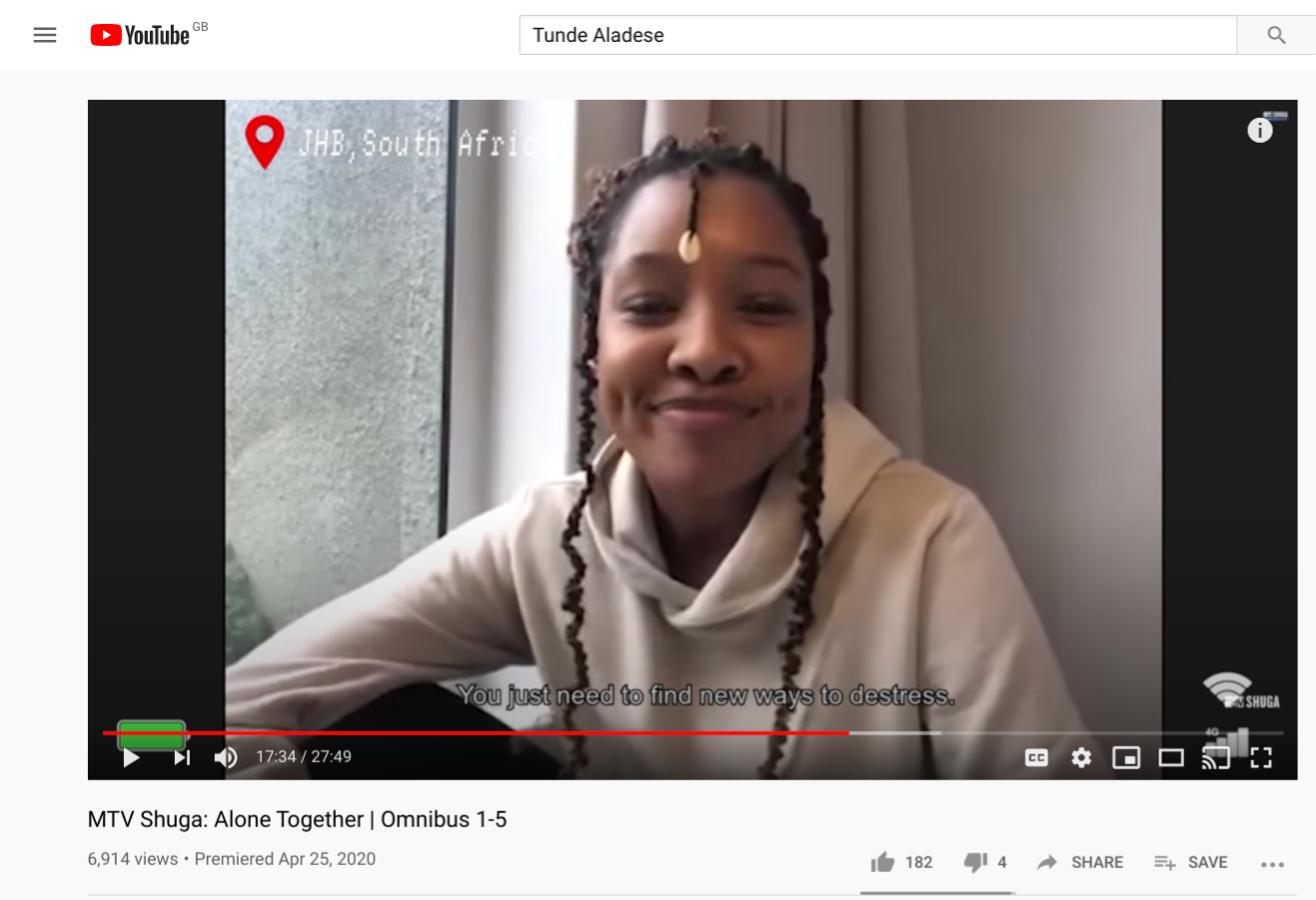
Mamarumo Marokane in the mini series titled MTV Shuga Alone Together in 2020.

== Career ==
She played the leading character of Bridget (also known as Vuvu) on the South African soap opera Scandal! from 2021 to June 2026. Marokane gained prominence through her appearances in the Netflix series Shadow.

In February 2020, Marokane was named one of four rising stars by Cosmopolitan South Africa. The others who appeared were Shonisani Masutha, Ama Qamata and Kuhle Adams.

She joined MTV Shuga Alone Together highlighting the problems of Coronavirus on 20 April 2020.

In 2022, she joined the cast of Is'phindiselo as Letti.

She was part of the Netflix series Miseducation in 2023. The college drama was very popular in South Africa.
