= Lerato Walaza =

South African actress

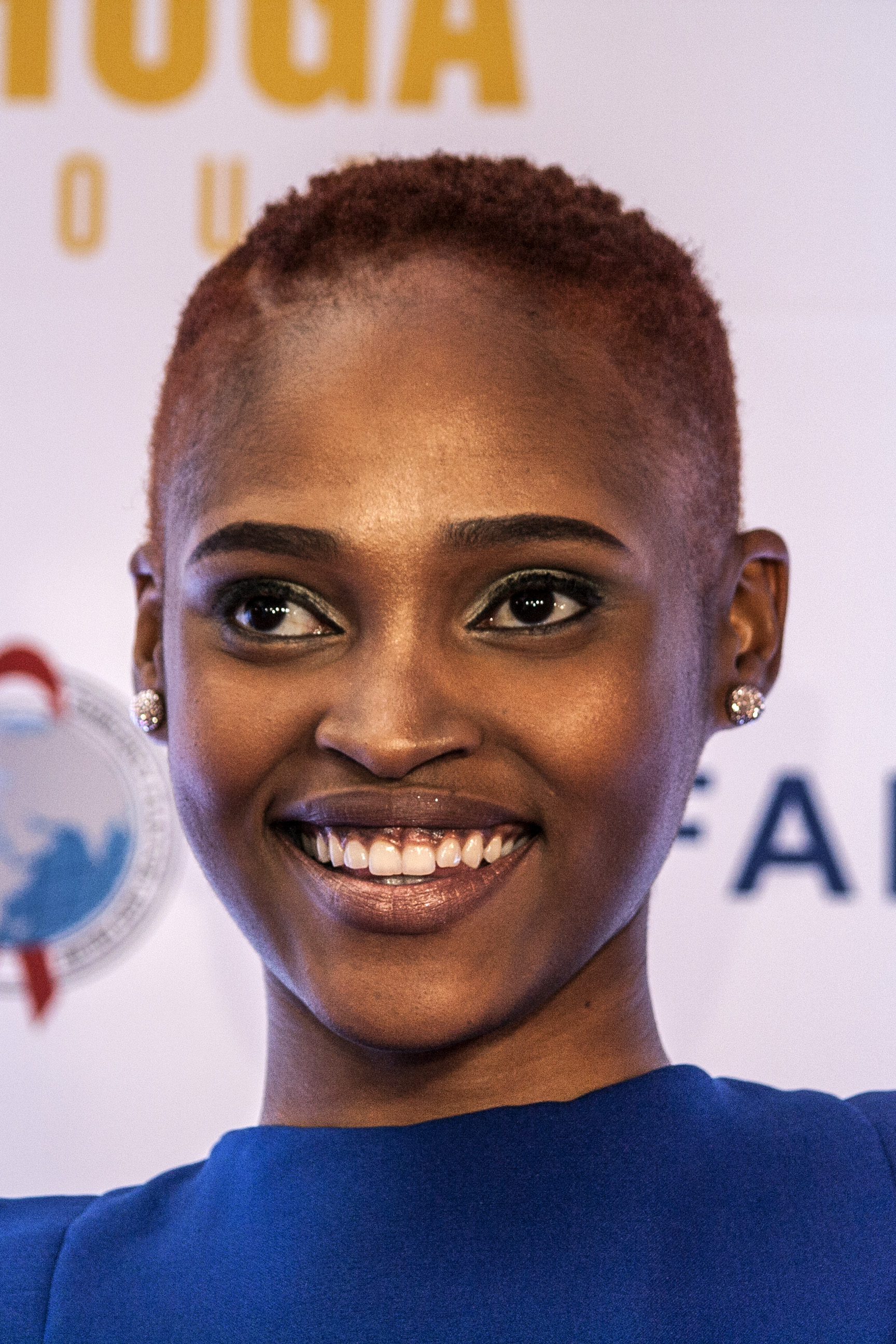
- Lerato Walaza
- Education: Tshwane University of Technology
- Occupation: actress
- Known for: MTV Shuga

Lerato Walaza is a South African actress who appears in the TV series Shuga. She was a recurring character who was still in Shuga when the series went into a nightly mini-series to highlight issues surrounding Coronavirus. The series is filmed by the actors and the story will be based in Nigeria, South Africa, Kenya and Côte d'Ivoire.

== Education and career ==
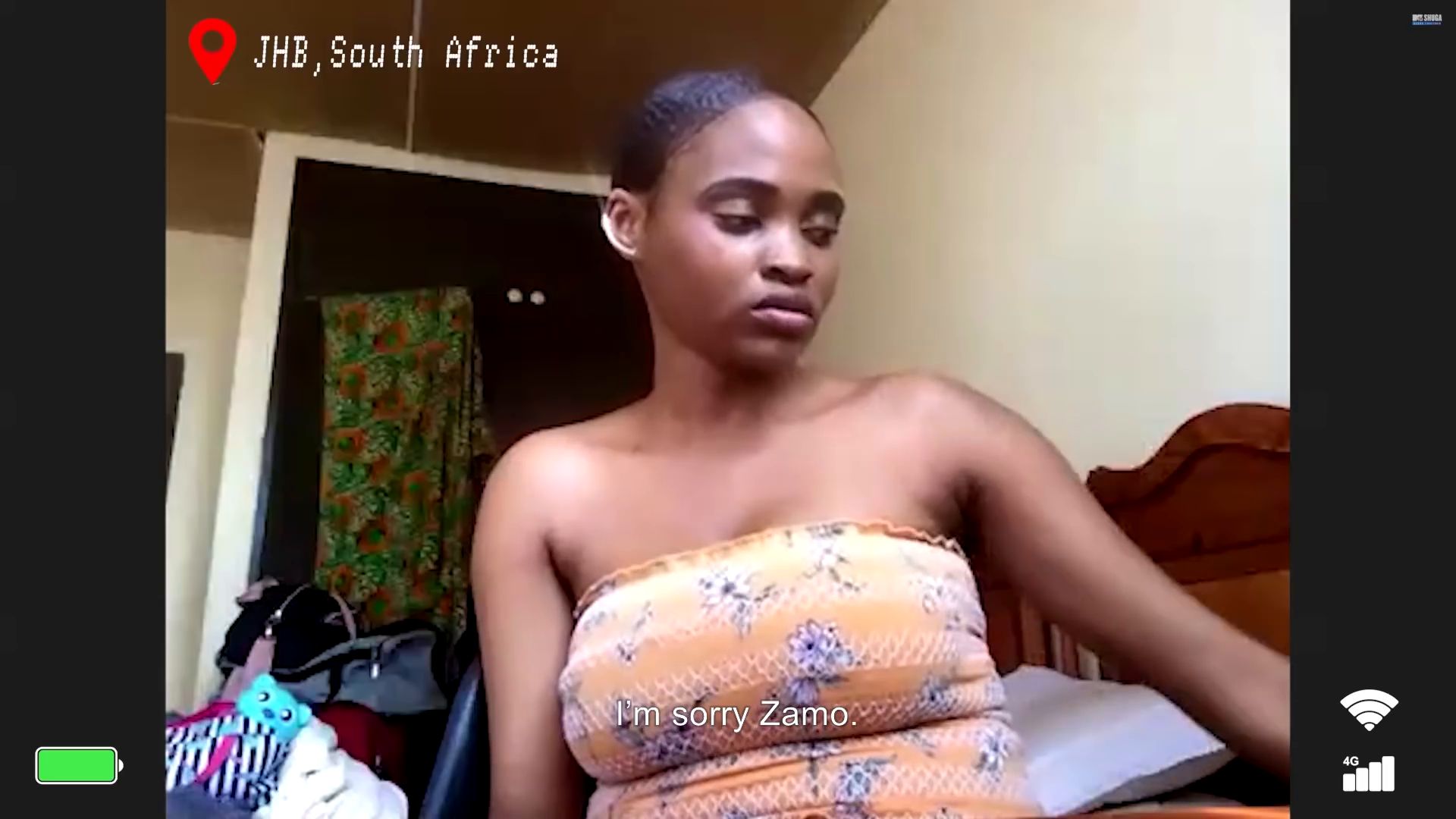
Zamo (Lerato Walaza) discussing life during COVID lockdown in 2020 in MTV Shuga series 7.

Walaza attended Tshwane University of Technology where she graduated in drama. She came to notice when she was given the role of Zamo in series one of MTV Shuga. She has the role of a young single parent showing the struggles of balancing life with bringing up a child even with the help of your mother. She was a recurring character who was also in series two.

She has appeared in the movie Letters of Hope which was screened at the Johannesburg Film Festival in 2019. The latter film was chosen as the opening film for the 5th South African International Film Festival.

In 2019, Walaza fulfilled MTV's educational mission by discussing condom usage on YouTube. She was still in MTV Shuga when it was adapted into a mini-series titled MTV Shuga Alone Together, highlighting the problems of coronavirus on 20 April 2020. The show was written by Tunde Aladese and Nkiru Njoku and broadcast for 70 nights, with backing from the United Nations. The series was based in Nigeria, South Africa, Kenya and Côte d'Ivoire and the story was explained through online conversations between the characters. All of the filming was done by the actors, including Mohau Cele, Nomalanga Shozi and Jemima Osunde.
