= Gidi Up season 2 =

Second season of Gidi Up

Gidi Up
- Season 2
- Promotional poster
- No. of episodes: 12

Release
- Original network: ndani.tv
- Original release: 23 June – 29 September 2014

Season chronology
- ← Previous; Season 1

The second season of Gidi Up was originally aired on Ndani TV from 23 June 2014 through 29 September 2014. The season which has twelve episodes, directed by Jadesola Osiberu, is set in Lagos, Abuja and Calabar, and continues to follow the lives of "four socialites as they strive to make it in a world that is anything but fair".

The first season of the series was produced as a web series of no longer than ten minutes per episode. The second season however has a length of thirty minutes per episode and is being broadcast on television, with all episodes of season 1 re-edited and combined as a 52-minute pilot episode for season two on television. Other changes made in the second season include the change in cast members who played the characters of Obi, Eki and Sharon in season 1. Gidi Up premiered on cable television on 13 July 2014, with plans to go on terrestrial broadcast very soon.

== Plot summary ==
Obi (OC Ukeje) is hijacked by his creditor, who snatched his car and gadgets as a payment for Obi's debt with him. Obi is taken to the hospital by Illa (Iretiola Doyle), who also paid for his expensive hospital bill; Obi eventually becomes Illa's Gigolo. After finding out about Illa's illegal ventures, Obi grows cold feet and tries to pull out of the relationship, and he ends up getting kidnapped.

Yvonne (Somkele Iyamah) lies to the police that Folarin (Daniel Effiong) is her boyfriend, and that what happened between them was a minor misunderstanding; this statement leads to the release of Folarin from the police custody. Sharon (Adesua Etomi), Chief Jagun’s daughter offers to go into business with Yvonne to start "Vone" all over again, which had crumbled along with Yvonne’s breakup with Chief Jagun. Yvonne is initially resistant towards the development, but she eventually accepts when Sharon reveals to her that she is aware of her relationship with her dad. However, rivalry often occurs between both parties in the business' decision making. Yvonne develops feelings for Meka (Anthony Monjaro), Yvonne's fiance, who has always felt that he is dating Sharon out of obligation and not love. Both eventually get much involved with each other, and Meka's wedding with Sharon is called off.

Tokunbo (Deyemi Okanlawon) starts up his company, "Techserve", with the help of some investors. Through his nonchalant attitude, he is unable to conclude his beta test at the deadline given. The investors however extended the deadline period, but this was hampered by Folarin, who is now into politics, and through his power shuts down Techserve in revenge for Yvonne. Tokunbo's father eventually sees reasons with his son and decides to invest in Techserve; he is however killed on his way home from Tokunbo's house.

Tokunbo's relationship with Eki (Titi Sonuga) at start looks good, but goes downhill after Tokunbo launches his business and he gets involved with Ify (Yvonne Ekwere). Eki gets pregnant, but Tokunbo strongly wants an abortion. Eki does his will and subsequently requests for a break. Though Tokunbo later apologises, Eki finds comfort in the arms of Mo (Ikechukwu Onunaku), who becomes her best friend and helps Eki in achieving her dreams.

== Cast and characters ==
There was a change in the actors playing certain characters in season two. OC Ukeje replaced Karibi Fubura for the Obi character, Titi Sonuga replaced Oreka Godis for Eki, while Adesua Etomi replaced KC Ejelonu for the role of Sharon. This is Titi Sonuga's first acting experience; she attended the audition mainly to catch her fun, but ended up being selected.

=== Main characters ===
- OC Ukeje as Obi (12 episodes)
- Deyemi Okanlawon as Tokunbo Adepoju (12 episodes)
- Somkele Iyamah as Yvonne (12 episodes)
- Titi Sonuga as Eki (12 episodes)

=== Supporting characters ===
- Adesua Etomi as Sharon Olaitan Jagun (10 episodes)
- Anthony Monjaro as Meka (10 episodes)
- Daniel Effiong as Folarin (9 episodes)
- Makida Moka as Monye (8 episodes)
- Iretiola Doyle as Illa (7 episodes)
- Demi Olubanwo as Yemi (7 episodes)
- Ikechukwu Onunaku as Mo (5 episodes)
- Ifeanyi Dike as Fred (4 episodes)
- Isio Wanogho as Bibi (4 episodes)
- Sharon Ooja as Jola (4 episodes)
- Aderonke Adebanjo as Roslyn (3 episodes)
- Taiwo Familoni as Segun (3 episodes)
- Abiodun Kassim as Charles (1 episode)
- Udoka Oyeka as Creditor (1 episode)
- Sean Amadi as Derrick (1 episode)

=== Guest stars ===
- Najite Dede as Ade (4 episodes)
- Jide Kosoko as Commissioner Olaitan (3 episodes)
- Yvonne Ekwere as Ify (3 episodes)
- Bimbo Manuel as Chief Jagun (2 episodes)
- Akin Lewis as Senator Deji (2 episodes)
- Joke Silva as Chief (Mrs) Adepoju (1 episode)
- Keppy Ekpeyong Bassey as Chief Jagun's friend (1 episode)
- Mai Atafo as Mai Atafo (1 episode)
- Ifeoma Fafunwa as Mrs Jagun (1 episode)
- Ayo Lijadu as Tokunbo's father (1 episode)

== Production ==
Due to the positive response received from the audience after the conclusion of season 1 of Gidi Up, the producers decided to make a second season that's bigger than the first season; It was decided to make it longer and also planned to be broadcast on television. As a result, more attention was paid to costuming, styling and other production aspects and details. Actors were taken to a remote camp in Osun State, outside Lagos for rehearsals before the commencement of principal photography. Gidi Up Season 2 was filmed in Lagos for a period of three months. On the decision to air on TV, associate producer Kemi 'Lala' Akindoju commented: "In every work of art, you want as many people as possible to see it, you would not want it to be restricted".

== Music and soundtrack ==
The series features independently produced music. The music selection is done by Tajudeen Opebiyi.

=== Track listing ===
No.	Title	Singer(s)	Length
1.	"Okheneme"	Pucado, Ill Bliss	4:10
2.	"No tomorrow"	Muna	3:36
3.	"Feel Alright"	SDC, POE, BOJ	4:28
4.	"Rands and Nairas"	Emmy Gee, AB Crazy, DJ Dimplez	4:07
5.	"Celebrate in Advance"	Ajebutter 22	3:38
6.	"Wazup Guy"	Falz	3:36
7.	"Jolomi"	Fame	4:04
8.	"Rainbow"	Black Magic	4:43
9.	"The Box"	Tay	3:26
10.	"Imposter"	Pucado, Kamar	4:20
11.	"Ogidiga"	SDC, Tillaman	3:36
12.	"Magic Carpet"	Tasti, IBK Spaceboi	4:02
13.	"Lengoma"	DJ Sbu, Zahara	4:31
14.	"Africa"	Black Magic	3:02
15.	"Gabriel"	Tay	4:34
16.	"Mercy and Me"	Tasti	3:15
17.	"The Bounce"	Tesh Carter	3:39
18.	"My Name is Coco"	Coco Benson	4:50
19.	"Tonga"	Joey B, Sarkodie	3:31
20.	"Trouble Sleep Yanga go wake am"	Lindsey	5:41
21.	"Turn Up"	LeriQ, Burna Boy, Phyno	3:58
22.	"Ibadi"	Niniola	3:32
23.	"Broken"	Ezi-Emela	4:42
24.	"Always"	Bemyoda	4:04
25.	"Superwoman"	Debrah Rose	3:47
26.	"Fefe"	Aura	3:51
27.	"Tytanium"	Slow	3:51
28.	"The Thirst"	Tay, Shiz	3:43
29.	"Enwonwu"	Sute, Tay	3:27
30.	"Drift Away"	Linsey	4:02
31.	"Secret Lover"	Ezi Emela, Skales	3:50
32.	"Sute"	Tsav	8:22
33.	"Gbowode"	Niniola	3:47
34.	"Omoge"	Wisdom, Buckwhile	2:57
35.	"Hide and Seek"	Titilope Sonuga, Femi Leye
36.	"Celebrate"	Mojeed	2:52
37.	"I Did It"	Wisdom	3:33
38.	"Believe"	Lindsey, Ese Peters

=== Music reception ===
The music selection and score of Gidi Up has often been commended by music critics. Demola Ogundele of NotJustOk comments: "Gidi Up is not just a show about love, failures, successes and heartaches; It's a show about love, failures, successes and heartaches, loaded with contemporary jams and that surreal 'sound of Lagos' you wouldn't find anywhere else. Gidi Up keeps it fresh with smashing jams and of course, a soothing soundtrack to go with it. So, whether you are getting down to Muna's "No Tomorrow" or letting your suspicions rise to Pucado's "Impostor"; one thing's for sure, sonically, Gidi Up is sound". Eromo Egbejule comments: "Throughout the series, it is so easy to note that the catalogue employed in making the music choices is as large in depth as it is lovely in execution. Variety is the spice of life and the afterlife and adds an extra layer to every story, including this one".

== Promotions ==
Gidi Up Season 2 was officially announced on BellaNaija on 28 May 2014. Behind the scenes documentary video for the season was released on 11 June 2014. Official poster and character posters were also released to the public on 13 June 2014. A private screening was held for first five episodes of the season on 21 June 2014 at the Genesis Deluxe Cinema, Lekki, ahead of its official release on 23 June.

== Reception ==
=== Critical reception ===
The first half of the season has been met with generally positive reviews; most critics noted that the actors' performances and the storyline have improved significantly from the previous season. Nollywood Reinvented commended the changes made to the second season, cited Folarin (played by Daniel Effiong) as the standout character and concluded: "Gidi Up is more than a superficial drama because laced within all the Lagos heat, it also brings to the surface relevant societal issues," "The show brings the laughs. It has amazing cameos, and genius script twists that it keeps you interested for long enough". Ghana Celebrities comments: "The writers paint a picture that's relatable to the audience", "No matter what caste or class you find yourself in, whether a socialite in Lagos or a pauper in the slums of Nima-Ghana, these are themes you can identify with". "It Moves at a logical step yet keeps the audience in a constant state of suspense and anguish; the audience's emotions is kept in a state of constant flux, making the slightest change in the fortunes of our protagonists keenly felt". It praised the acting, music and costume, concluding: "Moving at a pace reminiscent of all time classics like The Wire or Game of Thrones, Gidi Up keeps you immersed in the story to the extent that you often find yourself asking where the last half hour went". CherryChatter commends the character development, music and states: "…the series captures the face of new Lagos; paying homage to the 'new' career paths, articulating the angst and generally lending itself to defining who the new Lagosian is". "Lagos was presented as such a beautiful and vibrant city; the director's ability to capture the essence of contemporary Lagos was completely spot on - It showed a Lagos I was familiar with". Idara Owodiong-Idemeko of Culture Custodian commended the choice of soundtrack, but faulted the sound mixing, She gave a rating of 8.8 out of 10 stars and concluded by stating: "Jadesola Osiberu has birthed real life characters that are relatable in every way. Attractive as they are, they are heavily flawed, imperfect, fragmented and highly ambitious just like the rest of us. They want it all and they want it now and that makes for a great plot and complex characters, which ultimately culminate in giving us a fantastic series". Teefah Rozay commends the costume design and concludes: "Aside a teeny bit of over acting from a few of the secondary cast members, Gidi Up is an excellent production! It’s a well-acted sexy drama, with a relatable story line and lust worthy fashion to boot…definitely worth watching!

=== Accolades ===
Gidi Up was nominated for the category "Best TV/web series" at the 2014 Nollywood Movies Awards, but however lost to Tinsel. Iretiola Doyle has also been nominated in three categories at the 2015 Africa Magic Viewers Choice Awards.

Complete list of Awards
Award	Category	Recipients and nominees	Result
Nollywood Movies Network (2014 Nollywood Movies Awards)	Best TV/web series	Jadesola Osiberu	Nominated
Multichoice (2015 Africa Magic Viewers Choice Awards)	Best Television Series	Jadesola Osiberu	Pending
Multichoice (2015 Africa Magic Viewers Choice Awards)	Best Supporting Actress	Ireti Doyle	Pending
Multichoice (2015 Africa Magic Viewers Choice Awards)	Best Sound Editing		Pending

== Episodes ==
No. overall	No. in season	Title	Directed by	Written by	Original release date	Prod. code
9	1	"To Techserve!"	Jadesola Osiberu	Bodunrin Sasore, Jadesola Osiberu	23 June 2014	S1/E2-1/2
Derrick moves to Port Harcourt to work, Eki (Titi Sonuga) and Tokunbo get back together. Yvonne lies to the police that Folarin (who has been locked up since the assault he made on her) is her boyfriend and that what happened between them was a minor misunderstanding, leading to the release of Folarin from the cells. The future of Tokunbo's business looks bright, Eki's photography job is doing well, Yvonne's fashion label has crumbled, Obi (OC Ukeje) is hijacked by his creditor at night on the highway; he's beaten up, his car and gadgets are taken from him.
10	2	"Bad Decisions"	Jadesola Osiberu	Bodunrin Sasore, Jadesola Osiberu	23 June 2014	S1/E3-1/3
Obi is taken to the hospital by a woman (Ireti Doyle) who saw him lying unconscious on the road and she pays the hospital bills. The rift between Tokunbo and his dad is still on. Sharon (Adesua Etomi) proposes to Yvonne to be a partner in "Vone", Yvonne's fashion company; Yvonne hesitates, but later agrees after discovering Sharon already knows about her relationship with Chief Jagun, Sharon's father. Obi stays unconscious in the hospital and the episode ends with health workers trying to save his life.
11	3	"It's Folarin again!"	Jadesola Osiberu	Bodunrin Sasore, Jadesola Osiberu	23 June 2014	S1/E4-1/4
Eki starts showing symptoms of fever, Obi is now conscious and in a stable state. Sharon publicly asks Yvonne to join her wedding train at her engagement party with Meka (Anthony Monjaro). At the party, Yvonne gets to speak with Meka and they become friends. Folarin is introduced to Chief Jagun's business colleagues after Folarin has blackmailed Jagun to tell his wife and daughter about his extra marital affairs.
12	4	"She's Not You"	Jadesola Osiberu	Bodunrin Sasore, Jadesola Osiberu	23 June 2014	S1/E5-1/5
Yvonne and Sharon re-launches Vone fashion brand; in a short while, Sharon is already trying to relegate Yvonne, and making company decisions alone. Obi is invited over by Illa, the woman who paid his bills; Illa seems to be interested in having a relationship with him. Tokunbo starts to acquire unnecessary assets for the company, he also buys a Range Rover for himself; Yemi (Demi Olubanwo) is worried about Tokunbo's wasteful spending, and also about the fact that they've not prepared enough for a beta test presentation, which would determine if the investors really want to fund the business or not. Eki and Tokunbo start to drift apart again, while Tokunbo hooks up with Ify (Yvonne Ekwerre), his old time friend.
13	5	"Catch and Release"	Jadesola Osiberu	Bodunrin Sasore, Jadesola Osiberu	23 June 2013	S1/E6-1/6
Folarin visits Chief Jagun's friends in Abuja, Meka and Yvonne bump into each other again at a party. Monye finally opens up to Obi that she likes him; they both kiss even though Obi is hesitant. Eki tests positive for pregnancy, while Tokunbo and Ify's relationship grows stronger.
14	6	"These Babes Aint Loyal"	Jadesola Osiberu	Bodunrin Sasore, Jadesola Osiberu	11 August 2014	S1/E7-1/7
Obi makes out with Monye, while also getting serious with Illa as a Gigolo. Yvonne's business with Sharon is booming, Folarin is trying to outsmart the other workers in Abuja and getting on the good sides of the Senators. Meka professes his love for Yvonne, but Yvonne makes it clear that she can't betray Sharon and that they both [Meka and Yvonne] have to be professional in running the business; Meka leaves her presence in anger. Eki tells Tokunbo about the pregnancy, and he tries to convince her to have an abortion.
15	7	"What's Best for the Business"	Jadesola Osiberu	Bodunrin Sasore, Jadesola Osiberu	11 August 2014	S1/E8-1/8
Illa buys a new car for Obi, Tokunbo is losing concentration at work and still much behind schedule in his preparation for the beta test. Obi's television show keeps getting better ratings; he eventually hooks up with Bibi (Isio Wanogho), a principled lady who has previously rudely turned him down. Yvonne and Sharon are still at loggerhead in making decisions, while Meka starts being moody when with Yvonne; Yvonne eventually approaches him and they both make out. Monye and Jola attend a party of a guy whom Jola met on Facebook; their drinks are laced with drugs, but Monye realizes it and texts Obi who comes to get them, though Jola has already been gang raped before he arrives.
16	8	"The End of the Road"	Jadesola Osiberu	Bodunrin Sasore, Jadesola Osiberu	12 August 2014	S1/E9-1/9
Eki tries to persuade Tokunbo to let them keep the baby but to no avail; she eventually goes for a D and C in an obviously illegal clinic. Tokunbo and his team present the half completed beta test and it's accepted; making the investors give an extension to the deadline. Yvonne and Meka get serious with each other; suspicious Sharon checks Meka's phone and sees the love texts, but Meka has saved Yvonne's number as "Rotimi", his male friend. Obi runs into a private conversation of Illa, together with some politicians including Folarin which involves executing someone; Folarin sees him and feels he overheard the discussion, but Illa thinks otherwise. Devastated Eki tells Obi to give her some space in their relationship.
17	9	"Shameless"	Jadesola Osiberu	Jadesola Osiberu	15 September 2014	S1/E10-1/10
Tokunbo's company, Techserve is given a quit notice by the Government, due to the Landlord's accumulated unpaid land use charges, Tokunbo has been unable to pay his staff, and the deadline for the beta test is in a week. Bibi and Obi starts to have a secret sexual relationship. Meka takes Yvonne on a weekend vacation out of town, lying to Sharon that he is going for business engagement; suspecting Sharon, seeks help from Folarin to follow Meka's movement. Eki teams up with Mo (Ikechukwu Onunaku), a close friend who's however been flirting with her, to start a photography exhibition, which has been Eki's longtime dream. Tokunbo, in remorse, comes to apologize for everything he has done to Eki. Meka who is now a key person in a Government organization in charge of Land use, orders instant lock up of Techserve, even though they've not been issued the final notice.
18	10	"Olympus has Fallen"	Jadesola Osiberu	Jadesola Osiberu	15 September 2014	S1/E11-1/11
Tokunbo's beta test preparation is doing well, until Folarin arrives with his team to shut down Techserve's building in revenge for Yvonne. Eki's exhibition turns out to be a success. Obi again overhears a suspicious Illa's conversation over the phone, and subsequently reads a message on Illa's phone from Folarin with the phrase "It is done!"
19	11	"Shots Fired"	Jadesola Osiberu	Jadesola Osiberu	15 September 2014	S1/E12-1/12
Meka and Sharon returns from their vacation, and they are accosted by Folarin; who informs Meka that he has twenty four hours to tell Sharon about his affair with Sharon, because he plans to publish their vacation pictures on the internet. Meka eventually confesses to Sharon about Yvonne, and calls off their wedding. Obi gets aware of the death of the new EFCC chairman and instantly realizes that Illa was definitely involved. Obi as a result, asks Illa for a break; this gets Illa angry and she subsequently threatens Obi. With few days to Tokunbo's beta test presentation, without any solutions in sight for his problems, he slips into depression and disconnects himself from his environment. Eki organizes another exhibition, in which Yemi attends, and informs her about the predicament of Techserve. She visits Tokunbo as a result, but she sees him with a girl he had picked up at the club; Eki leaves immediately, without listening to Tokunbo. Obi eventually informs Bibi about his suspicions of Illa and his fears, and Bibi advises that they inform Ade about the issue.
20	12	"Rock Bottom"	Jadesola Osiberu	Jadesola Osiberu	29 September 2014	S1/E13-1/13
Obi calls to meetup with Ade, in order to tell her about his problems; he however meets Folarin in her office, both staring at him deviously. Tokunbo's father visits and informs him that he his interested in investing in Techserve, after reading about him on a Forbes article. He also tells him how much he his proud of him. Yvonne and Meka decides to elope, but Sharon visits Yvonne before she could finish packing, and threatens her. Mo invites Eki over for a date. While driving his father back home, late in the evening, Tokunbo's car develops a fault. He goes to look for a Vulcanizer to help fix the flat tyre, but before he gets back, his father is shot by an armed robber. Illa, trying to convince Meka about his decision to marry Yvonne, tells him about Yvonne's relationship with Chief Jagun, Sharon's father. It is revealed that Folarin has kidnapped Obi, and he has also declared to run for a political office of a Councillor.
