= List of Gidi Up episodes =

Nigerian drama television and web series

Gidi Up is a Nigerian drama television and web series created by Jadesola Osiberu and executively produced by Lola Odedina. It is produced by Ndani TV and sponsored by GTBank. Episodes are first aired online through Ndani TV, and first aired on television via DStv's Africa Magic Showcase. Online broadcast of Gidi Up's first episode was on 20 February 2013 and the first television broadcast was on 13 July 2014.

The series which is mainly set in Lagos State, follows the lives of four young adults (Obi, Tokunbo, Eki and Yvonne) who are pursuing success and independence in the city of Lagos, and the challenges they are faced with at every step of the way in their quest to achieve their dreams. The word "Gidi", from the title "Gidi Up", is culled from the popular term "Las Gidi" (often shortened as "Gidi") which can be translated as "Real Lagos", and is used in referring to the city of Lagos.

The first season of the series was an eight-part web miniseries, with a length of four to eight minutes per episode and used to be broadcast only online, but the second Season was converted into a 30-minute episodial television and webseries, with the first season combined and aired on television as the pilot episode for season 2. There was also a change in the actors playing the lead characters for the second season; OC Ukeje replaced Karibi Fubura for the Obi character, Titilope Sonuga replaced Oreka Godis for Eki, while Adesua Etomi replaced KC Ejelonu for the character of Sharon.

== Series overview ==
Series	Episodes	Originally released	
Series	Episodes	First released	Last released
1	8	20 February 2013	16 April 2013
2	12	23 June 2014	29 September 2014

== Episodes ==
=== Season 1 (2013) ===
No. overall	No. in season	Title	Directed by	Written by	Original release date	Duration
1	1	"New Beginnings"	Jadesola Osiberu	Jadesola Osiberu	20 February 2013	8 minutes
2	2	"Lights, Camera, Cougars!"	Jadesola Osiberu	Jadesola Osiberu	20 February 2013	7 minutes
3	3	"Keeping Up Appearances"	Jadesola Osuberu	Jadesola Osiberu	6 March 2013	8 minutes
4	4	"Frenemies"	Jadesola Osiberu	Jadesola Osiberu	20 March 2013	8 minutes
5	5	"Beautiful Sweetness"	Jadesola Osiberu	Jadesola Osiberu	21 March 2013	7 minutes
6	6	"Snakes and Ladders"	Jadesola Osiberu	Jadesola Osiberu	4 April 2013	6 minutes
7	7	"Breaking Point"	Jadesola Osiberu	Jadesola Osiberu	16 April 2013	4 minutes
8	8	"Dark as Knight"	Jadesola Osiberu	Jadesola Osiberu	16 April 2013	5 minutes

=== Season 2 (2014) ===
No. overall	No. in season	Title	Directed by	Written by	Original release date	Prod. code
9	1	"To Techserve!"	Jadesola Osiberu	Bodunrin Sasore, Jadesola Osiberu	23 June 2014	S1/E2-1/2
10	2	"Bad Decisions"	Jadesola Osiberu	Bodunrin Sasore, Jadesola Osiberu	23 June 2014	S1/E3-1/3
11	3	"It's Folarin again!"	Jadesola Osiberu	Bodunrin Sasore, Jadesola Osiberu	23 June 2014	S1/E4-1/4
12	4	"She's Not You"	Jadesola Osiberu	Bodunrin Sasore, Jadesola Osiberu	23 June 2014	S1/E5-1/5
13	5	"Catch and Release"	Jadesola Osiberu	Bodunrin Sasore, Jadesola Osiberu	23 June 2013	S1/E6-1/6
14	6	"These Babes Aint Loyal"	Jadesola Osiberu	Bodunrin Sasore, Jadesola Osiberu	11 August 2014	S1/E7-1/7
15	7	"What's Best for the Business"	Jadesola Osiberu	Bodunrin Sasore, Jadesola Osiberu	11 August 2014	S1/E8-1/8
16	8	"The End of the Road"	Jadesola Osiberu	Bodunrin Sasore, Jadesola Osiberu	12 August 2014	S1/E9-1/9
17	9	"Shameless"	Jadesola Osiberu	Jadesola Osiberu	15 September 2014	S1/E10-1/10
18	10	"Olympus has Fallen"	Jadesola Osiberu	Jadesola Osiberu	15 September 2014	S1/E11-1/11
19	11	"Shots Fired"	Jadesola Osiberu	Jadesola Osiberu	15 September 2014	S1/E12-1/12
20	12	"Rock Bottom"	Jadesola Osiberu	Jadesola Osiberu	29 September 2014	S1/E13-1/13
