= Temi Dollface =

Nigerian singer

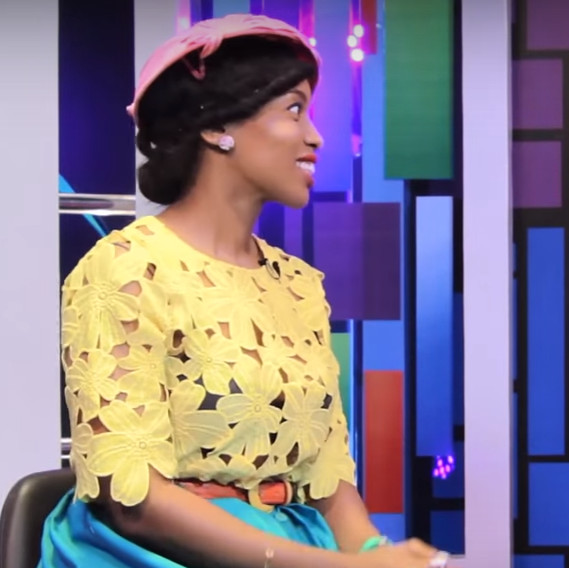
Temi Dollface on "The Juice" in 2014 on NdaniTV

Temi DollFace (born Temitope Samantha Phil-Ebosie, August 2) is a Nigerian electro-pop-soul singer, who grew up in England. Her music is described as "a brand of music that is jazzy, energetic and theatrical". She is best known for her 2013 single "Pata Pata", which received four AFRIMA nominations at the All Africa Music Awards for "Best Video", "Revelation Of The African Continent", "Best African Pop Song" and "Most Promising African Artiste On The Continent". In 2016 TemiDollFace released the single "Beep Beep", ahead of an album release.

== Career ==
Dollface was signed to Sony Records in the UK for five years. In September 2013, Dollface was invited by Mary J Blige to support her at the "Sisters with Soul" concert at the Expo Centre Lagos. She has since supported the likes of Chris Brown, Rahsaan Patterson, Femi Kuti, Keziah Jones, and others, and was invited by Coca-Cola to appear on their Nairobi music TV show Coke Studio, along with King Sunny Ade and M.I Abaga.

In 2013 she released the single "Pata Pata" which featured in series one of the Ndanitv soap opera Gidi Up. The song earned her four AFRIMA nominations at the December 2014 All Africa Music Awards for "Best Video", "Revelation Of The African Continent", "Best African Pop Song" and "Most Promising African Artiste On The Continent". The music video proved popular, and was regularly shown on channels such as MTV World, Channel O, Soundcity, One music, TVC, and others.

After releasing "Just Like That (Story)", in 2016 TemiDollFace released her third single, "Beep Beep", ahead of an album release. The magazine Music in Africa describes the song as being part of the "artist’s contribution to moving the ‘Girl Power movement’ towards the centre of pop culture and political conversations". It is a love song set in a 1930s cabaret. VivaNaija wrote: "The latest single by the Nigerian artiste, Temi Dollface, is gorgeous. Strands of afrobeat mix with strains of Jill Scott. I hear nu-soul, I hear funk. Janelle Monáe sat with Erykah Badu in a burlesque cafe and had tea with Fela. I love, love, love everything I hear."

In August 2016 Dollface was announced as one of the nominees for "Best Female Artiste in Western Africa" at the All Africa Music Awards (AFRIMA), with her song "School Your Face". Dollface was quoted as saying about "School Your Face": "As a creative, I like to play with contrasts and words similarly to what I do with clothes. It's really just needing that one trigger or fragment of an idea and then I invent the rest myself."

In October 2016 she was due to appear at the London Felabration 2016 with the Dele Sosimi Afrobeat Orchestra and artists such as Breis, Bumi Thomas, Afrikan Boy and Tiggs da Author.

== Personal life ==
Dollface, who is a keen fitness enthusiast, has received significant attention for her fashion sense.
