= Gidi Up season 1 =

First season of Gidi Up

Gidi Up
- Season 1
- Promotional poster
- No. of episodes: 8

Release
- Original network: ndani.tv
- Original release: 20 February – 16 April 2013

Season chronology
- Next → Season 2

The first season of Gidi Up was originally broadcast on ndani.tv in 2013; the first episode aired on 20 February 2013 and the concluding episode on 16 April 2013. The season is directed by Jadesola Osiberu and it consists of eight episodes, each with a length of not more than ten minutes. The season shows "how Tokunbo, Eki, Yvonne and Obi deal with love, sex and making a living in one of Africa's biggest cities". The second season of the series however has a length of thirty minutes per episode and was broadcast on television; all the episodes of season 1 was combined as a 52-minute pilot episode for the second season on television.

== Plot summary ==
Obi (Karibi Fubara) is a budding radio presenter. He is offered a huge television contract and as a result, he borrows a loan from a thug to acquire an apartment on the Island with a friend, Tokunbo (Deyemi Okanlawon) and to buy a car, amongst other things, hoping that when he gets his pay for the television project, he'd pay back the loan in no time. However, things doesn't go as planned when he is shown the documents, as his pay for the first season of the show is very low and not enough to do anything. The time of payment gets due and Obi ends up being constantly issued threats from his creditor.

Yvonne (Somkele Iyamah) is an upcoming fashion designer who is very determined to get what she wants. She starts up a fashion brand; "Vone" with the help of an aristo; Chief Jagun (Bimbo Manuel) who is very possessive. Things eventually turns sour as Yvonne ends her relationship with the chief, which makes Chief's personal assistant; Folarin (Daniel Effiong) to lose his job. Folarin attacks Yvonne as a revenge and is captured by the Police.

Tokunbo (Adeyemi Okanlawon) is having problems with his father regarding his career interest and he eventually leaves home to live together with Obi. Eki (Oreka Godis) also leaves her home because her parents do not support her dreams to pursue a career in Photography, a dream she's passionate about. She meets Tokunbo and they both fall in love.

== Cast and characters ==
=== Main characters ===
- Oreka Gordis as Eki (8 episodes)
- Karibi Fubara as Obi (7 episodes)
- Deyemi Okanlawon as Tokunbo Adepoju (7 episodes)
- Somkele Iyamah as Yvonne (6 episodes)

=== Supporting characters ===
- Daniel Effiong as Folarin (4 episodes)
- KC Ejelonu as Sharon Olaitan Jagun (4 episodes)
- Makida Moka as Monye (3 episodes)
- Udoka Oyeka as Creditor (2 episodes)
- Sean Amadi as Derrick (2 episodes)
- Abiodun Kassim as Charles (1 episode)
- Seun Ajayi (1 episode)

=== Guest stars ===
- Maria Okanrende as Maria (2 episodes)
- Najite Dede as Ade (2 episodes)
- Segun Arinze as Lanre (2 episodes)
- Bimbo Manuel as Chief Jagun (1 episode)
- Burna Boy as Burna Boy (1 episode)
- Temi Dollface as Temi Dollface (1 episode)
- Lynxxx as Lynxxx (1 episode)

== Music and soundtracks ==
The series features independently produced songs.

=== Track listing ===
No.	Title	Singer(s)	Length
1.	"Bastard"	Three Wise Men	3:51
2.	"Tonight"	Burna Boy	4:03
3.	"The Box"	Temi Dollface	2:45
4.	"1, 2, 3"	Falz
5.	"Serenre"	Ajebutter 22	4:10
6.	"Turn Me On"	Black Coffee	4:02
7.	"Selecta"	DRB-LasGidi, Shank	3:48
8.	"Faded Grace"	Bemyoda	4:13
9.	"Pata Pata"	Temi Dollface	4:00
10.	"Last Song"	Somi	4:33

=== Promotions ===
The trailer for season 1 was released on 7 February 2013. Along with the trailer, character posters were also released to the public, describing the role of each cast member.

== Reception ==
The first season of Gidi Up was generally met with mixed reception. It was praised for its beautiful cinematography and high production values, but criticized for its shallow storyline and the poor performance from the actors. Maryam Kazeem of OkayAfrica comments: "The production quality of this show is amazing. The cinematography depicts a visually beautiful Lagos, which we don't see enough...We love that the series highlights young Nigerians pursuing careers that aren't the typical professions. Rather we get to watch young creatives pursuing their unconventional and artistic careers and it definitely adds an extra layer to the show".

== Episodes ==
No. overall	No. in season	Title	Directed by	Written by	Original release date	Duration
1	1	"New Beginnings"	Jadesola Osiberu	Jadesola Osiberu	20 February 2013	8 minutes
Obi (Karibi Fubura) is introduced as a radio personality. Tokunbo Adepoju (Adeyemi Okanlawon) moves out of his parents' home after a disagreement with his dad concerning his career path; he moves to Obi's apartment where he gets introduced to Eki (Oreka Godis), Obi's close friend. Yvonne (Somkele Iyamah), a friend of Obi and Eki, is about to launch her fashion label later today. Obi attends a meeting on a television deal he is about to be signed to.
2	2	"Lights, Camera, Cougars!"	Jadesola Osiberu	Jadesola Osiberu	20 February 2013	7 minutes
Obi discovers that the pay for the first season of the television deal is very low. Yvonne launches her fashion label; it is revealed that the company is majorly funded by an Aristo of hers, Chief Jagun (Bimbo Manuel).
3	3	"Keeping Up Appearances"	Jadesola Osuberu	Jadesola Osiberu	6 March 2013	8 minutes
Eki and Tokunbo's relationship gets serious. Yvonne starts to ignore Chief Jagun; Jagun's personal assistant, Folarin (Daniel Effiong), confronts her and she opens up that she's been getting cold feet about her relationship with Chief after she met Chief's daughter at her label launch. Folarin threatens and urges Yvonne to accompany Chief to a few days' vacation in Los Angeles for the last time.
4	4	"Frenemies"	Jadesola Osiberu	Jadesola Osiberu	20 March 2013	8 minutes
Eki's sister, Monye (Makida Moka) has a crush on Obi. It is revealed that Obi had borrowed some money from a thug to buy the house he lives in on the Island, hoping he'd pay back after the television deal pulls through. The deal as it stands is not enough to cover his debt which is now overdue. He seeks Lanre (Segun Arinze)'s help; Lanre makes a pass at him, Obi vehemently refuses and leaves Lanre's house.
5	5	"Beautiful Sweetness"	Jadesola Osiberu	Jadesola Osiberu	21 March 2013	7 minutes
Eki and Tokunbo get to discuss some personal issues, and they make out. Obi is threatened again by his creditor (Udoka Oyeka).
6	6	"Snakes and Ladders"	Jadesola Osiberu	Jadesola Osiberu	4 April 2013	6 minutes
Obi starts to experience hallucinations, losing concentration at work. Sharon (KC Ejelonu) invites Yvonne to her wedding; Yvonne has also made her wedding dress. Obi returns to Lanre's apartment to agree to his terms, and tries to get drunk.
7	7	"Breaking Point"	Jadesola Osiberu	Jadesola Osiberu	16 April 2013	4 minutes
Tokunbo finally gets an investor for his business through the help of his friend, Derrick (Sean Amadi). Folarin loses his job after Yvonne eventually didn't accompany Chief to Los Angeles; he comes to assault Yvonne in her apartment as a result.
8	8	"Dark as Knight"	Jadesola Osiberu	Jadesola Osiberu	16 April 2013	5 minutes
Folarin tries to rape Yvonne, but she kicks him and locks him in a room. She tries to call Obi, but he can't pick up as he is still with Lanre. She calls Eki, who then calls the others. Folarin eventually breaks the door and continues to assault Yvonne. Obi while drunk still isn't able to pull through with Lanre and he leaves his house again. Eki arrives at Yvonne's place and knocks out Folarin.

== See also ==
- Gidi Up season 2
