= Niniola discography =

- Singles: 31
- Music videos: 32

Nigerian singer Niniola has released several singles and music videos.

== As lead artist ==
List of singles as lead artist, with selected chart positions and certifications, showing year released and album name
Title	Year	Peak chart positions							Certifications	Album
Title	Year	NGA	GHA	RSA	AUS	UK	US	US R&B/HH	Certifications	Album
"Ibadi"	2014	1	—	—	—	—	—	—		Non-album singles
"Gbowode"	2014	—	—	—	—	—	—	—		Non-album singles
"Akara Oyibo"	2015	—	—	—	—	—	—	—		Non-album singles
"Soke"	2015	—	—	—	—	—	—	—		Non-album singles
"J’ètè"	2016	—	—	—	—	—	—	—		Non-album singles
"Start All Over" (Niniola & Johnny Drille)	2016	—	—	—	—	—	—	—		Non-album singles
"Jigi Jigi"	2016	—	—	—	—	—	—	—		Non-album singles
"Shaba"	2016	4	—	—	—	—	—	—		Non-album singles
"Shaba (remix)"	2016	—	—	—	—	—	—	—		Non-album singles
"Maradona"	2017	1	—	1	—	—	—	—	RISA PLATINUM	This Is Me
"Sicker"	2017	5	—	—	—	—	—	—		This Is Me
"Saro"	2017	-	—	—	—	—	—	—		This Is Me
"Oyin"	2017	-	—	—	—	—	—	—		This Is Me
"Magun"	2017	-	—	—	—	—	—	—		This Is Me
"Magun Remix" (Niniola ft Busiswa)	2018	-	—	—	—	—	—	—		Non-album singles
"Bana"	2018	2	—	—	—	—	—	—		Colours and Sounds
"Designer" (Niniola ft Sarz)	2019	3	—	—	—	1	—	—		Colours and Sounds
"Boda Sodiq"	2019	2	—	—	—	-	—	—		Colours and Sounds
"Omo Rapala"	2019	7	—	—	—	—	—	—		Colours and Sounds
"Fantasy" (Niniola ft Femi Kuti)	2020	3	—	—	—	—	—	—		Colours and Sounds
"Addicted"	2020	3	—	—	—	-	—	—		Colours and Sounds
"Look Like Me"	2020	4	—	—	—	-	—	—		Colours and Sounds
"Innocent (fagbo)"	2020	-	—	—	—	-	—	—		Colours and Sounds
"Promise"	2021	-	—	-	—	—	—	—		6th Heaven
"Ryde"	2021	-	—	—	—	—	—	—		6th Heaven
"Too Sweet (O Dun)"	2021	1	—	—	—	—	—	—		Lagos To Jozi
"I Did It (Bum Bum)"	2021	9	—	—	—	—	—	—		Lagos To Jozi
"Want"	2022	-	—	-	—	—	—	—		Non Album Single
"Fuku"	2022	-	—	—	—	—	—	—		Non Album Single
"Memories"	2023	-	—	-	—	—	—	—		Non Album Single
"All Eyes On Me"	2023	4	—	—	—	—	—	—		Non Album Single
Belle	2025									
Raining (O Dun Mi)	2026									
"—" denotes a recording that did not chart or was not released in that territory.

== As featured artist ==
List of singles as featured artist, with selected chart positions and certifications, showing year released and album name
Title	Artist Name(s)	Year	Peak chart positions							Certifications	Album
Title	Artist Name(s)	Year	NGA	GHA	RSA	AUS	UK	US	US R&B/HH	Certifications	Album
"Aunty"	"DJ Osas"	2015	—	—	—	—	—	—	—		Non-album singles
"Fade Away"	"Largess"	2015	—	—	—	—	—	—	—		Non-album singles
"Identical To Heaven"	"Meaku"	2015	—	—	—	—	—	—	—		Non-album singles
"Carry Am Go (Remix)"	"Damz"	2015	—	—	—	—	—	—	—		Non-album singles
"Tan Mo"	"DJ Spinall"	2015	—	—	—	—	—	—	—		My Story: The Album
"Mbilo Mbilo (Remix)"	"Eddy Kenzo"	2016	—	—	—	—	—	—	—		Zero to Hero
"Juba"	"Seyi Shay"	2016	—	—	—	—	—	—	—		Non-album singles
"Ojukokoro"	"DJ Spinall"	2016	—	—	—	—	—	—	—		TEN
"KINI"	"Legendury Beatz"	2017	—	—	—	—	—	—	—		Afropop 101
"THINKING ABOUT YOU"	"DJ Spinall"	2017	—	—	—	—	—	—	—		Dreams
"GBE SEYIN"	"Yung6ix"	2017	—	—	—	—	—	—	—		High Star
"RO MO LE"	"DJ Consequence"	2017	—	—	—	—	—	—	—		THE VIBES MIXTAPE
"Leg Work"	"VJ ADAMS"	2018	—	—	—	—	—	—	—		Non-album songs
"Let Them Talk"	"Heavy K"	2018	—	—	—	—	—	—	—		Non-album songs
"Bam Bam"	"CROWD KONTROLLER"	2018	—	—	—	—	—	—	—		Non-album songs
"Rolling"	"DJ Neptune"	2018	—	—	—	—	—	—	—		GREATNESS
"Monini"	"DJ FORTEE"	2018	—	—	1	—	—	—	—		Non-album songs
"Lazaro"	"Muungu Africa"	2018	—	—	—	—	—	—	—		Non-album songs
"Maradona Riddim"	"DJ SNAKE"	2018	—	—	—	—	—	—	—		Non-album songs
"Legbegbe Remix"	"Mr Real"	2018	—	—	—	—	—	—	—		Non-album songs
"One More Night"	"Mr P"	2019	—	—	—	—	—	—	—		Non-album songs
"Jensimi"	"Reminisce"	2019	—	—	—	—	—	—	—		Non-album songs
"Chocolata"	"Ycee"	2019	—	—	—	—	—	—	—		'YceeVsZaheer'
"Pocket"	"Precision Production"	2019	—	—	—	—	—	—	—		'Bitter Sweet Riddim'
"Rollin"	"Trifecta"	2019	—	—	—	—	—	—	—		'Non-album song'
"Sodi"	"Dpzle"	2019	—	—	—	—	—	—	—		The Dpzle Show
"On My Mind"	"Solarrio"	2020	—	—	—	—	—	—	—		Non-album songs
"Dance To It"	"Vista & Dj Catzico"	2020	—	—	—	—	—	—	—		Non-album songs
"Putirika"	"Shuffle Muzik"	2020	—	—	—	—	—	—	—		Stimela
"Kiti"	"Djibril Cisse & Dj Peet"	2020	—	—	—	—	—	—	—		Non-album songs
"Pareke"	"Yung Felix"	2020	—	—	—	—	—	—	—		Non-album songs
"Pure Water"	"Dj Spinall ft Wurld & Niniola"	2020	—	—	—	—	—	—	—		Grace
"Squander"	"Falz ft Niniola"	2020	—	—	—	—	—	—	—		Non-album songs
"Gbese Remix"	"Qdot ft Niniola"	2020	—	—	—	—	—	—	—		Alagbe
"Opelenge"	"Sun el ft Niniola"	2020	—	—	—	—	—	—	—		To The World And Beyond
"Lucy Remix"	"Eltee ft Niniola"	2020	—	—	—	—	—	—	—		Non-album songs
"Jolo"	"Yemisi Fancy ft Niniola"	2021	—	—	—	—	—	—	—		Non-album songs
"Don't go"	"Lady Jaydee ft Niniola"	2021	—	—	—	—	—	—	—		20
"Scopa Tu Mana"	"Mz kiss ft Niniola"	2021	—	—	—	—	—	—	—		Non-album songs
High Class	Ice Prince	2026									
"—" denotes a recording that did not chart or was not released in that territory.

== Music videos ==
List of music videos as lead and featured artist, showing year released and directors
Title	Year	Director(s)
"Ibadi"	2014	Adasa Cookey
"Akara Oyibo"	2015	Adasa Cookey
"Soke"	2015	Adasa Cookey
"Shaba"	2016	Adasa Cookey
"J’ètè"	2016	"Bryan Dike"
"Jigi Jigi"	2016	"Bryan Dike"
"Carry Am Go (Remix)" (Damz feat. Olamide & Niniola)	2016	MEX
"Mbilo Mbilo (Remix)" (Eddy Kenzo feat. Niniola)	2016	MEX
"Ojukokoro" (DJ Spinall feat. Niniola)	2017	Genius Adams Gud
"Maradona"	2017	MEX
"Sicker"	2017	Clarence Peters
"Gbe Seyin" (Yung6ix feat. Niniola)	2017	Unlimited L.A
"Saro"	2018	Clarence Peters
"Oyin"	2018	Clarence Peters
"Magun"	2018	Clarence Peters
"Lazaro" (Muungu Africa feat. Niniola, Busiswa)	2018	Kyle White Tv
"Let them talk" (Heavy K feat. Niniola, Ntombi)	2018	Garth Von Glehn
"Maradona Riddim" (Dj Snake & Niniola)	2018	Daniel Mewell Haufman
"Monini" (Dj Fortee feat. Niniola)	2018	Unami Visuals
"Magun Remix" (Niniola feat. Busiswa)	2018	Clarence Peters
"Legbegbe Remix" (Mr Real feat. Niniola, Dj Maphorisa, Vista, Dj Catzico)	2018	Sesan
"Bana"	2018	Clarence Peters
"Designer" (Niniola feat. Sarz)	2019	Sesan
"One More Night" (Mr P feat. Niniola)	2019	Godfather Productions
"Boda Sodiq"	2019	Clarence Peters
"Omo Rapala"	2020	Adasa Cookey
"On My Mind"	2020	Avalon Okpe
"Fantasy" (Niniola feat. Femi Kuti)	2020	Sesan
"Addicted"	2020	Adasa Cookey
"Look Like Me"	2020	Clarence Peters
"Innocent (fagbo)"	2021	Adasa Cookey
"Promise"	2021	Mike Ndika & Ritzy
"Ryde"	2021	Sesan
"Too Sweet (O Dun)"	2021	Sesan
"I Did It (Bum Bum)"	2021	Clarence Peters
"Want"	2022	Crane Studios
"Fuku"	2022	Crane Studios
"Memories"	2023	Clarence Peters
"All Eyes On Me"	2023	Director Pink
"Ibaasi"	2023	Papon (singer)
