= Titilope Sonuga =

Nigerian engineer, actress, and poet (born 1985)

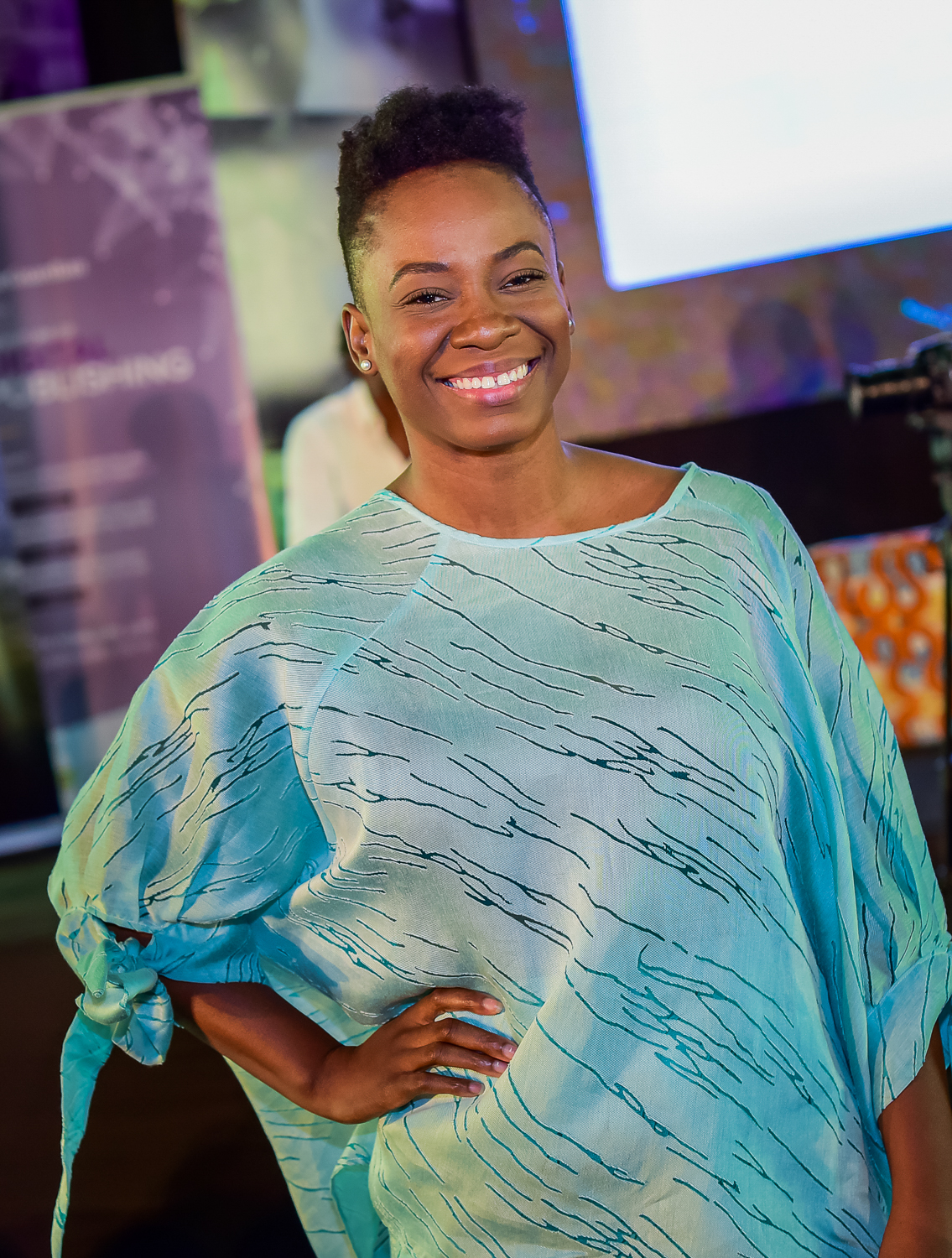
- Sonuga in 2017
- Born: 1985 (age 40–41); Lagos, Nigeria
- Occupations: Poet, civil engineer, actress

Titilope "Titi" Sonuga (Yoruba: Títílọpẹ́ Sónúgà,) is a Nigerian poet, civil engineer, and actress who spends her time between Lagos, Nigeria and Edmonton, Canada.

== Early years ==
Titilope Sonuga, who was born in Lagos, Nigeria, relocated to Edmonton, Canada, when she was 13 years old. Sonuga spent five years working as an engineer while pursuing her interests in poetry and performing in her free time.

== Poetry ==
Sonuga won the 2011 Canadian Authors Association Emerging Writer Award and the 2012 Maya Angelou Poetry Contest. She established Rouge Poetry in Edmonton, a poetry slam series. In May 2015, she became the first poet to appear at a Nigerian presidential inauguration. She published a poetry collection in 2016. Sonuga has performed in the Lagos International Poetry Festival. She was named Edmonton's ninth poet laureate.

== Other works ==
Aside from poetry, Sonuga has dabbled in acting and portrays Eki in the second series of NdaniTV's hit series Gidi Up with OC Ukeje, Deyemi Okanlawon, Somkele Iyamah, and Ikechukwu Onunaku. She also works as Intel’s ambassador for the She Will Connect Program across Nigeria. She wrote the critically acclaimed musical "Ada the Country" which was staged at the Agip Recital Hall of MUSON Center from Jan 2, 2020.

== Personal life ==
In 2015, she announced her engagement to photographer Seun Williams. She has since become a mother.

== See also ==
- List of Nigerian actors
