= Tuer =

Tuer is a surname. Notable people with the surname include:

- Al Tuer (born 1963), Canadian ice hockey player
- Andrew White Tuer (1838–1900), British publisher, writer and printer
- Sheila Mary Tuer (1924–2012), British educator
