= Ariyo =

Àríyọ̀
- Gender: Male and Female
- Language: Yoruba

Origin
- Origin: Nigerian
- Meaning: One we see and rejoice
- Region of origin: South-West Nigeria

Ariyo audio refers to Àríyọ̀ which is a Nigerian given name and surname of Yoruba origin, which means "One we see and rejoice".

== Notable people bearing the name ==
- Onos Ariyo Nigerian base Singer
- Adeola Ariyo
- Roosa Ariyo Nigerian professional footballer.
