= The Department (film) =

2015 film by Remi Vaughn-Richards

- Theatrical release poster
- Directed by: Remi Vaughan-Richards
- Written by: Chinaza Onuzo
- Produced by: Uduak Oguamanam; Chinaza Onuzo
- Starring: Majid Michel; OC Ukeje; Desmond Elliot; Osas Ighodaro; Jide Kosoko; Seun Akindele; Somkele Iyamah
- Cinematography: Ayoola Ireyomi
- Edited by: Niyi Akinmolayan
- Production companies: Inkblot Productions; Closer Pictures
- Distributed by: FilmOne Distributions
- Release date: 30 January 2015
- Running time: 104 minutes
- Country: Nigeria
- Language: English

The Department is a 2015 Nigerian romantic crime action film directed by Remi Vaughan-Richards, starring Majid Michel, OC Ukeje, Desmond Elliot, Osas Ighodaro, Jide Kosoko, Seun Akindele, Somkele Iyamah, Funky Mallam and Kenneth Okolie The film which is the first feature film from Inkblot Productions and Closer Pictures, produced by Uduak Oguamanam and Chinaza Onuzo.

The film tells the story of a secret department in a business conglomerate, as its gang members blackmail top executives into selling their companies to the leader of the conglomerate (Jide Kosoko). Two lovers (Majid Michel and Osas Ighodaro) however opt out of the organization, but the group wants her back for one last job. She accepts against her husband's will, who consequently decides to sabotage the department in order to save their marriage.

== Cast ==
- OC Ukeje - as Segun
- Majid Michel - as Nnamdi
- Jide Kosoko - as Chief Yinka Salako
- Udoka Oyeka - as James Okolo
- Osas Ighodaro - as Tolu Okoye
- Desmond Elliot - as Effiong
- Kenneth Okolie - as Moses
- Carl Erikson - as Jeremy Watts
- Janet Uduma - as Reporter
- Eddie Essang - as Chijioke
- Nkem Miracle - as Aramide
- Seun Akindele - as Hakeem
- Somkele Iyamah - as Ireti
- Magnus Nwachukwu - as Policeman
- Saheed Funky Mallam - as Shehu Aminu

== Release ==
A theatrical trailer for The Department was released on 29 December 2014. The film had a press screening on 20 January 2015 at Filmhouse Cinemas in Surulere, Lagos; it was reportedly well received by the critics at the event. It premiered on 25 January 2015, and was theatrically released on 30 January 2015.

== Reception ==
Nollywood Reinvented rated the film 62%, praising the story and the performances, but noted that the film lacks emotional connection with the viewers; it commented "With a stellar cast and its not-the-usual storyline, The Department aspires to so much and achieves a lot but it does not achieve it all. The movie did great work with the little details, however, together the finished work falls flat and will probably be forgotten by your next breakfast". Folasewa Olatunde praised the performances in the film, but talked down on some unrealistic parts of the film. She concludes that the film is "intriguing and suspense filled".
