= Dumebi Iyamah =

Nigerian-Canadian fashion designer

Dumebi Andrea Iyamah
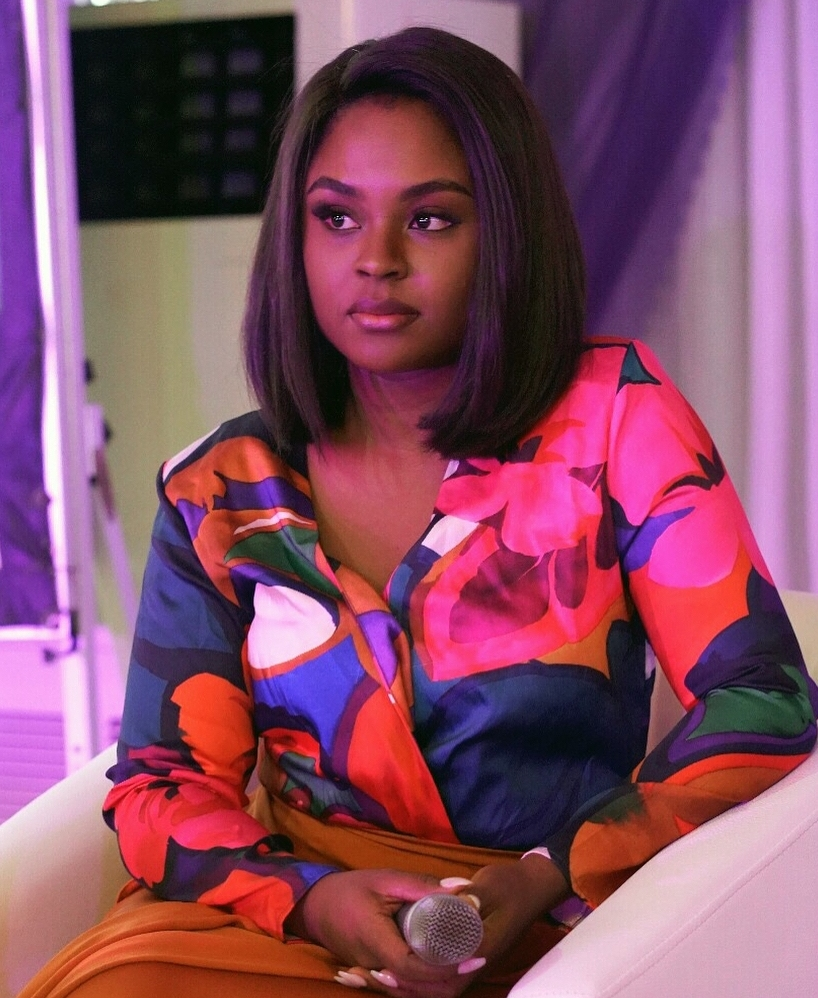
- Born: 18 March 1993 (age 33); Lagos, Nigeria
- Other name: Andrea
- Education: McMaster University
- Occupation: Fashion Designer
- Known for: Founder and head designer of Andrea Iyamah
- Parent(s): Andy Nkwor Iyamah, Onyi Iyamah

Dumebi Andrea Iyamah (born 18 March 1993) is a Nigerian-Canadian fashion designer born and raised in Lagos, Nigeria. She is the founder and CEO of the fashion label Andrea Iyamah that caters to bridal, swimwear and ready-to-wear lines. She is known for her take on women's fashion and swimwear, which has been worn by celebrities such as Michelle Obama, Kate Hudson, Gabrielle Union, Ciara, and Issa Rae.

== Early life and education ==
Iyamah was born in Lagos, to Andrew and Onyi Iyamah both of Ika (Agbor) origin as the fourth of four children. She attended Grange School in Lagos.

She holds a bachelor's degree in Communication and Multimedia from McMaster University. She began her fashion brand in Ontario Canada during her study at McMaster University at the age of 17. She founded the fashion brand with the help and support of her family and close friends.

== Career ==
Iyamah started building her fashion brand Andrea Iyamah at the age of 17. The headquarters of "Andrea Iyamah" is in Toronto, with a flagship store in Lagos which was launched in 2017 In her early days of blogging, she shared her works of art including fashion sketches, portrait drawings, and photography with the digital audience. One of her designs was featured in a popular blog post in 2011 which inspired the creation of "Andrea Iyamah." She worked on her business while pursuing undergraduate studies, starting out with designing custom couture from clients. She refined the brand to diversify into three main streams, custom bridal, ready-to-wear and swim/resort wear. Officially launching a full swim collection in 2013, her work has garnered attention from press such as Vogue, Elle, Essence, Refinery29, HuffPost, Cosmopolitan and much more.

She has staged several fashion shows in Africa, Europe, France, and the United States with major celebrities such as Michelle Obama, Kate Hudson, Ciara, Gabrielle Union, Genevieve Nnaji among others wearing her designs. She showed her Spring/Summer 2020 line at Lagos Fashion Week 2019.

== Personal life ==
Iyamah is the last child of four children born to Andrew and Onyi Iyamah. Her father was an engineer by education and her mother was a beautician who owned a hair salon, clothing boutique. At the time she was born, both parents were entrepreneurs, owning their businesses. At the age of 7, she lost her father and was raised by her mother. Her sister, actress Somkele Iyamah, is a director of the Andrea Iyamah fashion brand.
