= The Guest (2017 film) =

- Directed by: Christian Olayinka
- Produced by: Foluke Olaniyi
- Starring: Rita Dominic; Femi Jacobs; Somkele Iyamah Chika Chukwu
- Production company: The Audrey Silva Company
- Release date: 2017
- Country: Nigeria
- Language: English

The Guest is a 2017 Nigerian film produced and written by Foluke Olaniyi and directed by Christian Olayinka.

== Plot ==
The film gives insight on how a married couple was enjoying their lovely marriage until a friend who is a lady got deported from England. She lived with them and caused havoc to their marriage by having an affair with the man.

== Cast ==
- Rita Dominic
- Femi Jacobs
- Somkele Iyamah
- Chika Chukwu
