= ZR-7: The Red House Seven =

- Directed by: Udoka Oyeka; Olufemi D. Ogunsanwo
- Written by: Olufemi D. Ogunsanwo; Udoka Oyeka
- Produced by: Olufemi D. Ogunsanwo; Udoka Oyeka
- Starring: Norbert Young; Ayinla O. Abdulakeem; Rilwan Mohammed; Yakubu Abashiya; Ife Komolafe; Adeyemi Okanlawon; Udoka Oyeka
- Cinematography: Kagho C. Idhebor
- Edited by: Chidi Nwaozomudoh
- Music by: Ore 'Re Olunuga & People's Army Band
- Production companies: AppleGazer & Karmacause Productions
- Release date: August 19, 2011
- Country: Nigeria
- Language: English

ZR-7: The Red House Seven is a Nigerian drama film written, directed and produced by the duo of Olufemi D. Ogunsanwo & Udoka Oyeka; starring Norbert Young, Ayinla O. Abdulakeem, Yakubu Abashiya, Adeyemi Okanlawon, Rilwan Mohammed, Ife Komolafe and Udoka Oyeka. The film was nominated for an African Academy award at the 2012 Africa Movie Academy Awards.

== Plot ==
The story is a classic life of boarding school adventure involving TJ with six of his friends while in 7th grade. The boys are initially shocked by all the hoops they have to jump in order to survive teachers, prefects, wicked seniors, dining hall food, thieves, cutting grass, washing toilets and all the other regular experiences anyone in a public Nigerian boarding school would experience. But when TJ and the boys accidentally see a man and two female students in a compromising position, what they do with that information is not their only problem in school, but the resulting scandal would change their lives far beyond their wildest dreams.

== Cast ==
- Norbert Young - Minister of Education
- Ayinla O. Abdulakeem - Little TJ
- Yakubu Abashiya - Victor Essien
- Fakiyesi Ayotola - Fab two
- Kafari David - Fab one
- Ubandawaki Basit - Chiedu
- Samy Eddi - Arinze
- Kelvin Maduoku - Anthony Kelechi
- Rilwan Mohammed - Rolly D
- Ife Komolafe - Vicky
- Adeyemi Okanlawon - Mr. Alabi
- Udoka Oyeka - Older TJ
- Bakare Mubarak - Toks
