= Mayflower School =

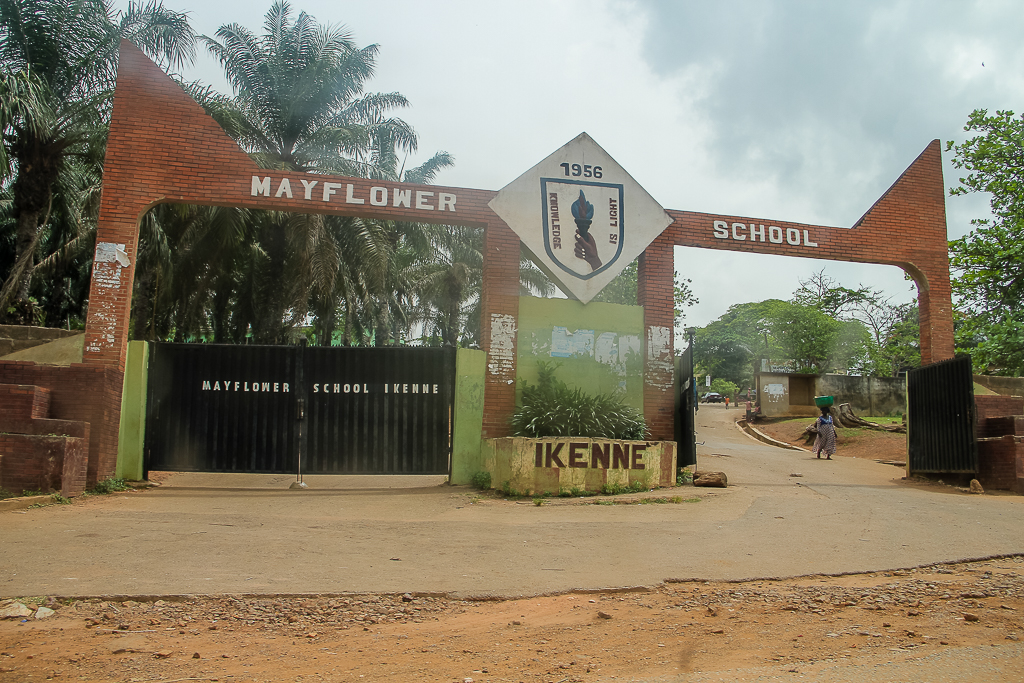
- Mayflower Secondary School, Ikenne, Ogun State
- Ikenne, Ogun State; Nigeria

Information
- Motto: Knowledge is Light
- Established: 27 January 1956
- Founder: Tai Solarin
- Gender: coeducational
- Enrollment: ca. 1,000
- Website: mayflowerprivateschool.com

Mayflower School is a school in Ikenne, Ogun State, Nigeria. It was founded on 27 January 1956 by Tai Solarin, a Nigerian educator, humanist and civil rights pioneer. Solarin was married to Sheila Mary Tuer, an English woman; they had two children Corin and Tunde Solarin. The school is located on 90 acres of land in Ikenne, Ogun State, Nigeria. It is named after the historical Mayflower ship that brought the first batch of pilgrims to the United States. Like the pilgrims, Solarin founded the school in personal rebellion against religious persecution.

Mayflower preaches a strong educational philosophy grounded in self-reliance, self-sacrifice, public service and physical toughness. In Solarin's words, the students must be "rugged." Since the school was first established, in the boarding house, female students are forbidden from using any form of cosmetics. A rigorous, military-style living regimen requires that every student wake up at 5:00 am for physical exercise including running and in-field stretches. In his days, Dr. Solarin would often be the first to show up for these exercises. He urged his students to always "lead by example."

The school's motto is "Knowledge is Light" and it is noted for the outstanding quality of its graduates, many of whom are leaders in Nigeria and abroad.

Every student is taught the basics of rudimentary and mechanized farming as part of a well rounded, self-sustaining education.

The students wear a uniform styled after Tai Solarin's trademark apparel —simple khaki shorts and short-sleeve shirts. This applies to both male and female students. Graduates of the school are called "Ex-Mays."

The school's alumni includes the first national female chemical engineer.

== History ==
When Mayflower School opened on 27 January 1956, it had 70 students, and in 1992, it had 1,900, including more than 800 girls. Tai Solarin was its principal from 1956 to 1976.

In 1962, 13 American college and university students spent June and July at Mayflower under the sponsorship of Operation Crossroads Africa. Led by the then College Chaplain of Alma College, the students worked with counterpart students from Wesley College, Ibadan, to construct a building that would serve as a library for the school. As a consequence of the Crossroads experience, a relationship was formed between Alma and Mayflower School. Between 1963 and 1988, annually, an Alma College student spent the year as a teacher at Mayflower. In the course of the relationship several Mayflower students studied at, and graduated from, Alma College; and Tai Solarin was awarded the college's honorary degree.

Plans are in motion to mark the school's 70th anniversary by the Mayflower Old Students' Association (MOWA).

== Notable alumni ==
- Oladapo Afolabi, former Head of Service of the Federation of Nigeria
- William Kumuyi, founder Deeper Christian Life Ministry
- Dayo Amusa, actress and singer
- Richard Bamisile, politician
- Tunji Disu, Police Officer
- DO2dTUN, on-air personality, video jockey, actor and media entrepreneur
- Chude Jideonwo, lawyer, journalist and media entrepreneur
- Anthony Joshua, world heavyweight champion boxer
- Pepenazi, songwriter, recording artiste and performer
- Isio De-laVega Wanogho, supermodel, columnist, painter, and Interior architect
