= Bumi Thomas =

Scottish-Nigerian singer-songwriter (born 1983)

- Born: 1983 (age 41–42); Glasgow, Scotland
- Occupation(s): Singer-songwriter and guitarist

Bumi Thomas (born 1983) is a Scottish-Nigerian jazz-folk-soul singer-songwriter and guitarist. She was born in Glasgow, Scotland, but grew up in Nigeria. Now London-based, and frequently found performing in smaller venues around the city, she released her debut EP, Feather Pearl, in November 2014.

== Life ==
Thomas was born in Glasgow, Scotland, in June 1983.

== Career ==
Thomas is known for songs such as "Free As a Bird", which she has performed live on BBC Radio, "My Baby (Hole in the Sky)", "Walk with Me" and "Don't Lie to Me". Her songs tend to be centred on themes of "journey and expression". She has performed with the likes of Kenny Thomas, Muntu Valdo, Nneka, Shingai Shoniwa of the Noisettes, Keziah Jones and Tony Allen, and is often found performing in cafes, bars and jazz clubs in London, though she appeared on the stage in the Royal Opera House. Her debut EP, Feather Pearl, was released in November 2014.

In October 2015, she appeared at the London Felabration 2015 with the Dele Sosimi Afrobeat Orchestra and artists such as Breis, Temi Dollface, Afrikan Boy, Tiggs da Author, and others.

== Personal life ==
Thomas resides in London. She has said of her heritage: "My experience in Nigeria as a woman of Yoruba and Igbo heritage living in Hausaland has shaped me. Though I still retain aspects of my experiences of early childhood; I had a thick Glaswegian accent when we moved to Kano and still retain the Scottish attitude about being less uptight about life."

Thomas was threatened by deportation because she was born in the UK in 1983. Her elder sister did not receive this threat. The campaign to assert her rights attracted more than 25,000 signatures.

In August 2020, Glasgow born Thomas was granted indefinite leave to remain in the UK.
