= Isio Wanogho =

Nigerian supermodel, columnist, painter and interior architect

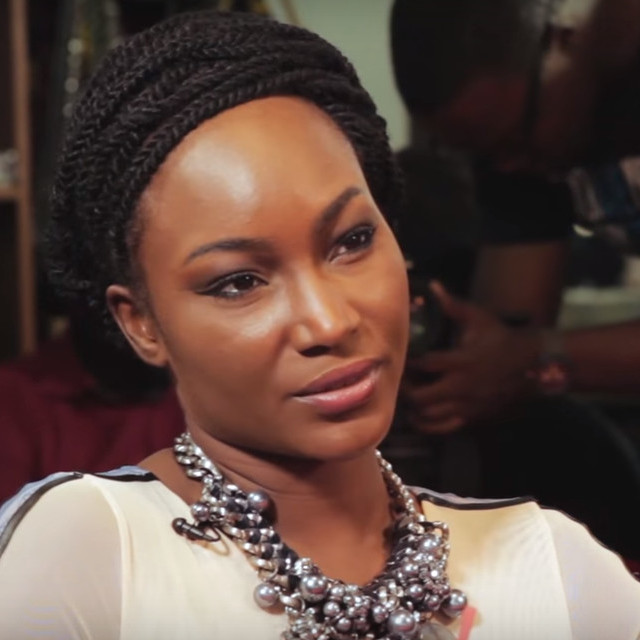
Isio Wanogho

Isio Wanogho (born November 17, 1983) is a Nigerian supermodel, columnist, painter, and interior architect. She began modeling in 2002.

== Early life ==
Wanogho was born in Nigeria. She attended Mayflower School, where completed her primary and secondary education, and proceeded to Paris, France, where she earned an M.Sc in Interior Design. In 2008, Wanogho earned her B.A in Painting and Sculpture from the University of Dundee. Her artworks were influenced by Yoruba culture.

== Career ==
Wanogho was discovered by model scout Otu Winpana on her way home from private lessons. She participated and was a finalist in the 2002 QueenAfrik beauty pageant. In 2015, Wanogho was named the campaign ambassador for DIESEL as well as the face of company.

Wanogho began presenting in 2006. She became the presenter of Soundcity's affiliate fashion station, Spice TV, in 2009 and founded Isio De-laVega Design Studios (IDDS) in 2012. Wanogho has received several awards including the 2010 The FAB Awards for Best Presenter, the 2010 African Youth Society Role Model Award, and the 2010 NMAA Best Model-Presenter award. In 2014, Wanogho appeared on Ndani TV's Gidi Up and Badt Guy.

== Awards and nominations ==
- 2011: African youth Society: Honorary achievement award and African role Model
- 2010: FAB International magazine, Model of the Year
- 2010: Nigerian Model Achievers Award: Best TV Presenter
- 2009: The Future Awards Africa - model of the year finalist
- 2010: The Future Awards nominee for TV presenter of the year
- 2009: Exquisite magazine finalist - female TV presenter of the year
- 2017: YNaija/Leading Ladies Africa's 100 Most Inspiring Women in Nigeria
