= Niniola =

Nigerian singer-songwriter (born 1986)

- Niniola in 2019
- Born: Niniola Apata; December 15, 1986 (age 39); Lagos State, Nigeria
- Occupations: Singer, songwriter, performer
- Years active: 2014 – present
- Musical career
- Genres: Afrobeats; afropiano; folk; house; amapiano; dancehall
- Instrument: Vocals
- Website: officialniniola.com

Niniola Apata (born 15 December 1986), known professionally as Niniola, is a Nigerian singer and songwriter. She participated in the sixth season of Project Fame West Africa in 2013 After releasing her debut single "Ibadi", she was nominated for Most Promising Act to Watch at the 2015 Nigeria Entertainment Awards.

== Early life ==
Niniola Apata was born to the family of Rt. Brigadier General Simeon Olaosebikan Apata and Mrs. Margaret Apata on 15 December 1986 and raised in Lagos State, Nigeria. She is the direct elder sister to Teni.

== Education ==
Niniola began her education both primary and secondary school education at Apata Memorial High School, and she earned a bachelor of education certificate from the University of Lagos. She comes from a polygamous family where she was the sixth of ten children, raised by three mothers and a father who was killed in 1995.

== Career ==
Niniola participated in several social activities and competitions while attending secondary school. She finished third runner-up in the sixth season of Project Fame West Africa. During the competition, she performed a live rendition of "Limpopo" with Kcee and her Cobhams Asuquo-produced track "Itura". She has cited Dolly Parton, Whitney Houston, Celine Dion, The Cranberries, Madonna, Beyoncé and Angélique Kidjo as her key musical influences.

Niniola released her debut single "Ibadi" on 19 March 2014. Produced by Sarz, the song received positive critical reviews, topped national music charts and gained extensive airplay. Her singles "Ibadi" and "Gbowode" were included in the soundtrack for season 2 of Gidi Up. NotJustOk included her on its list of the 15 Artists to Watch in 2015. Niniola was nominated in the Most Promising Act to Watch category at the 2015 Nigeria Entertainment Awards.

Niniola released the Sarz-produced single "Maradona" in 2017. The song spent 13 weeks on South Africa's Metro FM chart, retaining the number 1 position for 6 weeks. Niniola earned nominations at the 2018 BET Awards and SAMAs for "Maradona". In 2018 DJ Snake teamed up with Niniola and created Maradona Riddim a remix to her previously released hit Maradona. She received nods from Canadian rapper Drake and American record producer Timbaland.

In 2019, elements of "Maradona" were sampled in "Find Your Way Back", a song from Beyoncé's soundtrack album The Lion King: The Gift. Niniola is also credited as one of the track's songwriters and composers.

In April 2020, she received her Grammy nomination certificate for her work as a composer on The Lion King: The Gift.

In June 2021, she received her Grammy second nomination certificate for her work as a composer on The Lion King: The Gift. In the same month Niniola got inducted into the Grammy Recording Academy Class of 2021.

In July 2021, Niniola's single, "Maradona" was certified gold in South Africa by the Recording Industry of South Africa RISA.

In January 2023, Niniola's single, "Maradona" was certified Platinum in South Africa by the Recording Industry of South Africa RISA.

== Artistry ==
As of 2018 Niniola's style of music was described according to BET as "a mixture of afrobeats and house music". Though later as recent as 2020 her signature style of music would later include Amapiano becoming the first Nigerian to release a song with amapiano logdrums. As of 2022 some sources would also later categorize her sound as "afropiano" a fusion style of music which combines afrobeats and amapiano. During an interview with Gbolahan Adeyemi of NGWide in 2015, Niniola expressed her fondness for singing in Yoruba, citing that it enhances the beauty of song delivery.

== Personal life ==
Niniola is the older sister of singer Teniola.

In May 2026, Niniola announced the death of her husband, Michael Ndika, revealing for the first time that the couple had been privately married for 13 years. Ndika had served since 2011 as CEO of NaijaReview, an Afrobeats and Afro-house media platform; the cause of his death was not disclosed. In the weeks that followed, Niniola spoke publicly about grieving as a young widow.

== Discography ==
=== Collaborative albums and EPs ===
- This is Me (2017)
- Colours and Sounds (2020)
- 6th Heaven (EP) (2021)
- Lagos to Jozi (EP) (2021)
- Press Play (2024)

== Selected awards and nominations ==
| Year | Award ceremony | Prize | Result | Ref |
|---|---|---|---|---|
| 2015 | Nigeria Entertainment Awards | Most Promising Act to Watch | Nominated | |
| 2015 | Nigerian Achievers Award | Best Promising Female Artist of The Year | Nominated | |
| 2015 | Lagos Fashion Awards | Most Fashionable Fast Rising Music Star Of The Year Female | Nominated | |
| 2015 | Scream Awards | Best New Act Female | Nominated | |
| 2015 | City People Entertainment Awards | Most Promising Act of the Year (Female) | Nominated | |
| 2016 | ACI Awards | New Artist Of The Year | Nominated | |
| 2016 | Nigeria Entertainment Awards | Best New Act | Nominated | |
| 2016 | All Africa Music Awards | Best Female Artiste in West Africa | Nominated | |
| 2016 | All Africa Music Awards | Best Artiste/Duo/Group In African RnB & Soul | Nominated | |
| 2016 | All Africa Music Awards | Songwriter of the Year In Africa for "Mbilo Mbilo" (Remix) | Nominated | |
| 2016 | All Africa Music Awards | Best African Collaboration for "Mbilo Mbilo" (Remix) | Won | |
| 2016 | Nigerian Music Video Awards | Best RnB Video for "Akara Oyibo" | Nominated | |
| 2016 | ELOY Awards | Upcoming Female Music Artist | Nominated | |
| 2016 | Soundcity MVP Awards Festival | Best Collaboration for "Mbilo Mbilo" (Remix) | Nominated | |
| 2016 | Soundcity MVP Awards Festival | Best New Artiste | Nominated | |
| 2016 | Top Naija Music Award | Artiste of the Year | Nominated | |
| 2017 | Nigeria Entertainment Awards | Best Afropop Female Artiste | Nominated | |
| 2017 | AFRIMMA | Best Newcomer | Nominated | |
| 2017 | City People Entertainment Awards | Music Artiste Of The Year Female | Nominated | |
| 2017 | Nigerian Teens Choice Awards | Choice Female Vocalist of the Year | Won | |
| 2017 | All Africa Music Awards | Best Artiste African Electro | Nominated | |
| 2017 | Soundcity MVP Awards Festival | Best Female MVP | Nominated | |
| 2017 | Soundcity MVP Awards Festival | Best Pop | Nominated | |
| 2017 | Soundcity MVP Awards Festival | Listener's Choice | Nominated | |
| 2018 | Maya Awards (Africa) | Youth Artiste of The Year | Won | |
| 2018 | Glazia Awards | Glazia Persons of The Year | Won | |
| 2018 | The Headies | Best R&B/Pop Album | Nominated | |
| 2018 | The Headies | Best Vocal Performance (Female) | Nominated | |
| 2018 | The Headies | Hip Hop World Revelation of the Year | Nominated | |
| 2018 | South African Music Awards | Best African Artist Album | Nominated | |
| 2018 | BET Awards | Viewers Choice Best New International Act | Nominated | |
| 2018 | IARA Awards | Best International Female Artist | Nominated | |
| 2018 | Ghana-Naija Showbiz Awards | Best Female Act | Won | |
| 2018 | Nigeria Entertainment Awards | Afropop Female Artist | Nominated | |
| 2018 | The Future Awards | The Future Awards Africa Prize in Music | Nominated | |
| 2018 | Soundcity MVP Awards Festival | Viewer's Choice | Nominated | |
| 2018 | Soundcity MVP Awards Festival | Best Female MVP | Nominated | |
| 2019 | African Music Magazine Awards | Best Female West Africa | Nominated | |
| 2019 | All Africa Music Awards | Best Female West Africa | Nominated | |
| 2019 | All Africa Music Awards | Best Artiste, Duo or Group in African Electro | Nominated | |
| 2019 | All Africa Music Awards | Best African Dance or Choreography | Nominated | |
| 2021 | MTV AFRICA MUSIC AWARDS (MAMAs) | “Alone Together” Best Lockdown Performance | Nominated | |
| 2021 | The Headies | Best Vocal Performance (Female) | Won | |
| 2021 | All Africa Music Awards | Best Female Artist in Western Africa | Nominated | |
| 2021 | All Africa Music Awards | Best Artist, Duo or Group In African Electro - "Addicted" | Nominated | |
| 2021 | African Entertainment Awards USA (AEAUSA) | Best Female Artist | Nominated | |
| 2022 | The Headies | Best Vocal Performance (Female) "6th Heaven" | Nominated | |
| 2022 | The Headies | Best R&B Single "Promise" | Nominated | |
| 2022 | The Headies | Best Female Artiste | Nominated | |

== See also ==
- List of Nigerian musicians
