= Yvonne Ekwere =

Nigerian media personality and actress (born 1987)

- Born: Yvonne Imoh-Abasi Glory Ekwere; March 3, 1987 (age 39); Lagos State, Nigeria
- Education: Lagos State University
- Occupations: on-air personality; TV presenter; film actress
- Years active: 2008–present

Yvonne Imoh-Abasi Glory Ekwere (Igbo pronunciation; born March 3, 1987), popularly known as Yvonne Vixen Ekwere, is a Nigerian media personality, content producer and actress who works as the presenter of E-Weekly on Silverbird Television. Since making her debut as a co-host on a late night show on Rhythm 93.7 FM, her style of presenting has seen her win several awards.

== Early life and education ==
Vixen is a native of Akwa Ibom State, Nigeria, but she was born as the last of 7 children in Lagos State, Southwestern Nigeria where she completed her basic and secondary school education at Airforce Primary School, Victoria Island, Lagos and Holy Child College, Lagos respectively. She holds a bachelor's degree in History and International Studies which she obtained from Lagos State University.

== Career ==
=== Radio/TV career ===
Her career started in 2008 after she was invited by Ikponmwosa Osakioduwa to be the co-host of a radio show called Dance Party which airs on Rhythm 93.7 FM. Vixen later auditioned and won the role as presenter of Silverbird Television's entertainment show E-Weekly. Her career has since seen her interview notable celebrities and hosted several high-profile events including Most Beautiful Girl in Nigeria 2012 and former President, Goodluck Jonathan's "Dinner With Showbiz Stakeholders" amongst others. In October 2015, she launched her own web series show called Drive Time with Vixen. She cites Oprah Winfrey as her source of inspiration. She Interview Genevieve Nnaji, Funke Akindele, Denrele Edun & More on their Journey to Success at the 2014 Amstel Malta AMVCA.

=== Films and soaps ===
She has starred and made appearances in films and soap operas including 7 Inch Curve, Render to Caesar, Put a Ring on It, and the season 2 of Gidi Up where she starred in 3 episodes.

== Awards and recognitions ==
Year	Award ceremony	Prize	Result
2009	Future Awards	TV Personality of the Year	Nominated
2010	Future Awards	TV Personality of the Year	Nominated
2010	FAB Awards	TV Personality of the Year	Nominated
2011	FAB Awards	TV Personality of the Year	Won
2011	Future Awards	TV Personality of the Year	Nominated
2011	ELOY Awards 2011	TV Personality of the Year	Won
2011	The Nigerian Events Awards	Best Event Coverage	Won
2012	City People Fashion Awards 2012	Most Stylish TV Presenter of the Year	Won
2013	2013 Nigeria Entertainment Awards	TV Personality of the Year	Nominated
