= Tai Solarin =

Nigerian educator and author (1916–1994)

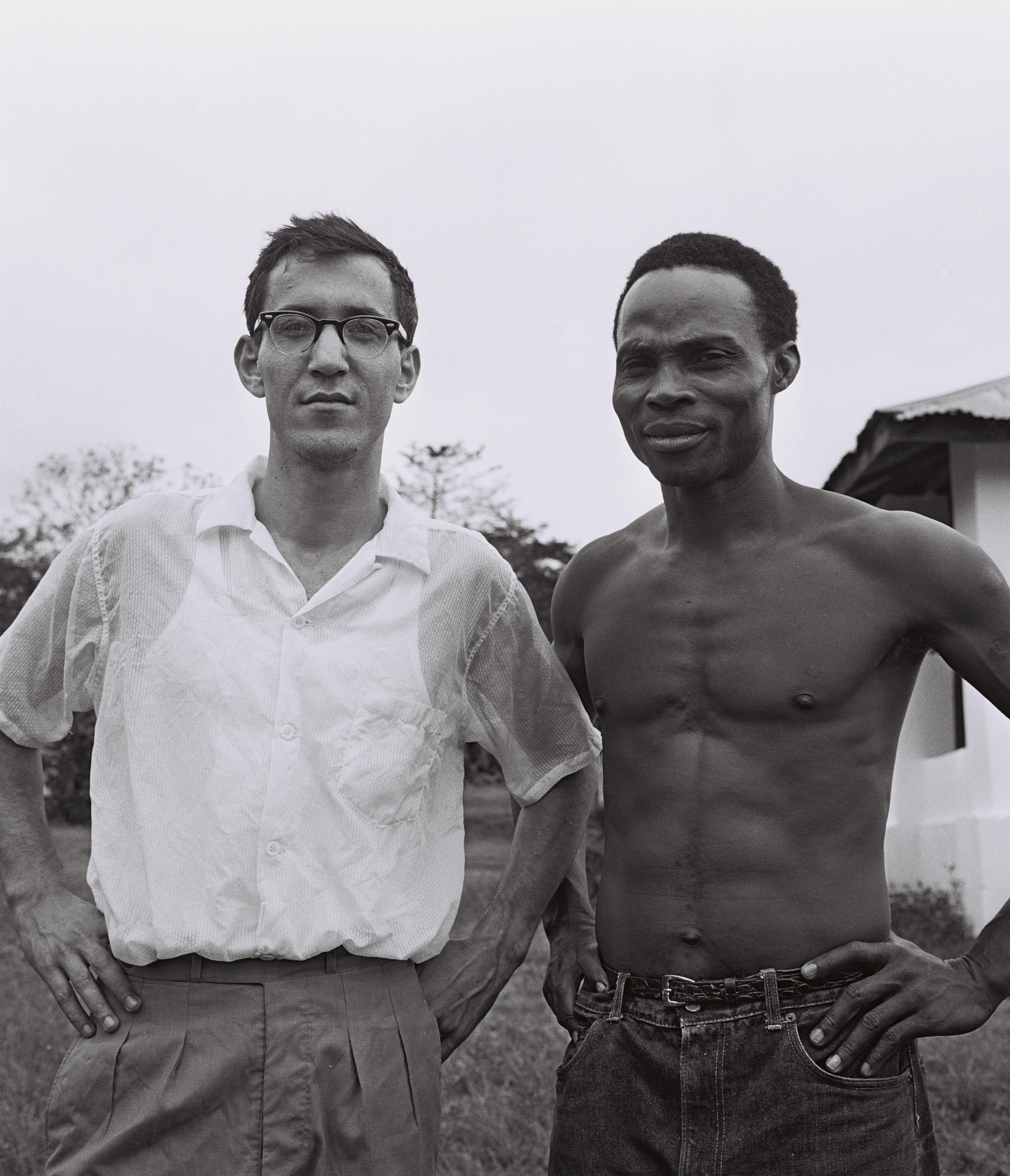
- Tai Solarin, director of the Mayflower school (right), with a guest from Israel in Ikene, Nigeria, 1962.
- Born: Augustus Taiwo Solarin; 20 August 1916; Ikenne, Southern Region, British Nigeria (now in Ogun State, Nigeria)
- Died: 27 July 1994 (aged 77); Ikenne, Ogun State, Nigeria
- Other name: Tai
- Education: Manchester University; University of London
- Occupations: Educator, social activist, author (journalist) first African pilot
- Spouse: Sheila Mary Tuer (m. 1951)
- Children: Corin Solarin; Tunde Solarin

Augustus Taiwo "Tai" Solarin (20 August 1916 – 27 July 1994) was a Nigerian educator and author. He established the famous Mayflower School, Ikenne, Ogun State in 1956. In 1952, Solarin became the principal of Molusi College, Ijebu Igbo, a post he held till 1956 when he became the proprietor and principal of Mayflower School.

== Early life ==
Solarin was born in Ikenne, Ogun State, in Western Nigeria on 20 August 1916, the first child in a set of twins born to Daniel Solarin and Rebecca Okufule Solarin. His twin sister, Caroline Kehinde Solarin died in 1991. He and his sister were the only children of their parents. He attended Wesley College Ibadan. Solarin was inspired by the writings of Nnamdi Azikiwe who encouraged young people to travel abroad for study. His initial attempt to gain a passport fell through but he later enlisted in the British Air Force and served with the Royal Air Force as a navigator in the Second World War. He remained in Britain, studying at University of Manchester, and then at the University of London. Tai Solarin married English-born Sheila Mary Tuer in 1951.

Solarin returned to Nigeria and became a tutor at Molusi College, which was supported by the community and Christians in Ijebu-Igbo. In 1952, he was appointed the school's principal succeeding Stephen Awokoya who had just been appointed the regional Minister for Education. Solarin, a humanist had a mission to 're-educate' the community and decided to make some changes. He removed morning prayers and religious studies as a subject in the school. However, some of the changes found opposition within the local community where his brother was a reverend. He decided to quit and found his own school with the approval of Awokoya the former Principal. He established Mayflower school on 27 January 1956.

== Mayflower ==
The Mayflower campus, which he established, is made up of hundreds of hectares of land, based in Tai Solarin's birthplace, Ikenne, Ogun State. Approximately 15,000 students are in attendance.

The campus includes classrooms, administration buildings, small houses for many of the teachers, dormitory accommodations for about 5,000 boarders, and a farm. The school is noted for very high academic achievement.

== Post independence critics ==
Tai Solarin is one of the post-Independence civil rights critics and activists in his native Nigeria; some others were Fela Anikulapo-Kuti (musician) Beko Ransome-Kuti, Wole Soyinka (Nobel Laureate), Ayodele Awojobi, Dele Giwa, Gani Fawehinmi (lawyer), and Ken Saro-Wiwa. For the majority of the first forty years after independence, Nigeria had no effective opposition to the mostly military government of the day. These activists acted as an effective opposition to the ruling government. In 1975, when the General Gowon Regime delayed returning power to a civilian regime, Tai published his "The Beginning of the End" statement, which he then physically distributed on the roadside. He was subsequently imprisoned for this act. Throughout his lifetime Tai fought running battles with various governments in a bid to improve the lot of Nigerians.

Mr. Solarin was an intellectual guru for Nigeria's disenchanted and disfranchised for four decades. His writings in magazines and newspapers, highlighting what he called the hypocrisy and vulgarity of the Nigeria of his day, frequently angered people in power.

He was a vehement critic of military rule in Nigeria, Africa's most populous nation, and an ombudsman in three states in 1976 and 1977

As a columnist, Tai was a relentless critic of Nigerian military rule, as well as of corruption in the government and the church. He was often jailed for his public remarks.

== Modesty ==
In a country and an age where dignitaries wore flowing Agbada to show their wealth and position, Tai was known to always wear simple khaki shorts and shirt.

== Quotes ==
'I fight with an indomitable spirit, my back to the wall, defeat is for those who accept it' 'The greatest strands of affection are woven in adversity. Leadership means suffering. The Leader, who has no marks, indelible marks to show either on his physical body or in his mind have never led'. 'How many Socrates did Greece breed? How many Nehru's did India breed? They have one each but they all had one thing in common, sense of mission. An unquenchable thirst to get things done. We need as in this instance only one courageous Nigerian to take a stand. But no Nigerian wants to offer his head to break a coconut'.

== Prophet of self-reliance ==
One of Tai Solarin's basic principles was self-reliance, a part of the curriculum at Mayflower.

== The Peoples Bank ==
In 1989, The Peoples Bank was founded by the government, and Tai Solarin became the first chairman. The bank was created to disburse soft loans and other forms of credit to the very poor to start their own businesses.

== Humanist ==
Tai Solarin was also a well known humanist and atheist who opposed the ownership of the schools by churches. Tai Solarin once said that "black(people) hold onto their God just as the drunken man holds on to the street lamppost—for physical support only." In 2004, the Mayflower School played host to an International Humanist Conference, commemorating the life and work of Tai Solarin. It was attended by guests from the United States, Africa and Europe.

Tai Solarin wrote regularly for the Daily Times, the Nigerian Tribune and The Guardian.

== Tai Solarin University of education ==
In November 2005, the Nigerian National Universities Commission (NUC) formally recognised the "Tai Solarin University of Education" (TASUED) Ogun State, as the first specialised university of education, the 27th state university and the 76th university in Nigeria.

== Works ==
- Towards Nigeria's Moral Self-Government,
- Thinking with You.
- A Message for Young Nigerians.
- To Mother With Love.
- Mayflower; the story of a school.
- Timeless Tai.
