= Sheila Mary Tuer =

British educationalist

Sheila Solarin
- Born: Sheila Mary Tuer; 1924; Lancaster, Lancashire, England
- Died: 21 October 2012 (aged 88); Sagamu, Ogun State, Nigeria
- Occupation: Educator
- Spouse: Tai Solarin (m. 1951)
- Children: Corin Solarin; Tunde Solarin

Sheila Mary Solarin MBE (née Tuer, 1924–21 October 2012) was a British educator. She was awarded an MBE by Queen Elizabeth II on 17 October 2007 for her educational services in Nigeria. She ran the Mayflower School on behalf of her late husband, Tai Solarin.

== Early life ==
Sheila met Tai Solarin while both were in the military forces following World War II. They were married in 1951.

== Career ==
In 1952, Tai and Sheila decided to move to his native Nigeria, where both worked in Ijebu Igbo, Ogun State at Molusi College. However, they disagreed with the politics of the organization and religious discrimination in schools, and decided to build their own school in Ikenne. They left the college in 1956 to pursue their idea.

On 27 January 1956 Tai Solarin and his wife founded the Mayflower School, the first secular school in Nigeria, in Ikenne.

The Students' Second Home was established by the pair in 1977. It was a boarding house that served more than two thousand students of the three public high schools in Ikenne town. Also complementing the now state-owned Mayflower School was the privately owned Mayflower Junior School, the main school of the Mayflower institution.

Using breeze blocks made from clay, they constructed two classrooms, each able to accommodate 36 pupils. The students helped in the construction of more classrooms.

"They had their bunks at the back of the class, and the desks at the front" said Sheila. "We didn't ask anybody what their ethnic background or religion was, we simply wanted to provide an education for all the children in the area."

As the Mayflower School became more popular, Sheila and her husband expanded, making it one of the largest schools in the country.

Sheila headed the Mayflower School on behalf of her late husband Tai Solarin. Sheila retired at the age of 80, passing much of the responsibility for the school to her children.

== Personal life ==
Sheila and her husband had two children, Corin and Tunde Solarin. She died on 21 October 2012, at the age of 88.
