= Deyemi Okanlawon =

Nigerian actor

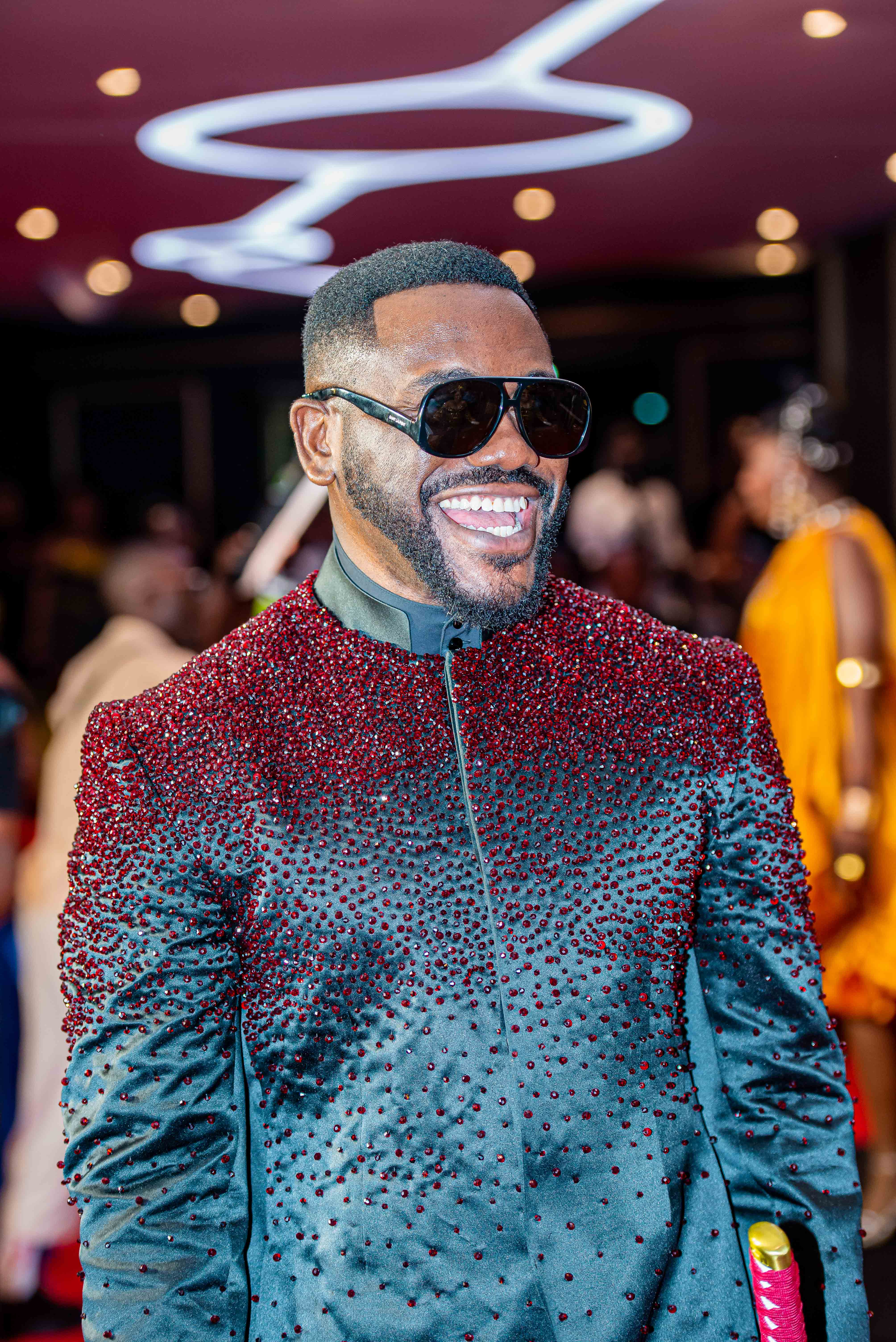
- Portrait of Deyemi Okanlawon at 2026 AMVCA
- Born: Adeyemi Okanlawon; 19 April 1981 (age 45); Lagos State, Nigeria
- Education: Chemical Engineering, Acting For Film
- Alma mater: University of Lagos; Delyork Creative Academy
- Occupation: Actor
- Years active: 2010–present
- Website: www.deyemitheactor.com

Deyemi Okanlawon (born 19 April 1981) is a Nigerian actor. He was the highest-grossing Nollywood actor of 2020 and 2021, according to the Film One Box Office report. Okanlawon is best known for his roles in Netflix Originals, including King of Boys: The Return of the King (2021), Blood Sisters (2022), Elesin Oba: The King's Horseman (2022), and Lisabi: The Uprising (2024), as well as commercially successful films like Omo Ghetto: The Saga (2020), Prophetess (2021), and All's Fair in Love (2024).

== Early life ==
Born in Lagos, Okanlawon is the son of Adeyemi Okanlawon, an aircraft engineer, and Adeyinka Okanlawon, a baker and entrepreneur. He began his education at Taikenny Nursery and Primary School and later attended the International School, Lagos. He also obtained a degree in Chemical engineering from the University of Lagos. Additionally, he earned a Certificate in Acting for Film from the Delyork Creative Academy.

== Career ==
Okanlawon began acting at the age of five in a school play. By the age of nine, he appeared in a nationally aired television commercial alongside Kunle Bamtefa and Sola Sobowale. While studying at the University of Lagos, he became an active participant in drama groups. After graduation, he worked as a sales and marketing executive in industries like FMCG.

In 2011, he made his feature film debut in ZR-7: The Red House Seven and also starred in the short film A Grain of Wheat. He featured in short films and web series, such as Gidi Up, Blink, and Knock Knock. By 2012, he had gained recognition as an actor in Nigeria.

In 2013, Okanlawon made the decision to focus on acting full-time. Since then, he has appeared in over 50 films, TV series, theatre productions, music videos, and commercials. His work has earned him nominations and awards from the Africa International Film Festival (AFRIFF), Africa Movie Academy Awards (AMAA), Africa Magic Viewers Choice Awards (AMVCA), Ghana Movie Awards (GMA), BON, In-Short, and City People awards.

In 2015, Okanlawon founded Covenant Entertainment Services, a full-service production advisory, marketing consulting, and talent management firm. The company later served as a consultant for Silverbird Film Distribution. In 2019, Okanlawon took up the role of marketing manager at Silverbird and then the head of Nollywood and independent movie distribution. In 2020, during the pandemic, he briefly stepped in as acting CEO before returning to acting full-time in 2021.

In 2017, Okanlawon starred in the romantic comedy-drama Scars, directed by Tope Alake, alongside Lilian Esoro and Chelsea Eze, marking his entry into the romantic comedy genre.

In 2020, he played a supporting role in Omo Ghetto: The Saga, which became Nigeria's top-grossing film, earning over ₦187 million, according to the Nigerian Box Office yearbook.

In 2022, Okanlawon appeared in Blood Sisters, Nigeria's first Netflix Original Series, which premiered on 5 May 2022. He also starred in Elesin Oba: The King's Horseman, the first Yoruba-language film to be screened at the Toronto International Film Festival. That same year, he received his first Africa Magic Viewers' Choice Awards (AMVCA) nomination for Best Actor in a comedy for his role in Omo Ghetto: The Saga.

In 2024, after a decade in the industry, Okanlawon applied his sales and marketing expertise and his on-screen experience to produce his debut film, All’s Fair in Love. The romantic comedy, starring Timini Egbuson and Buhle Samuels, was commercially successful, grossing over ₦130 million at the West African box office. The film was also licensed to Prime Video, where it became the second most-watched Nollywood title of 2024.

Okanlawon's second film Three Working Days premiered in Nigerian cinemas on 18 October 2024. Directed by Ikechukwu Jerry Ossai and produced by Bleeding Art Production in collaboration with FilmOne Studios, the film is a heist thriller that follows a father's quest to secure a stable future for his family amid an economic crisis. The cast includes Nancy Isime, Femi Adebayo, Uzor Arukwe and Mike Ezuruonye.

== Personal life ==
Okanlawon got married in January 2013. On 10 July 2016, Okanlawon and his wife Damilola welcomed their first child.

== Filmography ==
Year	Title	Role	Director	Notes
2010	Grain of Wheat	Saviour	Daniel and Ruyi	Lead Role/Short Film
2011	Dependence	Dayo	Brian Wilson	Lead/Short Film
2011	ZR-7: The Red House Seven	Alabi	Udoka Oyeka and Olufemi D. Ogunsanwo	Principal (Feature Film)
2012	6:30PM	Ghost	Tonye Faloughi	Short Film/Supporting Role
2012	Journey to Self	Ex lover	Tope Oshin-Ogun	Feature Film alongside Ashionye Raccah, Katherine Obiang, Dakore Akande, Tina Mba and more
2012	Blink	Husband	Tolu Ajayi	Lead Role/Short Film
2012	Gidi Up Season 1	Tokunbo	Jáde Osiberu	Lead/Series
2013	Kpians: The Feast of Souls	Eric	Stanlee Ohikhuare	Sub-Lead/Feature Film alongside Kiki Omeili and Ashionye Ugboh-Raccah
2013	Kpians Premonition	Eric	Stanlee Ohikhuare	Sub-Lead/Web
2013	Gidi Up II	Tokunbo	Jáde Osiberu	Lead/Series
2013	Oblivious	Charles	Stanlee Ohikhuare	Feature Film
2014	Dowry I	Demola	Victor Sanchez	Lead Role/Series
2014	Lekki Wives III	Hassan	Blessing Egbe	Supporting Role/Series
2014	A Place Called Happy	Dele	LowlaDee	Feature Film
2014	Perfect Imperfection	Kanmi	Ehizojie Ojesebholo	Lead Role/Feature Film
2014	Friends and Lovers	Frank	Yemi Morafa	Feature Film
2014	A Few Good Men	Wale	Ejiro Onobrakpor	Feature Film featuring Joseph Benjamin
2014	Vanity's Last Game	Justin	Ehizojie Ojesebholo	Feature Film
2015	Dowry II	Demola	Victor Sanchez	Feature Film featuring Iretiola Doyle
2015	If Tomorrow Never Comes	Kay	Pascal Amanfo	Feature Film featuring Yvonne Nelson
2015	Road to Yesterday	Michael	Ishaya Bako	Feature Film featuring Majid Michel and Genevieve Nnaji
2015	All of Me	Chris	Okey Ifeanyi	Feature Film
2015	Undercover Lover	Mr Roberts	Okey Ifeanyi	Feature Film
2016	Desperate Housegirls 2 & 3	Femi	Sukanmi Adebayo and Akin-Tijani	Supporting Role/Series
2016	Tobi	Ha.foo.sa	Niyi Akinmolayan	Animated Series
2016	It's About Your Husband	Kay	Bunmi Ajakaiye	Feature Film
2016	Madam Caitlyn	Dr Sam	-	Feature film
2016	Asawana	Sere	Diminas Dagogo	Feature Film
2016	Dinner	Richard 'Richie' Boyo	Jay Franklin Jituboh	Feature Film featuring Iretiola Doyle and Richard Mofe Damijo
2017	The Royal Hibiscus Hotel	Martin	Ishaya Bako	
2018	The Devil in Between	Frank	Pascal Amanfo	Drama
2019	Pandora's Box		Tope Alake	
2019	Two Weeks in Lagos	Joshua	Kathryn Fasegha	
2020	Rise of the Saints	Wale	Samuel O. Olateru	
2020	Omo Ghetto: The Saga	Femi Stone	JJC Skillz	Produced by Funke Akindele
2021	King of Boys: The Return of the King	Adetola Fashina	Kemi Adetiba	Netflix original limited series
2021	Swallow	Sanwo	Kunle Afolayan	
2021	Castle & Castle	Kwabena Mills		
2021	Prophetess	Fogo Bombastic	Niyi Akinmolayan	
2022	Blood Sisters	Kola	Biyi Bandele	Netflix original limited series
2022	Elesin Oba: The King's Horseman	Olunde	Biyi Bandele	Netflix and Ebonylife TV co-production
2022	Obara'M	Fidelis	Kayode Kasum	
2023	Domino Effect	Kola	Freddie George	
2024	Dead Serious	Deremi	Moses Inwang	Comedy
2024	Crossroads	Oyekan	Adebayo Tijani and Tope Adebayo	
2024	Timini	Timini	Chibuike Ibe	Action
2025	Radio Voice			Produced by Richard Mofe-Damijo
2025	Queen of Mars	Luke Maddison	Takegoro Nishimura and Takeshi Kawakami	Miniseries
2025	The Herd		Daniel Etim-Effiong	

== Awards ==
Year	Event	Prize	Recipient	Result	Ref
2013	In-Short Film Festival	Best Actor in a Short Film - Supporting Role in an English language film (Married but Living Single)	Deyemi Okanlawon (Blink)	Won	
2013	In-Short Film Festival	Best Short Film	Blink	Nominated	
2013	Africa Magic Viewer's Choice Awards (AMVCA)	Best New Media Online Video	Kpians Premonition	Won	
2013	AFRINOLLY	Best Animation	In Iredu	Won	
2015	Best of Nollywood (BON) Awards	Revelation of the Year	Deyemi Okanlawon (If Tomorrow Never Comes)	Won	
2015	GMA Awards	Best Actor, African Collaboration	Deyemi Okanlawon (If Tomorrow Never Comes)	Won	
2016	GMA Awards	Best Actor, African Collaboration	Deyemi Okanlawon (No Man's Land)	Won	
2016	GMA Awards	Best Actor in a Drama Series	Deyemi Okanlawon (An African City)	Nominated	
2019	Best of Nollywood Awards	Best Supporting Actor –English	Deyemi Okanlawon (Levi)	Nominated	
2022	Africa Magic Viewers' Choice Awards	Best Actor in A Comedy	Deyemi Okanlawon (Omo Ghetto: The Saga )	Nominated	
