= Eromo Egbejule =

Nigerian writer and journalist

- Born: Eromo Egbejule
- Occupations: Writer, journalist, filmmaker
- Years active: 2012 - present
- Website: www.eromoegbejule.com

Eromo Egbejule is a Nigerian journalist, writer and filmmaker. He is known mostly for his work on the Boko Haram insurgency and reporting on politics, history, culture and other conflicts across Africa. He is currently West Africa correspondent at The Guardian, after joining from Al Jazeera English where he was Africa Editor. He has been described as "one of Nigeria’s most important storytellers".

== Background ==
Egbejule is from Delta State, Nigeria. He has degrees in engineering, media and communications and data journalism from the University of Nigeria, Nsukka, University of Leicester and Columbia University respectively.

== Writing career ==
He started his career writing for local Nigerian papers like The Guardian (Nigeria), ThisDay, NEXT and YNaija. In 2014, he covered the ebola crisis in Liberia for local Nigerian media, but later that year began working as a freelance reporter and stringer for foreign media on music and culture. Since then, he has reported extensively on the Boko Haram insurgency, elections across West Africa, sustainability in the Peruvian Amazon, Sino-African relations in the Horn of Africa and other themes. In a 2017 interview, he is quoted to have said his reporting style focuses on 'rotating the cube'.

His writing and photography have appeared in The Atlantic, The Guardian (UK), Al-Jazeera, New York Times, Financial Times, Washington Post, Frankfurter Allgemeine Zeitung, Thomson Reuters Foundation, Premium Times, Telegraph (UK), The Times and more. In 2020, he joined OZY as its Africa Editor, just months after leaving his role as West Africa Editor for The Africa Report magazine (2018-2019). In 2022, he joined Al Jazeera English as its Africa Editor, before joining the Guardian as its West and Central Africa correspondent in 2024.

In fall 2019, he was named one of four Dag Hammarsjköld Journalism Fellows at the United Nations Headquarters in New York for his work in covering 'husband schools' in rural Sierra Leone, setup to combat gender-based violence in the country. His narrative nonfiction has also been shortlisted for the 2019 and 2023Miles Morland Foundation Writing Scholarship for narrative nonfiction.

Egbejule has also been an academic, having been a visiting lecturer and researcher to Malmö University, Sweden across February 2017. He has also taught lectures and seminar classes at the University of Copenhagen, Linnaeus University, Växjö and New York University on among other things, his coverage of the insurgency in the Sahel and Anglophone crisis in Cameroon. In 2014, he was a recipient of the Prince Claus travel grant for culture and development, to facilitate a short teaching spell in Mexico.

== See also ==
- List of Nigerian writers
