= Gidi Up =

Nigerian web drama series

- Genre: Drama; Romance
- Written by: Jadesola Osiberu; Bodunrin Sasore
- Directed by: Jadesola Osiberu
- Starring: Current OC Ukeje; Somkele Iyamah; Deyemi Okanlawon; Titilope Sonuga; Bimbo Manuel; Iretiola Doyle; Anthony Monjaro; Adesua Etomi; Jide Kosoko; Ikechukwu Onunaku; Former Oreka Godis; Karibi Fubura; KC Ejelonu
- Country of origin: Nigeria
- Original languages: English; Yoruba
- No. of seasons: 2
- No. of episodes: 20 (list of episodes)

Production
- Executive producers: Lola Odedina; Pascal Or
- Producers: Jadesola Osiberu; Kemi "Lala" Akindoju
- Production locations: Lagos, Lagos State, Nigeria
- Cinematography: Muhammed Atta Ahmed
- Editors: John Harry; Muhammed Atta
- Camera setup: single-cam Kunle Idowu; Kenechukwu Obiajulu; Owolabi Fabiyi; Ugwu Michael; Kagho Idhebor; Femi Bamigbetan; Leonard Nformi (Aerial Photography)
- Running time: ~ 10 minutes (Season 1); 30 minutes (Season 2)
- Production company: Ndani Productions

Original release
- Network: Ndani TV
- Release: 20 February 2013 – 29 September 2014

Gidi Up is a Nigerian television and web drama series starring OC Ukeje, Deyemi Okanlawon, Somkele Iyamah, and Titilope Sonuga in lead roles. The series was created by Jadesola Osiberu and executively produced by Lola Odedina. It is produced by Ndani TV and sponsored by GTBank. Owing to unknown reasons, the show was not picked up for a third season. The show was cancelled after two seasons. Episodes are first aired online through Ndani.tv web channel, and the first episode was aired on 20 February 2013.

The series follows the lives of four young adults (Obi, Tokunbo, Eki and Yvonne) who are pursuing success and independence in the city of Lagos, revealing the challenges they are faced with at every step of the way in their quest to achieve their dreams. The title of the series is culled from the popular term "Las Gidi", a nickname for Lagos city.

The first season of the series was an eight-part web miniseries, with a length of approximately eight minutes per episode and used to be broadcast only online. The second season was however converted into a full 30-minute episodial television and webseries, with the first season combined, re-edited and aired on television as the pilot episode for season 2.

== Plot ==
=== Premise ===
Gidi Up follows the lives of four friends (Obi, Yvonne, Tokunbo and Eki) with different dreams and aspirations. They are faced with many challenges; they get into troubles, make bad and regretful decisions as they pursue their careers in the city of Lagos, Nigeria.

=== Overview ===
Season 1
Obi (Karibi Fubara) is a budding radio presenter. He is offered a huge TV deal and as a result, he obtains a loan from a thug to acquire a life of luxury, hoping that when he gets the pay for the television project, he'd pay back the loan time. However, his pay for the first season of the show is very low and not enough to do anything, and Obi ends up getting threats from his creditor. Yvonne (Somkele Iyamah) is an upcoming fashion designer who starts up a fashion brand with the help of an aristo; Chief Jagun (Bimbo Manuel). Tokunbo (Deyemi Okanlawon) is having problems with his father regarding his career interest, while Eki (Oreka Godis) also leaves her home because her parents do not support her dreams to pursue a career in Photography.
Season 2
Obi's creditor eventually gets his payment by hijacking Obi and taking his car and gadgets, which leads to Obi meeting Illa (Iretiola Doyle), a woman who saved him, and ended up being his sugar mummy. Yvonne drops charges against Folarin (Daniel Effiong), and she goes into business with Sharon (Adesua Etomi), Chief Jagun's daughter, to relaunch “Vone”, which had crumbled along with Yvonne's breakup with Chief Jagun. Tokunbo starts up a company, "Techserve", which is marred by Obi's constant nonchalant attitude. Tokunbo's relationship with Eki hits the rocks, and Eki finds comfort in the arms of Mo (Ikechukwu Onunaku), who becomes her best friend.

== Cast and characters ==
=== Main characters ===
- Karibi Fubara (Season 1) / OC Ukeje (Season 2) as Obi, A radio and television personality. He is a bit nonchalant, a player and a friend to Eki and Tokunbo. He gets to meet Yvonne through Eki and they both become close friends.
- Somkele Iyamah as Yvonne, A fashion designer who is a bit desperate to become very successful due to her poor family background. She is a close friend to Obi, whom she met through another Close friend of hers; Eki. She also gets to meet Tokunbo through Obi. She starts up a fashion label (Vone) through the help of an aristo which crumbles after she ends her relationship with Chief..
- Deyemi Okanlawon as Tokunbo Adepoju, an ambitious young man, who doesn't have a great relationship with his father. He starts up a company that deals with cashless transaction platform. He is a friend to Yvonne, whom he met through a close friend of his; Obi. He is dating Eki, another friend he met through Obi.
- Oreka Godis (Season 1) / Titi Sonuga (Season 2) as Eki, A professional photographer, who is also not in good terms with her parents as they do not support her career line. Eki is always a bit conscious of people and things around her. Eki is dating Tokunbo who was introduced to her by her friend, Tokunbo.

=== Recurring characters ===
- KC Ejelonu (Season 1) / Adesua Etomi (Season 2) as Sharon Olaitan Jagun, Chief Jagun's daughter. She's also a friend and a business partner to Yvonne.
- Makida Moka as Monye, Eki's younger sister, a model who has always had a crush on Obi. Obi however always looks at her like a younger sister.
- Bimbo Manuel as Chief Jagun, Sharon's father; he is a wealthy man who's a commissioner; he is also into younger women.
- Daniel Etim Effiong as Folarin, Chief Jagun's personal assistant. Part of his job is to help Jagun to scout for young females to keep as mistress. He eventually loses his job after Yvonne ends her relationship with Chief.
- Anthony Monjaro as Meka (Season 2), Sharon's fiancée who often feels that he does most things out of obligation and not out of the love for doing it. He is also having an affair with Yvonne.
- Iretiola Doyle as Illa (Season 2), a wealthy woman who saves Obi by taking him to the hospital and paying his bills after being attacked by his creditor. She eventually becomes Obi's cougar.
- Jide Kosoko as Commissioner Olaitan (season 2), Chief Jagun's friend whom Folarin later works for.
- Sharon Ooja as Jola (season 2), Monye's friend who appears to be more wild and outgoing than Monye
- Ikechukwu Onunaku as Mo (season 2), Eki's friend
- Najite Dede as Ade, Obi's employer
- Demi Olubanwo as Yemi (season 2), Tokunbo's business partner and friend
- Yvonne Ekwere as Ify (season 2), Tokunbo's long time friend and love interest
- Udoka Oyeka as the thug from whom Obi borrowed money; he constantly issues threats to Obi after he is unable to pay up the debt.
- Abiodun Kassim as Charles, Tokunbo's friend; he comes from a well-to-do family, but can't help Tokunbo when Tokunbo asks him for help in finding investors for his budding business, he [Charles] however throws a party and gets close to Tokunbo after Tokunbo eventually establishes his company.
- Seun Ajayi as Wole, Tokunbo's friend.

== Production ==
The idea for a series about four friends striving to survive was born in 2012 by Jadesola Osiberu, few months after the establishment of Ndani TV. Scripts were sought, but none of the scripts submitted captured the director's vision of what she wanted the series to look like. The mission of Ndani is majorly to tell contemporary African stories, Osiberu eventually decided to pen the script for the first season. Kemi ‘Lala’ Akindoju was sought to help with casting. The word "Gidi", from the title "Gidi Up", is culled from the popular term "Las Gidi" (often shortened as "Gidi") which can be translated as "Real Lagos", and is used in referring to the city of Lagos. The series was initially an eight-part web miniseries, with a length of approximately eight minutes per episode and used to be broadcast only online. Owing to the positive response from the audience, it was decided to make the second season bigger, thereby converting the series into 30 minutes per episode. The second season was also aired on television, with the first season combined and aired on television as a 52-minute pilot episode for the season.
