= Adeola Ariyo =

Ambassador

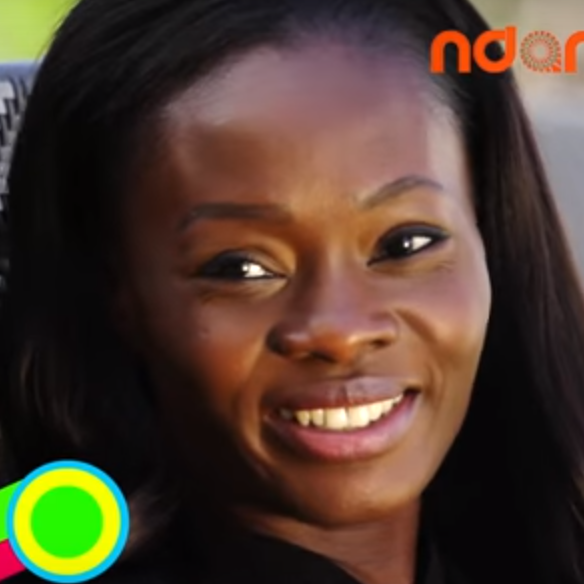
- Born: Adeola Ariyo; 1980s Lagos
- Other name: AdeolaAriyo
- Education: B.A Psychology and Criminology from University of South Africa
- Height: 1.75 m (5 ft 9 in)

Adeola Ariyo is a Nigerian born model who became Elizabeth Arden's first ever African Ambassador in 2014. She began her modelling career at the age of 13 after being scouted for and participating in the London Fashion Week. Adeola is sometimes referred to as a Nigerian-Ghanaian because of her mixed heritage. She is born to a Ghanaian Mother and Nigerian Father.

== Early life ==
Ariyo was born in Lagos to a Ghanaian Mother and a Nigerian Father. She grew up in Nigeria but sometimes traveled to London with her father. Her participation in the London Fashion Week at the age of 13 was made possible when she went shopping with her father in London. While she spend most of her time in Cape Town, South Africa, Adeola also travel to Lagos and London.

== career ==
Her modelling career began at the early age of 13 when she met Alek Wek and Kate Moss just after being signed by the London Fashion Week agency. In 2005, she participated in the Nokia Face of Africa Competition and since then, she has been very active in the international modelling scene. Aside from featuring in the London Fashion Week, Adeola has also featured in other fashion weeks. Notable among them are the Johannesburg Fashion Week, Mozambique Fashion Week, Cape Town Fashion Week, Arise Fashion Week Lagos and the London Fashion Week. She spent several years modelling in South Africa before securing the Elizabeth Arden appointment in February 2014. Aside featuring in different fashion weeks, Adeola also featured for a number of fashion publications such as Marie Claire, True Love and Fair Lady, Cosmopolitan and Glamour.

In 2021 she was the main presenter of a show called TV Knockout which began a second season.

== Other works ==
She supports "The Lunchbox Fund", a project providing daily meals for vulnerable school children and orphans in South Africa. Adeola was also involved in other Elizabeth Arden projects like the "Make a Visible Difference" campaign.
