= Udoka Oyeka =

Nigerian American actor, director and producer

- Born: Dallas
- Occupations: Actor, producer, director

Udoka Oyeka is a Nigerian-American actor, director, and producer. He directed the short film, Down and Out, which was nominated in 3 categories, including best short film at the 2013 Africa Magic Viewers' Choice Awards.

== Early life and education ==
Udoka was born in Dallas, Texas. 2 years after he was born, his family moved from the United States back to Nigeria, where his parents were originally from. His father, Solomon Oyeka, was a chemical engineer while his mother, Florence Oyeka, was a civil servant. After completing high school in Lagos, Nigeria, Udoka returned to Texas where he attended the University of Texas, Arlington. Since his original passion was music, he decided to take a theatre elective which sparked his passion for acting and directing.

After graduating from the University of Texas with a degree in Accounting, he enrolled at the Theresa Bell Actors Studio where he studied acting for the screen. He supported himself through drama school by performing in community theatre.

== Career ==
Udoka started his acting career by performing in school plays while in university. He also performed in Community theatre for two years to put himself through drama school Upon his return to Nigeria, he released his first feature film, ZR-7: The Red House Seven in August 2011. Following that, he released his first short film, Down and Out which was nominated for the Best Short Film Award at the 2013 African Magic Viewer's Choice Awards.

In 2013, he directed a Cancer Awareness film titled "Living Funeral" which was produced by the Pink Pearl Foundation. The movie was nominated for 8 awards at the African Magic Viewers' Choice Awards.

In 2018, he was nominated for the Most Promising Actor of the Year (English) Category at the City People Movie Awards.

== Filmography ==
=== Directing credits ===
- ZR-7 :The Red House Seven (2011)
- Down and Out (2012)
- Living Funeral (2013)
- No Good Turn (2015)
- Lasgidi Vice (2017)
- Three Thieves (2019)
- Listen (2020)
- The Razz Guy (2021)
- Price of Admission (2021)

=== Acting credits ===
- Tinsel (TV series) (2014, 1 episode) as Tsav
- Gidi Up (2014 TV Series) as Creditor
- When Love Happens (2016) as Tobe
- No Good Turn (2015) as Dr. Gbenga Jakande
- The Department (2015) as James Okolo
- The First Lady (2015) as Michael
- Lunch Time Heroes (2015)
- Sylvia (2018) as Obaro
- Coming from Insanity (2019) as Detective Toye

== Awards ==
Year	Award	Category	Work	Result	Ref
2013	Africa Magic Viewers' Choice Awards	Best Short Film	Down and Out	Nominated	
2014	Africa Magic Viewers' Choice Awards	Best Movie (Drama)	Living Funeral	Nominated	

== See also ==
- List of Nigerian actors
- List of Nigerian film directors
