= Somkele Idhalama =

Nigerian actress

Somkele Iyamah-Idhalama
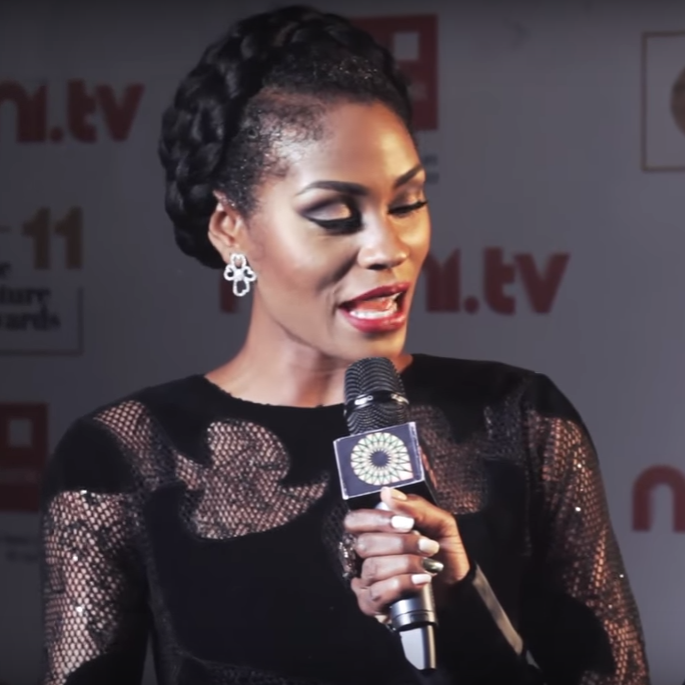
- Somkele Iyamah in 2016
- Born: Somkele Iyamah; 23 March 1988 (age 38); Delta State, Nigeria
- Education: McMaster University
- Occupations: Actress; Model
- Years active: 2011 - present
- Known for: 93 Days; The Wedding Party; The Arbitration
- Website: www.somkele.com

Somkele Iyamah-Idhalama (born 23 March 1988) is a Nigerian TV and film actress and model. She is well known for her roles in 93 Days (2016), The Wedding Party, The Arbitration (2016) and the TV series Gidi Up (2013–2014) and at the Toronto International Film Festival and Africa International Film Festival. She is an ambassador for Multichoice's DSTV Explora, the widest satellite cable network across Africa. She has in the movie, A Soldier's Story 2: Return from the Dead - sequel to a 2016 multiple award-winning romantdramasama. She is cast in the role of the Progenitor in the final episodes of Star Trek Discovery (2024).

Iyamah was born in Ika South Area of Delta State to Andrew and Onyi Iyamah, both are of Ika (Agbor) origin. She is the third of four children. She was introduced to dance and drama by an inspirational teacher, Mrs. Abe while attending Grange School in Lagos.

Somkele holds a bachelor's degree in biochemistry from McMaster University. Somkele volunteered in several shows for charity at McMaster and modeled during the holidays in Nigeria. Her website states her work includes Virgin Nigeria, Harp, ETB and Visafone Communications.

== Career ==
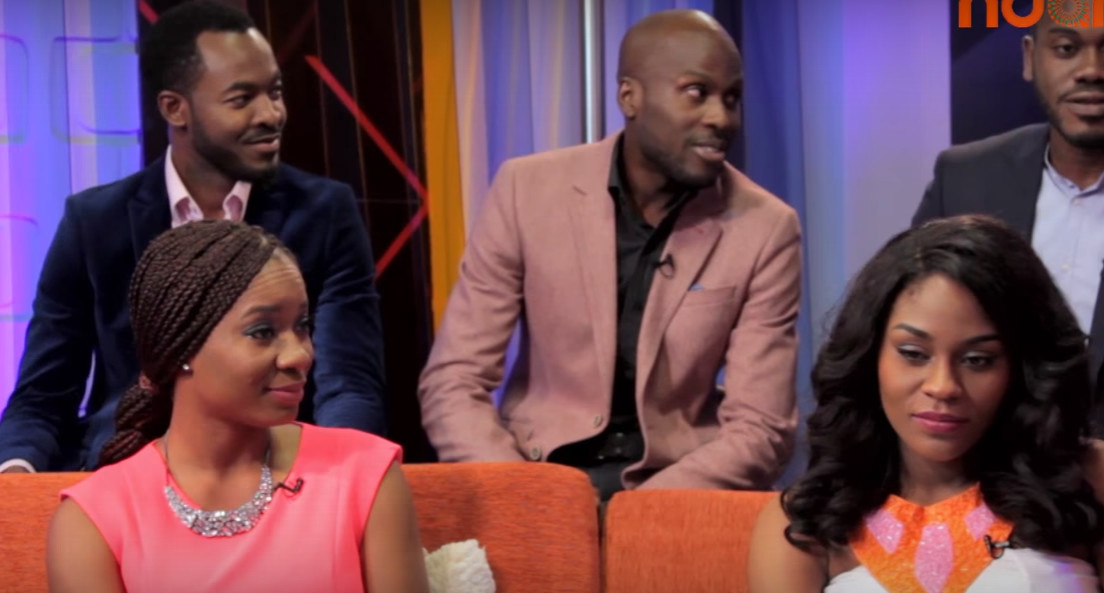
The Gidi Up main cast including Ikechukwu Onunaku

Her first audition landed her a lead role. Her works for TV are in the AMVCA nominated and critically acclaimed series, ‘GIDI UP’ by NdaniTV, Amazon's ‘THE EXPAN,SE’ and CBC's ‘CORONER’. Her career in film has led her to share the screen with Nollywood's directors such as Steve Gukas and Kemi Adetiba. She also shared screen-time with Hollywood veteran, Danny Glover in the biopic, 93 DAYS where she plays one of the surviving doctors who caught Ebola in Nigeria directed by Steve Gukas which went on to win several awards and accolades. That role won her an ELOY award (best actress of the year), AMVCA nomination best-supportingting actress, an AMVCA trailblazer award win, TFAA award, an AMAA nominat,ion and an AFRIFF Jury Award. She starred alongside Hollywood veteran, Eric Roberts in the movie: A Soldier's Story 2: Return From The Dead which was released in Dec 2020.

Her corporate endorsements include Multichoice Nigeria (DSTV Ambassador), Jewel By Lisa, and The Access Bank Lagos City Marathon. She has been on the cover of GENEVIEVE Magazine and interviewed by her Alma Mater, McMaster University for their Canada @ 150 special Edition as well as CNN online. She serves as the Regional Head of the fashion brand, Andrea Iyamah.

== Personal life ==
Somkele manages the fashion brand, Andrea Iyamah, founded by her younger sister, Dumebi Iyamah. She is married to Captain Aaron Idhalama, a thought leader and industry professional in the Nigerian aviation sector. She has a son that had cancer and later became cancer free.

== Awards and nominations ==
Year	Award	Category	Work	Result
2016	Toronto International Film Festival (TIFF)	International Rising Star	Herself	Won
2016	Africa International Film Festival (AFRIFF)	Special Jury Recognition Award	93 Days	Won
2016	The Exquisite Lady Of The Year (ELOY) Awards	Actress Of The Year	93 Days	Won
2016	The Future Awards Africa	Prize For Actor	93 Days	Won
2016	Africa Movie Academy Award (AMAA)	Best Supporting Actress	93 Days	Nominated
2017	2017 Africa Magic Viewers Choice Awards	Best Supporting Actress	93 Days	Nominated
2017	2017 Africa Magic Viewers Choice Awards	Trailblazer Award	Herself	Won

== Filmography ==
=== Film ===
Year	Title	Role	Notes
2013	Dreamwalker	Isabella	Fantasy / Romance
2015	The Department	Ireti	With Jide Kosoko, Osas Ighodaro Ajibade, O.C. ukeje, Director: Remi Vaughn Richards
2016	The Arbitration	Omawumi Horsefall	With O.C. Ukeje, Iretiola Doyle, Adesua Etomi Director: Niyi Akinmolayan
2016	Ojukokoro	Sade	
2016	The Wedding Party	Yemisi Disu	With Adesua Etomi, Richard Mofe Damijo, Iretiola Doyle, Banky W Director: Kemi Adetiba
2016	93 Days	Dr. Ada Igonoh	With Danny Glover, Gideon Okeke, Bimbo Akintola, Director: Steve Gukas
2017	The Wedding Party 2	Yemisi Disu	With Adesua Etomi, Richard Mofe Damijo, Iretiola Doyle, Banky W Director: Niyi Akinmolayan
2017	The Guest		
2018	Lara and the Beat	Dara Giwa	With Seyi Shay, Vector The Viper, Chioma Akpotha Director: Tosin Coker
2019	She Is		
2020	A Soldier's Story: Return from the Dead	Zaya	With Eric Roberts, Linda Ejiofor, Daniel K. Daniel Director: Frankie Ogar
2023	Orah	Lace	Crime / Drama / Thriller

=== Television ===
Year	Title	Role	Notes
2024	Star Trek: Discovery	Progenitor	Star Trek: Discovery; season 5 episode 10: Life, Itself
2020	The Expanse	Engineer	Network: Amazon Prime
2018	Coroner	Mrs. Kamau	Network: CBC
2015	Best Friends	Uche	Network: EbonyLife TV
2014	Gidi Up Season 2	Yvonne	Network: Ndani TV
2013	Gidi Up Season 1	Yvonne	Network: Ndani TV
2013	Gidi Up (Pilot)	Yvonne	Network: Ndani TV

== See also ==
- List of Nigerian actors
