= Ndani TV =

Nigerian web-based channel

- Country: Nigeria
- Broadcast area: Worldwide
- Headquarters: Lagos, Lagos State, Nigeria

Programming
- Language: English

Ownership
- Owner: Guaranty Trust Bank

History
- Launched: 2012
- Founder: GT Bank

Links
- Website: https://ndani.tv

Availability

Streaming media
- YouTube: Ndani TV

Ndani TV is a web-based channel owned by GTBank.

== History ==
The old NdaniTV logo (—2012—2023)

Ndani TV was established in 2012 by GTBank to offer both entertainment and informative content in order to attract a youthful customer base. It was the first online video content vehicle launched by a Nigerian bank and has grown into a media company. Since its launch, Ndani TV gained traction with productions such as Frank Donga's The Interview, Skinny Girl in Transit and the Ndani TGIF show.

NdaniTV's YouTube channel has over 107 million views and over 519,000 subscribers as of January 2023.

Ndani TV offers its audience an insider's look at the African continent, Hence the name 'Ndani' which is a Swahili word for 'Inside.'

== Productions ==
=== TV shows ===
- 37 Questions
- Afrocity
- Fashion Insider
- Game On
- Gidi Up
- Lagos Big Boy
- Ndani Real Talk
- Ndani Sessions
- Ndani TGIF Show
- Phases
- Ratings
- Rumor Has It
- Skinny Girl in Transit
- The Interview
- The Juice
- The Mix

=== Ndani Shorts ===
- Frost Bite
- FRACTURED
- The Housewife

=== Oga Pastor Controversy ===
After 3 episodes aired, it was noted that NdaniTV took down Oga Pastor, a series about the life of a pastor balancing personal issues, scandals and church responsibilities. This occurred in the midst of sexual assault allegations against Pastor Biodun Fatoyinbo and led to speculation of the take down being related to the situation. Ndani TV did not issue an official statement.

== Recognition ==
YouTube Creator Award for Entertainment in 2016.

== Gallery ==
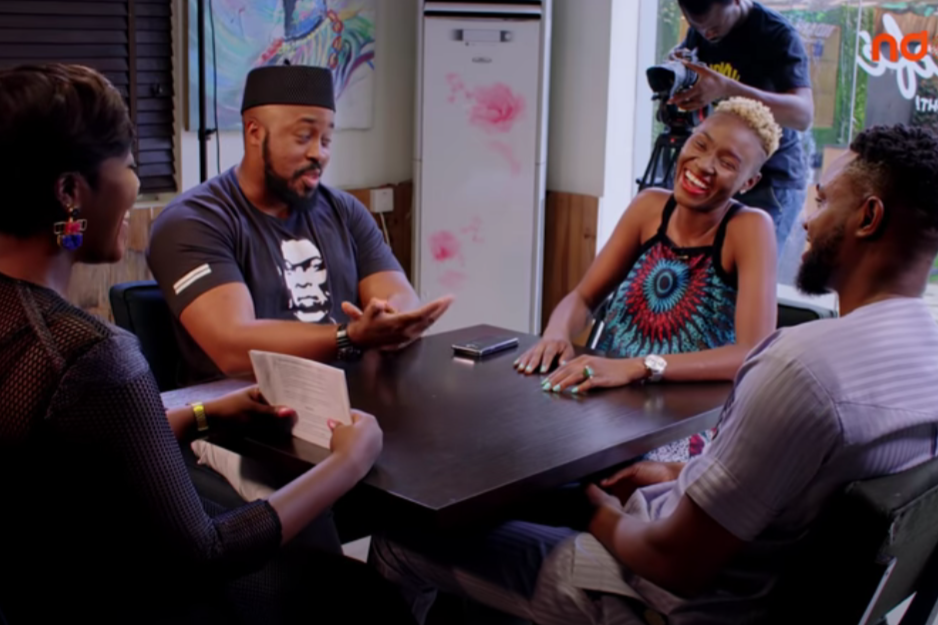
Ndani Real Talk

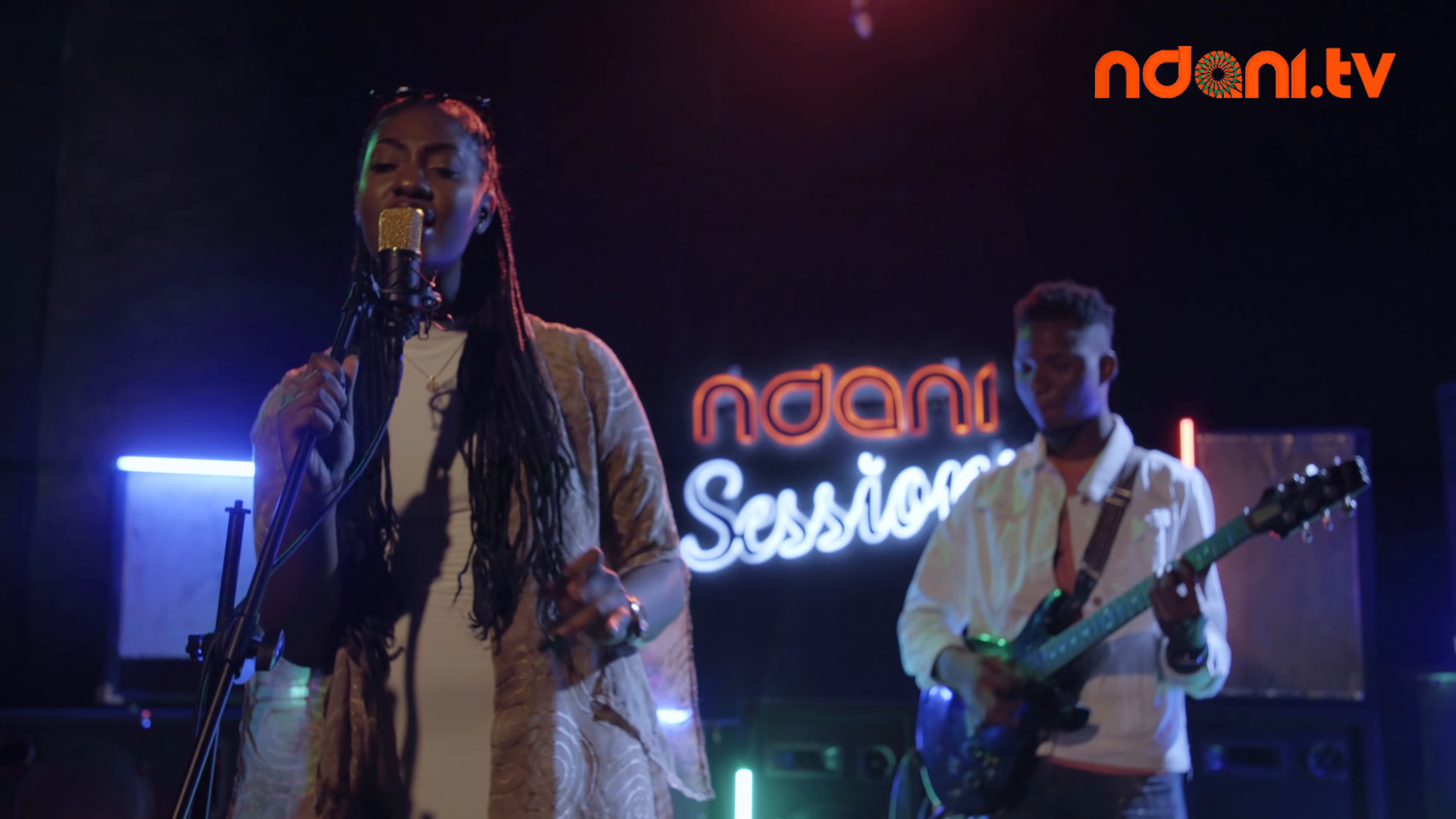
Tems on NdaniTV Sessions

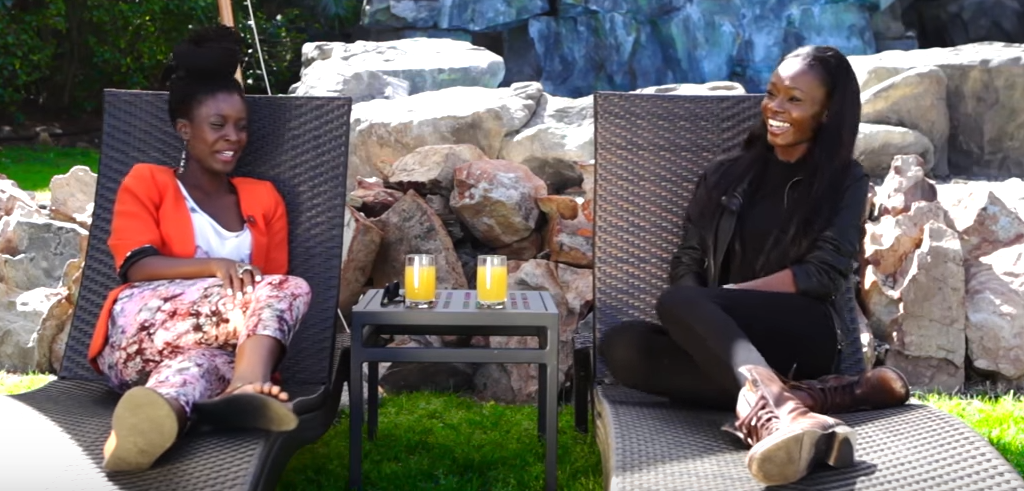
Adeola Ariyo and Folu Storms on NdaniTV in S/Africa

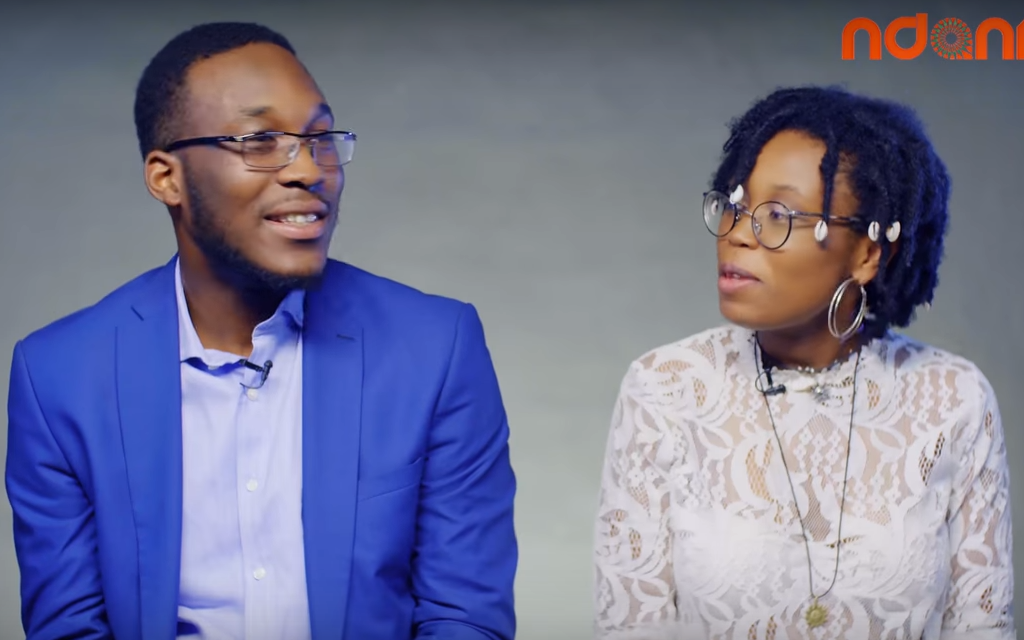
Tosan Wiltshere & Lady Donli Ndani TGIF show

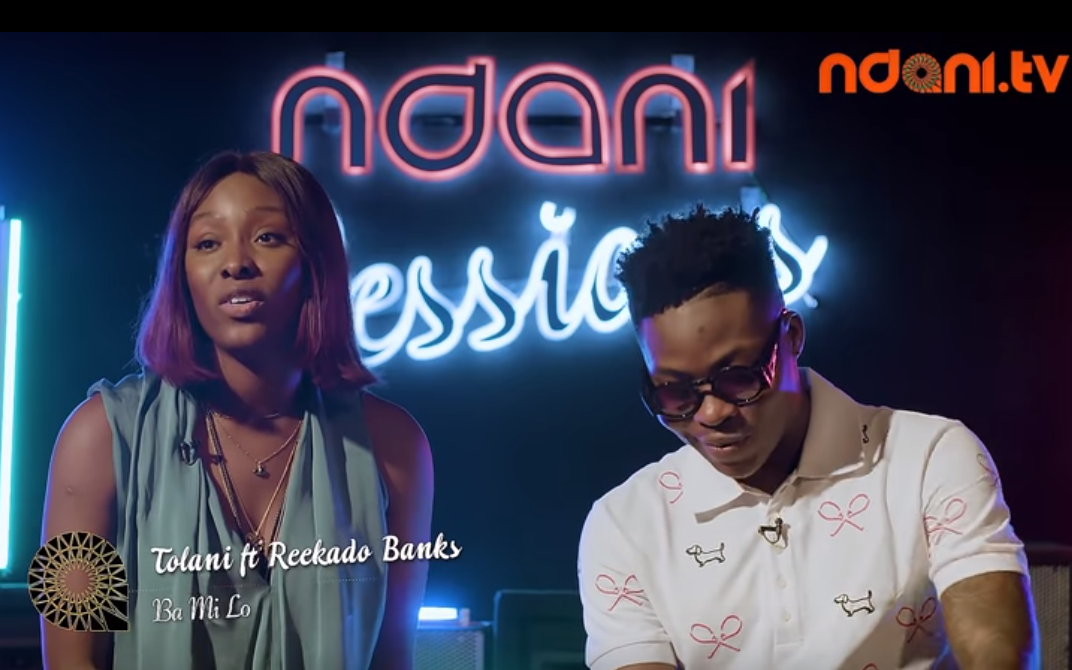
Tolani and Reekado Banks on Ndani Sessions

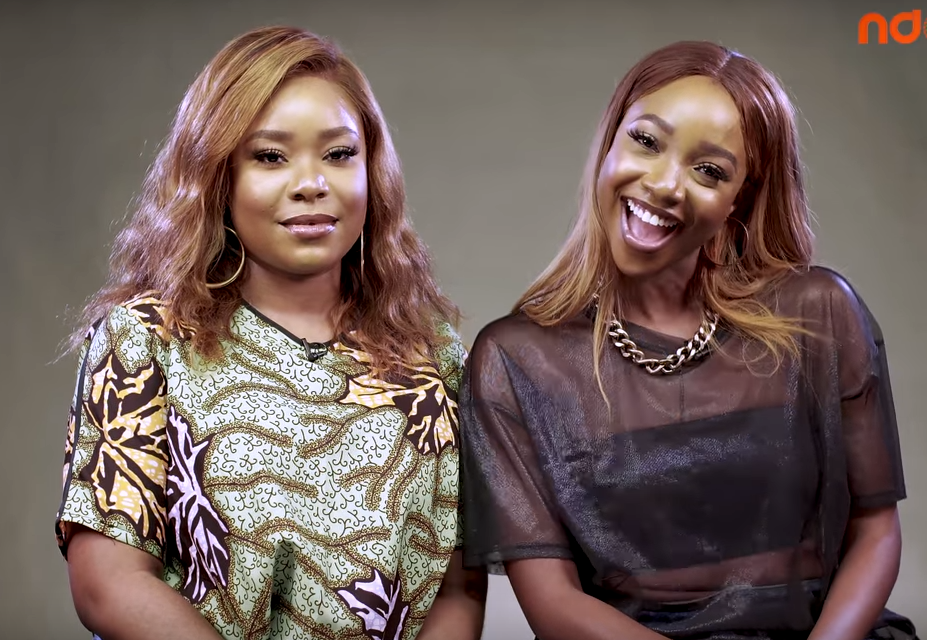
Mimi Onalaja and Ini Dima-Okojie on Ndani TGIF show

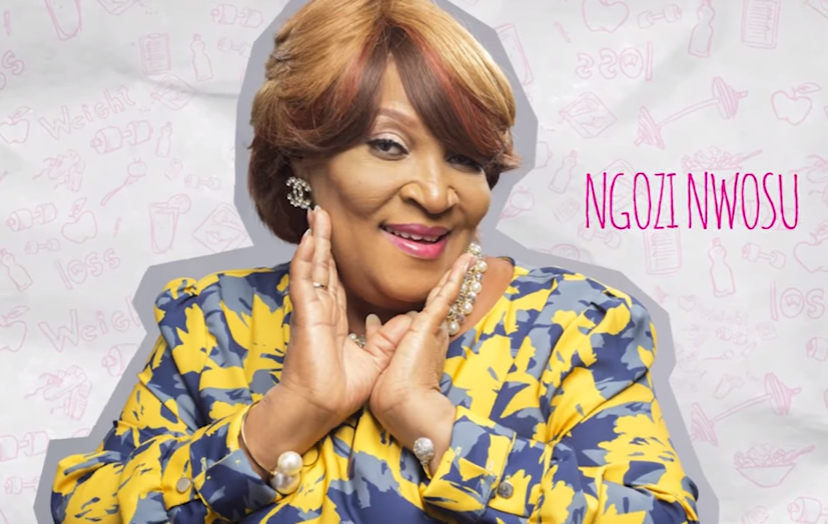
Ngozi Nwosu on Skinny girl in transit

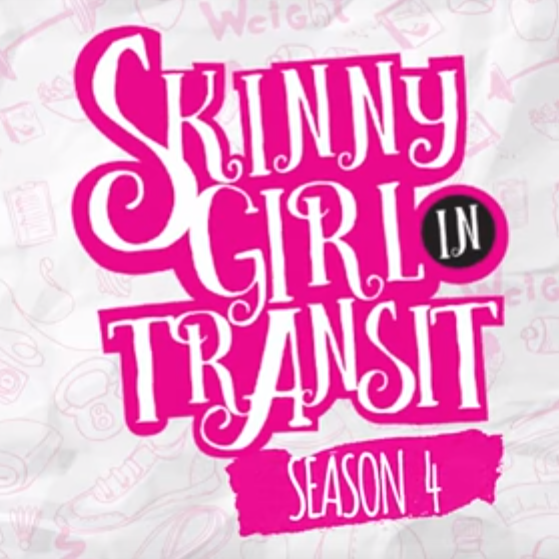
Skinny girl in transit season 4 poster

== See also ==
- Skinny Girl in Transit
- Gidi Up
- Jadesola Osiberu
