= Linda Ejiofor =

Nigerian actress and model (born 1986)

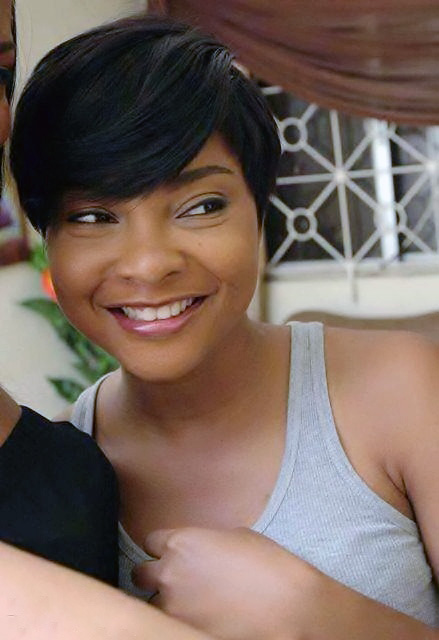
- Ejiofor on set of The Meeting in 2011
- Born: Linda Ihuoma Ejiofor; 17 July 1986 (age 40); Lagos, Lagos State, Nigeria
- Other name: Linda Ejiofor-Suleiman
- Education: University of Port Harcourt
- Occupation: Actress
- Years active: 2007–present
- Notable work: The Meeting
- Spouse: Ibrahim Suleiman (m. 2018)
- Awards: 2015 Africa Magic Viewers Choice Awards

Linda Ejiofor (born Linda Ihuoma Ejiofor; 17 July 1986) is a Nigerian actress and model from Abia state, located in the southeastern region of Nigeria. She is known for her role as Bimpe Adekoya in M-Net's TV series Tinsel. She made history at the 12th edition of the Africa Magic Viewers’ Choice Awards by becoming the first actress ever to win both the Best Actress in a Lead Role and Best Supporting Actress awards during the same ceremony. She received the Best Actress in a Lead Role award for her performance in The Serpent’s Gift and won Best Supporting Actress for her role in The Herd.

She was nominated for Best Actress in a Supporting Role at the 9th Africa Movie Academy Awards for her role in the film The Meeting (2012). Tony Ogaga Erhariefe of The Sun Nigeria listed her as one of the ten fastest-rising Nollywood stars of 2013.

== Early life ==
A native of Isuikwuato, Ejiofor was born in Lagos, southwest Nigeria. She is the second of five children. Ejiofor attended Ilabor Primary School in Surulere and later enrolled at the Federal Government Girls' College in Onitsha, Anambra State, Nigeria. She also studied sociology at the University of Port Harcourt, Rivers State, south-south Nigeria.

== Career ==
Ejiofor initially wanted to work for an advertising agency. In an interview posted in The Nation newspaper, she said she changed her mind about pursuing a career in advertising after developing interest in acting. She also said she hoped to direct films in the future. In 2018, she starred alongside Jemima Osunde in Ndani TV's web series Rumour Has It.

== Personal life ==
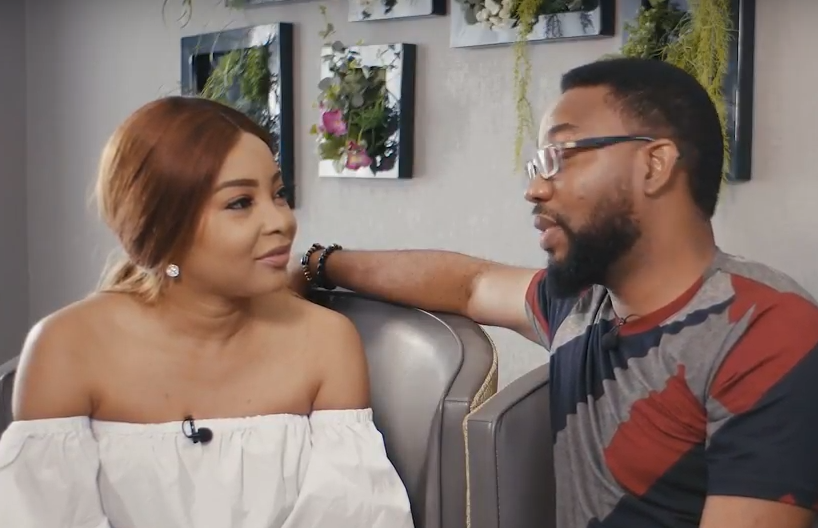
Ejiofor with her husband in 2018

On 4 November 2018, she announced her engagement to Tinsel actor Ibrahim Suleiman and married him four days later. The couple welcomed their first child Keon Iman Suleiman on 9 July 2020.

== Filmography ==
=== Films ===
Year	Title	Role	Notes
2012	The Meeting	Ejura	With Rita Dominic & Nse Ikpe Etim. Nominated for Best Actress in a supporting role at the 9th Africa Movie Academy Awards
2013	Secret Room	Ada Obika	With OC Ukeje
2015	Out of Luck	Halima	With Tope Tedela, Jide Kosoko, Wole Ojo, Sambasa Nzeribe
2015	Heaven's Hell		With Nse Ikpe Etim, Bimbo Akintola, OC Ukeje, Damilola Adegbite
2016	Suru L'ere		With Beverly Naya, Kemi Lala Akindoju, Tope Tedela, Enyinna Nwigwe, Gregory Ojefua and Bikiya Graham- Douglas.
2015	A Soldier's Story	Regina	With Tope Tedela, Chico Aligwekwe, Adesua Etomi, Zainab Balogun
2016	Ojukokoro (Greed)	Bukky	With Tope Tedela, Charles Etubiebi, Seun Ajayi, Shawn Faqua, Wale Ojo, Ali Nuhu
2018	Chief Daddy	Justina	With Ini Edo, Rachel Oniga, Mawuli Gavor, Falz, Kate Henshaw, Rahama Sadau, Beverly Naya, Patience Ozokwor, Shafy Bello, Funke Akindele
2019	Kpali	Awuli Kalayor	With Ini Dima-Okojie, Kunle Remi, Uzor Arukwe, Nkem Owor, IK Osakioduwa
2019	4th Republic	Bukky Ajala	With Kate Henshaw, Enyinna Nwigwe, Sani Mu'azu, Bimbo Manuel, Yakubu Muhammed, Rekiya Attah, Emil .B. Garubu, Jide Attah, Alfred Atungu
2019	She is	Erimma	
2018	Knockout Blessing	Oby	Ade Laoye, Bucci Franklin, Ademola Adedoyin
2021	Chief Daddy 2: Going for Broke	Sisi Ice Cream	
2022	Palava	Ini	With Mercy Aigbe, Bisola Aiyeola, Neo Akpofure
2024	Shina	Dr. Asinobi	With Timini Egbuson, Tope Tedela
2025	The Herd	Adama	With Daniel Etim-Effiong, Genoveva Umeh
2025	The Serpent’s Gift	Ijeoma Sylvanus	With Tina Mba, Stan Nze

=== Television ===
Year	Title	Role	Notes
2007–present	Tinsel	Bimpe	
2014	Dowry	Nike	With OC Ukeje
2018	Rumour Has It	Dolapo	For NdaniTV
2019	Flat 3B	Nneka	With Mawuli Gavor
2021	Let's talk about sex	Herself	Belgian documentairy
2023-2024	Agu	Ugochi	For Showmax

== Awards ==
Year	Award	Category	Film	Result	Ref
2013	Africa Movie Academy Awards	Best Actress in a Supporting role	The Meeting	Nominated	
2013	Nollywood Movies Awards	Best Rising Star (female)	The Meeting	Nominated	
2014	ELOY Awards	TV Actress of the Year	Dowry	Nominated	
2015	Africa Magic Viewers Choice Awards	Best supporting Actress	The Meeting	Won	
2016	Zulu African Film Academy Awards	Best Actress		Nominated	
2026	Africa Magic Viewers Choice Awards	Best supporting Actress	The Herd	Won	
2026	Africa Magic Viewers Choice Awards	Best Lead Actress	The Serpent’s Gift	Won	

== See also ==
- List of Nigerian actors
