= Tobi Bakre =

Nigerian actor (born 1994)

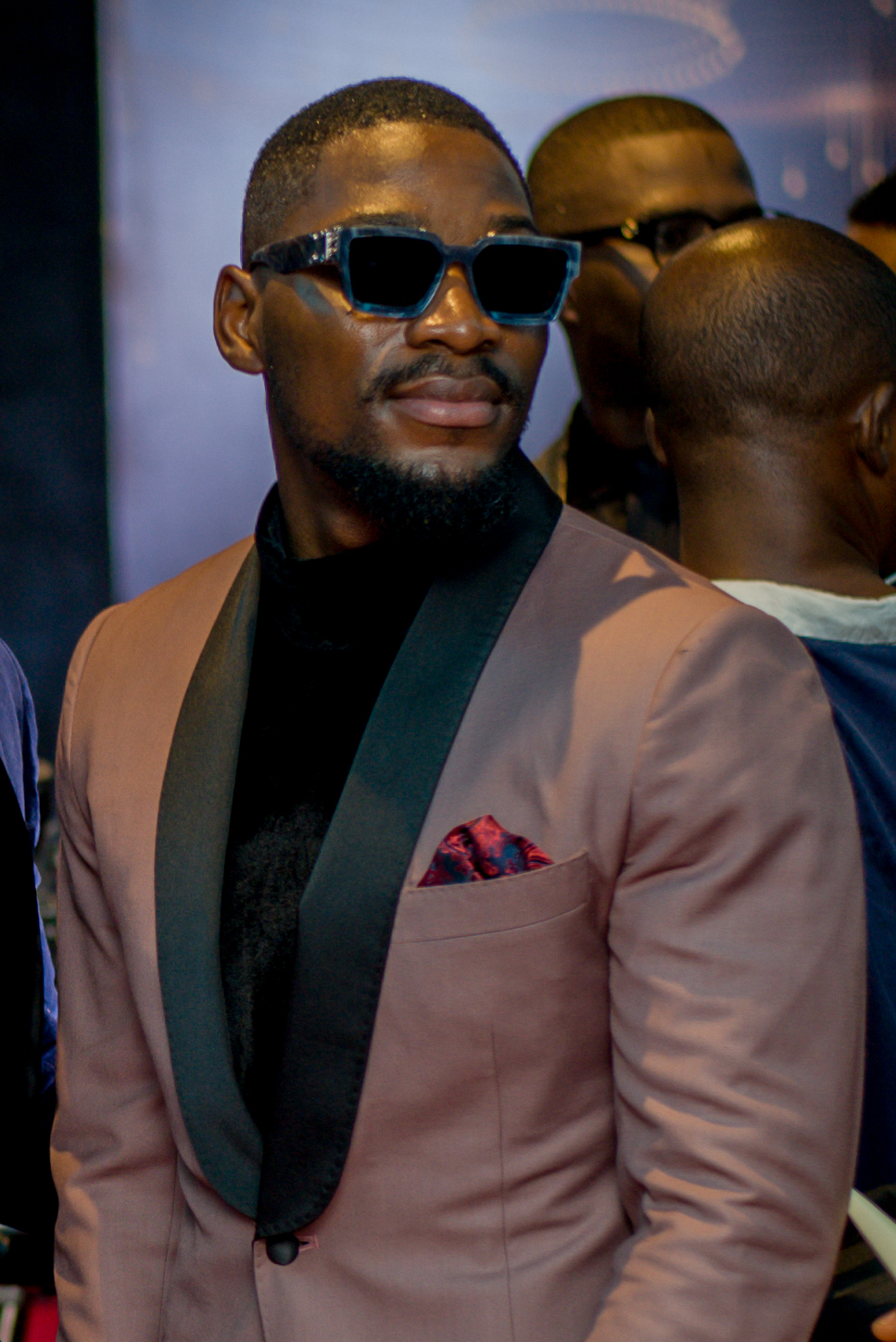
- Tobi Bakre at the AMVCAs 2020
- Born: 1 June 1994 (age 32); Lagos State, Nigeria.
- Education: Bachelor of Science in Banking & Finance, University of Lagos.
- Occupations: Actor; Model; Host; Compere; Photographer
- Years active: 2018–present
- Spouse: Anu Oladosu

Tobi Bakre (born 1 June 1994) is a Nigerian actor, model, host, compere, and photographer. (Not to be confused with British actor Tobi Bakare). Tobi rose to fame after finishing up as a finalist in the Big Brother Naija (season 3) reality TV show in 2018.

== Early life and education ==
Tobi hails from Ogun State, Nigeria and was born into a family of four children. He is the second son of Chief Olufemi Bakre, the Otunba Bobaselu of Awa-Ijebu Kingdom, Ago-Iwoye, Ogun State, who is also the Managing Director / CEO of Parallex Bank.

His older brother is Femi Bakre, CEO of Kraks TV and he has two sisters. He earned his Bachelor's degree at the University of Lagos where he graduated with a Second Class Honours Upper Division in Banking and Finance, following his father's footsteps who went to the same university and studied the same course.

== Career ==
Tobi used to be an investment banker having worked in the office of the Accountant General of the Federation and in the banking industry for four years. In 2018, he participated in the Big Brother Naija (season 3) reality TV show. He's brand ambassador to Unilever, Amstel Malta, and Jumia in and out of Nigeria.

In 2025, Bakre was named Nollywood’s highest-grossing actor for the year, earning over ₦1.4 billion in total box office revenue from multiple film appearances, ranking ahead of other leading actors in Nigeria’s cinema market.

== Personal life ==
Tobi Bakre is married to Anu Oladosu, they welcomed their second child on the 19th of September 2023. Tobi and Anu have 2 children, a boy and a girl.

== Filmography ==
=== Film ===
| Year | Title | Role | Notes |
|---|---|---|---|
| 2018 | Mokalik | Goke | with Simi directed by Kunle Afolayan |
| 2019 | Fix Us | Jojo | with Yvonne Nelson, Yvonne Okoro |
| 2019 | Sugar Rush | Andy | with Adesua Etomi, Bimbo Ademoye, and Bisola Aiyeola |
| 2020 | RattleSnake: The Ahanna Story | Ike | with Stan Nze, Osas Ighodaro, Bucci Franklin |
| 2020 | Sanitation Day | Dead Guy | with Blossom Chukwujekwu, Elozonam, Nse Ikpe-Etim |
| 2021 | The Blood Covenant | Eddy | with Uzor Arukwe, directed by Fiyin Gambo |
| 2021 | Unintentional | Ladi | with Kate Henshaw-Nuttal, Efa Iwara, Omowunmi Dada |
| 2022 | Brotherhood | Akin Adetula | with OC Ukeje and Falz, a Jade Osiberu movie. |
| 2023 | Gangs of Lagos | Obalola | with Adesua Etomi, Bimbo Ademoye, Chike, a Jade Osiberu movie |
| 2023 | The Bloom Boys | Inspector Daniel | with Bolanle Ninalowo, Timini Egbuson |
| 2023 | Sabinus the Bestman | Paul | with Sophia Chisom, Stephanie Aleye Chiori |
| 2024 | Farmer’s Bride | Femi | with Femi Branch, Gbubemi Ejeye |
| 2024 | Leaving Ikorodu in 1999 | Mahmoud | Short film with Sheila Atim |
| 2025 | Suky | Adigun | with Bimbo Ademoye, Ibrahim Yekini |
| 2025 | Red Circle | | |
| 2025 | Behind the Scenes | Adewale Fernandez | |

=== Television ===
| Year | Title | Role | Notes |
|---|---|---|---|
| 2018 | Hustle | | on Africa Magic |
| 2018 | Big Brother Naija | Self-participant | Finalist |
| 2019 | Jenifa's Diary | George | with Funke Akindele |
| 2019 | Phases | Jeje | On NdaniTV |
| 2020 | Lara of Lagos | Femi | On YouTube |
| 2023 | Slum King | Edafe "Majemiesu" Umukoro | On Africa Magic |
| 2024 | Postcards | Yemi | TV Series |

== Awards and nominations ==
| Year | Award | Category | Result | Ref |
|---|---|---|---|---|
| 2020 | 2020 Best of Nollywood Awards | Best Supporting Actor –English | Nominated | |
| 2020 | 2020 Best of Nollywood Awards | Most Promising Actor | Nominated | |
| 2021 | Net Honours | Most Popular Media Personality (Male) | Nominated | |
| 2023 | Africa Magic Viewers' Choice Awards | Best Actor in a Drama, Movie Or TV Series | Won | |
| 2023 | The Future Awards Africa | Prize for Acting | Nominated | |
| 2023 | Africa Movie Academy Awards | Best Actor in a Leading Role | Won | |

== See also ==
- List of Nigerian actors
