= White Lies (miniseries) =

British-South African Television series

- Genre: Crime thriller
- Created by: Sean Steinberg
- Written by: Darrel Bristow-Bovey
- Directed by: John Trengove; Catharine Cooke; Christiaan Olwagen
- Starring: Natalie Dormer; Brendon Daniels
- Country of origin: South Africa
- Original language: English
- No. of episodes: 8

Production
- Executive producers: Natalie Dormer; Julie Hodge; Wikus du Toit; Darrel Bristow-Bovey; Nomsa Philiso; Bob Conte; Waldimar Pelser; Georginah Machiridza; Allan Sperling; Nicola van Niekerk; Nimrod Geva; Harriet Gavshon
- Producers: Harriet Gavshon; Nimrod Geva
- Production companies: M-Net; Quizzical Pictures; Fremantle

Original release
- Network: M-Net; DStv channel 101
- Release: March 7 – April 24, 2024

White Lies is a 2024 South African crime thriller miniseries created by Sean Steinberg and written by Darrel Bristow-Bovey. Produced by Quizzical Pictures and Fremantle for M-Net, it stars Natalie Dormer and Brendon Daniels.

== Synopsis ==
In Bishopscourt, Cape Town, South Africa, investigative journalist Edie Hansen finds herself at loggerheads with veteran detective Forty Bell, after her estranged brother is murdered in his luxury home, with his teenage children the prime suspects for the crime.

== Cast ==
=== Main ===
- Natalie Dormer as Edie Hansen
- Brendon Daniels as Forty Bell

=== Supporting ===
- Langley Kirkwood as Andrew McKenzie
- Daniel Janks as Avi Kapilevich
- Morgan Santo as Jaime McKenzie
- Daniel Schultz as Daniel McKenzie
- Caely-Jo Levy as Olivia Mckenzie
- Daniah De Villiers as Chloe
- Robert Hobbs as Mackey
- Athenkosi Mfamela as Peri Zondo
- Katlego Lebogang as Nonzi Weber
- Jane de Wet as Teen Edie

== Episodes ==
No.	Title	Directed by	Written by	Original release date
1	"Tabula Rasa"	John Trengove	Darrel Bristow-Bovey	March 7, 2024
2	"Hide In Plain Sight"	John Trengove	Darrel Bristow-Bovey	March 14, 2024
3	"I Believe The Children Are Our Future"	John Trengove	Darrel Bristow-Bovey	March 21, 2024
4	"The Sense Of An Ending"	Christiaan Olwagen	Darrel Bristow-Bovey	March 28, 2024
5	"You Gotta Know When To Hold 'Em"	Catharine Cooke	Darrel Bristow-Bovey	April 4, 2024
6	"Calm Before The Storm"	Catharine Cooke	Darrel Bristow-Bovey	April 11, 2024
7	"Teach Them Well And Let Them Lead The Way"	Christiaan Olwagen	Darrel Bristow-Bovey	April 17, 2024
8	"Forget It, Jake. It's Bishopscourt"	John Trengove	Darrel Bristow-Bovey	April 24, 2024

== Production ==
In March 2023, it was announced that Brendon Daniels and Natalie Dormer would star in White Lies. The series is produced by Harriet Gavshon and Nimrod Geva for Quizzical Pictures, with Natalie Dormer and Bristow-Bovey executive producers. Julie Hodge is executive producing on behalf of Fremantle, which is also distributing the series internationally. The lead director is John Trengove, alongside Catharine Cooke and Christiaan Olwagen.

Principal photography began in South Africa on 6 March 2023. Filming lasted for three months, with locations including Cape Town.

== Genre and themes ==
Dormer describes it as "a wonderful, fun, whodunit" with "universal themes" such as "the identity of politics, and inequality". She said “For Brits, Americans, Australians watching the show, there are huge universal themes of identity, the chasm between the haves and the have nots, and social commentary, corruption commentary,.. We know all that from our own countries, but seen through South African eyes it’s different.”

== Broadcast ==
A first trailer for the series was released in February 2024.

White Lies had its world premiere in Israel, streaming on VOD from 26 February 2024. It premiered in South Africa on M-Net, DStv channel 101 on 7 March 2024. Episodes were aired weekly.

In Australia, it was shown on the streaming service Stan in April 2024.

== Reception ==
The Sydney Morning Herald called the series a "sharp crime thriller".
