= Baby farm =

Baby farm may refer to:

- Baby farming, charging to take custody of an infant
- Baby Farm (TV series), a Nigerian television series
- Child harvesting, sale of human children
