= Surulere (disambiguation) =

Surulere is a residential and commercial Local Government Area located on the Lagos mainland in Lagos State, Nigeria.

Surulere may also refer to:

- Surulere, Oyo State, a Local Government Area in Oyo State, Nigeria
- Surulere (song), a song by Dr Sid
- Suru L'ere, a 2016 film, directed by Mildred Okwo
