= Gbubemi Ejeye =

Nigerian actress (born 1995)

- Born: Oritsegbubemi Ejeye; 29 June 1994 (age 32); Lagos, Lagos State, Nigeria
- Education: Houdegbe North American University
- Occupations: Actress, model
- Years active: 2019–present

Oritsegbubemi Temitope Ejeye (born 29 June 1994) professionally known as Gbubemi Ejeye is a Nigerian actress and model. She had her debut in the movie industry with Rickety in 2019. She is known for her roles in Citation, Farmer’s Bride, All’s Fair In Love and Far From Home.

== Biography ==
Ejeye was born on 29 June 1994, in Lagos, Nigeria, to Mr. and Mrs. Ejeye. Though born in Lagos, she is originally from Delta State and belongs to the Itsekiri ethnic group from the South-South region of Nigeria.

Ejeye attended Home Science Association Nursery and Primary School, Ikoyi; and later moved to Charret Primary School, Isolo. She attended Oluade High School, where she finished her secondary education. Later, she enrolled at Houdegbe North American University in the Republic of Benin, where she earned a law degree in 2015.

== Career ==
After completing her undergraduate studies, Ejeye returned to Nigeria and participated in the mandatory National Youth Service Corps (NYSC) program. Following her service, she began working in the media industry, which eventually led her to pursue a career in acting.

Her acting career started in November 2018 with a stage performance in Color Me Pink at Terra Kulture, a play centered on breast cancer awareness. This stage debut provided her with the opportunity to transition into the Nigerian film industry, Nollywood. Shortly, she began auditioning for film roles.

Ejeye has since appeared in a variety of films. In 2022, she played the role of Eniola in the second season of the Ndani TV web series Game On. Later that year, she joined the cast of AM Covenant, portraying the character Talia. Ejeye also gained recognition for her role as Adufe in the Netflix Original series Far From Home.

In 2023, she was announced as part of the cast for MTV Shuga Naija Season 5. In 2024, she starred in Farmer’s Bride as one of the main casts alongside Tobi Bakre, Femi Branch, Mercy Aigbe and others.

== Selected filmography ==
Year	Title	Role	Ref
2024	Farmer's Bride	Funmi	
2024	Queen Lateefah	Rhodes	
2024	Criminal	Dr. Gbemi	
2024	All Fair's In Love	Dupe	
2023	The House of Secrets	Young Mrs. Lawal	
2023	Shuga	Mohini	
2022	Far From Home	Adufe	
2022	Covenant	Talla	
2022	The Catalyst	Ann	
2022	The Set Up 2	Nkoyo	
2022	What Women Want	Benita	
2022	Glamour Girls	Celeste	
2021	False Doors	Anael	
2021	One Way	Ronke	
2021	The Matron	Dr Winnie	
2021	One Lagos Night	Ada	
2020	Citation	Rachel	
2020	Uneven	Kiki	
2020	Daughters	Idara	
2020	Who's the Boss	Pretty Woman 1	
2020	Jumbled	Esther	
2019	AMCOP: Cladestine	Dubra	
2019	Rickety	Ivy	
2019	Adaife		
