= The Smart Money Woman =

Nigerian TV series

- Written by: Pearl Osibu, Jola Ayeye
- Directed by: Bunmi Ajakaiye
- Starring: Osas Ighodaro; Kemi Lala Akindoju; Timini Egbuson; Toni Tones; Ini Dima-Okojie
- Narrated by: Arese Ugwu
- Country of origin: Nigeria
- Original language: English
- No. of seasons: 2
- No. of episodes: 17

Production
- Executive producer: Arese Ugwu
- Producer: Isoken Ogiemwonyi Akintunde Marinho Kemi Lala Akindoju
- Production locations: Lagos, Lagos State, Nigeria
- Editor: Holmes Awa

Original release
- Release: present

The Smart Money Woman is a Nigerian TV series based on a 2016 novel of the same name by Arese Ugwu. The series premiered on Africa Magic Showcase in September 2020. The series was filmed to exclusively dramatise the novel. The series which initially aired as a single season of 13 episodes on Africa magic was released on Netflix as a single season with 7 episodes on Netflix on 16 September 2021. It was executively produced by the writer of the novel, Arese Ugwu and produced by Isoken Ogiemwonyi, Akintunde Marinho, Kemi Lala Akindoju. It starred Osas Ighodaro, Timini Egbuson, Ini Dima-Okojie, Kemi Lala Akindoju and many others.

== Plot summary ==
The Smart Money Woman revolves around five young women and how they take control of their finances and assets, the series focuses on spending culture of women and how it ultimately affects their finances on the long run, the series also talks about how friendship, peer pressure and societal influence can affect how we spend money, It also features and teaches how women should learn to invest in their themselves amidst romantic and financial losses. it also has some addendum quotes on how to become a smart money woman and also discusses challenges women face with societal pressure and desire to meet up with standards.

== Episodes ==
No.	Title	Directed by	Written by	Original release date
1	"1"	Bunmi Ajakaiye	Pearl Osibu, Jola Ayeye, Arese Ugwu	September 16, 2021
The episode opens with business-minded Zuri played by Osas Ighodaro in a very difficult state as her wealthy boyfriend has just broken up with her, her car has an issue and her job is also hanging in a balance with her financial life struggling badly.
2	"2"	Bunmi Ajakaiye	Pearl Osibu, Jola Ayeye, Arese Ugwu	September 16, 2021
Episode 2 sees frustrated Zuri resorting to learning how to manage her finances now, following the storms she has faced earlier, Zuri now sticks to a low-budget lifestyle while consciously cutting out those irrelevant expenses. It also shows Adesuwa, a successful Lawyer played by Kemi Lala Akindoju, who however has some issues in her marital life with her cheating husband and mother-in-law.
3	"3"	Bunmi Ajakaiye	Pearl Osibu, Jola Ayeye, Arese Ugwu	September 16, 2021
Episode 3 focuses on one of the ladies, Tami played by Ini Dima-Okojie, who happens to not be prudent with her finances and it now affects her business while also focuses on Zuri and how she squarely faced her financial shortcoming and was ready to beat them.
4	"4"	Bunmi Ajakaiye	Pearl Osibu, Jola Ayeye, Arese Ugwu	September 16, 2021
Zuri finally decides to know Tsola, an admirer who has been on her for a while, but Zuri constant rejects his advances, she now finally decides to get to know him more, while the other ladies navigate around various problems encountered in their financial and relationship life.
5	"5"	Bunmi Ajakaiye	Pearl Osibu, Jola Ayeye, Arese Ugwu	September 16, 2021
Tsola finally asks Zuri out and everything was going on smoothly, Adesuwa still constantly suffer cheat and disregard in her marital life and her husband continues to mistreat her.
6	"6"	Bunmi Ajakaiye	Pearl Osibu, Jola Ayeye, Arese Ugwu	September 16, 2021
Tami's bad money spending choices begins to haunt her as she begins to experience some problem in her business.
7	"7"	Bunmi Ajakaiye	Pearl Osibu, Jola Ayeye, Arese Ugwu	September 16, 2021
Despite all the challenges the ladies faced, financially and romantically, they have all now decided that investing in themselves is what is of paramount importance to them.

== Selected cast ==
- Osas Ighodaro as Zuri
- Kemi Lala Akindoju as Adesuwa
- Toni Tones as Lara
- Ebenezer Eno as Ladun
- Eku Edewor as Banke
- Timini Egbuson as Bobby
- Ini Dima-Okojie as Tami
- Seun Ajayi as Soji
- Nonso Bassey as Olumide Sanni

== Awards and nominations ==
Year	Award	Category	Recipient	Result	Ref
2022	Africa Magic Viewers' Choice Awards	Best Art Director	Ediri Okwa	Nominated	
2022	Africa Magic Viewers' Choice Awards	Best Costume Designer	Isoken Ogiemwonyi	Nominated	
2022	Africa Magic Viewers' Choice Awards	Best Television Series	Arese Ugwu/Isoken Ogiemwonyi/Lala Akindoju/ Akintunde Marine Marinho	Nominated	
