= The Beat 99.9 FM =

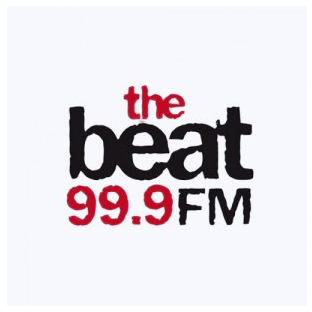
- Lagos; Nigeria
- Broadcast area: Lagos State
- Frequency: 99.9 MHz

Ownership
- Owner: Megalectrics Ltd
- Sister stations: Lagos Talks

History
- First air date: 2003

Links
- Webcast: Listen live
- Website: thebeat99.com

The Beat 99.9 FM is a Lagos based English-language radio station centered on music, information and the Nigerian entertainment industry.

== History ==
The station started broadcasting on 1 July 2003. It also produces Beat TV, a YouTube channel. It was the first African radio station to get verified on Twitter.

Olisa Adibua was the director of programs until 2019. In 2020 Tolu Oniru- Demuren became the acting Program Director.

A similar station, The Beat 97.9 FM, operates in Abuja.

== Presenters ==
=== Current ===
- Maria Okanrende
- Toolz

=== Former ===
- Dami Elebe
