= Slow Country =

Slow Country may refer to:

- Slow Country (film), a 2017 Nigerian film
- "Slow Country", a poem by David Wagoner
- "Slow Country", a 2001 song by Gorillaz from Gorillaz
