= Far from Home (TV series) =

- Written by: Dami Elebe (head writer)
- Directed by: Catherine Stewart and Kayode Kasum
- Starring: Mike Afolarin; Elma Mbadiwe; Richard Mofe-Damijo; Bimbo Akintola; Funke Akindele; Genoveva Umeh; Olumide Oworu; Adesua Etomi
- Country of origin: Nigeria

Production
- Producers: Chinaza Onuzo and Dami Elebe

Original release
- Network: Netflix
- Release: 16 December 2022

Far From Home is a drama television series and one of the first Nigerian series on Netflix. The series, written by Dami Elebe and produced by Inkblot productions premiered on Netflix on 16 December 2022. The five-part series stars Mike Afolarin, Richard Mofe-Damijo, Bimbo Akintola, Carol King, Adesua Etomi, Funke Akindele, Bolanle Ninalowo, Genoveva Umeh, Natse Jemide and a host of others.

== Synopsis ==
Far From Home tells the story of Ishaya Bello, a talented but poor teenager struggling to pursue his dream of becoming an artist. Luck shines on him when he stumbles on the rare opportunity to win a scholarship to the elite Wilmer Academy, although he is only interested in using the scholarship grant to fund his trip to London where he has been offered an apprenticeship with established artist Essien.

After his mother Patricia spends his hard-earned savings on her ailing husband, Ishaya Senior without their son's consent, thus putting paid to his ambition, Ishaya steals from the nightclub where he works as a waiter. To avoid being murdered by cartel boss Oga Rambo, he offers to peddle MDMA to the Wilmer students, although once again he is nearly killed for using Rambo's second-in-command Government's supply. While masquerading as a student, Ishaya's illicit maneuvering leads to further chaos in Wilmer, at home, and within the cartel hierarchy. After his sister is kidnapped by Rambo's gang, they carry out a similar move with Ishaya's school friend, Frank which leaves him traumatised. Rambo then attacks Wilmer Academy, which leads to more trouble for Ishaya and his family.

== Selected cast ==
- Mike Afolarin as Ishaya Bello
- Elma Mbadiwe as Carmen Wilmer-Willoughby
- Genoveva Umeh as Zina
- Bolanle Ninalowo as Oga Rambo
- Bucci Franklin as Government
- Natse Jemide as Reggie
- Richard Mofe-Damijo as Feyi Wilmer-Willoughby
- Bimbo Akintola as Mabel Wilmer-Willoughby
- Funke Akindele as Patricia Bello
- Paul Adams as Ishaya Bello Snr
- Olumide Oworu as Atlas
- Adesua Etomi as Mrs Irurhe
- Tomi Ojo as Rahila
- Linda Ejiofor as Mrs Abubakar
- Carol King as Principal Gemade
- Gbubemi Ejeye as Adufe
- Richard Tanksley as Mr. Boyle
- Deyemi Okanlawon as Essien
- Ruby Okezie as Nnenna

== Episodes ==
No.	Title	Directed by	Written by	Original release date
1	"Welcome to Wilmer"	Catherine Stewart	Dami Elebe	16 December 2022
Ishaya Bello comes from a poor family who are struggling to make ends meet, Ishaya Bello is a talented artist who really aims to become very successful at it, he got a life-changing opportunity to join the elite school on a scholarship he would have to cheat his way through to get, Ishaya fancies his chances and made the decision to steal from a dangerous group to enable him get the scholarship form to get into the elite Wilmer college, Ishaya soon puts himself and his impoverished family in crises.
2	"No Way Out"	Catherine Stewart	Dami Elebe & Chiemeka Osuagwu	16 December 2022
Following the debt Ishaya now owes Oga Rambo and Government from the money he stole to purchase the scholarship form, Oga Rambo and Government takes Ishaya's sister with them pending the time Ishaya is able to pay the money, Ishaya offers to sell ectasy at Wilmer Academy to enable him pay his debt and free his sister, Ishaya soon began to mingle with the cool rich kids in the school and he soon finds himself in a party that presented him with the opportunity to sell the ectasy.
3	"The Dr. High Effect"	Kayode Kasum	Jola Ayeye & Nkiru Njoku	16 December 2022
Following the illicit party that was held, a video of Carmen Wilmer goes viral and she has to face the consequences of her actions in school, Ishaya Bello soon starts his business fully disguising as Dr. High by secretly selling ectasy to students at Wilmer Academy.
4	"A Founder's Day Affair"	Kayode Kasum	Jola Ayeye & Nkiru Njoku	16 December 2022
Following a fire outbreak at the school, the school sought to heighten security at the school by starting a 'stop and search' activity in the school, this however didn't sit well with the students who caused chaos and protest in the school to protest the activity. The Founder's day came, and Ishaya Bello's hero and mentor, Essien came to the school and Ishaya was happy to meet his hero but he didn't get the kind of reception he wanted. Ishaya's Ex girlfriend, Adufe soon makes a costly mistake that made her and Ishaya plan to kidnap Ishaya's best friend, Frank in order to get money to solve the problem.
5	"Revelations are Forever"	Kayode Kasum	Jola Ayeye & Nkiru Njoku	16 December 2022
Following the success of the kidnap, Oga Rambo wants them to start kidnapping business officially and Adufe inspired that their next target be Carmen Wilmer (whom Ishaya is now getting close to), in a bid to stop them, Ishaya reports the whole matter to the school authority who then visits rush to arrest Oga Rambo and his accomplice, unfortunately for them, they only arrested Government leaving Oga Rambo, Adufe and Baido escaping, Rambo then attacks Wilmer Academy in a bid to get Carmen Wilmer and Ishaya Bello.

== Production and release ==
Far From Home produced by Inkblot Productions is the First Nigerian Young Adult (YA) Netflix Original series also doubles as the first young adult genre coming out of West Africa. The premiere of the movie held in Lagos on 14 December 2022 and it featured host of celebrities in attendance.
