= Out of Luck (2015 film) =

- Directed by: Niyi Akinmolayan
- Screenplay by: Chinaza Onuzo
- Produced by: Chinaza Onuzo
- Starring: Tope Tedela; Linda Ejiofor; Adeniyi Johnson; Femi Branch; Adesua Etomi; Wole Ojo; Sambasa Nzeribe; Jide Kosoko; Chigul
- Cinematography: Austin Nwaolie
- Edited by: Victoria Akujobi
- Production company: Inkblot Productions
- Distributed by: FilmOne Distribution
- Release date: 4 December 2015
- Country: Nigeria
- Languages: English; Pidgin

Out of Luck is a 2015 Nigerian drama thriller film written by Chinaza Onuzo and directed by Niyi Akinmolayan. It stars Tope Tedela, Linda Ejiofor, Femi Branch, Adesua Etomi, Sambasa Nzeribe, Wole Ojo with cameo appearances by Jide Kosoko and Chigul. It was released on 4 December 2015.

== Cast ==
- Tope Tedela as Dayo
- Linda Ejiofor as Halima
- Femi Branch as Innocent
- Jide Kosoko
- Adeniyi Johnson as Yinka
- Adesua Etomi as Bisola
- Wole Ojo as Seun
- Sambasa Nzeribe as Tanimu
- Bolaji Ogunmola
- Chigul
- Kunle Remi

== Production ==
In October 2015, a full length trailer was released for the film.
