= Shawn Faqua =

Nigerian actor

- Citizenship: Nigerian
- Education: University of Port Harcourt
- Occupations: Actor, model, presenter
- Known for: Vincent in Lagos Cougars
- Notable work: Lagos Cougars

Shawn Faqua (/ˈfækwə/ FAK-wə; born 6 June) is a Nigerian actor, model and presenter. He is known for playing the role of Vincent in Lagos Cougars, as Rambo in Dare Olaitan's Ojukokoro and Chuks in Emem Isong's Code of Silence. His performance in Lagos Cougars earned him four award nominations across Africa including Best Young/Promising Actor at the 10th Africa Movie Academy Awards.

== Education ==
Faqua studied at the University of Port Harcourt where he obtained a degree in electrical engineering. He began modelling, appearing in billboards and hosting several shows along with stage acting, directing, choreography and singing.

In 2012, Faqua obtained a certificate in acting from the Nollywood Upgrade Training in affiliation with the Center for Digital Imaging Arts at Boston University. In 2014, he transitioned to acting full time.

== Career ==
Faqua is a method actor and is known for researching roles and accents as required by character he portrays. In Charles Novia's Put a Ring on it, Faqua plays the female character Cleopatra and also portrays the character Peter. Many of the productions he has been featured in address themes such as love, politics, culture, human rights, conflict, rape, betrayal, selfless service and sacrifice.

Faqua has appeared in Africa Magic's Out of the Ghetto (2015), After the Proposal (2015), Oasis (TV series), Red Card (2015), The Twin Sword (2014), A Love Like Ours (2011), Four Crooks and a Rookie (2011), Ebony Life's A New You (2013) and others.

Besides screen acting, Faqua has performed in several stage plays. He has modelled for Lagos Business School, Guaranty Trust Bank, First City Monument Bank, fashion shows and other organisations. He also recorded a song for the short film, The Good Life, performing the original soundtrack titled "I wan blow". He also acted in the short film "Siraam" written and directed by Uzoamaka Powers in 2026.

== Charity ==
Faqua has been involved with charity work since 2004 and has supported the Nigerian Red Cross. He was an executive of the Youth Against HIV and AIDS in collaboration with the then first lady of Nigeria Stella Obasanjo and the NUGA games which focused on educating youths about voluntary counselling and testing (VCT) for HIV. Faqua was also the president of the Youth Against Drug Abuse and Child Trafficking (YAWAT) in Abuja. In 2016, he partnered with the Nigerian Army on the Fallen Heroes project appearing in the short film Separated.

== Other works ==
Faqua has been featured on talk shows such as Heart of the Matter, Twitchat with Blecyn and Tribe Stories among others. He has also hosted shows like Urban Royale magazine launch and Retro 52, an independence day event. He has expressed interest in youth engagement and social advocacy through entertainment.

== Personal life ==
Faqua has stated that he is drawn to roles that are dramatic, challenging, cheesy, intense and comical. He enjoys reading, dancing, playing tennis, traveling and watching films. He resides in Lagos.

== Selected filmography ==
Year	Title	Role	Notes
2010	The Last Ritual		
2011	A love like ours		
2011	Four crooks and a Rookie	Lune	
2012	Lagos cougars	Vincent	
2012	Gidi up		Series
2013	After the proposal		
2013	A New You	Wale	
2013	Render to Caesar		
2014	Acquired taste		Short film
2014	Oasis	KK	Series
2015	Red Card		
2015	Out of the Ghetto		
2016	Head over Heels		Series
2016	Ojukokoro	Rambo	
2016	Zahra	Jacob	
2016	Esohe	Prince	
2017	In Line	Steve	
2017	The Door		
2017	Sugar Boy		
2017	August visitor		
2017	Mascara		Series
2017	3some	Williams	
2017	No way out	Bovi	
2018	King of Boys	Alaaru	
2018	God Calling		
2019	Three Thieves	Oreva	
2019	Living in bondage: Breaking Free	Tobie Nworie	
2020	Witches	Leke	
2021	Soole	Driver	
2022	The Blood Covenant	Osiano	
2023	The House of Secrets	Panam	
2023	Osato	Jungle	
2024	Funmilayo Ransome-Kuti	Bekolari Ransome-Kuti	Biography / Drama / Romance
2024	Shina	AY	

== Awards and nominations ==
Year	Award	Category	Work	Result	Ref
2014	Africa Movie Academy Award	Best Young Actor	Lagos Cougar	Nominated	
2014	Nollywood Movies Awards	Best Rising Star	Lagos Cougar	Nominated	
2014	Nigeria Entertainment Awards	Best Supporting Actor	Lagos Cougar	Nominated	
2014	Golden Icons Academy Movie Award	Most Promising Actor	—N/a	Nominated	
2015	Golden Movie Awards	Golden Supporting Actor (Drama)		Nominated	
2017	World Music & Independent Film Festival	Best Supporting Actor	3 some	Nominated	
2018	Best of Nollywood Awards	Best Actress in a Lead Role – Yoruba	Personal Assistant	Won	
2022	Africa Magic Viewers' Choice Awards	Best Actor in A Comedy	Soole	Nominated	

== See also ==
- List of Nigerian actors
