= Sulaiman Ladani =

- Occupations: Actor, broadcaster and voice actor
- Years active: 2000s–present

Sulaiman Ladani is a Nigerian actor, broadcaster and voice actor. He has worked in radio, television and commercial voice production. He is known for his role as Yakubu in the 2025 film The Herd and for his appearance in MTV Shuga Naija.

== Early life and career ==
Sulaiman Ladani is from Nasarawa State and grew up in Jos. He later moved to Lagos.

He has worked in broadcasting, acting and voice production. His broadcasting work has included Radio Continental, Correct FM, Urban Radio and Jay 101.9 FM in Jos. He has also worked as a commercial voice actor. His voice credits include a brand voice for Close-Up in 2006.

== Acting career ==
In 2017, he was announced as part of the cast of MTV Shuga Naija. He joined actors including Rahama Sadau, Nobert Young, Funlola Aofiyebi-Raimi, Ozzy Agu, Shawn Faqua and Yakubu Mohammed.

He later appeared in Daniel Etim-Effiong's crime thriller The Herd. He played Yakubu, a member of the kidnapping gang in the film.

His performance as Yakubu attracted attention from viewers. NollywoodCV reported that a viewer described the character as the actor who frightened her most in the film, despite his limited screen time.

== Premium Times dispute ==
In September 2026, he called out Premium Times over the credit for his role in The Herd. He said the newspaper had identified Ibrahim Abubakar as the actor who played Yakubu instead of him.

According to him, the incorrect credit was later repeated on other websites and affected how people found information about him online. He said people looking for the actor who played Yakubu could instead find Abubakar's name. He also said the error had affected acting opportunities because people looking to contact him for work could not find him.

He said he contacted Premium Times about the matter and was asked to submit his complaint in writing. He said he did so and asked Premium Times to correct the credit.

== Filmography ==
Year	Title	Role
2018	MTV Shuga Naija	Cast member
2025	The Herd	Yakubu
