= Jola Ayeye =

Nigerian podcaster

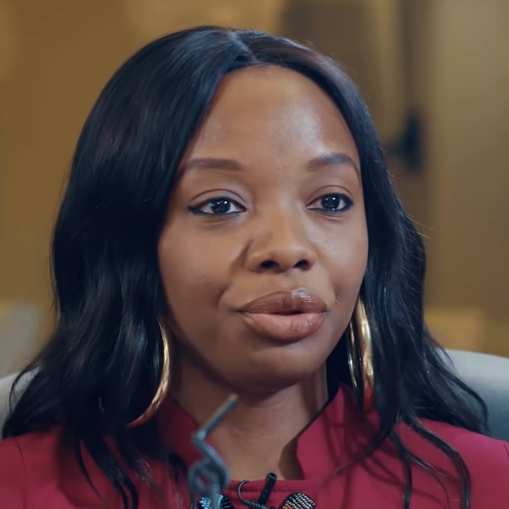
- Jola Ayeye giving a talk.
- April 27, 1992 (age 34)

Jọláolúwa Ayẹyẹ popularly known as Jola Ayeye or Jollz is a Nigerian podcaster, media personality, and screenwriter. Along with FK Abudu, she hosts the I Said What I Said, one of the biggest podcasts on the continent. She is also the founding member of the Feminist Coalition, a Nigerian feminist group.

== Career ==
Ayeye was born April 27 1992. She has a degree in politics and philosophy from University of Durham, United Kingdom. After graduation, she returned to Nigeria where she started working at Big Cabal Media. In 2017, she co-founded the I Said What I Said podcast with FK Abudu. The podcast is now in its eight season. She later founded a film production company called Salt & Truth in 2018, which does film production. She's also the founder of the "Happy Noisemaker" book club.

As a screenwriter, Ayeye has credit on a number of TV shows like Far From Home (2022 series) and The Smart Money Woman.
