= Dami Elebe =

Nigerian screenwriter, artist, musician and radio personality

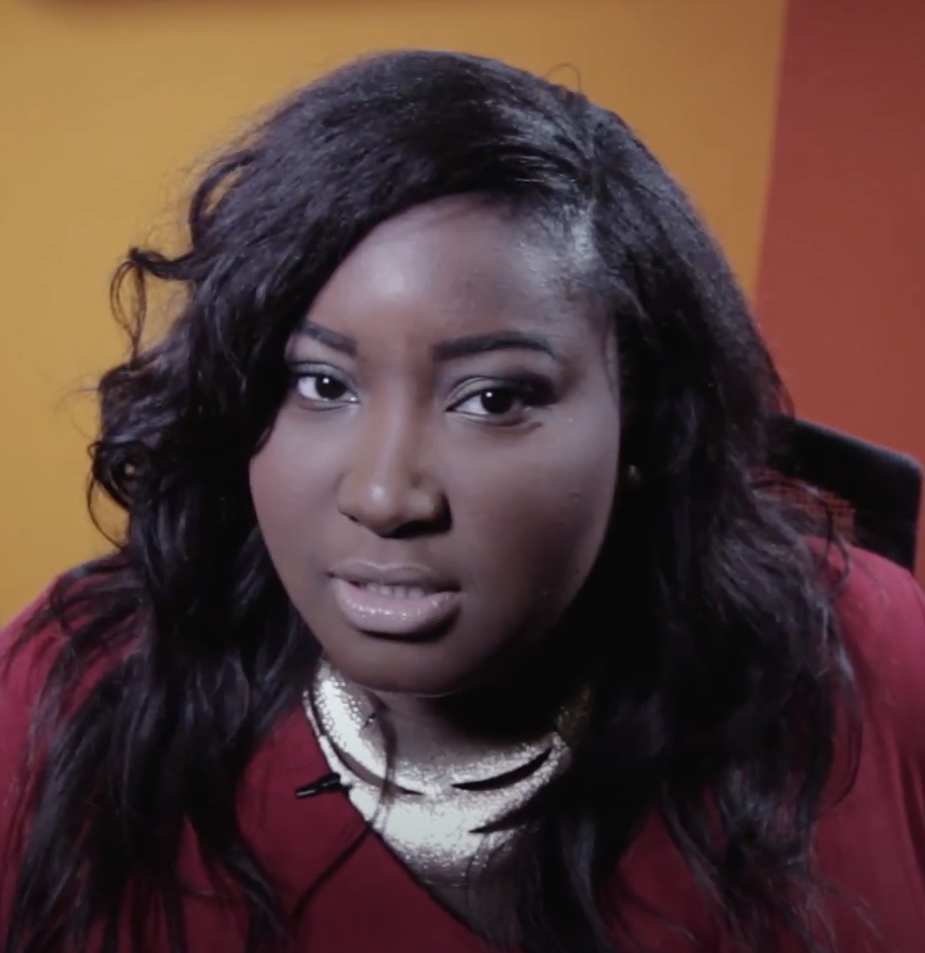
- Born: Dami Elebe
- Education: Lee University, USA
- Occupations: OAP, Screenwriter, Artist, Musician
- Years active: -present

Dami Elebe is a Nigerian screenwriter, musician, and on-air personality. Elebe is known for web series like Skinny Girl In Transit, Rumour Has It, and Far from Home. She studied advertising and art.

== Career ==
Elebe was an on-air personality (OAP) at Classic FM, Beat FM and Naija FM in the space of 7 years and wrote the movie, Up North which was directed by Tope Oshin. At the ELOY Awards in 2018, she received the Scriptwriter Of The Year award. Her debut film was From Lagos With Love, which was at the cinemas in August 2018. She worked with Sharon Ooja, Nonso Bassey, Jon Ogah, Etim Effiong, Damilola Adegbite, and Shaffy Bello.

On August 7, 2018, she announced on her official Instagram page that she will be leaving Beat FM, describing her time with the radio station as having been a 'great ride'.
