= Ile Owo =

2022 Nigerian film

- Directed by: Dare Olaitan
- Written by: Dare Olaitan
- Produced by: Dare Olaitan; Kayode Ksaum
- Starring: Immaculata Oko-Kasum; Efe Iwara; Tina Mba; Akin Lewis; Sophie Alakija
- Release date: June 24, 2022
- Running time: 95 minutes
- Country: Nigeria
- Language: English

Ile Owo is a 2022 Nigerian psychological thriller film written and directed by Dare Olaitan, and features Immaculate Oko Kasum, Tina Mba, Efa Iwara, and Mofe Duncan. It tells the story of a family entwined in a centuries-old pact - the sacrifice of a young virgin to preserve immortality.

== Synopsis ==
Busola (Immaculate Oko Kasum) - a young nurse with an invalid father and a commitment-phobic fiancé - discovers a deity outside on her way to work which mysteriously disappears when she summons her deeply spiritual mother (Tina Mba). The latter senses unfamiliarity around the house, and hands her daughter blessed olive oil which she promises to take with her everywhere. After she breaks up with her boyfriend Lanre, Busola is left frustrated, particularly after a subsequent date goes awry, until she tends to Tunji (Efa Iwara), a wealthy patient who takes a shine to her. Bisola, whose pastor had recently prophesied that she would soon marry a suitable man that year, sees his advances as a sign, but her mother does not approve although her father takes his daughter's side.

With the help of her friend Jola (Bukunmi Adeaga-Ilori), Busola - who is preparing for a dinner date - receives a makeover, wearing the jewellery Tunji had gifted her as part of her ensemble. At dinner aboard his yacht, Bisola experiences strange events linked to her necklace. Sensing danger, her mother tries to protect her daughter through prayers, but her husband, prompted by evil spirits, halts her session by knocking her unconscious. She is rushed to hospital, and Tunji offers to accommodate both Busola and her father while she recovers. Following a series of nightmares depicting disaster, she dies from her injuries days later, and a heartbroken Busola seeks comfort from Tunji, who extends an invitation to meet his family.

Events take a darker turn when Busola's family visit turns into a nightmarish scenario involving sacrificial rituals and supernatural forces, forcing her to fight for her life.

== Cast ==
- Immaculate Oko Kasum as Busola
- Efe Iwara as Tunji Owo
- Tina Mba as Mama Busola
- Akin Lewis as Papa Busola
- Bisola Aiyeola as Fijabi
- Mofe Duncan as Damisi Owo
- Sophie Alakija as Tomisin
- Ademola Adedoyin as Tobi Owo
- Bukunmi Adeag-ilori as Jola
- Temisan Emmanuel as Juwon Owo
- Ikponmwosa Gold as Pastor Niran
- Jide Oyegbile as Akanni Owo
- Funmbi Sokoya as Waiter

== Reception ==
The film received mixed reactions from critics, some film critics stated that "the film had potential to start a horror revolution but missed the mark" according to Afrocritik. Ile Owo was praised for its cinematography but criticized for its lack of depth

== Awards and nominations ==
Year	Award	Category	Result	Ref
2023	Africa Magic Viewers' Choice Awards	Best Actress In A Drama, Movie Or TV Series	Nominated	
2023	Africa Magic Viewers' Choice Awards	Best Overall Movie	Nominated	
2023	Africa Magic Viewers' Choice Awards	Best Picture Editor	Nominated	
