= Tope Tedela =

Nigerian actor (born 1990)

- Tedela at the 2020 Africa Magic Viewers Choice Awards
- Born: Temitope Christopher Tedela; 5 June 1990 (age 36); Lagos, Nigeria
- Education: University of Lagos
- Occupations: Producer; Actor
- Years active: 2006–present
- Known for: All the Colours of the World Are Between Black and White, Blood Sisters, A Mile from Home
- Awards: Best Actor In A Drama at 2014 Africa Magic Viewers Choice Awards; Most Promising Actor (nom) at 10th Africa Movie Academy Awards; Best Actor in a Leading Role (English) at 2014 Best of Nollywood Awards

Temitope Christopher Tedela (born 5 June 1990) is a Nigerian actor and producer. He has received several awards for his work including Africa Magic Viewers' Choice Award, Nigeria Entertainment Award, Best of Nollywood Award and Nollywood Movies Award.

His body of work includes Baby Farm (2025), All the Colours of the World Are Between Black and White (2023), Blood Sisters (2022), Country Hard (2021), The Lost Okoroshi (2019), What Lies Within (2017), Slow Country (2017), Ojukokoro (2017), Suru L'ere (2016), A Soldier's Story (2015) and A Mile from Home which earned him several accolades.

== Early life and education ==
Temitope Christopher Tedela, the first of four children, was born in Lagos, Nigeria on 5 June 1990. He is of descent from Ekiti State. He attended Lagos State Model College, Meiran, Lagos for his secondary education and earned a degree in Mass Communication from the University of Lagos.

== Career ==
While studying at the University of Lagos, Tedela was cast in his screen debut as Julian in the family TV Series Edge of Paradise. He stopped acting for a while to concentrate on his studies; while in school and shortly after graduation, Tedela worked as an on-air personality at UNILAG FM. He made a return to star as Lala in his first leading role in the feature film A Mile from Home, gaining prominence through the role. At one time, Tedela was a news anchor at the NTA. He acted in several notable stage performances.

In 2015, Tedela starred in A Soldier's Story and Out of Luck. Tedela's role as metrosexual Kyle Stevens-Adedoyin in the 2016 comedy film Suru L'ere earned him many rave reviews.

Tedela starred in these well-received films in 2017: the epic King Invincible, the comedy-crime/heist film Ojukokoro and the action-drama Slow Country. He made his producing debut with the drama thriller film What Lies Within.

In 2018, Tedela appeared in the crime film, Knock Out Blessing.

In 2019, he starred as researcher Dr Dauda in The Lost Okoroshi which had its world premiere at the 2019 Toronto International Film Festival and received mostly positive reviews. He also began work on his one-man play Whumanizer. Tedela also starred in the gripping drama film, The Ghost and the House of Truth.

In 2020, Tedela was cast in Netflix's first Nigerian original series helmed by award-winning director Akin Omotoso.

In 2022, he portrayed Dr Adeboye/The Good Doctor in the Netflix original series Blood Sisters.

Tedela received acclaim for his work in the award winning film All the Colours of the World Are Between Black and White which won several awards including the Berlinale Teddy Award. Of his performance, Michael Joseph Jenner wrote: "with his silent moments of reflection being beautifully portrayed by Tope Tedela, whose performance is very quiet and internal, but simmers with an understated complexity that only grows as the film continues to explore his voyage of self-examination, portraying his efforts to feel less lost and isolated in a rapidly changing world, although one in which his identity is still a source of considerable contention amongst those who are more aligned with traditional values".

In 2025, Tedela played Nurse Chinedu in the Netflix series Baby Farm.

== Other work ==
In 2016, Tedela was named an ambassador by Global Rights, an international human rights organization to start a campaign to end sexual violence in the country.

== Awards and nominations ==
Year	Award	Category	Work	Result
2014	10th Africa Movie Academy Awards	Most Promising Actor	A Mile from Home	Nominated
2014	2014 Africa Magic Viewers Choice Awards	Best Actor In A Drama	A Mile from Home	Won
2014	2014 Best of Nollywood Awards	Best Actor in a Leading Role (English)	A Mile from Home	Won
2014	2014 Best of Nollywood Awards	Revelation of the Year (Male)	A Mile from Home	Nominated
2014	2014 Golden Icons Academy Movie Awards	Most Promising Actor	A Mile from Home	Won
2014	2014 Golden Icons Academy Movie Awards	Best On-Screen Duo	A Mile from Home	Nominated
2014	2014 Nigeria Entertainment Awards	Best Actor in a Lead Role	A Mile from Home	Won
2014	2014 Nollywood Movies Awards	Best Actor in a Leading Role (English)	A Mile from Home	Nominated
2014	2014 Nollywood Movies Awards	Best Rising Star (Male)	A Mile from Home	Won
2014	2014 Express Star Awards	Rising Star	Himself	Won
2016	City People Entertainment Awards	Best Actor in a Supporting Role	Suru L'ere	Nominated
2016	Nigeria Entertainment Awards	Best Actor in Supporting Role	Suru L'ere	Nominated
2017	Best of Nollywood Awards	Best Actor in a Supporting Role	Slow Country	Nominated
2020	Best of Nollywood Awards	Best Supporting Actor –English	Country Hard	Nominated
2022	Africa Magic Viewers' Choice Awards	Best Supporting Actor	Country Hard	Nominated
2023	Africa Magic Viewers' Choice Awards	Best Actor In A Drama, Movie Or TV Series	All the Colours of the World Are Between Black and White	Nominated

== Filmography ==
=== Film ===
Year	Title	Role	Notes	Ref
2003	King Invincible			
2007	Twisted	Sola	with Joan Agabi	
2013	Awakening		with O. C. Ukeje	
2013	Torn	Young Olumide	with Monalisa Chinda	
2013	A Mile from Home	Lala/Jude Odaro	with Joan Agabi	
2013	Cyanide	Emeka	Short Film	
2014	Another Day to Die Young	Comrade	TV film	
2014	Birthday Bash	Scoda	with Yul Edochie	
2014	Leeway	Chuks	Short Film	
2015	Lunch Time Heroes	Deji	with Omoni Oboli & Dakore Akande	
2015	Apostates	Osas		
2015	A Soldier's Story	Major Egan	with Daniel K. Daniel	
2015	Out of Luck	Dayo	with Adesua Etomi	
2016	Suru L'ere	Kyle Stevens Adedoyin	with Rita Dominic	
2016	Ojukokoro (Greed)	Sunday	with Wale Ojo	
2017	Catch.er			
2017	King Invincible	Taari	with Gabriel Afolayan	
2017	Slow Country	Osas	with Majid Michel	
2017	What Lies Within	Gboyega	also Producer	
2018	Knock Out Blessing	Yomi	directed by Dare Olaitan	
2019	The Lost Okoroshi	Dr. Dauda	with Seun Ajayi	
2019	The Ghost and the House of Truth	Barrister Tokunbo	with Kate Henshaw	
2020	Finding Hubby	Pastor T	with Rosemary Abazie	
2021	The Therapist	Rufus	with Rita Dominic and Toyin Abraham	
2021	Country Hard	Ochuko	with Kehinde Bankole and Timini Egbuson	
2021	Ponzi			
2022	Cake	Tomiwa Akinlolu	with Saskay, Patience Ozokwor	
2023	All the Colours of the World Are Between Black and White	Bambino	with Riyo David, Martha Ehinome	
2024	Shina	Ugo	with Linda Ejiofor, Timini Egbuson	
2024	Silence	Dapo Popoola	with Efa Iwara, Ade Laoye	
2024	Casa de Novia	Ancel	with Eso Dike, Chieke Donald	
2025	Baby Farm		with Joseph Benjamin, Rita Dominic	

=== Television ===
Year	Title	Role	Notes
2006	Edge of Paradise	Julian	
2008	My Mum & I	June	
2008	Super Story (Omojuwa)	Tesiro	
2012	Burning Point		
2012	Tweeters	Kunle	
2013	Super Story (The Secret)	Tai	
2014	Oasis	Oreva	
2015	The Team	Efe	
2016	Jamestown	Lucky	
2017	Jemeji	Obi	Chief
2019	Powder Dry	Arthur	
2019	Underbelly	Nonso	
2022	Blood Sisters	Dr Adeboye/The Good Doctor	A Netflix Original

=== Theatre ===
Year	Title	Role	Notes
2011	Man Talk, Woman Talk	Emeka	
2014	Diagnosis	Emeka	
2014	The Agency	Fawaz	
2019	The Mistress of Wholesome	Nengak Josiah	
2019	The Wives	Lawyer	
2019	Whumanizer	Tunde Bridges	
