= The Lost Okoroshi =

2019 Nigerian film

- Directed by: Abba Makama
- Written by: Abba Makama, Africa Ukoh
- Produced by: Abba Makama
- Starring: Seun Ajayi; Judith Audu; Tope Tedela; Ifu Ennada; Chiwetalu Agu
- Cinematography: Mike Omonua
- Edited by: Abba Makama
- Music by: Shay Who
- Production companies: Osiris Film and Entertainment
- Release date: 2019
- Country: Nigeria
- Languages: Igbo language, Pidgin English and English

The Lost Okoroshi is a 2019 Nigerian film produced, directed and edited by Abba Makama under the production studio of Osiris Film and Entertainment. The movie links the African traditional belief system with modernity.

== Plot ==
The film revolves around a young security guard, Raymond, who is melancholic because of the extinction of traditional and cultural antiquities of his country. In his dreams he begins to receive messages from Okoroshi, a traditional Igbo spirit. One day he wakes up transformed into Okoroshi and begins a spiritual journey.

== Premiere ==
It was premiered globally at the Toronto International Film Festival (TIFF) in September 2019 also screened at Vevey International Funny Films Festival. It was released in 2020 on Netflix.

== Cast ==
- Seun Ajayi as Raymond
- Judith Audu as Nneka
- Tope Tedela as Dr. Dauda
- Ifu Ennada as Sarafina
- Chiwetalu Agu as Chief Okonkwo
- Ozzy Agu as Elder Nwankwo
- Demi Banwo as Mr. Osagie
- Ibrahim Jammal as Musa
- Destiny Osagiede as Okoroshi 1
- Donald Jonah as Jagar
- Don Ekwuazi as Thief / Oscar
- Adedayo Davies as Chief Mbanefo
- Eric Obinna as Elder Obi
- Kelechi Udegbe as Vice President of Secret Society
- Olaye Benjamin as Okoroshi Double
- Crystabel Goddy as Goldie
