= Dare Olaitan =

Nigerian film director and producer (born 1990)

- Born: November 28, 1990 (age 35); Ikeja, Lagos
- Education: Illinois Wesleyan University
- Years active: 2014 - Present
- Notable work: Ojukokoro, Blessing Knockout, Dwindle, Ile Owo
- Parents: Oladipo Olaitan (father); Remi Olaitan (mother)

Dare Olaitan (born November 28, 1990) is a Nigerian filmmaker, producer, writer, and director. He is best known for the film Ojukokoro (2016). The film received two nominations at the Africa Movie Academy Awards (AMAA). he also directed Knockout Blessing (2018), which won Africa Movie Academy Awards in 2019, Dwindle, Ile Owo, Obara’M and Ègún.

== Early life ==
His father, Oladipo Olaitan was the financial secretary of Afenifere, a Yoruba cultural body.

Olaitan studied Economics and Business Management at the Illinois Wesleyan University. While studying in Illinois, he started having an interest in filmmaking following the school's last project.

Olaitan initially considered pursuing a Master’s degree in Business after completing his undergraduate degree. However, his renewed interest in filmmaking led him to a career change. He enrolled in the Cinematic Arts Department (formerly known as Colorado Film School) at Community College of Aurora, Denver.

== Career ==
Olaitan’s filmmaking career began during his National Youth Service Corp (NYSC) placement at a film production company in Ikeja, Lagos.

His movie, Ojukokoro was nominated at the Africa Movie Academy Awards in 2018 for Best Screenplay and Best Nigerian Film. During the production of Ojukokoro, he crossed paths with another film producer Olufemi Ogunsanwo who provided mentorship and industry specific guidance, facilitating Olaitan’s integration into the Nigerian film industry.

In 2018, Olaitan wrote and directed Knockout Blessing, a movie which explores the story of an ambitious female boxer who finds herself entangled in the world of political corruption. Knockout Blessing was nominated for Best Nigerian Film and Best Visual Effects at the 2019 Africa Movie Academy Awards.

Olaitan co-directed the film Dwindle (2021) with Kayode Kasum. The film focuses on two men who hijack a car and re-purpose it as a makeshift taxi, and their fate takes a turn when they stumble upon a kidnaped governor. The following year he worked on Kayode’s musical Obara’M (2022). The film follows a young musician who struggles with her past mistakes after the death of her estranged father. The film was nominated for Best Movie West Africa in 2023 at Africa Magic Viewers' Choice Awards.

In his interview with the Vanguard, he expressed his belief in the untapped potential of horror and psychological thriller genres within the Nollywood industry. Olaitan indicated a desire to explore these genres with the intention of crafting memorable cinematic experiences for audiences.

According to Pulse News, he is the top 5 movie director in 2022 for his movie Ojukokoro. Olaitan’s dive into the horror genre came in 2022 with his release of Ile Owo. The film, which attracted mixed critical reception, centered on a female nurse that just left a bad relationship and seeks a fresh start and her life changes when she encounters a seemingly perfect man, who harbors dark secrets. The film was nominated for Best Picture Editor and Best Overall Movie in 2023 at Africa Magic Viewers' Choice Awards. The movie was also made available on Netflix in 2023.

In 2023, Olaitan continued expanding his filmography into the horror genre, with the horror-thriller Ègún. The film's narrative revolves around an office where a seemingly innocuous package has supernatural contents, which forces the employees to fight for survival. In an interview with The Guardian, Olaitan mentions filmmakers Guillermo del Toro and Robert Rodriguez as directors that inspired him because they came from an industry with limited resources, similar to Nollywood and held on to their vision of reaching a more international audience.

== Filmography ==
Year	Film	Role			Notes
Year	Film	Producer	Director	Writer	Notes
2016	Ojukokoro	Yes	Yes	Yes	Got two nominations at AMAA in 2018
2018	Knockout Blessing	Yes	Yes	Yes	Got two nominations in 2019 at AMAA
2021	Dwindle	Yes	Yes	Yes	Starring Actor won an award at AMVCA and actress was nominated at AMVCA in 2022
2022	Obara'M	Yes	No	No	got nominated at AMVCA in 2023
2022	Ile Owo	Yes	Yes	Yes	got two nominations and actress was nominated at AMVCA 2023
2023	Egun	No	No	Yes	Also written by Kayode Kasum

== Awards and nominations ==
Year	Award	Category	Film	Result	Ref
2018	Africa Movie Academy Awards	Best Nigerian Film, Best Screenplay	Ojukokoro	Nominated	
2019	Africa Movie Academy Awards	Best Nigerian Film, Best Visual Effects	Knockout Blessing	Nominated	
2023	Africa Magic Viewer's Choice Awards	Best Movie West Africa	Obara'M	Nominated	
2023	Africa Magic Viewer's Choice Awards	Best Overall Movie, Best Picture Editor	Ile Owo	Nominated	
