= Stephanie Coker =

Nigerian actress

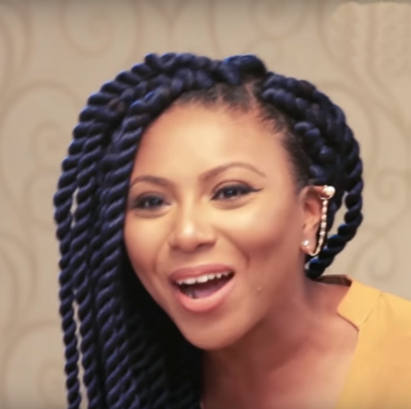
- Born: November 28, 1988 (age 37); Lagos, Lagos State, Nigeria
- Education: Brunel University London
- Occupations: OAP; Actress; Vlogger; Businesswoman
- Known for: TV Presenter at MTV Base Africa
- Spouse: Olumide David Aderinokun

Stephanie Coker (born Stephanie Omowunmi Eniafe Coker; 28 November 1988), is a Nigerian on-air personality and a television presenter for MTV Base Africa and EbonyLife TV She also featured as 'Feke' in the popular Nigerian TV series Tinsel. and a popular sitcom program Hustle as "Cindy".

== Early life ==
Coker was born in Lagos, but moved to North London, in the UK at the age of 1. She attended St Mary’s Church of England Primary school in North London, a place she described as "a really small school where Christianity was taken very seriously". She later graduated from Brunel University with a degree in Media and Communications.

While at Brunel, she interned at MTV, Channel Four and Media Moguls PR.

== Career ==
=== London ===
In 2010, Stephanie won the MTV Freederm Presenter Competition, which saw her starring in a TV advert.

That same year (2010), she was commissioned by OHTV, (UK) for her documentary work on young Nigerians called Christmas in Lagos.

In 2011, Stephanie trained with Media Trust on their TV diversity programme London 360, a Community Channel (UK), magazine-style news show, offered her a role as a presenter.

=== Nigeria ===
Stephanie Coker moved back to Nigeria in 2011 and got her first job with MTV Base Africa as an anchor of the countdown show Street Request.

Since then, she has worked on various projects and shows such as Cool FM Midday Oasis Show, MTV Big Friday Show (with Basketmouth), Tinsel on Africa Magic.

In 2013, alongside Bovi and Pearl, she co-hosted the Guinness Colourful World of more concert, an event earlier scheduled to be anchored by Bow Wow.

In 2015, she was featured on the cover page of the Exquisite Magazine's "Love Edition".

In 2016 she became the host for The Voice Nigeria.

In 2021 she hosted the maiden Edition of De9jaspirit Talent Hunt

=== Radio ===
On 6 December 2013, Baileys Nigeria announced Stephanie Coker and Veronica Ebie-Odeka as the hosts of the newradio show: Baileys Boutique.

== Filmography ==
Year	Film	Role	Notes
2025	Aso Ebi Diaries		
2020	Fate of Alakada		
2016	Hustle (TV series)	Cindy	
2001	Ice Planet	Exotic Chanteuse	

== Awards and nominations ==
In 2014, Stephanie Coker was nominated for and later won the Exquisite Lady of the Year (ELOY)'s TV Presenter of the Year.

She was also nominated for the 2014 Nigerian Broadcasters Merit Awards (NBMA) as the Nigerian Broadcaster of the year. The award was later won by Helen Paul.

== Personal life ==
On August 12, 2017, Stephanie Coker married Olumide Aderinokun, on the Greek Island of Mykonos. She gave birth to a daughter in November 2019.

She started working with Arise TV in 2018 where she works as a host for Arise TV's The Morning Show where she discusses business, tech and entertainment with industry experts.
