= Sambasa Nzeribe =

Nigerian actor, model and entertainer

- Born: Chiedozie Nzeribe Siztus; Anambra State, Nigeria
- Occupation: Actor
- Notable work: Just Not Married
- Awards: AMVCA Best Actor in a Drama

Sambasa Nzeribe (born Chiedozie Nzeribe Siztus) is a Nigerian film and television actor, model and entertainer.

== Background ==
He hails from Anambra State of Nigeria.

== Career ==
He has featured in a lot of successful Nigerian movies, including A Mile from Home (2013) Out of Luck (2015), Just Not Married (2015) Breathe of Life (2024), A Soldier's Story (2015), Hotel Choco (2016), The Wedding Party (2016), The Island (2018), Slow Country (2018), Elevator Baby (2019), Kasala (2018) and The Ghost and the Tout (2018).

== Personal life ==
Sambasa grew up in a rough environment, having lost his father early on. He grew up in Isolo, Lagos State. He developed the passion for acting while growing up and was very active with the church choir and drama groups.

== Award ==
In 2016, he won his second consecutive AMVCA for "Best Actor in a Drama".

== Filmography ==
- Four Crooks And A Rookie (2011)
- A Mile from Home (2013)
- Out of Luck (2015) as Tanimu
- Just Not Married (2015) as Ghetto
- A Soldier's Story (2015) as Ghetto
- Hotel Choco (2016)
- The Wedding Party (2016)
- My Wife & I (2017) as Emeka Okadigbo
- Slow Country (2018) as Tuvi
- The Island (2018) as Hamza
- Kasala (2018) as Bambi
- Coming From Insanity (2018) as Detective Hammed
- The Ghost and the Tout (2018) as Mike
- Elevator Baby (2019) as Stevo
- Unroyal Majesty (2020) as Prince Gozie
- Movement-Japa (2021) as Osas
- High Horse (2021) as Perfect
- Don't Leave Me (2022)
- Nze Secret (2023)
- Oloture: The Journey (2024)

== Awards and nominations ==
Year	Award ceremony	Category	Film	Result	Ref
2016	Africa Magic Viewers' Choice Awards	Best Supporting Actor in a Drama	A Soldier's Story	Won	
2017	Africa Magic Viewers' Choice Awards	Best Actor in a Drama Movie/TV Series	Slow Country	Won	
2017	Best of Nollywood Awards	Best Actor in a Lead role - English	Slow Country	Nominated	
2017	Best of Nollywood Awards	Best Supporting Actor –English	Tatu	Nominated	

== See also ==
- List of Nigerian actors
