= Hustle (Nigerian TV series) =

Nigerian television series

- Starring: Seun Ajayi; Sola Sobowale; Seyi Law; Stephanie Coker; Dorcas Fapson; Maurice Sam; Elvis Poko; Deborah Anugwa; John Joshua; Tobi Bakre; Afeez Oyetoro
- Country of origin: Nigeria
- Original languages: English; Pidgin
- No. of series: 3
- No. of episodes: 120 episodes

Production
- Executive producers: Titi Kuti; Wangi Mba-Uzoukwu
- Running time: 30 minutes

Original release
- Network: Africa Magic
- Release: 3 October 2016 – April 2019

Hustle is a Nigerian comedy-drama television series on Africa Magic starring Seun Ajayi, Sola Sobowale, Seyi Law, Stephanie Coker, Dorcas Shola-Fapson, Maurice Sam, Elvis Poko, Deborah Anugwa, John Joshua, Afeez Oyetoro, and Tobi Bakre.

== Synopsis ==
Dayo, a gullible but optimistic young man, moves to Lagos with dreams of making it big. He quickly learns that not everything is as it seems as he comes to terms with hilariously catastrophic neighbours, an antagonistic landlady, and a shady yet loyal roommate. All the characters share an unwavering hope for the future and are buoyed by the "Lagos spirit" to hustle.

== Cast ==
- Seun Ajayi as Dayo
- Sola Sobowale as Mama Sekinat
- Seyi Law as Osere
- Stephanie Coker as Cindy
- Dorcas Shola-Fapson
- Namisi Govin Emma as Seun
- Maurice Sam as Acid
- Elvis Poko as Ochuko
- Deborah Anugwa as Sekinat
- Deborah Bassey as Rosa
- John Joshua as Razaq
- Tobi Bakre
- Afeez Oyetoro as Mr. Benson

== Series overview ==
Series	Released	Producers
1	3 October 2016	Titi Kuti, Wangi Mba-Uzoukwu
2	2 October 2017	Titi Kuti, Wangi Mba-Uzoukwu
3	8 October 2018	Titi Kuti, Wangi Mba-Uzoukwu

== Broadcast history ==
The show premiered on 3 October 2016, on Africa Magic Urban. On 4 June 2017, Hustle began broadcasting on Africa Magic Family.

== Awards and nominations ==
Year	Award	Category	Result	Ref
2018	City People Movie Awards	Best TV Series of the Year (English)	Nominated	
2019	City People Movie Awards	Best TV Series of the Year (English)	Nominated	
