= King Invincible =

- Directed by: Femi Adesina
- Written by: Femi Adesina
- Produced by: Femi Adesina
- Starring: Omowunmi Dada, Segun Dada, Tope Tedela, Gabriel Afolayan, Bimbo Manuel, Peter Fatomilola, Jude Chukwuka.
- Release date: 2017
- Country: Nigeria
- Language: English

King Invincible is a 2017 Nigerian epic action film written and produced by Femi Adesina. Written in 2003, production started in 2015, and it was released in 2017. The film fused themes of love and war and stars Omowunmi Dada, Segun Dada, Tope Tedela, Gabriel Afolayan, Bimbo Manuel, Peter Fatomilola and Jude Chukwuka. It was supported and sponsored by LASACO Assurance, EbonyLife TV, African Magic, TVC and Channels TV.

== Synopsis ==
The film revolves around a warlord who is cursed for sinning against the gods, resulting in his gradual transformation into a wolf. His quest to find the cure becomes complicated, as he is obstructed by another powerful character.

== Cast ==
- Tope Tedela as Taari
- Gabriel Afolayan as Prince Adetiba
- Omowumi Dada as Princess Morenike
- Bimbo Manuel as Oba Adetoro
- Peter Fatomilola as Adeyeri
- Jude Chukwuka as Anikulapo
- Kola Ekun as chief
- Tunde Daniels as head guard
- Segun Sanni as guard
- Segun Dada as Kolawole
- Toyin Alausa as Olori
- Mike Abdul as Oba Adewale
- Obafemi Adisa.

== Production ==
The film was set in an ancient Yoruba kingdom.

== Awards and nominations ==
The film was nominated at the Africa Magic Viewers' Choice Awards (AMVCA) for Best Costume.
