= Honey Money (film) =

2023 Nigerian film

Honey Money is a Nollywood crime drama film released in 2023. The movie was directed by Ekene Mekwunye, produced by Vincent Okonkwo. The movie is about a school teacher Tobi get involved in internet fraud to maintain his high standards way of life. The movie features popular Nollywood characters like Timini Egbuson, Nancy Isime, Iyabo Ojo, and Junior Pope Odonwodo. The movie was released on the 23rd of April 2023.

== Synopsis ==
Tobi, a typical poor Nigerian child with exceptional qualifications, works as a poor school teacher. Despite graduating from university with excellent grades and a supposedly achievable degree, he is unable to succeed in life. The fact that Tobi's partner comes from a wealthy family exacerbates his situation. He is unable to join her in activities with her other wealthy coworkers because of their disparate backgrounds.

When Tobi meets Obi, Kaima's older brother from primary school, he sees an opportunity to turn his life around and asks Obi to "teach him how to fish." He learns from Obi that he engages in online fraud. His mother encourages him to join Obi and Kaima. Tobi picks up the skills fast, and Obi, who departs the nation, soon puts him in control of the operation. With FAC, the law enforcement agency, breathing at their necks, Tobi is left to continue the operation.

== Cast ==
- Timini Egbuson as Tobi
- Nancy Isime
- Iyabo Ojo
- Femi Branch
- Junior Pope Odonwodo as Obi
- Sandra Okunzuwa as Tobi's girlfriend
- Lina Idoko as Angelina
