= Knockout Blessing =

2018 Nigerian thriller action film

- film poster
- Directed by: Dare Olaitan
- Written by: Dare Olaitan
- Produced by: Dare Olaitan; Olufemi Ogunsanwo; Bibi Olaitan; Niyi Olaitan
- Starring: Ade Laoye; Bucci Franklin; Ademola Adedoyin; Linda Ejiofor; Meg Otanwa; Tope Tedela
- Cinematography: Kc Obiajulu
- Edited by: Seun Opabisi
- Production companies: Singularity Media; House Gabriel Studios
- Distributed by: Gensis Distribution
- Release date: 28 November 2018
- Running time: 102 minutes
- Country: Nigeria
- Language: English

Knockout Blessing is a 2018 Nigerian action thriller film directed by Dare Olaitan and co-produced by Olaitan with Olufemi Ogunsanwo, Bibi Olaitan, and Niyi Olaitan. The film stars Ade Laoye with Bucci Franklin, Ademola Adedoyin, Linda Ejiofor, Meg Otanwa and Tope Tedela in supporting roles. The film revolves around a girl, Blessing whose ambition is to achieve success of her dreams by eradicating poverty. However she unexpectedly moves to criminal underworld and gradually reaches the Nigerian political system.

The film received mostly positive critics acclaim and screened worldwide.

== Cast ==
- Ade Laoye as Blessing
- Bucci Franklin as Dagogo
- Ademola Adedoyin as Gowon
- Linda Ejiofor as Oby
- Meg Otanwa as Hannah
- Tope Tedela as Yomi
- Gbenga Titiloye as Baba
- Adideji Abimbola as Feyikewa

== Awards and nominations ==
Year	Award	Category	Result	Ref
2019	Africa Movie Academy Award	Best Actress In A Supporting Role	Nominated	,
2019	Africa Movie Academy Award	Best Nigerian Film	Nominated	,
2019	Africa Movie Academy Award	Best Visual Effects	Won	,
2019	Africa Movie Academy Award	Best Actor In A Supporting Role	Nominated	
