= Langley Kirkwood =

South African actor and triathlete (born 1973)

- Born: 14 April 1973 (age 53); England
- Occupation: Actor
- Years active: 1997–present
- Spouse: Josie Borain (2002-2012)
- Children: 2 or 3

Langley Kirkwood (born 14 April 1973) is a South African actor. He has appeared in films such as Invictus, Dredd, and Mia and the White Lion, as well as TV series, including Generation Kill in 2008 and the 2024 series White Lies. He is also a triathlete, and participated in the South African Ironman competition several times.

== Early life and education ==
Langley Kirkwood was born in England on 14 April 1973. He moved to South Africa with his parents when he was young.

He studied acting at school and went on to study drama at University of the Witwatersrand in Johannesburg.

== Career ==
He has starred in many South African as well as international TV series, including Generation Kill (2008) and the 2024 series White Lies

== Personal life ==
Kirkwood was married to South African model and photographer Josie Borain from 2002 until 2012, and had two or three children together. In 2011 they were living in Hout Bay.

Kirkwood enjoys trail running and cycling, and has participated several times in the South African Ironman competition.

== Filmography ==
=== Film ===
Year	Title	Role	Notes
1999	Pirates of the Plain	Credit Manager	
2001	Final Solution	Pieter	
2003	Citizen Verdict	Vince Turner	
2003	Consequence	Pope Agent	
2003	The Dashing Diner	Maitre'd	Short film
2003	The Bone Snatcher	Paul	
2004	Charlie	Eddy Richardson	
2004	In My Country	Boetie Malan	
2004	Berserker	Norseman	
2004	Blast	Agent Phillips	
2004	Dracula 3000	Orlock	
2004	Murmur	Billy	
2004	Dead Easy	Lloyd	
2006	Mercenary for Justice	Kreuger	
2007	Cross Line	Jones	Short film
2007	The Three Investigators and the Secret of Skeleton Island	Tom Farraday	
2008	Coronation Street: Out of Africa	Ed Teal	Direct-to-video
2009	Endgame	Jack Swart	
2009	Invictus	Presidential Guard	
2012	Dredd	Judge Lex	
2013	Death Race 3: Inferno	Dr. Klein	
2014	Son of God	King David	
2014	SEAL Team 8: Behind Enemy Lines	Lieutenant Parker	
2014	The Salvation	Man with Beard	Directed by Kristian Levring
2015	Tiger House	Sveta	Directed by Thomas Daley
2018	Mia and the White Lion	John Owen	Original title: Mia et le lion blanc
2021	The Mauritanian	Sergeant S. Sands	Thriller / War
2022	Collision	Johan Greser	Thriller
2022	Elesin Oba, The King's Horseman	Resident	Adventure / Drama / History
2025	Baby Farm		

=== Television ===
Year	Title	Role	Notes
1997	Natural Rhythm	Pedro	TV miniseries
1998	Isidingo	Gustav	TV series
1999	Die Spesenritter		TV film
2003	Für immer verloren	Ali	TV film
2003	Red Water	Brett Van Ryan	TV film
2004	King Solomon's Mines	Sergei	Miniseries; 2 episodes
2004–2007	Snitch	Bob Mailer	TV series
2005	Charlie Jade	Ren Porter	8 episodes
2005	The Triangle	Bill Granger	3 episodes
2007	Wild at Heart	Johnny	2 episodes
2007	Hard Copy	Jason Cornish	Episode: "The Measure of a Man"
2008	Generation Kill	Sgt. Steven Lovell	7 episodes
2009	The Prisoner	Fire Officer	Miniseries
2011	Strike Back	Dieter Hendricks	2 episodes
2011	Atlantis	Rusa	TV film
2011	Curiosity	Rusa	Episode: "Atlantis Uncovered"
2012	Die Jagd nach dem weißen Gold	Arno Rohwick	TV film
2012	Leonardo	Felipe Visconti	Episode: "Hitched"
2013	Banged Up Abroad	Dennis Arnoldy	Episode: "Vegas Mobster"
2013	The Bible	Elderly David	Episode: "Kingdom"
2013	Feynman and the Challenger	Avionics Engineer	TV film
2013	SAF3	Stuart	Episode: "Unknown Soldier"
2014	Black Sails	Captain Bryson	3 episodes
2014–2015	Dominion	Jeep Hanson	5 episodes
2015	Banshee	Col. Douglas Stowe	10 episodes
2017	The Catch	Theo Tasker	2 episodes
2019–2023	Warrior	Walter Buckley	30 episodes
2023–present	One Piece	Captain Morgan	2 episodes
2024	White Lies	Andrew McKenzie	Miniseries
2024	The Great War	General John Pershing	2 episodes
2024	Churchill at War	Franklin Delano Roosevelt	Miniseries
