= Titi Kuti =

Nigerian actor

- Born: Titilope Kuti; Lagos
- Citizenship: Nigerian
- Education: Lagos State University
- Occupations: Actor; Film producer; Television personality; Model
- Years active: 2005–present
- Known for: The Daily Top Ten Countdown Show; King of Boys: The Return of the King

Titi Kuti is a Nigerian actor, film producer, model, and television host, well known for his role on King of Boys: The Return of the King.

== Biography ==
Titilope Kuti was born in Lagos and grew-up around Baruwa, Ipaja Lagos, where he had his Secondary School Education in Doregos Private Academy Shagari Estate Mosan, Ipaja alongside a well known producer in the Nigerian music industry who produced songs like Why Me by D’banj (Mo-Hits Records) Ayo Faboro (Lt. Frabz)]. He is of the Ransome-Kuti family.

He graduated with a B.Sc. in Industrial Relations and Personnel Management from Lagos State University. Kuti made his first debut as a model, in 2005, while he was an undergraduate, he became the face of MTN Nigeria, and Conoil on billboards. Shortly after, he modeled for The St Moritz style awards, and Benson & Hedges, on the runway. Before venturing into the media industry, Kuti, began working with Nigezie, where he learned production and media from the VMN crew, and the managing director of Virtual Media Network, Femi Aderibigbe.

Kuti worked as Nigezie TV presenter, producer, and resource person with the channel communications department. In 2009, he became the host of The Top Ten Countdown Show on Nigezie Xtreme (formally Nigezie TV), a music countdown show which he later served as the producer of The Top Ten Countdown Show. In 2010, he filmed his first TV series titled Emerald. In 2018, he played a minor role as Ade Tiger, on Netflix Original King of Boys, and returned back on screen in 2021, with a major role on the Netflix Original series King of Boys: The Return of the King. On 7 December 2021, he covered The Will Downtown Magazine's issue 43, volume 1. In January 2022, Stakers Championship reality TV show, unveiled Kuti, as one of its co-hosts, alongside Uti Nwachukwu, and Liquorose.

He has produced several Television shows, and movies; including, Glo Naija Sings, Nigerian Idol, Nigeria's Got Talent (seasons 1 and 2), Football legends Nigeria and Tecno Own The Stage, reality show. Kuti transitioned from a model into a film producer and debuted his first production for M-Net television series Hustle, which he successfully produced its 3 seasons, for Africa Magic from 2016 to 2018 and later joined Smart Media Production as an associate producer for a reality show Looking for Love Naija in 2018.

== Filmography ==
List of filmographies by Titi Kuti.

Year	Film	Role	Notes
2018	King of Boys	Ade Tiger	Drama
2018	Power of 1	Award Presenter	Drama
2021	King of Boys: The Return of the King	Ade Tiger	Drama
2022	Flawsome		TV Series
2024	Anikulapo: Rise of the Spectre	Adigun	Drama

=== Television ===
Year	Show	Role	Notes
2009	The Top Ten Countdown Show	Host	Nigezie TV
	Glo Naija Sings	Producer	
	Nigerian Idol	Producer	
2012-13	Nigeria's Got Talent (seasons 1 and 2)	Producer	
	Football legends Nigeria	Producer	
	Tecno Own The Stage	Producer	
2018	Looking for Love Naija	Associate producer	
2022	Stakers Championship	Co-host	TBA
2022	Flawsome	Poju	Drama

=== Other productions ===
Year	Film	Role
2010	Emerald	Producer
2016-18	Hustle	Producer

== See also ==
- List of Nigerian actors
- List of Nigerian film producers
