= The Herd (2025 film) =

2025 Nigerian film

- Directed by: Daniel Etim-Effiong
- Starring: Daniel Etim-Effiong; Kunle Remi; Genoveva Umeh; Deyemi Okanlawon; Linda Ejiofor
- Release date: 2025
- Country: Nigeria
- Languages: English, Yoruba, Igbo, Hausa, Nigerian pidgin

The Herd is a 2025 Nigerian crime thriller directed by Daniel Etim Effiong and co-produced by FilmOne Studios, ToriTori Films, Serendipity HHC, and Airscape. The film marks Effiong's directorial debut. It was released theatrically on 17 October 2025 and stars Daniel Etim Effiong, Kunle Remi, Genoveva Umeh, Deyemi Okanlawon, Linda Ejiofor, Mercy Aigbe, Adam Garba, Abba Ali Zaky, and Norbert Young. The film revolves around kidnapping by herdsmen and it generated reactions and grievances from the Arewa community, emphasizing that it creates a stereotype against the Muslim community. Director Etim-Effiong has described the film as a personal and professional milestone for him.

== Plot summary ==
The Herd opens with a happy day, the wedding of Fola and Derin. After the wedding party, they were headed home, driven by Gosi, Fola's best friend, when they were attacked by kidnappers disguised as herders. The groom was murdered on the spot while he attempted to run away, leaving his newlywed wife, Gosi and other victims. The kidnapping caused a strong fight for survival among the victims, while different levels of betrayal were also displayed among the kidnappers leading to violence and compromise.

== Cast ==
- Daniel Etim-Effiong as Gosi
- Kunle Remi as Fola
- Genoveva Umeh as Derin
- Mercy Aigbe as Derin's mother
- Deyemi Okanlawon
- Linda Ejiofor as Adama
- Sulaiman Ladani as Yakubu
- Adam Garba
- Abba Ali Zaky as Halil
- Amal Umar as Habiba
- Jaiye Kuti as Fola’s mother

== Production and release ==
The film which was released theatrically on 17 October 2025, made ₦30.1 million in the opening weekend.
