= Farmer's Bride =

2024 Nigerian film

- Directed by: Adebayo Tijani
- Written by: Jackenneth Opukeme
- Story by: Jackenneth Opukeme
- Produced by: Filmone
- Starring: Tobi Bakre; Femi Branch; Gbubemi Ejeye; Tobi Bakre; Mercy Aigbe; Wumi Toriola
- Distributed by: FilmOne Distribution
- Release date: 27 September 2024
- Country: Nigeria

Farmer's Bride is a 2024 period drama produced by Filmone studios and released to cinemas nationwide on 27 September 2024. The film set in the 1980s features in lead characters - Tobi Bakre, Femi Branch, Gbubemi Ejeye, Mercy Aigbe, Efe Irele, Wumi Toriola.

== Synopsis ==
Farmer's Bride tells the story of Odun (played by Femi Branch) who is a rich and successful farmer in the 1980s, pushed by his loneliness as he had no wife, resorted to marrying a young bride, Funmi (played by Gbubemi Ejeye), the union which didn't excite Funmi soon led to a lot of struggle as Funmi struggles to find peace in the union as her heart wasn't in the said marriage. Driven by her quest to find happiness, Funmi soon embarks on a secret affair with Odun's nephew (played by Tobi Bakre), the affair led to a more complex situation of love, betrayal and the supernatural.

== Selected cast ==
- Femi Branch as Odun
- Gbubemi Ejeye as Funmi
- Tobi Bakre
- Mercy Aigbe
- Wumi Toriola
- Efe Irele

== Production and release ==
Following the release of Farmer's Bride to cinemas on 27th, September of 2024, the film breaks record as the highest grossing Filmone original movie. The film also boast of presence in all francophone countries in Africa including Senegal, Benin Republic, Togo, Burkina Faso, and Congo.
