= A Soldier's Story (2015 film) =

2015 Nigerian action drama film

- Directed by: Frankie Ogar
- Screenplay by: Frankie Ogar
- Produced by: Martin Gbados
- Starring: Tope Tedela; Linda Ejiofor; Daniel K Daniel; Adesua Etomi
- Cinematography: Frankie Ogar
- Edited by: Frankie Ogar
- Production company: Frankie Ogar Films
- Distributed by: Genesis Deluxe Cinemas
- Release date: September 2015
- Running time: 113 minutes
- Country: Nigeria

A Soldier's Story is a 2015 Nigerian action drama film directed by Frankie Ogar. It had Tope Tedela, Linda Ejiofor and Daniel K Daniel in lead roles. For his role as "Bossman", Daniel K Daniel won AMAA and AMVCA awards.

== Plot ==
The opening scene starts with soldiers in a war torn city of a country neighbouring Nigeria. A bomb blows up after some rebels attack the soldiers.

Major Egan (Tope Tedela) sneaks out of his matrimonial bed to dress up for a military mission. Unbeknownst to him, his wife, Lebari (Adesua Etomi) is awake. He has a confrontational session and later intervention with Col. Bello (Chukwuma Aligwekwe), a godfather to Lebari and his instructor.

In a rebel camp, Bossman (Daniel K Daniel) kills two of his men for what he perceives is a "rat-like' behavior. During a search for abandoned useful materials, Regina and Angela finds a seemingly dead soldier move. Regina resorts to taking him to her house for further examination to the distaste of Angela. After some weeks of treatment and gaining consciousness, the soldier is revealed to be Major Egan but now suffering from amnesia. Bossman threatens to make Regina's brother as one of his fighters if Regina continues to advise him to change his ways. Regina and Major Egan become closer, making Angela jealous. After a fight duel with Bossman, Major Egan recollects all the events from his previous life. After the realization that he was married, Major Egan leaves Regina for Nigeria. On arriving Lagos, he discovers his former residence is being occupied by some other persons. Afterwards, he is taken by some colleagues to Col. Bello's office, who told him that his wife was away in Abuja for a job interview. It was later revealed that Col. Bello was responsible for his proposed death on military assignment because of his intention to marry Lebari.

Angela seeks forgiveness from Regina after the revelation that she disclosed information to Bossman due to the pain she felt when Major Egan rejected her advances. She advises Regina to go to Nigeria to meet Major Egan if she's truly in love with him. In Nigeria, Col. Bello sends soldiers to assassinate Major Egan and make it appear as suicide. A gas cylinder was opened by the assassinator who revealed the death wish of Major Egan and told him Col. Bello was responsible. As the sergeant was leaving the house, stating on phone, "I have sent him to hell this time" with a bomb timer in his hands, Regina surfaces to save Major Egan for the second time saying, "Why do you always get yourself into death situations?"

== Cast ==
- Linda Ejiofor as Regina
- Tope Tedela as Major Egan
- Daniel K Daniel as Bossman
- Adesua Etomi as Lebari
- Zainab Balogun as Angela
- Chukwuma Aligwekwe as Col. Bello
- Sambasa Nzeribe as Ghetto
- Olumide Oworu as Edwin

== Release ==
It premiered at Genesis Cinemas, Onikan, Lagos State in September 2015.

== Reception ==
36onobs.com explained in its review that the director wasted an interesting story-line on a weak screenplay. It went further to conclude that "It is difficult to equate the dissatisfaction that one feels when one sees an otherwise captivating story that ends up not realizing its potential in any art form, but this discontentment is aggravated when a motion picture director fails to make his art picturesque."

== Awards ==
Award	Category	Recipient	Result	Ref
12th Africa Movie Academy Awards	Africa Movie Academy Award for Best Actor	Daniel K Daniel	Won	
12th Africa Movie Academy Awards	Africa Movie Academy Award for Best Makeup		Won	
12th Africa Movie Academy Awards	Africa Movie Academy Award for Best Costume Design		Nominated	
12th Africa Movie Academy Awards	Africa Movie Academy Award for Best Production Design		Nominated	
12th Africa Movie Academy Awards	Africa Movie Academy Award for Best Visual Effects		Nominated	
2016 Africa Magic Viewers Choice Awards	Best Actor in a Lead role	Daniel K Daniel	Won	
2016 Africa Magic Viewers Choice Awards	Best Supporting Actor in a drama	Sambassa Nzeribe	Won	
2016 Africa Magic Viewers Choice Awards	Best Supporting Actor in a drama	Olumide Oworu	Nominated	
2016 Africa Magic Viewers Choice Awards	Best Picture Editor	Olumide Oworu	Nominated	
2018 Zulu African Film Academy Awards	Best Screen Play		Won	
