= Toolz =

Nigerian radio presenter (born 1982)

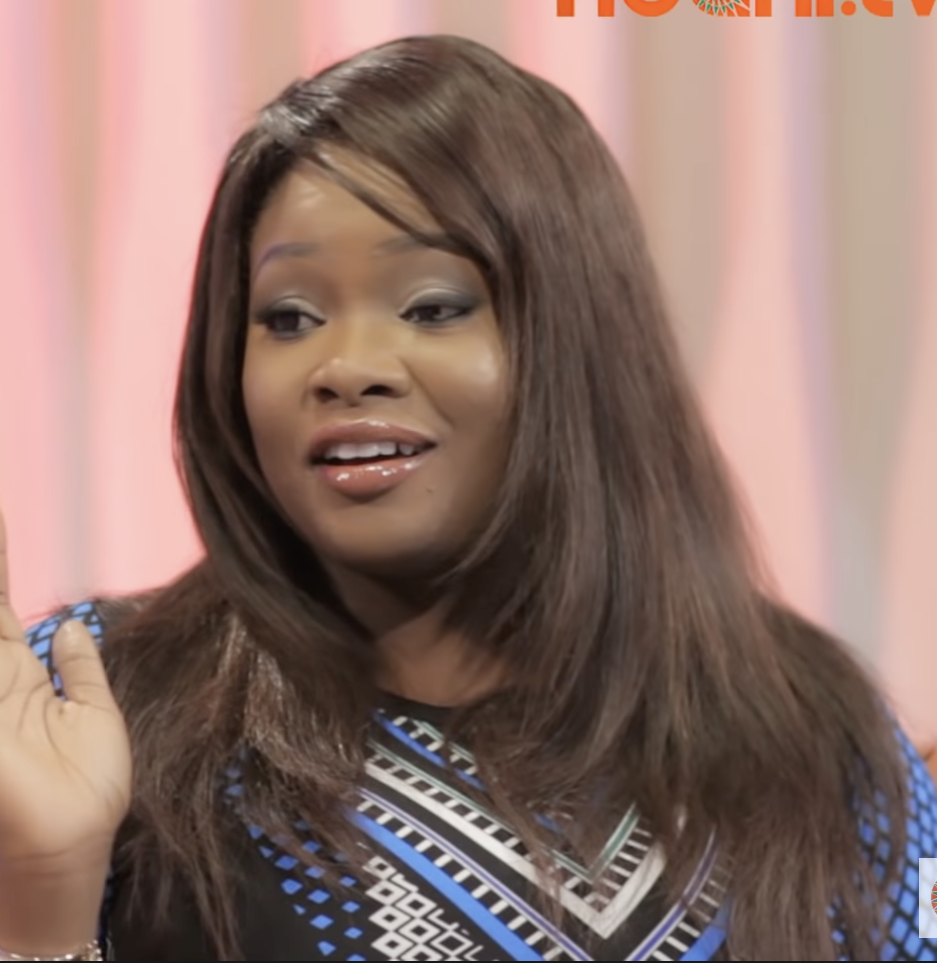
- Born: Tolu Oniru; 6 July 1982 (age 43)
- Citizenship: Nigerian
- Occupations: Media personality, Talk show host

Tolu Oniru (born 6 July 1982), popularly known as Toolz, is a Nigerian radio personality, talk show host, and presenter. She hosts The Midday Show on The Beat 99.9 FM. Toolz aka Tolu Oniru-Demuren became the acting Program Director of The Beat 99.9 FM in 2020.

== Early life ==
Toolz was born in London on 6 July 1982. She had her primary education at Talbot House preparatory school in Bournemouth, UK, and secondary education in Nigeria before relocating to study at City of Westminster College. She also has a degree in Business and Mass communication from London Metropolitan University. Her parents are members of the Oniru royal family of Lagos State.

== Personal life ==
Tolu Oniru married Tunde Demuren, son of a former Director General of National Civil Aviation Authority, Harold Demuren in Dubai on 26 May 2016. They have two children together.

In an interview with Potpourri, she talks about how she got into radio presenting and how it happened accidentally. Subsequently after getting the job, she was not sure she was good enough, as that was her first radio gig. She was certain she would be fired in three months; which that didn't happen. She described her career was initially on a ‘plan-as-I-go’ basis, but now she tries to plan more and set more long-term goals.

== Career ==
Prior to settling in Nigeria in 2008, she worked with MTV Europe and Walt Disney Pictures in the United Kingdom. She presently hosts The Midday Show on The Beat 99.9 FM every weekday. She also interviews popularly African entertainers on her talk show The Juice. Popular celebrities like Yvonne Nelson, Omotola Jalade Ekeinde, Davido, Rita Dominic have all been on her show. She was part of the judges at the 2011 and 2012 Channel O Music Video Awards. In 2013 Toolz was the host of X Factor West Africa

Olisa Adibua was the director of programs at The Beat 99.9 FM until 2019. In 2020 Toolz aka Tolu Oniru-Demuren became the acting Program Director.

== Awards ==
=== Won ===
- 2010 Nigeria Broadcasters Awards - Radio Presenter of the Year
- 2010 Dynamix All Youths Awards - Radio Presenter of the Year
- 2011 FAB Awards - On-Air Personality of the Year
- 2011 Nigeria Broadcasters Awards - Sexiest Media Personality
- 2012 The Future Awards - On-Air Personality of the Year
- 2012 Nigeria Entertainment Awards - Media Personality of the Year

=== Nominated ===
- 2014 Nickelodeon Kids' Choice Awards - Favourite Nigerian On Air Personality
