= All the Colours of the World Are Between Black and White =

2023 Nigerian drama film

- Official poster
- Directed by: Babatunde Apalowo
- Screenplay by: Babatunde Apalowo
- Produced by: Damilola E. Orimogunje; Imafidon Gift Jesurobo-Owie; David Wyte; Nkechi Okere
- Starring: Tope Tedela; Riyo David; Martha Ehinome Orhiere; Uchechika Elumelu
- Cinematography: David Wyte
- Edited by: Babatunde Apalowo
- Music by: Richard Kett; Catherine Shrubshall
- Production companies: Polymath Pictures; 2o9ine Films; Creative Black Productions; Realm 360 Productions
- Distributed by: Coccinelle Sales
- Release date: 17 February 2023 (Berlinale)
- Running time: 93 minutes
- Country: Nigeria
- Languages: English; Igbo

All the Colours of the World Are Between Black and White is a 2023 Nigerian romantic drama film written and directed by Babatunde Apalowo in his directorial debut. The film stars Tope Tedela, Riyo David, Martha Ehinome Orhiere and Uchechika Elumelu. It was shown in the Panorama section at the 73rd Berlin International Film Festival, where it had its world premiere on February 17, 2023 and won the Teddy Award for best LGBTQ-themed feature film.

== Plot ==
The film follows two men named Bambino and Bawa who meet in Lagos during a photography competition and get friendly. Exploring the city they develop a strong affection for each other. But, due to societal norms about homosexuality, they are uncomfortable to express.

== Cast ==
- Tope Tedela as Bambino
- Riyo David as Bawa
- Martha Ehinome Orhiere as Ifeyinwa
- Uchechika Elumelu as Mama
- Floyd Anekwe as Boss

== Development ==
The film is written and directed by Babatunde Apalowo in his directorial debut. Apalowo initially conceptualized the film as a hommage to the city of Lagos, where the film is set. The film director considers Lagos to be a character of the film that influences the actions of the other characters. He stated: "Lagos is a city that is full of life and energy, but it can also be dangerous and unpredictable." While studying at university, a friend of the director was, in front of him, lynched by a mob because of his sexual orientation, which initiated him to do a film with LGBT themes. The film is produced by Damilola Orimogunje.

Apalowo said that the main challenge during the production was to find the right cast. Many male actors of Nollywood turned down the main roles in fear of the effects this might have on their career due to the dangerous situation of LGBT people in Nigeria. Tope Tedela and Riyo David as main lead, and Martha Ehinome Orhiere, Uchechika Elumelu and Floyd Anekwe were cast to play supporting roles.

== Analysis ==
In a statement on the themes and relevance, Apalowo stated, "The main theme of the film is love, as it is a love story between two people, despite their sexual identities. The film is a reflection on love, identity, acceptance, and the complexities of navigating life as an outsider in a society that often rejects those who are different."

Visually, the film focuses on shots of the faces of the three main characters Bambino, Bawa and Ifeyinwa. Apalowo did this in order to create a sense of intimacy between the characters and the audience, so the audience could relate better to the characters. The cinematography has shots almost only at a human eye level in order to evoke realism.

== Release ==
All the Colours of the World Are Between Black and White had its premiere on 17 February 2023 as part of the 73rd Berlin International Film Festival, in Panorama. Michael Stütz, director of Panorama, especially cited the visual concept of the film as well as the political relevance of the film as reasons for including the film in the section.

It was reported on 14 February 2023 that Italy-based Coccinelle Film Sales has acquired world rights of the film.

== Reception ==
=== Critical response ===
Julian Janssen of ObviouslyReviews wrote of the directing as full of visual flair, reminiscent of the works of masters of cinema Wong Kar-wai and Barry Jenkins. He wrote that Apalowo's greatest achievement with the film is his ability to establish connections between characters and depict certain moods through his imagery.

Nigerian film critic Jerry Chiemeke compliments that the film breaks away from stereotypes surrounding queer characters in Nigerian cinema by focusing on the tenderness of the two male characters. However, he criticised that the film "still paints homosexuality as an 'unnatural feeling' that has to be battled with. It could be argued that given the uber-religious nature of Nigeria, it's not out of place for queer people to feel like they have a 'demon' that they need to be delivered from, but should we still be running with tropes like this? Did Bawa have to weaponise the country's homophobia to get back at Bambino because he felt scorned?"

Lida Bach of Movie Break rated the film 6.5 stars out of 10, praised the performances and direction writing, "With formal reduction and convincing performers, Babatunde Apalowo makes the inner struggle tangible". Talking about the setting, which, as per her, is similar to the characters split between modernism and reactionism, Bach opined that "their character development anchors a story between a plea for tolerance and a psychological parable that overcomes their minimal resources.

Matthew Joseph Jenner of ICS wrote: "Apalowo immediately announces himself as a major new talent in contemporary African cinema, an essential voice that brings not only a powerful directorial vision (with the vibrant colours and strong aesthetic perspective instantly emphasizing his prowess), but also his skill as a storyteller" and of Tedela's performance, he wrote: "with his silent moments of reflection being beautifully portrayed by Tope Tedela, whose performance is very quiet and internal, but simmers with an understated complexity that only grows as the film continues to explore his voyage of self-examination, portraying his efforts to feel less lost and isolated in a rapidly changing world, although one in which his identity is still a source of considerable contention amongst those who are more aligned with traditional values".

=== Accolades ===
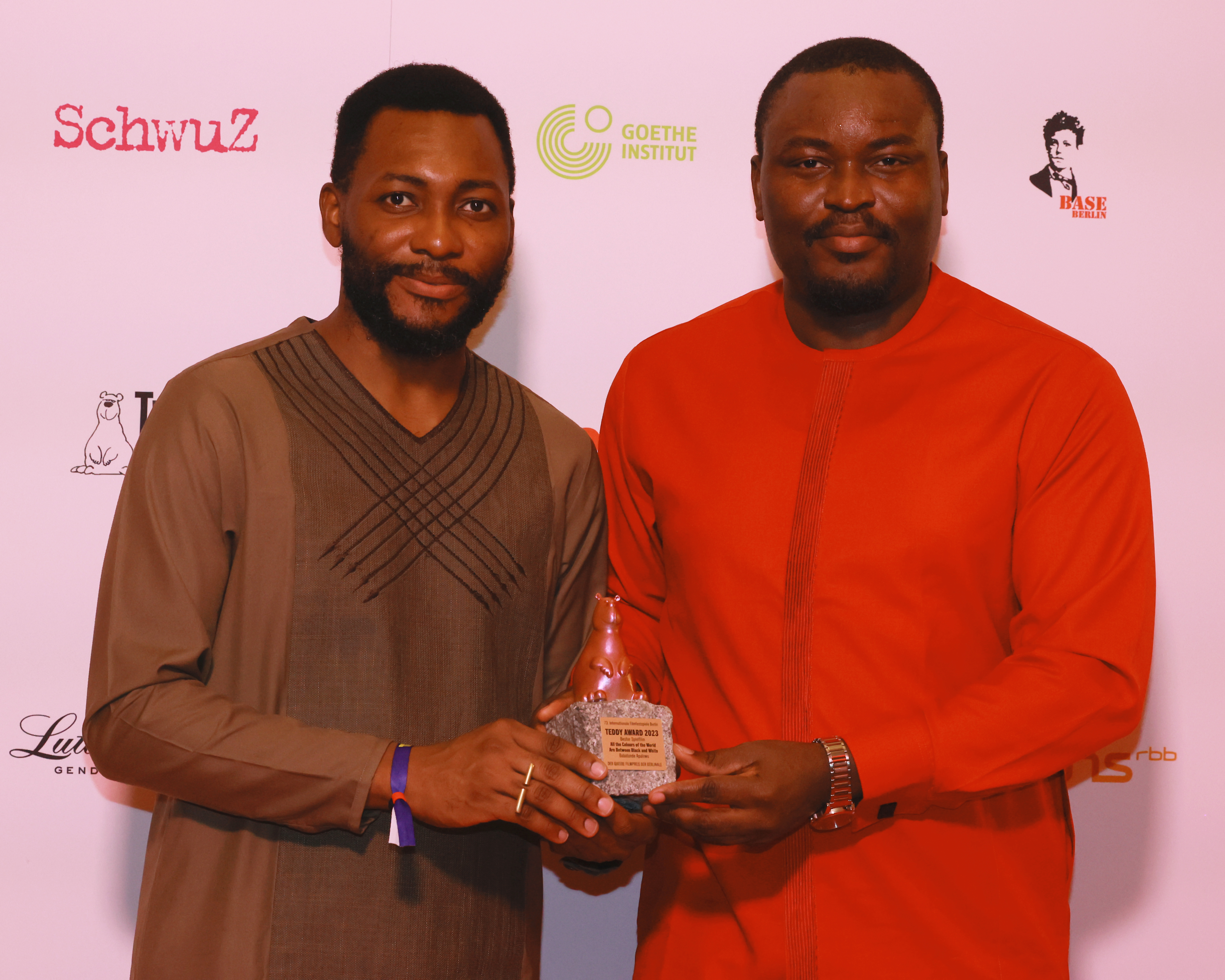
Babatunde Apalowo and Tope Tedela, with the Teddy Award for All the Colours of the World Are Between Black and White

Award	Date	Category	Recipient	Result	Ref.
Berlin International Film Festival	25 February 2023	Panorama Audience Award for Best Feature Film	All the Colours of the World Are Between Black and White	Nominated	
Berlin International Film Festival	25 February 2023	GWFF Best First Feature Award	Babatunde Apalowo	Nominated	
Berlin International Film Festival	25 February 2023	Teddy Award for Best Feature Film	All the Colours of the World Are Between Black and White	Won	
Africa Magic Viewers' Choice Awards	20 May 2023	Best Actor In A Drama, Movie Or TV Series	Tope Tedela	Nominated	
Africa Magic Viewers' Choice Awards	20 May 2023	Best Director	Babatunde Apalowo	Nominated	
Frameline		Out in Silence	Babatunde Apalowo	Won	
Out on Film, Atlanta		Best Director	Babatunde Apalowo	Won	
Seattle International Film Festival		New Director Competitions	Babatunde Apalowo	Nominated	
Raindance		Best Cinematography	David Wyte	Won	
LesGaiCineMad		Best Director	Babatunde Apalowo	Won	
Africa International Film Festival		Special Jury Prize	All The Colours Of The World Are Between Black and White	Won	
Merlinka Festival		Best Feature Film	All The Colours Of The World Are Between Black and White	Nominated	
Cinema Jove		Best Music	Richard Kett Catharine Shrubshall	Won	
