= Ada the Country =

- Book: Titilope Sonuga
- Premiere: 2 January 2020: MUSON Centre, Onikan, Lagos
- Productions: 2020 Lagos 2022 Lagos 2022 Abuja

Ada the Country is a 2020 Nigerian musical written by Titilope Sonuga and produced by Marian Ogaziechi under the theatrical studio of Doyenne Circle Productions. The play stars Nollywood actresses Patience Ozokwor, Joke Silva and Bikiya Graham Douglas.

== Development ==
Although in the works for about ten years, the show was written in 2019.

== Synopsis ==
Ada, a young woman, is involved in a fire accident which destroys her property and kills her 9 month old daughter, Chiamaka. At the time, her husband Femi was away from home, only returning when the fire has ravaged their home. In the aftermath of the incident Ada becomes depressed. She leaves her husband to return to her parents' home, where family members accuse her of being insensitive and inhumane for leaving Femi. She speaks to the other women in her family, including her divorced sister, a single mother, and a working class woman struggling with sexism at work. Through sharing their experience of living as women in Nigeria, Ada is able to find some healing and reconcile with her husband.

== Productions ==
The show debuted in January 2020.

The show was performed at MUSON Centre, Onikan, Lagos from April 15 to 18, 2022. The show was directed by Kemi Lala-Akindoju.

In October 2022 Doyenne Circle brought the show to Abuja, where it was performed at the Musa Yaradua Centre on 21 and 22 October. This staging was directed by Kenneth Uphopho.

== Cast ==
	2020 Doyenne Circle	2022 Doyenne Circle
Ada	Kate Henshaw	
Ada's mother	Patience Ozokwor	
Femi's mother	Joke Silva	
		Bikiya Graham Douglas
Nkem	Chioma 'Chigul' Omeruah	
Ifeoma	Oluchi Odii	
Kemi	Lala Akindoju	Tosin Adeyemi
		Imoh Eboh
Femi	Ayo Ayoola	
Alero	Bimbo Akintola	
Funmi	Ade Laoye	
Lola	Oludara Egerton-Shygnle	
