= Baby Farm (TV series) =

- Written by: Darrel Bristow-Bovey
- Directed by: Walter Taylaur; Kayode Kasum
- Country of origin: Nigeria

Production
- Producer: Mo Abudu
- Production company: EbonyLife TV

Baby Farm is a Nigerian limited television series directed by Walter Taylaur and Kayode Kasum and produced by Mo Abudu. It was released on Netflix on 21 March 2025.

== Plot ==
Set in Lagos, the series explores the reality of baby farming. A seemingly benevolent NGO run by the charismatic Dr. Oliver Evans and his wife, Sister Barb, exploits vulnerable pregnant women for profit. The story centres on Adanna, a young pregnant woman from a rural community who is lured into the facility with promises of care, only to find herself trapped. Meanwhile, Cherise, a famous actress struggling with infertility, becomes unknowingly entangled with the foundation's illegal activities. As investigative journalist Joy and outsider Ifeyinwa work to expose the truth, their lives intersect in a high-stakes battle for survival, trust, and justice.

== Cast ==
- Langley Kirkwood
- Jenny Stead
- Tope Tedela
- Joseph Benjamin
- Genoveva Umeh
- Rita Dominic
- Folu Storms
- Onyinye Odokoro
