= Eric Aghimien =

Nigerian director

- Born: Eric Enomamien Aghimien; January 21, 1982 (age 44); Benin City, Edo, Nigeria
- Citizenship: Nigerian
- Education: Auchi Polytechnic, Auchi, Nigeria
- Occupations: Director, Screenwriter, Editor, Producer
- Known for: A Mile from Home

Eric Enomamien Aghimien is a Nigerian director, producer, screenwriter and editor. His debut feature film, A Mile from Home won awards at both the 2014 Africa Magic Viewers Choice Awards and the 10th Africa Movie Academy Awards.

== Early life ==
Eric Aghimien was born in Benin City, Edo State and is the fourth of seven children. At the age of eight while he was in primary school, he began drawing comics and selling some to fellow students. He attended Immaculate Conception College, Benin City and Auchi Polytechnic, Edo State, Nigeria. Eric is naturally gifted with creative artistic abilities which include; singing, moulding and drawing. His greatest hobby since childhood is watching movies beside swimming and football.

He obtained a National Diploma in Science Laboratory Technology in 2005. While obtaining his diploma, he was a member of a musical group called Da TED. After his National Diploma, Eric decided to pursue a career in entertainment.

== Career ==
In 2006, Aghimien moved to Lagos from Benin and decided to pursue a career in film. He began his film career in 2007 at a computer training institute where he learnt how to use computers, graphic design and video editing. Eric wanted to study filmmaking abroad but could not raise enough funds to see it through. He continued his learning by sourcing tutorials online. Eric founded Hills Pictures Movie Academy in 2008 which helps upcoming talents discover, develop and exhibit their talents.

In 2011, he made an experimental short film titled Heckto which was nominated for Best Use of Special Effects and Best Actor at the 2012 International Short Film Festival. Aghimien also made his first feature film A Mile from Home, an action drama, which received positive reviews.

== Filmography ==
Year	Film	Role
2011	Heckto (Short)	Writer, director
2013	A Mile from Home	Writer, producer, director
2014	Leeway (Short)	Writer, director
2016	Slow Country	Writer, producer, director

== Awards and nominations ==
Year	Award	Category	Work	Result
2013	Blueprint Awards	Movie Producer of the Year	A Mile from Home	Won
2014	Africa Magic Viewers' Choice Awards	Best Lighting Designer	A Mile from Home	Nominated
2014	Africa Movie Academy Awards	Achievement In Visual Effects	A Mile from Home	Won
2014	Africa Movie Academy Awards	Achievement In Make-Up	A Mile from Home	Nominated
2014	Best of Nollywood Awards	Best Director	A Mile from Home	Nominated
2014	Best of Nollywood Awards	Best Edited Movie	A Mile from Home	Won
2014	Best of Nollywood Awards	Best Movie	A Mile from Home	Nominated
2014	Best of Nollywood Awards	Best Screenplay	A Mile from Home	Nominated
2014	Best of Nollywood Awards	Movie with the Best Special Effects	A Mile from Home	Won
2014	Golden Icons Academy Movie Awards	Best Director	A Mile from Home	Won
2014	Golden Icons Academy Movie Awards	Producer of the Year	A Mile from Home	Nominated
2014	Golden Icons Academy Movie Awards	Best Edited Film	A Mile from Home	Nominated
2014	Golden Icons Academy Movie Awards	Best Cinematography	A Mile from Home	Nominated
2014	Golden Icons Academy Movie Awards	Best Motion Picture	A Mile from Home	Nominated
2014	Golden Icons Academy Movie Awards	Best Drama	A Mile from Home	Won
2014	Nollywood Movies Awards	Best Director	A Mile from Home	Nominated
2014	Nollywood Movies Awards	Best Movie	A Mile from Home	Won
2014	Nollywood Movies Awards	Best Cinematography	A Mile from Home	Nominated
2014	Nollywood Movies Awards	Best Original Screenplay	A Mile from Home	Nominated
2014	Nollywood Movies Awards	Best Set Design	A Mile from Home	Nominated
2014	The Africa Film Festival and Academy Awards (ZAFAA)	Best Producer	A Mile from Home	Nominated
2014	The Africa Film Festival and Academy Awards (ZAFAA)	Best Editor	A Mile from Home	Won

== See also ==
- List of Nigerian film producers
