= Kemi Lala Akindoju =

Nigerian actress

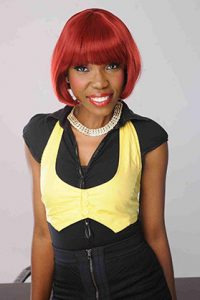
- Born: Kemi Akindoju; 8 March 1986 (age 40); Lagos State, Nigeria
- Citizenship: Nigeria
- Education: University of Lagos; Pan African University
- Occupation: Actress
- Years active: 2005–present
- Notable work: Suru L'ere
- Spouse: Chef Fregz (m. 2018–present)
- Children: 1
- Awards: AMVCA Trailblazer Award

Kemi "Lala" Akindoju is a Nigerian actress. She won an Africa Magic trailblazer award for her role in the film adaptation of Dazzling Mirage.

== Personal life ==
Akindoju was born on 8 March 1987 in a family of four children. She is a native of Ondo State. She had her secondary education at Queens College, Lagos. After obtaining her West African Examinations Council examination, she proceeded to study insurance at University of Lagos. She also received a master's degree from Pan-Atlantic University, studying media and communication. She married Chef Fregz in September 2018 and had a son in February 2021.

== Career ==
She started her acting career in 2005 from stage performance before venturing into feature films.

== Filmography ==
- Alan Poza (2013) as Ina (with OC Ukeje)
- Dazzling Mirage (2014) as Funmiwo
- The CEO (2016) as Lisa
- Fifty (2015) as Chike
- Suru L'ere (2016) as Landlady
- Potato Potahto (2017) as Frances
- Ajuwaya (2017) as Yewande
- Lara and the Beat (2018) as Tonye
- Òlòtūré (2019) as Blessing
- Your Excellency (2019) as Lina
- The Smart Money Woman (2020) as Adesuwa
- Lizard (2020) as Patience
- Ada the Country (2020)
- Rise (2022) as Joy

=== Production/Direction credits ===
- Gangs of Lagos (2023) - Co-produced with Jáde Osiberu
- The Black Book (2023) - Produced
- Ada the Country (2020) - Directed

== Awards and nominations ==
- The Future Awards - 2010 Actor of the year.
- 11th Africa Movie Academy Awards - Most Promising Actor
