= A Mile from Home =

2013 film by Eric Aghimien

A Mile From Home
- Directed by: Eric Aghimien
- Story by: Eric Aghimien
- Produced by: Eric Aghimien
- Starring: Tope Tedela; Chiedozie 'Sambasa' Nzeribe; Alex Ayalogu; Eric Nwanso; Tolu Akinbileje
- Music by: Vincent 'VNC' Umukoro; Joshua Ekene
- Production company: Hills Pictures
- Release date: 13 June 2013
- Country: Nigeria
- Language: English

A Mile from Home is a 2013 Nigerian action-drama film written, produced and directed by Eric Aghimien, starring Tope Tedela, Chiedozie Sambasa Nzeribe, Alex Ayalogu, Eric Nwanso and Tolu Akinbileje. Tedela portrays Lala, a university student with an identity crisis who joins a notorious gang to get revenge. The film was nominated in two categories at the 2nd Africa Magic Viewers' Choice Awards and won best actor in a drama for Tedela. The movie won the 2014 Africa Movie Academy Award for Achievement in Visual Effect.

== Plot ==
A Mile from Home chronicles the life of a university student, Jude Odaro (Tope Tedela) who joins a gang in his quest to avenge an injustice meted out to him by Stone, a notorious gangster who forcefully dispossesses him of a precious possession.

Suku (Chiedozie Nzeribe), the Leader of the gang loves him and makes him the number two man in the gang. Suku introduced him into crime and trusts him with everything he has and controls. Jude gets more committed to the gang and earns a new name, Lala. Jude finally yields to his feelings for, Ivie, Suku's girlfriend and he is willing to die loving her.

Don Kolo, who was convicted for drug dealing gets out of jail and is deported from South Africa. He is broke and desperately wants to start his drug business at home. He needs supplies but has no money. Suku and his men get a big supply from their contact Chief Lukas and Don Kolo will do anything to take it from them.

== Cast ==
- Tope Tedela as Lala
- Chiedozie 'Sambasa' Nzeribe as Suku
- Alex Ayalogu as Don Kolo
- Tolu Akinbileje as Ivie
- Eric Nwanso as Deba

== Awards and nominations ==
Award	Category	Recipient	Result
Africa Magic Viewers Choice Awards	Best Actor in a Drama	Tope Tedela	Won
Africa Magic Viewers Choice Awards	Best Lighting Designer	Eric Aghimien	Nominated
Africa Movie Academy Awards	Achievement in visual Effects	Eric Aghimien	Won
Africa Movie Academy Awards	Achievement in Make-Up		Nominated
Africa Movie Academy Awards	Best Young/Promising Actor	Tope Tedela	Nominated
Best of Nollywood Awards	Best Movie	Eric Aghimien	Nominated
Best of Nollywood Awards	Best Actor in a Leading Role	Tope Tedela	Won
Best of Nollywood Awards	Best Director	Eric Aghimien	Nominated
Best of Nollywood Awards	Best Edited Movie	Eric Aghimien	Won
Best of Nollywood Awards	Best Supporting Actor	Chiedozie 'Sambasa' Nzeribe	Nominated
Best of Nollywood Awards	Revelation of the Year	Tope Tedela	Nominated
Best of Nollywood Awards	Best Screenplay	Eric Aghimien	Nominated
Best of Nollywood Awards	Best Special Effects	Eric Aghimien	Won
Golden Icons Academy Movie Awards	Best Drama Film	Eric Aghimien	Won
Golden Icons Academy Movie Awards	Best Director	Eric Aghimien	Won
Golden Icons Academy Movie Awards	Best Motion Picture	Eric Aghimien	Nominated
Golden Icons Academy Movie Awards	Most Promising Actor	Tope Tedela	Won
Golden Icons Academy Movie Awards	Best On-Screen Duo	Tope Tedela & Chiedozie 'Sambasa' Nzeribe	Nominated
Golden Icons Academy Movie Awards	Best Producer	Eric Aghimien	Nominated
Golden Icons Academy Movie Awards	Best Edited Film	Eric Aghimien	Nominated
Golden Icons Academy Movie Awards	Best Make-Up		Nominated
Golden Icons Academy Movie Awards	Best Cinematography	Eric Aghimien	Nominated
Golden Icons Academy Movie Awards	Best Sound	Vincent 'VNC' Umukoro & Joshua Ekine	Won
Nigeria Entertainment Awards	Best Actor	Tope Tedela	Won
Nollywood Movies Awards	Best Movie	Eric Aghimien	Won
Nollywood Movies Awards	Best Director	Eric Aghimien	Nominated
Nollywood Movies Awards	Best Cinematography	Eric Aghimien	Nominated
Nollywood Movies Awards	Best Lead Male	Tope Tedela	Nominated
Nollywood Movies Awards	Best Costume Design	Godwin Aghimien	Nominated
Nollywood Movies Awards	Best Rising Star	Tope Tedela	Won
Nollywood Movies Awards	Best Makeup		Nominated
Nollywood Movies Awards	Best Original Screenplay	Eric Aghimien	Nominated
Nollywood Movies Awards	Best Set Design	Biodun Olagbaju & Eric Aghimien	Nominated
Nollywood Movies Awards	Best Soundtrack	Vincent 'VNC' Umukoro	Nominated

== See also ==
- List of Nigerian films of 2013
