= Ojukokoro =

2016 Nigerian crime-heist comedy film

Ojukokoro: Greed
- Directed by: Dare Olaitan
- Screenplay by: Dare Olaitan
- Produced by: Olufemi D. Ogunsanwo; Dare Olaitan
- Starring: Wale Ojo; Tope Tedela; Charles Etubiebi; Seun Ajayi; Ali Nuhu; Shawn Faqua; Somkele Iyamah; Emmanuel Ikubese
- Cinematography: Baba Agba
- Edited by: Seun Opabisi
- Production companies: Singularity Media; House Gabriel Studios; BCI Studios
- Distributed by: FilmOne Distributions
- Release dates: 17 November 2016 (AFRIFF); 17 March 2017 (Nigeria)
- Running time: 110 minutes
- Country: Nigeria
- Languages: English; Yoruba; Bini

Ojukokoro: Greed, also known simply as Ojukokoro, is a 2016 Nigerian crime-heist comedy film starring an ensemble cast, which consists of Wale Ojo, Tope Tedela, Charles Etubiebi, Seun Ajayi, Shawn Faqua, Ali Nuhu, Somkele Iyamah, Emmanuel Ikubese and Afeez Oyetoro. It was written and directed by Dare Olaitan and produced by Olufemi D. Ogunsanwo.

Olaitan wrote Ojukokoro in 2014 and it was his first complete screen-play. The film is ordered in chapters and considerable screen time is devoted to exploring the motivations of the diverse cast with an ironic combination of humor and strong violence. The film was released on 17 March 2017 to a positive critical reception.

== Synopsis ==
"Ojukokoro unwraps an intriguing tale about a money-strapped manager of a shady Petrol Station who decides to rob his employers, but along the line, finds out in a sudden twist that he is not alone in his ambition and that a good reason isn’t always the right one."

== Cast ==
- Tope Tedela as Sunday
- Charles Etubiebi as Manager
- Wale Ojo as Mad Dog Max
- Seun Ajayi as Monday
- Ali Nuhu as Jubril
- Shawn Faqua as Rambo
- Somkele Iyamah as Sade
- Afeez Oyetoro (Saka) as Elder Security Guard
- Emmanuel Ikubese as The Accountant
- Sammie Eddie as DJ
- Gbolahan Olatunde as Soji
- Kayode Olaiya (Aderupoko) as Old Man
- Linda Ejiofor as Bukky
- Kunle Remi as Yemi
- Zainab Balogun as Sunday's Wife

== Production ==
Principal photography began in April 2016. A teaser trailer for the film was released in October 2016. In January 2017, a full length trailer was released for the film.

== Release ==
Ojukokoro was released in Nigerian Cinemas on 17 March 2017.

Ojukokoro screened at the Metrograph in New York in April from the 13–15 April 2018.

Ojukokoro debuted on Netflix streaming services (USA) in April 2021.
