= Genoveva Umeh =

Nigerian actress (born 1995)

- Born: Genoveva Kenechukwu Umeh; 8 May 1995 (age 31); Enugu, Enugu State, Nigeria
- Education: University of Surrey
- Occupation: Actress
- Years active: 2016–present

Genoveva Kenechukwu Umeh (born 8 May 1995) is a British-Nigerian actress. She won the Africa Magic Viewers’ Choice Award for Best Supporting Actress in 2024 for her role in the Prime Video Original as Anna in Breath of Life, and The Future Awards Africa Prize for Acting the same year. She gained wider recognition for her roles in the Netflix series Blood Sisters and Far From Home, and has since taken on leading roles in Nigerian film and television, including The Herd and Siraam. Her performance in The Herd earned her a nomination for Best Lead Actress at the 2026 AMVCA, while her digital work on Situationally Transmitted Delusion with Elozonam Ogbolu earned a nomination for Best Digital Content Creator.

In 2026, she appeared in the short film The Spectacular Death of Prisca, which premiered at the Toronto International Film Festival and received an Honourable Mention from the Short Cuts jury for Best International Short Film.

== Biography ==
Genoveva Umeh was raised both in Nigeria and the United Kingdom. Originally from Anambra State, she was born in Enugu, Enugu State, Nigeria on 8 May 1995. She lived in Enugu until age 12 and received her primary education at Command Children's school, Enugu.

Umeh had her first year of secondary education at Command Day Secondary School, Enugu but later migrated with her family to the United Kingdom in 2006. She completed her secondary and A level education at St Mary's College of Education High School in London, United Kingdom.

Umeh developed an interest in acting during secondary school and studied at the Identity School of Acting in London. She also performed in theatre productions at the Lyric Hammersmith. She later studied law at the University of Surrey, graduating with an LLB degree with honours.

== Career ==
Umeh moved to Lagos, Nigeria in 2018 to pursue her acting career. She wrote and performed a one-woman stage play, HOME, which performed at Lagos Fringe Festival in Lagos, Nigeria and a year later at Bloemfontein, South Africa. She also performed as Lami in a stage play, High in December 2018 and 2019.

She made her screen debut with a supporting role in the film Love Is War. She subsequently appeared in a number of short films and television productions, including A Tune Away and Akinola Davis’s short film , Lizard which was nominated for a BAFTA. She later booked her first lead role in A Tune Away (2020), which earned her a nomination for Best Actress at the 2022 Africa Magic Viewers' Choice -Award 2022. .

Umeh was among the first students admitted to the EbonyLife Creative Academy. She subsequently auditioned for the role of Timeyin Ademola in Blood Sisters, a Netflix crime thriller series, after being recommended to the production by filmmaker Kenneth Gyang. The series marked a wider breakthrough for her, and she subsequently appeared as Zina in the Netflix young adult drama Far From Home. Her subsequent screen roles included The Herd, in which she played Derin, and Siraam, in which she played the title character. The Herd earned her a nomination for Best Lead Actress at the 2026 Africa Magic Viewers’ Choice Awards.

In 2026, Umeh reprised her role as Timeyin in the second season of Blood Sisters, released on Netflix. She also appeared in The Spectacular Death of Prisca, directed by Kaelo Iyizoba, which premiered in the Short Cuts programme at the 2026 Toronto International Film Festival. The film received an Honourable Mention from the Short Cuts jury.

== Filmography ==
=== Film/Television ===
Year	Title	Role	Ref
2019	Blameless	Ezinne	
2019	Love is War	Young Lady	
2020	Survivor's Guilt	Ayobami	
2020	The Crazy Wife	Alicia	
2021	Reflections	Kenena	
2021	Country Hard	Funmi	
2021	Focus	Jess	
2021	All Good Things	Funmi	
2021	Lizard	Khafilat	
2021	The Griot	Associate producer	
2021	One Lagos Night	Anita	
2021	Temi's Diary	Omolara	
2022	Crime & Justice	Shindara	
2022	Blood Sisters	Timeyin	
2022	Far From Home	Zina	
2022	IJO: A Love Story	Molara	
2022	A Tune Away	Anita	
2023	Shuga (Season 5)	Chika	
2023	A Tribe Called Judah	Testimony	
2023	Breath of Life	Anna	
2024	Strawberry Chinny	Chinny	
2025	Baby Farm	Ebun	
2025	Summer Rain	Young Murewa	
2025	The Herd	Derin	
2026	Blood Sisters 2	Timeyin	
2026	Siraam	Siraam	
2026	The Spectacular Death of Prisca	Chimdi/Princess	

=== Theatre ===
Year	Title	Role	Short Notes
2016	Mind Body Soul	Keisha	T.D MOYO (Lyric Hammersmith London)
2018	High On Stage	Lami Philips	Kenneth Uphoho (Rue 14 Studios)
2018	Home	Genoveva Umeh	Ibukun Fasunhan
2018	Dodo	Amarachi	T.D MOYO

== Awards and nominations ==
Year	Award	Category	Result	Ref
2022	Africa Magic Viewers Choice Award	Best Actress in a Drama (A Tune Away)	Nominated	
2023	The Future Awards Africa	Prize for Acting	Nominated	
2024	Africa Magic Viewers' Choice Awards	Best Supporting Actress (Breath of Life)	Won	
2024	The Future Awards Africa	Prize for Acting	Won	
2026	Africa Magic Viewers Choice Awards	Best Lead Actress. (The Herd)	Nominated	
2026	Africa Magic Viewers Choice Awards	Best Digital Creator (Situationally Transmitted Delusion)	Nominated	
