= Oladosu =

Nigerian Given Name

Oládoṣù
- Gender: Male
- Language: Yoruba

Origin
- Origin: Yoruba
- Meaning: "wealth has come of age"
- Region of origin: South-west, Nigeria

Other names
- Variant form: Doṣù
- Related names: Oláwálé; Olátúndé; Olákúnlé; Oláyemí; Olániyì; Oládele; Olásunkanmi; Oládèjì; Olásupo; Olábòwálé; Oláfèmi; Oláseyi; Olákèmi; Oláseye; Olábímpe; Oláṣùpò; Olábíyí; Oládípò; Olásànyà

Oládoṣù audio is a name of Yoruba origin, found among the Yoruba people of South-west Nigeria. The name means "wealth has come of age," symbolising maturity or fulfillment of prosperity. Oládoṣù is used as both a first name and a surname, and it is primarily given to males. Common variant of the name are "Ola" "Doṣù".

== Notable people with the name & surname ==
- Adenike Oladosu (born 1994) Nigerian climate activist.
- Oladosu Oshinowo (1941–2013) Nigerian politician and first speaker of the Lagos State House of Assembly.
