= Isoken Ogiemwonyi =

Nigerian entrepreneur & filmmaker

- Born: Nigeria
- Education: University of Nottingham, Glion Institute of Higher Education, Switzerland, BPP University, London.
- Occupation: Entrepreneur
- Known for: Producer, The Smart Money Woman, Founder and head designer of Symbols of Authority, Obsidian, ZAZAII. Co-founder of Le Petit Marche (LPM), L’Espace, Winterfell Ltd.

Isoken Ogiemwonyi is a Nigerian entrepreneur in film, television and fashion. She is a producer of the Smart Money Woman TV Show, which was nominated for multiple Africa Magic Viewers Choice Awards in 2022 #amvca8 She is the founder and CEO of the fashion label "Obsidian" and retail store "ZAZAII". She is known also as the Co-Founder of Winterfell Ltd, which owns Le Petit Marche Nigeria and L’Espace trademarks. She was the winner of the 2012 MTN Lagos Fashion & Design Week/British Council Young Creative Entrepreneur of the Year. In 2013, The Guardian placed her among the 25 most influential women in Africa.

== Education ==
She is a graduate of Bachelor of Laws from the University of Nottingham. She also has a PGD in Luxury Management from Glion Institute of Higher Education, Switzerland and an MSc in Management from BPP University, London. She also got an IB diploma at Malvern College.

== Career ==
She is one of the producers of the Smart Money Woman TV show which premiered on Netflix in September 2020

Isoken is also a 2021 alumna of Canada’s Reelworld Screen Institute’s Emerging 20 program and a graduate of the 2023 Canadian Film Centre’s Norman Jewison Producer’s Lab, where she developed her slate as part of Canada’s leading film accelerator program.

For 3 years, Isoken was an editor at BellaNaija Style and ran Editorial Business & Strategy at BNStyle. She is a multi disciplinary - Fashion Business, Branding, Media & Content Communications professional and has led campaigns as an independent consultant in different capacities for brands like Clinique, Estee Lauder & Bobbi Brown in Sub Saharan Africa.

For three years, Isoken was an editor at BellaNaija Style and ran Editorial Business & Strategy at BNStyle. She is a multi disciplinary - Fashion Business, Branding, Media & Content Communications professional and has led campaigns as an independent consultant in different capacities for brands like Clinique, Estee Lauder & Bobbi Brown in Sub Saharan Africa. She produced the Smart Money Woman TV show streaming worldwide on Netflix. She was also head of costume design and masterminded the public relations and marketing on the projects first flight on Africa Magic and second window on Netflix

Isoken was the Co-Founder of Winterfell Ltd, which owns Le Petit Marche Nigeria and L’Espace trademarks. She launched in 2009 a womenswear and accessories brand named "Obsidian". Le Petite Marche (LPM) was one of the first fashion discovery platforms in Nigeria, created to bridge the gap in Nigeria fashion retail and help in the distribution and promotion of Nigerian designers . It was also founded in 2009. L’Espace was a department store in Lagos created in 2011 by Isoken and Wonuola Odunsi.

Isoken was the 2012 MTN Lagos Fashion & Design Week/British Council Young Creative Entrepreneur of the Year. Obsidian showcased her work at the 2011 & 2012 MTN Lagos Fashion & Design Week. She also participated in the 2013 Pitti Immagine Trade show in Florence, Italy. She launched a new African fashion and beauty store named "ZAZAII" at Victoria island, Lagos. and a branch of that store opened in Toronto in 2015.
