= Seun Ajayi =

Nigerian actor

- Born: 31 March; Kaduna
- Education: University of Lagos
- Occupation: Actor
- Known for: Hustle

Seun Ajayi is a Nigerian actor. He is a native of Ijebu Ibefun, Ogun State, Nigeria. He is known for his role in the television series Hustle. Ajayi was born on 31 March in Kaduna, the Northern part of Nigeria and is the last child among five children. His family moved to Lagos when he was nine years old. His father is a retired civil servant, and his mother is a business woman. He had his primary and secondary education in Lagos and his tertiary education in the University of Lagos where he graduated with a bachelor's degree in Theatre Arts.

== Life and career ==
Ajayi has received multiple nominations at the Africa Movie Academy Awards (AMAA) and the Africa Magic Viewer's Choice Award for Best Supporting Actor in a Movie and Best Actor in an Original Comedy Series, respectively.

With over 136 hours of Pan-African screen time to his credit as the lead character on Africa Magic's TV sitcom Hustle, Ajayi's talent has also graced the big screen on major film projects including Ojukokoro: Greed, God Calling, The Ghost and the House of Truth, and 93 Days. Other screen credits include The Maze, Gidi Culture, Have a Nice Day, Crimson and Gidi Up.

Ajayi has lent his voice to many brand campaigns, documentaries, and film trailers, working with brands like; Uber, Keystone bank, First Bank, The Guardian, Ndani Communications, Total, Olam, Temple Productions, Telemundo, and DSTV among others.

== Personal life ==
Ajayi married Damilola Oluwabiyi on 9 September 2017. A video of Ajayi excitedly dancing after unveiling his wife at their wedding went viral. In January 2019, he and his wife had their first child together, a boy.

== Family ==
Seun Ajayi has 4 siblings. Dolapo, Sola and Yeside, are his sisters, and his brother Tunde. He also has 2 kids and 10 nieces and nephews.

== Filmography ==
=== Film ===
- Ojukokoro: Greed (2016) as Monday
- Suru L'ere (2016) as Arinze
- Black Val (2016)
- God Calling (2018) as Tope
- 93 Days (2016) as Dr. Niyi Fadipe
- The Ghost and The House of Truth (2019) as Debo
- The Lost Okoroshi (2019) as Raymond
- Uneven (2020) as Mike
- Who Lived at Number 6 (2021) as Kunle
- No Way Through (2023) as Jude Nwafor
- A Troubled Heart (2023) as Sodiq
- JAPA (2024) as Sola
- Through His Eyes (2024) as Ogbutu
- Lisabi: The Uprising (2024) as Olo Olori Ilari

=== Short film ===
- Erased (2016)
- Stuck (2019)
- Buried (2021)
- Closed

=== Television ===
- Hustle (as Dayo)
- Gidi Up (as Wole)
- The Smart Money Woman
- Becoming Abi
- Princess on a Hill (2024–present) as Kayode

=== Web series ===
- Crimson (as Akin)

== Awards and nominations ==
Seun Ajayi has been nominated for awards like:

- The Future awards Africa prize for acting,
- Best actor in a supporting role at Africa Movie Academy Awards
- Best Actor in a comedy series at the Africa Magic Viewer's Choice Awards
- Revelation of the year at City People Movie Awards.

== See also ==
- List of Nigerian actors
