= Slow Country (film) =

Nigerian action-drama film

- Directed by: Eric Aghimien
- Written by: Eric Aghimien
- Produced by: Christian Mordi; Eric Aghimien
- Starring: Ivie Okujaye; Sambasa Nzeribe; Tope Tedela; Majid Michel; Kolade Shasi; Gina Castel; Brutus Richard; Folaremi Agunbiade
- Cinematography: Eric Aghimien
- Edited by: Eric Aghimien
- Music by: Freeman Okafor
- Production company: Hills Pictures
- Distributed by: Genesis Deluxe Distribution
- Release dates: November 2016 (Africa International Film Festival); 19 May 2017
- Running time: 115 minutes
- Country: Nigeria
- Language: English

Slow Country is a Nigerian action-drama film, directed and produced by Eric Aghimien.

The film stars Ivie Okujaye, Sambasa Nzeribe, Tope Tedela, Majid Michel, Richards Brutus, Stephen Damien, Kolade Shasi and Gina Castel.

The film won the Audience Choice Award at the 2016 Africa International Film Festival and gave Sambasa Nzeribe the coveted AMVCA for "Best Actor in a Drama".

== Plot ==
A homeless teenage mother (Ivie Okujaye) who gets herself trapped in prostitution and drug trafficking for seven years in order to secure a good life for her son, decides to quit but her boss, a ruthless human and drug trafficker (Sambasa Nzeribe) is not ready to let go of his most trusted cash cow.

== Cast ==
- Ivie Okujaye as Kome
- Sambasa Nzeribe as Tuvi
- Tope Tedela as Osas
- Majid Michel as Inspector Dave
- Gina Castel as Ola
- Brutus Richard as Brasko
- Folaremi Agunbiade as Femi
- Imoudu 'DJ Moe' Ayonete as Tuvi's Second Man
- Inspector Ogbonna as Victor Erabie
- Adebayo Thomas as Peter
- Emmanuel Ilemobayo as Charger
- Kolade Shasi as Pedro
- Anthony Igwe as Eugene

== Awards and nominations ==
Year	Award	Category	Recipient(s)	Result	Ref.
2016	African International Film Festival (AFRIFF)	Audience Choice Award	Slow Country	Won	
2017	Best of Nollywood Awards	Best Actor in a Lead role –English	Sambasa Nzeribe	Nominated	
2017	Best of Nollywood Awards	Best Actress in a Lead role –English	Ivie Okujaiye	Nominated	
2017	Best of Nollywood Awards	Best Supporting Actor –English	Tope Tedela	Nominated	
2017	Best of Nollywood Awards	Best Child Actor	Adebayo Thomas	Nominated	
2017	Best of Nollywood Awards	Movie with the Best Special Effect	Slow Country	Nominated	
2017	Best of Nollywood Awards	Movie with the Best Screenplay	Slow Country	Nominated	
2017	Best of Nollywood Awards	Movie with the Best Editing	Slow Country	Nominated	
2017	Best of Nollywood Awards	Movie with the Best Cinematography	Slow Country	Nominated	
2017	Best of Nollywood Awards	Best Use of Make up in a Movie	Slow Country	Won	
2017	Best of Nollywood Awards	Movie of the Year	Slow Country	Nominated	
2017	Best of Nollywood Awards	Director of the Year	Slow Country	Nominated	
