= Lagos Talks =

Lagos; Nigeria
- Frequency: 91.3 MHz

Programming
- Format: Talk

Ownership
- Owner: Megalectrics Limited

History
- First air date: 22 September 2016

Links
- Website: lagostalks.com

Lagos Talks is a radio station in Lagos, Nigeria, broadcasting on 91.3 MHz FM. Owned by Megalectrics Limited, it broadcasts a talk radio format targeted at a demographic of between 18-45 years.

It was launched on 22 September 2016.
