= Darrel Bristow-Bovey =

South African author

- Born: Darrel Bristow-Bovey; 6 April 1971; Durban, Kwazulu-Natal, Republic of South Africa.
- Occupations: Columnist; author

Darrel Bristow-Bovey (6 April 1971, Durban) is a South African columnist, travel writer, screenwriter and author. He studied under J. M. Coetzee and André Brink at the University of Cape Town.

He subsequently wrote newspaper columns that were published in the Cape Times, Business Day and The Sunday Independent

In 2015, he wrote that he was living in the Cape Town suburb of Sea Point.

== Bibliography ==
- I Moved Your Cheese (New Holland Publishers, 2001) ISBN 1843301652
- “But I Digress …”: A selection of his best columns (Zebra Press, 2003)
- The Naked Bachelor (Struik Publishers, 2003) ISBN 1868723631
- SuperZero (Tafelberg, 2006)
- One Midlife Crisis and a Speedo (Zebra Press, 2014)
- Finding Endurance: Shackleton, My Father and a World Without End (Icon Books, 2023)
