= Suru L'ere =

2016 film by Mildred Okwo

- Directed by: Mildred Okwo
- Written by: Richard Odilu
- Produced by: Mildred Okwo; Rita Dominic
- Starring: Seun Ajayi; Beverly Naya; Kemi Akindoju; Tope Tedela; Enyinna Nwigwe; Rita Dominic
- Cinematography: Jim Bishop
- Edited by: Carole Gikandi
- Music by: Truth
- Production company: Mord Pictures
- Distributed by: The Audrey Silva Company; Silverbird Film Distribution
- Release date: 12 February 2016
- Country: Nigeria
- Languages: English; Yoruba; Igbo

Suru L'ere is a 2016 Nigerian comedy drama film, co-produced and directed by Mildred Okwo. It stars Seun Ajayi, Beverly Naya, Kemi Lala Akindoju, Tope Tedela and Enyinna Nwigwe, with a special appearance from Rita Dominic.

Set in Lagos, the film revolves around Arinze (Seun Ajayi), a young graduate trainee, who is a serial debtor, desperately eager to get ahead.

== Cast ==
- Seun Ajayi as Arinze
- Beverly Naya as Omosigho
- Tope Tedela as Kyle Stevens Adedoyin
- Kemi Lala Akindoju as Land Lady
- Kenneth Okolie as Bossi
- Enyinna Nwigwe as Godstime
- Gregory Ojefua as Brume
- Bikiya Graham-Douglas
- Rita Dominic as Akara seller (special appearance)

== Production ==
=== Casting ===
In March 2015, it was announced that Beverly Naya would be starring in Suru L'ere. Rita Dominic, who is the executive producer of the film had a cameo appearance as a local Akara seller.

=== Filming ===
Principal photography of Suru L'ere commenced in April 2015, and was shot in ten days.

== Promotions ==
On 16 April 2015, Behind the scenes photos for Suru L'ere were published on BellaNaija. It was also published on Nigerian Entertainment Today and other major media outlets and entertainment blogs. The first official trailer was released on YouTube on 8 September 2015. A Television trailer was released on 15 January 2016.

== Release ==
The film was released on 12 February 2016.
