= Femi Branch =

Nigerian actor, filmmaker and politician

- Born: 14 May 1970 (age 56); Sagamu, Ogun, Nigeria
- Education: Obafemi Awolowo University
- Occupations: Actor, director, producer
- Years active: 1991–present

Femi Branch (born 14 May 1970) is a Nigerian actor, director, producer and politician who contested for deputy governor during the 2023 general election in Ogun state.

== Early life ==
Branch was born on May 14, 1970. His parents were teachers in Sagamu, Nigeria. He attended Satellite Town Primary School at Amuwo Odofin before attending the Airforce Secondary School at Ikeja. He later proceeded to Obafemi Awolowo University where, though admitted for Religious Studies, he later obtained a Bachelor of Arts degree in Dramatic Arts.

== Career ==
Branch began his career at Obafemi Awolowo University in 1991, the same year he featured in a yoruba stage play titled Eniyan. He later featured in a movie titled Orisun (meaning: Origin) produced by members of staff of Obafemi Awolowo University but his first appearance on television was in 2003 in an MTN Group television commercial titled "Dance with me". He appeared in the role of Oscar in a soap opera titled Domino. He has since appeared in over a hundred Nigerian films, a few of which he produced and directed. In 2024, Branch starred in Farmer's Bride - a Nigerian period drama.

== Filmography ==
- A Place In The Stars (2014) as Young Pa Dakim
- Out of Luck (2015)
- New Money (2018)
- Love is War (2019) as Chudi
- Honey Money (2023)
- Red Circle (2025)
- Owambe Thieves (2025) as Oga Bling Bling
- Aiyetoro Town as Baale

== Awards and nominations ==
Year	Award ceremony	Prize	Result	Ref
2018	Best of Nollywood Awards	Best Actor in a Lead Role - English	Nominated	
2025	Africa Magic Viewers' Choice Awards	Best Lead Actor	Nominated	
