= Nengi Adoki =

Nigerian actress (born 1990)

- Born: 17 January 1990 (age 36); Port-Harcourt
- Education: University of Toronto
- Occupation: Actress
- Years active: 2013–present
- Known for: Juju Stories

Nengi Adoki (born 17 January 1990) is a Nigerian actress. She is known for her roles in Nollywood films such as Juju Stories and Chatroom, and web series such as The Men's Club. She was named one of the Top Nollywood actors in 2021, and is an activist for women's issues and police brutality in Nigeria.

== Personal life ==
Nengi Adoki was born on 17 January 1990 in Port-Harcourt, Rivers State, Nigeria. She was raised in Toronto, Canada and received her B.A. in Performing Arts and Information Technology from the University of Toronto in 2013. While at the University of Toronto, she directed and performed in theater productions, including the Afrocentric cultural show Sync Afrique, which was performed in Mississauga annually from 2009 to 2014. Adoki received the African Scholars' Global Impact Award from the University of Toronto in 2019. In 2014, she received a certificate in performing arts from Sheridan College in Oakville, Ontario.

== Career ==
After graduating from Sheridan College, Adoki returned to Nigeria to focus on her acting career. Her debut television role was as a minor character in the final season of Lost Girl. In 2016, she performed in Bolanle Austen-Peter's Wakaa! The Musical, the first Nigerian musical shown at London's West End. In 2018, she starred in the television series Forbidden. She has also appeared in other theatrical productions such as Heartbeat the Musical and No More Lies.

In 2021, Adoki made her film debut as Joy in the third installment of Juju Stories, an anthology film directed by C.J. Obasi, Abba Makama, and Michael Omunua. She received a prize for acting at the Future Awards Africa in 2022 for her performance. She also appeared in several web and television series, primarily on RedTV, including Back to School, The Men's Club, Inspector K, and Baby Drama. Adoki began developing her own comedy web series, The Most Toasted Girl in 2018, which premiered in 2020. The series is based on real experiences dating in Lagos.

In 2022, Adoki played the lead role in Chike Ibekwe's Chatroom, a movie about gender-based violence in Lagos, and appeared in the second season of the show Little Black Book. She also starred in the 2023 film The Trade.

== Filmography ==
- Juju Stories (2021) as Joy
- The Men's Club
- The Trade (2023)
- No Way Through (2023)

== See also ==
- Bimbo Ademoye
- Abayomi Alvin
- Last request (2019 film)
