= Chuks Joseph =

Nigerian actor

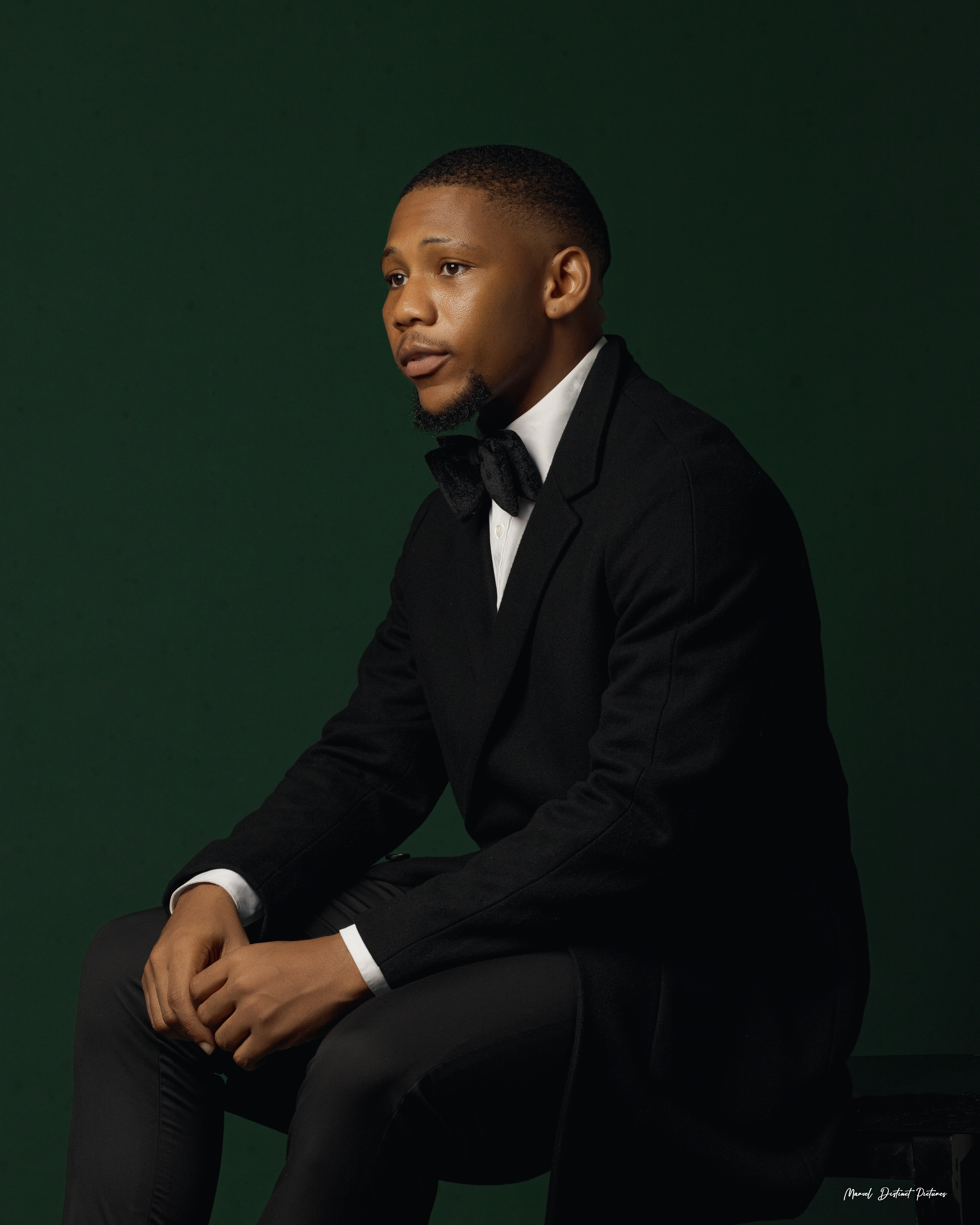
- Born: Odum Chukwuemeka Joseph; January 25; Kaduna, Nigeria (origin. Igbere, Abia State)
- Citizenship: Nigerian
- Education: Federal University of Technology, Owerri
- Occupations: Actor and Model
- Notable work: Dark October, Afamefuna: An Nwa Boi Story, "The Origin: Madam Koi Koi"

Odum Chukwuemeka Joseph (born 25 January) is a Nigerian actor, model, and influencer known professionally as Chuks Joseph. He gained prominence following his debut in the film Dark October based on true-life events.

== Background ==
Chuks was born in Kaduna, Nigeria. Due to the Sharia riots in the early 2000s, his family moved to Aba, Abia State where he and his younger sister were raised by their grandmother. He attended Prize Mates Modela Academy and later studied Microbiology at the Federal University of Technology, Owerri. During his NYSC, Chuks served in Lagos State as a project assistant with Save The Children on the Alive & Thrive project before passing out in 2019.

== Career ==
Chuks debuted as a model in 2020 after a friend helped him apply for the Mr. Ideal Nigeria pageant. He emerged as the first runner-up (Mr. Ideal Nigeria Earth 2020). After playing minor roles in the Africa Magic series Riona, Baby Drama, and Papa Benji, he took acting courses at the Royal Arts Academy and Ebonylife Creative Academy in mid-2021.

He landed his first major role on Ndani TV's Schooled. In September of the same year, he was cast in a lead role in Nigerian blogger and filmmaker Linda Ikeji's first film Dark October. The film, based on the lynching of four young students at the University of Port Harcourt, regarded as the Aluu Four lynching was released on Netflix in February 2023. He trained at the Africa International Film Festival Acting Masterclass in late 2021.

In March 2022, Chuks was cast in The Origin: Madam Koi Koi and Leaked. The Origin: Madam Koi Koi was released on Netflix in October 2023. His performance as Lashe drew attention on social media, helping gain him prominence. He starred in Nwanyi Ike in late 2022 and Masquerades of Aniedo in 2023. He later appeared in supporting roles in the films Criminal and When Love Strikes released to cinemas in May and September 2024. Both films were later released on Amazon Prime. Chuks has also appeared alongside Paul Nnadiekwe in Afamefuna: An Nwa Boi Story (2023) and The Men's Club: Next Gen (2024).

Chuks has modeled for local Nigerian clothing brands Dunni Marque and Off Fit Wears. He was awarded Eko Next Rated Actor at the Eko Heritage Awards 2023, Best Actor in a Film/Television Series at the NXT Honors Awards 2023, and Emerging Actor of the Year at the 2024 Gleams Awards. Chuks was listed as one of Africa Magic's Breakout Stars in 2023 by BellaNaija. Alongside Chimezie Imo, Paul Nnadiekwe, and Mike Afolarin, Chuks appeared on Pulse Nigeria's list of Young Nollywood Actors To Look Out For in 2025. Chuks is known for playing villainous roles. In an interview with Punch's Sunday Scoop, he said "I am not being stereotyped... At times, when one plays a role and plays it a little bit too well, people believe that’s the only role one can play.” In December 2024, he was labeled Nollywood’s New Villain by entertainment publication What Kept Me Up.

On January 31, 2025, Chuks appeared alongside Misters of Nigeria 2023 winner Seyi Araga, as the official host of the announcement show for the 2024 NXT Honors winners. In April 2025, Chuks Joseph played Divine Douglas in the AI-themed film, Makemation.

In February 2026, Chuks was announced alongside Joke Silva, Ego Boyo and more as the Nigerian cast in Chuko and Arie Esiri's second feature film Clarissa also starring Sophie Okonedo, David Oyelowo, Ayo adebiri, Joy Sunday, India Amarteifio and Toheeb Jimoh. In June, he starred in Joseph Coker's Day of the Games Night.

== Filmography ==
Filmography
Year	Title	Role
2021	Riona	Warrior
2021	Schooled	Tunde Savage
2022	Leaked	Uchenna
2022	Nwanyi Ike	Nnamdi
2023	Dark October	Tizzy
2023	Masquerades of Aniedo	Ndubuisi Ezeobi aka Izzy
2023	Afamefuna; An Nwa-Boi Story	Obum
2023	The Origin: Madam Koi-Koi	Lashe
2024	Dead Of Night	Rufus
2024	Criminal	Obi
2024	When Love Strikes	Ebuka
2024	A Love Like Ours	Daniel
2024	The Men's Club (S5): Next Gen	Francis
2025	Makemation	Divine Douglas
2026	Clarissa	
2026	Day of the Games Night	
