= Paul Nnadiekwe =

Nigerian actor (born 2000)

- Born: 29 February 2000 (age 26); Lagos, Nigeria
- Education: University of the People
- Occupations: Actor, filmmaker
- Writing career
- Notable work: I Do Not Come To You By Chance

Paul Nnadiekwe (born 29 February 2000) is a Nigerian actor, filmmaker, and entertainer best known for his roles in the critically acclaimed films I Do Not Come To You By Chance and Afamefuna: An Nwa Boi Story.

== Background ==
Nnadiekwe was born in Lagos, Nigeria. He is the youngest of four children.

== Career ==
Nnadiekwe's developed an interest for acting and storytelling at a young age. He trained at the Africa International Film Festival (AFRIFF) Acting Workshop, earning Best Actor recognition alongside four colleagues. He made his feature film debut in I Do Not Come To You By Chance, an adaptation of Adaobi Tricia Nwaubani's novel, directed by Ishaya Bako and produced by Genevieve Nnaji. The film premiered as an official selection at the 2023 Toronto International Film Festival (TIFF), and he earned critical acclaim for his performance. Also in 2023, Nnadiekwe starred alongside Stan Nze and Alexx Ekubo in Afamefuna: An Nwa Boi Story.

Nnadiekwe's other credits include The Thanksgiving (2020), Schooled (2021), The Secret Life of a Troll (2022), Slum King (2023), and The Men's Club: New Gen (2024). He also wrote and starred with Ruby Akubueze in the short film Purple Story (2022) directed by Yinusa A. Korede.

In 2024, Nnadiekwe was listed alongside Mike Afolarin, Chuks Joseph, and Iremide Adeoye in Top Charts Africa's "Actors to Watch". He began playing Chibuzor in the Africa Magic television series The Low Priest in September 2025.
