= Mob justice in Ghana =

Mob justice is when a person suspected to be a criminal is beaten by a group of people or crowd with clubs, stones, machetes, or anything they can lay their hands on. In some cases the alleged criminal dies in the process due to excessive beating or they are set on fire using old car tires and fuel. Mob justice, also known as ‘instant justice’ or ‘jungle justice’, occurs in various towns and cities in Ghana. According to the laws of Ghana, this act is illegal and intolerable, but it occurs at an increasing rate. People who engage in this act are usually onlookers or people passing by or an organized group also known as "community vigilantes" whose aim is to protect the community from criminals.

In Ghana, it is not only alleged criminals that sometimes face mob justice; people suspected to be witches, wizards, adulterers and homosexuals sometimes find themselves in such situations. Due to the lack of trust in the law enforcement system in Ghana people resort to taking the law into their own hands and deal with these alleged criminals their own way.

== Reasons for mob justice ==
From various research and surveys, people attributed the action of mob justice to;

- The legal system being slow and the courts adjourning cases when there is empirical evidence on a crime committed. The delays in the court process of dealing with alleged criminals when there is hard core evidence does not sit well with the public, hence they prefer to handle criminals their own way than to hand them over to the police. The people are usually impatient when it comes to the justice delivery system in Ghana.
- Punishment given to criminals does not deter them and others from committing crimes. In order to serve as a deterrent to others from committing crimes in a community the public thinks apprehended criminals do not face long jail terms or severe punishment. Hence, they seek to mob justice to send a message to other criminals in the community and the victims as well.
- The police and the judicial systems are seen to be corrupt, therefore criminals are not dealt with properly and they are later found walking on the streets freely. The public believes that these criminals have acquaintance with the police and when they are apprehended, they are left to go within a short time. With this lack of trust in the police, people in communities tend to take matters into their own hands in order to seek justice for themselves.
- When people do not know what happens to convicted criminals and also when sentences given to them are not reasonable. With the lack of information and transparency from law enforcement, the people prefer to deal with suspected persons themselves than to hand them over to the police.

In the journal Implication of mob justice practice among communities in Ghana a survey conducted by Ernest Adu-Gyamfi on 1,000 people, including males and females, in the Kumasi Metropolis which is the capital city of the Ashanti Region, consist of 20 suburbs and people who are 18 years and above. 51% of the respondents in the survey have secondary education while 23.7% have tertiary education. In response to the causes of mob justice, 47.9% strongly agree that delay in justice is a major cause of the action in the metropolis, 45% agree and 4% disagree with that claim. With the aspect of prolonged police investigations as one of the causes of mob justice, 63.7% strongly agree and 30% agree. 81.2% of the respondents strongly agree that they are not satisfied with the sentences sometimes emitted to convicted criminals and 18.8% strongly disagree with the dissatisfaction level of criminal sentence. On the claim of the judicial and police service being corrupt and being the cause of mob justice, 44.4% strongly agree and 55.6% strongly disagree. Also, 79.5% strongly agree to mob justice serving as a deterrent to other criminals.

For the claim that people who are involved in the act of mob justice are ignorant and not aware that their actions are illegal and strip victims of fundamental human rights, 84.9% strongly disagree and 15.1% agree with this claim. With this assertion, perpetrators of this act are fully aware of the consequences of their actions but still engage in the act of mob justice.

== Laws against mob justice ==
Mob Justice is a criminal offence pursuant to Act 29 of the Criminal Code of 1960 which covers the various aspect of mob justice.

- Section 46 “Whoever commits murder shall be liable to suffer death”.
- Section 47 “Whoever intentionally causes the death of another person by any unlawful harm is guilty of murder, unless his crime is reduced to manslaughter by reason of such extreme provocation, or other matter of partial excuse”.
- Section 48 “Whoever attempts to commit murder shall be guilty of first degree felony”.
- Section 69 “Whoever intentionally and unlawfully causes harm to any person shall be guilty of second degree felony”.
- Section 84 “Whoever unlawfully assaults any person is guilty of a misdemeanor”.

Also Chapter 5 of the constitution of Ghana protects the fundamental human rights and freedoms of a person.

Article 13 states that “No person shall be deprived of his life intentionally except in the exercise of the execution of a sentence of a court in respect of a criminal offence under the laws of Ghana of which he has been convicted”.

Article 15 talks about "RESPECT FOR HUMAN DIGNITY" and that;

- “The dignity of all persons shall be inviolable”.
- “No person shall, whether or not he is arrested, restricted or detained, be subjected to; torture or other cruel, inhuman or degrading treatment or punishment; any other condition that detracts or is likely to detract from his dignity and worth as a human being”.

Article 19 requires FAIR TRIAL for;

- “A person charged with a criminal offence is given a fair hearing within a reasonable time by a court”.
- “A person charged with a criminal offence is presumed to be innocent until he is proved or has pleaded guilty”.

All the above mentioned are legal provisions that protects suspected criminals from the act of mob justice or instant justice.
