= Alexa Keas =

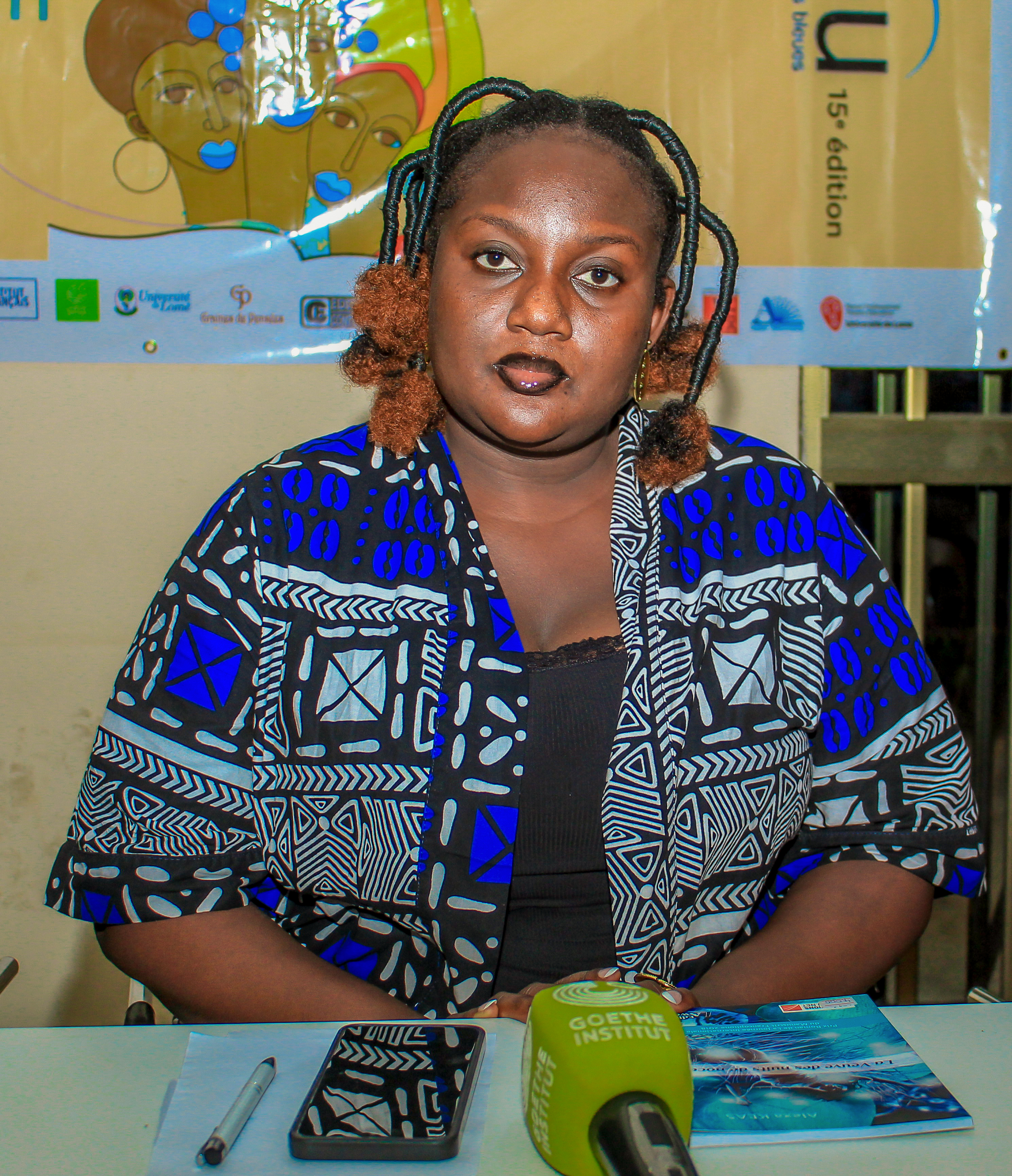
- Occupation: Writer

Alexa Keas is the penname of Togolese novelist and screenwriter Essi Sandra Klénam Amable. A prolific romance, erotica, and "chick lit" author, she published thirty books in a single decade.

Keas began writing in 2014. Her career started by selling her writing chapter by chapter via her Facebook page, which she named "L’instant d’une évasion" (The Moment of an Escape), then she began releasing her works in digital form on Amazon. Her first print novel, Sexy évasion (Sexy Escape), was released in 2018 by the Lomé-based publisher Editions Awoudy. The works of Keas and other Togolese romance novelists often do not have the traditional happy endings associated with the genre, and sometimes deal with heady themes including, death, witchcraft, the pressure to bear children, sterility, illegitimacy, and plights of domestic workers. Her novel La veuve des nuits de noces (The Widow of Wedding Nights) won the best novel prize at the 2018 Journée du manuscrit francophone and was simultaneosly published in Togo and France by Editions Awoudy and Editions du Net. The story was inspired by the death of Ghanaian Captain Maxwell Adam Mahama, who was lynched in 2017 after a mob thought he was an armed robber. For her book Piégée, she won the Prix Littéraires du Togo for Best Female Writer in 2024.

She was also the screenwriter for seven episodes of the television show Hospital IT, which aired on New World TV and TV5Monde Afrique.

== Bibliography ==
- L’enfant illégitime (The Illegitimate Child). Released on Facebook and Amazon. (2017).
- La bonne (The Maid), vol. 1&2. Released on Facebook and Amazon. (2017).
- Sexy Evasion (Sexy Escape). Lomé: Awoudy, Collection Papillon. (2018).
- Le Mariage, ce combat (Marriage, this combat).. Released on Facebook and Amazon. (2018).
- Rédemption. Released on Facebook and Amazon. (2019).
- La veuve des nuits de noces (The Widow of Wedding Nights). Lomé/Paris: Awoudy, Collection Cachet/Les Éditions du Net. (2019).
- Abusée (Abused), vol. 1&2. Released on Facebook and Amazon. (2021).
- Ma mère était une prostituée (2021).
- Piégée, vol 1. (2022).
- Piégée, vol 2. (2023).
