= Johnson Alabi =

Nigerian model and pageant titleholder

- Born: Johnson Omeiza Alabi; Ogun State, Nigeria
- Other name: Jodrey Banks
- Occupations: model; fitness entrepreneur
- Beauty pageant titleholder
- Title: Mr Ideal Nigeria 2020
- Major competitions: Mr Ideal Nigeria 2020; (Winner); Mister Africa International 2021

Johnson Omeiza Alabi, also known as Jodrey Banks, is a Nigerian model, fitness entrepreneur, and pageant titleholder who was crowned Mr Ideal Nigeria at the Mr Ideal Nigeria competition on August 30, 2020. He was Nigeria's representative at Mister Africa International 2021.

== Background and education ==
Johnson is a native of Kogi state, but was born in Ogun State, and grew up in Ikenne Remo, Ogun State. He is a graduate of Obafemi Awolowo University and the University of East London.

== Career ==
Before pageantry, Johnson founded Ace Ride, a Lagos-based company that focuses on inter-city travel, luxury vehicle rentals, and transport/tour management.

In 2020, he contested for Mr Ideal Nigeria alongside 39 other contestants and emerged the winner. He also proceeded to represent Nigeria at Mister Africa International. The win exposed him to endorsement deals and brand campaigns with Globacom, Trophy Lager Beer, DSTV, Hero Beer, and a Nigerian Premier League project.

He also represented Nigeria at Mercedes-Benz Fashion Week in Accra, Ghana, in December 2020.

Johnson started Starke Fitness during the COVID-19 lockdown, which started from a free virtual fitness group to help people stay fit while confined to their homes. Starke Fitness now has physical fitness facilities in Lagos, Ile-Ife, and Abuja.

In 2024, Starke Fitness launched its first and biggest fitness and recreational experience center in Nigeria, located at Ojuelegba, Lagos. He further won the Business Award in 2024.

In 2025, he was appointed grand patron of Mr Ideal Nigeria 2025 Edition.

In 2025, he was elected President of the Rotary Club of Shomolu for the 2027/2028 Rotary year.

== Personal life ==
Johnson got married in 2024, and he has a daughter
