= Mob justice in South Africa =

Extrajudicial killings in South Africa

Mob justice refers to the extrajudicial killing or assault of individuals by the community members acting outside the formal legal system, in most cases it's a response to perceived criminal activity. The practice, also referred to as vigilantism, represents one of the most persistent and legally complex manifestations of South Africa's ongoing crisis of public safety, institutional distrust, and unresolved historical trauma.

According to research by the Institute for Security Studies, at least two people die each day as a result of mob violence or vigilante attacks in the country The South African Police Service recorded at least 1,202 of the 21,325 murders in the 2019/2020 financial year as linked to mob justice, and the figure is widely believed to be an undercount since police do not establish motives in all murder cases. By 2022, of the unprecedented 27,000 recorded murders that year, at least 1,894 — roughly 7% — were attributed to mob justice and vigilantism, more than double the figure from five years prior. In the first nine months of 2023 alone, a further 1,472 mob justice deaths were registered.

== Historical context ==
Mob justice and vigilantism have been documented in South Africa since before the advent of formal democracy in 1994. Under the apartheid system, Black communities were policed by a state apparatus widely perceived as hostile, corrupt, and indifferent to crime committed against Black people. its roots extend through the apartheid era, when the formal justice system was experienced by the majority Black population as a tool of oppression rather than protection, giving rise to self-defence units, street committees, and community-based enforcement structures in townships and informal settlements.

Necklacing, the killing of a person by forcing a tyre around their body, dousing it in fuel, and setting it alight — first emerged in 1985 as a method of extrajudicial punishment during the anti-apartheid/anti colonial struggle, primarily directed at individuals accused of collaborating with or informing for the apartheid state, known as impimpis (sell outs). The practice became a subject of international controversy in 1986 when Winnie Mandela, then wife of the imprisoned Nelson Mandela, made a statement that was widely interpreted as an endorsement of necklacing as a tool of liberation "Together, hand in hand, with our boxes of matches and our necklaces we shall liberate this country." although she later did deny she ever said those words.

== Causes ==
=== Distrust of the criminal justice system ===
The most commonly cited driver of mob justice in South Africa is the collapse of trust between communities and formal law enforcement institutions. A 2018 Afrobarometer survey found that 66% of South Africans do not trust the police or the courts. Communities in high-crime areas frequently report that they have identified criminals to police and received no response, that witnesses are too afraid to testify, and that suspects who are arrested are released and return to the same are, some people believe if they report the criminals to the police they'll just be released on bail. The South African Human Rights Commission has noted that negative perceptions of the justice system are not simply cynical but reflect documented failures at multiple levels of the criminal justice chain, from investigation to prosecution to sentencing.

=== Socioeconomic conditions ===
South Africa has one of the highest levels of income inequality in the world, with a Gini coefficient consistently among the highest globally. High unemployment, poverty, inadequate housing, and the concentration of economic exclusion in the same communities where crime rates are highest create a volatile environment in which the temptation to bypass slow or ineffective formal processes is strong. Research published by the Centre for the Study of Violence and Reconciliation has noted that violence has become a normalised language in these communities — not in a trivialising sense, but in the sense that violence is the default register through which disputes, violations, and grievances are resolved when all other channels have closed.

=== Historical and psychological trauma ===
Some Scholars working in the field of violence prevention have consistently argued that such violence in South Africa cannot be fully understood without accounting for the intergenerational trauma produced by apartheid and, before it, colonial dispossession. The unresolved psychological residue of a society structured around violence — in which communities were both subjected to state violence and forced to produce their own violent responses to survive — does not disappear with a constitutional settlement. The Centre for the Study of Violence and Reconciliation has described mob violence as an eruption of unresolved issues from a traumatic past that South African society has left unaddressed for too long.

=== Belief systems and witchcraft accusations ===
In some regions within South Africa, particularly in rural areas in the Eastern Cape, Limpopo, and KwaZulu-Natal, mob justice is triggered not by accusations of conventional crime but by accusations of witchcraft. Elderly women are disproportionately targeted, frequently accused of causing illness, death, or misfortune in a community through supernatural means. In May 2026, 75-year-old Nokhansala Sidiki was dragged from her home in Ngcobo, Eastern Cape, by family members who accused her of witchcraft; she was assaulted with a plank and drowned in a nearby stream. In 2021, Jostina Sangweni, a 59-year-old woman in Mapetla, Soweto, was set on fire by a mob that accused her of witchcraft; preliminary police evidence subsequently showed she had been mentally unwell.

== Notable incidents ==
=== Zandspruit massacre (2021) ===
The single most prominent mob justice incident in post-apartheid South Africa occurred on 19 May 2021 in the Zandspruit informal settlement in Honeydew, Johannesburg. A vigilante group, which operated parallel to the local Community Policing Forum, abducted nine young men from their homes, marched them to a soccer field, and subjected them to sustained assault with stones, sjamboks, and axes. Tyres were placed around their necks, doused in paraffin, and set alight. Eight of the nine men died — four at the scene and four later in hospital. One survivor escaped by reportedly pleading for his hands to be cut rather than submit to necklacing. Witnesses described the violence taking place in front of children and older community members. Fourteen people were subsequently arrested and charged. Residents who testified said they had repeatedly reported the men to police as suspected criminals and received no response.

=== PAGAD and the Cape Flats (1996–2002) ===
People Against Gangsterism and Drugs, known as PAGAD, was formed in 1995 by residents of Cape Flats communities in Cape Town in response to the severe deterioration of public safety caused by gang violence and drug trafficking. Initially a multi-religious civic organisation, it became predominantly Muslim in leadership and grew rapidly on the Cape Flats. In August 1996, during a march on the home of Rashaad Staggie, co-leader of the Hard Livings gang, members of the PAGAD crowd beat and burned Staggie to death in the street. The incident marked PAGAD's transformation from a protest movement into a vigilante force. Its covert operational wing, known as the G-Force, is believed to have been responsible for the killing of numerous gang leaders as well as a campaign of urban bombings between 1998 and 2002 that targeted restaurants, courts, tourist sites, and government buildings. South African intelligence services eventually dismantled the G-Force, and PAGAD was designated a terrorist organisation.

=== Xenophobic incidents ===
On 6 April 2022, Elvis Nyathi, a 43-year-old undocumented Zimbabwean national, was dragged from hiding by a mob going door-to-door demanding passports in Diepsloot; he was beaten, stoned and set alight approximately 20 metres from his home. His wife Nomsa was spared after showing her passport. Zimbabwe granted him a state-assisted funeral.

Isaac Sithole, a 35-year-old Zimbabwean father of three, was caught by a mob while fleeing his burning home in Katlehong toward a police station; he was beaten, doused in petrol and set alight in the street. His widow Lydia Chimbirimbiri was sheltering nearby with their six-week-old baby.

On 18 April 2015, Emmanuel Sithole, a Mozambican stree trader, was surrounded by four men in Alexandra Township, Johannesburg, bludgeoned with a wrench and stabbed; he died of his injuries after journalists who witnessed the attack drove him to a nearby clinic. The attack was photographed in full sequence by Sunday Times photojournalist James Oatway and published on the front page, generating international reaction.

== Victims and demographics ==
A retrospective study conducted at the Germiston Forensic Pathology Service Medico-legal Mortuary covering the period from 2006 to 2016 found that all victims of mob justice were Black, with 99.4% being male, and the largest proportion aged between 21 and 30. A similar study at the Ga-Rankuwa Medico-legal Mortuary covering 2012 to 2014 found that all victims were male and primarily Black African. The most prevalent injuries were blunt force trauma, recorded in 87% of cases, followed by burns, sharp force injuries, and combined injuries.

A recurring concern is the killing of innocent people: researchers and law enforcement have documented that mob justice accusations frequently lack evidence, that personal revenge is a common motive for initiating mob action, and that individuals misidentified by a crowd have no opportunity to defend themselves before violence is inflicted. Witchcraft accusations rooted in community belief, rather than evidence, have similarly led to fatal mob violence, with researchers noting that patterns of gossip and rumour are central to the dynamics of such accusations. Lieutenant General Mondli Zuma a former Mpumalanga provincial police commissioner stated that "mob justice, also known as vigilantism, is not only illegal, but inherently has the potential of having innocent people suffering the brunt of the community and usually end up being killed."
