= Mr Ideal Nigeria =

Beauty pageant in Nigeria

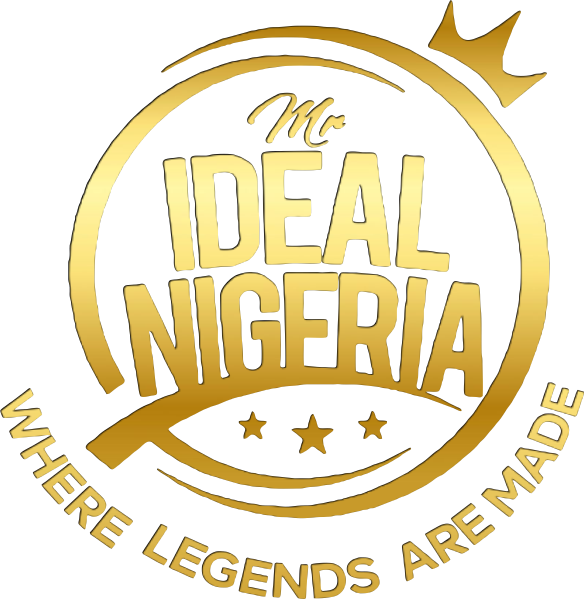
- Formation: 2010
- Type: Beauty pageant
- Headquarters: Lagos
- Location: Nigeria
- Pageant organiser: House of Twitch
- Website: houseoftwitch.com

Mr Ideal Nigeria which was established in 2010 is an annual pageant that empowers young men in Nigeria physically, socially and economically. The winner of Mr Ideal Nigeria automatically represents Nigeria at Mister Africa International. Mr Ideal Nigeria emerged best male pageant brand of the year at the Eko Heritage awards in 2023.

The pageant was created by House of Twitch and has produced notable figures in the entertainment sector, including Mister Africa International, Emmanuel Umoh, (1st Nigerian to win Mr Africa), Yemi Cregz (Big Brother Housemate), Alvin Abayomi, Hermes and Gedoni (Big Brother house mates), Nollywood Actor Jidekene (from living in Bondage) Zeal (Mercedes Benz Fashion week), Zander (Dubai Fashion week) and several others

The current title holder is Victor Eko who represented Edo State at the competition.

== Competition ==
Every year contestants are being selected from all 36 states in Nigeria and the FCT to contest for the title. Registration is done on their official website and is open to all Nigerian males. As at 2023, the winner of this pageant gets a cash prize of 5 million naira, a car, scholarship to Royal Arts Academy, becomes an ambassador to top fashion labels, and also represent Nigeria at the Mister Africa International.

Other winners that are being crowned at the competition is Mr Ideal Nigeria-Tourism, Mr Ideal Nigeria-Earth, Mr Ideal Nigeria-ECOWAS, who stands a chance to represent Nigeria at Mr Tourism World in Brazil and Man of the World in Philippines.

== History ==
The maiden edition of the Mr Ideal Nigeria competition was launched in 2010 and was held in Akure and has since then become an annual event and a life changing one for its participants. A total of 15 successful editions have been held annually since 2010.

The Mr Ideal Nigeria 2012 raised money for children who have been affected by the recent bombings in the country in partnership with Project Friendship Initiative.

Some notable persons that emerged from Mr Ideal Nigeria are; Emmanuel Umoh (1st Nigerian to win Mister Africa), Yemi Cregz (Big Brother Housemate), Alvin Abayomi, Hermes and Gedoni (Big Brother house mates), Jidekene (from living in Bondage) Zeal (Mercedes Benz Fashion week), Zander (Dubai Fashion week) and several others.

Judges of pageant have included; Stan Nze, Big Brother Naija stars Boma and Yerins, and Victor Okpala

== International level ==
Mr Ideal Nigeria 2019, Emmanuel Umoh became the first Nigerian to win the Mr Africa International title since its inception in 2011. The 6’3 ft model from Akwa Ibom State, edged out 24 other contestants from other African countries.

Mr Ideal Nigeria 2023, Rickie Mannie became the second Nigerian to emerge Mr Africa International beating 30 other contestants from other African countries to the title

Mister Ideal Nigeria – Earth 2022, Alexander Joseph-Ojiavor, represented Nigeria at the 2023 edition of the Man of the World competition held in Makati, Philippines, becoming the organization’s first representative to the pageant where he finished as one of the Top 17.

Mr Ideal Nigeria runner-up, 2024, Dr. Jide Ayomide represented Nigeria in Salvador de Bahia, Brazilmaking him Nigeria’s first representative in the Mister Tourism World competition.

== Titleholders ==
List of winners of Mr Ideal Nigeria from its inception
Year	Titleholder	Notes	Ref
2010	Wale Bello	Represented Nigeria at the WCOPA in Los Angeles winning the best model medal	
2011	Ayotunde Ajiboye	CEO of Clipse Entertainment	
2012	Abayomi Alvin	Now a Nollywood actor and model	
2013	Dayo Ifepariola	Modelled at Mercedez benz fashion week, Abuja	
2014	Stanley Igwilo	Emerged Mr West Africa. Now the CEO of Next Fitness outfit, Abuja.	
2015	John Iwueke	Walked some of the biggest runways, appeared in commercials for Airtel Nigeria, Vodafone Uganda etc.	
2016	Prince Ehirim	Featured in movie Calabash. covered several magazines including Ultimate Fitness, La Mode Magazine.	
2017	Steve Onyeneke	Emerged face of 9mobile. walked on several fashion shows including African fashion week Nigeria.	
2018	Chuckie Ihebuzor	Emerged 2nd runner up at Mr Africa international. He is currently the face of BYC, an international underwear company.	
2019	Emmanuel Umoh	Emerged Mr Africa international 2019	
2020	Jodrey Alabi	Represented Nigeria at Mr Africa International	
2021	Anthony Okechukwu	Humanitarian and entrepreneur	
2022	Ronald Shakur	I.T consultant	
2023	Rickie Mannie	Emerged Mr Africa International 2023	
2024	Daniel Olatunji	Represents Nigeria at Mr Africa International	
2025	Obadan Shammah	Represent Nigeria at Mister Africa International	
2026	Victor Eko	Represent Nigeria at Man of the World and Mister Africa International	

== Awards and nominations ==
Award	Year	Category	Results	Ref.
Eko Heritage Awards	2023	Best Male pageant brand of the year	Won	
