= The Origin: Madam Koi-Koi =

- Directed by: Jay Franklyn Jituboh
- Produced by: Jay Franklyn; Dale Falola
- Starring: Ireti Doyle; Chioma Chukwuka; Martha Ehinome; Omowumi Dada; Jude Chukwuka; Nene Aliemeke
- Release dates: 31 October 2023 (Part 1); 7 November 2023 (Part 2)
- Country: Nigeria
- Languages: English and Yoruba

The Origin: Madam Koi-Koi is a 2023 Nollywood two-part horror film produced by Jay Franklyn Jituboh and Dale Falola. The film tells the story of the popular Madam Koi-Koi myth, which centers a ghost who haunts dormitories, hallways and toilets in boarding schools at night. The two-part film started streaming on Netflix on 31 October 2023. The film stars Ireti Doyle, Martha Ehinome, Nene Aliemeke, Chioma Chukwuka, Deyemi Okanlawon, Omowunmi Dada, Ejiro Onojaife, Chuks Joseph, Kevin T. Solomon, Temidayo Akinboro, Iremide Adeoye and others.

== Synopsis ==
Set between 1971 and 1991, the film tells the story of Amanda, a young schoolgirl who has recently moved to a new school. She finds it difficult to fit into the new school, as she repeatedly has strange and terrifying dreams which lead her to conclude that there is something wrong with her school. Amanda's bunkmate and friend, Edna, warns her to stay away from the "popular kids", as anyone who gets close to them ends up hurt. Amanda discovers that the violent occurrences are the work of Madam Koi-Koi, a vengeful ghost haunting the school.Set in Malomo

== Selected cast ==
- Martha Ehinome as Amanda
- Jude Chukwuka as Baba Fawole
- Ireti Doyle as Mother Superior
- Nene Aliemeke as Edna
- Omowunmi Dada as Madam Koi Koi
- Chuks Joseph as Lashe
- Kelvin T. Solomon as Tokunbo
- Temidayo Akinboro as Kayode
- Tolulope Odebunmi as Ige
- Bolaji Ogunmola as Amanda's Mum
- Iremide Adeoye as Idowu
- Ejiro Onojaife as Ibukun
- Edna Ese as Dayo
- Nifemi Lawal as Junior under the bed
- Rachael Isaac as Suzy
- Tessy Brown as Miss Adesola
- Chioma Chukwuka as Sister Ruth
- Deyemi Okanlawon as Theophilus
- Baaj Adebule as Oscar

== Production and release ==
The Origin: Madam Koi-Koi was shot in the Abeokuta area of Ogun state, Nigeria. The shooting ran for about three weeks. The first part of the film was released on Halloween 2023, while the second part will be released on November 7, 2023. The film prides herself as Nollywood’s first Netflix horror series.
