= Abayomi Alvin =

Nigerian actor and model

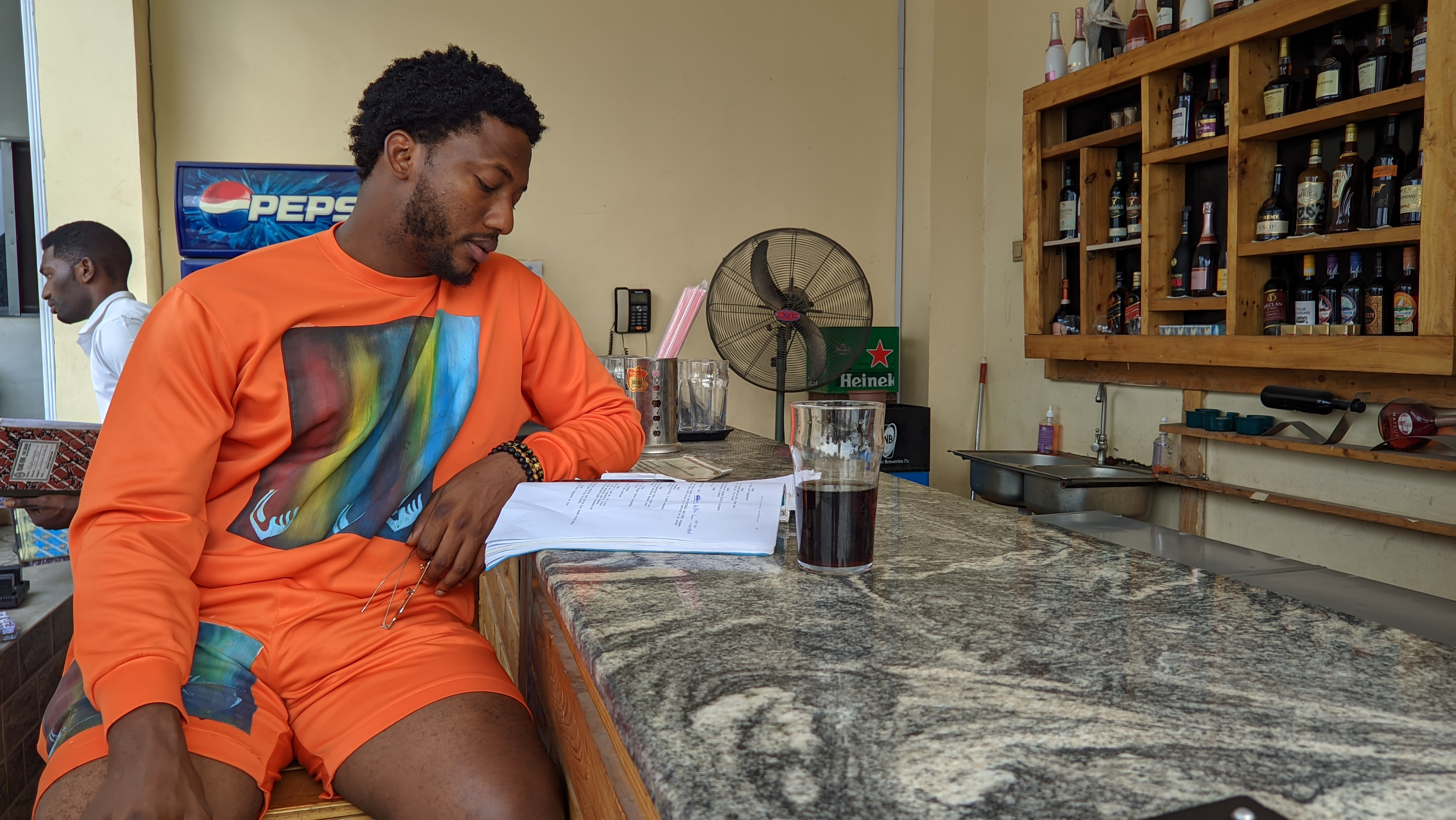
- Abayomi Alvin on set of Breakout
- Born: Abayomi Alvin; June 20, 1993 (age 32); Lagos
- Citizenship: Nigerian
- Occupations: Actor, model
- Years active: 2013–present
- Known for: Calabash banking Series, Collateral war, Jenifa's diary, Isoken, MTV Shuga Naija, Moms at war
- Awards: 19teen Rom awards Best Actor award, Maya awards industry Cynosure

Towase Abayomi Alvin (born June 20, 1993) is a Nigerian actor and model known for his achievements in the entertainment industry. He has been recognized with several awards for his contributions.

== Filmography ==
- Kasala (2018) as Bully
- Moms at War (2018)
- LOUD (2020)
- A Naija Christmas (2021) as Chike
- Breakout (2022) as Femi Bankole

== Career ==
Alvin embarked on his professional acting career in 2013, becoming part of the Nollywood scene. He secured his debut role in the movie Collateral War (2014), directed by Iwuanyanwu Chuks and produced by Chioma Okeke, alongside prominent actors such as Yvonne Jegede and John Dumelo.

He continued to expand his portfolio, featuring in notable Nollywood productions including Calabash Banking Series by Obi Emelonye, where he played a supporting role. His acting repertoire includes appearances in renowned television series such as Jenifa's Diary, Isoken, MTV Shuga Naija, Jemeji, Moms at War, The Johnsons, Alive, Mentally, Truth, A Naija Christmas, You and Me, and The Guys.

In 2022, Alvin was cast in a secondary role for the dance-drama TV series Breakout, directed by Benneth Nwankwo. This series marked a significant milestone as Nigeria's first dance-drama TV series.

== Awards and recognitions ==
Throughout his career, Abayomi has been honored with various awards and nominations. Notably, he received the Best Actor award at the 19teen Rom Awards in 2017. His accomplishments have been acknowledged by the Industry Cynosure accolade from Maya Awards.

Additionally, Abayomi's talent has garnered nominations at esteemed events like the Best of Nollywood Awards (Revelation of the Year, 2017), City People Entertainment Awards (Most Promising Actor - English), African Entertainment Legends Awards (Most Promising Actor), Nigerian Achievers Awards (Next Rated Actor, 2018), Tush All Youth Awards (Revelation of the Year), and Scream All Youth Awards (Most Promising Actor, 2018).

In 2022, he secured a nomination for The Future Awards Africa Prize For Acting, standing alongside peers such as Teniola Aladese, Maryam Yahaya, Nengi Adoki, Temi Ami-Williams, Emeka Nwagbaraocha, and Bimbo Ademoye.

== See also ==
- List of Nigerian actors
