= Segilola Ogidan =

Nigerian actress

- Born: Nigeria
- Education: Royal Holloway University of London
- Occupations: Actress; filmmaker

Segilola Ogidan is a Nigerian actress. She is a graduate of Media Arts from Royal Holloway University of London, she also has a master's degree from University of Bristol where she majored in cinema studies. She is popularly known for playing "Ajike" in Netflix original film, A Naija Christmas.

Segilola started acting professionally after her studies when she landed a role in Peter Pan at The Kings Head Theater, a stage play musical directed by Stephanie Sinclaire. Segilola appeared in RED TV's series, The Men's Club where she played the character "Tonye". Ogidan has also appeared in some other movies including the Netflix film released in 2022, Glamour Girls, Fault Lines, Payday, Tainted Canvas, Over The Bridge, and recently in 2024 The Man Died.

== Filmography ==
- Glamour Girls (2022) as Helion
- Fault Lines (TV movies) as Adina
- A Naija Christmas (2021) Ajike
- The Olive (TV Series)
- The Men's Club (Nigerian web series)
- Payday (2018) as Yemisole Bankole
- Mum, Dad, Meet Sam (2014) as Funmi
- Hot Pepper (2015 TV series) as Lisa
- Unspoken (2012)
- Tainted Canvas (2021), directorial debut
- Over the Bridge (2023)
- The Man Died (2024 film)

== Nomination and recognition ==
In 2022, Segilola was nominated for the NET honor award in the category breakout actress of the year, she was nominated for her performance as the star actor in the film, A Naija Christmas.
