= Victor Okpala =

Nigerian entrepreneur and music curator

- Born: August 8
- Known for: African music marketing
- Notable work: Nabsolute Media

Victor Okpala (born August 8) is a Nigerian entrepreneur, culture curator and founder of NABSolute Media. In 2020, NABSolute Media was listed by US publication Billboard as one of the gatekeepers in Africa’s entertainment ecosystem for their work in communications and music marketing.

After resigning his job as a full time journalist with Net.ng in 2019 to set up NABSolute Media, a communications agency that caters primarily to the music and creative industry. He has since managed projects for Runtown, Reekado Banks, Red Bull, Livespot, Gidi Fest, streaming service; UduX, Seyi Shay, Skales, Dare Art Alade, K1 De Ultimate and more.

Victor was among the judges at the 13th edition of Mr Ideal Nigeria in 2022.
