= Over the Bridge (film) =

2023 film directed by Tolu Ajayi

Over the Bridge is a psychological thriller film about the intersection between a man’s mental health and his moral conflict, directed by Tolu Ajayi, written and produced by Tosin Otudeko [The Garden Theatre] and produced by Bose Oshin.

== Cast ==
- Ozzy Agu
- Joke Silva
- Deyemi Okanlawon
- Segilola Ogidan
- Akin Lewis
- Elma Mbadiwe
- Tosin Osinaike
- Chimezie Imo
- Ropo Ewenla
- Adeyemi Akinsanya
- Paul Adams.
