= The Trade (film) =

2023 Nigerian film

- Directed by: Jadesola Osiberu
- Written by: Jáde Osiberu
- Starring: Nengi Adoki, Chiwetalu Agu, Blossom Chukwujekwu, Rita Dominic, Shawn Faqua, Ali Nuhu, Stan Nze, Gideon Okeke, Kelechi Udegbe, Gregory Ojefua, Mercy Aigbe Gentry, Dénola Grey, Franca Brown, Calabar Chic, Q97483819, Uru Eke
- Release dates: 2023
- Country: Nigeria
- Language: English

The Trade is a Nigerian crime drama film directed by Jadesola Osiberu. Released in Nigeria on January 13, 2023, the film draws inspiration from true events and delves into kidnapping and the pursuit of justice.

== Synopsis ==
The film revolves around an elusive kidnapper known only by the name Eric, who has terrorized communities in the southern part of Nigeria for over a decade. His reign leaves victims and their families traumatized. However, when he takes on a job that brings the law closer than ever before, the stakes escalate dramatically.

== Cast ==
- Rita Dominic as Doris
- Blossom Chukwujekwu as Eric
- Gideon Okeke as Spark
- Nengi Adoki as Nneka
- Chiwetalu Agu as Kidnap Driver
- Shawn Faqua as Charles
- Wale Iruobe as Chidinma
- Ali Nuhu as Bukar
- Stan Nze as Meshach
- Gregory Ojefua as Ebuka
- Kelechi Udegbe
- Lami George as Amina
- Denola Grey as Victim
- Mercy Aigbe as Victim's Mum
- Franca Brown as Victim's wife
- Stephanie Isuma as Caro
- Uru Eke as Blessing
- Yemi Solade as Shotunbo
- Chidi Okeke as Uche
- Sidney Esiri as Ekene
- Chris Iheuwa as Doris' Husband
- Francis Odega as Lawrence
