= Juju Stories =

- First film poster
- Directed by: C.J. Obasi; Abba Makama; Michael Omonua
- Written by: C.J. Obasi; Abba Makama; Michael Omonua
- Produced by: Oge Obasi
- Starring: Belinda Agedah Yanga; Paul Utomi; Elvis Poko; Don Ekwuazi; Nengi Adoki; Bukola Oladipupo; Timini Egbuson
- Cinematography: Femi Awojide
- Edited by: Chinedum Okerengwor
- Music by: Philippe Razol
- Production companies: iFind Pictures; Fiery Film Company Osiris Creatives; Cine9ja 20 Pounds Production
- Release date: 12 August 2021 (Locarno Festival)
- Running time: 84 minutes
- Country: Nigeria
- Language: English

Juju Stories is a three-part anthology film exploring juju (magical) stories rooted in Nigerian folklore and urban legend, written and directed by C.J. Obasi, Abba Makama and Michael Omonua. The film written and directed by the Surreal16 Collective features three stories: "Love Potion" by Omonua, "Yam" by Makama, and "Suffer the Witch" by Obasi. It was released theatrically in Nigeria on 21 January 2022.

== Cast ==
- Belinda Agedah Yanga as Mercy
- Paul Utomi as Leonard
- Elvis Poko as Tohfik
- Don Ekwuazi as Amos
- Nengi Adoki as Joy
- Bukola Oladipupo as Chinwe
- Timini Egbuson as Ikenna
- Seun Kentebe as Laolu
- Sarah Joe as Simi
- Oluwabunmi Sogade as Faith
- Uzoamaka Aniunoh as Upperclass Woman
- Michael O. Ejoor as Upperclass Man
- Eric Nwanso as Edet
- Ebuka Mike Uzoma Abiodun
- Mene Sodjie as Eunice
- Valerie Dish as Deborah
- Rhoda Albert as Patience
- Chisom Coco Ofor as Binta
- Elvis Duke as Ebele
- Donald Ndubuisi as Mark
- Saheed David as Lecturer
- Roseanne Adenuga as Mortician/Madwoman/Beggar

== Plot summary ==
Juju Stories tackles juju in contemporary Lagos through three stories. In "Love Potion" by Omonua, an unmarried woman agrees to use juju to find her ideal mate. In "Yam" by Makama, consequences arise when a street urchin picks up seemingly random money from the roadside. In "Suffer the Witch" by Obasi, love and friendship turn into obsession when a young college woman attracts her crush's interest.

== Reception ==
Juju Stories first premiered at the 2021 edition of the Locarno Film Festival. It won the Boccalino d'Oro award for best film. It is scheduled for theatrical release in 12 countries on 31 October 2021. It was listed as one of the best African films of 2022.

=== Awards and recognition ===
Year	Award	Category	Recipient	Result
2021	Locarno Film Festival	Golden Leopard	Juju Stories	Nominated
2021	Locarno Film Festival	International Competition: Special Mention	Juju Stories	Nominated
2021	Locarno Film Festival	Special Jury Prize	Juju Stories	Nominated
2021	Locarno Film Festival		Juju Stories	Nominated
2021	Locarno Film Festival	Leopard for Best Actress	Juju Stories	Nominated
2021	Locarno Film Festival	Boccalino d'oro for Best Film	Juju Stories	Won
2021	Locarno Film Festival	Leopard for Best Direction	C.J. Obasi, Abba Makama, Michael Omonua	Nominated
