= Under the Influence (TV series) =

Nigerian TV series

- Genre: Drama
- Created by: Wande Thomas
- Written by: Wande Thomas (HW.); Nengi Diri; Mannie Oiseomaye; Nicole Chikwe; Isoken Ogiemwonyi
- Directed by: Wande Thomas
- Starring: Iremide Adeoye; Bobby Ekpe; Funmbi Toye; Dante Okere; Isioma Okey-Nwosu; Eva Ibiam
- Theme music composer: Anwuli Rose
- Country of origin: Nigeria
- Original languages: English; Yoruba
- No. of seasons: 1
- No. of episodes: 13

Production
- Executive producer: Wande Thomas
- Editors: Kolawole Solaja; Adeola Adeoye; Samuel "Phielms" Fidelis
- Running time: 26–36 minutes
- Production company: UrbanGidi Showtime

Original release
- Network: Showmax
- Release: 24 January 2025

Under the Influence is a 2025 Showmax original Nigerian Drama, created and executively produced by Wande Thomas. The series stars Iremide Adeoye, Bobby Ekpe, Isioma Okey-Nwosu, Eva Ibiam, Funmbi Toye, and Dante Okere.

== Series overview ==
Each episode is released once weekly every Friday.

Season	Episodes	Originally released	
Season	Episodes	First released	Last released
1	13	January 24, 2025	April 18, 2025

=== Season 1 (2025) ===
Under the Influence revolves around Dami, the 21-year-old social media influencer whose life changes dramatically after relocating to Lagos. Suddenly in the spotlight, Dami grapples with the pressures of fame while searching for meaning and direction.

== Cast and characters ==
- Iremide Adeoye as Dami
- Bobby Ekpe as Ayo
- Funmbi Toye as Amaka
- Dante Okere as Folarin
- Isioma Okey-Nwosu as Oye
- Eva Ibiam as Ivie
- Idara Peniel Ekaidem as Shade
- Awe Ayobami as Rolex

== Production ==
=== Filming ===
On 12 July 2024, Showmax announced its partnership with UrbanGidi to produce Under the Influence.

=== Casting ===
On 21 January 2025, Showmax unveiled the cast of the series before season 1 began, with a line-up of Iremide Adeoye, Bobby Ekpe, Isioma Okey-Nwosu, Eva Ibiam, Funmbi Toye, and Dante Okere.

== Release ==
The official trailer for the first season was released on 8 January 2025.
