= Tolu Ajayi =

Nigerian poet and writer of fiction

Toluwalogo Ajayi (born 1946) is a Nigerian poet and writer of fiction.

== Biography ==
Born in Ijebu-Ode, Ogun State, Ajayi was educated in Nigeria and the United Kingdom; in the latter country, he qualified in 1970 as a physician at the University of Liverpool Medical School. He also specialized in psychiatry at Memorial University in Newfoundland, Canada.

Most of Ajayi's novels and stories draw on his medical experience.

== Works ==
- The Year (London: Macmillan, 1981). ISBN 0-333-35280-7
- The Lesson (Lagos, Nigeria: Granny Fatima, 1985)
- The Ghost of a Millionaire (Heinemann Educational Books Nigeria, 1990). ISBN 978-129-174-5
- Eyes of the Night, short story collection including his 1990 BBC World Service winning story "Family Planning" (Lagos, Nigeria: Granny Fatima, 1991),
- Images of Lives: Poems for Everyone, poetry collection (Lagos, Nigeria: Granny Fatima, 1991)
- Motions and Emotions: Fumes of Poetic Feelings, poetry collection (Lagos, Nigeria: Granny Fatima, 1993)
- After A Bad Moon: a Sh-to-vel, story collection (Lagos, Nigeria: Granny Fatima, 1995). ISBN 978-33209-1-2
- Over the Bridge (2023 psychological thriller film)
