= Dark October =

2023 Nigerian film

- Directed by: Toka McBaror
- Produced by: Linda Ikeji
- Starring: Chuks Joseph; Munachi Okpara; Kem-Ajieh Ikechukwu; Oriaku Kelechukwu James
- Distributed by: Filmone Production
- Release date: 6 February 2023
- Country: Nigeria

Dark October is a 2023 Nigerian film released to Netflix on 6 February 2023. The film is centered on the lynching of four young students at University of Port Harcourt, popularly known as the Aluu Four lynching. The four were falsely accused of theft in Aluu area of Port Harcourt, Rivers State, Nigeria. The film documents the events that led to their killings and the aftermath of the event.

== Synopsis ==
Based on true events, Dark October tells the story of four university students in Nigeria, who went to a particular area in search of a debtor who owed one of them. Unfortunately, the debtor raised a false alarm and alleged that the boys came to rob him of his valuables; mobs then paraded the boys as thieves and lynched them. The mob attack, however, sparked a nationwide crisis.

== Selected cast ==
- Chuks Joseph as Tizzy
- Munachi Okpara as Big L
- Oriaku Kelechukwu James as Tamuno
- Kem-Ajieh Ikechukwu as Chiboy
- Boman Bognet as Wisdom
- Oge Gabriel as Rachel
- Anichi Chinedu as Vigilante Commander
- Kenechukwu Ezeh as Tall Girl
- Chinelo Ememchukwu as Bola's Friend
- Lorenzo Menakaya as Student Leader
- Anikwe Uju as Tamuno's Sister
- CO2 Official
- Oluchi Awa-Samuel as Big L's Mom
- Uchenna Agbu as Leonard's Uncle
- Uju Anikwe as Tamuno's Sister
- Favour Ben as Lilian
- Ezeh Benedict as Capon
- Prince David as Aboli
- Ikenna Ezeh as Priye
- Chioma Ezeji as Plantain Seller

== Production and release ==
The film is distributed by Filmone Productions and directed by Toka McBaror. Following its release to Netflix on 3 February 2023, the executive producer, Linda Ikeji had said that she hopes that the film will spark a conversation about the dangers of extrajudicial killings and the importance of ensuring justice for all.

== Controversy ==
The parents of the boys who were lynched in the Aluu Four lynching expressed disapproval to the movie and have asked Netflix and Linda Ikeji to suspend the movie explaining that Linda Ikeji did not seek approval from them before proceeding to make movies about their sons.
