= Wakaa! The Musical =

Nigerian musical

Wakaa! The Musical is a Nigerian musical written by Tunde Babalola and produced by Bolanle Austen-Peters. The show follows four young adults after they graduate from university.

== Premise ==
Four young adults, Rex, Kike, Tosan, and Nogzi, all with different backgrounds and experiences, graduate from university and set out to start their adult lives. Kike, the daughter of a wealthy businessman, focuses on living luxuriously rather than pursuing a career. Tosan, who falls in love with Kike, pursues politics, but soon realizes how much corruption is present in the field. Ngozi returns to her village, determined to be an activist who stops child labor and trafficking. Rex travels to England to meet up with his long-distance girlfriend Cassandra and be a dancer on the West End, rather than study to be a doctor like his parents wish. Cassandra turns out to be Bilikisu Kekereekun, a Nigerian man who catfished Rex. Ultimately, Rex is deported, Ngozi's activism takes down corrupt Governor Sagay, Tosan is elected as the new governor, and Kike reignites her relationship with Tosan.

== Productions ==
The show premiered in late 2015 in Nigeria. In early 2016, the show reportedly played to over 10,000 people with over 12 performances in Lagos.

The production ran on the West End at the Shaw Theatre from 21-25 July 2016, making it the first Nigerian musical to be performed in London. All its performances sold out. Due to this success, Austen-Peters expressed interest in taking the show to Broadway.

The show returned to Lagos in April 2017. In September 2017, the show had a week-long run in Abuja.

== Cast ==
Role	2015 Lagos	2016 West End
Rex		Jolomi Amuka
Kike		Arese Emokpae
Tosan	Patrick Diabuah	Patrick Diabuah
Ngozi		Ade Laoye
Ahmed		Segun Dada
Alero		Dolapo Oni
Gov. Otunba Sagay		Bimbo Manuel
Prof. Basuaye	Lord Frank	Paul Adams
Mama Ke		Mawuyon Ogun
Prof. Jojoba	Ozzy Agu	Ozzy Agu
Cletus		Chris Ubani
Kikelomo Johnson	Nengi Adoki	
Bilikisu Kekereekun		

== Reception ==
The musical saw great success in Lagos, consistently reporting sold-out shows and a diverse audience. Reviews praised the show's music, costumes, and choreography, although the story was considered weak by some critics.
