= Maxwell Adam Mahama =

Ghanaian military officer (1985–2017)

Major Maxwell Adam Mahama
- Born: 1985; Ghana
- Died: May 29, 2017 Denkyira-Obuasi, Central Region, Ghana
- Allegiance: Ghana
- Branch: Ghana Armed Forces
- Rank: Major (posthumous)
- Commands: Anti-illegal mining detachment, Denkyira-Obuasi
- Spouse: Barbara Mahama
- Children: 2

Major Maxwell Adam Mahama (1985 – 29 May 2017) was a Ghanaian military officer who served in the Ghana Armed Forces. He became widely known following his death in a mob attack at Denkyira-Obuasi in Ghana's Central Region, an incident that generated nationwide condemnation and sparked renewed debate about mob justice. He was posthumously promoted from Captain to Major by President Nana Addo Dankwa Akufo-Addo.

== Early life and education ==
Mahama was born in 1985 in Ghana. He attended basic and secondary school in Accra before continuing his officer training at the Ghana Military Academy. Information about his early life and training was widely reported after his death as public interest in his background increased.

== Military career ==
Mahama served as an infantry officer in the Ghana Armed Forces and later became commander of a detachment deployed to Denkyira-Obuasi as part of anti-illegal mining (galamsey) operations. Colleagues and superiors described him as disciplined and committed to duty, a portrayal reported widely by local media following the incident.

== Death ==
On 29 May 2017, Mahama was lynched by a mob in Denkyira-Obuasi while jogging near the community where his detachment was stationed. Members of the community reportedly mistook him for an armed robber after noticing his sidearm. Video recordings and photographs of the attack circulated widely online, prompting public outrage and condemnation from government officials, civil society groups, and religious leaders.

Multiple suspects were arrested and prosecuted, and the case became one of the most closely followed criminal trials in Ghana in the years that followed.

== State response and funeral ==
President Akufo-Addo posthumously promoted Mahama to the rank of Major. A state funeral was held on 9 June 2017 at the Forecourt of the State House in Accra.

In response to public calls for support for his family, Parliament passed the Major Mahama Trust Fund Act, 2017 (Act 953), establishing a statutory fund to support his widow and children.

== Legacy ==
Mahama's death intensified national debate about mob justice and due process, leading to widespread public education campaigns and commentary on the need to reform community policing attitudes.

A statue honouring him was later unveiled in Accra as a public reminder of the dangers of mob violence and the importance of rule of law.

== See also ==
- Ghana Armed Forces
- Mob justice
