= Beverly Osu =

Nigerian actress and model (born 1992)

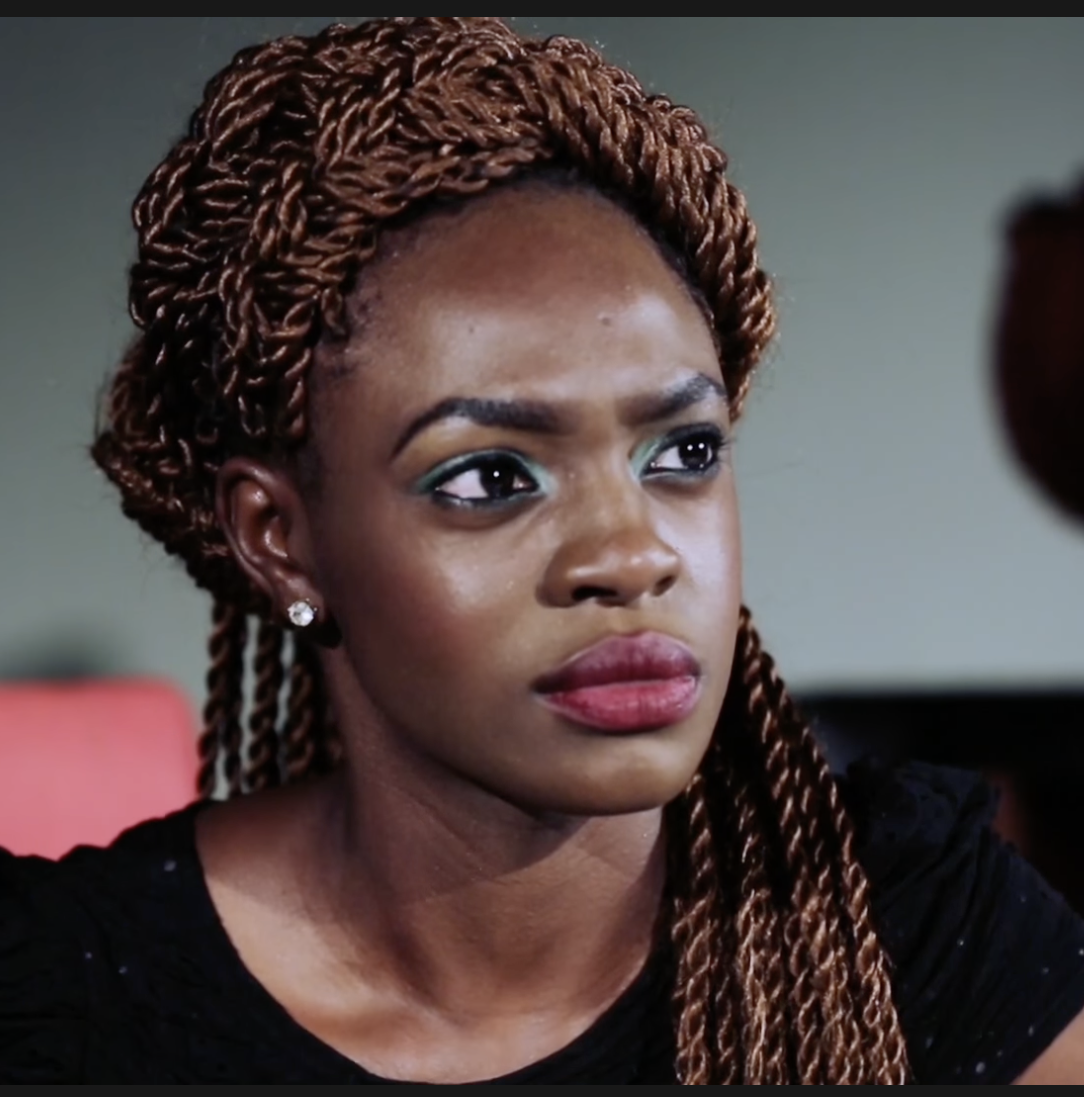
- Born: Beverly Ada Mary Osu; 27 September 1992 (age 33); Lagos State, Nigeria
- Education: Babcock University and National Open University of Nigeria
- Occupations: Actress; Model
- Years active: 2011-present

Beverly Ada Mary Osu // (born 27 September 1992) is a Nigerian video vixen, model and actress. She is predominantly known for her roles in several films and for her participation in the 8th season of Big Brother Africa. Osu won Model of the Year at the 2011 Dynamix All Youth Awards.

== Early life and education ==
Osu, who is originally from Delta State, was born in Lagos State, in southwestern Nigeria. Osu attained her primary education from Daughters of Divine Love Convent, a school located in Enugu State. In a bid to obtain her B.Sc. degree, she applied to Babcock University, where she was granted admission to study mass communication. However, she transferred to the National Open University of Nigeria and earned her mass communication degree there.

== Big Brother Africa (Season 8) ==
In 2013, Osu represented Nigeria in season 8 of Big Brother Africa, becoming the only contestant ever not to have been nominated for possible eviction.

== Career ==
=== Video vixen and modeling career ===
Osu's overall career received mainstream recognition due to her participation in the Big Brother Africa reality TV show but she debuted her career in the Nigerian entertainment industry as a model and in 2011, she won the award for model of the year at the Dynamix awards. Osu as a video vixen has been in the music videos of notable Nigerian musicians most notably appearing in music videos of Ice Prince in the song titled Oleku, Terry da rapman in the song titled Boys are not smiling, Djinee in the song titled Over killing and Kizz Daniel in the song titled Madu.

=== Acting career ===
Osu debuted her acting career a year after the Big Brother Africa season 8 was concluded. Osu in 2014 received her first movie role and was featured in the movie titled Curse Of The Seven where she featured alongside Nollywood actor Ken Erics.

== Awards ==
Osu in 2011, won the Nigerian Top Video Vixen Award at the Dynamix Awards and in the same year won the award for Model of the Year at the Dynamix Awards.

== Personal life ==
At a young age, Osu wanted to become a Reverend sister and enrolled in a convent school in Enugu State. Osu later abandoned this aspiration.

== Filmography ==
=== Films (partial) ===
- Love Notes (2024) as Tami
- The Freedom (2023) as Therapist
- Chief Daddy 2: Going for Broke (2022)
- Palava (2022) as Ehi
- Asake (2022)
- Come Alive (2021) as Judith
- Creepy Lives Here (2021)
- Progressive Tailors Club (2021) as Cynthia
- Unintentional (2021)
- Who's the Boss (2020)
- Nneka The Pretty Serpent (2020) as Tessy Okechukwu
- Zena (2019) as Pohila
- Òlòtūré (2019), as Peju
- A Soldiers Story: Return From The Dead, as Baby
- Your Excellency (2019)
- The Family (2019)
- Chief Daddy (2018), as Sandra Bello
- Black Men Rock (2018) as Cheryl
- Curse of the Seven (2016) as Akunne
- Pepper Soup (2016)
- Ima (2016)
- Stolen Lives (2015)
- Don't Cry for Me (2015)
- Curse Of The Seven (2014)
- Caught in the Act (2014) as Lara

=== Television ===
- Jenifa's Diary - as Mercy
