= Unintentional =

2021 Nigerian film

- Directed by: Olufemi Bamigbetan
- Written by: Zeina Otonjo
- Produced by: Bola Atta; Executive Producer
- Starring: Efa Iwara Omowumi Dada Beverly Osu
- Cinematography: Tobi Karunwi, Tope Molebi
- Edited by: Harry John
- Music by: Dr Bayo Adepetun
- Production company: REDTV (Online TV channel)
- Release date: 26 November 2021
- Running time: 116 minutes
- Country: Nigeria
- Language: English

Unintentional is a 2021 Nigerian romantic drama film directed by Olufemi Bamigbetan, written by Zeina Otonjo and produced by Obinna Okerekeocha, with Bola Atta serving as executive producer. The film stars Efa Iwara, Omowumi Dada and Beverly Osu.

It is the first feature film by United Bank for Africa's lifestyle and entertainment channel, REDTV and was released on YouTube on Boxing Day, 26 December 2021.

== Plot ==
Filmed in Enugu State, Nigeria, the movie delves into the lives of two young African girls on a road trip that leads to the discovery of love in the most expected place. It is a feel-good love story that follows Sefi Madaki and her best friend Rosy on a journey of self-discovery after a tumultuous heartbreak at the start of their National Youth Service year.

== Cast ==
- Efa Iwara as Uzor
- Omowumi Dada as Sefi
- Beverly Osu as Rosy
- Chioma Okoli as Diamond
- Tina Mba as Uzor's Mother
- Kate Henshaw as Sefi's Mother
- Mike Uchegbu as Adams
- Frank Donga as Hotel Porter
- Tobi Bakre as Ladi
- Dominic Alonge as Deejay
- Owen Agudiegwu as Bus Driver
- Eso Dike as Chris
- Jessie Etim-Inyang as Hanna
- Ifeanyi Michael as Taxi Driver
- Kaleb Iyoha as Kaynan
- Clement Moses as Keke Driver

== Release ==
The official trailer for Unintentional was released on 20 December 2021 and the film premiered on YouTube on Boxing Day, 26 December 2021.

== Awards and nominations ==
Year	Award	Category	Recipient	Result	Ref
2023	Africa Magic Viewers' Choice Awards	Best Actor In A Comedy Drama, Movie Or TV Series	Kunle Idowu	Nominated	

== See also ==
- List of Nigerian films of 2021
