= Makemation =

2025 Nigerian film

- Directed by: Michael Akinrogunde
- Written by: Toyosi Akerele-Ogunsiji; Nengi Diri
- Produced by: Toyosi Akerele-Ogunsiji
- Starring: Jide Kosoko; Shaffy Bello; Ibrahim Chatta; Tomi Ojo
- Music by: Tolu Obanro
- Production company: Rise Interactive Studios
- Distributed by: Nile Media Entertainment Group
- Release date: 18 April 2025
- Running time: 2 hours 19 minutes
- Country: Nigeria

Makemation is a 2025 Nigerian AI-tech themed family film produced by Toyosi Akerele-Ogunsiji The film was theatrically released on 18 April 2025. It stars Richard Mofe-Damijo, Shaffy Bello, Tomi Ojo, Yvonne Jegede, Tony Umez and Jide Kosoko. The film is Toyosi Akerele-Ogunsiji's debut production and is described as the first feature film on artificial intelligence in Nigeria that tells the story of a brilliant young girl in rural Lagos, Nigeria, who uses her tech knowledge to navigate the challenges she and her family face in the world.

Following its release, Makemation grossed ₦32.9 million within its first four days of release.

== Synopsis ==
Makemation is Africa’s first feature film that places artificial intelligence and frontier technologies at the heart of a coming-of-age story delivered with cinematic brilliance and broad emotional appeal. Set in rural Lagos, Nigeria, the film follows the transformative journey of a brilliant but underprivileged young girl whose courage and creativity ignite change in her life and community. Through an inspiring and family-friendly narrative, Makemation balances humour, drama, and heartfelt moments to captivate audiences of all ages. The film explores powerful and timely themes, including girl-child education, access to STEM education and digital skills, renewable energy, youth empowerment, inclusion and diversity, equitable healthcare access driven by local, home-grown innovation, and the fast-rising role of young Africans, particularly girls, in leveraging technology to solve real-world problems. With an emphasis on storytelling, visual excellence, and social impact, Makemation champions the boundless potential of youth-led innovation in Africa and beyond. [7][8]

== Cast ==
- Richard Mofe-Damijo as Chief Abiye Douglas
- Shaffy Bello as Professor Aarin Orazulike
- Tomi Ojo as Zara Sodangi
- Yvonne Jegede as Zanzi Whenu
- Tony Umez as Dr. Layi Jejelaiye
- Chioma Chukwuka Akpotha as Ginika Sodangi
- Jide Kosoko as Dieko Awosika
- Chuks Joseph as Divine Douglas
- Adeoluwa Akintoba as Babajide Gomez
- Ali Nuhu as Football Coach Gyang
- Wumi Toriola as Sidi

== Release and distribution ==
The film was first premiered at a special viewing hosted at the residence of the US Consul General in Lagos on the 6th of September 2024, then at the 2024 Global Artificial Intelligence Summit in Saudi Arabia and at the Kenya Innovation week in November 2024. The Governor of Lagos State Babajide Sanwo-Olu hosted an event to unveil the film on 9 March 2025.

On 9 April 2025, the film was presented to Crown Princess Victoria of Sweden at the UNDP AI marketplace, and was then released to the general public on 18 April 2025 by Nile Entertainment, who is the distributor.
