= A Naija Christmas =

2021 Nigerian film

- Directed by: Kunle Afolayan
- Starring: Abayomi Alvin; Kunle Remi; Efa Iwara; Rachel Oniga
- Distributed by: Netflix
- Release date: December 16, 2021
- Running time: 121 minutes
- Country: Nigeria
- Language: English

A Naija Christmas is a 2021 Nigerian Christmas film directed by Kunle Afolayan and starring Abayomi Alvin, Kunle Remi, Efa Iwara and Rachel Oniga. The film was released on Netflix on December 16, 2021. It is the first Nigerian Christmas film on Netflix.

== Plot ==
A Naija Christmas tells the story of an ageing mother who is distraught because her sons have refused to get married and give her grandchildren. She challenges them by offering the first son to marry her Ikoyi house as his inheritance.

Ajike is recording in the studio when Ugo walks in with a date. She hides and observes while Ugo teases his date. Some other women rush in and wreak havoc in the studio because Ugo cheated on them. Outside, he sees that his car has also been destroyed. Mama hosts a meeting with the ladies of undiluted destiny, but she is mocked for not being a grandmother. Meanwhile, Obi proposes to Vera amidst pomp and pageantry. Vera walks off. Mama sees the live stream of Obi's proposal, she faints and is rushed to the hospital. Mama berates her sons for not getting married. She informs them that the first amongst them to marry was going to inherit her house. Tony Torpedo, a loan shark visits Ugo to reclaim his funds. In a bid to find a partner, Ugo reaches out to his old flames to no avail. Obi approaches Vera at work. She urges him to make her happy by creating a great pitch in order to win her back. Mama takes her sons to church to search for a "good" girl. Ugo meets Ajike, a chorister and offers her a free studio session. In order to earn Ajike's affection, Ugo volunteers as a church drummer. The ladies of destiny host the Christmas gala in Mushin but mama Agatha is unable to attend because she was called into hospital. Obi pitches an idea to the cable company around the ghetto gala which they like. In turn, Vera proposes a date night. Chike and Ajike try to explain to the Mushin locals the idea of the grotto. Ajike records a demo in Ugo's studio and invited him to an all night event. Ugo goes home to see that some more of his furniture has been taken. Meanwhile, Chike is seen in bed with one of Mama's women of destiny, Sammy. Turns out the all night event Ugo was invited to was a church vigil. Ajike comforts Ugo after he is beaten by Javelin. He asks her on a date. Vera asks Obi to marry her at their office party. This visibly upsets Kaneng and she lies that she's back with her boyfriend. Kaneng and Obi make out. Ugo and Ajike finally go on an actual date. Obi tells Vera he cannot marry her because he wants Kaneng. She gives him a dirty slap. It turns out that Tony Torpedo is Kanengs ex-boyfriend. He pays Obi a visit and warns him to leave Kaneng alone. Chike goes to Sammy's house and is shocked to find her husband there. He leaves disappointed. Ajike gets drunk and leads a worship session in the night club. She wakes up in Ugo's flat. Ugo proposes a relationship with Ajike and she tells him that their relationship has to be sanctioned by the church. The church interviews him and warned against intimacy before marriage. Obi propositions Kaneng but he his met by Javelin and taken to Torpedo who demands payment for the emotional damage to the tune of the amount owed by Ugo. Ugo is visited by his brothers who express surprise at his missing furniture. Ugo challenges Ajike about her relationship with Tony Torpedo and this visibly upsets her. She says she knew Tony from childhood in Mushin and only went to meet with him to plead on Ugo's behalf. Tony returns Ugo's furniture. Kaneng and Obi make up. It is re revealed that Obi paid Tony off. Obi takes Kaneng to the family Christmas party and mama approved of her. Ugo is surprised by Ajike at the party and they make up.

== Cast ==
- Abayomi Alvin as Chike
- Kunle Remi as Ugo
- Efa Iwara as Obi
- Rachel Oniga as Madam Agatha/Mama
- Linda Osifo as Vera
- Segilola Ogidan as Ajike
- Lateef Adedimeji as Tony Torpedo
- Uzoamaka Aniunoh as Cassie
- Ade Laoye as Kaneng
- Mercy Johnson Okojie as Mrs. Bliss (Sammy)
- Carol King as Deaconess Fakorede
- Bayode Agbi as Cable Company Boss
- Onikosi Bukola Abisoye as Gym lady
- Soledayo Adegbite as Amos
- Temitope Olaiwola as Taxi Driver
- Alabi Pasuma as Special Gala Artiste
- Imoikor Joseph as Pastor
- Joseph Jaiyeoba as Javelin

== Reception ==
In a review for The New York Times, Lisa Kennedy wrote "With naughty nods made nice by a few twists, 'A Naija Christmas' might seem to be an entertaining albeit middle-of-the-road holiday romantic comedy. Only that road cuts through Lagos, Nigeria." Kunle Afolayan earned praise for his directing.

== See also ==
- List of Christmas films
