= The Men's Club (Nigerian web series) =

Nigerian comedy webseries

- Created by: Tola Odunsi
- Starring: Ayoola Ayolola; Baaj Adebule; Efa Iwara; Daniel Etim-Effiong; Shaffy Bello; Sola Sobowale; Sharon Ooja; Adebukola Oladipupo; Mimi Chaka; Enado Odigie
- Country of origin: Nigeria
- Original language: English
- No. of seasons: 5
- No. of episodes: 60 + 3 special episodes

Production
- Executive producer: Tola Odunsi
- Producers: Bola Atta; Akin Akinkugbe; Tola Odunsi)
- Production locations: Lagos, Lagos State, Nigeria
- Production company: Urban Vision

Original release
- Network: RedTV (seasons 1–3 + 3 special holiday episodes); Prime Video (season 4–present)
- Release: October 2018 – present

Related
- Assistant Madams

The Men's Club, popularly known as TMC, is a Nigerian web series created and directed by Tola Odunsi. It was first released in October 2018 on REDTV's youtube channel. The show stars Ayoola Ayolola, Baaj Adebule, Efa Iwara, and Daniel Etim-Effiong in the lead roles and Sola Sobowale, Shaffy Bello, Sharon Ooja, Adebukola Oladipupo, Mimi Chaka, Enado Odigie and many others in supporting roles. After the completion of season 3, RED TV announced an addendum special edition to the show, "The Men's Club Holiday Special", which consisted of three different editions aired on Christmas Day, Boxing Day and New Year's Day.

== Premise ==
The Men's Club' revolves around four male main characters and how they relate with their partners and the ordeals that they face in their everyday life.

== Selected cast ==
- Ayoola Ayolola as Aminu Garba (Season 1-3)
- Pere Egbi as Aminu Garba (Season 4)
- Baaj Adebule as Louis Okafor
- Daniel Etim-Effiong as Lanre Taiwo
- Sharon Ooja as Jasmine
- Shaffy Bello as Mrs Teni Doregos
- Sola Sobowale as Mama Jasmine
- Adebukola Oladipupo as Tiara Bewaji
- Efa Iwara as Tayo Oladapo
- Mimi Chaka as Tumini
- Nengi Adoki as Lola Doregos
- Enado Odigie as Hadiza
- Segilola Ogidan as Tonye
- Okusaga Adeoluwa as Kash (Season 5)
- Paul Nnadiekwe as Toks (Season 5)
- Chuks Joseph as Francis (Season 5)
- David Eyo as Obinna (Season 5)

== Exit of Ayoola Ayolola ==
In 2021, Tola Odunsi, the director, announced that Ayolola would no longer be playing the lead role of Aminu Garba via an Instagram post as he was unavailable to play the role. He was to be replaced by the former Big Brother Naija housemate, Pere Egbi. Due to speculation that he relocated without notifying the show runners, Ayolola reacted to the announcent via his Instagram page writing “Contrary to what was said, I did not relocate without letting the executive producers and producers of the show know, My decision to make a ‘temporary’ move out of the country was a long thought out process in which the producer/my manager at the time was aware of and involved in. With that being said, I cannot wait to be back on your screens again."

== Award and recognition ==
The Men's Club won the Gage Award for the best web series of 2020 on April 24, 2021. The show also was named the best African series at the HAP Awards (Hollywood & African Prestigious Awards) 2021. Ayoola Ayolola and Sharon Ooja also won awards for best actor and best supporting actor respectively.
