= Linda Ikeji =

Nigerian blogger (born 1980)

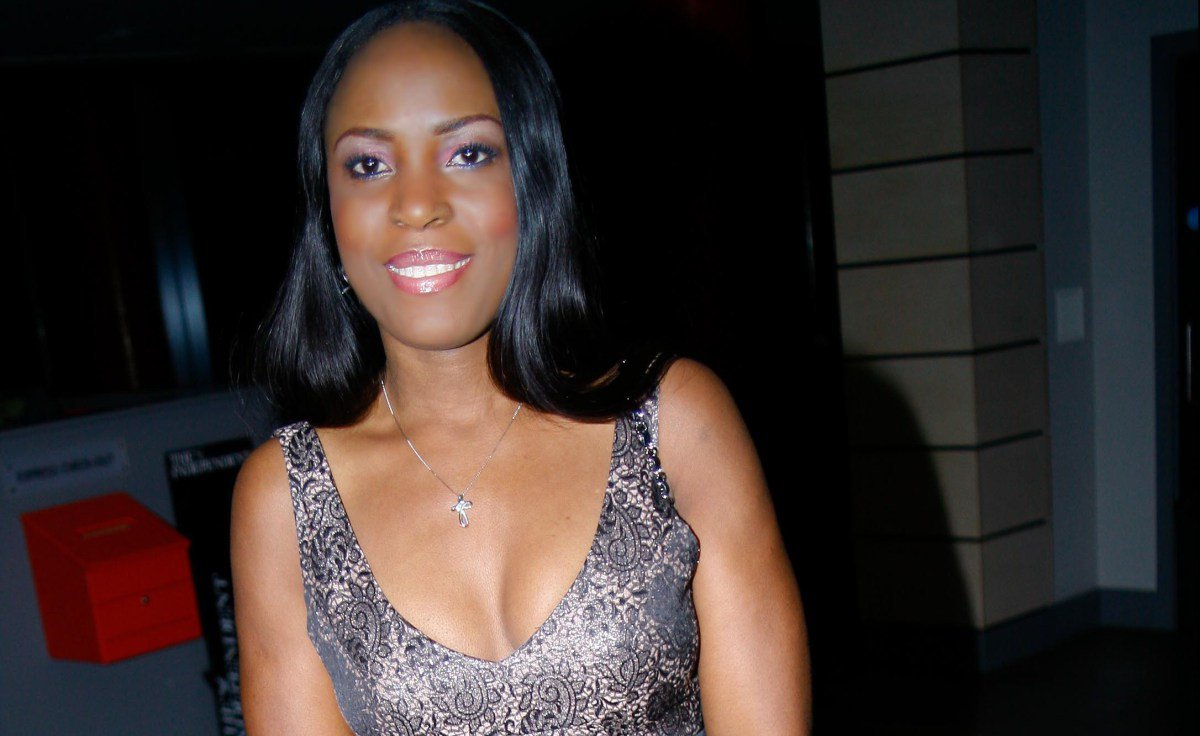
- Born: Linda Ifeoma Ikeji; Nkwerre, Imo, Nigeria
- Occupations: Blogger; entrepreneur; writer
- Relatives: Laura Ikeji (sister)
- Website: lindaikejisblog.com

Linda Ifeoma Ikeji (born 19 September 1980), is a Nigerian blogger, writer, entrepreneur, and former model. She is known for her blog and controversial online publications.

== Early life and education ==
Ikeji was born and raised in a Catholic family in Nkwerre, Imo State, Southeast Nigeria. She is the second child. She began writing at the age of 10. She completed her secondary school education at the age of 17 and at 18, enrolled at the University of Lagos, where she studied English language. To assist her family and support herself through school, she held part-time jobs as a waitress, model, and writer.

Ikeji graduated from the university in 2004. In 2006, she started blogging as a hobby. At that time, the internet was not as prominent in Nigeria, and she had to make her posts at a cybercafé.

== Professional career ==
Ikeji started blogging in 2006. She became an active blogger in 2007 using the Blogger sub-domain 'lindaikeji.blogspot.com' and later obtained her own domain, 'www.lindaikejisblog.com'. She also ventured into online radio broadcasting. The station is operated from the Linda Ikeji Media Office. Some of its programmes are broadcast live on Linda Ikeji TV.

Ikeji also opened a music platform known as LindaIkeji Music which was launched on 21 November 2016, but it became dormant three months after the launch. She introduced a social networking platform named Linda Ikeji Social, operating on the domain name LindaIkejiSocial.com.

Ikeji runs a non-profit project themed "I'd rather be self-made; No thanks". In her interview with HipTV, she revealed that through the project, she assists young girls aged 16–25 who have great business ideas and are willing to venture into entrepreneurship. She gave out the sum of ₦10,000,000 in Phase 1 of the project.

In 2023, Ikeji made her debut into the Nigerian film production, by producing her first movie titled Dark October which told the story of the Aluu Four lynching.

== Recognition ==
In August 2012, Forbes Africa dedicated itself to celebrating African women in that month's issue. In that issue, Forbes profiled Africa's 20 Most Prominent Women and the issue featured profiles on two young Nigerian women: Linda Ikeji, as well as Chibundu Onuzo. The name Linda Ikeji was the most searched item by users of Google in Nigeria.

Ikeji was interviewed by BBC on their Focus on Africa programme. The interview aired on 25 September 2012.

On 8 August 2018, Linda Ikeji was among eminent personalities drawn from different countries across multiple disciplines who were conferred with Honorary Doctorate Degree from Trinity International University in Georgia for her outstanding job in Business and Media in Africa. Others conferred includes Steve Egboro, Nigerian filmmaker and event manager, Chairman Daily Times Newspaper, Dr. Fidelis Anosike, Dr. Obeahon Ohiwerei, GMD/ CEO of Keystone Bank Limited, renowned lawyer Mike Ozekhome and few others.

== Controversies ==
Ikeji has dealt with controversial posts which include the #SaveMayowa Campaign and also about celebrities such as Funke Akindele, Richard Mofe Damijo, Djimon Hounsou, Wizkid and Tonto Dikeh. She also made controversial publications about politician Doyin Okupe who described the publications as defamatory.

Ikeji's blog was shut down on 8 October 2014 but restored on 10 October 2014 around midnight by Google for undisclosed reasons. Taiwo Kola-Ogunlade, Google's West Africa spokesperson, said: "We take violations of policies very seriously as such activities diminish the experience for our users. When we are notified of the existence of content that may violate our Terms of Service, we act quickly to review it and determine whether it actually violates our policies. If we determine that it does, we remove it immediately."

Ikeji revealing that she was pregnant was quite controversial as several ladies who looked up to her were disappointed at the fact that she preached celibacy and went ahead to get pregnant out of wedlock.

In 2018, the online editor for the Punch Newspaper, John Abayomi, threatened to file a lawsuit against Ikeji for an untrue story about him being the owner of instablog9ja. He also claimed the publication put his life and that of his family in danger.

== Personal life ==
Ikeji says she and her son's father Sholaye Jeremi are not suitable partners. She took to her blog to detail reasons why her relationship with her son's father, whom she met in December 2015, didn't work out as expected.

== Honours and awards ==
Awards	Year	Category
Nigeria Blog Awards NBA	2013	Best Entertainment Blog
Nigerian Broadcasters Merit Awards	2013	Website/blog of the year

== See also ==
- List of Nigerian bloggers
- List of Igbo people
