= Payday (2018 film) =

2018 Nigerian comedy drama film

- Film poster
- Directed by: Cheta Chukwu
- Produced by: Orwi Manny Ameh
- Starring: Baaj Adebule; Bisola Aiyeola; Zack Orji; Victor Ebiye; Segilola Ogidan; Meg Otanwa; Orwi Manny Ameh
- Cinematography: Laja Pelumi
- Edited by: Ibrahim Salami
- Music by: Sasikumar B. Jonathon Fessenden
- Production company: Shire Productions
- Release date: 13 July 2018
- Running time: 110 min
- Country: Nigeria
- Language: English
- Budget: $50,000

Payday is a 2018 Nigerian comedy drama film directed by Cheta Chukwu and produced by Orwi Manny Ameh with Kingsley Chukwu and Orwi Manny Ameh as its executive producers. The film stars Baaj Adebule, Bisola Aiyeola, Zack Orji, Victor Ebiye, Segilola Ogidan and Meg Otanwa. It was released on 13 July 2018 and premiered on Netflix on November 29, 2019.

== Plot ==
The film is about two best friends, Paul and Ortega, whose landlord died just before their annual rent was due. Without a landlord to pay rent to, the pair decided to have some fun with the money; unfortunately, the landlord had a daughter, Yemisola, who informs them that they will be evicted if they do not pay their rent within 24 hours. Paul and Ortega find themselves in a race against time to earn enough money to pay their rent.

== Cast ==
- Baaj Adebule as Paul
- Victor Ebiye as Ortega
- Orwi Manny Ameh as Barrister Patrick
- Zack Orji as Mr. Afolayan
- Bisola Aiyeola as Ngozi
- Meg Otanwa as Kimberley
- Segilola Ogidan as Yemisola Bankole
- Kingsley Chukwu as Joe (voice)
- Karim Davis as Doctor (voice)
- Mawuli Gavor as Orlando
- Samuel Imo as Rapper
- Phoenix Ifeoma as Paul's ex-girlfriend
