= No Way Through =

2023 action drama film

- Directed by: Chinaza Onuzo
- Screenplay by: Sheila Menon, Alexandra Bouillon
- Produced by: Chinaza Onuzo, Andrew Noble, Mak Vincent
- Music by: James Edward Barker
- Production company: Inkblot Productions
- Distributed by: Amazon Prime Video
- Release date: 2023
- Country: Nigeria

No Way Through is a 2023 action drama film directed by Chinaza Onuzo. The film was produced by Inkblot Productions, and had its theatrical release on 8 December 2023.

== Plot ==
No Way Through delves into the compelling journey of Jolade Okeniyi, a single mother facing the challenges of providing for her teenage daughter. The narrative unfolds as Jolade navigates the complexities of life, portraying themes of resilience, determination, and the unbreakable bond between a mother and her child. Jolade's precarious financial situation leads her to work as a driver for the local drug cartel, becoming entangled in a dangerous world where survival means making unimaginable choices.

== Cast ==
- Chidi Mokeme as Pastor
- Chioma Akpota as Deaconess Rebecca
- Ikechukwu Onunaku as Christian Ezechime
- Funke Akindele as Jolade Okeniyi
- Roberta Oroma as Ejide
- David Avery as Soldier
- Michael Parr as Soldier1
- Tim Plester as Rob
- Amy Loughton as Amy
- Nengi Adoki as Margret
- Seun Ajayi as Jude Nwafor
- Junior Pope as Lotanna
- Eso Dike as Bolasco
- Adekanla Desalu as Jayjay
- Sheggz Olusemo
