= Toyosi Akerele-Ogunsiji =

Nigerian AI for Development Professional

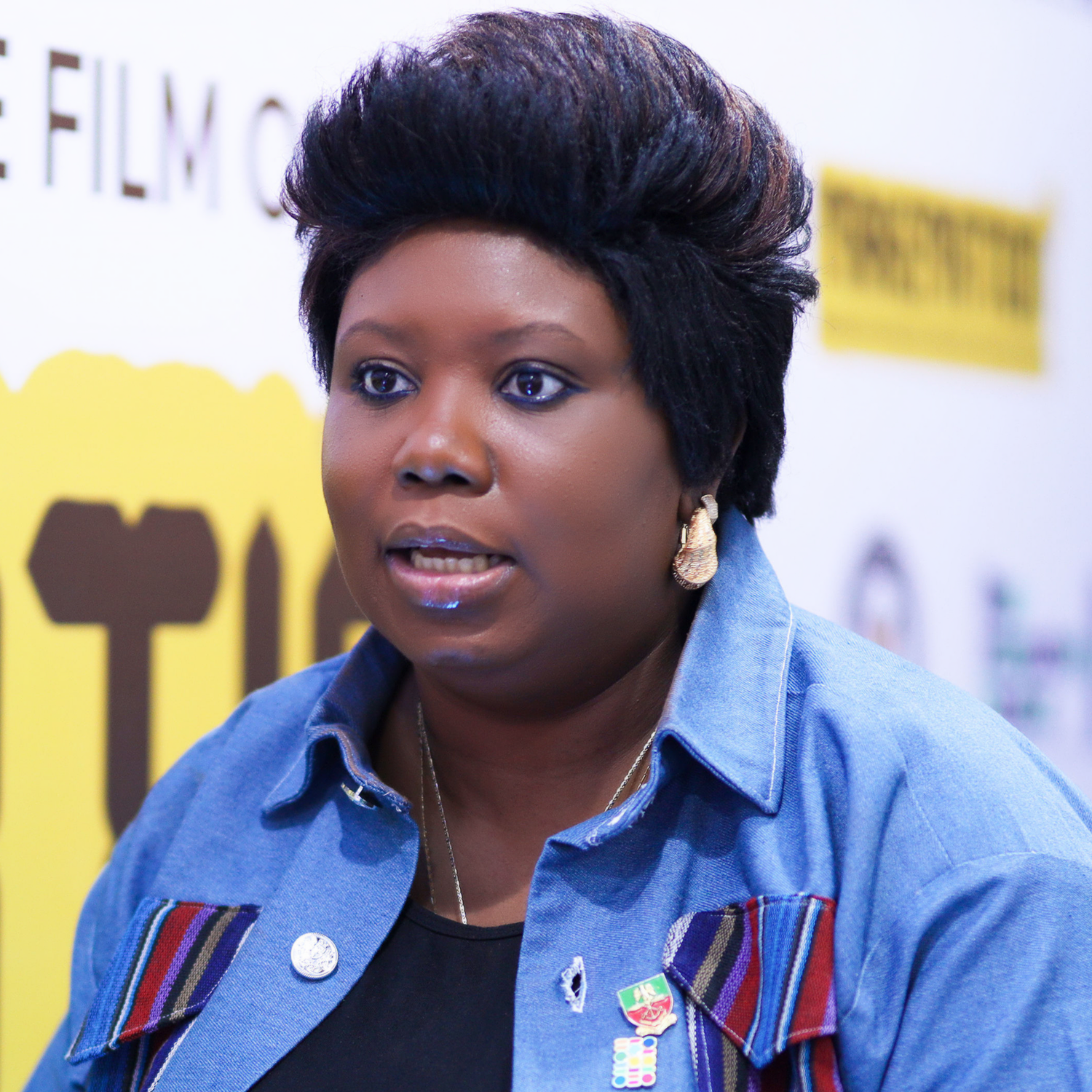
- Born: Oluwatoyosi Akerele; 8 November; Lagos State, Nigeria
- Education: Cambridge University; Judge Business School
- Occupation: AI for Development Professional
- Notable work: The founder and CEO of Rise Networks
- Website: risenetworks.org

Toyosi Akerele-Ogunsiji (born Oluwatoyosi Akerele, 8 November) is a Nigerian Artificial Intelligence for Development Professional (AI4Dev) whose passionate career focuses on AI Safety and Governance, Media, Public Policy Advisory and e-learning and has seen her evolve into a highly sought after, revered global thought leader and specialist within her fields of expertise. She is the founder and CEO of Rise Networks, a Lagos-based data and AI for development social enterprise, and founder of Rise Interactive Studios, the production company behind Makemation, Africa's first feature film on Artificial Intelligence scheduled to be screened at an exclusive side event of the 80th United Nations General Assembly and the Global Citizens Festival in New York. The film has been positioned as a vehicle for sparking conversations on gender and inclusivity, the role of artificial intelligence and technology in the Global South, and approaches to addressing Africa’s most pressing development challenges. Toyosi Akerele-Ogunsiji serves on international AI policy and convening platforms and has been recognised by organisations such as SwissCognitive and the Aspen Global Leadership Network for her work in AI, governance and youth development. and named by Forbes as one of the 20 most Powerful Young Women in African.

She co-produced Africa's first feature film Makemation which uses tech innovation including Artificial Intelligence.

== Early life and education ==
Akerele-Ogunsiji was born to the family of James Ayodele and Felicia Mopelola Akerele in Lagos State, Nigeria. She attended Ebun Oluwa Nursery and Primary School, Oregun Lagos from where she headed to Lagos State Model College Kankon Badagry, Lagos for her Junior Secondary Education from 1994 to 1996 before proceeding to Egbado College (now Yewa College) from 1998 till June 2000 for her Senior Secondary Education where she graduated as the best Student in the Essay Competition organised by the Aionian Group of Schools in Ogun State. She obtained a Second Class Upper Degree in Civil Law from the University of Jos in April 2007. Akerele-Ogunsiji is A Mason Fellow and Mid Career Master in Public Administration alumnus of the Harvard University Kennedy School of Government.

She studied Strategic Management at Executive Level at Cambridge University’s Judge Business School, obtained a Certificate in Youth Inclusive Financial Services from University of New Hampshire, Durham, United States, holds a Certificate in Media Enterprise from the School of Media and Communication, Pan Atlantic University and an Executive Masters’ Certificate in Project Management from The Project Management College, UK. She has also studied Digital Marketing Strategy at the UK Institute of Digital Marketing and she received a 2nd Class UPPER bachelor’s degree in civil law from the University of Jos.

In 2025, she became a PhD Fellow at the Nigerian Defense Academy researching on the intersection of Defense and Digital Transformation and their implications on National and Economic Security.

== Professional career ==
Akerele-Ogunsiji started her career in 2007 as a Corporate Communications and External Affairs Executive at Oando Oil and Gas PLC. She moved on to the Ministry of Youths and Social Development, Ogun State, Nigeria where she was the Special Assistant to the Honourable Commissioner on Youth Development before going on to establish Rise Human And Education Development Networks, an organisation that focuses on creating intellectual development and capacity building programs for young Nigerians between 16 and 30.

Akerele-Ogunsiji founded Passnownow in 2012 with the aim of helping indigent and deprived secondary school children to access and use Curriculum Compliant Education Content, from the comfort of Mobile Devices. She also founded, Printmagicng, a Printing firm that delivers 24 hours Printing Service at low cost to Small Businesses via the Internet.

in 2017, Toyosi Akerele-Ogunsiji led international students of the Harvard Kennedy School of Government and Massachusetts Institute of Technology (MIT) to a one-week Public Sector and Innovation Field Trip in, Lagos, Nigeria. The trip was described as providing "a veritable platform for Engagement for Harvard Students and Faculty to learn more about Urban Development and Innovation, Economic Competitiveness, Democratic Governance and emerging Trends in the Public Policies of Lagos and Nigeria."

== AI for development, policy and advisory work ==
Under her leadership Rise Networks has represented Nigeria on international AI policy and safety platforms. The organisation attended the inaugural UK AI Safety Summit in November 2023, and Toyosi Akerele-Ogunsiji has been invited to and spoken at several international AI events, including the Global Artificial Intelligence Summit in Riyadh (2022) and ITU/AI for Good programming.

She has served on multi-stakeholder advisory groups focused on AI in development, including membership of a UNDP AI4Dev reference initiative in Nigeria.

== Publications ==
Toyosi Akerele-Ogunsiji had several papers and publications on leadership, youth and business development, including authoring:

- Strate-Tricks: strategies and tricks, the winning formula for emerging businesses
- We Have to Belong: Why the Poor Majority of my Rich Country cannot wait anymore which was launched at the Center for Public Leadership, Harvard Kennedy School in May 2017.

Her writings and interviews have been published in The Nation, the Nigerian Guardian, The Punch and This Day newspapers.

== Awards, appointments and recognition ==
- Selected as one of 101 Young African Leaders by the African Business Forum in 2007
- Alumni of the Prestigious International Visitor Leadership Program of the United States Government
- Recognition by Crans Montana Forum in Europe as a New Leader of Tomorrow
- Recipient of This Day Awards for Nigeria's Women of Distinction
- Young Entrepreneur of the Year 2011 of Success Digest Entrepreneurial Awards
- Recipient of the 2011 Excellence Awards of the School of Media and Communication, Pan African University
- Recipient of the 2008 Future Africa Awards Best Use of Advocacy Category and the Nigerian Youth Leadership Awards jointly organized by Leap Africa, International Youth Foundation and NOKIA.
- One of the honorees’ of the Top 100 Young Leaders’ Recognition at the Nigeria's Centenary Celebrations by the Federal Government.
- Honoured by 234 GIVE, a Social Initiative that encourages Nigerians to donate to the adopted Charities and improve livelihoods for the less privileged.
- In May 2010, Toyosi was selected for the Nigeria Leadership Initiative's Future Leaders Fellowship. NLI is a member of the Aspen Global Leadership Network.
- Member of The Right to Know Initiative, a Nonprofit focused on Human Rights and Open Data Issues and their social impact on Citizens in 2011
- Appointed the Youngest Member of the Victims of Terrorism Funds Committee.
- Jury Member of the Get Started Africa Entrepreneurship Challenge initiated by NESCAFÉ to empower Youth across the Continent
- Member and a Mentor of the African Entrepreneurship Awards & a Mentor on the Bank of Africa's Africa Entrepreneurship Awards
- Named on the 2015 Honours List of Genevieve Magazine's Top 21 most Outstanding Nigerian Women and in 2016 as one of Nigeria's youngest achievers under 35.

She has delivered Papers and presentations as well as led focused group discussions at the Nigerian Economic Summit Group, Women in Management, Business and Public Sector, Youth Africamp organized annually by Open Society Institute of East Africa, Women of West African Entrepreneurship, Africa Wide Consultation on Post 2015 Development Agenda and Expert Group Meeting, and the United Nations Media Workshop on Africa Governance Report.

Toyosi Akerele-Ogunsiji was in June 2011 described by Michelle Obama, then First Lady of the United States, as one of her personal inspirations in a televised address to America as a prelude to her arrival in Africa for the Young African Women Leaders Forum of which Akerele-Ogunsiji remains the only Nigerian member to date. In 2014, Forbes named Akerele-Ogunsiji as one of the 20 most Powerful Young Women in Africa. In the same year, she was also nominated for the MTV Africa Music Awards.

== See also ==
- Ade Olufeko
- Obi Asika
- Ade Hassan
