= Abba Makama =

Nigerian creative director, visual artist and filmmaker

Abba T. Makama
- Born: Jos, Plateau
- Other name: Abba Tadurikini Makama
- Education: State University of New York at Fredonia, New York University
- Notable work: Green White Green, The Lost Okoroshi
- Parent(s): Samu'ila and Julie Makama

Abba T. Makama is a Nigerian writer, director, visual artist and producer. He is known for directing Green White Green and The Lost Okoroshi. He is the founder and the creative director of Osiris Film and Entertainment. His films focus on telling Nigerian stories to a global audience and illustrate how connected and similar the world is regardless of national boundaries. His work is largely inspired by dreams and Jung's theory of the collective unconscious. His work also explores theme of classism, spirituality, tradition and in genres such as comedy, drama, mockumentary, satire and magical realism.

Abba is a co-founding member of the Surreal16 collective. Inspired by the Danish cinema movement Dogme 95, Surreal16 was born from a mutual admiration by three Nigerian filmmakers (Makama, C.J Obasi and Micheal Omonua). They became disillusioned by the abundance of slapstick comedies and wedding films. The Collective set out to diversify output and encourage a new type of cinema. The collective wrote a manifesto containing sixteen rules and guidelines that govern the making of their films. The rules were announced during a panel at Africa International Film Festival 2017 after the screening of their first anthology film Visions. In 2021 Abba and the collective founded the S16 Film Festival, a platform for the new wave of African cinema that speaks the universal vocabulary of film.

Juju Stories is three-part anthology film exploring juju (magical) stories rooted in Nigerian folklore and urban legend. Abba directed the second segment called "YAM".

== Early life ==
Abba Makama was born in Jos, Plateau State as the third child of Samu'ila and Julie Makama. He obtained his first degree in Business Management from the State University of New York at Fredonia, and studied film at New York University.

== Recognition ==
In 2015, his 2014 documentary movie about Nollywood was premiered on Aljazeerah and was nominated for African Movie Academy Awards. In the same year, his Party of Minister was screened at Black Star Film festival in Philadelphia, USA. Green White Green and The Lost Okoroshi were screened at Toronto International Film Festival. While the former won the best Nigerian movie at the 2016 Africa International Film Festival, the latter got screened at the 2019 BFI London Film Festival and Berlin Critics Week in 2020.Juju Stories had its world premiere at the Locarno Film Festival Switzerland 2021 where it won the Boccalino d'Oro award for best film. Juju Stories also won best director at African International Film Festival 2021.

== Filmography ==
- Party of Minister (short film) (2013)
- Nollywood: Something From Nothing (2015)
- Green White Green (2016)
- Visions: Shaitan (2017)
- The Lost Okoroshi (2019)
- Juju stories: Yam (2021)
