= C. J. Obasi =

Nigerian film director, screenwriter and editor

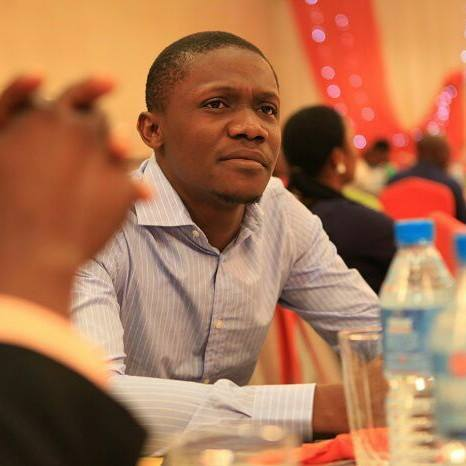
- Other names: C. J. "Fiery" Obasi, "Fiery", "The Fiery One"
- Education: University of Nigeria
- Occupations: Film director, screenwriter, editor
- Years active: 2011–present
- Awards: Best Nigerian film, trailblazer of the year award
- Website: www.afieryfilm.com

C. J. Obasi (also known as "Fiery" or "The Fiery One") is a Nigerian film director, screenwriter and editor.

His debut feature – a zero budget film Ojuju premiered at the Africa International Film Festival in November 2014, and won the award for Best Nigerian Film. It also got him the Trailblazer of the Year award in March 2015, at the Africa Magic Viewers' Choice Awards (AMVCA).

His third feature, Mami Wata, premiered at the 2023 Sundance Film Festival and won the Special Jury Prize in the World Dramatic Competition for the film's cinematography.[1]

== Early life and career ==
Born in the city of Owerri, the capital city of Imo State, Nigeria, Obasi grew up watching Hammer Horror films, reading Stephen King novels and watching film adaptations of his work. He watched classic films and his favorite superheroes and villains, and recreated them in hand-drawn comic books.

After attending the Government Secondary School, Owerri, Obasi studied computer science at the University of Nigeria, Nsukka (UNN), Enugu State, southeastern Nigeria. In 2012, he set up Fiery Film Company, with his wife, the TV and film producer, Oge Obasi and the late screenwriter Benjamin Stockton.

Obasi's directorial debut came in 2014 with Ojuju, a zombie thriller film. The movie was screened in various festivals around the world, including the Pan African Film Festival in Los Angeles, Shockproof Film Festival in Prague, New Voices in Black Film Festival in New York, Nollywood Week Festival in Paris, Fantasia Film Festival in Montreal, Africa International Film Festival where it won the award of the Best Nigerian Film and others. It received praise from The Hollywood Reporter for its "well-drawn characters and pungently compelling situations".

His second film, O-Town, was released in 2015 to critical acclaim. A crime thriller, O-Town, also written by Obasi, tells the tale of a small town mired in crime. O-Town was inspired by Owerri, the place where Obasi was born.

In 2018, Obasi directed the film adaptation of Nnedi Okorafor's africanfuturistic short story "Hello, Moto". The short film, Hello, Rain, stars Keira Hewatch as Rain, a scientist and witch. In February 2017, Fiery Film Production optioned the short story and began production.

It had its world premiere at the International Short Film Festival Oberhausen, on 6 May 2018.

Surreal16 Collective

Obasi is a co-founding member of the Surreal16 (S16) Collective. Inspired by the Danish cinema movement Dogme 95, Surreal16 was born from a mutual admiration by three Nigerian filmmakers (Obasi, Abba Makama, and Micheal Omonua). They became disillusioned by the abundance of slapstick comedies and wedding films. The Collective set out to diversify output and encourage a new type of cinema. The collective wrote a manifesto containing sixteen rules and guidelines that govern the making of their films. The rules were announced during a panel at Africa International Film Festival 2017 after the screening of their first anthology film Visions. In 2021 Obasi and the collective founded the S16 Film Festival, a platform for the new wave of African cinema that speaks the universal vocabulary of film. In 2021, the collective released Juju Stories, a three-part anthology film exploring juju (magical) stories rooted in Nigerian folklore and urban legend. Obasi directed the second segment, "Suffer the Witch".

Mami Wata

Obasi first came up with and began developing Mami Wata in 2016. After writing a few drafts, he took part in a number of labs to help refine the script. In an interview with CNN, Obasi stated he "wanted to make a hyper-stylised film" with its style rooted in substance, taking inspiration from his favourite filmmakers such as Akira Kurosawa and David Lynch. The characters Prisca and Zinwe were inspired by Obasi's late sisters. Production companies attached to Mami Wata include Obasi's Fiery Film Company, Guguru Studios, Palmwine Media, Swiss Fund Visions Sud Est, and Ifind Pictures of France.

Principal photography took place on location in the rural villages of Benin and wrapped in January 2021. At the Sundance Film Festival, cinematographer Lílis Soares won the Special Jury Prize in the World Dramatic Competition for the film's cinematography. It also picked up three awards at FESPACO - Prix de la Critique Pauline S. Vieyra (African Critics Award), Meilleure Image (Cinematography Award) and Meilleur Décor (Set Design Award). It was acquired by Dekanalog for North American distribution.

In October 2023, it was selected as the Nigerian entry for Best International Feature Film at the 96th Academy Awards by The Nigerian Official Selection Committee (NOSC). It has been nominated in the Best International Film category of the 39th Independent Spirit Awards.

== Filmography ==
Title	Year	Production company	Role
Ojuju	2014	Fiery Film Company	Writer, Director, Editor
O-Town	2015	Fiery Film Company	Writer, director, editor
Visions: An Anthology of Short Films	2017	Surreal16 Collective	Co-writer, co-director
Hello, Rain	2018	Fiery Film Company Igodo Films Matanya Films	Writer, director
Lionheart	2018	The Entertainment Network (T.E.N) Netflix	Co-writer
Living in Bondage: Breaking Free	2019	Play Network Studios Natives Filmworks Michelangelo Productions	Co-writer
Juju Stories	2021	20 Pounds Production Ifind Pictures Fiery Film Osiris Creatives Cine9ja	Co-writer, co-director
Mami Wata	2023	Fiery Film Company Ifind Pictures PalmWine Media Guguru Studios	Writer, director
A Blue Butterfly	2027	Boudica Entertainment	Director; Written by Steve Toussaint
