= RedTV (streaming service) =

Nigerian web-based channel

REDTV
- Country: Nigeria
- Broadcast area: Worldwide
- Headquarters: Lagos, Nigeria

Programming
- Language: English

Ownership
- Owner: United Bank for Africa
- Key people: Bola Atta; Executive Producer

History
- Launched: 2015
- Founder: UBA

Links
- Website: https://itsred.tv

REDTV is a Nigerian web-based channel established by UBA.

== History ==
REDTV started as an online video content platform, and pivoted into a media company with the formation of an on-demand audio platform, RED RADIO, an online lifestyle web radio/podcast hub that brings music, entertainment, information, news, and trends to diverse audiences.

On 26 December 2021, the channel launched its first feature-length movie, Unintentional (2021 film).

== Recognition ==
- The Men's Club (TMC) Gage's Awards’ Web Series of the Year 2020
- ‘Best African TV Series’ The Men's Club, Hapa Awards 2021

== See also ==
- The Men's Club (Nigerian web series)
- Unintentional (2021 film)
