= Aluu Four lynching =

2012 lynching in Nigeria

The Aluu Four lynching was a necklace lynching that involved students of the Department of Geology in the University of Port Harcourt. Their names were Ugonna Obuzor, Lloyd Toku, Chiadika Biringa, and Tekena Elkanah. They were all lynched after being accused of theft in Aluu, a community in Ikwerre local government area, Rivers State, Nigeria, on 5 October 2012.

== Incident ==
Chiadika Biringa, Lloyd Toku Mike, Tekena Elkanah and Ugonna Obuzor were all friends and coincidentally first sons of their parents, and students of University of Port Harcourt. The four students were also occasional roommates. Ugonna sometimes spent the night with Tekena who lived outside the campus because his residence on campus was broken into multiple times by armed robbers. Ugonna had a debtor called Bright who owed him some undisclosed amount of money. Ugonna sought the help of his fellow rapper Lloyd, childhood friend Tekena and roommate Chiadika. Together they ventured to the house of the debtor around midnight carrying axe, pen knife, cutlass, and a gun in order to scare the debtor. Allegedly, a misunderstanding ensued and eventually turned into a fight.

The debtor Bright started screaming, claiming that the men were there to steal laptops and mobile phones. A vigilante group from Aluu was alerted with the impression that the students were criminals disturbing the community. Before the vigilantes arrived, a mob started chasing the four men through the streets with sticks and stones. The students were caught, stripped naked, beaten and tortured until they were close to unconscious. In the presence of a crowd of Nigerian police officers and other citizens, they were dragged through mud, had concrete slabs dropped on their heads and car tires filled with petrol wrapped around their necks ("necklacing") in order to set them ablaze. There was no attempt by any of the bystanders to stop this, including the Nigerian police force.

A sister of Tekena discovered that her brother and his friends were about to be killed via "jungle justice." She tried to intervene by screaming and reiterating their innocence but was overpowered by the size of the mob. People told her to flee. In a last attempt, she contacted family members and the police but the men had been killed by the time the assistance was sought. The murder was filmed with a mobile phone and uploaded on the internet.

== Reactions ==
The 3–5-minute video showing them "necklaced" on the ground, beaten multiple times and finally set on fire, went viral on the Internet, with most viewers condemning the crime. Condolences were sent to the families of the victims. The Senate condemned the members of the community that carried out self-proclaimed justice without trial in the presence of a crowd. Students of the University protested the murders and rioted, destroying properties in the community where the students had been lynched.

== Aftermath ==
The lynching became widely known in Nigeria and the world. The crime further exposed the "jungle justice" or mob justice in Nigeria. Several people were arrested for the crime.

On July 31, 2017, Rivers State High Court sentenced police sergeant Lucky Orji, David Chinasa Ogbada and Ikechukwu Louis Amadi (aka Kapoon) to death for their involvement in the murders of the four students.

The court also acquitted four of the suspects in the trial, Saviour Johnny, Abiodun Yusuf, Joshua Ekpe and Cyril Abang.

A film titled "Dark October" based on the lynching which explains how the event (the lynching) unfolded, was released on Netflix on 4 February 2023. It was directed by Toka Mcbaror and produced by Linda Ikeji.

A fictionalized version of the lynching was the basis of the plot in the 2021 novel Lightseekers by Femi Kayode, in which three young students are brutally murdered in a Nigerian university town.

=== Aluu Community ===
Aluu is located in the Ikwerre Local Government Area of Rivers State. Rivers State capital, Port Harcourt is approximately 19 km / 12 mi away from Aluu (as the crow flies). The distance from Aluu to Nigeria's capital, 'Abuja' is approximately 461 km / 286 mi (as the crow flies).
