= Benneth Nwankwo =

Nigerian photographer and film director (born 1995)

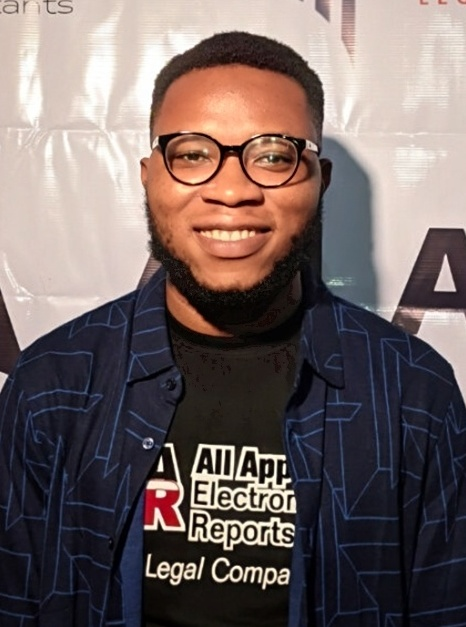
- Born: 22 February 1995 (age 31); Igando, Lagos State, Nigeria
- Occupations: Film director, screenwriter, documentary photographer, cinematographer and talk show host
- Known for: Talk show and film directing
- Awards: Outstanding Movie Maker Award in the 2022 Anambra Media And Entertainment Award

Benneth Nwankwo (born 22 February 1995) is a Nigerian documentary photographer and film director. He is from Orumba North, Anambra State, Nigeria. He is also known for directing high school web miniseries Like Filtered Water, Nigerian high-school crime drama series Class of Secrets 2023–2024, and 2022 Nigerian Dance Drama TV series Breakout. On 10 September 2022, Nwankwo was announced as the winner of Outstanding Movie Maker Award, in the 2022 Edition of Anambra Media And Entertainment Award.

== Career ==
Nwankwo has directed a number of contemporary films, including Like Filtered Water (2021), Breakout (2022), Abuse Of Rights (2021), This Is My Story (2020) and Dreams and Survival (2020). In April 2021, he was told that he would be directing the feature film A Place Between Colours.

On 25 March 2023, Benneth Nwankwo was a speaker at TEDxUNIZIK - an independently organized TED event in Nnamdi Azikiwe University, Awka, Anambra State, officially licensed by TED.

Benneth shared the stage alongside Porsché Mysticque Steele, Javier Nuñez, Obiadi Christen, Jasper Stevens, Queen Murielle, Sunrise Oluebube Chukwuka Ike and Amos Ologunleko.

On 10 September 2022, Nwankwo was announced as the winner of Outstanding Movie Maker Award in the 2022 Anambra Media And Entertainment Award. He was nominated alongside film makers Anthony Alex Rapulu Oramali, Nancy Uche and Jamie Godsword.

As a documentary photographer and a talk show host, on 31 January 2020 he hosted what was considered the first indigenous photo exhibition in Anambra State. The event tagged "Akaraka: Anambra Through A Lens", attracted art and entertainment lovers from South East Nigeria and beyond. The event, which also featured live performances, was intended in part to highlight the state's potential as a tourist economy, in hopes of creating economic opportunity and reducing crime. In addition to Nwankwo, the other photographers exhibited were Uju Egwin, Obiora Okoye, and Michael Ike. The former Commissioner for Youth and Creative Economy in Anambra State, Afam Mbanefo, praised Benneth Nwankwo's usage of documentary photographs to tell the stories of Anambra state.

In October 2017, Benneth Nwankwo published his photographs of a nine-year-old boy hawking groundnut in Anambra state. The photographs quickly circulated all over the internet and were published by various newspapers in Nigeria. Many Nigerians, including 2017 Anambra State Gubernatorial Candidate, Okeke Chika Jerry, expressed interest in assisting the boy, Sunday Nweke, in furthering his education.

Benneth Nwankwo is the founder of NollywoodCV, a professional talent discovery platform for Nollywood filmmakers that allows actors, directors, crew members and other industry professionals to create searchable profiles.

== Endorsement ==
In October 2020, a Nigerian real estate company, De-GraceLand Home Consults, signed Benneth Nwankwo alongside Chioma Okonkwo (Former Miss Impact Anambra) as brand ambassadors. The contract lasted for a year.

== Book ==
- How To Write About Nigeria: A Collection of Satirical Commentaries That Attempts To Shed Light On The Nigerian Condition.

== Filmography ==
- Dreamscape And Survival (2020)
- The Irreplaceable (2020)
- The Little Things That Matters (2020)
- This Is My Story (2020)
- Abuse Of Rights (2020)
- Hustler (2021)
- The Web (2020)
- Like Filtered Water - The Series (2021), 3 episodes
- A Place Between Colours (2021)
- Breakout (2022 TV miniseries), 1 episode
- Flawed (2022)
- Class of Secrets (2023), Nigerian web series
- Not Perfect Date (2025), Nigerian web series
