= Steve Egboro =

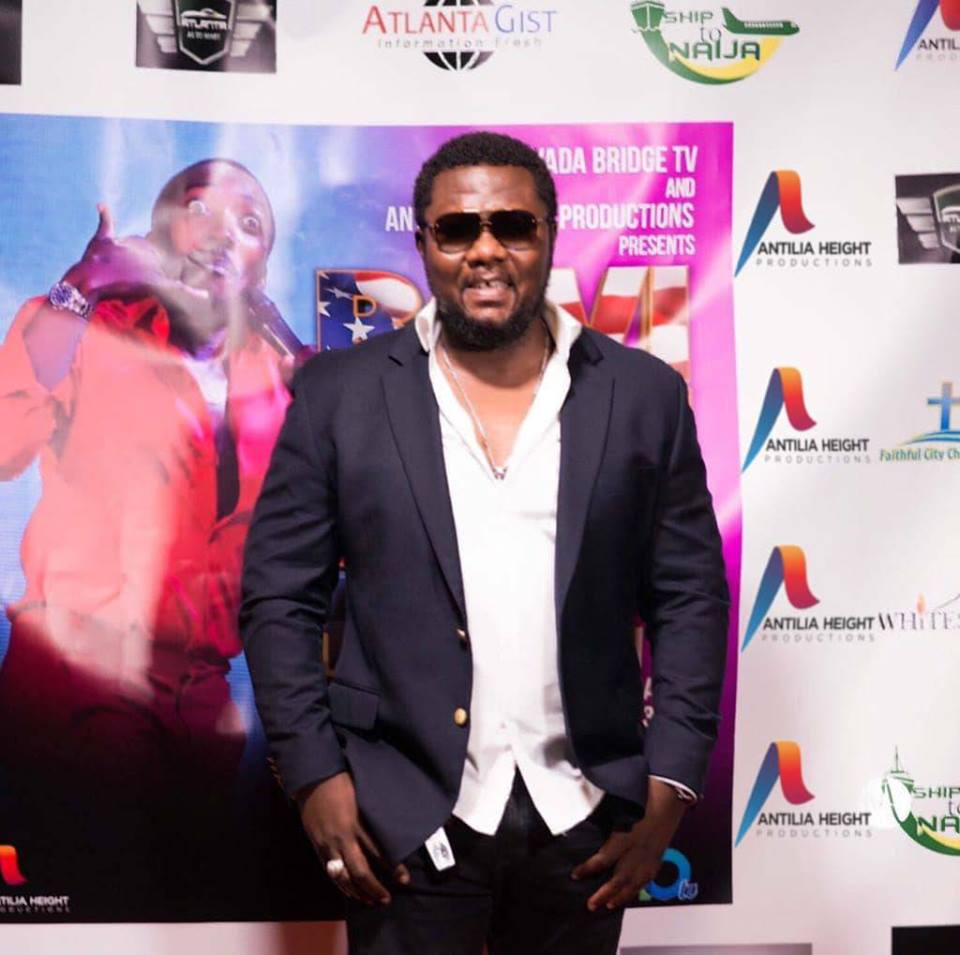
- Steve Egboro at the Bovi Man on Fire Comedy event in Atlanta, Georgia
- Occupations: Filmmaker; Promoter; Executive producer; Oil & Gas Executive; CEO of Antilia Height Productions
- Years active: 2002–present

Steve Egboro Is Atlanta based filmmaker, event manager, Oil & Gas Executive. He is the founder & CEO of Antilia Height Productions, a full service production company that operates in arts, entertainment, and recreation.

== Career ==
He facilitated promotions to stage Nigerian comedian Bovi’s Man On Fire comedy gig on June 22, 2018, at the Infinite Energy Theater, in Georgia, United States of America. The event also featured appearances from other Nigerian entertainers, comedians Elenu and Mr. Patrick and actor Joseph Benjamin.

Antilia Heights Production also joined forces with Nigerian singer, Davido to extend his 30 Billion Gang Concert to ‘God’s Own Country’.

Egboro's Antilia Heights Production movie ‘The Heir Apparent’ will be released in August 2018. The movie is directed by Robert Peters and was shot both in Atlanta and Lagos Nigeria with Nollywood actors, Richard Mofe-Damijo and Joseph Benjamin .

== Recognition ==
Earlier in 2018, Egboro received a Certificate of Honors by organizers of the Nollywood Travel Film Festival in North America, and on August 8, 2018, he was awarded with an Honorary Doctorate Degree by Trinity International University of Ambassadors, Atlanta.
