= Iremide Adeoye =

Nigerian actor

- Born: Iremide Adeoye; May 29; Nigeria
- Citizenship: Nigerian
- Education: University of Lagos
- Occupations: Actor & Media Personality
- Notable work: Wura, Under The Influence, Funmilayo Ransome-Kuti, The Origin: Madam Koi-Koi

Iremide Adeoye, is a Nigerian actor, creative and media personality. He gained prominence for his roles as Lolu Adeleke in the series Wura, Dami in the series Under the Influence, Young Israel in Funmilayo Ransome-Kuti., Idowu in The Origin: Madam Koi Koi, Omotunde in Headless. , Tayo in Miles Away from Home and Dimeji in the film Her Dark Past.

His work spans drama, thriller, and biographical genres, with distribution across African and international streaming platforms.

== Background ==
Iremide was born in Nigeria. He coined the name Fantasticks as a reference to his drumming skills.

== Career ==
Iremide debuted as Peter in No.1 in 2021. He later starred as Teenage Tunde in The Order Of Things and Segun in Tiger's Tail. He gained prominence for portraying Lolu Adeleke in Wura, and appeared as Idowu in the 2023 film The Origin: Madam Koi Koi released on Netflix.

He played Dimeji in Her Dark Past alongside Linda Ejiofor-Suleiman and Daniel Etim Effiong. He also played a lead role in the film Headless which screened on the 2024 Africa International Film Festival opening night. Alongside award-winning Nigerian actresses Kehinde Bankole and Joke Silva, he starred in the Bolanle-directed biopic Funmilayo Ransome-Kuti.

In early 2025, Iremide appeared as the lead in the Showmax comedy TV series Under the Influence.

He has modeled for several local Nigerian clothing brands, including Ashluxe.

== Filmography ==
=== TV Series ===
- Wura (2023-2025) as Lolu Adeleke
- Under the Influence (2025-present) as Dami

=== Movies ===
- The Origin: Madam Koi Koi (2023) as Idowu
- Funmilayo Ransome-Kuti (2024) as Young Israel
- Headless (2026) as Omotunde
- Her Dark Past (2024) as Dimeji
- Miles Away From Home (2025) as Tayo

== Awards and nominations ==
Year	Award	Category	Recipient	Result	Ref
2023	Scream All Youth Awards	Best actor in a supporting role	Himself for Wura	Won	
2024	NXT Honors	Best Actor in a Film or TV Series	Himself for Wura	Nominated	
