= Yvonne Jegede =

Nigerian actor and singer

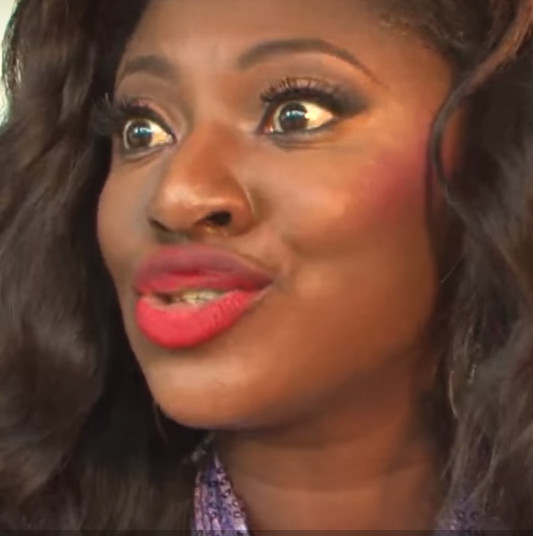
- Born: August 25, 1983 (age 43); Agenebode, Edo State
- Education: Girne American University
- Known for: Producing 3 is Company
- Notable work: Missing Angels
- Spouse: Olakunle Fawole
- Children: Xavier Jegede

Yvonne Jegede is a Nigerian actress, film producer, model, and television personality. She gained recognition after being featured in the music video for "African Queen" by 2Baba, alongside Annie Macaulay. She has starred in several Nollywood films and produced the film 3 Is Company (2015).

== Early life and education ==
Yvonne Jegede was born in Agenebode, Edo State, south-south Nigeria on the 25th of August 1983. She had her primary education in Lagos State,and secondary education in Langtang, Plateau State, Nigeria, before proceeding to the Girne American University, where she graduated with a bachelor's degree in International Relations.

== Career ==
Yvonne Jegede started her movie career in 2004 when she featured in the Nollywood movie Missing Angels. Her first major camera debut came up in 2005 with her appearance in the now popular music video for "African Queen" by 2Face Idibia. After her university education in 2012, she came back to Nollywood and starred in movies including Okafor's Law, Single and Married and 10 Days in Sun City.

In 2015, she produced her first movie, 3 is Company where she starred as the lead character.

In late 2016, she was on the cover in the wedding edition of Genevieve Magazine.

In November 2025, Jegede celebrated her 20 anniversary on stage, reflecting on a career that began after being discovered by filmmaker Charles Novia, which led to her debut speaking role in Missing Angel and her breakthrough appearance in 2004 in 2Baba's "African Queen" music video. Outside of her acting career, she has engaged in philanthropic initiatives, including sponsoring primary and secondary education for underprivileged students since 2019 and founding a support initiative for single parents.

== Personal life ==
On 1 November 2021, Yvonne Jegede, who is a single mother, celebrated the third birthday of her son, and spoke of his importance in her life.

Following her separation from actor Olakunle "Abounce" Fawole, her ex-husband publicly took responsibility for the marital breakdown, stating in an interview that his actions caused the split and acknowledging that while his romantic feelings had ceased, he maintained a strong post-marital respect and love for her.

== Filmography ==
- Silver Spoon
- Rachel's Diary
- The Axis
- A Night Chic Squad
- Missing Angel (2004) as Rosa
- The AIDS Patient (2005)
- Emotional Blunder (2006) as Georgina
- Hitler (2007) as Lilly
- Sister's Love (2008) as Angie
- See Through Me (2013) as
- Oge's Sister (2014) as Esther
- The Good Wife (2015) as Bola
- Okafor's Law (2016) as Toyin
- Shoot to Kill (2016)
- Just for Two (2016) as Tessy
- My Best Friend's Wedding (2016)
- Love and Cancer (2017)
- Unfinished Business (2017)
- Inbred (2018) as Babe
- The Hustle is Real (2018) as Sister Kemi
- A Night Before (2019)
- Gold Statue (2019) as Aliya
- Room Hate (2020) as Josephine
- Hannah's Plight (2020) as Ariella
- Small Thing (2021) as Derbie
- Cordelia (2021) as Remi
- Marrying a Campbell (2021) as Tokoni Campbell
- Come Alive (2021) as Amaka
- Big Sister (2022) as Onome
- Before Valentine's (2022) as Ola
- Rising: City of Dreams (2022)
- Blind Stranger (2022) as Ngali
- A Tribe Called Judah (2023) as Modupe
- Mikolo (2023) as Lola
- Adire (2023) as Shalewa
- Triad (2023) as Anwuli
- Gangs of Lagos (2023) as Princess
- Broken Sceptre (2024) as Kokomma
- Crossroads (2024) as Rosemary
- A Father's Love (2024) as Ladi
- Makemation (2025) as Zanzi Whenu

== Awards ==
- Best Actress of the Year at the Africa Magic Viewers' Choice Awards
- Nollywood Most Promising Actress in Nigeria at the City People Entertainment Awards
- Best Actress in a Supporting Role at the Africa Movie Academy Award
- Most Promising Act to Watch at the Golden Icon Movie Academy Awards
- Nigerian Fitness Icon (NFI) award in 2016
