= Baaj Adebule =

Nigerian actor, model filmmaker (born 1988)

- Born: Bandele Adetolu Adebule; 25 October 1988 (age 37); Surulere, Lagos, Nigeria
- Education: Covenant University
- Occupations: Actor; Writer; Film maker; Model; Host
- Years active: 2012 — present
- Notable work: Tinsel

Baaj Adebule (born 25 October 1988) is a Nigerian actor, model, and filmmaker from Ogun State in Southwestern Nigeria.

He has appeared in Nollywood films since 2012. He began his career on M-Net's soap opera Tinsel and appeared in movies and TV series such as Hush, The Men's Club, Payday, Zena, Uncloaked, The Governor, The Missing, A Soldier's Story 1 & 2, Omo Wa, Beast Within, and The Moles.

== Early life ==
Adebule was born in Jalupon Hospital in Surulere, Lagos. He spent most of his childhood in Maryland Lagos, where he attended Seat of Wisdom primary school and Caleb secondary school. He moved to Surulere following his parents' divorce in 2005. Adebule is of Yoruba descent and is a native of the Ijebu Ode local government area of Ogun State. He was brought up in a Christian home. His father was a mechanical engineer and his mother an accountant and entrepreneur. He is the youngest of nine children from several marriages.

His school years were focused on academics, as his parents emphasized the importance of a formal education. At a young age, he focused on sports and arts, playing football, basketball, badminton, table tennis, and track.

In his biography, Adebule stated he was a member of the local church choir from a young age as well as a member of his school's art club. Adebule was especially known for his love of movies, which he focused on following his parents' divorce.

In 2005, Adebule began attending Covenant University in Ogun State to study economics. He graduated with a second-class upper in 2009. After graduating, he was engaged in arts and sports. He worked in Multi Choice for almost two years before eventually quitting to focus on entertainment.

== Career ==
Adebule started his acting and modeling career in 2010 while working a nine-to-five job. He would go for auditions and photoshoots in his free time. He eventually got a small stint on the telenovela Tinsel.

With the support of his friends and family, he was a contestant in the 2011 Mr. Nigeria pageant, where he came 4th. In 2012, he began acting and modelling full-time.

Adebule got cast in multiple TV series, including Secrets and Scandals, Happy Family, acting alongside actors like Sola Sobowale, Victor Olaotan and others.

By 2014, Adebule was starring in films and TV series such as Four Crooks and Rookie, Deadline, Studio, and Lekki Wives.

He made his first big-screen debut in 2015 in action movie A Soldier's Story, as well as the critically acclaimed Road to Yesterday. Also in that year, he launched his production company House of Baaj Pictures. His first production was Seeing Betrayal, which he wrote and directed went on to win the best short film in Africa 2015 at the Zafaa Global Awards.

Adebule starred in Hush, portraying Adze. He starred in productions like 5ive, The Governor, Uncloaked, The Missing, Payday, and Battleground Showdown.

== Filmography ==
Year	Name	Character	Role	Production	Director
2012	Tinsel	Javier	Supporting	Telenovela	Mnet
2012	Secrets and Scandals	Victor	Lead	Series	Elvis Chuwks
2012	Happy Family	Chris	Supporting	Series	Elvis Chuwks
2013	Four Crooks and A Rookie	Toba	Supporting	Film	Eze Ugo Maduka
2013	Two Sides of A Coin	Hacker	Supporting	Series	–
2014	Deadline	David	Lead	Series	Imoh Umoren
2014	Studio	Young One	Supporting	Series	OLA
2015	Lekki Wives	Director	Supporting	Series	Blessing Egbe
2015	Seeing Betrayal	Husband	Lead	Short Film	Baaj Adebule
2015	A Soldier's Story	Captain Dave	Supporting	Film	Frankie Ogar
2015	Road to Yesterday	Janitor/Nurse	Supporting	Film	Ishaya Bako
2015	Shuga	Bartender	Supporting	Series	Biyi Bamidele
2016	Batteries Not Included	Guy	Lead	Short Film	OluYomi Ososanya
2016	Hush	Adze	Lead	Telenovela	Vicor S. Tope O. & Pat
2016	The Governor	Carl	Supporting	Series	Ema E.
2016	5ive	Segun	Lead	Series	OLA
2017	Uncloaked	Thankgod	Lead	Film	Daniel Oriahi
2017	The Missing	Detective Lazarus	Lead	Film	Seyi Babatope
2017	Distraction	Kevin	Supporting	Short Film	Deolu Owu
2017	Stay	Femi	Lead	Short Film	Ayomide Adeleke
2018	The Undergrads	Tunde	Lead	SitCom	Sade Dada
2018	Armstrong	Doctor	Supporting	Short Film	Maverick Films
2018	T.R.U.L.I.S	Taiwo Mathews	Lead	Series	7 Series
2018	Payday	Paul	Lead	Film	Lawrence Cheta
2018	30 Minutes	Johnbull/JB	Supporting	Series	7 Series
2018	Requital	Husband	Lead	Short film	Amaka Sandra
2018	Bachelor's Party	Abdul	Lead	Film	Seun Akinseloyin
2018	Through the Fast Lane	James	Lead	Series	Abiodun Williams
2018	Club	Tunde	Supporting	Film	Imoh Umoren
2018	BattleGround Showdown	Adze Tsenogu	Lead	Telenovela	Yemi Filmboy Morafa
2018	The Men's Club	Louis	Lead	Web Series	Tola Odunsi
2018	3 Bottles on aTable	Segun	Lead	Pilot	Baaj Adebule
2019	Wrong Con	John	Lead	Shortfilm	Charles Obiemere
2019	Beast Within	Stanley	Lead	Film	Daniel Oriahi
2019	Zena	Loik	Lead	Film	Daniel Oriahi
2019	Rust	Collins	Supporting	Film	Eseosa Adanihuomwan
2019	The Men's Club Season 2	Louis	Lead	Web Series	Tola Odunsi

Unreleased

Shoot Date	Name	Character	Role	Production	Director
2015	Eripa	Jeffery	Lead	Film	Kayode Adeleke
2018	A Soldier's Story: Return From The Dead	Captain Dave	Lead	Film	Frankie Ogar
2018	3's Company	Shade	Lead	SitCom	Paul Gaius
2018	Deeds	Detective Steve	Supporting	Film	Omas
2019	New Guy	New Guy	Lead	Short Film	Tolulope Ajayi
2019	Lemonade	Harry	Lead	Film	Mustapha Edochie
2019	Fair Exchange	Joshua	Lead	Film	Abiodun Williams
2019	Scarlett	Frank	Support	Film	Eseosa Adanihuomwan
2019	Letting Go	Maxwell	Lead	Film	Abiodun Williams
2019	Maple Inn	Isaac	Supporting	Film	Seun Akinseloyin
2019	The Moles	Kanmi	Lead	Film	Uche Chukwu
2019	The Missing Anthology Series	Detective Lazarus	Lead	Mini Series	Seyi Babatope

== Awards and nominations ==
Year	Award ceremony	Category	Film	Result	Ref
2017	Best of Nollywood Awards	Revelation of the Year –male	—N/a	Nominated	
