= Mister Africa International =

- Type: Beauty pageant
- Parent organization: House of Twitch
- Headquarters: London, United Kingdom
- First edition: 2012; 14 years ago
- Most recent edition: 2024
- Current titleholder: Sunday Stephen, Uganda
- Language: English
- Website: Official Website

Mister Africa International, established in 2012, is an annual international male pageant organised by House of Twitch, it involves a worldwide search for the most adorable African man in the world. It currently has franchises in 30 African countries and has had participations from 40 African countries.

The Current Titleholder is Sunday Stephen who represented Uganda at the competition.

== Competition ==
Every year, representatives from 30 African countries are being selected to compete at the grand finale.

The winner of Mr Africa International travels to the contest's headquarters in London, which is the hub of Mister Africa International. He will then travel to different countries and raise funds for the education of disabled children and small-scale businesses in Africa under his IME Foundation. The winner also gets endorsement deals, movie features, grace magazine covers, some international fashion shows as well as a one-year contract with one of the biggest modelling agencies in London.

== History ==
Mr Africa International was launched in 2012 by Ayotunde Fabamwo, the CEO of the House of Twitch. The maiden edition was held in London at the African Center at Convent Garden, it involved 20 participants from 20 African countries and Adonis O’holi who represented Sierra Leone emerged winner.

After three successful editions, Mister Africa International pageant was moved to Africa and was held in Lagos, Nigeria in 2016 after an emergency cancellation in Botswana, other countries that have also hosted the ceremony includes; Ivory Coast and Angola.

Some notable persons that emerged from Mr Africa International are; Ex Big Brother Naija housemate Emmanuel Umoh (First Nigerian to win Mister Africa International).

== Titleholders ==
List of titleholders since its inception
Year	Titleholder	Country	Ref(s)
2012	Adonis O’holi	Sierra Leone	
2013	Jaydon Anderson	Botswana	
2014	Arnaldo Jose	Angola	
2015	Iodi Wordi	Ghana	
2016	Akol Dok	South Sudan	
2017	Jean de Dieu Ntabanganyimana	Rwanda	
2018	Calisah Abdulhamid	Tanzania	
2019	Emmanuel Umoh	Nigeria	
2021	Eryvaldo Reis	Angola	
2022	Mathiue BIbasso	Ivory Coast	
2023	Eric Osaze	Nigeria	
2024	Stephen Muhire	Uganda	
