= Jungle justice =

Form of extrajudicial punishment or killing

Jungle justice (also known as mob justice or street justice) is a form of extrajudicial punishment carried out by angry mobs or vigilante groups against individuals accused of crimes. The attacks involve the public humiliation, physical assault, or summary execution of the accused without any form of legal trial. Treatment can vary from a "muddy treatment" (where the alleged criminal is forced to roll in mud for hours) to severe torture followed by execution — victims may be killed by beating, immolation, necklacing, or stoning. While the term "jungle justice" is used across West and Central Africa to describe mob-led extrajudicial punishment, it is commonly studied and documented in Nigeria and Cameroon.

This form of street justice is typically a response to perceived failures in formal justice systems, particularly in regions where law enforcement is seen as corrupt, ineffective, or absent. For example, in Nigeria and Cameroon, jungle justice has grown increasingly prevalent due to public frustration with systemic police inefficiency, long delays in court proceedings, and widespread impunity for criminals." Common "offenses" that trigger mob justice include blasphemy, child abduction, petty theft, and witchcraft, with many attacks related to disputes that escalate through rumor and misinformation.

Notable examples of jungle justice include the 2012 killing of the Aluu Four — four university students in Rivers State who were falsely accused of theft before being tortured and burned alive; the 2021 lynching of 16-year-old Anthony Okpahefufe and two other boys in Cross River State over an unproven allegation of stealing; and the murder of sound engineer David Imoh in Lagos in 2022 after he attempted to mediate a dispute between Okada riders. In addition to those accused of criminal acts, others have been targeted largely based on their identity or beliefs: Deborah Samuel Yakubu was brutally killed by her classmates in Sokoto after being accused of blasphemy in 2022; Martina Okey Itagbor was tortured and burned to death in Cross River State after being labeled a witch in 2023; and Talle Mai Ruwa, a man with a mental health condition, was dragged from a police station and set ablaze by a mob in Bauchi State for alleged blasphemy. In 2012, 70-year-old Rebecca Adewumi was tortured to death in Omuo Ekiti by youths who accused her of witchcraft.

== See also ==
- Frontier justice - Extrajudicial killings in the American Wild West
