= Lizzy Evoeme =

Nigerian actress (1941–2024)

- Born: 1 December 1942; Calabar, Colony and Protectorate of Nigeria
- Died: 5 May 2024 (aged 81); Port Harcourt, Rivers State, Nigeria
- Other name: Ovuleria
- Citizenship: Nigerian
- Occupation: Actress
- Years active: 1982–1993

Elizabeth "Lizzy" Evoeme (1 December 1942 – 5 May 2024), also known as Ovuleria, was a Nigerian actress who was active from 1982 to 1993 prior to the advent of Nollywood.

== Biography ==
Evoeme was born in Calabar on 1 December 1942, to a sea worker father. She began her career acting in a drama group called ‘NdiIchie’ where she auditioned for the role of Ovuleria in the New Masquerade.

Evoeme was prominent in the Nigerian television industry as an actress from 1982 to 1993 prior to the advent of Nollywood. She was originally named Elizabeth which was later shortened to "Lizzy". Evoeme was known for her role as Ovuleria, the wife of a no-nonsense television character called Chief Zebrudaya Okoroigwe Nwogbo also known as Chika Okpala on the TV show, New Masquerade. The programme which used to feature on Nigeria's national TV station, NTA, has over the years been stopped. She played the role of a petty trader and an assertive but obedient woman who never disagreed or argued with her husband's decision no matter how many others disagreed with him.

Evoeme once explained that she never knew the meaning of her stage name "Ovuleria".

After her exit from television, not much was heard about Evoeme. In November 2019, death rumours about her were refuted.

Evoeme died on 5 May 2024, at the age of 81.

== Awards ==
In 2020, she was recognised for her contributions to the entertainment industry.

== Filmography ==
- Circle Of Doom (1993)
- New Masquerade
