= The Africa Institute =

Research and postgraduate education institute in Sharjah

- Formation: 6 June 2018; 8 years ago
- Type: Research and postgraduate education institute
- Headquarters: Sharjah, United Arab Emirates
- Dean: Salah M. Hassan
- Parent organization: Global Studies University
- Website: www.theafricainstitute.org

The Africa Institute is an interdisciplinary research and postgraduate education institute based in Sharjah, United Arab Emirates. Its academic work focuses on Africa and the African diaspora across the humanities and social sciences. Established in 2018, it became the first constituent institute of Global Studies University following the university's establishment in 2023.

== History ==
The institute traces its origins to the first Symposium on African and Arab Relations, held in Sharjah in December 1976 under the patronage of Sultan bin Muhammad Al-Qasimi, ruler of the Emirate of Sharjah. The symposium brought together 45 African and Arab intellectuals. One of its recommendations was the establishment in Sharjah of an institute dedicated to studying and documenting relations between Africa and the Arab world.

Africa Hall was inaugurated in 1976 and hosted the symposium as its inaugural event. After being rebuilt, it reopened in September 2018 as a venue for conferences, lectures, performances, film screenings, and other public programs associated with The Africa Institute.

The Africa Institute was formally established on 6 June 2018 as a center for research, documentation, and postgraduate education in African and African diaspora studies.

Hoor Al-Qasimi served as the founding president of The Africa Institute, while Salah M. Hassan served as its founding dean.

In September 2023, Global Studies University was established under Emiri Decree No. 57 of 2023. The decree placed The Africa Institute within the university's institutional structure. The Africa Institute became the university's first constituent institute.

== Organization and governance ==
The Africa Institute is a constituent institute of Global Studies University. Hoor Al-Qasimi, the institute's founding president, currently serves as President of Global Studies University. Salah M. Hassan, the institute's founding dean, serves concurrently as Chancellor of Global Studies University and Dean of The Africa Institute.

The institute conducts teaching and research across the humanities and social sciences.

== Campus ==
The Africa Institute is located on the Global Studies University campus in the Al Manakh district of Sharjah. The campus occupies the former Khalid bin Mohammed School, which was established in the mid-1970s as part of an early generation of modern public educational buildings in the United Arab Emirates.

== Academic and cultural programs ==
The MA in Global African Studies is a Global Studies University degree housed within The Africa Institute. The university also offers a Ph.D. in Global Studies, with faculty from the institute contributing to teaching and research across the programs.

Global Studies University also offers certificate courses in Arabic, Amharic, Hausa, and Kiswahili through its Language and Translation Program.

The institute's research and teaching approach treats African studies as a global field, including the study of connections between Africa, the Arabian Gulf, the Indian Ocean region, and African diaspora communities.

The institute also organizes country- and region-focused programs, conferences, exhibitions, lectures, publications, film screenings, and performances. Its country- and region-focused programs have included Ethiopia, Ghana, and the Indian Ocean region.

== Fellowships ==
The institute administers senior and postdoctoral fellowships named in honor of Ali Mazrui, Toni Morrison, Okwui Enwezor, and Fatema Mernissi. It also offers fellowships in creative writing, translation, and research on restitution and reparation.
