= Nollywood =

Nigerian film industry

Nollywood, a portmanteau of Nigeria and Hollywood, is a sobriquet that originally referred to the Nigerian film industry. The origin of the term goes back to the early 2000s, traced to an article in The New York Times. Due to the history of evolving meanings and contexts, there is no clear or agreed-upon definition for the term, which has made it a subject of several controversies.

Film scholars have also used the term Nollywood to refer to a group of movies produced starting in the 1990s, which have now become popular in Africa and diaspora audiences, that were often relatively low budget and made in a short time period. These movies often featured well known celebrities to boost viewership and were distributed through home viewing and informal networks.

== Etymology ==
The origin of the term "Nollywood" remains unclear; Jonathan Haynes – who argues that the term has helped shape the recognition and development of the Nigerian film industry – traced the earliest usage of the word to a 2002 article by Matt Steinglass in The New York Times, where it was used to describe Nigerian cinema. Charles Igwe noted that Norimitsu Onishi also used the name in a September 2002 article he wrote for the New York Times. The term continues to be used in the media to refer to the Nigerian film industry, with its definition later assumed to be a portmanteau of the words "Nigeria" and "Hollywood", the American major film hub.

The definition of which films are considered Nollywood has always been debated. Alex Eyengho defined Nollywood as "the totality of activities taking place in the Nigerian film industry, be it in English, Igbo, Hausa, Yoruba, Itsekiri, Edo, Efik, Ijaw, Urhobo, Ibibio, Annang or any other of the over 300 Nigerian languages". He further stated that "the historical trajectory of Nollywood started since the pre and post independent Nigeria, with the theatrical (stage) and cinematic (celluloid) efforts of the likes of Chief Hubert Ogunde, Chief Amata, Baba Sala, Ade Love, Eddie Ugbomah and a few others".

Over the years, the term Nollywood has also been used to refer to other affiliated film industries, such as the Ghanaian English-language cinema, whose films are usually co-produced with Nigeria and/or distributed by Nigerian companies. The term has also been used for Nigerian/African diaspora films considered to be affiliated with Nigeria or made specifically to capture the Nigerian audience. There is no clear definition on how "Nigerian" film has to be in order to be referred to as Nollywood.

== Sub-industries ==
=== Nigerian cinema ===
Film-making in Nigeria is divided largely along regional, marginally ethnic and religious lines. Thus, there are distinct film industries – each seeking to portray the concern of the particular section and ethnicity it represents. However, there is the English-language film industry which is a melting pot for filmmaking from most of the regional industries.

The Igbo-language film, Living in Bondage (1992), first Nollywood movie was directed by Chris Obi Rapu and starring Okechukwu Ogunjiofor, Kenneth Okonkwo, Kanayo O. Kanayo and Kenneth Nnebue (who also produced it), among others, is credited with kick-starting the Nollywood and is heavily associated with southeastern Nigeria. After that were films like Circle of Doom, Nneka The Pretty Serpent, Rituals and Rattle Snake.

It is important to recognize that the Nigerian film industry has a more complex and diverse history from before the 1990s. Worth mentioning is 1987's Things Fall Apart, an adaptation of Chinua Achebe's novel of the same name, starring Pete Edochie.

Although the Igbo language film Living in Bondage was the first massive nationwide hit of the videotape era, most Igbo film makers prefer to make their movies in English. This leads to the paradox where some of the most popular and beloved actors in Nollywood like Patience Ozokwor (Mama G), Chinedu Ikedieze and Osita Iheme (Aki and Pawpaw), Nkem Owoh (Osuofia), John Okafor (Mr. Ibu) who are ethnically Igbo, have mostly acted in English language movies. These actors occasionally sprinkle their movies with Igbo aphorisms and expressions (e.g. 'Chineke!', 'Tufiakwa!') but the vast majority of the dialogue is in English.

Yoruba-language cinema is also a genre of Nigerian cinema, towing behind the Igbo south eastern themed movies. The Yoruba-language cinema began as actors of various Yoruba traveling theatre groups took their works beyond the stage to delve into movie production using the Celluloid format, as far back as the mid-1960s. These practitioners are considered in some quarters to be the first true Nigerian filmmakers. Movies like Kongi's Harvest (1972), Bull Frog in The Sun (1971), Bisi, Daughter of The River (1977), Jaiyesimi (1980), and Cry Freedom (1981) fall into this era of a blossoming Yoruba movie industry. Practitioners like Ola Balogun, Duro Ladipo and Adeyemi Afolayan (Ade Love) played a significant role when they came out with Ajani Ogun in 1976. This film was one of the few huge successes that helped put the Yoruba-language cinema on the map, and it was followed by further productions by Hubert Ogunde and others. One of the first blockbusters from Nigeria came from the Yoruba language industry: Mosebolatan (1985) by Moses Olaiya grossed ₦107,000 (approx. 2015 ₦44.2 million) in five days of its release. The modern film industry started with films such as 2006's The Narrow Path by Tunde Kelani, who years earlier made The White Handkerchief; both stories were adapted from Bayo Adebowale's book The Virgin.

The Hausa-language cinema, also known informally as Kannywood, is also a sub-industry of Nollywood, mainly based in Kano. The cinema, which is the largest in Northern Nigeria, slowly evolved from the productions of RTV Kaduna and Radio Kaduna in the 1960s. Veterans like Dalhatu Bawa and Kasimu Yero pioneered drama productions that became popular with the Northern audience. The 1990s saw a dramatic change in the Northern Nigerian cinema, which was eager to draw the Hausa population who found Bollywood movies more attractive; a cinematic synthesis of Indian and Hausa culture evolved and became extremely popular. Turmin Danya ("The Draw"), 1990, is usually cited as the first commercially successful Kannywood film. It was quickly followed by others like Gimbiya Fatima and Kiyarda Da Ni. Sunusi Shehu of Tauraruwa Magazine created the term "Kannywood" in 1999 and it soon became the popular reference term for the industry. By 2012, over 2000 film companies were registered with the Kano State Filmmakers Association.

The Efik-language cinema, also known as Callywood, is also a sub-industry of Nollywood. It is mainly based in Calabar but also includes the Ibibio and Annang cinema. With the establishment of The Divine Shield Film Academy and Valianticom Movie Academy in Calabar, and the establishment of Empire Film Academy and a campus of Royal Arts Academy in Uyo, the Efik/Ibibio/Annang cinema is growing.

=== Ghanaian English-language cinema ===
Over the years the term Nollywood has also been used to refer to other affiliate film industries, such as the Ghanaian English-language cinema. Around the year 2006 through 2007, Nigerian filmmaker Frank Rajah Arase signed a contract with a Ghanaian production company, Venus Films, which involved helping to introduce Ghanaian actors into mainstream Nollywood. This collaboration eventually led to extreme popularity of certain Ghanaian actors, such as Van Vicker, Jackie Appiah, Majid Michel, Yvonne Nelson, John Dumelo, Nadia Buari and Yvonne Okoro, arguably as much as their Nigerian counterparts. Furthermore, over the years, due to the high cost of film production in Nigeria, Nigerian filmmakers have been forced to make films outside Lagos in order to cut costs, mirroring the exodus of filmmaking in Hollywood from Los Angeles to cities like Toronto and Albuquerque, a phenomenon known as runaway production. Several other producers, as a result, started shooting in cities like Accra, Ghana, channeling the savings into investing in better equipment, many of them trying to get their films onto the big screen.

=== Nollywood USA ===
Nollywood USA is a broad term, that is used to refer to Nigerian films made in the diaspora. Although they are popularly called Nollywood USA, these movies can be shot in any non-African country. These films are typically made by Nigerian filmmakers living in the diaspora and they are typically made for the Nigerian audience. Like the "Nollywood" term, the definition of "Nollywood USA" is vague.

Nollywood USA movies typically tell Nigerian stories, and they usually star established Nollywood actors, alongside upcoming Nigerian/African actors living in the diaspora. The movies usually have their premieres in Nigeria and they also sometimes secure national theatrical release like the regular Nollywood movies.

=== YouTube Nollywood ===
Nollywood filmmakers have found solace on YouTube due to piracy, and the platform has been reshaping the future of filmmaking and streaming in the digital era. YouTube Nollywood refers to films made specifically for the on-demand video sharing platform, and filmmakers are using it to distribute their work. As the platform grows, filmmakers who once made cinema blockbusters are now taking their films to YouTube.

Nollywood loses around $10–$15 billion annually to piracy, with Telegram groups being major contributing factors. The platform has produced notable stars of both producers and actors who are now thriving in the industry. There have been a few viral movies on the platform, such as Better Half by Ruth Kadiri, Treasure in the Sky by Uchenna Mbunabo, and Love in Every Word by Omoni Oboli.

== Nollywood in the Diaspora ==
As Nollywood’s popularity has spread beyond the diaspora, some scholars argue that this was actually done through informal distribution, where VHS cassettes were shared with people in cities such as Atlanta, London and Brooklyn, setting up an early global reach before the industry officially existed.

== Nollywood at 20 controversy ==
In 2012, it was announced that Nollywood would be celebrating its 20-year anniversary. This year marked the 20th year after the release of direct-to-video movie Living in Bondage (1992), which arguably marked the boom in the video film era. The anniversary was eventually celebrated in June 2013. But Yoruba filmmakers launched the industry on VHS in 1988, even as Ogunde’s stage performance dated back to 1960s to 70s.

The event was later revealed to be a decision of a segment of the industry and not a unanimously agreed event; the event was organized by Association of Movie Producers (AMP), an association consisting of producers of video films. Since announcement of the "Nollywood @ 20" event in 2012 until its celebration in 2013, the event had sparked controversies from many stakeholders; most of whom believed the industry was much older than 20 years. Since Nollywood has been a term for the entire Nigerian film industry, it was argued that Living in Bondage cannot be used to celebrate the Nigerian film industry, stating that the film was not, in fact, the first Nigerian video film, neither was it the first "successful" video film, much less the first Nigerian film.

This controversial celebration also gave rise to reports that another segment of the industry, the "Association of Nigeria Theatre Arts Practitioners (ANTP)" are planning to rename the industry into another term which would encompass the entire history of the Nigerian film industry since the term Nollywood has allegedly become ethnically dichotomized. While it was argued by supporters of the event that it was the "Nollywood brand" that was being celebrated and not the industry, counter-arguments were made that the term "Nollywood" came into existence only in the 2000s, so explanations were needed on how the "Nollywood Brand" could be extended to the year 1992 which is not specifically significant in any way, and why not just to the first Nigerian film that was made.

Alex Eyengho had noted in a 2012 article that the term "Nollywood" was absent during the formative years of both the video film era and the Golden Age. Seun Apara, in his article on 360Nobs.com stated: "It's either the promoters of the event didn't do their research well or intentionally do not want to reckon with history". Adegboyega Oyeniya comments: "I don't know what they are talking about by celebrating 'Nollywood @ 20'; are they celebrating Ramsey Tokunbo Nouah or Genevieve Nnaji? Probably, they are celebrating fortune. These people should stop deceiving Nigerians". Some media outlets also reported that the event was a result of greed and selfish interests, as the organizers visited political figures to solicit funds in the name of the Industry, but allegedly shared the funds raised amongst themselves. Another issue raised to fault the event is that the real "achievers" in Nollywood were not honoured, but rather the practitioners at almost the same level with the organizers of the supposed flawed event were honoured.

Several filmmakers and stakeholders expressed their displeasure with the supposed false celebration; Kunle Afolayan commented: "The whole idea of Nollywood at 20 does not make sense to me because the Nollywood that I know is more than 20 years. I remember my father shot a film about 37 years ago and I also grew up in the industry. As far as (I) am concerned, it's absolute crap". In another interview, he stated: "If Nollywood is the name that people decide to call the movie industry in Nigeria, then I am part of it. If Nollywood is what they say is 20 years, then I am not part of that Nollywood because I have been doing film business for more than 30 years now". Jide Kosoko also commented: "The Nigerian movie industry as far as I'm concerned is not 20 years. If we all truly belong to the same industry, then the industry I belong to is not 20 years. There is a need to tell the world the sincere story of our industry and don't rubbish the pioneers. As far as I am concerned, what they are celebrating is Living in Bondage and not Nollywood". Tunde Kelani stated: "How will Nollywood be celebrating 20 years and I am over 40 years in the industry?".

President of Actors Guild of Nigeria at the time, Ibinabo Fiberesima, admitted that Nollywood is more than 20 years, but gave what was considered an unconvincing statement on the reason behind the event, stating: "It's about celebrating our own even though Nollywood is more than 20 years. It's been long that people have been celebrating us but right now, we are celebrating ourselves and giving lots back to the society. It's a good step we have taken especially now that the qualities of our movies have improved".

== See also ==
- Media in Nigeria
- Cinema of Africa
