= List of Nigerian films of 1992 =

This is a list of Nigerian films released in 1992.

== Films ==
Title	Director	Cast	Genre	Notes	Ref
1992
Living in Bondage 1	Chris Obi Rapu	Kanayo O. Kanayo Kenneth Okonkwo Okechukwu Ogunjiofor Nnenna Nwabueze	Drama / thriller	Made in Igbo language and released on VHS	
Agba Man	Moses Olaiya	Moses Olaiya Shola Shoremekun Bankole Ayodeji Aduke George			

== See also ==
- List of Nigerian films
