= List of Nigerian films of 1993 =

This is a list of Nigerian films released in 1993.

== Films ==
Title	Director	Cast	Genre	Notes	Ref
1993
Circle of Doom	Chris Obi Rapu	Francis Agu Sandra Damascus Okechukwu Ogunjiofor Kanayo O. Kanayo		Produced by Videosonic	
Evil Passion	Chris Obi Rapu	Ngozi Nwosu Chizoba Bosah Nnenna Nwabueze Tochukwu Anadi			
Maradona (Babangida Must Go)	Gbenga Adewusi	Gbenga Adewusi Baba Suwe Pa Kusumu Lukuluku		Produced by Bayowa films Described as the first Yoruba film on Nigerian politics.	
Living in Bondage 2	Christian Onu	Kenneth Okonkwo Okechukwu Ogunjiofor Nnenna Nwabueze Rita Nzelu		Produced by NEK video links	
Ti Oluwa Ni Ile	Tunde Kelani	Kareem Adepoju Dele Odule Lekan Oladapo Yemi Shodimu Yetunde Ogunsola Oyin Adejobi			
Yemi my Lover	Niyi Love	Tajudeen Oyewole Yemi Ayebo Iyabo Momoh Iya Rainbow Dejo Tunfulu	Drama	Singer Olamide has a single of the same title	

== See also ==
- List of Nigerian films
