= Khalid bin Sultan Al Qasimi =

Khalid bin Sultan Al Qasimi may refer to:

- Khalid bin Sultan Al Qasimi (ruler)
- Khalid bin Sultan Al Qasimi (fashion designer)
