= Georges Adéagbo =

Beninese sculptor (born 1942)

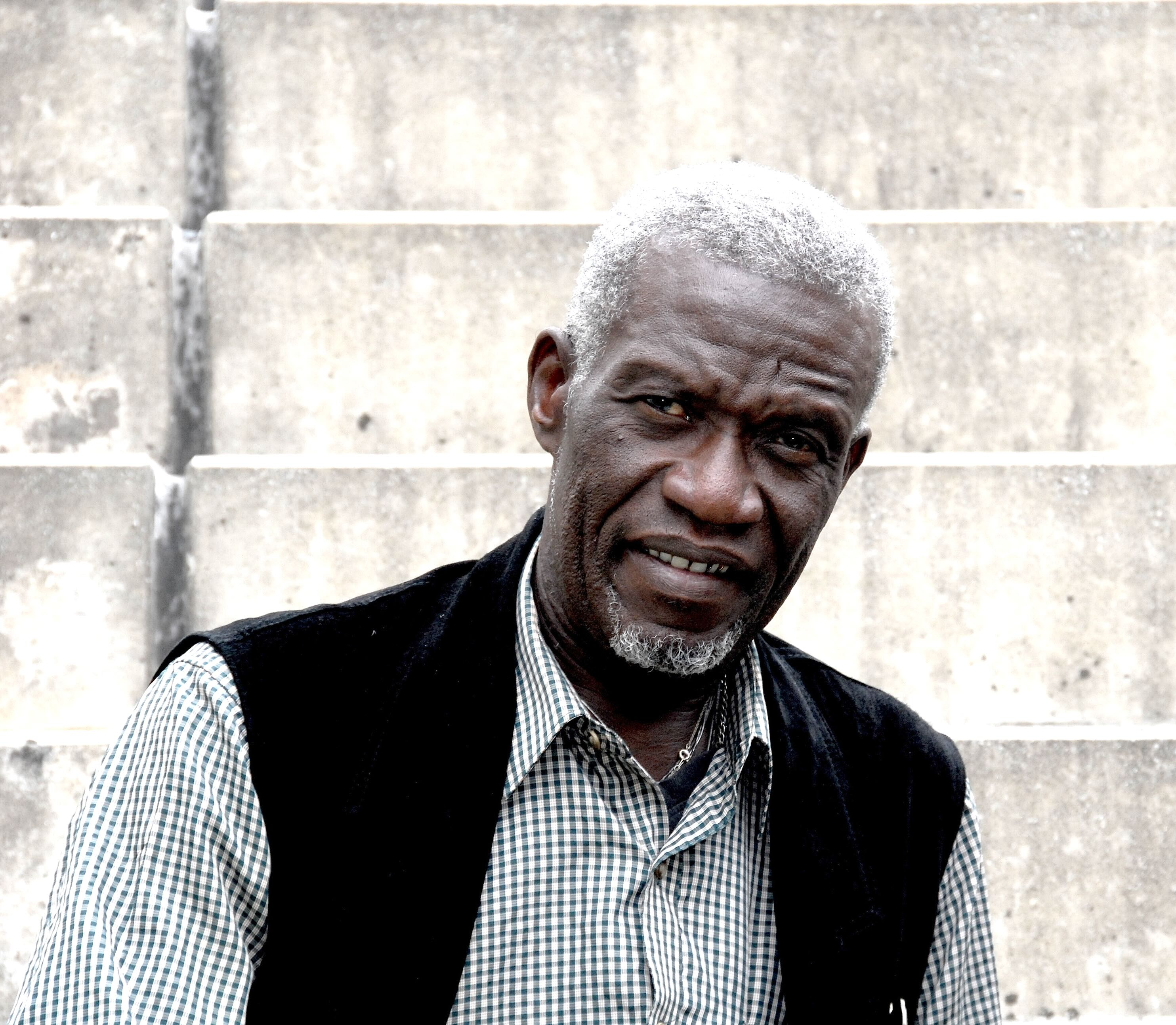
Georges Adéagbo, photographed at MAK – Museum of Applied Arts, Vienna, 2009. Photo courtesy of MAK press photographer.

Georges Adéagbo (born 1942 in Cotonou, Benin — then Dahomey) is an internationally recognized conceptual artist. Since the early 1970s he has developed a distinctive practice of assemblage, combining found objects, handwritten texts, and artworks commissioned from Beninese artisans. His installations, which he describes as a “Tribunal of Things,” question canonized narratives from Western perspectives and deconstruct notions of center and periphery. They consistently challenge simplistic distinctions between popular and elite culture, the superior and the inferior, the banal and the profound, and the sacred and the secular.

Adéagbo's work has been presented at major international exhibitions including Documenta 11 in Kassel, the Venice Biennale, the Johannesburg Biennale, and the São Paulo Biennale, as well as in leading museums across Europe, Asia, and the United States. Curators and critics such as Harald Szeemann, Okwui Enwezor, Carolyn Christov-Bakargiev, Hans Ulrich Obrist, Kasper König, Emma Lavigne, and Homi K. Bhabha have highlighted his practice as a unique contribution to postcolonial and decolonial art, shaping younger generations and helping them to avoid reproducing stereotypes of “African contemporary art.”

His works are held in prominent collections including the Centre Pompidou, the Pinault Collection, the Museum Ludwig, the Hamburger Kunsthalle, the Moderna Museet in Stockholm, the Toyota Municipal Museum of Art, and the Smithsonian National Museum of African Art. Adéagbo received an honorary mention from the jury of the 48th Venice Biennale in 1999.

While Adéagbo's international recognition is reflected in his participation in major biennials and museum collections, the foundation of his work lies in an autonomous artistic practice that he developed unnoticed over twenty years in Cotonou, without ever claiming to be an artist.

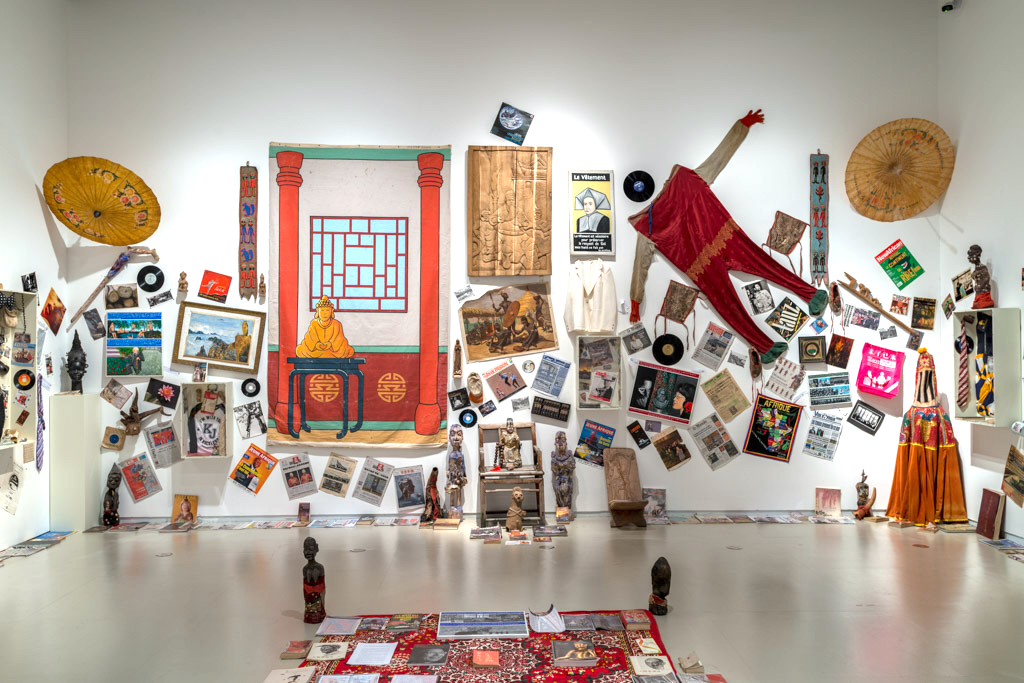
Installation detail from "La révolution et les révolutions" (2016) by Georges Adéagbo, exhibited at the 11th Shanghai Biennial. Mixed media assemblage. Photo by Alessandro Wang.

== Artistic practice ==
Adéagbo's installations unfold their effect through the thought‑through assemblage of found objects, handwritten texts, and commissioned works from Beninese artisans. During his daily walks he collects “detritus gathered from urban environments” — things that “call” to him — later arranging them in complex constellations that merge personal with collective memory. In his texts, he discusses how observing the consequences of human behavior can help us make wise decisions. He gives French, the language of the former colonizer, his own rhythm by modifying its syntax. Therefore, besides being a visual artist, he can also be considered a poet.

Adéagbo recalls one of his first combinations: “One of the first combinations I placed in our family courtyard was a package of cigarettes and a box of matches next to it. Why? The cigarettes are considered more precious than the matches, more expensive and more important, but how could you light your cigarette without a match? Often that what seems cheap, unimportant, which lives in the shadow, is essential to give value to something that everyone considers as important and valuable, essential to fulfil its function.”

Masks, sculptures, and paintings produced by local artisans in Benin, objects found in the street, books, records, and family photos bought at flea markets reference both where Adéagbo comes from and describe the mentality of the society where he is invited to show.

He describes his practice as a *“Tribunal of Things”* — a courtroom in which objects and texts present diverging perspectives. Episodes from his own biography, including his upbringing in colonial Dahomey and his interrupted studies in France, intersect with broader historical narratives. Popular culture is juxtaposed with canonized high culture, while the banal confronts the profound. The viewer is invited to engage actively, to weigh the evidence presented by objects and words, and to draw independent conclusions.

Adéagbo deliberately resists the stereotypical motifs often expected of “African” artists. At times he stages these expectations satirically, exposing the clichés projected onto non‑Western art. From his perspective as a non‑European ethnologist, he studies the customs of each exhibition site and reflects them back, sometimes as exaggerated images — paralleling the way his own culture has often been misunderstood and misrepresented.

Humor and critique also play a central role. In several installations he has highlighted how European artists celebrated as geniuses appropriated African forms without acknowledging their sources. In his exhibition at Galerie Mennour, for example, he traced how Pablo Picasso, Alberto Giacometti, and Constantin Brâncuși presented what they had learned from African artists as their own innovations. Working with his team of artisans in Benin, Adéagbo created an arsenal of boomerangs to underscore the imbalance of cultural borrowing.

Adéagbo considers himself as an archaeologist who collects and evaluates diverse samples that talk about the mentality of a society. He writes in many of his installations: “Archaeology is the science that speaks of the research and discovery of the mysteries that govern a country, the mysteries that govern a city or a person.”

== Reception by curators, critics, and galleries ==
Adéagbo's unnoticed practice attracted international attention only in the early 1990s. In 1993 the French researcher Jean‑Michel Rousset documented one of his courtyard installations in Cotonou. https://www.revuenoire.com/edition/revue-noire-18/ Although the photographs initially failed to convince their intended recipient, Parisian curator Régine Cuzin recognized the originality of the work and invited Adéagbo to participate in La route de l’art sur la route de l’esclave at the Saline Royale d'Arc-et-Senans in 1994. This debut exhibition opened doors for his worldwide recognition. Further invitations quickly followed. In 1995 Adelina von Fürstenberg included his work in Dialogues of Peace at the United Nations headquarters in Geneva. In 1996 Okwui Enwezor, who saw Adéagbo's debut presentation, published the seminal essay “The Ruined City, Desolation, Rapture and Georges Adéagbo” in NKA: Journal of Contemporary African Art. Enwezor subsequently invited him to the Johannesburg Biennale in 1997, where his work was widely noted for its stringency and precision. In 1998, while installing his contribution to Paulo Herkenhoff’s São Paulo Biennial, Adéagbo met independent curator Stephan Köhler, then curator at large for the Toyota Municipal Museum of Art. Köhler invited him to conceive an installation for the Campo dell’Arsenale in Venice, planned as a one‑day collateral event during the Biennale preview days. However, Harald Szeemann heard about the project and integrated it into his Biennale d’Appertutto at the last minute. Adéagbo received an honorary mention from the jury for The Story of the Lion – Venise d’hier, Venise d’aujourd’hui.

The project occupied art historians even decades later: Kathryn Floyd analyzed in 2015 how Adéagbo mastered a tricky venue, dialoguing with the history of a public space — the entrance to the Arsenale of Venice, the base of the power that dominated the Mediterranean for centuries. Carolyn Christov-Bakargiev invited Adéagbo to his first US solo show at MoMA PS1 in 2000. His assemblage Abraham, l’ami de Dieu was dedicated to Abraham Lincoln and the complex process of abolition. It was acquired by Carlos Basualdo for the Philadelphia Museum of Art in 2006.

In 2001 Christov‑Bakargiev, with Hans Ulrich Obrist and Laurence Bossé, invited Adéagbo to produce a work for the Loggia of the Villa Medici in Rome, which he dedicated to Napoleon. Another turning point was Adéagbo's participation at Documenta 11, curated by Enwezor. His key work The Explorer and the Explorers Facing the History of Exploration – The World‑Theater was discussed in several Documenta reviews and finally acquired by Kasper König for the Museum Ludwig in Cologne.

When it was re‑installed in 2004, Homi K. Bhabha wrote his analytical essay “La Question Georges Adéagbo” for the exhibition catalogue. In 2008 Galleria Frittelli in Florence obtained permission for Adéagbo to create installations in 23 rooms of the Palazzo Vecchio. The Grand Tour of an African was the title chosen for the publication edited by Chiara Bertola and Stephan Köhler.

The first full‑length documentary film produced by Matteo Frittelli, La personne de Georges Adéagbo, came out in 2012 and includes interviews with Enwezor, Basualdo, Daniel Birnbaum, Bertola, and scenes of the artist at work in Benin and worldwide venues. In 2014 Kerstin Schankweiler published the first PhD thesis about Adéagbo, focusing on cultural transfer in his practice: Die Mobilisierung der Dinge.

Recognition in his native Benin came much later. In 2022, the National Gallery of Benin (now ADAC) acquired one installation and showed it with 40 other artists in Art du Bénin, de la Restitution à la Révélation at the presidential palace, later touring worldwide.

Bénédicte Savoy and Georges Adéagbo were invited to discuss the complex process of restitution by KINDL Berlin on 26 May 2021. Adéagbo won 2021 the prestigious Smithsonian Artists’ Research Fellowship and dedicated it to Abraham Lincoln and the process of abolition. He was hosted by the curators of the National Museum of American history. Atlantic-Artspace opened its doors in December 2022 in Ouidah with a solo exhibition of Adéagbo, initiated and curated by Marie‑Sophie Eiche‑Demester.

As follow up of his Smithsonian Fellowship, Adéagbo was invited 2023 to create installations about Abraham Lincoln at President Lincoln's cottage WashingtonDC National Museum of African Art Washington DC 2023

The Hamburger Kunsthalle invited him in 2024 to a solo exhibition dedicated to Aby Warburg. The most recent turning points for Adéagbo's reception are François Pinault’s acquisition of Souvenir d’un présent invisible and Emma Lavigne exhibiting it in Corps et Âmes at the Bourse de Paris in 2025. In addition, Adéagbo began to work with Galerie Mennour in spring 2025.

Since then, Adéagbo's installations have been discussed in exhibition catalogues, critical essays, and academic studies. His work has been praised for challenging conventional narratives of African art, for its satirical engagement with cultural stereotypes, and for its ability to stage complex dialogues between history, memory, and contemporary culture.

In addition to museum presentations, Adéagbo's work has been exhibited by several galleries, including Frittelli Arte Contemporanea in Florence, Barbara Wien in Berlin, Lumen Travo Gallery in Amsterdam, and more recently Kamel Mennour Gallery in Paris.

== Biographical background ==
Adéagbo was born in 1942 in Cotonou, Benin (then Dahomey). His family traces its origins to Abeokuta, Nigeria, from where they migrated in the mid‑19th century. The surname “Adéagbo” is Yoruba and translates according to the artist as “you recognize a true lion by his mane.”

Adéagbo began his studies in law at the University of Abidjan in 1964 and continued in France with business administration from the late 1960s. In 1971, following the death of his father, he returned to Benin as the eldest son to assist his family. His stay, initially intended to be temporary, became permanent when his family withheld his passport, preventing him from completing his degree and internship in France. During this period, he began arranging objects and handwritten texts in his family courtyard, a practice that would later evolve into his installations.

When asked why he began to make installations, Adéagbo explained: “I interrupted my studies in France and just came home as eldest son in 1971 after my father’s death for a couple of months to help my family reorganize their lives. But they took my passport and did not allow me to finish my degree. I began to lay out objects and my hand‑written texts to appeal to family members and visitors to let me go back to France. I lived on 2500 CFA (≈5 Euros) per month for 23 years, until I was discovered by accident by a French researcher, Jean-Michel Rousset on April 4th 1993. I believe, an artwork doesn't have to be beautiful, yet it has to stir you up, make you think.”

For more than two decades Adéagbo lived modestly in Cotonou, continuing to develop his assemblages without formal recognition. In 1993 he was “discovered” by Jean‑Michel Rousset, who documented his work and introduced it to curator Régine Cuzin in Paris. This encounter led to Adéagbo's first international exhibition in 1994 and marked the beginning of his career on the global art stage.

== Major exhibitions and collections ==
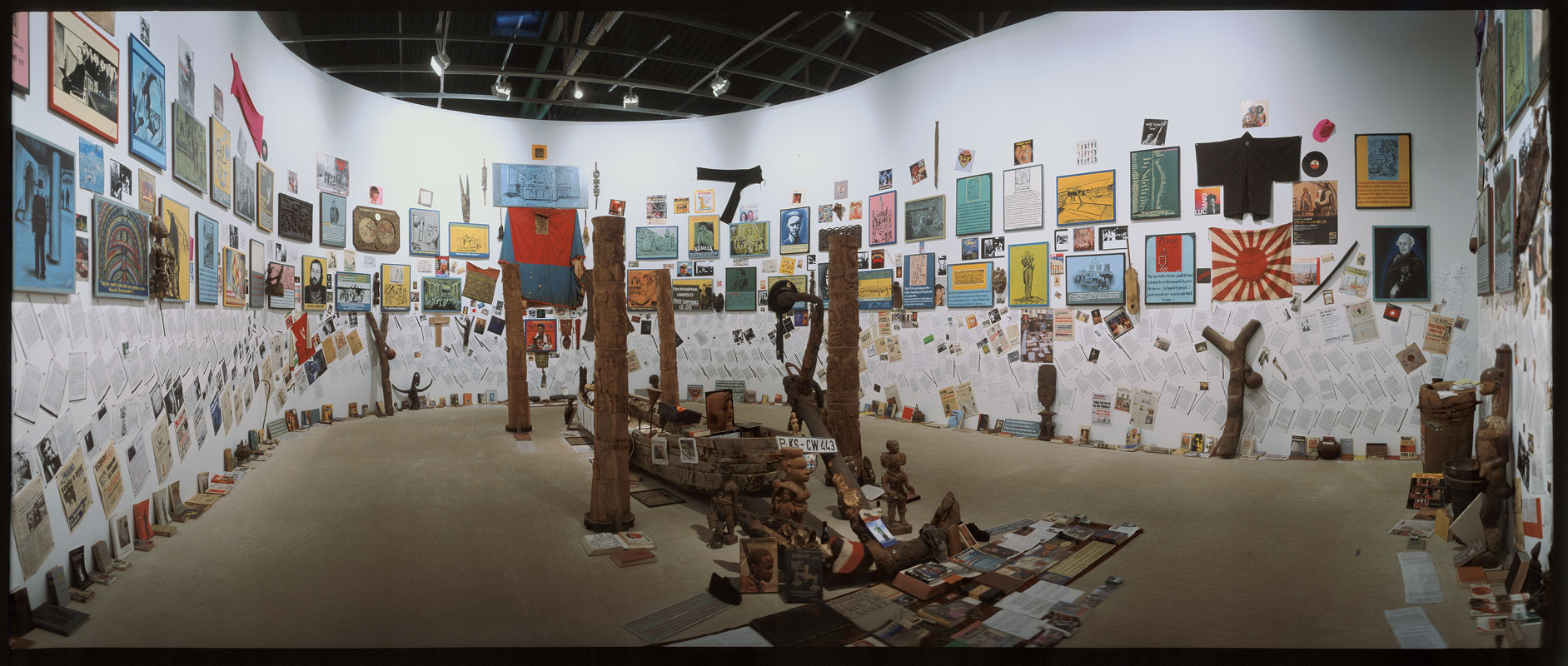
The explorer and the explorers facing the history of exploration – The World Theater (2002), installation detail by Georges Adéagbo. Contribution to Documenta 11, Kassel. Now in the collection of Museum Ludwig, Cologne.

Adéagbo's works have been presented in numerous solo and group exhibitions worldwide. Among his most significant solo shows are Le Quartier (Quimper, 1997), MoMA PS1 (New York, 2000), Museum Ludwig (Cologne, 2004), Ikon Gallery (Birmingham, 2004), Philadelphia Museum of Art (2006), DAAD Gallery (Berlin, 2007), Palazzo Vecchio (Florence, 2008), MAK (Vienna, 2009), MUSAC (León, 2011), Moderna Museet (Stockholm, 2014), Israel Museum (Jerusalem, 2016), Palace of Nations (United Nations, Geneva, 2018), Aby Warburg Haus (Hamburg, 2019), KINDL – Centre for Contemporary Art (Berlin, 2021), Hamburger Kunsthalle (2024), and Galerie Mennour (Paris, 2025).

He has also participated in major group exhibitions, including La route de l’art sur la route de l’esclave (Saline Royale d'Arc-et-Senans, 1994), Dialogues of Peace (United Nations, Geneva, 1995), the Johannesburg Biennale (1997), the São Paulo Biennale (1998), the Venice Biennale (1999, 2009), The Short Century curated by Okwui Enwezor (Munich, 2001), Documenta 11 (Kassel, 2002), Belgique Visionnaire curated by Harald Szeemann (Brussels, 2005), the Paris Triennial (2012), Biennial Regard Benin (2012), the Shanghai Biennale (2016), and exhibitions at the Centre Pompidou (Paris, 2020), Museo Reina Sofía (Madrid, 2023), Bourse de Paris (Pinault Collection), and Centre Pompidou-Metz (2025).

Adéagbo's works are held in major public collections, including the Centre Pompidou (Paris), Pinault Collection, Smithsonian National Museum of African Art (Washington, D.C.), Hamburger Kunsthalle, Museum Ludwig (Cologne), Albertinum (Dresden), Moderna Museet (Stockholm), Kiasma (Helsinki), Nasjonalmuseet (Oslo), Philadelphia Museum of Art, Whitworth Art Gallery (Manchester), Toyota Municipal Museum of Art (Japan), and the Contemporary Art Collection of the Federal Republic of Germany, as well as numerous private collections.

Georges Adéagbo repeatedly says, if you brag about yourself, you end up making yourself small at the same time.

“Alfa, the wise man who gave life to the 26 letters, chose the small i, which is the ninth letter, to put something on it, to give it a hat as the only one among the 26 letters. He who can make himself small will become big, and he who loves to make himself big will become small. Do you see the capital I with a hat...?”

== Films and video documentation ==
- La personne de Georges Adéagbo (2012), dir. Matteo Frittelli – https://vimeo.com/ondemand/georgesadeagbo
- Venise d’hier, Venise d’aujourd’hui (48th Venice Biennale, 1999) – https://vimeo.com/332395404/274108b6f6
- Georges Adéagbo in Wonderland (Documenta 11, 2001–2002) – https://vimeo.com/327769688
- Venice Biennale 2009 – https://www.youtube.com/watch?v=RIZBomFSuxk
- Podcast, National Museum Oslo (2009) – http://www.youtube.com/watch?v=L1xtSIf669g
- MUSAC León – The Mission and the Missionaries (2012) – https://www.youtube.com/watch?v=3uG8INNyOYM
- Adéagbo in Hamburg public space (2014) – https://vimeo.com/107207305
- Moderna Museet Stockholm – The Birth of Stockholm (2014) – https://www.youtube.com/watch?v=FcJzDI1_tg0
- A la rencontre de l’Art (Finkenwerder Art Award, 2017) – https://vimeo.com/243081074
- Jedem sein Kreuz (St. Petri Lübeck, 2018) – https://vimeo.com/321564929
- Interview with Georges Adéagbo (KINDL Berlin, 2021) – https://www.youtube.com/watch?v=Pt3EHvZyNCI
- Gespräch mit Bénédicte Savoy (KINDL Berlin, 2021) – https://www.kindl-berlin.com/artist-talk-adagbo
