= Agu (TV series) =

- Genre: Legal drama
- Written by: Stephanie Dadet; Jemine Edukugho; Uchechukwu William; Uche Ikejimba
- Directed by: Anis Halloway
- Starring: Kanayo O. Kanayo; Ruby Okezie; Mofe Duncan; Iretiola Doyle; Nonso Odogwu
- Theme music composer: Anis Halloway
- Country of origin: Nigeria
- Original languages: English; Igbo
- No. of series: 1
- No. of episodes: 6

Production
- Executive producer: Uche Ikejimba
- Editors: Odokuma Jolomi; Aina Adebayo; Adeyemi Odogun; Obinna Onyenakasa
- Running time: 45 minutes
- Production company: Blink Africa

Original release
- Network: Showmax
- Release: December 14, 2023 – January 18, 2024

Agu is a 2023 Nigerian Showmax Original legal television series directed by Anis Halloway, and written by Stephanie Dadet, Jemine Edukugho, Uchechukwu William, and Uche Ikejimba. The series stars Mofe Duncan, Iretiola Doyle, Nonso Odogwu, with Kanayo O. Kanayo, and Ruby Okezie.

== Plot ==
Agu follows the lives of an estranged father, Etim Inyang, and daughter Victoria Atem as they battle on two opposing sides of the law. When a murder case is presented before the judge. This raises the question: does witchcraft have a case in a court of law?

== Cast ==
=== Main ===
- Iretiola Doyle as Lola Lateef Simpson
- Kanayo O. Kanayo as Etim Inyang
- Ruby Okezie as Victoria Atem
- Mofe Duncan as Sola Awolade
- Nonso Odogwu as Pius

=== Supporting ===
- Vine Olugu as Obinna
- Ozzi Nlemadim as Felix
- Linda Ejiofor as Ugochi
- Tina Mba as Judge
- Ikenna Onyekwena as Barrister Okpe
- Miracle Op as Chima
- Martins Emeka Nwokolo as Uzo
- Detola Jones as Derin
- Taiwo Adejumo Tiza as D-Money
- Stella Chima as Nkiru
- Ajayi Rebecca as Office Secretary
- Confidence Melody Diviport as Feyi

== Episodes ==
Each episode was released weekly for six weeks, every Thursday on Showmax from 14 December 2023 to 18 January 2024.

Season	Episodes	Originally released	
Season	Episodes	First released	Last released
1	6	December 14, 2023	January 18, 2024

=== Season 1 (2023) ===
No.	Title	Original release date
1	TBA	14 December 2023
A man murders his best friend in the forest but insists that he is innocent. A case brings two generations at opposite sides.
2	TBA	21 December 2023
Barrister Etim tries to uncover the relationship between pius and the felix while also trying to stretch an olive branch.
3	TBA	28 December 2023
The mysterious calabash comes with a little prick. Victoria's fantasy gets a reality check. Etim visits a dark place.
4	TBA	4 January 2024
Etim confronts Sola and Victoria and discovers a shocking truth.
5	TBA	11 January 2024
Etim is rushed to the hospital. Victoria shows signs of concern for Etims health. Sola keeps plotting
6	TBA	18 January 2024
Etim gets new information that could change everything. Victoria fights for what rightfully belongs to her. The verdict is given.

== Premiere and release ==
The series premiered on 14 December 2023 and was released to over 50 African countries via Showmax.
