= Al-Qasimi (surname) =

Al-Qasimi is the family name of an Arab dynasty. Other people with the surname include:

- Azza Sultan Al-Qasimi (born 1973), Emirati artist and businesswoman
- Khalid bin Sultan Al Qasimi (fashion designer) (1980–2019), Emirati fashion designer
- Sheikha Najla Al Qasimi (born 1970), Emirati diplomat
