= Nka: Journal of Contemporary African Art =

Academic journal from Cornell University

Nka: Journal of Contemporary African Art is an academic journal concentrating on contemporary art and artists from Africa and the African diaspora from modernist and postmodernist perspectives. It is currently published twice a year by Duke University Press under the auspices of the Cornell University Africana Studies and Research Center.

The journal was founded by Okwui Enwezor in 1994. Along with Enwezor, its founding co-editors are Chika Okeke-Agulu and Salah M. Hassan. In addition, a number of notable artists – such as Coco Fusco, Ibrahim El-Salahi, and Kendell Geers – have served on its editorial and advisory boards.

Nka has received funding from the Andy Warhol Foundation for the Visual Arts and the Prince Claus Fund for Culture and Development.
