= Josiah Jachimike Okonkwo =

Nigerian-born Canadian broadcaster, producer, DJ, and actor

- Born: Josiah Jachimike Okonkwo; 1988 (age 37–38); Owerri, Imo State, Nigeria
- Other name: JJ DeJocular
- Education: University of Nigeria, Nsukka (B.Sc., Botany)
- Occupations: Broadcaster; Producer; Disc jockey; Actor; Model
- Years active: 2004–present
- Known for: Inside Afrobeats, Professor Johnbull, Hudson & Rex
- Spouse: Faith Njoku (m. 2024)
- Website: jjdejocular.com

Josiah Jachimike Okonkwo (born in Owerri, Imo State, Nigeria), known professionally as JJ DeJocular, is a Nigerian-born broadcaster, producer, DJ, and actor based in Canada. He is known for his humorous personality and versatility in entertainment, radio, and television production. He is the host and co-creator of the CBC audio series Inside Afrobeats (2024), and is recognized for his roles in the Nigerian television comedy Professor Johnbull and the Canadian police procedural Hudson & Rex.

== Early life and education ==
Okonkwo was born in Owerri, Imo State, to Ifeanyi and Grace Okonkwo, both of Igbo extraction. He is the youngest of six children. He attended primary school in Owerri, where he participated in debates, sports, and general knowledge competitions. Raised in a Christian household, he took part in church recitations and drama performances.

In 1996, he relocated with his parents to Lagos, completing his primary education at Time & Time Schools and later serving as head prefect in secondary school. He earned a Bachelor of Science degree in Botany from the University of Nigeria, Nsukka in 2010.

Okonkwo married fashion designer and realtor Faith Njoku in a private ceremony in Abuja in 2024.

== Career ==
=== Early career and broadcasting ===
Okonkwo's passion for media began during his secondary school years, where he initiated a "Morning Broadcast" at his school's assembly. His first exposure to radio and television came in 2004 when he organized the Private Secondary Schools Football Games in Lagos, supported by Brila FM and Lagos Television (LTV), where he delivered a live report from the field.

While studying at the University of Nigeria, he joined Lion FM in Nsukka, where he anchored various programs and events. His first broadcast aired on 18 May 2006. After graduating, he was mentored by veteran broadcaster Jika Attoh and joined Blaze FM in Anambra State. There, he hosted Musimag and Blaze Blast, which grew into a popular annual concert featuring artists such as 2Baba, P-Square, Flavour N'abania, Phyno, and Timaya.

In 2014, Okonkwo joined Sunrise FM 96.1 and ETV Channel 50, both under the Enugu State Broadcasting Service, where he produced and hosted 042 Express, featuring international guests such as American gospel singer Don Moen. He later produced and co-hosted the satirical drivetime show Believe It or Not Naija on Urban Radio 94.5, Enugu, alongside comedian MC 4 God. The show, which featured guests including Richard Mofe-Damijo and Ime Bishop Umoh, became one of the top-rated programs in southeastern Nigeria.

After moving to Lagos in 2018, Okonkwo hosted shows for Muse On TV, Priority Radio, and Views Channel. He hosted Weekend Chillout Zone on Cool FM and appeared on other programs such as After Dark with Daddy Freeze and The Road Show. In 2020, he became the head of Africa Tech Radio, where he managed operations and production. During the COVID-19 pandemic, he developed strategies for remote broadcasting and produced the first season of What The Tech Africa, a podcast focused on technology innovation on the continent.

In March 2022, he joined News Central TV as an entertainment presenter and reporter. He remained with the station until relocating to Newfoundland and Labrador, Canada, in 2023.

=== CBC and Inside Afrobeats ===
In 2023, Okonkwo co-produced Inside Afrobeats, an audio series with Katie Rowe and Amy Joy for the Canadian Broadcasting Corporation (CBC). The series explores the history and global influence of Afrobeats. It premiered across CBC Radio One channels in July 2024 and now airs as a syndicated show.

== Acting ==
Okonkwo's acting career began in 2016 with a role in the Nigerian television comedy series Professor Johnbull as Makuachukwu Ilodibe, a perpetual university student. He also served as the voice-over artist for all promotional videos of the series. His film credits include Slave Dancer, High Tension, and Going Bananas.

After relocating to Canada in 2023, Okonkwo appeared in Season 7 of the Canadian television series Hudson & Rex, marking his debut in the Canadian television industry.

== Other ventures ==
=== DJing ===
Okonkwo developed an interest in DJing in the late 1990s, inspired by Lagos radio DJs such as DJ Bombastic, DJ FX2, and DJ Jimmy Jatt. While studying at the University of Nigeria, he created and sold mixes recorded on VirtualDJ software. His passion for music led him to pursue professional DJing. He currently performs at events across Canada and streams live mixes online.

=== Karaoke ===
Okonkwo launched his Karaoke Nite in August 2021 at Lavee Rooftop Lounge, Lekki, Lagos. The success of the event led to offers from several venues, though he limited appearances due to scheduling. The event now holds monthly in St. John's, Newfoundland.

=== Modeling ===
Okonkwo has appeared in several television commercials, notably for the Nigerian telecommunications company Globacom, for which he served as a brand ambassador and voice-over artist between 2016 and 2023. He has featured in music videos by notable Nigerian artists, including Flavour.

=== Other work ===
In addition to entertainment, Okonkwo has worked in healthcare, business analysis, data analytics, project management, and logistics.
