= Nneka the Pretty Serpent =

Nneka the Pretty Serpent may refer to:

- Nneka the Pretty Serpent (1994 film), a Nigerian horror drama film
- Nneka the Pretty Serpent (2020 film), a remake of the above
