= Salah M. Hassan =

Sudanese writer and art critic

- Born: Juba, South Sudan
- Education: University of Khartoum; University of Pennsylvania
- Occupations: Art historian; critic; curator
- Known for: Editor and co-founder of Nka: Journal of Contemporary African Art

Salah M. Hassan is an art historian, critic, and curator specializing in African art and the art and visual culture of the African diaspora. He is distinguished professor of arts and sciences emeritus in Africana studies and the Department of History of Art and Visual Studies at Cornell University. He also serves as director of Cornell's Institute for Comparative Modernities. Hassan is the founding director and current dean of The Africa Institute, as well as chancellor of Global Studies University in Sharjah, United Arab Emirates.

Before joining the faculty at Cornell University in 1993, Hassan taught at the University at Buffalo, the University of Pennsylvania, and the College of Fine and Applied Art in Khartoum, Sudan.

== Early life and education ==
Hassan was born in Juba, South Sudan, and received an undergraduate degree from the University of Khartoum in 1978. He received his M.A. (1984) and Ph.D. in folklore (1984) from the University of Pennsylvania.

== Career ==
Before joining the faculty at Cornell University in 1993, Hassan taught at the University at Buffalo, the University of Pennsylvania, and the College of Fine and Applied Art in Khartoum, Sudan. In addition to his roles at Cornell, Hassan serves as chancellor of Global Studies University and dean of The Africa Institute in Sharjah, United Arab Emirates.

Hassan is an editor and co-founder of Nka: Journal of Contemporary African Art, published by Duke University Press. He has authored, edited, and co-edited several books, including Gavin Jantjes: To Be Free! A Retrospective 1970–2023 (2025), Ahmed Morsi: A Dialogic Imagination (2022), Ibrahim El-Salahi: At Home in the World – A Memoir (2022), Ibrahim El-Salahi: A Visionary Modernist (2012), Darfur and the Crisis of Governance: A Critical Reader (2009), and Art and Islamic Literacy among the Hausa of Northern Nigeria (1992).

Hassan's curated and co-curated exhibitions include Authentic/Ex-Centric at the 49th Venice Biennale (2001), Unpacking Europe at Museum Boijmans Van Beuningen (2001–2002), and The Khartoum School: The Making of the Modern Art Movement in Sudan (1945–Present) at the Sharjah Art Foundation (2016–2017). He also co-curated Kamala Ibrahim Ishag: States of Oneness at Serpentine South in London (2022–2023) with Hoor Al Qasimi and Melissa Blanchflower. More recently, Hassan curated Gavin Jantjes: To Be Free! A Retrospective 1970–2023, presented at Sharjah Art Foundation in 2023–2024 and at Whitechapel Gallery in London in 2024. The Whitechapel presentation was curated in collaboration with Gilane Tawadros and Cameron Foote. Hassan has received several grants and fellowships, including a J. Paul Getty Postdoctoral Fellowship and grants from the Sharjah Art Foundation, Ford Foundation, Rockefeller Foundation, Andy Warhol Foundation for the Visual Arts, and the Prince Claus Fund. In 2021, he was honored as that year's distinguished scholar by the College Art Association (CAA) for his contributions to the field of art history.
