= James Iroha Uchechukwu =

Nigerian photographer (born 1972)

- Born: 1972 (age 53–54); Enugu, Nigeria
- Other names: Uche James-Iroha; Uchechukwu James Iroha
- Education: University of Port Harcourt
- Occupation: Photographer
- Years active: 1996 - Present
- Spouse: Chinwe James Iroha ( m. 2007)
- Father: James Iroha
- Awards: Prince Claus Award 2008

James Iroha Uchechukwu // is a Nigerian photographer. He was born in 1972 in Enugu. He is known for his photography, his support of young photographers, and the passing on of his knowledge to the young. He is also regarded at the beginning of the 21st century as someone that has broadened the horizon of Nigerian photography.

== Early life ==
Uchechukwu is the third child of the popular Nigerian comedian James Iroha, who created the famous TV comedy show "The New Masquerade" and also acted as the character Gringori. He credits his dad as the strongest influence in his works

== Study and career ==
Uchechukwu started to study sculpture in 1990 at the Art Academy of the University of Port Harcourt. He obtained his degree in 1996 and directly afterwards continued study in what is now his current profession, photography. In his work, Uchechukwu melts together the reproduction of common reality with the creative "language" of the imagination, whereby he extends the possibilities of photography and is giving a new direction to local art.

He is co-founder of Depth of Field (DOF), a collective of photographers, artists, and painters. He took the initiative to bring together six talented young photographers to form DOF. He organized several exhibitions of their work in Nigeria as well as abroad. He also teaches photography by giving seminars and workshops.

In 2004, Uchechukwu presented a series of award-winning photos of butcher's shops in the open air in Lagos, with the names Fire, Flesh, and Blood. The photo series initially had a documentary character but got the public's attention as well because of its artistic mélange of colorful and smokey close-ups. The 2008 jury of the Prince Claus Fund describes the photo series as "intense, cruel, powerful, and poetic".

In 2005, Uchechukwu received the Élan Price on the African Photography Encounters in Mali for his work Fire, Flesh and Blood. In 2008, he was honored with a Prince Claus Award from the Netherlands.

== Personal life ==
Uche is a Christian. He met and married his wife, Chinwe, in 2007.

== Exhibitions ==
Uchechukwu participated in several exhibitions, including the following:

- 2005: Depth of Field, South London Gallery, London
- 2005: Un autre monde/Another World: VI Rencontres Africaines de la Photographie, Maison Africaine de la Photographie & Centre de Cultura Contemporània, Bamako
- 2006: 1st Singapore Biennale, Singapore
- 2007: 2nd International Biennial of Contemporary Art of Seville (BIACS 2): The Unhomely: Phantom Scenes in Global Society, Centro Andaluz de Arte Contemporáneo, Seville
- 2007: Lens on Life: From Bamako to San Francisco, Museum of the African Diaspora, San Francisco
- 2008: Travesia, Centro Atlántico de Arte Moderno, Las Palmas de Gran Canaria
- 2008: Snap Judgments, by Okwui Enwezor, Stedelijk Museum, Amsterdam
- 2009: 8th Bamako Encounters, Biennial of African Photography-Borders, Bamako
- 2018: Contesting the Past exhibition, Institute of African Studies. University of Ibadan, Oyo State.
- 2019: A quelle distance est le passé du présent?, LeCentre Benin
