= Global Studies University =

Postgraduate university in Sharjah, United Arab Emirates

- جامعة الدراسات العالمية
- Type: Postgraduate teaching and research university
- Established: 14 September 2023; 2 years ago
- Chancellor: Salah M. Hassan
- President: Hoor Al Qasimi
- Location: Sharjah, United Arab Emirates; 25.352622°N 55.395062°E
- Website: gsu.ac.ae

Global Studies University (GSU; Arabic: جامعة الدراسات العالمية) is a postgraduate teaching and research university in Sharjah, United Arab Emirates, specializing in the humanities and social sciences. It was established in 2023 under an Emiri decree issued by Sultan bin Muhammad Al-Qasimi, ruler of the Emirate of Sharjah.

The university is organized as a network of regional institutes. The Africa Institute, established in 2018, became its first constituent institute in 2023. The university is developing The Asia Institute as its second institute, with additional institutes focusing on the Americas, Europe, and Oceania planned for future development.

== History ==
The university traces part of its institutional history to the first Symposium on African and Arab Relations, held in Sharjah in December 1976. The symposium brought together approximately 45 African and Arab intellectuals and recommended the establishment of an Afro-Arab documentation center in Sharjah.

Africa Hall, which hosted the symposium, was inaugurated in 1976 and later became a venue for conferences, lectures, performances, and other cultural programs.

The Africa Institute was formally established on 6 June 2018 as an institution for research, documentation, and postgraduate study concerning Africa and the African diaspora. It subsequently became the first constituent institute of Global Studies University.

Global Studies University was established under Emiri Decree No. 57 of 2023, issued on 14 September 2023. The university welcomed its first cohort of students in the MA in Global African Studies in February 2025. Its first cohort of Ph.D. students began their studies later that year.

== Governance ==
Hoor Al Qasimi is president of Global Studies University and chair of its Board of Trustees. Salah M. Hassan serves as chancellor of the university and dean of The Africa Institute.

The university's first Board of Trustees was constituted in 2025 and includes academics and representatives from higher education, finance, law, technology, and the arts.

== Academics ==
Global Studies University offers postgraduate degree programs in the humanities and social sciences.

The two-year MA in Global African Studies is housed within The Africa Institute. The program examines Africa, the African diaspora, and their global connections through interdisciplinary study.

The five-year Ph.D. in Global Studies includes coursework and dissertation research across cultural, visual, literary, historical, political, and social fields.

The university also offers certificate courses in Arabic, Amharic, Hausa, and Kiswahili through its Language Program.

== Accreditation ==
Global Studies University is listed as a higher education institution by the Commission for Academic Accreditation of the United Arab Emirates. Its MA in Global African Studies and Ph.D. in Global Studies have received program accreditation from the commission.

== Constituent institutes ==
The Africa Institute, established in 2018, is the university's first constituent institute and focuses on the study and documentation of Africa and the African diaspora.

The university is developing The Asia Institute as its second institute. As of August 2026, it was recruiting faculty and developing academic and research programs concerning Asia and its global connections. GSU also plans additional institutes focusing on the Americas, Europe, and Oceania.

== Campus ==
The university's campus is housed in the former Khalid bin Mohammed School in the Al Manakh district of Sharjah. Established as a boys' school in the mid-1970s, the building was designed by Khatib & Alami as part of a series of public-school prototypes commissioned by the UAE Ministry of Education. Its classrooms are organized around a central courtyard.

Africa Hall, inaugurated in 1976 and reopened following renovation in 2018, also forms part of the university campus. It is used for conferences, symposia, lectures, film screenings, performances, and other university and public programs.

In 2026, Khalid bin Mohammed School was included in the first phase of the UAE's National Register of Modern Architectural Heritage.
