= James Iroha =

Nigerian actor and scriptwriter

OON Chief James Iroha
- Born: James Akwari Udensi Iroha; 12 October 1942
- Died: 28 February 2012 (aged 69); Onitsha, Anambra State.
- Other name: Giringory Akabuogu
- Citizenship: Nigerian
- Education: University Of Ibadan
- Occupations: Actor, Scriptwriter and Director
- Known for: New Masquerade
- Children: Chimela Iroha, James Iroha Uchechukwu
- Honours: Officer of the Order of the Niger (OON)

Chief James Akwari Iroha (OON) (12 October 1942 - 28 February 2012) was a Nigerian actor and scriptwriter. He is popularly known as Giringory a moniker he got from his role Giringory Akabuogu in the comedy television series New Masquerade, which he created.

== Early life And education ==
James was born on the 12 October 1942. He hails from Amaba, Amokwe Item in Bende Local Government Area of Abia State, being one of the several sons of the late Mazi Akwari Iroha. He received his early education in Bukuru, Plateau State, Northern Nigeria, followed by secondary education in Cross River State. He subsequently attended the University of Ibadan for his tertiary education where he studied Theatre Arts in 1966.

== Career ==
James Iroha's career kicked off in 1967 at the Eastern Nigerian Broadcasting Service (ENBS) in Enugu, where he started as a television producer. Over time, he rose through the ranks to become the Director of Television and Deputy General Manager.

His journey into the entertainment world began after the Biafran War. With the nation in a state of despair, he felt an emotional burden to bring joy and laughter back to the people. This vision gave birth to "The Masquerade," a satirical TV drama that initially started as a stage play with a live audience. As its popularity grew, "The Masquerade" transitioned to radio and eventually television as a local content program. Then moved to the Nigeria Television Authority (NTA), where it was rebranded as "The New Masquerade".

== Personal life and death ==
James was married, with five children, namely: Chimela Iroha, James Iroha Uchechukwu, Ugonma Iroha, Kelechi Iroha, and Akwari Iroha.

He died in Onitsha on 28 February 2012, where he was receiving treatment for glaucoma, a condition he had bravely battled for years. The sad news was shared by his son, Akwari, through a Facebook post.

== Honours ==
- In 1981, during the President Shehu Shagari’s regime, he was conferred with the award of Officer of the Order of the Niger (OON).
- In 2017, he was posthumously honoured with the prestigious Rock of Fame Award at the ZUMA Film Festival (ZUFF) in Abuja.

== Filmography ==
- Osuofia and the Wise Men 2 (2008)
- Osuofia and the Wise Men (2008)
- Nneka The Pretty Serpent (1994)

=== Television ===
- New Masquerade
