= Actors Guild of Nigeria =

Nigerian umbrella entertainment trade union

- Abbreviation: AGN
- Type: Trade union
- Headquarters: National Theatre, Lagos, Nigeria
- National President: Alhaji Abubakar Sanusi Yakubu
- Website: www.actorsguildofnigeria.org

The Actors Guild of Nigeria (AGN) is an umbrella union that regulates and represents the affairs of film actors in Nigeria and abroad. The Guild was officially registered in 1998 and the corporate headquarters is located at, Plot 125, Ficus Benjamin Street, Gaduwa Estate, Gudu District, FCT, Abuja with Liaison office at, Suite 29, Block 2, N.C.A.C, Artist village, Iganmu Lagos. The guild is headed by Abubakar Sanusi Yakubu who was sworn in as National President on December 29, 2025. AGN has over one million registered members across 36 states and is the largest actors association in Africa.

The National Executive Council, overseen by the president, includes six vice presidents representing the different geopolitical zones of the country. The State Executive Council is responsible for the affairs of the chapters and each is headed by a chairman. As of December 2025 there are 30 state chapters.

== Past presidents ==
- Zack Orji
- Ejike Asiegbu
- Kanayo O. Kanayo (MFR)
- Segun Arinze
- Ibinabo Fiberesima
- Emeka Rollas MON
