= Chika Okeke-Agulu =

Nigerian artist (born 1966)

- Born: 1966 (age 59–60); Umuahia, Nigeria
- Education: University of Nigeria, Nsukka (MFA, M.A.); University of South Florida (M.A.); Emory University (Ph.D.)
- Occupations: Art historian, artist, curator

Chika Okeke-Agulu is a Nigerian artist, art historian, art curator, and blogger specializing in African and African diaspora art history. He lives in Princeton, New Jersey.

== Early life and education ==
Chika Okeke-Agulu was born in Umuahia in Nigeria in 1966. He studied at the University of Nigeria, Nsukka (BA, First Class Honors, Sculpture and Art History, 1990; MFA, Painting, 1994), University of South Florida (MA, Art History, 1999), and Emory University (PhD, Art History, 2004).

== Career ==
=== Teaching ===
Okeke-Agulu taught at the Yaba College of Technology in Lagos, the University of Nigeria, Nsukka, Penn State University, and was the Clark Visiting professor at Williams College. He is the Director of the Program in African Studies, Director of Africa World Initiative, and Robert Schirmer Professor of Art & Archaeology and African American Studies at Princeton University. In spring 2020 he was appointed the Kirk Varnedoe Visiting professor at the Institute of Fine Arts, New York University. In 2022 he was appointed Slade Professor of Fine Art, Oxford University (2022–2023), and is a Fellow of The British Academy. In 2023, he was appointed Senior Advisor, Modern and Contemporary Art, at Edo Museum of West African Art, Benin City, Nigeria.

=== Writer ===
Okeke-Agulu was a writer and columnist for The Huffington Post, and blogs at Ọfọdunka.

Okeke-Agulu has published articles and reviews in Parkett, African Arts, Glendora Review, Meridians: Feminism, Race, Transnationalism, South Atlantic Quarterly, Artforum International, and Art South Africa. He has contributed to edited volumes, including Reading the Contemporary: African Art from Theory to the Market Place (InIVA, 1999); The Nsukka Artists and Nigerian Contemporary Art (Smithsonian, 2002); The Short Century: Independence and Liberation Movement in Africa, 1945–1994 (Prestel, 2001); Art Criticism and Africa (Saffron Books, 1998); and Is Art History Global? (Routledge, 2007). His books include El Anatsui: The Reinvention of Sculpture (Damiani, 2022), Yusuf Grillo: Painting. Lagos. Life (Skira, 2020), Obiora Udechukwu: Line, Image, Text (Skira, 2016), Postcolonial Modernism: Art and Decolonization in Twentieth-Century Nigeria (Duke UP, 2015), Contemporary African Art Since 1980 (Damiani, 2009), Who Knows Tomorrow (Konig, 2010), Phyllis Galembo: Maske (Chris Boot, 2010), and Ezumeezu: Essays on Nigerian Art and Architecture, a Festschrift in Honour of Demas Nwoko (Goldline & Jacobs, 2012). He is editor of Nka: Journal of Contemporary African Art, published by Duke University Press.

=== Curator ===
Curated Uche Okeke 60th Birthday Anniversary Retrospective at the Goethe-Institut, Lagos. In 1995, he organized the Nigerian section of the First Johannesburg Biennale and co-organized Seven Stories about Modern Art in Africa at the Whitechapel Gallery, London, and Malmö Konsthall, Malmö, Sweden. In 2001, he co-curated The Short Century: Independence and Liberation Movements in Africa, 1945–1994, at the Museum Villa Stuck, Munich, Haus der Kulturen der Welt/Martin-Gropius-Bau, Berlin, Museum of Contemporary Art, Chicago, and PS1/MOMA, New York.

He claims to have served as an Academic Consultant and Coordinator of Platform 4, for Documenta11, Kassel in 2002. In 2004 he co-organized the 5th Gwangju Biennale and Strange Planet at the Georgia State University Art Gallery. He co-organized Life Objects: Rites of Passage in African Art for the Princeton University Art Museum in 2009, and (with Udo Kittelmann and Britta Schmitz), Who Knows Tomorrow, at the Nationalgalerie, Berlin, (2010). In 2019, he co-organized (with Okwui Enwezor), El Anatsui: Triumphant Scale at Haus der Kunst, Munich, MATHAF: Arab Museum of Modern Art, and Kunstmuseum Bern.

== Exhibitions ==
As an artist, Okeke-Agulu has had three solo exhibitions, five joint exhibitions, and twenty-eight group exhibitions in England, Germany, Nigeria, South Africa, South Korea, Sweden, Switzerland, Trinidad and Tobago, and the United States. He participated in the First Johannesburg Biennale (1995). His work is in the collections of the Newark Museum; Iwalewahaus, University of Bayreuth; and the National Council for Arts and Culture, Lagos.

In 2020, Okeke-Agulu called on auction house Christie's to cancel its planned Paris sale of two Igbo sculptures, which were stolen during the Nigeria-Biafra War (1967–1970). The auction went ahead.

== Other activities ==
Okeke-Agulu is a member of the Board of Trustees of the Global Studies University, Sharjah, UAE. He has served on the Board of Directors of the College Art Association, and currently on the board of Princeton in Africa, the Transnational Board of Tate-Hyundai Research Centre, Tate Modern, and on the advisory board of the Africa Institute, Sharjah. He is a member of the Contemporary Art Committee, Philadelphia Museum of Art.

Okeke-Agulu served as chair of the International Jury of the Decolonial Memorial, in Berlin in 2023–2024. In 2024, he served on the International Jury of the 60th Venice Biennale, chaired by Julia Bryan-Wilson.

== Recognition ==
Okeke-Agulu received The Arnold Rubin Outstanding Publication Award, from the Arts Council of African Studies Association (2024); and College Art Association 2016 Frank Jewett Mather Award for Distinction in Art Criticism. He is the recipient, from the African Studies Association, of the 2016 Melville J. Herskovits Award for the most important scholarly work in African Studies published in English in 2015, and Honorable Mention, The Arnold Rubin Outstanding Publication Award, from the Art Council of African Studies Association (2017). In May 2026, he received Princeton University's Howard T. Behrman Award for Distinguished Achievement in the Humanities, the highest honor in the Humanities at the university.
