= Ejezie Emeka Rollas =

Nigerian actor and media personality

- Born: Anambra
- Citizenship: Nigeria
- Education: Federal Polytechnic Oko
- Occupation: Actor/Movie Director
- Organization: Actors' Guild of Nigeria
- Title: President, Actors' Guild of Nigeria

Ejezie Emeka Rollas (MON), also known as Emeka Rollas, is a Nigerian actor and media personality. He is the president of the Actors Guild of Nigeria trade union.

== Early life and education ==
Emeka was born and raised in Anambra State and spent the majority of his childhood in South-Eastern Nigeria. Furthermore, he received his elementary and secondary schooling there. He pursued his academic studies at the famous Federal Polytechnic Oko in Anambra State. There, he studied and earned a Higher National Diploma in Mass Communication in 1993.

== Career ==
Rollas began his career in the Nigerian movie industry, or Nollywood, in 1997 while studying Mass Communication.

On August 22, 2017, he was elected President of the Actors Guild of Nigeria, or AGN. He was reflected on October 31, 2019, and again in 2022. His films include Hilda and The Mighty Woman, Last Warning (2002), Beyond Reason (2004), Douglas My Love (2004), Buried Emotion (2006), and The Thing About Pain (2024).

== Awards ==
He has earned the National Peace Award as “The Most Peaceful Actor” in Nigeria by the Messengers of Peace Agency (2019)
