= Living in Bondage =

1992 Nigerian film

- Directed by: Chris Obi Rapu, Chika Christian Onu
- Written by: Kenneth Nnebue; Okechukwu Ogunjiofor
- Produced by: Ken Nnebue
- Starring: Kenneth Okonkwo; Nnenna Nwabueze; Okechukwu Ogunjiofor; Francis Agu; Bob-Manuel Udokwu; Kanayo O. Kanayo; Rita Nzelu
- Release dates: 1992 (Part 1); 1993 (Part 2)
- Running time: 163 minutes
- Country: Nigeria
- Language: Igbo

Living in Bondage is a Nigerian two-part drama thriller released in 1992 and 1993, respectively, directed by Chris Obi Rapu (part 1) and Chika Christian Onu (part 2), written by Kenneth Nnebue and Okechukwu Ogunjiofor, produced by Ogunjiofor, and sponsored by Jafac Wine. The film starred Kenneth Okonkwo and Nnenna Nwabueze in their breakout roles and is regarded as the first Nigerian home video to achieve blockbuster success.

In August 2015, Charles Okpaleke acquired the rights to Living in Bondage for a period of ten years under his production company Play Entertainment Network. On November 2, 2019, the highly anticipated sequel, Living in Bondage: Breaking Free, premiered in Lagos.

== Plot ==
Andy Okeke and his wife, Merit, face several obstacles – unemployment, infidelity, bankruptcy, and indecent proposals from lecherous admirers, including Merit's boss Ichie Million and Chief Omego. Andy constantly compares his lack of fortune to the success of his peers, especially his old friend Paul. Despite Merit's support and patience, Andy is driven to near-depression, determined to obtain wealth by any means possible, and the slick-talking Paul reveals his secret – a satanic cult where members pledge their loyalty to Lucifer and kill their loved ones in ritual sacrifices, gaining enormous wealth in return. After much hesitation, Andy reluctantly agrees to sacrifice the one person he loves the most – Merit. She dies in hospital days after the ritual, but not before she curses her husband's betrayal.

Andy's sudden affluence and subsequent remarriage three months after Merit's death raise suspicion from his former in-laws, who accuse him of murdering their daughter. He also encounters new problems – the paparazzi's constant interference in his life, his new wife Ego fleeing with his money after he collapses at their traditional wedding, and Merit's ghost haunting and terrorising him when he least expects. Andy would later enter a common-law union with Chinyere, another woman introduced to him by Merit's former friend Caro, but she meets her untimely death after Caro poisons her friend and attempts to escape abroad with the cash Chinyere steals from her husband. Caro is also killed by a hit-and-run driver on her way to the airport, and Paul is murdered by hitmen after Andy holds him partially responsible for his involvement with the cult.

A now frustrated Andy asks the satanic cult for help, but when the Chief Priest insists he can only pacify his late wife's spirit by blinding and castrating himself, he refuses. Andy soon becomes mentally deranged, living as a vagrant under a Lagos flyover until Tina – a former prostitute Andy had previously presented to the cult as a decoy before his deceit was exposed – takes him to her church. He finally confesses to Merit's murder, and Andy's mother weeps at her late daughter-in-law's grave, pleading for her forgiveness.

In the film's final scene Andy, now cured of his insanity, worships with the evangelical Christians who have assured him his sins are forgiven.

== Production ==
Living in Bondage started with a script written by Okechukwu Ogunjiofor but without funding, so he partnered with Keneth Nnebue, a businessman who imported VHS tapes from Taiwan. The film was shot with a VHS camcorder, though not of high production value, the direct to home video was innovative at the time.

== Cast ==
- Kenneth Okonkwo as Andy Okeke
- Nnenna Nwabueze as Merit, Andy's wife
- Okechukwu Ogunjiofor as Paul, Andy's friend and cult member
- Ngozi Nwaneto as Caro, Merit's friend and Paul's girlfriend
- Kanayo O. Kanayo as Chief Omego, cult member
- Francis Agu as Ichie Million, cult member and Merit's boss
- Ngozi Nwosu as Ego, Andy's mistress
- Felicia Mayford as Obidia
- Clement Offiaji as Robert, fraudster
- Chizoba Bosah as Merit's aunt
- Bob-Manuel Udokwu as Mike, cult member
- Chukwudi Onu as Joseph, cult member
- Sydney Diala as cult member/initiator
- Daniel Oluigbo as cult chief priest
- Obiageli Molugbe as cult mother
- Rita Nzelu as Tina, local prostitute
- Jennifer Okere as Chinyere, Caro's friend
- Ruth Osu as Andy and Merit's neighbour
- Grace Ayozie as Andy's mother
- Benjamin Nwosu as Andy's father

Actors Kanayo, Agu, Udokwu, Molugbe, Onu, and Osu were already well-known from the soap opera Checkmate while Okere had a recurring role in the rival series Ripples; their involvement generated considerable publicity for the film. Nwabueze, Nwosu, and Ogunjiofor were the only principal cast members not reprising their roles for the sequel. Although Nwabueze’s character, Merit, appears briefly in a flashback, her ghost is portrayed by a body double. Paul is frequently referenced in the second film but never appears on-screen; his death scene is likewise completed using a body double.

== Sequel ==
In 2015, veteran actors Ramsey Nouah and Charles Okpaleke acquired the rights to Living In Bondage from Kenneth Nnebue for a possible remake, which was to be filmed in Europe and America as well as in Nigeria. The news was later confirmed on Instagram, but the project languished in development hell for three years.

In 2018, Nouah announced his remake had transitioned into a sequel now titled Living in Bondage: Breaking Free, and was released on November 8, 2019, becoming the 11th highest-grossing Nigerian movie. Nouah, who plays the cult's new chief priest, makes his directorial debut, with original actors Okonkwo, Kanayo, and Udokwu, also involved (Udokwu's character was reduced to a single cameo). The story centres on Andy's son Nnamdi and his vaunting quest for wealth like his father before him. Former MBGN Muna Abii makes her acting debut alongside Swanky JKA in his breakout role.

Following its cinematic release, the film premiered on Netflix in May 2020.

== See also ==
- List of Nigerian films of 1992
- List of Nigerian films of 1993
