= Okey Ogunjiofor =

Nigerian actor and producer

- Born: November 12, 1964 (age 61); Ameibu Ebenato, Imo State
- Occupations: Producer; Director; Writer; Actor
- Known for: Living in Bondage Nneka the Pretty Serpent

Okey Ogunjiofor (born November 12, 1964) is a Nigerian Nollywood producer and actor known for co-pioneering the Nigeria movie industry with his film Living in Bondage in 1992. In 2022, his film Amina won the 2022 AMVCA for Best overall movie award category and became the first Nigerian film to be named on a global top ten Netflix list.
