= Chohreh Feyzdjou =

Iranian artist (1955–1996)

Chohreh Feyzdjou (Persian: شهره فیض‌جو, September 5, 1955 – February 17, 1996) was an Iranian artist. She was known for sculpture and installation art; she covered her older works in black pigment and labeled them, then displayed them as you would see in a shop or at the bazaar.

== Biography ==
Chohreh Feyzdjou was born into a Jewish family in Tehran. Her father had changed the family name from Cohen to Feyzdjou, a more common surname for Persian people, in an attempt to blend in. She moved to Paris in 1975, where she studied fine art at the École nationale supérieure des Beaux-Arts. In France, she was told that her surname was unpronounceable and that she should change it.

As of 1989, she began labelling her work with "Product of Chohreh Feyzdjou", each identified with a letter, a serial number and the year. Her pieces are generally coated in black pigment.

Feyzdjou had her work included in exhibitions at the CAPC musée d'art contemporain de Bordeaux and the Galerie nationale du Jeu de Paume. Her work was also included in Documenta11 in 2002.

She died in Paris from a genetic illness at the age of 40.
