= Rita Nzelu =

Nigerian actress

- Born: Ozubulu, Anambra State, Nigeria
- Education: University of Nigeria
- Occupation: Actress
- Years active: 1990–present
- Spouse: Simeon Okoro (m. 2004)
- Children: 2

Rita Nzelu is a Nigerian veteran actress. She is primarily known for her comic roles in films.

== Early life and career ==
Rita Nzelu was born on 2 July 1968 in Ozubulu, Anambra State, Nigeria. She attended University of Nigeria where she earned her degree. Nzelu came to prominence for her role as Tina, a local prostitute turned Christian in Living in Bondage. Since then, she has appeared in over 100 films.

She recently starred in Stigma of Womanhood (2016), Baby Mama (2017), and Wandering Soul (2017) as Patricia.

== Personal life ==
Rita Nzelu married Simeon Okoro in March 2004, and they relocated to the United Kingdom. They have two children. She reportedly separated from her husband in 2018.

== Filmography ==
- Unforgiven
- Back to Sender
- Angel of Darkness
- Baby Mama (2017)
- Wandering Soul (2017) as Patricia
- Stigma of Womanhood (2016) as Ezinna
- Ada Mbano in London (2014)
- Ortega and His Enemies (2014) as Grace Tobi
- International Games (2012)
- Agaba (2009)
- Akpu-Nku (2003) as Ulomma
- Buried Alive (2003)
- Punching Bag (2003)
- Women Affair (2003)
- Sister Mary (2003) as Sister Ijeoma
- The Richest Man (2003)
- Wake Keeping (2003)
- Oga and His Boys (2003)
- Long John (2002)
- Agumba (2002)
- Christian Marriage (2002)
- Beyond the Altar (2002)
- A Cry for Help (2002)
- Terrible Sin (2001)
- Mothering Sunday (2001) as Beatrice
- Never Comeback (2001)
- Ukwa (2001)
- Freedom (1999)
- Obstacles (1998)
- Blind Trust (1997)
- Guilty as Sinned (1997)
- Irony (1997)
- Nneka the Pretty Serpent (1994) as Ifeoma
- Living in Bondage (1992) as Tina
- Wandering Soul (2017) as Patricia
