= Walter Enwezor =

Nigerian professor of Soil Science

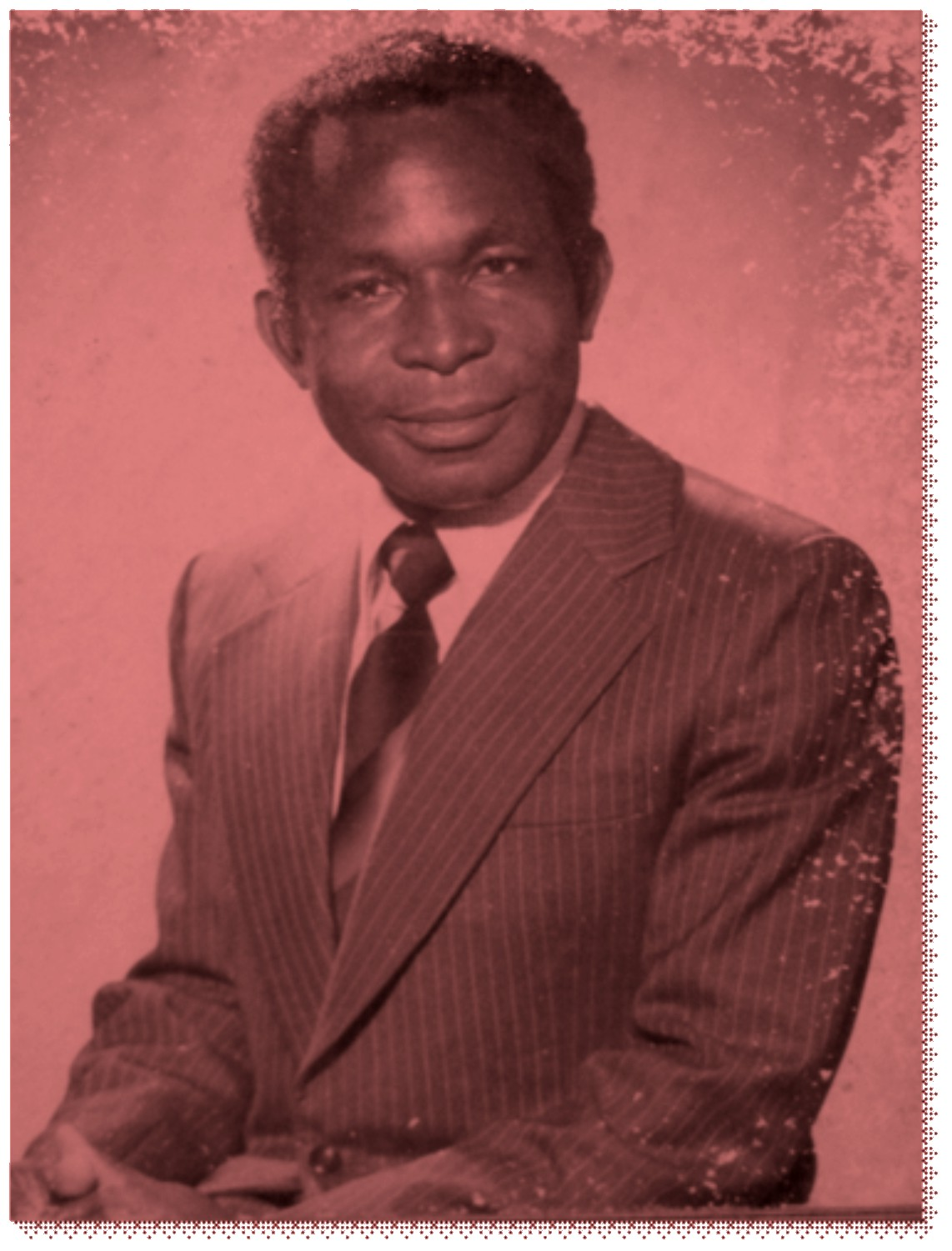
- Born: Walter Okwundu Enwezor; 3 July 1936 (age 90); Awkuzu
- Occupations: Researcher; Academic; Agriculturist

Academic background
- Education: University College, Ibadan; Imperial College, London; University of Nigeria, Nsukka

Academic work
- Institutions: University of Nigeria, Nsukka

Walter Okwundu Enwezor (born 3 July 1936) is a professor of soil science, an agriculturist and former Dean of the Faculty of Agriculture, University of Nigeria, Nsukka (1985 to 1986, and much later in 1997). His administration is notable for introducing the idea of "farm year," which is one year of practical farm work experience by undergraduate students. This idea was adopted by other Nigerian universities. Enwezor was also former President of the Soil Science Society of Nigeria from 1984 1988.

== Early years and education ==
Enwezor was born on July 3, 1936, in Awkuzu, Anambra State. He attended the Church Missionary Society Central School, Awkuzu from 1943 to 1949. Then, he attended the Government College, Umuahia, from 1949 to 1955, and was able to obtain the Cambridge Overseas School Certificate Division One. Enwezor enrolled to study agriculture at the University College, Ibadan, from 1955 to 1962, and utilizing a State Scholarship, he obtained both the bachelor's degree (second class, upper division) in Agriculture (London) and the master's degree in Soil Science (London). In 1962, he gained admission into the Imperial College, London, SW7. He was also awarded a State Scholarship. And he graduated with a PhD in Soil Chemistry in 1964. He was also able to earn the Diploma of Imperial College from the Imperial College, London, that same year.

== Career ==
Enwezor was employed as lecturer in Soil Science in the University of Ibadan (1964–1966). In 1966, just before the Nigerian civil war, he was appointed Lecturer in Soil Science, University of Nigeria, Nsukka. in 1970, he rose to Senior Lecturer and then, in 1976, he became Reader. Walter Enwezor became a professor of Soil Science (Soil Fertility), University of Nigeria, Nsukka in 1978.

== Fellowship and membership ==
Enwezor is member, International Society of Soil Science; member, British Society of Soil Science; Member and Secretary, Soil Science Society of Nigeria (1971 to 1984). He is a member, Agricultural Society of Nigeria; member, Science Association of Nigeria; member, Association for advancement of Agricultural Science in Africa. He was awarded the Commonwealth Academic Fellowship to University of Aberdeen (1975 to 1976).

Enwezor was elected the Dean of the Faculty of Agriculture, University of Nigeria, Nsukka from 1985 to 1986. He was elected Dean again in 1997.

== Recognitions and awards ==
Departmental Prize Award in BSc degree examination (1960). Listed in University of Nigeria Book of Fame (Volume One)

== Personal life ==
Walter Enwezor married Mabel Ifeyinwa Eloji in 1979. They had two sons and four daughters. Okwui Enwezor was his nephew.

== Selected publications ==
The Biological Transformation of Phosphorus during the Incubation of a Soil treated with Soluble Inorganic Phosphorus and with Rotted Organic Materials (it was published in 1966 in Plant and Soil, Vol. 25, pages 463 to 465)

Significance of the C: Organic P Ratio in the Mineralization of Soil Organic Phosphorus (published in 1967 in Soil Science Journal, Vol 103, pages 62 to 66)

(in collaboration with the Royal Tropical Institute, Amsterdam) Cooperative Study of Possibilities of Standardization and Improvement of Soil Testing Methods of Soils from the Humid Tropics, with Emphasis on Soil Phosphate.
