= Professor Johnbull =

Nigerian series

- Directed by: Tchidi Chikere
- Starring: Kanayo O. Kanayo; Queen Nwokoye; Angela Okorie; Osita Iheme
- Theme music composer: Flavour
- Country of origin: Nigeria
- Original language: English
- No. of seasons: 6

Production
- Producer: Tchidi Chikere
- Production locations: Enugu, Enugu State, Nigeria
- Running time: 30 minutes

Original release
- Release: July 19, 2016

Professor Johnbull is a Nigerian comedy TV series, which has 6 seasons. It is based on reviving morals in the Nigerian society. The series premiered on NTA Network, NTA on StarTimes, and NTA International on July 19, 2016. It was later aired on DSTV and GOTV in 2018. The TV series was sponsored by GlobaCom and produced by Tchidi Chikere. Professor Johnbull stars Kanayo O. Kanayo in the lead role from whom it derived the name Professor Johnbull Eriweagwuaagwu Macwigwe, Queen Nwokoye as Elizabeth, Angela Okorie as Nje, the house help, Osita Iheme as Jeroboam, Chinedu Okolie known as Flavour and Korede Bello who are musical artists appeared in some of the TV series.

== Plot ==
It is about the family of Professor Johnbull characterized as a widower, retired professor and a community leader.> Kanayo O. Kanayo acted as Professor Johnbull. The professor's neighbours troop to his house to resolve all sort of issues, his neighbours and community members prefer taking conflicts to his residence because of his expertise in resolving conflicts morally. His residence is full of constant activities of people coming to seek advice from Professor Johnbull on how to settle disputes among themselves. Each episode starts with a conflict, which the Professor resolves and ends with a closing quote encouraging the community to portray good conduct, moral rectitude and always upright in dealing with people.

== Selected episodes of season 1 ==
No.	Title	Directed by	Original release date
1	"Claimant"	Tchidi Chikere	July 19, 2016
In this episode, D'banj suddenly appears at a local restaurant. Fans rush to catch a glimpse of the artist. The professor meets D'banj at the local restaurant and invites him to his house.
2	"Eliza my Daughter"	Tchidi Chikere	July 19, 2016
Professor Johnbull suspects his daughter Elizabeth (Queen Nwokoye) is pregnant because she vomits uncontrollably. Funky Mallam as Mai Doya(yam merchant) seeks advice from Professor Johnbull on how his expectant wife has been vomiting frequently. This made professor Johnbull curious about his daughter's constant vomiting.
3	"Sorting Things"	Tchidi Chikere	July 19, 2016
This episode is on the interesting issues of Lectures receiving bribes in cash or in kind in exchange for unmerited high marks in higher institutions. Flash Boy (Stephen Odimgbe) attempts to bribe his lecturer (Chiwetalu Agu) for unmerited marks to pass his examination. In addition, Caro (Mercy Johnson) who tries to influence her grades by offering Jumoke (Bidemi Kosoko) inducements for higher marks.
4	"Foreign Fuel"	Tchidi Chikere	July 19, 2016
Professor Johnbull (Kanayo O. Kanayo) highlights national issues in a humorous way, while pointing out the dangerous effects of fuel hike and scarcity.
5	"Good Flavour"	Tchidi Chikere	July 19, 2016
Chinedu Okolie popularly known as (Flavour) visits the professor to request a favour. Churchill (Junior Pope), Elizabeth (Queen Nwokoye) and others in the professor's household reacts differently when they saw the star artist.
6	"Half Bread and Puff Puff"	Tchidi Chikere	July 19, 2016
This episodes highlights the issue of dating and marriage among young women, measures desperate women employ for getting a husband in a modern day Nigeria. Malik ( Sani Danja) and Madam Christian (Patience Ozokwor) hilariously shows the meaning of 'half bread and puff'.
7	"Baby and Bomboi"	Tchidi Chikere	July 19, 2016
This episode is about the discrimination against the girl child. Athan receives the news of the birth of his fourth child (a girl), he is not happy about it because he prefers a boy.
8	"Happening Guys"	Tchidi Chikere	July 19, 2016
This episode tackles the rivalry between the 'old schools and modern swag'. (Ayo Makun) a Nigerian comedian featured in this episode
9	"Mobile Dustbin"	Tchidi Chikere	July 19, 2016
O.C. Ukeje as Efosa, Ogus Baba as Samson was featured in this episode alongside other Nollywood actors who accentuated the culture of proper waste disposal and the need for public sanitation.
10	"Beautiful Girls"	Tchidi Chikere	July 19, 2016
This episode examined ways promoters enhance the looks of models with the aid of technology and software applications.(Bovi Ugboma) a Nigerian comedian featured in this episode.

== Cast ==
- Kanayo O. Kanayo in the lead role as Professor Johnbull
- Patience Ozokwor as Madam Christian
- Chika Okpala
- Queen Nwokoye as Elizabeth
- Angela Okorie as Nje
- Queen Nwokoye as Elizabeth
- Osita Iheme as Jeroboam
- Yomi Fash Lanso as Restaurateur
- Funky Mallam as yam seller
- Bidemi Kosoko as Jumoke
- Stephen Odimgbe as Flash boy,
- Imeh Bishop as Etuk
- Mercy Johnson as Caro
- Pope Odonwodo as Churchill>
- Bimbo Akintola as Ufoma
- Martins Nebo as Abenego
- Ayo Makun
- Richard Mofe-Damijo
- Stan kamandi as Athan
- U.C. Ukeje as Efosa
- Sani Danja as Malik
- Bovi Ugboma

== Accolades ==
In 2018, Professor Johnbull was nominated for Best Television Series by Africa Magic Viewers' Choice Awards.
