= Anis Halloway =

Sierra Leonean musicians

Anis Halloway, born on the West Coast of Africa in Sierra Leone, Anis Halloway is a songwriter, music composer, and film director. He likes to call himself a “creative onion” because of his many layers and talents.

Halloway's journey has been nothing short of dynamic. Surviving the civil war in Sierra Leone, he ventured to the UK in 2001 in search of new challenges and a fresh start. There, he dove headfirst into the international music scene, starting with a sound engineering and music production course at Lewisham College in South East London. By 2003, Anis had signed with independent label GDM Records as a songwriter and artist. His promo single “Eyes on Me” received critical acclaim[1. When the label folded, Anis didn't miss a beat. He continued as an independent songwriter and music producer, collaborating with notable artists like Blak Twang, Sway, and Silvastone [https://www.silvastonemusic.com

Fast forward to 2009, Anis decided it was time for another adventure. He returned to his hometown of Freetown, Sierra Leone, to explore new opportunities in media and the arts. That same year, he joined Capital Radio as an on-air personality (OAP) and released his debut album, “Small Beginnings,” featuring hit songs like “Shake’am,” “No One,” and “We Nor Want Dat.”

Later that year, Anis represented Sierra Leone on the Endemol music TV show “Project Fame” in Nigeria, finishing in the top 10 and leaving a lasting impression[6][7][8]. In Nigeria, his love for film and TV reignited, leading him to join the team at Nigezie, one of Lagos's most vibrant entertainment TV stations. There, he wore many hats: TV presenter, scriptwriter, voiceover artist, and playlist supervisor.

Building on his TV success, Anis hosted the maiden edition of Nigerian Idol in 2011, cementing his status as a mainstream presenter[9][10][11]. He also dabbled in acting, with roles in “Tinsel” and “Desperate Housewives Africa.” As A&R/Artist Manager at Sam Kargbo Productions (SKP), he worked with the renowned African boyband X-Project.

Anis continued to make waves as a music producer for African Media Production Network's “Star The Winner Is” and as a talent scout and audition judge for “The Voice Nigeria” in 2014, and as a music director for “I Love Nigeria.” He also worked as a Technical & Creative Consultant and Sound Designer for 76 Media, contributing to its growth and success.

More recently, Anis has directed content for Africa Magic TV, one of the portals of MNET, and Showmax.com, an affiliate online platform, with successful shows like “Hustle,” “Unmarried,” “What Will People Say,” “Shoot Your Shot,” and others[12][13][14]. As he revs up for his next frontier, Anis's eyes are set on expanding and peeling off more creative layers as he explores the world of boundless creativity. Where next? Just stay tuned.
