= New Masquerade =

Nigerian TV show

- Genre: Nigerian sitcom
- Created by: James Iroha
- Written by: James Iroha
- Starring: Chika Okpala; Lizzy Evoeme; Christy Essien-Igbokwe; James Iroha; Romanus Amuta; Claude Eke; Tony Akposheri; David Offor
- Country of origin: Nigeria

Production
- Production locations: Enugu, Nigeria

New Masquerade is a Nigerian sitcom that aired on the Nigerian Television Network on Tuesday nights from 8:30pm to 9:00pm during the mid-1970s until the mid-1990s. It was created and written by James Iroha who also acted in the sitcom. It is one of Nigeria's longest running sitcoms. The TV show started out as radio programme known as "Masquerade" transmitted on the East Central State Broadcasting Corporation, Enugu.

== Synopsis ==
The show started out a segment called "Masquerade" aired on In the Lighter Mood, radio programme of the East Central Broadcasting Corporation. It was created after the civil war as a means to bring laughter to the homes of citizens after the devastation caused by the Nigerian Civil War. The creator was James Iroha who also played Giringori on the TV show.

The protagonist of the show is Chief Zebrudaya, a World War II veteran who has visited various foreign countries and he is perceived by other characters to have attained some level of sophistication and enlightenment. Many of the shows' plot take place in Zebrudaya's sitting room. Zebrudaya has a wife, Ovuleria, a daughter, Philo and two houseboys, Clarus and Giringori. Though a comedy, the show also incorporate melodramatic plots about teaching morals and the consequences of some of society's problems if they are not corrected.

James Iroha and Chika Okpala who played Zebrudaya met in 1972, while they were rehearsing a play Souls and Daughters, which was staged at an ESBS amphi-theatre, located in Enugu. He invited Okpala to join the cast and become the star of the show while himself play as his houseboy Gringory Akabuogu.

== Cast and characters ==
- Chika Okpala as Zebrudaya Okoroigwe Nwogbo Alias 4.30 - is a domineering husband; he has a range of experience as an ex-serviceman and resident in foreign countries. He uses a mixture of Queens English, Igbo language and Pidgin English as a means of communication
- Lizzy Evoeme as Ovuleria - Zebrudaya's submissive wife who takes care of the house and engages in petty trading
- Claude Eke as Jegede Sokoya - Zeburudaya's friend whose arrogance and the quest for easy money is a source of conflict between him and the more honest Zeburudaya. He calls himself a doctor and the youngest millionaire in the universe. He likes to demonstrate his ability to speak in Queens English by using a bombast or pretentious style of speaking, albeit with a thick Yoruba accent.
- James Iroha as Giringory Akabogu' - Houseboy, speaks in Pidgin English with characteristic Calabar accent.
- Christy Essien-Igbokwe as Apena - Sokoya's wife.
- David Offor as Clarus Mgbeojikwe - Giringory's fellow houseboy
- Veronica Njoku as Ramota - Sokoya's second wife. She was written into the script after Christy Essien-Igbokwe decided to leave the series
- Tony Akposheri as Zakky - Jegede's ally in scheming get-rich-quick schemes
- Romanus Amuta as Natty - A greedy man who engages in gossip and dirty tricks

== Reception and critical response ==
The New Masquerade holds a special place in the history of Nigerian television and stands out for not only being entertaining but also educative. It also became a tool for ethnic and cultural integration since three Yoruba character- Jegede, Apena and Ramata in the sitcom are played by actors of Igbo descent.

The sitcom was highly popular in the 80s and early 90s and only started losing its popularity by the advent of Mexican soap operas which the television authorities imported because it was cheaper than producing shows locally

The programme also made the theme song "Eddie Quansa", from the album of Peacock International Band to become quite popular
