= Chika Okpala =

Nigerian comedian (born 1950)

Chief Chika Okpala MFR
- Born: 10 June 1950 (age 76); Ahoada, Rivers State.
- Other name: Zebrudaya
- Citizenship: Nigerian
- Education: Enugu State University of Science and Technology
- Occupation: Comedian
- Years active: 1983 — present
- Known for: New Masquerade

Chief Chika Okpala MFR (born 10 June 1950) is a Nigerian actor and comedian. He is popularly known as Chief Zebrudaya, a sobriquet he got from his role in a TV comedy series, New Masquerade, which aired from 1983 to 1993.

He is considered a veteran in the entertainment industry because of his consistency and contributions. In recognition of his impact, he was honoured in 2017 with the Africa Magic Viewers' Choice Award (AMVCA), presented by MultiChoice through Africa Magic, for lifetime contribution to the development of African cinema.

== Early life and education ==
Okpala was born in Ahoada in present-day Rivers State into a family of nine children in a polygamous family who lived in harmony. He was tutored by his father's friend, whom he served as a houseboy. His father wanted him to be a banker and did everything possible to keep him on that track to achieve his goals. His father’s plan for him was influenced by his background as a businessman. As part of this plan, the young Okpala and his siblings were sent back home to their paternal grandmother in their hometown, Nnobi, in Idemili South Local Government Area of Anambra State, to stay connected to their roots.

Okpala started his formal education journey from standard 1 to 3 in his hometown, Nnobi, before he was brought back to Ahoada to continue his standard 4. But he became a handful and often played truancy with his peers. He would sneak out at night to go to cinemas to see films without his parents knowledge. On one of those occasions, one of his friends got injured while trying to sneak into the cinema house without paying. In turn, his friend's parents confronted his parents because of this incident. His father decided to take him to another village called Join karama, where he stayed with his father's friend who worked at a Baptist hospital and needed someone to stay at home and take care of his son when his wife was at the farm.

Okpala later proceeded to take his common entrance examination and was accepted at the Baptist Day School, Port Harcourt. He also attended Prince Memorial High School at Onitsha, a city in Anambra State, southeastern Nigeria, between 1964 and 1972. He later obtained a Bachelor of Science (B.Sc.) degree in mass communication from the Enugu State University of Science and Technology in 1996.

In 2014, he was among the 700 students that matriculated at National Open University of Nigeria, Enugu State, where he enrolled for the master's programme in business management at the age of 64.

== Career ==
Okpala became popular playing "Chief Zebrudaya alias 4.30" in the popular 80s sitcom New Masquerade. His character portrays a pompous, half-educated champion of the elite who spoke in a characteristic blend of wrong grammar and witty proverbs. The sitcom uses humour to navigate complex societal issues and was a cultural touchstone that helped people with their everyday lives.

== Personal life ==
Okpala is married and has two children, both of whom are married and have children of their own. Although he initially had three children, he lost his eldest daughter. His son, Henry Okpala, is married and has a daughter. He lives and works in Nigeria. There were reports that Okpala had lost his wife, but they turned out to be rumours.

== Awards and honours ==
On 4 March 2017, Okpala won the Africa Magic Viewers' Choice Award (AMVCA) 2017 Industry Merit.

He has also been honoured with a Member of the Order of the Federal Republic (MFR) by the Federal Government of Nigeria for his contributions to the Nigerian entertainment industry.

Okpala is an ambassador of malaria in Nigeria, an ambassador of lepers in Nigeria, and an ambassador of the National Open University of Nigeria.

Okpala holds several traditional titles, including Ezeonunekwuru Ora of Nnobi, Ezekwesili of Akabo Mbaise and Ezeonunekwuru Oha of Aba.

== Filmography ==
- New Masquerade
- Professor Johnbull
- Phone Swap (2012) as Mary's Father
- Lionheart (2018) as Board Member 1
- I Believe (2018) as Pa Joseph
- Dark October (2023) as Village Chief
- savana (2014)
- Ifediche (2023)
