= Documenta11 =

2002 art exhibition in Kassel, Germany

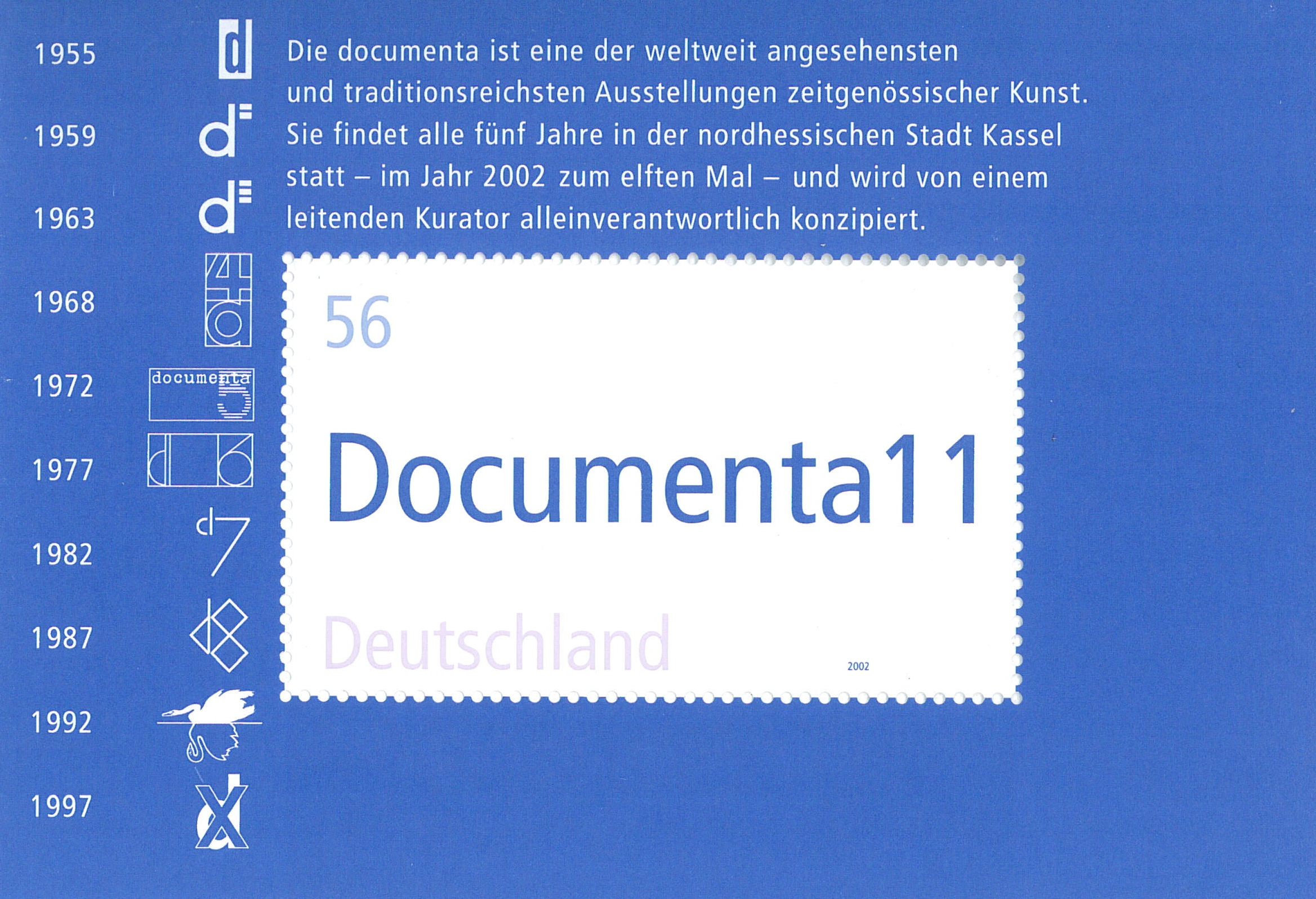
Stamp Documenta XI 2002

Documenta11 was the eleventh edition of documenta, a quinquennial contemporary art exhibition. It was held between 8 June and 15 September 2002 in Kassel, Germany. The artistic director was Okwui Enwezor.

== Participants ==
- A Georges Adéagbo, Ravi Agarwal, Eija-Liisa Ahtila, Chantal Akerman, Gaston André Ancelovici (Colectivo Cine-Ojo), Fareed Armaly, Rashid Masharawi, Michael Ashkin, Asymptote Architecture, Kutlug Ataman, The Atlas Group, Walid Raad
- B Julie Bargmann & Stacy Levy, Artur Barrio, Bernd and Hilla Becher, Zarina Bhimji, Black Audio Film Collective, John Bock, Ecke Bonk, Frédéric Bruly Bouabré, Louise Bourgeois, Pavel Braila, Stanley Brouwn, Tania Bruguera
- C Luis Camnitzer, James Coleman, Constant, Margit Czenki
- D Hanne Darboven, Destiny Deacon, Stan Douglas
- E Cecilia Edefalk, William Eggleston, Maria Eichhorn, Touhami Ennadre, Cerith Wyn Evans
- F Feng Mengbo, Chohreh Feyzdjou, Yona Friedman
- G Meschac Gaba, Giuseppe Gabellone, Carlos Garaicoa, Kendell Geers, Isa Genzken, Jef Geys, David Goldblatt, Leon Golub, Dominique Gonzalez-Foerster, Renée Green, Víctor Grippo, Le Groupe Amos
- H Jens Haaning, Mona Hatoum, Thomas Hirschhorn, Candida Höfer, Craigie Horsfield, Huit Facettes: Dynamique Artistique & Culturelle, Pierre Huyghe
- I Igloolik Isuma Productions (Nunavut: Our Land), Sanja Iveković
- J Alfredo Jaar, Joan Jonas, Isaac Julien
- K Amar Kanwar, On Kawara, William Kentridge, Johan van der Keuken, Bodys Isek Kingelez, Ben Kinmont, Igor and Svetlana Kopystiansky, Ivan Kožarić, Andreja Kulunčić
- L Glenn Ligon, Ken Lum
- M Mark Manders, Fabian Marcaccio, Steve McQueen, Cildo Meireles, Jonas Mekas, Annette Messager, Ryuji Miyamoto, Santu Mofokeng, Multiplicity, Juan Muñoz
- N Shirin Neshat
- O Gabriel Orozco, Olumuyiwa Olamide Osifuye, Ulrike Ottinger
- P Park Fiction, Manfred Pernice, Raymond Pettibon, Adrian Piper, Lisl Ponger, Pere Portabella
- R RAQS Media Collective, Alejandra Riera and Doina Petrescu, Dieter Roth
- S Doris Salcedo, Seifollah Samadian, Gilles Saussier, Christoph Schäfer, Allan Sekula, Yinka Shonibare, Andreas Siekmann, Simparch, Lorna Simpson, Eyal Sivan, David Small
- T Fiona Tan, Pascale Marthine Tayou, Jean-Marie Teno, Trinh T. Minh-ha, tsunamii.net, Joëlle Tuerlinckx, Luc Tuymans
- U Urbonas, Nomeda & Gediminas
- W Jeff Wall, Nari Ward, Ouattara Watts
- Y Yang Fudong
