= Hoor Al-Qasimi =

Emirati art curator

Hoor Al Qasimi (Arabic: حور القاسمي) born in 1980, is an Emirati Sheikha, president and director of the Sharjah Art Foundation and public figure in the art world. Al Qasimi globally represents Middle Eastern art and artists through the Sharjah Biennial.

== Early life and education ==
Sheikha Hoor Al Qasimi was born in 1980 into the ruling family of Sharjah, United Arab Emirates and is the daughter of Sheikh Sultan bin Mohammad Al-Qasimi. At the age of fourteen, she wanted to be a chef and as she grew up her interests shifted to designing furniture. In 2002 she completed her undergraduate studies at the Slade School of Fine Art in London, where she originally thought she wanted to be a painter. She then completed postgraduate studies at the Royal Academy of Arts in 2005, and she earned an M.A. in curating contemporary art from the Royal College of Art, London, in 2008.

== Career ==
In 2009, Hoor Al Qasimi founded the Sharjah Art Foundation which organizes international exhibitions, artist, and curator residencies, commissions, publications, festivals, architectural research, restoration projects, and educational programs. Al Qasimi has been involved with the Sharjah Biennial since 2003, co-curating its sixth edition at the age of 22. Al Qasimi served as the curator for the United Arab Emirates' pavilion at the 56th Venice Biennale in 2015. She was the curator of the 15th Sharjah Biennial in 2023, titled "Thinking Historically in the Present" which was originally to be curated by the late Okwui Enwezor. In 2024 it was announced that she will be the artistic director for the 2026 Biennale of Sydney, she will also serve as the lead for the 2025 Aichi Triennale to be held in Japan.

In June 2024 she presented a clothing collection in London, which built upon her late brother's work in the fashion industry.

== Honors and awards ==
In 2023 Al Qasimi was awarded an Honorary Doctorate from the University for the Creative Arts, Farnham, United Kingdom.

Al Qasimi was named the most influential person in the contemporary art world in 2024, according to ArtReview’s Power 100 list.

== Personal life ==
Her twin brother, Khalid bin Sultan Al Qasimi, was a fashion designer.
