= Kanayo O. Kanayo =

Nigerian actor (born 1962)

Kanayo O. Kanayo MFR
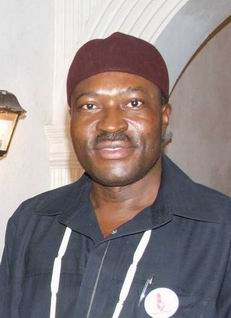
- Kanayo O. Kanayo at the Aka Ikenga dinner event in Lagos, Nigeria, 2008
- Born: Anayo Modestus Onyekwere; 1 March 1962 (age 64); Mbaise, Imo State, Nigeria
- Education: University of Lagos, University of Abuja
- Occupations: Actor, Lawyer
- Years active: 1982- till date
- Spouse: Nneka Onyekwere (m. 1999)
- Children: 4
- Awards: AMVCA Best Actor in a Drama

Anayo Modestus Onyekwere MFR // (born 1 March 1962), known professionally as Kanayo O. Kanayo //, is a Nigerian actor and lawyer. In 2006, he won the Africa Movie Academy Award for Best Actor in a Leading Role for his performance in Family Battle.

== Early life and education ==
Kanayo was born on 1 March 1962. He is a native of Nru Umueze Oboama Ezinihitte in Mbaise Local Government Area of Imo State, Nigeria. Kanayo was raised in Aba, Abia State, where he attended St. Joseph Primary School and later Secondary Technical School. He obtained diplomas in mass communication and law, as well as a bachelor's degree in philosophy from the University of Lagos. He earned a master's degree in political science. In 2018, he obtained a Law degree from the University of Abuja and was called to the Nigerian Bar in 2020.

== Career ==
Kanayo began his acting career in 1982 with productions by the Nigerian Television Authority, appearing in the 1987 television series Things Fall Apart and Checkmate. He made his film debut in 1992 with Living in Bondage. He has starred in over 100 films, including Across the Niger, Lionheart, Up North, Living in Bondage: Breaking Free, and the sitcom Professor Johnbull. He is known for portraying villainous characters, particularly in occult-themed films.

He has also been a president of the Actors Guild of Nigeria.

== Politics ==
In 2011, Kanayo contested the seat for the Ahiazu/Ezinihitte Mbaise Federal Constituency of Imo State in the Nigerian House of Representatives under the All Progressives Grand Alliance (APGA), but was unsuccessful.

In 2013, President Goodluck Ebele Jonathan appointed him to the board of the National Institute for Hospitality and Tourism Studies.

On 7 June 2018, he again declared his intention to run for the same seat in the House of Representatives in the 2019 elections, also under APGA, but did not win.

In 2022, Kanayo announced that he would not contest for any political office, stating that his decision was to "work for a Nigerian president of Igbo extraction."

== Personal life ==
Kanayo married Nneka Onyekwere in 1999. They have four children: Oloaku Valerie, Clinton (also known as Onye Eze Mbaise), Einstein, and Kassochukwu Montell.

== Accolades ==
In 2006, Kanayo won the Africa Movie Academy Award for Best Actor in a Leading Role for Family Battle. Two years later, he was nominated in the same category for his performance in Across the Niger.

He was conferred with the national honour of Member of the Order of the Federal Republic (MFR), and was among the Nigerians honoured by the government in 2014 during the country's centenary celebration. He holds a chieftancy title as Utsu Ufam 01 of Obudu.

== Filmography ==
=== Films ===
Year	Title	Role	Ref
1992	Living in Bondage	Chief Omego	
1993	Circle of Doom		
1994	Nneka the Pretty Serpent	Emeka	
1997	Blood Money: The Vulture Men	Chief Collins	
1997	Rituals		
1998	Blood Money: The Vulture Men 2	Chief Collins	
1998	Full Moon	Daniel	
1999	Festival of Fire		
1999	Chains	Julius	
1999	In Seven Days	Innocent	
2000	Battle of Love	Dubem	
2000	419 Connection: Deadly Rose		
2000	Ngene: The Mistake of the Past Millennium		
2001	Kids Are Angry	Mensa	
2002	Evil-Doers	Solomon	
2003	Billionaire's Club	Don	
2004	Across the Niger	Dubem	
2005	Money is Money	Andy	
2005	End of Money	Etiokwe	
2006	Before Ordination	Ilodibe	
2007	Cover Up	Sam	
2008	Sin No More	Eric	
2009	Lost Desire	Nana Sarpong	
2014	Apaye	Emman	
2014	October 1	Okafor	
2016	A Little Lie	Tony	
2017	Celebrity Marriage	Mr. Gabriel	
2018	Up North	Chief Otuekong	
2018	Lion Heart	Igwe Pascal	
2019	Living in Bondage: Breaking Free	Chief Emeka Omego	
2021	Detour		
2022	Unexpected	Chief Maduka	
	Almajiri	Broker	
2023	Charlie and the Boys	Charles Omokwe	
2023	Finding Odera	Chief Micheals	
2023	Zarz End		
2023	Áfàméfùnà: An Nwa Boi Story		
2024	Out of Breath	Obioha	
2024	Dear God	Pastor	

=== TV shows ===
Year	Title	Role	Ref
1984-88	Village Headmaster		
1991-94	Checkmate	Okosun	
	Ripples		
	New Masquerade		
2016	Professor Johnbull	Professor Johnbull	
2023–present	Agu	Etim Inyang	
2024	Life and Dirt	Chief Obi	

== Awards and nominations ==
Year	Award	Category	Work	Result	Ref
2006	Africa Movie Academy Awards	Best Actor in a Leading Role	Family Battle	Won	
2008	Africa Movie Academy Awards	Best Actor in a Leading Role	Across the Niger	Nominated	
2012	Africa Movie Academy Awards	Special Recognition Award	—N/a	Won	
2014	Africa Movie Academy Awards	Best Actor in a Leading Role	Apaye	Nominated	
2014	Golden Icons Academy Movie Awards	Best Actor	Apaye	Won	
2014	Golden Icons Academy Movie Awards	Best On-Screen Duo	Apaye	Nominated	
2014	Best of Nollywood Awards	Best Actor in Leading Role (English)	Apaye	Nominated	
2014	Nigeria Entertainment Awards	Best Actor in a Lead Role	Apaye	Nominated	
2019	Africa Movie Academy Awards	Best Actor in a Supporting Role	Up North	Nominated	

== See also ==
- List of Nigerian actors
- Nigerian Law School
