= Khalid bin Sultan Al Qasimi (fashion designer) =

Emirati fashion designer (1980–2019)

- Khalid bin Sultan Al Qasimi in 2019
- Born: 6 April 1980; Sharjah, United Arab Emirates
- Died: 1 July 2019 (aged 39); London, England
- Education: Central Saint Martins (BA)
- Occupation: Fashion designer
- Known for: Qasimi fashion label
- Father: Sultan bin Muhammad Al-Qasimi
- Website: qasimi.com

Khalid bin Sultan Al Qasimi (Arabic: خالد بن سلطان القاسمي; 6 April 1980 – 1 July 2019), known professionally as Khalid Al Qasimi, was an Emirati royal and fashion designer in London who founded the Qasimi fashion label. He was the second son of Sultan bin Muhammad Al-Qasimi, who has been ruler of the Emirate of Sharjah since 1972. Al Qasimi died in London on 1 July 2019.

== Early life and education ==
Al Qasimi was born on April 6, 1980. He moved to London at nine years old and was educated at the Tonbridge School in Kent. In 2004, Al Qasimi won two golden prizes in the First Arab-Euro Festival for Photography organised by the Arab Photographers Union in Europe under the theme of "History, technique and heritage." Al Qasimi studied architecture and fashion design at Central Saint Martins in London.

== Career ==
He established the British clothing chain Qasimi Homme in 2008. There he was the founder and creative director. As fashion designer he is best known for having incorporated Arab elements in his male and female costume designs. Much of Al Qasimi's women's collection was inspired by the Gulf’s colourful jalabiya dresses. Al Qasimi said models should "resemble warriors walking out of a crypt and down the runway." His designs have been shown as part of London and Paris Fashion Weeks. Some celebrities who have worn Qasimi outfits include Lady Gaga, Florence Welch and Cheryl Cole.

In an interview with Japan Fashion TV Al Qasimi said: "Qasimi is a way for me to discuss what's going on around us whether it is politics or economics". Some of his designs included £115 ($144) T-shirts with writing in Arabic that read: "Press. Don't Shoot."

Al Qasimi was the chairman of the Sharjah Urban Planning Council as well as the leader of the region’s first international platform for architecture, the Sharjah Architecture Triennial – a non-profit initiative funded by the Government of Sharjah, to focus on encouraging dialogue on architecture and urbanism in the Middle East, North Africa, and South Asia – set to take place at the end of 2019.

== Personal life ==
Khalid bin Sultan Al Qasimi was the son of Sheikh Sultan bin Muhammad Al-Qasimi, the current ruler of Sharjah, and hailed from the emirate's royal Al Qasimi family. According to the official biography of Sharjah ruler Sheikh Sultan bin Mohamed Al Qasimi, he had three sisters, one half-sister and a half-brother. His twin sister, Hoor bint Sultan Al Qasimi, is the director of the Sharjah Art Foundation.

Khalid's older half-brother, Sheikh Mohammed bin Sultan Al Qasimi, died of a heroin overdose in 1999 at the family's English manor house in Sussex.

Al Qasimi was found dead in his London penthouse apartment in Knightsbridge on 1 July 2019. Three days of national mourning across the UAE were declared, beginning with flags to be flown at half-mast. He was laid to rest on 3 July at Jubail Cemetery. His father posted images and a video of the funeral prayers on Instagram. During his funeral his father was flanked by his fellow rulers, including Sheikh Saud bin Saqr Al Qasimi, ruler of Ras Al Khaimah, Sheikh Humaid bin Rashid Al Nuaimi, ruler of Ajman, and Sheikh Ammar bin Humaid Al Nuaimi, Crown Prince of Ajman, Sheikh Saif bin Zayed Al Nahyan, deputy prime minister and minister of interior, and Sheikh Nahyan bin Mubarak Al Nahyan, minister of tolerance.

On 11 December 2019, a hearing was held at Westminster Coroner's Court about the circumstances of Al Qasimi's death. Al Qasimi had spent his final hours on the night before his death partying according to the toxicology report by Dr Susan Patterson he had high levels (more than 300 mg) of the sex-drug GHB and cocaine in his system. Detective Sergeant Adrian De Villiers, who investigated his death, stated: ″There is no suggestion of anybody acting in a way to give or make Khalid take these drugs″. Relatives of the Prince were not present. Coroner Bernard Richmond QC gave a verdict of drugs-related death.
