= Nneka the Pretty Serpent (1994 film) =

- Directed by: Zeb Ejiro
- Written by: Zeb Ejiro
- Starring: Ndidi Obi; Eucharia Anunobi; Rita Nzelu; Sam Loco
- Production companies: Klink Studios; Videosonic Studios
- Release dates: 1994 (Part 1); 1995 (Part 2)
- Running time: 120 minutes
- Country: Nigeria
- Language: Igbo

Nneka the Pretty Serpent is a two-part 1994 Nigerian horror drama film directed and written by Zeb Ejiro and produced by Okechukwu Ogunjiofor. It is regarded as the Nollywood movie that started the trend of storylines involving demon-possessed subjects who are cleansed by pastors.

== Plot ==
Nneka the Pretty Serpent tells the story of a woman who desperately wants to conceive a child of her own. In her quest to become pregnant, she seeks the help of the river goddess, also known as Mami Wata. In return for this assistance, she promises to dedicate the child to the river goddess. The woman subsequently conceives and gives birth to a female child named Nneka.

Nneka possesses supernatural powers, which she uses to perpetrate evil. Her aim is to seduce prominent married men in order to take their money and souls. Nneka is possessed by the Queen Mother spirit and is tasked with killing six people who had taken her powers. Each of these individuals has a specific weakness: the first is addicted to women, while the second, Fatima, is addicted to perfume.

== Cast ==
- Ndidi Obi as Nneka
- Okechukwu Ogunjiofor as Tony Chukwudifu Nwosu
- Eucharia Anunobi
- Ngozi Ezeonu as Nkechi
- Rita Nzelu as Ifeoma 'Ify'
- Sam Loco as Mazi Nwosu
- Kanayo O.Kanayo as Emeka
- James Iroha as Chima Ogbonna
- Claude Eke as Nneka's husband
- Nelly Uchendu as Mama Nwosu
- Zack Orji
- Chima Anyamkpa as Reverend
- Chima Ezeobi as C.Y.
- Ify Igidi as Ebere
- Oleh Nnenna as Ethel
- Collins Onyenze as Kalu

== Production and release ==
The film was shot in Igbo with English subtitles. It was set in Lagos.

== Reception ==
The film achieved commercial success despite being shot in Igbo language and subtitled in English Language. Movies such as Karishika, Sakobi, Izaga, Highway to the Grave, and Witches were said to have been influenced by Nneka the Pretty Serpent.

== Remake ==
The remake of Nneka the Pretty Serpent was announced in January 2020 by Charles Okpaleke of Play Network Studios. It was released in cinemas in December 2020 and distributed by Genesis Cinemas and Nairabox. Ndidi Obi was also featured in the remake.
