= Kenneth Okonkwo =

Nigerian actor (born 1968)

- Born: 6 November 1968 (age 57); Nsukka, Enugu State, Nigeria.
- Other name: Arinzechukwu
- Education: University of Nigeria Nsukka
- Occupations: Actor; politician
- Notable work: Living in Bondage
- Political party: Independent (as of 11/2/25)
- Spouses: Ogechi Ezekiel (m. 2000; div. 2002) Ifeoma Okonkwo (m. 2007)
- Awards: the Africa Movie Academy Award on a Special Recognition of Pillars of Nollywood

Kenneth Okonkwo (listern; born 6 November 1968) is a Nigerian actor, lawyer and politician, known for his role in the movie Living in Bondage as Andy Okeke. He was born in Nsukka, Enugu State, Nigeria, to Ozioko Francis Okonkwo and Beatrice Okonkwo.

== Education ==
Okonkwo's educational journey began with his primary education, followed by his first higher learning qualifications from St. Theresa College. He then attended the University of Nigeria, where he earned a degree in Business Administration and Law (LLB). Furthering his studies, he obtained a Master's degree in International Law and Diplomacy from the same institution, he also obtained a Fellowship from the Chartered Institute of Economics.

In addition to his formal education, Okonkwo also pursued theological studies at the Nigerian Bible School, earning a certificate in Theology and training as a Bible scholar and Minister of God.

== Career ==
In 2013, he won the Africa Movie Academy Award on a Special Recognition of Pillars of Nollywood. In 2015, he was given a special recognition award by the organisers of the City People Entertainment Awards for his contribution to the growth of entertainment in Nigeria.

In October 2022, the Labour Party (Nigeria) announced Okonkwo, alongside Ndi Kato, Nana Kazaure, Yunusa Tanko, Dele Fatorimi, and Ime Ufot, as the official spokespersons for the Peter Obi and Yusuf Datti presidential campaign. In February 2025, Okonkwo announced his exit from the Labour Party, claiming it was not ready for the 2027 elections.

== Personal life ==
He was first married to Ogechi Ezekiel, daughter of Pastor Ezekiel, General Overseer of Christian Pentecostal Mission International, in 2000. Their union was blessed with a son, Ifeanyi, but unfortunately ended in divorce two years later.

Okonkwo found love again and married his current wife, Ifeoma, with whom he shares a son, Kenechukwu Isaac Chukwuchirimeze Okonkwo.

== Filmography ==
| s/n | Movie | Year | Role |
|---|---|---|---|
| 1. | Ploy (Etan) | 2021 | Chibuike |
| 2. | Dear Affy | 2020 | Additional Crew |
| 3 | Living in Bondage: Breaking Free | 2019 | Andy Okeke |
| 4. | The British Expert | 2019 | Harry |
| 5. | iBelieve | 2018 | Buchi |
| 6. | Wives On Strike: The Revolution | 2017 | Baba Ngozi |
| 7. | 16th Anniversary | 2017 | Jeffery |
| 8. | Wives on Strike | 2016 | Baba Ngozi |
| 9. | Amanda my Village Wife | 2015 | Chinemelum |
| 10. | 41Love | 2015 | Philip |
| 11. | Heart of a Saint | 2012 | Charles |
| 12. | Heart of a Saint 2 | 2012 | Charles |
| 13. | Just in Case | 2012 | Alex |
| 14 | Heart of a Widow | 2011 | Nuel |
| 15. | Heart of a Widow 2 | 2011 | Nuel |
| 16. | Royal King | 2011 | |
| 17. | Royal King 2 | 2011 | |
| 18. | Weeping Soul | 2011 | Martins |
| 19. | Weeping Soul 2 | 2011 | Martins |
| 20. | King of Kings | 2009 | |
| 21. | King of Kings 2 | 2009 | |
| 22. | King of Kings 3 | 2009 | |
| 23. | Final Tussle | 2008 | |
| 24. | Kingdom of Men | 2008 | Dike |
| 25. | Kingdom of Men 2 | 2008 | |
| 26. | The Return of Ogidi | 2008 | Ogidi |
| 27 | The Return of Ogidi 2 | 2008 | |
| 28. | 666 (Beware the End Is at Hand) | 2007 | Pastor Chucks |
| 29. | 666 (Beware the End Is at Hand) 2 | 2007 | |
| 30. | African Soldier | 2007 | |
| 31. | African Soldier 2 | 2007 | |
| 32. | Divine Grace | 2007 | Bob |
| 33. | Divine Grace 2 | 2007 | |
| 34. | Greatness | 2007 | |
| 35. | Greatness 2 | 2007 | |
| 36 | Sins of the Heart | 2007 | |
| 37. | Sins of the Heart 2 | 2007 | |
| 38. | The Last Tradition | 2007 | |
| 39. | The Last Tradition 2 | 2007 | |
| 40 | The Revelation | 2007 | George |
| 41 | The Revelation 2 | 2007 | George |
| 42. | The Signs of End Time | 2007 | Pastor Chucks |
| 43. | The Signs of End Time 2 | 2007 | |
| 44. | The Trinity | 2007 | |
| 45. | The Trinity 2 | 2007 | |
| 46. | Titanic Tussle | 2007 | Owolabi |
| 47. | Titanic Tussle 2 | 2007 | |
| 48. | Trumpet of Death | 2007 | Nwabueze |
| 49. | Trumpet of Death 2 | 2007 | Nwabueze |
| 50. | Village Destroyers | 2007 | Nwabueze |
| 51 | Village Destroyers 2 | 2007 | Nwabueze |
| 52. | Across the River | 2006 | Mike |
| 53. | Across the River 2 | 2006 | Mike |
| 54 | Angel in Hell | 2006 | Ken |
| 55. | Angel in Hell 2 | 2006 | |
| 56. | Explosion: Now or Never | 2006 | Steve |
| 57. | Explosion 2: Now or Never | 2006 | |
| 58. | Explosion 3: Now or Never | 2006 | |
| 59. | My Promise | 2006 | |
| 60 | My Promise 2 | 2006 | |
| 61 | Sacred Blood | 2006 | Fred |
| 62 | Sacred Blood 2 | 2006 | |
| 62. | The Biggest Boy in Town | 2006 | |
| 63. | The Biggest Boy in Town 2 | 2006 | |
| 64. | The Devil in Her | 2006 | |
| 65. | The Devil in Her 2 | 2006 | |
| 66. | The Golden Fish | 2006 | Ben |
| 67. | The Golden Fish 2 | 2006 | |
| 68. | The Hard Solution | 2006 | |
| 69. | End of Money 1 & 2 | 2005 | Charles |
| 70. | Windfall 1& 2 | 2005 | |
| 71. | A Million Madness | 2004 | Gentility |
| 72. | Beyond Reason | 2004 | Ben |
| 73. | Government House 1 & 2 | 2004 | |
| 74. | Inheritance | 2004 | Ogbonna |
| 75. | My Desire 1 & 2 | 2004 | |
| 76. | Treasure 1 & 2 | 2004 | |
| 77. | World Apart 1& 2 | 2004 | Promise |
| 78 | Naomi | 2003 | Nduka |
| 79. | To Love a Thief | 2003 | Raymond |
| 80. | Holy Ghost Fire | 2001 | Daniel |
| 81. | The Suitors | 2000 | |
| 82. | Oganigwe | 1999 | Prince Onyema |
| 83. | Arusi-Iyi | 1998 | Chief Danco |
| 84. | Living in Bondage 2 | 1993 | Andy |
| 85 | Living in Bondage | 1992 | Andy |

== See also ==
- 9th Africa Movie Academy Awards
