= Okwui Enwezor =

Nigerian-born American curator (1963–2019)

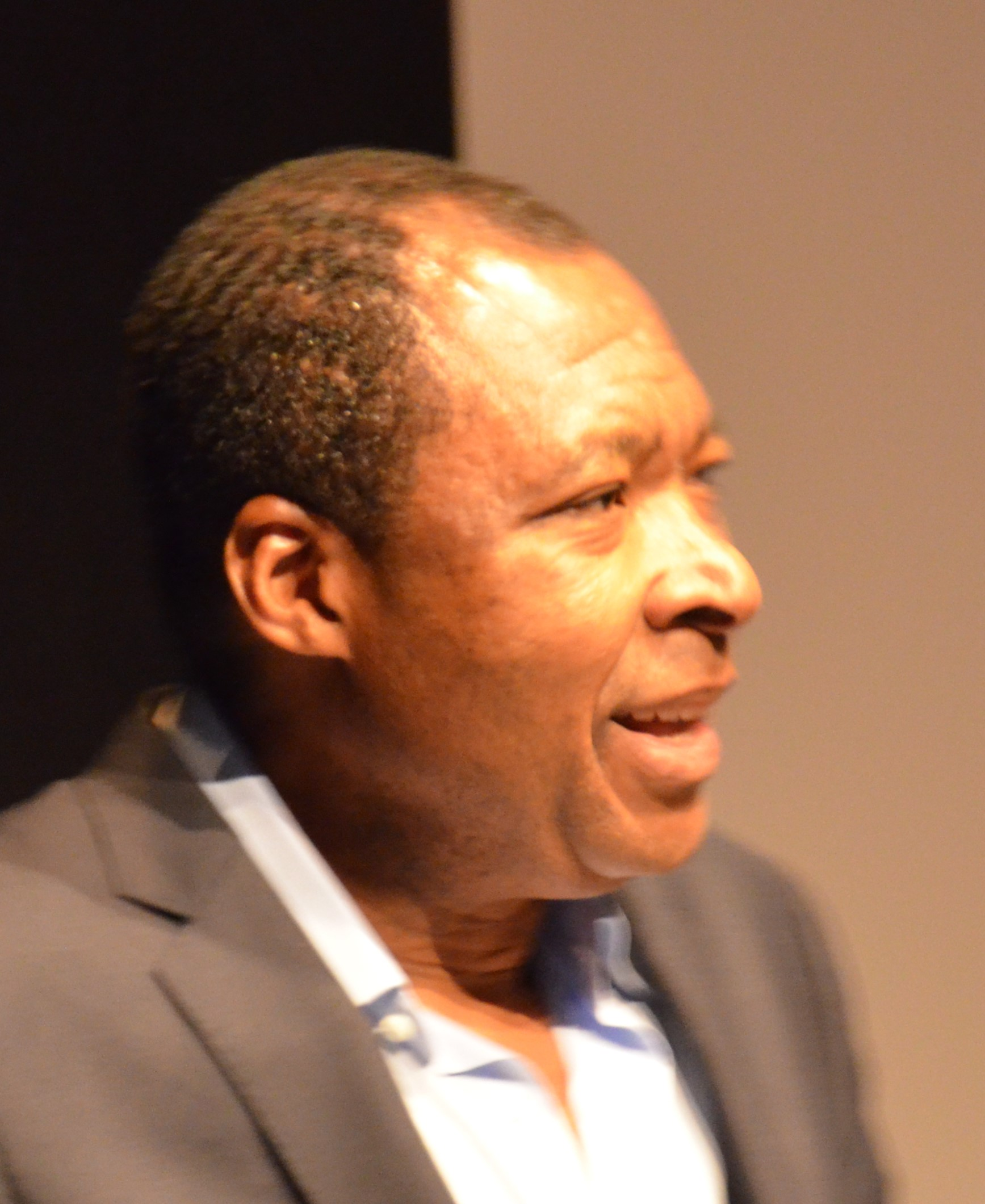
- Born: Okwuchukwu Emmanuel Enwezor; 23 October 1963; Calabar, Nigeria
- Died: 15 March 2019 (aged 55); Munich, Germany
- Education: New Jersey City University (BA)
- Occupations: Curator, academic administrator
- Spouse(s): Jill S Davis (divorced); Muna El Fituri (divorced)
- Children: 1

Okwui Enwezor // (23 October 1963 – 15 March 2019) was a Nigerian curator, art critic, writer, poet, academic administrator, and educator, specializing in art history. Enwezor served as artistic director of several major exhibitions, including Documenta11 (2002) and the 2015 Venice Biennale, becoming the first non-European and African-born curator to lead both. He was director of Munich's Haus der Kunst from 2011 to 2018. Enwezor was also the founding editor of Nka: Journal of Contemporary African Art and held numerous academic appointments. In 2014, he was ranked 24 in the ArtReview list of the 100 most powerful people of the art world. He lived in New York City and Munich. Enwezor died in 2019 after a prolonged battle with cancer.

== Biography ==
Okwui Enwezor (pronounced /ɛnˈweɪzər/ en-WAY-zər) was born on October 23, 1963, to Okwuchukwu Emmanuel Enwezor in Calabar, the capital city of Cross River State in south-south Nigeria. He was the youngest son of an affluent Igbo family from Awkuzu, Anambra State in the southeastern part of Nigeria. He is related to Walter Enwezor. Okwui Enwezor moved around several times with his family on account of the civil war before settling in Enugu where he spent most of his formative years. He commenced tertiary education at the University of Nigeria, Nsukka (UNN) but, in 1982, at the age of 18, he moved to the Bronx, New York, and transferred to the New Jersey City University, where he earned a Bachelor of Arts degree in political science.

When Enwezor graduated, he moved to downtown New York City and took up poetry. He performed at the Knitting Factory and the Nuyorican Poets Café in the East Village. Enwezor's study of poetry led him through language-based art forms such as Conceptual Art to art criticism. Teaming up in 1993 with fellow African critics Chika Okeke-Agulu and Salah Hassan, Enwezor launched the triannual Nka: Journal of Contemporary African Art from his Brooklyn apartment; "Nka" is an Igbo word that means art but also connotes to make, to create. He recruited scholars and artists such as Olu Oguibe and Carl Hancock Rux to edit the inaugural issue and write for it.

After putting on a couple of small museum shows, Enwezor had his breakthrough in 1996 as a curator of In/sight, an exhibit of 30 African photographers at the Guggenheim Museum. In/sight was one of the first shows anywhere to put contemporary art from Africa in the historical and political context of colonial withdrawal and the emergence of independent African states.

He died in 2019 following a years-long battle with cancer.

== Curator ==
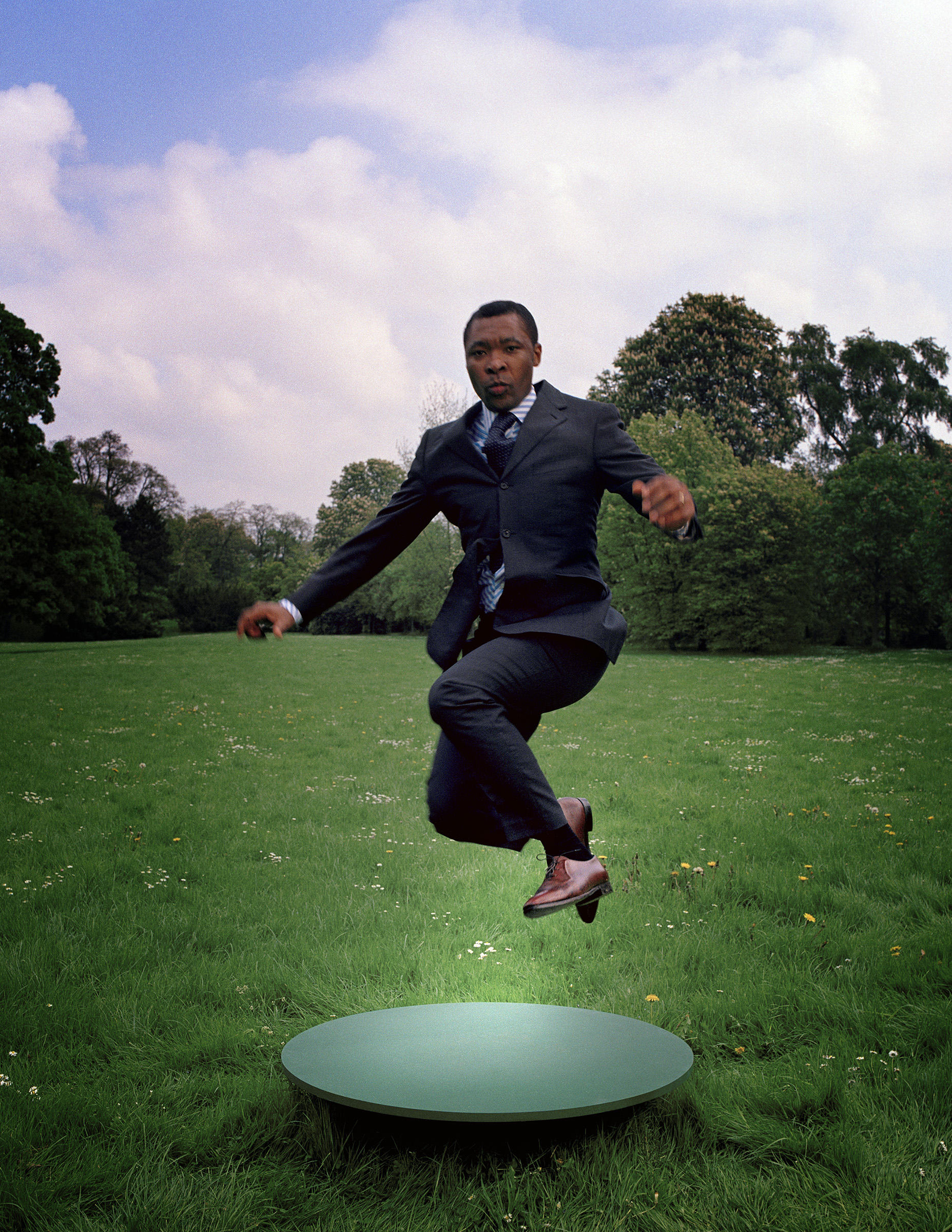
Okwui Enwezor photographed by Oliver Mark, Kassel 2002

Enwezor was the director of the Haus der Kunst, Munich, Germany. His appointment as an African curator in 2011 was seen as symbolically significant given the museum’s Nazi origins. While his tenure was artistically impactful, it was also marked by financial instability, administrative restructuring, and controversies involving staff misconduct and alleged Scientologist infiltration. On 4 June 2018, Enwezor resigned as director of Haus der Kunst due to health reasons, with his contract officially dissolved days earlier. Bavarian culture minister Marion Kiechle praised his tenure as director, crediting his curatorial leadership with elevating the museum’s global reputation through ambitious exhibitions like Postwar: Art Between the Pacific and the Atlantic, 1945–1965.

Enwezor also had the roles of adjunct curator of the International Center of Photography in New York City, and Joanne Cassulo Fellow at the Whitney Museum of American Art, New York City. In 2013, he was appointed curator of the 2015 Venice Biennale, making him the first African-born curator in the exhibition's 120-year history.

Previously, Enwezor was the artistic director of the Documenta 11 in Germany (1998–2002), as the first non-European to hold the job. He also served as artistic director of the 2nd Johannesburg Biennale (1996–97), the Bienal Internacional de Arte Contemporáneo de Sevilla, in Seville, Spain (2006), the 7th Gwangju Biennale in South Korea (2008), and the Triennale d’Art Contemporain of Paris at the Palais de Tokyo (2012). He also served as co-curator of the Echigo-Tsumari Sculpture Biennale in Japan; Cinco Continente: Biennale of Painting, Mexico City; and Stan Douglas: Le Detroit, Art Institute of Chicago.

Enwezor was named an adjunct curator at the Art Institute of Chicago in 1998. He also curated numerous exhibitions in many other distinguished museums around the world, including Events of the Self: Portraiture and Social Identity, The Walther Collection, Germany; Archive Fever: Uses of the Document in Contemporary Art, International Center of Photography; The Short Century: Independence and Liberation Movements in Africa, 1945–1994, Villa Stuck, Munich, Martin-Gropius-Bau, Berlin, Museum of Contemporary Art Chicago, and P.S.1 and Museum of Modern Art, New York; Century City, Tate Modern, London; Mirror’s Edge, Bildmuseet, Umeå, Sweden, Vancouver Art Gallery, Vancouver, Tramway, Glasgow, Castello di Rivoli, Turin; In/Sight: African Photographers, 1940–Present, Guggenheim Museum; Global Conceptualism, Queens Museum, New York, Walker Art Center, Minneapolis, Henry Art Gallery, Seattle, List Gallery at MIT, Cambridge; David Goldblatt: Fifty One Years, Museum of Contemporary Art, Barcelona, AXA Gallery, New York, Palais des Beaux-Arts, Brussels, Lenbachhaus, Munich, Johannesburg Art Gallery, Johannesburg, and Witte de With, Rotterdam.

He organized The Rise and Fall of Apartheid for the International Center for Photography, New York, in 2012, co-curated with Rory Bester and "Meeting Points 6", a multidisciplinary exhibition and programs "which took place in nine Middle East, North African and European cities, from Ramallah to Tangier to Berlin", then at the Beirut Art Center in April 2011. His last exhibition, El Anatsui: Triumphant Scale, co-curated with Chika Okeke-Agulu, opened on 8 March 2019 at the Haus der Kunst, Munich, before it opened at Mathaf: Arab Museum of Modern Art on 30 September 2019.

Enwezor served on numerous juries, advisory bodies, and curatorial teams including: the advisory team of Carnegie International in 1999; Venice Biennale; Hugo Boss Prize, Guggenheim Museum; Foto Press, Barcelona; Carnegie Prize; International Center for Photography Infinity Awards; Visible Award; Young Palestinian Artist Award, Ramallah; and the Cairo, Istanbul, Sharjah, and Shanghai Biennales. In 2004 he headed the jury for the Artes Mundi prize, an award created to stimulate interest in contemporary art in Wales. In 2012, he chaired the jury for Vera List Center Prize for Art and Politics. He was also a member of the jury that selected Isa Genzken for the Nasher Prize in 2019.

In February 2021, the exhibition Grief and Grievance: Art and Mourning in America, which was created by Enwezor, opened at the New Museum in New York. The exhibition was presented through the assistance from Naomi Beckwith, Massimiliano Gioni, Glenn Ligon, and Mark Nash.

The journL Nka devoted a special issue to Enwezor, Issue 48 from May 2021, and in 2022 the Sharjah Biennial curated an edition with proposed themes from Enwezor.

== Teaching ==
From 2005 to 2009, Enwezor was Dean of Academic Affairs and Senior Vice President at San Francisco Art Institute. He held positions as Visiting Professor in art history at University of Pittsburgh; Columbia University, New York; University of Illinois Urbana-Champaign; and University of Umeå, Sweden. In the Spring of 2012, he served as the Kirk Varnedoe Visiting Professor at Institute of Fine Arts, New York University.

== Publications ==
As a writer, critic, and editor, Enwezor was a regular contributor to numerous exhibition catalogues, anthologies, and journals. He was the founding editor and publisher of the critical art journal Nka: Journal of Contemporary African Art established in 1994, and currently published by Duke University Press.

His writings have appeared in numerous journals, catalogues, books, and magazines including: Third Text, Documents, Texte zur Kunst, Grand Street, Parkett, Artforum, Frieze, Art Journal, Research in African Literatures, Index on Censorship, Engage, Glendora, and Atlantica. In 2008, the German magazine 032c published a somewhat controversial interview with Enwezor, conducted by German novelist Joachim Bessing.

Among his published books are Contemporary African Art Since 1980 (Bologna: Damiani, 2009), co-authored with Chika Okeke-Agulu, Antinomies of Art and Culture: Modernity, Postmodernity, Contemporaneity (Durham, NC: Duke University Press, 2008), Reading the Contemporary: African Art, from Theory to the Marketplace (MIT Press, Cambridge and INIVA, London) and Mega Exhibitions: Antinomies of a Transnational Global Form (Wilhelm Fink Verlag, Munich), Archive Fever: Uses of the Document in Contemporary Art, and The Unhomely: Phantom Scenes in Global Society. He is also the editor of a four-volume publication of Documenta 11 Platforms: Democracy Unrealized; Experiments with Truth: Transitional Justice and the Processes of Truth and Reconciliation; Creolité and Creolization; Under Siege: Four African Cities, Freetown, Johannesburg, Kinshasa, Lagos (Hatje Cantz, Verlag, Stuttgart).

== Awards and recognitions ==
In 2006, Enwezor received the Frank Jewett Mather Award for art criticism from the College Art Association. Enwezor was ranked 42 in ArtReview's guide to the 100 most powerful figures in contemporary art: Power 100, 2010. In 2017, he was awarded the International Folkwang-Prize for his great services in promoting art and making it accessible to a wide public.

== Bibliography ==
- "From South Africa to Okwui Enwezor", Centro Atlántico de Arte Moderna, 1998.
- Carol Becker, "Interview with Okwui Enwezor" in Art Journal, 1998.
- Carol Becker, "A Conversation with Okwui Enwezor" in Art Journal, 2002.
- Okwui Enwezor, "Life and Afterlife in Benin", about Alex Van Gelder's twentieth-century African photography collection. Phaidon Press, London, 2005.
- "James Casebere speaks with Okwui Enwezor", La Fábrica, 2008.
- "Interview with Okwui Enwezor" in BaseNow: Mixing business with pleasure, 27 March 2009 (2 parts).
- Okwui Enwezor, "Documentary / Verite: Bio Politics, Human Rights, and the Figure of Truth in Contemporary Art" in The Green Room: Reconsidering the Documentary in Contemporary Art #1, eds Lind, Maria; Hito Steyerl. Sternberg Press (Berlin: 2009), pages 62–104.
