= Inale =

2010 film by Jeta Amata

- Theatrical release poster
- Directed by: Jeta Amata
- Screenplay by: Andy Howard; Adam Mason Johnny Odeh
- Produced by: Keke Bongos
- Starring: Caroline Chikezie; Hakeem Kae-Kazim; Dede Mabiaku; Nse Ikpe Etim; Ini Edo; Omawumi Megbele; Keppy Ekpeyong; Mbong Amata
- Cinematography: James M. Costello
- Edited by: Ben Barnes; Lindsay Kent
- Music by: Joel Goffin (score); Bongos Ikwue (songs)
- Production company: BIK Entertainment
- Release date: 22 October 2010
- Running time: 90 minutes
- Country: Nigeria
- Language: English
- Budget: US$1 million (est)

Inale is a 2010 Nigerian musical drama film produced by Keke Bongos and directed by Jeta Amata. The film which stars Caroline Chikezie and Hakeem Kae-Kazim in lead roles, is set in Otukpo and tells the tale of Inale and Ode, who are both in love with each other but their love is threatened by tradition as Ode must win a customary wrestling tournament before he can take Inale's hand in marriage.

The film premiered in Lagos on 22 October 2010 and was met with mixed reception. It received five nominations at the 7th Africa Movie Academy Awards and eventually won the category for Achievement in Soundtrack. Inale has been said to be very similar to a folktale about Idomaland.

== Plot ==
Odeh and Princess Inale are in love. However, according to the customs of the land, Odeh has to wrestle several other suitors of Inale in order to be able to have Inale's hand in marriage. Odeh wrestles several men and wins in all the fights; King Oche, the King of Otukpo and Inale's father declares Odeh the winner. Just before the wrestling ceremony ends, a masked stranger appears and challenges Odeh to a fight; the Stranger wins and he's revealed to be Prince Agaba, a Prince from Apah, a nearby village, which has been in a long rift with Otukpo. The king reluctantly declares the new winner and tells Prince Agaba that his wife would be escorted to his village the next day.

Inale is thrown in sorrow through the night, but the king refused to compromise despite pleas from the Queen, Ochanya and other palace people. Next day, Inale tells Odeh affirmatively that she'll come back to him, as she's escorted by her sister, Princess Omei and her maid, Omada to Apah. During a break in their journey, in Omei's absence Omada pushes Inale into the river to drown and lies to Omei that Inale has committed suicide. The ladies eventually conclude that Omada pretends to be Inale to Prince Agaba and the people of Apah, who doesn't know what the princess looks like, so as to avoid a war between the two communities. The duo arrive in Apah, with Omada disguised as Inale and Ome as a maid; As soon as Omada is Queen, she begins to maltreat Omei. Omei as a result tries to open up to the people about the state of things, but no one would believe her.

One of the guards in Apah recognizes Omei to be a princess and sets her free from the dungeon Omada has put her in. Omei returns to the river where Inale drowned, and Inale who is now a mermaid appears to her; Inale tells her everything Omada did to her and reveals that she can't leave the river, lest she dies. At another time, Odeh in his grief wanders to the same river, and he sees Inale. She tells him that for her to be able to be with him, he has to challenge Prince Agaba for a re-match and defeat him; only then can she be freed, and if this is not done before the next sunset, Inale would be gone forever. Odeh duels with Agaba once again and he is defeated twice, before Odeh finally defeats Agaba. Agaba hands over Omada to Odeh, and Odeh announces to everyone the true Identity of Omada. Odeh and Agaba rush to the river and rescue Inale, while Omada runs into the forest and was never seen again. Inale and Odeh get married, while Prince Agaba also marries Omei, and the two villages unite to become one great Nation.

== Cast ==
- Caroline Chikezie as Inale
- Hakeem Kae-Kazim as Ode
- Dede Mabiaku as King Oche
- Ini Edo as Omada
- Keppy Ekpeyong as Prince Agaba
- Lola Shokeye as Princess Omei
- Eunice Philips as Queen Ochanya
- Mbong Amata as Keke
- Nse Ikpe Etim as Ori
- Omawumi Megbele as Ene

== Production ==
The film was shot on location in Benue and Los Angeles, California.

== Music and soundtrack ==
Inale Soundtrack

Soundtrack album by Bongos Ikwue
- Genre: Film soundtrack
- Length: 44:55
- Label: BIK Studios
- Producers: Double X Band (songs); Joel Goffin (score)

Joel Goffin chronology
Peace Through Education (2010)	Inale (2010)	Black Gold (2011)

The background music of Inale was composed and scored by Joel Goffin. The film features original songs from Bongos Ikwue, who composed the songs. Some songs were also written by Jeta Amata. All the songs were recorded at BIK Studios, Nigeria.

=== Track listing ===
No.	Title	Singer(s)	Length
1.	"Kankuche"	Bongos Ikwue	3:16
2.	"Echeune"	Bongos Ikwue	5:52
3.	"Wulu Wulu"	Bongos Ikwue, Omei Bongos-Ikwue	3:00
4.	"Dreaming"	Omawumi Megbele, Nse Ikpe Etim, Mbong Amata	2:13
5.	"Ella"	Bongos Ikwue	2:11
6.	"Tomorrow"	Caroline Chikezie, Lola Shokeye, Eunice Philips, Dede Mabiaku	5:08
7.	"Cock Crow at Dawn"	Bongos Ikwue	3:06
8.	"Inale"	Bongos Ikwue	1:18
9.	"Thinking"	Bongos Ikwue	1:58
10.	"Inale"	Jessica Bongos-Ikwue	1:01
11.	"Can't Hurry the Sunrise"	Caroline Chikezie	2:29
12.	"Inale"	Omei Bongos-Ikwue	2:50
13.	"Can't Hurry the Sunrise"	Bongos Ikwue	5:12
14.	"Still searching"	Bongos Ikwue	5:21
Total length:			44:55

== Release ==
The theatrical trailer of Inale was released on 23 June 2010. It premiered in Lagos on the 22 October 2010 and had an Abuja premiere on 28 October 2010. It got theatrical release in November in selected cinemas across Nigeria. It also had a rerun during the 2011 through 2012 Christmas and New Year celebration period. The film was released much later in South African theatres on 26 July 2012.

== Reception ==
=== Critical reception ===
Inale received mixed reviews; while it was praised for its beautiful production, it was criticized for its storytelling. Victor Olatoye of Nollywood Critics gave it 4 stars and stated: " If you crave for a well produced traditional Nollywood movie I suggest you see Inale. This is one Nollywood movie anyone could enjoy. The visuals were beautiful, the actors acted effortlessly". He praised the cinematography, editing and sound of the film, but talked down on the music, which he feels isn't traditional enough. Elnathan John, on the other hand, commended the music but faulted the scripting and the choreography of the dance and fight scenes. He concluded by stating: "It is a tremendously ambitious attempt at producing a musical. The effort is commendable; however its ambitiousness seemed to be its undoing. More time and resources seemed to be pumped into the production to the detriment of the very basis of the film - the script. Lazy scripting, good production, lack of attention to important detail; Certain unimportant details seemed to get the attention, almost as if the director wants more [sic] to impress the Nigerian audience than to make a good film". Osugo Joshua-Karis gave it 7 out of 10, stating: "Inale is touching a story of love, fighting tradition. All in all, Inale is a great movie for relaxation".

=== Accolades ===
Inale received five nominations at the 7th Africa Movie Academy Awards; including awards for Best Nigerian Film, Achievement in Soundtrack, Achievement in Visual Effects, Achievement in Makeup and Achievement in Costume Design. It eventually won the award for Achievement in Soundtrack. It also received five nominations at the 2011 Best of Nollywood Awards and won the category for "Best Soundtrack of the Year". The film got four nominations at the 2011 Nigeria Entertainment Awards and also won "Most Entertaining Film" category at the 2011 Monaco Charity Film Festival Awards.

Complete list of Awards
Award	Category	Recipients and nominees	Result
Africa Film Academy (7th Africa Movie Academy Awards)	Best Nigerian Film	Jeta Amata	Nominated
Africa Film Academy (7th Africa Movie Academy Awards)	Achievement in Soundtrack	Joel Goffin, Bongos Ikwue	Won
Africa Film Academy (7th Africa Movie Academy Awards)	Achievement in Visual Effects	Thomas R. Dickens, Clint Nitkiewicz Hernandez	Nominated
Africa Film Academy (7th Africa Movie Academy Awards)	Achievement in Makeup	Temisan Etsede	Nominated
Africa Film Academy (7th Africa Movie Academy Awards)	Achievement in Costume Design	Jane Unogwu	Nominated
Best of Nollywood Magazine (2011 Best of Nollywood Awards)	Cinematography of the Year	James M. Costello	Nominated
Best of Nollywood Magazine (2011 Best of Nollywood Awards)	Best Use of Costume	Jane Unogwu	Nominated
Best of Nollywood Magazine (2011 Best of Nollywood Awards)	Director of the Year	Jeta Amata	Nominated
Best of Nollywood Magazine (2011 Best of Nollywood Awards)	Soundtrack of the Year	Joel Goffin, Bongos Ikwue	Won
Best of Nollywood Magazine (2011 Best of Nollywood Awards)	Best Sound in a Film	Martin Kittappa, Justin Scott Dixon	Nominated
Nigeria Entertainment Awards (2011 Nigeria Entertainment Awards)	Best Actor In A Film	Hakeem Kae-Kazim	Nominated
Nigeria Entertainment Awards (2011 Nigeria Entertainment Awards)	Best Actress In A Film	Caroline Chikezie	Nominated
Nigeria Entertainment Awards (2011 Nigeria Entertainment Awards)	Best Picture	Jeta Amata	Nominated
Nigeria Entertainment Awards (2011 Nigeria Entertainment Awards)	Best Directing In A Film	Jeta Amata	Nominated
Monaco Charity Film Festival (2011 Monaco Charity Film Festival Awards)	Most Entertaining Film	Jeta Amata	Won

== See also ==
- List of Nigerian films of 2010
