= Maureen Okpoko =

Nigerian actress

- Occupation: Actress
- Years active: 2010 to present
- Children: 3

Maureen Okpoko // is a Nigerian actress. In 2016, she was nominated for Africa Movie Academy Award for Best Actress in a Supporting Role.

== Career ==
In 2013, she starred in Golden Egg, which also featured Justus Esiri. In a 2015 interview, she revealed that Duplex was the most challenging role she has played. Speaking about what she can't do in a film, she stated that she wouldn't act nude, mainly because she would not look nice unclothed. Okpoko has also featured in several Nigerian television series including Dear Mother, Clinic Matters, Neta, University Mafias, Sorrowful Child, Sacrifice the Baby, Red Scorpion, and Baby Oku. In 2015, she acted alongside Majid Michel and Beverly Naya in The Madman I Love. Okpoko was also one of the cast members in Uche Jombo's Good Home (2016), which featured Okey Uzoeshi and Seun Akindele. The film plot addressed human trafficking from the Nigerian perspective

== Personal life ==
Okpoko is a native of Anambra State. She is of Nigerian and Jamaican descent. She is married with three children.

== Filmography ==
- The Duplex (2015)
- The Banker (2015)

== See also ==
- List of Nigerian actors
