= Keke Bongos =

Nigerian film producer and entrepreneur

- Born: Keke Bongos-Ikwue
- Occupations: Film producer, entrepreneur
- Years active: 2010–present
- Known for: Producing the film Inale (2010)
- Notable work: Inale
- Parent: Bongos Ikwue (father)

Keke Bongos Ikwue is a Nigerian film producer and entrepreneur. She produced the award-winning musical movie Inale (2010), The film received international attention and won the award for Achievement in Soundtrack at the 7th Africa Movie Academy Awards.

Keke Bongos is the daughter of Nigerian musician Bongos Ikwue, a highlife and folk music icon from Benue State. In an interview with Vanguard, she stated that the inspiration behind Inale was to reintroduce her father's music to a wider audience.

She serves as the Managing Director of BIK Entertainment, the production company behind Inale. The film was directed by Jeta Amata and starred Caroline Chikezie, Hakeem Kae-Kazim, Ini Edo, Nse Ikpe-Etim, and many other stars.

== Early life and education ==
Bongos was born in Nigeria and later moved to the United States for her tertiary education. She attended University of Maryland, College Park, where she earned a Bachelor of Science (BSc) degree in Elementary Education in 2001. She later returned to the university and obtained a Master of Business Administration (MBA) degree in 2006.

== Career ==
=== Film production ===
Bongos rose to prominence in the Nigerian film industry as a producer associated with the musical drama Inale (2010), directed by Jeta Amata. The film featured Nigerian and international actors including Caroline Chikezie and Hakeem Kae-Kazim. It was inspired by the cultural heritage linked to the Idoma people and the music of Bongos Ikwue. The film was noted for its high production values and received attention at film screenings and festivals. The film was also nominated at the Africa Movie Academy Awards in multiple categories.

=== Entrepreneurship ===
Bongos is reported to be involved in agribusiness advocacy and sustainable development initiatives in Nigeria. She is associated with a natural skincare brand, Kayganics, which focuses on organic shea butter products sourced from local communities.

She has also been described in some sources as participating in consultancy and empowerment initiatives related to agriculture and women/youth development in Nigeria.

== Filmography ==
Year	Title	Role	Notes
2010	Inale	Producer	Musical Drama
2022	The Many Colors of Bongos Ikwue	Executive Producer	Documentary

== Awards and nominations ==
Year	Award	Category	Work	Result
2011	Africa Movie Academy Awards (AMAA)	Best Soundtrack	Inale	Won
2011	AMAA	Best Nigerian Film	Inale	Nominated
2011	Monaco Charity Film Festival	Best Film	Inale	Won
