= Creative Africa Exchange =

Creative Africa Exchange (CAX) is a platform and event bringing together African creatives from different industries to explore business opportunities. Its focus is on music, film, and fashion. It has been described as "Africa's first continental event dedicated to promoting exchange within the creative and cultural industry." The first event was held in Kigali, Rwanda in January 2020.

== CAX WKND 2020 ==
The Creative Africa Exchange Weekend (CAX WKND 2020) was organized by Times Multimedia and sponsored the Africa Export-Import Bank (Afreximbank), the African Union, UNESCO. It was attended by over 1,500 participants from 68 countries. It recorded an estimated $2 billion worth of investment and trade deals. Guests included actors Djimon Hounsou, Omotola Jalade Ekeinde, Richard Mofe-Damijo and musician D'banj.

During the event, Afreximbank announced a $500 million commitment to the African creative and cultural industry.
