= Bongos Ikwue =

Nigerian musician

- Born: Bongos Ikwue; 6 June 1942 (age 84); Oturkpo, Benue State, Nigeria
- Origin: Benue state, Nigeria
- Genres: Highlife. Soul
- Occupation: Singer
- Years active: 1973–present
- Labels: Bongos & The Groovies

Bongos Ikwue (born 6 June 1942) is a Nigerian singer and songwriter known for his fusion of Afrobeat, highlife, folk, and blues.

== Early life ==
He was born on 6 June 1942 at Oturkpo, Benue State, Nigeria. His musical journey began in his youth, forming his first band, the Cubana Boys, during his time at Okene Comprehensive Secondary School. He later attended Ahmadu Bello University in Zaria where he formed the UniBello Brothers and participated in a folk group led by university lecturers. In 1967, he founded Bongos & The Groovies, a band that gained popularity in Nigeria during the 1970s and 1980s.

== Career ==
Ikwue's music features melodies and lyrics that address themes such as love, unity, and social issues. Notable songs in his discography include "Cock Crow At Dawn," "Still Searching," "Tell My Girl," "Amen," and "Otachikpokpo." "Cock Crow At Dawn" was used as the theme song for a Nigerian television soap opera that aired into the 1990s. In 2008, Ikwue released the album Wulu Wulu, which included collaborations with his daughters, Omei and Jessica Ikwue.

Ikwue received the African Movie Academy Award (AMAA) for Best Soundtrack in 2011 for his contributions to the film Inale, released in 2010. The film is a Nigerian musical drama produced by his daughter, Keke Bongos Ikwue, and directed by Jude Idada. It portrays the story of Inale, a young woman from a traditional village, confronting themes of love, sacrifice, and destiny.

In 2021, Ikwue was featured on the single "Searching", released by 2Face Idibia. The track features a mix of English and Idoma lyrics and showcases a collaboration between two artists from different musical generations.

== Achievements and awards ==
- Lifetime Achievement Award – Nigerian Music Awards (2005)
- African Movie Academy Award: Best Soundtrack for the film Inale (2011).
- Musical Copyright Society of Nigeria (MCSN): Joined in 2022.
- Presidential Recognition: Congratulated by President Muhammadu Buhari on his 80th birthday for his contributions to Nigerian music and culture.
- His song "Still Searching" was featured on the compilation album Black Starliner.
- Nigerian Music Industry Merit Award (2016)
- Performed at Akwa Ibom Christmas Carols Festival (2014), which was recognised by Guinness World Record for the "Largest Assembly of Carol Singers on the Face of the Earth."
- Appointed Special Copyright Inspector (2019) by the Nigerian Copyright Commission (NCC)

.

== Selected discography ==
- "Still Searching"
- "Cock Crow At Dawn"
- "Wulu Wulu"
- "The Way It Is"
- "Inale"
- "Tell my girl"
- "What's Gonna be's Gonna be"
- "Amen"
