= Scott Lyster =

Canadian actor (born 1987)

Scott Lyster (born January 22, 1987) is a Canadian actor.

== Career ==
In 2010 he played Randy Jackson, sheriff's son, in Psych episode Dual Spires. In 2012, he starred as Richie in the indie film Locked in a Garage Band and in 2016 played Nelson in psychological horror film The Unseen.

He also portrayed Perry Dell in Hallmark Movies & Mysteries TV-films series The Aurora Teagarden Mysteries, based on Charlaine Harris crime novels.

== Filmography ==
=== Film ===
Year	Title	Role	Notes
2009	The Shortcut	Dougie	Supporting role
2010	Frankie & Alice	Pete Prescott	Supporting role
2012	Locked in a Garage Band	Richie	Main role
2014	The Spiral	Pizza Guy	Short film
2016	The Unseen	Nelson	Supporting role
2017	The Show	Zack	originally titled This Is Your Death
2018	Violentia	Simon Frost	

=== Television ===
Year	Title	Role	Notes
2007	Bionic Woman	Some Guy	Episode: "Faceoff"
2009	Polar Storm	Kevin	TV-Movie
2009	Sorority Wars	P.J.	TV-Movie
2010	Psych	Randy Jackson	Episode: "Dual Spires"
2012	Arrow	Shane Colvin	Episode: "Year's End"
2015	Olympus	Athens Young Guard	Episode: "Blood Brothers"
2015	Cedar Cove	Cal Pattenson	Episode: "Hello Again"
2017	Rogue	Thoroughgood	Episode: "A Good Leaving Alone"
2017	Woman of the House	Brad	TV-Movie

=== The Aurora Teagarden Mysteries ===
Year	Title	Role
2015	Real Murders: An Aurora Teagarden Mystery	Perry Dell
2016	Three Bedrooms, One Corpse: An Aurora Teagarden Mystery	Perry Dell
2016	The Julius House: An Aurora Teagarden Mystery	Perry Dell
2017	Dead Over Heels: An Aurora Teagarden Mystery	Perry Dell
2018	Last Scene Alive: An Aurora Teagarden Mystery	Perry Dell
