= Omotola Jalade Ekeinde =

Nigerian actress (born 1978)

Chief Omotola Jalade Ekeinde MFR
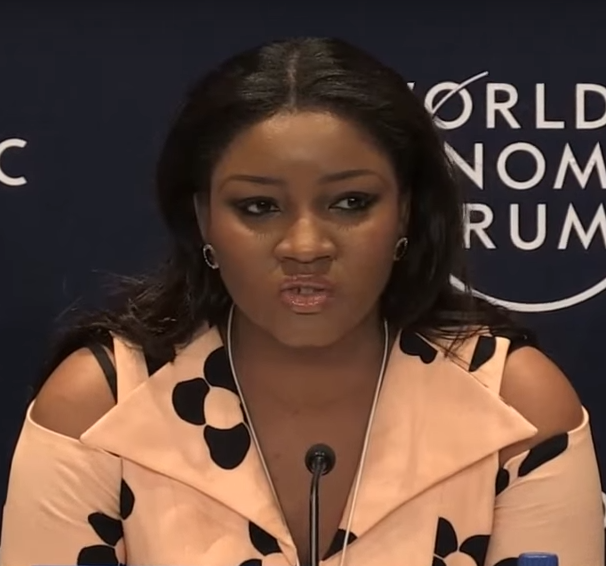
- Omotola at the 2015 World Economic Forum
- Born: Omotola Jalade; 7 February 1978 (age 48); Lagos State, Nigeria
- Other names: "Omo Sexy"; Omotola Jolade Ekeinde; Omotola Jalade; Omotola Ekeinde
- Citizenship: Nigerian
- Education: Obafemi Awolowo University; Yaba College of Technology; Chrisland Schools
- Occupations: Actress; singer; former model
- Years active: 1993–present
- Spouse: Captain Matthew Ekeinde
- Children: 4

Chief Omotola Jalade Ekeinde, MFR (/ˌoʊməˈtoʊlə/ OH-mə-TOH-lə; born 7 February 1978) is a Nigerian actress, former model, and philanthropist, who, after her Nollywood acting debut in 1995, has appeared in over 300 films. Jalade is the first Nigerian celebrity to receive over 1 million likes on Facebook. As of 2016, she has over 3 million followers. In 2013, Jalade was included in Time 100 most influential people. That year, she appeared on VH1's scripted series, Hit the Floor. She spoke at the 2013 edition of the WISE Summit, held in Doha, Qatar.

In 2014, she was conferred Member of the Order of the Federal Republic by the Nigerian government for her contributions to the Nigerian cinema.

== Early life and education ==
Omotola Jalade, who is of Ondo descent, was born in Lagos State. She grew up with her parents and two younger brothers, Tayo and Bolaji Jalade. Her mother, Oluwatoyin Jalade née Amori Oguntade, worked at J.T Chanrai Nigeria, and her father, Oluwashola Jalade, worked at the YMCA and the Lagos Country Club.

Ekeinde attended Chrisland School, Opebi (1981–1987), Oxford Children School (1987), Santos Layout, and Command Secondary School, Kaduna (1988–1993). She had a brief stint at Obafemi Awolowo University and completed her studies at Yaba College of Technology (1996–2004), where she studied Estate Management.

Ekeinde originally wanted a career in business management. However, while awaiting her results from university, she began modelling to earn a living.

== Career ==
=== Acting career ===
Ekeinde was introduced to acting while accompanying a friend to an audition in the early 1990s. Her first acting role was in the 1993 film Iva, directed by Reginald Ebere. She was given the lead role in the film. Her first major role was in the film Mortal Inheritance (1996), where she played a sickle-cell patient who fought for her life against small odds of survival. Since then, she has starred in several films, including Games Women Play, Blood Sisters, All My Life, Last Wedding, My Story, The Woman in Me, and others.

For her role in Mortal Inheritance, she won the awards for Best Actress in an English-Speaking Movie and Best Actress Overall at the 1997 Movie Awards in Nigeria. She was the youngest actress in Nigeria at that time to win this.

In the late 1990s and early 2000s, she starred in several sequel films, including Lost Kingdom II, Kosorogun II, and Blood Sister II, leading to a grand achiever award from the Global Excellence Recognition Awards in 2004. She was awarded Best Actress in a supporting role during the Africa Movie Academy Awards in 2005.

After shooting roughly 300 direct-to-video movies, Ekeinde received her first cinematic movie role in the 2010 film Ije. This film was shot at locations in Jos and the United States. Ije was the highest grossing Nollywood film at the time, a feat later broken by Phone Swap (2012). In 2012, she starred in the Nollywood thriller, Last Flight to Abuja, which became the second-highest-grossing movie in West African cinemas that year. She has gone on to win over 40 domestic and international awards.

In 2015, Ekeinde celebrated her 20th anniversary in the entertainment industry, having appeared in about hundreds of films.

In June 2018, Ekeinde and fellow Nigerian Femi Odugbemi received invitations to be voting members at the Academy Awards.

=== Music career ===
Ekeinde launched a music career in 2005 with the release of her debut album titled "gba". The album produced the singles "Naija Lowa" and "The Things You Do To Me." Her unreleased second album, Me, Myself, and Eyes, brought in production from Paul Play and Del B. It was supported by the songs "Feel Alright", featuring Harrysong, and "Through the Fire", featuring Uche.

In late 2012, Ekeinde began working on her third album and enlisted the help of The Bridge Entertainment. She went to Atlanta, Georgia, in the United States to work with producers and songwriters who could help create a sound that would resonate with American audiences. She had studio sessions with Kendrick Dean, Drumma Boy and Verse Simmonds and recorded a song with singer Bobby V.

=== Reality show ===
In 2012, Ekeinde also launched a reality television show, Omotola: The Real Me, on Africa Magic Entertainment, a M-Net subsidiary broadcast on DStv. She was the first Nigerian celebrity to star in her own reality show.

== Philanthropy ==
Ekeinde became a United Nations World Food Programme Ambassador in 2005, going to missions in Sierra Leone and Liberia. She also supports organisations such as Charles Odii's SME100 Africa to empower youth and young women in society. She has been active in the Walk the World project and participated in the Walk the World campaign in Liberia with President Ellen Johnson Sirleaf.

Her human rights campaign work is centered on her NGO project, called the Omotola Youth Empowerment Program (OYEP). This undertaking brought hundreds of youths together for the Empowerment Walk and Convention. She lent her voice in 2010 to the "Rewrite The Future" campaign of Save The Children UK.

She became an Amnesty International campaigner in 2011 and has participated in campaigns in Sierra-Leone (Maternal Mortality) and a 2012 campaign for the Niger Delta in Nigeria, where she shot a video asking Shell plc and the government to "own up, clean up, pay up| and take responsibility for the oil spills in the Niger Delta.

In June 2020, she visited an orphanage home in Tanzania run by Tanzania Mitindo House, which focuses on HIV infected children, with Tanzanian actress Wema Sepetu.

To promote the 2021 World No Tobacco Day and the #SmokeFreeNollywood campaign, Ekeinde and actors (Dakore Egbuson-Akande, Daniel Effiong, Meg Otanwa, Michelle Dede, Osas Ighodaro pledged to stop smoking in their movie scenes, as it had a negative influence on young kids who looked up to them. The campaign was backed by US non-profit organization Tobacco-Free Kids and the sub-Saharan public strategy firm Gatefield.

== Awards and recognition ==
Ekeinde had a regular column in OK! Nigeria Magazine titled "Omotola's Diary", which featured writings about her life and experiences. On 5 November 2013, she received the Ebony Vanguard Award at the Music Video and Screen Awards (MVISA) held in Birmingham, England. On 9 November 2013, Oba Victor Kiladejo, the king of the Ondo Kingdom, conferred on Omotola a chieftaincy title in her hometown of Ondo.

In 2012, CNN Travel included Ekeinde's accent on their list of the "world's twelve sexiest accents". The Nigerian accent ranked fifth on the list. In 2013, she was included in Time magazine's list of the 100 most influential people in the world.

Ekeinde was included in the list of Top 100 most influential Africans by New African magazine in 2013.

In 2015, she was listed among the highest-grossing movie actors. Others on the list included Shah Rukh Khan, Frank Welker, Bob Bergen, Jack Angel, Mickie McGowan, Michael Papajohn, Martin Klebba, Clint Howard and Chris Ellis. This listing was compiled and researched by Yahoo!.

In 2019, Jalade Ekeinde received an honorary Doctor of Arts degree from Igbinedion University, Okada, in recognition of her contributions to human development and progress at the national and international levels. She was among a group of honourees that included former President Goodluck Jonathan.

== Personal life ==
Jalade married Captain Matthew Ekeinde in 1996. Together, they have four children.

== Selected filmography ==
Actor
Title	Year	Role	Notes
Iva	1993		with Francis Duru, Olu Jacobs
Venom of Justice	1995		
Mortal Inheritance	1996	Kemi Johnson	with Fred Amata, Kunle Bamtefa, Abiola Atanda
Scores to Settle	1998		with Liz Benson, Richard Mofe-Damijo, Teco Benson
Lost Kingdom	1999		with Pete Edochie, Enebeli Elebuwa
Kosorogun	2002		with Faithia Balogun, Shan George
When Love Dies	2003	Mary	
Under Fire	2003		with Chiege Alisigwe, Charles Awurum
The Outsider	2003		
Rescue	2003		
Blood Sisters	2003	Gloria	with Genevieve Nnaji
Royal Family	2004		
Die Another Day	2004	Queen	
A Kiss from Rose	2004		with Desmond Elliot, Fred Amata
Games Women Play	2005	Yvonne	
Brave Heart	2005		with Zack Orji, Emma Ayalogu
Taste of Sin	2006	Debbie	With Funke Adewusi, Uduak Akrah
The Revelation	2007		
Sand in My Shoes	2007		with Tchidi Chikere, Mike Ezuruonye
Careless Soul	2007		With Emeka Ike, Ralph Onu
Yankee Girls	2008	Immaculate	With Suen Akindele, Musa Abudu
Temple of Justice	2008		with Nonso Diobi, Queen Nwokoye
My Last Ambition	2009	Amanda	With Nonso Diobi, Nadia Buari
Ije: The Journey	2010	Anya Opara Michino	With Genevieve Nnaji, Odalys Garcia, Ulrich Que
A Private Storm	2010	Gina	With Ramsey Nouah, Ufuoma Ejenobor, John Dumelo
Ties That Bind	2011	Adobea Onyomena	With Ama K. Abebrese, Kimberly Elise
Last Flight to Abuja	2012	Suzie	With Hakeem Kae-Kazim, Jim Iyke, Jide Kosoko
Amina	2012	Amina	With Charlie Buck, Alison Carroll, Jonathan Cohen
Hit The Floor	2013	Omotola	
Blood on the Lagoon	2014	Scarlett Belo	With Stephen Abeng, Akuma Agu, Niran Aladetan
My Only Inheritance			
Alter Ego	2017	Ada Igwe	With Wale Ojo and Kunle Remi
The Island	2017	Mrs Tokunbo Bowe Cole	TV series
The Tribunal	2017		
Up Creek a Paddle	TBA	Desiye	Post production
RattleSnake: The Ahanna Story	2020	Maimuna Atafo	With Stan Nze, Osas Ighodaro
Shadow Parties	2021	as Princess Fadekemi	With Toyin Abraham, Ayanfe Adekunle
Lockdown	2021	Dr Njoku	With Omini Aho, Chioma Chukwuka Akpotha
Mother's Love	2026	Labake	With Ifeanyi Kalu, Olumide Oworu, Noray, Nehita

== Discography ==
=== Studio albums ===
- GBA (2005)
- Me, Myself, and Eyes (2010)

=== Singles ===
Year	Title	Album
2014	"Barren Land"	Me, Myself, and Eyes
2015	"Strong Girl (Remix)" As featured artiste	—N/a

== Awards and nominations ==
Year	Award	Category	Recipient	Result	Ref
1997	The Movie Awards (THEMA)	Best Actress English	Mortal Inheritance	Won	
1997	The Movie Awards (THEMA)	Best Actress Overall	Mortal Inheritance	Won	
2004	City People awards for Excellence	Best Actress	Herself	Won	
2004	Global Excellence Recognition Awards	Best Actress & Grand Achiever	Herself	Won	
2004	Civil Enlightenment Organization of Nigeria (CEON)	Best Individual & Symbol of Creativity	Herself	Won	
2004	NUSEC Awards	Best Actress	Herself	Won	
2005	1st Africa Movie Academy Awards (AMAA)	Best Actress in a Supporting Role	Herself	Won	
2006	Youths Benefactor's Award	Most friendly Actress	Herself	Won	
2009	2009 Best of Nollywood Awards	Best Actress Leading Role (Yoruba)	Herself	Nominated	
2009	2009 Nigeria Entertainment Awards	Best Actress	Herself	Nominated	
2010	2010 Nigeria Entertainment Awards	Best Actress Film/Short Story	Deepest of Dreams	Nominated	
2010	2010 Ghana Movie Awards	Best Actress-Africa Collaboration	A Private Storm	Nominated	
2011	8th Africa Movie Academy Awards	Africa Movie Academy Award for Best Actress in a Supporting Role	Ties That Bind	Nominated	
2011	2011 Ghana Movie Awards	Best Actress-Africa Collaboration	Ties That Bind	Won	
2011	2011 Best of Nollywood Awards	Best Actress Leading Role (English)	A Private Storm	Nominated	
2011	2011 Nigeria Entertainment Awards	Best Actress Film/Short Story	Ijé	Nominated	
2012	Eloy Awards	Actress of the Year	Ties That Bind	Won	
2012	Screen Nation Awards	Pan African Best Actress	Herself	Won	
2012	Black Entertainment Film Fashion Television and Arts Awards (BEFFTA)	Film Actress Icon	Herself	Won	
2012	2012 Golden Icons Academy Movie Awards	GIAMA Humanitarian Award	Omotola Youth Empowerment Foundation	Won	
2012	2012 Golden Icons Academy Movie Awards	Viewers Choice -Female	Herself	Nominated	
2012	2012 Nigeria Entertainment Awards	Best Actress in A Film	Ties That Bind	Nominated	
2012	2012 Nollywood Movies Awards	Best Actress in a Leading Role	A Private Storm	Nominated	
2013	2013 Nollywood Movies Awards	Popular Online Choice	Herself	Won	
2013	Music Video and Screen Awards (MVISA)	Ebony Vanguard Award	Herself	Won	
2013	2013 Nigeria Entertainment Awards	Best Lead Actress in a Film	Last Flight to Abuja	Nominated	
2014	MTV Africa Music Awards 2014	Personality of the Year	Herself	Nominated	
2016	City People Social Media Awards	Female Entertainment Personality	Herself	Won	
2017	Nollywood Travel Film Festival	Best Actress	Alter Ego	Won	
2017	Toronto International Nollywood Film Festival	Best Actress	Alter Ego	Won	
2017	Best of Nollywood Awards	Lifetime Achievement Award	Herself	Won	
2017	Best of Nollywood Awards	Best Kiss in a Movie	Herself and Kunle Remmy	Nominated	
2017	Best of Nollywood Awards	Best Actress Leading Role (English)	Alter Ego		
2017	City People Movie Awards	Best Actress Leading Role (English)	Alter Ego	Nominated	
2018	Africa Magic Viewer's Choice Awards (AMVCA)	Best Actress in a Movie/TV Series	Alter Ego	Won	

== See also ==
- List of Yoruba people
- List of Nigerian actresses
