= Ikechukwu Onyeka =

Nigerian film director

- Born: December 25
- Citizenship: Nigerian
- Occupation: Filmmaker
- Years active: 1998 - present
- Notable work: A Private Storm

Ikechukwu Onyeka // is a Nigerian film director.

== Early life and education ==
Onyeka is from Umuoji, Idemili North local government area in Anambra State, located in the southeastern region of Nigeria. In 2012, he enrolled at Colorado Film School to study cinematography. He highlighted his quest to get optimal knowledge in film-making as his reason for taking a break to return to school.

== Career ==
Prior to film-making, Onyeka was an okada rider (commercial motorcyclist). Between 1998 and 2006, he directed 70 films and produced thirteen. Onyeka ventured into Nollywood as a property manager, before becoming a production manager, producer, the assistant director then director. According to him, he didn't like acting because of the publicity that comes along with it. He has also founded his production company, Iykon pictures. Onyeka is described as one of the "most accomplished directors" in Nollywood. In 2010, during an interview in New York, he stated that having worked with most big names in the industry, Genevieve Nnaji is arguably the "only star in Nollywood", he cited her professionalism as a reason for this. He explained that other actors were popular, but not stars. He also described Mercy Johnson as the most popular face in the film industry.

== Filmography ==
- Unforeseen (2005)
- Eagle's Bride (2005)
- Slave To Lust (2007)
- Warrior's Heart (2007)
- The Captain (2006)
- Corporate Maid (2008)
- Intimidation
- Reloaded (2009)
- A Private Storm (2010)
- Mr and Mrs (2012)
- The Grave Dust (2015)
- The Banker (2015)
- The Duplex (2015)
- Forgetting June (2013)
- Brother's Keeper (2014)
