= Georges Rutaganda =

Rwandan convicted war criminal (1958–2010)

- Georges Rutaganda
- Born: 28 November 1958; Commune Masango, Prefecture de Gitarama, Rwanda
- Died: 11 October 2010 (aged 51); Porto-Novo, Benin
- Children: 3 Children; At least one son
- Status: Deceased
- Allegiance: Rwanda
- Convictions: Crime against Humanity (Extermination); Genocide; Violations of Common Article 3 (Murder)
- Penalty: Life imprisonment

Details
- Date apprehended: 10 October 1995
- Imprisoned at: Akpro-Missérété prison (Benin)

Georges Anderson Nderubumwe Rutaganda (November 28, 1958 – October 11, 2010) was a Rwandan convicted war criminal and the second vice-president of the Rwandan Hutu militia Interahamwe. Rutaganda played a crucial role in the Rwandan genocide of 1994. Prosecutor James Stewart stated that "Without Georges Rutaganda, the Rwandan genocide would not have functioned the way it did." He was on radio RTLM (Radio Télévision Libre des Mille Collines) in Kigali in 1994, encouraging Interahamwe Militia to exterminate all Tutsis. It was alleged that Rutaganda captured, raped, and tortured Tutsi women in Interahamwe hideouts in Kigali. Other accounts state that Rutaganda captured Tutsi prostitutes, believing them to be witches.

During this time, Rutaganda was reported to supply his militia with stolen supplies from the Rwandan military. Rutaganda was arrested on October 10, 1995, and transferred to Arusha, Tanzania, on May 26, 1996. He was sentenced to life imprisonment for genocide, crimes against humanity and murder.

He died from illness in Benin, where he was serving his sentence, on October 11, 2010.

== In popular culture ==
Rutaganda was portrayed by British-Nigerian actor Hakeem Kae-Kazim in the historical drama film Hotel Rwanda.
