= 2011 Nigeria Entertainment Awards =

The 2011 Nigeria Entertainment Awards was the 6th edition of the ceremony to reward outstanding contribution to Nigerian entertainment industry. It was held at Sharp Theater, Symphony Space, New York City on 5 September 2011. It was hosted by Funke Akindele and Julius Agwu.

== Awards ==
=== Music ===
Album of the Year

- Aṣa – Beautiful Imperfection
- Sound Sultan – Back From The Future
- Darey – Double Dare
- Duncan Mighty – Legacy
- MI – MI2
- Naeto C – Super C Season

Hottest Single Of The Year

- D’Prince – "Give It To Me" ft. Dbanj
- Duncan Mighty – "Obianuju"
- Ice Prince – "Oleku" ft. Brymo
- J-Martins – "Jupa"
- Wizkid – "Tease Me"
- Dbanj – "Mr. Endowed Remix" ft. Snoop Dogg & Don Jazzy

Best New Act Of The Year

- Dr. Sid
- Ice Prince
- Mo’Cheddah
- Tiwa Savage
- Waje
- Wizkid

Gospel Artist Of The Year

- Bouqoi
- Frank Edwards
- Kenny St. Brown
- Lara George
- Sinach

Best Pop/R&B Artist Of The Year

- Banky W
- Darey Art Alade
- Dbanj
- Tuface
- Waje
- Wizkid

Best Rap Act Of The Year

- Eva Alordiah
- Ice Prince
- MI
- Naeto C
- Ruggedman
- Terry Tha Rapman

Music Producer Of The Year

- Cobhams Asuquo
- Don Jazzy
- Samklef
- Sossick
- Dokta Frabz

Best International Artist

- Asa
- JJC
- Mo Eazy
- Ndu
- Nneka
- May7ven

Best Music Video Of The Year

- Darey Art Alade– "Ba Ni Kidi" (Mark Hofmeyr)
- Olamide – "Eni Duro" (DJ Tee)
- Omawumi – "If You Ask Me" (Clarence Peters)
- Konga – "Kaba Kaba" (Akin Alabi)
- Bez – "More You" (Kemi Adetiba)
- Dbanj – "Mr. Endowed Remix" (Sesan)

Most Promising Act To Watch

- Olamide
- Retta
- Vector
- Zara
- Brymo
- Jhybo
- Munachi Abii
- Ketch-Up

Pan-African Artist or Group Of The Year

- Awilo Longomba
- VIP
- Winky D
- Fally Ipupa
- Juliana Kanyomozi
- R2Bees

Best US Based Male Artist Of The Year

- Cap B
- Dami Oloye
- Duncan Daniels
- Kunzo
- Rotimi
- T-Money

Best US Based Female Artist Of The Year

- Moyeen
- Naira
- Nnenna Yvonne
- Titi Lokei
- Tolumide
- Zaina

Indigenous Artist Of The Year

- Duncan Mighty
- Flavour
- Solek
- 9ice
- Jah Bless
- Jodie

=== Film/TV ===
Best Actor In A Film/Short Story

- Chet Anekwe – Tobi
- Femi Adebayo – Jelili
- Odunlade Adekola – Emi ni Ire Kan
- Ramsey Nouah – A Private Storm
- Hakeem Kae Kassim – Inale
- Pascal Atuma – Okoto the Messenger

Best Actress In A Film/Short Story

- Mercy Johnson – Heart of a Widow
- Omoni Oboli – Anchor Baby (film)
- Omotola Jalade – Ije
- Uche Jombo – Nollywood Hustlers
- Caroline Chikezie – Inale
- Genevieve Nnaji – Tango with Me

Best Picture (Producer)

- Adesuwa – Lancelot Oduwa Imaseun
- Anchor Baby – Lonzo Nzekwe
- Ije – Chineze Anyaene
- Inale – Jeta Amata
- Tango with Me – Mahmood Ali-Balogun
- The Mirror Boy – Obi Emelonye

Best Actor In TV Series/Reality/Game Show

- Kin Lewis – Spider
- Frank Edoho – Who wants to be a Millionaire
- Uche Sam Anyamele – About to Wed
- Victor Olaotan – Tinsel
- Emeka Ossai – Clinic Matters
- Gideon Okeke – Tinsel

Best Actress In TV Series/Reality/Game Show

- Amanda Ebeye – City Sistas
- Damilola Adegbite – Tinsel
- Funmi Eko – City Sistas
- Missi Molu – Nigerian Idol
- Ufuoma Ejenobor – Royal Roots
- Matilda Obaseki – Tinsel

Pan-African Actress Of The Year (Film/Short Story)

- Akofa Aiedu
- Ama K. Abebrese
- Nadia Buari
- Yvonne Okoro
- Jackie Appiah
- Yvonne Cherrie

Pan-African Actor Of The Year (Film/Short Story)

- Chris Attoh
- Edward Kagutuzi
- John Dumelo
- Chris Attoh
- Majid Michel
- Van Vicker

Best Directing In A Film/Short Story

- Lonzo Nzekwe – Anchor Baby
- Jeta Amata – Inale
- Mahmood Ali-Balogun – Tango with Me
- Lancelot Imasuen & Ikechukwu Onyeka – A Private Storm
- Ije
- Pascal Atuma – Okoto the Messenger

=== Others ===
Comedian Of The Year

- CD John (late)
- Gandoki
- Gordon
- Helen Paul
- Yvonne Orji
- Daniel-d-humorous

Best World DJ Nominees

- DJ Afoo (New York)
- DJ Caise (Nigeria)
- DJ E Cool (Atlanta)
- DJ Jam Jam (UK)
- DJ Obi (Boston)
- DJ Smooth (DC/MD)
- DJ Tommy (Nigeria)
- DJ Flava (Malaysia)

Entertainment Executive Of The Year

- Audu Makori (Chocolate City)
- Banky W. (Empire Mates Entertainment)
- Don Jazzy (Mo’hits)
- Eldee (Trybe Records)
- Obi Asika (Storm Records)
- Tony Nwakalor (Yes Media)

Promoter Of The Year

- Ciba Entertainment (Houston)
- Cokobar (UK)
- Starmix (UK)
- Stronghold (Malaysia)
- Industry Nite (Lagos)
