= Mary Uranta =

Nigerian entertainer

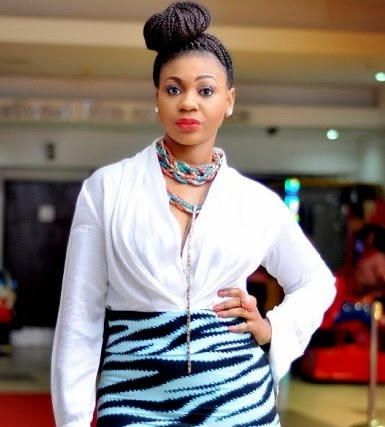
- Uranta in 2013
- Born: Port Harcourt
- Education: Rivers State University of Science and Technology
- Occupations: Actress, model, film producer, singer
- Years active: 2006—present

Mary Data Uranta is a Nigerian actress, producer, model, singer, and businesswoman.

== Early life ==
Uranta was born and raised in Port Harcourt, the capital city of Rivers State, south-south Nigeria. She competed in beauty pageant Miss Niger Delta, where she achieved the rank of first runner-up. The first acting role she got was in the year 2000 in the film, Girls Hostel. In 2006, she received more significant attention with a leading role in the Nollywood movie, Secret Mission. She also featured in other films including Love Doctor, Critical Passion, Pradah, Secret Shadow, and Blood Game.

Aside from being an actress, Uranta is an entrepreneur through her own movie production company. She established the Mary Uranta Foundation, a charity organisation which helps improve the lives of underprivileged children in Opobo, Rivers State. Her contributions to the film industry has earned her a City People Award, Best of Nollywood Award nomination and the African Youth Ambassador Award.

== Early life and education ==
Uranta grew up primarily in Port Harcourt, the capital city of Rivers State. She has seven siblings and four step-brothers. Describing her upbringing, Uranta commented that she "had a great childhood. I never had it rough or tough growing up. Fine, I'm from an average home. But it's never been bad. I had all I wanted as a child[...]we were one happy family."

Although Uranta was born a Pentecostal Christian, she attended Roman Catholic schools, including Sacred Heart Nursery and Primary School before attending the Holy Rosary Girls Secondary School in Port Harcourt. There, she took an interest in both dancing and stage-acting and would gain a Dance and Drama scholarship upon graduation.

Uranta later enrolled at Rivers State University of Science and Technology (now Rivers State University). She had aspired to go for a course related to her dream career (acting) but ended up studying Secretarial Administration. She had also placed first runner-up in the Miss Niger Delta contest.

== Career ==
Uranta's journey of acting started with a minor guest role in the Ndubisi Okoh-directed film, Girls Hostel, alongside Uche Jombo. she won the role after her first film audition. Subsequently, Uranta played roles in films such as Paul and Silas, War of Roses, Silver Spoon, and Church Committee before taking a break to complete her education. In 2006, Uranta received her first big break role appearing as Ngozi Ezeonu's younger sister in the movie Secret Mission. Her other Nollywood films include Tea or Coffee, Tears of a Princess, Baits of Doom, The Professionals, Real Passion, Mistress, The Darkest Link, Love Doctor, Critical Passion, Pradah, Secret Shadow, and Blood Game.

Mary Uranta holds a postgraduate diploma in Theatre—a branch of performing arts—from the London School of Arts Academy. In October 2011, Uranta received the African Youth Ambassador Award for her contributions to Nollywood. The following year, she landed a Best of Nollywood Award nomination for her role in the film Mistress, and at the 4th City People Awards on 14 July 2013, she won the City People Award for Best Actress. That same year, Uranta launched 50th Academy, a film production company created to aid the industry's growth, and the Mary Uranta Foundation which caters for the welfare of deprived children in Opobo.

== Filmography ==
| Year | Film | Role | Notes |
|---|---|---|---|
| 2000 | Girls Hostel | | with Uche Jombo & Olu Jacobs |
| 2006 | Secret Mission | | with Chioma Chukwuka & Desmond Elliot |
| 2007 | The Love Doctor | Ebere | with Jackie Appiah |
| 2007 | The Love Doctor 2 | Ebere | with Jackie Appiah |
| 2011 | Gallant Babes | Gift | with Mercy Johnson |
| 2011 | Gallant Babes 2 | Gift | |
| 2013 | Nation Under Siege | | |
| 2016 | Hotel choco | | with Dianne Chukwu, Femi Branch, Tamara Eteimo |
| 2017 | Sand Castle | | with Wale Ojo, Charles Okocha, Bassey Okon |
| 2020 | Honeymoon Blues | Folake | Directed by Austin Nnaemeka Soundmind |
| 2021 | Restless | Miss Nelly | Directed by Okey Ifeanyi |

== See also ==
- List of Nigerian actors
- List of Nigerian film producers
- List of Nigerian film directors
