= Black Gold (2011 Nigerian film) =

- Directed by: Jeta Amata
- Written by: Jeta Amata
- Produced by: Wilson Ebyie; Suzanne DeLaurentiis
- Starring: Billy Zane; Tom Sizemore; Hakeem Kae-Kazim; Vivica A. Fox; Eric Roberts; Sarah Wayne Callies; Michael Madsen; Mbong Amata
- Cinematography: James M. Costello
- Edited by: Lindsay Kent
- Music by: Joel Goffin
- Production company: Rock City Entertainment
- Release date: March 26, 2011 (Palm Beach)
- Running time: 110 minutes
- Country: Nigeria
- Language: English

Black Gold is a 2011 drama film co-produced and directed by Jeta Amata. One local Niger Delta community's struggle against their own government and a multi-national oil corporation who has plundered their land and destroyed the environment. The film was reissued in 2012 with the title Black November, with 60% of the scenes reshot and additional scenes included to make the film "more current".

== Premise ==
They hope to tell the story from the perspective of people who have lived through it. Including the people who have seen their land and rivers polluted by oil, and the people that are struggling.

== Cast ==
- Billy Zane
- Tom Sizemore as Detective Brandano
- Hakeem Kae-Kazim as Dede
- Vivica A. Fox as Jackie
- Eric Roberts
- Sarah Wayne Callies as Kate Summers
- Michael Madsen
- Mbong Amata as Ebiere
- Shanna Beauchamp as Protester
- Enyinna Nwigwe as Tamuno
- Onas Okemdage as Philip
- Nse Ikpe-Etim as Lawyer

== See also ==
- Big Oil
- Petroleum industry in Nigeria
