= The Duplex (film) =

2015 Nigerian supernatural thriller film

- Theatrical release poster
- Directed by: Ikechukwu Onyeka
- Written by: Stanley Isokoh
- Produced by: Stella Isikaku; Emmanuel Isikaku
- Starring: Omoni Oboli; Mike Ezuruonye; Uru Eke; Anthony Monjaro
- Production company: Videofield International Limited
- Distributed by: FilmOne Distribution
- Release date: 6 March 2015
- Country: Nigeria
- Language: English

The Duplex is a 2015 Nigerian supernatural thriller film produced by Emma Isikaku and directed by Ikechukwu Onyeka. It stars Omoni Oboli, Mike Ezuruonye, Uru Eke and Anthony Monjaro.

The film revolves around the life of Emeka (Mike Ezuruonye), who is "on the edge of life" as he battles, not only to save his wife, Adaku (Omoni Oboli) and their unborn baby, but also his investment of ₦12 million, inadvertently, in a cemetery, glorified as a duplex.

== Cast ==
- Omoni Oboli as Adaku
- Mike Ezuruonye as Emeka
- Uru Eke as Dora
- Anthony Monjaro as Jones
- Ayo Umoh as Akpan
- Maureen Okpoko as Seer
- Patrick Chukwueko as Wale
- Aret Edet as Matilda
- T.J. Morgan as Ghost
- Okechukwu Oku as Chukwudi
- Ikechukwu Onyeka as Doctor

== Release ==
The official trailer of The Duplex was released online in July 2014. The film was released in selected cinemas on 6 March 2015.

== Critical reception ==
Amarachukwu Iwuala of 360Nobs panned everything about the film, stating: "There is really nothing the best cast in the world can do to a film, whose story and screening lack depth as we see in The Duplex. Rather, the half-baked work will drag them down to its level. Some film-makers should make a conscious effort to entertain rather than punish their viewers with trivial-round movies".
