= Sarah Wayne Callies =

American actress (born 1977)

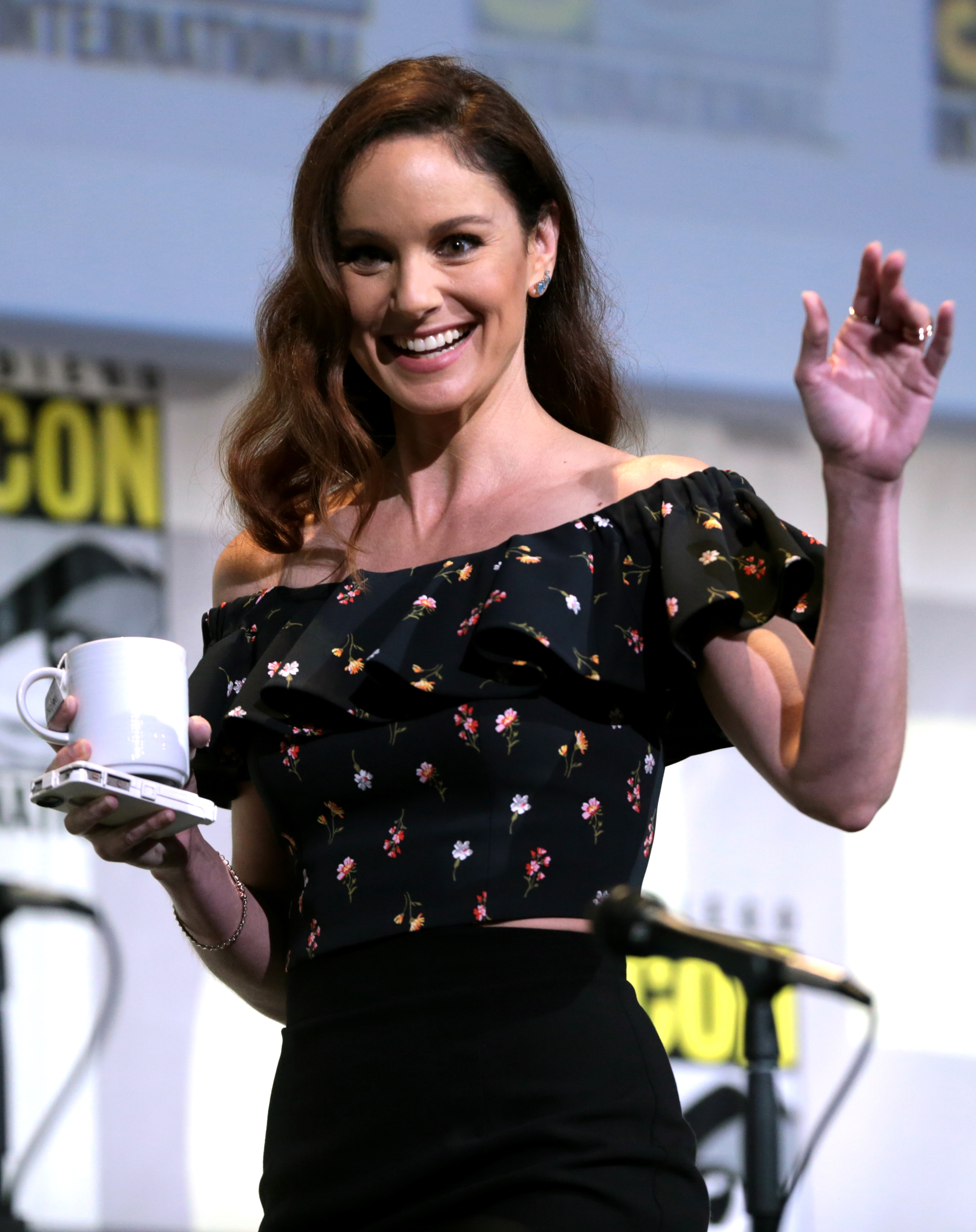
- Callies in 2016
- Born: 1977 (age 49)
- Education: Dartmouth College (BA); National Theatre Conservatory (MFA)
- Occupation: Actress
- Years active: 2003–present
- Spouse: Josh Winterhalt (m. 2002)
- Children: 2

Sarah Wayne Callies (born 1977) is an American actress. She may be best known for her starring television roles as Sara Tancredi in Prison Break, Lori Grimes in The Walking Dead, or Katie Bowman in Colony. Her film roles include Whisper (2007), Black Gold (2011), and The Show (2017).

== Early life and education ==
Her parents Valerie Wayne and David Callies were both professors at the University of Hawaiʻi at Mānoa.

Callies moved to Honolulu, Hawaii, with her family when she was one year old. Throughout her youth, she expressed an interest in acting through participating in various school plays at the independent Punahou School. After graduating from high school, Callies entered Dartmouth College where she obtained a Bachelor of Arts degree in drama in 1999, with a minor in women's studies and a senior fellowship in Indigenous theology. In conjunction with her studies, Callies remained involved in theatre. She continued her education at the National Theatre Conservatory, where she obtained a Master of Fine Arts degree in 2002.

== Career ==
Callies moved to New York in 2003 and then quickly landed her first television role as Kate O'Malley, a recurring part on the short-lived CBS show Queens Supreme.

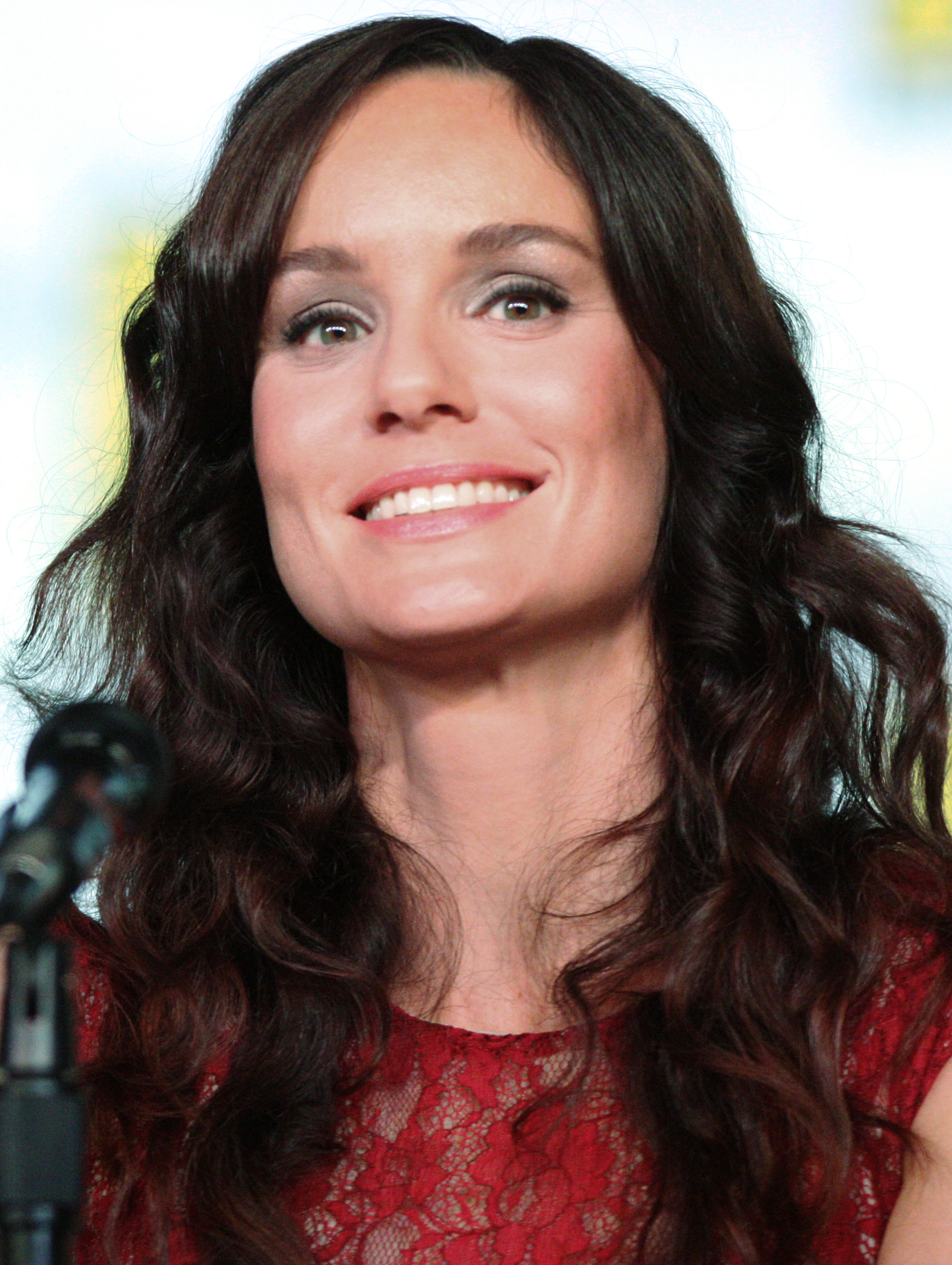
Callies at Comic-Con in 2012

=== Prison Break ===
After making various guest appearances on Law & Order: Special Victims Unit, Dragnet (2003), and NUMB3RS, Callies gained a starring role on Fox's Prison Break as Sara Tancredi. She played the role in the first two seasons, but her character was killed off for the third season before being brought back for the fourth season. According to Prison Break's executive producer Matt Olmstead, although the writers, the network, Callies herself, and he all wanted her to stay on the show, the character was written out due to contract disputes. She stated through a spokesperson to TV Guide in fall 2007:

As hard as we all tried, the Prison Break powers that be and I were unable to find a way to meet both the needs of the story and the needs of my family. We parted wishing each other well. I had a wonderful time working with the creative team and have a world of respect for all of them; they took great care of Sara. I'm also enormously grateful to the fans. They've been so gracious and supportive, and I hope they continue to enjoy the show.

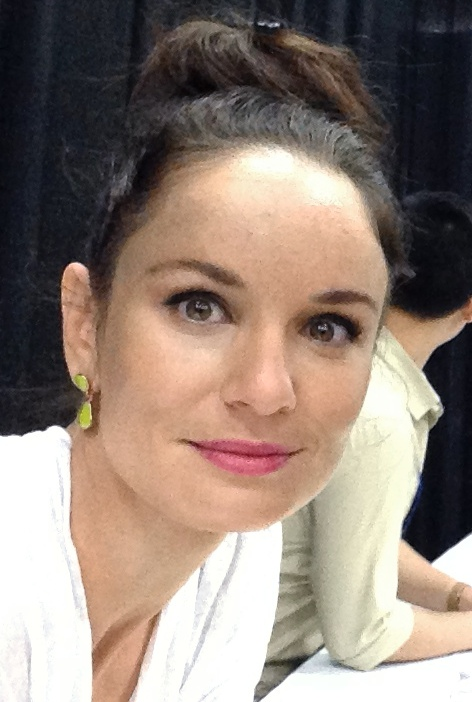
Callies at the Edmonton Expo 2013

However, in March 2008, Olmstead stated that the character of Sara is still alive and would return in season four. Though the character Sara Tancredi appeared to have a violent death, Olmstead stated "...we realized that there was actually a way she could still be alive." Executive Producer Matt Olmstead admitted the fans' overwhelming response to her death had influenced the decision to bring the character, and Callies, back to the show.

=== The Walking Dead ===
In 2010, Callies was cast in the major role of Lori Grimes on the AMC post-apocalyptic drama series The Walking Dead, based on the comic-book series of the same name. The drama became the highest-rated show in AMC's history. Callies played the role from the show's pilot until the third season.

=== Other projects ===
Callies starred in her first feature, the independent film The Celestine Prophecy, in 2006. She also starred in the horror film Whisper alongside Josh Holloway the following year. In April 2010, she appeared on the Fox Television drama House as a patient of the week, whose open marriage fascinates House and the team. In August 2010, Callies' first screenplay, an adaptation of Campbell Geeslin's children's book Elena's Serenade, was optioned by French production company Fulldawa Films.

Callies starred in the Nigerian movie Black Gold (2011) and one of the female lead roles in the Canadian thriller Faces in the Crowd (2011). In 2015, she co-starred with Nicolas Cage in Uli Edel's thriller film Pay the Ghost. In 2016, she returned to television in the lead role of Katie Bowman in Colony.

== Personal life ==
Callies is married to Josh Winterhalt, whom she met at Dartmouth College. On January 23, 2007, her publicist announced that the couple were expecting their first child. Their daughter was born in July 2007. Their second child, an adopted son, was born in 2013.

== Filmography ==
=== Film ===
Year	Title	Role	Notes
2006	The Celestine Prophecy	Marjorie	
2007	Whisper	Roxanne	
2008	Bittersweet	Robyn	
2010	Lullaby for Pi	Josephine	
2011	Black Gold	Kate Summers	
2011	Faces in the Crowd	Francine	
2011	Foreverland	Fran	
2012	Black November	Kate Summers	Updated and re-shot version of Black Gold
2014	Into the Storm	Allison Stone	
2015	Pay the Ghost	Kristen Lawford	Direct–to–video film
2016	The Other Side of the Door	Maria Harwood	
2017	The Show	Karina	Direct–to–video film
2026	Atlas King	Penelope Masterson	Direct–to–video film
TBA	Outside of Cleveland	TBA	Post-production

=== Television ===
Year	Title	Role	Notes
2003	Queens Supreme	Kate O'Malley	Recurring role; 5 episodes
2003	Dragnet	Kathryn "Kate" Randall	Episode: "The Brass Ring"
2003	Law & Order: Special Victims Unit	Jenny Rochester	Episode: "Privilege"
2003	Tarzan	Jane Porter	Main role; 9 episodes
2004	The Secret Service	Laura Kelly	Unsold television pilot
2005	Numbers	Kim Hall	Episode: "Counterfeit Reality"
2005–2009, 2017	Prison Break	Sara Tancredi	Main role (seasons 1–2, 4–5); 73 episodes
2009	Prison Break: The Final Break	Sara Tancredi	Television film
2010	House	Julia	Episode: "Open and Shut"
2010	Tangled	Chloe / Sally	Unsold television pilot
2010–2013, 2018	The Walking Dead	Lori Grimes	Main role (seasons 1–3); 28 episodes, Uncredited voice role (Episode: "What Comes After")
2016–2018	Colony	Katie Bowman	Main role; 36 episodes
2017	The Long Road Home	Leann Volesky	Main role; 6 episodes
2017	Robot Chicken	Lori Grimes	Voice role; Episode: "The Robot Chicken Walking Dead Special: Look Who's Walking"
2018–2022	Letterkenny	Anita Dyck	Recurring role; 5 episodes (seasons 6, 8, 10–11)
2019	Unspeakable	Margaret Sanders	Main role; 8 episodes
2020	Council of Dads	Robin Perry	Main role; 10 episodes
2023	The Company You Keep	Birdie Nicoletti	Main role; 10 episodes
2026	Sole Survivor of Flight 119	Lisa Foster	Television film

=== Video games ===
Year	Title	Role	Notes
2023	The Walking Dead: Destinies	Lori Grimes	Voice role

=== Stage ===
Year	Title	Role	Venue	Notes
2013	The Guardsman	The Actress	Eisenhower Theater	May 25, 2013 – June 23, 2013

=== Directing credits ===
Television
Year	Title	Notes
2018	Colony	3x09 - "The Big Empty"
2019	Unspeakable	Episode 5 - "Compensation (1988–1993)"
2020–2021	The Good Doctor	4x04 - "Not the Same"
2020–2021	The Good Doctor	4x13 - "Spilled Milk"
2020–2021	The Good Doctor	5x06 - "One Heart"
2022	Family Law	2x08 - "Family History"
2023	Firefly Lane	2x12 - "Time After Time"
2023	Firefly Lane	2x13 - "Can't Fight This Feeling"
2023–2025	Fire Country	1x09 - "No Good Deed"
2023–2025	Fire Country	2x09 - "No Future, No Consequences"
2023–2025	Fire Country	3x07 - "False Alarm"
2023–2025	Fire Country	4x03 - "The Tiny Ways We Start to Steal"
2024	The Irrational	2x07 - "Stan by Me"
2025–2026	Sheriff Country	1x08 - "Death & Taxes"
2025–2026	Sheriff Country	1x11 - "The Aftermath"
2025–2026	Sheriff Country	2x02 - "Family Trust"
2025–2026	Sheriff Country	2x03 - "Ulysses"

== Awards and nominations ==
Year	Award	Category	Nominated work	Result
2011	Saturn Awards	Best Actress on Television	The Walking Dead	Nominated
2012	Scream Awards	Best Horror Actress	The Walking Dead	Nominated
2012	Satellite Awards	Best Cast – Television Series	The Walking Dead	Won
2017	Leo Awards	Best Supporting Performance by a Female in a Motion Picture	The Show	Nominated
