= Forgetting June =

2013 film by Ikechukwu Onyeka

- Film poster
- Directed by: Ikechukwu Onyeka
- Written by: Uduak Oguamanam Isong
- Screenplay by: Uduak Oguamanam Isong
- Produced by: Emem Isong, Uduak Oguamanam Isong
- Starring: Majid Michel Beverly Naya; Mbong Amata; Biola Williams; Blossom Chuks Chukwujekwu
- Edited by: Dapo Ola Daniels
- Production company: Emem Isong Production
- Distributed by: Royal Arts Academy
- Release date: 2 September 2013
- Running time: 120 minutes
- Country: Nigeria
- Language: English

Forgetting June is a 2013 Nigerian romantic drama film directed by Ikechukwu Onyeka, starring Majid Michel, Beverly Naya, and Mbong Amata.

== Plot ==
Eddie and June share what seems to be the perfect marriage. Eddie began to lose control of his life when June had a fatal accident on a trip out of town. Eddie's younger brother Tony appealed to June's best friend, Tobi, to help Eddie recover from the emotional breakdown from the death of his wife. Tobi eventually persuaded Eddie to join her dance group, which led to an emotional connection between them. Several months later, Eddie and Tobi decide to marry despite Tobi's reservation about the union. About two years after June's accident, Tobi is pregnant with Eddie's baby when June shockingly returns to their matrimonial home, explaining the circumstances of the accident and how Dr. George saved her.

After several power struggles between June and Tobi, Eddie finally decides to keep both of them as wives. After consultations with Eddie's colleagues, June decides to return to George, whose romantic advances she had previously rejected.

== Cast ==
- Majid Michel as Eddie
- Beverly Naya as Tobi
- Mbong Amata as June
- Blossom Chuks Chukwujekwu as George
- Ben Touitou as Tony
- Abiola Segun-Williams as Mrs. Gracia
- Ifeanyichukwu Odior as Baby
- Blessing Ovat as June's secretary
- Ikechukwu Onyeka as policeman 1
- Christopher Ezirim as policeman 2
- Emeka Duru as Doctor
- Jonathan Donald as Kid
- Frederick Audu as Derek
- Paula Usifo as Eddie's secretary

== Reception ==
Nollywood Reinvented gave the film a 23% rating and was critical of its unoriginal dialogue and recycled storyline. The review concluded by saying, "I won’t deny that I was semi-excited about this movie when I originally heard of it. Why? Because even though I know better, a part of me still equates seeing Majid Michel’s face on a cast line-up with a guarantee for excellence and entertainment. I was wrong..."

== See also ==
- List of Nigerian films of 2013
