= Nation Under Siege =

- Directed by: Pascal Amanfo
- Screenplay by: Pascal Amanfo
- Starring: Majid Michel; Seun Akindele; Pascal Amanfo; Zynell Lydia Zuh; Mary Uranta
- Production company: Double D International
- Release date: 2013
- Country: Nigeria
- Language: English

Nation Under Siege, also known as Boko Haram, is a 2013 Nollywood film that was directed by Pascal Amanfo and executive produced by Double D.

== Synopsis ==
The film's premise follows counter-terrorist expert who is trying to stop a group of Islamic terrorists that are terrorizing and slaughtering Nigerians.

== Cast ==
- Nneka J. Adams
- Majid Michel
- Mary Uranta
- Pascal Amanfo
- Zynell Lydia
- Seun Akindele
- Sam Sunny

== Reception ==
The film received some controversy over Majid Michel, a Ghanaian actor, portraying a Nigerian terrorist, and for its depiction of Islamic terrorism, which resulted in the movie getting banned in Ghana. Film theaters in Nigeria also declined to screen the film for the same reasons and Amanfo had to change the film's name from Boko Haram to Nation Under Siege before releasing it in Nigeria.
