= My One and Only (film) =

- Promotional film poster
- Directed by: Richard Loncraine
- Written by: Charlie Peters
- Produced by: Aaron Ryder; Norton Herrick
- Starring: Renée Zellweger; Logan Lerman; Mark Rendall; Eric McCormack; Chris Noth; Nick Stahl; Steven Weber; Kevin Bacon
- Cinematography: Marco Pontecorvo
- Edited by: Humphrey Dixon
- Music by: Mark Isham
- Distributed by: Herrick Entertainment; Freestyle Releasing
- Release date: August 21, 2009
- Running time: 108 minutes
- Country: United States
- Language: English
- Box office: $3 million

My One and Only is a 2009 comedy-drama film loosely based on a story about George Hamilton's early life on the road with his mother and brother, featuring anecdotes that Hamilton had told to producer Robert Kosberg and Merv Griffin. Kosberg pitched the idea of this true story to screenwriter Charlie Peters, then Merv Griffin shepherded the project from screenplay to production, until his death in 2007. Merv Griffin's company served as one of the film's producers and Robert Kosberg executive produced.

My One and Only starred Logan Lerman as George and Renée Zellweger as George's mother. The film was directed by Richard Loncraine and written by Charlie Peters.

A Hallmark TV movie of the same name My One & Only was produced in 2019, starring Pascale Hutton, Samuel Page and Stephen Huszar, was different in storyline.

== Plot ==
In New York City in 1953, Anne Deveraux lives with her bandleader husband Danny, their 15-year-old son George, and Anne's somewhat older effeminate son Robbie. After catching Danny in yet another affair, Anne leaves him and takes the children with her.

Anne embarks on a road trip across the United States, in search of a husband to fund a new life for herself and her boys. George serves as the chauffeur. They first travel to Boston and Pittsburgh. Anne has a string of disastrous attempts at relationships. After finding that a former suitor now deems her too old to be of interest she becomes desperate and dispirited and chats up a man in a bar who turns out to be an undercover house detective. He charges her with solicitation.

Meanwhile, George meets with his father who comes into town on a tour. George asks him to take him back to New York but Danny turns him down because he is often on the road for his work. George concludes that Danny does not love him. George also learns that Danny had sent money several times, but Anne resolutely returned it each time.

Running low on funds, Anne tries her luck in St. Louis where her sister lives. The sisters have a very strained relationship but Anne tries to make the best of it and takes a job at a paint store and becomes engaged to the owner. It turns out, however, he is mentally ill and already married. Anne is paid off by the man's family for her trouble. As Anne readies to get on the road again, this time for Los Angeles, George informs her that he is staying with Anne's sister, whom he'd already cleared it with. Anne and George argue bitterly and Anne, resigned, accepts his decision and leaves with Robbie, who now serves as the chauffeur.

Near Albuquerque, mother and son get robbed by a couple they picked up for gas money. Robbie phones George to tell him what happened. In discussing it with Anne's sister and her husband, George discovers Anne had left money with them for his board and care. He takes the remaining money and meets Anne and Robbie at a Greyhound bus station somewhere in the Southwest.

The three arrive in Los Angeles and settle into a shabby apartment. Anne comes home one day to find Danny waiting for her. He asks if she still loves him and says he wants her and the boys to come back to New York. She replies, "I don't know if I love you but I do know I don't need you." Danny then departs extending an open invitation to return if she changes her mind.

Anne forges ahead and the family gets work as extras in a movie. Anne catches the eye of the movie producer and manages to get Robbie slated to try for a starring role. George thinks maybe his mother was right all along and everything will turn out fine. But that evening Anne gets a call and learns Danny has died of a heart attack. George flies back to New York to attend Danny's funeral and gets Anne's blessing to stay there and attend his former prep school on scholarship.

Soon, however, he realizes he belongs with his family and returns to Los Angeles unannounced. George finds Robbie having difficulty with a scene in a movie. As he helps Robbie recite his lines, George is discovered as a talented actor. Robbie gives up acting and goes to work in costuming. In an epilogue, George reveals that he is a contracted Hollywood actor and has changed his last name to "Hamilton", which was his father's real last name. He realizes that Anne, Robbie and he didn't need anyone to take care of them, that they could take care of themselves and that they were going to be just fine.

== Cast ==
- Renée Zellweger as Anne Devereaux (based on Anne Hamilton Spalding)
- Logan Lerman as George Devereaux
- Kevin Bacon as Danny Devereaux
- Troy Garity as Officer Klute
- David Koechner as Bill Massey
- Eric McCormack as Charlie
- Chris Noth as Harlan
- Mark Rendall as Robbie, George's older half-brother
- Nick Stahl as Bud, Paula's older brother
- Steven Weber as Wallace
- Robin Weigert as Hope, Anne's sister
- Molly Quinn as Paula, a friend George makes in Pittsburgh
- Phoebe Strole as Wendy
- J.C. Mack as Tom

== Production ==
Filming took place in the Baltimore area beginning on June 9, 2008. Part of this filming took place in the Institute of Notre Dame private high school. Other locations included Mount Vernon, Baltimore, and the 26-acre (110,000 m^{2}) estate Tyrconnell near Lake Roland. For several weeks in early August 2008, further filming took place in Albuquerque, New Mexico.

Many of the scenes include the use of an azure blue 1953 Cadillac Eldorado. The 1953 Eldorado "hero car" (#87 out of just 532 Cadillac Eldorados made that year) was used at the film's premiere in New York City on August 18, 2009 at the Paris Theater, Manhattan.

== Music ==
The jazzy score to My One and Only was composed by Mark Isham, who recorded it with a 20-piece jazz orchestra ensemble of the Hollywood Studio Symphony at the LA Sound Gallery in Burbank, California.

== Release ==
The film was released on August 21, 2009, in New York City, New York, and Los Angeles, California. On September 4, 2009 the release was expanded to 20 markets across the US. The film was also released in the Netherlands on September 10, 2009.

== Reception ==
On Rotten Tomatoes, the film holds a rating of 69% based on 71 reviews, with an average rating of 6.2/10. The critics consensus reads, "A breezy road movie with characters both glamorous and familiar, My One and Only is a colorful period look at the early life of actor George Hamilton." On Metacritic, the film was assigned a weighted average score of 62 out of 100 based on 22 critics, indicating "generally favorable reviews".
