= Phoebe Strole =

American actress and singer (born 1983)

- Born: January 22, 1983 (age 43); Fort Worth, Texas, U.S.
- Occupation: Actress
- Years active: 2001–present

Phoebe Strole (born January 22, 1983) is an American actress who is best known for originating the role of Anna in the 2006 Broadway musical Spring Awakening.

Strole has appeared in several stage productions, including Mourning Becomes Electra, Parade, The Metal Children, and Kung Fu. She has worked in film and television, starring in Sorority Wars and Hamlet 2, and appearing in shows like Rescue Me, Law & Order: Criminal Intent, 30 Rock, and Glee. She was nominated for a Grammy Award in 2008 for Best Musical Show Album for her work in Spring Awakening.

== Early life ==
Strole was born in Fort Worth, Texas. She graduated from Southwest High School in Fort Worth. While in high school, Strole performed in several productions at Casa Mañana Theatre in Fort Worth, Texas, including Evita, Violet and Bye Bye Birdie. In 2001, Strole starred as Jean in A Different Moon at the Penguin Repertory Theatre in Stony Point, New York. Additional Penguin Rep credits include Animal of the Year.

Tisch credits include a reading of When Grace Comes In opposite Marcia Gay Harden.

== Career ==
=== Stage ===
Strole is perhaps best known for her role in the Broadway musical Spring Awakening in which she played the role of Anna and understudied the roles of Wendla and Ilse. She played the role from the musical's Broadway debut on December 10, 2006 through July 19, 2008. She also played the same role in the original Off Broadway production earlier during the summer of 2006. Phoebe shared her final performance in Spring Awakening on July 19, 2008 with fellow costars Skylar Astin, Remy Zaken, Brian Charles Johnson and Lilli Cooper. She was the eldest OBC playing a principal role, having been 23 when cast.

Strole was a cast member in The New Group production of Eugene O'Neill's play Mourning Becomes Electra at the Alcorn Theatre in New York, which ran from January 27 to April 18, 2009.

Strole performed in Parade at the Center Theatre Group in Los Angeles from September 24 to November 19, 2009.

Strole played the role of Vera Dundee in The Metal Children, written and directed by Adam Rapp, from May 5 to June 13, 2010 at the Vineyard Theatre. From March through April 2012, she appeared in Dan LeFranc's The Big Meal at Playwrights Horizons.

She was seen alongside Edie Falco in the Manhattan Theatre Club production of The Madrid, which began previews on February 5, 2013, and opened on February 26, 2013. The show ran until May 5, 2013, after it had been extended.

Strole appeared in the Signature Theatre Company production of Kung Fu by David Henry Hwang. The play ran from February 4 through April 6, 2014 at the Pershing Square Signature Center. In October 2014, Strole played Lena in The Other Room, a solo show performed as part of Premieres' Inner Voices series.

In 2022, she took part in the HBO documentary film Spring Awakening: Those You've Known, which saw the 15 year reunion of the original cast of the musical.

=== Film and television ===
Strole starred in The Time Travelers Convention, an original musical podcast about her trying to travel back in time into the dinosaur age. The musical premiered on YouTube in January 2011.

In 2006, she narrated the part of Clare, alongside Fred Berman, who narrated the part of Henry, in an audiobook version of The Time Traveler's Wife by Audrey Niffenegger which was published by Audible and HighBridge and runs a length of approximately 17 hours and 38 minutes.

Television credits include a recurring role as Jennifer on the FX Network's show Rescue Me. She has also had guest lead appearances on Law & Order: Criminal Intent, 30 Rock, Mercy, and Stella.

Strole starred as Sara in the 2009 film Sorority Wars. She starred as Epiphany Sellars in the 2008 film Hamlet 2 alongside Steve Coogan and her Spring Awakening co-star Skylar Astin. She sang "Raped in the Face" and "Rock Me Sexy Jesus" on the soundtrack with Astin and Coogan. Additional movie credits include Descent and My One and Only.

Strole's friend Lea Michele announced on Twitter in August 2013 that Strole was set to appear on Glee during its fifth season. Her character, Penny Owen, was a sophomore in college and Sam Evans's new love interest. She appeared in two episodes.

== Grammy awards ==
- Nomination/Win 2008: Best Musical Show Album Spring Awakening (Musical)

== Filmography ==
=== Stage ===
Year	Title	Role	Company/Venue
2001	A Different Moon	Jean	Penguin Repertory Theatre
2006–2008	Spring Awakening	Anna	Atlantic Theater Company Eugene O'Neill Theatre (Broadway)
2009	Mourning Becomes Electra	Hazel Niles	The New Group
2009	Parade	Essie	Center Theatre Group (Los Angeles)
2010	The Metal Children	Vera Dundee	Vineyard Theatre
2011	F2M	Lucy	New York Stage and Film
2012	The Big Meal	Nicole	Playwrights Horizons
2013	The Madrid	Sarah	Manhattan Theatre Club
2014	Kung Fu	Linda	Signature Theatre Company
2014	The Other Room	Lena	Premieres

=== Film ===
Year	Title	Role	Notes
2007	Descent	Innocent Girl	
2008	Hamlet 2	Epiphany Sellars	
2009	My One and Only	Wendy	
2009	Sorority Wars	Sara Snow	Television film
2011	The Lonely Pair		Short film

=== Television ===
Year	Title	Role	Notes
2004	Rescue Me	Jennifer	3 episodes: "Inches", "Alarm", "Immortal"
2005	Stella	Teenage Girl	Episode: "Amusement Park"
2005	Law & Order: Criminal Intent	Alexis Kippes	2 episodes: "In the Wee Small Hours" (parts 1 & 2)
2009	30 Rock	Becca	Episode: "Goodbye, My Friend"
2010	Mercy	Lily	Episode: "We're All Adults"
2013	Glee	Penny Owen	2 episodes: "Tina in the Sky with Diamonds", "A Katy or a Gaga"
2014	Submissions Only	Jill Peters	Episode: "Box of Dirt"
2018	GLOW	Susan	2 episodes: "Mother of All Matches", "Work the Leg"

=== Video games ===
Year	Title	Role	Notes
2006	Bully	Lola Lombardi	Voice and motion capture
2007	Manhunt 2	Daniel's Daughter, Asylum PA	Motion capture
2008	Grand Theft Auto IV	Businesswoman	
