= The Banker (2015 film) =

- Theatrical poster
- Directed by: Ikechukwu Onyeka
- Screenplay by: Yinka Ogun
- Produced by: Emem Isong; Nsikan Isaac
- Starring: Mbong Amata; Maureen Okpoko; Belinda Effah; Seun Akindele
- Edited by: Daniel Tom
- Music by: George Nathaniel
- Production company: Royal Arts Academy
- Release date: 16 May 2015
- Running time: 81 minutes
- Country: Nigeria
- Language: English

The Banker is a 2015 Nigerian drama film, produced and directed by Emem Isong and Ikechukwu Onyeka respectively. The film starred Mbong Amata, Maureen Okpoko, Belinda Effah and Seun Akindele. It premiered at Civic Center, Lagos on 16 May 2015.

The story is centered on how female bankers use their sexuality to get optimal benefits from prospective customers. It also visits the circumstances and the emotional pain they go through in fulfilling corporate targets, while addressing the stereotypical understanding from in-laws, and women whose husbands deal with female bankers in Nigeria.

== Plot ==
Chinwe is a female banker who is pressured professionally to use any means possible to ensure wealthy male clients open monetary accounts, irrespective of their demands. Her future father-in-law is of the opinion that all female bankers are promiscuous and wouldn't approve her marriage to his son. This leads him to sending several of his wealthy friends as potential client to try to lure her to have sexual relationships with them, to see if she will stand her ground.

== Cast ==
- Mbong Amata as Chinwe
- Ifeanyi Kalu as Kunle Jnr
- Emma Ayalogu as Kunle Snr
- Nichole Banna as Joke
- Donald Edet as Kunle's gateman
- Nsikan Isaac as Helen
- Shina Ogunjumelo as Sir Nwade
- Gregory Ojefua as Obi
- Maureen Okpoko as Vivian
- Seun Akindele as David
- Belinda Effah as Daisy Aburi

== Reception ==
Nollywood Reinvented gave the film a score of 2.5 out of 5, criticising it for lacking originality and being "very predictable". The film was also described as being unrealistic in some instances, but noted that the introduction of Seun Akindele in the latter part of the film brought some form of life to it.

On Talk African Movies, a review site that either "recommends" or "ejects" films; The Banker was "recommended", with the writer praising its "straight-to-the-point" approach. However, it felt the direction of the script was not completely in tune with reality. It also suggested that the story should have been more diverse, while praising Seun Akindele's performance.
