= Slipstream (2005 film) =

- DVD cover
- Directed by: David van Eyssen
- Written by: Louis Morneau; Phillip Badger
- Produced by: David Bixler; Frank Hübner; Brad Krevoy; David Lancaster; David Wicht
- Starring: Sean Astin; Vinnie Jones; Ivana Miličević; Kevin Otto
- Cinematography: Sönke Hansen
- Edited by: Toby Yates
- Music by: Rob Lord
- Distributed by: Eagle Entertainment; Lions Gate Home Entertainment; MC-One (Media Cooperation One) GmbH
- Release date: February 12, 2005
- Running time: 89 minutes
- Country: United States
- Language: English

Slipstream is a 2005 science fiction film, written by Louis Morneau and Phillip Badger and directed by David van Eyssen. The film stars Sean Astin, Vinnie Jones, and Ivana Miličević. It had its world premiere in 2005 at the London Sci-Fi and Fantasy Film Festival, where van Eyssen received the award for "Best New Director to SF/Action".

The film concerns the efforts of a socially inept scientist (Sean Astin) and a female FBI agent (Ivana Miličević) to recover a time travel device (called "Slipstream") that was stolen by a group of bank robbers commanded by Vinnie Jones.

== Plot ==
Stuart Conway has developed a hand-held, cellphone-like time travel device called "Slipstream" that allows the user to travel back in time 10 minutes by interfacing with a cellphone system regional antenna. At first, he uses the device primarily to try, albeit unsuccessfully, to arrange a date with a female bank clerk.

The final time he tries to use the device, a group of bank robbers commanded by Winston Briggs rush into the bank and demand the money from the vault. At the time, FBI agent Sarah Tanner and her male partner Jake are in the bank tracking Stuart. Tanner initiates a gunfight against Jake's advice. Both agents are armed with pistols, while the criminals are wielding automatic weapons. By the end of the fight, Jake is shot and killed because he chased the criminals outside the bank.

During the fight, Stuart had been shot in the chest by a stray bullet. Before he dies, Stuart takes Sarah and himself back in time to before the bank robbery, and Sarah unsuccessfully tries to foil the heist. Unfortunately, Briggs takes the Slipstream device as a souvenir. Stuart and Sarah realize it's only a matter of time before Briggs and his cronies discover the true potential of the device.

What follows is a high-speed car chase of the criminals, a hijacking of a bus, a highway shootout, and a shootout in and downing of a commercial airliner. Near the end, as a passenger in the falling airplane, Stuart is able to reverse the entire sequence of events because, being airborne, he has access to many cellphone relay systems and therefore is not restricted to the 10-minute limit. Stuart rewinds time to just before the bank robbery, taking Sarah with him, but Briggs grabs on as well and is rewinded too. This time Briggs decides not to rob the bank as he knows what will happen and that all of his men will die and he and his men leave without anyone being the wiser. This time Stuart is able to get a date with the teller by being himself and escapes using the Slipstream device from the bank when he is about to be arrested. Sarah is relieved that her partner is alive again and decides to let Stuart go as she knows that he's harmless. The movie ends with Stuart having fun using the Slipstream device.

== Cast ==
- Sean Astin as Stuart Conway
- Vinnie Jones as Winston Briggs
- Ivana Miličević as Sarah Tanner
- Kevin Otto as Jake Hallman
- Victoria Bartlett as Gillian
- Thorsten Wedekind as Cam
- Hakeem Kae-Kazim as Runson
- Grant Swanby as Tokin

== Production ==
Filming took place in South Africa during late 2003. The film was imagined as part science fiction, part action and part buddy comedy.

Sean Astin was chosen to portray the main character of Stuart Conway. Of the role, Astin has noted that he liked the movie's premise and that "Although they weren't offering much money, the prospect of going to South Africa was appealing to me."

== Release ==
Slipstream had its world premiere on February 3, 2005, at the London Sci-Fi and Fantasy Film Festival. It later screened on SyFy that same month.

== Reception ==
DVD Talk reviewed Slipstream, writing that "It's not particularly brilliant in any way, but neither is it boring ... and it's a whole helluva lot better than most of the movies bearing the "Sci-Fi Network" banner." Virginia Heffernan criticized the movie as "a bust", as she felt that it was a "handsome but vacuous caper movie". David Nusair of Reel Film was similarly critical, noting a kill from the villain midway through Slipstream that they stated was the "sort of jaw-dropping incompetence that quickly sinks Slipstream, a sci-fi film with a decent premise but little else.

=== Awards ===
- Best New Director to SF/Action (2005, won)
