= Mbong Amata =

Nigerian actress (born 1985)

- Born: 21 September 1985 (age 40)
- Occupation: actress
- Years active: 2005–
- Known for: 2nd runner up, 2004 Miss Nigeria
- Spouse: Jeta Amata (m. 2008; div. 2014)
- Children: 1

Mbong Amata (born 21 September 1985, née Odungide) is a Nigerian actress. She has appeared in films such as Black November, Forgetting June, and Inale. She won the "Most Beautiful Girl" (Akwa Ibom) in 2003 and was the 2nd runner up in the 2004 Miss Nigeria.

== Personal life ==
In 2001, at an audition in Calabar, she met Jeta Amata. Two years later when she was 18, they began dating. They married in 2008 and their daughter Veno was born later that year. In 2013, they separated and in 2014 they divorced.

Amata lives between Los Angeles and Lagos. People thought she had gone missing, but she later came out to debunk the news on social media.

== Filmography ==
Year	Title	Role	Notes
2005	Wheel of Change	Christabel	Directed by Jeta Amata
2006	The Amazing Grace	Ansa	Drama/History
2008	Mary Slessor	Ama	Episode: "The Beginning"
2009	Reloaded	Nira	
2010	Inale	Keke	Musical
2011	Black Gold	Ebiere	Drama
2012	Black November	Ebiere Perema	Action/Crime/Drama
2013	Forgetting June	June	Drama
2014	Champagne		
2014	Apaye	Suam	
2015	The Banker	Chinwe	Drama
2016	Darima's Dilemma	Darima	Drama
2017	A Little White Lie	Winnie	Drama/Romance
TBA	From Freetown		

== See also ==
- List of Nigerian actors
