= Seun Akindele =

Nigerian actor

- Citizenship: Nigerian
- Education: Lagos State University
- Occupation: Actor
- Years active: 2005 - present
- Notable work: The Antique (2014 film); The Banker (2015 film)

Seun Akindele is a Nigerian actor.

== Early life and education ==
Akindele was born on October 7. Despite being a native of Ekiti State, Akindele grew up in Jos, the capital city of Plateau State, Nigeria. He has a degree in history and international relations from Lagos State University.

== Career ==
Akindele's acting career began in 2005 after participating in the Amstel Malta Box Office. At the 2011 Best of Nollywood Awards, Akindele won the award for "most promising actor" for the year in review. He was nominated for "best kiss in a movie" alongside Yvonne Jegede for their role in The Ex in 2015. He also got a "best supporting actor" nomination for Miss Taken.

== Personal life ==
Akindele married Toun in 2016.

== Filmography ==
- Nation Under Siege (2013)
- Being Mrs Elliot (2014) as Efe
- The Antique (2014) as Invader 1
- The Banker (2015) as David
- The Department (2015) as Hakeem
- Dazzling Mirage (2014) as Walter
- Heroes and Villains (2015)
- My Woman (2016) as Faisar
- What Makes You Tick (2016) as Nosa Okojie
- Girls Are Not Smiling (2017)
- A Million Baby (2017) as Dave
- Flame (2018) as Yinka
- Dirty Dirtier (2018) as Dean
- Conundrum (2019) as Dr. Samon
- Executioner (2019) as Mustapha
- Crossroads (2020) as Detective Dare
- My Mirror (2021)
- Boiling Point (2021) as Studio Director
- The Set Up 2 (2022) as Mayowa Kuku
- Pregnancy (2023) as Victor
- House of Ga'a (2024) as Onisigun
- Lisabi: The Uprising (2024) as Oduyale

== Awards and nominations ==
Year	Award ceremony	Category	Film	Result	Ref
2021	Best of Nollywood Awards	Best Supporting Actor –English	Greyish	Nominated	
