= The Show (2017 film) =

2017 film by Giancarlo Esposito

- Directed by: Giancarlo Esposito
- Written by: Kenny Yakkel; Noah Pink
- Produced by: Christopher D'Elia; Giancarlo Esposito; Lawreen Kayl; Michael Klein
- Starring: Josh Duhamel; Famke Janssen; Giancarlo Esposito; Sarah Wayne Callies; Caitlin FitzGerald
- Cinematography: Paul Mitchnick
- Edited by: Jamie Alain
- Music by: Rich Walters
- Production company: Dobre Films
- Distributed by: Grindstone Entertainment Group
- Release dates: March 11, 2017 (South by Southwest); September 15, 2017 (United States)
- Running time: 104 minutes
- Country: United States
- Language: English

The Show (originally titled This Is Your Death) is a 2017 American satirical drama film directed by Giancarlo Esposito and written by Kenny Yakkel and Noah Pink. The film stars Josh Duhamel, Famke Janssen, Esposito, Sarah Wayne Callies, and Caitlin FitzGerald and is basically a loose remake of Network (1976 film).

== Plot ==
During the final scene of a live reality TV show in Seattle, Married to a Millionaire, the jilted bride shoots dead the millionaire who rejected her. She then takes aim at the bride he chose, but the show's host, Adam Rogers (Duhamel), throws himself in front of her, saving her life. Her attempt thwarted, the jilted bride places the gun barrel in her mouth and pulls the trigger. Adam is then hailed as a hero.

On the same station's morning show the following day, Adam, still stunned from the previous day's events, insists he is not a hero, and rants that the horrific outcome is his fault, the fault of the network, and that of all those who indulge in such entertainment. He is summoned to a meeting of the network execs, headed by Ilana Katzenberg (Janssen), President of programming. Believing his outburst has put his job at risk, he is shocked to find that, instead of being fired, he is asked to host a new show, during which contestants will commit suicide in a live broadcast. Adamant against promoting death, he refuses the offer and walks out. The next day, he decides to accept the offer, but only on the condition that this platform is used to encourage viewers to appreciate life, as he feels a higher purpose is involved. His producer, Sylvia Rowland (FitzGerald), doesn't wish to be a part of the show in any form, but is under contract and has no other option.

Mason Washington (Esposito), a janitor working in the studio offices, has a wife, daughter, and disabled son. After requesting more hours so as to qualify for medical benefits, he loses his job, worsening his struggle to make ends meet. Upon learning of his dismissal, and that their mortgage payments are in arrears, Mason's wife, Rebecca (Walters), tells him that if they lose their home, she will have no choice but to leave him and take the children. He promises to find more work.

The new show has been titled This Is Your Death, and as the first episode opens, Adam touts his idealistic principles, telling the audience that his intention is to promote the appreciation of life and that one person's death can improve the life of another. Viewers are asked to donate toward each contestant's specific needs. His first contestant is a battered wife at the end of her rope, who hopes to give her daughter a better life through her death. She electrocutes herself in a bathtub on stage after revealing she had murdered her abusive husband. Adam's sister, Karina (Callies), is a pediatric oncology nurse in a local hospital and is tending to her patient, Elliott (Grüter-Andrew), when she sees Adam's show on Elliott's TV. She is disgusted by such a concept that so conflicts with her sensibilities and caring nature.

As the show grows in popularity, Adam starts to lose his idealistic views and becomes more concerned with ratings and sensationalism. When a woman's carbon monoxide asphyxiation takes longer than expected, the crew decides to fake the death for the audience, and let her die off-stage. When she partially revives and frantically tries to escape her car, Adam forces her back inside, unaware that the camera inside the car is still filming. Sylvia witnesses the murder and makes a copy of the footage. Talk gets around that the death was faked, and the FBI takes notice.

Karina feels Adam is losing his way and tries to confront him, but he only distances himself from her. After their parents' death years earlier, Adam had supported Karina through her depression and drug addiction and recovery. Now experiencing a breakdown over the loss of his support, and feeling judged because of their connection, she relapses and is caught pilfering drugs from the hospital.

As a last resort, Mason auditions for the season finale of This Is Your Death, where one of three chosen contestants will earn a million dollars. He gets a spot on the show but tells his family he has gotten a wonderful new job and must go take a training course when he is actually heading to the studio to be the third scheduled suicide.

After the first suicide by hara-kiri, Adam is horrified to see that Karina is to be the second contestant. Distraught over the distance between them, it is her last attempt to get through to him and make him end his involvement in the show and make others see the awful reality of it. She is lying on a gurney, holding a syringe to her arm. Adam races to stop her, but arrives at her side only to have her die in his arms. He follows as her body is taken away, and collapses, sobbing, on the street outside the studio.

Wired with explosives and gripping a detonator button, Mason takes the stage as the final contestant. He begins to cry and refuses to press the button. Hearing about his life story, the audience begins to cheer as Mason leaves the stage to go home.

As Mason and Sylvia leave the building, she hands the copy of the incriminating film clip to the FBI agents as they are about to collect Adam, who yells wildly at the gawking crowd as he is led away to turn off their cameras.

== Cast ==
- Josh Duhamel as Adam Rogers, a game show host.
- Famke Janssen as Ilana Katzenberg, a network executive.
- Giancarlo Esposito as Mason Washington, a man struggling to keep his family afloat.
- Sarah Wayne Callies as Karina
- Caitlin FitzGerald as Sylvia Rowland
- Lucia Walters as Rebecca Washington
- Cory Grüter-Andrew as Elliott
- Chelah Horsdal as Elliott's Mom
- Chris Ellis as Keller
- Scott Lyster as Zack
- James Franco as Morning Show Host

== Production ==
On October 29, 2015, it was announced that Giancarlo Esposito would next direct a drama film This Is Your Death based on the script by Kenny Yakkel and Noah Pink. Great Point Media would fully finance the film and would also produce along with Esposito, Lawreen Yakkel, and Dobre Films' Christopher D'Elia and Michael Klein.

Principal photography on the film began on November 15, 2015 in Vancouver, British Columbia, and it wrapped up on December 11, 2015.

== Awards and nominations ==
Year	Award	Category	Nominee(s)	Result
2017	19th Leo Awards	Best Supporting Performance by a Female in a Motion Picture	Sarah Wayne Callies	Nominated
2017	19th Leo Awards	Best Cinematography in a Motion Picture	Paul Mitchnick	Nominated
2017	19th Leo Awards	Best Picture Editing in a Motion Picture	Jamie Alain	Nominated
2017	19th Leo Awards	Best Sound in a Motion Picture	Kelly Cole, Bill Mellow, Hugh Wielenga, Matt Dawson, and Sandra Portman	Nominated
