= Sorority Wars =

- DVD cover
- Genre: Comedy drama
- Written by: Michelle Lovretta
- Directed by: James Hayman
- Starring: Lucy Hale; Courtney Thorne-Smith; Phoebe Strole; Amanda Schull; Rob Mayes; Faith Ford
- Composer: Danny Lux
- Country of origin: United States
- Original language: English

Production
- Producer: Ted Bauman
- Cinematography: Neil Roach
- Editor: Scot Kelly
- Running time: 89 minutes
- Production companies: Von Zerneck/Sertner Films; Patricia Clifford Productions; RHI Entertainment

Original release
- Network: Lifetime
- Release: October 17, 2009

Sorority Wars is a 2009 American comedy-drama television film directed by James Hayman and written by Michelle Lovretta. It stars Lucy Hale, Courtney Thorne-Smith, Phoebe Strole, Amanda Schull, Rob Mayes, and Faith Ford. The film was shot in Vancouver and premiered on Lifetime on October 17, 2009.

== Premise ==
18-year-old Katie Parker (Lucy Hale) and her best friend Sara Snow (Phoebe Strole) are planning to rush into the Delta sorority, which was founded 27 years ago by Katie's mother Lutie (Courtney Thorne-Smith) and Summer (Faith Ford), whose own daughter Gwen (Amanda Schull) is currently in charge of the Deltas on campus. However, when Katie overhears something troubling, it drives a wedge between her and every house on Sorority Row as she is now an outcast. To counter all the hate, she joins the rival house Kappas, but this just sparks a full-scale battle.

== Cast ==
- Lucy Hale as Katie Parker
- Courtney Thorne-Smith as Lutie Parker
- Amanda Schull as Gwen
- Phoebe Strole as Sara Snow
- Kristen Hager as Heather
- Rob Mayes as Beau
- Adrian Hough as William
- Sarah-Jane Redmond as Dana
- Chelan Simmons as Casadee
- Faith Ford as Summer
- Marie Avgeropoulos as Missy
- Scott Lyster as P.J.
- Christine Willes as Mary Lee Snow
- Catherine Lough Haggquist as Hilary
- Meredith Bailey as Sally
- Diana Bang as Lauren
- Andrea Brooks as Shawna
- Natasha Gulmans as Lana

== Reception ==
Reviews of the film were positive. Linda Stasi of the New York Post gave the movie a rating of 3.5 stars out of 4. She described it as "bizarrely entertaining in a mindless, I-need-to-veg-this-weekend kind of way." She praised lead actress Lucy Hale as "quite a talent". Writing for Variety, Brian Lowry had a similar opinion of the movie, calling it "moderately engaging" and "cheerfully mindless". He said that Hale was "very appealing".
