= A Private Storm =

- Theatrical release poster
- Directed by: Lancelot Oduwa Imasuen; Ikechukwu Onyeka
- Written by: Vivian Ejike
- Produced by: Vivian Ejike
- Starring: Ramsey Nouah; Omotola Jalade Ekeinde; Ngozi Ezeonu; Ufuoma Ejenobor; John Dumelo; Blossom Chukwujekwu
- Cinematography: DJ Tee; Emma Olabode
- Edited by: Okey Benson
- Music by: Paul Play Dairo
- Production company: Purple Pine Studios
- Distributed by: Nollywood Distributions
- Release dates: 18 December 2010 (Lagos premiere); 9 February 2011 (Nigeria)
- Running time: 130 minutes
- Country: Nigeria

A Private Storm is a 2010 Nigerian romantic drama film, co-directed by Lancelot Oduwa Imasuen and Ikechukwu Onyeka. It stars Ramsey Nouah, Omotola Jalade Ekeinde, Ngozi Ezeonu, Ufuoma Ejenobor and John Dumelo. It was premiered on 18 December 2010 at Four Points Hotel, Lekki.

== Plot ==
Gina and Alex seem like the ideal couple from the outside, but the urge to always be in control of all aspect of Gina's life is threatening their relationship. Alex abuses her emotionally and physically anytime he sees her getting close to the opposite sex.

== Cast ==
- Ramsey Nouah as Alex
- Omotola Jolade-Ekeinde as Gina
- Ufuoma Ejenobor as Lisa
- John Dumelo as Jason
- Ngozi Ezeonu as Mrs. Jibuno
- Blossom Chukwujekwu as Tony
- Tessy Oragwa as Katie
- Christian Ajisafe as Uju
- Blessing Onwukwe as Ada
- Peace Awak as Juliet
- Alex Ayalogu as Mr. Jibuno
- Susan David as Joy
- Andy Jimmy as Young Jason

== Release ==
It premiered in Lagos on 18 December 2010. It was released theatrically on 9 February 2011 and on DVD on 10 December 2012.

== Reception ==
=== Critical reception ===
The film received a generally positive reception. It holds a 57% rating on Nollywood Reinvented, who praised the acting, music, story and originality. Nollywood Forever also praised the casting and storyline.

=== Accolades ===
It was nominated in seven categories at the 2012 Nollywood Movies Awards. It received seven nominations at the 2011 Best of Nollywood Awards and won the award for "Best Use of Costume". It received three nominations at the 7th Africa Movie Academy Awards including awards for Best Makeup, Best Supporting Actor and Best Nigerian Film

List of Awards
Award	Category	Recipients and nominees	Result
Africa Film Academy (7th Africa Movie Academy Awards)	Best Nigerian Film	Lancelot Oduwa Imasuen	Nominated
Africa Film Academy (7th Africa Movie Academy Awards)	Best Actor in a Supporting Role	John Dumelo	Nominated
Africa Film Academy (7th Africa Movie Academy Awards)	Achievement in Makeup		Nominated
Best of Nollywood Magazine (2011 Best of Nollywood Awards)	Best Lead Actress in an English Movie	Omotola Jalade Ekeinde	Nominated
Best of Nollywood Magazine (2011 Best of Nollywood Awards)	Best supporting Actress in an English Movie	Ufuoma Ejenobor	Nominated
Best of Nollywood Magazine (2011 Best of Nollywood Awards)	Best Actor in a Leading role (English)	Ramsey Nouah	Nominated
Best of Nollywood Magazine (2011 Best of Nollywood Awards)	Best Actor in a Supporting role (English)	John Dumelo	Nominated
Best of Nollywood Magazine (2011 Best of Nollywood Awards)	Movie of the Year	Lancelot Oduwa Imasuen	Nominated
Best of Nollywood Magazine (2011 Best of Nollywood Awards)	Best Use of Costume		Won
Best of Nollywood Magazine (2011 Best of Nollywood Awards)	Director of the Year	Lancelot Oduwa Imasuen, Ikechukwu Onyeka	Nominated
Nollywood Movies Network (2012 Nollywood Movies Awards)	Best Movie	Lancelot Oduwa Imasuen, Ikechukwu Onyeka	Nominated
Nollywood Movies Network (2012 Nollywood Movies Awards)	Best Actor in a Leading Role	Ramsey Nouah	Nominated
Nollywood Movies Network (2012 Nollywood Movies Awards)	Best Actor in a Supporting Role	John Dumelo	Nominated
Nollywood Movies Network (2012 Nollywood Movies Awards)	Best Actress in a Leading Role	Omotola Jalade Ekeinde	Nominated
Nollywood Movies Network (2012 Nollywood Movies Awards)	Best Directing	Lancelot Oduwa Imasuen	Nominated
Nollywood Movies Network (2012 Nollywood Movies Awards)	Best Cinematography	DJ Tee and Emma Olabode	Nominated
Nollywood Movies Network (2012 Nollywood Movies Awards)	Best Sound Editing/Design		Nominated
