= Black November =

2012 film by Jeta Amata

- Theatrical release poster
- Directed by: Jeta Amata
- Written by: Jeta Amata
- Produced by: Bernard Alexander; Jeta Amata; Ori Ayonmike; Marc Byers; Wilson Ebiye; Hakeem Kae-Kazim; Dede Mabiaku
- Starring: Hakeem Kae-Kazim; Mickey Rourke; Kim Basinger; Fred Amata; Sarah Wayne Callies; Vivica Fox; Nse Ikpe Etim; Anne Heche; OC Ukeje; Persia White; Akon; Wyclef Jean; Mbong Amata; Enyinna Nwigwe
- Narrated by: Kara Noble
- Cinematography: James Michael Costello; Tommy Maddox-Upshaw
- Edited by: Debbie Berman; Lindsay Kent; Adam Varney
- Music by: Joel Goffin
- Production companies: Wells & Jeta Entertainment
- Distributed by: eOne Entertainment (United States)
- Release dates: 8 May 2012 (Washington, D.C. premiere); 21 December 2012 (Nigeria)
- Running time: 95 minutes
- Countries: Nigeria; United States
- Language: English
- Budget: ₦2 billion (shared with Black Gold) (US$12.5 million)

Black November: Struggle for the Niger Delta is a 2012 Nigerian-American action drama film starring an ensemble cast that includes Hakeem Kae-Kazim, Mickey Rourke, Kim Basinger, Fred Amata, Sarah Wayne Callies, Nse Ikpe Etim, OC Ukeje, Vivica Fox, Anne Heche, Persia White, Akon, Wyclef Jean and Mbong Amata. It is directed and co-produced by Jeta Amata, and narrates the story of a Niger Delta community's struggle against their government and a multi-national oil corporation to save their environment which is being destroyed by excessive oil drilling.

Black November, which derived its title from the month in which activist Ken Saro-Wiwa was executed in 1995, is a reissued version of the 2011 film Black Gold. Approximately 60% of the scenes were reshot and additional scenes were added to make the film "more current". Black November is produced by Bernard Alexander, Ori Ayonmike, Marc Byers, Wilson Ebiye, Hakeem Kae-Kazim and Dede Mabiaku; production and marketing costs of the film totalled at US$22 million, and was majorly funded by a Nigerian oil baron.

The film, which is fiction based on actual events, premiered at the Kennedy Center on 8 May 2012, and was also screened on 26 September 2012, during the United Nations General Assembly; it was met with mixed to negative critical reviews. It, however, had significant impact after release; Amata and the film's associate producer, Lorenzo Omo-Aligbe, were invited to the White House regarding the film; Congressman Bobby Rush and his Republican colleague Jeff Fortenberry were also so affected by the film that they sponsored a joint resolution aimed at pressuring the Nigerian government and Western oil companies to clean up spills in the Niger Delta.

== Plot ==
In Warri prison in the Niger Delta a noose is being set up to hang Ebiere. It switches to Los Angeles, California; Tom Hudson, CEO of Western Oil is kidnapped on his way to the airport by a movement group tagged "United People's Front for the Emancipation of the Niger Delta People of Nigeria". The kidnap is carried out by Tamuno the leader of the movement), Timi, Opuwei, Timi and Pere after orchestrating an accident near the second street tunnel. Also kidnapped is a reporter, Kristy, and her cameraman. Tom Hudson, his wife and Kristy, together with several others at the accident scene are captured and held hostage within this tunnel which has already been closed off on both sides by the group. Seven hours, no communication is heard from the tunnel - the police, the anti-terrorism unit and the general public have no idea who the "terrorists" are or what they want. Meanwhile in the tunnel, Tamuno tells Tom that they are in Los Angeles to save Ebiere and declares that if Ebiere is eventually hung in Nigeria, then the "truly guilty" ones should go with her. He releases the women and children and instructs Kristy to record what is happening in the tunnel.

The film flashes back to 21 years earlier during military era as Tamuno narrates their ordeal to the public via Kristy's camera. Ebiere is born in Warri during the Military era; she concludes high school and is offered scholarship by Western Oil to study oversea. A few years later, an oil pipe in the Niger Delta bursts and the people of the community go to fetch petrol from the pipe, Dede, a fisherman discovers that fishes in the river have been killed by the oil spillage. The police arrive at the spillage site and demand that the Villagers vacate the area, but no one listens to them. Ebiere arrives in the village — her home, and is told her mother and siblings are getting fuel from a spillage site. On her way to the site, the site explodes killing her mother and siblings. The explosion appears to have been an accident, caused after one of the police officers sent to disperse the oil collectors lights a cigarette after having failed to do so. He is killed as well. Ebiere speaks up at a consolation visit of Western Oil staff (An oil rig American company based in Warri) and is applauded by members of the Community. This establishes her as one of the speakers for the Niger Delta Community, she is approached by Kate Summers, a reporter who likes her speech and says Ebiere is different from the rest of the community people, Kate becomes one of Ebiere's friends and supporters. Ebiere starts to organize peaceful protests and mass rallies for their voice to be heard, fighting for the Niger Delta to be cleaned up and well maintained — they are sometimes beaten, killed and/or arrested by the Military in the process. Ebiere is offered bribes severally by Western Oil representatives to stop her from instigating the people, but she always declines.

However, Dede, whose wife and only child died in the explosion, believes that protests will never solve anything and that the Government can only listen through violence. Dede starts to have people on his side (including Tamuno, who was a dedicated police officer) after an incident in which the Army invades their village and rapes their women, right in front of them. Ebiere continues with her protests while Dede forms a militant group, showing their displeasure through violence, vandalism and kidnapping Western Oil officials. Western Oil eventually convinces Ebiere (who is now Dede's love interest) to help ask Dede and his group for dialogue with government. It turns out to be a ploy to get them arrested. A shoot-out occurs, leading to Dede and his group being killed.

Chief Gadibia one of the chiefs who have been receiving bribes from Western Oil, and also embezzling funds meant for community development, tells his fellow elders that he is no longer interested in the "unclean" money and he wants to return his share to the people. Gadibia dies the following day, the Elders having poisoned his drink the previous night. Peter, Gadibia's son, to whom he has already confessed, explains the incident to Ebiere and how sure he is that his father was murdered by the Elders. Gadibia's stolen fund is discovered in his house and the other elders involved are captured by the community people, led by Ebiere. Ebiere wants the Elders to be reported to the police, but the people refuse to listen and set them ablaze instead. Everyone at the vicinity of the crime is arrested by the Police; Ebiere however claims responsibility for the crime and is sentenced to death by hanging. The film shifts back to the present in the Los Angeles tunnel; Tom Hudson calls Nigeria's Head of State and tells him to do something to stop the execution of Ebiere, but his request isn't granted. Angela of the US Anti-terrorism unit advises that the United States make a diplomatic call to the Nigerian Government, but the head of the department says they do not negotiate with terrorists. They eventually resolve to issue a deceptive press release, stating that Ebiere has been released. When the emancipation movement is informed about the release, they drop their weapons as a result and also release the rest of the hostages, including Tom Hudson. They are arrested by the United States Police, while Ebiere still gets hanged in Nigeria.

== Cast ==
- Mbong Amata as Ebiere Perema
- Hakeem Kae-Kazim as Dede
- Enyinna Nwigwe as Tamuno Alaibe
- Mickey Rourke as Tom Hudson
- Sarah Wayne Callies as Kate Summers
- Kim Basinger as Kristy
- OC Ukeje as Peter Gadibia
- Vivica Fox as Angela
- Persia White as Tracey
- Fred Amata as Gideon white
- Wyclef Jean as Timi Gabriel
- Akon as Opuwei
- Nse Ikpe-Etim as Ebiere's Attorney
- Barbara Soky as Franca
- Dede Mabiaku as Captain Hassan
- Zack Amata as Chief Kuku
- Isaac Yongo as Chief Gadibia
- William Goldman as Rick Peterson
- Anne Heche as Barbra
- Lanny Joon as Agent Cole
- Stefanie Kleine as Madeline
- Emmanuel Okhakhu as Chief Okon
- Ivar Brogger as Bellamy
- Nathin Butler as Jack
- Jane Unogwu as Hosanna
- Razaaq Adoti as Timi
- Cindy Vela as Dj star original

== Production ==
=== Development and inspiration ===
Jeta Amata, who grew up in the Niger Delta stated in an interview that it has been a while since he has wanted to make a film on the Niger Delta. He had written three scripts on it for about eight years; but as the issues kept escalating, it seemed more difficult to make "but I got to the point where I knew it just has to be now". Black November is fiction based on an actual event, the title being derived from the month in which activist Ken Saro-Wiwa was executed in 1995. Amata had once met Saro-Wiwa through his father and was affected by his death. The recent Niger Delta militancy further triggered Amata's interest to make the film; Jeta Amata had to meet with most of the Niger Delta ex-militants such as Asari Dokubo and Boyloaf to listen to their sides of the story. He stated in an interview: "What I'm doing is what they did, but without weapons." Amata explained that even though the film touched some political points, he is more concerned about the human parts of the story, about the feelings of the people and what they passed through: "We are not trying to fight the government, trying to fight the oil companies, no -- we are trying to repair what has been damaged". The film was majorly funded by a Nigerian business magnate, Captain Hosa Wells Okunbo, who says he does not want to go down in history as "just another rich merchant", he wants to give something back to the region that made him wealthy.

In late 2011, the director announced plans to reissue the film which had initially been finalized with the title Black Gold and released in early months of 2011. According to Amata, the film was "out of date": "It had to be more current. It had to adhere strictly to what was going on right now – the Arab spring and all that". This change resulted in approximately 60% part of Black Gold being reshot, but still sewn into the original plot of Black Gold. Mickey Rourke, Kim Basinger and Anne Heche who were not part of Black Gold were also added to the cast line-up of Black November. Akon and Wyclef Jean also later joined the set during the last lap of shoot in Los Angeles.

=== Filming ===
The movie was initially a U$300,000 project to raise consciousness on the oil spills and put an end to the poor treatment of Nigerians affected. As bigger challenges came up, changes were made, which led to the project taking up to US$16 million on production. The amount for production and marketing of the film totalled at approximately US$2.2million. Filming was done on location in the Niger Delta region and Los Angeles, California. Parts of the film were also shot in Makurdi. The film was produced by Wells and Jeta Entertainment, in conjunction with Rock City Entertainment, and Starkid Inc. A death threat was sent to the lead actor, Mbong Amata, during the course of making the film in 2011. The source of the threat still remains unknown, but was deduced to be from either a militant group or an oil company. There was a period during filming when some production equipment coming from overseas was seized by the Nigerian Customs Service. The cast of the film had to remain idle in their hotel for a week, while the equipment awaited customs' clearance. The film's visual effects were supervised by former Industrial Light & Magic animator Wes Takahashi.

=== Music and soundtrack ===
Black November

Soundtrack album by Joel Goffin
- Released: 25 February 2015
- Genre: Film soundtrack
- Length: 1:25:23
- Label: Bluestone Symphonics
- Producer: Joel Goffin

The music in Black November is composed and scored by Joel Goffin. The film also features independently produced songs from Akon, Dede Mabiaku and Mavado. On 25 February, the soundtrack album was digitally released by Bluestone Symphonics on Amazon and iTunes.

==== Track listing ====
No.	Title	Singer(s)	Length
1.	"Origins of Chaos"	Joel Goffin	10:31
2.	"The Delta"	Joel Goffin, Sage Sansone	2:33
3.	"Race to the Hospital"	Joel Goffin	7:03
4.	"The River"	Joel Goffin	5:24
5.	"Nigeria"	Joel Goffin	2:13
6.	"Are You Ready"	Joel Goffin	1:32
7.	"Arrival of Western Oil"	Joel Goffin	1:09
8.	"Rise Up"	Mavado, Akon, Rick Ross	3:07
9.	"The Raid"	Joel Goffin	3:06
10.	"Death of a Child"	Joel Goffin	4:24
11.	"A Night in Africa"	Joel Goffin	1:38
12.	"Stay with Me"	Joel Goffin	2:33
13.	"Ebiere and Dede"	Wizkid, Joel Goffin	2:44
14.	"The Beach"	Joel Goffin	4:30
15.	"For Dede"	Joel Goffin	1:57
16.	"Retaliation"	Joel Goffin, Sage Sansone	2:23
17.	"Ghosts in a Cemetary [sic]"	Joel Goffin, Sage Sansone	2:18
18.	"Blood on My Hands (Extended Version)"	Joel Goffin	8:01
19.	"Guilty"	Joel Goffin	0:39
20.	"Sanctuary"	Joel Goffin	1:38
21.	"Navigating the Tunnel"	Joel Goffin	2:12
22.	"Requiem for Lost Souls"	Joel Goffin	3:34
23.	"A Love Slowly Dying"	Joel Goffin	1:23
24.	"Just Admit It"	Joel Goffin	1:47
25.	"Ebiere Perema"	Joel Goffin	1:54
26.	"Rites"	Joel Goffin, Sage Sansone	2:53
27.	"Africa"	Joel Goffin	2:17
Total length:			1:25:23

== Release ==
The trailer for Black November was released to the public via YouTube on 4 April 2012. The film premiered at the Kennedy Center on 8 May 2012. Special guests at the event included Agbani Darego, Dan Glickman, Gabon Ambassador Michael Moussa, former US ambassador Shirley Barnes, Robin Sanders and Isyaku Ibrahim. It also screened on 26 September 2012, during the United Nations General Assembly in New York City, which was attended by major casts of the film. Some other actors and stakeholders were also present at the event. It went on general release in Nigeria on 21 December 2012. A US trailer for the film was released on 15 December 2014, and the film was theatrically released in the United States by eOne Entertainment on 9 January 2015. The film was also released on DVD, iTunes, Amazon, and other VOD platforms in 2015.

== Reception ==
=== Critical reception ===
Black November received mixed to negative reviews. As of June 2020, it holds a 23% approval rating on Rotten Tomatoes, based on 13 reviews with an aggregate score of 3.54 out of 10, from twelve critics. It has a 31 score on Metacritic, which indicates a "generally unfavorable reviews".

It has a 67% rating on Nollywood Reinvented which says the film "strikes immediately as an emotionally compelling story that brings to the forefront a highly relevant political issue". It however talked down on the character development and concluded by stating: "Black November was a brilliant work of cinematography with an engaging and cohesive storyline that could have done with a little more character development for the protagonist". The website however noted Mbong Amata's performance as her "most convincing performance till date". The Africa Report states; "Black November is not perfect, but it's good". Mbong Amata's performance is described as "impressive" and it concluded by saying; "It [Black November] is a moving, enraging, chilling, kick-ass adventure story about greed, brutality and injustice". Toni Kan on Nigerian Entertainment Today comments that the film has a good story, but Amata "misses the plot". He panned the performances from the actors and concludes: "Black November attempts to be many things all at once; it is both advocacy and propaganda, Nollywood and Hollywood but it fails woefully in becoming something of character and substance. Jeta Amata has made what should have been a very important movie, but he totally mis-handles the opportunity. Which is a damn shame!".

Nicolas Rapold of The New York Times concludes: "Mr. Amata retains the emphatic Nollywood acting style, which almost becomes a form of agitprop. Every other conversation feels as if conducted at or beyond the pitch of an argument. Violence isn’t held back. Mr. Amata also reserves some disdain for his compatriots. There’s a go-for-broke vigor to the way Mr. Amata cuts to the conflict in most scenes, but the heavy-handedness across the board imposes some significant limitations. Mr. Amata, though, pulls no punches with his ending". Martin Tsai of the Los Angeles Times comments: "Black November dramatizes the outfit's mission, enemies and tactics almost in bullet-point form, eschewing any complexities in its onslaught. Jeta Amata always seems overreaching for the right buttons to push, [as] the filmmaker has trouble developing scenes, characters and plots". Frank Scheck of The Hollywood Reporter concludes: "Filled with declamatory speeches, stereotypical characters and heavily telegraphed, melodramatic plot developments, the film fails to work as either thriller or politically themed drama. Unfortunately, it will take a far stronger effort than Black November to provoke greater interest". Guy Lodge of Variety concludes: "while the presence upfront of Kim Basinger and Mickey Rourke lends the initial impression of cheerfully cheesy exploitation fare, their contributions turn out to be marginal: Auds [Audience] chasing cheap thrills will be caught off guard by this earnestly angry study of Nigeria’s corruption-riddled oil industry, superficially bracketed by a standard-issue, Los Angeles-set hostage drama. Sadly, Jeta Amata’s film proves plodding and sanctimonious in either register".

=== Response ===
Black November has had significant impact; Amata and associate producer Lorenzo Omo-Aligbe were invited to the White House regarding the film; Congressman Bobby Rush and his Republican colleague Jeff Fortenberry were so affected by the film that they sponsored a joint resolution aimed at pressurizing the Nigerian government and Western oil companies to clean up spills in the Niger Delta.

== Themes ==
Fatima Sesay of Sahara Reporters states; "Black November narrates the true story of the corruption and greedy tactics used by multi-national oil corporations and the Nigerian government to hide the truth about the oils spills in the Niger Delta, while making a large sum of money from exporting what really belongs to the Nigerian citizens. Sadly, the people most affected by the spills get rewarded not even a penny for their agony". Amata stated in an interview that the purpose of the film is to "bring to light the injustice and inhumane situation of the Niger Delta", he also said "If BP can be made to compensate the people of the Gulf of Mexico, why can't the world make the oil companies polluting our land make amends? We have been suffering spills the size of Exxon Valdez for 50 years, yet no one talks about it, as long as they benefit from the oil." The producer of the film Dede Mabiaku says Black November is "an eye-opening movie with a cause" which he says should be able to encourage people to fight for the immediate clean-up of the Niger Delta. The Guardian states; "Amata's film is weighing into the 50-year history of western exploitation of the delta's oil resources, local collusion and violent resistance to it".

== Historical references and accuracy ==
For more than 50 years, there were oil spills every year in the Niger Delta, with nothing done to prevent new spills. The contamination was never cleaned, thereby leaving the water undrinkable, the lands infertile and causing the death of wildlife and aquatic lives. The conditions were compared to the BP oil spill in the Gulf of Mexico.

Ken Saro-Wiwa, a writer hailing from Ogoniland of the Niger Delta, was a regular critic of the Nigerian Government. In the 1990s, he led many protests, fighting for the Niger Delta oil pollution to be cleaned up and well maintained. He was one of the pioneers of the "Movement for the Survival of the Ogoni People (MOSOP)". Many of the Delta protests led by Saro-Wiwa targeted oil giant company Royal Dutch Shell, who was a major player in the Nigerian oil business at the time. In 1995, Saro-Wiwa along with nine other environmentalists were arrested and executed by the then military dictatorship Government of Sani Abacha. The news generated international outrage, leading to the suspension of Nigeria from the British Commonwealth until 1999.

As of 2006, the situation in Ogoniland has eased significantly, assisted by the transition to democratic rule in 1999. However, no attempts were made by the government or an international body to bring about justice by investigating and prosecuting those involved in the violence and property destruction that have occurred in Ogoniland. However, Royal Dutch Shell was sued by families of the activists, who accused the company of complicity in the deaths. The company said it never advocated any act of violence against the activists and tried to persuade the government to grant clemency. In 2009, the company agreed to an out-of-court settlement with the families, paying them US$15.5 million.

In 2009, the Nigerian Government granted Amnesty and an unconditional pardon to Militants in the Niger Delta, which lasted for 60 days, starting 6 August 2009 and ending 4 October 2009. During the 60-day period armed youths surrendered their weapons to the Government in return for training and rehabilitation. The Government also launched a programme tagged: "Niger Delta Youth Empowerment Project (YEP)" which aimed to take care of Job Creation, Conflict Prevention Initiatives, technical/vocational skills acquisition, reduction in the level of poverty and stimulation of sustainable development in the Niger Delta. YEP was established as a direct response to the recurrent youth conflicts in the Niger Delta at the time.

== See also ==
- Movement for the Emancipation of the Niger Delta
- Movement for the Survival of the Ogoni People
- Niger Delta People's Volunteer Force
- Petroleum industry in Nigeria
