= 2011 Best of Nollywood Awards =

3rd Best of Nollywood Awards
- Date: 11 November 2011
- Site: Lagoon Restaurant, Lagos, Lagos State, Nigeria
- Hosted by: Ini Edo and Tee A
- Organized by: Best of Nollywood Magazine

The 3rd Best Of Nollywood Awards were held on Friday November 11, 2011 at the Lagoon Restaurant, Lagos. Top musical artist like JJC, W4, Capital F.E.M.I & Adol performed during the event.

Best Lead Actress in an English Movie	Best supporting Actress in an English Movie
Nse Ikpe Etim (Mr. and Mrs.); Omotola Jalade Ekeinde (A Private Storm); Genevieve Nnaji (The Mirror Boy); Omoni Oboli (Anchor Baby); Uche Jombo (Damage)	Susan Peters (Bursting Out); Ufuoma Ejenobor (Private Storm); Chelsea Eze (Two Brides and a Baby); Chika Ike (Criminal Mind); Queen Nwokoye (Cry of a Widow)
Best Actor in a Leading role (English)	Best Actor in a supporting role (English)
Joseph Benjamin (actor) (Mr. & Mrs.); Ramsey Nouah (Private Storm); Trybson (Ghetto Dreams); Kenneth Okonkwo (Soul to Soul); OC Ukeje (Two Brides and A Baby)	Gabriel Afolayan (Ghetto Dreams); Kalu Ikeagwu (Two Brides and a Baby); John Ommelo A Private Storm; Paul Apel (Mr. & Mrs.); Segun Arinze (Save our Soul)
Best Actress in a Leading role (yoruba)	Best Actor in a supporting role (yoruba)
Fathia Balogun (Ajaa Meji); Eniola Badmus (Eefa); Laide Bakare (Demilade); Toyin Aimakhu (Ikudoro); Sola Kosoko (Sindara)	Sunkanmi Omobolanle (Eti Keta); Gabriel Afolayan (Richie Richie); Ibrahim Chatta (Kuta Nle); Taiwo Ibikunle (Demilade); Damola Olatunji (Ore Meji)
Best Actor in a Leading role (yoruba)	Best Actress in a supporting role (yoruba)
Muyiwa Ademola (Iyo Aye); Saidi Balogun (Eti Keta); Eniola Olaniyan (Kuta Nle); Odunlade Adekola (Jelili); Femi Adebayo (21 Years)	Ronke Odusanya (Fari Kola); Funke Adesiyan (Eti Keta); Mosun Filani (Iyo Aye); Regina Chukwu (Ere Ori Igi); Macdonald Robinson (Richie)
Revelation of the Year (male)	Revelation of the Year (female)
Seun Akindele; Okey Uzoechi (Two Brides & A Baby); Deji Akinosho (Ikudoro); Paul Apel (90 Ninth day)	Bidemi Kosoko (Ikudoro); Ketra Hewatech (Two Brides and a Baby); Funmi Odufuwa (Richie Richie); Funmi Oguntade (Eje Ati Wura); Seyi Ashekun (Farikola)
Movie of the Year	Comedy Movie of the Year
Two Brides and a Baby; Eefa; Mirror Boy; Mr. & Mrs.; A Private Storm	Jelili; Osas; Okon Lagos; Baba noRegret
Cinematography of the Year	Best Use of Costume
Eefa; Two Brides and a Baby; Inale; 90 Ninth Day; The Mirror Boy	Private Storm; Inale; Two Brides and a Baby; Bursting Loose; Eefa
Director of the Year	Soundtrack of the Year
Teco Benson (Two Brides and a Baby); Bayo Tijani (Eefa); Obi Emelonye (The Mirror Boy); Jeta Amata (Inale); Lancelot Oduwa Imasuen & Ikechukwu Onyeka (Private Storm)	Inale; Kuta Ile; Eefa; Damage; Farikole
Best Child Actor of the Year	Marketer of the Year
Nicole Ndigwu (Damage); Hammond Oghomwen (Damage); Gbemi Obideyi (Ipinya Ife); Edward Kagutozi (Mirror Boy)	Nollywood Distribution; Epsalumn; Corporate Pictures; Kush; Magic Movies
Editing of the Year	Best Movie with Message for Society Change
Mr. & Mrs.; Eefa; Two Brides and a Baby; Damage; 90ninthday	Damage; Iyo Aye; Save our Soul; Omo Ghetto 2; Ere Ori Igi
Media Print of the Year	TV media of the year
Nonye Iwaugwu (Punch); Victor Akande (Nation); Vivian Onvorah (City People); Tade Afisat (National Encomium); Akin Sokoya (Excellence)	Juliet Ngborukwe (Village Square); Abdul (Silverbird); AIT; Efe Tommy (Excite on TV)
Online Media of the Year	Best Sound in a film
www.nollywooduncut.com; www.nigerianfilms.com; www.bellanaija.com	Two Brides and a Baby; 90 Ninth Day; Eefa; Mirror Boy; Inale
Screenplay of the Year	Best Crossover in a film
Blessing Effiong (Two Brides and a Baby); Kenny Olorunyomi (Ere Ori Igi); Uche Jombo & Rita Onuwrah (Damage)	Eniola Badmus (Blackberry Babes); Uche Jombo (Dewunmi Iberu); Kate Henshaw (EtiKeta); Femi Adebayo (Ladies Gang)
Best kiss in a Nigerian movie	Best Movie from a Nigerian in Diaspora
Genevieve Nnaji & Majid Michel (Bursting Loose); Uche Jombo & Kalu Ikeagwu (Damage); Odunlade Adekola & Toks Latona (Booku); Tonto Dike & Muna (Dirty Secrets)	The Mirror Boy (Obi Emenloye); Anchor Baby (Lonzo Nzekwe)
Fresh Scandal Free Actress	Best Radio Presenter
Queen Nwokoye	Matse Uwase
