= Joel Goffin =

American film composer and music producer

- Born: Joel Christian Goffin; December 7, 1981 (age 44)
- Origin: Houghton, Michigan, USA
- Genres: Film score, classical, ambient, experimental, electronica
- Occupations: Composer, Producer, Record Producer
- Instruments: Piano, Keyboard, Violin, Cello, Guitar
- Years active: 2003 – present
- Label: Bluestone Symphonics
- Website: www.joelgoffin.com

Joel Christian Goffin (born December 7, 1981) is an American film composer and music producer.

Goffin formed The Midnight Foundation musical group with Andrew Suhren. He was a cast member of the 2003 short film Dead Wait directed and written by Alton Glass.

The Midnight Foundation in 2007'.

In 2011, his work on the soundtrack for the film Inale won Best Soundtrack at the Africa Movie Academy Awards.

== Awards ==
St Tropez International Film Festival

- 2015: Cotton (Best Original Score) Won

Blue Whiskey Independent Film Festival

- 2015: Cotton (Best Original Score) Won

NAFCA Awards

- 2015: Black November (Best Original Score) Nominated

== Filmography ==
| Year | Title | Role |
|---|---|---|
| 2021 | Black Mail | Composer |
| 2020 | Badamasi The Oratory | Composer |
| 2019 | Automation The American King (As Told by an African Priestess) Ghost Town Road To Redemption | Composer |
| 2018 | Blue Crossing Dead End | Composer |
| 2016 | Going Furthur Sins of the Wicked Love Addict Legacy of the Wicked | Composer |
| 2015 | Sons of the Wicked | Composer |
| 2014 | Cotton Dawn in the Creeks | Composer |
| 2013 | Wreck Trek (TV Series) 9 episodes | Composer, Music Supervisor, Music Coordinator |
| 2012 | At the End Black November | Composer |
| 2011 | Black Gold | Composer |
| 2010 | Inale Peace Through Education: Stealing The Light | Composer |
