= Hakeem Kae-Kazim =

Nigerian actor (born 1962)

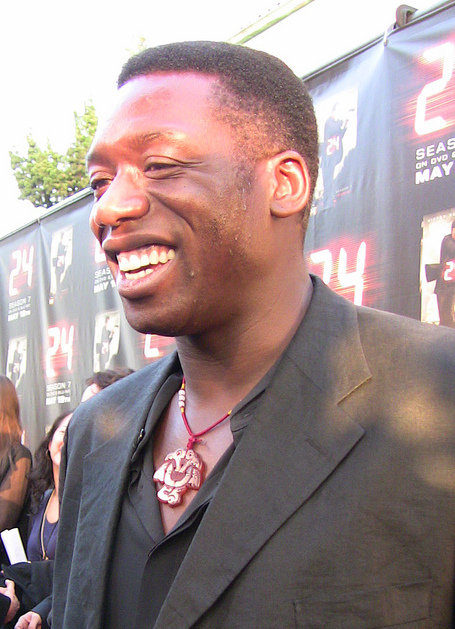
- Kae-Kazim at a 24 screening event in Los Angeles (2009)
- Born: 1 October 1962 (age 64); Lagos, Nigeria
- Education: Bristol Old Vic Theatre School
- Occupations: Actor; producer
- Years active: 1987–present
- Children: 3

Hakeem Kae-Kazim ( /hɑːˈkiːm ˌkeɪ ˈkæzɪm/; born 1 October 1962) is a Nigerian-British actor and producer. He portrayed Georges Rutaganda in the film Hotel Rwanda (2004) and won a SAFTA for his performance in the film Riding with Sugar (2020). He produced and starred in Man on Ground (2011), for which he received two Africa Movie Academy Award nominations.

On television, Kae-Kazim is known for his roles in the CBC miniseries Human Cargo (2004), the Starz series Black Sails (2014–2016), and the BBC series Troy: Fall of a City (2018).

== Early life ==
Kae-Kazim was born in Lagos State to a family from Abeokuta, Ogun State in the southwestern region of Nigeria and relocated to south London when he was a baby. His interest in acting began with school plays and the National Youth Theatre, where he discovered his "love for theatre, for acting". He trained at the Bristol Old Vic Theatre School, graduating in 1987 and was offered a space with the Royal Shakespeare Company, where he continued his classical training.

== Career ==
After working alongside Brian Cox and Ian McKellen at the Royal National Theatre, Kae-Kazim began appearing on British television in episodes of The District Nurse, The Bill, Saracen, Screen One, and Love Hurts. In 1994, he landed his first recurring role as Mr Manyeke in the seventeenth series the BBC children's series Grange Hill. He then appeared in the ITV police procedural Trial & Retribution.

Kae-Kazim began living and working in South Africa when he was 25. He made his feature film debut in Ross Kettle's After the Rain (1999) alongside Louise Lombard and Paul Bettany. However, it was his role as Georges Rutaganda in the 2004 Academy Award-nominated film Hotel Rwanda, which brought him to international attention. That same year, he starred in the Canadian CBC miniseries Human Cargo, for which Kae-Kazim was nominated for a Gemini Award. He then appeared in the Syfy and BBC miniseries The Triangle.

Following the success of Hotel Rwanda, Kae-Kazim went on to appear in the films Slipstream alongside Sean Astin and The Front Line before playing Captain Jockard in Pirates of the Caribbean: At World's End. Kae-Kazim made guest appearances in the likes of Lost, Law & Order: Special Victims Unit and Criminal Minds. He joined the cast of the Fox series 24 as Colonel Iké Dubaku for its 2008 tie-in television film 24: Redemption and its 2009 seventh season in 2009.

Kae-Kazim starred in the Nigerian films Inale (2010) and Last Flight to Abuja (2012), and also appeared in Half of a Yellow Sun. He produced and starred in Man on Ground (2011) about Nigerian immigrants to South Africa, earning Kae-Kazim nominations for Best Film and Best Actor at the 8th Africa Movie Academy Awards. He also had producing credits on the films Black Gold and Black November.

From 2014 to 2016, Kae-Kazim was in the main cast of the Michael Bay-produced Starz series Black Sails for its first three seasons as Mr Scott. Kae-Kazim stated his character was based on Black Caesar, a real life pirate of the time. He had a recurring role in second season of Dominion on Syfy, played Samson in part one of the 2016 miniseries remake of Roots on the History Channel, and had a role in the action horror film Daylight's End. In November 2017, Kae-Kazim was cast in the recurring role of Cesil Colby in the CW reboot series Dynasty. That same year, he appeared in the action film 24 Hours to Live.

Kae-Kazim starred in the 2018 BBC fantasy series Troy: Fall of a City as Zeus, king of the Olympians. This was followed by a recurring role in season 2 of the Fox series Deep State.

For his performance in the 2020 Netflix film Riding with Sugar, Kae-Kazim won the South African Film and Television Award (SAFTA) for Best Supporting Actor in a Feature Film. He also appeared in the BBC America adaptation of Terry Pratchett's The Watch and the Sky One series Intergalactic, as well as the films Black Beauty, The Shuroo Process, and Godzilla vs. Kong. In 2022, Kae-Kazim starred in the Nigerian epic fantasy film Aníkúlápó and as Majordome the Starz adaptation of Dangerous Liaisons. In January 2022, it was announced he would make his directorial debut with the upcoming feature film It's the Blackness, set in South London where Kae-Kazim grew up.

=== Voiceover work ===
Called the "Man with a Beautiful Voice", Kae-Kazim has done extensive voice-over work. His voice has been featured in a number of well known video games including Final Fantasy XIV, Halo 3 ODST, Halo: Reach, Guild Wars, Pirates of the Caribbean: At World's End, The Golden Compass and The Saboteur. Kae-Kazim has spoken of voice-over work as being "a lot of fun", and something he enjoys doing.

== Philanthropy ==
Kae-Kazim is an appointed global ambassador for Africa 2.0, a civil society organisation providing a platform for emerging and established African leaders to drive forward the transformation of Africa.

Speaking about his role as ambassador, Kae-Kazim said: "I am truly honoured to be associated with Africa 2.0 – a pioneering platform for a new generation of African leaders to inspire and create a solid infrastructure- to shape a brighter future for our continent".

== Personal life ==
Kae-Kazim and his South African wife Bronwyn have three daughters. He has lived and worked in South Africa, the United Kingdom, the United States, and Nigeria over the course of his career.

== Filmography ==
=== Filmmaking ===
Year	Title	Director	Producer	Notes
2003	God Is African	No	Yes	
2004	Coming to South Africa	No	Yes	Direct-to-video
2005	Coming to South Africa 2	No	Yes	Direct-to-video
2011	Black Gold	No	Yes	
2011	Man on Ground	No	Yes	
2012	Black November	No	Yes	
2017	Bypass	No	Associate	
2019	Comatose	No	Associate	
2020	Mugabe	No	Associate	
2020	Cracka	No	Co	Television film
TBA	It's the Blackness	Yes	No	

=== Film ===
Year	Title	Role	Notes
1999	After the Rain	Bingo	
1999	The Secret Laughter of Women	Dr. Ade	
2002	Global Effect	Satto	
2003	God Is African	Femi	
2004	Critical Assignment	Jomo	
2004	Coming to South Africa	Mike	Direct-to-video
2004	Hotel Rwanda	Georges Rutaganda	
2005	Coming to South Africa 2	Mike	Direct-to-video
2005	Slipstream	Runson	
2005	Out on a Limb	D.I. Edwards	
2005	Othello: A South African Tale	Iago	
2006	The Front Line	Erasmus	
2007	Pirates of the Caribbean: At World's End	Captain Jocard	
2007	Big Fellas	Ray Whitehead	
2007	Othello	Iago	
2007	The Jinn	Ahmad	
2008	Tony 5	Preacher	
2009	X-Men Origins: Wolverine	Nigerian Businessman	
2009	The One Last Time	Batman	Short film
2009	Hurricane in the Rose Garden	Eddie	
2009	The Fourth Kind	Awolowa Odusami	
2009	Darfur	Captain Jack Tobamke	
2010	Inale	Odeh	
2010	Faith and Dreams	Rebel Leader	Short film
2011	CIS: Las Gidi	Commander Mohammad	
2011	Black Gold	Dede	
2011	Man on Ground	Ade	
2011	Inside Story	Valentine	
2012	Black November	Dede	
2012	Last Flight to Abuja	Adesola	
2012	The American Failure	Detective Matheis	Short film
2013	Half of a Yellow Sun	Captain DUTSE	
2015	The Boy	The Father	Short film
2015	Dias Santana	Obi Mukwa	
2015	Daylight's End	Chris Whitlock	
2015	Chasing the Rain	Mutua	
2015	Yefon	Fon Nto	
2017	24 Hours to Live	Amahle	
2020	Riding With Sugar	Mambo	
2020	Black Beauty	Terry	
2021	The Shuroo Process	Willie	
2021	Godzilla vs. Kong	Admiral Wilcox	
2021	Marrying a Campbell	Charles Campbell	
2022	Aníkúlápó	Kabiyesi, Ilu Ojumo	
2023	Hammarskjöld	Moise Tshombe	

=== Television ===
Year	Title	Role	Notes
1987	The District Nurse	Ademola	1 episode
1988	The Bill	Kuzalo	1 episode
1989	Saracen	Bazantsi	1 episode
1991	Screen One	Jerome	1 episode
1992	Double Vision	Barman	Television film
1993	Runaway Bay	Henry Ornette	1 episode
1994	Love Hurts	Desmond Matankube	1 episode
1994	Grange Hill	Mr Manyeke	11 episodes
1995	Hidden Empire: A Son of Africa	Equiano	Television film
1996	Ellington	Tommy Knight	2 episodes
1996	Testament: The Bible in Animation	Ham	1 episode
1997	Trial & Retribution	DC Cranham	2 episodes
1997	The Adventures of Sinbad	Ali Rashid	1 episode
2000	The Desert Rose	Raad	Television film
2000	Animated Epics: Moby Dick	Queequeg	Television film
2003	Canterbury Tales	Yasouf	1 episode
2004	Human Cargo	Youssef	Miniseries; 3 episodes
2004	King Solomon's Mines	Twala	Television film
2005	The Triangle	Saunders	Miniseries, 3 episodes
2006	The Librarian: Return to King Solomon's Mines	Jomo	Television film
2006	Lost	Emeka	1 episode
2007	Cane	Tommy	1 episode
2007	Law & Order: Special Victims Unit	Chuckwei Bothame	1 episode
2008	Ben 10: Alien Force	Sir Connor	Voice, episode: "Be-Knighted"
2008	24: Redemption	Colonel Ike Dubaku	Television film
2009	24	Colonel Ike Dubaku	Recurring role, 9 episodes
2010	The Avengers: Earth's Mightiest Heroes	T'Chaka	Voice, episode: "The Man in the Ant Hill"
2010	Human Target	Andre Markus	1 episode
2011	Criminal Minds	Julio Ruiz	1 episode
2011	NCIS: Los Angeles	Abdul Habaza	2 episodes
2011	Generator Rex	Ghrun Set	Voice, episode: "Riddle of the Sphinx"
2012	Covert Affairs	Somali Pirate	1 episode
2012	Strike Back	Sulaimani	2 episodes
2014	Gotham	Richard Gladwell	1 episode
2014	State of Affairs		1 episode
2014–2016	Black Sails	Mr. Scott	Main role, 23 episodes
2015	Dominion	The Prophet	4 episodes
2016	Vixen	Eshu	Voice role; 5 episodes
2016	Roots	Samson	Miniseries, 1 episode
2017–2018	Dragons: Race to the Edge	Krogan, Drago	Recurring voice role, 16 episodes
2017–2019	Dynasty	Cesil Colby	Recurring role, 6 episodes
2017–2018	MacGyver	Solomon	2 episodes
2018	The Looming Tower	Commander Onyayango	1 episode
2018	Troy: Fall of a City	Zeus	Miniseries, 7 episodes
2019	Love, Death & Robots	Simon	Voice, episode: "Sonnie's Edge"
2019	Deep State	Joseph Damba	4 episodes
2020	Silent Witness	Adam Brookham	2 episodes
2020–2021	The Watch	Captain John Keel	2 episodes
2021	Intergalactic	Yann Harper	4 episodes
2022	Dangerous Liaisons	Majordome	6 episodes
2022	Death in Paradise	Marvin Peters	Christmas special
2023	Kizazi Moto: Generation Fire	Ogun	Voice, episode: "Mkhuzi: The Spirit Racer"
2024	FBI: Most Wanted	Bankole Udoji	1 episode
2024	Twilight of the Gods	Baldr	Voice, 4 episodes

=== Video games ===
Year	Title	Role	Notes
2006	Guild Wars Nightfall	Djinn / Additional Voices	
2007	Pirates of the Caribbean: At World's End	Gentleman Jocard	
2007	The Golden Compass	Nicholas / Samoyed	
2009	The Bourne Conspiracy	Additional Voices	
2009	Halo 3: ODST	Dr. Endesha	
2009	The Saboteur	Mingo	
2010	Halo: Reach	Jorge	
2010	Army of Two: The 40th Day	JB	
2010	Final Fantasy XIV	Additional Voices	English dub
2010	Cabela's Dangerous Hunts 2011	MBeki	
2011	Saints Row: The Third	Additional Voices	
2011	Call of Duty: Modern Warfare 3	Waraabe	
2012	Unit 13	Ringo	
2020	Beyond Blue	Andre	

== Stage ==
Year	Title	Role	Notes
1987–1988	Julius Caesar	Various	Royal Shakespeare Theatre, Stratford-upon-Avon / Barbican Theatre, London
1987–1988	The Merchant of Venice	Prince of Morocco	UK tour
1987–1988	Measure for Measure	Claudio	UK tour
1989	Othello	Othello	Theatr Clwyd, Mold
1990–1991	King Lear	Edmund	National Theatre, London
1990–1991	Richard III	Tyrrel	National Theatre, London
1993	Macbeth	Macbeth	Bridge Lane Theatre, London

== Awards and nominations ==
Year	Award	Category	Work	Result	Ref.
2004	Gemini Awards	Best Supporting Actor in a Dramatic Program or Mini-Series	Human Cargo	Nominated	
2012	Africa Movie Academy Awards	Best Film	Man on Ground	Nominated	
2012	Africa Movie Academy Awards	Best Actor in a Leading Role	Man on Ground	Nominated	
2021	South African Film and Television Awards	Best Supporting Actor – Feature Film	Riding with Sugar	Won	
