= Cinema of Nigeria =

- No. of screens: 218 (2019)
  - Per capita: 0.1 per 100,000 (2011)
- Main distributors: FilmOne Distributions 45.0% Silverbird Film Distribution 20.0% Blue Pictures 5.0%

Produced feature films (2020)
- Total: 2,599

Number of admissions (2019)
- Total: 5,432,537
  - Per capita: 0.03

Gross box office (2022)
- Total: $6.4 billion
- National films: ₦6.94 billion (US$16.65 million)

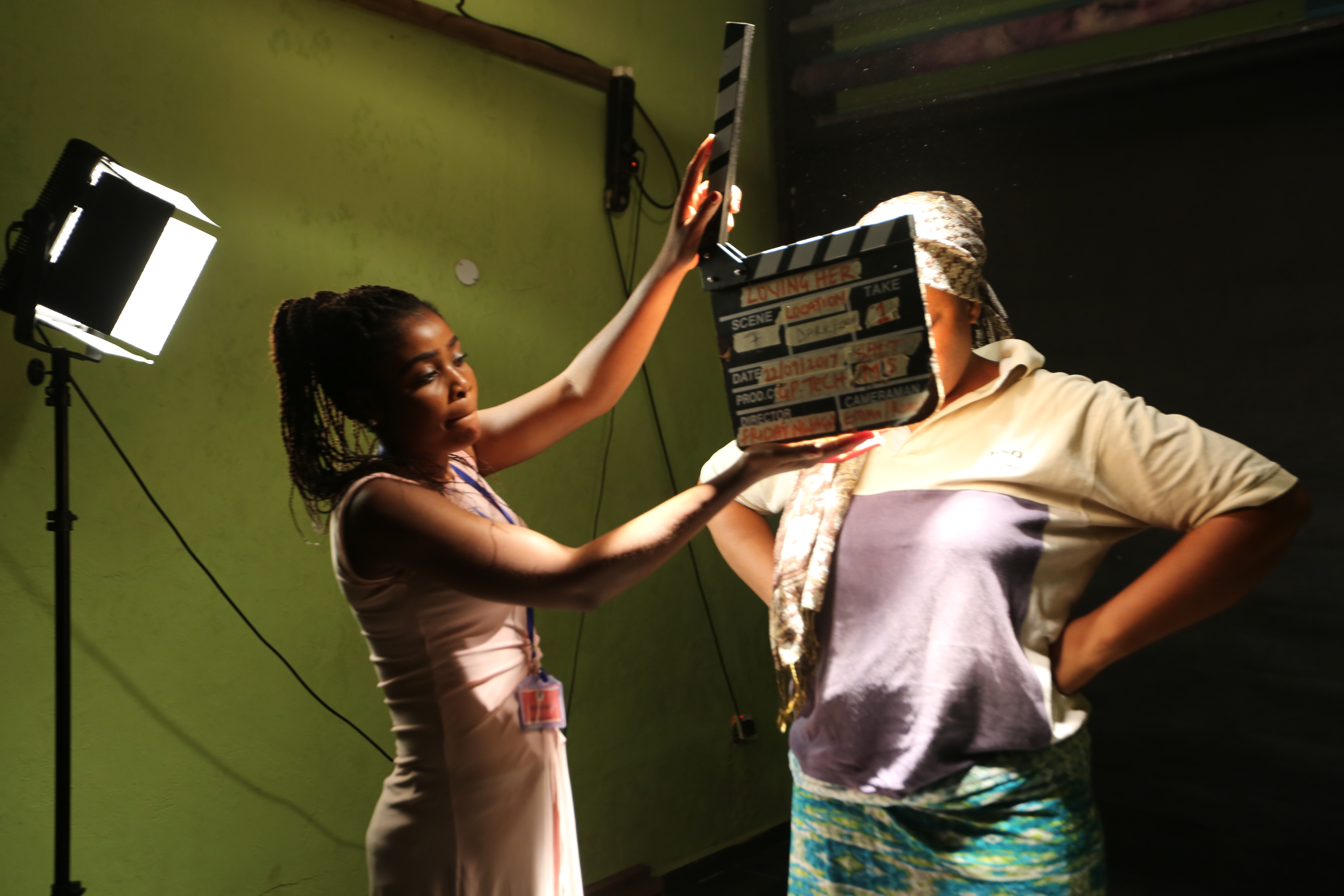
Filming in Lagos

Before Nigeria was amalgamated in 1914, the people of the Nri Kingdom were the most known for a traditional and cultural theatrical community acting performance. Village squares or market squares where their main stages are prior to most Iri Ji festivals. These acts were categorized precolonial.

The cinema of Nigeria, often called Nollywood, consists of films produced in Nigeria; its history dates back to as early as the late 19th century and into the colonial era in the early 20th century. The history and development of the Nigerian motion picture industry is generally classified in four main eras: the Colonial era, Golden Age era, video film era and the emerging New Nigerian cinema era.

Film as a medium first arrived in Nigeria in the late 19th century, in the form of peephole viewing of motion picture devices. These were soon replaced in the early 20th century with improved motion picture exhibition devices, with the first set of films screened at the Glover Memorial Hall in Lagos from 12 to 22 August 1903. The earliest feature film made in Nigeria is 1926's Palaver directed by Geoffrey Barkas, which was also the first to feature Nigerian actors in substantial roles. As of 1954, mobile cinema vans played to at least 3.5 million people in Nigeria, and films being produced by the Nigerian Film Unit were screened for free at the 44 available cinemas. The first film entirely copyrighted to the Nigerian Film Unit is Fincho (1957) by Sam Zebba; which is also the first Nigerian film to be shot in colour.

After Nigeria's independence from the United Kingdom in 1960, the cinema business rapidly expanded, with new cinema houses being established. As a result, Nigerian films in theatres increased in the late 1960s into the 1970s, especially productions from Western Nigeria, owing to former theatre practitioners such as Hubert Ogunde and Moses Olaiya transitioning into the big screen. In 1972, the Indigenization Decree was issued by Yakubu Gowon, which demands the transfer of ownership of about a total of 300 film theatres from their foreign owners to Nigerians, which resulted in more Nigerians playing active roles in the cinema and film. The oil boom of 1973 through 1978 also contributed immensely to the spontaneous boost of the cinema culture in Nigeria, as the increased purchasing power in Nigeria made a wide range of citizens have disposable income to spend on cinema going and on home television sets. After several moderately-performing films, Papa Ajasco (1984) by Wale Adenuga became the first blockbuster, grossing approximately ₦61,000 (approx. ₦21,552,673 in 2015 value) in three days. A year later, Mosebolatan (1985) by Moses Olaiya went ahead to gross ₦107,000 (approx. ₦44,180,499 in 2015 value) in five days.

After the decline of the Golden era, Nigerian film industry experienced a second major boom in the 1990s, supposedly marked by the release of the direct-to-video film Living in Bondage (1992); the industry peaked in the mid-2000s to become the second largest film industry in the world in terms of the number of annual film productions, placing it ahead of the United States and behind only India. It started dominating screens across the African continent, an, by extension the Caribbean and the wider diaspora, with the movies significantly influencing cultures and the film actors becoming household names across the continent. The boom also led to backlash against Nigerian films in several countries, bordering on theories such as the "Nigerialization of Africa".

Since the mid-2000s, during the decline of the video-film era, the Nigerian cinema has undergone some restructuring to promote quality in output and professionalism in the industry, with The Figurine (2009) widely regarded as marking the major turnaround of contemporary Nigerian cinema. There has since been a resurgence in cinema establishments, and a steady return of the cinema culture in Nigeria. As of 2013, Nigerian cinema is rated as the third most valuable film industry in the world based on its worth and revenues generated. with the movies significantly influencing cultures.

== History ==
The history of cinema in Nigeria dates back as early as the history of film itself; notably in the late 19th century, with the use of peephole viewing of motion picture devices. These were soon replaced in early 20th century with improved motion picture exhibition devices; the first set of films shown in Nigerian theatres were Western films, with the first film screened at Glover Memorial Hall in Lagos from 12 to 22 August 1903. In that year, Herbert Macaulay had invited the Balboa and Company, Spain to organize an exhibition tour of silent films in Nigeria.

Although Mr. Balboa later closed his exhibition in Lagos, while he continued showing films in other West African countries, the success of his exhibition led a European merchant, Stanley Jones, to begin showing films in the same Glover Memorial Hall, starting from November 1903. This brought about the influx of more European film exhibitors to Nigeria. The first film hit in this early period came on 3 August 1904, when the documentary on the visit of the Alake of Egba to England was screened.

=== Colonial era (late 19th century - early 1960s) ===
Colonial filmmakers started producing films for local audiences within Nigeria since the 1920s, mostly employing the mobile cinema as a means of exhibition; the earliest feature film made in Nigeria is 1926's Palaver produced by Geoffrey Barkas. The film was also the first film ever to feature Nigerian actors in a speaking role. Nigerian film actors featured in Palaver include Dawiya and Yilkuba. The film was shot amongst the Sura and Angas people of the present day Bauchi and Plateau States in Northern Nigeria, and narrates the rivalry between a British District Officer and a tin miner, which leads to a war. Also in this era there were several films set in Nigeria, one of the most notable being 1935's Sanders of the River by Zoltán Korda, featuring Nigerian actor Orlando Martins. Martins was also featured in other notable films, including The Man from Morocco (1945), Men of Two Worlds (1946) and so on, and this established Martins as one of the recognized Nigerian actors of his time. As of 1921, there were four other halls showing films twice a week in Lagos Mainland and one hall each in Ebute Metta and Oshodi. By this time, cinema had become popular in Lagos, with crowds of young and old people usually waiting at the doors of theatre halls. Religion also aided in the expansion of cinema culture as the Christian missionaries used cinemas for religious propaganda.

As cinemas became a common feature of the social life in the then emerging city of Lagos, the late 1930s through 1940s marked the beginning of the establishment of big commercial cinema houses with branches in strategic parts of the country. One of the earliest cinema operators in Lagos was the "West African Pictures Company" owned by Mr. S. Khalil, a member of the Syrian community in Lagos. He established the Rex Cinema in Ebute Metta, Regal Cinema, and Royal Cinema. Other popular cinema chains include: Capitol Cinema, Casino Cinema, Kings Cinema, Central Cinema, Rialto Cinema, Corona Cinema, Odeon Cinema, Road House Cinema, Ikeja Arms Cinema, and Glover Hall. In 1937, the colonial government set up a Board of Censorship to handle matters relating to the establishment and operations of cinema houses in the colony. Nigerian content in films made and shown in Nigerian cinemas during this period was, however, virtually non-existent as the production and distribution were controlled by foreigners. Motion picture entertainment was, as a result, complemented by the Yoruba travel theatre groups, which emerged in the 1930s through 1940s; One of the most prominent were the Agbegijo and Alarinjo theatre groups, which featured theatre actors such as Duro Ladipo, Ishola Ogunmola, Lere Paimo, Oyin Adejobi, amongst others.

In 1949 through 1950, the state of affairs changed a bit, with more Nigerian contents being exhibited in cinemas; with a purported drive to "Africanize" film production, the Nigerian Film Unit was established in order to decentralize colonial film production. The Colonial Film Unit, throughout the decade, exhibited health and educational films to local audiences through its mobile cinema vans. It also produced newsreels and short documentaries, depicting celebrations and colonial achievements to domestic and overseas audiences.

=== Golden Age (late 1950s - late 1980s) ===
After Nigeria's independence from Britain in 1960, the cinema business rapidly expanded, with new cinema houses being established. However, there came a significant influx of American, Indian, Chinese, and Japanese films; posters of films from these countries were all over theatre halls, and actors from these industries became very popular in Nigeria. Towards the late 1960s and into the 1970s, Nigerian productions in movie houses increased gradually, especially productions from Western Nigeria, owing to former theatre practitioners such as Hubert Ogunde, Ola Balogun, Moses Olaiya, Jab Adu, Isola Ogunsola, Ladi Ladebo, Sanya Dosumu, and Sadiq Balewa, amongst others, transitioning into the big screen. The first fully commercial Nigerian films, shot on celluloid, were also made by these filmmakers in the 1960s.

In 1972, concerned about the influx of foreign culture into Nigeria, the Indigenization Decree was issued by the then head of state, Yakubu Gowon; which demands the transfer of ownership of about a total of 300 film theatres in the country from their foreign owners to Nigerians. Also, more Nigerians started playing active roles in cinema establishments as a result of this policy. This transfer also resulted in the emergence of Nigerian playwrights, screenwriters, and film producers; popular literature and theatre works were adapted into motion pictures. The oil boom of 1973 through 1978 contributed immensely to the spontaneous boost of the cinema culture in Nigeria. The presence of foreign investments led to the erection of several cinema complexes. In 1976, the 5000-capacity National Arts Theatre, Iganmu was constructed in Lagos. The theatre was incorporated with two cinemas, each having a capacity of over 700 people. At this time cinema business had become a notable employer of many people and also served as an important social function, as Nigerians visited cinemas for relaxation and entertainment purposes. The increased purchasing power in Nigeria also made a wide range of citizens to have disposable income to spend on cinema-going and on home television sets.

Television broadcasting in Nigeria began in the 1960s and received much government support in its early years. By the mid-1980s every state had its own broadcasting station. Law limited foreign content on television, so producers in Lagos began televising local popular theatre productions. Many of these were circulated on video as well, and a small-scale informal video movie trade developed. As of late 1980s, the cinema culture was beginning to face a major decline, and most Nigerian film producers had transitioned to television productions. The gradual decline of the Golden era of Nigerian cinema has been attributed to several factors, including the reduction in the value of Naira, lack of finance and marketing support, lack of standard film studios and production equipment, frequent Government structural adjustment programmes due to military dictatorships, as well as inexperience on the part of practitioners. The drastic decline in cinema culture resulted in some of the existing cinema houses being acquired by religious bodies and turned to churches; others were simply just closed down. In the early 1990s, only a few of the once vibrant cinema houses were still in operation, and all had collapsed before 1999.

=== Piracy boom (late 1980s - mid 2010s) ===
The emergence of the video film market in Nigeria is traced back to the 1980s when television productions thrived. Jimi Odumosu's Evil Encounter, a 1983 horror film released directly on television, was the first production to be a pointer to how lucrative making film directly on video could be. The film was extensively promoted before being aired on television, and as a result, had streets flooded in the following morning with video copies of the recorded broadcast. It was reported that the film became an instant hit at Alaba market, a commercial district which later became the hub of video distribution in this period and also eventually became the hub of piracy in Nigeria. Since Evil Encounter, it became common, especially in Southern Nigerian cities, to see video copies of recorded television programmes traded on the streets.

This method was adopted and built on by producers and distributors at Alaba Market to reinvent the film industry, since the Nigerian cinema culture was facing a major decline. The first film produced on video in Nigeria was 1988's Soso Meji, produced by Ade Ajiboye. The film was also screened at the few available theatres at the time. Subsequently, Alade Aromire produced Ekun (1989) on video, which was screened at the National Theatre, Iganmu. However, the boom experienced in this era is generally believed to have been kickstarted by Kenneth Nnebue's Living in Bondage (1992). Nnebue had an excess number of imported video cassettes which he then used to shoot his first film on a Video camera. Although Living in Bondage is often touted in the media as the "first commercial video film", several historians have argued that the video film industry was already booming before Living in Bondage.

As of 2004, at least four to five films were produced every day in Nigeria. Nigerian movies had also already dominated television screens across the African continent and by extension, the diaspora. The film actors also became household names across the continent, and the movies significantly influenced cultures in many African nations; from ways of dressing to speech and usage of Nigerian slangs. This was attributed to the fact that Nigerian films told "relatable" stories, which made foreign films to "gather dust" on the shelves of video stores, even though they cost much less.

According to the Filmmakers Cooperative of Nigeria, every film in Nigeria had a potential audience of 15 million people in Nigeria and about 5 million outside Nigeria. In no time, the industry became the third largest producer of films in the world. However, this didn't translate to an overtly commercial film industry when compared to other major film hubs across the world; the worth of the industry was approximated at just about US$250 million, since most of the films produced were cheaply made. The film industry regardless became a major employer in Nigeria. As of 2007, with a total number of 6,841 registered video parlours and an estimated 500,000 unregistered ones, the estimated revenue generated by sales and rentals of movies in Lagos State alone was estimated to be ₦804 million (US$5 million) per week, which adds up to an estimated ₦33.5 billion (US$209 million) revenue for Lagos State per annum. Approximately 700,000 discs were sold in Alaba market per day, with the total sales revenue generated by the film industry in Nigeria estimated at ₦522 billion (US$3 billion) per annum, with broadcast content valued at ₦250 billion (US$1.6 billion).

At the peak of the video era at around 2008, the industry had become the second largest producer of films, releasing approximately 200 video films monthly. However at this point, the Nigerian film industry had practically degenerated into a "visionless" industry, with the invasion of several people who did not know a thing about filmmaking, and piracy was at its peak. Dealing with the menace of piracy, amongst other problems, became a hard nut to crack; as a result of this, most investors of the "Alaba cartel", who control almost 90 percent stakes in the video industry, began to channel their money into other business ventures instead. The decline of the home video era has been attributed to several factors, such as the refusal of the Government to provide support and funding, the lack of a formal and effective indigenous film distribution infrastructure and the increase in the cost of production in Nigeria.

=== New Nigerian Cinema (mid 2000s - present) ===
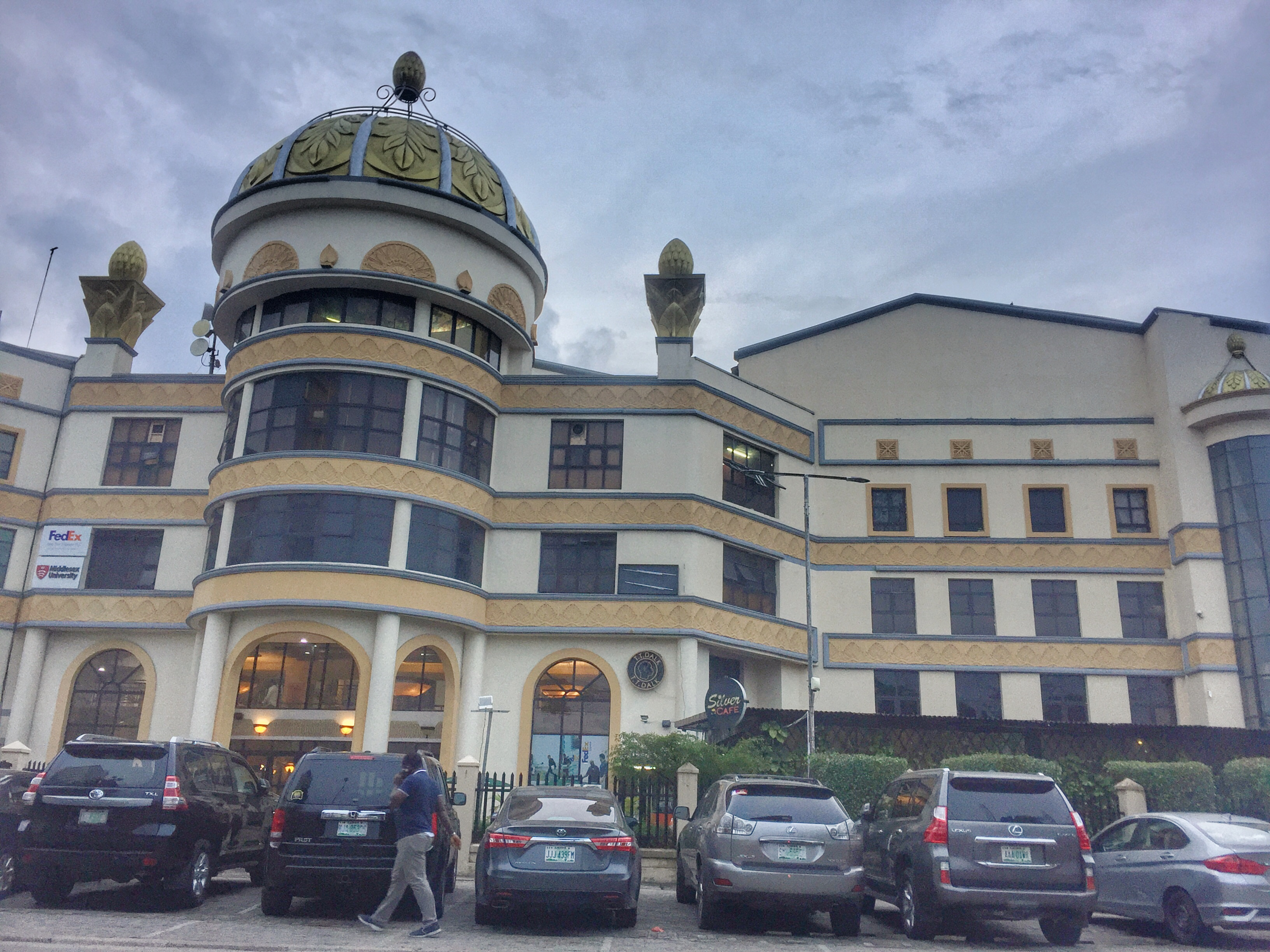
Silverbird Galleria Cinemas, in Lagos

This is an emerging phase in Nigerian cinema, in which there became a major shift in the method of film production, from the video format, back to the cinema method, which constituted the films produced in the Golden era. A few years into the 21st century, Nigeria began to experience the growth of cinemas, which was initially structured for the middle and upper classes. The Silverbird Group is the first company to launch a series of modern cinema houses across major cities in Nigeria, mostly situated in affluent areas and districts. It launched its cinema chains in 2004, starting with the Silverbird Galleria in Victoria Island, Lagos. The Silverbird Galleria is a large shopping mall, with an upscale cinema facility and various outlets where mercantile activities take place. This provides more reasons to visit the place beyond just watching films, but more of a social activity and a modified sort of entertainment beyond film watching. This trend has given another probable explanation as to the demise of the Nigerian cinema culture in the 1980s, which might have been as a result of the unfashionable appearance of most cinemas of the Golden era.

Silverbird cinemas upon establishment started screening Nigerian films with high production quality, as a result discouraging poor film production. The first New wave film to be shown at a cinema was the Yoruba-language film Irapada (2006) by Kunle Afolayan, which was screened at the Silverbird Galleria in Lagos. The Silverbird experiment became very successful, and as a result, the group launched a few more cinema branches in Lagos and other cities in the country. Not long after the establishment of Silverbird cinemas, Genesis Deluxe Cinemas and Ozone Cinemas were also launched creating a competition in the cinema business. Much later, in the 2010s, Filmhouse Cinemas also came into the picture, leading to the availability of more cinemas in the country, especially outside the affluent neighbourhoods.

Several grants have been launched by the Nigerian Government, in order to support quality content in Nigerian films. In 2006, "Project Nollywood" was launched by the Nigerian Government, in conjunction with Ecobank. The project provided ₦100 million (US$781,000) to Nigerian filmmakers to produce high quality films and to fund a multimillion Naira distribution network across the country during this period. In 2010, the administration of President Goodluck Jonathan launched a ₦30 billion (US$200 million) "Creative and Entertainment Industry" Intervention Fund, financed by Bank of Industry (BOI), in conjunction with Nigerian Export and Import (NEXIM) Bank. This grant, although dubbed as a spin-off of "Project Nollywood", was for the entire Nigerian Creative Arts and Entertainment sector. The vision of the grant for the film industry however is to help more Nigerian filmmakers in training, funding, and also help in creating necessary infrastructure for the industry. In 2013, a smaller new grant of ₦3 billion (US$20 million) was awarded once again solely for Nollywood, and specifically for the production of high quality films, and to sponsor filmmakers for formal training in film schools. Also in 2015, Bank of Industry launched another "NollyFund" program for the purpose of giving financial support in form of loans to film producers.

The popular 2009 thriller film The Figurine is generally considered the game changer, which heightened the media attention towards the "New Nigerian Cinema" revolution. The film was a critical and commercial success in Nigeria, and it was also screened in international film festivals The 2010 film Ijé by Chineze Anyaene, overtook The Figurine to become the highest grossing Nigerian film; a record it held for four years, until it was overtaken in 2014 by Half of a Yellow Sun (2013). By 2016, this record was held by The Wedding Party, a film by Kemi Adetiba.

By the end of 2013, the film industry reportedly hit a record breaking revenue of ₦1.72 trillion (US$11 billion). As of 2014, the industry was worth ₦853.9 billion (US$5.1 billion) making it the third most valuable film industry in the world, behind the United States and India. It contributed about 1.4% to Nigeria's economy; this was attributed to the increase in the number of quality films produced and more formal distribution methods.

Unlike the home video era, films in the new wave are generally of much improved quality, with considerably bigger budgets; averaging between ₦40 million (US$250,000) and ₦120 million ($750,000). These films' production periods take months and even span into years, a far cry from the films in video format which are usually shot in a matter of days or weeks. Other notable improvements in the New Nollywood include: more subtle performances from actors; different from the overt melodrama which constituted the video era, more practical, more logical and generally better stories. Themes explored in these films are often characterized by consciously cosmopolitan themes, as most of the filmmakers are relatively young. A proper copyright and distribution system still remains one of the major challenges in the New Nigerian Cinema.

In the 2023 Sundance Film Festival, the Nigerian film Mami Wata, directed by C.J. Obasi won the Special Jury Award for Cinematography.

The animated short film "Morèmi" by Lagosian Shof Coker was included in the anthology "Kizazi Moto: Generation Fire" by Disney+ in 2023. "Morèmi" follows the ghost boy Luo, who is trapped in the realm of the gods and haunted by giants. When he is rescued by a scientist from future Nigeria, Luo connects with his lost memories and learns of the sacrifice once made to save his people.

"Battle on Buka Street" from 2022 takes a humorous yet dramatic approach to the rivalry between two not-so-young sisters who vie for the distinction of being the best outdoor chef and hawker in their (fictional) street when it comes to culinary delights. The comedy has since surpassed Wedding Party I and II, is (as of August 2023) the highest-grossing Nigerian film of all time, and has received critical acclaim. This is the first Nigerian non-arthouse film to screen in US box offices. According to Film One Entertainment, the lead film studio, "Battle" is the first ever film of its kind in the US. Its controlled release in 11 Regal theatres with reduced screenings resulted in sold-out screenings nationwide. Film One adds that it is the first ever indigenous Nollywood release in the United States. "Buka" are (in Yoruba and Hausa) gastronomic street vendors.

== Influx of Ghanaian actors ==
Around year 2006 through 2007, Nigerian filmmaker Frank Rajah Arase signed a contract with a Ghanaian production company, Venus Films, which involved helping to introduce Ghanaian actors into mainstream Nollywood. This collaboration eventually led to extreme popularity of certain Ghanaian actors, such as Van Vicker, Jackie Appiah, Majid Michel, Yvonne Nelson, John Dumelo, Nadia Buari and Yvonne Okoro, arguably as much as their Nigerian counterparts. Furthermore, over the years; due to the high cost of film production in Nigeria, Nigerian filmmakers have been forced to make films outside Lagos in order to cut costs, mirroring the exodus of filmmaking in Hollywood from Los Angeles to cities like Toronto and Albuquerque, a process known as "Runaway production". Several other producers as a result started shooting in cities like Accra, Ghana, channeling the savings into investing in better equipment, many of them trying to get their films onto the big screen.

In 2013, Nigerian Entertainment Today revealed that Ghanaian actors had 60 percent of the total market share in the year. A survey carried out by the Newspaper showed that out of 184 films featured on Nollytuned.com, a Nigerian streaming website, between April and August 2013, Ghanaian actors played lead roles in at least 93 of them. It was also reported that there are high demands for Ghanaian acts in video stores. At the first edition of Africa Magic Viewers' Choice Awards (AMVCA) in 2013, Ghana's Jackie Appiah was awarded Best Actress in a Lead Role. Same year, Appiah again was awarded 'Best Actress' at the Nollywood and African Film Critics Awards (NAFCA). Ghanaian actors like Majid Michel have also been awarded at several Nollywood award ceremonies.

Sam Onanuga, a Nigerian script writer blames the trend on the reluctance of the established Nigerian acts to partake in more films on Video. With the emergence of New Nigerian Cinema, more Nigerian acts wanted roles on the big screen in order to boost their resume, refusing to star in video films; Ghanaian actors as a result took advantage of this, as they become more prominent on Nigerian video films which were already taking a down turn at this time, but still very popular.

This development sparked media attention; mostly concerns that Ghanaians were taking over jobs meant for Nigerians. While some industry stakeholders such as Bob Manuel were unwelcoming towards the development, others like Mercy Aigbe, Belinda Effah, and Yvonne Jegede saw it as a welcome development; noting that the industry is big enough for everyone, and that other major film hubs across the world also have presence of other nationalities. Theresa Edem commented: "A united Africa sells any day, anytime. It's been a great partnership so far. They've added colour to Nollywood and they've brought about healthy competition. Emem Isong, a Nigerian producer comments: "It fosters unity and integration and that's not a bad thing".

Some Ghanaian media on the other hand described the trend as "Brain drain" from Ghana. However, Ghanaian director Frank Fiifi Gharbin, expressed satisfaction with the development, saying: "there shouldn't be much fuss about Ghanaian actors in Nollywood. For us it is a good development. It shows that our actors are beginning to gain prominence and are being accepted worldwide".

== Influence ==
The increased collaboration between Nigeria and Ghana from the mid-2000s led to the resurgence of Ghana's film industry. However, many Ghanaian productions are copyrighted to Nollywood and distributed by Nigerian marketers due to Nigeria's bigger market. Nigerian filmmakers usually feature Ghanaian actors in Nigerian movies as well and that has led to the popularity of Ghanaian actors almost like their Nigerian counterparts. Nigerian actors have also starred in some Ghanaian productions, in order for the film to capture wider audience. Van Vicker, a popular Ghanaian actor, has starred in many Nigerian movies. As a result of these collaborations, Western viewers often confuse Ghanaian movies with Nigerian films and count their sales as one; however, they are two independent industries that sometimes share the colloquial "Nollywood".

== Popularity and appeal ==
In 2009, Unesco rated Nollywood as the second-biggest film industry in the world after Indian cinema in terms of output.

=== Africa ===
The overwhelming popularity of Nollywood productions has also led to backlash against Nigerian films in several countries. For instance, there have been reported cases of shops selling Nigerian films being raided by the police in Ghana; according to them, "they are struggling not to be colonized by Nigerian movies". Several other governments have also introduced protectionist measures, some of which include introducing spurious taxes for production houses who want to shoot films in their countries. In July 2010, Ghana started demanding US$1,000 from visiting Nigerian actors and US$5,000 from producers and directors. The Democratic Republic of Congo had also tried to ban Nigerian films. Jean Rouch, a champion of indigenous art in Niger, compared Nollywood to AIDS. He stated that there seems to be a "Nigerianization" of Africa, worrying that the whole continent has come to "snap its fingers the Nigerian way".

=== Europe ===
The Nigerian film industry has a strong following in the African diaspora community in Europe, especially in the United Kingdom.

== Organizations and events ==
=== Organizations ===
- Actors Guild of Nigeria (AGN): is a union, which regulates and represents the affairs of film actors in Nigeria and abroad. It is headed by an elected president.
- Association of Movie Producers (AMP)
- Creative Designers Guild of Nigeria (CDGN)
- Directors Guild of Nigeria (DGN)
- Edo Artistes Association of Nigeria (EAAN)
- Nigerian Film Corporation
- Screenwriters Guild of Nigeria

=== Events ===
- Africa International Film Festival (AFRIFF)
- Africa Magic Viewers' Choice Awards
- Cinema Movie's Academy Awards (CIMA): is an award event in Nigeria.
- Africa Movie Academy Awards (AMAA): is an award event in Nigeria, which rewards excellent filmmaking in the African film industry. It was created in 2005 and has been considered to be the most prestigious award in Nollywood and on the African continent. It is also the most hungered after award and event in African movie world.
- Best of Nollywood Awards
- Nollywood Movies Awards

== See also ==
- Nollywood
- List of Nigerian films
- List of highest-grossing Nigerian films
- List of Nigerian actors
- List of Nigerian film producers
- Media in Nigeria
- Cinema of Africa
- Cinema of Egypt
- List of Nigerian submissions for the Academy Award for Best International Feature Film
