= The Figurine =

2009 film by Kunle Afolayan

The Figurine: Araromire
- Theatrical release poster
- Directed by: Kunle Afolayan
- Written by: Kemi Adesoye
- Produced by: Golden Effects
- Starring: Ramsey Nouah; Omoni Oboli; Kunle Afolayan; Funlola Aofiyebi-Raimi; Tosin Sido
- Narrated by: Lagbaja
- Cinematography: Yinka Edward
- Edited by: Kayode Adeleke; Steve Sodiya
- Music by: Wale Waves
- Production companies: Golden Effects Studios; Jungle FilmWorks
- Distributed by: Golden Effects Pictures
- Release dates: 6 February 2009 (IFFR); 2 October 2009 (Nigeria)
- Running time: 122 minutes
- Country: Nigeria
- Languages: English; Yoruba
- Budget: ₦50- 70 million
- Box office: ₦30,000,000 (domestic gross)

The Figurine: Araromire is a 2009 Nigerian supernatural suspense thriller film written by Kemi Adesoye, produced and directed by Kunle Afolayan, who also stars in the film as one of the main protagonists. It also stars Ramsey Nouah and Omoni Oboli.

The movie narrates the story of two friends who find a mystical sculpture in an abandoned shrine in the forest while serving at a National Youth Service Corps camp, and one of them decides to take the artwork home. Unknown to them, the sculpture is from the goddess 'Araromire' which bestows seven years of good luck on anyone who encounters it, and after the seven years have expired, seven years of bad luck follow. The lives of the two friends begin to change for the better, as they become successful and wealthy businessmen. However, after seven years, things start to change for the worse.

The idea for a thriller film was conceived by Kunle Afolayan and scriptwriter Giovanni Durojaiye (also known as Jovi Babs) and was originally titled Shrine. The script took nine months to finalize and the development stage took five years. The film was shot in Lagos and Osun States over three months and received sponsorship from companies such as MicCom Golf Resort, GSK, Omatek Computers, MTN, IRS Airlines, and Cinekraft. It also had media partners like HiTV and others. There were no stuntmen on the ground, so most of the stunts were performed by Kunle Afolayan on set.

The film was released at the 2009 Rotterdam International Film Festival and met with widespread critical acclaim. It received ten nominations and won five awards at the 6th Africa Movie Academy Awards, including the awards for Best Picture, Heart of Africa (since renamed Best Nigerian Film), Achievement in Cinematography and Achievement in Visual Effects.

On 31 July 2014, Auteuring Nollywood: Critical Perspectives on The Figurine, a compilation of scholarly analysis of the film, was published to positive reviews. The Figurine has also been used as a subject of educational studies in the Arts department of some higher institutions.

== Plot ==
In the year 1908, a folktale originated about the goddess Araromire who asked a priest to invoke her spirit into a figurine carved out of the bark of a cursed tree. When villagers of Araromire touched the figurine, Araromire granted them good fortune for seven years. After that, their blessings reversed and their lives took a turn for the worse. When the priest is found dead, the villagers become infuriated and burn down the Araromire shrine, bringing an apparent end to the evil of Araromire.

The story jumps to 2001, Lagos. Femi is about to go for his NYSC and has been posted to Araromire. His father is very ill with cancer.

Sola, on the other hand, has no NYSC, without which he can't secure a job following an interview. He subsequently visits the Dean of his faculty to get his clearance for NYSC. Upon learning that Sola has been posted to Araromire, the Dean pulls out a book on the folk tale of Araromire which he starts to read to Sola. Disinterested, the young man departs the dean's office and doesn't hear the rest of the tale recounting the disaster which follows the seven years of good fortune.

Mona, a close friend of Femi, has also been posted to Araromire and the two travel together to their destination. During the bus ride Femi brings out a ring that he clenches while gazing at Mona as she sleeps, visibly enamored with her.

Sola finally arrives at the NYSC orientation camp when the camp is almost over. Out on an endurance trek Femi becomes is out of breath and stops in the woods to use his inhaler, while Sola waits for him. Hearing a strange sound, the two men trace it to a peculiar object atop a tree. Rain starts to fall and they both find shelter in a mud house. Sola uses his lighter and starts to explore the place. When Femi steps out of the house to get fresh air, Sola finds a figurine enclosed in a dusty wooden cradle.

On the last day of Parade, Mona informs Femi that she accepted Sola's marriage proposal and that she's carrying his baby. Jealous, Femi tries unsuccessfully to discourage Sola from getting married. Sola dismisses Femi's entreaties, and brings out the figurine he found in the mud house, dropping it on Femi's lap. Femi returns home to find his father healthy and fully recovered. His good fortune continues when he is selected by his employer to go for a special training within just six months of his appointment. Meanwhile, Sola gets a job as well and marries Mona.

Seven years later, Femi returns from abroad and attends a reunion arranged at Sola's home, where he still keeps the Araromire figure. Mona, who is pregnant again, introduces Femi to Linda, a fashion designer. Throughout the party, Femi ignores her and keeps staring at Mona whom he is visibly still in love with. Lara, Femi's younger sister, now lives with Sola and Mona, as Mona is helping her with her thesis. Smoking at the party, it's evident that Femi's asthma has been miraculously cured.

Learning about the Araromire legend, Mona becomes suspicious and concerned about the source of Sola's sudden wealth. She concludes that the figurine may also be the reason why her marriage with Sola has been so flawless. She asks Lara to throw the figurine away but it mysteriously finds its way back into the house. When she decides to throw it into the lagoon herself, she suffers a miscarriage on her way over to the lagoon. Matters continue to worsen for everyone. While dancing at the club with Linda, Femi gets his first asthma attack in years. Sola also starts having an affair with Ngozi after years of faithfulness to Mona. Femi discovers his father dead in his crafts workshop. Both Femi and Sola eventually lose their jobs. Femi suggests returning the figurine to the shrine and though Sola doesn't believe it is responsible for all the misfortune, he agrees. Junior, Sola's first son, dies by falling off from the building. After burning the figurine following the tragedy, it reappears once again, prompting Sola and Femi to finally return the figurine.

Mona, now in a depression, kicks Lara out of the house believing she is responsible for Junior's death. While Lara struggles with Linda who is throwing her belongings out, a box opens and multiple figurines, similar to the one in Sola's study, spill out. Lara confesses she was responsible for replacing the figurine each time it was discarded and reveals that she was doing so at the request of her brother, Femi. Meantime, Femi and Sola arrive at the Araromire Shrine to return the figurine; rain starts to fall and Femi is nowhere to be found. While Sola is busy looking for him, Femi kills Sola by hitting him with a log. Femi returns to Lagos and he is confronted by Linda, whom Lara has already confessed to. Femi confesses and reveals how Araromire's apparent good and bad fortune was all orchestrated by him in order to kill Sola and claim Mona for himself. He claims the loss of their jobs, his father's death and the return of his asthma as just coincidence. Femi then kills Linda and dumps her body in the lagoon. On his way back, he has an asthma attack and commands Lara to bring him his inhaler, but she refuses; instead, she calls the Rapid Response Squad to report her brother's killings. Femi struggles to get upstairs. He reaches out to Mona's body, removes Sola's ring from her finger and replaces it with his ring. The Rapid Response Squad arrives and declares Femi dead.

Linda, Femi and Mona are later seen alive and the movie ends with the caption 'What do you believe'?

== Cast ==
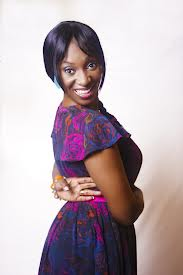
Aofiyebi has been described as the one who "lit up the screen" in The Figurine

- Ramsey Nouah as Femi, an unpredictable nerd who falls in love with Mona, this feeling of love overtakes him until he becomes irrational and violent. He orchestrates a plan to win his love back by making the 'Araromire myth' a reality. Nouah has expressed love for his role in this film and the film as whole on several occasions. He stated that the movie had everything Nollywood lacked in storytelling at the time and he was glad the movie was coming out of Nollywood. He stated in an interview that The Figurine was the only movie he has acted that he is willing to keep to show his kids when they are grown.
- Omoni Oboli as Mona, a close friend to Femi who is oblivious of the fact that Femi is desperately in love with her as she's in love with Sola, who is also Femi's close friend, however Sola knows that Femi is interested in Mona. Mona eventually marries Sola after getting pregnant for him. Oboli stated that she likes Kunle Afolayan as a director and she wishes to learn a lot from him as she's hoping to become a director herself. She also stated that it was stressful on set as she was shooting with her real son (Tobe Oboli), so she had to take care of her son and shield him from likes of Kunle and Ramsey who would want to talk about "adult stuff" on set. According to her, the scene where she was dragged down the stairs was the most difficult as it was shot over and over and she got a lot of bruises as a result.
- Kunle Afolayan as Sola, an unserious Casanova who finds a mystical Araromire while serving as a youth corps and takes it home. Despite his wayward ways and terrible grades, he gets a job, marries Mona, gets rich and raises a wonderful family until things start to turn around after seven years. Afolayan, who was also the director of the film expressed that it is very stressful to act in one's film. Art Director Pat Nebo stated "Kunle showed heavy maturity when it mattered most; cos he had to act, then go back to direct".
- Funlola Aofiyebi as Linda, an outgoing fashion designer who is a little desperate to get married because of her age. She ends up with Femi who is still in love with Mona.
- Tosin Sido as Lara, Femi's younger sister who he uses to carry out his plans. He gives her many Figurines crafted by their father who is a Sculptor to scare Sola and Mona into breaking up. This is Tosin Sido's first film role. She was one of the actresses auditioned to play Femi's younger sister and she got the role.
- David J. Oserwe as Femi's father, a sculptor. He helps Femi to make the 'fake' figurines; believing he is selling them to western museums.
- Kate Adepegba as Ngozi, one of the Older Ladies Sola used to date; he still cheats on Mona with her after marriage.
- Muraina Oyelami as Sola's Dean in school
- Wale Adebayo as Camp Commandant
- Ombo Gogo Ombo as Araromire Priest

The narration at the beginning of the movie was done by the highlife singer Lagbaja. Pat Nebo, the art director, played the marriage registrar at Sola and Mona's wedding ceremony. Yomi Fash Lanso played Femi's doctor in the movie. Jide Kosoko played an antagonistic chairman and featured in two scenes in the film. The make-up artist on set, Lola Maja also played the doctor at the scene where Junior was taken to the hospital. She was also the Doctor that came to give Mona her medication, making her feature in a total of two scenes.

== Production ==
=== Development ===
The Figurine's funding came up when many questions were asked about Nollywood, about the level of mediocrity and lack of good structure in the industry. Before The Figurine, only few movies were fit to be shown in theatres as Nollywood was a home video-dominated Industry. Kunle Afolayan threw up a challenge to do something different which would be acceptable globally. The original idea for a thriller movie came long ago from Kunle Afolayan himself and Jovi Babs and it was to be titled Shrine. In 2006, Kunle Afolayan met a scriptwriter, Kemi Adesoye, and she was signed to write the script for the movie. A first draft script written by Kunle Afolayan was given to her. After going through the script, she said to the director "It's funny, not a thriller". The script had to be scrapped and another four different versions of a thriller movie were later written with the title Shrine. Care had to be taken when writing the script so as not insult people's beliefs; according to the Art Director, Pat Nebo, "living in Nigeria is a war between our culture and our love for independence in different ways". The script for the movie took nine months to be finalized and the development stage took five years. Within these periods, Kunle Afolayan shot a movie titled 'Irapada'; another spiritual-themed thriller which he said was just an "experiment". When he saw the success of Irapada, he then revisited The Figurine.

According to Kunle, all his life savings were put into the movie. Meanwhile, the movie got sponsorship from a number of brands and corporate organizations which include MicCom Golf Resort, GSK, Omatek Computers and so on. After completion of the film however, other companies came on board like MTN, IRS Airlines, Cinekraft and Media partners like HiTV and many others.

=== Design of Araromire sculpture ===
Props has often been given for the brilliant depiction of Araromire sculpture.

In designing the sculpture of the figurine 'Araromire', the sculptor stated that, as he understood the film, the sculpture should have a connection with African history and at the same time have expression of humanity like breasts (milk). A jewel is also held by the figurine which indicates some kind of magical powers. And above all, the figure is naked, because life itself is naked.

=== Filming ===
The film was shot in Lagos and Ada, Osun State for three months. The tourist attraction in Osun was shown in the movie by filming at the water falls, hills and the forests. MicCom Golf and Hotel Resort provided free accommodation for the cast and crew while they shot in Osun State, some scenes in the film were shot at the resort as well. The equipment used for the movie was gotten from Jungle Film Works; the only place in Nigeria at the time to get all the equipment needed for big budget movies. Jungle film Works eventually came on board as associate producers for the film.

There were no professional stunt performers on ground, so most of the stunts were performed by Kunle Afolayan, including a scene where the Priest was floating on the surface of the River; Kunle Afolayan was under the water lifting Ombo up. Other stunts were also performed by Mayowa Adebayo.

For the two Shrine scenes where Rain was needed, the crew were in a Village in Osun state so they had to contact the fire fighters from the city to help out. On the first day of shooting, there was not enough pressure for the water to create the needed effect; the water eventually got finished and the shoot was cancelled for that day and was shot all over again the next day.

There was a lot of makeup and special effects used on Ombo (the Priest); He is not very old, so apart from body paintings, skin bags had to be applied on his face, long grey hairs had to be attached to his eyebrows to make him look weird and fake contacts were added to his eyes as well.

The Lagoon house where Mona and Sola live in The Figurine is one of the most notable sets of the film

According to the script, the house in which Sola and Mona live is supposed to be a Lagoon House. It took three weeks; Kunle and the Location Manager, Biodun Apantaku visited all Houses in Lagos Island, but no one would release his house for a film shoot. The set later had to be created: the Set Designer had to erect a structure and create the necessary parts of the house (Sitting room, Kitchen and bedroom). However, sets for a couple of scenes were also created; for example, the mud house where the figurine was found was also erected.

On a day of shooting, the crew were trying to move all the equipment to the Island by boat, including the generator: The boat capsized and shooting was shut down for over a week. When they resumed, smaller generators were gotten. As a result of the heavy lights they were using; One of the generators developed faults and everything that was brought blew up: the battery, the charger got burnt and the Shoot had to be cancelled for days again.

=== Music and soundtrack ===
The Figurine (Araromire) Soundtrack

Soundtrack album by Wale Waves
- Released: September 2013
- Genre: Film soundtrack
- Length: 21:50
- Label: Cisum Entertainment
- Producers: Netto; George Nathaniel

Professional ratings
Review scores
Source	Rating
Nollywood Reinvented	4.5/5 stars

The song "Araromire" by Wale Waves is one of the most anticipated and highly acclaimed film soundtracks of the 2000s and Wale Waves has been constantly praised for his beautiful and powerful vocals on the song. The soundtrack was sung by Wale Waves, produced by Netto and George Nathaniel under Cisum Entertainment music label. Africalypso is a song by Lagbaja from Africano...the mother of groove album of 2005 and was produced by Motherlan' Music label.

==== Track listing ====
No.	Title	Singer(s)	Length
1.	"Araromire"	Wale Waves	02:53
2.	"We are together"	George Nathanie	02:00
3.	"Africalypso"	Lagbaja	07:07
4.	"Awade"	Wasiu Ayinde Marshall	09:50
Total length:			21:50

== Release ==
=== Pre-release and promotions ===
According to Kunle Afolayan, it was important to reach out to the audience and one good way was through social networking sites like Facebook, Twitter and YouTube. While the film was in production, photographs of scenes and locations were posted on the group page set up for The Figurine. He also stated that another important strategy was 'word of mouth' from which the movie benefited a lot.

A teaser trailer was released during the early months of 2009 and the movie sparked anticipations among movie fans. The first official trailer for the movie was released on 10 August 2009 and a Cinema promo was also released to the public on October 1, 2009

=== Premiere ===
The movie premiered in film festivals including The London African Film Festival, New York African Film Festival, Tokyo African Film Festival and Rotterdam International Film Festival. Golden Effects Pictures and Silverbird distributed the movie in Nigeria.

It premiered in Lagos on 2 October 2009 and was afterwards screened across Africa, Europe, America and Asia. Releases were also subtitled in French with the title La Figurine as well as Spanish with the title Figurilla for the respective audiences.

== Reception ==
=== Critical reception ===
The Figurine was critically acclaimed. It was praised for its top-notch cinematography, props, and for being the movie to finally break the jinx of mediocrity in Nollywood and for leading the revolutionary birth of what has been termed New-Nollywood. Nollywood Reinvented praised the movie for its brilliant cinematography, memorable soundtrack, accurate set designing, 'the figurine Sculpture' and how the extras were used so as not to ruin the movie. It rated the film 74% and wrote "Cinema is an art. Kunle Afolayan knows Cinema, therefore following the simple rules of logic, Kunle Afolayan is an artist". Tosin Johnson wrote: "A purely African Story, The Figurine Opens us into a relatively new genre in African story telling – A Psychological thriller. This was delivered with very impressive emotional acting and a colorful array of costumes".

Itua Ewoigbokhan of DStv praised Afolayan's story telling power and stated: "Kunle Afolayan’s The Figurine makes a strong point of seeking to change cinema culture in Nigeria and through this movie he wants viewers to think about the film - not just see it. Viewers of The Figurine: Araromire will leave the cinema neither happy nor sad. They will leave filled with questions, thus fulfilling what Afolayan set out to do: make us think". Sakari Maatta of Elitisti, a Finnish movie online magazine gave a rating of 2.5 out of 5 stars and concluded: "The Figurine reflects the number of everyday topics such as friendship, love and loyalty, role of the family and, ultimately; betrayal and death. Kemi Adesoye the scriptwriter manages to offer in the last minutes, the best possible to pull off a surprise turn of events, which evokes thoughts".

tvNolly Commented "Afolayan deserves credit for a superb and almost flawless production. The musical score is well produced, the lighting does justice to many of Lola Maja-Okojevoh’s artistic creations, the special effects add to the magical feel and all in all, it is a great achievement not just for Nollywood but for the African cinematic industry as a whole. For raising the cinematographic bar to record heights and putting our culture in the limelight, The Figurine is one ‘reference’ movie that will be spoken about years to come". Femi Owolabi gave it 3 out of 4 stars and states: "The film’s cultural relevance is so profound and its status in the social sphere is remarkable. The historical essence is highly applaudable too" "your eyes may never forgive you if you don’t get to see this exceptionally brilliant movie".

Ayo Stephens commented that "the major themes of fate and faith touched in this movie are very weighty ones and the writer does a very good job in leaving the audience to choose their sides. The Figurine is a must see, it would start up a discussion in you before you join the one going on around you". Nollywood Reinvented commended Kunle Afolayan's show of ingenuity by producing, directing and starring in a single film, and the film still ends up turning out good: "Being able to direct, produce and then come and act was something I previously regarded as impossible for any movie but hey! Kunle just defies all laws of nature it seems." She also commended Funlola Aofiyebi's acting in the film stating: "Funlola as the comic relief; Amazing acting! It was never at one point over acting or underacting is what I loved the most about her performance."

Itua Ewoigbokhan commended the use of Yoruba and English languages interchangeably to give realistic feel to the film: "The Yoruba language spoken sometimes in the movie helped create a certain level of realism. The characters spoke Yoruba to themselves in private and reverted to the English language for more formal conversations as regular people would in real life. This level of detail would ensure a wider audience watches The Figurine".

=== Box office ===
The Figurine was a success at the Nigerian box office. Due to the presence of few cinemas in the country as of 2009, the film's total gross was approximated at around 30 million Naira, after eight weeks of theatrical run. However, the movie was able to recoup its investment through international screenings. The movie was also screened in rented halls in Nigerian cities and schools.

The movie became the highest grossing Nigerian film until the 2010 film Ijé took over this title, a record it held for four years, until it was overtaken in 2014 by Half of a Yellow Sun (2013).

=== Awards ===
The Figurine received ten nominations at the 6th Africa Movie Academy Awards and won five awards including the award for The Best Picture. It was the film with most wins at the ceremony. In October 2014, The Figurine topped Nolly Silver Screen Magazine's list of "The 10 Best Nollywood Films Ever Made.

==== Complete list of awards ====
Award	Year of award	Category	Recipient/Nominee	Result	Notes	Ref
6th Africa Movie Academy Awards	2010	Best Picture	Kunle Afolayan, Ramsey Nouah	Won		
6th Africa Movie Academy Awards	2010	Best Director	Kunle Afolayan	Nominated	lost to Shirley Frimpong-Manso for Perfect Picture	
6th Africa Movie Academy Awards	2010	Best Performance by an Actor in a leading Role	Ramsey Nouah	Won		
6th Africa Movie Academy Awards	2010	Best Performance by an Actress in a leading Role	Funlola Aofiyebi-Raimi	Nominated	lost to Tapiwa Gwaza for Seasons of a life	
6th Africa Movie Academy Awards	2010	Best Performance by a Child Actor	Tobe Oboli	Nominated	lost to Teddy Onyago and Bill Oloo for Togetherness Supreme	
6th Africa Movie Academy Awards	2010	Heart of Africa	Kunle Afolayan	Won		
6th Africa Movie Academy Awards	2010	Achievement in Art Direction	Pat Nebo	Nominated	lost to Fulani	
6th Africa Movie Academy Awards	2010	Achievement in Visual Effects	Obiora Okafor	Won		
6th Africa Movie Academy Awards	2010	Best Original Soundtrack	Wale Waves	Nominated	lost to A Sting in a Tale	
6th Africa Movie Academy Awards	2010	Achievement in Cinematography	Yinka Edward	Won		
6th Screen Nation Awards	2011	Favourite West African film	Kunle Afolayan	Nominated	lost to The Mirror Boy	
6th Screen Nation Awards	2011	Favourite West African Actor	Ramsey Nouah	Nominated	lost to Majid Michel	

=== Film analysis and themes ===
The story in The Figurine though seemed like a typical African tale, is in fact entirely fiction. The Village depicted, Araromire doesn't really exist (in tale, and in real life) and there is no goddess called "Araromire" in Nigeria. The theme music; though most believe is in Yoruba language, it isn't, and the chant is totally meaningless. The film has been described to be "characterized by a strong spiritual theme spiced with a bit of romance". Sakari Maatta comments that the film reflects the number of everyday topics such as friendship, love and loyalty, role of the family and, ultimately, betrayal and death. The lingering rhetoric question on the conclusion of the film remains: "is The Figurine a story of a love triangle, friendship, loyalty, betrayal? Or is it about the lingering power of curses, whether or not we believe in fate?"

The goddess, Araromire has often been described as "neither good nor evil", since anyone who comes in contact with her will succeed for seven years then suffer for another seven years that follows it. As it is seen at the beginning of the film, the priest who invoked the spirit of Araromire drowns in the river after seven years of coming in contact with her: "Araromire becomes wrathful, unleashing terror and destruction on whoever has her in custody. It is unfortunate that even the priest couldn't escape the adverse side of the deity", Femi Owolabi comments. Itua Otaigbe Ewoigbokhan of Africa Magic describes the tale of Araromire as a modified version of Joseph's interpretation of Pharaoh's dream about Egypt from the Bible.

In the present day of The Figurine world, Mona is still disturbed after getting to know about the folktale of the statue her husband has placed in their home; Sakari Maatta interprets this to mean that even though such old myths and beliefs have not been given too much weight in the film's society, they still live in the subconscious of the people. Ayo Stephens cited that Nigerian culture is sold to the audience throughout the film, giving an example of the scene where Junior (Tobe Oboli) (aged 7) is instructed by her mother, Mona to prostrate and greet his father both in Yoruba and Urhobo, which are respectively his father's and mother's dialects.

The conclusion of the film which is left undecided has been subject to different interpretations. Most two popular interpretations are: a first possible scenario which explains that maybe the Araromire is really a powerful and real goddess. Using the phrase "who the gods want to destroy they first make mad", Itua Otaigbe Ewoigbokhan explained that Femi may have been possessed by the goddess to get so irrationally in love with Mona, leading to rage which results in the doom of him and the other parties. This means Araromire uses Femi's love as a tool to accomplish its mission. A second possible scenario explains that Araromire might really be a myth. Judging that Femi bribes officials to be posted to Araromire in order to be with Sola and Mona, it's also possible he has placed the Araromire in the Shrine and cunningly leads Sola to the place during trek. This is a very possible scenario, since the folktale in fact says that the Araromire has been "destroyed" by the Villagers. A resolution to this scenario will render the loss of jobs, Sola's kids accident as coincidence. And that Femi's Asthma and eyesight mystery, and his father's cancer mystery can be somehow explained scientifically. However, many analysts hold the conclusion that Araromire is responsible for the occurrences in the film. It has been derived that even though Femi is the orchestrator of the events, there's a glaring dominance of the goddess’ powers.

Anuli Agina of Pan-African University in his analysis of the film strongly believes that the film itself drives the viewers to believe in Araromire's powers. He cited instances such as; the fear evoked by Femi's father when Femi mentioned its name, the lecturer's curiosity. It affirms that there are several strands in the storytelling that points to the presence of the goddess in the lives of the three friends. He mentioned instances such; sounds heard on the parade ground, which mysteriously led Sola and Femi closer to the Sculpture; the heavy rain when: the Villagers burnt Araromire's shrine, the sculpture was discovered by the two friends and when both friends to returned it; the cure of Femi's health problems and his father's; the quick rise to success of Sola, without a change of his reckless attitude; the loss of Sola's son, Mona's miscarriage and so on. He concludes his analysis by stating: "With deliberate or inadvertent camera movements, the film compels the belief that Araromire the goddess is not only powerful, but also present in the lives of those who touch her. There is a conflict of opposing forces, but clearly, one is the more powerful or the film director chose to make it so. The only incident that discredits Araromire’s powers is that Femi does not have the woman of his dreams". He says even though Afolayan skillfully presents two options, he has made one very less plausible.

== Home media ==
The movie was released on DVD on 12 December 2011 by Golden Effects Pictures. The DVD is a four-hour duration disc and it contains bonus content like The Making of and Deleted Scenes. The film was also released on VOD platforms. The film was reissued on 15 December 2014 in a special edition collection DVD tagged "Kunle Afolayan’s Collection". The DVD package also consists Irapada (2006) and Phone Swap (2012), which are Afolayan's other films.

== Legacy ==
=== Educational study ===
The Figurine has often been used as a subject of study, assignments and educational subjects in institutions. Afolayan in an interview declared that he had personally granted over twenty interviews to students who were writing their thesis on The Figurine in their various schools. He has also been invited by school lecturer talk to students about the film.

=== Adaptation ===
A book detailing the analysis of events in The Figurine, titled Auteuring Nollywood: Critical Perspectives on The Figurine was released on 31 July 2014. The book is the first book in the history of Nigerian Cinema to be devoted to the work of a single Nigerian film director and it contains scholarly essays, which explores "the thematic focus and cinematic style employed in The Figurine". It also contains interviews with the cast and crew of the film, insights into the African and Nigerian film industry and the trends in the New Nigerian Cinema. The idea to make a book based on the film had been around even before the release of the film.

Contributors to the 455-page book include; Sola Osofisan, Dele Layiwola, Chukwuma Okoye, Jane Thorburn, Matthew H. Brown, Gideon Tanimonure, A.G.A Bello, Foluke Ogunleye and Hyginus Ekwuazi. Foreword is written by Jonathan Haynes, Afterword by Onookome Okome and Adeshina Afolayan edited the book.

The launch of the book had several notable political and film stakeholders in attendance, together with some entertainment people. Since its release, the book has been getting rave reviews from critics, educators and film scholars. The director of the original film has also expressed how honoured and impressed he is about the book.

== See also ==
- List of Nigerian films of 2009
