= New Nigerian Cinema =

Phrase in Nigerian Cinema

New Nigerian Cinema or New Nigerian Cinema era (also known as New Wave or controversially as New Nollywood) is an emerging phase in Nigerian cinema, in which there became a major shift in the method of film production, from the video format, which came about during the video boom, back to the cinema method, which constituted the films produced in the Golden era of Nigerian cinema history. The films in the New Wave are specifically characterized by improved narrative complexity, aesthetic nuance, much higher budgets and advanced overall production values, when compared to video films from the second generation of filmmakers. They are mostly released theatrically, although some are still released directly on DVD.

Since the early 2000s, several discussions and conferences have been held, based on how to revamp the Nigerian film industry and bring about more professionalism like it used to be in the golden era. During this time, some other filmmakers, such as Tunde Kelani and Tade Ogidan tried to make "break away" films, which were supposedly different from the norm. The now defunct Amstel Malta Box Office production company also made several films with the aim of making a difference. However, all of these films were also produced in the same video format that the other filmmakers used, albeit with quality stories and better directions. New Nigerian Cinema finally emerged in the mid-2000s with the release of films such as Irapada (2006) and The Amazing Grace (2006). The Figurine (2009) by Kunle Afolayan is generally regarded as the break out film, which heightened the media attention towards "New Nigerian Cinema" revolution, due to its critical and commercial success in Nigeria, as well as screenings in notable international film festivals.

In the mid 2000s, Nigeria began to experience the growth of cinemas, which was initially structured for the middle and upper class. The Silverbird Group is the first company to launch a series of modern Cinema houses across major cities in Nigeria, mostly situated in affluent areas and districts. It launched its cinema chains in 2004, starting with the Silverbird Galleria in Victoria Island, Lagos. Not long after the establishment of Silverbird cinemas, Genesis Deluxe Cinemas and Ozone Cinemas were also launched, creating a competition in the cinema business. Much later, in the 2010s, Film House cinemas and Viva cinemas also came into the picture, leading into wider availability of cinemas in the country, and most importantly, availability outside the affluent neighbourhoods.

Since 2006, there have been several "Project Nollywood" funds by the Nigerian Government, provided to filmmakers, in order to aid the production of high quality films, as well as to aid proper distribution infrastructure across the country. The grants have also been used to help more Nigerian filmmakers to go for formal training in film schools. As at 2020, the highest grossing film in Nigerian contemporary film history is Omo Ghetto: The Saga (2020), which grossed approximately ₦636 million. As of 2013, Nigerian cinema is rated as the third most valuable film industry in the world based on its worth and overall revenues generated.

== Beginnings ==
Since the early 2000s, several discussions and conferences have been held, based on how to revamp the Nigerian film industry and bring about more professionalism like it used to be in the 1970s. During this time, some other filmmakers tried to make "break away" films, which were quite different from the norm; such films include: Thunderbolt (2001) by Tunde Kelani, Dangerous Twins (2004) by Tade Ogidan, Madam dearest (2005) also by Tade Ogidan and 30 Days by Mildred Okwo amongst other. The now defunct Amstel Malta Box Office production company also made several films with the aim of making a difference. However, all of these films were also produced in the same video format that the other filmmakers used, albeit with quality stories and better directions.

== Return of the cinemas ==
In the Golden Age, the cinema culture was very vibrant amongst Nigerians. However, the culture started declining towards the late 1980s and the cinema business came crumbling into the 1990s. Few years into the 21st century, Nigeria began to experience the growth of cinemas, which was initially structured for the middle and upper class. The Silverbird Group is the first company to launch a series of modern Cinema houses across major cities in Nigeria, mostly situated in affluent areas and districts. It launched its cinema chains in 2004, starting with the Silverbird Galleria in Victoria Island, Lagos. The Silverbird Galleria is a large shopping mall, with an upscale cinema facility and various outlets where mercantile activities take place. This provides more reasons to visit the place beyond just watching films, but more of a social activity and a modified sort of entertainment beyond film watching. This trend has given another probable explanation as to the demise of the Nigerian cinema culture in the 1980s, which might have been as a result of the unfashionable appearance of most cinemas of the Golden era.

Silverbird cinemas upon establishment started screening Nigerian films with high production quality, as a result discouraging poor film production; the cinema culture in the Nigerian cities with film theatres started experiencing a significant improvement, and with huge potentials. However, well produced Nigerian films were generally very few at the time; even at that, most films screened were produced in Yoruba-language, because they attracted more crowd, compared to a typical English-language film which often had no viewers when screened. The first New wave film to be shown at a cinema was the Yoruba-language film Irapada (2006) by Kunle Afolayan, which was screened at the Silverbird Galleria in Lagos.

The Silverbird experiment became very successful, and as a result, the group launched few more cinema branches in Lagos and other cities in the country. Not long after the establishment of Silverbird cinemas, Genesis Deluxe Cinemas and Ozone Cinemas were also launched creating a competition in the cinema business. However, the cinemas at start were still very under-patronized, as most of them were established in the upscale areas; "It hardly makes sense for people to travel far to indulge in the pleasure of watching films, especially with the attendant problems of traffic and logistics", stated Jide Kosoko, pushing for establishment of theatres in inner neighbourhoods and Local Government Areas. Much later, in the 2010s, Filmhouse Cinema also came into the picture, leading to more cinemas in the country and availability outside the affluent neighbourhoods.

== Project Nollywood government funds ==
In 2006, "Project Nollywood" was launched by the Nigerian Government, in conjunction with Ecobank. The project provided ₦100 million (US$781,000) to Nigerian filmmakers to produce high quality films. Films produced with this grant include: Charles Novia's Caught In The Middle (2007), Chico Ejiro's 100 Days In The Jungle (2007) and Fred Amata's Letters to a Stranger (2007), which were all produced using digital cinematography. Ecobank also funded a multimillion Naira distribution network across the country during this period.

In 2010, the administration of President Goodluck Jonathan launched a ₦30 billion (US$200 million) "Creative and Entertainment Industry" Intervention Fund, financed by Bank of Industry (BOI), in conjunction with Nigerian Export and Import (NEXIM) Bank. This grant, although dubbed as a spin-off of "Project Nollywood", was for the entire Nigerian Creative Arts and Entertainment sector. The vision of the grant for the film industry however is to help more Nigerian filmmakers in training, funding, and also help in creating necessary infrastructure for the industry. One of the major distribution companies established through this loan is FilmHouse Cinemas. Started by Kene Mparu and Kene Okwuosa in 2012, the cinema chain as at 2014 has modern theatres in four cities in Nigeria, including Lagos, Ibadan, Asaba and Calabar, with plans to have at least 25 cinemas across the country. Other distribution companies who benefitted from the grant include: Silverbird Cinemas, Ozone Cinemas, Viva Cinemas and G-Media. The 2012 film Doctor Bello (2012) by Tony Abulu is the first film to be funded with this grant.

In 2013, a smaller new grant of ₦3 billion (US$20 million) was awarded once again solely for Nollywood, and specifically for the production of high quality films. Other films that benefitted from one "Project Nollywood" grant or another include: Flower Girl (2013), Half of a Yellow Sun (2013) and The Department (2015). Several filmmakers were also sponsored for formal training in film schools with this grant.

In 2015, the Bank of Industry (BOI) launched another "NollyFund" program for the purpose of giving financial support in form of loans to film producers. A NollyFund Implementation Advisory Group was set up for the program, in order to ensure that only commercially viable scripts with good storylines benefit from the scheme. The group consist of cinema management experts, national film distributors, production and post-production experts, film critics, and film producers; their sole purpose is to critically review all the film scripts and associated budgets submitted to the Bank of Industry by film producers and make "technical recommendations to the management for final credit appraisal and subsequent approval in line with the Bank's Credit Policy".

== Breakout ==
The popular 2009 thriller film The Figurine is generally considered the game changer, which heightened the media attention towards "New Nigerian Cinema" revolution. The film was a critical and commercial success in Nigeria, and it was also screened in international film festivals. The 2010 film Ijé by Chineze Anyaene, overtook The Figurine to become the highest grossing Nigerian film; a record it held for four years, until it was overtaken in 2014 by Half of a Yellow Sun (2013). Other popular films released in the early years of this revolution include: The Amazing Grace (2006) by Jeta Amata, Through the Glass (2008) by Stephanie Okereke, Anchor Baby (2010) by Lonzo Nzekwe, Inale (2010) by Jeta Amata, Tango with Me (2010) by Mahmood Ali-Balogun and The Mirror Boy (2011) by Obi Emelonye, amongst others.

By the end of 2013, the film industry reportedly hit a record breaking revenue of ₦1.72 trillion (US$11 billion). As of 2014, the industry was worth ₦853.9 billion (US$5.1 billion) making it the third most valuable film industry in the world, behind the United States and India. It contributed about 1.4% to Nigeria's economy; this was attributed to the increase in the number of quality films produced and more formal distribution methods.

== Production ==
Actor Wale Ojo, one of the pioneers and a strong supporter of the New Nigerian Cinema movement describes the movement as "an elevation of Nigerian film -- high production values, good strong narratives, stories that capture the essence of who we are as Nigerians, as Africans [...] It is a new movement, it's a renaissance, it's a rebirth if you like -- perhaps even a throwback to the 70s but obviously with a very, very modern tint, a very modern glaze to it -- and it's exciting,". Filmmaker Victor Okhai says: "It is expected that the quality of films will improve. We are at a stage where we can no longer play the mediocre".

Unlike the Video film era, films in the new wave are generally of much improved quality, with considerably bigger budgets; averaging between ₦40 million (US$250,000) and ₦120 million ($750,000). These films' production periods take months and even span into years, a far cry from the films in video format which are usually shot in a matter of days or weeks. Other notable improvements in the New Nollywood include: more subtle performances from actor, different from the overt melodrama which constituted the video era; more practical; more logical and generally better stories.

Themes explored in these films are often characterized by consciously cosmopolitan themes, as most of the filmmakers are relatively young. The Figurine, for example has a narrative which contains supernatural themes similar to the average video film; it is however concluded with an inconclusive logical twist which has been subjected to analytical debates.

== Distribution ==
A proper copyright and distribution system still remained one of the major challenges in the New Nigerian Cinema; this owes to the initial unavailability of enough cinemas, thereby making it particularly difficult (though not impossible) for filmmakers to recoup their investments. As at 2014, Nigeria had just 23 movie theatres, with approximately hundred screens. This was pretty small for a population of 170 million, with a rapidly emerging middle class. More so, too small to sustain a large film industry.

As a result of the inability to make profits through only cinema earnings, many of the new filmmakers have resorted to sponsorships and product placements as a means of recouping production costs. An example of such filmmakers is Kunle Afolayan, who stated that sponsorship could fund about 30 to 50 percent of a film's budget. Afolayan in particular has also cultivated the habit of screening his films in public halls and theatres, especially in areas lacking cinemas. Tunde Kelani is another notable filmmaker who usually employs this method of distribution. Another method filmmakers use in recouping investments is by organizing premium private screenings for corporate organizations, as well as entering into deals with pay-TV networks and free-to-air broadcasters across the continent. Online film rights are also acquired by Video on demand platforms across the continent and beyond.

Some other filmmakers have also turned the way of targeting foreign developed markets, by featuring foreign cast members – examples: Black November (2012) by Jeta Amata, Doctor Bello (2013) by Tony Abulu and Half of a Yellow Sun (2013) by Biyi Bandele; this strategy, which initially seemed like the "easy way out" has however been deemed unsustainable, and most of the films in fact were not able to break even in the targeted markets. In recent times, there have also been talks on establishing low cost and open air cinemas in neighbourhoods, like there was in the 1970s; none has however materialized as of 2015.

From early years of the New Wave till present day, DVD is considered a "no go" area, due to the prevalent copyright infringement in the country. In no time, "New Nollywood" became synonymous with delayed DVD release, generally taking up to three or four years before release. This is generally because filmmakers intend to maximize profit before releasing on DVD, which is no longer profitable at the moment. Some filmmakers also believed the good films are better restricted to the cinemas, as it's ridiculous to make such outstanding efforts only to make the films disappear into a "mob of useless films" which were still prevalent as of 2012, despite the New Cinema movement. This notion made screening at the cinemas to also become like a criterion for viewers to discern which film to hit or miss. However, unlike in the video film era where many filmmakers were left to the mercy of "industry sharks and pirates" that profited from their creativity, details of sales and box office returns were now better kept, thereby creating a sort of investor-confidence in the now relatively formal film sector.

== Copyright infringement ==
Not too long after the New Nigerian Cinema movement was embraced, the malaise of copyright violation quickly caught up with movies made in this era as well. Initially, the films were copied immediately following their DVD releases; examples of films given huge media attention due to infringement include: Maami (2011) by Tunde Kelani and Half of a Yellow Sun. The phenomenon became a major national concern in 2015, after October 1 (2014) by Kunle Afolayan was leaked even before it was released on DVD. This turn of events raised several questions on how this was possible, and concerns over the safety of film copies being sent to cinema houses for screening.

The cause of copyright violation has been attributed to various factors, which include: poor content management by distributors, who fail to implement the available "anti-piracy strategies and tools", and also laxity from the government. National Film and Video Censors Board (NFVCB) had put in place several policies to curb infringement, many of which had little or no impact. Nigerian Copyright Commission (NCC) also became active in pursuing infringers, instituting projects such as "Strategic Action Against Piracy (STRAP)". However, it was reported that the bootleggers, who are mostly located in Alaba market, a very congested and disorganized area, have often resisted arrest by law enforcement officials, whom they usually engage in fierce battles by employing all manners of dangerous weapons.

The NCC also began the implementation of a new "Copyright Optical Discs Plants Regulations", which gives the NCC administrative and enforcement powers over the production processes of optical discs' manufacturers and plants as well as over the importation and exportation of the finished film products. All these measures have however been of little impact, as unauthorized copying remained prevalent, and NCC itself have been accused of aiding the practice. Still in the bid to fight infringement, Audio-Visual Rights Society (AVRS) was established, headed by Mahmood Ali-Balogun. AVRS is a Collective Management Organization set up to help prevent creative works from being duplicated and overused by unauthorised bodies. It is affiliated to World Intellectual Property Organization (WIPO), the Nigerian Copyright Commission (NCC) and the Nigeria Film Corporation (NFC) with the sole purpose of overseeing the collection and distribution of the royalties on behalf of the copyright owners in the film industry.

In January 2015, the Nigerian Government launched another project tagged "Innovation Distribution Fund (IDF)" under the existing "Project Nollywood" to help protect copyright, by helping to expand and standardize the film distribution system. The fund was targeted at businesses operating or seeking to operate in the film distribution sector; it aimed to co-finance new channels and support the expansion of current distribution system and to help boost the number and quality of distribution options, including technology-based solutions such as digital streaming.

In June 2015, Business Day estimated that about ₦7.5 billion (US$46 million) is lost to copyright violation yearly in Nigeria. It is particularly difficult to curb infringement in the Nigerian film industry, majorly because the video film era was built and sustained on its framework, which ironically eventually became its downfall and has become a major problem in the industry. The problem has become almost incorporated into the Nigerian distribution system, as the people involved at this time are mostly unprofessional film people of the video boom period, who are now out of business but still want to retain their wealthy status.

== See also ==
- Cinema of Nigeria
- Media in Nigeria
