= Film styles =

Recognizable film technique used by a filmmaker

Film style refers to recognizable cinematic techniques used by filmmakers to create specific value in their work. These techniques can include all aspects of film language, including: sound design, mise-en-scène, dialogue, cinematography, editing, or direction.

== Style and the director ==
A film director may have a distinctive filmmaking style that differs from other directors, similar to an author's own distinctive writing style. Through the analysis of film techniques, differences between filmmakers' styles become apparent.

There are many technical possibilities available to filmmakers. As a result, no single film will be made using every single technique. Historical circumstances, for example, limit the choices for the director. During the silent film era, filmmakers were not able to use synchronized dialogue until sound became possible in the late 1920s. Films before the 1930s were black and white; now directors have the choice of shooting in color tints or black and white.

Directors can choose how to use film language. One of the most noticeable ways to affect film style is through mise-en-scène, or what appears on the screen. Lighting, costumes, props, camera movements, and backgrounds are all part of mise-en-scène. There are countless ways to create a film based on the same script simply through changing the mise-en-scène. Adjusting these techniques creates meaning and can highlight aspects of the narrative. Many filmmakers will create the overall film style to reflect the story.

== Style and audience ==
Many films conform to the Classical Hollywood narrative film style, which is a set of guidelines that many filmmakers tend to follow. The story in this style is told chronologically in a cause and effect relationship. The main principle in this film style is continuity editing, where editing, camera, and sound should be considered "invisible" to the viewers. In other words, attention should not be brought to these elements.

While many filmmakers conform to these guidelines, there are other filmmakers that ignore the guidelines and do bring attention to the film techniques. These filmmakers may violate the standard conventions of film in order to create an innovative style or draw attention to particular aspects of film language.

The director decides what is and is not on the screen, guiding what the audience looks at and notices. Although the audience may not consciously absorb film style, it still affects the viewer's experience of the film.

When viewers watch a film, they may have certain expectations based on previous experiences of film because some techniques are commonly found in film and have become conventional. For example, after a long shot there may commonly be a cut to a closer view. If a character is walking across the stage, the audience expects the camera to pan or follow the character's movement. Viewers expect to interact with and be a part of the film, rather than simply being shown a group of images. These expectations come from experiences with both the real and film worlds; we follow a character in our real world with our eyes, just as a camera pans to follow a character on the screen. The audience expects films to appear like real life, and be shot according to a certain style. Classical Hollywood narrative film styles and the conventions of other genres help to guide the audience in what to expect. Some film makers use styles that challenge these conventions.

== Difference between genre and film style ==
Film style and film genre should not be confused; they are different aspects of the medium. Style is the way a movie is filmed, as in the techniques that are used in the production process. Genre is the category a film is placed in regarding the narrative elements. For instance, Western films are about the American frontier, romance films are about love, and so on.

Film style categorizes films based on the techniques used in the making of the film, such as cinematography or lighting. Two films may be from the same genre, but may well look different as a result of the film style. For example, Independence Day and Cloverfield are both sci-fi, action films about the possible end of the world. However, they are shot differently, with Cloverfield using a handheld camera for the entire movie. Films in the same genre do not necessarily have the same film style. Therefore, film genre and film style are two separate, distinct terms in film.

== Types of film styles ==
- Absolute
- Arthouse
  - Art horror
  - Arthouse action
  - European art
- Auteur
- Bourekas
- Documentary
  - Cinéma vérité
  - Direct cinema
  - Documentary mode
  - Fly on the wall
- Cannibal
- Experimental
  - Film-poem
- Film noir
  - Neo-noir
- Heimatfilm
- Kammerspielfilm
- Narrative
- Underground
  - German underground horror
- Spaghetti Western
- Realist
  - Poetic
  - Neorealist
  - Socialist
  - Social
    - Kitchen sink
- Structural
- Surrealist

=== Group styles ===
While film style can describe the techniques used by specific filmmakers, it can also be used to describe a movement or group of filmmakers from the same area and/or time period.

- New Wave movements
  - American ('New Hollywood' or 'Movie Brats')
  - Australian ('Australian Film Revival')
  - Brazilian ('Cinema Novo' or 'Novo Cinema')
  - British
  - Czechoslovak
  - French (Nouvelle Vague) — the inaugural New Wave cinema movement
  - German ('New German Cinema')
  - Hong Kong — a movement led by director Tsui Hark
  - Indian ('Parallel cinema') — began around the same time as the French New Wave
  - Japanese (Nuberu Bagu) — began around the same time as the French New Wave
  - Malayalam ('New generation')
  - Mexican ('Nuevo Cine Mexicano')
  - Nigerian ('New Nigerian Cinema' or 'New Nollywood')
  - Persian/Iranian — began in the 1960s
  - Philippine New Wave, also known as Filipino New Wave or Contemporary Philippine Cinema
  - Romanian
  - Taiwan
  - Toronto
  - Thai

American groups/movements:

- American Eccentric Cinema
- Cinema of Transgression
- Classical Hollywood
- Film gris
- L.A. Rebellion
- New Hollywood
- No wave

British groups/movements:

- Brighton School
- British New Wave
- Documentary Film Movement
- Free Cinema

French groups/movements:

- Cinéma du look
- Cinéma pur
- French impressionist
- Lettrist
- New French Extremity
- Nouvelle Vague

German groups/movements:

- Berlin School
- German Expressionist
- New German Cinema
- New Objectivity
- Prussian film

Italian groups/movements:

- Calligrafismo
- Cinecittà
- Commedia all'italiana
- Hollywood on the Tiber
- Italian futurism
- Italian neorealism
- Poliziotteschi
- White Phones
- Telefoni Bianchi

Other groups/movements:

- Budapest school
- Cinema da Boca do Lixo
- Dogme 95
- Erra Cinema
- Nigerian Golden Age
- Grupo Cine Liberación
- New Queer
- Persian Film
- Polish Film School
- Praška filmska škola
- Pure Film Movement
- Remodernist
- Soviet Montage
- Soviet Parallel
- Swedish realism
- Third Cinema
- Video film era
- Vulgar auteurism
- Yugoslav Black Wave
