= Golden Age of Nigerian Cinema =

Motion used in Nigeria cinema pictures

Golden Age or Golden era are terms used in Nigerian film history to designate the motion picture industry of Nigeria from the late 1950s to the late 1980s. It captures the mode of visual and sound production, as well as the method of distribution employed during this period. This period began with the formal recognition of the Nigerian Film Unit as a sector in 1954, with the first film entirely copyrighted to this unit being Fincho (1957) by Sam Zebba.

After Nigeria's independence in 1960, the cinema business rapidly expanded, with new cinema houses being established. As a result, Nigerian content in theatres increased from the late 1960s into the 1970s, especially productions from Western Nigeria, owing to former theatre practitioners such as Hubert Ogunde and Moses Olaiya transitioning into the big screen. In 1972, the Indigenization Decree was issued by Yakubu Gowon, which demanded the transfer of ownership of about a total of 300 film theatres from their foreign owners to Nigerians, which resulted in more Nigerians playing active roles in the cinema and film.

The oil boom of 1973 through 1978 also contributed immensely to the spontaneous boost of the cinema culture in Nigeria, as the improved economic situation allowed many citizens to have disposable income to spend on cinema and home television sets. After several moderately successful films, Papa Ajasco (1984) by Wale Adenuga became one of the first Nigerian Blockbusters, reportedly grossing about ₦61,000 (approx. 2015 ₦21.5 million) in three days. A year later, Mosebolatan (1985) by Moses Olaiya also grossed ₦107,000 (approx. 2015 ₦44.2 million) in five days. The 1980s was also a period of major boom in the television industry, with several books from notable authors being adapted into television series. Many of these television productions were later released on video. As a result, a small scale informal video trade developed, which led to the emergence of the Video boom in the 1990s.

The Golden Age began to face a major decline in the late 1980s. This decline has been attributed to several factors, including the reduction in the value of Naira, lack of finance and marketing support, lack of standard film studios and production equipment, frequent Government structural adjustment programmes due to military dictatorships, as well as inexperience on the part of practitioners. It is also generally believed by stakeholders that the decline in this era was due to negligence as a result of the oil boom, which affected other sectors of the Nigerian economy as well. It has also been noted to be a result of an increase in the ownership of television sets across the country: the films produced during this era usually screened over a single weekend and were released on video the following week. It no longer made sense to visit the theatres, and most families preferred to wait a few days to get their hands on the VHS copies. In the early 1990s, only a few of the once vibrant cinema houses were still in operation, and all had collapsed before 1999. However, as of 2009, an emerging movement in the film industry is rapidly reviving the cinema culture of Nigerians once again.

== History ==
=== Pre-Independence ===
In 1954, before Nigeria's independence, the Nigerian film industry became formally recognized as a sector and was grouped as a unit in the information department of the then Ministry of Information. This unit was a re-organized local unit, which united the broader term 'Nigerian Film Unit' which had been established in 1949; the function of this film unit was to produce documentary films and newsreels on local events of great importance, leading to the dominance of educative films in Nigerian theatres in the late 1950s As of 1954, mobile cinema vans played to at least 3.5 million people in Nigeria, and films being produced by the Nigerian Film Unit were screened for free at the 44 available cinemas. The first film entirely copyrighted to this unit is Fincho (1957) by Sam Zebba; Fincho is also known as the first Nigerian film to be shot in colour.

=== Post-Independence ===
After Nigeria gained independence in 1960, the cinema business rapidly expanded, with new cinema houses being established. However, there came a significant influx of American, Indian, Chinese and Japanese films; posters of films from these countries were all over theatre halls and actors from these industries became very popular in Nigeria. It was reported that Nigerian kids began to know more on "travails of American Indians than they did about the Wole Soyinka-led Mbari Mbayo cultural group, or the socio-cultural history of Nigeria". However, in the late 1960s and into the 1970s, Nigerian productions in theatres increased gradually, especially productions from Western Nigeria; this was basically due to former theatre practitioners such as Hubert Ogunde, Moses Olaiya, Jab Adu, Isola Ogunsola, Ladi Ladebo, Sanya Dosumu and Sadiq Balewa amongst others, who transitioned into the big screen. Latola Films, which started the production of motion pictures since 1962, has often been noted as the earliest Nigerian indigenous film production company. Television broadcasting in Nigeria also began in the 1960s and received much government support in its early years.

== Indigenization Decree and the 1970s boom ==
In 1972, concerned about the influx of foreign culture into Nigeria, the Indigenization Decree was issued by the then head of state Yakubu Gowon; which demands the transfer of ownership of about a total of 300 film theatres in the country from their foreign owners to Nigerians. Also, more Nigerians started playing active roles in cinema establishment; notable examples of this include: Metro cinema and Rivoli Cinema, which was owned by Chief Lisabi, and Danjuma Cinema by Alhaji Danjuma. This transfer also resulted in the emergence of Nigerian playwrights, screenwriters and film producers; popular literature and theatre works were adapted into motion picture. One of the most popular film people in this new wave was Hubert Ogunde, mainly because he promoted indigenous Nigerian language, arts and culture through his works.

The oil boom of 1973 through 1978 contributed immensely to the spontaneous boost of the cinema culture in Nigeria. The presence of foreign investments led to the erection of several cinema complexes. In 1976, The 5000-capacity National Arts Theatre, Iganmu was constructed in Lagos. The theatre was incorporated with two cinemas, each having a capacity of over 700 people. At this time cinema business had become a notable employer of many people and also served as an important social function, as Nigerians visited cinemas for relaxation and entertainment purposes. The increased purchasing power in Nigeria also made a wide range of citizens to have extra money to spend on cinema going and on home television sets.

Some foreign producers and directors also worked in Nigeria to make films in Nigeria, as a result of this boom, including people like Ossie Davis who directed Kongi's Harvest, a film based on the novel of the same name by Wole Soyinka, which was released in 1970. The film was adapted to screen by Soyinka, produced by Francis Oladele under the Calpenny Nigeria ltd production company. However, Ola Balogun's post-Civil War film, Amadi (1975) was one of the first notable Nigerian historical films on celluloid, which reflected on the Nigerian pre-Civil War days when Nigerians were very united. Balogun subsequently directed Ajani Ogun in 1976, a film which grew to become very popular, and is widely regarded as the first "commercial" Nigerian film, due to its success. Another film released after Ajani Ogun was Bisi – Daughter of the River (1977), which reflected Nigerian culture on film. Other popular films released in this era include: Bull Frog in the Sun (1974), Dinner with the Devil (1975); directed by the duo Sanya Dosunmu and Wole Amele, Ogunde's Aiye (1979), Jaiyesimi (1980), Cry Freedom (1981), and Eddie Ugbomah's The Great Attempt (1989); which was censored upon release, amongst others.

Mosebolatan (1985) by Moses Olaiya has been reported as the first Nigerian blockbuster, grossing approximately ₦107,000 (approx. 2015 ₦44.2 million) in five days. Before then, Papa Ajasco (1984) by Wale Adenuga was reported to have made about ₦61,000 (approx. 2015 ₦21.5 million) in three days. The success of films has been attributed to the fact that the faces of actors were already known from the once popular travelling theatre groups and the audiences were already familiar with the stories; Adesanya states that the "involvement of the Yoruba travelling theatre practitioners in motion picture production was perhaps the most auspicious single factor in the evolution of an indigenous cinema in Nigeria" Much later, Hubert Ogunde featured in Bruce Beresford's Mister Johnson (1990). It was the first American film shot on location in Nigeria and was criticized for its ridiculous perception of Africans and dark skinned people as a whole; a perception prevalent with several other western films at the time.

This boost was however not limited to only films, as this era was generally a period when Nigerian entertainment experienced major boost all round; Nigerian music also became popular and prolific during this period. The Nigerian nightlife scene came alive and highlife music was predominant. Musicians who reigned in this era include: Koola Lobitos, The Oriental Brothers, I. K. Dairo, Rex Jim Lawson, E. T. Mensah, and Victor Olaiya. In 1979, the Nigerian Government recognized the importance of film and its relationship to the Nigerian cultural identity; as a result, the Nigerian Film Corporation (NFC) was established; the corporation was created under Shehu Shagari's military regime, as a standalone government agency to help develop the film industry. The agency had the primary responsibility of regulating exhibitions of films, and censoring films shown at the cinemas - a responsibility later transferred to the National Films and Video Censor Board.

=== Emergence of Television industry in the 1980s ===
The emergence of television in Nigeria was a significant development in the Nigerian film industry. The Western Nigeria Television Service (WNTV), Nigeria's first television station, began operation in the then Western Region in October 1959. The other two regions of the country soon followed suit; with the establishment of the Eastern Nigeria Television Service (ENTV) in Enugu, in 1960, and the Radio Television Kaduna (RKTV) in Kaduna, in March 1962. Also in 1962, The Federal Government established a fourth station, the Nigerian Television Service, in the then capital, Lagos. The numbers grew rapidly and in the mid-1980s, every State in Nigeria had its own broadcasting station.

Laws were made by regulating bodies to limit foreign contents on television, with the National Commission recommending a minimum of 60 percent local programming content for all broadcasting stations. This led to television producers to begin the broadcast of local popular theatre productions. Chinua Achebe's novel, Things Fall Apart was adapted as a television series on National Television in 1987 and became very successful. At this time, Another very successful television adaptation was the adaptation of D.O. Fagunwa's 1949's novel, Igbo Olodumare. The television series, which is of the same title witnessed a tremendous success, especially in South western states, where it was reported that the show constantly left streets deserted during its broadcast on Sunday evenings. Other television successes witnessed in the 1980s include series such as: Adio Family, The Village Headmaster, Cock's Crow at Dawn, The Masquerade, Mirror in the Sun, Checkmate, Sura The Tailor, Second Chance and Awada Kerikeri. Hausa comedy soap operas such as Karkuzu and Karambana were also quite popular in this period. Many of these television productions were later released on video and as a result, a small scale informal video trade developed.

== Decline ==
As of late 1980s, the cinema culture was beginning to face a major decline, and most Nigerian film producers had transitioned to television productions. The gradual decline of the Golden era of Nigerian cinema has been attributed to several factors, including the reduction in the value of Naira, lack of finance and marketing support, lack of standard film studios and production equipment, frequent Government structural adjustment programmes due to military dictatorships, as well as inexperience on the part of practitioners. It is also generally believed by stakeholders that the decline in this era was due to negligence as a result of the oil boom, which affected other sectors of the Nigerian economy as well.

Some researchers have also noted the decline to be as a result of increase in the ownership of television sets across the country. A survey conducted in 1974 reported that over 87 percent of Nigerians viewed about two hours of television programmes daily, across the country. However, by 1984, the television programming in the western region, which is the major area these cinemas serve, had improved tremendously and more television stations were established in the region as well, leading to a significant decline in the Nigerian cinema culture and embrace of television viewing. As at 1987, there were reportedly over 5 million registered television sets in the country, which is estimated to be much higher when unregistered sets are considered. "The oil boom [in this era] made every other household in the city centres affluent enough to own not only a television set but also a home video player." Jide Kosoko, one of the veteran actors of this era noted that when television sets and VHS players became a feature in most Nigerian homes, films produced during this era normally screen over a single weekend and are released on video the following week. He stated that it no longer made sense to view at the theatres anymore and most families would therefore rather wait a few days and get their hands on the VHS copies.

The re-emergence of the cinema culture in New Wave era has also led to another deduction that the demise of the Nigerian cinema culture was probably also due to the unfashionable appearance of most cinemas of the Golden era, as the cinema chains launched in the New Wave era were all modern with additional entertainment features apart from movie viewing.

The drastic decline in cinema culture resulted in some of the existing cinema houses being acquired by religious bodies and turned to churches; others were simply just closed down. In the early 1990s, only a few of the once vibrant cinema houses were still in operation, and all had collapsed before 1999. This development accelerated the glory days of the home video entertainment era.

== 2000s resurgence of cinemas ==
Since the early 2000s, several discussions and conferences have been held, based on how to revamp the Nigerian film industry and bring about more professionalism like it used to be in the golden era. During this time, some other filmmakers, such as Tunde Kelani and Tade Ogidan tried to make "break away" films, which were quite different from the norm. The now defunct Amstel Malta Box Office production company also made several films with the aim of making a difference. However, all of these films were also produced in the same video format that the other filmmakers used, albeit with quality stories and better directions.

Few years into the 2000s, Nigeria began to experience the growth of cinemas, which were initially structured for the middle and upper class. The Silverbird Group is the first company to launch a series of modern cinema houses across major cities in Nigeria, mostly situated in affluent areas and districts. It launched its cinema chains in 2004, starting with the Silverbird Galleria in Victoria Island, Lagos. Not long after the establishment of Silverbird cinemas, Genesis Deluxe Cinemas and Ozone Cinemas were also launched creating a competition in the cinema business. Much later, in the 2010s, FilmHouse cinemas also came into the picture, leading to a wider availability of cinemas in the country, and most importantly, availability outside the affluent neighbourhoods.

Since 2006, there have been several "Project Nollywood" funds by the Nigerian Government, provided to Nigerian filmmakers for aiding the production of high quality films, as well as to aid proper distribution infrastructure across the country. The grants have also been used to help more Nigerian filmmakers in training, funding, and also help in creating necessary infrastructure for the industry.

== Nigerian filmmakers from Golden Era ==
- Hubert Ogunde
- Moses Olaiya
- Duro Ladipo
- Ola Balogun
- Wole Amele
- Eddie Ugbomah
- Tunde Kelani
- Adeyemi Afolayan
- Ladi Ladebo
- Moses Adejumo
- Afolabi Adesanya
- U.S.A Galadima
- Isola Ogunsola
- Awada Kerikeri Organisation
- Sadiq Balewa
- Sanya Dosunmu
- Tunde Alabi-Hudeyin
- Femi Aloba
- Francis Oladele
- John Ifoghale Amata
- Jab Adu
- Kola Ogunmola

== Notable Nigerian actors from Golden Era ==
- Jide Kosoko
- Duro Ladipo
- Ishola Ogunmola
- Lere Paimo
- Oyin Adejobi
- Olu Jacobs
- Joke Silva
- Adebayo Salami
- Adebayo Faleti

== See also ==
- Cinema of Nigeria
- Media in Nigeria

== Bibliography ==
- Augustine-Ufua Enahoro (1989). "Film Makers and Film Making in Nigeria: Problems and Prospects". Africa Media Review. 3 (3). Archived from the original on 2020-11-21 – via Michigan State University Libraries, African e-Journals Project.
