= Video film era =

Period in Nigerian cinema

The video film era, also known as the home video era, is a period in Nigerian cinema, typically from the late 1980s / early 1990s to mid 2010s, when Nigerian films were made using affordable video format. The video boom era emerged after the downturn of the Golden era of the Nigerian cinema in the late 1980s. The term "home video" stems from the concept of staying at home to watch the films, in contrast to films of the Golden Age that were watched at the movie theatres.

The beginnings of the video film market in Nigeria is traced back to the 1980s when television productions thrived. Many of the television productions often found their ways into VHS, leading to the development of a small scale informal video trade. This method was adopted and built on by producers and distributors at both Idumota and Alaba Internationalemarkets to film industry which was at the time facing a major decline. The first film produced on video in Nigeria is 1988's Soso Meji, produced by Ade Ajiboye. Subsequently, Alade Aromire produced Ekun (1989) on video. However, the boom experienced in this era is generally believed to have been kick started by Kenneth Nnebue's Living in Bondage (1992), although some historians claim otherwise.

This era marked an all-time peak in the number of Nigerian film productions. As at 2004, at least four to five films were produced every day in Nigeria, and the movies already dominated television screens across the African continent and by extension, the Caribbeans and the diaspora, with the movies significantly influencing cultures in many African nations, and the film actors becoming household names across the continent. The boom also led to backlash against Nigerian films in several countries, who supposedly wanted to prevent "recolonization" by Nigeria (or "Nigerialization of Africa"). There have been reported cases of raids on shops selling Nigerian films, and governments who have introduced protectionist measures, such as introducing taxes for production houses and/or actors who want to shoot films in their countries, as well as the outright banning of Nigerian films.

In this era, Nigeria's film industry grew to become a big employer of labour in Nigeria, providing over a million jobs and contributing about 5% of the GDP. At the peak of the era at around 2008, the industry had become the second largest producer of films, releasing approximately 200 video films monthly. Copyright infringement was also at its peak, with production houses running at a loss and closing down their outfits. This development led to the need to revamp the film industry, with the birth of New Nigerian cinema.

== History ==
=== Emergence in 1990s ===
The emergence of the video film market in Nigeria is traced back to the 1980s when television productions thrived. Jimi Odumosu's Evil Encounter, a 1983 horror film released directly on television, was the first production to be a pointer to how lucrative making film directly on video can be. The film was extensively promoted before being aired on the television, and as a result, had streets flooded the following morning with video copies of the recorded broadcast. It was reported that the film became an instant hit at Alaba market, a commercial district which later became the hub of video distribution in this period and also eventually became a hub of copyright violation in Nigeria. Since Evil Encounter, it became common, especially in Southern Nigerian cities to see video copies of recorded television programmes traded on the streets.

This method was adopted and built on by producers and distributors at Alaba Market to reinvent the film industry, since the Nigerian cinema culture was facing a major decline. The first film produced on video in Nigeria was 1988's Soso Meji, produced by Ade Ajiboye. The film was also screened at the few available theatres at the time. Subsequently, Alade Aromire produced Ekun (1989) on video, which was screened at the National Theatre, Iganmu. However, the boom experienced in this era is generally believed to have been kick started by Kenneth Nnebue's Living in Bondage (1992). Nnebue had an excess number of imported video cassettes which he then used to shoot his first film on a Video camera. Although Living in Bondage is often touted in the media as the "first commercial videofilm", many historians have argued that the video film industry was already booming before Living in Bondage, therefore can't be the first commercial film. Furthermore, Nnebue, himself, had been producing Yoruba-language video films before Living in Bondage, with his first film being Aje Ni Iya Mi (1989), which was also very profitable.

Other films released in the early period of this era also include Circle of Doom (1993) and Glamour Girls (1994). Film people who pioneered this period, often called the "second generations", include Amaka Igwe, Alade Aromire, Zeb Ejiro, Chico Ejiro, The Amata brothers, Femi Lasode, Liz Benson, Kenneth Nnebue, Richard Mofe Damijo, Zack Orji, Pete Edochie, Sam Loco Efe, US Galadima, Yinka Quadri, Jide Kosoko, Omotola Jalade, Genevieve Nnaji, Kenneth Okonkwo, Kanayo O. Kanayo, Bob-Manuel Udokwu, along with others who were part of the Golden era, such as Tunde Kelani, Olu Jacobs, Joke Silva and amongst others.

In 1993, the National Film Festival was held for the first time in Nigeria, and the industry's film output score sheet recorded moderate figures of about fifty Yoruba-language films, twenty five English-language films, five Hausa-language films, and One Igbo-language film. The Nigerian Film Institute, Jos was established by the Nigerian government in November 1995 to help develop young Nigerian talents in the art of filmmaking. As at this time in 1995, 177 video films were recorded by the Nigerian Censors Board, a number which further increased to 233 in 1996. It reduced in 1997 to 214, but in 1998 increased again to 356. The number of films registered in 1999 was 389.

=== Boom of the 2000s ===
The number of Nigerian video films registered in 2000 almost doubled the 1999 value, with 712 films. It continued to further increase in 2001 through 2002, with 974 and 1,018 respectively. It then reduced once more to 761 in 2003. Number of video films from Nigeria reached all-time high in 2005, with the number of films registered reaching 1,711. Over the years, the viewership of Nigerian films spread throughout Africa, and with a massive audience in Europe, and Asia.

As at 2004, at least four to five films were produced every day in Nigeria. Nigerian movies now already dominate television screens across the African continent and by extension, the diaspora. The film actors also became household names across the continent, and the movies have significantly influenced cultures in many African nations; from way of dressing to speech and usage of Nigerian slang. This was attributed to the fact that Nigerian films told "relatable" stories, which made foreign films to gather dusts on the shelves of video stores, even though they cost much less.

This boom however also led to backlash against Nigerian films in several countries; For instance, there have been reported cases of shops selling Nigerian films being raided by the police in Ghana; according to them, "they are struggling not to be colonized by Nigerian movies". Several other governments also introduced protectionist measures, some of which include introducing taxes for production houses who want to shoot films in their countries. In July 2010, Ghana started demanding US$1,000 from visiting Nigerian actors and US$5,000 from producers and directors. The Democratic Republic of Congo had also tried to ban Nigerian films. Jean Rouch, a champion of indigenous art in Niger, compared Nollywood to AIDS. He stated that there seems to be a "Nigerianization" of Africa, worrying that the whole continent has come to "snap its fingers the Nigerian way".

According to the Filmmakers Cooperative of Nigeria, every film in Nigeria had a potential audience of 15 million people in Nigeria and about 5 million outside Nigeria. In no time, the industry became the third largest producer of films in the world. However, this didn't translate to an overtly commercial film industry when compared to other major film hubs across the world; the worth of the industry was approximated at just about US$250 million, since most of the films produced were cheaply made. The film industry regardless became a major employer in Nigeria. As at 2007, with a total number of 6,841 registered video parlours and an estimated 500,000 unregistered ones, the revenue generated by sales and rentals of movies in Lagos State alone was estimated to be ₦804 million (US$5 million) per week, which adds up to an estimated ₦33.5 billion (US$209 million) revenue for Lagos State per annum. Approximately 700,000 discs were sold in Alaba market per day, with the total sales revenue generated by the film industry in Nigeria estimated at ₦522 billion (US$3 billion) per annum, with broadcast content valued at ₦250 billion (US$1.6 billion).

=== The trend of lacking structure and professionalism ===
Nigeria's film industry became one of the biggest employers of labour in Nigeria, providing over a million jobs and contributing about 5% of the GDP. At the peak of the video era at around 2008, the industry had become the second largest producer of films, releasing approximately 200 video films monthly. However, after this point, the Nigerian film industry began to be criticized as degenerating into a "visionless" industry, with the invasion of several people without any knowledge of filmmaking.

According to director Lancelot Oduwa Imasuen, films could now be shot in four days; Chico Ejiro, who directed over 80 films in a 5-year period, was constantly reported to have bragged that he could complete production on a movie in as little as three days. "Anybody can be a film maker in today's Nollywood", filmmaker Mahmood Ali-Balogun once commented bitterly.

Several actors have noted situations where they show up on a set and the script was being written whilst they were on set, and all their scenes shot in one day. Also, actors have confirmed usual scenarios of having to wear their own clothes and do their own make up for film shoots. It was reported that star actors, who often work on several films at the same time, as a result won't show up when they're supposed to. Oftentimes, shooting is also delayed by local thugs, who extort money for "protection" before they would allow filming to take place in their "territories". The industry was also criticized in this era for its themes, which often included witchcraft and black magic.

The UNESCO, which had previously ranked the industry as the second largest film producer in its 2008 report on the global film business, refused to feature Nigerian films in its next report, as it considered the films "semi-professional/informal productions".

=== Decline ===
After the peak in the production of films in 2005 through 2008, the numbers have been on steady decline. The decline of this mode of filmmaking has been attributed to high levels of copyright infringement, which deterred investment in video films. According to the World Bank, approximately 90 percent of the DVDs circulating Nigeria are illegal copies, with new releases enjoying just about a two-week window, known as "Mating season", before their unlicensed versions become massively available in the market.

Filmmaker Amaka Igwe also once stated that "piracy makes up 82 per cent of the Nigerian market," a problem she attributed to the inability of film distributors to understand the concept of market demand and supply. Leila Djansi also noted that distributors sometimes are in fact the major kingpins of infringement; citing situations where distributors lock up copies of the original DVDs in their shops and instead sell unauthorized copies produced by the distributors to make money for themselves, while they tell the filmmakers that their films are "not selling" and that they can come pick them up whenever they want to.

However, this was not limited to just DVDs, as there also became a major increase in television networks, who began to show independently produced Nigerian films without any permission from the filmmakers. As a result of this, most investors of the "Alaba cartel", who control almost 90 percent stakes in the video industry, began to channel their money into other business ventures instead. The decline in this era has also been blamed on the refusal of the Government to provide support and funding, the lack of a formal and effective indigenous film distribution infrastructure, as well as, the increase in the cost of production in Nigeria.

== Production ==
Videofilms in this era were produced on very low budgets and do not pass through the traditional theatrical run, as they were shot using cheap video cameras without the required cinematic quality, and edited with basic VCR machines. These films are usually funded by marketers who act as the executive producers for the films; these marketers often have control on crucial areas of production, such as casting, and they make sure the films are made in a way they believe would attract the right audience and thereby recoup investments.

The films are usually produced and shot on location all over Nigeria with hotels, homes, and offices often rented out by their owners and appearing in the credits. The most popular filming locations are the cities of Lagos, Enugu, Abuja and Asaba. However, most major Nigerian cities are used for video productions, owing to the various regional industries that are present in the country. in about two to three weeks,

== Distribution ==
Upon completion, the videofilms are released directly on video (known as "Home videos"); they are replicated into about 200,000 copies of video cassettes (and later VCDs and DVDs), and then distributed to markets, video clubs and eventually various homes. Most of the financiers are based in a vast, chaotic market called Idumota in Lagos, while the films are distributed widely in Alaba, another market in Ojo. Other distribution centres for Home videos across the country include Iweka Road in Onitsha, Anambra, and Pound Road in Aba, Abia. The video producers turned out movies at an astonishing rate in a year and new titles were delivered to Nigerian shops and market stalls every week, where an average video sold 50,000 copies. A hit might sell several hundred thousand.

== Genres and themes ==
Movies in this era are mostly of the romance, drama, comedy and supernatural genres, and also a few actions. Themes explored include: revenge, betrayal, love, hatred, ritual, politics and so on. They often have themes that deal with the moral dilemmas facing modern humans. Felix Muchimba states: "the stories tend to be rather plain although very dramatic and full with emotions: the women wail and are covetous money lovers; the men are just as emotional and very revengeful".

Most of the videofilms also have a supernatural and religious theme including black magic (Juju) and the clash of modern religion with a traditional religion. Juju is a cult that is consulted for one reason or another when in need, typically psycho-medical, buttressed with the power of the supernatural. Some movies promote the Christian or Islamic faiths, and some movies are overtly evangelical. Others, however, also address questions of religious diversity.

Other themes usually depicted in these films include: violent robbery, ritual performances, rivalry, conflicts, sexual violence, organized crime, prostitution, murder, greed, avarice, impatience, jealously, envy, pride, arrogance, infidelity, treachery, occultism, amongst others. Stories in these films were "rehashed from the bowel of the Nigerian society, [as] a good number emanate from our belief systems and our tendency to attribute most things to, not ill-luck or any fault of our own but the evil machinations of wicked people. Many others focus on the get rich schemes of people today and its evil concomitants. Yet others portray the good life of ordinary Nigerians, their love and romance as well as their disappointments and pains".

== Criticisms ==
While some praised this era of Nigerian cinema for establishing the Nigerian film industry as a viable industry, some others described it as one of the worst things to have ever happened to the Nigerian film industry, as it was an era when there was total lack of vision, standards and professionalism amongst practitioners, most of whom had no formal training in filmmaking.

One of the major criticism the Nigerian film industry received during this era is the abysmal portrayal of black magic and witch craft, thereby giving other people a skewed impression about Nigeria and to a large extent, Africa. Cultural critics have often complained about "macabre scenes full of sorcery" in the films. Jean Rouch, an Arts personality from Niger described Nigerian directors and producers as voodoo priests casting malign spells over audiences in other countries, and gaining more audience as a result.

The industry was also criticized for promoting lawlessness and upholding of immorality; some of the visual images depicted in 18-rated films include: sexual activities, nudity, obscenity, vulgar language (cursing), indecent dressing, murder, rape, domestic violence (especially against women), smoking, molestation and harassment. These have been argued to be injurious to the youths and the society at large.

== See also ==
- Cinema of Nigeria
- Media in Nigeria
