= Countdown at Kusini =

1976 Nigerian-American film

- Film poster
- Directed by: Ossie Davis
- Written by: Ossie Davis; Al Freeman Jr. Ladi Ladebo; John Storm Robert
- Produced by: Ladi Ladebo
- Starring: Ruby Dee; Ossie Davis; Greg Morris
- Cinematography: Andrew Laszlo
- Edited by: George Bowers
- Music by: Manu Dibango
- Production companies: DST Telecommunications] Nigeria Glipp Productions; Tam International Limited
- Distributed by: Columbia Pictures
- Release date: April 7, 1976
- Running time: 101 minutes
- Countries: Nigeria; United States
- Language: English
- Budget: $1.2 million

Countdown at Kusini (also known as Cool Red) is a 1976 American-Nigerian action-drama film written by Howard Friedlander and Ed Spielman and directed by Ossie Davis.

== Synopsis ==
During a trip to the newly independent nation of Fahari, Africa, Red Salter, an African American jazz musician, falls in love with Leah Matanzima, but she is involved in Fahari's struggle against a puppet government run by multinational corporations. Jealous of Leah's friendship with white British journalist Charles Henderson, Red reluctantly joins her support of revolutionary leader Ernest Motapo and helps her obtain guns from weapons dealer Saidu. When Fahari officials arrest them, Charles rescues Leah and Red; then spirits them away in a motorboat, but Ben Amed, a French mercenary hired to assassinate Motapo, rams them with another boat and kills Charles. Marnie (Yola), Motapo's traitorous nephew, arranges with Amed to ambush Motapo at a railroad junction near Kusini, but Leah and Red arrive in time with revolutionary fighters. After killing Marnie and Amed, Leah welcomes Red to Africa's revolution against European imperialism.

== Cast ==
- Ruby Dee - Leah Matanzima
- Ossie Davis - Ernest Motapo
- Greg Morris - Red Salter
- Tom Aldredge - Ben Amed
- Michael Ebert - Charles Henderson
- Thomas Baptiste - John Okello
- Jab Adu - Juma Bakari
- Elsie Olusola - Mamouda
- Oba Funsho Adeolu - Marni
- Ibidun Allison - Sniper

== Production ==
The film was conceived and entirely financed by Delta Sigma Theta, an African-American sorority that owned DST Telecommunications, which produced material to counter the "inaccurate portrayal of Black people in media".

Filming took place in August 1974 in Lagos, Nigeria with both U.S. and Nigerian crews.

Dee, Davis, and Morris deferred their salaries until the film made a profit.
