= Charlotte Video Project =

The Charlotte Video Project (CVP) is a web series about Charlotte, North Carolina, produced during the 18 months prior to Charlotte hosting the Democratic National Convention in 2012. The project comprises 100 non-fiction videos and is distributed over the Internet.

== History ==
Charlotte natives Scott Lazes and Kevin Beaty created the CVP after graduating from college in May 2011, majoring in journalism and film studies at Rutgers University and Film Production at Boston University, respectively. Lazes initially conceived the project in his dorm room at Demarest Hall after First Lady Michelle Obama announced that Charlotte would be the host city for the 2012 Democratic National Convention.

While he was a resident assistant his senior year at Rutgers, Lazes learned about the concept of intentional community—that community members are responsible for improving the cohesiveness and visibility of their communities, which became a key element of the CVP. Considering the historic nature of this event and the media attention it would generate, Lazes began brainstorming ideas with Beaty on how they could apply the video production skills they learned in college to showcase the various artistic, cultural and professional communities within Charlotte before the DNC, and thus help create a more intentional community in Charlotte. Initially calling it the Charlotte Video Encyclopedia, Lazes and Beaty began working on the CVP just after they returned to Charlotte in May 2011. They also covered the convention itself, uploading videos of the transformation of Charlotte to accommodate the citywide event.

== Style ==
The initial style of the CVP followed a strict direct cinema filmmaking approach because of a mistake that happened during the pilot video segment. The story was about a farm-to-table relationship between Harvest Moon Grille in Charlotte and Grateful Growers Farm in Denver, North Carolina. The video featured executive chef of Harvest Moon Grille Cassie Parsons and Natalie Veres, owner of Grateful Growers Farm. The audio from the interview that Lazes and Beaty recorded with Parsons and Veres was unusable, so they edited the video without an interview. The result was a voyeuristic, visually rich narrative that played in what some considered an avant-garde fashion. Lazes and Beaty, though, enjoyed the outcome and continued with a direct-cinema approach for the first trimester of the project.

The CVP diverged from its direct cinema beginnings and experimented with other approaches to video production as well, specifically live performance recording, as exercised in the 'Body & Voice' video series.
