= Auteuring Nollywood =

Book detailing the scholarly analysis of events in the 2009 film The Figurine

Auteuring Nollywood: Critical Perspectives on The Figurine
- Book cover
- Language: English
- Genre: Essay
- Publisher: University Press plc
- Publication date: 31 July 2014
- Publication place: Nigeria
- Media type: Print
- Pages: 455

Auteuring Nollywood: Critical Perspectives on The Figurine is a book released on 31 July 2014, detailing the scholarly analysis of events in the 2009 film The Figurine directed by Kunle Afolayan. The book is the first book in the history of Nigerian Cinema to be devoted to the work of a single Nigerian film director and it contains scholarly essays, which explores "the thematic focus and cinematic style employed in The Figurine". It also contains interviews with the cast and crew of the film and insights into the African and Nigerian film industry. Since its release, the book has been getting rave reviews from critics, educators and film scholars.

== Development and overview ==
Auteuring Nollywood is a 455-page book and it contains a "collection of scholarly essays," interrogating "the thematic focus and cinematic style employed in The Figurine"; it also provides series of interviews with the key actors and technicians that featured in the film, and explores the trends in the New Nigerian Cinema.

The idea of a book adaptation of The Figurine was originally the idea of Shina Afolayan, who is a Scholar in the department of Philosophy, University of Ibadan. He gave birth to the idea when the film was still in production; after seeing a rough cut of the film, he was very impressed with what he saw that he had to interview Kunle Afolayan, along with the other cast and crew of the film at the time. The idea was not taken seriously, until film scholars in other countries also got keen on writing on the film. The book's content was contributed by a number of scholars from various educational institutions, including: Sola Osofisan, Dele Layiwola, Chukwuma Okoye, Jane Thorburn, Matthew H. Brown, Gideon Tanimonure, A.G.A Bello, Foluke Ogunleye and Hyginus Ekwuazi. Foreword was written by Professor Jonathan Haynes of the Long Island University, an Afterword on "Neo-Nollywood and its Other" by Onookome Okome and the book as a whole was edited by Adeshina Afolayan. The book is packaged and published by Relentless Media, in conjunction with Golden Effects Services.

== Release ==
Auteuring Nollywood was launched on 31 July 2014 at the Agip Recital Hall of the Muson Centre, Lagos. The event was attended by several political and film stakeholders, including Peace Anyim-Osigwe, the former C.E.O of Africa Film Academy, Governor of Kwara State: Governor Abdulfatah Ahmed (represented by Prince Deji Oni), Speaker of the Lagos State House of Assembly: Honourable Adeyemi Ikuforiji, Corporate Affairs Adviser of Nigerian Breweries: Kufre Ekanem, Nigerian Guild of Editors: Mr. Femi Adeshina, Chairman of Doyin Group of Companies: Chief Samuel Adedoyin, and the event was chaired by Rasheed Gbadamosi, former Nigerian Minister for National Planning. Other notable people at the event include: Chief Tunde Oloyede, Tunde Kelani, Mahmood Ali-Balogun, Yomi Fash Lanso, Ohaneze Ndi Igbo Nollywood, Gabriel Afolayan, Shina Afolayan, media mogul Dayo Adeneye, designer Deola Sagoe, Kenny Saint Brown, talking Drummer: Ara and comedians such as Ali Baba, Julius Agwu, Teju Babyface, Princess and Kofi. Comedian Gbenga Adeyinka was the Host of the event. Some challenges facing the film industry was also discussed at the event as well.

== Reception ==
The book has been met with positive reception since its release. Ikechukwu Obiaya, the director of Nollywood Study Centre, Pan-African University, commends the quality of the book and stated: "This is a highly impressive book. Hope it will be the first of many more to come of Kunle Afolayan's works". He also comments that the book reveals interesting perspectives into "artistic" life of the filmmaker, Kunle Afolayan. Nduka Otiono of Association of Nigerian Authors (ANA), and African Studies, Carlton University stated: "this book is seminal in its inauguration of a new chapter in the study of Nigeria's phenomenal contribution to global film culture," "it makes a strong case for a more in-depth artistic and critical approach to the study of Nollywood that triangulates around orality". Akin Adesokan of the Indiana University comments that the book is: "comprehensive and informed about its subject and in unexpected ways gives solidity to the characterization of Nollywood as 'telling our own stories'". Steve Ayorinde of Relentless Media, commended that Auteuring Nollywood arrived "at a time that the Nigerian film industry is opening up to the Academy Awards and is also being duly acknowledged as a major contributor to the Nigerian economy". He commented that the book is "championing a new and positive development in cinematic and literary studies in Nigeria by focusing exclusively on the work of a single cineaste while also expanding the narrative around a film industry that continues to announce its arrival on the global scene in a spectacular way".

The director of the original film, Kunle Afolayan revealed that after reading a copy of the book, he shed tears of joy, "because this is about me and my work, and because I have never read a book so detailed in its analysis". He also commented: "Releasing one's movie to scholarly interrogation like this is one of the next levels for our film industry to climb and I'm excited that this is already happening through my film". Peace Anyiam-Osigwe of Africa Film Academy comments that: "AMAA is proud to be associated with this project because it serves an important purpose," "It is significant to see that five years after The Figurine won AMAA's top award as Best Film, the film is still being discussed and has earned a rich collection of academic essays that are as important to the film as they are to the entire industry". Danjuma Dadu of Nigerian Film Corporation stated: "Auteuring Nollywood was a welcome addition to the body of knowledge on film discourse in Nigeria and that the Film Corporation is proud to be associated with it".
