= Ladi Ladebo =

Nigerian filmmaker (1942–2021)

- Born: Raymond Oladipupo Ladebo; 7 May 1942; Ijebu-Ode, Ogu, Nigeria
- Died: 16 April 2021 (aged 78); London, England
- Other name: Uncle Ladi
- Education: Bowling Green State University; New York University Graduate School of Business
- Occupations: film director, writer and producer
- Known for: Countdown at Kusini

Raymond Oladipupo Ladebo also simply known by his stage name Ladi Ladebo (7 May 1942 – 16 April 2021) was a Nigerian filmmaker. He was one of the pioneers of Golden Age of yesteryear Nigerian cinema, especially during the celluloid-era optimism of the 1970s. He previously worked as a media analyst and accountant before entering the film industry. He was also popularly called by his nickname as Uncle Ladi.

== Career ==
After completing his secondary education in Nigeria, Ladi went to the US to pursue his higher education. He obtained his marketing and business degrees from the universities in the USA. He first went to Bowling Green State University in Ohio and obtained his B.S. in Business Administration in 1968. In August 1969, he received his MBA degree in Marketing from the New York University Graduate School of Business.

He made his entry into the film industry through advertising. He worked as a media analyst and executive accountant for the international advertising agency Ogilvy and Mather for a duration of three years between 1969 and 1972. His experience working for an international advertising agency earned him the opportunity of working as a production assistant on American feature films and also as a line producer for American television programs.

He began collaborating with veteran African-American actor Ossie Davis in films. He wrote the screenplay and was the producer of the 1976 American film Countdown at Kusini, which was directed by Ossie Davis. Countdown at Kusini was regarded as the first film to be made by Black Americans. It also marked the first collaboration between Ossie Davis and Ladi Ladebo in films. He also directed a few films, including Bisi, Daughter of the River (1977) and Silent Sufferer, which was a collaboration with UNESCO and UNPFA. He began making advocacy films post 1977, often collaborating with funder organisations such as UNESCO and UNPFA.

Ladebo also produced films, and his notable film as producer, Vendor, which was released in 1992, garnered four awards, including Best Director and Best Feature Film during the inaugural edition of the Nigerian Film Festival in 1992. His last directorial film Heritage was released in 2003, and it also had its UK premiere in 2004 at the Khalili Theatre of the School of Oriental and African Studies.

He also produced television programs, and his television serial production Thrift Collector was one of three productions selected by the Rotterdam Museum of Ethnology as Best TV Soaps on Population and Development.

== Death ==
Ladebo died on 16 April 2021 at the age of 78 in London.
