= Wetin Dey (TV series) =

Nigerian TV series (2007–2008)

- Directed by: Kenneth Gyang
- Country of origin: Nigeria
- Original languages: English, Nigerian Pidgin

Production
- Production company: British Broadcasting Corporation

Original release
- Network: Nigerian Television Authority
- Release: 11 April 2007 – 2008

Wetin Dey is a Nigerian television drama series that aired on the Nigerian Television Authority. The show first aired on April 11, 2007. It was produced by the BBC World Service Trust (now BBC Media Action) as part of an initiative to promote awareness of social issues such as HIV/AIDS, sexual and reproductive health, corruption, and youth empowerment.

== Plot summary ==
The series follows the lives of several young Nigerians as they navigate various challenges, including relationships, health concerns, and societal pressures. Through engaging storytelling, Wetin Dey aims to educate its audience about the importance of safe sexual practices and HIV/AIDS prevention.

== Cast and production ==
The series was directed by Kenneth Gyang, and it featured an ensemble cast, including several rising and established Nigerian actors. The production was handled by the BBC World Service Trust.

- Boma Ilamina-Eremie as Chike
- Funlola Aofiyebi-Raimi as Dr. Grace
- Vanessa Nzediegwu as Eleja
- Ali Nuhu as Ibrahim
- Akume Akume as Habib
- Azizat Sadiq as Aisha
- Kayode Aiyegbusi as Senator
- Rekiya Attah as Hajia
- Edward Agbo Madaki as Hakeem
- Iyke Okechukwu as Bayo
- Jab Adu as Samuel
- Grace Awe as Hajia Zara
- Joe Adekwagh as Alhaji
- Robert Loner as Usman
- Kalbang Afsa Clement as Halima
- Seun Dada as Yetunde
- Lola Ajibade as Precious
- Magaji Mijiwana as Imam

== Episodes and impact ==
Wetin Dey aired on Nigeria Television Authority, reaching a wide audience across Nigeria. The show ran for one season, consisting of thirteen episodes. Each episode was approximately 30 minutes long and was broadcast weekly. The series was part of a broader BBC Media Action effort to use television as a tool for public education and engagement. Wetin Dey has been known for its educational content and its ability to address sensitive topics in a relatable and engaging manner. The show has been recognized for its contributions to HIV/AIDS awareness and sexual health education among Nigerian youth.
