= TvNolly =

Online video streaming platform

- TvNolly
- Company type: Video streaming
- Industry: Internet
- Founder: Adeniyi Olutayo
- Headquarters: Ikeja, Lagos State, Nigeria
- Number of locations: Ghana; Nigeria; United Kingdom; United States; Canada; Australia; China
- Key people: Adeniyi Olutayo (founder and CEO)
- Services: Video streaming, video editing, video production, information and communications technology
- Website: www.tvnolly.com

The name TvNolly is a coinage from the words "television" and "Nollywood", the nickname of the movie industry in Nigeria.

== Overview ==
TvNolly was started in January 2012 by Olutayo Adeniyi. It is an online video streaming platform that provides free movies to internet end-users and consumers around the globe. It streams Nigerian, Ghanaian and other African movies.

The site had 80,934 subscribers on its Facebook fan page as of 29 September 2014. According to Alexa.com, tvnolly.com ranks 1,687,251 globally and is not currently among the first 500 highly rated sites in Nigeria. Its YouTube page had 175, 179 subscribers and 17,627,516 views as of September 2014.

== History ==
In 2012, TvNolly started free web streaming of Nigerian, Ghanaian, and other African movies.

TvNolly is as an offshoot of Nultan Nigeria Ltd, a technology company specializing in Internet-related services and products across video, e-commerce, enterprise, web, mobile, animation, cloud computing, software and online advertising technologies. The company has locations in Lagos, London, Ghana, the United States and Canada.

== About ==
TvNolly has a database of African films, mostly Nigerian (in Yoruba and English) and Ghanaian (English, Twi and Gha).

Visitors to the site are not charged a fee to watch movies, as on the Iroko or Ibaka video websites. Nor do they need to register. They can stream movies live over any internet powered device.

TvNolly works with Nollywood's top film production houses and purchases the exclusive online licenses to their films.

TvNolly purchase copyrights from African movie producers, directors or any creative contents properly registered for a period of time (based on agreements between both parties) and gain exclusive rights to stream such video to its global audience for the period agreed upon.

TvNolly's audience are predominantly in the diaspora, with the top five countries being the United States, United Kingdom, Canada, Germany and France.

TvNolly’s primary existence is to provide the top free on-demand video streaming service of Nigerian and African movies and TV shows to viewers across internet platforms.
