= Chineze Anyaene =

Nigerian filmmaker and film producer

- Born: 28 December 1983 (age 42); Abuja, Nigeria.
- Citizenship: Nigerian
- Education: University of Abuja, Nigeria. New York Film Academy
- Occupations: filmmaker and film producer.
- Known for: Ijé: The Journey
- Spouse: Mr. Chibuzor Abonyi

Chineze Anyaene // (born 28 December 1983) is a Nigerian filmmaker and film producer. She is best known for her critically acclaimed picture, Ijé: The Journey (2010).

== Early life and education ==
Anyaene was born and raised in Abuja, Nigeria. She obtained her B. A. in Theatre Art from the University of Abuja. In 2005, she moved to the United States where she obtained a master's degree in Directing at the New York Film Academy (NYFA). She married Chibuzor Abonyi in 2017.

== Career ==
Anyaene makes use of cinematic interpretation for her passion for telling stories. She is the founder/CEO of Xandria Productions, a studio that specializes in the production, acquisition, marketing, and distribution of theatrical motion pictures in Africa and the international film market. Xandria Productions' feature film debut "Ije: The Journey" in 2010 was produced and directed by Chineze Anyaene starring Omotola Jalade-Ekeinde and Genevieve Nnaji with a production sponsorship from Kodak. Ije tells the story of two Nigerian sisters, Chioma and Anya, and how Chioma travels to the US to help save her sister from being convicted of murder. The critically acclaimed picture was shot in Nigeria and the United States as the first feature film to be made by a student of the New York Film Academy; "Ije: The Journey" traveled around film festivals across the globe, won prestigious awards, and then became a Nigerian box office hit and instant classic as well as contributed to the revolution of Nigerian cinema. The money spent on producing Ije is up to 2.5 million dollars.

In 2012, Anyaene produced a short film, 20 Years Later, directed by Larry Ulrich and starring Jeff Handy, Chris Oliver, and Angel Princess. Due to the production costs of Ijé: The Journey, as of 2013 she was still out of pocket and unable to get the funding to make another feature present at present.

Chineze was a Speaker at the 14th Edition of African Business Club, Harvard Business School, on the subject ‘Entertainment: A Nexus of the Movie and Music Industries in Africa. African Business Club is the World's largest student-run event focused on business in Africa. It brings together over 900 participants, business professionals from around the world whilst providing an exceptional networking opportunity for business and community leaders, corporate, sponsors, current and prospective Harvard MBA students and alumni, students from other programs, and educators from around the world. The theme of the 14th edition of which Chineze was also a participant was Africa Incorporated: Cultivating an Integrated Market

Chineze Anyaene led a delegation with Tope Oshin Ogun, Ramsey Nouah, and Charles Novia to represent Nigeria's movie industry at the World Economic Forum held in Abuja in 2014 as a panel to discuss Nollywood and its prospects

Chineze is also consulting producer for a brand that comprises 7 channels on Sub-Saharan African direct broadcast satellite service.

=== Nigerian Oscar Selection Committee (NOSC) ===
Chineze Anyaene constituted the Nigerian Oscar Selection Committee (NOSC) and received approval from the Academy of Motion Picture Arts and Sciences in 2012 as the Nigerian organization approved to submit and represent the country's feature film entry in International Feature Film (IFF) category; the committee for which she was chairperson was approved for a running tenure of 5 years.

The re-committee was re-approved in 2019 by the Academy of Motion Picture Arts and Sciences Awards with her still as Chairperson of the 12-man committee. In 2019 the committee submitted the Nigerian first entry for the Oscars for the Best International Feature Film category formerly called the Best Foreign language category

== Awards ==
Notable awards won are:

Award of Excellence at the Canada International Film Festival,

The Golden Ace Award at the Las Vegas International Film Festival,

The Silver Palm Award at the Mexico International Film Festival,

The Melvin van Peebles Award at the San Francisco Black Festival, and the Festival Prize for Best International Student at Swansea Bay Film Festival, awarded by Catherine Zeta-Jones and Michael Sheen.

== See also ==
- List of Nigerian film producers
