= Jab Adu =

Nigerian actor and producer

- Born: Joseph Abiodun Babajide; 28 December 1932; Calabar
- Died: 2016 (aged 83–84)
- Citizenship: Nigerian
- Education: St. Gregory's College
- Occupations: Actor; Producer
- Notable work: The Village Headmaster; Saworoide

Jab Adu (December 28, 1932 - February 28, 2016), born Joseph Abiodun Babajide, was an actor and producer from Nigeria. He directed the 1977 Nigerian film Bisi, Daughter of the River, the highest grossing film in Nigeria for several decades. He was among the pioneers of Nigerian filmmaking.

He was born in Calabar. From 1941 until 1946, he studied at St. Gregory's College in the Obalende neighborhood of Lagos.

== Filmography ==
=== Actor ===
- Countdown at Kusini (1976) as Juma Bukari
- Hostages (1996)
- Saworoide (1999) as Lagbayi
- Wetin Dey (2007-2008 TV Series) as Samuel
- The Village Headmaster (1968 - 1988), a soap opera, as Bassey Okon

=== Director ===
- Bisi, Daughter of the River (1977)
