= Kenneth Nnebue =

Nigerian film producer

- Citizenship: Nigeria
- Occupations: Actor, Film director, Screenwriter

Kenneth Nnebue MFR is a Nigerian film producer and director known for pioneering the use of VHS in producing films. He produced and co-directed Nigeria's first feature film, Living in Bondage (1992). The film was shot straight-to-video, and starred Kenneth Okonkwo and Nnenna Nwabueze in their breakout roles. Nnebue had an excess number of imported video cassettes, which he then used to shoot his first film on a video camera. It is regarded as the first Nigerian home video which achieved blockbuster success. Nnebue had been producing Yoruba-language video films prior to Living in Bondage, with his first film being Aje Ni Iya Mi (1989), which was also very profitable. He has been referred to as the founding father of Nollywood, Nigeria's film industry.

Nnebue was awarded the Member of the Order of the Federal Republic honor on 29 September 2014 by the Federal Government of Nigeria alongside Joke Silva and Omotola Jalade Ekeinde.

== Filmography ==
- Aje Ni Iya Mi (1989)
- Living in Bondage (1992)
- Dirty Deal (1993)
- Glamour Girls (1994)
- True Confession (1995)
- Died Wretched (1998)
- Lost to Lust (2005)
- The Maid
