= Fincho =

1957 Nigerian film

- Directed by: Sam Zebba
- Cinematography: 16mm colour film
- Music by: Alexander Laszlo
- Release date: 1957
- Running time: 76 minutes

Fincho is a 1957 Nigerian film by Sam Zebba, and the first Nigerian film to be shot in colour. The film deals with the titular character's attempts to make sense of the industrialization brought to Nigeria by European colonialists, the tension between tradition and innovation, and mechanization's threat to traditional labour.

According to Zebba's self-published autobiography, the film was shot with Nigerian non-professional actors, and Pidgin dialogue dubbed by Nigerian students at the University of California, Los Angeles. The director contacted singer Harry Belafonte, who agreed to record an introduction for the film. The score was written by Alexander Laszlo, including the theme Fincho Song - for which Sid Robin wrote lyrics, and Zebba sang accompanied by a small Mexican band.
