= Alaba International Market =

Market in Lagos, Nigeria

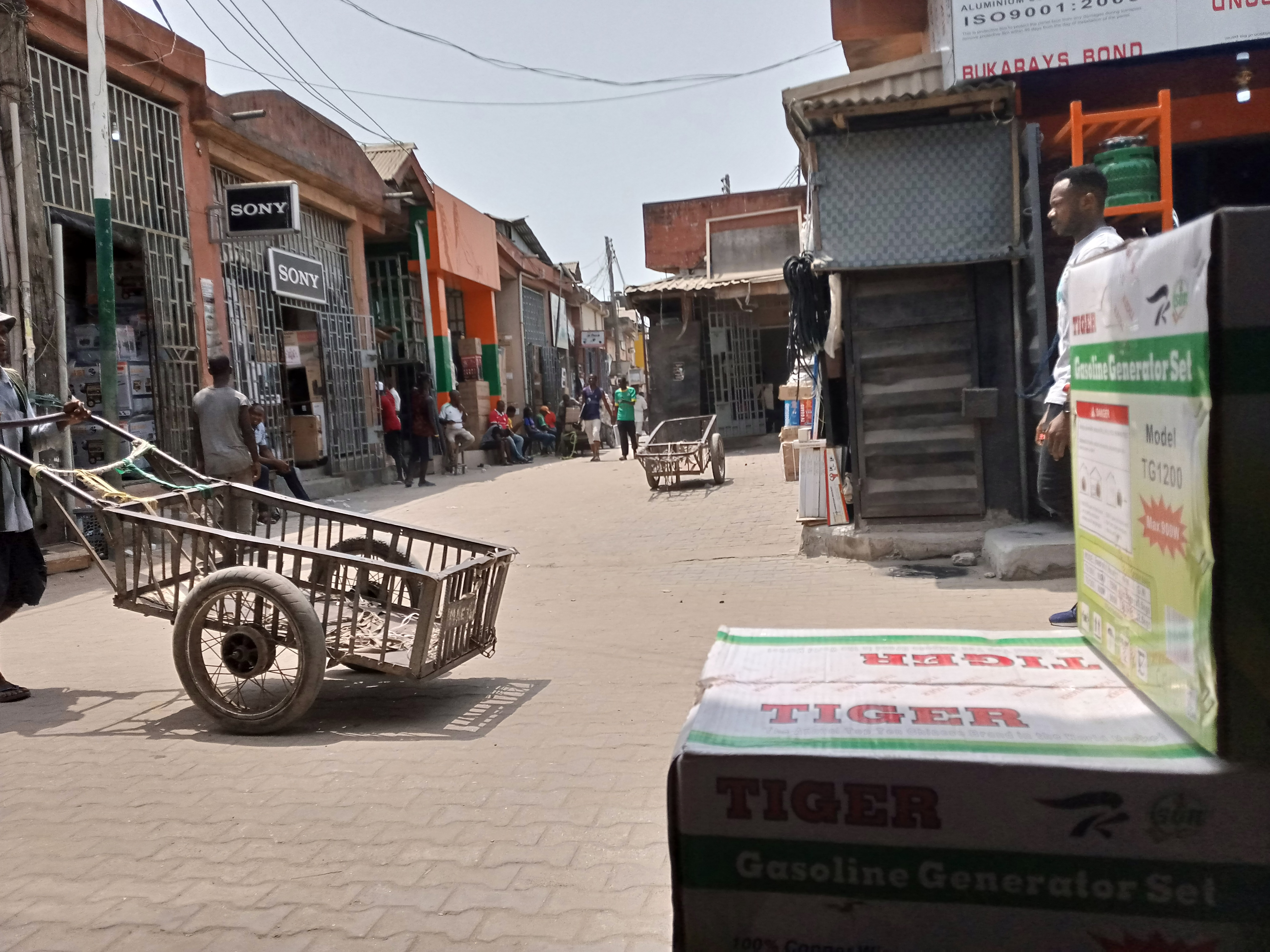
Ojo Alaba international market Lagos Electronics section

Alaba international market is an electronics market located in Ojo, Lagos State, Nigeria. It is the largest electronics market in Nigeria. Apart from the sales of electronic products, the market also deals in the repair of home appliances.

In October 2022, violent clashes broke out at the market.

In June 2023, it was announced that a number of structurally defective buildings would be demolished. The Lagos State Building Control Agency (LASBCA) identified 17 buildings as "beyond redemption".

== See also ==
- List of markets in Lagos
