= Irapada =

- Directed by: Kunle Afolayan
- Written by: Kunle Afolayan, John Izuchukwu and Jide Okeke
- Starring: Kunle Afolayan; Deola Oloyede; Jotham Ayuba; Angela Phillips; Laide Adewale; Joe Adekwagh; Kunle Coke; Peter Fatomilola
- Release date: 2006
- Running time: 2 hours
- Country: Nigeria
- Language: English Pidgin Yoruba
- Box office: ₦5,000,000 (domestic gross)

Irapada (English: Redemption) is a 2006 Nigerian supernatural thriller film, produced and directed by Kunle Afolayan and Written by Kunle Afolayan, John Izuchukwu and Jide Okeke

. In 2007 It won the Africa Movie Academy Award for Best Film in an African Language. It was also featured as one of the Must See African Films of the 21st century on CNN African Voices in 2013. It was released on DVD in July 2008.

== Cast ==
- Kunle Afolayan as Dewunmi
- Deola Oloyede as Moji
- Jotham Ayuba as Shehu
- Angela Phillips as Amaka
- Toun Oni as Foster Mother
- Laide Adewale as Foster Uncle
- Joe Adekwagh as Alhaji
- Kunle Coker as Kazeem
- Peter Fatomilola as Soothsayer
- The writer of the movie is Jude Okeke.
