= Silverbird Galleria =

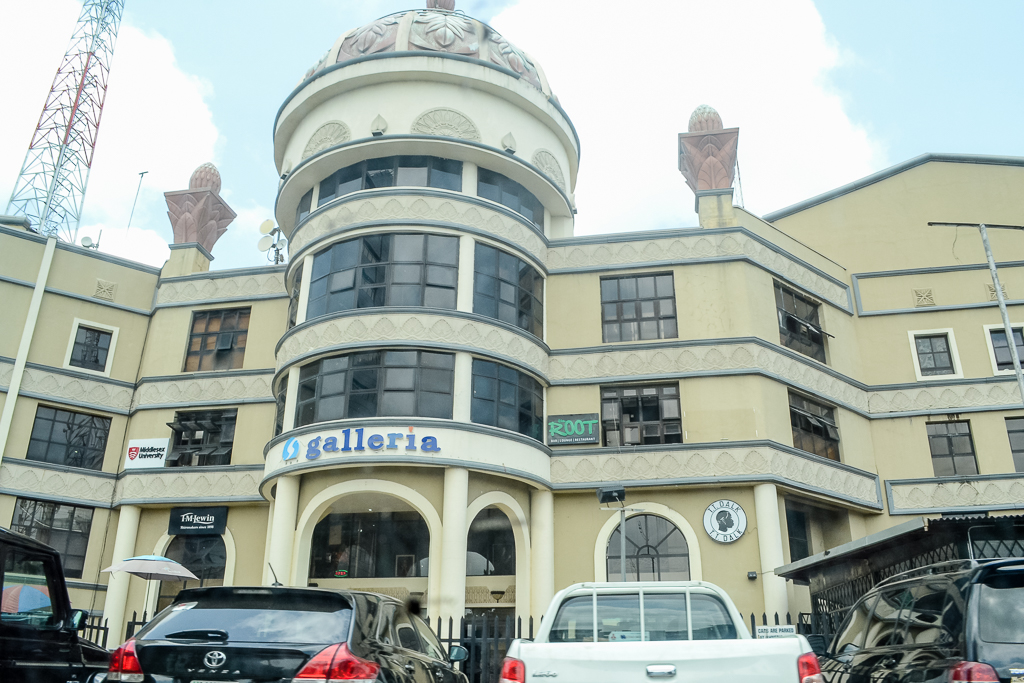
- Location: Lagos, Lagos State, Nigeria
- Coordinates: 6.4299574°N 3.4089365°W
- Address: 133, Ahmadu Bello Way, Victoria Island
- Opened: 2004
- Developer: Silverbird Group
- Floors: 4 floors
- Website: silverbirdgroup.com

Silverbird Galleria is a shopping mall and entertainment centre in Victoria Island, Lagos.

== History ==
Silverbird Galleria was established in 2004 by Silverbird Group, a media and real estate company founded by Ben Murray-Bruce in the 1980s. The movie theatre, Silverbird Cinemas which revolutionalized cinema in Nigeria pioneered the first five-screens Cineplex in sub-Saharan Africa. Silverbird Cinemas also possesses the largest cinema chain in West Africa with several locations in Lagos, Abuja, Port Harcourt, Uyo and Accra, Ghana.

== The Lagos Galleria ==
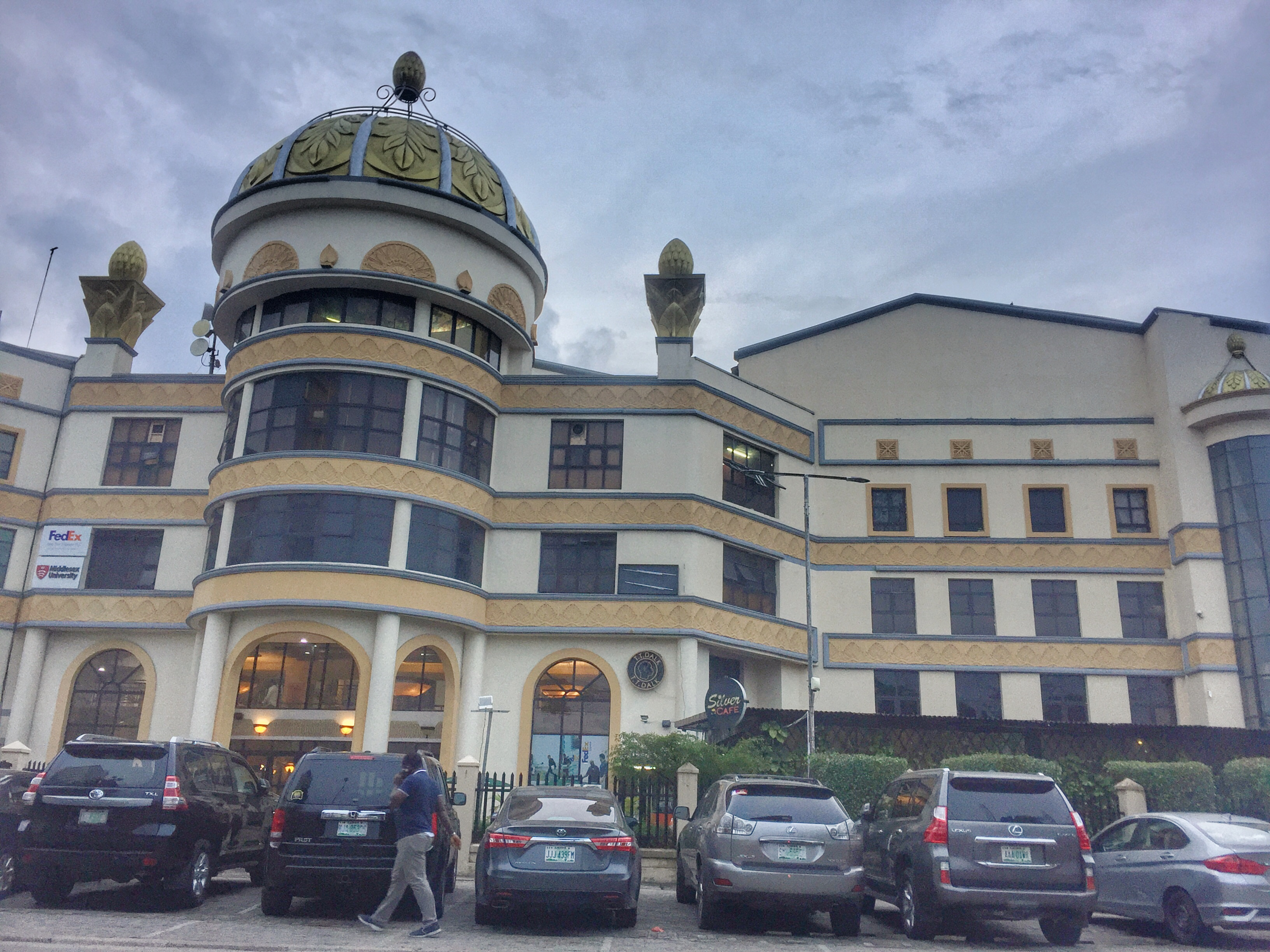
Cinema

Silverbird Galleria has a shirts retailer, café and mobile network offices for feasible communication and internet access, all located on the ground floor. Electronic gadgets retailers and the Rhythm 93.7 FM broadcasting studio (operated by Silverbird) are on the first floor. The second floor has arcades and food services. The Silverbird Cinema is on the third and topmost floor. Additional services include a pharmacy, lounge and beauty shop. There is also a Silverbird galleria located at Ikeja CityMall, Lagos. It is at the top of the escalators on the right.

== Facility locations ==
The Galleria has sister locations in other parts of Nigeria and internationally:

- The 12-screen/Silverbird Entertainment Centre, Abuja, arguably West Africa's largest Cinema complex;
- An 8-screen/Silverbird Showtime, Port Harcourt;
- A Silverbird 6-screen cinema and lifestyle store in Accra Mall, Ghana;
- A 4-screen cinema in Nairobi, Kenya.
