= Ijé =

2010 film by Chineze Anyaene

- Theatrical poster
- Directed by: Chineze Anyaene
- Written by: Samuel Tilsen; Chineze Anyaene
- Produced by: Paula Moreno; Chineze Anyaene
- Starring: Genevieve Nnaji; Odalys García; Omotola Jalade-Ekeinde; Jeff Swarthout; Clem Ohameze; Ulrich Que
- Cinematography: Keith L. Smith
- Edited by: Eric R. Brodeur; Youssef Delara
- Music by: Reuel Meditz
- Production company: Xandria Productions
- Distributed by: Xandria Distributions
- Release dates: April 1, 2010 (United States); July 30, 2010 (Nigeria)
- Running time: 107 minutes
- Countries: Nigeria; United States
- Languages: English; Yoruba; Igbo
- Budget: $2.5 million

Ijé or Ijé: The Journey is a 2010 Nigerian drama film directed by Chineze Anyaene and starring Omotola Jalade-Ekeinde, Genevieve Nnaji, and Odalys García.

== Plot ==
Chioma (Genevieve Nnaji) travels from Nigeria to the United States to aide her sister Anya (Omotola Jalade-Ekeinde) who is being charged with the murder of three men, including her own husband.

== Cast ==
- Omotola Jalade-Ekeinde as Anya Opara Michino
- Genevieve Nnaji as Chioma Opara
- Odalys García as Carolina
- Jeff Swarthout as Don Deccico
- Clem Ohameze as Papa Oparara
- Ulrich Que as Jalen
- Jon Woodward as Michael Michino

== Reception ==
Nollywood Reinvented rated the movie 68% and praised its ability to touch on a diversity of topics.

The Independent wrote: "Ijé is an unsparing, outsider’s portrayal of America’s social prejudices, one that Hollywood films cannot construct themselves. Anyaene nails social comedy too; my favourite exchange involves the protagonist Chioma investigating an affluent white American home. A petite homeowner swings open the door and chirps, “We already give to the Jolie-Pitt fund every year… thank you though!” Film critic Gbenga Awomodu, reviewing for CP Africa, praised the cinematography and acting, remarking that the film "brings to the fore some important themes in today's world, including love, racism, culture, stigma, and life as an immigrant in a foreign country". He further emphasised that the film is illustrative of culture clashes between Nigeria and the US in attitude towards rape, and the culture of shame, silence, and stigma associated with it.

The film garnered the Award of Excellence at the Canada International Film Festival, the Golden Ace Award at the Las Vegas International Film Festival, the Silver Palm Award at the Mexico International Film Festival, the Melvin van Peebles Award at the San Francisco Black Festival, the Festival Prize for Best International Student at Swansea Bay Film Festival.

== Box office ==
Ijé became the highest grossing Nigerian film, until it was overtaken in 2014 by Half of a Yellow Sun (2013).

== See also ==
- List of Nigerian films of 2010
