= Yoruba literature =

Literature in Yoruba Language

Yoruba literature is the spoken and written literature of the Yoruba people, one of the largest ethno-linguistic groups in Nigeria and the rest of Africa. The Yoruba language is spoken in Nigeria, Benin, and Togo, as well as in dispersed Yoruba communities throughout the world.

== Writing ==
Prior to the nineteenth century, local West African languages, including Yoruba, had adopted a modified Arabic script (Anjemi) as the most widespread form of writing. The oldest history of the Yoruba people, written in the 17th century, was in Yoruba but reportedly used Arabic script.

Many contributions to Yoruba writing and formal study from the nineteenth century onwards were made by Anglican priests of Yoruba origin. A formal Yoruba grammar in the Latin-script alphabet was published in 1843 by Bishop Samuel Ajayi Crowther. He was of Yoruba origin himself. Thus, the formation of written Yoruba was facilitated indigenously by the Yoruba people themselves.

== Yoruba religion ==
Yoruba religion is intertwined with history, with the various Yoruba clans claiming to descend from divinities, and some of their kings becoming deified after their deaths. Itan is the word for the sum of Yoruba religion, poetry, song, and history. Yoruba divinities are called Orishas, and make up one of the most complex pantheons in oral history.

Ifá, a complex system of divination, involves recital of Yoruba poetry containing stories and proverbs bearing on the divination. A divination recital can take a whole night. The body of this poetry is vast, and passed on between Ifa oracles.

== Fiction ==
The first novel in the Yorùbá language was Ogboju Ode ninu Igbo Irunmale (translated by Wole Soyinka as The Forest of A Thousand Daemons), although the literal translation is "The bravery of a hunter in the forest of deities", written in 1938 by Chief Daniel O. Fagunwa (1903–1963). It contains the picaresque tales of a Yoruba hunter encountering folklore elements, such as magic, monsters, spirits, and gods. Fagunwa wrote other works based on similar themes, and remains the most widely read Yorùbá-language author.

Amos Tutuola (1920–1997) was greatly inspired by Fagunwa, but wrote in an intentionally rambling, broken English, reflecting the oral tradition of Nigerian Pidgin English. Tutuola gained fame for The Palm-Wine Drinkard (1946, pub 1952), and other works based on Yoruba folklore.

Senator Afolabi Olabimtan (1932–1992) was a writer, university professor, and politician. He wrote Yoruba language novels about modern Nigerian life and love, such as Kekere Ekun (1967; [Lad Nicknamed] Leopard Cub), and Ayanmo (1973; Predestination).

== Theatre ==
In his pioneering study of Yoruba theatre, Joel Adedeji traced its origins to the masquerade of the Egungun (the "cult of the ancestor"). The traditional rite is controlled exclusively by men and culminates in a masquerade in which ancestors return to the world of the living to visit their descendants. In addition to its origin in ritual, Yoruba theatre can be "traced to the 'theatrogenic' nature of a number of the deities in the Yoruba pantheon, such as Obatala the orisha of creation, Ogun the orisha of creativeness and Sango the orisha of lightning", whose worship is imbricated "with drama and theatre and their symbolic and psychological uses."

The Aláàrìnjó theatrical tradition sprang from the Egungun masquerade. The Aláàrìnjó were a troupe of traveling performers who were masked (as were the participants in the Egungun rite). They created short, satirical scenes that drew on a number of established stereotypical characters. Their performances used mime, music and acrobatics. The Aláàrìnjó tradition influenced the Yoruba Travelling Theatre, which was the most prevalent and highly developed form of theatre in Nigeria from the 1950s to the 1980s. In the 1990s, the Yoruba travelling theatre moved into television and film and now gives live performances only rarely.

"Total theatre" also developed in Nigeria in the 1950s. It used non-Naturalistic techniques, surrealistic physical imagery, and exercised a flexibile use of language. Playwrights writing in the mid-1970s made use of some of these techniques, but articulated them with "a radical appreciation of the problems of society."

Traditional performance modes have strongly influenced the major figures in contemporary Nigerian theatre. The work of Chief Hubert Ogunde (sometimes referred to as the "father of contemporary Yoruban theatre") was informed by the Aláàrìnjó tradition and Egungun masquerades. He founded the first professional Nigerian theatre company in 1945 and served in many roles, including playwright, in both English and Yoruba.

Wole Soyinka is "generally recognized as Africa’s greatest living playwright" and was awarded the 1986 Nobel Prize in Literature. He writes in English, sometimes a Nigerian pidgin English, and his subjects (in both plays and novels) include a mixture of Western, traditional, and modern African elements. He gives the god Ogun a complex metaphysical significance in his work. In his essay "The Fourth Stage" (1973), Soyinka argues that "no matter how strongly African authors call for an indigenous tragic art form, they smuggle into their dramas, through the back door of formalistic and ideological predilections, typically conventional Western notions and practices of rendering historical events into tragedy." He contrasts Yoruba drama with classical Athenian drama, relating both to the 19th-century German philosopher Friedrich Nietzsche's analysis of the latter in The Birth of Tragedy (1879). Ogun, he argues, is "a totality of the Dionysian, Apollonian and Promethean virtues." He develops an aesthetic of Yoruba tragedy based, in part, on the Yoruba religious pantheon (including Ogun and Obatala).

Akinwunmi Isola was a popular novelist (beginning with O Le Ku, Heart-Rending Incidents, in 1974), playwright, screenwriter, film producer, and professor of the Yoruba language. His works include historical dramas and analyses of modern Yoruba novels.

== See also ==
- Oríkì and Ìjálá – Specific praise poetry styles
- Hausa literature
- Igbo literature
- Efik literature
- Edo literature
- List of Nigerian writers
- Third Generation of Nigerian writers

== Sources ==
- African literature Encyclopædia Britannica article
- African literature: Yoruba literature Britannica Student Encyclopedia article
- Adedeji, Joel (1969). "Traditional Yoruba Theater". African Arts. 3 (1). UCLA James S. Coleman African Studies Center. JSTOR 3334461.
- Banham, Martin; Hill, Eroll; Woodyard, George (January 2005). The Cambridge Guide to African and Caribbean Theatre. Cambridge University Press. ISBN 9780521612074.
- Barringer, Terry; Wallace, Marion (July 2014). African Studies in the Digital Age: DisConnects?. BRILL. ISBN 9789004279148.
- Noret, Joël. 2008. "Between Authenticity and Nostalgia: The Making of a Yoruba Tradition in Southern Benin." African Arts 41.4 (Winter): 26-31.
- Soyinka, Wole. 1973. "The Fourth Stage: Through the Mysteries of Ogun to the Origin of Yoruba Tragedy." In The Morality of Art: Essays Presented to G. Wilson Knight by his Colleagues and Friends. Ed. Douglas William Jefferson. London: Routledge and Kegan Paul. 119-134. ISBN 978-0-7100-6280-2.
