= Adejumo =

- Language: Yoruba

Origin
- Region of origin: West Africa

Adéjùmọ̀ is a surname of Yoruba origin, meaning "the crown or royalty comes together alike (to collaborate)".

Notable people with the surname include:

- Olusegun Adejumo (born 1965), Nigerian visual artist
- Raheem Adejumo, Nigerian philanthropist, businessman and administrator
- Soji Adejumo, Nigerian Professor of animal physiology and politician
- Arinpe Gbekelolu Adejumo, Nigerian Professor of Yoruba language and literature
