= Igbó Olódùmarè =

1949 novel written by Daniel O. Fagunwa

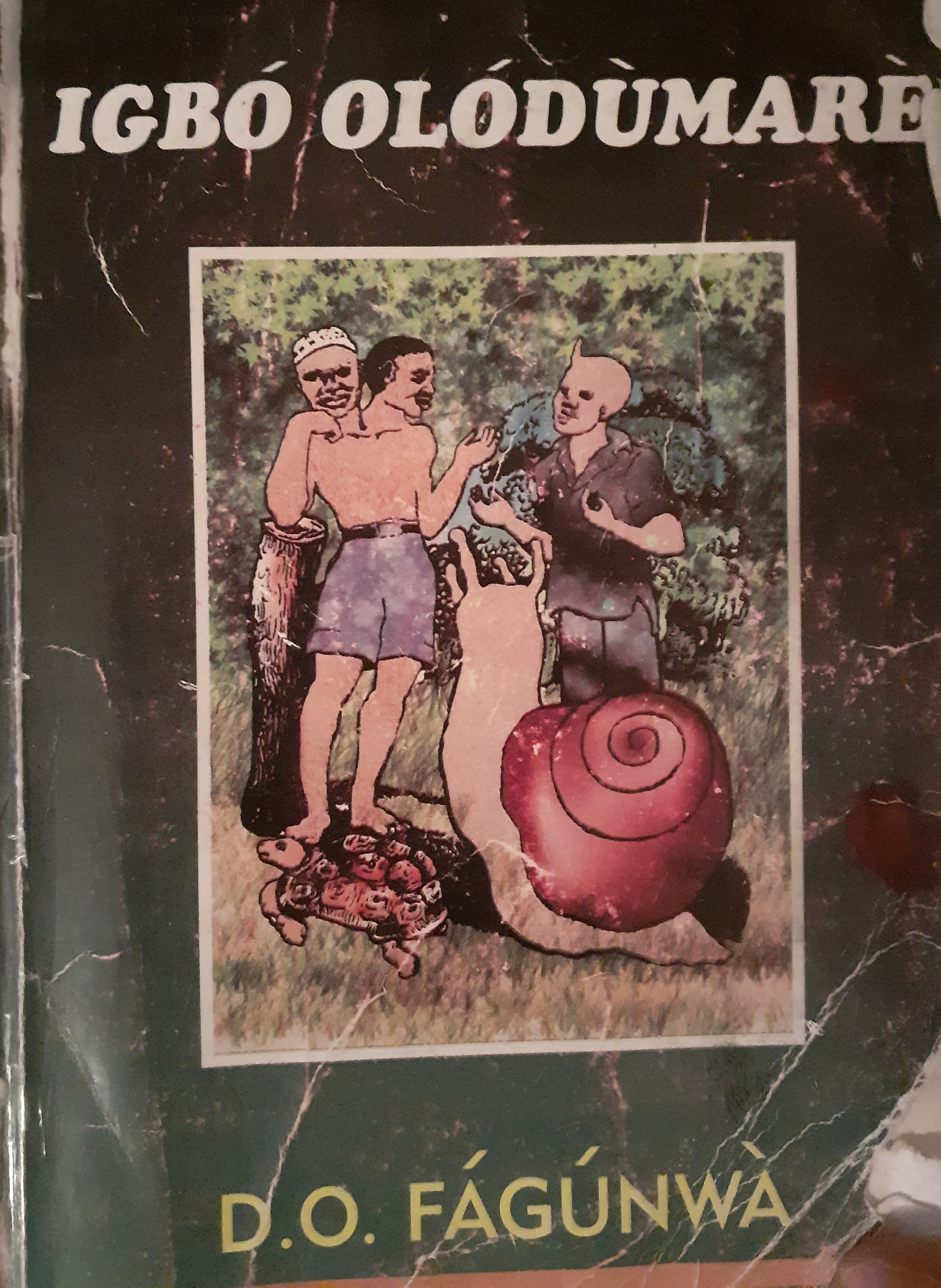
- First edition (UK)
- Author: Daniel O. Fagunwa
- Language: Yorùbá
- Publisher: Nelson Publishers Limited in association with Evans Brothers (Nigeria Publishers) Limited
- Publication date: 1949
- Publication place: Nigeria
- Pages: 165
- ISBN: 978 126 241 9
- Preceded by: Ògbójú Ọdẹ nínú Igbó Irúnmọlẹ̀
- Followed by: Ìrèké Oníbùdó

Igbó Olódùmarè (English translation: The Forest of God) is the second novel by the Yorùbá author D. O. Fágúnwà, published in 1949 by Thomas Nelson. It is a prequel to his first book and details the adventures of Olowo-Aiye, the father of the protagonist in Ògbójú Ọdẹ nínú Igbó Irúnmọlẹ̀.

== Plot ==
The scribe, the same one as in Ògbójú Ọdẹ nínú Igbó Irúnmọlẹ̀, is sitting on a rock when he is approached by Akara-Ogun, the hero of Ògbójú Ọdẹ nínú Igbó Irúnmọlẹ̀. Akara-Ogun joins the scribe at his house to tell the life story of his father, Olowo-Aiye.

At twenty-five years old, Olowo-Aiye decides to venture into the forest known as Igbó Olódùmarè. He first arrives at Igbo Idakeroro, the Forest of Impenetrable Silence where he is confronted by Esu-kekere-ode, Tiny Fiend of the Border, and the two begin to fight. Olowo-Aiye finally plays a tune on his flute which proclaims that since God is the architect of all victories, neither combatant can change the outcome of God's will. With this realisation, the two stop fighting.

Olowo-Aiye then meets two witches who are sisters coming along the road. One of them, Ajediran, asks to marry him and he agrees. Upon entering the forest, Olowo-Aiye meets Anjonnu-iberu, the Ghommid-of-Fear and Guardian of the Gateway to Igbó Olódùmarè. Anjonnu-iberu has a ledger of sins and when Olowo-Aiye will not swear that he has committed none of them, the two begin to fight. Eventually Anjonnu-iberu transforms himself into a boa and Olowo-Aiye, with the help of magic fruit from Ajediran, transforms himself into an elephant and crushes the boa. After his victory, the creatures of the forest lead Olowo-Aiye to the king, where he and Ajediran are married.

Here, Akara-Ogun produces a manuscript written by his father, which he reads to the scribe. It tells of how Olowo-Aiye leaves the palace to go hunting one morning and finds himself lost in Igbó Olódùmarè. For several years he lives in a cave until one day, during a storm, he enters a passageway in a rock and finds himself in a hall filled with birds. Here, his dead mother appears to him. He tries to embrace her but his arms clutch at empty air. A man then appears to Olowo-Aiye and brings him to the home of the Furry-Bearded-One, who resides on the promontory of the rock, Baba Onirugbon-yeuke.

On his second day at the home of the Furry-Bearded-One, they go to visit the home of Death, Iku. On the third day, Furry-Bearded-One tells stories to Olowo-Aiye about the corrupting power of wealth, the importance of marriage and the dangers of envy, unbridled ambition, ungratefulness and wickedness. He also tells a story of two young lovers, which resembles the story of Romeo and Juliet.

At dinner at the Furry-Bearded-One's house, Olowo-Aiye meets several men he knows, including Ijambaforiti and Enia-se-pele. They set out to return home. First they reach the City of Snakes and when two snakes coil around Ijambaforiti, he kills them and guards imprison the group. Enia-se-pele meets an old acquaintance, who retrieves the group's weapons. They kill the king, Boa-of-Fury by hiding machetes with the blades facing up where he bathes. Upon the king's death, a battle breaks out. The snakes are defeated by the group when Enia-se-pele turns grains of sand into red-hot ants.

Next they arrive at a place where seven women run around for eternity because they displeased God. The group had been warned to stuff their ears with cotton in order to avoid being seduced by these women's songs. Eventually, the remaining group arrive back at the residence of the King of Igbó Olódùmarè. After resting, Olowo-Aiye leaves the palace and returns to his town, where his wife and son live.

== Characters ==
- Scribe - the same one as in Ògbójú Ọdẹ nínú Igbó Irúnmọlẹ̀
- Akara-Ogun - the hero of Ògbójú Ọdẹ nínú Igbó Irúnmọlẹ̀ and son of Olowo-Aiye
- Olowo-Aiye - the father of Akara-Ogun and hero of Igbó Olódùmarè
- Akowediran - father of Olowo-Aiye
- Idakeroro-ode - father of Akowediran
- Esu-kekere-ode (Tiny Fiend of the Border) - a two foot tall ghommid or kobold who lives in an anthill in Igbo Idakeroro (the Forest of Impenetrable Silence) and bars travellers from entering Igbó Olódùmarè
- Anjonnu-iberu (Ghommid-of-Fear) - a ghommid who guards the entrance into Igbó Olódùmarè
- Ajediran - a witch and Olowo-Aiye's wife
- King of Igbó Olódùmarè - a friend and supporter of Olowo-Aiye and Ajediran
- Furry-Bearded-One who dwells on the rock promontory (Baba Onirugbon-yeuke) - a part human, part ghommid creature, who gained immortality when his mother fed him the fruits of eternal life and was thus instructed by God to live on the borders of heaven.
- Death (Iku) - a Mighty Spirit and neighbour of Furry-Bearded-One
- Disease - a neighbour of Furry-Bearded-One
- Asoju-Olodumare - the messenger of God
- Ijambaforiti - an acquaintance of Olowo-Aiye, a famous elephant hunter
- Enia-se-pele - an in-law of Olowo-Aiye on his mother's side, a wise man
- Goat-Baboon - an acquaintance of Olowo-Aiye, a stupid man
- Ewedaiyepo - an acquaintance of Olowo-Aiye, a diviner
- Ibanuje-isale - an acquaintance of Olowo-Aiye, a gloomy man
- Olohun-duru - a friend of Olowo-Aiye, a singer
- Ojola-ibinu (Boa-of-Fury) - King of the City of Snakes

== English translations ==
There are two English translations of Igbó Olódùmarè:

- The Forest of God by Gabriel A. Àjàdí (Ibadan: Agbo Areo Publishers, 1994 {1984})
- In the Forest of Olodumare by Wole Soyinka (London: Nelson, Ibadan: Evans Brothers Ltd., 2010)
