= Margaret Wrong =

Margaret Christian Wrong (1887–1948) was a Canadian educator, missionary administrator and Africanist. She encouraged the development of African literature. The Margaret Wrong Prize for African Literature was established in her memory after her death.

== Life ==
Margaret Wrong was the oldest child of historian George MacKinnon Wrong and Sophia Hume Blake, the daughter of Edward Blake, Premier of Ontario. The historians Edward Murray Wrong and Humphrey Hume Wrong were younger brothers.

In 1911 Wrong and her brother Murray travelled to England to attend Oxford University. After three years studying at Somerville College she returned to Toronto, where she was a YWCA secretary and then a MA history studenty and part-time instructor at the University of Toronto. From 1921 to 1925 she was a Geneva-based travelling secretary of the World Student Christian Federation. From 1926 to 1929 she was based in London, setting up home in Golders Green with the anthropologist Margaret Read, and working as a missions secretary for the British Student Christian Movement. A seven-month 1926 tour of sub-Saharan Africa, together with Mabel Carney of Teachers College, Columbia University, led to a longlasting interest in Africa.

In 1929 Wrong became head of the new International Committee on Christian Literature for Africa (ICCLA), encouraging the development of African education and written literature. She travelled extensively in sub-Saharan Africa, and was on her fifth tour when she died suddenly in Gulu, Uganda in 1948.

A year after Wrong's death, the Margaret Wrong Prize for African Literature was established in her memory. Those involved in establishing the prize included Seth Irunsewe Kale, Rita Hinden, Lord Hailey, Ida Ward and Margaret Read.

== Works ==
- (with Jackson Davis and Thomas M. Campbell) Africa Advancing. A Study of Rural Education and Agriculture in West Africa and the Belgian Congo. New York: Friendship Press, 1945.
