= Papalolo =

Stage name of Nigerian comedian Ayo Ogunsina

Papalolo is the stage name for Ayo Ogunsina, a Nigerian comedian.

== Life and Career ==
He is a member of the Awada Group and he performed alongside Tajudeen Gbadamosi (a.k.a. Jacob) and Kayode Olaiya (a.k.a. Aderupoko) on Nigerian Television for most of the 1980s. He got into acting through joining the theatre group of the late theatre icon, Adedeji Hubert Ogunde, with whom he performed across the West African coast (Republic of Benin, Ghana, Ivory Coast and Liberia) in the 1960s.

The trio of Papalolo, Jacob and Aderupoko are credited with leading the advancement of comedy in Nigeria in the 1970s and 80s. They were one of the first Nigerian Comedians to release their material as albums on vinyl. Notable of which is the hilarious comedy sketch 'Pa Jacob Is Ku'.

Plays on Nigerian TV included the very successful comedy Owo Tabua (Plenty Money), which was syndicated on NTA, Ibadan, Lagos Television (LTV 8) and Ogun State Television, OGTV, Abeokuta.

He was born in the early 1940s and attended Wesley College, Ibadan.
