= Esther Olukoya and Emily Ogunde =

Nigerian centenarian identical twins

Esther Olukoya
- Citizenship: Nigerian
- Occupations: Pastor, Author
- Organization(s): Mountain of Fire and Miracles Ministries
- Known for: Co-founder of Mountain of Fire and Miracles Ministries
- Notable work: Christian literature and teachings
- Title: Co-founder, Mountain of Fire and Miracles Ministries
- Spouse: Daniel Olukoya

Esther Taiwo Olukoya and Emily Kehinde Olukoga-Ogunde (both born March 16, 1913, Ijebu-Ode) were centenarian identical twin sisters from Nigeria. They celebrated their 100th birthday in 2013, as Nigeria's oldest twins. At the time, unlike her twin sister, Esther used a wheelchair. They were both traders by profession. Emily was also one of the wives of the veteran actor Hubert Ogunde. They attributed their longevity in part to heredity (their mother died at age 104) and in part to their choice for a healthier lifestyle (they neither smoked nor drank) and their faith in God. Emily died in September 2013. Esther died in 2018.
