= Solomon Babalola =

Nigerian academic, poet, and scholar

Solomon Adeboye Babalola(born Ipetumodu, Osun State, Nigeria, 17 December 1926 – 15 December 2008) was a Nigerian academic, poet and scholar.

== Biography ==
Professor Solomon Adeboye Oladele Babalola was born on December 17, 1926, into the Babalola family of Ile-Ajo. His father, Joseph Olawuni Omowunmi Babalola (Ajala) was a master carpenter, renowned for the charitable re-building of homes in Ipetumodu after severe storm damage very early in the 20th Century; hence the family title "Alatunse of Ipetumodu" – "The Fixer", a family that improves their environment. His father was also a devoted Christian.

Babalola was baptised into Christ Church of the Church Missionary Society (C.M.S.). He had a strong Christian upbringing and attended the C.M.S Christ Primary School, Wasimi, Ipetumodu. He was an active member of the church choir and often sang in the shower throughout his life. Babalola accepted Christ as his Lord and Saviour while at Igbobi College, and was confirmed by the Bishop of Lagos, Rt. Rev. Gordon Vining on November 24, 1943.

== Education ==
In 1936, at the age of 10, Babalola was selected by his teacher, Mr. S.T. Fakoya, to sit for the entrance examination to the Government Colleges of Nigeria. This examination was held in Ibadan, and as a Standard Four boy, he competed with the big boys in Standards Six and Five. It was a good practice run; in 1937 he took the Entrance Examination to Igbobi College, Lagos and was admitted into Form One in January 1938. This was the beginning of his academic prowess.

Adeboye was Senior Prefect and Captain of Oluwole House from January to June 1944, before proceeding to Achimota College in the Gold Coast, now Ghana, to pursue the Intermediate Bachelor of Arts Programme, on scholarship from Igbobi College. It was while at Achimota School, that the detailed results of the School Certificate Examination of Igbobi College was received. He had passed with 9 ‘A’s or "alphas". This made him popular.

Babalola was invited to sit the examinations to the University Section although he was given automatic admission based on his academic antecedents. Thereafter, he received the results of his B.A. Examinations – "A" Very Good in English and Latin; "B" Good in Geography and Economics.

== Career ==
From 1946 – 1948, he was a teacher. On August 8, 1946, he returned to Igbobi College where he was known as "Nine-Alphas Babalola" or "Accurate Man" – this time as a member of the teaching staff. In August 1947, he applied for the Nigerian Government Colonial Welfare and Development Scholarship. He successfully gained a scholarship tenable at Queen’s College in the University of Cambridge, England at the age of 22.

He arrived in Cambridge in October 1948 and joined the Student Christian Movement and also served as the Secretary of The African Student’s Club. It was at Cambridge that he responded to a request by the BBC West Africa Service to submit English verse translations of the oral poetry of their people.

Babalola translated Yoruba texts of Ijala chants, which Yoruba hunters traditionally entertain themselves with. The entries were adjudged the best and were to be broadcast by Babalola on the West Africa Service Programme styled "Calling West Africa." He was paid a fee for studio recordings! Mr. Swanzy of the BBC then forwarded the translations to the Editor of the Royal African Society’s Journal "African Affairs" for consideration for publication. The editor did publish this English blank verse translation in successive issues of the journal, and the praise he received was more valuable than the fees withheld by the editor! Babalola graduated with a B.A. Honours degree from the University of Cambridge in 1951 and was subsequently conferred the M.A. (Cantab) as is the tradition of that great institution.

Solomon Adeboye Babalola attended Achimota College in Ghana. After obtaining his bachelor's degree in 1946, he taught at Igbobi College. In 1948, he received a second scholarship for his bachelor's degree at Queens' College, Cambridge, earning his degree in 1952. He came back to Igbobi College to continue teaching and he rose to become the first African principal of the school, despite being the youngest staff member. He was awarded a doctoral scholarship in Yoruba literature. In 1962, he was appointed as a lecturer at the Institute of African Studies of Obafemi Awolowo University. He also earned a doctoral degree at the University of London. In 1963, he was professor of African Languages at the University of Lagos.

In 1966, he published The Content and Form of Yoruba Ijala (Oxford University Press). The work introduced Yoruba folk tales, poetic forms and an annotated anthology of Ijala (hunter's songs) poems, translated into English. It won the Amaury Talbot Prize for the best contribution to the people of West Africa's literature that year. The work also opened up for international research on African languages, under Babalola's management at the University of Lagos. The university's School of African and Asian Studies was founded in 1967, with Babalola one of three lecturers, and focused on Nigerian languages such as Yoruba, Igbo, Edo and Hausa.

Babalola's scholarly works have been prominent in preserving a great deal of African oral traditions. Adeboye Babalola died on Monday December 15, 2008.
