= Aláàrìnjó =

Aláàrìnjó (otherwise known as Apidàn) is a traditional dance-theatre troupe among the Yoruba. The dance-theatre was developed in the 16th century.

According to music historian Roger Blench, Aláàrìnjó dates back to the sixteenth century and probably developed from the Egúngún masquerade. However, it soon became professional and split into competing groups. Improved roads allowed groups to travel further and outdo other groups with special effects. The heart of these groups are traditional drums, but in modern performances these are being displaced by heavily amplified European instruments, recorded sound tracks and even short film extracts.

The Aláàrìnjó groups were also the inspiration for the ‘African Music Research Party’ founded by Chief Hubert Ogunde in 1945, the ancestor of modern professional theatre troupes in Nigeria.
