= Ìjálá =

Yoruba poetry style

Ìjálá or Ijala is a form of praise poetry practiced primarily by the Yoruba people. It is associated with the worship of Ogun. It is often performed as a hunter's chant.

Ijala is variously described as a particular vocal style for performing oríkì poetry or as distinct from oriki in its performance by and for hunters. Ijala and oriki are both aspects of Yoruba's oral literature.

A major theme of ijala is deities and human interactions with those deities. Ijala chants often chronicle foraging hunts and are sometimes intended to appease Ogun. Ijala is performed before or after hunts, at festivals, and as entertainment at events such as weddings or naming ceremonies.

== Example ==
Solomon Babalola recorded translations for many ijala. Here is an excerpt from a typical example:

Ògún Eníré ní j'ajá | Eníréè ní j'àgbò.
Ògún ùnkọlàà.
Òun ní jẹ̀ 'gbín-ín.
Ògún onígbààjámọ̀ | irun orí ní jẹẹ.

Ogun of Ire eats dog's flesh, that of Ire eats ram's flesh.
There's Ogun of the circumcision.
He eats snails.
Ogun of the barber eats hair from human's heads.

— Ògúnkànmí Jóògùn of Ẹdẹ
