= Stephen Mpashi =

Zambian writer (1920–1998)

Stephen Andrea Mpashi
- Mpashi at his typewriter, 1950
- Born: 1920; Kasama District, Northern Rhodesia
- Died: 1998 (aged 77–78)
- Education: Saint Aloysius Gonzaga Lubushi Minor Seminary; University of Exeter
- Occupations: Writer, editor
- Writing career
- Language: Bemba, English
- Period: 1947–1978
- Notable works: Cekesoni aingila ubusoja (1950); Pano calo (1956)

Stephen Andrea Mpashi (1920–1998), published as Stephen A. Mpashi, was a Zambian writer and editor. He published at least 18 books between 1947 and 1978, all but one in Bemba. His work spanned fiction, conduct and language manuals, poetry and biography. His best-known works are the novels Cekesoni aingila ubusoja (1950) and Pano calo (1956).

Mpashi joined the Northern Rhodesia and Nyasaland Joint Publications Bureau as an editor in 1951, and by 1965, following Zambian independence, had become Chief Editorial Officer of its successor. He was awarded the Margaret Wrong Prize for African Literature in 1961. He declined to translate his own work into English, holding that readers who wanted it should learn Bemba, though his readership reached well beyond first-language speakers through the mixed mining towns of the Copperbelt. His books were reprinted and taught in schools for decades after independence, and he has been called the most prolific and best known of the early Bemba writers, and in one assessment the most influential literary figure in Zambia.

== Life ==
Stephen Andrea Mpashi was born in Kasama District, Northern Rhodesia (now Zambia) in 1920, although the exact date of his birth is uncertain. He was educated by the White Fathers at Lubushi Seminary, but does not appear to have proceeded to ordination.

After completing his education, he worked as a clerk, cook and labourer in Tanganyika, before joining the colonial army in 1941 and serving in Egypt, Somaliland and Palestine.

In 1951, he began work at the Northern Rhodesia and Nyasaland Joint Publications Bureau. The Bureau had been established in the late 1940s by the Colonial Office to encourage African-language authorship, although scholars differ on whether it also served to manage or contain African political expression. During his early years at the Bureau he worked as an editor and also saw many of his own titles published. In 1955 Mpashi was awarded a bursary from the African War Memorial Fund to study English and Literature at the University of Exeter.

By 1961 Mpashi had risen to Senior Bemba Reader/Translator at the Bureau and was awarded the Margaret Wrong Prize for African Literature. By 1965, and following Zambian Independence, he had become Chief Editorial Officer of the renamed Zambia Publications Bureau.

On retirement, Mpashi opened a bar in Chilenje and named it after a location from one of his novels. Stephen Mpashi died in 1998, according to a publisher's biography, although the exact date is not recorded.

== Works ==
Mpashi's publications appeared over three decades beginning with a 1947 conduct manual entitled Umucinshi (Respect) and ending with a Bemba linguistic guide entitled Tusoobolole Icibemba (Let's sort out Bemba). In between he published works of fiction, poetry and biography as well as further conduct and language guides. He has been called the most prolific and best known of the early Bemba writers, and, in one academic assessment, the most influential literary figure in Zambia. His books were reprinted and taught in schools for decades after independence, and his best-known novel, Pano calo, was reprinted numerous times over more than fifty years.

Through his roles at the Northern Rhodesia and Nyasaland Joint Publications Bureau, Mpashi helped lay the foundation of Zambian literature, and it has been suggested that he had some degree of discretion under his colonial supervisors. Nonetheless, this remained a colonial, and later state-sponsored, publishing system, and it has also been suggested that he exercised self-censorship to keep his work acceptable to the authorities. The only suggestion to the contrary comes from Betty Kaunda, his sole English-language book, in which Mpashi records Betty Kaunda's account that he had anonymously written banned Bemba-language books on Mahatma Gandhi and Jawaharlal Nehru, discovered by police searching her house in February 1955. No other account of this incident has been found. Mpashi's standing continued after independence when he published a one-page article, The Beginnings, in a 1964 edition of New Writing from Zambia, a journal produced by a literary collective called the New Writers Group. His piece appeared immediately after an introduction by Kenneth Kaunda and has been interpreted as an effort by the editors to pay their respects to their elder colleague.

With the exceptions of The Beginnings and Betty Kaunda, all of Mpashi's work was in Bemba. He was reluctant to translate his work into English, despite understanding the language, and when interviewed for the Africa Service of the Voice of America in the 1970s, said: "I don't write about Africans for other people ... to get money in the larger market of English literature." Asked whether his Bemba work should be made available to English readers, he replied: "Let them do it. I don't have to write in vernacular, my own language, then put myself to the task of telling others. Not at all. Those who are interested do the effort." But his readership was not confined to Bemba speakers by birth. Bemba served as the lingua franca of the Copperbelt's colonial mining towns, and most of his readers belonged to a growing, ethnically mixed population of newly literate Bemba speakers there. In his 1962 guide Ifyo balemba amabuku (How to Write Books), Mpashi nonetheless advised aspiring writers to render Bemba "as it is spoken, in the village, by a woman or an old man who has never lived in towns where many languages have adulterated the Bemba language". In the same work he linked this to a wider poetics rooted in ubusuma, a traditional Bemba ethical category joining truth and goodness, writing that "it would not be aesthetically pleasing to write a book from which, when one is done with the reading, one does not retain a worthwhile message at all, because then, the writer will have failed."

Published analysis of Mpashi's individual works remains limited, with most scholarship addressing his career and place in Zambian literary culture rather than the novels themselves. Primorac has called Kalunga Lutato's 1980 doctoral thesis "the richest and most thoroughly considered source of information about Mpashi and his work". However, it was never published and, so far as library records show, survives only as a single physical copy in off-site storage at the University of Wisconsin–Madison.

One of his works that has had some attention is his debut novel, Cekesoni aingila ubusoja (Jackson Becomes a Soldier), which was first published in 1950 by the Northern Rhodesia and Nyasaland Joint Publications Bureau. Primorac describes it as "a novel of emergence". Harold Scheub reads it as a rite-of-passage narrative rooted in oral tradition: an initially dissolute "wastrel", Cekesoni leaves home for a series of military postings in Kenya, Somalia, Ethiopia, Madagascar, Egypt and Israel, undergoing what Scheub calls "a kind of puberty ritual" before returning to demobilise and readjust to rural life. The historian Alfred Tembo cites one episode from the novel as evidence of the mixed motives, including a wish to prove one's virility, behind young Bemba men's enlistment. In it, Cekesoni hides from conscription officers, then volunteers after his experience on the Copperbelt leaves him unwilling to seem afraid. Tembo notes that Mpashi himself served in the war the novel depicts.

Pano calo (1956) has drawn more sustained attention than any other individual work. Primorac reads it as "a fantasy narrative that can be read as an allegory of modernization carried out on Bemba cultural terms". Here a mute village boy, killed on a chief's order, is imagined by the novel as "a spiritual incarnation" of the Christian god, and the man present at his killing, Kampinda, is cursed with the ability to understand the speech of animals, on condition that he never reveal what he hears. Nchindila, who calls the novel Mpashi's "psychological masterpiece", reads it alongside Hugh Lofting's The Story of Doctor Dolittle (1920) for its shared premise of a man gifted with the power to understand animals. Primorac notes that the ordeals of Kampinda and his wife Namukonda end in death, framed by the novel as punishment for their disregard for others, and that the novel later shaped Dominic Mulaisho's The Tongue of the Dumb (1971), which borrows its central motif of a mute child and, in Primorac's words, "the narrative figure of protracted suffering as a pathway to superior understanding".

== Published work ==
=== Fiction ===
- Mpashi, Stephen A. (1950). Cekesoni aingila ubusoja [Jackson Becomes a Soldier] (in Bemba). Cape Town: Oxford University Press, in association with the Northern Rhodesia and Nyasaland Joint Publications Bureau. OCLC 562721638. 100 pp., ill.
- ——— (1951). Uwakwensho bushiku (in Bemba). Cape Town: Northern Rhodesia and Nyasaland Publications Bureau; Oxford University Press. OCLC 562721673. 51 pp., ill.
- ——— (1955). Uwauma nafyala [He who beats his mother-in-law] (in Bemba). Lusaka: Publications Bureau. OCLC 562721685. 85 pp.
- ——— (1956). Pano calo [This World] (in Bemba). Cape Town: Oxford University Press. OCLC 12630098. Published in English translation in 2022 as Frown of the Great.
- ——— (1957). Pio akobekela Vera [Pio becomes engaged to Vera] (in Bemba). Cape Town: Oxford University Press, in association with the Northern Rhodesia and Nyasaland Publications Bureau. OCLC 20954047. 54 pp., ill.
- ——— (1960). Akatabo ka baice (in Bemba). Lusaka: Publications Bureau. OCLC 562721629.
- ——— (1968). Pio na Vera [Pio and Vera] (in Bemba). Lusaka: Oxford University Press. OCLC 12630152.

=== Non-fiction ===
- Mpashi, Stephen A. (1947). Umucinshi [Respect] (in Bemba). Ndola: African Literature Committee. 65 pp. Second edition (1952): OCLC 562721667.
- ——— (1951). Ubusuma bubili [Two types of beauty] (in Bemba). Northern Rhodesia and Nyasaland Publications Bureau. Advice to women on appearance and conduct. Second edition (1955): OCLC 416937146.
- ——— (1952). Ukupoke cinsenda ku nkoko [To extract a worm from a chicken] (in Bemba). Cape Town: Oxford University Press, in association with the Northern Rhodesia and Nyasaland Joint Publications Bureau. OCLC 45824766.
- ——— (1955). Icibemba cesu na mano yaciko [Our Bemba language and its wisdom] (in Bemba). Cape Town: Oxford University Press, in association with the Northern Rhodesia and Nyasaland Joint Publications Bureau. OCLC 22601198. A compendium of Bemba proverbs.
- ——— (1956). Abapatili bafika ku baBemba [The Catholic priests arrive among the Bemba]. Mission Histories (in Bemba). Cape Town: Oxford University Press. OCLC 651070825. 29 pp. Later published as Abapatili bafika ku Lubemba.
- ——— (1958). Bakutemwe [Make yourself lovable] (in Bemba). Lusaka: Publications Bureau. OCLC 33315713. On marriage.
- ——— (1962). Ifyo balemba amabuku [How books are written] (in Bemba). Lusaka: Northern Rhodesia and Nyasaland Publications Bureau. OCLC 22601264.
- ——— (1969). Betty Kaunda. Lusaka: Longmans of Zambia. OCLC 1275419. 76 pp. Written in English.
- ——— (1969). Tumone Icibemba [Let's study Bemba] (in Bemba). Lusaka: Longman Zambia. OCLC 61768487.
- ——— (1978). Tusoobolole Icibemba [Let's sort out Bemba] (in Bemba). Lusaka: NECZAM. LCCN 81980791. 48 pp. A Bemba reader.

=== Poetry ===
- Musapu, Joseph; Mpashi, Stephen A. (1962). Amalango [Poems] (in Bemba). Lusaka: Northern Rhodesia and Nyasaland Publications Bureau. OCLC 563130829.

=== Translations ===
- Mpashi, Stephen A. (2022). Mwanaka, Tendai Rinos (ed.). Pano calo/Frown of the Great: A Bemba and English Bilingual Translation Version. Translated by Kaluba, Austin. Chitungwiza: Mwanaka Media and Publishing. ISBN 978-1-77921-335-8.

=== Other writing ===
- Mpashi, Stephen A. (1964). "The Beginnings". New Writing from Zambia. 1 (2). Lusaka: New Writers Group: 4.

== Sources ==
- The Bookseller (1 December 1962). "Multilingual Publishing in N. Rhodesia". The Bookseller. p. 2058.
- The Bookseller (20 March 1965). "Booksellers Association of Zambia". The Bookseller. p. 1521.
- Chilala, Cheela Himutwe K. (2016). "Footprints of Caliban: Appropriation of English in Selected African Fictional Texts". Ufahamu: A Journal of African Studies. 39 (2): 59–72.
- Chilala, Cheela Himutwe K. (2018). "The Invisible Hand: Zambian Literature and (Self)Censorship from the Colonial to the Post-colonial Period". Multidisciplinary Journal of Language and Social Sciences Education. 1 (2): 27–62.
- Davis, Caroline (2015). "Creating a Book Empire: Longmans in Africa". In Davis, Caroline; Johnson, David (eds.). The Book in Africa: Critical Debates. New Directions in Book History. Basingstoke: Palgrave Macmillan. pp. 128–152. ISBN 978-1-137-40161-8.
- Hinfelaar, Marja (2003). "Remembering Bishop Joseph Dupont (1850–1930) in Present-Day Zambia". Journal of Religion in Africa. 33 (4): 365–376. JSTOR 1581748.
- Lutato, Kalunga S. (1980). The influence of oral narrative traditions on the novels of Stephen A. Mpashi (PhD thesis). Madison, Wisconsin: University of Wisconsin–Madison.
- Mason, Jody (2024). "The Margaret Wrong Memorial Fund, Late Colonial Development, and the Prizing of African Literatures, 1950–62". Research in African Literatures. 54 (4): 26–55. doi:10.2979/ral.00025.
- Mwangi, Evan Maina (2017). Translation in African Contexts: Postcolonial Texts, Queer Sexuality, and Cosmopolitan Fluency. Kent, OH: Kent State University Press.
- Mwansa, Joseph M. (2018). "Bemba". In Kamusella, Tomasz; Ndhlovu, Finex (eds.). The Social and Political History of Southern Africa's Languages. London: Palgrave Macmillan. pp. 31–49. doi:10.1057/978-1-137-01593-8_3. ISBN 978-1-137-01592-1.
- Nchindila, Bernard Mwansa (2011). "In Search of Doctor Dolittle in Zambian Bemba Fiction". Journal of Literary Studies. 27 (3): 111–130. doi:10.1080/02564718.2011.614407.
- Notes and News (1962). "Notes and News: Margaret Wrong Memorial Fund: Award for 1961". Africa: Journal of the International African Institute. 32 (4): 395. JSTOR 1157440.
- Primorac, Ranka (2011). "Editorial: Debating Local Cosmopolitanisms". Journal of Commonwealth Literature. 46 (1): 3–7. doi:10.1177/0021989410395427.
- Primorac, Ranka (2012). "Legends of Modern Zambia". Research in African Literatures. 43 (4): 50–70. JSTOR 10.2979/reseafrilite.43.4.50.
- Primorac, Ranka (2013). "Lazymen's Clinic: A Musing on Everyday Life and Research". In Newell, Stephanie; Okome, Onookome (eds.). Popular Culture in Africa: The Episteme of the Everyday. New York: Routledge. pp. 295–309. doi:10.4324/9780203587966-20.
- Primorac, Ranka (2014). "At Home in the World? Re-Framing Zambia's Literature in English". Journal of Southern African Studies. 40 (3): 575–591. doi:10.1080/03057070.2014.909257. JSTOR 24566492.
- Primorac, Ranka (2018). "God's Arrows". Research in African Literatures. 49 (4): 85–106. JSTOR 10.2979/reseafrilite.49.4.07.
- Scheub, Harold (1985). "A Review of African Oral Traditions and Literature". African Studies Review. 28 (2/3): 1–72. JSTOR 524603.
- Tembo, Alfred (2021). War and Society in Colonial Zambia, 1939–1953. War and Militarism in African History. Athens, OH: Ohio University Press. ISBN 9780821424629.
