= Daniel O. Fagunwa =

Nigerian author

Chief Daniel Olorunfẹmi Fágúnwà MBE
- Born: Daniel Oròwọlé Fágúnwà; 1903; Oke-Igbo, Nigeria
- Died: 7 December 1963 (aged 59–60); Bida, Nigeria
- Resting place: Oke-Igbo, Nigeria
- Occupations: teacher, author
- Spouse: Chief Elizabeth Adebanke Fágúnwà (1932–2018)
- Writing career
- Language: Yorùbá
- Period: 1930–1963
- Notable works: Ògbójú Ọdẹ nínú Igbó Irúnmọlẹ̀ (1938); Igbó Olódùmarè (1949); Ìrèké Oníbùdó in 1949; Ìrìnkèrindò Nínú Igbó Elégbèje (1954); Àdììtú Olódùmaré (1961)

Chief Daniel Olorunfẹmi Fágúnwà MBE (1903 – 7 December 1963), popularly known as D. O. Fágúnwà, was a Nigerian author of Yoruba heritage who pioneered the Yoruba language novel.

== Early life ==
Daniel Oròwọlé Fágúnwà was born in Òkè-Igbó, Ondo State in 1903, to Joshua Akíntúndé Fágúnwà and Rachel Òṣunyọmí Fágúnwà. He had three sisters, Mary Adéyẹmí, Ojúọlápé and Ọmọ́túndé. Prior to his family's conversion to Christianity, his name was Oròwọlé Jàáníìni. The name Oròwọlé, refers to the Yorùbá bullroarer deity, Orò.

Fágúnwà's parents were originally adherents of the traditional Yorùbá religion until they converted to Christianity in the late 1910s to early 1920s. Upon conversion, he changed his name to Ọlọ́runfẹ́mi (God loves me).

He attended St. Luke's School, Òkè-Igbó from 1916 to 1924. After completing his primary education there, he taught as a student teacher in the same school in 1925.

From 1926 to 1929, he attended St. Andrew's College, Ọ̀yọ́ in order to train as a teacher. He met his wife in Mọdákẹ́kẹ́ in 1931 while on vacation from St.Andrew's. They courted for six years and married in 1937.

== Family history ==
Fágúnwà's paternal great-grandfather was Faniyi Arojo, a warrior. His son, Fagunwa's paternal grandfather was Egunsola Asungaga Bèyíokú, an Ifa priest from the town of Origbo near Ipetumodu. His paternal grandmother was Sayoade Olowu, an Owu woman who was a daughter of the Olowu of Owu (before they migrated to Abeokuta). Asungaga moved from Origbo to Ile-Ife after his children continued dying (this Yorùbá process is called abiku). Asungaga himself was an abiku child. When he arrived to Ile-Ife, in the 1870s, he became the native herbalist and Ifa priest for the future Ooni of Ife, Ologbenla. After the war between the Ondo and Ife ended, many warriors were allowed to enter a new settlement they called "Oko-Igbo" meaning Farm in the Forest, and later became Òkè-Igbó. Asungaga had four surviving children, Ifatosa, Akintunde Fagunwa (who later took the name Joshua), Ifabunmi (later married and took the last name Ajibise), and Philip Odugbemi.

== Career ==
=== Teaching career ===
From 1930 to 1939 Fágúnwà served as head teacher of the nursery section at St.Andrew's Practicing School, Ọ̀yọ́. In 1940, he was transferred to St.Patrick's School, Ọ̀wọ́, where he taught until 1942. In 1943, he moved to the CMS Grammar School, Lagos and in 1944, moved again to the Girls' School in Benin. Between 1945 and 1946, he taught at Igbobi College, which was temporarily located at Ibadan due to the Second World War, but which relocated back to Lagos in 1946.

Between 1946 and 1948, Fágúnwà was based in Britain on a British Council scholarship. On his return, he taught at the Government Teacher Training Centre in Ibadan for two years. In 1950, Fágúnwà returned to Britain, hoping to pursue a degree, but he returned to Nigeria in 1955 to take up a position of Education Officer with the Publications Branch of the Ministry of Education in Western Nigeria. He held this position until 1959.

=== Literary career ===
In 1938, entering a literary contest of the Nigerian education ministry, Fagunwa wrote his Ògbójú Ọdẹ nínú Igbó Irúnmọlẹ̀, widely considered the first novel written in the Yorùbá language and one of the first to be written in any African language. Wole Soyinka translated the book into English in 1968 as The Forest of A Thousand Demons, first published by Thomas Nelson, then Random House in 1982 and again by City Lights in September 2013 (ISBN 9780872866300). Fagunwa's later works include Igbó Olódùmarè (The Forest of God, 1949), Ìrèké Oníbùdó (1949), Ìrìnkèrindó nínú Igbó Elégbèje (Expedition to the Mount of Thought, 1954), and Àdììtú Olódùmarè (1961).

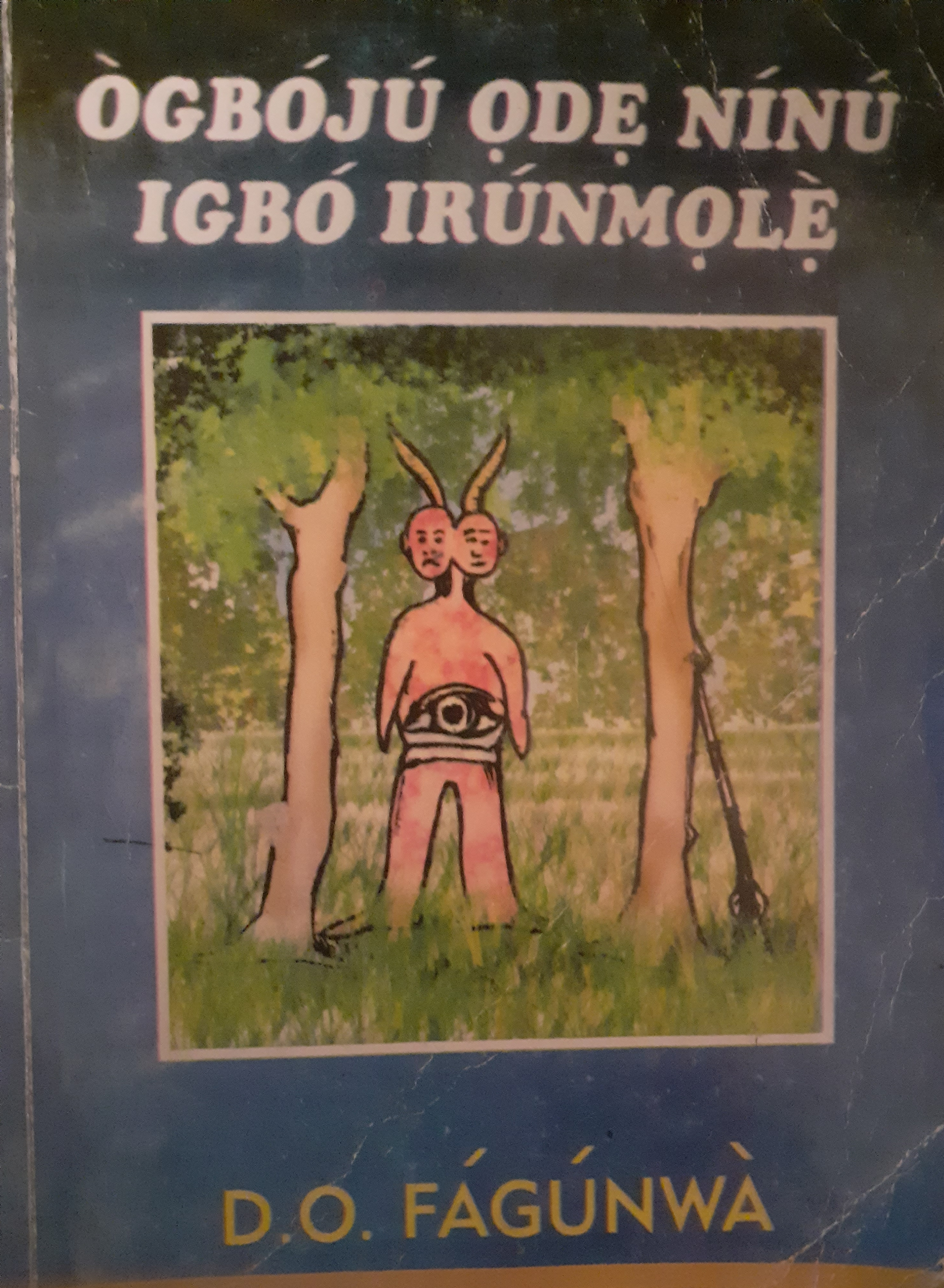
Ògbójú Ọdẹ Nínú Igbó Irúnmọlẹ̀

Fagunwa's novels draw heavily on folktale traditions and idioms, including many supernatural elements. His heroes are usually Yorùbá hunters, who interact with kings, sages, and even gods in their quests. Thematically, his novels also explore the divide between the Christian beliefs of Africa's colonizers and the continent's traditional religions. Fagunwa remains the most widely read Yorùbá-language author, and a major influence on such contemporary writers as Amos Tutuola. He also used Greek myths and Shakespearean stories as themes in his books, such as in his book Igbo Olodumare, where the character Baba-onirugbon-yeuke tells a story similar to Romeo and Juliet.

D. O. Fagunwa was the first Nigerian writer to employ folk philosophy in telling his stories.

Fagunwa was awarded the Margaret Wrong Prize in 1955 and was made a Member of the Order of the British Empire in 1959.

== Death ==
On 7 December 1963, Fágúnwà was in Bida on his way home to Ibadan after a business trip to Northern Nigeria on behalf of Heinemann Books, where he was employed at the time. He arrived early at the River Wuya with his driver and they entered the queue for the pontoon, which would ferry people and cars across the river. While he was waiting for the pontoon service to open, he went for a walk along the riverside and slipped when a bit of earth broke under his foot. When he fell, a nearby canoe turned over onto him and pinned him under the water, drowning him.

His body was recovered two days after the accident and was brought to Ibadan, and then onward to his hometown, Òkè-Igbó. Burial services were held for him in St.Luke's Anglican Church and he is buried in the cemetery there.

== Legacy ==
Chief Fagunwa was created an Oloye of the Yorùbá people prior to his demise in 1963.

Fagunwa Memorial High School and Fagunwa Grammar School in Oke-Igbo, Nigeria, are named for Fagunwa. His daughter, Yejide Ogundipe, serves as a council chairperson for Ile Oluji/Okeigbo. Fagunwa day (formerly known as Fagunwa night) is an annual event aimed at reading and promoting his five books. Fagunwa day was initiated in his honour by the Society of Young Nigerian Writers in conjunction with Fagunwa Literary Society and Egbe Odo Onkowe Ede Yorùbá.

== Works ==
=== Novels ===
- Ògbójú Ọdẹ nínú Igbó Irúnmọlẹ̀ (CMS Bookshop Lagos, 1938)
- Igbó Olódùmarè (Edinburgh: Nelson, 1949)
- Ìrèké Oníbùdó (Edinburgh: Nelson, 1949)
- Ìrìnkèrindó nínú Igbó Elégbèje (Edinburgh:Nelson, 1954)
- Àdììtú Olódùmarè (Edinburgh: Nelson, 1961)

=== Other publications ===
- Ìrìnàjò, Apa Kiní & Apa Kejí (London: Oxford University Press, 1949) | Fágúnwà's account of his travels in Britain
- Táiwò ati Kẹ́hìndé, co-authored with L.J Lewis (London: Oxford University Press, 1949) | Primary School Readers
- Àlàyé fún olùkọ́ nípa lílò Ìwé "Táiwò ati Kẹ́hìndé", co-authored with L.J Lewis (London: Oxford University Press, 1949) | Teachers' Manual
- Ìtàn Olóyin (London: Oxford University Press, 1954) | An edited collection of folktales.
- Òjó Aṣọ̀tán, co-authored with G.L. Lasebikan, published posthumously (London: Heinemann Educational Books Ltd., 1964) | Short story

=== Articles ===
- "Writing a Novel", Teachers' Monthly, vol.6, no.9, October 1960, p. 12
- "Going Overseas", Teachers' Monthly, vol.7, no.4, April 1961, p. 14

=== Translations of Fágúnwà's Work ===
Ògbójú Ọdẹ nínú Igbó Irúnmọlẹ̀

- The Forest of a Thousand Daemons by Wole Soyinka (London: Nelson, 1968) | English
- Akara Ogun, The Brave Hunter In The Forest of Daemons by Edmund Olu Mabo (Self-Published, 2024) | English
- La Foresta Dei Mille Demoni by Mario Biondi (Arnoldo Mondadori Editore, 1985) | Italian
- La Forêt aux Mille Démons by Louis Camara (NENA, 2015) | French
- 400 İlah Ormanı by Bir Avcının Öyküsü (Altıkırkbeş Yayınları, 2016) | Turkish

Igbó Olódùmarè

- The Forest of God by Gabriel A. Àjàdí (Ibadan: Agbo Areo Publishers, 1994 {1984}) | English
- In the Forest of Olodumare by Wole Soyinka (London: Nelson, Ibadan: Evans Brothers Ltd., 2010) | English

Ìrèké Oníbùdó

- Ìrèké Oníbùdó by Alóńgẹ̀ Isaac Olúṣọlá (Ibadan, Nelson Publishers Ltd., 2019) | English

Ìrìnkèrindó nínú Igbó Elégbèje

- Expedition to the Mountain of Thought: The Third Saga by Dapo Adeniyi (Ile-Ife, Nigeria: Obafemi Awolowo University Press Ltd., 1994), OCLC 32257961, LCCN 94-225991 | English

Àdììtú Olódùmarè

- The Mysteries of God by Olu Obafemi (Ibadan: Nelson Publishers Ltd., 2012) | English

== Selected academic works on Fágúnwà ==
- Adéẹ̀kọ́, Adélékè and Adéṣọ̀kàn, Akin (eds.), Celebrating D.O. Fágúnwà: Aspects of African & World Literary History, Bookcraft Africa, 2017, ISBN 978-978-8457-39-8
- Adébọ̀wálé, O., Adélékè, D. and Adéjùmọ̀, A. (eds.), Ọ̀tun Ìmò Nínú Ìtàn-Àròsọ D.O. Fágúnwà. (English translation: New Findings in the Novels of D.O. Fagunwa). Lagos: Capstones Publishers, 2016.
- Adéjùmọ̀, Àrìnpé. "Conceptualizing the Reality of the Millennium Development Goals in Fagunwa's Tradition Novels", Ihafa: A Journal of African Studies 5, 3 (2008): 76–95.
- Olaleru, Olanike. "Oral Performance Techniques in the Works of D. O. Fágúnwà." Ibadan Journal of English Studies 7 (2018): 361–374.

== Additional sources ==
- George, Olakunle. "Compound of spells: the predicament of DO Fagunwa (1903-63)." Research in African literatures 28, no. 1 (1997): 78-97.
