= Glover Memorial Hall =

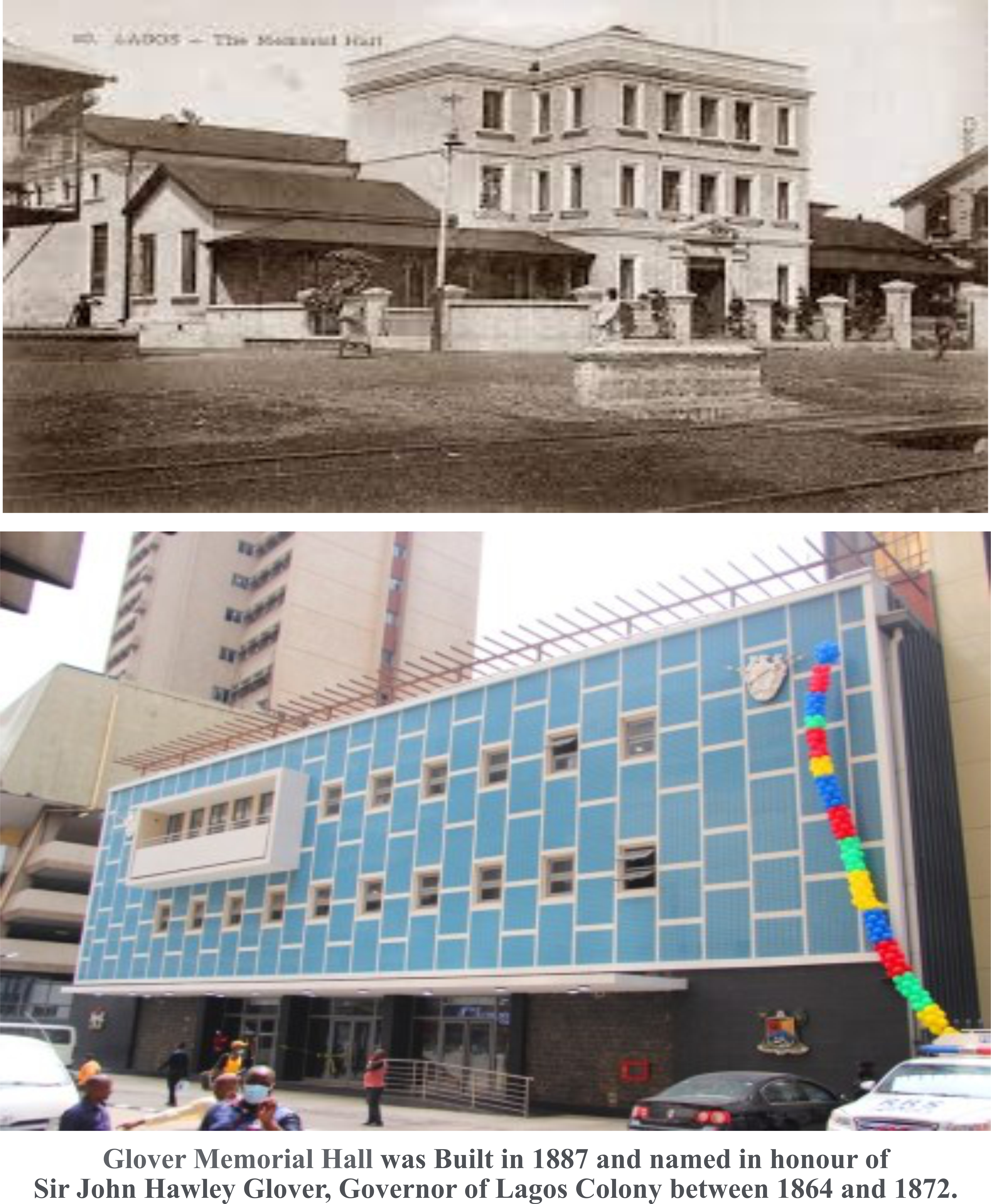
- Glover Memorial Hall in Lagos, Nigeria

General information
- Architectural style: Colonial-era architecture
- Location: Custom Street, Lagos Island, Lagos State, Nigeria
- Named for: Sir John Hawley Glover
- Completed: 1887
- Owner: Lagos State Government

Design and construction
- Known for: Cultural and historical events, theater performances, political gatherings

Glover Memorial Hall is a historic building on Custom Street, Lagos Island, Nigeria. Built in 1887, it was named after Sir John Hawley Glover, a British colonial administrator and former governor of Lagos. The hall was established as a public venue for social gatherings, theatrical performances, and political meetings.

Over the years, it became a key center for Nigerian theater, hosting notable playwrights like Hubert Ogunde. It also played a role in nationalist movements before Nigeria's independence. The building reflects colonial-era architecture and has undergone renovations to preserve its significance.

Despite periods of neglect, Glover Memorial Hall remains a cultural landmark in Lagos, representing the city's artistic and historical heritage. Recent restoration efforts aim to maintain its role as a hub for creative and social activities.
