= Margaret Wrong Prize for African Literature =

The Margaret Wrong Prize for African Literature was an annual prize for African literature which existed from 1950 until the early 1960s. Established in memory of the missionary and educational administrator Margaret Wrong, the prize was administered by the International Committee on Christian Literature for Africa. It was awarded for "original literary work by writers of African race resident in a part of Africa to be determined each year by the Trustees".

== History ==
Margaret Wrong died in 1948. A year after Wrong's death, fourteen individuals - including Seth Irunsewe Kale, Rita Hinden, Lord Hailey, Ida Ward and Wrong's partner Margaret Read – wrote to The Times announcing the intention to establish a trust for a literary prize in Wrong's memory. A committee was formed, initially chaired by Gerald Hawkesworth and then by Christopher Cox, Educational Adviser to the Secretary of State for the Colonies.

The award was originally given to African writers in European languages and Afrikaans, with the recipient receiving both a silver medal and a money prize. In 1954, in reaction to "steady demand for the inclusion of African languages", the award of the silver medal (for writing in an African language) was separated from the money prize (for writing in a European language).

== Winners ==
| Year | Award | Author | Notes |
|---|---|---|---|
| 1950 | £5 Prize & Silver Medal | Gabriel-Adrien Ngbongbo, for Abunawazi le méchant. | Entries in "either English or French" from "Southern Sudan, Somaliland, Uganda, Tanganyika, Zanzibar, and the Belgian Congo." |
| 1951 | £5 Prize & Silver Medal | Abioseh Nicol, for 'The Devil of Yelahun Bridge'. | Entries in "English or French" from Gambia, Sierra Leone, Nigeria, Gold Coast, Liberia, French West Africa, French Equatorial Africa, and French Cameroons." |
| 1952 | £5 Prize & Silver Medal | Óscar Ribas, for 'A Praga'. | Entries "in English or Portuguese" from "Northern and Southern Rhodesia, Nyasaland, Portuguese East Africa and Angola". |
| 1953 | Prize & Medal | | Entries "in English, Afrikaans or French" from "the Union of South Africa, the High Commissions Territories and Madagasgar". |
| 1954 | £20 Prize | Issa Keita, for the essay 'L'Esprit de Conteur noir'. Also commended: F. James Oto and Bernard M. Onyango. | Entries in "English, French, Portuguese or Afrikaans" from "any part of Africa south of the Sahara". |
| 1954 | Silver Medal | Michael B. Nsimbi, for Waggumbulizi. | Entries in "an African language or Arabic", from "Belgian Congo (including Ruanda-Urundi), Southern Sudan, Uganda, Kenya, Tanganyika or Zanzibar". |
| 1955 | £20 Prize | Sannuo Lazare for 'Mon pays d'Hier'. | Entries in "English, French, Portuguese or Afrikaans" from "any part of Africa south of the Sahara". |
| 1955 | Silver Medal | D. O. Fagunwa for Irinkerindo Ninu Igbo Elegbeje. | Entries in "an African language" from "West Africa, including French West and French Equatorial Africa, Liberia, Gambia, Sierra Leone, Gold Coast, and Nigeria". |
| 1956 | £25 Prize | A. W. Kayper-Mensah for Light in Jungle Africa. Second prize (£10) to Wole Soyinka for Oji River, third prize (£5) to Asavia Wandira for The Church Missionary Society in Bugosa District, Uganda. | Entries in "English, French, Portuguese or Afrikaans" from "any part of Africa south of the Sahara". |
| 1956 | Silver Medal | M. C. Mainza, for Kabuka Uleta Tunji. | |
| 1957 | Prize and Medal | James Ranisi Jolobe | |
| 1958 | Prize and Medal | Alexis Kagame | |
| 1959 | | Chinua Achebe | |
| 1960 | Prize and Medal | Shaaban Robert | |
| 1961 | Prize & Medal | S. A. Mpashi | |
| 1962 | Award | Mallam Abukbakar Imam for services as Hausa editor of Gaskiye Ta Fi Kwabo. Wole Soyinka for originality as a playwright. | |
