= Shaaban bin Robert =

Tanzanian poet, author, and essayist

Shaaban Robert MBE
- Born: Shaaban bin Selemani; 1 January 1909; Vibamba village, Tangasisi, Tanga
- Died: 20 June 1962 (aged 53); Dar es Salaam, Tanzania
- Resting place: Machui, Tangasisi, Tanga Region
- Occupations: Civil servant, writer, poet
- Years active: 1932–62
- Known for: kiswahili literature
- Notable work: Kusadikika
- Spouse: Amina
- Children: 10
- Awards: Margaret Wrong Prize and Medal for African Literature

Shaaban bin Robert, also known as Shaaban Robert (1 January 1909 – 20 June 1962), was a Tanzanian poet, author, and essayist who supported the preservation of Tanzanian verse traditions. Robert is celebrated as one of the greatest Tanzanian Swahili thinkers, intellectuals and writers in East Africa and has been called "poet laureate of Swahili" and is also known as the "Father of Swahili." He is also honoured as the national poet.

== Biography ==
Shaaban was born to a father of Yao decent and mother of Digo heritage in the village of Vibamba, Tangasisi ward of Tanga District, located south of Tanga City in Tanga Region, Tanzania (then German East Africa). The surname Robert is a name of a British colonial officer who requested his parent to name him after him. Thus in real sense, Robert was his second name (not his surname or last name), his first name being Shaaban. Shaaban himself for a time wrote it 'Roberts' rather than 'Robert'. From 1922 to 1926 he was educated in Dar es Salaam, coming in second in a class of 11 to receive the School Leaving Certificate under the then British colonial educational system in Tanganyika.

=== Career ===
After receiving the school certificate, Shaaban worked at various posts as a colonial government civil servant. From 1926 to 1944 he was a customs official at different locations throughout the territory including one post at Kwale Island in current day Mkuranga District of Pwani Region. From 1944 to 1946 he worked for the Game Department. From 1946 to 1952 he worked in the Tanga District Office, and from 1952 to 1960 he was in the Survey Office there. He worked very closely with the Tanganyika African National Union (TANU) and Julius Nyerere. Many of his civil service experiences are woven into his writings. During his lifetime he received the Margaret Wrong Prize and Medal for African Literature and was honored by the British government as a Member of the Order of the British Empire (M.B.E.).

== Intellectual work ==
Robert contributed to the promotion of the Swahili language and the struggle for the dignity of mankind. He was a celebrated humanist. He worked for freedom and gender equality, and was against racial and religious discrimination in Tanzania. Tanzania's first president, Julius Nyerere, had complete admiration for the late Shaaban Robert, and greatly valued and promoted his intellectual work. His was also equally respectful of both Muslims and Christians. That is reflected in his two unusual names (Shaaban—Muslim name and Robert, a Christian name).[The name Robert was in fact one of his father's several names, the others being Selemani and Ufukwe]

Sheikh Shaaban Robert succeeded in writing essays, books, prose and poems and some of his literature is part of school curricula and higher education reading. Some of his books included Maisha Yangu na Baada ya Miaka Hamsini, Kusadikika, and Wasifu wa Siti binti Saad. His works are still being discovered and published. To date he has 24 known works.

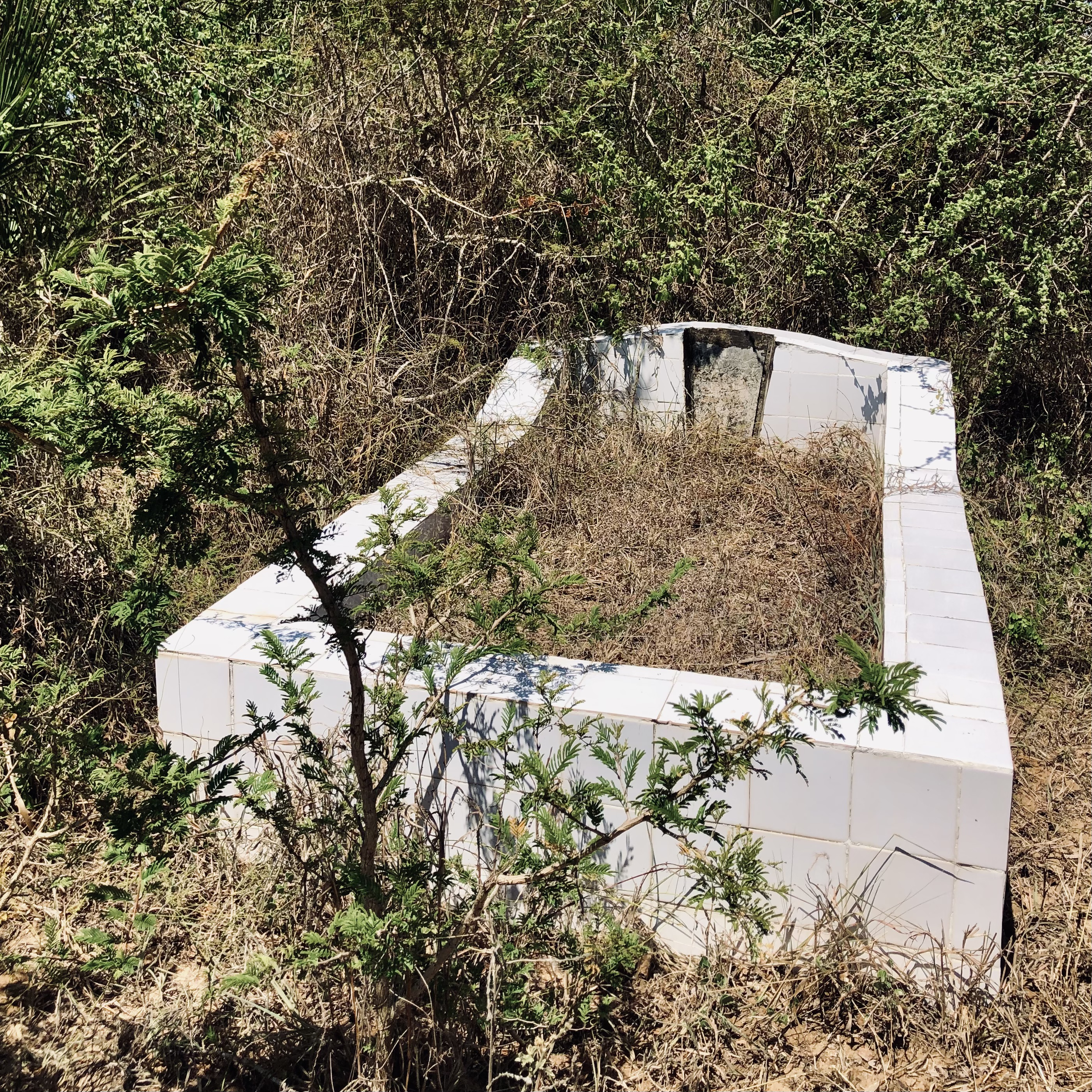
Shabaan Roberts Grave in Tangasisi Ward, Tanga

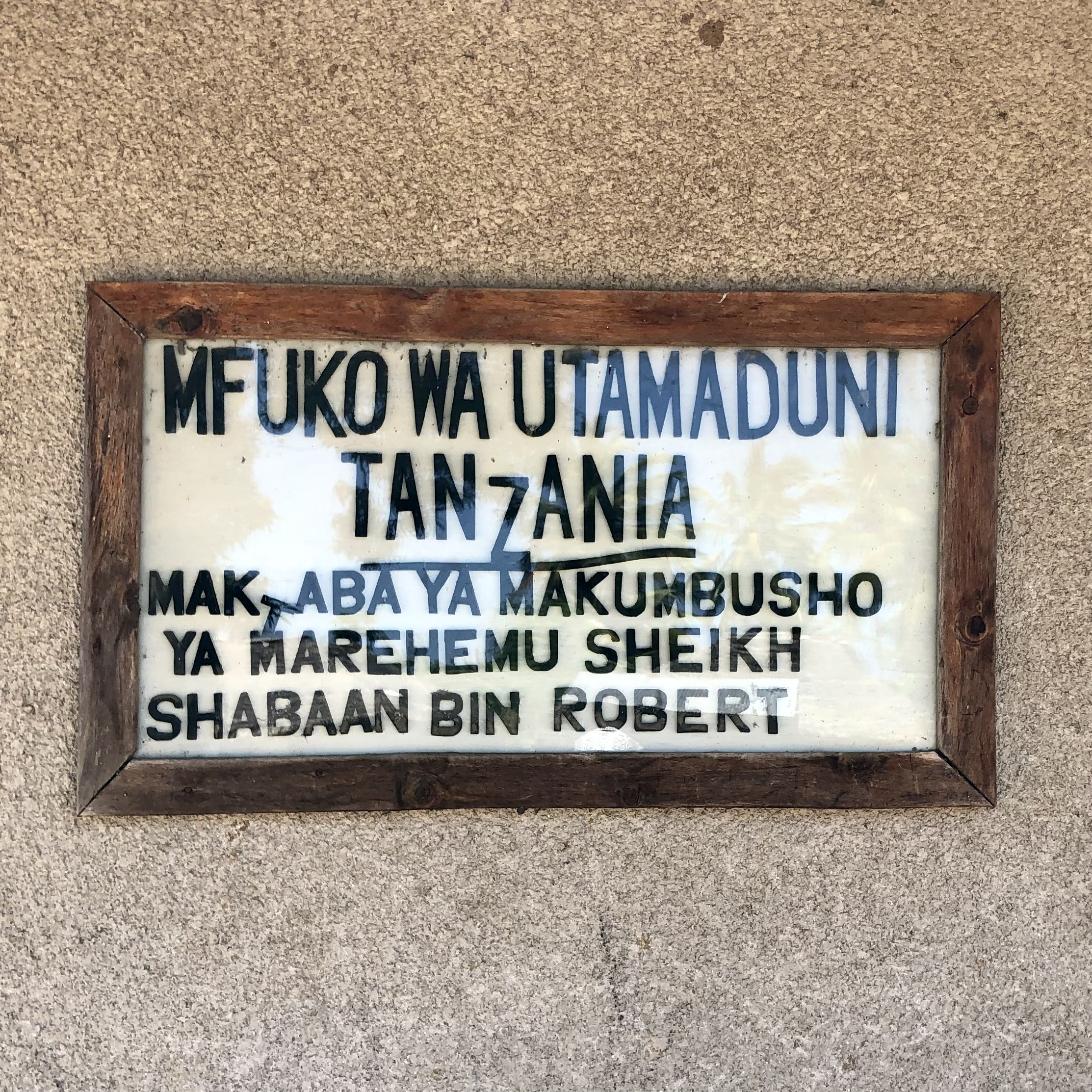
Museum Plate, Tangasisi Ward, Tanga

== Legacy ==
=== Eponyms ===
- Shaaban Robert Secondary School, Dar es Salaam
- Shaaban Robert Street, a street in the Dar es Salaam CBD

== Bibliography ==
- Robert, Shaaban (trans.): Omar Khayyam Kwa Kiswahili London: Macmillan, 1952, (Swahili translation of the Rubaiyat of Omar Khayyam, translator's pref. (in Swahili) dated Tanga, 1948.)
- Bin Robert, Shaaban: Utubora Mkulima (Diwani Ya Shaaban 8) Nelson, London, 1968
- Robert, Shaaban: Koja La Lugha Oxford Univ, Nairobi, 1969

== Relevant literature ==
- Abdalla, Abdilatif. "Utangulizi". Shaaban Robert: Ukakiki wa Maandishi Yake. Dar es Salaam: Longman Tanzania, 1975
- Kezilahabi, Euphrase. Ushairi wa Shaaban Robert. 1976. Nairobi: Kenya Literature Bureau, 1982.
- Ndulute, Clement L. The Poetry of Shaaban Robert. Dar es Salaam: Dar es Salaam UP, 1994.
- Rosenberg, Aaron L. "Making the case for popular songs in East Africa: Samba Mapangala and Shaaban Robert." Research in African Literatures (2008): 99–120.
