= William A. Campbell (Tuskegee Airman) =

USAAF & USAF officer and college-level instructor(1917–2012)

- Born: April 12, 1917; Tuskegee, Alabama
- Died: April 24, 2012 (aged 95); Phoenix, Arizona
- Burial place: Arlington National Cemetery
- Spouse: Wilma Jean Burton
- Military career
- Allegiance: United States
- Branch: United States Army Air Force; United States Air Force
- Service years: 1942–1970
- Rank: Colonel
- Nickname: Wild Bill Campbell
- Units: 332nd Fighter Group; 99th Fighter Group
- Conflicts: World War II; Korean War; Vietnam War
- Awards: Distinguished Flying Cross (2); Legion of Merit; Bronze Star Medal; Air Medal (13)

William A. Campbell (April 12, 1917 – April 24, 2012) was an American pilot and military officer who served with the Tuskegee Airmen during World War II. He served as a wingman in the first combat mission of the Tuskegee Airmen, and rose to the rank of Group Commander of the 332nd Fighter Group shortly after World War II. He subsequently served in both the Korean War and Vietnam War.

== Early life and education ==
Campbell was born in Tuskegee, Alabama, on April 12, 1917, the fourth child of Thomas Monroe Campbell, the first Cooperative Extension Agent in the United States, and Anna Campbell. He had five siblings, including three younger than himself. Campbell attended elementary and high school in Tuskegee, Alabama. He then matriculated at the Tuskegee Normal and Industrial Institute from which he graduated with his Bachelor of Science degree in Business in 1937.

== Military career ==
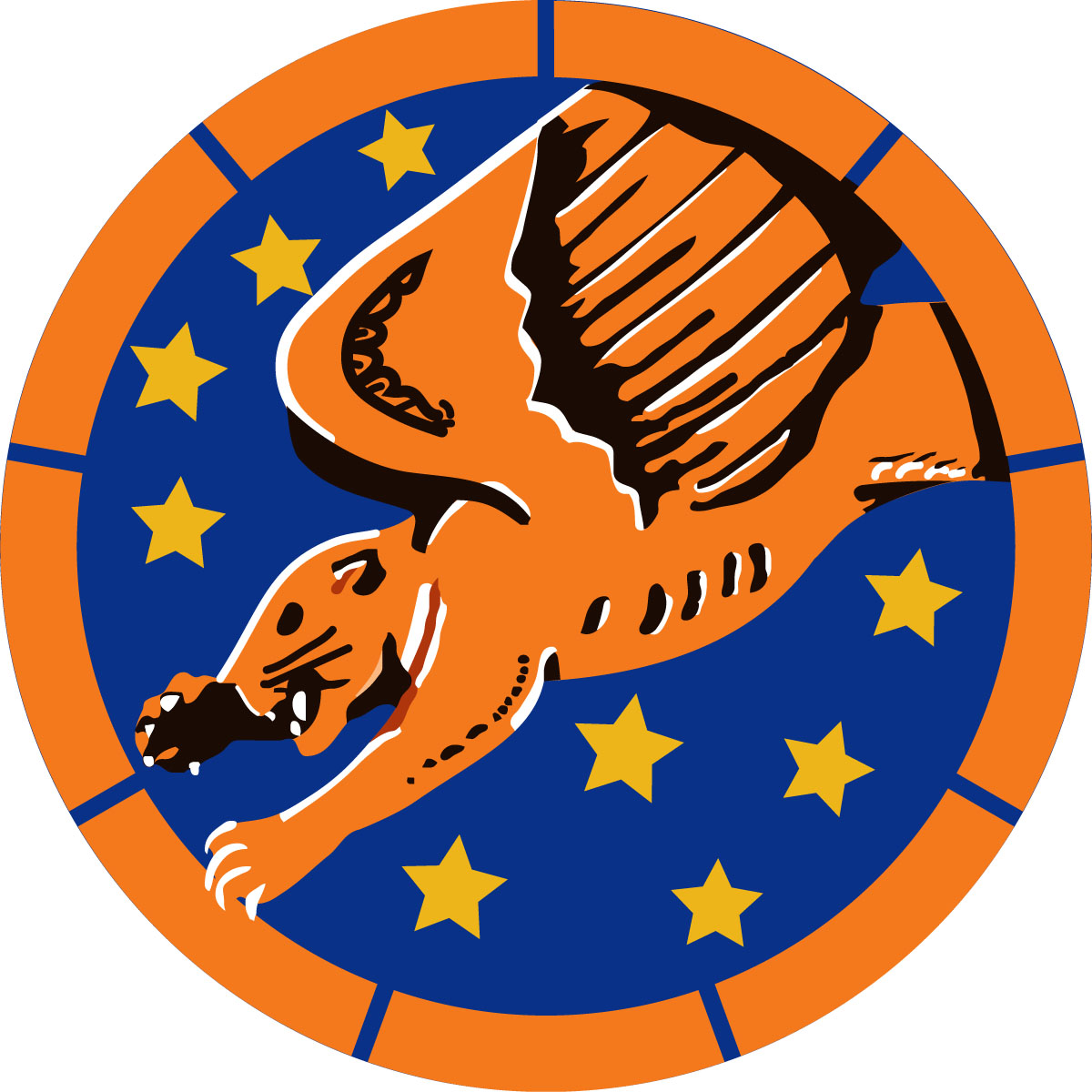
99th Fighter Squadron patch

Following his graduation from the Tuskegee Normal and Industrial Institute, Campbell went to work as a clerk for the United States Department of Agricultural Extension. During his time working for Agricultural Extension, he encountered an opportunity to enroll in the Tuskegee Army Air Field class SE-42-F. He graduated from the program on July 3, 1942, as a second lieutenant. Campbell was then assigned to the 99th Fighter Squadron, commanded by then-Colonel Benjamin O. Davis, Jr., of the 33d Fighter Group commanded by then-Colonel William W. Momyer, which was stationed in Farjouna, Tunisia, in 1943.

Campbell flew in the first combat mission of the 99th Pursuit Squadron on June 2, 1943, as they served as wingmen to pilots of the during World War II. Campbell, Spann Watson, and Herbert V. Clark were given orders to return to the United States to train replacement pilots. They left the European theater on November 5, 1943 and reported for duty to the 553d Fighter-Bomber Squadron in Michigan in December.

Campbell returned to the Europe in 1944 as a captain and, on October 11, he rejoined the 99th Fighter Squadron which was, since July 1944, reassigned from attachment with the 324th Fighter Group of the Twelfth Air Force to the 332d Fighter Group, already consisting of the all black 10th, 301st, and 302nd fighter squadrons which had also come from the Twelfth Air Force, but joined the Fifteenth Air Force in April 1944, which by order of the Fifteenth Air Force, was given the tail identification color of red for their P-47Ds and later P-51s that gave them the name "Red Tails". The mission successfully destroyed 17 enemy airplanes on the ground. Eighteen days later, he assumed command of the 99th Fighter Group as a major, replacing Captain Alfonza W. Davis, on October 29, 1944.

Campbell received the Distinguished Flying Cross on New Year's Day 1945; the medal was presented to him by Brigadier General Dean C. Strother. Three months later, on March 31, 1945, Campbell participated in a mission of the 332d Fighter Group to destroy railroad and other targets in the area surrounding Munich, Germany. The mission successfully shot down 13 enemy fighters; Campbell was credited for one of the 13 kills.

On April 15, 1945, Campbell participated in another strafing mission of railroad targets in the areas around Munich, Salzburg, Linz, Plzeň, and Regensburg. For his actions, Campbell earned an oak leaf cluster in lieu of a second Distinguished Flying Cross. He became the first African American pilot to receive the Distinguished Flying Cross when he was officially awarded the oak leaf cluster on May 29, 1945.

Over the course of World War II, Campbell actively served in the Sicilian and Italian campaigns and flew 106 missions, becoming the first African American pilot to drop a bomb on enemy targets in United States history.

Following World War II, Major Campbell assumed the position of Group Commander of the 332nd Fighter Group on August 28, 1947. Campbell went on to fight in two more wars during his military career, as he served in both Korea and Vietnam. He remained in the service until 1970, reaching the rank of full colonel.

After his retirement from active duty in 1970, Campbell taught Defense Resource Management at the Naval Postgraduate School in Monterey, California, for 13 years and was a member of the Tuskegee Airmen Commission established by the State of Alabama.

== Marriage and children ==
Campbell married Wilma Jean Burton from Chicago in September 1946. He and his wife had three sons: William A. Campbell, Jr., Stephen Campbell, and David Campbell.

== Death and legacy ==
Campbell died at the age of 95 on April 24, 2012, in Phoenix, Arizona. He was buried with full military honors at Arlington National Cemetery. The San Francisco Bay Area Chapter of the Tuskegee Airmen, Inc. was renamed in his honor. Colonel Campbell's personal papers documenting his military career, the Tuskegee Airmen and their service, as well as his personal life were donated to the University of California, Riverside.

== Awards ==
Campbell received numerous medals and awards during his military career, including two Distinguished Flying Crosses, the Legion of Merit, the Bronze Star Medal and 13 Air Medals.
