= Ògbójú Ọdẹ nínú Igbó Irúnmọlẹ̀ =

1938 novel by D.O. Fagunwa

Ògbójú Ọdẹ Nínú Igbó Irúnmọlẹ̀
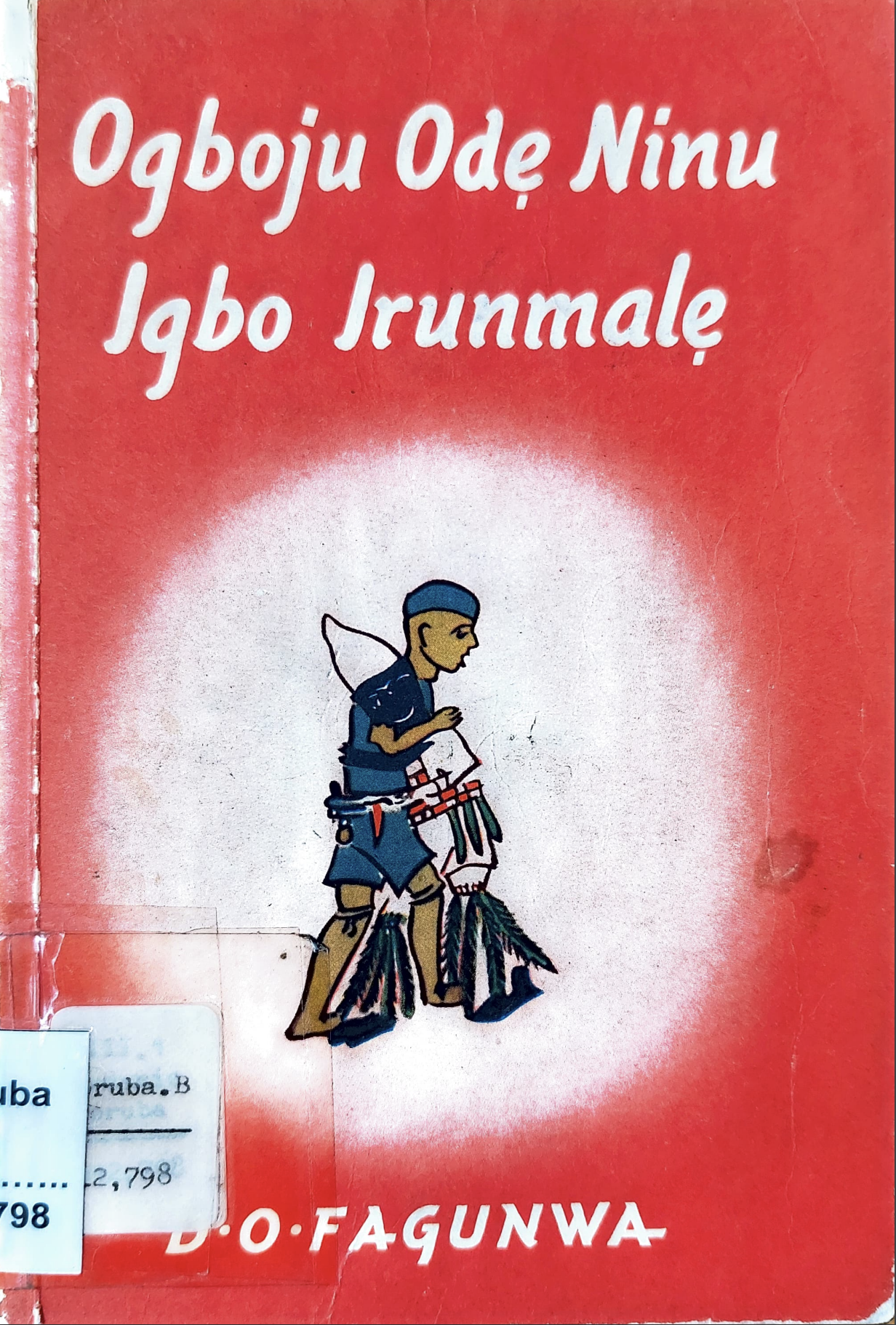
- Nelson edition of Ògbójú Ọdẹ Nínú Igbó Irúnmọlẹ̀. This edition was first published in 1950.
- Author: D.O. Fágúnwà
- Illustrator: Mr. Ọnasanya
- Language: Yorùbá
- Publisher: Church Missionary Society Bookshop, Lagos
- Publication date: 1938
- Publication place: Nigeria
- Pages: 102
- ISBN: 978 126 237 0
- Followed by: Igbó Olódùmarè

Ògbójú Ọdẹ nínú Igbó Irúnmọlẹ̀ (lit. 'The Brave Hunter in the Forest of 400 Deities') is the first novel written by the Yorùbá author D. O. Fágúnwà. It was published by the Church Missionary Society Bookshop, Lagos in 1938 and is one of the first novels written in Yorùbá. It tells the story of the adventures of the hunter Akara-Ogun.

Ògbójú Ọdẹ nínú Igbó Irúnmọlẹ̀ was translated into English by Wole Soyinka in 1968 under the title Forest of a Thousand Daemons: A Hunter's Saga. In his translator's note for the text, Soyinka writes that 'a thousand' in English has "the sound and sense" of the number four hundred in Yoruba.

== Plot ==
The novel opens with the arrival of a stranger to the author's house. The old man introduces himself as the hunter Akara-ogun and asks the author to record the story of his life. He begins by telling of how his father married a woman who was a witch and could transform into an antelope. On the urging of a spirit, Akara-Ogun's father kills his mother and soon dies himself, leaving the hero without parents at the age of twenty-five.

A year later, Akara-Ogun decides to go hunting in Irunmale (Forest of 400 Deities) and is almost captured by Olori-igbo, the king of the ghommids (the strange creatures that live in the forest) until he casts a spell and is transformed back to his home. He then transports himself back to the forest and, after meeting several ghommids, finds himself head to head with Agbako, a sixteen-eyed monster and they begin to fight. Agbako opens a hole in the earth and Akara-Ogun falls through, finding himself trapped in a house of ghommids. A woman named Helpmeet appears to him and leads him through an opening to the City of Filth. Here Akara-ogun falls in love with a woman called Iwapede but she dies of a sudden illness. Upon her death, he enters a room in their house that she had previously forbidden him to enter and finds himself back in his old home, which is now full of money.

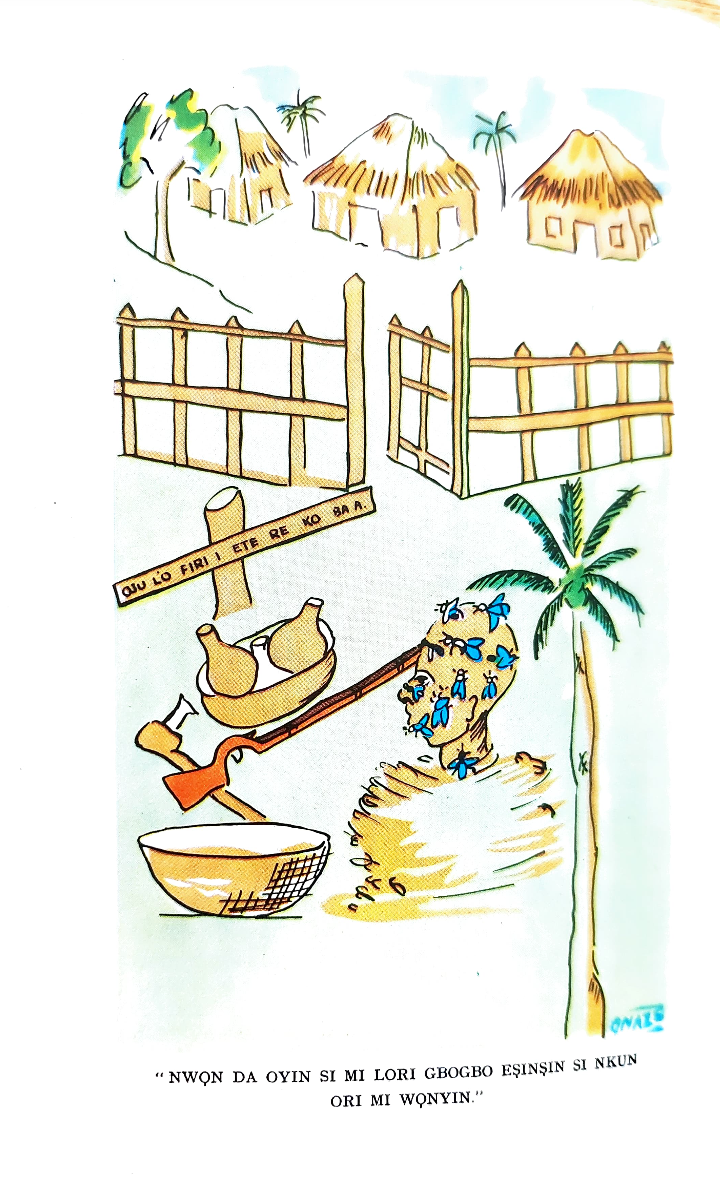
Akara-Ogun buried up to his head by the angry townspeople. Illustration from the Nelson edition of the book, first published in 1950.

A year later, Akara-Ogun decides to return to Irunmale, where he is captured by a man covered in scales like a fish. Akara-Ogun prays to God for his release and the following morning manages to kill the man by tricking him into thinking that he could make water flow from the barrel of his gun. Akara-Ogun then settles in a town of ghommids where he becomes good friends with the king. While there, he thwarts two plots to kill the king. The angry townspeople seize him and bury him up to his neck, but rain loosens the soil around him and he escapes. He then comes across a pit filled with dead animals and cannot find his way out until a beautiful woman appears, brings him to a house to recover and then dies herself. Akara-Ogun calls out to his mother who appears and directs him towards a tunnel to escape.

When he emerges, he meets a man named Lamorin, who becomes his friend. One day while living with Lamorin, he meets a ghommid in the form of a woman and marries her. When Lamorin is captured and killed by a ghommid named Tembelekun, Akara-Ogun decides to leave Irunmale but must leave his wife behind as she cannot live in the world of humans.

Akara-Ogun is now a wealthy man in his town but one day, the king asks him if he will journey to Mount Langbodo to recover a famed object which is said to bring peace and wellbeing to any king's domain. Akara-Ogun gathers six other heroes. After overcoming many travails, including tasks set by Ostrich in the City of Birds and another encounter with Agbako, the group arrive at Mount Langbodo. The king sends them to stay at the home of a wise man named Iragbeje for seven days, who imparts lessons about children, immoderacy, kindness and respect for God. Following this, the king sends the men home with great riches and a letter to their king stating that for his kingdom to prosper, his citizens must love themselves and each other. On the journey home, several of the heroes are separated from the group so only Akara-Ogun, Imodoye and Olohun-iyo return to the town. The king rejoices to see them and is overjoyed by the letter from the king of Mount Langbodo.

Having finished his tale, Akara-Ogun disappears.

== Characters ==
- Author
- Akara-ogun (Compound of Spells) - Protagonist
- Olori-igbo (Lord of the Forests) - King of the ghommids
- Agbako - a sixteen-eyed monster
- Iranlowo (Helpmeet) - a spirit of God
- Iwapede - Akara-ogun's love from the City of Filth
- Ijamba (Peril) - a giant man
- Aroni - one-legged ghommid
- Kurumbete - an angel who rebelled against God and was cast from Heaven
- Tembelekun - a ghommid with four eyes, six arms and two horns
- Eru (Fear) - a strange creature with four heads of different animals
- Ostrich - king of the City of Birds
- Were-orun (Lunatic of Heaven) - a terrible creature that had been sent by God to live in the city of Birds
- Egbin - a disgusting stinking man who lures Oto, the young brother of Aramada-okunrin away with him
- Keke-okun - the brother of Olohun-iyo who is lured towards the dome of heaven by beautiful singing and never seen again
- Iragbeje - the wise man of Mount Langbodo

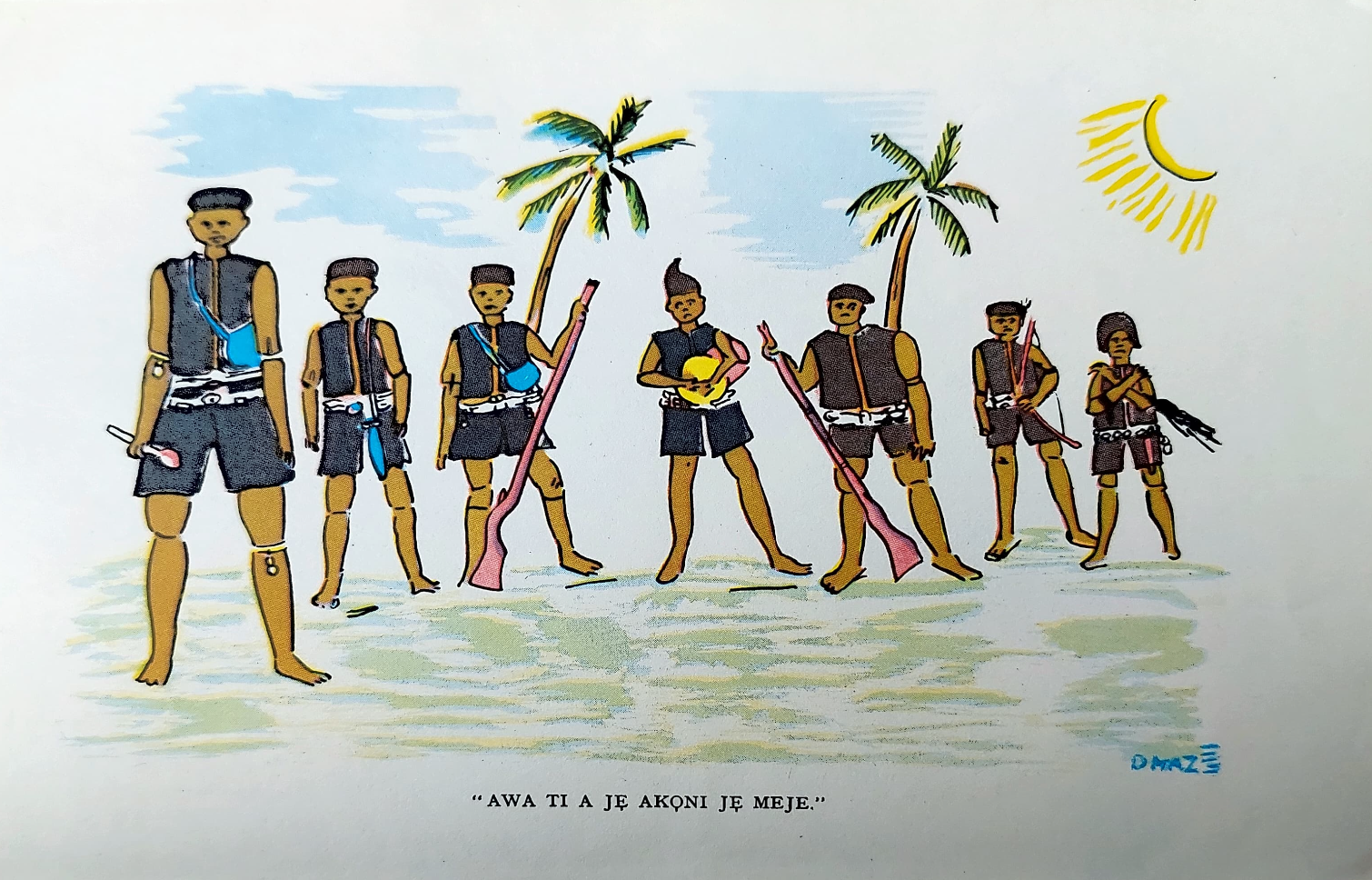
The Seven Heroes. Illustration from the Nelson edition of the book, first published in 1950.

=== The seven heroes who journey to Mount Langbodo ===
- Akara-ogun
- Kako of the Leopard Club - a great hunter whose parents were ghommids
- Imodoye (knowledge fuses with understanding) - a hunter and charm caster who lived with the Whirlwind from ages 10–17
- Olohun-iyo (the Voice of Flavours) - a singer and drummer, the most handsome man on earth
- Elegbede-Ode (father of the baboon) - a strongman born with three eyes, who was raised by baboons
- Efoiye - an archer with feathers growing from his body instead of hair
- Aramada-okunrin (Miraculous Man) - a relative of Efoiye, who felt hot when it was cold and vice versa
