= Raheem Adejumo =

Nigerian philanthropist and sports administrator (Born 1920)

Raheem Akande Adejumo was a Nigerian philanthropist, businessman and administrator. He was president of the Nigerian Olympic Committee from 1987 to 1997 and head of the country's mission in the Olympic, Commonwealth and All-Africa Games during the period.

== Early life and education ==
Born in Benin republic in 1920, his secondary education was at Methodist School, Olowogbowo, Lagos, Nigeria and Government School, Okesuna, Nigeria.

== Career ==
At the age of 20, he joined the police force and served the department for twelve years. Thereafter, he founded Adejumo Fam Brothers, trading assorted items such as gramophone records and decorative wares out of his store along with Breadfruit in Lagos. The firm later expanded into importation of caustic soda and other industrial and water treatment chemicals.

From 1974, Adejumo served as head of the Nigerian Lawn Tennis Association for 15 years and became one of the leading promoters of tennis in the country. Adejumo as chairman of the Nigerian Lawn Tennis Association was involved in the promotion of the 1976 Lagos WCT.

He was president of the tennis association in 1988 before he was appointed head of the Nigerian Olympic Committee. As president of the NOC, Adejumo's era was known for the organization's independence and fund-raising efforts.
