= Oríkì =

Type of praise poetry in the Yoruba culture

Oríkì, or praise poetry, is a cultural phenomenon amongst Yoruba-speakers of West Africa.

== Characteristics ==
Oríkì includes both single praise names and long strings of “attributive epithets” that may be chanted in poetic form. According to the Yoruba historian Samuel Johnson, oriki expresses what a child is or what he or she is hoped to become. If one is male, a praise name is usually expressive of something heroic, brave or strong. If one is female, the praise name may be a term of endearment. In either case, the Reverend Johnson said that it was intended to have a stimulating effect on its bearer.

Because of the variety of performance modes, oríkì defies classification as music or poetry, and it has been studied from both perspectives. Historically, oríkì was delivered by a specialist in a particular vocal style. For example, ìjálá is acoustically open and intense, while ewì is spoken in a high-falsetto, wailing voice quality. According to Waterman, “The words that placate gods and drive kings to suicide [are] made more potent by the patterning of timbre, texture, pitch, and rhythm.” According to Vidal, Yorùbás have oríkì for “almost everything . . . even food”.

The oríkì varies in length depending on whether it is the name given to a child to describe the future portents of the life or a recital of the accomplishments of a person's clan. It is invoked to praise a child for bringing pride to the parents or to attempt to evoke virtuous character traits of bravery, fortitude and perseverance that are believed to be innate in a person by pedigree.

It is not always clear what was pre-eminent in the mind of the person who named a child with the shorter praise name. Predetermined names based on the circumstances of birth are called Oríkì ṣókí, such as the names for twins: Táiyé and Kẹ́hìndé. Traditionally, a boy born with the umbilical cord around his neck is called Òjó (there are exceptions; the Ijebu subculture names a boy or girl Àìná), but the name Òjó has praise poetry that does not even mention that but implies that the child would be the darling of ladies and might be a little impatient.

Praising gods and mortals has traditionally been the focus for singers and the most engaging for audiences, whether the tone is persuasive or controversial. Nigerian politicians often hire well-known singers to elaborate on their heritage. Today, Nigerian Christians and Muslims use oriki to praise sing for the Abrahamic god. They may pray for salvation if they hear the praise of indigenous Yorùbá gods such as Ògún because many of them believe that traditional Yorùbá deities are demonic. Nigerian-American author Luvvie Ajayi wrote in her book that she has written long form orikis for several notable people that she admires. Ajayi urged that people should have an oriki regardless of skill or notability, with self-love being seen as beneficial to having an oriki.

== Examples ==
=== Short form ===
Examples of oríkì names and their meanings (F or M indicates whether the name is usually female or male):

- Àjọké (F) - meant to be taken care of by all.
- Àlàkẹ́ (F) - to take care of her as a result of victory over circumstance.
- Àníkẹ́ (F) - had (birthed) to be pampered.
- Àsàkẹ́ (F) - selected to be spoiled (with good things)
- Àbẹ̀ní (F) - begged for (from God or, more traditionally, the gods).
- Àríkẹ́ (F) - meant to be spoiled on sight.
- Àdùkẹ́ (F) - people will fight over the privilege to spoil her.
- Àdùbí (M/F) - competed over to have
- Àbẹ̀bí (F) - begged for to be birthed (probably a difficult birth).
- Àjàní (M) - fought to have this child, valuable and cherished son
- Àkànní (M) - met only once to have this child.
- Àjàgbé (M) - fought to carry this child.
- Àkànde Àgàn (M) - favourite of the prince.
- Àdìgún (M) - the perfect one .
- Àpèkẹ́ (F) - Called to be cared for and cherish
- Àdùnní (F) - One sweet to have
- Àmọ̀kẹ́ (F) - Known about and cared for
- Àjàdí (M) - the end of conflict
- Àríyọ̀(M) - One that brings joy on sight
- Àṣàbí (F) - selected to be born
- Àtàndá (M) - lured to be created
- Àyọ̀ká (F) - One who causes joy
- Àtúnkẹ́ (F) - One who would continually be taken care of

=== Long form ===
Usually, a family derives its surname from a strong, accomplished patriarch or matriarch, and it is common to find the latter's accomplishments recited in the longer version of the oríkì of all progeny. An excerpt from praise poetry for the name Òjó would be:

Ojo o si nle, omo adie d'agba
t'o ba wa nle, a ti pa e je....

When Ojo is not home, the chick grows to become a hen, if he was at home, he would have made soup of it.

Another particularly fine example of an excerpt from a family's oriki is that of the Supreme Court justice Kayode Eso:

Eso Ikoyi, Eso Aduroja, Apara Ogun bi eni pa'le....

Eso of Ikoyi, the One who waits to fight, who finishes off the war with the care of one rubbing paint on a paved wall.

This excerpt highlights Justice Eso's descent from the famous Eso Ikoyi warriors of the medieval period.

== See also ==
- griot
- Isibongo, a similar concept amongst the Bantu of Southern Africa.

== Expanded notation for reference list ==
- Abraham, R. C. (1962). Dictionary of Modern Yoruba. London: Hodder and Stoughton.
- Ajayi, JF Ade; Akinseye-George, Yemi (1962). Kayode Eso: The making of a Judge. Ìbàdàn, Nigeria: Spectrum Books.
- Ajayi, Luvvie (2022). Rising Troublemaker: A Fear-Fighter Manual for Teens. Philomel Books.
- Babalola, S. Adeboye (1966). The Content and Form of Yoruba Ijala. London: Clarendon Press.
- Barber, Karin; Waterman, Christopher (1995). "Traversing the Global and the Local: Fuji Music and Praise Poetry in the Production of Contemporary Yoruba Popular Culture". In Daniel Miller (ed.). Dictionary of Modern Yoruba. London: Routledge. pp. 240–62.
- Carter-Ényì, Aaron (1 January 2018). ""Lùlù fún wọn": Oríkì in Contemporary Culture". Ethnomusicology. 62 (1): 83–103. doi:10.5406/ethnomusicology.62.1.0083. ISSN 0014-1836.
- Johnson, Samuel (1921). The History of the Yorubas: From the Earliest Times to the Beginning of the British Protectorate. London: Cambridge University Press.
- Olatunji, Olatunde O. (1984). Features of Yorùbá Oral Poetry. Ìbàdàn, Nigeria: University Press PLC.
- Vidal, Tunji’ (1969). "Oriki in Traditional Yoruba Music". African Arts. 3 (1): 56–59. doi:10.2307/3334460. JSTOR 3334460.
- Waterman, Christopher A. (1990). Juju: A Social History and Ethnography of an African Popular Music. Chicago: University of Chicago Press.
