= Ìrèké Oníbùdó =

1949 novel by D. O. Fágúnwà

- Author: D. O. Fágúnwà
- Publication date: 1949

Ìrèké Oníbùdó (English translation: The Sugarcane of the Guardian) is the third novel by the Yorùbá author D. O. Fágúnwà, published in 1949 by Thomas Nelson.

== Plot ==
One day, the eponymous hero arrives at the unnamed narrator's house and asks him to write down the events of his life. Before beginning his life story, Ìrèké Oníbùdó tells the tale of Wrestler-cat, who led a life of violence and deception before finally being the victim of deceit himself.

Ìrèké Oníbùdó then moves on to the main story of the novel. He tells of how both his parents died when he was younger, leaving him without any relatives or money. He improves his life by breeding chickens. However, he is forced to flee when he is falsely accused of seducing the wife of the farmer he lives with. He journeys through the town of the deads (Irewesi) to Backward People town (Ero-ehin). There he finds chaos, with people stealing, fighting and killing one another. To escape, he swims out to a ship, however, during a storm, the ship capsizes and Ìrèké Oníbùdó is taken prisoner by the Gargantuan-mermaid. She gives him a series of impossible tasks but Ìrèké Oníbùdó's mother appears to him and with her help, he completes all the tasks. His mother and her heavenly troops then kill the Gargantuan-mermaid and the residents of the palace.

Ìrèké Oníbùdó then comes to a town called Alupayida that is being terrorised by a destructive flying python. The king's daughter, Ifepade, is being sacrificed that day in order to appease the creature. Ìrèké Oníbùdó fights the python, kills it and falls in love with Ifepade. They plan to marry, however, Ìrèké Oníbùdó's enemies spread rumours that he has been sleeping with the queens and the king orders for him to be beaten. Ìrèké Oníbùdó then flees Alupayida. On learning that he has left the town, Ifepade goes in search of her fiancee. She writes and distributes pamphlets about him, which eventually lead him to her. They discover that the king's anger has dissipated and they return to the town. Back at the palace, Ifepade falls ill and dies soon after. Due to his grief, the king becomes physically and mentally unwell.

The king asks Ìrèké Oníbùdó to journey to the home of the famous herbalist Itanforiti in order to find a cure for his ailment, as well as acquire wisdom for the good of the town. Ìrèké Oníbùdó and two herbalists set out on the journey. On their way, they encounters the Mountain of Tribuations, as well as a town populated only by men (Gbayegborun) and another town populated only by women. They find the entrance to Itanforiti's home and are welcomed by him. Itanforiti imparts several lessons. He warns against covetousness and pride and explains that love is the force that binds people together. For each lesson, he includes a tale to illustrate his point. When the men return to Alupayida, the king has died and the town has decided to make Ìrèké Oníbùdó their new king.

Ìrèké Oníbùdó tells the narrator that this is his seventh year on the throne and that three months ago, Adeorun, a spirit he knew, returned to him and instructed him to pass on his life story. As soon as Ìrèké Oníbùdó finishes his story, he and his companions disappear.

== Characters ==
- Narrator
- Ìrèké Oníbùdó - the novel's hero
- Adeorun - a spirit of heaven that both the narrator and Ìrèké Oníbùdó encounter during their lives
- Ìrèké Ayé - Ìrèké Oníbùdó's father
- Ilepa - the king of Irewesi, the city of the dead
- Rikisi-gori-ite - the king of Ero-ehin, Backward People town
- The Gargantuan-Mermaid - the leader of the fishes of the ocean
- Ifepade - the daughter of the King of Alupayida
- Ifepinya - a sister of Ifepade, whose mother plots to get Ìrèké Oníbùdó to marry her
- Itanforiti - a famous herbalist, who resides under the ground
- Ero-okan - a wise man who accompanies Ìrèké Oníbùdó on his journey to Itanforiti
- Kumofehinti - a troublesome man who also accompanies Ìrèké Oníbùdó on his journey to Itanforiti

== Adaptations ==
A film version of Ìrèké Oníbùdó, made under the Yorùbá theatre tradition, was released in 1982. It was produced by Bayo Aderounmu and codirected by Tunde Kelani and Bayo Aderounmu.

The dramatist Fẹmi Ọṣọfisan adapted the novel for the stage as part of the CHAMS (Computer Hardware and Maintenance Services PLC.) Theatre Series. The play toured Ibadan, Akure, Lagos and Abuja in November 2009.

An English translation of Ìrèké Oníbùdó by Alóńgẹ̀ Isaac Olúṣọlá was published by Nelson Publishers Limited in 2019.
