= The Yoruba Travelling Theatre =

The Yoruba Travelling Theater was developed in the 1850s and used a combination of traditional Yoruba art forms with the incorporation of Western performance paradigms. It has been pivotal in the development of the Cinema of Nigeria.

The Yoruba Travelling Theatre has focused on fantastic folktales, farcical social satires, and historical or mythological accounts derived from oral tradition. Plays were performed in the Indigenous Yoruba Languages in an attempt to educate Yoruba children. The Yoruba Travelling Theatre has therefore disseminated Yoruba culture.

== History ==
The Yoruba Travelling Theatre began when three doyens of drama got their start in the theatre; Chief Hubert Ogunde started the first operas, with his "The Garden of Eden and the Throne of God" being performed with success in 1944; Kola Ogunmola debuted his play "Ife Owolabi" (Love of Money) in 1950 and it was published in English translation in 1965, and subsequently "Omuti apa kinni" in 1963 brought Mr. Ogunmola to fame. The third amongst them is Duro Ladipo, who presented the famous stage plays "Oba KO So" (The King did not Hang) and "Eda" (Everyman).

In these feats, each one of these men was more particular about the propagation of Yoruba voices towards the colonial rulership in those days. Culminating in Yoruba Ronu, a phrase used to call the attention of the Yoruba people to deep thinking about self preservation and ethnic propagation.

The success of The Yoruba Travelling Theatre can be measured by the successes of Herbert Ogunde; although he staged his first play "The Garden of Eden and The Throne of God" in 1944, the Theatre group he led became truly famous with their stage play "Strike and Hunger" in 1945, which was produced during the general workers strike of 1945. The Yoruba Travelling Theatre has been an influential precursor of the current Nigerian stage dramatists, aiding to further push the cultural values of the entire Yoruba people.

== Plays performed ==
1. The Garden of Eden and the Throne of God, staged in 1944.
2. Strike and Hunger, staged in 1946. It dramatises the event of the General Workers Strike in 1945.
3. Yoruba Ronu, staged in 1964 during the attack on Chief Ladoke Akintola.
4. The Tiger's Empire, which was also staged earlier in 1946 to give clearance to women to have access to drama. This and the preceding were the major plays of Hubert Ogunde.
5. Ife Owo and Omuti are all plays by Kola Ogunmola. They further reshape the essence of The Yoruba Theatre play.
6. Oba Ko so and Eda by Duro Ladipo.
