= Arinpe Gbekelolu Adejumo =

Professor of Yoruba Language and Literature

Academic background
- Education: Obafemi Awolowo University
- Thesis: “Isẹfẹ Ninu Aṣayan Ere Onitan Yoruba” (Satire In Selected Yoruba Written Plays)

Academic work
- Discipline: Yoruba literature; linguistics
- Institutions: University of Ibadan

Àrìnpé Gbẹ́kẹ̀lólú Adéjùmọ̀ is professor of Yoruba Language and Literature at the University of Ibadan, Nigeria, and an author and playwright. She is known for her scholarship on Yoruba drama, satire, and gender studies.

== Career ==
Adejumo received her PhD from Obafemi Awolowo University, Ile-Ife in 1995. Subsequently, she joined the Ekiti State University as an assistant lecturer. In 2007 she moved to the department of Linguistics and African Languages, University of Ibadan as a senior lecturer. In 2010 she was promoted to the rank of professor, and from 2011 until 2017 she was head of the department of Linguistics and African Languages. Adejumo is currently the Deputy Provost (Academic) of the Postgraduate College of the University of Ibadan.

== Selected publications ==
=== Literary works ===
- (2002) Ròóore. (Think Righty). Lagos: Capstone Publishers.
- (2010) Afàgo Kéyin Àparò (The Partridge's Egg). Lagos: Capstone Publishers.

=== Academic publications ===
- (1991) ‘Political Satire in Olabimtan's Olaore Afotejoye’, in Essays in Honour of Professor Ayo Bamgbose, edited by F.A. Soyoye and L.O. Adewole, pp. 99–103. Ife: Department of African Languages and Literatures.
- (2001) “Isefe Ninu Awon Ere-onitan Yoruba” (Satire In Selected Yoruba Written Plays). CASAS Book Series No. 11. Cape Town: Centre for Advanced Studies of African Society. ISBN 9781919799506
- (2005) ‘Bellowing Against Oppression: A Sociological Appraisal of Atari Ajanaku's Orin Ewuro’, Yoruba: A Journal of Yoruba Studies Association of Nigeria 3: 34–41.
- (2005) ‘Yoruba Philosophical Thought in Satirical Songs: A Functionalist Approach’, Ihafa: A Journal of African Studies 5: 20–32.
- (2007) ‘From the Eagle's Eyes: A Reminiscence of 18th Century Trans-Atlantic Slave Trade in Yoruba Historical Plays’, Studies of Tribes and Tribals 5, 1: 9–14.
- (2008) ‘Satirical Elements in Akinwumi Isola's Drama’, in Emerging Perspective on Akinwumi Isola, edited by Akintunde Akinyemi and Toyin Falola, pp. 49–62. Trenton: Africa World Press.
- (2010) ‘Poetics of Manhood in Etches on Freshwater’, in The Man. The Mask, The Muse edited by Toyin Falola, pp. 929–943. Carolina: Academic Press.
- (2016) Adebowale, O, Adeleke, D. and Adejumo, A. (Eds.) Otun ImoNinu Itan Aroso D.O. Fagunwa. (New Findings in the Novels of D.O. Fagunwa). Lagos: Capstones Publishers.
- (2023). 'Yoruba Culture in a Changing World.' Yoruba Studies Review, 8(1), 1-20. https://doi.org/10.32473/ysr.8.1.134083
