= Thomas Monroe Campbell =

American government official (1883–1956)

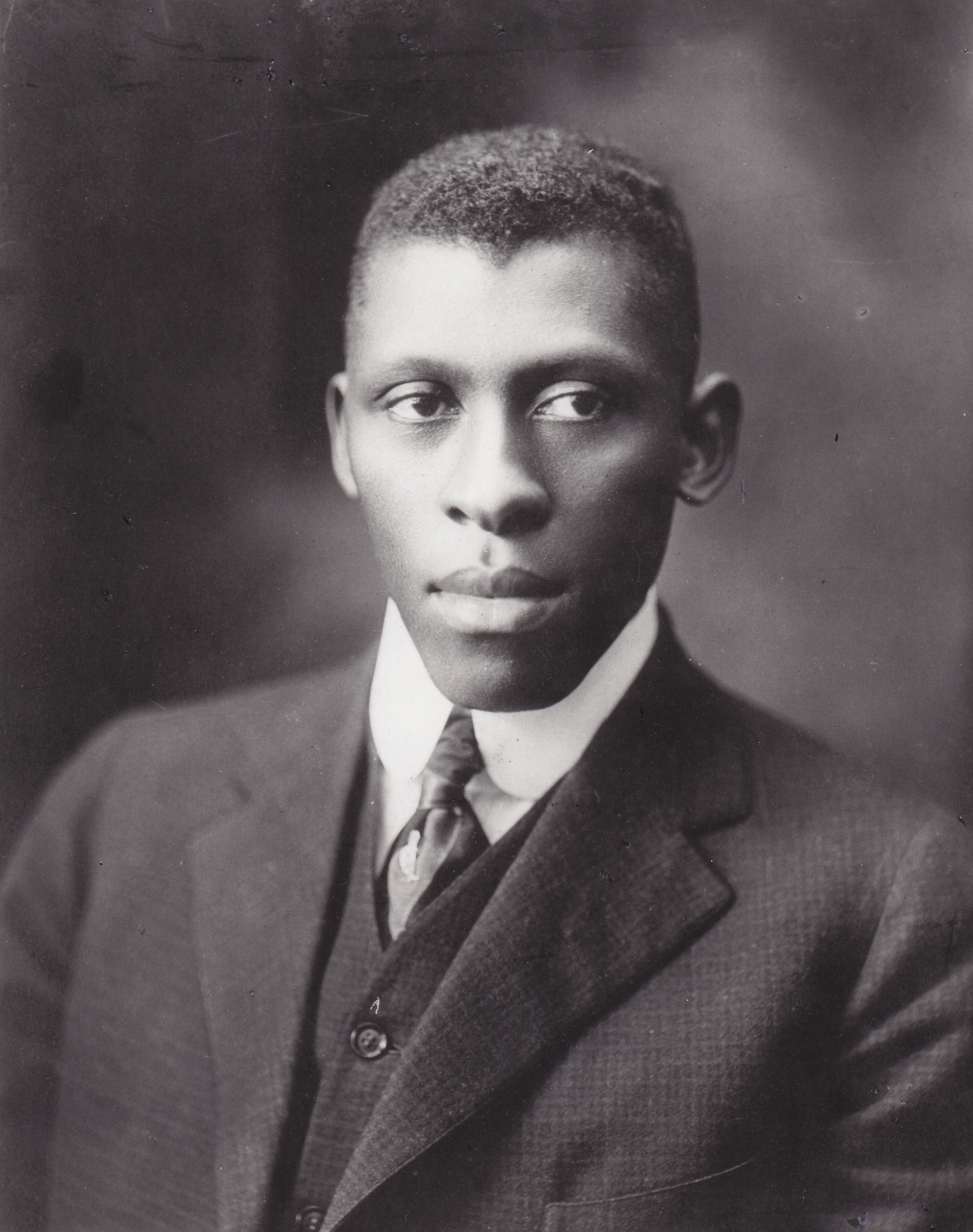
Thomas Monroe Campbell

Thomas Monroe Campbell (1883–1956) was the first Cooperative Extension Agent in the United States and headed the first Extension Program as a field agent for the U.S. Department of Agriculture. Well known for his work under the tutelage of Booker T. Washington and peered with George Washington Carver, Campbell was also the winner of the Harmon Award in 1930 for his service in the field of agriculture. He authored of the book The Movable School Goes to the Negro Farmer. He was a nationally known and well respected public servant of the first rank. A bust of Campbell can be found in the Tuskegee University Library.

Campbell and his wife Anna had six children; their fourth child was Col. William A. Campbell, who became a highly decorated member of the Tuskegee Airmen.

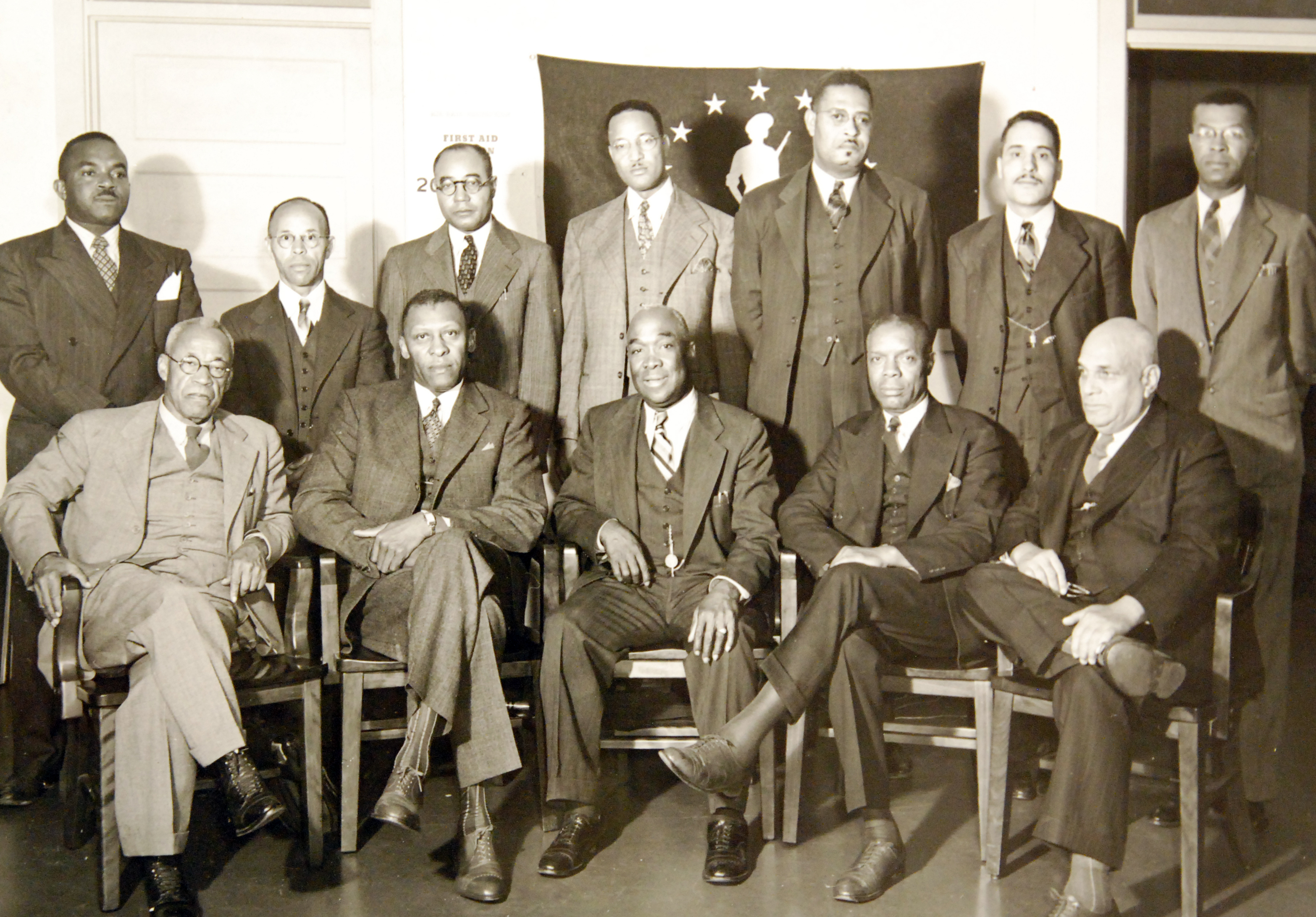

He was among a group of African Americans trained by the Treasury Department to sell war bonds.
