= Hubert Ogunde =

Nigerian actor and playwright

Hubert Adedeji Ogunde
- Born: Hubert Adedeji Ogunde; 10 July 1916; Ososa, Ogun State
- Died: 4 April 1990 (aged 73); London, England
- Citizenship: Nigeria
- Occupations: Playwright, actor
- Spouse: More than 10
- Children: 17
- Writing career
- Period: 1944–1990
- Genres: Drama, satire
- Notable works: Yoruba Ronu, Aiye
- Notable awards: Doctor of Letters from the University of Ife and University of Lagos, Nigeria

Chief Hubert Adedeji Ogunde D.Lit. (//; 10 July 1916 – 4 April 1990) was a Nigerian actor, playwright, theatre manager, and musician who founded the first contemporary professional theatrical company in Nigeria, the African Music Research Party, in 1945.

Hubert Ogunde changed the name to Ogunde Theater Party in 1947 and Ogunde Concert Party in 1950. Finally, in 1960, he changed it to Ogunde Theater, a name that remained until his death in 1990. He has been described as "the father of Nigerian theatre, or the father of contemporary Yoruba theatre".

In his career on stage, he wrote more than 50 plays, most of which incorporate dramatic action, dance, and music, with a story reflecting the political and social realities of the period. His first production was a church-financed play called The Garden of Eden. It premiered at Glover Memorial Hall, Lagos, in 1944. Its success encouraged Ogunde to produce more plays, and he soon left his job with the police force for a career in the theatre.

In the 1940s, he released some plays with political commentaries: The Tiger's Empire, Strike and Hunger and Bread and Bullet. During the 1950s, he toured various Nigerian cities with his travelling troupe. In 1964, he released Yoruba Ronu, a play that generated controversy and earned him the wrath of Chief Akintola, premier of the Western Region.

The Ogunde Theater was banned in the Western Region of Nigeria for two years as a result. This ban was only revoked by the new military government of Lt. Col. F. A. Fajuyi on 4 February 1966.

In the late 1970s, Ogunde was spurred by the success of Ija Ominira and Ajani Ogun, two pioneering Yoruba feature-length films, to co-produce his first celluloid film, Aiye, in 1979. He released Jaiyesimi, Aropin N'tenia, and Ayanmo, feature-length films influenced by Yoruba mysticism, thereafter.

Ogunde starred in Mister Johnson, the 1990 motion picture that also featured Pierce Brosnan. The movie was shot on location in Toro, near Bauchi, Nigeria.

== Early life ==
Ogunde was born in Ososa, in the Odogbolu Local Government Area of Ogun State, Nigeria, to the family of Jeremiah Deinbo and Eunice Owotusan Ogunde. His father was a Baptist pastor, and his maternal grandfather was a priest of Ifa, an African traditional religion. Ogunde briefly lived within the precincts of his grandfather's compound and was exposed to Ifá, Ogun and many other traditional religious celebrations. Both the Christian and traditional religions of the Yoruba influenced his upbringing. He had his education between 1925 and 1932, attending St John School, Ososa, (1925–1928), St Peter's School, Faaji, Lagos, (1928–11930) and Wasimi African School, (1931–1932).

His first contact with performance art was as a member of Egun Alarinjo during his elementary school days. After completing his education, he worked as a pupil-teacher at St. John's School and was also a church choirmaster and organist.

He later joined the Nigerian police force in March 1941 in Ibadan. In 1943, the police force posted him to the Denton Police Station, Ebute Metta, where he joined an African initiated church, the Church of the Lord (Aladura). In Lagos, he created an amateur drama group, the African Music Research Party, in 1945.

Like many of his theatre contemporaries, such as A. B. David, P. A. Dawodu, Layeni and G. T. Onimole, his theatre career began under the patronage of the Church. In 1944, he co-produced his first folk opera with G. B. Kuyinu, The Garden of Eden and The Throne of God, commissioned by the Lagos-based Church of the Lord (Aladura) founded by Josiah Ositelu. The performance was sanctioned to aid contributions to a Church building fund.

The folk opera premiered at Glover Memorial Hall with the chairman of the ceremony, Dr. Nnamdi Azikiwe, in attendance. The play incorporated realism and dramatic action in the acting, dancing, and singing of the performers, separating it from the common Native Air Operas predominant in Yorubaland at the time. This was an innovation that contributed to making it a success.

At the request of the Alake of Abeokuta, Ogunde performed "The Garden of Eden" at the Ake Centenary Hall. Encouraged by the success of the play, he went on to write more operas. He wrote and co-directed three religious-themed plays: Africa and God (1944), a folk opera infused with Yoruba cultural themes that was non-existent in The Garden of Eden, Israel in Egypt (1945) and Nebuchadnezzar's Reign and Belshazzar's Feast (1945). In 1946, he resigned his post with the police to become a professional dramatist.

== Career ==
=== Beginning of stage career: folk operas ===
As has already been stated, Ogunde's African Music Research Party, founded in 1945, was the first contemporary professional theatre company in Yorubaland. Previous performance groups were masked theatre troupes called Alarinjo who were dependent on the court or church for support and who grew in popularity as a result of word of mouth. Ogunde distinguished his group by using promotion methods such as advertisements and posters and by changing the round stage used by alarinjo performers to one with a proscenium. In addition, he introduced dramatic action and realism in his plays, depending on the audience for commercial support. Through these acts, Ogunde began the rise of modern professional theatre in Nigeria, a movement in which he remains the most influential practitioner.

After leaving his job as a police constable, Ogunde moved away from his earlier focus on religious themes and started writing plays that were nationalistic and anti-colonial in outlook, a trend in Lagos during the furious forties. During this period, many of his early operas were co-directed by G. B. Kuyinu.

In early 1945, he produced Worse than Crime, a political play infused with Yoruba dance and ancient folk songs. Like most of his early plays, it premiered at Glover Memorial Hall, Lagos. Later in that year, he wrote The Black Forest and Journey to Heaven, two Yoruba operas that also improved his use of traditional Yoruba folklore. The latter also had a strong Christian influence. In November 1945, he wrote a pro-labour play, Strike and Hunger, motivated by the events of a general strike by labour unions led by Michael Imoudu. In 1946 he wrote and produced Tiger's Empire. Premiering on 4 March 1946, Tiger's Empire was produced by The African Music Research Party and featured Ogunde, Beatrice Oyede, and Abike Taiwo. The advertisement for the play was the result of Ogunde's call for "paid actresses". It marked the first time in Yoruba theatre that women were billed to appear in a play as professional artists in their own right. Tiger's Empire was an attack on colonial rule. He followed Tiger's Empire with Darkness and Light.

Later, in 1946, he produced Devil's Money, an African story about a man who entered into a contract with an evil spirit so in an effort to get rich. The folk opera was successful and had a set of twenty-four actors donning costumes. After the death of Herbert Macaulay, he wrote the opera Herbert Macaulay to commemorate the life of the nationalist, who died in 1946. He then released another politically-themed play, Towards Liberty, in 1947. Before 1948, Ogunde's plays were staged in Lagos and occasionally in Abeokuta, but his growing popularity in other Western Nigeria provinces made him think about traveling to other cities with his theatre troupe.

In 1948, he went on a tour of major Western Nigerian cities with his group, including stops at Abeokuta, Ibadan, Oyo, Ede and Ogbomosho. When he took his tour to the north, he had two major encounters with the police there due to the political content of Worse than Crime and Tiger's Empire. His first tour outside Nigeria was not well received by the Ghanaian audience, largely because they did not understand the Yoruba language and Ogunde was ignorant about the tastes of the people.

Ogunde then wrote his first satire, Human Parasites, about the craze for Aso ebi (a social culture which encourages both men and women to buy the most expensive materials for social gatherings). “The custom has lent itself to much abuse in that the occasions for celebrating marriages and funerals occur so often that one may be asked by friends to buy ‘Aso Ebi’ more than ten times a year”. "Human Parasites" lampooned the fashionable socialites of Lagos, but many of them were Ogunde's patrons. Around the time that he wrote Human Parasites, he first changed the name of his troupe to Ogunde Theatre Party. Ogunde's plays from this period were folk operas in which the actors on stage sang their lines with limited dialogue.

In 1947, Ogunde and Adesuwa, his wife and frequent co-star, traveled to London to make contacts with theatre agents for the promotion of his shows in England. The talks were not fruitful, but while in London, they had the opportunity to take waltz and tap dance classes. In his later operas, he syncretized the waltz with the traditional Batakoto dance and tap dance with the traditional Epa dance.

=== 1950s–1960s ===
In 1950, Ogunde continued writing plays with political undertones. Bread and Bullet, first performed in 1950, is a play about the coal miners' strike in Enugu that resulted in the shooting of twenty-two people in that year. In Northern Nigeria, the performance of the play was limited to certain areas due to allegations of seditious dialogue. It was during this time that Ogunde introduced the English language to the dialogue of his plays. In January 1950, he staged a reproduction of his 1945 play Black Forest, re-arranging the play to introduce English and Yoruba dialogue. The African music featured was created by both Western and African instruments. The re-produced Black Forest and Bread and Bullet changed his style of drama from Yoruba folk opera to an improvisational theatre where dialogue is spoken.

Ogunde then released a string of plays with dialogue either spoken or sung. He released an Islamic morality tale, My Darling Fatima, in 1951. He followed this with three situational comedies: Portmanteau Woman (1952), Beggar's Love (1952) and Princess Jaja (1953).

In 1955, his theatre went on a tour of Northern Nigeria that included performances at the Colonial Hotel, Kano. During this time, Ogunde ceased to write as often as he did in order for him to be able to go on grueling road tours to different parts of the country. The Ogunde Theatre Party became a traveling theatre group thereafter. He also changed the name of the group, from Ogunde Theatre Party to Ogunde Concert Party, in 1950.

In 1964, he produced two important plays: Yoruba Ronu and Otitokoro. They both spoke of the political events in Western Nigeria, events which led to the declaration of a state of emergency in 1963. He was the most prominent of the dramatists of the folk opera. He composed over 40 operas in Yoruba. His play Yoruba Ronu (or "Yoruba Think") was a satirical account of the strife that plagued Yorubaland in the 1960s. The protagonist of the play, Oba Fiwajoye, is betrayed by the actions of his deputy. He is given over into the hands of his enemy, Yeye-Iloba, leading to the imprisonment of him and two of his political allies. The deputy then ascends the throne and rules as a tyrant before he is eventually killed by the people.

The play was staged at an Egbe Omo Olofin meeting in the presence of NNDP leaders such as Akintola. During the performance, Akintola and a few others walked out, feeling it was a subtle attack on their role in the Western region crisis. It was banned in western Nigeria for two years (1964 to 1966) as a result, but was produced with great success in other parts of the country.

In the 1960s, The advent of Western Nigeria Television (WNTV) gave Ogunde an avenue to reach his audience without traveling. He produced his plays Ayanmo and Mama Eko for the television audience.

Ogunde was a representative of Nigeria at Expo 67 in Montreal. On his way back to Nigeria, he stopped in New York and performed at the Apollo Theater in Harlem.

=== Celluloid years ===
In the late 1970s, film director Ola Balogun directed two successful Yoruba films. The first, "Ajani Ogun", was co-produced with the actor Ade Love. The second, "Ija Ominira", starred Ade Love. Ogunde decided to join the trend. He invited Ola Balogun to direct Aiye, an adaptation of one of his stage plays. Ogunde chose the play partly because it attracted crowds during its run of performances. Unlike the stage act, the film was shot in such a way as to allow for a sequel. The film premiered in 1979, and within a year it had made its money back. Aiye explored Yoruba mysticism, the issue of witchcraft and traditional notions of light and darkness.

Ogunde sold some of his properties to finance the movie. The next Ogunde film was Jaiyesinmi, a sequel to Aiye co-directed by Ogunde and Freddie Goode. His third film was Aropin N'Tenia, another adaptation of a stage play which had premiered in 1964. The film had fewer mystical symbols than those that preceded it. Ogunde provided the funds for the production of all of his movies without exception. His fourth film was Ayanmo, originally adapted from a play that had been dedicated to his wife, Adeshewa, who had died previously.

Ogunde established a film village in Ososa, his hometown, to serve as a film shooting studio for his films in 1982. His last two films, Aropin N'tenia and Ayanmo were shot at the Ogunde film village.

=== Music albums ===
Ogunde released many music albums during his career. His distinctive voice marked the songs in these albums which, like his plays and films, demonstrated knowledge of the Yoruba ethos. The albums included Ekun Oniwogbe (about the human conscience), Onimoto (about motor drivers) and Adeshewa (about the loss of his wife and co-star, who died in a tragic accident). The most popular of his albums is Yoruba Ronu, a soundtrack to the play of the same name. He produced over 90 songs in a creative life that stretched from the late 1950s to 1988. From the 1960s onwards, he produced a soundtrack album for each play.

=== Ogunde Estate and national troupe ===
In 1986, he was invited by the Nigerian government to form a national drama troupe. During this time, he represented Nigeria in the Commonwealth Festival of Arts, performing a play called Destiny (which was a re-arranged Ayanmo that he had released earlier in 1970). Destiny was a production with thirty dancers. In the play, Ogunde incorporated some of his favorite dance steps, Ijo-Eleja (or the dance of the fishermen), Asan Ubo-Ikpa from the Ibibio culture, and the kwag-hir from Tivland.

Ogunde established an estate at Ososa. The venue served as the rehearsal center for the national troupe before his passing in 1990.

== Personal life and legacy ==
Ogunde married more than ten wives and had many children. The Ogunde Theater was largely a family-run business, and all the wives and children took part in the productions at one time or the other. Some of the children were actors and actresses, while others were drummers, singers and ticket sellers. All of the wives shared the stage with their husband at various points in the history of the theatre.

The manager of the Ogunde Theater, who also happened to be one of the wives, was the former Miss Clementina Oguntimirin. She later became known as Adeshewa Clementina Ogunde or Mama Eko, taking the latter moniker from the popular 1960s play of the same name that she starred in. His other wives included Ibisomi Ogunde, Risikat Ogunde and Emily Kehinde Olukoga-Ogunde.

Ogunde became the leading producer of Yoruba celluloid movies, with J'ayesinmi (Let the world rest) and Aiye (Life!), blazing the trail.

He was ill during the shooting of the film "Mr. Johnson". Chief Ogunde died on 4 April 1990, at London's Cromwell Hospital following a brief illness.

A portrait of Ogunde hangs in the National Gallery of Modern Art, Lagos.

During his life he had been honoured with a chieftaincy title, thus making him an Oloye of the Yoruba people.

Hubert Ogunde Memorial School Akute was founded (1995) by his daughter, Abosede Ogunde Oloyede, in memory of the Late. Chief (Dr.) Hubert Ogunde.

== Work ==
=== Plays ===
- Garden of Eden and the Throne of God (1944)
- Africa and God (1944)
- Israel in Egypt (1945)
- Nebuchadnezzar's Reign and Belshazzar's Feast (1945)
- King Solomon (1945)
- Worse than Crime (1945)
- Journey to Heaven (1945)
- The Black Forest (Igbo Irunmale) (1945)
- Strike and Hunger (1945)
- Tiger's Empire (1946)
- Darkness and Light (1946)
- Mr. Devil's Money (Ayinde) (1946)
- Herbert Macaulay (1946)
- Human Parasites (1946)
- Towards Liberty (1947)
- Swing the Jazz (1947)
- Yours Forever (Morenike) (1948)
- Half and Half (1949)
- Gold Coast Melodies (1949)
- Bread and Bullet (1950)
- My Darling Fatima (1951)
- Portmanteau Woman (1952)
- Beggar's Love (1952)
- Highway Eagle (1953)
- Princess Jaja (1953)
- Village Hospital (Ile Iwosan) (1957)
- Delicate Millionaire (Olowo Ojiji) (1958)
- Songs of Unity (1960)
- Yoruba Ronu (1964)
- Aropin N'tenia (1964)
- Otito Koro (1964)
- Awo Mimo (1965)
- Ire Olokun (1968)
- Keep Nigeria One (1968)
- Mama Eko (1968)
- Oba nta (1969)
- Ogun Pari (1969)
- Oh, Ogunde (1969)
- Ewe Nla (1970)
- Iwa gbemi (1970)
- Ayanmo (1970)
- Onimoto (1971)
- K'ehin Sokun (1971)
- Aiye (1972)
- Ekun Oniwogbe (1974)
- Ewo Gbeja (1975)
- Muritala Mohamed (1976)
- Oree Niwon (1976)
- Nigeria (1977)
- Igba t' ode (1977)
- Orisa N'la (1977)

=== Films ===
- Aiye (1980)
- Jaiyesimi (1981)
- Aropin (1982) as Oba Fiwajoye
- Ayanmo (1988) as Osetura
- Mister Johnson (1990) as Brimah

=== Television ===
- Ogunde: Man of the Theatre – BBC (1983)

== Sources ==
- Clark, Ebun (1979). Hubert Ogunde: the making of Nigerian theatre. Oxford UNiversity Press.
- Asobele, Timothy (2003). Yoruba cinema of Nigeria. Lagos: Upper Standard Publications.
