= Anu Afolayan =

Nigerian film composer

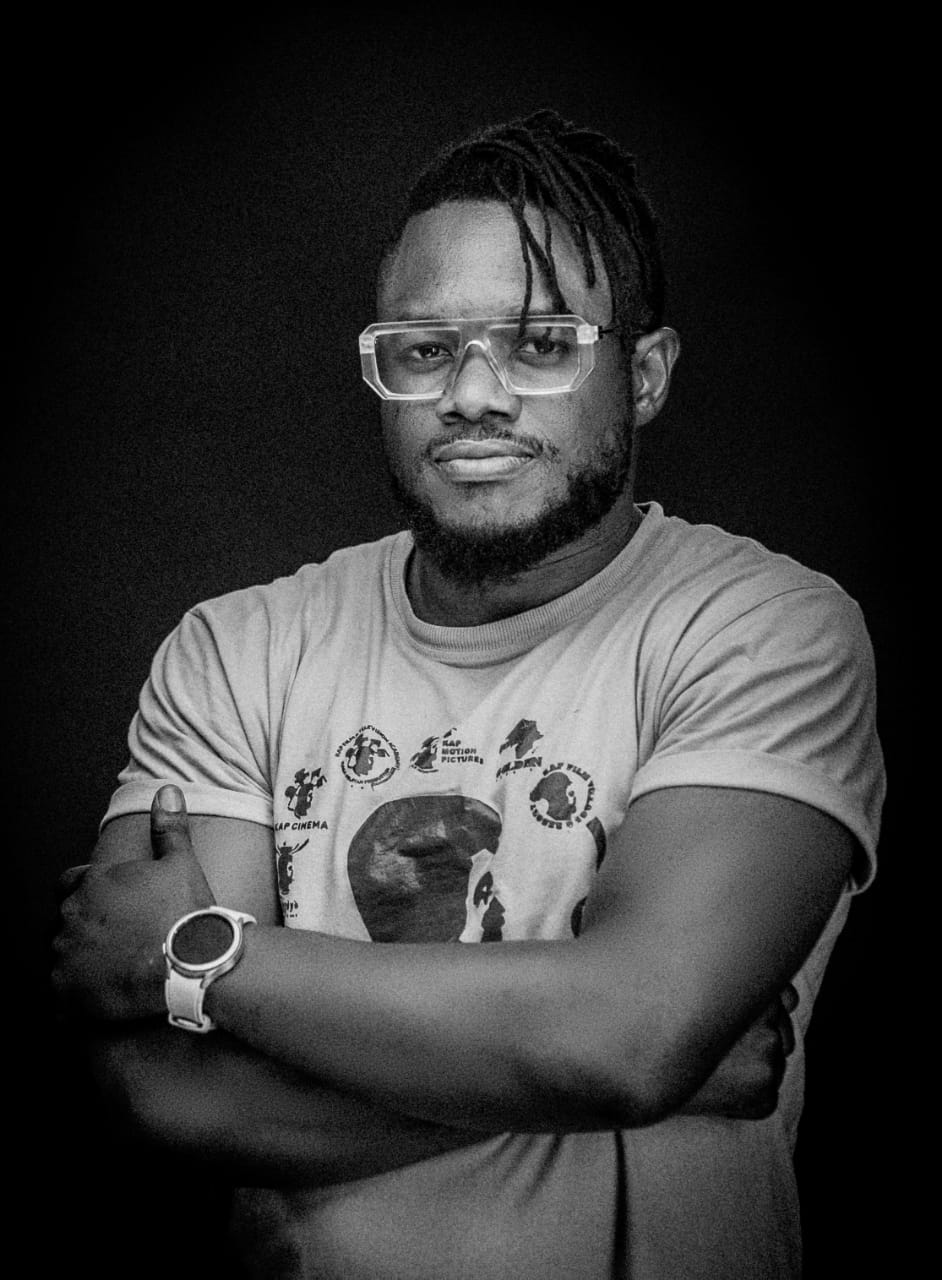
- Born: Anu Kayode Afolayan; 21 February; Lagos State, Nigeria
- Citizenship: Nigerian
- Occupations: Film composer; sound editor; record producer
- Years active: 2015–present
- Organization: Arke Studios
- Known for: Film Music
- Father: Adeyemi Josiah Afolayan (Ade Love - father)
- Family: Moji Afolayan (sister); Gabriel Afolayan (brother); Aremu Afolayan (brother Kunle Afolayan (brother)
- Awards: Best Sound Editor, AMVCA 2023

Anu Afolayan is a Nigerian composer and sound editor who worked on the films Aníkúlápó, Citation and Mokalik.

== Life and career ==
Afolayan made his debut as a composer in the film Hanutu directed by Kunle Afolayan and won the best sound editor award for the movie Aníkúlápó at the 2023 Africa Magic Viewers Choice Awards.

== Filmography ==
=== As Composer ===
- Mokalik (2019)
- Citation (2020)
- Swallow (2021)
- Aníkúlápó (2023)

== Awards and nominations ==
Year	Result	Award	Category	Work
2021	Won	AMAA	Best Soundtrack	Citation
2023	Won	AMVCA	Best Sound Editor	Anikulapo
