= Toyin Afolayan =

Nigerian film actress (born 1959)

- Born: 24 September 1959 (age 66)
- Other names: Lola Idije
- Occupation: Actress
- Notable work: Deadly Affair
- Relatives: Adeyemi Afolayan

Toyin Afolayan (born September 24, 1959) popularly known as Lola Idije is a Nigerian film actress. She gained recognition after starring as Madam Adisa in a 1995 film titled Deadly Affair.

Toyin Afolayan is known as the initiator of popular internet slangs Soro Soke werey and Pele My Dear. Soro Soke Werey is a term used by #EndSars protesters in Nigeria to demand that government speak up and louder on the excesses of the SARS Police unit in the country.

== Biography ==
Toyin Afolayan is an indigene of Agbamu, Kwara State in Southwest Nigeria. She is the cousin of Adeyemi Afolayan (aka Ade Love) and his children, Nigerian film actors Kunle Afolayan, Gabriel Afolayan, Aremu Afolayan and Moji Afolayan. Toyin started acting in the '80s due to the influence of Ade Love. She has remained active in Nollywood till date, featuring more in Yoruba movies.

The veteran actress has been in the movie industry for about three decades in which she rose to fame in 1995 for her role as Mama Adisa in the movie 'Deadly Affair'

== Personal life ==
Toyin Afolayan is a widow, a mother of three female children and a grandmother. Her only son died at infancy. Toyin Afolayan was recently named the brand ambassador of Boalas Homes and Gardens

== Selected filmography ==
- Glimpse (2020)
- Arojinle (2018)
- Ojuloge Obirin (2017)
- Irapada (2006)
- Deadly Affair (1995) as Madam Adisa
- Ayomida (2003) as Judge
- Botife (2004) as Ajibike
- Osunwon Eda (2006)
- Idunnu mi (2007)
- Taiwo Taiwo (2008) as Egbon Joke
- Elewon (2009) as Iya Aliah
- Olokiki oru: The Midnight Sensation (2019) as Olori
- Anikulapo (2022) as Oyo Chief

== See also ==
- List of Nigerian actors
