= Africa International Film Festival =

Film festival held in Nigeria

- AFRIFF official logo
- Location: Lagos, Nigeria
- Founded: 2010
- Founded by: Chioma Ude
- Awards: Globe Awards
- Artistic director: Ikenna Ezenyirioha
- Language: International
- Website: www.afriff.com

The Africa International Film Festival (AFRIFF) is an annual film festival that takes place during November in Lagos, Nigeria. It is the country's largest film festival. Founded in 2010 by Chioma Ude, the week-long event promotes African and diasporic cinema through screenings, awards, professional development and the AFRIFF Film and Content Market, which facilitates the buying and selling of film and television content.

== History ==
In 2010, Chioma Ude, a Nigerian marketing professional, founded AFRIFF. While serving as project manager for the ION International Film festival—a global touring festival that she brought to Nigeria—she identified a gap for a local film festival that showcased African and Diasporan cinema. The inaugural festival of AFRIFF was held in Port Harcourt with Peace Anyam-Osigwe as its creative director. Thirteen films, including two from Nigeria, made the official selection. In 2011 the festival took place in Lagos. That year 180 films were submitted, out of which 63 were selected. The first two editions presented five awards, known as the Globe Awards: Best Feature Film, People’s Choice Award, Best Short Film, Best Documentary, and Best Animation.

In 2013 AFFRIF's 3d edition was held in Calabar, Cross River State with Keith Shiri assuming the role of creative director. 70 films were screened from a total of 200 submissions. Starting with this edition, the number of awards and prizes started to expand progressively, reaching a total of eighteen by 2025, including categories for directing, acting, screenwriting, as well as awards recognizing international and student talent.

Following another edition hosted in Calabar in 2014, the festival relocated permanently to Lagos for its 2015 edition, where it has since been held annually, except in 2020, when it was disrupted by the COVID-19 pandemic.

For its 10th edition in 2021 AFRIFF received a record-breaking 4,000 film submissions from more than 100 countries, of which 150 were screened. The following year, AFRIFF partnered with the Red Sea International Film Festival to introduce the Saudi based festival and its Red Sea Fund to African and Diasporan filmmakers. The 2022 edition received 500 film submissions from the Middle East.

In 2023, 2000 films were submitted from over 100 countries for AFRIFF's 12th edition. That year AFRIFF partnered with the African Export Import Bank (Afreximbank) through its Creative Africa Nexus (CANEX) in developing "Script to Screen", a year-long capacity-building intervention aimed at African filmmakers.

In 2025, AFRIFF showcased 90 films, with 47 of them in competition. During the 14th edition AFRIFF debuted the ARIFF Film and Content Market (AFCM) in partnership with Nigeria’s Federal Ministry of Art, Culture, Tourism, and Creative Economy (FMACCE). AFCM is Nigeria’s first official marketplace for African film and creative content, providing a platform where filmmakers, distributors, investors, and buyers can connect to facilitate content licensing, co-productions, and distribution agreements. Dennis Ruh, a former European Film Market director served as the lead consultant. In addition to FMACCE, other partners supporting AFCM in its inaugural edition included MTN, Goldfinch, SOOP, SPCINE, and the Lagos State Government.

In 2026, Cannes' Marché du Film selected AFFRIF as one of seven international festivals invited to curate their own pitch sessions for films in post-production to sales agents, distributors, and festival programmers. On May 16, AFRIFF presented five African titles from Nigeria, South Africa and Rwanda in the Marché du Film's "Goes to Cannes" program.

== Editions ==
=== 2010 Africa International Film Festival ===
The 2010 Africa International Film Festival was held in Port Harcourt from 1 December 2010 to 5 December 2010. The festival followed after its first official announcement at the 6th Africa Movie Academy Awards. The five-day event featured several activities that included workshop, screenings, film premiere, awards night and a fashion show. The event featured performances from P-Square and Duncan Mighty. The theme for the year was "Africa Unites". Eligible submissions must have been produced after 1 January 2009 and submitted before 31 August 2010.

==== Award winners ====
Award	Winner
Best People's Choice Award	Working Girl by Nigel Trellis (Antigua and Barbuda)
Best Animation	URS by Montz Mayerhofer (Germany)
Best Short Film	Pumzi by Wanuri Kahiu (Kenya)
Best Documentary	Stolen by Daniel FallShaw (Australia)
Best Feature Film	Soul Boy by Hawa Essuman (Kenya/Germany)

=== 2011 Africa International Film Festival ===
The 2011 Africa International Film Festival took place from 30 November 2011 to 3 December 2011 in Lagos. The event was sponsored by Arik Air and submissions were open from March 30 to July 30, 2011. Leila Djansi's Ties That Bind opened the ceremony with its premiere at Genesis Deluxe Cinemas. The event was anchored by Rita Dominic and IK Osakioduwa. Lynn Whitfield was the ambassador of the festival. P-Square performed at the Oriental Hotel on the final day of the event.

==== Award winners ====
Award	Winner
Best Animation	Le Parrain by lazare sie Pale (Burkina Faso)
People's Choice Award	The Education of Auma Obama by Branwen Okpako (Kenya)
Best Short Film	Blissi N'Diaye by Nicolas Sawaco (France)
Best Documentary	The Unbroken Spirit by Monica Wangu Wamwere (Kenya)
Best Feature Film	Aramotu by Niji Akanni (Nigeria)

=== 2013 Africa International Film Festival ===
The 2013 Africa International Film Festival was held from 10 November to 17 November 2013 at Tinapa, Cross River. The event was hosted by Darey Art Alade and TV personality, Michelle Dede. The event was sponsored by UBA. South African film Of Good Report won the Best Feature Film.

==== Award winners ====
Award	Winner
Best Feature Film	Of Good Report (South Africa)
President's Best Authentic Nigerian Film	The Meeting by Mildred Okwo
Best Director	Roberta Durrant for Felix
Best Film Screenplay	iNumber Number
Best Actor	Desmond Elliot (Lies Men Tell)
Best Actress	Uche Jombo (Lies Men Tell)
Special Jury Mention	Rita Dominic and Omoni Oboli
Best Student Film	Sodiq by Adeyemi Michael
Best Short Film	Adamt by Zalem Worldmariam (Ethiopia)
Special Jury Mention	Beleh by Eka Christa Assam (Cameroun)
Special Mention	Africa Shafted
Best Documentary	The Virgin, the Copts and Me by Namir Abdel Messeeh
Jury Special Prize	Virgin Margarida by Licinio Azevedo

=== 2014 Africa International Film Festival ===
The 2014 Africa International Film Festival was held from 9 November 2014 to 16 November 2014 at Tinapa, Cross River.

==== Award winners ====
Award	Winner
Best Feature Film	October 1 (Kunle Afolayan) – Nigeria
Best Nigerian Film	Ojuju (C.J. Obasi) – Nigeria
Best Director	Andrew Dosunmu (Mother of George) – Nigeria
Best Screenplay	October 1 (Tunde Babalola) – Nigeria
Best Actor	Sadiq Daba (October 1) – Nigeria
Best Actress	Thishiwe Ziqubu (Hard to – South Africa
Best Short Film	Stiff (Samantha Nell)
Best Documentary	The Supreme Price (Joana Lipper)
Best Student Short	Aissa's Story (Iquo Essien)
Audience Choice	Gone Too Far! (Destiny Ekaragha)
Outstanding Jury Award	Om Amira (Naji Ismail)

=== 2015 Africa International Film Festival ===
==== Awards winners ====
Award	Winner
Outstanding Jury Award	Hex by Clarence Peters
Best Student Short Film	Joy by Solomon Onita
Best Animation	Legacy of Rubies by Ebele Okoye
Best Short Film on the Continent	Alma by Christa Eka Amaka
Audience Choice Awards	Silent Tears by Ishaya Bako
Best Actor	Charlie Vundla
Best Actress	Fulu Mugovhani (Ayanda)
Best Screenplay	The Price of Love
Best Documentary	Eighteam
Oronto Douglas Award for Best Nigerian Film	Reflections (Desmond Elliot)
Best Director	Raja Amari
Best Feature Film	Fevers by Hicham Ayouch

=== 2016 Africa International Film Festival ===
The 2016 AFRIFF Globe Awards held on Saturday, 19 November 2016, at Eko Hotel and Suites, Victoria Island, Lagos, Nigeria.

==== Awards winners ====
Award	Winner:
Special Jury Prize	Vaya by Akin Omotoso
Best Short Film	Lodgers by Keni Ogunlola
Audience Choice Award	Slow Country
Best Actor	Ramsey Nouah ('76)
Best Actress	Bimbo Akintola (93 Days)
Best Screenplay	'76 by Emmanuel Okomanyi
Best Documentary	Nowhere to Run by Dan McCain
Oronto Douglas Award for Best Nigerian Film	Green White Green by Abba Makama
Best Director	Izu Ojukwu ('76)
Best Feature Film	'76 by Izu Ojukwu
Special Jury Mentions	Somkele Idhalama (93 Days); Ifeanyi Dike (Green White Green)

=== 2017 Africa International Film Festival ===
AFRIFF 2017 featured the following; Panel sessions, screenings, school children segment and various trainings.

==== Awards winners ====
Award	Winner
Best Actor	Ibrahim Koma, Wùlu (Mali)
Best Actress	Lydia Forson, Keteke (Ghana)
Special Jury Mention	Alter Ego by Moses Inwang (Nigeria)
Oronto Douglas Award for Best Nigerian Film	Hakkunde by Oluseyi Amuwa (Nigeria)
Best Screenplay:	Dauda Coulibali, Wulu (Mali)
Best Director	Alain Gomis, Felicité (Senegal)
Audience Choice Award	The Lost Café by Kenneth Gyang (Nigeria)
Best Student Short Film	The Fall (South Africa)
Best Short Film	1745 by Gordon Napier (UK)
Best Animation	Huse Met Lang Ore (South Africa)
Best Documentary	We Have Never Been Kids by Mahmood Soliman (Egypt)
Best Feature Film	I Am Not a Witch by Rungano Nyoni (Zambia/UK)
Best French Language Film	Wulu (Mali)

=== 2018 Africa International Film Festival ===
The 8th annual AFRIFF was held from 11 to 17 November 2018 at Twin Waters Entertainment Center in Lagos, Nigeria.

==== Awards winners ====
Award	Winner
Best Feature Film	Azali by Kwabena Gyansah (Ghana)
Special Jury for Outstanding Film	Not in My Neighbourhood (South Africa)
Best Director	Jahmil X.T. Qubeka, Sew the Winter to My Skin (South Africa)
Best Screenplay	Azali (Ghana)
Best Short	Coat of Harms (Nigeria)
Best Animation	A Kalabanda Ate My Homework (Uganda)
Best Student Short	Imfura (Rwanda)
Documentary - Special Mention	Cantadoras. Musical Memories of Life and death in Colombia (COLOMBIA)
Best Documentary	Ramothopo the Centenarian (South Africa)
Best Male Performance	Ezra Mabengeza, Sew the Winter to My Skin (South Africa)
Best Female Performance	Asana Alhassan, Azali (Ghana)
Viewers Choice Award	Kasala! (Nigeria)

=== 2019 Africa International Film Festival ===
The 9th annual AFRIFF was held from November 10 to 16, 2019 at Filmhouse Cinemas in Landmark, Retail Village, Lagos, Nigeria. It was organized in partnership with the US Consulate, Access Bank and Lagos State. The 2019 AFRIFF was focused on the ''SHEROES" that is the Female Film Makers.

==== Awards winners ====
Award	Winner
Best Feature Film	Rattlesnakes, Julius Amedume (USA)
Best Director	Akin Omotoso, The Ghost & The House of Truth (Nigeria)
Best Screenplay	Ramata Sy, Our Lady of The Nile (Rwanda)
Best Male Performance	Bongile Mantsai, Knuckle City (South Africa)
Best Female Performance	Kate Henshaw, The Ghost & House of Truth (Nigeria)
Best Short	My Tyson (Italy)
Best Documentary	In Search (Kenya)
Best Animation	Malika - Warrior Queen (Nigeria)
Best Student Short	Linger (USA)
Short - Special Mention	Appreciation (UK)
Fiction - Special Mention	Gold Coast Lounge (Ghana)
Special Jury for outstanding film	Sankara is Not Dead (Burkina Faso)
Oronto Douglas Award for Best Nigerian Film	The Ghost & The House of Truth (Nigeria)
Peter Obi Legacy Award for Female Excellence	Lizzy Ovoeme (Nigeria)
Viewers Choice Award	Rattlesnakes, Julius Amedume (USA)

=== 2021 Africa International Film Festival ===
The 10th annual AFRIFF was held from 7 to 13 November 2021 at Terra Kulture, Victoria Island, Lagos, Nigeria. It was the first edition after a one-year hiatus caused by the COVID-19 pandemic.

==== Awards winners ====
Award	Winner
Best Feature Film	Trees for Peace, dir. Alanna Brown (USA, Rwanda)
Best Director	Michael Omonua, CJ Obasi, Abba T. Makama, Juju Stories (Nigeria)
Best Screenplay	Alanna Brown, Trees for Peace (USA, Rwanda)
Best Male Performance	Kelechi Udegbe, Collision Course (Nigeria)
Best Female Performance	Ijeoma Grace Agu, 10 Songs for Charity (Nigeria)
Special Jury for outstanding film	Tainted Canvas, dir. Segilola Ogidan (Nigeria)
Best Short	Al-Sit, dir. Suzannah Mirghani (Sudan)
Best Documentary	In God's Hands, dir. Mohamed Rida Gueznai (Morocco)
Best Animation	Lady Buckit and the Motley Mopsters, dir. Adebisi Adetayo (Nigeria)
Best Student Short	Bride Untangled, dir. Julie Ako (Nigeria)
Oronto Douglas Award for Best Nigerian Film	The Griot, dir. Adeoluwa Owu
Viewers Choice Award	The Hail Mary, dir. Nnamdi Kanaga (USA)
