= Kunle Afolayan =

Nigerian actor, director and producer (born 1975)

- Afolayan at the 2014 Africa Magic Viewers Choice Awards
- Born: 30 September 1975 (age 51); Ebute Metta, Lagos, Lagos State, Nigeria
- Education: New York Film Academy
- Occupations: Actor; Director; Producer
- Years active: 1999-Present
- Known for: Saworoide, Agogo Ewo, Phone Swap, 1 October
- Spouse: Tolu Afolayan (m. 2007; div. 2019)
- Children: 4
- Parent: Adeyemi Josiah Afolayan (Ade Love - father)
- Relatives: Moji Afolayan (sister); Gabriel Afolayan (brother); Aremu Afolayan (brother); Anu Afolayan (brother)

Kunle Afolayan (born 30 September 1975) is a Nigerian actor, producer, and film director. He is credited for elevating the quality of Nollywood movies through larger budgets, shooting on 35mm, releasing in cinemas, and improving cliché Nollywood storylines. His directing credits include the Aníkúlápó franchise, The Figurine, Phone Swap, October 1, and Citation. Afolayan is the CEO of Golden Effects Pictures, a Nigerian film and production company incorporated in 2005.

== Early life and education ==
Afolayan is of Igbomina-Yoruba descent and is from Kwara State. His father, Adeyemi Afolayan, was a theatre and film director and his mother, Adeola, also worked in the theater. He has four siblings, Gabriel Afolayan, Aremu Afolayan, Moji Afolayan—all actors—and Anu Afoloyan, a film composer.

Afoloyan attended Nigerian Model Primary School in Lagos, and then went on to Federal Government College, also in Lagos, for his secondary education. He received a bachelor's degree in economics at the University of Lagos. In 2005, he acquired a diploma in digital filmmaking from the New York Film Academy.

== Career ==
=== Early work and breakthrough (1998–2010) ===
Afolayan started his film career as an actor in Tunde Kelani's political drama Saworoide, released in 1999. Kelani encouraged Afolayan, who was more interested in being a director, to first become an actor before moving behind the camera. Between 1998 and 2004, Afolayan appeared in several Nollywood films while also working at a bank in corporate affairs. After quitting his banking career to pursue a full-time career in film, Afolayan attended the New York Film Academy where he received a diploma in digital filmmaking in 2005.

In 2006, Afolayan made his directorial debut with Irapada, a supernatural thriller which won the Africa Movie Academy Award for Best Film in an African Language. It is considered to be among the first Nollywood films in the mid-2000's to represent the New Nigerian Cinema, a move away from low-budget, straight-to-video films toward higher production value films with complex storylines that were intended to be seen in cinemas. Afoloayan said of Irapada, of which sixty percent was in English, that it was misunderstood as it concerns the film's Yoruba designation. "It's not about if it is an English, Yoruba or Igbo movie. Irapada is a purely Nigerian movie because it has all the Nigerian Major languages. We wanted to do something that will not only be peculiar to one's one's race but to the entire nation, something that will attract an average movie lover."

His second film,The Figurine (2010), was a critical and commercial success, turning Afolayan into one of Nigeria's best-known filmmakers. It received ten nominations and won five awards at the 6th Africa Movie Academy Awards, including Best Picture, Achievement in Visual Effect, Heart of African Award for Best Film from Nigeria, Achievement in Cinematography, and Best Performance by an Actor in a Leading Role. Subject of a scholarly book, Auteuring Nollywood: Critical Perspectives on The Figurine, The Figurine solidified Afolayan's position as one of the leading Nigerian directors pushing for a new kind of filmmaking that could compete on the international stage.

=== Career progression and Netflix partnership (2011–present) ===
Afolayan's next film, Phone Swap (2012), was conceived in response to an advertising brief on behalf of a corporate sponsor for a film that would appeal to the 15-45 age demographic. Afolayan intentionally sought to direct a comedy to diversify his production company. "Phone Swap is something different from what I’ve done in the past. It’s light, it’s bright, it’s a different genre from Irapada or from The Figurine." It received 4 nominations at the 8th Africa Movie Academy Awards, including the category Best Nigerian Film and won the award Achievement in Production Design.

In 2014, Afolayan had another commercial and critical success with October 1, a thriller taking place in 1960 colonial Nigeria. It was the winner of 16 African movie awards—including Best Feature Film, Best Screenplay, and Best Actor at the 2014 Africa International Film Festival—and was the second highest grossing Nigerian film at the time of its release, a feat Afolayan was to repeat two years later with The CEO. As of April 2025, both films ranked #66 on the List of highest-grossing Nigerian films. In 2015, Netflix acquired the online distribution rights to October 1, making it one of the first Nollywood films to be featured on the streamer.

Afolayan next helmed The Bridge (2017), a romantic drama starring Nigerian singer Chidinma in her first acting role. The film, in which Chidinma's Igbo character falls in love with a Yoruba prince, was in part a social commentary about the pressures young Nigerian couples face involving class and tribe in their marriage choices. That same year, the director released the comedy Omugwo. The plots centers on a couple played by Ken Erics and Omowumi Dada whose mothers (Ayo Adesanya and Patience Ozokwor) move in with them to perform Omugwo, an Igbo tradition of postpartum care provided a mother and her newborn.

In 2021 Afolayan released Citation, a Netflix drama inspired by the issue of sexual assault on Nigerian college campuses and starring Jimmy Jean-Louis as the accused professor and Temi Otedola as his victim. Film critic Tambay Obenson observed that while the film depicts an issue that is not unusual in film, it does so through a West African lens rarely seen by international audiences. Citation was the fourth Afolayan film that Netflix had acquired online distribution rights to following The CEO, October 1, and The Figurine. Later that year, the streamer announced it was expanding the scope of its partnership with Afolayan by commissioning three original movies : a historical drama, a folklore fantasy, and a character drama.

Swallow, the screen adaption of Sefi Atta's book by the same name was the first Netflix release in October 2021. Taking place in Lagos in the 1980s, the gritty drama follows a young woman played by Ijeoma Grace Agu who weighs whether to become a drug mule. Netflix next released Aníkúlápó, an epic Nigerian fantasy, in September 2022. Afolayan described the film as a "Game of Thrones recreated in Nigeria but with a better representation of our culture”. Eleven days after its release, it was the #1 most-watched non-English Netflix original film. In 2023 it was also the most nominated film at the Africa Magic Viewers' Choice Awards, with 16 nods. The film's sequel, Anikulapo: Rise of the Spectre, was released as a six-episode series on 1 March 2024. It ranked as a top-10 Netflix release for 10 weeks in Nigeria, amassing over 13M viewed hours. In October 2024, the director announced that Netflix had renewed the series for a second season.

Ijogbon, the third of Afolayan's Netflix three-picture deal, was released in October 2023. Scripted by Tunde Babalola of October 1 and Citation, the film is a coming-of-age drama centered on four friends in rural South West Nigeria who stumble across a bag of uncut diamonds. Within its first two weeks, the film claimed a Global Top 10 spot and ranked in the Top 10 in sixteen countries.

In November 2024, Afolayan's psychological thriller Recall premiered at the Africa International Film Festival (AFRIFF). In the same vein as other of the director''s works such as The Figurine, Irapada, and Aníkúlápó, the film's narrative is situated within the context of African spirituality. Anita (Sharon Ooja) and Goke (Olarotimi Fakunle) have been married for 10 years and have two children. A day after their anniversary, their world is upended when Anita loses her memory, and a series of long-hidden secrets creates a deep divide between them. The film, his first cinematic release since 2019, was released in April 2025 and grossed ₦9,181,000.

While a beneficiary of a Netflix partnership over the years, Afolayan has also been a proponent of the Nigerian film industry doing more to diversify and strengthen its own distribution platforms. In early 2025, he released several films whose licensing agreements with Netflix had expired—The Figurine, Phone Swap, and The CEO—for free viewing on his YouTube's KAPStream channel. In a Channels TV interview, he explained that due to the very limited African cinema distribution at the time of their release, this was an opportunity to bring the films to a wider audience. He added that filmmakers should balance their commercial imperatives with ensuring their works remain relevant and available for future generations.

In February 2026 Netflix released Aníkúlápó: The Ghoul Awakens, a 5-episode series and the third installment of the Aníkúlápó franchise. At the time of this release he was reported to be working on two projects: a 10-part series about the Yoruba tribe and its deities and a docudrama about his father, the late filmmaker and actor Adeyemi Afolayan.

== Personal life ==
Afolayan married Tolu Afolayan in 2007, and divorced in 2019. They have four children. He identifies as a Freethinker.

== Controversy ==
On 6 April 2015, Afolayan posted a tweet which implied that Igbos were the majority group behind copyright infringement in Nigeria. The backlash from fans led to an apology from Afolayan and an explanation that he was concerned about the piracy of his films, especially of unlicensed copies of October 1, his latest film at the time at the time. Shortly after the controversy, on 13 April 2015 pirated copies of October 1 hit the market.

In an interview with Cable magazine, Afolayan was quoted as saying he does not watch a lot of Nigerian movies; ″Truth be told, I hardly watch them because I am keen on watching movies that will challenge me and change my orientation about certain things.″ and this led to him receiving several heated responses from fans and some colleagues in the Nigerian film industry. A few days after, Afolayan explained that his quote had been taken out of context.

== Filmography ==
Year	Film	Role				Notes	Ref
Year	Film	Actor	Director	Producer	Writer	Notes	Ref
1999	Saworoide	Yes					
2002	Agogo Eewo	Yes					
2005	Ti Ala Ba Ku	Yes					
2006	Irapada	Yes	Yes	Yes	Yes		
2006	Èjiwòrò	Yes					
2007	Onitemi	Yes					
2009	The Figurine	Yes	Yes				
2009	Farayola	Yes					
2012	Phone Swap	Yes	Yes	Yes			
2014	Dazzling Mirage	Yes					
2014	1 October	Yes	Yes	Yes			
2016	The CEO		Yes	Yes			
2017	The Bridge	Yes	Yes				
2017	Omugwo		Yes	Yes			
2018	Crazy People	Yes					
2019	Mokalik		Yes	Yes			
2019	Diamonds in the Sky		Yes				
2020	Citation		Yes				
2021	Ayinla	Yes					
2021	Swallow	Yes	Yes	Yes	Yes		
2021	A Naija Christmas		Yes				
2022	Anikulapo	Yes	Yes	Yes			
2023	Ijogbon			yes			
2024	Recall		Yes	Yes			

== Awards and nominations ==
Year	Award	Category	Film	Result	Ref
2019	Best of Nollywood Awards	Director of the Year	Diamond in the Sky	Nominated	
2021	Net Honours	Most Searched Actor		Nominated	
2023	Africa Magic Viewers' Choice Awards	Best Indigenous Language – Yoruba	Anikulapo	Won	
2023	Africa Magic Viewers' Choice Awards	Best Movie West Africa	Anikulapo	Nominated	
2023	Africa Magic Viewers' Choice Awards	Best Overall Movie	Anikulapo	Won	
2023	Africa Magic Viewers' Choice Awards	Best Director	Anikulapo	Nominated	

== See also ==
- List of Yoruba people
- List of Nigerian film producers
