= Omugwo (film) =

2017 Nigerian film

- Movie poster
- Directed by: Kunle Afolayan
- Written by: Kemi Adesoye
- Produced by: Kunle Afolayan
- Starring: Ken Erics; Ayo Adesanya; Patience Ozokwor; Omowumi Dada; Christian Paul; Bosede Akinremi; Henry Alade; Adefila Titilayomi; Adekanya Funmilayo; Omolesho Kehinde
- Cinematography: Ifeanyi Iloduba (Boka)
- Release date: 2017
- Country: Nigeria
- Language: English

Omugwo is a 2017 Nigerian comedy film written by Kemi Adesoye and directed by Kunle Afolayan under the production studio of Golden Effects Pictures in partnership with African Magic Films. Kunle Afolayan, who is known for his whodunit movies, diverted to provide the audience with comic relief. The comedic movie is one of the three movies commissioned by African Magic Films to be produced in collaboration with him. The film, though comical, addresses a vital issue in African settings—motherhood. It prioritizes African traditional rites in motherhood, and it stars actors and actresses such as Ayo Adesanya, Patience Ozokwor, Omowunmi Dada and Ken Erics.

== Synopsis ==
The film follows the story of a young couple, a civil engineer and an online radio personality. After the delivery of their child, the duo's mother moved in to take care of the newly delivered mother in accordance with the Igbo practice Ọmụgwọ. The film takes a comic and dramatic turn when the household has to battle with the different cultural backgrounds of the two mothers and the postpartum depression of the wife.

== Premiere ==
The movie was privately screened at Silverbird Galleria, Victoria Island, Lagos prior to its release in cinemas across the country. The screening was attended by celebrities and notable personalities in the movie industry, such as Africa Magic, Silverbird Distribution companies' stakeholders, Founder/CEO of the Africa International Film Festival (AFRIFF), Ms. Chioma Ude, Mahmood Ali-Balogun, Chris Ekejimbe, Kate Henshaw, Mr. Seun Shoyinka, Yomi Fash-Lanso and Funsho Adeolu.

== Cast ==
- Ken Erics as Raymond
- Omowunmi Dada as Omotunde
- Patience Ozokwor as Chimamanda
- Ayo Adesanya as Candace
- Christian Paul as Steven
- Bosede Akinremi as Female Colleague
- Henry Alade as Gateman
- Adefila Titilayomi as Midwife 1
- Adekanya Funmilayo as Midwife 2
- Omolesho Kehinde as Staff
- Akintunde Morayo as Baby Ada-Regina
- Ugochi Ndukwe as Supermarket Manager
- Gloria Odukoya as Newborn Baby
- Nicolas Okafor as Taxi Driver
- Omowunmi Okungbure as Nurse

== See also ==
IMDb
