= Kent Edunjobi =

Nigerian music producer

Hassan Kehinde Daniel, popularly known as Kent Edunjobi, is a Nigerian songwriter and music producer.

== Early life and career ==
Edunjobi studied computer science and statistics at the University of Nigeria, Nsukka.

He started his music career as a member of the Apex Choir of the Celestial Church of Christ, where he is now the music director. He started working for Kunle Afolayan Productions in 2016 and has been composing soundtracks for the production company since.

In 2023, he came into the limelight after composing the soundtrack for Aníkúlápó. In the same year, he released Ebenezer with the Apex Choir. It had 1 million views on YouTube within its first month.

== Discography ==
Soundtracks
Year	Movie
2023	Aníkúlápó
2021	A Naija Christmas
2021	King of Boys: The Return of the King
2020	Citation
2018	Diamonds in the Sky
2017	The Bridge
2017	Swallow
2017	Roti

Singles
Year	Song	Ref
2023	"Ebenezer"	

== Awards ==
- Best Soundtrack at Africa Movie Academy Awards for Citation
- Best Soundtrack at 2023 Africa Magic Viewers' Choice Awards for Aníkúlápó
