= Ogogo (disambiguation) =

Ogogo or OGOGO may refer to:

== People ==
- Abu Ogogo (born 1989), English footballer
- Anthony Ogogo (born 1988), English boxer and professional wrestler
- Taiwo Hassan (born 1959), known as Ogogo, Nigerian actor

== Other ==
- OGOGO (album), 2017 album by Mike Gordon
