= Ji mmiri ọkụ =

Soup from southeastern Nigeria

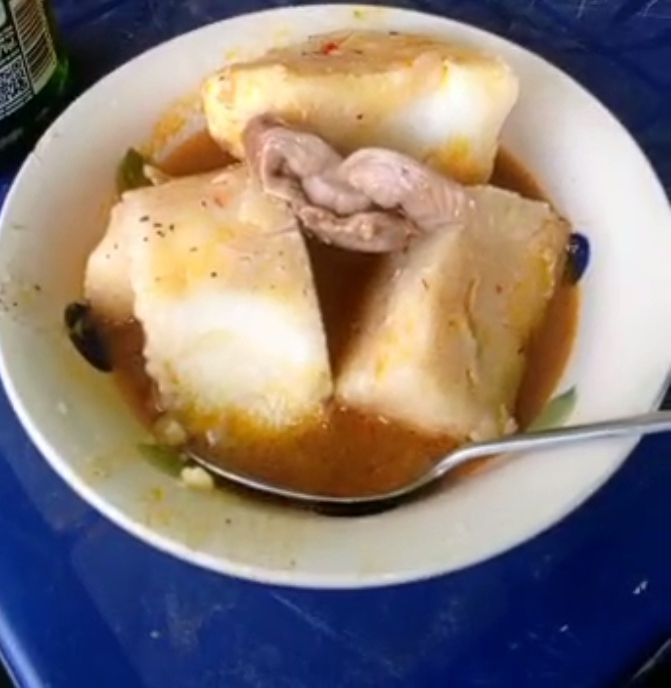
- Ji mmiri ọkụ
- Type: Traditional Nigerian food
- Place of origin: South East
- Region or state: Igbo
- Main ingredients: Yam; Fish; Cameroon Pepper; Negro Pepper
- Ingredients generally used: Crayfish

Ji mmiri ọkụ, known as yam pepper soup, is prepared for nursing mothers. The soup is popular among the Igbo people of southeastern Nigeria. It is considered part of a cultural ritual and is also commonly consumed when one is under the weather, as it may help relieve cold and flu symptoms.

== Cultural significance ==
Ji mmiri ọkụ is prepared for nursing mothers because it is believed to help cleanse the uterus and support contraction after childbirth. It also provides energy for nursing mothers. Ingredients used in its preparation, such as uziza (West African pepper), ehuru (calabash nutmeg), and uda (African Negro pepper), are regarded as medicinal plants.

It is mostly prepared by the woman's mother after she arrives for Ọmụgwọ and it is regarded as a cultural ritual among the Igbo people. The yam is cooked until it becomes very soft for easy consumption.

== Ingredients ==
List:

- Dry pepper
- Red onion (chopped/ blended)
- Smoked panla fish
- Dried local Catfish
- Cray fish
- Palm Oil
- Seasoning Cubes
- Salt
- Scent leaves
- Uziza leaves
- Uda “Negro pepper”
