= Sheriffdeen Tella =

Sheriffdeen Adewale Tella is a Nigerian academic economist and professor of economics at the Olabisi Onabanjo University, and is also a frequent economic commentator in the Nigerian daily newspapers. He is an Emeritus Professor of Economics at the Olabisi Onabanjo University.

He worked as Vice-Chancellor at Crescent University until his controversial letter to Ogun State House of Assembly preventing State government from borrowing and eventual resignation in December 2010. He also lectured Economics at Babcock University, Ilishan-Remo, Ogun State and Pan Atlantic University, Lekki-Epe, Lagos State. Tella specialises in Monetary Economics, Development Economics and Banking & Finance, especially the nexus between the banking system and the Nigerian economy. He is a Fellow of the Chatered Institute of Bankers of Nigeria and a Fellow of the Nigerian Economic Society.

== Education ==
Tella obtained a Bachelor's in Economics from the University of Benin, and M.Sc. and Ph.D. from the University of Ibadan. He proceeded to the United States, where he was a Fulbright Scholar at the University of Nebraska–Lincoln.

== Academic career ==
Tella has lectured at OOU in economics since the early 1980s when the University was established and became a professor in 2005.

Tella has in the past co-authored reports for the Overseas Development Institute mainly on financial access within African countries, especially Nigeria. He chaired the Centre for Continuing Education among other administrative positions while at OOU.

He took a leave from OOU to work as the Vice-Chancellor of Crescent University, a private university with ties to Nigeria's ex-Foreign Minister, Prince Bola Ajibola, from July 2009 to December 2010. It was alleged that his criticism of the economic policies of then Ogun State governor, Otunba Gbenga Daniel, contributed to his ouster from Crescent.

== Selected publications ==
=== Journal articles ===
- Adewale S. Tella; G. Okosun (1993). "Banking deregulation: the interest rate phenomenon in the Nigerian context". African Review of Money Finance and Banking. 1 (1): 47–56. JSTOR 23024776.
- Sheriffdeen A. Tella (2002). "Monetary Union in Practice: Lessons from European Monetary Union" (PDF). Central Bank of Nigeria Economic and Financial Review. 41 (4): 24–40. Archived from the original (PDF) on 2017-12-17.
