= Ijogbon =

- Directed by: Kunle Afolayan
- Written by: Tunde Babalola
- Produced by: Kunle Afolayan
- Starring: Gabriel Afolayan; Adunni Ade; Femi Branch; Dorathy Bachor
- Distributed by: Netflix
- Release date: 13 October 2023
- Country: Nigeria

Ijogbon is a Nigerian 2023 coming-of-age adventure film produced by Kunle Afolayan and distributed by Netflix. It is one of the three movies agreement signed by Kunle Afolayan with Netflix. The film was written by Tunde Babalola and was released to Netflix on 13 October 2023. The movie stars Gabriel Afolayan, Adunni Ade, Ex BBNaija star, Dorathy Bachor, Sam Dede, Femi Branch, Yemi Sodimu, Bimbo Manuel, Yemi Solade and a host of others. The film was shot in Oyo State, in the KAP Film Village and Resort.

== Synopsis ==
Ijogbon, the coming-of-age adventure film tells the story of four teenagers from a remote village in the south-west area of Nigeria. These four teenagers saw a pouch of diamonds in the strangest of ways and they chose to keep these diamonds, their decision to keep and conceal these diamonds despite the owners coming out to look for their diamonds led to some perilous events ahead of them, putting one of them in serious trouble.

== Cast ==
Selected cast of the movie are:

- Bimbo Manuel as Kabiesi
- Gabriel Afolayan as Brother Kasali
- Sam Dede as Rev. Sangodoyin
- Tana Adelana as Mama Oby
- Yemi Solade as Chief Owonifaari
- Yemi Sodimu as Principal
- Femi Branch as Banjo
- Adunni Ade as Chidera
- Funky Mallam as Kafachan
- Dorathy Bachor as Bisi
- Ruby Akubueze as Oby
- Ojuolape Kayode as Jamiu
- Oluwaseyi Ebiesuwa as Ranti
