= Dana King (singer) =

Nigerian songwriter (born 1992)

- Born: Akinola Daniel Ojelabi; 3 November 1992 (age 33); Ogun State, Nigeria
- Genres: R&B, Alternative pop
- Occupations: Singer; Songwriter
- Instrument: Guitar
- Years active: 2010–present

Akinola Daniel Ojelabi (born November 3, 1992), professionally known as Dana King, is a Nigerian-born singer, songwriter, and producer. He first gained widespread attention in 2015 following the release of his breakout single “Omoye”, as well as his cover of Hero, originally recorded by Enrique Iglesias. He emerged as Songwriter of the Year at the Eko Heritage Award in 2025.

== Background and education ==
Dana was born and raised in Ogun State. He attended African Church Grammar School, Abeokuta, Before pursuing higher education at Crescent University, where he graduated in August 2019. He later continued his academic journey at Glasgow Caledonian University, graduating in May 2024. He is now based in Scotland.

== Career ==
Dana King began his musical journey in 2010 and has so far built a brand around his emotive vocal delivery and a musical style that blends alternative pop, soft rock, folk, house, R&B, soul, and African influences. In November 2025, he launched his own record label, Magnat Records, aimed at supporting creative independence and nurturing new talent.

In March 2026, Dana King performed at Motif in Aberdeen.

In May 2026, he announced the launch of his new EP titled “Maestro of Ballads.” Speaking at an interview with New Telegraph He said the EP is about expressing emotion through different sounds and cultures.

Renowned critic Emmanuel Daraloye described Dana’s single “Faraway,” released in 2024, as a tender anthem of Love, loyalty, and commitment.
