= Olaiya Igwe =

Nigerian film maker

Ebun Oloyede
- Ẹbùn Oloyede
- Other names: Olaiya Igwe
- Education: Crescent University
- Occupations: Actor film producer
- Years active: 1970–present

Ebun Oloyede// popularly known as Olaiya Igwe is a veteran Nollywood actor, producer and director who is known for the production of Iru Esin, Alase Aye, Ololade Mr Money, and Abela Pupa.

== Biography ==
Olaiya is a native of Ogun State and in 2022, He graduated from Crescent University, Abeokuta, Nigeria.

== Career ==
Olaiya Igwe has spent more than forty years in the movie industry, he has featured in over one hundred movies and produced over twenty movies.

== Filmography ==
- Blacksmith: Alagbede (2024)
- Ijakumo: The Born Again Stripper (2022) as Man
- Jagbajantis Reloaded (2022) as Baba Legacy
- U-Turn (2022) as Mr. Kamoru
- Obankoba (2021) as Oba Akilekun
- Saheed Esu (2020) as Baba Anyila
- Mokalik (2019) as daddy Jide
- Diamonds in the Sky (2019) as Salamander
- Ayitale (2013) as Oloye Demola
- Jelili (2011) as Alade
- Iru Esin
- Kosi Tabi Sugbon
- Abela Pupa
- Baale Oko Ilu
- Awon Aladun De (TV series)
- Ile Alayo
- Ololade Mr Money
