= A Kalabanda Ate My Homework =

Ugandan animation film

- Directed by: Raymond Malinga
- Screenplay by: Robin Malinga
- Produced by: Raymond Malinga; Robin Malinga
- Starring: Martha Kay; Faith Kisa; Patrick Salvador Idringi; Omara Daniel; Patience Logose
- Edited by: Tim Hook
- Music by: Isaiah Mucunguzi
- Animation by: Allan Muyinga; Jemimah Atim; L Nakishero Francis
- Layouts by: Paul Wembabazi
- Production company: The Creatures Company
- Distributed by: The Creatures Company
- Release date: December 16, 2017
- Running time: 7 minutes
- Country: Uganda
- Language: English
- Budget: UGx 5M (estimate)

A Kalabanda Ate My Homework is a Ugandan animation short film created by Robin Malinga and directed by his blood brother Raymond Malinga. The film stars Martha Kay, Faith Kisa with Patrick Salvador Idringi and Daniel Omara. It tells a story of Tendo, a primary school pupil who came to school without his homework and when asked why he didn't hand in his homework, he gives an excuse that a Kalabanda (a mythical creature) ate his homework.

The animated short received positive praises from Ugandan natives who praised its originality. The movie is loosely based on a "kalabanda",a mythical creature known to Ugandans especially school going students that haunts within school premise. The movie adds on Ugandan's pride of the famous YouTube "katoto"cartoon series that center around a pot bellied local mukiga man and his adventures through both town and Village. The short inspired the opening of new animation studios such as Muzaaya animation studios (U)

== Cast ==
- Patrick Salvador Idringi as the Kalabanda
- Martha Kay as Tendo
- Faith Kisa as Amiya
- Daniel Omara as Mr. Oketch
- Kasaija Peter
- Seguja Derrick

== Reception ==
The film received positive reception and has since its release been selected in a number of festivals, nominated for awards and won some. It was selected and screened at the Reanimania Art Festival in Yerevan in Armenia, Cote d’ivore film festival where it won an award for best animation, African Film Festival, Silicon Valley African Film Festival and also received a nomination at the 2017 Uganda Film Festival Awards.

In 2018, Kalabanda won the "Best Creatures Animation" award at Africa International Film Festival in Lagos, Nigeria.
