= Deola Sagoe =

Nigerian fashion designer

- Born: Deola Ade-Ojo; 21 August 1966 (age 60); Ondo, Nigeria
- Education: University of Miami; University of Lagos
- Occupation: fashion designer
- Years active: 1989 - present
- Spouse: Kofi Sagoe (m. 2009, divorced)
- Children: 3
- Website: deolasagoe.co

Deola Sagoe is an haute couture fashion designer from Ondo State, Nigeria. She won both the Best Costume Designer at the 2015 Africa Magic Viewers Choice Awards and Achievement in Costume Design at the 11th Africa Movie Academy Awards as the costume designer for the film October 1.

== Early life and education ==
Adeola Sagoe (née Ade-Ojo) was born in August 1966 as the first child of Chief Micheal Ade-Ojo, founder of Elizade University and his first wife, Mrs. Elizabeth Wuraola Ade-Ojo. She is Yoruba. Her parents are originally from the town of Ilara-Mokin, Ondo State. She studied at the University of Miami and University of Lagos with a Masters in Finance and Management.

== Career ==
Sagoe began designing in 1989 and has gained international notoriety for her lively, and colorful designs. She was recently appointed to represent Nigeria in a new international campaign organized by the United Nations World Food Program. The campaign, titled “Catwalk the World: Fashion for Food.”, began in Nigeria in April 2006 and recently staged an event in Ghana which brought celebrities like Damon Dash, his wife, designer Rachel Roy, and Ghanaian-born, London-based designer Ozwald Boateng. The campaign's goal is to raise money towards halving the number of hungry people in the world, particularly children, by 2015. Sagoe frequently exhibits her couture collection at Cape Town Fashion Week and has been an invited guest of New York Fashion Week in the past. Sagoe unveiled her Komole collection in 2018, it is a selection of Yoruba bridal and occasion wear which draws upon the mood and myths evoked through the ages by royalty. Sagoe has won the “Africa Designs” and the MNET/ Anglo Gold African designs 2000 awards for which she was nominated by Andre Leon Tally, US Vogue editor.

== Other work ==
Deola had a cameo appearance in the 2014 film October 1 where she portrayed Funmilayo Ransome-Kuti.

== Personal life ==
Deola Sagoe was married to Kofi Sagoe though the couple separated due to irreconcilable differences. She has three daughters: Teni, Aba, and Tiwa.
