= Ile Alayo =

Nigerian comedy drama series

- Ilẹ́ Aláyọ́
- Genre: Drama; Comedy
- Written by: Femi Adebayo
- Directed by: Femi Adebayo
- Country of origin: Nigeria
- Original languages: Yoruba; Pidgin English; English

Production
- Executive producer: StarTimes
- Producer: Viki Liu
- Production locations: Lagos, Lagos State, Nigeria
- Production company: StarTimes

Original release
- Network: Wakaati TV
- Release: 6 December 2021 – present

Ile Alayo is a 2021 yoruba language comedy drama series directed by Femi Adebayo airing on Wakaati TV and ST Nollywood Plus. It is produced by StarTimes.

== Cast ==
- Mr Macaroni
- Broda Shaggi
- Odunlade Adekola
- Mercy Aigbe
- Adebayo Salami
- Lateef Adedimeji
- Dele Odule
- Woli Agba
- Femi Adebayo
- Ebun Oloyede
- Cute Abiola
- Wale Akorede
