= Pat Nebo =

Nigerian production designer (died 2023)

- Born: Patrick Nebo; 9 March 1957; Nigeria
- Died: 14 September 2023
- Occupations: production designer, art director
- Years active: 1993–2023

Pat Nebo (died 14 September 2023) was a Nigerian production designer as well as an art director. He worked as the production designer in films including October 1, "76, Being Mrs Elliot and Okafor's Law. He also worked as a set designer in few films.

In 1993, he started his career as a production designer with the home movie Ti Oluwa Ni Ile. In the same year, he worked in the two sequels of Ti oluwa ni ile. In 2009, he made maiden cinema appearance with the film The Figurine where he acted as the 'Marriage Registrar'. However, he continued to work as the production designer in several films such as Araromire, Arugba, Alero's Symphony and Being Mrs Elliot.

Apart from production designing, he also worked as the art director in the films: The Figurine, Phone Swap, Half of a Yellow Sun and 76.

Pat Nebo died on 14 September 2023.

== Filmography ==
Year	Film	Role	Genre	Ref.
1993	Ti oluwa ni ile	production designer	Home movie	
1993	Ti oluwa ni ile 2	production designer	Home movie	
1993	Ti oluwa ni ile 3	production designer	Home movie	
2002	Agogo èèwò	production designer	Film	
2009	The Figurine	actor:Marriage Registrar, production designer, art director	Film	
2009	Araromire	production designer	Film	
2009	Arugba	production designer	Film	
2011	Alero's Symphony	set designer	Film	
2012	Phone Swap	production designer, art director	Film	
2014	Being Mrs Elliot	production designer	Film	
2014	Half of a Yellow Sun	art director	Film	
2014	October 1	production designer	Film	
2016	Okafor's Law	set designer	Film	
2016	The CEO	production designer	Film	
2016	76	actor:Colonel Aliu, production designer	Film	
2017	Omugwo	production designer	Film	
2017	The Tribunal	production designer	Film	
2018	Lionheart	production designer	Film	
2019	Mokalik (Mechanic)	production designer, art director	Film	
2019	Citation	production designer	Film	
2019	Crossroads	production designer	Film	
TBD	The Milkmaid	production designer	Film	
