= The Bridge (2017 film) =

2017 Nigerian romantic drama film

- Directed by: Kunle Afolayan
- Written by: Shola Dada
- Screenplay by: Shola Dada
- Produced by: Lasun Ray Eyiwumi
- Starring: Chidinma Ekile; Demoal Adedoyin; Tina Mba; Ayo Mogaji; Zack Orji; Bayo Salami
- Edited by: Adelaja Adebayo
- Music by: Anu Afolayan; Kent Edunjobi
- Production company: Lasun Ray Films
- Release date: 2017
- Running time: 118 minutes
- Country: Nigeria
- Language: English

The Bridge is a 2017 Nigerian film produced and directed by Kunle Afolayan.

== Plot ==
A prince from a royal family decides to marry a lady from a wealthy home but their parents do not agree to their relationship due to tribal differences. As a result of this they get married secretly. This leads to things falling apart in their lives.

== Cast ==
- Chidinma as Stella Maxwell
- Demola Adedoyin as Obadore Adeyemi
- Kunle Afolayan as Jire
- Zack Orji as Dominic Maxwell
- Tina Mba as Mrs. Maxwell
- Prof. Ayo Akinwale as Obe Adeyemi
- Binta Ayo Mogaji as Olori Omolade
- Ken Erics as Augustine
- Peter Johnson as Pascal
- Akinruli Akinola as Arinze
