= Namir Abdel Messeeh =

French film director (born 1974)

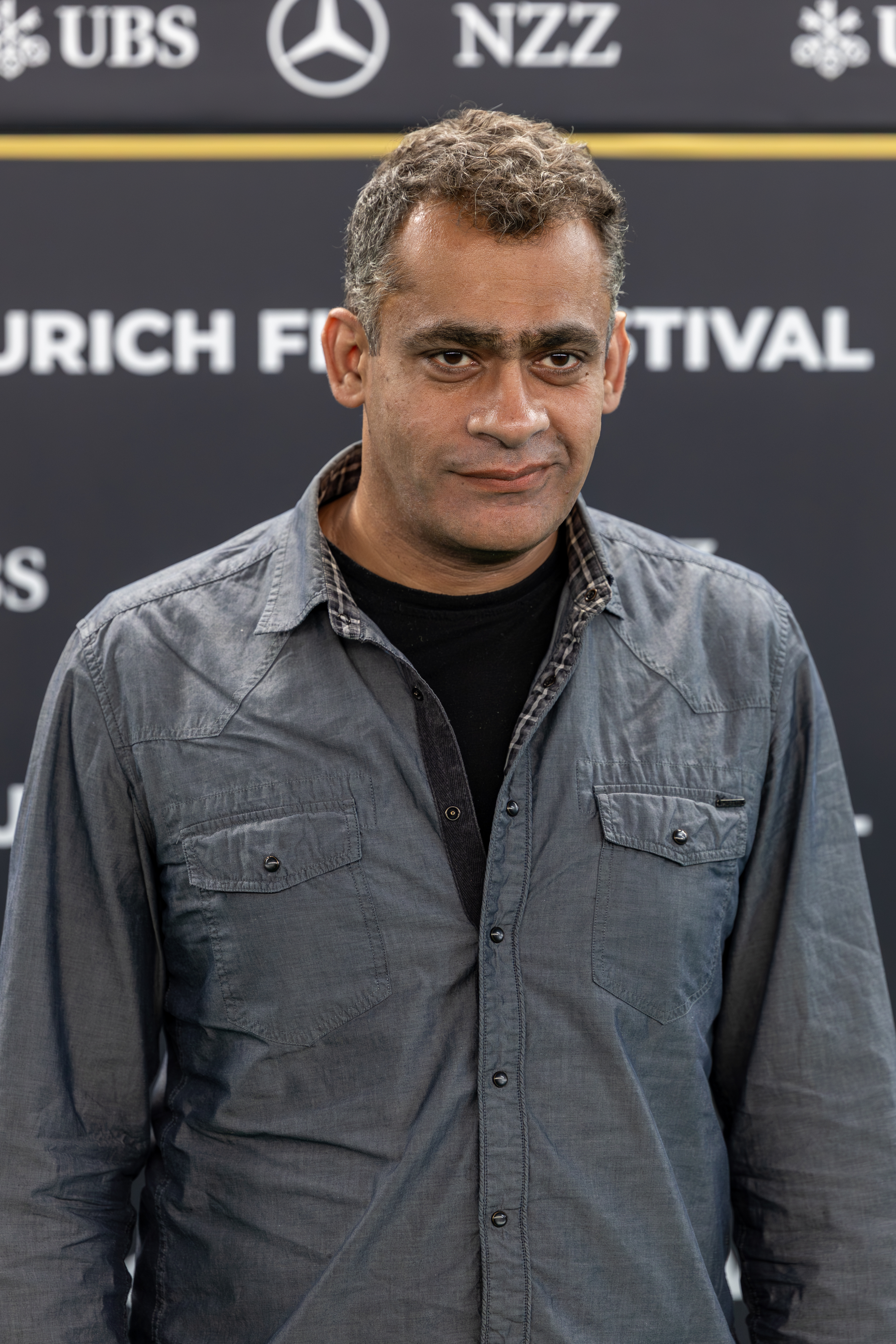
- Namir Abdel Messeeh at the 2025 Zurich Film Festival.
- Born: 1974 (age 51–52); Egypt
- Education: La Fémis; University of Paris VII (MA)
- Occupation: Film director

Namir Abdel Messeeh (born 1974) is an Egyptian and French film director.

Messeeh was born in Egypt and grew up in France. He graduated from La Fémis in 2000 and obtained an MA in cinema studies from the University of Paris VII.

His short documentary You, Waguih discusses the political imprisonment of his father as a communist under President Nasser.

His documentary The Virgin, the Copts and Me premiered at the Doha Tribeca Film Festival. It won Outstanding Documentary Film at the Arab Film Festival in 2012 and Best Documentary at the 2013 African International Film Festival. It discusses the topic of Marian apparitions believed by many Egyptian Christians (Copts) to have occurred in Egypt.

His second full-length documentary Life After Siham premiered at the 2025 Cannes Film Festival.

== Filmography ==
- Something Bad (2005)
- You, Waguih (2005)
- The Virgin, the Copts and Me (2011)
- Life after Siham (2025)
