= Diamonds in the Sky =

2019 Nigerian drama film

- Directed by: Kunle Afolayan
- Written by: Tunde Babalola
- Produced by: Femi Adebayo
- Starring: Femi Adebayo; Omowumi Dada; Joke Silva; Ali Nuhu; Bolaji Oba; Toyin Abraham
- Cinematography: Toka McBaror
- Edited by: Isaac Benjamin
- Music by: Afolayan Anu; Kent Edunjobi
- Production company: Leah Foundation
- Release date: 10 February 2019
- Running time: 112 minutes
- Country: Nigeria
- Language: English

Diamonds in the Sky is a 2018 Nigerian drama film directed by Kunle Afolayan and produced by Femi Adebayo. The film stars Femi Adebayo, Omowumi Dada, and Joke Silva with Ali Nuhu, Bolaji Oba, and Toyin Abraham in supporting roles. The film tells the story of three families that struggle when cancer affects their lives.

The film received mostly positive critics' acclaim and screened worldwide. The film was nominated for 11 Best of Nollywood Awards including Best Actress in a Supporting Role, Best Actress (English) and Best Director.

== Cast ==
- Femi Adebayo as Kayode
- Omowumi Dada as Teniola
- Joke Silva as Aisha Dalhatu
- Ali Nuhu as Faisal Dalhaty
- Bolaji Oba as Ibrahim Dalhatu
- Toyin Abraham as Yesimi Gbeborun
- Yvonne Jegede as Halima
- Mogaji Majinyawa as Uncle Idi
- Adebayo Salami as Kayode's Dad
- Ayo Mogaji as Kayode's Mum
- Kayode Olaiya as Akanbi Aliyu
- Bimbo Akintola as Labake Aliyu
- Yemi Shodimu as Brainmoh Soji
- Faith Oyeniran as Supo Akanbi
- Farid Olajogun as Rele Akanbi
- Ebun Oloyede as Salamander
- Adeola Okanipekun as Salewa
- Ayo Akinwale as Dr. Abdulabi
- Olayinka Yusuf as Foreman
- Adamu Suabu as Gateman
- Yemi Adeite as Housemaid
- Anuolowapo Janeth as Housemaid
- Bada Michael as Driver
- Ayomide A. Adebayo as Nurse

== Awards and nominations ==
Year	Award	Category	Result	Ref
2019	Best of Nollywood Awards	Best Actress in a Lead role – English	Nominated	
2019	Best of Nollywood Awards	Best Supporting Actress – English	Nominated	
2019	Best of Nollywood Awards	Movie with the Best Cinematography	Won	
2019	Best of Nollywood Awards	Movie of the Year	Nominated	
2019	Best of Nollywood Awards	Movie with the Best Sound	Nominated	
2019	Best of Nollywood Awards	Best Movie with Social message	Nominated	
2019	Best of Nollywood Awards	Director of the Year	Nominated	
2019	Best of Nollywood Awards	Best Kiss in a Movie	Nominated	
2019	Best of Nollywood Awards	Movie with the Best Screenplay	Nominated	
2019	Best of Nollywood Awards	Movie with the Best Production Design	Nominated	
