= Jane Munene-Murago =

Kenyan film director

- Citizenship: Kenyan
- Occupation: Filmmaker
- Notable work: The Tender One

Jane Munene-Murago is a Kenyan filmmaker, the first woman to study film in Kenya. Most of her films have been documentaries, produced through her company CineArts, on issues affecting women.

== Early life and education ==
Munene grew up in Nairobi. She attended Ngara girls' high school and then later joined Kenya High School.

In 1976 Munene studied at the government-run Kenya Institute of Mass Communication (KIMC), and was the only woman among KIMC's first year of graduates.

== Career ==
Munene's first documentary, The Tender One (1979), was made with United Nations support as part of the International Year of the Child.

Unbroken Spirit (2011) is a portrait of Monica Wangu Wamwere, the mother of human rights activist Koigi wa Wamwere, who took part alongside Wangari Maathai in the 1992 Mothers' Hunger Strike to release political prisoners. The film was shown at the New York African Film Festival 2012.

Murago-Munene is a former chair of the Kenya National Film Association.

As of 2016 she was executive director of FEPACI.

== Awards ==
Munene won the Lifetime Achievement Award of the 2012 Kalasha International Film and TV Awards.

== Filmography ==
Year	Title	Role	Category	Ref
1979	The Tender One	Director	Documentary	
1991	The Chosen One	Co-director with Dommie Yambo-Odotte	Documentary	
1994	Women, Water and Workload	Director	Documentary	
1995	Enkishon: the Maasai Child in Kenya	Director	Documentary	
2000	Out of Silence	Director	Documentary	
2003	The Price of a Daughter	Director	Documentary	
2004	Behind Closed Doors	Director	Documentary	
2008	Turning Tide: Women Entrepreneurs in Africa	Director	Documentary	
2010	Monica Wangu Wamwere:Unbroken Spirit	Director	Documentary	
