= October 1 (film) =

2014 Nigerian film directed by Kunle Afolayan

- Theatrical release poster
- Directed by: Kunle Afolayan
- Written by: Tunde Babalola
- Produced by: Kunle Afolayan
- Starring: Sadiq Daba; Kayode Olaiya; Demola Adedoyin
- Cinematography: Yinka Edward
- Edited by: Mike-Steve Adeleye
- Music by: Kulanen Ikyo
- Production company: Golden Effects
- Distributed by: Golden Effects; FilmOne
- Release dates: 28 September 2014 (Lagos); 3 October 2014
- Running time: 145 minutes
- Country: Nigeria
- Languages: English; Yoruba; Igbo; Hausa
- Budget: US$2 million
- Box office: ₦100 million

October 1 is a 2014 Nigerian thriller film written by Tunde Babalola, produced and directed by Kunle Afolayan, and starring Sadiq Daba, Kayode Olaiya, and Demola Adedoyin. The film is set in the last months of Colonial Nigeria in 1960. It recounts the fictional story of Danladi Waziri (Daba), a police officer from Northern Nigeria, investigating a series of killings of young women in the remote Western Nigeria village of Akote just before 1 October 1960 – the date Nigeria gained independence from British colonial rule.

October 1 was produced with a budget of US$2 million (₦315 million in 2013) in Lagos, Ilara-Mokin, Akure, and villages neighbouring Akure, using period costumes and props, from August to September 2013. The film premiered on 28 September 2014 and opened to international audiences on 3 October. The film earned just over ₦100 million (US$610,000 in 2014) within six months of its release; Afolayan blamed film piracy for the film's low earnings.

October 1 deals with several themes, including the sexual abuse of children by religious authority figures, religious and ethnic conflict, politics in Colonial Nigeria, and Nigeria's unification and independence. Critics reviewed the film positively, praising its cinematography, production design and costuming, writing, and acting. The film also won several awards, including Best Feature Film, Best Screenplay, and Best Actor at the 2014 Africa International Film Festival.

== Plot ==
Police inspector Danladi Waziri is summoned by the British colonial authorities to present his findings on a series of rapes and murders of young women in Akote, a remote village in Western Nigeria. Upon his arrival in Akote, he is received by Sergeant Afonja, who tells him that a man on horseback being admired by several villagers is Prince Aderopo, the first of their community to graduate from university. As he begins his investigation, Waziri notices a pattern in the killings and concludes that the rapes and murders are the work of a serial killer. In the evening, while Aderopo is meeting with his childhood friends Tawa and Agbekoya in the village bar, one of his guards deserts his post to spend time with his lover. At the bar, Baba Ifa, the town's chief priest, warns Waziri and Afonja that the killings will continue until the murderer is satisfied. The next day, the dead body of the guard's lover is discovered.

Waziri orders the arrest of Baba Ifa, but Afonja refuses. Waziri suspends him and replaces him with his deputy, Corporal Omolodun. The body of an Igbo girl is discovered and Omolodun trails the killer along a bush path; the killer then kills Omolodun. Okafor, the girl's father, and his fellow tribesmen capture a travelling Hausa man, claiming that he is the serial killer. The accused man is taken into custody, but he maintains his innocence and tells Waziri that the actual perpetrator was whistling a tune. Waziri informs his superiors that he has found the murderer and will be closing the case. Okafor throws a machete at the man during his transfer, piercing his heart; as he is dying, the man continues to insist that he did not kill the girl.

After leaving a celebration of the investigation's closure, Waziri hears whistling and is assaulted by the killer. Although he is too drunk to identify him, he slowly remembers the killer's face as he recovers at Afonja's home. The next morning, he goes to the market square to observe the body language of Aderopo. Waziri visits Tawa and discovers that Aderopo and Agbekoya both received the same scholarship from Reverend Dowling, the village priest. Waziri visits Agbekoya, who reveals that Dowling molested him and Aderopo.

At an independence celebration, Aderopo invites Tawa to their childhood hideout, which has been renovated. Waziri and Afonja attempt to trail them, but are unsuccessful; Agbekoya, the only other person who knows the location of the hideout, leads them there. As they arrive, Aderopo is about to make Tawa his sixth victim, symbolizing the six years that he was abused by Dowling. Waziri and Afonja save Tawa. Waziri subsequently presents his account of the investigation to the British, who instruct him to withhold Aderopo's identity; he reluctantly agrees to do so for the sake of a peaceful independence.

== Cast ==
- Sadiq Daba as Inspector Danladi Waziri
- Kayode Aderupoko as Inspector Sunday Afonja
- Demola Adedoyin as Prince Aderopo
- Kehinde Bankole as Miss Tawa
- Kunle Afolayan as Agbekoya
- Fabian Adeoye Lojede as Corporal Omolodun
- Ogagbe Oghenechovwe Blessing as Musa
- Kanayo O. Kanayo as Okafor
- Ibrahim Chatta as Sumonu
- Bimbo Manuel as Canon Kuforiji
- Femi Adebayo as Banji
- Abiodun Aleja as Olaitan
- Nick Rhys as Winterbottom
- Deola Sagoe as Funmilayo Ransome-Kuti
- David Bailie as Ackerman
- Colin David Reese as Reverend Dowling
- Lawrence Stubbings as Tomkins
- Ifayemi Elebuibon as Baba Ifa
- Meg Otanwa as Yejide

== Production ==
The idea for the October 1 came from Kunle Afolayan's desire to direct a story set in a small community. Several writers submitted scripts before he met Tunde Babalola, who was eventually hired to write the screenplay, originally titled Dust. Afolayan also contributed to the script. Although Afolayan did not want to film a big-budget production, he eventually concluded that the script required one because he wanted to produce a "national film" that appealed to both younger and older audiences: "For the older generation, especially those who were part of independence, they will be able to see themselves in this film. For the younger generation it's a platform – many of them who don't know the story of Nigeria."

October 1's US$2 million budget (₦315 million in 2013) came from several governmental and corporate entities, including the Lagos State Government, Toyota Nigeria, Elizade Motors, Guinness, and Sovereign Trust Insurance. Over a thousand actors auditioned for the film. Afolayan stated that he selected Sadiq Daba to play Waziri because he wanted someone from the north of Nigeria who could speak Hausa and had a "look" that matched the film's 1960s aesthetics. Afolayan cast Deola Sagoe, the film's costume designer, as Funmilayo Ransome-Kuti – a Nigerian independence activist – because her features were similar to members of the Ransome-Kuti family. Afolayan also starred as Agbekoya.

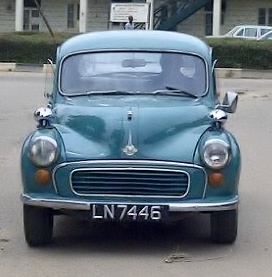
A 1964 Morris Minor, restored for use in the film

Filming began in August 2013 in Lagos, with additional shooting in Ilara-Mokin, Akure, and villages neighbouring Akure. The production team was made up of approximately a hundred people and the film was shot using Red cameras. Modern inventions captured during principal photography were digitally removed during post-production. Shooting ended in September after 42 days.

Almost half of the props used in October 1 were made by art director Pat Nebo. Others were sourced from the United States and the United Kingdom, including television sets and shotguns from the 1950s, as the Nigeria Police Force had not kept old gear and they were otherwise not available domestically. Some of the antique vehicles used in the film were obtained in Nigeria; many were refurbished. Sagoe designed the period costumes. The costume designers watched documentaries and researched archival material to capture the style of 1960s Nigeria. Cinematographer Yinka Edward said he used natural-looking lighting to capture a realistic look because he wanted to tie the cinematography to Aderopo's emotional state.

October 1 featured a score by Kulanen Ikyo, as well as the songs "Mama E" and "Bo Ko Daya" by Victor Olaiya, and "Sunny Sunny Day", written by Yvonne Denobis and produced by Ikyo.

== Release ==
October 1's first poster was released in June 2013, showing the Nigerian and British flags flying over a dusty town. In September, the filmmakers unveiled a set of character posters. The first trailer was released on 1 October 2013, Nigeria's 53rd Independence Day. The trailer won the "Best Fiction Film Trailer" award at the 2013 International Movie Trailers Festival Awards.

October 1 was originally set for release on 1 October 2013. In March 2014, Afolayan was unable to specify a release date, stating that he was avoiding releasing it at the same time as Render to Caesar, Half of a Yellow Sun, '76, and Dazzling Mirage. The filmmakers also announced that several versions would be released, including one for Nigerian audiences, one for a wider African audience, one for film festivals, and an international release version. Terra Kulture, a Nigerian arts promoter, organized private screenings prior to the film's wider release.

October 1 premiered at the Eko Hotels and Suites in Lagos on 28 September 2014. The event had a 1960s theme, featuring an exhibition with tours of the sets and displays of the film's costumes and props. Advanced screenings began on 1 October 2014 and the film opened to a general audience on 3 October 2014. October 1 was screened at the 2014 Cultural Confidence event, hosted by the Nollywood Diaspora Film Series at New York University on 11 October 2014. The film was also officially selected for the 2014 Africa International Film Festival. The film's European premiere was in London on 3 November 2014 at the 2014 Film Africa Festival. October 1 also opened the 4th Africa Film Week in Greece.

The Nation estimated that October 1 grossed approximately ₦60 million (US$360,000 in 2014) as of January 2015. In an interview with The Netng in February 2015, Afolayan disclosed that the film had earned just over ₦100 million (US$610,000 in 2014) in six months. In April 2015, Afolayan learned that the film had been pirated, causing him to lash out on Twitter against the Igbo people in Eastern Nigeria, whom he perceived to be the source of the piracy; Afolayan quickly apologised for his remarks. He also questioned whether piracy would affect the film's profits going forward.

In December 2014, October 1 was released on DStv Explora's video-on-demand service. The following month, Afolayan announced that Netflix had acquired online distribution rights for the film, making it one of the first Nollywood films to be featured on Netflix. A behind-the-scenes documentary aired on DStv's Africa Magic channel in September 2014.

== Themes ==
Critics noted that October 1 addresses several themes, including the sexual abuse of children by religious authority figures, religious and ethnic conflict, politics and human rights in Colonial Nigeria, and Nigeria's unification and independence.

Many critics observed that October 1 critiques colonial rule in Nigeria through a variety of lenses. Filmmaker Onyeka Nwelue described the film as "sharpen[ing] the veracity of a society torn apart by its tribalism". Wilfred Okiche of YNaija linked the film's character study of psychological abuse with the nation's political dysfunction, which is rooted in a colonial logic of consolidating several tribal groups in one country. In The Nation, Victor Akande highlighted the film's commentary on the colonial mentality, pointing to Aderopo and Agbekoya's belief that Western education would improve them, while actually moving them away from tradition. Akande and Yishau Olukorede have noted that audiences would recognize parallels between those themes and the Boko Haram insurgency's criticism of Western education. Additionally, Jane Agouye, writing in The Punch, described the serial murders as a metaphor for the "rape of the country's natural resources by the white men". Toni Kan, reviewing the film in This Day, concluded that the film captured a "collective" anticipation about "the coming of independence, the beginning of a new era".

Scholars have likewise addressed October 1 from the perspective of the collective trauma that colonialism has imposed on Nigeria. Ezinne Michaelia Ezepue and Chidera G. Nwafor have argued that Afolayan "advocates for decolonization" by using the film's characters as stand-ins for the psychosocial effects of British colonial rule on Nigeria. Azeez Akinwumi Sesan has focused on the film's "rhetoric of return" to "selfhood and nationhood ... through the characterization and representation of collective catharsis as a product of the collective unconscious of a people or race". Osakue Stevenson Omoera has addressed the film from a human rights perspective, linking the film's exploration of sexual violence and ethnic tensions to contemporary sociopolitical issues in Nigeria.

The cast and crew of October 1 found similar themes in the film. Babalola said that "[t]he story depicted how independence affected the tribes in Nigeria" and that the film "is a metaphor of Nigeria and the many discriminatory things that happened to the land". Daba stated that the film "cuts across the whole of Nigeria and back to our colonial days. It talks about our ethnic intra-relationships and many more". Afolayan described the moral of the film as "the last line by one of the colonialists ... who said, 'Good or bad it is your country now'".

== Reception ==
October 1 received generally positive reviews. Amarachukwu Iwuala, writing for Pulse, applauded the cinematography, production design and costuming, writing, and acting. In This Day, Toni Kan commended the writing and casting, praising Kehinde Bankole for her portrayal of Tawa. Kan also praised the direction and plot, noting that although the killer is presented from the beginning of the film, Afolayan leaves the audience doubting whether they have actually interpreted the evidence correctly. Nollywood Reinvented awarded the film a rating of 72%, praising its writing, but criticising the first half of the film for making it "too easy" for the audience to guess the killer's identity. Onykea Nwelule likewise praised the writing for crisp dialogue and the film's historical accuracy, calling the film "the work of a genius", but he wrote that he would have liked the film to feature historical figures involved in Nigeria's independence movement. Augustine Ogwo praised the film's cinematography, casting, and set design. He concluded that the film "will definitely stand the test of time" and predicted that it would generate continuing discussions on national issues. Wilfred Okiche of YNaija praised the film's production design, but noted "some niggling issues with live action scenes and vivid stunts". Isabella Akinseye of Nolly Silver Screen rated the film 3.4 out of 5 stars, stating that the film attempted to do too much, distracting from its cinematography, costume, production design and acting, which she praised. The film scholar Babatunde Onikoyi said that the film exemplifies Afolayan's status as a director of New Nigerian Cinema.

=== Accolades ===
October 1 Best Feature Film and Best Screenplay at the 2014 Africa International Film Festival; Sadiq Daba won Best Actor. The film also received 12 nominations at the 2015 Africa Magic Viewers Choice Awards and won nine, including Best Movie of the Year and Best Movie Director; Kehinde Bankole won Best Actress.

List of accolades received by October 1
Award	Date of Ceremony	Category	Recipients	Result	Ref.
2014 Africa International Film Festival	16 November 2014	Best Feature Film	Kunle Afolayan	Won	
2014 Africa International Film Festival	16 November 2014	Best Screenplay	Tunde Babalola	Won	
2014 Africa International Film Festival	16 November 2014	Best Actor	Sadiq Daba	Won	
2015 Pan African Film Festival	16 February 2015	Best Narrative Feature	Kunle Afolayan	Nominated	
2015 Pan African Film Festival	16 February 2015	Programmers' Award – Narrative Feature	Kunle Afolayan	Won	
2015 Africa Magic Viewers' Choice Awards	7 March 2015	Best Movie of the Year	Kunle Afolayan	Won	
2015 Africa Magic Viewers' Choice Awards	7 March 2015	Best Movie Director	Kunle Afolayan	Won	
2015 Africa Magic Viewers' Choice Awards	7 March 2015	Best Movie (Drama)	Kunle Afolayan	Nominated	
2015 Africa Magic Viewers' Choice Awards	7 March 2015	Best Actress in a Drama	Kehinde Bankole	Won	
2015 Africa Magic Viewers' Choice Awards	7 March 2015	Best Sound Editor	Kulanen Ikyo	Won	
2015 Africa Magic Viewers' Choice Awards	7 March 2015	Best Video Editor	Mike Steve Adeleye	Nominated	
2015 Africa Magic Viewers' Choice Awards	7 March 2015	Best Art Director	Pat Nebo	Won	
2015 Africa Magic Viewers' Choice Awards	7 March 2015	Best Cinematographer	Yinka Edward	Nominated	
2015 Africa Magic Viewers' Choice Awards	7 March 2015	Best Costume Designer	Deola Sagoe & Obijie Oru	Won	
2015 Africa Magic Viewers' Choice Awards	7 March 2015	Best Drama Writer	Tunde Babalola	Won	
2015 Africa Magic Viewers' Choice Awards	7 March 2015	Best Lighting Designer	Lanre Omofaye	Won	
2015 Africa Magic Viewers' Choice Awards	7 March 2015	Best Make-Up Artist	Lola Maja	Won	
11th Africa Movie Academy Awards	26 September 2015	Best Film	Kunle Afolayan	Nominated	
11th Africa Movie Academy Awards	26 September 2015	Best Director	Kunle Afolayan	Nominated	
11th Africa Movie Academy Awards	26 September 2015	Best Actor in a Leading Role	Sadiq Daba	Won	
11th Africa Movie Academy Awards	26 September 2015	Most Promising Actor	Demola Adedoyin	Nominated	
11th Africa Movie Academy Awards	26 September 2015	Best Nigerian Film	Kunle Afolayan	Won	
11th Africa Movie Academy Awards	26 September 2015	Achievement in Editing	Mike Steve Adeleye	Nominated	
11th Africa Movie Academy Awards	26 September 2015	Achievement in Costume Design	Deola Sagoe & Obijie Oru	Won	
11th Africa Movie Academy Awards	26 September 2015	Achievement in Production Design	Yinka Edward	Nominated	

== See also ==
- List of Nigerian films of 2014
- Cinema of Nigeria
- Decolonisation of Africa
