= Cute Abiola =

Nigerian comedian (born 1996)

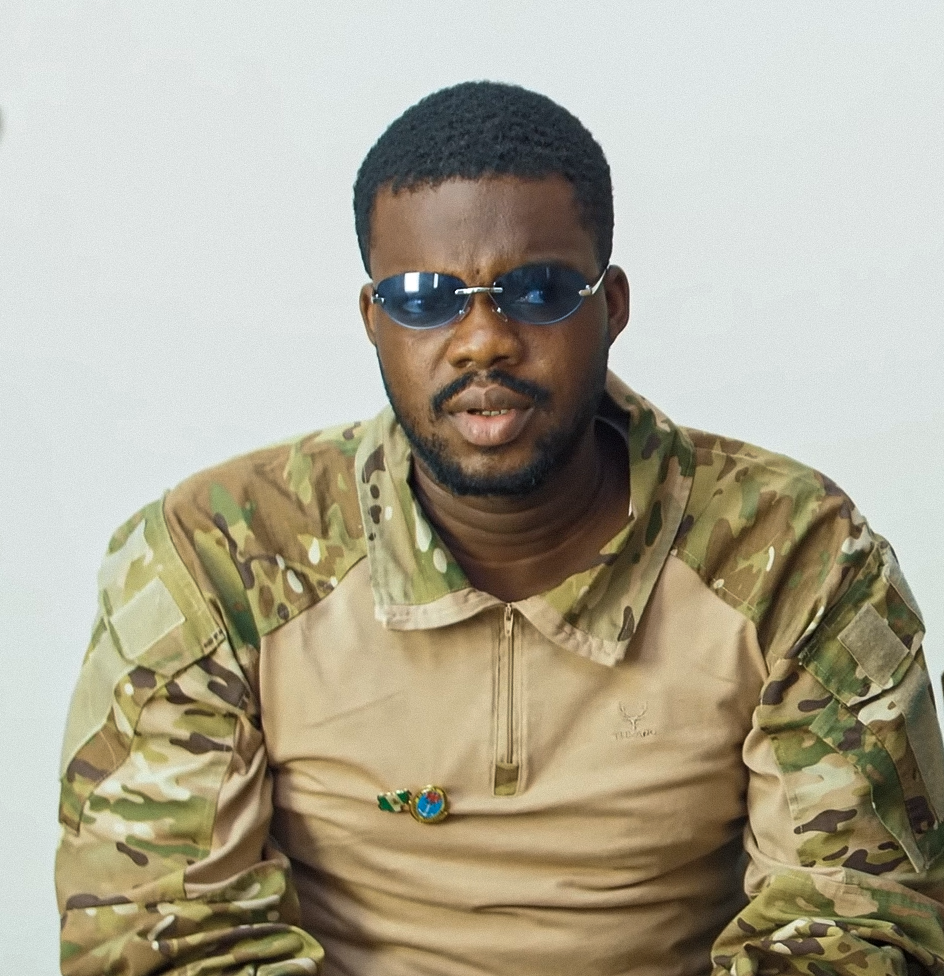
- ThecuteAbiola in 2026
- Born: Abdulgafar Ahmad Oluwatoyin; 28 April 1995 (age 31); Kwara State, Ilorin, Nigeria
- Other names: The Cute Abiola; Lawyer Kunle; Ankara Gucci
- Education: Krawa State Polytechnic
- Occupations: Actor; Comedian; content creator; social media influencer; navy officer (former)
- Years active: 2009–present
- Spouse: Kudirat Mosunmola (m. 2021)
- Children: 2
- Military career
- Allegiance: Nigeria
- Branch: Nigerian Navy
- Service years: 2018–2022
- Rank: Sub-Lieutenant

YouTube information
- Channel: THECUTE ABIOLA STUDIOS
- Years active: 2015–present
- Genre: Movies
- Subscribers: 535 thousand
- Views: 71 million
- Last updated: 20 June 2026

Abdulgafar Ahmad Oluwatoyin (born 28 April 1995), better known by his stage name Cute Abiola, or The Cute Abiola is a Nigerian actor, comedian, social media personality, and content creator. He is also known for portraying the recurring comedy character Lawyer Kunle.

Before pursuing a full-time career in entertainment, Oluwatoyin served as a Sub-Lieutenant in the Nigerian Navy.

Oluwatoyin received a nomination for Best Online Social Content Creator at the 2023 Africa Magic Viewers’ Choice Awards in recognition of his skit VIP Bathroom. He also received the Golden Stars Awards for Outstanding Impact as a Skit Maker. As an actor, he is known for portraying Bada in the comedy-drama film Everybody Loves Jenifa (2024) and for his role in the Yoruba-language comedy-drama series Ile Alayo.

== Early life and education ==
Abdulgafar Ahmad Oluwatoyin was born on 28 April 1995 in Ilorin, Kwara State, Nigeria. He was raised in a Muslim family and spent his early years in Ilorin, where he received his primary and secondary education. Oluwatoyin later enrolled at Kwara State Polytechnic and graduated with a Higher National Diploma (HND).

== Military service and career ==
Cute Abiola began his comedy career during his secondary school days by participating in stage drama. His first stage performance was in 2009/10. He later moved into content creation, gaining wider recognition through comedy skits and screen performances.

In 2015, Cute Abiola created an Instagram account and began posting comedy skits, starting with 15-second skits. His skits were inspired by his parents, whose mannerisms and accent he used in his performances. And lived in Ilorin for 18 years, where he developed the accent he used in his skits.

In March 7, 2018, he enlisted in the Nigerian Navy, where he began his training at the Nigerian Navy Training School as a cadet naval officer. He later served Sub-Lieutenant (OSCOMP). After joining the Nigerian Navy, Cute Abiola continued producing comedy content. The difficulty of combining the two careers eventually led to his departure from the Nigerian Navy in 2022, after which he focused on entertainment full time.

In an Interview on HipTV Cute Abiola described his time in the Navy as the most critical part of his life, he stated.

"That time was the most critical part of my life, and I was still able to achieve shooting content and being in the Navy. That was very, very hard. I used to be at work from Mondays to Saturdays most times, and all my contents still used to be out there. In a week, I used to post twice or three times".

— Cute Abiola

In 2021, Cute Abiola starred in the Yoruba-language comedy-drama series Ile Alayo, directed by Femi Adebayo, featuring Broda Shaggi and Mr Macaroni. That same year, He also appeared in the YouTube web series SiSi, portraying his recurring comedy character, Lawyer Kunle.

In November 2022, Cute Abiola was appointed Senior Special Assistant (SSA) on Creative Industries to Kwara State Governor, Abdulrahman Abdulrazaq. In 2023, he received a nomination at the Africa Magic Viewers’ Choice Awards (AMVCA) for Best Online Social Content Creator for his skit VIP Bathroom. The same year, he produced the film Shattered Innocence, and also starred alongside Chimezie Imo, Iyabo Ojo, and Jide Kosoko. and also starred in The Bloom Boys, alongside Timini Egbuson and Shaffy Bello.

In 2024, he starred in the film Everybody Loves Jenifa, where he played Bada, appearing alongside Funke Akindele and other members of the cast. In 2026, Cute Abiola starred in Kilanko: The Invincible Child.

== Personal life ==
Cute Abiola married Khudrah (Kudirat) Mosunmola in 2021 in a private wedding ceremony in Ogbomoso, Oyo State. There was no public announcement of the wedding, although photographs from the ceremony were circulated on social media. Following reports of the marriage, Instagram influencer Adeherself denied speculation that she had been engaged to Abiola or had been in a relationship with him. The couple have two sons.

== Controversies ==
In November 2021, while serving in the Nigerian Navy, Cute Abiola was detained after being accused of violating the Armed Forces' social media policy. His detention attracted public attention after colleagues and associates reported that they had been unable to contact him. The Nigerian Navy later confirmed that he was in military custody and stated that he had been detained for breaching regulations governing the use of military uniforms and social media by service personnel. After a military disciplinary process, Cute Abiola was released from detention and assigned one month of "extra duty" as a corrective measure.

The incident received widespread media coverage and prompted public discussion about the application of military regulations to personnel engaged in careers outside their official duties. Cute Abiola later left the Nigerian Navy in 2022 and continued his career in entertainment.

In 2026, Cute Abiola drew public attention after issuing a public apology to former First Lady Patience Jonathan for participating in the online ridicule of her emotional reaction to the 2014 abduction of the Chibok schoolgirls. In a statement shared on social media, he said that the continued incidence of kidnapping in Nigeria had led him to reconsider the significance of her televised remarks, describing them as an expression of empathy rather than a subject for ridicule.

== Discography ==
=== Singles ===
List of singles
Song title	Year	Featured artist(s)	Album
"Trouble"	2021	(feat. Cute Abiola, Mr Real, Mickey De Viper & Dj Ab)	Non-album single
"Afro Lambo"	2025	—N/a	Non-album single
"Cut Soap For Me (Efuwalose)"	2026	Tolibian	Non-album single

== Filmography ==
†	Denotes works that have not yet been released

=== Films ===
Year	Title	Role	Notes
2021	Ewon Ife	Benjamin	Main role
2023	The Bloom Boys	Chef (Mr Fellow Human)	Recurring role
2023	Shattered Innocence	Cute Abiola	Main role (Also served as producer)
2024	A Girl Like Her	Wasiu	Main role
2024	Everybody Loves Jenifa	Bada	Supporting role
2026	Kilanko: The Invincible Child		Supporting role

=== Television ===
Year	Title	Role	Notes
2021	Ile Alayo	biola	Recurring
2021	Sisi	Lawyer Kunle	Webseries

== Awards and nominations ==
Year	Award	Category	Result	Ref.
2019	MAYA Awards Africa	Best Online Comedy Award	Won	
2020	City People Entertainment Awards	Comedy act of the year	Nominated	
2021	Nigeria Skits Industry Awards	Most consistent costume	Nominated	
2023	Africa Magic Viewers' Choice Awards	Best Online Social Content Creator	Nominated	
2023	Golden Stars Award	Outstanding impact as a skit maker	Won	
2023	Golden Stars Award	Public servant	Won	
2024	Silverbird Awards	Influencer of the year	Nominated	
