= Adeyemi Afolayan =

Nigerian film actor (1940–1996)

- Born: Adeyemi Josiah Afolayan; 1940
- Died: 1996 (aged 55–56)
- Other name: Ade Love
- Citizenship: Nigeria
- Occupations: actor; filmmaker; producer; director; dramatist
- Years active: 1966–1996
- Children: Kunle Afolayan (son); Tayo Afolayan (son); Shina Afolayan (son); Gabriel Afolayan (Son); Moji Afolayan (daughter); Aremu Afolayan (son)
- Relatives: Toyin Afolayan (sister)

Adeyemi Josiah Afolayan (1940–1996) was a Nigerian actor, filmmaker, dramatist and producer.

== Early life ==
Afolayan was born in 1940 in Kwara state Nigeria. He was a film actor, director, and producer. He is the brother of actress Toyin Afolayan as well as father to film actors, Kunle Afolayan, Tayo Afolayan, Gabriel Afolayan, Moji Afolayan and Aremu Afolayan.

== Career ==
In 1966, Afolayan joined Moses Olaiya's drama troupe. In 1971, he left to establish his own drama group, which went on to stage comedic plays.

In 1976, he appeared in Ola Balogun's Ajani Ogun and later produced and starred Ija Ominira (1979), also directed by Balogun. Kadara, also called Destiny in English was the first movie he wrote, produced, and also starred as the leading actor. The movie was shown at the ninth Tashkent film festival for African and Asian cinema. Afolayan went on to produce and star in other productions such as Ija Orogun, Taxi Driver and Iya ni Wura.

== Filmography ==
- Ajani Ogun (1976)
- Ija Ominira (1979)
- Kadara (1980)
- Ija Orogun (1982)
- Taxi Driver (1983)
- Iya ni Wura (1984)
- Ayanmo (1986)
- Mosebolatan (1986)
- Taxi Driver 2 (1987)
- Ori Olori (1989)
- Eyin Oku (1992)

== See also ==
- List of Nigerian actors
