= Mokalik =

2019 Nigerian film

- Theatrical film poster
- Directed by: Kunle Afolayan
- Screenplay by: Tunde Babalola
- Story by: Kunle Afolayan
- Produced by: Kunle Afolayan
- Starring: Toni Afolayan; Femi Adebayo; Tobi Bakre; Fathia Balogun; Jumoke George; Simi (singer)
- Production company: Golden Effects Pictures/Africa Magic
- Distributed by: FilmOne
- Release date: 31 May 2019
- Running time: 99 minutes
- Country: Nigeria
- Languages: English; Yoruba
- Box office: ₦46.9million

Mokalik is a 2019 Nigerian Comedy film written by Tunde Babalola, produced and directed by Kunle Afolayan. The film stars Toni Afolayan and Femi Adebayo. Released on 31 May 2019, the film received positive reviews from critics. Mokalik was acquired by Netflix in July 2019, and was included as a part of the "Made in Africa" collection in May 2020.

== Plot ==
The story revolves around an 11-year-old boy, Ponmile, who is from the middle-class suburbs and spends the day as a lowly apprentice at a mechanic workshop in order to view and glance at life from other angles. When his father arrives to take him home, Ponmile has to make up his mind if he wants to return to school or take on his apprenticeship full-time on a long-term basis.

== Cast ==
- Toni Afolayan as Ponmile
- Femi Adebayo as Mr. Ogidan
- Wale Akorede as Baba Nepa
- Charles Okocha as Emeka
- Halimat Adegbola as Mama Goke
- Tobi Bakre as Goke
- Lateef Adedimeji as Tiri
- Ayo Adesanya as Ireti
- Ayo Ogunshina as Chairman
- Dayo Akinpelu as Ajentina
- Feyi Sheotan as Mulika
- Fathia Balogun as Iya Mulika
- Jumoke George as Iya Simi
- Simi Ogunleye as Simi
- Toyosi Benjamin as Otunba
- Popoola Tirimisiu as No Trouble
- Adenike Temiloluwa as Iya elewa agoyin
- Rasaq Olayiwola as Taofeek
- Damilola Ogunsi as Obama
- Ebun Oloyede as Daddy Jide
- Darimisire Afolayan as Larondo
- Hamzat Sheriffdeen as Kamoru
- Samuel Olasehinde as Erukutu
- Shola Olaibi as Labule
- John Bala as Baba Goke
- Faith Afolabi as Emeka's Girlfriend 1
- Banke Akinterinwa as Emeka's Girlfriend 2
- Jide Opoola as Uber driver

== Production ==
The filmmaker Kunle Afolayan cast his nephew Toni Afolayan in the main lead role who also eventually made his acting debut. Popular singer Simi also made her acting debut through this project and Tobi Bakre who participated in Big Brother Naija (season 3) also made his acting debut. The film was predominantly shot in a mechanical village and also in Agege and Lagos. The post-production works were done in Nigeria. The film was shot with a special flexible cinema camera Canon EOS C300 Mark II camera. The film director revealed that this film was made with the intention of releasing it in Yoruba language as it was his first major film in the Yoruba language.

== Reception ==
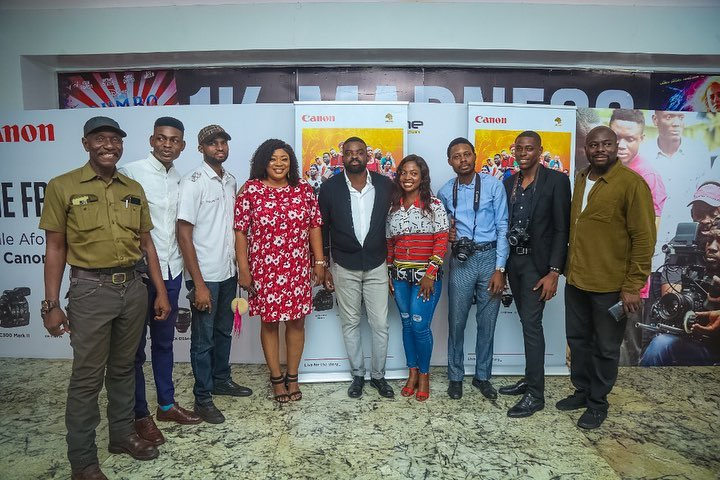
Mokalik Private Screening

Nollywood Post in its review praised the movie's accuracy "The drama, the mischief, the retail stores, the canteen, the graduation ceremony down to the costumes, excessive make-up use, and the chain of command in an environment like that was accurately portrayed."
