= The Unbroken Spirit =

2010 Kenyan drama film

- Directed by: Jane Munene-Murago
- Written by: Jane Munene-Murago
- Starring: Monica Wangu Wamwere
- Production company: CineArts Afrika
- Release date: 2010
- Running time: 71 minutes
- Country: Kenya
- Languages: English; Kikuyu

The Unbroken Spirit (theatrically as Monica Wangu Wamwere: The Unbroken Spirit), is a 2010 Kenyan documentary film directed by Jane Munene-Murago and produced by Danielle Ryan. The film revolves around a courageous mother Monica Wangu Wamwere and her three sons who locked up during the 1992 Mothers' Hunger Strike of multiparty democracy in Kenya and search for their justice and forty nine other detainees.

The film received critics acclaim and screened worldwide.
