= Chioma Ude =

Nigerian entertainment executive

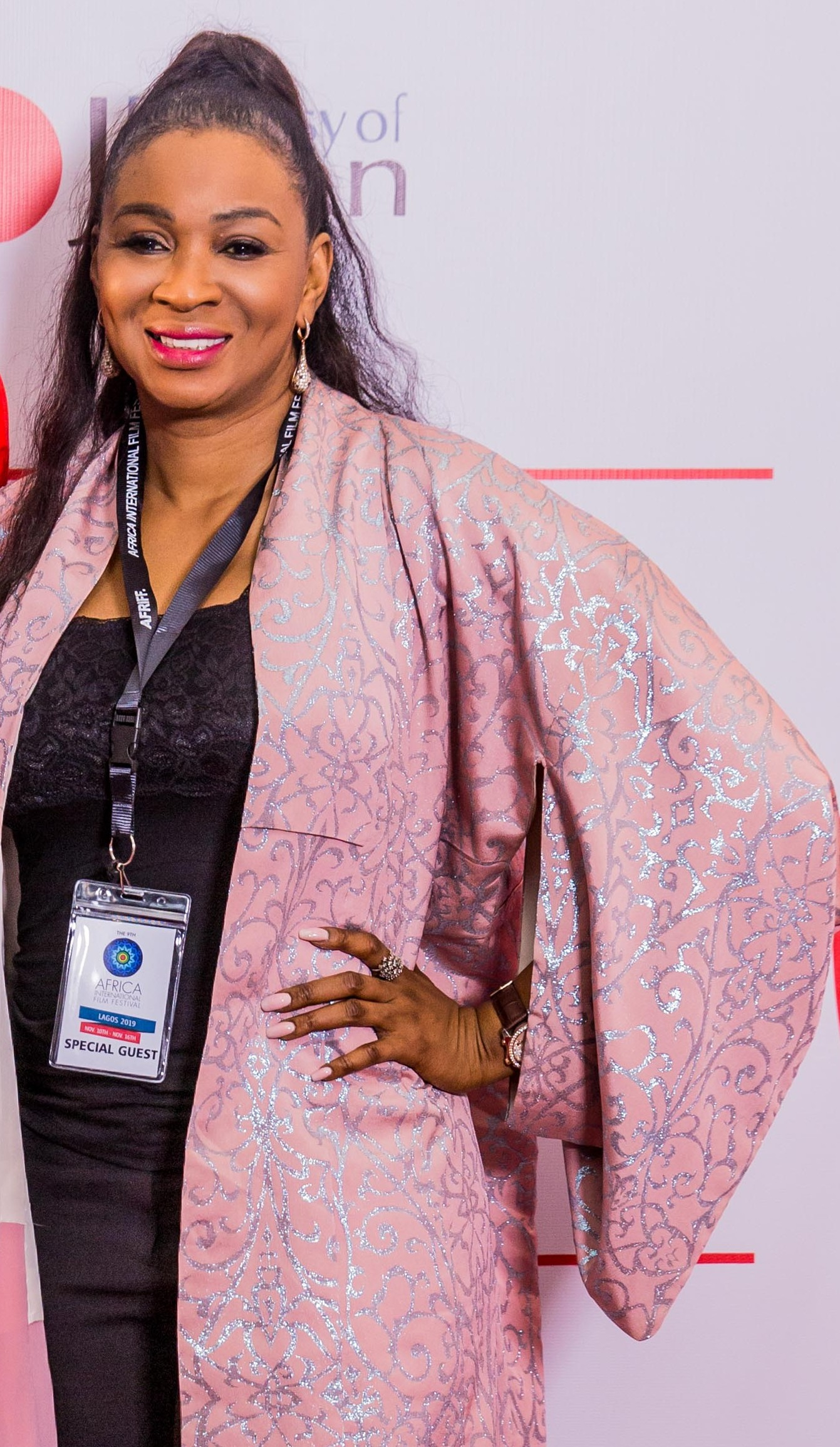
- at AFRIFF 2019
- Education: University of Nigeria
- Occupation: Actress
- Years active: 2010–present
- Notable work: Founder of African International Film Festival

Chioma Ude// is a Nigerian entertainment executive. In 2010, she founded Africa International Film Festival, a film festival held annually in Nigeria.

== Career ==
Ude founded AFRIFF in 2010, as a platform to train individuals in the film industry and then develop and monetize content for the public. At the Nigerian entertainment conference, she stated that the inability of indigenous filmmakers to adequately convey the language, story, and cultural elements of Nigerians into film was responsible for their non-selection at the Academy Awards. In October 2016, she spoke with the corporate world about AFRIFF in Lagos, explaining that the aim is to raise awareness of the benefits and potential of African cinema.

== Personal life ==
Ude has a degree in marketing from University of Nigeria, Nsukka.
