= Taiwo Hassan =

Nigerian actor (1959–2026)

- Born: Taiwo Babatunde Hassan; 31 October 1959; Ilaro, Ogun State, Nigeria
- Died: 23 August 2026 (aged 66)
- Other name: Ogogo
- Citizenship: Nigerian
- Occupations: Actor, screenwriter, film director and producer
- Years active: 1981–2026

Taiwo Babatunde Hassan ( (31 October 1959 – 23 August 2026), better known as Ogogo, was a Nigerian actor, screenwriter, producer and director known for his work in the Yoruba-language film industry.

== Early life and education ==
Hassan was born on 31 October 1959 in Ilaro, a town in Ogun State, Nigeria. He had a twin brother, and his family has a history of twins. His father and grandfather were both twins.

Hassan completed his primary education at Christ Church School in Ilaro. He attended Gazikia college in Lagos for his secondary education but was unable to finish it due to a financial problem. He then studied at a technical college and worked as an auto mechanic at the water corporation for about 13 years.

== Career ==
Hassan began his acting career in 1981 while working as an auto mechanic and later spent about 13 years at the Lagos Water Corporation, combining his job with his interest in acting.

Hassan left his job at the water corporation to concentrate on acting in 1994 . His decision came during the growth of Nigeria's home-video industry. He was particularly associated with Yoruba-language cinema and worked as an actor, producer, director and screenwriter. His career spanned more than four decades and included appearances in more than 300 Yoruba-language films. Among his film credits are Agbelebu, Dr Brown, Ekun-Ayo, Owo Blow, Omo Ghetto, Omin, Tenant of the House, Bank Alert and Aníkúlápó.

In 1996, he starred in Owo Blow, directed by Tade Ogidan. His performance in the film earned him the Best Actor of the Year award at the 1997 The Movie Award (THEMA 97).

In 2022, he appeared in Aníkúlápó, portraying Alaafin Ademuyiwa.He was nominated for Best Supporting Actor at the 2023 Africa Magic Viewers' Choice Awards for his performance in the film.

Hassan remained active in the Nigerian film industry into the 2020s, with his later credits including Amerah, Bank Alert and Aníkúlápó: Rise of the Spectre.

== Death ==
Hassan died on 23 August 2026, at the age of 66, after battling cancer. His daughter confirmed his death the same day. He had been diagnosed with stage IV cancer, and his daughters had appealed publicly for medical assistance earlier in August 2026. His death came five days after his family had dismissed reports that he had died, describing the earlier reports as false.

He was buried on 24 August 2026 in his hometown of Ilaro, Ogun State.

== Filmography ==
- Atitebi (1994)
- Agbelebu (1995)
- Agbo-Odaju (1995?)
- Danfo Driver (1995)
- Dr Brown (1995) (also writer)
- Eni Bi Okan (1995)
- Gogongo (Wind Pipe) (1995)
- Irawo Ayo (Lucky Star) (1995)
- Ede (Loro Oluwa) (1996)
- Ekun-Ayo (Tears of Joy) (1996) (also writer and producer)
- Iyawo Olele (Fancy Wife) (1996)
- Owo Blow parts 2,3 (1996) as Wole Owolabi.
- Adopted Child (Omo Agbato) (1997)
- Baba No Go Die (1997)
- Ore Ojiji.
- Omin (2008) as Adesina
- Elewon (2009) as Yomi
- Omo Ghetto (2010) as D.P.O
- Aye O (2016) as Faniyi
- Ọjọ ẹyẹ mi (My Joyous Day) (2016)
- Tenant of the House (2019) as Hon. Kasali
- Amerah (2021) as Alhaji
- Aníkúlápó (2022) as Alaafin Ademuyiwa
- Bank Alert (2023) as Grandpa
- IGE - the unlikely oil merchant (2023) as Olalere
- Anikulapo: Rise of the Spectre (2024) as Alaafin Ademuyiwa

== Awards and nominations ==
Year	Award	Category	Film	Result	Ref
2023	Africa Magic Viewers' Choice Awards	Best Supporting Actor	Anikulapo	Nominated	
