= Ayo Adesanya =

Nigerian actress

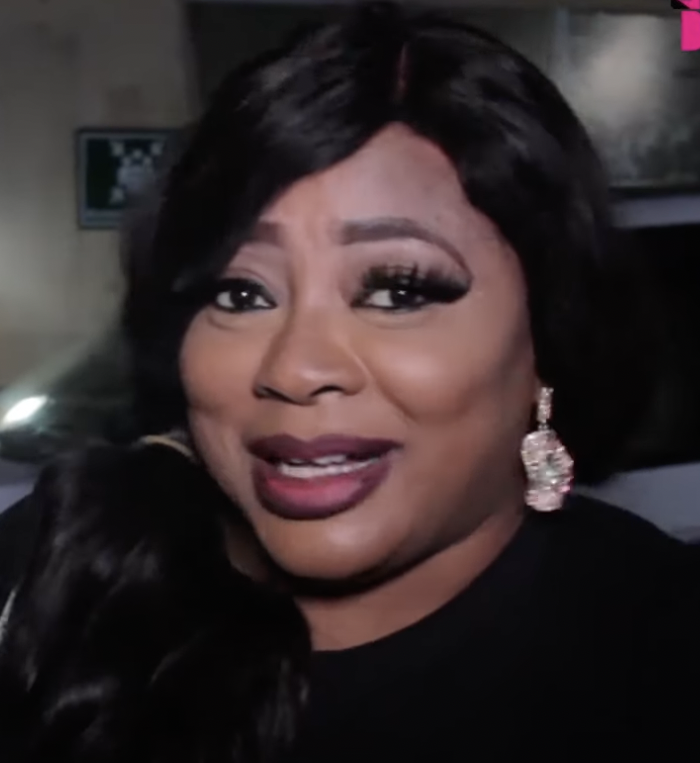
- Born: 11 August 1969 (age 57); Ogun State, Nigeria
- Citizenship: Nigerian
- Education: University of Ibadan
- Occupations: actress; producer; director
- Years active: 1986–present
- Spouse: Goriola Hassan

Ayo Adesanya (born 11 August 1969) is a Nigerian film actress, director and producer. Ayo Adesanya appears in both Yoruba and English-language films.

== Early life ==
Ayo Adesanya hails from Ijagun, Ijebu in Ogun State southwestern Nigeria. She attended St Anne's School in Ibadan, the capital of Oyo State, where she completed both her primary and secondary school education and obtained both her First School Leaving Certificate and West African Senior School Certificate. She later proceeded to the University of Ibadan where she obtained a bachelor's degree in Mass communication.

== Career ==
Ayo Adesanya began her career in 1986 after she completed the National Youth Service Scheme (NYSC) In 1992, she joined the Nigerian movie industry (Nollywood) professionally and began her professional acting career and made her first appearance in the movie Living in Bondage. Ayo Adesanya later joined the Yoruba-language film industry, where she has featured, produced and directed several films. She also appears in English-language films.

== Personal life ==
Ayo Adesanya was formerly married to Goriola Hassan but is now separated. She also has a son.

== Selected filmography ==
- Living in Bondage (1992) as Favour
- Living in Bondage 2 (1993) as Favour
- Silent Night (1996) as Extra
- Out of Bounds (1997) as Adaora
- Most Wanted (1998) as Backside
- Tokunboh (1999) as Mudy
- Remember Your Mother (2000) as Efe
- Time (2000) as Aghata
- Fire Dancer (2001) as Selena
- Contractors (2003)
- Dark Secret (2004)
- Crazy Passion (2005) as Pamela
- Tears in My Heart 2 (2006) as Dr. Rita
- Scarlet (2014)
- The Good Wife (2015) as Priscillia
- Dark Spotlight (2016) as Mrs. Adam
- Omugwo (2017) as Candance
- Finding Happiness (2018) as Kate
- Mokalik (2019) as Ireti
- Family Guest (2020) as Theresa
- A Christmas Gift (2020)
- Suga Suga (2021) as Ireti
- Just Us (2022) as Beatrice
- Love Unbroken (2023) as Diana
- Barrage (2023) as Mrs. Bamidele
- The Colour of Lies (2023)
- The Farewell Plan (2024)
- Trenches Kid (2024) as Williams' Mum
- Faithful Love (2024) as Diana
- Greener Pastures (2024) as Mama Efosa

== See also ==
- List of Nigerian film producers
- List of Yoruba people
