= The Virgin, the Copts and Me =

- Directed by: Namir Abdel Messeeh
- Written by: Namir Abdel Messeeh, Nathalie Najem, Anne Paschetta
- Screenplay by: Namir Abdel Messeeh, Nathalie Najem, Anne Paschetta
- Produced by: Centre National de la Cinématographie, Doha Film Institute, Maison de l'Image Basse-Normandie, Oweda Films
- Starring: Namir Abdel Messeeh, Siham Abdel Messeeh,
- Cinematography: Nicolas Duchêne
- Edited by: Sebastien De Sainte Croix, Isabelle Manquillet
- Music by: Vincent Segal
- Distributed by: Doc & Film International, Sophie Dulac Distribution (France)
- Release date: 2011
- Running time: 85 minutes
- Countries: Egypt; France; Qatar
- Languages: Arabic, French

The Virgin, the Copts and Me is a 2011 documentary film directed by Namir Abdel Messeeh.

It premiered at the Doha Tribeca Film Festival.

== Synopsis ==
Namir is Egyptian, a Copt, and now lives in France. When there is a family reunion, he buys an old video cassette recorded many years earlier at a religious holiday in his home village, when his mother said she had had a vision of the Blessed Virgin Mary. Namir realizes he has in his hands a very interesting subject for a documentary: he convinces his producer that it is a good idea and sets off on a journey that takes him back to his origins and puts his profession as a director to the test. However, he has not reckoned with his mother, the real protagonist of the story. Eventually, in her hometown, they recreate an apparition with the help of the other villagers.

== Critical reception ==
It was shown at the 2012 Tribeca Film Festival, the Festival Cinema Africano, the 2012 EBS International Documentary Festival, the 2012 Kraków Film Festival, the 2012 Cannes Film Festival, and at the 2013 Sydney Film Festival.

Variety drew a parallel between the Coptic minority in Egypt and the Egyptian minority in France, and they commended the editing. For Slant Magazine, the staged apparition brings the film to a "satisfying climax". The Huffington Post commended the director's decision to keep the footage filmed in 2010, prior to the Egyptian Revolution of 2011. For America, the "Coptic population" is "held together by a shared sense of self-abnegation and unwavering faith" and it is "faith that remains a rallying force for the Copts on the screen" despite their "victimized status as a religious minority".
