= Aníkúlápó =

2022 Nigerian film

- Directed by: Kunle Afolayan
- Screenplay by: Shola Dada
- Produced by: Kunle Afolayan Omo Omu-Aran
- Starring: Sola Sobowale; Hakeem Kae-Kazim; Kunle Remi; Bimbo Ademoye; Taiwo Hassan
- Production company: KAP Productions
- Distributed by: Netflix
- Release date: 30 September 2022
- Running time: 111 minutes
- Country: Nigeria
- Language: Yoruba

Aníkúlápó is a 2022 Nigerian epic fantasy film produced by Kunle Afolayan and distributed by Netflix. Released on 30 September 2022, it stars Kunle Remi, Bimbo Ademoye, Sola Sobowale, Hakeem Kae-Kazim and Taiwo Hassan. The film was shot in Oyo State and Afolayan has described the work as a "Game of Thrones recreated in Nigeria but with a better representation of our culture (Yoruba culture)".

== Synopsis ==
Aníkúlápó narrates the story of Saro who has recently arrived in Oyo as a stranger and a traditional textile weaver who uses the "aso-ofi" loom and technique. Saro has an illicit romance with Queen Arolake who has an unhappy marriage because she is hated by the King's wives and is also uninterested in the king, but it is her duty to lay with him. She is also young and uninterested in the older king's constant attention. His favoritism brings up rivalries with the other, older queens, who mistreat her. She and Saro fall in love. As they make plans to elope, word of their affair gets to the king, who sentences Saro to death. Based on the mythical Akala bird which wakes him from death, Saro, through the astute actions of Arolake, gains the power to resurrect the dead through a gourd stolen by Aroloke, and earns the name, Anikulapo (Aníkúlápó), which means the "one that holds death in his purse." As Saro becomes popular in their new village Ojumo, he sets amorous eyes on other women and betrays Arolake. His excessive pride is his hubris as he begins to make inordinate demands from the villagers before he can raise the dead. When Arolake hears that Saro has asked for the king's daughter before he can restore life to the king's heir, she undermines the source of his power and deserts him. Saro fails to resurrect the prince and discovers he no longer has the power to tame death.

== Cast ==
- Kunle Remi as Saro, the weaver
- Bimbo Ademoye as Queen Arolake, the youngest Oyo queen
- Hakeem Kae-Kazim as Oba Aderoju of Ojumo
- Sola Sobowale as Awarun, the businesswoman who runs a ceramics workshop / factory
- Taiwo Hassan as Alaafin Ademuyiwa
- Ropo Ewenla as Asohun Oba for Ojumo town
- Faithia Balogun as Ojumo Queen
- Kareem Adepoju as Ojumo Chief
- Eyiyemi Afolayan as Omowunmi, daughter of one of the Alaafin's Queens (this actress, the director's daughter, makes her feature film debut here).
- Adebowale Adedayo (Mr Macaroni) as Akanji, an Oyo citizen who gives Saro advice
- Oga Bello as Oyo Chief
- Moji Olayiwola
- Aisha Lawal as Olori Sukanmi
- Dele Odule
- Yinka Quadri as Ojumo Hunter
- Ariyike Owolagba as Omowon

== Production ==
Anikulapo, which is Kunle Afolayan's production in partnership with Netflix, was produced and shot by Jonathan Kovel at the recently launched KAP resort in a village in Oyo State, it was produced and shot on a 40 acres (16 ha) with all infrastructure and buildings all built from scratch to suit the production while also intending to make it a film village. The production also featured the filmmaker, Kunle Afolayan's daughter, Eyiyemi Afolayan, this has been described by BusinessDay as Afolayan "cementing family's legacy" since their dynasty has been known to be in the film industry from their first generation.

== Awards and nominations ==
Year	Award	Category	Recipient	Result	Ref
2023	Africa Magic Viewers' Choice Awards	Best Supporting Actress	Sola Sobowale	Nominated	
2023	Africa Magic Viewers' Choice Awards	Best Supporting Actor	Yinka Quadri	Nominated	
2023	Africa Magic Viewers' Choice Awards	Best Supporting Actor	Taiwo Hassan	Nominated	
2023	Africa Magic Viewers' Choice Awards	Best Actress	Bimbo Ademoye	Nominated	
2023	Africa Magic Viewers' Choice Awards	Best Indigenous Language – Yoruba	Kunle Afolayan	Won	
2023	Africa Magic Viewers' Choice Awards	Best Costume Designer	Toyin Ogundeji	Nominated	
2023	Africa Magic Viewers' Choice Awards	Best Lighting Designer	Lanre Omofaiye	Nominated	
2023	Africa Magic Viewers' Choice Awards	Best Picture Editor	Temitope Folarin	Nominated	
2023	Africa Magic Viewers' Choice Awards	Best Sound Editor	Anu Afolayan	Won	
2023	Africa Magic Viewers' Choice Awards	Best Sound Track	Kent Edunjobi	Won	
2023	Africa Magic Viewers' Choice Awards	Best Make Up	Hakeem Effects Onilogbo	Nominated	
2023	Africa Magic Viewers' Choice Awards	Best Writer	Sola Dada	Won	
2023	Africa Magic Viewers' Choice Awards	Best Cinematographer	Jonathan Kovel	Nominated	
2023	Africa Magic Viewers' Choice Awards	Best Movie West Africa	Kunle Afolayan	Nominated	
2023	Africa Magic Viewers' Choice Awards	Best Overall Movie, Africa	Kunle Afolayan	Won	
2023	Africa Magic Viewers' Choice Awards	Best Director	Kunle Afolayan	Nominated	
