= Swallow (2021 film) =

- Directed by: Kunle Afolayan
- Written by: Sefi Atta
- Based on: Swallow (novel by Seffi Atta)
- Starring: Deyemi Okanlawon; Niyola; Chioma Chukwuka Akpotha; Ijeoma Grace Agu
- Production company: Netflix
- Distributed by: Netflix
- Release date: 1 October 2021
- Running time: 128 minutes
- Country: Nigeria
- Languages: English, Yoruba, Pidgin

Swallow is a 2021 Nigerian film directed by Kunle Afolayan, written by Sefi Atta and starring Niyola, Deyemi Okanlawon, Chioma Chukwuka Akpotha and Ijeoma Grace Agu. It was released on 1 October 2021, by Netflix.

== Plot ==
Tolani Ajao and her friend Rose, who are also roommates and works in the same bank. Rose's Boss Mr. Lamidi Salako is a very promiscuous man who abuses his power to harass his secretary. No one can stand up to him as he has the personnel department in his grip. He fires Rose because she refuses to be continuously harassed by him, and specifically asks for Tolani as replacement.

As predicted by Rose, he harasses Tolani too, who files a complaint in response to his memo accusing her of insubordination. Her complaint is refused by Ignatius in Personnel for his fear of ruining Mr. Salako's image as a married man. Mr. Salako later suspends Tolani when she asks for a vacation, of which she is rightfully due.

Rose meets ‘OC’ an American returnee who introduces her to the world of drug trafficking. She tries to get a defeated Tolani to join her, and almost does when her boyfriend Sanwo is swindled of all her savings she borrowed him to start a business.

In the end, Rose travels alone to London after swallowing the drugs, but they burst in her stomach mid flight, killing her. Tolani moves back to the village, where Sanwo comes looking for her and tells her that her boss Mr. Salako was suspended by Personnel. He also tells her about his new job at a consulting firm and returns her money.

== Cast ==
- Niyola as Tolani Ajao
- Deyemi Okanlawon as Sanwo
- Chioma Chukwuka Akpotha as Mama Chidi
- Ijeoma Grace Agu as Rose Adamson
- Mercy Aigbe as Violet
- 2 Milly Star
- Omotunde Adebowale David as Franka
- Kelvin Ikeduba as O.C.
- Frank Donga
- Eniola Badmus as Mrs. Durojaiye
- Kunle Afolayan as Pastor Fred
- Joseph Jaiyeoba as Hakeem
- Kayode Olaiya as Ajao
- Anthony Edet as Johnny
- Joke Muyiwa as Arike
- Segun Remi as Mr. Lamidi Salako
- Oreofeoluwa Lawal as Ayo
- Eniola Akanni as young Tolani

== Production ==
The Screenplay for the novel's adaptation was co-written by Sefi-Atta, the author herself, a playwright, and Kunle Afolayan. Principal Photography took place in Ibadan, Oyo State.

== Reception ==
Afolayan received knocks for his use of singers in the lead role of his movies. A reviewer for Pulse Nigeria said "Afolayan has a good eye for art direction and is an all round impeccable producer. In 'Swallow', he brandishes his expertise with the portrayal of the fashion, language and events (sometimes monotonous) of the era that the film is set. The screenplay, on the other hand, barely does justice to the literary piece. Though supervised by Atta, 'Swallow' the film feels choppy, missing out on the juices that make the novel stand out." Grace Agu received praise from the reviewer for her role as Rose. A reviewer for Premium Times praised the set designers for their attention to detail and also praised the use of indigenous languages in the film. Grace Agu was also praised for her acting while Niyola was said to have struggled with the role. Concluding, the reviewer wrote "It is a good movie worth watching especially as a family. It is didactic and entertaining." rating the movie 6/10.

== See also ==
- List of Nigerian films of 2021
