= Aremu Afolayan =

Nigerian actor (born 1980)

- Born: 2 August 1980 (age 45); Ebute Metta, Lagos, Lagos State, Nigeria
- Occupations: Actor, Producer
- Spouse: Kafilat Quadri
- Children: Iyunade Afolayan
- Parent: Adeyemi Josiah Afolayan (father)
- Relatives: Moji Afolayan (sister); Gabriel Afolayan (brother); Kunle Afolayan (brother)

Aremu Afolayan (born 2 August 1980) is a Nigerian film actor and the brother of Kunle Afolayan, a fellow actor.

== Early life and career ==
Aremu Afolayan is of Igbomina-Yoruba descent, from Kwara State. He is one of the sons of the famous theatre and film director and producer Adeyemi Afolayan (Ade Love). He was known for his film titled Idamu akoto (2009).

== Personal life ==
Aremu Afolayan is married to Kafilat Olayinka Quadri. They have a daughter Iyunade Afolayan.

== Cast ==
- Kesari (2018)

== Awards and nominations ==
Year	Award	Category	Result	Ref
2021	Net Honours	Most Searched Actor	Nominated	

== See also ==
- List of Yoruba people
