= Citation (film) =

2020 Nigerian film

- Film poster
- Directed by: Kunle Afolayan
- Written by: Tunde Babalola
- Starring: Jimmy Jean-Louis; Temi Otedola; Bukunmi Oluwashina
- Production company: Golden Effects
- Distributed by: Netflix
- Release dates: October 31, 2020 (Lagos); November 6, 2020
- Running time: 151 minutes
- Country: Nigeria
- Languages: English; Wolof; French; Yoruba

Citation is a 2020 Nigerian drama film directed by Kunle Afolayan, written by Tunde Babalola and starring Jimmy Jean-Louis, Temi Otedola, Bukunmi Oluwashina, and Gabriel Afolayan.

== Synopsis ==
The film is about a university student (Moremi Oluwa) who speaks out after a university professor attempts to rape her, and the reaction of the university institution to the claims. The film is broadly based on true events.

== Cast ==
- Jimmy Jean-Louis as Prof. Lucien N'Dyare
- Temi Otedola as Moremi
- Bukunmi Oluwashina as Uzoamaka
- Adjetey Anang as Kwesi
- Joke Silva as Angela
- Ini Edo as Gloria
- Ibukun Awosika as herself
- Ropo Ewenla as Dr. Grillo
- Gbubemi Ejeye as Rachel
- Yomi Fash-Lanso as Lucien Legal Rep.
- Gabriel Afolayan as Koyejo
- Oyewole Olowomojuore as Prof. Osagye
- Sadiq Daba as Prof. Yahaya
- Samantha Okanlawon as Social Activist 1
- Casilda Okanlawon as Social Activist 2
- Neba as Dr. Sembene
- Toyin Bifarin Ogundeji as Dr. Mrs. Nwosu

== Reception ==
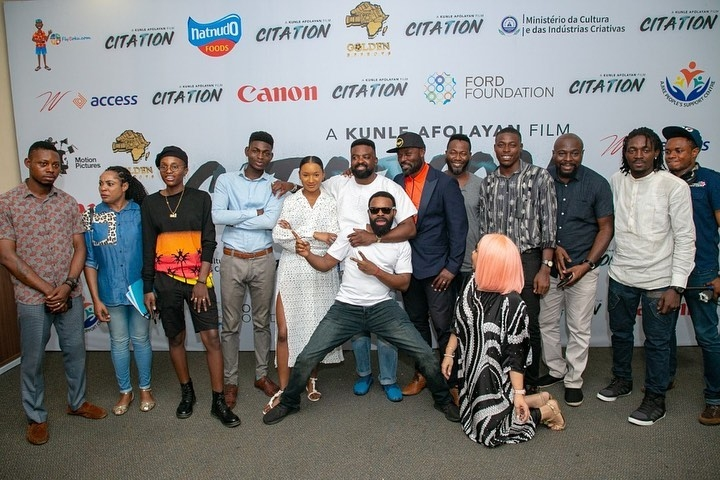
Citation Press Conference

According to the cast and crew, Citation rose to the sixth-most popular film on Netflix shortly after its release, and was most-watched on Netflix in Nigeria.

Digital Spy's Nelson C.J. wrote that the subject matter of Citation was important to discuss, and treated with an "objective and sufficiently informed" perspective within the film. C.J. praised the cinematography, but found that the dialogue could have been improved and the main character given more depth. Tambay Obenson of IndieWire praised the film as an "unflinching wakeup call that extends well beyond Nigeria's borders". The movie won the best international film awards at the national film awards.

== Awards and nominations ==
Year	Award	Category	Result	Ref
2021	Africa Movie Academy Awards	Best Actress in a Supporting Role	Nominated	
2021	Africa Movie Academy Awards	Best Nigerian Film	Nominated	
2021	Africa Movie Academy Awards	Best Soundtrack	Won	
2022	The National film Awards	Best international film	Won	
