= Gabriel Afolayan =

Nigerian actor and singer (born 1985)

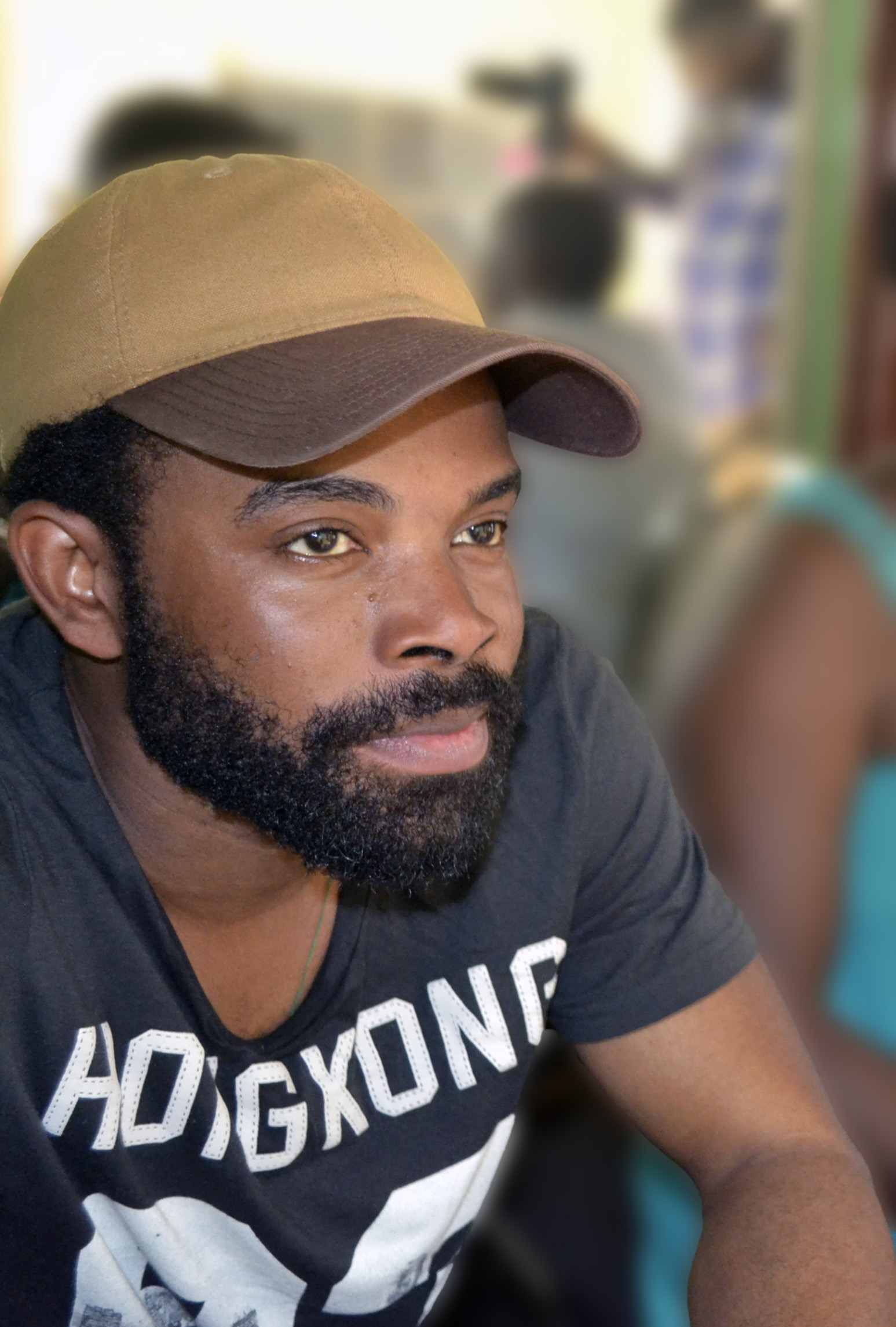
- Afolayan at the audition for Ojuju in 2013
- Born: 1 March 1985 (age 41)
- Citizenship: Nigerian
- Education: University of Ibadan
- Occupations: Actor, singer
- Years active: 1997 - present
- Parent: Adeyemi Afolayan (father)
- Relatives: Moji Afolayan (sister); Kunle Afolayan (brother); Aremu Afolayan (brother)
- Awards: Africa Movie Academy Award for Best Supporting Actor

Gabriel Afolayan, (born 1 March 1985) also known by his musical stage name G-Fresh, is a Nigerian actor and singer.

== Education ==
He studied theatre arts at the University of Ibadan in Oyo state, southwestern region of Nigeria.

== Career ==
He is part of the renowned Afolayan entertainment family that comprises Ade Love, Moji Afolayan, Kunle Afolayan and Aremu Afolayan. As an actor, he won the Best Supporting Actor award for playing "Tavier Jambari" in Hoodrush (2012). As a musician, he is known mostly for "Awelewa" and "Kokoro Ife". In an interview with The Punch, he described his musical genre as "Love ballad". Afolayan's acting debut was in F Opawon by Baba Sala. In an interview with Nigerian Tribune, he stated that his music career started in 1997, while he was part of a group in Ibadan. He also stated that he has always been part of the choir. He has cited 2face, Banky W., Aṣa and Bez as influences.

He rose to fame, playing the role “Akin” in a Super Story Series titled NNENNA.

== Personal life ==
Afolayan is the son of the Nigerian entertainment icon Adeyemi Afolayan popularly known as "Ade love".

== Filmography ==
=== Films ===
- Madam Dearest (2005)
- 7 Inch Curve (2015)
- Tomi's Got A Gun (2014)
- Ija Okan (2006)
- Hoodrush (2012) as Travier Jabari
- Heroes and Zeros (2012) as Dibu Ijele
- Ojuju (2014) as Romero
- Okafor's Law (2016) as Fox
- Tatu (2017) as Wally
- King Invincible (2017) as Prince Adetiba
- Coming from Insanity (2018) as Kossi
- Kasala (2018) as Fathia
- Code Wilo (2019) as Role
- Gold Statue (2019) as Wale
- Citation (film) (2020) as Koyejo
- For Maria Ebun Pataki (2020) as Afolabi
- Gone (2021) as Ayochukwu
- Hustle (2021) as Baba Gee
- Besties (2021) as Lenny
- Lugard (2021) as Little
- Mamba's Diamond (2021) as Elenu
- U-Turn (2022) as Chukwu
- Ijogbon (2023) as Brother Kasali
- A Lot Like Love (2023) as Mustapha
- Kannani (2023) as Gbovo
- This Is Lagos (2023) as Stevo
- Lisabi: The Uprising (2024) as Odunbamitefa
- Ambivalent (2024) as Role
- Landline (2025) as Kola

=== Television ===
- Anikulapo: Rise of the Spectre (2024) as Akin
- Seven Doors (2024) as Opayemi
- Blood Sisters (2022) as Femi Ademola
- Flawsome (2022)
- Taste of Love (2014-2015) as Duncan Rhodes
- Nnenna: A super story series (2003) as Akin

=== Discography ===
- "Kokoro Ife"
- "Plug it"
- "Kpasi Kona"
- "Awelewa"
- "Kokoro Ife"

== Awards ==
Year	Award	Category	Film	Result	Ref
2013	Africa Movie Academy Awards	Best Supporting Actor	Hoodrush	Won	
2013	Nollywood Movies Awards	Best Actor in a Supporting Role	Hoodrush	Nominated	
2013	Nollywood Movies Awards	Best Actor in a Leading Role	First Cause	Nominated	
2017	Best of Nollywood Awards	Best Actor in a Lead Role – English	Tatu	Nominated	
2017	Best of Nollywood Awards	Best Actor in a Lead role –Yoruba	False Flag	Nominated	
2017	Best of Nollywood Awards	Best Supporting Actor –Yoruba	Ailatunse	Won	
2017	Best of Nollywood Awards	Best Kiss in a Movie	Ailatunse	Won	
2019	Africa Magic Viewers' Choice Awards	Actor of the Year nominee	Coming From Insanity	Nominated	
2019	Intellects Awards	Best Actor (Male)		Nominated	
2019	Africa Movie Academy Awards (AMAA)	Best actor in a leading role	Gold Statue	Nominated	
2019	Best of Nollywood Awards	Best Actor in a Lead Role – English	Gold Statue	Won	
2019	International Film Festival (AIFF)	Outstanding Actor at the Abuja	Gold Statue	Won	
2020	Africa Magic Viewers' Choice Awards	Best Actor in a Drama (Movie or TV Series)	Coming From Insanity	Nominated	
2022	Africa Magic Viewers' Choice Awards	Best Actor in A Drama	For Maria Ebun Pataki	Nominated	
2025	Africa Magic Viewers' Choice Awards	Best Supporting Actor	Inside Life	Won	

== See also ==
- List of Yoruba people
