= Ijeoma Grace Agu =

Nigerian actress

- Born: Nigeria
- Education: Nnamdi Azikiwe University
- Occupation: Actress
- Children: 1
- Relatives: 5
- Awards: 2014 Best of Nollywood Awards :Most Promising Actress

Ijeoma Grace Agu is a Nigerian actress. She hails from the South-Eastern part of Nigeria and was born to Igbo Parents. She received a best supporting actress nomination at the 12th Africa Movie Academy Awards. She also won most promising actress at the 2014 Best of Nollywood Awards. In 2007, she made her first screen appearance in Eldorado TV series. She was also part of the cultural group at 2012 London Olympic Games.

== Early life and education ==
Agu is the first of her parents' five children. According to a report in Pulse Nigeria, she was raised in Benin City, the capital city of Edo State, south-south Nigeria and Lagos State, southwest Nigeria. She had her first degree in biochemistry from Nnamdi Azikiwe University in 2007.

== Personal life ==
She describes her dad as being responsible for instilling the confidence of acting into her. According to Agu, her acting career started on stage in Benin at the age of 14. Speaking to The Nation (Nigeria) on homosexuality in Nollywood, Agu describes the act as a sin on religious grounds and didn't think its outlaw was an infringement of human rights. However, she commented that they shouldn't be criminalized as its being done in Nigeria, and she would gladly accept the role of a lesbian in a film. She also asserts that she does not support anything that will result in the loss of lives of Nigerians, when asked about the agitation for Biafra and imprisonment of Nnamdi Kanu. She briefly dated and then married Daniel Oriahi. The marriage of 10 years produced a daughter but ended in a very bitter and public divorce with Ijeoma accusing him of infidelity. She went on to author a memoir about the divorce titled "You Can't Be Here, I Have A Girl In The Room".

== Filmography ==
- The Arrangement
- Beyond Blood
- One Room (2016) as Iyabo
- Aina (2011) as Sanaka
- Flower Girl (2013) as Chichi
- From Within
- Just Not Married (2016) as Hauwa
- Kpians: The Feast of Souls (2014) as Vivian
- Taxi Driver (2015) as Delia
- Hoodrush (2012)
- Misfits (2013) as Sade
- Blogger's Wife (2017) as Fred's Wife
- Love In A Time of Kekes (2018) as Raziella
- Women Are Scum (2018) as Ama
- Package Deal (2019) as Chiemela
- The Ghost and the House of Truth (2019) as Mrs Ayodeji
- Simple People (2020) as Omoge
- Sylvia (2018) as Hawa Bello
- 10 Songs for Charity (2021) as Charity
- False Doors (2021) as Enabo
- Untamed (2021) as Dera
- Hit and Run (2021) as Taiye
- Swallow (2021) as Rose Adamson
- Kofa (2022) as Nnenna
- The Femi-nist (2022) as Rolake
- When Perfect Feels Wrong (2022) as Timi
- Love in the Mix (2022) as Stella
- Nine (2023) as Hooded Assassin
- Detor: The Rise of A Warrior Hunter (2024)

== See also ==
- List of Igbo people
