= Moji Afolayan =

Nigerian actress (born 1968)

- Born: Moji; 5 February 1968 (age 58); Ibadan, Western State, Nigeria (now in Oyo State, Nigeria)
- Citizenship: Nigeria
- Occupations: actor; filmmaker; producer; director; dramatist
- Spouse: Rasaq Olayiwola
- Parent: Ade Love (father)
- Relatives: Kunle Afolayan (brother); Gabriel Afolayan (brother); Aremu Afolayan (brother)

Moji Afolayan (born February 5, 1968) is a Nigerian actress, filmmaker, producer and director.

== Early life ==
Afolayan hails from Agbamu, a town in the Irepodun Local Government Area of Kwara State in the north-central region of Nigeria but grew up in Lagos State, southwestern Nigeria. She was born in an acting family, the first daughter of the late veteran actor and producer Ade Love who is also the father of Kunle Afolayan and Gabriel Afolayan.

Afoloyan attended Coker Primary School at Orile Iganmu, a city in Lagos State south-western Nigeria before she proceeded to Esie Iludun Anglican School where she obtained the West Africa School certificate. She later attended Oyo State College of Education where she was trained as a school teacher.

== Film career ==
In 2016, Afolayan who has acted in several Nigerian movies starred opposite Ojopagogo and Dele Odule in the Yoruba film Arinjo. She has also acted in the movie Aníkúlápó.

== Personal life ==
She is married to Rasaq Olasunkanmi Olayiwola, a Nigerian actor popularly known by his stage name "Ojopagogo".

== Awards and nominations ==
Year	Award	Category	Result	Ref
2021	Net Honours	Most Searched Actress	Nominated	

== See also ==
- List of Yoruba people
- List of Nigerian film producers
