= Ọmụgwọ =

Traditional Igbo postpartum care

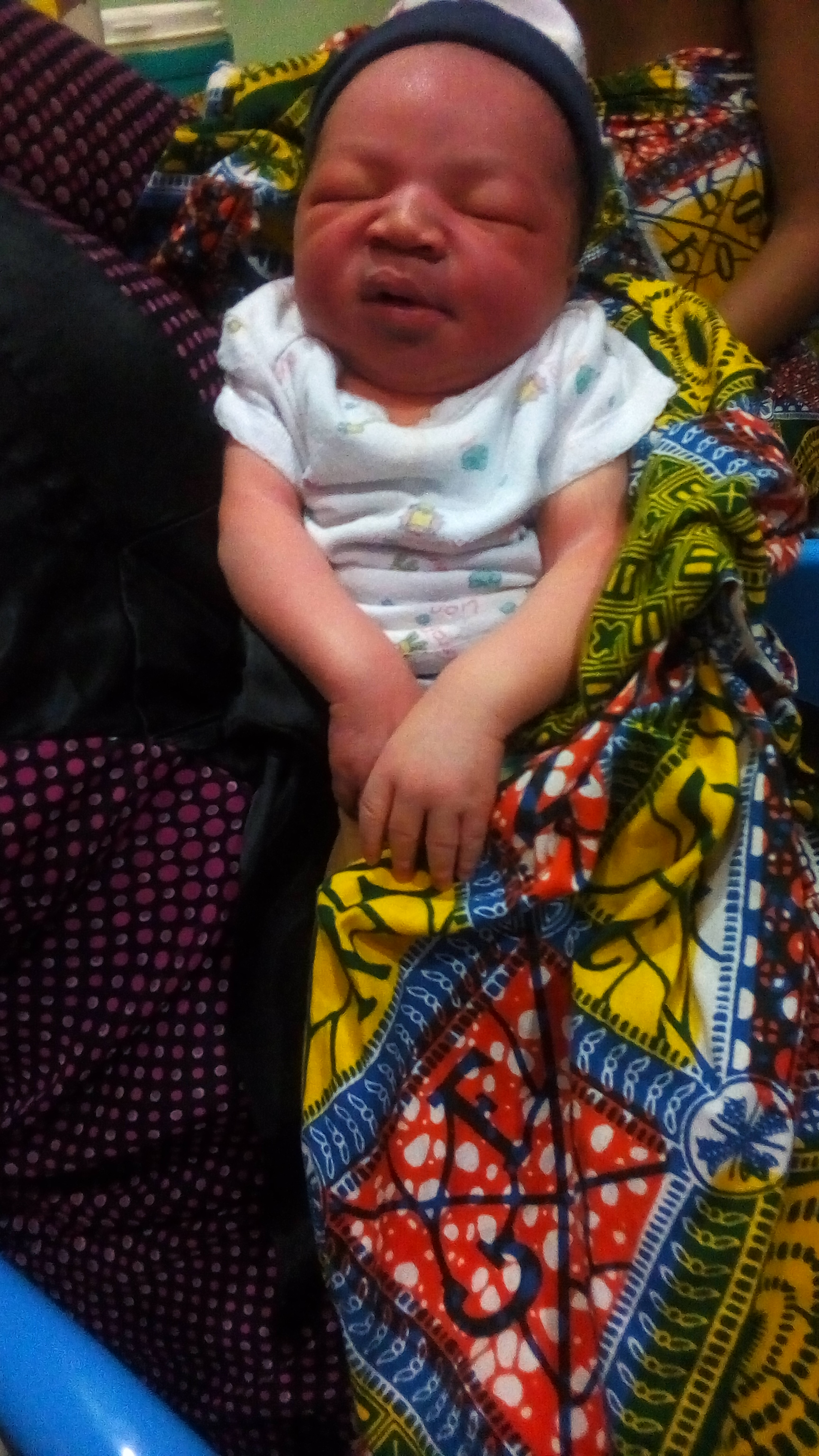
Newborn baby (Igbo tribe)

Ọmụgwọ (Igbo: [ɔ̀mʊgʷɔ̀]) is an Igbo practice in which a family member takes care of a new mother and her baby, in a short period of time after childbirth. Ọmụgwọ can be done during the first 40 days of a child's life or more. In most cases, it is the child's maternal grandmother or maternal step-grandmother that stays during the period of ọmụgwọ. In their absence, the paternal grandmother will replace the maternal grandmother or maternal grand step-mother.

The significance of this practice is that it helps the new mother learn the process of childcare through the experience of her mother or mother-in-law, who provides knowledge and support to her.

== Igbo tradition ==
Igbos are the originators of the tradition that is now practiced in many parts of Nigeria. This custom provides special care for new and nursing mothers. Postpartum care is encouraged in Igbo culture because it is important for a new mother to get enough rest so that she can regain her strength. Ọmụgwọ is one of the most important and ancient Igbo traditions.

== Process ==
In ọmụgwọ, often beginning after childbirth, it is the responsibility of the maternal grandmother to educate or guide the new mother on the type of food she eats to help with the production of breast milk, the new mother will also be massaged with hot water regularly.

After the baby is born, the grandmother will help the new mother to massage herself and her body. Hot water massage involves dipping a towel in hot water and using it to massage the new mother's stomach. Sitz Bath is also an important practice for a newborn's mother if she had a vaginal delivery and has a perineum tear. Sitting on hot water helps heal her internal organs properly. During this process, The mother or stepmother is involved in many household chores, caring for both the mother and the baby. The new mother will be given spicy foods such as pepper soup made with local spice to help remove unwanted blood clots from her body and help boost milk production. Akamu is also another feeding option for the mother as it helps to produce breast milk. Akamu is a local cereal made from grains like maize, sorghum, Guinea corn, etc.

The grandmother/representative of the newborn equally takes care of the baby, she

- Bathes and massages the baby 1-2 times a day. Massages are usually mild, full body massage with a warm towel.
- Feeding the baby espressed milk, formula, or watery pap (from six months).
- Washes the newborn's clothes, feeding bottles, etc
- Looks after the child, while the mother of the newborn recovers

At the end of ọmụgwọ, the grandmother is given gift to show appreciation from the new parents as she goes back to her own home. These gifts can be in the form of clothes, soap, food, money, and other material things.
