= Crescent University =

Private university in Ogun, Nigeria

- Crescent University, Abeokuta
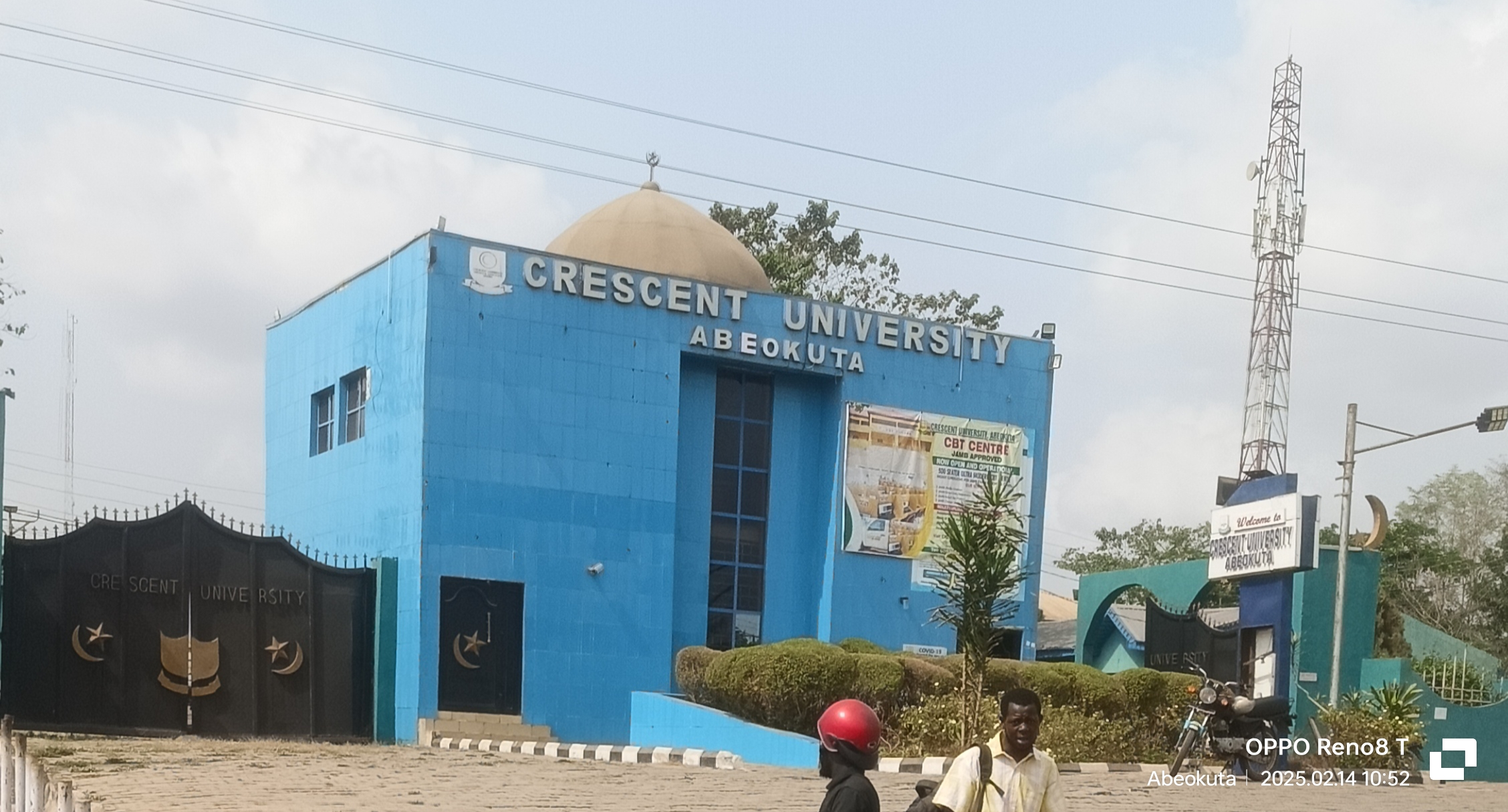
- Motto: Citadel of Academic and Moral Excellence
- Type: Private
- Established: 2005
- Vice-Chancellor: Professor Ibrahim Gbajabiamila
- Location: Abeokuta, Ogun State, Nigeria; 7.16146434°N 3.32125031°E
- Website: Official website
- Location within Nigeria

Crescent University is located in Abeokuta, Ogun State, Nigeria. It is a private university established by Nigerian Judge Bola Ajibola under the banner of the Islamic Mission for Africa. It has the following colleges: The Bola Ajibola College of Law, The College of Environmental Sciences, The College of Information and Communication Technology, The College of Natural and Applied Sciences, The College of Arts, Social and Management Sciences and The College of Health Sciences.

== History ==
In 2002, the Educational Board of the Islamic Mission for Africa (IMA) recommended the establishment of Crescent University, Abeokuta. The National Universities Commission approved the establishment of the University in 2005. The University commenced its academic program in December 2005.

== Library ==
The University Library is also known as Alhaja Seliat Adebutu Library which was named after the mother of a philanthropist Chief Kesington Adebutu who built and donated the library in remembrance of his mother.

The sections in the library include:

- Technical services
- Readers’ services
- Serials
- Reference
- E-Library.
