= Tunde Babalola =

Nigerian screenwriter

- Born: England
- Education: Obafemi Awolowo University
- Occupation: Screenwriter
- Years active: 1997–present

Tunde Babalola is a Nigerian screenwriter in Nigerian cinema and British television. He is most notable for writing movies such as Last Flight to Abuja, Critical Assignment, October 1 and Citation, as well as the Nigerian soap-opera Tinsel and UK series The Bill and In Exile. He also acted in the 2001 movie Deep Freeze, however it is not a career path he says he intends to pursue.

== Personal life ==
He was born and grew up in England. Later, he moved to Nigeria with his parents and siblings. His father was an accountant and his mother worked in the Central Bank. Under the guidance of his uncle, a Lieutenant-Colonel in the Nigerian Army, Babalola was forced to apply to the Nigerian Defence Academy (NDA). However, his mother did not give him permission. Therefore, he gained admission to study Dramatic Arts at the Obafemi Awolowo University.

== Career ==
At the age of 14, he wrote his first film script In The Raw. After he returned to the United Kingdom, he joined with Channel 4 and wrote the play for sitcom series called In Exile. He later worked with several channels: BBC, Carlton Television and Chrysalis Television.

Babalola started as a writer with the TV serial The Bill. After the serial received fan popularity, he wrote the three TV serials in 1997: True to Life Player, Crime of a Lesser Passion and Armed and Dangerous. In 1998, he wrote the serial One Man, Two Faces. Later in 2002, he made maiden cinema appearance as an actor with the horror film Deep Freeze. He played the role as a helicopter pilot.

In 2014, he wrote the script of critically acclaimed blockbuster 1 October, where he took four weeks to write the first draft of the film and three drafts only took about a week to complete. The script was initially submitted with the title Dust, mainly because the story is set in a very dusty town. Even though Afolayan didn't want to do big budget projects at the time, he knew he had no choice, as he wanted to interpret the writer's vision adequately because it is a "national film with a universal appeal". He expressed that he liked the story of 1 October because it is a period piece, which he had never done before and "it is also significant to the present state of Nigeria". As a result, he decided to explore the film by adding his own ideas to the subsequent drafts of the script.

In 2015, he joined as the writer and producer of the comedy TV production Rib Busters: Comedy Show. In 2015, Babalola won the awards for the Best Comedy Writer for the film The meeting and Best Drama Writer for the film 1 October at Africa Magic Viewers’ Choice Awards.

== Filmography ==
Year	Film	Role	Genre	Ref.
1997	The Bill	writer	TV series	
1997	True to Life Player	writer	TV series	
1997	Crime of a Lesser Passion	writer	TV series	
1997	Armed and Dangerous	writer	TV series	
1998	In Exile	writer	TV series	
1998	One Man, Two Faces	writer	TV series	
2002	Single Voices	writer	TV series	
2002	Deep Freeze	Actor: Shockley	Film	
2004	Critical Assignment	screenplay, writer	Film	
2008	Life in Slow Motion	writer	Short film	
2011	Maami	screenplay	Film	
2012	Last Flight to Abuja	story	Film	
2012	The Meeting	writer	Film	
2014	October 1	script writer	Film	
2016	The CEO	writer	Film	
2018	The Eve (2018 film)	writer	Film	
2019	Mokalik (Mechanic)	writer	Film	
2020	Citation	writer	Film	
2021	La Femme Anjola	writer	Film	
2024	Funmilayo Ransome-Kuti (2024)	writer	Film	.
