= 2013 Africa Magic Viewers' Choice Awards =

2013 film award ceremony

1st Africa Magic Viewers' Choice Awards
- Date: 9 March 2013
- Site: Exhibition Center, Eko Hotels and Suites, Lagos, Nigeria
- Hosted by: IK Osakioduwa; Vimbai Mutinhiri
- Organized by: MultiChoice; Africa Magic

Highlights
- Best Picture: Otelo Burning
- Most awards: Man on Ground / Otelo Burning (4)
- Most nominations: Otelo Burning (14)

The 1st Africa Magic Viewers Choice Awards ceremony was sponsored by Amstel Malta, and the awards were presented by MultiChoice. It took place on 9 March 2013 at the Exhibition Center, Eko Hotels and Suites in Lagos, Nigeria. The awards honour excellence in television, film, and digital content creation in the African entertainment industry. The awards ceremony was televised by DStv and GOtv. Vimbai Mutinhiri and IK Osakioduwa hosted the show.

Otelo Burning had 14 nominations, closely followed by The Mirror Boy with 11 and Man on Ground with 10. Otelo Burning won four awards, including Best Picture. Other notable winners included OC Ukeje, who won Best Actor in a Drama for his role in Two Brides and a Baby, and Jackie Appiah, who won Best Actress in a Drama for her performance in Perfect Picture. Afeez Oyetoro and Mercy Johnson were awarded Best Actor and Actress in a Comedy for House Apart and Dumebi the Dirty Girl, respectively. The awards ceremony also honoured Ivie Okujaye with the Trailblazer Award and Olu Jacobs with the Industry Merit Award.

== Background ==
On 20 September 2012, Africa Magic and MultiChoice announced their creation of the Africa Magic Viewers' Choice Awards during the special episode of the Africa Magic magazine show Jara. The awards recognised African films, actors and actresses, and consisted of 26 categories and two honours for different roles in acting, directing, scriptwriting, cinematography, editing, makeup, sound, lighting, and costuming.

Among the 26 categories, six depended on votes of the viewers while others were selected by the panel of judges led by Femi Odugbemi. Other members of the judging panel included Allison Triegaardt, Armand-Guy de Beer, Bongiwe Selane, Deborah Odutayo, Ebou Waggeh, Eileen Sandrock, Njoki Muhoho, Phad Mutumba, and Richard West.

== Ceremony ==
The awards ceremony was held on 9 March 2013 at the Exhibition Center, Eko Hotels and Suites, located in Lagos. The awards ceremony was broadcast on television by DStv and GOtv, and was hosted by Zimbabwean media personality Vimbai Mutinhiri and Big Brother Africa's presenter IK Osakioduwa.

Films were submitted by producers without fee. The submission ended on 31 October 2012 at 9pm CAT. The nominees were announced in early December 2012 during a special edition of M-Net's lifestyle TV program, 53 Extra. The highest nominated works included: Otelo Burning (14), The Mirror Boy (11), and Man on Ground (10). Other multiple nominated titles included Perfect Picture (8), Two Brides and a Baby (7), Maami (5), and Skeem (5). According to Nigerian newspaper Premium Times, the 110 nominees were chosen from 43 different film producers from Nigeria, Ghana, Cameroon, Tanzania, Kenya, Zambia, South Africa, and Uganda.

Sara Blecher's Otelo Burning won four awards including Best Picture, Best Art Director, Best Make-up Artist and Best Lighting Designer. Akin Omotoso's Man On Ground also won four awards, including Best Movie Director, Best Cinematographer (for Paul Michelson), Best Picture Editor (for Aryan Kaganof), and Best Sound Editor (for Michael Botha and Joel Assaizky); Obi Emelonye's The Mirror Boy won three awards, including Best Movie Drama, Best Writer Drama and Best Costume Designer (for Ngozi Obazi); South African director Tim Greene's Skeem won two awards: Best Movie Comedy and Best Writer Comedy. The organisers didn't name nominees for two categories: Best Documentary and Best Online Video; according to the organisers, the selection team preferred to present it as certificates of encouragement to all entrants. The awards ceremony was sponsored by Amstel Malta, and the awards were presented by MultiChoice.

== Winners and nominees ==
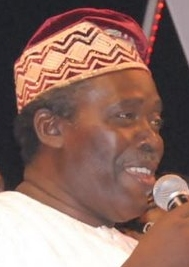
Olu Jacobs, Industry Merit Award winner

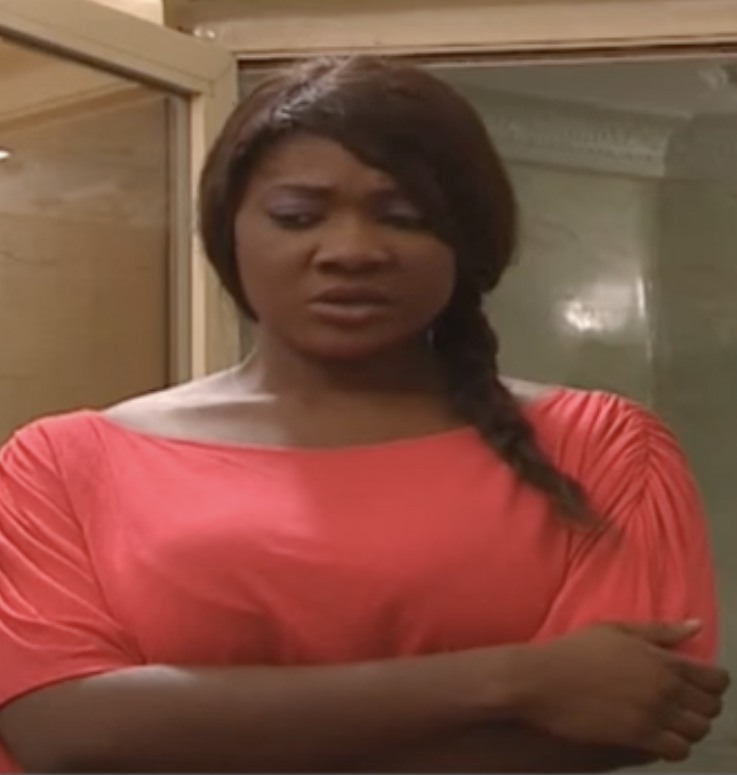
Mercy Johnson, Best Actress in a Comedy winner

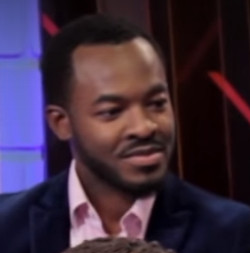
OC Ukeje, Best Actor in a Drama winner

Winners are listed first, highlighted in boldface and are indicated by ‡.

Table featuring winners and nominees of the 2013 AMCVA
**Best Actor in a Drama**: **OC Ukeje – Two Brides and a Baby** ‡; Fabian Adeoye Lojede – Jacob's Cross; Kenneth Uphopho – Down & Out; Edward Kagutuzi – The Mirror Boy; Jafta Mamabolo – Otelo Burning	**Best Actress in a Drama**: **Jackie Appiah – The Perfect Picture** ‡; Bubu Mazibuko – Man on Ground; Genevieve Nnaji – The Mirror Boy; Nolwazi Shange – Otelo Burning; Funke Akindele – Maami
**Best Actor in a Comedy**: **Afeez Oyetoro – House a Part** ‡; Kunle Bamtefa – Glorious Journey; Bovi – The Bovi Ugboma Show; Francis Odega–Clinic Matters; Ikhide Isaac – Wanna Be	**Best Actress in a Comedy**: **Mercy Johnson – Dumebi the Dirty Girl** ‡; Funke Akindele – The Return of Jenifa; Lilian Esoro – Clinic Matters
**Best Supporting Actor**: **Mathew Nabwiso – A Good Catholic Girl** ‡; Fabian Adeoye Lojede – Man on Ground; Osita Iheme – The Mirror Boy; Thomas Gumede – Otelo Burning; Kalu Ikeagwu – Two Brides and a Baby	**Best Supporting Actress**: **Maureen Koech – Lies that Bind** ‡; Thishiwe Ziqubu – Man on Ground; Harriet Manamela – Otelo Burning; Regina Chukwu – Akun; Taiwo Atigogo – Old Cargo Young Blood
**Best Writer (comedy)**: **Tim Greene – Skeem** ‡; Shirley Frimpong-Manso – Perfect Picture; Paul Igwe – Clinic Matters; Bovi – The Bovi Ugboma Show; Teru Ekuerhale – Wanna Be	**Best Writer (drama)**: **Obi Emelonye / Amaka Obi-Emelonye** – The Mirror Boy ‡; James Whyle / Sara Blecher / The Cast Workshop – Otelo Burning; Blessing Egbe – Two Brides and a Baby; Shirley Frimpong-Manso – A Sting in a Tale; Shirley Frimpong-Manso – Perfect Picture
**Best Sound Editor**: **Michael Botha / Joel Assaizky – Man on Ground** ‡; Juli vanden Berg / Tiago Correia-Paulo – Otelo Burning; Obi Emelonye – The Mirror Boy; Elorm Adablah – Perfect Picture; Elorm Adablah – A Sting in a Tale	**Best Lighting Designer**: **Dave Howe – Otelo Burning** ‡; Eleazu Texas – Two Brides and a Baby; Oluwole Olawoyin – Maami; Terry Emmanuel – Down and Out; Ken Attoh – Perfect Picture
**Best Art Director**: **Anita van Hemert / Chantel Carter – Otelo Burning** ‡; Bola Belo – Maami; Carol Mbugua – Lies that Bind; Bernard H. Mulenga – Kawanu; Blessing Effiom Egbe – Two Brides and a Baby	**Best Picture Director**: **Aryan Kaganof – Man on Ground** ‡; Megan Gilli – Otelo Burning; Shola Ayorinde – Two Brides and a Baby; Reg Chuhi / Kevin Ireri – Lies that Bind; Kayode Afolabi – Clinic Matters
**Best Movie**: **Otelo Burning** ‡; Skeem; Man on Ground; Jozi King; The Mirror Boy	**Best Overall Movie Director**: **Obi Emelonye – The Mirror Boy** ‡; Tim Greene – Skeem; Akin Omotoso – Man on Ground; Sara Blecher – Otelo Burning; Shirley Frimpong-Manso – Perfect Picture
**Best Movie (comedy)**: **Skeem** ‡; Wisdom of Thomas Collins; Phone Swap; The Return of Jenifa; Open Fire 2	**Best Movie (drama)**: **Man on Ground** ‡; The Mirror Boy; Otelo Burning; Adams Apple; A Sting in a Tale
**Best Local Language Movie (Yoruba)**: **Maami** ‡; Akun; Gbajumo	**Best Local Language Movie (Hausa)**: **Faida Nura** ‡; Asirka; Yunkuri
**Best Local Language Movie (Swahili)**: **The Ray of Hope** ‡; Sakalakata; Zenabu	**Best Television Series**: **The XYZ Show** ‡; Peep; Jozi Moving the City; DemiGods; Makutano Junction
**Best Cinematographer**: **Paul Michelson – Man on Ground** ‡; Clive Norman – The Mirror Boy; Tom Marais – Skeem; Lance Gewer – Otelo Burning; Sarafa Abagun – Maami	**Best Make-Up Artist**: **Jacqui Bannermen – Otelo Burning** ‡; Gabriel Okorie – The Mirror Boy; Biola Poopola – Tales of Eve; Jayne Awoonor-Williams – Perfect Picture; Christin Ngoma – Kawanu
**Best Costume Designer**: **Ngozi Obasi – The Mirror Boy** ‡; Frank Awoonor-Williams – Perfect Picture; Frank Osodi Richard – Two Brides and a Baby; Preston Mwila – Kawanu; Nkiru Nwauzor – Spider	**Best Picture Editor**: **Aryan Kaganof – Man on Ground** ‡; Meghan Gilli – Otelo Burning; Shola Ayorinde – Two Brides and a Baby; Reg Chuhi / Kevin Ireri – Lies that Bind; Kayode Afolabi – Clinic Matters
**Trailblazer Award**: **Ivie Okujaye** ‡	**Industry Merit Award**: **Olu Jacobs** ‡
