= AMVCA for Best Overall Movie =

Award presented at the AMVCA

The Africa Magic Viewers' Choice Award for Best Overall Film is an annual category presented by MultiChoice, celebrating the best African film for the preceding year.

Best Film
Year	Film	Director	Result
2013	Otelo Burning	Sara Blecher	Won
2013	Skeem	Timothy Greene	Nominated
2013	Man on Ground	Akin Omotoso	Nominated
2013	Jozi King	Jamie Ramsay	Nominated
2013	The Mirror Boy	Obi Emelonye	Nominated
2014	Contract	Shirley Frimpong-Manso	Won
2014	Last Flight to Abuja	Obi Emelonye	Nominated
2014	Apesin	Muyiwa Ademola	Nominated
2014	Living Funeral	Udoka Oyeka	Nominated
2014	Flower Girl	Michelle Bello	Nominated
2014	Awakening	James Omokwe	Nominated
2015	October 1	Kunle Afolayan	Won
2015	Invasion 1897	Lancelot Oduwa Imasuen	Nominated
2015	Yellow Cassava	Zeb Ejiro	Nominated
2015	A Place in the Stars	Steve Gukas	Nominated
2015	Iyore	Frank Rajah Arase	Nominated
2016	Dry	Stephanie Linus	Won
2016	Freetown	Adam Abel and Garrett Batty	Nominated
2016	Ayanda	Sara Blecher	Nominated
2016	Tell Me Sweet Something	Akin Omotoso	Nominated
2016	Road to Yesterday	Ishaya Bako	Nominated
2016	Silverain	Juliet Asante	Nominated
2016	House Arrest	Joseph Kenneth Ssebaggala	Nominated
2017	76	Izu Ojukwu	Won
2017	Happiness Is a Four-letter Word	Thabang Moleya	Nominated
2017	93 Days	Steve Gukas	Nominated
2017	Mrs Right Guy		Nominated
2017	Aisha		Nominated
2017	Naomba Niseme		Nominated
