= Africa Magic Viewers' Choice Awards =

Annual Nigerian television and film awards

- Current: 2026 Africa Magic Viewers' Choice Awards
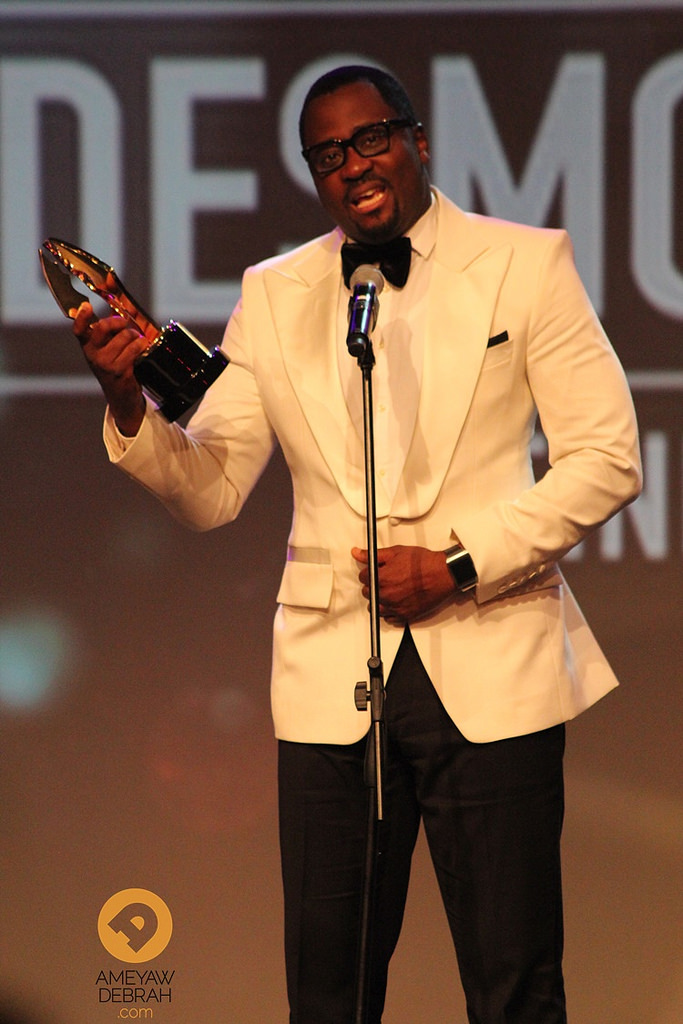
- Desmond Elliot at the 2014 Africa Magic Viewers Choice Awards
- Awarded for: Excellence in African television and film
- Country: Nigeria
- Presented by: MultiChoice
- First award: 2013
- Website: amvcaawards.dstv.com

Television/radio coverage
- Network: Africa Magic

The Africa Magic Viewers' Choice Awards (AMVCA) are a set of accolades presented by MultiChoice recognizing outstanding achievement in television and film across Africa, through an annual ceremony hosted in the Exhibition Center of the Eko Hotel and Suites in Lagos, Nigeria. The inaugural Africa Magic Viewers’ Choice Awards ceremony was held on 9 March 2013 and was broadcast live in more than 50 countries. Entries into the award ceremony are films and TV series that have been aired in the previous year. It has been described as "Africa's biggest night in film and fashion".

== Ceremonies ==
| Annual ceremony | Date of ceremony | Hosts | Best Overall film | | | Reference(s) |
| Annual ceremony | Date of ceremony | Hosts | Title | Director | Nation | Reference(s) |
|---|---|---|---|---|---|---|
| 1st | 9 March 2013 | IK and Vimbai | Otelo Burning | Sara Blecher | South Africa | |
| 2nd AMVCA | 8 March 2014 | Osas, IK and Vimbai | Contract | Shirley Frimpong-Manso | Ghana | |
| 3rd AMVCA | 7 March 2015 | IK and Vimbai | October 1 | Kunle Afolayan | Nigeria | |
| 4th AMVCA | 5 March 2016 | IK and Minnie Dlamini | Dry | Stephanie Linus | Nigeria | |
| 5th AMVCA | 4 March 2017 | IK and Minnie Dlamini | 76 | Izu Ojukwu | Nigeria | |
| 6th AMVCA | 1 September 2018 | IK and Minnie Dlamini | 18 Hours | Njue Kevin | Kenya | |
2019 ceremony not held
| 7th AMVCA | 14 March 2020 | IK and Amina Abdi Rabar | Living in Bondage: Breaking Free | Ramsey Nouah | Nigeria | |
2021 ceremony not held
| 8th AMVCA | 14 May 2022 | IK and Bonang Matheba | Amina | Izu Ojukwu | Nigeria | |
| 9th AMVCA | 20 May 2023 | IK and Zozibini Tunzi | Aníkúlápó | Kunle Afolayan | Nigeria | |
| 10th AMVCA | 11 May 2024 | IK | Breath of Life | BB Sasore | Nigeria | |
| 11th AMVCA | 10 May 2025 | IK | Freedom Way | Afolabi Olalekan | Nigeria | |
| 12th AMVCA | 09 May 2026 | Bovi & Nomzamo Mbatha | My Father’s Shadow | Funmbi Ogunbanwo & Rachel Dargavel | | |

== Categories ==
- Best Actor in a Drama
- Best Actress in a Drama
- Best Supporting actress in a drama
- Best supporting actor in a drama
- Best Actor in a comedy
- Best actress in a comedy
- Best Make-up artist
- Best Costume designer
- Best Lighting designer
- Best Sound Editor
- Best Art director
- Best Cinematographer
- Best Writer - Drama/Comedy
- Best Indigenous Language (Hausa)
- Best Indigenous Language (Igbo)
- Best Indigenous Language (Yoruba)
- Best Indigenous Language (Swahili)
- Best Documentary
- Best Short Film/Online video
- Best TV series - drama/comedy
- Best Movie (East Africa)
- Best Movie (Southern Africa)
- Best Movie (West Africa)
- Best Movie director
- Best Overall Movie
- Best Soundtrack - Movie/TV series
- Best TV series
- Trailblazer Award
- Industry Merit Award

== Statistics ==
=== Most nominations ===
==== By a film ====
10 and up

| Number of nominations | Film title | Year |
|---|---|---|
| 14 | Otelo Burning | 2013 Africa Magic Viewers Choice Awards |
| 14 | '76 | 2017 Africa Magic Viewers Choice Awards |
| 13 | 93 Days | 2017 Africa Magic Viewers Choice Awards |
| 13 | Oloibiri | 2017 Africa Magic Viewers Choice Awards |
| 12 | October 1 | 2015 Africa Magic Viewers Choice Awards |
| 11 | Living in Bondage: Breaking Free | 2020 Africa Magic Viewers Choice Awards |
| 11 | Tatu | 2018 Africa Magic Viewers Choice Awards |
| 11 | Mirror Boy | 2013 Africa Magic Viewers Choice Awards |
| 11 | A Place in the Stars | 2015 Africa Magic Viewers Choice Awards |
| 10 | Alter Ego | 2018 Africa Magic Viewers Choice Awards |

==== By an individual ====
| Male | | | Female | | |
| Number of nominations | Name | Notes | Number of nominations | Name | Notes |
|---|---|---|---|---|---|
| 12 | Stanlee Ohikhuare | Best Makeup (2015), Best Lighting Designer (2015), Best Art Director (2015), Best Cinematographer (2015), Best Movie Director (2015), Best Lighting Designer - Common Man (2016), Best Lighting Designer - Kpians: Feast of Soul (2016), Best Art Director (2016), Best Cinematographer (2016), Best Writer (2018), Best Sound Editor (2018), Best Art Director (2018). | 13 | Shirley Frimpong-Manso | Best Director (2013), Best Writer (drama) - Perfect Picture (2013), Best Writer (drama) - A Sting in a Tale (2013), Best Writer - comedy (2013), Best Video Editor (2014), Best Art Director - Contract (2014), Best Art Director - Adams Apple (2014), Best Writer in drama (2014), Best Director (2014), Best Writer in drama (2015), Best Director (2016), Best Picture Editor (2016) and Best Director (2018) |
| 7 | Obi Emelonye | Best Sound Editor (2013), Best Director (2013), Best Writer (2013), Best Video Editor (2014), Best Sound Editor (2014), Best Director (2014), Best Indigenous - Igbo (2015) | 5 | Funke Akindele | Best actress in a drama (2013), best actress in a comedy (2013), best actress in a comedy (2016), best actress in a comedy for Jenifa's Diaries (2017), best actress in a comedy for A Trip to Jamaica (2017) |
| 5 | Yinka Edward | Best Cinematographer (2015), Best Cinematographer - 93 Days (2017), Best Cinematographer - 76 (2017), Best Lighting Designer (2017) and Best Cinematographer (2018). | 5 | Rita Dominic | New era award (2014), best actress in a drama (2015), best actress in a comedy (2015), best actress in a drama (2017), best actress in a comedy (2018) |
| 5 | Blossom Chukwujekwu | Best Supporting Actor (2015), Best Supporting Actor (2016), Best Actor in a Drama (2016), Best Actor in a Comedy (2017), Best Actor in a Comedy (2018) | 4 | Ivie Okujaye | Trailblazer award (2013), best actress in a drama (2014), best actress in a drama (2017), best supporting actress (2017) |
| 5 | Frank Rajah Arase | Best Art Director (2014), Best Director (2014), Best Art Director (2015), Best Writer (2015) and Best Art Director (2016) | 3 | Nse Ikpe Etim | Best actress in a drama (2014), best actress in a comedy (2015), best actress in a drama (2016) |
| 4 | OC Ukeje | Best Actor in a Drama (2015), Best Supporting Actor (2015), Best Supporting Actor (2016) and Best Actor in a Comedy (2018) | 3 | Jackie Appiah | Best actress in a drama (2013), best actress in a comedy (2014), best actress in a comedy (2015) |
| 4 | Tunde Babalola | Best Writer - comedy (2015), Best Writer - drama (2015), Best Writer - The CEO (2017) and Best Writer - Ghana Must Go (2017). | 3 | Adesua Etomi | Best actress in a drama (2016), best actress in a drama (2017), best actress in a comedy (2018) |
| 3 | Wale Ojo | Best Actor in a Comedy (2015), Best supporting actor (2018), Best actor in a drama (2018) | 3 | Sara Blecher | Best director (2013), best writer (2013), best director (2016) |
| 3 | Adjetey Anang | Best Actor in a Drama (2015), Best actor in a drama - Keteke (2018), Best actor in a drama - Sidechick Gang (2018) | 3 | Lydia Forson | Best actress in a comedy (2015), Best writer (2015), Best supporting actress (2018) |
| 3 | Majid Michel | Best Actor in a Drama - Somewhere in Africa (2014), Best actor in a drama - House of Gold (2014), Best actor in a drama (2016) | 3 | Jumoke Odetola | Best indigenous Yoruba (2016), Best indigenous Yoruba (2017) and Best indigenous Yoruba (2018) |
| 3 | Osita Iheme | Best Supporting Actor (2013), Best actor in a comedy - The Hero (2014), Best actor in a comedy - The Fighter (2014) | 2 | Mercy Aigbe | Best indigenous - Yoruba (2014), Best indigenous - Yoruba (2016) |
| 3 | Segun Arinze | Best Supporting Actor (2015), Best actor in a drama (2016), Best Art director (2018) | 2 | Genevieve Nnaji | Best actress in a drama (2013), Best actress in a drama (2016) |
| 3 | Ayo Makun | New Era award (2015), Best Writer (2017), Best actor in a comedy (2017) | 2 | Mercy Johnson | Best actress in a comedy (2013), Best supporting actress (2015) |

=== Most wins ===
==== By a film ====
4 and up

| Number of awards | Film title | Year |
|---|---|---|
| 9 | October 1 | 2015 Africa Magic Viewers Choice Awards |
| 7 | Living in Bondage: Breaking Free | 2020 Africa Magic Viewers Choice Awards |
| 5 | '76 | 2017 Africa Magic Viewers Choice Awards |
| 5 | My Father's Shadow | 2026 Africa Magic Viewers Choice Awards |
| 4 | Otelo Burning | 2013 Africa Magic Viewers Choice Awards |
| 4 | Man on Ground | 2013 Africa Magic Viewers Choice Awards |
| 4 | Contract | 2014 Africa Magic Viewers Choice Awards |
| 4 | Nairobi Half Life | 2014 Africa Magic Viewers Choice Awards |
| 4 | The Meeting | 2015 Africa Magic Viewers Choice Awards |
