= 2014 Africa Magic Viewers' Choice Awards =

2014 film award ceremony

2nd Africa Magic Viewers' Choice Awards
- Date: 8 March 2014
- Site: Expo Hall, Eko Hotels and Suites, Lagos, Nigeria
- Hosted by: Vimbai Mutinhiri; Osas Ighodaro; IK Osakioduwa
- Organized by: MultiChoice

Highlights
- Best Picture: Contract
- Most awards: Nairobi Half Life (4)
- Most nominations: Contract (9)

The 2nd Africa Magic Viewers Choice Awards ceremony was sponsored by Amstel Malta, and the awards were presented by MultiChoice. It took place on 8 March 2014 at Expo Hall, Eko Hotels and Suites, in Lagos, Nigeria. The awards honour excellence in television, film, and digital content creation in the African entertainment industry. The ceremony was televised by DStv and GOtv and hosted by Vimbai Mutinhiri, Osas Ighodaro, and IK Osakioduwa.

Nairobi Half Life won four awards, and Contract won Best Overall Movie. Other notable winners included Tope Tedela, who won Best Actor in a Drama for his role in A Mile from Home, and Nse Ikpe Etim, who won Best Actress in a Drama for her performance in Journey to Self. Osita Iheme and Funke Akindele were awarded Best Actor and Actress in a Comedy for The Hero and The Return of Sheri Koko, respectively. Michelle Bello was honoured with Trailblazer Award, Rita Dominic with the newly-created New Era Award, and Pete Edochie with the Industry Merit Award.

== Background ==
The list of nominees was released on 18 December 2013 and consisted of 28 awards in 26 categories. The nominees were selected by a judging panel and the selection process was verified by the legal firm, Sizwe Ntsaluba Gobodo. They were announced by hosts Vimbai Mutinhiri, Lawrence Maleka, and IK Osakioduwa during a 90-minute edition of the roundup show, Star Gist at Landmark Village in Victoria Island, Lagos.

== Ceremony ==
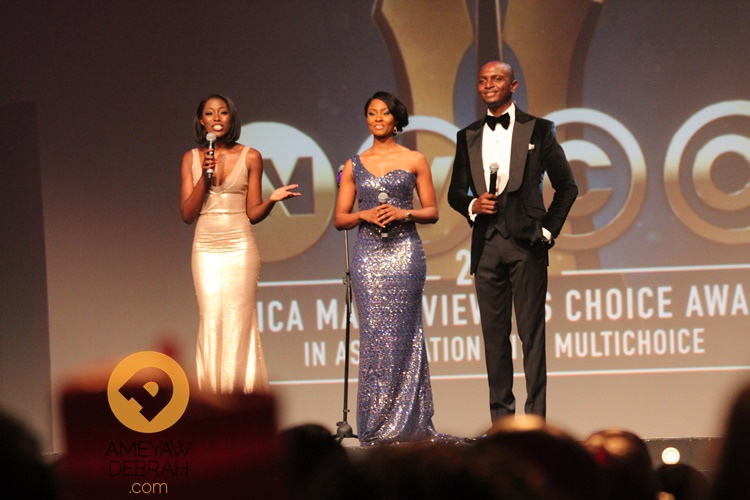
Mutinhiri, Ighodaro and Osakioduwa hosting the event

The awards ceremony was held on 8 March 2014 at Expo Hall, Eko Hotels and Suites, in Lagos. The ceremony was broadcast on television by DStv and GOtv and hosted by Osas Ighodaro alongside the previous ceremony hosts Vimbai Mutinhiri and IK Osakioduwa. There were live performances by Davido, Bez, Waje, and Cobhams Asuquo.

There are 137 nominations chosen from across 80 productions. The highest nominated work was Contract, with 9 nominations. It was followed by Living Funeral (8), Siri Ya Mtungi and Nairobi Half Life with 7 nominations, and Last Flight to Abuja (6). Kenyan David Tosh Gitonga's Nairobi Half Life won four awards, including Best Cinematographer, Best Art Director, Best Make-Up Artist, and Best Lighting Designer. Ghanaian film producer Shirley Frimpong-Manso won three awards. The awards ceremony was sponsored by Amstel Malta, and the awards were presented by MultiChoice. M-Net's Managing Director for Special Projects, Biola Alabi, presented the Best Overall Movie Award alongside NBC's Walter Drenth.

== Winners and nominees ==
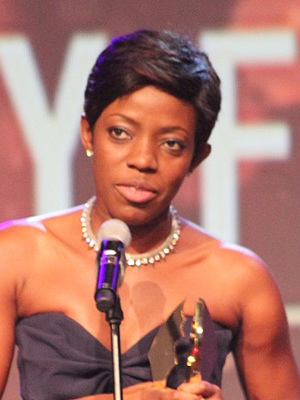
Shirley Frimpong-Manso, Best Overall Movie Director

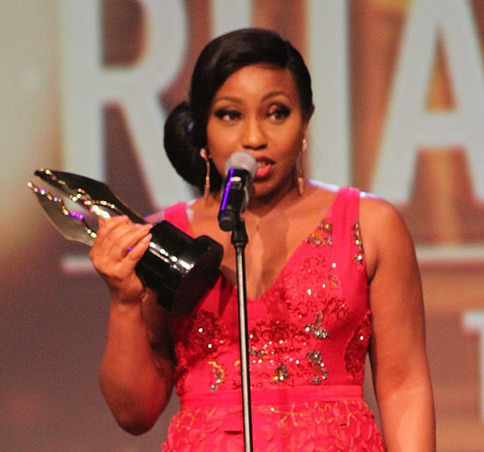
Rita Dominic, New Era Award winner

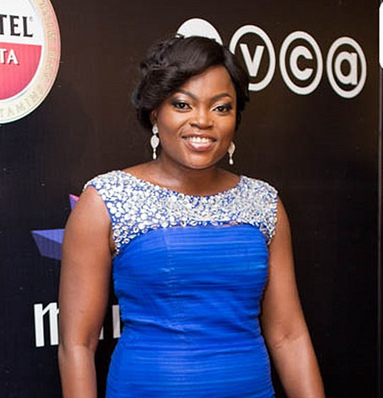
Funke Akindele, Best actress in a comedy

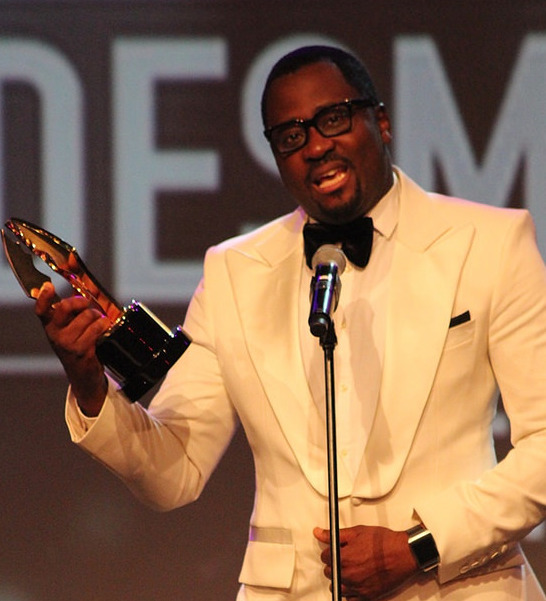
Desmond Elliot, Best Supporting actor

Winners are listed first, highlighted in boldface, and are indicated by ‡.

Table featuring winners and nominees of the 2014 AMVCA
**Best Actor in a Drama**: **Tope Tedela – A Mile from Home** ‡; Juma Rajab Rashid – Siri ya Mtungi; Majid Michel – Somewhere in Africa; Hlomla Dandala – Contract; Majid Michel – House of Gold	**Best Actress in a Drama**: **Nse Ikpe Etim – Journey to Self** ‡; Stephanie Wilson – Living Funeral; Veronica Waceke – Higher Learning; Nkiru Sylvanus – Kiss And The Brides; Ivie Okujaye – The Volunteers
**Best Actor in a Comedy**: **Osita Iheme – The Hero** ‡; Hlomla Dandala – Contract; John Okafor – Return of Sheri Koko; Osita Iheme – The Fighter; Chinedu Ikedieze – The Hero	**Best Actress in a Comedy**: **Funke Akindele – Return Of Sheri Koko** ‡; Funke Akindele – The Fighter; Funke Akindele – The Hero; Mary Ogbonna – Clinic Matters; Jackie Appiah – Cheaters; Yvonne Okoro – Contract
**Best Supporting Actor**: **Desmond Elliot – Finding Mercy** ‡; David Mulwa – Higher Learning; Ian Mbugua – House of Lungula; Bimbo Manuel – Torn; Chris Attoh – Flower Girl	**Best Supporting Actress**: **Bikiya Graham-Douglas – Flower Girl** ‡; Valerie Kimani – Higher Learning; Jazmyn Batchan – Still Standing; Liz Ameye – Living Funeral; Nancy Handabile – Love Games; Tamara Eteimo – Desperate House Girls
**Best Writer (comedy)**: **Jigi Bello – Flower Girl** ‡; Jahmal Holland – Still Standing; Ohis Udofia – Kuti's Career Palace; Patrick Onyeka – The Place; Seun Arowojolu – Squatterz	**Best Writer (drama)**: **Shirley Frimpong-Manso / Hertey Owusu – Contract** ‡; Patrick Yaadar / Andy Boyo – Off The Hook; Akpor Kagho – Living Funeral; Fatima Jabbe – Battered; Pascal Amanfo – Single and Married
**Best Sound Editor**: **Obi Emelonye / Luke Corradine – Last Flight to Abuja** ‡; Sola Awoponle – Ilari; Jordan Riber – Siri ya Mtungi; Carl Raccah – Journey to Self; Maurice Kings – Murder at Prime Suites; Paul Apel – Blue Flames	**Best Lighting Designer**: **Mohamed Zain – Nairobi Half Life** ‡; Don Izuchukwu Anozie – Brother's Keeper; Godwin Daniel – Living Funeral; Ifeoluwa Balogun – The Benjamins; Eric Aghimien – A Mile from Home
**Best Art Director**: **Barbara Minishi – Nairobi Half Life** ‡; Ken Attoh / Shirley Frimpong-Manso – Contract; Shirley Frimpong-Manso – Adams Apples Miniseries Part 1 & 2; Kyle Quint – Siri ya Mtungi; Frank Rajah Arase – The Price	**Best Overall Movie Director**: **Shirley Frimpong-Manso – Contract** ‡; Obi Emelonye – Last Flight to Abuja; David Tosh Gitonga – Nairobi Half Life; Udoka Oyeka – Living Funeral; Frank Rajah Arase – Price; Amil Shivji – Shoeshine
**Best Overall Movie**: **Contract** ‡; Living Funeral; Last Flight to Abuja; Flower Girl; Awakening	**Best Short Film**: **Walter Banger Taylaur – The Wages** ‡; Vincent Moloi – Berea; Amarachukwu Onoh – Mother Tongue; Amil Shivji – Shoeshine; Enuma Chigbo – The Deadwood
**Best Movie (comedy)**: **A Wish** ‡; Lies Men Tell; Contract; The Fighter; The Hero	**Best Movie (drama)**: **The Groom's Bride** ‡; Last Flight to Abuja; Nairobi Half Life; Living Funeral; Murder at Prime Suites
**Best Local Language Movie (Yoruba)**: **Komfo** ‡; Arinnakore; Edidi; Aye Kooto; Mufu Olosa Oloko	**Best Local Language Movie (Hausa)**: **Habib** ‡; Wani Gari; Bakin Kishi; Ruwan Jakara; Kurman Gari
**Best Local Language Movie (Swahili)**: **Mama Duka** ‡; Nairobi Half Life; Siri ya Mtungi; Nina; Vagabond	**Best Television Series**: **Love Games** ‡; Prem Episode; Siri ya Mtungi; The Benjamins; Nowhere To Be Found
**Best Cinematographer**: **Christian Almesberger – Nairobi Half Life** ‡; James Michael Costello – Last Flight to Abuja; Idhebor Kagho – Living Funeral; Imoh Umoren – Have A Nice Day; Themba Masondo – Taxi Ride	**Best Make-Up Artist**: **Elayne Okaya – Nairobi Half Life** ‡; Olabimpe Cole – Lekki Wives; Alex Gakumo – Sumu la Penzi; Michael Wawuyo – The Felistas Fable; Rehema Samo – Siri ya Mtungi; Israel Moses – A Wish; Rosemary Obika – Redemption
**Best Costume Designer**: **Chiemela Nwagboso – The Kingdom** ‡; Adeola Ramonu – Adebola Omo Oba; Doreen Estazia Noni – Siri ya Mtungi; Catherine Kibugi – Sumu la Penzi; Ruth Ndulu Maingi – Lies That Bind	**Best Video Editor**: **Shirley Frimpong-Manso – Contract** ‡; Ben Nugent / Obi Emelonye – Last Flight to Abuja; Austin Faani – Battle For Wealth; Chucks Madu Success – Oga On Top; Jack Esterhuizen – Love Games
**Best Documentary**: **The Deadwood** ‡; Tumanka Goes To School; Matatu: My Life, My Art; Guardians of the Wild; Shamba Shape Up	**Best New Media-Online video**: **Amarachukwu Onoh – Mother Tongue** ‡; Stacey Mc Dermott / Neville Ossai – Jungle Jewel: The Short Film; Mark Kaiyare – Deceit; Stanlee Ohikhuare – Kpians Premonition; Dorothy Ghettuba / Oyunga Pala – Next Big Host
**New Era Award**: **Rita Dominic** ‡
**Trailblazer Award**: **Michelle Bello** ‡	**Industry Merit Award**: **Pete Edochie** ‡
