= 2015 Africa Magic Viewers' Choice Awards =

2015 film award ceremony

3rd Africa Magic Viewers' Choice Awards
- Date: 7 March 2015
- Site: Eko Hotel Convention Centre, Eko Hotels and Suites, Lagos, Nigeria
- Hosted by: IK Osakioduwa; Vimbai Mutinhiri
- Organized by: Multichoice; Africa Magic

Highlights
- Best Picture: October 1
- Most awards: October 1 (9)
- Most nominations: October 1 (13)

The 3rd Africa Magic Viewers Choice Awards ceremony was sponsored by Almstel Malta, and the awards were presented by MultiChoice. It took place on 7 March 2015 at Eko Hotels and Suites in Lagos, Nigeria. The awards honour excellence in television, film, and digital content creation in the African entertainment industry. The awards ceremony was televised by DStv and hosted by IK Osakioduwa and Vimbai Mutinhiri.

October 1 had 13 nominations and won 9 categories. Other notable winners included OC Ukeje, who won Best Actor in a Drama for his role in Confusion Na Wa, and Kehinde Bankole, who won Best Actress in a Drama for her performance on October 1. The Meeting's Femi Jacobs and Rita Dominic were awarded Best Actor and Best Actress in a Comedy. The awards ceremony honoured C.J. Obasi with the Trailblazer Award, Ayo Makun with the New Era Award, and Amaka Igwe with the Industry Merit Award. A new category, the Best Indigenous Language Movie (Igbo) award, was introduced.

== Background ==
The awards nominees were announced on 10 December 2014 The nomination announcement ceremony was broadcast on all Africa Magic channels at 20:30 CAT of which viewer's voting commenced after and ended on 28 February 2015. It was hosted by Nick Mutuma and Sika Osei.

== Ceremony ==
The awards ceremony was held at the Eko Convention Centre, Eko Hotels and Suites in Lagos on 7 March 2015. It was broadcast on all stations of Africa Magic by DStv and was hosted by Vimbai Mutinhiri and IK Osakioduwa. The Marvin and Diamond Platnumz performed music while Basketmouth and Eddie Kadi performed theatrical comedy. Osas Ighodaro presented a spoken speech entitled "What if I am an African?".

Kunle Afolayan's October 1 had 13 nominations and 9 awards, including Best Movie Overall. OC Ukeje won Best Actor, while Kehinde Bankole won Best Actress, both in drama. Best Supporting Actor and Actress were awarded to Blossom Chukwujekwu and Linda Ejiofor, respectively. Rita Dominic and Mildred Okwo's The Meeting (2012) won Best Movie (Comedy), and one of its actors, Femi Jacobs, won Best Actor in Comedy, and Dominic won Best Actress in Comedy.

== Winners and nominees ==
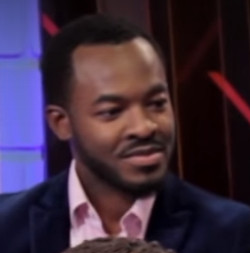
OC Ukeje, Best Actor in a Drama

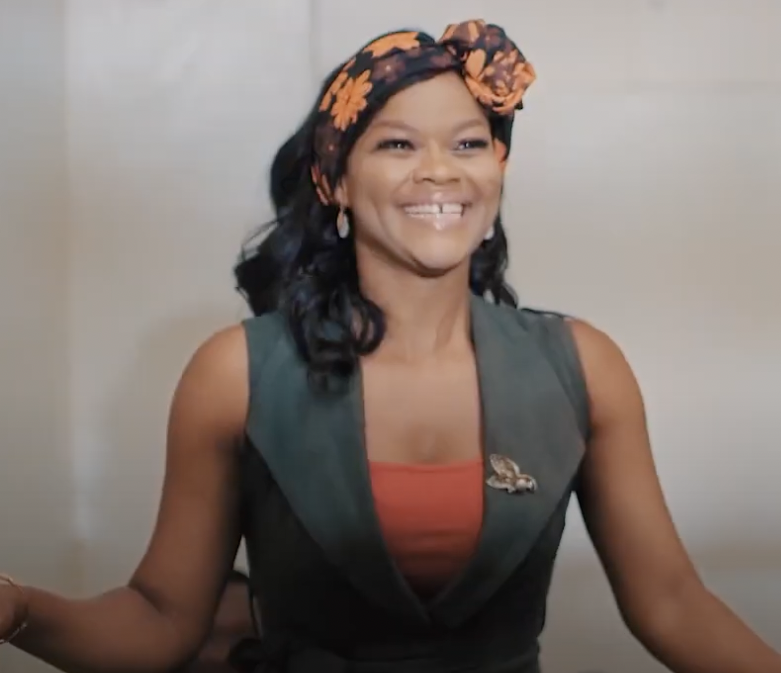
Kehinde Bankole, Best Actress in a Drama

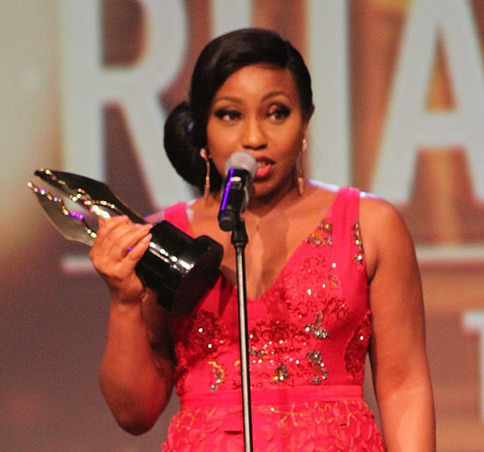
Rita Dominic, Best Actress in a Comedy

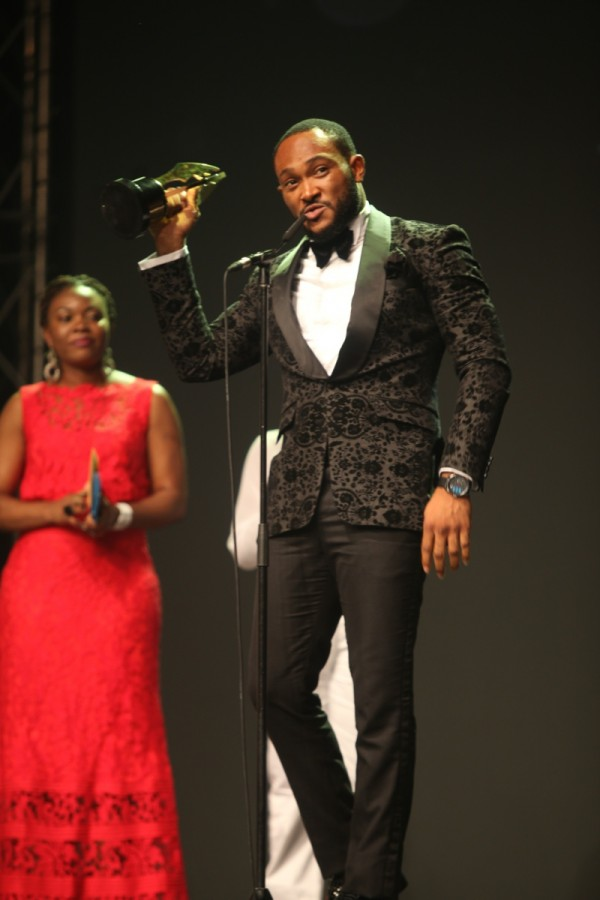
Blossom Chukwujekwu, Best Supporting Actor

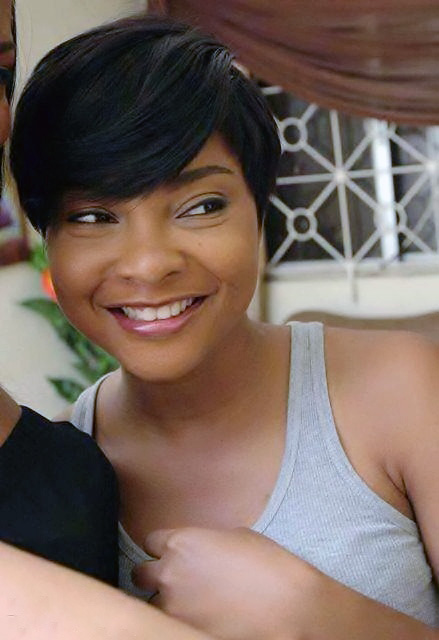
Linda Ejiofor, Best Supporting Actress

Winners are listed first, highlighted in boldface, and are indicated by ‡.

Table featuring winners and nominees of the 2015 AMVCA
**Best Actor in a Drama**: **OC Ukeje – Confusion Na Wa** ‡; OC Ukeje – Secret Room; Gideon Eche-Okeke – A Place in the Stars; IK Ogbonna – Honeymoon Hotel; Mike Ezuruonye – Unforgivable; Adjetey Anang – Devil in the Detail; Wole Ojo – Brave	**Best Actress in a Drama**: **Kehinde Bankole – October 1** ‡; Rita Dominic – Iyore; Amaka Mgbor – A Place in the Stars; Joselyn Dumas – Love or Something Like That; Aisha Kamara – Reflections
**Best Actor in a Comedy**: **Femi Jacobs – The Meeting** ‡; Kunle Idowu – The Interview; Wale Ojo – Meet the Adebanjos; Kelechi Udegbe – Horn Free Day; Gerald Langiri – Fundi-Mentals; Nonso Diobi – The Last 3 Digits	**Best Actress in a Comedy**: **Rita Dominic – The Meeting** ‡; Joke Silva – Folly; Weruche Opia – When Love Happens; Lydia Forson – Clinic Matters; Jackie Appiah – A Letter from Adam; Nse Ikpe Etim – I Come Lagos
**Best Supporting Actor**: **Blossom Chukwujekwu – Knocking on Heaven's Door** ‡; Segun Arinze – A Place in the Stars; Richard Mofe Damijo – 30 Days in Atlanta; Yemi Blaq – Iyore; OC Ukeje – When Love Happens	**Best Supporting Actress**: **Linda Ejiofor – The Meeting** ‡; Ada Ameh – 30 Days in Atlanta; Mercy Johnson – 30 Days in Atlanta; Ireti Doyle – Gidi Up; Tunde Aladese – Confusion Na Wa
**Best Movie (drama)**: **A Place in the Stars** ‡; Devil in the Detail; Invasion 1897; Secret Room; October 1; Make a Move	**Best Movie (comedy)**: **The Meeting** ‡; A Letter from Adam; The Meeting; 30 Days in Atlanta; Jand Hustle
**Best Make-up Artist**: **Lola Maja – October 1** ‡; Stanlee Ohikhuare – Verdict; Matthew Alechenu Hyacient (Iyore); Chinwen Elevoh/ Sandra Udoewah – A Place in the Stars; Juliette Okoli – The Meeting	**Best Costume Designer**: **Deola Sagoe/ Obijei Oru – October 1** ‡; Adebimpe Adebambo – Dazzling Mirage; Tiona Wangechi – Rush TV Series; Nana Akua Manso – Love or Something Like That; Ngozi Jombo – Under Your Skin
**Best Lighting Designer**: **Lanre Omofaiye – October 1** ‡; Dj Tee – The Antique; Stanlee Ohikhuare – Verdict; John Wambugu – Fundi-Mentals; Tajudeen Abdulazeez – Tales of Eve - Caged	**Best Video Editor**: **Victoria Akujobi – Reflections** ‡; Antonio Ribeiro – A Place in the Stars; Roselidah Taabu Obala – Veve; Mike Steve-Adeleye – October 1; Nana Akua Manso – Devil in the Detail
**Best Sound Editor**: **Kulanen Ikyo – October 1** ‡; Susan Penington – A Place in the Stars; Michael Ogunlade – Render To Caesar; Muhammed Atta / Jadesola Osiberu – Gidi Up; Kofi Boachie-Ansah – Love or Something Like That; Flo – The Antique	**Best Art Director**: **Pat Nebo – October 1** ‡; Crey Ahanonu / Simon Peacemaker – Secret Room; Ayako Bertolli – Veve; Stanlee Ohikhuare – Verdict; Frank Rajah Arase – Prince of Barmah
**Best Cinematographer**: **Stanlee Ohikhuare – Verdict** ‡; Yinka Edward – October 1; John Demps / Harald Beeker / Manuel Lapiere – A Place in the Stars; Dj Tee – The Antique; Lukman Abdulraman / Simon Peacemaker – Secret Room	**Best Writer (comedy)**: **Tunde Babalola – The Meeting** ‡; Adekunle Salawu – Clinic Matters; Zynnell Zuh / David Amah – When Love Comes Around; Seyi Babatope / Diche Enuwa / Temitope Bolade – When Love Happens; Lydia Forson – A Letter from Adam
**Best Writer (drama)**: **Tunde Babalola – October 1** ‡; Ita Hozaife & J.K. Amalou – A Place in the Stars; Shirley Frimpong-Manso – Devil in the Detail; Frank Rajah Arase – Iyore; Damijo Efe Young – Yellow Cassava	**Best Indigenous Language (Hausa)**: **Hafizu Bello & Abubakar Bashir Maishadda (Bincike)**; Abba Miko Yakassai (Maja); Andrew Ohio Ohiorenoya (Shagun Doka ); Uzee Concept (Mai Farin Jini); Abba Miko Yakassai (Ni Da Matata)
**Best Indigenous Language (Yoruba)**: **Fathia Balogun (Iya Alalake)**; Temitayo Adeniyi (Olosa); Oluwole Cole (Dagbere); Fidelis Duker (Dada Oni Paki); Alakada 2 (Alakada 2 )	**Best Indigenous Language (Igbo)**: **Obi Emelonye (Onye Ozi (The Messenger))**; Uche Nwa dili (B For Boy); Uzee Concept (Har Da Mijina); Onyekachukwu Okeke (Olanma); Collins Ezenwa (Saint Ossai)
**Best Indigenous Language (Swahili)**: **Sarika Hemi Lakhani (Veve)**; John Kallage (Network); Njoki Muhoho (Mama Duka); Almasi (Almasi); Timothy Conrad (Mdundiko)
**Best Documentary**: **The Gift of the Nile** ‡; These Past Times; Shashamane Southern Ethiopia; Paradox of Life; The Masai Mara Adventure	**Best Short Film**: **Oblivious** ‡; Verdict; Brave; The Throne
**Best Television Series**: **Shuga** ‡; The XYZ Show; Rush; Gidi Up; Maliposa	**Best Movie Director**: **Kunle Afolayan – October 1** ‡; Lancelot Oduwa Imasuen – Invasion 1897; Steve Gukas – A Place in the Stars; Eneaji Chris – Secret Room; Stanlee Ohikhuare – Verdict
**Best Movie**: **October 1** ‡; Invasion 1897; Yellow Cassava; A Place in the Stars; Iyore	**Best New Media-Online Video**: **Imoh Umoren – Hard Times** ‡; Stanlee Ohikhuare – Verdict; Marie Lora-Mungai – Ogas at the Top; Eric Aghimien – Leeway; Likarion Wainaina – Between the Lines
**Trailblazer Award**: **C.J. Obasi** ‡	**New Era Award**: **Ayo Makun** ‡
**Industry Merit Award**: **Amaka Igwe** ‡
