= 2025 Africa Magic Viewers' Choice Awards =

2025 film award in Nigeria

11th Africa Magic Viewers' Choice Awards
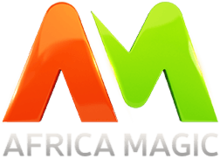
- The Logo of African Magic
- Date: 10 May 2025

Highlights
- Best Film: Freedom Way
- Best Actor: Femi Adebayo
- Best Actress: Chioma Chukwuka
- Lifetime achievement: Nkem Owoh & Sani Mu’azu

The 11th Africa Magic Viewers Choice Awards ceremony was sponsored by Amstel Malta and the awards were presented by MultiChoice. It took place on 10 May 2025 at the Exhibition Center, Eko Hotels and Suites in Lagos, Nigeria. The awards honour excellence in television, film, and digital content creation in the African entertainment industry. The awards ceremony was televised by DStv and GOtv. IK Osakioduwa hosted the show. Best Music Score category was introduced.

Lisabi: The Uprising won three awards: Best Indigenous Language Film (West Africa), Best Art Director and Best Makeup Artist. Femi Adebayo and Chioma Chukwuka won Best Actor and Best Actress both in a Drama, respectively for their roles in Seven Doors; Tolu Obanro also won the newly introduced Best Music Score for the film. Nkem Owoh and Sani Mu'azu were awarded the Lifetime Achievement Awards, while Kayode Kasum was honoured with the Trailblazer Award.

== Winners and nominees ==
Winners are listed first, highlighted in boldface and are indicated by ‡.

Table featuring winners and nominees of the 2025 AMCVA
**Best Actor in a Drama**: **Femi Adebayo – Seven Doors** ‡; Gideon Okeke – Tòkunbò; Bucci Franklin – The Weekend; Femi Branch – House of Ga'a; Thapelo Mokoena – Skeleton Coast; Bimbo Manuel – Princess on a Hill; Stan Nze – Suspicion; Adedimeji Lateef – Lisabi: The Uprising	**Best Actress in a Drama**: **Chioma Chukwuka – Seven Doors** ‡; Gbubemi Ejeye – Farmer's Bride; Uzoamaka Onuoha – Agemo; Uche Montana – Thinline; Uzoamaka Aniunoh – Phoenix Fury; Hilda Dokubo – The Uprising: Wives on Strike 3; Bimbo Ademoye – Anikulapo: Rise of the Spectre
**Best Supporting Actor**: **Gabriel Afolayan – Inside Life** ‡; Mr Macaroni – Lisabi: The Uprising; Aliu Gafar – Seven Doors; Femi Jacobs – Freedom Way; Richard Mofe-Damijo – Christmas In Lagos; Uzor Arukwe – Suspicion; Mike Afolarin – House of Ga'a; Efa Iwara – Princess on a Hill	**Best Supporting Actress**: **Mercy Aigbe – Farmer’s bride** ‡; Meg Otanwa – Inside Life; Tina Mba – Suspicion; Ireti Doyle – All's Fair in Love; Ini Dima-Okojie – Skeleton Coast; Omoni Oboli – The Uprising: Wives on Strike 3; Darasimi Nnadi – Aburo
**Best Movie**: **Freedom Way** ‡; Lisabi: The Uprising; Skeleton Coast; Suspicion; Inkabi; House of Ga'a; Christmas In Lagos; Farmer's Bride	**Best Indigenous Language (West Africa)**: **Lisabi: The Uprising** ‡; Seven Doors; Kaka; Anikulapo: The Rise of the Spectre; Mai Martaba
**Best Cinematography**: The Legend of The Vagabond (Queen Of Lagos) ‡; Agemo; Inkabi; Lisabi (The Uprising); Skeleton Coast; Soft Love; Yen Ara Asaase Ni	**AMVCA for Best Music/Score**: Seven Doors (Composer- Tolu Obanro) ‡; Freedom Way; Inkabi; Skeleton Coast; Soft Love
**Best Short Film**: **Brukaci** ‡; Sukari; The Incredible Sensational Fiancée of Seyi Ajayi; What Are You Truly Afraid Of?	**Best Documentary**: **Mai DùnDún** ‡; I Will Remember You; On Your Own; Walvis Tale
**Best Makeup**: **Lisabi (The Uprising)** ‡; Aníkúlápó (The Rise of the Scepter); Inside Life; Farmer’s Bride; Seven Doors; Suspicion	**Best Digital Content Creator**: **Iyo Prosper Adokiye** ‡; Maryam Apakagi-Greene; Elozonam Ogbolu / Hoviare Freedom / Chiamaka Uzokwe; Jide Pounds Ibitoye; Ariyiikedimples / Brain Jotter
**Best Unscripted M-Net Original**: Nigerian Idol (Season 9) Kassim Suleiman ‡; Husband Material; Overall Best; Pastor Wants a Wife	**Best Scripted M-Net Original**: **My Fairytale Wedding** ‡; Uriri; All Mine; Italo; The Caller; Kam U Stay
**Best Editing**: **Inkabi** (for Tongai Furusa) ‡; Christmas in Lagos (for Martini Akande); Skeleton Coast (for Jordan Koen); Soft Love (for Holmes Awa, Paballo Modingoane); Lisabi: The Uprising (for Anthill Studios); Princess on a Hill (for Laughter Ephraim, Peter Ugbede)	**Best Costume Design**: **Christmas in Lagos** ‡; Aníkúlápó; House of Ga'a; Lisabi
**Trailblazer Award**: Kayode Kasum ‡	**Industry Merit Award**: Nkem Owoh / Sani Mu'azu ‡
