= AMVCA for Best Actress in a Drama =

Award presented annually by Multichoice

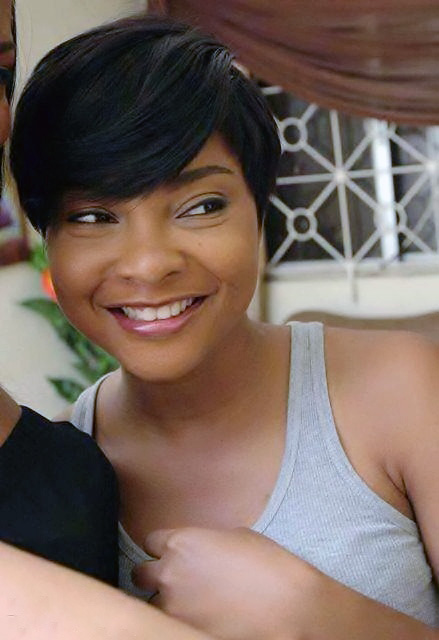
- The 2026 recipient: Linda Ejiofor
- Awarded for: Best Performance by an Actress in a Leading Role in Drama
- Country: Nigeria
- Presented by: Multichoice
- First award: March 9, 2013; 13 years ago
- Most recent winner: Linda Ejiofor, The Serpent's Gift (2026)

Highlights
- Most awards: Kehinde Bankole; Osas Ighodaro; (2)
- Website: dstv.com

The Africa Magic Viewers' Choice Award for Best Actress in a Drama is an award presented annually by Multichoice. It has been awarded since the 1st Africa Magic Viewers' Choice Awards to an actress who has delivered an outstanding performance in a leading role in an African drama film.

The first Africa Magic Viewers' Choice Award ceremony was held in 2013 with Jackie Appiah receiving the award for The Perfect Picture (2009). In 2015, Bankole received the honour again for her performance in October 1. As of 2024, Kehinde Bankole and Osas Ighodaro are the most honoured actresses with two awards each. The recent winner is Linda Ejiofor for The Serpent's Gift (2025).

== Winners ==
- The award ceremony was not held in 2019 and 2021.

Year	Image	Recipient(s)	Film(s)	Ref.
2013		Jackie Appiah	The Perfect Picture	
2014		Nse Ikpe-Etim	Journey to Self	
2015		Kehinde Bankole	October 1	
2016		Adesua Etomi	Falling	
2017		Rita Dominic	'76	
2018		Omotola Jalade Ekeinde	Alter Ego	
2020		Toyin Abraham	Elevator Baby	
2022		Osas Ighodaro	Rattlesnake: The Ahanna Story	
2023		Osas Ighodaro	Man of God	
2024		Kehinde Bankole	Adire	
2025		Chioma Chukwuka	Seven Doors	
2026		Linda Ejiofor	The Serpent's Gift	
