= AMVCA for Best Actor in a Comedy =

Award presented annually by Multichoice

- Awarded for: Best Performance by an Actor in a Leading Role in Comedy
- Country: Nigeria
- Presented by: Multichoice
- First award: March 9, 2013; 13 years ago
- Most recent winner: Broda Shaggi, Inside Life (2023 (Note: The Best Actor in a Comedy category was not included as a standalone award in 2024 and 2025))

Highlights
- Most awards: Broda Shaggi (2)
- Website: dstv.com

The Africa Magic Viewers' Choice Award for Best Actor in a Comedy is an award presented annually by Multichoice. It has been awarded since the 1st Africa Magic Viewers' Choice Awards to an actor who has delivered an outstanding performance in a leading role in an African comedy film.

The first Africa Magic Viewers' Choice Award ceremony was held in 2013 with Hafiz Oyetoro receiving the award for House a Part (2011). As of 2025, Broda Shaggi is the most honoured actor with two awards. The recent winner is Broda Shaggi for Inside Life (2023).

== Winners ==
- The award ceremony was not held in 2019 and 2021.

Year	Image	Recipient(s)	Film(s)	Ref.
2013		Hafiz Oyetoro	House a Part	
2014		Osita Iheme	The Hero	
2015		Femi Jacobs	The Meeting	
2016		Falz	Jenifa's Diary	
2017		Ime Bishop Umoh	The Boss is Mine	
2018		Odunlade Adekola	A Million Baby	
2020		Funny Bone	Smash	
2022		Broda Shaggi	Dwindle	
2023		Broda Shaggi	Inside Life	
