= AMVCA for Best Actor in a Drama =

Award presented annually by Multichoice

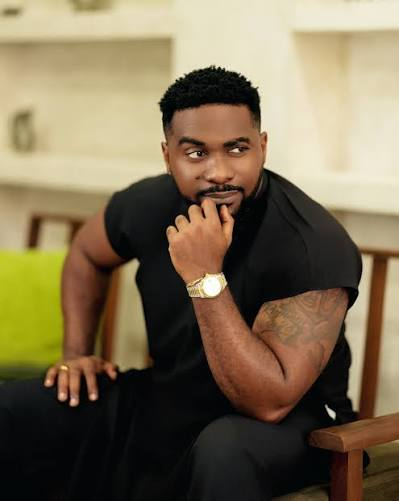
- The 2026 recipient: Uzor Arukwe
- Awarded for: Best Performance by an Actor in a Leading Role in Drama
- Country: Nigeria
- Presented by: Multichoice
- First award: March 9, 2013; 13 years ago
- Most recent winner: Uzor Arukwe, Colours of Fire (2026)

Highlights
- Most awards: OC Ukeje (2)
- Website: dstv.com

The Africa Magic Viewers' Choice Award for Best Actor in a Drama is an award presented annually by Multichoice. It has been awarded since the 1st Africa Magic Viewers' Choice Awards to an actor who has delivered an outstanding performance in a leading role in an African drama film.

The first Africa Magic Viewers' Choice Award ceremony was held in 2013 with OC Ukeje receiving the award for Two Brides and a Baby (2011). In 2015, Ukeje received the honour again for his performance in Confusion Na Wa. As of 2024, OC Ukeje is the most honoured actor with two awards. David Ezekiel is the youngest recipient at age 24 for Blood Vessel to be nominated. The recent winner is Uzor Arukwe for Colours of Fire (2026).

== Winners ==
- The award ceremony was not held in 2019 and 2021.

Year	Image	Recipient(s)	Film(s)	Ref.
2013		OC Ukeje	Two Brides and a Baby	
2014		Tope Tedela	A Mile from Home	
2015		OC Ukeje	Confusion Na Wa	
2016		Daniel K. Daniel	A Soldier's Story	
2017		Sambasa Nzeribe	Slow Country	
2018		Adjetey Anang	Keteke	
2020		Timini Egbuson	Elevator Baby	
2022		Stan Nze	Rattlesnake: The Ahanna Story	
2023		Chidi Mokeme	Shanty Town	
2024		Wale Ojo	Breath of Life	
2025		Femi Adebayo	Seven Doors	
2026		Uzor Arukwe	Colours of Fire	
