= Nancy Handabile =

Zambian actress, journalist and filmmaker

- Occupations: Actress, journalist, filmmaker
- Awards: Ankazi Woman of the Year Award from Stanbic Bank, 2019

Nancy Handabile is a Zambian actress, journalist and filmmaker. Handabile played the character Progress in Love Games, winning her a nomination for Best Supporting Actress in the 2014 Africa Magic Viewers Choice Awards. She directed Tizibika, a mock reality TV show about two women trying to use social media to achieve fame. She also co-directed and starred in the Zambezi Magic TV show Masauso. In 2019, she acted in the Zimbabwean movie Lord of Kush.

In December 2018, Handabile was recognized as among the top eight Multi Choice female filmmakers in the Southern African Development Community (SADC). She used the occasion to call for more women to break into traditionally male fields, and for filmmaking to receive more financial support in Zambia. In May 2019 she received an Ankazi Woman of the Year Award from Stanbic Bank.
