= AMVCA Trailblazer Award =

African film award

The AMVCA Trailblazer Award is a special award given by MultiChoice to an actor through Africa Magic for outstanding achievement the previous year.

== Awards ==
=== List of Awardees ===
==== 2013 Africa Magic Viewers Choice Awards ====
- Ivie Okujaye

==== 2014 Africa Magic Viewers Choice Awards ====
- Michelle Bello

==== 2015 Africa Magic Viewers Choice Awards ====
- C.J. Obasi

==== 2016 Africa Magic Viewers Choice Awards ====
- Kemi Lala Akindoju

==== 2017 Africa Magic Viewers Choice Awards ====
- Somkele Iyamah

==== 2018 Africa Magic Viewers Choice Awards ====
- Bisola Aiyeola
