= Boy Called Twist =

2004 film by Timothy Greene

- Film poster
- Directed by: Tim Greene
- Written by: Charles Dickens (novel); Tim Greene
- Based on: Oliver Twist by Charles Dickens
- Produced by: Aurelia Driver; Clare van Zyl; Steven Markovitz
- Starring: Jarrid Geduld
- Cinematography: Mike Downie
- Edited by: Ronelle Loots
- Music by: Murray C. Anderson
- Release date: 2004
- Running time: 115 minutes
- Country: South Africa
- Language: English

Boy Called Twist, is a 2004 film that tells the story of a Cape Town street kid, based on Charles Dickens’ classic 1838 novel Oliver Twist. It was the first film directed by Timothy Greene. Fundraising for the film involved small donations from a thousand investors, leading to the longest Associate Producers listing in the history of cinema.

== Plot ==
Twist's mother dies in childbirth in the middle of nowhere. Fearing blame, the locals bury her in an unmarked grave and drop the baby off at a rural orphanage, where he is named Twist.

Growing up in the dusty wastes of the Swartland, sold from orphanage into child labour on the farms, and later to a rural undertaker, Twist finally takes his fate into his own hands and escapes to Cape Town. Wide eyed at the wonders of the city, he falls in with Fagin - an ancient Ethiopian Rastafarian who runs a network of child thieves. His new friend Dodger teaches him the tricks of the trade, but the inexperienced Twist is caught trying to steal from Ebrahim Bassedien.

Although neither understand it, there is a strange affinity between this old man - who has lost his daughter - and the young boy who never knew his mother. Bassedien takes the little stroller in and for a moment it seems that the trauma is over - as the little boy encounters love for the first time in his short and brutal life.

Enter Monks - the only person who knows Twist's true identity. He is paying Fagin to keep the little boy marginalised. If he ends up in jail or dead on the street, so much the better, for Monks stands to lose his inheritance if anybody ever discovers that Twist is Bassedien's grandson.

The brutal gangster Bill Sykes, and his prostitute girlfriend, Nancy, steal Twist back for Fagin, and the struggle for a little boy's soul begins in earnest.

Release

18 November 2004.

Cast

Jarrid Geduld as Twist

Bart Fouche as Bill Sikes

Lesley Fong as Fagan

Kim Engelbrecht as Nancy
