= Paul Igwe =

Nigerian film director (born 1977)

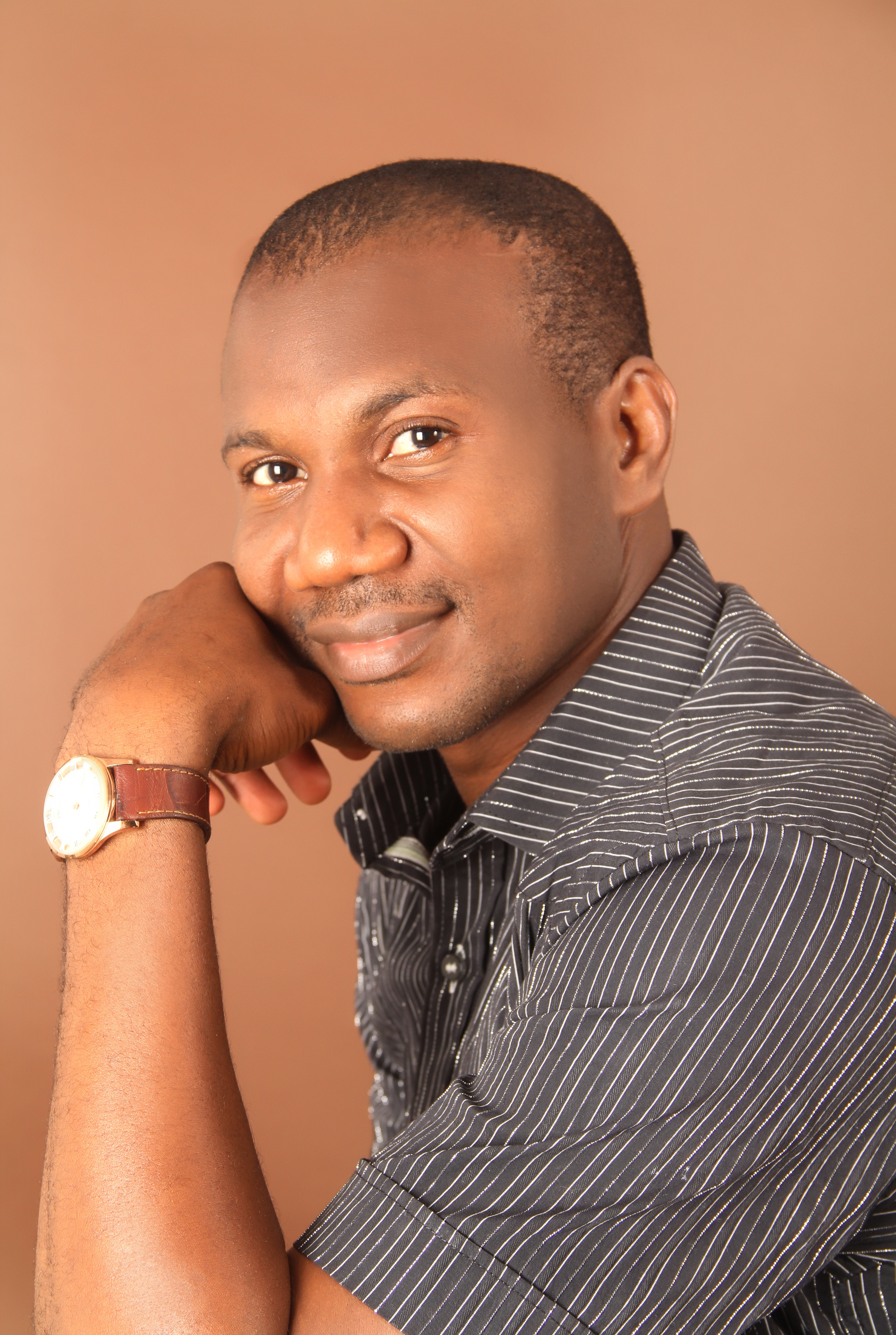
- Born: 27 November 1977 (age 48); Lagos, Nigeria
- Occupation: Filmmaker
- Years active: 1998–present
- Website: whitestonetv.com

Paul Igwe (born 27 November 1977) is a Nigerian television director, writer, producer, and creator, and CEO of Whitestone Cinema Limited. He produced popular Soap (TV series) like "Clinic Matters", "The Benjamins", "Ojays", and "Asunder".

== Career ==
In 2000, Paul Igwe started his own production company, Whitestone Cinema Limited and has directed over 20 movies and 8 television series. He debuted in 2000 as a director with the movie "Outrageous" and in 2007; he was a key force in the 39 episodes TV drama series, "Extended Family", working as director/consulting producer. He started his own television sitcom "Clinic Matters" in 2009, a series that won several awards and nominations locally and internationally including the prestigious 2012 World Quality Commitment Award in Paris.

In February 2012, he produced his second television series "The Benjamins" which was nominated at the 2014 Africa Magic Viewers' Choice Awards for Best Television series Comedy/Drama.

In 2015, he started a new family sitcom "Ojays" which was nominated for the Best Comedy award in the Nafca Awards. Paul also started a culinary show in Igbo called "USEKWU IGBO" which means 'Igbo Kitchen'. The show won the Best Indigenous Movie/TV Series award at the 2016 Africa Magic Viewers' Choice Awards held at the Eko Hotel and Suites, Victoria Island, Lagos.

In 2016, Paul started another family sitcom called "House 6" followed by another family sitcom "Troubled Cottage". Paul Igwe also launched his analytical drama series, "Asunder", later in the year, which focuses on the marital lives of different families.

In 2017, he produced another Igbo soap opera "Nkewa" showing on Africa Magic Igbo. He also directed "Dance To My Beat", a movie starring Joseph Benjamin, Kehinde Bankole, Toyin Abraham, and Mary Remmy Njoku.

== Filmography ==
| Year | Film | Note |
|---|---|---|
| 2000 | Outrageous | |
| 2007 | Extended Family | |
| 2009 | Clinic Matters | TV Series |
| 2012 | The Benjamins | TV Series |
| 2015 | OJAYS | Nominated for the Best Comedy award in the Nafca Awards |
| 2015 | PULSE | |
| 2015 | USEKWU IGBO | |
| 2016 | House 6 | |
| 2016 | Ulo Isii | Producer/Director/Writer |
| 2016 | Troubled Cottage | |
| 2016 | Asunder | Producer/Director |
| 2017 | Nkewa | Soap Opera |
| 2017 | Dance To My Beat | starring Joseph Benjamin, Kehinde Bankole, Toyin Abraham, |

== See also ==
- List of Nigerian film producers
- Shiloh Godson
