= List of Nigerian films of 2011 =

This is a list of Nigerian films released in 2011.

== Films ==
Title	Director	Cast	Genre	Notes
Ibu in Campus 1-4	Charles Inojie	John Okafor Charles Inojie Okey Bakassi Cynthia Okereke		Shot in English Language and Pidgin Released on VCD by Great Star
Nkwocha	Stan Amadi	Chiwetalu Agu; Queen Nwaokoye; Uche Elendu Walter		This film received four Nollywood Movie Awards nominations, including Best Movie, Best Actress in a Leading Role, Best Actor and Best Male Actor in a Supporting Role.
The Mirror Boy	Obi Emelonye	Genevieve Nnaji Osita Iheme Edward Kagutuzi Fatima Jabbe	Drama / fantasy / adventure	
Two Brides and a Baby	Teco Benson	OC Ukeje Stella Damasus-Aboderin Kalu Ikeagwu Chelsea Eze	Romantic drama	
I'll Take My Chances	Desmond Elliot	Ini Edo Bryan Okwara Sam Loco Efe Jide Kosoko	Dance / romantic drama	5 nominations at 2012 Golden Icons Academy Movie Awards

== See also ==
- List of Nigerian films
