= Bubu Mazibuko =

South African actress

- Occupation: Actress
- Notable work: Catch a Fire
- Spouse: Langa Masina

Bubu Mazibuko is a South African actress. She portrayed Betsy in the 2006 film Catch a Fire. She also portrayed Thuli in the television series Gaz'lam (2002-2005), for which she was nominated for a Duku Duku Award for Best Female Actor in a Drama. For her performance as Lindiwe in the film Man on Ground (2011), Mazibuko was nominated for the Africa Magic Viewers' Choice Award for Best Actress in a Drama.

She has been married to Langa Masina since 2016.

== Select filmography ==
- Catch a Fire (2006) as Betsy
- Gangster's Paradise: Jerusalema (2008) as Older Nomsa
- A Small Town Called Descent (2010) as Daphne Mbizo
- Man on Ground (2011) as Lindiwe
- Mandela: Long Walk to Freedom (2013) as Madela and Tambo's client
- Necktie Youth (2015) as Jabz's Mother
- For Love and Broken Bones (2016) as Busi
- Zulu Wedding (2017) as Sam
- No Vows, No cows (2024) as Patty
