= Living Funeral (film) =

- Directed by: Udoka Oyeka
- Written by: Akpor Kagho
- Produced by: Orode Ryan-Okpu
- Starring: Liz Benson-Ameye, Norbert Young and Stephanie Wilson.
- Cinematography: Idhebor Kagho
- Release date: 2013
- Country: Nigeria
- Language: English

Living Funeral is a 2013 is a Nigerian Nollywood movie produced by Mrs Orode Ryan-Okpu and directed by Udoka Oyeka under the sponsorship of Pink Pearl Foundation. The movie that sensitises the public on early discovery of breast cancer stars Liz Benson-Ameye, Norbert Young and Stephanie Wilson.

== Synopsis ==
The movie tells the ordeal of a young woman who had to face the reality of battling with a breast cancer. It also portrays how cordial relationship with the victim of any terminal diseases can help to boost their physical and psychological morale.

== Premiere ==
The movie was premiered in Lagos in October 2013 and later in Asaba, Delta State in December 2013.

== Award and nominations ==
The movie was nominated for eight Africa Magic Viewers’ Choice Awards (AMVCAs) in 2013. The categories are;

- Best Movie 2013 (Orode Ryan-Okpu and Udoka Oyeka);
- Best Movie-Drama (Orode Ryan-Okpu and Udoka Oyeka);
- Best Movie Director (Udoka Oyeka);
- Best Actress in a Drama (Stephanie Wilson);
- Best Supporting Actress in a Drama (Liz Ameye).
- Best Writer-Drama (Akpor Kagho);
- Best Cinematographer (Idhebor Kagho); and
- Best Lighting Designer (Godwin Daniel).
