= AMVCA Industry Merit Award =

The AMVCA Industry Merit Award is an honorary award presented by MultiChoice through Africa Magic for lifetime contribution to the development of African cinema.

== Awards ==
=== List of Awardees ===
==== 2013 Africa Magic Viewers Choice Awards ====
- Olu Jacobs

==== 2014 Africa Magic Viewers Choice Awards ====
- Pete Edochie

==== 2015 Africa Magic Viewers Choice Awards ====
- Amaka Igwe

==== 2016 Africa Magic Viewers Choice Awards ====
- Bukky Ajayi
- Sadiq Daba

==== 2017 Africa Magic Viewers Choice Awards ====
- Chika Okpala
