= Skeem =

- Film poster
- Directed by: Tim Greene
- Written by: Tim Greene
- Produced by: Tim Greene
- Starring: Wandile Molebatsi Kurt Schoonraad Lilani Prinston
- Release date: 2011
- Running time: 111 Minutes
- Country: South Africa
- Language: English
- Budget: R 1.2 Million
- Box office: $71, 505

Skeem is a 2011 South African movie that was written and directed by Tim Greene. It premiered on 16 October 2011 at the Abu Dhabi Film Festival, where it won the Audience's Choice Award, and opened to local theaters in South Africa later that same month.

Of the film, Greene has stated that he wanted to create a film that South Africans could watch that they could be proud of and "doesn't beat them up, lash them and make them feel like watching South African films is like penance". The title track for the film, "Oons behoort mos saam", was sung by Jack Parow and EJ von Lyrik.

== Synopsis ==
The film centers on two friends who discover a cardboard cash filled with a million dollars after their car breaks down. They decide to stay at a nearby resort, where the staff and other guests quickly discover that the pair has a large amount of money, causing everyone to create plans to steal the cash.

== Cast ==
- Wandile Molebatsi as Vista
- Kurt Schoonraad as Richie Rich
- Lilani Prinsen as Jana
- Grant Swanby as Drikus
- Michelle Scott as Lizette
- Kenneth Nkosi as Lucas
- Rapulana Seiphemo as Nyoka

== John & John ==
In 2017 Ghanaian journalists reached out to Greene to check the claim by Ghanaian film maker Kofi Asamoah that he had received permission to adapt the movie. His 2017 film John & John was a wholesale, unauthorized remake of Skeem, and no such permission had been granted. No legal action was taken, as Greene's lawyers informed him that the cost of pursuing an intellectual property case against Asamoah in time and money would not make it worthwhile. Asamoah claimed in public that he had received permission to adapt the movie. although in private he agreed to purchase the remake rights, but never followed through.

== Reception ==
The Mail & Guardian reviewed the film alongside another South African film releasing around the same time, Khalo Matabane’s A State of Violence, stating that the two portray very different portrayals of the country and that "Skeem seems to take place in a South Africa where race is of no particular relevance, a South Africa in which all such social divisions have disappeared in the scrabble for personal gain."

=== Awards ===
- Audience's Choice Award at the Abu Dhabi Film Festival (2011, won)
