= Secret Room =

2013 Nigerian thriller film

- Film poster
- Directed by: Eneaji Chris Eneng
- Screenplay by: Jide Okeke
- Produced by: Peacemaker Simon; Crey Ahanonu
- Starring: OC Ukeje; Jide Kosoko; Linda Ejiofor; Lilian Esoro
- Cinematography: Lukman Abdulraman
- Edited by: Haris Okereke
- Production companies: C & C Screen Production; Green-Leaf Integrated Multi
- Release date: 2013
- Running time: 145 minutes
- Country: Nigeria

Secret Room is a 2013 Nigerian direct-to-video thriller film directed by Eneaji Chris Eneng and starring OC Ukeje, Jide Kosoko, Linda Ejiofor and Lilian Esoro.

== Cast ==
- O. C. Ukeje as Kingsley Ojei
- Jide Kosoko as Ambassador John Furiye
- Lilian Esoro as Edna Ojei
- Linda Ejiofor as Ada Obika
- Monique Samuel

== See also ==
- List of Nigerian films of 2013
