= Fidelis Duker =

Nigerian filmmaker

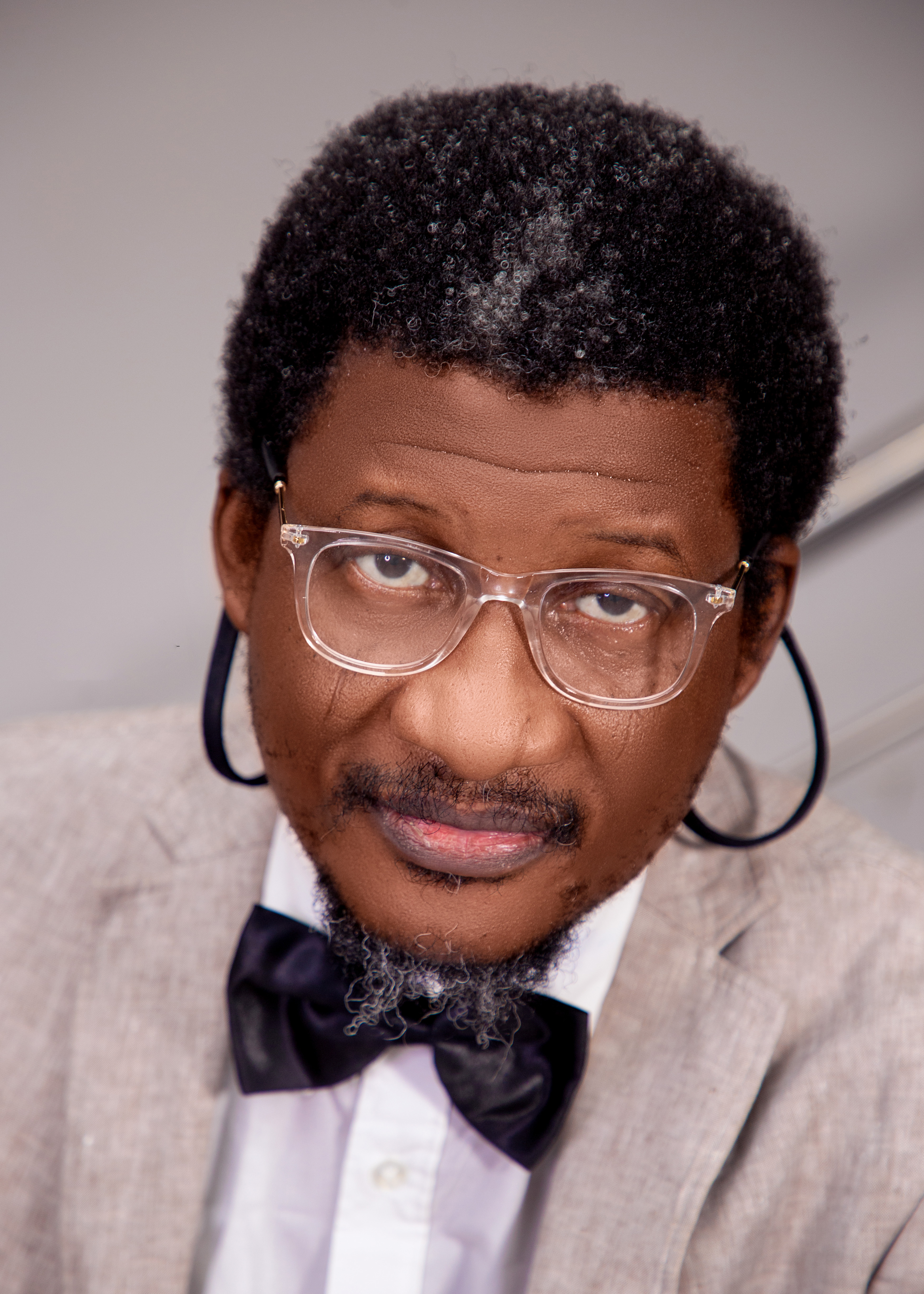
- Duker in Calabar 2022
- Occupations: Film director; film producer; media mogul
- Years active: 1988–present
- Works: London Blues

Fidelis Duker is a Nigerian filmmaker and film festival organiser.

== Career ==
Duker started his career in the year 1988 writing dramas for NTA, Nigeria's public broadcast television network.

In 2003, Duker birthed the idea of the Abuja International Film Festival (AIFF), one of Africa's biggest and longest-running film festivals held yearly in Abuja of Nigeria, for which he sits on the board as the Founder of the event holding for its 18th time in 2021.

== Nominations and recognitions ==
In 2016, Duker won a 'Lifetime Achievement Award,' at the Best of Nollywood Award (BON) held in Aba.

In March 2023, Duker was named as one of the members of jury for the Pan African Film and Television Festival of Ouagadougou, FESPACO.

== Filmography ==
- Ese Atijo – Yoruba – 1993
- Skeleton – Igbo – 1994
- Nemesis – English – 1995
- Not My Will – English – 1996
- Nemesis 2 – English - 1996
- Scandals – English - 1997
- Destined To Die 1 – English – 1997
- Scandals 2 – English - 1998
- Destined To Die 2 – English - 1998
- Blood Brothers – English - 1998
- Visa To Hell – English - 1999
- King Of Money – English - 1999
- Doctor Death - English - 2000
- Enemy Within - English – 2001
- Pure Love – English - 2002
- Hot Passion – English – 2002
- Baka Boys – English - 2003
- Night Nurses - English - 2003
- Jesu Mushin – English – 2004
- Paradise In America - 2005
- London Blues – English – 2006
- A Means To An End – English 2007
- Senseless – English - 2008 starring Segun Arinze, Bimbo Akintola, Kanayo Kanayo, Femi Branch, Ngozi Ezeonu
- Cash And Carry – English - 2009
- Asiri Ile – Yoruba - 2009
- Onyeama – Igbo – 2010
- Sade Oloso – Yoruba - 2011
- Dada Oni Paki – Yoruba - 2012

== TV productions ==
- Images – TV series – 2001
- Eldorado – TV series – 2005
- Girls Next Door – 2007
- Kids Alone – 2008
