= Thishiwe Ziqubu =

South African film director, writer and actor (born 1985)

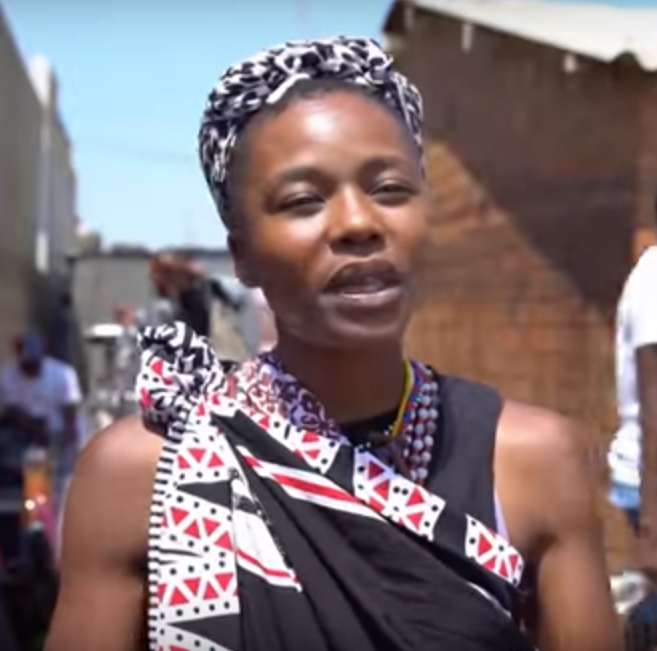
- Thishiwe Ziqubu talking about directing MTV Shuga in 2019
- Born: 5 August 1985 (age 41)
- Education: African Film and Drama Academy
- Occupations: film director and actor
- Years active: 2011- present
- Awards: 2016 Africa Movie Academy Awards for Best Actress in a Supporting Role

Thishiwe Ziqubu (born 5 August 1985) is a South African film director, writer and actor. He won Best Actress in a Supporting Role at the 2016 Africa Movie Academy Awards for his portrayal of Tshaka in the romantic comedy Tell Me Sweet Something. In 2019, he directed episodes of MTV Shuga Down South.

Ziqubu is a trans man.

== Education ==
Ziqubu studied scriptwriting and directing after high school. He later attended the African Film and Drama Academy (AFDA), a film school. He also completed an Acting for Film programme at the Los Angeles campus of the New York Film Academy.

== Career ==
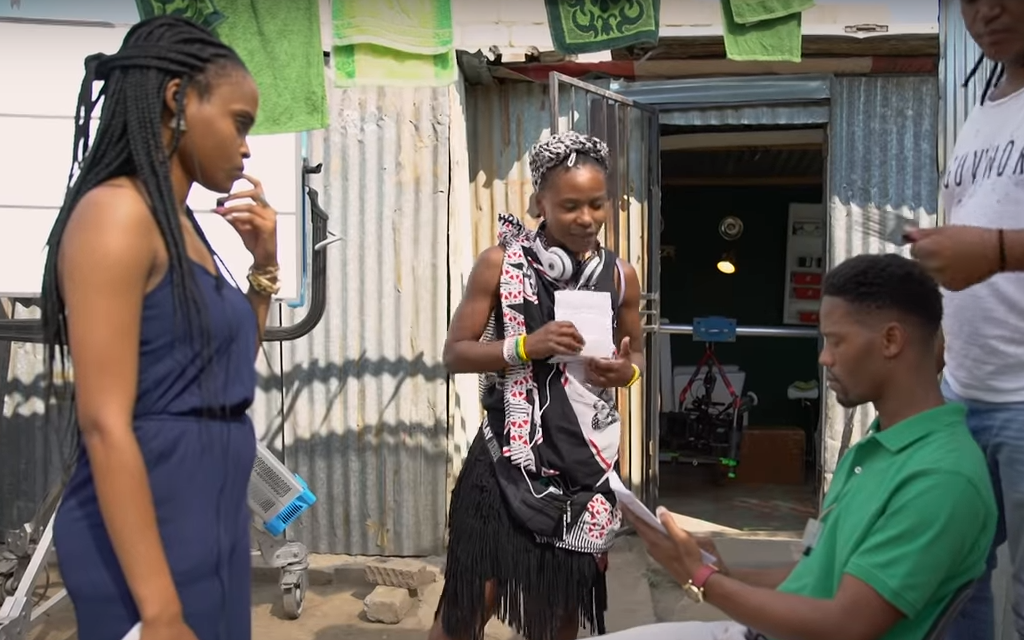
Ziqubu directing Lerato Walaza and another in MTV Shuga episode

Ziqubu made his acting debut in the 2011 drama film Man on Ground, which helped to move his career forward. As a scriptwriter and director, he wrote and directed three independent short films: Out Of Luck, Subdued and Between the Lines. He has also written for South African television soap operas Isidingo and Rhythm City and for Is'Thunzi, a drama series. He co-created, wrote (as head writer) and directed a supernatural four-part drama series entitled Emoyeni.

In 2019, he directed episodes of the second season of TV series MTV Shuga Down South.

== Partial filmography ==
Year	Title	Role
2011	Man on Ground	Zodwa
2014	Hard to get	Skiets
2015	While You Weren't Looking	Shado
2015	Tell Me Sweet Something	Tshaka
2016	Wonder Boy For President	Mbali Sithole
2018	Measure of A Woman	Charlie
2019	Into Infinity	Katherine 'Kit' Makena
2021	Trapped	Thando
