= Jamie Ramsay =

British long-distance runner

Jamie Ramsay is a British long distance runner, who ran 17,000 kilometres (11,000 mi) from Vancouver, British Columbia, Canada, to Buenos Aires, Argentina, in 600 days.

== Personal life ==
Ramsay was born in Scotland and resides in London.

== Vancouver to Buenos Aires ==
When Ramsay realised that he was unfulfilled in his desk job, he decided to undertake the challenge of running from Vancouver to Buenos Aires. His motivation was a desire to live life on his own terms: running was already his passion, and it would enable him to do something physically demanding while gaining a particular perspective from travelling on foot. He chose the route because of its relative safety compared with other possibilities.

The run required little planning. Ramsay already had a good level of fitness, having already completed a few marathons; all he needed was the right equipment. Having decided the start and end points of the route, everything in between was planned day by day: some days running marathon distances or longer, depending on where towns were; on other occasions stopping if there was good reason. On days on which he ran, he averaged more than a marathon.

He mostly slept in his tent in North America but in South America he frequently stayed in cheap hostels. His diet consisted of porridge for breakfast, pasta and tuna for dinner, and whatever food he could find during the day: fruit, sugar cane, biscuits, and, on one occasion, he claimed in an interview, iguana.

The toughest part of the route was the Ruta 34 in Argentina, a 700-kilometre (430 mi) straight, flat road, with nothing to observe, while temperatures sometimes reached over 45 °C (113 °F). The dual carriageway is the main route to the north of the country from Buenos Aires, and Ramsay had jumped off the road to avoid lorries. The biggest personal achievement was traversing the Atacama Desert and then over the Andes. Ramsay described the scenery as "intensely beautiful", as he encountered vicunas and flamingoes along the way.

The run took 600 days to complete, beginning August 2014, and reaching his destination just in time for New Year's Eve 2015. He raised money for CALM, Water Aid and Macmillan.

== Awards ==
In the National Adventure Awards of 2016, Ramsay won the Scottish Adventurer of the Year, and Physical Endeavour awards.
