= Jackie Appiah =

Canadian-born Ghanaian actress

- Born: 5 December 1983 (age 42); Toronto, Ontario, Canada
- Occupation: Actress
- Years active: 2001–present
- Spouse: Peter Agyemang (m. 2005; div. 2008)
- Awards: Best Actress in a Leading Role at the 2010 Africa Movie Academy Awards; and Best Actress in a Supporting Role at the Africa Movie Academy Awards in 2007

Jackie Appiah (born 5 December 1983) is a Canadian- Ghanaian actress who has become one of the celebrated figures in the African movie industry. She is known for her career as a movie director, producer, fashion model, and a humanitarian. Appiah has had a prolific and acclaimed career in the Ghanaian and Nigerian film industries since the early 2000s. She is considered a versatile leading actress in Nollywood and Ghallywood, earning respect both locally and internationally.

== Early life ==
Jackie was born on 5 December 1983 to Kwabena Appiah into the Appiah family in Toronto, Canada. She is the last of five children. Her paternal uncle was the Ghanaian statesman Joe Appiah. She spent her early childhood in Canada and moved to Ghana with her mother at the age of 10. She is popularly known by her maiden name, Appiah.

== Career ==
Appiah began her acting career in the late 1990s, appearing in various Ghanaian television shows and movies. Appiah remembers herself as being shy the first time she went on set. "It was a Venus Film Production titled Divine Love and I had to play the role of Kate, the protagonist. I didn't believe I did too well. I fumbled, but many people did not notice it". Despite her nervousness, the first-timer said she succeeded in impressing everyone.

Her breakthrough role came in 2003 when she starred in the Ghanaian film Princess Tyra, which brought her widespread recognition and cemented her status as a leading actress in West African cinema. Following the success of Princess Tyra, Appiah went on to appear in numerous other Ghanaian and Nigerian films, further establishing herself as one of the most prominent and influential actresses in the region.

Appiah's appearance on screen became regular when she was invited by Edward Seddoh Junior, the writer of Things We Do For Love, where she played the role of Enyonam Blagogee. She later took part in movies like Tentacles, Games People Play, Sun-city and many other TV series.

Appiah says her best part was in Mummy's Daughter by Venus Films. The film tells the story of the Bartels Family, where she played the role of a Princess, the daughter. She loved how she acted, and was happy with the role played.

=== Nollywood breakthrough and success ===
Appiah was already known to Nollywood through her many successful Ghanaian films, including Beyoncé - The President's Daughter, Princess Tyra, Passion of the Soul, Pretty Queen, The Prince's Bride, The King is Mine, and The Perfect Picture. Her notable Nollywood films includes Black Soul and Bitter Blessing, alongside Nollywood actor Ramsey Nouah and My Last Wedding, alongside Nollywood actor Emeka Ike.

In 2013, she won the Best International Actress award at the Papyrus Magazine Screen Actors Awards (PAMSAA) 2013. which was held in Abuja, Nigeria.

=== Other work ===
Jackie's face can be seen on many billboards and TV commercials in Ghana including a GSMF advert on protection against HIV/AIDS. She won the face of U.B in a promotion she did for them on TV commercials, and she was the face of IPMC for commercials and billboards. "GSMF" was her first TV commercial.

Aside from being an actress, Appiah has also been involved in various philanthropic initiatives, using her celebrity status to support causes such as education and healthcare in Ghana. As a result, she has received numerous awards and accolades for both her contributions to the film industry and her humanitarian efforts.

== Personal life ==
Jackie married Peter Agyemang in 2005 with whom she had a son, Damien Agyemang. They got divorced after three years.

It was rumoured in 2020 that Jackie Appiah got pregnant by Liberian President George Weah, though she dismissed the rumour on her Instagram page, stating: "Laughter that dispels lies and fabricated stories."

== Filmography ==
- Things We Do For Love (2003-2016) as Enyonam
- Divine Love (2004) as Kate
- The Heart of Men (2009) as Adeline
- The Power of a Woman
- Run Baby Run
- Beyoncé - The President Daughter (2006) as Ciara Mensah
- The Return of Beyoncé (2006)
- Mummy’s Daughter (2006)
- The Love Doctor (2007) as Cynthia
- Royal Battle (2007)
- Chasing Hope
- Princess Tyra (2007) as Ashley
- The Prince's bride
- Fake Feelings (2007) as Adwoa Pokua
- Wind of Love (2008) as Precious
- Total Love (2008) as Louisa
- Passion of the Soul (2008) as Najah
- Mortal Desire
- Pretty Queen (2008) as Empress
- The Prince's Bride
- The King is Mine
- Spirit of a Dancer
- Excess Money (2008) as Claribel
- Blindfold (2008)
- Before My Eyes (2008) as Paris
- Virginity (2009) as Tarrah
- Career woman
- Passion Lady
- Her Excellency
- The Perfect Picture (2009) as Aseye
- Prince of the Niger (2009) as Olamma
- My Last Wedding (2009) as Linda
- Love Games (2009)
- Tears of Womanhood (2009) as Samira
- Night Wedding (2010) as Nneka
- A Cry for Justice (2010) as Nonye
- 4 Plays (2010) as Jezel
- 4 Play Reloaded (2010) as Jezel
- Death after Birth (2011) as Zynell
- Golden Stool
- Deadly Assignment
- Turning Point (2012) as Grace
- Wrath of a Woman
- Blind Lust
- Black Soul (2010) as Ruth
- Against My Will
- Royal Kidnap
- End of Royal Kidnap
- The Siege
- Royal Honour
- Eye of the gods
- The Comforter
- Palace Slave
- Throwing Stones
- Comfort My Soul
- Above Love
- Wind of Sorrow
- Piece of My Soul
- Cold Heart
- Golden Heart
- A Bitter Blessing
- Queens heart
- Kings heart
- Forever young (2010) as Latisha
- Barrister Anita
- Deep Fever
- Sisters At War (2014)
- The Good Doctor (2021) as Idara
- Cheaters (2013) as Ana Lisa
- The Perfect Picture: Ten Years Later (2019)
- Reason To Kill (2011) as Jolie
- Grooms Bride (2012) as Asumbe
- Heart of Men
- Stigma (2013) as Vanessa
- Yolo
- Perfect Love 1ins
- Perfect Love 2
- For Love and Country (2025) as Selina Adams

== Awards and nominations ==
For her work as an actress, Appiah has been marked by several accolades including multiple awards and nominations. She notably won the awards for Best Actress in a Leading Role running out in the 2010 Africa Movie Academy Awards (AMAA). She was also honoured the Best Actress in a Supporting Role at the AAMAs in 2007. She received two nominations for Best Actress in a Leading Role and Best Upcoming Actress at the AMAAs in 2008. Glitz Africa honoured her with the Excellence in Creative Art Award at Ghana Women of the Year Honours 2023.

Year	Event	Prize	Recipient	Result
2007	3rd Africa Movie Academy Awards	Best Supporting Actress	Beyonce: The President's Daughter	Won
2010	6th Africa Movie Academy Awards	Best Actress Leading Role	The Perfect Picture	Won
2010	2010 Ghana Movie Awards	Best Actress	4 Play	Won
2010	City People Entertainment Awards	Best Ghanaian Actress		Won
2011	2011 Ghana Movie Awards	Best Actress Leading Role (English)	Reason To Kill	Nominated
2011	2011 Nigeria Entertainment Awards	Pan African Actress Of The Year		Won
2012	2012 Ghana Movie Awards	Best Actress Leading Role	Grooms Bride	Nominated
2012	Ghana National Youth Achievers Awards	Performing Arts		Won
2012	African Women Of Worth Awards	Best Actress		Won
2013	2013 Africa Magic Viewers Choice Awards	Best Actress In Drama	The Perfect Picture	Won
2013	2013 Ghana Movie Awards	Best Actress Leading role	Cheaters	Won
2013	2013 Ghana Movie Awards	Glits Magazine favorite actress	Cheaters	Won
2013	Nafca	Best Actress Diaspora	Turning Point	Won
2013	Pyprus Magazine Screen Actors Awards	Best International Actress		Won
2013	The F.A.C.E List Awards (USA)	Achievement In Africa Entertainment		Won
2014	2014 Africa Magic Viewers Choice Awards	Best Actress Comedy Role	Cheaters	Nominated
2014	2014 Ghana Movie Awards	Best Actress Leading Role	Sisters At War	Nominated
2014	2014 Ghana Movie Awards	Favorite Actress	Sisters At War	Nominated
2015	2015 Africa Magic Viewers Choice Awards	Best Actress In Comedy	A Letter From Adam	Nominated
2015	2015 Ghana Movie Awards	Favorite Actress		Nominated
2024	Africa Movie Academy Awards	Best Actress in a Leading Role	Red Carpet	Won
