= Vimbai Mutinhiri =

Zimbabwean television personality

Vimbai Mutinhiri-Ekpenyong
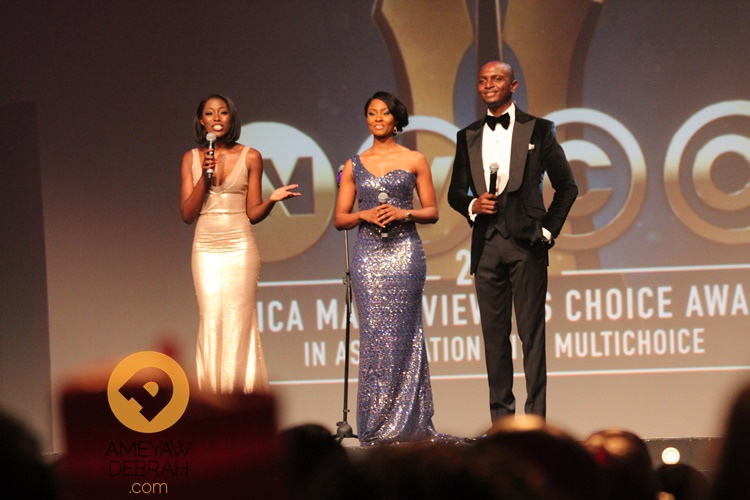
- Vimbai, Osas and IK hosting the Africa Magic Viewers Choice Awards in Lagos
- Born: 18 February 1987 (age 39); Harare, Zimbabwe
- Education: University of Cape Town
- Occupations: TV Presenter, Model and Actress
- Spouse: Dru Ekpenyong (m.2020)
- Parents: Ambrose Mutinhiri (father); Tracy Mutinhiri (mother)

Vimbai Mutinhiri-Ekpenyong (born 18 February 1987) is a Zimbabwean actress, model and television personality. She was born in Harare, Zimbabwe and raised in Belgrade, Serbia and in Johannesburg, South Africa. Before participating in Big Brother Africa Amplified in 2011, she studied in South Africa graduating from the University of Cape Town with an honours degree in politics, philosophy and economics.

== Background ==
Vimbai is the youngest of four children of Ambrose Mutinhiri and Tracy Mutinhiri, both of whom are Zimbabwean cabinet ministers. Ambrose Mutinhiri was previously sanctioned by the American and Canadian governments in the 2000s for his role in the Mugabe administration.

She attended at St Edward's School, Oxford and Arundel School in Harare, graduating in 2000 and 2002 respectively. She then studied social sciences at the University of Cape Town, graduating in 2008 with a bachelor's degree.

== Career ==
Vimbai started her career at the age of 15 years as an actress in Zimbabwe, in a short film titled Who's In Charge, which featured at the Zimbabwe International Film Festival. She had a lead role in Zimbabwe's first soap opera titled Studio 263. While studying at the University of Cape Town, she continued modelling.

In 2011, Vimbai took part in Big Brother Africa season 6 (Amplified).

She hosted various major African events, including the first Africa Magic Viewers' Choice Awards broadcast live to 54 countries from Lagos, Nigeria.

She served as the Face of Castle Milk Stout (Cameroon) and has also walked the runway at SA Fashion Week and Zimbabwe Fashion Week.

=== Big Brother Amplified ===
Vimbai was the 16th housemate to be evicted, on Day 84.

Title	Type	Date	Role	Description
Big Brother Africa Amplified	Reality TV series	2011	Herself	Finished 9th out of 26

=== Star Gist ===
After Big Brother, she was chosen as the new presenter for the entertainment and lifestyle show Star Gist on Africa Magic Entertainment. Vimbai co-hosted the show, which was broadcast across Africa, with 22-year-old South African, Lawrence Maleka.

== Personal life ==
In May 2020, during the COVID-19 pandemic, Vimbai married Nigerian businessman Andrew Ekpenyong in Calabar, Nigeria.
