= The Perfect Picture (2009 film) =

Ghanaian Film

- Directed by: Shirley Frimpong-Manso
- Written by: Shirley Frimpong-Manso
- Produced by: Shirley Frimpong-Manso
- Production company: Sparrow Production
- Release date: 2009
- Country: Ghana
- Language: English

The Perfect Picture is a Ghanaian movie produced and written by Shirley Frimpong-Manso in 2009.

== Plot ==
In what seems like a perfect life, three beautiful women who are pushing thirty make bold attempts to change their lives even when destiny plays its joke on them. With a marriage that seems almost doomed from the beginning, to an affair with an unlikely candidate and the endless pursuit of love, the three friends will learn the harsh lessons of life, the challenges of marriage, the fatality of falling in love and the rewards of having a good laugh in the midst of sorrow. The Perfect Picture offers a colorful and humorous insight into a world where everything is as perfect as your life and that of your friends.

== Cast ==
- Jackie Appiah as Aseye
- Lydia Forson as Dede
- Naa Ashorkor Doku-Mensah as Akasi
- Adjetey Anang as Fela
- Chris Attoh as Larry
- Ken Attoh as photographer
- Joselyn Dumas as Mrs. Appiah
- John Dumelo as Fiifi Taylor
- Yvette Owusu as married woman
- Kofi Gyetua as married man
