= Timothy Greene =

South African actor, film director and writer

Tim Greene
- Born: 1969 (age 55–56); Cape Town, South Africa
- Other names: Tim Greene
- Occupation(s): Actor, film director, writer
- Known for: Boy Called Twist

Timothy John Greene (born 1969 in Cape Town, South Africa) is a South African actor, film director, and writer. He is also known as Tim Greene and cited under that name in most articles about him.

== The making of Boy Called Twist ==
Greene's first feature film Boy Called Twist was an innovation in South African film finance. In 2002 Greene put out a call that he was looking for 1000 investors who could each risk R1000.00, (app US$145) spreading the risk across a broad community of like-minded people. By August 2003 a million rands had been secured.

Two trusts contributed further grants to a total of R400,000.00 to the project.

Principal photography lasted 21 days and was completed on schedule and within budget. Real life street kids participated in the movie. The offline edit of the film was screened in 2004 and a further R1,000.000.00 was committed to the film's completion by the National Film and Video Foundation of South Africa.

On 18 November 2004, the film premiered to a standing ovation at the Cape Town World Cinema Festival. In May 2005, the film screened at the Cannes Film Festival, representing South Africa in the Tous Les Cinema de Monde (All the Cinemas of the World) section. Greene also organized an outdoor screening for street kids in Cape Town.

Throughout the making of the movie, Greene kept his funders informed of the progress of the movie via email and all 1000 Associate Producers are listed in the film's credits, making it the longest Associate Producer credit title in history.

== Selected filmography ==
Feature Films:

- 2004 Boy Called Twist
- 2011 Skeem
- 2020 Cabin Fever
- TBA The Fury

TV:

- 2002 Tsha Tsha
- 2003 Zero Tolerance
- 2006 Hard Copy (7 episodes)
- 2009 The Lab (2 episodes)
- 2017 Taryn & Sharon (13 seasons)

Short Films:

- 1998 Kap ‘an, Driver
- 1995 Corner Caffie
