= Last Flight to Abuja =

2012 Nigerian disaster thriller film

- Theatrical poster
- Directed by: Obi Emelonye
- Written by: Tunde Babalola; Obi Emelonye; Amaka Obi-Emelonye
- Produced by: Obi Emelonye; Charles Thompson; Nyimbi Odero
- Starring: Omotola Jalade Ekeinde; Hakeem Kae-Kazim; Jim Iyke; Jide Kosoko; Uru Eke; Anthony Monjaro
- Cinematography: James M. Costello
- Edited by: Ben Nugent
- Music by: Luke Corradine
- Production company: Nollywood Film Factory
- Distributed by: Netflix
- Release dates: 29 June 2012 (UK); 3 August 2012 (Nigeria)
- Running time: 81 min
- Country: Nigeria
- Language: English
- Budget: ₦40 million
- Box office: ₦57,050,000 (domestic gross)

Last Flight to Abuja is a 2012 Nigerian disaster thriller film written by Tunde Babalola, directed and produced by Obi Emelonye, and starring Omotola Jalade Ekeinde, Hakeem Kae-Kazim and Jim Iyke. Shot in Lagos, the film received five nominations at the 2013 Africa Movie Academy Awards, winning the category "Best Film by an African Abroad". On 15 June 2020, Last Flight To Abuja began streaming on Netflix eight years after it first premiered in London.

== Plot ==
On board the last flight of Flamingo Airways from Lagos to Abuja, it is a Friday night in 2006. The plane leaves on time, and everything goes well until disaster strikes. While the pilots try to regain control of the flight, flashbacks reveal the reasons why each passenger took the flight and now has to face their destiny. It is based on a true story.

== Cast ==
- Omotola Jalade-Ekeinde as Suzie
- Hakeem Kae-Kazim as Adesola
- Ali Nuhu as Dan
- Jim Iyke as David
- Anthony Monjaro as aircraft captain
- Uru Eke as air hostess
- Tila Ben as passenger
- Jide Kosoko as Chief Nike
- Celine Loader as Captain Seye
- Uche Odoputa as Efe
- Jennifer Oguzie as Yolanda
- Samuel Ajibola as Jimi
- Ashaju Oluwakemi
- Nneka J. Adams as Mrs. Ime Ibong
- Olumide Bakare as elderly man
- Chidera Orji as Mrs. Angele Efe
- Gordon Irole as Moses
- Doris Ekeh as Hawa
- Abigail Oyinkasola as Anny
- Edward Takpa as Kevin
- Cindy Okosun as Gana
- Vincent Nwachukwu as Hycent
- Rachel Ekiama as Gina
- Gozy Ekeh as Madge
- Reuben Onyuka as engineer
- Joe Shamel as Brian
- Cheeka Okereke as TV presenter

== Production ==
During the filming process, Emelonye had to deal with his peers, banks, and bureaucrats at Murtala Muhammed International Airport in Lagos.

== Reception ==
Last Flight to Abuja received mixed reviews. Praised for its cinematography and music score, most critics stated that the CGI and visual effects left a lot to be desired. The film grossed ₦8,350,000 in its opening weekend with an attendance of 9,638, and went on to gross ₦24,000,000 in its first week, topping the chart in West African cinemas and outperforming Hollywood movies such as The Amazing Spider-Man, Think Like a Man, The Avengers and Madagascar 3. It was released in many cities, including Lagos and London, where it received a four-star rating from Odeon Cinemas.

== See also ==
- List of Nigerian films of 2012
