= Man on Ground =

- Film poster
- Directed by: Akin Omotoso
- Written by: Akin Omotoso
- Produced by: Hakeem Kae-Kazim; Fabian Adeoye Lojede; Rosie Motene; Akin Omotoso
- Starring: Hakeem Kae-Kazim; Fabian Adeoye Lojede; Fana Mokoena; Bubu Mazibuko; Thishiwe Ziqubu
- Cinematography: Paul Michelson
- Edited by: Aryan Kaganof
- Music by: Joel Assaizky; Amu
- Production company: Tom Pictures
- Release date: 12 September 2011 (TIFF)
- Running time: 80 minutes
- Countries: Nigeria; South Africa
- Languages: English; Yoruba; Zulu

Man on Ground is a 2011 Nigerian South African drama film directed by Akin Omotoso. It was screened and premiered at the 2011 Toronto International Film Festival. The film tells a story about how Xenophobia in South Africa affect the lives of two Nigerian brothers.

== Plot ==
Ade, an accomplished financial executive and his brother Femi are South-African immigrants. Unknown to Ade, his brother, who is in South-Africa because of a self-imposed exile due to political affiliation in Nigeria has been kidnapped. On discovery that his brother is missing Ade carries out investigations to unravel the mystery and discovers the difficult lifestyle subjected to him. Ade pays homage to a former employer of Femi, when violence occurred which forced him to live with the boss. The frequent violent riots in the neighbourhood open up many revelations about the life of his brother.

== Cast ==
- Hakeem Kae-Kazim as Ade
- Fabian Adeoye Lojede as Femi
- Fana Mokoena as Timothy
- Bubu Mazibuko as Lindiwe
- Thishiwe Ziqubu as Zodwa
- Makhaola Ndebele as Vusi
- Mandisa Bardill as Nadia
- Joshua Chisholm as Young Ade
- Mbongeni Nhlapo as Young Femi
- Eugene Khoza as Hype man

== Release ==
It had its premiere at the 2011 Toronto International Film Festival on 12 September 2011.

== Accolades ==
List of Major Awards
| Award | Category | Recipients and nominees | Result |
|---|---|---|---|
| Africa Film Academy (8th Africa Movie Academy Awards) | Best Film | Akin Omotoso | Nominated |
| Africa Film Academy (8th Africa Movie Academy Awards) | Best Sound | | Nominated |
| Africa Film Academy (8th Africa Movie Academy Awards) | Best Best Cinematography | | Nominated |
| Africa Film Academy (8th Africa Movie Academy Awards) | Best Editing | | Nominated |
| Africa Film Academy (8th Africa Movie Academy Awards) | Best Actor | Hakeem Kae-Kazim | Nominated |
| Africa Film Academy (8th Africa Movie Academy Awards) | Best Supporting Actor | Fana Mokoena | Won |
| Africa Film Academy (8th Africa Movie Academy Awards) | Best Director | | Nominated |
| Africa Film Academy (8th Africa Movie Academy Awards) | Special Jury Prize | Akin Omotoso | Won |
