= Contract (2012 film) =

- Theatrical poster
- Directed by: Shirley Frimpong-Manso
- Written by: Hetty Owusu; Shirley Frimpong-Manso
- Produced by: Yvonne Okoro; Ken Attoh; Shirley Frimpong-Manso
- Starring: Yvonne Okoro; Joseph Benjamin; Hlomla Dandala
- Cinematography: John Passah; Anthony Kitsi-Prempeh; Richard Asante
- Edited by: Nana Akua Manso
- Music by: Ivan Ayitey; Koffi Boache-Ansah
- Production company: Sparrow Productions
- Release dates: 28 December 2012 (Ghana); 22 March 2013 (Nigeria)
- Countries: Ghana; Nigeria
- Language: English
- Box office: ₦11,447,636 (Nigerian domestic gross)

Contract is a 2012 Ghanaian film produced by Yvonne Okoro and directed by Shirley Frimpong-Manso, starring Hlomla Dandala, Joseph Benjamin and Yvonne Okoro. It received six nominations at the 9th Africa Movie Academy Awards including: Best Director, Achievement In Screenplay, Best Actor In A Leading Role and Best Actress In A Leading Role.

== Cast ==
- Hlomla Dandala as Peter Puplampo
- Joseph Benjamin as Kuuku
- Yvonne Okoro as Abena Boateng
- Katouchka Addaquay as Sandra
- Doris Ansah as Mrs. Poplampo
- Jasmine Baroudi as Nadia
- Magnus Brooks as Steve
- Prince William Darlington as Doctor
- Amanorbea Dodoo as Anna
- Joseline Nketia as Nana Ama
- Paul Pepera as Mr. Sawyer
- Regina Sarfoa Adu as Nurse

== Reception ==
360nobs rated the movie 6.5 out of 10, and commented that the movie is exciting.
