= The Mirror Boy =

Nigerian fantasy adventure drama film

- Theatrical Poster
- Directed by: Obi Emelonye
- Written by: Obi Emelonye
- Produced by: Patrick Campbell
- Starring: Trew Sider; Genevieve Nnaji; Osita Iheme; Edward Kagutuzi; Fatima Jabbe
- Narrated by: Frazier James
- Cinematography: Clive Norman
- Edited by: Andrew Webber
- Release date: 14 January 2011 (United States)
- Running time: 84 minutes
- Country: The Gambia
- Language: English
- Budget: £250,000 (estimated)

The Mirror Boy is a 2011 Nigerian fantasy adventure drama film written and directed by Obi Emelonye, produced by Patrick Campbell and starring Genevieve Nnaji, Osita Iheme and Edward Kagutuzi. The film which was shot in England and the Gambia, received 3 nominations at the 2011 Africa Movie Academy Awards.

== Plot ==
The film tells the uplifting story of a young teenage African British boy who is taken back to the land of his mother's birth, but then gets mysteriously lost in a foreboding forest and embarks on a magical journey that teaches him about himself and the mystery of the father he has never seen.

== Cast ==
- Trew Sider - Rodney Marsh
- Tabitha Wild - Mrs. Marsh
- Genevieve Nnaji - Teema
- Osita Iheme - Mirror Boy
- Edward Kagutuzi - Tijan
- Fatima Jabbe - Queen
- Emma Fletcher - Miss Nugent
- Peter Halpin - PC Andrews
- Aisha Barry - Leema
- Victor Carvalho - Chief
- Felix Ceesay - Police Sergeant
- Ify Chukwu - Police Officer
- Mariama Feh - Forest Queen
- Awa Gassama - Immigration Officer
- John Charles Njie - Samba
- Francesca Marston - Tanya

== See also ==
- List of Nigerian films of 2011
