= Obi Emelonye =

Nollywood movie director

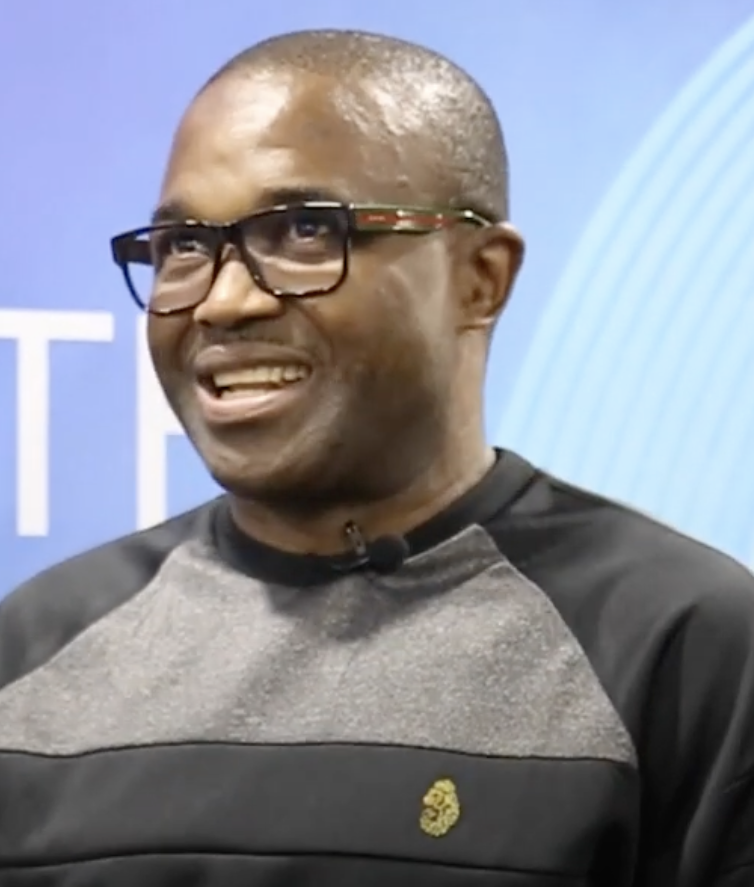
- Born: 24 March 1967 (age 59); Port Harcourt, Nigeria
- Education: Eastern Mediterranean University; University of Nigeria, Nsukka; University of Wolverhampton
- Occupations: film maker producer director
- Years active: 2000–present
- Notable credits: Last Flight to Abuja; Echoes of War; The Mirror Boy, and Last Flight to Abuja; Heart 2 hearth
- Awards: See below

Obi Emelonye (born 24 March 1967) is a Nigerian film director. He is known for directing award-winning films such as Last Flight to Abuja (2012), The Mirror Boy (2011), and Onye Ozi (2013).

In 2020, during the coronavirus pandemic, which shut down businesses globally, Obi Emelonye became the first film director to make a movie via Zoom, by working remotely with cast members in London and Lagos. The movie, Heart 2 Heart, received critical acclaim from major media outlets all over the world.

In December 2022, Obi Emelonye was presented with the British Urban Film Festival honorary award by producer/director Don Omope for a 20+ year outstanding contribution to cinema at a ceremony in London.

== Education ==
He is a member of the UK Directors Guild as well as the British Film Institute (BFI).

== Filmography ==
- Black Mail - 2022
- Badamasi - 2021
- Crazy Lovely, Cool - 2018
- The Calabash (featuring Princess Halliday, Collete Nwadike, Alex Nwokedi, Bayray McNwizu, Lisa Omorodion, Enyinna Nwigwe, Uru Eke, Chris Okagbue) - 2015
- Thy Will Be Done - 2015
- Onye Ozi (The Messenger) - 2013
- Oxford Gardens- 2013
- Last Flight to Abuja - 2012
- The Mirror Boy - 2011
- The London Successor - 2006
- Lucky Joe - 2006
- Echoes of War - 2004
- Money Miss Road

== Awards and nominations ==
| Year | Award | Category | Result | Ref |
|---|---|---|---|---|
| 2021 | Africa Movie Academy Awards | Best Film by an African Living Abroad | Won | |
| 2021 | Changing Face International Festival | Best Trailer Award | Won | |
| 2023 | Africa Magic Viewers' Choice Awards | Best Director | Nominated | |
