= IK Osakioduwa =

Nigerian broadcaster

Ikponmwosa Osakioduwa
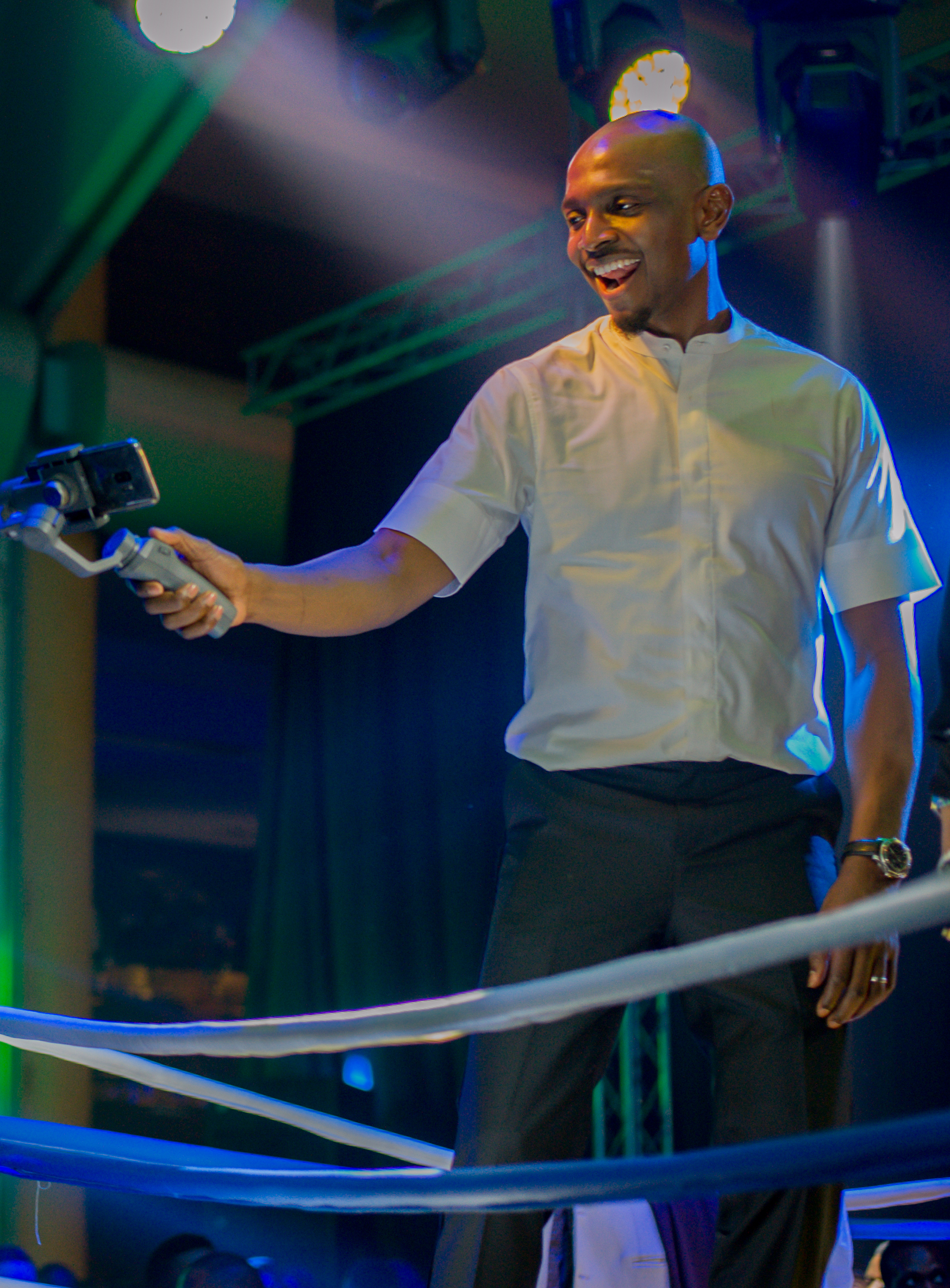
- Ik Osakioduwa at AMVCA After party 2021
- Born: 21 May 1979 (age 47); Lagos, Nigeria
- Other name: Wildchild
- Education: University of Lagos
- Occupations: On air personality, TV Presenter, TV Producer, MD Lite Communication Limited
- Years active: 2001-present
- Spouse: Olohije Osakioduwa (m. 2008)
- Children: 2
- Parent(s): Rtd Gen Sam & Mrs Felicia Oviawe
- Website: http://ikosakioduwa.com/

Ikponmwosa Osakioduwa (born 21 May 1979) is a Nigerian radio and television on-air personality. He was known to most just as Wildchild but since his marriage, has been known as simply IK. He is known for his work with Rhythm 93.7 FM, but he is also a presenter on MNet's Studio 53, and is best known as the presenter of Big Brother Africa.

== Biography ==
He was born in Lagos, Nigeria to homemaker Felicia Oviawe and Brigadier General Samuel Oviawe, he is the middle child of five children. I.k. started out on stage at a young age, acting in stage plays and being in the choir as early as age 7. At age 15 along with some of his siblings and cousins, he recorded a tape in which he pretended to be a radio show host taking calls from listeners. IK attended The University of Lagos where he got his start in the television industry on a show called Campus circuit television which aired on Africa Independent Television. After that he took a break from the industry to concentrate on his education and he graduated with a degree in Economics.

== Career ==
Early Career
He graduated from King's College, Lagos and then studied Economics at the University of Lagos. While studying he took part in many stage plays and concerts, where he discovered and groomed his talent as a Master of Ceremonies/Host. After graduating from University in 2001, Osakioduwa worked for Rhythm 93.7 FM, as a presenter popularly known as The Wild Child (thanks to his humorous and unpredictable personality). However, in compliance with the National Youth Service Corps, which is a one-year mandatory service of all graduate Nigerians, he had to leave the radio station to serve in a neighbouring state. He also worked in an advertising firm as a Client Service Executive, and in 2005 he returned to the radio station, Rhythm 93.7, and retained the name The Wild Child.
Temptation Nigeria
The show featured participants from across Nigeria whose knowledge of their country is the major strength for participation. Hosted jointly by IK Osakioduwa, and Kemi Adetiba.
Studio 53
As a field presenter on the M-Net magazine show that showcases cultural events, historical places, music, art, design, fashion and celebrity personalities from across the African continent.
Big Brother Africa
He started hosting the reality series in September 2009 taking over from Kabelo Ngakane. Big Brother Africa went on to phenomenal success, putting Osakioduwa in the continental spotlight. The following year, when he became the sole host, Osakioduwa's on-screen enthusiasm and wit made him a milestone sensation, and the show was seen by millions of viewers in the continent. Osakioduwa inked a deal with MNET Africa to continue to host Big Brother Africa, making him the most sought after reality television host in Nigeria / Africa to date. He says, "BBA was the first show I’d done of this magnitude, it was amazing to be in 40-million homes across Africa all at once. At first it’s super intimidating, but you get used to it before the end of the season.".

In 2001, Osakioduwa started as host of the radio program "Rap Kulture". He has been the host for almost all the shows for Rhythm 93.7 FM at one time or another. He's currently on the "Morning Drive" with co-host Anita ‘Omaliicha’ and "Dance Party with IK".

Lagos Countdown Show
In December 2012, similar to the ones in Times Square(New York) Beijing, Dubai, Shanghai, he hosted the Lagos countdown show with co-hosts Ariyike Akinbobola, Quest; which is the first of its kind in Nigeria.

== Personal life ==
Ikponmwosa and Olohije Osakioduwa were married in a church ceremony on 3 October 2008 in Lagos after four years of friendship and a year of dating. In an interview with The Expatriate Magazine, "Olo was the only friend who seemed to get me and did not want to change me…". The couple have two children Osahar and Micah.

In May 2012 Osakioduwa lost his mother, Felicia Oviawe to cancer.
