= MultiChoice =

South African based satellite TV company in Sub-Saharan Africa

MultiChoice Group Ltd.
- Formerly: M-Net Subscription services division
- Type: Public
- Traded as: JSE: MCG
- Industry: Broadcasting; Pay television
- Predecessor: M-Net
- Founded: 9 November 1994; 31 years ago
- Headquarters: Randburg, Gauteng, South Africa
- Areas served: Sub-Saharan Africa; Cape Verde; Madagascar
- Key people: MultiChoice Group: Maxime Saada (Chairman); David Mignot (CEO); CANAL+ Africa: Calvo Mawela (Chairman); David Mignot (CEO)
- Products: Satellite television
- Brands: DStv; GOtv; SuperSport; M-Net; BetKing (49%)
- Revenue: ▼ R 49.98 billion (2025)
- Operating income: ▼ R 4.66 billion (2025)
- Net income: ▲ R 1.78 billion (2025)
- Total assets: ▼ R 39.2 billion (2025)
- Total equity: ▲ R 1.6 billion (2025)
- Owner: Canal+ S.A. (via Canal+ Africa)
- Website: MultiChoice website

MultiChoice is a South African company, owned by French media conglomerate Canal+, that operates DStv, a major satellite television service in Sub-Saharan Africa. It also operates GOtv, a minor terrestrial TV service operating in 9 countries, and formerly Showmax, a subscription video on-demand over-the-top streaming service.

== Overview ==
MultiChoice was formed out of the subscriber-management branch of the M-Net terrestrial pay television company, and broadcasts the full range of M-Net channels on the DStv service. MultiChoice is owned by the media conglomerate of the same name.

One of the subsidiaries of MultiChoice is DStv Stream, formally DStv Now then DStv App, a service that delivers television transmission to mobile devices such as laptops, smart phones and notebooks.

Formerly under NetHold, it had operations in the Scandinavian, Benelux, Central Europe, Greek & Cypriot regions under the Filmnet TV service, Italy via Telepiù, Egypt under CNE (Cable Network of Egypt), Middle East under Gulf TV and Arab Radio and Television Network & Thailand under UBC (United Broadcasting Corporation).

In 2020, MultiChoice had a total subscriber base of 20.1 million viewers throughout Africa, and Naspers asserted that MultiChoice was one of the fastest growing pay-TV operators globally.

== History ==
=== Early years (1983–1991) ===
In 1983, Koos Bekker wrote a paper at Columbia University describing the idea that led to M-Net, and along with two others pitched the idea to Naspers, which acquired a 26% share, leading to Naspers executive Ton Vosloo serving as chair of the board. M-Net lost money in its first few years.

=== Expansion (1992–2017) ===
In 1993, M-Net was divided into two divisions, one focused on transmission of the entertainment channels and the other on cellphone operations, signal distribution and subscriber management. This second division became MultiChoice. The company had been granted a licence to broadcast into Namibia in 1991 and, as a result, in 1996 MultiChoice Africa was established.

In 1992, analogue services were launched in 20 African countries and lasted until 1996 when digital services replaced them. This division, called DStv (Digital Satellite Television), had first been launched in South Africa on October 6, 1995, making it the first direct-to-home digital pay-TV service outside the US.

In 2002, a "Dual-view" decoder was launched by DStv which allowed the simultaneous viewing of two different channels from a single satellite feed. In 2006, a service to mobile devices was trialed and officially launched in 2011 as DStv Mobile (now called DStv Stream, renamed from DStv Now then DStv App).

In October 2011, MultiChoice Nigeria launched GOtv, an affordable terrestrial platform & a compatriot to DStv, which broadcasts all channels from DStv Access and some from DStv Compact packages in 11 Sub-Saharan African countries.

MultiChoice broadcasts in 50 countries in Sub-Saharan Africa, including Cape Verde and Madagascar. Local language programme content is available in French and Portuguese in certain African territories, as well as the 11 official languages within South Africa.

=== IPO and consolidation (2018–2023) ===
In September 2018, Multichoice's then parent company Naspers announced that it would separate its video entertainment business from the bulk of Naspers and list it separately on the Johannesburg Stock Exchange (JSE). The new company would be called MultiChoice Group and would include MultiChoice South Africa, MultiChoice Africa, Showmax Africa, and Irdeto. The listing took place on 27 February 2019, with share code MCG. The share was immediately eligible for inclusion in the JSE Top40, the list of the largest 40 shares by market capitalisation.

In October 2020, French media company Groupe Canal+ acquired 12% stake in MultiChoice. In November, MultiChoice acquired 20% stake in Nigeria's sports betting company, BetKing with plans to launch it in South Africa.

In June 2021, they increased their stake to 49%. In February 2023, French media company Groupe Canal+ acquired a 30.27% stake in the company, which eventually increased to 31.7%.

=== Acquisition by Canal+ S.A. (2024–2025) ===
Nearly a year later, on February 1, 2024, Canal+ made an offer to MultiChoice's investors to acquire remaining shares, subject to regulatory approval, offering a price of R105 per share, 40% higher than the price of R75 offered the previous day. MultiChoice rejected the offer believing it undervalued the company. Following a reprimand by the Takeover Regulation Panel, Canal+ revised its offer and upped its bid to R125 per share (67% higher than the MultiChoice share price). This valued MultiChoice at R55 billion.

In June 2024, Canal+ Group and MultiChoice released a joint circular with the French broadcaster that has obtained 45,2% of company shares with an interim board approving on the revised offer. Both companies made a filing to local regulators in September 2024 with the terms of the agreement remaining unchanged.

Under the deal, Canal+ will spin out MultiChoice SA's broadcasting licence which includes DStv as an independent entity to comply with the Electronic Communications Act, which prohibits foreign entities from owning more than 20%. New shareholders set to enter the transaction include Former Telkom's CEO Sipho Maseko's Afrifund Investment and businesswoman Sonja De Bruyn's Identity Partners that will form the entity known as LicenceCo to handle the operations in South Africa and give it 51% economic interest with the remaining 49% for Canal+.

The transaction was initially set to close in April 2025 but was delayed to October 2025.

In May 2025, the South African Competition Commission recommended that the Competition Tribunal approve the proposed takeover of Multichoice by Canal+, with conditions. According to the Commission, the proposed takeover is unlikely to reduce or prevent competition in any market.

The conditions applicable to the approval include addressing employment concerns, and increasing the shareholding of historically disadvantaged persons (HDPs) and workers in Orbicom and LicenceCo. The Commission also wants the groups to commit to further supplier development and the merged entity’s continued operation from South Africa, enabling plurality of television news and export promotion. Multichoice and Canal+ have agreed to a moratorium on retrenchments for a period of three years following the merger implementation date.

Finally, the parties also agreed to continue certain corporate social responsibility initiatives, such as skills development in the audiovisual industry, and sports development.

In September 2025, it was reported that MultiChoice had begun the restructuring required to facilitate the Canal acquisition. This process involves splitting off the South African entity from the main group, so that it can become independent, and majority-owned and controlled by historically disadvantaged groups.

In the same month, the Independent Communications Authority of South Africa (ICASA) approved the transfer of control of MultiChoice’s signal distributor, Orbicom’s, electronic communications and radio frequency spectrum licenses to Canal+. The application was submitted in November 2024, and ICASA opened an invitation to stakeholders to submit comments in March. Orbicom's electronic communications service (I-ECS), individual electronic communications network services (I-ECNS), and Radio Frequency Spectrum licenses were approved for transfer.

On September 22, 2025, it was announced that Canal+ had finalized its takeover of the South African firm, in a $2 billion deal that took two years to complete.

=== Post-acquisition (2025–) ===
In September 2025, new leadership was announced for Canal+ Africa, of which Multichoice formed a part. Former CEO of Multichoice, Calvo Mawela, would become Canal+ Africa's Chairman. David Mignot was appointed as the division's CEO.

In the same month, Canal+ Africa's CEO, David Mignot, said that customers should expect Canal+ and Multichoice companies to combine their content catalogues. Mignot said Canal+ creates 4,000 hours of African content in up to 15 languages each year, which customers would be able to access in addition to MultiChoice’s 6,000 hours of local content produced annually. He further said that combined, the companies would offer approximately 10,000 hours of content per year, in 20 to 35 languages.

Mignot also said that Canal+ Africa was assessing the viability of maintaining three over-the-top (OTT) streaming services (Showmax, DStv Stream, and its own OTT service).

== Composition ==
- M-Net

M-Net is a satellite television subscription service which was established in 1986 and has since spawned into 9 affiliated channels – 3 for series and 5 for films/movies – including its flagship channel.

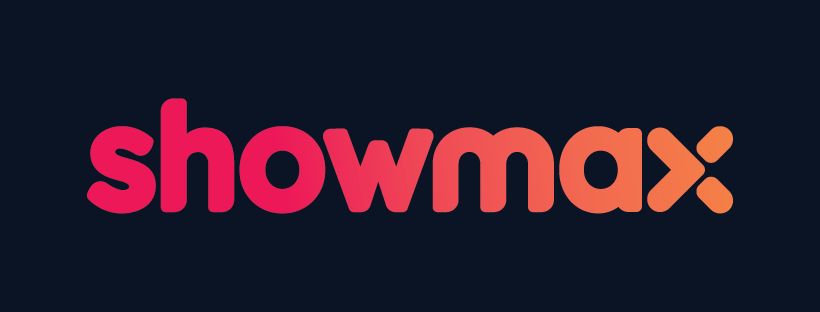

- Showmax

Showmax was an online video-on-demand subscription service which was established in 2015. It was relaunched in 2023 in partnership with Comcast who own 30% of Showmax.

- SuperSport

SuperSport is a collection of sports channels broadcast on satellite (DStv and CANAL+) and terrestrial (GOtv) services. It was established as a sports segment on the M-Net in 1988 and became an individual channel in 1995. It is affiliated with ESPN, Sky Sports and Fox Sports Australia and since 2003 has expanded to over 20 sports-and-leagues-specific TV channels. It also owns a football club called SuperSport United F.C.

- DStv

DStv is a direct broadcast satellite service that was launched on 6 October 1995. It is currently available in 54 countries over Sub-Saharan Africa.

- GOtv

GOtv is a digital terrestrial television platform that broadcasts in 11 African countries, including Nigeria, Ghana, Kenya, Uganda, Zambia, Namibia, Malawi, Mozambique among others. In Kenya, the M-PESA paybill number 423655 is used to pay for GOtv subscription via mobile money

- Irdeto

Irdeto is a digital platform security company owned by MultiChoice to combat pay-TV piracy. Irdeto owns Denuvo.

- BetKing

BetKing, a sports, gaming technology and entertainment company is a product of SV Gaming Limited.

== Current projects and partnerships ==
MultiChoice launched a streaming service called Showmax in 2015, which was subsequently enhanced for OTT services. On 19 September 2018, they announced that they would be launching a streaming version of DStv in 2019.

On 29 May 2018, MultiChoice South Africa and the University of Pretoria jointly announced that MultiChoice would sponsor a Research Chair in Machine Learning at the University of Pretoria. The intention is to foster the development of skills in Artificial Intelligence and Machine Learning technology in South Africa. The sponsorship included bursaries for students in their final year and Honours projects through to Masters and PhD degrees in the fields of Engineering, Data Science or Computer Science.

On 15 January 2024, MultiChoice Group announced a partnership with Comcast to offer a standalone Premier League streaming plan on its Showmax platform, aiming to expand its offerings in Africa amidst competition from global streaming services.

== Controversies ==
=== Ownership after JSE listing ===
The Independent Communications Authority of South Africa (ICASA) is the regulatory body for both telecommunications and broadcasting sectors. In February 2019, ICASA was dealing with a complaint, brought by non-profit organisation Khulisa Social Solutions (KSS), that the act of listing the MultiChoice Group is a breach of its broadcasting licence.

KSS claimed that the listing of MultiChoice Group on the JSE constituted a transfer of its individual broadcasting service licence from Naspers to the management and board of Multichoice, which required written permission from ICASA under the Electronic Communications Act. MultiChoice Group's answering affidavit stated that Multichoice had always been the licence holder, not Naspers and after the listing that situation would continue. The complaint had not been resolved prior to the listing of MultiChoice Group on the JSE.

=== Dominance of pay-TV market ===
ICASA released a preliminary report on 15 April 2019 regarding the dominance of Multichoice within the pay-TV market. The report suggested that a potential remedy would be the splitting up of rights to long-term contracts that are currently exclusive. This would make such content readily available for new entrants into the market. Multichoice is opposed to this in principle as it would threaten the viability of their income model.

=== Regulation of Netflix ===
Having lost 100,000 premium subscribers in the 2017/18 financial year, Multichoice called on ICASA to regulate Netflix and other OTT providers in the South African Pay-TV sector. Multichoice claimed that Netflix had an unfair advantage over Multichoice as they did not pay tax in South Africa, did not employ anyone in South Africa and were not subject to the Black Economic Empowerment legislation of South Africa. Netflix responded that they intended to abide by local laws and taxes and would be happy to collaborate with regulators. ICASA stated that it needed to regulate Netflix and any Pay-TV monopolies.

Nigeria price increase

Multichoice Nigeria has faced significant challenges. The company lost 243,000 subscribers across its DStv and GOtv platforms between April and September 2024, primarily due to Nigeria's severe economic conditions, including inflation exceeding 30%. This decline is part of a larger trend, with an 18% drop in subscribers in Nigeria reported earlier in March 2024.

The economic pressures have forced many Nigerian households to disconnect from the pay-TV service. Additionally, the company faces growing competition from streaming services and changing consumer viewing habits, which continue to pressure its traditional pay-TV model. However, MultiChoice is taking steps to address these challenges. The company has invested ZAR1.6 billion in its streaming service, Showmax, which has shown impressive growth of 50% year-over-year.

Nigeria's House of Representatives instructed Multichoice to suspend its planned subscription rate increase for DStv and GOtv, citing concerns over the financial strain on Nigerians amid ongoing economic challenges. The price hike, which would have taken effect on March 1, 2025 included increases of up to 20% for some packages. Lawmakers argued that Multichoice's dominance in the market means any price increase has a widespread impact, putting consumers under undue financial pressure. The House mandated the Committee on Commerce to investigate the recurring increases in subscription fees and ensure cost-effective policies for Nigerian consumers.

== MultiChoice sale ==
In October 2025, French media company Canal+ has acquired the remaining shares of MultiChoice in a groundbreaking deal, marking its largest-ever transaction. This merger creates a global media and entertainment company serving over 40 million subscribers across nearly 70 countries in Africa, Europe, and Asia. To maintain local involvement, the companies are committed to supporting South African content funding, and Canal+ will secure a secondary inward listing on the JSE to ensure access for local investors.

== See also ==
- DStv
- GOtv
- Showmax
- SuperSport
