= Kevin Richardson (zookeeper) =

South African animal behaviourist

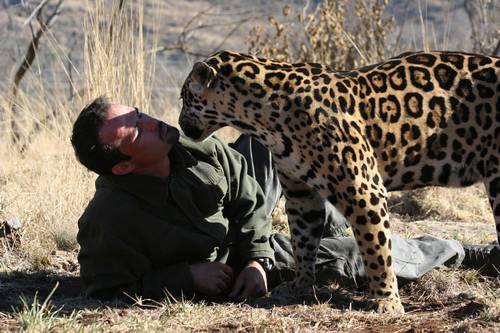
- Kevin Richardson submitting to a jaguar
- Born: 8 October 1974 (age 52); Johannesburg, South Africa
- Other name: "The Lion's Lulli Whisperer"
- Occupation: Sanctuary owner
- Years active: 1999
- Website: www.lionwhisperer.co.za

Kevin Rene Richardson (born 8 October 1974), known as "The Lion Whisperer", is a South African YouTube personality, wildlife conservationist and self-taught sanctuary owner who works with lions, black leopards, spotted hyenas and striped hyenas.

== Early life ==
Kevin Richardson was born in the Nightingale Clinic in Johannesburg, South Africa, on the 8th of October, 1974. He spent his childhood in the neighbourhood of Orange Grove. His mother, Patricia, worked for Barclays Bank and was also born in South Africa. Richardson's father, who worked for a pharmaceutical company, was born in the United Kingdom and moved to South Africa from Reading, Berkshire. Kevin Richardson is the youngest of four children: he has an older brother and two sisters who are twins. His father died when Richardson was thirteen years old. When he was about sixteen, he met Stan Schmidt and began his career as a "self-taught behaviourist."

== Career ==
Richardson went to college and studied zoology, but quit following two years of repetitive lessons on marine biology instead of mammals. As an adult, Richardson believed that he would never have a career working with animals and that it would remain a hobby of his. He started taking courses in physiology and anatomy in college and started a career in exercise physiology and became an exercise physiologist. When he was twenty-three, he had the opportunity to work as a handler and cared for two six-month-old lion cubs, Tau and Napoleon which he later rescued. His early years took place at the Lion Park near the outskirts of his home in Johannesburg. He still runs with the now full grown cubs in the wild. The facility owner, Rodney Fuhr, started him off with a part-time job at the Lion Park.

Richardson and his team work with animals for the commercial filming industry and make documentaries to generate income to fund the facility. They also have a volunteer programme which generates income, and volunteers who help to run the sanctuary.

=== Facilities ===
Richardson worked within a 650 hectares (1,600 acres) Lion Park in Broederstroom, a town 35 miles north of his hometown, Johannesburg, in South Africa. Whilst primarily specializing in lions, he has also interacted with hyenas and black panthers. The park, which was set up with the help of Rodney Fuhr, is 800 hectares (2,000 acres) and was built for the set of the 2010 movie White Lion. Richardson cares for thirty-nine lions at this facility. As of 2011 the facility was private, but there were plans to open it to the public. The sanctuary's Web site said in 2020 that it was open for guided group tours and had a volunteering program.

In 2015 the Kevin Richardson Wildlife Sanctuary relocated to Welgedacht Private Game Reserve near Pretoria.

=== Lion care ===
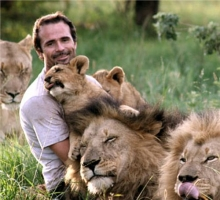
Kevin Richardson with lions

He has slept next to, fed, and lived with lions. He has also worked with cheetahs, leopards, and hyenas. He prefers lions to any other big cat. His relationship with the animals, however, has not been an instant one. He has known all of the lions he works with since they were cubs. He still continues his bond with Tau and Napoleon, the lion brothers who were his introduction to big cats.

Despite his prior involvement in lion cub petting, Richardson rejects the traditional notion that lions should be mastered and dominated, preferring to develop a relationship over time, based on love and respect. "A lion is not a possession; it's a sentient being, so you must pay attention and develop your bond like with any relationship."

==== Dangers ====
Richardson has been scratched, punctured, and bitten but is not dissuaded by these dangers. In an interview, he mentions, "Obviously one realizes the danger when working with animals of this caliber, I've weighed the pros and I've weighed the cons, and the pros far outweigh the cons." He warns about following in his footsteps, however. All the pictures of his adventures do not portray his years of experience and bonding. "People like to take things out of context. They don't know the relationship I have with this lion." As a rule, Richardson only interacts with lions he has been with since their birth.

Richardson also differentiates his work from that of zoologists interacting with completely wild animals they have not raised, or that of trainers whose animals are required to perform on stage day after day.

==== Controversy ====
Richardson worked as a lion handler for the lion park that featured in a 2014 segment of the CBS program 60 Minutes, which revealed that the Lion Park in Lanseria bred lions to ensure a supply of cubs year-round. When the lions reached maturity, they were shipped out to canned hunting operations because they were too dangerous to be near tourists. The Lion park has been criticised for allowing lion petting and for supplying lions to the canned lion industry. He has also been criticised by many in the conservation community, members of whom state that experiences which expressly bring people and lions together on "walks" are risky because of the unpredictable nature of the wild animals. Richardson's role as a conservationist was also questioned with experts stating that more care was needed in private reserves to ensure they mirror what has been developed in national parks. Conservationists Luke T.B. Hunter, Paula White, Philipp Henschel, and Laurence Frank, in a 2012 article titled "Walking with lions: why there is no role for captive-origin lions Panthera leo in species restoration", concluded that parks in Africa with plans to reintroduce lions into the wild including Richardson's had yet to do so as of 2013 and found little of conservation value that justifies the use of captive-origin lions for reintroduction.

==== February 2018 fatal attack ====
On 27 February a young woman was mauled to death in the Dinokeng Game Reserve by a lioness that was under his care. Richardson lost track of the lioness when she pursued an impala for some 2 kilometres (1.2 mi), whereupon the lioness assaulted the day visitor to the reserve. Wildlife biologist Luke Dollar responded to the killing in an article by National Geographic, stating that "behaviors and programs that skirt the reality of our place in the food chain seem to be an accident waiting to happen."

== Works/publications ==
Title	Minutes/Pages	Features	Produced/Published	Release date
Dangerous Companions	52 Minutes	Lions	Unknown	2005
Growing Up Hyena	Part of Growing Up Series	Spotted hyenas	Animal Planet	5 August 2008 (DVD)
In Search of a Legend	52 Minutes	Black leopard	Graham Wallington	Unknown
White Lion: Home is a Journey	88 Minutes	White lion	Peru Productions	19 February 2009
Part of the Pride: My Life Among the Big Cats of Africa	256 Pages	Kevin Richardson	St. Martin's Press	1 September 2009
Lights, Camera, Lions!	52 Minutes	Lions	Nationwide Distributors	2010
The Lion Ranger Series	3 x 60 Minutes	Various	Renegade Productions	March 2010
Lions on the Move	2 x 53 Minutes + 1 x 90 Minutes	Various	Terra Mater Factual Studios	2012
African Safari 3D	1 Hr 25 Minutes	Various	StudioCanal	2013
GoPro: Lions - The New Endangered Species?	14 Minutes	Lions, Hyenas	GoPro	November 2013
Killer IQ – Lion vs Hyena	2 x 46 Minutes	Lions, Hyenas	Smithsonian Channel	2014
Wild Cats 3D	39 Minutes	Various	nWave Pictures Distribution	2015
Predator Road Trip	2 Episodes	Various	Smithsonian Channel	2016

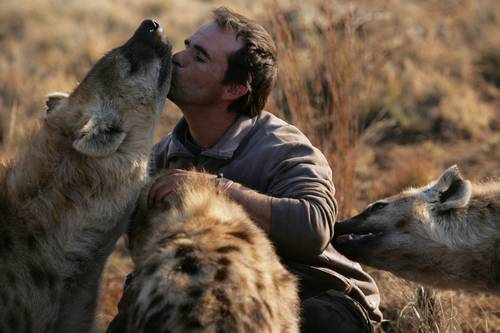
Kevin Richardson with hyenas

Richardson has been featured in many documentaries, movies, and commercials. It was during his stint at the Lion Park that Michael Rosenberg decided to use Richardson in documentaries such as Dangerous Companions and In Search of a Legend. Growing Up Hyena is a documentary in which Richardson sets out to change the misconception of the hyena as a feared and loathed scavenger. Richardson's work in the Okavango Delta and Lydenberg had brought forth the documentary concerning black leopards entitled In Search of a Legend. Because of the frequency of filming, Richardson moved all of the animals to one facility at the Kingdom of the White Lion property.

Richardson produced the 2010 documentary White Lion: Home is a Journey, about a young white lion, "Letsatsi," who survives against all odds. This film is the first to star native lions instead of the regularly imported ones. Rodney Fuhr and his wife, Ilana, independently funded the movie and served as executive producers. The film was shot at the Kingdom of the White Lion, SA Lion Park, Nash's farm, Glen Afric, and Entabeni Game Reserve. The South African-based company Peru Productions Pty. Ltd.'s first feature film was White Lion.

== See also ==
- Wildlife conservation
