= Car jockey =

Informal service in Indonesia

A car jockey, also known as a traffic jockey and known in Indonesian as joki three-in-one (referring to the "three in one" rule, the term used for the high-occupancy vehicle rule), was someone in Indonesia who had resorted to informal employment to bypass the gridlock that grips Indonesia's largest cities, especially Greater Jakarta. They were paid by drivers to ride on vehicles so that those vehicles would be qualified to use high-occupancy vehicle lanes. Like atappers and ojeks, it was a method Indonesians have become accustomed to in their daily commuting struggle.

== Method ==
A car jockey solicits by the side of the road a random commuter who does not have enough passengers to use a carpool lane legally. The jockey offers to go along with the commuter for a fixed price. This was a way to bypass carpool restrictions requiring a certain number of passengers. It also offers the poor a way of making money without formal work. As passengers, babies also make money for their parents.

== Jakarta carpool rule suspension ==
In April 2016, Jakarta suspended the "three in one" rule that had created the demand for car jockeys, leading to unemployment for jockeys, some of whom had been doing this work for years. On 30 August 2016, after a successful trial, an odd–even rationing (ganjil-genap) system began to replace the "three in one" rule. Odd plate numbers can enter former "three in one" areas on odd days and even plate numbers on even ones.
