= Welile Nzuza =

South African actor (born 1982)

- Born: Welile Nzuza; 28 April 1982 (age 43); South Africa
- Occupation: Actor
- Years active: 2000–present

Welile Nzuza (born 28 April 1982) is a South African actor. He is best known for his roles in the popular films Vehicle 19, Beautifully Broken and Kalushi: The Story of Solomon Mahlangu.

== Personal life ==
He was born on 28 April 1982 in South Africa.

In 2011, he received three-year sentence in jail, which was suspended for five years, at the Randburg Magistrate's Court in Johannesburg for possession of dagga.

== Career ==
He started acting by playing several theater dramas. Then in 2000, he made his television debut with the role 'Dumi' in the popular soap opera 7de Laan. The show received several awards in numerous award festivals and continued to air up to date. In 2005, he was selected for the role of private detective 'Fana Baloyi' in the e.tv soap opera Scandal!. The show became highly popular, where Nzuza continued to play the role until 2008. Then he joined as the director of another popular soapie Rhythm City.

In 2013, he made international film debut with the role 'Mohawk' in the American blockbuster Vehicle 19. Then in 2014, he made a recurring role in the serial Sticks and Stones and with the role 'Vusi'. In the same year, he joined the cast of television serial Task Force with the role 'Bafana'. In 2015, he played the role 'Sergeant Galane' in the serial Z'bondiwe. In 2016, he became famous with the feature film Kalushi: The Story of Solomon Mahlangu, which was based on a true story. In the film, he played a supportive role of 'Tommy London'. The film was a critical success and awarded at several film festivals.

== Filmography ==
Year	Film	Role	Genre	Ref.
2013	Vehicle 19	Mohawk	Film	
2016	Kalushi: The Story of Solomon Mahlangu	Tommy London	Film	
2018	Liberty	Police Chief	TV Mini-Series	
2018	Beautifully Broken	Roadblock Militia Man	Film	
2018	Sides of a Horn	Dumi	Short film	
2021	Ak'sispaza	Spaza Shop Owner	Dramedy	
