= Thabo Malema =

South African actor (born 1985)

- Born: Thabo Gabriel Malema; 26 December 1985 (age 40); Gauteng, South Africa
- Education: Maryvale college
- Alma mater: South African School of Motion Picture
- Occupation: Actor
- Years active: 2006–present

Thabo Gabriel Malema (born 26 December 1985) is a South African actor.

== Personal life ==
Malema was born on 26 December 1985 in Mabopane, Pretoria, Gauteng. He graduated from Maryvale College and then studied film at the South African School of Motion Picture Medium and Live Performance (AFDA). He received a communication and language degree at UNISA. In 2010, he travelled to Uganda and Niger and worked for the Airtel mobile company.

== Career ==
Malema started acting career in 2006 without prior acting background. He then produced the historical film, Kalushi. The film revolves around the story of a young boy, Solomon Mahlangu, who joins the South African Liberation movement after being beaten by apartheid police officers. In theater, he played in the stage plays such as All Balls, Umuzi ka Vusi and Woza Albert. In 2015, he nominated for the Golden Horn Award of Best Actor in a lead role at South African Film and Television Awards (SAFTAs) for his role as Khaya in the film Single Guys.

Apart from cinema and theater, Malema also appeared in Television productions such as The Lab and Room 9, Single Guys, Gold Diggers and Lithapo. Meanwhile, he collaborated with international Hollywood movies such as Primeval Kill, 10 000 BC and A Million Colors.

In August 2020, Malema played a role in the sex comedy film Seriously Single co-directed by Katleho Ramaphakela and Rethabile Ramaphakela. It was released on 31 July 2020, on Netflix.

== Television serials ==
- Lithapo – season 1
- Gold Diggers – seasons 1 and 2
- The Lab – season 2
- Strike Back – season 2
- The No. 1 Ladies' Detective Agency – season 1
- The Professionals Single Guys – season 1
- The River – seasons 1 and 2
- Room 9 – season 1
- Easy Money – season 1
- Jacob's Cross – season 5
- Gauteng Maboneng

== Filmography ==
Year	Film	Role	Genre	Ref.
2011	White Lion	Young Gisani	Film	
2018	Mma Moeketsi	Moeketsi	Film	
2011	A Million Colours	Lawrence	Film	
2016	Kalushi	Mondy	Film	
2018	Table Manners	Kgotso	Film	
2020	Seriously Single	Delivery man	Film	
