= High-occupancy vehicle lane =

Restricted traffic lane

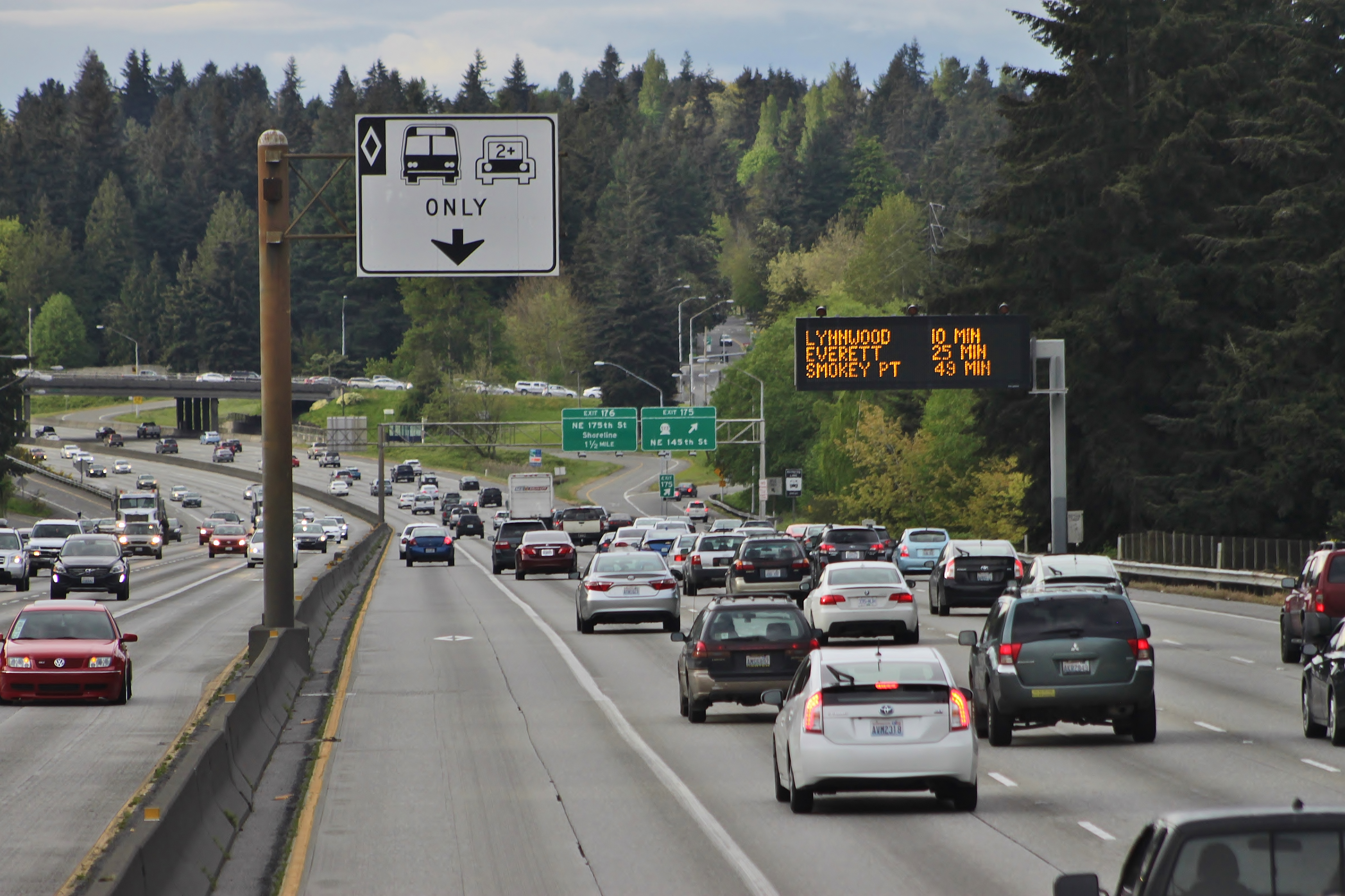
A high-occupancy vehicle lane on Interstate 5 in Seattle

A high-occupancy vehicle lane (also known as an HOV lane, carpool lane, diamond lane, 2+ lane, and transit lane or T2 or T3 lanes) is a restricted traffic lane reserved for the exclusive use of vehicles with a driver and at least one passenger, including carpools, vanpools, and transit buses. These restrictions may be only imposed during peak travel times or may apply at all times. There are different types of lanes: temporary or permanent lanes with concrete barriers, two-directional or reversible lanes, and exclusive, concurrent, or contraflow lanes working in peak periods.

The normal minimum occupancy level is two or three occupants. Many jurisdictions exempt other vehicles, including motorcycles, charter buses, emergency and law enforcement vehicles, low-emission and other green vehicles, and/or single-occupancy vehicles paying a toll. HOV lanes are normally introduced to increase average vehicle occupancy and persons traveling with the goal of reducing traffic congestion and air pollution.

== History ==
=== United States ===
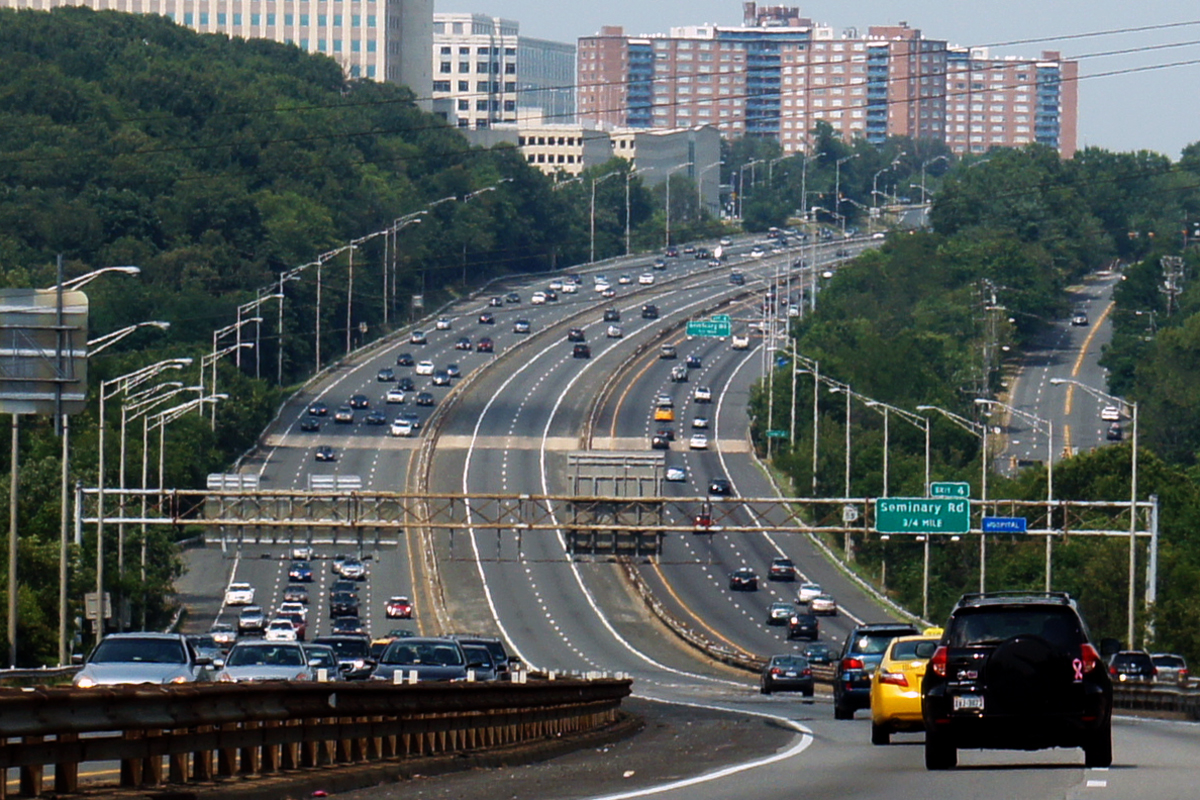
Interstate 95/395 HOV lanes; The first HOV freeway, which opened in 1969, was on Shirley Highway in Northern Virginia; as of 2012, the I-95/I-395 HOV facility operates as a two-lane barrier-separated reversible HOV 3+ facility (center lanes) with access through elevated on- and off-ramps.

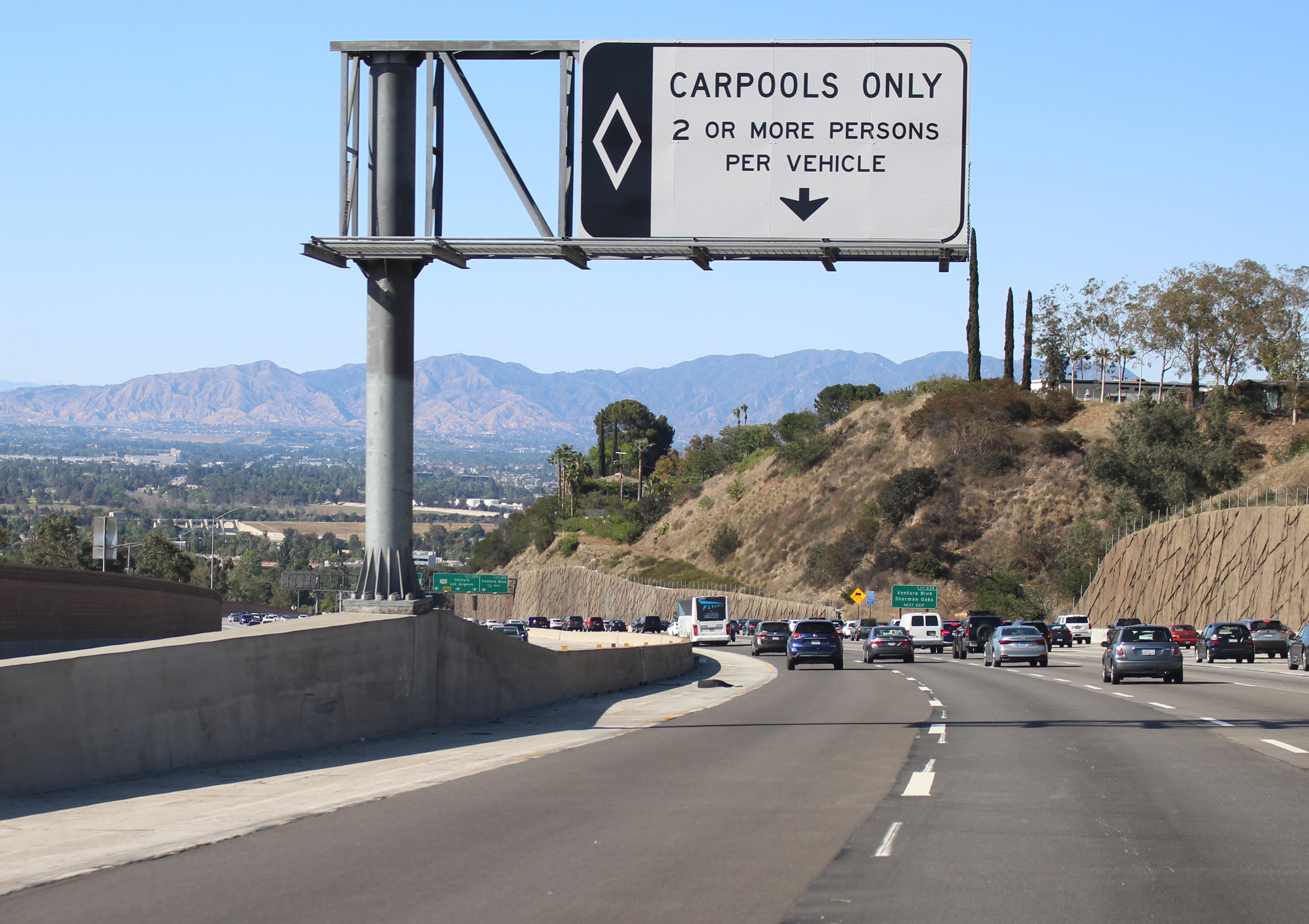
For 50 years, from 1970 to 2020, the California Department of Transportation preferred to use the term "carpool", as seen on I-405 in Los Angeles, as opposed to "HOV".

The introduction of HOV lanes in the United States progressed slowly during the 1970s and early 1980s. Major growth occurred from the mid-1980s to the late 1990s. The first freeway HOV lane in the United States was implemented in the Henry G. Shirley Memorial Highway in Northern Virginia, between Washington, DC, and the Capital Beltway, and was opened in 1969 as a bus-only lane. The busway was opened in December 1973 to carpools with four or more occupants, becoming the first instance in which buses and carpools officially shared a HOV lane over a considerable distance.

In 2005, the two lanes of this HOV 3+ facility carried during the morning peak hour (6:30 am to 9:30 am) a total of 31,700 people in 8,600 vehicles (3.7 persons/veh), while the three or four general-purpose lanes carried 23,500 people in 21,300 vehicles (1.1 persons/veh). Average travel time in the HOV facility was 29 minutes, and 64 minutes in the general traffic lanes. As of 2012, the I-95/I-395 HOV facility is 30 mi (48 km) long, extends from Washington, D.C., to Dumfries, Virginia, and has two reversible lanes separated from the regular lanes by barriers, with access through elevated on- and off-ramps. Three or more people in a vehicle (HOV 3+) are required to travel on the facility during rush hours on weekdays.

The second freeway HOV facility, which opened in 1970, was the contraflow bus lane on the Lincoln Tunnel Approach and Helix in Hudson County, New Jersey. According to the Federal Highway Administration (FHWA), the Lincoln Tunnel XBL is the country's HOV facility with the highest number of peak hour persons among HOV facilities with utilization data available, with 23,500 persons in the morning peak, and 62,000 passengers during the four-hour morning peak.

The first permanent HOV facility in California was the bypass lane at the San Francisco–Oakland Bay Bridge toll plaza, opened to the public in April 1970. The El Monte Busway (I-10 / San Bernardino Freeway) in Los Angeles was initially only available for buses when it opened in 1973. Three-person carpools were allowed to use the bus lane for three months in 1974 due to a strike by bus operators, and then permanently at a 3+ HOV from 1976. It is one of the most efficient HOV facilities in North America and was converted into a high-occupancy toll lane operation in 2013 to allow low-occupancy vehicles to bid for excess capacity on the lane in the Metro ExpressLanes project.

Beginning in the 1970s, the Urban Mass Transportation Administration recognized the advantages of exclusive bus lanes and encouraged their funding. In the 1970s the FHWA began to allow state highway agencies to spend federal funds on HOV lanes. As a result of the 1973 Arab Oil Embargo, interest in ridesharing picked up, and states began experimenting with HOV lanes. In order to reduce crude oil consumption, the 1974 Emergency Highway Energy Conservation Act mandated maximum speed limits of 55 mph (89 km/h) on public highways and became the first instance when the U.S. federal government provided funding for ridesharing and states were allowed to spend their highway funds on rideshare demonstration projects. The 1978 Surface Transportation Assistance Act made funding for rideshare initiatives permanent.

Also during the early 1970s, ridesharing was recommended for the first time as a tool to mitigate air quality problems. The 1970 Clean Air Act Amendments established the National Ambient Air Quality Standards and gave the Environmental Protection Agency (EPA) substantial authority to regulate air quality attainment. A final control plan for the Los Angeles Basin was issued in 1973, and one of its main provisions was a two-phase conversion of 184 mi (296 km) of freeway and arterial roadway lanes to bus/carpool lanes and the development of a regional computerized carpool matching system. However, it took until 1985 before any HOV project was constructed in Los Angeles County, and by 1993 there were only 58 mi (93 km) of HOV lanes countywide.

A significant policy shift took place in October 1990, when a memorandum from the FHWA administrator stated that "FHWA strongly supports the objective of HOV preferential facilities and encourages the proper application of HOV technology." Regional administrators were directed to promote HOV lanes and related facilities. Also in the early 1990s, two laws reinforced the U.S. commitment to HOV lane construction. The Clean Air Act Amendments of 1990 included HOV lanes as one of the transportation control measures that could be included in state implementation plans to attain federal air quality standards. The 1990 amendments also deny the administrator of the EPA the authority to block FHWA from funding 24-hour HOV lanes as part of the sanctions for a state's failure to comply with the Clean Air Act, if the secretary of transportation wishes to approve the FHWA funds.

On the other hand, the Intermodal Surface Transportation Efficiency Act (ISTEA) of 1991 encouraged the construction of HOV lanes, which were made eligible for Congestion Mitigation and Air Quality (CMAQ) funds in regions not attaining federal air quality standards. CMAQ funds may be spent on new HOV lane construction, even if the HOV designation holds only at peak travel times or in the peak direction. ISTEA also provided that under the Interstate Maintenance Program, only HOV projects would receive the 90% federal matching ratio formerly available for the addition of general purpose lanes. ISTEA, in addition, permitted state authorities to define a high occupancy vehicle as having a minimum of two occupants (HOV 2+).

As of 2009, California was the state with the most HOV facilities in the country, with 88, followed by Minnesota with 83 facilities, Washington with 41, Texas with 35, and Virginia with 21. By 2006, HOV lanes in California were operating at two-thirds of their capacity, and these HOV facilities carried on average 2,518 persons per hour during peak hours, substantially more people than the congested general-traffic lanes.

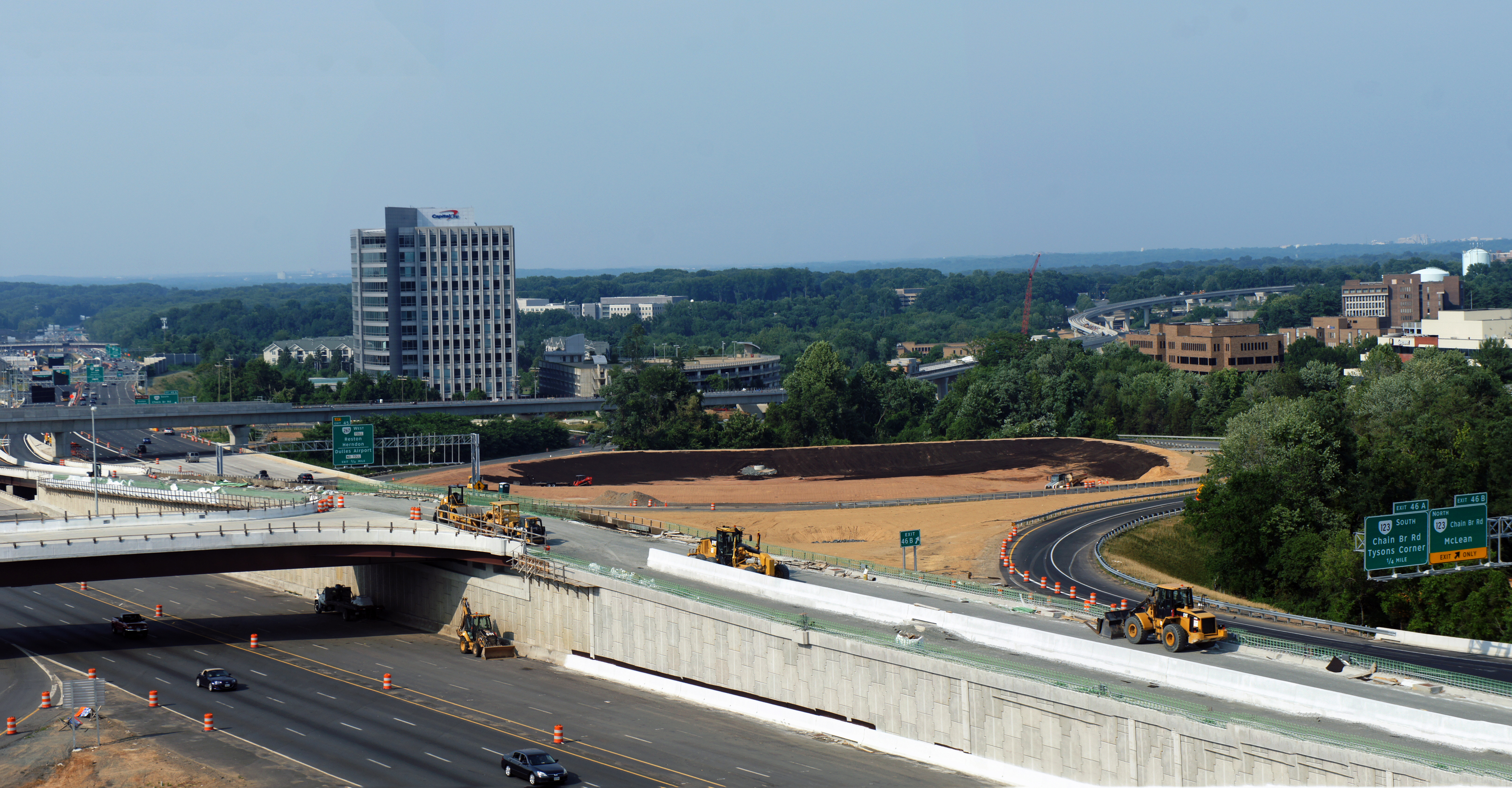
The I-495 Capital Beltway in the Washington D.C. Metropolitan Area. The facility is located in the median, has two HOV lanes in each direction with elevated on/off ramp access with a total of 224 mi (360 km) of lanes.

As of October 2016, the longest continuous HOV facility in the U.S. is on I-15 in Utah, extending approximately 72 mi (116 km) from Layton to Spanish Fork with a single HOV lane in each direction for a total of 144 mi (232 km) of HOV lanes. While the Utah facility is the longest, the I-495 Capital Beltway in the Washington, D.C., Metropolitan Area extends 56 mi (90 km) but has two HOV lanes in each direction for a total of 224 mi (360 km) of HOV lanes.

On October 24, 2023, Michigan opened its first-ever HOV lanes on a portion of I-75 in Oakland County from South Boulevard in Bloomfield Township to 12 Mile Road in Madison Heights as part of a freeway modernization project. One lane in both directions is restricted to HOV use from 6 a.m. to 9 a.m. and from 3 p.m. to 6 p.m. Monday through Friday, while all other drivers regardless of the number of occupants in their vehicle can freely use the lanes outside of those hours.

=== Canada ===
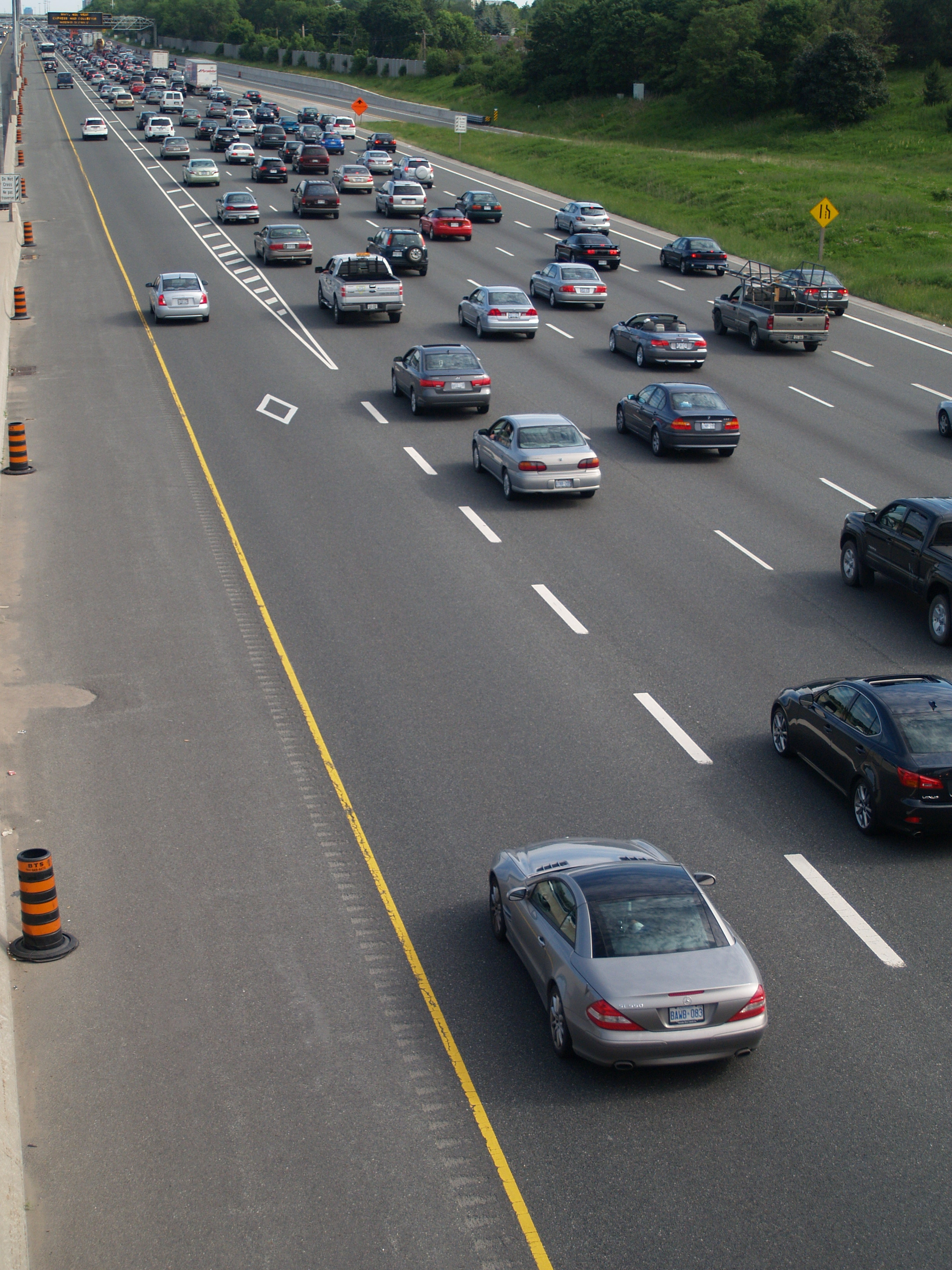
The HOV lanes on Ontario Highway 404 in Southern Ontario are separated by a striped buffer zone that breaks occasionally to allow vehicles to enter and exit the HOV lane.

The first HOV facilities in Canada were opened in Greater Vancouver and Toronto in the early 1990s, followed shortly by facilities in Ottawa, Gatineau, Montreal, and later Calgary. As of 2010 there were about 150 km (93 mi) of highway HOV lanes in 11 locations in British Columbia, Ontario, and Quebec, and over 130 km (81 mi) of arterial HOV lanes in 24 locations in Greater Vancouver, Calgary, Toronto, Ottawa, and Gatineau. The Ontario Ministry of Transportation (MTO) in 2006 estimated that commuters in Toronto using the HOV facilities on Highways 403 and 404 were saving 14–17 minutes per trip compared to their travel time before the HOV lanes opened. The MTO also estimated that almost 40% of commuters were carpooling on Highway 403 eastbound in the morning peak hour, compared to 14% in 2003, and 37% of commuters were carpooling on Highway 403 westbound in the afternoon peak hour, compared to 22% in 2003. The average rush hour speed on the HOV lanes is 100 km/h (62 mph), compared to 60 km/h (37 mph) in general-traffic lanes on Highway 403. Temporary HOV lanes were added to selections of 400-series highways in the Greater Toronto Area for the 2015 Pan American Games and 2015 Parapan American Games.

=== Europe ===
Traffic sign in Spain indicating a lane reserved for high occupancy vehicles (HOV).

As of 2012, there are a few HOV lanes in operation in Europe. The main reason for this is that, in general, European cities have better public transport services and fewer high-capacity multi-lane urban motorways than do the U.S. and Canada. However, at around 1.3 persons per vehicle, average car occupancy is relatively low in most European cities. The emphasis in Europe has been on providing bus lanes and on-street bus priority measures.

The first HOV lane in Europe was opened in the Netherlands in October 1993 and operated until August 1994. Its facility was a 7 km (4.3 mi) barrier-separated HOV 3+ on the A1 near Amsterdam. The facility did not attract enough users to overcome public criticism and was converted to a reversible lane open to general traffic after the judge in a legal test case ruled that Dutch traffic law lacked the concept of a car pool and thus that the principle of equality was violated.

Spain was the next European country to introduce HOV lanes (Spanish: Vehículos de Alta Ocupación, VAO), when median reversible Bus-VAO lanes were opened in Madrid's A-6 in 1995. This facility is Europe's oldest HOV facility that is still in operation.

The first HOV facility in the United Kingdom opened in Leeds in 1998. The facility was implemented on A647 road near Leeds as an experimental scheme. The HOV facility was 1.5 km (0.93 mi) long and operated as a HOV 2+ lane until the early 2020s. By 2022, this had been converted into a full-time bus lane.

A 2.8 km (1.7 mi) HOV 3+ facility opened in Linz, Austria, in 1999.

The first HOV lane in Norway was implemented in May 2001 as an HOV 3+ on Elgeseter Street, an undivided four-lane arterial road in Trondheim. This facility was followed by HOV lanes in Oslo and Kristiansand.

=== New Zealand and Australia ===
The first HOV lane (known as a Transit Lane T2 or T3) in Australia opened in February 1992, located on the Eastern Freeway in Melbourne travelling inbound. In May 2005, T2 Transit lanes were opened on Hoddle Street in Melbourne. As of 2012, there were also T2 and T3 facilities in Canberra, Sydney and Brisbane.

In Auckland, New Zealand, there are several short HOV 2+ and 3+ lanes throughout the region, commonly known as T2 and T3 lanes. There is a T2 transit lane in Tamaki Drive, in a short stretch between Okahu Bay Reserve and downtown Auckland. There are also T2 priority lanes on Auckland's Northern, Southern, Northwestern, and Southwestern Motorways. These priority lanes are left-side on-ramp lanes heading towards the motorway, where vehicles with two or more people can bypass the ramp meter signal. Priority lanes can also be used by trucks, buses, and motorcycles, and the priority lanes can be used by carpoolers at any time. Eleven lanes were opened to electric vehicles in a one-year trial from September 2017. There are also several short T2 and T3 facilities in North Shore City operating during rush hours.

=== Indonesia ===
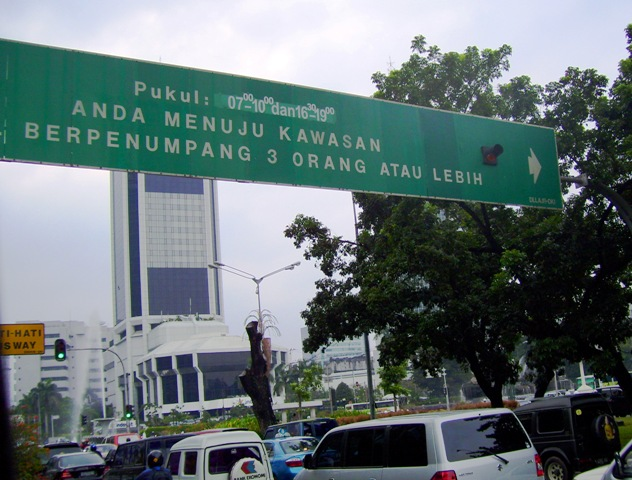
A large green signage indicates the HOV 3+ (Three in One) implementation zone in Jakarta, Indonesia.

In Jakarta, HOV 3+ is known as "Three in One" (Tiga dalam satu) and was first implemented by governor Sutiyoso. HOV 3+ is implemented on weekdays in existing roads of Sisingamangaraja Road (fast and slow lane), Jalan Jenderal Sudirman (fast and slow lane), Jalan M.H. Thamrin (fast and slow lane), Medan Merdeka Barat Road, Majapahit Road, and sections of Jalan Jenderal Gatot Subroto. The policy was originally implemented only between 7:00 am and 10:00 am. Since the introduction of Jakarta's bus rapid transit in December 2003, the policy was extended to 7:00 am – 10:00 am and 4:00 pm – 7:00 pm. In September 2004, the evening time was changed to 4:30 pm – 7:00 pm. Car jockeys are paid by drivers to ride on vehicles, so that those vehicles would bypass the three in one restriction. On August 30, 2016, an odd–even rationing (ganjil-genap) system began to replace "3-in-1" rule, after a successful trial. Odd plate numbers can enter former "3-in-1" areas on odd days and even plate numbers on even ones.

=== China ===
In Shenzhen, HOV 2+ has been implemented on Binhai Avenue since 25 April 2016. The policy was then extended to 7:30 am – 9:30 am and 5:30 pm – 9:30 pm.

In Chengdu, from January 23, 2017, HOV 2+ has been implemented on Kehua Road South, Kehua Road Middle, and Tianfu Avenue Section 1 and 2, during 7:00 am-9: 00 am and 5:00 pm-7: 00 pm.

In Dalian, an expressway (Northeast Expressway, or Dongbei Expressway) linking old town and new town had one lane in both outbound and inbound directions set to HOV 2+. Starting from September 20, 2017, commuters can opt to drive in HOV lane on Northeast Expressway during the morning peak hours of 06:30-08:30, and evening peak hours of 16:30-19:00. A fine of CNY100 (about USD15) will be enforced for first violators. For a second violation, the fine will double.

== Design and operations ==
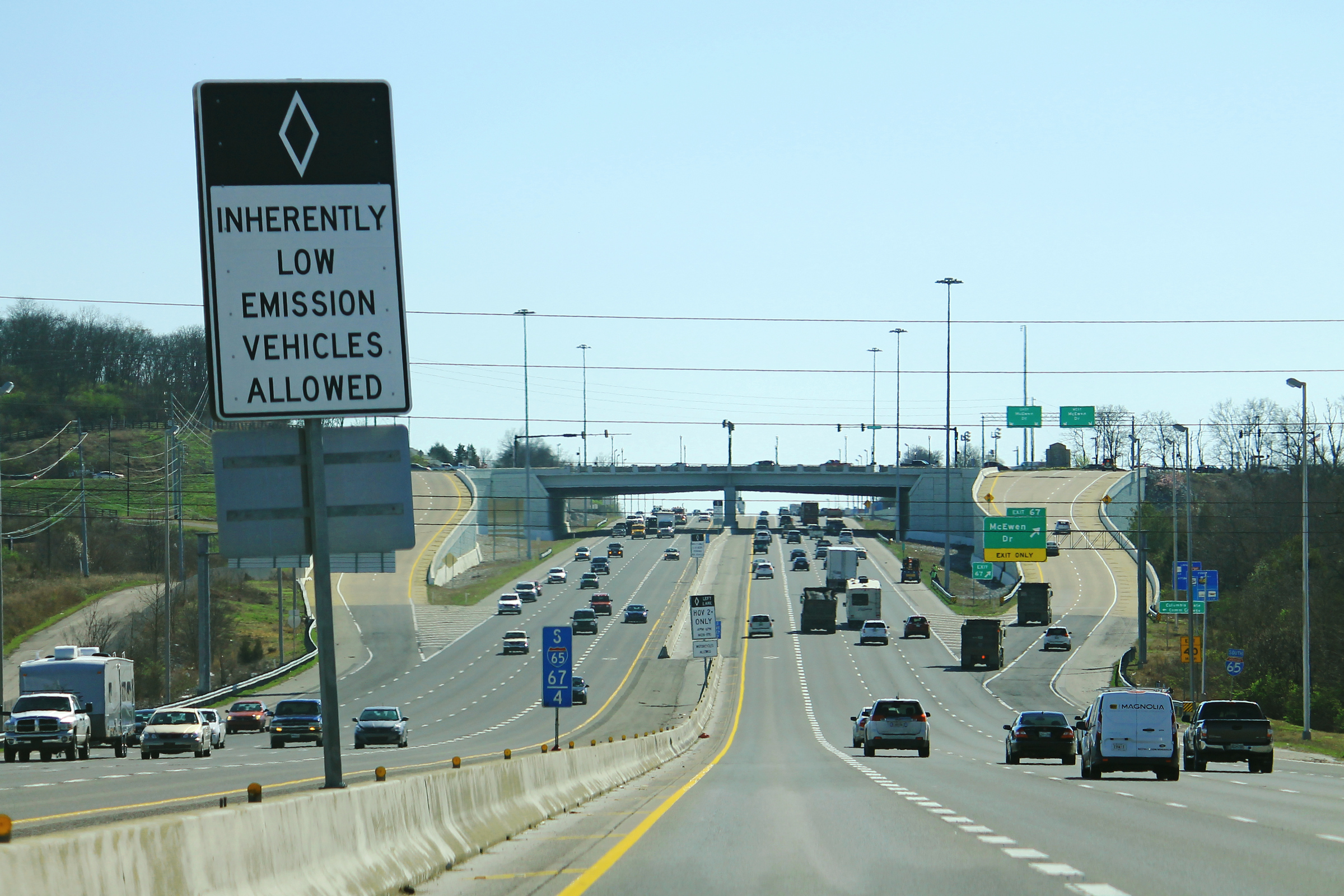
An HOV lane on I-65 in Franklin, Tennessee. The split jersey barriers are designed to allow police to enforce these lanes from the left shoulder.

HOV lanes may be either a single lane within the main roadway with distinctive markings or a separate roadway with one or more traffic lanes either parallel to the general lanes or grade-separated, above or below the general lanes. For example, Interstate 110 in California has four HOV lanes on an upper deck.

HOV bypass lanes are intended to allow carpool traffic, buses and police to bypass areas of regular congestion in many places. An HOV lane may operate as a reversible lane, working in the direction of the dominant traffic flow in both the morning and the afternoon. All lanes of a 10 miles (16 km) section of the Interstate 66 in the suburbs of Washington, D.C., are treated as an HOV during the rush hour in the primary direction of flow.

The traffic speed differential between HOV and general-purpose lanes creates a potentially dangerous situation if the HOV lanes are not separated by a barrier. A Texas Transportation Institute study found that HOV lanes lacking barrier separations caused a 50% increase in injury crashes.

== Variants ==
=== Business access and transit lane ===
A business access and transit (BAT) lane is a type of HOV lane that allows for all traffic to enter the lane for a short distance in order to access other streets and business entrances.

=== High-occupancy toll lane ===
Because some HOV lanes were not utilized to their full capacity, users of low- or single-occupancy vehicles may be permitted to use an HOV lane if they pay a toll. This scheme is known as high-occupancy toll lane (or HOT lanes), and it has been introduced mainly in the United States. The first practical implementation was California's formerly private toll 91 Express Lanes, in Orange County, California, in 1995, followed in 1996 by Interstate 15 north of San Diego. According to the Texas A&M Transportation Institute, by 2012 there were 294 corridor-miles of HOT/Express lanes and 163 corridor-miles of HOT/Express lanes under construction in the United States.

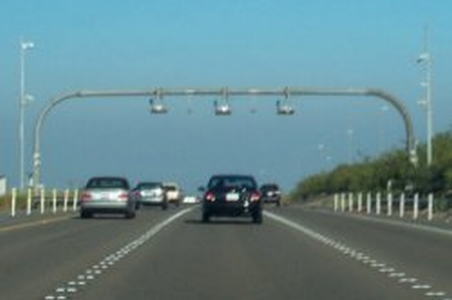
FasTrak RFID station in Orange County, California

Solo drivers are permitted to use the HOV lanes upon payment of a fee that varies based on demand. Tolls change throughout the day according to real-time traffic conditions, which is intended to manage the number of cars in the lanes to maintain good journey times.

Proponents claim that all motorists benefit from HOT lanes, even those who choose not to use them. This argument applies only to projects that increase the total number of lanes. Proponents also claim that HOT lanes provide an incentive to use transit and ridesharing. There has been controversy over this concept, and HOT schemes have been called "Lexus" lanes, as critics see this new pricing scheme as a perk for the rich.

HOT tolls are collected by staffed toll booths, automatic number plate recognition, or electronic toll collection systems. Some systems use RFID transmitters to monitor entry and exiting of the lane and charge drivers depending on demand. Typically, tolls increase as traffic density and congestion within the tolled lanes increase, a policy known as congestion pricing. The goal of this pricing scheme is to minimize traffic congestion within the lanes.

== Qualifying vehicles ==
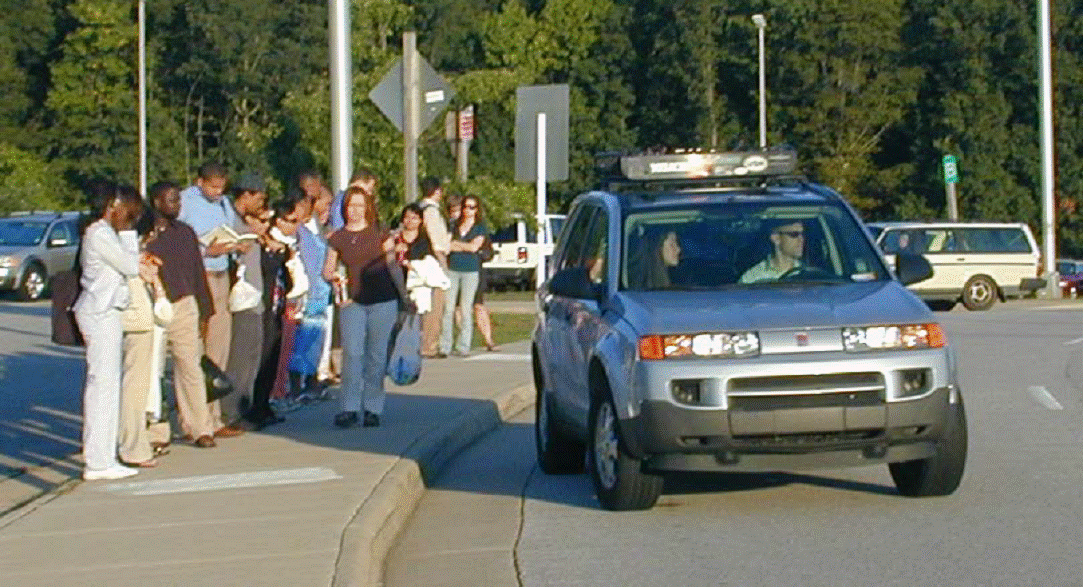
A slugging area, where solo drivers find a passenger to use the HOV

Qualification for HOV status varies by scheme, but the following vehicles may be included:

- Private cars and taxis with a minimum number of human occupants (often two or three), including babies of any age (but only after birth).
- Single-occupant green vehicles, such as hybrid electric vehicles, plug-in hybrids, and battery electric vehicles
- Motorcycles - motorcycles are allowed via federal United States HOV lane law (Title 23, Section 166). They can use HOV lanes in Ontario even if they only have a single passenger.
- Buses designed to transport sixteen or more passengers, including the driver
- Public utility vehicles when responding to emergency calls
- Bicycles
- Police are allowed to use the HOV lanes in Ontario.

New York City HOV lane codes prior to 2008 did not allow motorcycles leading to ticketing of motorcycle drivers and complaints from the American Motorcyclist Association, but have since been revised to comply with the federal regulations listed above.

In some jurisdictions such as Ontario, Canada, taxicabs and airport limousines are allowed to use HOV lanes even when no passenger is present because that vehicle "will be able return to duty faster after dropping off a fare or arrive sooner to pick up a fare, thereby moving more people to their destinations in fewer vehicles".

In Virginia, the San Francisco Bay Area, Houston, and other HOV lane locations, commuters form sluglines where drivers pick up one or more passengers from a designated "casual carpool" or "slug lines" to drive on HOV lanes; the driver pulls over near the sluglines and shouts out their destination, and people in the line going to that destination enter the car on a first-come, first-served basis.

== Compliance, enforcement, and avoidance ==
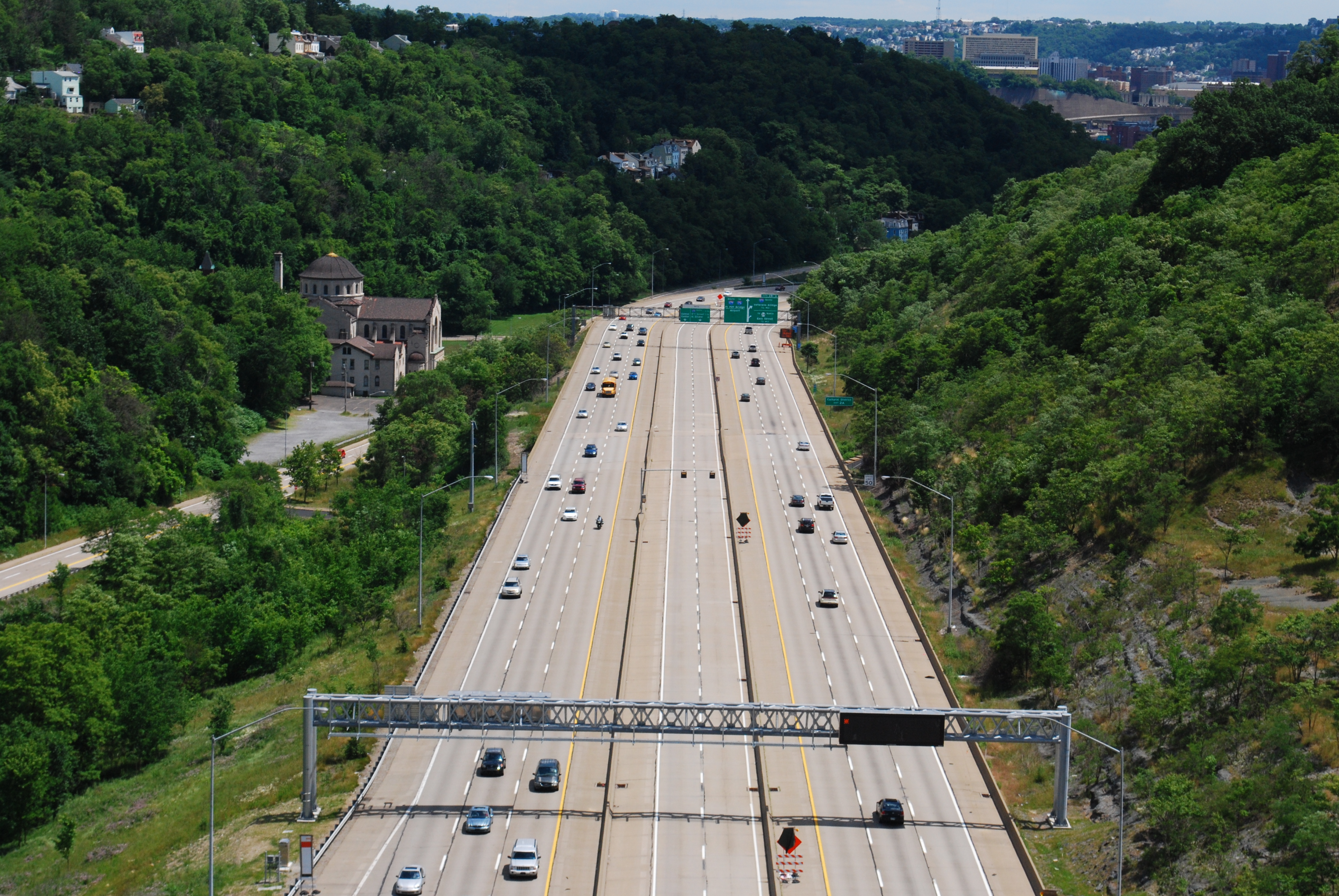
Dedicated reversible HOV lanes on Interstate 279 outside Pittsburgh

Fines are usually imposed on drivers of non-qualifying vehicles who use the lanes.

Following the introduction of HOVs, some drivers placed inflatable dolls in the passenger seat, a practice that persists today, even though it is now illegal. Cameras that can distinguish between humans and mannequins or dolls were tested in the United Kingdom in 2005.

In the United States, law enforcement officials have documented a variety of methods used by drivers in attempts to circumvent HOV occupancy rules:

- Placing store mannequins, blow-up dolls, kickboxing dummies, or cardboard cut-outs in the passenger seat;
- Taping styrofoam wig stands with wigs or balloons with faces drawn on them to the passenger seat headrest;
- Buckling the passenger-side seat belt and pretending to talk to someone reclining in that seat;
- Tinting the front windshield and/or lowering the passenger side visor in an effort to obstruct the view into the passenger seat;
- Covering an empty infant seat with a blanket and/or placing a doll in it;
- Strapping dogs, cats, or other pets into the passenger seat.

In early 2006, a pregnant Arizona woman asserted that she had been improperly ticketed for using the HOV lane because the fetus she was carrying in her womb justified her use of the lane, noting that Arizona traffic laws do not define what constitutes a person. However, a judge subsequently ruled that to qualify as an "individual" under Arizona traffic laws, the individual must occupy a "separate and distinct" space in a vehicle. Likewise, in California, in order to use HOV lanes, there must be two (or, if posted, three) separate individuals occupying seats in a vehicle, and an unborn child does not count towards this requirement.

In 2009 and 2010 it was found that non-compliance rates on HOV lanes in Brisbane, Australia, were approaching 90%. Enhanced enforcement led to increased compliance, average bus journey times dropped by about 19%, and total person throughput increased by 12%.

In February 2010, a 61-year-old woman tried to pass off a life-sized mannequin as a passenger in order to use the HOV lane in New York State. A police officer on a routine HOV patrol became suspicious when he noticed that the so-called passenger was wearing sunglasses and using the visor on a cloudy morning. When the officer approached the vehicle, he discovered that the "passenger" was, in fact, a mannequin wearing lipstick, designer shades, a full-length wig, and a blue sweater. The driver was issued a traffic ticket for using the HOV lane without a human passenger, which carries a fine of $135 in 2010 and two points on a driver's license.

In January 2013, a motorist tried to claim that the Articles of Incorporation of his business, which had been placed unbuckled on the passenger’s seat, constituted a person, citing the principle of corporate personhood and California's state Vehicle Code, which defines a person as "natural persons and corporations". This argument was rejected in traffic court, where the presiding judge commented, "Common sense says carrying a sheaf of papers in the front seat does not relieve traffic congestion."

In March 2015, a motorist tried to use a cardboard cutout of actor Jonathan Goldsmith to access an HOV lane in Fife, Washington. The officer noted that other drivers had used sleeping bags in earlier attempts to access the HOV lane.

In July 2022, a pregnant woman in Texas argued that her fetus counted as a passenger for the purpose of using the HOV lane following the Dobbs v. Jackson Women's Health Organization decision and Texas law subsequently considering fetuses people.

== Effectiveness ==
According to 2009 data from the U.S. census, 76% drive to work alone and only 10% rideshare. For suburban commuters working in a city, the solo driving rate is 82%.

Some underused HOV lanes in several states have been converted to high-occupancy toll lanes (HOT), which offer solo drivers access to HOV lanes after paying a toll.

HOV lanes are also an effective way to manage traffic after natural disasters, as seen in New York City after Hurricane Sandy in October 2012. At the time Mayor Bloomberg banned passenger cars with fewer than three occupants from entering Manhattan. The restriction affected all bridges and tunnels entering the city except the George Washington Bridge.

== Criticism ==
Critics have argued that HOV lanes are underused. It is unclear whether HOV lanes are sufficiently used to compensate for delays in the other mixed-use lanes.

The situations have caused social problems in Indonesia, where some people become "car jockey", people who make their living by offering drivers to fill their car in order to meet the occupancy limit. Reportedly, the situation caused people stay in unemployment for doing so, increased congestion, and let parents profit from their babies.

== Gallery ==
Standard restrictive traffic sign in the United States. The diamond symbol (◊) indicates a preferential-only lane restriction, in this case an HOV with two or more occupants.

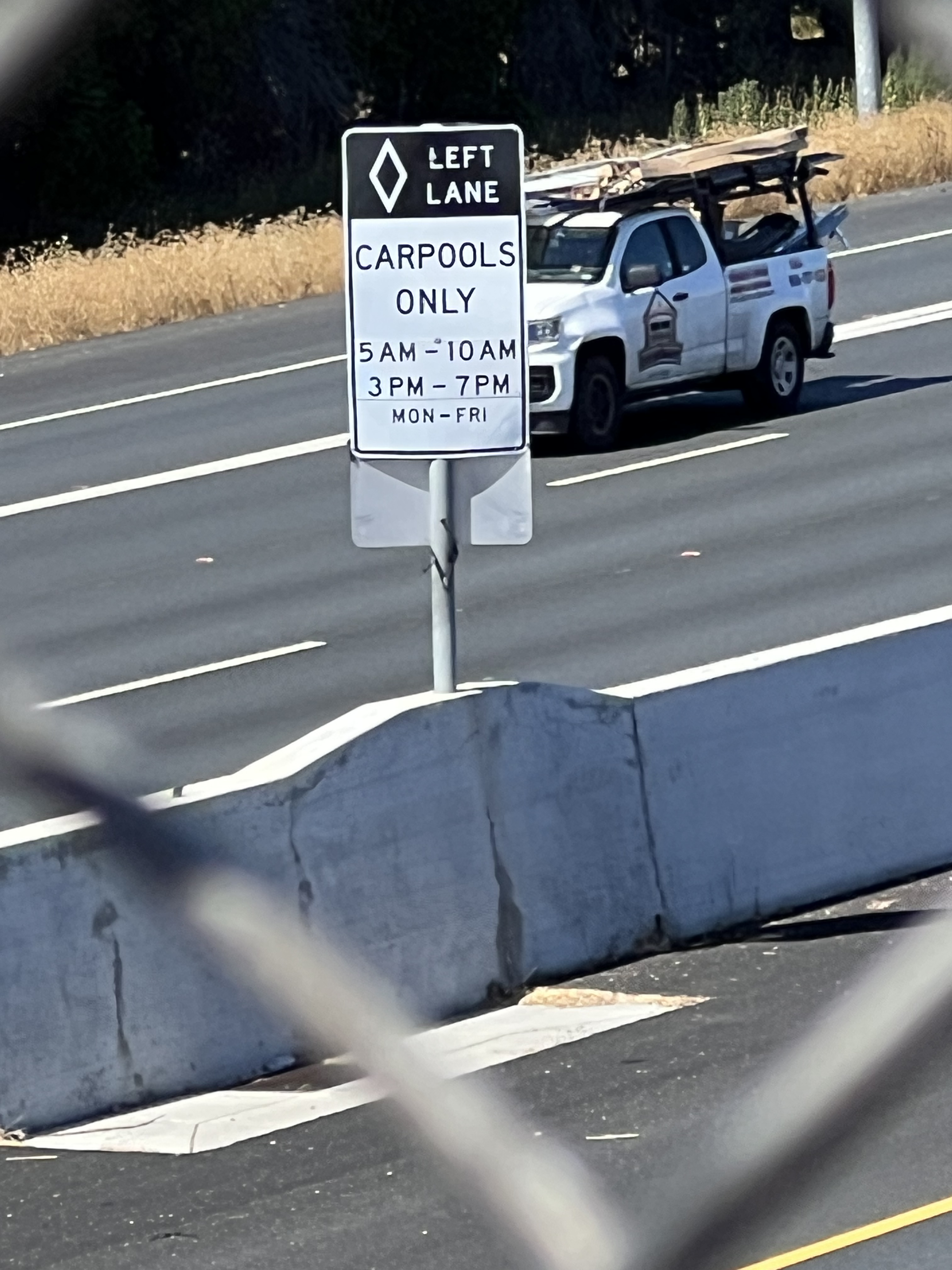
Sign reserving the left lane for HOV, conditional on weekdays from 5:00 a.m. to 10:00 a.m., and from 3:00 p.m. to 7:00 p.m. At the time this image was snapped, the restrictions were not in effect.

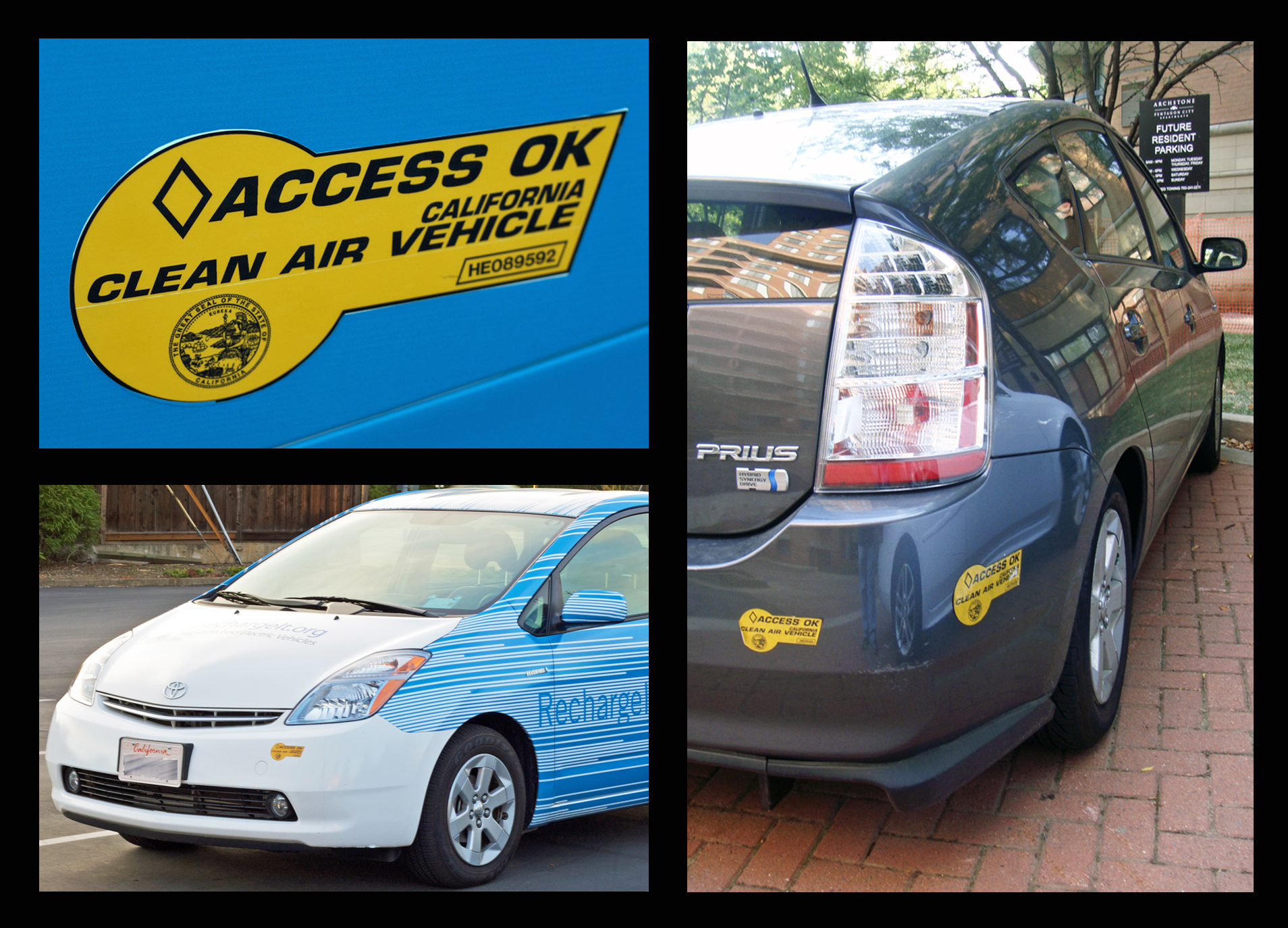
California HOV sticker for hybrid electric vehicles (The benefit for non-plug-in hybrids expired on 1 July 2011.)

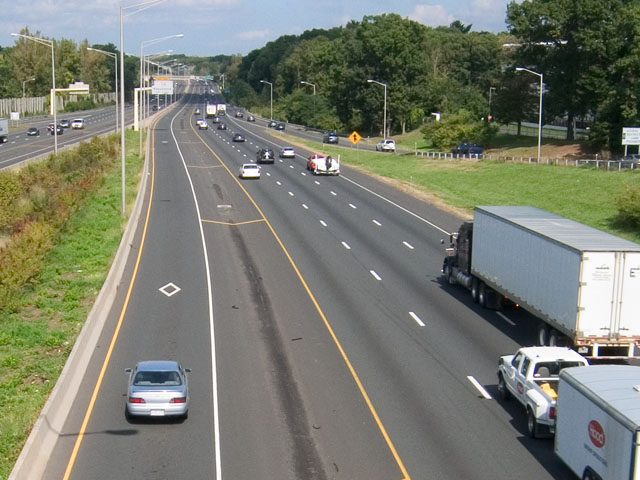
A permanent, separated HOV lane on I-91 near Hartford, Connecticut

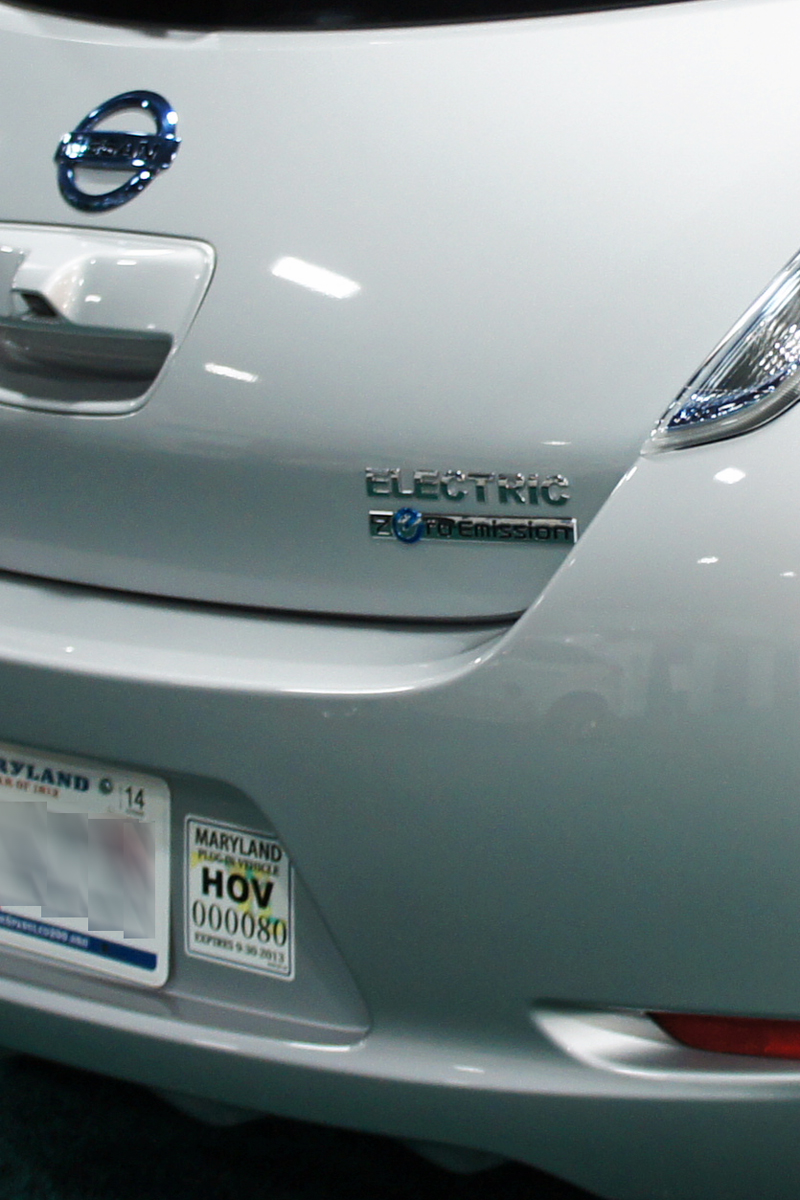
Nissan Leaf electric car with Maryland's sticker to identify plug-in electric vehicles eligible to use HOV lanes with solo drivers

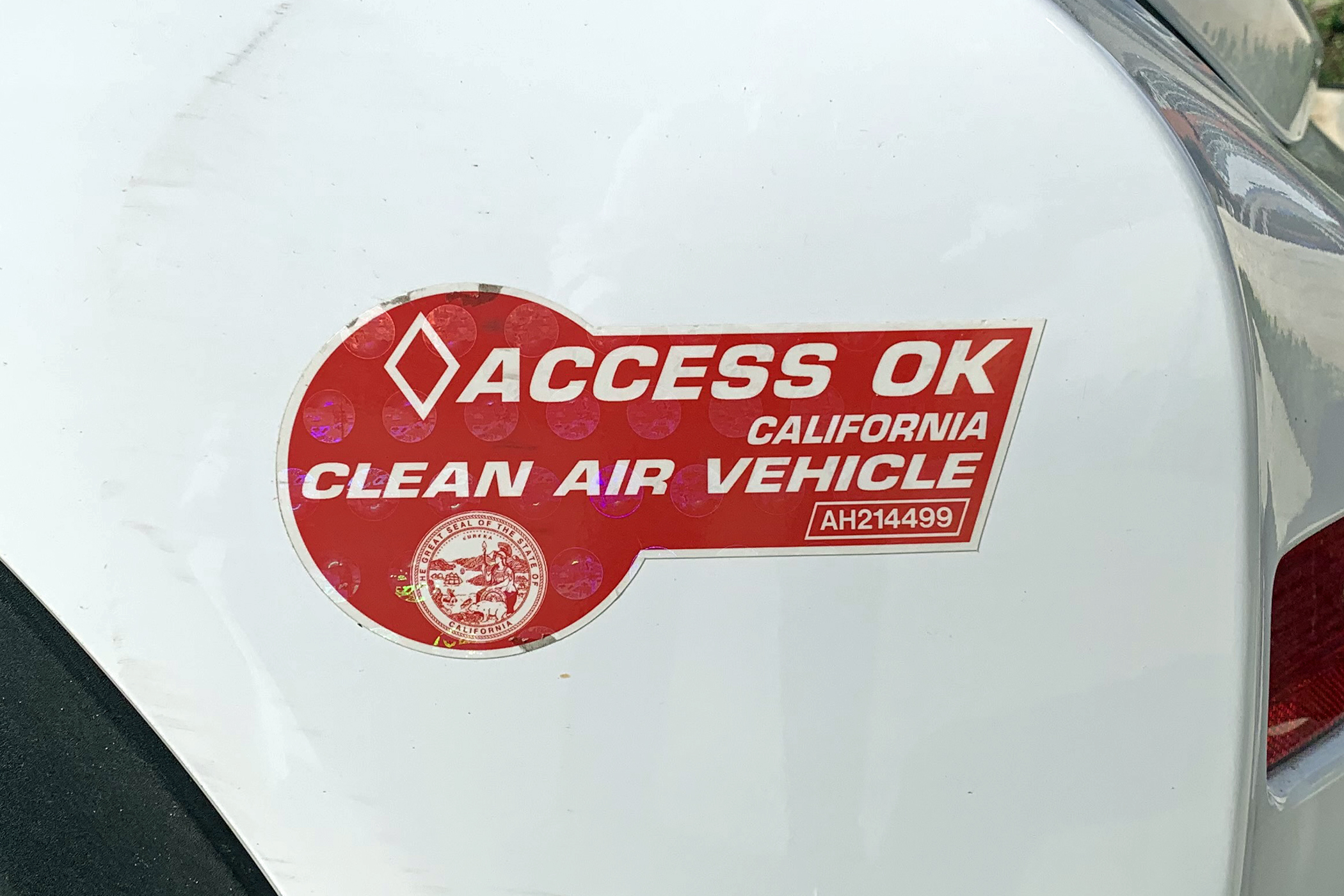
California's red Clean Air Vehicle sticker to allow solo access for electric cars to HOV lanes (The benefit for electric vehicles expired on 30 September 2025.)

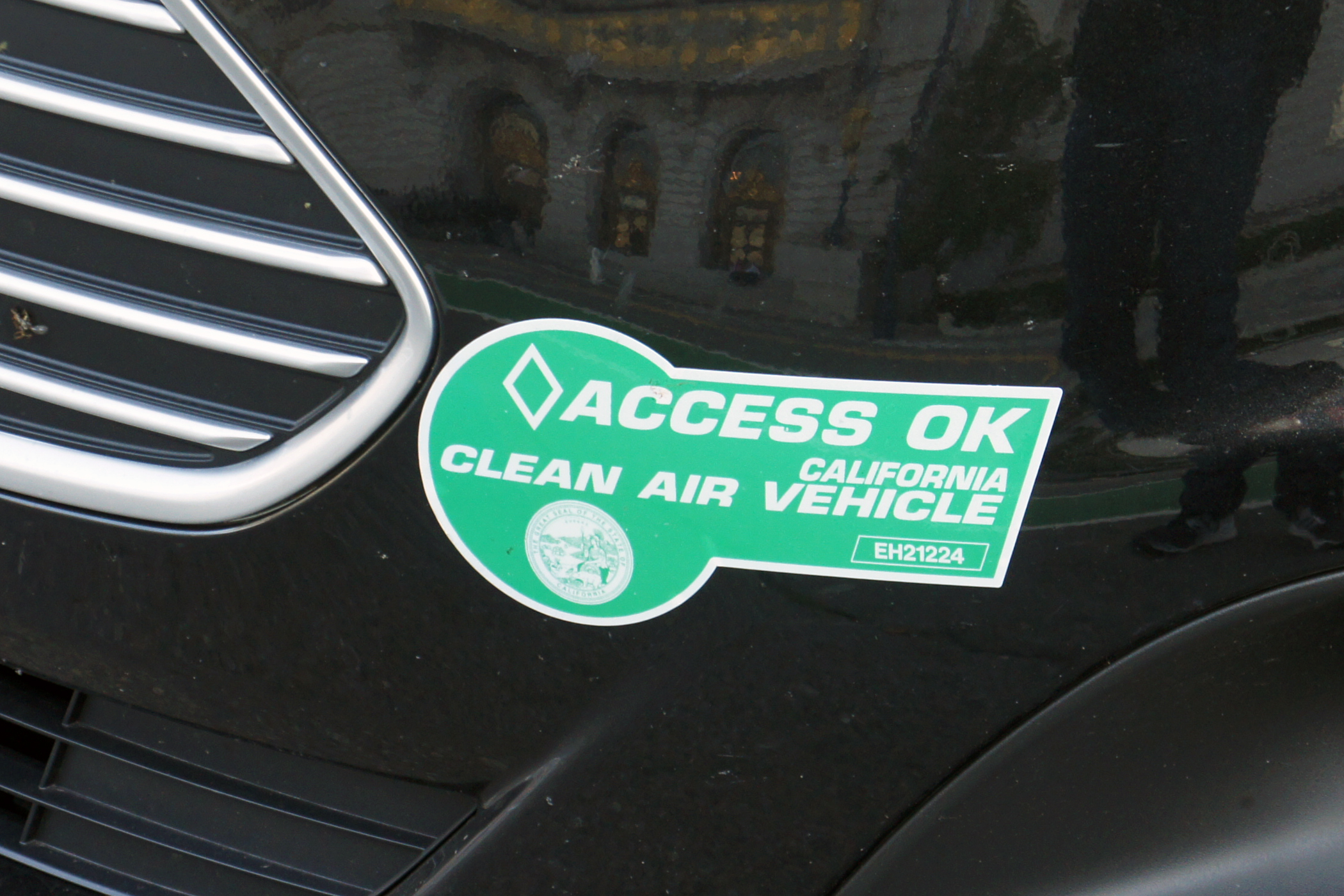
California's green Clean Air Vehicle sticker used to allow solo access for plug-in hybrids to HOV lanes (The benefit for plug-in hybrids expired on 30 September 2025.)

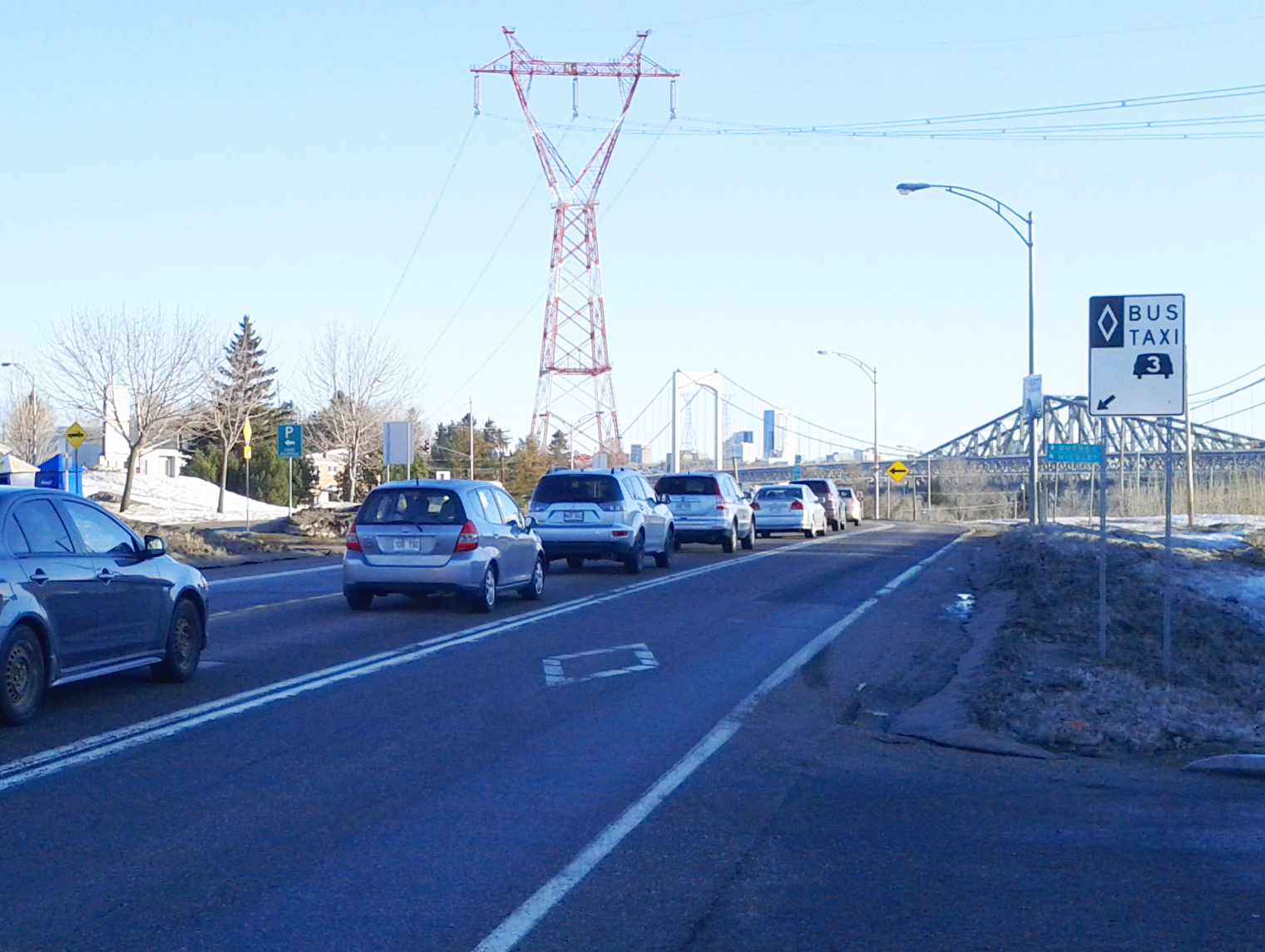
A T3 HOV/bus lane on route 116, in Lévis, Quebec

== See also ==
- Bus rapid transit
- Crush load – High passenger vehicle occupancy leading to crushing
- Headway – Distance between vehicles in a transit system measured in time or space
- Local-express lanes
- Passengers per hour per direction – Measure of passenger capacity of a transportation network
- Platoon (automobile) – Group of vehicles travelling separately but following another
- Route capacity – Maximum occupancy of a route in a given time
- Toll road
- Transportation Demand Management
