= Otelo Burning =

- Theatrical release poster
- Directed by: Sara Blecher
- Screenplay by: James Whyle; Sara Blecher; The Cast Workshop
- Produced by: Sara Blecher
- Starring: Jafta Mamabolo; Thomas Gumede; Sihle Xaba; Tshepang Mohlomi; Nolwazi Shange
- Narrated by: Justine Loots
- Cinematography: Lance Gewer
- Edited by: Megan Gill
- Music by: Alan Lazar; Tiago Correia-Paulo
- Distributed by: Indigenous Film Distribution
- Release dates: 8 October 2011 (Pusan International Film Festival); 6 April 2012 (South Africa)
- Running time: 102 minutes
- Country: South Africa
- Language: Zulu

Otelo Burning is a 2011 South African drama film directed and produced by Sara Blecher. The screenplay was written by James Whyle, Sara Blecher and The Cast Workshop. The film is in Zulu with English subtitles. It stars Jafta Mamabolo (Generations), Thomas Gumede (A Place Called Home), and Tshepang Mohlomi (Izulu Lami).

== Plot ==
In 1989, at the peak of the struggle against Apartheid. 16-year-old Otelo Buthelezi, his younger brother, Ntwe, and his best friend, New Year, are invited to the beach house where their new friend's mother is a domestic worker.

They consider the area to be the opposite of the township where they live – which is under a constant and growing threat from political violence from Inkatha and United Democratic Front supporters. The boys, originally afraid of water, become interested in surfing.

It is revealed that Otelo is gifted at surfing. An older white man, Kurt Struely, approaches the boys and invites them home to watch some professional surfers on video, and encourages them to continue surfing. Mandla begins to resent Otelo's skill, whose resentment builds even more when Dezi, New Year's younger sister, falls for Otelo.

As the boys begin to win competitions, Mandla's jealousy grows and eventually he betrays his friend. In exchange for money for a new surfboard, he sells Otelo's brother out as a suspected informer to the apartheid security police.

When Otelo discovers his younger brother's death, he has to choose between international surfing competitions or justice for Ntwe. On the day Nelson Mandela is released from prison in 1990, Otelo makes his choice.

== Cast ==
The cast is mostly made up of young up-and-coming actors who were integrally involved in the world of the story.

- Jafta Mamabolo as Otelo
- Thomas Gumede as New Year
- Sihle Xaba as Mandla Modise
- Tshepang Mohlomi as Ntwe
- Nolwazi Shange as Dezi
- Kenneth Nkosi as Oscar Buthelezi
- Harriet Manamela as Mother Christmas
- Hamilton Dhlamini as Skhumbuzo
- Motlatsi Mafatsche as Blade

== Production ==
The film was in development for over seven years and came out of an extensive workshop process conducted with a group of children in Lamontville, near Durban.

=== Filming ===
Much of the film was shot handheld on location in the South African province of KwaZulu-Natal. Most of the film was shot on a RED camera, provided by Panavision. The surf scenes were filmed on a Canon 5D by Fixer Films from Cape Town.

== Music ==
The film's original score was composed by Alan Lazar and Tiago Correia-Paulo. The following songs also appeared in the film:

- Induna (The Headman) - Shiyani Ngcobo
- March in the Line - Casino
- Mkhozi - Monwa & Sun
- All Night Jive - Zone 3
- Reggae Vibes is Cool - James Phillips
- Ezweni Elihle-Hle - Masibuyele Kujehova
- Zulu
- Straight Forward - The Big Red One
- Hold On - Modern English
- Thugs - The Dynamics
- Hoi Chaklas - Mr. Chacklas
- Dangerous - MM Deluxe
- Who's Worried - The Dynamics
- My Dreams Won't Wait - Zaki Ibrahim
- Sunshine - Zaki Ibrahim
- Cold World - Tumi and Andreena Mill

== Reception ==
The project was taken to the No Borders IFP in New York in September 2009, and was chosen for the IFP Independent Film Narrative Labs in 2011. Otelo Burning was the opening film for the 32nd Durban International Film Festival.

== Awards ==
The film won the awards of Best Dramatic feature and Surfing movie at the 2013 Byron Bay International Film Festival.
