= Sara Blecher =

South African director and producer

- Born: Gauteng
- Education: New York University
- Occupations: director and producer
- Notable work: Mayfair; Dis ek, Anna

Sara Blecher (born Gauteng) is a South African director and producer.

== Biography ==
Originally from South Africa, Blecher's family moved to Brooklyn, New York in 1981, when she was 12 years old. Her family is originally of Jewish Lithuanian origin, which informs some of her work. After a brief spell at Georgetown University, Blecher lived in Paris for a year and enrolled in film school upon her return to New York. In 1992, shortly after graduating from New York University, she returned to South Africa. She directed the documentaries Surfing Soweto and Kobus And Dumile.

She was nominated for Best Movie Director at the 2013 Africa Magic Viewers' Choice Awards for her first film Otelo Burning, a story of how 16-year-old Otelo Buthelez learns how to surf during the apartheid era. The film won 17 awards internationally. It was filmed in Zulu, with English subtitles, and stars Jafta Mamabolo, Thomas Gumede, and Tshepang Mohlomi. Following the success of Otelo Burning, Blecher received funding from the National Film and Video Foundation (NFVF) for a "slate of films". Her second film, Ayanda, premiered on 10 October at the 2015 BFI London Film Festival and took international honors at the LA Film Festival in 2015.

Blecher is married and has three children.

== Filmography ==
- Mayfair (2018)
- Half the Sky (2018)
- Measure of A Woman (2018)
- Dis ek, Anna (2015)
- Ayanda (2015)
- Otelo Burning (2011)
- Surfing Soweto (2010)
- Who Do Yo Think You Are? (2009)
- Bay of Plenty (2007)
- Kobus And Dumile (2002)
