= White Lion (film) =

- Film poster
- Directed by: Michael Swan
- Written by: Janet Van Eeden; Ivan Milborrow; Michael Swan; Kevin Richardson; Ben Horowitz
- Produced by: Kevin Richardson
- Starring: John Kani
- Cinematography: Michael Swan
- Edited by: Bridgette Fahey Goldsmith
- Music by: Philip Miller
- Production company: Peru Productions
- Distributed by: Screen Media Films; Showcase Entertainment
- Release date: 6 June 2010 (Seattle)
- Running time: 93 minutes
- Country: South Africa
- Language: English

White Lion is a 2010 South African drama film directed by Michael Swan and starring John Kani.

== Cast ==
- John Kani
- Thabo Malema
- AJ Van der Merwe
- Brendan Grealy
- Jamie Bartlett
- Thor (The White lion, Letsatsi)

== Release ==
The film premiered on 6 June 2010 at the Seattle International Film Festival.

Screen Media Films acquired North American distribution rights to the film on September that same year.

== Reception ==
Lisa A. Goldstein of Common Sense Media awarded the film four stars out of five.
