= Surfing Soweto =

- Film poster
- Directed by: Sara Blecher and Dimi Raphoto
- Screenplay by: Justine Loots
- Produced by: Sara Blecher
- Cinematography: Dudley Saunders
- Edited by: Karyn Bosch
- Music by: Phillip Miller
- Release date: 2010
- Running time: 85 minutes
- Country: South Africa

Surfing Soweto is a 2010 documentary film directed by Dimi Raphoto and Sara Blecher.

== Synopsis ==
Surfing Soweto is the story of a forgotten generation: Bitch Nigga, Lefa and Mzembe are three of the most notorious train surfers in Soweto. They represent a generation of alienated youth, born during the glowing promise after the demise of apartheid and yet without the skills or wherewithal to reap the benefits of their newly won freedoms. Surfing Soweto shows them riding on the top of trains (train surfing) which in South Africa is known as "ukudlala istaff", ducking as they hurtle past lethal electrical cables, and also in the intimacy of their homes and families.

== Awards ==
- Tri-Continental 2010
