= Jafta Mamabolo =

South African actor and director

- Born: Jafta Mamabolo; 21 December 1987 (age 38); Limpopo, South Africa
- Education: National School of Arts
- Occupations: Actor, director, writer, producer, fashion designer.
- Years active: 1999–present
- Height: 1.77m/5ft8in
- Awards: SAFTA Best Actor in a Feature Film
- Website: https://www.jaftamamabolo.com/

Jafta Mamabolo (born 21 December 1987) is a South African actor and filmmaker. He is best known for his roles in the popular films Freedom, Gangster's Paradise: Jerusalema and Otelo Burning.

== Personal life ==
He was born in 1987 in Limpopo, South Africa. He attended the National School of Arts and studied drama under renowned artists. Meanwhile, he wanted to be a fashion designer and studied a course of designing.

== Career ==
In 2008, he was selected for the film Jerusalema. The feature became his first film, where he played the character 'Young Kunene'. He received critical acclaim for the role. In 2011, he played the lead role in the film Otelo Burning, directed by Sara Blecher. The film became a blockbuster and later received a total of 13 nominations in the African Movie Academy Awards (AMAA) in 2012 as well as in 2013 Africa Magic Viewers Choice Awards and 8th Africa Movie Academy Awards. In 2015, he acted in the film Ayanda with role of 'Lenaka'. In 2016, he became famous with the feature film Kalushi: The Story of Solomon Mahlangu, which was based on a true story. In the film, he played a supportive role of 'Lucky'. The film was a critical success and awarded at several film festivals.

Apart from cinema, he worked as a presenter on various television shows, such as the 'Molo show', 'Craze E', and 'Knock knock'. Then he joined the cast of third and fourth season of youth drama program Soul Buddyz which aired on SABC1. His role later received a nomination for the Best Lead Actor in a TV drama series. In 2011, he played the role 'Matthew' in the popular soapie Generations.

After two-year long hiatus, he made a comeback in 2021 with the film Freedom. He wrote and directed the script for the film. The film later became a super hit in South African cinema. Jafta went on to win two SAFTAs (South African Film & Television Awards) at the 2022 ceremony, one for Best Actor in a Film, and another for Best Screenplay for his work on the critically acclaimed Freedom.

== Filmography ==
| Year | Film | Role | Genre | Ref. |
|---|---|---|---|---|
| 2001–2006 | Soul Buddyz | Thapelo | TV Series | |
| 2002–2005 | Craz-E! | Himself | Variety Show | |
| 2008 | Gangster's Paradise: Jerusalema | Young Kunene | Film | |
| 2010 | Soul City | Kagiso Vomo | TV Series | |
| 2011 | Generations | Matthew | TV series | |
| 2011 | Otelo Burning | Otelo Buthelezi | Film | |
| 2012 | Dream World | Lindelani | TV mini-series | |
| 2014 | Rhythm City | Tsetse-Fly | TV Series | |
| 2014–2016 | Mutual Friends | Jabu | TV Series | |
| 2015 | Mi Kasi Su Kasi | Executive Producer | TV Series | |
| 2015 | Ayanda | Lenaka Olandele | Film | |
| 2016 | Kalushi: The Story of Solomon Mahlangu | Lucky | Film | |
| 2021 | Freedom | Co-director, writer, actor: Freedom | Film | |
| 2022 | Senzo: Murder Of A Soccer Star | Producer | Docuseries | |
