= Train surfing =

Illegal act of riding on the outside of a moving train

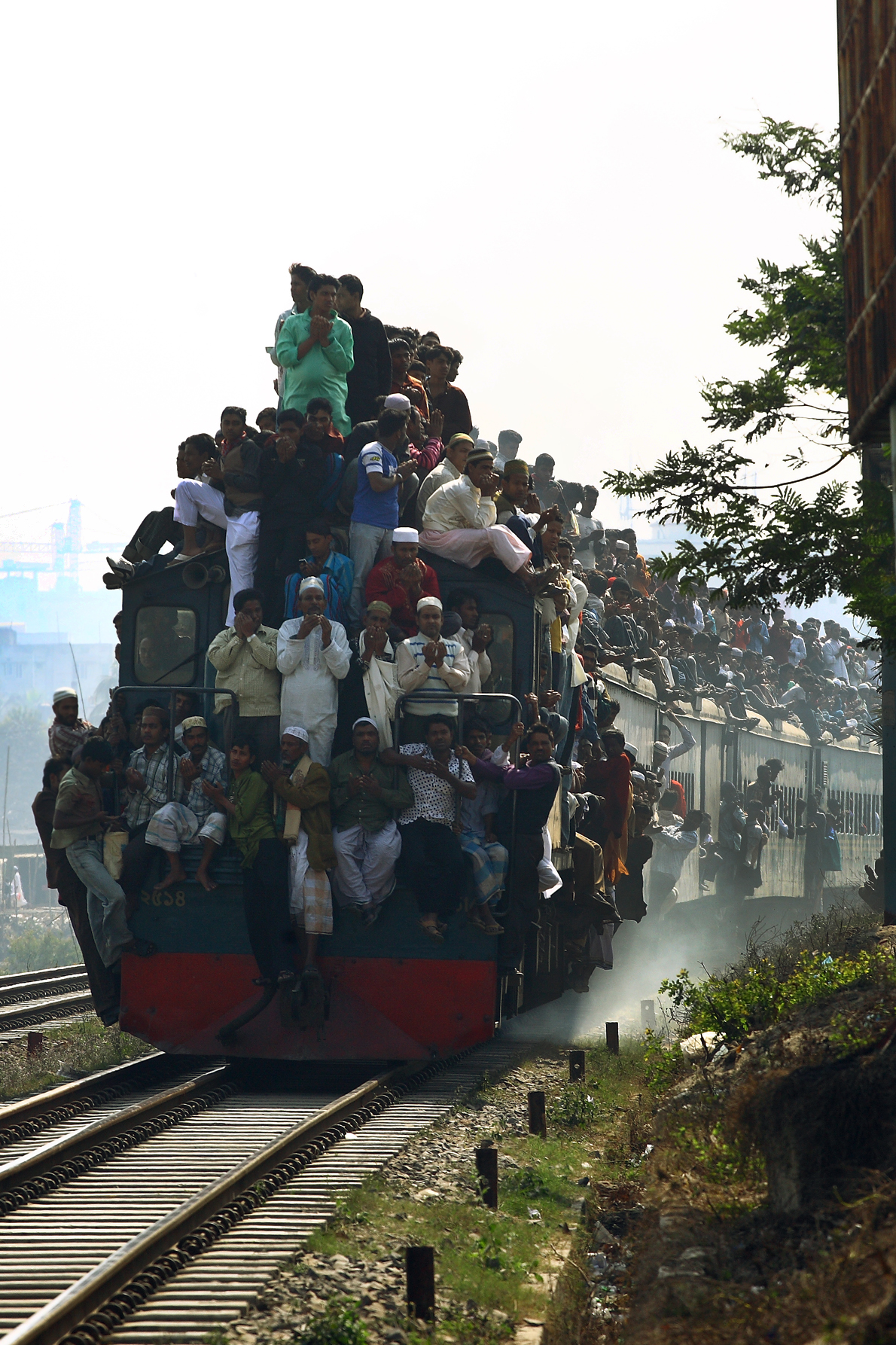
An overcrowded train with passengers riding on the outside in Bangladesh

Train surfing (also known as train hopping, train hitching, or subway surfing) is the act of riding on the outside of a moving train, tram, or other form of rail transport vehicle. This may be done for reasons of overcrowding, to avoid buying a ticket, or as a form of entertainment.

In a number of countries, the term train hopping is used synonymously with freight hopping, the act of riding on the outside of a freight train. Train surfing can be practiced on any type of train.

Train surfing can be extremely dangerous and even life-threatening, because there is a risk of death or serious injury due to falling off a moving train, electrocution by the power supply (overhead catenary wire, third rail, current collectors, resistors, etc.), colliding with railway infrastructure such as bridges, tunnels, station platforms, trackside buildings, railway signals or other trains, while riding outside of structure gauge on the side or on the roof of a train, or unsuccessful attempts to jump onto a moving train or off it.

The practice is illegal in most parts of the world, but it is still practiced on railways where the trains are overcrowded.

== Overcrowding ==
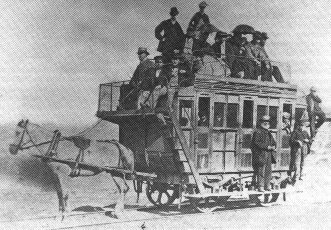
An early horse-drawn railway carriage with passengers on its roof and foot boards

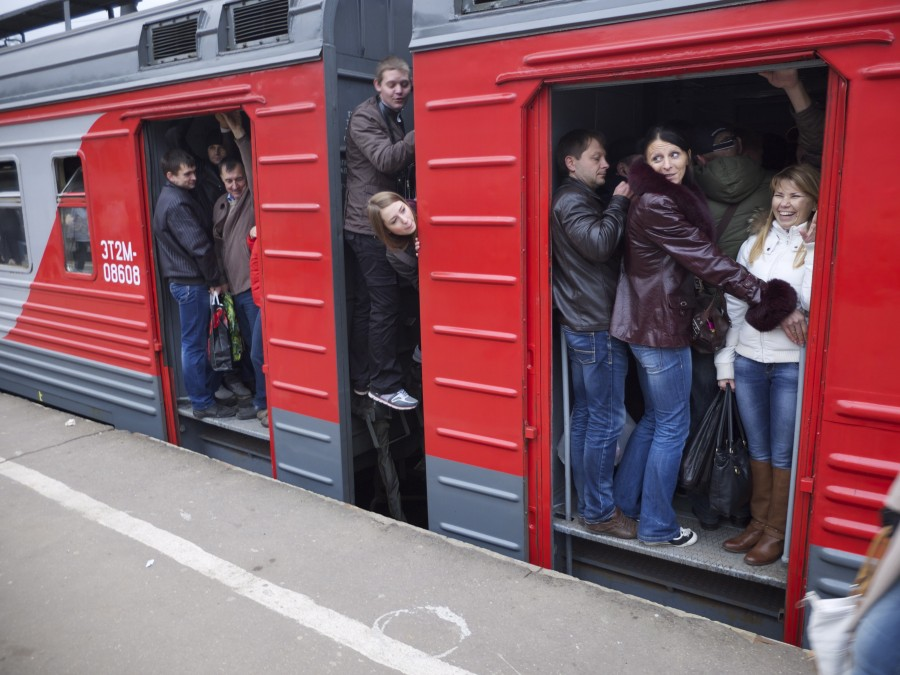
Morning rush hour at the railway station in Khimki, Russia. Due to overcrowding inside the train some passengers are forced to ride between the cars

The phenomenon of riding on the outside of trains came with the appearance of the first railway lines. On a series of first railways, riding on rooftops and footboards of trains was common, but over time, starting from the second half of the 19th century, with an increase in the sizes and speed of trains, passenger coaches began to be produced fully covered and insulated from streets with a placement of all passenger seats inside carriages in order to improve the safety of passengers and prevent people falling from a moving train.

As trams became more common in Europe and the United States in the early 20th century, overcrowding prompted passengers to begin riding on footboards, doors, couplers and sometimes on the roofs of trams. European conflicts such as the First World War, Russian Civil War and World War II frequently saw soldiers and refugees travelling on the roofs of carriages due to lack of seating.

In the mid-20th century, railways in many European and American countries took measures to reduce overcrowding in carriages and prevent riding outside of them, so the prevalence of train surfing in those countries decreased. In some countries of Southeast Asia and Africa with a high population density, however, the problem of overcrowding of different vehicles, including trains, grew rapidly, so train surfing in those countries became a widespread phenomenon.

Beginning in the mid-2000s there were frequent cancellations of commuter trains and crowding inside rail carriages in the Moscow region, leading to ordinary passengers riding on the roofs. In 2012 a Russian transport inspector said that "the fashion for train surfing began about three years ago, when they started running high-speed Sapsan trains. Because of this, there were big gaps in the electric train schedule. As a result, there was not enough space in the cars for everyone who wanted to. So people found a way out of the situation."

In Indonesia, especially Greater Jakarta, large numbers of people train surf, especially since the late 1990s, as gridlock grips this metropolis of 30 million without a single metro system, and the city comes up with alternative transport such as car jockeys. Jakarta traffic is the most gridlocked in Southeast Asia, perhaps among the worst worldwide. It has built a bus rapid transit system, but with little success, as there is no separation from the heavy traffic. The tropical heat and urban heat island effect also makes the top the only place on the train with plenty of air circulation. Since 2013 the practice has been eliminated after the state railway company Kereta Api Indonesia modernized the ticketing system, allowing tickets to be sold up to 90 days in advance, and including check in requirements along with increasing the amount of rolling stock. On KRL commuter services, stations are modernized by installing turnstiles, implementing contactless payment and locking down the station. All non-commuter trains now have a passenger limit of 100 to 110% while previously a service could run at 200% or more capacity.

== Travelling without a ticket ==
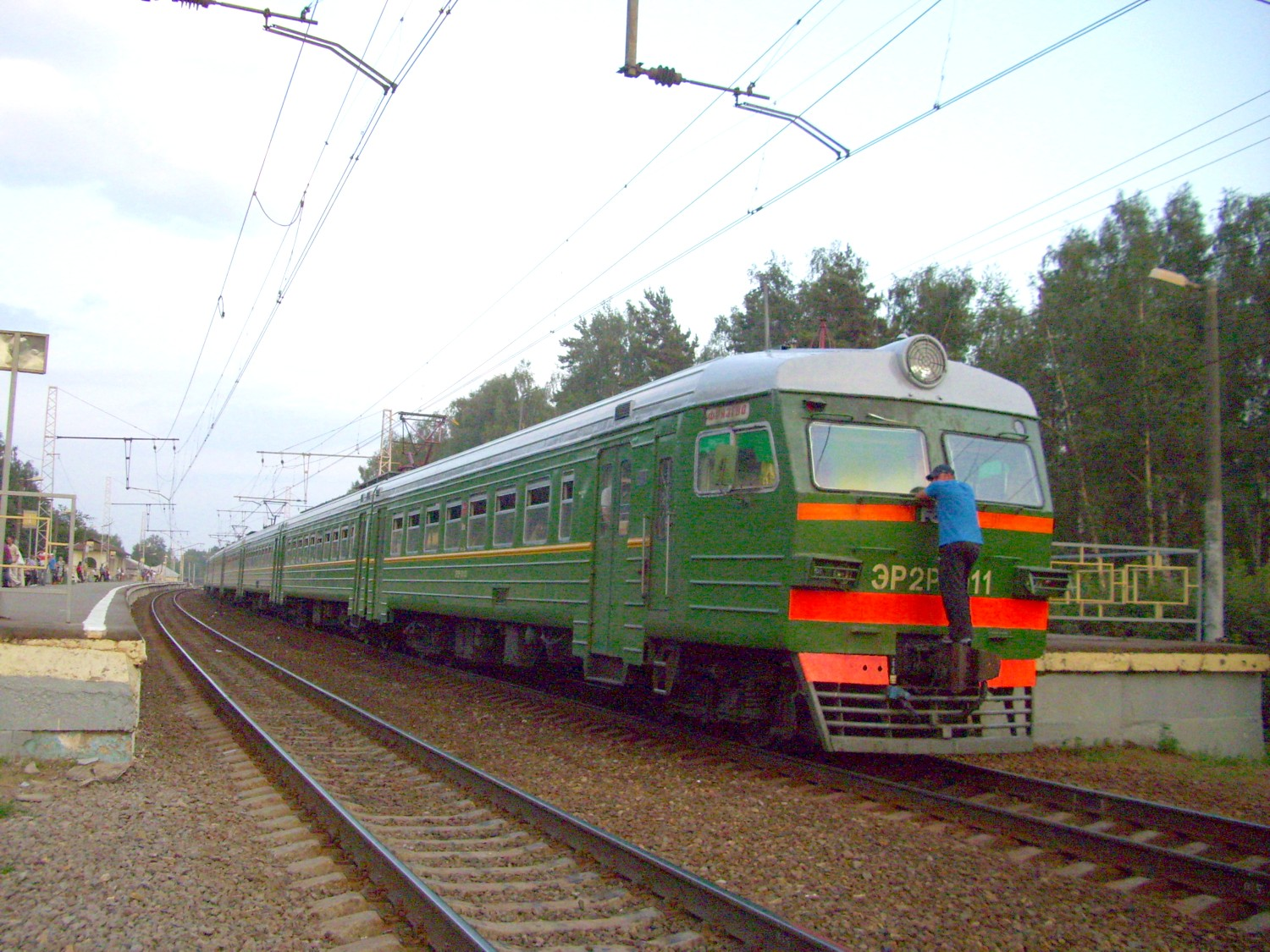
A fare evader riding outside the ER2R commuter train in Moscow Oblast

Despite the improvements in trains in the late 19th century, some individuals continued riding on the outside of trains to travel without having a ticket. In the United States, this became a common means of transportation following the American Civil War as the railways began pushing westward, especially among migrant workers who became known as "hobos". It continued to be widely used by those unable to afford other transportation, especially during times of widespread economic dislocation such as the Great Depression.

Individuals may train-surf in countries such as Bangladesh and South Africa to avoid the cost of a ticket or as a recreational activity.

Some railway workers, such as shunters or conductors, are often allowed to ride on exterior parts of trains during shunting operations, but with many limitations.

== For entertainment ==
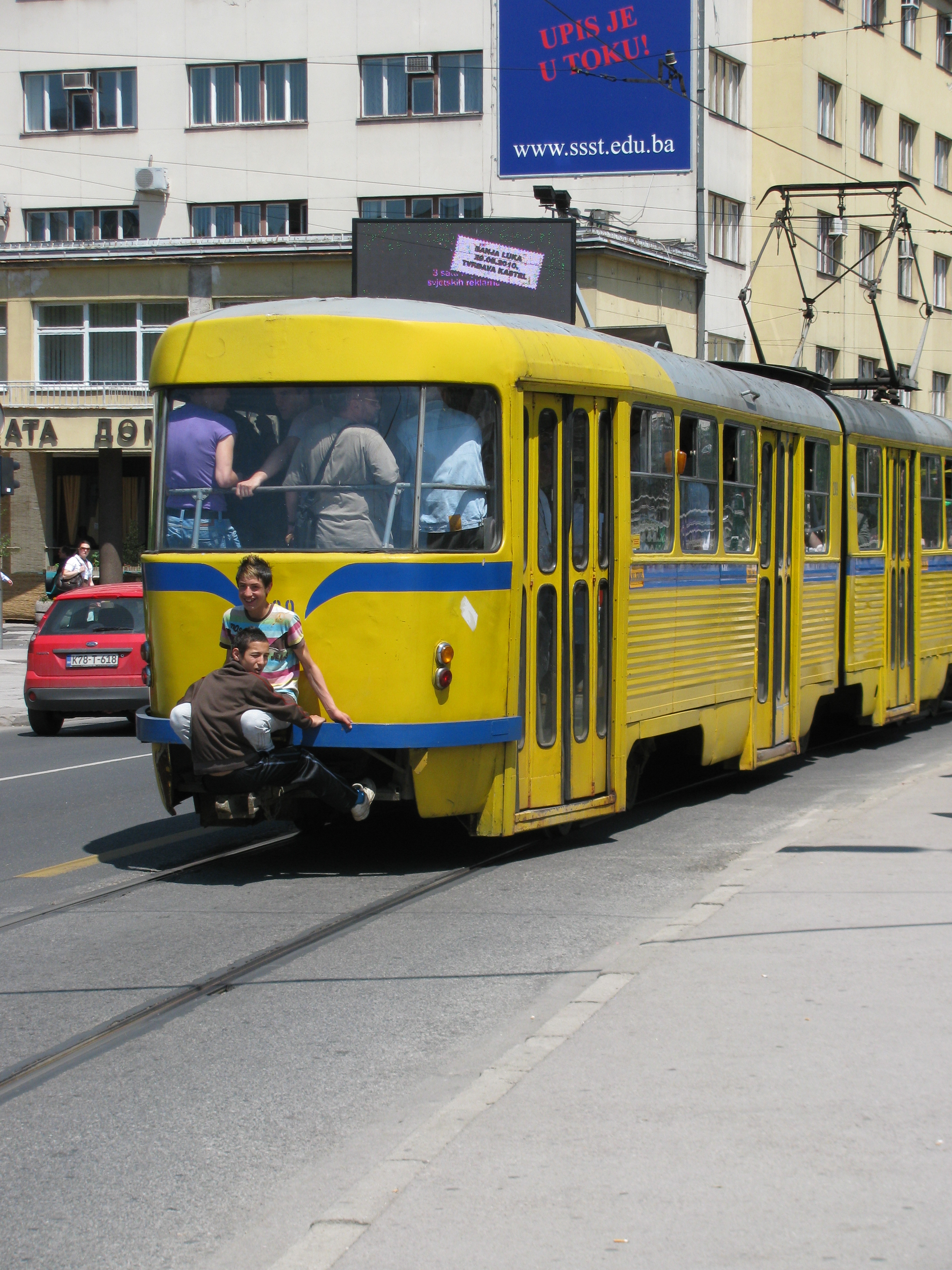
Tram surfing in Sarajevo 2010

New York City newspapers from the early 20th century record deaths and injuries from riding on top of trains. In 1904, the year that the city's subway opened, one teenage boy was killed and another injured when they rode a subway car roof together and were struck by low bridge.

Both train surfing and tram surfing were practiced by Soviet youths in the 1980s. The practice of surfing on electric trains increased in popularity in the 1990s in Russia and some other post-Soviet countries due to the economic crisis and growing interest among teens and youths who lived near the railways.

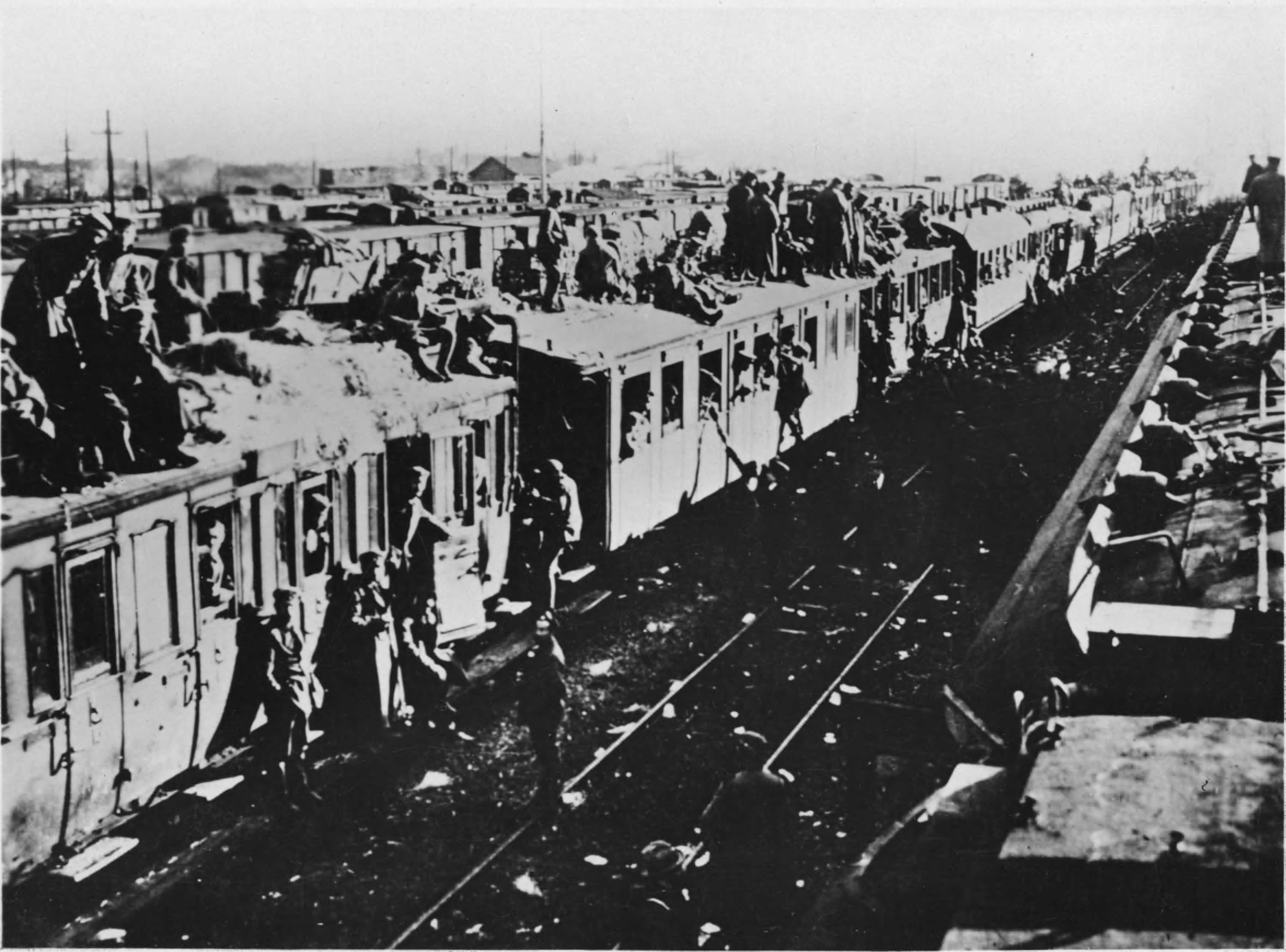
German demobilisation, Western Front, 1918. Soldiers cling on to the roofs and doors of a train already full of other troops

During this period from the 2000s to 2010 when roof riding among teenagers became more popular in Russia they began to create a community of train surfers and post videos on YouTube. Train surfers began to organize meetings and big-way surfing events on the outside of commuter, subway and local freight trains via the Internet. Russian train-surfing fans began to call themselves zatseper and also name their hobby zatseping (from the Russian word "Зацепиться-Zatsepitsya" translated as "to catch on"). Train surfing became something like an extreme sport discipline for them. In around the year 2000 they also began to surf subway trains in tunnels in the Moscow Metro, and organized train-surfing crews and web-communities.

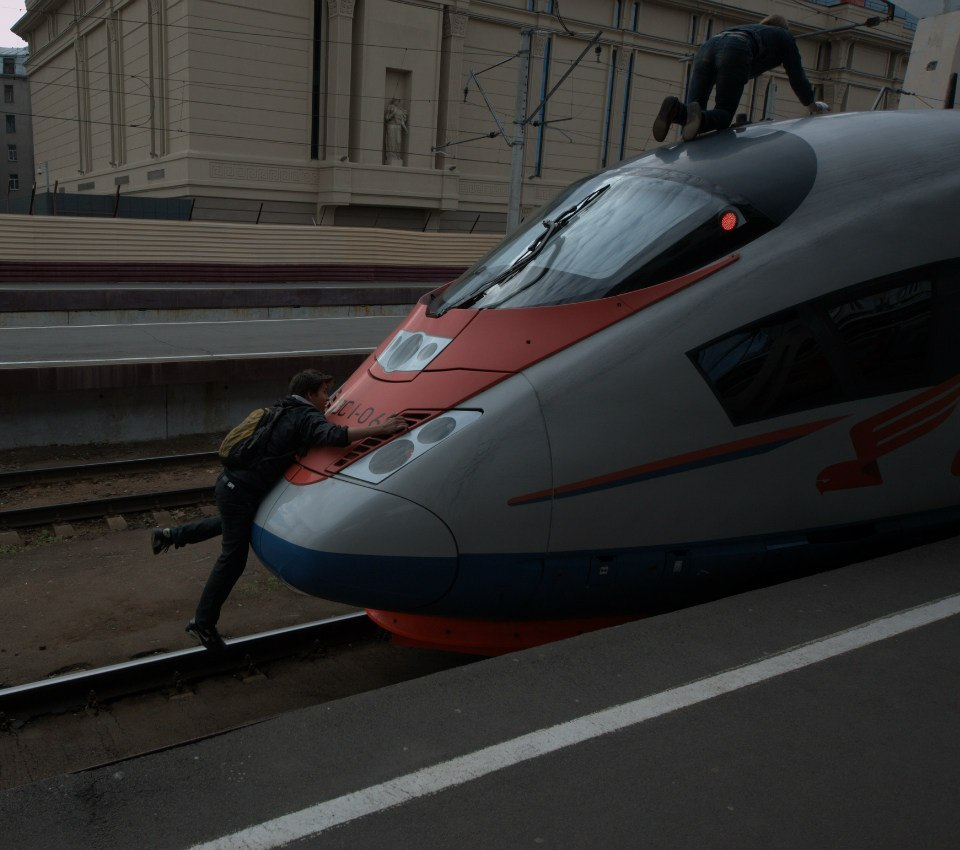
Train surfers climb onto a high-speed Velaro RUS "Sapsan" electric multiple unit train.

From the beginning of 2011, Russian train surfers made several rides on the outside of the high-speed Siemens Velaro train "Sapsan", the fastest train in Russia. In 2017, a Russian student spoke of travelling to school on the roof of a commuter train, or between its carriages. One recreational train surfer said that due to the increased overcrowding on trains, recreational train surfing on Sapsan trains "became easier" with commuters being less surprised by the practice and train staff more relaxed when reporting and ejecting them.

In South Africa, as an extreme hobby, train surfing firstly appeared in the 1980s among teenagers from poor families. Teenagers as young as 13 were reported as train surfing in Rio de Janeiro in 1988. During the 1990s, train surfing on a commuter electric multiple unit train became popular in Europe among young people who live near railway lines.

In Germany, the practice of S-Bahn surfing was made popular during the 1990s. The phenomenon was forgotten until 2005, when it was rediscovered by a group of train surfers from Frankfurt. The leader of the crew who calls himself "the Trainrider" surfed the InterCityExpress, the fastest train in Germany. An Internet video claimed that he died a year later from an incurable form of leukemia, but later the Trainrider revealed in an interview that this video was made by a fan and the story of his death was a hoax.

With the creation of the internet, the practice of filming the act and posting online videos of it is on the increase worldwide. Train surfers can use social networks to find and communicate with each other and organize trips by trains in small groups. Larger communities of train surfers sometimes organize major events in which dozens of people ride outside trains.

== Hazards ==
Common ways that accidents occur during train-surfing include people falling from the roof of the train, falling from the side of the train, falling underneath the wheels of a train, and colliding with an object located on the outside of the train such as a bridge, a signal bridge, a sign, a pole or another oncoming train.

Other ways accidents occur include when a person comes into contact with the overhead power lines on the roof of a train and receive an electric shock and when a person receives an electric shock without touching the overhead power line after receiving an electric arc that has moved over to their body through the air. Accidents also occur when people come into contact with the trains pantograph.

Accidents have also occurred when people have attempted to create graffiti on the outside of trains and then collided with a passing object as well as people falling from a train after attempting to take a photo or selfie.

In relation to 41 train surfing accidents that occurred in Berlin between 1989–1995 it has been commented that "Collision with close-to-track obstacles and slipping from the train proved to be the major sources of danger." and there have been three medical studies that have conducted research into the different types of electrical burns injuries that people have received after they were train surfing on the roof of a train and they either came into contact with the overhead power lines or received an electric shock from an electric arc.

=== Electric arcs ===
Overhead power lines on the roofs of trains are able to create electric arcs meaning that a person does not need to make contact with the power line to receive an electric shock. In 2013 Julius Gerhardt was spraying graffiti on freight carriages when he climbed on top of a carriage to tag a bridge. He was holding a spray can in his right hand, and an electric arc jumped over to the spray can and went through his hand, arm, and chest, then exited out of his right foot. He lost consciousness and was then lifted up and carried to a street by the people who were with him. He was in a coma in hospital for 36 hours, and then later put into a medically induced coma for a week. He received burns to over 90% of his body. Gerhardt commented that "I didn't know about arcs. In the arc, like lightning, electricity is conducted through the air. I had the spray can in my right hand. When I raised my hand, the metal became an antenna. The air transmitted the voltage—and I flew off the train car." It has further been commented that "...it is quite possible that from a distance of one meter, a breakdown [electric arc] will occur on a wristwatch, a phone in a pocket or a belt buckle, that is, on any metal object."

For an electric arc to occur there does not need to be a metallic object on a persons body as the high amount of water in human bodies is enough to create an electric arc and it has been commented that in Moscow when people are riding "...on the roof of an electric train, there is a risk of injury due to electric shock at a distance of up to 1.5 meters from the high-voltage contact wire. That is, to receive a strong electric shock, it is not necessary to touch the wire - it is enough to be in close proximity. The nominal voltage of the contact wire is 3000 volts. Under operating conditions, it varies from 2000 to 4000 volts. The distance at which the electric current strikes varies depending on the voltage in the contact network and climatic conditions - for example, humidity or air temperature."

In 2013 a 15 year-old was train surfing in Scotland when an electric arc jumped over to his body from overhead power lines. He was taken to hospital and was in a critical but stable condition, and it was thought that he had not "...touched the cables but was struck by an arc of electricity after getting too close to the wires." In 2012, a 17-year-old in Ebersberg climbed onto the roof of a train; after the train moved a few metres, he was hit by an electric arc, and the train stopped moving due to a short circuit. He fell off the side of the train and received burns to 75% of his body. He was put into an artificial coma and was in a very critical condition. At the time of the accident it was commented that "The current radiates from a cable like that up to 1.5 meters away. This is called an arc. So you don't even have to touch the line directly to get an electric shock...".

=== Injuries and deaths ===
In the decade before August 2000, in Brazil, there were 100 people who died in more than 200 accidents.

In South Africa in 2006, 19 people died whilst train surfing with a further 100 train-surfing accidents occurring.

In Indonesia, in two years before 2008, 53 people died whilst train surfing.

In the Russian Central Federal District in 2015 there were 24 people injured whilst train surfing and in 2016 in the Central Federal District there were 9 people who died whilst train surfing.

In New York, from 1989 to 2011, there were 13 people who died and 56 people injured train surfing. In 2024, at least five people died in the city as a result of subway surfing. In 2025, two girls aged 12 and 13 were found on the roof of an NYC Subway train, unconscious and nonresponsive. They were both later pronounced deceased, with authorities attributing their deaths to subway surfing.

In Ukraine, in 2017, twelve people died whilst train surfing.

== Prevention and punishments ==
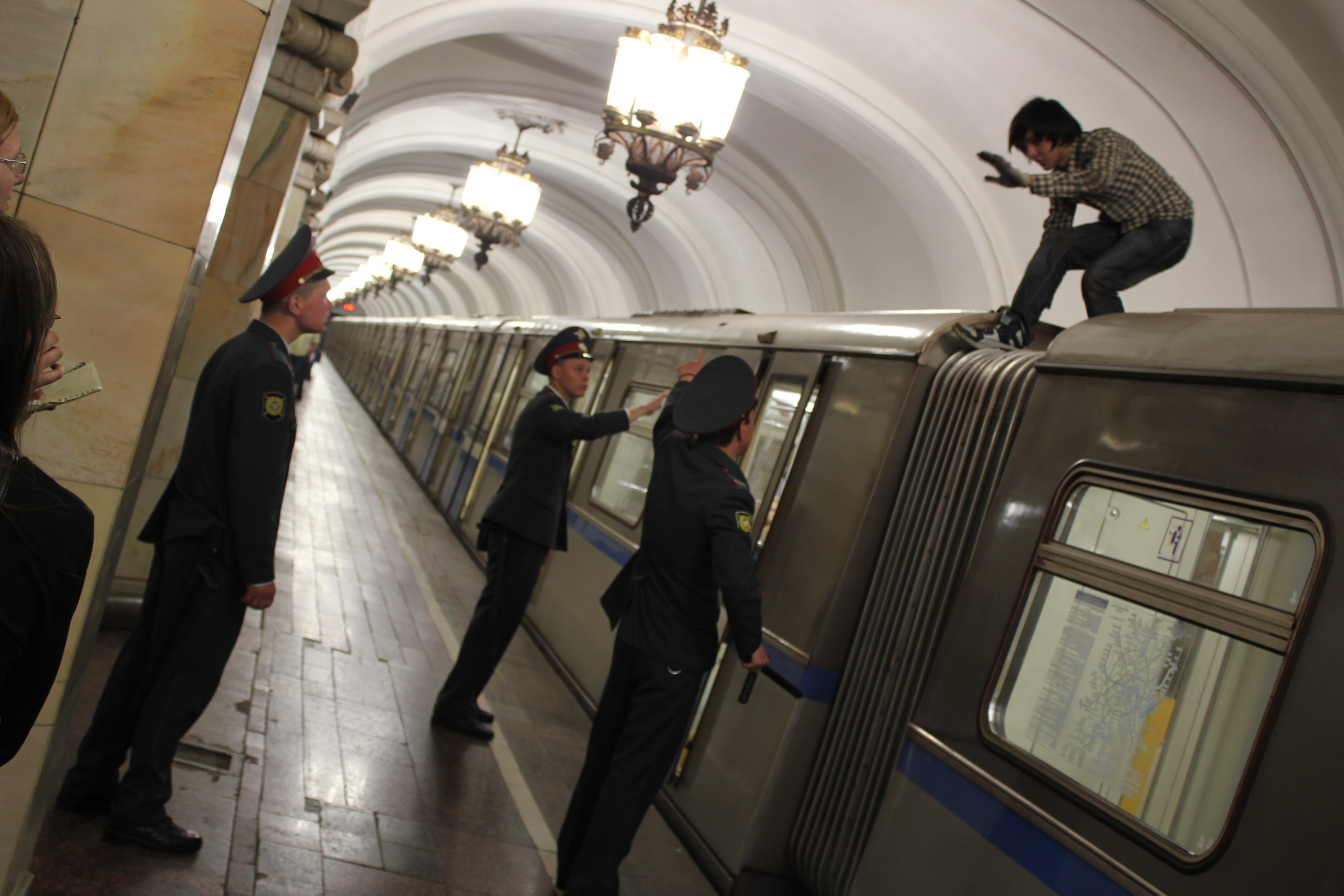
Police arrest a train surfer on the Moscow Metro

Train surfing is illegal in most jurisdictions of the world. Many railways take a zero tolerance policy to practice of riding on exterior parts of trains, and employ railway police and guards in an attempt to prevent the practice. Police officers and guards usually patrol the territory of large passenger stations and freight yards, and can arrest train surfers if they are spotted. In some countries, railway police can patrol the territory of railways in utility trucks, SUVs ("bullmobiles"), or even standard police cars. In countries where the practice of trains surfing occurs regularly, the police frequently organize raids in order to detect surfers so that they can be removed and arrested. The most common form of penalty for train surfers is a fine. However, in some countries, such as the United States or Canada, train surfers can be both fined and imprisoned.

In the United Kingdom, train surfing is prohibited under railway byelaw No. 10, which prohibits travelling in or on any train except in areas of the train intended for use by that person.

At least 87 people were arrested in the last four months of 2010 on Melbourne's railways for offences relating to train surfing. In Russia, over 1000 train surfers were arrested at the Moscow Railway during ten months of 2011. In India, 153 people were prosecuted in a single day in June 2012 for train surfing on the Central Railway.

=== Deterrents ===
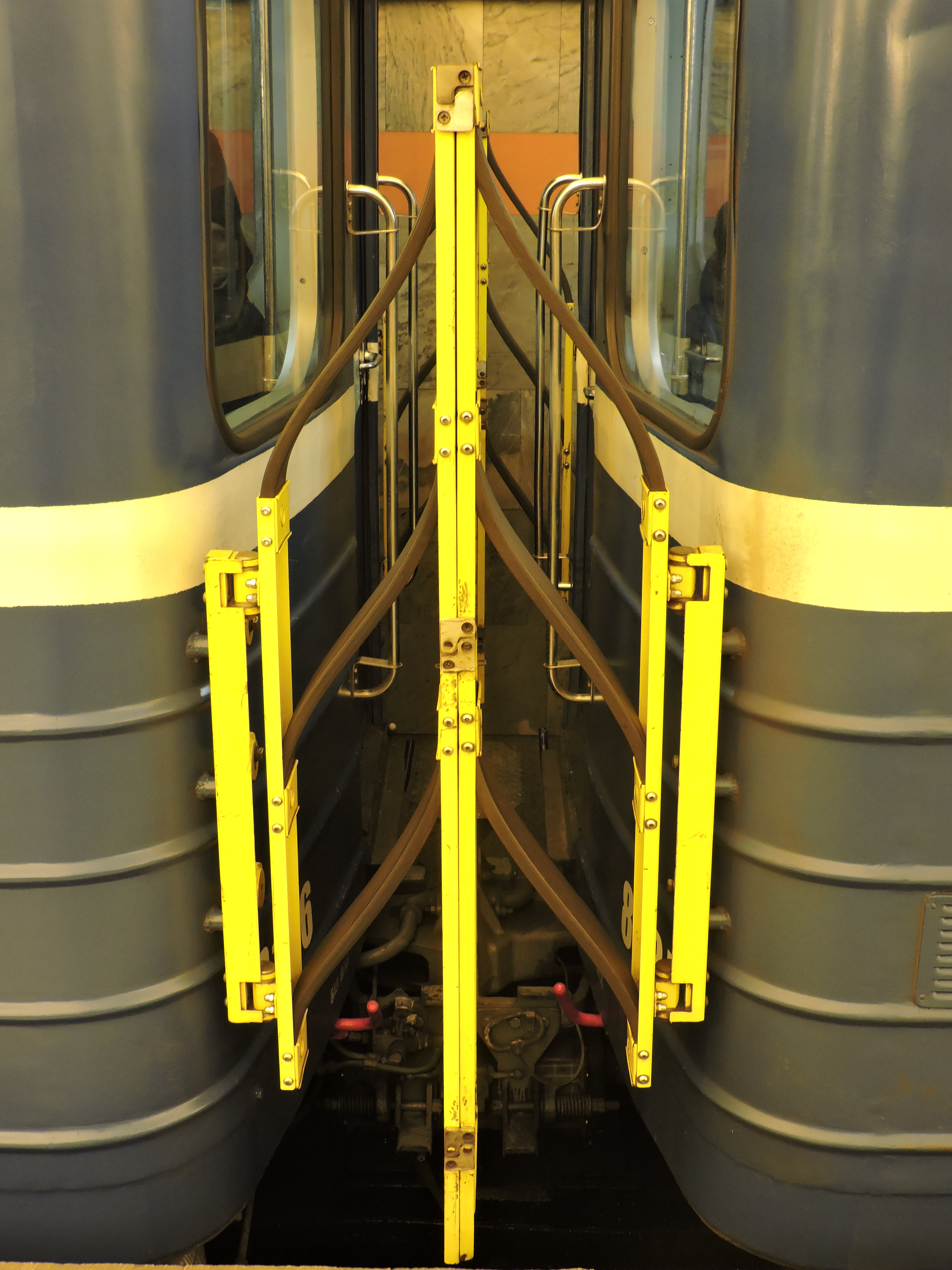
Fencing between the carriages of an 81-717/714 train which prevents passengers from falling into the gap and also impedes climbing between them

To reduce the practice of riding on the outside of trains, railway companies often place signs that warn about the dangers of train surfing. While there are no official numbers, in 2007, the London Underground ran a public awareness campaign against "tube surfing".

The Indonesian railway company, PT Kereta Api, has tried several methods to deter train surfers. Early methods included spraying those caught with red paint and placing barbed wire on train roofs. In 2012, the company began suspending heavy concrete balls above the railway, a short distance from the stations. This method was criticised as being potentially lethal.

== See also ==
- Car surfing
- Elevator surfing
- Freight Train Riders of America
- List of graffiti and street-art injuries and deaths
- List of train-surfing injuries and deaths
- Rail suicide
- Railfan
- Subway Surfers, a 2012 endless runner mobile game involving train surfing
- Surfing Soweto, a 2010 South African documentary about train surfing
