= Kalushi =

- theatrical release poster
- Directed by: Mandla Dube
- Written by: Mandla Dube; Leon Otto
- Starring: Thabo Rametsi; Thabo Malema; Welile Nzuza; Jafta Mamabolo; Louw Venter; Fumani Shilubana; Pearl Thusi; Gcina Mhlophe; Marcel van Heerden; Murray Todd
- Release dates: 18 June 2016 (Durban International Film Festival); 10 March 2017
- Country: South Africa
- Budget: R20 million
- Box office: R2.3 million

Kalushi is a 2016 South African film about Solomon Kalushi Mahlangu, a nineteen-year-old hawker from the streets of Mamelodi, a township outside Pretoria in South Africa. He was born in Pretoria on 10 July in 1956, the second son of Martha Mahlangu. His father left him in 1962, and from then on only saw him infrequently. His mother was a domestic worker and took sole responsibility for his upbringing. The film is based on a true story.

== Plot ==
Kalushi is brutally beaten by the police. He goes into exile following the 1976 Soweto uprisings to join the liberation movement. He returns from military training in Angola. En route to their mission, his friend and comrade, Mondy, loses control and shoots two innocent people on Goch Street in Johannesburg. Mondy is severely beaten and tortured; Kalushi is forced to stand trial under the common purpose doctrine.

The state seeks the highest punishment from the court, death by hanging. Kalushi has his back against the wall and uses the courtroom as a final battlefield. His sacrifice immortalises him into a hero of the struggle and a national icon of the youth joining Umkhonto we Sizwe.

== Cast ==
Actor	Role
Thabo Rametsi	Solomon Mahlangu
Thabo Malema	Mondy
Welile Nzuza	Tommy London
Jafta Mamabolo	Lucky
Louw Venter	Van Heerden
Fumani Shilubana	Lucas Mahlangu
Pearl Thusi	Brenda Riviera
Gcina Mhlophe	Martha Mahlangu
Marcel Van Heerden	Judge Theron
Murray Todd	Mr. Mailer
Clive Scott	Mr. Bragg
Lawrence Joffe	Heller
Shika Budhoo	Priscilla Jana
Kaseran Pillay	Dawood
Mona Monyane	Comrade Eve
Ryan Dittman	Mr. Hartog
Zweli Dube	Comrade Papers
Buyile Mdladla	Gebuza
Siphiwe Nkosi	Damoyi
Anton Dekker	Minister of Police
Gary D'Alessandro	Commander Esperanza
Bhekisisa Mkhwane	Jacob Zuma
Thembalethu Ntuli	Coca-Cola
Wandile Molebatsi	Cousin Phineus
Dan Robbertse	Colonel Breytenbach
Jacques van Jaarsveld	Ester De Wet
Matt Stern	Wouter Wolmarans
Jacques de Silva	Frelimo Soldier 1
Mpho Magapi	Solomon's Teacher
Reginah Dube	Sis Lindi
Denial Honeyball	Court Stenographer
Martin Le Maitre	Prison Commissioner
Masoja Msiza	Rev. Ndlovu
Thami Mzaku	Bra Frank
Daniel Du Preez	Swaziland Customs Officer
Lawrence-Lee Thorpe	Pretoria Central Prison Warder 1
Samuel Manuel Hauze	MPLA Soldier-Angola Execution
Markus Haywood	White Comrade in Bungalow
Johann van Rensburg	Court Orderly
Asia Mahomed	Record Bar Merchant
Jaden Naidoo	Indian Boy
Renus Muller	Policeman 1
Chris Barnard	Supreme Court Policeman
Jacobus Smit	Court Illustrator
Simao Domingos	Frelimo Commander-Rescue
Siphamandla Dlamini	Pretoria Maximum Warden
Mandlakayise Walter Dube Jnr	Studio Photographer
