= Ms. Kanyin =

- Directed by: Jerry Ossai
- Written by: Yemi Adeyemi, Tamara Aihie, Musa Jeffrey David
- Produced by: Ajua Abiye Dickson, Joshua Enakarhire
- Starring: Temi Otedola Michelle Dede, Toluwani George, Kanaga Eme Jnr, Natse Jemide, Aduke Shittabey
- Production company: Nemsia Studios
- Distributed by: Amazon Prime Video
- Release date: 27 June 2025
- Country: Nigeria

Ms. Kanyin is a 2025 Nigerian supernatural horror film directed by Ikechukwu Jerry Ossai and produced by Ajua Abiye Dickson and Joshua Enakarhire, under Nemsia Studios. The film stars Temi Otedola, Michelle Dede, Toluwani George, Kanaga Eme Jr, Natse Jemide, and Aduke Shittabey, among others. It was released exclusively on Amazon Prime Video on 27 June 2025, and has remained in Nigeria's top‑10 streaming rankings since its debut.

== Plot summary ==
Amara, a final-year student at an elite boarding school in Offa, Kwara State, desperately needs to improve her French grade to secure her conditional admission to Harvard. After her French teacher, Ms. Kanyin, refuses to help her cheat by revealing WAEC exam questions, Amara and her friends—Uti, Lami, Fiona, Finditae, and Chisom—plan a break‑in to steal the papers while Ms. Kanyin is away. Their plan fails; in the ensuing chaos, Ms. Kanyin is chased by a dog into a forbidden forest, falls, and dies on a mystical Tree of Life. Her blood awakens an ancient curse, and she returns as a vengeful ghost—Madame Koi‑Koi—haunting and killing the students one by one.

Haunted by guilt, Amara, Chisom, and Teacher Mustafa seek help from a local elder. They ultimately confront the spirit and burn the cursed tree, breaking the curse. The film ends with Amara taking her French exam honestly, having learned a powerful lesson.

== Production and themes ==
Produced by Nemsia Studios, a Lagos‑based production company founded by Derin Adeyokunnu and BB Sasore, known for works including Before 30 (2015), Breath of Life (2023), Banana Island Ghost (2017), and Suky (2025). The narrative explores the destructive cost of academic pressure, the consequences of moral compromise, and the enduring power of Nigerian urban legends such as the Madam Koi‑Koi ghost myth.

== Cast ==
- Temi Otedola as Amara
- Michelle Dede as Ms. Kanyin
- Toluwani George as Chisom
- Kanaga Eme Jr as Finditae
- Natse Jemide as Uti
- Aduke Shittabey as Fiona
- Damilola Bolarinde as Lami
- Adedamola Adedoyin as Teacher Mustafa
- Kalu Ikeagwu as Principal
- Keppy Ekpenyong Bassey as Uti's father
- Nosa Alakiri as Uti's mother
- Blessing Onwukwe as Amara's mother
- Francis Onwuchei as Amara's father
