= The Fire and the Moth =

- Directed by: Taiwo Egunjobi
- Produced by: Emiola Fagbenle
- Starring: Tayo Faniran, Jimmy Jean-Louis, Ini Dima-Okojie, Olarotimi Fakunle, William Benson
- Production company: Nemsia Studios
- Distributed by: Amazon Prime Video
- Release date: 3 June 2025
- Languages: English, Yoruba, French

The Fire and the Moth is a 2025 Nigerian film directed by Nigerian author Taiwo Egunjobi, written by Isaac Ayodeji, and produced by Emiola Fagbenle. It was produced by Nemsia Studios, co‑produced with Sable Productions, and distributed internationally via Amazon Prime Video, debuting on 3 June 2025.

== Plot ==
The story follows Saba, a small-time smuggler in a remote community in western Nigeria, who is tasked with moving a stolen Ife bronze head across the border. The job unravels when a corrupt police officer, Opa Stephens, kills the thieves involved in the heist and turns on Saba, forcing him to flee.

Saba hides out in the derelict home of two mysterious sisters. A ruthless enforcer known only as the Contractor, dispatched by European art collector Francois, hunts him down. A determined customs officer, Teriba Bello, emerges as another force pursuing the artifact. With danger at every turn, Saba must navigate betrayal, violence, and moral compromise to survive and free himself from the consequences of trafficking sacred art.

== Cast ==
Leads

- Tayo Faniran as Saba
- Jimmy Jean‑Louis as Contractor
- Olarotimi Fakunle as Opa Stephens
- Ini Dima‑Okojie as Abike
- William Benson as Teriba Bello

Supporting

- Amanda Ugoh as Arike
- Kuchi Chris as Queen
- Olufemi Samuel Ademiluyi as Oga Ibrahim
- Dami Deremi as Akinloye
- Olatubosun Odunsi as Saba's father
- Keppy Ekpenyong Bassey as Alimi Tanko
- Ronya Man as Lisa Brennan
- Awoyomi Akorede Yemi, Adedeji Busayo Michael, Abayomi Agboade, Israel Joshua, and Martin Nwachukwu appear in additional roles.

== Production ==
The film was produced by Nemsia Studios in collaboration with Sable Productions. Nemsia Studios is known for works such as Before 30 (2015), Banana Island Ghost (2017), God Calling (2018), Breath of Life (2023), and Suky (2025).

== Release and Reception ==
The Fire and the Moth premiered in festival programming during 2025 and was part of NollywoodWeek/NOW Film Festival programming. The film received a 7/10 rating.
