= After 30 =

- Directed by: Omorinsojo Spaine
- Produced by: Ronke Ayeni
- Starring: Damilola Adegbite Beverly Naya Meg Otanwa Anee Icha
- Production company: Nemsia Studios
- Distributed by: Amazon Prime Video
- Release date: 9 May 2025
- Country: Nigeria
- Language: English

After 30 is a 2025 Nigerian romantic drama film directed by Momo Spaine and produced by Ronke Ayeni for Nemsia Studios. The film stars Damilola Adegbite, Beverly Naya, Meg Otanwa, and Anee Icha in leading roles, alongside OC Ukeje and Patrick Doyle. It was released globally via Amazon Prime Video on May 9, 2025.

The film serves as a direct sequel to the 2015 Nigerian television series Before 30, picking up the lives of the same four women in their thirties, now navigating new challenges such as fertility, divorce, career burnout, and personal growth.

== Plot ==
After 30 continues the journey of four dynamic women—Temi, Nkem, Aisha, and Ama—now in their thirties and living in Lagos, Nigeria. No longer defined by the race to marry, they confront a new phase of life filled with complex realities: strained relationships, shifting careers, societal pressure around fertility, and the search for fulfillment.

Through the lens of Temi, a hopeless romantic facing career and identity shifts, the film explores themes of personal reinvention, emotional healing, and the evolving definitions of happiness, success, and womanhood. As each woman grapples with lingering insecurities and changing aspirations, After 30 becomes a reflective coming-of-age story about what happens when timelines fade and expectations shift.

== Cast ==
=== Main Cast ===
- Damilola Adegbite as Temi
- Beverly Naya as Nkem
- Meg Otanwa as Aisha
- Anee Icha as Ama

=== Supporting Cast ===
- OC Ukeje
- Patrick Doyle
- Tunbosun Aiyedehin
- Tina Mba
- Samuel Asaah
- Atlanta Johnson
- Celestina Aleobua
- Fadekemi Olumide
- Isaac Olayiwola (Layi Wasabi)

== Production ==
After 30 was produced by Nemsia Studios, a Nigerian production company. The studio is also behind titles such as Breath of Life, Before 30, and God Calling. The film marks Momo Spaine’s directorial debut, following her work as a producer on Banana Island Ghost (2017) and The Wait (2021).

== Release and reception ==
The film premiered on Amazon Prime Video on May 9, 2025, and achieved commercial success, debuting at number one in Nigeria within 24 hours of release. It maintained a top-ten position on the platform for a full week. Audiences praised its emotional depth, character continuity from Before 30, and its realistic portrayal of modern Nigerian womanhood.

== Relationship to Before 30 ==
After 30 is a sequel to the Nigerian television series Before 30, which aired in 2015. The original series followed four young women in Lagos as they approached the societal milestone of marriage before the age of 30. After 30 revisits with the same characters years later, examining the evolution of their lives after they have passed that age, with new personal, relational, and societal challenges.
