= Otedola =

Ọ̀tẹ́dọlá
- Gender: Male
- Language: Yoruba

Origin
- Origin: Nigerian
- Meaning: Intrigues become wealth.
- Region of origin: South West, Nigeria

Ọ̀tẹ́dọlá audio is a Nigerian surname. It is a male name and of Yoruba origin, which means "Intrigues become wealth.".

The name Ọ̀tẹ́dọlá is common among the Ijebu people of the Southwest, Nigeria.

Notable people with the surname include:

- Femi Otedola (born 1962), Nigerian businessman, entrepreneur philanthropist.
- Sir Michael Otedola (1926–2014), Nigerian politician and the former Governor of Lagos State, Nigeria.
- Florence Ifeoluwa Otedola (born 1992), Nigerian DJ.
- Temi Otedola (born 1996), Nigerian actress and fashion blogger.
