= Headless =

Headless may refer to:

== Science and technology ==
=== Medicine ===
- Acephalic acardia, a type of twin reversed arterial perfusion in which one twin is born without a head
- Acrania, missing cranial bones
- Anencephaly, absence of a major part of the brain and skull
- Decapitation, the severing of the whole head from the body

=== Computing ===
In computing and software, headless can either refer to software or servers without a graphical interface, or software platforms that decouple front- and back-end components.

- Headless computer, a server with no monitor, keyboard, or mouse attached
- Headless software, software capable of working on a device without a graphical user interface
- Headless browser, a web browser without a graphical user interface
- Headless CMS, a backend-only content management system that employs APIs to display content

=== Linguistics ===
- Headless phrase, a term in linguistics for a phrase with no head

=== Geology ===
- Headless Formation, a geologic formation in Northwest Territories

== Arts and entertainment ==
- Headless (TV series) a British television series starring Patrick Robinson and Ginny Holder
- Headless, a foe in Ultima
- Headless, NPCs in The Matrix Online
- Headless (2015 film), a horror film by Arthur Cullipher
- Headless (2024 film), a Nigerian film
- Headless (band), an Italian hard rock band
- Mike the Headless Chicken (non-fiction), a Wyandotte chicken that lived for 18 months after his head had been cut off
- "Headless", a song by Joe Satriani from his album Flying in a Blue Dream
- "Headless", a song by Hella from the album Tripper
- Stree 2: Sarkate Ka Aatank (lit. 'Stree 2: Terror of the Headless'), a 2024 Indian film

=== Literature and myths ===
- Headless line, a form of catalexis omitting an initial syllable
- Headless men, a mythical headless humanoid creature
- Headless Horseman (disambiguation)
- Headless Horseman
