= Before 30 =

- Genre: Drama
- Written by: Bodunrin 'BB' Sasore
- Directed by: Bodunrin 'BB' Sasore
- Starring: Damilola Adegbite; OC Ukeje; Beverly Naya; Meg Otanwa; Anee Icha
- Narrated by: Damilola Adegbite
- Country of origin: Nigeria
- Original language: English
- No. of seasons: 1
- No. of episodes: 8

Production
- Executive producer: Derin Adeyokunnu Tonjé Bakang
- Producer: Omorinsojo Akinnola
- Production locations: Lagos, Lagos State, Nigeria
- Cinematography: Ola Cardoso
- Running time: 30 minutes
- Production company: Nemsia Studios

Original release
- Network: Africa Magic
- Release: 29 March 2015 – present

Before 30, also known as B430, is a Nigerian television drama series directed by Bodunrin 'BB' Sasore and starring Damilola Adegbite, OC Ukeje, Beverly Naya, Meg Otanwa and Anee Icha. The show, which is sponsored by Airtel and shot in Lagos, started airing on DStv's Africa Magic on 29 March 2015. First Bank is also a co-sponsor of the show.

The drama series is centred on "the lives of four young and urban career women in Lagos as they face pressures from society and culture, their peers, and family members on the condition to be married before they turn 30". The series explores their struggles to balance personal desires with family expectations and the challenges of finding true love in a culture that prioritizes marriage.

== Cast and characters ==
=== Main characters ===
- Damilola Adegbite as Temilola Coker, a 27-year-old lawyer and the only child of the Coker family. She tries daily to balance her own desire to find true love with the pressure from family to just be married.
- OC Ukeje as Ayo, Temi's high school lover, who sees marriage as an unnecessary distraction at the present stage in his career. He is in love with Temi but unable to pay enough attention to her emotional needs.
- Beverly Naya as Nkem, the sexy and fun career woman who believes men are simply playthings. She is very blunt and direct.
- Meg Otanwa as Aisha, a young woman from a conservative Muslim family, who has never really been able to choose who she wants to be. She is married to a wealthy man, but she's trying to adjust to the ups and downs of marriage.
- Anee Icha as Ama, a free-spirited lady, the youngest in the group with a rosy outlook on life. She is very spiritual and is not afraid to share her faith with anyone.

=== Recurring characters ===
- Karibi Fubara as Akin, a 35-year-old single sociologist. He is a kindhearted humanitarian but doesn't have the best track record with relationships. He is, however, willing to change and settle down when he meets Temi.
- Patrick Diabuah as Sheriff, a 31-year-old billionaire heir to an oil and gas empire. He is married to Aisha and is a man with old-fashioned Northern values, despite his western education. He is generous and smart but has a sense of entitlement that comes with growing up in the upper class.
- Gideon Okeke
- Patrick Doyle
- Tina Mba as Aisha's mother

=== Guest appearances ===
- Zainab Balogun
- Tunbosun Aiyedehin
- Vimbai Mutinhiri
- Kenneth Okoli
- Ebisan
- Demola Adedoyin

== Production and release ==
Produced by Nemsia Studios, a Nigerian production company focused on African storytelling across film, television, and digital platforms—with a catalogue that includes Breath of Life, Before 30, A Green Fever, Soft Love, and Suky—the series explores the challenges faced by the average single Nigerian woman in her pursuit of marriage. Each character represents different social, physical, economic, religious, and cultural perspectives, offering a range of experiences that reflect the diversity of Nigerian womanhood. Pre-production for the first season of the show began in March 2012 with casting calls and auditions, which took 6 months. The casts for the four lead actresses were finalized in June 2013, and principal photography started in February 2014. Most parts of the season were at the Federal Palace Hotel, Lagos, which is one of the show's sponsors. shooting ended in April 2014. According to the producers, the series costs approximately ₦7 million ($45,000) per episode.

Character posters of Before 30 were released online in February 2015. The official trailer was also released during the period. The series premiered at Federal Palace Hotel on 20 March 2015, and started airing on DStv's Africa Magic on 29 March 2015; it was initially scheduled to start airing on 22 March but was postponed to 29. The series is also aired on other cable and terrestrial television channels, such as: ELTV, Silverbird, Sound City, amongst other channels. Before 30 is currently available for streaming on Demand Africa.

It started streaming on Netflix on November 24, 2020.

== Sequel ==
A sequel titled After 30 was released, continuing the story of the original characters years later. The film premiered globally on May 9, 2025 via Amazon Prime Video. It follows the same four women—Temi, Nkem, Aisha, and Ama—now navigating life in their thirties as they deal with new challenges such as career burnout, fertility issues, divorce, and personal growth.
