= Emiola Fagbenle =

- Pronunciation: E- MI - Ọ- LA
- Occupations: Film Editor and Producer
- Known for: All na Vibes
- Notable work: The Fire and The Moth

Emiola Fagbenle is a film editor and producer from Nigeria. She runs a production company named Sable Media based in Lagos. She has worked in Nigeria Studios like the Anthill Studios, Inkblot Productions, and Ndani TV including cinema blockbusters, Up-North, Setup, and Who's the Boss.

== Nominations ==
Emiola was nominated in 2020 in AMVCA nomination as the Best Picture Editor for his work on Elevator Baby

== Works ==
- All Na Vibes
- Day of Destiny
- A Green Fever
- Baby Maker
- The Fire and The Moth
