= Abdulwasiu Sowami =

Abdulwasiu Sowami (born 31 August 1971) is a Nigerian businessman and philanthropist. He is the Group Executive Chairman of Ardova PLC and a member of the Institute of Directors, Nigeria. He founded the Abdullateef and Sanni Foundation and also serves as the Chairman of Ignite Investments and Commodities Limited. According to the Naira metrics, he is often referred to as the "silent billionaire".

== Business career ==
Sowami began his career with Besse Oil and Services Limited, after which he moved to Cosmos Oil Limited, and later to Ignite Energy Limited.

In 2019, Sowami acquired Femi Otedola’s 74.02% controlling stake in Forte Oil PLC. The acquisition was executed through Ignite Investments and Commodities Limited, an investment vehicle of Sowami's flagship company, Prudent Energy and Services Limited. Following the acquisition, the company was officia rebranded from Forte Oil PLC to Ardova PLC in February 2020.

Not long after, Enyo, which was established in 2009 and had a total of 95 filling stations across Nigeria, was acquired by Prudent Energy, owned by Sowami, with a 100% equity stake.

In 2024, his company, Ardova Plc, commissioned a new state-of-the-art lubricant blending plant in Lagos with an annual production capacity of 150 million litres and a storage capacity of 14 million litres. This milestone was announced during the AP Lubricant Distributors’ Forum, where it was emphasized that the facility aims to meet the growing market demand and strengthen partnerships with distributors. Sowami stated that the plant, capable of producing 20% of Nigeria’s lubricant needs, reflects the company’s commitment to innovation and national development.

== Philanthropy ==
In 2019, Sowami’s company, then Prudent Energy, invested in the Handball Federation of Nigeria under its president, Sam Ocheho. Prudent Energy sponsored the National Handball League, which was in its second year of a five-year deal. Sowami praised Ocheho’s leadership for revitalizing the sport, reaffirmed his company’s commitment to supporting handball, and urged other private firms to invest in its growth in Nigeria and beyond.

== Personal life and education ==
Sowami is married and blessed with seven children. He holds a bachelor's degree in Sociology from the University of Maiduguri, Borno State and MSc. in Corporate governance from Leeds Beckett University, United Kingdom.
