= Ola Cardoso =

Nigerian cinematographer and film director

- Occupations: Filmmaker, cinematographer
- Years active: 2011-present

Ola Cardoso is a Nigerian cinematographer, creative director and music video director best known for his works on the films, The Blood Covenant, Banana Island Ghost and Breathe of Life, which won the AMVCA 2024 for Best Movie. He is also the founder of Film Bank Production, a film production company in Nigeria.

In 2023, he featured in Breath of Life, which received 11 nominations in different categories for the AMVCA 10th edition.

== Cinematography ==
- Breath of Life (2023)
- Slum King (2023)
- The Blood Covenant (2022)
- Journey of an African Colony (2019)
- Makate Must Sell (2019)
- God Calling (2018)
- Banana Island Ghost (2017)
- Before 30 (2015)

== Awards and nominations ==
Year	Award	Category	Result	Ref
2020	Africa Magic Viewers Choice Award	Best cinematographer	Nominated	
2020	Africa Magic Viewers Choice Award	Best light designer	Won	
2024	Africa Magic Viewers' Choice Awards	Best cinematographer	Nominated	
