= Mami Wata (film) =

2023 Nigerian film

- US Promotional release poster
- Directed by: C.J. "Fiery" Obasi
- Written by: C. J. "Fiery" Obasi
- Produced by: Oge Obasi
- Starring: Evelyne Ily Juhen; Uzoamaka Aniunoh; Kelechi Udegbe; Emeka Amakeze
- Cinematography: Lílis Soares
- Edited by: Nathan Delannoy
- Music by: Tunde Jegede
- Production companies: Fiery Film Company; Guguru Studios; Ifind Pictures; PalmWine Media
- Distributed by: CAA Media Finance alief SAS; Dekanalog; Aya Films; Trigon-film; Djeli Films
- Release date: 23 January 2023 (Sundance)
- Running time: 107 minutes
- Countries: Nigeria; France; United Kingdom
- Languages: West African Pidgin English; Fon

Mami Wata is a 2023 black-and-white fantasy thriller film written and directed by C.J. "Fiery" Obasi, based on West African folklore. It is a co-production between Nigeria, France and the United Kingdom.

The film premiered at the 2023 Sundance Film Festival, marking Obasi's third feature to screen at Sundance. In October 2023, it was selected as the Nigerian entry for Best International Feature Film at the 96th Academy Awards by The Nigerian Official Selection Committee (NOSC). It was nominated in the Best International Film category of the 39th Independent Spirit Awards, and in the Outstanding International Motion Picture category of the 55th NAACP Image Awards.

== Cast ==
- Evelyne Ily Juhen as Prisca
- Uzoamaka Aniunoh as Zinwe
- Kelechi Udegbe as Jabi
- Emeka Amakeze as Jasper
- Rita Edochie as Mama Efe
- Tough Bone as Ero
- Jakob Kerstan as Johnny
- C.J. Obasi as Doctor
- Tim Ebuka as Moussa
- Sofiath Sanni as Alima
- David Avincin Oparaeke as Ajah
- Hadiya Ibrahim as Oli
- Joyce Tobi Lileru as Nurse
- Monalisa Stephen as Binti

== Production ==
Obasi first came up with and began developing Mami Wata in 2016. After writing a few drafts, he took part in a number of labs to help refine the script. In an interview with CNN, Obasi stated he "wanted to make a hyper-stylised film" with its style rooted in substance, taking inspiration from his favourite filmmakers such as Akira Kurosawa and David Lynch. The characters Prisca and Zinwe were inspired by Obasi's late sisters. Production companies attached to Mami Wata include Obasi's Fiery Film Company, Guguru Studios, Palmwine Media, Swiss Fund Visions Sud Est and Ifind Pictures of France.

Principal photography took place on location in the rural villages of Benin and wrapped in January 2021.

== Reception ==
At the Sundance Film Festival, cinematographer Lílis Soares won the Special Jury Prize in the World Dramatic Competition for the film's cinematography. It also picked up three awards at FESPACO - Prix de la Critique Paulin S. Vieyra (African Critics Award), Meilleure Image (Cinematography Award) and Meilleur Décor (Set Design Award). It was acquired by Dekanalog for North American distribution.

=== Critical response ===
On the review aggregator Rotten Tomatoes, the film holds a 97% approval rating based on 38 reviews, with a critics consensus that "Visually stunning and narratively stirring, Mami Wata uses its monochromatic palette to reveal a captivating, dreamlike world.".

The Hollywood Reporter describes it as, "A vivid narrative and a dynamic study in color."IndieWire said: "The extra time spent developing the film pays off on screen: From its opening title design to the last notes of Tunde Jegede’s score, Mami Wata is a work of art." The Los Angeles Times said: "That balance between light and dark is how Obasi most potently underscores all his themes: faith and proof, tradition versus modernity, the otherworldly alongside the human, and of course, Mami Wata's power to give and take."The Wall Street Journal said: "Mr. Obasi's script elevates folklore by subtly infusing it with political implications and a sardonic outlook on feminine vs. masculine power." The New York Times Critic's Pick review said: "In Mami Wata, the archetypes are familiar, but they work to make this Nigerian film a distinctly economical masterpiece." Matt Zoller Seitz of RogerEbert.com in his review, gave it a four-star rating (the highest) saying: "The film casts a spell, and the spell persists to the end." Filmmaker Sean Baker named it one of his favorite films of 2023.

== See also ==
- List of submissions to the 96th Academy Awards for Best International Feature Film
- List of Nigerian submissions for the Academy Award for Best International Feature Film
