= Uzoamaka Power =

Nigerian actor

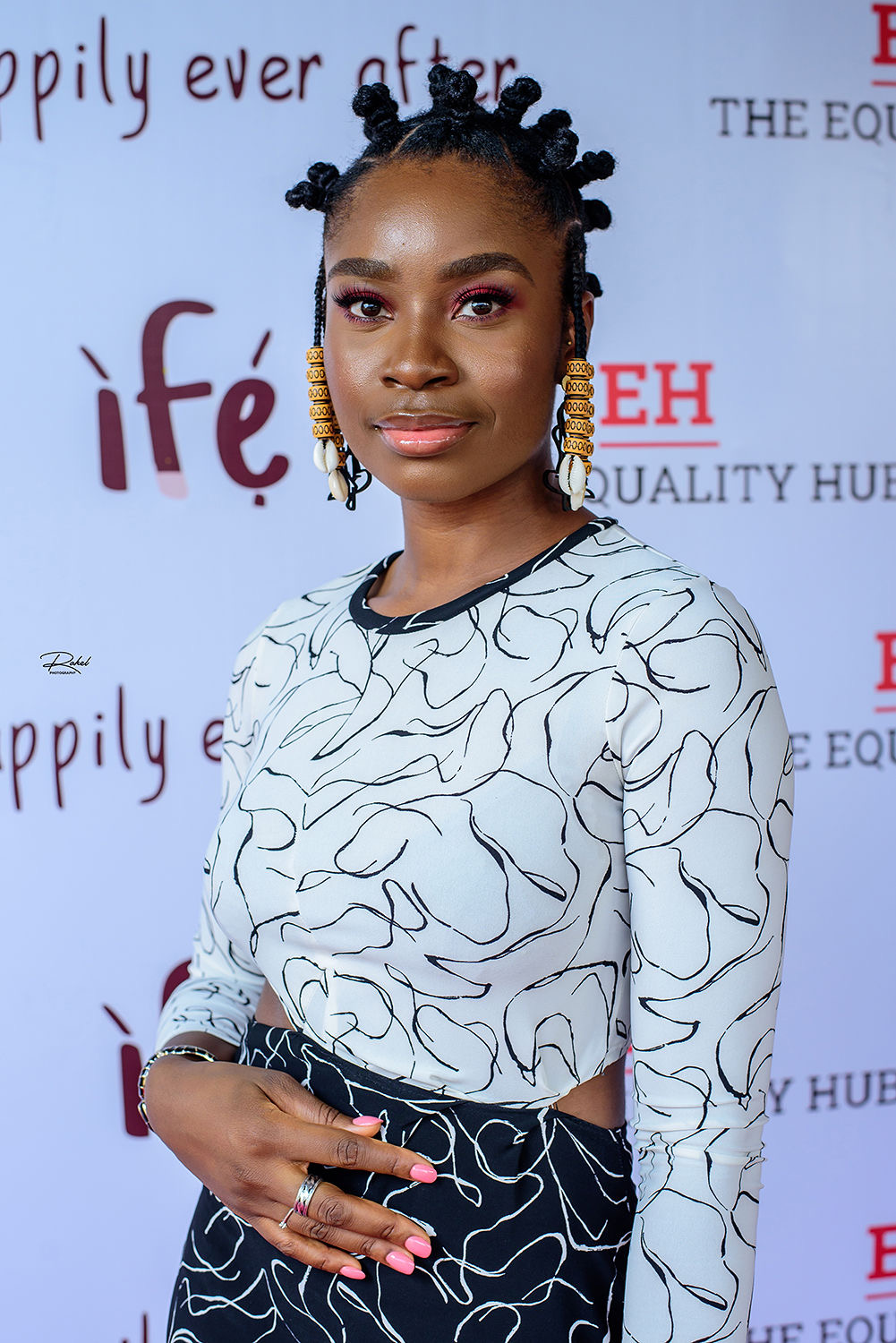
- Power in 2020
- Born: Uzoamaka Doris Aniunoh; Onitsha, Nigeria
- Education: University of Nigeria; University of Birmingham
- Occupations: Actor, writer, director.
- Known for: MTV Shuga
- Relatives: Chidinma Maryjane Aniunoh, Olive Chioma Aniunoh

Uzoamaka Power (born Aniunoh; April 10) is a Nigerian actress, writer, and director. She is known for her starring roles in films that include Call of My Life (2026), Mami Wata (2023), The Weekend (2024), and With Difficulty Comes Ease (2024).

== Early life and education ==
Power was born and raised in Onitsha. She is the eldest of four children.

She received a degree in English and history from the University of Nigeria and an MA in creative writing from the University of Birmingham.

== Career ==
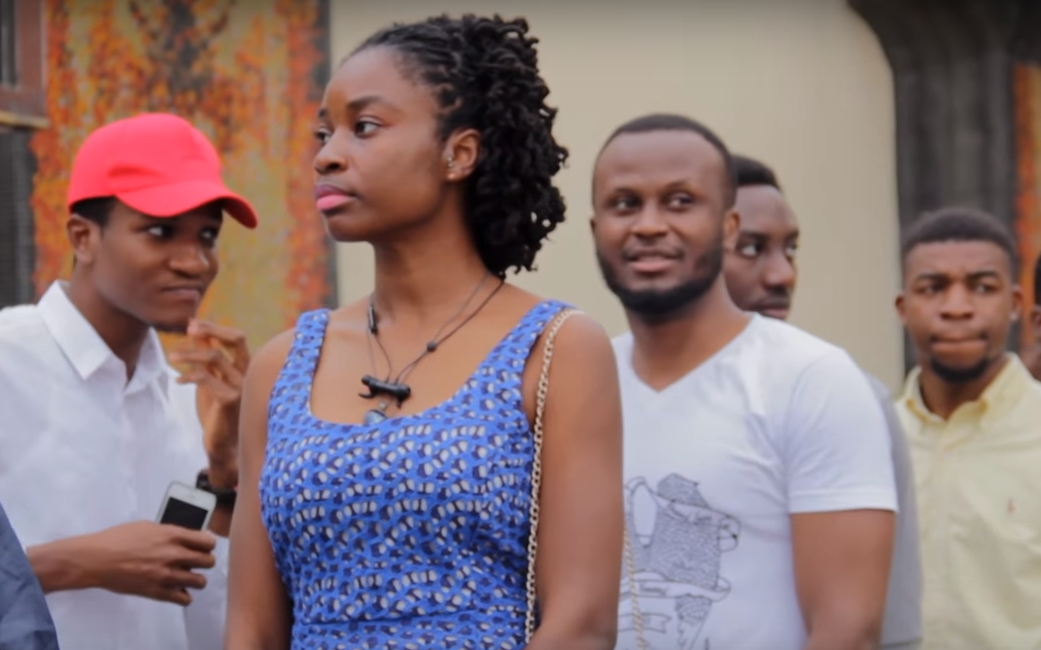
Power waiting to audition for MTV Shuga

After a two-year stay in England for her graduate studies, Power returned to Nigeria in 2017. Upon attending the open auditions for the popular series MTV Shuga, she won the role of Cynthia, and starred in the series from 2018 to 2019.

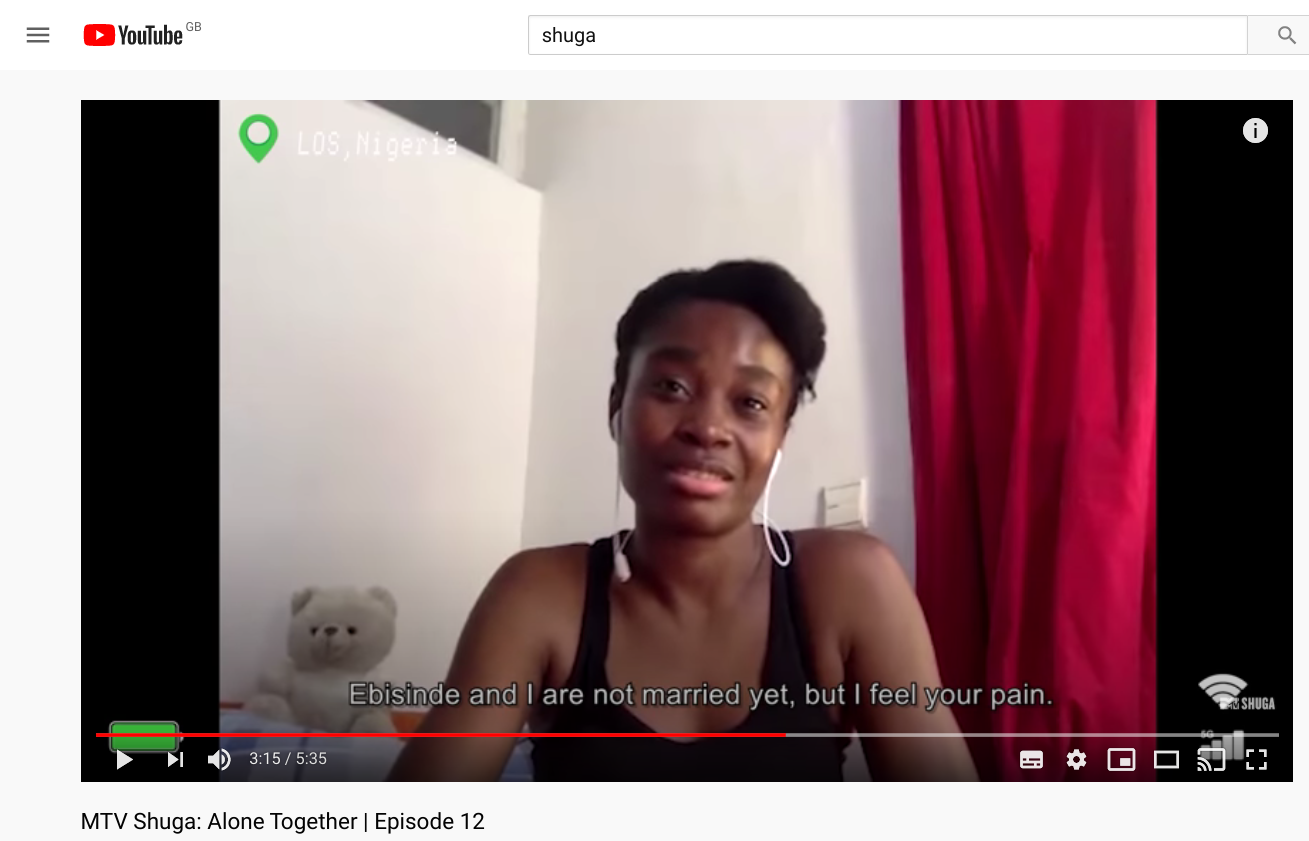
Cynthia talking on-line in "Alone Together" Episode 12

In 2020, she appeared in a special edition of the series: titled MTV Shuga Alone Together, the mini-series brought together cast members from Nigeria, Kenya, South Africa and Ivory Coast highlighting the challenges people were facing across the continent during the Coronavirus pandemic.

In 2019, she was a lead in the short film Stuck alongside Seun Ajayi and Lala Akindoju, and in 2020 appeared in Africa Magic's Riona, a period drama, one of the top five Nigerian TV series of the year. 2020 also saw her take on one of the lead roles in Ife, an LGBT love story for which she received the Kim Renders Memorial Award for Outstanding Performance from the Reelout Film Festival in 2021.

In 2021, Power was listed as a Nigerian actress to watch by Nigerian Entertainment Today. That year, she went on to appear in several shorts including in the title role of the female superhero "The Zipman" in the supernatural thriller, Ananze and the Zipman, Sister Rose, and Title Ije. She was also named by Filmone as one of its "Box Office Breakthrough" actresses for her lead role in the comedy Ponzi.

In 2022, she starred in the Nigerian thriller Diiche, Showmax's first Nigerian original limited series. The series received seven nominations at the 2023 Africa Magic Viewers' Choice Awards including for Best Series.

In 2023, Power appeared in the fantasy thriller Mami Wata written and directed by C.J. "Fiery" Obasi. In addition to being the Nigerian entry for Best International Feature Film at the 96th Academy Awards, it received a multiple awards and a Best Supporting Actress nomination for Power at the 2023 Africa Movie Academy Awards. Also in 2023, she also made her directorial debut with Love Language, a short film about an intertribal love affair, which she also wrote and starred in.

In 2024, Power appeared in more than six films including Daniel Oriahi's thriller The Weekend, which earned her a Best Actress nomination at the 20th edition of the Africa Movie Academy Awards. In With Difficulty Comes Ease, an Amazon Prime Video feature directed by Korede Azezez, Power plays a young Igbo-Hausa widow who has to navigate both her grief and cultural expectations after losing her husband. She also appeared in Ifeoma Nkiruka Chukwuogo's Phoenix Fury, which won the Best Film and Best Director awards at the Africa International Film Festival (AFRIFF) in November 2024.

In 2025, Power appeared in a supporting role in Akinola Davies Jr.'s My Father's Shadow, the first Nigerian film to be selected for the Cannes Film Festival's Official Selection, where it won the Caméra d'Or Special Mention. Also in 2025, she wrote, directed and starred in the short film My Body, God’s Temple, part of Zikoko Life YouTube three-part anthology series of stories seen through the lens of Nigerian women's experiences. Her next film, Siraam, a coming-of-age story that she wrote and directed starring Genoveva Umeh, was released in December at the S16 Film Festival, a platform aimed at African indie filmmakers.

In 2026, she appeared in the Zikoko YouTube release Silence is Loud directed by Abba T. Makama, a film centered on the stigma surrounding HIV in Nigerian society. She next starred in the feature length romantic comedy Call of My Life directed by Dammy Twitch. Power wrote the screenplay based on her own experience working in a call center. A critical and commercial success, the film joined the ranks of Nollywood's highest-grossing films, earning more than ₦628 million within six weeks of its May 2026 release—becoming the first domestic production to exceed the ₦600 million mark outside the December release window.

=== Literary Writing ===
Power is a published fiction writer. An excerpt from her work Balcony was edited and published by the Nigerian writer Chimamanda Ngozi Adichie. Her short story The Child That I was Not was Adichie's selection for "Story of the Week" for the literary journal The Missing Slate in January 2017. The literary platform Brittle Paper also published works by Power, including Tea Glass: An African Story in 2015 and Mama Juror and Rush Green in 2017.

=== Name change ===
Born Uzoamaka Aniunoh, the actress announced in 2025 that she had adopted Power as her professional last name.

In an interview with Nollywood film outlet What Kept Me Up, she explained that Power "resonates with me on a profound level....It symbolises strength, resilience, and the energy I bring to my craft." She had been using the name informally since 2018, often as a hashtag when sharing her work on social media.

== Filmography ==
=== Film ===
Year	Title	Role	Notes
2018	Stuck	Dara Akpabio	
2020	Ife	Ife	
2020	Ananze and the Zipman		
2021	Sister Rose	Sister Rose	
2021	Ponzi	Abike	
2021	A Naija Christmas	Cassie	
2023	Mami Wata	Zinwe	
2024	Headless		
2024	A Quiet Monday	Kainene	
2024	The Weekend	Nikiya	
2024	With Difficulty Comes Ease	Zainab	
2024	Shaping Us	Zee	
2025	My Father's Shadow	Abike	
2025	My Body, God's Temple	Omasilu	
2026	Silence is Loud	Henrietta	
2026	Call of My Life	Soluchi	

=== Television ===
Year	Title	Role	Notes
TBA	MTV Shuga		
TBA	MTV Shuga Alone Together		
TBA	Rumor Has it		
2020	Riona	Kumene	
2021	Venge	Bibi	
2022	Diiche	Inspector Ijeoma Anene	

== See also ==
- List of Nigerian actors
