= Farouk Lawan =

Nigerian politician (born 1962)

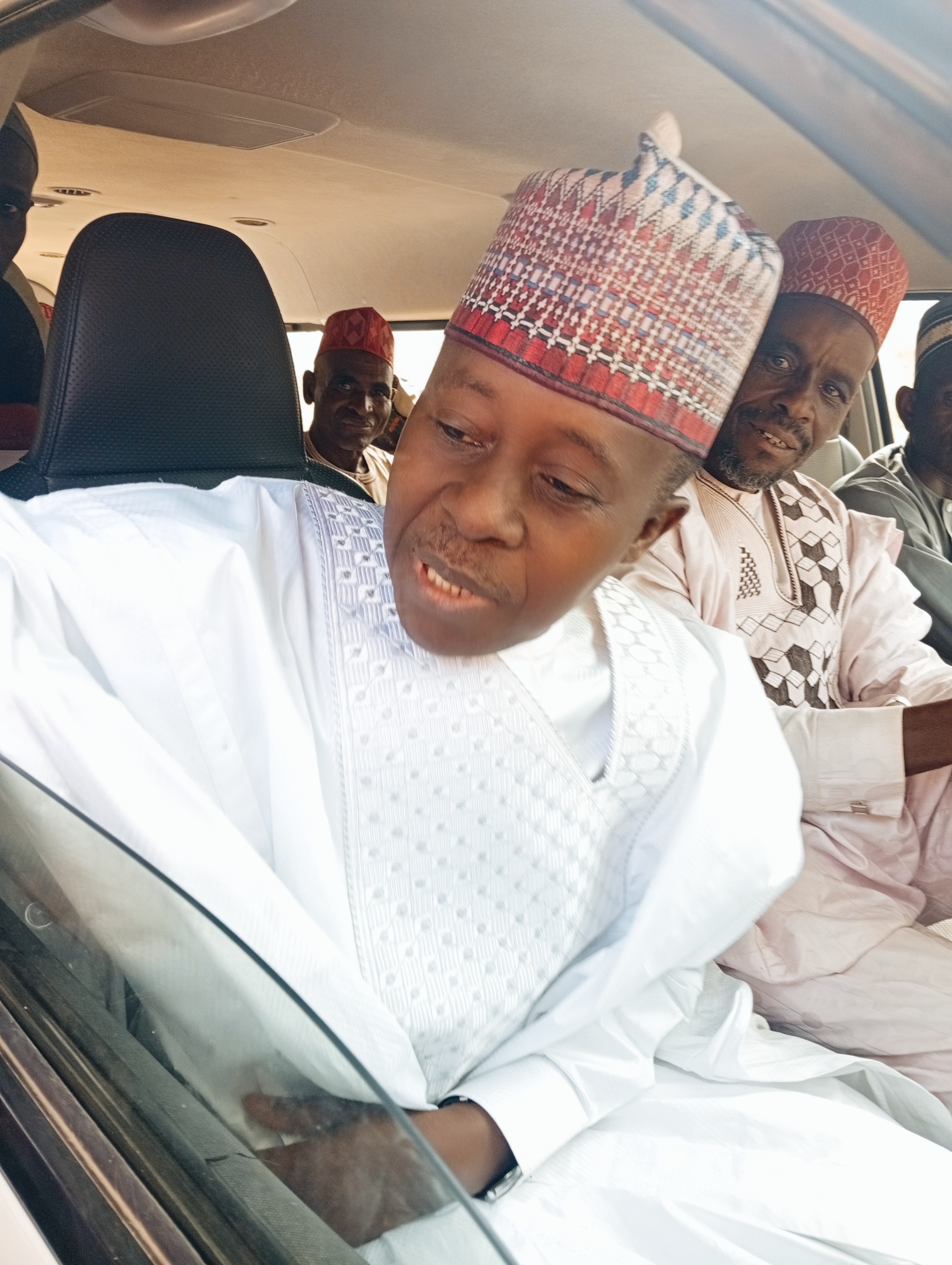

Member of the House of Representatives of Nigeria
- In office 2011–2015
- Preceded by: Yusuf Ahmed Badau

Member of the House of Representatives of Nigeria
- In office 2007–2011

Member of the House of Representatives of Nigeria
- In office 2003–2007

Member of the House of Representatives of Nigeria
- In office 1999–2003

Personal details
- Born: 6 July 1962 (age 64) Shanono Village, Kano State, Nigeria
- Party: APC
- Occupation: Academician
- Profession: Academician

Farouk Muhammad Lawan (born 6 July 1962) is a Nigerian politician and four-term (since 1999) member of the House of Representatives for the Bagwai/Shanono Federal Constituency of Kano State.

== Education and personal life ==
Lawan was born on 6 July 1962 in Shanono, Kano State, Nigeria. He attended primary and secondary schools in Kano State and later went to Bayero University, Kano, where he obtained a bachelor's degree.

Before political career, Lawan worked in academia and public administration. He served as Registrar of Kano State Polytechnic before he was first elected to the House of Representatives in 1999.

== Political career ==
A People's Democratic Party (PDP) member, Lawan was elected in 1999, 2003, 2007 and again in 2011, making it 4 times elected member. Lawan was the Chairman of the House Committee on Finance under the former Speaker Aminu Bello Masari. He identifies his legislative interests as "Appropriation, Information and Education".

During the late-2007 corruption scandal that caused the former Speaker of the House Patricia Etteh to resign, Lawan led the Integrity Group, an alliance of Representatives opposed to Etteh.

=== Fuel subsidy scandal ===
In January 2012, Lawan chaired the House of Representatives committee that investigated the Nigerian government's fuel subsidies. The committee was set up in the wake of nationwide strikes in Nigeria after President Goodluck Jonathan removed a fuel subsidy. This resulted in the increase in price of fuel. The committee's report released in April the same year revealed a huge scam in which Nigerian fuel companies were being paid hundreds of millions of dollars in subsidies by the government for fuel that was never delivered. It was estimated the scam cost the country $6.8 billion.

In February 2013, Lawan was charged with corruption after he allegedly accepted $500,000 from Femi Otedola, a Nigerian billionaire oil tycoon, as part of a $3 million bribe Lawan had solicited from Otedola. Otedola claimed that Lawan demanded the bribe in order to have his company, Zenon, removed from the list of companies that the committee had implicated in the scandal. The initial fuel subsidy report said that Zenon owed more than $1 million to the government, but legislators later voted to remove the firm from the final report. Lawan said that he accepted the money in order to expose blackmail and informed the committee and Economic and Financial Crimes Commission (EFCC) about it.

On 22 June 2021, the trial of Farouk Lawan came to a logical conclusion as the judge, Angela Otaluka, sentenced the former federal lawmaker to seven years in prison.

Otaluka, a judge of the High Court of the Federal Capital Territory (FCT), Apo, Abuja, who jailed Lawan for corruptly demanding $3 million and eventually taking $500,000 bribe while serving as the chairman of the House of Representatives’ ad-hoc committee investigating the fraud around fuel subsidy in 2012.

In her judgment, Otaluka relied heavily on the testimony of Otedola, who described giving the $500,000 to Lawan in a sting operation planned with the State Security Service (SSS) to obtain evidence of extortion against the lawmaker. He went to the court of appeal and the sentencing was reduced to five years. The Supreme Court upheld his conviction on January 26, 2024, after he appealed the initial seven-year sentence given by the trial court. The trial court based its judgment on the testimony of Otedola, who cooperated with the State Security Service to expose Lawan’s corruption.

=== Release from Prison ===
Farouk Lawan was released from prison on 22 October 2024 after serving his sentence for accepting bribes during his tenure as a member of the Nigerian House of Representatives. His release marks the end of a high-profile case that drew significant public and media attention. The case remains one of Nigeria's most discussed political corruption scandals.
