= Madam Koi Koi =

Ghost in Nigerian urban legend

Madam Koi Koi (also known as Lady Koi Koi and Madam Moke in Ghana) is a Nigerian urban legend of a vengeful ghost who is believed to haunt dormitories, hallways and toilets in boarding schools at night; in day schools, she haunts toilets and students who come to school too early or leave school late. She is often depicted wearing a pair of red heels or wearing a single heel. She is one of the most popular boarding school ghosts in Nigeria.

== Etymology ==
The name "Madam Koi Koi" is taken from the sound her heels make whenever she comes to prey on students at night.

== Origin ==
There are several stories that tell the origin of Madam Koi Koi.

=== Nigeria ===
In Nigeria, she was depicted as a stylish secondary school teacher, known for her beauty and her red heels. Whenever she walked through the hallways, her shoes would make a “koi koi” sound, which is where the name Madam Koi Koi comes from. It was also said that she was extremely cruel to students and would beat them for no reason. She was dismissed after slapping a female student and damaging her ear. On her journey back home, she was involved in an accident and died. Before her death, she swore that she would take revenge on the school and its students.

Not long after, students at the secondary school claimed that at night they could hear a “koi koi” sound in the dormitory hallways after lights out, as though high heels were clicking against the floor.

In another version of the tale, she was described as a particularly wicked teacher who flogged her students at every opportunity. Some said she was a sadist who used her position as a teacher as an excuse to inflict extreme pain and suffering whenever she pleased. Her students, exhausted by the school management’s failure to discipline her, decided to take matters into their own hands. One night, as she was leaving the school, the students cornered her, gagged her to prevent her from screaming, and beat her mercilessly, killing her. Realising what they had done, they threw her body over the school’s back fence and fled, hoping witnesses would believe the injuries were caused by an armed robber.

Gradually, every student involved disappeared, except for the one who struck her with the shoe. He repeatedly told everyone what he and the others had done and claimed that he heard the sound of high heels clacking through his hostel every night, believing it meant she was coming for him. However, no one believed him. One night, he decided to investigate the source of the sound, but he was beaten to death, and his body was found the following morning.

The school was eventually shut down, and all the students were transferred to new schools. They later spread the legend to their new schools. It is said that she still walks the hostel corridors at night, tormenting students and causing anyone who looks at her to disappear.

== Activities ==
Madam Koi Koi is primarily known for haunting school premises with activities that range from opening school doors, singing, and whistling to attacking people in restrooms or slapping students. Her presence is always accompanied by the sound of her footsteps. She may also be invisible, except for her heel. In some tales, she often disturbs students at night, demanding her heel, which is said to be missing.

== In popular culture ==
Madam Koi Koi is the antagonist in Simisayo Brownstone's children's book Feyi Fay and The Case of the Mysterious Madam Koi Koi.

The Netflix horror series The Origin: Madam Koi-Koi is loosely based on the urban legend.

A supernatural horror movie, Ms. Kanyin on Amazon Prime Video, is based on the story in which Miss. Kanyin becomes Madame Koi-Koi to take revenge on those students who were the cause of her death.

== See also ==
- Duppy
- Mami Wata
- Tikoloshe
