= The Rise of Igbinogun =

2021 Nigerian action film

- Directed by: Innocent Ideh
- Written by: Innocent Ideh
- Produced by: Tunde Aina and Innocent Chukwuma Ideh
- Starring: Shaffy Bello, Femi Branch, Blossom Chukwujekwu, Ego Nwosu, Akin Lewis, Damilare Kuku, Tina Mba, and Enyinna Nwigwe
- Release date: 2021
- Country: Nigeria
- Language: English

The Rise of Igbinogun is a 2021 Nigerian action film written and directed by Innocent Ideh and co-produced by Tunde Aina and Innocent Chukwuma Ideh. The film stars Shaffy Bello, Femi Branch, Blossom Chukwujekwu, Ego Nwosu, Akin Lewis, Damilare Kuku, Tina Mba, and Enyinna Nwigwe.

== Synopsis ==
The Rise of Igbinogun is a story of a young female warrior who wants to close the dichotomy that exists between the rich and the poor in the society. She steals from the rich in order to take care of the poor. She becomes wanted by the king's guards, the rich, including her father, but she also becomes the messiah of the needy and poor people.

== Cast ==
- Blossom Chukwujekwu
- Shaffy Bello
- Enyinna Nwigwe
- Tina Mba
- Ego Nwosu
- Akin Lewis
- Femi Branch
- Damilare Kuku

== Premiere ==
The film was first premiered privately to the press, notable Nollywood personnel and movie critics at the Sky cinemas Sangotedo, Lagos State on 15 March 2022 in collaboration with StarTimes. Three days later, the film was shown in cinemas across the country.
