= A Green Fever =

- Directed by: Taiwo Egunjobi
- Written by: Isaac Ayodeji
- Produced by: Nemsia Studios, Sable Productions
- Starring: Temilolu Fosudo, Ruby Precious Okezie, William Benson, Darasimi Nadi
- Cinematography: Okwong Fadamana
- Edited by: Kolade Morakinyo
- Music by: Gray Jones Ossai
- Production companies: Nemsia Studios, Sable Productions
- Distributed by: Amazon Prime Video
- Release date: 11 September 2023
- Country: Nigeria
- Language: English

A Green Fever is a 2023 Nigerian neo-noir thriller film directed by Taiwo Egunjobi and written by Isaac Ayodeji. Produced by Nemsia Studios and Sable Productions, the film explores themes of paranoia, betrayal, and survival set against the political backdrop of 1980s Nigeria. It stars Temilolu Fosudo, Ruby Precious Okezie, William Benson, and Darasimi Nadi.

The film premiered at the Africa International Film Festival (AFRIFF) in November 2023 and was released on Amazon Prime Video in February 2024.

== Plot ==
Set in 1980s Nigeria during an era of military coups, A Green Fever follows Kunmi Braithwaite, an architect traveling with his sick daughter, Ireti. After Ireti collapses, Kunmi seeks shelter at a secluded mansion inhabited by Mathilda and her lover, Colonel Bashiru. The film unfolds within the mansion, where secrets, power dynamics, and personal agendas reveal themselves in a tense, suspense-filled setting.

== Cast ==
- Temilolu Fosudo as Kunmi Braithwaite
- Darasimi Nadi as Ireti
- Ruby Precious Okezie as Mathilda
- William Benson as Colonel Bashiru

== Production ==
The film was produced by Nigerian film studio Nemsia Studios in collaboration with Sable Productions. It was shot primarily in Ibadan. Director Taiwo Egunjobi has stated that the film's claustrophobic style and political themes were inspired by both personal storytelling interests and the sociopolitical context of Nigeria in the 1980s.

== Release ==
A Green Fever premiered at AFRIFF 2023 and became available for streaming on Amazon Prime Video in February 2024.

== Reception ==
A Green Fever received generally positive reviews from multiple independent, reliable sources. Critics praised its atmospheric tension, performances, and visual aesthetics. FictionMachine described the film as "brutal and beautiful," emphasising its noir influences and the minimalistic execution. Culture Custodian highlighted the film's promising setup but noted that its ending felt abrupt and less satisfying. Premium Times lauded the film's suspenseful narrative and themes of manipulation and survival. The Nollywood Reporter emphasised the strength of the performances and the historical relevance of the setting.

== See also ==
- Nemsia Studios
- Nigerian cinema
