= Freedom Way =

2024 Nigerian action drama film directed by Afolabi Olalekan

- Directed by: Afolabi Olalekan
- Screenplay by: Blessing Uzzi
- Story by: Blessing Uzzi
- Produced by: Blessing Uzzi
- Starring: Adebowale Adedayo; Bimbo Akintola; Jesse Suntele; Meg Otanwa; Ogranya
- Production company: Bluhouse Studios
- Release dates: 7 September 2024 (TIFF); 18 July 2025 (Nigeria)
- Running time: 88 minutes
- Country: Nigeria
- Languages: English; Yoruba

Freedom Way is a 2024 Nigerian action thriller drama film written and produced by Blessing Uzzi and directed by Afolabi Olalekan in his feature film directorial debut. The film sheds light on some of the pressing issues facing Nigerians, such as rampant corruption, police brutality, political oppression, and economic insecurity and their impact on Nigerian youth. The film premiered at the 2024 Toronto International Film Festival in the Discovery section on 7 September 2024. In November the film went on to win the Special Jury Award at the Africa International Film Festival (AFRIFF).

== Synopsis ==
After years of hard work software developers Themba (Jesse Suntele) and Tayo (Ogranya Jable), launch their highly anticipated venture, Easy Go — a rideshare app that connects Lagos's motorcyclists with customers in the metropolitan area. The elation of the successful launch of their venture turns to despair when confronted with the realities of dealing with unfavorable government laws, rules and regulations, and police brutality.

== Cast ==
- Adebowale Adedayo as Abiola
- Bimbo Akintola
- Jesse Suntele as Themba
- Meg Otanwa as Abiola's wife
- Femi Jacobs as police cop
- Mike Afolarin
- Ogranya as Tayo
- Teniola Aladese
- Taye Arimoro as doctor
- Tiwalola Adebola-Walter
- Akin Lewis as Mr Ademola

== Production ==
The film was bankrolled by Blessing Uzzi under her production banner Bluhouse Studios. The story was mostly shot and set in Lagos. The filmmakers faced a series of challenges due to budgetary constraints, reshoots and even unexpected recasting—one of the actors signed to the project backed out fearful that his aspirations for a future political career would be hampered due to the film's politically sensitive subject matter.

== Theme ==
Uzzi set out to tell a story that was in part inspired by recent Nigerian headlines, but for structure, looked to Crash, the Oscar-winning 2004 drama about race relations in Los Angeles, and to Ava DuVernay’s 2019 series When They See Us, which fictionalized an egregious miscarriage of justice in New York City in the 1980s.

The film showcases the harsh realities of contemporary Nigerian youth, including human rights abuses by the Nigerian police. Director Afolabi Olalekan was himself a victim of harassment by the Nigeria Police Force and is explicit that Freedom Way is an indictment of the institution.

"The Nigerian Police Force is notorious for harassing and extorting young Nigerians for how they are dressed and groomed or for the gadgets in their possession, profiling them as criminals and fraudsters, sometimes even going as far as holding them in jails, until they are able to prove themselves innocent of the crimes they’ve been charged with despite zero evidence linking them to the allegations. I have been a victim of such harassments and arrests and my experience partly inspired the creative direction of ‘Freedom Way.’ So for me, ‘Freedom Way’ is personal and true in every sense of that word."

== Reception ==
Freedom Way received generally positive reviews from critics, both in Nigeria and internationally, for its screenplay, direction, cinematography, and acting. Variety compared the film's structure to the works of Iranian filmmaker Asghar Farhadiin in which a specific incident often serves as catalyst for the unfolding proceedings.

Following its TIFF debut in September 2024, Freedom Way was showcased at the Africa International Film Festival (AFRIFF) in Nigeria, where it won the Jury Award in November. The film was later featured at the Red Sea International Film Festival in Saudi Arabia in December.
