= Headless (2015 film) =

- Theatrical release poster
- Directed by: Arthur Cullipher
- Written by: Nathan Erdel
- Produced by: Scott Schirmer; Kara Erdel
- Starring: Shane Beasley; Kelsey Carlisle; Ellie Church
- Cinematography: Leya Taylor
- Edited by: Arthur Cullipher; Scott Schirmer
- Music by: Magician Johnson; James Nash; Arthur Cullipher
- Production companies: Forbidden Films; Gentleman Monster Productions
- Distributed by: Slaughter MovieHouse
- Release date: February 14, 2015 (Festival premiere)
- Running time: 86 minutes
- Country: United States
- Language: English

Headless is a 2015 American independent slasher film directed by Arthur Cullipher. It is based on the film within a film from the 2012 horror film Found. The film was funded by donors from Kickstarter, and the first festival screening was in February 2015 in Indianapolis.

== Plot summary ==
In this "lost slasher film from 1978," a masked killer wages an unrelenting spree of murder, cannibalism, and necrophilia. But when his tortured past comes back to haunt him, he plunges to even greater depths of madness and depravity, consuming the lives of a young woman and those she holds dear.

== Cast ==
- Shane Beasley as The Killer

Kaden Miller as Skull Boy / The Killer (Child)
Matt Keeley as The Killer (Teenager)

- Kelsey Carlisle as Jess Hardy
- Ellie Church as Betsy Coard
- Jeff DaCosta of UMass Dartmouth and New Bedford, Mass as Pete Christy
- Jennifer Lee as The Hitchhiker

== Reception ==
HorrorNews.net awarded the film score of 4.5 out of 5, with the reviewer calling it "the most intensely disturbing film I’ve seen since Found". PopHorror.com wrote, "While Headless might prove a bit too much for some viewers, those in the market for more extreme and depraved fare will do themselves a disservice if they pass [it] up." Richard Taylor from Severed Cinema awarded the film 4/5 stars, calling it "one of the top horror movies of the year" while noting that it "gasses out a bit by the time the final act rolls out".
