= Nemsia Studios =

Nigerian film production company

- Type: Private
- Industry: Entertainment
- Founded: 2013
- Founder: Derin Adeyokunnu and BB Sasore
- Headquarters: Lagos, Lagos State, Nigeria
- Products: Films
- Website: www.nemsiastudios.com

Nemsia Studios is a Nigerian film production company. Its production studios are based in Ilupeju, Lagos. The company was founded in 2013 by Derin Adeyokunnu and BB Sasore. In addition to its films, Nemsia Studios also produces TV series.

Notable productions from Nemsia studios include Before 30 (2015), God Calling (2018) and Banana Island Ghost (2017) which ranks in the Top 50 of list of highest-grossing Nigerian films of all time.

Nemsia Films also produced Breath of Life (2023), which went on to win the Best Movie category at AMVCA Award 2024

On 7 March 2025, Nemsia Studios released an action-drama movie Suky, which debuted at number 5 on Prime Videos

== Productions ==
| Year | Title | Ref |
|---|---|---|
| 2015 | Before 30 | |
| 2017 | Banana Island Ghost | |
| 2018 | God Calling | |
| 2023 | Breath of Life | |
| 2024 | A Green Fever | |
| 2024 | With Difficulty Comes Ease | |
| 2024 | Soft Love | |
| 2025 | Suky | |
| 2025 | After 30 | |
| 2025 | Ms. Kanyin | |
| 2025 | The Fire and the Moth | |
| 2025 | Finding Nina | |
