= The Herbert Macaulay Affair =

- Directed by: Imoh Umoren
- Written by: Bisi Jamgbadi
- Based on: Life of Herbert Macaulay
- Starring: William Benson; Saidi Balogun; Kelechi Udegbe; Martha Ehinome Orhiere; Tubosun Ayedun
- Edited by: Olutayo Odugbesan
- Production company: Rucksack Productionz
- Distributed by: TRACE Content Distribution
- Release date: 25 October 2019 (Nigeria)
- Running time: 90 minutes
- Country: Nigeria
- Language: English

The Herbert Macaulay Affair is a 2019 Nigerian film based on the life of Herbert Macaulay, a Nigerian nationalist and proponent of Nigerian independence. It was directed by Imoh Umoren and featured William Benson in the lead role alongside Saidi Balogun, Kelechi Udegbe and Martha Ehinome Orhiere. The film also features Herbert Macaulay's grandson, Wale Macaulay. Other historical figures portrayed in the film include Alimotu Pelewura, leader of the Lagos Market Women's Association, Oba Eshugbayi Eleko, the Eleko of Eko at the time, Amodu Tijani Oluwa, the Chief Oluwa of Lagos and Henry Rawlingson Carr, educator and administrator.

== Plot ==
The Herbert Macaulay Affair is set in 1920s Lagos during the Bubonic plague. It portrays Herbert Macaulay trying to call Nigerians to action in order to confront their oppressors. He leads protests and writes anti-colonial articles in newspapers. The film starts by depicting Macaulay's 1893 return from studying in Plymouth. He takes up a surveying job in service of the colonial administration. The workings of the colonial administration frustrate Macaulay, leading him to a life of rebellion.

== Cast ==
- William Benson as Herbert Macaulay
- Saidi Balogun as Eleko
- Kelechi Udegbe
- Martha Ehinome Orhiere
- Tubosun Ayedun
- Sunday Afolabi
- Mary Kowo as Alimotu Pelewura
- Ogagbe Oghenechovwe Blessing
- Phillip Jarman
- Stanley Matthews
- Obiora Maduegbuna
- Lolo Eremie
- Wale Macaulay

== Crew ==
- Director - Imoh Umoren
- Writer - Bisi Jamgbadi
- Editor - Olutayo Odugbesan
- Cinematography - Yemi Adeojo
- Gaffer - Sunday Olalekan
- Make-Up - Nneka Emekalam
- Costume - Seun Banjo
- Technical Coordinator - Dewumi Adedamola

== Themes ==
The Herbert Macaulay Affair explores the themes of love, loss and tragedy depicted in Macaulay's activism.

== Production and release ==
The film explores about 3 decades of Herbert Macaulay's life where he continually rebels against the colonial government. Imo Umoren was inspired to make The Herbert Macaulay Affair while working on a documentary chronicling the 100 year history of Nigerian national figures.

Some scenes in the film were shot in Jaekel House and Mapo Hall.

== Reception ==
A writer for Pulse Nigeria noted that films like The Herbert Macaulay Affair can help bridge a gap in teaching history to Nigerians as there was a preexisting misconception that Herbert Macaulay was a white man. A reviewer for YNaija however commented that the film was one of the most memorable flops of the year 2019 due to "tepid technical details matched with a half-baked screenplay and wooden actors."
