= Finding Nina =

- Directed by: Famous Odion Iraoya
- Written by: Famous Odion Iraoya
- Produced by: Dalaham Hirse; Joshua Enakarhire (co-producer)
- Starring: Abdulazeem M. Ibrahim; Ijapari Ben-Hook (Ben-Hirki); Tomi Ojo; Paul Sambo
- Production company: Nemsia Studios
- Distributed by: Amazon Prime Video
- Release date: 8 August 2025 (streaming)
- Running time: ~95 minutes
- Country: Nigeria
- Languages: English, Hausa

Finding Nina is a 2025 Nigerian drama film directed and written by Famous Odion Iraoya and produced by Dalaham Hirse and Joshua Enakarhire under Nemsia Studios in collaboration with Unfriendly Space Studios. The film premiered on Amazon Prime Video on 8 August 2025.

== Plot ==
Renowned photographer JB returns to Northern Nigeria in an effort to reshape prevailing narratives of conflict and poverty. In the vibrant landscapes of his childhood, he meets Nina, his mystery muse whose likeness triggers a journey through memory, love, and healing. As JB navigates dreamlike sequences infused with Hausa folklore, he confronts past traumas and unspoken emotions. Parallel to this quest, Riayah, JB's creative partner in Lagos, quietly harbours love for him. The story unfolds as a poetic tapestry of identity, belonging, and cultural rediscovery.

== Cast ==
- Ibrahim Jammal as JB (Jabir), the photographer
- Ijapari Ben-Hirki as Nina
- Tomi Ojo as Riayah
- Paul Sambo as Abdul

== Production ==
The film is a collaborative production between Nemsia Studios, a prominent Nigerian film company known for international projects, and Unfriendly Space Studios

=== Release and reception ===
The film premiered exclusively on Amazon Prime Video on 8 August 2025. It received responses for its cinematography and storytelling, grounded in culture. Reviewers highlighted its lyrical exploration of Northern Nigerian identity. The film ranked number 3 on Amazon Prime Video's Top 10 Movies chart in Nigeria in August 2025.
