= With Difficulty Comes Ease =

- Directed by: Korede Azeez
- Written by: Korede Azeez
- Produced by: Sheriff Akinola Bakare
- Starring: Uzoamaka Aniunoh; Caleb Richards; Ummi Baba-Ahmed
- Cinematography: Olamilekan Olaoye Sheriff Bakare
- Edited by: Steven Iordye Korede Azeez
- Production company: Nemsia Studios
- Distributed by: Amazon Prime Video
- Release date: 1 August 2024
- Country: Nigeria
- Languages: English, Hausa

With Difficulty Comes Ease is a 2024 Nigerian drama film written and directed by Korede Azeez and produced by Sheriff Akinola Bakare in collaboration with Nemsia Studios. The film premiered via Amazon Prime Video, the film received critical acclaim, winning awards at The Annual Film Mischief 2024.

== Plot ==
Set in the conservative and deeply cultural backdrop of Northern Nigeria, the film tells the story of Zainab, a 30-year-old woman who becomes a widow shortly after finally conceiving her first child, following six years of infertility. During the Islamic mourning period known as Iddah, Zainab is confronted with financial hardship, community judgment, and pressure from her strict mother-in-law. Amid her struggles, she meets Rayyan, a warm and empathetic bank officer who helps her rediscover her passion for fashion and her strength. As their friendship deepens, Zainab begins to reimagine a future for herself, filled with purpose and hope.

== Cast ==
- Uzoamaka Aniunoh as Zainab
- Caleb Richards as Rayyan
- Ummi Baba-Ahmed as Hajiya
- Michelle Dede as Nene
- Magaji Mijinyawa as Alhaji Danjuma
- Gloria Johnson as Maman Hadiza

== Reception ==
The film was noted for its sensitive depiction of grief, faith, cultural expectations, and emotional depth. It also depicts Northern Nigerian culture and the exploration of womanhood within a patriarchal society.

== Awards & Recognition ==
The film won Best Feature Film, Best Screenplay, and the Jury Cheese Prize at The Annual Film Mischief 2024.
