= Blessing Uzzi =

Nigerian film director

- Uzoma
- Born: Uzoma Blessing Chibuike
- Citizenship: Nigerian
- Education: Eastern Mediterranean University, North Cyprus
- Occupations: Producer and Director
- Organization: Bluhouse Studios
- Notable work: Call of My Life

Blessing Uzzi (born, Uzoma Blessing Chibuike) is Nigerian Film director, Editor and Producer who obtained a degree in International Relations. She won Best Overall Movie and Writing in AMVCA 2025 Awards. She founded the BluHouse Studios and produced the film Freedom Way, a film that won her Best Movie Award in 2025 AMVCA Awards. Her work on Freedom Way showcase Police Brutality.

== Career ==
In 2025, Kachifo: Till the Morning Comes, a film she produced alongside Dika Ofoma, won three international awards at the Locarno Film Festival. In 2026, the film won Norway’s Sørfond Grant of USD 64,000.

In 2026, she produced Call of My Life through Bluehouse Studio. The film became the highest-grossing non-December release in Nigerian box office history.

== Works ==
- Freedom Way
- Agwaetiti Obiuto
- Sister Rose
- No Mans Land
- My Body God's Temple
- Something Sweet
- A Quite Monday
- I Hate It Here
- Call of My Life
