= William Benson (actor) =

Nigerian actor, playwright, and producer

- Born: William Benson; March 25, 1970 (age 56); Lagos
- Citizenship: Nigeria
- Education: University of Lagos
- Occupation: Filmmaking
- Known for: Acting
- Notable work: To Kill a Monkey; Ajoche; The Herbert Macaulay Affair; The Fire and the Moth; Dead Tide

William Benson (born March 25, 1970) is a Nigerian actor, theatre director, playwright and producer. He is best known for his role as Efe on Kemi Adetiba’s Netflix tv show To Kill a Monkey. One of his films, Ajoche, was premiered on Africa Magic Showcase (DStv 151).

== Early life and education ==
He had his secondary school education at Apapa Senior High School and obtained West African Senior School Certificate Examination (WASSCE). He is a graduate of English Language and Literature from the University of Lagos.

== Filmography ==
William is regarded as a celebrated notable actor. He was also described as “frequently cast in intense, emotionally charged roles, leaders, anti-heroes, and historical figures, making him a go-to performer for prestige dramas and epics.” He featured in:

- The Fire and the Moth (2025) as Teriba Bello
- Osamede (2025)
- Dead Tide (2025)
- To Kill a Monkey (2025) as Efe
- All's Fair in Love (2024)
- House of Ga'a (2024) as Gbagi
- A Green Fever (2023) as Colonel Bashiru
- Obara’M (2022)
- Crime and Justice Lagos (2022) as Femi Biboye
- Flawsome (2022) as Inspector Kazeem
- Love Is War (2019) as Tunde Aina
- The Herbert Macaulay Affair (2019)
