= Osamede =

2025 Nigerian fictional drama film

- Directed by: James Omokwe
- Written by: Lolo Eremie
- Based on: Osamede: For Kingdom and Country (musical play); Paul Ugbede; Tosin Otudeko
- Produced by: Lilian Olubi
- Starring: Okujaye Egboh; Lexan Aisosa Peters; William Benson; Tosin Adeyemi; Lancelot Oduwa Imasuen; Alexander Bud
- Cinematography: Charles Oleghe
- Edited by: Winston Aig-Ohioma
- Music by: Chubb Okobah
- Production company: Gold Lilies Global Services
- Release date: 17 May 2025 (Cannes)
- Running time: 115 minutes
- Country: Nigeria
- Language: Edo
- Budget: ₦300 Million

Osamede is a 2025 Nigerian epic historical drama film, produced by Lilian Olubi and directed by James Omokwe, who is known for the television series Ajoche and Riona. It stars Ivie Okujaye Egboh, Lexan Aisosa Peters, William Benson, Tosin Adeyemi, Lancelot Oduwa Imasuen, and Alexander Bud. The film is set during the 1897 invasion of the Benin Kingdom by the British Empire and was adapted from the musical play Osamede: for Kingdom and Country.

== Synopsis ==
A young orphan girl, Osamede, learns she has superpowers as the chosen protector of the Aruosa stone, an object revered, as it is said to be blessed by Osanobua, the Benin deity of creation. The Aruosa stone makes her the only one who can resist the British invaders and invoke the power hidden deep within her people's past.

== Selected cast ==
- Ivie Okujaye Egboh as Osamede
- Lexan Aisosa Peters
- William Benson
- Tosin Adeyemi
- Lancelot Oduwa Imasuen
- Alexander Bud

== Production ==
Osamde was first conceived as a stage production by producer Lilian Olubi and directed by Ayo Ajayi, with performances held during the 2021-2022 season at the Muson Centre in Lagos. Recognizing the story's cinematic appeal, Olubi later brought on board director James Omokwe and writer Lolo Eremie onto the project for its screen adaption. The film is primarily in the indigenous Edo language—only 10% of the dialogue is in English, according to Egboh. Principal photography took place over 14 days in Edo State, in the villages of Fugar and Ososo, with all sets built entirely from scratch in close consultation with Benin historians. The cost of production was approximately ₦300 Million.

== Release date ==
Osamede premiered on 17 May 2025 at the Cannes Film Market, Pavillon Afriques joining Akinola Davies Jr.'s My Father's Shadow, the first Nigerian film to be included in the official selection at Cannes. Its Nigerian premiere took place on October 17. It was released in cinemas the USA and the United Kingdom on 28th November 2025.

== Awards and nominations ==
| Year | Award | Category | Recipient | Result | Ref |
|---|---|---|---|---|---|
| 2026 | 2026 Africa Magic Viewers' Choice Awards | Best Director | James Omokwe | Nominated | |
| 2026 | 2026 Africa Magic Viewers' Choice Awards | Best Music Score | Chubb Okobah | Nominated | |
| 2026 | 2026 Africa Magic Viewers' Choice Awards | Best Editing | Winston Aig-Ohioma | Nominated | |
| 2025 | Silicon Valley African Film Festival | Best Narrative Feature | James Omokwe | Won | |

== Accolades ==
In October 2025 it took home Best Narrative Feature Film at the Silicon Valley African Film Festival. After the win at the Silicon Valley, the film has been selected for films from the South Festival in Oslo, Norway, which ran from November 6-16, 2025.
