= Ardova Plc =

Nigerian oil company

- Company type: Private
- Industry: Oil and Gas
- Founded: 1964 (British Petroleum Nigeria Limited)
- Headquarters: Victoria Island, Lagos, Nigeria
- Area served: West Africa
- Key people: Abdulwasiu Sowami (Chairman); Abiola Babatunde-Ojo (Managing Director); Oladeinde Nelson Cole (Legal Adviser)
- Products: Petroleum products Fuel Oils; Jet A-1 fuel Lubricants; Gas cylinder
- Revenue: ▲ ₦96.8 billion (Third Quarter 2017)
- Operating income: ▲ ₦9.7 billion (Third Quarter 2017)
- Number of employees: 405
- Website: ardovaplc.com

Ardova Plc (formerly Forte Oil PLC) is an indigenous energy group, headquartered in Lagos, Nigeria, with extended operations in Ghana. It operates majorly in the downstream sector of the Nigeria’s Oil and Gas industry, but has diversified its businesses into other sectors of the energy value chain. The downstream division specializes in the distribution of a wide range of petroleum products; Premium Motor Spirit (PMS), diesel, aviation fuel, kerosene, as well as a range of lubricants for various automobiles and machines; distributed mostly to the automobile, industrial, aviation and marine markets.

== Acquisition ==
Energy mogul Femi Otedola was awarded $19 million in an arbitration case regarding the share purchase agreement (SPA) relating to the acquisition of Forte Oil, now Ardova Plc.

The agreement was reached in response to a decision made by the London Court of International Arbitration (LCIA) in October, which mandated that Ignite Investments and Commodities Limited, Chairman Abdulwasiu Sowami of Ardova's special purpose acquisition company, make SPA payments less the sum granted for one of Zenon Petroleum's claims.

Later, the business would argue that Zenon Petroleum had infringed on its warranty with regard to the SPA, which prompted Ignite Investments to file a lawsuit in which it asserted claims against Zenon.

In order to acquire their 25.9% holding (970.7 million shares) and take Ardova private, Mr. Sowami offered minority shareholders N17.38 per share, or N16.9 billion, in February. It was officially delisted from the Nigerian Exchange on July 26, 2023, following a voluntary buyout by its majority shareholder, Ignite Investments & Commodities Limited, which acquired all remaining minority shares.

== History ==
In 2015 they signed an $83 million contract with Siemens to upgrade the 414 MW plant, the work is due to be completed in 2016

== Board of directors ==
As of 1 September 2023, Forte Oil's directors include:

- Abdulwasiu O. Sowami – Group Executive Chairman
- Dr. Abiola Babatunde-Ojo – Managing Director
- Olusola Adeeyo – Non-Executive Director
- Aniola Durosinmi-Etti – Non-Executive Director
- Aminu Umar – Non-Executive Director
- Alhahi Umaru Sani - Non-Executive Director
