= Call of My Life =

- Directed by: Dammy Twitch
- Written by: Uzoamaka Power
- Produced by: Blessing Uzzi
- Starring: Uzoamaka Power; Andrew Yaw Bunting; Zubby Michael; Beverly Osu; Broda Shaggi; Patience Ozokwor; Nkem Owoh
- Cinematography: Muhammed Atta Ahmed
- Edited by: Afolabi Olalekan; Dammy Twitch
- Music by: Cobhams Asuquo
- Production company: Bluhouse Studios
- Distributed by: FilmOne Entertainment
- Release date: 15 May 2026
- Running time: 87 minutes
- Country: Nigeria
- Language: English

Call of My Life is a 2026 romantic comedy film produced by Blessing Uzzi under Bluehouse Studio and directed by Dammy Twitch. The film was released in cinemas on 15 May 2026 and distributed by FilmOne Entertainment. It stars Uzoamaka Power, Andrew Yaw Bunting, Beverly Osu, Nkem Owoh, and Patience Ozokwor.

== Premise ==
The film follows Soluchi, a hopelessly romantic young woman recovering from a breakup with her former boyfriend, Kalu. Soluchi works as a call centre agent. During a routine service call, she encounters a charming young man named Eli, who rekindles her belief in the possibility of love. This newfound connection leads to a journey of love and healing. In the film, Eli is introduced as Ghanaian.

== Cast ==
- Uzoamaka Power as Soluchi
- Andrew Yaw Bunting as Eli
- Zubby Michael as Kalu
- Beverly Osu as Zimuzo
- Broda Shaggi as Mr. McFoy
- Nkem Owoh as Papa Soluchi
- Patience Ozokwo as Mama Soluchi
- Justin UG

== Reception ==
Nolly Critic described Call of My Life as a romantic comedy for those seeking an emotionally honest film that offers rare credibility. The Guardian described it as a deftly written tale, with Leslie Felperin writing, "Although this package is as corny as the above summary suggests, there’s a breeziness that eases it along throughout."

Writing for What Kept Me Up, Ini-Abasi Jeffrey described Call of My Life as a culturally aware addition to Nollywood's underdeveloped romantic comedy genre. He praised its portrayal of Igbo identity as authentic and familiar, describing it as a classic love story. Pulse Nigeria, on the other hand, described it as a romance film that earned all its clichés.

Since its release, Call of My Life has grossed more than ₦800 million at the box office, making it one of the highest-grossing Nigerian film of 2026.
