= Taiwo Egunjobi =

Nigerian film director

- Occupation: Film Director
- Known for: Film Directing
- Notable work: The Fire and The Moth

Taiwo Egunjobi is a film director and screenwriter who grew up in Ibadan, Nigeria. His directorial work The Fire and The Moth, is a drama portraying against societal situations of southwestern Nigeria. He frequently collaborates with Isaac Ayodeji and Emiola Fagbenle in his works. His works center on satirical settings of Nigerian society.

== Works ==
Egunjobi's directorial works includes,

- The Fire and the Moth (2025)
- A Green Fever (2023)
- Crushed Roses (2022)
- All Na Vibes (2021)
- In Ibadan (2021)
- Dwindle (2021)
- The Grudge (2016)
- Gidi Blues (2016)
