= Journey of an African Colony =

Nigerian film documentary series

- Based on: A Platter of Gold: Making Nigeria Possessed: A History of Law & Justice in the Crown Colony of Lagos 1861–1906 The King and the Colony for Journey of an African Colony
- Directed by: BB Sasore
- Narrated by: Olasupo Shasore
- Country of origin: Nigeria

Production
- Production company: Quramo Production

Original release
- Network: Netflix
- Release: 2019

Journey of an African Colony, The Making of Nigeria is a seven-episode Nigerian documentary series. It was released on Netflix on the 60th anniversary of Nigeria's independence. The series is based on two books — Possessed: A History of Law & Justice in the Crown Colony of Lagos 1861–1906 and A Platter of Gold: Making Nigeria — by retired attorney general and commissioner for justice in Lagos State, Olasupo Shasore. It is narrated and produced by Shasore. The series overviews the history of colonization, the slave trade, and independence in Nigeria.

Shasore travelled Nigeria for the series which has an emphasis on the slave era, pre-colonialism, and independence. While there are archives that contain a comprehensive history of the country, there are hardly any media with detailed narrative like Journey of an African Colony. It underlines the discrepancy between purported and actual goals of colonial powers, mainly Great Britain.

Journey of an African Colony: The Making of Nigeria is a seven-episode docuseries, each half an hour long. Journey of an African Colony did a brief run on television in 2019 because Shasore wanted to make sure it was seen in Nigeria before it aired internationally.

The series was directed by BB Sasore, with sound design by Kulanen Ikyo and cinematography by Ola Cardoso. Historical maps for the documentary were provided by Ademide Adelusi-Adeluyi.
