= The Weekend (2024 film) =

2024 Nigerian film

- Directed by: Daniel Oriahi
- Written by: Egbemawei Sammy; Vanessa Kanu; Frederick Anyaegbunam
- Produced by: Uche Okocha
- Starring: Uzoamaka Aniunoh; Bucci Franklin; Gloria Anozie; Keppy Ekpenyong-Bassey; James Gardiner; Meg Otanwa
- Cinematography: Idhebor Kagho
- Edited by: U. Ehizoba Chris
- Music by: Michael Truth Ogunlade
- Release date: 30 August 2024
- Country: Nigeria

The Weekend is a 2024 Nigerian film written by Egbemawei Sammy, Vanessa Kanu, and Frederick O. Anyaegbunam, produced by Uche Okocha, and directed by Daniel Oriahi. The cast includes Uzoamaka Aniunoh, Bucci Franklin, Ekpenyong Bassey Inyang, Meg Otanwa, Gloria Anozie–Young, Damilola Ogunsi, James Gardiner and Bryan Okoye. Following its premiere at the Tribeca Festival in June 2024, the film was released to Nigerian cinemas on August 30th, 2024. The film is the first and only (so far) Nigerian film to have a premiere at the Tribeca Festival.

== Synopsis ==
The Weekend tells the story of Nikiya (played by Uzoamaka Aniunoh) who is an orphan and feels lonely as she constantly yearns for a family. She soon begins to find a family in her fiancé, Luke (played by Bucci Franklin), and as her strong desire for a family grows, she expresses her desire to meet Luke's family.

Luke on the other hand keeps avoiding taking Nikiya to meet his family, but she won't listen and is really keen on meeting his family. In a bid to satisfy Nikiya and owing to the love Luke has for her, he gives in and soon enough, she uncovers the truth that drove Luke away from his family, leading to more problems.

== Selected cast ==
- Uzoamaka Aniunoh as Nikiya
- Bucci Franklin as Luke
- Gloria Anozie as Omicha
- Keppy Ekpenyong-Bassey as Meki
- James Gardiner as Zeido
- Damilola Ogunsi
- Meg Otanwa as Kama
- Bryaan Okoye

== Release and recognition ==
Following its release to Nigerian cinema, The Weekend made over ₦8 million, this was believed to also be a result of its selection at the 2024 Tribeca Film Festival in New York.

The Weekend topped the 2024 Africa Movie Academy Awards, getting 16 nominations, including Best Achievement in Make-Up, Best Achievement in Costume Design, and Best Achievement in Visual Effects. The 16 nominations set a new record for Nollywood.

Subsequently, The Weekend dominated the 2024 Africa Movie Academy Awards (AMAA), winning Best Screenplay and Best Film, among other awards.
