= Headless (2024 film) =

2024 Nigerian film

- Directed by: Michael Ndiomu
- Written by: Michael Ndiomu; Samuel Ifeanyi Nnam
- Produced by: Michael Ndiomu
- Starring: Segun Arinze; Gideon Okeke; Uzoamaka Power
- Distributed by: FilmOne Distributions
- Release date: 2024
- Country: Nigeria
- Language: English

Headless is a 2024 Nigerian film. It premiered at AFRIFF in 2024 and was released to cinemas in March 2026. The film is distributed by FilmOne Distributions.

== Cast ==
- Gideon Okeke
- Uzoamaka Power
- Segun Arinze
- Baaj Adebule
- Gbubemi Ejeye
- Ruby Okezie
- Femi Branch

== Background ==
Headless was directed and produced by Michael Ndiomu. It debuted at the November 2024 Africa International Film Festival (AFRIFF) in Lagos, Nigeria.

== Reception ==
Whatkeptmeup criticised the film's camera and shooting, but praised the screenplay.
