= Temi Otedola =

Nigerian actress and blogger (born 1996)

Temi Ajibade
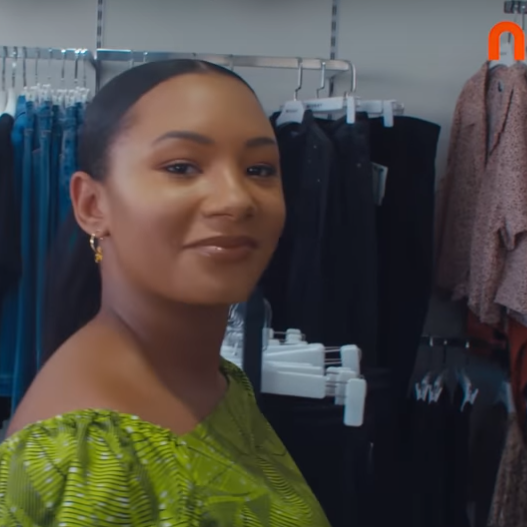
- Temi Ajibade
- Born: Temiloluwa Elizabeth Otedola; 20 March 1996 (age 30)
- Education: University of London
- Occupations: Actress; blogger
- Spouse: Mr Eazi (m. 2025)
- Parents: Femi Otedola (father); Nana Otedola (mother)

Temiloluwa "Temi" Elizabeth Ajibade (née Otedola; born 20 March 1996) is a Nigerian actress and blogger. She is known for playing the role of Moremi Oluwa in the 2020 film Citation, and later appeared in The Man for the Job (2022) and Ms. Kanyin (2025). She co-hosts the podcast How Far? With Mr Eazi and Temi Otedola.

== Early life and education ==
Temiloluwa was born 20 March 1996. She studied art history at both the University College London and University of London.

== Career ==
Temiloluwa started a fashion blog called JTO Fashion in December 2014. She documents fashion, beauty, art, and her travel experiences. She made her Nollywood debut in Kunle Afolayan's 2020 film Citation. She won Best Actress in a Leading Role at the 2021 Ghana Movie Awards for Citation, ⁣ and was nominated for Revelation of the Year at the 2020 Best of Nollywood Awards. She also starred in The Man for the Job, a feature film written and directed by Niyi Akinmolayan. On stage, she made her theatre debut in Motherland the Musical at Terra Kulture, Lagos. She played “Amara” in the 2025 Prime Video feature Ms. Kanyin.

In 2024, L’Oréal Paris appointed Ajibade its first-ever African (Sub-Saharan) Digital Brand Ambassador, with appearances during Paris Fashion Week.

== Personal life ==
Temi is DJ Cuppy and Tolani's younger sister and the last girl child of Nigerian businessman Femi Otedola. She is in a relationship with Nigerian singer Mr Eazi who was born in Rivers State, with whom she has a podcast named How Far with Mr. Eazi and Temi. On 10 April 2022, she got engaged to Mr. Eazi. On August 9, 2025, Temi married Mr. Eazi in a private ceremony in Iceland designed by The Lynden Lane Co. The couple celebrated their marriage in 2025 with a civil ceremony in Monaco on 9 May, a traditional Yoruba wedding in Dubai in July, and a church wedding in Reykjavík, Iceland, where the bride wore Fendi Haute Couture; coverage and photographs were published by Vogue.

After the wedding, she updated her public surname to Ajibade on social media. This action caused an uproar and extensive debates around the issues of choice and feminism in the modern world.

In May 2026, Otedola and her husband, Mr Eazi, announced they were expecting their first child, revealing they had discovered the pregnancy while on their honeymoon in Asia. Otedola subsequently documented aspects of her pregnancy on social media, describing the experience as "the most hardest, rewarding and beautiful" phase of her life, discussing stretch marks and morning sickness, and referring to her growing bump as her "glistening puff puff belly." On the couple's joint podcast, How Far?, Mr Eazi said the couple had consulted nine doctors across different countries because they were undecided on where the baby would be born, and that he had considered Japan as a possible birth location and looked into Japanese names for the child; Otedola said she rejected the idea.

== Filmography ==
- Citation (2020) as Moremi
- The Man for the Job (2022) as Zina
- Ms. Kanyin (2025) as Amara

== Awards and nominations ==
Year	Award	Category	Film	Result	Ref
2020	Best of Nollywood Awards	Revelation of the Year	—N/a	Nominated	
2021	Ghana Movie Awards	Best Actress	Citation	Won	
2021	Net Honours	Most Searched Person	—N/a	Nominated	
