= Femi Otedola =

Nigerian businessman (born 1962)

Femi Otedola CON
- Born: Olufemi Peter Otedola; 4 November 1962 (age 63); Ibadan, Oyo State, Nigeria
- Education: Methodist Boys' High School, Lagos; Olivet Baptist High School
- Occupation: Businessman
- Spouse: Nana Otedola
- Children: 4, including DJ Cuppy and Temi Otedola
- Parent: Michael Otedola

Femi Peter Otedola CON (born 4 November 1962) is a Nigerian businessman and philanthropist. He is the former chairman of Forte Oil PLC, and former executive chairman of Geregu Power PLC.

Otedola made his first fortune in commodities before selling his shares in Forte Oil to invest in the energy business. Otedola was chairman of Geregu Power, a power generation business, and owned more than 70% of the shares. In 2022 and 2023, he sold down Geregu stake that was once more than 95% to bring on institutional investors. Investors in Geregu include the Nigerian government, the Afrexim Fund for Export Development in Africa and the State Grid Corporation of China.

He owns properties in Lagos, Dubai, London and Monaco, and holds shares in Zenith Bank and FBN Holdings. Otedola founded Zenon Petroleum and Gas Ltd and owns several other ventures spanning shipping, real estate, and finance.

== Early life ==
Otedola was born in Ibadan, the capital of Oyo State, southwest Nigeria, into the family of the late Sir Michael Otedola, Governor of Lagos State from 1992 to 1993. He is ethnic Yoruba.

=== Personal life ===
Femi Otedola's first daughter, Tolani, is a singer. She was born to Otedola and his former wife, Olayinka Odukoya. Later, Femi married Nana Otedola and had two more daughters—Florence Ifeoluwa and Elizabeth Temi—and a son, Fewa. Florence Otedola, aka DJ Cuppy, is a DJ and music producer, as well as a tourism ambassador for Nigeria. Her younger sister, Temi, is an actress, a style blogger and aspiring designer.

Otedola has homes in Lagos, Abuja, Dubai, London and New York City. As of 2026, Forbes estimates his net worth at US$1.4 billion.

His autobiography has emerged as a bestseller on Amazon.

In 2025, he bought a 10-bedroom house in the city’s St John’s Wood district in London for £53 million ($72 million). The property was built in 2016, and has a cinema, a spa and a "cigar room".

== Fuel marketing ==
=== Zenon Petroleum and Gas ===
In 2003, having identified an opportunity in the fuel retail market, Otedola secured the finance to set up Zenon Petroleum and Gas Ltd, a petroleum products marketing and distribution company.

As owner and chairman of Zenon, in 2004, he invested N15 billion in downstream infrastructure development and acquired storage depots at Ibafon, Apapa as well as four cargo vessels, amounting to a combined total storage capacity of 147,000 metric tons. The same year he acquired a fleet of 100 DAF fuel-tanker trucks for N1.4 billion.

By 2005, Zenon controlled a major share of the Nigerian diesel market, supplying fuel to most of the major manufacturers in the country including Dangote Group, Cadbury, Coca-Cola, Nigerian Breweries, MTN, Unilever, Nestle and Guinness.

In March 2007, it was announced that ten banks had approved a syndicated loan of US$1.5 billion (N193.5 billion) to Zenon as working capital to build the largest premium motor spirit storage facility in Africa. Later that year Zenon acquired a 28.7 per cent stake in African Petroleum, one of Nigeria's largest fuel marketers. Zenon also invested across the financial sector, becoming the largest shareholder in a number of Nigerian banks including Zenith Bank and United Bank for Africa (UBA). As well as diesel, Zenon also became an important player in the kerosene market.

In 2012, Zenon was among a number of companies named in a report into an alleged fuel subsidy scam. According to the report Zenon owed the government $1.4 million. It was further reported that Farouk Lawan, the Nigerian legislator who compiled the report, had apparently been filmed collecting $500,000 of a supposed total sum of $3 million from Otedola to remove Zenon from the list. It subsequently emerged that Otedola had previously reported Lawan's harassment and demands for bribes to the State Security Services, who had orchestrated a sting operation. Lawan was charged with corruption in February 2013.

=== African Petroleum ===
In 2007, Otedola was appointed chairman and chief executive of Africa Petroleum through the acquisition of a controlling stake in the business. In December that year he personally acquired a further 29.3 per cent of the company for N40 billion. A merger of this personal holding with Zenon's brought Otedola's total stake to 55.3 per cent.

Following Otedola's entry into the company African Petroleum's share price rose sharply, increasing the market capitalisation from N36 billion to N217 billion in six months. In 2008, in response to public concerns over the availability and pricing of kerosene, African Petroleum launched an initiative to saturate the market and sell fuel at N50 per litre from more than 500 service stations across Nigeria.

In March 2009, Otedola became the second Nigerian after Aliko Dangote to appear on the Forbes list of dollar-denominated billionaires, with an estimated net worth of $1.2 billion. In October 2009, Otedola announced a move to upgrade African Petroleum's liquefied petroleum gas (LPG) storage terminals in Lagos, Kano and Port Harcourt. Difficult economic conditions caused by the slump in world oil prices and credit squeeze of 2008–09 led African Petroleum to record a loss in 2009.

=== Forte Oil ===
In December 2010, African Petroleum rebranded, changing its name to Forte Oil PLC. Otedola carried out a restructuring of the business, focusing on technology and improved corporate governance. Forte Oil returned to profit in 2012.

In 2013, as part of the Federal Government's push to liberalise Nigeria's ailing power sector, Otedola financed 57% of Forte Oil subsidiary Amperion Ltd, which acquired the 414 MW Geregu Power Plant for $132 million.

Forte's improved financial position and diversification into power generation resulted in a 1,321 per cent rise in its share price during 2013. The first half of 2014 saw the company's pre-tax profit more than double year-on-year to 4.19 billion naira ($25.7 million). Revenue growth for the whole year was 33 per cent. In November 2014, Otedola returned to the Forbes rich list having dropped off it following the fall in share price during 2009.

In September 2015 Forte Oil sold 17 per cent of its equity to Swiss commodity trader Mercuria Energy Group, giving Forte access to global commodity markets. The deal was thought to have given Otedola an estimated $200 million.

In 2019, Otedola sold Forte Oil Plc and announced plans to change focus from oil to power with his company, Geregu Power Plc.

== Other investments and positions ==
In 1994, Otedola established CentreForce Ltd, specialising in finance, investments and trading. Otedola is also the owner of Swift Insurance.

Otedola is chief executive and president of SeaForce Shipping Company Ltd and was at one point Nigeria's largest ship owner after extending control over the distribution of diesel products. One of his ships, a flat bottomed bunker vessel with a storage capacity of 16,000 metric tonnes, was the first of its kind in Africa.

In January 2006, Otedola was appointed a non-executive director of Transnational Corporation of Nigeria Plc, a multi-sectoral conglomerate established in 2004 by then-President Olusegun Obasanjo to respond to market opportunities requiring heavy capital investment in Nigeria and across sub-Saharan Africa. He held this post until February 2011.

Otedola has made a number of real estate investments, including a N2.3 billion acquisition in February 2007 by Zenon of Stallion House in Victoria Island in Lagos, from the Federal Government. The following month he was appointed chairman of the Transcorp Hilton Hotel in Abuja and tasked with driving its expansion and upgrade to a seven star facility. He is the owner of FO Properties Ltd. Otedola has been reported to be a financier of the People's Democratic Party and is said to have contributed N100 million to President Obasanjo's re-election expenses in 2003. He was a close ally of President Goodluck Jonathan. He has served as a member of the Nigerian Investment Promotion Council (NIPC) since 2004, and the same year was appointed to a committee tasked with developing commercial relations with South Africa.

In 2011, Otedola was appointed by President Goodluck Jonathan to Nigeria's National Economic Management Team.

In 2020, Forte Oil rebranded to Adrova PLC.

As at October 2021, Otedola was announced as the single largest shareholder (5.07%) of First bank PLC.

Since September 2024, Otedola has served as chairman of First HoldCo Plc, the holding company for First Bank of Nigeria, and has led a phased acquisition of shares in the institution, which he described as a "calculated commitment to rescue, rebuild and reposition" the bank after the Central Bank of Nigeria had considered a regulatory takeover due to governance failures and more than ₦2 trillion in bad loans on its balance sheet. By August 2026, his cumulative investment in the company had surpassed ₦600 billion, and he indicated he intended to raise his stake beyond 51 percent, describing the bank as a "long-term generational commitment" rather than an investment he intended to eventually exit, unlike his prior turnarounds of Forte Oil and Geregu Power. His holding, built through the investment vehicle Calvados Global Services, reached 11.96 billion shares, or roughly 25.87 percent of the company, and touched a record value of about $1.18 billion in early August 2026, as First HoldCo overtook Zenith Bank and Guaranty Trust Holding Company to become Nigeria's most valuable listed banking group.

== Controversy ==
=== Bribery and corruption ===
In 2012, Otedola was reported by reliable media houses to have given bribe to Boniface Emenalo and Farouk Lawan who was at then, the Chairman of the House Committee on Fuel Subsidy Regime, "integrity group" a sum of $620,000. The reason reported by witnesses, as pertains to the actions of Otedola, was that he wanted the name of his company removed from the list of firms indicted by Farouq Lawan's committee for abusing the fuel subsidy regime in 2012. Farouk Lawan and Boniface Emenalo were at risk of going to prison if found guilty of receiving money from Otedola as receiving of bribe by a government official is an offense punishable by Imprisonment.

On 2 February 2013, both Farouk Lawan and Boniface Emenalo were charged to court by Independent Corrupt Practices and other related Commission (ICPC) their trial was at the Capital Territory High Court in Abuja to face a seven-count charge of bribery, an offense that violates Section 10 (a) (ii) of ICPC Act, 2000 and punishable under Section 10 of that same Act.

Farouk Lawan pleaded not guilty, and initially so did Boniface Emenalo; however, events at the court of law took an unforeseen turn as Boniface Emenalo eventually admitted he was guilty and, in fact, had received several bribes on behalf of Farouk Lawan. Be that as it may, new evidence provided by the prosecution was very concrete, as Otedola was caught in a video of him giving a bribe and Farouk Lawan accepting it.

=== Canadian escorts ===
In December 2016, Otedola was embroiled in a controversy where two Toronto-based sisters—Jyoti and Kiran Matharoo —reportedly tried to extort him by cyberbullying and blackmail, claiming they had evidence of Otedola cheating on his wife that they would post on a notorious sex-scandal website. The sisters dispute Otedola's account. According to their account Jyoti met Otedola, straight out of University, in 2008. He whisked her and Kiran to Nigeria, and began an affair with him. They acknowledge that his gifts enriched them, as did gifts from other wealthy boyfriends, but dispute they ever engaged in blackmail, or even demanding gifts.

== Philanthropy ==
Otedola has made several donations to the Michael Otedola University Scholarship Scheme, which was established in 1985 to give underprivileged students in Lagos State access to higher education. In 2005 Zenon donated N200 million to the scheme's fund. Since its inception the scheme has benefited more than 1,000 students.

In 2005, Otedola made a N300 million personal donation to the completion of the National Ecumenical Centre—Nigeria's primary place of Christian worship—in Abuja. In 2007 he was among a group of donors who gave N200 million to the State Security Trust Fund in a drive to reduce crime in Lagos State. Later that year he donated N100 million to the Otedola College of Primary Education in Noforija, Epe.

In 2008 he donated N80 million to the Faculty of Agriculture at the University of Port Harcourt. Otedola fulfilled his pledge of 25,000 dollars to the Super Eagles in the match against Algeria in the 2019 AFCON.

== Published works ==
=== Making It Big: Lessons from a Life in Business (2025) ===
In August 2025, Femi Otedola published Making It Big: Lessons from a Life in Business, a memoir and business guide recounting his entrepreneurial journey and investment career. The book was officially released on 18 August 2025 and made available through major bookstores and online retail platforms.

The memoir details Otedola’s ventures across the oil and gas, shipping, power, real estate, and financial services sectors, including periods of financial setbacks and recovery. It also outlines his views on leadership, resilience, and long-term value creation, and includes reflections on personal and professional challenges.

Shortly after publication, the book entered Amazon’s bestseller rankings in business-related categories, reaching the No. 1 position in selected classifications.

The book received endorsements from public figures including Ngozi Okonjo-Iweala, Director-General of the World Trade Organization; Akinwumi Adesina, President of the African Development Bank; and Aliko Dangote, President and Chief Executive Officer of the Dangote Group.
