= Found (2012 film) =

- Theatrical poster
- Directed by: Scott Schirmer
- Written by: Scott Schirmer
- Based on: Found by Todd Rigney
- Produced by: Leya Taylor; Damien Wesner
- Starring: Gavin Brown; Ethan Philbeck; Phyllis Munro; Louie Lawless
- Cinematography: Leya Taylor
- Edited by: Scott Schirmer
- Music by: Mike Anderson
- Production company: Forbidden Films
- Distributed by: XLrator Media
- Release dates: July 14, 2012 (Bloomington, Indiana premiere)
- Running time: 103 minutes
- Country: United States
- Language: English

Found (stylized as found.) is a 2012 American horror film written and directed by Scott Schirmer. It is based on the novel of the same name by Todd Rigney. The October People picked up the distribution rights in 2014 after the film screened at various film festivals.

== Plot ==
12-year-old Marty tells the story of discovering his brother Steve is a serial killer when he took Steve's bowling ball bag and discovered a human head inside. Each week, Marty finds a new head, usually of a black woman, inside the bag hidden in Steve's closet. Marty keeps the discovery to himself and immerses himself in horror movies and comic books with his best friend, David.

A black classmate named Marcus bullies Marty at school. Marty refuses to fight back, which leads to a rumor that Marty tried to kiss Marcus. Marcus is given detention while Marty is sent home.

Marty sneaks into his brother's room but finds the bag is empty. He turns on Steve's stereo and puts on Steve's rubber gas mask. Steve enters and yells at his brother for being in his room. He then learns that his brother did not stick up for himself during his fight with Marcus.

Marty's mom takes Marty to the video store to rent movies for a sleepover with David. When he tries to rent an empty box for a strange movie titled Headless, the clerk informs him that the tape is missing.

Marty goes through his brother's VHS collection and finds the tape of Headless that was stolen from the store. Inside is a paper noting certain timestamps from the film. Marty and David watch the unrated movie, which turns out to be filled with sadistic, necrophilic content so graphic that it makes Marty uncomfortable, knowing his brother uses it for inspiration. David criticizes Marty for being a baby and says he no longer wants to be Marty's friend because no one likes him. Upset, Marty forces David to look inside Steve's bag, where they find Marcus' severed head. He tells him that if David tells anyone, Steve will kill him. Horrified, David gets sick, and his mother takes him home.

Steve realizes that his brother knows his secret and confronts him, demanding to be told how much he knows. He threatens Marty to keep quiet and later confesses that he only kills black people out of hatred for their race. He pledges that he will never harm his little brother. Marty struggles with how to handle himself and his brother's true nature.

Marty attends a church service with his mother but leaves, walking into the woods out of boredom. He ends up beating Trevor, a classmate, after Trevor bullies him. He refuses to apologize, claiming he only sticks up for himself when no one else will. When Marty returns home, his father begins striking him over the altercation at church. Steve starts beating his father and pushing his mother before his father kicks him out of the house.

That night, Marty secretly meets with his brother outside. Steve asks for his help with an unspecified plan, but Marty refuses. As they argue, their father comes outside, Steve hits him with a shovel, and runs inside after his mother. Marty sees his brother preparing to rape their mother and tries to stop him but is knocked unconscious.

Marty awakens tied to a bed with a ball gag in his mouth. He hears his mother screaming and crying in another room. Steve enters naked and wearing his gas mask, tells Marty to be quiet, grabs a machete, and proceeds to kill their parents. He comes back into the room completely covered in blood. Steve tells Marty that he will explain everything in the morning, but Marty only cries. Marty's reaction drives Steve mad, as he reassures himself he didn’t hurt Marty.

In the morning, Steve walks out of the house, still covered in blood. Marty wakes still tied up, to find himself surrounded by the mutilated bodies of his dead parents, echoing the kills of Headless. He wonders if he'll ever be found.

== Cast ==
- Gavin Brown as Martin ″Marty″, Steve's 12-year-old brother
- Ethan Philbeck as Steve, Marty's older brother, who is a serial killer
- Phyllis Munro as Martin and Steve's mother
- Louie Lawless as Martin and Steve's father

== Release ==
=== Censorship ===
Found was banned in Australia by the Australian Classification Board for "prolonged and detailed depictions of sexualised violence."

The film was later released on DVD with an R18+ rating after two minutes were cut.

The United Kingdom DVD release has 98 second' cut.

So far, only the US “Unrated” DVD and Blu-Ray release and the Austrian “Limited Uncut Collector’s Edition” containing both DVD and Blu-ray are uncut.

== Reception ==
The film received mixed to positive reviews. Patrick Dolan of Rue Morgue wrote that "[a]lthough this coming-of-age tale starts as a morbid love letter to horror's past (like a 1990s version of Joe Dante’s Matinee), it cleverly turns into an honest-to-goodness horror film part-way through and unleashes some serious scares." Bloody Disgusting also praised the film, which they felt made the most of its low budget and "impresses on a variety of levels".

Dennis Harvey of Variety gave the film a generally positive review, describing Found as an “intriguing, above-average genre effort” and an “ambitious and resourceful debut” for director Scott Schirmer, while noting that the film is “not entirely successful” and that its character development is limited.

Robert Abele of the Los Angeles Times gave the film a negative review, characterizing it as having “little redeeming value” and criticizing its graphic content and the film-within-a-film Headless for lingering on sexualized violence and extreme gore.

The Hollywood Reporter gave the film a mixed review, describing Found as a “genuinely disturbing serial killer thriller” and praising its unsettling naturalistic tone and off-screen handling of much of the violence, while noting that some supporting performances were uneven.

Nick Schager of Village Voice found that while Found did not fully explore its themes, it avoided gratuitous mockery and drew tension effectively.

== Sequel ==
It was announced in July 2014 that Headless, the film within a film from Found, was being made into a full-length film. Arthur Cullipher, the special effects supervisor and associate producer on Found, is set to direct. Donors from Kickstarter funded the film.
