= Soft Love =

- Directed by: Holmes Awa
- Written by: Paballo Molingoane
- Produced by: Paballo Molingoane
- Starring: Cindy Mahlangu; Efa Iwara; Rosemary Zimu; Dorcas Shola Fapson; Genoveva Umeh
- Cinematography: Ebrahim Eeb Hajee
- Edited by: Holmes Awa Paballo Molingoane
- Production companies: Nemsia Studios; Holmes Production
- Distributed by: Amazon Prime Video
- Release date: November 25, 2024
- Country: Nigeria
- Language: English

Soft Love is a 2024 romantic drama film directed by Holmes Awa and written by Paballo Molingoane. Produced by Nemsia Studios, the film was released on October 25, 2024, via Amazon Prime Video. It stars Cindy Mahlangu and Efa Iwara in leading roles, alongside Rosemary Zimu, Dorcas Shola Fapson, and Genovevo Umeh. A cross-continental production between South Africa and Nigeria. It was nominated for Best Cinematography and Best Editing award at the 2025 Africa Magic Viewers' Choice Awards

== Plot ==
Set across the scenic landscapes of South Africa and the vibrant cityscape of Lagos, Nigeria, the film follows Zandi Jele, a South African relationship expert whose seemingly perfect life is disrupted by a painful betrayal. Her journey toward healing takes a new turn when she meets Edward Obi, a Nigerian photographer with a mysterious past. As their romance blossoms, secrets threaten to unravel their bond.

== Cast ==
- Cindy Mahlangu as Zandi Jele
- Efa Iwara as Edward Obi
- Rosemary Zimu as Thandeka "TK"
- Dorcas Shola Fapson as Amaka Obi
- Genovevo Umeh as Chioma Obi
- Carol King as Mrs. Obi
- Danny Ross as Benji
- Sanda Shandu as Dumi

== Reception ==
Soft Love marks a collaborative effort between Nigerian and South African filmmakers. Holmes Awa directed and co-edited the film alongside writer-producer, Paballo Molingoane, with cinematography by Ebrahim Eeb Hajee. The film received a 6.6 rating on IMDb.

=== Nominations ===
Soft Love received 3 nominations at the 11th edition of the African Magic Viewers' Choice Awards (AMVCA)

- Best Editing – Nominated
- Best Cinematography - Nominated
- Best Score/Music – Nominated
