= Geregu nuclear power plant =

Nigerian nuclear plant project

- Country: Nigeria
- Location: Geregu, Kogi
- Coordinates: 7.57°N 6.69°E
- Status: Proposed
- Construction cost: US$10 billion

Nuclear power station
- Reactor type: VVER-1200
- Reactor supplier: Atomstroyexport

Power generation
- Units planned: 2 × 1,200 MW
- Nameplate capacity: 2,400 MW

The Geregu nuclear power plant is a twin-reactor nuclear power plant planned in Nigeria. The project foresees construction of two nuclear reactors supplied by Atomstroyexport and the plant would be located in Geregu, Kogi State.

It is part of efforts to find solution to the shortage of power supply in the country. According to the World Bank, more than 40% of the country was without electricity in 2014.

The Nigeria Atomic Energy Commission (NAEC) explained that the site had been selected for the construction of two nuclear reactors after due considerations. Preliminary licensing of the approved site is expected by the end of 2016 from the Nigerian Nuclear Regulatory Authority (NNRA) which has started the process of developing the license.

On 30 October 2017, Russia’s state-owned Rosatom and Nigeria have signed agreements for the construction and operation of the nuclear power plant.

The plant would be co-financed by Rosatom, which will build, own, operate and transfer (BOT) it to the Nigerian government. The estimated cost is about $10 billion.

In October 2022, Geregu became the first power company to list on Nigeria's Stock Exchange.
