= Tina Mba =

Nigerian actress

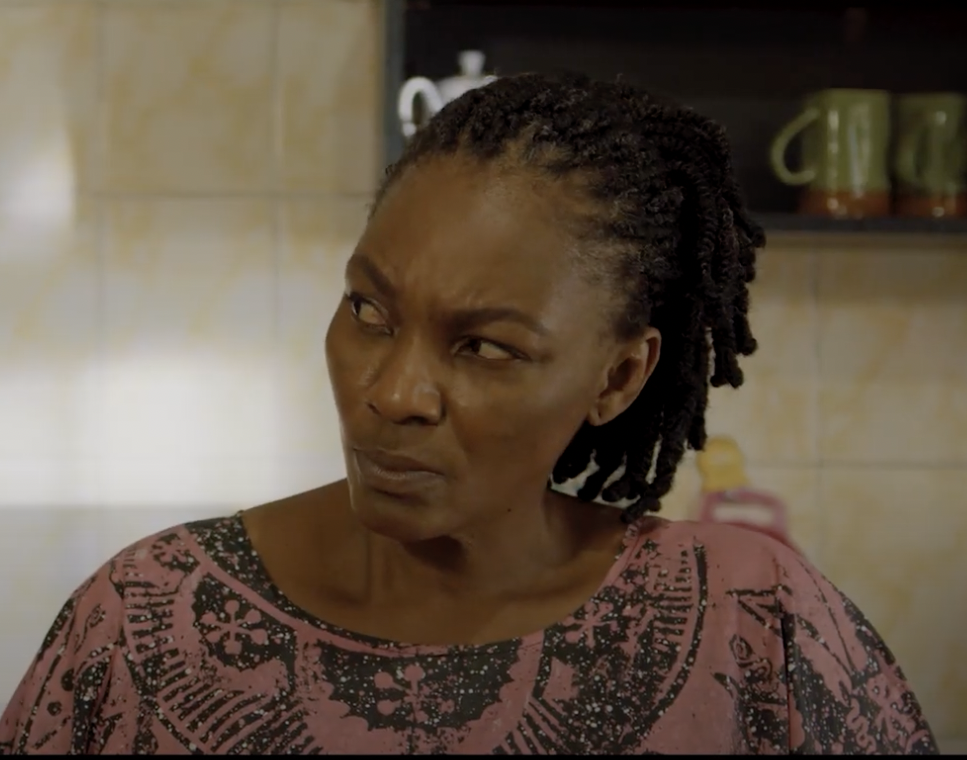
- Born: 2 October 1967; Enugu State
- Occupation: Actress
- Children: 2

Tina Mba // is a Nigerian actress who was nominated for Africa Movie Academy Award for Best Actress in a Supporting Role in the 7th Africa Movie Academy Awards.

== Career ==
In 2017, Mba starred in Isoken, Bariga Suger, Okafor's Law amongst other films and was described as "actress of the year" by Pulse. At the 2017 Africa Magic Viewers' Choice Awards, she was nominated for the best actress in a comedy category. In an interview with The Punch, she disclosed that the secret to her stellar interpretation of roles was from living the character and imagining herself in it. She also stated that she would have preferred theatre to feature films, if she was paid equally for both. In 2016, she acted in Ufuoma, a romantic drama, directed by Ikechukwu Onyeka. In October 2017, she starred in Omoye, which is an advocacy film against sexual violence. In 2017, she acted in the romantic comedy, Isoken alongside, Funke Akindele and Dakore Akande. She plays a mother, putting pressure on her daughter to get married and not be solely focused on her career. In the same year, YNaija recounts her previous roles in Tango with Me, Okafor's Law, Isoken, etc. while stating that her stellar performances are often not appreciated enough in the industry. It opined that the "Naija" body language she brings to her character gives more realistic expression to her roles.

In 2011, she received a nomination for Best Actress in a Supporting Role at the 7th Africa Movies Academy Award. Also in 2017, she was nominated for Best Actress in A Comedy at the 5th Africa Magic Viewer’s Choice Award for her performance in Meet the In-Laws.

=== Selected filmography ===
- Isoken (2017) as Mama Isoken
- Okafor's Law (2016) as Mom
- Make a Move (2014)
- Married but Living Single (2012) as Pastor
- Heroes and Zeroes (2012) as Tinuke Amos Fela
- Tango with Me (2010) as Ms. Jibike Bankole-Smith
- The Tenant (2008) as Obinna's Mother
- Beneath Her Veil (2015)
- Three Wise Men (2016)
- My Name is Kadi (2016) as Mrs. Hamilton
- Banana Island Ghost (2017) as Ijeoma's Mother
- The Bridge (2017) as Mrs. Maxwell
- Omoye (2017) as Aunty Chioma
- God Calling (2018) as Sade's Mother
- Nigerian Prince (2018) as Grace
- The Set Up (2019) as Madame
- Two Weeks in Lagos (2019) as Sisi Toyin
- For Maria Ebun Pataki (2020)
- Rise of the Saints (2020) as The Prophetess
- Tainted Canvas (2020) as Aunty Bisi
- Breaded Life (2021) Mrs. Cole
- Country Hard (2021) as Ochuko's Mum
- Unintentional (2021) as Uzor's Mother
- Ile Owo (2022)
- The Rise of Igbinogun (2022)
- Battle on Buka Street (2022) as Ezinne
- Orah (2023) as Mama
- Breath of Life (2023) as Mama Ayo
- Meeting Funmi's Parents (2024) as Toyin
- After 30 (2025)
- Brown Sugar (2025)

== Awards and nominations ==
Year	Award ceremony	Category	Film	Result	Ref
2020	Best of Nollywood Awards	Best Supporting Actress – English	This Lady Called Life	Nominated	

== Personal life ==
Mba was born in Delta State, Nigeria. However, she is a native of Enugu State. She is the first of seven children of her parents. She is a single mother with two children namely Tania and Joseph.
