= BB Sasore =

Nigerian filmmaker

- Born: Bodunrin Sasore
- Education: Rutgers University
- Occupations: Screenwriter, film director
- Known for: Banana Island Ghost; Before 30; God Calling

Bodunrin Sasore, commonly known as BB Sasore, is a Nigerian screenwriter, film director, and co-founder of Nemsia Studios. He is best known as the writer and director of God Calling, and Before 30.

== Education ==
Sasore holds a degree with majors in genetics and biochemistry from Rutgers University.

== Career ==
In 2013, Sasore co-founded Nemsia Studios with Derin Adeyokunnu, establishing a studio dedicated to producing high-quality, story-driven films.

== Filmography ==
- Soft Love (2024)
- Breath of Life (2023)
- God Calling (2018)
- Banana Island Ghost (2017)
- Before 30 (2015)
- Gidi Up (2013)
- Journey of an African Colony

== See also ==
- List of Nigerian film directors
