= Suky =

- Directed by: Ola Cardoso
- Written by: Isaac Ayodeji
- Produced by: Bamidele Adelusi
- Starring: Tobi Bakre; Femi Adebayo; Bimbo Ademoye; Boma Akpore; James Damilare
- Edited by: Holmes Awa
- Production companies: Nemsia Studios; Film Bank Production
- Distributed by: Amazon Prime Video
- Release date: 7 March 2025
- Running time: 109 minutes
- Country: Nigeria
- Language: Yoruba language

Suky is a 2025 Nigerian action film produced by Bamidele Adelusi, distributed through Nemsia Studios and directed by Ola Cardoso. The film stars Tobi Bakre, Bimbo Ademoye, James Damilare, Olarotimi Fakunle, Femi Adebayo, Ibrahim Yekini and others. Released to Amazon Prime Video on 7 March 2025, Suky revolves around underground Dambe boxing and follows a man driven by vengeance and the need to avenge his father's death, who finds himself caught in the boxing world and must fight for his freedom.

== Plot summary ==
A young boy named Suky was born into a Dambe boxing legacy, as his father was a champion of the sport. His life is shattered when he witnesses his father being killed right in front of him. Consumed by vengeance, Suky sets out to find the killer and avenge his father's death. He is soon framed for murder and sent to Aja Prison, where corrupt politicians and elites control an underground Dambe boxing competition. Suky rises to the top, defeating many opponents, during the competition. He ultimately fights the man who killed his father and must choose between revenge and honour.

== Selected cast ==
- Femi Adebayo as Senator
- Bimbo Ademoye as Dr. Simisola
- Boma Akpore as Igimu
- James Damilare as Suky
- Tobi Bakre as Adigun
- Rotimi Fakunle as Marshal
- Ibrahim Yekini as Ijaya

== Release and reception ==
Suky was released exclusively on Amazon Prime Video on 7 March 2025. The film's dialogue is almost entirely in the Yoruba language. Culture Custodian has described Suky as an "action film that loses to its unanswered question" because the character Suky was underdeveloped, leaving viewers unsure of what he had been doing prior to his imprisonment.
