= God Calling =

2018 Nollywood film

- Movie poster
- Directed by: Bodunrin Sasore
- Written by: Bodunrin Sasore
- Produced by: Omarinsojo Spaine, Heart in Motions pictures, Nemsia Studios
- Starring: Zainab Balogun; Kabiri Fubara; Richard Mofe Damijo; Tina Mba; Nkem Owoh; Onyeka Onwenu; Ademola Adedoyin; Patrick Diabuah; Eku Edewor
- Edited by: Holmes Ova
- Music by: Re Olungu
- Distributed by: Silverbird Distribution
- Release date: 22 December 2018
- Running time: 110 minutes
- Country: Nigeria
- Language: English
- Box office: ₦36 million

God Calling is a 2018 Nigerian Christian drama film written and directed by Bodunrin 'BB' Sasore. The film stars Zainab Balogun, Karibi Fubara, and Richard Mofe Damijo in the lead roles. The film made history in 2018 by preceding its cinema entry nationwide with over 10 million views of its teaser since its release and also being featured on CNN African Voices.

== Synopsis ==
It is a story of redemption that looks at the life of Sade, her family, and her faith through the lens of an unconventional encounter with God in this modern age.

== Cast ==
- Ademola Adedoyin as Angel
- Zainab Balogun as Sade
- Karibi Fubara as Francis
- Seun Ajayi as Tope
- Patrick Diabuah as Pastor
- Eku Edewor as Asa
- Diana Egwuatu as Lola
- Shawn Faqua as John
- Richard Mofe Damijo as Sade's Father
- Tina Mba as Sade's mother
- Onyeka Onwenu as Francis's Mother
- Nkem Owoh as Francis's Father

== Release ==
It was released theatrically in 2018.
