= Banana Island Ghost =

2017 Nigerian fantasy action comedy film

- Theatrical release poster
- Directed by: Bodunrin Sasore
- Written by: BB Sasore
- Produced by: Morinsojo Spaine; Tolu Olusoga
- Starring: Chioma "Chigul" Omeruah; Patrick Diabuah; Saheed Balogun; Ali Nuhu; Bimbo Manuel; Tina Mba
- Cinematography: Ola Cardoso
- Edited by: Seun Opabisi
- Music by: Enyi Omeruah
- Production companies: Biola Alabi Media; Nemsia Studios
- Distributed by: FilmOne Distributions
- Release date: August 4, 2017
- Running time: 107 minutes
- Country: Nigeria
- Languages: English; Yoruba
- Budget: ₦60 million

Banana Island Ghost (B.I.G) is a 2017 Nigerian fantasy action comedy film. The film was written and directed by BB Sasore and executively produced by Derin Adeyokunnu and Biola Alabi. It stars Chigul, Patrick Diabuah, Ali Nuhu, Saheed Balogun, Tina Mba and Bimbo Manuel.

== Plot ==
A man who dies from an accident is scared to go to heaven because he does not have a soulmate. He negotiates with God, who gives him three days to go back to earth and find one. He is paired with Ijeoma, who has three days to keep her father's house on Banana Island from being reclaimed by the bank.

== Cast ==
- Chioma "Chigul" Omeruah as Ijeoma
- Patrick Diabuah as Patrick (Ghost)
- Bimbo Manuel as God
- Saheed Balogun as Divisional Police Officer
- Ali Nuhu as Mr. King
- Tina Mba as Ijeoma's mother
- Akah Nnani as Sergeant
- Uche Jombo as Patrick's mother
- Kemi Lala Akindoju as Principal
- makida Moka as Indian Ninja
- Adetomiwa Edun as Akin
- Dorcas Shola Fapson as Akin's girlfriend
- Damilola Adegbite as herself (cameo)

== Reception ==
Nollywood Reinvented rated the film a 59% out of 100.
