= Breath of Life (2023 film) =

2023 Nigerian film

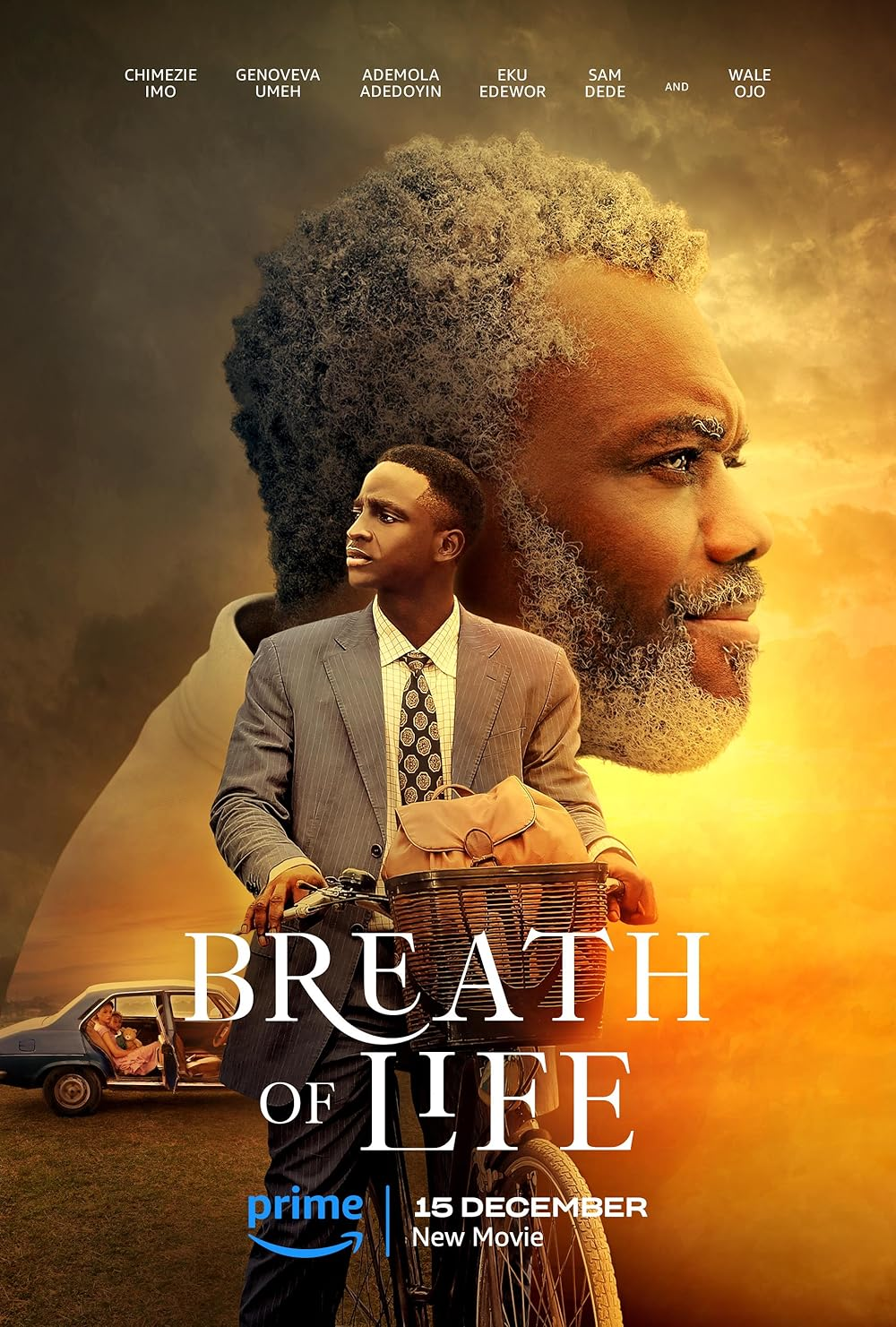
- Film poster
- Directed by: BB Sasore
- Written by: BB Sasore
- Produced by: BB Sasore; Eku Edewor; Derin Adeyokunnu
- Starring: Wale Ojo; Chimezie Imo; Genoveva Umeh; Ademola Adedoyin; Eku Edewor; Sam Dede
- Cinematography: Ola Cardoso
- Edited by: Holmes Awa
- Production companies: Amazon MGM Studios; Nemsia Films
- Distributed by: Prime Video
- Release dates: November 15, 2023 (Nigeria and Canada)
- Running time: 114 minutes
- Country: Nigeria
- Language: English

Breath of Life is a 2023 Nigerian drama film, written and directed by BB Sasore, who also produced it along with Derin Adeyokunnu and Eku Edewor. The film was released on 15 November 2023 and was distributed by Prime Video. It stars Wale Ojo, Chimezie Imo, Genoveva Umeh, Ademola Adedoyin, Eku Edewor, and Sam Dede.

Breath of Life premiered at the 2023 Africa International Film Festival (AFRIFF) and was the ceremony's closing film. The film was released to positive critical reviews. It was nominated for many awards, of which it won Best Picture at the 2024 Africa Magic Viewers' Choice Awards (AMCVA).

== Plot ==
Narrated by Elijah, the story follows Timi, a young man who excelled academically, spoke 16 languages and became the first African clergyman in the Church of England. After marrying Bridget and having a daughter, he returns to Nigeria, living a fulfilling life until tragedy strikes. His family falls victim to Baby Fire, a local thug, leading to a series of tragic events that turn Timi into a recluse. The film later introduces Elijah, who changes Timi's life and helps him rediscover his faith and purpose.

== Cast ==
- Wale Ojo as Old Timi: Wale Ojo portrays old Timi, who has settled into seclusion after tragedy strikes his family. He is a cold, grieving, and angry man who lives in isolation. He is properly introduced in the scene after his butler dies and is depicted driving off a man presumed to be applying for a position from his house with a loaded pistol. Old Timi is portrayed as a man who remains stuck in the past, evident in his choice of furnishings in the house and his cars. Despite not engaging much with the outside world, he is highly knowledgeable and keeps up with current issues by reading the daily papers. He later won the best actor at the AMVCA.
- Chimezie Imo as Elijah: Elijah is a bright-eyed youth who has just concluded his National Youth Service Corps (NYSC) service year and moves to Ibadan for greener pastures. He nurses an ambition to start a church, which is revealed to be his primary reason for moving into the town. His goal is to resuscitate the abandoned church built by Mr. Timi and to pastor the congregation. Elijah is depicted as valuing and prioritizing hard work and dedication to God above all else, even above his well-being. He embodies the son end of the father-son dynamic between him and Mr. Timi. Although Elijah is revealed to be an orphan, he embodies resilience and determination. Additionally, Elijah had breathing problems which endeared his character even more, as it occasionally served as comic relief or manifested when he was anxious or fearful. This aspect revealed Elijah's human and relatable side beyond his super benevolent, nearly angelic quality.
- Ademola Adedoyin as Young Timi: Young Timi is the quintessential highly gifted and accomplished character. At the beginning, it is revealed that he "spoke 16 languages, 4 of which were extinct," graduated top of his class in Cambridge, and was the highest-honored cadet in the British Navy. He was also one of the youngest people to become a clergy member in the Church of England. The film revealed that on July 3, 1953, he broke the world record for the youngest man to hold his breath underwater, spanning 57 minutes and 18 seconds. However, Young Timi moved back to mid-western Nigeria in the 1960s during the country's independence with his wife and young daughter, Alison, after his father's death. He then rebuilt and started a church in the town where he lived in Ibadan, Nigeria.
- Eku Edewor as Bridget: Bridget is the wife of the protagonist Timi, and it is revealed that she met him in Cambridge. They have a daughter named Alison, and she moves back with him to Nigeria when his father dies. She stands out in the small town she moves into, sporting an ensemble of vintage English wardrobes that seamlessly enhance her role and serve as a reminder of where the protagonist once was (England) and, in many ways, who he is as well.
- Genoveva Umeh as Anna: Anna serves as the romantic interest of Elijah. She is a bold, confident, and fiery character who balances and challenges Elijah, encouraging him to fight for what he wants. Despite coming from a more financially buoyant background than Elijah, she never allows it to hinder their relationship or her connection with the townsfolk. Anna volunteers at the town's medical center and helps Elijah learn new values of determination and confidence. Throughout the film, she also grows as a character influenced by Elijah's values of faith, loyalty, and humility.
- Chiedozie Nzeribe Sambasa as Baby Fire: Baby Fire is one of the film's major antagonists. He leads the Baby Fire gang, manipulated by colonial masters to sow chaos and terror among the townspeople. Described as someone who enjoys watching destruction unfold, he is vengeful, menacing, and portrayed as a sadist. Baby Fire's role in the film is pivotal; he orchestrates the inciting incident that disrupts Mr. Timi's comfortable and idyllic life, plunging him into darkness and seclusion, setting the stage for the major plot to unfold.
- Bimbo Manuel as Mr. Coker: Mr. Coker serves as Mr. Timi's lawyer, managing all aspects of his affairs including properties, business, and investments. He keeps Mr. Timi informed of necessary matters and ensures that everything is taken care of, recognizing Mr. Timi's inclination to avoid public appearances. Mr. Coker is not only Mr. Timi's legal representative but also his confidant and one of his oldest friends, having been present even before tragedy struck. When Mr. Timi faces a significant decision at the end, he confides in Mr. Coker and entrusts him with carrying out the task in his absence. Their relationship is characterized by trust, mutual understanding, and camaraderie.
- Sam Dede as Chief Okonkwo: Chief Okonkwo is Anna's father, a prominent businessman and the primary antagonist obstructing Elijah's dream of becoming a pastor. He is portrayed as a stern and influential figure who prioritizes securing financial gain and safeguarding his interests above all else. Chief Okonkwo's staunch opposition poses a significant obstacle to Elijah's aspirations and creates tension in the narrative.
- Ashionye Michelle Raccah as Mrs. Okonkwo: Mrs. Okonkwo is Anna's mother, a middle-aged, regal, and affluent woman married to one of the richest and most influential individuals in the town. She epitomizes the affluent housewife, prioritizing family, homemaking, and her husband's interests, which in turn rewards her with a lavish lifestyle. Devoted to her husband, she takes his side to secure his business interests, even if it means going against her daughter's wishes and risking a rift between them.
- Melanie Atari as Alison: Alison is the young daughter of Mr. Timi, born in England and later moved to Nigeria at a very young age. She is portrayed as a mini-version of her mother, Bridget, resembling her in looks, fashion choices, and carriage. This resemblance highlights the strong connection and influence between mother and daughter, contributing to the depth of their characters within the narrative.
- Hugh Thorley as Magistrate: The Magistrate was a British judge who presided over the case against the townspeople and Baby Fire, wielding authority over legal matters in the town.
- Tina Mba as Mama Ayo: Mama Ayo is a dedicated member of the town's community who regularly attends services at Elijah's church. Her unwavering commitment to the church is evident as she stands by Elijah's side to protect it from demolition. Additionally, Mama Ayo's bold style choices and makeup reflect her effort to stay fashionable for the period, adding depth and intrigue to her character.

== Reception ==
=== Viewership ===
According to flixpatrol.com, after the release of Breath of Life on Amazon Prime Video, the film held a top 10 position in 11 countries for 43 days with an average of 20 points per day. These countries include Armenia, Benin, Cameroon, Ghana, Malawi, Nigeria, Qatar, Rwanda, Togo, Uganda, and Zambia. The film secured the number 1 spot in Nigeria and Ghana.

=== Critical reception ===
On the review aggregator website IMDb, Breath of Life holds a modest 5.7/10, with an average user rating of 7.8/10. It earned high praise from Nigerian film critic Cinemapointer, who labeled it "Sterling" with a 5-star rating. Onu Stephen of Premium Times also commends the film's technical aspects, stating that its "meticulous cinematography, costumes, and settings transport viewers to the story's heart," giving it an 8/10 rating. Frank Eleanya of Business Day lauds the film for delivering "one of the most stunning storytelling Nollywood has ever known" and highly recommends it. Seyi Lasisi of Afrocritik describes the film as "grand and ambitious filmmaking" that will "permanently be the definition of grand and ambitious filmmaking." The Nollywood Reporter positively reviews it as "a tale of renewed drive and purpose." Tony Asankomah of GhMovieFreak states that the film is "a testament to the limitless potential of great storytelling when coupled with stellar execution." Finally, Nollywire gives a rating of 9.2/10 describing the film as an “inspirational story about life and destiny where one must live to fulfill their purpose and cannot die until this is done.” Overall, Breath of Life elicited a range of positive reviews for its technical prowess and storytelling.
