= Africa Movie Academy Award for Best Film =

The Africa Movie Academy Award for Best Film is an annual merit by the Africa Film Academy to recognise the best African films of the preceding year. It was known as the Best Picture award from 2005 to 2011.

Best Film
| Year | Film | Director | Result |
|---|---|---|---|
| 2005 | The Mayors | Dickson Iroegbu | Won |
| 2006 | Rising Moon | Andy Nwakolor | Won |
| 2006 | Secret Adventure | Andy Amenechi | Nominated |
| 2006 | Behind Closed Door | Lancelot Oduwa Imasuen | Nominated |
| 2006 | Anini | Fred Amata | Nominated |
| 2006 | Arrou - Prevention | | Nominated |
| 2006 | Tanyaradzwa | | Nominated |
| 2006 | My Mother’s Heart | Ifeanyi Onyeabor | Nominated |
| 2006 | Sofia | Boubakar Diallo | Nominated |
| 2007 | Sitanda | Izu Ojukwu | Won |
| 2007 | The Amazing Grace | Jeta Amata | Nominated |
| 2007 | Apesin | Muyiwa Ademola | Nominated |
| 2007 | Abeni | Tunde Kelani | Nominated |
| 2008 | Run Baby Run | Emmanuel Apea | Won |
| 2008 | White Waters | Izu Ojukwu | Nominated |
| 2008 | Across the Niger | Izu Ojukwu & Kingsley Ogoro | Nominated |
| 2008 | Princess Tyra | Frank Rajah Arase | Nominated |
| 2008 | Mission to Nowhere | Teco Benson | Nominated |
| 2008 | 30 Days | Mildred Okwo | Nominated |
| 2009 | From a Whisper | Wanuri Kahiu | Won |
| 2009 | Arugba | Tunde Kelani | Nominated |
| 2009 | Gugu and Andile | Minky Schlesinger | Nominated |
| 2009 | Battle of the Souls | Matt Bish | Nominated |
| 2009 | Seventh Heaven | Saad Hendawy | Nominated |
| 2010 | The Figurine | Kunle Afolayan | Won |
| 2010 | Seasons of a Life | Shemu Joyah | Nominated |
| 2010 | The Tenant | Jude Idada & Lucky Ejim | Nominated |
| 2010 | The Perfect Picture | Shirley Frimpong-Manso | Nominated |
| 2010 | I Sing of a Well | Leila Jewel Djansi | Nominated |
| 2011 | Viva Riva! | Djo Tunda Wa Munga | Won |
| 2011 | Sinking Sands | Leila Djansi | Nominated |
| 2011 | Aramotu | Niji Akanni | Nominated |
| 2011 | Soul Boy | Hawa Essuman | Nominated |
| 2011 | Hopeville | John Trengove | Nominated |
| 2011 | A Small Town Called Descent | Jahmil X.T. Qubeka | Nominated |
| 2012 | How to Steal 2 Million | Charlie Vundla | Won |
| 2012 | State of Violence | Khalo Matabane | Nominated |
| 2012 | Adesuwa | Lancelot Oduwa Imasuen | Nominated |
| 2012 | Otelo Burning | Sara Blecher | Nominated |
| 2012 | Rugged Priest | Bob Nyanja | Nominated |
| 2012 | Ties That Bind | Leila Djansi | Nominated |
| 2012 | Man on Ground | Akin Omotoso | Nominated |
| 2013 | Confusion Na Wa | Kenneth Gyang | Won |
| 2013 | Nairobi Half Life | David 'Tosh' Gitonga | Nominated |
| 2013 | Ninah’s Dowry | Victor Viyuoh | Nominated |
| 2013 | The Last Fishing Boat | Shemu Joyah | Nominated |
| 2013 | Virgin Margarida | | Nominated |
| 2013 | Elelwani | Ntshavheni Wa Luruli | Nominated |
| 2013 | Last Flight to Abuja | Obi Emelonye | Nominated |
| 2014 | Of Good Report | Jamil X.T Quebeka | Won |
| 2014 | Children of Troumaron | Harrikrishna & Sharvan Anenden | Nominated |
| 2014 | Potomanto | Shirley Frimpong-Manso | Nominated |
| 2014 | The Forgotten Kingdom | Andrew Mudge | Nominated |
| 2014 | Accident | Teco Benson | Nominated |
| 2015 | Timbuktu | Abderrahmane Sissako | Won |
| 2015 | October 1 | Kunle Afolayan | Nominated |
| 2015 | Triangle Going to America | Theodros Teshome Kebede | Nominated |
| 2015 | iNumber Number | Theo Nel | Nominated |
| 2015 | Run | Phillipe Lacote | Nominated |
| 2016 | Eye of the Storm | Sékou Traoré | Won |
| 2016 | The Cursed Ones | Nana Obiri Yeboah | Nominated |
| 2016 | Fifty | Biyi Bandele | Nominated |
| 2016 | Ayanda | Sara Blecher | Nominated |
| 2016 | La Pagne | Mousa Hamadou Djingarey | Nominated |
| 2016 | Dry | Stephanie Linus | Nominated |
| 2016 | Tell Me Sweet Something | Akin Omotoso | Nominated |
| 2016 | Behind Closed Doors | Muhammed Bensouda | Nominated |
| 2017 | Félicité | Alain Gomis | Won |
| 2017 | The Last of Us | Ala Eddine Slim | Nominated |
| 2017 | A Mile in My Shoes | Said Khallaf | Nominated |
| 2017 | '76 | Izu Ojukwu | Nominated |
| 2017 | Vaya | Akin Omotoso | Nominated |
| 2017 | 93 Days | Steve Gukas | Nominated |
| 2017 | Queen of Katwe | Mira Nair | Nominated |
| 2017 | Wulu | Daouda Coulibaly | Nominated |
| 2017 | Call Me Thief | Daryne Joshua | Nominated |
| 2018 | Five Fingers for Marseilles | Michael Matthews | Won |
| 2018 | Isoken | Jadesola Osiberu | Nominated |
| 2018 | In My Country | Frank Rajah Arase | Nominated |
| 2018 | The Blessed Vost | Sofia Djama | Nominated |
| 2018 | Cross Roads | Seyi Siwoku | Nominated |
| 2018 | The Road to Sunrise | Shemu Joyah | Nominated |
| 2018 | Siembamba | Darrell Roodt | Nominated |
| 2018 | A Hotel Called Memory | Akin Omotoso | Nominated |
| 2018 | Side Chick Gang | Peter Sedufia | Nominated |
| 2018 | The Lost Cafe | Kenneth Gyang | Nominated |
| 2019 | The Mercy of the Jungle | Joël Karekezi | Won |
| 2019 | Rafiki | Wanuri Kahiu | Nominated |
| 2019 | The Delivery Boy | Adekunle Adejuyigbe | Nominated |
| 2019 | Ellen: The Ellen Pakkies Story | Daryne Joshua | Nominated |
| 2019 | Sew the Winter to My Skin | Jahmil X.T. Qubeka | Nominated |
| 2019 | Redemption | Mickey Fonseca | Nominated |
| 2019 | King of Boys | Kemi Adetiba | Nominated |
| 2019 | Urgent | Mohcine Besri | Nominated |
| 2020 | The Milkmaid | Desmond Ovbiagele | Won |
| 2020 | The Ghost and the House of Truth | Akin Omotoso | Nominated |
| 2020 | The Fisherman’s Diary | Enah Johnscott | Nominated |
| 2020 | Knuckle City | Jahmil X.T. Qubeka | Nominated |
| 2020 | 40 Sticks | Victor Gatonye | Nominated |
| 2020 | Desrances | Apolline Traoré | Nominated |
| 2020 | This Is Not a Burial, It's a Resurrection | Lemohang Jeremiah Mosese | Nominated |
| 2020 | Gold Coast Lounge | Pascal Aka | Nominated |
| 2021 | The Gravedigger's Wife | Khadar Ayderus Ahmed | Won |
| 2021 | Mission to Rescue | Gilbert Lukalia | Nominated |
| 2021 | Fried Barry | Ryan Kruger | Nominated |
| 2021 | Stain | Morris Mugisha | Nominated |
| 2021 | Eyimofe | Arie Esiri and Chuko Esiri | Nominated |
| 2021 | Hairareb | Oshoveli Shipoh | Nominated |
| 2021 | Nyara: The Kidnapping | Ram Ally Kasongo | Nominated |
| 2021 | Black Medusa | Youssef Chebbi & Ismael | Nominated |
| 2022 | Tug of War | Amil Shivji | Won |
| 2022 | Ayaanle | Ahmed Farah | Nominated |
| 2022 | Jolly Roger | Walter Taylaur | Nominated |
| 2022 | Borga | York-Fabian Raabe | Nominated |
| 2022 | Angeliena | Uga Carlini | Nominated |
| 2022 | Man of God | Bolanle Austen-Peters | Nominated |
| 2022 | Surviving Gaza | Vusi'Africa Sindane | Nominated |
| 2022 | Tembele | Morris Mugisha | Nominated |
| 2023 | Xalé | Moussa Sene Absa | Won |
| 2023 | Mami Wata | C.J. 'Fiery' Obasi | Nominated |
| 2023 | 4-4-44 | Izu Ojukwu | Nominated |
| 2023 | Omen | Baloji | Nominated |
| 2023 | 4 Walls | Juvais Dunn and Kgosana Monchusi | Nominated |
| 2023 | Sira | Apolline Traoré | Nominated |
| 2023 | Anikulapo | Kunle Afolayan | Nominated |
| 2024 | The Weekend | Khadar Ayderus Ahmed | Won |
| 2024 | Under The Hanging Tree | Perivi Katjavivi | Nominated |
| 2024 | This is Lagos | Kenneth Gyang | Nominated |
| 2024 | A Smile, A Wink and A Tear | Izu Ojukwu | Nominated |
| 2024 | Orah | Lonzo Nzekwe | Nominated |
| 2024 | Letters to Goddo | Harry Bentil | Nominated |
| 2024 | The Queenstown Kings | Jahmil X.T. Qubeka | Nominated |
| 2025 | The Heart is a Muscle | Imran Hamdulay | Won |
| 2025 | 3 Cold Dishes | Oluseyi Asurf | Nominated |
| 2025 | Algiers | Chakib Taleb-Bendiab | Nominated |
| 2025 | Small Gods | Asher Rosen | Nominated |
| 2025 | For Love, For Land, For Power | Theodros Teshome | Nominated |
| 2025 | Katanga: Dance of The Scorpions | Dani Kouyaté | Nominated |
| 2025 | Last Stop | Kwabena Gyansah | Nominated |
| 2025 | Lisabi: The Uprising | Niyi Akinmolayan | Nominated |
