= Africa Movie Academy Award for Best Director =

The Africa Movie Academy Award for Best Director is an annual merit by the Africa Film Academy to recognise the best director of an African film for the year.

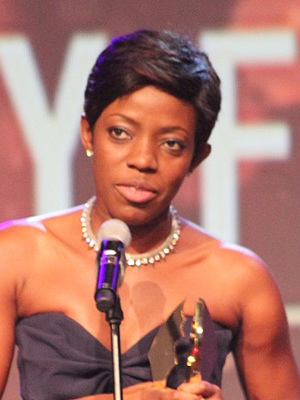
2010 Best Director Shirley Frimpong-Manso

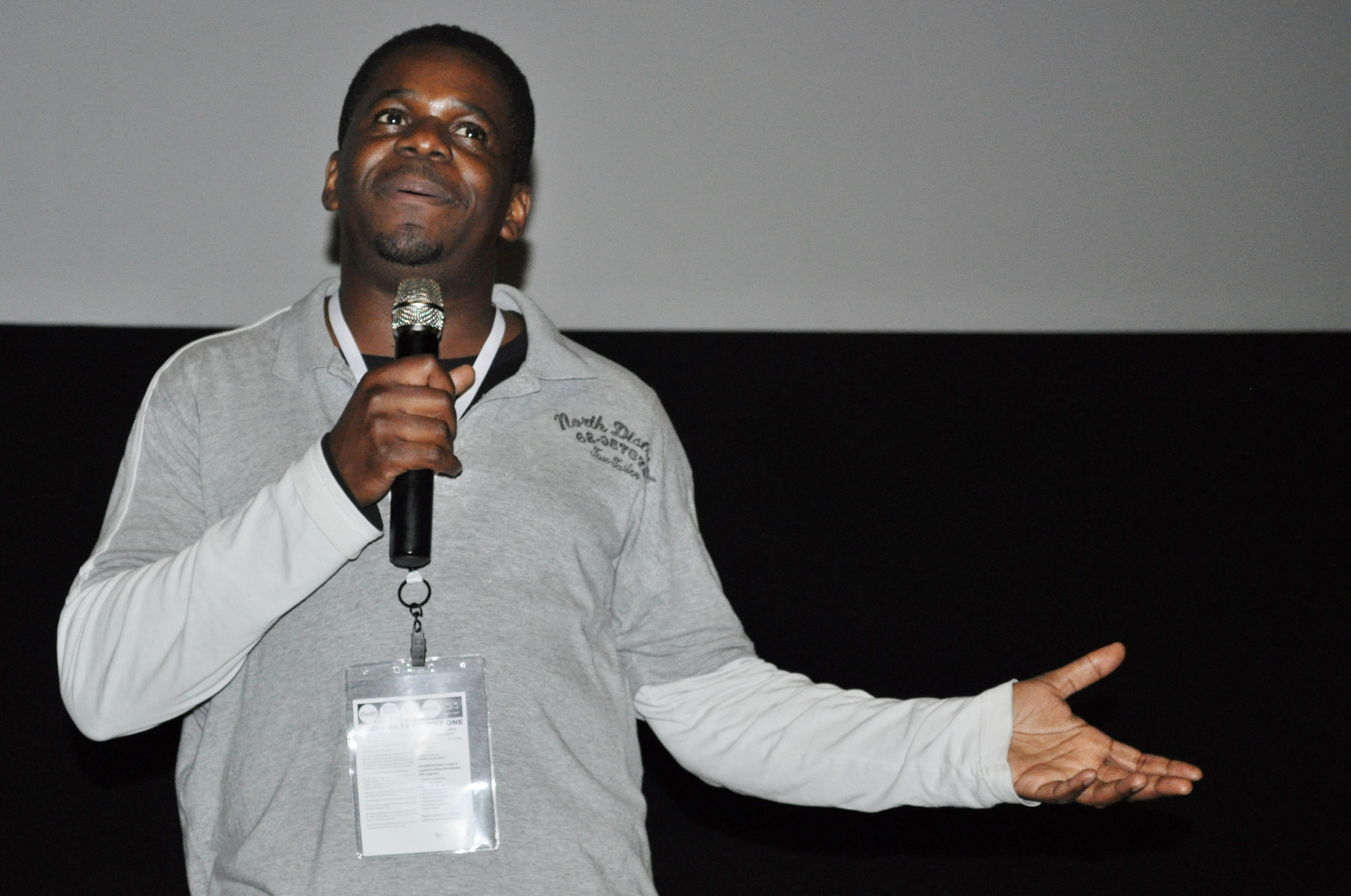
2011 Best Director Djo Tunda Wa Munga

Best Director
Year	Director	Film	Result
2005	Dickson Iroegbu	The Mayors	Won
2006	Andy Nwakalor	Rising Moon	Won
2006	Lancelot Oduwa Imasuen	Behind Closed Door	Nominated
2006	Andy Amenechi	Secret Adventure	Nominated
2006	Lancelot Oduwa Imasuen	Family Battle	Nominated
2006	Fred Amata	Anini	Nominated
2006	Teco Benson	Day of Atonement	Nominated
2006	Ifeanyi Onyeabor	My Mother’s Heart	Nominated
2006	Boubakar Diallo	Sofia	Nominated
2007	Izu Ojukwu	Sitanda	Won
2007	Muyiwa Ademola	Apesin	Nominated
2007	Jeta Amata	The Amazing Grace	Nominated
2007	Tunde Kelani	Abeni	Nominated
2008	Emmanuel Apea	Run Baby Run	Won
2008	Izu Ojukwu	White Waters	Nominated
2008	Frank Rajah Arase	Princess Tyra	Nominated
2008	Izu Ojukwu & Kingsley Ogoro	Across the Niger	Nominated
2008	Bond Emoruwa	Check Point	Nominated
2008	Teco Benson	Mission To Nowhere	Nominated
2008	Ifeanyi Onyeabor	New Jerusalem	Nominated
2008	Mildred Okwo	30 Days	Nominated
2009	Wanuri Kahiu	From a Whisper	Won
2009	Tunde Kelani	Arugba	Nominated
2009	Minky Schlesinger	Gugu and Andile	Nominated
2009	Math Bish	Battle of the Soul	Nominated
2009	Saad Hendawy	Seventh Heaven	Nominated
2010	Shirley Frimpong-Manso	The Perfect Picture	Won
2010	Shemu Joyah	Seasons of a Life	Nominated
2010	Kunle Afolayan	The Figurine	Nominated
2010	Leila Djansi	I Sing of a well	Nominated
2010	Jude Idada & Lucky Ejim	The Tenant	Nominated
2011	Djo Tunda Wa Munga	Viva Riva!	Won
2011	Hawa Essuman	Soul Boy	Nominated
2011	Oliver Hermanus	Shirley Adams	Nominated
2011	Niji Akanni	Aramotu	Nominated
2011	Jahmil X.T. Qubeka	A Small Town Called Descent	Nominated
2011	Leila Djansi	Sinking Sands	Nominated
2012	Charlie Vundla	How to Steal 2 Million	Won
2012	Lancelot Oduwa Imasuen	Adesuwa	Nominated
2012	Leila Djansi	Ties That Bind	Nominated
2012	Bob Nyanja	Rugged Priest	Nominated
2012	Khalo Matabane	State of Violence	Nominated
2012	Akin Omotoso	Man On Ground	Nominated
2012	Sara Blecher	Otelo Burning	Nominated
2013	Niji Akanni	Heroes and Zeros	Won
2013	Kenneth Gyang	Confusion Na Wa	Nominated
2013	Shemu Joyah	The Last Fishing Boat	Nominated
2013	Shirley Frimpong-Manso	The Contract	Nominated
2013	David 'Tosh' Gitonga	Nairobi Half Life	Nominated
2013	Ntshavheni Wa Luruli	Elelwani	Nominated
2014	Jahmil Qubeka	Of Good Report	Won
2014	Harrikrishna & Sharvan Anenden	Children of Troumaron	Nominated
2014	Shirley Frimpong-Manso	Potomanto	Nominated
2014	Andrew Mudge	The Forgotten Kingdom	Nominated
2014	Teco Benson	Accident	Nominated
2015	Abderrahmane Sissako	Timbuktu	Won
2015	Theodros Teshome Kebede	Triangle: Going to America	Nominated
2015	Theo Nel	iNumber Number	Nominated
2015	Philippe Lacôte	Run	Nominated
2015	Kunle Afolayan	October 1	Nominated
2016	Nana Obiri Yeboah	The Cursed Ones	Won
2016	Biyi Bandele	Fifty	Nominated
2016	Sékou Traoré	Eye of the Storm	Nominated
2016	Sara Blecher	Ayanda	Nominated
2016	Mousa Hamadou Djingarey	La Pagne	Nominated
2016	Stephanie Linus	Dry	Nominated
2016	Akin Omotoso	Tell Me Sweet Something	Nominated
2016	Muhammed Bensouda	Behind Closed Doors	Nominated
2017	Akin Omotoso	Vaya	Won
2017	Daouda Coulibaly	Wùlu	Nominated
2017	Steve Gukas	93 Days	Nominated
2017	Mira Nair	Queen of Katwe	Nominated
2017	Izu Ojukwu	76	Nominated
2017	Daryen Joshua	Call Me Thief	Nominated
2017	Alain Gomis	Félicité	Nominated
2017	Ala Eddine Slim	The Last Of Us	Nominated
2017	Said Khallaf	A Mile in My Shoes	Nominated
2018	Frank Rajah Arase	In My Country	Won
2018	Safia Djama	The Blessed Vost	Nominated
2018	Jade Osiberu	Isoken	Nominated
2018	Michael Mathews	Five Fingers For Marseilles	Nominated
2018	Oluseyi Siwoku	Cross Roads	Nominated
2018	Shemu Joyah	Road to Sunshine	Nominated
2018	Darrell Roodt	Siembamba	Nominated
2018	Akin Omotoso	Hotel Called Memory	Nominated
2018	Peter Kofi Sedufia	Sidechic Gang	Nominated
2018	Kenneth Gyang	The Lost Café	Nominated
2019	Jahmil X.T. Qubeka	Sew the Winter to My Skin	Won
2019	Wanuri Kahiu	Rafiki	Nominated
2019	Adekunle Adejuyigbe	The Delivery Boy	Nominated
2019	Daryne Joshua	Ellen: The Ellen Pakkies Story	Nominated
2019	Kemi Adetiba	King of Boys	Nominated
2019	Mohcine Besri	Urgent	Nominated
2019	Mickey Fonseca	Redemption	Nominated
2019	Joël Karekezi	The Mercy of the Jungle	Nominated
2020	Jeremiah Lemohang Mosese	This is Not a Burial, It's a resurrection	Won
2020	Akin Omotoso	The Ghost and House of Truth	Nominated
2020	Enah Johnscott	A Fisherman’s Diary	Nominated
2020	Jahmil X.T Quebeka	Knuckle City	Nominated
2020	Desmond Ovbiagele	The Milkmaid	Nominated
2020	Victor Gatonye	40 Sticks	Nominated
2020	Appoline Traore	Desrances	Nominated
2020	Pascal Aka	Gold Coast Lounge	Nominated
2021	Chuko Esiri & Ayie Esiri	Eyimofe	Won
2021	Gilbert Lukalia	Mission to Rescue	Nominated
2021	Ryan Kruger	Fried Barry	Nominated
2021	Khadar Ahmed	The Gravedigger's Wife	Nominated
2021	Morris Mugisha	Stain	Nominated
2021	Oshoveli Shipoh	Hairareb	Nominated
2021	Ram Ally Kasongo	Nyara/The Kidnapping	Nominated
2021	Youssef Chebbi & Ismael	Black Medusa	Nominated
