= Africa Movie Academy Award for Best Nigerian Film =

- Country: Nigeria
- Presented by: Africa Film Academy
- First award: 2007
- Currently held by: Eyimofe (2021)
- Website: www.ama-awards.com

The Africa Movie Academy Award for Best Nigerian Film is an annual merit by the Africa Film Academy to recognize the best Nollywood film for the year. It was introduced in the 2007 edition as "Best Nigerian Film" but was renamed as "Heart of Africa" award in the 4th to 6th editions. Since the 7th edition, it has been renamed again to "Best Nigerian Film".

== Winners and nominees ==
Best Nigerian Film
Year	Film	Director	Result
2007	Sitanda	Izu Ojukwu	Won
2007	Apesin	Muyiwa Ademola	Nominated
2007	The Amazing Grace	Jeta Amata	Nominated
2007	Abeni	Tunde Kelani	Nominated
2008	Across the Niger	Izu Ojukwu	Won
2008	Checkpoint	Bond Emoruwa	Nominated
2008	New Jerusalem	Ifeanyi Onyeabor	Nominated
2008	White Waters	Izu Ojukwu	Nominated
2009	Arugba	Tunde Kelani	Won
2009	Cindy’s Note	Izu Ojukwu	Nominated
2009	Beautiful Soul	Tchidi Chikere	Nominated
2009	State of the Heart	Kingsley Omoife and Richard Mofe Damijo	Nominated
2009	Jenifa	Muhydeen S. Ayinde	Nominated
2010	The Figurine	Kunle Afolayan	Won
2010	Nnenda	Izu Ojukwu	Nominated
2010	Freedom in Chain	Bond Emeruwa and Fred Amata	Nominated
2010	The Child	Izu Ojukwu	Nominated
2010	High Blood Pressure	Teco Benson	Nominated
2011	Aramotu	Niji Akanni	Won
2011	Maami	Tunde Kelani	Nominated
2011	Tango With Me	Mahmood Ali-Balogun	Nominated
2011	Inale	Jeta Amata	Nominated
2011	A Private Storm	Lancelot Oduwa Imasuen and Ikechukwu Onyeka	Nominated
2012	Adesuwa	Lancelot Oduwa Imasuen	Won
2012	Unwanted Guest	Daniel Ademinokan	Nominated
2012	Family on Fire	Tade Ogidan	Nominated
2012	Phone Swap	Kunle Afolayan	Nominated
2012	Alero's Symphony	Izu Ojukwu	Nominated
2013	Confusion Na Wa	Kenneth Gyang	Won
2013	Blood and Henna	Kenneth Gyang	Nominated
2013	Heroes and Zeros	Niji Akanni	Nominated
2013	Meeting	Mildred Okwo	Nominated
2013	The Twin Sword	Geofrey Gania	Nominated
2013	Kokomma	Tom Robson	Nominated
2013	Okoro The Prince	Charles Uwagbai	Nominated
2014	Accident	Teco Benson	Won
2014	Apaye	Desmond Elliot	Nominated
2014	B for Boy	Chika Anadu	Nominated
2014	Murder at Prime Suites	Eneaji Chris Eneng	Nominated
2014	Omo Elemosho	Adebayo Tijani	Nominated
2015	October 1	Kunle Afolayan	Won
2015	Invasion 1897	Lancelot_Oduwa_Imasuen	Nominated
2015	Dazzling Mirage	Tunde Kelani	Nominated
2015	Iyore	Frank Rajah Arase	Nominated
2015	A Place in the Stars	Steve Gukas	Nominated
2016	Dry	Stephanie Linus	Won
2016	Beyond Blood	Greg Odutayo	Nominated
2016	Fifty	Biyi Bandele	Nominated
2016	Falling	Niyi Akinmolayan	Nominated
2016	Missing God	Ubaka Joseph Ugochukwu	Nominated
2016	O-Town (film)	C. J. Obasi	Nominated
2017	'76	Izu Ojukwu	Won
2017	The CEO	Kunle Afolayan	Nominated
2017	93 Days	Steve Gukas	Nominated
2017	Ayamma	Chris Eneaji	Nominated
2017	Oloibiri	Curtis Graham	Nominated
2017	Green White Green	Abba Makama	Nominated
2018	Isoken	Jadesola Osiberu	Won
2018	A Hotel Called Memory	Akin Omotoso	Nominated
2018	Cross Roads	Oluseyi Siwoku	Nominated
2018	The Lost Cafe	Kenneth Gyang	Nominated
2018	Icheke Oku	Emeka Amakeze	Nominated
2018	Ojukokoro	Dare Olaitan	Nominated
2018	In My Country	Frank Rajah Arase	Nominated
2019	King of Boys	Kemi Adetiba	Won
2019	Knockout Blessing	Dare Olaitan	Nominated
2019	Make Room	Robert O. Peters	Nominated
2019	Up North	Tope Oshin	Nominated
2019	Gold Statue	Tade Ogidan	Nominated
2019	The Delivery Boy	Adekunle Adejuyigbe	Nominated
2019	Lara and the Beat	Tosin Coker	Nominated
2020	The Milkmaid	Desmond Ovbiagele	Won
2020	Cold Feet	Moses Inwang	Nominated
2020	Living in Bondage: Breaking Free	Ramsey Nouah	Nominated
2020	4th Republic	Ishaya Bako	Nominated
2020	For Maria: Ebun Pataki	Damilola Orimogunje	Nominated
2020	The Bling Lagosians	Bolanle Austen-Peters	Nominated
2020	Coming From Insanity	Akinyemi Sebastian Akinropo	Nominated
2020	The Ghost and The House of Truth	Akin Omotoso	Nominated
2021	Eyimofe	Arie Esiri & Chuko Esiri	Won
2021	Rattlesnake: The Ahanna Story	Ramsey Nouah	Nominated
2021	Ayinla	Tunde Kelani	Nominated
2021	The Citation	Kunle Afolayan	Nominated
2021	Omo Ghetto: The Saga	Funke Akindele and JJC Skillz	Nominated
2021	La Femme Anjola	Mildred Okwo	Nominated
2021	Collision Course	Bolanle Austen-Peters	Nominated
2021	Shadow Parties	Yemi Amodu	Nominated
