= Africa Movie Academy Award for Best Cinematography =

Annual merit by Africa Film Academy

The Africa Movie Academy Award for Best Cinematography is an annual merit by the Africa Film Academy to reward the Best use of camera in a film.

Best Cinematography
Year	Film	Cinematographer	Result
2005	Abuja Connection		Won
2006	Tanyaradzwa		Won
2006	Day of Atonement		Nominated
2006	Rising Moon		Nominated
2006	Family Battle		Nominated
2006	Sofia		Nominated
2006	My Mother's Heart		Nominated
2007	The Amazing Grace		Won
2007	Abeni		Nominated
2007	Mokili		Nominated
2007	Sitanda		Nominated
2008	White Waters		Won
2008	Run Baby Run		Nominated
2008	Across the Niger		Nominated
2008	Princess Tyra		Nominated
2008	Mission to Nowhere		Nominated
2008	30 Days		Nominated
2009	Cindy’s Note	Izu Ojukwu	Won
2009	From a Whisper	Marius Van Graan	Nominated
2009	Seventh Heaven	Ramses Marzouk	Nominated
2009	Gugu and Andile	Greg Heimann	Nominated
2009	Battle of the Soul	Stephen Njero and Tony Matomi	Nominated
2010	The Figurine		Won
2010	The Perfect Picture		Nominated
2010	I Sing of a Well		Nominated
2010	The Child		Nominated
2010	The Tenant		Nominated
2011	Viva Riva!		Won
2011	Sinking Sands		Nominated
2011	Izulu lami		Nominated
2011	Maami		Nominated
2011	Hopeville		Nominated
2012	Otelo Burning		Won
2012	How to Steal 2 Million		Nominated
2012	Rugged Priest		Nominated
2012	Masquerades		Nominated
2012	Man on Ground		Nominated
2013	Uhlanga the Mark		Won
2013	Virgin Magarida		Nominated
2013	Nairobi Half Life		Nominated
2013	Swirl In Bamako		Nominated
2013	The Twin Sword		Nominated
2013	Sherifa		Nominated
2013	Elelwani		Nominated
2014	The Forgotten Kingdom		Won
2014	Once Upon A Road Trip		Nominated
2014	Good Old Days: Love of AA		Nominated
2014	Of Good Report		Nominated
2014	The Children of Troumaron		Nominated
2015	Lonbraz Kann		Won
2015	Triangle Going to America		Nominated
2015	iNumber Number		Nominated
2015	Run		Nominated
2015	Timbuktu		Nominated
2016	The Cursed Ones		Won
2016	Fifty		Nominated
2016	Ayanda		Nominated
2016	Eye of the Storm		Nominated
2016	Tell Me Sweet Something		Nominated
2017	The Last of Us		Won
2017	The Whale Caller		Nominated
2017	Félicité		Nominated
2017	Vaya		Nominated
2017	A Mile in My Shoes		Nominated
2018	Five Fingers for Marseilles		Won
2018	The Road To Sunshine		Nominated
2018	The Lost Café		Nominated
2018	The Blessed Vost		Nominated
2018	Siembamba		Nominated
2019	Sew the Winter to My Skin		Won
2019	Mabata Bata		Nominated
2019	Mother, I Am Suffocating. This Is My Last Film About You		Nominated
2019	Redemption		Nominated
2019	Rafiki		Nominated
2019	The Delivery Boy		Nominated
2019	The Burial of Kojo		Nominated
2020	This Is Not a Burial, It's a Resurrection		Won
2020	The Ghost and House of Truth		Nominated
2020	The Fisherman’s Diary		Nominated
2020	Knuckle City		Nominated
2020	The Milkmaid		Nominated
2020	40 Sticks		Nominated
2020	Desrances		Nominated
2020	Gold Coast Lounge		Nominated
2021	Ayinla		Won
2021	Black Medusa		Nominated
2021	Stain		Nominated
2021	Nyara (The Kidnapping)		Nominated
2021	The Gravedigger’s Wife		Nominated
