= Africa Movie Academy Award for Best Actress in a Supporting Role =

African film award

The Africa Movie Academy Award for Best Actress in a Supporting Role is an annual merit by the Africa Film Academy to recognize and reward actresses in a supporting role in a film.

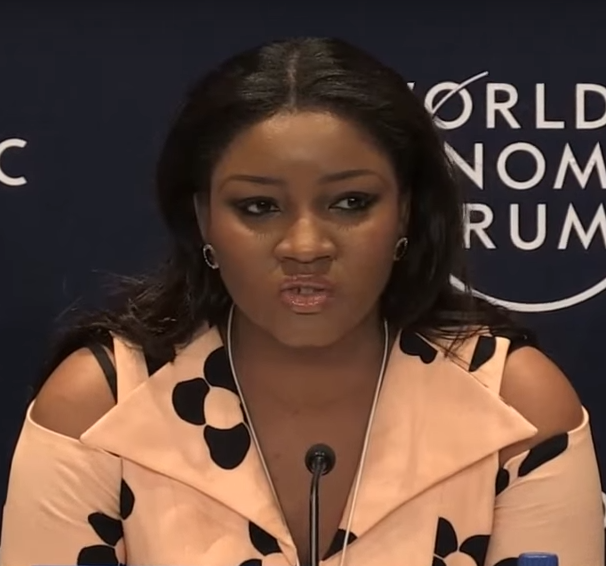
2005 Best Supporting Actress winner Omotola Jalade Ekeinde

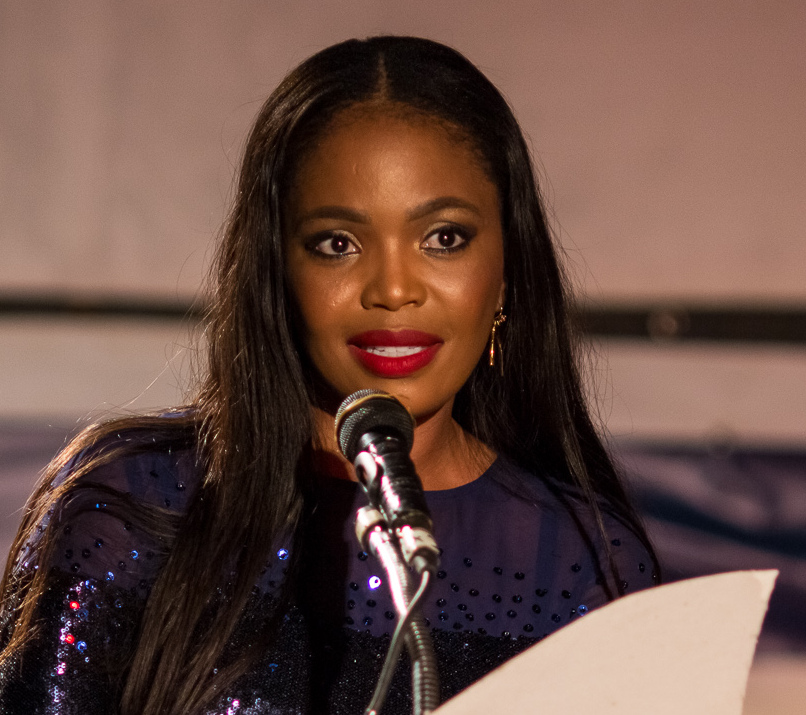
2012 Best Supporting Actress winner Terry Pheto

Best Actress (Supporting role)
Year	Nominees	Film	Result
2005	Omotola Jalade Ekeinde		Won
2006	Onyeka Onwenu	Widow’s Cot	Won
2006	Oge Okoye	Eagle’s Bride	Nominated
2006	Georgina Onuoha	Secret Adventure	Nominated
2006	Adji Dialo	Sofia	Nominated
2006	Awa Gassama	Arrou (Prevention)	Nominated
2007	Jackie Aygemang	Beyonce: The President's Daughter	Won
2007	Noelie Funmi Agbendegba	Abeni	Nominated
2007	Ireti Doyle	Sitanda	Nominated
2008	Joke Silva	White Waters & 30 Days	Won
2008	Ireti Doyle	Across the Niger	Nominated
2008	Yhama Brew	Princess Tyra	Nominated
2008	Patience Ozokwor	New Jerusalem	Nominated
2008	Bimbo Akintola	Cash Money	Nominated
2008	Uche Jombo	Keep My Will	Nominated
2009	Mercy Johnson	Live to Remember	Won
2009	Aggie Kebirungi	Battle of the Soul	Nominated
2009	Mosun Filani	Jenifa	Nominated
2009	Daphney Hlomuka	Gugu and Andile	Nominated
2009	Chika Ike	The Assassin	Nominated
2010	Tapiwa Gwaza	Seasons of a life	Won
2010	Doris Sakitey	A Sting in a Tale	Nominated
2010	Funlola Aofiyebi-Raimi	The Figurine	Nominated
2010	Yvonne Nelson	Heart of Men	Nominated
2011	Marlene Longage	Viva Riva!	Won
2011	Mary Twala	Hopeville	Nominated
2011	Joyce Ntalabe	The Rivaling Shadow	Nominated
2011	Tina Mba	Tango With Me	Nominated
2011	Yvonne Okoro	Pool Party	Nominated
2012	Terry Pheto	How to Steal 2 Million	Won
2012	Ebbe Bassey	Ties That Bind	Nominated
2012	Empress Njamah	Bank Job	Nominated
2012	Ngozi Ezeonu	Adesuwa	Nominated
2012	Thelma Okoduwa	Mr. and Mrs.	Nominated
2012	Omotola Jalade Ekeinde	Ties That Bind	Nominated
2013	Hermelinda Cimela	Virgin Magarida	Won
2013	Patience Ozokwor	Turning Point	Nominated
2013	Linda Ejiofor	Meeting	Nominated
2013	Crista Eka	Ninah’s Dowry	Nominated
2013	Foluke Daramola	Cobweb	Nominated
2014	Patience Ozokwor	After the Proposal	Won
2014	Vinaya Sungkur	The Children of Troumaron	Nominated
2014	Marie Humbert	Potomanto	Nominated
2014	Barbara Soky	Brother's Keeper	Nominated
2014	Lee-Ann van Rooi	Of Good Report	Nominated
2015	Hilda Dokubo	Stigma	Won
2015	Ama Ampofo	Devil in the Detail	Nominated
2015	Toulou Kiki	Timbuktu	Nominated
2015	Reina Salicoulibaly	Run	Nominated
2015	Prossy Rukundo	Boda Boda Thieves	Nominated
2016	Thishiwe Ziqubu	Tell Me Sweet Something	Won
2016	Maureen Okpoko	Missing God	Nominated
2016	Ijeoma Grace Agu	Jimi Bendel/Taxi Driver	Nominated
2016	Bontle Modiselle	Hear Me Move	Nominated
2016	Nthati Moshesh	Ayanda	Nominated
2016	Linda Ejiofor	Out of Luck	Nominated
2017	Angelique Kidjo	The CEO	Won
2017	Inna Modja	Wulu	Nominated
2017	Theresa Edem	Ayamma	Nominated
2017	Taiwo Ajai-Lycett	Oloibiri	Nominated
2017	Nomonde Mbusi	Vaya	Nominated
2017	Somkele Iyamah	93 Days	Nominated
2018	Joke Silva	Potato Potahto	Won
2018	Sika Osei	In Line	Nominated
2018	Sivenathi Mabuya	Lucky Specials	Nominated
2018	Rahama Sadau	Hakkunde	Nominated
2018	Toyin Abraham	Esohe	Nominated
2018	Somkele Iyamah	93 Days	Nominated
2019	Adesua Etomi	King of Boys	Won
2019	Eniola Shobayo	Knockout Blessing	Nominated
2019	Linda Ejiofor	Knockout Blessing	Nominated
2019	Kandyse McClure	Sew the Winter to My Skin	Nominated
2019	Joke Silva	Light in the Dark	Nominated
2019	Arlete Bombe	Redemption	Nominated
2020	Maryam Booth	The Milkmaid	Won
2020	Charmaine Mujeri	Mirage	Nominated
2020	Linda Ejiofor	4th Republic	Nominated
2020	Ndamo Damarise	The Fisherman's Diary	Nominated
2020	Tina Mba	The Set Up	Nominated
2020	Faniswa Yisa	Knuckle City	Nominated
2020	Evelyne Juhen	Desrances	Nominated
2021	Hazel Hinda	Hairareb	Won
2021	Gloria Anozie-Young	Rattlesnake: The Ahanna Story	Nominated
2021	Naana Hayford	Chasing Lullaby	Nominated
2021	Tumi Morake	Seriously Single	Nominated
2021	Ini Edo	The Citation	Nominated
2022	Ijeoma Grace Agu	Swallow	Won
2022	Lydia Forson	Borga	Nominated
2022	Samke Makhoba	Surviving Gaza	Nominated
2022	Siti Amina	Tug of War	Nominated
2022	Maryam S. Wazari	Ba Ni (Mud Clan)	Nominated
2022	Dorcas Shola-Fapson	Man of God	Nominated
2022	Nse Ikpe-Etim	A Song from the Dark	Nominated
2023	Rokhaya Niang	Xalé	Won
2023	Uzoamaka Aniunoh	Mami Wata	Nominated
2023	Clarck Ntambwe	Fight Like a Girl	Nominated
2024	Elsie Chidera Abang	The Wall Street Boy (Kipkemboi)	Won
2024	Meg Otanwa	The Weekend	Nominated
2024	Enhle Mbali Mlotshwa	The Queenstown Kings	Nominated
2024	Tessa Twala	The Queenstown Kings	Nominated
2024	Bukunmi Oluwasina	White and Black	Nominated
2024	Somkele Iyamah-Idhalamah	Orah	Nominated
2024	Chioma Akpotha	Mojisola	Nominated
