= Africa Movie Academy Award for Best Production Design =

Annual merit to reward the best art direction in movies

The Africa Movie Academy Award for Best Production Design is an annual merit by the Africa Movie Academy Awards to reward the best art direction in a film for the year. It was introduced in 2008 as Achievement in Art Direction but was renamed to Best Production Design since the 2011 edition.

Best Production Design
Year	Film	Art Direction	Result
2008	New Jerusalem		Won
2008	Rival		Nominated
2008	Across the Niger		Nominated
2008	30 Days		Nominated
2008	Iranse Aje		Nominated
2008	Princess Tyra		Nominated
2009	Small Boy	Michelle Bello	Won
2009	Five Apostles	Ifeanyi Onyeabor	Nominated
2009	Agony of the Christ	Jude Odoh	Nominated
2009	From a Whisper	Kaye Tuckerman	Nominated
2009	Revolution	Eddybongo Uka	Nominated
2010	Fulani		Won
2010	I Sing of a Well		Nominated
2010	The Child		Nominated
2010	The Figurine		Nominated
2010	Imani		Nominated
2011	Viva Riva!		Won
2011	Tango With Me		Nominated
2011	Hopeville		Nominated
2011	6 Hours To Christmas		Nominated
2011	Maami		Nominated
2012	Phone Swap		Won
2012	Somewhere in Africa		Nominated
2012	Otelo Burning		Nominated
2012	Adesuwa		Nominated
2012	How to Steal 2 Million		Nominated
2013	Elelwani		Won
2013	Virgin Magarida		Nominated
2013	The Twin Sword		Nominated
2013	Contract		Nominated
2013	Blood And Henna		Nominated
2013	Okoro The Prince		Nominated
2014	A Northern Affair		Won
2014	Of Good Report		Nominated
2014	Ni Sisi		Nominated
2014	Good Old Days: Love of AA		Nominated
2014	Apaye		Nominated
2015	iNumber Number		Won
2015	October 1		Nominated
2015	Le President		Nominated
2015	Run		Nominated
2015	Timbuktu		Nominated
2016	The Cursed Ones		Won
2016	Ayanda		Nominated
2016	Missing God		Nominated
2016	A Soldier's Story		Nominated
2016	Out of Luck		Nominated
2017	76		Won
2017	Call Me Thief		Nominated
2017	Félicité		Nominated
2017	Queen of Katwe		Nominated
2017	The Last of Us		Nominated
2018	Five Fingers for Marseilles		Won
2018	Kada River		Nominated
2018	Tatu		Nominated
2018	In My Country		Nominated
2018	Cross Roads		Nominated
2019	Redemption		Won
2019	Rafiki		Nominated
2019	Urgent		Nominated
2019	Ellen: The Ellen Pakkies Story		Nominated
2019	Sew the Winter to My Skin		Nominated
2019	The Delivery Boy		Nominated
2019	The Burial of Kojo		Nominated
2019	The Mercy of the Jungle		Nominated
2020	Knuckle City		Won
2020	Ratnik		Nominated
2020	Zulu Wedding		Nominated
2020	Perfect Picture: Ten Years Later		Nominated
2020	This is Not A Burial, It’s a resurrection		Nominated
2020	Foreigner’s God		Nominated
2020	Gold Coast Lounge		Nominated
2020	The Ghost and the House of Truth		Nominated
2021	The Gravedigger’s Wife		Won
2021	The Takers		Nominated
2021	Nyara (The Kidnapping)		Nominated
2021	Tecora		Nominated
2021	Shadow Parties		Nominated
