= Of Good Report =

2013 film

- Film poster
- Directed by: Jahmil X.T. Qubeka
- Starring: Mothusi Magano; Petronella Tshuma
- Release date: 9 August 2013
- Running time: 109 minutes
- Country: South Africa
- Language: Xhosa

Of Good Report is a 2013 South African thriller film directed by Jahmil X.T. Qubeka. The film had Mothusi Magano and Petronella Tshuma in lead roles. At the 10th Africa Movie Academy Awards, it received the most nominations and awards, and won the AMAA's Award for Best Film. The film was screened at the 2013 Toronto International Film Festival.

In July 2013, on the day it was to open the 34th Durban International Film Festival, it was banned by the National Film and Video Foundation for containing "child pornography". The decision was later overturned after an appeal by the producers of the film. In November 2022, Of Good Report opened the Africa Rising International Film Festival (ARIFF) and given "the premier it never had".

== Cast ==
- Mothusi Magano as Parker Sithole
- Petronella Tshuma as Nolitha Ngubane
- Tshamano Sebe as Vuyani
- Lee-Ann Van Rooi as Const. Arendse
- Tina Jaxa as Headmistress
- Thobi Mkhwanazi as Squeeza
- Nomhle Nkonyeni as Landlady
- Lihlebo Magugu as Sipho
- Frances Ndlazilwana as Grandmother
- Mary Twala as Esther Sithole

== Plot ==
The film tells a story of an inappropriate and obsessive romantic relationship between a high school teacher and one of his female students.

== Reception ==
=== Reviews ===
Guy Lodge for Variety praised the attempt by Qubeka in the script that captures concerns of post apartheid South Africa that is not based on racial segregation, but violence and patriarchal sexuality. The adoption of black and white sequence of images, as opposed to coloured was also highlighted as adding a positive uniqueness to the film. He summarized its review by stating "Jahmil X.T. Qubeka's striking but grisly feature swerves wildly from obsessive student-teacher romance into splattery horror."

Peter Bradshaw for The Guardian rated it 4/5, applauding the story, linearity and the entire atmosphere of the film. Deborah Young for Hollywood Reporter explained "Qubeka's unconventional talent makes sparks fly in a raw thriller that gently mocks genre and leaves a troubling after-taste".

=== Accolades ===
- Africa Movie Academy Award for Best Film (won)
- Africa Movie Academy Award for Best Director (won)
- Africa Movie Academy Award for Best Actor (won)
- Africa Movie Academy Award for Best Actor in a Supporting Role
- Africa Movie Academy Award for Best Supporting Actress
- Africa Movie Academy Award for Most Promising Actor (won)
- Africa Movie Academy Award for Best Screenplay (won)
- Africa Movie Academy Award for Best Editing
- Africa Movie Academy Award for Best Cinematography
- Africa Movie Academy Award for Best Sound
- Africa Movie Academy Award for Best Visual Effects
- Africa Movie Academy Award for Best Soundtrack
- Africa Movie Academy Award for Best Production Design
