= Adejuyigbe =

Adéjuyìgbé
- Gender: Male
- Language: Yoruba

Origin
- Origin: Nigeria
- Meaning: Royalty has prevented honour from being wasted/destroyed.
- Region of origin: South West, Nigeria

Adéjuyìgbé is a Nigerian surname of Yoruba origin, typically bestowed upon males. It means "Royalty has prevented honour from being wasted/destroyed.". Adéjuyìgbé is a powerful name with depth and profound meaning. This name is common among the Ondo people of the Southwest, Nigeria.

== Notable individuals with the name ==
- Adekunle Adejuyigbe, Nigerian filmmaker and producer
- Demi Adejuyigbe (born 1992), American writer, comedian, and social media personality
- Kunle Adejuyigbe (born 1977), Nigerian sprinter
