= OC Ukeje =

Nigerian actor

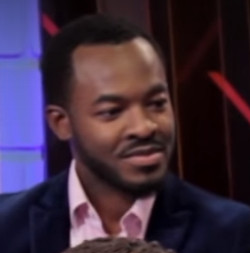
- Born: Okechukwu Ukeje; 15 July 1981 (age 45); Lagos State, Nigeria
- Education: University of Lagos
- Occupations: Film actor, model, musician
- Years active: 2007— present
- Television: Amstel Malta Box Office realiyTV Show
- Spouse: Senami Ibukunoluwa Togonu-Bickersteth (m. 2014)
- Awards: 2008 Africa Movie Academy Awards for Most Promising Actor

Okechukwu Ukeje// , known as OC Ukeje is a Nigerian actor, model and musician. He came into prominence after winning the Amstel Malta Box Office (AMBO) reality show. He has received several awards including Africa Movie Academy Awards, Africa Magic Viewers Choice Awards, Nollywood Movies Awards, Best of Nollywood Awards, Nigeria Entertainment Awards and Golden Icons Academy Movie Awards. He has featured in several award-winning films including Two Brides and a Baby, Hoodrush, Alan Poza, Confusion Na Wa and Half of a Yellow Sun.

== Early life ==
Okechukwu Ukeje, is a native of Umuahia, the capital city of Abia State, southeastern region of Nigeria. He was born and raised in Lagos State, southwestern Nigeria. He is the second child of a family of three.

== Career ==
He attended Federal Government College Ijanikin, Ojo, Lagos. He began his career in acting from his first year at the University of Lagos, Yaba, with a lead role in a stage play. He went on to pursue both music and acting, focusing mainly on acting in stage plays for the first four years of his career before attempting and winning a reality TV show, Amstel Malta Box Office (AMBO). His first screen appearance was in White Waters (2007) with Joke Silva and Rita Dominic. The film was directed by Izu Ojukwu. He won the Africa Movie Academy Awards (AMAA) for the Most Promising Actor (2008) and the City People's Award for Best New Act (2010).

He continued to write music, collaborating with a few Nigerian musical artists and producers and working on radio jingles for corporate organizations. He has worked in movies and television between 2008 and 2012.

He was a member of the cast of the TV series that was presented at the International Emmy World Television Festival, Wetin Dey (2007) produced by the BBC World Service Trust and played lead and supporting lead roles in films like Comrade, Confusion Na Wa and Awakening. He was also featured in Black November (2012) by Jeta Amata with cast members including Mickey Rourke, Kim Basinger, Sarah Wayne-Callies, Hakeem Kae-Kazim, Vivica Fox and a host of others. He was also in the film adaptation of Chimamanda Ngozi Adichie's Half of a Yellow Sun (2013) with Chiwetel Ejiofor and Thandiwe Newton as the lead cast, directed by Biyi Bandele. He was on the repertory team that showcased 3 stage plays for the Nigeria House at the London Cultural Olympiad (2012). He also acted in the BFI sponsored film, Gone Too Far. He was in NdaniTV's series Gidi Up with Titilope Sonuga, Deyemi Okanlawon, Somkele Iyamah and Ikechukwu Onunaku. In January 2015, he was listed by Nigerian Cinema Exhibition Coalition as one of the highest box office grosser of 2014.

In 2016, he was invited with Somkele Iyamah to attend the Toronto International Film Festival as "rising stars".

== Personal life ==
Ukeje lives in Lagos, Nigeria. He married Senami Ibukunoluwa Togonu-Bickersteth on 8 November 2014. . He attended Federal Government College (Ijanikin) Lagos, Nigeria, and finished in 1998.

== Filmography ==
Year	Film	Role	Ref
2007	White Waters	Melvin	
2008	Comrade	Hakeem	
2011	Black Gold	Peter Gadibia	
2011	Two Brides and a Baby	Badmus	
2012	Black November	Peter Gadibia	
2012	Hoodrush	Shez Jabari	
2012	Till Death Do Us Part (Short)	John	
2013	Confusion Na Wa	Charles Duka	
2013	Alan Poza	Alan Poza	
2013	Half of a Yellow Sun	Aniekwena	
2013	Awakening	Nicholas	
2013	Gone Too Far	Iku	
2013	The Rubicon	David	
2013	Secret Room	Kingsley Ojei	
2014	When Love Happens	Dare	
2014	Gidi Up (TV Series)	Obi (2014 – )	
2014	A Play Called a Temple Made of Clay (Short)	Hakeem	
2015	The Department	Segun	
2015	Before 30	Ayo (2015-)	
2016	The Arbitration	Mr. Gbenga	
2016	Remember me	Micheal Tamuno	
2016	North East	Emeka Okafor	
2017	Potato Potahto	Mr. Tony Wilson	
2017	Catch.er	Detective Komolafe	
2017	The Royal Hibiscus Hotel	Felix	
2018	Shades of Attraction		
2018	In Sickness and Health	Priye Martin	
2019	Heaven's Hell	Ahmed	
2019	Unbreakable	Chidi	
2019	Ashen		
2020	Shine Your Eye	Amadi	
2022	Black mail	Ray Chinda	
2022	Brotherhood	Izra	
2023	Departure (Season 3)	Agent Manning	
2023	Orah	Agent Uche Odi	
2024	Happiness Is		
2025	After 30		

== Awards ==
Year	Award	Category	Film	Result	Ref
2008	Africa Movie Academy Awards	Most Promising Actor	White Waters	Won	
2012	Africa Movie Academy Awards	Best Actor in a Leading Role	Confusion Na Wa	Nominated	
2013	Nigeria Entertainment Awards	Best Lead Actor in a Film	Alan Poza	Won	
2013	Best of Nollywood Awards	Best Lead Actor in an English Movie	Alan Poza	Won	
2013	Nollywood Movies Awards	Best Actor in a Lead Role	Hoodrush	Won	
2013	Africa Magic Viewers Choice Awards	Best Actor in a Drama	Two Brides and a Baby	Won	
2015	Africa Magic Viewers Choice Awards	Best Actor in a Drama	Secret Room	Won	
2015	Africa Magic Viewers Choice Awards	Best Actor in a Drama	Confusion Na Wa	Nominated	
2015	Africa Magic Viewers Choice Awards	Best Actor in a Supporting Role	When Love Happens	Nominated	
2019	Best of Nollywood Awards	Best Actor in a Lead role – English	Unbreakable	Nominated	
