= La Femme Anjola =

2021 Nigerian Film

- Directed by: Mildred Okwo
- Written by: Tunde Babalola
- Starring: Rita Dominic Nonso Bassey; Joke Silva; Femi Jacobs Aderounmu Adejumoke
- Release date: March 19, 2021
- Country: Nigeria
- Language: English

La Femme Anjola is a 2021 film written by Tunde Babalola and directed by Mildred Okwo. It is a film noir psychological thriller which stars Rita Dominic and Nonso Bassey. It was released in cinemas on March 19, 2021.

== Synopsis ==
La Femme Anjola revolves around a stockbroker who fell in love with a mysterious woman. Anjola is married to a gangster who owns a nightclub where she does live performances.

== Cast ==
- Rita Dominic as Anjola
- Nonso Bassey as Dejare
- Joke Silva
- Femi Jacobs as Kolapo
- Aderounmu Adejumoke as Adanna
- Ego Boyo as Yejide Johnson
- Bassey Ekpeyong as Biggie
- Uzor Osimkpa
- Paul Adams as Danladi
- Joseph Momodu as Okilo
- Shawn Faqua as Tayo Kalajaye
- Michelle Dede
- Mumbi Maina as Thabisa
- Soso Soberekon as Timipre Otobo

== Production and release ==
The trio of Mildred Okwo, Tunde Babalola and Rita Dominic reunited for this production since the release of their 2012 film, The Meeting.

The film was reported to be removed from Film House Cinemas across Nigeria to make way for the movie Prophetess. Speaking in an interview with The Cable newspapers, director Okwo blamed the action on monopoly in the Nigerian film industry. She mentioned that the same cinema company had removed her 2015 film Surulere, under controversial circumstances. Public reactions following the removal affirmed Okwo's take, and she mentioned that she is planning to go digital via her company's online platforms and streaming services.

== Awards and nominations ==
Year	Award	Category	Recipient	Result	Ref
2021	Africa Movie Academy Awards	Best Actor in a Leading Role	Nonso Bassey	Nominated	
2021	Africa Movie Academy Awards	Best Actress in a Leading Role	Rita Dominic	Nominated	
2021	Africa Movie Academy Awards	Best Nigerian Film	La Femme Anjola	Nominated	
2021	Africa Movie Academy Awards	Best Sound	La Femme Anjola	Nominated	
2022	Africa Magic Viewers' Choice Awards	Best Supporting Actress	Mumbi Maina	Pending	
2022	Africa Magic Viewers' Choice Awards	Best Costume Designer	Yolanda Okereke	Pending	
2022	Africa Magic Viewers' Choice Awards	Best Make Up	Abiola Popoola	Pending	
2022	Africa Magic Viewers' Choice Awards	Best Writer	Tunde Babalola	Pending	
2022	Africa Magic Viewers' Choice Awards	Best Overall Movie	Mildred Okwo And Rita Dominic	Pending	
2022	Africa Magic Viewers' Choice Awards	Best Director	Mildred Okwo	Pending	
