= 4th Africa Movie Academy Awards =

2008 film awards ceremony

- Date: 26 April 2008
- Site: Transcorp Hilton Hotel, Abuja, Nigeria
- Hosted by: Osita Iheme & Chinedu Ikedieze; Stephanie Okereke & Ramsey Nouah
- Organized by: Africa Film Academy

Highlights
- Best Picture: Run Baby Run

The 4th Africa Movie Academy Awards ceremony was held on the 26th of April 2008 at the Transcorp Hilton Hotel, Abuja, Nigeria, to honour the best African films of 2007. The ceremony was broadcast live on Nigerian national television. The special guest of honour at the event was Hollywood actress Angela Bassett.

The nominees were announced to a large gathering of African film industry representatives, African actresses & actors on 19 March 2008 in Johannesburg, South Africa by Africa Movie Academy Awards CEO Peace Anyiam-Osigwe.

== Winners ==
=== Major awards ===
The winners of the Award Categories are listed first and highlighted in bold letters.

Best Picture	Best Director
Run Baby Run; White Waters; Across the Niger; Princess Tyra; Mission To No Where; 30 Days	Emmanuel Apea – Run Baby Run; Izu Ojukwu – White Waters; Frank Rajah Arase – Princess Tyra; Izu Ojukwu / Kingsley Ogoro – Across the Niger; Bond Emoruwa – Check Point; Teco Benson – Mission To Nowhere; Ifeanyi Onyeabor – New Jerusalem; Mildred Okwo – 30 Days
Best Actress in a leading role	Best Actor in a leading role
Kate Henshaw-Nuttal – Stronger Than Pain; Jackie Aygemang – Princess Tyra; Stella Damasus-Aboderin – Widow; Rakiya Attah – Across the Niger; Genevieve Nnaji – 30 Days / Keep My Will	Nkem Owoh – Stronger Than Pain; Van Vicker – Return of Beyonce / Princess Tyra; Kanayo O. Kanayo – Across the Niger; OC Ukeje – Check Point; Peter Badejo – White Waters; Kofi Bucknor – Run Baby Run
Best Actress in a Supporting Role	Best Actor in a Supporting Role
Joke Silva – White Waters / 30 Days; Ireti Doyle – Across the Niger; Yhama Brew – Princess Tyra; Patience Ozokwor – New Jerusalem; Bimbo Akintola – Cash Money; Uche Jombo – Keep My Will	Emeka Ossai – Check Point; Jibril Hoomsuk – White Waters; Fritz Bafour – Return of Beyonce; Chinwetalu Agu – Across the Niger; Ofia Afuluagu Mbaka – New Jerusalem
Best Upcoming Actress	Best Upcoming Actor
Uju Okeke – Mission To Nowhere; Jackie Aygemang – Princess Tyra; Yvonne Nelson – Princess Tyra	OC Ukeje & Jibril Hoomsuk – White Waters; Maleke Idowu – Check Point; Van Vicker – Return of Beyonce / Princess Tyra; Kunle Fawole – Cash Money; Krossin – New Jerusalem
Best Child Actor	Best Indigenous Film
Evelyn Addo – Run Baby Run; Fidelis Abdulrahman – White Waters	Iranse Aje (Nigeria) in Yoruba; Ipa; Hafsat; Onitemi; Tabou
Most Outstanding Actress Indigenous	Most Outstanding Actor Indigenous
Doris Simeon – Onitemi; Laide Bakare – Iranse Aje; Fathia Balogun – Ipa; Zainab Idris – Hafsah	Ayo Akinwale – Iranse Aje; Muyiwa Ademola – Iranse Aje / Ipa; Fathia Balogun – Ipa; Ali Nuhu – Hafsah
Best Effect	Best Music
Across the Niger; New Jerusalem; Iranse Aje; Ipa; Bleeding Rose	Mirror of Beauty; White Waters; Cash Money; Run baby Run; Black friday
Best Costume	Heart of Africa
Princess Tyra; Rivals; Mirror of beauty; 30 Days; New Jerusalem	Across the Niger; Checkpoint; New Jerusalem; White Waters
Best Feature Documentary	Best Short Documentary
Do You Believe in Magic? – Moondog Films; Dun-dun (the talking drum) – Ibikansale D. Kayode; Bridging the Gap – Myanda Production; A Rare Gem – Packnet Productions; Families under Attack – Myandu Films	Not My Daughter (Ghana); Operation Smile (Nigeria); Healthy Children, Wealthy Nation (Nigeria)
Best Art Direction	Best Screenplay
New Jerusalem; Rival; Across the Niger; 30 Days; Iranse Aje; Princess Tyra	Run Baby Run; Checkpoint; White Waters; Across the Niger; Mission to Nowhere; 30 Days
Best Editing	Best Sound
Divizions or Division; Run Baby Run; Across the Niger; Black Friday; Mission to Nowhere	White Waters; Mirror of Beauty; Black Friday; Across the Niger; Mission to Nowhere
Best Cinematography	Best Make-up
White Waters; Run Baby Run; Across the Niger; Princess Tyra; Mission to Nowhere; 30 Days	Princess Tyra; New Jerusalem; Mirror of Beauty; African Soldier; Across the Niger

=== Other awards ===
The winners are written first and emboldened and not all categories had winners.

==== Best Film African Diaspora ====
- Through the Fire (film)
- Bleeding Rose

==== Best Drama (Short) ====
- Kingswill – Sirrie Mange Entertainment
- Magical Blessings
- Sky line

==== Best Animation ====
- The Lunatic – Ebele Okoye

==== Best First Film by a Director ====
- Daniel Adenimokan (Special Mention)

==== Best Comedy ====
- Stronger than Pain

=== Multiple nominations ===
The following films had the highest number of nominations.

- 14 Nominations
  - Across the Niger
- 12 Nominations
  - White Water
  - Princess Tyra
- 9 Nominations
  - Run Baby Run
- 8 Nominations
  - 30 Days

=== Multiple awards ===
The following films won the most awards on the Night

- 4 awards
  - Run Baby Run
  - White Waters
- 3 Awards
  - Stronger than Pain
