= AIICO Pension Managers Limited =

Nigerian pension fund manager

- Company type: Private limited company
- Industry: Insurance
- Founded: February 2005
- Headquarters: 2 Oba Akran Avenue; Ikeja, Lagos State, Nigeria
- Area served: Nigeria
- Key people: Eguarekhide Longe (CEO)
- Services: Financial management
- Total assets: NGN:1,337,546,000 (2015)
- Website: www.aiicopension.com

AIICO Pension Managers Limited is a pension funds management company in Nigeria. It is a 65 percent owned subsidiary of AIICO Insurance, a Nigeria Stock Exchange listed insurance services provider.

On 31 December 2015, the company's total assets were NGN:1,337,546,000, with shareholders' funds of NGN:1,275,178,000. As at September 2016, the company had over 200,000 registered clients and has an excess of NGN:60 billion under management.

== History ==
AIICO Pension Managers Limited was founded in February 2005. In April 2006, the company was awarded a licence to operate as a pension funds administrator (PFA). In August 2016, to mark 10 years in business, the company appointed Nollywood actress Joke Silva as its brand ambassador, to promote the company services and products.

== See also ==
- List of banks in Nigeria
- Economy of Nigeria
