= Emmanuel Apea =

Ghanaian media director

- Education: Achimota School; University of London; Niagara College
- Occupations: TV and film director
- Notable work: Run Baby Run
- Awards: 2008 Africa Movie Academy Award for Best Director

Emmanuel Apea, Jr. is a Ghanaian television and film director, 2008 winner of the Africa Movie Academy Award for Best Director.

== Early life and education ==
Apea is the son of Reverend Emmanuel Apea Sr, a former United Nations Ambassador and Co-Ordinator to West Africa and ECOWAS, and Emma Apea, a Healthcare practitioner. He studied at Achimota School, the University of London in the United Kingdom and Niagara College in Canada.

== Career ==
Apea directed a series of popular TV serialized dramas. He was the first director of Taxi Driver in 1998, and the producer of the soap opera Home Sweet Home which began airing in 2003. Hotel St. James, set in Kumasi and in a mix of Akan and English, began airing in 2005.

His 2006 movie Run Baby Run won four Africa Movie Academy Awards which includes Best Child Actor, Best Screenplay, and Best Picture in 2008, with Apea winning the Award for Best Director. In 2009 it was the Best Narrative Feature-Programmer's Award at the 2009 Pan African Film Festival in Los Angeles. A 2010 movie, Elmina, attracted critical attention.

== Filmography ==
- Run Baby Run, 2006
- Elmina, 2010

== See also ==
- Van Vicker
