= Uju Okeke =

Nigerian actress

- Born: Obianuju Blessing Okeke; Lagos, Nigeria
- Education: Nnamdi Azikiwe University
- Occupation: Nollywood Actress
- Years active: 2004–present
- Spouse: Melekh
- Awards: Next Upcoming Actress at Africa Movie Academy Awards

Obianuju Blessing Okeke, popularly known as Uju Okeke, is an actress in Nigerian cinema. She had roles in Mission to No Where and The Barrister.

== Personal life ==
Okeke was born in Anambra State. She is a graduate in theatre arts from Nnamdi Azikiwe University.

In 2012, she married her longtime partner, Melekh. The marriage took place at Saint Barth Anglican Church in Lagos.

== Career ==
In 2006, Okeke played the role of a maid in Teco Benson thriller film Mission to Nowhere. In 2007, she won the award for the Next Upcoming Actress at the Africa Movie Academy Awards (AMAA) for her role.

== Filmography ==
Year	Film	Role	Genre	Ref.
2006	The Barrister	Nwando	Film	
2006	Crime Planner 2	Mandy	Drama	
2008	Mission to No Where	Tina	Film	
2015	Yellow Fever		Comedy	
