= Vinaya Sungkur =

Mauritian actress

- Occupation: Actress
- Known for: The Children of Troumaron

Vinaya Sungkur is a Mauritian actress, who was nominated for Africa Movie Academy Award for Best Actress in a Supporting Role for her role as "Savita" in Les enfants de Troumaron in 2014.

== Career ==
In January 2015, she was reported to be one of the hosts of The Vagina Monologues. In November 2015, she acted in Sous la Varangue, which was a comedy play based on Mauritian literature. In 2012, Sungkur starred in The Children of Traumaron, a film directed by Harrikrisna Anenden and Sharvan Anenden, which was screened at the 2013 Hamburg Film Festival. In the film, she plays "Savita", a young girl trying to survive in the city of Port-Louis. In the film, "Sadiq", "Loius", "Savita" and "Clelio" engaged in prostitution and other meaner jobs to survive, until it cost the lives of one of them. Afterwards, they decide to leave the city. The film was based on a novel by Ananda Devi. Her role earned her an Africa Movie Academy Awards nomination for best supporting actress. At the 2013 Panafrican Film and Television Festival of Ouagadougou, the film won the award for "Oumarou Ganda Award for the Best First Work".

== Personal life ==
Sungkur is an alumnus of Sorbonne Nouvelle.
