= Amstel Malta Box Office =

Nigerian TV show

Amstel Malta Box Office (AMBO) is a Nigerian reality television show launched in 2005 and sponsored by Nigerian Breweries. The show centres on the Nigerian film industry, commonly known as Nollywood and has produced actors such as Alex Okoroji, Bayray McNwizu, Annabella Zwyndila and OC Ukeje. The first edition, directed by Niji Akanni, was won by Azizat Sadiq. The show ran for five editions, with the final season in 2009 won by Ivie Okujaye.
