= Amina (2021 film) =

2021 Nigerian film

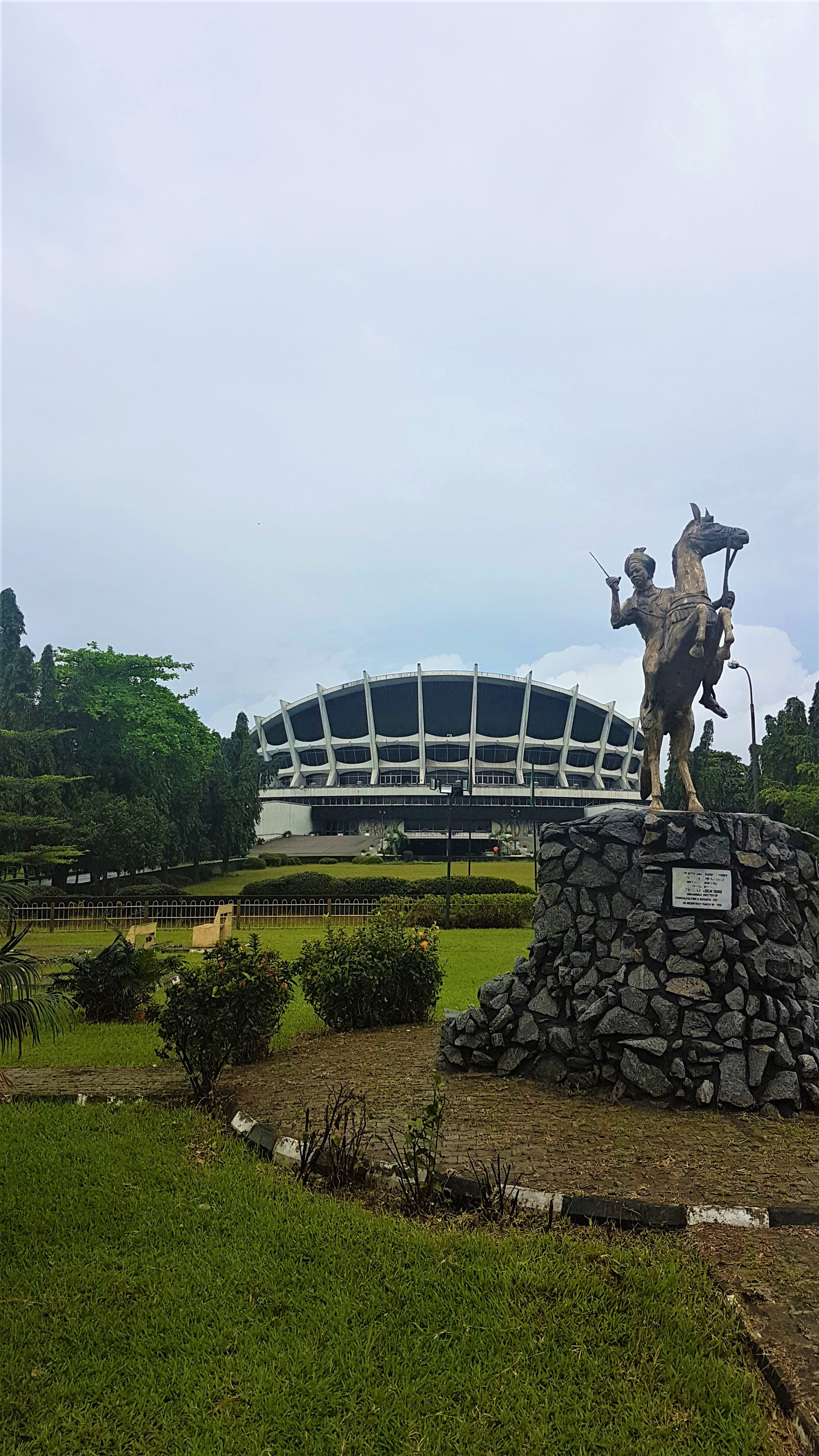
- Statue of queen Amina
- Directed by: Izu Ojukwu
- Release dates: 2021
- Running time: +105 minutes
- Country: Nigeria

Amina is a 2021 Nigerian action drama film directed by Izu Ojukwu. It is based on the story of the life of 16th century Zazzau empire warrior Queen Amina. Amina premiered on Netflix on November 4, 2021. The film got the most nominations at Africa Magic Viewers' Choice Awards, 2022.

== Plot ==
The film begins with a duel between Zazzau's champion Kabarkai and Danjuma. After witnessing the fight, a young Amina goes on to tell her father, the Emir of Zazzau (Abu Chris Gbakann) that she wants to be a warrior. This comes with resistance from Magaji Mjinyawa who advises that the Zazzau’s armies has never recruited a woman. The plot developed around events leading to Amina's ascension to the throne of Zazzau.

== Cast ==
- Lucy Ameh as Amina
- Ali Nuhu as Danjuma
- Clarion Chukwurah as Zumbura
- Paul Adubazi as Sarkin Busa
- Okonkwo David Chibuzor as Ogaga
- Jennifer Ezekiel Ade as Igala Princess
- Usman Tijani Abubakar as Ibrahim
- Victoria Nweke Ekene as Mero
- Dan Chris Ebie as Galadima
- Sani Danja as Soldier
- Lawandi Bashir Datti as Young Danjuma
- Debua Goodness as Igala Priestess
- Abu Chris Gbakann as Sarki
- Magaji Mijinyawa as Madaki
- Habiba Ummi Mohammed as Zaria
- Asabe Madaki as Aladi Ameh

== Reception ==
The film was criticised for being in Hausa and for its lead actor being non-Hausa. It has also been criticized for containing several historical inaccuracies. Ojukwu responded that the lack of sufficient archives and data for Nigeria's historical events made it difficult to produce the movie.

== Awards and nominations ==
Year	Award	Category	Recipient	Result	Ref
2022	Africa Magic Viewers' Choice Awards	Best Supporting Actress	Clarion Chukwura	Nominated	
2022	Africa Magic Viewers' Choice Awards	Best Supporting Actor	Magaji Mijinyawa	Nominated	
2022	Africa Magic Viewers' Choice Awards	Best Art Director	Tunji Afolayan	Won	
2022	Africa Magic Viewers' Choice Awards	Best Costume Designer	Millicent T. Jack	Won	
2022	Africa Magic Viewers' Choice Awards	Best Lighting Designer	Stanley Ibegbu Okechukwu	Nominated	
2022	Africa Magic Viewers' Choice Awards	Best Sound Editor	Jim Lively and James Nelson	Won	
2022	Africa Magic Viewers' Choice Awards	Best Sound Track	Dabs Agwom	Nominated	
2022	Africa Magic Viewers' Choice Awards	Best Make Up	Dagogo Diminas And Gabriel Okorie Gabazzini	Nominated	
2022	Africa Magic Viewers' Choice Awards	Best Writer	Frank Chinedu Uba	Nominated	
2022	Africa Magic Viewers' Choice Awards	Best Cinematographer	Peter Kreil, Wale Adebayo, Samuel Jonathan and Moruf Fadaro	Nominated	
2022	Africa Magic Viewers' Choice Awards	Best Movie West Africa	Okey Ogunjiofor	Nominated	
2022	Africa Magic Viewers' Choice Awards	Best Overall Movie	Izu Ojukwu And Okey Ogunjiofor	Won	
2022	Africa Magic Viewers' Choice Awards	Best Director	Izu Ojukwu	Nominated	
