= Mildred Okwo =

Nigerian film director and producer

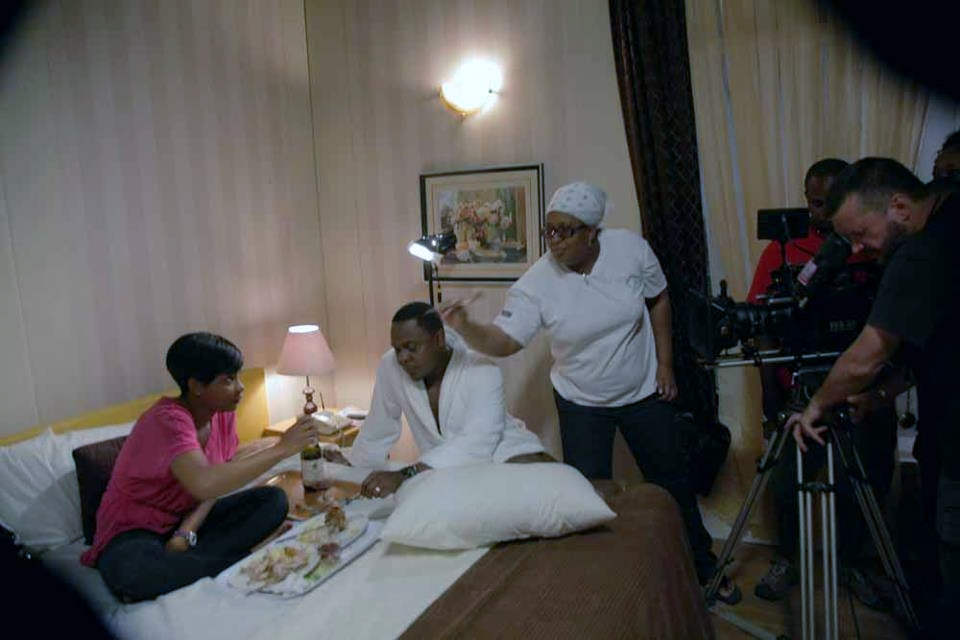
- Okwo on set of The Meeting in 2011
- Born: 29 April 1966 (age 60)
- Education: University of Benin; Orange County, California
- Occupations: producer, director
- Years active: 2006 - present
- Notable work: The Meeting

Mildred Okwo is a Nigerian film director and producer. She was nominated for the Best Director award at the 4th Africa Movie Academy Awards. In 2012, she directed the romance comedy-drama film The Meeting, which won several awards, including Nigeria Entertainment Awards, Africa Movie Academy Awards and Nollywood Movies Awards.

== Early life, education and career ==
Okwo was born on 29 April 1966 in Lagos, Nigeria. She studied theatre arts at the University of Benin, Edo State, Nigeria. She also studied law at the Whittier Law School, Orange County, California, USA.

Okwo is a Nigerian film director and producer whose films have received several nominations and awards in Africa, including the AMVCA, AMAA, NMA and "Publix du Prix" at Nollywood Paris. In 2006, after her return to Nigeria, she wrote, co-produced and directed the film 30 Days. Many popular Nigerian film actors featured in the film, including Joke Silva, Najite Dede, Genevieve Nnaji, Segun Arinze, Rita Dominic, Kate Henshaw and Norbert Young. On 30 April 2006, 30 Days was released in the US. It received 10 nominations at the 2008 Africa Movie Academy Awards, including Best Art Direction, Best Screenplay, Best Cinematography and Best Picture. In 2016, Okwo was named one of "50 Women Shaping Africa" by Elle Magazine SA and one of the 100 most influential people in Nigeria by Y'Naija.com.

== Academy Awards committee ==
Okwo, alongside eleven other Nollywood practitioners, founded the Nigerian Oscars Selection Committee (NOSC) and were approved by the Academy of Motion Picture Arts and Sciences (AMPAS) to screen Nigerian films to be submitted for the Best Foreign Language Film category at the Academy Awards.

== Filmography ==
- 30 Days (2006)
- The Meeting (2012)
- Suru L'ere (2016)
- La Femme Anjola (2019)

== Awards and nominations ==
Year	Award	Category	Work	Result	Ref
2022	Africa Magic Viewers' Choice Awards	Best Overall Movie	La Femme Anjola	Nominated	
2022	Africa Magic Viewers' Choice Awards	Best Director	La Femme Anjola	Nominated	

== See also ==
- List of Nigerian actors
- List of Nigerian film producers
- List of Nigerian film directors
