= Joke Silva =

Nigerian actress and director (born 1961)

Joke Silva MFR
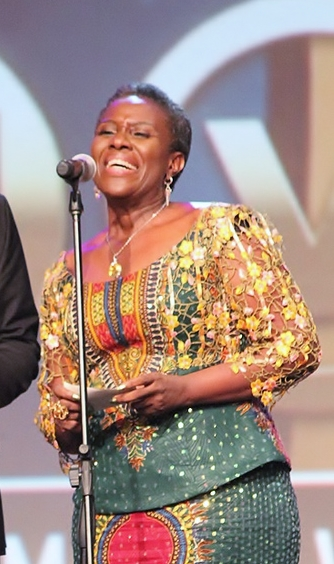
- Silva at the 2017 Africa Magic Viewers Choice Awards
- Born: 29 September 1961 (age 65); Lagos, Lagos State, Nigeria
- Other name: Joke Silva Jacobs
- Education: University of Lagos
- Occupations: Actress, director, and businesswoman
- Years active: 1990–present
- Notable work: White Waters . Women's Cot
- Spouse: Olu Jacobs (m. 1989; died 2026)
- Awards: 2006 Africa Movie Academy Award for Best Actress in a Leading Role . 2008Africa Movie Academy Award for Best Actress in a Leading Role

Joke Silva MFR is a veteran Nigerian actress, director, and businesswoman.

In 1998, she had a major role, starring opposite Colin Firth and Nia Long in the British-Canadian film The Secret Laughter of Women. In 2006, she won "Best Actress in a Leading Role" at the 2nd Africa Movie Academy Awards for her performance in Women's Cot, and "Best Actress in a Supporting Role" at the 4th Africa Movie Academy Awards in 2008 for her performance as a grandmother in White Waters.

Silva was married to veteran actor Olu Jacobs from 1989 to his death in 2026. The couple founded and operated the Lufodo Group, a media corporation that consists of film production, distribution assets, and the Lufodo Academy of Performing Arts, where she serves as Director of Studies. She is also the pioneer managing director of Malete Film Village, in association with Kwara State University.

On 29 September 2014, Silva received recognition as a Member of the Order of the Federal Republic, one of Nigeria's National Honours, at the International Conference Centre in Abuja.

== Early life ==
Silva was born in Lagos, Nigeria, into a Saro/Amaro family of four children. Her mother, the pioneering doctor Adebimbola Silva, died in July 2015. Her father, Chief Emmanuel Afolabi Silva, was a lawyer, and her great-grandfathers were the prominent Colonial Nigerians Charles Phillips and Samuel Herbert Pearse.

== Education ==
Silva attended Holy Child College in Lagos. A graduate of the University of Lagos and the Webber Douglas Academy of Dramatic Art in London, Silva began her career in film in the early 1990s. At university she was part of a cultural group that included the playwright Bode Osanyin and the singer Stella Monye. She took a year off from her studies, during which time she began working as an actress before relocating to England, where she studied drama at the Webber Douglas Academy of Dramatic Art in London. Initially, her parents were opposed to Silva's decision to go into the theatre, but they soon began to support her, happy at the success she made of her career. During a slow period of her career, Silva returned to school, studying English at the University of Lagos.

== Career ==
=== Earlier roles (1990–2004) ===
Silva has starred in numerous films and television series in both the English and Yoruba languages. One of her earliest roles was in the 1990 English television series Mind Bending. In 1993, she appeared in Owulorojo, followed by Violated in 1996. In 1998, she starred opposite Colin Firth and Nia Long in the British-Canadian film The Secret Laughter of Women, in which she portrayed Nene. Author Finola Kerrigan noted that Silva stood out as an exceptional actress in the Nigerian film industry after mentioning her role.

In 2002, Silva starred opposite Bimbo Akintola in Keeping Faith. Akintola later cited Silva, whom she refers to as "Aunty Joke", as a major career influence, adding, "Silva has done a lot, but it's not even about the things that she did, it's about the things she didn't realize that she did". Also in 2002, Silva co-produced and starred in The Kingmaker with Olu Jacobs. This was followed by roles in pictures such as A Husband's Wife (2003), Shylock (2004), and A Past Came Calling (2004).

=== Critical success (2006–present) ===
In 2006, Silva was awarded the "Best Actress in a Leading Role" award at the 2nd Africa Movie Academy Awards for her role in Women's Cot. Later that year, Silva starred opposite Genevieve Nnaji in Mildred Okwo's action thriller 30 Days, which received 10 nominations at the Africa Movie Academy Awards in 2008. She also narrated Jeta Amata's Anglo-Nigerian production The Amazing Grace, which was shot in Calabar. The film was lauded by critics and was nominated for 11 Africa Movie Academy Awards. The News noted Silva's "song-like voice, [which] provides insight to the actions".

In 2007, Silva starred opposite Kate Henshaw-Nuttal, Michael Okon, and Fred Essien in Ndubuisi Okoh's To Love and to Hold. Silva won a Best Supporting Actress award in 2008 for her "methodical portrayal of a grandmother" in White Waters (2007), though she was not at the ceremony to receive her award in person. In a November 2008 interview, Silva professed that "whenever she had to play an evil character in a film, she would pray and use Jesus as her 'hedge'". Silva is also the recipient of an EMOTAN Award from African Independent Television (AIT) and the SOLIDRA Award for Visual Art.

In 2011, Silva starred alongside Nse Ikpe Etim, Wale Ojo, and Lydia Forson in Kunle Afolayan's romantic comedy Phone Swap. Lauded by the critics, and one of the most eagerly awaited films of the year, it received four nominations at the 8th Africa Movie Academy Awards, including a nomination for Best Nigerian Film. It also won the award for Achievement in Productions Design. In 2013, Silva took to the stage to appear in the Thespian Family Theatre and Productions staging of the "Mad King of Ijudiya" at the Agip Hall of Muson Centre of Lagos at Christmas. Two shows were put up at 3:00 pm and 6:00 pm on 21, 22, 28, and 29 December, which Vanguard described as a "rich blend of folklore, traditional dance, and music that naturally transports the audience to a typical African village setting".

== United Nations Goodwill Ambassador ==
In October 2012, the United Nations Office on Drugs and Crime appointed Silva as goodwill ambassador. In accordance with the UN policy of enlisting prominent figures in art, music, film, sport, and literature to assist with their campaigns, her role was focused on her participation in the fight against human trafficking in Nigeria. Work fighting human trafficking was part of the "I Am Priceless" campaign, which had also received support from the Nigerian authorities. Silva's appointment was for a period of three years.

== Personal life ==
Silva was married to veteran actor Olu Jacobs and has two children. The couple met in 1981 at the National Theatre, Lagos during the 21st Independence anniversary.

Silva is director of studies at the Lufodo Academy of Performing Arts, while her husband served as chairman. Lufodo Academy is one of several assets the couple owns as part of the Lufodo Group, including Lufodo Productions, Lufodo Consult, and Lufodo Distribution. She has curated for the Bank of Industry (BOI) in Theatre, Film, Documentary and Poetry and the 2012 London Olympics, and is also the pioneer managing director of Malete Film Village, in association with Kwara State University.

In addition to her work as an actress, Silva is a philanthropist and a strong supporter of women's emancipation and empowerment, contributing to their education, training, and progress.

On 29 September 2014, Silva was honored as a Member of the Order of the Federal Republic, one of Nigeria's national honors, at the International Conference Centre in Abuja. In September 2016, she was unveiled as the brand ambassador for AIICO Pension Managers Limited (APML).

Silva, in the year 2020, led the campaign supporting ailing Nigerian actors soliciting funds to pay for medical bills. She did that through the instance of the Actors Guild of Nigeria, AGN, which revealed plans to inaugurate health insurance schemes for its members. In November 2021, Joke had an interview with Chude Jideonwo, where she revealed that her husband Jacobs is battling with Dementia with Lewy bodies. In 2022, she was appointed to the Tinubu/Shettima Women Presidential Campaign Team.

== Selected filmography ==
- Violated 1 (1995)
- Violated 2 (1996)
- Silent Night (1996) as Mrs. Agnes Odame
- Curse From Beyond (1999) as Janet's Mother
- The Secret Laughter of Women (1999) as Nene
- Keeping Faith: Is That Love? (2002)
- The Kingmaker (2003)
- Last Wedding (2004) as Mrs. Daniel
- Women's Cot (2005)
- 30 Days (2006) as Dupe Ajayi
- Eewo Orisa (2007) as Eyinade
- The Royal Hibiscus Hotel (2017) as Augustina
- Potato Potahto (2017) as Mrs. Wilson
- Chief Daddy (2018) as Lady Kay Beecroft
- Light in the Dark (2019) as Mama Jumoke
- Diamonds in the Sky (2019) as Aisha Dalhatu
- Two Weeks in Lagos (2019) as Mrs. Chukwuemeka
- Namaste Wahala (2021) as Shola
- The Wait (2021) as Akin's Mom
- Chief Daddy 2: Going for Broke (2022) as Lady Kay
- Elesin Oba, The King's Horseman (2022)
- Rise (2022) as Cecelia
- Over the Bridge (2023) as Engineer Suleiman
- Funmilayo Ransome-Kuti (2024) as older Funmilayo

=== Television ===
- Battleground (2017–2019) as Mama Egba
- The Olive (2021-2023) as Madam Elaine

== See also ==
- List of Yoruba people
- List of Nigerian actresses
- List of Nigerian philanthropists
