= Ifeanyi Onyeabor =

Nigerian filmmaker (1971–2019)

- Born: Ifeanyi OnyeaboIfeanyi Onyeabo; 1971
- Died: 2019 (aged 48-49)
- Other names: Big Slim, Mogul, Baba Mutum
- Occupation: Director
- Years active: 1996–2019

Ifeanyi Onyeabo (1971–2019), was a Nigerian filmmaker. He is most notable for the films My Mother’s Heart, 5 Apostles, Darkest Knight and One Good Turn.

Along with his partner Steve James, he established the production company, SIC Entertainment Production Nigeria Limited. He was awarded at African movie Academy Award (AMAA) for his movie New Jerusalem.

In July 2014, Onyeabor was remanded in Kirikiri Maximum Prisons by the Lagos High Court sitting in Ikeja over an alleged N8.8 million fraud. According to sources, he has collected a total sum of N8.8 million from Steve-James in December 2008, with the purpose of producing two movies; Young Amazon and Tribes.

Onyeabor died while filming in Jos, Plateau State, on Good Friday.

== Filmography ==
Year	Film	Role	Genre	Ref.
1999	Asimo	Director	Video film	
1999	Visitor	Director	Video film	
2000	Remember Your Mother	Director	Video film	
2000	Time	Director	Video film	
2000	Lost Hope	Director	Video film	
2001	On Holiday	Director	Video film	
2002	Kukan kurcia	Director	Video film	
2003	The Silent Book 2	Director	Video film	
2003	The Silent Book	Director	Video film	
2004	Scout	Director	Video film	
2004	Pretty Woman	Director	Video film	
2005	One Good Turn 3	Director	Video film	
2005	One Good Turn 2	Director	Video film	
2005	One Good Turn 3	Director	Video film	
2005	Never End 2	Director	Video film	
2005	Never End 2	Director	Video film	
2005	My Mother's Heart 2	Director	Video film	
2005	My Mother's Heart 2	Director	Video film	
2005	Holy Diamond 3	Director	Video film	
2005	Holy Diamond 2	Director	Video film	
2005	Holy Diamond	Director	Video film	
2005	Darkest Night 2	Director	Video film	
2005	Darkest Night 2	Director	Video film	
2005	Baby Guards 2	Director	Video film	
2005	Baby Guards	Director	Video film	
2006	Best of the Game 3	Director	Video film	
2006	Best of the Game 2	Director	Video film	
2006	Best of the Game	Director	Video film	
2006	Aguba Igogoro	Director	Video film	
2008	Lumba Boys 2	Director	Video film	
2008	Lumba Boys	Director	Video film	
2009	Peace Mission	Actor: Himself	Documentary	
2009	Apostles 3	Director	Video film	
2009	Apostles 2	Director	Video film	
2009	Apostles	Director	Video film	
