= Accident (2013 film) =

2013 Nigerian drama film

- Release poster
- Directed by: Teco Benson
- Screenplay by: Teco Benson; Tai Emeka Obasi
- Produced by: Teco Benson
- Starring: Kalu Ikeagwu; Chioma Chukwuka; Tope Osoba
- Cinematography: Abdulahi Yusuf
- Edited by: Teco Benson
- Music by: Austine Erowele
- Distributed by: TFP Global Network
- Release date: 2013
- Running time: 91 minutes
- Country: Nigeria
- Language: English

Accident is a 2013 Nigerian thriller drama film produced and directed by Teco Benson and starring Kalu Ikeagwu and Chioma Chukwuka.

== Awards and nominations ==
Accident won the Best Nigerian Film award at the 10th Africa Movie Academy Awards. It also has 3 nominations at the 2014 Nigeria Entertainment Awards.

Another award in honor of "Accident" was the nomination of one of the actresses - Chioma, as the “Best Actress” for the African Movie Academy Award in 2014.

== Plot summary ==
The story revolves around the life of a female lawyer who is approached by a client seeking divorce with low-sexual satisfaction from partner as reason. An unexpected event occurs leading to several consequences.

== Cast ==
- Chioma Chukwuka as Chy
- Kalu Ikeagwu as Don
- Frederick Leonard as Chike
- Wale Macaulay as Pros Counsel
- Cassandra Odita as Angela's mum
- Bukky Babalola as Ada
- Eric Anderson as Inspector Mark
- Uzor Ngoladi as Driver
- George Davidson
- Tope Osoba as Mabel
- William Wise as Peter

== See also ==
- List of Nigerian films of 2013
