= Potato Potahto =

2017 Ghanaian-Nigerian romantic comedy film

- Directed by: Shirley Frimpong-Manso
- Written by: Shirley Frimpong-Manso
- Produced by: Shirley Frimpong-Manso, Sarah Inya Lawal, Ken Attoh
- Starring: OC Ukeje; Joselyn Dumas; Joke Silva; Kemi Lala Akindoju; Chris Attoh; Blossom Chukwujekwu
- Production companies: 19 April Entertainment, Ascend Studios, Lufodo Productions
- Release date: 21 November 2017 (Nigeria)
- Running time: 115 minutes
- Countries: Nigeria; Ghana
- Language: English
- Budget: $500,000

Potato Potahto is a 2017 Ghanaian-Nigerian romantic comedy film directed and written by Shirley Frimpong-Manso, which tells the story of a divorce and how complicated it can be within West African society. It stars Joselyn Dumas, Chris Attoh, Joke Silva, OC Ukeje and others.

== Plot ==
Potato Potahto chronicles the chaotic events that unfold when a divorced couple continues to live together in their matrimonial home, each hiring a young, attractive helper of the opposite sex.

== Cast ==
- Joselyn Dumas as Lulu Wilson
- Chris Attoh as Gabby
- Adjetey Anang as Ato Brown
- Nikki Samonas as Marian
- Victoria Michaels as Clarissa
- Blossom Chukwujekwu as Fred
- Kemi Lala Akindoju as Frances
- Joke Silva as Mrs. Wilson
- OC Ukeje as Tony Gyampo
- Bill Davies as Mr. Quartey
- Dinah Semevor as Mrs. Wilson's friend

== Production ==
The film is a co-production of Nigerian companies Ascend Studios, 19 April Entertainment, Virgo Sun Ltd, and Lufodo Productions, and was directed by Ghanaian filmmaker Shirley Frimpong-Manso. The film was shot over the span of two weeks, with collaborative efforts from Swedish, French, British, Nigerian, and Ghanaian film producers.

== Release ==
Potato Potahto premiered at the IMAX cinema in Lekki on 16 November 2017 and was released in Nigeria on 21 November 2017.

== Reception ==
Potato Potahto was well received by the public, owing to Shirley Frimpong-Manso's earlier successes. The film was rated 7.9 by users on Nollywood Reinvented. Potato Potahto has been screened at the Cannes Film Festival, Durban International Film Festival, and the British Urban Film Festival. It was also featured as part of the official selection for the Film Africa Festival, held from 27 October to 5 November. In December 2019, Potato Potahto was officially added to Netflix’s catalog of films.

== Accolades ==
Complete list of awards
Award	Category	Recipients and nominees	Result	Ref
Toronto International Nollywood Film Festival (TINFF)	Best Feature Film (Nollywood)	Potato Potahto	Won	
Toronto International Nollywood Film Festival (TINFF)	Best Costume	Potato Potahto	Won	
Toronto International Nollywood Film Festival (TINFF)	Special Jury Awards for Best Actor	OC Ukeje	Won	
Toronto International Nollywood Film Festival (TINFF)	Best Actor in a Supporting Role (English)	Chris Attoh	Nominated	
Toronto International Nollywood Film Festival (TINFF)	Best Actress	Joselyn Dumas	Won	
Africa Magic Viewers’ Choice Awards	Best Actor in a Comedy	OC Ukeje	Nominated	
Africa Magic Viewers’ Choice Awards	Best Cinematography	Kwame Amuah	Nominated	
Africa Magic Viewers’ Choice Awards	Best Movie West Africa	Potato Potahto	Nominated	
Africa Magic Viewers’ Choice Awards	Best Director	Shirley Frimpong-Manso	Nominated	
Africa Magic Viewers’ Choice Awards	Best Overall Movie	Potato Potahto	Nominated	
Africa Magic Viewers’ Choice Awards	Best Costume Designer Movie or TV Series	Christie Brown	Nominated	
Africa Movie Academy Award	Best Actress in a Supporting Role	Joke Silva	Won	
