= The Delivery Boy =

2018 thriller film

- The Delivery Boy Poster
- Directed by: Adekunle Adejuyigbe
- Written by: Adekunle Adejuyigbe
- Screenplay by: Adekunle Adejuyigbe
- Story by: Adekunle Adejuyigbe
- Starring: Jammal Ibrahim; Jemima Osunde; Charles Etubiebi; Jude Chukwuka; Chris Iheuwa; Kehinde Fasuyi; Abiodun Falana; Muyiwa Ayoola; Aina Oladeji; Master Adebulugbe; Adeleke Ezekiel; Mahin Nosa Itotoi; Mary-Ann Eziekwe; Taiwo Osaye; Sodiq Adebayo
- Cinematography: Nodash
- Edited by: Nodash for The Post Office
- Music by: Michael 'Truth' Ogunlade
- Production company: Something Unusual Studios
- Distributed by: Silverbird Distributions
- Release date: May 2018 (France)
- Running time: 66 minutes
- Country: Nigeria
- Languages: Hausa, Pidgin, English

The Delivery Boy is a thriller written and directed by Adekunle Adejuyigbe, a Nigerian film maker. The film stars Jammal Ibrahim, Jemima Osunde, Charles Etubiebi, Kehinde Fasuyi and a host of others. The Delivery Boy screened at film festivals including African Film Festival New York, Lights, Camera, Africa, Nollywood Week Paris, the Africa International Film Festival (AFRIFF), Lake International PanAfrican Film Festival, Real Time International Film festival (RTF), and the 9th Jagran Film Festival. It has won awards such as "The Best Nigerian Film Award" at the Africa International Film Festival and "Best Supporting Actor" at the Real Time International Film Festival (RTF) since its release in 2018.

The film was shot by The Elite Film Team, produced by Something Unusual Studios and distributed by Silverbird Distributions in Nigeria.

== Plot summary ==
After the opening credits, two men are sitting together in a small room. One of them (Jammal Ibrahim) is staring out the window. The other (Charles Etubiebi) is eating something and making conversation, which the first man participates in sparsely. The men hear the call to prayer ring out, and so they pray in the next room. During prayer, the second man starts to shake and announces he has been poisoned to the first man, who he calls Amir. When Amir refuses to retrieve the first aid kit, the first man realizes that Amir poisoned him.

In the cabinet with the first-aid kit is a journal, which Amir and the second man fight over the key for. The second man locks the cabinet and swallows the key to the cabinet before passing out, which frustrates Amir. He goes to a barrel and pulls out a suicide bomber vest, which he then straps to himself. Amir leaves the building.

The camera cuts to a car on a city road, where a man makes use of the services of a sex worker (Jemima Osunde). After he's done, the man throws some money at the sex worker, and she walks into the nearby St. Luke's Hospital. There is a donation box on the receptionist's (Aina Oladeji) desk to “save Chidi’s life,” and it's indicated on the box that only a small portion of the needed funds have been donated. The woman donates 1,000 Nigerian Naira (placing the movie definitively in Nigeria) and updates the sign. A large amount of swelling on the right side of the sex worker's face is revealed by the camera, and she rejects the receptionist's offer to see “him,” Chidi, who she just donated to save.

The camera cuts to Amir, who walks down a city road, reads a piece of paper he's holding, and then hides under a truck. Amir gets a phone call, initiating a flashback where a much younger Amir (Master Adebulugbe), in his childhood, is hearing a ringtone in the room. Young Amir grabs a piece of paper and quickly hides it in his hand before a man (Jude Chukwuka) comes in the room to pick up the phone. The man, who is named by the caller as Mallam Sadan, is speaking with a woman he calls Sister Dorcas (Kehinde Fasuyi), who tells him “the papers are ready.” Mallam Sadan requests that she “take them to Ofili at the new house,” but cannot find the address for "the new house" written down anywhere because the paper with the address on it is in Amir's hand. Mallam Sadan says Ofili will send the address to Sister Dorcas. Mallam calls for Amir, who says his name is Joseph. Mallam says that his name in his new family is Amir, and that Amir and Mallam are “father and son now.” Mallam embraces Amir and the flashback ends.

A car pulls up next to the truck where Amir is hiding. The driver (Chris Iheuwa) is complaining that the gate to the building he's arrived at is closed. Amir runs up to the car and holds a knife to the driver's throat, who panics but holds still. Amir demands to know where Mallam Sadan is. The driver argues, and so Amir stabs him in the leg. The driver says he doesn't know and that he only handles “minor logistics.” The driver advises Amir to speak to Sister Dorcas, for she might know.

Another man (Abiodun Falana), who the driver calls Sule, comes out of the building, but Amir threatens to kill Sule if he comes closer to Amir and the driver. Sule returns inside, which makes the driver sob harder. Amir demands Sister Dorcas’ address from the driver. Once Amir has the address, the driver uses his possession of a vehicle to offer to take Amir to Sister Dorcas’ house, bargaining for his life. In another part of the city, some sex workers, including the one from earlier, are patrolling the red light district of the city. She's not getting any customers, which makes her feel sad. Finally, after a lot of waiting, she gets a customer. The customer negotiates her down from her offer of 6,000 Naira to 1,000. The customer refuses to pay her at all, so she hits him with a crowbar and takes all his money, then runs away.

The driver is taking Amir down a dark road, and begging to go to the hospital, for he is losing a lot of blood. The driver passes out from loss of blood, and crashes the car. Nearby passersby notice this. Amir checks the driver for a pulse, stabs the driver, and then runs away. The passersby collectively decide to chase after Amir because they saw him stab the driver. The sex worker's customer is chasing her to get back the money she took from him. Amir and the sex worker both hide in the same small, open carriage.

They look at each other quietly for a while. The sex worker introduces herself as Nkem. Amir introduces himself. Amir asks if she knows the address he extorted from the driver. Nkem asks “what’s in it for me?” and Amir offers her cash. Nkem says she must change her clothes from her sex work outfit before they go to the address. Amir doesn't tell her what the address is for.

Back in the house where the film started, the man Amir poisoned is conscious and calls Mallam Sadan. He reports Amir gone from the building, and reveals to Mallam that the poison Amir slipped him was only a sedative, not lethal. Mallam infers that Amir “lost his nerve.” Mallam insists the operation go forward as planned, and says “the package” must be delivered by tomorrow morning. Mallam says he will send another delivery boy to get the package. However, the man alerts him that Amir has taken the package with him. At this point, it becomes clear that “the package” refers to Amir's suicide bomber vest.

Amir and Nkem arrive at Nkem's house. Amir scolds Nkem for undressing in front of him, calling her “shameless woman” in Hausa. Nkem responds, revealing that she understands Hausa. While Amir is shifting his clothes around, Nkem spots his suicide bomber vest. She says she's not sure why she's not afraid, now that she knows he is a suicide bomber, and that she's paid to take him to the address given to her. She does not plan on interfering with his business once he arrives.

Back in the house where Amir sedated a man, that same man receives a phone call from Mallam, who informs the man that “Amir killed our town scout,” presumably the driver that Amir stabbed. The man has a flashback to the fight that took place after Amir considered stealing the journal from the cabinet. The man specifies to Mallam that the aforementioned journal contains the address to every hideout in town. Mallam is confident that Amir is not a threat, but the man is wary. Mallam insists that they resolve the issue themselves. Mallam claims to “have a good idea where Amir is going next.” The call ends.

Amir and Nkem are sitting in a taxi driven by a quiet man (Muyiwa Ayoola). Amir is getting impatient. Nkem tells him, “patience is a virtue.” Amir retorts, “what does a whore know about virtue?” which upsets Nkem. She tells Amir she doesn't have a choice in her career. She says her brother (presumably Chidi, who she donated to previously) is in the hospital dying, and the operation costs 5 million naira. She asks Amir where else she can get that amount of money.

Amir points at someone selling recharge cards on the side of the road, pointing out that they are turning a profit without prostituting themselves. Nkem says she can't make 5 million quickly enough that way. Amir asks if she's made 5 million prostituting herself, implying that her current method isn't working anyway. Amir says Nkem's brother, Chidi, should take care of himself. Nkem protests that Chidi is only 13, but Amir says he could handle himself at the age of 11.

Nkem reveals that Chidi came home early from school to find his uncle having sex with Nkem, and tried to defend Nkem, but Chidi's uncle pushed Chidi down the stairs and cracked his skull. Nkem adds that her uncle only paid Chidi's school fees because Nkem agreed to have sex with him, and that the uncle had been touching her ever since the age of eight. Amir says she should’ve stopped the uncle as soon as she knew he was doing something wrong. Nkem said she tried to stop him because she was on her period and he burnt her face with a waffle iron, causing her disfigured face. Nkem asks, rhetorically, how she could’ve stopped her uncle. Nkem adds that if Chidi dies, everything she's endured to support Chidi will have been a waste. Amir ends the conversation by saying that by whoring herself out, Nkem is already dead.

Nkem and Amir have arrived at their destination, and are already out of the car. Amir pays Nkem for helping him. Nkem asks if Amir knows the residents, but he refuses to answer. Amir walks up to the building marked Little Saints Chapel and Orphanage. Amir carries a red satchel. He knocks on the metal door outside. The man who answers the door instructs Amir to wait inside the chapel while he goes to find Sister Dorcas and alert her to Amir's presence.

Sister Dorcas enters the orphanage. She is an older, short woman. She's very excited to see Amir, who she recognizes as both Joseph and Amir. The man who permitted Amir to enter sneaks up behind him, preparing to stab him with a large machete. Sister Dorcas signals for the man to proceed in attacking Amir, but Amir snatches the machete from its sheath and cleaves the man's head open. Amir asks Sister Dorcas how she knew him as Amir, since that name was only given to him after he left her orphanage as a young boy. Amir figures out that Mallam and Sister Dorcas are working together. Sister Dorcas shoots Amir with a small firearm she had hidden in her baggy robes. Sister Dorcas expresses sadness at having to shoot “one of my own children.” Sister Dorcas accuses Amir of ungratefulness towards Mallam. Sister Dorcas tells Amir she works with Mallam to earn the money necessary to feed all the orphanage's young residents. Amir tells Sister Dorcas that Mallam's organization turned him into an outcast. Sister Dorcas says that was Amir's mother's doing, for giving Amir to the orphanage in the first place. While Sister Dorcas is talking about why she must kill Amir, he snatches her pistol to the side and stabs her suddenly. Amir collapses flat on the ground, not moving.

Nkem enters the chapel. She takes Amir's satchel and looks inside. It contains a lot of money. The man that Amir sedated arrives outside the orphanage on a motorbike, just as Nkem is slowly, painstakingly assisting Amir out of the building. The man calls Mallam to update him. Mallam instructs the man to follow them, ensure they are alone, and then kill them.

Nkem says she is taking Amir to the only healthcare worker she knows, because they can't take Amir to the hospital. He would get in trouble for his suicide bomber vest. Nkem clarifies that the healthcare worker she has in mind is an abortion specialist. Nkem and Amir stop outside the abortion doctor's house, and Nkem tells Amir to remove “that thing under your clothes,” the suicide bomber vest. Nkem finds a map in Amir's satchel with the location of the hospital where Chidi is being treated marked on it. Amir passes out from blood loss.

Amir wakes up inside the building, shirtless, without his suicide bomber vest, with an IV drip in his arm. The abortion doctor (Mahin Nosa Itotoi), a middle aged woman, is watching television and laughing in the next room, with Nkem who is much more concerned about whether Amir will survive. The two rooms are separated by a curtain. The abortion doctor has figured out that Amir is planning on committing a crime but does not care because she believes she will be paid in full. Amir enters the same room as Nkem and the doctor, and the doctor leads him back to the bed where he woke up. The doctor introduces herself as “Matron Dora of the Matron Dora Specialist Hospital.”

The man that Amir sedated is outside Matron Dora's house. He calls Mallam and informs him that Amir and Nkem have been inside the building the man is outside of for a while now. The man suggests they try to reason with Amir, but Mallam says to kill Amir on sight. The man points out that Amir could have killed him but did not. Mallam says Amir might still kill the man if given the chance. The man says he will obey Mallam's orders. Amir tries to leave Matron Dora's house but she tells him that will break the stitches and she will charge double money from Nkem, who tells Amir she wants to have a conversation before he leaves to do his business.

Nkem demands privacy from Matron Dora and then asks him if he was ordered to bomb St. Luke's Hospital, informing him desperately that Chidi is recovering from his injuries there. Amir tells her he does not plan on following through on his orders, although his orders were, in fact, to bomb St. Luke's Hospital. Nkem is relieved. Amir informs her that Mallam has probably already sent another “delivery boy” to bomb the hospital. Nkem says Amir must kill Mallam. Amir shushes Nkem, suspicious that Matron Dora has been quiet for a while. Nkem insists Matron Dora is just asleep, and enters the next room. Matron Dora appears to be asleep on the couch from Nkem's perspective but she soon realizes that Matron Dora is dead. Her throat has been cut wide open. The man who was ordered to kill Amir is hiding right behind Nkem, ready to stab her in the back. Amir hears the man move, and darts into the next room to grab Nkem and pull into the room with the hospital bed, saving her life. The man enters that room, and the three begin to fight. Nkem tries to hit the man but he slices at her with the knife and shoves her to the ground. Nkem falls and stops moving. Right before the man tries to stab Amir, he calls the man Kazeem. The man, Kazeem, doesn't listen and tries to stab Amir. Instead, Amir stabs Kazeem with a knife he finds in the room. Amir starts to reason with Kazeem. Amir points out, as Kazeem did, that Amir could have killed Kazeem and decided not to. Amir reveals his goal is to kill Mallam Sadan. Kazeem asks why Mallam, who serves God, is Amir's enemy. Amir says Mallam does not serve God, only himself and calls Mallam “filthy.” Amir points out that Mallam told his child followers everything they know about the Qur’an and their religion. Mallam calls Kazeem, but Kazeem doesn't pick up. Amir implies Mallam has distorted Islam to fit his purposes and says that Malik was one of Mallam's victims. Amir regrets having reported Malik for what was supposedly lies. The phone is still ringing. Kazeem picks up the phone and lies to Mallam that he has killed Amir. Kazeem tells Amir to “disappear.” Kazeem says he is going to meet Mallam and some other followers at a mosque on Fatai Street. Amir advises Kazeem to go home instead, implying that Amir plans to bomb the mosque.

Amir wakes Nkem up and tells her he plans to kill Mallam, which makes her grateful so she hugs Amir. However, Amir recoils, which confuses Nkem. She asks if he's ever been “intimate.” He says he's been intimate before, but not with a woman. When Amir was adopted from the orphanage, Amir says the man who arranged his adoption was called Ofili. Amir flashes back to threatening the driver who Amir later stabbed, implying that Ofili is that driver. Amir, in the present, says that Ofili took him to meet his new father, Mallam Sadan. Amir flashes back to the same scene from earlier wherein Amir called himself Joseph and Mallam spoke with Sister Dorcas. Amir confirms that Mallam is his father according to the adoption papers, “but we did things that a father and son should never do!” going on to say that he too was sexually abused, but by Mallam instead. The sexual abuse continued throughout the entire weekend. Amir doesn't think of it as abuse, though, because Mallam treated him with affection. Mallam then sent him to a religious camp to be indoctrinated, where Amir met Malik. Once Amir and Malik formed a friendship, Malik opened up to Amir about being sexually abused by Mallam as well. This implies that Malik's “lies” mentioned earlier, that Amir reported, were Malik's stories of sexual abuse at the hands of Mallam. Amir became jealous, because Amir perceived the abuse as an expression of love, and Amir thought Mallam had loved only him.

Amir tells Nkem when and where he plans to kill Mallam. Nkem gives Amir the suicide bomber vest. Amir clarifies that the man he fought was not Malik, and that Malik had come from a different orphanage. Amir confesses that his reporting Malik's “lies” about abuse led to Malik being stoned by Amir and the other child followers.

Nkem gently tells Amir he was never special to Mallam. She explains that Amir was manipulated via shame and need for affection. Amir covers himself, including his face, with a robe so Mallam can't see him. Before leaving the building, he gives Nkem enough money to pay for Chidi's surgeries, which makes her cry. Amir passes out again, which makes Nkem cry harder.

When Amir regains consciousness, he finds a letter from Nkem. She has taken the suicide bomber vest and left all the money that Amir gave her. She also took the white robe that Amir planned to use to cover the vest. The letter makes it clear that Nkem plans to sacrifice herself, and she asks Amir to save Chidi and Amir himself. The camera cuts between Amir reading the letter and Nkem walking up to Mallam, where she detonates the vest. Mallam stands still until the vest detonates, meaning he most certainly dies in the explosion. Amir falls as a result of the blast's shockwave. He stands up and looks out the window.

Credits roll briefly.

In a mid-credits scene, an unidentified man calls St. Luke's Hospital and confirms he is speaking with the hospital's proprietor. The man identifies himself as Chidi's uncle and says that the operation's cost, 5 million Naira, was too high. Chidi's uncle demands that the hospital give him a partial refund of the cost of the operation. The doctor refuses and the call ends. Somebody knocks on the door, and Chidi's uncle opens the door. Outside it stands Amir, who makes direct, sinister eye contact with Chidi's uncle.

Credits roll.

== Cast ==
- Jammal Ibrahim as Amir
- Jemima Osunde as Nkem
- Charles Etubiebi as Kazeem
- Jude Chukwuka as Mallam Sadan
- Chris Iheuwa as Ofili
- Kehinde Fasuyi as Sister Dorcas
- Muyiwa Ayoola as the Cabman
- Aina Oladeji as the Nurse (Hospital Receptionist)
- Master Adebulugbe as Young Amir
- Abiodun Falana as Sule
- Adeleke Ezekiel as Bus Driver
- Mahin Nosa Itotoi as Matron Dora
- Mary-Ann Eziekwe
- Taiwo Osaye
- Sodiq Adebayo
- Wale Rahaman as Call-Girl Scene Extras
- Segun Adekoya
- Idris Shokanbi as Accident Scene Extras
- Busayo Isiola Seinde as Mosque Scene Extras

== Critical response ==
The movie got positive reviews from critics;

- It was described as one of the best-written scripts ever to hit Nigerian screens
- The Delivery Boy and the tipping point for Nollywood and Nigerian films
- The Delivery Boy is a future Nollywood classic
- The Delivery Boy named best Nigerian film at AFRIFF 2018
- "The Delivery Boy is a masterpiece"

=== Awards and nominations ===
Year	Award	Category	Result	Ref
2019	African Movie Academy Awards	Best Screenplay	Nominated	
2019	African Movie Academy Awards	Best Nigerian Film	Nominated	
2019	African Movie Academy Awards	Best Director - Adekunle Adejuyigbe	Nominated	
2019	African Movie Academy Awards	Best Film	Nominated	
