= Charles Kofi Bucknor =

Ghanaian actor (1953–2017)

- Born: 1953; Ghana
- Died: 23 May 2017 (aged 63–64)
- Occupation: Actor
- Known for: Heritage Africa; African Timber; Run baby Run

Kofi Bucknor (1953 – 23 May 2017) was a Ghanaian actor who starred in films like Heritage Africa (1989), African Timber (1989), and Run Baby Run (2006). He died on 23 May 2017 at the 37 Military Hospital; the cause of his death was unknown.

== Selected filmography ==
- Heritage Africa (1989)
- African Timber (1989)
- No Time to Die (2006) as Owusu
- Run Baby Run (2007) as Top Dog
- Elmina (2010)
- Cartel the Genesis (2015)
- Silver Rain (2015) as Mr. Timothy
- Shampaign (2016-2018 TV Series)
