= Michael Mathews =

South African cricketer

Personal information
- Full name: Michael John Anderson Mathews
- Born: 6 January 1934 (age 92); Durban, Natal, South Africa
- Batting: Right-handed
- Bowling: Leg break

Domestic team information
- Years: Team
- 1957: Oxford University

Career statistics
Competition	First-class
Matches	2
Runs scored	9
Batting average	2.25
100s/50s	–/–
Top score	5
Balls bowled	168
Wickets	6
Bowling average	12.83
5 wickets in innings	1
10 wickets in match	–
Best bowling	5/58
Catches/stumpings	1/–
- Source: Cricinfo, 10 June 2020

Michael John Anderson Mathews (born 6 January 1934) is a South African former first-class cricketer.

Mathews was born at Durban in January 1964. He later studied in England at Lincoln College at the University of Oxford. While studying at Oxford, he made two appearances in first-class cricket for Oxford University in 1957 against the Free Foresters at Oxford and Surrey at Guildford. He took 6 wickets in his two matches, with five of those wickets coming in a single innings in the match against the Free Foresters.
