= Tango with Me =

2010 film by Mahmood Ali-Balogun

- Theatrical release poster
- Directed by: Mahmood Ali-Balogun
- Written by: Femi Kayode
- Produced by: Mahmood Ali-Balogun
- Starring: Genevieve Nnaji; Joke Silva; Joseph Benjamin; Bimbo Manuel; Tina Mba; Bimbo Akintola
- Cinematography: Keith Holland
- Music by: Kayode Ilelaboye
- Production companies: Brickwall Communications LTD; Jungle FilmWorks
- Distributed by: Brickwall Communications LTD; Talking Drum Entertainment
- Release dates: May 2010 (Cannes); April 17, 2011 (Nigeria)
- Running time: 103 min
- Country: Nigeria
- Language: English
- Budget: ₦100 million

Tango with Me is a 2010 Nigerian romantic drama film written by Femi Kayode, produced and directed by Mahmood Ali-Balogun and starring Genevieve Nnaji, Joseph Benjamin and Joke Silva. The film was nominated for 5 awards at the 7th Africa Movie Academy Awards.

== Cast ==
- Genevieve Nnaji as Lola
- Joke Silva as Lola's mum
- Joseph Benjamin as Uzo
- Tina Mba as Mrs. Jibike Bankole-Smith
- Bimbo Manuel as Counsellor
- Ahmed Yerima as Lola's Father
- Bimbo Akintola as Sandra
- Queen Ahune as Lola's Friend
- Barbara Soky as Uzo's Mother
- Alex Usifo as Uzo's Father
- Kelvin Ushi as Tunde
- Matthew Onwochei as Priest
- Arinze Okonkwo as Groomsman
- Fehintola Olulana as Nkiru
- Sunday Afolabi as Assassin 1
- Emeka Ojukwu as Assassin 2
- Sade Alder-Hayes as Folake

== Reception ==
The film received positive to mixed reviews from critics. NollywoodForever gave it 80% and wrote "Tango with Me is beautifully shot with a soundtrack to complement. Joseph and Genny look good together and have an easy chemistry. I did find it somewhat slow in parts, but the performances were passionate and heartfelt".

== See also ==
- List of Nigerian films of 2010
