= Run Baby Run (2006 film) =

- Directed by: Emmanuel Apea
- Screenplay by: John Apea
- Starring: John Apea; Evelyn Addo; Fred Johnson; Collins Agyeman Sarpong; Kofi Bucknor
- Release date: February 9, 2006 (Ghana)
- Running time: 128 min
- Country: Ghana
- Language: English

Run Baby Run is a Ghanaian action film directed by Emmanuel Apea and starring John Apea. The film received 8 nominations and won 4 awards at the Africa Movie Academy Awards in 2008, including the awards for Best Picture, Best Director and Best Screenplay.

== Plot ==
Enoch Sarpong Jr., a Ghanaian student living in the UK, is visited by his little sister from Ghana, who had mistakenly picked up the wrong suitcase at the airport. The suitcase contains a huge amount of cocaine. Enoch decides to sell the drugs, however, the real owners of the drugs soon meet up with him, chasing him all across the UK and Ghana.

== Cast ==
- John Apea - Enoch Sarpong Jr.
- Evelyn Addo - Nina Sarpong
- Fred Johnson - Gator
- Collins Agyeman Sarpong - Cephas
- Kofi Bucknor - Topp Dogg
- Kojo Dadson - Enoch Sarpong Snr
- Canelle Hoppe - Naila
- Nicola Preece - Heather
- Ernest Grant - Taxi Driver
- Efe Ideh - Sparkie
- Fred Joho - Wemba
