= The Amazing Grace =

2006 British-Nigerian historical drama film

- Directed by: Jeta Amata
- Written by: Jeta Amata; Nick Moran; Scott Cleverdon
- Screenplay by: Jeta Amata
- Produced by: Jeta Amata; Alicia Arce
- Starring: Nick Moran; Joke Silva; Scott Cleverdon; Mbong Odungide; Fred Amata; Zack Amata
- Narrated by: Joke Silva
- Cinematography: Joe Taylor
- Edited by: Brian Hovmand
- Music by: Sammie Okposo
- Production company: Jeta Amata Concepts
- Release dates: 1 June 2006 (Nigeria); 9 May 2007 (UK)
- Running time: 100 min
- Countries: Nigeria; United Kingdom
- Budget: £400,000 (estimated)

The Amazing Grace is a 2006 British Nigerian historical drama film written by Jeta Amata and Nick Moran, directed by Jeta Amata and produced by Jeta Amata & Alicia Arce. The film stars Joke Silva, Nick Moran, Scott Cleverdon, Mbong Odungide, Fred Amata and Zack Amata. The film received 11 nominations and won the award for Achievement in Cinematography at the Africa Movie Academy Awards in 2007.

== Premise ==
The film, occasionally narrated by Joke Silva, tells the reformation story of British slave trader John Newton (Nick Moran), sailing to what is now Nigeria to buy slaves. Later, increasingly shocked by the brutality of slavery, he gives up the trade and becomes an Anglican priest. Newton later writes the redemptive hymn Amazing Grace and becomes an abolitionist.

== Cast ==
- Nick Moran as John Newton
- Joke Silva as Maria Davies
- Scott Cleverdon as Oliver
- Mbong Odungide as Ansa
- Fred Amata as Etim
- Zack Amata as Village Priest
- Itam Efa Williamson as Orok
- James Hicks as Simmons
- Ita Bassey as Chief
- Nick Goff as Rupert

== See also ==
- List of Nigerian films of 2006
