= Gugu and Andile =

UGugu no Andile
- Release Poster
- Directed by: Minky Schlesinger
- Written by: Lodi Matsetela
- Produced by: Bridget Pickering
- Starring: Daphney Hlomuka; Neil McCarthy; Litha Booi; Lungelo Dhladhla; Jabulani Hadebe (Sjava); Harriet Lenabe
- Cinematography: Greg Heimann
- Edited by: Catherine Meyburgh
- Music by: Warrick Sony
- Production companies: Lunar Films, Fireworks Media
- Release date: 2008
- Running time: 96 minutes
- Country: South Africa
- Languages: Zulu, Xhosa
- Budget: 3,500,000 ZAR (estimated)

UGugu no Andile is a 2008 South African drama film directed by Minky Schlesinger, and starring Daphney Hlomuka, Neil McCarthy & Lungelo Dhladhla. The film received 10 nominations and won 3 awards at the 2009 Africa Movie Academy Awards, including the awards for Best film in an African language, Most Promising Actor and Most Promising Actress. It was also a competitor in the Best TV Feature category at the 2009 FESPACO film festival in Burkina Faso, the oldest and largest film festival on the African Continent.

The story is set in South Africa in 1993, during the upheaval in the struggle for democracy. A sixteen-year-old Zulu girl Gugu is in love with a Xhosa boy Andile, against the wishes of their respective communities.

== Cast ==
- Daphney Hlomuka – Ma'Lizzie
- Neil McCarthy – Father John
- Litha Booi – Andile Mcilongo
- Lungelo Dhladhla – Gugu Dlamini
- Jabulani Hadebe – Mandla Dlamini
- Harriet Lenabe – Busi Dlamini
- Mac Mathunjwa – Bishop Mbengashe
- Thandy Matlaila – Patricia
