= Ayanda =

- Directed by: Sara Blecher
- Written by: Trish Malone
- Produced by: Terry Pheto; Busi Sizani; Robbie Thorpe
- Starring: Fulu Mugovhani; OC Ukeje; Nthati Moshesh
- Cinematography: Jonathan Kovel
- Edited by: Nicholas Costaras
- Music by: Tiago Correia-Paulo
- Distributed by: ARRAY
- Release date: June 13, 2015 (Los Angeles Film Festival)
- Running time: 105 minutes
- Country: South Africa
- Language: English

Ayanda is a 2015 South African film directed by Sara Blecher and starring Fulu Mugovhani, OC Ukeje, and Nthati Moshesh. The festival title of the film was Ayanda and the Mechanic. The film was picked up for a November 2015 release by independent film distribution company ARRAY. The film received positive reviews.

== Plot ==
A photographer captures photos and stories of Africans in Yeoville, South Africa, centered largely around Ayanda, a young designer working out of her late father's garage. When Ayanda's mother and her mother's best friend disclose a need to sell the garage, Ayanda, not willing to let go of her father's memory, undertakes a scheme to refurbish old cars to save the business with the help of two loyal mechanics. The film explores the strain Ayanda's endeavor causes within her group of family and friends pitting her obsessive desire to retain everything of her father's against their attempts to move on.

== Reception ==
The film received generally positive reviews upon release.

It won a Special Jury citation at the 2015 Los Angeles Film Festival.

== See also ==
- List of black films of the 2010s
