= 30 Days (2006 film) =

2006 Nigerian thriller film

- Directed by: Mildred Okwo
- Written by: Mildred Okwo
- Produced by: C. Chike Amobi; Ego Boyo; Toyin Dawodu; Mildred Okwo
- Starring: Genevieve Nnaji; Joke Silva; Segun Arinze; Iyabo Amoke; Chet Anekwe; Najite Dede; Kalu Ikeagwu; Nobert Young; Ebele Okaro-Onyiuke; Ekwi Onwuemene; Gbenga Richards
- Cinematography: Cricket Peters
- Edited by: Ty Rawls
- Music by: Andre Manga
- Release date: 30 April 2006 (Silver Spring)
- Country: Nigeria
- Language: English

30 Days is a 2006 Nigerian action thriller film written and directed by Mildred Okwo. The film received 8 nominations at the 2008 Africa Movie Academy Awards, with Joke Silva taking the award for Best Supporting Actress.

== Cast ==
- Genevieve Nnaji as Chinora Onu
- Joke Silva as Dupe Ajayi
- Segun Arinze as Inspector Shobowale
- Ntalo Okorie
- Chet Anekwe as Kene Alumona
- Najite Dede as Temilola brisbee
- Kalu Ikeagwu as Jerry Ehime
- Nobert Young as Pastor Hart
- Ebele Okaro-Onyiuke as Mama Alero
- Ekwi Onwuemene as Faye Dako
- Gbenga Richards as Mr. President

== Synopsis ==
In a country where assassination and corruption takes place, a young man found a lady at a club whom he falls in love with. However the lady is one of the members of a group of assassins that murder corrupt government officials in the country.

== See also ==
- List of Nigerian films of 2006
