= Jeta Amata =

Nigerian filmmaker (born 1974)

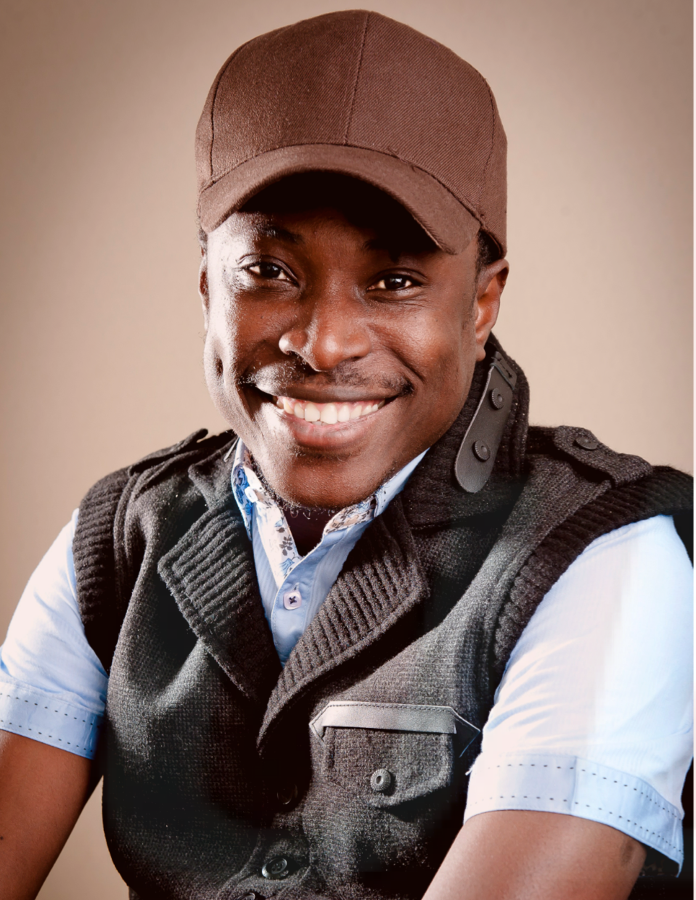
- Born: 21 August 1974 (age 52)
- Citizenship: Nigerian
- Education: Benue State University
- Occupation: Filmmaker
- Notable work: Black November
- Father: Zack Amata
- Relatives: Fred Amata

Jeta Amata is a Nigerian filmmaker, born on August 21, 1974, to popular Nigerian actor Zack Amata. He comes from a family of veteran filmmakers including Ifoghale Amata, Zack Amata and Fred Amata. Growing up in the film industry, following his family's passion for film, Jeta produced and directed his first film, Glamour Boyz, at the age of 21, making it no surprise when he began to rise in the world of film and entertainment.

== Education ==
Amata studied Theater Arts at Benue State University in Makurdi, Nigeria.

== Career ==
Amata's work first went global when he produced a documentary film for the British Broadcasting Corporation (BBC) in 2003, using his film Game of Life as footage for the documentary. He holds 53 nominations and 10 wins for film awards in Africa, Europe and the United States, and is considered one of the most successful filmmakers to come out of West Africa.

Michel Joseph Martelly, President of Haiti, made Jeta Amata a Goodwill Ambassador to Haiti.

Amata worked with Academy Award winner Kim Basinger, Academy Award nominee Mickey Rourke, and music superstars Akon and Wyclef Jean on the 2012 film Black November.

== Summary of works ==
=== 2004–11 ===
Amata's short film The Alexa Affair premiered at the 2004 Berlin Film Festival.

Amata's film The Amazing Grace, which won the Best West African Film Award at the 2006 Screen Nations Awards UK, holds the honour of being the first Nigerian film to be screened at the Cannes Film Festival.

Soon afterwards, Amata would be recognized for such movies as Inale and Mary Slessor.

=== 2012–present ===
Black November premiered at the United Nations during the General Assembly in 2012 and was also screened at the Kennedy Center as well as at the Library of Congress in Washington, D.C. The film inspired the sponsoring of a bi-partisan resolution on the Niger Delta of Nigeria members of the 112th United States Congress, H.CON.RES.121.

Amata had screenings of his documentary Into the Delta, on the situation of the Niger Delta, shown in nine universities in the United States, including NYU, George Washington University, UCLA and Cornell.

== Filmography ==
Year	Title	Role	Notes
1996	Glamour Boys	Director, writer, producer	
1997	No More Food for the Gods	Director, writer, producer	
2001	Mutanda	Director, writer, producer	a
2002	Black Mamba (video)	Director, writer, producer	
2002	Tears of a Woman	Director, writer, producer	
2003	Unconditional Love	Director, writer, producer	
2003	Love Entangle (video)	Director, writer, producer	starring: Kate Henshaw, Segun Arinze
2003	Dangerous Desire (video)	Director, writer, producer	
2004	Queen (video)	Director, writer, producer	starring: Nkiru Sylvanus, Stella Damasus
2004	Queen 2 (video)	Director, writer, producer	
2004	The Alexa Affair (short)	Director, writer, actor	
2005	Wheel of Change	Director, writer, producer	starring: Mbong Amata, Stella Damasus
2005	Ultimate Crisis	Director, writer, producer	
2005	Last Game	Director, writer, producer	starring: Dakore Akande, Rita Dominic, Ini Edo, Enyinna Nwigwe
2006	The Amazing Grace	Director, writer, producer	starring: Mbong Amata, Joke Silva
2007	Game of Life	Director, writer, producer	
2008	Mary Slessor (TV series)	Director, writer, producer	starring: Mbong Amata, Enyinna Nwigwe
2009	Queen Amina	Director, writer, producer	
2010	Inale	Director, writer, producer	starring: Mbong Amata, Caroline Chikezie, Ini Edo
2012	Black November	Director, writer, producer	starring: Mbong Amata, Enyinna Nwigwe
2013	The American King	Director, writer, producer	
2016	Road to Redemption	Director, writer, producer	starring: Viva Bianca, Akon, Margaret Avery, Zack Amata

== Awards and nominations ==
- Verona International African Film Festival, Best Film, Black November, 2011
- Verona International African Film Festival, Audience Award, Black November, 2011
- Monaco International Film Festival, Most Entertaining Film, Inale, 2011
- Copenhagen Nollywood Festival, Best Film, Black November, 2011
- American Black Film Festival (ABFF), Best Director (nominated), Black November, 2011
- American Black Film Festival (ABFF), Best Picture (nominated), Black November, 2011
- American Black Film Festival (ABFF), Best Screenplay, Black November, 2011
- Nigerian Entertainment Awards, Best Film, Inale, 2011
- African Academy Movie Awards AAMA, Best Nigerian Film (nominated), Inale, 2011
- NFVSB Awards Nigeria, Best Film, Inale, 2010
- Abuja International Film Festival, Audience Awards, Mary Slessor, 2009
- Abuja International Film Festival, Best Short, Mary Slessor, 2009
- SIMA AWARDS, Best Director, The Amazing Grace, 2008
- Screen Nations Awards, Best West African Film, The Amazing Grace, 2007
- Nigeria Movie Awards NMA, Best Director (nominated), The Amazing Grace, 2007
- Nigeria Movie Awards NMA, Best Picture (nominated), The Amazing Grace, 2007
- Nigeria Movie Awards NMA, Best Cinematography, The Amazing Grace, 2007
- African Academy Movie Awards AAMA, Best Director (nominated), The Amazing Grace, 2006
- African Academy Movie Awards AAMA, Best Cinematography, The Amazing Grace, 2006
- African Academy Movie Awards AAMA, Best Picture (nominated), The Amazing Grace, 2006
- African Academy Movie Awards AAMA, Best Screenplay (nominated), The Amazing Grace, 2006

== Personal life ==
In 2001 at an audition in Calabar he met Mbong Amata. Two years later, when she was 18, they began dating. They married in 2008 and their daughter Veno was born later that year. In 2013 they separated and in 2014 they divorced.

Amata is currently in a partnership with Vanessa Teemsma, who has worked in production on his films, including Black November. Amata and Teemsma welcomed a son in 2019, named Kessiena Donald Amata, the middle name was after Teemsma's father.

== See also ==
- List of Nigerian film producers
- Category:Films directed by Jeta Amata
