= Knuckle City =

2019 film

- Theatrical release poster
- Directed by: Jahmil X.T. Qubeka
- Written by: Jahmil X.T. Qubeka
- Produced by: Layla Swart
- Starring: Bongile Mantsai; Siv Ngesi; Nomhle Nkonyeni; Patrick Ndlovu; Thembekile Komani
- Cinematography: Willie Nel
- Edited by: Layla Swart
- Release dates: 18 July 2019 (Durban IFF); 28 February 2020 (South Africa)
- Running time: 111 minutes
- Country: South Africa
- Language: IsiXhosa

Knuckle City is a 2019 South African crime sports film written and directed by Jahmil X.T. Qubeka. It was screened in the Contemporary World Cinema section at the 2019 Toronto International Film Festival. It was selected as the South African entry for the Best International Feature Film at the 92nd Academy Awards, but was ultimately not nominated.

== Cast ==
- Bongile Mantsai as Dudu Nyakama
- Thembekile Komani as Duke Nyakama
- Zolisa Xaluva as Art Nyakama
- Siv Ngesi as Goatee
- Nomhle Nkonyeni as Ma Bokwana
- Patrick Ndlovu as Bra Pat
- Angela Sithole as Minky
- Owen Sejake as Bra Links
- Khulu Skenjana as Square-Jaw
- Faniswa Yisa as Mother Hen
- Elethu Mfombi as young Duke Nyakama
- Mbasa Tsetsana as Mondli
- Awethu Hleli as Nosisi
- Inga Mtshizana as young Dudu Nyakama
- Ntsika Majiba as Puffy Face

== Reception ==
=== Critical response ===
On Rotten Tomatoes, it has a perfect approval rating of 100% based on seven reviews and an average rating of 7.8/10.

Film critic Anne T. Donahue of Globe and Mail gave the film 3 and half stars out of four, saying, "It is a movie that’s as defined by what one’s heart can endure as much as it is by its mesmerizing sport, its acting and how long it will stay with you. Knuckle City cannot be overlooked." Courtney Small of In The Seats gave it a 4/5 stars and praised the fresh take on traditional genre tropes, saying "Bathed in a sea of poverty and corruption, Knuckle City challenges traditional notions of masculinity to expose how toxic and destructive it is. Spreading like a virus, the sins that the brothers’ inherited from their father are part of a greater systemic problem impacting the township of Mdantsane. Unflinchingly gritty, Knuckle City brings a fresh South African take on traditional genre tropes. Engulfed in beautiful cinematography that is both sweeping and intimate, Qubeka shows that actions to uplift family, and not endanger them, is what real manhood is all about." In 2020 MoJo Global Arts brokered a deal with Showtime (TV network) to air Knuckle City on Showtime.

== Accolades ==
Knuckle City took home five awards at the 2020 South African Film and Television Awards (SAFTAs) including Best Actor in a Feature Film, Best Supporting Actor in a Feature Film, Best Achievement in Directing in a Feature Film, Best Achievement in Production Design in a Feature Film and Best Achievement in Make-Up and Hairstyling in a Feature Film.

== See also ==
- List of boxing films
- List of submissions to the 92nd Academy Awards for Best International Feature Film
- List of South African submissions for the Academy Award for Best International Feature Film
- Cinema of South Africa
