= Sitanda =

2006 film by Izu Ojukwu

- Directed by: Izu Ojukwu
- Produced by: Amstel Malta
- Starring: Stephanie Okereke; Azizat Sadiq; Ireti Doyle; Justus Esiri; Bimbo Manuel; Ali Nuhu
- Music by: Daps
- Release date: 2006 (Nigeria)
- Country: Nigeria
- Language: English

Sitanda is a 2006 Nigerian adventure / drama film directed by Africa Movie Academy Award winner Ali Nuhu, and written by Fidel Akpom. The film received 9 nominations and won 5 awards at the 3rd Africa Movie Academy Awards in 2007, including Best Picture, Best Nigerian Film, Best Director and Best Original Screenplay.

== Cast ==
- Ali Nuhu as Sitanda
- Stephanie Okereke as Ann
- Azizat Sadiq as Sermu
- Ireti Doyle as Princess
- Justus Esiri as Papa Ann
- Bimbo Manuel as Amanzee
- Fidelis Abdulrahman as Ebule
- Wale Adebayo as Kidnapper
- Love Adejo as Village Nurse
- Tolu Daniel Aluko as young Sitanda
- Segun Alagbe as Slave Guard
- Sunday Eze as Elder
- Augusta Isaac as Queen
- Tina Ofikwu as Mama Ann

== See also ==
- List of Nigerian films of 2006
