= Adekunle Adejuyigbe =

Nigerian filmmaker

Adekunle "Nodash" Adejuyigbe
- Born: Adekunle Adejuyigbe
- Occupations: Film director, Film editor, Cinematographer, Film maker

Adekunle “Nodash” Adejuyigbe, is a Nigerian film maker and producer. He has served as a producer and executive producer for several documentaries and commercials for international organisations.

Adekunle commenced his career in a TV network as a producer, writer and director of TV shows and documentaries. He became the Creative Director and head of production of the TV network before leaving to start his film production company - "Something Unusual Studios".

In 2015, he was shortlisted among the 21 cinematographers to participate in the cinematography master class organised by The Berlin Film Festival, Germany. He is the team lead of “The Elite Film Team”. Adekunle is the writer, director and producer of “The Delivery Boy”, which has screened in 4 continents and won the best Nigerian Film Award at Africa International Film Festival (AFRIFF), 2018.

== Awards and recognitions ==
- Participant for the Cinematography Master Class organized by the Berlin International Film Festival in Germany, 2015.
- Best Editing 2013 Nollywood Movies Awards for the movie Journey to Self, 2013
- Best Editor, IN Short International Film festival in Lagos, done in collaboration with Goethe Institute, 2011
- Best Editing, Nigerian Movie Award for the movie, The Young Smoker, 2011
- Best Cinematographer and Best Editor, Nigerian Music Video Awards, 2011

== Filmography ==
- 2017: Director of Photography, The Bridge
- 2017: Director of Photography, The Tribunal
- 2016: Director, Director of Photography, Gidi Up Season 3
- 2016: Director of Photography, Editor, Isoken (2017 film)
- 2015: Second Unit, Cinematographer, Fifty (film)
- 2015: Director of Photography, The Encounter
- 2015: Cinematographer, Ireti
- 2013: Editor, Director of Photography Journey to Self

== See also ==
- List of Nigerian film producers
