= Adesuwa =

2012 Nigerian historical drama film

Adesuwa (A Wasted Lust)
- Directed by: Lancelot Oduwa Imasuen
- Written by: Ossa Earliece
- Produced by: John Chukwuma Abua; Lancelot Oduwa Imasuen
- Starring: Olu Jacobs; Bob-Manuel Udokwu; Ngozi Ezeonu; Iyobosa Olaye; Kofi Adjorlolo
- Cinematography: Lanre Oluwole; Ejim Fortune Kezi
- Edited by: Victor Ehi-Amedu
- Music by: Henry Edo
- Production company: John Films Sources
- Distributed by: Nollywood Distributions
- Release date: November 26, 2012
- Running time: 124 minutes
- Country: Nigeria
- Languages: English; Bini
- Budget: ₦18 million

Adesuwa (A Wasted Lust) is a 2012 Nigerian historical fiction film produced and directed by Lancelot Oduwa Imasuen. It stars Olu Jacobs, Bob-Manuel Udokwu, and Kofi Adjorlolo. The film was scheduled to be released in theatres across Nigeria on 4 May 2012, but due to an ownership rift between the director and executive producer, it was released on DVD. The film was shot in Benin City, Edo State.

It received 10 nominations at the 8th Africa Movie Academy Awards, and won the awards for Achievement in Costume Design, Achievement in Visual effects, and Best Nigerian film.

== Cast ==
- Olu Jacobs as Ezomo
- Bob-Manuel Udokwu
- Kofi Adjorlolo
- Ngozi Ezeonu
- Cliff Igbinovia
- Jennifer Iyobosa Olaye - Adesuwa
- Martha Ankomah

== Reception ==
Nollywood Reinvented gave Adesuwa a 49% rating; praising its production, directing, and originality. The reviewer found the film interesting but not especially gripping.

== See also ==
- List of Nigerian films of 2012
