= White Waters =

- Directed by: Izu Ojukwu
- Starring: Joke Silva Rita Dominic OC Ukeje
- Release date: 2007
- Country: Nigeria

White Waters is a 2007 Nigerian slice of life drama film directed by Izu Ojukwu. The film received 12 nominations and won four awards at the 4th Africa Movie Academy Awards including winning Best Director, Best Cinematography, Best Sound and Best Actress award in a Supporting Role for Joke Silva.

== Cast ==
- OC Ukeje as Melvin
- Rita Dominic as Norlah
- Joke Silva as Grandmother of Melvin
- Hoom Suk as Banji
- Tony Ofili Akpon as Coach Samson
- Edward Fom as Emeka
- Fidelis Abdulrahman as Little Melvin
- Precious Olaitan as David
- B.S. Abok as Ahmed
- Tolu Daniel Aluko as Shaun
- Kalbang Afsa Clement as Dutemba
- James Moses Dadung as Mr. Atola
- Blessing Emmanuel as Bridget
- Jonah Gwamna as Musa
- Adamu Labaran as Coach Menor
- Alfred Mgbejume as Chris
- Ugbade Nathaniel as Pin Pon
- Sarah Williams as Coach Clara
