= Teco Benson =

Nigerian filmmaker

- Citizenship: Nigerian
- Occupations: Director; Producer; Screenwriter; Actor
- Years active: 1994 - Present
- Known for: Red Hot, Accident, Mission to Nowhere, State of Emergency, Two Brides and a Baby, High Blood Pressure, Explosion
- Awards: Director of the Year at the 2011 Best of Nollywood Awards

Teco Benson (February 28, 1971) is a Nigerian film director, screenwriter, producer, and actor. He was nominated for Best Director at the Africa Movie Academy Awards in 2006 and 2008, and won Director of the Year at the 2011 Best of Nollywood Awards. In 2012, he was decorated by President Goodluck Jonathan of Nigeria as a Member of the Order of the Federal Republic.

== Career ==
Teco was a civil servant working with the Anambra State Environmental Protection Agency. He started his career as an actor in 1994, then went into scriptwriting and film production in 1995 before switching to directing in 1997. In 2003, he made the first Sierra Leone-made film titled Blood Diamonds.

== Personal life ==
Teco is a born-again Christian who got married in 2001 with 3 kids. He can prepare jollof rice, bitter leaf soup, and vegetable soup.

== Filmography ==
Year	Title	Role
1996	Compromise (writer and actor only)	
1997	Atrocity (writer only)	
1997	Water-loo (also actor)	
1998	Confusion (writer only)	
1998	Dirty Game	
1998	Suicide Mission (writer only)	
1998	Power to Bind (also writer and producer)	
1998	Scores to Settle (writer only)	
1998	Magic Money (also writer and producer)	
1999	Day of Reckoning	
1999	End of the Wicked (also writer)	
1999	Holy Crime (also writer and producer)	
1999	The Price	
1999	Cursed From Beyond	
1999	The Bastard (also writer)	
2000	Elastic Limit	
2000	Grace to Grass (also writer and producer)	
2000	Highway to the Grave (also writer)	
2000	State of Emergency	
2000	Wasted Years	
2001	Broad Daylight	
2002	Formidable Force	
2002	Stupid! (also producer)	
2002	Born 2 Suffer	
2002	Highway to the Grave	
2003	Accidental Discharge	
2003	Power to Bind	
2004	Blood Diamonds	
2004	Danger Signal (also producer)	
2004	War Front	
2004	State of Emergency 1 & 2	
2005	Day of Atonement	
2005	Six Demons	
2006	Explosion	
2006	Silence of the Gods 1 & 2	
2008	Mission to Nowhere 1 & 2	
2010	The Fake Prophet (also writer)	
2010	High Blood Pressure	
2010	Dr. Cruel	
2011	Two Brides and a Baby	
2013	Accident (also writer)	
2015	Blood in the Lagoon	
2017	Mr & Mrs, Chapter 2	
2018	Just One Blood	
2000	Executive Crime	
1999	Eye for Eye	
	False Alarm	
	Felony	
	Iku doro	
	Mfana Ibagha	
	Red Hot	
	The Senator	
	Terror	

== See also ==
- List of Nigerian actors
- List of Nigerian film producers
- List of Nigerian film directors
