= Izu Ojukwu =

Nigerian film director

- Born: 1970 (age 55–56); Jos, Nigeria
- Occupation: Director
- Notable work: 4:4:44 (2022); Amina (2021); Power of One (2018); '76 (2016); Alero's Symphony (2011); The Child (2010); Nnenda (2009); Distance Between (2008); Cindy's Note (2008); Minority Tension (2007); White Waters (2007); Laviva (2007); The Broken Shield (2006); Sitanda (2006); 3rd Africa Movie Academy Awards 2007 for Best Director; GL 1 & 2 (2005); Otondo (2004); Across the Niger (2004); Moving Train (2003); Battle of Love (2003); Desperadoes 1 & 2 (2001); Eleventh Hour (2001); Love Boat (2001); The World is Mine (2001); Showdown (2000); Iva (1999); Icabod (1993)
- Awards: Best Director for Sitanda; Best Picture and Best Nigerian Film

Izu Ojukwu is a Nigerian film director (born, 1970s). In 2007, he won Best Director for Sitanda at the 3rd Africa Movie Academy Awards, which received nine nominations and won five awards at the event, including Best Picture and Best Nigerian Film.

== Career ==
He is well known for directing films that chronicle Nigerian history. His latest film, Festac '77, premiered at the 2025 Cannes Films Festival, marking as a milestone for the Nigerian film industry. A documentary created by American researchers and scholars spotlighted the innovation and creativity in his work. Ojukwu was born in Jos, where he began his filmmaking journey by building a makeshift cinema in his father’s compound.

Ojukwu has been nominated for and won numerous awards, including winning the African Movie Academy Awards: 2017 Best Nigerian Film (’76); 2009 Best Cinematography (Cindy’s Notes); 2008 Best Cinematography (White Waters); and 2007 Best Director and Best Nigerian Film (Sitanda). Alongside Okey Ogunjiefor, he won Best Overall Movie at the 2022 African Magic Viewers' Choice Awards for Amina.

== Selected filmography (as director) ==
- 4:4:44 (2022)
- Amina (2021)
- Power of One (2018)
- '76 (2016)
- Alero's Symphony (2011)
- The Child (2010)
- Nnenda (2009)
- Distance Between (2008)
- Cindy's Note (2008)
- Minority Tension (2007)
- White Waters (2007)
- Laviva (2007)
- The Broken Shield (2006)
- Sitanda (2006)
- 3rd Africa Movie Academy Awards 2007 for Best Director
- GL 1 & 2 (2005)
- Otondo (2004)
- Across the Niger (2004)
- Moving Train (2003)
- Battle of Love (2003)
- Desperadoes 1 & 2 (2001)
- Eleventh Hour (2001)
- Love Boat (2001)
- The World is Mine (2001)
- Showdown (2000)
- Iva (1999)
- Icabod (1993)

== See also ==
- List of Nigerian film producers
