= Across the Niger =

2004 Nigerian historical drama film

- Directed by: Izu Ojukwu
- Written by: Kabat Esosa Egbon.
- Produced by: Kingsley Ogoro
- Starring: Kanayo O. Kanayo; Segun Arinze; Chiwetalu Agu
- Production company: Kingsley Ogoro Productions
- Release date: 2004
- Running time: 82 minutes
- Country: Nigeria

Across the Niger is a 2004 Nigerian drama film produced by Kingsley Ogoro, directed by Izu Ojukwu and written by Kabat Esosa Egbon. It is a sequel to Battle of Love and makes a bold yet sensitive foray into the moral dilemmas of the Nigerian Civil War (1967–1970). It is a story of Nigeria, a love story of Africa: its past, its present and its future. The film stars Chiwetalu Agu, who was nominated for best actor in a supporting role at the 4th Africa Movie Academy Awards for his performance.

== Synopsis ==
Before the start of the conflict, Major Dubem, a prince from the east, served as a soldier in northern Nigeria. While he was there, he married a northerner named Habiba. Dubem fled to the east with his wife because his life was in danger in the north.

Even though she is pregnant for him, his father, the king and the village elders refused to accept Habiba as one of them. They insist that he must wed the lady that they have chosen for him.

Contrarily, his uncle, a liar and a cheat, sells his people out to their enemies.

== Cast ==
Across the Niger features several Nigerian actors.

- Kanayo O. Kanayo as Dubem
- Rekiya Attah as Habiba
- Segun Arinze
- Chiwetalu Agu
- Ireti Doyle
- Chinedu Ikedieze
- Pete Edochie
- Ramsey Nouah
