= Princess Tyra =

- DVD Poster
- Directed by: Frank Rajah Arase
- Produced by: Abdul Salam Mumuni
- Starring: Van Vicker; Yvonne Nelson; Jackie Appiah; Oge Okoye; Kofi Adjorlolo; Kalsoume Sinare
- Edited by: Dapo Ola Daniels
- Production company: Venus Films
- Release date: 2007
- Running time: 150 min
- Country: Ghana
- Language: English

Princess Tyra is a 2007 Ghanaian drama film directed by Frank Rajah Arase, and starring Jackie Aygemang, Van Vicker & Yvonne Nelson. The film received 12 nominations and won 2 awards at the 2008 Africa Movie Academy Awards, including the awards for Best Costume & Best Makeup.

== Cast ==
- Yvonne Nelson - Princess Tyra
- Jackie Appiah - Ashley
- Van Vicker - Prince Kay
- Oge Okoye - Princess Elizabeth
- Kalsoume Sinare - theo Agnes
- Seli Kenedy - Serwa
- Paa George - Elder
- Rama Brew - Queen
- Sophia Ashama - Betty
- Natalie Amma - Lisa Amma
- Kofi Adjorlolo - King
- Roseline Ngissah - Joyce
- Elezra Ofori - Ajua

== Reception ==
Nollywood Reinvented gave it a 4 out of 5 rating concluding that "Say what you may against the movie, you cannot deny, however, that it was an interesting story".
