= Africa Movie Academy Award for Best Actor in a Leading Role =

Award presented annually by the Africa Movie Academy

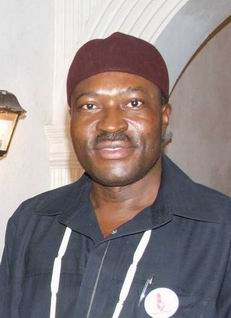
- The 2006 recipient: Kanayo O. Kanayo
- Awarded for: Best Performance by a Male Actor in a Leading Role
- Country: Nigeria
- Presented by: Africa Film Academy
- First award: May 30, 2005; 21 years ago
- Most recent winner: Zolisa Xaluva, The Queenstown Kings (2024)

Highlights
- Most awards: Richard Mofe-Damijo (2)
- Most nominations: Richard Mofe-Damijo (2)
- Website: ama-awards.com

The Africa Movie Academy Award for Best Actor in a Leading Role is an award presented annually by the Africa Film Academy. It has been awarded since the 1st Africa Movie Academy Awards to an actor who has delivered an outstanding performance in a leading role in a film.

The Best Actor in a Leading Role award has been presented 21 times, to 21 actors. The first winner was Richard Mofe-Damijo for his roles in The Mayors (2004). The most recent winner is Zolisa Xaluva for The Queenstown Kings (2024). The record for most wins is two, held by Richard Mofe-Damijo. The record for most nominations is two, also held by Damijo.

== Winners and nominees ==
Year	Actor	Film	Ref.
2005 (1st)	Richard Mofe Damijo	The Mayors	
2006 (2nd)	Kanayo O. Kanayo	Family Battle	
2006 (2nd)	Osita Iheme/Chinedu Ikedieze	Secret adventure	
2006 (2nd)	Bil Aka	Sofia	
2006 (2nd)	Nosa Ehinwen	Anini	
2006 (2nd)	Modu Cessay	Arrou	
2007 (3rd)	Olu Jacobs	Dancing Heart	
2007 (3rd)	Ganiu Nofiu	Apesin	
2007 (3rd)	Kunle Abogunloko	Covenant Church	
2007 (3rd)	Ayo Lijadu	Maroko	
2008 (4th)	Nkem Owoh	Stronger Than Pain	
2008 (4th)	Van Vicker	Return Of Beyonce/Princess Tyra	
2008 (4th)	Kanayo O. Kanayo	Across the Niger	
2008 (4th)	OC Ukeje	Check Point	
2008 (4th)	Peter Badejo	White Waters	
2009 (5th)	Farouk Al-Fichawi	Seventh Heaven	
2009 (5th)	Godfrey Odhiamba	From a Whisper	
2009 (5th)	Mike Ezuruonye	The Assassin	
2009 (5th)	Majid Michel	Agony of the Christ	
2009 (5th)	Peter Badejo	Arugba	
2010 (6th)	Ramsey Nouah	The Figurine	
2010 (6th)	Lucky Ejim	The Tenant	
2010 (6th)	Majid Michel	Sin of a Soul	
2010 (6th)	Sadiq Abu	Soul Diaspora	
2010 (6th)	John Osie Tutu Agyeman	I Sing of a Well	
2011 (7th)	Themba Ndaba	Hopeville	ref
2011 (7th)	Patsha Bay	Viva Riva!	ref
2011 (7th)	Jimmy Jean-Louis	Sinking Sands	ref
2011 (7th)	Ekon Blankson	Checkmate	ref
2011 (7th)	Antar Laniyan	Yemoja	ref
2011 (7th)	Majid Michel	Pool Party	ref
2012 (8th)	Majid Michel	Somewhere in Africa	ref
2012 (8th)	Menzi Ngubane	How to Steal 2 Million	ref
2012 (8th)	Chet Anekwe	Unwanted Guest	ref
2012 (8th)	Jafta Mamabolo	Otelo Burning	ref
2012 (8th)	Karabo Lance	48	ref
2012 (8th)	Wale Ojo	Phone Swap	ref
2012 (8th)	Hakeem Kae-Kazim	Man on Ground	ref
2013 (9th)	Justus Esiri	Assassins Practice	ref
2013 (9th)	OC Ukeje	Alan Poza	ref
2013 (9th)	Bimbo Manuel	Heroes and Zeros	ref
2013 (9th)	Lindani Nkosi	Zama Zama	ref
2013 (9th)	Hlomla Dandala	Contract	ref
2013 (9th)	Femi Jacobs	The Meeting	ref
2013 (9th)	Amurin Wumnembom	Ninah’s Dowry	ref
2014 (10th)	Mothusi Magano	Of Good Report	ref
2014 (10th)	Zengo Ngqobe	Forgotten Kingdom	ref
2014 (10th)	Kanayo O. Kanayo	Apaye	ref
2014 (10th)	Joseph Benjamin	Murder at Prime Suites	ref
2014 (10th)	Adjetey Anang	Potomanto	ref
2014 (10th)	Majid Michel	Brother's Keeper	ref
2015 (11th)	Sadiq Daba	October 1	ref
2015 (11th)	Tony Kroroge	Cold Harbour	ref
2015 (11th)	Sdumo Matshali	iNumber Number	ref
2015 (11th)	Abdoul Kareem Konate	Run	ref
2015 (11th)	Gerard Essomba	Le President	ref
2016 (12th)	Daniel K Daniel	Soldier's Story	ref
2016 (12th)	Oris Erhuero	The Cursed Ones	ref
2016 (12th)	OC Ukeje	Ayanda	ref
2016 (12th)	Fragrass Assande	Eye of the Storm	ref
2016 (12th)	Maps Maponyane	Tell Me Sweet Something	ref
2016 (12th)	Buiferi Yakoubi	La Pagne	ref
2017 (13th)	Jahwar Soudani	The Last of Us	
2017 (13th)	Sambasa Nzeribe	Slow Country	
2017 (13th)	Ibrahim Koma	Wùlu	
2017 (13th)	Richard Mofe Damijo	Oloibiri	
2017 (13th)	Amine Ennaji	A Mile in My Shoes	
2017 (13th)	David Oyelowo	Queen of Katwe	
2017 (13th)	Dann-Jacques Mouton	Call Me Thief	
2017 (13th)	Ramsey Nouah	'76	
2018 (14th)	Richard Mofe Damijo	Cross Roads	
2018 (14th)	Vuyo Dabula	Five Fingers for Marseilles	
2018 (14th)	Sam Dede	In My Country	
2018 (14th)	Sani Bouajla	The Blessed Vost	
2018 (14th)	OC Ukeje	Potato Potahto	
2018 (14th)	Chris Attoh	Esohe	
2018 (14th)	Oros Mampofu	Lucky Specials	
2018 (14th)	Frank Donga	Hakkunde	
2019 (15th)	Marc Zinga	The Mercy of the Jungle	
2019 (15th)	Gabriel Afolayan	Gold Statue	
2019 (15th)	Joseph Otsiman	The Burial of Kojo	
2019 (15th)	Chinedu Ikedieze	Lara and the Beat	
2019 (15th)	Jimmy Jean-Louis	Rattlesnakes	
2019 (15th)	Gil Alexandre	Redemption	
2019 (15th)	Ezra Mabengeza	Sew the Winter to My Skin	
2019 (15th)	Ayoub Bombwe	Fatuma	
2020 (16th)	Jimmy Jean-Louis	Desrances	
2020 (16th)	Gabriel Afolayan	Coming From Insanity	
2020 (16th)	Kang Quintus	The Fisherman's Diary	
2020 (16th)	Bongile Mantsai	Knuckle City	
2020 (16th)	Alphonse Menyo	Gold Coast Lounge	
2020 (16th)	Enyinna Nwigwe	Badamasi	
2020 (16th)	Robert Agengo/Mwaura Bilal/Andreo Kamau/ Xavier Ywawa	40 Sticks	
2020 (16th)	Darrin Dewitt Henson	Zulu Wedding	
2021 (17th)	Omar Abdi	The Gravedigger's Wife	
2021 (17th)	Gary Green	Fried Barry	
2021 (17th)	Lateef Adedimeji	Ayinla	
2021 (17th)	Melvin Alusa	Mission To Rescue	
2021 (17th)	Jude Akuwudike	Eyimofe	
2021 (17th)	David Njavera	Hairareb	
2021 (17th)	Nonso Bassey	La Femme Anjola	
2022 (18th)	Eugene Boateng	Borga	
2022 (18th)	Patrick Nkakalukanyi	Tembele	
2022 (18th)	Daniel Etim Effiong	Jolly Roger	
2022 (18th)	Gudrun Colombus Mwanyika	Tug of War	
2022 (18th)	Botlhale Mahlangu	Surviving Gaza	
2022 (18th)	Deyemi Okanlawon	Swallow	
2022 (18th)	Akah Nnani	Man of God	
2022 (18th)	Aaron Adatsi	Road to My Father's Compound	
2023 (19th)	Tobi Bakre	Brotherhood	
2023 (19th)	Richard Mofe-Damijo	4-4-44	
2023 (19th)	Marc Zinga	Omen	
2023 (19th)	Fernando Kamugisha	The Fallen Advocate	
2023 (19th)	Justin Mirichii	Shimoni	
2023 (19th)	Mike Danon	Sira	
2024 (20th)	Zolisa Xaluva	The Queenstown Kings	
2024 (20th)	Gabriel Afolayan	This Is Lagos	
2024 (20th)	Duncan Murunyu Mungai	Boda Love	
2024 (20th)	Nenesenor Abloso	Letters to Goddo	
2024 (20th)	Bucci Franklin	The Weekend	
2024 (20th)	Femi Jacobs	Anjola	
2024 (20th)	Chidi Mokeme	Out of Breath	
