= 16th Africa Movie Academy Awards =

2020 film awards ceremony

- Date: 20 December 2020
- Site: Online
- Hosted by: Lorenzo Menakaya

Highlights
- Best Film: The Milkmaid
- Most awards: The Milkmaid (5)
- Most nominations: Knuckle City (10)

The 2020 Africa Movie Academy Awards ceremony was held on Sunday 20 December 2020 online at the AMAA website due to the COVID-19 pandemic. The award night was hosted by Lorenzo Menakaya. After the film entries were submitted, the date for the announcement of nominees was shifted from 20 November to 30 November. Knuckle City led with 10 nominations followed by Desrances with 10 nominations. The Milkmaid won the most awards including Best film in an African language, Best film and Best Nigerian film.

== Awards ==
Winners are listed first and highlighted in boldface.

Best Film	Best Director
**The Milkmaid – Nigeria**; Knuckle City – South Africa; The Fisherman's Diary －Cameroon; The Ghost and the House of Truth – Nigeria; 40 Sticks – Kenya; Desrances – Burkina Faso; This is Not A Burial, It's a Resurrection – Lesotho; Gold Coast Lounge – Ghana	**Jeremiah Lemohang Mosese** **– This is Not a Burial, It's a Resurrection**; Akin Omotoso – The Ghost and House of Truth; Enah Johnscott – A Fisherman's Diary; Jahmil X.T Quebeka – Knuckle City; Desmond Ovbiagele – The Milkmaid; Victor Gatonye – 40 Sticks; Appoline Traore – Desrances Appoline Traore – Desrances; Pascal Aka – Gold Coast Lounge
Best Actor in a Leading Role	Best Actress in a Leading Role
**Jimmy Jean-Louis – Desrances**; Gabriel Afolayan – Coming From Insanity; Kang Quintus – The Fisherman's Diary; Bongile Mantsai – Knuckle City; Alphonse Menyo – Gold Coast Lounge; Eyinna Nwigwe – Badamasi; Robert Agengo/Mwaura Bilal/Andreo Kamau/ Xavier Ywawa – 40 Sticks; Darrin Dewitt Henson – Zulu Wedding	**Mary Twala Mhlongo** – This is Not A Burial, It's a Resurrection; Joselyn Dumas – Cold Feet; Meg Otanwa – For Maria: Ebun Pataki; Zenobia Kloppers – Fiela's Child; Elvina Ibru – The Bling Lagosians; Girley Jazama – The White Line; Kelly Khumalo – Zulu Wedding
Best Actor in a Supporting Role	Best Actress in a Supporting Role
**Ramsey Nouah Jnr – Living in Bondage: Breaking Free**; Arabrun Nyyeneque – 40 Sticks; Adjatey Annang - Gold Coast Lounge; Narcissus Afeli – Desrances; Cosson Chinepoh – The Fisherman's Diary	**Maryam Booth – The Milkmaid**; Chairmaine Mujeri – Mirage; Linda Ejiofor – 4th Republic; Ndano Tramanse –The Fisherman's Diary; Tina Mba – The Set Up; Faniswa Yisa – Knuckle City; Evelyne Juhen – Desrances
Achievement in Costume Design	Achievement in Makeup
**This Is Not a Burial, It's a Resurrection** －Lesotho; Heroes of Africa; Tette Quarshie – Ghana; The White Line – Namibia; Ibi (The Birth) – Nigeria; Foreigner's God – Nigeria	**The Milkmaid** – Nigeria; Knuckle City – South Africa; Ratnik – Nigeria; 1929 – Nigeria; Heroes of Africa; Tette Quarshie － Ghana
Achievement in Cinematography	Achievement in Production Design
**This Is Not a Burial, It's a Resurrection**; The Ghost and House of Truth; The Fisherman's Diary; Knuckle City; The Milkmaid; 40 Sticks; Desrances; Gold Coast Lounge	**Knuckle City**; Ratnik; Zulu Wedding; Perfect Picture: Ten Years Later; This Is Not a Burial, It's a Resurrection; Foreigner's God; Gold Coast Lounge; The Ghost and the House of Truth
Achievement in Editing	Achievement in Screenplay
**The Ghost and the House of Truth**; Perfect Picture: Ten Years Later; Knuckle City; 40 Sticks; Desrances	**The Fisherman's Diary**; For Maria: Ebun Pataki; The White Line; 4th Republic; Knuckle City; 40 Sticks; Perfect Picture: Ten Years Later; 3 Days To Go
Best Film in An African Language	Best Nigerian Film
**The Milkmaid – Nigeria**; Knuckle City – South Africa; This Is Not a Burial, It's a Resurrection – Lesotho; Fiela's Child – South Africa; The White Line – Namibia	**The Milkmaid**; Cold Feet; Living in Bondage: Breaking Free; 4th Republic; For Maria: Ebun Pataki; The Bling Lagosians; Coming From Insanity; The Ghost and The House of Truth
Best Short Film	Best Animation
**The Letter Reader – South Africa**; Baxu & the Giant – Namibia; Songs About My Mother – South Africa; Idi Amin's Boat – Uganda; Yahoo – Nigeria; SEMA (Speak Out) – DRC; A Canvas for a Visa – Senegal; After the War – Egypt	**I am leaving In Ghana Get Me Out of Here** **– Ghana**; From Here To Timbuktu – Kenya; Malaika (The Warrior Queen) – Nigeria/USA; A Special Gift – Mozambique; The Legend of Lwanda Magere – Kenya; FTFO – Nigeria; Sankofa – Cote D’Voire; A Gugle Day – Nigeria
Best Documentary	Best Film by an African Living Abroad
**No Gold for Kalsaka** **－ Burkina Faso**; January 15, 1970: Untold memoir of the Biafran War – Nigeria; Journey to Kenya – Sudan; Daysm of Cannibalism – South Africa; Finding Sally – Ethiopia/Canada; The Letter – Kenya; Becoming Black – Togo/Germany; Influence – South Africa	**No Shade** **– Clare Anyiam-Osigwe**; Eagles' Nest – Olivier Assoua; 2 Weeks in Lagos – Kathryn Fasegha; Idemuza – Aloaye Omoake; Between – Daniel Adenimokan
Best Diaspora Short Film	Best Diaspora Documentary
**Boxed – USA**; June 14 – USA; Egun – Brazil; Brick By Brick – USA	**Becoming Black – Germany**; Revolution From Afar – USA; Meeting My Father – France; If Objects Could Speak – Germany
Best Diaspora Feature	Best Soundtrack
**Joseph – Barbados**; Aiyai: Wrathful Soul – Australia; Lola – USA; A Day With Jerusa – Brazil; Black and Blue – USA	**Gold Coast Lounge – Ghana**; The Fisherman's Diary – Cameroon; Coming from Insanity – Nigeria; Zulu Wedding – South Africa; For Maria: Ebun Pataki – Nigeria; Walking with Shadows – Nigeria; Living in Bondage: Breaking Free – Nigeria; Mirage – Zimbabwe
Best Visual Effects	Best Sound
**Knuckle City – South Africa**; Heroes of Africa; Tette Quarshie – Ghana; Desrances – Burkina Faso; Living in Bondage: Breaking Free – Nigeria; Badamasi – Nigeria; Ratnik － Nigeria; Foreigner's God – Nigeria; A Taste of Our Land – Rwanda	**Fiela's Child – South Africa**; Knuckle City – South Africa; Children of the Storm – South Africa; The Ghost and House of Truth – Nigeria; For Maria: Ebun Pataki – Nigeria; 40 Sticks – Kenya; Desrances – Burkina Faso; Gold Coast Lounge – Ghana
Most Promising Actor	Best First Feature Film by a Director
**Faith Fidel – The Fisherman's Diary**; Naomi Nemlin – Desrances; Chimezie Imo – Nimbe; Swanky JKA – Living in Bondage: Breaking Free; Wayne Smith – Fiela's Child; Cina Soul – Gold Coast Lounge; Anthonieta Kalunta – The Milkmaid	**A Taste of Our Land – Yuhi Amuli**; Coming From Insanity – Akinyemi Sebastine Akinropo; Living in Bondage: Breaking free – Ramsey Nouah Jnr.; The Bling Lagosians – Bolanle Austen- Peters; For Maria: Ebun Pataki – Damilola E. Orimogunje; Zulu Wedding – Lineo Sekeleoana; Mirage – Malaika Mushandu; The White Line – Desiree Kahikopo-Meiffret
