= Gilbert Lukalia =

Kenyan actor and film director

- Citizenship: Kenyan
- Occupations: Actor; Writer; Director
- Years active: 2009–present
- Known for: The Marshal of Finland
- Notable work: Pray and Prey; Shattered; Mission to Rescue

Gilbert Lukalia is a Kenyan actor and film director.

== Career ==
Lukalia grew up in a military family and began his early career as a stage actor at the Kenya National Theatre. He has also worked in multiple positions in the film industry: as an assistant director and producer He is currently working at the Nairobi based Dream House Productions, which produces theatre plays, music events, TV-series and films both for Tv and big screen

He has acted and directed award-winning feature films and TV series in Kenya including Mission to Rescue, Shattered, Pray and Prey, Lost in Africa and the First Grader.

Mission to Rescue was in 2021 selected as Kenya's submission at the 94th Academy Awards in the Best International Feature Film category.

He has also directed some international films such as The Marshal of Finland. The film's world premiere was at The Helsinki International Love & Anarchy Film Festival on 28 September 2012.

He also directed Strength of A Woman in 2014 where it received nominations at the 2014 Kalasha Awards and won five awards. It won awards for Best Feature Film, Best Director, Best Actress, Best Lighting and Best Original Score. It had stars renowned Kenyan actors with Rose K. Njoroge taking the lead role and Laura Leila Wingate, Ashford Kirimi, Sandra Dhacha taking up supporting roles which they expertly and vividly depict.

== Filmography ==
=== As Director ===
Year	Title	Category
2011	Shattered	Drama
2012	The Marshal of Finland	Drama
2012	Drunk Dead	Drama
2013	Exposure	Drama
2014	Double Trouble	Drama
2014	Malaika Nights	TV Movie
2014	The Hands That Feeds You	TV Movie
2014	Gun Theory	TV Movie
2015	Strength of a Woman	
2014–2015	Pray & Prey	TV Series
2021	Mission to Rescue	Action Thriller
2022–2024	Salem	TV Series
2023	Kiza	Drama
2024	1992	Short film
2025	Reckless	TV Series

=== As actor ===
Year	Title	Category
2009–2013	Nairobi Law	TV Series
2009	The Resurrection	Short film
2010	Lost in Africa	Drama Thriller
2013	It's Us	Drama
2014	Strata	TV Mini Series
2017	Kidnapped	Thriller
2017	Pendo	Short film
2019	Chuma	Short film
2021	Akinyi	Short film
2021	Mission to Rescue	Action Thriller
2022	Kam U Stay	TV Series
2021	1992	Short film

== Awards and Nominatations ==
Year	Award	Work	Category	Results
2010	Kalasha International Film and TV Awards	Siri	Best Lead Actor in a TV Drama	Nominated
2011	Kalasha International Film and TV Awards	Siri	Best Lead Actor in a TV Drama	Nominated
2012	Kalasha International Film and TV Awards	Shattered	Best Director	Nominated
2014	Kalasha International Film and TV Awards	The Marshal of Finland	Best Supporting Actor in a Film	Nominated
2017	Kalasha International Film and TV Awards	Kidnapped	Best Supporting Actor in a Film	Nominated
2021	African Movie Academy Awards	Mission to Rescue	Best Director	Nominated
