= Africa Movie Academy Award for Best Editing =

African Film Academy award

The Africa Movie Academy Award for Best Editing is an annual merit by the Africa Film Academy to reward movies with the best film-editing for the year.

Best Editing
Year	Film	Editor	Result
2005	Yesterday		Won
2005	The Mayors		Nominated
2005	Dangerous Twins		Nominated
2006	Rising Moon		Won
2006	Family Battle		Nominated
2006	Day of Atonement		Nominated
2006	Sofia		Nominated
2007	Mokili		Won
2007	Abeni		Nominated
2007	The Amazing Grace		Nominated
2008	Divizions or Division		Won
2008	Run Baby Run		Nominated
2008	Across the Niger		Nominated
2008	Black Friday		Nominated
2008	Mission to Nowhere		Nominated
2009	From a Whisper		Won
2009	Cindy’s Note		Nominated
2009	Reloaded		Nominated
2009	Modupe Temi		Nominated
2009	Battle of the Soul		Nominated
2010	The Child		Won
2010	Perfect Picture		Nominated
2010	Season of a Life		Nominated
2010	Lilies of the Ghetto		Nominated
2010	Heart of Men		Nominated
2011	Soul Boy		Won
2011	Sinking Sands		Nominated
2011	Hopeville		Nominated
2011	Viva Riva!		Nominated
2011	Tango With Me		Nominated
2012	How to Steal 2 Million		Won
2012	Otelo Burning		Nominated
2012	Unwanted Guest		Nominated
2012	Man on Ground		Nominated
2012	Algiers Murder		Nominated
2012	Alero’s Symphony		Nominated
2013	Heroes and Zeros		Won
2013	Last Flight to Abuja		Nominated
2013	Contract		Nominated
2013	Elelwani		Nominated
2013	Nairobi Half Life		Nominated
2013	Uhlanga The Mark		Nominated
2014	Potomanto		Won
2014	Of Good Report		Nominated
2014	Accident		Nominated
2014	Once Upon A Road Trip		Nominated
2014	Felix		Nominated
2015	Timbuktu		Won
2015	iNumber Number		Nominated
2015	Triangle Going to America		Nominated
2015	Run		Nominated
2015	October 1		Nominated
2016	Hear Me Move		Won
2016	Behind Closed Doors		Nominated
2016	Rebecca		Nominated
2016	The Cursed Ones		Nominated
2016	Eye of the Storm		Nominated
2017	Félicité		Won
2017	Call Me Thief		Nominated
2017	Vaya		Nominated
2017	While We Live		Nominated
2017	The CEO		Nominated
2018	Hotel Called Memory		Won
2018	Pop Lock ‘N’ Roll		Nominated
2018	While We Live		Nominated
2018	Lucky Specials		Nominated
2018	The Blessed Vost		Nominated
2019	Rafiki		Won
2019	The Delivery Boy		Nominated
2019	The Burial of Kojo		Nominated
2019	The Last Victims		Nominated
2019	Gold Statue		Nominated
2019	Diamond in the Sky		Nominated
2019	Sew the Winter to My Skin		Nominated
2019	The Mercy of the Jungle		Nominated
2020	The Ghost and the House of Truth		Won
2020	Perfect Picture: Ten Years Later		Nominated
2020	Knuckle City		Nominated
2020	40 Sticks		Nominated
2020	Desrances		Nominated
2021	Eyimofe		Won
2021	Mission to Rescue		Nominated
2021	Omo Ghetto: The Saga		Nominated
2021	Nyala (The Kidnapping)		Nominated
2021	Fried Barry		Nominated
