= 10th Africa Movie Academy Awards =

2014 film awards ceremony

- Official poster
- Date: 24 May 2014
- Site: Gabriel Okara Cultural Centre, Yenagoa, Bayelsa, Nigeria
- Organized by: Africa Film Academy

Highlights
- Best Film: Of Good Report
- Most awards: Of Good Report (5)
- Most nominations: Of Good Report (13)

Television coverage
- Network: Channels TV; AIT

The 10th Africa Movie Academy Awards ceremony honouring movies of 2013 was scheduled to take place in Yenagoa, Bayelsa State on 26 April 2014, but was shifted to 24 May 2014. The nomination party was held at Emperor Palace, Johannesburg, South Africa on 2 April 2014.

== Winners and nominees ==
Entries were open for the award in December 2013 and closed on 15 January 2014, the films for submission must have been produced, premiered and/or released between May 2012 and December 2013. Over 500 films were submitted for the awards from 40 countries across the world; the nomination process involved five stages before the best 30 films were shortlisted for nomination. Before this edition, there used to be a ten-man jury to determine the nominees but it has been increased to fifteen.

The nominees for the 10th Africa Movie Academy Awards were announced on 2 April 2014 at Emperor Palace, Johannesburg, South Africa, the main event which was initially scheduled to be held on 26 April 2014 has been shifted to 24 May 2014 and will be held at Gabriel Okara Cultural Centre, Yenagoa, Bayelsa, Nigeria. This is the first time the award will be held in May as previous ceremonies had always been held in the month of April. Of Good Report received the most nominations with 13; The Forgotten Kingdom and Potomanto came in second with 9.

Danny Glover presented the Best Film award to the film Of Good Report. The AMAA winners for 2014 will be part of AFA's cinema project in East Africa.

=== Awards ===
Best Film	Best Director
Of Good Report (South Africa); Children of Troumaron (Mauritius); Potomanto (Ghana); The Forgotten Kingdom (South Africa); Accident (Nigeria)	Jamil X.T Quebeka – Of Good Report (South Africa); Harrikrishna & Sharvan Anenden - Children of Troumaron (Mauritius); Shirley Frimpong-Manso – Potomanto (Ghana); Andrew Mudge – The Forgotten Kingdom (South Africa); Teco Benson – Accident (Nigeria)
Best Actor in a leading role	Best Actress in a leading role
Mothusi Magano (Of Good Report); Zengo Ngqobe (Forgotten Kingdom); Kanayo O. Kanayo (Apaye); Joseph Benjamin (Murder at Prime Suites); Adjetey Anang (Potomanto); Majid Michel (Brother's Keeper)	Clarion Chukwura (Apaye); Uche Nnadili (B for Boy); Linda Sokhulu (Felix); Chioma Chukwuka Akpotha (Accident); Uche Jombo Rodriquez, Monalisa Chinda and Daniella Okeke (Lagos Cougars); Joselyn Dumas (A Northern Affair)
Best Actor in a supporting role	Best Actress in a supporting role
Thapelo Mofekeng (Felix); Desmond Elliot (Finding Mercy); Yomi Fash-Lanso (Omo Elemosho); Aniekan Iyoho (Potomanto); Tshamano Sebe (Of Good Report)	Patience Ozokwor (After the Proposal); Vinaya Sungkur (The Children of Troumaron); Marie Humbert (Potomanto); Barbara Soky (Brother's Keeper); Lee-Ann van Rooi (Of Good Report)
Best Young/Promising Actor	Best Child Actor
Petronella Tshuma (Of Good Report); Evelyn Galle Ansah (Good Old Days: For the Love of AA); Tope Tedela (A Mile from Home); Kitty Phillips (The Children of Troumatron); Shawn Faqua (Lagos Cougars)	Lebohang Ntsane (Forgotten Kingdom); Tobe Oboli (Brothers Keeper); Hlayani Junior Mabasa (Felix)
Best First Feature Film by a Director	Bayelsa State Government Endowed Award for Best Nigerian Film
Harrikrishna & Sharvan Anenden (The Children of Troumaron); Roberta Durrant (Felix); Chika Anadu (B for Boy); Andrew Mudge (Forgotten Kingdom); Dilman Dila (Felista’s Fable); Joyce Mhango Chavula (No More Tears)	Accident; Apaye; B for Boy; Murder at Prime Suites; Omo Elemosho
Best Diaspora Feature Film	Best Diaspora Documentary
Kingston Paradise (Jamaica); Tula The Revolt (Curaçao); AZU (Venezuela); Retrieval (USA)	Through a Lens Darkly: Black Photographers and the Emergence of a People (USA); Finding Samuel Lowe: From Harlem to China – (USA/CANADA); Freedom Summer (USA); No Bois Man, No Frad (Trinidad and Tobago)
Ousmane Sembene Award for Best Film in An African Language	Best Documentary
B for Boy (Nigeria); The Forgotten Kingdom – South Africa; Omo Elemosho (Nigeria); Onye Ozi (Nigeria); Ni Sisi (Kenya)	Hamu Beya- The Sand Fishers (Mali) (co-winner); Portrait of a Lone Farmer (Nigeria/Denmark) (co-winner); Kushaya Ingagasi (South Africa); Daughters of the Niger Delta (Nigeria); Sincerely Ethiopia (Ethiopia)
Best Diaspora Short film	Efere Ozako Award for Best Short film
Passage (Bahamas); Heaven (USA); Tickle Me Rich (Trinidad and Tobago); Red (USA)	Dialemi (Gabon); Haunted Soul (Kenya); Siriya Mtungi (Tanzania); New Horizon (Nigeria); Nandy l’orpheline (Mali); Living Funeral (Nigeria); Phindile’s Heart (South Africa)
Best Animation	Achievement in Screenplay
Khumba (South Africa); The Hare and the Lion (Burkina Faso); Thank God its Friday (Morocco); Leila (Nigeria); The Brats and Toy Thief (Mozambique)	Of Good Report; B for Boy; Accident; Potomanto; Felix
Achievement in Editing	Achievement in Cinematography
Potomanto; Of Good Report; Accident; Once Upon A Road Trip; Felix	The Forgotten Kingdom; Once Upon A Road Trip; Good Old Days: Love of AA; Of Good Report; The Children of Troumaron
Achievement in Sound	Achievement in Visual Effects
The Forgotten Kingdom; Felix; A Northern Affair; Nothing For Mahala; Of Good Report	A Mile from Home; Omo Elemosho (Nigeria); Secret Room (Nigeria); Ni Sisi (Kenya); Of Good Report (South Africa)
Achievement in Soundtrack	Achievement in Makeup
Onye Ozi (Nigeria); Once Upon A Road Trip; Felix; Of Good Report (South Africa); Potomanto (Ghana)	Once Upon A Road Trip (South Africa); A Mile from Home (Nigeria); Apaye (Nigeria); Felista Fable (Uganda); Potomanto (Ghana)
Achievement In Costume Design	Achievement In Production Design
Ni Sisi (Kenya); Good Old Days: Love of AA (Ghana); Apaye (Nigeria); Omo Elemosho (Nigeria); The Forgotten Kingdom (South Africa)	A Northern Affair (Ghana); Of Good Report (South Africa); Ni Sisi (Kenya); Good Old Days: Love of AA (Ghana); Apaye (Nigeria)

=== Special awards ===
- Madiba Award: Ni Sisi (Kenya)
- Best Film for Women Empowerment: B for Boy (Nigeria)
- Special Jury Award: New Horizon (Nigeria)
- Lifetime Achievement: Bob-Manuel Udokwu

==== Multiple nominations ====
- 13 Nominations
- Of Good Report

9 Nominations

- The Forgotten Kingdom
- Potomanto

8 Nominations

- Felix

6 Nominations

- Apaye
- Accident
- The Children of Troumaron

5 Nominations

- B for Boy
- Omo Elemosho

4 Nominations

- Good Old Days: Love of AA
- Once Upon A Road Trip
- Ni Sisi

== Ceremony information ==
Since the 9th Edition of the awards, there has been subaudible public uproar regarding the host country of the 10th landmark ceremony as it was rumoured that South Africa has been bidding to host the event for quite sometime. AMAA officials didn't issue any statement on the rumours until December 2013 when the founder, Peace Anyiam Osigwe came out at a Lagos press briefing on 19 December 2013 and stated "you will hear from me on January 1". It was later revealed that both South Africa and Malawi have been bidding to host the event, but Osigwe stated that it was turned down as it would be difficult to tell the Nigerian people that the 10th AMAA ceremony will be held outside Nigeria.

Lydia Forson and Kunle Afolayan was selected as the year's Face of AMAA. According to Osigwe, the two were chosen because they understand what AMAA stands for and its visions. As AMAA Ambassadors, they will be travelling around the world to carry out various activities for a period of one year.

=== Renamed and discontinued categories ===
To mark the 10th edition of the award ceremony, some changes have been employed in the AMAA categories; Nelson Mandela Madiba Africa Vision Awards has been introduced to be received by any film that captures vision of the category. Best Film in African Language was renamed to Sembene Ousmane Awards for Best Film in African Language while the Best Short Film Award category is now called Efere Ozako Award for Best Short Film. This development is to immortalize some exceptional African great men who have contributed to the growth and development of the film industry. The category Best Film by African Living Abroad has been cancelled while a new category Best Director First Feature Film has been introduced to encourage young and upcoming film directors.

=== People's Choice Awards ===
People's Choice Awards (PCA) system was announced in December 2013; This will allow the public to vote for their bests from past winners in all the categories. This is different from the regular jury-based categories and will be awarded separately. Voters will have opportunity to win prizes ranging from phones, iPads and a car. AMAA@10 has also made available a $10,000 reward for three Journalists who can give the best three reports on AMAA in the last nine years. the first prize gets $5,000, while the second and third prize get $3,000 and $2,000 respectively. Winners would be determined through the depth and accuracy of the report, how well they understand the AMAA brand and the style of writing.

== See also ==
- List of Africa Movie Academy Awards ceremonies
