= 17th Africa Movie Academy Awards =

2021 film awards ceremony

- Date: 28 November 2021
- Site: Mariott Hotel, Lagos

Highlights
- Best Film: The Gravedigger's Wife (Somalia)
- Most awards: The Gravedigger's Wife (Somalia) - 4 Awards
- Most nominations: The Gravedigger's Wife (Somalia)

The 2021 African Movie Academy Award ceremony was held on Sunday 28 November 2021 at the Marriott Hotel in Lagos Nigeria.

Submissions for consideration for the awards were held between 31 May and 31 July 2021. Over 500 films were submitted for consideration.

The nominees in 26 categories were announced in a ceremony held at Ebony Life Place, Victoria Island Lagos, on Friday 29 October 2021 by the head of the jury, Steve Oluseyi Ayorinde. The Somali movie, Gravedigger’s Wife received the highest number of nominations including Best Film in African Language, Best Actor in a Leading Role, and Best Director. Other nominated films include Omo Ghetto: The Saga, Ayinla and Eyimofe. Oluwabamike Olawunmi-Adenibuyan, a former housemate in Big Brother Naija was nominated in the Best Young/Promising Actor category for her role in the movie Collision Course.

== Awards ==
Best Film	Best Director
The Gravedigger's Wife (Somalia) - Winner; Mission to Rescue (Kenya); Fried Barry (South Africa); Stain (Uganda); Eyimofe (Nigeria); Hairareb (Namibia); Nyara: The Kidnapping (Tanzania); Black Medusa (Tunisia)	Chuko&Ayie Esiri, Eyimofe - Winner; Gilbert Lukalia, Mission to Rescue; Ryan Kruger, Fried Barry; Khadar Ahmed, The Gravedigger's Wife; Morris Mugisha, Stain; Oshoveli Shipoh, Hairareb; Ram Ally Kasongo, Nyara/The Kidnapping; Youssef Chebbi& Ismael, Black Medusa
Best Actor in a Leading Role	Best Actress in a Leading Role
Omar Abdi, The Gravedigger's Wife - Winner; Gary Green – Fried Barry; Lateef Adedimeji, Ayinla; Melvin Alusa, Mission to Rescue; Jude Akuwudike, Eyimofe; David Njavera, Hairareb; Nonso Bassey, La Femme Anjola	Joan Agaba, Stain - Winner; Lucie Memba Bois, Buried; Funke Akindele, Omo Ghetto: The Saga; Sarah Alina Grosz, Black Medusa; Phumi Mthembu, African America; Rita Dominic, La Femme Anjola; Claudine de Groot, Hairareb
Best Actor in a Supporting Role	Best Actress in a Supporting Role
Kelechi Udegbe, Collision Course - Winner; Mulshid Mugabire, Monica; Mehdi Hajri, Black Medusa; Cameron Scott, Hotel on the Koppies; Bimbo Manuel, Gone	Hazel Hinda, Hairareb - Winner; Gloria Anozie-Young, Rattlesnake: The Ahanna Story; Naana Hayford, Chasing Lullaby; Tumi Morake, Seriously Single; Ini Edo, The Citation
Achievement in Costume Design	Achievement in Makeup
African America - Winner; Buried; Oba Bi Olorun; Tecora; Eagle Wings	The Gravedigger's Wife - Winner; Fried Barry; Tecora; The Takers; Mission to Rescue
Achievement in Cinematography	Achievement in Production Design
Ayinla - Winner; Black Medusa; Stain; Nyara (The Kidnapping); The Gravedigger's Wife	The Gravedigger's Wife - Winner; Tecora; The Takers; Nyara (The Kidnapping); Shadow Parties
Achievement in Editing	Achievement in Screenplay
Eyimofe - Winner; Mission to Rescue; Omo Ghetto: The Saga; Nyala (The Kidnapping); Fried Barry	Collision Course - Winner; Chasing Lullaby; Where I Come From; Stain; Hairareb
Best Film in An African Language	Best Nigerian Film
The Gravedigger's Wife – Khadar Ahmed (Somalia) - Winner; Bangarang – Robin Odongo (Kenya); Ayinla – Tunde Kelani (Nigeria); Hotel on the Koppies – Charlie Vundler (South Africa); Nyara – Ram Ally Kasongo (Tanzania); Stain – Morris Mugisha (Uganda)	Eyimofe - Winner; Rattlesnake: The Ahanna Story; Ayinla; The Citation; Omo Ghetto: The Saga; La Femme Anjola; Collision Course; Shadow Parties
Best Short Film	Best Animation
Meat – Uganda - Winner; Enroute – Bourkina Fasso; A Better Friend – Ghana; Find Me By The River – South Africa; In Extremis – DRC; Portrait of Princess Tutu – Côte d'Ivoire; The Long Night in Abuja – Nigeria	Lady Buckit and the Motley Mopsters – Nigeria - Winner; Room 5 – Ghana; Shaka-Inklosi Yamakhosi – South Africa; The Pyramid – Egypt; Mofiala – Togo; A Thousand Fate – Uganda; White Nights – Algeria
Best Documentary	Best Film by an African Living Abroad
Softie - Kenya - Winner; The Sacred Woods - Tunisia; Postcard - Morocco; Unmasked: Leadership, Trust & the Pandemic - Nigeria; Linda Under Lockdown - South Africa; Bulembu: History of a Culture - DRC; Noboth - Uganda; Zindet - Niger	Blackmail – Obi Emelonye (Nigeria/UK) - Winner; First Call – Angela Onuora (Nigeria/Canada); K.I.A.B – Eric Zoa and Oleksii Osyka (Cameroon/USA); Gone – Daniel Ademinokan (Nigeria/US)
Best Diaspora Short Film	Best Diaspora Documentary
Three Leaves (Haiti) - Winner; In Other News (Canada); Blue (US); The Berne Identity (Switzerland); No Comprendo (UK)	African Redemption: the Life of Marcus Garvey (US) - Winner; Akwaaba – The Awakening (US); Race Today Documentary (UK)
Best Diaspora Feature	Best Soundtrack
Residue (US) - Winner; Ride Share (US); Hal King (US)	The Citation - Winner; Nyara (The Kidnapper); The Gravedigger's Wife; This Lady Called Life; Hotel on the Koppies
Best Visual Effects	Best Sound
Fried Barry - Winner; Nneka the Pretty Serpent; Stain; The Takers; Mission to Rescue	Eyimofe - Winner; Hairareb; African America; The Gravedigger's Wife; La Femme Anjola
Most Promising Actor	Best First Feature Film by a Director
Wilmah Muremera – Shaina - Winner; Oluwabamike Olawunmi-Adenibuyan – Collision Course; Faith Fidel – Where I Come From; David Weda – Bangarang; Bertha Abdallah – Nyara (The Kidnapping); Hannah Sukali – Fatsani: A Tale Of Survival	Eyimofe – Chuko&AyieEsiri (Nigeria) - Winner; Shaina – Beatrice Masvaure Alf (Zimbabwe); African America – MuziMthembu (South Africa); The Gravedigger's Wife – Khadar Ahmed (Somalia); Black Medusa – Youssef Chebbi& Ismael (Tunisia); Fried Barry – Ryan Kruger (South Africa)
