= Africa Movie Academy Award for Best Short Film =

The Africa Movie Academy Award for Best Short Film, officially known as Efere Ozako Award for Best Short Film, is an annual merit by the Africa Film Academy to reward the best short films for the year. It was introduced in the 4th Africa Movie Academy Awards, but no film was rewarded because the jury didn't deem any of the nominees fit for the award. No submitted film was nominated for the award in 2009. At the 10th Africa Movie Academy Awards, the award category was renamed to honor the memory of renowned entertainment lawyer Efere Ozako.

== Winners and nominees ==
Best Short Film
Year	Film	Recipient	Result
2010	The Abyss Boys		Won
2010	Mahala		Nominated
2010	The Painter		Nominated
2010	Suara La		Nominated
2011	Dina	Mickey Fonseca	Won
2011	Bougfen	Petra Baninla Sunjo	Nominated
2011	Weakness	Wanjiru Kairu	Nominated
2011	No Jersey No Match	Daniel Ademinokan	Nominated
2011	Duty	Mak Kusare	Nominated
2011	Bonlambo	Zwe Lesizwe Ntuli	Nominated
2011	Zebu And The Photofish	Zipporah Nyarori	Nominated
2011	Allahkabo	Bouna Cherif Fofana	Nominated
2012	Braids on a Bald Head	Ishaya Bako	Won
2012	Jamaa		Nominated
2012	Look Again		Nominated
2012	Maffe Tiga		Nominated
2012	Hidden Life		Nominated
2012	Mwansa The Great		Nominated
2012	Chumo	Jordan Riber	Nominated
2012	The Young Smoker	Tope Oshin	Nominated
2013	Kwaku Ananse		Won
2013	Dead River		Nominated
2013	Elegy For A Revolutionary		Nominated
2013	Yellow Fever		Nominated
2013	Nhamo		Nominated
2013	Big Daddy		Nominated
2013	Release		Nominated
2013	Burnt Forest		Nominated
2014	Dialemi		Won
2014	Haunted Soul		Nominated
2014	Siriya Mtungi		Nominated
2014	New Horizon	Tope Oshin	Nominated
2014	Nandy l’orpheline		Nominated
2014	Living Funeral		Nominated
2014	Phindile’s Heart		Nominated
2015	Twaaga		Won
2015	Stories of Our Lives		Nominated
2015	Aisha’s Story		Nominated
2015	Gulped of the Blue Sea		Nominated
2015	Memoir of a Honest Voice		Nominated
2016	Meet The Parents		Won
2016	Encounter		Nominated
2016	Le Chemin		Nominated
2016	Blood Taxi		Nominated
2016	Nourah The Holy Light		Nominated
2016	Ireti		Nominated
2016	Life of Nigerian couple		Nominated
2017	A Place for Myself – co-winner		Won
2017	A Place in the Plane – co-winner		Won
2017	Bout		Nominated
2017	On Monday Last Week		Nominated
2017	Silence		Nominated
2017	Kieza		Nominated
2017	Yemoja: Rise of the Orisa		Nominated
2017	Marabout		Nominated
2018	Tikitat Soulima		Won
2018	Dem Dem		Nominated
2018	Zenith		Nominated
2018	It Rains on Ouga		Nominated
2018	In Shadows		Nominated
2018	Coat of Harm		Nominated
2018	Nice, Very Nice		Nominated
2018	Visions (Shaitan, Buruja, Brood)		Nominated
2018	Fallou		Nominated
2018	Still Water Runs Deep		Nominated
2019	A Tune of Kora		Won
2019	The Fisherman		Nominated
2019	ICYASHA		Nominated
2019	Mma Moeketsi		Nominated
2019	NAMOW2018		Nominated
2019	Vagabond		Nominated
2019	Measure of a Woman		Nominated
2019	Motswakwa		Nominated
2019	Tonight’s Opening Act		Nominated
2019	Hello Rain		Nominated
2020	The Letter Reader		Won
2020	Baxu & the Giant		Nominated
2020	Songs About My Mother		Nominated
2020	Idi Amin’s Boat		Nominated
2020	Yahoo		Nominated
2020	SEMA (Speak Out)		Nominated
2020	A Canvas for a Visa		Nominated
2020	After the War		Nominated
2021	Meat		Won
2021	Enroute		Nominated
2021	A Better Friend		Nominated
2021	Find Me By The River		Nominated
2021	In Extremis		Nominated
2021	Portrait of Princess Tutu		Nominated
2021	The Long Night In Abuja		Nominated
2022	A Lisbon Affair	Hoji Fortuna	Won
2022	Al-Sit	Suzannah Mirghani	Nominated
