= Africa Movie Academy Award for Best Actor in a Supporting Role =

African film award

The Africa Movie Academy Award for Best Actor in a Supporting role is an annual merit by the Africa Film Academy to recognize and reward actors in a supporting role in a film.

Best Actor (Supporting Role)
Year	Actor	Film	Result
2005	Sam Dede	The Mayors	Won
2006	Justus Esiri	Rising Moon	Won
2006	Desmond Elliot	Behind Closed Door	Nominated
2006	Emeka Enyiocha	Family Battle	Nominated
2006	Arnold Chirisa	Tanyaradzwa	Nominated
2006	Kofi Adjorlolo	My Mother’s Heart	Nominated
2006	Henry Legema	Anini	Nominated
2007	Bruno Iwuoha	Sins of the Flesh	Won
2007	Obi Okoli	Explosion	Nominated
2007	Yinka Quadri	Abeni	Nominated
2007	Fred Amata	The Amazing Grace	Nominated
2008	Emeka Ossai	Check Point	Won
2008	Jibril Hoomsuk	White Waters	Nominated
2008	Fritz Bafour	Return Of Beyonce	Nominated
2008	Chiwetalu Agu	Across the Niger	Nominated
2008	Ofia Afuluagu Mbaka	New Jerusalem	Nominated
2009	Joel Okuyo Atiku	Battle of the Soul	Won
2009	Femi Adebayo	Apaadi	Nominated
2009	Abubakar Mvenda & Ken Ambani	From a Whisper	Nominated
2009	Neil Mc Carthy	Gugu and Andile	Nominated
2009	Yemi Blaq	Grey Focus	Nominated
2010	Adjetey Anang	The Perfect Picture	Won
2010	Godwin Kotey	I Sing of a Well	Nominated
2010	Francis Duru	Nnenda	Nominated
2010	Yemi Blaq	High Blood Pressure	Nominated
2011	Hoji Fortuna	Viva Riva!	Won
2011	Osita Iheme	Mirror Boy	Nominated
2011	Mpilo Vusi Kunene	A Small Town Called Descent	Nominated
2011	John Dumelo	A Private Storm	Nominated
2011	Desmond Dube	Hopeville	Nominated
2012	Fana Mokoena	Man On Ground	Won
2012	Rapulana Seiphemo	How to Steal 2 Million	Nominated
2012	Hafiz Oyetoro	Phone Swap	Nominated
2012	Okey Uzoeshi	Two Brides And A Baby	Nominated
2012	Godfrey Theobejane	48	Nominated
2012	Lwanda Jawar	Rugged Priest	Nominated
2013	Gabriel Afolayan	Hoodrush	Won
2013	Ali Nuhu	Blood And Henna	Nominated
2013	Olwenya Maina	Nairobi Half Life	Nominated
2013	Alfred Atungu	The Twin Sword	Nominated
2013	Ikponmwosa Gold	Confusion Na Wa	Nominated
2014	Thapelo Mofekeng	Felix	Won
2014	Desmond Elliot	Finding Mercy	Nominated
2014	Yomi Fash-Lanso	Omo Elemosho	Nominated
2014	Aniekan Iyoho	Potomanto	Nominated
2014	Tshamano Sebe	Of Good Report	Nominated
2015	Samson Tadese	Triangle Going to America	Won
2015	Israel Makoe	iNumber Number	Nominated
2015	Paul Obazele	Iyore	Nominated
2015	Chumani Pan	Silver Rain	Nominated
2015	OC Ukeje	Love or Something Like That	Nominated
2016	Abidine Dioari	Eye of the Storm	Won
2016	Joseph Otsiman	The Cursed Ones	Nominated
2016	Uti Nwachukwu	Breathless	Nominated
2016	Adeolu Adekola	Taxi Driver: Oko Ashewo	Nominated
2016	Kenneth Nkosi	Ayanda	Nominated
2016	Thomas Gumede	Tell Me Sweet Something	Nominated
2017	Papi Mpaka	Félicité	Won
2017	Adonijah Owiriwa	76	Nominated
2017	Warren Matsimola	Vaya	Nominated
2017	Olu Jacobs	Oloibiri	Nominated
2017	Richard Seruwazi	While We Live	Nominated
2017	Majid Michel	Slow Country	Nominated
2018	Gideon Okeke	Cross Roads	Won
2018	Seun Ajayi	Ojukokoro	Nominated
2018	Lionel Newton	Pop Lock ‘N’ Roll	Nominated
2018	Akah Nnani	Banana Island Ghost	Nominated
2018	Richard Lukunku	Lucky Specials	Nominated
2019	Jarrid Geduld	Ellen: The Ellen Pakkies Story	Won
2019	Reminisce	King of Boys	Nominated
2019	Zolisa Xaluva	Sew the Winter to My Skin	Nominated
2019	Akah Nnani	Banana Island Ghost	Nominated
2019	Kanayo O. Kanayo	Up North	Nominated
2019	Kobina Amissah-Sam	The Burial of Kojo	Nominated
2019	Bucci Franklin	Knockout Blessing	Nominated
2020	Ramsey Nouah Jnr	Living in Bondage: Breaking Free	Won
2020	Arabrun Nyyeneque	40 Sticks	Nominated
2020	Adjatey Annang	Gold Coast Lounge	Nominated
2020	Narcissus Afeli	Desrances	Nominated
2020	Cosson Chinepoh	The Fisherman’s Diary	Nominated
2021	Kelechi Udegbe	Collision Course	Won
2021	Mulshid Mugabire	Monica	Nominated
2021	Mehdi Hajri	Black Medusa	Nominated
2021	Cameron Scott	Hotel on the Koppies	Nominated
2021	Bimbo Manuel	Gone	Nominated
2022	Adjetey Anang	Borga	Won
2022	Aphiwe Mkefe	Surviving Gaza	Nominated
2022	Wale Ojo	A Song from the Dark	Nominated
2022	Tshamano Sebe	Angeliene	Nominated
2022	Toyin Osinaike	Jolly Roger	Nominated
2022	Segun Arinze	Almajiri	Nominated
2022	Josh2Funny	Money Miss Road	Nominated
2023	Jimmy Jean-Louis	Rise	Won
2023	Francis Onwochei	The Trade	Nominated
2023	Jeff Jackson Morgianho	Four Walls	Nominated
2023	Hakeem Kae-Kazim	Fight Like a Girl	Nominated
2024	Sandile Mahlangu	The Queenstown Kings	Nominated
2024	Ochungo Benson	Nawi	Nominated
2024	Keppy Ekpeyong Bassey	The Weekend	Nominated
2024	Ikechukwu Onunaku	This is Lagos	Nominated
2024	Lucky Ejim	Orah	Nominated
2024	Solomon Fixon Owoo	Letters to Goddo	Nominated
2024	Femi Adebayo	Jagun Jagun	Won
