= Hear Me Move =

- Directed by: Scotness L. Smith
- Written by: Fidel Namisi
- Produced by: Fidel Namisi; Wandile Molebatsi; Scottnes Smith
- Starring: Nyaniso Dzedze; Wandile Molebatsi; Makhaola Ndebele; Khanyi Mbau; Mbuso Kgarebe
- Cinematography: Justus de Jager
- Edited by: C.A. van Aswegen
- Music by: Zethu Mashika
- Production company: Coal Stove Pictures
- Distributed by: Ster-Kinekor Distribution
- Release dates: 19 July 2014 (Durban International Film Festival); 27 February 2015 (South Africa)
- Running time: 103 minutes
- Country: South Africa
- Language: English

Hear Me Move is the first South African "Sbujwa" dance film which was released in 2015 on Ster-Kinekor Cinemas and internationally.

== Plot ==
Muzi, born and raised in Johannesburg, South Africa, is the son of a famous street dancer who is in pursuit to find the truth about his father's death. He teams up with his father's dance partner "Shoes", who encourages him to take heed of his dance talent, but finds himself in a challenge that pushes him to his limits.

Following on his father's footsteps, Muzi is a street dancer. He struggles to keep his promise to his mother of not dancing again following the death of his father. He finds himself in a dilemma of finding the truth about his father's death or disappoint his mother by joining Shoe's dance crew to continue dancing. Eventually he joins the dance crew, a culprit action that leads him to become an enemy of "Prince", the crew leader of a new dance crew that is making waves in the city.

== Cast ==
- Nyaniso Dzedze as Muzi
- Wandile Molebatsi as Thami Skhulu
- Makhaola Ndebele as Shoes
- Amanda Du-Pont
- Boity Thulo
- Khanyi Mbau
- Lillian Dube as Gogo
- Patrick Lefty Mbenege as Spikiri
- Tumelo Seleke as T Boz
- Anele Vilana as Arnold
- Bontle Modiselle as Khanyi
- Mbuso Kgarebe as Prince
- Seitatolo Lydimatthew Sefafe as Pinky
- Bongani Skosana as Ora

== Production ==
The film was directed by Scottnes L. Smith and produced by Fidel Namisi and Wandile Molebatsi. Fidel Namisi wrote the screenplay and Zethu Mashika composed the score. It was produced in Johannesburg by Coal Stove Pictures.

== Release ==
The film was released nationwide in South Africa on 27 February 2015 at Ster-Kinekor Cinemas. The film also had international screening via Afrostream network in different countries including the United States.

== Reception ==
Hear Me Move was well received with more positive comments from film reviews. It received 5 nominations at the 12th Africa Movie Academy Awards, including awards for Most Promising Actor, Best Supporting Actress, Best Soundtrack, Best Editing and Best Visual Effects. It was the recipient of the Kalasha Award for Best Original Score in 2015.

== Box office ==
Hear Me Move is reported to have Box Office Gross of US§ 43,000 as of 15 March 2015.
