= The Milkmaid (film) =

2020 film

- Film poster
- Directed by: Desmond Ovbiagele
- Written by: Desmond Ovbiagele
- Produced by: Desmond Ovbiagele
- Starring: Anthonieta Kalunta; Maryam Booth; Gambo Usman Kona; Patience Okpala; Ibrahim Jammal; Umar Magaji; Nasiru Mus; Abubakar Mohammed, Faruq Usma Kona, Abubakar Mohammed
- Cinematography: Yinka Edward
- Edited by: Chuka Ejorh
- Production company: Danono Media
- Release date: 27 November 2020
- Running time: 136 minutes
- Country: Nigeria
- Language: Hausa

The Milkmaid is a 2020 Nigerian drama film directed and written by Desmond Ovbiagele. It was selected as the Nigerian entry for the Best International Feature Film at the 93rd Academy Awards, but it was not nominated. The film stars Anthonieta Kalunta, Gambo Usman Kona, and Maryam Booth.

== Plot ==
A Fulani milkmaid confronts religious extremists in remote parts of Sub-Saharan Africa while searching for her missing sister, but her efforts to reclaim her disrupted past prove futile.

== Cast ==
- Anthonieta kalunta as Aisha
- Maryam Booth as Zainab
- Gambo Usman Kona as Dangana
- Patience Okpala as Hauwa
- Ibrahim Jammal as Haruna
- Umar Magaji as Garba
- Nasiru Mus as Mallam Farooq
- Gambo Usman Kona as Dangana
- Faruq Usma Kona as Tanko
- Abubakar Mohammed as Abu Nasiru

== Reception ==
The Milkmaid was listed as one of the top 20 Nigerian films of 2020. It won Best Film in an African Language and was nominated for eight awards.

== Accolades ==
At the 16th African Movie Academy Awards, the film was nominated for eight awards, ultimately winning Best Film, Best Film in an African Language, Best Actress in a Supporting Role, Best Makeup, and Best Nigerian Film. The Milkmaid also won the Narrative Feature Award at the 2021 Pan African Film Festival in Los Angeles.

=== Awards and nominations ===
Year	Award	Category	Recipient	Result	Ref
2020	Africa Movie Academy Awards	Best Film	The Milkmaid	Won	
2020	Africa Movie Academy Awards	Best Film in an African Language	The Milkmaid	Won	
2020	Africa Movie Academy Awards	Best Actress in a Supporting Role	Maryam Booth	Won	
2020	Africa Movie Academy Awards	Best Makeup	The Milkmaid	Won	
2020	Africa Movie Academy Awards	Best Nigerian Film	The Milkmaid	Won	
2020	Africa Movie Academy Awards	Best Director	Desmond Obviagele	Nominated	
2020	Africa Movie Academy Awards	Achievement in Cinematography	The Milkmaid	Nominated	
2020	Africa Movie Academy Awards	Most Promising Actor	Anthonieta Kalunta	Nominated	
2021	Best of Nollywood Awards	Best Actor in a Lead role (Hausa)	Gambo Usman Kona	Nominated	
2021	Best of Nollywood Awards	Best Actress in a Lead role (Hausa)	Anthonieta Kalunta	Nominated	
2021	Best of Nollywood Awards	Most Promising Actress	Anthonieta Kalunta	Won	
2021	Best of Nollywood Awards	Movie with the Best Sound	The Milkmaid	Nominated	
2021	Best of Nollywood Awards	Movie with the Best Special Effect	The Milkmaid	Nominated	
2021	Best of Nollywood Awards	Movie with the Best Screenplay	The Milkmaid	Nominated	
2021	Best of Nollywood Awards	Movie with the Best Editing	The Milkmaid	Won	
2021	Best of Nollywood Awards	Movie with the Best Cinematography	The Milkmaid	Won	
2021	Best of Nollywood Awards	Best Use of Costume in a Movie	The Milkmaid	Nominated	
2021	Best of Nollywood Awards	Best Use of Make up in a Movie	The Milkmaid	Nominated	
2021	Best of Nollywood Awards	Movie of the Year	The Milkmaid	Won	
2021	Best of Nollywood Awards	Director of the Year	Desmond Obviagele	Won	
2021	Best of Nollywood Awards	Movie with the Best Production Design	The Milkmaid	Nominated	
2021	Best of Nollywood Awards	Movie with the Best Soundtrack	The Milkmaid	Nominated	

== See also ==
- List of submissions to the 93rd Academy Awards for Best International Feature Film
- List of Nigerian submissions for the Academy Award for Best International Feature Film
