= Nyaniso Dzedze =

South African actor and singer

- Born: Nyaniso Ntsikelelo Dzedze; 13 September 1988 (age 38); South Africa
- Occupations: dancer; choreographer; actor; singer
- Known for: Ashes to Ashes

Nyaniso Ntsikelelo Dzedze (born 13 September 1988) is a South African performing artist, actor, dancer, choreographer, and singer. He is best known for his lead role as adult Simba in Beyoncé's Disney release Black Is King.

Born in 1986 and raised in Johannesburg, his South African television debut was with his role as Tsietsi Namane on e.tv soapie Ashes to Ashes.

He was also recognized for his lead role as Muzi in Hear Me Move - South Africa's first dance movie.

He received a nomination for Most Promising Actor at the 12th Africa Movie Academy Awards in Port Harcourt, Nigeria.

His wife Yana Fay Dzedze is British. They have one child together.

== Filmography ==
=== Television and film ===
- Ashes to Ashes
- Generations
- Hear Me Move
- Black Is King
- Binnelanders
- Rhythm City
- Durban Gen
- Soon Comes Night (Netflix)
- Skeem Saam
