= Desrances =

2019 Burkinabé film

- Directed by: Apolline Traoré
- Written by: Apolline Traoré
- Produced by: Denis Cougnaud
- Starring: Jimmy Jean-Louis; Jemima Naomi Nemlin
- Cinematography: Ali Lakrouf
- Edited by: Sylvie Gadmer
- Music by: Cyril Morin
- Release date: 23 February 2019
- Running time: 105 minutes
- Country: Burkina Faso
- Language: French

Desrances is a 2019 Burkinabé drama thriller film directed by Apolline Traoré and produced by Denis Cougnaud. It stars Jimmy Jean-Louis and Jemima Naomi Nemlin with Evelyne Ily and Mike Danon in supporting roles. The film was shot at Haiti.

The film set during the 2010-11 post-election violence in Ivory Coast and centered around the courage of a 12-year-old girl. The film premiered at the Panafrican Film and Television Festival of Ouagadougou (Fespaco). The film was also nominated for the Best Actor In Leading Role at Africa Movie Academy Awards.

== Cast ==
- Jimmy Jean-Louis as Francis Desrances
- Jemima Naomi Nemlin as Haila
- Evelyne Ily
- Mike Danon
- Narcisse Afeti
- Tiekoumba Dosso
- Missa Ndri
- Delphine Ouattara
- Bienvenue Neba
- Toty Djah

== Awards and nominations ==
Year	Award	Category	Recipient	Result	Ref
2020	African Movie Academy Awards	Best Film	Desrances	Nominated	
2020	African Movie Academy Awards	Best Director	Appoline Traore	Nominated	
2020	African Movie Academy Awards	Best Actor in a Leading Role	Jimmy Jean-Louis	Won	
2020	African Movie Academy Awards	Best Actor in a Supporting Role	Narcisse Afeti	Nominated	
2020	African Movie Academy Awards	Best Actress in a Supporting Role	Evelyne Juhen	Nominated	
2020	African Movie Academy Awards	Achievement in Cinematography	Desrances	Nominated	
2020	African Movie Academy Awards	Achievement in Editing	Desrances	Nominated	
2020	African Movie Academy Awards	Best Visual Effects	Desrances	Nominated	
2020	African Movie Academy Awards	Best Sound	Desrances	Nominated	
2020	African Movie Academy Awards	Most Promising Actor	Naomi Nemlin	Nominated	
