= The Marshal of Finland =

- The Marshal of Finland poster
- Directed by: Gilbert Lukalia
- Written by: Sam Kihiu; Erkko Lyytien; Anthony Nd'ungu; Teemu Nikki; Andronico Otieno; Ken Saan; Emma Taulo
- Produced by: Erkko Lyytinen
- Starring: Telley Savalas Otieno; Beatrice Wangui; Ruth maingi Jacky Vike
- Cinematography: Ng'ang'a Kirumburu
- Edited by: Stephen Kibunja; Margus Sikk
- Music by: Jean Sibelius
- Production companies: Filmistuudio Kalevipojad; Savane Productions; Yleisradio (YLE)
- Distributed by: Yleisradio (YLE)
- Release date: 28 September 2012 (Helsinki Film Festival)
- Running time: 50 min
- Countries: Finland; Kenya; Estonia
- Language: English
- Budget: €20,000

The Marshal of Finland (Finnish: Suomen Marsalkka) is a Finnish-Kenyan fictional film based on the life of Marshal Carl Gustaf Emil Mannerheim. The film was produced by Yleisradio in cooperation with Savane Productions and Filmistuudio Kalevipojad. It was directed by a Kenyan, Gilbert Lukalia. The film's world premiere was at the Helsinki International Love & Anarchy Film Festival on 28 September 2012.

== Plot ==
The story of the film focuses on Gustaf Mannerheim's private life from 1905 to 1918. He was also known as Marshal of Finland, following his bravery in the army. He fought for the freedom of his country, which made him a true hero, and his people loved his ambition and success.

It tells us about an extraordinary man captured inside the great legend, who wanted an ordinary life full of love and peace. It is also about a failed marriage with Anastasia Arapova and a love affair with Kitty Linder after the Finnish Civil War. According to Gilbert Lukalian, "It's a universal story about a man who has difficulty reconciling family life and career."

== Cast ==
| Telley Savalas Otieno | as | Gustaf Mannerheim |
| Beatrice Wangui | as | Anastacia |
| Ruth Maingi | as | Maria |
| Jacky Vike | as | Kitty |
| Carl Muniafu | as | Young Gustaf |
| Mukami Njiru | as | Godmother |
| Betty Kathungu | as | Kitty's friend |
| Gitura Kamau | as | Priest |
| Gilbert Lukalia | as | Eliud |

== Crew ==
- Directed by: Gilbert Lukalia
- Screenplay by: Sam Kihiu Antony Ndung'u Teemu Nikki Andronico Otieno Emma Taulo
- Produced by: Erkko Lyytinen Ken Saan Krysteen Savane
- Cinematography: Kirumburu Ng'anga
- Edited by: Stephen Kibunja Margus Sikk
- Music by: Sten Sheripov
- Starring: Telley Savalas Otieno

== Production ==
In winter 2012 Yle reported on a forthcoming Mannerheim film, which would be an international production. Information about the film being filmed in a foreign country became to public, before Yle had time to organize a press conference on August 16, 2012.

Erkko Lyytinen got the idea for the film in Kenya from an Estonian producer, Ken Saan. Saan had asked Lyytinen if he had any project that could be filmed in Kenya. According to Lyytinen, Saan's aspect of the production was a major success of the movie filming. The screenplay was written by a Kenyan work group. Yle gave the scriptwriters the necessary facts, but the group created the portrait of Mannerheim themselves. Originally the film was going to be a war film but turned out to be a biographical film because it was too hard to shoot the war scenes in the bad circumstances.

The film was shot around Nairobi in May and June. Gilbert Lukalia was chosen to be a director of the film just 12 hours before the start of filming. They also made a six-part documentary of the making of the film called Operation Mannerheim, which cost about €100,000–150,000, even though the movie itself cost only €20,000.

== Reception ==
=== Stir before the premiere ===
The film sparked a debate even before it was published. The Finnish media raised a star about a black actor performing Mannerheim. Producer Markus Selin said that the film is "spoofing" and director Matti Kassila wondered why Yle had given a license for the description. Jörn Donner believed that the film is "a bluff" and said that Yle was trying to cash in on the Marshal's reputation.
