= Khadar Ayderus Ahmed =

Finnish-Somali director

- Born: Khadar Ayderus Ahmed; 10 January 1981 (age 45); Mogadishu, Somalia
- Occupations: Director, screenwriter
- Years active: 2008–present
- Known for: The Gravedigger's Wife (2021)

Khadar Ayderus Ahmed (born 10 January 1981), is a Finnish-Somali director and writer. He is best known for directing the feature film The Gravedigger's Wife (2021).

== Early life and education ==
Khadar Ayderus Ahmed was born on 10 January 1981 in Mogadishu, Somalia. At the age of 16, he moved to Finland as a refugee with his family.

== Career ==
In 2008, he wrote the script the award-winning short film Citizens, directed by Juho Kuosmanen, for which he also served as second assistant director.

In 2014, he directed his first short Me ei vietetä joulua, which received critical acclaim. He later directed two more shorts: Yövaras (2017) and The Killing of Cahceravga (2018).

In 2021, Ahmed directed his first feature film, The Gravedigger's Wife (Guled & Nasra). The film premiered in July 2021 in the Critics' Week section at the 74th Cannes Film Festival.

== Awards and nominations ==
The Gravedigger's Wife was nominated for the Critics' Week Grand Prize and Caméra d'Or at Cannes. It received wide critical acclaim and screened in multiple film festivals, including FESPACO where it won the Golden Stallion of Yennenga, the festival's top prize. The film was also nominated for the Grand-Prix Award under the International Competition at the Kyiv International Short Film Festival. He was also nominated for the Amplify Voices Award at the Toronto International Film Festival.

The film became the first Somali submission for the Academy Award for Best International Feature Film.

Year	Award	Category	Work	Result	Ref
2021	Africa Movie Academy Awards	Best Director	The Gravedigger's Wife	Nominated	
2021	Africa Movie Academy Awards	Best Film in An African Language	The Gravedigger's Wife	Won	
2021	Africa Movie Academy Awards	Best First Feature Film by a Director	The Gravedigger's Wife	Nominated	

== Filmography ==
Year	Film	Role	Genre	Ref.
2008	Citizens	Second assistant director, Writer	Short film	
2014	Me ei vietetä joulua	Director, writer	Short film	
2017	Unexpected Journey	Screenwriter, Story	Film	
2017	Yövaras	Director, writer	Short film	
2019	The Killing of Cahceravga	Director, writer	Short film	
2021	The Gravedigger's Wife	Director, writer	Film	
