= Linda Sibiya =

South African radio DJ

- Born: 17 July 1974 (age 52); EShowe, KwaZulu-Natal
- Occupations: Radio DJ, producer, entrepreneur and Broadcaster
- Years active: 1997-Present

Linda Sibiya is a South African radio DJ, entrepreneur and radio producer and television producer best known as a host on Ukhozi FM. Sibiya was born and raised in EShowe, North of KwaZulu-Natal. He made his acting debut in award-winning film Uhlanga the Mark.

== Filmography ==
- 2012 - Uhlanga the Mark
- 2024 - Uzalo
