= B for Boy =

2013 film by Chika Anadu

- Film poster
- Directed by: Chika Anadu
- Written by: Chika Anadu
- Produced by: Chika Anadu, Arie Esiri
- Starring: Uche Nwadili; Ngozi Nwaneto; Nonso Odogwu; Frances Okeke
- Cinematography: Monika Lenczewska
- Edited by: Simon Brasse
- Music by: Enis Rotthoff
- Production company: No Blondes Productions
- Release date: 13 October 2013 (London Film Festival)
- Running time: 114 minutes
- Country: Nigeria
- Language: Igbo

B for Boy is a 2013 Nigerian drama film directed by Chika Anadu and starring Uche Nwadili, Ngozi Nwaneto & Nonso Odogwu. It had its world premiere at the 2013 London Film Festival. It won the Best Film in an African Language award at the 10th Africa Movie Academy Awards. A debut film for Anadu, the film explores feminism and social issues facing Nigerian women.

== Plot ==
Amaka (Uche Nwadili) seems to be living a perfect life as an independent, modern Nigerian woman. She has a successful job, is in a happy marriage, has a loving daughter, and is pregnant. All seems well until her mother-in-law (Ngozi Nwaneto) tells Amaka that unless she has a boy, she will find a second wife for her son. While Amaka's husband (Nonso Odogwu) is away on a business trip, Amaka suffers a miscarriage but tells no one. With her due date fast approaching, Amaka goes to great lengths to illegally purchase a baby boy from another woman, Joy (Frances Okeke).

== Themes ==
There are two main themes explored in the film. One is the increasing struggle between traditional values and modern culture in Nigeria. The second is the injustices women face that is often perpetuated by other women.

== Reception ==
B for Boy has garnered critical and popular success internationally. In 2013 it premiered at the BFI London Film Festival in First Feature Competition, where it got a jury commendation and only lost out to Ilo Ilo, the film that had just won the Camera D'Or at the Cannes Film Festival that year. The film also won the Breakthrough Audience Award at the AFI (American Film Institute) film festival. At the Africa Movie Academy Awards, it won Best Film in an African Language

== See also ==
- List of Nigerian films of 2013
