= 1st Africa Movie Academy Awards =

2005 film awards ceremony

- Date: Saturday, 30 May 2005
- Site: Gloryland Cultural Center; Yenagoa, Bayelsa State, Nigeria
- Hosted by: Stella Damasus-Aboderin; Segun Arinze
- Organized by: Africa Film Academy

Highlights
- Best Picture: The Mayors

The 1st Africa Movie Academy Awards ceremony was held on 30 May 2005 at the Gloryland Cultural Center in Yenagoa, Bayelsa State, Nigeria, to honor the best African films of 2004. The ceremony was broadcast live on Nigerian national television. Nollywood actress Stella Damasus-Aboderin and Nollywood actor Segun Arinze hosted the ceremony.

== Winners ==
=== Major awards ===
The winners of the 14 Award Categories are listed first and highlighted in bold letters.

Best Picture	Best Director
The Mayors (Nigeria)	Dickson Iroegbu – The Mayors
Best Actress in a leading role	Best Actor in a leading role
Genevieve Nnaji	Richard Mofe Damijo - The Mayors
Best Actress in a Supporting role	Best Actor in a Supporting role
Omotola Jalade Ekeinde	Sam Dede - The Mayors
Best Indigenous Film	Best Child Actor
Ori (Nigeria)	Valiance Moneke
Best Cinematography	Best Screenplay
Abuja Connection (Nigeria)	The Mayors (Nigeria); Mastermind; Afonja (Nigeria); Yesterday (South Africa)
Best Musical Score	Best Sound
Osuofia in London (Nigeria); Ori (Nigeria); Aziza; Games Women Play (Nigeria)	Yesterday (South Africa); Eye of the Gods (Nigeria); Osuofia in London (Nigeria)
Best Makeup	Best Costume
Yesterday (South Africa); Eye of the Gods (Nigeria); Games Women Play (Nigeria)	Mastermind; Dabi-Dabi; Eye of the Gods (Nigeria); Afonja (Nigeria)
Best Editing	Best Special Effects
Yesterday (South Africa); The Mayors (Nigeria); Dangerous Twins (Nigeria)	Eye of the Gods (Nigeria); Egg of Life (Nigeria); Dangerous Twins (Nigeria)
Lifetime Achievement Award: Amaka Igwe
