= Africa Movie Academy Award for Best Sound =

The Africa Movie Academy Award for Best Sound is an annual merit by the Africa Film Academy to reward films with the most adjured and euphoric sound for the year.

Best Sound
Year	Film	Sound Mixers	Result
2005	Yesterday		Won
2005	Eye of the Gods		Nominated
2005	Osuofia in London		Nominated
2006	Widow's Cot		Won
2006	Eagle's Bride		Nominated
2006	Behind Closed Doors		Nominated
2006	Secret Adventure		Nominated
2006	Rising Moon		Nominated
2006	Arrou		Nominated
2007	Abeni		Won
2007	The Amazing Grace		Nominated
2007	Sitanda		Nominated
2007	Mokili		Nominated
2008	White Waters		Won
2008	Mirror of Beauty		Nominated
2008	Black Friday		Nominated
2008	Across the Niger		Nominated
2008	Mission to Nowhere		Nominated
2009	Seventh Heaven		Won
2009	From a Whisper		Nominated
2009	Battle of the Soul		Nominated
2009	Gugu and Andile		Nominated
2009	Grey Focus		Nominated
2010	I Sing of a Well		Won
2010	The Tenant		Nominated
2010	Season of a Life		Nominated
2010	The Perfect Picture		Nominated
2010	Soul Diaspora		Nominated
2011	Shirley Adams		Won
2011	Sinking Sands		Nominated
2011	Izulu Lami		Nominated
2011	Viva Riva!		Nominated
2011	Tango With Me		Nominated
2012	State of Violence		Won
2012	Otelo Burning		Nominated
2012	How to Steal 2 Million		Nominated
2012	Man on Ground		Nominated
2012	Algiers Murder		Nominated
2013	Nairobi Half Life		Won
2013	Last Flight to Abuja		Nominated
2013	Streets Of Calabar		Nominated
2013	Heroes and Zeros		Nominated
2013	Zama Zama		Nominated
2013	Virgin Magarida		Nominated
2014	The Forgotten Kingdom		Won
2014	Felix		Nominated
2014	A Northern Affair		Nominated
2014	Nothing For Mahala		Nominated
2014	Of Good Report		Nominated
2015	Lonbraz Kann		Won
2015	Le President		Nominated
2015	Timbuktu		Nominated
2015	Run		Nominated
2015	iNumber Number		Nominated
2016	Fifty		Won
2016	Eye of the Storm		Nominated
2016	The Cursed Ones		Nominated
2016	Behind Closed Doors		Nominated
2016	Rebecca		Nominated
2016	Falling		Nominated
2017	Vaya		Won
2017	93 Days		Nominated
2017	Félicité		Nominated
2017	Wulu		Nominated
2017	Dora’s Peace		Nominated
2018	Hotel Called Memory		Won
2018	The Lost Café		Nominated
2018	The Road To Sunshine		Nominated
2018	Pop Lock ‘N’ Roll		Nominated
2018	Sidechic Gang		Nominated
2019	Mabata Bata		Won
2019	Urgent		Nominated
2019	Redemption		Nominated
2019	Make Room		Nominated
2019	The Last Victim		Nominated
2019	The Delivery Boy		Nominated
2019	The Burial of Kojo		Nominated
2019	Sew the Winter to My Skin		Nominated
2020	Fiela’s Child		Won
2020	Knuckle City		Nominated
2020	Children of the Storm		Nominated
2020	The Ghost and House of Truth		Nominated
2020	For Maria: Ebun Pataki		Nominated
2020	40 Sticks		Nominated
2020	Desrances		Nominated
2020	Gold Coast Lounge		Nominated
2021	Hairareb		Pending
2021	African American		Pending
2021	The Gravedigger's Wife		Pending
2021	Eyimofe		Pending
2021	La Femme Anjola		Pending
