= Mission to Rescue =

2021 Kenyan action film

- Directed by: Gilbert Lukalia
- Written by: Cajetan Boy; Gilbert Lukalia
- Produced by: Samwel Kamau; David Wachira; Kara Loice Wambui
- Starring: Melvin Alusa; Warsame Abdi; Abdi Yusuf; Emmanuel Mugo; Andreo Kamau; Abubakar Mwenda; Sam Psenjen
- Cinematography: Victor Ombogo
- Edited by: Andrew Omolo
- Release date: 2 July 2021
- Country: Kenya
- Language: Swahili

Mission to Rescue is a 2021 Kenyan action film directed by Gilbert Lukalia. It was selected as the 2021 Kenyan entry for the Best International Feature Film at the 94th Academy Awards. The film is based on a true story based on the Al-Shabaab abduction of a French tourist in Kenya in 2011.

== Cast ==
- Melvin Alusa as Capt. Baraza
- Warsame Abdi as Salim
- Abdi Yusuf as Abdi
- Emmanuel Mugo as Cpl. Challo
- Andreo Kamau as Mohammed
- Abubakar Mwenda as Jibril
- Sam Psenjen as Asst. County Commissioner
- Anthony Ndung’u as Sgt. Bruno
- Bilal Mwaura as Wahab
- Justin Mirichi as Sgt. Ochi
- Abajah Brian as Cpl. Ian
- Melissa Kiplagat ATPU Officer 2
- Brian Ogola as ATPU Officer 1
- Mwamburi Maole as Sgt. Hakim

== Plot ==
The film is based on a true story based on the Al-Shabaab abduction of a French tourist in the coastal town of Kenya in 2011.

== Awards and nominations ==
Year	Award	Category	Recipient	Result	Ref
2021	Africa Movie Academy Awards	Best Film	Mission to Rescue	Nominated	
2021	Africa Movie Academy Awards	Best Director	Gilbert Lukalia	Nominated	
2021	Africa Movie Academy Awards	Best Actor in a Leading Role	Melvin Alusa	Nominated	
2021	Africa Movie Academy Awards	Achievement in Makeup	Mission to Rescue	Nominated	
2021	Africa Movie Academy Awards	Achievement in Editing	Mission to Rescue	Nominated	
2021	Africa Movie Academy Awards	Best Visual Effects	Mission to Rescue	Nominated	

== See also ==
- List of submissions to the 94th Academy Awards for Best International Feature Film
- List of Kenyan submissions for the Academy Award for Best International Feature Film
