= Melvin Alusa =

Kenyan actor

- Born: Nairobi, Kenya
- Citizenship: Kenyan
- Notable work: Mission to Rescue
- Children: 6
- Relatives: Bien Aime

Melvin Alusa is a Kenyan actor who has been featured in a number of local and international films, including Mission to Rescue and The Boy Who Harnessed the Wind, as well as participating in Big Brother Africa.

== Career ==
Alusa's acting career features both stage and screen acting. He has been featured in shows such as Crime and Justice.

== Personal life ==
Alusa was born in Nairobi, Kenya. His younger brother is the musician Bien Aime. He has eight children.

== Awards ==
Best Actor, Mission to Rescue - Zanzibar International Film Festival (ZIFF) 2021
