= Jonathan Pienaar =

South African actor (1962–2025)

- Born: 16 September 1962; South Africa
- Died: 10 November 2025 (aged 63); Auckland Park, Johannesburg, South Africa
- Education: Technikon Pretoria
- Occupation: Actor
- Years active: 1985–2025
- Height: 1.9 m (6 ft 3 in)
- Spouse: Rosana Maya

Jonathan Pienaar (16 September 1962 – 10 November 2025) was a South African actor, writer and comedian who was active for over 20 years.

== Life and career ==
Pienaar was born in South Africa on 16 September 1962. He attended high school at the Marist Brothers College (now Sacred Heart College) in Observatory, Johannesburg. Pienaar took a drama course at Technikon Pretoria.

He appeared in both South African and international films and television shows including Skin, Black Venus, Fried Barry, and To the Ends of the Earth, Cape Town, Troy: Fall of a City, and Deutschland 86.

Pienaar died on 10 November 2025, at the age of 63.

== Filmography ==
=== Film ===
Year	Title	Role	Notes
1985	Wild Maneuvres	"Turk"	
1987	American Ninja 2: The Confrontation	Taylor	
1987	You Must Be Joking Too!	Camp Boy	
1988	'n Wêreld Sonder Grense	Gus	
1988	Scavengers	Punk	
1988	Dune Surfer	Gar	
1989	The Tattoo Chase	Tony Ferrucci	
1990	Impact	Ronnie	
1991	Crazy Safari	Pilot	
1993	The Visual Bible: Matthew	Thaddeus	
1994	Kalahari Harry	Williams	
1998	The First Christmas		Voice role
1999	Husk	Stokkie	Short film
1999	The All New Adventures of Laurel & Hardy in For Love or Mummy	Young Henry Covington	
1999	Pirates of the Plain	Jesse	
2001	Lyklollery	Skroef	
2005	Blue Valentine	Him	Short film
2005	Dollar$ + White Pipes	Bernard Farber	
2006	A Lotto Madness		Short film
2006	Catch a Fire	The Mechanic	
2006	Blood Diamond	Cameraman	
2008	Skin	Van Niekerk	
2009	The Three Investigators and the Secret of Terror Castle	Sheriff Hanson	
2009	A Life with Less Meaning	Leonard	Short film
2010	Fast and Frantic	Solly Van Der Merwe	
2010	In a Time Without Love	Nikolai	Short film
2010	Black Venus	Alexander Dunlop	
2011	Ek Lief Jou	Chris de Wet	
2011	Inside Story	Scout	
2012	Soldier of Destiny	J.J. Dunlop	
2013	Shotgun Garfunkel	Mr. Snyman	
2013	Bustin' Chops: The Movie	Johnny	
2014	A Night to Remember	Eugene	Short film
2015	Assignment	Chris Sebastian	
2016	Lord Jones is Dead	Clive	
2016	PG	Dad	Short film
2016	Snaaks Genoeg	Farmer	
2016	Resilient	Redwood	
2017	Broken Darkness	Robert	
2017	The Killing Floor	Melvin Poon	
2018	Cowboy Dan	"Killer" Miller	Short film
2019	Either Way		Short film
2019	Monster Island	Captain Mato	
2020	Fried Barry	Dad	
2020	The Verdict	Axel	Short film
2020	The Last Days of American Crime	Randy Hickey	
2021	The Ring of Beasts	Nero	Short film

=== Television ===
Year	Title	Role	Notes
1990	Young Survivors	Petersen	Television film
1993	Sentinel	Jack Croucher	Television film
1994–1997	Triptiek	Pietman Bothma	Main role
1995	Danger Coast	Pieterson	Miniseries
1995	The Syndicate	Maimer	
1997	Mandela and de Klerk	Lieutenant Breevoort	Television film
1997	The Principal	Isak Stander	Miniseries
1997	The Legend of the Hidden City		Series 2
1997–1998	The Adventures of Sinbad	Tarsus / Xantax	2 episodes
1999	CI5: The New Professionals	Geary	Episode: "Tusk Force"
2001	Onder Draai die Duiwel Rond	Venter	Season 2
2001–2004	Yizo Yizo	De Villiers	Recurring role (seasons 2–3)
2005	To the Ends of the Earth	Smiles	Miniseries
2006–2008	The Lab	Chris Barlow	Recurring role
2006	Heartlines: The Miners	Johnny Meyer	Anthology
2006	Forsthaus Falkenau	Julius	Episode: "Entscheidung in der Savanne"
2007	Wild at Heart	Hunter	Episode: "The Wedding Reception"
2007	One Way	Ian	Episode: "Violent Delights"
2008	Crusoe	Captain Lynch	2 episodes
2008–2012	On the Couch	Dr. J.T.	Main role
2008	The Devil's Whore	Gaoler	1 episode
2009	Hopeville	Fred Palmer	Main role
2010	The Lost Future	Gagen	Television film
2012	Vloeksteen	Dick Van Veen	Recurring role (season 1)
2014	Task Force	Mike Rabie	
2014	Pawnshop Stories (Afrikaans: Pandjieswinkelstories)	Jellie Labuschagne	
2014	Aalwyntyd	Dad	Television film
2015	Binnelanders	Leon	Recurring role (season 11)
2016	Cape Town	Oliver Nienaber	Miniseries; 4 episodes
2016	Roots	Carrington	Miniseries; Part 1
2017	Empire of the Sharks	Mason Scrim	Television film
2018	Troy: Fall of a City	Priest Litos	Miniseries; 4 episodes
2018	6-Headed Shark Attack	Duke	Television film
2018	Deutschland 86	Gary Banks	5 episodes
2019	Warrior	Lem	Episode: "The Blood and the Sh*t"
2020	The Queen	Arno Theron	Season 4
2020	Queen Sono	Hendrikus Strydom	Episode: "I Am Queen Sono"
2020	Vagrant Queen		Episode: "Sunshine Express Yourself'
2020	Legacy	Andy	Episode: "Shock"
2020	Unmarried	Viktor	Recurring role (season 2)
2020–2021	The Watch	Sergeant Swires	2 episodes

== Stage ==
Year	Title	Role	Notes
1994	My Fat Friend		
2016	Kuele	Producer, director	POPArt Theatre, Johannesburg

== Awards and nominations ==
Year	Award	Category	Work	Result	Ref.
2006	South African Film and Television Awards	Best Actor in a Supporting Role – Feature Film	Dollar$ + White Pipes	Nominated	
