= Africa Movie Academy Award for Best Soundtrack =

The Africa Movie Academy Award for Best Soundtrack is an annual merit by the Africa Film Academy to reward the best use of music in a film for the year. It was introduced in the 1st edition as Best Musical Score. In the 3rd, 5th and 6th edition it was renamed to Best Original Soundtrack. It was known as Best Music in the 4th edition. In the 7th edition it was called Best Soundtrack. Since the 8th edition it has been called Achievement in Soundtrack.

Best Soundtrack
Year	Film	Country	Recipient	Result
2005	Osuofia in London	(Nigeria)		Won
2005	Ori			Nominated
2005	Aziza			Nominated
2005	Games Women Play			Nominated
2006	Sofia	(Burkina Faso)		Won
2006	Behind Closed Doors			Nominated
2006	Secret Adventure			Nominated
2006	Arrou			Nominated
2006	Tanyaradzwa			Nominated
2007	Iwalewa	(Nigeria)		Won
2007	Sitanda			Nominated
2007	Bunny Chow			Nominated
2008	Mirror of Beauty	(Nigeria)		Won
2008	White Waters			Nominated
2008	Cash Money			Nominated
2008	Run Baby Run			Nominated
2008	Black Friday			Nominated
2009	From a Whisper	(Kenya)		Won
2009	Arugba			Nominated
2009	Agony of the Christ			Nominated
2009	Jenifa			Nominated
2009	Beautiful Soul			Nominated
2010	A Sting in a Tale	(Ghana)		Won
2010	Seasons of a Life			Nominated
2010	Imani			Nominated
2010	The Child			Nominated
2010	The Figurine			Nominated
2011	Inale	(Nigeria)		Won
2011	Viva Riva!			Nominated
2011	Africa United			Nominated
2011	Izulu lami			Nominated
2011	A Small Town Called Descent			Nominated
2012	Alero’s Symphony	(Nigeria)	Faze	Won
2012	Otelo Burning			Nominated
2012	Adesuwa			Nominated
2012	How to Steal 2 Million			Nominated
2012	Somewhere in Africa			Nominated
2013	The Last Fishing Boat	(Malawi)		Won
2013	Journey to Self			Nominated
2013	Okoro The Prince			Nominated
2013	Hoodrush			Nominated
2013	Nairobi Half Life			Nominated
2013	The Twin Sword			Nominated
2014	Onye Ozi	(Nigeria) (United Kingdom)		Won
2014	Once Upon a Road Trip			Nominated
2014	Felix			Nominated
2014	Of Good Report			Nominated
2014	Potomanto			Nominated
2015	Triangle Going To America			Won
2015	A Place in the Stars			Nominated
2015	Iyore			Nominated
2015	Njinga: Queen Of Angola			Nominated
2015	Timbuktu			Nominated
2016	O-Town			Won
2016	Tell Me Sweet Something			Nominated
2016	The Cursed Ones			Nominated
2016	Hear Me Move			Nominated
2016	Le Pagne			Nominated
2017	Félicité			Won
2017	Vaya			Nominated
2017	93 Days			Nominated
2017	A Mile in My Shoes			Nominated
2017	76			Nominated
2017	While We Live			Nominated
2018	Hotel Called Memory			Won
2018	The Road To Sunshine			Nominated
2018	Tatu			Nominated
2018	Isoken			Nominated
2018	Siembamba			Nominated
2019	Mabata Bata			Won
2019	Subira			Nominated
2019	Farewell Ella Bella			Nominated
2019	Redemption			Nominated
2019	The Delivery Boy			Nominated
2019	Lara and the Beat			Nominated
2019	Sew the Winter to My Skin			Nominated
2019	The Mercy of the Jungle			Nominated
2020	Gold Coast Lounge			Won
2020	The Fisherman’s Diary			Nominated
2020	Coming from Insanity			Nominated
2020	Zulu Wedding			Nominated
2020	For Maria: Ebun Pataki			Nominated
2020	Walking with Shadows			Nominated
2020	Living in Bondage: Breaking Free			Nominated
2020	Mirage			Nominated
2021	Citation			Won
2021	Nyara (The Kidnapper)			Nominated
2021	The Gravedigger’s Wife			Nominated
2021	This Lady Called Life			Nominated
2021	Hotel on the Koppies			Nominated
