= The Gravedigger's Wife =

2021 drama film

- Film poster
- Directed by: Khadar Ayderus Ahmed
- Written by: Khadar Ayderus Ahmed
- Produced by: Misha Jaari; Mark Lwoff; Risto Nikkilä; Thanassis Karathanos; Martin Hampel; Stéphane Parthenay; Robin Boespflug-Vonie
- Starring: Omar Abdi; Yasmin Warsame
- Cinematography: Arttu Peltomaa
- Edited by: Sebastian Thümler
- Music by: Andre Matthias
- Production companies: Bufo; Twenty Twenty Vision; Pyramide Productions
- Distributed by: Orange Studio
- Release dates: July 7, 2021 (Cannes); October 21, 2022 (United Kingdom)
- Running time: 83 minutes
- Countries: France; Somalia; Germany; Finland
- Language: Somali

The Gravedigger's Wife (Finnish: Guled & Nasra, lit. 'Guled and Nasra') is a drama film, directed by Khadar Ayderus Ahmed and released in 2021. The film is a coproduction of companies from France, Germany and Finland.

Ahmed's feature debut, the film was inspired by a death in his own family approximately a decade earlier. It was shot in 2019, although release was delayed until 2021 because of the COVID-19 pandemic and its disruptions of film distribution in 2020.

The film premiered in the Critics' Week program at the 2021 Cannes Film Festival. It was subsequently screened at the 2021 Toronto International Film Festival, where it was one of the winners of the Amplify Voices Award. It was selected as the Somali entry for the Best International Feature Film at the 94th Academy Awards, the first time that Somalia had submitted a film.

== Plot ==
Guled (Omar Abdi), a gravedigger in Djibouti, is struggling to raise money to pay for surgery when his wife Nasra (Yasmin Warsame) becomes gravely ill with kidney disease.

== Awards and nominations ==
Year	Award	Category	Recipient	Result	Ref
2021	Africa Movie Academy Awards	Best Film	The Gravedigger’s Wife	Won	
2021	Africa Movie Academy Awards	Best Director	Khadar Ahmed	Nominated	
2021	Africa Movie Academy Awards	Best Actor in a Leading Role	Omar Abdi	Won	
2021	Africa Movie Academy Awards	Achievement in Makeup	The Gravedigger’s Wife	Won	
2021	Africa Movie Academy Awards	Achievement in Cinematography	The Gravedigger’s Wife	Nominated	
2021	Africa Movie Academy Awards	Achievement in Production Design	The Gravedigger’s Wife	Won	
2021	Africa Movie Academy Awards	Best Soundtrack	The Gravedigger’s Wife	Nominated	
2021	Africa Movie Academy Awards	Best Sound	The Gravedigger’s Wife	Nominated	
2021	Africa Movie Academy Awards	Best First Feature Film by a Director	The Gravedigger’s Wife/Khadar Ahmed	Nominated	

== See also ==
- List of submissions to the 94th Academy Awards for Best International Feature Film
- List of Somalian submissions for the Academy Award for Best International Feature Film
