= Africa Movie Academy Award for Best Makeup =

Film award category

The Africa Movie Academy Award for Best Makeup is an annual merit by the Africa Film Academy to reward the best transformation in a film for the year.

Best Makeup
Year	Film	Makeup by	Result
2005	Yesterday		Won
2005	Eye of the Gods		Nominated
2005	Games Women Play		Nominated
2006	My Mother's Heart		Won
2006	Eagle's Bride		Nominated
2006	Secret Adventure		Nominated
2006	Rising Moon		Nominated
2007	Azima		Won
2007	Maroko		Nominated
2007	Covenant Church		Nominated
2007	The Amazing Grace		Nominated
2008	Princess Tyra		Won
2008	New Jerusalem		Nominated
2008	Mirror of Beauty		Nominated
2008	African Soldier		Nominated
2008	Across the Niger		Nominated
2009	Live to Remember		Won
2009	Agony of the Christ		Nominated
2009	From a Whisper		Nominated
2009	The Assassin		Nominated
2009	Ase n’tedumare		Nominated
2010	The Child		Won
2010	I Sing of a Well		Nominated
2010	Heart of Men		Nominated
2010	The King is Mine		Nominated
2010	Fulani		Nominated
2011	Sinking Sands		Won
2011	Viva Riva!		Nominated
2011	Inale		Nominated
2011	A Private Storm		Nominated
2011	A Small Town Called Descent		Nominated
2012	Shattered		Won
2012	Rugged Priest		Nominated
2012	Adesuwa		Nominated
2012	State Research Bureau		Nominated
2012	Somewhere in Africa		Nominated
2013	The Meeting		Won
2013	The Twin Sword		Nominated
2013	Elelwani		Nominated
2013	Ninah’s Dowry		Nominated
2013	Okoro The Prince		Nominated
2013	Uhlanga the Mark		Nominated
2014	Once Upon A Road Trip		Won
2014	A Mile from Home		Nominated
2014	Apaye		Nominated
2014	Felista Fable		Nominated
2014	Potomanto		Nominated
2019	The Mercy of the Jungle		Won
2019	Veronica's Wish	Joan Nantege	Nominated
2019	Make Room		Nominated
2019	The Burial of Kojo		Nominated
2019	Before the Vows		Nominated
2019	Gold Statue		Nominated
2019	Sew the Winter to My Skin		Nominated
2020	The Milkmaid	Rahila Manga	Won
2020	Knuckle City		Nominated
2020	Ratnik		Nominated
2020	1929		Nominated
2020	Heroes of Africa		Nominated
2021	The Gravedigger’s Wife		Won
2021	Fried Barry		Nominated
2021	Tecora		Nominated
2021	The Takers		Nominated
2021	Mission To Rescue		Nominated
