= Nhamo =

- Directed by: Eunice Chiweshe Goldstein
- Written by: Eunice Chiweshe Goldstein
- Produced by: Eunice Chiweshe Goldstein; Ben Pitts
- Starring: Thabo Nyaku; Garion Dowds; Kagiso Legoadi; Molefi Monaisa
- Production company: Clockwork 9 Pictures
- Distributed by: Clockwork 9 Pictures
- Release date: 2011
- Running time: 12 minutes
- Countries: South Africa; United States; Zimbabwe
- Language: English

Nhamo is a 2011 short film written and directed by Eunice Chiweshe Goldstein. It runs approximately eleven minutes and fifty-seven seconds long. Countries of production are United States, South Africa, and Zimbabwe. The film was nominated for Africa Movie Academy Awards Best Short Film.

== Cast ==
- Thabo Nyaku as Musati
- Garion Dowds as Alden
- Kagiso Legoadi as Timbo
- Molefi Monaisa as Mutombo
