= Uhlanga the Mark =

2012 South African drama film

- Directed by: Ndaba Ka Ngwane
- Screenplay by: Ndaba Ka Ngwane
- Based on: rural poverty
- Produced by: Ndaba Ka Ngwane
- Starring: Sbo Da Poet; Thuli Mhlongo; Linda Sibiya
- Cinematography: Khulekani Zondi
- Edited by: Khulekani Zondi
- Release date: 15 July 2012
- Running time: 90 minutes
- Country: South Africa
- Language: Zulu

Uhlanga the Mark also known as Uhlanga: The Mark is a 2012 South African drama film produced, written, directed by award-winning author Ndaba Ka Ngwane on his directorial debut. The film stars Sbo Da Poet, Thuli Mhlongo and award-winning DJ Linda Sibiya on his acting debut in the lead roles. The background music for the film was scored by Khulekani Zondi who also handled the cinematography and editing. The theme of the film is based on the violence and rural poverty in modern South Africa. The film was made with a low budget and was released on 15 July 2012. It received critical acclaim from the critics for its screenplay, visual effects and cinematography. The film was also premiered in several international film festivals in South Africa, UK, Italy and Germany. The film has won several awards and nominations in International film festivals.

== Cast ==
- Sbo Da Poet as Khaba Mkhize
- Thuli Mhlongo as Nokuthula Khumalo
- Linda Sibiya as Mandla Thabete
- Nomfundo Dubazana as Prudence Ngwenya

== Synopsis ==
The film unveils the story about a nine-year-old boy whose life turns into a tragedy following his father's death.

== Plot ==
Khaba Mkhize (Sbo Da Poet) is a young boy along with his mother and sisters, who has to rush to a newly built house after his father's death. Bullied and discriminated at school, Khaba obtains a seemingly unlikely alliance with Nokuthula Khumalo (Thuli Mhlango), a 17-year-old girl from a well to do family who is in fact hiding her own dark secret. Mandla Thabete (Linda Sibiya) starts off at the bottom off the food chain as a low paid sugarcane farmer who loses his job but shows his resilience by tackling the obstacles that he faces. One day, all three youngsters meet together and form an alliance.

== Critical reception ==
The film was selected as the opening film at the Africa-in-Motion Film Festival in November 2012. The film was screened at the 2012 Durban International Film Festival on 31 May and also had its premiere release in UK, Italy and Germany during October 2012.

The film was also screened at the Glasgow Film Theatre on 28 October 2012.

== Awards and nominations ==
The film was nominated in five categories at the 2013 Africa Movie Academy Awards and won the Award for the Best Cinematography. In addition, the film won five awards at the 2012 Zanzibar International Film Festival including the Golden Dhow Award, Ousmane Sembene Award, Verona Award and the Signis International Award.

| Year | Award | Category | Result |
|---|---|---|---|
| 2013 | 9th Africa Movie Academy Awards | Best Editing | Nominated |
| 2013 | 9th Africa Movie Academy Awards | Best Makeup | Nominated |
| 2013 | 9th Africa Movie Academy Awards | Best Visual Effects | Nominated |
| 2013 | 9th Africa Movie Academy Awards | Best Cinematography | Won |
| 2013 | 9th Africa Movie Academy Awards | Best Young Actor | Nominated |
