= Qware =

Kenyan TV series

- Genre: Drama
- Written by: Jazzmine Maina; Kevin Mbayagi; Cherotich Kibet; Marcus Douglas
- Directed by: Ashford Kirimi; Davis Nato
- Starring: Vanessa Okeyo; Reinhard Inzai Bonke; Elle Ciru; Silayio Neema; Damaris Ketrai; Bernard Oduor; Alex Khayo; Robert Agengo; Martin Kigondu; Moses Kiema; Amani Mwasera
- Country of origin: Kenya
- Original languages: English; Swahili
- No. of seasons: 1
- No. of episodes: 26

Production
- Producer: Edwin Mulima
- Production company: Naota Media

Original release
- Network: Maisha Magic Plus

Qware is a 2025 Kenyan television drama series series that debuted on Maisha Magic Plus channel on DStv on 20 July 2025.

== Plot ==
In the opulent yet treacherous world of the Qware Group, appearances are everything and lies are currency. When Saul Simba is assassinated and his daughter Leila is found at the crime scene, she becomes a scapegoat for a hostile takeover orchestrated by her uncle, SJ.

After being framed, Leila becomes embroiled in a conflict beyond her control. As she attempts to uncover the circumstances surrounding her family's past, she must rebuild fractured alliances and confront competing interests within Nairobi’s elite social and political circles. The stroy explores themes of power, loyalty, and secrecy, with hidden truth playing a central role in the unfolding events.

== Cast ==
- Vanessa Okeyo as Leila Simba, the lead protagonist. She is the daughter of Elsa and Solo; and the heir of Qware Group.
- Reinhard Inzai Bonke as SJ, uncle to Leila. He is an ambitious man.
- Silayio Neema as Elsa Simba, mother to Leila. She is serves as the president of Qware Group.
- Ella Ciru as Victoria Simba, SJ's Wife
- Damaris Ketrai as Melissa, elder sister to Elsa and a surrogate mother to Leila.
- Bernard Oduor as Richard
- Alex Khayo as Sting, an ally of SJ and Melissa.
- Robert Agengo as Virus
- Martin Kigondu as Detective Zuberi, a family friend and police officer.
- Moses Kiema as Detective Brian, a dirty cop.
- Amani Mwasera as Declan, Sting’s adopted son and apprentice.

== Series overview ==
Season	Episodes	Originally released	
Season	Episodes	First released	Last released
1	TBC	July 20, 2025	Ongoing

=== Season 1 (2025) ===
No.	Title	Directed by	Original release date
1	"Episode 1"	Various	20 July 2025
Leila's birthday celebration turns deadly when gunshots erupt, leaving her father dead and Leila holding the smoking gun.
2	"Episode 2"	Various	27 July 2025
Leila struggles to prove her innocence while her uncle SJ capitalizes on the chaos, ascending to power within Qware.
3	"Episode 3"	Various	20 July 2025
Betrayal and suspicion grow as Melisa's motives remain unclear. Leila seeks her freedom as Tony uncovers a conspiracy.
4	"Episode 4"	Various	3 August 2025
Leila's unexpected release creates additional challenges for SJ as Melisa's ruthlessness collides with Elsa's desperation.
5	"Episode 5"	Various	10 August 2025
Haunted by Saul's death, Melisa and Declan help Leila find peace while SJ and Sting plot their next move.
6	"Episode 6"	Various	17 August 2025
As the search for Elsa intensifies, rivalries flare between Tony and Brian, and Sting closes in on his target.
7	"Episode 7"	Various	24 August 2025
Haunted by Saul's death, Melisa and Declan help Leila find peace while SJ and Sting plot their next move.
8	"Episode 8"	Various	31 August 2025
Leila appears on a podcast to share her perspective on the events that transpired the night her father passed away.
9	"Episode 9"	Various	7 September 2025
Leila appears on a podcast to share her perspective on the events that transpired the night her father passed away.

== Production ==
=== Development ===
Qware was announced in early July 2025 ahead of its premiere later in the month. The show is produced by Naota Media, the creators of other local shows, Muheshimiwa and Joni.

Producer Edwin Mulima cited the inspiration for Qware grew out of years of watching the power struggles and hidden wars within Kenya’s wealthiest households. He said "I have witnessed family empires shaken by death, greed, and betrayal — and I wanted to dramatize that on screen. It is about more than money: it is about what happens when blood ties become battle lines.”

== Release ==
The show is set to premiere on 20 July, and subsequent episodes being available every Sunday.
