= Fried Barry =

2020 horror film

- Film poster
- Directed by: Ryan Kruger
- Screenplay by: Ryan Kruger
- Produced by: James C. Williamson; Ryan Kruger
- Starring: Gary Green; Bianka Hartenstein; Sean Cameron Michael; Chanelle de Jager; Joey Cramer; Jonathan Pienaar
- Edited by: Stephen Du Plessis
- Music by: Haezer
- Distributed by: Shudder
- Release date: 6 March 2020 (Cinequest Film Festival)
- Running time: 109 minutes
- Country: South Africa
- Language: English

Fried Barry is a 2020 South African black comedy science fiction horror film written and directed by Ryan Kruger. The film has its world premiere at the 2020 Cinequest Film Festival. The film stars Gary Green, Bianka Hartenstein, Sean Cameron Michael, Chanelle de Jager, Joey Cramer, and Jonathan Pienaar. The story follows a drug addict whose body is taken over by an alien, who goes on a joyride through Cape Town, South Africa.

== Cast ==
- Gary Green as Barry
- Bianka Hartenstein as Prostitute
- Sean Cameron Michael as Ronald
- Chanelle de Jager as Suz
- Joey Cramer as Self
- Jonathan Pienaar as Daddy
- Kevin Mohoni
- Tuks Tad Lungu as Lowlife Guy
- Brett Williams as Jono
- Colin Moss as Jack

== Release ==
The film had its world premiere at the 2020 Cinequest Film Festival and also screened at Sitges Film Festival, Fantasia Film Festival, Grimmfest and Fantasporto. It has also screened at South Africa's RapidLion Film Festival winning three awards.

In March 2021, it was announced that Shudder acquired the distribution rights of the film for release in North America, the United Kingdom, Ireland, Australia and New Zealand on 6 May of that year.

Review aggregator website Rotten Tomatoes gives the film a score of 80% based on 59 reviews, summarising "A bizarrely memorable sci-fi/comedy hybrid, Fried Barry may be an acquired taste, but it certainly isn't chicken."

== Awards and nominations ==
| Year | Award | Category | Recipient | Result | Ref |
|---|---|---|---|---|---|
| 2021 | Africa Movie Academy Awards | Best Film | Fried Barry | Nominated | |
| 2021 | Africa Movie Academy Awards | Best Director | Ryan Kruger | Nominated | |
| 2021 | Africa Movie Academy Awards | Best Actor in a Leading Role | Gary Green | Nominated | |
| 2021 | Africa Movie Academy Awards | Achievement in Makeup | Fried Barry | Nominated | |
| 2021 | Africa Movie Academy Awards | Achievement in Editing | Fried Barry | Nominated | |
| 2021 | Africa Movie Academy Awards | Best Visual Effects | Fried Barry | Won | |
| 2021 | Africa Movie Academy Awards | Best First Feature Film by a Director | Ryan Kruger | Nominated | |
