= Black Venus (2010 film) =

2010 film

- Film poster
- Directed by: Abdellatif Kechiche
- Written by: Abdellatif Kechiche; Ghalya Laroix
- Produced by: Charles Gillibert; Nathanaël Karmitz; Marin Karmitz
- Starring: Yahima Torres; Olivier Gourmet
- Cinematography: Lubomir Bakchev
- Production company: MK2
- Distributed by: MK2
- Release dates: 8 September 2010 (Venice); 27 October 2010 (France)
- Running time: 162 minutes
- Countries: France; Belgium; Tunisia
- Languages: French; English; Afrikaans

Black Venus (French: Vénus noire) is a 2010 French drama film directed by Abdellatif Kechiche. It is based on the life of Sarah Baartman, a Khoikhoi woman who in the early 19th century was exhibited in Europe under the name "Hottentot Venus". The film was nominated for the Golden Lion at the 67th Venice International Film Festival, where it was awarded the Equal Opportunity Award.

== Plot ==
In Paris 1815, the Royal Academy of Medicine. Georges Cuvier declared "I have never seen a human head so similar to that of an ape." Standing by a moulded cast of Saartjie Baartman's body, anatomist Cuvier's verdict is categorical. Several years before in 1810 Sarah Baartman, a Khoikhoi woman from the Cape Colony, is brought to London by Hendrick Caezer, an Afrikaner. Caezer puts her on display as the "Hottentot venus" in freak shows, exploiting her physique-mainly her large buttocks and exotic looks. She is presented as a spectacle, where people are invited to touch and gawk her.

Over time, Sarah becomes more resentful as the shows continue. This eventually gets the attention of abolitionist groups, who take the matter to court. However despite the backlash Caezer coerces her to admit that she is doing these shows on her own free will.

A few years later she is baptised and is sold to a French animal trainer named Réaux, who takes her to Paris. In France her exploitation continues, but the situation worsens as she is forced to take part in even more humiliating spectacles where she is subjected to sexual degradation.

Sarah's body attracts the interest of French scientists, including Georges Cuvier, who offers money to examine her. Réaux sends her to Cuvier for scientific examination, but Sarah resists, and no deal is reached. As her financial situation worsens, Sarah's life spirals into despair, leading her to engage in prostitution to survive. Her health declines, and she dies in 1815. After Sarah's death, Réaux sells her corpse to Cuvier, who conducts further examinations.

== Cast ==
- Yahima Torres as Sarah Baartman
- Andre Jacobs as Caezar
- Olivier Gourmet as Réaux, le forain
- Elina Löwensohn as Jeanne
- François Marthouret as Georges Cuvier
- Jean-Christophe Bouvet as Mercailler
- Jonathan Pienaar as Alexander Dunlop
- Phillip Schurer as Peter Wageninger
- Ralph Amoussou as Harry

== Reception ==
Black Venus holds a 100% rating on Rotten Tomatoes, based on five reviews.
