= Anthonieta Kalunta =

Nigerian actress

- Born: Nigeria
- Occupations: Actress,presenter
- Known for: Role in The Milkmaid (2020)
- Awards: AMAA nominee

Anthonieta Ijeoma Kalunta is a Nigerian actress and presenter. She is known for her role in The Milkmaid (2020), a drama film addressing insurgency and the abduction of young girls in northeastern Nigeria, which was Nigeria's submission for the Academy Award for Best International Feature Film. She has also worked as a radio and television presenter and received recognitions from YNaija, Pulse Nigeria, BellaNaija and Net Entertainment, as well as a nomination at the Africa Movie Academy Awards.
