= Omar Abdi =

Somali-Canadian diplomat

Deputy Executive Director of UNICEF
- In office 2014–2026
- Appointed by: Ban Ki-moon
- Preceded by: Geeta Rao Gupta
- Succeeded by: Ted Chaiban

Personal details
- Born: Somalia
- Profession: Diplomat

Omar Abdi is a Somali-Canadian diplomat who served as the Deputy Executive Director of the United Nations Children's Fund (UNICEF) from 2014 to 2026.

== Education ==
Abdi has a Bachelor of Science in civil engineering from the Somali National University in Mogadishu. He later received a doctoral degree in development economics and a master's in regional development planning, both from Cornell University.

== Career ==
Abdi held several leadership positions in UNICEF including as Country Representative in Pakistan, Ghana and Liberia, Regional Director in the Middle East and North Africa, Comptroller and CFO, and Deputy Executive Director for Management, and Field Results.

From 2016, following an appointment by United Nations Secretary-General Ban Ki-moon, Abdi served as the Deputy Executive Director for programmes at UNICEF; he succeeded Geeta Rao Gupta. In this capacity, he oversaw UNICEF's global humanitarian and development programmes. In 2020, he was part of the selection committee that chose José Manuel Barroso as chair of GAVI’s board.

== Other activities ==
- Global Partnership for Education (GPE), Member of the Board of Directors
- Partnership for Maternal, Newborn & Child Health (PMNCH), Member of the Board
