= Africa Movie Academy Award for Best Visual Effects =

Film award category

The Africa Movie Academy Award for Best Visual Effects is an annual merit by the Africa Film Academy to reward movies with the best visual effects for the year. It was introduced in 2005 as Best Special effects, and has been known as Best Visual Effects since the second edition till date except the 4th edition when it was simply called Best Effects.

Best Visual Effects
Year	Film	Recipient	Result
2005	Eye of the Gods		Won
2005	Egg of Life		Nominated
2005	Dangerous Twins		Nominated
2006	Rising Moon		Won
2006	Behind Closed Doors		Nominated
2006	Secret Adventure		Nominated
2006	My Mother's Heart		Nominated
2007	Snake Girl		Won
2007	Explosion		Nominated
2007	The Amazing Grace		Nominated
2008	Across the Niger		Won
2008	New Jerusalem		Nominated
2008	Iranse Aje		Nominated
2008	Ipa		Nominated
2008	Bleeding Rose		Nominated
2009	Battle of the Souls		Won
2009	Five Apostles		Nominated
2009	Smoke and Mirrors		Nominated
2009	Agony of the Christ		Nominated
2009	Revolution		Nominated
2010	The Figurine		Won
2010	The Child		Nominated
2010	A Sting in a Tale		Nominated
2010	Fulani		Nominated
2010	Heart of Men		Nominated
2011	A Small Town Called Descent		Won
2011	Aramotu		Nominated
2011	Nani		Nominated
2011	Who Owns da City		Nominated
2011	Inale		Nominated
2012	Adesuwa		Won
2012	Behind The Mask		Nominated
2012	Somewhere in Africa		Nominated
2012	State Research Bureau		Nominated
2012	Otelo Burning		Nominated
2013	The Twin Sword		Won
2013	Okoro The Prince		Nominated
2013	Elelwani		Nominated
2013	Last Flight to Abuja		Nominated
2013	Uhlanga the Mark		Nominated
2013	Awakening		Nominated
2014	A Mile from Home		Won
2014	Omo Elemosho		Nominated
2014	Secret Room		Nominated
2014	Ni Sisi		Nominated
2014	Of Good Report		Nominated
2015	Inumber Number – South Africa		Won
2015	Kpians – Nigeria		Nominated
2015	Run – Cote D’voire		Nominated
2015	invasion 1897 – Nigeria		Nominated
2015	Triangle Going To America – Ethiopia		Nominated
2016	Oshimiri - Nigeria	Onaji Stephen Onche	Won
2016	Hear me move		Nominated
2016	Stupid Movie		Nominated
2016	House arrest		Nominated
2016	A Soldier's Story		Nominated
2017	Wulu		Won
2017	Oloibiri		Nominated
2017	Whale Caller		Nominated
2017	Queen of Katwe		Nominated
2017	Slow Country		Nominated
2018	Lucky Specials		Won
2018	Siembamba		Nominated
2018	Icheke Oku		Nominated
2018	Esohe		Nominated
2018	Kada River		Nominated
2019	The Delivery Boy		Won
2019	Sew the Winter to My Skin		Nominated
2019	Make Room		Nominated
2019	Knockout Blessing		Nominated
2019	Mabata Bata		Nominated
2019	The Burial of Kojo		Nominated
2019	King of Boys		Nominated
2020	Knuckle City		Won
2020	Heroes of Africa; Tette Quarshie		Nominated
2020	Desrances		Nominated
2020	Living in Bondage: Breaking Free		Nominated
2020	Badamasi		Nominated
2020	Ratnik		Nominated
2020	Foreigner’s God		Nominated
2020	A Taste of Our Land		Nominated
2021	Fried Barry		Won
2021	Nneka The Pretty Serpent		Nominated
2021	Stain		Nominated
2021	The Takers		Nominated
2021	Mission to Rescue		Nominated
