= Robert Agengo =

Kenyan actor and director

- Born: 22 April 1986 (age 39); Kibera, Nairobi, Kenya
- Occupation: Actor

Robert Agengo (born April 22, 1986) is a Kenyan actor and casting director. He is most known for his roles in The Boy Who Harnessed the Wind (2019), Sue Na Jonnie, Mali, Kona, 40 Sticks (2020), Qware (2025) and Adam to Eve.

== Early life ==
Robert Agengo was born in Kibera, Nairobi on April 22, 1986. He attended Ayany Primary School from 1993 to 2000. While there, he developed an interest in acting, first appearing on TV in the 90s, performing in a play, Mistake, which was broadcast on Kenya's national broadcaster, Kenya Broadcasting Corporation.

He completed his secondary education at Ngelani High School in 2004, following years of active involvement in the school's Drama Club. Robert also terms himself as an amateur boxer, having developed an interest while working out at a neighbour's local gym.

== Career ==
Following graduation from high school, Robert took part in an array of auditions which eventually landed him a spot at Jicho Four Productions. During his time here, he would travel to different schools all over the country performing set book performances. He left the production house in 2005 to pursue a career on the mainstage, at the Kenya National Theatre.

Over the next two years, he performed in plays across Kenya's capital, including at the Kenya National Theatre, Alliance Française in Nairobi, and the former Phoenix Players. He then forayed into film, pursuing auditions which mostly landed him roles as an extra in numerous local television shows, such as Makutano Junction, Shika Pata Potea, Krazy Kenyans, and Changes.

Agengo featured in the 2010 film Lost in Africa (originally titled Kidnappet), which starred actress Connie Nielsen in a lead role. Thereafter, he landed a role in the recurring scripted series, Mali, which preceded another pivotal moment in his career when he landed a significant role on the Multichoice Africa television show Kona in 2013.

The Kenyan actor has gone on to star in a host of other local and continental television shows such as Warembo Salon, Skandals Kibao and, Sue na Jonnie, which is recognised as one of the most popular shows in Africa. In 2014, he featured in a total of four films for Multichoice Africa, before landing a role in Chiwetel Ejiofor's critically acclaimed Netflix film The Boy Who Harnessed the Wind. In 2020, he starred on the thriller 40 Sticks which was made available worldwide to stream on Netflix.

== Work ==
=== Filmography ===
He has appeared in the following films:

- 2024 The Dog, as Papa
- 2021 Adisa, as Adisa's Father
- 2020 Uradi, as Issah
- 2020 40 Sticks, as Pablo
- 2019 The Boy Who Harnessed the Wind, as Jeremiah Kamkwamba

=== Television ===
In East Africa, he is most famous for his leading roles in series such as Kona (TV series) and in Sue na Jonnie. He currently also stars in Maisha Magic Plus' Qware, Adam to Eve and Lulu.

=== Awards and recognition ===
- 2020 Kisima Music Film Awards for Best Actor, for 40 Sticks
- 2020 Africa Movie Academy Award for Best Actor in a Leading Role, nomination for his role in 40 Sticks
