= Efere Ozako =

Entertainment lawyer from Nigeria

Efere Ozako (1967—2013) was an entertainment lawyer from Delta State, Nigeria, who gained public attention through his Wetin Lawyers Dey Do Sef? initiative. He advocated the need to engage lawyers in business agreements, as well as the need to protect intellectual rights of artists in the Nigerian entertainment industry.

== Death ==
He died at age 46 in April 2013.

== See also ==
- 12th Africa Movie Academy Awards
