= Kalasha International TV and Film Market =

Kenyan Trade Fair

The Kalasha International TV and Film Market (Kalasha International TV and Film Market, Festival and Awards) is a trade fair and film festival organized by the Kenya Film Commission that brings together local, regional and international TV and film to gather, discuss exchange, collaborate, share stories and develop new business opportunities. The inaugural Kalasha International TV and Film Market occurred in October 2015 at the Kenyatta International Convention Centre (KICC) and since then the film market has become a popular event in the industry.

The event provides high-level interaction with Commissioners, Producers, Directors, Scriptwriters, Network groups, TV Channels, Mobile operators, Distributors to exchange knowledge on new programs and development policy. There are also side events such as the trade show, workshops, coaching and pitching sessions.
