= Maryam Booth =

Nigerian actress and model (born 1993)

Maryam_Booth
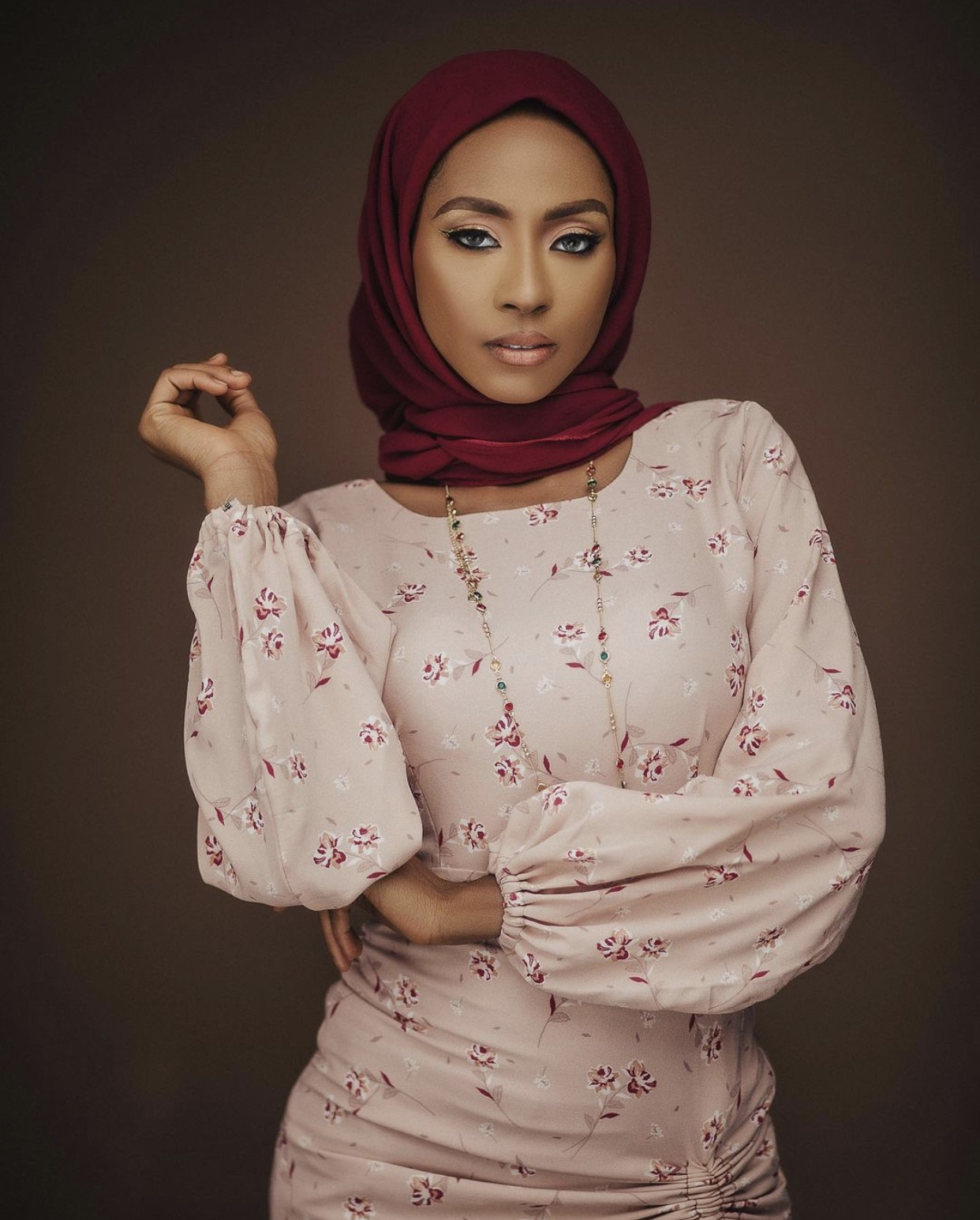
- Born: Maryam Ado Mohammed Daula; 28 October 1993 (age 32); Kano, Kano State, Nigeria
- Citizenship: Nigeria
- Occupation: Actress
- Known for: Dijangala and her role in The Milkmaid
- Parent: Zainab Booth
- Relatives: Ahmed Booth (brother)
- Awards: Africa Movie Academy Award for Best Actress in a Supporting Role

Maryam Ado Mohammed Daula (born 28 October 1993), known professionally as Maryam Booth, is a Nigerian actress and model. She is best known for her role in The Milkmaid, which was Nigeria's submission for the Academy Award for Best International Feature Film. For her performance as Zainab in the film, she won the Africa Movie Academy Award for Best Actress in a Supporting Role. In 2022, she was appointed brand ambassador for Sumal Foods.

== Early life and education ==
Mohammed was born on 28 October 1993, in Kano, Kano State. Two of her siblings, as well as her late mother Zainab Booth are also professional actors. In an interview with BellaNaija, she disclosed that she's been acting since she was eight years old.

== Career ==
She hosted the 2019 edition of the Best of Nollywood Awards. In 2020, she won the Africa Movie Academy Award for Best Actress in a Supporting Role for her performance in The Milkmaid, directed by Desmond Ovbiagele.

== Filmography ==
=== Films ===
- The Milkmaid (2020) as Zainab
- Sanitation Day (2021) as Munirat
- The Kiss of Death (2024)
- The Suyis (2024)
- The Two Aishas (2023)
- Beyond the Veil (2023)
- Lamba (2022)
- Sarki Goma Zamani Goma (2021)
- Tsakaninmu (2021)
- Lagos to Abuja Coach (2020)
- Jalil (2020)
- Maimuna (2020)
- Karki Manta Dani (2019)
- Na Yarda (2019)
- Gwarzon Shekara (2018)
- Ruwan Dare (2018)
- Hakkunde (2017)
- Rariya (2017)
- Mijin Biza (2017)
- Dijangala (2008)
- Bakar Tukunya (2007).

=== TV series ===
- Sons of the Caliphate
