= Naana Hayford =

Ghanaian actress

Naana Hayford (born on May 23), also known as Naana Hayford Domfeh or Sofo Maame Naana Hayford, is a Ghanaian veteran actress, philanthropist, radio and TV presenter.

== Career ==
She is a veteran kumawood actress who featured in many Ghanaian Akan movies. She also worked as a TV show host and a radio presenter who worked with many TV and radio stations such as Fox FM, Ashh FM, Kessben FM and others.

== Filmography ==
She was featured in movie Catch them Young with Paulina Oduro, Dan Tei Mensah which was intended to remind Christians of the power of prayer.

== Personal life ==
Hayford is married and has three children of which two are male and one is a female. She was attack by armed robbers in her home in Kumasi. According to her son, David Portfolio Germain, he believes the killers were stalking and tracking every move of his mother after a tiring day.
