= 19th Africa Movie Academy Awards =

2023 film awards ceremony

The 2023 African Movie Academy Awards ceremony was held on 29 October 2023 at the Balmoral Center in Ikeja, Lagos. There ceremony was hosted by Nancy Isime, Rahama Sadau, and Richard Ato Turkson.

The nominees in 26 categories were announced in a ceremony held at the Saffron Hotel in Ikeja, Lagos on 21 September 2023 by the head of the jury, Keith Shiri.

== Winners and nominations ==
Efere Ozaka Award For Best Short Film

Lions (Ethiopia) – Winner

Riel (Namibia)

Enmity Djin (Mauritania)

Jubril Malaifia Award For Best Animation

Lost (Uganda)

Azania Rises (South Africa)

Jabari (Ghana) – Winner

Bashorum Gaa (Nigeria)

Best Documentary

Africa Cradle of Humanity and Modern Civilization (Senegal/Canada)

Nightlife in Lasgidi (Nigeria)

Maayo Wonaa Keerol – The River is not a Border (Senegal)

Ifine (Beauty) (Sierra Leone)

Le Spectre de Boko Haram (Cameroon) – Winner

Ousmane Sembene Award For Best Film In An African Language

Pusha Pressa Phanda (South Africa)

Anikulapo (Nigeria) – Winner

The Kitera Chronicle (Uganda)

Four Walls (South Africa)

Mami Wata (Nigeria)

Michael Anyiam Osigwe Award For Best Film By An African-Born Director Living Abroad

Talia’s Journey (Senegal/Belgium) – Christophe Rolin

Golden Stripes (Nigeria/UK) – Peace Osigbe

KOFA (Nigeria/Canada) – Jude Idada – Winner

Best Diaspora Short Film

We Were Meant To (United States) – directed by Tari Wariebi

The Ballad of Olive Morris (United Kingdom) – directed by Alex Kayode-Kay

Fifty-Four Days (United Kingdom) – directed by Cat White and Phoebe Torrance

Sponsored Stories

Raw Materials (Jamaica) – Directed by Sosiessia Nixon – Winner

Best Diaspora Documentary

Sound of the Police (United States) – Directed by Stanley Nelson – Winner

Fantastico Negrito – Have You Lost Your Mind Yet (United States) – directed by Yvan Iturriaga and Francisco Nuñez

Black Rio (Brazil) – directed by Fernando Sousa and Gabriel Barbosa

Best Diaspora Narrative Feature

Cheese (Trinidad & Tobago) – directed by Damian Marcano

Our Father, The Devil (United States) – Directed by Ellie Foumbi – Winner

The Pastor and the Revolutionary (Brazil) – directed by José Eduardo Belmonte

Best Achievement in Production Design

Pat Nebo – Anikulapo – Nigeria – Winner

Eve Martin – Omen – DRC

Sira – Burkina Faso

Antoine Nshimiyimana – Fight Like a Girl – Rwanda

Chantel Carter – Gereza – South Africa

Best Achievement in Costume Design

Bunmi Demilola Fashina – Mami Wata – Nigeria

Toyin Bifarin Ogundeji – Anikulapo – Nigeria

Millicent Jack – 4-4-44 (Four Four Forty-Four) – Nigeria

Djibril Drame – Xalé – Senegal – Winner

Elkehoste and Baloji Omen – DRC

Sidi Ouedraogo Sira – Burkina Faso

Best Achievement in Make-Up

Campell Precious Arebamen – Mami Wata – Nigeria – Winner

Hakeem Effect and Toyin Bifarin Ogundeji – Anikulapo – Nigeria

Lila Vander Elst – Omen – DRC

Our Lady of the Chinese Shop – Angola

Omowunmi Okungbure – Gangs of Lagos – Nigeria

Best Achievement in Soundtrack

Fight Like a Girl – Rwanda – Winner

L’Axe Lourd (The Highway) – Cameroon

Gereza – South Africa

Omen – DRC

Obinna Arua – 4-4-44 (Four Four Forty-Four) – Nigeria

Best Achievement in Visual Effects

Andrej Gregori, Voranc Kumar, Ziga Radulji -Omen – DRC

Alexandre Dachkevitch – Mami Wata – Nigeria

Josh Borrill – The Trade – Nigeria

Emmanuel Bassey – Gangs of Lagos – Nigeria – Winner

Best Achievement in Sound

Juliana Oswald – Our Lady of the Chinese Shop – Angola

Vianney Aube – Sira – Burkina Faso – Winner

Erik Griekspoor – Omen – DRC

Related News

Samy Bardet – Mami Wata – Nigeria

Michel Tsagli – Xalé – Senegal

Best Achievement in Cinematography

Lilis Soares – Mami Wata – Nigeria – Winner

Joachim Philippe – Omen – DRC

Richard Henkels – Fight Like a Girl – Rwanda

Thomas Wilski – Talia’s Journey – Senegal/Belgium

Eduardo Kropotkine – Our Lady of the Chinese Shop – Angola

Best Achievement in Editing

Nathan Delannoy – Mami Wata – Nigeria

Bertrand Conard – Omen – DRC – Winner

Sylvie Gadner – Sira – Burkina Faso

Layla Swart – Gereza

Madhew Leutwyler – Fight Like a Girl

Best Achievement in Screenplay

C.J. ‘Fiery’ Obasi – Mami Wata – Nigeria

Ufuoma MeHHri – 4-4-44 (Four Four Forty-Four) – Nigeria

Moussa Sene Absa, Pierre Magny, Ben Diogay Beye – Xalé – Senegal – Winner

Madhew Leutwyler – Fight Like a Girl – Rwanda

National Film and Video Censors Board (NFVB) Award for Best Nigerian Film

Mami Wata – Winner

Anikulapo

4-4-44 (Four Four Forty-Four)

Gangs of Lagos

The Trade

L.I.F.E.

Brotherhood

Best Young/Promising Actor

Maleek Sanni – Gangs of Lagos – Winner

Ewube -L’axe Lourd (The Highway

Darisimi Nadi – Obara’m

Sanou Titiama – Le chant des fusils (The Song of the Rifle

Eyiyemi Afolyan – Anikulapo

Best Actor in a Supporting Role

Francis Onwuchei – The Trade – Nigeria

Jeff Jackson – Four Walls – South Africa

Hakeem Kae-Kazim – Fight Like a Girl – Rwanda

Jimmy-Jean Louis – Rise – Winner

Best Actress in a Supporting Role

Uzoamaka Aniunoh – Mami Wata – Nigeria

Rokhaya Niang – Xalé – Senegal – Winner

Clarck Natmbwe – Fight Like a Girl – Rwanda

Best Actor in a Leading Role

Richard Mofe Demalo – 4-4-44 (Four Four Forty-Four) – Nigeria

Marc Zunga – Omen – DRC

Fenando Kamugisha – The Fallen Advocate –Uganda

Tobi Bakre – Brotherhood – Nigeria – Winner

Justine Murichii – Shimoni – Kenya

Mike Danon – Sira – Burkina Faso

Best Actress in a Leading Role

Lucie Debay – Omen – DRC

Ehle Mbali Mlotshwa – 4 Walls – South Africa

Nafissatou Sisse – Sira – Burkina Faso

Adesua Etomi – Guns of Lagos – Nigeria

Nse Ikpe Etim – 4-4-44 (Four Four Forty-Four) – Nigeria – Winner

Bimbo Ademoye – Anikulapo – Nigeria

Ama Qamata – Fight Like a Girl – Rwanda

First Debut Feature by a Director

Baloji – Omen – DRC – Winner

Ery Claver – Our Lady of the Chinese Shop – Angola

Jean Elliot Ilboudo (le Chant des fusils)The Song of the Riffle – Cameron

Best Director

Moussa Sene Absa – Xalé

C.J. ‘Fiery’ Obasi – Mami Wata

Baloji – Omen

Apolline Traore – Sira – Winner

Izu Ojukwu – 4-4-44 (Four Four Forty-Four)

Kunle Afolayan – Anikulapo

Kgosana Monchusi, Menzi Mzimela, Juvaiś Dunn – 4 Walls

Best Film

Xalé- Senegal – Winner

Mami Wata – Nigeria

4-4-44 (Four Four Forty-Four) Nigeria

Omen – DRC

4 Walls – South Africa

Sira – Burkina Faso

Anikulapo – Nigeria
