= Chika Anadu =

Nigerian filmmaker

- Born: November 1980 (age 45); Lagos, Nigeria.
- Citizenship: Nigerian
- Occupation: Film Maker
- Known for: Film B for Boy (2013)
- Notable work: Ava; The Marriage Factor; B for Boy; Going Home

Chika Anadu is a Nigerian filmmaker best known for the film B for Boy (2013). She has also written and produced several short films. Anadu's films are known for tackling issues of gender discrimination and cultural pressures surrounding tradition in Nigeria.

== Early life ==
Chika Anadu was born November 1980 in Lagos State, located in the southwestern region of Nigeria. When she was 16, she moved to England to continue her education. While there, she did her 'A' Levels, completed her first degree in Law and Criminology, and got an MA in African Studies: Human and Sustainable Development. In an interview with the New York Film Academy, Anadu states that she loved films throughout her early life, but it was not until 2006 that she thought of being a director as a realistic career for herself. Anadu went back to Nigeria in 2006 to complete her National Youth Service Corps (NYSC) program, a compulsory government work program for Nigerian citizens with university degrees. During her stay, she saw the Italian film Cinema Paradiso (1988) and was struck by the desire to become a director.

== Career ==
Anadu moved back to Nigeria in 2008 and began work in TV and film production. Unsatisfied with her experience, Anadu started writing and shooting her own short films in October and November 2009. Her first short film, Epilogue (2009), was shown at the 2010 San Diego Black Film Festival in the United States. Ava (2010) was shown in the Cannes Film Festival's Short Film Corner in 2010.

In 2010, the New York Film Academy came to Nigeria for the first time, offering month-long workshops in directing, acting, screenwriting, and camera work. Anadu chose to enroll in the screenwriting workshop instead of directing, despite knowing that she wanted to be a director. During this time, Anadu applied to the Cannes Cinéfondation Residence Program in Paris. The 14-page screenplay treatment that was part of her submission was the basis for what would become her first feature-length film, B for Boy (2013). Anadu secured one of the six spots and moved to Paris to take part. She wrote the screenplay for B for Boy (2013) during her two-and-a-half-week stay.

Anadu produced the film with her independent company No Blondes Production. The film was shot in 17 days, with Anadu working as director, writer, producer, casting director, location scout, accountant, and lawyer. The film was funded entirely by family money, Anadu's family contributing 70% of the cost, while her producing partner Arie Esiri's family contributed the remaining 30%. B for Boy (2013) premiered internationally at the BFI London Film Festival in 2013. It was also shown at the AFI Fest where it won the AFI Fest 2013 Breakthrough Award with a $5,000 cash prize. The film's South African premiere was held in Durban on July 19, 2014.

== Filmography ==
Year	Film
2009	Epilogue
2010	Ava
2012	The Marriage Factor
2013	B for Boy
2015	Going Home
2020	Shine Your Eyes
2023	I Do Not Come to You by Chance

== See also ==
- List of Nigerian film producers
