= Africa Movie Academy Award for Most Promising Actor =

Film award category

The Africa Movie Academy Award for Most Promising Actor is an annual merit by the Africa Film Academy to recognize emerging talents in the African cinema. The category has been renamed and merged severally since it was first awarded in 2006.

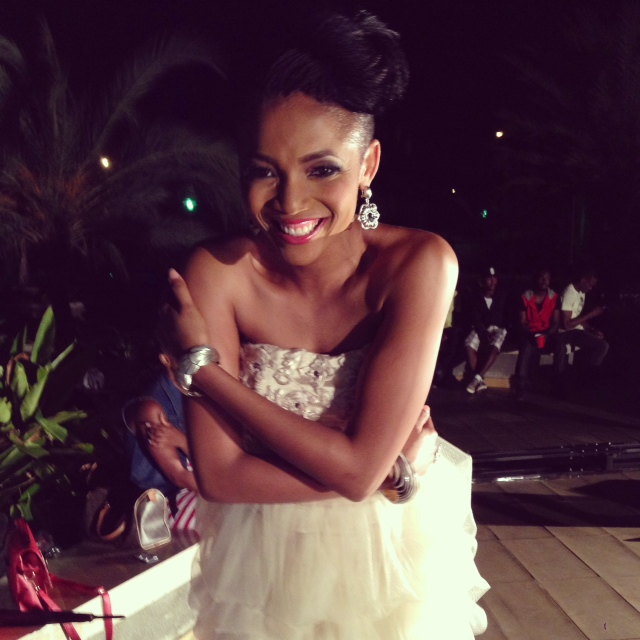
2010 AMAA winner Chelsea Eze

Best Young Actor
Year	Nominees	Film	Result
2006	Sam Anyamela	Day of Atonement	Won
2006	Akume Akume	Rising Moon	Nominated
2006	Kalu Ikeagwu	Fragile Pain	Nominated
2006	Alagie Sarr	Arrou (Prevention)	Nominated
2006	Tendal Musoni	Tanyaradzwa	Won
2006	Chika Ike	To Love a Stranger	Nominated
2006	Lilian Ikpe	Behind Closed Door	Nominated
2006	Elezra Ofori	My Mother’s Heart	Nominated
2007	Ali Nuhu	Sitanda	Won
2007	Amzat Abdel Hakim	Abeni	Nominated
2007	Mbong Odungide	The Amazing Grace	Nominated
2007	Moumouni Sanou	Mokili	Nominated
2008	OC Ukeje & Jibril Hoomsuk (co-winners)	White Waters	Won
2008	Maleke Idowu	Checkpoint	Nominated
2008	Van Vicker	Princess Tyra & Return of Beyonce	Nominated
2008	Kunle Fawole	Cash Money	Nominated
2008	Krossin	New Jerusalem	Nominated
2008	Uju Okeke	Mission To Nowhere	Won
2008	Jackie Appiah	Princess Tyra	Nominated
2008	Yvonne Nelson	Princess Tyra	Nominated
2009	Litha Booi	Gugu and Andile	Won
2009	Mavila Anthana Keriario	Battle of the Soul	Nominated
2009	Ruffy Samuel	Dead End	Nominated
2009	Segun Adefila	Arugba	Nominated
2009	Sheriff Ramzy	Seventh Heaven	Nominated
2009	Lungelo Dhladha	Gugu and Andile	Won
2009	Bhaira Mcwizu	Cindy’s Note	Nominated
2009	Bukola Awoyemi	Arugba	Nominated
2009	Lydia Forson	Scorned	Nominated
2009	Béa Flore Mfouemoun	Mah Sa-Sah	Nominated
2010	Wilson Maina	Togetherness Supreme	Won
2010	Wole Ojo	The Child	Nominated
2010	John Dumelo	Heart of Men	Nominated
2010	Pethro Tumba Mbole	A Game of my Life	Nominated
2010	Sunny Chikezie	Lilies of the Ghetto	Nominated
2010	Chelsea Eze (co-winner)	Silent Scandals	Won
2010	Rehema Nanfuka (co-winner)	Imani	Won
2010	Martha Kisaka	Togetherness Supreme	Nominated
2010	Martha Ankomah	Sins of the Soul	Nominated
2010	Ashionye Michelle Ugboh	Jungle Ride	Nominated
2011	Edward Kagutuzi	Mirror Boy	Won
2011	Yves Dusenge & Roger Nsengiyumua	Africa United	Nominated
2011	Samson Odhiambo & Leila Dayan Opou	Soul Boy	Nominated
2011	Donovan Adams	Shirley Adams	Nominated
2011	Junior Singo	Hopeville	Nominated
2012	Ivie Okujaye	Alero’s Symphony	Won
2012	Neo Ntatleno	State of Violence	Nominated
2012	Iyobosa Olaye	Adesuwa	Nominated
2012	Martha Ankomah	Somewhere in Africa	Nominated
2012	Thomas Gumede	Otelo Burning	Nominated
2012	Sihle Xaba	Otelo Burning	Nominated
2013	Belinda Effah	Kokomma (co-winner)	Won
2013	Joseph Wairimu	Nairobi Half Life (co-winner)	Won
2013	Sumela Maculuva	Virgin Magarida	Nominated
2013	Shonelo Mbutho	Ulanga The Mark	Nominated
2013	Karoumwi Olakunle	The Twin Sword	Nominated
2014	Petronella Tshuma	Of Good Report	Won
2014	Evelyn Galle Ansah	Good Old Days: For the Love of AA	Nominated
2014	Tope Tedela	A Mile from Home	Nominated
2014	Kitty Phillips	The Children of Troumatron	Nominated
2014	Shawn Faqua	The Twin Sword	Nominated
2015	Kemi Lala Akindoju	Dazzling Mirage (co-winner)	Won
2015	Hassan Spike Insingoma	Boda Boda Thieves (co-winner)	Won
2015	Demola Adedoyin	October 1	Nominated
2015	Vinjeru Kamanga	Bella	Nominated
2015	Chiedza Mhende	Love The One You Love	Nominated
2016	Zubaidat Ibrahim Fagge	Dry	Won
2016	Nyanso Dzedze	Hear Me Move	Nominated
2016	Ophelia Klenam Dzidzornu	The Cursed Ones	Nominated
2016	Ifu Ennada	O-Town	Nominated
2016	Eve Esin	Oshimiri	Nominated
2017	Madina Nalwanga	Queen of Katwe	Won
2017	Paballo Koza	Dora’s Peace	Nominated
2017	Azwille Shanane-Madiba	Vaya	Nominated
2017	Austin Rose	Call Me Thief	Nominated
2017	Adam Kanyama	While We Live	Nominated
2018	Anine Lansari	The Blessed Vost	Won
2018	Patrick Dibuah	Banana Island Ghost	Nominated
2018	Austin Enabulele	In My Country	Nominated
2018	Cindy Sanyu	Bella	Nominated
2018	Maurice Paige	Pop Lock ‘N’ Roll	Nominated
2018	Nichole Ozioma Banna	Icheke Oku	Nominated
2018	Zainab Balogun	Sylvia	Nominated
2019	Cynthia Dankwa	The Burial of Kojo	Won
2019	Catherine Credo	Fatuma	Nominated
2019	Youssef Alaoui	Urgent	Nominated
2019	Angel Onyinyechi Unigwe	Light in the Dark	Nominated
2019	Emilio Bilo	Mabata Bata	Nominated
2019	Jamma Ibrahim	The Delivery Boy	Nominated
2020	Faith Fidel	The Fisherman's Diary	Won
2020	Naomi Nemlin	Desrances	Nominated
2020	Chimezie Imo	Nimbe	Nominated
2020	Swanky JKA	Living in Bondage: Breaking Free	Nominated
2020	Wayne Smith	Fiela’s Child	Nominated
2020	Cina Soul	Gold Coast Lounge	Nominated
2020	Anthonieta Kalunta	The Milkmaid	Nominated
2021	Wilmah Muremera	Shaina	Won
2021	Oluwabamike Olawunmi-Adenibuyan	Collision Course	Nominated
2021	Faith Fidel	Where I Come From	Nominated
2021	David Weda	Bangarang	Nominated
2021	Hannah Sukali	Fatsani: A Tale Of Survival	Nominated
2021	Bertha Abdallah	Nyara (The Kidnapping)	Nominated
2022	Amina Mohammed	Ayaanle	Won
2022	Emmanuel Afffadzi	Borga	Nominated
2022	Kebirungi Agnes Knight	Tinka's Story	Nominated
2022	Maryam Waziri Salihu	Almajiri	Nominated
2022	Samke Makhaba	Surviving Gaza	Nominated
2022	Emmanuel Kuye	Ba Ni (Mud Clan)	Nominated
2023	Maleek Sanni	Gangs of Lagos	Won
2023	Jennifer Ewube	L’axe Lourd (The Highway)	Nominated
2023	Darisimi Nadi	Obara'm	Nominated
2023	Sanou Titiama	Le chant des fusils (The Song of the Rifles)	Nominated
2023	Eyiyemi Afolayan	Anikulapo	Nominated
2024	Michelle Lemuya	Nawi	Pending
2024	Likohna Mgali	The Queenstown Kings	Pending
2024	Agape Mngomezulu	Orah	Pending
2024	William Dias	Bokwagter	Pending
2024	Kofi Adu-Gyamfi	Tejiri	Pending
2024	Ruby Akubueze	She	Pending
2024	Fatima Muhammed	Mai Martaba	Pending
