= 40 Sticks =

2020 Kenyan thriller film

- Directed by: Victor Gatonye
- Written by: Frank Maina, Voline Ogutu
- Produced by: Lucas Bikedo, Cutha Gathere, Sarah Hassan, Fakii Liwali, Betty Mutua
- Starring: Shiviske Shivisi, Robert Agengo, Mwaura Bilal, Cajetan Boy, Andreo Kamau, Arabron Nyyeneque, Ywaya Xavier
- Production company: Sense Play
- Release date: 20 November 2020
- Running time: 92 minutes
- Country: Kenya
- Language: Swahili

40 Sticks is a 2020 Kenyan thriller film produced by SensePLAY, a Kenyan audio-visual production house, an arm of Password Ventures Ltd. It premiered on Netflix on November 20, 2020, showing in Africa, US, UK, Canada, New Zealand and Australia. 40 Sticks is the fourth Kenyan film to premiere on Netflix in 2020, after Poacher, Sincerely Daisy and Disconnect. The story was created by Frank G. Maina, and written together with Voline Ogutu, and directed by Victor Gatonye.

40 Sticks was executive produced by Anthony Macharia, Lucas Bikedo, Betty M. Mutua and Fakii Liwali.

== Plot ==
40 Sticks revolves around the story of a group of death row prisoners trapped in a prison bus that crashes, and their struggle to survive. Their misery is worsened by wild animals in the forest and a mysterious killer that lurks in the shadows. The story ends with all the prisoners mysteriously killed.

== Cast ==
- Robert Agengoas Pablo
- Mwaura Bilal as Biggie
- Cajetan Boy as Reverend
- Andreo Kamau as Mustafa
- Arabron Nyyneque as Amigo
- Shiviske Shivisi as Dakari / Leah
- Xavier Ywaya as Majuju
- Maina wa Ndung'u as Driver
- Mumbi Maina as Martha
- Zawadi Kayyoh as Stacy
- Gerald Langiri as Jacob

== Production ==
The film is produced by SensePlay in partnership with Film Studios Kenya, Bingi Media and Ogopa Inc. It was shot in Nairobi across 5 locations over a 16-day shoot period in February 2019.

== Nominations and Awards ==
Year	Festival	Category	Recipient	Result	Reference
2020	Kalasha International Film and TV Awards	Best Lead Actor Film	Robert Agengo	Nominee	
2020	Kalasha International Film and TV Awards	Best Feature Film	Sarah Hassan	Winner	
2020	Kalasha International Film and TV Awards	Best Supporting Actor in Film	Cajetan Boy	Winner	
2020	Kalasha International Film and TV Awards	Best Supporting Actor in Film	Arabron Nyyeneque	Nominee	
2020	Kalasha International Film and TV Awards	Best Director	Victor Gatonye	Winner	
2020	Kalasha International Film and TV Awards	Best Editor	Edwin Nyongesa	Winner	
2020	Kalasha International Film and TV Awards	Best Sound Design	Lucas Bikedo	Winner	
2020	Kalasha International Film and TV Awards	Best Original Score	Lucas Bikedo	Nominee	
2020	Kalasha International Film and TV Awards	Best Production Designer	Siteiya Warui	Winner	
2020	Kalasha International Film and TV Awards	Best Original Screenplay	Frank Maina, Voline Ogutu	Winner	
2020	Kalasha International Film and TV Awards	Best Lighting Technician	Walter Odhiambo	Winner	
2020	Kalasha International Film and TV Awards	Best Special Effects	Grace Murema	Winner	
2020	Kisima Music and Film Awards	Africa Best Feature Film		Nominee	
2020	Kisima Music and Film Awards	Africa Best Director	Victor Gatonye	Winner	
2020	Kisima Music and Film Awards	Africa Best Producer	Fakii Liwali	Winner	
2020	Kisima Music and Film Awards	Africa Best Lead Actor Film	Robert Agengo	Winner	
2020	Kisima Music and Film Awards	Best Supporting Actor Film	Cajetan Boy	Winner	
2020	Kisima Music and Film Awards	Best Supporting Actor Film	Arabron Nyyeneque	Nominee	
2020	Kisima Music and Film Awards	Best Cinematography	Enos Olik	Nominee	
2020	Kisima Music and Film Awards	Special Award Kenya: Best Feature Film Local		Nominee	
2020	African Movie Academy Awards	Best Actor in a Leading Role	Robert Agengo, Mwaura Bilal, Andreo Kamau, Ywaya Xavier	Nominee	
2020	African Movie Academy Awards	Best Actor in a Supporting Role	Arabron Nyyeneque	Nominee	
2020	African Movie Academy Awards	Best Director	Victor Gatonye	Nominee	
2020	African Movie Academy Awards	Best Film	Sarah Hassan	Nominee	
2020	African Movie Academy Awards	Best Screenplay	Frank Maina, Voline Ogutu	Nominee	
2020	African Movie Academy Awards	Best Cinematography	Enos Olik	Nominee	
2020	African Movie Academy Awards	Best Editing	Edwin Nyongesa	Nominee	
2020	African Movie Academy Awards	Best Sound	Lucas Bikedo	Nominee	
