= Princess on a Hill season 1 =

Princess on a Hill
- Season 1
- Starring: Norbert Young; Efa Iwara; Ireti Doyle; Femi Jacobs; Onyinye Odokoro; Bimbo Manuel; Andrew Yaw Bunting; Mimi Chaka
- No. of episodes: 10

Release
- Original network: Showmax
- Original release: 7 November 2024 – 9 January 2025

The first season of the Showmax Original television drama series Princess on a Hill, premiered on 7 November 2024. The series was created by Abiola Sobo, and Tolu Ajayi, and produced by Folashayo Oke-Sobo. Chuka Ejorh, Folashayo Oke-Sobo, Tolu Ajayi, and Abiola Sobo served as the series' executive producers for Blink Studios, Suss Productions, and Saga City, starring Norbert Young, Efa Iwara, Ireti Doyle, Femi Jacobs, Onyinye Odokoro, Bimbo Manuel, Andrew Yaw Bunting, and Mimi Chaka.

== Plot ==
Princess on a Hill tells the story of Zara Osara, a young woman with big dreams who unexpectedly rises to the pinnacle of corporate power through a reality show competition she won, and makes her debut in the most powerful boardroom in the country. She must save the company from decline, while resisting the dark influence of the enigmatic tyrant pulling her strings.

== Cast and characters ==
=== Main ===
- Onyinye Odokoro as Zara Osara
- Bimbo Manuel as Moyosore Lawson
- Efa Iwara as Oz Obiora
- Mimi Chaka as Tolani Ivy Baker
- Ireti Doyle as Madam Obiora
- Femi Jacobs as Denloye
- Andrew Yaw Bunting as Menny
- Norbert Young as Etim Etim

=== Supporting ===
- Toyin Oshinaike as Saheed
- Simi Drey as Kiki Jones
- Peter Oghenekaro as Chidi
- Ibrahim Suleiman as Asuquo
- Fadesaye Olateru-Olagbegi as Oyinkan
- John Kolawole as Mr Bello
- Tunde Daniels as Adegbite
- Emeka Golden as Kidnapper
- Kazeem Akanji as Sam Edet
- Honey Bamiro as Rolly
- Chibuikem Chris as Paul
- Austin Nonyelu as Mr Momoh
- Francis Onwuchei as Lawyer Odu
- Patrick Diabuah as Nkongho
- Seun Ajayi as Kayode
- Kingsley Chukwu as Mr Osita
- Eric Emeka as PJ
- Kayode Ojuolape as Korede
- Oladapo Carew as Mr Osara
- Olayemi Soyeju as Ruth Braithwaite
- Sunday Baba as Adamu Garba
- Victoria Akpan as Lawson executive
- Nonso Bassey as Folusho "Damilola Lawson" Dada

== Episodes ==
No. overall	No. in season	Title	Directed by	Written by	Original release date
1	1	TBA	Abiola Sobo, Tolu Ajayi	Bibi Ukpo	7 November 2024
After winning a corporate reality show despite being an underdog, Zara Osara is thrust into a world of corporate intrigue and power struggles.
2	2	TBA	Abiola Sobo, Tolu Ajayi	Adeniyi Adeniji	14 November 2024
Zara is thrust into a world of corporate intrigue when Moyosore Lawson offers her power in exchange for navigating ruthless challenges, including sabotaging a colleague.
3	3	TBA	Abiola Sobo, Tolu Ajay	Sonia Nwosu	21 November 2024
Zara navigates rising tension with Tolani over her new role, receives a covert assignment from Lawson to gather intel at a high-stakes social event.
4	4	TBA	Abiola Sobo, Tolu Ajay	Adeniyi Adeniji	28 November 2024
Zara excels in her role under Lawson's mentorship, but after enacting personal revenge and setting up Etim-Etim in a scandal, she struggles with guilt.
5	5	TBA	Abiola Sobo, Tolu Ajay	Sonia Nwosu	5 December 2024
Etim-Etim steps down as CEO, causing the Group's stocks to plummet, while Zara, overwhelmed with guilt over her role in recent events, tries to break ties with Lawson.
6	6	TBA	Abiola Sobo, Tolu Ajay	Bibi Ukpo	12 December 2024
Tolani forms an alliance with Zara in exchange for job security, but Zara keeps this from Lawson as tensions with her family grow, her relationship with Menny worsens.
7	7	TBA	Abiola Sobo, Tolu Ajay	Adeniyi Adeniji	19 December 2024
As Zara suspects Madame Obiora's ulterior motives in locating the Lawson heir and grapples with the implications of her relationship with Izzy, she receives unsettling assignments.
8	8	TBA	Abiola Sobo, Tolu Ajay	Adeniyi Adeniji	26 December 2024
Zara helps orchestrate Madame Obiora's downfall in a scandal worse than Etim-Etim's, leading to a tense confrontation with Izzy as he realizes her complicity.
9	9	TBA	Abiola Sobo, Tolu Ajay	Adeniyi Adeniji	2 January 2025
As news of Madame Obiora's downfall and Lawson's triumphant return dominates the media, Zara becomes uneasy about Lawson's deception, especially as he reasserts control.
10	10	TBA	Abiola Sobo, Tolu Ajay	Bibi Ukpo	9 January 2025
Zara uncovers shocking truths about Lawson and his attempted murder, leading her to confront him with her findings, which leaves Lawson emotionally compromised.

== Production ==
=== Filming ===
On 4 September 2024, at the 2024 MIP Africa in Cape Town, an announcement was made by Showmax before the official teaser of Princess on a Hill was released, crediting Tolu Ajayi and Abiola Sobo as the creators of the series. Princess on a Hill, premiered in November 2024.

=== Casting ===
The cast was revealed on 14 October 2024 by Showmax, following the release of the official trailer for Princess on a Hill, with a line-up including Onyinye Odokoro, Bimbo Manuel, Efa Iwara, Mimi Chaka, Ireti Doyle, Femi Jacobs, Andrew Yaw Bunting, and Norbert Young.

== Premiere and release ==
On 14 October 2024, Showmax released the official trailer for Princess on a Hill. On 30 October 2024, Showmax announced that Princess on a Hill would premiere on 7 November 2024 at the 13th edition of the Africa International Film Festival. On 7 November 2024, Princess on a Hill was released on Showmax.
