= Uche Mac-Auley =

Nigerian actress, writer, and film producer

- Born: Uchechukwu Nwaneamaka; Delta State, Nigeria
- Education: Delta State University, Abraka
- Occupations: Actress; Children's author Movie producer
- Years active: 1991-Present
- Spouse: Solomon Mac-Auley

Uche Mac-Auley (born Uchechukwu Nwaneamaka Mobuogwu), also formerly known as Uche Obi Osotule, is a Nigerian writer, film producer and a veteran actress. She was born on 6 June 1971.

== Early life and education ==
Mac-Auley is from Delta State in Nigeria which is a south-south geographical area of Nigeria predominantly occupied by the minority tribes as well as the Igbo people of Nigeria. Mac-Auley attained her First School Leaving Certificate from Osoro Primary School and for secondary school education attended Anglican Girls Grammar School and Idia College where she obtained her WAEC certificate from. Mac-Auley graduated from Delta State University with a degree in English.

== Career ==
Mac-Auley has been described as a veteran actress and one of the pioneers of the Nigerian movie industry. Mac-Auley began acting in Nigerian movies long before it became as structured as it is today. The Guardian described Mac-Auley as a timeless actress and a quintessential thespian Mac-Auley debuted into the Nigerian movie industry with the 1991 Nigerian TV series titled Checkmate which was produced and directed by the now-deceased veteran producer Amaka Igwe where she played a significant role as a character named Nkemji, as the village beauty queen and featured alongside Nollywood actors such as Richard Mofe-Damijo, Norbert Young, Francis Agu, Bimbo Manuel, Kunle Bamtefa, and Binta Ayo Mogaji. In the book titled The Creation of Nigerian Film Genres, by American author Jonathan Haynes, Mac-Auley was cited amongst the earliest faces to appear in the Nigerian movie industry before it was structured as well as a pioneer of the Nigerian movie industry. Mac-Auley took a long break from acting to become a children's story book writer but returned to acting in 2016 when she featured in a movie titled Mid-Life. she launched her online TV Elialand.

Besides being an actor, Mac-Auley is also a children's writer, scriptwriter and movie producer, and has produced the movies: Dangerous Twins, Sins of my Mother and In a Lifetime.

== Personal life ==
Mac-Auley has been married twice. First, she married Nollywood movie producer Obi Osotule who she met in 1993 on the set of a movie titled Unforgiven Sin. Mac-Auley then divorced Obi Osotule in 2002 and in 2006 married Solomon Mac-Auley.

Mac-Auley debuted in the Nigerian movie industry with the name "Uche Osotule" of which "Osotule" was her husband's surname at the time. When she remarried, she changed her last name to "Mac-Auley" which is the last name of her current husband.

== Selected filmography and TV series ==
- Unforgiven Sin (1991)
- Checkmate (1991) as Nkemji
- Another Love (1996)
- Obstacles (1998)
- Saving Alero (2001)
- Thunderbolt: Magun (2001) as Ngozi
- The Return (2003)
- Images in the Mirror (2004) as Ada
- Another New day (2005)
- Mid Life Blues (2016)
- Hush (2016-2017)
- 5th Floor (2017) as Whenu
- Wife Hunter (2018) as Itohan
- MTV Shuga (2019)
- Unbreakable (2019) as Dr. Tebowei
- Win a Heart (2020) as Keseina
- Dede's Bride (2021) as Enujioke
- Crime and Justice Lagos (2022)
- Over Her Dead Body (2022)
