= List of Nigerian films of 2004 =

This is a list of Nigerian films released in 2004.

== Films ==
Title	Director	Cast	Genre	Notes	Ref
2004
Fateful Love	Simi Opeoluwa	Ramsey Nouah Omotola Jalade Ekeinde Paul Obazele Uche Amah Abriel	Romance	Made in 2 parts and produced by Andy Best Electronics	
Goodbye New York 1 and 2	Tchidi Chikere	Genevieve Nnaji Jim lyke Rita Dominic Chidi Mokeme	Drama	Shot in English Language, Igbo Language and Pidgin Released on DVD by A2Z Movies International.	
Home and Abroad	Lancelot Imasuen	John Okafor Victor Oswuagwu Izoya Isaac Rita Azenobor		Shot in English Language and Pidgin Released on DVD by Lancewealth Images and Ehizoya Golden Ent./Videofield.	
Last Girl Standing 1 and 2	John Uche	Jim Iyke Stepahnie Okereke Robert Peters Empress Njamah	Drama / Romance	Shot in English Language Released on VCD by Konia Concept/P. M. O. Global.	
Missing Angel	Charles Novia	Stella Damasus Aboderin Desmond Elliot Empress Njamah Nobert Young	Drama / Fantasy / Horror / Romance		
The Mayors	Dickson Iroegbu	Richard Mofe-Damijo Sam Dede Segun Arinze Mike Ezuruonye	Drama	This film won the Best Picture award at the Africa Movie Academy Awards in 2005.	
The London Boy	Simi Opeoluwa	Ramsey Nouah Simone McIntyre Segun Arinze Uche Amah Abriiel	Drama / Romance	Made in 2 parts and produced by Andy Best Electronics	
London Forever	Chico Ejiro	Shan George Lanre Falana Lilian Bach Rachel Oniga	Thriller	Released on VCD	
Mr Ibu in London	Adim Williams	John Okafor Ishola Oshun Kareem Adepoju Femi Falana	Comedy	Released on VCD by Kas-Vid and Soft Touch Movies.	

== See also ==
- List of Nigerian films
