= Funlola Aofiyebi-Raimi =

Nigerian actress

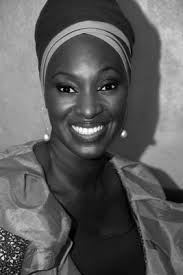
- Aofiyebi-Raimi in 2010
- Born: Abibat Oluwafunmilola Aofiyebi
- Other name: FAR
- Occupation: Actress
- Years active: 1996 – present
- Known for: Tinsel
- Spouse: Olayinka Raimi

Funlola Aofiyebi-Raimi (born Abibat Oluwafunmilola Aofiyebi), also known as FAR, is a Nigerian actress. She is known for her role in the film The Figurine and her appearances in the television shows Tinsel and MTV Shuga.

== Early and personal life ==
Funlola is the last of seven children, born to a businesswoman mother and an entrepreneur father. The name FAR came after she got married and has become her signature. FAR had an early start on stage and television, with her aunt Teni Aofiyebi, a veteran actress. She is married to advertising guru Olayinka Raimi. Due to the death of her brother, she decided to stay off social media for some time and later return.

== Career ==
FAR took a TV acting course at Westminster College and at the Actors Studio in Buckinghamshire. She also has a BSc in sociology from the University of Lagos in Nigeria. FAR's film debut was in Amaka Igwe's film Violated acting alongside Joke Silva, Richard Mofe Damijo, Ego Boyo, and Kunle Bamtefa. She was nominated for the THEMA best upcoming actress award in 1996. FAR was cast as the lead character in Keeping Faith by director Steve Gukas. FAR was nominated for an AMMA best supporting actress award for The Figurine directed by Kunle Afolayan. Before appearing in the M-Net TV show Tinsel, playing Brenda, FAR has featured on other drama shows like Doctors Quarters, Solitaire, and Palace. FAR has acted on stage in Sing That Old Song For Me and The Mansion, written by Rasheed Badamusi, and also The Vagina Monologues. FAR won a dance reality show called Celebrity Takes 2. In 2014, FAR co-starred with British-Nigerian actor Wale Ojo.

She worked in broadcasting as a producer and a presenter of a radio show called Touch of Spice for 14 years (started in August 1999).

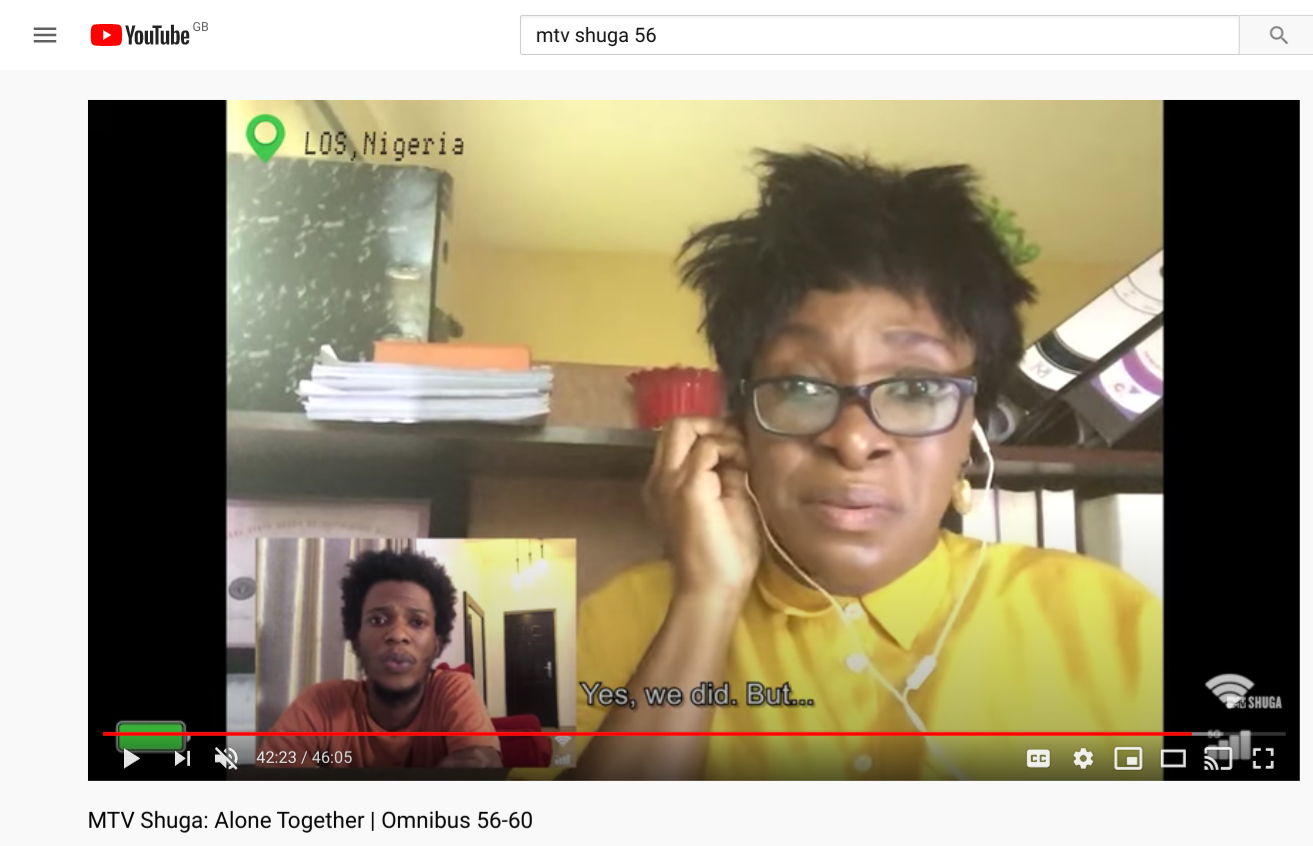
Mrs Olutu in MTV Shuga "Alone Together" in 2020

FAR was in MTV Shuga in 2019 and 2020 and her supporting role of "Mrs Olutu" was included when it went into a mini-series titled MTV Shuga Alone Together, highlighting the problems of coronavirus on 20 April 2020. The series was written by Tunde Aladese and broadcast every weeknight; its backers include the United Nations. The series was based in Nigeria, South Africa, Kenya, and Côte d'Ivoire, and the story progresses using on-line conversations on location between the characters. All of the filming was done by the actors who include Lerato Walaza, Mamarumo Marokane, Jemima Osunde, Folu Storms, and FAR.

In August 2009, she celebrated the 10-year anniversary of her radio program Touch of Spice (TOS). She promised to do it in grand style by making available a free train trip for her fans to go watch a movie at the cinema.

Her longest running appearance on television is on the Pan African Network M-Net daily soap - Tinsel, where she has for 10 seasons played the role as Brenda Mensah - nominated at the 2010 Nigerian Entertainment Awards, New York (NEA) for Best Actress in a TV Show. A dance enthusiast, Funlola won the maiden edition of a dance reality show, Celebrity Takes 2 in 2007, beating 9 other Nigerian celebrities to the top spot. She attends film festivals on a regular basis and has been contracted as a goodwill ambassador for both Black Star International Film Festival (Ghana) and Real Time Film Festival (Nigeria). Aofiyebi-Raimi has launched a talent competition tagged 'Go Far With Talent' for aspiring actors to celebrate her two decades in the Nigerian movie industry.

== Filmography ==
Year	Title	Role
1996	Violated	Ese
2002	Keeping Faith: Is That Love?	
2008	Comrade	Doctor
2009	The Figurine	Linda
2008	Tinsel (2008–present)	Brenda Nana Mensah
2015	Grey Dawn	Jessica
2016	Entreat	Sharon
2017	Dry Fish	Waitress
2017	Tatu	
2018	King of Boys	Aisha
2018	We Don't Live Here Anymore	Nike Balujaye
9043	Walking with Shadows	Mum
2023	Adire	Folashade
2024	Criminal	Dr. Amaka
2024	Tokunbo	Folashade

== Awards ==
Year	Award	Category	Result	Ref
2010	Africa Movie Academy Awards (AMAA)	Best Actress in a Supporting Role (Figurine)	Nominated	
2010	Nigeria Entertainment Awards	Best Actress in a TV Show (Tinsel)	Nominated	
2017	Best of Nollywood Awards	Best Supporting Actress –English	Nominated	
2018	Best of Nollywood Awards	Best Actress in a Lead Role - English	Nominated	
