= Crime and Justice Lagos =

Nigerian TV series

- Genre: mystery-crime, & drama
- Written by: Kola Munis; Chidi Ifeanyi Barbara; Segun Michaels; Oluwapemi Elujoba Bifarin
- Directed by: Mak 'Kusare; Onyinye Egenti
- Starring: Folu Storms; Ibrahim Jammal; Margaret Osuome; Paul Adams; Uche Mac-Auley; Ejiroghene Jyro Asagba; Femi Durojaiye; Makinde Adeniran
- Composer: Kulanen Ikyo
- Country of origin: Nigeria
- Original languages: English, Igbo, Yoruba, Hausa
- No. of seasons: 1
- No. of episodes: 6

Production
- Executive producer: Yinka Edward
- Producer: Eustace Okwechime
- Editor: Daniel Tom
- Running time: 55–60 minutes
- Production company: Coal Water

Original release
- Network: Showmax
- Release: 8 December 2022 – present

Related
- Crime and Justice

Crime and Justice Lagos is a 2022 Nigerian Showmax Original mystery, crime, and drama series, starring Folu Storms, Ibrahim Jammal, Margaret Osuome, Paul Adams, Uche Mac-Auley, Ejiroghene Jyro Asagba, Femi Durojaiye, and Makinde Adeniran.

Crime and Justice Lagos is a spin-off from the Crime and Justice series franchise co-produced by Showmax, and Canal+.

== Plot ==
Crime and Justice Lagos revolves around the activities of the fictional Serious and Special Crimes Unit working in Lagos.

== Cast ==
- Folu Storms as Kelechi Farasin
- Ibrahim Jammal as Danladi Dikko
- Margaret Osuome as Simi
- Paul Adams
- Uche Mac-Auley as Dr. Aggy
- Ejiroghene Jyro Asagba
- Femi Durojaiye as DSP Jangfa
- Makinde Adeniran
- William Benson as Femi Biboye
- Stephen Okoboh as Tony Akpata
- Bridget Chigbufue as Mrs. Oredo

== Episode ==
Each episode is released weekly, every Thursday on Showmax starting from 8 December 2022.

Season	Episodes	Originally released	
Season	Episodes	First released	Last released
1	6	December 8, 2022	January 12, 2023

=== Season 1 (2022-23) ===
No.	Title	Directed by	Written by	Original release date
1	"Zero"	Mak 'Kusare	Kola Munis	8 December 2022
The SSCU is called in when a man’s body is found in a hotel room with a knife sticking out of his chest, his ring finger amputated, and his genitals in his left hand. The investigation narrows on Mayenne, who they discover had been in the hotel room that morning. Mayenne confesses to receiving a tip-off on her husband's philandering. She'd rushed in a blind rage to the hotel. Too late - he was dead. She panics and flees. Ex-wife Kemi provides a lead - Austin's membership of Prime Cult, their old university confraternity. Investigations reveal the cult is still active with shadowy members now in government and business. KC and Danny's spotlight quickly falls on Tony Akpata, business partner and close 'friend' of Austin and a full member of the Prime Cult. Suddenly, Veno turns up dead and her boyfriend Tami is on the run. Tami is a 'white bead' - an aspiring full member of Prime Cult. Veno was set up to drug Austin by Tami on Tony's instructions. Tony is arrested, tried, and found guilty of murdering Austin.
2	"Sliced"	Mak 'Kusare	Chidi Ifeanyi Barbara	15 December 2022
When six-year-old Esohe is kidnapped on the way to school, the SSCU is called in to investigate. Their investigation leads them to the local tricycle taxi rank. Suddenly, the driver zooms off with Esohe inside - kidnapped. The SSCU is called in to investigate. They trace the driver to a local bar but as he runs off he is hit and killed by a truck. Soon after Esohe's family receives a ransom note. Kelechi and Danny raise the money and the drop-off is arranged. It all goes disastrously wrong. Papa Esohe is left stranded as the kidnappers make a clean getaway with the money. Esohe is still nowhere to be found. Soon after, Esohe's body is discovered in a refuse dump. An autopsy reveals she had been genitally mutilated. Kelechi and Danny generate a list of local 'slicers'. One name pops up - Esohe's aunty, Grace. They raid Grace's house and find her all packed, about to leave town. In court, it emerges that Grace, her sister Clara and Esohe's grandmother are behind it all. Esohe had unexpectedly bled to death and the fake kidnap story was to cover their tracks. Riddled with guilt, Clara ensured they were caught by dumping the body in a public refuse dump.
3	"Oro"	Mak 'Kusare	Segun Michaels	22 December 2022
A young woman witnesses the death of two women during the Oro festival. Two young women alight from a taxi one dark evening a little drunk. Too late, they have landed bang in the middle of the dreaded 'Oro' procession. The women are struck dead and their bodies spirited away. Unknown to the Oro, the crime is witnessed by another young lady, Shalewa, hiding nearby. She inadvertently attracts the attention of the lead masquerade who quickly discovers where she is hiding, raises his staff to strike her dead but inexplicably turns away. Next morning the SSCU's Kelechi and Danny are on the scene. The Oro is widely feared and witnesses are reluctant to come forward. Kelechi finds Shalewa, but her father Kamoru refuses to allow her to testify, afraid of an Oro backlash. After difficult negotiations with the local chiefs, an agreement is reached for the Oro and its lead masquerade to come in for questioning - and eventually court - in ceremonial masks. Their lawyer argues that the masquerades are spirits and cannot be tried as mere mortals. Kelechi however is convinced she knows the masquerade's true identity. The judge pronounces them innocent, and as they triumphantly proceed out of the courtroom, Kelechi defiantly calls out his name. He is Kamoru, Shalewa's father.
4	"Clash"	Onyinye Egenti	Chidi Ifeanyi Barbara	29 December 2022
This episode is inspired by true events. A group of young friends die tragically after being 'mistaken' for robbers.
5	"Harvesters"	Onyinye Egenti	Oluwapemi Elujoba Bifarin	5 January 2023
The SSCU go after the illegal organ trade when a missing 12-year-old boy returns home with a nasty scar on his back, a wad of money in his pockets, and his kidney removed.
6	"Deadnappers"	Yinka Edward	Kola Munis	12 January 2023
The SSCU is called in to investigate a spate of missing bodies from the local mortuary after a family discovers that the body of their late mother was removed from the grave.

== Production and release ==
The series executive producer is Yinka Edward, with the help of producer Eustace Okwechime, co-producer Kola Munis, and director Mak 'Kusare. Crime and Justice Lagos was set in the formal capital of Nigeria, Lagos State and released on Showmax on 8 December 2022, with the official premiere being held at Genesis Cinema, Maryland Lagos on December 6. In attendance at the premiere, were the cast, other Nollywood actors, and the Executive Head of Content and West Africa Channels at MultiChoice Nigeria, Dr. Busola Tejumola.

Dr. Busola Tejumola at the official premiere, described the show, saying “ is unlike any other Nigerian Original we have put out. We’ve created a crime series that captures the pulse of the city – from its glitzy clubs to its grimy ghettos – through the lens of law enforcement agents tasked with keeping its citizens safe. Each episode mirrors real crime stories that audiences will connect with and will give them a lot to ponder about." Opeoluwa Filani, General Manager of Showmax Nigeria, says “the series demonstrates the streaming service’s commitment to telling authentic African stories.”

== Reception ==
=== Critical and audience response ===
Professional ratings
Review scores
Source	Rating
Premium Times	8/10

Crime and Justice Lagos has received favourable reviews from the public and critics. According to Premium Times writer Shola-Adido Oladotun, wrote “With a stellar lineup of incredible talents and a promising concept, Crime and Justice Lagos reminds us of The Third Eye; a crime drama series aired on NTA from 1990-1993, starring veteran actor Olu Jacobs” and said “The six-part series has so much potential to push Nollywood producers to explore other uncommon genres in the industry.”

== Awards and nominations ==
Year	Award	Category	Recipient	Result	Ref
2023	Africa Magic Viewers' Choice Awards	Best Art Director	Pat Nebo & Temple Chima Adighije	Nominated	
2023	Africa Magic Viewers' Choice Awards	Best Lighting Designer	Francis Wanyahdeh	Nominated	
2023	Africa Magic Viewers' Choice Awards	Best Picture Editor	Holmes Awa & Daniel Tom	Won	
2023	Africa Magic Viewers' Choice Awards	Best Cinematographer	Yinka Edward	Nominated	
2023	Africa Magic Viewers' Choice Awards	Best Television Series	Yinka Edward	Won	
