= Simi Drey =

Nigerian actress and TV presenter

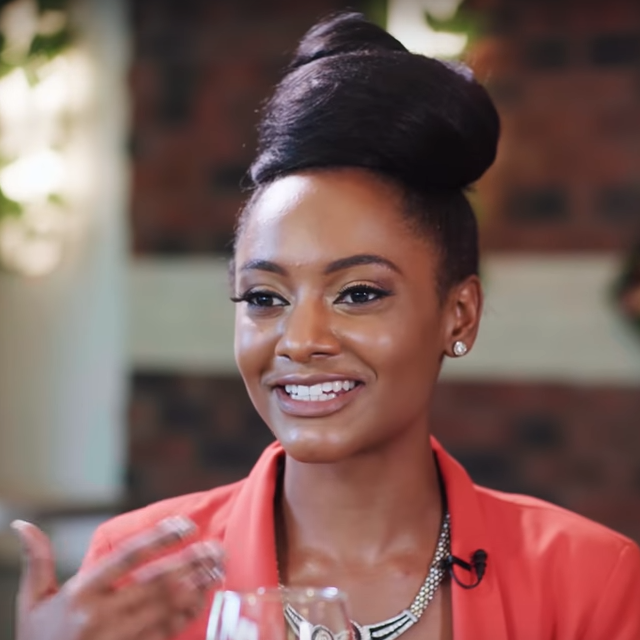
- Born: Simileoluwa Audrey Adejumo; 5 June 1992 (age 34); London, United Kingdom
- Education: University of Wales
- Occupations: Actress, TV presenter
- Years active: 2015–present
- Spouse: Julian Flosbach (2023)
- Family: Soji Adejumo (father)
- Awards: Future Awards Africa, Best OAP

Simileoluwa Audrey Adejumo popularly known as Simi Drey (born 5 June 1992) is a British-Nigerian actress, TV presenter and host. In 2019, she won the Future Awards Africa for Best OAP (TV/Radio). In 2016, she starred in the Nollywood TV series Tinsel, playing the role of Amanda.

== Biography ==
Simi Audrey Adejumo was born on 5 June in London, United Kingdom but originally hails from Ibadan, Oyo State, the lineage of Ologun Kutere . She was born as the eldest of five children to Professor David Olusoji Adejumo, the former Chairman of the Oyo State Universal Basic Education and Mrs. Emilomo Adejumo. Simi spent most of her childhood in the United Kingdom alongside her siblings. She also acquired her primary and secondary education there. Simi's great-grandfather, Professor Oladele Adebayo Ajose was a Lagos Prince who served as the first vice-chancellor of the Obafemi Awolowo University.

She was very close to her grandmother, Audrey Olatokunbo Ajose, a Nigerian lawyer and journalist who served as Nigeria's ambassador to Scandinavia from 1987 to 1991, and inspired Adejumo to pursue a career in Journalism. In 2014, she graduated with a First Class Degree in Broadcasting, Journalism and Media Communications from the University of Wales, United Kingdom.

== Career ==
Adejumo had the passion for broadcasting ever since she was a child. While in the university, she founded and worked as an editor for the student magazine, GMag. In 2011, while still in university, her career officially started when she got her first job at a radio station in Wales called Calon FM. In July that same year, she traveled to Nigeria and served as an intern at a television station HiTV, Lagos State. After the completion of her internship, she decided to relocate to Nigeria and continue her career there. Upon gaining her university degree in 2013, she relocated fully to Nigeria. After her NYSC, she worked with Cool TV for two years as the host of The Late Night Show, before joining Spice TV and hosting their flagship show, Bargain Hunters in 2016.

That same year, she starred in the Nollywood series The Governor, playing the role of Ify Ochello. She then went on to feature in the Nollywood's longest running TV series Tinsel. While on the set of Tinsel, she was accounted and cast for the role of Amanda in the film Happy Father's Day (2016) and its sequel Another Father's Day (2019).

In December 2016, she joined The Beat 99.9 FM where she hosted the Saturday and Sunday Morning show for three years before being moved to the weekday Morning Rush show which she co-hosted with Osikhena Dirisu. While at Beat FM, in collaboration with MTV Base, she was chosen to cover the MTV EMAs in Seville, Spain in December 2019.

In 2019, she returned to television and became a presenter for 53 Extra (formerly Studio 53) on Africa Magic until its final episode in 2020, after which she became the host of the show Movie Talk on African Movie Channels.

== Filmography ==
- The Governor (2016)
- Happy Father's Day (2016)
- Tinsel (2017)
- Another Father's Day (2019)
- A Lady and Her Lover (2021)
- Princess on a Hill (2024)

== Awards ==
Year	Title	Category	Result	Ref
2015	Trek African Women Awards	TV presenter of the year	Won	
2019	The Future Awards Africa	Prize for OAP	Won	
2019	ELOY Awards	Award for TV personality	Nominated	
2023	Icon Noble Awards	On Air personality of the year	Won	

== Personal life ==
In June 2022, Simi Drey got engaged to the founder of BFree, Julian Flosbach. The couple held their traditional marriage and white wedding ceremony in May 2023 in Ibadan and Lagos State, Nigeria respectively.
