= Ego Boyo =

Nigerian actress and film producer (born 1968)

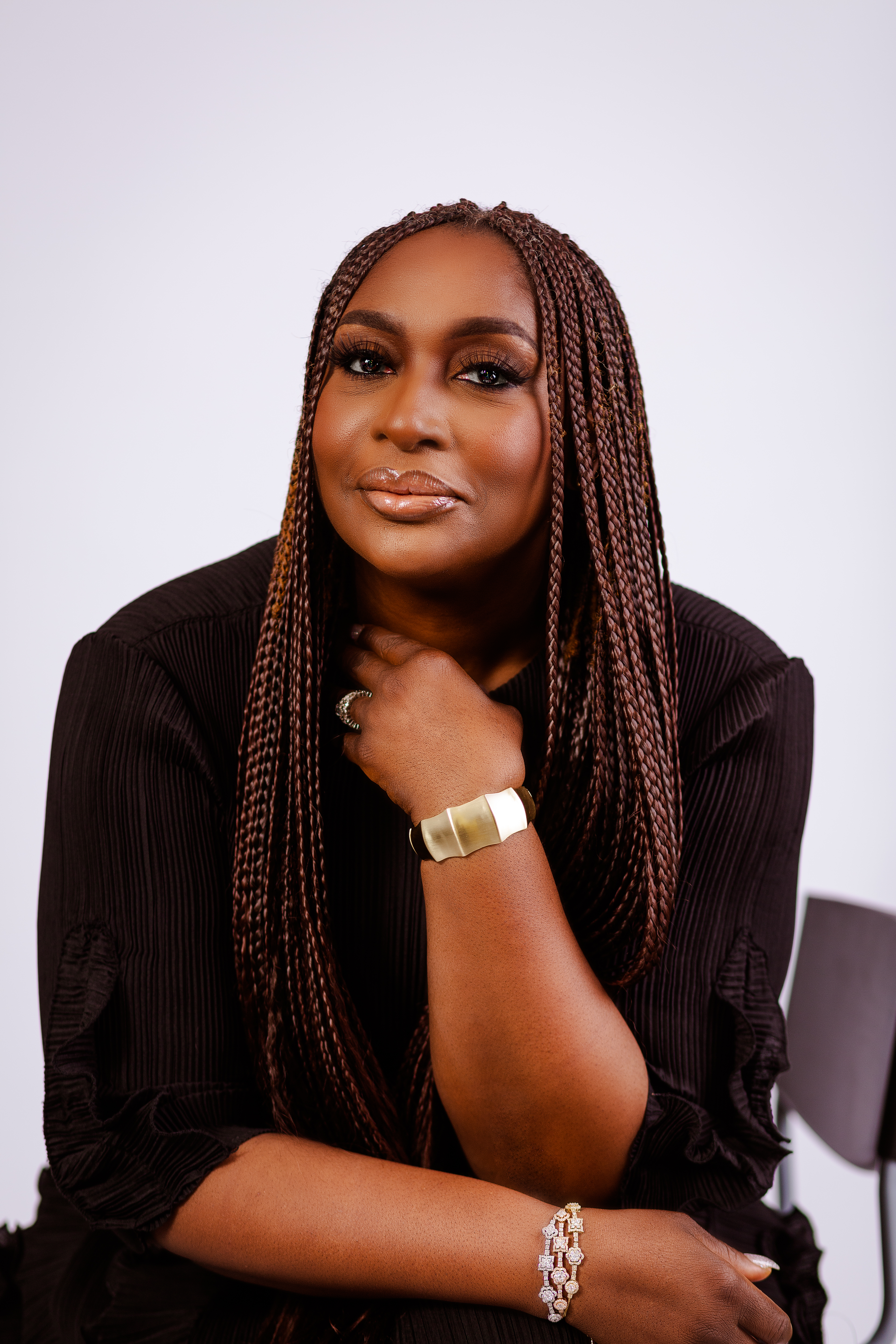
- Boyo in 2022
- Born: Nwakaego Nnamani; 6 September 1968 (age 58); Nigeria
- Citizenship: Nigeria; Barbados
- Education: University of Benin
- Occupations: Actress; filmmaker; entrepreneur
- Years active: 1991–present
- Works: Checkmate; The Ghost and The House Of Truth; A Hotel Called Memory
- Spouse: Omamofe Boyo
- Children: 3

President of the International Women's Society, Nigeria
- In office 2017–2018
- Preceded by: Izarene Adams
- Succeeded by: Abimbola Bawaallah
- Website: http://egoboyo.com/

Nwakaego (Ego) Boyo (née Nnamani; born 6 September 1968) is a Nigerian actress, producer, executive producer, and creative entrepreneur. She is best known for her role as Anne Haatrope in the early 1990s soap opera Checkmate. She is the founder and managing director of Temple Productions, Temple Films, and Temple Studio.

== Early life ==
Boyo was born in Queen Elizabeth Hospital, Umuahia, Nigeria, during the Nigerian Civil War to the family of Augustine Nnamani and Gloria Nnamani Nee Harewood.

She left Nigeria at just ten days old during the Nigerian Civil War and lived in Barbados for the first four years of her life before returning to Enugu in 1971. In 1976, her family moved to Lagos. She has a Bachelor of Arts in Theater Art from the University of Benin.

== Career ==
Boyo started her career in the early 1990s series Checkmate, where she played the character of Anne Haatrope, acting alongside Francis Agu and Richard Mofe Damijo.

=== 1995–1996 ===
After Checkmate wrapped up in 1995, Boyo started work with Amaka Igwe on the film Violated, which was released in 1996. Several members of the Checkmate cast and crew also worked on the film, which was well received by the audience. She started her own production company, Temple Productions, in 1996. Boyo is the founder and managing director of Temple Productions and Temple Media

=== 1998 ===
The studio was set up in 1998 with its first set of digital equipment, one of the first companies to do so as the industry made the gradual change from unstick equipment. In 1998, she bought digital equipment and opened an office on Dolphin Estate in Lagos with a staff of ten.

Temple's first major client was 'The Obasanjo For President' campaign in 1998, for which the company produced jingles, music videos, and advertisements. Other major corporate clients, including-dividing technical support for the industry, meant the company went on to great success.

=== 2017 ===
She produced the silent film A Hotel Called Memory in 2017, which won the audience award for best experimental film at the BlackStar Film Festival in Philadelphia. In 2019, she produced The Ghost and the House of Truth which was directed by Africa Movie Academy Award Winner Akin Omotoso. She was the 60th president of the International Women Society (IWS), an independent, non-political, non-governmental, and non-profit organisation founded in 1957.

== Advocacy ==
She was Global Rights Ambassador for Global Rights Nigeria, whose work focuses on combating sexual violence against women.

As the founder and trustee of Tempio Media Advocacy and Information Foundation, she is focused on highlighting women's education and women's healthcare. The foundation works with the non-governmental organizations on their visual messaging to help educate the less privileged. She has worked on documentary and advocacy videos focusing on maternal health as well as sexual assault. She is the chair of the advisory board of the Lagos Fringe Theatre Festival, a multidisciplinary festival which runs annually in Nigeria and encompasses the full spectrum of artistic diversities, and also on the governing board of the Mirabel Center, the first sexual assault referral center (SARC) in Nigeria.

As an advocate for education, Boyo was on the advisory board of Oando Foundation, which has founded schools across Nigeria to create a sustainable educational system that will empower pupils, and was a member of the Nigerian Oscar Selection committee.

She previously served as a member of the advisory board of the Oando Foundation and was the 60th president of the International Women’s Society and a member of the charity serving in multiple capacities. and a non-executive director on the board of Lagos Preparatory and Secondary School, Ikoyi, a private British curriculum school based in Lagos.

In 2024, Boyo was featured as one of Vogue UK's "Forces of Change," nominated by Chimamanda Ngozi Adichie, who commended her charity work focused on Nigerian's women education and healthcare.

== Personal life ==
Boyo has been married to Omamofe Boyo since 1992, who is the deputy group chief executive officer at Oando Plc. They have three children.

== Filmography ==
Year	Film	Role	Note	Award
1996	Violated	Producer and Actress	As Peggy	3 nominations (Thelma Awards)
1998	To Live Again	Producer and Actress	As Dr. Zainab	
2002	Keeping Faith	Producer and Executive Producer		
2007	30 Days	Producer and Executive Producer		
2017	A Hotel Called Memory	Producer and Executive Producer		AMAA Awards nominations Best Director, Best Editor, Best Film, Best Nigerian Film, Achievement in Sound and Sound Track
2018 - 2023	The Mr X Family Show	Actress	As Deka	
2019	The Ghost and the House of Truth	Executive Producer		Official Selection Urban World Film Festival New York 2019, Winner Best Narrative Feature Film ( World cinema)
2021	La Femme Anjola	Actress	As Yejide Johnson	
2022	Earth Woman	Co-executive producer		

== Awards and nominations ==
Year	Award Ceremony	Film	Nomination	Award	Ref
2017	Africa Movie Academy Awards	A Hotel called memory	-Best Achievement in sound & soundtrack -Best achievement in editing -Best editor -Best Film -Best Nigerian Film -Best Director	-Best sound & soundtrack, -Best Editor	
2019	AFRIFF	The Ghost and the House of Truth	-Closing night film -Best Nigerian Film (Official selection) -Best Director (Official selection) -Best Actress(Official selection)	-Best Nigerian Film -Best Director -Best Actress	
2019	Urbanworld Film Festival	The Ghost and the House of Truth	-Best world narrative feature(World cinema) -Film Festival (Official selection)	-Best world narrative feature	
