= Grey Dawn (film) =

2015 film by Shirley Frimpong-Manso

- Directed by: Shirley Frimpong-Manso
- Written by: Shirley Frimpong-Manso
- Produced by: Ken Attoh; Shirley Frimpong-Manso
- Starring: Bimbo Manuel; Funlola Aofiyebi-Raimi; Sika Osei; Marlon Mave
- Cinematography: Sadiq Al-Hassan
- Edited by: Shirley Frimpong-Manso
- Music by: Ivan Ayitey
- Production company: Sparrow Productions
- Distributed by: Silverbird Film Distributions; Sparrow Motion Picture Company
- Release date: 13 February 2015 (Ghana)
- Countries: Ghana; Nigeria
- Language: English

Grey Dawn is a 2015 Ghanaian-Nigerian drama film, co-produced and directed by Shirley Frimpong-Manso. It stars Bimbo Manuel, Funlola Aofiyebi-Raimi, Sika Osei and Marlon Mave. The film delves into complex issues surrounding immigration, politics, and societal norms within the Ghanaian context, reflecting a balance between personal dilemmas and social issues.

== Plot ==
The story follows a Ghanaian government minister Bimbo Manuel, whose political career is threatened when his father-in-law, an illegal immigrant, faces deportation. As the minister grapples with maintaining his political integrity while also preserving his family relationships, he is caught in a moral and emotional struggle. The narrative unpacks themes of loyalty, identity, and the price of ambition in modern-day Ghana.

== Cast ==
- Bimbo Manuel as Minister
- Funlola Aofiyebi-Raimi as Jessica Davies
- Sika Osei as Flora Davies
- Marlon Mave as Jacques Julien Diouf
- Kofi Middleton Mends as Kweku Yanka
- Ambrose Amexo as Eiifi
- Salomey Akromah as Esi
- Dorothy C. Adjei as Mona
- Irene Asamoah Siaw as Sally
- Lyn Ethel Bentil as Doreen
- Benjamin A. Mills as Reporter
- Derek W. Johnson as Newsreader 1
- Elsie Srodah as Newsreader 2
- Fred Kanebi as Newsreader 3
- Moesha Babiinoti Boduong as Betty
- Benjamin I.K.A as Sam Ampofo
