= Edochie =

- Language: Igbo

Origin
- Origin: Nigeria
- Meaning: replacement
- Region of origin: South East Nigeria

Edochie (//) is an Igbo surname of Nigerian origin meaning "replacement" in English. Notable people with the surname include:

- Pete Edochie (born 1947), Nigerian actor
- Rita Edochie (born 1964), Nigerian actress
- Yul Edochie (born 1982), Nigerian actor
