= Rekiya Yusuf =

Nigerian Nollywood actress

- Born: Rekiya Yusuf
- Occupation: Actress
- Known for: Exorcism of Alu (2019); Spotlight (2015)

Rekiya Yusuf is a Nigerian Nollywood actress. She was present at the launch of the African Movie Channel Original Productions (AMCOP), a production arm of the African Movie Channel (AMC) alongside other top Nollywood filmmakers.

== Career ==
She played the role of "Valerie" in Sunkanmi Adebayo's 2015 drama film, Spotlight, also starring Segun Arinze, Desmond Elliott, Omoni Oboli, and others.

In 2017, Nigeria's Guardian Newspapers published that the Nigerian filmmaker, John Njama, was set to direct a television drama series entitled, My Flatmates, to feature Rekiya Yusuf, Bright Okpocha (Basket Mouth), Steve Onu (Yaw), Okey Bakassi, Buchi the comedian, Emmanuel Ikubese, Scarlet Sotade, and Wofai.

She was nominated for a Best Actress (TV series) award at the second edition of the Ghana-Naija Showbiz Awards (GNSA), held in Lagos, Nigeria on October 14, 2018.

She was featured in Bright Okpocha's first feature 2019 horror film entitled, Exorcism of Alu, said to be screened across Nigerian cinemas from January 15. Other casts include Nigerian singer Sound Sultan and international casts such as Tevez Houston, Winona Crawford, Jamie Whitehouse, and others.

== Filmography ==
Year	Film	Role	Notes	Ref.
2021	The Governor's Daughter	Actress	Drama, Romance	
2021	To love, To forget	Actress	Drama, Romance	
2021	The Perfect Time	Actress	Romance	
2019	Girlfriends	Actress		
2019	Exorcism of Alu	Actress	Horror, Thriller	
2019	Sabotage	Cast	Crime	
2015	Full Cast & Crew: Spotlight (III)'	Actress (Valerie)	Drama	
2015	A soldier story	Nurse		
	TV series (My flatemates)	Mimi	Comedy	

== Accolades ==
Year	Event	Prize	Recipient	Result
2018	GNSA	Best Actress (TV series)	Herself	Nominated
2017	Ghana Showbiz	Best Actress in Comedy series		Won
2017	Maya Awards Africa	Best New Act		Nomination
