= Igodo: The Land of the Living Dead =

Igodo:The Land of the Living Dead
- Directed by: Andy Amenechi
- Produced by: Don Pedro Obaseki
- Release date: 1999
- Country: Nigeria
- Language: English

Igodo: The Land of the Living Dead is a 1999 Nigerian adventure film that was produced by Don Pedro Obaseki and directed Andy Amenechi.

== Plot ==
The movie tells the story of a village that is troubled by evil spirits and sorcery. The only way to stop these evil spirits was for the men in the village to go to the evil forest to recover a sword with amazing powers to fight evil spirits and powers in the village.

Igodo joins this quest to the evil forest. He traveled there with a group and returned alone. Most of his colleagues were killed and hunted down by the spirits and monsters of the evil forest who prevented them from finding the sword of amazing powers.

== Cast ==
The cast included:

- Sam Dede
- Pete Edochie
- Norbert Young
- Charles Okafor
- Prince James Uche
- Ignis Ekwe
- Obi Madubogwu
- Chidi Mokeme
- Joe Layode
