= Women's Cot =

Nigerian film

- Directed by: Dickson Iroegbu
- Release dates: 2005
- Country: Nigeria
- Language: English

Women's Cot is a Nigerian film that was directed by Dickson Iroegbu in 2005. It was produced by Great Future Productions.

== Plot ==
The movie recounts the story of a woman whose husband has died and has become a widow. As a result of this challenge, members of the family treat her badly, so she decides to be at the widow's cot as result of threats from family relatives. In Nigeria, cultural practice dictates that a man's family can collect all of the deceased property when he dies, leaving his widow destitute. The widows in this film form a powerful group to prevent this practice, but they however become corrupt. The movie is about women's rights, murder and marriage.

== Cast ==
- Bukky Ajayi
- Rita Edochie
- Chidi Ihesie
- Bimbo Manuel
- Onyeka Onwenu
- Zack Orji
- Joke Silva
