= Sola Onayiga =

Nigerian film actress (died 2022)

- Died: July 18, 2022; Lagos State University Teaching Hospital
- Other names: Ireti; Kitchen practicals
- Citizenship: Nigeria
- Education: Obafemi Awolowo University
- Occupation: Film actress

Sola Onayiga (née Awojobi) was a Nigerian actress best known for her character role (Ireti) in Fuji House of Commotion.

== Education ==
Sola Onayiga studied Theatre Arts at Obafemi Awolowo University.

== Career ==
Onayiga acted in several radio plays and soaps. Her first act on radio play was Gandu Street where she acted as Madam Sikira. Her first television act was in a soap opera titled Checkmate. Her character role in Fuji House of Commotion made her popular as Ireti.

== Personal life ==
Sola Onayiga died on July 18, 2022, at the Lagos State University Teaching Hospital.

== Filmography ==
- Gandu Street - as Madam Sikira
- Oragbala - as Olori Debomi
- The King Must Dance Naked - as Mama Odosu
- Fuji House of Commotion - as Ireti
- Checkmate
- Movement-Japa (2021)
