= Green White Green =

- Directed by: Abba Makama
- Produced by: Abba Makama
- Starring: Ifeanyi Dike; Jammal Ibrahim; Samuel Robinson
- Release date: 30 September 2016
- Country: Nigeria
- Language: English

Green White Green is a 2016 Nigerian coming of age film revolving around three teenagers, who seem on an interminably long wait for university. The film was released in film festivals.

== Plot ==
Three teenagers seem to be on an interminably long wait for university. In the hiatus, they carry on with various shenanigans. Uzzie tries his hand on becoming an artist, his friend Segun keeps a bag packed for an always impending trip to New York and the other one tries to make his father believe in and respect him.

Their 'lounging and chilling' sessions help the audience understand what drives the average young Nigerian; the audience sees the American and hip-hop influence, the Boko Haram issue, the hankering after 'going abroad' and the lack of direction that sometimes leads young people down the wrong path.

A group of Ajegunle boys are described as 'Future Thugs' and one of them actually looks in the camera and says – 'Make you look me o, I no well o' which sort of sums up the mental state of many young Nigerians driven half-mad by disillusion and the mess their parents have made of the country.

Green White Green is produced and directed by Abba Makama. It stars Ifeanyi Dike, Samuel Robinson and Jammal Ibrahim.

== Cast ==
- Ifeanyi Dike as Uzoma
- Jammal Ibrahim as Baba
- Samuel Robinson as Segun
- Crystabel Goddy as Maggie
- Erick Didie as Badmus
- Victor Gwan as The Robot
- Bimbo Manuel as Prof. Ogunde
- Okey Uzoeshi as Chuks
- Omoye Uzamere as Adejoke Adunbarin

== Release and reception ==
Green White Green was released in Nigeria on 30 September 2016 at the Lights Camera Africa Film Festival in Lagos, following a screening at the Toronto International Film Festival.

The film was described as "scrappy and clever" by Now Toronto and as "Meta-Nollywood" by Screen Daily.
