= Checkmate (Nigerian TV series) =

Nigerian TV drama series

- Created by: Amaka Igwe
- Country of origin: Nigeria
- Original language: English

Production
- Production company: Moving Movies

Original release
- Network: NTA
- Release: April 4, 1991 – 1994

Checkmate is a Nigerian television serial that ran from Thursday, April 4, 1991 to 1994, created by Amaka Igwe and sponsored by Lever Brothers Nigeria. It starred Ego Nnamani, Francis Agu, Bob-Manuel Udokwu, Mildred Iweka, Kunle Bamtefa, and Richard Mofe Damijo Set in Lagos, the story focuses on the Haatrope family, the enemies determined to destroy their business and legacy, and their friends and associates. Checkmate is seen in the show's opening credits, where a chess player's king is directly attacked by an opponent's pawn, making escape impossible.

The show's opening and ending theme is Ron Goodwin's main theme for the 1964 war film 633 Squadron, and the main character - Ann Haatrope - is loosely based on Queen Amina of Zaria.

== Plot ==
Ann Haatrope (Ego Nnamani, and briefly Yomi Davies) returns to Lagos from America with her brother Richie (Bob-Manuel Udokwu) to discover the family's infrastructure and investment firm, Haatrope Investment, is on the brink of collapse due to older brother Benny's (Francis Agu) incompetence caused by alcoholism and sloth. Benny is also violent towards his wife, the equally nefarious Tonye (Edyth-Jane Azu) who does not approve of her husband's siblings living under their roof, and is particularly horrid towards Nana Kofo (Ruth Osu), the elderly Ghanaian housekeeper who has served the family for years. With their father Richard Sr. critically ill back in America and Richie lacking experience, Ann is determined to restore the company's reputation and fight off competition from scheming rivals, most notably the unscrupulous Segun Kadiri (Richard Mofe-Damijo) who bears a long-time grudge towards the Haatropes. He blames them for his descent into childhood poverty following his mother's death, and has sworn vengeance.

Ann's best friend, banker Ada Okereke (Mildred Iweka), is married to school teacher Nduka (Bimbo Manuel), but the couple face several problems including their class difference (Ada is the daughter of wealthy parents while Nduka is from a more humble background), Nduka's jealousy, and Ada's inability to conceive. Ada is later revealed to be an osu which infuriates Nduka's mother (Obiageli Molube) who refuses to accept an 'untouchable' as her daughter-in-law, and is on a mission to break up the couple. Nkemji (Uche Mobuogwu), an uncouth teenager from family friend Peace Fuji's village, is brought into her son's home as his new spouse but Nduka, who would later work for Haatrope Investment, rejects her as he loves his wife dearly. Nduka is also jealous of the friendship between his wife and her old university boyfriend Kunle Ajayi (Paul Adams), a Haatrope Investment employee with unrequited love for his boss Ann.

Serial womaniser Chief Fuji (Kunle Bamtefa), a board member at Haatrope Investment and close friend of Segun, is head of a dysfunctional family which consists of numerous children and his two warring wives Mama Moji (Toun Oni) and Peace (Pauline Njoku). Fuji flaunts his status as a wealthy polygamist, but shuns his financial responsibilities towards his offspring to the chagrin of his spouses, mistresses, and girlfriends including the daughter of his machete-wielding tenant Alika (Victor Eze). The situation is not helped when Fuji marries Ireti (Sola Onayiga), a trainee caterer who comes under fire from the rest of the Fuji clan for her sophisticated cuisine which does not suit the family's simpler tastes. The hypocritical Fuji continues his womanising but remains a strict disciplinarian with his children who are forbidden from leaving the house without permission or dating.

University lecturer Monday Edem (Zulu Adigwe and later Norbert Young), is notorious for sleeping with his female students in exchange for high grades, but continuously denies accusations when confronted. His long-suffering wife Eno (Tammy Abusi) continues to support him, but becomes increasingly frustrated. Their son Akpan (Tunde Euba), Richie's best friend since secondary school, is a student at the university also ashamed of his father's antics and is tired of defending him. Akpan soon finds himself in the middle of a raging rivalry between the institution's two main secret cults after he takes an interest in Remi (Yetunde Olorunfunmi), the reluctant girlfriend of hot-headed gang member Banky (Kevin Ushi). With both father and son facing the wrath of their enemies on campus, the Edem family's safety constantly comes under threat - his younger brother is stabbed, his sister nearly raped, and an altercation with Banky's gang nearly costs Akpan his eyesight. He later joins rival cult The Jets, and the arrival of a mystery relative believed to be the professor's secret daughter throws the Edems into further chaos.

== Cast ==
- Ego Nnamani (later credited as Ego Boyo) - Ann Haatrope #1
- Yomi Davies - Ann Haatrope #2
- Francis Agu - Benebo 'Benny' Haatrope
- Bob-Manuel Udokwu - Richard 'Richie' Haatrope
- Edyth-Jane Azu - Tonye Haatrope
- Ruth Osu - Nana Kofo
- Richard Mofe Damijo - Segun Kadiri
- Kanayo O. Kanayo - Okosun
- Mildred Iweka - Adaobi 'Ada' Okereke
- Bimbo Manuel - Nduka Okereke
- Obiageli Molobe - 'Mama Nduka' Okereke
- Uche Mac-Auley (credited as Uche Mobuogwu) - Nkemji Okereke
- Kunle Bamtefa - Chief Tajudeen 'T.A.' Fuji
- Toun Oni - 'Iya Moji' Fuji
- Pauline Njoku - Peace Fuji
- Sola Onayiga - Ireti Fuji
- Jude Orhorha - Gbenro Fuji
- John Njamah - Rabiu Fuji
- Gloriana Nwankwo - Jumoke Fuji
- Zulu Adigwe - Monday Edem #1
- Norbert Young - Monday Edem #2
- Tammy Abusi - Eno Edem
- Tunde Euba - Akpan Edem
- Paul Adams - Kunle Ajayi
- Anne Njemanze - Temi Badmus
- Binta Ayo Mogaji
- Chukwudi Onu
- Nkem Owoh
- Ayo Adesanya
- Alex Usifo

== Reception ==
Checkmate has been hailed as part of the "golden age of television in Nigeria", prior to the Nollywood home-video boom of the mid-1990s. Several of these alumni were associated with this and went on to achieve success in the film era.

In 2001, nearly seven years after the serial ended, Checkmate became one of the few Nigerian shows to produce a spin-off - Fuji House of Commotion - a sitcom centred around Chief Fuji's dysfunctional family.
