= Queen Moremi: The Musical =

- Music: Kehinde Oritinehin
- Premiere: December 21, 2018: Terra Kulture Arena, Victoria Island, Lagos

Queen Moremi: The Musical is a 2018 Nigerian musical about 12th-century queen Moremi Ajasoro. The show was produced by Bolanle Austern-Peters Productions and the House of Oduduwa. It was directed by Bolanle Austen-Peters and produced by Joseph Umoibum. The show's music was composed by Kehinde Oritinehin.

== Productions ==
The idea for the musical came about in December 2017. Princess Ronke Ademiluyi approached Austern-Peters to direct the musical.

Paolo Sisiano and Justin Ezirin choreographed the show. House of Emisara provided jewelry for the production.

The shown premiered on December 21, 2018 and ran until January 2, 2019, at Terra Kulture Arena, Victoria Island.

In April 2019 a 'reloaded' version of the show returned to Lagos for a limited run from 18 April 2019 until 5 May 2019. The show had a third run that December, from 24 December 2019 until 2 January 2020.

== Premise ==
The musical follows the story of Moremi, the Yoruba queen who saved the people of Ile-Ife from the Ugbos, who sought to enslave them. She makes a pact with the goddess of River Esinmirin in order to find a way to defeat their enemies. She is later captured by the Ugbos, discovers their weakness, and then escapes and returns to Ile-Ife. She leads the final charge, successfully defeating the Ugbos. Esinmirin returns and demands Moremi give her "what is most dear to her".

== Cast ==
| Role | 2018-2019 Run | Reloaded: December 2019 |
|---|---|---|
| Queen Moremi | Tosin Adeyemi, Kehinde Bankole, Omotola Jalade-Ekehinde | |
| Obalufen | Deyemi Okanlawon | |
| Olugbo | Femi Branch | Femi Branch |
| Oranmiyan | Rotimi Adelegan | Ademiluyi Adelegan |
| Esimirin | Lala Akindoju | Mojisola Kadiri |
| Alaiyemore | | Toyin Oshinaike |
| Omoremi | | Princess Obuseh, Oluwafeyikemi Agbola |
| | Bamike Olawunmi | |
| | Bimbo Manuel | |
