= Madam Kofo =

Nigerian actress

- Born: Kofoworola Abiola Atanda
- Citizenship: Nigerian
- Occupation: Actress
- Notable work: The Campus Queen
- Awards: Special Recognition award at 2021 Best of Nollywood awards.

Kofoworola Abiola Atanda is a veteran Nigerian actress popularly known by the moniker Madam Kofo for her role in the soap opera, Second Chance where she became popular for her signature headgear.

== Career ==
Madam Kofo started her career acting in stage productions by Hubert Ogunde and disclosed that her highest earning in her prime was ₦10.

In 1991, she produced a film titled Otu Omo which featured King Sunny Ade. She was awarded the special recognition award at 2021 Best of Nollywood awards.

== Filmography ==
- Mortal Inheritance (1996) as Mrs Johnson
- Second Chance
- Winds of Destiny
- The Campus Queen (2004)
- The Narrow Path (2006)
- Alter Ego (2017)
