= A Love Story (2016 film) =

- Directed by: Anushka Kishani Naanayakkara
- Written by: Anushka Kishani Naanayakkara, Elena Ruscombe-King
- Produced by: Khaled Gad
- Cinematography: Yinka Edward, Alvilde Horjen Naterstad
- Edited by: Joseph Comar
- Music by: Victor Hugo Fumagalli
- Release date: 2016
- Running time: 7 minutes
- Country: United Kingdom

A Love Story is a 2016 animated short film directed by Anushka Kishani Naanayakkara and produced by Khaled Gad.

When you think about it, there are a lot of yarn-related phrases that are used to describe how we feel. "They tied the knot", "Relationship is settled", "I just lost the thread". A great choice of material then for Anushka Kishni Nanayakara's tactile-stop-motion short, which has a woolly head as its protagonist.

== Awards ==
Year	Presenter/Festival	Award/Category	Status
12 February 2017	70th British Academy Film Awards	British Short Animation	Won
