= Movement-Japa =

2021 Nigerian television series by Femi Odugbemi

- Directed by: Lanre Olupona
- Written by: Bode Asiyanbi
- Story by: Bode Asiyanbi
- Produced by: Femi Odugbemi
- Starring: Chioma Agwunobi; Valerie Dish; Ese Hammond; Chris iheuwa Adjetey Anang
- Cinematography: Agbo Kelly
- Edited by: Yemi Jolaoso
- Production company: zuri 24 media
- Release dates: 1 November 2021 (Lagos premiere); 1 November 2021 (Nigeria)
- Running time: 30 minutes
- Country: Nigeria
- Language: English

Movement - Japa is a Nigerian television series written by Bode Asiyanbi and produced by Femi Odugbemi. The series is centred mainly on the lives of Nigerian youths who were forced to marking critical and bad decisions due to challenges from the society.

== Synopsis ==
The series is about three friends who are in search of a better life but due to the challenges they faced the made bad decision and resulted to criminal acts.

== Premiere ==
The television show was premiered on November 1, 2021, by the production company Zuri 24 Media and African Magic of Multichoice Nigeria.

== Casts and crew ==
=== Crew ===
- Femi Odugbemi - Executive producer
- Lanre Olupona - Director
- Bode Asiyanbi - Writer
- Yemi Jolaoso - Editor
- Agbo Kelly - Cinematographer

=== Casts ===
- Chioma Agwunobi as Dr Colette
- Chris Iheuwa as Uncle Wille
- Ese Hammond as Ama
- Valerie Dish as Angela
- Adjetey Anang as Black Arrow
- Sambasa Nzeribe as Osas
- Gideon Okeke
- Sola Onayiga
- Okawa Shanznay as Mimi
