= A Hotel Called Memory =

- Directed by: Akin Omotoso
- Written by: Branwen Okpako
- Produced by: Ego Boyo
- Starring: Nse Ikpe-Etim; Mmabatho Montsho; Abdi Hussein
- Cinematography: Rob Wilson
- Production company: Temple Productions
- Release date: 19 November 2017 (Lagos)
- Running time: 49 minutes
- Country: Nigeria
- Language: English

A Hotel Called Memory is a 2017 Nollywood movie directed by Akin Omotoso. Notable for lacking dialogue, it has been called "Nigeria's first silent movie".

Set and shot on location in Lagos, Cape Town and Zanzibar, the movie tells the story of a woman who has divorced her husband in Lagos and decided to travel to some parts of the world for self-discovery. Written by Branwen Okpako, the film was produced by Ego Boyo and stars Nse Ikpe-Etim. It won the audience award for best experimental film at the BlackStar Film Festival in Philadelphia.
