= Over Her Dead Body (2022 film) =

2022 Nigerian comedy film

- Promotional poster
- Directed by: Sola Osofisan
- Starring: Nse Ikpe-Etim; Binta Ayo Mogaji; Adenike Ayodele; Patrick Dakota; Uche Mac-Auley; Greg "Teddy Bear" Ojefua; Shola onomor; Ibim ice Spa y
- Production company: Pen Pusher production
- Distributed by: Genesis
- Release date: 2022
- Country: Nigeria
- Language: English

Over Her Dead Body is a Nigerian comedy film about how mothers love their sons at the detriments of their daughters-in-law. The film was produced by the Pen Pusher production and distributed by a Nollywood distribution company known as Genesis. It was written, produced and directed by Sola Osofisan. It was released January 7, 2022.

== Plot ==
Zara's mother in-law after escaping death from highway thieves decides to stay with her son with the aim of taking care of her grandchildren. Upon arrival at their home, she discovers the couple doesn't have a child yet. Hence, she maltreats and pressures Zara to the extent that she has to fight back, which turns the house into a war zone.

== Cast ==
- Nse Ikpe-Etim as Zara
- Binta Ayo Mogaji as Mama
- Adenike Ayodele as Simbi
- Patrick Dakota as Sunday
- Onyeka Fiaka as Samson
- Taiwo Solanke as Ladi
- Uche Mac-Auley as Nneoma
- Greg 'Teddy Bear' Ojefua as Rasco
- Shola onomor as Muffy
- Ibim ice Spa as Sholay
