= Osikhena Dirisu =

Nigerian OAP and TV presenter

Osi Suave
- Born: Osikhena Dirisu; Lagos, Nigeria
- Education: Lagos State University University of Benin University of Lagos
- Occupation: Radio presenter
- Years active: 2007–present

Osikhena Dirisu popularly known as ‘Osi Suave’ (born 7 March) is a Nigerian radio presenter, author and media personality. He is known for hosting The Morning Rush and The Sauce with Osi. He is an On-Air Personality at The Beat 99.9 FM and the author of The Confessions of A Lagos Bachelor.

== Early life and education ==
Osikhena was born on 7 March in Lagos, Nigeria to Mr Andrew Dirisu and Dr Marie Dirisu. He is the eldest of four siblings and spent most of his childhood in Lagos. He also acquired his primary education in Lagos State and his secondary education from The Nigerian Navy Secondary School Abeokuta, Ogun State.

Later, he proceeded to the Lagos State University where he graduated with a Diploma in Law. In 2011, he graduated from the University of Benin, Nigeria with a Bachelor’s Degree in Sociology and Anthropology.

In 2014, he went to the University of Lagos for his postgraduate studies and graduated with a master's degree in sociology.

== Career ==
Osikhena passion for media and entertainment was influenced by his younger brother who always got him interested in music and music videos as kids. However, he started his career in 2007 as a radio personality at Silverbird Group's Rhythm 93.7FM, Benin City, Edo State, while he was in his second, as an undergraduate student at the University of Benin.

During his time at Rhythm 93.7FM, he created and started the show ‘SOUL’D OUT’, which ran until 2010, when he graduated from the university. That same year, he worked briefly with Rhythm 93.7FM Lagos as a Tech support intern during his NYSC year. In November 2011, Osikhena joined The Beat 99.9 FM as a radio presenter. In 2022, he became the Programmes Director for The Beat 99.9 FM.

In 2018, Osikhena wrote his first book The Confessions of a Lagos Bachelor. That same year, he was ranked as one of the top 100 most influential youths in Nigeria.

He was the presenter for the 2020 Headies Awards alongside Simi Drey, for best vocal performance (male) category.

== Bibliography ==
- The Confessions of Lagos Bachelor (2018).

== Awards ==
| Year | Title | Category | Result | Ref |
|---|---|---|---|---|
| 2012 | Young Entertainers and Music Awards | Radio personality of the year (male) | Won | |
| 2013 | CHASE Awards | Best OAP | Nominated | |
| 2013 | Nigerian Broadcasters Merit Awards | Outstanding Presenter of the Year (Radio) | Nominated | |
| 2017 | The Beatz Awards | Best OAP | Nominated | |
