= Branwen Okpako =

Nigerien filmmaker

Prof. Branwen Okpako
- Born: Branwen Kiemute Okpako; 25 February 1969 (age 57); Lagos, Nigeria
- Education: Bristol University; Deutsche Film- und Fernsehakademie Berlin
- Occupations: Director, producer, writer, editor, cinematographer
- Years active: 1995–present
- Spouse: Johannes Brandrup (div.)
- Awards: look career

Prof. Branwen Kiemute Okpako (born 25 February 1969), is a Nigerian–born Welsh German filmmaker. She is most notable as the director of critically acclaimed films The Education of Auma Obama, Dirt for Dinner and Landing. Apart from direction, she is also a writer, producer, cinematographer, film editor as well as a lecturer.

== Personal life ==
She was born on 25 February 1969 in Lagos, Nigeria. At the age of 16, she moved to Wales. In 1991, Okpako obtained her B.Sc. in political science from Bristol University, England and later followed a course of MFA equivalent in film directing from the German Film and Television Academy Berlin GmbH, Berlin (DFFB) in 1999.

She was married to Johannes Brandrup, where they later divorced.

== Career ==
While in the final year of the DFFB, she produced her maiden short film Dreckfresser in 2000. The film focused about the first black policeman in East Germany. The film won several international awards including First Steps: The German Newcomer Award for Documentary Film 2000, IG Media Award at Dok Leipzig in 2000, Distributions prize from Sales 2000. It also won the Best Newcomer Film Award at 24th Duisburg Film Week. In 2001, the film honored with Bavarian State Government Documentary Award “The Young Lion” and as the Best graduation film at the See Docs Dubrovnik festival.

In 2003, she made the fiction feature Tal der Ahnungslosen. The film had its world premiere at the Toronto International Film Festival in the same year and included in the feature film competition at Panafrican Film and Television Festival of Ouagadougou (FESPACO) in 2005. With the success of first two films, she made the documentary film Die Geschichte der Auma Obama in 2011, where the film received Viewers Choice Award at the Africa International Film Festival. The film partially based on the early life of former US-president Barack Obama, as Okpako is a close friend of Barack's older sister Auma Obama. In 2012, the film won Africa Movie Academy Awards for Best Diaspora Documentary as well as the Festival Founders Award for Best Documentary at the Pan African Film Festival in Los Angeles.

In 2014, Okpako made a documentary-drama film Fluch der Medea. The film focused about the life of the late German writer Christa Wolf. The film made the premier at the Berlin International Film Festival in the same year. Okpako also made several theater plays such as, Schwarz Tragen (2013), Maggie Burns (2009), Scramble Quiz Video (2008), Das Singende Kamel (2007), Bloodknot (2007), and Seh ich was, was Du nicht siehst (2002).

Apart from cinema, Okpako is full Professor in the Department of Cinema and Digital Media at University of California, Davis.

== Filmography ==
Year	Film	Role	Genre	Ref.
1995	Vorspiel	Director, writer, editor, producer	Film	
1997	Landing	Director, writer, editor, producer	Film	
1998	Searching for Taid	Director, writer	Film	
1999	LoveLoveLiebe	Director, writer	Film	
2000	Dreckfresser (Dirt for Dinner)	Director, writer, producer	TV movie documentary	
2003	Tal der Ahnungslosen (Valley of the Innocent)	Director, writer	Documentary	
2011	Die Geschichte der Auma Obama (The Education of Auma Obama)	Director, writer, editor, producer	Documentary	
2014	Fluch der Medea (Curse of Medea)	Director, writer, editor, cinematographer	Film	
2017	A Hotel Called Memory	Writer	Film	
TBD	Arbitrary Fairytales	Actress: Blue (voice)	Film	
