= Violated (1996 film) =

1996 Nigerian film

- Directed by: Amaka Igwe
- Written by: Amaka Igwe
- Screenplay by: Amaka Isaac-Ene
- Produced by: Ego Boyo, Charles Igwe
- Starring: Ego Boyo, RMD
- Cinematography: Leslie Yaor
- Music by: Kalu Njoku, Ndidi Anyianuka
- Production company: Crystal Gold
- Distributed by: Crystal Gold Productions
- Release date: June 1996 (Muson Center)
- Country: Nigeria
- Language: English

Violated is a 1996 Nigerian romantic drama film directed by Amaka Igwe and starring Richard Mofe Damijo and Ego Boyo. The film and its sequel, Violated 2 (or part 2), were released in the home video format in June 1996.

== Premise ==
The film tells the story of a young man, Tega (Richard Mofe Damijo), from a wealthy background who falls in love and marries Peggy (Ego Boyo), who came from a different background. However, their marriage is put to the test when hidden secrets unfold; Tega's ex-wife reappears in his life, and he also learns about his ex-boss' relationship with his wife when she was young.

== Cast ==
- Richard Mofe Damijo as Tega
- Ego Boyo as Peggy
- Kunle Bamtefa as Lois
- Joke Silva as Myra
- Mildred Iweka as Toms
- Taiwo Obileye as "Pinky" Farrell
- Wale Macaulay as J.C.
- Funlola Aofiyebi-Raimi

== Reception ==
Violated was one of the highest-selling home video productions in 1996. At the time of the film's production, Nigeria videos were distributed with the production of a large number of tapes at once, which are then distributed to various marketers. While average sales for films during the period were about 30,000-50,000, Violated sold about 150,000 copies. Information Nigeria listed the film among the best 20 films of Nollywood that will never be forgotten.
