= The Mayors =

- Directed by: Dickson Iroegbu
- Written by: Dickson Iroegbu
- Screenplay by: Tai Emeka Obasi; Dickson Iroegbu
- Story by: Dickson Iroegbu
- Produced by: Dickson Iroegbu
- Starring: Richard Mofe-Damijo; Sam Dede; Segun Arinze; Mike Ezuruonye
- Edited by: Bode Alao-Festus
- Music by: Mike Nliam; Chris Okoro
- Release date: 2004 (Nigeria)
- Country: Nigeria

The Mayors is a 2004 Nigerian drama film written, produced and directed by Dickson Iroegbu, and starring Richard Mofe-Damijo, Sam Dede, Segun Arinze and Mike Ezuruonye. The film won 5 awards at the maiden edition of the Africa Movie Academy Awards in 2005, including the awards for Best Picture, Best Screenplay, Best Director, Best Actor in a Lead Role and Best Support Actor.

== Cast ==
- Richard Mofe-Damijo
- Sam Dede
- Segun Arinze
- Mike Ezuruonye

== See also ==
- List of Nigerian films of 2004
