= Roti (2017 film) =

- Directed by: Kunle Afolayan
- Written by: [Shola Dada]
- Starring: Kate Henshaw Kunle Afolayan Fathia Balogun
- Release date: 2017
- Country: Nigeria

Roti is a 2017 Nigerian film which was directed and written by Kunle Afolayan.

== Plot ==
Diane and Kabir who are a married couple lose their 10-year-old son Roti to heart disease. Diane who was in a lot of grief, later saw a boy who she believed was her son. She became happy again but was told that Juwon is not Roti's reincarnation, so she has to let go.

== Cast ==
- Kate Henshaw
- Kunle Afolayan
- Toyin Oshinaike
- Fathia Balogun
- Darimisire Afolayan
