= Mortal Inheritance =

1996 film

- Directed by: Andy Amenechi
- Written by: Bond Emeruwa, Andy Amenechi
- Produced by: Zeb Ejiro
- Starring: Fred Amata, Omotola Jalade Ekeinde, Kunle Bamtefa
- Music by: Abay Esho
- Release date: 1996
- Running time: 104 minutes
- Country: Nigeria
- Language: English

Mortal Inheritance is a Nigerian film produced by Zeb Ejiro, directed by Andy Amenechi and written by Bond Emeruwa.

== Plot ==
Mortal Inheritance is a romantic drama about a woman dealing with sickle-cell anaemia. The plot also delves into cultural resistance to inter-ethnic marriages in Nigeria. The protagonist of the story is Kemi, a Yoruba lady with sickle cell anemia, the part was played by Omotola Jalade-Ekeinde. She beats the odds of dying young as a sickle cell patient and, upon reaching adulthood, falls in love with Chike, an Igbo man. When she realizes that Chike has the AS genotype, or sickle cell trait, she ends the relationship.

== Cast ==
- Omotola Jalade Ekeinde as Kemi Johnson
- Fred Amata as Chike Morah
- Kunle Bamtefa as Chief Morah
- Abiola Atanda as Mrs Johnson
- Bob Ekarika as Kayode Adedeji
- Emma France as Nze Nzekwu
- Akenn G as Nurse 1
- Emeka Ike as Alex Nwosu
- Obiageli Molube as Mrs. Morah
- Ifeoma Nevoh as Uchenna Morah
- Sam Obiakeme as Dr. Sam
- Mike Ogbonnaya as Doctor
- Victoria Ohamobi as Nurse 3
- Caroline Okpei as Receptionist
- Mbadiwe Orji as Chief Obi
- K.C. Ukwuagu as Nurse 2

== See also ==
List of Nigerian films
