= Taxi Driver: Oko Ashewo =

2015 Nigerian black comedy thriller film

- Theatrical release poster
- Directed by: Daniel Oriahi
- Written by: Abara Amanze; Yemi Nexus Adeyemi; Victor Negro
- Produced by: Don Omope; Ayobami Macaulay; Daniel Oriahi
- Starring: Odunlade Adekola; Femi Jacobs; Ijeoma Grace Agu; Hafeez Oyetoro, Richard Akinladen, Babajide Alimison, Kelechi Udegbe, Toyin Oshinaike
- Cinematography: Akpe Ododoru
- Edited by: Yemi Jolaoso
- Music by: Sossick; Terry Apala (vocal)
- Production companies: FilmOne Production; House 5 Production; Orbit Imagery
- Distributed by: FilmOne Distributions
- Release date: 13 November 2015
- Running time: 110 minutes
- Country: Nigeria
- Languages: Yoruba; English (pidgin)
- Box office: ₦22,630,000

Taxi Driver: Oko Ashewo, also known as just Taxi Driver or Oko Ashewo, is a 2015 Nigerian black comedy thriller film produced by Ayobami Macaulay and directed by Daniel Oriahi. It stars Odunlade Adekola, Femi Jacobs, Ijeoma Grace Agu and Hafeez Oyetoro.

== Plot ==
Taxi Driver is a film centred on working in Lagos at night, as a taxi driver. It narrates the story of Adigun (Femi Jacobs), a 31-year-old naive village mechanic who comes to Lagos for the first time after the sudden death of his estranged father, who was a taxi driver. Taiwo (Odunlade Adekola), his father’s fellow taxi driver, helps Adigun to navigate Lagos and get accustomed to the streets. Adigun has to cope with dealing with the odd people he comes across working at night; from Delia (Grace Ijeoma Agu), a prostitute, to Kakanfo (Hafeez Oyetoro), the unseen vigilante, and to the notorious assassins called "three wise men".

== Cast ==
- Femi Jacobs as Adigun
- Odunlade Adekola as Taiwo
- Ijeoma Grace Agu as Delia
- Richard Akinladen as Kuku
- Babajide Alimison as Tiny
- Afeez Oyetoro as Kakanfo
- Toyin Oshinaike as Baba mistura
- Kelechi Udegbe as Bashar

== Production ==
The director, Oriahi, stated: "Taxi Driver: Oko Ashewo is a personal journal of my admiration for Lagos Island and its popular streets, from Igbosere road to Broad street, CMS, Obalende and vibrancy of its people. I relied on own my experiences as a foreigner to Lagos to influence my approach in telling this story of a man’s journey in search of purpose".

== Release ==
The first teaser trailer for Oko Ashewo was released on YouTube on 16 October 2015, while the official trailer was released a week after, on 23 October. It was generally released on 13 November 2015.

Oko Ashewo became an instant box office hit, breaking records to become the highest opening weekend gross for the year at the time of its release. It battled the film Spectre for the top spot in its first week of release. It grossed over ₦20 million at the cinemas, making it the third highest grossing Nigerian film of 2015, behind Road to Yesterday and Fifty.

== Reception ==
Oris Aigbokhaevbolo on BellaNaija, although faults the narrative as a misrepresentation of Lagos, he commended the film for the authenticity of the dialogue, the cinematography, and the appropriate representation of the Nigerian working class without patronizing. He concluded: "Taxi Driver is gripping and moves briskly as a film set in a Lagos vehicle should. But an expositional scene intended to give the lead female character a back story deadens the momentum. It recovers and heads towards mayhem and several twists in a key scene. At that point you may think Taxi Driver is headed for tragedy. It doesn’t and that is the film’s tragedy. [...] His [Oriahi's] need to crowd-please wins over the film’s edginess in his story". Kemi Filani commended the film's sound design, cinematography and the general production quality. She also praised the characterization, and the actors' performances, but condemned the concluding part of the film, describing it as "confusing".

Modern Ghana praised the actors' performances, soundtrack, cinematography and set design, concluding:"What sets TAXI DRIVER: Oko Ashawo from other movies, is it[s] realism and down-earthedness [sic] that it showcases to its viewers, entertaining them while educating them as well. The comic relief is very well timed and you will definitely be glad to have spent your time and money watching it". Tola Williams of True Nollywood Stories commended the cinematography and Agu's performance as the prostitute, but criticized the plot of the film, stating: "Taxi Driver, AKA Oko Ashawo, AKA Film With Little Story & Plenty Gunshots".
