= Moremi Ajasoro =

Yoruba queen

- Moremi Ajasoro
- Born: Ile-Ife, Yoruba Empire
- Died: Ile-Ife
- Occupations: Queen, heroine
- Known for: Her role in the liberation of Ile-Ife from the Ugbo people
- Spouse: Oranmiyan
- Children: Oluorogbo

Moremi Ajasoro(Yoruba: Mọremí Àjàṣorò) was a legendary Yoruba queen and folk heroine in the Yorubaland region of present-day southwestern Nigeria who played a significant role in the liberation of the Yoruba kingdom of Ife from the neighbouring Ugbo Kingdom.

Moremi was married to Oranmiyan, the son of Oduduwa, the first king of Ile-Ife.

== History of Queen Moremi Ajasoro and Ile-Ife ==
The Ayaba (Queen Consort) Moremi lived in the 12th century, hailed from the area of Offa, a town in present-day Kwara State and was married to Ọranyan, heir to the king of Ife and son of the founding father of the Yoruba people, Oduduwa. Ile-Ife was a kingdom that was said to have been at war with an adjoining group who were known to them as the Forest people, Ugbò in the Yoruba language.

Scores of Ife citizens were being enslaved by these people, and because of this they were generally regarded with disdain by the denizens of early Ife. Although the people of Ile-Ife were furious about their raids, they did not have the means to defend themselves. This is because the invaders were seen as spirits (Ará Ọ̀rùn) by the people of Ife, appearing as masquerades completely covered in raffia palm fronds.

Queen Moremi was a courageous, brave and beautiful woman who, in order to deal with the problem facing her people, pledged a great sacrifice to the spirit of the Esimirin river so that she could discover the strength of her nation's enemies. Following the incessant raids and with Ife under siege, she took the heroic step of offering herself to be captured by the raiders. She was then taken as a slave by the Ugbo, due to her beauty and Esimirin's help, she married their ruler as his anointed queen. After familiarizing herself with the secrets of her new husband's army, she escaped to Ile-Ife and revealed this to the Yorubas, who were then able to subsequently defeat them in battle using the intelligence she provided.

Following the war she returned to her first husband, King Oramiyan of Ife (and later Oyo), who immediately had her re-instated as his queen. Moremi returned to the Esimirin river to fulfill her pledge. The river demanded she sacrifice her only son, Oluorogbo. The demand was inconceivable and Moremi pleaded with the god for a less terrible offering to be accepted. In the end, however, she kept her promise and paid the price. The offering of Oluorogbo to the river god grieved not only Moremi but the whole kingdom of Ifẹ. The people of Ifẹ consoled Queen Moremi by offering to be her eternal children as a replacement for the child she lost - a promise kept by them until today.

== Legacy ==
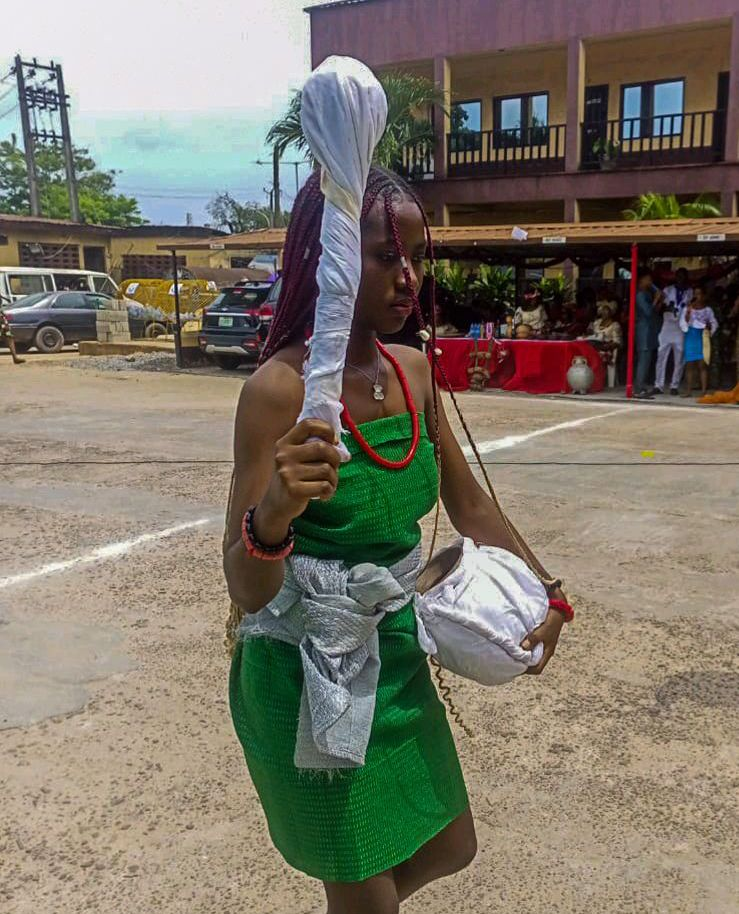
Actress dressed as Moremi for a cultural play

The Edi Festival was started shortly after Moremi's death to celebrate the sacrifice she made for the Yoruba people. More recently, Queen Moremi: The Musical - a theatrical story of love, faith, honour and the ultimate sacrifice - has also been produced.

Various public places are named after her in the contemporary Yorubaland region of Nigeria, such as Moremi High School and the female residence halls at the University of Lagos and Obafemi Awolowo University.

In 2017, Oba Ogunwusi, the Ooni of Ile-Ife, Osun State, erected a statue of Moremi in his palace. The statue is the tallest in Nigeria, displacing the previous holder of that record (a statue in Owerri, the Imo State capital). It is also the fourth tallest in Africa . The Custodian and Chief Priest of the Moremi Ajasoro shrine is Oba Isoro Sunday Oluwagbeileke Obisanya Owa Yekere of Ife.

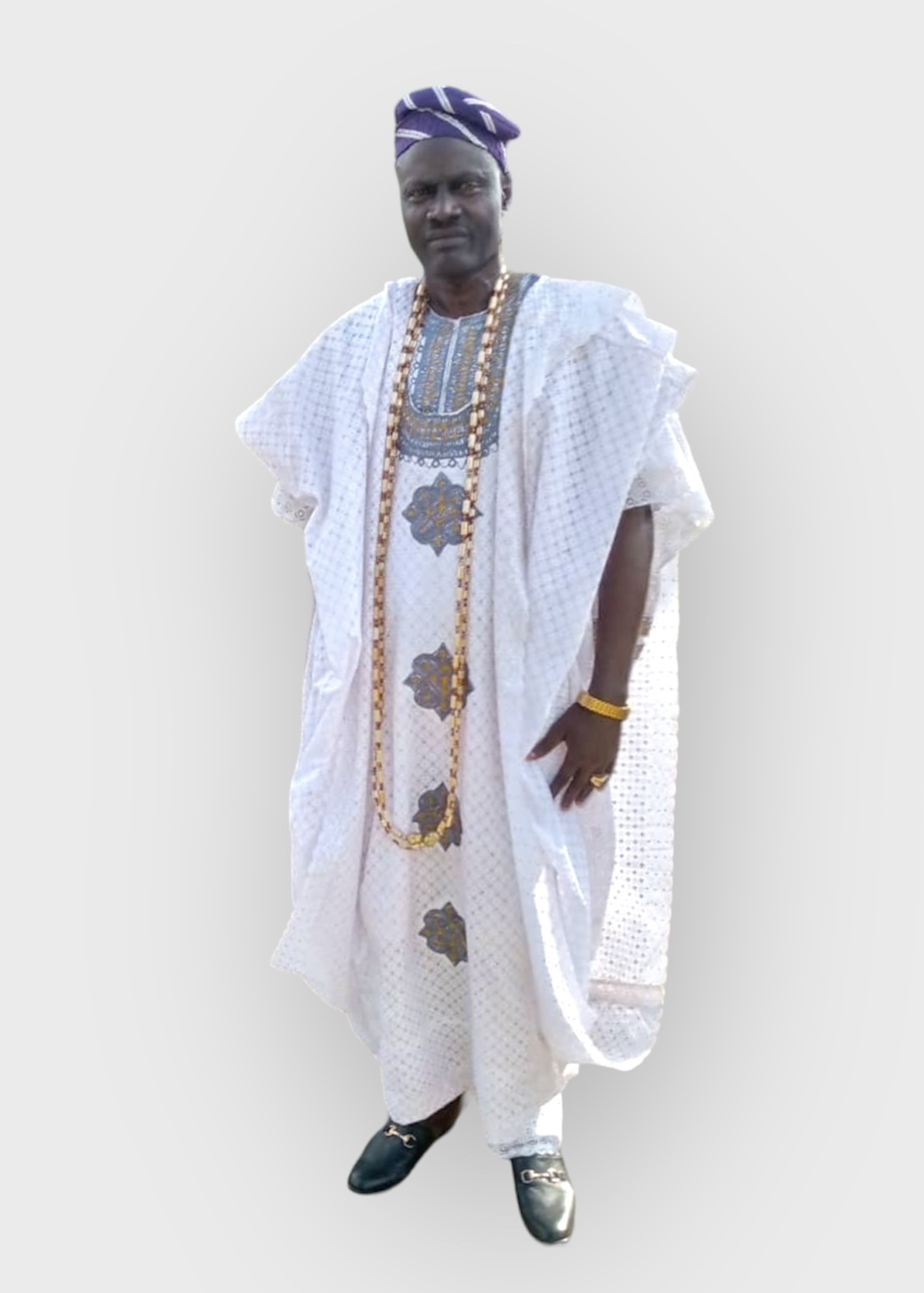
Oba Isoro Sunday Oluwagbeileke Obisanya Owa Yekere, Moremi Ajasoro Custodian and Chief Priest

== In literature and media ==
Moremi's story has inspired many literary adaptations and dramas. A unique adaptation is a comic book titled "Moremi: An African Legend" under the 'An African Legend' comic series. It was published in 2021 using the popular bande dessinee style to appeal to younger audiences.

An episode of Kizazi Moto: Generation Fire titled "Moremi" is loosely based on the story with it acting as a loose uplifting conclusion to the original tale. Moremi is depicted as a scientist who was forced to use her son Olu, most likely a shortened version of Oluorogbo, to act as a power source to fend off dangerous creatures that inhabited the land. This resulted in the creation of Luo, a mute spirit-like being, existing. Moremi rescues Luo and tries to reunite him with his original body. In doing so, the creatures are defeated and Moremi is finally reunited with her son.

Bisi Adeleye-Fayemi, a feminist activist, wrote a story about Moremi Ajasoro.

== See also ==
- History of Early Ife
- History of The Ugbo
