= Missing Angel =

- Movie poster for Missing Angel
- Directed by: Charles Novia
- Produced by: Charles Novia
- Starring: Stella Damasus Aboderin; Desmond Elliot; Empress Njamah; Nobert Young; Tuvi James
- Release date: 2004
- Running time: 90 minutes
- Country: Nigeria
- Languages: English, Pidgin

Missing Angel is a 2004 Nigerian film directed by Charles Novia and starring Stella Damasus Aboderin and Desmond Elliot. Produced by Ulzee Nigerian Ltd, it was followed by two sequels. The plot deals with Dolly (Aboderin), a troubled young woman who makes a vow to God that she should die on her twenty-fifth birthday, if her misery continued. A dark angel (Elliot) is sent to manipulate her, but slowly falls in love with her.

== Synopsis ==
Dolly was an orphan who lived in extreme poverty. Her only source of hope, her younger brother, died because she could not afford food or adequate hospital treatment for him. Overwhelmed by her suffering, she vowed that, if God did not answer her prayers by her 25th birthday, He should take her life. The angels of darkness took her at her word.

Dolly subsequently won the lottery, transforming her fortunes. She became wealthy and built a successful business, but her 25th birthday was fast approaching. Concerned that Dolly should marry, her best friend arranged a blind date with her boyfriend's friend, who was returning from the UK.

Meanwhile, the king of Hades intervened, sending his dark angel to claim the price of Dolly's vow. What follows is an extraordinary chain of events.

== Cast ==
- Stella Damasus Aboderin - Dolly
- Desmond Elliot - Angel
- Empress Njamah - Julie
- Norbert Young - Pastor James
- Tuvi James - Thompson
- Don Richards - Lord Hades
- Chris Ibonye - Manager
- Wale Olaseson - Bobo
- Favour Chuks - Demon 1
- Tony Johnson - Demon 2
- Nkechi Chilaka - Attendant 1
- Angela - Mama Femi
- Yvonne Jegede - Rosa
- Steven Essiet - Church Extra

== See also ==
- List of Nigerian films of 2004
