= Ibrahim Jammal =

Nigerian actor

- Education: Babcock University
- Occupations: Actor; producer
- Years active: 2016-till date

Ibrahim Jammal is a Nigerian actor and producer. He is notable for his lead role in Showmax's Original Drama series ‘Crime and Justice Lagos’ 2022. He is also known for his roles in The Delivery Boy, the Milkmaid and Green White Green.

== Early life ==
After his secondary education, he received his first degree in Computer Information Systems from Babcock University, Nigeria.

== Career ==
Jammal began his film career as a production manager. He later blended acting and has featured in several films such as The Delivery Boy, The Milkmaid and Glamour Girl.

His first appearance as an actor in a film was his role as "Baba" in Green White Green (2016). Afterwards, he starred in The Delivery Boy in 2018 as "Amir', the lead actor. In 2022, Jammal played "Daladi Dikko" in the Nigerian series Crime and Justice Lagos.

== Filmography ==
Year	Title	Role	Ref
2016	Green White Green	Baba	
2018	The Delivery Boy	Amir	
2019	The Lost Okoroshi	Musa	
2019	The Last Tree	Ade	
2020	The Milkmaid	Haruna	
2020	D.I.D	Makinde	
2020	A Second Husband	Suki	
2021	Other Side of History	Yakubu Gowon	
2022	There is Something Wrong with the Bamideles	Inspector	
2022	Glamour Girl	Kenneth	
2022	Crime and Justice Lagos	Danladi Dikko	
2023	The Bride Price		
2023	Contact	Tokunbo	
2024	The Beads	Ranti's Conscience	

== Awards and nominations ==
Year	Award	Category	Result
2016	Africa Magic Viewers Choice Award	Best Young/Promising Actor	Nominated
