= The Ghost and the House of Truth =

- Directed by: Akin Omotoso
- Produced by: Ego Boyo
- Starring: Kate Henshaw, Susan Wokoma, Toyin Oshinaike, Mario Obruthe, Imoleayo Olusanya and Dara Egerton-Shyngle
- Production companies: Temple Productions Slate 1 Films and The Mission Entertainment
- Release date: 2019
- Country: Nigeria
- Language: English

The Ghost and the House of Truth is a Nigerian film produced by Ego Boyo and directed by Akin Omotoso. It was released in 2019 and produced under Temple Productions, Slate 1 Films, and The Mission Entertainment. It is the sixth film produced by Temple Productions and the second collaboration between Omotoso and Boyo.

The film stars Toyin Oshinaike, Kate Henshaw, Susan Wokoma, Mario Obruthe, Imoleayo Olusanya and Dara Egerton-Shyngle. It explores the criminal and less-discussed effects of missing children and the dangers to which they are exposed.

== Synopsis ==
The Ghost and the House of Truth follows Bola Ogun, a counsellor and a single mother of a daughter named Nike. Her occupation involves advising people to let go of past occurrences or events that might have caused damage or affected the patient negatively and live for the present and future. She is put to the test as a victim herself when her daughter Nike goes missing and is believed to have been murdered. This leads to a series of unpleasant events and days of suffering for Bola, who works with the local police to find her daughter.

== Cast ==
- Kate Henshaw as Inspector Folasade
- Susan Wokoma as Bola Ogun
- Kemi Lala Akindoju as Dupe
- Ijeoma Grace Agu as Mrs. Ayodeji
- Gloria Young as Mrs. Douglas
- Tope Tedela as Barrister Tokunbo
- Ṣeun Ajayi as Debo
- Fabian Lojede as Mr. Ayodeji
- Toyin Oshinaike as Joe
- Imoleayo Olusanya as Nike Ogun
- Mario Obruthe
- Oludara Egerton-Shyngle as Susan
- Omoye Uzamere as woman officer

== Premiere ==
The Ghost and the House of Truth premiered internationally on 20 September 2019 at the Urban World Film Festival, EMC Empire Theater 12, New York City, United States. The film had its African premiere on 15 November 2019 at the Africa International Film Festival (AFRIFF), where it served as the official closing film. It also opened Film Africa in London. The film was screened nationwide on 22 November 2019, and is available for streaming on Showmax and BET+.

== Awards and nominations ==
| Year | Award | Category | Recipient | Result | Ref |
|---|---|---|---|---|---|
| 2019 | Africa International Film Festival Globe awards | Best Director | Akin Omotoso | Won | |
| 2019 | Africa International Film Festival Globe awards | Best Actress | Kate Henshaw | Won | |
| 2019 | Africa International Film Festival Globe awards | Best Nigerian Film | | Won | |
| 2020 | Urbanworld Film Festival | Best World Film | | Won | |
| 2020 | Africa Movie Academy Awards | Achievement in Editing Award | | Won | |
