= Yinka Edward =

Nigerian cinematographer

- Born: Nigeria
- Education: National Film and Television School, UK
- Occupation: Cinematographer
- Years active: 2006 - present

Yinka Edward, born in Jos, Nigeria, is a Nigerian cinematographer best known for his works on the films October 1, 93 Days, A Love Story (winner of BAFTA's Best British Short Animation category, 2017), Confusion Na Wa and Lionheart.

== Career ==
In the early years of his career after graduating from the National Film Institute in Jos, Nigeria in 2006, Edward worked with Nigerian film director, Mak 'Kusare on the movie Ninety Degrees and was part of BBC's production team on the Wetin Dey series. After his work on Wetin Dey, Edward shot The Ties That Bind in Namibia, which was the country's first indigenously produced series. Back in Nigeria, Edward worked on Kunle Afolayan's films The Figurine, Phone Swap and October 1. He also shot Izu Ojukwu's films Alero's Symphony, and '76. In Kenya, he shot the feature film Something Necessary, which was produced by Tom Tykwer and directed by Judy Kibinge. Something Necessary went on to screen at the Toronto International Film Festival, 2013 and was nominated for Audience Choice Award at the Chicago International Film Festival, 2013. One of his most recent works is the Netflix original movie Lionheart a Nigerian feature film, directed by Genevieve Nnaji. Edward is an alumnus of the National Film and Television School Beaconsfield, England, where he received a Master of Arts degree in film and television production, concentrating in cinematography.
