= Audrey Ajose =

Nigerian lawyer and writer

Omoba Audrey Olatokunbo Ajose
- Born: 1937
- Occupations: Lawyer; writer
- Parents: Omoba Oladele Ajose; Beatrice Spencer Roberts

Audrey Olatokunbo Ajose (born c. 1937) is a Nigerian lawyer and writer. She served as her country's ambassador to Scandinavia from 1987 to 1991.

== Early life and education ==
The daughter of Omoba Oladele Ajose and Beatrice Spencer Roberts, Audrey Ajose was the daughter of a foreign woman married to a Nigerian. She studied journalism at the Regent Polytechnic. She studied and practiced law but still continued to work in broadcasting. She also studied theology and taught theology in the Lutheran church.

== Career ==
Ajose worked as a journalist at the Daily Times of Nigeria. Barrister Ajose made the case for more flexible immigration laws for foreign women married to Nigerians to some of the country's top parliamentarians. She drafted the first Nigerwives-Nigeria constitution under the Corporate Affairs Commission of Nigeria on 7 September 1987 with an RC No. 5527.

Ajose was a founding member of Soroptimist International of Eko and served as its president. She was a member of the Isale Eko Descendants’ Union Scholarship Fund Committee (89).

== Selected works ==
- Yomi's Adventures, juvenile fiction (1964)
- Yomi in Paris, juvenile fiction (1966)
