= Femi Jacobs =

Nigerian actor

- Born: Oluwafemisola Jacobs; 8 May
- Citizenship: Nigerian
- Education: mass communication, Lagos State University
- Alma mater: Lagos State University
- Notable work: The Meeting
- Television: Tinsel

Femi Jacobs// (born Oluwafemisola Jacobs//; 8 May) is a Nigerian actor, speaker, and singer. He came into prominence for playing Makinde Esho in the film The Meeting, which also stars Rita Dominic and Jide Kosoko. For his role in The Meeting, he received a nomination for Best Actor in a Leading Role at the 9th Africa Movie Academy Awards. He also won the award for Best Actor in a Comedy at the 2015 Africa Magic Viewers' Choice Awards (AMVCA).

== Biography ==
Femi attended Fakunle Comprehensive high school, Osogbo in Osun State of Nigeria. Jacobs studied mass communication at Lagos State University.

== Accolades ==
For his role in The Meeting, he received a nomination for Best Actor in a Leading Role at the 9th Africa Movie Academy Awards. He also received nominations for Best Lead Actor in a Film at the 2013 Nigeria Entertainment Awards, for Favourite Male African International Emerging Screen Talent at the 2014 Screen Nation Awards, and for Best Supporting Actor of the Year at the 2015 City People Entertainment Awards. He won the award for Best Actor in a Comedy at the 2015 Africa Magic Viewers' Choice Awards (AMVCA) and Best Supporting Actor (English) at the 2014 Best of Nollywood Awards (BON).

== Filmography ==
=== Films ===
Year	Title	Role	Notes
2006	Choices		
2012	The Meeting	Makinde Esho	
2012	Journey to Self	Uzo	
2013	Dreamwalker	Richard	
2014	Render to Caesar		
2014	Tunnel	Pastor Lade	
2015	Heaven's Hell		
2015	The Black Silhouette	Doctor Obi	
2015	The Visit	Chidi Nebo	
2015	Iquo's Journal	Banjo Ogunleye	
2015	Taxi Driver: Oko Ashewo	Adigun	
2015	Just Married	Kola	
2015	Heart of a Sister		
2017	The Guest		
2017	Public Property		
2018	All Shades of Wrong	Barth	
2020	Looking For Baami	Femi Osinowo	
2020	Introducing the Kujus	Mautin	
2020	The New Normal (2020 film)	Banji	
2021	Eagle Wings	Paul Dike	
2021	Under the Carpet		
2021	Soole		
2022	Battle on Buka Street	Lashile	
2023	The House of Secrets	Dr. Jide	
2023	The Kujus Again	Mautin	
2023	Egun	Atai	
2024	It Blooms in June	Lanre Akande	
2024	Saving Onome	Mr. Azuka	
2024	Freedom Way		

=== Television ===
Year	Title	Role
	Tinsel	Eddie Edoma
2008	Tango	
2014	Middlemen	
2015	This Thing Called Marriage	
2015	Binary Unit	
2019–	Unmarried	
2024	Princess on a Hill	Denloye

== Awards and nominations ==
Year	Award ceremony	Category	Film	Result	Ref
2020	Best of Nollywood Awards	Best Actor in a Lead role – English	Colours of Deceit	Nominated	
2021	Best of Nollywood Awards	Best Supporting Actor –English	Eagle Wings	Nominated	
2022	Africa Magic Viewers' Choice Awards	Best Actor in A Drama	Introducing the Kujus	Nominated	

== See also ==
- List of Nigerian actors
