= Sam Dede =

Nigerian filmmaker and lecturer (born 1965)

- Born: Samuel Dedetoku; 17 November 1965 (age 60); Lagos
- Education: Government Comprehensive Secondary School
- Alma mater: University of Port Harcourt
- Occupations: Film director, actor, lecturer, politician, television personality
- Years active: 1995–present
- Spouse: Tammy Sam-Dede (m. 2001)
- Awards: Africa Movie Academy Award for Best Actor in a Supporting Role

Samuel Dedetoku, popularly known by his stage name Sam Dede (born 17 November 1965), is a Nigerian veteran actor, director, politician, and lecturer. Sam Dede, as he is widely known in movies, studied theater arts at the University of Port Harcourt.

== Biography ==
Sam Dede was born on 17 November 1965 in Lagos and moved to Sapele.

== Career ==
He entered the Nollywood industry in 1995 and rose to prominence for his role in the film Ijele in 1999. In 2005, Dede won the Africa Movie Academy Award for Best Actor in a Supporting Role for his performance in the 2004 film The Mayors. He was honoured with SVAFF 2014 Special Recognition Award for his lifetime achievement and contributions to Nigerian cinema. He was nominated for the Africa Movie Academy Award for Best Actor in a Leading Role in 2018 for his performance in the 2017 film In My Country.

He was appointed as the Director-General of the Rivers State Tourism Development Agency in 2012 and served in the position for a short period of time. He is also a lecturer in the University of Port Harcourt teaching acting to upcoming actors. One of his students, Yul Edochie, went on to become a lead actor in Nollywood. He however, said in 2012 that he would not drop acting for politics.

== Selected filmography ==
- The Mayors (2004)
- Last Vote (2001)
- The Last Burial (2000)
- Issakaba (2000) as Ebube
- Igodo (1999)
- Blood Money 2 (1998) as Cult Leader
- Blood Money (1997) as Cult Leader
- Mission to Nowhere (2008) as Roger
- Darkest Night (2005)
- Blood and Oil (2010) as Governor
- Bumper to Bumper (2004)
- Never Die for Love (2004) as Mark
- 5 Apostles (2009)
- Undercover
- Ijele (1999) as Ijele
- Ashes to Ashes
- The Lost Number (2012) as Diwani Wonodi
- In My Country (2017) as Afam
- Kamsi (2018) as Nicholas Katanga
- Our Jesus Story (2020)
- The Good Husband (2020) as Martins
- The Legend of Inikpi (2020) as King Attah Ayegba
- Gone (2021) as Ani
- Brotherhood (2022) as Official Daniel
- Foreigner's God (2022) as Dim Odigbo
- The Black Book (2023) as Angel
- Breath of Life (2023) as Chief Okonkwo
- Merry Men 3: Nemesis (2023) as Uduak Francis
- Here Love Lies (2023) as Father Abraham
- The Man Died (2024 film)
- Hijack '93 (2024) as Mallam Jerry

== See also ==
- List of Nigerian actors
- List of Nigerian film producers
- List of Nigerian film directors
