= Francis Agu =

Nigerian actor (1965–2007)

- Francis Agu in the 1990s
- Born: Francis Agu; 18 February 1965; Lagos, Lagos, Nigeria
- Died: 20 March 2007 (aged 42)
- Education: University of Lagos
- Years active: 1980s–2007
- Known for: Checkmate, Living in bondage, Blood Money

Francis Agu (18 February 1965 – 20 March 2007) was a Nigerian TV and cinema ("Nollywood") actor. He was best known for his role on the long-running Nigerian television series Checkmate.

== Early life ==
Francis Okechukwu Agu was born in Lagos State, southwest Nigeria on 18 February 1965 to the Catholic family of Fidelis and Virginia Agu from Enugu-Ngwo, Enugu State, and was the seventh of eight children. His name, Okechukwu, means "God's portion". A quiet and intelligent youth, he was at one time a member of the Altar Boys and a lector at St. Dominic's Catholic Church, Yaba, Lagos. He started his formal education at Ladi-Lak Institute Alagomeji, Ebute-Metta, Lagos. His high school education was obtained at St. Finbarr's College, Lagos, where he was groomed by the missionary founder of the school, Rev. Fr. Dennis Joseph Slattery. He also attended the University of Lagos, where he studied mass communication.

== Career ==
Agu's theatrical career began at the Yodrac Playhouse at St. Dominic's Church, at a time when he was already working for Nigeria Arab Bank in Lagos. Yodrac, founded by George Eboka, has produced entertainment industry professionals such as Toyin Oshinaike, Kevin Ushi, Kris Ubani-Roberts, Williams Ekpo, Gregory Odutayo, Jude Orhorha, Tunji Otun, and Neye Adebulugbe. Agu's talent was immediately spotted by the then director of Yodrac, Isaac John.

His first appearance was in the play This is Our Chance by James Ene Henshaw, directed by Isaac John. He played the lead role, King Damba. Others include The Gods Are Not to Blame by Ola Rotimi, and Trials of Brother Jero by Wole Soyinka.

Segun Ojewuyi directed him in an ironical play The Man Who Never Died at the National Theater, Lagos. This was followed by several productions with different theater gurus such as Chuck Mike. He also had a stint in singing with the Steve Rhodes Voices, directed by Elder Steve Rhodes himself.

Agu featured in Checkmate, a 1990s TV soap opera, in which he played the character Benny. He also starred as Ichie Million in the first Nigerian Home Video, Living in Bondage, which brought him to national fame. He produced his first film, Jezebel, in 1994 and went on to produce and direct many others, including In the Name of the Father, A Divine Call, The Boy is Mine, Body and Soul, Love and Pride, A Dance in the Forest, and Take Me to Jesus.

Agu became ill in October 2006 and died on 20 March 2007.

== Filmography ==
Year	Title	Role
1992	Living in Bondage	Ichie Million
1993	Circle of Doom	
2006	Take Me to Jesus	
1997	Blood Money	S.P.
2001	Time to Kill	
