= Rita Edochie =

Nigerian actress

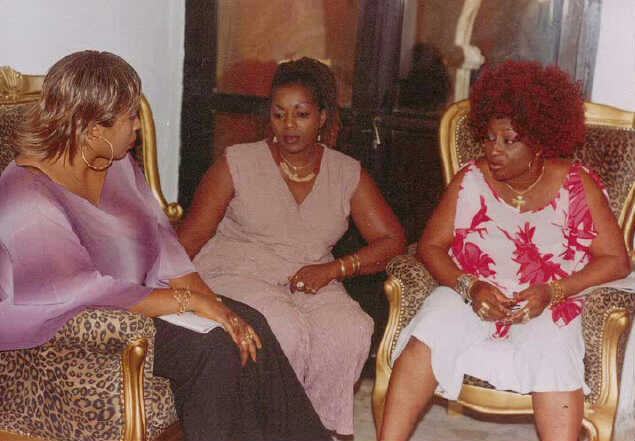
- Edochie (centre) on a film set in 2008 with Chioma Toplis and Patience Ozokwor
- Born: 16 April 1964 (age 62)
- Citizenship: Nigeria
- Occupation: Actress
- Spouse: Tony Edochie
- Children: 4

Rita Edochie // (born 16 April 1964) is a Nigerian film actress.

== Early life and education ==
Rita Edochie is from Anambra State, in the southeast region of Nigeria, and is Igbo.

In 2016, she revealed that she was sexually assaulted in primary school and gave birth to a child.

She earned a bachelor's degree in Mass Communication from Nnamdi Azikiwe University in Awka in 1990.

== Career ==
Edochie first worked as a radio presenter for Anambra State Broadcasting Service, where she remained until she retired in 2008. She began her acting career with minor roles in 1990 and has had a long career in Nollywood films, including Love Delayed, Onye-Eze, No More War, Chain Reaction, 1999, Abuja Boys and Censored Love. She has become known for playing motherly roles.

In 2016, she received the Ambassador for Peace Award from the Universal Peace Federation.

== Filmography ==
- Women's Cot (2005)
- Mami Wata (2023)

== Personal life ==
In December 1990, she married Tony Edochie, the younger brother of Pete Edochie; they have four children. She is the aunt of Yul Edochie.
