= Akin Omotoso =

Nigerian and South African film director, writer, and actor (born 1974)

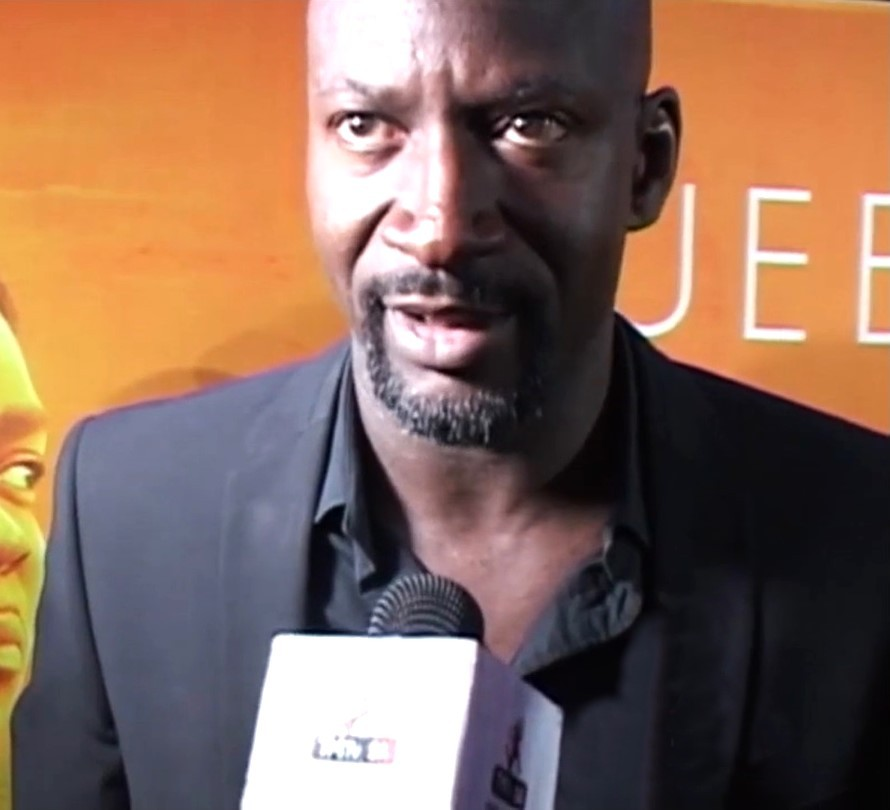
- Omotoso in 2016
- Born: 1974 (age 51–52); Maiduguri, Nigeria
- Education: Studied speech and drama in the University of Western Cape
- Occupation: Filmmaker
- Known for: Blood Diamond; Man on Ground; Tell Me Sweet Something; Catching Feelings; Rise
- Father: Kole Omotoso
- Relatives: Yewande Omotoso (sister)

Akin Omotoso (born 1974) is a Nigerian and South African film director, writer, and actor. He is best known for directing the 2022 film Rise. Both his father Kole Omotoso and his sister Yewande Omotoso are also writers.

== Early life and education ==
Omotoso was born in Nigeria, where he grew up in Ile Ife, Osun State. His family emigrated to South Africa in 1992 after his father, Kole Omotoso, took an academic appointment with the University of the Western Cape. Akin Omotoso studied at the University of Cape Town, obtaining a diploma in speech and drama. His mother died in 2003.

== Career ==
Omotoso ventured into entertainment while at the university. His acting debut was in Sunjata by Mark Fleishman. This also earned Omotoso a Fleur du Cap Award for Most Promising Student in 1995. He used the money from acting in the play to direct his first short films, The Kiss of Milk, The Nightwalkers, and The Caretaker. By 1999, he wrote his first full-length film, entitled God is African. The film was released in 2003. He started a production company along with Robbie Thorpe and Kgomotso Matsunyane called T.O.M. pictures in 2003.

Omotoso directed the television series Jacob's Cross on Africa Magic, M-Net and SABC between 2007 and 2013. In 2010, he began working on Tell Me Sweet Something; speaking about the script with Pulse Nigeria, he stated that Theodore Witchers' Love Jones (1997) was the influence behind the film. Omotoso also noted that he received a grant from the African Women's Development Fund. The film earned him the best director award at the 2016 Africa Magic Viewers Choice Awards in Lagos State.

In an interview with Azania Mosaka, he described the South African film industry atmosphere as having an enabling environment for aspiring filmmakers. He particularly acknowledged funds from the Department of Trade and Industry and the National Film and Video Foundation (NFVF) that prepares film stakeholders for the industry.

In 2022, Omotoso directed Giannis Antetokounmpo biopic Rise for Disney, which received generally positive reviews. Sourav Chakraborty of Sportskeeda found Rise to be an inspiring sports movie, stated Omotoso successfully provides an atmosphere of tension across his direction, and praised the performances of the cast members.

== Filmography ==
Year	Title	Role	Notes
1994	Soul City		
1999	A Reasonable Man	Photographer	
2000	Operation Delta Force 5: Random Fire	Vice Consul Williams	
2003	God is African	Former DJ	Uncredited, director
2003	Generations	Soap Opera	
2004	Gums & Noses	Furious Ad Man	
2004	Lettre d'amour zoulou	Songs of Solomon	Voice
2005	Lord of War	General Solomon	
2006	Blood Diamond	Peacekeeper	
2006	Gathering the Scattered Cousins		Short, director
2006	A Place Called Home		TV series, director
2007	Shake Hands with the Devil	Paul Kagame	
2007	The Three Investigators and the Secret of Skeleton Island	Gamba	
2007	Soul Buddyz		TV series, director
2008	Jesus and the Giant		TV series, director
2009	Wole Soyinka: Child of the Forest		Director, documentary
2011	Man on Ground		Director
2013	End Game		TV series, director
2014	Hector and the Search for Happiness	African Boss	
2015	Tell Me Sweet Something		Director
2016	Wonder Boy for President	Kalu Akinrinsa	
2016	Queen of Katwe	Rwabushenyi President	
2016	Naked Reality	Madiba	
2016	Vaya		Director
2017	Catching Feelings	Joel	
2017	A Hotel Called Memory		Director
2019	The Ghost and the House of Truth		Director
2022	Rise	Bamidele	Director
2026	Marked		Director

== See also ==
- List of Nigerian actors
- List of Nigerian film directors
