= Empress Njamah =

Nigerian actress

- Born: November 17, 1980
- Citizenship: Nigerian
- Education: Olabisi Onabanjo University
- Occupation: Actor
- Years active: 1995
- Notable work: Girls Hostel; Missing Angel; Liberian Girl

Empress Njamah (November 16, 1980) is a Nigerian actress. In 2012, she was nominated for best-supporting actress at the Africa Movie Academy Awards but lost out to Terry Pheto.

== Personal life ==
Njamah's parents are of Nigerian and Cameroonian origins. She is a graduate of English from Olabisi Onabanjo University, Ogun State. She is the younger sister to John Njamah.

She once dated Timaya, but the relationship ended after becoming a subject of discussion on social media. Commenting on her marital status, she explained that she is not bothered by remaining single since her family is enlightened and understands that the ratio of women to men is uneven. She went further to explain that celebrity marriages do not last and there isn't any point in wasting funds for a wedding that will not stand the test of time. On the prevalence of "baby mama's" in Nollywood, she explained to The Punch that most single actresses with children regret their steps but are not bold enough to say that in public. She is a close friend to her colleague Ada Ameh in the film industry.

In 2019 she married fellow Nollywood actor Daniel Lloyd.

== Career ==
She started acting in 1995, and in 1999 appeared as a backup dancer in Tony Tetuila's "Your Kind of Woman" video. As part of her corporate social responsibility, she launched a foundation called House of Empress, which caters to kids with special needs. The foundation celebrated its 10th anniversary in 2016.

== Filmography ==
Year	Film	Role	Notes
2000	Girls Hostel	Tunica	With Uche Jombo
2001	She Devil	Ene	With Dakore Akande
2002	Valentino	Cecilia	With Jide Kososko
2002	The Pastor and the Harlot		
2003	You Broke My Heart		
2004	Last Girl Standing	Freda	With Jim Iyke
2004	Missing Angel	Julie	With Stella Damasus
2006	Liberian Girl	Sando	With Ernest Asuzu
2007	Cover Up	Chinasa	With Eucharia Anunobi
2008	Heartbeats	Rita	With Segun Arinze
2011	Count on Me	Cynthia	With Kalu Ikeagu
2015	Behind the Curtains	Barrister Judy	With Chucks Chyke
2017	Wife Material	Ene	With Alexx Ekubo
2018	June	Remi	With Uche Jumbo
2019	Upon a Promise	Esther	With Fredrick Leonard
2020	Lockdown	Anita	With Prince Fadaland
2021	Darling & Felix	Darlyn	With Mofe Duncan
2022	Unwanted	Toyin	With Joyce Bernard
