= Oladele Ajose =

Nigerian academic (1907–1978)

Omoba Oladele Ajose
- Born: Oladele Adebayo Ajose; 20 September 1907; Nigeria
- Died: 2 July 1978 (aged 70)

Oladele Adebayo Ajose (20 September 1907 – 2 July 1978) was a Lagos prince who was the vice-chancellor of the Obafemi Awolowo University. He was an early advocate of primary health care in Nigeria and the first tenured African professor at the University of Ibadan and in Nigeria. He was one of the earliest Africans to hold a professorial chair.

== Education and career ==
He attended Methodist Boys' High School, Lagos and King's College, Lagos for secondary education. He later moved abroad and went to study at the University of Glasgow from 1927 to 1932, graduating MB ChB in 1932, taking the Diploma in Public Health in 1935 and proceeding to a MD in 1939. His thesis title was Comparative study of Variola & Varicella in Nigeria. It was while in Glasgow that he met his wife: Beatrice Roberts. The couple returned to Nigeria in 1936, and later raised three daughters and a son.

He started his career as an assistant medical officer for health in Lagos. He was later promoted to the position of medical officer for health. As a health official, he started and promoted the British Red Cross Society of Nigeria, which later became known as the Nigerian Red Cross Society. He also established the Infectious Disease Hospital in Lagos. In 1948, with the creation of the University College, Ibadan, he left his administrative attire for university drapery and was appointed lecturer, and later professor of preventive medicine.

=== Early promoter of primary care ===
He was one of the earliest proponents of primary health care. He believed that public health issues should not only be limited to the rooms of academia but be brought to communities. He based his community health care effort at Ilora, a town in the then Oyo State. There, he made sure the community was involved in every step of decision making and choice of health care service. As part of the project, the community established fish ponds mostly stocked of tilapia fish; the ponds were built to provide ample protein for the citizens. The establishment of fish ponds around swamps later led to the creation of means of eradicating schistosomiasis in Ilora and also introduced a framework for nutrition provision in Nigeria and Africa.

In 1964, he contested the throne of Oba of Lagos with the eventual winner, Oba Oyekan.

His daughter is Ambassador Audrey Ajose.
