= Princess on a Hill =

Nigerian TV series

- Genre: Drama
- Created by: Abiola Sobo; Tolu Ajayi
- Written by: Bibi Ukpo (HW.); Adeniyi Adeniji; Sonia Nwosu
- Directed by: Abiola Sobo; Tolu Ajayi
- Starring: Efa Iwara; Mimi Chaka; Ireti Doyle; Femi Jacobs; Andrew Yaw Bunting; Norbert Young; Onyinye Odokoro; Bimbo Manuel; Toyin Oshinaike
- Theme music composer: Kulanen Ikyo
- Country of origin: Nigeria
- Original languages: English; Igbo; Yoruba
- No. of seasons: 1
- No. of episodes: 10

Production
- Executive producers: Chuka Ejorh; Folashayo Oke-Sobo; Tolu Ajayi; Abiola Sobo
- Producer: Folashayo Oke-Sobo
- Production locations: Lagos, Nigeria
- Cinematography: Mohammad Atta
- Editors: Laughter Ephraim; Ugbede Peter; Ayomikun Oteju
- Running time: 43–53 minutes
- Production companies: Blink Studios; Suss Productions; Saga City

Original release
- Network: Showmax
- Release: 7 November 2024

Princess on a Hill is a 2024 Nigerian Showmax original drama television series. It was created by Abiola Sobo and Tolu Ajayi, and executive produced by Chuka Ejorh, Folashayo Oke-Sobo, Tolu Ajayi, and Abiola Sobo. The series stars Norbert Young, Efa Iwara, Ireti Doyle, Femi Jacobs, Onyinye Odokoro, Bimbo Manuel, Andrew Yaw Bunting, and Mimi Chaka.

== Series overview ==
Episodes were released weekly on Thursdays.

Series	Episodes	Originally released	
Series	Episodes	First released	Last released
1	10	7 November 2024	9 January 2025

=== Season 1 (2024) ===
Princess on a Hill tells the story of Zara Osara, a young woman with big dreams who unexpectedly rises to the pinnacle of corporate power through a reality show competition she won, and makes her debut in the most powerful boardroom in the country. She must save the company from decline while resisting the dark influence of the enigmatic tyrant pulling her strings.

== Cast and characters ==
- Onyinye Odokoro as Zara Osara
- Bimbo Manuel as Moyosore Lawson
- Efa Iwara as Oz Obiora
- Mimi Chaka as Tolani Ivy Baker
- Ireti Doyle as Madam Obiora
- Femi Jacobs as Denloye
- Andrew Yaw Bunting as Menny
- Norbert Young as Etim Etim
- Toyin Oshinaike as Saheed
- Simi Drey as Kiki Jones
- Peter Oghenekaro as Chidi
- Ibrahim Suleiman as Asuquo
- Fadesaye Olateru-Olagbegi as Oyinkan
- John Kolawole as Mr Bello
- Tunde Daniels as Adegbite
- Emeka Golden as Kidnapper
- Kazeem Akanji as Sam Edet
- Honey Bamiro as Rolly
- Chibuikem Chris as Paul
- Austin Nonyelu as Mr Momoh
- Francis Onwuchei as Lawyer Odu
- Patrick Diabuah as Nkongho
- Seun Ajayi as Kayode
- Kingsley Chukwu as Mr Osita
- Eric Emeka as PJ
- Kayode Ojuolape as Korede
- Oladapo Carew as Mr Osara
- Olayemi Soyeju as Ruth Braithwaite
- Sunday Baba as Adamu Garba
- Victoria Akpan as Lawson Executive
- Nonso Bassey as Folusho "Damilola Lawson" Dada

== Production ==
=== Filming ===
On 4 September 2024, at the 2024 MIP Africa in Cape Town, an announcement was made by Showmax before the official teaser of Princess on a Hill was released, crediting Tolu Ajayi and Abiola Sobo as the creators of the series. Princess on a Hill, premiered in November 2024.

=== Casting ===
The cast was revealed on 14 October 2024 by Showmax, following the release of the official trailer for Princess on a Hill, with a line-up including Onyinye Odokoro, Bimbo Manuel, Efa Iwara, Mimi Chaka, Ireti Doyle, Femi Jacobs, Andrew Yaw Bunting, and Norbert Young.

== Premiere and release ==
On 14 October 2024, Showmax released the official trailer for Princess on a Hill. On 30 October 2024, Showmax announced that Princess on a Hill would premiere on 7 November 2024 at the 13th edition of the Africa International Film Festival. On 7 November 2024, Princess on a Hill was released on Showmax.

== Reception ==
=== Awards and nominations ===
Year	Award	Category	Recipient	Result	Ref
2025	Africa Magic Viewers' Choice Awards	Best Scripted Series	Princess on a Hill	Nominated	
2025	Africa Magic Viewers' Choice Awards	Best Editing	Princess on a Hill	Nominated	
2025	Africa Magic Viewers' Choice Awards	Best Writing TV Series	Princess on a Hill	Nominated	
2025	Africa Magic Viewers' Choice Awards	Best Lead Actor	Bimbo Manuel	Nominated	
2025	Africa Magic Viewers' Choice Awards	Best Supporting Actor	Efa Iwara	Nominated	
