= Soji Adejumo =

Nigerian politician

David Olusoji Adejumo is a Nigerian Professor of animal physiology and a frontline politician. He was the Chairman of the Oyo State Universal Basic Education Board.

== Early life ==
Soji Adejumo was born in the ancient caliphate city of Sokoto on Monday, December 3, 1956, into a Christian family of the late Reverend Canon Moses Oluyemi Adejumo, of Idi agbon compound. This was in the Agbeni area of Ibadan. His ancestral village is Aba Igbagbo (Agelu) in Iddo.

== Education ==
Adejumo started his early education at the Sacred Hearts Nursery school, Akure, in 1959 and concluded it at the St Mark's Primary School, Offa in Kwara State. For his post primary education he attended the prestigious Ibadan Grammar School between 1968 and 1974. Because of this, he gained admission to the Premier university in Nigeria, the University of Ibadan in 1975. He graduated from the university with Special Honors in Animal Science, Second Class (Upper Division), in 1976. He studied on the Federal Government of Nigeria Scholarship for his master's degree Program between 1979 and 1980. Adejumo had his doctorate degree on the scholarship of the University of Ibadan as a university scholar between 1980 and 1983.

== Academic career ==
In 1984, Professor Adejumo started his academic career as a lecturer in the department of Animal Science at the University of Ibadan. He was promoted to lecturer in 1986, elected Sub Dean (undergraduate) of the Faculty of Agriculture and Forestry in 1989, Senior Lecturer in 1991, Reader in 2002 and attained the rank of a professor in 2005. He has to his credit several scientific publications in international and National journals and supervised many students and research works.

== Political career ==
Soji Adejumo started his political career in the second republic when he joined the Unity Party of Nigeria. He was a founding member of the People's Solidarity Party which later formed alliance with the People's Front to form the Social Democratic Party (SDP). He was endorsed by the SDP for the Oyo South Senatorial ticket but he was persuaded to step down for the eventual occupant of the seat, Senator Rasheed Ladoja, in 1993. At the beginning of the fourth republic, he joined the People's Democratic Party and he has been an active party leader. As one of the leaders in the state and the country who is interested in the unity of the PDP, he has held series of meetings with other leaders across the country among whom is the former President Olusegun Obasanjo. He is a top governorship candidate in Oyo state and he declared his intention to govern the state on May 8, 2014, at a well-attended event.

== Positions and appointments ==
Adejumo has held several positions among which was Executive Chairman of the Oyo State Youth Development Council between 1998 and 2002. In 2007, he was appointed by the Executive Governor of the state, Otunba Adebayo Alao Akala as the Chairman of Universal Basic Education Board. His tenure as chairman SUBEB, was as eventful as it was full of awards. He conceived the noble idea of "Adopt a school" Programme which was aimed at promoting private involvement in infrastructural development in public schools. This programme resulted in an unprecedented public participation in school infrastructural and instructional development in over 200 school communities.

His tenure as the chairman also witnessed the mass recruitment of teachers. In his bid at ensuring strict discipline among teachers and the students, he established school marshals in public schools across the state. The Oyo State Universal Basic Education under his chairmanship, placed 2nd in the overall assessment for the 2006 UBE programme implementation intervention fund.
