= Kunle Bamtefa =

Nigerian actor

- Born: Kunle Bamtefa
- Occupation: Actor

Kunle Bamtefa is a Nigerian actor known for playing the role of "Uncle Pablo" in The Johnsons family sitcom and Chief Fuji in Fuji House of Commotion.

== Filmography ==
- Ose Sango (1991)
- Checkmate (1991-1994) as Chief Tajudeen
- Mortal Inheritance (1996) as Chief Morah
- Violated (1996)
- Saworoide (1999)
- Brass Bells (1999) as Ogagun Lagata
- Heritage (2003)
- The Johnsons (2012-2024) as Pablo
- All's Fair in Love (2024) as Dimeji
- Fuji House of Commotion
