= John Njamah =

Nollywood actor, producer, and director

- Born: April 17; Orlu, Imo State
- Education: Obafemi Awolowo University
- Occupations: film director, actor, producer
- Known for: My Flatmates, Tinsel
- Spouse: Agwi Tangi
- Relatives: Empress Njamah (sister)

John Njamah is a Nigerian actor, film producer, and film director. He is known for directing Fuji House of Commotion, Tinsel, Living In Lagos, Solitair, Casino, Emerald, Tide, and My Flatmates.

== Early life and education ==
Njamah was born on April 17 as a twin at Njaaba in Orlu local government of Imo State. He obtained his first degree from Obafemi Awolowo University where he studied dramatic arts. He is the elder brother of Nollywood actress, Empress Njamah.

== Personal life ==
Njamah is married to a Cameroonian, Agwi Tangi.

== Filmography ==
- Fuji House of Commotion
- Wounded Apple
- Tinsel (2008)
- Smash (2018)
- Zikora (2020)
- Emela (2020)
- Enitan (2022)
- My Flatmates (2017)
- Breathless (2015)
- Sparadise
