= Fuji House of Commotion =

Nigerian sitcom

- Genre: Nigerian sitcom
- Directed by: Amaka Igwe
- Starring: Kunle Bamtefa; Ngozi Nwosu; Ireti Doyle
- Country of origin: Nigeria

Production
- Producer: Amaka Igwe

Fuji House of Commotion is a Nigerian sitcom. Produced and directed by Amaka Igwe, the show was a spin-off of nineties soap opera Checkmate - one of the few Nigerian television programmes to have obtained that status.

It stars Kunle Bamtefa as Chief Fuji, Toun Oni as Mama Moji, Ngozi Nwosu as Peace, Louisa Onu as Ireti, Ireti Doyle as Caro, Jude Orhoha as Gbenro, John Njamah as Rabiu, and Chika Chukwu as Jumoke among others.

The sitcom revolves around a rich man (Chief T.A. Fuji) who is married to four women and had numerous kids to provide for. Some episodes also feature family friends such as Victor Eze as Alika.
