= Mak 'Kusare =

Nigerian film director

Mak ’Kusare
- Citizenship: Nigerian
- Occupation: film director

Mak ’Kusare is a Nigerian film director who won three awards for his first feature length film Ninety Degrees in 2006 at the Zuma Film Awards in Abuja, Nigeria. He wrote, directed and produced the film entirely on location in Jos, Nigeria. The film won Best Director, Best First Film/Video of a Director and Best Feature Film awards. ’Kusare has also produced for radio, television and video.

In 2003, he was part of the Produire Au Sud workshop for producers from Latin America, Asia and Africa, under the auspices of the festival of 3 continents. He returned to Nigeria graduating with a bachelor's degree in Industrial Design and Graphics/Motion Picture Production. 'Kusare attended the Cannes film festival, as a part of the Producers Network, seeking funds for his movie "90- Degrees" when he met South African filmmaker, Ramadan Suleman, who inspired him to simply get started.

He is the President and creative director of his privately owned production company Avehil Media Company, specialising in film and video productions for Cinema and TV and was awarded the British Council International Young Creative Entrepreneur (IYCE) (for TV and Motion Picture)

In 2006, he was commissioned by the Nigerian Film Corporation to direct a short film about deprivation, solitude and paranoia “Duty”. It was written by a renowned Nigerian film critic, Muritala Sule and shot on 16mm film gauge as part of an initiative to encourage celluloid film production. He is the founder of Film Factory Nigeria, a series of workshops geared towards training young people in all aspect of film production and imbibing in them good work culture with the aim of a better film production value.

His efforts and contributions to the Cinema of Nigeria is fast gaining international acclaim. ’Kusare has worked with the BBC World Service Trust as a director on the HIV/AIDS-awareness TV series Wetin Dey alongside other young directors. His other work for the BBC is "Sara's Choice", a film with a delay-sex-debut theme, targeted at young people.

He co-produced and directed David's Fall for Televista which ran on national television for almost one year. Other than Television Dramas, Mak 'Kusare produces and directs television commercials, and feature films. He directed "'Champions of our Time" which ran in Cinemas in Nigeria and won many international awards including the highly coveted Jury Prize at the 2011 FESPACO Film Festival, Ouagadougou. "Champions of Our Time" was his first film with mainstream Nollywood.

Filmography

2010 – David’s fall (TV Drama Series) Televista Associate Producer/ Director 2009 – Champions of our time (Feature Film) Macnuel Productions Director

2008 – SARA’S CHOICE (TV Drama) British Broadcasting Corporation BBC, WST/ NACA Director 2008 – COMRADE (Feature Film), Cormcrew/ Avehil Associate Producer, Director 2007 – Wetin Dey, BBC WST TV series. Series Director (Currently running on NTA network service) 2006- Short (16mm) feature Film, DUTY Director (for the Federal Ministry for Information and the Nigeria Film Corporation) 2006 – Feature Film, NINETY DEGREES. Writer, Producer, Director. 2005 – Ecklesia's Music video, HOLD THE DREAM.Director. 2004 – Documentary, A TOTAL FREEDOM OF SPIRIT, Writer, Producer and director 2003 – AIT TV Talk programme, LEGAL SCOPE. Producer. 2003 – AIT TV Magazine programme ORIENTAL EXPRESS. Producer. 1998/1999 - A.I.T TV sitcom COUNTRY PEOPLE Camera / Production Assistant / Continuity person. 1997 - A.I.T TV Drama Serial SCHOOL FOR MISCHIEF – actor.

AWARDS

FESPACO: ECOWAS Prize for integration for the Best West African Film. 2011 FESPACO: Special Jury prize for the Best TV/ VIDEO/ FICTION. 2011 THE GOLDEN MBONI PRIZE, Lola Kenya, 2010, Kenya. BEST PICTURE, Zuma Film Festival 2010. BEST FILM, Abuja International Film Festival, 2010 GRAND PRIX, THE LAGOS ADVERTISING AWARD. LAIF 2009 SCREEN PRODUCER OF THE YEAR Future Awards 2008 BRITISH COUNCIL YOUNG SCREEN ENTREPRENEUR YEAR AWARD, Nigeria, 2007. OFFICIAL SELECTION FOR TV/VIDEO COMPETITION, Fespaco, 2007. BEST DIRECTOR, Zuma Film Festival, 2006 BEST FIRST FILM/ VIDEO OF A DIRECTOR, Zuma 2006 BEST FEATURE FILM, Zuma, 2006.
