= Dickson Iroegbu =

Nigerian film director and producer

- Born: Dickson Nnamdi Iroegbu; Mbaise, Imo state, Nigeria
- Citizenship: Nigerian
- Education: Ahmadu Bello University
- Occupations: Director, Producer Screenwriter
- Years active: 1977

Dickson Nnamdi Iroegbu // is a Nigerian film director and producer. He has directed and produced several Nollywood hit movies. In 2005, at the maiden edition of the Africa Movie Academy Awards, Iroegbu won three awards for the movie The Mayors, including the awards for Best Picture, Best Screenplay and Best Director.

== Awards and nominations ==
Africa Movie Academy Awards:

- 2005: Best Director (won)
- 2005: Best Picture (won)
- 2005: Best Screenplay (won)

== Filmography ==
Year	Film	Credited as		
Year	Film	Director	Producer	Writer
2001	Days of Glory	Yes		Yes
2003	Romantic Attraction	Yes		
2004	The Mayors	Yes	Yes	Yes
2004	Unfaithful	Yes		
2004	Little Angel	Yes		Yes
2004	Last Wedding	Yes		
2004	Burning Desire	Yes		
2004	Beyond Reason	Yes		
2005	Women's Cot	Yes		
2005	Kill the Bride	Yes		
2006	The Devil in Her	Yes		
2006	Last Kiss	Yes		
2006	Holy Cross	Yes		
2006	Enemies in Love	Yes		
2006	Different World	Yes		
2006	Holy Cross	Yes		
2007	To Love an Angel	Yes		
2007	The Trinity	Yes		
2007	Big Heart Treasure	Yes		
2008	Critical Condition	Yes		Yes
2020	The Good Husband	Yes	Yes	Yes

== See also ==
- Ikenna Iroegbu (born 1995), American-born Nigerian basketball player for Hapoel Galil Elyon of the Israeli Basketball Premier League
