= Toyin Oshinaike =

Nigerian thespian and director

- Citizenship: Nigeria
- Occupation: Actor

Toyin Oshinaike is a Nigerian actor and director, known for his work in stage, film, and television.

== Early life and career ==
Oshinaike started his professional acting career in the early 1990s after initially working in the banking sector in 1993. Some of his theatre performances include portraying Elesin Oba in Wole Soyinka’s Death and the King's Horseman, and Obierika in Chinua Achebe’s Things Fall Apart, which toured the UK and USA in 1999. He considers one of his most challenging roles to be Baroka in Soyinka's The Lion and the Jewel, especially during a tour in England where he had to adapt the Nigerian character for a foreign audience.

== Filmography ==
- Princess on a Hill (2024 - present), Saheed
- House of Ga’a (2024), Chief Osi
- Iwájú (2024), Godspower (voice)
- Over the Bridge (2023), Baale
- Brotherhood (2022), D.P.O.
- Jolly Roger (2022), Officer Yaw
- The Griot (2021), Oladele
- This Is My Desire (2020), Vincent
- The Ghost and the House of Truth (2019), Joe
- Nigerian Prince (2018), Baba
- Queen Moremi: The Musical (2018), Alaiyemore
- Roti (2017), Daddy Juwon
- Our Best Friend's Wedding (2017), Civil Servant
- Gidi Blues (2016), Boatman
- Taxi Driver: Oko Ashewo (2015), Baba Miatura
- Dazzling Mirage (2014), Dr. Ayodele
- Confusion Na Wa (2013), Muri
- Small Boy (2008), Oyi
- Sango (film), Oluode

== Awards ==
In 2022, he was nominated for Best Actor in a Supporting Role at the African Movie Academy Awards for his role in Jolly Roger.
