= Amaka Igwe =

Nigerian filmmaker (1963–2014)

- Born: Uzoamaka Audrey Igwe; 2 January 1963; Port Harcourt, Rivers State, Nigeria
- Died: 28 April 2014 (aged 51); Enugu, Enugu State, Nigeria
- Education: Obafemi Awolowo University
- Occupations: Filmmaker, producer
- Years active: 1980s–2014
- Spouse: Charles Igwe (m. 1993)
- Children: 3

Amaka Igwe // (2 January 1963 – 28 April 2014) was a Nigerian filmmaker and broadcasting executive. She was the owner of Top Radio 90.9 Lagos and Amaka Igwe Studios and was recognised as one of the second-generation filmmakers who began the video film era of Nigerian cinema. Igwe has been regarded as a prominent figure in the Nigerian entertainment industry.

She died in 2014 from asthma complications and was posthumously commemorated with a Google Doodle in 2020.

== Early life and education ==
Uzoamaka Audrey "Amaka" Igwe was born to Isaac and Patience Ene on 2 January 1963 in Port-Harcourt, Rivers State. Igwe was the fifth of seven children and the fourth of six sisters. She was known as "GCO" (General Commanding Officer) by her father and "Storm" by her mother because she was always busy with some activity. As a child she acted as a minister of youth, sports and culture.

She studied at All Saints School and Awkunanaw Girls High School in Enugu State. She was involved in sports, including boxing and basketball, and was captain of the girls' football team. During her A-Levels at Idia College, Benin, Igwe began to teach the Atilogwu dance and competed nationally. She also began writing plays and songs. Igwe wanted to study law, but the Joint Admissions and Matriculation Board (JAMB) offered her education and religious studies (theology), which she studied at the University of Ife (now Obafemi Awolowo University).

From OAU, Igwe joined the M-Net short celluloid film Barbers Wisdom as a director and then proceeded to the University of Ibadan, where she obtained a master's degree in library and information sciences. She spent her time during her National Youth Service Corps (NYSC) as a travelling secretary for the Scripture Union. She then worked at the Anambra State University of Technology as an executive director at Eida Information Systems before settling in the creative industry. She married Charles Igwe in April 1993, and they had three children.

== Career ==
Igwe was a writer, producer, director, entrepreneur, and teacher. A pioneer of modern Nigerian TV drama and film, she gained national recognition as the writer and producer of the TV soap Checkmate and its spin-off Fuji House of Commotion. Her Nollywood projects include Rattle Snake and Violated, produced during the video film era of Nigerian cinema. She founded BOBTV Expo, and was the founder and CEO of Top Radio 90.9FM station, Amaka Igwe Studios, and Q Entertainment Networks.

== Legacy ==
Igwe is widely regarded for her contributions to Nollywood through her company, Amaka Igwe Studios, in improving production standards and mentoring many Nigerian filmmakers.

She has been described as a professional who valued training and family life and who was committed to the growth and sustainability of the creative industries.

== Honours and tribute ==
Igwe received several awards during her career. In 2011, she was honoured with the Member of the Order of the Federal Republic (MFR) in recognition of her contributions to Nigeria's creative industry.

On 2 January 2020, Google commemorated her 57th posthumous birthday with a Google Doodle.

== Death ==
Igwe died in Enugu on 27 April 2014, following complications from an asthma attack. Her funeral was attended by Rochas Okorocha, then governor of Imo State, as well as personalities from the Nollywood film industry.

== Filmography ==
- Rattle Snake 1,2 & 3 (1995)
- Violated 1&2 (1996)
- Forever (1997)
- To Live Again
- Full Circle
- A Barber's Wisdom (2001)

== TV series ==
- Fuji House of Commotion
- Solitaire
- Now We Are Married
- Infinity Hospital
- Bless This House
- Checkmate
