= Norbert Young =

Nigerian actor

- Citizenship: Nigerian
- Occupation: Actor
- Notable work: Checkmate
- Spouse: Gloria Young

Norbert Young is a Nigerian actor. He has appeared in series like Third Eye, Tinsel, and Family Circle. In addition to his work in television and films, Young has also appeared in several plays and stage productions.

== Personal life ==
Young is from Delta State, he is married to actress Gloria Young.

== Filmography ==
- Princess on a Hill (2024 - present) as Etim Etim
- The Man Died (2024 film)
- The Black Book (2023) as Mr. Craig
- Choke (2022)
- Lugard (2021) as Prof. Lambo
- Day of Destiny (2021) as Bankole
- RattleSnake: The Ahanna Story (2020) as Ali Mahmood
- Gold Statue (2019) as Antar
- King of Boys (2018) as Justice Nwachukwu
- Madam President (2017) as Faju Omola
- Checkmate
- Alan Poza (2013) as Managing Director
- Heroes & Zeroes (2012) as Nnamdi
- Living Funeral (film) (2013) as Mr. Dakup
- ZR-7:The Red House Seven (2011)
- Quicksand
- 30 Days (2006) as pastor Hart
- Edge of Paradise (2006) as Emeka
- Missing Angel (2004) as Pastor James
