= Bimbo Manuel =

Nigerian actor (born 1958)

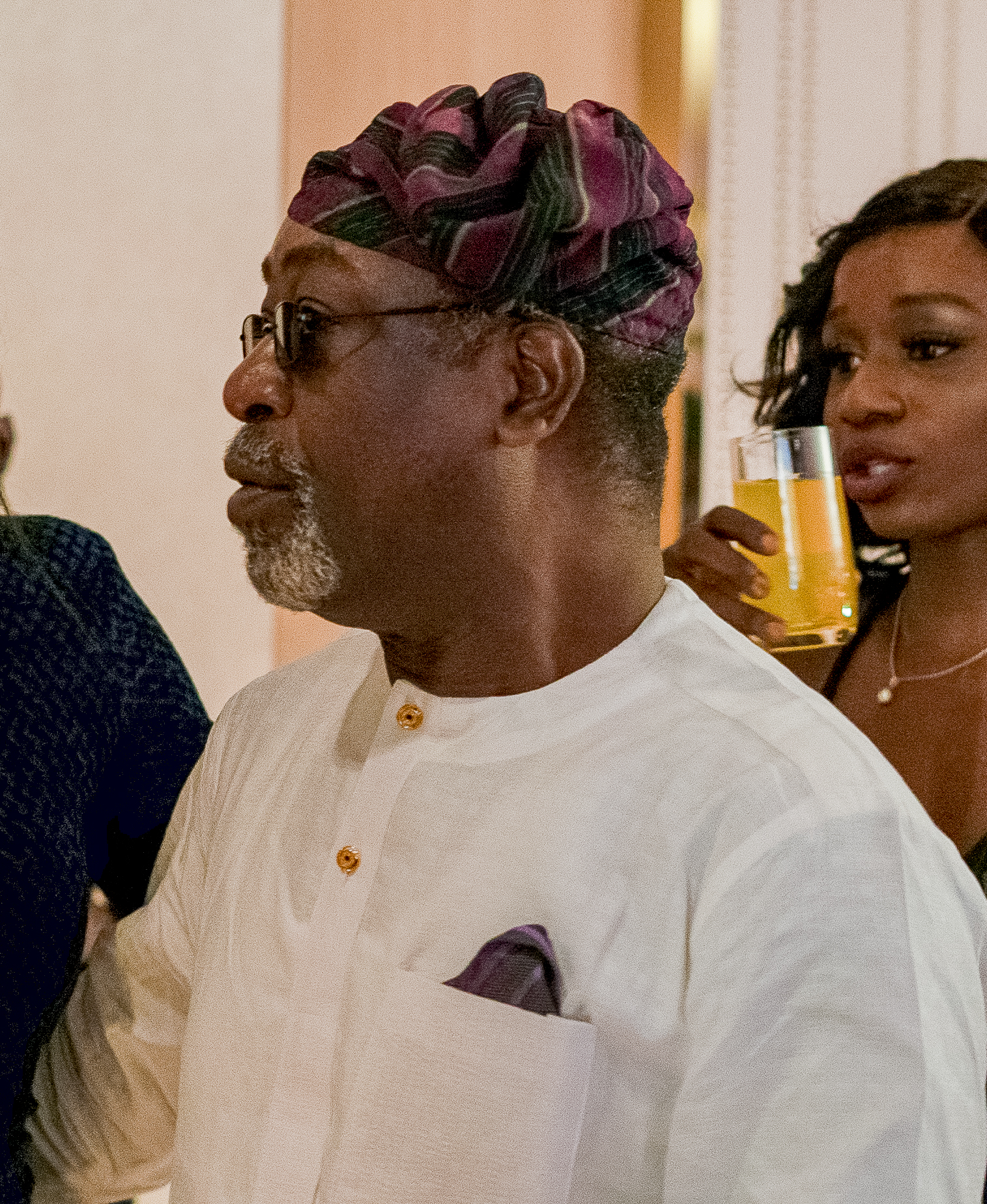
- Born: 30 October 1958 (age 67); Nigeria
- Citizenship: Nigeria
- Education: University of Port Harcourt
- Occupation: Nollywood Actor
- Years active: 1985–present

Bimbo Manuel (born 30 October 1958) is a Nigerian actor. He was nominated for Best Actor in a supporting role at the 2013 Nollywood Movies Awards.

== Career ==
Bimbo hails from Lagos State. After graduating from the University of Port Harcourt with a degree in Theater Arts, he began his television career in 1985 as a broadcaster at Ogun State Broadcasting Corporation (OGBC). He later moved to Ogun State Television (OGTV) before commencing his acting career in 1986. He is a professional actor who started his career on radio in entertainment. Apart from acting, he is also a writer and a producer.

== Personal life ==
In an interview, Manuel disclosed that he initially did not intend to marry, having preferred to remain single before eventually getting married.

== Selected filmography ==
=== Film ===
Year	Title	Role	Notes
2000	State of Emergency	Kevin	
2000	The Last Burial		
2001	Broad Day Light	Inspector Williams	
2002	Born 2 Suffer	Prince	
2003	Ayomida	Captain	
2004	Hell Bound		
2005	Women's Cot		
2006	Sitanda	Amanzee	
2007	The Mortal Man		
2008	Oromodie	Chief Aborisade	
2010	Tango with Me	Counsellor	
2011	Alero's Symphony	Dr. Coker	
2012	Heroes & Zeros	Amos Ayefele	
2013	Torn	Psychotherapist	
2014	Dazzling Mirage	Dr. Femi	
2014	Render to Caesar		
2014	October 1		
2015	Heaven's Hell		
2015	Shijuwomi		
2016	93 Days	Dr. Wasiu Gbadamosi	
2017	Banana Island Ghost	Baba God	
2017	King Invincible	Oba Adetoro	
2018	If I Am President	Elvis	
2018	Nigerian Prince	Smart	
2019	Seven	Mr. Tayo	
2020	Eyimofe	Clarence	
2021	Ayinla	Uncle Sam	
2021	Charge and Bail	Olisa Ossai	
2022	Blood Sisters	Priest	
2023	Blood Vessel	Ebiye	
2023	Breath of Life	Mr. Coker	
2024	House of Ga'a	Ashipa	

Year	Title	Role
1991	Checkmate (1991-1994)	Nduka Okereke
	Fuji House of Commotion	
2012	Tinsel	Dan Ade-Williams
2016	The Governor	David Ochello
2018	Castle and Castle	Duke Castle
2021	King of Boys: The Return of the King	Habib Mogaji
2024	Princess on a Hill	Moyosore Lawson
2025	The Party	
