= Africa Movie Academy Award for Best Screenplay =

The Africa Movie Academy Award for Achievement In Screen Play is an annual merit by the Africa Film Academy to recognise the best African films of the preceding year.

Best Screenplay
| Year | Film | Recipient | Result |
|---|---|---|---|
| 2005 | The Mayors | Dickson Iroegbu, Tai Emeka Obasi | Won |
| 2005 | Mastermind | | Nominated |
| 2005 | Afonja | | Nominated |
| 2005 | Yesterday | | Nominated |
| 2006 | Eagle's Bride | | Won |
| 2006 | Anini | | Nominated |
| 2006 | Behind Closed Doors | | Nominated |
| 2006 | Tanyaradzwa | | Nominated |
| 2006 | Arrou | | Nominated |
| 2007 | Sitanda | | Won |
| 2007 | Maroko | | Nominated |
| 2007 | Dancing Heart | | Nominated |
| 2007 | Azima | | Nominated |
| 2008 | Run Baby Run | | Won |
| 2008 | Checkpoint | | Nominated |
| 2008 | White Waters | | Nominated |
| 2008 | Across the Niger | | Nominated |
| 2008 | Mission to Nowhere | | Nominated |
| 2008 | 30 Days | | Nominated |
| 2009 | From a Whisper | Wanuri Kahiu | Won |
| 2009 | Seventh Heaven | Zainab Aziz | Nominated |
| 2009 | Through the Glass | Stephanie Okereke | Nominated |
| 2009 | Reloaded | Emem Isong | Nominated |
| 2009 | Beautiful Soul | Tchidi Chikere | Nominated |
| 2010 | I Sing of a Well | Leila Djansi | Won |
| 2010 | Seasons of a Life | Shemu Joyah | Nominated |
| 2010 | The Tenant | Jude Idada & Lucky Ejim | Nominated |
| 2010 | Freedom in Chains | | Nominated |
| 2010 | Guilty Pleasures | | Nominated |
| 2011 | Sinking Sands | Leila Djansi | Won |
| 2011 | Soul Boy | Hawa Essuman | Nominated |
| 2011 | Hopeville | | Nominated |
| 2011 | Shirley Adams | Oliver Hermanus | Nominated |
| 2011 | Izulu Lami | | Nominated |
| 2012 | Ties That Bind | Leila Djansi | Won |
| 2012 | Mr. and Mrs. | | Nominated |
| 2012 | How to Steal 2 Million | | Nominated |
| 2012 | Otelo Burning | | Nominated |
| 2012 | Unwanted Guest | | Nominated |
| 2012 | Two Brides And A Baby | | Nominated |
| 2013 | Heroes and Zeros | | Won |
| 2013 | Contract | | Nominated |
| 2013 | Ninah’s Dowry | | Nominated |
| 2013 | Alan Poza | Charles Novia | Nominated |
| 2013 | Blood and Henna | | Nominated |
| 2013 | Zama Zama | | Nominated |
| 2014 | Of Good Report | | Won |
| 2014 | Accident | | Nominated |
| 2014 | B for Boy | | Nominated |
| 2014 | Felix | | Nominated |
| 2014 | Potomanto | | Nominated |
| 2015 | Le President | | Won |
| 2015 | Love or Something Like That | | Nominated |
| 2015 | Run | | Nominated |
| 2015 | Timbuktu | | Nominated |
| 2015 | While You Slept | | Nominated |
| 2016 | Tell Me Sweet Something | | Won |
| 2016 | Beyond Blood | | Nominated |
| 2016 | The Cursed Ones | | Nominated |
| 2016 | Eye of the Storm | | Nominated |
| 2016 | The Visit | | Nominated |
| 2017 | Vaya | | Won |
| 2017 | Dora's Peace | | Nominated |
| 2017 | Félicité | | Nominated |
| 2017 | Oloibiri | | Nominated |
| 2017 | While We Live | | Nominated |
| 2018 | Hakkunde | | Won |
| 2018 | Five Fingers For Marseilles | | Nominated |
| 2018 | The Lost Café | | Nominated |
| 2018 | Ojukokoro | | Nominated |
| 2018 | Potato Potahto | | Nominated |
| 2018 | The Women | | Nominated |
| 2019 | Redemption | | Won |
| 2019 | The Delivery Boy | | Nominated |
| 2019 | Diamond in the Sky | | Nominated |
| 2019 | The God Statue | | Nominated |
| 2019 | Lara and the Beat | | Nominated |
| 2019 | The Last Victims | | Nominated |
| 2019 | Rafiki | Wanuri Kahiu, Jena Cato Bass | Nominated |
| 2019 | Up North | | Nominated |
| 2020 | The Fisherman’s Diary | | Won |
| 2020 | For Maria: Ebun Pataki | | Nominated |
| 2020 | The White Line | | Nominated |
| 2020 | 4th Republic | | Nominated |
| 2020 | Knuckle City | | Nominated |
| 2020 | 40 Sticks | | Nominated |
| 2020 | Perfect Picture: Ten Years Later | | Nominated |
| 2020 | 3 Days To Go | | Nominated |
| 2021 | Chasing Lullaby | | Pending |
| 2021 | Where I Come From | | Pending |
| 2021 | Stain | Morris Mugisha, Ronah Ninsiima | Nominated |
| 2021 | Collision Course | | Pending |
| 2021 | Hairareb | | Pending |
