= Africa Movie Academy Award for Best Film in an African Language =

The Africa Movie Academy Award for Best Film in an African Language is an annual merit by the Africa Film Academy to recognize the best African film in an indigenous language. It was first awarded in the first edition as Best Indigenous Film. However, it was renamed to Best Film in an African Language award from the 5th to 9th edition. Since the 10th edition it has been used to immortalize Sembene Ousmane and consequently renamed to Sembene Ousmane Awards for Best Film in African Language.

Best Film in an African Language
Year	Film	Language	Director	Result
2005	Ori			Won
2006	Izza			Won
2006	Mama Dearest			Nominated
2006	Agbara Oderest			Nominated
2006	Mfana Mbagha			Nominated
2007	Irapada	Yoruba	Kunle Afolayan	Won
2007	Apesin	Yoruba	Muyiwa Ademola	Nominated
2007	Abeni	Yoruba	Tunde Kelani	Nominated
2007	Iwalewa			Nominated
2008	Iranse Aje			Won
2008	Ipa			Nominated
2008	Hafsat			Nominated
2008	Onitemi			Nominated
2008	Tabou			Nominated
2009	Gugu and Andile	Zulu & Xhosa	Minky Schlesinger	Won
2009	Arugba	Yoruba	Tunde Kelani	Nominated
2009	Mah Sa-Sah	Cameroonian languages	Daniel Kamwa	Nominated
2009	Uyai	Ibibio	Emem Isong	Nominated
2009	Apaadi	Yoruba		Nominated
2010	Imani			Won
2010	Omo Iya Kan			Nominated
2010	Aldeweden			Nominated
2010	Togetherness Supreme			Nominated
2010	Game of my Life			Nominated
2011	Izulu lami	Zulu	Madoda Ncayiyana	Won
2011	Aramotu	Yoruba	Niji Akanni	Nominated
2011	Soul Boy	Swahili	Hawa Essuman	Nominated
2011	Suwi		Musola Catherine Kaseketi	Nominated
2011	Fishing The Little Stone		Kaz Kasozi	Nominated
2012	State of Violence	Zulu	Khalo Matabane	Won
2012	Chumo			Nominated
2012	Family on Fire			Nominated
2012	Otelo Burning	Zulu	Sara Bletcher	Nominated
2012	Asoni			Nominated
2013	Moi Zaphira			Won
2013	Elelwani	Venda	Ntshavheni Wa Luruli	Nominated
2013	The Last Fishing Boat		Shemu Joyah	Nominated
2013	Nairobi Half Life	Swahili; Sheng	David 'Tosh' Gitonga	Nominated
2013	Blood and Henna	Hausa	Kenneth Gyang	Nominated
2013	Sherifa			Nominated
2013	Kokomma	Ibibio	Tom Robson	Nominated
2014	B for Boy	Igbo	Chika Anadu	Won
2014	The Forgotten Kingdom	Southern Sotho	Andrew Mudge	Nominated
2014	Omo Elemosho	Yoruba	Bayo Tijani	Nominated
2014	Onye Ozi	Igbo	Obi Emelonye	Nominated
2014	Ni Sisi	Swahili	Nick Reding	Nominated
2015	Timbuktu	Tamasheq Bambara	Abderrahmane Sissako	Won
2015	Triangle Going To America	Amharic	Theodros Teshome Kebede	Nominated
2015	Chetanna	Igbo	Ikechukwu Onyeka	Nominated
2015	Juliet And Romeo			Nominated
2015	iNumber Number	Zulu		Nominated
2016	Missing God	Igbo	Ubaka Joseph Ugochukwu	Won
2016	Bala Bala Sese	Luganda	Lukyamuzi Bashir	Nominated
2016	Brotherhood Eye	Bambara	Mamadou Fadiala Keïta	Nominated
2016	Cursed Treasure			Nominated
2016	Wako			Nominated
2016	Daggers of Life (Agbe Fe Akumehewo)	Afrikaans	Paapa Otoo	Nominated
2017	Félicité	Lingala	Alain Gomis	Won
2017	Logun Ofe	Yoruba	Rasaq Olayiwola	Nominated
2017	Call Me Thief	Afrikaans	Daryne Joshua	Nominated
2017	Vaya	Zulu	Akin Omotoso	Nominated
2018	Five Fingers for Marseilles	Xhosa, Sesotho	Michael Matthews	Won
2018	Mansoor	Hausa	Ali Nuhu	Nominated
2018	Icheke Oku	Igbo	Emeka Amakeze	Nominated
2018	Agwaetiti Obiuto	Igbo	Onyeka Nwelue	Nominated
2018	Nyasaland		Joyce Mhango-Chavula	Nominated
2018	Tunu	Swahili	Jordan Riber	Nominated
2019	Rafiki	Swahili	Wanuri Kahiu	Won
2019	Make Room	Hausa	Robert Peters	Nominated
2019	Mabata Bata	Tsonga	Sol de Carvalho	Nominated
2019	Bahasha	Swahili	Jordan Riber	Nominated
2019	Azali	Dagbani, Akan	Kwabena Gyansah	Nominated
2020	The Milkmaid	Hausa	Desmond Ovbiagele	Won
2020	Knuckle City	Xhosa	Jahmil X.T. Qubeka	Nominated
2020	This Is Not a Burial, It's a Resurrection	Sotho	Lemohang Jeremiah Mosese	Nominated
2020	Fiela’s Child	Afrikaans	Brett Michael Innes	Nominated
2020	The White Line	Afrikaans	Desiree Kahikopo-Meiffret	Nominated
2021	The Gravedigger’s Wife	Somali	Khadar Ahmed	Won
2021	Bangarang	Swahili	Robin Odongo	Nominated
2021	Ayinla	Yoruba	Tunde Kelani	Nominated
2021	Hotel on the Koppies		Charlie Vundler	Nominated
2021	Nyara		Ram Ally Kasongo	Nominated
2021	Stain		Morris Mugisha	Nominated
