= Sadiq Sani Sadiq =

Nigerian film actor (born 1981)

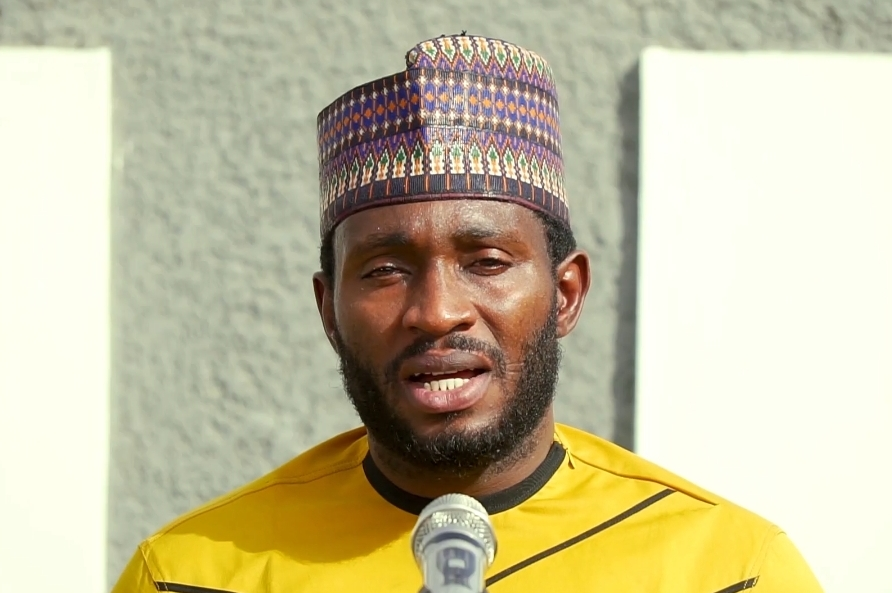
- Born: 2 February 1981 (age 45); Jos, Plateau State, Nigeria
- Occupation: Film Actor
- Years active: 2004 - Present
- Spouse: Murja Shehu
- Children: 2
- Awards: 2015 Kannywood Awards

Sadiq Sani Sadiq (born 2 February 1981) is a Nigerian film actor. In 2012, he appeared in Blood and Henna, a Nigerian film directed by Kenneth Gyang, along with Nafisat Abdullahi and Ali Nuhu. He has received awards and nominations including 2015 Kannywood Awards in jurors award category organized by MTN Nigeria. He was also awarded by the City People Entertainment award in 2014 and 2017. He is married with two children.

== Awards ==
| Year | Award | Category | Result |
|---|---|---|---|
| 2014 | City People Entertainment Awards | Best New Actor | Nominated |
| 2015 | Kannywood Awards | Best Actor | Won |
| 2017 | City People Entertainment Awards | Best Actress | Nominated |
| 2018 | Kannywood Awards | Best Actor | Won |

== Filmography ==
Sadiq has been cast in more than 200 Kannywood movies.

| Title | Year |
|---|---|
| Addini Ko Al’ada | ND |
| Ga Fili Ga Mai Doki | ND |
| Har Abada | ND |
| Inda Rai | ND |
| Jari Hujja | ND |
| Larai | ND |
| Gani Ina So | ND |
| Rawar Gani | ND |
| Sakayya | ND |
| Tsangaya | ND |
| Waye Isashshe | ND |
| Yar Mama | ND |
| Bana Bakwai | 2007 |
| Artabu | 2009 |
| Ummi Adnan | 2011 |
| Sa’ar Mata | 2011 |
| Adamsy | 2011 |
| Abu Naka | 2012 |
| Blood and Henna | 2012 |
| Dan Marayan Zaki | 2012 |
| Dare Daya | 2012 |
| Kara Da Kiyashi | 2012 |
| NI Da Kai Da Shi | 2012 |
| Noor (The Light) | 2012 |
| Talatu | 2012 |
| Ukuba | 2012 |
| Zo Muje | 2012 |
| Farin Dare | 2013 |
| Hijira | 2013 |
| Makahon So | 2013 |
| Rai Dangin Goro | 2013 |
| Rayuwa Bayan Mutuwa | 2013 |
| Tsumagiya | 2013 |
| Ashabul Kahfi | 2014 |
| Ya Daga Allah | 2014 |
| Bayan Duhu | 2014 |
| Daga Ni Sai Ke | 2014 |
| Hanyar Kano | 2014 |
| Kisan Gilla | 2014 |
| Mati Da Lado | 2014 |
| Sabuwar Sangaya | 2014 |
| Suma Mata Ne | 2014 |
| Alkalin Kauye | 2015 |
| Halacci | 2015 |
| Sallamar So | 2015 |
| Kasa Ta | 2015 |
| Jamila | 2016 |
| Nisan Kiwo | 2016 |
| Shinaz | 2016 |
| Ba Tabbas | 2017 |
| Rariya | 2017 |
| Dangin Miji | 2017 |
| Larura (The Necessity TV Series) | 2017 |
| Makaryaci | 2017 |
| Wacece Sarauniya | 2017 |
| Abbana | 2018 |
| Nisan Kwana | 2019 |
| Fansar Kauna | 2019 |
| Bana Bakwai | 2020 |
| Sarkin Barayi | 2020 |
| Labarina (TV series) | 2023 |

== See also ==
- List of Nigerian actors
- List of Kannywood actors
