= Africa Movie Academy Award for Best Costume Design =

Africa Movie Academy Award - Best Costume

The Africa Movie Academy Award for Best Costume Design is an annual merit by the Africa Film Academy to reward films with the best costume for the year. It was introduced in 2005 as Best Costume

Best Costume
Year	Film	Costumier	Result
2005	Mastermind		Won
2005	Dabi-Dabi		Nominated
2005	Eye of the Gods		Nominated
2005	Afonja		Nominated
2006	Eagle's Bride		Won
2006	Secret Adventure		Nominated
2006	Rising Moon		Nominated
2006	Arrou		Nominated
2007	Apesin		Won
2007	Azima		Nominated
2007	The Amazing Grace		Nominated
2007	Bunny Chow		Nominated
2008	Princess Tyra		Won
2008	Rivals		Nominated
2008	Mirror of Beauty		Nominated
2008	30 Days		Nominated
2008	New Jerusalem		Nominated
2009	Arugba		Won
2009	Agony of the Christ		Nominated
2009	Apaadi		Nominated
2009	Live to Remember		Nominated
2009	Seventh Heaven		Nominated
2010	I Sing of a Well		Won
2010	Perfect Picture'		Nominated
2010	Prince’s Bride		Nominated
2010	The Child		Nominated
2010	Lilies of the Ghetto		Nominated
2011	Aramotu		Won
2011	Inale		Nominated
2011	Yemoja		Nominated
2011	Sinking Sands		Nominated
2011	Elmina		Nominated
2012	Adesuwa		Won
2012	The Captain Of Nakara		Nominated
2012	Rugged Priest		Nominated
2012	Somewhere in Africa		Nominated
2012	Queen's Desire		Nominated
2013	Blood and Henna		Won
2013	The Twin Sword		Nominated
2013	Elelwani		Nominated
2013	Virgin Magarida		Nominated
2013	The Meeting		Nominated
2013	Cobweb		Nominated
2014	Ni Sisi		Won
2014	Good Old Days: Love of AA		Nominated
2014	Apaye		Nominated
2014	Omo Elemosho		Nominated
2014	The Forgotten Kingdom		Nominated
2015	October 1		Won
2015	Run		Nominated
2015	iNumber Number		Nominated
2015	Njinga: Queen Of Angola		Nominated
2015	Dazzling Mirage		Nominated
2016	Eye of the Storm		Won
2016	Oshimiri		Nominated
2016	The Cursed Ones		Nominated
2016	Ayanda		Nominated
2016	A Soldier's Story		Nominated
2017	Queen of Katwe		Won
2017	Ayamma		Nominated
2017	Keteke		Nominated
2017	The Last Of Us		Nominated
2017	Logun Ofe		Nominated
2018	Isoken		Won
2018	Icheke Oku		Nominated
2018	Cross Roads		Nominated
2018	Esohe		Nominated
2018	Five Fingers for Marseilles		Nominated
2019	The Mercy of the Jungle		Won
2019	Lara and the Beat		Nominated
2019	Rafiki		Nominated
2019	Sew the Winter to My Skin		Nominated
2019	King of Boys		Nominated
2019	Urgent (2018 film)		Nominated
2019	Mabata Bata		Nominated
2019	Light in the Dark		Nominated
2020	This is Not A Burial, It’s a Resurrection		Won
2020	Heroes of Africa; Tette Quarshie		Nominated
2020	The White Line		Nominated
2020	Ibi (The Birth)		Nominated
2020	Foreigner’s God		Nominated
2021	African American		Won
2021	Buried		Nominated
2021	Oba Bi Olorun		Nominated
2021	Tecora		Nominated
2021	Eagle Wings		Nominated
