= 2015 Kannywood Awards =

- Date: January 31, 2015
- Location: Abuja
- Country: Nigeria
- Hosted by: Ahmad Muhammad Sani

Television/radio coverage
- Network: BBC Hausa

The 2015 Kannywood Awards was the 2nd edition of the ceremony supported and sponsored by MTN Nigeria and took place in Abuja, the capital of Nigeria on January 31, 2015. The event was hosted by the Emir of Gumel, Ahmad Muhammad Sani.

== Winners of the 2015 Kannywood Awards ==
List of Awards

=== Popular Choice Awards ===
- Best Actor – Ali Nuhu
- Best Actress – Nafisat Abdullahi
- Best Director – Yasin Auwal
- Best Comedian – Rabilu Musa Dalasan (Ibro)

=== Jurors Awards ===
- Best Film: Ashabul Kahfi
- Best Actor: Sadiq Sani Sadiq for Dinyar Makaho
- Best Actress – Hadiza Aliyu for Daga Ni Sai Ke
- Best Director – Aminu Saira for Ashabul Kahfi & Sabuwar Sangaya
- Best Supporting Actor – Mustapha Nabraska for Basaja Takun Karshe
- Best Supporting Actress – Fati Washa for ‘Ya Daga Allah
- Best Comedian – Rabilu Musa Danlasan (Ibro) for Andamali
- Best Cinematography – Ahmad Bello for Sarki Jatau
- Best Villain – A’isha Dankano for Uwar Mugu
- Best Costume – Zubairu I. Ataye for Sarki Jatau
- Best Make-Up – Suji J & I. Indabawa for Ashabul Kahfi
- Best Script – Rahma A. Majid for Suma Mata Ne
- Best Child Actor – Rahma Yasir for Gudan Jini
- Best Set Design – Faruk Sayyadi for Ashabul Kahfi
- Best Music – A. Alfazazi for Saki Kowa
- Best Visual Effect – Muhammad Ali for Saki Kowa
- Best Sound – Sani Candy for Sabuwar Sangaya
- Best Editor – Musa SB Dangi for Sarki Jatau
