= List of Hausa films =

List of Hausa-language films

Hausa films are films produced mainly in the Hausa language, within the Nigerian film industry known as Kannywood. The industry is located in Kano, Nigeria, and is one of the regional film industries in Africa.

This is a list of Hausa films.

== A ==
- Ali Yaga Ali

== D ==
- Dan Marayan Zaki
- Dakin Amarya

== G ==
- Gwaska
- Gidan Badamasi

== K ==
- Kwana Casa'in

== M ==
- Mansoor

== S ==
- Sangaya

== See also ==
- Kannywood
- List of Nigerian film stars
