= List of Nigerian films of 2009 =

This is a list of Nigerian films released in 2009.

== Films ==
Title	Director	Cast	Genre	Notes	Ref
2009
Forbidden Fruit	Frank Rajah Arase	John Dumelo Majid Michel Jackie Appiah Yvonne Nelson		5 nominations at the 6th Africa Movie Academy Awards	
Guilty Pleasures	Desmond Elliot	Ramsey Nouah Majid Michel Nse Ikpe Etim Mercy Johnson Omoni Oboli		Africa Movie Academy Award for Best Screenplay nomination	
Naked Girls 1 and 2	Cyril Jackson	Vincent Opurum Sean Blessed Tonto Dike Enebeli Elebuwa		Shot in English Released on VCD by Frontmaster	
Nigerian Girls 1 and 2	Dandy Chukwuemeka Echefu	Uche Elendu Emeka Enyiocha McMorris Ndubueze Udochi Anthony		Shot in English Language Released on DVD by Golden Movies/Zodiac Films	
Reloaded	Lancelot Oduwa Imasuen	Ramsey Nouah Stephanie Okereke Uche Jombo Van Vicker Nse Ikpe Etim	Romantic drama	3 nominations at the 5th Africa Movie Academy Awards	
The Figurine (Araromire)	Kunle Afolayan	Kunle Afolayan Ramsey Nouah Omoni Oboli Funlola Aofiyebi-Raimi	Thriller	Shot in English Released on DVD by Golden Effects.	

== See also ==
- List of Nigerian films
