= Blood and Henna =

- Directed by: Kenneth Gyang
- Screenplay by: Kenneth Gyang; Nura Akilu
- Produced by: Nura Akilu; Kenneth Gyang; Ali Nuhu
- Starring: Ali Nuhu; Sadiq Sani Sadiq; Nafisat Abdullahi; Ibrahim Daddy; Beauty Sankey; Salihu Bappa
- Cinematography: Ifeanyi Iloduba
- Edited by: Abdul-Jabbar Ahmad
- Production company: Newage Networks
- Release date: 2012
- Running time: 105 minutes
- Country: Nigeria
- Language: Hausa

Blood and Henna is a 2012 Nigerian film directed by Kenneth Gyang, starring Ali Nuhu, Sadiq Sani Sadiq and Nafisat Abdullahi. The film tries to narrate the ordeal of the 1996 Pfizer Clinical Test in Kano, Nigeria. It received 6 nominations at the 9th Africa Movie Academy Awards, and eventually won only the award for Best Costume Design.

== Plot ==
Set in a 1996 Nigeria, a Lagos shop-owner, Musa returns to his hometown in Northern Nigeria after his shop was set ablaze in Lagos due to political unrests in the state by opposing parties. Musa is warmly welcomed back to his village by everyone, especially two of his very close friends. One of his friends, Shehu, a journalist very critical of the present military government had to quit his job to teach in a community school. Saude's father is the wealthiest farmer in the village. He married off Saude to Musa after He expanded his father's business with his expertise in farming. The couple were having a perfect marriage until she began to have a series of miscarriages. A deadly infection spreads through the village which threatens the very existence of the community.

== Cast ==
- Sadiq Sani Sadiq
- Nafisat Abdullahi
- Ali Nuhu
- Ibrahim Daddy
- Beauty Sankey
- Salihu Bappa
- Yachat Sankey

== Release ==
A trailer for the film was released on November 25, 2011.

== Accolades ==
List of Major Awards
Award	Category	Recipients and nominees	Result
Africa Film Academy (9th Africa Movie Academy Awards)	Achievement in Production Design		Nominated
Africa Film Academy (9th Africa Movie Academy Awards)	Achievement in Costume Design		Won
Africa Film Academy (9th Africa Movie Academy Awards)	Achievement in Screenplay	Kenneth Gyang	Nominated
Africa Film Academy (9th Africa Movie Academy Awards)	Best Nigerian film	Kenneth Gyang	Nominated
Africa Film Academy (9th Africa Movie Academy Awards)	Best film in an African Language	Kenneth Gyang	Nominated
Africa Film Academy (9th Africa Movie Academy Awards)	Best Supporting Actor	Ali Nuhu	Nominated
