= ETV Ghana =

Ghanaian TV channel

e.tv Ghana
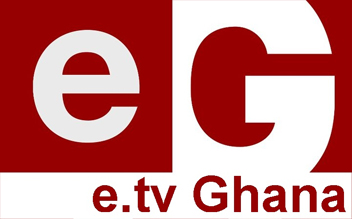
- Country: Ghana
- Broadcast area: Ghana
- Headquarters: Accra

Programming
- Language(s): English

Ownership
- Owner: e.tv

History
- Launched: October 2009

Links
- Website: http://www.etvghana.com

e.tv Ghana also known as ETV Ghana is a free-to-air terrestrial television network broadcasting 24-hours a day from Accra since its launch in October 2009. As of December 2011 it will also commence terrestrial transmissions in Kumasi. Beyond Accra and Kumasi, it is available via satellite on First Digital TV and SMART TV. It is privately owned TV in Accra.

== History ==
The TV station was born of a partnership between Global Media Alliance (GMA) and Sabido Group, parent company of e.tv, the largest English-medium channel in South Africa. e.tv Ghana operates under Global Media Alliance’s broadcasting company (GMABC).

Edward Boateng is the Chairman of the Board of Directors and renowned Ghanaian film and TV personality Jot Agyeman is e.tv Ghana’s Station Manager.

== Programming ==
e.tv Ghana’s programming falls into six broad categories: entertainment; talkshows; sports; current affairs; drama; and movies. It also broadcasts special major one-off events, children’s programming and comedy shows.

e.tv Ghana has historically invested heavily in local talent and programming and supplements its local content with shows imported from South Africa and the United States. About 30-40% of its prime time programming is locally produced. Its local acquisitions are a mix of in-house shows and co-productions with local production companies. Locally produced shows include Awake, The Be Bold Show, 100 Degrees, Meet the Girls, The Late Night Celebrity Show and Sports Lounge. South African shows include the hit-soapies Rhythm City and Scandal! and international imports include How I Met Your Mother and WWE Wrestling.

== News ==
e.tv Ghana has an in-house news production department that focuses on national and business news content for its website and local and international news stories for its television transmissions. The main nightly news programme is called Prime News and is fronted by Gideon Aryeequaye in a 20:00h slot. The main business news programme is fronted by Christal Jeanne and is called eBusiness Journal, airing prior to Prime News at 19:30h.

In addition to regular news updates broadcast during the day, e.tv Ghana also airs a daily news programme from parent station e.tv South Africa at 18:00h, eNCA.
