= Hadiza Aliyu =

Nigerian actress (born 1989)

Hadiza Aliyu Gabon
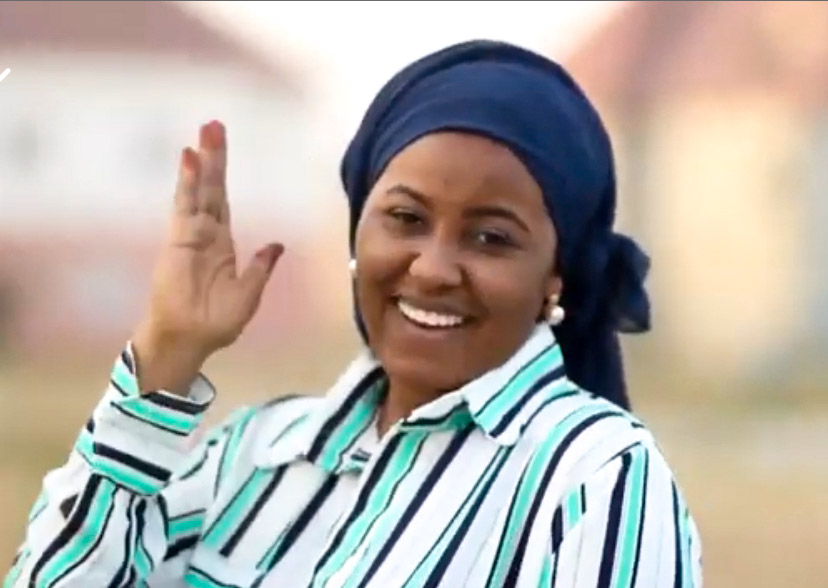
- Hadiza Aliyu Gabon performing the song titled "Adnan"
- Born: Hadiza Aliyu; 1 June 1989 (age 37); Libreville, Gabon
- Occupations: Actress, film maker
- Years active: 2009–present
- Notable credit: Best known for her appearance in Ali Yaga Ali
- Awards: See below

Hadiza Aliyu (born 1 June 1989), also known as Hadiza Gabon, is a Nigerian actress and filmmaker who appears in both Hausa and English language films. She serves as an ambassador for MTN Nigeria and Indomie noodles. Aliyu was named best actress at 2013 Best of Nollywood Awards and won at the 2nd Kannywood/MTN Awards in 2014. She is the founder of HAG Foundation.

== Early life and family ==
Hadiza Aliyu was born on 1 June 1989 in Libreville, Gabon, and is the daughter of elder statesman, Mallam Aliyu. She is of Gabonese descent on her father's side and Fulani ancestry from Adamawa State, Nigerian on her mother's side. Aliyu attended primary and secondary schools in her birth country, where she took her A-Level exams with the goal of becoming a lawyer. She later chose law as her preferred degree course. She began her university year as a student, but had to withdraw due to some issues that hampered her studies. Aliyu's education was halted at the time, allowing her to pursue a diploma program in French language and later work as a French language teacher in a private school.

== Acting career ==
Aliyu joined Kannywood after arriving in Nigeria from Gabon. She relocated from Adamawa to Kaduna after deciding to join the Kannywood film industry with her cousin. Aliyu met Ali Nuhu a few days after arriving in Kaduna and asked for his help in becoming an actress. She made her debut in Artabu in 2009, and rose to prominence in the Hausa film industry.

Aliyu, like Ali Nuhu, Sani Musa Danja, Yakubu Muhammed, Maryam Booth, and Rahama Sadau, decided to join Nollywood in 2017. She appeared in her first Nollywood film, Lagos Real Fake Life, alongside Mike Ezuruonye, Mark Angel, and Emmanuella.

== Scandal ==
In 2019, the Chief Magistrate Court ordered the arrest of Aliyu for failing to appear in court to address allegations made against her by her colleague, Mustapha Naburaska.

In late 2022, Aliyu was also accused of breaking a promise she allegedly made to a man named Bala Musa, a civil servant in his late forties. He claimed that they had agreed to marry after he spent ₦396,000 on her, but she ultimately refused. Aliyu later stated that she did not know the man at all.

Aliyu has never been married. The child previously rumoured to be her daughter has been confirmed to be her niece—the daughter of her sister, Maryam Gabon.

== Gabon's Room Talk Show ==
Gabon's Room Talk Show is a syndicated Hausa language talk show produced and hosted by Hadiza. It premiered on September 19, 2022, with its debut episode featuring Dauda Kahutu Rarara and Sa'adatu Lawan as guests. Inspired by Ellen and Koffee with Karan, Gabon's Room Talk Show gained significant attention. However, some critics have suggested that Hadiza lacks the necessary background and expertise to host a talk show. Despite these criticisms, the show remains a widely discussed and popular program. The show explores topics relevant to Hausa-speaking audiences, including culture, entertainment, and social issues. It also features a diverse range of guest including celebrities, thought leaders, and influencers.

== Filmography ==
List of films by Aliyu:

Year	Title	Role	Genre
	Daina Kuka	Actress	Drama
	Farar Saka	Actress	Drama
	Fataken Dare	Actress	Drama
	Kolo	Actress	Drama
	Mukaddari	Actress	Drama
	Sakayya	Actress	Drama
	Umarnin Uwa	Actress	Drama
	Ziyadat	Actress	Drama
2009	Artabu	Actress	Drama
2010	Wasila	Actress	Drama
2010	Umarnin Uwa	Actress	Drama
2012	Aisha Humaira	Actress	Drama
2012	'Yar Maye	Actress	Drama
2012	Badi Ba Rai	Actress	Drama
2012	Akirizzaman	Actress	Drama
2012	Dare Daya	Actress	Drama
2012	Wata Tafi Wata	Actress	Drama
2013	Da Kai Zan Gana	Actress	Drama
2013	Haske	Actress	Drama
2013	Ban Sani Ba	Actress	Drama
2014	Mai Dalilin Aure	Actress	Drama
2014	Daga Ni Sai Ke	Actress	Drama
2014	Ali Yaga Ali	Actress	Drama
2014	Basaja Takun Karshe	Zee	Drama
2014	Uba Da 'Da	Actress	Drama
2014	Indon Kauye	Actress	Comedy/drama
2014	Ba'asi	Actress	Drama
2014	Jarumta	Actress	Drama
2017	Gida da waje	Actress	Drama
2017	Ciki Da Raino	Actress	Comedy/drama
2018	Lagos Real Fake Life	Halimah	Drama
2019	Hauwa Kulu	Hauwa (older)	Drama
2019	Wakili	Actress	Drama
2019	Dan Birnin	Huwaila	Drama
2019	Gidan Badamasi	Tani	Comedy/drama

== Honors and awards ==
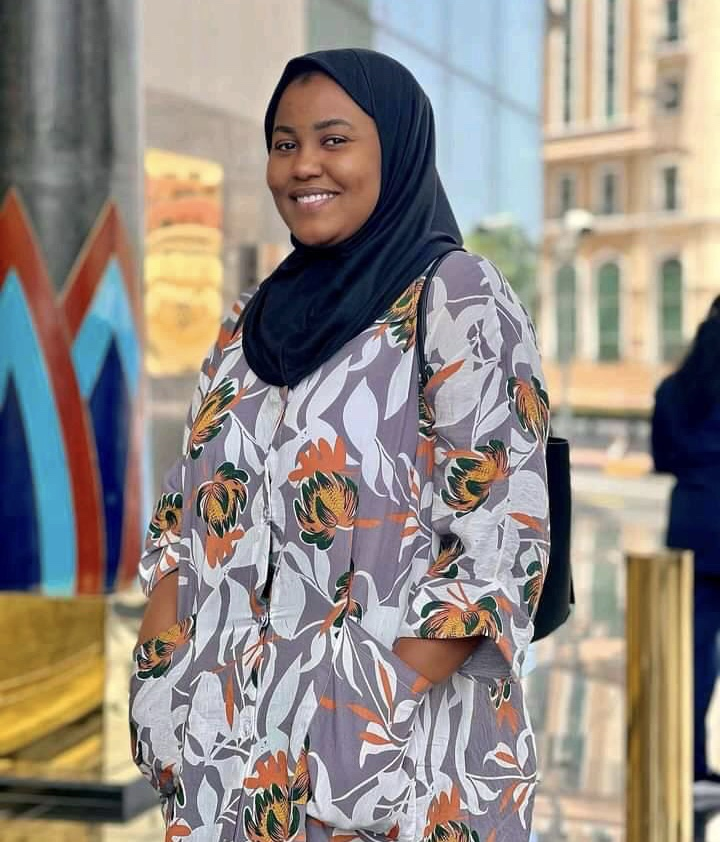
Hadiza Aliyu Gabon

Aliyu has received several awards, including the 2013 Best of Nollywood Awards and the 2nd Kannywood/MTN Awards in 2014. In 2013, she was honored by the then governor of Kano State, Dr. Rabiu Musa Kwankwaso, in recognition of her career as an actress. She was also named Best Actress by the African Hollywood Awards.

=== Awards ===
List of awards received by Aliyu:

Year	Award	Category	Film	Result
2013	Kwankwasiyya Award	Recognition Award		Won
2013	2013 Best of Nollywood Awards	Best Actress (Hausa)	Babban Zaure	Won
2014	City People Entertainment Awards	Best Actress (Hausa)	Babban Zaure	Nominated
2014	2nd Kannywood/MTN Awards	Best Actress of the Year(Jury Choice)	Daga Ni Sai Ke	Won
2015	Kannywood AWA 24 Film & Merit Award	Best Supporting Actress	Ali Yaga Ali	Won
2016	African Hollywood Awards	Best Actress	African films in Hausa language	Won
2017	Arewa Night Award	Recognition Award		Won
2017	2017 Best of Kannywood Award	Best Actress (Hausa)		Nominated

=== Honors ===
List of honors received by Hadiza Aliyu:

Year	Honor	Category	Section
2016	Kano State Senior Secondary Schools Management Board	Certificate of Appreciation	Educational Support
2016	Statup Kano	Certificate of Appreciation	Empowerment Support
2016	Billycares Charity Foundation	Recognition Award	Philanthropy
2019	Hausa Students Association of Nigeria (BUK)	Recognition Award	Educational Support

== Brand ambassador ==
In December 2018, Aliyu was unveiled by NASCON Allied Plc, a subsidiary of the Dangote Group as Dangote Classic Seasoning's brand ambassador during the official launch of the seasoning product in Kano.

== Charitable activities ==
In 2016, Aliyu founded a charitable organization called the HAG Foundation, aimed at improving the lives of ordinary people by way of providing help in the educational and healthcare sectors as well as food security.

In March 2016, Aliyu visited an internally displaced persons camps in Kano State where she donated food items, textile materials and other tangible items needed by the camp's inhabitants displaced by the northern Nigerian violence.
