= Ekow Freeman =

Ghanaian actor

- Born: Ekow Freeman; Ghana
- Citizenship: Ghanaian
- Occupations: Film, television actor
- Known for: Rhapsody of love, Hot fork, Welcome home, force marriage

Prince Ekow Freeman is a Ghanaian actor, known for movies such as I Sing of a Well and Rhapsody Of Love.

== Career ==
Ekow has starred in a number of movies. He used to be the chairman of the Project Committee of Felvic Aviation Events and the Former Assistant District Grand Director for the District Grand Lodge of Cape Coast.

== Filmography ==
- Rhapsody Of Love (2010)
- Hot Fork (2010)
- I Sing of a Well (2009)
- Welcome Home (2004)
- Beyonce 2: The President's Daughter (2006)
- Force Marriage
