= Jot Agyeman =

Ghanaian writer, actor and media practitioner

John Osei Tutu Agyeman
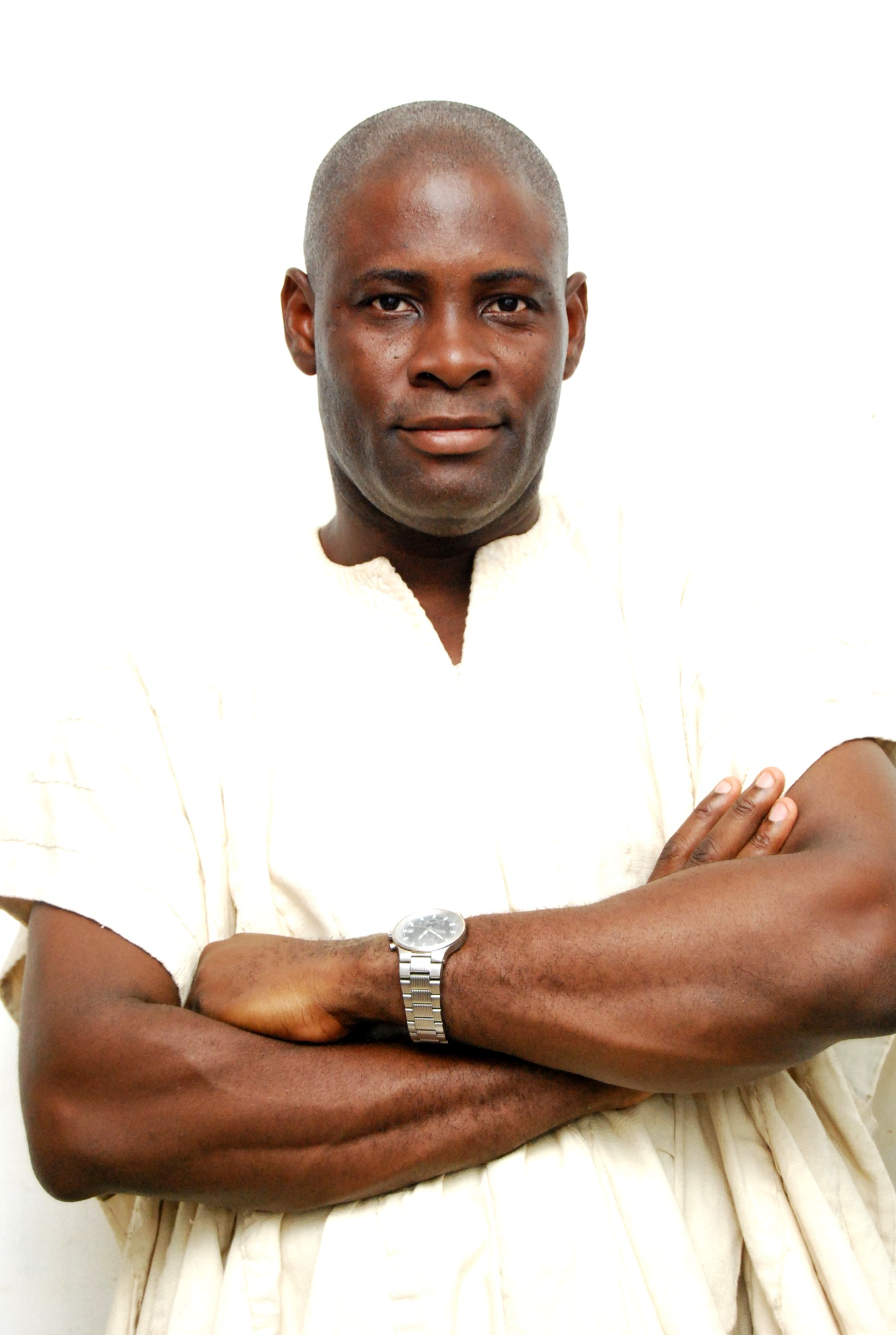
- Born: 28 June 1967 (age 59); Kumasi, Ghana
- Citizenship: Ghanaian
- Education: University of Ghana
- Occupations: Actor; Playwright; Media executive
- Years active: 1987–date

John Osei Tutu Agyeman (born 28 June 1967 in Kumasi) also known by the name Jot Agyeman is a Ghanaian author, actor, playwright and television personality.

== Early life and education ==
Agyeman was born on 28 June 1967 in Kumasi. He is the youngest of his mother's ten children, and his father's sixteenth child. His father was enstooled Nkosuo Nkosuohene (Development Chief) by the Late Asantehene (Ashanti King) Otumfuo Opoku Ware II, making him (his father) the first-ever Nkosuohene to be installed in Ghana.

Agyeman had his secondary education at Prempeh College, Kumasi. He later continued at Wesley College, Kumasi, where he trained as a teacher. He then enrolled at the University of Ghana to pursue a programme in Theater Arts at both undergraduate and graduate levels. His speciality was play writing with a focus on the history of the Ashanti Kingdom and its culture.

== Career ==
=== Writing ===
As a writer, Agyeman served as the Director of publishing with Eagle Media House, London, UK, he a considerable part of his career as an editor and book writer for the firm for many years. He wrote and edited various books, some of which include; War on Poverty and The Concept of Love in Relationships. He is also the author of;

- I Have the Power, Destiny Books (2003);
- The Concept of Love in Relationships, Temple Publishing (2003).

=== Film ===
As an actor Agyeman has starred in many movies. Some of which include; Fools in Love by Akofa Edjeani Asiedu, The Blinkards by Professor Martin Owusu, Double by KSM, I Sing of a Well by Leila Djansi and Rain by Nabil Maizongo. In 2013, he was tasked to write two biopics on two of the best known heroes in Africa. He is wrote a third biopic on the life of Osagyefo Dr. Kwame Nkrumah, Ghana's first President.

=== Media ===
Agyeman's media career began in the 1990s on GTV, when he appeared as a guest presenter on the channel's breakfast show. After a year with GTV, he left for the United Kingdom for further training and returned to Ghana in 2006. He joined the GTV Newsroom that same year and was responsible for covering the African Union Summit in 2007 and the then President of Ghana, John Kufuor's State visit to the United Kingdom. Agyeman later moved to TV3 upon invitation of Mr. Robert Kofi Nyantakyi, one he considers a mentor, to co-host the television network's breakfast show Start, with Matilda Haynes and Ronald Walker. While at TV3, he was also the host of the political chat programme, Hot Issues, and a judge of the reality show, Hottest Host.

In January 2010 Agyeman joined e.TV Ghana as a television executive. He was made Programmes Manager and tasked with the responsibility of putting together programmes that will help the television network attain good ratings. Programmes that were rolled out during his tenure include, Exposure and e Business Journal, Breakfast TV, Awake, 100 Degrees, News Xtra, Week in Focus, The Late Nite Celebrity Show, and Girl Talk and Big Screen. He became the general manager of e.TV Ghana in September 2010. He served in this capacity until 31 October 2012.

Agyeman played an active role in the formation of the Institute for Media Practice in Ghana. The institute is a research-oriented facility that focuses on training media personnel, surveying, monitoring and evaluating media in West African. He returned to e.TV Ghana in November 2014 as Managing Consultant.

=== Other engagements ===
Agyeman is a media consultant who currently presides over the Institute for Media Practice Ghana. He founded Solaris Films in 2011, the film company was founded to produce African documentaries and biographies. He was the Show Director for the Miss Ghana pageant in 2012, and serves as a Resident Judge for the 4Syte TV Music Video Awards. He is a member of the Ghana Fashion Awards board and also serves as a judge on Miss Tourism Ghana. He Founded the Media and Broadcasting Awards, an award scheme instituted in 2013 to encourage Ghanaian media practitioners to follow to good media practices.

== Personal life ==
Agyeman considers Mr. Nyantakyi and Mr. Kofi Bucknor as the two people who influenced his early career. He loves to train and develop the youth. In 2019, he announced his intentions to contest for the Ayawaso Central seat on the ticket of the New Patriotic Party.

== Honours ==
In 1987 Agyeman won the best Actor award for the role he played in Professor Martin Owusu's The Story Ananse Told. He was also the first student to receive the Patrons’ Award for Excellence at the School of Performing Arts, University of Ghana. He also wrote the short film; Not my Daughter which won the Africa Movie Academy Award for Short Film. Agyeman gained nomination from the Africa Movie Academy Awards in 2009, and the Ghana Movie Awards in 2010. In June 2011 he was awarded best Television Programme Director in Ghana at the 2011 edition of the Radio and Television Personality Awards.
