= Soul Diaspora =

- Where is home?
- Directed by: Odera Ozoka
- Written by: Odera Ozoka
- Produced by: Clotilde Delavennat, Odera Ozoka, James Peterson, Jonathan S. Abrams, Uju Uchendu
- Starring: Sadiq Abu; Kristian Steel; Mimi Vasser; Brendan Jackson; Maggie Maki; Serge Eustache; Donald Ajluni
- Cinematography: Edwin Kim
- Edited by: Richard Schachter
- Release date: 2009
- Country: United States
- Language: English/Fulani
- Budget: US$20,000

Soul Diaspora is a 2009 film written and directed by Odera Ozoka. The film received three nominations at the 6th Africa Movie Academy Awards in 2010 for Best Actor in a Leading Role, Best film by an African Filmmaker in Diaspora, and AMAA Achievement in Sound, winning the award for Best film by an African Filmmaker in Diaspora. In addition, the film won the Audience Favorite Award at the 2010 Pan African Film Festival in Los Angeles, United States.

== Plot ==
The story depicts Saidu (Sadiq Abu), a Nigerian immigrant living in Los Angeles who is forced to overcome sleepless nights of his tormented past in Africa. The audience finds him alone in this modern world, often hearing voices in his head, sometimes not even his, as the film interweaves color and black and white to illustrate this protagonist's conflicted behavior and tortured mental state.

Saidu's "life's path" brings him to working less than minimum wage at a mechanic shop, forging little by little a friendship with a sixteen-year-old Afghani-American, Reza (Kristian Steel), the son of the shop's friendly owner. Yet, even then, the mysterious Saidu is unable to fully overcome his alienation and loneliness. He soon meets and bonds with a stripper, Latisha (Mimi Vasser), after frequenting the same bar.

During the film, the audience meets an African-American named Tyrone (Serge Eustache) who may not share Saidu's morality, but is confronted with internal troubles. He is embroiled in a seamy love triangle with Saidu's encounter, Latisha and another woman, Lori (Maggie Maki), whom he has no feelings for but seems unable-or rather unwilling to rid himself of.

All the characters' souls are stripped to the core by one searing (and national) event, which give them new perspectives.

== Cast ==
- Sadiq Abu as Saidu
- Kristian Steel as Reza
- Lucan Rois as Seth
- Mimi Vasser as Latisha
- Dave Vescio as Zach
- Clotilde Delavennat as Amber
- Brendan Jackson as Dirty Mouth
- Lou Houchin as Matt
- Maggie Maki as Lori
- Serge Eustache as Tyrone
- Donald Ajluni as Ziman
- Sarah Holden as Carmen
