= Content House Kenya =

Kenyan media production company

- Company type: Production company
- Industry: television, film, photography
- Genre: Documentary, comedy, drama, TV commercials, photography
- Founded: 2011
- Headquarters: Nairobi, Kenya
- Key people: Jackie Lebo; Roy Gachuhi; Billie Odidi; John Kagagi
- Website: https://www.contenthousekenya.org/

Content House Kenya (also Content House, and Content House Education Trust) is a film, television, and commercials production company which is based in Nairobi, Kenya. It is a collective of filmmakers, writers, and photographers seeking to create and distribute content on topics that are underrepresented in the mainstream media but are still of great importance to the public. Their documentary Gun to Tape was nominated for Best Documentary at the 9th Africa Movie Academy Awards. Their feature documentary The Last Fight was selected for the 2016 Africa International Film Festival and the 2016 edition of the Luxor African Film Festival.

== Productions ==
- Turkana Sessions (2022) visual album for the world music band Turkana Sessions
- Floating, Flying (2019) The Artists' Xchange photography series
- Ivory Belongs to Elephants (2019) short documentary for Giving Nature a Voice
- The Flyest Wedding in Africa (2018) The Artists' Xchange photography series
- The Artists Xchange (2018 - present) ongoing art and music project
- Stories from Turkana (2015) short documentary series in partnership with Cordaid
- The Last Fight (2015) a feature-length documentary film
- Kenya Navy at 50 (2014) a short documentary film
- Kenya's Olympic Journey (2012) a photo exhibition
- Gun to Tape (2012) a short documentary film
