= Jail (2018 film) =

2018 Nigerian film by Morris K. Sesay

- Directed by: Morris K. Sesay
- Written by: Eyo Emmanuel
- Produced by: Morris K. Sesay
- Starring: Bimbo Akintola; Salami Rotimi; Chelsea Eze; Ngozi Nwosu
- Production company: Iroko TV studios
- Release date: 2018
- Running time: 98 minutes
- Country: Nigeria
- Language: English

Jail is a 2018 Nigerian film directed and produced by Morris K. Sesay.

== Plot ==
The film tells a story of man who has been jailed for a crime he did not commit, while the perpetrator of the crime who is his friend runs away.

== Cast ==
- Bimbo Akintola as Folarin's Mother
- Rotimi Salami as Folarin
- Chelsea Eze as Tega
- Ronke Odusanya as Ada
- Allwell Ademola as Agatha
- Ngozi Nwosu as Mama Amaka
- Morris Sesay as Tunde
- Jamiu A. Aminu as Frenco
- Ayoola Benedict as TeeBoy
- Edet Cobham as Linus
- Misturah Ewepe as Maria
- Ronke Akinsuroju as Ugonma
- Muna John as Sandra
- Kazeem Luciano as Musa
- Amaka Obi-Emelonye as Cynthia
- Akomolafe Tiwalade as Amaka
