= The Be Bold Show =

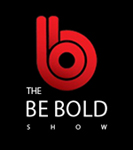
- Genre: Talk show
- Created by: Christal Beeko
- Written by: Afua Rida and Victor Toboh
- Directed by: Mabanga Chisenga and Reginald Adjei
- Presented by: Christal Jeane and Sterre Mkatini
- Theme music composer: Mike Millz and Parker Valentine
- Country of origin: Ghana
- Original language: English
- No. of seasons: 5
- No. of episodes: 57

Production
- Cinematography: Multiple-camera setup
- Editors: Efua Acquaah-Harrison, Quincy Dwamena and William Kweku Asamoah
- Running time: 60 minutes

Original release
- Network: e.tv Ghana
- Release: present

The Be Bold Show (Bringing Education and Building Opportunities for Leadership and Development. Show) is a Ghanaian television talk show hosted and created by Christal Beeko and Sterre Mkatini. It was launched in 2011 and is aired on e.tv on Saturdays at 9pm with a repeat on Thursdays 1.30pm.

The show features innovative young people and celebrities contributing positively to Africa. Some popular guests and projects on the show in the past seasons were Christie Brown, Heel The World, Kwaku Sintim-Misa, Ameyaw Debrah, Trashy Bags, Honourable Hanna Tetteh.

The show is also known to facilitate the KBG BEBOLD Scholarship Fund, and by the team efforts of The Be Bold Show dedicated employees in the names Afua Rida, Reginald Adjei, Mabanga Chisenga, Efua Acquaah Harrison, Quincy Dwamena, William Kweku Asamoah and Victor Toboh, was a huge success. .
