= Rabilu Musa =

Nigerian actor and comedian

- Born: 12 December 1971; Danlasan, Kano, Nigeria
- Died: 9 December 2014 (aged 42); Kano, Nigeria
- Other names: Dan Ibro, Chairman
- Education: Government Teachers College Wudil, Kano
- Occupations: Comedian, Actor, filmmaker, director
- Years active: 1997–2014
- Children: 19

Rabilu Musa (12 December 1971 – 9 December 2014), known as Dan Ibro, was a Nigerian comedian, actor, filmmaker, and director in Kannywood film industry.

== Early life ==
Ibro attended Danlasan Primary School, located in Warawa and later moved to Government Teachers College Wudil all in his birth state. He joined the Nigerian Prison Service in 1991 and served in the civil service. Ibro quit civil service and later joined the movie industry with his first movie, Yar Mai Ganye, which promoted his career.

== Filmography ==
↓ Film	Year
'Yar Mai Ganye	ND
A Cuci Maza	2013
Akasa Atsare	2011
Allo	ND
Andamali	2013
Bita Zai Zai	ND
Borin Ibro	ND
Dan Auta Amalala	ND
Dan Gatan Ibro	ND
Dawa Dai	ND
Gabar Ibro	ND
Ibro Alkali	2012
Ibro Aloko	2007
Ibro Angon Hajiya	ND
Ibro Ba Sulhu	2014
Ibro Dan Almajiri	ND
Ibro Dan Chacha	ND
Ibro Dan Daudu	2011
Ibro Dan Fulani	ND
Ibro Dan Nageriya	ND
Ibro Dan Polio	ND
Ibro Dan Siyasa	ND
Ibro Dan Zaki	ND
Ibro Dawo-Dawo	2011
Ibro Mahaukaci	ND
Ibro Mai Babbar Riga	ND
Ibro Police	ND
Ibro Producer	2011
Ibro Saye da Sayarwa	ND
Ibro Sudan	ND
Ibro Wuju Wuju Basu	2011
Ibro Ya Auri Baturiya	2010
Kankamba	ND
Karfen Nasara	2015
Kaso	ND
Kowa Yabi	ND
Mahauta da Fulani	ND
Mai Dalilin Aure (Match Maker)	2014
Maidaben Bagi	ND
Mazan Baci	ND
Namamajo	ND
Ragon Shiri	ND
So Kasheni	ND
Sukuni	ND
Tun Ran Gini	ND
Uwar Gulma (The Mother of Gossip)	2015

== Awards ==
Year	Award	Category	Film	Result
2014	2014 Nigeria Entertainment Awards	Best Supporting Actor	Special Recognition	Nominated
2015	2nd Kannywood/MTN Awards	Best Comedian (Jurors Choice Awards)	Posthumous Award	Won
