= Silent Scandals =

- Theatrical poster
- Directed by: T.K. Falope
- Written by: Vivian Ejike
- Produced by: Vivian Ejike
- Starring: Genevieve Nnaji; Majid Michel; Chelsea Eze
- Cinematography: Alfred Chai
- Edited by: Okey Benson
- Music by: Austin Erowele; Paul Play Dairo; Audio Network
- Production company: Purple Pine Productions
- Distributed by: Nollywood Distributions
- Release dates: December 4, 2009 (Ghana); December 6, 2009 (Nigeria)
- Running time: 139 minutes (theatrical & VCD); 164 minutes (extended DVD)
- Country: Nigeria
- Language: English

Silent Scandals is a 2009 Nigerian romantic drama film written and produced by Vivian Ejike and directed by T.K. Falope, It stars Genevieve Nnaji, Majid Michel, Chelsea Eze, Uche Jombo and Ebele Okaro-Onyiuke. Chelsea Eze won the Most Promising Actress category for her role in the film at the 6th Africa Movie Academy Awards.

== Cast ==
- Genevieve Nnaji as Jessie
- Majid Michel as Neto
- Chelsea Eze as Ella
- Uche Jombo as Muky
- Ebele Okaro-Onyiuke as Mrs Helen Ubaka
- Ime Bishop Umoh as Akpan
- Pope Stan U. Ndu as Jay Jay
- Isaac David as Alhaji Danladi
- Peachman Akputa as Etim
- Dami Solomon as Tonia
- Tessy Oragwa as Tina
- Oladimeji Alimi as Alhaji Aide
- Kelechi Amadi Obi as Photographer
