= Lawan Ahmad =

Nigerian actor, filmmaker and producer

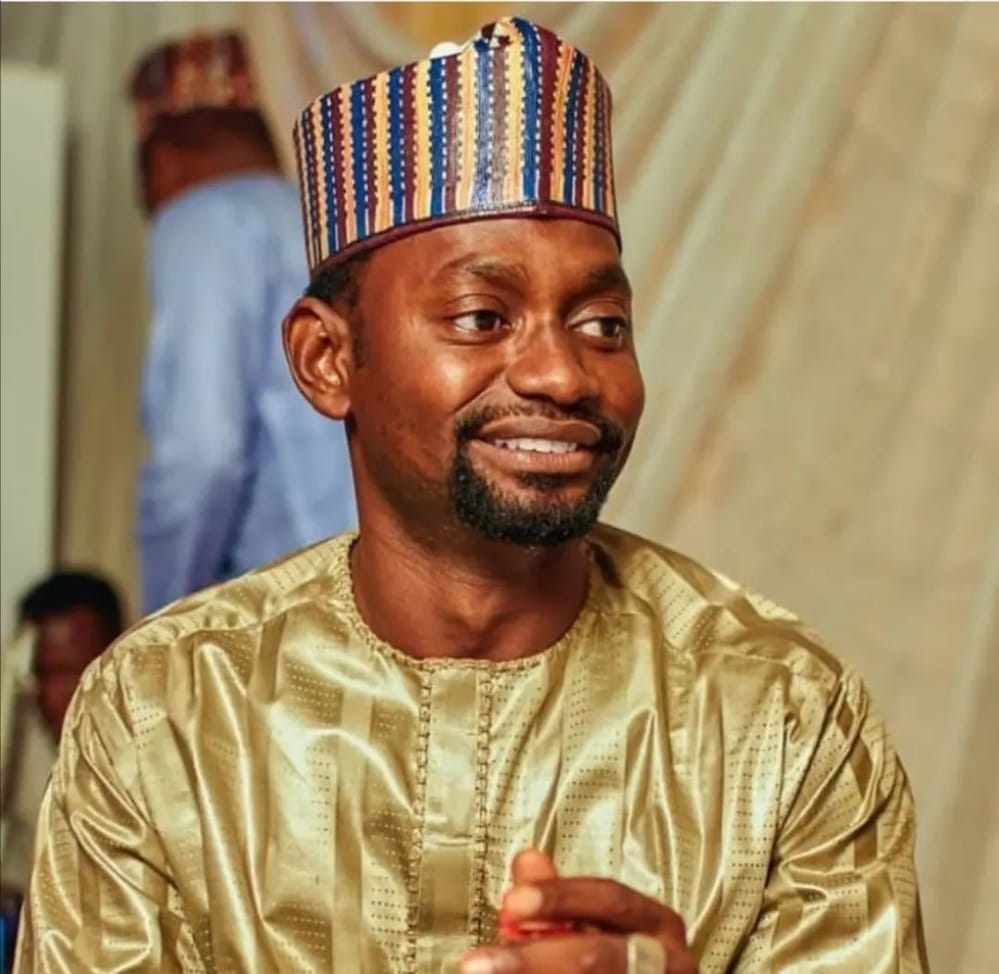
- Born: 13 March 1982 (age 44); Bakori, Katsina State
- Education: Yusuf Maitama Sule University, Kano
- Occupations: actor, filmmaker and producer.

Lawan Ahmad is a Nigerian actor, filmmaker and producer. He is a product of "FKD Film Production", he came into a limelight through the contribution of Ahmed S Nuhu.

== Biography ==
Lawan Yahaya Ahmad was born in Bakori local government area of Katsina state on 13 March 1982. He attended primary school at Nadabo Primary school Bakori, from 1987 to 1993. He proceeded Government Day Secondary School, Bakori, for his junior secondary school education, and he obtained his Senior Secondary Certificate Examination (SSCE) at Government Day Secondary School, Sharada, from 1994 to 2000.

He pursued his tertiary education at Federal College Of Education, Kano, from 2002 to 2004. He also attended Yusif Maitama Sule University Kano, from 2016 to 2017.

The actor enrolled into the Kannywood Film Industry in the year (1999) and he started appearing in a movie [SIRADI] which happened to be his first Movie.

== Selected filmography ==
1. Izzar So
2. Zuma
3. Sharhi
4. Bakace
5. Kolo
6. Taraliya
7. Sansani
8. Sai wata rana
9. Wasila 2010
10. Haske
11. Kalamu wahid
12. Siradi
13. Maya
14. Muradin Kaina
15. Ni da kai da shi
16. Shanya
17. Bani ba ke
18. Abun da kayi
19. Hauwa kulu
20. mazaje 2
21. bazan barkiba
22. sabon sarki
23. kolo
24. saiwata rana 2010
25. ya salam
26. ranar haduwa
27. saimai mota
28. noir (the light)
29. naso kaina
30. jani jani
31. nida kai dashi
