= Yaki a Soyayya =

- Directed by: Alfazazi Muhammad
- Written by: Nafisat Abdullahi; Abdul M. Shareef
- Starring: Nafisat Abdullahi; Abdul M. Shareef; Falalu A. Dorayi; Bilkisu Abdullahi
- Release date: 28 December 2018
- Country: Nigeria
- Language: Hausa

Yaki a Soyayya is a 2018 thriller drama film from the Kannywood film industry. It was co-written by Nafisat Abdullahi and Abdul M. Shareef, and directed by Alfazazi Muhammad. Yaki a Soyayya tells a story of social vices among youths in the society.

== Plot ==
The plot of the film centers around the life of a young woman highlighting her struggles with drug abuse. The film also shines a light on domestic violence and crimes in the society and how they can be tackled.

== Cast ==
- Nafisa Abdullahi
- Abdul M Shareef
- Falalu Dorayi
- Bilkisu Abdullahi.

== Recognition ==
- Top 20 films in Nigerian Cinemas from 28 December 2018 to 3 January 2019.
