= Izzar So =

- Directed by: Lawan Ahmad
- Starring: Lawan Ahmad, Ali Nuhu, Aisha Najamu, Minal Ahmad, Ali Dawayya
- Country of origin: Nigeria
- Original language: Hausa

Original release
- Release: 2019 – 2022

Izzar So (English: The Struggle of love) is a Nigerian Hausa-language cinema series created by Bakori TV and directed by Lawan Ahmad. It stars Lawan Ahmad, Ali Nuhu, Aisha Najamu, Minal Ahmad, and Ali Dawayya as the main cast. The series follows the lives of different characters who face various challenges and struggles in their personal and professional lives. It is considered the most-watched Hausa series currently, with over 1.9 million views on YouTube. It has also won several awards at local and international film festivals.

== Cast Member ==
- Lawan Ahmad
- Ali Nuhu
- Aisha Najamu
- Minal Ahmad
- Ali Dawayya

== Plot ==
The series revolves around the main character, Lawan (Lawan Ahmad), a young and ambitious man who wants to pursue his education and career in the city. He faces many obstacles and temptations along the way, such as corruption, crime, love, betrayal, and family issues. He also has to deal with his rivals, such as Ali (Ali Nuhu), a wealthy and influential businessman who wants to destroy Lawan's reputation and success. Lawan's love interest is Aisha (Aisha Najamu), a beautiful and intelligent woman who supports Lawan's dreams and goals. However, their relationship is complicated by the presence of Minal (Minal Ahmad), Ali's daughter who is obsessed with Lawan and tries to seduce him. Other characters include Ali Dawayya, who plays Lawan's friend and comic relief, and various supporting roles that add to the drama and suspense of the series.
