= Joyce Mhango-Chavula =

Malawain actress and director

- Born: Malawia
- Occupations: Actress, filmmaker, director and arts trainer

Joyce Mhango-Chavula is a Malawian actress, filmmaker, theatre director, and Arts trainer.

== Life ==
Joyce Mhango-Chavula started acting while at secondary school, through the Association for Teaching English in Malawi. She later joined a local drama group called Reformation Theayre and worked with the Alabama Theatre. Inspired by the example of Gertrude Kamkwatira, Chavula quit her job as a media sales and marketing supervisor in 2009, and launched her own theatre company, Rising Choreos Theatre Company. The Return (2011) brought together a Nigerian and Malawian cast, including Patience Ozokwor, and toured all three regions of Malawi.

Chavula's first feature film, No More Tears (2013), was shot in Lilongwe and on the beach of Lake Malawi in Salima District. It told the story of a 20-year-old girl who needs to take care of her father after losing her mother to AIDS. After her father dies his brothers claim his property, leaving the girl destitute.

Her 2015 film Lilongwe won Best Movie from Southern Africa in the 2016 Africa Magic Viewers' Choice Awards.

Nyasaland (2016) received a nomination for the 2018 Africa Movie Academy Awards for Best Film in an African Language. The film had its US premiere at the 2018 Silicon Valley African Film Festival.

Chavula is currently the vice president of Film Association of Malawi. She also served as vice president of the National Theatre Association of Malawi (NTAM) for three years, and is now a NTAM board member. She is an Ambassador for The African film festival (TAFF) and a member of the Oscars Malawi committee.

== Films ==
- Reflections. Actress and line producer.
- Kamara Tree. Actress and assistant production manager.
- The Last Fishing Boat. Actress and production coordinator.
- B'ella. Actress and art director.
- No More Tears, 2013. Screenwriter and director.
- Lilongwe, 2015. Director, screenwriter and actress.
- Nyasaland, 2016. Director.
- Fatsani: A Tale of Survival, 2020, Actress
