= Lilies of the Ghetto =

- Directed by: Ubaka Joseph Ugochukwu
- Screenplay by: Ubaka Joseph Ugochukwu
- Produced by: Karr Resources Entertainment
- Starring: Emmanuel Ike Prince Emeka H.B. Banu Chashow Akuette Friday Isa Haruna
- Cinematography: Fortune Ejim
- Edited by: Ubaka Joseph Ugochukwu
- Music by: Evans Steven
- Release date: 2009
- Running time: 84 minutes
- Country: Nigeria

Lilies of the Ghetto is a 2009 film.

== Synopsis ==
Ijaloko, an ex-convict and a ghetto chief, abducts five kids from his neighborhood: Johnnie, Small, Konkolo, Fryo and Bobo. He brainwashes them and induces them into using hard-drugs, thereby destroying all their humanity and turning them into a menace to society in order to achieve his wishes. Four of the kids die, one after the other. Johnnie, the luckiest of them all, survives and decides to quit being a gangster and goes back to school. Ijaloko will do everything in his power to stop him.

== Nominations ==
The film was nominated for the 6th Africa Movie Academy Awards for Most Promising Actor for Sunny Chikezie, Best Editing and Best Costume Design.
