= Dawakin Tofa Science College =

Secondary school in Kano State, Nigeria

- Nigeria, Kano

Information
- Established: 1970

Dawakin Tofa Science College is a government-run secondary school in Kano, Nigeria. The school was established in 1970s, the schools main purpose is to train students in science and to provide the state with well-qualified doctors and engineers. As of 2015 it is rated to be the best government-owned secondary school in the state of Kano.

Dawakin Tofa Science College

== Notable alumni ==
Prominent graduates of Dawakin Tofa Science College include several qualified professionals and notable figures in various fields, both nationally and internationally. Some of the prominent individuals associated with the college are:

- Ali Nuhu (Class of 1991) - An actor who has made notable contributions to both Kannywood (Hausa-language cinema industry) and Nollywood (Nigerian film industry).

== Incident ==
On 12 March, the students of Government Science College Dawakin Tofa, Dawakin Tofa Local Government started to flew and run away from the school premises because they saw some Fulani at the front of their school. This incident occurred in the night where the student were sited running away to the town.

== Challenges faced by the school due to Riot ==
On 13 August, the present governor of the state Abdulahi Ganduje pardon the indicted students that partake in the riots in the college then, also the student who wanted to write the west Africa examination WAEC was also directed to also resume then.

== Project executed ==
On 25 June 2022, the Chief of Army Staff COAS commissioned projects in the school which include class room staff room, renovated latrine, school clinic, kitchen shade, solar borehole and construction of walkways, which included the repair of school bus that need maintenance.
