= Heart of Men =

2009 film by Frank Rajah Arase

- Ghanaian release poster
- Directed by: Frank Rajah Arase
- Screenplay by: Pascal Amanfo
- Story by: Frank Rajah Arase
- Produced by: Frank Rajah Arase
- Starring: Majid Michel; John Dumelo; Prince David Osei; Yvonne Nelson; Martha Ankomah; Kofi Adjorlolo; Jackie Appiah; Nadia Buari
- Cinematography: Adam Umar
- Music by: Okyeama Qouphi
- Production companies: Heroes Films; Raj Films; Henrikesim Multimedia Concept
- Distributed by: Henrikesim Multimedia Concept
- Release date: 2009
- Countries: Ghana; Nigeria
- Language: English

Heart of Men (Reissued in Nollywood as Forbidden Fruit by Henrikesim Multimedia Concept for International distribution) is a 2009 Ghanaian Nigerian thriller film produced & directed by Frank Rajah Arase, and starring Majid Michel, John Dumelo, Prince David Osei and Yvonne Nelson. It received five nominations at the 6th Africa Movie Academy Awards.

== Cast ==
- Majid Michel as Richie
- John Dumelo as Kay
- Prince David Osei as Ray
- Yvonne Nelson as Tracy
- Martha Ankomah as Diana
- Kofi Adjorlolo as Bernard
- Gavivina Tamakloe as Officer
- Nadia Buari as Sylvia
- Luckie Lawson as Alicie
- Jackie Appiah as Whitney
- Jackie Appiah as Adline

== Reception ==
The film was generally criticized for promoting nudity in films and introducing soft porn to Nigerian and Ghanaian home videos.

It is rated 3 out of 5 stars on Nollywood Reinvented who praised the quality, setting and musical score, but found the plot too complex and the sex scenes overdone.

== See also ==
- List of Nigerian films of 2009
