= Chelsea Eze =

Nigerian actress

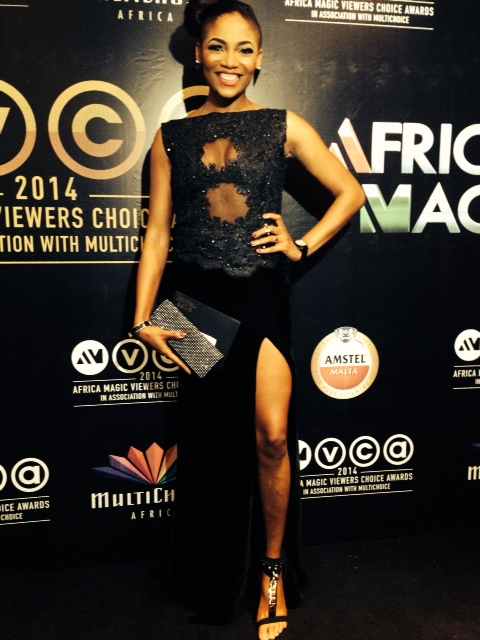
- Chelsea Eze at the 2014 Africa Magic Viewers Choice Awards
- Born: Chelsea Ada Ezerioha; November 15, 1985 (age 40); Kano State
- Citizenship: Nigeria
- Education: University of Maiduguri
- Occupation: Actress
- Years active: 2009–present
- Notable work: Silent Scandals
- Awards: 2010: Africa Movie Academy Award for Most Promising Actress

Chelsea Eze (born Chelsea Ada Ezerioha; November 15, 1985) is a Nigerian actress. She came into prominence in her first Nollywood film Silent Scandals where she acted alongside Genevieve Nnaji and Majid Michel. She also won the Most Promising Actress award for her role in the film at the 6th Africa Movie Academy Awards.

== Early life and education ==
Chelsea was born in Kano State, a state located in the northwestern region of Nigeria, though she is an Igbo descent from Umuahia, Abia State, southeast Nigeria. Her parents were both bankers. She attended Federal Government Girls College Minjibir and St. Louis Secondary School both in Kano. She studied English and linguistics at University of Maiduguri. According to an interview with The Punch she stated that "My childhood was fun because then, Kano was very peaceful and beautiful".

== Career ==
Prior to her role in Silent Scandals, she was a model and her only acting experience was in stage plays, which she did in church. She was invited by producer Vivian Ejike to audition for a supporting role in Silent Scandals, and she was chosen to appear in the film. She has featured in several other popular films like Two Brides and a Baby (2011), Hoodrush (2012) and Murder at Prime Suites (2013).

== Personal life ==
Chelsea grew up as an introvert but learnt how to express herself during her secondary school days. She is in a serious relationship. Her nickname is Poukka.

== Filmography ==
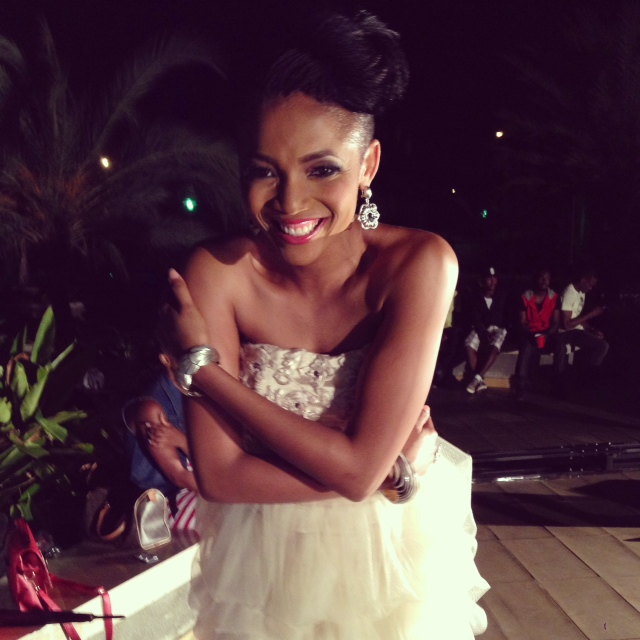
Chelsea Eze

Year	Film	Role	Notes
2009	Silent Scandals	Ella	with Genevieve Nnaji
2011	Two Brides and a Baby	Ugo	With OC Ukeje, Kalu Ikeagwu and Stella Damasus
2011	Twist		
2011	Timeless Passion	Ruky	
2012	Hoodrush	Shakira	with Bimbo Akintola, OC Ukeje & Gabriel Afolayan
2012	Closed Door		
2012	Laugh won kill me die		
2012	The Kingdom	Princess Pearl	with Tana Adelana, Lilian Afegbai
2012	Tears of Passion		
2013	Murder at Prime Suites	Florence Ngwu	with Joseph Benjamin, Keira Hewatch
2014	Taste of Love	Eve Ikpeba	
2015	Ikogosi	Emem	with IK Ogbonna
2016	Tamed	Celia	with Tana Adelana
2017	Jail	Tega	with Bimbo Akintola
2018	White Wash	Lola	with Jennifer Adams
2019	Inheritance	Ezinne	Directed by Chris Eneaji Eneng
2020	Separated	Princess	Directed by Tope Alake
2020	Stillborn	Juanta	
2020	Long Walk To Truth	Whitney	
2020	A story from Zazu		
2020	Disentangled	ND	
2021	A Dose of Her Pill	Susan	
2021	Bolaji	Big Bolaji	
2021	Unforeseen	Princess Ijeoma	
2021	My Sister's Husband	Amara	
2021	Rebellion		
2021	Marrying a Campbell	Deinabo Campbell	
2022	A Sweet Stench	Ella	
2022	The Best Thing	Alero	
2022	Fighting Fate	Nadia	
2022	Obiye The Comforter	Obiye	
2022	Kith &Kin	Chidera	
2022	Just a Number	Alice	
2023	Sammie & Gina		

== Accolades ==
Year	Award	Category	Film	Result
2010	Africa Movie Academy Awards	Most Promising Talent	Silent Scandals	Won
2010	Best of Nollywood Awards	Most Promising Talent	Silent Scandals	Nominated
2010	Best of Nollywood Awards	Revelation of the Year	Silent Scandals	Won
2010	ZAFAA Awards	Best Upcoming Actress	Silent Scandals	Won
2011	Best of Nollywood Awards	Best Actress in a Supporting Role (English)	Two Brides and a Baby	Nominated
2013	Nollywood Movies Awards	Best Actress in a Supporting role	Hoodrush	Nominated

== See also ==
- List of Nigerian actors
