= The Abyss Boys =

- Directed by: Jan-Hendrik Beetge
- Screenplay by: Jan-Hendrik Beetge
- Produced by: Tendeka Matatu & Rachel Young
- Starring: Travis Snyders Moegammed Ja’qoop Isaacs Brandon Daniels Lionel Newton Anton Treurnich
- Cinematography: Greg Heimann
- Edited by: Eben Smal
- Music by: Hans Raubenheimer
- Production company: Ten 10 Films
- Release date: 2009
- Running time: 26 minutes
- Country: South Africa

The Abyss Boys is a 2009 South African short film directed by Jan-Hendrik Beetge. It won the Best Short Film award at the 6th Africa Movie Academy Awards.

== Synopsis ==
Set in the slums of a small fishing community on the southern coast of South Africa, illegal abalone poaching has become a dangerous activity for two young brothers: Jimmy and AB. Jimmy fled the dangerous lifestyle despite his talent as a diver. When AB becomes entangled with Gonyama, a violent gangster, Jimmy devises a plan to liberate AB from the gang lifestyle and provide the pair with a fresh start. However, when Jimmy is given an opportunity to escape, nothing can prepare him for what comes next.

== Awards ==
- Africa Movie Academy Awards 2010
