= Hoodrush =

2012 Nigerian musical thriller film

- Theatrical poster
- Directed by: Dimeji Ajibola
- Screenplay by: Dimeji Ajibola
- Produced by: Dimeji Ajibola
- Starring: OC Ukeje; Bimbo Akintola; Gabriel Afolayan; Chelsea Eze
- Cinematography: Gbenga Afolabi
- Music by: Patrick Mathias
- Production company: Flipsyde Studio
- Release date: October 12, 2012
- Running time: 146 minutes
- Country: Nigeria
- Language: English

Hoodrush is a 2012 Nigerian musical thriller film written, produced, and directed by Dimeji Ajibola, and starring OC Ukeje, Bimbo Akintola, and Gabriel Afolayan. It received two nominations at the 9th Africa Movie Academy Awards, Gabriel Afolayan eventually won the award for the category Best Actor In A Supporting Role.

The film tells a story of two brothers who face various challenges as they strive to participate in musical talent shows.

== Cast ==
- OC Ukeje as Shez Jabari
- Bimbo Akintola as Alhaja Khadijah
- Gabriel Afolayan as Tavier Jabari
- Chelsea Eze as Shakira
- Ijeoma Grace Agu as Kelechi
- Stan Nze as Mech Boy

== Reception ==
=== Critical reception ===
The film received mostly positive to average reviews. Nollywood Reinvented praised the film for its beautiful and well composed music and gave it a 69% rating, stating "the speedometer of the movie at the beginning may have been average, but it grew to a crescendo like an interesting novel one had doubts about, but became happy he read it to the end. This is a good movie". Sodas and Popcorn on the other hand believed the film would've been better with less songs. It gave a 4 out of 5 rating and wrote "This was a very beautiful script filled with lots of suspense, intrigue, emotion and a little bit of good ol’ action and my least favourite, the singing. The flashbacks were beautiful, the sex scenes were top notch, the fight scenes were actually believable, even better than some Hollywood struggle scenes".

== Awards ==
Hoodrush received two nominations at the 9th Africa Movie Academy Awards including the category Achievement in Soundtrack. It also received eleven nominations at the 2013 Nollywood Movies Awards including the category Best Movie.

=== Africa Movie Academy Awards ===
- AMAA 2013 Prize For Best Actor In A Supporting Role (won)
- AMAA 2013 Prize For Achievement In Soundtrack (nominated)

=== Nollywood Movies Awards ===
- Best Movie
- Best Lead Actor (won)
- Best Lead Actress
- Best Supporting Actor
- Best Supporting Actress
- Best Director
- Best Editing
- Best Sound Design
- Best Original Screenplay
- Best Soundtrack (won)
- Best Rising Star (male)
- Best Rising Star (female)

== See also ==
- List of Nigerian films of 2012
