= Confusion Na Wa =

2013 film by Kenneth Gyang

- Theatrical poster
- Directed by: Kenneth Gyang
- Written by: Kenneth Gyang; Tom Rowlands-Rees
- Produced by: Kenneth Gyang; Tom Rowlands-Rees
- Starring: Ramsey Nouah; OC Ukeje; Ali Nuhu
- Cinematography: Yinka Edward
- Production company: Cinema KpataKpata
- Release date: August 1, 2013 (AFRIFF)
- Running time: 105 minutes
- Country: Nigeria
- Language: English

Confusion Na Wa is a 2013 Nigerian dark comedy drama film directed by Kenneth Gyang, starring Ramsey Nouah, OC Ukeje, Ali Nuhu and Tunde Aladese. The title of the film was inspired by the lyrics of the late Afrobeat singer Fela Kuti's song "Confusion". Confusion Na Wa won the Best picture at the 9th Africa Movie Academy Awards, it also won the award for Best Nigerian film. The film tells a story on how so many interconnected separate events come together to complicate the lives of people.

== Plot ==
The film starts with a monologue by an unnamed narrator explaining the synopsis of the film with images from the end of the film. Emeka Nwosu (Ramsey Nouah) is stuck in a traffic jam caused by the death of a pedestrian, when his concubine, Isabella (Tunde Aladese), sends him a text reminding him to get home early so they can have fun. City hustlers Charles (OC Ukeje) and Chichi (Gold Ikponmwosa) arrive at the scene, and as a fight breaks out on the crowded road Emeka is knocked down and his phone falls out of his pocket, and after Emeka walks away oblivious, Charles steals it. Bello (Ali Nuhu) is a diligent and honest civil servant, whose only "crime" at the office has been his refusal to partake in any of the corrupt practice by his co-workers. His raucous boss uses every opportunity to disrespect him. During a workday, Bello is given more jobs to do by his colleagues after work hours. He reluctantly accepts and is subsequently abused by his boss for not finishing the job on time despite his explanations.

Charles and Chichi review the pictures on the stolen phone and try to reach an agreement on what to do with the phone. The two friends force their entry to the car of a publisher by breaking the wheel-screen, and steal the stereo. They buy some drinks with the money they got and begin discussing on their interpretation of The Lion King as seen by Africans. Emeka notices that his phone has been stolen and tries calling his number, but is told by Charlie that due to "The Circle of Life" in The Lion King ownership has been passed on to them from him. He furiously disengages from the conversation on the resistance of the friends to start a meaningful conversation. He is calmed by his concubine Isabella afterwards.

Babajide (Tony Goodman) is the head publisher of Righteous Trumpet Newspaper. During a family dinner he explains the car robbery he faced and is surprised that both his wife and kids did not condemn the act by the thieves with complete disdain—instead, a sociological debate starts between him and his son, Kola (Nathaniel Deme) who is shifting the blame from the thieves to the government. His mum introduces another topic to end the heated debate since neither side will let go.

Charles persuades Chichi to accompany him to a drug dealer, Muri (Toyin Oshinaike). Charles had previously had sex with Muri's sister, but Chichi is negligent and wants to visit another dealer at "Abbatoir". He later retires then follows Charles. They buy drugs worth N200, and as Muri's sister walks outside and Muri notices Chichi facial expressions towards her, Muri tells them that his sister is about to get married. Charles and Chichi have a reflective discussion while having a cigar when Chichi informs Charles that he will be relocating to Bauchi State to start a new life with his uncle. Charles gives him the stolen phone as a farewell gift.

The two friends interrupt the sexual intercourse between a disturbed Emeka and Isabella with a call, and they start to negotiate a ransom for the recovery of the phone, while Emeka's wife waits for him at home. Kola's sister, Doyin (Yachat Sankey) sneaks out of the house to attend a party and persuades Kola to promise not to tell their parents. At the party, Charles drugs Doyin's friend, Fola (Lisa Pam-Tok) then the power goes out and he rapes her. Chichi refuses to use drugs on Doyin and opts to get her number instead. Police raid the party and arrest many including Charles. At home, Babajide tries motivating Kola with some fatherly advise and explains to him that he needs to start taking responsibility to become a man. He instructs Kola to join him at his office the next day.

At home we see that Bello's wife is Isabella, and he questions his wife on her whereabouts the previous day. She feels irritated in the course of their argument, especially at his mention of lack of money as the reason for them not wanting to have a child. On his way to work the next day, Babajide and Kola engage in a father-son conversation, and Babajide narrates his life-story on how he was able to overcome challenges during the civil war and establish his company. He gets distracted then splashes muddy water on Bello, who is walking along the road. Bello reacts angrily by throwing a stone at the car and regrettably breaking the back-screen. Babjide refuses to accept any compensation or apology from him and decides to take him to the Police Station explaining to him that as a good example to his son, whenever crimes are committed, it should always be a matter for the police. As he zooms off with Bello in his car, the sticker on his car reads "I am an Ideal Citizen, what about you?". Bello refuses to bribe his way out of jail at the request of the corrupt policemen and is placed in the same cell as Charles. Babajide introduces Kola to his staff at the office and tells him to write an article on the decline of the moral level in the society, using his ordeal (with the thieves and Bello) as a guide, even though he had previously told him to write on the power supply.

After some hours, the police release Bello, having encountered difficulty in extorting money from either him or Babajide; however they refuse to help him find his wallet, which is later revealed to have been stolen by Charles in the cell. Afterwards he is set free after his Parole Officer warns him that he will not be given a second chance if he breaks the law again. He sets out to his father's house, where the nagging of his mum about his way of life drove him out. Charles and Chichi meets on a hill, where they discuss the previous night and their encounter with the ladies. They call Emeka and threaten to blackmail him by telling his wife of his extra-marital affairs, if he does not yield to their demands. Doyin informs Kola that her friend is missing, and he should come to her rescue. Kola leaves his dad's office to assist her in finding Fola. After searching for some time, they find Fola by the road then take her home to an apprehensive dad, Adekunle (Toyin Alabi) who swore to kill whoever was responsible for the rape. Isabella informs Emeka that she is pregnant, and he refuses the pregnancy and advises her to return to her husband. Babajide consults many of his colleagues to examine if his suspicion that Kola is gay is true. Bello angrily abandons his work after getting fed-up with the kind of treatment he has been subjected to by his boss and colleagues. Adekunle gets the address of Emeka through his phone number (from Chichi). He consults Bello's office and pays his way to get the personal details of the owner of the phone.

Emeka narrates his phone theft story to his wife, Irene (Yewande Iruemiobe) and she discourages him from paying the ransom. On his way out to meet Charles and Chichi, he is stopped by Adekunle, who slaps him severely thinking he is Chichi. After some explanations from Irene, Adekunle lets Emeka go but takes the ransom from him. Babajide questions Kola, and stylishly tries to get him to speak about his view of sexuality. Kola's responses suggest that he is unsure about what he feels about his sexual attractions, and so his dad immediately takes him to Muri in order to be cleansed of homosexuality. Bello's wife Isabella tries to impose her pregnancy on him, but he refuses citing "lack of sex" as a reason. He later sees messages that implicate Isabella on her phone.

Charles and Chichi are discussing with Muri on how they will extort money from Emeka at their meeting in Shayi's. Muri also tells them that he was paid N115,000 by Adekunle for a firearm. Kola and his dad arrive at Muri's bar explaining their ordeal to him. He responds, requesting that his "nurses" cleanse Kola of homosexuality. Bello arrives at Shayi's and suspiciously approaches a man, who he mistakenly thought was Emeka. Adekunle also arrives the scene then shoots Chichi (thinking he was Charles) who was seated with Charles close to the entrance of the restaurant.

== Cast ==
- Ramsey Nouah as Emeka Nwosu
- OC Ukeje as Charles
- Ali Nuhu as Bello
- Tunde Aladese as Isabella
- Gold Ikponmwosa as Chichi
- Tony Goodman as Babajide
- Nathaniel Deme as Kola
- Yanchat Sankey as Doyin
- Lisa Pam Tok as Fola
- Toyin Alabi as Adekunle
- Tina Attah as Mrs. Babajide
- Agatha Bamgbaiye as Charles' Mother
- Ujam Chukwunonso as Bello's Co-worker
- Yewande Iruemiobe as Irene
- Hannatu Musa Mato as Secretary

== Reception ==
The film was received with positive reviews with Sodas and Popcorn rating it 4 out of 5, describing it as one of the best movies of 2013 and an inspiration to Nigeria's filmmakers.

== Accolades ==
It won 2 awards at the 9th Africa Movie Academy Awards. It also went on to win 3 awards at the 2013 Best Of Nollywood Awards.

Complete list of Awards
Award	Category	Recipients and nominees	Result
Africa Film Academy (9th Africa Movie Academy Awards)	Best Nigerian Film	Kenneth Gyang	Won
Africa Film Academy (9th Africa Movie Academy Awards)	Best Film	Kenneth Gyang	Won
Africa Film Academy (9th Africa Movie Academy Awards)	Best Director	Kenneth Gyang	Nominated
Africa Film Academy (9th Africa Movie Academy Awards)	Best Supporting Actor	Ikponmwosa Gold	Nominated
Best of Nollywood Magazine (2013 Best of Nollywood Awards)	Movie with the Best Social Message	Kenneth Gyang	Nominated
Best of Nollywood Magazine (2013 Best of Nollywood Awards)	Best Screenplay	Kenneth Gyang	Won
Best of Nollywood Magazine (2013 Best of Nollywood Awards)	Best Edited Movie		Nominated
Best of Nollywood Magazine (2013 Best of Nollywood Awards)	Best Production Design		Won
Best of Nollywood Magazine (2013 Best of Nollywood Awards)	Best Cinematography		Nominated
Best of Nollywood Magazine (2013 Best of Nollywood Awards)	Director of the Year	Kenneth Gyang	Won
Best of Nollywood Magazine (2013 Best of Nollywood Awards)	Movie of the Year	Kenneth Gyang	Won
Nigeria Entertainment Awards (2013 Nigeria Entertainment Awards)	Best Lead Actor in a Film	Ali Nuhu	Nominated
Nigeria Entertainment Awards (2013 Nigeria Entertainment Awards)	Best Supporting Actor in a Film	OC Ukeje	Nominated
Nigeria Entertainment Awards (2013 Nigeria Entertainment Awards)	Best Supporting Actress in a Film	Tunde Aladese	Won
Nigeria Entertainment Awards (2013 Nigeria Entertainment Awards)	Best Film Director	Kenneth Gyang	Nominated
Nigeria Entertainment Awards (2013 Nigeria Entertainment Awards)	Best Picture	Kenneth Gyang	Nominated

== See also ==
- List of Nigerian films of 2013
