= Florence Masebe =

South African actress

- Born: South Africa
- Occupation: Actress
- Known for: Muvhango
- Awards: 9th Africa Movie Academy Awards

Raesibe Florence Masebe is a South African actress, known locally for her role in the series Muvhango. She was born and raised in the province of Limpopo, South Africa.

She won Africa Movie Academy Award for Best Actress in a Leading Role at the 9th Africa Movie Academy Awards.

== Filmography ==
- Morwalela (2010–2020 TV Series) as Beauty
- The Republic (2019 TV Series) as Lufuno
- Black Butterflies (2011) as Maria
- Task Force (2014 TV Series) as Lindiwe
- Soul City (1994)
- Elelwani (2012) as Elelwani
- Ring Of Lies (2016 TV Series) as Masindi
