= List of Nigerian film stars =

List of Nigerian film stars is a list of actors, actresses, filmmakers, and entertainers related to Nigerian film industry, commonly known as Nollywood since the 1990s.

== Nollywood actors and actresses ==
=== A ===
- Ali Nuhu
- Alexx Ekubo
- Adebayo Salami
- Adesua Etomi

=== C ===
- Chinedu Ikedieze
- Chioma Chukwuka

=== D ===
- Desmond Elliot
- Deyemi Okanlawon

=== E ===
- Eucharia Anunobi

=== F ===
- Funke Akindele

=== G ===
- Genevieve Nnaji

=== I ===
- Ini Edo

=== J ===
- Jim Iyke
- Joke Silva

=== K ===
- Kanayo O. Kanayo
- Kate Henshaw
- Kenneth Okonkwo
- Kunle Afolayan

=== M ===
- Mercy Johnson
- Mike Ezuruonye

=== N ===
- Nkem Owoh
- Ngozi Ezeonu
- Nonso Diobi
- Nosa Rex

=== O ===
- Odunlade Adekola
- Omotola Jalade Ekeinde
- Osita Iheme
- Olu Jacobs

=== P ===
- Patience Ozokwor
- Pete Edochie

=== R ===
- Ramsey Nouah
- Richard Mofe-Damijo
- Rita Dominic

=== S ===
- Segun Arinze
- Stephanie Okereke Linus

=== Y ===
- Yul Edochie

=== Z ===
- Zack Orji
- Zubby Michael

== See also ==
- Nollywood
- Nigeria
- List of Nigerian films
- Cinema of Africa
