= Reloaded (2009 film) =

2009 film by Lancelot Oduwa Imasuen

- Directed by: Lancelot Oduwa Imasuen; Ikechukwu Onyeka
- Screenplay by: Emem Isong; Bola Aduwo; Nse Ikpe Etim
- Story by: Emem Isong
- Produced by: Emem Isong
- Starring: Ramsey Nouah; Rita Dominic; Desmond Elliot; Stephanie Okereke; Ini Edo; Nse Ikpe Etim; Enyinna Nwigwe
- Release date: 2009
- Country: Nigeria
- Language: English

Reloaded is a 2009 Nigerian romantic drama film directed by Lancelot Oduwa Imasuen & Ikechukwu Onyeka, starring Ramsey Nouah, Rita Dominic, Desmond Elliot, Stephanie Okereke, Ini Edo and Nse Ikpe Etim. It received 3 nominations at the 5th Africa Movie Academy Awards.

== Cast ==
- Ramsey Nouah as Femi
- Desmond Elliot as Osita
- Rita Dominic as Chelsea
- Stephanie Okereke as Weyinmi
- Ini Edo as Tayo
- Van Vicker as Bube
- Uche Jombo as Tracy
- Nse Ikpe Etim as Omoze
- Monalisa Chinda as Abbey
- Enyinna Nwigwe as Edwin
- Mbong Amata (née Odungide) as Nira
- Temisan Isioma Etsede as Otis
- Emeka Duru as Gabriel
- Princess Anazodo as Bube's Mum
- Ahmed Aitity as Shola
- Martha Iwoo as Ifeyinwa
- Ikechukwu Onyeka as Doctor

== Reception ==
Nollywood Reinvented gave it a rating of 3 out of 5 stars. The reviewer remarked that although he has seen the film several times, he never gets tired of it. NollywoodForever gave it a 93% rating. The reviewer praised the movie's pacing and flow, and enjoyed the dance scene at the end.

== See also ==
- List of Nigerian films of 2009
