= Elelwani =

2012 film

- Film poster
- Directed by: Ntshavheni wa Luruli
- Written by: Ntshavheni wa Luruli
- Starring: Florence Masebe
- Music by: Chris Letcher
- Release date: 19 July 2012
- Running time: 103 minutes
- Country: South Africa
- Language: Venda

Elelwani is a 2012 South African drama film directed by Ntshavheni wa Luruli. It won awards for Achievement in Production Design and Best Actress in a Leading Role for Masebe at the 9th Africa Movie Academy Awards. It was selected as the South African entry for the Best Foreign Language Film at the 87th Academy Awards, but was not nominated.

== Cast ==
- Florence Masebe as Elelwani
- Vusi Kunene as King Thovhele
- Ashifashabba Muleya as Vele
- Sammy Moeti as Madzwara
- Samson Ramabulana as Father
- Salome Mutshinya as Mother
- Prudence Msipha as Rendani
- Elsie Rasalanavho as Makhadzi
- Mutodi Neshehe as King Ratshihule

== See also ==
- List of submissions to the 87th Academy Awards for Best Foreign Language Film
- List of South African submissions for the Academy Award for Best Foreign Language Film
