= Guilty Pleasures (2009 film) =

2009 film by Desmond Elliot

- Film poster design
- Directed by: Daniel Ademinokan; Desmond Elliot
- Screenplay by: Uyai Ikpe Etim; Bola Aduwo
- Produced by: Desmond Elliot; Emem Isong
- Starring: Ramsey Nouah; Majid Michel; Nse Ikpe Etim; Mercy Johnson; Omoni Oboli; Desmond Elliot
- Cinematography: Austine Nwaolie
- Edited by: Uche Alex Moore
- Production company: Royal Arts Academy
- Release date: 29 November 2009
- Country: Nigeria
- Language: English

Guilty Pleasures is a 2009 Nigerian drama film directed by Desmond Elliot and Daniel Ademinokan, starring Ramsey Nouah, Majid Michel and Nse Ikpe Etim. It was nominated for Best Screenplay at the 6th Africa Movie Academy Awards.

== Cast ==
- Ramsey Nouah as Terso
- Majid Michel as Bobby
- Nse Ikpe Etim as Liz
- Mercy Johnson as Boma
- Omoni Oboli as Nse
- Desmond Elliot as Mr Okoro
- Rukky Sanda as Chidinma
- Beverly Naya as Bella
- Temisan Etsede as Business Partner
- Ibiwari Etuk as Tosan
- Esther Eyibio as Efe
- Paul Frank as Oriaifo
- Robert Loner as Kenechi
- Archie Sam as Lucas

== Reception ==
Nollywood Reinvented gave it a rating of 3 out of 5 stars, commended the actors in the film and noted the plot had both derivative aspects and some originality. Joy Isi Bewaji of Nigeria Entertainment Today praised the interpretation of roles by the top cast actors and described the plot as "subtly unravelling".

== See also ==
- List of Nigerian films of 2009
