= Akofa Edjeani Asiedu =

Ghanaian actress, producer and entrepreneur

Akofa Edjeani
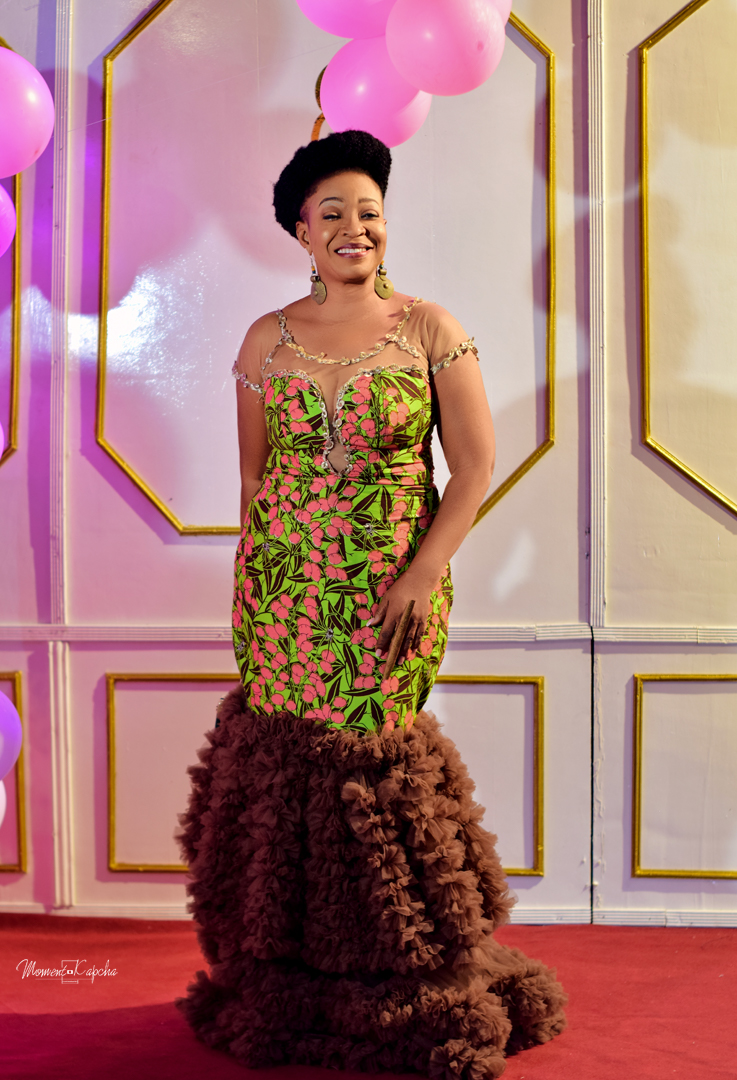
- Born: Akofa Edjeani; February 20, 1969 (age 57)
- Education: University of Ghana, Ghana Institute of Journalism
- Occupations: Actress; producer; entrepreneur
- Years active: 1987–present
- Spouse: Robert Asiedu (div)
- Children: 2
- Awards: Africa Movie Academy Awards in 2010

Akofa Edjeani (born 20 February 1969) is a Ghanaian veteran film actress, producer and entrepreneur. Her short film, Not My Daughter (a film about female genital mutilation), won Best Short Film award at the Africa Movie Academy Awards (AMAA) in 2008, and I Sing of a Well, the movie she starred in and co-produced, won three awards and the Best Jury Award from Africa Movie Academy Awards in 2010.

== Early life and education ==
Akofa was born on 20 February 1969 and hails from Avatime Vane, an aboriginal Guan settlement in the Volta Region of Ghana. She had her secondary school education at Mawuli School where she started acting as a member of the school's drama club. She holds a bachelor's degree in arts from the University of Ghana Performing Arts and a certificate in PR, Marketing and advertising from the Ghana Institute of Journalism (1995).

== Career ==
Edjeani is an actress by profession, she studied Performing Arts at the University of Ghana. She has acted in several Ghanaian and Nigerian-Ghanaian movies since mid 1990s. In 1995, she acted in For Better For Worse, 2015 she featured in the British-Ghanaian award-winning movie, The Cursed Ones. She was a member of the Interim Governing Council of the Ghana Culture Forum.

Akofa was given a special recognition and inducted into the Golden Movie Walk of Fame.

== Personal life ==
Edjeani was married to Robert Asiedu for over 20 years, the couple later separated and divorced. In July 2018, she made it known in an interview with Deloris Frimpong Manso, on her show, The Delay Show that she was divorced but dating and planning to remarry. She is the younger sister of Constance Ama Emefa Edjeani-Afenu. She has two children.

== Other ventures ==
Edjeani runs a restaurant in Kanda, Accra, as at 2016 she made it known in an interview that set up the restaurant 17 years ago to sell food to support her family.

== Selected filmography ==
- For Better For Worse (1995)
- Dirty Tears
- Jennifer (1998) - Jennifer
- When the Heart Decides (1997)
- Harvest at 17
- Expectations (1998) - Gifty
- ꞌꞌExpectations 2ꞌꞌ (1999) - Gifty
- Divine Love (2004) - Ann Bertel
- Holby City (2005) - Joanna Myatt
- My Mother's Heart 1&2 (2005) - Nana Yaa
- Life in Slow Motion (2008) - Afua
- I Sing of a Well (2009) - Soraya
- Pieces of Me (2015) - Sally
- The Cursed Ones (2015) - Choir Mistress
- Children of the Mountain (2016) - Asantewaa
- Sidechic Gang (2018) - Aunty Vero
- Lucky (2018) - Eno
- Azali (2018) - Rukaya
- Dark Spot (2019) - Lawyer
- Fools in Love
- Not my Daughter
- Can't Say Mother (2020) - Afua
- Gold Coast Lounge (2020) - Aunty Adjoa
- Aloe Vera (2020) - Mama Aloe
- Charade (2021)
- The Spots in the Light (2022)
- Shades of Grace (2023)
- Detor: The Rise of A Warrior Hunter (2024)

== See also ==
- Ama K. Abebrese
- Rama Brew
