= First Digital TV =

First Digital TV is a digital terrestrial television network based in Ghana. It is headquartered in Accra and provides a range of media services.

The company started providing its services on 12 December 2013.
