= Nafisat Abdullahi =

Nigerian actress and filmmaker (born 1992)

- Born: Nafisat Abdulrahman Abdullahi; January 23, 1991 (age 35); Jos, Plateau State, Nigeria
- Citizenship: Nigeria
- Education: University of Jos
- Occupations: Actor, photographer, director, filmmaker
- Years active: 2010–present

Nafisat Abdullahi (born Nafisat Abdulrahman Abdullahi) is a Nigerian actress, director, and filmmaker who works in Kannywood and Nollywood film industry.

== Biography ==
Abdullahi was born on 23 January 1991 in Jos, Plateau State, as the fourth daughter to father Abdulrahman Abdullahi, and mother, Zainab Abdullah. She had her primary education in an Airforce Private School in Jos, and attended Government Girls Secondary School Dutse in Abuja. She graduated with a degree in Theatre Art from the University of Jos, as well as in Photography from the London School of Photography.

== Career ==
In 2010, Abdullahi started her career at the age of 18 in her first movie (Sai wata rana). The movie rose her fame which she played her role alongside other actors like Ali Nuhu, Adam A Zango, and Fati Washa.

Abdullahi runs two business outside her acting career. Her makeup brand is one of them and was launched in July 2021.

== Controversy ==
In June 2013, she was suspended by a disciplinary committee of Arewa Filmmakers Association of Nigeria for failing to appear before the committee after being summoned for organizing a banned event by the followers of the Hausa movie industry. She was handed two years suspension by the disciplinary committee which was lifted in August 2013.

She went on to participate in Aminu Saira's Kalamu Wahid and Ya Daga Allah in 2014.

== Ambassador ==
Abdullahi got an endorsement with a real estate companions called TPumpy, in Abuja. Late 2021 Abdullahi signed another contract with Pepsi.

== Filmography ==
- Kamanni (2022)
- Bana Bakwai (2020)
- Yaki a Soyayya (2018)
- In Love and Ashes (2018 TV Series) as Maryam
- In Search of the King (2018)
- Akasi (2016)
- Akwai Dalili (2016) as Bilikisu
- Dan Marayan Zaki (2012) as Aziza
- Blood and Henna (2012)
- Madubin Dubawa (2012) as Feema
- Sai Wata Rana (2010) as Safina
- Addini ko Al’Ada
- Allo
- Yar Agadez
- Ban Kasheta Ba
- Ya daga Allah
- Ummi
- Baban Sadik
- Dawo Dawo
- Alhaki Kwikwiyo
- Farar Saka
- Cikin Waye?
- Zango
- Gabar Cikin Gida
- Alkawarina
- Har Abada
- Dan Almajiri
- Laifin Dadi
- Alhini
- Badi Ba Rai
- Fataken Dare
- Baiwar Allah
- Lamiraj
- Dare
- Guguwar So
- Haaja
- Jari Hujja

== Awards and nominations ==
Year	Award	Category	Film	Result
2013	City People Entertainment Awards	Best Actress of the Year (Kannywood)	Ya Daga Allah	Won
2014	City People Entertainment Award	Best Actress of the Year (Kannywood)	Special Awards	Nominated
2014	1st Kannywood Awards	Best Kannywood Actress (Popular Choice Award)	Dan Marayan Zaki	Won
2014	Africa Movie Academy Awards	Best Actress of the Year	Dan Marayan Zaki	Won
2015	City People Entertainment Award	Best Actress of the Year (Kannywood)	Special Awards	Nominated
2015	2nd Kannywood Awards	Best Kannywood Actress	Special Awards	Won
2016	City People Entertainment Award	Best Actress of the Year (Kannywood)	Special Awards	Won
2016	AMMA Awards	Best Actress of the Year	Da'iman	Won
2016	3rd Kannywood Awards	Best Kannywood Actress	Baiwar Allah	Won
2016	MTN award			
2017	Afro Hollywood Award			
