= Mansoor (film) =

2017 Nigerian drama film

- Directed by: Ali Nuhu
- Written by: Jamilu Nafsen; Ali Nuhu
- Produced by: Naziru Danhajiya
- Starring: Umar M Shareef; Maryam Yahya; Ali Nuhu; Abba Elmustapha; Baballe Hayatu
- Production company: FKD Production
- Release date: 30 June 2017
- Running time: 96 minutes
- Country: Nigeria
- Language: English

Mansoor is a 2017 Nigerian drama film directed by Ali Nuhu and produced by Naziru Danhajiya. The film stars Umar M Shareef in the title role with Maryam Yahya, Ali Nuhu, Abba Elmustapha, and Baballe Hayatu in supporting roles.

The film received mostly positive critics acclaim and screened worldwide. The film won the award for the Best Indigenous Movie of the Year in Hausa Category at the Africa Magic Viewers' Choice Awards 2018, (AMVCA). Lead actress Maryam Yahaya was nominated as Best Promising Actress by City People Entertainment Awards in 2017.

== Cast ==
- Umar M Shareef as Mansoor
- Maryam Yahya as Maryam
- Ali Nuhu as Abubakar
- Abba El-Mustapha as Usman
- Baballe Hayatu as Umar
- Sadiq Ahmad as Ismail
- Teema Yola as Laure
- Nabila Mohd Zain as Rahila
- Garzali Miko as T.J.
- Ahmed Bello as Zubairu
- Jamilu Sani as Khamis
- Asiya Barade as Suwaira
- Tijani Faraga as Alh. Danlami Ali
- Baba Hasin as Mallam Sani
- Baba Karami as Alh. Hamisu
- Rashida Lobbo as Yar Alh. Usman
- Bashir Nayaya as Principal
- Teema Yola as Laure
- Tahir I. Tahir as Mal Buba

== Awards and nominations ==
Year	Award ceremony	Prize	Result	Ref
2018	Best of Nollywood Awards	Best Actor in a Lead role –Hausa	Nominated	
2018	Best of Nollywood Awards	Best Actress in a Lead role –Hausa	Nominated	
