= Leila Djansi =

American-Ghanaian filmmaker

Leila Afua Djansi
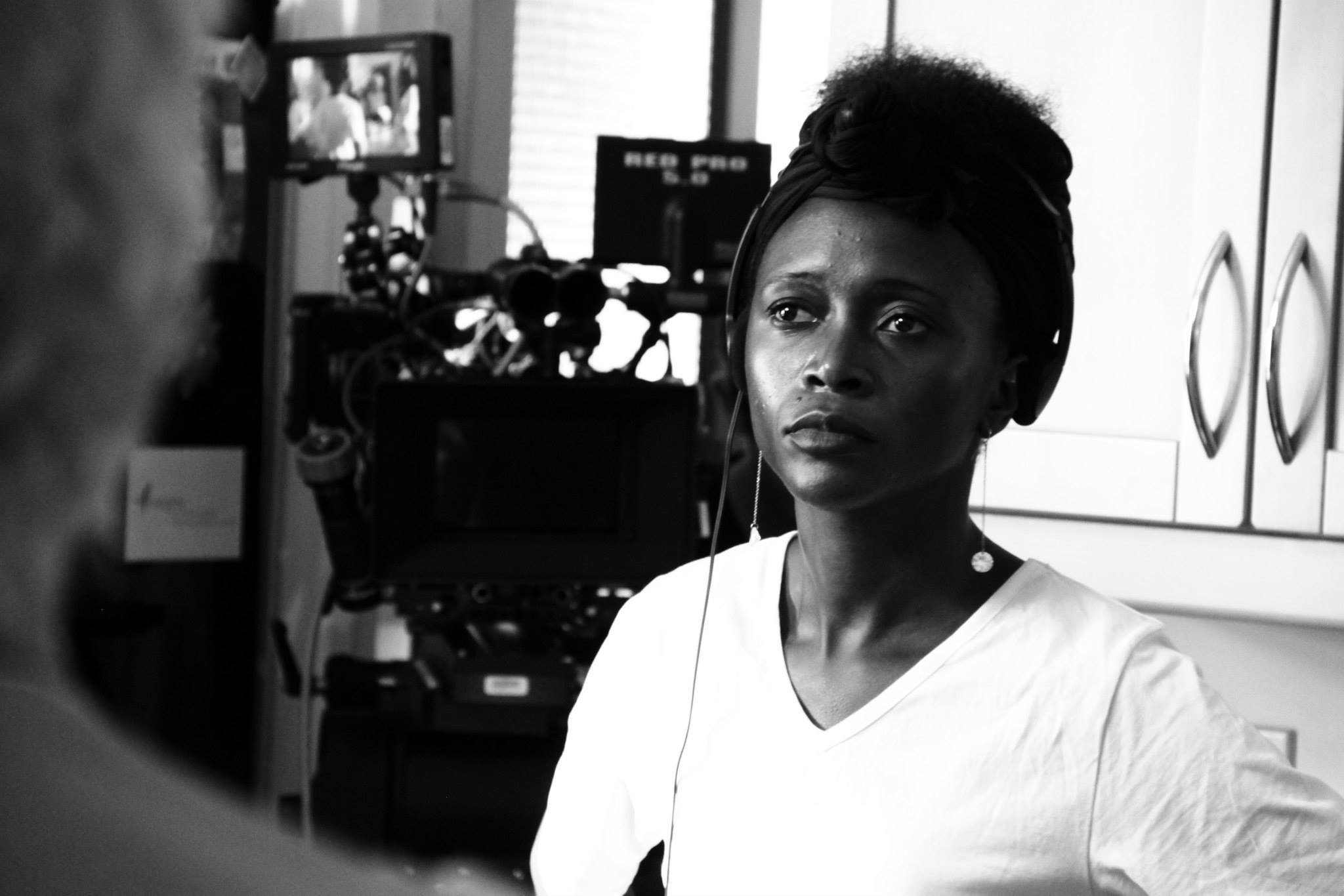
- Born: Leila Afua Djansi; 17 July; Bangalore
- Occupation: Filmmaker
- Known for: Like Cotton Twines (2016)

Leila Afua Djansi is an American-Ghanaian filmmaker who started her film career in the Ghana film industry.

== Early life ==
Leila Afua Djansi was born on 17 July, Her father was a pilot, and her mother, a senior nursing officer. Djansi grew up in India and Ghana. Although acting and writing were her hobbies, her career ambition was to become a gynaecologist, a plan that later changed when she developed an interest in forensics. While studying criminology, another career change occurred when she met the Ghanaian actor Sam Odoi, who convinced her to write a script for him. She was 19 years old when her script Babina was made into a movie by producer Akwetey Kanyi.

== Education ==
Djansi attended the Kabore Primary and JSS, Mawuli School for primary, junior and secondary education respectively all located in Ho, in the Volta Region of Ghana.

She began her film education at the National Film and Television School, but left Ghana for the United States to continue her Film and Television Degree at Savannah College of Art and Design on an artistic honour scholarship.

== Career ==
She was president of the Ghana Library Board Readers Club for three years, Djansi began her career in the entertainment industry in 1998 when she was a runner-up in a regional beauty pageant in junior high school.

Djansi began her filmmaking career in Ghana at the age of 19 with the Ghana Film Company. Djansi worked with the state-owned Gama Film Company, where she wrote and produced Legacy of Love.

Her directorial debut I Sing of a Well in 2009 netted a unique 11 nominations at the Africa Movie Academy Awards, winning the Special Jury Award for Overall Best Film. Furthermore, the film was presented with the BAFTA/LA Choice Award at the Pan African Film Festival for excellence in filmmaking.

Djansi followed with the advocacy film Sinking Sands which supports the Say No to Violence Against Women Campaign for UNiFEM Ghana. In 2011, Djansi's Ties That Bind won Best Diaspora Film at the San Diego Black Film Festival, it also became an official selection to AFI's New African Films Festival in 2012. Kimberly Elise was the star of the film, who was nominated for Best Actress at the American Black Film Festival. The film was also formally selected for Outstanding Foreign Film at the 2012 Black Reel Awards.

Djansi's Like Cotton Twines was an official selection to the 2016 Los Angeles Film Festival under the World Fiction Section. The film shot entirely on location in Ghana explores issues of modern-day slavery when an African American volunteer travels to a rural community in Ghana to teach and discovers one of his students, a 14-year-old girl, has to become a religious slave.

Her other credits include Where Children Play with Grammy winner Macy Gray, the LA Film Festival Best Episodic Television Show 40 and Single for AMC's Urban Movie Channel, and All The Men in my Life starring Rochelle Aytes.

Djansi has been recognized by various international organizations for continuously using filmmaking to bring light to women's issues, and she has continuously made movies for women and about women while employing diversity behind and in front of the camera. She is also admired for revolutionizing Ghana’s film industry with I Sing of Well, which marked the onset of a unique narrative style never before seen in West African storytelling. Her work also inspired Ghanaian filmmakers to return, contributing to the telling of African stories. Djansi continues to receive praises for using film to narrate stories of women of black descent.

== Awards and recognition ==
Djansi's first film was awarded a 2009 worldFest Platinum Award; the film, Grass Between My Lips, is a story of female circumcision and early marriage, set in a northern Ghana village.
In 2010, her debut feature, I Sing of a Well was nominated for 11 Africa Movie Academy Awards. The film won 3 awards: Best Sound, Best Costume, and the Jury Special Award for Overall Best Film. In 2011, Djansi was presented with the BAFTA/LA Pan African Film Festival Choice Award for the film I Sing of a Well.

Djansi's 2011 film Sinking Sands received 10 Africa Movie Academy Award nominations, with Ama K Abebrese winning the Best Actress Award and Djansi earning the Best Original Screenplay Award.

Djansi's third directorial effort Ties That Bind received a Black Reel Awards Nomination in 2012. The film also won the Best Diaspora Film at the 2012 San Diego Black Film Festival.

In 2016, Djansi directed Like Cotton Twines, an exploration of the practice of Trokosi in her native Ghana. The film was nominated for "Best World Fiction Film" at the Los Angeles Film Festival. ‘’Like Cotton Twines’’ also secured the Best Narrative Feature award at the 2016 Savannah Film Festival, clinching the same honour at the Riverbend Film Festival in 2017.

Her other credits include Film Independent Best Episodic for 2018 40 and Single which was created for AMCs' Allblk
