= 9th Africa Movie Academy Awards =

2013 film awards ceremony

- Official poster
- Date: 20 April 2013
- Site: Gloryland Cultural Centre, Yenagoa, Bayelsa, Nigeria
- Hosted by: Ama Abebrese; Dakore Akande; Ayo Makun
- Produced by: Dayo Ogunyemi; Kingsley Ogoro
- Organized by: Africa Film Academy

Highlights
- Best Film: Confusion Na Wa
- Most awards: Confusion Na Wa; Nairobi Half Life and; Elelwani; (2)
- Most nominations: Elelwani (11)

The 9th Africa Movie Academy Awards ceremony honouring movies of 2012 was held in Yenagoa, Bayelsa State on 20 April 2013. The event was hosted by actress and former AMAA winner Ama K. Abebrese and Ayo Makun with many celebrities in attendance. The awards' nomination party was held in Lilongwe, Malawi; it was hosted by President Joyce Banda. A total of 671 films were submitted for consideration across Africa, America, Canada, France, Germany, Guadalupe, Italy, Jamaica, and the United Kingdom. Confusion Na Wa won the best picture award. The late Justus Esiri was awarded the Best Actor in a leading role posthumously.

== Winners and nominees ==
A total of 29 award categories were given out. Below is a full list of all the winners. Winners are listed first and highlighted in boldface:

=== Awards ===
Best Short Film	Best Documentary
**Kwaku Ananse : Ghana**; Dead River : Namibia; Elegy For A Revolutionary : South Africa; Yellow Fever : Kenya; Nhamo : Zimbabwe; Big Daddy : Nigeria; Release : South Africa; Burnt Forest : Kenya	**Fuelling Poverty : Nigeria**; Gun to Tape : Kenya; Swimming The Zambezi : South Africa; Give Me Back My Home : Kenya; The African Cypher Fly On The Wall: South Africa
Best Diaspora Feature	Best Diaspora Documentary
**Stones In The Sun : Haiti / United States**; Against The Grain' : United States; Between Friends: Trinidad / Tobago	**Fan Do Brasil : Guadeloupe / Brasil**; My Thiero Boys : United States; Red, White, Black And Blue : United States
Best Animation	Best Film by an African Abroad
**Adventures Of Zambezia : South Africa**; Tageni’s Dol : Namibia; Mission Impossible : Nigeria; Oba : Nigeria; Lion Of Judah : South Africa	**Last Flight to Abuja: United Kingdom / Nigeria**; Turning Point : United States / Nigeria; The Assassin's Practice : United Kingdom / Nigeria; Bianca : United States / Nigeria; Woolwich Boys : United Kingdom / Nigeria
Achievement in Production Design	Achievement in Costume Design
**Elelwani**; Virgin Magarida; The Twin Sword; Contract; Blood and Henna; Okoro The Prince	**Blood and Henna**; The Twin Sword; Elelwani; Virgin Magarida; The Meeting; Cobweb
Achievement in Makeup	Achievement in Soundtrack
**The Meeting**; The Twin Sword; Elelwani; Ninah’s Dowry; Okoro The Prince; Uhlanga, The Mark	**The Last Fishing Boat**; Journey to Self; Okoro The Prince; Hoodrush; Nairobi Half Life; The Twin Sword
Achievement in Visual Effects	Achievement in Sound
**The Twin Sword**; Okoro The Prince; Elelwani; Last Flight to Abuja; Uhlanga, The Mark; Awakening	**Nairobi Half Life**; Last Flight to Abuja; Streets Of Calabar; Heroes and Zeros; Zama Zama; Virgin Magarida
Achievement in Cinematography	Achievement in Editing
**Uhlanga the Mark**; Virgin Magarida; Nairobi Half Life; Swirl In Bamako; The Twin Sword; Elelwani	**Heroes and Zeros**; Last Flight to Abuja; Contract; Elelwani; Nairobi Half Life; Uhlanga the Mark
Achievement in Lighting	Achievement in Screenplay
**Moi Zaphira**; Zama Zama; Flower Girl; Elelwani; Uhlanga The Mark	**Heroes and Zeros**; Contract; Ninah’s Dowry; Alan Poza; Blood and Henna; Zama Zama
Best Nigerian film	Best film in an African Language
**Confusion Na Wa**; Blood and Henna; Heroes and Zeros; The Meeting; The Twin Sword; Kokomma; Okoro The Prince	**Moi Zaphira : Burkina Faso**; Elelwani : South Africa; The Last Fishing Boat : Malawi; Nairobi Half Life : Kenya; Blood and Henna : Nigeria; Sherifa : Togo; Kokomma: Nigeria
Best Child Actor	Most Promising Actor
**The Ugandan**; Cobweb; Imbabazi, The Pardon; Ninah’s Dowry; Swirl In Bamako; Salimatu Traore (moi Zaphira)	**Joseph Wairimu : Nairobi Half Life** (co-winner); **Belinda Effah : Kokomma** (co-winner); Sumela Maculuva : Virgin Magarida; Shonelo Mbutho : Ulanga The Mark; Karoumwi Olakunle : The Twin Sword
Best Actor In A Supporting Role	Best Actress In A Supporting Role
**Gabriel Afolayan** : Hoodrush; Ali Nuhu : Blood and Henna; Olwenya Maina : Nairobi Half Life; Alfred Atungu : The Twin Sword; Ikponmwosa Gold : Confusion Na Wa	**Hermelinda Cimela** : Virgin Magarida; Patience Ozokwor: Turning Point; Linda Ejiofor : The Meeting; Crista Eka : Ninah’s Dowry; Foluke Daramola : Cobweb
Best Actor In A Leading Role	Best Actress In A Leading Role
**Justus Esiri : The Assassin's Practice**; OC Ukeje : Alan Poza; Bimbo Manuel : Heroes and Zeros; Lindani Nkosi : Zama Zama; Hlomla Dandala : Contract; Femi Jacobs : The Meeting; Amurin Wumnembom : Ninah’s Dowry	**Florence Masebe : Elelwani**; Yvonne Okoro : Contract; Mariam Ouedraogo : Moi Zaphira; Rita Dominic : The Meeting; Mbutung Seikeh : Ninah's Diary; Flora Suya : Last Fishing Boat
Best Director	Best film
**Niji Akanni : Heroes And Zeroes**; Kenneth Gyang : Confusion Na Wa; Shemu Joyah : The Last Fishing Boat; Shirley Frimpong-Manso: Contract; David 'Tosh' Gitonga : Nairobi Half Life; Ntshavheni Wa Luruli : Elelwani	**Confusion Na Wa : Nigeria**; Nairobi Half Life : Kenya; Ninah’s Dowry : Cameroon; The Last Fishing Boat : Malawi; Virgin Margarida : Mozambique; Elelwani : South Africa; Last Flight to Abuja : Nigeria

== Honorary awards ==
=== Lifetime Achievement Awards ===
- Tunde Kelani
- Chief Eddi Ugbomah
- Sir Ositadinma Okeke Oguno (Ossy Affason)
- Ayuko Badu
- Chief Pete Edochie

=== Special Recognition of Pillars of Nollywood ===
- Emem Isong
- Kanayo O. Kanayo
- Kenneth Okonkwo
- Film/Video Producers and Marketers Association of Nigeria (FVPMAN)

=== Special Jury Award ===
- Ninah’s Dairy (Cameroon)
