= 6th Africa Movie Academy Awards =

2010 film awards ceremony

- Date: 10 April 2010
- Site: Gloryland Cultural Center; Yenagoa, Bayelsa State, Nigeria
- Organized by: Africa Film Academy

Highlights
- Best Picture: The Figurine
- Most awards: The Figurine (5)
- Most nominations: I Sing of a Well (11)

The 6th Africa Movie Academy Awards ceremony was held on 10 April 2010 at the Gloryland Cultural Center in Yenagoa, Bayelsa State, Nigeria, to honour the best African films of 2009. The nominees were announced on 6 March 2010 at the Mensvic Grand Hotel in Accra, Ghana at an event that was attended by delegates from Nigeria, top government officials from Ghana and African celebrities. Hollywood stars, Glynn Turman and CCH Pounder were the special guests from Hollywood. Approximately 280 films from 32 African countries were nominated for the awards.

== Winners ==
=== Major awards ===
The winners of the 24 Award Categories are listed first and highlighted in bold letters.

| Best Picture | Best Director |
|---|---|
| The Figurine (Nigeria); Seasons of a life (Malawi); The Tenant (Nigeria); The Perfect Picture (Ghana); I Sing of a Well (Ghana) | Shirley Frimpong-Manso – The Perfect Picture; Shemu Joyah – Seasons of a life; Kunle Afolayan – The Figurine; Leila Jewel Djansi – I Sing of a Well; Jude Idada and Lucky Ejim – The Tenant |
| Best Actress in a Leading role | Best Actor in a Leading role |
| Jackie Appiah & Lydia Forson – The Perfect Picture; Bimbo Akintola – Freedom in Chains; Stephanie Okereke – Nnenda; Flora Suya – Season of a life; Akofa Edjeani Asiedu – I Sing of a Well | Ramsey Nouah – The Figurine; Lucky Ejim – The Tenant; Majid Michel – Sin of a soul; Sadiq Abu – Soul Diaspora; John Osie Tutu Agyeman – I Sing of a Well |
| Best Actress in a Supporting Role | Best Actor in a Supporting Role |
| Tapiwa Gwaza – Seasons of a life; Doris Sakitey – A Sting in a Tale; Funlola Aoifeyebi-Raimi – The Figurine; Yvonne Nelson – Heart of Men | Adjetey Anang – The Perfect Picture; Godwin Kotey – I Sing of a Well; Francis Duru – Nnenda; Yemi Blaq – High Blood Pressure |
| Most Promising Actress | Most Promising Actor |
| Chelsea Eze – Silent Scandals; Rehema Nanfuka co-winner – Imani; Martha Kisaka – Togetherness Supreme**Martha Ankomah – Sins of the Soul; Ashionye Michelle Ugboh– Jungle Ride | Wilson Maina – Togetherness Supreme; Wole Ojo – The Child; John Dumelo – Heart of men; Pethro Tumba Mbole – A game of my life; Sunny Chikezie – Lilies of the Ghetto |
| Best Animation | Best Film in an African Language |
| Hanayns Shoe (Egypt); Adventure of Alayo (Nigeria); Zoodo – (Burkina Faso); Lyrics – (Algeria); One Step of Love (Algeria) | Imani – (Uganda); Omo Iya Kan – (Nigeria); Aldeweden – (Ethiopia); Togetherness Supreme – (Kenya); Game of my life – (South Africa) |
| Best Child Actor | Best Screenplay |
| Teddy Onyago and Bill Oloo – Togetherness Supreme; Tobi Oboli – The Figurine; Feyisola Ewulomi – Champions of our Time; Treasure Obasi – Champions of our Time; Mfanafuthi Magudulela – Game of my life | I Sing of a Well; Season of a life; The Tenant; Freedom in chains; Guilty Pleasures |

=== Additional awards ===
| Best Documentary | Best Short Film |
|---|---|
| Bariga Boys (Nigeria); Mwamba Ngoma (Tanzania); Peace Wanted Alive (Kenya); En quette d’identite (Burkina Faso); Innovating for Africa (Nigeria) | The Abyss Boys – (South Africa); Mahala – (Mozambique); The Painter – (Uganda); Suara La – (Nigeria); The Camera (Nigeria) |
| AMAA Achievement in Sound | AMAA Achievement in Editing |
| I Sing of a Well; The Tenant; Season of a life; Perfect Picture; Soul Diaspora | The Child; Season of a life; Perfect Picture; Heart of Men; Lilies of the Ghetto |
| AMAA Achievement in Art Direction | AMAA Achievement in Cinematography |
| Fulani; I Sing of a Well; The Child; The Figurine; Imani | The Figurine; The Perfect Picture; I sing of a well; The Child; The Tenant |
| AMAA Achievement in Makeup | AMAA Achievement in Costume |
| The Child; I Sing of a Well; Heart of Men; The King is Mine; Fulani | I Sing of a Well; Perfect Picture; Prince’s bride; The Child; Lilies of the Ghetto |
| Best Original Soundtrack | AMAA Achievement in Visual Effect |
| A Sting in a Tale; Seasons of a life; Imani; The Child; The Figurine | The Figurine; The Child; A Sting in a Tale; Fulani; Heart of Men |
| Heart of Africa (This award is given to the Best Film in Nigeria) | Best film by an African Filmmaker in Diaspora |
| The Figurine – Kunle Afolayan; Nnenda – Izu Ojukwu; Freedom in Chain – Bond Emeruwa and Fred Amata; The Child – Izu Ojukwu; High Blood Pressure – Teco Benson | Soul Diaspora; Okra Principle; China Wahala; Crunch |

== See also ==
CNN – Inside Africa – The African Movie Academy Awards ceremony, April 2010
