= I Sing of a Well =

- Directed by: Leila Djansi
- Written by: Jot Agyeman
- Starring: Jimmy Jean-Louis; Jot Agyeman; Prince David Osei
- Production company: Calabash Images
- Distributed by: Turning Point Pictures
- Release date: 13 October 2009
- Country: Ghana
- Language: English
- Budget: $100, 000

I Sing of a Well is a 2009 Ghanaian film directed by Leila Djansi. It stars Jimmy Jean-Louis, Jot Agyeman and Freeman Ekow.

== Cast ==
- Jot Agyeman as Prince Wenambe
- Akofa Edjeani Asiedu
- Samuel Annang as Elder
- Edna Asare as Palace Maid
- Comfort Bawa as Village Woman
- Jerry Botwe as Announcer
- Freeman Ekow as Omuaru
- Jimmy Jean-Louis as Narrator
