= Kenneth Gyang =

Nigerian filmmaker

- Born: Barkin Ladi, Plateau State, Nigeria
- Citizenship: Nigeria
- Education: National film Institute
- Occupation: Filmmaker
- Years active: 2006-present
- Organization: Cinema Kpatakpata
- Notable work: Confusion Na Wa (2013)

Kenneth Gyang (born in Barkin Ladi of Plateau State, Nigeria) is a Nigerian writer, director, and filmmaker who co-founded the Nigerian film studio Cinema Kpatakpata. He is most well known for his 2013 comedy film Confusion Na Wa. and the 2019 Thriller film "Oloture" produced by Ebonylife Films. Oloture proved that Ebonylife Films could make serious films about social issues after its release.

== Career ==
Kenneth Gyang studied Film Production at the National Film Institute in Jos and screenwriting at Gaston Kaboré's IMAGINE in Ouagadougou, Burkina Faso.

Gyang co-founded the Nigerian film studio Cinema Kpatakpata in 2010 with Yinka Edward and Tom Rowlands-Rees.

Gyang has worked with the BBC World Service Trust, directing their high-quality TV drama Wetin Dey which was presented at the International Emmy World Television Festival in New York City. He has also worked with Communicating For Change as an Associate Producer on Bayelsian Silhouettes- a series of seven short films on HIV/AIDS. His most recent work is Finding Aisha, a TV series he co-wrote, produced and directed for the Nigerian production company Televista. He directed the AMAA award-winning film Blood and Henna about Meningitis in Northern Nigeria.

== Awards and honors ==
In 2013, his debut feature film Confusion Na Wa produced by Tom Rowland Rees was highly acclaimed and went ahead to win the AMAA Awards 2013 for Best Film and Best Nigerian film, also the film went ahead in 2014 to win Nollywood Movie Award for Best Cinematography (Yinka Edwards) and Nollywood Movie Award for Best Director (Kenneth Gyang). It also won Best Film at the Africa Motion Awards in Bayelsa. Gyang also won The Future Awards 2013 Prize In Arts & Culture.

== Works ==
- Mummy Lagos, short film
- Omule, short film
- Blood and Henna (2012), feature film
- Confusion Na Wa (2012), feature film, debut of Cinema Kpatakpata
- Wetin Dey
- Finding Aisha
- The Lost Cafe (2018)
- Oloture (2019)
- Castle & Castle (2018)
- Blood Sisters (2018)
- Sons of the Caliphate (2016-2018 TV Series)
- Mojisola (2023)
- This is Lagos (2023)
- Oloture: The Journey (2024)
