= Ali Nuhu =

Nigerian actor and director (born 1974)

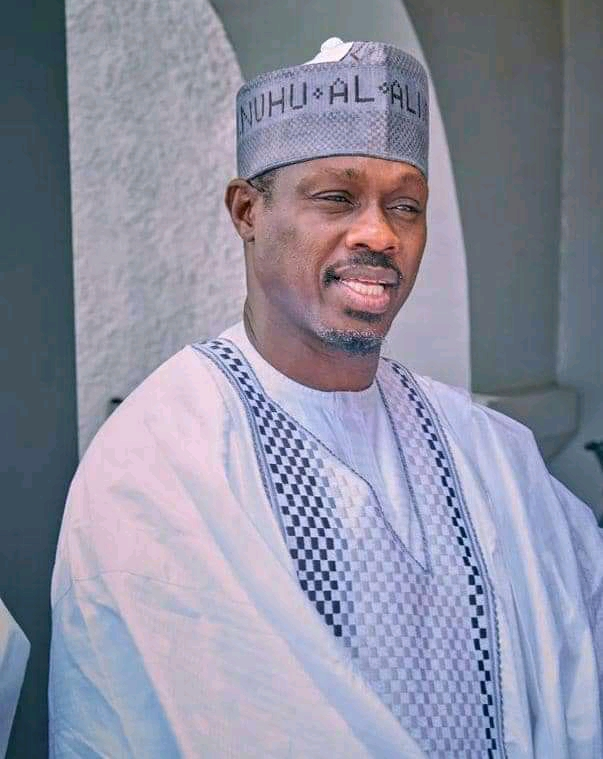
- Nuhu in 2024
- Born: Ali Nuhu Mohammed; 15 March 1974 (age 52); Maiduguri, Borno, Nigeria
- Education: BA Geography
- Alma mater: University of Jos
- Occupation: Actor
- Years active: 1999–present
- Children: 2

Mohammed Ali Nuhu (born 15 March 1974) is a Nigerian actor who serves as the managing director of the Nigerian Film Corporation since January 2024. Married to Maimuna Garba in 2003, the couple have 2 children. He has appeared in Hausa and English films and is often regarded as "king of kannywood". Nuhu is widely regarded as one of the greatest and most influential actors of all time in Hausa Cinema. He has been described as the most successful Hausa film actor in the world.

== Early life and education ==
Ali Nuhu Mohammed was born in Maiduguri, Borno State, Nigeria. His father, Nuhu Poloma, was from Balanga in Gombe State and his mother, Fatima Karderam Digema, was from Bama in Borno State. He grew up in Kano and attended Dawakin Tofa Science College. He had his degree in Geography from the University of Jos.

After serving in the National Youth Service Corps for one year in Ibadan, he took courses in filmmaking from the Asian Academy of Film and Television in Delhi. He also studied transmedia story telling in the University of Southern California.

== Acting career ==
Nuhu made his acting debut with the 1999 film Abin sirri ne. He is best known for his role in Sangaya, which became one of the highest-grossing Hausa films at the time. Ali Nuhu starred in several sequel films, including Azal, Jarumin Maza, and Sitanda and was awarded Best Actor in a supporting role during the Africa Movie Academy Awards in (2007). In 2019, Nuhu celebrated his 20th anniversary in the entertainment industry. He has appeared in about five hundred movies.

== Filmography ==
=== Nigerian Movies ===
Year	Title	Role	Genre	Production company
2007	Sitanda	Sitanda	Drama	Amstel Malta Boxoffice
2011	Carbin Kwai	Abba	Drama	FKD Production
2012	Madubin Dubawa	Khalid	Drama	FKD Production
2012	Last Flight to Abuja	Dan	Drama	Nollywood Film Factory
2012	Blood and Henna	Actor	Drama	Newage Networks
2013	Confusion Na Wa	Bello	Drama	Cinema KpataKpata
2013	Wani Hanin	Actor	Drama	Giggs International
2014	Matan Gida	Actor	Drama	Mai Kwai Movies
2015	Jinin Jikina	Actor	Drama	Shareef Studios
2016	Nasibi	Actor	Drama	3SP International
2016	Ojukokoro	Jubril	Drama	Singularity Media
2016	Mansoor	Abubakar	Drama	FKD Production
2017	Banana Island Ghost	Mr. King	Drama	Biola Alabi Media
2017	Hakkunde	Dr Waziri	Drama	Phoenix Films & Media Productions / Asurf Films
2019	One Lagos Night	Radiant	Comedy	Riverside Productions/Bukana Motion Pictures
2019	The Millions	Sheikh		
2019	Diamonds In The Sky	Faisal Dalhaty	Drama	Leah Foundation
2020	Dear Affy	Khalid	Drama	007 Global
2021	Amina	Danjuma	Drama	BlackScreen Entertainment / Videosonic Studios / Netflix
2021	One Lagos Night			
2025	Makemation	Coach Gyang		

=== Kannywood Series ===
Year	Title	Role	Genre	Production company
2020	Izzar So	Actor	Drama	Bakori TV
2022	Alaqa	Director/Actor	Drama	FKD Productions

== Awards and nominations ==
Nuhu is one of the most decorated actors in the Hausa Cinema, he frequently appears on listings of the most popular, stylish and influential people in Nigeria. He has regularly featured among the top ten of the 100 most influential men in Nigeria. Nuhu has been brand ambassador of various governmental and nongovernmental campaigns including Globacom, OMO, Samsung and others. He received an honorary doctorate from ISM Adonai American University, Benin Republic in 2018.

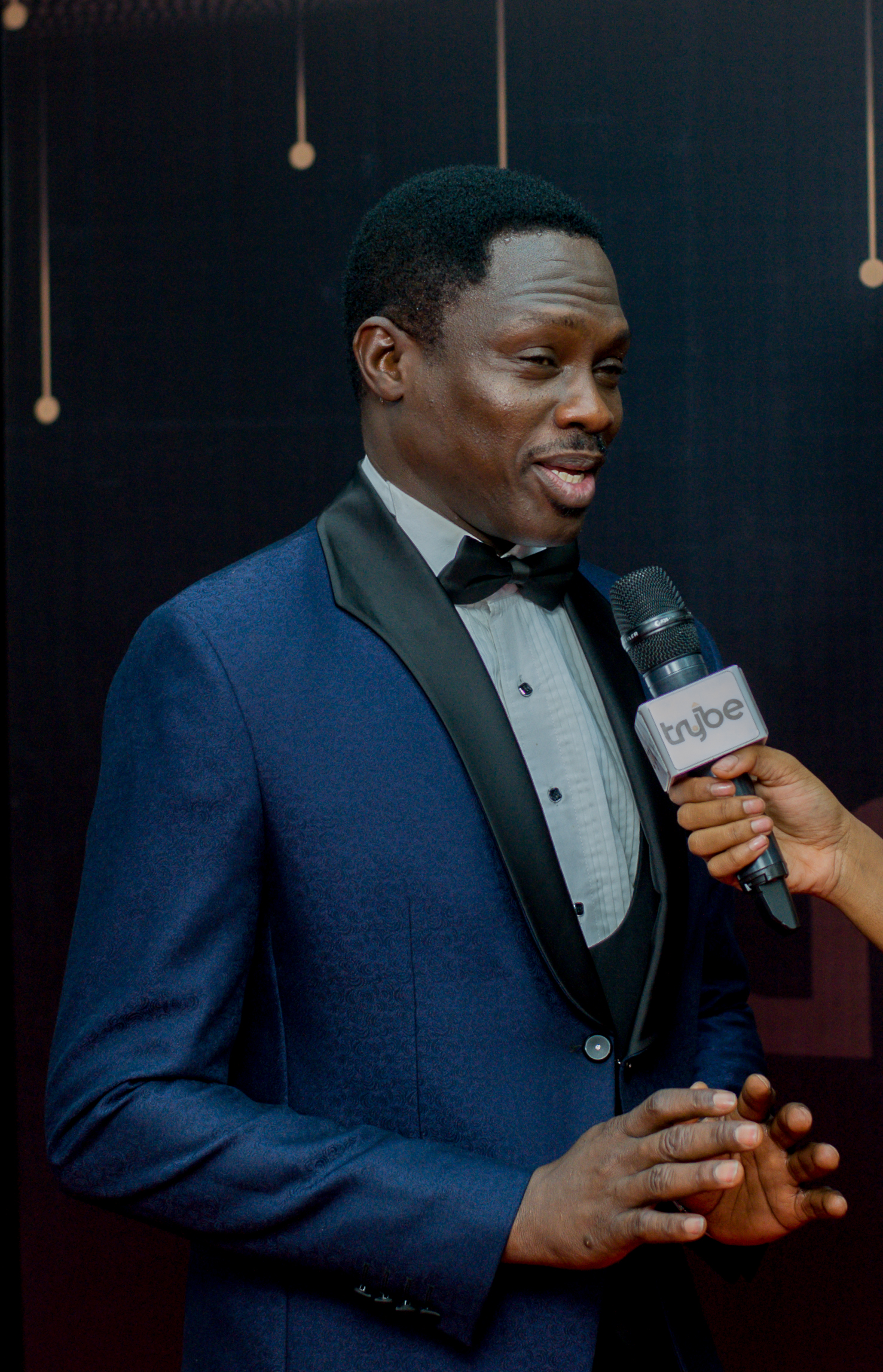
Nuhu at the AMCVA 2020

Ali Nuhu recently became an ambassador for cereal brand, Checkers Custard.

Year	Award	Category	Result
2005	Arewa Films Award	Best Actor	Won
2007	3rd Africa Movie Academy Awards	Best Upcoming Actor award	Won
2008	The Future Award	Best Actor	Won
2011	Zulu African Film Academy Awards	Best Actor (Indigenous)	Won
2012	Best of Nollywood Awards	Best Actor (Hausa)	Won
2013	9th Africa Movie Academy Awards	Best Supporting Actor	Nominated
2013	Nigeria Entertainment Awards	Best Actor	Won
2013	Best of Nollywood Awards	Best Actor (Hausa)	Won
2013	City People Entertainment Awards	Kannywood Face	Won
2014	Kannywood Awards	Best Actor	Won
2014	Leadership Awards	Best Artiste	Won
2014	City People Entertainment Awards	Best Actor	Won
2014	City People Entertainment Awards	Kannywood Face	Won
2014	Arewa Music and Movie Awards	Pride of Kannywood	Won
2014	Arewa Music and Movie Awards	Best Actor (Popular)	Won
2015	19th African Film Awards	Most Outstanding Actor	Won
2015	Best of Nollywood Awards	Best Actor (Hausa)	Won
2015	Kannywood Awards	Best Actor (Popular)	Won
2015	City People Entertainment Awards	Kannywood Personality	Won
2016	Best of Nollywood Awards	Best Actor (Hausa)	Won
2016	Arewa Music and Movie Awards	Best Actor	Won
2016	Kannywood Awards	Best Actor	Nominated
2016	City People Entertainment Awards	Kannywood Face	Nominated
2016	Arewa Creative Industry Awards	Entertainment Award	Won
2016	Wazobia FM's COWA Awards	Excellent Entertainer	Won
2017	Northern Nigeria Peace Awards	Best Actor	Won
2017	City People Entertainment Awards	Kannywood Face	Won
2017	City People Entertainment Awards	Best Actor	Nominated
2017	Best of Nollywood Awards	Special Recognition Award	Won
2021	Northern Film Makers	Best Actor	Won
2023	Nollywood Europe Golden Awards	Best Actor	Won
