= Kannywood Awards =

- Awarded for: Outstanding Achievement in Kannywood
- Country: Nigeria
- Presented by: MTN Nigeria
- First award: 2014
- Final award: 2015

Kannywood Awards is a former film event presented by Kannywood Guild of Actors honouring outstanding achievement in the Kannywood Movie Industry. It was first held in 2014, in Kano State. The 2015 Kannywood Awards, honouring movies of 2014, was held at NAF Conference Center, Abuja, FCT, on January 31, 2015. Emir of Gumel from Jigawa State, Ahmad Sarari was the chief host.

== Ceremonies ==
- 2014 Kannywood Awards
- 2015 Kannywood Awards

== Categories ==
As of 2014, Kannywood Awards have approximately 21 categories which are listed below.

POPULAR CHOICE AWARD

- Best Actor
- Best Actress
- Best Director
- Best Comedian

JURORS AWARD

- Best Film
- Best Actor
- Best Actress
- Best Director
- Best Supporting Actor
- Best Supporting Actress
- Best Comedian
- Best Cinematography
- Best Villain
- Best Costume
- Best Make-Up
- Best Script
- Best Child Actor
- Best Set Design
- Best Music
- Best Visual Effect
- Best Sound
- Best Editor:
