= Wura season 1 =

Wura
- Season 1
- Starring: Scarlet Gomez; Yomi Fash Lanso; Ray Adeka; Iremide Adeoye; Toluwani George; Ego Iheanacho; Martha Ehinome; Lanre Adediwura; Aweodein Adeola; Miracle Gabriel; Casey Edema; Rhoda Albert
- No. of episodes: 100

Release
- Original network: Showmax
- Original release: 23 January – 13 July 2023

Season chronology
- Next → Season 2

The first season of the Showmax Original soap opera series Wura premiered on 23 January 2023, and concluded on 13 July 2023, with a total of 100 episodes. Shortly after Wura hit 50 episodes, the producers spoke with The Guardian Saturday Magazine, about its plan for the first season to reach over 200 episodes., it was announced that Wura would have only 4 episodes released from Monday to Thursday for 25 weeks. On 13 July 2023, the Showmax announced the end of season 1, shortly after the release of the 100 episodes "Blabbermouth". On 13 November 2023, showmax announce the release date for its second season.

== Plot ==
Wura tells the story of Wura Amoo-Adeleke, the ruthless CEO of the fictional Frontline Gold Mine, and the perfect wife, a mother of two, who will do anything to maintain her ground in the gold mining industry. In her family, Wura is faultless and a saint, but when it comes to running her business, she becomes that ruthless lady, who doesn't care whose ox is gored in her path to get what she wants.

In the Iperindo community of Osun State, where Wura's mining business is located in Iperindo town, live poverty-stricken residents, many of whom work at the mine, including the Kuti family. The Kuti family, consisting of Pa Kuti, Iyabo Kuti, and their children, Olumide, Ebunoluwa, and Tumininu the adopted child, been found close to a river as a baby by her late adoptive father, Pa Kuti.

== Cast and characters ==
=== Main ===
- Scarlet Gomez as Wura Amoo-Adeleke
- Yomi Fash Lanso as Anthony Adeleke
- Ray Adeka as Jejeloye “Jeje” Amoo
- Iremide Adeoye as Lolu Adeleke
- Toluwani George as Eve Adeleke
- Oluwaseyi Akinsola as Femi
- Ropo Ewenla as Olusegun “Pa” Kuti
- Ego Iheanacho as Iyabo Kuti
- Martha Ehinome as Tumininu “Tumi” Kuti
- Lanre Adediwura as Olumide “Cobra” Kuti

=== Supporting ===
- Carol King as Grace Adeleke
- Tersy Akpata as Ewa
- Olawale Gold as Detective Kolapo
- Rhoda Albert as Paulina
- Muyiwa Donald as Kazeem
- Toluwanimi Adekanmbi as Bisola
- Jare Martins as Chief Popoola
- Taiwo Ibikunle as Biggie
- Ayorinde Babatope as Percy
- Misi Molu as Omolara
- Odufeso Olajumoke as Young Wura
- Obadare Akinade as Young Olusegun
- Adekunle David as Baby Tumi
- Chukwuebuka Ude as Adewale
- Audrey Edak Harrison as Mandy
- Aweodein Adeola as Aunty Labake
- Modesinuola Ogundiwin as Kanyinsola Adeleke
- Casey Edema as Dimeji
- Miracle Gabriel as Ebunoluwa “Ebun” Kuti
- Mofe Stephens as Fola

== Episodes ==
| No. overall | No. in season | Title | Directed by | Written by | Original release date |
|---|---|---|---|---|---|
| 1 | 1 | "Blood and Gold" | Dimeji Ajibola | Musa Jeffery David | 23 January 2023 |
Wura's business faces financial ruin, Olusegun makes a discovery that could change the fortunes of the whole Iperindo mining community. Wura is forced to do the unthinkable to save her family.
| 2 | 2 | "The End Justifies The Means" | Dimeji Ajibola | Olumide Kuti | 24 January 2023 |
Jeje tries to stop Wura from killing Olusegun, Wura's earring is discovered missing, Jeje has to go back to the river to make sure that there's no evidence.
| 3 | 3 | "The Aftermath" | Dimeji Ajibola | Lois Truly | 25 January 2023 |
While Mandy's life is threatened, somebody sniffs around Jeje and Wura's secret. The Kutis get financial aid from a surprising donor.
| 4 | 4 | "Regrets" | Dimeji Ajibola | Isaac Ayodeji | 26 January 2023 |
Wura is the angel the Kutis need; meanwhile, Mide is having a hard time dealing with his father's death. A 'new' discovery changes Wura's fortunes.
| 5 | 5 | "Bad Omen" | Adeola Osunkojo | Esther Kokori | 30 January 2023 |
Segun Kuti's funeral ends in chaos. Lolu's two lovers meet for the first time, and Femi gets his hands on some explosive information.
| 6 | 6 | "The Game Plan" | Dimeji Ajibola | Lois Truly | 31 January 2023 |
The Kutis are the talk of the town after what Mide did at Olusegun's burial. Femi gets the upper hand on Wura and Jeje while Mide returns home.
| 7 | 7 | "Judas!" | Adeola Osunkojo | Isaac Ayodeji | 1 February 2023 |
Wura offers Labake a generous gift, Lolu calls off his affair, and Mide is in for a nasty surprise.
| 8 | 8 | "The Deal" | Adeola Osunkojo | Esther Kokori | 2 February 2023 |
Wura is on cloud nine as she unveils the gold to the press. Tumi might have found a way to save Mide's skin, while Femi puts more pressure on Wura.
| 9 | 9 | "Beggars and Choosers" | Adeola Osunkojo | Olumide Kuti | 6 February 2023 |
Wura has no choice but to help Tumi; meanwhile, Lolu breaks Femi's heart. Jeje sees something he shouldn't have.
| 10 | 10 | "Cleansed By Fire" | Adeola Osunkojo | Musa Jeffery David | 7 February 2023 |
Wura checks whether Lolu is gay, meanwhile, Tumi suspects foul play in her father's death and Jeje finds something he's been looking for a long time.
| 11 | 11 | "The Resurrection" | Yemi Morafa | Lois Truly | 8 February 2023 |
Aunty Labake collapses from the shock, believing Femi died in the shack fire. Tumi tells Mide about Olusegun's letter and that he went to see Wura before his death. Wura receives a call from the grave.
| 12 | 12 | "Find The Zombie" | Yemi Morafa | Esther Kokori | 9 February 2023 |
Mide and Tumi get the confirmation they've been waiting for. Wura and Jeje are under pressure to act fast, and Lolu has a secret.
| 13 | 13 | "Explosive" | Yemi Morafa | Olumide Kuti | 13 February 2023 |
Wura's trap backfires, Iyabo overhears some disturbing news, and Mide's convinced he knows his father's killer.
| 14 | 14 | "Nine Lives" | Yemi Morafa | Isaac Ayodeji | 14 February 2023 |
The briefcase explodes! Iyabo confronts Wura about Olusegun's death and note, and Femi hands the information to the police about the murder of Olusegun.
| 15 | 15 | "Time's Up" | Yemi Morafa | Lois Truly | 15 February 2023 |
A detective investigating Femi's case asks to speak to Wura alone. Someone tracks Femi down at the safe house, and Tumi finds out the name of her father's killer.
| 16 | 16 | "Secret Burdens" | Yemi Morafa | Musa Jeffery David | 16 February 2023 |
After she learns the truth about her father, Tumi does the unimaginable to get close to the enemy. Lolu finds comfort from the most unexpected person.
| 17 | 17 | "Granny From Hell" | Yemi Morafa | Isaac Ayodeji | 20 February 2023 |
Wura is eager for Lolu to take the next step with Mandy. Tumi and Jeje get close, and a force stronger than Wura blows in.
| 18 | 18 | "Wura" | Yemi Morafa | Musa Jeffery David | 21 February 2023 |
Jeje makes a move on Tumi, Omolara raises hell in Wura's kitchen, and Dimeji watches Tumi drive off with Jeje.
| 19 | 19 | "Undercover Mechanic" | Yemi Morafa | Olumide Kuti | 22 February 2023 |
Tumi gets a seat on the Adeleke's table, but it's not all roses and glitter, Tumi breaks into Wura's car, and gets confronted with a gun. Tumi finds a clue which could change everything.
| 20 | 20 | "The Parting Gift" | Yemi Morafa | Esther Kokori | 23 February 2023 |
Tumi draws closer to Wura and Jeje, Omolara reveals why she is making Wura's life hell. Mide discovers from Dimeji that Tumi was with Jeje, not Ewa.
| 21 | 21 | "A Shot In The Arm" | Yemi Morafa | Isaac Ayodeji | 27 February 2023 |
Wura kills another Kuti family member, Paulina unknowingly gives Mide a dangerous plan.
| 22 | 22 | "The Sweetest Day" | Yemi Morafa | Lois Truly | 28 February 2023 |
Wura's anniversary night turns into her worst nightmare, Mide and Tumi have evidence to lock up Wura for murder, Jeje and Tumi's union gets serious every minute.
| 23 | 23 | "A Test Of Faith" | Yemi Morafa | Lois Truly | 1 March 2023 |
Mide is punished when he tries to provide the police with proof. Jeje is faced with an impossible task.
| 24 | 24 | "The Gown" | Yemi Morafa | Esther Kokori | 2 March 2023 |
Wura wants Tumi dead. Tumi reveals to Iyabo and Ebun that Olusegun's death wasn't an accident. He was murdered by Wura Adeleke, and Tumi tells Tony that Wura killed her father.
| 25 | 25 | "A Just Man" | Yemi Morafa | Musa Jeffery David | 6 March 2023 |
Tumi gives Tony an ultimatum. The Kuti's wait with bated breath to see if anything will happen to Wura.
| 26 | 26 | "A Cloud Of Witnesses" | Adeola Osunkojo | Esther Kokori | 7 March 2023 |
Tumi breathlessly delivers Wura's fate. Jeje is no match for disgruntled miners, and Tony and Jeje go head-to-head.
| 27 | 27 | "Prison Strangler" | Adeola Osunkojo | Esther Kokori | 8 March 2023 |
Lolu figures out exactly how Segun Kuti was murdered. Wura fights for her life, Dimeji receives a surprising response when he confesses his feeling to Tumi.
| 28 | 28 | "The Kiss Of Life" | Adeola Osunkojo | Lois Truly | 9 March 2023 |
Wura finds out who's trying to kill her. Dimeji has had enough of Iperindo. Tumi's love for Dimeji saves him.
| 29 | 29 | "The Later" | Adeola Osunkojo | Olumide Kuti | 13 March 2023 |
Wura tells Jeje about her deepest, darkest secret. Lolu finds the missing letter and is shocked by the contents.
| 30 | 30 | "Bitter Freedom" | Adeola Osunkojo | Esther Kokori | 14 March 2023 |
The Kuti's learn about the person who killed Segun. Tony and Wura's marriage is on the rocks, and Tumi and Dimeji pave a way into each other's hearts.
| 31 | 31 | "Phoenix" | Adeola Osunkojo | Isaac Ayodeji | 15 March 2023 |
Tumi suffers at Wura's fierce hand. A woman from Jeje's past makes a grand entrance.
| 32 | 32 | "Rage" | Adeola Osunkojo | Lois Truly | 16 March 2023 |
Jeje wants Omolara gone. Mide spends his mother's money on an old friend.
| 33 | 33 | "Dark Desire" | Dimeji Ajibola | Lois Truly | 20 March 2023 |
Will Jeje follow through in chasing his own mother out the house? Omolara falls. Will Mide cave in and return to crime.
| 34 | 34 | "The Dilemma" | Dimeji Ajibola | Musa Jeffery David | 21 March 2023 |
Mide finds himself wooed back into the world of crime. Jeje is worried when his mother doesn't come back home like she was supposed to.
| 35 | 35 | "Backstabbing" | Dimeji Ajibola | Musa Jeffery David | 22 March 2023 |
The Kutis are convinced their bad spell is over with their new blessing. Omolara's true colours are revealed. Mide is faced with a life changing temptation.
| 36 | 36 | "A Dead Woman’s Curse" | Dimeji Ajibola | Musa Jeffery David | 23 March 2023 |
Omolara begs for forgiveness, Kazeem warns Mide to stay away from Percy, Wura asks Labake to do some snooping.
| 37 | 37 | "Fighting Biggie" | Dimeji Ajibola | Musa Jeffery David | 27 March 2023 |
Iyabo finds a dangerous criminal standing in her house, Kazeem and Omolara are forced to hide together. Percy plots a life-threatening scheme.
| 38 | 38 | "Caught Out" | Dimeji Ajibola | Esther Kokori | 28 March 2023 |
Wura is thrilled to discover proof that Omolara is lying. Mide and Percy advance their criminal plan with Iyabo's help.
| 39 | 39 | "Trapped" | Dimeji Ajibola | Olumide Kuti | 29 March 2023 |
Mide's new business has him locked-up in a storeroom; meanwhile, Wura is forced to grovel to Omolara. Percy and Mide are reunited with their worst enemy. Omolara has her eye on a new toy-boy.
| 40 | 40 | "Dirty Guns" | Adeola Osunkojo | Lois Truly | 30 March 2023 |
Mide and Percy almost meet their maker. Kazeem saves lives. Omolara wins Wura again.
| 41 | 41 | "Learn From The Cockroaches" | Adeola Osunkojo | Isaac Ayodeji | 3 April 2023 |
Jeje learns that the woman he loves is in trouble. Mide and Percy reunite with a deadly friend, and Omolara plays her final trump card.
| 42 | 42 | "To Kill A Mocking Woman" | Dimeji Ajibola | Esther Kokori | 4 April 2023 |
How will Wura stop Omolara from pulling her strings? Mide has no choice but to let Biggie in on the heist.
| 43 | 43 | "Deadly Poison" | Dimeji Ajibola | Olumide Kuti | 5 April 2023 |
Mide and Percy give a performance of their life. Biggie insists it's full steam ahead. Omolara has another fit, could this be the end?
| 44 | 44 | "Frozen" | Dimeji Ajibola | Musa Jeffery David | 6 April 2023 |
Omolara's condition is worse than what anyone expected. Mide's loyalty to his family is challenged.
| 45 | 45 | "Battle" | Dimeji Ajibola | Musa Jeffery David | 10 April 2023 |
Things go horribly with the heist and Mide endangers someone he cares about. Wura is beside herself as Tony decides to walk into the line of fire.
| 46 | 46 | "Cleopatra" | Dimeji Ajibola | Isaac Ayodeji | 11 April 2023 |
Wura finally manages to get rid of Omolara. While everyone thinks he is safely in prison. Biggie strikes hard.
| 47 | 47 | "Powerful Families" | Adeola Osunkojo | Esther Kokori | 12 April 2023 |
Chief Popoola gives Wura a tempting offer. Biggie strikes back at Mide.
| 48 | 48 | "The Botched Rescue" | Adeola Osunkojo | Olumide Kuti | 13 April 2023 |
Lolu is still overwhelmed by his life taking a left turn. Tumi's plan doesn't go as expected and Mide is under pressure to deliver.
| 49 | 49 | "Big Surprises" | Adeola Osunkojo | Olumide Kuti | 17 April 2023 |
Tumi is caught Mide's web of lies. Mandy becomes Wura's pawn. There is a new thief out to steal gold.
| 50 | 50 | "The Safe Cracker" | Adeola Osunkojo | Olumide Kuti | 18 April 2023 |
Lolu is still overwhelmed by his life taking a left turn. Tumi's plan doesn't go as expected and Mide is under pressure to deliver.
| 51 | 51 | "A Good Run of Bad Luck" | Adeola Osunkojo | Isaac Ayodeji | 19 April 2023 |
Wura is determined to see that Mandy and Lolu's wedding goes ahead. Eve and Lolu lust over Adewale. Mide may have sealed Ebun's fate when he gives Biggies the fake gold.
| 52 | 52 | "Shorts Fired" | Yemi Morafa | Olumide Kuti | 20 April 2023 |
A deadly shooting at the river leaves the Kuti's weeping. Wura hangs her future on Lolu marrying Mandy, while Lolu and Adewale discover they have mutual admiration for each other.
| 53 | 53 | "Pressure" | Adeola Osunkojo | Esther Kokori | 24 April 2023 |
Ebun breaks her first law in the presence of police. Chief Popoola amps up the heat for Wura. lolu suffocates in his home.
| 54 | 54 | "The Bust" | Yemi Morafa | Lois Truly | 25 April 2023 |
Detective Kolapo interrogates Mide about the illegal gun found on the scene. The screws tighten Lolu as Adeleke uncles arrive for bride price negotiations. Wura offers Adewale a permanent position at the mine.
| 55 | 55 | "Revelations" | Yemi Morafa | Musa Jeffery David | 26 April 2023 |
Adewale reveals something shocking to Wura's family, Iyabo suddenly has trouble remembering details of her life.
| 56 | 56 | "Shaky Ground" | Yemi Morafa | Esther Kokori | 27 April 2023 |
Iyabo proves that she is not well as she claimed. Lolu's backstabbing comes back to haunt him. Wura is hot and bothered about Adewale.
| 57 | 57 | "The Prince of Egypt" | Yemi Morafa | Isaac Ayodeji | 1 May 2023 |
Iyabo's condition worsens but Mide downplays it, insisting this shouldn't leave the walls of their house. Lolu does something that will leave mercy people hurt and angry.
| 58 | 58 | "Fractured" | Yemi Morafa | Musa Jeffery David | 2 May 2023 |
Lolu and Mandy's relationship is on the rocks.
| 59 | 59 | "The Coat" | Yemi Morafa | Olumide Kuti | 3 May 2023 |
Mandy wants a private investigator to look into Lolu. The Kuti's hit a new speed bump.
| 60 | 60 | "Not so Perfect" | Adeola Osunkojo | Musa Jeffery David | 4 May 2023 |
Ewa has a plan to heal Iyabo. Wura sends Jeje to find out what Lolu is really up to.
| 61 | 61 | "To Wed or Not To Wed" | Adeola Osunkojo | Olumide Kuti | 8 May 2023 |
Chief shuts down Frontline Gold Mine. Iyabo has some hurful news for Tumi.
| 62 | 62 | "Going No Where Fast" | Adeola Osunkojo | Olumide Kuti | 9 May 2023 |
Lolu and Adewale decide to run away together. Mide and Tumi are devastated when Iyabo disappears.
| 63 | 63 | "Love The One You're With" | Adeola Osunkojo | Olumide Kuti | 10 May 2023 |
Everyone wonders what is wrong with Lolu, as he picks up the pieces of his broken heart. Tumi and Mide race to save the person they love most.
| 64 | 64 | "The Colour of Fear" | Adeola Osunkojo | Isaac Ayodeji | 11 May 2023 |
Lolu decides the fate of the wedding. Iyabo is convinced her troubles are behind her. Mide and Paulina reignite their passion.
| 65 | 65 | "A Wedding and a Funeral" | Adeola Osunkojo | Uchenna Ugwu | 15 May 2023 |
The wedding of the year arrives but a terror swoops down on the Adeleke mansion.
| 66 | 66 | "The Whole Truth" | Adeola Osunkojo | Musa Jeffery David | 16 May 2023 |
Eve's revelation divides the family. Dimeji's two lovers end up in the same room.
| 67 | 67 | "Scenes From Marriage" | Adeola Osunkojo | Isaac Ayodeji | 17 May 2023 |
Will Tony and Wura's marriage survive Lolu's suicide attempt? And will Tumi finally make a move on with Dimeji? No one has heart to tell Mandy the truth about her man's sexuality.
| 68 | 68 | "Just Desserts" | Yemi Morafa | Lois Truly | 18 May 2023 |
Wura receives mercy from an unlikely source. Tumi and Dimeji are together but he has to deal with Bisola
| 69 | 69 | "Help Me, Lord!" | Yemi Morafa | Esther Kokori | 22 May 2023 |
Wura turns to God as a last resort to save Lolu. Kazeem puts doubts in Tumi's mind about Dimeji. Bad news from the hospital regarding Lolu.
| 70 | 70 | "Flatline" | Yemi Morafa | Esther Kokori | 23 May 2023 |
A grieving Wura and Tony must decide Lolu's fate while Tumi refuses to let her brother control her relationship with Dimeji.
| 71 | 71 | "The Come Back" | Yemi Morafa | Olumide Kuti | 24 May 2023 |
Dimeji goes all out for Tumi's affection. The old Wura reemerges and it's not pretty.
| 72 | 72 | "Home Coming" | Adeola Osunkojo | Uchenna Ugwu | 25 May 2023 |
Wura is annoyed as her least favorite person comes to her house unannounced. Jeje's heart breaks when he sees Tumi in the arms of another.
| 73 | 73 | "Family Bonds" | Yemi Morafa | Uchenna Ugwu | 29 May 2023 |
Mide kidnaps an innocent man. Kanyinsola has a few choice words for the Adeleke family.
| 74 | 74 | "A World of Bad Girls" | Yemi Morafa | Isaac Ayodeji | 30 May 2023 |
Wura's future could get stolen from her. Jeje fights dirty for the woman he wants. Kanyinsola feels betrayed by her family.
| 75 | 75 | "Thick As Thieves" | Yemi Morafa | Musa Jeffery David | 31 May 2023 |
Wura's meeting with the Chairlady takes a nasty turn and Jeje surprises the Kuti family. Kanyinsola's luck runs out.
| 76 | 76 | "Blast From The Past" | Adeola Osunkojo | Uchenna Ugwu | 1 June 2023 |
Tumi finds out the real reason why Dimeji broke up with her. Wura and Tony do not see eye-to-eye. Kanyinsola discovers she's not the only one who hates Wura.
| 77 | 77 | "Double Edged Sword" | Adeola Osunkojo | Lois Truly | 5 June 2023 |
Tumi finds a way to get back with Dimeji. Wura drops the charges against Kanyinsola, not realizing the girl is out to destroy her.
| 78 | 78 | "The Unwanted" | Adeola Osunkojo | Olumide Kuti | 6 June 2023 |
Several people are gunning to destroy Tumi and Dimeji's love. Wura is forced to host an unwanted guest.
| 79 | 79 | "The Tag-Team" | Adeola Osunkojo | Musa Jeffery David | 7 June 2023 |
Jeje is bummed when he sees something that leaves him heartbroken. Dimeji gets arrested. Wura's oldest enemy is back.
| 80 | 80 | "Ghost Don't Die" | Adeola Osunkojo | Isaac Ayodeji | 8 June 2023 |
Tension explodes in the Kuti house. Wura comes face to face with someone from her past.
| 81 | 81 | "Past Comes Calling" | Adeola Osunkojo | Esther Kokori | 12 June 2023 |
Wura's past comes back to haunt her in the form of Fola. Jeje makes sure that Dimeji doesn't get released from jail anytime soon.
| 82 | 82 | "Free At Last" | Ben Chiadika | Musa Jeffery David | 13 June 2023 |
Wura finds the perfect way to get rid of Fola. While Tumi refuses to leave the station until she sees Dimeji.
| 83 | 83 | "Second Changes" | Ben Chiadika | Uchenna Ugwu | 14 June 2023 |
Kanyinsola beats Wura at her own game. Jaje weaves a plan to ruin Dimeji.
| 84 | 84 | "Blurt Out" | Ben Chiadika | Olumide Kuti | 15 June 2023 |
Wura gets more paranoid with Fola sticking around. Dimeji has a big surprise for Tumi.
| 85 | 85 | "U-Turn" | Ben Chiadika | Musa Jeffery David | 19 June 2023 |
Tumi is still high from her night of lovemaking, but her day takes an unexpected turn. Wura makes a startling discovery about one of the people in the house.
| 86 | 86 | "Cat and Mouse" | Ben Chiadika | Lois Truly | 20 June 2023 |
Tumi makes a move on someone. Detective Kolapo has a mysterious gift for Wura. Wura sneaks two steps ahead of Kanyin.
| 87 | 87 | "A Gleam of Hope" | Ben Chiadika | Esther Kokori | 21 June 2023 |
Dimeji meets his son. Kanyinsola and Fola’s plan comes together. Jeje declares his love for Tumi and is in for a surprise.
| 88 | 88 | "Walking on Fire" | Ben Chiadika | Isaac Ayodeji | 22 June 2023 |
Wura and Jeje are out for their enemies’ blood. Tumi’s plan to reconnect with Dimeji blows up on her face.
| 89 | 89 | "Two Can Play" | Yemi Morafa | Esther Kokori | 26 June 2023 |
Dimeji proposes again. Kanyinsola and Fola lay a trap for Wura.
| 90 | 90 | "Nightmare" | Yemi Morafa | Esther Kokori | 27 June 2023 |
Tumi wants to fight to be with Dimeji. Tony gets a mysterious but worrying message.
| 91 | 91 | "A Call To Arms" | Yemi Morafa | Isaac Ayodeji | 28 June 2023 |
Wura decides to draw a line in the sand for Kanyinsola. Tumi has to live with her new, painful reality.
| 92 | 92 | "Rightfully Yours or Something Like It" | Yemi Morafa | Esther Kokori | 29 June 2023 |
Ewa confronts Dimeji for breaking Tumi's heart. Kanyinsola and Fola finally catch a break in their fight against Wura.
| 93 | 93 | "Home Sweet Enemy" | Yemi Morafa | Lois Truly | 3 July 2023 |
Ewa tries to cheer Tumi up. The bomb squad descends on the Adeleke home.
| 94 | 94 | "Loggerheads" | Yemi Morafa | Musa Jeffery David | 4 July 2023 |
Fola has reached his limit with Wura. Bisola tightens the leash around Dimeji.
| 95 | 95 | "Too Late" | Yemi Morafa | Yemi Morafa | 5 July 2023 |
Tumi stops Dimeji before the wedding to tell him how she feels. Fola and Kanyinsola fall into WURA’s trap.
| 96 | 96 | "Closure" | Yemi Morafa | Olumide Kuti | 6 July 2023 |
Tumi experiences the ultimate agony and Kanyinsola gets her power back.
| 97 | 97 | "Battle Lines" | Yemi Morafa | Lois Truly | 10 July 2023 |
Kanyin plans her revenge, while Wura plots her next move. Dimeji adjust to his new life with his wife. Tumi breaks Jeje’s heart again.
| 98 | 98 | "The Witch and a Snake" | Yemi Morafa | Isaac Ayodeji | 11 July 2023 |
Paulina struggles to accept that Dimeji has left Iperindo. Kanyinsola puts her plan to get rid of Wura in motion. Will she succeed?
| 99 | 99 | "The Curse of the Serpent" | Yemi Morafa | Isaac Ayodeji | 12 July 2023 |
Wura kills a venomous enemy. Paulina’s tragic past ruins her party.
| 100 | 100 | "Blabbermouth" | Yemi Morafa | Esther Kokori | 13 July 2023 |
Paulina starts unraveling. Kanyinsola strikes a deal that could see her defeat Wura, sooner than expected.

== Production ==
=== Filming ===
Principal photography of the series set location in Iperindo, a community in Atakunmosa East local government in Osun State, a state in southwestern Nigeria. The community discovered gold first in 1945. In 2017, its gold deposit was evaluated at $5 billion. According to Nigerian Entertainment Today author Anjolaoluwa Abiosun, “its community is plagued with poverty and a lack of basic amenities, including access to potable water, motorable roads, and functioning health facilities”.

On 22 April 2023, shortly after Wura hit 50 episodes, the producers spoke with The Guardian Saturday Magazine, about its plan for the first season to reach over 200 episodes. On 13 June 2023, following the release of episode 82 in its 1st season, one of Tinsel directors, Ben Chiadika joined the production team, led by Rogers Ofime as a director.

=== Casting ===
The cast was reported when season 1 began, with a line-up of Scarlet Gomez, Yomi Fash Lanso, Ray Adeka, Iremide Adeoye, Toluwani George, Oluwaseyi Akinsola, Ropo Ewenla, Ego Ihenacho, Martha Ehinome, and Lanre Adediwura as main cast. With Carol King, Tersy Akpata, Olawale Gold, Rhoda Albert, Muyiwa Donald, Toluwanimi Adekanmbi, Jare Martins, Taiwo Ibikunle, Ayorinde Babatope, Misi Molu, Odufeso Olajumoke, Obadare Akinade, Adekunle David, Chukwuebuka Ude, Audrey Edak Harrison, Aweodein Adeola, Modesinuola Ogundiwin, Casey Edema, Miracle Gabriel, and Mofe Stephens as supporting cast.

== Premiere and release ==
On 19 January 2023, The Ọọ̀ni of Ifẹ̀ (King of Ife), Oba Adeyeye Enitan Ogunwusi hosted a private screening at his palace of the first few episodes of the Showmax original series in Osun State. The King wives, Olori Tobi Philips Ogunwusi, Olori Aderonke Ademiluyi Ogunwusi, Olori Afolashade Ogunwusi, and Wura stars Scarlet Gomez, Yomi Fash-Lanso and Ego Iheanacho, alongside other cast and crew members where in attendance.

The king at the official premiere, described the show, saying: “The show was very well put together and professionally done”, and added to the remark by saying: “I’m very impressed and I rarely get impressed with things. I love the naturalistic effect of the series. It premiered to me at the palace and I could barely find any faults. I have to give the entire crew some major credit. The story is very well scripted and that’s the typical determination you find in any Nigerian. It’s a show that will impact society not only in Ife. I look forward to watching the rest of it because it’s very obvious that it’s a series that will address a lot of societal ills and will engage the citizenry as a whole.”
