= Wura season 2 =

Wura
- Season 2
- Starring: Scarlet Gomez; Yomi Fash Lanso; Ray Adeka; Iremide Adeoye; Toluwani George; Ego Iheanacho; Martha Ehinome; Lanre Adediwura; Aweodein Adeola; Modesinuola Ogundiwin; Mofe Stephens; Misi Molu; Miracle Gabriel; Casey Edema; Rhoda Albert
- No. of episodes: 100

Release
- Original network: Showmax
- Original release: 4 December 2023 – 23 May 2024

Season chronology
- ← Previous; Season 1 Next → Season 3

The second season of the Nigerian soap opera series Wura was ordered on 13 November 2023, by Showmax. The second season began streaming on 4 December 2023, with 100 episodes like the previous season, and concluded on 23 May 2024, starring Scarlet Gomez, Yomi Fash Lanso, Ray Adeka, Iremide Adeoye, Ego Iheanacho, Martha Ehinome, Lanre Adediwura, Miracle Gabriel, Tersy Akpata, Aweodein Adeola, Modesinuola Ogundiwin, Casey Edema, and Mofe Stephens.

== Plot ==
The season follows up her feud with Kanyinsola and Fola, taking a new turn as Wura uses Tumininu to gain back the trust of the Iperindo community. Wuraola continues to do whatever it takes to enrich her pocket and keep her image clean as a gold-mining magnate, regardless of her evil plans.

== Cast and characters ==
=== Main ===
- Scarlet Gomez as Wura Amoo-Adeleke
- Yomi Fash Lanso as Anthony Adeleke
- Ray Adeka as Jejeloye “Jeje” Amoo
- Iremide Adeoye as Lolu Adeleke
- Toluwani George as Eve Adeleke
- Ego Iheanacho as Iyabo Kuti
- Martha Ehinome as Tumininu “Tumi” Kuti
- Lanre Adediwura as Olumide “Cobra” Kuti
- Aweodein Adeola as Aunty Labake
- Modesinuola Ogundiwin as Kanyinsola Adeleke
- Casey Edema as Dimeji
- Miracle Gabriel as Ebunoluwa “Ebun” Kuti
- Mofe Stephens as Fola

=== Supporting ===
- Carol King as Grace Adeleke
- Tersy Akpata as Ewa
- Olawale Gold as Detective Kolapo
- Rhoda Albert as Paulina
- Muyiwa Donald as Kazeem
- Toluwanimi Adekanmbi as Bisola
- Jare Martins as Chief Popoola
- Taiwo Ibikunle as Biggie
- Ayorinde Babatope as Percy
- Misi Molu as Omolara
- Odufeso Olajumoke as Young Wura
- Obadare Akinade as Young Olusegun
- Adekunle David as Baby Tumi
- Chukwuebuka Ude as Adewale
- Audrey Edak Harrison as Mandy

== Episodes ==
No. overall	No. in season	Title	Directed by	Written by	Original release date
101	1	"Shots Fired"	Ben Chiadika	Olumide Kuti	4 December 2023
102	2	"The Noose Tightens"	Ben Chiadika	Lois Truly	5 December 2023
Fola stares death in the face. Lolu unwittingly gives Kanyin an idea that could get her closer to destroying Wura.
103	3	"Gold Rush"	Ben Chiadika	Isaac Ayodeji	6 December 2023
Paulina demands justice. Detective Mark has Kanyinsola against the wall as the clock for her gold heist ticks down.
104	4	"Lost and Found"	Ben Chiadika	Esther Kokori	7 December 2023
Paulina goes to extremes to make an old enemy pay. It's a day of reckoning for Kanyinsola, who is expected to deliver the gold.
105	5	"Road to Perdition"	Yemi Morafa	Esther Kokori	11 December 2023
Kanyinsola prepares for an intimate time with Detective Mark. Fola finally gets a face-to-face meeting with Dimeji and Paulina, but it’s not what he expected.
106	6	"First Kill"	Ben Chiadika	Musa Jeffery David	12 December 2023
Iyabo has perfect timing. Someone loses a limb in the Adeleke mansion.
107	7	"A Deer Caught in The Headlights"	Ben Chiadika	Musa Jeffery David	13 December 2023
Kanyinsola's crime tortures her as everyone searches for Mark. Iyabo announces that Fola will be moving in.
108	8	"The New Race"	Ben Chiadika	Isaac Ayodeji	14 December 2023
Detective Kolapo warns Jeje that Iyabo and Fola are still snooping around. Wura welcomes a new employee to Frontline Gold Mine, but does she know who she’s allowing into her life?
109	9	"Missing Witness"	Ben Chiadika	Uchenna Ugwu	18 December 2023
Fola and Iyabo's search for the key witness reaches a dead end. Detective Kolapo is missing one key evidence. Tony discovers Bose right outside his bedroom door.
110	10	"Breaking Boundaries"	Ben Chiadika & Philemon Maigari	Esther Kokori	19 December 2023
Mide believes Iyabo is in grave danger. Aunty Labake is on high alert after witnessing some scandalous behaviour from Bose.
111	11	"Dangerous Territories"	Ben Chiadika	Esther Kokori	20 December 2023
Tony’s mind crosses into dangerous territory. Fola finally finds the man he’s been looking for, but there’s a surprise waiting.
112	12	TBA	Ben Chiadika & Philemon Maigari	Olumide Kuti	21 December 2023
Jeje is horrified when he learns that Wura’s secret could be revealed. The Adelekes realise that something is off with Bose.
113	13	TBA	Ben Chiadika	Isaac Ayodeji	25 December 2023
Mufu starts to wish he had stayed at the police station where it’s safe. Kanyinsola discovers Tony’s secret.
114	14	TBA	Ben Chiadika	Musa Jeffery David	26 December 2023
A guilt-ridden Paulina and Dimeji come face-to-face with Fola. Kanyinsola continues with her plot to get Bose and Tony together.
115	15	TBA	Ben Chiadika	Musa Jeffery David	27 December 2023
Fola's luck runs out. Tony is in for a whole new world of pain as the tension between him and Bose grows.
116	16	TBA	Ben Chiadika	Uchenna Ugwu	28 December 2023
Rambo struggles to convince everyone he's changed. Tony realises he needs to get rid of Bose soon, but is he turning to the right person for help?
117	17	TBA	Adeola Osunkojo & Ben Chiadika	Olumide Kuti	1 January 2024
We see a new side to Rambo, and Tony worries about his children’s safety when he discovers some disturbing information about Bose.
118	18	TBA	Adeola Osunkojo	Esther Kokori	2 January 2024
Tony’s scheme to handle Bose backfires. Rambo and Mide are at loggerheads about the new business.
119	19	TBA	Adeola Osunkojo & Ben Chiadika	Lois Truly	3 January 2024
Mide and Rambo take on an impossibly large order. Bose gives Tony no choice but to sleep with her.
120	20	TBA	Adeola Osunkojo	Musa Jeffery David	4 January 2024
Mide and Rambo hear about a deal that could change their lives. Tony is skating on thin ice where his marriage is concerned.
121	21	TBA	Adeola Osunkojo & Ben Chiadika	Musa Jeffery David	8 January 2024
Tony celebrates the end of an uncomfortable chapter. Mide and Rambo find themselves in a situation that could cost them their contract.
122	22	TBA	Unknown	Unknown	9 January 2024
Mide and Rambo fight over the bakery. Bose has a shocking ultimatum for Tony.
123	23	TBA	Unknown	Unknown	10 January 2024
Mide stops Rambo from doing something he'll regret. Jeje confronts Tony about the suspicious behaviour he's witnessed in the house.
124	24	TBA	Unknown	Unknown	11 January 2024
Tony races to get Bose out of his house before she exposes him to Wura, but will he make it in time? Mide and Rambo get an angel investor.
125	25	TBA	Unknown	Unknown	15 January 2024
Just when Tony celebrates his victory, Bose pulls the rug from under his feet. Meanwhile, Mide and Rambo's business deal hangs in the balance.
126	26	TBA	Adeola Osunkojo	Lois Truly	16 January 2024
Rambo and Mide are under pressure to do something for the greater good. Wura gets to hear the sordid details of things she’d rather not hear.
127	27	TBA	Adeola Osunkojo	Uchenna Ugwu	17 January 2024
What will Wura do with Bose's confession? Rambo and Mide discover the hard way that money makes the world go round.
128	28	TBA	Adeola Osunkojo	Uchenna Ugwu	18 January 2024
Tony and Wura's marriage deteriorates further, and Rambo wants to take drastic steps to protect the bakery.
129	29	TBA	Adeola Osunkojo & Philemon Maigari	Esther Kokori	22 January 2024
Wura makes an extreme decision on how to handle Tony. All of Iperindo show up for the bakery.
130	30	TBA	Adeola Osunkojo	Olumide Kuti	23 January 2024
The bakery experiences another setback and Winifred plants dangerous seeds in Wura’s mind.
131	31	TBA	Adeola Osunkojo & Philemon Maigari	Lois Truly	24 January 2024
Tony finally admits the truth, but Wura already has another plan in motion. Something goes wrong at the bakery.
132	32	TBA	Adeola Osunkojo & Philemon Maigari	Lois Truly	25 January 2024
Bose is blindsided by Wura's plans for Tony. Rambo and Mide's bakery receives a surprise lifeline.
133	33	TBA	Adeola Osunkojo & Philemon Maigari	Musa Jeffery David	29 January 2024
Iyabo confronts the warder for exploiting Mide and Rambo. Jeje races against time to save Tony's life. Rambo has an idea to get them out of their financial mess.
134	34	TBA	Adeola Osunkojo & Philemon Maigari	Isaac Ayodeji	30 January 2024
Wura finally gets her way to get everything off her chest. Mide finds himself back where he started.
135	35	TBA	Adeola Osunkojo & Philemon Maigari	Musa Jeffery David	31 January 2024
The Adelekes receive news of Bose's death. Mide and Rambo abandon the stolen car and proceed on foot, but will they make it with the entire police force after them?
136	36	TBA	Adeola Osunkojo & Philemon Maigari	Isaac Ayodeji	1 February 2024
The Kuti household is humiliated in their home. Tony and Wura escape the city.
137	37	TBA	Adeola Osunkojo & Philemon Maigari	Esther Kokori	5 February 2024
Mide makes a shocking confession to his family. Just as the Adeleke kids thought Lolu's party was going well, everything comes to a screeching halt.
138	38	TBA	Adeola Osunkojo & Philemon Maigari	Uchenna Ugwu	6 February 2024
Kanyinsola's party turns into something kinky. Iyabo chooses one child and loses another.
139	39	"Olumide Kuti"	Adeola Osunkojo & Philemon Maigari	Olumide Kuti	7 February 2024
The Adeleke kids wake up to a shocking scene. Tumi has to make some hard choices as she continues her campaign against Mide.
140	40	TBA	Adeola Osunkojo	Musa Jeffery David	8 February 2024
Tumi finds herself in a very dangerous situation. The Adeleke kids scramble to find the people who robbed them, before their parents return.
141	41	TBA	Adeola Osunkojo	Lois Truly	12 February 2024
Wura walks in on an unwelcome surprise. Iyabo has her hands full with Ebun after Tumi's departure.
142	42	TBA	Adeola Osunkojo & Philemon Maigari	Isaac Ayodeji	13 February 2024
Wura is forced to follow the rules. Dimeji watches the love of his life slip away. Iyabo suffers crushing rejection.
143	43	TBA	Adeola Osunkojo	Olumide Kuti	14 February 2024
Wura unveils her plan to win over the Iperindo residents. Mide is unprepared for the humiliation he has to face while hunting for a job.
144	44	TBA	Adeola Osunkojo	Uchenna Ugwu	15 February 2024
Tumi and Jeje take a huge step forward. Tony sticks his neck out for Mide.
145	45	TBA	Unknown	Musa Jeffery David	19 February 2024
Wura finally makes the big announcement, but someone rains on her parade. Mide's first day at the mine doesn't go as well as he would have liked.
146	46	TBA	Unknown	Unknown	20 February 2024
Iyabo gives Fola an ultimatum. Jeje has long-term plans for him and Tumi.
147	47	TBA	Unknown	Unknown	21 February 2024
Kanyinsola makes a surprise appearance at the Iperindo community meeting. Tumi settles into the good life.
148	48	TBA	Unknown	Unknown	22 February 2024
Fola squeezes Wura where it hurts, and Tumi faces rejection from those she loves.
149	49	TBA	Adeola Osunkojo & Philemon Maigari	Esther Kokori	26 February 2024
A heartbroken Tumi makes a fool of herself. Fola has Wura exactly where he wants her.
150	50	TBA	Adeola Osunkojo & Philemon Maigari	Isaac Ayodeji	27 February 2024
Wura is under pressure as the strike gets worse. Tumi receives some surprising news about her future.
151	51	TBA	Adeola Osunkojo & Philemon Maigari	Uchenna Ugwu	28 February 2024
Fola is eaten up by guilt as Winifred worries that Wura might be a few steps ahead of them.
152	52	TBA	Ben Chiadika	Lois Truly	29 February 2024
Fola is trapped between a rock and five million. Jeje has a confession to make to Wura and Tony.
153	53	TBA	Ben Chiadika	Lois Truly	4 March 2024
Jeje promises to keep Tumi safe. Wura thinks her problems are over, but they have only started.
154	54	TBA	Ben Chiadika	Lois Truly	5 March 2024
Wura is close to losing her mining permit. Tumi is caught between the rich and the poor.
155	55	TBA	Ben Chiadika	Olumide Kuti	6 March 2024
All hell breaks loose at the mine, and an old friend returns to Iperindo.
156	56	TBA	Ben Chiadika	Uchenna Ugwu	7 March 2024
Omolara has some shocking news for Paulina. Wura thanks Jeje for giving her a secret weapon she can use to defeat Fola.
157	57	TBA	Adeola Osunkojo	Musa Jeffery David	11 March 2024
Mide and Iyabo are not impressed when Tumi gives them a message from Wura. An old mischievous friend does the unthinkable to the police at Paulina's bar.
158	58	TBA	Adeola Osunkojo	Musa Jeffery David	12 March 2024
The community of Iperindo receives a piece of the Frontline Gold mine. Kazeem gets a surprising offer from an old, troublesome friend.
159	59	TBA	Ben Chiadika	Lois Truly	13 March 2024
Tumi is front and centre in Wura's game. Mide gets an unusual call from someone he owes a whole lot to.
160	60	TBA	Unknown	Unknown	14 March 2024
161	61	TBA	Unknown	Unknown	18 March 2024
162	62	TBA	Unknown	Unknown	19 March 2024
163	63	TBA	Unknown	Unknown	20 March 2024
164	64	TBA	Unknown	Unknown	21 March 2024
165	65	TBA	Unknown	Unknown	25 March 2024
166	66	TBA	Unknown	Unknown	26 March 2024
167	67	TBA	Unknown	Unknown	27 March 2024
168	68	TBA	Unknown	Unknown	28 March 2024
169	69	TBA	Unknown	Unknown	1 April 2024
170	70	TBA	Unknown	Unknown	2 April 2024
171	71	TBA	Unknown	Unknown	3 April 2024
172	72	TBA	Unknown	Unknown	4 April 2024
173	73	TBA	Unknown	Unknown	8 April 2024
174	74	TBA	Unknown	Unknown	9 April 2024
175	75	TBA	Unknown	Unknown	10 April 2024
176	76	TBA	Unknown	Unknown	11 April 2024
177	77	TBA	Unknown	Unknown	15 April 2024
Jeje has some dark plans for Wura. Tony makes the Iperindo residents an offer they can't refuse.
178	78	TBA	Unknown	Unknown	16 April 2024
Wura gets the shock of her life. Detective Kolapo can't believe it when Percy approaches him with an unusual offer.
179	79	TBA	Unknown	Unknown	18 April 2024
Mide asks Paulina a life-changing question. Biggie and Tony face off.
180	80	TBA	Unknown	Unknown	18 April 2024
Paulina's diamond rings raise suspicions. The trio take one last heist.
181	81	TBA	Yemi Morafa	Uchenna Ugwu	22 April 2024
The Kuti women get the shock of their lives. Tony has never been this close to his goals, but is he willing to do what it takes to reach them?
182	82	TBA	Ben Chiadika	Uchenna Ugwu	23 April 2024
Tumi packs up and leaves the Adeleke mansion. Eve finds out something that could hurt Lolu.
183	83	TBA	Unknown	Unknown	24 April 2024
184	84	TBA	Unknown	Unknown	25 April 2024
185	85	TBA	Unknown	Unknown	29 April 2024
186	86	TBA	Unknown	Unknown	30 April 2024
187	87	TBA	Unknown	Unknown	1 May 2024
188	88	TBA	Unknown	Unknown	2 May 2024
189	89	TBA	Unknown	Unknown	6 May 2024
190	90	TBA	Unknown	Unknown	7 May 2024
191	91	TBA	Unknown	Unknown	8 May 2024
192	92	TBA	Unknown	Unknown	9 May 2024
193	93	TBA	Unknown	Unknown	13 May 2024
194	94	TBA	Unknown	Unknown	14 May 2024
195	95	TBA	Unknown	Unknown	15 May 2024
196	96	TBA	Unknown	Unknown	16 May 2024
197	97	TBA	Unknown	Unknown	20 May 2024
198	98	TBA	Unknown	Unknown	21 May 2024
199	99	TBA	Unknown	Unknown	22 May 2024
200	100	TBA	Unknown	Unknown	23 May 2024

== Production ==
=== Development ===
On 13 November 2023, showmax announced the release date for its second season to be premiered on 4 December 2023.

=== Filming ===
Principal photography of the series set location in Iperindo, a community in Atakunmosa East local government in Osun State, a state in southwestern Nigeria. The community discovered gold first in 1945. In 2017, its gold deposit was evaluated at $5 billion. According to Nigerian Entertainment Today author Anjolaoluwa Abiosun, “its community is plagued with poverty and a lack of basic amenities, including access to potable water, motorable roads, and functioning health facilities”.

Philemon Maigari joined the production team as a director on the 2nd season. Philemon debuted on episode 10, as a co-director alongside Ben Chiadika.

=== Casting ===
The second season had thirteen main roles receiving star billing, all returning from the previous season, and recurring cast from the first season Modesinuola Ogundiwin, and Mofe Stephens joined the main cast in the second season. On 3 December 2023, Showmax hosted a private screening at Obafemi Awolowo University, where they announced Modesinuola Ogundiwin, and Mofe Stephens, who had supporting roles in the first season, to join the main cast. The first few episodes of the second season premiered at the event, with Wura cast and crew members in attendance including the lead actors Scarlet Gomez, Yomi Fash-Lanso, Ray Adeka, Lanre Adediwura, Ego, and Modesinuola Ogundiwin.

== Reception ==
=== Awards and nominations ===
At the 10th Africa Magic Viewers' Choice Awards, the season received two nominations in the categories for Best Writing - TV Series and Best Series (Scripted).
