= Wura season 3 =

Wura
- Season 3
- Starring: Scarlet Gomez; Yomi Fash Lanso; Ray Adeka; Iremide Adeoye; Toluwani George; Ego Iheanacho; Martha Ehinome; Lanre Adediwura; Aweodein Adeola; Modesinuola Ogundiwin; Mofe Stephens; Misi Molu; Miracle Gabriel; Casey Edema; Rhoda Albert
- No. of episodes: 60

Release
- Original network: Showmax
- Original release: 23 September 2024 – April 15, 2025

Season chronology
- ← Previous; Season 2 Next → Season 4

The third season of the Nigerian soap opera series Wura, began streaming on 23 September 2024, and concluded with 60 episodes on 15 April 2025, starring Scarlet Gomez, Yomi Fash Lanso, Ray Adeka, Iremide Adeoye, Ego, Martha Ehinome, Lanre Adediwura, Miracle Gabriel, Tersy Akpata, Aweodein Adeola, Modesinuola Ogundiwin, Casey Edema, and Mofe Stephens.

== Plot ==
In the season, Wura pays for her ruthless action as her long-buried secrets are brought to light, while she tries to save her gold mine and family. Tumi on the other hand finds out she's not a Kuti, while Jeje loses her to her first love Dimeji after Bisola's secrets catch up with her. Dimeji meets with Jamal's biological father, Saheed, at their son's birthday, leaving his wife Bisola speechless.

== Cast and characters ==
=== Main ===
- Scarlet Gomez as Wura Amoo-Adeleke
- Yomi Fash Lanso as Anthony Adeleke
- Ray Adeka as Jejeloye “Jeje” Amoo
- Iremide Adeoye as Lolu Adeleke
- Toluwani George as Eve Adeleke
- Oluwaseyi Akinsola as Femi
- Ropo Ewenla as Olusegun “Pa” Kuti
- Ego Iheanacho as Iyabo Kuti
- Martha Ehinome as Tumininu “Tumi” Kuti
- Lanre Adediwura as Olumide “Cobra” Kuti
- Aweodein Adeola as Aunty Labake
- Modesinuola Ogundiwin as Kanyinsola Adeleke
- Casey Edema as Dimeji
- Miracle Gabriel as Ebunoluwa “Ebun” Kuti
- Mofe Stephens as Fola

=== Supporting ===
- Carol King as Grace Adeleke
- Tersy Akpata as Ewa
- Olawale Gold as Detective Kolapo
- Rhoda Albert as Paulina
- Muyiwa Donald as Kazeem
- Toluwanimi Adekanmbi as Bisola
- Jare Martins as Chief Popoola
- Taiwo Ibikunle as Biggie
- Ayorinde Babatope as Percy
- Misi Molu as Omolara
- Odufeso Olajumoke as Young Wura
- Obadare Akinade as Young Olusegun
- Adekunle David as Baby Tumi
- Chukwuebuka Ude as Adewale
- Audrey Edak Harrison as Mandy

== Episodes ==
No. overall	No. in season	Title	Directed by	Written by	Original release date
201	1	TBA	Ben Chiadika	Musa Jeffery David	23 September 2024
202	2	TBA	Unknown	Unknown	24 September 2024
Uncle Adisa makes an unusual demand. Dimeji makes a shocking discovery about bisola.
203	3	TBA	Philemon Maigari	Lois Truly	30 September 2024
Dimeji races against time to fix the biggest crime committed against the love of his life.
204	4	TBA	Philemon Maigari	Esther Kokori	1 October 2024
Dimeji sneaks past Detective Kolapo to speak to Tumi and all hell breaks loose.
205	5	TBA	Adeola Osunkojo	Olumide Kuti	7 October 2024
Two unlikely allies share the pain of losing people they loved.
206	6	TBA	Ben Chiadika	Isaac Ayodeji	8 October 2024
Two unlikely allies share the pain of losing people they loved.
207	7	TBA	Ben Chiadika	Isaac Ayodeji	14 October 2024
Fola wants answers from Iyabo. Jeje tries to stand up for Tumi, but is he making things worse?
208	8	TBA	Unknown	Unknown	15 October 2024
Mide learns of Fola's intentions for Iyabo and is enraged. Tensions between Jeje and Grace boil over putting Tony on the spot.
209	9	TBA	Adeola Osunkojo	Olumide Kuti	21 October 2024
The Kutis are on the verge of being millionaires but that might not hold their family together. Mide confronts Fola about Iyabo and gets a surprise.
210	10	TBA	Unknown	Unknown	22 October 2024
Lolu stresses as the auction falls apart in more ways than one.
211	11	TBA	Philemon Maigari	Uchenna Ugwu	28 October 2024
Everyone is reeling after an old enemy makes an appearance at the gold auction. Jeje makes a big sacrifice for Tumi.
212	12	TBA	Philemon Maigari	Uchenna Ugwu	29 October 2024
Iyabo gets the sign she has been waiting for and when Biggie can't be traced. The Adelekes worry that something bad has happened to Jeje.
213	13	TBA	Adeola Osunkojo	Uchenna Ugwu	4 November 2024
The future looks bleak for Wura and her family without the gold. Iyabo starts to question her decisions around Fola.
214	14	TBA	Adeola Osunkojo	Uchenna Ugwu	5 November 2024
Wura is out for blood while Aunty Labake bumps into an old crush.
215	15	TBA	Adeola Osunkojo	Esther Kokori	11 November 2024
Fola is caught between two best friends. Mide might have found a way to avoid a lengthy prison sentence.
216	16	TBA	Adeola Osunkojo	Lois Truly	12 November 2024
Iyabo does her best to maintain a friendship with Aunty Labake despite her feelings for Fola.
217	17	TBA	Adeola Osunkojo	Isaac Ayodeji	18 November 2024
Mide and Tony hit a dead end. Fola is confused as Iyabo blows hot and cold.
218	18	TBA	Ben Chiadika	Musa Jeffery David	19 November 2024
Things go terribly wrong for Mide on his mission with Tony. Fola's heartbreak causes a lot of problems for Dimeji and Paulina.
219	19	TBA	Ben Chiadika	Musa Jeffery David	25 November 2024
Mide finds himself in a life and death situation. Iyabo is taken aback by what Aunty Labake tells her about Fola.
220	20	TBA	Philemon Maigari	Musa Jeffery David	26 November 2024
Mide and Tony make a grisly discovery and Iyabo plays matchmaker.
221	21	TBA	Philemon Maigari	Musa Jeffery David	2 December 2024
Fola and Aunty Labake clash over his drinking. And the impossible happens as Mide and Tony continue to work together.
222	22	TBA	Adeola Osunkojo, and Yemi Morafa	Isaac Ayodeji, and Musa Jeffery David	3 December 2024
Tony closes in on Biggie and Aunty Labake has a few surprises for Fola.
223	23	TBA	Yemi Morafa	Lois Truly	9 December 2024
Fola asks something very strange of Iyabo. Mide has to get out of his comfort zone in order to save Tony's life.
224	24	TBA	Yemi Morafa	Lois Truly	10 December 2024
There is celebration at the Kutis. They have a celebrity in their home but soon there are tears of rejection and the Adelekes want Tony to take all the credit for a successful teamwork.
225	25	TBA	Unknown	Unknown	16 December 2024
Mide's life changes in a major way. Wura hears both terrible and outstanding news.
226	26	TBA	Ben Chiadika	Musa Jeffery David	17 December 2024
Wura reaches out to one of her less reputable friends for help, ruffling feathers at home and at work.
227	27	TBA	Ben Chiadika	Olumide Kuti	23 December 2024
Wura decides to grab the bull by the horns and do things her way while Ewa helps Ebun with her graduation dance dilemma.
228	28	TBA	Ben Chiadika	Lois Truly, and Musa Jeffery David	24 December 2024
Mide secretly improves Ebun's mood. Tony walks in on Lois and Wura's trap for Biggie.
229	29	TBA	Unknown	Unknown	30 December 2024
The Adelekes are faced with ill-health and near-death experiences while Ebun gets her dream day with the help of the Iperindo community.
230	30	TBA	Ben Chiadika	Esther Kokori	31 December 2024
Ebun's graduation party turns into a disaster. Lois and Wura are forced to fight for their lives.
231	31	TBA	Ben Chiadika	Musa Jeffery David	6 January 2025
A surprise visit threatens Mide's plans. Kanyinsola is furious when she discovers she's gotten the short end of Wura's generosity.
232	32	TBA	Ben Chiadika	Uchenna Ugwu	7 January 2025
Mide is caught between his lies and a fiancé. An angry Tony confronts Wura for her behaviour towards Kanyinsola.
233	33	TBA	Ben Chiadika	Esther Kokori	13 January 2025
Mide's baby creates instability in the Kuti household while money has the Adeleke house divided.
234	34	TBA	Ben Chiadika	Isaac Ayodeji	14 January 2025
The Kutis are on the verge of another disaster while Tony battles to hold his family together.
235	35	TBA	Ben Chiadika	Uchenna Ugwu	20 January 2025
Wura's actions backfire, and Mide loses big time due to his lies.
236	36	TBA	Ben Chiadika	Uchenna Ugwu	21 January 2025
Backed into a corner by her children, Wura does the unexpected. Paulina breaks up with Mide, then sees a side to him she didn't know existed.
237	37	TBA	Adeola Osunkojo	Olumide Kuti	27 January 2025
Things go horribly wrong when Wura tries to teach her family a lesson.
238	38	TBA	Unknown	Lois Truly	28 January 2025
Tony falls on his sword to bring order to the Adeleke home. The Kutis' festivities end with the loss of one of their own.
239	39	TBA	Unknown	Esther Kokori	3 February 2025
Paulina lands in some baby mama drama, and the Adelekes meet a sketchy character while on a pretend holiday in their homes.
240	40	TBA	Unknown	Unknown	4 February 2025
Mide tries to do the right thing for Timileyin. The Adeleke children fall for a scammer's charms.
241	41	TBA	Unknown	Unknown	10 February 2025
Loveth gets on Iyabo's last nerve. A fire breaks out during the Adeleke children's New Year's Eve celebrations.
242	42	TBA	Unknown	Unknown	11 February 2025
Tempers flare at the Adeleke's New Year's lunch, and the Kutis make a shocking discovery when they return home.
243	43	TBA	Unknown	Unknown	17 February 2025
Loveth pleads her case to the Kutis, just as Wura pulls Tumi back into her web of lies and promises of wealth.
244	44	TBA	Unknown	Unknown	18 February 2025
Fola looks set to lock horns with Wura again over the Ireti project. Ebun is crushed by Loveth's betrayal.
245	45	TBA	Unknown	Unknown	24 February 2025
Fola gets another chance to take Wura down, and Iyabo is furious when she finds out the real reason Loveth moved in with them.
246	46	TBA	Unknown	Unknown	25 February 2025
It's a good day for the Kutis, while the Adelekes face the wrath of Iperindo's residents.
247	47	TBA	Unknown	Unknown	3 March 2025
Just as Tumi is celebrated, she discovers it's all a lie, but Wura turns the tables against a staunch enemy.
248	48	TBA	Unknown	Unknown	4 March 2025
Wura commands Jeje to commit an unspeakable act, and Tumi makes a shocking decision.
249	49	TBA	Unknown	Unknown	10 March 2025
Tumi and Jeje's relationship hits a new low, and Fola gains more support against Wura.
250	50	TBA	Unknown	Unknown	11 March 2025
As truths are revealed, the walls come tumbling down for the Adelekes and Kutis.
251	51	TBA	Unknown	Unknown	17 March 2025
Iyabo hands Tumi the broken-heart pendant she was found wearing as a baby and kicks her out of her house for good. Wura calls on Kolapo as she prepares for war. Tumi's friends turn their backs on her.
252	52	TBA	Unknown	Unknown	18 March 2025
Shots are fired at Frontline Gold mine, and Jeje fights for Tumi's love.
253	53	TBA	Unknown	Unknown	24 March 2025
Wura puts a shocking plan to combat Fola before Detective Kolapo and Jeje. Tumi gets support from an unexpected source.
254	54	TBA	Unknown	Unknown	25 March 2025
Tumi and Dimeji are caught in the eye of the storm. A defiant Wura comes face to face with Fola and angry protesters.
255	55	TBA	Unknown	Unknown	31 March 2025
Tensions rise as the community of Iperindo tries to hold on to the little they have left, and a heartless Wura guns for more.
256	56	TBA	Unknown	Unknown	1 April 2025
Fola's good deeds backfire, and Wura's family is shaken to the core by her actions in Iperindo.
257	57	TBA	Unknown	Unknown	7 April 2025
Wura faces a potential government enquiry and her family is falling apart. Iperindo residents struggle to understand what happened to Fola.
258	58	TBA	Unknown	Olumide Kuti	8 April 2025
The Minister takes things into her own hands, and Jeje reveals a deadly secret.
259	59	TBA	Unknown	Unknown	14 April 2025
260	60	TBA	Unknown	Unknown	15 April 2025

== Production ==
=== Development ===
On 9 September 2024, showmax announced the release date for its third season to be premiered on 23 September 2024.

=== Filming ===
Principal photography of the series set location in Iperindo, a community in Atakunmosa East local government in Osun State, a state in southwestern Nigeria. The community discovered gold first in 1945. In 2017, its gold deposit was evaluated at $5 billion. According to Nigerian Entertainment Today author Anjolaoluwa Abiosun, “its community is plagued with poverty and a lack of basic amenities, including access to potable water, motorable roads, and functioning health facilities”.

=== Casting ===
The third season had thirteen main roles receiving star billing, all returning from the previous season.
