= Wura season 4 =

Wura
- Season 4
- Starring: Scarlet Gomez; Yomi Fash Lanso; Ray Adeka; Iremide Adeoye; Mara Madi; Ego Iheanacho; Sharon Rotimi; Korede Soyinka; Aweodein Adeola; Modesinuola Ogundiwin; Mofe Stephens; Misi Molu; Miracle Gabriel; Casey Edema; Rhoda Albert
- No. of episodes: 130

Release
- Original network: Africa Magic
- Original release: 30 March – 25 September 2026

Season chronology
- ← Previous; Season 3

The fourth season of the Nigerian soap opera series Wura began streaming on 30 March 2026 as an Africa Magic Original, starring Scarlet Gomez, Yomi Fash Lanso, Ray Adeka, Iremide Adeoye, Ego, Sharon Rotimi, Korede Soyinka, Miracle Gabriel, Tersy Akpata, Aweodein Adeola, Modesinuola Ogundiwin, and Casey Edema. The series airs from Monday to Friday at 8 pm (WAT) on Africa Magic Showcase, and 8:30 pm (WAT) on Africa Magic Family.

== Plot ==
Haunted by guilt and surrounded by growing opposition, Wura struggles to maintain control of her gold-mining empire as she faces mounting pressure from external enemies and internal family conflicts. As alliances shift and long-buried secrets resurface, tensions within the Adeleke family intensify, threatening to tear the dynasty apart. With trust eroding and loyalties tested, Wura is forced to confront the fallout of her decisions as her once-powerful empire begins to unravel. The season centres on themes of consequence, betrayal, and survival, as Wura fights to protect her legacy while navigating a world closing in on her from all sides.

== Cast and characters ==
=== Main ===
- Scarlet Gomez as Wura Amoo-Adeleke
- Yomi Fash Lanso as Anthony Adeleke
- Ray Adeka as Jejeloye "Jeje" Amoo
- Iremide Adeoye as Lolu Adeleke
- Mara Madi as Eve Adeleke
- Oluwaseyi Akinsola as Femi
- Ropo Ewenla as Olusegun "Pa" Kuti
- Ego Iheanacho as Iyabo Kuti
- Sharon Rotimi as Tumininu "Tumi" Kuti
- Korede Soyinka as Olumide "Cobra" Kuti
- Aweodein Adeola as Aunty Labake
- Modesinuola Ogundiwin as Kanyinsola Adeleke
- Casey Edema as Dimeji
- Miracle Gabriel as Ebunoluwa "Ebun" Kuti
- Mofe Stephens as Fola

=== Supporting ===
- Carol King as Grace Adeleke
- Tersy Akpata as Ewa
- Olawale Gold as Detective Kolapo
- Rhoda Albert as Paulina
- Muyiwa Donald as Kazeem
- Toluwanimi Adekanmbi as Bisola
- Jare Martins as Chief Popoola
- Taiwo Ibikunle as Biggie
- Ayorinde Babatope as Percy
- Misi Molu as Omolara
- Anabel Thaddeus as Young Wura
- Obadare Akinade as Young Olusegun
- Adefisoye Salem as Baby Tumi
- Chukwuebuka Ude as Adewale
- Audrey Edak Harrison as Mandy
- Alabi Raphael as Young Bolu
- Presh Talker as ACP Julia
- Moyinoluwa Olutayo as Dr Njoku
- Jsmile Uhuru as Mutana

== Episodes ==
No. overall	No. in season	Title	Directed by	Written by	Original release date
261	1	"Birds Don't Sing, They Screech In Pain"	Daniel Oriahi	Unknown	30 March 2026
262	2	"The Land of Saints and Sinners"	Daniel Oriahi	Unknown	31 March 2026
Tumi narrates her ordeal to ACP Julia. Wura is pronounced dead. The Kutis begin their search for Tumi.
263	3	"The Devil's Business"	Daniel Oriahi	Unknown	1 April 2026
Teni faces an ultimatum while Olumide and Jeje search for missing Tumi.
264	4	"Law of the Jungle"	Daniel Oriahi	Unknown	2 April 2026
Jeje issues an ultimatum as Iyabo seeks help, shocking truths surface with Kolapo.
265	5	"The Road Less Traveled"	Daniel Oriahi	Unknown	3 April 2026
ACP Julia probes Tony as Dimeji tracks kidnappers, Teni preps Jeje, Kanyisola plots.
266	6	"No Country for Old Men"	Daniel Oriahi	Unknown	6 April 2026
ACP Julia survives a hit, clashes with Kolapo, CEO battles rages, new suspect named, Jeje confronts Wura.
267	7	"A Game of Shadows"	Daniel Oriahi	Unknown	7 April 2026
Tony faces a tough choice, Jeje teams with Kolapo. Iyabo seeks help, Julia sets a trap for Kolapo.
268	8	"Even Lambs Have Teeth"	Daniel Oriahi	Unknown	8 April 2026
Captain B shows his true colors, Tony grills Wura's assassin, Kolapo emerges an unlikely hero.
269	9	"The Sum of all Fears"	Daniel Oriahi	Unknown	9 April 2026
Tumi returns home, protest erupts. Tony sways board, Kanyinsola becomes acting CEO of the mine.
270	10	"House of Cards"	Daniel Oriahi	Unknown	10 April 2026
Wura wakes, family rejoices. Kanyinsola's CEO debut falters as Kolapo offers Wura a way out.
271	11	"Actions and Consequences"	Adeola Osunkojo	Unknown	13 April 2026
Tumi exposes Wura, sparking chaos that impacts ACP Julia, the Adelekes, and her family.
272	12	"The Revolution will be televised"	Adeola Osunkojo	Unknown	14 April 2026
Tumi stands firm, protests rise. Tony loses control as the Adelekes turn on each other.
273	13	"The devil's bargain"	Adeola Osunkojo	Unknown	15 April 2026
Ebun's future at risk, Olumide helps. Wura makes a deal, Tumi & Dimeji reconnect as Jeje returns with a warning.
274	14	"Bloodlines"	Adeola Osunkojo	Unknown	16 April 2026
Tumi confronts Wura, breaking family illusions, Mide and Kanyinsola face their own inner struggles.
275	15	"The Scapegoat"	Adeola Osunkojo	Unknown	17 April 2026
Wura reveals a 26-year secret, Mide tricks Iyabo & Tumi to reconcile, Tony orders Tumi's arrest.
276	16	"The Smoking Gun"	Daniel Oriahi	Unknown	20 April 2026
Gun used on Wura is found on Tumi, family loyalties fracture, and Tony starts doubting her.
277	17	"The Water and The Blood"	Daniel Oriahi	Unknown	21 April 2026
Iyabo learns Tumi's birth truth, Kanyinsola urges Lolu's choice, and Wura lays a deadly trap.
278	18	"The Devil and The Deep Blue Sea"	Daniel Oriahi	Unknown	22 April 2026
Iyabo heals from betrayal, Tumi faces new threats, and Dimeji contemplates a deal with the devil.
279	19	"The Perfect Plan"	Daniel Oriahi	Unknown	23 April 2026
Iyabo & Dimeji scramble for Tumi's bail, Kolapo plans to save Wura as Julia closes in.
280	20	"The Turnaround"	Unknown	Unknown	24 April 2026
Tumi survives a cell attack, Mide risks getting her bail, and the Adelekes plan Wura's party.
281	21	"The Art of Self-Preservation"	Ben Chiadiha	Unknown	27 April 2026
Wura & Jeje arrested, Tumi's victory short-lived. Ebun faces betrayal at a classmate's party.
282	22	"A Prophecy of Doom"	Ben Chiadiha	Unknown	28 April 2026
Olumide is shamed in a fight, Wura meets a prophet of doom, and Kanyinsola finally speaks out.
283	23	"Those who live by the Gun"	Ben Chiadiha	Unknown	29 April 2026
Wura receives shocking news, allies with Kanyinsola, Ebun sets her baddie plans in motion.
284	24	"The Hydra-Headed Monster"	Ben Chiadiha	Unknown	30 April 2026
Olumide faces a dilemma, Wura forms a theory, while Kanyinsola's CEO debut goes awry.
285	25	"Ebun 2.0"	Ben Chiadiha	Unknown	1 May 2026
Olumide gets sudden funds, sparking Kuti chaos as Baale Okunade raises land fees. Wura's fight with Julia turns political.
286	26	"Controlling the Narrative"	Ben Chiadiha	Unknown	4 May 2026
Olumide is barricaded by Mutana and his blood thirsty hoods. Barrister Ben's arrival provides more questions than answers.
287	27	"Shattering Norms"	Adeola Osunkojo	Unknown	5 May 2026
Paulina stops Mutana and Olumide, Kanyinsola seeks Wura's help, and Iperindo women unite against Baale.
288	28	"Much Ado About Love"	Adeola Osunkojo	Unknown	6 May 2026
Paulina starts wedding prep, Dimeji invites an unwelcome guest, sparking a love triangle.
289	29	"The cost of Love"	Adeola Osunkojo	Unknown	7 May 2026
Paulina halts wedding plans, Tumi doubts Mide, and Kanyinsola faces a tough choice for the company.
290	30	"History Repeats Itself"	Adeola Osunkojo	Unknown	8 May 2026
Paulina's family reduces the bride price list. Wura pays Baale Okunade a visit. Tumi might just have a new admirer.
291	31	"Out of the Mouth of Drunks"	Daniel Oriahi	Unknown	11 May 2026
Mutana bullies Olumide, Ewa faces rejection, and Jeje receives an unusual gift.
292	32	"The Past, The Present, and The Future"	Daniel Oriahi	Unknown	12 May 2026
Wura targets Barrister Ben, Kazeem mends a friendship, and Tumi clashes with Jeje again.
293	33	"Rising Stakes"	Daniel Oriahi	Unknown	13 May 2026
Tumi files for divorce, Jeje agrees. Ewa confronts Kazeem, and Barrister Ben gets Baale's warning.
294	34	"Barter"	Unknown	Unknown	14 May 2026
Ewa is at loggerheads with Tumi. Dimeji confronts Tumi about Barrister Ben. Kanyinsola has evidence that she holds over Wura's head.
295	35	"Finally, A Wedding"	Unknown	Unknown	15 May 2026
Paulina receives an unexpected surprise on her wedding day. Wura's defence is slowly coming together.
296	36	"Till Loveth Do Us Part"	Unknown	Unknown	18 May 2026
Paulina's marriage struggles, Eve experiments with Tumi, and Wura readies herself for trail.
297	37	"Fractures"	Unknown	Unknown	19 May 2026
Loveth threatens Paulina's marriage, Tumi advances in her quest, and Kanyinsola faces consequences.
298	38	"Unwelcome"	Unknown	Unknown	20 May 2026
Loveth strains Paulina & Mide's marriage, Wura faces a threat, Kanyinsola turns the tables.
299	39	TBA	Unknown	Unknown	21 May 2026
Olumide is trapped, Paulina struggles with her marriage, and Wura may fix her Adeola issue.
300	40	"The Ides of March"	Unknown	Unknown	22 May 2026
Tony suspects Wura & Adeola, Olumide wrestles with duty vs desire, and Iyabo takes a stand.
301	41	"Turning Tides"	Unknown	Unknown	25 May 2026
Jeje holds a secret on Anjola. Iyabo rises to defend women, while Paulina's troubled marriage nears collapse.
302	42	"Waves of Uncertainty"	Unknown	Unknown	26 May 2026
Paulina leaves, Olumide fights to win her back. Tony helps Kanyinsola, while Ben urges Tumi to drop Wura's case.
303	43	"Double Wahala for Dead Bodi"	Unknown	Unknown	27 May 2026
Wura and The Kutis receive unexpected news about trial. For the Kutis, it reopens old wounds, and sparks a desperation for Wura.
304	44	"Double Whammy"	Unknown	Unknown	28 May 2026
Wura's plan collapses under Ben's wit as trial troubles mount, while Loveth targets Olumide with a bold offensive.
305	45	"Collateral Damage"	Unknown	Unknown	29 May 2026
Anjola faces a demanding surprise guest. The Kutis flout customs and land in trouble, as Zara Cole calls her first witness.
306	46	TBA	Unknown	Unknown	1 June 2026
307	47	TBA	Unknown	Unknown	2 June 2026
308	48	TBA	Unknown	Unknown	3 June 2026
Upon discovering Lolu’s name on the witness list, Wura fears he may testify against her and instructs her lawyer to challenge his credibility in court.
309	49	TBA	Unknown	Unknown	4 June 2026
310	50	TBA	Unknown	Unknown	5 June 2026
311	51	TBA	Unknown	Unknown	8 June 2026
Prosecution falters without a key witness. Paulina gets bad news as tensions escalate into a family feud.
312	52	TBA	Unknown	Unknown	9 June 2026
Iyabo takes the stand in Wura's trial. Loveth is bent on holding Olumide to his word. Tony gets a revelation.
313	53	TBA	Unknown	Unknown	10 June 2026
Wura's marriage crumbles as trust fades, Anjola risks everything, and Loveth pushes the Kutis to collapse.
314	54	TBA	Unknown	Unknown	11 June 2026
Tony faces a shocking truth, Paulina's bar is at risk, and the Kutis fear their case is falling apart.
315	55	TBA	Unknown	Unknown	12 June 2026
Wura and Tony face attacks, Christo's body vanishes, and Tony shocks court by defending Wura.
316	56	TBA	Unknown	Unknown	15 June 2026
Tony struggles with guilt, Jeje and Kanyinsola target Anjola, while Paulina pressures Olumide for help.
317	57	TBA	Unknown	Unknown	16 June 2026
Olumide moves on Paulina's plan, the Kutis face a shock in court, and Wura tempts Dimeji with a deal.
318	58	TBA	Unknown	Unknown	17 June 2026
319	59	TBA	Unknown	Unknown	18 June 2026
ACP Julia faces pressure, Dimeji battles guilt, Paulina stirs trouble, and Anjola sets her secret plan in motion.
320	60	TBA	Unknown	Unknown	19 June 2026
Anjola strikes a deal with Mutana. Dimeji evades further questions about his testimony. Wura finally testifies.
321	61	TBA	Unknown	Unknown	22 June 2026
Wura's testimony weakens the Kutis' case, while Temi corners Anjola and tensions keep rising.
322	62	TBA	Unknown	Unknown	23 June 2026
Wura gains a radical ally, Tumi faces social media backlash again, and Paulina begins a fresh start.
323	63	TBA	Unknown	Unknown	24 June 2026
Wura and Jeje's trial ends. Pressure mounts on Anjola on two fronts. Olumide tries to get his wife back.
324	64	TBA	Unknown	Unknown	25 June 2026
325	65	TBA	Unknown	Unknown	26 June 2026
326	66	TBA	Unknown	Unknown	29 June 2026
Wura buys back shares, secures more mining land with a bribe, while Tumi suffers a public meltdown.
327	67	"To The Victor Go The Spoils"	Unknown	Unknown	30 June 2026
Wura celebrates her win, Anjola plots, and Tony's discovery forces Wura into a tough decision.
328	68	"Fire On The Mountain"	Unknown	Unknown	1 July 2026
Adelekes face chaos over Tony's silent divorce, Ebun grieves her friends, and Olumide rises against the government.
329	69	"Double Wahala For Dead Body"	Unknown	Unknown	2 July 2026
Police hunt Olumide Kuti, Eve drowns in alcohol over her parents' divorce, and Wura escalates her plans.
330	70	"We The People"	Unknown	Unknown	3 July 2026
Olumide rebels against the system, Tony uncovers a disturbing truth about Precious, and Labake faces a moral dilemma.
331	71	TBA	Unknown	Unknown	6 July 2026
Eve suffers a medical emergency. Paulina questions Olumide's political team. Tony questions himself.
332	72	TBA	Unknown	Unknown	7 July 2026
As family, ambition, and power collide, three lives are tested by conflict, sacrifice, and destiny.
333	73	TBA	Unknown	Unknown	8 July 2026
Olumide is roughed up by some thugs. The people of Iperindo storm the Baale's house. Is Tony in love?
334	74	TBA	Unknown	Unknown	9 July 2026
Tony battles his daughter's rebellion, Paulina returns to politics, and Olumide's secrets come to light.
335	75	TBA	Unknown	Unknown	10 July 2026
Olumide gets a political offer, Anjola uncovers a secret, and Eve faces trouble.
336	76	TBA	Unknown	Unknown	13 July 2026
Tony learns Eve is kidnapped, Anjola handles the ransom, and Olumide seeks help.
337	77	TBA	Unknown	Unknown	14 July 2026
Tony schemes for cash, politics turn dirty, and Eve's escape ends badly.
338	78	TBA	Unknown	Unknown	15 July 2026
Tony faces a kidnapper's deadline, Paulina's troubles grow, and Eve's life hangs by a thread.
339	79	TBA	Unknown	Unknown	16 July 2026
Wura tracks kidnappers, Olumide risks his family, and police close in on Temi and Mathew.
340	80	TBA	Unknown	Unknown	17 July 2026
The search for Eve intensifies as Tony pays ransom and Olumide faces the cost of ambition.
341	81	TBA	Unknown	Unknown	20 July 2026
Eve's return sparks tension, Olumide makes a key decision, and Tumi uncovers a shocking secret.
342	82	TBA	Unknown	Unknown	21 July 2026
Tony reaches his breaking point, Eve and Kanyinsola expose Anjola, and Iyabo questions Olumide's wealth.
343	83	TBA	Unknown	Unknown	22 July 2026
Kanyinsola is attacked, Wura plots anew, and Olumide crosses a dark line.
344	84	TBA	Unknown	Unknown	23 July 2026
Kanyinsola is rescued, Dimeji gets a new opportunity, and the Kutis cling to hope and prayer.
345	85	TBA	Unknown	Unknown	24 July 2026
Kanyinsola has a personal vendetta against Wura. The people of Iperindo might just get justice after all.
346	86	TBA	Unknown	Unknown	27 July 2026
Iyabo shocks her family, Eve defies Tony, and both families face fallout.
347	87	TBA	Unknown	Unknown	28 July 2026
Olumide shifts focus as Kanyinsola battles mine troubles and a hidden threat grows.
348	88	TBA	Unknown	Unknown	29 July 2026
Anjola plots for cash, Paulina surprises, and Olumide goes on the warpath.
349	89	TBA	Unknown	Unknown	30 July 2026
Iyabo risks family unity, Dimeji fights back, and Wura gets an unexpected visitor.
350	90	TBA	Unknown	Unknown	31 July 2026
Olumide faces a painful truth as Iyabo rises, while Kanyinsola struggles with Dimeji.
351	91	TBA	Unknown	Unknown	3 August 2026
Olumide and Iyabo clash, Kanyinsola supports Wura, and Anjola finally lands a buyer.
352	92	TBA	Unknown	Unknown	4 August 2026
Kanyinsola faces mine troubles, Paulina shuts Olumide down, Eve makes a bold move.
353	93	TBA	Unknown	Unknown	5 August 2026
Anjola plots, Tumi seeks peace with Wura, and Eve faces a shocking truth.
354	94	TBA	Unknown	Unknown	6 August 2026
Tony meets an old friend, Tumi faces consequences, and Dimeji rejects Kanyinsola.
355	95	"One Good Turn Deserves Another"	Unknown	Unknown	7 August 2026
Dimeji is confused, Anjola nears her goal, and Tumi gets revenge on Wura.
356	96	TBA	Unknown	Unknown	10 August 2026
Anjola runs out of time, Kanyinsola's affair is exposed, and Jeje returns too late.
357	97	TBA	Unknown	Unknown	11 August 2026
Wura changes, Tony faces a new threat, and Anjola's secret could destroy the Adelekes.
358	98	TBA	Unknown	Unknown	12 August 2026
Tony's crisis with Precious grows, Wura denies Tumi's role, and Paulina faces Dimeji.
359	99	TBA	Unknown	Unknown	13 August 2026
Tony's lawsuit backfires, Tumi seeks revenge on Wura, and Dimeji saves Frontline Goldmine.
360	100	TBA	Unknown	Unknown	14 August 2026
Labake chooses sides, Olumide returns to politics, and Anjola makes Precious an offer.
361	101	TBA	Unknown	Unknown	17 August 2026
Uncle Adisa tries to reconcile Iyabo and Olumide, Wura rebuilds, and Anjola plots quietly.
362	102	TBA	Unknown	Unknown	18 August 2026
Iyabo battles rumours, Wura's apology hurts, and Anjola pushes Precious to act boldly.
363	103	TBA	Unknown	Unknown	19 August 2026
Iyabo's family splits, Wura is haunted by her past, and Tony and Kanyinsola face shocks.
364	104	"Survival Instincts"	Unknown	Unknown	20 August 2026
Precious loses trust, Iyabo fights for councillorship, and the Kutis face uncertainty.
365	105	"What The People Want Versus What The People Get"	Unknown	Unknown	21 August 2026
Anjola rises in Adeleke house, Iyabo gains election support, and Olumide fails to sabotage.
366	106	TBA	Unknown	Unknown	24 August 2026
367	107	TBA	Unknown	Unknown	25 August 2026
368	108	TBA	Unknown	Unknown	26 August 2026
369	109	TBA	Unknown	Unknown	27 August 2026
370	110	TBA	Unknown	Unknown	28 August 2026
371	111	TBA	Unknown	Unknown	31 August 2026
372	112	TBA	Unknown	Unknown	1 September 2026
373	113	TBA	Unknown	Unknown	2 September 2026
374	114	TBA	Unknown	Unknown	3 September 2026
375	115	TBA	Unknown	Unknown	4 September 2026
376	116	TBA	Unknown	Unknown	7 September 2026
377	117	TBA	Unknown	Unknown	8 September 2026
378	118	TBA	Unknown	Unknown	9 September 2026
379	119	TBA	Unknown	Unknown	10 September 2026
380	120	TBA	Unknown	Unknown	11 September 2026
381	121	TBA	Unknown	Unknown	14 September 2026
382	122	TBA	Unknown	Unknown	15 September 2026
383	123	TBA	Unknown	Unknown	16 September 2026
384	124	TBA	Unknown	Unknown	17 September 2026
385	125	TBA	Unknown	Unknown	18 September 2026
386	126	TBA	Unknown	Unknown	21 September 2026
387	127	TBA	Unknown	Unknown	22 September 2026
388	128	TBA	Unknown	Unknown	23 September 2026
389	129	TBA	Unknown	Unknown	24 September 2026
390	130	TBA	Unknown	Unknown	25 September 2026

== Production ==
=== Development ===
On 21 March 2026, MultiChoice announced that Season 4 would air on Africa Magic following the discontinuation of Showmax, with its catalogue migrated to DStv Stream and GOtv Stream.

On the same day, Africa Magic announced the release date for the fourth season to premiere on 30 March 2026.

=== Filming ===
Daniel Oriahi joined the production team as a director on the 4th season and debuted on episode 1.

=== Casting ===
The fourth season introduced three new cast members in established main roles, while ten principal cast members reprised their roles from the previous season. Sharon Rotimi steps in as Tumi Kuti, originally played by Martha Ehinome. Mara Madi steps in as Eve Adeleke, originally played by Toluwani George. Korede Soyinka steps in as Olumide "Cobra" Kuti, originally played by Lanre Adediwura.
