= Wura (TV series) =

Nigerian TV series

- Genre: Drama, Soap
- Based on: The River
- Written by: Musa Jeffery David (HW.); Olumide Kuti; Isaac Ayodeji; Esther Kokori; Lois Truly; Uchenna Ugwu
- Directed by: Dimeji Ajibola; Adeola Osunkojo; Yemi Morafa; Ben Chiadika; Philemon Maigari; Daniel Oriahi
- Starring: Scarlet Gomez; Yomi Fash Lanso; Carol King; Ray Adeka; Iremide Adeoye; Ego Iheanacho; Martha Ehinome; Lanre Adediwura; Mofe Stephens; Modesinuola Ogundiwin
- Theme music composer: Nelson Kenneth (Kukushi)
- Country of origin: Nigeria
- Original languages: English; Yoruba
- No. of seasons: 4
- No. of episodes: 390

Production
- Executive producer: Rogers Ofime
- Producer: Preye Odibo
- Production location: Iperindo
- Running time: 28–29 minutes
- Production company: Native Media

Original release
- Network: Showmax
- Release: 23 January 2023 – 15 April 2025
- Network: Africa Magic
- Release: 23 January 2023 – 25 September 2026

Wura is a 2023 Showmax original Nigerian soap opera, executively produced by Rogers Ofime. The series is best known to be Nigerian first longest Showmax original series, starring Scarlet Gomez, Yomi Fash Lanso, Carol King, Ray Adeka, Iremide Adeoye, Ego Iheanacho, Martha Ehinome, Lanre Adediwura, Oluwaseyi Akinsola, Ropo Ewenla, Miracle Gabriel, and Tersy Akpata. The fourth season was released on Africa Magic, following the discontinuation of Showmax.

Wura is an adaptation of the South African soap opera The River, an M-Net original production streaming on Showmax.

== Series overview ==
Each episode from Season 1 and Season 2 was released four times weekly from Monday to Thursday on Showmax. Only the Season 3, Showmax announced each episode will be released two times weekly from Monday to Tuesday. On the final season, Africa Magic announced each episode will be released five times weekly from Monday to Friday on Africa Magic Showcase by 8pm (WAT), and Africa Magic Family by 8:30pm (WAT).

Season	Episodes	Originally released	
Season	Episodes	First released	Last released
1	100	January 23, 2023	July 13, 2023
2	100	December 4, 2023	May 23, 2024
3	60	September 23, 2024	April 15, 2025
4	130	March 30, 2026	September 25, 2026

=== Season 1 (2023) ===
Wura is a ruthless gold-mining magnate and CEO of Frontline Gold Mine in Iperindo community. She is a faultless and a saint in her family but when it comes to running her business, she becomes that ruthless lady, who doesn't care whose ox is gored in her path to get what she wants. Jeje and Detective Kolapo clean after her. The first season introduces Kanyinsola her husband's daughter, who tries to expose her at all costs.

=== Season 2 (2023) ===
The first nine episodes focus on Kanyinsola covering up Detective Mark's body after he died in her room in the Adeleke's mansion. During a dinner outside the Adeleke's mansion, her stepmother Wura discovered she was acting cold and followed her after dinner. Kanyinsola was about to bury his body in Estate when Wura saw her and recorded it. The second half of the season focuses on Wura in a clash with Fola, as the people of the Iperindo community, discover they have been robbed for years by Wura when Fola breaks the news about the community owning 30% of the Gold mine discovered in Iperindo. Wura stuck a deal with Fola, which ended up so bad that Fola exposed her in front of her husband, who is the commissioner of police Anthony Adeleke. Tumininu became Wura's mouthpiece to communicate with the community, as Wura tried to get back at Fola.

=== Season 3 (2024) ===
In the season, Wura pays for her ruthless action as her long-buried secrets are brought to light, while she tries to save her gold mine and family. Tumi on the other hand finds out she's not a Kuti, while Jeje loses her to her first love Dimeji after Bisola's secrets catch up with her. Dimeji meets with Jamal's biological father, Saheed, at their son's birthday, leaving his wife Bisola speechless.

=== Season 4 (2026) ===
In the season, Wura grapples with the consequences of her past actions after the events of the previous season. Haunted by guilt and surrounded by growing opposition, Wura struggles to maintain control of her gold-mining empire as she faces mounting pressure from external enemies and internal family conflicts. As alliances shift and long-buried secrets resurface, tensions within the Adeleke family intensify, threatening to tear the dynasty apart. With trust eroding and loyalties tested, Wura is forced to confront the fallout of her decisions as her once-powerful empire begins to unravel. The season centres on themes of consequence, betrayal, and survival, as Wura fights to protect her legacy while navigating a world closing in on her from all sides.

== Cast and characters ==
- Scarlet Gomez as Wura Amoo-Adeleke
- Yomi Fash Lanso as Anthony Adeleke
- Ray Adeka as Jejeloye “Jeje” Amoo
- Iremide Adeoye as Lolu Adeleke
- Toluwani George as Eve Adeleke (season 1, 2, and 3)
- Mara Madi as Eve Adeleke (season 4)
- Oluwaseyi Akinsola as Femi
- Ropo Ewenla as Olusegun “Pa” Kuti
- Ego Iheanacho as Iyabo Kuti
- Martha Ehinome as Tumininu “Tumi” Kuti (season 1, 2, and 3)
- Sharon Rotimi as Tumininu “Tumi” Kuti (season 4)
- Lanre Adediwura as Olumide “Cobra” Kuti (season 1, 2, and 3)
- Korede Soyinka as Olumide “Cobra” Kuti (season 4)
- Aweodein Adeola as Aunty Labake
- Modesinuola Ogundiwin as Kanyinsola Adeleke
- Carol King as Grace Adeleke
- Miracle Gabriel as Ebunoluwa “Ebun” Kuti
- Casey Edema as Dimeji
- Tersy Akpata as Ewa
- Olawale Gold as Detective Kolapo
- Rhoda Albert as Paulina
- Muyiwa Donald as Kazeem
- Toluwanimi Adekanmbi as Bisola
- Mofe Stephens as Fola
- Jare Martins as Chief Popoola
- Taiwo Ibikunle as Biggie
- Ayorinde Babatope as Percy
- Misi Molu as Omolara
- Odufeso Olajumoke as Young Wura Amoo
- Obadare Akinade as Young Olusegun Kuti
- Adekunle David as Baby Tumi
- Chukwuebuka Ude as Adewale
- Audrey Edak Harrison as Mandy
- Alabi Raphael as Young Bolu
- Presh Talker as ACP Julia
- Moyinoluwa Olutayo as Dr Njoku
- Anabel Thaddeus as Young Wura
- Jsmile Uhuru as Mutana

== Production ==
=== Filming ===
Principal photography of the series set location in Iperindo, a community in Atakunmosa East local government in Osun State, a state in southwestern Nigeria. The community discovered gold first in 1945. In 2017, its gold deposit was evaluated at $5 billion. According to Nigerian Entertainment Today author Anjolaoluwa Abiosun, “its community is plagued with poverty and a lack of basic amenities, including access to potable water, motorable roads, and functioning health facilities”.

On 22 April 2023, shortly after Wura hit 50 episodes, the producers spoke with The Guardian Saturday Magazine, about its plan for the first season to reach over 200 episodes. On 13 June 2023, following the release of episode 82 in its 1st season, one of Tinsel directors, Ben Chiadika joined the production team, led by Rogers Ofime as a director. Philemon Maigari joined the production team as a director on the 2nd season. Philemon debuted on episode 10 of its 2nd Season, as a co-director alongside Ben Chiadika.

== Premiere and release ==
On 19 January 2023, The Ọọ̀ni of Ifẹ̀ (King of Ife), Oba Adeyeye Enitan Ogunwusi hosted a private screening at his palace of the first few episodes of the Showmax original series in Osun State. The King wives, Olori Tobi Philips Ogunwusi, Olori Aderonke Ademiluyi Ogunwusi, Olori Afolashade Ogunwusi, and Wura stars Scarlet Gomez, Yomi Fash-Lanso and Ego Iheanacho, alongside other cast and crew members where in attendance.

The king at the official premiere, described the show, saying: “The show was very well put together and professionally done”, and added to the remark by saying: “I’m very impressed and I rarely get impressed with things. I love the naturalistic effect of the series. It premiered to me at the palace and I could barely find any faults. I have to give the entire crew some major credit. The story is very well scripted and that’s the typical determination you find in any Nigerian. It’s a show that will impact society not only in Ife. I look forward to watching the rest of it because it’s very obvious that it’s a series that will address a lot of societal ills and will engage the citizenry as a whole.”

On 13 July 2023, Showmax announced the end of season 1, shortly after the release of the 100 episodes "Blabbermouth". On 13 November 2023, showmax announce the release date for its second season to be premiered on 4 December 2023. Recurring actress Modesinuola Ogundiwin, to join the main cast. On 3 December 2023, Showmax hosted a private screening at Obafemi Awolowo University. The first few episodes of the second season premiered at the event, with Wura cast and crew members in attendance including Scarlet Gomez, Yomi Fash-Lanso, Martha Ehinome, Casey Edema, Ray Adeka, Lanre Adediwura, Ego, Modesinuola Ogundiwin, and Tersy Akpata.

On 9 September 2024, Showmax announced that season 3 would be released on 23 September 2024 with a teaser trailer, and concluded on 15 April 2025, with 60 episodes.

On 21 March 2026, MultiChoice announced that Season 4 would air on Africa Magic following the discontinuation of Showmax, with its catalogue migrated to DStv Stream and GOtv Stream.

== Reception ==
=== Critical reception ===
Professional ratings
Review scores
Source	Rating
Premium Times	6/10

Wura has received favourable reviews from critics. Reviewing for Premium Times, Shola-Adido Oladotun said “If there is one thing Nollywood producers continue to teach us; it’s their fearlessness in exploring different film genres. With the release of Shanty Town and Showmax’s latest original project, ‘Wura’, one cannot help but get excited at what this year has in store.”

=== Impact ===
Wura took over Tiktok with its hashtag "#wurashowmax", and as of 22 June 2023, the hashtag has received 39M TikTok views.

=== Awards and nominations ===
Year	Award	Category	Recipient	Result	Ref
2023	Africa Magic Viewers' Choice Awards	Best Actress In A Drama, Movie Or TV Series	Scarlet Gomez	Lost	
2023	Scream All Youth Awards	Best actor in a TV series	Ray Adeka	Won	
2023	Scream All Youth Awards	Best actress in a lead role	Scarlet Gomez	Won	
2023	Scream All Youth Awards	Best actor in a supporting role	Iremide Adeoye, and Muyiwa Donald	Won	
2023	Scream All Youth Awards	Best actor in a supporting role	Ray Adeka, and Lanre Adediwura	Lost	
2023	Scream All Youth Awards	Best actress in a supporting role	Audrey Edak Harrison	Lost	
2024	Africa Magic Viewers' Choice Awards	Best Writing - TV Series	Wura Season 2	Lost	
2024	Africa Magic Viewers' Choice Awards	Best Series (Scri1pted)	Wura Season 2	Lost	
2024	Gage Awards	Best Web Series	Wura	Won	
