= Taiwo Ajai-Lycett =

Nigerian poet and actress (born 1941)

Omoba Taiwo Ajai-Lycett OON
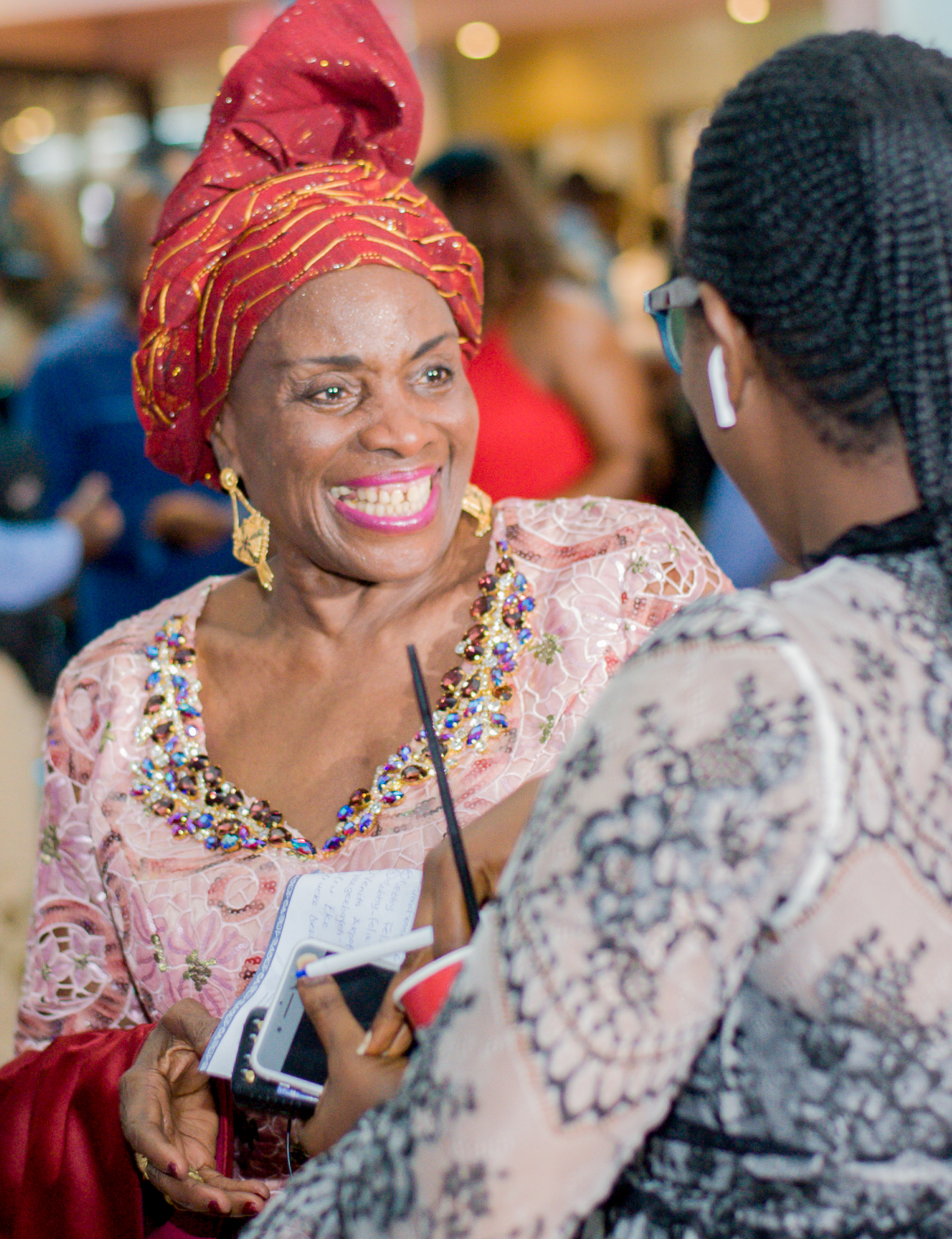
- Ajai-Lycett at AMVCA 2020
- Born: Taiwo Ajai; 3 February 1941 (age 85); Lagos, Western Region, British Nigeria
- Citizenship: Nigerian (1941–present)
- Education: Hendon College of Technology; Guildhall School of Music and Drama
- Occupations: film actress cosmetologist
- Spouse: Thomas Aldridge Lycett

Taiwo Ajai-Lycett, OON (born 3 February 1941) is a Nigerian actress, journalist, television presenter, and cosmetologist. Lycett is a feminist and was the first editor of Africa Woman magazine in the 1970s.

== Biography ==
Taiwo Ajai was born as the first of a set of twin girls on 3 February 1941 in Lagos, Western Region of Colonial Nigeria. Her father was of Awori heritage, being a member of the aristocratic Ashade royal dynasty of Ogba. She was educated at Mt. Carmel Convent School, Lagos, before proceeding to Methodist Girls' High School, Lagos.

To further her studies, she travelled to London to study Business Administration. In London, she took courses at the Christine Shaw School of Beauty Science in London, where she received a certificate in cosmetology. She also attended Hendon College of Technology, where she obtained a Higher National Diploma in Business Studies in 1969. While studying, she worked as a waitress at Lyons Tea Shop, then moved to the Post Office and later advertising. In the Post Office, she started as a personal secretary in 1962 and later worked as a senior secretary in the office of Lord Hall.

She moved to advertising and was in the personnel department of advertising firm, Young and Rubicam. She then worked as a personal assistant to the managing partner of Gresham Broad and Co, an accounting firm. She first became a mother at the age of 15. This caused her parents and family to ignore her, but she then enrolled herself for evening class. In 1959, She had the opportunity of going to the United Kingdom, through her friend David Akinduro, whom she later married. However, the marriage eventually broke down due to domestic violence. After her divorce with Akinduro, she married Thomas Aldridge Lycett, and their marriage was a long-lasting one. Following his death, she continued to live and work in Nigeria. In 2006, she was robbed and raped in her house in Egbe at the age of 65. On 3 February 2021, she celebrated her 80th birthday, when she received greetings from family and friends from distinguished locations.

== Acting career ==
Her acting debut was in December 1966 in Wole Soyinka's The Lion and the Jewel, a two-act comedy directed by William Gaskill at the Royal Court Theatre in London. Her acting debut was not planned, she was in the rehearsal hall of the play when she was asked by Gaskill to be a participant. After the encouragement she received, following her performance and the invitations from producers that followed, she decided to take a career in acting seriously. She enrolled at the Guildhall School of Music and Drama.

In 1972, she left her corporate career and joined the Traverse Theatre Group for the Edinburgh Festival. She was later in a string of television and stage shows. In 1973, she was in Amadu Maddy's play Life Everlasting at the Africa Centre, London, and later in the year, she was in Peter Nichols' The National Health during the Festival of British Theatre. In 1976, she played the lead role in Yemi Ajibade's Parcel Post at the Royal Court Theatre. Together with the actor Louis Mahoney and the writer Mike Phillips, she was a director with the Black Theatre Workshop in London.

She returned to Nigeria in 1971. She has featured in several notable Nigerian films, including Tinsel, the award-winning Nigerian soap opera. Ajai-Lycett also featured in other notable works such as the Nigerian movie Oloibiri. A 2016 action thriller film, Oloibiri was directed by Curtis Graham, produced by Rogers Ofime and starred, in addition to Ajai-Lycett, Olu Jacobs, and Richard Mofe Damijo. The film tells the story on how government agencies, along with oil companies, exploited the newly discovered oil in the historic town of Oloibiri.

Produced by: Rogers Ofime

Directed by: Curtis Graham

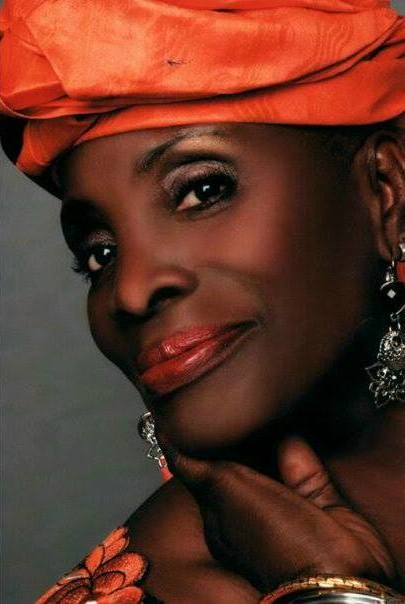
Taiwo in 2015

== Journalism career ==
In 1975, Ajai-Lycett was invited to join the staff of Africa Magazine, published by Raph Uwechue. Later, she became the pioneer editor of Africa Woman magazine, a women's magazine for Africans in the diaspora. As editor, she was a participant at the United Nations International Women's Year.

== Awards and honours ==
On 1 October 2006, she received a national award of Officer of the Order of the Niger, decorated by Chief Olusegun Obasanjo, President of the Federal Republic of Nigeria. In February 2008, at an All-Star Gala held at Theatre Royal Stratford East on the 10th anniversary of Tiata Fahodzi, she was honoured as a leader of British-African theatre, alongside Dotun Adebayo and Yemi Ajibade.

She is a Fellow of the Society of Nigerian Theatre Artists (SONTA).

She was honoured with The Industry Merit Award at the 2022 Africa Magic Viewer's Choice Awards (AMVCA) on 14 May 2022. The awards event was held at the Eko Hotel in Lagos.

== Work ==
=== Stage (selected) ===
Year	Show	Role	Notes
1966	The Lion and the Jewel	Village girl	debut play written by Wole Soyinka
1971	Murderous Angels	Patrice Lumumba's wife	Dublin Theatre Festival, 1971
1973	The Refusal	Oona	Playroom Lunchtime Theatre
1973	Life Everlasting		
1974	The National Health		play directed by Peter Nichols
1974	The Black & White Minstrels	Performer	Hampstead Theatre Club
1972	Edinburgh Festival Fringe	Performer	Traverse Theatre plays: Buddy Caravaggio and Replique.
1976	Parcel Post	Tola Folagunle	
2014	Hear Word!		Play by Ifeoma Fafunwa

== Selected filmography ==
- Some Mothers Do 'Ave 'Em (Season 2, Episode 5 - Father's Clinic) as Sally
- Angels (1975) as Elaine Fitzgerald
- Crown Court (1976) as Adah Obi
- The Honourable (1992)
- Tinsel (TV series)
- Hostages (1996)
- Dazzling Mirage (2014) as Mrs. Fadipe
- Oloibiri (2016) as Ibiere
- Madam President (2017) as Hajiya Halima Ali
- King of Boys: The Return of the King (2021) as Chief Mrs. Randle
- Elesin Oba, The King's Horseman (2022) as Madam Taiwo
- Malaika (2023)
- The Black Book (2023) as Editor
- Meeting Funmi's Parents (2024) as Grandma

== See also ==
- Wole Oguntokun
