= Lanre Adediwura =

Nigerian Actor

- Born: Lanre Adediwura
- Citizenship: Nigeria
- Occupation: Actor
- Years active: 2018–present
- Notable work: God of Thunder and Wura

Lanre Adediwura is a Nigerian actor, known for his role as Olumide Kuti on the Showmax original Nigerian telenovela series Wura.

== Career ==
He appeared in first, second, and third season of the television series Wura. In the fourth season, Korede Soyinka took over the role of Olumide Kuti.

== Filmography ==
=== TV series ===
| Year | TV Series | Role | Notes |
|---|---|---|---|
| 2023-2025 | Wura | Olumide "Cobra" Kuti | Telenovela |

== Awards and nominations ==
| Year | Award | Category | Recipient | Result | Ref |
|---|---|---|---|---|---|
| 2022 | Best of Nollywood Awards | Best Actor in a Lead Role (Yoruba) | Himself for God of Thunder | Nominated | |
| 2022 | Best of Nollywood Awards | Revelations of the Year (Male) | Himself for God of Thunder | Won | |
| 2022 | Best of Nollywood Awards | Best Actor in a Support Role (Yoruba) | Himself for Kingie | Nominated | |
