= Dazzling Mirage =

2014 film by Tunde Kelani

- Film poster
- Directed by: Tunde Kelani
- Screenplay by: Ade Solanke
- Based on: Dazzling Mirage by Olayinka Abimbola Egbokhare
- Produced by: Tunde Kelani
- Starring: Kemi 'Lala' Akindoju; Kunle Afolayan; Bimbo Manuel; Yomi Fash Lanso; Taiwo Ajai-Lycett; Seun Akindele; Aderounmu Adejumoke
- Cinematography: Sarafa Abagun; Seun Sonoiki
- Edited by: Mumin Kelani
- Music by: Michael Ogunlade
- Production companies: Mainframe Film and Television Productions
- Distributed by: FilmOne Distributions
- Release dates: 9 October 2014 (New Zealand); 7 November 2014 (Muson Centre); 20 February 2015
- Running time: 90 minutes
- Country: Nigeria
- Language: English
- Box office: ₦13,000,000

Dazzling Mirage is a 2014 Nigerian drama film, produced and directed by Tunde Kelani; it stars Kemi "Lala" Akindoju, Kunle Afolayan, Bimbo Manuel, Yomi Fash Lanso, Taiwo Ajai-Lycett and Seun Akindele. It also features special appearances from Adewale Ayuba, Sean Tizzle, Tunde Babalola and Steve Sodiya. The film is an adaptation of a novel of the same name by Olayinka Abimbola Egbokhare, adapted to screen by Ade Solanke. It tells the story of a young sickle-cell patient and the various social and emotional challenges she is faced with.

== Cast ==
- Kemi 'Lala' Akindoju as Funmiwo
- Seun Akindele as Sanya
- Kunle Afolayan as Dotun
- Taiwo Ajai-Lycett as Sanya's Mum
- Bimbo Manuel as Dr. Femi/Funmiwo's Dad
- Yomi Fash Lanso as Lanre
- Carol King as Lola/Funmiwo's Mum
- Khabirat Kafidipe as Tade
- Aderounmu Adejumoke as Yejide
- Bukola Awoyemi as Bukola
- Ayo Badmus as Mr. Odusina
- Tunji Afolayan as Kunle
- Adewale Ayuba as Adewale Ayuba (special appearance)
- Sean Tizzle as Sean Tizzle (special appearance)
- Collins Enebeli as
- Tunde Babalola as
- Hakeem Adenekan as
- Steve Sodiya as

== Production ==
It was announced in March 2012, just after the theatrical release of Maami, that Kelani would be adapting Olayinka Abimbola's Dazzling Mirage to the big screen. As of January 2013, the adaptation was confirmed to have commenced. Kelani believes the film to be his way of contributing towards public awareness of genotype-related issues like sickle-cell anaemia, hoping young couples would pay attention to its importance. He states: "all of us are connected directly or indirectly to the sufferers of this ailment"; "I have also had personal relationships with sufferers of this ailment and I consider it my responsibility to bring their story to fore." Kemi Akindoju had her screen test on 12 June 2013 and principal photography commenced on 18 September 2013.

== Release ==
A promotional poster of Dazzling Mirage was unveiled on 24 June 2013; Onset pictures were also constantly released to the public during the course of filming. The first trailer for the film was released to the public on 1 December 2013 and a second trailer was released on 14 February 2014. The first official poster, together with a third trailer was released on 18 June 2014, ahead of the 2014 World Sickle-cell Awareness Day. The film screened at the Nollywood Film Festival in New Zealand; it premiered on 7 November 2014 at the Muson Centre, Lagos, and was generally released theatrically on 20 February 2015.

== Accolades ==
Dazzling Mirage has been nominated in the "Best Costume Design" category at the 2015 Africa Magic Viewers Choice Awards.

== See also ==
- Sickle-cell anaemia
