= Lagbaja =

Nigerian musician and singer-songwriter

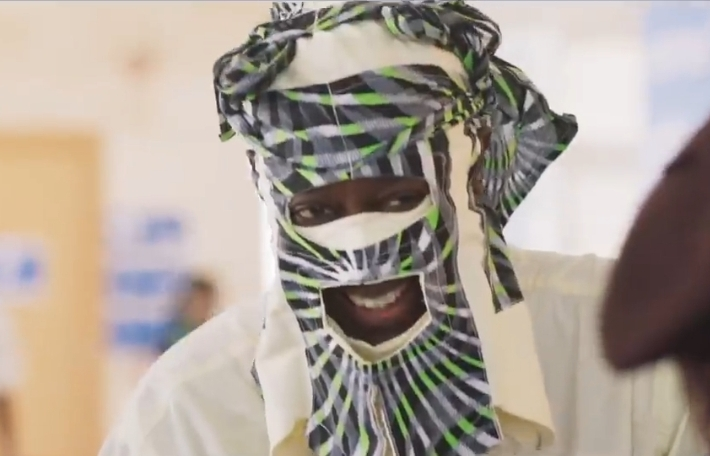

Background information
- Born: Bisinuade Ologunde
- Genre: Afrobeat
- Occupations: Singer-songwriter, instrumentalist, founder of Opatradikoncept
- Instruments: Saxophone; Percussion; vocals
- Years active: 1975–present

Bisade Ologunde (in Lagos, 1960) is a Nigerian afrobeat musician, singer-songwriter and percussionist. Widely known as Lágbájá for his signature use of masks which cover his identity. He believes in social reform through music.

== Early life and career ==
Ologunde adopted the name Lágbájá (a generic name roughly meaning "Jane Doe" or "John Doe"- A person whose name, identity is intentionally concealed in Yoruba) as he embarked on his career in the early 90s. His name was reflected in his choice of stage attire – a slit textile and rubber mask adopted so that the artist represented the ‘common man’ in keeping with the carnival tradition of Yoruba Culture. He formed his first small band in 1991 in Lagos after he had taught himself to play the saxophone. With a high quotient of percussion instruments including congas and talking drums, Lagbaja's album We Before Me (IndigeDisc/PDSE), released in 2000, demanded honesty from politicians and urged brotherhood and unity. He shared lyrics of his songs with a backup singer, Ego Ihenacho, and equally plays tenor saxophone. With a firm, brawny tone akin to that of John Coltrane and Pharoah Sanders, he emblazoned the melodies of the songs, sometimes with Ego scat-singing along.

== Awards ==
- 2006 Channel O Music Video Awards – Best Male Video ("Never Far Away")

== Discography ==
- 'Ikira', 1993
- Lagbaja, 1993
- Cest Un African Thing, 1996
- ME, 2000
- WE, 2000
- We and Me Part II, 2000
- ABAMI, 2000
- Africano... the mother of groove, 2005
- Paradise, 2009
- Sharp Sharp, 2009
- 200 Million Mumu (The Bitter Truth), 2012

== See also ==
- List of Yoruba people
