= Hex (2015 film) =

2015 film directed by Clarence Peters

- Theatrical poster
- Directed by: Clarence Peters
- Written by: Clarence Peters; Rotimi Oshodi; Victor Aghahowa
- Based on: Hex by Leo Garen
- Produced by: Clarence Peters
- Starring: Ayoola Ayoola; Kunle Remi; Nancy Isime; Roseline Afije Liquorose; Scarlet Shotade
- Cinematography: Clarence Peters
- Music by: Phyno; Chidinma; Illbliss
- Production company: CAPital Dreams Pictures
- Release date: 12 November 2015 (Nigeria)
- Running time: 26 minutes
- Country: Nigeria
- Language: English

Hex is a 2015 Nigerian horror short film directed by Clarence Peters. Screened and premiered on 12 November 2015 at the 5th Africa International Film Festival, Hex went on to win the award for "Best Short Film" at the same event.

== Background ==
Hex is the debut movie of Clarence Peters. Shot in Lagos with a total runtime of 26 minutes, the official trailer of the movie was released on 28 September 2015.

== Cast ==
- Ayoola Ayolola as Olabode
- Kunle Remi as Emeka
- Nancy Isime as Chioma
- Roseline Afije (Liquorose) as Bola
- Scarlet Shotade as Abiodun
- Rotimi Oshodi as Hooded Man

== Awards and accolades ==
Year	Award ceremony	Prize	Result
2015	5th Africa International Film Festival	Best Short Film	Won
