= Ade Solanke =

British playwright and screenwriter

Adeola Solanke
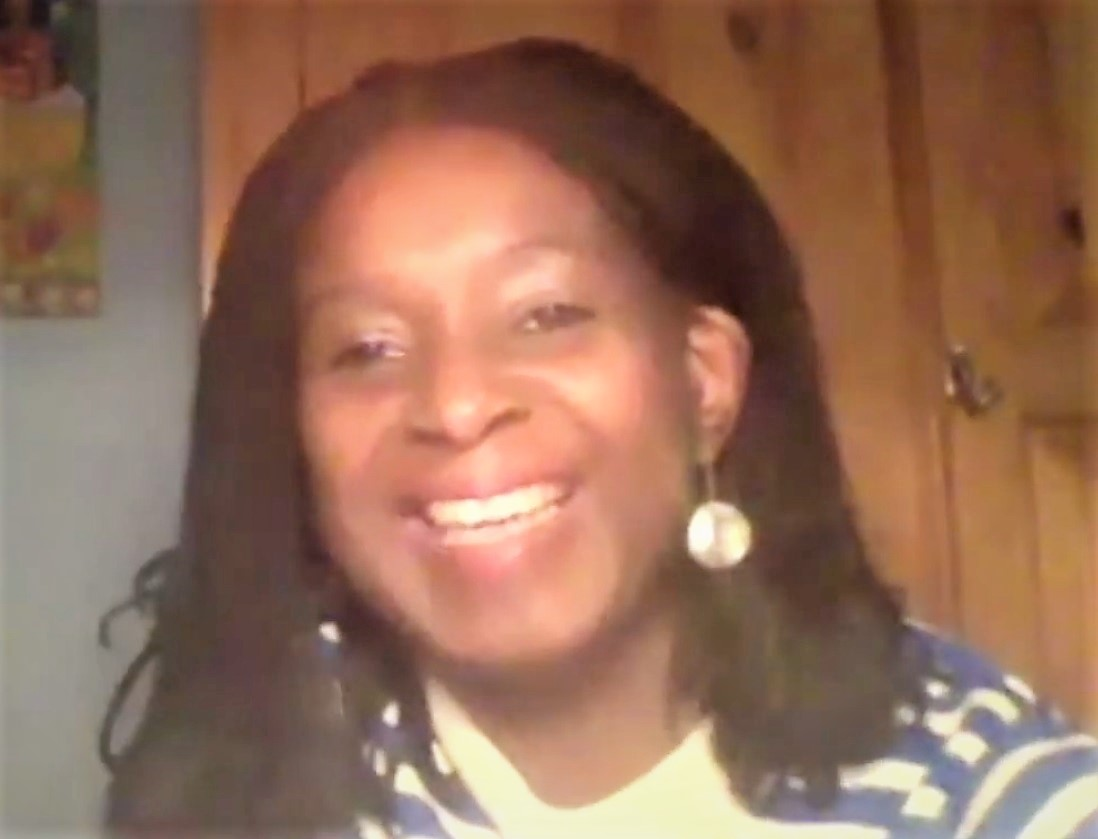
- Solanke in 2020 discussing the anthology New Daughters of Africa, to which she contributed.
- Born: London, UK
- Other name: Ade Solanke
- Education: University of Southern California School of Cinematic Arts; Goldsmiths, University of London; University of Sheffield
- Occupations: Playwright, screenwriter, arts journalist
- Employer: University of Greenwich
- Notable work: Pandora's Box (2012); East End Boys, West End Girls (2015)
- Website: sporastories.com

Adeola Solanke FRSA, commonly known as Ade Solanke, is a British playwright and screenwriter. She is best known for her debut stage play, Pandora's Box, which was produced at the Arcola Theatre in 2012, and was nominated for the Offie for Best New Play. Her other writing credits include the award-winning BBC Radio drama series Westway and the Nigerian feature film Dazzling Mirage (2014). She is the founder and creative director of the company Spora Stories, whose aim is to "create original drama for stage and screen, telling the dynamic stories of the African diaspora." Solanke has previously worked as an arts journalist and in radio and television, and in 1988 set up Tama Communications, offering a writing and publicity service, whose clients included the BBC, the Arts Council and the Midland Bank.

== Early years and education ==
Born to Nigerian parents in London, Ade Solanke was brought up with her three sisters in Ladbroke Grove and Notting Hill, in the west of the capital. She earned an MFA in Screenwriting from the University of Southern California School of Cinematic Arts, where she was a Fulbright Scholar and Phi Beta Kappa international scholar. She also has a postgraduate diploma in creative writing from Goldsmiths, University of London, and an honours degree in English literature from the University of Sheffield.

== Career ==
She worked as a story analyst for several Hollywood companies, including Sundance, New Line and Disney. Her first screenplay, Femi’s Thirtieth, was a semi-finalist in the annual Nicholl screenwriting contest in Los Angeles. It was also a semi-finalist in the Amblin/Chesterfield Screenwriting contest, also in LA. Her second screenplay, Finishing School, also reached the Nicholl semi-finals. For some years she worked as an arts journalist, writing for publications including The Times Literary Supplement, The Voice, The Guardian, the New Statesman and West Africa Magazine. In 1988 she set up Tama Communications, a writing, research and publicity service "sympathetic to the needs of the voluntary sector and black organisations", that was judged an "outstanding enterprise" and won the London's Top Youth Enterprise title in the 1989 London Livewire competition to find the best young business brains. She has also taught at several universities, among them Goldsmiths, University of London, and Pan-African University, Lagos, Nigeria, as well as at such institutions as London's City Lit and in Zimbabwe at the Institute of Creative Arts for Progress in Africa. In 2015, she joined the University of Greenwich, where she is a senior lecturer in Creative Writing.

Her work for radio includes being on the writing team of the award-winning BBC drama series Westway. In 2009 she was commissioned by the NHS to write Family Legacy, a Nollywood-style film drama drawing on the real-life experiences of people living with sickle-cell disease, which has been disseminated widely on television channels and elsewhere in the UK, USA and West Africa, reaching more than 12 million people in outreach campaigns. She subsequently wrote the screenplay for Dazzling Mirage (2014), adapted from the novel of the same name by Olayinka Abimbola Egbokhare, produced and directed by Tunde Kelani.

=== Pandora's Box ===
Solanke's first stage play to be produced, Pandora's Box, which was initially showcased in July 2008 as part of Tiata Fahodzi's Tiata Delights at the Almeida Theatre, had its world premiere and sold-out shows at the Arcola Theatre, Hackney, in 2012, subsequently touring nationally in 2014 to 16 venues around the UK, the largest-ever tour for a black play in the UK. "An exuberant and thought-provoking mix of comedy, tragedy and family drama", Pandora's Box deals with the dilemma of a British-Nigerian mother, on holiday in Lagos with her streetwise son, about whether to leave him in a strict Nigerian boarding-school or bring him back to the battlefields of inner-city London.

The play won five-star reviews and was praised as "Honest, simple, enthralling … absolutely brilliant" (The Public Reviews) and "Firecracker theatre … touching … hilarious" (The Stage). Reviewing it for The Guardian, Lyn Gardner wrote: "Pandora's Box buzzes with life and the tensions of real people struggling to make the best of their lives while dealing with the legacies left from the choices made by a previous generation." Another of several positive notices came from Sarah Lewis of the Hackney Citizen, who described the play as "At times laugh out loud funny, at times heartbreaking....essentially a very moving and funny play. Excellent." Pandora's Box is published by Oberon Books.

=== East End Boys, West End Girls ===
In 2015, Solanke made her directorial debut with her second play, East End Boys, West End Girls, in a London tour that began at the Arcola Theatre before playing in venues including CLF Arts Cafe in Peckham, the Saatchi Gallery in Chelsea, and the Bernie Grant Arts Centre in Tottenham. Reviews variously described the play as "a grim view of a vast and disparate city...occasionally quite sweet and always earnest" and "thought-provoking.... It goes beyond mere entertainment and poses some knotty but ever pertinent questions. The artful Solanke handles the social commentary with sensitivity and intelligence."

=== The Court Must Have a Queen ===
Solanke's latest play is The Court Must Have a Queen about Henry VIII's marriage to Anne of Cleves. It features African Tudor musician John Blanke, who played in the courts of both Henry VII and Henry VIII and is the first black person for whom there is both an image and a record in the UK. The play was commissioned by Historic Royal Palaces and produced by Hampton Court Palace. It premiered in June 2018, performed in the Great Hall at Hampton Court Palace, where Shakespeare's acting company the King's Men performed in 1603.

=== Other projects ===
Solanke is also developing a project and play about Phillis Wheatley entitled Phillis in London, which was showcased at the Greenwich Book Festival in 2018. A 90-minute play by Solanke titled Phillis in Boston was presented at the Old South Meeting House in November 2023.

Solanke is a contributor to the 2019 anthology New Daughters of Africa edited by Margaret Busby.

== Works ==
Theatre

- Pandora's Box (2012)
- East End Boys, West End Girls (2015)
- The Court Must Have a Queen (2018)

Film

- The Family Legacy (2009)
- Dazzling Mirage (2014)

== Awards and recognition ==
In 1989, Ade Solanke was named London's Top Youth Entrepreneur for her writing and media business, Tama Communications. In September 2012 she won the award for Best Playwright at the Nigerian Entertainment and Lifestyle Awards. She also won Best Playwright at the Afro-Hollywood Awards.

During the 2012 London Olympics she was featured along with other writers, including Diran Adebayo, Sefi Atta, Helon Habila, Zainabu Jallo, Nnorom Azuonye, Chibundu Onuzo, and Rotimi Babatunde, at the Nigeria House Literature Showcase curated by the Committee for Relevant Art (CORA) at the Theatre Royal, Stratford East.

- 2012: Pandora's Box Winner, Best Playwright, Afro-Hollywood Awards
- 2012: Pandora's Box Winner, Best Play, Nigerian Entertainment and Lifestyle (NEL) Awards
- 2012: Pandora's Box nominated for Best New Play for the Offie
- 2014: Pandora's Box nominated for the 2014 Nigeria Prize for Literature.
- 2015: East End Boys, West End Girls Winner, Best Play at the 7th Black Entertainment, Film, Fashion, Television and Arts Awards.
- 2015: Pandora's Box and East End Boys, West End Girls nominated for the 2015 Alfred Fagon Audience Award.
- 2016: Presented with the Professor Robert Boucher Distinguished Alumni Award by University of Sheffield.

Solanke is also the recipient of various academic scholarships and literary awards, including:

- 1992: Fulbright Scholarship
- 1993: Phi Beta Kappa International Scholarship
- 1993: Association of American University Women (AAUW) Scholarship
- 1994: Norman Topping Scholarship (USC)
- 2001: Royal Literary Fund Fellowship (BFI writer-in-residence)
- 2010: Pinter Centre AHRC artist-in-residence, Goldsmiths, University of London
- 2010: Peggy Ramsay Award
- 2013: Peggy Ramsay Award
