= Rogers Ofime =

Nigerian film producer

- Born: Rogers Ofime; 10 March 1973 (age 53); Lagos State, Nigeria
- Occupation: Film Producer/Director
- Years active: 2001 – present

Rogers Ofime (born March 10, 1973) is a Nigerian born Canadian based film maker and television producer. He is best known for producing several notable Nigerian television soap operas, including the successful Tinsel, which was the first multi-camera studio based television daily soap to be produced by a Nigerian producer in all of East, West or North Africa and more recently Hush.

== Early life ==
Ofime was born in Lagos, Nigeria. In May 1985, he graduated from St. Paul's Primary School in Lagos, Nigeria and then went on to Iponri Grammar School in Lagos in June 1991 for his secondary school education. After his secondary education, in May 1994 he obtained a Certificate in Drama from the Obafemi Awolowo University in Osun State, southwest Nigeria and another Certificate in Music from the same university in May 1996.

In July 2000 Ofime graduated with a Bachelor of Arts (2nd Class Lower) B.A. Dramatic Arts from the Obafemi Awolowo University, Osun state, Nigeria. In October 2004 he obtained a Masters of Arts (PhD Grade) MA Theatre Arts from the University of Ibadan, Oyo state, Nigeria. In 2016, he graduated from Robertson College in Canada with a certificate in Business Administration. He then enrolled for a PHD at the Lagos State University, Lagos State, Nigeria.

Growing up, Ofime looked up to mentors such as Erika Klopper, Desiree Markgraaf, Tade Ogidan, Richard Mofe Damijo, and would grow to become a fan of Steven Spielberg and Tyler Perry. He had his first opportunity given to him by Tade Ogidan, a foremost Nigerian director. But the opportunity that led to his breakthrough in the television and film industry was given to him by Erika Klopper. According to Ofime, "She believed in me when everyone doubted my ability to deliver a studio based multi-cam daily series."

== Career ==
In 2001, Ofime began producing movies, television series and commercials as a television production manager in Lagos, Nigeria and by 2005, Ofime took a job with South Africa-based Film Company, Sky Sweeper Films. In his time there, Ofime produced his first set of television commercial projects, which enjoyed notable success.

In 2007, Ofime was head hunted by top South African media company M-net and was commissioned to produce a daily soap opera Tinsel on the M-net/Africa Magic platform. While working on Tinsel, he worked with a 120-member film crew, 15 recurring actors and 500 supporting actors. The show went on to become one of the most viewed television series in Africa, viewed by millions and syndicated across 48 African countries on satellite and local television stations. It also made him the first Nigerian producer to produce a multi-camera, studio-based daily television soap opera in West, North and East Africa.

In 2013, Ofime was mandated by M-net to develop a Tele-film initiative by putting together a team of 120 film-makers to produce at least 80 tele-films in 2013, 60 films in 2014 and 40 in 2015. The movie project initiative, which was successful is called the Africa Magic Original Films (AMOF) project.

Ofime relocated to Winnipeg, Manitoba, Canada and set up his own production company, Theatron Media Incorporated and has worked alongside several notable film producers and directors including Tade Ogidan, Erika Klopper, Juliette Hagopian, Robert Peters, Curtis Graham, Steve Morrisson and Titus Orpen.

Ofime is the Executive Producer at Native Media TV, a production company, under which platform he produced the series, "Zone 222" and "Till You Are 16" for Africa Magic TV.

In 2020, he produced a movie titled "Voiceless". A movie that focuses on the troubles faced by those living in the northern part of Nigeria.

== Personal life ==
Ofime is married to Olabimpe Ofime. They met in the university, and have been married since 2002. They have two children.

== Awards and recognition ==
At the 2017 Africa Magic Viewers Choice Award (AMVCA), a movie he produced, Oloibiri, was named Best Movie West Africa. The movie is story of the historic town where Nigeria's first commercial oil discovery was made by Shell Darcy in June 1956, and starring Nigerian great actors like Olu Jacobs and Richard Mofe Damijo, Oloibiri beat A Trip to Jamaica, 76, 93 Days and The CEO to win the award.

In May 2015, Ofime was honoured with a plaque by the National Association of the Nigerian Theatre Arts Practitioners, NANTAP, as a certified thespian for his commitment to the development of arts and culture in Nigeria.

A list of Ofime's awards include

- Best Sitcom, AMVCA 2017 - The Johnsons
- Best actor in Drama, AMVCA 2017 - Hotel Majestic
- Best Actress in drama, AMVCA 2017 - Hush
- Best actor in Comedy, AMVCA 2017 - The Johnsons
- Best actress (Gold award) International independent film awards Los Angeles - Price of Spice
- Merit award (Best short film), California, USA - One out of Several
- Best Movie West Africa, AMVCA 2017 - Oloibiri
- 'Best Foreign Film' Award, 2016 San Diego Black Film Festival, USA - Oloibiri
- 'Best Film' in Water Category', 2016 Green Me Global Festival for Sustainability, Lagos - Oloibiri
- Homevida 2016 Award for Feature Film category promoting Transparency, Accountability and Good Governance - Oloibiri
- 'Best Film' Award, 2015 NAFCA, Los Angeles - Oloibiri
- 'Best Screenplay' Award, 2015 NAFCA, Los Angeles - Oloibiri
- The Audio Visual Award (TAVA) for the outstanding producer for 2011 - Tinsel
- Best TV series (English) City People Awards 2017- The Johnsons
- Best Sitcom Nigerian Teen Choice Awards 2016 - The Johnsons
- Best TV sitcom Naija 102.7FM comedy Awards 2017 - The Johnsons
- Best TV sitcom Naija 102.7FM comedy Awards 2018 - The Johnsons
- Best TV series African Youth Choice Awards 2015 - Hotel Majestic
- Best TV series Tava Awards 2010 - Tinsel
- Best Feature Narrative Long Film, American Golden Picture International Film Festival - Make Room
- Best Cinematography, American Golden Picture International Film Festival - Make Room
- Best Editing, American Golden Picture International Film Festival - Make Room
- Best Screenplay, American Golden Picture International Film Festival - Honourable Mention
- Best Picture, Universal Movie Awards 2021 - Voiceless
- Best Director, Universal Movie Awards 2021 - Voiceless
- Best Screenplay, Universal Movie Awards 2021 - Voiceless
- Best Film Edit, Universal Movie Awards 2021 - Voiceless

== Filmography ==
=== Feature films ===
Year	Title	Role	Director	Notes
2013	Hotel Rush	Producer	Patience Oghre Imobhio	MNET Original Film
2013	Fifth	Producer	Ehizojie Ejesebholo	MNET Original Film
2013	Roadside	Producer	Ehizojie Ejesebholo	MNET Original Film
2013	Kopa	Producer		MNET Original Film
2013	The Room	Producer	Patience Oghre Imobhio	MNET Original Film
2013	Complicated	Producer	Solomon Macaulay	MNET Original Film
2013	Kin	Producer	Patience Oghre Imobhio	MNET Original Film
2013	Prodigal	Producer	Ehizojie Ejesebholo	MNET Original Film
2013	Moving On	Producer	Alex Mouth	MNET Original Film
2013	Homecoming	Producer	Ehizojie Ejesebholo/Patience Oghre Imobhio	MNET Original Film
2013	Olive Branch	Producer	Alex Mouth	MNET Original Film
2013	A Shot in the Foot	Producer	Solomon Macaulay	MNET Original Film
2013	Buffon	Producer	Patience Oghre Imobhio	MNET Original Film
2013	Spinsters	Producer	Ehizojie Ejesebholo/Solomon Macaulay	MNET Original Film
2013	Night Raid	Producer	Alex Mouth	MNET Original Film
2013	This House is not for Sale	Producer	Ehizojie Ejesebholo	MNET Original Film
2013	Target	Producer	Alex Mouth	MNET Original Film
2013	Secret Lives of Yahoo Boys	Producer	Ehizojie Ejesebholo	MNET Original Film
2013	Undertaking	Producer	Patience Oghre Imobhio	MNET Original Film
2014	Scarlet	Producer	Patience Oghre Imobhio	MNET Original Film
2016	Oloibiri	Producer	Curtis Graham	A Right Angle & Theatron Media Production
2018	Zero Hour	Executive Producer	Robert Peters	Native Media Production
2018	Mugabe	Executive Producer	Robert Peters	Eastgate Production
2020	Voiceless	Executive Producer	Robert Peters	Native Media/Theatron Media/White Media
2021	Kanaani	Producer	Tola Olatunji	RAS Films/Native Media

=== Major television series ===
Year	Title	Role	Director	Notes
2006 - 2015	Tinsel (1,500 Episodes)	Producer	Various	MNET TV Series
2011 - date	The Johnsons (1892 Episodes)	Executive Producer	Various	MNET TV Series
2015	Till You Are 16 (13 Episodes)	Executive Producer	Various	Theatron Media
2015 - 2016	Hotel Majestic (260 Episodes)	Executive Producer	Various	MNET TV Series
2016 - 2017	Hush (260 Episodes)	Executive Producer	Various	MNET TV Series
2019	The Mystic River (Nigerian Series) 26 Episodes)	Executive Producer	Various	Native Media
2018 - date	Coloré (52 Episodes)	Director	Rogers Ofime	Native Media/Theatron Media/Mugosa Media
2023 - till date	Wura	Executive producer	Drama	Native Media

=== Short films ===
Year	Title	Role	Director	Notes
2015	One out of several	Producer/Director	Rogers Ofime	Theatron Media Production
2015	Liberated	Producer/Director	Rogers Ofime	Native Media Production
2015	With Love	Producer/Director	Rogers Ofime	Theatron Media Production
2016	Price of Spice	Producer/Director	Rogers Ofime	Theatron Media/Native Media Production
2016	Date	Producer/Director	Rogers Ofime	Theatron Media Media Production
2018	The End	Director	Rogers Ofime	Native Media Production
2018	Bridges	Director	Rogers Ofime	Native Media Production
2018	Cover Up	Director	Rogers Ofime	Native Media Production

=== Documentaries ===
Year	Title	Role	Director	Notes
2003	Peter Odili	Production Manager	Tade Ogidan	OGD Pictures
2004	Ashaka Cement (LFT Day)	Production Manager	Owolabi Odesola	Cross Craft
2005	Unilever: Touching Lives	Production Manager	Owolabi Odesola	Cross Craft
2005	Coca-Cola	Production Manager	Owolabi Odesola	Cross Craft
2009	Diary of a Legend	Producer		MNET Africa
2017	Voiceless	Director	Rogers Ofime	Native Media Production
2017	Never Again	Director	Rogers Ofime	Theatron Media Production
2017	Restoration: A Refugee story	Director	Rogers Ofime	Mugbosa Media/Theatron Media Production

=== Reality Television ===
Year	Title	Role	Director	Notes
2007	The Intern	Line Producer	Tade Ogidan	Reality TV Competition produced for Bank PHB
2008	Project Fame	Production Manager	Hydei Uys	Production for Endemol
