= Modesinuola Ogundiwin =

Nigerian Actress

Modesinuola
- Ogundiwin at the 2026 Toronto International Film Festival.
- Born: Modesinuola Ogundiwin; Lagos, Nigeria
- Citizenship: Nigeria
- Education: The Vale College
- Alma mater: Afe Babalola University
- Occupation: Actress
- Years active: 2016–present
- Notable work: Wura
- Title: 2016 Next Movie Star Winner
- Relatives: Mowasinuola Ogundiwin (sis)

Modesinuola Ogundiwin is a Nigerian actress, known for her role as Kanyinsola Adeleke on the Showmax original Nigerian telenovela series Wura. On 24 December 2016, she was announced as the winner of the 12th edition of the Next Movie Star reality show.

== Early life and career ==
Modesinuola Ogundiwin hails from Ogun State, Nigeria. She has a twin sister named Mowasinuola. In 2015, she began her career as an entertainment blogger; reviewing music and movies. Before 2016, she was inactive and participated in the Next Movie Star, a talent discovery show for aspiring actors. In the same year, she emerged as the winner of the 12th edition of the show. In 2018, she made her Nollywood debut with Trauma, a film she also produced.

In 2021, she made her acting debut in Iwa Eda, a Rok Studios TV drama. Later that year, she joined the third season of Rumour Has It, a drama series produced by Ndani TV, where she played the role of Amara. In 2023, she was cast in Wura, a Showmax original telenovela, where she played the role of Kanyinsola Adeleke. Following her role in Wura, she became a controversial topic by fans of the series, due to her resemblance to the lead actress Scarlet Gomez, who played Wura.

On 8 July 2023, Modesinuola starred in Romoke's Demon, a Rok Studios TV drama that premiered on Rok2.

== Filmography ==
=== TV series ===
| Year | TV Series | Role | Notes |
|---|---|---|---|
| 2023 | Wura | Kanyinsola Adeleke | Telenovela |
| 2023 | Refuge | Oyiza Majekodunmi | Drama |
| 2021 | Rumour Has It | Amara | Drama |
| 2021 | Okoto: The series | Hadiza | Drama |

=== Films ===
| Year | Film | Role | Notes |
|---|---|---|---|
| 2024 | My Fake Celebrity Boyfriend | Tomisin | Comedy |
| 2023 | Romoke's Demon | | Drama |
| 2021 | Iwa Eda | | Drama |
| 2018 | Trauma | Producer | Drama |
