= Yomi Fash Lanso =

Nigerian actor (born 1968)

Yomi Fash-Lanso
- Born: Oluyomi Fash Lanso; 7 June 1968 (age 58); Ogun State, Nigeria
- Education: Business Administration, University of Lagos
- Alma mater: University of Lagos
- Occupation: Actor
- Notable work: Omo Elemosho

Yomi Fash-Lanso (born 7 June 1968) is a Nigerian actor.

== Early life ==
Yomi Fash-Lanso was born on 7 June 1968, in Ogun State Nigeria, as Oluyomi Fash Lanso.

== Career ==
He earned a degree in Business Administration from the University of Lagos. He acts mostly in Yoruba language films and has more than 100 films to his credit. In 2014, he was nominated for Africa Movie Academy Award for Best Actor in a Supporting Role at the 10th Africa Movie Academy Awards for his role in Omo Elemosho, the same year, he got the award for best actor in a supporting role for his role in Omo Elemosho, from NEA awards which were held in the US.

== Selected filmography ==
- Lepa Shandy (2002)
- Asiri Gomina Osomo (2003)
- Aje metta (2008) as Oladele
- Jenifa (2008) as Demola
- Idoti oju
- Opolo (2005) as Police
- Tani kin fe? (2005)
- Temidun (2005)
- Kadara Mi (2004) as Muyiwa
- Farayola (2009) as Irewole
- Omo Elemosho (2012) as Dr. Femi
- Dazzling Mirage (2014) as Lanre
- Professor JohnBull (2016) as Olaniyi Olaitan
- Obirin Isonu (2021)
- Citation (2020) as Lucien Legal Rep
- Osoronga (2023)
- Atunwa (2023)
- Akudaaya (2023)
- Wura (2023 TV Series) as Anthony Adeleke
- Lakatabu (2024)
- The Party (2025)
