= Carol King (actress) =

Nigerian actress (born 1963)

- Born: Caroline Eferamor King; 24 July 1963 (age 63); Lagos, Lagos State, Nigeria
- Education: Ahmadu Bello University; Lagos State University
- Occupations: Actress; presenter
- Years active: 1999–present
- Spouse: Kolawole King
- Children: Ikemefuna Nsolo (Son); Quddus King (Son); Oluwasoladegbin King (Daughter)

Carol King (born 24 July 1963) is a Nigerian actress, thespian and presenter best known for her role as "Jumoke" in the TV series Everyday People. Known for her "motherly role" in TV dramas, Carol has featured in several soap operas and movies including The Gods Are Still Not To Blame and Dazzling Mirage, a 2014 drama film directed by Tunde Kelani.

== Early life and education ==
Born in Lagos, in then Western Nigeria to Edo-born parents, Carol attended St. Soweto Primary School Lagos where she completed her basic education and Awori Anglican Comprehensive High School Lagos where she completed her secondary school education. She proceeded to obtain a Diploma in Insurance at Ahmadu Bello University before being awarded a bachelor's degree in Christian Religious Studies at Lagos State University.

== Personal life ==
Caroline King currently resides in Lagos State and is married to Captain Kolawole King, with whom she has two children. This is after her failed first marriage with Nsolo, with whom she has one child. On 3 November 2015, speaking with Motherhood In-Style Magazine, she unveiled the names of her children, as follows: “My first son is Ikem, Ikemefuna Nsolo, he’s 30. My second son is Abdulqudus King, we call him Qudus, he’s 22. My daughter, Sola King, her full names are Oluwasoladegbin King is 13.”

== Career ==
Carol's acting career began after she attended an audition for a radio drama titled I Need To Know before she went on to become a household name after her role in the TV series Everyday People. She has starred in several stage plays, dramas, and movies including Dazzling Mirage, Pasito Dehinde, and The Gods Are Still Not To Blame. In recognition for her role in the advancement of the film industry, Carol was awarded with "African Youth Role Model Award" in 2009.

== Selected filmography ==
=== Film ===
Year	Title	Role	Notes
2005	Pasito Dehinde		
2013	The Gods Are Still Not To Blame		
2012	Journey To Self	Stella	
2014	Dazzling Mirage	Lola	
2016	North East	Ifeoma Okafor	
2016	Beyond Blood		
2017	The Tribunal		
2021	A Naija Christmas	Deaconess Fakorede	
2022	Kofa	Mrs. Brillo	
2023	Ada Omo Daddy	Mrs. Ekpeyong	
2024	Soft Love	Mrs Obi	

=== Television ===
Year	Title	Role	Notes
1997	I Need to Know		
1999	Everyday People		
2006	Edge of Paradise	Asabe	
2008	Tinsel		
2012	Tales of Eve: A Step Too Far	Miriam	
2013	Emerald		
2016	Blaze of Glory		
2015	Skinny Girl In Transit		
2020	Eko Law		
2022	Far From Home	Principal Gemade	
2023	Wura		

=== Stage ===
Title	Role	Ref
V-Monologues		
Ajayi Crowther		
Five Maidens of Fadaka		
Prison Chronicles		
The Wives		
