= Ego (singer) =

Nigerian musician

Nwakaego Ihenacho Ogbaro, known professionally as Ego, is a Nigerian singer and songwriter. Ego has recorded songs such as "Konko Below", "Nothing for You" and "Never Far Away". She frequently went on a world tour with Lagbaja. Ego left Africano to pursue a solo career in 2007. She later formed a band called Indigo. Since leaving Lagbaja's band, she has collaborated with artistes like Sunny Neji, Djinee, Tosin Martins, Ayanbirin and Blaise, among others. She has also performed with Weird MC, Aṣa, Cobhams Asuquo and Yinka Davies. She released "I Believe", the lead single from her debut studio album. She was signed as a Globacom ambassador in 2008.

== Education ==
Ego attended Central Primary School and Ikeja High School, GRA in Lagos. She graduated from high school in 1991.

== See also ==
- African hip hop
- Nigerian hip hop
- Music of Nigeria
