= Scarlet Gomez =

Nigerian Actress

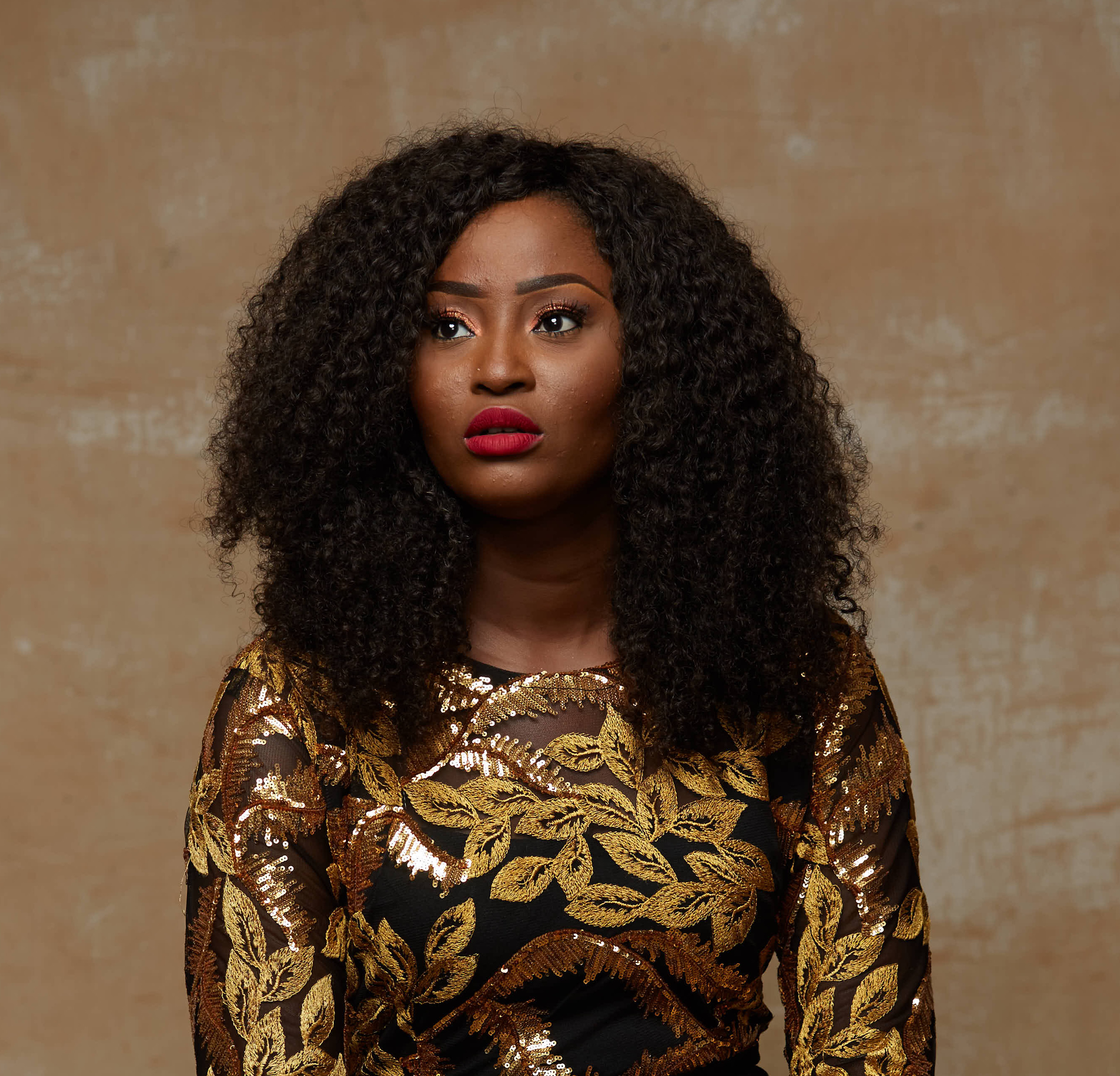
- In 2017
- Born: Gbemisola Scarlet Shotade; Lagos, Nigeria
- Citizenship: Nigeria
- Education: University of Lagos
- Occupations: Actress; Singer; Model; Beauty queen; Video vixen
- Notable work: Wura
- Title: 2012 Miss United Nations Tourism Pageant
- Spouse: Temi Gomez (m. 2017)
- Father: Toks Shotade
- Musical career
- Genres: Afrobeats; R&B; soul
- Instrument: Vocals
- Years active: 2013–present
- Label: Knighthouse Entertainment

Gbemisola Scarlet Shotade professionally known as Scarlet Gomez, is a Nigerian actress, known for her lead role in the 2023 Showmax Original telenovela-series Wura. In 2012, she won the Miss United Nations Tourism pageant in Kingston, Jamaica.

== Early life and career ==
Gbemisola Scarlet Shotade was born in Surulere, Lagos, to Nigerian parents. Her father, Adetokunbo Shotade, also known as “Toks” Shotade, was a music producer and sound engineer who influenced her early interest in music. Shotade attended Princeton School for her primary education and Ogunlade College for her secondary education before obtaining a bachelor's degree in Business Administration from the University of Lagos. She competed in several beauty pageants, including Miss Nigeria, Most Beautiful Girl in Nigeria and Miss Global Nigeria, finishing as first runner-up in the latter competition.

In 2012, she won the Miss United Nations Tourism pageant held in Kingston, Jamaica. The following year, she ventured briefly into the music industry as a Video vixen, appearing in "Love Song" by Timi Dakolo, "Eziokwu" by Lynxxx, "Bartender" by Naeto C and "Run My Race" by Burna Boy. Later that year, she released her debut single, "Catch Me", which was produced by DJ Klem, before subsequently transitioning into Nollywood.

In 2014, she made her acting debut in the Africa Magic original Scarlet.

In 2016, Gomez released her studio album The Scarlet Letter through Knighthouse Entertainment. In the same year, she was recruited by Africa Magic to join the cast of the M-Net drama series My Flatmates.

On 4 January 2023, Showmax announced Gomez as the lead actor of its first Nigerian telenovela series Wura, which premiered on 23 January 2023. On 16 April 2023, Wura earned Gomez a nomination at the 2023 Africa Magic Viewers' Choice Awards, in the Best Actress in a Drama, Movie or TV Series category. On 20 May 2023, Gomez lost the AMVCA award to Osas Ighodaro for her role in Man of God.

In 2026, Gomez starred in the romantic drama film Somewhere Near Love (SNL), alongside Bimbo Manuel, Iremide Adeoye, Ronke Oshodi, Fisayo Fosudo and Seyi Ademeso.

== Personal life ==
On 15 April 2017, Gomez married Temi Gomez, a Nigerian record producer. On 16 June 2019, they had their first child, Eli Gomez, who died three days later, and was buried the same day at Ikoyi.

== Filmography ==
=== Films ===
Year	Title	Role
2014	Scarlet	
2015	Hex	Biodun
2015	Doll House	Jumobi
2017	Side Chic Squad	Amaka
2017	The Demon in Me	
2018	Knockout Blessing	Bisola
2018	Sophia	
2018	Diana	
2018	Something Strange	Shalewa
2018	Stacy	Chinwe
2018	Zoe	
2019	The Big Fat Lie	Gwen
2019	Deep Cover	
2019	Love and a Tragedy	Ngozi
2020	A Perfect Girlfriend	
2020	Out of My League	Chioma
2020	Poker Face	Woman
2020	Season of the Vow	Valery
2020	What Other Couples Do	Zainab
2021	No Man's Land	Sharon
2021	You, Me, Us	Ifeoma
2021	Johnnie & Glyde	Glyde
2021	Blinded	Funmi
2022	A Masquerade Carnival in Lagos	Ireti
2022	She Is the One	Amarachi
2022	The Brightons	Mrs. Brighton
2022	Gigi's Wake	Ebiye
2022	Love Language	Osas
2022	Big Sister	Jennifer
2022	The Knot	Ella
2022	Cruise & Clout	
2022	Blunder	Molly
2022	Inside Life	
2022	Breakfast	
2022	You Who I Called Sister	Uyo
2022	Symphony	Arike
2022	Things We Do for Love	Ofure
2022	Happy Ending	Lilian
2023	Osas	
2023	In Your Heart	Annie
2023	Sorrow Gate	Fiona
2023	Ere Ife Mi	Eniola
2023	A Passionate Love Affair	Andrea
2023	wake Up	
2023	Thirst Trap	Doris
2023	Mend My Heart	Ashley
2024	Hell & Fury	
2025	Labake Olododo	
2025	Behind the Scenes	Aderonke Faniran
2026	The Return of Arinzo	

=== Television ===
Year	Title	Role	Notes
2017	My Flatmates	Fadeke	Comedy
2019	Getting Him to Kneel	Nancy	Drama
2022	Inside Life	Folashade	Drama
2023	Wura	Wura Amoo-Adeleke	Drama

== Awards and nominations ==
Year	Award	Category	Recipient	Result	Ref
2023	Africa Magic Viewers' Choice Awards	Best Actress in a Drama, Movie or TV Series	Herself for Wura	Nominated	
2023	Scream All Youth Awards	Best Actress in a lead role	Herself for Wura	Won	
2023	Scream All Youth Awards	Best Actress of the Year	Herself	Won	
2023	The Future Awards Africa	Prize for Acting	Herself	Nominated	
2026	Africa Magic Viewers' Choice Awards	Best Lead Actress	Behind The Scenes	Nominated	
