= 2012 Nigeria Entertainment Awards =

The 2012 Nigeria Entertainment Awards was the 7th edition of the ceremony. The event was held on September 2, 2012 at the Skirball Center for the Performing Arts, New York City. The event was hosted by Funke Akindele and Ayo Makun. Winners included Wizkid, Davido, Don Jazzy and Tineh Tempah.

== Awards ==
=== Music categories ===
Best Album of the Year

- Soul is Heavy - Nneka
- ELI - Ice Prince
- Superstar - Wizkid
- The Dreamer - SDC
- Beautiful Noise - Timi Dakolo
- Super Sun - Bez

Hottest Single of the Year

- "Ara" - Brymo
- "Oliver Twist" - D'banj
- "Pakurumo" - Wizkid
- "Dami Duro" - Davido
- "Chop My Money" - P-Square
- "Roll" - Rayce

Best New Act of the Year

- Tiwa Savage
- Brymo
- Davido
- Bez
- May D
- Chidinma

Gospel Artist/Group of the Year

- Segun Obe
- Tim Godfrey
- Eben
- Kore
- Lara George
- Vivien Stephen

Best Pop/R&B Artist of the Year

- Chidinma
- Omawumi
- Waje
- Tiwa Savage
- Wizkid
- Capital Femi

Best Rap Act of the Year

- Sauce Kid
- Ice Prince
- Vector
- Eva Alordiah
- M.I
- SDC

Best Music Producer of the Year

- Jesse Jagz
- Don Jazzy
- Shizzy
- Cobhams Asuquo
- Sarz
- Samklef

Best International Artist

- 2Kriss
- Kadija Kamara
- Tinie Tempah
- Skepta
- Abiade
- Tipsy

Best Music Video of the Year

- "Ara" - Brymo (Aje Filmworks)
- "Nawti" - Olu Maintain (Kehinde Naomi & Team Nawti)
- "She likes It" - Cap B (Adeola Alao)
- "My Home" - Nneka (Andy Amadi Okorafor)
- "Tete Lo Bere" - Jahbless (DJ Tee)
- "Pakurumo" - Wizkid (Clarence Peters)

Most Promising Act to Watch

- Eva Alordiah
- Chukky K
- Praiz
- Aires
- Flowssick
- Yung6ix
- Dammy Krane
- Eddie Kim

Pan African Artist or Group of the Year

- HHP
- Sarkodie
- Vivian Ndoyr
- Cabo Snoop
- Donaeo
- Noni Zondi

Best US based Artist of the Year

- Hoodbilli
- Bolade
- Awon Boyz
- Tolumide
- Duncan Daniels
- Jay Cube

Best Indigenous Artist/Group

- Timaya
- Flavour N'abania
- Aduke
- 9ice
- Bracket
- Jahbless

Best Collabo of the Year

- Sheyman Ft eLDee / Skales - "My Money remix"
- Saucekid ft Davido ("Carolina")
- Brackett ft Wizkid ("Girl")
- Bez ft Praiz ("That Stupid Song")
- Jeru ft Wizkid ("Familiarity")
- Ikechukwu ft Xela ("Bu Lie Oto")

=== Film categories ===
Best Actor in a Film

- Wale Ojo (Phone Swap)
- Joseph Benjamin (actor) (Mr. and Mrs.)
- Chet Anekwe (Unwanted Guest)
- Hakeem Kae Kazim (Man on Ground)
- Ramsey Nouah (Memories of my Heart)
- Pascal Atuma (Who is the Man)

Best Actress in a Film

- Uche Jombo (Damaged)
- Nse Ikpe Etim (Mr. and Mrs.)
- Funke Akindele (The Return of Jenifa)
- Tonto Dike (Private Enemy)
- Rita Dominic (Shattered (2011 film))
- Omotola Jalade Ekeinde (Ties That Bind)

Best Film Director

- Kunle Afolayan (Phone Swap)
- Tade Ogidan (Family on Fire)
- Tunde Kelani (Maami)
- Daniel Ademinokan (Unwanted Guest)
- Leila Djansi (Ties That Bind)
- Akin Omotoso (Man on Ground)

Best Picture

- The Young Smoker
- Inside Story
- Phone Swap
- Ties That Bind
- The Return of Jenifa
- Unwanted Guest

Best TV Show

- Nigerian Idol
- Jacob's Cross
- Tinsel
- Naija Sings
- City Sistas
- Big Brother Africa

Pan African Actor

- Kevin Ndege Mamboleo (Inside Story)
- Majid Michel (Somewhere in Africa)
- Van Vicker (Paparazzi)
- Chris Attoh (6 hours to Christmas)
- Edward Kagutuzi (The Mirror Boy)
- John Dumelo (Ties That Bind)

PAn African Actress

- Ama K. Abebrese (Ties That Bind)
- Yvonne Okoro (Single Six)
- Juliet Ibrahim (Crazy Scandal)
- Kudzai Sevenzo (Playing Warriors)
- Jokate Mwegelo (Chumo)
- Millicent Makheido (48)

=== Other categories ===
World DJ

- DJ Humility
- DJ Xclusive
- DJ Abass
- DJ Neptune
- DJ Jimmy Jatt
- DJ Mixmaster Brown
- DJ Flava
- DJ Dee Money

Best Comedian

- Seyi Law
- AY
- Julius Agwu
- Tee A
- Basketmouth
- Ali Baba

Best Entertainment Personality

- Dbanj
- eLDee
- Tonto Dike
- Genevieve Nnaji
- Funke Akindele
- 2Face Idibia
- Banky W
- Uti Nwachukwu

Entertainment Promoter

- Big Moose Ent
- Flytime TV
- Town Kries
- Industry Nite
- Cokobar
- Tiwaworks
- Posh Hill Ent
- Dejavu

Media Personality

- Toolz - The Beat 99.9 FM
- Adam - Sound City TV
- Freeze - Cool FM 96.9 FM
- Dolapo Oni - Mnet
- Uduak Uduok - Ladybrille
- Denrele - Channel O Africa

Entertainment Executive

- Audu Maikori
- eLDee
- Segun Demuren
- Efe Omoregie
- Obi Asika
- Ayo Shonaiya
