= Phone Swap =

Film dir. by Kunle Afolayan; starring Joke Silva ... [et al.]

- Theatrical poster
- Directed by: Kunle Afolayan
- Written by: Kemi Adesoye
- Produced by: Kunle Afolayan
- Starring: Nse Ikpe Etim; Wale Ojo; Joke Silva; Chika Okpala; Lydia Forson; Hafeez Oyetoro
- Cinematography: Yinka Edward; Alfred Chia
- Edited by: Yemi Jolaoso
- Music by: Truth
- Production company: Golden Effects Studios
- Distributed by: Golden Effects Pictures; Blue Pictures
- Release date: 30 March 2012
- Running time: 117 minutes 110 minutes (edited version)
- Country: Nigeria
- Languages: English; Yoruba; Igbo; Twi
- Budget: ₦60 million

Phone Swap is a 2012 Nigerian romance comedy-drama film written by Kemi Adesoye, directed and produced by Kunle Afolayan. It stars Nse Ikpe Etim, Wale Ojo, Joke Silva, Chika Okpala, Lydia Forson and Afeez Oyetoro, and focuses on a series of events unfolding when two polar opposites accidentally exchange phones. The film was conceived after a brief from an advertising agency to create a movie that would cut across ages 15 to 45. It received 4 nominations at the 8th Africa Movie Academy Awards which includes the category Best Nigerian Film and won the award Achievement in Production Design.

== Plot ==
Struggling fashion designer Mary Oyenokwe and arrogant businessman Akin Cole are handed the wrong phones after they collide at the airport. After parting, Akin receives a message on Mary's phone from her boss Alexis which reads "Enjoy your flight to Owerri". Thinking the message is from the similarly-named Alex - Akin's loyal but incompetent assistant - he books another ticket to Owerri. Mary, whose father has called her to act as a mediator at a family meeting, accidentally purchases a ticket to Abuja but realises her mistake after the flight attendant informs her the plane is actually headed for Abuja. Similarly, Akin discovers he has boarded the wrong flight but is already airborne.

Mary arrives in Abuja and calls her own number on Akin's phone; both are uncivil at first but agree to cooperate, and Akin suggests she stay with his free-spirited mother Kike, provided Mary delivers his phone's memory card containing valuable files to his company chairman at a business retreat. Believing Mary to be her son's girlfriend, the ecstatic Kike immediately warms towards her, and all Mary's attempts to explain fall on deaf ears. The pair bond over fashion, and Kike invites Mary to a get-together with friends the next day.

Meanwhile in Owerri, following an altercation with Mary's sister Cynthia, who is on police duty, Akin is taken to Mary's father's archaic and overcrowded bungalow in the town's hoi polloi district where Cynthia introduces Akin to their father, believing he is her sister's boyfriend. Akin struggles to adapt to their simple lifestyle, much to the family's amusement, but after Mary asks him to speak to her sister on her behalf, Cynthia agrees to turn a new leaf and control her temper for her children's sake. At the meeting Mary was supposed to mediate, Cynthia asks her in-laws for forgiveness (She had inflicted a penile injury on her husband during an argument), and they accept her apology.

Realising she has no suitable attire for a social occasion, Mary borrows the skirt she is still sewing, but notices the rightful owner - Alexis' customer - at Kike's party. Although the client is displeased, she approves of Mary's work and offers to recommend more clients. Akin and Mary call more frequently, thawing the previous frostiness. On the second day of the retreat where participants waste no time revealing their contempt for Akin, Mary comes face-to-face with Akin's uncouth Ghanaian ex-girlfriend Gina, who believes Mary has stolen Akin from her. Simultaneously, Mary's ex-boyfriend Tony unexpectedly arrives at Cynthia's father's house, ready to confront Akin. The two men come to blows just as Mary and Gina have their own physical brawl in Abuja, although onlookers separate the two women. Cynthia recognises Tony as the man who concealed his true marital status from her sister, and their twin brothers - Alpha and Omega - throw him out, warning him never to return.

A dishevelled Mary goes in search of Akin's new chairman who is revealed to be Kike; she had acquired the company shares to gain her son's attention after her alcoholism ruined their relationship. Akin is displeased with this, but his mother apologises for the past. Mary, who has now started her own fashion label Mary O, calls the stringent Alexis to hand in her resignation. At the airport, Akin and Mary finally meet in Lagos, they swap their phones. He helps her carry her luggage, and they both enter his car as the credits roll.

== Cast ==
- Nse Ikpe Etim as Mary Oyenokwe
- Wale Ojo as Akin Cole
- Joke Silva as Kike Cole
- Chika Okpala as Mary's Father
- Tyrone Evans Clark as Tyrone
- Ada Ameh as Cynthia
- Lydia Forson as Gina
- Chika Chukwu as Hussana
- Afeez Oyetoro as Alex Ojo
- Chris Iheuwa as Tony
- Charles Billion as Alpha
- Jay Jay Coker as Omega
- Jadesola Durotoye as C.E.O
- Sophia Chioma Onyekwo as Alexis
- Bose Oshin as Mrs Ibekwe
- Christopher John as Cynthia's husband
- Toyin Onormor as Tony's wife
- Jara as Seamstress 1
- Biola as Seamstress 2

== Production ==
=== Development ===
Phone Swap was conceived after a brief from an advertising agency, who were taking proposals on behalf of Samsung to create a movie that would cut across ages 15 to 45, and was shot in Lagos and made in partnership with Globacom and BlackBerry. It also got financial support from Meelk Properties, IRS Airlines, Seven-up Bottling Company, Honeywell Flour Mill and several others. The scripting stage for the film took two years, while the production and post production stages took six weeks and three months respectively. The film received critical acclaim and was highly successful at the box office. Ten scripts were submitted from different people and companies, but Afolayan's script eventually won the pitch. Although Samsung later dropped out of the project, Kunle Afolayan went ahead to solicit funds from other major sponsors as he was keen on concluding the project. Afolayan believed that although the film is not "arty" like The Figurine, it also had the potential of doing well at the box office because it is a commercial film. Afolayan however decided to steer clear of slapstick comedy, which had become a tradition for the comedy genre in Nollywood. He also stated at the press screening of the film in Lagos that the choice of a comedy genre is inline with the bid to diversify his production company; the previous two films from Golden Effects Studios had been thrillers, so Phone Swap was to show that his company was not running on a "one-way traffic". Kemi Adesoye and Afolayan came up with the story idea for the film; with the scripting stage taking a total period of two years.

Kunle Afolayan noted that investors were slow in responding to his business plan. However, the film eventually got financial support from telecommunication companies such as Globacom and BlackBerry. Some brands were also approached to take part in the production and Some of them did product placement. Such companies include: Meelk Properties, IRS Airlines, Seven-up Bottling Company, Berrys' Couture, Honeywell Flour Mill and Maclean. This helped subsidize the budget of the film by thirty to forty percent.

=== Casting ===
The lead male character, Akin was considered initially for Joseph Benjamin but he was later dropped when it was discovered that he had recently been paired as a couple with the signed lead actress Nse Etim for Mr. and Mrs., a film which was also in production at the time and was also released in March 2012. Jim Iyke was then called to play the role but he was unavailable at the time - shooting Last Flight to Abuja, so Wale Ojo eventually became the new lead actor. The character of Mary's father was slated for Sam Loco, who died on 7 August 2011 from an asthma attack before filming began. Chika Okpala, best-known for his role as Zebrudaya in The New Masquerade, was signed to replace the deceased actor, who was honoured by dedicating the film to his memory in the Opening credit of the film.

Ada Ameh and Nse Ikpe Etim, who are from Benue and Akwa Ibom respectively, were required to learn the Igbo dialect of Owerri for a period six months before the commencement of principal photography to fit into Cynthia and Mary characters, as both are portrayed as Owerri natives. Etim in an interview with Leadership Newspaper stated: "I am not exactly a rookie when it comes to the Igbo Language, but until Phone Swap I never needed to speak Igbo as a native would. I will admit that it was quite challenging, because I had to learn a specific dialect. I am very glad for the experience, though. Igbo is a very interesting language and I enjoyed myself immensely in the process of learning it".

Director, Afolayan, had a major dispute with Globacom, regarding the casting of Hafeez Oyetoro in the film. After seeing the first edit of the film, Mike Adenuga requested for Oyetoro to be dropped from the cast line up, and his scenes reshot with another actor. This was due to the fact that Oyetoro was at the time a brand ambassador for Etisalat Nigeria, a major competitor in the Nigerian telecommunication market. Afolayan however refused, with the belief that dropping Oyetoro would "kill" the film. As a result, Globacom partially withdrew its investment from the film and Afolayan's ambassadorial contract with the company was not renewed.

=== Filming ===
Filming began in Badagry in August, before moving to Lagos; the film was shot across six weeks and the post production took three months. According to Afolayan, the most challenging part of shooting was building the interior of the airplane and the airport scene which was shot for twenty four hours without a break; the airplane cabin was recreated in the studio by Pat Nebo and his team.

== Music and soundtrack ==
Phone Swap - O.S.T

Soundtrack album by Truth
- Released: 17 April 2012
- Genre: Film soundtrack
- Length: 16:30
- Label: Golden Effects Pictures
- Producer: Truth

Truth chronology
Phone Swap - O.S.T (2012)	The Meeting (2012)

In April 2012, Golden Effects Pictures released the Original Soundtrack of Phone Swap for digital download. The Soundtrack of Phone Swap consist three original songs composed by Truth, Adekunle "Nodash" Adejuyigbe and Oyinkansola, performed by Truth and Oyinkansola and a previously released classical song by King Sunny Adé. The Music design and score was done by Truth and the use of traditional Nigerian rhythms and drums were predominantly utilized for the film background scores. The songs incorporate chants, fast-paced uplifting lyrics and traditional beats, but was downgraded to a very light piece with slower beats in some scenes. One of the songs "Fate" is an official first single from the music producer, Truth.

=== Track listing ===
No.	Title	Singer(s)	Length
1.	"Life is beautiful"	Truth	3:33
2.	"Fate"	Truth	3:29
3.	"With You"	Oyinkansola	4:15
4.	"Ma jaiye Oni"	King Sunny Adé	5:08
Total length:			16:30

== Release ==
First official trailer of Phone Swap was released on 1 December 2011 and the second trailer was released on 22 February 2012. The film was screened in various film festivals before it finally premiered at the EXPO hall, Eko Hotels and suites, Lagos on 17 March 2012. It was released Nationwide on 30 March 2012, had a Ghana premiere on 5 April 2012 and afterwards had its international release on 10 November 2012. It was also released in non-traditional markets like Japan, Germany, India, Brazil and Athens. Though the film had been released in the United Kingdom on 10 November 2012, it had a rerun from 16 to 24 March 2013. The film also had a rerun in Nigeria during Ramadan celebrations from 18 through 21 August 2012.

== Reception ==
=== Critical reception ===
The film was met with mostly positive reviews. Nollywood Reinvented commended the cinematography, the subtle comedy and the romance. Though it noted that the film portrayed an unrealistic situation, it gave a 68% rating and concluded: "One great thing about the movie is the emotional connect it creates between the viewers and the ‘couple’, the viewers and the individual characters, the characters and each other and not just Mary and Akin. At the end of the movie you don't just feel like you've seen another movie. It has a lasting impact that only a few movies can create. It's one of those movies that will have you coming back to it time after time." Augusta Okon of 9aija books and movies also praised the cinematography, use of language, production design, editing and soundtrack but talked down on the obvious commercials exhibited in the film. He gave the film a rating of 4 out of 5 stars and concluded: "Phone Swap is incontrovertibly a first class comedy movie in Nollywood, sailing on the seas of dynamism and ingenuity, with its mast of professionalism beating proudly in the air and pointing to one fact…It has raised the movie bar in Nollywood once again!". Kemi Filani praised the cinematography, editing, character development, scripting and props of the film; she concluded: "Phone Swap is full of laugh out loud moments and shows how the most unlikely people can adapt to unexpected situations and circumstances. A film I can definitely recommend." NollywoodForever gave it a Watch Definitely rating and concluded that "...It was funny, it was witty, it was heart warming and more." Dami Elebe of Connect Nigeria commended the directing and scripting of the film and stated "Without a doubt, this is the movie you are proud to show off. It is a beautifully done film and we can’t wait for another collaboration from them (the lead actors) in the future".

Andrew Rice of The New York Times commented: "Kunle Afolayan wants to scare you, he wants to thrill you, he wants to make you laugh, but most of all, he would like you to suspend your disbelief — in his plots, yes, which tend to be over the top, but also about what is possible in Africa." Shari Bollers of Afridiziak stated "All the characters were created to enable the audience to warm up to them and to laugh with and at them. With its switching of dual languages of native and English, it was easy to follow. It was a film that included everyone and warmed us with the humour. Whether Nigerian or not you will find this film funny." Caitlin Pearson of The Africa Channel stated: "What makes the plot of Phone Swap engaging are the performances from its all-star cast, and a visual range in its cinematography that allows us to see more of Nigeria than any claustrophobic Nollywood film could ever hope to do. Francis McKay of Flick Hunter gave a 3 out of 4 stars and concluded: "Kunle Afolayan crafted a highly watchable film with a good story and a cast led by two talented actors. The film is a good representation of Nigeria...".

Kemi Filani commented on the positive portrayal of women in the film: "I love the way women were portrayed. For a change, Nigerian women were strong, smart and beautiful. Although the women in this film are flawed, like every other human being, they were also shown to be inherently good and beautiful." Dami Elebe commended the acting skills of the two lead actors in the film: "Nse Ikpe-Etim executed her role in this movie with precision, perfect pronunciation and class. Wale Ojo is not the typical Nollywood leading man. He is not the hot young boy we always want to just stare at, but the mature fine man we also want to hear. He blended in his role perfectly and showed that he is not a one movie wonder but an actor who will last a lifetime in Nollywood". Caitlin Pearson commented on Wale Ojo's acting skills by stating: "Ojo definitely impresses with his versatility as an actor in taking up this role, and manages to balance the austere qualities of Akin’s character with a sense of compassion". She also commended Hafiz Oyetoro's character by stating "the most funny and entertaining performance is by Hafiz Oyetoro who plays Akin’s assistant Alex. Alex’s character exists in a fine balance between subservient and sneaky that is pure pleasure to watch."

=== Box office ===
Phone Swap was highly successful at the box office. The film recorded ₦3,720,000 in its domestic opening weekend. It topped the charts in its first week of release in Nigeria by grossing ₦20,713,503, beating films like Wrath of the Titans and John carter. This has been said to be due to the number of showing times given to Phone Swap with at least 6 showing times per day for a theatre. It was also reported that the film had several private screenings for corporate organizations and brands. Moreover, the film received nominations at the Africa Movie Academy Awards just before its general theatrical release.

=== Awards ===
The film received four nominations at the 8th Africa Movie Academy Awards including the category Best Nigerian Film. It eventually won the award for Achievement in Production Design. It received the most nominations at the 2012 Best of Nollywood Awards with ten nominations and won the award for Best Production Set; Nse Ikpe Etim also won the award for Best Lead Actress in an English film. Phone Swap also got most nominations and most wins at the 2013 Nollywood Movies Awards with a total of twelve nominations and won the awards for Best Movie, Best Actor in a Supporting Role for Hafeez Oyetoro, Best Actress in a Supporting Role for Ada Ameh, Best Cinematography, Best Original Screenplay and Top Box Office Movie of the Year. It was nominated for eight awards at the 2013 Golden Icons Academy Movie Awards, where Kunle Afolayan won the Best Director category.

Complete list of Awards
Award	Date of ceremony	Category	Recipients and nominees	Result
Africa Film Academy (8th Africa Movie Academy Awards)	22 April 2012	Best Nigerian Film	Kunle Afolayan	Nominated
Africa Film Academy (8th Africa Movie Academy Awards)	22 April 2012	Achievement in Production Design	Pat Nebo	Won
Africa Film Academy (8th Africa Movie Academy Awards)	22 April 2012	Best Actor in a Supporting Role	Hafeez Oyetoro	Nominated
Africa Film Academy (8th Africa Movie Academy Awards)	22 April 2012	Best Actor in a Leading Role	Wale Ojo	Nominated
Abuja International Film Festival (2012 Golden Jury Awards)	September 2012	Best Film	Kunle Afolayan	Won
Abuja International Film Festival (2012 Festival Prize)	September 2012	Outstanding Film Directing	Kunle Afolayan	Won
BON Magazine (2012 Best of Nollywood Awards)	11 November 2012	Best Lead Actress in an English film	Nse Ikpe Etim	Won
BON Magazine (2012 Best of Nollywood Awards)	11 November 2012	Best supporting Actor in an English film	Hafeez Oyetoro	Nominated
BON Magazine (2012 Best of Nollywood Awards)	11 November 2012	Best Lead Actor in an English film	Wale Ojo	Nominated
BON Magazine (2012 Best of Nollywood Awards)	11 November 2012	Director of the Year	Kunle Afolayan	Nominated
BON Magazine (2012 Best of Nollywood Awards)	11 November 2012	Movie of the Year	Kunle Afolayan	Nominated
BON Magazine (2012 Best of Nollywood Awards)	11 November 2012	Screenplay of the Year	Kemi Adesoye	Nominated
BON Magazine (2012 Best of Nollywood Awards)	11 November 2012	Cinematography of the Year	Yinka Edward	Nominated
BON Magazine (2012 Best of Nollywood Awards)	11 November 2012	Movie with Best Sound	Biodun Oni, Eilam Hoffman	Nominated
BON Magazine (2012 Best of Nollywood Awards)	11 November 2012	Best Edited Movie	Yemi Jolaoso	Nominated
BON Magazine (2012 Best of Nollywood Awards)	11 November 2012	Best Production Set	Pat Nebo	Won
MultiChoice (2013 Africa Magic Viewers Choice Awards)	9 March 2013	Best Movie (comedy)	Kunle Afolayan	Nominated
NollywoodWeek Paris (2013 NollywoodWeek Paris Awards)	June 2013	Public Choice Award	Kunle Afolayan	Won
Nollywood Movies Network (2013 Nollywood Movies Awards)	12 October 2013	Best Movie	Kunle Afolayan	Won
Nollywood Movies Network (2013 Nollywood Movies Awards)	12 October 2013	Best Actor in a Leading Role	Wale Ojo	Nominated
Nollywood Movies Network (2013 Nollywood Movies Awards)	12 October 2013	Best Actor in a Supporting Role	Hafeez Oyetoro	Won
Nollywood Movies Network (2013 Nollywood Movies Awards)	12 October 2013	Best Actress in a Supporting Role	Ada Ameh	Won
Nollywood Movies Network (2013 Nollywood Movies Awards)	12 October 2013	Best Director	Kunle Afolayan	Nominated
Nollywood Movies Network (2013 Nollywood Movies Awards)	12 October 2013	Best Editing	Yemi Jolaoso	Nominated
Nollywood Movies Network (2013 Nollywood Movies Awards)	12 October 2013	Best Cinematography	Yinka Edward	Won
Nollywood Movies Network (2013 Nollywood Movies Awards)	12 October 2013	Best Original Screenplay	Kemi Adesoye	Won
Nollywood Movies Network (2013 Nollywood Movies Awards)	12 October 2013	Best Costume Design	Titi Aluko	Nominated
Nollywood Movies Network (2013 Nollywood Movies Awards)	12 October 2013	Best set Design	Pat Nebo	Nominated
Nollywood Movies Network (2013 Nollywood Movies Awards)	12 October 2013	Best Sound Track	Truth	Nominated
Nollywood Movies Network (2013 Nollywood Movies Awards)	12 October 2013	Top Box office Movie	Kunle Afolayan	Won
Golden Icons Magazine (2013 Golden Icons Academy Movie Awards)	19 October 2013	Best Motion Picture	Kunle Afolayan	Nominated
Golden Icons Magazine (2013 Golden Icons Academy Movie Awards)	19 October 2013	Best Director	Kunle Afolayan	Won
Golden Icons Magazine (2013 Golden Icons Academy Movie Awards)	19 October 2013	Best Cinematography	Yinka Edward, Alfred Chia	Nominated
Golden Icons Magazine (2013 Golden Icons Academy Movie Awards)	19 October 2013	Best Comedy	Kunle Afolayan	Nominated
Golden Icons Magazine (2013 Golden Icons Academy Movie Awards)	19 October 2013	Best Actress	Nse Ikpe Etim	Nominated
Golden Icons Magazine (2013 Golden Icons Academy Movie Awards)	19 October 2013	Most Promising Actor (Best New Actor)	Wale Ojo	Nominated
Golden Icons Magazine (2013 Golden Icons Academy Movie Awards)	19 October 2013	Best Original Screenplay	Kemi Adesoye	Nominated
Golden Icons Magazine (2013 Golden Icons Academy Movie Awards)	19 October 2013	Producer of the Year	Kunle Afolayan	Nominated

== Home media ==
In August 2012, it was announced that OHTV had acquired the TV rights for Phone Swap. It has since been released on VOD platforms; including OHTV, Ibaka TV, and Demand Africa. The film was released on DVD on 15 December 2014. Afolayan stated in an Interview that the delay in the DVD release was as a result of plans to have an effective distribution framework for the DVD so as to reduce copyright infringement of the film to a minimum level. The DVD is distributed by G-Media, and it features bonus content such as "behind-the-scene shots" and "The making of...". A special edition DVD package, tagged "Kunle Afolayan’s Collection", containing the other two previous films directed by Kunle Afolayan was also released.

== See also ==
- List of Nigerian films of 2012
