= 2012 Best of Nollywood Awards =

4th Best of Nollywood Awards
- Date: 11 November 2012
- Site: TBS Auditorium, Lagos, Nigeria
- Hosted by: Nonso Diobi and Sylvia Nduka
- Organized by: Best of Nollywood Magazine

Highlights
- Most awards: Ayekooto (5)

The 4th Best of Nollywood Awards was held at Tafawa Balewa Square Auditorium in Lagos, Nigeria. A total of 32 awards were given out to practitioners of the Nigerian film industry. The ceremony was co-hosted by Nollywood actor Nonso Diobi and former Most Beautiful Girl in Nigeria, Sylvia Nduka.

| Best Lead Actress in an English Movie | Best Lead Actor in an Yoruba Movie |
|---|---|
| Nse Ikpe Etim (Phone Swap); Funke Akindele (Married but Living Single); Tonto Dike (My Life My Damage); Ini Edo (I Take my Chance); Shaffy Bello Akinrimisi (The Score) | Femi Adebayo (Aiyekooto); Odunlade Adekola (Irano Meji); Femi Adebayo (Sonto Alapata); Muyiwa Ademola (Enyinju Eledumare) |
| Best Lead Actress in a Yoruba film | Best Lead Actor in a Hausa film |
| Ayo Adesanya (Amope Alasela); Bisi Komolafe (Aiyekooto); Fathai Balogun (Sunmisola Otelemuye); Liz Anjorin (Kofo Tinubu); Bimbo Akintola (Eyinju Eledumare) | Ali Nuhu (Madubin Dubawa); Adam A Zango (Adamsy); Adam A Zango (Ahlul Kital) |
| Best supporting Actress in a Yoruba film | Best supporting Actor in an English film |
| Iyabo Ojo (Ijo Olomo); Kehinde Bankole (Ojukoju); Ireti Osayemi Adeoye (Jejere); Eniola Badmus (Ijewure) | Yemi Blaq (The Search); Hafeez Oyetoro (Phone Swap); Jide Kosoko (Last Flight to Abuja); Alex Ekubo (In the Cupboard) |
| Best Lead Actor in an English film | Best actress in a supporting role in an English film |
| Joseph Benjamin (Married but Living Single); Wale Ojo (Phone Swap); Van Vicker (The Search); Uti Nwachukwu (In the Cupboard) | Tonto Dike (Broken Silence); Nse Ikpe Etim (The Search); Nadia Buari (Holding Hope); Mary Uranta (Mistress) |
| Best actress in a supporting role in an Hausa film | Most Promising Act (male) |
| Rahama Hassan (Madubin Dubawa); Ladidi Fagge (Adamsy); Zainab Abdullahi (Ahlal Kilab) | Alex Ekubo (In the Cupboard); Bryan (I'll Take My Chances); Tony Monjero (Last Flight to Abuja); Ifeanyi Kalu (Udeme) |
| Most Promising Act (female) | Child Actor of the Year |
| Belinda Effah (Kokomma); Arike Akinyanju (Eyinju Eledumare); Iyobosa Olaye (Adesuwa); Moyo Lawal (Holding Hope); Yewande Adekoya (Omo Elemosho) | Wale Akinwunmi (Amope Alasela); Mac Donald Okorowu (Wanderer) |
| Child actress of the year | Director of the Year |
| Priscilla Ojo (Jejeloye); Toyin Adebiyi (Jejere); Sharon (Last Flight to Abuja); Deola Faseye (Married but Living Single); Gbemisola Obadeyi (Amope Alasela) | Bayo Tijani (Aiyekooto); Desmond Elliot (In the Cupboard); Kunle Afolayan (Phone Swap); Obi Emenloye (Last Flight to Abuja); Tunde Laoye (Married but Living Single) |
| Movie of the Year | Comedy Movie of the Year |
| Aiyekooto; In the Cupboard; Phone Swap; Adesuwa; Married but Living Single | Okon Lagos 2; Ijewuru; Amope Alasela |
| Best Movie with a Social Message | Screenplay of the Year |
| Kofo Tinubu; My life My damage; Last Flight to Abuja; Jejere; Victims of Life | The Search; Aiyekooto; In the Cupboard; Phone Swap (Kemi Adesoye); Amope Alasela |
| Cinematography of the Year | Movie with Best Sound |
| Aiyekooto; Adesuwa; Igba n Bajo; Phone Swap; In the Cupboard | Adesuwa; Eyinju Eledumare; Igba n Bajo; Phone Swap; Sonto Alapata |
| Best Edited Movie | Best Production Set |
| I'll Take My Chances; Phone Swap; In the Cupboard; Aiyekooto; Igba N Bajo | Phone Swap; Adesuwa; Sonto Alapata; Eyinju Eledumare; Aiyekooto |
| Best Actor Hausa | Best Supporting Actor hausa |
| Ali Nuhu (Madubin Dubawa); Adam A. Zango (Adamsy); Adam A. Zango (Ahlul Kitab) | Saddik Sani Sadik (Adamsy); Al 'Amin Buhari (Ahlul Kitab) |
| Best Actress Hausa | Best Supporting Actress hausa |
| Fati Ladan (Adamsy); Nafisa Abdullahi (Madubin Dabawa); Napisa Abdullahi (Ahlul Kitab) | Ladidi Fagge (Adamsy); Rahama Hassan (Madubi Dubawa); Zainab Abdullahi (Ahlul Kitab) |
| Best Actor in a supporting role yoruba | Onga Best use of Nigerian food in a film |
| Ibrahim Chitta (Aiyekooto); Kayode Akinbayo (Igban); Rykaydo Agbor (Ojukoju); Gabriel Afolayan (Tangiri) | Udeme; Ijewuru; In the Cupboard; Aiyekooto; Eyinju |
| Best Short film | Best use of Costume |
| Femi Kuti at 50; Nkin; Silver Lining | Jejere; Sotonto Alapata; I'll Take My Chances; Igba N Bajo; Adesuwa |
| Best Kiss in a Nigerian Movie | Best Print Media Journalist |
| Uti Nwachukwu and Tonto Dike (Broken Silence); 9ice and Laide (Jejere); Nse Ikpe Etim and Bola (Search); Tonto Dike and Thomas Aitman (My Life My Damage); Desmond Elliot and Nse Ikpe Etim (Spellbound) | Biodun Kupoluyi; Victor Akande; Sam Olatunji; Hazeez |
Special Recognition
Emem Isong; Tunde Kelani; Richard Mofe Damijo
