= 2013 Nollywood Movies Awards =

2nd Nollywood Movies Awards
- Date: 12 October 2013
- Site: Intercontinental Hotel, Victoria Island, Lagos, Nigeria
- Hosted by: Segun Arinze and Dakore Akande
- Organized by: Nollywood Movies Network

Winners are written first and are emboldened.

Best Movie: Phone Swap; Hoodrush; Journey to Self; The Meeting; Udeme Mmi; Mrs Somebody	Best Actor in a Leading Role: OC Ukeje (Hoodrush); Bayo Alawiye (The Gods are still not to Blame); Gabriel Afolayan (First Cause); Iyke Adiele (Broken (2013 film)); Moses Armstrong (Udeme mmi); Wale Ojo (Phone Swap)
Best Actress in a Leading Role: Rita Dominic (The Meeting); Nse Ikpe Etim (Mr & Mrs); Mercy Johnson (Dumebi); Funke Akindele (Maami); Bimbo Akintola (Hoodrush); Uche Jombo (Mrs Somebody)	Best Actor in a Supporting Role: Afeez Oyetoro (Phone Swap); Imeh Bishop Udoh (Udeme mmi); Akin Lewis (Heros & Zeros); Bimbo Manuel (Broken (2013 film)); Gabriel Afolayan (Hoodrush); Bob Manuel Udokwu (Adesuwa)
Best Actress in a supporting Role: Ada Ameh (Phone Swap); Ngozi Ezeonu (Adesuwa); Barbara Soky (Bridge of Hope); Chelsea Eze (Hoodrush); Mary Chukwu (Broken (2013 film))	Best indigenous Actor: Imeh Bishop Udoh (Udeme mmi); Ekere Nkanga (Kokomma); Wole Ojo (Maami); Segun ‘Lanko’ Ogunremi (Odasan)
Best Actress Indigenous: Funke Akindele (Maami); Tope Brass (Odasan); Belinda Effah (Kokomma); Obonganwan Bennet-James (Udeme Mmi)	Best Indigenous Movie: Maami; Udeme mmi; Odasan; Kokomma
Best Director: Mildred Okwo (The Meeting); Lancelot Imasuen (Udeme mmi); Dimeji Ajibola (Hoodrush); Kunle Afolayan (Phone Swap); Tope Oshin Ogun (Journey to Self)	Best Editing: Adekunle "Nodash" Adejuyigbe (Journey to Self); Paul Apel (Mr & Mrs); Yemi Jolaosho (Phone Swap); Victor Ehi-Amedu (Adesuwa); Dimeji Ajibola (Hoodrush); Okey Benson (The Meeting)
Best Sound Design: Obi Emelonye (Last Flight to Abuja); Semiu Adewuyi (Kokomma); Carl Raccah (Journey to Self); Olukunle Adegbite (The Gods are Still not to Blame); Alex Njuguna (The Meeting); Dimeji Ajibola (Hoodrush)	Best Cinematography: Yinka Edward (Phone Swap); Alfred Chia (Heros & Zeros); James Costello (Last Flight to Abuja); Shalom Uyi Enabulele (Broken); Jim Bishop (The Meeting); Byron Ene (The Gods are still not to Blame)
Best Original Screenplay: Kemi Adesoye (Phone Swap); Tunde Babalola (Maami); Mildred Okwo & Tunde Babalola (The Meeting); Rita C Onwurah (Udeme mmi); Dimeji Ajibola (Hoodrush); Tchidi Chikere (Dumebi)	Best Costume Design: Jaiye Owolabi (The Gods are Still not to Blame); Titi Aluko (Phone Swap); Ekene Okoye Mpon (Kiss and the Brides); Yolanda Okereke & Aminat Olateju (Journey to Self); Wanger Ayu & Rosaline Ijejem (Mr & Mrs); Iyen Agbonifo (Adesuwa)
Best Make-up: Jennifer Alegieuno (The Meeting); Temisan Etsede – Adesuwa; Touch of Glamour- Tobi Jeje- Phillip & Korede Olowoyo (Journey to Self); Tracy Iyoha (The Gods are still not to Blame); Olivia Obasi (Broken)	Best Set Design: Sango B’ Song (Last Flight to Abuja); Pat Nebo (Phone Swap); Adeoye Bakare (Heros & Zeros); Hilary Patrick (The Meeting)
Best Sound Track: Patrick Mathias (Hoodrush); Truth (The Meeting); Luke Corradine (Last flight to Abuja); Slam (Udeme Mmi); Truth (Phone Swap); Oludare Olateju (The Gods are still not to Blame)	Best Diaspora Movie: Man on Ground; Alaalo; Turning Point (2012 film); The Past came Calling; Secret Past
Best Short Movie: Unspoken; 15 Minutes; Epitaph; Ogondah; Blink; Till Death do us Apart	Best Rising Star (male): Uti Nwachukwu (In the Cupboard); OC Ukeje – Hoodrush; Ifeanyi Kalu (Kokomma); Bobby Obodo – (Mrs Somebody)
Best Rising Star (female): Belinda Effah (Kokomma); Linda Ejiofor (The Meeting); Ijeoma Agu (Hoodrush); Rachel Isaac (Daisy); Tehila Adiele (Broken (2013 film)); Tess Abubakar (In the cupboard)	Best child Actor: Ayomide Abati (Maami); Adeola Faseyi (Married but Living Single); Regina Ojeogwu (Wave of Glory); Obiora Samuel Olife (Broken Silence)
Popular online Choice (male): Imeh Bishop Udoh	Popular online Choice (female): Omotola Jalade Ekeinde
Top Box office Movie: Phone Swap	Industry Patron Award: Godswill Obot Akpabio
Goodluck Jonathan Lifetime Achievement Award: Justus Esiri
