= LVB =

LVB may refer to:

- IRS Airlines, ICAO airline code LVB
- Leipziger Verkehrsbetriebe, the Leipzig, Germany, tram and bus operator
- Lakshmi Vilas Bank, an Indian private sector bank
- LVB, a German Army variant of the Fennek armed reconnaissance vehicle

== See also ==
- Ludwig van Beethoven, German composer
