= Adesoye =

Nigerian given name

- Gender: Male
- Language: Yoruba

Origin
- Origin: Nigeria
- Meaning: One who arrives into wealth. 2. We arrive into wealth".
- Region of origin: South West, Nigeria

Adesoye audio is a Nigerian male given name and surname of Yoruba origin. It means "One who arrives into wealth" or "We arrive into wealth".

Notable individuals with the name include:

- Kemi Adesoye, Nigerian screenwriter
- Adesoye Oyevole (born 18 September 1982), Russian football coach
