= Tunde Olaoye =

Nigerian film director

- Born: Nigeria
- Occupations: Film director, film producer, screenwriter
- Known for: Everybody Loves Jenifa; Married but Living Single; Singleness is Bliss

Tunde Olaoye is a Nigerian TV/Film Writer/Director known for directing alongside Funke Akindele, Everybody Loves Jenifa. He also directed Married but Living Single.

== Career ==
Olaoye began working in the Nigerian film industry as a director and producer. His early work includes the 2012 romantic drama Married But Living Single, starring Funke Akindele and Joseph Benjamin.

In 2024, Olaoye co-directed Everybody Loves Jenifa, a feature film connected to the Jenifa franchise.

In 2025, Olaoye directed Singleness is Bliss, produced by Fisayo Ajisola-Borokinni. The film, shot in Nigeria and the United Kingdom, features Jide Kosoko, Sola Sobowale, Hafiz Oyetoro, Bimbo Akintola, Sanyeri, Mr Macaroni, Rotimi Salami, and Chy Nwakanwa, exploring themes of societal pressure and misogyny.

Tunde has also directed Over Her Dead Body and Tears of Vengeance

He has directed biographical films such as Last Man Standing, Yahaya the White Lion, and a biopic on Oba Sikiru Kayode Adetona (Awujale of Ijebu). Olaoye has stated that historical films require extensive research, which is a central part of his interest in biopics.

In 2025, he emerged as the Public Relations Office of The Golden Movie Ambassadors Association of Nigeria (TGMAAN), alongside actors and filmmakers such as Saidi Balogun and Afeez Oyetoro.

== Filmography ==
- Married But Living Single (2012) – Director
- Everybody Loves Jenifa (2024) – Director (with Funke Akindele)
- Over Her Dead Body – Director
- Tears of Vengeance – Director
- Singleness is Bliss (2025) – Director
- Last Man Standing – Director
- Yahaya the White Lion – Director
- Awujale – Director (biopic of Oba Sikiru Kayode Adetona)
