= Don't Get Mad, Get Even =

Don't Get Mad, Get Even can refer to:

- Don't Get Mad Get Even (film), a 2019 Nigerian film
- Don't Get Mad, Get Even (album), a 1984 album by Samson, or the titular song
- "Don't Get Mad, Get Even", a song by Aerosmith from the 1989 album Pump
