= Wale Ojo =

British Nigerian actor

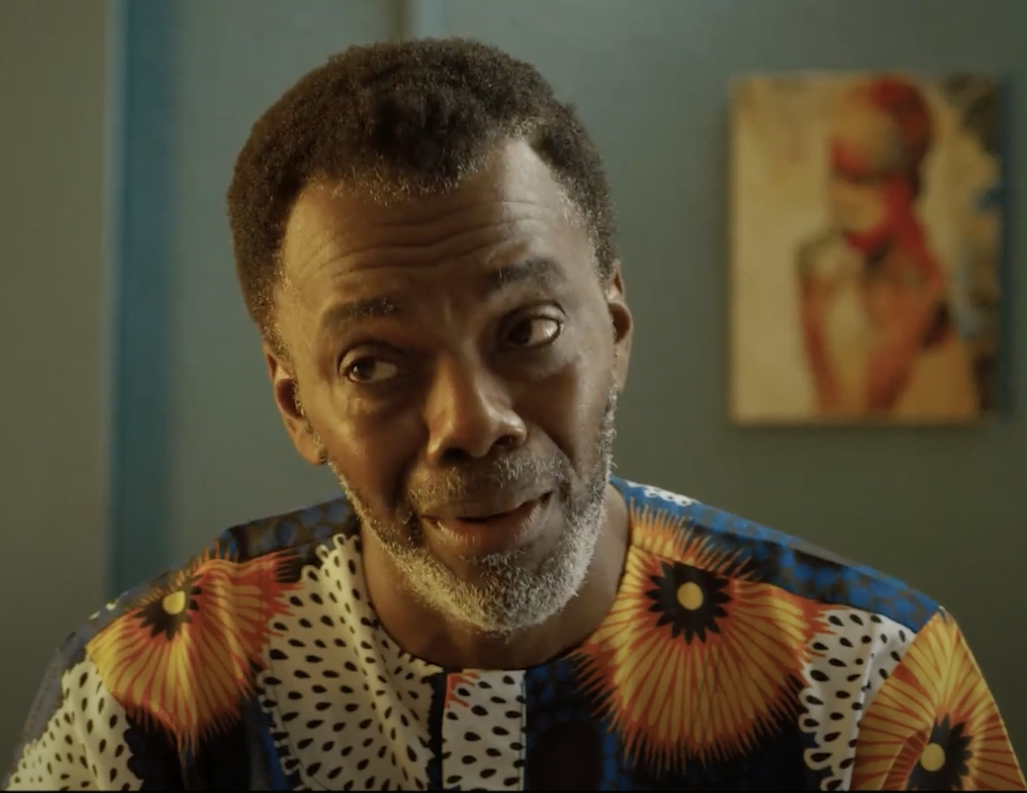
- Born: September 9, 1964 (age 62)
- Citizenship: United Kingdom, Nigeria
- Education: University of Hull, (Drama, 1986)
- Occupations: actor; producer; director
- Years active: 1976–present
- Known for: Phone Swap (film)

Wale Ojo is a British Nigerian actor, director, and producer. He started as a child actor in television before transitioning to acting roles in the UK and Nigeria. He came into prominence in 1995 for his role in The Hard Case, Guy Ritchie's debut short film, and has since continued acting in film, television, and theater. He won the award for Best Actor at the 2012 Nigeria Entertainment Awards for his leading role in Phone Swap.

== Early life and education ==
Ojo started acting professionally as a child. At the age of 8, he worked with Akin Lewis, who played a barber on the NTA Ibadan 1980s television series Why Worry. At age 12, he moved with his family to England, where he also attended university.

Ojo credits his career to the influence of his mother, who was an actress and supportive of his career, as well as Chief Wale Ogunyemi, Tunji Oyelana, playwright Wole Soyinka, and Zulu Sofola.

== New Nigeria Cinema ==
Ojo is credited with spearheading New Nigeria Cinema, a modern wave of film production within the country. New Nigeria Cinema hosted a film viewing and lectures at the British Film Institute in London in 2010.

== Filmography ==
=== Films ===
Year	Title	Role	Notes
1995	The Hard Case	The gambler	Short film
1999	Rage	Pin	Ojo's first feature film debut. He plays a schizophrenic gangster.
2011	Johnny English Reborn	President Chambal	
2011	The Guard	Doctor Oleyuwo	Irish buddy film starring Brendan Gleeson, Don Cheadle.
2012	Phone Swap	Akin	Also featured Nse Ikpe Etim, Joke Silva, Chika Okpala, Lydia Forson and Hafeez Oyetoro. This was Ojo's first feature film in Nigeria.
2012	Big Man		
2013	Half of a Yellow Sun	Chief Okonji	Historical film featuring Chiwetel Ejiofor, Thandie Newton, Onyeka Onwenu, Anika Noni Rose, Joseph Mawle, Genevieve Nnaji, OC Ukeje and John Boyega.
2014	A Letter from Adam	Adam	Romance starring Lydia Forson (who also wrote the screenplay), Naa Ashokor Mensah Doku, Akorfa Edjeani, Albert Jackson, Fred Kanebi, Jeff Kumordzie and Louie Lartey.
2014	Render to Caesar	Pade	Crime thriller also featuring Gbenga Akinnagbe, Omoni Oboli and Bimbo Manuel
2014	When Love Happens	Oladele Laguda	Romantic comedy featuring Weruche Opia as Moduroti (Mo) Bankole-Smith
2015	8 Bars and a Clef	Felix Mensah	Film about a musically gifted recording artist dealing with dyslexia.
2015	Fifty	Kunle	Stars Iretiola Doyle, Nse Ikpe-Etim, Dakore Egbuson
2016	Ayamma: Music in the Forest	Prince Daraima	Directed by Chris Eneaji Eneng. Also starring Moses Armstrong, Theresa Edem, Smart Edikan
2016	Betrayal	Funbi	Written and directed by Darasen Richards. Also starring David Jones David and Theresa Edem.
2016	The CEO	Kola Alabi	
2016	Ojukokoro	Mad Dog Max	This crime film is also known as Ojukokoro: Greed and includes an ensemble cast.
2016	White Colour Black	Monsiour Dabo	Also starring Dudley O’Shaughnessy as the main character.
2017	Alter Ego	Timothy	Also starring Ayenuro Ademola, Rahila Ahmed, Abiola Atande
2017	Sand Castle	Ayade	Also starring Mary Uranta and Sylvia Edem.
2018	Disguise	Theophilus Vaughn	Also starring Toyin Abraham, Faith Adibe, Daniel K. Daniel, Afanye Daniel
2018	Lara and the Beat	Uncle Tunde	Also starring Chioma Chukwuka, Saidi Balogun, Shaffy Bello, Chinedu Ikedieze
2018	New Money	Chuka	Also stars Jemima Osunde, Kate Henshaw, Blossom Chukwujekwu, Dakore Akande, Osas Ighodaro and Falz d Bahd Guy.
2018	Voiceless Scream	Dr. Joel Azubike	Directed by Dotun Taylor and also stars Jide Kosoko and Adeniyi Johnson.
2019	Another Father's Day	Femi Daniel	Sequel to Happy Father's Day film. Directed by Bukola Ogunsola. Also stars Mercy Aigbe.
2019	Coming from Insanity	Mr. Martins	Crime drama with Gabriel Afolyan, Sani Danja, Dakore Akande, Bolanle Ninalowo, and Damilola Adegbite
2019	Don't Get Mad Get Even	Dr. Badejo	Ojo's feature film directorial debut. Features Toyin Abraham, Saheed Balogun and Nancy Isime.
2019	Jumbled	Mr Sagoe	Also stars Femi Adebayo, Eucharia Anunobi Ekwu, Lilian Esoro.
2019	Kasanova	Femi	Also starring Iretiola Doyle, Toyin Abraham, Ruby Akubueze and Yomi Alvin.
2019	Ordinary Fellows	Professor Jega	A film by Lorenzo Menakaya
2019	Walking with Shadows	Dad	Drama also starring Ozzy Agu, Funlola Aofiyebi, Ayoola Ayolola, Zainab Balogun, Riyo David and Ade Laoye.
2020	This Lady Called Life	Daddy	Stars Bisola Aiyeola, Samuel Asa'ah, and Lota Chukwu.
2021	Silent Murder		Also stars Tina Mba, Wole Ojo, Saidi Balogun, Eniola Badmus, Charles Okocha, Bayray McNwizu.
2022	Bloodhound	Azusa	Also starring Ademola Adedoyin, Abayomi Alvin, Samuel Asa'ah.
2022	Songs of Ubong	Ubong	Also stars Rhoda Morakinyo. Directed by Owen Olowu. Inspired by the Songs of Solomon.
2022	A Place Called Forward	Husband	Also stars Fred Amata and Judith Audu. Written by Aboyowa Aby Mene. Directed by Umanu Ojochenemi Elijah.
2022	A Song From the Dark	Magnus Williams	Also stars Garcia Alicia Brown, Kane Surry, Vanessa Vanderpuye, Nse Ikpe-Etim, Dean Kilbey, Tom Patient, Lola Ogunyemi, Dimeji Ewuoso, Ryan Spong, Dylan McCormack, Octavia Gilmore, Yinka Awoni, Marshall Griffin, Alexander Scrivens, Amy Lally. Written and directed by Ogodinife Okpue.
2023	Love, Lust & Other Things	Chijindu Amadi	Also stars Osas Ighodaro and Ramsey Nouah. Directed by Kayode Kasum.
2023	Breath of Life	Timi Johnson	Also stars Genoveva Umeh, Chimezie Imo, Bimbo Manuel, Tina Mba, Demola Adedoyin, Sam Dede, Sambasa Nzeribe, and Melly Atari. First Amazon Prime commissioned Nigerian film.
2024	The Man Died	Wole Soyinka	Based on Soyinka's memoir of the same name. Also stars Sam Dede, Norbert Young, Segilola Ogidan, Abraham Amkpa, Christiana Oshunniyi, Temmy Fosudo, and Ropo Ewenla. Directed by Awam Amkpa.
2025	Carmen & Bolude	Akin	Also stars Michela Carattini and Bolude Watson. Directed by Michela Carattini and Maria Isabel Delaossa.

=== Television ===
Year	Title	Role	Notes
1989	Behaving Badly	Jim	Television mini-serial
1998 – 2000	Heartburn Hotel	Chidi Ekechi	Television serial
2009	The No. 1 Ladies' Detective Agency (TV series)	Kebone Legodimo	
2012 - 2016	Meet the Adebanjos	Mr. Bayo Adebanjo	British-Nigerian sitcom from 2012 to 2016.
2014	Tinsel (TV series)	Nosa	Long-running Nigerian soap opera
2018	Black Earth Rising	Dr. Emmanuel Musoni	BBC Two production
2021	Foundation	Professor Arren Sorn	Apple TV's sci fi series
2022	Blood Sisters	Inspector Joe	Netflix original series

=== Theatre ===
Year	Play	Theatre	Role	Notes
2009	The Sunset Limited	Capital Centre, Warwickshire, England	Black	Michael Gould performed as White
2005	Who Killed Mr Drum?	Riverside Studios, Hammersmith, London	Henry Nxumalo	The plays title references the murder of an investigative reporter from South Africa's well-known magazine, Drum.

=== As Director ===
Year	Title	Distributor	Notes
2017	Ghost of Tarkwa Bay	unknown	Nigeria's first movie about the art of surfing. Also features Ibrahim Odrago, May Owen, Armando Abraham, and Godspower. This short film marks Wale Ojo's directorial debut.
2022	This, Your Lagos	unknown	This documentary, starring William H. Ashbee, is 1 hour and 36 mins in length.

== Awards and nominations ==
Year	Event	Prize	Work	Result
2013	Nollywood Movies Awards	Best Actor in a Leading Role	Phone Swap	Nominated
2012	Nigeria Entertainment Awards	Best Actor in a Film	Phone Swap	Won
2015	Africa Magic Viewers' Choice Awards	Best Actor in a Comedy	Meet the Adebanjos	Nominated
2018	Africa Magic Viewers' Choice Awards	Best Supporting Actor	Betrayal	Nominated
2018	Africa Magic Viewers' Choice Awards	Best Actor in a Drama	Alter Ego	Nominated
2022	Africa Movie Academy Award	Best Supporting Actor	A Song From the Dark	Nominated
2024	Africa Magic Viewers' Choice Awards	Best Lead Actor	Breath of Life (2023 film)	Won

== See also ==
- List of Nigerian film producers
