= Jumbled =

2019 Nigerian family romantic drama film

- Film poster
- Directed by: Saheed Apanpa
- Produced by: Bami Gregs
- Starring: Wale Ojo; Femi Adebayo; Lilian Esoro
- Release date: 12 April 2019
- Running time: 115 minutes
- Country: Nigeria
- Language: English

Jumbled is a 2019 Nigerian family romantic drama film directed by Saheed Apanpa. The film was primarily shot in Lagos. The film was initially titled as Entangled but it was changed in early 2019 to avoid the use of a similar title which was used by another filmmaker. It stars Wale Ojo, Femi Adebayo and Lilian Esoro in the lead roles. The film was released on 12 April 2019 and received mixed reviews from critics.

== Synopsis ==
A young girl in her early 30s keeps having her heart broken until she finds an ideal man for a relationship, only to find out that he may just be the worst of all other men.

== Cast ==
- Lilian Esoro as Adaeze
- Airebamen Irene as Uju
- Beverly Naya as Jasmine
- Femi Adebayo as Yinka
- Eucharia Anunobi as Mrs. Ezenwa
- Wale Ojo as Mr. Sagoe
- Kemigisha Harriet as Yemisi
- Kenneth Okolie as Damilola
- Emem Ufot as Ayo

== Release ==
The cast and crew members were introduced to the media on 11 April 2019, a day prior to the film theatrical release at an exclusive screening of the film which was held at the Silverbird Cinema.
