= Kudzai Sevenzo =

Zimbabwean actress and singer

- Born: May 3, 1979 (age 46); Harare, Zimbabwe
- Occupations: Jazz musician; actress; TV presenter

Kudzai Sevenzo is a Zimbabwean actress and singer, born in Harare, Zimbabwe. She was recognized as a talented performer by actor Nyambi Nyambi Jr.

== Career background ==
Sevenzo's career was launched by the African media company MNET through the reality television talent show Project Fame. She competed against 16 contestants from across the continent and was selected as the sole representative of Zimbabwe. She was also one of three contestants who showcased original songwriting talent. Sevenzo advanced to the penultimate round of the competition. Following her appearance on the show, she released her debut album On a Day Like This, produced by Andrew Baird, who also produced her second album, Child of Africa.

=== Television ===
Sevenzo anchored a magazine show on MNET called Studio 53, where she traveled across Africa exploring its cuisine, arts, culture and diversity. The show provided her with the opportunity to interview Africa's first female president, Ellen Johnson Sirleaf.
