= Don't Get Mad Get Even =

- Directed by: Wale Ojo
- Produced by: Raphael Dedenuola
- Starring: Femi Jacobs, Yemi Solade, Deyemi Okanlanwon, Kenneth Okolie, Toyin Abraham, Patience Ozokwor and Jide Kosoko
- Production company: RGD Media
- Distributed by: Silverbird Film Distribution
- Release date: 2019
- Country: Nigeria
- Language: English

Don't Get Mad Get Even is a 2019 Nigerian film produced by Raphael Dedenuola and directed by Wale Ojo. It was released by RGD Media and distributed by Silverbird Film Distribution. The film explores the difference between education and wealth. It stars Femi Jacobs, Yemi Solade, Deyemi Okanlawon, Kenneth Okolie, Toyin Abraham, Patience Ozokwor and Jide Kosoko.

== Synopsis ==
The story follows two brothers: one educated, the other uneducated but creative. The plot twists when the older brother, a lecturer, goes broke and has to depend on his younger brother, who has become a successful musician.

== Cast ==
- Femi Jacobs as Juwon
- Deyemi Okanlawon as Kunle
- Toyin Abraham as Ngozi
- Patience Ozokwor as Mama Caro
- Yemi Solade as Jaiye
- Nancy Isime as Ada
- Jide Kosoko as Landlord
- Kenneth Okolie as Julius
- Saheed Balogun as Ksali
- Wale Ojo as Dr. Badejo

== Premiere ==
The film premiered in Nigeria and Ghana on 4 October 2019.
