= Mirror in the Sun =

Nigerian soap opera

Mirror in the Sun is a Nigerian soap opera written and produced by Lola Fani-Kayode in collaboration with the production company, Cine kraft Ltd. The show aired on NTA Network every Sunday from January 1984 to January 1986. During its run, a total of 52 episodes were aired. The show was popular and successful in Nigeria where it attracted a large TV audience during its run.

== Production ==
The plot of Mirror in the Sun was written by Lola Fani-Kayode who was also the show's producer and who sometimes directed episodes. Fani-Kayode and the firm Cine Kraft Ltd independently developed the concept of the soap in 1983 with the intention of seeking sponsorship from manufacturers of child care products. However, economic challenges faced by manufacturers made the show a tough sell to sponsors. The firm then approached the management of NTA which liked the script and approved its debut for January 1984. Fani-Kayode was involved with the writing and production of the first 39 episodes that aired before production was taken over by NTA which oversaw the production of the remaining 13 episodes. As the producer of the show, she became one of the country's high profile independent TV producers

The plot of the show mirrors the lives of a group of middle and upper class Nigerian families living in a block of flats in the city of Lagos. The show was a pioneer Nigerian television program that was located in an urban setting with upper and middle class characters while also satirizing the foibles of the rich in the city. This concept influenced other soap operas such as Checkmate.

== Cast ==
- Lari Williams as Ladipo, head of the Ladipo family
- Florence Edo as Ladipo's mother
- Ameze Giwa-Osagie as Ebiere
- Barbara Soky is Yinka Fowole, a beautiful lady dating two people. She is in love with Tosan her age mate but was also dating a sugar daddy.
- Omawumi Efueye as Tosan
- Clarion Chukwura as Tinu, a university graduate in a relationship with two men.
- Enebeli Elebuwa as Chike
- Dupe Adetuwo is Ranti Tokunbo, a busy businesswoman but also an irresponsible mother.
- Tuoyo Olley as Jimi Ajayi
- Vera Adesanya as Boma
- Joke Silva as Miriam
- Dolly unachukwu
