= Jordan Coulson =

English actor

- Born: England
- Occupation: Actor
- Years active: 2010–present

Jordan Coulson is a British actor. He played Howard ‘Hambone’ Hamilton in Masters of The Air on Apple TV+. Coulson is also known for playing Jed in Romantic Getaway and Kevin in Stephen Poliakoff's television series Summer of Rockets. He also played a mobster in The Batman.

== Filmography ==
=== Television ===
Year	Title	Role	Notes	Ref
2012–2014	Meet the Adebanjos	Kevin	Regular (Series 1-2)	
2014	Casualty	Woody Doyle	Guest appearance, Falling: Part One	
2015	Hetty Feather	Jack Black	Guest appearance, The Tower	
2015	Cradle to Grave	Steve	Guest appearance, Episode 2 and 3	
2016	Lovesick	Robbie	Guest appearance, Series 2 episode 2	
2017	EastEnders	Tommy	Guest appearance, Episode 5462	
2024	Masters of the Air	Lt. Howard Hamilton	Apple TV+ Miniseries	

=== Film ===
Year	Title	Role	Notes	Ref
2010	The Wolfman	Wolf Boy	Directed by Joe Johnston	
2016	Ibiza Undead	Alex	Directed by Andy Edwards	
2016	The Tombs	Drunk Lad	Directed by Dan Brownlie	
2022	The Batman	Mobster	Directed by Matt Reeves	

== Web series ==
Year	Title	Role	Notes	Ref
2016	Dirty Laundry - Hello Mozart	Cian,	Directed by Jason Bradbury	
