= Fifty (film) =

2015 film by Biyi Bandele

- Theatrical release poster
- Directed by: Biyi Bandele
- Written by: Bola Agbaje; Kemi Adesoye
- Produced by: Tope Oshin
- Starring: Nse Ikpe-Etim; Ireti Doyle; Omoni Oboli; Dakore Akande
- Cinematography: Malcolm John McLean; Adekunle "Nodash" Adejuyigbe
- Edited by: Matthew Bate
- Music by: Ben Onono
- Production company: EbonyLife Films
- Distributed by: FilmOne Distribution
- Release dates: 17 October 2015 (BFI); 13 December 2015 (Lagos); 18 December 2015 (Nigeria)
- Running time: 101 minutes
- Country: Nigeria
- Language: English
- Box office: ₦87 million

Fifty is a 2015 Nigerian romantic drama film, directed by Biyi Bandele and released on 18 December 2015.

== Plot ==
Fifty captures a few pivotal days of four women at the pinnacle of their careers. Tola, Elizabeth, Maria, and Kate are four friends forced at midlife to take inventory of their personal lives while juggling career and family against the backdrops of the neighbourhoods of Lagos.

Tola is a reality TV star whose marriage to lawyer Kunle never stood a chance thanks to an invidious family secret. Elizabeth is a celebrated obstetrician whose penchant for younger men has estranged her from her daughter. Maria, a forty-nine-year-old, has an affair with a married man that results in an unexpected pregnancy, and Kate's battle with a life-threatening illness has plugged her into religious obsession.

== Cast ==
=== Main cast ===
- Ireti Doyle as Elizabeth, who is an obstetrician whose desire for younger men has caused a strain on her relationship with her daughter.
- Dakore Akande as Tola, who is a reality TV star whose marriage to lawyer Kunle never stood a chance due to an invidious family secret.
- Omoni Oboli as Maria who is a forty-nine -year-ld lady who had an affair with a married man that results in an unexpected pregnancy
- Nse Ikpe-Etim as Kate who is battling with a life-threatening illness that plunged her into religious obsession
- Wale Ojo as Kunle
- Kachi Nnochiri as Chike
- Emmanuel Ikubese as Sammy
- Kemi ‘Lala’ Akindoju as Chi Chi
- Timini Egbuson as Jamal
- Uzor Osimkpa as Sade

=== Guest stars ===
- King Sunny Adé as himself
- Femi Kuti as himself
- Nneka as herself
- Tiwa Savage as herself
- Waje as herself

== Production ==
The film is executively produced by Ebony Life TV CEO Mo Abudu. Directed by Biyi Bandele.

== Release ==
Fifty had its premiere in London in October 2015, which sold out in four days, and a private screening in Lagos was also held that month. The Grand Premiere was on Sunday, 13 December 2015, at the Eko Hotel and Suites. The film was released to cinemas on 18 December 2015.

== Critical reception ==
The movie was met with mixed to positive reviews. Nollywood Reinvented rated the movie 52% and highlighted its lack of content and depth.
