= Lari Williams =

Nigerian actor and poet (1940–2022)

- Born: Lari Williams; September 8, 1940
- Died: February 27, 2022 (aged 81); Cross River State
- Occupation: Actor
- Notable work: Mirror in the Sun

Lari Williams (8 September 1940 – 27 February 2022) was a Nigerian actor, poet, and playwright renowned for his pivotal roles in Nigerian television soap operas such as The Village Headmaster, Ripples, and Mirror in the Sun. and his substantial influence on the country's performing arts scene. Williams was born in Nigeria in 1940. He died at his home in Ikom, Cross River State, on 27 February 2022, at the age of 81.

== Early life and education ==
Williams was born in 1940 in Nigeria. He attended CMS Grammar School in Lagos. His passion for drama led him to study journalism at the London School of Journalism. He furthered his education in English at Morley College and pursued drama at the Mountview Theatre School in London. To enhance his acting skills, he attended the University of Iowa in the United States and the Stratford E15 Acting School in England, where he became a professional actor. During his time in England, Williams established a group named Calabash Artists. He returned to Nigeria in 1977 for FESTAC ’77 and decided to remain with his family to continue his career.

== Career ==
Williams' career spanned over five decades, during which he made significant contributions to Nigerian theatre, television, and literature.

=== Theatre and film ===
Williams was a celebrated actor in both live theatre and on-screen performances. He gained prominence for his roles in popular Nigerian soap operas such as The Village Headmaster, Ripples, and Mirror in the Sun. Notably, he was the first actor to perform on top of Zuma Rock in Abuja, where he recited his late friend Mamman Vatsa’s poem, "The Bird That Sings in the Rain".

Williams was an influential figure in the Nigerian theatre scene, especially in the 1980s. He founded the Lari Williams Playhouse, one of the notable amateur theatre groups in Lagos. During this period, there was a vibrant and diverse theatre landscape in Nigeria, with professional theatre troupes like PEC Repertory Theatre at JK Randle Hall, Onikan-Lagos, and Chief Fred Agbeyegbe’s Ajo Productions, as well as university-based troupes such as the University of Ibadan Performing Company (UPC) and University of Calabar Performing Company (UCPC). Alongside these, amateur theatre groups like Lari Williams Playhouse, Komikals Playhouse (Ralph Akolade Aboyeji), Ayota Playhouse (Segun Taiwo), and Agogo Playhouse at the Museum Kitchen, Onikan-Lagos, contributed significantly to the cultural vibrancy of Lagos.

Lari Williams Playhouse was a key part of the thriving theatre culture, with artists regularly participating in performances and events organized by various playhouses, such as Ajo Productions’ "AJO FEST". The annual festival attracted artists because of its enticing artist fees and the opportunity for collaborative performances. During this period, productions such as The King Must Dance Naked, Woe Unto Death, The Last Omen, and Budiso by Pa Fred Agbeyegbe were staged at the Cinema Hall II of the National Arts Theatre, Iganmu-Lagos, further cementing the importance of the theatre community in shaping the entertainment sector of the country.

This environment of professional, university, and amateur theatre groups helped lay the foundation for the growth of modern Nigerian theatre and gave artists like Lari Williams an avenue to showcase their craft and engage with a broader audience.

=== Theatre and radio plays ===
Williams had a notable career in both radio and theatre, beginning with radio plays he wrote for the BBC, including:

- Kolanut Junction (London, 1971)
- Brother’s Keeper (BBC London, 1974)
- Year of Goats (BBC London, 1975)
- Midnight Voices (BBC London, 1976)
- Awero (FRCN Nigeria)

He was also instrumental in founding several important theatre companies and projects, such as:

- Calabash Artistes (London), which performed at various venues like the Africa Centre and Students’ International Centre in London between 1971 and 1974.
- Lari Williams Playhouse, which became a key player in Lagos’ theatre scene.
- Academy of Dramatic Arts and Music (ADAM), contributing to the development of young talent.

Williams also founded and directed the Open Theatre Project with Col. Tunde Akogun, which aimed at bringing innovative performances to Nigerian audiences.

=== Film and television appearances ===
Williams appeared in a wide array of popular Nigerian TV shows, including:

- Village Headmaster
- For Better, For Worse
- Adio’s Family
- Mirror in the Sun
- Ripples
- Spacs

His work extended to various notable films, such as:

- The Lion Man (Elstree, London)
- Cry Freedom (Ghana)
- The Eye of Life (Oyo, Nigeria)
- Omen of Love (Lagos)

Additionally, Williams featured in several home videos, including Witch Doctor of The Living Dead, Black Powder, Blood Money 2, Forever, Rat Race, Embryo, The Monster, Decreed by God, The Enemies, My Sojourn, etc.

Also, stage plays, with performances across Nigeria, including Sizwe Banzi is Dead and Isibru Epkeri, staged at the National Theatre Iganmu, Lagos, from 1977 to 1986.

=== Published works and poetry ===
Williams is also an accomplished writer, with several published works:

- Drumcall An Anthology, 1976
- Black Current, 1977
- Storm Baby, 1977
- Heartlines on Drumcall, 2008 He has contributed to numerous anthologies, including Nature Poems by Three Actors (2000) and An Offering of Olive (2004).

=== Writing ===
Beyond acting, Williams was a prolific writer. He maintained a long-running column titled "Stage and Screen" in Vanguard Newspaper for nearly three decades. His literary works include plays and poetry collections such as Kolanut Junction, Black Current, Heartlines, Year of Goats, and Storm Baby.

=== Academia ===
Williams was dedicated to nurturing the next generation of performers. He taught Theatre Arts at several Nigerian universities, including the University of Lagos (UNILAG), Lagos State University (LASU), and the University of Calabar (UNICAL). Additionally, he taught arts at the National Theatre in Lagos.

Political nvolvement

In 1983, Williams expanded his influence beyond the arts by entering the political arena. He joined the Movement of the People (MOP), a political party founded by his friend and renowned Afrobeat musician, Fela Anikulapo-Kuti. Williams was selected as Fela's vice-presidential running mate for the 1983 Nigerian general elections. Their campaign was rooted in advocating for societal change and combating corruption within Nigeria. However, their political aspirations were curtailed when the MOP was barred from participating in the elections by the Federal Electoral Commission (FEDECO), preventing their names from appearing on the ballot.

Despite this setback, Williams remained committed to activism through his artistic endeavors, using his platform to highlight social issues and contribute to the development of Nigeria's creative industry.

=== Actors Guild of Nigeria ===
Williams was the inaugural President of the Actors Guild of Nigeria (AGN), playing a foundational role in shaping the country's film industry and advocating for the welfare of Nigerian actors.

Views on Nollywood and the Nigerian Film Industry

In a 2018 interview with Alawari Media, Williams expressed his disagreement with the term "Nollywood" to describe the Nigerian film industry. He argued that the name, seemingly modeled after "Hollywood," lacked cultural relevance and failed to reflect Nigeria's unique heritage. Williams proposed the alternative name "Camwood," referencing a tree indigenous to West Africa traditionally used in art and cultural practices. He believed this name would better encapsulate the essence of Nigerian cinema.

Williams also voiced concerns about the industry's structure, criticizing the government's insufficient support and the prevalence of untrained individuals entering the field. He advocated for proper structuring and increased governmental involvement to foster a more organized and professional film industry in Nigeria.

== Later life and struggles ==
Despite his accolades, Williams faced considerable hardships later in life. In a candid interview, he revealed his struggles with homelessness and deteriorating eyesight, highlighting the financial and social challenges that many veteran Nigerian entertainers endure. Williams expressed disappointment over the lack of support from both the government and the industry he helped build, emphasizing the need for better structures to support aging artists in Nigeria.

== Awards and recognition ==
In recognition of his contributions to the arts, Williams was awarded the Member of the Order of the Federal Republic (MFR) by the Nigerian government. He also received a Lifetime Achievement Award from President Goodluck Ebele Jonathan in 2013.

== Legacy ==
Williams' influence on Nigerian theatre, film, and literature is profound. His dedication to the performing arts and his role in mentoring emerging talents have left an indelible mark on the industry. His works continue to inspire generations of actors and writers in Nigeria.
