= Affairs of the Heart (film) =

2017 Nigerian film directed by Robert Peters

- Film poster
- Directed by: Robert Peters
- Screenplay by: Diane Diaz
- Produced by: Neville Sajere
- Starring: Stella Damasus; Joseph Benjamin; Beverly Naya; Joel Rogers
- Release date: 2017
- Running time: 98 minutes
- Country: Nigeria
- Language: English

Affairs of the Heart is a 2017 Nollywood film that tells a story about the feelings and emotions that a lady has for a man which cause her whole life to fall apart.

== Cast ==
- Stella Damasus as Vivienne
- Beverly Naya as Stella
- Joseph Benjamin as Eric
- Divine Shaw as Evelyn
- Cycerli Ash as Louisa
- Nosh Joseph Oshinboyejo as Mike
- Monica Swaida as Defense Attorney
- Stephanie Stevens as Prosecuting Attorney
- Joel Rogers as Doctor
- Glenn Turner as Judge
- J.L. Bolden as Car Salesman
- John Schmedes
