= The Grave Dust =

2015 film by Ikechukwu Onyeka

- Theatrical release poster
- Directed by: Ikechukwu Onyeka
- Written by: Ugezu Ugezu; Saint Joseph
- Produced by: Obi Madubogwu
- Starring: Ramsey Nouah; Joke Silva; Joseph Benjamin; Amaka Chukwujekwu
- Cinematography: Richard Mabiaku
- Edited by: Paul Apel Papel
- Music by: Majek Fashek
- Production companies: Crown Prince Productions; Papel Image Studios
- Distributed by: Silverbird Film Distribution
- Release date: May 29, 2015
- Country: Nigeria
- Language: English

The Grave Dust is a 2015 Nigerian supernatural romantic thriller film, directed by Ikechukwu Onyeka, starring Ramsey Nouah, Joke Silva, Joseph Benjamin and Amaka Chukwujekwu.

== Synopsis ==
The film tells the story of Johnson, an orphaned young stockbroker who is abandoned by his girlfriend Clara because of his history of misery, doom and death. Johnson falls into depression and it takes the spirit from the grave to fight for his justice of love.

== Cast ==
- Ramsey Nouah as Johnson Okwuozo
- Amaka Chukwujekwu as Clara
- Joseph Benjamin as Jordan
- Joke Silva as Jordan's mother
- Emaa Edokpaghi as the Mortician
- Paul Apel Papel as House Keeper
- Emeka Okoro as Chijioke

== Production and release ==
According to the producer Madubogwu, The Grave Dust is one of the most unusual stories he has encountered; as a result, much attention was paid to its success. Majek Fashek produced the soundtrack and music score for the film. Trailer of The Grave Dust was released on YouTube on 24 November 2014. The film was initially scheduled to premiere in November 2014, but was postponed to 8 May 2015. The film was eventually released on 29 May.

== Reception ==
Nollywood Reinvented rates the film 43%, commending Ramsey Nouah as the standout act and praising the music, but notes that the film dragged in the middle. It concluded that The Grave Dust "was interestingly woven and revealed, writing-wise. However, somewhere in execution – with the poor acting, the excessive music, occasional fluctuating audio, questionable effects, etc. – it was setback. It was not entirely lost in translation but it could have amounted to much more than it did". Amarachukwu Iwuala of 360Nobs heavily criticized the screenplay and visual effects, commenting "Onyeka serves his audience a film that not only moves at snail’s pace, but one that has been told time and again; the characters and situations created by the screenwriter are very familiar. Most followers of Nollywood are constantly in search of fascinating films that will thoroughly entertain them and also task their imaginations at the same time. Indeed, there are a couple of horror flicks and thrillers that fit this bill, but The Grave Dust woefully falls below expectations in almost every regard".
