= Amasike Emelonye =

Nigerian film producer

Amasike Emelonye (born 5 November 1962) is a Nigerian film producer, a technocrat, a philanthropist and motorsports coach. He produced the film Last Flight to Abuja (2012), and in February 2020 was a guest on the Nigerian Outdoor Reality TV Series Camp Out 9ja (2020) written by Success Akpojotor and anchored by Soba Mac Pepple of KUFM. He was the managing director of Zinox Computers and has provided ICT National infrastructure with INEC, NPC, NUC, etc
