= Couple of Days =

2016 Nigerian Romantic comedy film

- Directed by: Tolu Lordtanner
- Screenplay by: Tolu Awobiyi
- Produced by: Ayo Orunmuyi
- Starring: Lilian Esoro; Adesua Etomi Wellington; Eyinna Nwigwe; Ademola Adedoyin; Kiki Omeili; Olayode Juliana; Falz
- Edited by: Adekunle Bryan Oyetunde
- Distributed by: FilmOne Production
- Release date: 5 February 2016
- Countries: Ibadan, Oyo state, Nigeria
- Language: English

Couple of Days is a 2016 Nigerian romantic comedy film directed by Tolu Lordtanner and produced by Ayo Orunmuyi. It broke box office records upon its release, achieving the highest ticket sales in a single day for any Nollywood movie in cinemas in February 2016. The film stars Lilian Esoro, Adesua Etomi Wellington, Eyinna Nwigwe, Ademola Adedoyin, Kiki Omeili, Olayode Juliana and Falz. It was released on 5 February 2016 and premiered on Netflix in 2019.

== Plot ==
The film tells the story of three different couples who go on a romantic getaway and how they handle the realities of marriage and its consequences.

== Cast ==
- Adesua Etomi-Wellington as Nina
- Enyinna Nwigwe as Jude
- Kiki Omeili as Joke
- Okey Uzoeshi as Dan
- Lilian Esoro
- Ademola Adedoyin
- Falz
