= Meet the Adebanjos =

- Genre: Sitcom
- Created by: Debra Odutuyo; Andrew Osayemi
- Written by: Debra Odutuyo; Andrew Osayemi; Nick Withers; Jessica Golding; Seun Boy
- Directed by: Debra Odutuyo
- Starring: Wale Ojo; Yetunde Oduwole; Andrea Ama Aboagye; Daniel Davids; Moji Bamtefa
- Country of origin: United Kingdom
- Original language: English
- No. of series: 3
- No. of episodes: 50

Production
- Executive producer: Andrew Osayemi Debra Odutuyo
- Producer: Andrew Osayemi Debra Odutuyo Jenny Stimpson
- Production locations: London, UK
- Running time: 24 minutes
- Production company: MTA Productions

Original release
- Network: Netflix; The Africa Channel International; M-Net; SABC 2
- Release: 6 April 2012 – present

Related
- Desmond's; The T-Boy Show

Meet the Adebanjos is a single-camera sitcom created by Debra Odutuyo and Andrew Osayemi and produced by MTA Productions. Centred on a Nigerian-British family living in Peckham, South London the show focuses on the larger-than-life patriarch Bayo Adebanjo as he struggles to instill his old-fashioned African values within his reluctant British family.

The sitcom began as a revolutionary self-funded web series in 2011 and quickly became an international hit on televisions across the globe as it was shown in countries like Nigeria, Ghana, South Africa and Uganda. Since its launch, the programme has gained a devoted following in the African-British community.

== Production ==
Meet the Adebanjos began life in 2011 as a web series that was self-funded by the show's creators, Andrew Osayemi and Deborah Odutayo. The comedy stems from the typical ups and downs of family life, and the patriarch Bayo's rivalry with the equally larger-than-life and rather eccentric Auntie Funke.

== Cast and characters ==
=== Main cast and characters ===
- Wale Ojo as Bayo Adebanjo
- Yetunde Oduwole as Gladys Adebanjo
- Andrea Ama Aboagye as Sade Adebanjo
- Daniel Davids as Tobi Adebanjo
- Moji Bamtefa as Aunty Funke
- Jordan Coulson as Kevin (Series 1-2)

=== Minor cast and characters ===
- Tolulope Ogunmefun as Cousin Femi (Series 1-3)
- Andrew Apraku as Pastor Michael (Series 1-3)
- Lateef Lovejoy as Greg (Series 1-3)
- David Erdos as Tony (Series 2-3)

== Episodes ==
Three seasons have been produced so far, with a total of 50 episodes.

Season 2 premiered in the UK on channel OHTV in 2014 and on Africa Magic/M-Net in Africa.

In December 2015, it was announced that the third season of Meet the Adebanjos will launch on the multi-ethnic content service Lebara Play. The third season was made available to watch from the beginning of 2016 and included 19 new episodes, adding up to a total of 50 episodes produced.

Following the pick-up of the series by Netflix, a fourth season is currently in development.

== Reception ==
Meet the Adebanjos has been critically acclaimed and recognised by a number of awarding bodies, including ZAFAA, NEL, Screen Nation Film and Television Awards, BEFFTA, and The Black Comedy Awards UK.
