= Alter Date =

- Directed by: Marc Adebesin
- Produced by: Marc Adebesin & Yemisi Banjoko
- Starring: Iyabo Ojo, Bolanle Ninalowo and Kenneth Okolie
- Release date: 2019
- Country: Nigeria
- Language: English

Alter Date is a 2019 Nigerian romantic comedy movie directed by Marc Adebesin and produced by Yemi Banjoko. The film stars Iyabo Ojo, Bolanle Ninalowo, and Kenneth Okolie.

== Synopsis ==
The movie revolves around three friends who are looking for love. The first one needs a rich man to maintain her standard, the second one is not lucky with men and the last one is romantically helpless and she always falls in love with the wrong men.

== Cast ==
- Iyabo Ojo
- Bolanle Ninalowo
- Kenneth Okolie
- Frederick Leonard as Timi
- Tana Adelana
- Lilian Esoro
- Lanre Afod
- Amarachi Amusi
- Joseph Momodu
- Yemisi Banjoko

== Release ==
The movie was screened on April 17, 2019, at Silverbird Cinema, Ikeja City Mall, Lagos.

== Awards and nominations ==
The movie won seven awards and received 25 nominations excluding an award from GAP Awarding Body for contributing to the images of Africa.
