= Journey to Self =

2012 film by Tope Oshin

- Theatrical poster
- Directed by: Tope Oshin
- Written by: Ashionye Michelle Raccah
- Produced by: Ashionye Michelle Raccah
- Starring: Nse Ikpe-Etim; Ashionye Michelle Raccah; Dakore Akande; Katherine Obiang; Tosin Sido
- Cinematography: Adekunle Adejuyigbe
- Edited by: Adekunle Adejuyigbe
- Music by: Tee-Y Mix; Carl Raccah
- Production companies: Fressia Entertainment; AlleyKat Media; Freesia Entertainment
- Distributed by: Africori; Blue Pictures
- Release dates: 21 November 2012 (Lagos premiere); 10 May 2013 (Nigeria)
- Running time: 120
- Country: Nigeria
- Language: English

Journey to Self is a 2012 Nigerian drama film written and produced by Ashionye Michelle Raccah and directed by Tope Oshin, starring Nse Ikpe-Etim, Dakore Akande, Ashionye Michelle Raccah, Katherine Obiang and Tosin Sido. It received a nomination for the category Achievement In Soundtrack at the 9th Africa Movie Academy Awards. The film tells a story of 5 childhood friends who converge at the home of one of them who just died, she leaves a series of letters that explains her struggles through life and eventually leading to their "self discovery".

== Plot ==
The film tells a story of 5 childhood friends that converge at the home of the deceased Uche reading a series of letters she left that explains her struggles through life and eventually leading to their self-discovery.

Rume (Katherine Obiang) is married to a man, whom she later discovered was a "crossdresser", she filed for divorce after several attempt to make him normal proved abortive. however he pleaded with her to stage infidelity as the reason for the divorce to avoid disgrace and societal outrage from family and friends for his eccentric lifestyle.

Uche (Tosin Sido) was married off by her dad as the 4th wife to a former business colleague as a remedy for an unpaid debt. As soon as it was revealed that she was barren, she began suffering an emotional breakdown caused by her much older husband and his jealous wives.

Regina (Ashionye Michelle Raccah) is a full housewife that is being assaulted by her husband, Their 2 kids were also affected by the domestic violence.

Nse (Nse Ikpe Etim) had a son when she was younger and her husband is yet to know about it.

Alex (Dakore Akande) is an entertainment celebrity that has been very unlucky with men taking advantage of her tenderheartedness.

== Cast ==
- Nse Ikpe-Etim as Nse
- Dakore Akande as Alex
- Ashionye Michelle Raccah as Regina
- Katherine Obiang as Rume
- Tosin Sido as Uche
- Carol King as Stella
- Kalu Ikeagwu as Joe
- Femi Brainard as David
- Chris Attoh as Dapo
- Femi Jacobs as Uzo

== Reception ==
Journey to Self received mixed to positive reviews from critics with Nollywood Reinvented giving it a 54% rating. The reviewer described the film as not fitting into the typical Nollywood formula. "Just because it’s not what we’re used to doesn’t make it a bad movie. It had a point to convey, it sent that point home and it ended. Simple and short." Sodas and Popcorn gave it 4 out of 5 rating and states "It has a strong message about self-discovery, being independent, standing up for yourself. The best part is the fact that the movie succeeds in communicating all these lessons effectively." "I had an eighteen month old baby to raise and a husband who doesn't know whether he wants to be a mummy or a daddy" has been noted as being a memorable line from the movie.

== Awards ==
Award	Category	Recipient	Result
Africa Movie Academy Awards	Achievement in Soundtrack	Tee Y Mix	Nominated
Nollywood Movies Awards	Best Movie	Ashionye Michelle Raccah	Nominated
Nollywood Movies Awards	Best Director	Tope Oshin Ogun	Nominated
Nollywood Movies Awards	Best Editing	Adekunle "Nodash" Adejuyigbe	Won
Nollywood Movies Awards	Best Sound Design	Carl Raccah	Nominated
Nollywood Movies Awards	Best Costume Design	Yolanda Okereke	Nominated
Nollywood Movies Awards	Best Makeup	Toby Ejiro Jeje- Philip & Korede Olowoyo	Nominated
Best of Nollywood Awards	Best Actress in a supporting role	Katherine Obiang	Nominated
Best of Nollywood Awards	Best Child Actor (male)	Dozie Onyiriuka	Nominated
Best of Nollywood Awards	Movie with the Best Social Message	Ashionye Michelle Raccah	Won
Africa Magic Viewers Choice Awards	Best Sound Editing	Carl Raccah	Nominated
Africa Magic Viewers Choice Awards	Best Actress in a Drama	Nse Ikpe Etim	Won
2014 Nigeria Entertainment Award	Best Movie	Ashionye Michelle Raccah	Nominated
2014 Nigeria Entertainment Award	Best Director	Tope Oshin- Ogun	Nominated
2014 Nigeria Entertainment Award	Best Actress	Nse Ikpe Etim	Nominated

== See also ==
- List of Nigerian films of 2012
