= Stormy Hearts =

- Directed by: Tope Alake
- Written by: Brenda Ogbuka and Chijioke Ononiwu
- Produced by: Judith Audu
- Starring: Christiana Martin, Theresa Edem-Isemin, Eddie Watson, Kenneth Okolie, Fred Amata, Etinosa Idemudia, Kelechi Udegbe, Greg Ojefua, Rotimi Salami, Stan Nze.
- Release date: 2017
- Country: Nigeria
- Language: English language

Stormy Hearts is a 2017 musical movie written by Brenda Ogbuka and Chijioke Ononiwu. It was produced by Judith Audu and directed by Tope Alake under the collaboration studio of Judith Audu's Productions and Iroko TV. The movie stars Christiana Martin, Theresa Edem-Isemin, Eddie Watson, Kenneth Okolie, Fred Amata, Etinosa Idemudia, Kelechi Udegbe, Greg 'Teddy Bear' Ojefua, Rotimi Salami, Stan Nze, and others.

== Synopsis ==
The story revolves around a music producer who was left by his student and girlfriend for a bigger musician in town. He met a repentant prostitute, and they started a new life.

== Award and nominations ==
The movie was nominated in the category of the Movie with the Best Soundtrack and Movie with the Best Use of Nigerian Food at the 2017 Best of Nollywood Awards.

== Cast ==
- Tokunbo Uba Ahmed as Bartender
- Fred Amata as Mr. Bako
- Theresa Edem as Kachi
- Etinosa Idemudia as Preye
- Tomiwa Kukoyi as Lekan
- Christiana Martin as Ella
- Ogee Nelson as Mimi
- Stan Nze as Doctor
- Greg 'Teddy Bear' Ojefua as Kosi
- Kenneth Okolie as Johnson
- Debbie Ohiri Oletubo as Agnes
- Rotimi Salami
- Kelechi Udegbe as Gold Digger
- Omoye Uzamere as Phemie
- Eddie Watson as Bassey
