= Brother's Keeper (2014 film) =

2014 film directed by Ikechukwu Onyeka

- Theatrical Poster
- Directed by: Ikechukwu Onyeka
- Screenplay by: Kehinde Olorunyomi
- Produced by: Okey Ezugwu
- Starring: Majid Michel; Omoni Oboli; Beverly Naya; Barbara Soki
- Release date: February 7, 2014
- Country: Nigeria
- Language: English

Brother's Keeper is a 2014 Nigerian thriller drama film directed by Ikechukwu Onyeka, and starring Majid Michel, Omoni Oboli, Beverly Naya and Barbara Soky.

== Cast ==
- Majid Michel as Chude / Chidi Nwankwo
- Omoni Oboli as Mena
- Beverly Naya as Cassandra Okoro
- Barbara Soky as Mrs. Nwankwo
- Moyo Lawal as Ada
- Tobi Oboli as Daniel / David
- Ikechukwu Onyeka as DPO
- Chigozie Atuanya as Assassin 1
- Kelvin Uvo as Assassin 2

== See also ==
- List of Nigerian films of 2014
