= Broken (2013 film) =

2013 film by Bright Wonder Obasi

- Theatrical poster
- Directed by: Bright Wonder Obasi
- Written by: Bright Wonder Obasi
- Produced by: Bright Wonder Obasi
- Starring: Nse Ikpe Etim; Kalu Ikeagwu; Bimbo Manuel; Chucks Chyke
- Cinematography: Shalom Uyi Enabulele
- Edited by: Century Favor Ebere
- Production company: High Definition Film Studio
- Distributed by: Paulo Concepts
- Release date: 28 March 2013
- Running time: 122 minutes
- Country: Nigeria
- Language: English

Broken is a 2013 Nigerian drama film written, produced and directed by Bright Wonder Obasi, starring Nse Ikpe Etim, Bimbo Manuel and Kalu Ikeagwu. It received six nominations at the 2013 Nollywood Movies Awards including awards for Best lead actor, Best Supporting actor, Best Supporting Actress, Best Cinematography, Best Make-up and Best Rising star Female.

== Plot ==
The film is about Samuel Gabriel who falls into the trap of Policemen while trying to sell hard drugs. He tried escaping but was ambushed by several of them. His interrogation at the police station was aborted when the interrogating officer was being blackmailed by his guardian for violating his fundamental human rights some years ago as a minor. After his release he was informed that his sister Emmanuella was alive but with a mental condition and asthma. He visited her at the asylum and after much persuasion and assurance he was eventually allowed to take her home.

Mariam & Morris Idoko are not home and two of their children Cassia and Pamela are alone with the housemaid. After a brief knock on the day and a prompt response from Anna, Gabriel suddenly entered the house with Emmanuella on his hands, and hurriedly tries to remedy her asthma attack.

Morris got them arrested for intruding his home on his arrival to the disapproval of his wife. She later revealed to him that Gabriel and Emmanuella were actually her kids from a previous marriage, he however angrily ignored her and slept off. The eccentric nature & emotional pain suffered by Gabriel and Emmanuella created several incidents that made Anna and Pamela to become uncomfortable in the house. These made Morris to prompt his wife to sort out her issues and not allow it affect their matrimonial home.

Mariam told her husband and children that she is the biological mother of Emmanuella and Samuel. To her surprise, Morris confessed to being the biological father of the housemaid Anna, Miriam spoke to Anna about her knowledge and feelings on her dad's rejection and how she was able to create a cordial relationship with her lost kids, she replied that love is what all families needed. Anna passionately reconciled with Morris then advised Mariam to make peace with all her children. Miriam narrates her ordeal from her previous marriage to Emmanuella and Samuel, they were shocked when she mentioned they had a brother. On visiting the orphanage Samuel discovered that his brother has been sold and is in prison. Mariam visits Gabriel Ortega after 16 years and informs him that his children are residing in her home. Samuel eventually met his brother Eric in prison where he explained what led to his death sentence.

== Cast ==
- Nse Ikpe Etim as Mariam Idoko
- Kalu Ikeagwu as Gabriel Ortega
- Bimbo Manuel as Morris Idoko
- Sydney Diala as Bishop
- Iyke Adiele as Samuel Ortega
- Chucks Chyke as Eric Ortega

== See also ==
- List of Nigerian films of 2013
