= Barbara Soky =

Nigerian actress and former singer

- Born: Barbara Soky; Nigeria
- Citizenship: Nigeria
- Occupations: Actress, former singer

Barbara Soky (born Bara Sokoroma) is a Nigerian actress and former singer who rose to fame in the TV soap Mirror in the Sun. Following a hiatus after various roles in the 1980s and 1990s, Soky revived her acting career, appearing in Nollywood movies and other soaps.

== Acting ==
Soky's first major acting role was as office receptionist Rosemary Hart in the NTA series Inside Out. Originally an NTA Port Harcourt production, the sitcom gained popularity across Eastern Nigeria following syndication within other NTA stations via exchange. Soky also had a part alongside Adiela Onyedibia in You Can't Take Your Wife to New York, a series about a Nigerian ambassador with an illiterate wife.

After Inside Out ended, Rivers-native Soky moved to Lagos where she starred in Lola Fani-Kayode's serial Mirror in the Sun. Her role as Yinka Fawole, a seductive young woman in love with two polar opposites, shot her to national stardom and led to a commercial for Jik bleach. After Mirror in the Sun, Soky was among the original cast of Ripples as unlucky-in-love city lawyer Daphne Wellington-Cole, from 1988 to 1993. Soky would later reprise her role in the show's 2022 revival Ripples: The New Generation.

After a 13-year hiatus that briefly saw her venture into television presenting, Soky returned to acting with the Amaka Igwe production Solitaire as Nkoyo Broderick, a woman determined to protect the family's wealth. Most recently, she has appeared in the series Journey of the Beats.

== Music ==
In 1986, Soky released the album Going Places under Mercury Records. Prior to earning a record deal, her character Rosemary in Inside Out had sung on the show.

== Awards ==
In 2013, Soky was named Best Actress in a Supporting Role at the 2013 Nollywood Movies Awards for her performance in the film Bridge of Hope. In 2014, she received the same nomination for her role in the film Brothers Keeper at the Africa Movie Academy Awards.

== Personal life ==
Soky has a daughter, Maxine.

== Filmography ==
Year	Title	Role	Notes
2004	Standing Alone 2	Lady Claudia	Drama
2006	Saviour	Cynthia	Drama
2008	Mission to Nowhere	Naomi Adams	Drama
2010	Tango with Me	Uzo's Mother	Drama / Family / Romance
2012	Mr. and Mrs.	Mrs. Abah	Drama / Family / Romance
2012	Black November	Ebiere's Mother	Action / Crime / Drama / Thriller
2013	Lonely Heart	Tiana	Drama
2014	Brother's Keeper	Mrs. Nwankwo	Thriller
2018	Love, Food and Everything in Between	Ngozi	Romance
2021	Marrying a Campbell	Granny D	Comedy
2021	Andauotu	Ageless Goddess	Drama
