= Kemi Adesoye =

Nigerian screen writer

- Born: Oluwakemi Adesoye; Kaduna, Kaduna State, Nigeria
- Occupation: screenwriter
- Years active: 1998–present

Kemi Adesoye is a Nigerian screen writer, best known for writing the critically acclaimed film The Figurine. She has also written several episodes of the television series Tinsel.

== Early life and education ==
Adesoye, a descent of Kwara, was born and raised in the capital of the northern state of Kaduna. She is the youngest of four children.

Adesoye grew up watching films, which cut across various genres such as comedies, thrillers, westerns, dramas and soaps. She gained admission into the university to study architecture. While Adesoye was still an undergraduate, her passion for writing grew when she stumbled on a book titled The Elements of Script Writing by Irwin R. Blacker, in her school's science library. At this time, she wasn't aware that scriptwriting was a profession. She later furthered in her field and obtained a master's degree from the Federal University of Technology, Minna, Niger State.

In the early stages of her writing venture, she was faced with challenges due to the non-existence of scriptwriting schools in Nigeria at the time, as well as lack of encouragement from people. However, after realizing her love for screenwriting, Adesoye started learning scriptwriting from the internet and subsequently took a screenwriting course at New York Film Academy in the United States.

== Career ==
After graduation, Adesoye worked in a radio station for five years, while writing on the side. She wrote her first script in 1998. She attended a workshop at IFBA International Film and Broadcast Academy, where she learnt of an M-Net sponsored project called "New Direction". The company was looking for short stories, and she sent in the short script, titled "The Special Gele". The script was eventually selected, along with four other semi finalists. Although she didn't win the competition, she got the encouragement she needed to push further. Two years later, she entered for another edition of the same competition and won, with her script converted into a short film; she competed the following year and won again.

The New Directions project offered Adesoye the opportunity to meet Nigerian filmmakers like the late Amaka Igwe and other film producers. Subsequently, Adesoye got on board for the DStv-produced medical series Doctors Quarters. She continued to get average jobs, until she met Kunle Afolayan, for whom she wrote the thriller film The Figurine. The film received widespread critical acclaim and won several major awards, including five Africa Movie Academy Awards.

The overwhelming success of The Figurine catapulted Adesoye into one of the most sought after writers in Nollywood; she started writing for major television series such as: Edge of Paradise, Tinsel, Hotel Majestic, and several feature films; including the acclaimed romantic comedy Phone Swap.

== Filmography ==
=== Film ===
- Omugwo (2017)
- Fifty (2015)
- New Horizons (Short) (2014)
- African Metropolis (2013)
- The Line-Up (Short) (2013)
- Phone Swap (2012)
- The Figurine (2009)
- Prize Maze

=== Television ===
- Hotel Majestic (2015–2016)
- Shuga - season 3 (2013)
- Tinsel (2008–present)
- Edge of Paradise (2006-)
- Doctors' Quarters (2005–2006)

== Awards and recognitions ==
Year	Award	Category	Work	Result
2012	2012 Best of Nollywood Awards	Screenplay of the Year	Phone Swap	Nominated
2013	2013 Nollywood Movies Awards	Best Original Screenplay	Phone Swap	Won
2013	2013 Golden Icons Academy Movie Awards	Best Original Screenplay	Phone Swap	Nominated
