= Project Fame =

Television series

Project Fame is a pan-African version of the international talent/reality show Star Academy. Held in Johannesburg, South Africa from June to August 2004, the show had 16 African contestants – 9 of them South Africans – groomed for stardom, with the weakest being eliminated on a weekly basis; the top three received record deals and the winner got a lot more prizes.

The contestants were eliminated in the following way: the judges placed four contestants on probation, the teachers could saved one, the other contestants could save another and viewers could save a third, thereby eliminating the last contestant. As the show progressed, the number of contestants placed on probation rose to five, resulting in two contestants being eliminated. The last five remaining contestants' fates were determined by viewers' votes.

An East African version; Tusker Project Fame (season 1), aired from 1 October to 17 December 2006. It continues to run each year and the latest is Tusker Project Fame season 4 which ended on 6 December 2010, and won by Ugandan Davis Hillary Ntare.

The show was described as Idols meets Big Brother Africa as the contestants' daily activities were recorded 24 hours a day.

== Final results ==
| Rank | Contestant | | Date of elimination | Ref |
|---|---|---|---|---|
| 1 | Lindiwe Alam | Zambia | winner | |
| 2 | Jonathan Ross | South Africa | 29 August | |
| 3 | Daré Art Alade | Nigeria | 29 August | |
| 4 | Tebogo Moloto | South Africa | 29 August | |
| 5 | Tracey-Lee Oliver | South Africa | 29 August | |
| 6 | Johan du Plooy* | South Africa | 22 August | |
| 6 | Monica Burger | South Africa | 22 August | |
| 8 | Kudzai Sevenzo* | Zimbabwe | 15 August | |
| 8 | Karen Lucas | Kenya | 15 August | |
| 10 | Claudia Mohr* | South Africa | 8 August | |
| 10 | Steve Peralta | South Africa | 8 August | |
| 12 | Didge Nyatome | Kenya | 1 August | |
| 13 | Robyn Hendricks | South Africa | 25 July | |
| 14 | Tumi Ramailane | South Africa | 18 July | |
| 15 | Carl "Bodea" Eckle | Tanzania | 11 July | |
| 16 | Jid'dah Ado-Ibrahim | Nigeria | 4 July | |

*These contestants performed better than their equally
ranked contestants as they were on probation less often.
