= Lilian Esoro =

Actress

- Born: 8 March 1982 (age 44); Lagos, Nigeria
- Education: University of Abuja
- Occupations: Actress, Media Personality and CEO of Lioca Spa,
- Years active: 2006–present
- Known for: Role as Nurse Abigail in movie Clinic Matters. CEO of Lioca Spa
- Spouse: Ubi Franklin (m.2015 - div.2020)
- Children: 1

Lilian Esoro (born 8 March 1982 Lagos, Nigeria) is a Nigerian actress, socialite, media personality, and businesswoman. Lilian Esoro was nominated for best actress in a comedy at 2013 Africa Magic Viewers' Choice Awards.

== Career ==
Esoro's acting career started in 2005 when she was cast by her friend Bovi to feature in the soap opera Extended Family. However, she became more notable when she was featured in the television series Clinic Matters playing Nurse Abigail.

In a 2013 list compiled by Vanguard, Esoro was listed as one of the top ten best new actresses in the film industry.

== Personal life ==
Esoro grew up in Lagos State. She studied political science at University of Abuja.

In November 2015, she married Ubi Franklin. The couple divorced in January 2020.

== Filmography ==
=== Films ===
Year	Title	Role
2013	Strive	
2013	I Voted Now Wetin	Amaka
	The Next Door Neighbour	
2013	Secret Room	Edna Ojei
2015	Fool's Paradise	Mildred
2015	The Real Deal	
2016	Couple of Days	Cynthia
2017	Meet the In-Laws	Ifeanyi
2018	A Lot Like Love	Jasmine
2018	Merry Men: The Real Yoruba Demons	Mrs Anyanwu
2019	Jumbled	Adaeze
2019	Alter Date	
2020	Divorce	Amaka
2020	All Shades of Girls	Edwin
2021	April Showers	Linda
2022	The Meddler	Bankole's Wife
2022	Her	Mrs. Thompson
2023	Different Strokes	Onyinye
2023	The Special Assistant	Vanessa
2024	Casa De Novia	Ezinne

=== Television ===
Year	Title	Role	Notes
	Extended Family	Freida	
2021	Tinsel		
	Clinic Matters	Nurse Abigail	
	Taste of Love		
	Colour of deceits		

== Awards and nominations ==
Year	Award	Category	Result	Ref
2013	Africa Movies Viewers' Choice	Best Actress in a Comedy	Nominated	
2019	Best of Nollywood Awards	Best Kiss in a Movie	Nominated	

== See also ==
- List of Nigerian actors
