= Lola Fani-Kayode =

Nigerian television producer

- Citizenship: Nigerian
- Occupation: Television producer
- Known for: creation of Mirror in the Sun and Mind-Bending
- Notable work: Mirror in the Sun

Lola Fani-Kayode is a Nigerian television producer known for the creation of Mirror in the Sun and Mind-Bending, an educative and information television program about the dangers of drug addiction starring Joke Silva and Akin Lewis. She is a cousin of Femi Fani-Kayode. Lola, alongside other female filmmakers was described as, "women who validated the Margaret Thatcher dictum which holds that the best man for the job is a woMAN." Her profile was captured in a book titled "Ladies Calling the Shots," that focused on female film directors. The book was written by Niran Adedokun, a Lagos-based public relations practitioner, lawyer and writer.

== Filmography ==
- Mirror in the Sun, soap opera, aired 1984–1986.
- Mind Bending
