= Kenneth Okolie =

Nigerian actor & model (born 1984)

- Born: Kenneth Obinna Okolie; 21 February 1984 (age 42); Anambra, Nigeria
- Education: Valley View University
- Occupations: Actor; Model
- Years active: 2006-Present
- Height: 6 ft 2 in (1.88 m)
- Spouse: Nwaka Jessica (m. 2017)
- Children: 1

Kenneth Obinna Okolie (born 21 February 1984) is a Nigerian actor, model and beauty pageant titleholder who was crowned Mr Nigeria 2010 and won the City People Movie Award for Best Supporting Actor of the Year (English) at the 2015 City People Entertainment Awards.

== Early life and education ==
Okolie is a native of Ihiala in Anambra State, a southeastern geographical area of Nigeria predominantly occupied by the Igbo people of Nigeria. Okolie is the firstborn child of his parents and has three siblings. He graduated with a B.Sc. degree from Valley View University in Ghana.

== Modelling and acting career ==
Okolie, before his debut into the Nigerian movie industry, began as a model in 2006, which he described as a coincidence, as he merely escorted a friend to an audition for models and never intended to participate in the auditioning process. He was compelled to audition by the organisers, which he accepted. He was successful in the audition and was selected, marking the start of his modelling career. In 2010, four years after beginning his modelling career, Okolie participated in the Mr Nigeria male pageant and won. After winning the pageant, Okolie competed in the Mister World pageant and finished as the second runner-up. Okolie debuted in the Nigerian movie industry in 2011. Okolie described his venture into the Nigerian movie industry also as a coincidence, as he never intended to be an actor.

In 2015, Okolie won the City People Movie Award for Best Supporting Actor of the Year (English) at the City People Entertainment Awards.

== Personal life ==
Okolie married Nwaka Jessica in 2017 and in 2019, she gave birth to their first child. Okolie had a crush on Nse Ikpe-Etim and Ufuoma Ejenobor.

== 2012 Kidnap case ==
In 2012, Okolie travelled to Owerri, the capital of Imo State, to shoot a movie alongside Nollywood colleague Nkiru Sylvanus. On 15 December 2012, it was reported that Okolie and Nkiru Sylvanus had been abducted, and their captors demanded a ransom of ₦100,000,000 (one hundred million naira), which was equivalent to $640,000 (six hundred and forty thousand U.S. dollars) at the 2012 exchange rate. On 21 December 2012, at 10:30 p.m., after six days in captivity, Okolie and Nkiru Sylvanus were released. The amount ultimately paid for their release was never disclosed by the Nigerian media.

== Selected filmography ==
Movies
Year	Movie Title	Character
2011	Aina	Bako
2013	Keeping My Man	Lanre
2015	House Husband	Chude
2015	Gbomo Gbomo Express	Jealous Guy
2015	The Department	Moses
2015	Lunch Time Heroes	Mr Ishola
2016	25th Birthday	Melvin
2016	Trouble Comes To Town	Benny
2016	A Girl’s Note	Ken
2017	Evol	Kamari
2017	Strangers	Reginald
2017	Mystified	Teddy
2017	Stormy Hearts	Johnson
2017	Next Door	
2017	The Royal Hibiscus Hotel	Deji
2016	My Name is Kadi	Tyler
2019	Different Worlds	Ike
	Molly’s Love Story	Tony
	Black Coffee	Francis Adu
2019	Alter Date	
2019	Reaction	Desmond
2019	Snap	Jerry
2019	Mr & Mrs ABAKOBA	Ifeanyi
2019	Drifted( When a soldier loves)	Ola
	Just a wish	Dave
2019	A Friendly Fire	Daniel
2019	Royal Tussle	Umenna
	This is not a love story	Kolawolé
2019	Borrowed Heart	
2018	Dear Ijeoma	Nicolas
2018	Hit and Run	
2018	A toast to a heart break	Michael
2018	Tripod	
	A long walk to nothing	
2018	3 some	Mark
2016	Reconciliation	
	My Silence	
2017	Stranger than ever	
2016	No strings attached	Peter
	Wedlock	
	Bride with Gun	
	Lunch Times Heroes	
2016	Espionage	
2016	Kazbar	
2017	Date Night	Henry
	A haunted Marriage	
	Open Scars	
2017	Ruth	
2016	One Bite	
2015	The Sassy One	Scott
	Promises are forever	Dan
2015	Deluded	
	Love isn't enough	
2020	The Cleansers	
2020	Stroke of luck	
2019	The Tea Room	
2020	A Tiny Line	
2019	Olive	
2019	Izunna	
2019	Rising Above	Chidi
	Oath of silence	
2019	Heart Ripper	
2018	Love and Shadow	Izunga
2018	Strength of love	
2018	Imperfect Me	
	Crumbles cookies	
2010	Fatal Attraction	Ade
2019	The right kind of wrong	
2019	Jumbled	Damilola
2019	Mothers and daughters in law	Kunle
2019	Don't get mad Get Even	Julius
	Mr Black	
	RIFT	
	Lovers or Loosers (LOL)	
	Ignition	
	Chances	
	Ufuoma	
	True vows	
2015	The department	Moses
	Rubbles of love	
	Just 2 hours	
2016	A Girl's Note	Ken
	Alera's Diary	
	PayBack	
2020	Nneka the Pretty Serpent	Tony Okechukwu

== TV series ==
TV-Series
Year	TV Series Title	Character	Seasons
2013	Desperate House Girls		1-2
2015	Husbands of Lagos	Akinlolu	1-2-3
2018	Ojukwu	Odili	1-2
	Poison Ivy		
	The Suncity	Chris	1
	Singles Ladies		
	Before 30		
2016	Skinny Girl in Transit	Femi	

== Awards and nominations ==
Year	Award	Category	Result	Ref
2015	City People Entertainment Awards	Best Supporting Actor	Won	
2019	Best of Nollywood Awards	Best Kiss in a Movie	Nominated	
