= Joseph Benjamin (actor) =

Nigerian actor

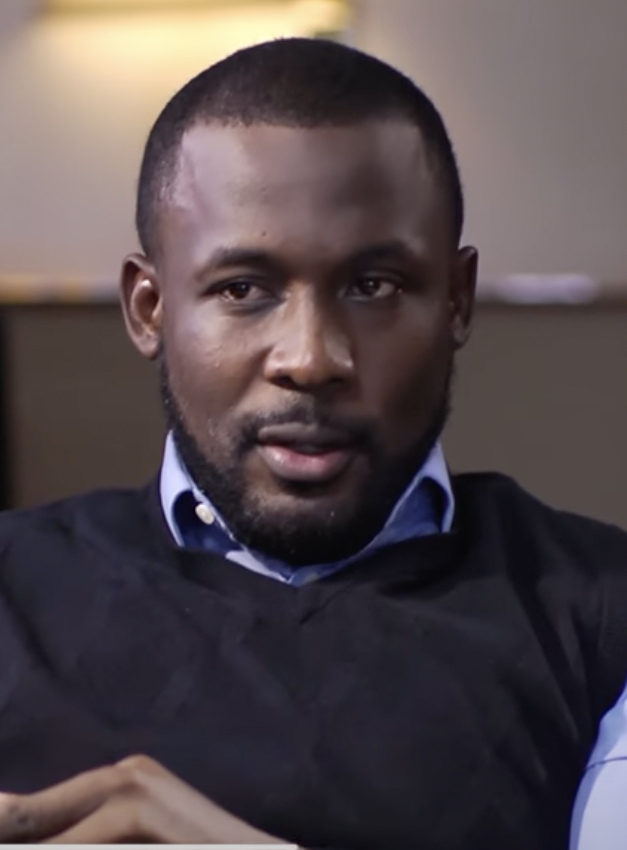
- Joseph Benjamin in 2008
- Born: 9 November 1977 (age 48); Lagos State, Nigeria
- Occupations: Actor, model, TV presenter, voice-over artist, singer
- Years active: 1995–present
- Known for: Co-hosting MTN's Project Fame
- Notable work: Tango with Me
- Awards: 2012 Best of Nollywood Awards for Best Lead Actor

Joseph Benjamin (born 9 November 1977) is a Nigerian actor, model, singer, Voice-over Artist and television presenter mainly known for co-hosting MTN's Project Fame, a talent reality show, and starring in the movies Tango With Me, Mr. and Mrs., and Murder at Prime Suites. He won the African Actor of the Year award at the 2012 African Film Awards. He won "Best Lead Actor in an English film" for his role on Married but Living Single at the 2012 Best of Nollywood Awards.

== Personal life ==
Joseph was born on 9 November 1977, to a Kogi State indigene father and an Anambra State mother. Joseph Benjamin completed his primary school education in Benue State in the north-central part of Nigeria. He obtained his First School Leaving Certificate, after which he completed his secondary school education in Lagos State in the south-western part of Nigeria and obtained his West African Senior School Certificate. Joseph relocated to the United States in 2016, where he currently resides. He identifies as a born-again Christian.

== Career ==
=== Early career ===
Joseph made his movie debut in Crossroads, in 1995 (alongside Ramsey Nouah and Sandra Achums); however, his screen debut was earlier, when he appeared at age 12 in the television program Tales by Moonlight on NTA.

=== Nolly breakthrough and TV personality ===
Since his on-screen debut in Tales by Moonlight, Benjamin has starred in several television series, including Edge of Paradise, in which he was being "crushed on" by his neighbor's daughter, and Super Story. His definite breakthrough in film came in the early 2010s, with roles in romantic-themed films such as Kiss and Tell, Tango With Me, which was nominated for five Africa Movie Awards, and Married but Living Single. He broke typecasting in 2013 by playing a detective in the crime thriller Murder at Prime Suites (MAPS), which was inspired by an actual murder case in Lagos, in which a woman first met her killer on Facebook. Shortly after completing MAPS, Benjamin joined the cast of Desperate Housewives Africa, the Nigerian remake of the American hit series, playing the role of Chuka Obi(Carlos Solis), alongside Kehinde Bankole. He co-hosted, with Adaora Oleh, MTN Project Fame West Africa between 2009 and 2016, and has appeared in TV and radio commercials.

=== Singer ===
Having sung in a choir since his early twenties, Joseph launched a career in professional singing in 2012, collaborating with singer Sabina on the album Merry Christmas that year. A devout Christian, he has since specialized in the gospel and inspirational genre with the singles Joy in 2016 and I Pour My Love in 2020. He has stated that he considers himself a musician first and foremost. He recently dropped single, and he is working on releasing an EP in 2022.

== Filmography ==
=== Films ===
Year	Title	Role	Notes
1991	Cross Roads		
2003	Deadly Misson	Dotun	
2009	Jungle Ride	Akin	
2009	Spellbound		
2010	Kiss and Tell	Iyke	with Monalisa Chinda, Desmond Elliot & Nse Ikpe Etim
2010	Kidnap		
2010	Tango with Me	Uzo	
2011	Mr. and Mrs.	Ken Abbah	with Nse Ikpe Etim & Barbara Soky
2011	Courier		
2012	Married but Living Single	Mike	with Funke Akindele & Joke Silva
2012	Stripped	Coco Simba	With Ramsey Nouah, Beverly Naya,
2012	Torn		With Julius Agwu, Monalisa Chinda
2012	Unfair		
2012	Darkside		
2012	Faith		
2012	Contract	Kuuku	With Doris Ansah, Jasmine Baroudi, Katouchka Addaquay
2013	Murder at Prime Suites	Agent Ted	
2013	First Cut	Kunle Lewis	alongside Lisa Omorodion and Monalisa Chinda
2014	Mum, Dad, meet Sam	Josiah Abiola	With Daniella Down, Tino Orsini
2014	Few good Men	Fred	With Boma Adukeh, Otas Bazuaye
2014	Blind Promise		
2014	Secret Box		
2014	Iyore	Prince Eweka – Azuwa	
2014	Folly		
2014	A Few Good Men	Wale	Feature Film directed by Ejiro Onobrakpor and featuring Deyemi Okanlawon
2015	The Grave Dust	Jordan	with Ramsey Nouah & Joke Silva
2015	Omoge Ofege		with Femi Adebayo & Ireti Osayemi
2016	Rebecca	Clifford	
2017	Isoken	Osaze	
2017	Affairs of the Heart	Eric	
2020	Special Jollof		with Uche Jumbo
2020	The Love Between Us	Desmond	with Raz Ayer, Ikenna Alily, Carl Allen Jr.
2021	Back to Kinship		with Stanley Enow
2022	Stay	Tega	with Theo Bray
2023	The Bargain	Steve	with Greg Agalaba, Sira Bah
2025	Baby Farm		with Rita Dominic and Genoveva Umeh

=== Television ===
Year	Title	Role	Notes
2003	Deadly Mission		
2005	Just Me	Kayode	
2005	Travails of Faith	Sam	
2005–2006	Edge of Paradise	Michael	1 episode
2005–2006	Young, Single and free		
2007	Super story		
2007	Bachelors		
2007	168 A love Story		
2008–2013	Tinsel	Tega	212 episodes
2015	Desperate Housewives Africa	Chuka Obi	20 episodes
2015–2016	Losing Control	Kunle	39 episodes
2017	Claws	Relative	1 episode
2019	Greenleaf	Joseph Obi	2 episodes
2019	Last Call	Charles O Marley	1 episode
2022	Atlanta (TV series)	Black Male Actor	Work Ethic!

== Awards and nominations ==
Year	Award	Category	Result	Ref
2012	Nollywood Movies Awards	Best Actor in a Leading Role (Kiss and Tell)	Nominated	
2012	Nollywood Movies Awards	Best Actor in a Leading Role (Tango with Me)	Won	
2014	Africa Movie Academy Award	Best Actor in a Leading Role (Murder at Prime Suites)	Nominated	
2015	Golden Movie Awards	Golden Actor	Nominated	
2017	Best of Nollywood Awards	Best Actor in a Lead role – English (Dance to My Beat)	Nominated	
