= Victor Akande =

Nigerian politician and lawyer

Lagos State House of Assembly member
- Incumbent
- Assumed office 6 August 2015
- Constituency: Ojo I

Personal details
- Born: Olusegun Victor Akande Ojo, Lagos State, Nigeria
- Died: July 30, 2025
- Party: People's Democratic Party
- Occupation: Politician lawyer

Olusegun Victor Akande is a Nigerian politician and lawyer. He represents Ojo Constituency I in the 8th Legislative Assembly of the Lagos State House of Assembly since 6 August 2015 under the platform of the People's Democratic Party.
