= IRS Airlines =

Nigerian airline

IATA	ICAO	Call sign
IS	LVB	SILVERBIRD
- Founded: 2002
- Ceased operations: 2013
- Hubs: Murtala Muhammed International Airport; Nnamdi Azikiwe International Airport
- Frequent-flyer program: T-plus
- Fleet size: 4
- Destinations: 6
- Headquarters: Abuja, Nigeria
- Key people: Rabiu Isyaku-Rabiu; Yemi Dada
- Website: www.flyirsairlines.com

IRS Airlines Limited was an airline based in Abuja, Nigeria. It operated scheduled domestic passenger services. Its main base was Nnamdi Azikiwe International Airport. The airline was established in 2002 and started operations in March 2002. It ceased operations in 2013. The company slogan was Now you can go places.

== Destinations ==
IRS operated scheduled services to the following domestic destinations as of February 2013.

- Nigeria
  - Abuja – Nnamdi Azikiwe International Airport Hub
  - Kaduna – Kaduna Airport
  - Kano – Mallam Aminu Kano International Airport
  - Lagos – Murtala Muhammed International Airport Hub
  - Maiduguri – Maiduguri International Airport
  - Yola – Yola Airport

== Fleet ==
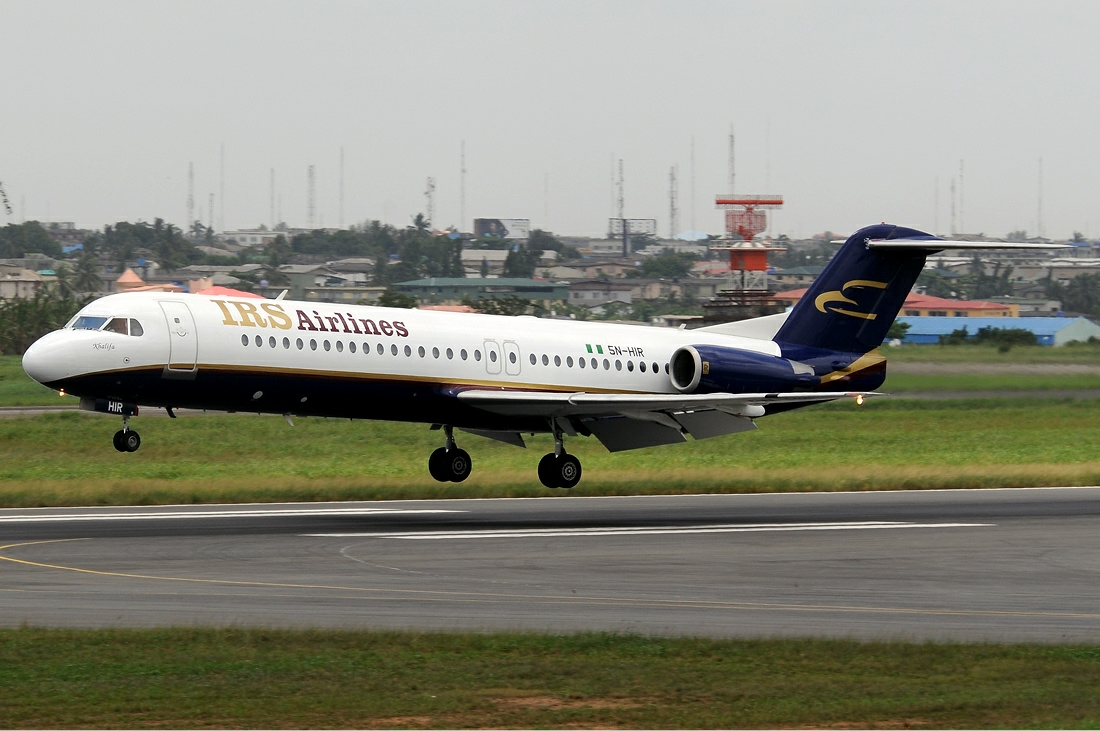
A Fokker F100 belonging to the airline at Murtala Muhammed International Airport

The IRS Airlines fleet included the following aircraft (as of August 2016):

IRS Airlines fleet
Aircraft	In fleet	Order	Passengers	Notes
Fokker 100	4	0	100	
Total	4	0		

== Accidents and incidents ==
- On 29 June 2005, a Fokker 100, registered 5N-COO, was returning to Lagos after the plane developed hydraulic problems. While taxiing, the landing gear collapsed. No one was injured, but the aircraft was written off.
- On 11 May 2014, an IRS Airlines Fokker 100, registered 5N-SIK, returning from a post-maintenance check-up crashed near the township of Ganla, Niger. The two pilots survived with undisclosed injuries.
