= Nse Ikpe-Etim =

Nigerian actress (born 1974)

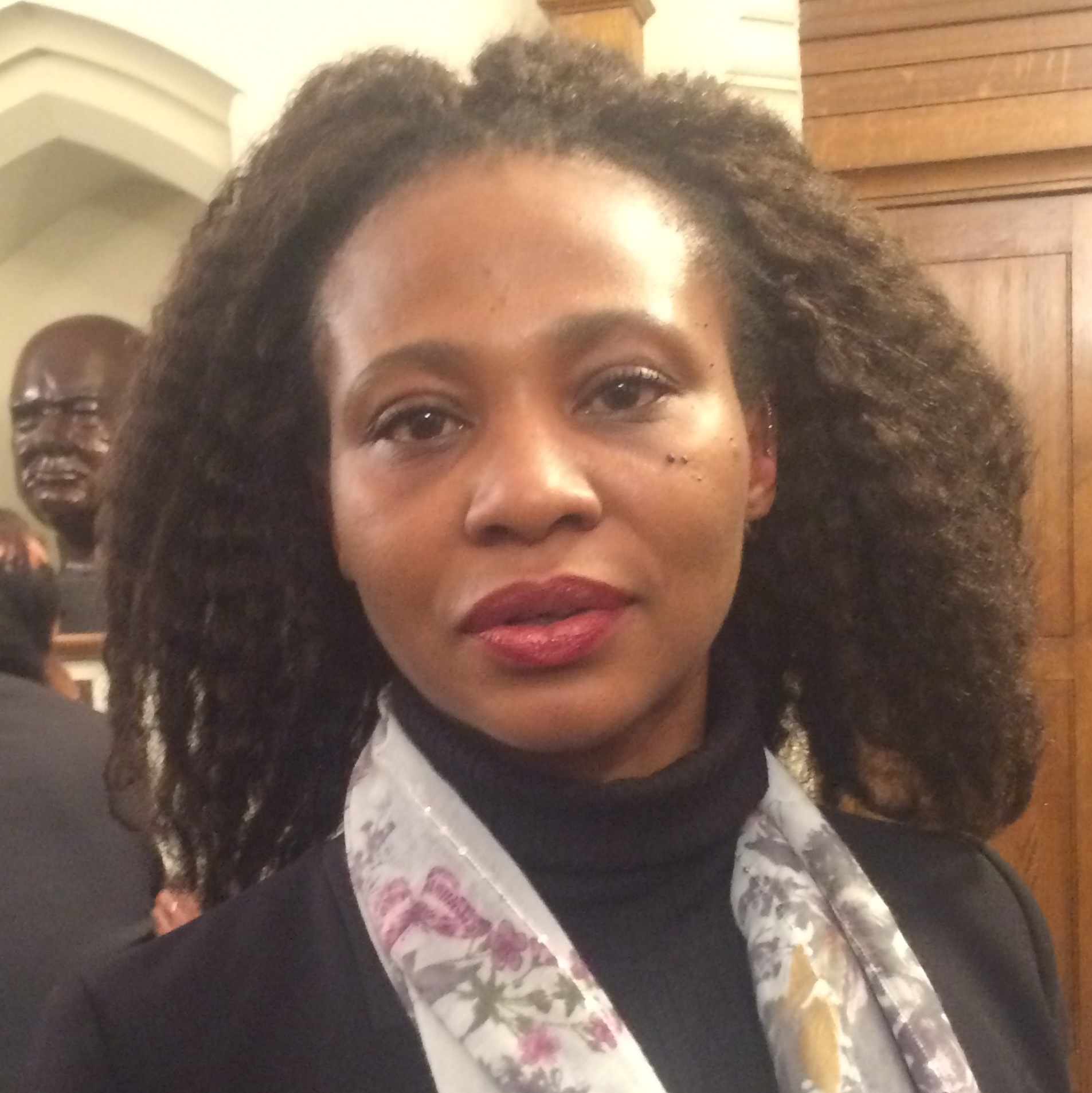
- Ikpe-Etim in 2016
- Born: Nse Ikpe-Etim; 21 October 1974 (age 52); Lagos, Lagos State, Nigeria
- Citizenship: Nigerian
- Education: University of Calabar
- Occupation: Actress
- Spouse: Clifford Sule (m. 2013)
- Awards: 2014Africa Magic Viewers Choice Awards for Best Actress in a Drama.
- Website: http://www.nseikpeetim.com

Nse Ikpe-Etim (born 21 October 1974) is a Nigerian actress. She came into prominence in 2008 for her role in Reloaded. She was nominated for Best Actress in a Leading Role at the 5th and 8th Africa Movie Academy Awards for her role in Reloaded and Mr. and Mrs., respectively. In 2014, she won the Best Actress in a Drama award at the 2014 Africa Magic Viewers Choice Awards (AMVCA) for playing "Nse" in Journey to Self.

== Early life ==
Etim was born on 21 October 1974 in Lagos. Etim attended Awa Nursery School and Command Primary School in Kaduna State in northern Nigeria, from where she then furthered her studies at Louis College, Jos in Plateau State, Nigeria, and the Federal Government Colleges in Jos and Ilorin. She said that her family was often transferred to various regions of Nigeria due to her father's career with the Central Bank of Nigeria. Etim got her first degree in Theater Arts from the University of Calabar.

== Personal life ==
Etim is the first of six children. In an interview with Toolz, she stated that she had Caucasian Godparents. She married her childhood friend Clifford Sule on 14 February 2013 at a Lagos registry. A traditional wedding ceremony followed in her hometown in Akwa Ibom State and Lagos State,some months after the civil union. She currently resides in London with her husband, a senior lecturer at Middlesex University and frequents Nigeria for film engagements.

On Friday 20 March 2020, she posted on her Instagram page that she had just returned from the United Kingdom, one of the hardest hit places by COVID-19, according to the Federal Ministry of Health. She, however,followed the directives of Nigeria Center for Disease Control(NCDC) to be self-isolated. She received support from colleagues, such as Rita Dominic, Chika Ike, Iyabo Ojo among others.

== Career ==
At 18, Etim started acting on stage plays at the university. Her first television appearance was in the family soap Inheritance. After graduating from the university, she temporarily left the film industry to pursue other endeavors before making a comeback with Emem Isong's Reloaded alongside Ramsey Nouah, Rita Dominic, Ini Edo and Desmond Elliot.

In December 2019, Nse Etim was featured in the Visual Collaborative Polaris catalogue under the Supernova series for humanities. She was interviewed alongside people such as: William Coupon, Bisila Bokoko and Ade Adekola.

In 2020, she was in the cast of Quam's Money a follow-up to the 2018 film New Money directed by Tope Oshin. The sequel follows what happens when a security guard (Quam) suddenly becomes a multi-millionaire. The new cast was led by Falz, Toni Tones, Jemima Osunde, Blossom Chukwujekwu and Nse Ikpe-Etim.

In february 2021, she played the lead role alongside Richard Mofe-Damijo and Zainab Balogun in Seyi Babatope movie direction, Fine Wine

She recently starred in the 2023 Netflix limited series Shanty Town.

== Filmography ==
Year	Film	Role	Notes
2003	Emotional Crack	Associate Producer	
	Venom of Justice 2		
2008	Reloaded	Omoze	with Ramsey Nouah, Desmond Elliot Rita Dominic, Ini Edo, Uche Jombo & Stephanie Okereke; Nominated for Best actress in a leading role at the 5th Africa Movie Academy Awards
2010	Bursting Out	Tena	with Genevieve Nnaji, Susan Peters & Majid Michel
2010	Inale	Ori	with Caroline Chikezie, Hakeem Kae-Kazim & Ini Edo
2011	Guilty Pleasures	Liz	with Ramsey Nouah, Majid Michel, Stephanie Okereke & Desmond Elliot
2011	Memories of My Heart		with Ramsey Nouah, Ini Edo, Uche Jombo & Monalisa Chinda
2011	Kiss and Tell	Tena	with Joseph Benjamin, Desmond Elliot, Uche Jombo & Monalisa Chinda
2011	Spellbound	Mary	with Joseph Benjamin, Desmond Elliot, Uche Jombo & Chioma Chukwuka
2012	Phone Swap	Mary	with Wale Ojo, Joke Silva & Lydia Forson
2012	Mr. and Mrs.	Susan Abbah	with Joseph Benjamin & Barbara Soky
2012	The Meeting	Bolarinwa	with Rita Dominic, Femi Jacobs, Kate Henshaw, Jide Kosoko & Chinedu Ikedieze
2012	Journey to Self	Nse	with Dakore Akande & Chris Attoh
2012	Black November	Lawyer	with Mickey Rourke, Vivica Fox, Hakeem Kae-Kazim & Kim Basinger
2013	Broken	Mariam Idoko	with Kalu Ikeagwu & Bimbo Manuel
2013	Blue Flames	Vanessa	with Omoni Oboli & Kalu Ikeagwu
2014	Devil in the Detail	Helen Ofori	with Adjetey Anang
2014	Hustlers	Blessing	with Chelsea Eze & Clarion Chukwura
2014	Tunnel		with Femi Jacobs and Waje
2014	In Between		with Pascal Amanfo
2015	The Visit	Ajiri Shagaya	with Blossom Chukwujekwu, and Femi Jacobs
2015	The Green Eyed	Roli	with Kalu Ikeagwu and Tamara Eteimo
2015	Heaven's Hell	Alice Henshaw	with Bimbo Akintola, OC Ukeje and Damilola Adegbite
2015	Fifty	Kate	with Ireti Doyle, Omoni Oboli and Dakore Akande
2016	Stalker	Kaylah	with Jim Iyke, and Caroline Danjuma
2016	A Trip to Jamaica	Abigail Rise	with Ayo Makun, Funke Akindele
2017	American Driver	Nse Ikpe-Etim	with Evan King, Jim Iyke, Anita Chris, Nse Ikpe Etim, Nadia Buari, Emma Nyra, Ayo Makun, Laura Heuston, McPc the Comedian, Michael Tula, Andie Raven
2020	Quam's Money	Ozzy	Falz, Toni Tones, Jemima Osunde, Blossom Chukwujekwu and Nse Ikpe-Etim.
2021	Fine Wine	Ame	with Richard Mofe-Damijo Belinda Effah and Zainab Balogun
2021	King of Boys: The Return of the King	First Lady Jumoke Randle	with Sola Sobowale, Toni Tones, Reminisce and Illbliss
2022	Glamour Girls	Donna	With Sharon Ooja, Toke Makinwa, Joselyn Dumas
2023	A Tribe Called Judah	Collette	With Funke Akindele, Timini Egbuson, Uzor Arukwe
2023	Love and Life	Osas	With Rita Dominic, Chidi Mokeme, Michelle Dede
2023	The Bargain	Folake Seymour	With Joseph Benjamin, Greg Agalaba
2023	A Sunday Affair	Uche	With Dakore Akande, Moses Akerele, Oris Erhuero
2023	I Hate It Here	Bokime	With Adebowale Adedayo, Toyin Oshinaike, Adebola-Walter Tiwalola
2024	Devil is a Liar		Drama
2024	A Song from the Dark	Isioma William	Directed by Ogodinife Okpue

== Awards and nominations ==
Year	Award	Category	Film	Result	Ref
2009	5th Africa Movie Academy Awards	Best Actress in a Leading role	Reloaded	Nominated	
2009	2009 Best of Nollywood Awards	Revelation of the Year (female)		Nominated	
2010	2010 Nigeria Entertainment Awards	Best Actress Film/Short Story	Reloaded	Won	
2010	2010 Best Of Nollywood Awards	Best Actress in a Leading role	Guilty Pleasures	Nominated	
2011	2011 Best of Nollywood Awards	Best Actress in a Lead role	Mr. and Mrs.	Won	
2012	2012 Nigeria Entertainment Awards	Best Lead Actress	Mr. and Mrs.	Nominated	
2012	8th Africa Movie Academy Awards	Best Actress in a Leading Role	Mr. and Mrs.	Nominated	
2012	ZAFAA Awards	Best Actress in a supporting role	Kiss and Tell	Nominated	
2012	ELOY Awards	Actress of the Year	Phone Swap	Nominated	
2012	2012 Nollywood Movies Awards	Best Actress in a Supporting Role	Kiss and Tell	Won	
2012	2012 Best of Nollywood Awards	Best lead Actress in an English Movie	Phone Swap	Won	
2012	2012 Best of Nollywood Awards	Best Actress in a supporting role	The Search	Nominated	
2012	2012 Best of Nollywood Awards	Best kiss in a film	Spellbound	Nominated	
2012	17th Africa Film Awards (Afro-Hollywood Awards)	Best Actress in a Supporting Role		Nominated	
2013	2013 Nollywood Movies Awards	Best Actress in a Leading Role	Mr. and Mrs.	Nominated	
2013	2013 City People Entertainment Awards	Best Actress of the Year		Nominated	
2013	2013 Golden Icons Academy Movie Awards	Best Actress	Phone Swap	Nominated	
2013	2013 Ghana Movie Awards	Best African Collaboration	Purple Rose	Nominated	
2013	2013 Nigeria Entertainment Awards	Best Supporting Actress in a film	Kiss & Tell	Nominated	
2014	2014 Africa Magic Viewers Choice Awards	Best Actress in a Drama	Journey to Self	Won	
2014	2014 Nigeria Entertainment Awards	Best Actress in a Lead Role	Journey to Self	Nominated	
2014	2014 Golden Icons Academy Movie Awards	Best Actress in a Leading Role	Purple Rose	Nominated	
2014	2014 Golden Icons Academy Movie Awards	Viewers's Choice Female	Purple Rose	Nominated	
2015	2015 Best of Nollywood Awards	Best actress in a Leading Role (English)	Stolen Water	Won	
2015	2015 Best of Nollywood Awards	Best Kiss in a Movie	Stolen Water	Nominated	
2015	2015 Golden Icons Academy Movie Awards	Best Actress	Stalker	Won	
2015	2015 Golden Icons Academy Movie Awards	Best On-screen Duo	Stalker	Nominated	
2016	2016 Africa Magic Viewers Choice Awards	Best Actress TV Series/Drama	The Visit	Nominated	
2016	2016 Nigeria Entertainment Awards	Lead Actress In A Film	The Visit	Nominated	
2016	12th Africa Movie Academy Awards	Best Actress In A Leading Role	Fifty	Nominated	
2022	Africa Magic Viewers' Choice Awards	Best Actress in A Comedy	Quam's Money	Nominated	
2023	Africa Magic Viewers' Choice Awards	Best Actress In A Drama, Movie Or TV Series	Shanty Town	Nominated	
2023	Africa Movie Academy Awards	Best Actress in Leading Role	4:4:44	Won	
2023	Africa International Film Festival	Globe Award Honoree		Won	
