= The Meeting (2012 film) =

2012 Nigerian romantic comedy film

- Theatrical poster
- Directed by: Mildred Okwo
- Written by: Tunde Babalola
- Produced by: Rita Dominic; Mildred Okwo
- Starring: Femi Jacobs; Rita Dominic; Linda Ejiofor; Kehinde Bankole; Jide Kosoko
- Cinematography: Jim Bishop
- Edited by: Okey Benson
- Music by: Truth
- Production company: Mord Pictures Production
- Distributed by: The Audrey Silva Company (TASC); Silverbird Distribution
- Release date: 23 November 2012
- Running time: 132 minutes
- Country: Nigeria
- Languages: English; Yoruba; Igbo
- Budget: ₦30 million

The Meeting is a 2012 Nigerian romantic comedy drama film produced by Rita Dominic & Mildred Okwo and directed by Mildred Okwo. It stars Femi Jacobs, Rita Dominic, Linda Ejiofor, Kehinde Bankole and Jide Kosoko with special appearances from Nse Ikpe Etim, Kate Henshaw and Chinedu Ikedieze. It received 6 nominations at the 9th Africa Movie Academy Awards and won the award for the category Achievement In Make-Up.

== Plot ==
The film opens at the Nnamdi Azikiwe International Airport, Abuja, with a phone conversation between Mr. Makinde Esho and his managing director. Makinde is reminded by his MD about how important it is for him to get an authorization from the Ministry of Land and return to Lagos with positive feedback. Just as Makinde is about to board a taxi, he is interrupted by Ejura, a female Corp member who pleads to share the ride, as she is short on cash and there is a long queue at the ATM. Makinde refuses at first, but after much persuasion from Ejura, he reluctantly agrees. Even though Ejura had promised earlier to remain quiet during the ride, her inquisitive nature gives Makinde facial expressions that prompt answers and eventually start a conversation.

Mr. Makinde arrives at the Ministry of Land and encounters Mr. Ugor being forced out of the building by security operatives. Makinde is in awe but manages to find his way to the reception desk to meet the minister's discourteous secretary, Clara Ikemba. He is unapologetically informed by Clara that his meeting, which was originally scheduled for 9:30 am, has been moved to 4:30 pm. Makinde retires his stance and joins the other appointees who are all seated to see the minister. While waiting, Clara informs the appointees that she sells recharge cards and cold drinks to cater for their needs as they wait to see the minister, Ejura also calls Mr. Makinde to thank him for the ride he gave to her earlier while he has lunch at a nearby eatery. Several hours pass and Makinde is yet to hear a word from the secretary about his rescheduled meeting. He decides to inquire about it from her but to his surprise, she informs him rudely that the minister has already left the office. Makinde argues that she could have told him and the others waiting, instead of making people waste their precious time. Clara replies him "OYO (meaning On Your Own) is their case", a slang which means every man is responsible to himself and she has no business telling them to wait or go home. The meeting is eventually rescheduled for the following day. Makinde checks into a hotel. While trying to fight boredom, Ejura calls and eventually joins Makinde in the hotel in a bid to keep him company.

Makinde is set to give his presentation to the minister on Tuesday morning, but just as the secretary is about to inform the minister of his presence, a group of Igbo kinsmen arrive at the reception. Hours pass on and the kinsmen conclude their meeting with the minister only for Clara to tell Makinde after a confrontation that the minister is having his lunch and cannot see anyone at the moment. Bolarinwa stylishly enters the reception room to the amazement of everyone present. From her brief chat with Clara, it is quite clear that she is a close friend to the secretary and the minister's mistress. Shortly after the conversation she is granted entry to see the minister. After a while, Makinde stands up to inquire from the secretary again only to be told she is closing. Makinde asks about his appointment, and she tells him the minister left 30 minutes ago. He tells her that she should have informed him, and other people waiting and give replies with her signature sentence "OYO is their case".

Makinde is forced to spend the night in Abuja. He later invites Ejura over to his hotel after she calls to inquire about his presentation. So starts their love story over five days of Makinde trying unsuccessfully to see the minister. While returning from a movie, they ultimately kiss and cuddle till the next morning. Makinde leaves for his appointment after asking her what she sees in him despite their age difference. He is later able to make his presentation to the minister and also catch up with his daughter's graduation ceremony. He later flies back to Abuja to spend his holiday with Ejura. The film ends with both kissing at the rooftop of a construction site which Ejura was supervising.

== Cast ==
- Femi Jacobs as Makinde Esho
- Rita Dominic as Clara Ikemba
- Linda Ejiofor as Ejura
- Kehinde Bankole as Kikelomo
- Jide Kosoko as MD
- Nse Ikpe Etim as Bolarinwa
- Chika Chukwu as Mrs. Kachukwu
- Collins Richard as Jolomi
- Kate Henshaw as Mrs. Ikomi
- Basorge Tariah Jr. as Professor Akpan Udofia
- Amina Ndim as Hajia
- Chinedu Ikedieze as Mr. Ugor
- Kenneth Uphopho as Telema

== Reception ==
=== Critical reception ===
The Meeting received critical acclaim. Nollywood Reinvented gave the film 78% and wrote "The Meeting is an embodiment of the things that we hope Nollywood will one day attain in all her movies: splendid acting with all round commendable performances, priority being placed on the story over the celebrities, music that has so much character, and an actual tangible original storyline". Sodas & Popcorn wrote "The meeting is simple. It has a very original ‘Nigerian story’ and one of the best screenplays I have seen in a while. A story of love, tribalism, preferential treatment which has loads of comical spectacles". Myne Whiteman of Romance Meets Life gave the film 4.5 out of 5 and commented "the movie ties everything so well together that I forgive the little foibles. It was refreshing to see new faces in the lead roles, and they were very good actors as well. Linda Ejiofor and Femi Jacobs have a chemistry that draws you in, delivering their dialogue with perfect timing and great acting". Toni Kan of DStv wrote "The Meeting is a beautiful movie driven by its story line and well-chosen cast of characters. It is a movie that sets out with pretty high ambitions, and it manages to achieve them all".

=== Awards ===
The Meeting received six nominations at the 9th Africa Movie Academy Awards including awards for categories Achievement In Costume Design, Achievement In Makeup, Best Nigerian Film, Best Actress In A Supporting Role for Linda Ejiofor, Best Actor In A Leading Role for Femi Jacobs and Best Actress In A Leading Role for Rita Dominic. It eventually won the award for the category Achievement In Make-Up. It also received 11 nominations at the 2013 Nollywood Movies Awards, Rita Dominic won award for Best actress in a film for her role in The Meeting at the 2013 Nigeria Entertainment Awards.

== See also ==
- List of Nigerian films of 2012
