= Mr. and Mrs. (2012 film) =

Mr. & Mrs.
- Theatrical release poster
- Directed by: Ikechukwu Onyeka
- Written by: Chinwe Egwuagu
- Produced by: Chinwe Egwuagu
- Starring: Nse Ikpe Etim; Joseph Benjamin; Thelma Okoduwa; Paul Apel
- Cinematography: Tom Robson
- Edited by: Papel Image Technology
- Music by: J-Martins
- Production company: Chinwe Egwuagu Productions
- Distributed by: Peculiar Communications Ltd
- Release date: March 2012
- Running time: 99 minutes
- Country: Nigeria
- Language: English
- Box office: ₦6,050,000

Mr. and Mrs. is a 2012 Nigerian romantic drama film written and produced by Chinwe Egwuagu and directed by Ikechukwu Onyeka, starring Nse Ikpe Etim, Joseph Benjamin, Barbara Soky, Thelma Okoduwa and Paul Apel.

== Cast ==
- Nse Ikpe Etim as Susan Abbah
- Joseph Benjamin as Kenneth Abbah
- Barbara Soky as Mrs Abbah
- Thelma Okoduwa-Ojiji as Linda
- Paul Apel as Charles
- Chioma Nwosu as Mrs Brown
- Mpie Mapetla as Monica
- Nonye Ike as Kate
- Beauty Benson as Maggie
- Paul Sambo as Mr Brown
- Babajide Bolarinwa as Mr Abbah

== Home media ==
The film was released on DVD on 20 August 2012. According to Chinwe, the performance of Mr. and Mrs. was commendable at the theatres and she's been receiving a lot of requests concerning the DVD release, so she thought the time was right for a DVD release. The film was first released in Ghana a week before the official DVD release and it was well received, with commendable sales in Gold coast the same week.
