= Genevieve Nnaji =

Nigerian actress, producer, and director (born 1979)

Genevieve Nnaji MFR
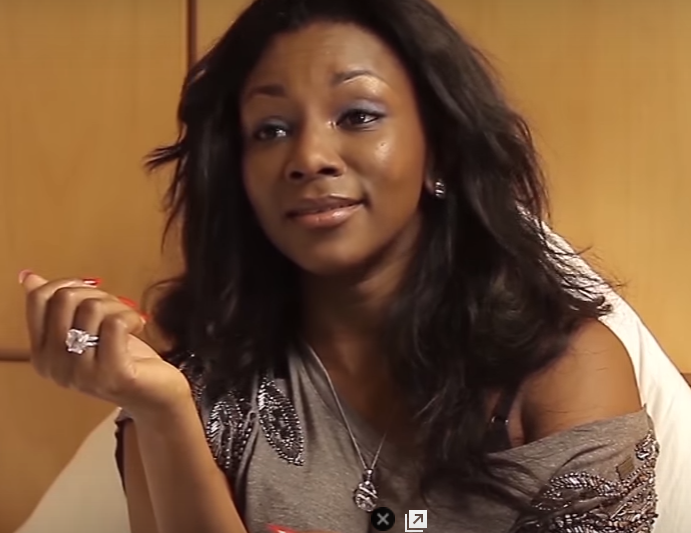
- Genevieve Nnaji in Weekend Getaway, 2012
- Born: 3 May 1979 (age 47); Mbaise, Imo, Nigeria
- Education: University of Lagos
- Occupations: Actress, director
- Years active: 1987–present
- Awards: 2005 Africa Movie Academy Award for Best Actress in a Leading Role

Genevieve Nnaji (/ˈnɑːdʒi/; born 3 May 1979) is a Nigerian actress, producer, and director. She won the Africa Movie Academy Award for Best Actress in a Leading Role in 2005, making her the first actor to win the award. In 2011, she was honoured as a Member of the Order of the Federal Republic by the Nigerian government for her contributions to Nollywood. Her directorial debut movie, Lionheart, is the first Netflix film from Nigeria and the first Nigerian submission for the Oscars. The movie was disqualified for having most of its dialogue in English. After having spent decades in the movie industry, she was profiled alongside some celebrities and business executives in 2020 in two books by the publisher and editor in chief of Yes International! magazine, Azuh Arinze.

== Early life ==
Nnaji was born in Mbaise, Imo State, located in the southeast region of Nigeria and grew up in Lagos, southwest Nigeria. The fourth of eight children, she was raised in a middle-class family; her father worked as an engineer and her mother was a nursery school teacher.

== Education ==
She attended Methodist Girls College (Yaba, Lagos) before proceeding to the University of Lagos, where she graduated with a bachelor's degree in creative arts. While at the university, she began auditioning for acting jobs in Nollywood.

== Career ==
Nnaji started her acting career as a child actor in the television soap opera Ripples at the age of eight. In 1998, at the age of 19, she was introduced into the growing Nigerian film industry with the movie Most Wanted. Her subsequent movies include Last Party, Mark of the Beast, and Ijele. In 2010, she starred in the film Ijé: The Journey. She has starred in over 200 Nollywood movies.

Nnaji, alongside eight other actors known as the G8, Omotola Jalade Ekeinde, Richard Mofe-Damijo, Emeka Ike, Ramsey Nouah, Nkem Owoh, Stella Damasus, and Jim Iyke, was banned in 2004 for charging excessively high fees. In the same year, Nnaji signed a recording contract with EKB Records; a Ghanaian record label, and released her debut album One Logologo Line. It was a mix of R&B, hip-hop and urban music. In 2004, Nnaji was voted the face of Lux.

In 2005, she won the Africa Movie Academy Award (AMAA) for Best Actress in a Leading Role, becoming the first actress to win the award.

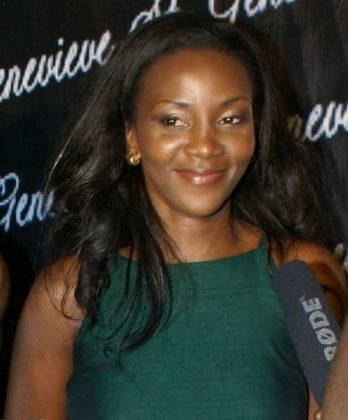
Genevieve at an event in 2009

In 2009, Nnaji was one of the highest-paid female actors in Nollywood. Due to her contributions to the Nigerian movie industry, she became the first actor to be awarded Best Actress at the 2001 City People's Awards, the award ceremony that previously had only recognised politicians and business conglomerates. She was also the first actor to be awarded Best Actress by the Censors Board of Nigeria in 2003. In 2009, she was referred to as the Julia Roberts of Africa by Oprah Winfrey.

In November 2015, Nnaji produced her first movie called Road to Yesterday, later winning Best Movie Overall - West Africa at the 2016 Africa Magic Viewers' Choice Awards.

In January 2018, it was reported that Nnaji would be replacing Funke Akindele as a member of the Dora Milaje in Marvel's Avengers: Infinity War. This was later debunked as an internet prank, and the actor did not appear in the movie.

On 7 September 2018, her directorial debut Lionheart was acquired by online streaming service Netflix, making it the first Netflix original film from Nigeria. The movie premiered at the 2018 Toronto International Film Festival, where she also appeared in Adewale Akinnuoye-Agbaje's autobiographical directorial debut Farming, alongside Kate Beckinsale, Damson Idris, and Gugu Mbatha-Raw.

In 2023, it was announced that Nnaji would return as an executive film producer with I Do Not Come to You by Chance, an adaptation of the novel by Adaobi Tricia Nwaubani, alongside Chinny Carter. The film features Blossom Chukwujekwu, Paul Nnadiekwe, Jennifer Eliogu, Sambasa Nzeribe, and Beverly Osu. It premiered at the Toronto International Film Festival but has not yet been officially released.

Nnaji is also a women's activist. She advocates for Nigerian girls to be able to have a say in who they choose to marry. She is against early marriages for the girl child. She advocates against the abuse of women in society. Nnaji has described herself as a feminist, stating that her type of feminism is that of a woman who has the right to make her own choices and do whatever she feels like.

In May 2026, Nnaji was named among the six honorees for the Women in Cinema Gala hosted by the Red Sea Film Foundation during the 2026 Cannes Film Festival.

=== Modelling ===
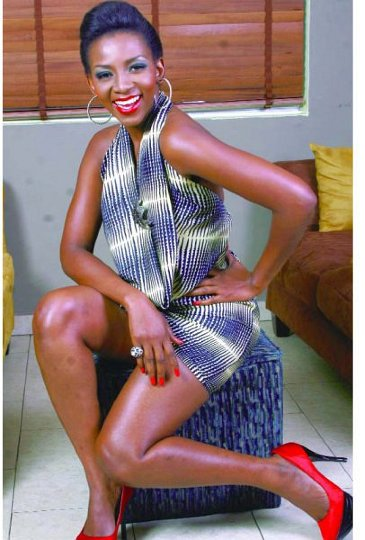
Nnaji in one of her several modelling campaigns.

Nnaji has featured in several commercials, including Pronto (beverage) and Omo detergent. In 2004, she became the "Face of Lux" in Nigeria. In 2008, Nnaji launched the clothing line "St. Genevieve", which donates its proceeds to charity. In May 2010, she was appointed as the "Face of MUD" in Nigeria.

== Awards and nominations ==
Nnaji has received several awards and nominations for her work, including the Best Actress of the Year Award at the 2001 City People Awards and the Best Actress in a Leading Role Award at the 2005 Africa Movie Academy Awards.

In 2019, her movie, Lionheart, was selected by the Nigerian Oscars Selection Committee (NOSC) as Nigeria's submission to the Best International Feature Film category of the 2020 Oscars. It was the country's first ever submission to the Oscars.

Subsequently, the Oscars submission was cancelled for not meeting the language criteria. The film's dialogue track was predominantly in the English language. However, the Oscar rules since 2006 dictate that eligible movies must have a "predominantly non-English dialogue track." This move was an attempt to open up more opportunities for films from diverse cultures.

In a viral tweet on 4 November 2019, filmmaker Ava DuVernay questioned the Academy's decision on nixing Lionheart Oscar race for using its official language—English. In response to Ava DuVernay's tweet, Nnaji wrote on Twitter that Nigeria has over 500 languages and is so ethnically diverse that English, as the official language, was the only viable choice to make the film acceptable to audiences across the country and beyond Africa.

In an article published by culture writer and multiculturalism scholar Kovie Biakolo titled "Nigeria's Lion Heart Disqualification is Bigger than the Oscars" on the CNN opinion website; Kovie opined that "one cannot help but feel that Nigeria is ultimately being penalised for being a former British colony in using the very language that was imposed on its people, to communicate between them, and especially for art. Former French, Spanish, and Portuguese colonies certainly don't have this problem. And in truth, the Academy may be demonstrating a short-sighted or surface-level understanding of its purported inclusivity in this category".

She went further to criticise the Oscar board for allowing the nominations of British movies that were not done in English, which invariably is the country's main language, but did so in the case of Nigeria, whose cultural diversity could be confounding yet true.

=== 92nd Academy Awards (Oscars) ===
Year	Nominee / work	Award	Result
2020	Genevieve Nnaji / LionHeart	Best International Feature Film	Disqualified

=== The 19th Black Reel Awards (FAAAF)] ===
Year	Nominee / work	Award	Result
2019	Lionheart	Outstanding Foreign Film / World Cinema Motion Picture	Won

=== Toronto International Film Festival ===
Year	Nominee / work	Award	Result
2018	Lionheart	Grolsch People's Choice Award	Nominated

=== Africa Movie Academy Awards ===
Year	Nominee / work	Award	Result
2005		Best Actress in Leading Role	Won
2008	30 Days/Keep My Will	Best Actress in Leading Role	Nominated
2011	Tango with Me	Best Actress in Leading Role	Nominated

=== Africa Magic Viewers Choice Awards ===
Year	Nominee / work	Award	Result
2013	The Mirror Boy	Best Actress Drama/TV Series	Nominated
2016	Road to Yesterday	Best Actress Drama/TV Series	Nominated
2016	Road to Yesterday	Best Movie West Africa	Won

=== Nigeria Entertainment Awards ===
Year	Nominee / work	Award	Result
2009		Best Actress	Nominated
2010	Silent Scandals	Best Actress Film/Short Story	Nominated
2010	Guinness Ultimate Survivor	Best Actress TV Series	Won
2011	Tango with Me	Best Actress Film/Short Story	Nominated
2013	Doctor Bello	Best Actress in Leading Role	Nominated
2014	Half of a Yellow Sun	Best Actress in Supporting Role	Won
2016	Road to Yesterday	Lead Actress in Film	Nominated
2016	Road to Yesterday	Best Picture	Nominated

=== Nollywood Movies Awards ===
Year	Nominee / work	Award	Result
2012	Tango with Me	Best Actress Leading Role	Nominated
2012	Herself	Viewers Choice- Female	Won

=== Ghana Movie Awards ===
Year	Nominee / work	Award	Result
2010	Silent Scandals	Best Actress-Africa Collaboration	Won

=== Golden Icons Academy Movie Awards ===
Year	Nominee / work	Award	Result
2012	Herself	Best Actress- Viewers Choice	Nominated

=== Nollywood and African Film Critics Awards (NAFCA) ===
Year	Nominee / work	Award	Result
2013	Weekend Getaway	Best Actress Leading Role	Won

=== Zulu African Film Academy Awards ===
Year	Nominee / work	Award	Result
2011	The Mirror Boy	Best Actress	Won

=== City People Entertainment Awards ===
Year	Nominee / work	Award	Result
2001	Herself	Best Actress	Won

=== Best of Nollywood Awards ===
Year	Nominee / work	Award	Result
2010	Silent Scandals	Best Actress-Leading Role	Nominated
2011	The Mirror Boy	Best Actress-Leading Role	Nominated
2011	Bursting Out	Best Kiss with Majid Michel	Won

== Filmography ==
Year	Film	Role	Notes
1987	Ripples		
1998	Most Wanted	Reporter	with Williams Cajethan
1999	Camouflage		with Ramsey Nouah
2001	Love Boat	Bimbo	with Ramsey Nouah
2001	Death Warrant	Anita	with Emeka Ike & Eucharia-Anunobi Ekwu
2002	Valentino	Doris	with Ramsey Nouah
2002	Fire Dancer	Nene	with Zack Orji and Chidi Mokeme
2002	Sharon Stone	Sharon Stone	with Funke Akindele
2002	Runs!	Adesua	with Gorgina Onuoha
2002	Power of Love	Juliet	with Ramsey Nouah, Grace Amah
2002	Formidable Force	Nike	with Gorgina Onuoha & Hanks Anuku
2002	Battle Line		with Ramsey Nouah & Pete Edochie
2003	Above Death: In God We Trust		with Pete Edochie, Kate Henshaw-Nuttal, Ramsey Nouah, & Zack Orji
2003	Blood Sister	Esther	with Omotola Jalade-Ekeinde & Tony Umez
2003	Break Up		with Ramsey Nouah
2003	Butterfly		with Ramsey Nouah
2003	By His Grace		with Tony Umez
2003	Church Business		with Ramsey Nouah & Segun Arinze
2003	Deadly Mistake		
2003	Emergency Wedding	Joy	with Tony Umez
2003	Emotional Tears	Helen	
2003	For Better for Worse		
2003	Honey		with Ramsey Nouah & Pete Edochie
2003	Jealous Lovers	Chioma	
2003	Keeping Faith: Is That Love?		with Richard Mofe-Damijo
2003	Last Weekend		with Ramsey Nouah
2003	Late Marriage		
2003	Love	Anita	with Richard Mofe-Damijo & Segun Arinze
2003	My Only Love	Angela	with Ramsey Nouah
2003	Not Man Enough		
2003	Passion & Pain	Maureen	with Ramsey Nouah & Desmond Elliot
2003	Passions		with Stella Damasus-Aboderin & Richard Mofe-Damijo
2003	Player: Mr. Lover Man		
2003	Private Sin	Faith	with Stephanie Okereke, Richard Mofe-Damijo, & Patience Ozokwor
2003	Sharon Stone in Abuja	Sharon Stone	
2003	Super Love	Amaka	with Ramsey Nouah & Pete Edochie
2003	The Chosen One		
2003	Women Affair	Brenda	
2004	Bumper to Bumper		with Georgina Onuoha
2004	Critical Decision		with Richard Mofe-Damijo, Stephanie Okereke, & Mike Ezuruonye
2004	Dangerous Sister	Judith	with Tony Umez & Dakore Egbuson
2004	Goodbye New York		with Rita Dominic
2004	He Lives in Me	Sheila	
2004	Into Temptation		with Ramsey Nouah
2004	My First Love		with Tony Umez
2004	Never Die for Love	Flora	
2004	Promise Me Forever	Sylvia	with Stephanie Okereke
2004	Stand by Me	Franca	with Nkechi Abuah Stella Chikereuba, and Dozie Eboh
2004	Treasure		with Chide Ihesie, David Ihesie, and Ofia Afuluagu Mbaka
2004	Unbreakable	Nkechi	with Ramsey Nouah
2004	We Are One	Nora	with Stella Damasus-Aboderin
2005	Darkest Night		with Richard Mofe-Damijo & Segun Arinze
2005	Games Women Play	Candace	with Stella Damasus-Aboderin, Desmond Elliot, & Zack Orji
2005	Rip-Off	Hellen	with Ramsey Nouah
2006	Girls Cot	Queen	with Rita Dominic & Ini Edo
2006	30 Days	Chinora Onu	with Segun Arinze – this film received 10 nominations at the Africa Movie Academy Awards in 2008, including Best Picture, Best Art Direction, Best Screenplay, Best Edit, Best Costumes, and Best Sound
2007	Letters to a Stranger	Jemima Lawal	with Yemi Blaq, Joke Silva, and Segun Arinze
2007	Keep My Will	Vivian	with Bukky Ajayi, Eric Erico, Chioma Anidiobi
2007	Warrior's Heart	Ihuoma	with Ozo Akubueze, Chikamso Chiawa, and Nick Eleh
2007	Unfinished Business	Nkem	with Patience Ozokwor, Desmond Elliot
2007	Winds of Glory	Juliana	with Desmond Elliot, Ofia Afuluagu Mbaka
2008	Beautiful Soul	Olivia	this film received 3 Africa Movie Academy Award nominations for Best Screenplay, Best Soundtrack, and Heart of Africa
2008	Broken Tears	Yvonne	with Van Vicker, Kate Henshaw-Nuttal and Grace Amah
2008	Critical Condition	Ify	with Chidi Mokeme, Priscilla Williamson
2008	River of Tears	Yvonne	with Kate Henshaw-Nuttal, Van Vicker, and Grace Amah
2008	My Idol		with Stan K. Amandi, Yemi Blaq
2008	Love My Way	Kayla	with Jim Iyke, Kalu Ikeagwu
2009	Silent Scandals	Jessie	with Majid Michel & Uche Jombo
2009	Felicima	Felicima	with Alex Lopez
2010	Ijé: The Journey	Chioma Opara	with Omotola Jalade Ekeinde, Odalys García, & Clem Ohameze
2010	Tango with me	Lola	with Joke Silva & Joseph Benjamin
2010	Bursting Out	Zara Williams	with Majid Michel, Nse Ikpe-Etim, Omoni Oboli, & Desmond Elliot
2010	Mirror Boy	Teema	with Osita Iheme
2011	Sacred Lies	Isabella	with Olu Jacobs, Desmond Elliot, & Nadia Buari
2012	Weekend Getaway		with Ramsey Nouah, Ini Edo, Monalisa Chinda
2013	Half of a Yellow Sun	Ms. Adebayo	with Chiwetel Ejiofor, Thandie Newton, Onyeka Onwenu, and OC Ukeje
2013	Doctor Bello	Doctor Eniola	with Isaiah Washington, Vivica A. Fox, Justus Esiri, and Stephanie Okereke
2014	The Truth with Olisa	Guest	TV series
2015	Road to Yesterday	Victoria	with Oris Erhuero and Majid Michel
2018	Lionheart	Adaeze	Also the Director and Writer
2018	Farming	Tolu	Supporting Actress
2021	FELA! Ten-Twenty	Sewaa-Kuti Kalakuta Queen	With Ajala Aliu, Comfort Dangana, Adeola Adebari
2026	Wahala		With Cush Jumbo, Adelayo Adedayo, Deborah Ayorinde and Susan Wokoma

== Discography ==
- One Logologo Line (2004)

== See also ==
- List of Nigerian film producers
- List of Nigerian actresses
