= List of magazines in Nigeria =

There were 48 magazines in Nigeria in 2004 most of which were news magazines. Fashion magazines have also printed in the country, but these publications are relatively new. Glossy women's magazines were first published in the country in the 1990s. Nigeria witnessed the emergence of online magazines in the 2010s most which are literary magazines.

The following is an incomplete list of current and defunct magazines published in Nigeria.

== A ==
- A Nasty Boy
- African Film
- Akpata Magazine

== B ==
- BellaNaija
- Black Orpheus

== C ==
- City People Magazine

== E ==
- Encomium Magazine

== F ==
- Farafina Magazine

== G ==
- Genevieve Magazine
- Glendora Review
- Guardian Life Magazine

== H ==
- Hip Hop World Magazine

== I ==
- Isele Magazine

== L ==
- The Lagos Review

== N ==
- Naijaloaded
- The Native
- TheNEWS Magazine
- Newswatch
- NotJustOk

== O ==
- Omenana Magazine

== R ==
- Rolling Stone Africa

== S ==
- Saraba

== T ==
- Tell Magazine
- The Deen Magazine
- TooXclusive
- TurnTable

== Y ==
- Yes International!
- YNaija
