= Mustapha Enesi =

Nigerian story writer

- Education: University of Ilorin
- Occupation: Writer
- Writing career
- Genre: Fiction
- Notable work: I Cry at the Feet of My Other Body
- Website: mustaphaenesi.com

Mustapha Enesi is a Nigerian short story writer. His writing explores memory, displacement, the tensions between tradition and modernity, and family life. His writing is informed by queer studies, postcolonial thought, feminism, memory studies, narrative ethics, and an enduring interest in psychological interiority.

In 2021 he won the K & L Prize for African Literature for his short story "Kesandu," and in the same year he won the Awele Creative Trust Award for "Safety Pins Are Good Omens," which was published in Harvard University’s Transition Magazine His debut short story collection, I Cry at the Feet of My Other Body and Other Stories, exploring the lives of Nigerian women fighting the patriarchy, recognized in Open Country Magazine’s 60 Notable Books of 2025, was published by Witsprouts in September 2025 .

== Education ==
Enesi studied agricultural entomology at the University of Ilorin.

== Literary career ==
He was a finalist for the 2021 Alpine Fellowship Writing Prize and the 2021 Arthur Flowers Flash Fiction Prize. His works have appeared in Transition Magazine, Litro Magazine, The Republic, Isele Magazine, Peatsmoke Journal, The Maine Review and Love Grows Stronger in Death among others. He was a judge for the Oxford Flash Fiction Prize in 2023. He has served as an editor for Litro Magazine and The Republic and as a reader for Agbowo magazine.

His debut short story collection was published by Witpsrouts Books in September 2025. The collection is a complex exploration of womanhood, motherhood, grief, and societal pressures, featuring thirteen interconnected stories of Nigerian women striving for self-definition.
