= Only Big Bumbum Matters Tomorrow =

2024 novel by Damilare Kuku

- Author: Damilare Kuku
- Language: English
- Genre: Fiction
- Publisher: HarperVia (United States); Simon & Schuster (United Kingdom); Pan Macmillan (South Africa)
- Publication date: July 2024
- Publication place: Nigeria
- Pages: 272
- ISBN: 978-0-06-335449-4

Only Big Bumbum Matters Tomorrow is a 2024 debut novel by the Nigerian writer Damilare Kuku, following her 2021 short story collection Nearly All the Men in Lagos are Mad. It follows Témì Tóyèbí, a 20-year-old university graduate who announces that she wants a BBL.

It was published in July 2024 by HarperVia in North America, Simon & Schuster in the United Kingdom and Pan Macmillan in South Africa.

== Background and publication ==
Kuku has worked as a radio presenter, scriptwriter, film producer, actress and director. Her first book, the short story collection Nearly All the Men in Lagos are Mad, was published by Masobe Books and was the top-selling title on the Rovingheights bookstore's bestseller list for 2022, with 2,204 copies sold. In October 2023, HarperVia was announced as the publisher of her first novel, due in 2024.

Kuku has said the idea came from something that happened to a person she loves, who was bullied online for years, and that she wanted to write a "love letter" to her and to others who alter their bodies. She has said she effectively researched the subject for ten years by living in Nigeria. She drew on her childhood in Ile-Ife for the setting.

In a two-book deal, Simon & Schuster acquired UK and Commonwealth rights to the novel from Johnson & Alcock, while HarperVia acquired North American rights.

Kuku has said the title was partly inspired by the Black Lives Matter movement, with "tomorrow" standing for the future, and that it drew a heavy reaction on social media when it was announced. Afrocritik noted that the title is among several recent Nigerian book titles discussed as part of a trend towards attention-grabbing titles in the country's fiction.

The US and UK editions have different cover designs. The US cover has an all-pink background and a caricature of a woman with an enlarged backside, whereas the UK cover shows a woman holding her head high and appearing to dance. Kuku said she shaped the US design closely with her editors from the start, while for the UK cover she shared her vision and then let her agent and editor lead the artwork.

== Plot ==
Témì Tóyèbí is a 20-year-old recent graduate of Obafemi Awolowo University in Ile-Ife. She plans to enlarge her buttocks surgically, move to Lagos and find a partner. She announces the plan when her family is gathered after the death of her father, Professor Tito Toyebi. Her mother, older sister and aunts try to talk her out of it, and in doing so begin revealing secrets they have kept, including the truth about the disappearance of Témì's older sister, Ládùn, five years earlier. Ládùn left home years earlier and returns for their father's burial.

== Structure and style ==
The novel is told through several narrators. Témì's chapters are written in the second person; her mother Hassana, her sister Ládùn and her aunts narrate in the first person; and outsiders such as the family lawyer are rendered in the third person. The story is set largely in Ile-Ife and on the Obafemi Awolowo University campus. Chapters are devoted to individual characters, and some have inventive titles.

== Themes ==
Body image and body shaming are central themes, along with the effect of patriarchal expectations on women of different generations. The story combines the relationship between sisters, family secrets and cosmetic surgery. Témì's wish for surgery is presented as a response to years of being judged on her appearance, while the older women's own experiences show how their looks shaped their lives. The novel also touches on self-esteem, religion and the strained communication between women in the family, and on social media and beauty culture in Lagos.

== Reception ==
Shelf Awareness gave the novel a starred review, and Glamour South Africa rated it four out of five.

Terry Hong described it as insightful, funny and moving, while Olukorede Yishau described it as an easy, warm read that avoids moralising. Precious Omolu of Pulse Nigeria said the novel pairs comedy with a heavier question about why a woman's value remains tied to her body, and Lauren O'Connor-May writing for Plainsman found it moving and thought-provoking despite its comic title.

The shifts of narrative voice were praised as small but effective devices by Terry Hong. Evidence Egwuono Adjarho of Afrocritik praised the characterisation of Témì and the treatment of the relationships among the women, but found the multiple points of view overindulgent in the second half, citing jarring chapter shifts, similar-sounding voices and a reliance on exposition. It called these flaws forgivable.

Titilade Oyemade of BusinessDay said it was hard to choose a favourite among the characters and hoped for a sequel, though Oyemade found the protagonist's complaints excessive at times.
