= Masobe Books =

Nigerian publishing company

- Categories: literature, Art, culture, interviews
- Founder: Othuke Ominiabohs
- Founded: 2018
- Country: Nigeria
- Language: English
- Website: www.masobebooks.com

Masobe Books is an independent Nigerian publishing company. It was founded in 2018 by Nigerian author Othuke Ominiabohs and has since become one of the leading publishers of contemporary African writing on the continent.

Masobe is a word derived from the Isoko language of the Isoko people who hail from the Niger Delta region of Nigeria. It means 'Let Us Read'. The first book published under Masobe Books was Othuke Ominiabohs's debut novel, Odufa. Other imprints of Masobe Books include Makere and Oremaha

== Background ==
Masobe Books was founded in April 2018 by Nigerian author, Othuke Ominiabohs, citing a dream to support writers, significantly improve readership, and possibly revolutionize publishing in the Nigerian environment.

Masobe Books tackles the typical challenges in Nigerian literature, which include poor distribution and marketing; mediocre production, especially for self-published books; readers' apathy and skepticism; and writers' disillusionment with securing commensurate publication, reward, and exposure for their work.

Masobe Books is the publisher of Adaobi Tricia Nwaubani's debut novel, I Do Not Come To You By Chance, in Nigeria. The novel set in the world of Nigerian email scams, tells the story of a young man, Kingsley, who turns to his Uncle Boniface for help in bailing his family out of poverty.

Further notable authors published under Masobe Books includes Ukamaka Olisakwe, Abubakar Adam Ibrahim, T. J. Benson, Othuke Ominiabohs, Chimeka Garricks, and Michael Afenfia.

== Imprints ==
=== Masobe ===
This is the brands traditional publishing imprint for literary fiction, popular fiction and short-story collections. Masobe is a word derived from the Isoko Language of the Isoko people who hail from the Niger Delta region of Nigeria. It means 'Let Us Read'.

=== Makere ===
Makere is a subsidy or assisted-publishing imprint of Masobe Books and Logistics Limited which publishes work in all genres.

=== Oremaha ===
Oremaha is a traditional publishing imprint for children's books.

== Masobe book titles ==
- I Do Not Come To You By Chance and Buried Beneath the Baobab Tree by Adaobi Tricia Nwaubani (December, 2019);
- A Broken People's Playlist by Chimeka Garricks (June 8, 2020);
- The Mechanics of Yenagoa by Michael Afenfia (June 15, 2020);
- Ogadinma, or Everything Will Be All Right by Ukamaka Olisakwe (October 19, 2020);
- Dreams and Assorted Nightmares by Abubakar Adam Ibrahim (October 24, 2020);
- Odufa and Aviara by Othuke Ominiabohs (August 2020);
- The Madhouse by T. J. Benson (2021);
- The Days of Silence by Angel Patricks Amegbe (2021).
- Nearly All the Men in Lagos are Mad by Damilare Kuku (2021)
