= What Happened to Janet Uzor =

2022 Nigerian novel by Miracle Emeka-Nkwor

- Author: Miracle Emeka-Nkwor
- Language: English
- Genre: Young adult, mystery, thriller
- Publisher: Masobe Books
- Publication date: 2022
- Publication place: Nigeria
- Media type: Print

What Happened to Janet Uzor is a 2022 Nigerian young adult mystery novel by Miracle Emeka-Nkwor, published by Masobe Books. Set in Port Harcourt, the novel follows a group of secondary school students investigating the apparent drowning of their friend, Janet Uzor, whose death they suspect was not accidental.

== Plot ==
Janet Uzor, a student at Afobiri Secondary School in Port Harcourt, dies in an apparent drowning during the Christmas holidays. Although the police rule her death an accident, her best friend, Ebere, doubts the conclusion because Janet was an experienced swimmer.

A year later, another student, Pamela, begins receiving anonymous letters warning that she will be the next victim. Believing the threats are connected to Janet's death, Pamela joins Ebere, Dan and Eche in investigating the circumstances surrounding the incident. Their inquiries reveal that Janet had kept secrets from her friends and that her death is linked to a series of unexplained student deaths that had occurred during previous Christmas holidays.

The group concludes that the deaths were murders disguised as accidents and identifies a pattern connecting the victims. Their investigation leads them to the principal of Afobiri Secondary School, who is revealed to be responsible for Janet's murder and the earlier killings. Janet had discovered information that threatened to expose him, prompting him to stage her death as an accidental drowning. The principal's crimes are exposed, bringing the investigation to an end and revealing the truth behind Janet's death.

== Background and publication ==
What Happened to Janet Uzor is the debut novel by Nigerian writer Miracle Emeka-Nkwor, published by Masobe Books in 2022.

Emeka-Nkwor began writing the novel at the age of 15 while she was in secondary school. In an interview with Isele Magazine, she said the story was inspired by her interest in mystery fiction and plot twists after reading R. L. Stine's The Betrayal. She also said she wrote the novel in response to the limited visibility of African genre fiction, expressing the hope that it would encourage more writers and publishers to embrace genres such as mystery, fantasy and science fiction.

The novel employs multiple narrators, a technique Emeka-Nkwor said she chose to distinguish the characters' voices and experiences while exploring themes of friendship, adolescence and grief.

== Reception ==
Ayomide Ogunrinde of BusinessDay described the novel as a suspenseful mystery that sustains tension through its pacing and plot twists, praising its emotional portrayal of grief and friendship.

In The Lagos Review, Sylva Nze Ifedigbo wrote that the novel was a rare example of Nigerian young adult mystery fiction. He commended its atmospheric setting, characterisation and narrative momentum, but observed that some plot developments relied on coincidence and required a suspension of disbelief.

Annabelle Obie of Littafi praised its engaging mystery, accessible prose and relatable characters. However, she noted that certain scenes lacked realism and that some narrative threads could have been developed further.
