= Kiss and Tell (2011 film) =

- Theatrical release poster
- Directed by: Desmond Elliot
- Written by: Anthony Kehinde Joseph; Uduak Isong Oguamanam; Rita C. Onwurah
- Story by: Emem Isong
- Produced by: Emem Isong; Monalisa Chinda
- Starring: Monalisa Chinda; Joseph Benjamin; Desmond Elliot; Nse Ikpe Etim; Uche Jombo
- Cinematography: Austin Nwaolie
- Edited by: Uche Alexmoore; Alex Robbort; Kayode Adeniji
- Music by: Slam (composer); Uche Alexmoore (score)
- Production company: Royal Art Academy
- Distributed by: Royal Art Academy
- Release dates: 19 June 2011 (Lagos premiere); 18 July 2011 (Nigeria)
- Running time: 111 minutes
- Country: Nigeria
- Language: English

Kiss and Tell is a 2011 Nigerian romantic comedy film, produced by Emem Isong and directed by Desmond Elliot. It stars Monalisa Chinda, Joseph Benjamin, Desmond Elliot, Nse Ikpe Etim, Uche Jombo and Bhaira Mcwizu. Though the film was a commercial success, it was met with mixed to negative reception.

== Plot ==
Two friends and business partners, Iyke and Bernard, who are Casanovas, encounter Delphine, a divorce lawyer and a divorcee who has sworn off men. Bernard strikes a bet with Iyke, which involves Iyke having sex with Delphine in ten days or forfeit five percent of his shares to Bernard; if Iyke succeeds, he'd have five percent of Bernard's shares. However, Bernard tells Tena, Delphine's best friend, about the bet in order to have an edge, thereby complicating things for Iyke.

== Cast ==
- Monalisa Chinda as Delphine
- Joseph Benjamin as Iyke
- Nse Ikpe Etim as Tena
- Desmond Elliot as Bernard
- Uche Jombo as Mimi
- Bhaira Mcwizu as Eka
- Bobby Michaels as David
- Matthew H. Brown as Tunde
- Temisan Etsede as Lawyer

== Release ==
The film was initially intended for direct-to-video release, but the producer changed plans after production. A trailer was released on 16 May 2011. The film premiered on 19 June 2011 at the Silverbird Galleria, Victoria Island, Lagos, followed by a general theatrical release on 18 July 2011. It premiered overseas on 22 October 2011 at the Greenwich Odeon Cinema, London.

== Reception ==
=== Critical reception ===
The film was a box office success, but received mixed critical reviews. Nollywood Reinvented gave it a 23% rating, commended Nse Ikpe Etim's performance, but stated that the concept is not original. NollywoodForever.com gave a 74% rating, also highlighting Nse Ikpe Etim as the standout performance and concluded: "....although predictable, it was a nice feel good romantic well acted comedy, nothing great, but most definitely good". Kemi Filani commended performances from Joseph Benjamin and Nse Ikpe Etim, but also cited that the story is not original. Faith Ajayi gave 7 out of 10 stars and stated that the direction was great, but complained about the sound mixing.

=== Accolades ===
Kiss and Tell received six nominations at the 2012 Nollywood Movies Awards and Nse Ikpe Etim won the award for "Best Actress in a Supporting Role". It got two nominations at the 2013 Nigeria Entertainment Awards and Desmond Elliot won the award for the "Best Film Director. It also got three nominations at the 2012 Zulu African Film Academy Awards.

Complete list of Awards
Award	Category	Recipients and nominees	Result
Nollywood Movies Network (2012 Nollywood Movies Awards)	Best Movie	Desmond Elliot	Nominated
Nollywood Movies Network (2012 Nollywood Movies Awards)	Best Actor in a Leading Role	Joseph Benjamin	Nominated
Nollywood Movies Network (2012 Nollywood Movies Awards)	Best Actress in a Supporting Role	Nse Ikpe Etim	Won
Nollywood Movies Network (2012 Nollywood Movies Awards)	Best Directing	Desmond Elliot	Nominated
Nollywood Movies Network (2012 Nollywood Movies Awards)	Best Cinematography	Austin Nwaolie	Nominated
Nollywood Movies Network (2012 Nollywood Movies Awards)	Best Original Screenplay/Scriptwriting	Anthony Kehinde Joseph, Uduak Isong Oguamanam, Rita C. Onwurah	Nominated
Nigeria Entertainment Awards; 2013 Nigeria Entertainment Awards	Best Supporting Actress in a Film	Nse Ikpe Etim	Nominated
Nigeria Entertainment Awards; 2013 Nigeria Entertainment Awards	Best Film Director	Desmond Elliot	Won
2012 Zulu African Film Academy Awards	Best Lead Actor	Joseph Benjamin	Nominated
2012 Zulu African Film Academy Awards	Best Supporting Actress	Nse Ikpe Etim	Nominated
2012 Zulu African Film Academy Awards	Best Director	Desmond Elliot	Nominated
