= If I Am President =

2018 Nigerian political drama film

- Release poster
- Directed by: Bright Wonder Obasi
- Written by: Bright Wonder Obasi
- Produced by: Bright Wonder Obasi; Chinenye Obasi; Osas Iyamu; Nnadi Dumkenenna
- Starring: Ayolola Ayoola; Joke Silva; Bimbo Manuel; Bryan Okwara; Rahama Sadau; Rachel Bakam; Ayo Emmanuel; Ivie Okujaye; Osas Iyamu
- Cinematography: Ifeanyi Iloduba
- Edited by: Olamide Aremu
- Music by: Kulanen Ikyo
- Production company: High Definition Film Studios
- Release date: October 20, 2018 (Nigeria)
- Running time: 119 minutes
- Country: Nigeria
- Language: English

If I Am President is a 2018 Nigerian political drama film written and directed by Bright Wonder Obasi. It stars Ayoola Ayolola, Joke Silva, Rahama Sadau, Bimbo Manuel, Ivie Okujaye, Bryan Okwara, Ayo Emmanuel, Victor Decker, and Osas Iyamu.

A High Definition Film Studios production as supported by John D. and Catherine T. MacArthur Foundation, If I am President is a movie that brings to light the true political state of affairs of the Nigerian Government. It is centered around the story of 37-year old Zinachi Ohams, the presidential candidate of the Nigerian Rebirth Party, a new party made up of young idealists and recently metamorphosed from a Civil Society Organization.

== Cast ==
- Ayoola Ayolola as Zinachi Ohams
- Joke Silva as Rakia
- Bimbo Manuel as Elvis
- Bryan Okwara as Timi
- Rahama Sadau as Michelle Ohams
- Rachel Bakam as Show Host
- Ivie Okujaye as Umi
- Uzee Usman as Martins
- Rekiya Atta as Atinuke Williams
- Sydney Diala as Zinachi Oham's Father
- Olukayode Aiyegbusi as Senator Dimbo
- Osas Iyamu as Bovi
- Norman Doormor as Enenche
- Ayo Emmanuel as Man
- Ray Adeka as Bankole
- Adaora Onyechere as Genevieve (Presidential Debate Host)
- Victor Decker as Makata
- Chimdiya Nwigwe as Muna Ohams

== Production ==
If I Am President is a production of High Definition Film Studios with Bright Wonder Obasi, Osaretin Iyamu, and Nnadi Dumkennenna serving as producers. Written by Bright Wonder Obasi,the film explores the themes of the Nigerian political system, the struggle in political parties and power.

== Release ==
If I am President was scheduled for a World Premiere on Saturday, October 20, 2018, at the Transcorp Hilton Hotel in Abuja. It was released across cinemas in Nigeria on October 20, 2018.

== Awards and nominations ==
The movie won an award for Best Screenplay at the 2019 Motion Pictures International Film Festival, Oklahoma City, Oklahoma United States.
