= Road to Yesterday (film) =

2015 film by Ishaya Bako

Road To Yesterday
- Theatrical release poster
- Directed by: Ishaya Bako
- Screenplay by: Emil B. Garuba; Ishaya Bako
- Story by: Genevieve Nnaji
- Produced by: Chichi Nwoko; Chinny Onwugbenu; Genevieve Nnaji
- Starring: Genevieve Nnaji; Oris Erhuero
- Cinematography: Idowu Adedapo
- Edited by: Chuka Ejorh
- Music by: Kulanen Ikyo
- Production company: The Entertainment Network (TEN)
- Distributed by: FilmOne Distribution
- Release date: 27 November 2015
- Running time: 91 minutes
- Country: Nigeria
- Language: English
- Budget: ₦30 million
- Box office: ₦30,000,700

Road To Yesterday is a 2015 Nigerian road romantic drama film directed by Ishaya Bako. It stars Genevieve Nnaji and Oris Erhuero in lead roles, with Majid Michel and Chioma 'Chigul' Omeruah in supporting roles. The film, which is co-produced by Genevieve Nnaji, is the actress' first effort as a producer.

Road to Yesterday tells the story of an estranged married couple, hoping to mend their strained marriage whilst on a road trip to a relative’s funeral.

== Cast ==
- Genevieve Nnaji as Victoria
- Oris Erhuero as Izu
- Chioma Omeruah as Onome
- Baaj Adebule as Concierge
- Lilian Afegbai as Receptionist
- Joel Benson as Photographer
- Ify Brown as Restaurant Waiter
- Ayo Falana as Policeman
- Lord Frank as Frank
- Ieoma Ibeawuchi as Baby Abigail
- Nancy Isime as Kike
- Nkem Marchie as Izu's Mistress
- Majid Michel as John
- Bolanle Ninalowo as Tosin
- Frances Okeke as Anna
- Ebele Okaro-Onyiuke as Victoria's mum

== Production ==
Road To Yesterday was majorly shot in Lagos State. Principal photography commenced in February 2015. It was produced with the support of Africa Magic. Road To Yesterday is Nnaji's first film as a producer, and it is also Ishaya Bako's first feature film. The film was shot on an estimated budget of ₦30 million.

== Promotions ==
The official website for the film was launched on 30 September 2015. On 2 October 2015, Genevieve Nnaji, along with the director, Ishaya Bako, made radio rounds on Beat FM, Naija FM and Classic FM, to promote the movie. It also had a media screening on 27 October 2015 at the Genesis Deluxe Cinema, Lekki. The lead actors of the film, Nnaji and Erhuero, covered the November edition of Vanguard Allure Magazine.

== Release ==
Teaser trailers for Road To Yesterday was released online on 29 September 2015; One of the trailers is a narration through the eyes of the lead female character, Victoria, while the other trailer is a narration from Izu's perspective. Official trailer for the film was released online on 27 October 2015. The film was scheduled to be premiered on 18 November 2015, but instead had its world premiere at the 2015 Africa International Film Festival on 13 November 2015. It was released across Nigerian cinemas on 27 November 2015, after a premiere at Silverbird cinema, Abuja on 25 November.
