= 4th Republic =

2019 Nigerian political drama film

- Release poster
- Directed by: Ishaya Bako
- Screenplay by: Ishaya Bako; Emil B. Garuba
- Produced by: Ishaya Bako; Bem Pever
- Starring: Kate Henshaw; Enyinna Nwigwe; Sani Muazu; Linda Ejiofor; Bimbo Manuel; Yakubu Muhammed; Sifon Oko; Preach Bassey
- Cinematography: John Njaga Demps
- Edited by: Shittu Taiwo
- Music by: Kulanen Ikyo
- Production companies: Amateur Heads; Griot Studios
- Distributed by: FilmOne Production
- Release date: 12 April 2019 (Nigeria)
- Running time: 1 hr 59 min
- Country: Nigeria
- Language: English
- Box office: $21,319

4th Republic is a 2019 Nigerian political drama film directed by Ishaya Bako and written by Ishaya Bako, Emil Garuba and Zainab Omaki. It stars Kate Henshaw-Nuttal, Enyinna Nwigwe, Sani Muazu, Ihuoma Linda Ejiofor, Bimbo Manuel, Yakubu Muhammed, Sifon Oko, Jide Attah, and Preach Bassey. Produced by Amateur Heads and Griot Studios, 4th Republic was funded by grants from the John D. and Catherine T. MacArthur Foundation and the Open Society Initiative for West Africa (OSIWA) centered around a governorship aspirant, Mabel King (Kate Henshaw) in the aftermath of a violent and fraudulent election that results in the death of her campaign manager, Sikiru (Jide Attah). The film was screened in seven universities in Nigeria in collaboration with the Independent National Electoral Commission (INEC) and Enough is Enough (EiE Nigeria) to curb electoral violence. It was also endorsed by the National Orientation Agency (NOA).

The film made its debut on Netflix on 13 June 2020.

== Cast ==
- Kate Henshaw-Nuttal as Mabel King
- Enyinna Nwigwe as Ike
- Sani Muazu as Governor Idris Sanni
- Linda Ejiofor as Bukky Ajala
- Bimbo Manuel as St. James
- Yakubu Muhammed as Danladi
- Sifon Oko as Lucky Ameh
- Saratu Ibrahim as Amina
- Bassey Ekpo as Amina's father
- Fatima Salihu as Amina's mother
- Rekiya Ibrahim Attah as Justice Ekanem
- Emilia Oge Nwamadi as Mrs. Ameh
- Alfred Atungu as Shuaibu
- Enyinna Nwigwe as Ike
- Dubaggari Umar as Bukky's brother
- Momoh Pius Oshogwemoh as radio presenter
- Amaka Obiwulu as Yinka
- Sifon Kalistus Okoi as Lucky

== Production ==
4th Republic is a joint production between Amateur Heads and Griot Studios Ltd with Bem Pever, Ishaya Bako, Kemi ‘Lala’ Akindoju, and Ummi A. Yakubu serving as producers. It was written by Ishaya Bako, Emil Garuba and Zainab Omaki. The film explores the theme of the Nigerian political system that chronicles the political and electoral system in the last two decades.

== Release ==
4th Republic premiered at the IMAX, Filmhouse Cinemas in Lekki, Nigeria on 7 April 2019. It was released across cinemas in Nigeria on 9 April, guests who attended the premiere include Sola Sobowale, Tope Oshin, Kehinde Bankole, Chigul, Waje, Lilian Afegbai, Denrele Edun, Japheth Omojuwa and Linda Osifo, among others.
