= Rolling Stone Africa =

African edition of Rolling Stone

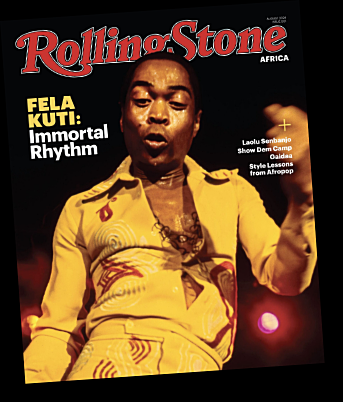
- The cover of the 1st edition of Rolling Stone Africa, August, 2024
- Editor-in-Chief: Gwen Madiba
- Categories: Music
- First issue: August 2024
- Company: Mwankom Group
- Country: Nigeria
- Based in: Lagos
- Language: English, French
- Website: rollingstoneafrica.com

Rolling Stone Africa is the African edition of the United States' Rolling Stone magazine devoted to music, politics, and popular culture, published monthly.

== History ==
Rolling Stone Africa was launched in August 2024, announced by Gus Wenner (CEO of Rolling Stone) as a joint venture with the Mwankom Group to "expand its presence in Africa". Rolling Stone Africa is operated under licence by the Mwankom Group, the group was founded by David Romuald "DR" Bellegarde-Smeralda. The magazine was launched in August 2024 with two covers, one featuring Fela Kuti and another featuring the work of Laolu Senbanjo. Published quarterly the magazine features articles from editors across various African countries and is distributed in Nigeria, South Africa, Ghana, and Zimbabwe. A South African edition of Rolling Stone was previously published from 2011 to 2014.

Gwen Madiba was appointed as the first editor-in-chief in June 2025, Madiba had previously received the Order of Ottawa and a King Charles III Coronation Medal for her contributions to equity and representation in the world of journalism.

Since June 2025 the magazine became available in French as Rolling Stone Afrique.

== Covers ==
As an introduction to the launch of the magazine in Africa, the 1st edition of the magazine was published with two covers, one published on 1 August 2024, and crafted by Rolling Stone Africa's contributor, Nicole Asinugo, featuring the visual artist Laolu Senbanjo, and another published on 2 August 2024, crafted by Lemi Ghariokwu featuring the musician Fela Kuti. In January 2025, Portuguese professional footballer and left winger, Rafael Leão was featured as the cover of Rolling Stone Africa. In February, Uncle Waffles became the first female artist to be on the cover of Rolling Stone Africa. In March, Nigerian-American singer and songwriter, Davido was featured as the fifth cover of Rolling Stone Africa. The first six issues featured, in order of appearance:

1. Fela Kuti
2. Laolu Senbanjo
3. Rafael Leão
4. Uncle Waffles
5. Davido
6. Ciara and Ari Lennox

== Notable contributors ==
- Nicole Asinugo
- Tim Dickinson
- Alan Sepinwall
- Lemi Ghariokwu
- Andrew Dosunmu

== See also ==
- Rolling Stone
- List of magazines in Nigeria
