= Occupy Nigeria =

Protest in Nigeria

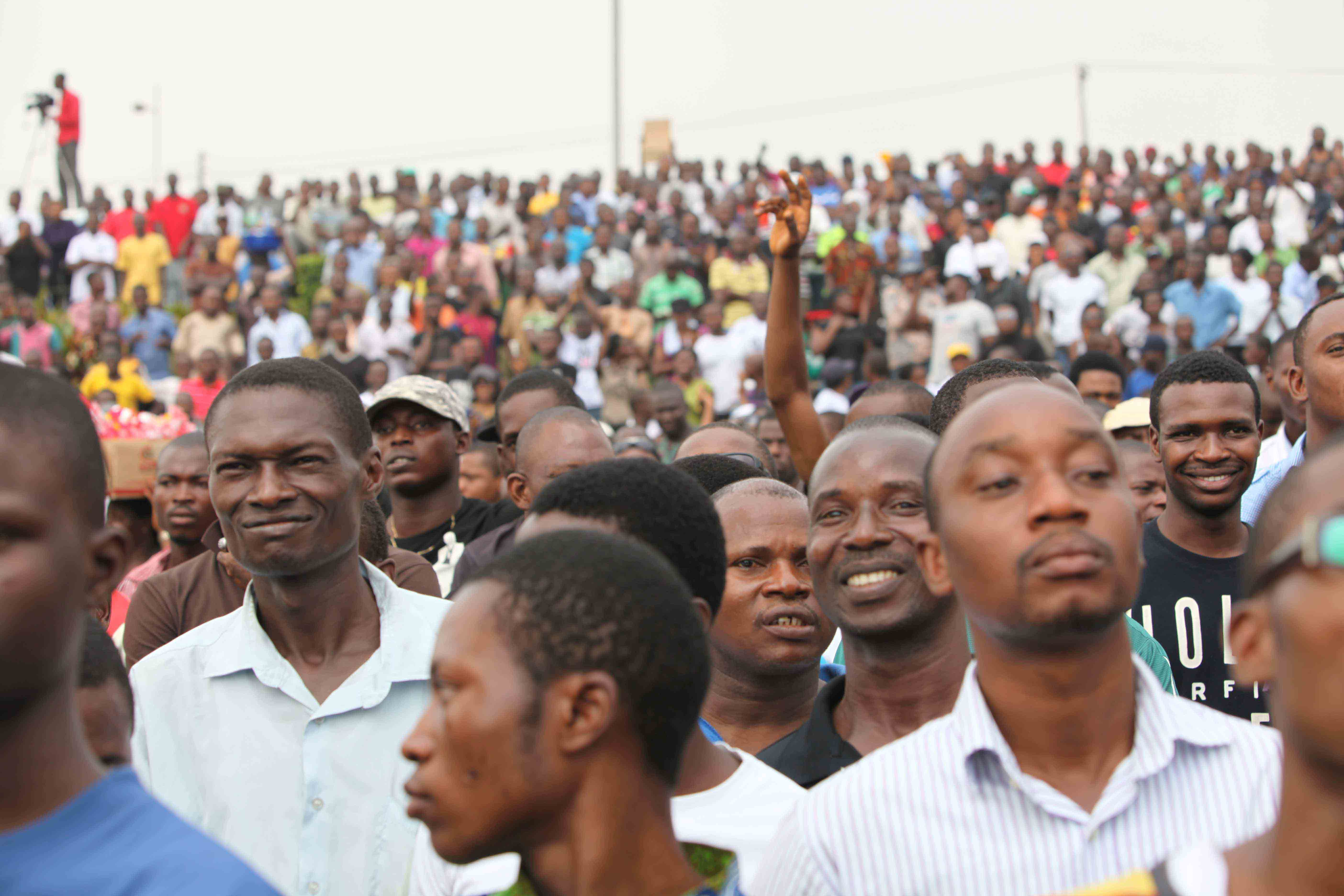
- Protesters at Ojota, Lagos
- Date: 2 January 2012 – 14 January 2012 (1 week and 5 days)
- Location: Nigeria and Nigerian diaspora
- Caused by: Removal of subsidy on Petroleum products; 120% increase in the price of Petrol; corruption in Government & public service; Inhuman treatment of Nigerians by Government & Security agents; High rate of poverty
- Goals: Reversing the Removal of subsidy on petroleum products; Federal Government budget review (Cut-backs on politician allowances); Reduction of Corruption in the Federal Government and NNPC Limited
- Methods: Civil disobedience; Civil resistance; Strike actions; Demonstrations; Online activism

Casualties
- Deaths: 16 (Lagos, Maiduguri, Ilorin and Gusau; All shot by the Nigeria Police Force)

The location of Nigeria, on the African continent

Occupy Nigeria was a socio-political protest movement that began in Nigeria on Monday, 2 January 2012 in response to the fuel subsidy removal by the Federal Government of President Goodluck Jonathan on Sunday, 1 January 2012. Protests took place across the country, including in the cities of Kano, Surulere, Ojota ( -part of metropolitan Lagos ), Abuja, Minna, and at the Nigerian High Commission in London. The protests have been characterised by civil disobedience, civil resistance, strike actions, demonstrations and online activism. The use of social media services such as Twitter and Facebook was a prominent feature of the protests.

== Background ==
Nigeria is Africa's largest oil producer, but still imports refined petrol. The country produces about 2.4 million barrels of crude oil daily which is exported to be refined abroad; however due to years of corruption-fueled neglect the domestic refineries are inoperative. As a consequence, Nigeria imports 70% of its gasoline (about 250,000bpd of petroleum products) into the country for sale to its citizens. The price of petrol has increased from 65 naira ($0.40; £0.26) per litre to at least 141 naira in filling stations and from 100 naira to at least 200 naira on the black market, from which many Nigerians buy their fuel.

With the majority of Nigerians living on less than $2 per day, cheap petrol is viewed by many Nigerians as the only tangible benefit they receive from the state, hence the widespread disapproval. In addition, the economy is heavily reliant on crude oil (amongst other reasons, due to absence of essential infrastructure and services such as constant electricity). A consequence of this is that other seemingly unrelated items are tied to the price of fuel as has occurred from previous price hikes. Due to the absence of stable electricity, gasoline generators are a common energy alternative for small businesses and residences.

The removal of the subsidy took effect from Sunday, 1 January 2012 as announced by the Executive Secretary of the Petroleum Product Pricing Regulatory Agency, PPPRA Reginald Stanley.

== Protests ==
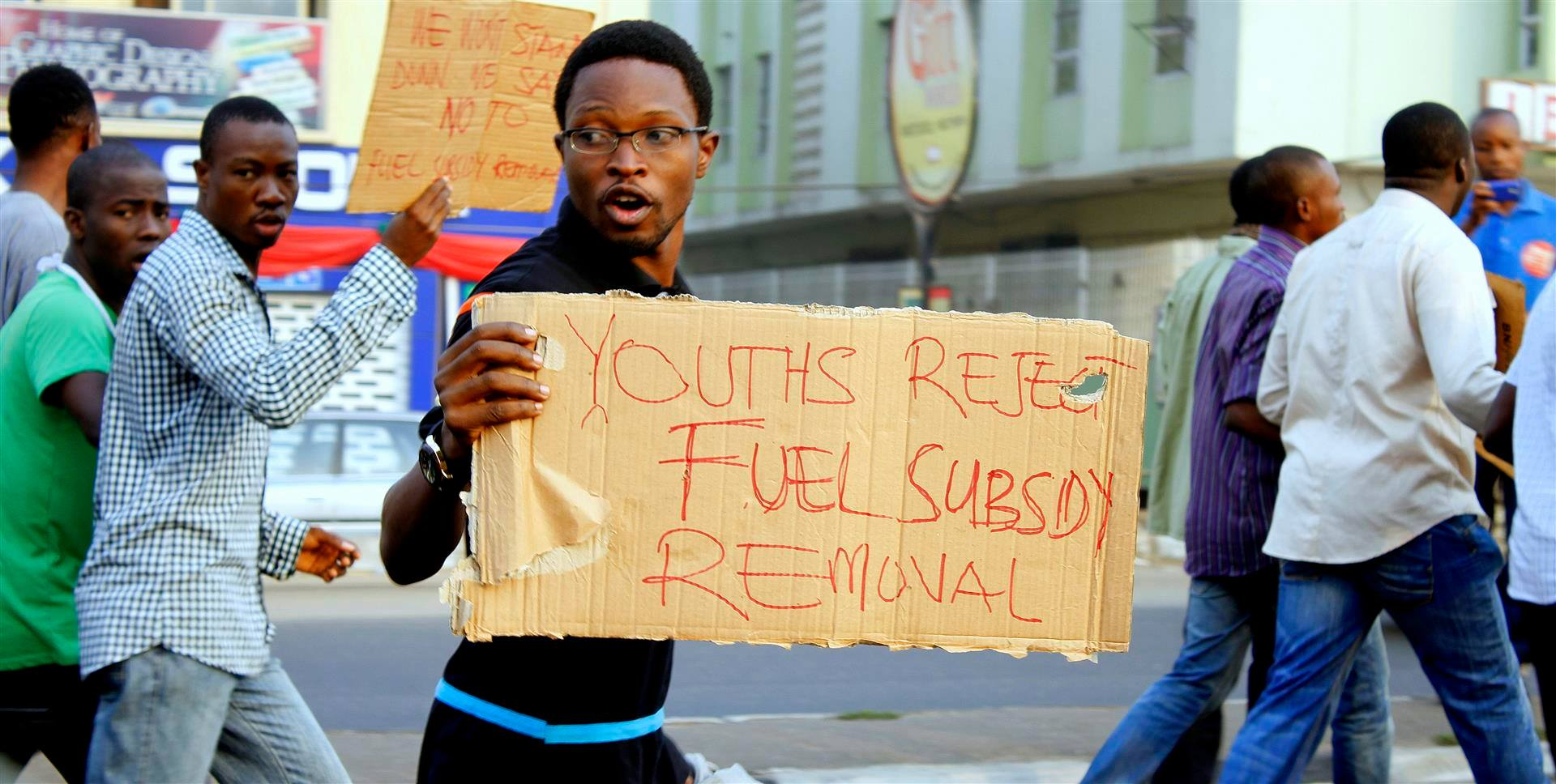

Protesters shut petrol stations and formed human barriers along motorways. Nigeria's main trade unions have also announced an indefinite strike and mass demonstrations from Monday, 9 January 2012 unless the removal of a fuel subsidy is reversed. "We have the total backing of all Nigerian workers on this strike and mass protest," the Nigeria Labour Congress's Chris Uyot told the BBC. Governor of the Central Bank of Nigeria Lamido Sanusi told the BBC the subsidy (which he said cost the government about $8bn last year) was "unsustainable". Several previous governments have tried to remove the subsidy but have backed down in the face of widespread public protests and reduced it instead.

== Casualties ==
Muyideen Mustapha, 23, was reportedly the first person to be killed during the nationwide protests over the lifting of petrol subsidies. He was reportedly shot by the Nigerian Police Force in Ilorin, Kwara State on 3 January 2012. The Police denied the report saying that he had been stabbed by other protestors for not joining in the protest. Muyideen was buried on Wednesday 4 January 2012, according to Islamic rites.

There have been further reports of one to three people being killed by clashes between police and protesters on 9 January.

On 9 January, a Divisional Police Officer attached to the Lagos State Command, shot and killed a young man, Ademola Aderinde at Ogba during the protests in Lagos. The officer was arrested on the order of the Commissioner of Police and was expected to be charged with murder following an investigation.

== Abuja and London protests ==
The Occupy Nigeria Movement planned another protest at Eagle Square, Abuja on Friday, 6 January 2012 while another one held simultaneously at the Nigerian Embassy in London. However, leaks from security agencies report of an order issued by the Government of Nigeria to the Mobile Police, advising them that the best way to stop the protests was to kill at least one of the protesters. Although such rumours are typical in a country like Nigeria where political opponents are known to hijack such protests in a bid to tarnish the public image of incumbent government.

== Minna riot ==
On the third day of the protests, a crowd of youths went on the rampage, setting fire to buildings and cars in the Niger State capital. Hundreds of rioters set fire to government and political party offices and also targeted the homes of local politicians. An office building belonging to former Nigerian President Ibrahim Babangida was among those attacked. One policeman was killed in Minna when an electoral commission building was attacked.

== International protests ==
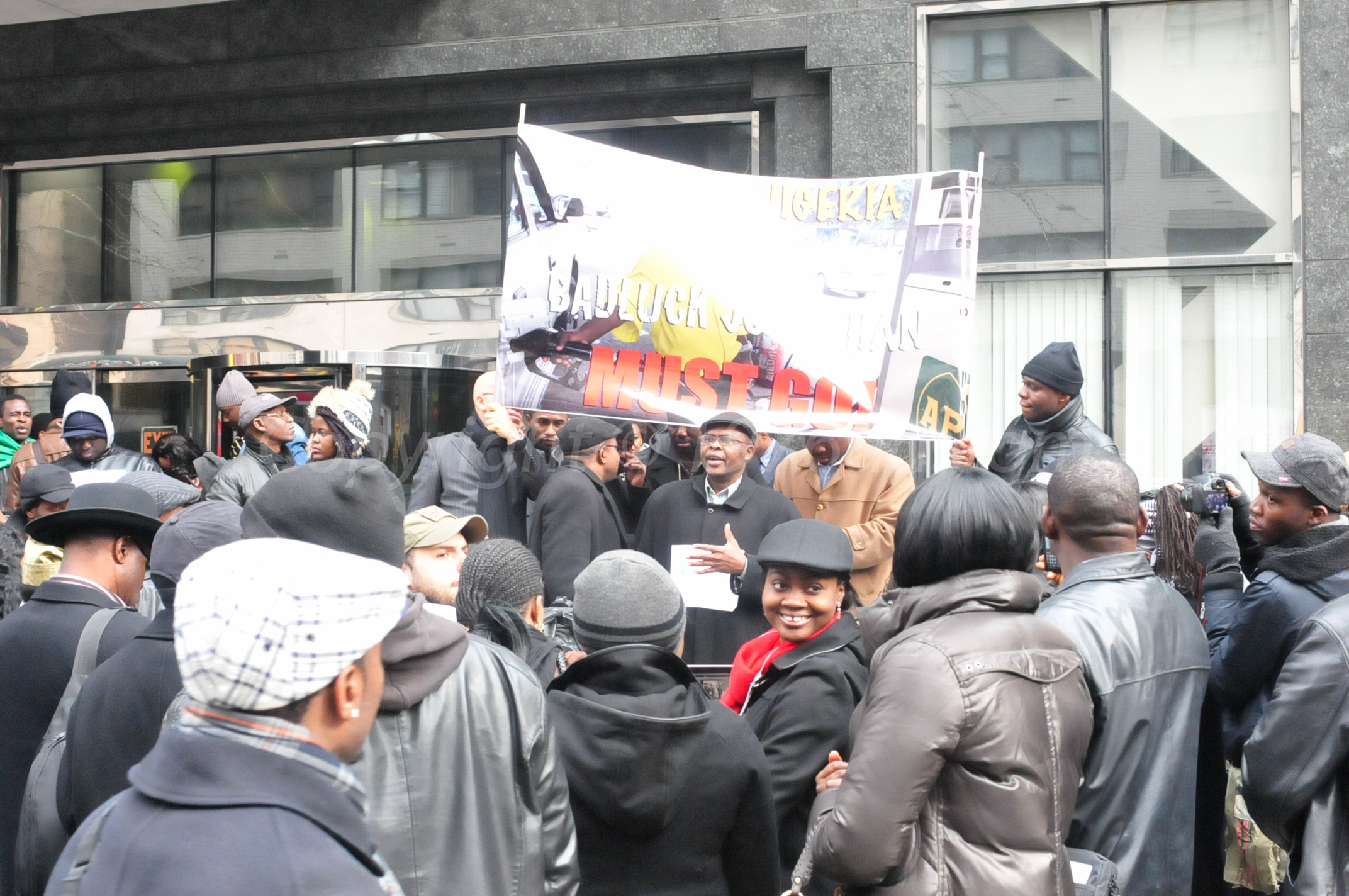
Occupy Nigeria protesters in New York City

The Occupy Nigeria protests have also occurred in other countries to show solidarity with what the plight of Nigerians back home. The first one was held at the Nigerian High Commission in London on 6 January 2012, followed by another at the World bank complex in Washington D.C., on 9 January. 2012. Other countries like Belgium (-in Brussels its capital), and South Africa joined the protests and occupied the Nigerian embassy in their countries in the second week of January 2012.

== NLC/TUC ==
On Thursday, 5 January 2012, the Nigeria Labour Congress issued an ultimatum to the Federal Government promising to halt the economy of the country by Monday, 9 January 2012.

"We are shutting down the Nigerian airspace to local and international flights from Sunday night" said Denja Yakub of NLC.

"If a revolution will solve our problems, why not, what is going on already shows that our people are prepared for a revolution. But we will not ask for a revolution that will bring back the military, they are a part of the problem." he added

== Government reaction ==
Following the emergency meeting of the Federal Executive Council, in Abuja, the Minister of Information, Mr. Labaran Maku, told newsmen the government was not oblivious of the pains inflicted by Nigerians as a result of the new policy. In order to ameliorate those pains, he said the government had commenced a 'massive mass transit scheme' aimed at cushioning the effects of the subsidy removal on transportation. 1600 diesel-powered mass transit vehicles, he claimed, would be distributed.

Curiously missing at the pivotal meeting were two controversial senior officials and pillars of the new policy: Finance Minister, Ngozi Okonjo-Iweala, and Petroleum Resources Minister, Diezani Alison-Madueke. Ngozi Okonjo-Iweala is quoted as having said that she'll resign if the presidency goes back on its decision to remove the subsidy.

== Media ==
Channels Television and Galaxy Television, two local mediahouses in Lagos, covered the Lagos protests on 3 January 2012. There was also a report on the march in the Daily Times of Nigeria.

In addition, Facebook group pages were created to spur Nigerians globally against the fuel-subsidy removal regime. One of them (called "Nationwide Anti-Fuel Subsidy Removal: Strategies & Protests") created by Gimba Kakanda, Richard Ali and Jeff Unaegbu, on 2 January 2012, had over 20,000 members by 9 January 2012. Student websites in universities and blogs were reporting the Occupy Nigeria Protests and student representatives were sending live pictures of ongoing protests.

Twitter was also used as a connecting platform for the protesters.

The 2012 documentary Fuelling Poverty by Ishaya Bako was based on some of the events that occurred during the fuel subsidy crisis. It was banned by the Federal government of Nigeria for being "highly provocative and likely to incite or encourage public disorder and undermine national security.". It went on to win category Best Documentary at the 2013 Africa Movie Academy Awards, and was praised by many Human Right activists and organisations.

== See also ==
- List of fuel protests
- Arab Spring
- Civil resistance
- List of Occupy movement protest locations
- Occupy Movement
- Occupy Wall Street
- End Sars
- 2011 Nigerian election uprising
- 2018-2019 Japanese protests
