= Leave My Bones in Saskatoon =

2023 novel by Michael Afenfia

- Book cover
- Author: Michael Afenfia
- Language: English; Pidgin English
- Set in: Abuja; Makurdi; Saskatoon
- Published: 2023
- Publisher: Griots Lounge Canada
- Pages: 304
- ISBN: 978-1-77768-847-9

Leave My Bones in Saskatoon is a 2023 fiction novel written by Michael Afenfia and published by Griots Lounge Canada. The novel follows a man Nigerian who migrates to Canada with her daughter and challenges they faced there as immigrants.

== Background and development ==
Michael Afenfia, a Nigerian-Canadian lawyer and writer who currently lives in Saskatoon wanted to highlight the experience of an immigrant especially Nigerians and wrote the novel as a way to talk the Nigerian government to combat the Japa syndrome.

Written over a course of one year and published by Griot Lounge Canada, it is Afenfia's sixth novel succeeding Rain Can Never Know.

== Plot summary ==
The novel written in two parts follows Owoicho, a television presenter and his wife Ene, who is an aide to a governor and their four children as they try to migrate to Saskatoon in Saskatchewan, Canada.

Ene with three of her four children go to pay a visit to her parents in Makurdi, Benue State but are killed by armed bandit on their way back. On that same day, Owoicho receives the stamped visa for his entire family from the Canadian embassy in Abuja but is disheartened with the news of the tragedy.

After the funeral, he moves to Canada with his only surviving daughter Ochanya and is rented a basement in the house of the friend of her late wife. Owoicho tries menial jobs but doesn't stay long due to being sacked or frustration. He then agrees to come back to Nigeria and work in a state-owned radio house. A fight breaks out and Owoicho moves away from the basement and rejects the offer to come to Nigeria due to the fear of the uncertainty.

== Reception ==
Olukorede Yishau writing for Isele Magazine praising the novel noting that it is "rich with suspense and twists." Zeahaa Rehman writing in Quill and Quire praised the novel noting how it introduces the reader to the Nigerian culture.
