= Chinny Onwugbenu =

Nigerian film producer

- Known for: Film Producer
- Notable work: Road to Yesterday; Lionheart

Chinny Onwugbenu // is a Nigerian film producer notable for co-producing Road to Yesterday and producing Lionheart. She is the co-founder of The Entertainment Network (TEN), a film production company in Nigeria.

== Education ==
Chinny attended the Pennsylvania State University and graduated with a degree in Economics in 2006. In 2010, she had her MBA from the UCLA Anderson School of Management.

== Career ==
In 2015, Chinny co-produced Road to Yesterday, and produced the Netflix-acquired Lionheart in 2018. She is also the co-founder of the Entertainment Network (TEN) alongside Genevieve Nnaji, a film production company in Nigeria.

== Awards and recognition ==
- Best Movie (West Africa) at 2016 AMVCA - Road to Yesterday (film)
