= 2012 Nollywood Movies Awards =

1st Nollywood Movies Awards
- Date: 2 June 2012
- Hosted by: Julius Agwu, Kate Henshaw
- Organized by: Nollywood Movies Network

Highlights
- Best Picture: Tango with Me

The maiden edition of the Nollywood Movies Awards was held at the Civic Center in Lagos Nigeria on 2 June 2012 to reward excellence of film professionals in Nollywood. Tango with Me and Mirror Boy won the most awards. Genevieve Nnaji and Ramsey Nouah won the viewer's choice awards for the female and male categories respectively by popular vote.

== Winners ==
=== Awards ===
Winners are written first and are emboldened.

Best Movie	Best Actor in a Leading Role
Tango with Me; Anchor Baby; Private Storm; Memories of the Heart; Kiss and Tell; Mirror Boy	Joseph Benjamin (Tango with Me); Van Vicker (Against the Law); Ramsey Nouah (Private Storm); Trybson Dudukoko (Ghetto Dreamz); Joseph Benjamin (Kiss and Tell); Charles Okafor (Fake Prophet)
Best Actor in a Supporting Role	Best Actress in a Leading Role
Gabriel Afolayan (Ghetto Dreamz); Junior Pope Odonwodo (Nkwocha); John Dumelo (Private Storm); Yul Edochie (Against the Law)	Mercy Johnson (Weeping Soul); Genevieve Nnaji (Tango with Me); Uche Jombo (Damage); Omotola Jalade Ekeinde (Private Storm)
Best Actress in a Supporting Role	Best Actor in an Indigenous Movie (Non-English speaking language)
Nse Ikpe Etim (Kiss and Tell); Tina Mba (Tango with Me); Rachael Oniga (Ghetto Dreamz); Stella Damasus Aboderin (Bent Arrows)	Chiwetalu Agu (Nkwocha); Yinka Quadri (Aye Dudu); Saidi Balogun (Eti Keta); Brown Igboegwu (Apparition); Femi Adebayo (Emi Abata); Odunlade Adekola (Ikuforiji)
Best Actress in an Indigenous Movie (non-English speaking language)	Best Indigenous Language Movie (non-English speaking language)
Funke Akindele (Emi Abata); Funke Akindele (The Return of Jenifa); Queen Nwokoye (Nkwocha); Mercy Aigbe (Oladunjoye); Dupe Adejare (Alantaku)	Aye Dudu; Eti Keta; Ikuforiji; Nkwocha; Apparition; Oladunjoye
Best Directing	Best Cinematography
Mahmood Ali-Balogun (Tango with Me); Obi Emelonye (Mirror Boy); Daniel Ademinokan (Ghetto Dreamz); Lancelot Oduwa-Imasuen (Private Storm); Desmond Elliot (Kiss and Tell)	Tango with Me; Private Storm; Changing Faces; Anchor Baby; Mirror Boy; Kiss and Tell
Best Movie Editing	Best Movie soundtrack
The Mirror Boy; Anchor Baby; Ghetto Dreamz; Return of Jenifa; Changing Faces; Memories of the Heart	Ghetto Dreamz; Bent Arrows; Mirror Boy; Changing Faces; Memories of the Heart; Tango with Me
Best Sound Editing/Design	Best Original Screenplay/Scriptwriting
Tango with Me; Private Storm; Apparition; Anchor Baby; Mirror Boy; Ghetto Dreamz	Lonzo Nzekwe (Anchor Baby); Obi Emelonye (Mirror Boy); Ugezu J Ugezu (Against Law); Daniel Ademinokan & Ope Banwo (Ghetto Dreamz); Uduak Isong Oguamanam (Kiss and Tell); Lonzo Nzekwe (Anchor Baby); Chinwe Sele (Soul after Soul)
Best Costume Design	Best Makeup
The Mirror Boy; Ghetto Dreamz; Tango with Me; Apparition; Entrapped	Mirror Boy (Gabriel Okorie); Ghetto Dreamz; Tango with Me; Apparition; Damage
Rising Star Award	Viewers Choice Awards
Sylvia Oluchi (Bent Arrows); Halima Abubakar (Entrapped); Helen Paul (The Return of Jenifa); Nuella Njubigbo (Apparition); Gabriel Afolayan (Ghetto Dreamz); Chinyere Madubuike Kosi (Apparition)	Ramsey Nouah; Genevieve Nnaji
Lifetime Achievement Award: Kenneth Nnebue
