= Nollywood Movies Awards =

Nigerian film award

- Awarded for: Excellence in Nigeria film Industry
- Country: Nigeria
- Presented by: Nollywood Movies Network
- First award: 2012
- Final award: 2014
- Website: http://www.nollywoodmoviesawards.tv/

The Nolly Awards, formerly the Nollywood Movies Awards, is a former Nigerian film award presented by the Nollywood Movies TV to honour outstanding achievement in the Nigerian film industry.

The inaugural edition was held at the Civic Center, Lagos on 2 June 2012. The most recent ceremony was held on 18 October 2014 at the newly commissioned Intercontinental Hotel, which is the tallest hotel in West Africa.

In 2016, the awards was rebranded to The Nolly Awards, with the 2016 edition to hold on May 1, however, the ceremony didn't hold for the second year in a row.

== Ceremonies ==
- 2012 Nollywood Movies Awards
- 2013 Nollywood Movies Awards
- 2014 Nollywood Movies Awards

== Categories ==
As of 2013, the Nollywood Movie Awards has 27 categories.

- Best Movie
- Best Actress in a Leading Role
- Best Actor in a Leading Role
- Best Actress in a Supporting Role
- Best Actor in a Supporting Role
- Best Diaspora Movie
- Best Film in an Indigenous Nigerian Language
- Best Lead Actor in an Indigenous Language
- Best Lead Actress in an Indigenous Language
- Best Editing
- Best Sound Design
- Best Original Screenplay
- Best Cinematography
- Best Director
- Best Make-up Design
- Best Costume Design
- Best Set Design
- Best Music Soundtrack
- Best Rising Star (Male)
- Best Rising Star (Female)
- Best Child Actor
- Best Short Movie

=== Special Recognition Awards ===
- Goodluck Jonathan Lifetime Achievement
- Popular Online Choice (male)
- Popular Online Choice (female)
- Top Box Office Movie (Nigeria)
- Industry Patron Award
- The Humanitarian Award
