= Rachel Bakam =

Nigerian actress (1982–2021)

- Born: 11 September 1982; Kaduna, Nigeria
- Died: 13 April 2021 (aged 38)
- Education: Ahmadu Bello University
- Occupations: TV producer & presenter, director, actress, media consultant, sports administrator, Christian counsellor
- Years active: 2000–2021
- Known for: Philanthropy, tourism, fashion, anti-human trafficking advocacy, peace building, sports
- Notable work: Trends & Rachel, Stylecode, Rachel the Piper, Yanayin Zamani
- Website: pipersdynasty.com

Rachel Bakam (11 September 1982 – 13 April 2021) was a Nigerian actress, writer, TV presenter and producer, and an anti-human trafficking ambassador. She was the CEO and managing director of Rayzeds Media Ltd, Founder and president of the Nigerian Water Ski And Wakeboard Federation (NWWF) and media consultant for the Performing Musician Employers Association (PMAN) & African Fashion Reception Paris. Bakam was a peace and tourist ambassador. She was 2015 alumna of United States International Visitors Leadership Programme. She hosted Trends & Rachel, a popular television show that airs on Nigerian Television Authority (NTA), African Independent Television (AIT), DSTV, and Startimes. She also produced and presented Rachel the PIPER and hausa version RACHEL MAI KAKAAKI; an entertaining yet highly humanitarian television programme. Bakam died on Tuesday 13 April 2021 due to complications of anaemia. Audu Maikori lead tribute for her.

== Early life and education ==
Bakam was born and brought up in Kaduna State by Mr. and Mrs. Adams and Rose Bakam where she had her primary, secondary, and tertiary education. She is Bajju by tribe from Zonkwa in Zangon Kataf local government area of Kaduna State, Northern Nigeria. She studied English and theatre arts at Ahmadu Bello University and digital filmmaking at New York Film Academy. She lost her father at the age of 12. At the age of 16 she started working, first as a salesgirl in a supermarket, then later in a recording studio and played a lead role in Hausa drama series known as Rayuwa. She was president of the Literary and Debating Club then Head Girl in Kaduna Capital School, best graduating female student and best graduating student of the faculty of arts at Ahmadu Bello University Zaria.

== Career ==
She did her National Youth Service Corps at Nigerian Television Authority International, where she produced and presented different TV programmes like Trends, Saturday Morning, and Style Code. She proceeded to study digital filmmaking at New York Film Academy and thereafter established Rayzed Media Ltd. Bakam brought water skiing and wakeboarding to Nigeria. In 2016, she got an endorsement deal with Numatville Megacity. She has joined non-government organizations, such as Devatop Centre for Africa Development in campaigning against sex trafficking and other forms of modern slavery in Nigeria.

She was a media consultant for the African Fashion Reception Paris.

== Awards and nominations ==
Bakam received several awards and nominations for her work, some of which include:

- 2015 Pan African Humanitarian Award as the Most Promising TV Personality of the Year
- Sir Tafela Balewa Leadership Award as the Media Entrepreneur of the year
- 2016 United Nations World Habitat Humanitarian Award
- Nigerian Dream Personality Honors
- 2016 Ambassador of Peace Award
- 2015 African Achievers' Award
- Nigerian Unity Museum & Trade Tourism Village Ambassador, 2016
- Africa Diaspora Merit Awards Amsterdam
- Nigerian Entertainment and Lifestyle Awards London

== Filmography ==
- Black Knight
- The Last Day
- Asunder
- Dangerous Mission
- The good Son
- Blue Flames
- Ladies First
- If I Am President (2018) as Rachel / Show Host

== Southern Kaduna killings ==
After the Southern Kaduna crisis, where more than 800 people, mostly Christians were killed, Rachel Bakam and John Fashanu joined Big Church Foundation to support the victims with relief materials.
