= The Madhouse (novel) =

2021 novel by T J Benson

- First edition
- Author: T. J. Benson
- Language: English
- Genre: Fiction
- Publisher: Masobe Books
- Publication date: 5 March 2021
- Publication place: Nigeria
- Pages: 280
- ISBN: 9781485904694

The Madhouse is a 2021 novel by Nigerian writer T. J. Benson. The Madhouse centers around the life of middle belters in Nigeria.
