= One Logologo Line =

Studio album by Genevieve
- Released: December 11, 2004 (Ghana); January 1, 2006 (U.S.)
- Genre: R&B; hip hop; urban
- Label: EKB Records
- Producer: Kiki Branson

One Logologo Line is the debut album by Nollywood actress Genevieve Nnaji. It was released on December 11, 2004, by EKB Records.

== Track listing ==
1. "Ma Bre'Wo" (featuring Obour)
2. "Thinking of You" (featuring Kojo Antwi)
3. "Native Doctor" (featuring Dede)
4. "One Logologo Line" (featuring V.I.P)
5. "Bump it Up"
6. "No More"
7. "Missing You"
8. "Genevieve"
