= Sons of the Caliphate =

Nigerian TV series

- Genre: Political thriller; Political drama; Conspiracy thriller
- Created by: Dimbo Atiya
- Starring: Yakubu Muhammed; Paul Sambo; Rahama Sadau; Mofe Duncan; Yvonne Hays; Patrick Doyle; Sani Mu'azu; Rabiu Rikadawa; Magaji Mijinyawa; Nita Byack George
- Theme music composer: Jonathan Ainwokhai
- Composer: Jonathan Ainwokhai
- Country of origin: Nigeria
- Original language: English
- No. of seasons: 2
- No. of episodes: 26

Production
- Executive producer: Mo Abudu
- Producers: Dimbo Atiya; Karachi Atiya
- Production location: Abuja
- Editor: Kelvin Keshy
- Camera setup: Single-camera
- Running time: 38–52 minutes (seasons 1–2)
- Production companies: Ebonyi Life TV; Mo Abudu

Original release
- Network: Ebonylife TV (seasons 1–2); Netflix (seasons 1–2)
- Release: 13 October 2016 – 6 February 2018

Sons of the Caliphate is a Nigerian political thriller drama television series created and produced by Dimbo Atiya, directed by Kenneth Gyang and executive produced by Mo Abudu of the Ebonylife TV. It originally aired on Ebonylife TV for two season from 13 October 2016 to 6 February 2018. Season two had a global airing exclusively on Netflix.

Set in the sovereign state of northern Nigeria, Sons of the Caliphate is a political thriller drama about the lives of three rich, entitled, passionate and ambitious young men, Kalifah Maiyaki, Nuhu Bula and Diko Loko, all caught up in the deadly tussle for the governorship seat of the northern Caliphate state.

The series featured an ensemble cast from both Nollywood and Kannywood which is led by Yakubu Muhammed as Dikko Loko, Paul Sambo as Khalifa Maiyaki, Mofe Duncan as Nuhu Bula, Rahama Sadau as Binta Kutugi, and Patrick Doyle as Alhaji Loko.

== Premise ==
Khalifa Maiyaki, Nuhu Bula, and Dikko Loko are friends. Nuhu Bula and Dikko Loko are caught in a love triangle with effortlessly beautiful Binta Kutigi who is trying to get revenge on them for killing her father when she was a little girl. The political scheming begins as Kalifah Maiyaki, who happens to be the prince and son to emir of Kowa, declares his intention to contest for the Governorship of Kowa State. His father and emirate council move to stop Khalifah the heir from joining politics. His step mother intensifies her plot to have him contest in the election for her son hamza's sake who is next in line to the throne. Alhaji Sani Bula, the Billionaire wants to throw his son Nuhu into the mix for his own selfish reason contest for the governorship of Kowa State, While Alhaji Loko the political godfather ties the noose round his political structure.

== Cast and character ==
=== Main ===
- Yakubu Muhammed as Dikko Loko, son to Alhaji Loko the political godfather, is a society boy with high flier and lover to Binta Kutugi.
- Paul Sambo as Khalifa Maiyaki, Emir of Kowa's son, conflicted as husband and lover to Lottie because his wife was an arranged marriage, he never chooses her, she was given to him because of his lineage as a royalty. Khalifa is contesting for governor of Kowa state while his tries to stop him because he is the next in line to the throne.
- Mofe Duncan as Nuhu Bula, son to Sani Bula, he is a rich boy who was brought up from abroad, Nuhu was sometime force to leave his career role so that he saves the dynasty of his family which causes tension between him and his father as well as his friends.
- Rahama Sadau as Binta Kutugi, daughter to a poor farmer Kutugi, who was murder by the three rich and entitled sons of the caliphate. Binta Kutugi grew up with the intention to avenge her father's death. She is having relationship both Nuhu, Dikko and Khalifa.
- Yvonne Hays as Lottie, a mistress who happens to fall in love with the wrong person who is a prince and husband to the Galadimas' daughter.
- Patrick Doyle as Alhaji Loko, the political godfather, who turns everything in Kowa to his own direction, and to Dikko.
- Sani Mu’azu as R.H Maiyaki, the emir of kowa emirate, father of Khalifa Maiyaki who is contesting for the governor of Kowa state.
- Edward Fom as Sani Bula, a Business tycoon, the Billionaire who wants to throw his son Nuhu into the mix for his own selfish reasons

=== Recurring ===
- Victor Decker as Galadima, the Galadima of the Kowa Emirate council and father to Ziha
- Magaji Mijinyawa as Waziri, the Waziri of kowa emirate council.
- Rabiu Rikadawa as Party Chairman
- Nita Byack George as Ziha, wife to the prince and daughter to the Galadima
- Maryam Booth as Kulu
- Adunni Ade as Marina

== Episodes ==
| Series | Episodes | Originally released | | |
| Series | Episodes | First released | Last released | Network |
|---|---|---|---|---|
| 1 | 13 | 13 October 2016 | 17 May 2017 | Ebonyi Life TV; Netflix |
| 2 | 22 | 27 September 2017 | 16 May 2018 | Ebonyi Life TV; Netflix |

== Sequel ==
The sequel, War: Wrath and Revenge was released on 28 December 2023, exclusively on Netflix.
