= Rahama Sadau =

Nigerian actress, filmmaker and singer (born 1993)

Rahama
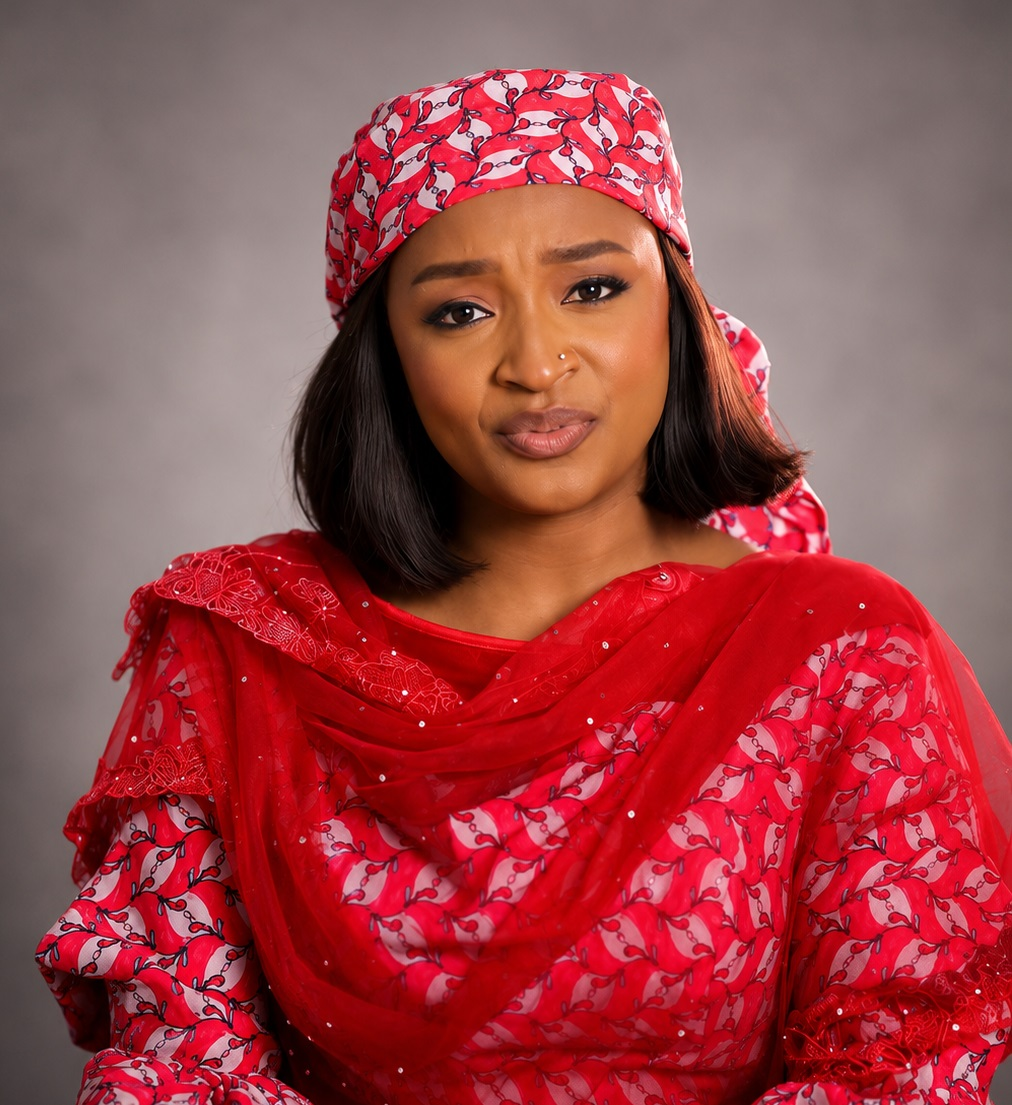
- Born: 7 December 1993 (age 32); Kaduna, Nigeria
- Education: Eastern Mediterranean University
- Occupations: Actress film maker
- Years active: 2013–present
- Notable credits: Sons of the Caliphate; Up North; MTV Shuga; If I Am President
- Partner: Ibrahim Garba
- Awards: See below
- Website: rahamasadau.com

Rahama Ibrahim Sadau ( born 7 December 1993) is a Nigerian actress and filmmaker. She rose to prominence in late 2013 after joining the Kannywood film industry with her debut in the movie Gani ga Wane.

Sadau has appeared in films across multiple Nigerian languages, including Hausa-language Kannywood productions and English-language Nollywood titles, as well as a role in a Hindi-language Bollywood film. She is also among the few Nigerian actresses reported to speak Hindi fluently.

She received the Best Actress (Kannywood) award at the City People Entertainment Awards in both 2014 and 2015. In 2015, she was named Best African Actress at the 19th African Film Awards organized by African Voice. In 2017, she was listed among the top ten hottest female Nigerian celebrities, reportedly becoming the first Hausa-language film actress to achieve that distinction.

== Early life and educations ==
Sadau was born and raised in Kaduna State, where she took part in dance competitions during her childhood and school years. Sadau studied Human Resource Management at school of Business and Finance of Eastern Mediterranean University in Northern Cyprus.

== Personal life ==
Rahma day was married to Ibrahim Garba, on the 8 of August

== Career ==
Sadau began her acting career in the Kannywood film industry in 2013, after being introduced by actor Ali Nuhu. She initially appeared in minor roles before gaining recognition for her performances in films such as Gani Ga Wane and Jinin Jikina, both alongside Nuhu.

In 2016, Sadau was named "Face of Kannywood." In the same year, she featured in a television series broadcast on EbonyLife TV. Later that year, on 3 October 2016, the Motion Picture Practitioners Association of Nigeria (MOPPAN) suspended her from participating in Kannywood productions for appearing in a romantic music video with singer Classiq. Sadau issued a formal apology to MOPPAN in 2017, and the suspension was lifted in January 2018 following the intervention of Kano State Governor Abdullahi Umar Ganduje.

In 2017, she launched her own production company, Sadau Pictures, and produced her debut film Rariya, which starred Ali Nuhu, Sani Musa Danja, Sadiq Sani Sadiq, and Fati Washa. She later returned to acting with a role as a teacher in the television drama series MTV Shuga. She reprised this role in the sixth season of the series, MTV Shuga Naija: Choices (2019), which was filmed in Nigeria and featured a cast including Timini Egbuson, Yakubu Mohammed, Uzoamaka Aniunoh, and Ruby Akabueze.

In 2022, Sadau appeared in a minor role in the Bollywood film Khuda Haafiz: Chapter 2 – Agni Pariksha, starring Vidyut Jammwal.

In addition to her acting and production work, Sadau is also a businesswoman. She is the founder of Sadau Beauty and owns an ice cream shop in Kaduna State named Yogohamy, as well as a film production company, Sadau Movies. She has served as a brand ambassador for Maltina.

Sadau also engages in philanthropic activities through her foundation, Ray of Hope. She was named a "Peace Ambassador" by the Association of Northern Nigerian Students and was appointed by the Office of the Vice President, Kashim Shettima, to serve on the Technical Committee of the Investment in Digital and Creative Enterprises (iDICE) programme.

== Filmography ==
Year	Film	Role
2024	All of Us	Ahmad's Mum
2024	The Waiter	Firida
2024	Conversations in Transit	Hajara
2024	Postcards	
2023	The Two Aishas	Aisha Jibril
2023	A Lot Like Love	Fanna
2023	War: Wrath and Revenge	Binta Kutigi Bula
2023	In Bed with the Pedros	Hauwa
2023	This Is Lagos	
2023	The Plan	
2022	Nadeeya	Nadeeya
2022	Khuda Haafiz: Chapter 2 Agni - Pariksha	
2022	Almajiri	Mama Nafisat
2022	Seeking Refuge	
2022	The American King-As told by an African Priestess	Rahama
2022	Jabalata	Queen Kada
2021	Chief Daddy 2: Going for Broke	Laila
2019	Zero Hour	
2018	Up North	Mariam
2018	If I Am President	Michelle
N/A	Aljannar Duniya	
2017	Adam	
2017	Ba Tabbas	
2017	MTV Shuga Naija	
2017	Rariya	Zainab Abuja
2017	TATU	Tatuma
2017	Rumana	
2017	Ajuwaya	
2017	Hakkunde	Aisha
2016	Sons of the Caliphate	
2016	The Other Side	
2015	Kasa Ta	
2015	Wutar Gaba	
2015	Sallamar So	
2015	Wata Tafiya	
2015	Halacci	Hiday
2015	Gidan Farko	
2015	Ana Wata ga Wata	
2015	Alkalin Kauye	
2014	Jinin Jiki Na	
2014	Hujja	
2014	Garbati	
2014	Kaddara Ko Fansa	
2014	Kisan Gilla	
2014	Mati da Lado	Rama
2014	Sabuwar Sangaya	
2014	Sirrin Da Ke Raina	
2014	So Aljannar Duniya	
2014	Suma Mata Ne	Baby Nice
2013	Farin Dare	Bilikisu
2013	Gani Ga Wane	Binta
2013	Da Kai Zan Gana	
2013	Mai Farin Jini	
2020	Mati a Zazzau	

== Awards ==
Year	Award	Category	Recipient	Result
2014	City People Entertainment Awards	Best Actress (Kannywood)	Herself	Won
2015	City People Entertainment Awards	Best Actress (Kannywood)	Herself	Won
2017	African Voice	Best African Actress	Herself	Won
2017	Best of Nollywood Awards	Best Actress in a Lead role –English	Herself for Tatu	Nominated
2017	Best of Nollywood Awards	Best Actress in a Lead role –Hausa	Herself for Matatace Shaida	Nominated
2022	Toronto International Nollywood Film Festival	Best African Actress	Herself	Won
2023	The Future Awards Africa	Prize for Acting	Herself	Pending
