= T. J. Benson =

Nigeria writer

T.J Benson
- Citizenship: Nigerian
- Occupations: Writer, Visual Artist.
- Notable work: We Won't Fade into Darkness; The Madhouse; People Live Here

T. J. Benson is a Nigerian writer and portrait photographer. Benson was a runner-up for the Short Story Day Africa Prize in 2016. His stories have appeared in literary magazines including Catapult and Transition Magazine. In 2018 he published We Won't Fade into Darkness, a collection of science and fantasy fiction short stories. The stories can be seen as an example of Africanfuturism.

Benson was an invited guest at the 2018 Aké Arts and Book Festival, moderating two panel discussions centered around filmmaking. He published his debut novel, The Madhouse, in 2021.

== Works ==
- We Won't Fade into Darkness. Paressia, 2018.
- The Madhouse. Masobe Books, 2021.
- People Live Here. Masobe Books, 2022.
