= Fuelling Poverty =

2012 film by Ishaya Bako

- Directed by: Ishaya Bako
- Written by: Ishaya Bako
- Based on: Occupy Nigeria's protests of 2012
- Produced by: Oliver Aleogena
- Starring: Wole Soyinka; Femi Falana; Nasir Ahmad el-Rufai; Seun Kuti; Desmond Elliot
- Narrated by: Wole Soyinka
- Music by: Femi Kuti; Asa
- Production companies: The Allied Film Company; Amateur Heads Media
- Release date: November 2012
- Running time: 28 mins
- Country: Nigeria

Fuelling Poverty is a 2012 Nigerian documentary film directed by Ishaya Bako that narrates the activities of the Occupy Nigeria movement when it was at its climax in early 2012. The 28-minute film features special appearances by Nobel laureate Wole Soyinka, Femi Falana, Nasir Ahmad el-Rufai, Seun Kuti and Desmond Elliot. It won the Best Documentary award at the 9th Africa Movie Academy Awards.

== Censorship ==
The Nigerian government, through the National Film and Video Censors Board (NFVCB), banned the film from public exhibition, stating that "the contents of the film are highly provocative and likely to incite or encourage public disorder and undermine national security". The producers, through the NFVCB's lawyer, were also "strongly advised not to distribute or exhibit the documentary film. All relevant national security agencies are on the alert".

== See also ==
- List of Nigerian films of 2012
