= Power of Love (2001 film) =

2001 Nigerian romantic film

- Produced by: Chuks Obiorah
- Release dates: 2001 (Part 1); 2002 (Part 2)
- Country: Nigeria
- Language: English

Power of love is a 2001 Nigerian romantic film all about betrayal, love, and forgiveness. It was directed by Tarila Thompson and written by Chuks Obiorah.

== Cast ==
- Ramsey Nouah as Chris
- Genevieve Nneji as Juliet
- Steph-Nora Okere as Sandra
- Ifeanyi Odikaesie as Ejike
- Tony Goodman as Doctor Wilson
- Ashley Nwosu as Mr Gideon
- Florence Onuma as Mrs. Gideon
- Carol Okeke as Evelyn
- Evelyn Osugo as Brenda
- Grace Amah as Rose
- Theodor Ochonogor as Franca
- Chimme Anns as Candy
- Val Agwulomu as Ekin
- Evita Eyo Ita as Michael
- Jude Ezenwa as Fred
- Aruna Kadiri as Okey
- Uche Anaje as Austin
- Chinyere Akujobi as Home maid

== Plot ==
Sandra, Chris' Ex hit Juliet and ran away from the accident scene. Chris needed some money to travel abroad so he went to Sandra who didn't believe in his dream. It was paralysed Juliet who later sponsored the trip and this made Chris determined to marry her. However his parents rejected the lady saying she is disabled and he ended up marrying sandra. After Juliet got to know Sandra was behind her accident, they fought and Sandra ended up dead and Chris married Juliet at the end.
