= Lionheart (2018 film) =

2018 Nigerian drama film

- Directed by: Genevieve Nnaji
- Written by: Genevieve Nnaji: Chinny Onwugbenu; C. J. Obasi; Ishaya Bako; Emil Garuba
- Produced by: Chinny Onwugbenu
- Starring: Genevieve Nnaji; Nkem Owoh; Pete Edochie; Onyeka Onwenu; Kanayo O. Kanayo
- Cinematography: Yinka Edward
- Edited by: George Cragg
- Music by: Kulanen Ikyo
- Production company: The Entertainment Network (T.E.N)
- Distributed by: Netflix; MPM Premium
- Release dates: 7 September 2018 (Toronto International Film Festival); 4 January 2019
- Running time: 95 minutes
- Country: Nigeria
- Languages: English (most); Igbo (10 mins.)
- Box office: ₦21.3m

Lionheart is a 2018 Nigerian drama film produced by Chinny Onwugbenu and directed by Genevieve Nnaji. It stars Pete Edochie, Genevieve Nnaji, and Nkem Owoh. It was acquired by Netflix on 7 September 2018, making it the first Netflix original film produced in Nigeria. Lionheart premiered at the 2018 Toronto International Film Festival in Canada. The movie was Nnaji's directorial debut as well as Peter Okoye's and Chibuzor Azubuike's (also known as Phyno) acting debut. The film was released worldwide on 4 January 2019 on Netflix.

Lionheart was selected as the Nigerian entry for the Best International Feature Film at the 92nd Academy Awards. It was the first time that Nigeria had submitted a film to the Oscars. On 4 November 2019, the academy disqualified the film as the majority of the dialogue is in English and only about ten minutes of the film is in Igbo.

== Plot ==
Lionheart tells the story of Adaeze Obiagu, who wants take over from her father, Chief Ernest Obiagu, when he can no longer run his company due to health issues. Her father, however, asks his brother Godswill to take his place, and Godswill and Adaeze have to work together to save the company from debt as well as a threatened takeover by businessman Igwe Pascal.

== Cast ==
- Genevieve Nnaji as Adaeze Obiagu, daughter of Chief Ernest Obiagu; Director of Logistics and Operations at the Lionheart company
- Nkem Owoh as Chief Godswill Obiagu, younger brother to Chief Ernest Obiagu; new head of the Lionheart company. He is also the managing director of the Owerri headquarters of the company.
- Pete Edochie as Chief Ernest Obiagu, owner of Lionheart company and father to Adaeze & Obiora; husband to Abigail Obiagu
- Onyeka Onwenu as Abigail Obiagu, mother of Adaeze and Obiora, wife of Chief Ernest Obiagu
- Kanayo O. Kanayo as Igwe Pascal, owner of IG Motors, who wants to buy Lionheart company
- Kalu Ikeagwu as Samuel Akah, director of Engineering Services at Lionheart company, who connives with Igwe Pascal to take over the company
- Jemima Osunde as Onyinye, personal assistant to Adaeze Obiagu
- Sani Muazu as Alhaji Danladi Maikano
- Chibuzor Azubuike (also known as Phyno) as Obiora Obiagu, brother to Adaeze Obiagu; up-and-coming musician
- Ngozi Ezeonu as Chioma Obiagu, wife of Godswill Obiagu
- Yakubu Mohammed as Hamza Maikano
- Peter Okoye as Arinze
- Chika Okpala as member of the board of directors of Lionheart

== Production ==
The movie was produced by Chinny Onwugbenu for MPM Premium in association with The Entertainment Network. Netflix acquired the worldwide distribution rights to the movie on 7 September 2018, a day before its premiere at the 2018 Toronto International Film Festival.

== Release ==
A trailer for the film was released on 24 August 2018. On 4 January 2019, the film was available to stream worldwide on Netflix.

== Critical reception ==
Lionheart has received favorable reviews from various critics. On the review aggregation website Rotten Tomatoes, the film holds a 100% approval rating with an average rating of 6.3/10 based on seven reviews. Nollywood Reinvented mentioned in their review of the film that it "works because it’s heartfelt", and rates the movie at 61%. Womentainment instead focused on the star and director, Genevieve Nnaji, recommending that people watch it "for the fierce woman who stars and directs". Nollywood Post further commends Genevieve Nnaji in its review: "Lionheart was a satisfactory story to tell in favor of feminism without it being overly the subject matter."

Meanwhile, the film also received a few negative reviews due to what some people perceived as its "unrealistic" plotline. A review on Nairametrics noted that the film's writers and producers failed to properly research the workings of the corporate environment prior to making the film. As a result, some minor blunders were made.

== See also ==
- List of Nigerian films of 2018
- List of submissions to the 92nd Academy Awards for Best International Feature Film
- List of Nigerian submissions for the Academy Award for Best International Feature Film
