= Damilare Kuku =

Nigerian writer and actress

Damilare Kuku is a Nigerian writer and actress. She is the author of the short story collection Nearly All the Men in Lagos are Mad (2021) and the novels Only Big Bumbum Matters Tomorrow (2024) and Women Rent Men and Secrets Here (2025). As an actress, she has appeared in Nollywood films and television, including the lead role in The Wildflower (2022).

== Early life ==
Kuku grew up between Lagos and Ile-Ife. She has said that she was fascinated by stories from childhood.

== Career ==
Kuku's career has spanned acting, radio presenting, producing, directing and writing.

=== Acting ===
In 2022, Kuku played the lead role of Rolake Dabiri in The Wildflower, directed by Biodun Stephen. The film follows three women living in the same compound who experience different forms of assault from men around them, and also stars Deyemi Okanlawon, Toyin Abraham and Sandra Okunzuwa. It won the audience-voted Best Film award at the 10th Nollywoodweek Film Festival in Paris in 2023.

=== Writing ===
Kuku's first book, the short story collection Nearly All the Men in Lagos are Mad, consists of twelve stories about women's relationships with men in Lagos. Masobe Books published it in Nigeria in 2021, followed by editions from Swift Press in the United Kingdom and HarperVia in the United States. It topped the 2022 Rovingheights bestseller list.

Simon & Schuster acquired UK and Commonwealth rights to a two-book deal with Kuku, and HarperVia acquired North American rights to her first novel, Only Big Bumbum Matters Tomorrow, which was published in both territories on 18 July 2024. The novel follows Temi, a young woman who announces that she plans to have a BBL and move to Lagos, which upsets her family.

Her third book, Women Rent Men and Secrets Here, was published in Nigeria by TBLNG Press in 2025.

== Bibliography ==
- Kuku, Damilare (2021). Nearly All the Men in Lagos Are Mad. Masobe Books.
- — (2024). Only Big Bumbum Matters Tomorrow. HarperVia / Simon & Schuster.
- — (2025). Women Rent Men and Secrets Here. TBLNG Press.

== Filmography ==
- Chief Daddy (2018) – film
- The Set-Up (2019) – film
- Love Is War (2019) – film
- The Wildflower (2022) – film
- Unbroken – television series
