= Ukamaka Olisakwe =

Nigerian writer

- Born: 24 October 1982 (age 43); Kano State, Northern Nigeria
- Occupations: Novelist, short story writer, screen writer
- Writing career
- Period: 2010–present

Ukamaka Evelyn Olisakwe (born 24 October 1982) is a Nigerian feminist author, short-story writer, and screenwriter. In 2014 she was chosen as one of 39 of Sub-Saharan Africa's most promising writers under the age of 40, showcased in the Africa39 project and included in the anthology Africa39: New Writing from Africa South of the Sahara (edited by Ellah Allfrey).

== Personal life and education ==
Olisakwe was born and raised in Kano State, northern Nigeria. Her parents are from eastern Nigeria. She completed her secondary education in northern Nigeria and subsequently earned a degree in Computer Science from Abia State Polytechnic, in Aba. Olisakwe was a doctoral candidate in the Department of English at the University of South Dakota, specializing in Literary Studies and Creative Writing. Her dissertation, titled "The Things They Knew", is a work of historical fiction that spans over 120 years, from the 1890s to the 2010s in Nigeria.

== Writing career ==
Olisakwe's debut novel, Eyes of a Goddess, was published in 2012.

She has written numerous short stories and articles, most of which have appeared in blogs and online journals, including Olisa.tv, Saraba, Sentinel Nigeria and Short Story Day Africa. She has been featured in the BBC. Her essays have appeared in The New York Times and various magazines including the Nigerian Telegraph and African Hadithi. She wrote the screenplay for The Calabash, a television series produced and directed by Obi Emelonye and premiered in January 2015 on Africa Magic Showcase. Olisakwe administers the blog for the Writivism Mentorship Programme, a project of the Centre for African Cultural Excellence, and was a co-facilitator at the Lagos Workshop. She was a guest and panel member at the 2014 Ake Arts and Books Festival and the Hay Festival.

Olisakwe was selected as one of the 39 most promising writers under the age of 40 from Sub-Saharan Africa and the diaspora, in the Africa39 project – a Hay Festival and Rainbow Book Club initiative in celebration of the UNESCO World Book Capital 2014 – and is included in the anthology Africa39: New Writing from Africa South of the Sahara (edited by Ellah Allfrey). Olisakwe's contribution, "This Is How I Remember it", was described by one reviewer as "a clear-eyed account of a girl's romantic awakening in Nigeria" and a story "so good it leaves us wanting more", while another reviewer described it as a "gripping story about adolescent romance, deception and yearning".

In 2016, Olisakwe was a resident at the University of Iowa's International Writing Program. In 2018, Olisakwe won the Vermont College of Fine Arts Emerging Writers Scholarship to pursue an MFA in Writing and Publishing.

In July 2020, Olisakwe founded Isele Magazine.

== Lectures ==
Olisakwe was a guest at the 2015 Writivism Festival in Kampala, Uganda, where she taught a fiction master-class. On 28 May 2015, she spoke on the topic "You Could Stop The Next Maternal Death Statistic" at TEDxGarki.

== Recognition ==
- 2014: Listed among Africa39 project of 39 writers aged under 40.
- 2014: Listed among This Is Africa's "Best 100 Books 2010–2014" for Eyes of a Goddess.

== Bibliography ==
=== Novels ===
- — (2012). Eyes of a Goddess. Piraeus Books. ISBN 9780985203818.
- — (2020) Ogadinma, or Everything Will Be All Right. The Indigo Press.
- — (2023) Don't Answer When They Call Your Name. Masobe Books.

=== Short stories ===
- — (May 2011). "Girl to Woman". Sentinel Nigeria.
- — (October 2014). "This is how I remember it". Africa39: New Writing from Africa South of the Sahara.

=== Articles ===
- — (2013). "Of Rising and the Home-Based Nigerian Writer". Saraba. Archived from the original on 26 December 2014.
- — (11 March 2014). "The North is Dead". African Hadithi. Archived from the original on 12 April 2014.
- — (1 December 2014). "Growing Up Fearful in Nigeria". The New York Times.
- — (8 April 2015). "In Nigeria, an Election to Believe In". The New York Times.
