= Yakubu Muhammed =

Nigerian actor and singer (born 1973)

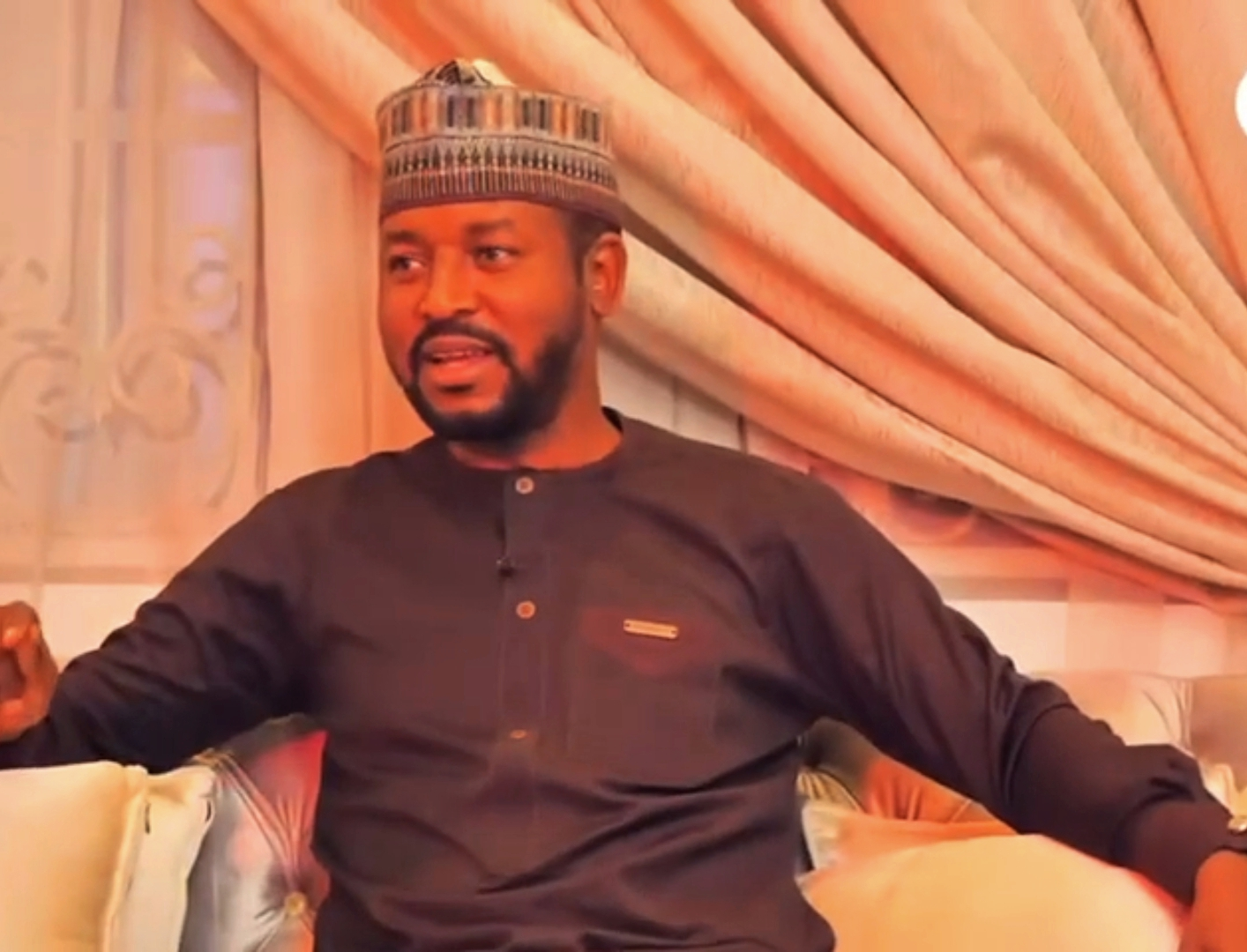
- Nigerian actor, Yakubu Muhammad performing on stage
- Born: 25 March 1973 (age 53); Gombe, Nigeria
- Education: Mass Communication (BSc)
- Alma mater: University of Jos, Bayero University Kano
- Occupations: Film actor, producer, director, singer, script writer
- Years active: 1998–present
- Known for: Sons of the Caliphate; Lionheart; MTV Shuga; 4th Republic

Yakubu Mohammed (alias: Yakubu Usman Shehu Abubakar El-Nafati) (born 25 March 1973) is a Nigerian actor, producer, director, singer and script writer. He is a Globacom ambassador, SDGs ambassador and at a time, an ambassador for Nescafe Beverage. He has sung over 1000 songs, featured in over 100 Hausa films and more than 40 English films some of which includes; Lionheart, 4th Republic, Sons of the Caliphate and MTV Shuga which earned him City People Entertainment Awards and Nigeria Entertainment Awards.

== Career ==
Yakubu Mohammed started off in Kannywood as at 1998 writing scripts and working behind the scene. Along the line, he got trained on the job whilst rising through the ranks and files and in no time found himself calling the shots. Yakubu as a music artist has recorded over 1000 songs for film music and albums in Hausa and English. After working from the background for so long he got his first movie gig in Gabar Cikin Gida in 2013 where he got featured alongside his friend and partner Sani Musa Danja. He made a cross over to Nollywood in 2016 with a debut in Sons of the Caliphate together with his colleague Rahama Sadau and also got featured in MTV's Shuga and Lionheart.

=== Nollywood movies ===
Year	Title	Role	Note
2016	Sons of The Caliphate	Dikko	TV Series 25 episodes
2017	MTV Shuga Naija		
	Queen Amina		
2018	Make Room		
2018	LionHeart	Hamza Maikano	
	Asawana		
2019	4th Republic	Danladi	
2019	Tenant of The House	Hon. Samuel	
2015	Dark Closet		
2018	Fantastic Numbers		Comedy Drama
2016	Walking Away		
	My Village Bride		
	Chauffeur		
2015	Damaged Petals	Jerry	
	Bunmi's Diary		
2015	Power of Tomorrow	Agent Kingsley	Drama
	My Neighbor's Wife		
2017	My Wife's Lover	Francis	Drama
2013	Blue Flames		
	April Hotel		
2017	Women	Demola	Drama
	Wings of A Dove		
2020	Badamasi	Prof. Jibril Aminu	Biography / History / Thriller
2022	Rising: City of Dreams		
	Invaders		
	Wedding in Nigeria		
	Aisha		
	Ikemba		
2023	Love, Lust & Other Things	Bamaiyi Bako	
	Beyond the Veil	Sadiq	
	The Plan	Nasiru Koda	
2024	Hijack '93	Usman	Disaster film
	Kaka		
	Allura Cikin Ruwa	Maina	
	The Kiss of Death	Musa	
	The Suyis	Danjuma	

=== Kannywood movies ===
ND	Cikin Waye
2013	Gabar Cikin Gida
2013	Da Kai Zan Gana
2013	Mai Farin Jini
2013	Nas
2013	Romeo Da Jamila
2013	Sani Nake So
2013	Shu'uma (The Evil Woman)
2014	Soyayya Da Shakuwa
2014	So Aljannar Duniya
2014	Sai A Lahira
2014	Munubiya
2014	Hakkin Miji
2014	Duniyar Nan
2014	Bikin Yar Gata
2015	Kayar Ruwa
2016	Son of Caliphate
2016	Hawaye Na
2016	Yar Mulki

== See also ==
IMDb
