= Love Grows Stronger in Death =

2024 anthology of African short fiction

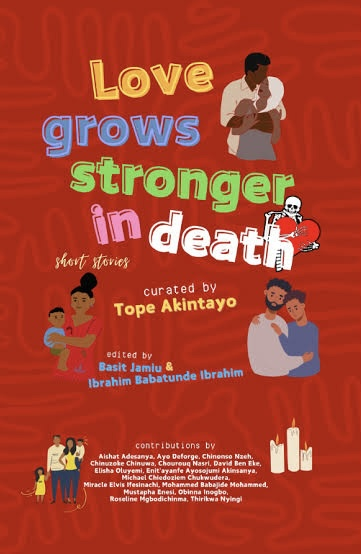
- Editor: Tope Akintayo (curator) Ibrahim Babátúndé Ibrahim (co-editor) Basit Jamiu (co-editor)
- Genre: Anthology
- Publisher: Witsprouts Books
- Publication date: May 24, 2024
- Media type: Paperback, Ebook
- Pages: 187
- ISBN: 9789787880876

Love Grows Stronger in Death is an anthology of short stories, curated by Tope Akintayo, co-edited by Ibrahim Babatunde Ibrahim, and Basit Jamiu. It was published in May 2024 by Witsprouts Books. The anthology includes stories by 15 emerging writers, focusing on themes such as love, loss, and grief.

Love Grows Stronger in Death is an anthology by Witsprouts Anthologies, a platform that celebrates African literary brilliance and builds a community for emerging writers.

== Themes and Stories ==
Love Grows Stronger in Death examines the human experience of love, loss, and grief, and how unexplored affections and lost opportunities are felt more profoundly when loss happens. The stories in this anthology provide new insights on the complexities of human relationships and the universal human experiences that connect us as human beings. It also examines the experience of the characters with loss, especially with terminal diseases like Alzehmiers and cancer, and how this impacts the manner by which grieving individuals deal with society.

== Contributors ==
The anthology features stories by the following emerging writers from Africa:

- Enit’ayanfe Ayosojumi Akinsanya
- Roseline Mgbodichinma
- Mustapha Enesi
- Chinuzoke Chinuwa
- Chourouq Nasri
- David Ben Eke
- Michael Chiedoziem Chukwudera
- Chinonso Nzeh
- Ayo Deforge
- Elisha Oluyemi
- Obinna Inogbo
- Mohammed Babajide Mohammed
- Aishat Adesanya
- Miracle Elvis Ifesinachi
- Thirikwa Nyingi

== Reception ==
It has been criticized for its unique and interesting stories that address issues about love and death. The language used by the authors and their skill in crafting interesting stories have been recognized. In reviewing this anthology, Chimezie Chika, in his article published in Afrocritik, stated: “While reviewing this anthology, it became apparent to me that even though this is a small sample of the deluge of writing coming out of Africa, Love Grows Stronger in Death represents, in many ways, the nature of writing being produced by young writers on the continent.” Sunday Aikulola, in his review published in The Guardian, criticized the anthology for not having a fair share of women writers: “Love Grows Stronger in Death is a compelling read, filled with brilliant writing that draws the reader in from start to finish. It could, however, benefit from a more diverse range of contributors, particularly more female writers.”
