= Dreams and Assorted Nightmares =

2020 short story collection by Abubakar Adam Ibrahim

Dreams and Assorted Nightmares is a short-story collection by Nigerian writer Abubakar Adam Ibrahim, published by Masobe Books in 2020.

== Themes and structure ==
The collection consists of interconnected stories set in the fictional town of Zango, where everyday life intersects with supernatural and fantastical events. Zango provides a connection between the lives of its inhabitants, whose experiences include grief, infidelity, religious fanaticism and troubled family relationships.

== Reception ==
In a review for The Lagos Review, Uchenna Emelife discussed the collection's interconnected structure, its setting and Ibrahim's combination of fantastical elements with recognisable human experiences. Olukorede Yishau of The Nation, reviewed the stories' emotional intensity and tragic endings, noting that "This book about broken people will be worth your time." Sage Hassan, in a review for Daily Trust, highlighted its dark atmosphere, vivid characters and use of horror and supernatural elements.
