= I Do Not Come to You By Chance =

2009 novel Adaobi Tricia Nwaubani

- Author: Adaobi Tricia Nwaubani
- Language: English
- Genre: Literary Fiction
- Publisher: Hachette Books
- Publication place: Nigeria
- Media type: Print (paperback)
- Pages: 416 pp (first edition)
- ISBN: 978-1-4013-2311-0 (first edition)
- OCLC: 262885023

I Do Not Come to You By Chance is a 2009 novel by Nigerian writer Adaobi Tricia Nwaubani. It is her debut novel, which was published on 1 May 2009 by Hachette Books, an imprint of Perseus Books Group.

== Plot summary ==
I Do Not Come to You By Chance follows Kingsley Ibe, a newly minted engineering graduate from an upstanding middle-class Nigerian family. After a crisis plunges his family into financial distress and unable to find a job, he turns to his uncle Boniface in desperation. Known as Cash Daddy, Boniface is an email scammer and "419" kingpin— named after the 419 section of the Nigerian criminal code—and willingly draws Kingsley into the dark underbelly world of email scamming.

== Reception ==
- 2010: Commonwealth Writers Prize for Best First Book (Africa).
- 2010: Betty Trask First Book Award.
- 2010: Wole Soyinka Prize for Literature in Africa finalist.
- 2012: Nigeria Prize for Literature shortlist.
- The Washington Post Best Books 2009.

== Film adaptation ==
The film adaptation was directed by Ishaya Bako and was executively produced by Genevieve Nnaji. It premiered at the 2023 Toronto International Film Festival.
