= The Mechanics of Yenagoa =

2021 novel by Michael Afenfia

- First edition
- Author: Michael Afenfia
- Language: English
- Genre: Fiction
- Publisher: Masobe Books
- Publication date: 11 May 2020
- Publication place: Nigeria
- Pages: 305
- ISBN: 9789785728118

The Mechanics of Yenagoa is a 2020 novel by Nigerian-Canadian writer Michael Afenfia.

== Plot ==
The Mechanics of Yenagoa is about Ebinimi a Mechanic in Yenagoa. It explores the dynamics between working-class people and the day-to-day activities of the people of Yenagoa.

== Awards and recognition ==
- Top 11 Books to expect in 2020 by Daily Trust.
- Among the notable books of 2020 by YNaija.
