= Ogadinma, or Everything Will Be All Right =

2020 novel by Ukamaka Olisakwe

Ogadinma or, Everything Will Be Alright
- First edition
- Author: Ukamaka Olisakwe
- Language: English
- Genre: Literary fiction
- Set in: South East Nigeria
- Publisher: Indigo Press
- Publication date: June 18, 2020
- Publication place: Nigeria
- Pages: 256
- ISBN: 978-1-911648-16-1
- Preceded by: Eyes of a Goddess

Ogadinma, or Everything Will Be All Right is a novel written by Nigerian author Ukamaka Olisakwe.

== plot ==
The novel talks about a young lady’s struggle while growing up. From failed romances, to thwarted dreams, to her emancipation. The themes explored in the book are Feminism, patriarchy and societal expectations.
