= Georgina Onuoha =

Nigerian actress and model

- Born: September 29
- Education: LASU
- Occupation: Actress
- Years active: 1990- till present
- Notable work: Living in Bondage
- Spouse: Ifeanyi Igwegbe
- Children: 2

Georgina Onuoha (born September 29, 1980) is a Nollywood actress, model, television personality, and philanthropist.

She is from Anambra state in South Eastern Nigeria.

== Early life and education ==
Georgina was born and raised in Lagos, where she attended Badagry Grammar School for her secondary school and earned her West African Senior Certificate. Following that, she continued on to LASU, where she completed two degrees. Prior to earning a bachelor's degree in international relations and strategic studies, the applicant first earned an associate degree in international law and diplomacy.

== Career ==
She joined the Nigerian movie industry in 1990 at the age of 10 years. She came to fame in 1992 after acting in the movie titled "Living in Bondage". she was nominated for a best-supporting actress at the Africa Movie Academy Awards.

She publicly criticized the Nigerian government for the removal of fuel subsidies in 2016. In an Instagram post in March 2016, she claimed to have been suffering from an unnamed illness for 8 years.

She also criticized Yul Edochie on having a second wife.

She is married to her American-based husband, Ifeanyi Igwegbe and they have two daughters.

== See also ==
- List of Nigerian actors
