= Witsprouts =

Nigerian cultural organization

- Formation: January 2018
- Founder: Tope Akintayo
- Type: Social enterprise
- Website: https://witsprouts.com/

Witsprouts is an arts and culture organization that creates platforms for African arts and culture to be showcased to a global audience. Its activities include publishing, cultural management, literary and art curation, and creative workshops.

== History and background ==
Witsprouts was founded by Tope Akintayo in January 2018, initially as a personal development platform. In 2020, Witsprouts shifted its focus to promoting African creative expression and began to host various cultural projects. One of Witsprouts early initiatives was the Afroanthology series curated and edited by Basit Jamiu, which published its first anthology, Selves, in 2018, followed by additional themed collections in subsequent years.

== Witsprouts Books ==
Witsprouts' publishing division, Witsprouts Books, produces print and digital editions of anthologies and standalone titles by emerging writers. Witsprouts Books' anthology titles includes curated collections of short fiction and creative nonfiction: Selves, The Year of Free Birds, Twenty-20: Stories and Lessons from the Pandemic Year, and Love Grows Stronger in Death. In 2024, Witsprouts Books enlists an advisory board for its anthology to provide editorial and publishing direction for the project.

== Witsprouts Storytelling Prize ==
In April 2025, Witsprouts launched the Witsprouts Storytelling Prize, to revive and celebrate the African oral storytelling tradition in a modern, digital format, opening entries to Nigerians for original 5–10 minute video performances on the theme “Rebooting Legends and Memories”. The prize offers ₦500,000 to the winner.

The winner of the inaugural prize, announced on October 2, 2025, was Rachel Ajisafe for her performances, "Haunting Song of Promises," which focused on Yoruba folklore of Oluronbi, and "The King Who Became Lightning," which focused on the Yoruba òrìṣà, Ṣàngó. The judging panel, which included writer and filmmaker Jude Idada and playwright Akanbi Taofeek, commended Ajisafe for her "natural storytelling with a poetic flair," energetic delivery, and ability to create stunning visual imagery through words.
