= Yes International! =

Nigerian celebrity magazine

- Editor-in-Chief: Azuh Arinze
- Photographer: Tokunbo Ibikunle
- Categories: Celebrity, human interest, news
- Publisher: Azuh Arinze
- Founder: Azuh Arinze
- Founded: 19 July 2011; 15 years ago
- Company: Honours Communications Limited
- Country: Nigeria
- Based in: Ikeja
- Language: English
- Website: theyesng.com

Yes International! is a Nigerian daily soft sell magazine that specializes in celebrity news and human-interest stories published by Azuh Arinze.

== History ==
Yes International! was founded by Azuh Arinze in 2011 after he exited as the editor of Encomium Magazine. In 2013, Yes International! published an interview with Genevieve Nnaji, which Nnaji called a lie, days later, Yes International! said it was an old interviewer.
