= Michael Afenfia =

Nigerian writer

- Citizenship: Nigerian
- Occupation: Novelist
- Writing career
- Genre: Fiction
- Notable works: The Mechanics of Yenagoa and Leave My Bones in Saskatoon

Michael Afenfia is a Nigerian novelist. He is the author of The Mechanics of Yenagoa and Leave My Bones in Saskatoon. His works focus on themes such as life in the Niger Delta and experiences of migration.
