= Buried Beneath the Baobab Tree =

2018 novel by Adaobi Tricia Nwaubani

- First edition cover
- Author: Adaobi Tricia Nwaubani
- Publisher: Katherine Tegen Books
- Publication date: September 4, 2018
- ISBN: 978-0-062-69672-4

Buried Beneath the Baobab Tree is a 2018 young adult social novel written by Nigerian novelist Adaobi Tricia Nwaubani, published by Katherine Tegen Books, an imprint of HarperCollins.

== Plot ==
The novel centres on the abduction and return of the Chibok girls. Narrated by a character called Ya Ta, the novel gives an insight into the abduction and Islamization of the abducted young students. On abduction, the students are given choices, either convert to Islam or die; Ya Ta and her friend Sarah choose life. Ya Ta (later known a Salamatu) holds on to her Christian faith, while, Sarah (layer known as Zainab) falls in love with the "husband" that was assigned to her.

== Critical receptions ==
Buried Beneath the Baobab Tree received starred reviews from Booklist, Kirkus Reviews, and Publishers Weekly. The Bulletin of the Center for Children's Books, Common Sense Media, and School Library Journal also reviewed the novel.

In 2018, Booklist named it in their list of the best fiction for older readers. The following year, the Young Adult Library Services Association included it on their Best Fiction for Young Adults and Amazing Audiobooks for Young Adults lists.
