= Nearly All the Men in Lagos are Mad =

2021 short story collection by Damilare Kuku

- First edition
- Author: Damilare Kuku
- Language: English
- Genre: Literary fiction
- Set in: Lagos
- Publisher: Masobe Books
- Publication place: Nigeria
- Media type: Print, ebook
- Pages: 243
- ISBN: 978-9-789-90719-9

Nearly All the Men in Lagos are Mad is a short story collection written by Nigerian author and actress Damilare Kuku. It was first published by Masobe Books in 2021. The twelve short stories describe various women and their experiences with men and relationships. The stories in this book are set in Lagos, Nigeria. This book depicts the hazards of attempting to find enduring love and friendship in Africa's wildest metropolis with humour, wisdom, and empathy that will prove universal and informative.
