= Kulanen Ikyo =

Nigerian film composer

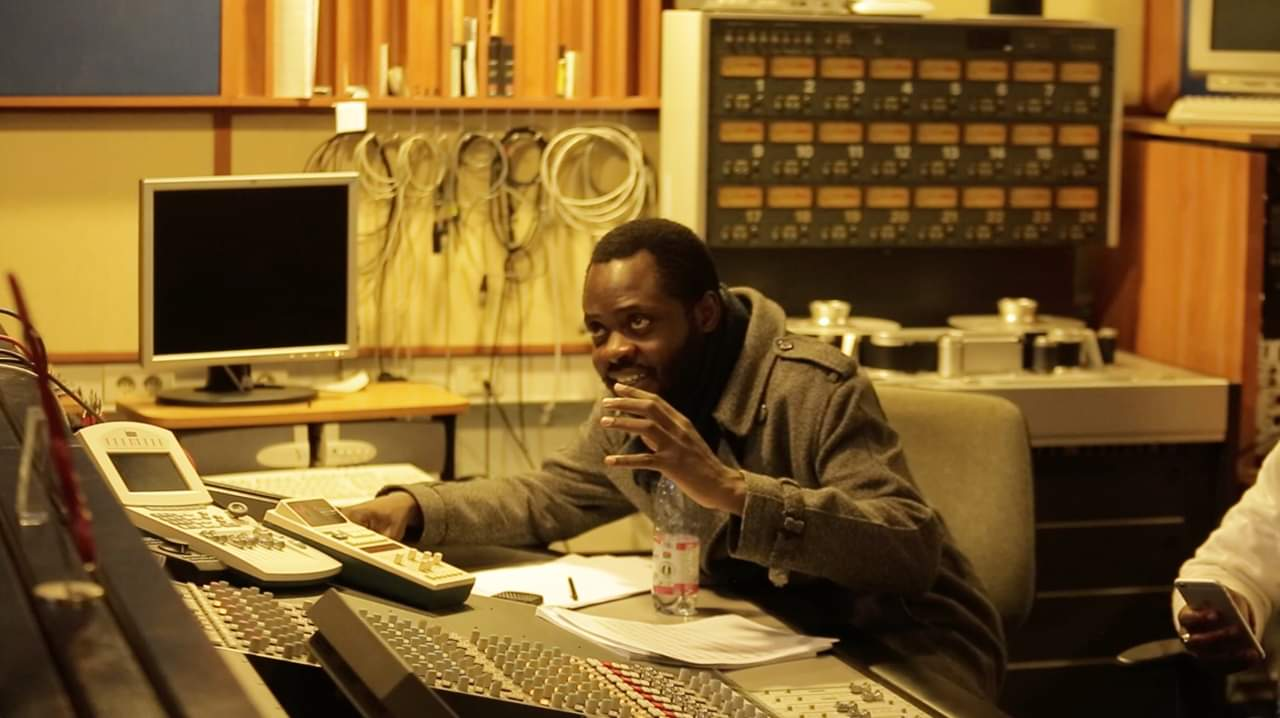

Background information
- Born: 5 August; Benue State, Nigeria
- Occupations: Film composer, sound editor, record producer
- Years active: 2014–present

Kulanen Ikyo is a Nigerian composer and sound editor. He is best known for his work on the films Lionheart, The CEO, and October 1 and television series Blood Sisters.

== Life and career ==
Kulanen was born in Benue State, Nigeria and graduated from the University of Jos with a Physics degree. He made his debut as a composer in the historical fiction film October 1, directed by Kunle Afolayan. The movie won the best sound editor award at the 2015 Africa Magic Viewers Choice Awards.

== Filmography ==
=== As Composer ===
- October 1 (2014)
- Road to Yesterday (2015)
- Henna (2015)
- The CEO (2016)
- Okafor's Law (2016)
- Lionheart (2018)
- If I Am President (2018)
- 4th Republic (2019)
- Oloture (2019)
- Blood Sisters (2022 series)
- The Black Book (2023 film)

== Awards and nominations ==
Year	Result	Award	Category	Work
2016	Nominated	AMVCA	Best Sound Editor	Road to Yesterday
2015	Won	AMVCA	Best Sound Editor	October 1
