= Laolu Senbanjo =

Nigerian artist, jurist and singer (born 1982)

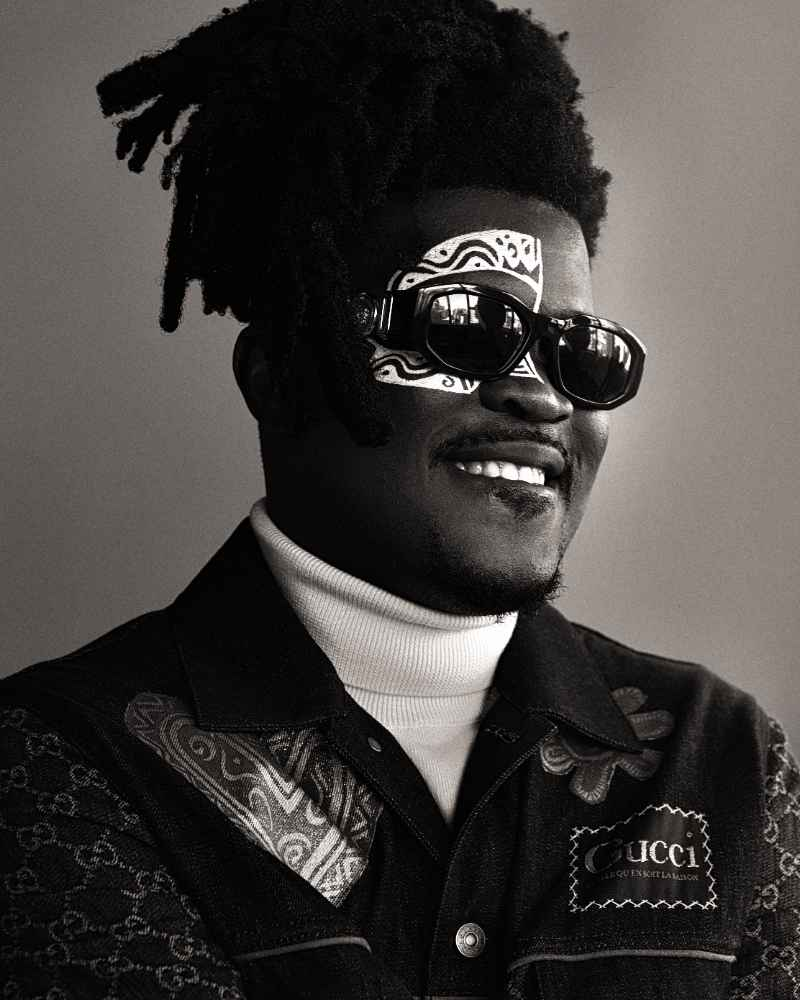
- Born: Lagos, Nigeria
- Known for: The Sacred Art of the Ori
- Notable work: Beyonce's Visual Album, Lemonade
- Website: http://www.laolu.nyc

Laolu (Olaolu) Senbanjo, also known as "Laolu NYC", is a Nigerian visual artist, musician, singer-songwriter and former human rights attorney.

== Early life ==
Senbanjo was born and raised in Ilorin, Nigeria by Yoruba parents. His father was a lawyer, his mother was a nurse. He grew up performing in his church's choir. While in school he had a music group called Light and Fire which performed original songs and covers.

Senbanjo studied law at Nigeria's Law School and, despite wanting to drop out during his second year, received his degree in 2005. He then worked as a human rights lawyer for five years, spending his final three years working at the National Human Rights Commission as a senior legal officer focusing on women and children's rights. Senbanjo travelled to different parts of Northern Nigeria visiting schools and villages to educate men and women about why children should be in school.

"I knew if I pursued a career in the arts, I'd have to live with the fact that some people in my hometown might never talk to me again", said Senbanjo in an interview with 99U. Despite this, in 2010 Senbanjo quit his job as a lawyer and started the Laolu Senbanjo Art Gallery in Abuja, Nigeria.

Senbanjo moved to Brooklyn, New York, in August 2013 to pursue his art career.

== Visual art ==
Senbanjo has coined his style of art, Afromysterics, meaning mystery of the African thought pattern. It incorporates African themes and African traditions. His uses charcoal and distinct patterns to create complex, story-rich art designs that draw heavily on his Yoruba heritage and feature ancient Nigerian symbols and patterns. Senbanjo says his Nigerian roots are a major source for his visual inspiration. Though his visual references have been described as sharing "affinities with Jean-Michel Basquiat and Keith Haring".

He has had commissions from and formed partnerships with, celebrities and brand titans including Nike, Beyoncé's album Lemonade, the Grammy Museum and the Smithsonian Institution. He has also partnered with Danielle Brooks (who plays Tasha Jefferson on the Netflix series Orange Is the New Black). In June 2015, Senbanjo's new mantra became "everything is my canvas" and he began painting on everything from shoes, to jackets, to people. He created the Sacred Art of the Ori Ritual, which he describes and explains in an 11 September 2017 TED talk. In his TED talk, Senbanjo talks about his work Dreamscape. In Laolu Senbanjo's 2018 print, Dreamscape, he reflects his frustration with the injustice in the world. Working as a human rights attorney, he saw cases with children who faced the harsh reality of getting forced into marriage or continuing their education at a university. The artwork "is a mind map," starting where most life does, from a vagina, to then connecting the journey of life and all that comes with that experience to the origin story of being born. Some of the print's "major themes include religion, war, politics, technology, Egyptology, sexuality, economics, environmental waste, media, history, music, greed and human nature." Like most of his art, a bold design connects each element in the work inspired by his Yoruba ancestry. Another example of his art style and ancestral Yoruba influence that is more well-known is showcased in Beyoncé’s Lemonade, where Senbanjo's body art is showcase throughout the visual album.

=== Selected exhibitions and talks ===
- December 2014: Three shows at Art Basel Miami.
- May 2016: His exhibit "Sounds of Africa" opens at the Grammy Museum in Los Angeles, CA in collaboration with BET.
- September 2016: Laolu performs " Creation as a Ritual: Performing Disguise", a live art installation featuring three dancers and live musicians, at the Brooklyn Museum.

=== Art appearances in selected music videos ===
Senbanjo and his Sacred Art of the Ori Ritual has been featured in various music videos, including:

- April 2015: "Come with me." by South African Black Coffee (DJ)
- April 2016: Sorry from Beyonce's Visual Album, Lemonade
- September 2017: "Big Bad Soca" by Bunji Garlin
- February 2018: "Catch Your Eye" by Jussie Smollett ft Swizz Beatz
- October 2019: "LA CANCIÓN" by J Balvin x Bad Bunny

=== Brand collaborations ===
Senbanjo has been invited to collaborate with several brands, including:

- Nike invites Senbanjo to become a Master of Air and create a T-shirt and sneaker design for Nike Air Max 2016, for sneaker enthusiasts.
- October 2016: Shoe designer Kenneth Cole and Laolu collaborate on a #MyStepsWill advertising campaign.
- BVLGARI Man in Black Essence limited edition Cologne bottle
- Limited-edition packaging for Starbucks Espresso Roast, also available as a ceramic double-wall tumbler, 2018
- Belvedere Vodka Limited-edition bottle, 2018
- NYC Fashion week
- Apple Inc., 2019
- Target Corporation, 2019
- Essence cover with Serena Williams, 2019
- Facebook Lift Black Voices Artwork, 2020
- Instagram
- Barclays Center

== Music ==
Senbanjo is a world music artist who draws influences from Fela Kuti, Sade (singer), Bob Marley, and King Sunny Adé. He is a singer, producer, and guitarist. His musical style is deeply rooted in the traditions of Afrobeat and High Life, mixed with Afro-Soul and Reggae. Senbanjo blends singing in his native Yoruba language and often translates Yoruba folks songs, proverbs and his oriki into English.

=== Work with Beyoncé on Lemonade ===
Laolu Senbanjo was contacted by Beyoncé's company, Parkwood Entertainment to work on the visual album Lemonade. In an interview with Essence Magazine, Senbanjo states that "[Beyoncé] told me what I did with the body art, what I did with my shoes and jackets was so unreal." Senbanjo and Beyoncé officially met when she pulled him aside on set to thank him for joining the project. Lemonade includes themes of African diaspora and Black womanhood. He painted the faces and bodies of the dancers and Beyoncé, which can be seen in the Sorry music video. In the video, Beyoncé and other women have their faces painted in Ori, a Yoruba tradition, done by Senbanjo.

=== Select music appearances ===
- September 2014: Senbanjo opened for Tony Allen (musician) (the creator of Afrobeat) at SOB's in New York City, NY with his band Laolu and the Afromysterics.
- March 2015: Laolu and the Afromysterics performed at South by Southwest in Austin, Texas.

== See also ==
- Performance art
