= Adaobi Tricia Nwaubani =

Nigerian novelist (born 1976)

- Born: Adaobi Tricia Obinne Nwaubani; 1976 (age 49–50); Enugu, Enugu State, Nigeria
- Occupation: Novelist
- Notable work: I Do Not Come To You By Chance (2009)
- Website: adaobitricia.com/index.html

Adaobi Tricia Obinne Nwaubani // (born 1976) is a Nigerian novelist, humorist, essayist and journalist. Her debut novel, I Do Not Come To You By Chance, won the 2010 Commonwealth Writers' Prize for Best First Book (Africa), a Betty Trask First Book award, and was named by The Washington Post as one of the Best Books of 2009. Her debut Young Adult novel, Buried Beneath the Baobab Tree, based on interviews with girls kidnapped by Boko Haram, was published by HarperCollins in September 2018. It won the 2018 Raven Award for Excellence in Arts and Entertainment, was named as one of the American Library Association’s Best Fiction for Young Adults, and is a Notable Social Studies Trade Books for Young People 2019 selection.

== Biography ==
Nwaubani was born in Enugu, Nigeria, to Chief Chukwuma Hope Nwaubani and Dame Patricia Uberife Nwaubani on 28 March 1976. Nwaubani was raised by both parents in her hometown Umuahia, Abia State, among the Igbo people. Her family is descended from members of the Nigerian chieftaincy system; her great-grandfather Chief Nwaubani Ogogo Oriaku – the source of her surname – was a famous chief and a trader licensed by the Royal Niger Company in the late 19th century. His goods included slaves.

At the age of 10, she left home to attend boarding school at the Federal Government Girls College Owerri. She studied Psychology at the University of Ibadan, Nigeria's premier university. As a teenager, Nwaubani secretly dreamed of becoming a CIA or KGB agent. She earned her first income from winning a writing competition at the age of 13. Her mother is a cousin to Flora Nwapa, the first female African writer to publish a book. In her first year at University, she was a member of the Idia Hall Chess Team, and also a member of the university's (classical music) choir.

Nwaubani was one of the pioneer editorial staff of Nigeria's now defunct NEXT newspapers, established by Pulitzer Prize-winning journalist Dele Olojede.

I Do Not Come to You by Chance is Nwaubani's debut novel, published in 2009. Set in the world of Nigerian email scams, the book tells the story of a young man, Kingsley, who turns to his Uncle Boniface for help in bailing his family out of poverty. In 2019, Masobe Books earned the rights to publish I Do Not Come to You by Chance in Nigeria.

Adaobi Tricia Nwaubani lives in Abuja, Nigeria, where she works as a consultant.

== Influences ==
Nwaubani has expressed concern over the largely somber tone of African novels. She credits Irish-American writer Frank McCourt's Pulitzer-winning Angela's Ashes with showing her that she could write on serious issues in a humorous tone. She is also a great admirer of British humorist P. G. Wodehouse.

== Awards ==
- 2010: Commonwealth Writers Prize for Best First Book (Africa)
- 2010: Betty Trask First Book Award
- 2010: Wole Soyinka Prize for Literature in Africa finalist
- 2012: Nigeria Prize for Literature shortlist
- 2009: The Washington Post Best Books
- 2018: Recipient of the Raven Award of Excellence for her book "Buried Beneath the Baobab Tree"
- 2019: Arthur L. Carter Journalism Institute Reporting Award

== Works ==
- I Do Not Come To You By Chance, 2009
- Buried Beneath the Baobab Tree, HarperCollins, 2018
