= Ishaya Bako =

Nigerian film director and screenwriter

- Born: December 30, 1986 (age 39); Kaduna
- Citizenship: Nigerian
- Education: Covenant University, London Film School
- Occupations: Film director and screenwriter
- Known for: His film Fuelling Poverty
- Notable work: Fuelling Poverty

Ishaya Bako (born 30 December 1986) is a Nigerian film director and screenwriter.

== Early life ==
He was born in Kaduna, where he lived most of his life before moving later to London where he studied at the London Film School.

== Career ==
After attending the London Film School, Bako wrote and directed the Braids on a Bald Head, which received recognition at the Africa Movie Academy Awards (AMAA). He won the Best Short Film award at the 8th Africa Movie Academy Awards. He has also been identified as part of a younger generation of filmmakers and is a member of the Global Shapers Community, an initiative of the World Economic Forum that brings together young professionals.

His film, Fuelling Poverty, a documentary on poverty and fuel subsidy in Nigeria, is narrated by Nobel Laureate, Wole Soyinka He lives in Abuja, FCT, Nigeria. His film The Royal Hibiscus Hotel was screened at the 2017 Toronto International Film Festival.

He also was one of the writers for the movie Lionheart (2018 film). In 2023, Bako directed I Do Not Come to You by Chance, an adaptation of Adaobi Tricia Nwaubani’s award-winning 2009 novel. The film was an official selection for the 2023 Toronto International Film Festival. He also directed the 2024 film on Nigeria's electricity sector 'Up NEPA' which premiered in Abuja on May 9th, 2024.

== See also ==
- List of Nigerian actors
- List of Nigerian film producers
- List of Nigerian film directors
