= Nollywood Movies =

Nollywood

Ownership
- Owner: Nollywood Movies Limited

History
- Launched: January 2008

Links
- Website: nollywoodmovies.tv

Nollywood Movies is an online subscription movie television channel, formerly broadcast in the United Kingdom on Sky channel 327. Each month the channel offers over 30 different new and recently released Nigerian movies, 24 hours a day. It is the first such channel in operation in the UK. Films offered are primarily in English, with some subtitled, in genres including drama, comedy, romance, family, thriller, traditional, fantasy and true story films. The channel is funded through subscription and advertising.

Nollywood Movies launched on TalkTalk TV YouView in 2013, on channel 477. The channel was part of the African TV Boost. It moved to 557 on 2 June 2015, but was removed on 30 November 2015. Nollywood Movies was removed from the Virgin Media platform on 22 February 2018, and satellite transmissions ended on 1 May 2018.
