= Isele Magazine =

Nigerian literary magazine

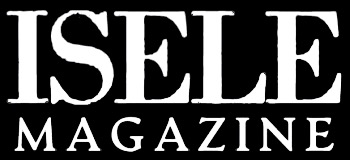
- Editor: Ukamaka Olisakwe
- Categories: Literary Magazine
- Publisher: Ukamaka Olisakwe
- First issue: 30 July 2020
- Language: English
- Website: www.iselemagazine.com
- ISSN: 2766-2470

Isele Magazine is a literary magazine that publishes fiction, poetry, essays, interviews, and book reviews.

== History ==
Isele Magazine was founded in July 2020 by Nigerian novelist Ukamaka Olisakwe.

In an interview with Open Country Mag, she explained that the magazine is a tribute to late grandmother, alias 'Isele Nwanyi', who was a dancer and a performance poet.

The magazine published its first issue in July 2020 and made a call for submissions, inviting "writers and artists who hold a mirror to our society, who challenge conventional expectations about ways of being, how to be, and who decides who should be."

In October 2021, the magazine published a call for The Woman Issue, seeking submissions that "subvert the tropes and narratives associated with and definitive of womanhood."
