= List of African films of 2014 =

The film industries of the 54 countries that make up Africa produced over two hundred feature films in 2014. This article fully lists all non-pornographic films, including short films, that had a release date in that year and which were at least partly made by an African country. It does not include films first released in previous years that had release dates in 2014. Nor does it include films made in countries such as France, Spain or the United Kingdom, which though they have territories in Africa are primarily non-African states, unless they are co-productions with African countries.
Also included is an overview of the major events in African film, including film festivals and awards ceremonies, as well as lists of those films that have been particularly well received, both critically and financially. The year was particularly notable for the release of Timbuktu, the first Mauritanian film ever nominated for the Academy Award for best foreign language film.

== Major releases ==
Opening		Title	Cast and Crew	Details	Country	Genre(s)	Ref.
J A N U A R Y	17	Fishing Without Nets	Director: Cutter Hodierne; Cast: Eric Godon, Abdiwali Farrah, Abdikhadir Hassan, Idil Ibrahim, Abdi Kani, Reda Kateb	Think Media Studios	Kenya; Somalia	Drama	
J A N U A R Y	18	Difret	Director: Zeresenay Berhane Mehari; Cast: Meron Getnet, Tizita Hagere	Haile Addis Pictures	Ethiopia	Drama	
J A N U A R Y	18	Bad Land: Road to Fury	Director: Jake Paltrow; Cast: Nicholas Hoult, Elle Fanning, Michael Shannon, Kodi Smit-McPhee	Screen Media Films	South Africa	Action; Science Fiction	
F E B R U A R Y	7	Two Men in Town	Director: Rachid Bouchareb; Cast: Forest Whitaker, Harvey Keitel, Ellen Burstyn, Luis Guzmán, Brenda Blethyn	Artists & Co; Remake of Deux hommes dans la ville (1973)	Algeria	Drama	
F E B R U A R Y	14	Devil in the Detail	Director: Shirley Frimpong-Manso; Cast: Nse Ikpe Etim, Adjetey Anang, Ecow Smith-Asante, Ama Ampofo	Sparrow Production	Ghana	Romance; Thriller	
M A R C H	7	Apaye	Directors: Desmond Elliot, Niyi Akinmolayan; Cast: Kanayo O. Kanayo, Mbong Amata, Belinda Effah, Clarion Chukwura	Emem Isong Productions	Nigeria	Biography; Drama	
M A R C H	9	Vessel	Director: Diana Whitten; Cast: Rebecca Gomperts	Filmbuff	Tanzania	Documentary	
M A R C H	28	Render to Caesar	Directors: Desmond Ovbiagele, Onyekachi Ejim; Cast: Wale Ojo, Gbenga Akinnagbe, Omoni Oboli, Bimbo Manuel	Mighty Man Entertainment	Nigeria	Crime; Thriller	
A P R I L	4	Island of Lemurs: Madagascar	Director: David Douglas; Cast: Morgan Freeman	Warner Bros.	Madagascar	Documentary	
A P R I L	17	Virunga	Director: Orlando von Einsiedel	Netflix	Republic of the Congo	Documentary	
A P R I L	18	Knocking on Heaven's Door	Director: Desmond Elliot; Cast: Ini Edo, Emem Isong	Royal Arts Academy	Nigeria	Musical; Romance; Drama	
M A Y	15	Timbuktu	Director: Abderrahmane Sissako; Cast: Abel Jafri, Hichem Yacoubi	Cohen Media Group	Mauritania	Drama	
M A Y	17	Run	Director: Philippe Lacôte; Cast: Abdoul Karim Konaté	Bac Films	Ivory Coast	Drama	
M A Y	17	The Salvation	Director: Kristian Levring; Cast: Mads Mikkelsen, Eva Green, Eric Cantona, Mikael Persbrandt, Jeffrey Dean Morgan, Jonathan Pryce, Michael Raymond-James	Nordisk Film	South Africa	Western	
M A Y	29	Make a Move	Director: Niyi Akinmolayan; Cast: Ivie Okujaye, Tina Mba, Beverly Naya, Wale Adebayo	Avizzle Productions	Nigeria	Dance; Musical	
J U N E	1	Being Mrs Elliot	Director: Omoni Oboli; Cast: Majid Michel, Omoni Oboli, Ayo Makun, Sylvia Oluchy, Seun Akindele, Uru Eke, Lepacious Bose	Dioni Visions	Nigeria	Romance; Comedy	
J U L Y	3	Desert Dancer	Director: Richard Raymond; Cast: Reece Ritchie, Freida Pinto, Nazanin Boniadi, Tom Cullen, Marama Corlett, Akin Gazi	Relativity Media; Based on the life of Afshin Ghaffarian	Morocco	Biography; Drama	
J U L Y	20	Veve	Director: Simon Mukali; Cast: Lowri Odhiambo, Emo Rugene, Lizz Njagah		Kenya	Drama	
J U L Y	22	Aussie Rules the World	Director: Michael Stringer McIntyre; Cast: Brett Kirk, Andrew Demetriou, Kevin Sheedy, Mike Sheahan, Peter FitzSimons, Paul Roos, Bachar Houli, John Longmire, David Wenham, Tadhg Kennelly, Adam Goodes	Second Nature Films	South Africa	Documentary; Sport	
J U L Y	28	The Blue Elephant	Director: Marwan Hamed; Cast: Karim Abdel Aziz, Khaled El Sawy, Nelly Karim, Mohamed Mamdouh, Dareen Haddad, Sherin Reda, Mohamed Shahin, Lebleba	Arabia Cinema Production & Distribution	Egypt	Drama	
A U G U S T	2	Dry	Director: Stephanie Linus; Cast: Stephanie Okereke, Liz Benson, William McNamara, Darwin Shaw, Olu Jacobs, Paul Sambo	Silverbird Film Distribution	Nigeria	Drama	
A U G U S T	11	The Giver	Director: Phillip Noyce; Cast: Brenton Thwaites, Odeya Rush Jeff Bridges, Meryl Streep, Alexander Skarsgård, Katie Holmes, Cameron Monaghan, Taylor Swift	The Weinstein Company; Based on The Giver by Lois Lowry	South Africa	Science Fiction; Drama	
A U G U S T	15	Hector and the Search for Happiness	Director: Peter Chelsom; Cast: Simon Pegg, Toni Collette, Rosamund Pike, Stellan Skarsgård, Jean Reno, Christopher Plummer	Koch Media; Based on Hector and the Search for Happiness by François Lelord	South Africa	Comedy; Drama	
A U G U S T	24	Twilight of Shadows	Director: Mohammed Lakhdar-Hamina; Cast: Samir Boitard		Algeria	Drama	
S E P T E M B E R	5	Beats of the Antonov	Director: Hajooj Kuka		South Africa; Sudan	Documentary	
S E P T E M B E R	5	Stories of Our Lives	Director: Jim Chuchu; Cast: Kelly Gichohi, Paul Ogola, Tim Mutungi, Mugambi Nthiga, Rose Njenga, Janice Mugo, Allan Weku, Maina Olwenya, Louis Brooke, Judy Gichohi	The NEST Collective	Kenya; South Africa	Drama	
S E P T E M B E R	6	Impunity	Director: Jyoti Mistry; Cast: Francis Chouler		South Africa	Thriller	
S E P T E M B E R	7	The Good Lie	Director: Philippe Falardeau; Cast: Reese Witherspoon, Arnold Oceng, Ger Duany, Emmanuel Jal, Corey Stoll, Sarah Baker, Kuoth Wiel	Warner Bros. Pictures	Kenya	Drama	
S E P T E M B E R	13	Outpost 37	Director: Jabbar Raisani; Cast: Adrian Paul, Reiley McClendon, Rick Ravanello	IFC Films	South Africa	Science Fiction; Action; Thriller	
S E P T E M B E R	27	Eyes of a Thief	Director: Najwa Najjar; Cast: Khaled Abol Naga		Algeria	Drama	
O C T O B E R	1	October 1	Director: Kunle Afolayan; Cast: Sadiq Daba, Kayode Olaiya, David Bailie, Kehinde Bankole, Kanayo O. Kanayo, Fabian Adeoye Lojede, Nick Rhys, Kunle Afolayan, Femi Adebayo, Bimbo Manuel, Ibrahim Chatta, Demola Adedoyin, Deola Sagoe	Golden Effects Pictures	Nigeria	Thriller	
O C T O B E R	9	Dazzling Mirage	Director: Tunde Kelani; Cast: Kemi 'Lala' Akindoju, Kunle Afolayan, Bimbo Manuel, Yomi Fash Lanso, Taiwo Ajai-Lycett, Seun Akindele	Mainframe Film and Television Productions; Based on Dazzling Mirage by Olayinka Abimbola Egbokhare	Nigeria	Drama	
O C T O B E R	9	Northmen: A Viking Saga	Director: Claudio Fäh; Cast: Tom Hopper, Ryan Kwanten, Ken Duken, Charlie Murphy, Ed Skrein, Anatole Taubman, Leo Gregory, James Norton, Darrell D'Silva, Johan Hegg, Danny Keogh	The Salt Company	South Africa	Historical; Action	
O C T O B E R	25	When Love Happens	Director: Seyi Babatope; Cast: Weruche Opia, OC Ukeje, Beverly Naya, Oreka Godis, Gideon Okeke, Bukky Wright, Desmond Elliot, Wale Ojo	FilmOne Distribution	Nigeria	Romance; Comedy	
O C T O B E R	31	30 Days in Atlanta	Director: Robert Peters; Cast: Ayo Makun, Ramsey Nouah, Richard Mofe Damijo, Desmond Elliot, Vivica A. Fox, Lynn Whitfield, Karlie Redd, Majid Michel, Omoni Oboli, Racheal Oniga, Yemi Blaq, Juliet Ibrahim		Nigeria	Romance; Comedy	
N O V E M B E R	7	Material of the Future	Director: Vern Moen; Cast: Alec Baldwin		Malawi	Documentary	
N O V E M B E R	11	Ojuju	Director: C.J. Obasi; Cast: Gabriel Afolayan, Omowunmi Dada, Kelechi Udegbe, Chidozie Nzeribe, Brutus Richard, Meg Otanwa, Paul Utomi	Fiery Film	Nigeria	Horror; Thriller	
N O V E M B E R	14	A Place in the Stars	Director: Steve Gukas; Cast: Gideon Okeke, Segun Arinze, Matilda Obaseki, Yemi Blaq, Femi Branch, Dejumo Lewis	Silverbird Film Distribution	Nigeria	Crime; Thriller	
D E C E M B E R	14	The Sea Is Behind	Director: Hisham Lasri; Cast: Malek Akhmiss		Morocco	Drama	

== Minor Releases ==
Title	Director	Release date	Country	Genre
#standwithme	Patrick Moreau	13 November 2014 (USA)	Namibia	Documentary
17 share' Fouad	Ahmed Nabil		Egypt	Documentary
1994: The Bloody Miracle	Bert Haitsma		South Africa	Documentary
204: Getting Away with Murder	Warren Batchelor	24 October 2014 (South Africa)	South Africa	Documentary
35 Cows and a Kalashnikov	Oswald von Richthofen	10 May 2014 (Germany)	Republic of the Congo; Ethiopia	Documentary
3 Healthy Tons of Fun	Mike Hutchinson		South Africa	Documentary
3 Summits	Livio Bestulic		Morocco	Documentary
419	Eric Bartonio		Senegal	Drama
Abd El-Kader	Salem Brahimi	14 January 2014 (Algeria)	Algeria	Documentary
Abl Al Rabie	Ahmed Atef		Egypt	Drama
Abou Al Oureef	Nihad Shalabi	12 September 2014 (Egypt)	Egypt	Comedy
A Butterfly Space	Denise Dragiewicz		Malawi	Documentary
A Culture of Silence	Raouf J Jacob	14 November 2014 (USA)	Sierra Leone	Documentary
A Day in the Sun	Nerina Penzhorn		South Africa	Documentary
A Doctor of My Own: The First Medical Students of Namibia	Trisha Pasricha	11 May 2014 (USA)	Namibia	Documentary
Ady Gasy	Nantenaina Lova	8 April 2015 (France)	Madagascar	Documentary
África Abençoada	Aminata Embaló	30 October 2014 (Portugal)	Guinea-Bissau	Documentary
African Gothic	Gabriel Bologna	4 April 2014 (USA)	South Africa	Thriller
African Grandmothers Tribunal: Seeking Justice at the Frontlines of the AIDS Crisis	Neal Hicks		Swaziland; Uganda	Documentary
African Pride	Laura Fletcher		South Africa	Documentary
Agent 2000: Die Laksman	Stefan Nieuwoudt	28 March 2014 (South Africa)	South Africa	Adventure
Alles Wat Mal Is	Darrell Roodt	8 August 2014 (South Africa)	South Africa	Comedy
Al Makida	Ahmed Hassan	26 December 2014 (Egypt)	Egypt	Drama
Almondass	Emadeldin Elsayed		Egypt	Documentary
Al Mowaten Bors	Rami Gheit	1 October 2014 (Egypt)	Egypt	Comedy
Alnabatshy	Ismail Farouk	3 October 2014 (Egypt)	Egypt	Comedy
Ambaradan	Alberto Caffarelli	December 2014 (USA)	Ethiopia	Documentary
Ana Ana	Petr Lom	13 March 2014 (Netherlands)	Egypt	Documentary
A New Rhythm for Mozambique	Debora Silva		Mozambique	Documentary
Angel	Elvis Nkosi	7 January 2014 (South Africa)	South Africa	Drama
Animal Magnetism	Cybela Clare		South Africa	Documentary
Animal Park	Afea Afea	January 2014 (Argentina)	Republic of the Congo	Documentary
An Impossible Mission: Ivory Coast Elephant Rescue	Michael Booth		Ivory Coast	Documentary
Antar & Beesa	Mohamed El-Tahawy	28 July 2014 (Egypt)	Egypt	Comedy
Apartheid Voices in Black and White	Federico Marcello		South Africa	Documentary
A Place for Everyone	Hans Ulrich Goessl	July 2014 (Rwanda)	Rwanda	Documentary
A Question of Humanity	Heather Angel Chandler		Uganda	Documentary
Aria Delma	Ahmed Baidou	10 February 2014 (Morocco)	Morocco	
A Snake Gives Birth to a Snake	Michael Lessac	July 2014 (South Africa)	Rwanda; South Africa	Documentary
A Tale of Two Revolutions	Nadim Fetaih		Egypt	Documentary
Atlantic.	Jan-Willem van Ewijk	7 December 2014 (Morocco)	Morocco	Drama
A Tribute to the Frontline States	Mandy Jacobson	20 July 2014 (South Africa)	South Africa	Documentary
Avevo Bisogno Dell'Oceano	Gianluca Peretti		Morocco	Documentary
A Visit to Remember: Roger Federer Foundation	Cris Saur		Zambia	Documentary
Backup Butembo	Martijn Dhaene	March 2014 (Belgium)	Republic of the Congo	Documentary
Balogun	Sam Davis		Nigeria	Documentary
Bambitious	Okechukwu Oku	30 November 2014 (Nigeria)	Nigeria	Drama
Ba Ne Jek Mal	Sean Patrick Fahey	20 June 2014 (USA)	Sudan	Documentary
Barcelona Here We Stand	Linnea de la Chapelle		Ghana; South Africa	Documentary
Base Camp Germany	Jason Byrne		Mozambique	Documentary
Bashir's Vision	Daniel Roher		Uganda	Documentary
Bastards	Deborah Perkin	15 March 2014 (Greece)	Morocco	Documentary
BB Africa	Leslie Villiaume	9 December 2014 (Benin)	Benin	Documentary
Beading with Hope: Two Stories of Maasai Women	Jessica Beltman		Tanzania	Documentary
Beautiful Monster	Ejike Chinedu Obim	1 April 2014 (USA)	Nigeria	Drama
Beautiful Tree, Severed Roots	Kenny Mann	15 October 2014 (USA)	Kenya	Documentary
Beauty of the Mind	Okey-Zubelu Okoh	2014 (Nigeria)	Nigeria	Drama
Becky's Journey	Sine Plambech	September 2014 (Denmark)	Nigeria	Documentary
B'ella	Tawonga Taddja Nkhonjera	7 July 2014 (Czech Republic)	Malawi	Drama
Beti and Amare	Andy Siege	18 July 2015 (UK)	Ethiopia	Fantasy
Between Friends: Ithala	Zuko Nodada	July 2014 (South Africa)	South Africa	Comedy
Between the Devil and the Deep	Heinrich Dahms		South Africa	Documentary
Beyond the Walls	Gayle Embrey		Liberia	Documentary
Big Dream	Kelly Cox		Kenya	Documentary
Blessing	Connor Clerke		Kenya	Documentary
Bloody Ring	Iyke Odife	1 April 2014 (USA)	Nigeria	Drama
Blood Rivals Lion vs Buffalo: Buffalo Fortress	Graeme Duane	30 September 2014 (USA)	South Africa	Documentary
Bordering on Bad Behavior	Jac Mulder	July 2014 (South Africa)	South Africa	Action
Born to Win	Frans Cronjé	15 August 2014 (South Africa)	South Africa	Drama
Boulanoir	Hamid Zoughi	8 October 2014 (Morocco)	Morocco	Drama
Boyhood	Jonah Rosenthal	26 April 2014 (USA)	Kenya	Documentary
Bridging Worlds: The Life and Teachings of Rav Azriel Chaim Goldfein	David Sassoon	15 June 2014 (South Africa)	South Africa	Documentary
Cairo Time	Amir Ramses	22 January 2015 (Kuwait)	Egypt	Comedy
Calabash	Gerardo Chapa		South Africa	Documentary
Carpe Kilimanjaro: An Alzheimer's Project	Zach Jordan		Kenya; Tanzania	Documentary
Casablanca Calling	Rosa Rogers	September 2014 (USA)	Morocco	Documentary
Ce qu'il reste de la folie	Joris Lachaise	October 2014 (Reunion)	Senegal	Documentary
Certifiée Halal	Mahmoud Zemmouri	13 May 2015 (France)	Algeria	Comedy
Change, Orphans In the Storm	David Bartlett		Cameroon; Liberia; Togo	Documentary
Changing the Game	Shilpi Gupta		South Africa	Documentary
Children of Dictators - An Eye for an Eye Would Make the Whole World Blind	Eszter Cseke		Uganda	Documentary
Children of the Genocide	Nina Milligan		Rwanda	Documentary
Children of the Light	Dawn Gifford Engle	8 June 2014 (USA)	South Africa	Documentary
Chop My Money	Theo Anthony	7 September 2014 (Canada)	Cameroon	Documentary
Cinema Chkoupi	Bahia Allouache	10 October 2014 (Algeria)	Algeria	Comedy
City of Dust	Young G. Kim	2014 (Uganda)	Uganda	Drama
City of Sounds	Janek Romero		Egypt	Documentary
Close	Esther de Rothschild	(III)	South Africa	Documentary
Close Call on Kilimanjaro with Martina Navratilova	Stefan Zeiner		Tanzania	Documentary
Conquering Kilimanjaro	Marc Middleton	October 2014 (USA)	Tanzania	Documentary
Copts Island	Ahmed Rashwan	23 May 2014 (United Arab Emirates)	Egypt	Documentary
Crumbs: Toppling the Bread Cartel	Dante Greeff	June 2014 (South Africa)	South Africa	Documentary
Cry for Help	Andrea Praxmarer		Sudan	Documentary
Cut the Tall Trees: The Killing Power of Words	Noah Bennett		Rwanda	Documentary
Dallas	Ali El Mejboud		Morocco	Comedy
Dancing Like Home	Joyce Guy	12 February 2014 (USA)	Senegal	Documentary
Da Sean Caddy Show Documentary	S. Andrew Linzy		Egypt; Ethiopia	Documentary
Daylight Come	Evan Vetter	11 October 2014 (USA)	Republic of the Congo	Documentary
Dead on Paper	Jessica Kelly		Egypt	Documentary
Decor	Ahmad Abdalla	18 September 2014 (Egypt)	Egypt	Drama
Deliverance	Lesley Braun	(II)	Republic of the Congo	Documentary
Deo	Ole Schell		Burundi	Documentary
Derrière les portes fermées	Mohamed Bensouda	15 January 2014 (Morocco)	Morocco	Drama
Devotional	Saverio Pesapane		Egypt	Documentary
Die Spook van Uniondale	Pierre Smith	29 August 2014 (South Africa)	South Africa	Romance
Die Windpomp	Etienne Fourie	25 April 2014 (South Africa)	South Africa	Drama
Documentary Film	Essam Esmail		Egypt	Documentary
Double-Cross	Pascal Aka	31 October 2014 (Ghana)	Ghana	Thriller
Dreamcycles	Nelson Roubert		Benin	Documentary
Dying/Living/Minutes	Hose B Jhesus		South Africa	Documentary
E18hteam	Juan Rodriguez-Briso	October 2014 (Spain)	Zambia	Documentary
Ebola Ambulance	Ben Solomon		Liberia	Documentary
Eco de Femmes	Carlotta Piccinini	October 2014 (Italy)	Morocco; Tunisia	Documentary
Ekei	Kang Quintus	August 2014 (USA)	Cameroon	Drama
Ek Joke Net 2	Stefan Nieuwoudt	1 May 2014 (South Africa)	South Africa	Comedy
Eighteam	Juan Rodriguez-Briso	15 October 2014 (Zambia)	Zambia	Documentary
El Dassas	Hany Hamdy		Egypt	Action
Elephant's Dream	Kristof Bilsen	4 July 2015 (UK)	Republic of the Congo	Documentary
El Gezira 2	Sherif ArafaIbrahim El-Batout	1 October 2014 (Egypt)	Egypt	Action
El Ghorya	Mohammed .Medo Refaee	1 January 2014 (Egypt)	Egypt	Documentary
El Harb El Alameya El Talta	Ahmed El Guindi	28 July 2014 (Egypt)	Egypt	Comedy
El-Mahragan	Hossam Elgohary	3 April 2014 (Kuwait)	Egypt	Drama
El Ott	Ibrahim El-Batout	27 October 2014 (United Arab Emirates)	Egypt	Mystery
El secreto del corazón	Oriol Gascón		Morocco	Drama
el Ziara	Nawfel Saheb-Ettaba		Algeria; Morocco; Tunisia	Drama
Endure	Vincent McEntee	(II)	Morocco	Documentary
Europe or Die	Urs Jakob		Senegal	Action
Excision	Victoria Vellopoulou	27 September 2014 (Greece)	Kenya	Documentary
Excuse My French	Amr Salama	22 January 2014 (Egypt)	Egypt	Comedy
Extended Essence	Anna Van Heerden	1 March 2014 (South Africa)	South Africa	Documentary
Extending Sweetness	Chloé Frommer		Zimbabwe	Documentary
Extingish the Blaze	Lesego Lediga		South Africa	Documentary
Faaji Agba	Remi Vaughan-Richards		Nigeria	Documentary
Faan se trein	Koos Roets	24 January 2014 (South Africa)	South Africa	Drama
Fadhma N'Soumer	Belkacem Hadjadj	15 October 2014 (Algeria)	Algeria	Historical
Famadihana (Second Burial): Surviving Guilt and Grief	Jacques Randrianary	8 February 2014 (USA)	Madagascar	Documentary
Family Goldmine	Robbie Fraser	9 November 2014 (Denmark)	Mali	Documentary
Family Secrets	Hany Fawzi	2014 (Egypt)	Egypt	Drama
Far from Home: Uganda to the Tetons	Galen Knowles	October 2014 (USA)	Uganda	Documentary
Fellahin			Egypt; Tunisia	Documentary
First to Fall	Rachel Beth Anderson	9 June 2014 (Italy)	Libya	Documentary
Follow the Zebra	Philippe Brunot	May 2014 (Thailand)	Kenya; Tanzania	Documentary
Formatage	Mourad El Khaoudi	12 February 2014 (Morocco)	Morocco	Drama
Fort Buchanan	Benjamin Crotty	3 June 2015 (France)	Tunisia	Comedy
From Brooklyn to Africa: Hope and Kalongo	Cesar Hernandez		Uganda	Documentary
From Trauma to Peace	Jo Danieli		Rwanda	Documentary
Gannets: The Wrong Side of the Run	Graeme Duane		South Africa	Documentary
Gardeners of Eden	Austin Peck	24 April 2015 (USA)	Kenya	Documentary
Gates of the Sun	Jean-Marc Minéo	18 March 2015 (Algeria)	Algeria]	Action
Gawazah Miri	Wael Ihsan	28 August 2014 (Kuwait)	Egypt	Comedy
Ghosts' Stories: Discussions with Tanzanian Albinos and Their Advocates	Sarah Hall		Tanzania	Documentary
Giran el-Sa'd	Tamer Basyuni	22 May 2014 (Kuwait)	Egypt	Comedy
GirlZtalk	Christina Vestey		South Africa	Documentary
Give to Live the Movie	Justin de Leon		Kenya; Tanzania	Documentary
Gloria Jesus	Xavier Nellens	2014 (USA)	Morocco	Comedy
Glory Game: The Joost van der Westhuizen Story	Odette Schwegler	August 2014 (South Africa)	South Africa	Documentary
God Is Not Working on Sunday, Eh!	Leona Goldstein		Rwanda	Documentary
Gold Is Here	David Asare Masterwille	11 April 2014 (Ghana)	Ghana	Documentary
Graines de grenades	Abdellah Toukouna	12 November 2014 (Morocco)	Morocco	
Great White Shark Legend	Rachel Lacombe	June 2014 (South Africa)	South Africa	Documentary
Guitar Madagascar	Takeshi Kamei		Madagascar	Documentary
Hamati Bithibbeni	Akram Farid	13 November 2014 (Kuwait)	Egypt	Comedy
Hanged for Love	Richard Mulindwa	26 December 2014 (Uganda)	Uganda	Drama
Hard to Get	Zee Ntuli	29 August 2014 (South Africa)	South Africa	Action
Herma, xxy intersex	Melanie Pelletier Poirier		South Africa	Documentary
Himba & Damara of Namibia: Cultures at the Edge	Barbara Sandick		Namibia	Documentary
Hippo vs Croc	Graeme Duane		South Africa	Documentary
Hit the Road: Cheku Tanzania	Lara Kroeker		Tanzania	Documentary
Hmong Foodways	David Nibbs		Uganda	Documentary
Hope in Darkness	Ely Bam's		Republic of the Congo	Documentary
Home in Time for War	Mikael Taib		Libya	Documentary
Horn	Reina-Marie Loader	May 2014 (South Africa)	South Africa	Documentary
Horra	Moez Kamoun	11 March 2015 (Tunisia)	Tunisia	Drama
Housewife in the Heart of Darkness	James Kenney		Republic of the Congo	Documentary
Howa Fi Keda	Hosny Saleh	2 January 2014 (Kuwait)	Egypt	Drama
Hustlers	Elvis Chuks	13 January 2014 (Nigeria)	Nigeria	Drama
I Am Kizito	Mike Mapes		Rwanda	Documentary
I Am the People	Anna Roussillon	24 October 2014 (Czech Republic)	Egypt	Documentary
Ibyiza Birimbere: The Best Is Still to Come	Soenke C. Weiss		Rwanda	Documentary
If You Take This	Craig Butta	17 June 2014 (USA)	Morocco	Documentary
IJspaard	Elan Gamaker	1 November 2015 (Belgium)	South Africa	Drama
Il Mare	Guido Nicol	November 2014 (Italy)	Togo	Documentary
I Love Kuduro	Mário Patrocínio	18 September 2014 (Portugal)	Angola	Drama
I Married My Family's Killer	Emily Kassie	17 November 2014 (USA)	Rwanda	Documentary
I'm Dead	Yacine Benelhadj	December 2014 (United Arab Emirates)	Algeria	Drama
I'm Not Leaving	Kevin Ekvall		Rwanda	Documentary
In the Shadow of Ebola	Gregg Mitman		Liberia	Documentary
Intore	Eric Kabera	12 July 2014 (Rwanda)	Rwanda	Documentary
Invasion 1897	Lancelot Oduwa Imasuen	21 December 2014 (Nigeria)	Nigeria	Biography
It Never Rained on Rhodes	Barry Salzman		South Africa	Documentary
It's Not Over	Andrew Jenks	1 December 2014 (Belgium)	South Africa	Documentary
I've Seen the Unicorn	Vincent Chung Toi Wong	25 April 2014 (Canada)	Mauritius	Documentary
Iyore	Frank Rajah Arase		Nigeria	Drama
Jenseits von schwarz und weiß - Mission in Sambia;;	Christoph Hertel	21 September 2014 (Germany)	Zambia	Documentary
Jesus was here	Mohammed Khairy		Egypt	Documentary
Jews of Egypt: The End of a Journey	Amir Ramses	3 June 2014 (Egypt)	Egypt	Documentary
Jikoo, a wish	Leroy Christophe		Senegal	Documentary
Joe	Erica Hill		Uganda	Documentary
John of God the Movie	Selé M'Poko		Democratic Republic of the Congo	Comedy
Journey of Rising Hopes	Brett Garling	20 April 2014 (Netherlands)	Tanzania	Documentary
Kalanda: The Knowledge of the Bush	Lorenzo Ferrarini		Burkina Faso	Documentary
Kalushi: The Story of Solomon Mahlangu	Mandla Dube	31 October 2014 (South Africa)	South Africa	
Kanyamakan	Said C. Naciri	12 March 2014 (Morocco)	Morocco	Action
Kawomera: Plant, Pray Partner for Peace with Subtitles	Marla Mossman	TV Short May 2014	Uganda	Documentary
Kenya - Senior Project	Wesley McHaley		Kenya	Documentary
Khetet Jimmy	Mary Badir	29 January 2014 (Egypt)	Egypt	Comedy
Khuttat Gimi	Tamer Basyuni	6 February 2014 (Kuwait)	Egypt	Comedy
Kibuki: Spirits in Zanzibar	Elizabeth Brooks		Tanzania	Documentary
Klankgrens	Eric Uys		South Africa	Documentary
Knysna	Andre Velts	24 December 2014 (South Africa)	South Africa	Comedy
Komian	Jordi Esteva		Ivory Coast	Documentary
Konfetti	Zaheer Bhyat	18 April 2014 (South Africa)	South Africa	Comedy
Kora	Jorge Correia Carvalho	19 October 2014 (Portugal)	Guinea-Bissau	Documentary
Kpians: The Feast of Souls	Stanlee Ohikhuare	September 2014 (Nigeria)	Nigeria	Action
Kung Fu Grandma	Jeong-One Park	16 May 2014 (Italy)	Kenya	Documentary
La Boheme	Mark Dornford-May		South Africa	Musical
La fille du rail	Eva Sehet	19 November 2014 (France)	Mali	Documentary
Lalla the Buddha	Dakini Shima		South Africa	Documentary
La mort du Dieu serpent	Damien Froidevaux	12 August 2014 (Switzerland)	Senegal	Documentary
L'anniversaire	Latif Lahlou	14 May 2014 (Morocco)	Morocco	
Living Hope	David Kiern	23 February 2014 (USA)	South Africa	Documentary
La souffrance est une école de sagesse	Ariane Astrid Atodji	23 August 2014 (France)	Democratic Republic of the Congo	Documentary
La vie pure	Jeremy Banster	25 November 2015 (France)	Guinea	Adventure
La villa rouge	Boubakar Diallo	3 February 2014 (Burkina Faso)	Burkina Faso	Thriller
Leading Lady	Henk Pretorius	9 October 2015 (UK)	South Africa	Comedy
L'éclat furtif de l'ombre	Patrick Dechesne	27 January 2014 (Netherlands)	Ethiopia	Drama
Le dernier mirage	Nidhal Chatta	19 February 2014 (Tunisia)	Tunisia	Thriller
Legalization of Hashish in Morocco	Mehdi El Idrissi	12 April 2014 (Morocco)	Morocco	Documentary
Le jardin d'Ewald	Alexandra Pille		Senegal	Documentary
Les enfants de la périphérie	Gilde Razafitsihadinoina	1 February 2014 (France)	Madagascar	Documentary
Let's Get the Rhythm: the Life and Times of Miss Mary Mack	Irene Chagall	TV movie May 2014	Sierra Leone	Documentary
Let Them Eat Cake	Alexis Krasilovsky	17 January 2014 (Bangladesh)	Guinea; Kenya; Somalia	Documentary
Let Them Eat Cake - Director's Cut	Alexis Krasilovsky	20 July 2014 (India)	Guinea; Kenya; Somalia	Documentary
Life After Death	Joe Callander	February 2014 (USA)	Rwanda	Documentary
Living on the Edge of Disaster: Climate's Human Cost	Davis Coombe	March 2014 (USA)	Burkina Faso	Documentary
Loafers	Olga Pirkovskaya		Guinea	Documentary
Lonbraz Kann	David Constantin	October 2014 (Belgium)	Mauritius	Drama
Looking for Muhyiddin	Nacer Khemir	14 April 2014 (Morocco)	Tunisia	Drama
L'orchestre des aveugles	Mohamed Mouftakir		Morocco	Drama
Los dioses de agua	Pablo César	21 November 2014 (India)	Angola; Ethiopia	Adventure
Love the One You Love	Jenna Cato Bass	July 2014 (South Africa)	South Africa	Comedy
Low Cost Flocks	Giacomo Agnetti		Egypt; Kenya	Documentary
Maasai 10th Lost Tribe of Israel	Dante Tanikie-Montagnani	10 August 2014 (UK)	Kenya	Documentary
Madagascar: une belle vie, une belle mort	Riccardo Bononi		Madagascar	Documentary
Maison Pour La Vie	Theo Anthony		Republic of the Congo	Documentary
Making Waves	Alice McDowell		Gambia; South Africa	Documentary
Malek Means Angel	Lea Hjort Mathiesen		Tunisia	Documentary
Mandela: The Death of an Icon	Marion Edmunds	2014 (South Africa)	South Africa	Documentary
Man Up and Go	Randy Bacon	October 2014 (USA)	Ethiopia; Uganda	Documentary
Mapa emocional de Tánger	José Ramón Da Cruz	5 November 2014 (Spain)	Morocco	Documentary
Maputo - A low budget dream	Mario Martinazzi	May 2014 (Italy)	Mozambique	Documentary
March of the Gods: Botswana Metalheads	Raffaele Mosca	21 August 2014 (UK)	Botswana	Documentary
Matter Out of Place	Arin Crumley		South Africa	Documentary
Matt Shepard Is a Friend of Mine	Michele Josue	6 February 2015 (USA)	Morocco	Documentary
Mbeti: Road to Kisesini	Ann Bromberg	May 2014 (USA)	Kenya	Documentary
Mbeu Yosintha	Colin Stevens		Malawi	Drama
Mercy	Angus Duncan	14 February 2014 (South Africa)	South Africa	Drama
Message from Under the Sea	Mahmoud Hasan	5 June 2014 (Syria)	Egypt	Documentary
Miners Shot Down	Rehad Desai	30 May 2014 (South Africa)	South Africa	Documentary
Mohammed VI, la dynamique du Maroc	Youssef Britel	10 November 2014 (Morocco)	Morocco	Documentary
Monrovia on Fire	Nick Masao	28 February 2014 (Liberia)	Liberia	Action
Mood	Mahmoud Yossry		Egypt	Documentary
Morbayassa	Cheick Fantamady Camara	6 May 2014 (France)	Guinea	
Morning After Dark	Ejike Chinedu Obim	15 April 2014 (USA)	Nigeria	Drama
Mount Aureol	Felix Bazalgette		Sierra Leone	Documentary
Mu Buzima	Andrew Kayongo	30 January 2014 (Rwanda)	Rwanda	Drama
Mum, Dad, Meet Sam	Tony Sebastian Ukpo	6 December 2014 (UK)	Nigeria	Comedy
Mummy Busi	Iris Lebrun		South Africa	Documentary
Musafir	Danny Bedrossian		Kenya	Documentary
My African Home	Carley Andrews		Tanzania	Documentary
My Name Is Dieme	Jonathan Hyams		Republic of the Congo; Uganda	Documentary
My Room at the Centre of the Universe	Guy Spiller		South Africa	Documentary
Mystical Traveler	Jsu Garcia	4 July 2014 (USA)	Morocco	Documentary
Nada's Gift	Laurel A. Adler		Egypt	Documentary
Nada's Revolution	Cláudia Lisboa		Egypt	Documentary
National Diploma	Dieudo Hamadi	September 2014 (Canada)	Republic of the Congo	Documentary
Ndege Ndogo Little Bird	Mathieu Mazza	July 2014 (USA)	Algeria; Chad; Kenya	Documentary
Nelson Mandela Redrawn	Brett Lotriet Best	18 July 2014 (UK)	South Africa	Documentary
Never a Neverland	Ricky Norris	23 February 2014 (USA)	Swaziland	Documentary
Next Adventure	Taylor Phillips		Kenya	Documentary
Night Is Coming: Threnody for the Victims of Marikana	Aryan Kaganof	3 May 2014 (Germany)	South Africa	Documentary
Not Heading To Montauk	Alastair Clayton		Uganda	Documentary
Not on My Watch	Sarah Doody	2 October 2014 (South Africa)	South Africa	Documentary
Obaapa Nisuo	Nana Wiafe Akenten II	13 September 2014 (USA)	Ghana	Drama
Ocean Consciousness	Fayolle Jean Francois Cedric		Mauritius	Documentary
Om Amira	Naji Ismail		Egypt	Documentary
On Any Sunday: The Next Chapter	Dana Brown	September 2014 (Spain)	South Africa	Documentary
On Beauty	Joanna Rudnick	24 July 2015 (USA)	Kenya	Documentary
Once Upon a Road Trip	David Moore		South Africa	Adventure
One	Sue Vicory	(IV)	South Africa; Swaziland	Documentary
One Couch at a Time	Alexandra Liss	16 July 2014 (USA)	Morocco; Zimbabwe	Documentary
One Humanity	Mickey Madoda Dube	14 September 2014 (UK)	South Africa	Documentary
Orange Blossom	Margaux Guillemard		Morocco	Documentary
Orbis	Simon Wood	June 2014 (South Africa)	South Africa	Documentary
Origins	Will Parrinello		Tanzania	Documentary
Origins: Black Coffee	Patrick Nation		South Africa	Documentary
Out of the Ordinary	Daoud Abdel Sayed	14 December 2014 (United Arab Emirates)	Egypt	Drama
Out of Order	Mahmoud Kamel	(III)	Egypt	Crime
Pad na jou hart	Jaco Smit	14 February 2014 (South Africa)	South Africa	Adventure
Painted Lies	Okey Ifeanyi	1 April 2014 (USA)	Nigeria	Drama
Painting Cape Town	Katey Lee Carson	July 2014 (South Africa)	South Africa	Documentary
Palace War	Iyke Odife	1 April 2014 (USA)	Nigeria	Drama
Patterns of Evidence: The Exodus	Tim Mahoney	19 January 2015 (USA)	Egypt	Documentary
Peace in Our Pockets	Kenny Dalsheimer		Kenya	Documentary
Petits nettoyages	Éliane de Latour		Ivory Coast	Documentary
Pirates of Sale	Rosa Rogers		Morocco	Documentary
Pirating Pirates	David Calek	October 2014 (Czech Republic)	Kenya; Somalia	Documentary
Playing a Part	Lauren Rothman		Rwanda	Documentary
Poems from Future Architects	Alex Macinnis		Rwanda	Documentary
Poverty, Inc.	Michael Matheson Miller	11 November 2014 (UK)	Ethiopia; Kenya; Rwanda; South Africa; Swaziland	Documentary
Power Lines	Damien Stankiewicz	(I)	Morocco	Documentary
Power of Play	Lauren Anders Brown	(I)	Liberia	Documentary
Priscilla's Legacy	Thomalind Martin Polite	March 2014 (USA)	Sierra Leone	Documentary
Project 51	Nakul Mohur	29 June 2014 (Mauritius)	Mauritius	Documentary
Project Daniel	Mick Ebeling		South Africa; Sudan	Documentary
Quitte le pouvoir	Aida Grovestins	August 2014 (Netherlands)	Senegal	Documentary
Rabbin Hood		March 2014 (France)	Morocco	Documentary
Rabbit Hole: A Musical Journey with Matt Vend and Brett Newski	Pascal Bennett		South Africa	Documentary
Railway Hotel Bamako	Faramarz Beheshti		Mali	Documentary
Raise Up: The World is Our Gym	B. Rain Bennett		Equatorial Guinea; Uganda	Documentary
RCA, retour à nulle part	Alfredo Torrescalles	5 April 2014 (Spain)	Cameroon	Documentary
Reaching the peak: Mount Elgon National Park	Stuart Cohen	November 2014 (Australia)	Uganda	Documentary
Red	James Cairns	March 2014 (South Africa)	South Africa	Documentary
Reeva: The Model You Thought You Knew	Karyn Maughan	12 February 2014 (South Africa)	South Africa	Documentary
Remaining Days	Alex Koryakin		Uganda	Documentary
REVOLUTION in REVERSE: Debt & Work - the New Colonialism	Chiara Cavallazzi	2 October 2014 (Brazil)	Egypt; Guinea	Documentary
Right to Play	Kristin Gladney		South Africa	Documentary
Roger Ballen's Asylum of the Birds	Ben Jay Crossman		South Africa	Documentary
Rouh's Beauty	Sameh Abdelaziz	3 April 2014 (Egypt)	Egypt	Drama
Run Jose	Dave Meinert		South Africa	Documentary
Running Free	Magnus Borka Kloster-Jensen	January 2014 (Norway)	Morocco	Documentary
Run or Die	Eugene Koekemoer	19 November 2014 (South Africa)	South Africa	Thriller
Rwanda, Life Goes On	Benoît Dervaux		Rwanda	Documentary
Saga, l'histoire des hommes qui ne reviennent jamais	Othman Naciri	19 February 2014 (Morocco)	Morocco	Drama
Salem abu ukhtuh	Muhammad Hamdi	1 May 2014 (Kuwait)	Egypt	Comedy
Sally: Behind the Smile	Ethan McLean		South Africa	Documentary
Secret Act	Nonso Emekaekwue	1 April 2014 (USA)	Nigeria	Thriller
Secret Weapon	Nonso Emekaekwue	1 April 2014 (USA)	Nigeria	Thriller
Seun: Son	Darrell Roodt	1 December 2014 (South Africa)	South Africa	Drama
Sexy Money	Karin Junger	3 April 2014 (Netherlands)	Nigeria	Documentary
Shadow & Light	Hakim Ben Aissia	17 March 2014 (Tunisia)	Tunisia	Documentary
Shield and Spear	Petter Ringbom	12 June 2014 (UK)	South Africa	Documentary
Shower of Love	Matthew F. Smith		Kenya	Documentary
Sigauque	Abu Gudo	17 December 2014 (Mozambique)	Mozambique	Documentary
Sightlines	Genevieve Bicknell	June 2014 (UK)	Kenya	Documentary
Simha	Jerome Blumberg		Central African Republic	Documentary
Simo Gabid: Are You Ready?	Lars Sundgot Slagsvold		Morocco	Documentary
Six Lives: A Cinepoem	Sarah Riggs		Morocco	Documentary
Slum Dreams	Brendan Modini		Kenya	Documentary
Soft Vengeance: Albie Sachs and the New South Africa	Abby Ginzberg	18 September 2014 (USA)	South Africa	Documentary
Softwaring Hard	Alex Pop	31 October 2014 (Canada)	South Africa; Uganda	Documentary
Sone'a Fee Misr	Amr Salama	28 July 2014 (Egypt)	Egypt	Comedy
Sons of Africa	James Becket	26 April 2014 (USA)	Tanzania	Documentary
Spirit Creatures: Niassa's Invisible Realm	Keith Begg	18 April 2014 (USA)	South Africa	Documentary
Spring Queen	Paul Yule		South Africa	Documentary
Spud 3: Learning to Fly	John Barker	15 November 2014 (South Africa)	South Africa	Comedy
Steve's Dream	Robin Dianoux	1 February 2014 (France)	Kenya	Documentary
St Mary	Matthias Obahiagbon	8 August 2014 (Nigeria)	Nigeria	Documentary
Stolen Treasures	Obafemi Lasode	20 September 2014 (Nigeria)	Nigeria	Adventure
Stomp It Out	Rachel Dickinson		South Africa	Documentary
Stone Cold Jane Austen	Jon Savage	8 November 2014 (South Africa)	South Africa	Biography
Street Muse: Kenya	Meryl O'Connor	21 August 2014 (USA)	Kenya	Documentary
Suspended: On the Lightness of Stones	Brad Schaffer		South Africa	Documentary
Suurlemoen!	Vickus Strijdom	12 September 2014 (South Africa)	South Africa	Drama
Suzana 2	Mpawenimana Juma Jabibu	1 January 2014 (Burundi)	Burundi	Romance
Tahar Chériaa: A l'Ombre du Baobab	Mohamed Challouf	30 November 2014 (Tunisia)	Tunisia	Documentary
Tamaduni za Kusini	David Vee Rodden	15 September 2014 (China)	Tanzania	Documentary
Tawnza	Malika El Manoug	10 February 2014 (Morocco)	Morocco	Drama
TB: Return of the Plague	Jezza Neumann	TV movie 2014	Swaziland	Documentary
TB Unmasked	Joshua Weinstein	1 November 2014 (USA)	South Africa	Documentary
Tchitundu-Hulu Rock Art	Rina Sherman	Video 21 March 2014	Angola	Documentary
Ten Year Tightrope: Rebels with a Cause	Mandy Jacobson	21 September 2014 (South Africa)	South Africa	Documentary
The AC Project: To the Ends of the Earth	Brandon Lied		Botswana; Burundi; Rwanda; South Africa; Uganda; Zambia	Documentary
The Actor	Aidan Whytock	(I)	South Africa	Drama
The Algerian	Giovanni Zelko	7 August 2015 (USA)	Algeria	Action
The Barefoot Artist	Glenn Holsten	2014 (USA)	Kenya; Rwanda	Documentary
The Boy from Geita	Vic Sarin	April 2014 (Canada)	Tanzania	Documentary
The Cape of Good Humor	Eric Nikolaus Kwasnjuk	June 2014 (South Africa)	South Africa	Documentary
The Children of Tyabala	Sylvain Leroux	November 2014 (USA)	Guinea	Documentary
The cow farm			Egypt	Documentary
The Cure for Homesickness	Gabrielle Menezes		Mali; Zimbabwe	Documentary
The Curse of Highway Sheila	Kumaran Naidu	14 November 2014 (South Africa)	South Africa	Thriller
The Dent	Basim Magdy	7 November 2014 (Denmark)	Egypt	Documentary
The Dickumentary	Sofian Khan	31 March 2015 (USA)	Egypt	Documentary
The Dream of Shahrazad	Francois Verster	28 November 2014 (Netherlands)	Egypt; South Africa	Documentary
The Drill Project	Justin Jay	1 April 2014 (USA)	Cameroon; Equatorial Guinea; Nigeria	Documentary
The Empire of the Scents	Kim Nguyen	November 2014 (Canada)	Morocco	Documentary
The End of Egypt or The Brotherhood	Sayed Badreya	4 February 2014 (USA)	Egypt	Documentary
The Football Effect	Evan McAuliffe	TV movie 24 June 2014	South Africa	Documentary
The Foreign Minister	Mandy Jacobson	5 October 2014 (South Africa)	South Africa	Documentary
The Gate of Departure	Karim Hanafy	11 November 2014 (Egypt)	Egypt	Biography
The Gospel of John	David Batty	14 August 2015 (Germany)	Morocco	Drama
The Guardians	Andy Maser		Namibia	Documentary
The Hustler	Jon Kasbe		Kenya	Documentary
The Ibogaine Safari	Pierre le Roux	4 March 2014 (South Africa)	South Africa	Documentary
The Intersection	Terence Mbulaheni	27 March 2014 (USA)	South Africa	Documentary
The Kindness of Strangers	Cole Kawana		Rwanda	Documentary
The Land Between	David Fedele	(I)	Morocco	Documentary
The Last Boers of Patagonia	Richard Finn Gregory	June 2014 (South Africa)	South Africa	Documentary
The Long March: A Dialogue Between Mohamed ElBaradei and Rajmohan Gandhi	Linda Herrera	2014 (Egypt)	Egypt	Documentary
The Lurker	Emadeldin Elsayed	31 May 2014 (Egypt)	Egypt	Documentary
The Man from Oran	Lyès Salem	19 November 2014 (France)	Algeria	Drama
The Narrow Frame of Midnight	Tala Hadid	September 2014 (Canada)	Morocco	Drama
The Orchard Keepers	Bryony Dunne	January 2015 (UK)	Egypt	Documentary
The Other Man: F.W. de Klerk and the End of Apartheid	Nicolas Rossier	6 February 2015 (USA)	South Africa	Documentary
The Perfect Wave	Bruce Macdonald	28 February 2014 (South Africa)	South Africa	Adventure
The Philosopher and the Faithful	Dejardin Marjory		Senegal	Documentary
The Power of Knowing: Experiences of Youth and Caregivers Around Pediatric HIV Disclosure	Robert Inglis	7 March 2014 (South Africa)	South Africa	Documentary
The Return	Neveen Shalaby	December 2014 (India)	Egypt	Documentary
The Return of the Killer Bride	Preshanthan Moodley	6 September 2014 (South Africa)	South Africa	Horror
The Rhythm of Healing	Imani Cook-Gist		Rwanda	Documentary
The Rhythm of Time			Algeria	Documentary
The Rwandan Genocide: Reunited Through Polaroids	Colin Crowley		Rwanda	Documentary
The Salima Project	Kelly Bumford		Malawi	Documentary
The Sea Turtles of Lamu	D. David Morin		Kenya	Documentary
The Shore Break	Ryley Grunenwald	22 November 2014 (Netherlands)	South Africa	Documentary
The Supreme Price	Joanna Lipper	April 2014 (UK)	Nigeria	Documentary
The Two of Us	Ernest Nkosi	31 July 2015 (South Africa)	South Africa	Drama
The UWC Spirit	Andrés Broennimann		Swaziland	Documentary
The Vula Connection	Marion Edmunds	2014 (South Africa)	South Africa	Documentary
The Wandering Muse	Tamas Wormser	November 2014 (Canada)	Morocco; Uganda	Documentary
The Week Mandela Died - A Rainbow Nation Drifting Apart?	Beatus Buchzik	27 April 2014 (France)	South Africa	Documentary
The World They Knew	Jason Lemon		Gambia	Documentary
They Are We	Emma Christopher	2014 (Australia)	Liberia; Sierra Leone	Documentary
Think About It	John Kaylin	1 July 2014 (Italy)	Sudan	Documentary
This Is Not Happening	Ewan Thomas	2 July 2015 (UK)	Morocco	Drama
Three Stones for Jean Genet	Frieder Schlaich	February 2014 (Germany)	Morocco	Documentary
Tinghir	Aisha Jabour		Morocco	Documentary
To Rise Again	Lancelot Oduwa Imasuen	1 April 2014 (USA)	Nigeria	Drama
Tour	Millie Chen		Rwanda	Documentary
Township Lessons from the Cape of Good Hope	Michael Fischer	26 August 2014 (UK)	South Africa	Documentary
Transito	José Antonio Hernández Martínez		Morocco	Documentary
Travelling at Night with Jim Jarmusch	Léa Rinaldi	16 June 2014 (France)	Morocco	Documentary
Trend Beacons	Örn Marino Arnarson	November 2014 (Denmark)	South Africa	Documentary
TrillZone	Nikhil Singh	31 July 2014 (South Africa)	South Africa	Thriller
Tripoli Stories: The Runner	Mohannad Eissa		Libya	Documentary
Tripoli Stories: The Sandwich Maker	Samer S. Omar		Libya	Documentary
To Be Destroyed	Ahmed Ateyya		Egypt	Documentary
Travailleuses...	Bouna Cherif Fofana	12 November 2014 (France)	Burkina Faso; Mali	Documentary
Tumaini Junior School: Hope for Karatu	Kellen Balla		Tanzania	Documentary
Turbulences	Daniel Kamwa		Cameroon; South Africa	Animation
Um Ghayeb	Nadine Salib	28 October 2014 (United Arab Emirates)	Egypt	Documentary
Um Ghayeb: Mother of the Unborn	Nadine Salib	6 June 2015 (UK)	Egypt	Documentary
Umudugudu! Rwanda 20 Ans Après	Giordano Cossu	November 2014 (UK)	Rwanda	Documentary
Uncomfortable Truth	Okey Ifeanyi	1 April 2014 (USA)	Nigeria	Drama
Unconditional Love	John Uche	2014 (USA)	Cameroon	Drama
Undefended_Feature	Mickaela Grace		Kenya	Drama
Under the Umbrella Tree	Lenny Lies	October 2014 (USA)	Uganda	Documentary
Unearthed	Jolynn Minnaar	2014 (South Africa)	South Africa	Documentary
Une simple parole	Khady Sylla	7 September 2014 (Canada)	Senegal	
Unforgiven: Rwanda	Lukas Augustin	30 April 2014 (Germany)	Rwanda	Documentary
Un jour à l'école	Victor Ghizaru	November 2014 (Netherlands)	Burkina Faso	Documentary
Veil of Silence	Habeeb Lawal	15 January 2014 (Nigeria)	Nigeria	Documentary
Verdict: The LaVena Johnson Murder Conspiracy	Stanlee Ohikhuare	July 2014 (Nigeria)	Nigeria	Documentary
Verlore	Andrus Strauss	1 May 2014 (South Africa)	South Africa	Thriller
Volcanic Planet	Peter Rowe	4 January 2014 (Canada)	Republic of the Congo	Documentary
Vrou soek boer	Maynard Kraak	7 March 2014 (South Africa)	South Africa	Romance
Walking with Lions	Ilze Vanmij	1 November 2014 (South Africa)	South Africa	Documentary
Wallbangers	Omar Sami Khodeir	30 September 2014 (Egypt)	Egypt	Documentary
Warda	Hadi El Bagoury	13 November 2014 (Egypt)	Egypt	Horror
Watchers of the Sky	Edet Belzberg	16 October 2015 (USA)	Chad; Rwanda	Documentary
Water to Tabato	Paulo Carneiro	25 October 2014 (Czech Republic)	Guinea-Bissau	Documentary
We Stand Alone	Aubrey Lethbridge	23 May 2014 (USA)	Liberia	Documentary
We were Rebels	Florian Schewe	May 2014 (Germany)	Sudan	Documentary
We Won't Stop	Lucia Zoro	December 2014 (UK)	Kenya	Documentary
Wheel of the World, One Woman's Creative Journey for Global Peace	Vijali Hamilton		Senegal	Documentary
When I Was Young I Said I Would Be Happy	Paul J. Lynch		Rwanda	Documentary
When Love Happens	Seyi Babatope	4 September 2015 (UK)	Nigeria	Romance
When Under Fire: Shoot Back!	Marc Wiese	27 September 2014 (Iceland)	South Africa	Documentary
Where the Road Runs Out	Rudolf Buitendach	26 September 2014 (USA)	Equatorial Guinea; South Africa	Drama
Where the Sun Sets	Colleen Cassingham		Morocco	Documentary
Willing to Break	Jp Keenan	April 2014 (USA)	Morocco	Documentary
With Love from Madagascar	Klara Harden		Madagascar	Documentary
Woman on Hold	Jessie Chisi	11 November 2014 (Denmark)	Zambia	Documentary
Women are the Change	Philip Lewis		Ethiopia; Malawi; Mozambique	Documentary
Women Building Peace	Colleen Wagner		Morocco; Rwanda; South Africa; Uganda	Documentary
Women on Walls		January 2015 (Sweden)	Egypt	Documentary
Wonderbroeders	Johan Timmers	2 October 2014 (Netherlands)	South Africa	Comedy
Xigodo the Hunter	Jack Davis		Mozambique	Documentary
Ya wooto	Jenny Cartwright		Burkina Faso	Documentary
You're Right About Left	Francesco Bori	Video 2 March 2014	Morocco	Documentary
Yugen	Bradshaw Schaffer		South Africa	Documentary
Yvone Kane	Margarida Cardoso	26 February 2015 (Portugal)	Mozambique	Documentary
Zawadi Ndogo: Small Gift	Margaret Corn		Malawi	Documentary
Zaynab, la rose d'Aghmat	Farida Bourquia	30 April 2014 (Morocco)	Morocco	
Zola	Sanelle Sibanda		Zimbabwe	Action

== Co-Productions ==
Rank	Country	Number	Films	Ref.
1	United States	11	30 Days in Atlanta, Aussie Rules the World, Bad Land: Road to Fury, Difret, Fishing Without Nets, Island of Lemurs: Madagascar, Material of the Future, The Giver, The Good Lie, Two Men in Town, Vessel	
2	United Kingdom	6	Desert Dancer, Dry, Hector and the Search for Happiness, Outpost 37, The Salvation, Virunga	
3	France	5	Eyes of a Thief, Run, The Sea Is Behind, Timbuktu, Two Men in Town	
4	Germany	4	Hector and the Search for Happiness, Material of the Future, Northmen: A Viking Saga, Veve	
5=	Belgium	3	Material of the Future, The Salvation, Two Men in Town	
5=	Canada	3	Hector and the Search for Happiness, Island of Lemurs: Madagascar, The Giver	
7=	India	2	Aussie Rules the World, The Good Lie	
7=	Ireland	2	Bad Land: Road to Fury, Vessel	
7=	United Arab Emirates	2	Desert Dancer, The Sea Is Behind	
10=	Australia	1	Aussie Rules the World	
10=	China	1	Material of the Future	
10=	Denmark	1	The Salvation	
10=	Ecuador	1	Vessel	
10=	Georgia	1	Devil in the Detail	
10=	Iceland	1	Eyes of a Thief	
10=	Indonesia	1	Vessel	
10=	Israel	1	Aussie Rules the World	
10=	Lebanon	1	The Sea Is Behind	
10=	Netherlands	1	Vessel	
10=	Pakistan	1	Vessel	
10=	Palestine	1	Eyes of a Thief	
10=	Poland	1	Vessel	
10=	Portugal	1	Vessel	
10=	Spain	1	Vessel	
10=	Sweden	1	The Salvation	
10=	Switzerland	1	Northmen: A Viking Saga	

== Critical reception ==
=== Metacritic ===
Top 10 Best Reviewed Films (Critics)
Rank	Film	Rating	No. of reviews	Ref.
1	Virunga	95%	5	
2	Timbuktu	92%	30	
3	Vessel	68%	4	
4	Island of Lemurs: Madagascar	66%	12	
5	The Good Lie	65%	30	
6	Fishing Without Nets	65%	9	

=== IMDb ===
Top 10 Best Reviewed Films
Rank	Film	Rating	No. of reviews	Ref.
1	The Blue Elephant	8.3	17,581	
2	Virunga	8.3	5,073	
3	Beats of the Antonov	7.8	58	
4	The Good Lie	7.4	17,093	
5	Timbuktu	7.2	8,311	
6	Island of Lemurs: Madagascar	7.1	652	
7=	Eyes of a Thief	7.0	202	
7=	Stories of Our Lives	7.0	65	
9	Hector and the Search for Happiness	6.9	25,222	
10	Vessel	6.9	108	

Top 10 Worst Reviewed Films
Rank	Film	Rating	No. of reviews	Ref.
1	Outpost 37	4.7	4,597	
2	Render to Caesar	4.8	6	
3	Impunity	4.9	14	
4	Ojuju	5.1	23	
5	Dry	5.2	10	
6	A Place in the Stars	5.2	6	
7	Northmen: A Viking Saga	5.3	5,344	
8	Devil in the Detail	5.4	8	
9	Two Men in Town	5.6	1,187	
10	The Sea Is Behind	5.6	27	

== African Film Awards ==
- Africa Movie Academy Awards (26 April)
- Africa Magic Viewers' Choice Awards (8 March)
- Best of Nollywood Awards (11 October)
- Cameroon Academy Awards
- Ghana Movie Awards
- Golden Icons Academy Movie Awards (25 October)
- Kenya Film & TV Awards
- Nollywood and African Film Critics Awards (13 September)
- Nollywood Movies Awards (18 October)
- South African Film and Television Awards
- Tanit d'or
- Zulu African Film Academy Awards (8 November)

== See also ==
- 2014 in film
- Cinema of Africa
- List of Nigerian films of 2014
- List of Algerian submissions for the Academy Award for Best Foreign Language Film
- List of Egyptian submissions for the Academy Award for Best Foreign Language Film
- List of Moroccan submissions for the Academy Award for Best Foreign Language Film
- List of Sub-Saharan African submissions for the Academy Award for Best Foreign Language Film
- List of Tunisian submissions for the Academy Award for Best Foreign Language Film
