= Paul Sambo =

Nigerian actor

- Born: Paul Sambo; 27 January 1976 (age 50); Bauchi State, Nigeria
- Occupations: Actor; Filmmaker
- Known for: King of Boys (2018); Mr. and Mrs. (2012)
- Spouse: Lami Daniel (m. 2012)

Paul Sambo (born 27 January 1976) is a Nigerian actor and filmmaker who appears in Kannywood and Nollywood films.

== Life ==
Sambo was born in Bauchi State, Nigeria. He married Lami Daniel in March 2012. According to TheInfoNG, the couple welcomed a daughter on 17 September 2015. He was also reported to be in a relationship with a TV presenter, Juliet Chidinma Mgborukwe, with whom he appeared in a film.

== Career ==
He appeared as Mr. Brown in Ikechukwu Onyeka's 2012 romantic film, Mr. and Mrs., which also starred Nse Ikpe Etim, Joseph Benjamin, Thelma Okoduwa, and Paul Apel.

In 2014, he featured in Stephanie Okereke's film on VVF titled, Dry, alongside Liz Benson, American actor, William McNamara, and British actor, Darwin Shaw.

He appeared in Kemi Adetiba's 2018 political thriller film, King of Boys, which also starred Adesua Etomi, Sola Sobowale, Reminisce, Illbliss, Osas Ighodaro, Omoni Oboli, and Akin Lewis.

He also starred in Kenneth Gyang's political thriller TV Series, Sons of the Caliphate, where he played the role of Khalifa.

== Filmography ==
Year	Film	Role	Notes	Ref.
2025	Finding Nina	Abdul		
2023	Lahira	Major Dino	TV Series	
2023	The Plan	Tanko	TV Mini Series	
2022	Foreigner's God	Ayke	Drama/Fantasy/Mystery	
2021	King of Boys: The Return of the King	Nurudeen Gobir	Crime / Drama	
2020	The Good Husband	Ahmed	Drama	
2019	Love Is Not Just Enough	Actor	Trailer	
2018 -	Sons of the Caliphate	Actor (Khalifa)	Political thriller Television Series	
2018 -	King of Boys	Actor (Nurudeen Gobir)	Crime political thriller	
2017	Too Late	Mr. Gideon	Short	
2016	Jacob's Mansion		Comedy	
2015	Behind the Curtains	Ice	Drama	
2014	Dry	Actor (Dr. Londi)	Drama	
2012	Mr. and Mrs.	Actor (Mr. Brown)	Drama/Family/Romance	
2012	Ebube	Actor		
2011	Ladies Gang	Kelvin	Drama	
