= Udegbe =

- Gender: Male
- Language(s): Igbo

Origin
- Word/name: Nigeria
- Meaning: Sound of gun

Udegbe audiois a surname of Igbo origin in South eastern Nigeria. It means “sound of gun”.

== Notable people with the surname include ==
- Kelechi Udegbe, Nigerian actor
- Robin Udegbe (born 1991), German footballer
