= Home in Exile =

- Directed by: Lancelot Oduwa Imasuen
- Release date: 2010
- Country: Nigeria
- Language: English

Home in Exile is a 2010 Nigerian film about selfishness, directed by Lancelot Oduwa Imasuen and premiering March 19. It premiered in Edo State on 26 September 2010, attended by actors, state assemblyman Patrick Osayime and Commissioner of Arts and Culture Abdul Oroh.

== Cast ==
- Desmond Elliot as Dave
- Beverly Naya as Jullie
- Chiwetalu Agu
- Francis Duru
- Justus Esiri
- Cliff
- Uncle Jombo
- Andrew Osawaru

== Plot ==
The king, Dave's father, likes his fiancée Jullie and marries her against tradition, leading to a family quarrel.

== Awards ==
Home in Exile won Zuma awards for best film on tourism and best script.

It also won six Terracotta awards:

1. Best Director

2. Best Make-up

3. Film of the Year

4. Best Cinematographer

5. Best Supporting Actors

6. Best Costumes
