= Okoduwa =

Okoduwa is a surname. Notable people with the surname include:

- Emmanuel Okoduwa (born 1983), Nigerian footballer
- Thelma Okoduwa, Nigerian actress
