= The Good Husband =

2020 Nigerian drama film

- Directed by: Dickson Iroegbu
- Written by: Tai Emeka-Obasi; Tobe Osigwe; Dickson Iroegbu
- Produced by: Dickson Iroegbu
- Starring: Sam Dede; Monalisa Chinda; Francis Duru; Thelma Okoduwa-Ojiji; Paul Sambo; Bassey Ekpo Bassey
- Music by: Ada Ehi-Moses; Oludare Smith
- Production company: Teamwork Studios Limited
- Distributed by: Genesis Pictures Limited
- Release date: 13 November 2020; (Nigeria)
- Running time: 105 minutes
- Country: Nigeria
- Language: English

The Good Husband, is a 2020 Nigerian drama film directed and produced by Dickson Iroegbu. The film stars Sam Dede and Monalisa Chinda in the lead roles whereas Francis Duru, Thelma Okoduwa-Ojiji, Paul Sambo and Bassey Ekpo Bassey made supportive roles. The film deals with the problems that arise with marriages.

The film was shot in Federal Capital Territory, Abuja. It made its premier on 13 November 2020. The film received mixed reviews from critics.

== Cast ==
- Sam Dede as Martins
- Monalisa Chinda as Rosa
- Francis Duru as Theophilus
- Thelma Okoduwa-Ojiji as Valerie
- Paul Sambo as Ahmed
- Bassey Ekpo Bassey as Wole
- Eeefy Ify Ike as Esther
- Ese Brodericks as Uloma
- Henry Shield Nwazuruahu
- Link Edochie
