= Elsayed =

Elsayed can refer to:

== People ==
=== Surname ===
- Abdelrahman El-Sayed (born 1989), Egyptian weightlifter
- Abdel-Wahed El-Sayed (born 1977), Egyptian footballer
- Abdul El-Sayed (born 1984), American doctor and politician
- Dahlia Elsayed (born 1969), American painter and writer
- Emadeldin Elsayed (born 1986), Egyptian documentary filmmaker
- Essmat Elsayed (born 1986), Egyptian weightlifter
- Esraa El-Sayed (born 1998), Egyptian weightlifter
- Fady Elsayed (born 1993), British actor
- Karim Elsayed (born 1995), Egyptian canoeist
- Mohamed Elsayed (born 1973), Egyptian boxer
- Mohamed El-Sayed (born 1987), Qatari international footballer
- Mohamed Mohamed el-Amir Awad el-Sayed Atta (1968–2001), Egyptian hijacker and one of the ringleaders in the September 11 attacks
- Noura Elsayed (born 1987), Egyptian middle-distance runner
- Rasha Elsayed (born 1981), Egyptian volleyball player
- Shaker Elsayed, Imam of the Dar Al-Hijrah mosque in Falls Church, Virginia

=== Given Name ===
- Elsayed Aboumedan (born 1977), Egyptian judoka
- Elsayed Eldizwi (1926–1991), Egyptian footballer
- Elsayed Elsayed Wagih (born 21 November 1946, Egyptian Professor of Virology and Biotechnology and vice President of the Arab Society for Biotechnology
- Elsayed Hamdi, Egyptian football striker
- Sara Samir Elsayed Mohamed Ahmed (born 1998), Egyptian weightlifter
