= Kangaroo: A Love-Hate Story =

2017 Australian documentary film

Kangaroo: A Love Hate Story
- Directed by: Mick McIntyre; Kate McIntyre Clere
- Written by: Mick McIntyre; Kate McIntyre Clere
- Starring: Kangaroo Dundee; Tim Flannery; Terri Irwin; Peter Singer; Philip Wollen
- Cinematography: Mick McIntyre
- Edited by: Wayne Hyett
- Music by: David Bridie
- Production company: Second Nature Films
- Distributed by: Abramorama; Indievillage
- Release date: 5 February 2017
- Running time: 103 minutes
- Country: Australia
- Language: English

Kangaroo: A Love-Hate Story is an Australian environmental documentary co-written and directed by Mick McIntyre and Kate McIntyre Clere, and produced by Second Nature Films. The film centres around the relationship that Australians share with kangaroos, and features experts on different sides of the issue, including interviews with Tim Flannery and Terri Irwin. The film opened in Australia on 5 February 2017, and opened in limited release in the United States on 19 January 2018.

== Background ==
Kangaroo began as an interest to delve deeper into the split opinion concerning the animal, with McIntyre Clere saying that they were surprised to learn just how many kangaroos are shot and sold for profit each year.

The film opens in the middle of the action, with home video that was shot and provided by one of the interviewees in the film, showing the violent and brutal shooting of kangaroos on the edge of the individual's property. Kangaroos are seen as the icon of Australia, and the marsupial is featured in everything from tourism advertisements, sports teams, and Qantas, the national airline of Australia. The crux of the documentary is to shed light on the dark and violent truth that lies within the commercial kangaroo industry, and highlights the culling of the icon.

The film includes graphic scenes with the aftermath of kangaroo harvesting, explaining that while there are regulations put in place to ensure that the kangaroos are killed in a humane way (a bullet to the head), it is revealed that a sizeable percentage of culled kangaroos were shot in the neck or the jaw, rather than the head, causing prolonged suffering. Another important point in the film is that the systemic algorithm used to track and monitor kangaroo populations, is complicated and flawed as it does include factors such as drought, illegal shooting, climate change or slow reproduction rates. Kangaroo includes opinions from all sides of the issue, including those from a political and economic perspective, as well as from a humanitarian and scientific perspective, interviewing members of Australian parliament and environmental experts.

== Cast ==
Due to the documentary nature of the film, the cast does not feature a list of characters, but rather a list of credible sources who lent their time and expertise to appear in the film. Listed here are some of the featured Australians who were interviewed.

Person	Role
Kangaroo Dundee	Himself
Tim Flannery	Himself
Terri Irwin	Herself
Peter Singer	Himself
Philip Wollen	Himself

== Production ==
The film was produced by Second Nature Films, and co-written and directed by the team of Mick McIntyre and Kate McIntyre Clere.

== Release ==
Kangaroo opened in Australia on 5 February 2017, and opened in limited release in the United States on 19 January 2018.

== Reception ==
The film received a mix of critical reviews when it first premiered. Many were in positive support of the film, with the New York Times saying that filmmakers "sound a wake-up siren" and that the film "isn't always pretty, but it is necessary." Variety had positive comments, praising the documentary, and noting that it "has the potential to help bring kangaroo welfare and management into much sharper focus in Australia and internationally," if a solution to the slaughter was to ever be found.

Kangaroo holds a score of 78% on Rotten Tomatoes and a score of 66 on Metacritic.

Others, however, did not receive the film positively, especially farmers and those working in the commercial kangaroo industry, saying that the documentary was a "beat up" and expressed fears that it could ruin the industry. Politicians also criticised the film. When NSW Greens senator Lee Rhiannon, one of the politicians featured in the documentary, spoke at one of the premieres with several other animal activists, her support and promotion of the film were labelled as "disgusting" by Minister for Agriculture David Littleproud. A negative reaction was also received from the National Farmers' Federation and its president, Fiona Simson, who criticised the documentary for "misrepresenting the situation," and "ignoring basic facts," claiming that the film was "very damaging to Australia." Other farmers and meat processors were critical, declaring that Kangaroo uses "shock tactics", and questioned the motives of the filmmakers.

The directors said that although they knew that the topic was controversial, they were shocked at how polarising the documentary was.

== Awards ==
Awards
Year	Ceremony	Category	Result	Ref.
2017	Santa Barbara International Film Festival	Social Justice Award	Nominated	
2017	Wildlife Conservation Film Festival	Best in Region (Australia)	Winner	
2017	Australian Teachers of Media (ATOM) Awards	Best Documentary	Nominated	
2018	13th Cyprus International Film Festival	Best Featured Documentary	Winner	
2018	Melbourne Documentary Festival	Best Australian Documentary	Winner	
2018	World Documentary Awards	Platinum Award	Winner/Overall Winner	
2018	Impact Doc Awards	Award of Excellence	Winner	

While Kangaroo had met the minimum requirements to be submitted for consideration for a 2019 Academy Award nomination, and the creators did launch a "For Your Consideration" advertising campaign in an effort to catch the academy's interest, the film did not receive a nomination, nor was it a shortlisted finalist.

=== Accolades ===
- Marché Du Film Festival De Cannes, France (2017) – Special Screening
- Wildlife Film Festival: Rotterdam, Netherlands (2017) – Official Selection
- International Wildlife Film Festival, Missoula, Montana, US (2018) – Featured Film
- Colorado Environmental Film Festival (2018) – Featured Viewing
- Oz Film Festival, London (2018) – Featured Documentary

== See also ==
- Aussie Rules the World
