= Dry (2014 film) =

2014 Nigerian drama film

- Theatrical release poster
- Directed by: Stephanie Linus
- Written by: Stephanie Okereke
- Produced by: Jane Lawalata; Stephanie Linus
- Starring: Stephanie Okereke; Liz Benson; William McNamara; Darwin Shaw; Olu Jacobs; Paul Sambo
- Cinematography: Angel Barroeta
- Edited by: Jane Lawalata
- Music by: Lisbeth Scott
- Production company: Next Page Productions
- Distributed by: Silverbird Film Distribution
- Release dates: 29 November 2014 (Wales); 2 August 2014 (Silverbird Galleria); 14 August 2014 (Nigeria)
- Running time: 115 minutes
- Country: Nigeria
- Language: English

Dry is a 2014 Nigerian drama film directed by Stephanie Linus and starring Stephanie Okereke, Liz Benson, William McNamara, Darwin Shaw and Paul Sambo. On 20 July 2013, a teaser trailer for the film was released, in response to the Child marriage controversy ongoing in Nigeria at the time.

The film's theme focuses on Vesicovaginal fistula condition and underaged marriage among young women, narrating the ordeal of a thirteen-year-old girl.

== Plot ==
A thirteen-year-old girl, Halima (Zubaida Ibrahim Fagge), is married off to Sani (Tijjani Faraga) a 60-year-old man, who constantly rapes her, by her poor uneducated parents.

Halima gets pregnant and suffers Vesicovaginal Fistula (VVF) after child delivery; she's consequently abandoned by her husband and discriminated in the society. Zara (Stephanie Okereke), a medical doctor who also suffered a horrific childhood meets Halima; she tries to help her get through her situation and also save other young women under such circumstance.

== Cast ==
- Zubaida Ibrahim Fagge as Halima
- Stephanie Okereke as Dr Zara
- Liz Benson as Matron
- William McNamara as Dr Brown
- Darwin Shaw as Dr Alex
- Paul Sambo
- Olu Jacobs as Speaker
- Rahama Hassan as Fatima
- Hauwa Maina as Hadiza
- Rekiya Ibrahim Atta as Sani's Mother
- Hakeem Hassan as Honourable Musa
- Tijjani Faraga as Sani
- Klint da Drunk as Dr. Mutanga
- Vineeta Pathak

== Production ==
Okereke had been disturbed with the child marriage issue since she was in College and had been thinking on how to tackle the topic. The making of Dry was inspired by a true life story of a lady Okereke met in Northern Nigeria. She stated: "I have been to the North and to other parts of the country, and I have seen first-hand how this health issue defies normal living for girls and women of different ages. I have decided to share their stories through DRY" "The issue might seem controversial, but if it will set one girl free and open the minds of the people, and also instruct different bodies and individuals to take action, then the movie would have served its purpose". According to Linus, the film was in production for three years; it was reported in September 2012 that Stephanie Okereke just hit location for the film. The film marked the return of Liz Benzon to the big screen after a long time of absence from films. The opening scenes which were initially meant to be shot in Los Angeles were later moved to Aberystwyth, Wales by the line producers, Akanimo Odon and Murtza Ali Ghaznavi. The film was also shot in Aberystwyth University campus, in which the university acted as a production partner. Students from the University's Department of Theatre, Film and Television Studies were present on set to gain practical experience and to also help with the film shoot, and several University staff had minor acting roles, in addition to the professional cast.

== Release ==
The film's teaser trailer was released on 20 July 2013. This was around the time of "Child marriage controversy in Nigeria", when the senate was unable to remove a clause of the 1999 constitution of the Federal Republic of Nigeria which states that "any woman that is married in Nigeria is of full age" due to shortage of votes from members of senate. This however was misconstrued by the general public as a bill for underaged marriage, which drew a lot of media attention at the time. Stephanie Okereke coincidentally just concluded the principal photography of the film at the time, so she released a RAW footage teaser trailer to lend her voice against the "alleged bill". The official trailer was released on 3 September 2014.

Dry premiered on 29 November 2014 at the Aberystwyth Arts Centre, Wales. Behind the Scenes documentary video for the film was uploaded on "NextPage" YouTube channel on 30 July 2015, and the film premiered at the Silverbird Galleria in Lagos on 3 August 2015. The film also premiered in Abuja on 13 August 2015, before going on a general release the next day, on 14 August.

== Reception ==
=== Critical reception ===
The film has been generally met with positive critical reception, mainly because of the film's message. Onyeka Onwelue on Premium Times commends the film's cinematography and story, concluding "No matter how you may want to summarize it, Dry is a propagandist work but a beautifully stitched story about humanity; it drags you through the facades of beauty, it takes you on a walk through the surface of imperialism. Ms. [Stephanie] Linus has created unforgettable characters, stapled with a storyline that, at once, amazes and truncates you. Dry is masterly orchestrated". Chilee Agunanna of Nigerian Entertainment Today notes that the film overtly plays like a documentary, but concludes: "Dry is a beautiful movie whose new star should be up for some major awards during the next awards season. The issues raised in the movie are genuine and demand attention". Amarachukwu Iwuala of 360Nobs notes several inconsistencies in the film due to poor research and scripting, but concludes: "The screenwriter, who also happens to be the director, could have been more thorough in her research to close up the gaping holes, many of which arise from storytelling. However, the visual demonstration of Halima’s suffering is enough to melt a stony heart and even if it is for that reason alone, Dry is worth your while". Wilfred Okiche of YNaija notes that very few attention was paid to detail, but concludes: "Dry is funny and at the same time, sad. But it is a story we will all like for the beauty of its storytelling".

=== Criticism ===
The film has been criticized for too much generalization, and the constant reference of "Coming to Africa" like a country which sounds hollywoodish. In 2017, Nigerian writer, Daniella Madudu filed a court case that claimed that the story-line in the film was stolen from her illegitimately.

== Themes ==
Stephanie Okereke stated: "Dry as a movie is going to bring up a lot of the maternal issues that we have in this country and the fact that a lot of less privileged women are dying during childbirth. It also dwells on early marriage and the backlash. It is also going to bring to focus the need for young girls to be allowed to live their lives". Isabella Akinseye commented: "Dry does not hold back in putting burning issues of rape, child marriage, obstetric fistula and the societal stigma that comes with it in our face" "It shows us through the character of a young girl who is forced into an early marriage with devastating results". Okereke also stated in an interview with Jones Magazine: "VVF is a major gynecological problem in many parts of the developing world. The film will be used as an educational tool to create awareness and bring to consciousness the degrading experience young unprivileged women go through in Africa during childbirth".

== Awards ==
At the 2016 Africa Magic Viewers' Choice Awards (AMVCA), Dry was nominated in nine categories, and won three of the awards: Best Overall Movie, Best Costume Designer (Uche Nancy), and Best Sound Editor (Jose Guillermo).

== See also ==
- 2014 in film
- List of Nigerian films of 2014
- List of African films of 2014
- List of British films of 2014
- Vesicovaginal fistula
