= Klint da Drunk =

Nigerian Comedian and Actor (born 1975)

- Born: 3 March 1975 (age 51); Anambra State, Nigeria
- Occupations: Comedian, actor, dancer, musician, gadget enthusiast and painter
- Years active: 1991–present
- Spouse: Divorced
- Children: 5 (1 in Germany)

Afamefuna Klint Igwemba (born 3 March 1975) popularly known as Klint da Drunk is a Nigerian comedian, actor, musician, painter, and dancer.

== Filmography ==
Title	Role	Year
Star Girl	Klint	2021
Bond		2019
Knock Out		2019
19 Willock Place	Reaper	2019
Price of Deceit	Wande	2017
Brother Jekwu	Ndubisi	2016
Fast Cash	Emeka	2016
Madam 10/10	Tom-Tom	2015
Ojuju		2014
Dry	Dr. Mutanga	2014
My House Help		2007
Lost Kingdom		2007
Destroyers		2007
Men on the Run		2006
Men on the Run 2		2006
