= Ariane Astrid Atodji =

Cameroon filmmaker

Ariane Astrid Atodji أريان أستريد أتودجي
- Born: Ariane Astrid Atodji; 1980 (age 45–46); Nguelemendouka, Cameroon
- Education: University of Yaoundé
- Occupations: Director, producer, screen writer, journalist, actress
- Years active: 2004–present

Ariane Astrid Atodji (Arabic: أريان أستريد أتودجي; born 1980), is a Cameroonian filmmaker as well as a screenwriter. She has made several critically acclaimed documentaries including Koundi et le Jeudi national and La souffrance est une école de sagesse.

== Personal life ==
She was born in 1980 in Nguelemendouka, Cameroon. She graduated from University of Yaoundé and then attended film workshops at the Goethe Institute in Yaoundé. Then she moved to the LN International Film School of Yaoundé for further studies.

== Career ==
In 2010, she directed her maiden documentary Koundi et le Jeudi national which was produced with the support of the Goethe Institute. She won the special jury prize at the Dubai Film Festival (DIFF) for the film. In 2014, she directed the second documentary La souffrance est une école de sagesse.

== Filmography ==
| Year | Film | Role | Genre | Ref. |
|---|---|---|---|---|
| 2010 | Koundi et le Jeudi national (Koundi and National Thursday) | Director, writer | documentary | |
| 2014 | La souffrance est une école de sagesse (Suffering is a School of Wisdom) | Director | documentary | |
