= Yvonne Enakhena =

Nigerian actress

- Citizenship: Nigerian
- Education: University of Lagos
- Occupations: Actress film producer

Yvonne Enakhena is a Nigerian actress and film producer.

== Education ==
Enakhena holds a degree in Theatre and Media Arts from University of Lagos.

== Career ==
On her career path she claimed to have been sexually harassed when seeking a role. Yvonne Enakhena started acting in 2012. She got popular for her character role in the series Hotel Majestic. In 2017, she produced her own movie titled Trace.

== Filmography ==
- The Bull in the Hacker (2020) as Police Inspector 2
- Blood Letters (2018) as Yemi
- Trace (2018) as Ivory
- Visions (2017) as Bruja
- Hotel Majestic
- Aaron My Son
- Ojuju (2014) as Aisha
- Four Crooks and a Rookie (2013) as Reporter 1
- Journey to Self (2012) as Mona

== Awards and nominations ==
Year	Award	Category	work	Result	Ref
2019	Best of Nollywood Awards	Best Actress in a Supporting Role (English)	Scarred	Nominated	

== See also ==
- List of Nigerian film producers
- List of Nigerian actors
