= The Last Ranger =

2024 South African short film

- Festival poster
- Directed by: Cindy Lee
- Written by: David S Lee; Darwin Shaw; Will Hawkes
- Produced by: Darwin Shaw; Will Hawkes
- Starring: Avumile Qongqo; Liyabona Mroqoza; David S Lee
- Cinematography: James Adey
- Edited by: Gugu Sibandze
- Music by: John Powell
- Production company: Six Feet Films
- Release date: January 7, 2024 (Pan African Film Festival)
- Running time: 28 minutes
- Country: USA/South Africa
- Languages: English; Xhosa

The Last Ranger is a 2024 US/South African short drama film directed by Cindy Lee and produced by Darwin Shaw & Will Hawkes of Six Feet Films, as the second film in their international anthology, When The World Stopped. The film explores rhinoceros poaching and conservation efforts in the Amakhala Game Reserve, Eastern Cape, South Africa during the pandemic. Based on true life events, the story was brought to the producers by David S. Lee after witnessing the results of a poaching attack. The film had its premiere at the Pan African Film Festival on January 7, 2024.

On 23 January 2025, it was nominated for the Best Live Action Short Film at the 97th Academy Awards.

== Synopsis ==
The last remaining ranger of Amakhala Game Reserve Eastern Cape, South Africa, is the strong-willed and fearless Khuselwa, who works alongside Robert to protect the wildlife. Though they are struggling with funds due to the pandemic's effect on tourism, Khuselwa is passionate about her role. One day she encounters her friend Litha, a young Xhosa girl, who is on her way to sell souvenirs. Litha joins Khuselwa for a ride through the reserve, introducing her to a pair of rhinos, including Thandi, who Khuselwa has a special bond with. She admits to Litha that she considers the animals to be her family.

However, three poachers descend on the rhinos, intent on removing their horns with a chainsaw. Thandi is tranquilized, and though Robert (who is repairing a fence elsewhere) urges Khuselwa to not confront the poachers alone, she is unable to stand by and orders Litha to stay in the jeep as she fights the poachers. Though she manages to wound one with a rifle, the other shoots her in the stomach, mortally wounding her. Her attacker is taken out by the guilt-ridden poacher with the tranquilizer, but the other poacher manages to remove Thandi's horn and escape.

Litha leaves the jeep and encounters the dying Khuselwa, tearfully begging her to survive. Khuselwa reminds her to rely on her strength and "stay wild." As Litha approaches the injured Thandi, the remaining poacher steps out, and is revealed to be her own father. A devastated Litha accuses him of killing Khuselwa and Thandi. However, her father manages to talk her down and apologizes for his role in the incident. Robert finally arrives, and upon seeing the injured Thandi, asks for Litha's help.

Some time later, Litha is working with Rob as a ranger. It is revealed that Thandi was successfully saved, and she has a calf named after Khuselwa. An epilogue reveals that Thandi's story is true; she had been saved by multiple surgeries and went on to have many calves, and is currently still alive and protected. However, poachers have killed over 100,000 rhinos and 1,000 rangers while trafficking rhino horns.

== Cast ==
- Avumile Qongqo as "Khuselwa"
- Liyabona Mroqoza as "Litha"
- Makhaola Ndebele as "Thabo"
- David S Lee as "Robert"
- Kamogelo Ndawo as "Older Litha"
- Waldemar Schultz as "Micky"
- Nompumelo Vanga as "Gogo"
- Sikhumbuzo Sibisis as "Jax"

== Production ==
The film was produced by Six Feet Films in conjunction with The Star Film company and Jotola productions in South Africa with an international collaboration of artists. This was most evident in a score by John Powell which incorporates the voices of the Thanda Choir as well as a myriad of other musicians. It was shot in 2021 during the peak of Covid, and is set against the landscapes of the Amakhala Game Reserve and Kariega Game Reserve in the Eastern Cape.

== Release ==
The film won over twenty awards including the Pan-African film festival which qualified it for an Academy Award in 2025, the Maggie and Clover award in the Cleveland International Film Festival in April 2024. and both the Green Fire (Best Film) and the Blue Fire Award (Audience Choice) at The American Conservation Film Festival. The film was later then nominated for the 97th Academy Awards for best live-action short film.

It was showcased at the Indy Shorts Film Festival on 23 July 2024 in Nature & Conservation.

The film was showcased in the 2024 Cordillera International Film Festival on 27 September 2024 in Movies in the Ballpark - Shorts Program #5 - Blended Block.

It was also presented at the Black Star International Film Festival on 18 September 2024.

== Accolades ==
| Award | Date of ceremony | Category | Recipient(s) | Result | Ref. |
|---|---|---|---|---|---|
| Cleveland International Film Festival | 13 April 2024 | Audience Choice Award for Best Overall Short | The Last Ranger | 2 | |
| Cleveland International Film Festival | 13 April 2024 | The Clover & Maggie Award: In Celebration of Life | Cindy Lee | Won | |
| San Diego International Film Festival | 20 October 2024 | Best Short Narrative | David S Lee, Darwin Shaw, Will Hawkes | Won | |
| Academy Awards | March 2, 2025 | Best Live Action Short Film | Cindy Lee & Darwin Shaw | Nominated | |
