= Francis Duru =

Nigerian actor (1969–2026)

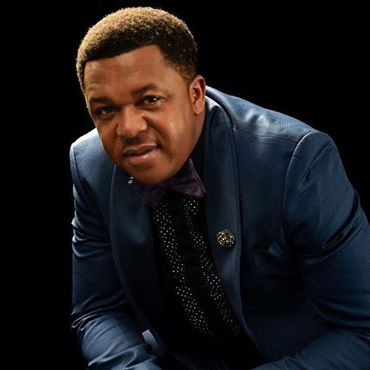
- Duru in 2019
- Born: Francis Ogide Duru; 27 July 1969; Cameroon
- Died: 23 October 2026 (aged 57)
- Education: University of Port Harcourt
- Occupation: Actor
- Years active: 1989–2026
- Spouse: Adokiye Duru
- Children: 4

Richard Francis Duru (born Francis Ogide Duru; 27 July 1969 – 23 October 2026) was a Nigerian actor who in 2007 received the United Nations Ambassador of Peace award for his positive influence on the youths. In 2010, Duru was appointed the interim president of the Actors Guild of Nigeria (AGN) and also in the same year was nominated for Best Actor in a Supporting Role at the Africa Movie Academy Awards.

== Background ==
Duru was born on 27 July 1969 in Cameroon to Nigerian parents who hail from Imo State, Nigeria. He received both primary and secondary school education in Cameroon, but in order to obtain a B.Sc. degree, he moved to Nigeria, where he applied to the University of Port Harcourt in Rivers State, and was accepted as an undergraduate to study Theatre arts. In 1996, he obtained a B.A. degree in Theatre Arts.

== Career ==
Duru debuted in the Nigerian movie industry in 1989 with a movie titled Missing Mark. The movie was directed by the now deceased director; Ndubuisi Oko. Duru’s feature in the movie did not do enough for his career, as at the time he was still regarded as an up-and-coming actor.

He became more prominent in the Nigerian movie industry in 1995 after featuring in an action-comedy movie titled Rattlesnake a movie produced by now deceased director; Amaka Igwe. He played a significant role in the movie as the character Ahanna.

== Humanitarian work ==
Duru worked extensively with local and foreign non-governmental organizations (NGOs) in order to ensure that African children have a better education and a higher standard of living. According to a reputable Nigerian print media called the Vanguard, Duru has worked with UNICEF, USAID, LEAP AFRICA, and COMPASS.

== Personal life and death ==
Duru and his wife Adokiye got married in 2003 and had four children together. Duru and Adokiye both attended the University of Port Harcourt, Rivers State.

Duru died on 23 October 2026, at the age of 57, following a brief illness. His death was confirmed by the National President of the Actors Guild of Nigeria (AGN), Alhaji Abubakar Sanusi Yakubu, who broke the news on social media to express grief.

== Awards ==
Duru was a recipient of the United Nations Ambassador of Peace award for his positive influence on the youths. He won the Best Actor in a Leading Role (Igbo) award in 2020 Best of Nollywood Awards for his role in Mboputa.

== Selected filmography ==
- Ugly Bird (2024) as Emenike
- Abigail's Memoir (2024) as Mr. Bassey
- Blood Vessel (2023) as Pere
- The Locals (2021) as Headmaster
- The Good Husband (2020) as Theophilus
- Mboputa (2020)
- Why Not? (2019) as Frank
- Merry Men: The Real Yoruba Demons (2018) as Inspector Jack
- Who Killed Chief? (2017) as Chief Greg
- Lipstick (2016) as Nedu
- Mortuary Gate (2014) as Paulinus
- Stigma (2013) as Counsellor
- Sister of Virtue (2012) as Kelechi
- Home In Exile (2010)
- Nnenda (2009)
- Always Mine (2009) as Obieze
- Breaking Heart (2009) as Johnbull
- Entanglement (2009)
- Bless My Soul (2008) as Emeka
- Lumba Boys (2008)
- One On One (2008)
- Worst Enemy (2008)
- Laviva (2007)
- Final War (2007)
- Gods Of No Mercy (2007)
- Great Ambassadors (2007)
- House In Crisis (2007) as Uchenna
- Love And Likeness (2007) as Mezie
- Persecution (2007)
- Rhythm Of Love (2007)
- Royal Grandmother (2007) as Azubuike
- Short Of Time (2007) as Naira
- Silent Whispers (2007)
- Total War (2007) as Pastor Henry
- Warriors Of Satan (2007)
- Will Of God (2007)
- Clash Of Interest (2006) as Kalu
- Forces Of Nature (2006) as Vincent
- My Girl Friend (2006)
- My Little Secret (2006)
- Personal Assignment (2006) as Melum
- Soul Engagement (2006)
- Soul Engagement II (2006)
- Soul Engagement III (2006)
- Sound Of Love (2006) as Silas
- Sound Of Love II (2006)
- Sweet Sound (2006)
- Sweet Sound II (2006)
- Tears From Holland (2006)
- Tears From Holland II (2006)
- Upside Down (2006) as Patrick
- Upside Down II (2006)
- Without Apology (2006)
- Without Apology II (2006)
- Cold War (2005) as Obinna
- Price of Destiny (2004)
- Set-Up (2000)
- Laraba (2000)
- Narrow Escape (1999) as Emmanuel 2
- Blood Money 2 (1998) as Jude
- Blood Money (1997) as Jude
- Rattlesnake (1995) as Ahanna
- Iva (1993) as Kupengo
- Missing Mark (1989)

== Awards and nominations ==
Year	Award ceremony	Category	Film	Result	Ref
2020	Best of Nollywood Awards	Best Actor in a Lead role –Igbo	Mboputa	Won	
