= Ojuju =

2014 film by C.J. Obasi

- Film poster
- Directed by: C.J. Obasi
- Written by: C.J. Obasi
- Produced by: Oge Obasi (nee Ugwu); C.J. "Fiery" Obasi
- Starring: Gabriel Afolayan; Omowumi Dada; Kelechi Udegbe; Chidozie Nzeribe; Brutus Richard; Meg Otanwa; Paul Utomi
- Cinematography: Tunji Akinsehinwa
- Edited by: C.J. Obasi
- Music by: Wache Pollen; David Jones David (score); Beatoven
- Production company: Fiery Film
- Release date: 11 November 2014 (AFRIFF)
- Running time: 95 minutes
- Country: Nigeria
- Languages: English (Pidgin); Igbo; Yoruba

Ojuju is a 2014 Nigerian zombie thriller film, written and directed by C.J. Obasi. The film which has a zero-budget, stars Gabriel Afolayan, Omowunmi Dada, and Kelechi Udegbe. It premiered at the 4th Africa International Film Festival, where it won the award for "Best Nigerian Movie".

== Cast ==
- Gabriel Afolayan as Romero
- Omowumi Dada as Peju
- Kelechi Udegbe as Emmy
- Chidozie Nzeribe as Fela
- Brutus Richard as Gaza
- Meg Otanwa as Alero
- Paul Utomi as The First Ojuju
- Yvonne Enakhena as Aisha
- Jumoke Ayadi as Iya Sikiru
- Tommy Oyewole as Officer Lade
- Emeka Okoye as The Chemist
- Kelechi Joseph as Teenage boy
- Klint da Drunk (cameo)

== Production ==
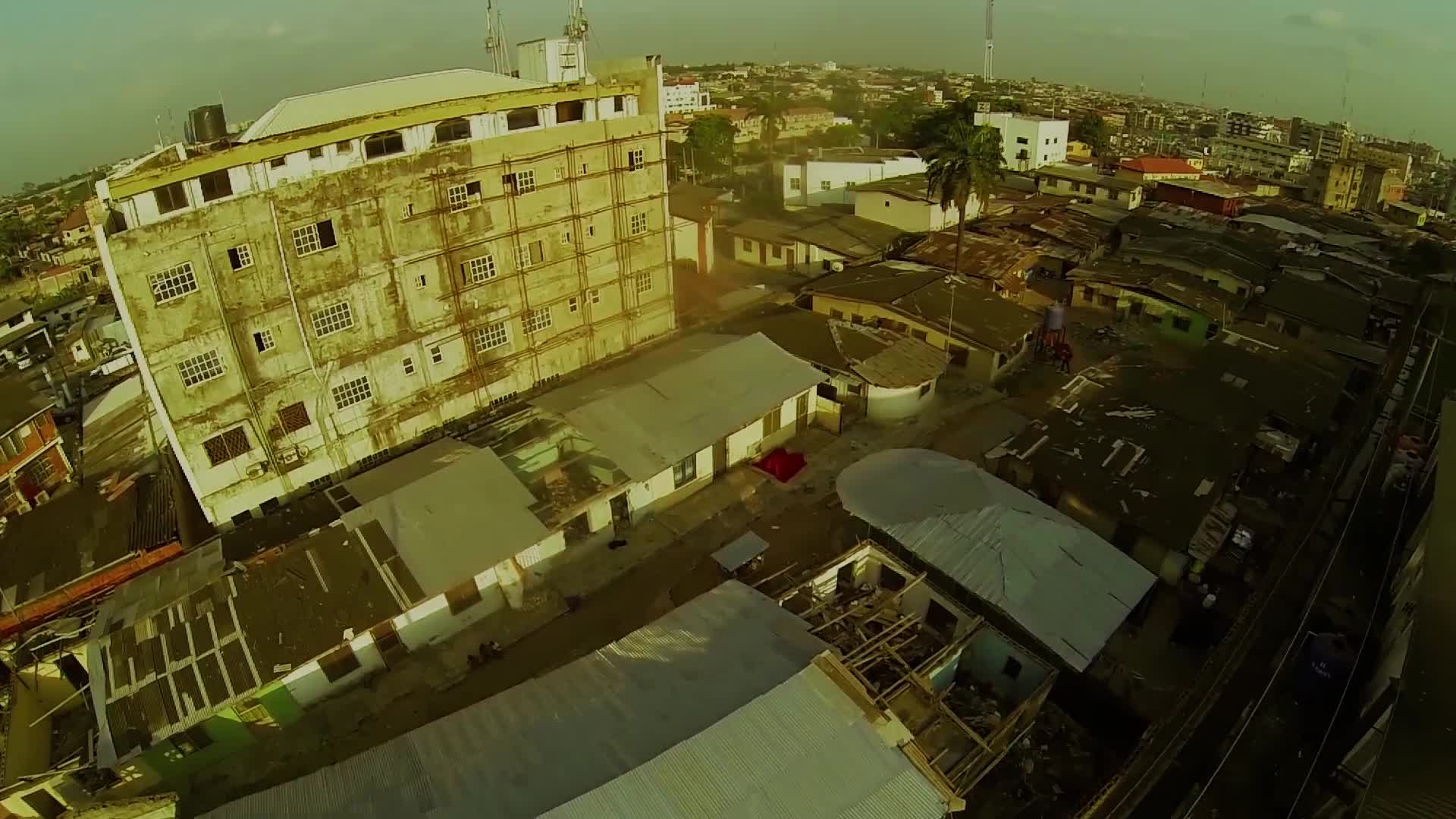
Aerial shot of the slum where Ojuju was shot

C.J. Obasi had been visiting a friend in a slum location. He observed unique features of the area; which included for example, the area has a single point of entry and exit, the area also had only one source of water, which everyone fetched from. Obasi then decided to develop a story based on this premise, since it was feasible to create a story based on the consequences of pollution to the common Nigerian. In an interview, Obasi stated that he chose the name "Ojuju" because he didn’t want to use the word "zombies" in any manner or form, as he believed that if such an outbreak occurred in the slums of Lagos, the "Zombie" word would hardly be used to describe it. Obasi also felt it would be more realistic to eliminate any supernatural elements to the plot, and localize the Zombie genre for the Nigerian environment, rather than trying to do a Hollywood-version of what a zombie film ought to be.

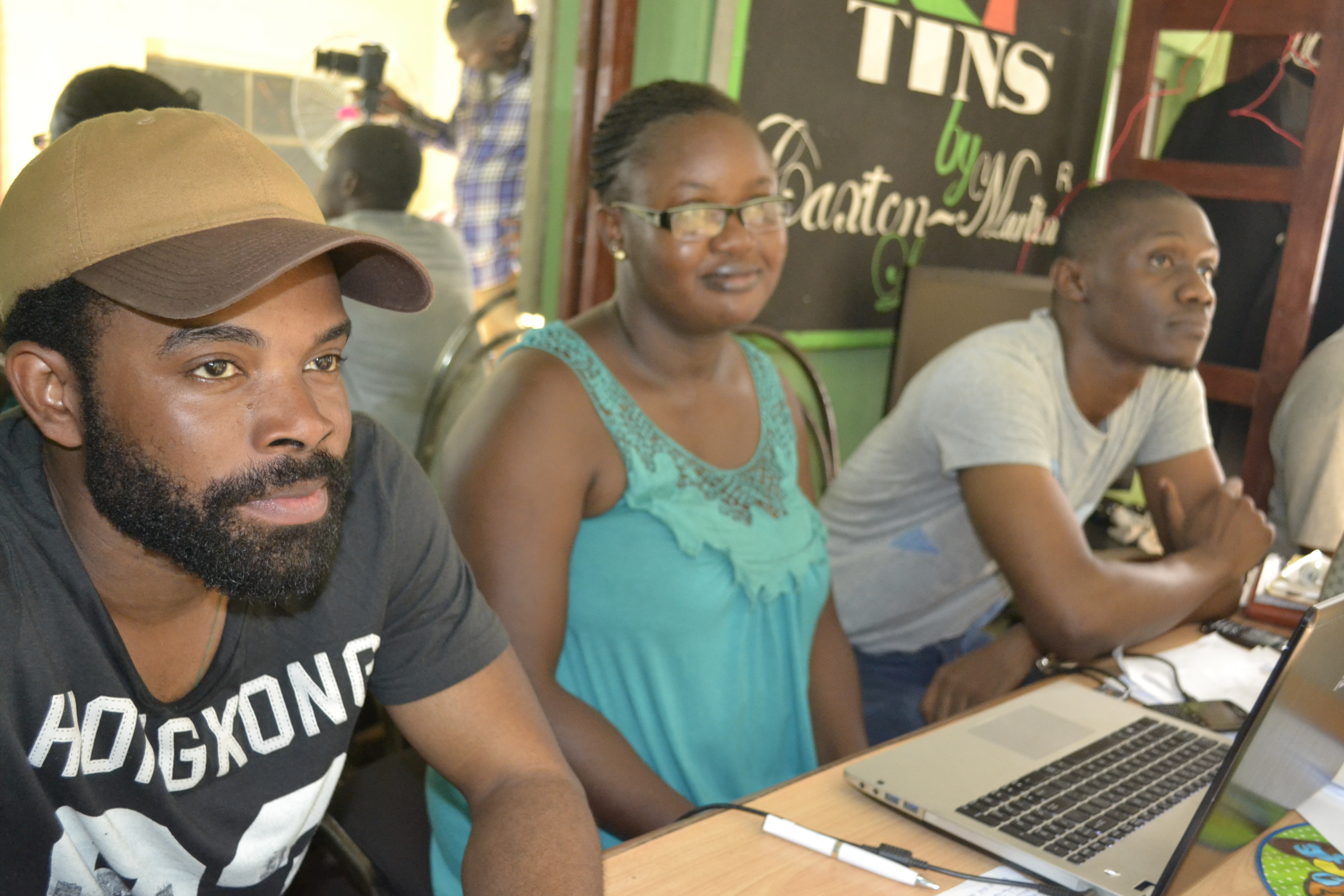
L-R: Gabriel Afolayan, Oge Obasi, and C.J. "Fiery" Obasi, at the audition for Ojuju in Surulere

The first actor to be cast in Ojuju was Gabriel Afolayan, who would play the lead character of Romero in the film. Next was Paul Utomi, an actor who Obasi had wanted to work with for some time. Other members of the main cast, including Omowunmi Dada and Yvonne Enakhena, were in an open audition for the film.

Principal photography for Ojuju began in November 2013, in a close-knit slum location in Ikeja, Lagos. Additional establishment scenes were shot around Bariga, while the police station scenes were shot in "Compact E-Schedular", a film and television production company at Opebi, Ikeja in February 2014. Initial budget for the film was ₦5,000,000 ($30,000); however, no investor showed any interest in funding the film. Eventually, Obasi, along with Oge Obasi, the producer of the film struck pro bono deals regarding equipment leasing, and with cast and crew. Most of the extras featured in the film were real inhabitants of the slum, where the film was shot.

== Music ==
The film was scored by Wache Pollen, with additional soundtrack by Beatoven. Original background scores were composed by David Jones David. The lyrics of the closing song “Run Things” was penned by C.J. Obasi.

== Release ==
A teaser trailer for Ojuju was released to the public on 10 August 2014. The film premiered at the 2014 Africa International Film Festival on 11 November 2014.

== Reception ==
=== Critical response ===
Todd Brown of Twitch Film concludes: "There is no question at all that Ojuju has its limitations. But it also shows a clarity of vision and a broad base of skills that mark Obasi as a director to watch out for". Frank Scheck of The Hollywood Reporter wrote: "Although made on an obviously minuscule budget, this enterprising genre pic is very well crafted. Infused with both sly humor and genuine thrills, it puts many similarly themed American efforts to shame, with the exoticism of its setting only adding to the overall effect." In a 2022 IndieWire article, Ojuju was listed on rank 11 of the Best Zombie Films of All Time category.

=== Awards and recognition ===
Year	Award	Category	Recipient	Result
2014	Africa International Film Festival	Best Nigerian Film	Ojuju	Won
2015	Golden Icons Academy Movie Awards	Best Film (Drama)	Ojuju	Nominated
2015	Golden Icons Academy Movie Awards	Best Film (foreign language)	Ojuju	Nominated
2015	Golden Icons Academy Movie Awards	Best Editing	C.J. Obasi	Won
2015	Golden Icons Academy Movie Awards	Best Sound	Dayo Thompson	Nominated
2015	Golden Icons Academy Movie Awards	Best Cinematography	Tunji Akinsehinwa	Nominated
2015	Golden Icons Academy Movie Awards	Best Makeup/Costume	Funke Olowu	Nominated
2015	Golden Icons Academy Movie Awards	Best Producer	Oge Obasi	Nominated
2015	Best of Nollywood Awards	Best Actor in Leading Role (English)	Gabriel Afolayan	Nominated
2015	Best of Nollywood Awards	Best Supporting Actor (English)	Kelechi Udegbe	Nominated
2015	Best of Nollywood Awards	Best Supporting Actress (English)	Omowunmi Dada	Won
2015	Best of Nollywood Awards	Movie with the Best Screenplay	Ojuju	Nominated
2015	Best of Nollywood Awards	Movie with the Best Editing	Ojuju	Nominated
2015	Best of Nollywood Awards	Best use of Make-up in a Movie	Ojuju	Won
2015	Best of Nollywood Awards	Best use of Indigenous Nigerian Language in a movie	Ojuju	Nominated
2016	Africa Magic Viewers' Choice Awards	Best Make-up Artist	Funke Olowu	Nominated

== Cultural references ==
While exploring the evil dead theme, the film's hero, Romero, is named after Night of the Living Dead director George A. Romero.
