= Nguelemendouka =

Coordinates: 4°23′N 12°55′E

- Commune and town
- Interactive map of Nguelemendouka
- Country: Cameroon
- Region: East
- Time zone: UTC+1 (WAT)

Nguelemendouka is a town and commune in Cameroon.

== See also ==
- Communes of Cameroon
