= Aussie Rules the World =

- Directed by: Michael Stringer McIntyre
- Written by: Michael Stringer McIntyre
- Produced by: Michael Stringer McIntyre
- Starring: Brett Kirk and his family Andrew Demetriou; Kevin Sheedy; Mike Sheahan; Peter FitzSimons; Paul Roos; Bachar Houli; John Longmire; David Wenham; Tadhg Kennelly; Adam Goodes
- Distributed by: Second Nature Films
- Release date: 22 July 2014
- Running time: 90 minutes
- Country: Australia
- Language: English

Aussie Rules the World is a 2014 Australian sports documentary film produced by Second Nature Films, directed by Michael Stringer McIntyre and includes interviews with various AFL personalities, including, among others, former Sydney Swans premiership coach and later Melbourne coach Paul Roos, four-time Essendon premiership coach and foundation Greater Western Sydney coach Kevin Sheedy, former AFL CEO Andrew Demetriou, current Richmond player Bachar Houli and incumbent Australian of the Year Adam Goodes.

Filmed over a period of four years between 2011 and 2014, it focuses on the sport of football and its efforts to spread the game worldwide. The film was released on 22 July 2014.

== Background ==
Narrated by David Wenham, who starred as high-profile lawyer Julian McMahon in the 2013 television miniseries Better Man which looked into the real-life execution case of Van Tuong Nguyen, the film follows the journey of recently retired Sydney Swans premiership player Brett Kirk and his family, who embark on a six-month journey around the world to help spread the game across the globe, amid fears that the sport has been largely ignored in favour of other sports such as soccer, rugby union and rugby league.

The 2011 Australian Football International Cup is launched and it includes teams from a wide range of countries including Papua New Guinea, the United States, Ireland, New Zealand, India and South Africa, among many others. Ireland win this tournament, defeating Papua New Guinea in the final which was played as a curtain raiser to the round 23, 2011 AFL match between Hawthorn and the Western Bulldogs.

== Cast ==
Actor	Role
Brett Kirk and his family	Themselves
Paul Roos	Himself
Kevin Sheedy	Himself
Bachar Houli	Himself
Mike Sheahan	Himself
John Longmire	Himself
Adam Goodes	Himself
Tadhg Kennelly	Himself
Andrew Demetriou	Himself
Majak Daw	Himself

== See also ==
- Year of the Dogs
- Kangaroo: A Love-Hate Story
