= Nada's Revolution =

2015 documentary film

Nada's revolution
- Nadas revolutie
- Directed by: Claudia Lisboa
- Written by: Claudia Lisboa dramaturgy Nisrine Mbarki
- Produced by: Frank van den Engel
- Cinematography: Claudia Lisboa
- Edited by: Milika de Jonge, Tell Aulin, Claudia Lisboa
- Music by: Per-Henrik Maenpaa
- Production companies: Zeppers Film with the support of the MEDIAFONDS and the SWEDISH FILM INSTITUTE in co-production with Laika Film & TV, IKON, SVT, Film i Väst
- Distributed by: Women Make Movies
- Release date: 10 February 2015 (The Netherlands)
- Running time: 59'
- Countries: The Netherlands, Sweden, Norway
- Language: Arabic
- Budget: 226.000 EUR

Nada's revolution is a 2015 documentary film by director, cinematographer, and scriptwriter Claudia Lisboa. It is an intimate portrait of a young Egyptian woman fighting for her freedom and independence in a society caught between old traditions and modernisation, against the backdrop of the Arab Spring and its aftermath.

== Background ==
The revolution took away the fear. We learned we can change things if we want to." This was Nada Ahmed's experience of the revolution that deposed Mubarak in 2011 and that's when she decided to make her old dream come true: work with children's theater. The country is paralyzed by political turmoil, caught between the old traditions and modernization. Nada's religious family is not happy with her being nearly thirty and unmarried. When Nada finally finds love and feels ready to marry she is confronted with the same problems her own mother had to deal with.

== The story ==
Nada’s Revolution is an intimate portrait of a young Egyptian woman fighting for her freedom and independence in a society caught between old traditions and modernization. Amidst the political turmoil that has paralyzed the country for almost three years now we follow Nada’s struggle to establish herself as a professional theater maker. At the same time she is haunted by her personal story.

Until the age of 23 Nada led the life her family had chosen for her: she studied to become a primary school teacher and waited to get married. But at that point she decided she did not want to live the life her mother and her grandmother had led. She left her family home for Cairo and started to build up a life of her own. She went from part-time job to part-time job, struggled with male bosses trying to take advantage of her and lived in collectives, moving from flat to flat whenever problems arose. As a young woman without the protection of a male family member, all sorts of problems are routine.

When the revolution broke out in 2011, Nada – like many of her peers – was suddenly full of energy and hope: ‘the impossible doesn’t exist anymore’. She sets out to make her old dream come true: to work with children's theater. She writes a play about the revolution and starts to look for other people to team up with. Meanwhile, Egypt is steeped in political turbulence in the aftermath of the revolution, which the election of President Morsi in 2012 fails to resolve. What seemed possible in the beginning turns out to be much more difficult to attain than Nada imagined. Theaters shut down for lack of an audience, censorship returns to the political agenda, work is even more difficult to find and housing does not improve.

Amidst the chaos Nada finds love, and believes the man of her dreams is going to accept her independence – she wants to marry, have kids and keep working to establish herself as a theater maker. But conservative ideas about gender roles and women's freedom are hard to get rid of, even for the younger generation. Women's rights suffer a backlash in the new government-approved constitution six months after Morsi takes power. On the streets women are systematically harassed and raped during protests. The situation appears hopeless. Nada is confronted with the question of how to stay true to her own dreams and at the same time be loyal to her family and her boyfriend's conservative principles. It is an impossible equation, especially in a society where a woman's leap to adulthood is still made under the auspices of the family. But Nada's only possible answer is to keep fighting and working to make freedom come true.

== Director's statement ==
I’ve followed Nada during three years. In the first year the hope, the joy, the energy the revolution brought with it was contagious. The entire world believed alongside with the Egyptians that their society would change rapidly. As Nada’s life unfolded this hope would become a metaphor for the events that shook her country: the modernization demanded by her generation clashing against the country’s conservative structure. Ultimately, the young women and men had to postpone their hopes for freedom and modernizations. However, the revolution opened up a window and enabled Nada to start pursuing her dream of emancipation. Her fight is not over, nor is her energy spent, and she can set an example for all women her age.
