= Bassey Ekpo Bassey =

Nigerian journalist and politician

Bassey Ekpo Bassey II (born November 1949) is a Nigerian journalist and politician

== Early career ==
Bassey was born in November 1949, son of Etubom Dr EE Bassey a medical doctor and grandson of King James Ekpo Bassey of Cobham Town. He had his early education in Calabar, Onitsha and Lagos. In 1974 he graduated from the University of Nigeria, Nsukka with a degree in journalism. . He followed a journalism career which saw him working in several parts of the country for organizations like the Nigerian Chronicle, The Punch, Newbreed magazine and The Call. Bassey was also for a time vice-president of the Nigerian Union of Journalists, and National Publicity director in the now defunct Nigerian Peoples Party. A socialist, in February 1989 he was head of the Directorate for Literacy and at about the same period he moved from crypto-politics to actual participation when he contested and won the elections for chairmanship of calabar Municipal council. . In 1991 he was a gubernatorial aspirant in Cross River State, running on the Social Democratic Party platform. he was also National vice chairman(south south) for the Alliance for Democracy. He was also a kingmaker in the Efik Kingdom, and on 31 August 1991 he crowned Edidem Nta Elijah Henshaw VI as the Obong of Calabar in controversial circumstances.

In 2004, while chairman of Chairman of Cobham Town Combined Council in Cross River State, Bassey called for the federal government to respect the decision by the International Court of Justice that the Bakassi Peninsula should be ceded to the Republic of Cameroon. In response, the Cross River House of Assembly resolved to withdraw his certificate of recognition as a chief which they had no authority to do.

== Allegation ==
As chairman of the Etubom Traditional Rulers Council, in February 2004 Bassey announced the dethronement of Nta Elijah Henshaw on the grounds that Henshaw had failed to observe traditions and had failed to preserve peace. Henshaw refused to accept the decision, and cast doubts on Bassey's credibility on the basis that he represented a community in Akwa Ibom state whose ruling house no longer existed.

According to traditional rules, although an Obong may be deposed, a new Obong may not be crowned until the previous Obong has died. In April 2008 Bassey accused police of trying to assassinate him. In August 2008 Bassey's home in Calabar was stormed by gunmen, and he narrowly escaped death.
