= Island of Lemurs: Madagascar =

- Theatrical release poster
- Directed by: David Douglas
- Written by: Drew Fellman
- Produced by: Drew Fellman; Diane Roberts
- Narrated by: Morgan Freeman
- Cinematography: David Douglas
- Edited by: Beth Spiegel
- Music by: Mark Mothersbaugh
- Distributed by: IMAX Pictures; Warner Bros. Pictures
- Release date: April 4, 2014 (United States)
- Running time: 41 minutes
- Countries: Canada; United States; Madagascar
- Language: English
- Box office: $13.2 million

Island of Lemurs: Madagascar is a 2014 nature documentary film directed by David Douglas about lemurs in Madagascar. The film was released through Warner Bros. Pictures on April 4, 2014. It is narrated by Morgan Freeman.

== Plot ==
The film takes place on Madagascar, and focuses on lemurs. The film also highlights Dr. Patricia C. Wright's efforts on her mission to help lemurs survive in the modern world. The film also focuses on the endangered levels of lemur species, who are losing their populations due to agricultural fires.

== Release ==
The film was released on April 4, 2014. The film was shot with IMAX 3D cameras, released in IMAX and 3D formats. The film was also released with a G rating by the MPAA, and a U rating by the BBFC.

=== Home media ===
Island of Lemurs: Madagascar was released on Blu-ray 3D + Blu-ray + DVD + Digital HD combo pack on March 31, 2015, by Warner Home Video.

== Reception ==
=== Critical reception ===
The film has received generally positive reviews from critics. Based on 36 reviews collected by Rotten Tomatoes, the film has received an overall rating of 81% and an average score of 6.62/10. The review aggregator, Metacritic, assigned the film a 66/100 score.

Justin Chang of Variety writes that all of the film's combined attributes such as score and cinematography "makes for a pleasant if fairly pedestrian viewing experience, one that more or less gets the job done in terms of balancing the requisite ooh-ahh moments with another unsurprising reminder of man’s capacity for selfishness and destruction." Sheri Linden of The Hollywood Reporter writes that Freeman provided a "concise narration, delivered with avuncular warmth." Nanaimo Daily News praised the cinematography and informative nature of the film, stating, "Island of Lemurs is close to the perfect nature documentary."

A negative review came from Kevin McFarland of The A.V. Club, who graded the film with a C. He wrote that in contrast to Freeman, the narration by Wright was "stilted, overwritten and monotonous", and the film did not go into as much depth as Freeman's Academy Award-winner March of the Penguins, so was therefore "half a movie".

=== Box office ===
According to Box Office Mojo, the film grossed $188,307 on its opening weekend, in which it was released at 37 theaters. As of March 22, 2014, the film has grossed over $9 million.

=== Awards ===
Island of Lemurs was nominated for the Best Documentary and Best Animation/Family poster at the 15th Golden Trailer Awards, which were awarded respectively to Blackfish and Despicable Me 2.

== Music ==
Mark Mothersbaugh scored the film. Chang of Variety wrote that Mothersbaugh's score would " too often surges when silence would have been more effective."

Hanitrarivo Rasoanaivo, a Malagasy native, and her band Tarika sang a local version of American pop songs, featured in the film. "I Will Survive" and "Be My Baby" were among these songs. According to The Hollywood Reporter, the music "conveys the joy of observing the lemurs in action."
