= The Sea Is Behind =

2014 film

- Film poster
- Arabic: البحر من ورائكم
- Directed by: Hicham Lasri
- Written by: Hicham Lasri
- Produced by: Hicham Lasri; Lamia Chraibi
- Starring: Malek Akhmiss
- Cinematography: Said Slimani
- Edited by: Abdessamad Chawkat
- Release date: 14 December 2014 (Dubai IFF)
- Running time: 88 minutes
- Country: Morocco
- Language: Moroccan Arabic

The Sea Is Behind (Arabic: البحر من ورائكم, al-baḥr min warāʾikum) is a 2014 Moroccan drama film directed by Hicham Lasri. It was screened in the Panorama section of the 65th Berlin International Film Festival.

== Plot ==
In a world devoid of color, Tarek, a desperate and disheartened young man with a passion for dance, finds himself exploited by his own father. His father uses Tarek’s love for dancing to force him to perform in women’s costumes atop a horse-drawn cart at popular festivities. As a result, society labels him as sexually deviant, subjecting him to relentless harassment.

At the beginning of the story, Tarek is subjected to senseless violence. He sits in a café, bleeding, his blood mixing with a cup of milk. Soon after, he is arrested on charges of perversion, leading to a brutal interrogation filled with insinuations and psychological torment. Despite his repeated denials, the evidence against him stands tall, cornering him from all sides. Why does he wear women’s makeup? Why does he dance like a woman before a frenzied crowd on a horse-drawn cart? The very horse that once carried him is now old and nearing death, unable to pull the cart any longer, leaving Tarek’s father heartbroken and constantly in tears.

Tarek feels trapped—by his past, his present, and perhaps even his future. He is imprisoned in a merciless homeland, where the oppressive police apparatus indulges in its favorite pastime: torturing bodies, but first, searing souls with humiliation. The only one who shows him any sympathy is a police officer who killed his children and forcibly married his wife. This officer knows that Tarek is not what they accuse him of being, yet he is powerless to help. All he can do is offer small gestures of comfort, wiping away Tarek’s tears. Despite his authority and his history of persecuting those who seek solace in the sea and the open spaces, he himself is defeated—overcome by weakness, helplessness, and the crushing weight of his own suffering. As the story unfolds, we come to understand that he, too, is a victim of a hollow, oppressive system—one that manufactures killers against their will, turning them into soulless machines burdened by their own anguish, suffering more than their victims ever could.

Consumed by the desire for revenge, Tarek resolves to end the officer’s life. He grips the pistol, aims it, but his finger refuses to pull the trigger. He returns to the world he knows, a place where people move yet remain lifeless, a world painted solely in black and white.

When both his closest friend and his father’s horse die on the same day, Tarek realizes that his world will never regain its colors unless he takes a bold step. For the first time, he decides to turn his back on society and face the sea—just as Tariq ibn Ziyad once did when he conquered Andalusia. He follows in the footsteps of those who drowned before him, seeking the embrace of the waves. Only then does Tarek’s world begin to reclaim its lost colors.

== Cast ==
- Malek Akhmiss as Tarik
- Fairouz Amiri as Dalenda
- Mohamed Aouragh as Murad
- Hassan Ben Badida as Daoud
- Salah Bensalah as Lotfi
- Najat Khairallah as The veterinary
- Adil Lasri as Adil
- Yassine Sekkal as Mikhi
- Zineb Smaiki as Mother of Murad
- Hanane Zouhdi as Rita

== See also ==
- List of lesbian, gay, bisexual or transgender-related films of 2015
