= Darwin Shaw =

British actor and filmmaker

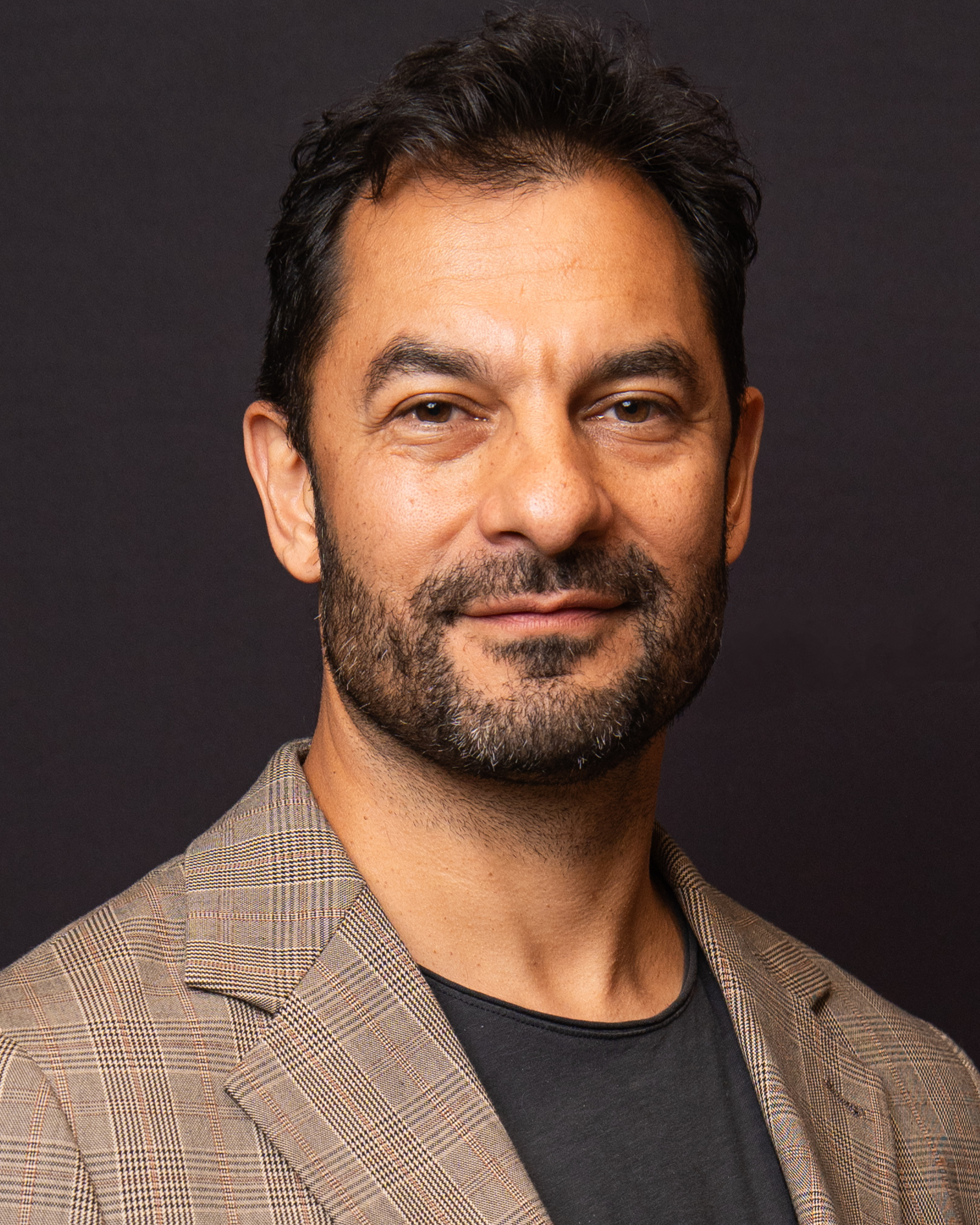
- Shaw in 2025
- Born: Daud Shah; Brampton, England
- Occupations: Actor; Filmmaker; Screenwriter.

Darwin Shaw is a British stage, film and television actor, and director. Formerly practicing as a medical doctor, he retrained as an actor at LAMDA in 2004 after studying theatre in New York City. He was nominated for an Academy Award in 2025 for the Best Live-Action Short Film.

== Early life ==
Shaw, the elder of two boys, was born in Brampton, Cumbria, England. Shaw comes from a background of mixed culture, religion and experiences - his father was born in Amritsar (his paternal grandparents were from Kashmir and Afghanistan) and his mother is British (his maternal grandfather was the local vicar, a relation of Orde Wingate). Shaw grew up in Leeds and later studied at King's College London where he graduated as a medical doctor.

== Career ==
Shaw worked as a doctor at King's College Hospital before retraining in classical theatre at LAMDA. His first professional role was in Deborah Warner's production of Julius Caesar at the Barbican Theatre with a cast which included Ralph Fiennes, Fiona Shaw and Simon Russell Beale. His first feature film role was as Fisher, James Bond's first kill, in the opening of 2006's Casino Royale that introduced Daniel Craig as the new 007, and was directed by Martin Campbell.

He has played in several independent movies including as the jilted fiancée of Bollywood star Lisa Ray in I Can't Think Straight.

Shaw played Asoka in Prince of Persia: The Sands of Time released May 2010 in an action role protecting Princess Tamina (Gemma Arterton) and the dagger of time from Prince Dastan (Jake Gyllenhaal) in the Jerry Bruckheimer and Walt Disney production directed by Mike Newell. Sir Ben Kingsley and Alfred Molina lead the accomplished cast which includes Ronald Pickup, Richard Coyle and Toby Kebbell.

He worked for Pixar in spring 2010 on the film John Carter, with an ensemble cast that included Mark Strong, Willem Dafoe, Taylor Kitsch and Dominic West, and directed by Oscar winner Andrew Stanton. The following year, he appeared in the opening scene of Prometheus directed by Ridley Scott as one of the Elder Engineers.

In other media, Shaw has appeared in the IMAX production, Mummies: Secrets of the Pharaohs with William Hope and Nassar Memazia and in two television movies, Messiah: The Rapture with Marc Warren and Saddam's Tribe with Stanley Townsend and Daniel Mays. Other television appearances include Call the Midwife as Zakir, Trigger Point with Josh Dallas, Endeavour as Prince Nabil and as Augustino in the second series of The Borgias for Showtime with Sean Harris. Shaw was a guest star as the leader of the Hashashin, Hassan-i Sabbah in the Netflix production, Marco Polo.

He made his debut for the Royal Shakespeare Company in 2011 playing Will Scarlet in the premiere of the critically acclaimed The Heart of Robin Hood directed by Gisli Ӧrn Gardarsson of Vesturport, an Icelandic theatre company known for their use of aerial acrobatic skills, in this case corde lisse. He has also performed two plays by Obie award winning playwright Naomi Wallace.

Shaw played the leading role of Saint Peter in the television mini-series, The Bible, produced by Roma Downey and Mark Burnett, which is based on the Bible. It aired on The History Channel in 2013. This role was reprised in the movie Son of God. His first biblical role was as Adam in a 2002 addition to 1979's Jesus which, according to The New York Times, ..."is likely the most-watched motion picture of all time". In a miniseries for Lifetime, he played Benia the husband to the lead, Dinah Rebecca Ferguson in The Red Tent (miniseries).

Shaw played unscrupulous lawyers in Homeland as Ahmed Nazari, with a storyline with Carrie Mathison (Claire Danes) and Allison Carr (Miranda Otto) and also in the final season of House of Cards as Rafiq Nasser opposite Robin Wright (Claire Underwood) and Patricia Clarkson (Jane Davis). He has more recently appeared in Moon Knight with Oscar Isaac and Sugar with Colin Farrell.

== Film-making ==
Shaw is developing an international television anthology titled When The World Stopped. The second film The Last Ranger has won over twenty best live-action drama awards including best narrative short at the Pan-African Film Festival. He was a nominee for the 97th Academy Awards in the best live action shorts category.

== Trivia ==
Shaw has modelled for the photographer David Bailey. His character of Asoka from the film Prince of Persia: The Sands of Time was reproduced as a LEGO figure. He was awarded the gold medal in Advanced Stage Combat by the British Academy of Dramatic Combat.

== Filmography ==
=== Film ===
- Jesus (2002) as Adam
- Casino Royale (2006) as Fisher
- I Can't Think Straight (2008) as Hani
- Prince of Persia: The Sands of Time (2010) as Asoka
- Vamperifica (2011) as Raven
- John Carter (2012) as Matai (Officer)
- Prometheus Elder Engineer (deleted scenes)
- Son of God as Saint Peter
- Dry (2014) as Dr Alex
- Carl and the Janitor (2021)
- The Last Ranger (2025)

=== Television ===
- London's Burning (1 episodes, 2002)
- Mummy Autopsy (1 episode, 2005) as Inca Priest
- Wire in the Blood (1 episode, 2006) as Ahmed Khan
- Saddam's Tribe: Bound by Blood (2007)
- Holby City (1 episode, 2007) as Mohammed Sheik
- Messiah: The Rapture (2008) as Khalid Al Faluni
- Call the Midwife (2012) as Zakir
- The Borgias (1 episode, 2012) as Augustino
- The Bible as Saint Peter
- Endeavour as Crown Prince Nabil
- Atlantis as Prince Therus
- The Red Tent as Benia
- Marco Polo as Sabbah
- Homeland (1 episode, 2015) as Ahmed Nazari
- Agents of S.H.I.E.L.D. (1 episode, 2018) as Qolpakc
- House of Cards (2 episodes, 2018) as Rafiq Nasser
- Moon Knight (1 episode, 2022) as Dornfeld
- Sugar (2 episodes, 2024) as Clinton
