= Thelma Okoduwa =

Nigerian actress

- Born: March 9
- Education: University of Port Harcourt
- Occupation: Actress
- Years active: 2000 to present
- Notable work: Mr and Mrs
- Spouse: Onya Ojiji.

Thelma Okoduwa Ojiji (born March 9) is a Nigerian actress. She was nominated for Africa Movie Academy Award for Best Actress in a Supporting Role in 2012.

== Career ==
In an interview with Encomium Magazine, Thelma revealed that she got into the film industry through Chico Ejiro. In 2017, she acted alongside Norbert Young in The Aggregator. She has featured in many popular television series including Tinsel, Beautiful Liars, Treasures, Spider, and Family Ties. In 2012, she played "Linda" in the romantic drama, Mr and Mrs. After getting married, she revealed that her husband usually evaluates the roles she is to play in a film, and if he doesn't approve, she will reject them. In an interview with The Punch, she cited Joke Silva and Richard Mofe-Damijo are veterans that inspire her in Nollywood. Her role as "Arinola Cardoso" in Africa Magic's Hush was also noted to be the most challenging role in her career due to the difference from her real-life personality. She was also featured in Glo-sponsored Hush.

== Personal life ==
Thelma is a native of Uromi in Edo State. She studied Computer Science at University of Port Harcourt. She also has a diploma in Theater Arts from the same university. In April 2009, she married Onya Ojiji.
