= Emadeldin Elsayed =

Egyptian documentary filmmaker

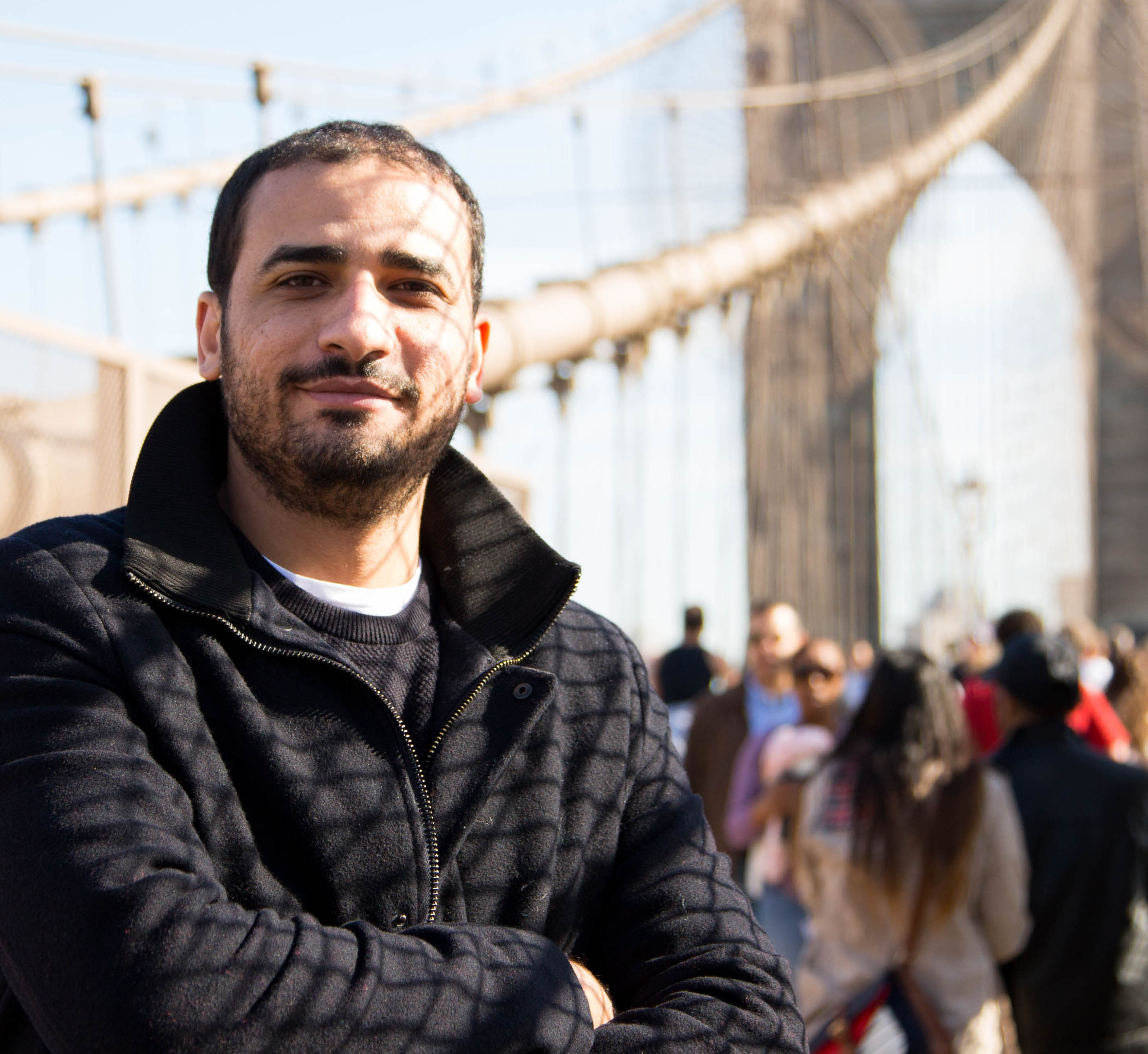
- Elsayed in 2017
- Born: October 17, 1986 (age 39); Alexandria, Egypt
- Education: Alexandria University New York Film Academy
- Occupation: Filmmaker
- Years active: 2011–present
- Employer: Al Jazeera Media Network
- Style: Documentary film

Emadeldin Elsayed (born October 17, 1986) is an Egyptian documentary filmmaker, born in Alexandria, Egypt.

== Early life ==
He studied Pharmacy at the Alexandria University in Egypt, and graduated in 2008. After that he changed his career and studied filmmaking and screenwriting in New York Film Academy.

== Career ==
He works in Al Jazeera Media Network from 2011 till now as a documentary filmmaker.

=== Filmography ===
The Soldiers, Egyptian Conscription Tales (2016). A 52-minute documentary features interviews with Egyptian soldiers detailing what they say are the inhumane conditions that conscripts are forced to work under, and it accuses the army of failing to train its troops properly and feeding them bad food. The documentary provokes outrage among Egyptian regime. Within two hours of the documentary's release on Sunday November 28, a spokesman for Egypt's Ministry of Foreign Affairs was denouncing it on Egyptian television. “It’s obviously poorly done work that is trying to shake the confidence of the Egyptian citizen in his army,” said the spokesman, Ahmed Abu Zeid. Mohamed Saleh, the head of the media office at Qatar's Ministry of Foreign Affairs, declined to respond to Mr. Abu Zeid's comments, saying, “We have nothing to do with this.”. So far, “The Soldiers” has been broadly received as an accurate portrayal of life for military conscripts in Egypt. Criticism of the military's training programs has been growing as a war against Islamic militants in the Sinai Peninsula drags into its fourth year, and tales of conscript abuse are common.

- The Lurker (Almondass) (2014). A 55-minute documentary tells the story of Mohannad, who decided to lurk inside the thugs and pro-Mubarak groups to know their plans to attack the revolutionary demonstrations against the military regime using hidden cameras.
- Beneath the stage(2014): A 30 minutes investigative documentary analyzes the accusation of the Egyptian regime to the Muslim Brotherhood that they killed some people and hided their bodies beneath the stage of Rabaa square sit-in in 2013.
- Al Kahol (2013): A 53 investigative documentary which investigates the frequent buildings collapse in Alexandria city in Egypt.
