= Kelechi Udegbe =

Nigerian actor

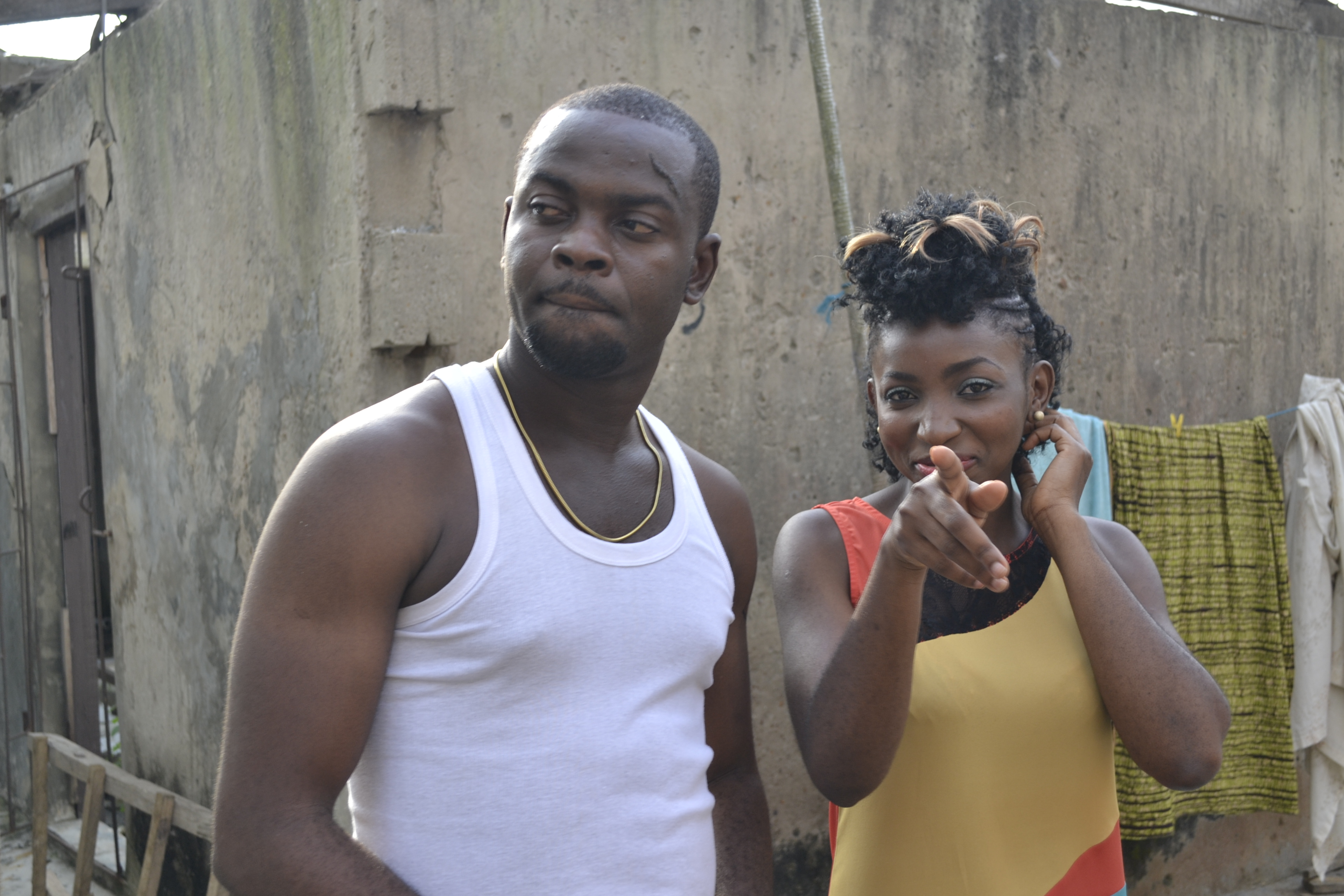
- Udegbe (left) in Ojuju (2014)
- Born: Nigeria
- Occupation: Actor

Kelechi Udegbe is a Nigerian actor. He is best known for starring as the lead character in Officer Titus. Since his screen debut in 2009, Kelechi has starred in several films and soaps including Behind The Smile, Ojuju, Taxi Driver: Oko Ashewo, Horn Free Day and Kpians: The Feast of Souls.

== Education ==
Kelechi went to a boarding school for his secondary school education.

== Career ==
In 2005 the actor enrolled in the Pencil Film and Television Institute (PEFTI) in Lagos for three months. He was drawn to the performances of Martin Lawrence, Will Smith, Eddie Murphy etc. He has featured in movies that have enjoyed positive reception and has been nicknamed The Performer.

== Awards ==
- In 2015 and 2016 he bagged consecutively nominations for Best Actor at the Africa Magic Viewers Choice Awards (AMVCA) for his role in the Ndani TV series Officer Titus.
- Best Actor at the Africa Movie Academy Awards (AMAA) in 2021 for his role as Officer Magnus.

== Personal life ==
The actor was involved in a terrible car accident on 5 November 2023. He made it out alive with minor injuries.

== Filmography ==
Film
| Year | Film | Role | Notes |
|---|---|---|---|
| 2007 | The Faculty | Jude | |
| 2008 | Sleepwalker | Ben | |
| 2010 | Bursting Out | Daniel | — |
| 2013 | Misfit | Orji | |
| 2014 | Kpians: The Feast of Souls | as Dan Mudiagha | Lead role |
| 2014 | Horn Free Day | as Aloysius | — |
| 2014 | Ojuju | as Emmy | — |
| 2015 | Stupid Movie | as Aloysius | — |
| 2015 | Taxi Driver: Oko Ashewo | as Bashar | — |
| 2016 | Men in Trouble | Obinna | |
| 2017 | Love Lost | Tunji | |
| 2018 | Nigerian Prince | Officer Femi | |
| 2019 | The Herbert Macaulay Affair | | |
| 2020 | The Father | Bimbo | |
| 2021 | Cordelia | Major Kawale | |
| 2022 | Man of God | Inspector | |
| 2023 | Orah | Haggard-faced guard | |
| 2024 | KM17 | Officer Risi | |
| 2024 | Shina | Jimoh | |
| 2024 | The Hard Conversations | Asher | |
| 2025 | The Party | | |

== Awards and nominations ==
| Year | Award ceremony | Prize | Result | Ref |
|---|---|---|---|---|
| 2015 | Africa Magic Viewers Choice Awards | Best Actor in a Comedy | Nominated | |
| 2016 | Africa Magic Viewers Choice Awards | Best Actor in a Comedy | Nominated | |
| 2017 | Best of Nollywood Awards | Best Supporting Actor - English | Won | |
| 2018 | Best of Nollywood Awards | Best Actor in a Lead Role - English | Won | |
| 2019 | Best of Nollywood Awards | Best Actor in a Lead Role - English | Nominated | |
| 2019 | Best of Nollywood Awards | Best Supporting Actor - English | Nominated | |
| 2021 | Africa Movie Academy Awards | Best Actor in a Supporting Role | Won | |

== See also ==
- List of Nigerian actors
