= 2014 Ghana Movie Awards =

Ghanaian film awards

The 2014 Ghana Movie Awards were held at the Accra International Conference Center on 30 December 2014.

== Awards ==
Actor in a Leading Role

- John Dumelo – Love or Something Like That
- James Gardiner, Eddie Watson, Elikem Kumordzie – Bachelors
- Adjetey Anang – Devil in the Detail
- Majid Michel – Family Album
- Kwadjo Nkansah (Lilwin) – Made in Agege

Actress in a Leading Role

- Joselyn Dumas – Love or Something Like That
- Jackie Appiah – Sisters at War
- Kafui Danku – Devil in a Dress
- Ama K. Abrebese – Double-Cross
- Yvonne Nelson – Bachelors

Actor in a Supporting Role

- Mikki Osei Berko – Potomanto
- Edward Kuffour – When Love Comes Around
- Kwaku Manu – Last Word
- Kofi Adjorlolo – Family Album
- Chris Attoh – Single Married & Complicated

Actress in a Supporting Role

- Sonia Ibrahim – Shattered Romance
- Marie Humbert – Potomanto
- Nana Ama McBrown – Bachelors
- Kasum Sinari – Family Album
- Rose Mensah (Kyeiwaa) – Odo

Best Actor African Collaboration

- Olu Jacobs – Potomanto
- Okechukwu Ukeje – Love or Something like that
- Jim Iyke – When Love Comes Around
- Alexx Ekubo – Single, Married and Complicated
- Uti Nwachukwu – Devil in a Dress

Best Actress African Collaboration

- Nse Ikpe Etim – Devil in the Detail
- Eku Edewor – When Love Comes Around
- Pierra Makena – When Love Comes Around
- Maria Nepembe – Why Should I Get Married
- Rukky Sanda – If You were Mine

Directing

- Love or Something Like That – Shirley Frimpong-Manso
- Sisters at War – Frank Rajah Arase
- Double-Cross – Pascal Aka
- Shattered Romance – Eddie Nartey
- Single, Married and Complicated – Pascal Amanfo

Editing

- Love or Something Like That – Shirley Frimpong-Manso
- Single Married and Complicated – Okey Benso
- Double-Cross – Pascal Aka
- Family Album – Afla Marley

Cinematography

- Double-Cross – Pascal Aka and Prince Dovlo
- When Love Comes Around – Muyiwa Aluko
- Potomanto – Ken Attoh
- Single Married and Complicated – Tunde Adekoyi
- Why Should I Get Married – Lex Mccarthy

Best Wardrobe and Costume

- Family Album – Samira Yakubu
- Made in Agege – Bernard Adusie & Kenneth Yeboah
- Single Married & Complicated – Clara Ashantiwaa
- If You Were Mine – Adwoa Asankwa
- Love or Something Like That – Ofelia Crossland & Duaba Serwa

Make-Up & Hair Styling

- Love or Something Like That – Selina Asante
- Double-Cross – Nana Ama Atsu
- Had I Know – Jude Odoi
- Bachelors – Lydia Ashitey
- Made in Agege – Faith Evans

Music – Original Score

- Single Married & Complicated – Berni Anti
- Sister at War – Okyeame Kofi
- Why Should I Get Married – DJ Breezy
- If You Were Mine – Seshi Dotse
- Love or Something Like That – Ivan Ayitey & Kofi Boachie – Ansah

Music - Original Song

- Why did I Get Married – Desmond Blackmore & Jane Awindor
- Single, Married & Complicated – Berni Anti
- Sisters at War – Okyeame Kofi
- Made in Agege – Ralph kakari

Best Writing – Original or Adapted Screenplay

- Love or Something Like That – Shirley Frimpong-Manso
- Single, Married & Complicated – Pascal Amanfo
- Shattered Romance – Eddie Nartey
- Bachelors – Maxwell Akwesi Amuni
- When Love Comes Around – Zynnell Zuh & David Amah

Best Production Design

- Family Album – Production Design – Pascal Amanfo; Set Decoration – D. J Vegas
- Last Word – Production Design - Abeam Danso; Set Decoration – Abeam Danso
- Potomanto - Production Design – Shirley Frimpong-Manso; Set Decoration – Ken Attoh
- Devil in a Dress – Production Design - Kafui Danku; Set Decoration – Bismark Odoi

Sound Mixing & Editing

- Bismark The Joke – Abeam Danso
- Family Album – Berni Anti
- Potomanto – Shirley Frimpong-Manso

Discovery of the Year

- Richard Ashanti (Kalybos) – Boys Kasa
- Sammy B – Shattered Romance
- Ahoefe Patricia – Boys Kasa
- Charles Nii Armah Mensah (Shatta Wale) – Never Say Never
- Jane Awindor (Efya) – Why should I Get Married
- Bismarck Odoi – Bachelors

Best Picture

- Why Should I Get Married – Desmond Blackmore (Producer)
- Love or Something Like That – Ken Attoh, Joselyn Dumas & Shirley Frimpong-Manso (Producers)
- Bachelors – Sallam Abdul (Producer)
- Single, Married & Complicated – Yvonne Nelson (Producer)
- Devil in a Dress – Kafui Danku (Producer)
- Shattered Romance – Juliet Ibrahim (Producer)
- Double-Cross – D.R Kuffour & Ama K. Abebrese (Producers)
- When Love Comes Around – Zynnell Zuh (Producer)
- Family Album – Hajia Hawa Meizongo (Producer)
- If You Were Mine – Kobi Bartels (Producer)

Short Movie

- King Agokoli
- Ebola
- Missing Mother
- Ghana Police
- The Adventures kalybos

TV Series

- High School (GH One)
- Abrabo (UTV)
- Efiewura (Adom TV & TV3)
- Yellow Café (GTV & Afro Star TV)
- Afia Schwarzenegger (Viasat 1)

TV Series Actress

- Jasmine Baroudi – Heart Break Hotel (TV3)
- Gloria Sarfo – Living with Trisha (Viasat 1)
- Maame Boateng – Chorkor Trotro (TV3)
- Ahoefe Patricia – Boys Kasa (TV3 & UTV)
- Victoria Michael – Office palava
- Valentina Nana Agyeiwaa

TV Series Actor

- Derrick Kobina Boateng – High School (GH One)
- Kojo Nkwansah (Lilwin) – Abrabo (UTV)
- Kwame Djokoto – Efiewura (TV3)
- Prince Yawson – Chorkor Trotro (TV3)
- David Oscar – Peep (TV3)

Favorite Actor

- Majid Michel
- Prince David Osei
- John Dumelo
- Van Vicker
- Kojo Nkwansah (Lilwin)
- Kwaku Manu
- Akwasi Boadi (Akrobeto)
- James Gardiner
- Kofi Adu
- Richard Ashanti (Kalybos)

Favorite Actress

- Yvonne Nelson
- Jackie Appiah
- Nadia Buari
- Yvonne Okoro
- Maame Serwaa
- Rose Mensah (Kyeiwaa)
- Nana Ama McBrown
- Juliet Ibrahim
- Emelia Brobbey
- Rosely Ngissah
