= Gold Coast Lounge =

Ghanaian film

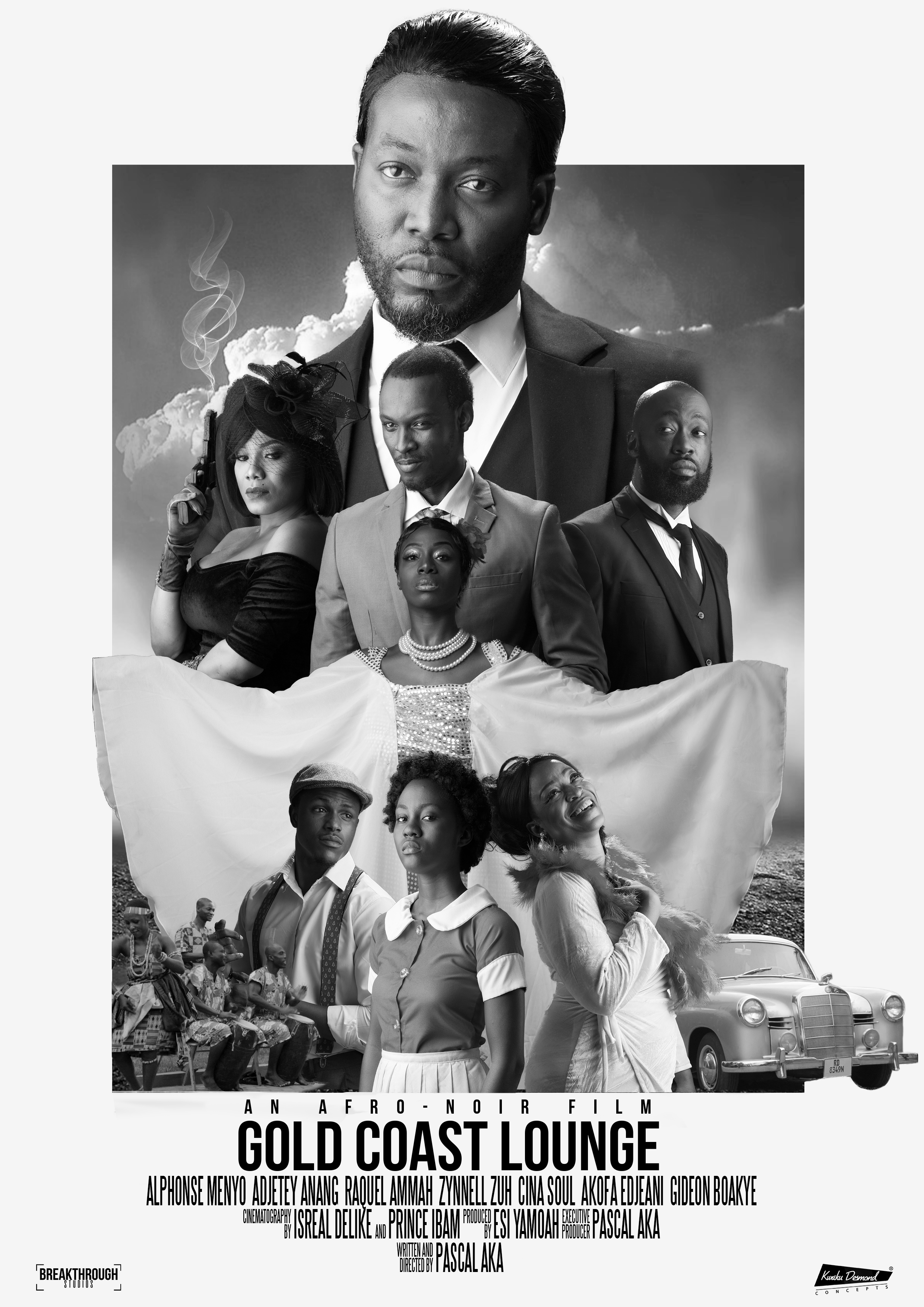
- Poster
- Directed by: Pascal Aka
- Starring: Adjetey Anang; Fred Nii Amugi; Akofa Edjeani Asiedu; Alphonse Menyo; Cina Soul; Zynnell Zuh
- Release date: 2020
- Country: Ghana
- Language: English

Gold Coast Lounge is a 2020 Ghanaian neo-noir film written and directed by Pascal Aka, who also stars in the film. Other featured actors include Alphonse Menyo, Adjetey Anang, Zynnell Zuh, and Raquel.

== Synopsis ==
The Gold Coast Lounge, run by John Donkor’s crime syndicate, is a popular haunt for the criminal element of colonial Ghana. With the independence of the country looming, the Lounge is threatened with closure by the new government. At this time, Donkor himself is in prison, with the lounge being managed by Donkor’s lieutenants, Daniel and Wisdom.

Both taken in from a young age by Donkor, Daniel and Wisdom soon developed a fierce rivalry that continues to this day. The rivalry only intensified as Donkor considers Daniel his heir apparent, alienating Wisdom further.

After their leader is killed, the eldest must take over; then comes insurrection and criminal investigation.

== Cast ==
- Alphonse Menyo as Daniel
- Pascal, also known as Wisdom
- Raquel Ammah as Rose
- Fred Nii Amugi as Inspector Adwene Mu Ti
- Adjetey Anang as John Donkor
- Akofa Edjeani Asiedu as Auntie Adjoa
- Gideon Boakye as Yaw
- Etta JoMaria as Daniel's Sister
- Cina Soul as Ama
- Zynnell Zuh as Akatua

== Awards ==
In 2019, the movie won eight awards at the Ghana Movie Awards and also won six awards at the Golden Movie Awards in 2020.
