= Eddie Coffie =

Ghanaian actor (1959–2015)

- Born: 1959
- Died: 2015 (aged 55–56)
- Citizenship: Ghanaian
- Notable work: Sinking Sands
- Children: 3

Eddie Cofie (1959–2015) was a Ghanaian actor, president of the Ghana Actors Guild, and also a pastor. He featured in many Ghanaian movies like Bob Smith's Diabolo, Dirty Tears, Sinking Sands and A Northern Affair.

== Career ==
In 1992, Coffie featured in many Ghanaian movies like Bob Smith's Diabolo, which he played the main role as the snake-pastor who turns into a strange creature devouring raw eggs and suffering from Hallucinations. He went on and featured in several movies including Dirty Tears in 1996 and both Dangerous Game II and The Suspect in 1997. He also featured in the multiple award-winning movies Sinking Sands in 2011 and A Northern Affair in 2014. In 2014, he also featured in the Ghanaian-Nigerian movie My Taxi Soul starring alongside Martha Ankomah, Kalsoume Sinare and Eddie Watson.

== Ghana Actors Guild ==
In October 2014, Coffie was elected as the president of the Ghana Actors Guild after garnering 93 votes out of 166 votes cast. He served in that role until he died in 2015. He was a member of the Ghana Culture Forum Outreach taskforce team with veteran actress and politician Dzifa Gomashie serving as the team leader. Through his role as president of the Ghana Actors Guild, he worked as a key member of the creative arts executives along with Ghana Music Rights Organization president Kojo Antwi and Musicians Union of Ghana president Bice Obour to ensure the introduction of Insurance for entertainers in Ghana.

== Filmography ==
- Diabolo (1992)
- Fatal Decision (1993)
- Who Killed Nancy? (1995)
- Sarah II (1995)
- Candidates for Hell (1996)
- Dirty Tears (1996)
- Dangerous Game II (1997)
- The Suspect (1997)
- Be Vigilant (1997) as Pastor
- Prince of Doom II (1997) as Pastor
- Burning Desire 2 (2002) as Jackson
- Asoreba 1&2 (2005) as Head Pastor
- Asoreba 3&4 (2006) as Head Pastor
- Princess Tyra (2007) as Elder
- Girl's Connection (2008) as James
- Dons in Sakawa (2009) as Pastor James
- Mallam Issah (2010) as Pastor Asante
- Sinking Sands (2011) as Obed
- Burning Desire (2012) as Jackson
- The Power of Buttocks (2013)
- A Northern Affair (2014) as Esaba's Attorney
- My Taxi Soul (2014)
- Bump (2021 TV Series) as Talia's Dad

== Personal life ==
Coffie had three children; two sons and a daughter. On 30 October 2015, he died of high blood pressure at the Ridge Hospital. He was buried on 19 December 2015, with his final funeral rites taking place at the Azumah Nelson Sports Complex, Kaneshie. With his role and contribution to the arts and creative and theatre industry, he was given a state burial by the government of Ghana through the Ministry of Tourism, Culture, and Creative Arts contributing to the funeral and representing the government in organizing the funeral through the Substantive Minister, Elizabeth Ofosu-Agyare and her deputy Dzifa Gomashie.

His funeral was well attended by several musicians and actors including Nii-Odoi Mensah, Rose Mensah (Kyeiwaa), Prince Yawson (Waakye) and Augustine Abbey (Idikoko) Bill Asamoah, Emelia Brobbey, Grace Nortey, Kojo Dadson, Kalsoume Sinare, Barima Sidney and British Ghanaian Actor Danny Erskine.
