= 2011 Ghana Movie Awards =

Ghanaian movie award ceremony

The 2011 Ghana Movie Awards was the second edition of the ceremony to reward film practitioners in the Ghana Film Industry. The event was held at Accra International Conference center on 25 December 2011. Winners included Kimberly Elise, Majid Michel, Somewhere in Africa. Ties That Bind had 21 nominations and eventually won 9 awards to top the winners list. Olu Jacobs received the Lifetime Achievement Award.

== Awards ==
=== Categories ===
Best Actor In A Leading Role (English)

- Van Vicker – Paparazzi
- Majid Michel – Somewhere in Africa
- Chris Attoh – 6 Hours To Christmas
- Samuel Ofori – Fake London Boy
- Rahim Banda - Behind The Mask

Best Actor In A Leading Role (Local)

- Apostle John Prah – The Holy Bible
- Bill Asamoah – Barfour
- Kwaku Manu – Village Champion
- Ebenezer Donkor – God Father
- Agya Koo – Agenkwah
- Isaac Amoako – Emmanuel

Best Actress In A Leading Role (English)

- Jackie Appiah – Reason To Kill
- Joselyn Canfor Dumas – Adams Apple 2
- Kimberly Elise - Ties That Bind
- Yvonne Okoro – Why Marry
- Omotola Jalade Ekeinde – Ties That Bind
- Lydia Forson – Masquerades

Best Actress In A Leading Role (Local)

- Vivian Jill – Yaw Donkor
- Emelia Brobbey – Obi Yaa
- Nana Ama McBrown – Wunni Pannie Due
- Linda Abbey – Agya Koo Salamatu
- Portia Asare Boateng – Ama Bonsu

Best Actor In A Supporting Role (English)

- Eddie Nartey – Somewhere in Africa
- John Dumelo – Ties That Bind
- Adjetey Anang – Adams Apple 3
- Majid Michel – Somewhere in Africa
- Gavivina Tamakloe – For Better For War

Best Actor In A Supporting Role (Local)

- Clement Bonney – Ama Bonsu
- Joseph Osei – Osofo Amoako
- Osei Tutu Nyamese – Wunni Pannie Due
- Akwasi Boadi – Emmanuel
- David Asuman – Diawuo
- Fredrick Eghan – Agya Koo Gbengbentus

Best Actress In A Supporting Role (English)

- Roselyn Ngissah – Somewhere in Africa
- Helen Asante – Adams Apple 3
- Yvonne Nelson – 4 Play Reloaded
- Martha Ankomah – Bed Of Roses
- Nadia Buari – Who Owns The City

Best Actress In A Supporting Role (Local)

- Mercy Asiedu – Obi Yaa
- Rose Mensah – Bu Bra Pa
- Maame Serwaa – So, So And So
- Ellen Kyei Whyte – Evil Soul
- Jane Ackun – Otufoo

Best Picture

- Bed Of Roses
- Ties That Bind
- Single Six
- Somewhere in Africa
- Adams Apple
- Who Owns The City
- Kofi Agenkwa
- Emmanuel
- Masquerades
- Agyaa Koo Gbengbentus

Best Directing [English Language]

- Frank Rajah Arase – Somewhere in Africa
- Shirley Frimpong-Manso – Adams Apple
- Leila Djansi & Kevin Huie – Ties That Bind
- Pascal Amanfo – Bed Of Roses
- Samuel Ofori – Fake London Boy

Best Directing (Local)

- Frank Gharbin – Emmanuel
- Nana Ama Mcbrown – Obi Yaa
- Augustine Abbey – Agya Koo Gbengbentus
- Jonas Agyemang – Village Champion
- Samuel Nkansah – God Father

Best Art Direction

- Kofi Agenkwa
- Ties That Bind
- Somewhere in Africa
- Adams Apple 2
- Who Owns The City
- Black Man, White Brother

Best Music - (Original Song)

- "Agya Koo Gbengbentus" – Mframa
- "Fake London Boy" – Tiffany
- "Sexy Sassy Wahala" (Adams Apple) – Efya
- "Ties That Bind" – Dela & Okyeame Quophi
- "Paparazzi" – Kobby Maxwell
- "Somewhere In Africa" – Bennie Anti

Best Movie Africa Collaboration

- 6 Hours To Christmas
- Masquerades
- Ties That Bind
- Single Six
- Who Owns The City

Best Cameo Actor

- Kwaku Sintim Misa – Adams Apple 1
- Kofi Okyere Darko – Adams Apple 1
- Abeeku Santana – Death After Birth
- Majid Michel – Adams Apple 4
- Okyeame Kwame – Ties That Bind
- Kofi Adjorlolo – Somewhere in Africa

Best Cameo Actress

- Juliet Ibrahim – 4 Play Reloaded
- Grace Nortey – Adams Apple
- Khareema Aguiar – Ties That Bind
- Lily Ameyaw – Otuofoo

Best Story

- Ties That Bind
- Kofi Agenkwah
- Adams Apple
- Somewhere in Africa
- Death After Birth
- C.E.O.

Best Editing

- 4 Play Reloaded
- Adams Apple
- Ties That Bind
- Somewhere in Africa
- God Father

Best Cinematography

- 4 Play Reloaded
- Adams Apple
- Ties That Bind
- Bed Of Roses
- Somewhere in Africa

Best Costume & Wardrobe

- Osofo Amoako
- Kofi Agenkwah
- Ties That Bind
- Adams Apple
- Queens Pride

Best Make-Up

- Adams Apple
- Somewhere in Africa
- Ties That Bind
- Grave Yard
- Who Owns The City

Best Visual Effects

- God Father
- Dirty Game
- Grave Yard
- Kofi Agenkwah
- Paparazzi

Best Discovery

- Kwaku Manu – So, So And So
- Mzbel – Single Six
- Jasmine Baroudi – Adams Apple
- Ama K. Abebrese – Ties That Bind
- James Gardiner – C.E.O.

Best Music - (Original Score)

- Ties That Bind
- Somewhere in Africa
- Adams Apple
- Emmanuel
- Agya Koo Gbengbentus

Best Sound Editing & Mixing

- Ties That Bind
- Adams Apple
- 4 Play Reloaded
- Paparazzi

Best Writing Adapted Or Original Screenplay

- Somewhere in Africa
- Ties That Bind
- Adams Apple
- Ama Bonus
- Who Owns The City

Best Actor Africa Collaboration

- Ramsey Nouah – Memories Of My Heart
- Desmond Elliot – Masquerades
- Omar Oumson – Who Owns The City
- Mike Ezuruonye – Private Enemy
- Eddie Watson – Single Six

Best Actress Africa Collaboration

- Mercy Johnson – My Husband's Funeral
- Omotola Jalade Ekeinde – Ties That Bind
- Ebbe Bassey – Ties That Bind
- Tonto Dikeh – Private Enemy
- Damilola Adegbite – 6 Hours To Christmas

=== Special awards ===
Favorite TV Actor

- Funnyface Benson - Chokor Trotro

Favorite TV Series

- Chorkor Trotro

Favorite Actress-Movie

- Martha Ankomah

Favorite Actor-Movie

- Prince David Osei

Lifetime Achievement Award

- Olu Jacobs
