= V Republic =

Ghanaian TV series

- Directed by: Shirley Frimpong-Manso
- Starring: Nikki Samonas, Joselyn Dumas, Christabel Ekeh, Jasmine Baroudi
- Country of origin: Ghana
- Original language: English
- No. of episodes: 26

Production
- Production locations: Accra, Ghana

Original release
- Release: 2014 – 2015

V-Republic was a 26-episode television series from Ghana which ran from 2014 to 2015. V-Republic started in October 2014 as a web series, director Shirley Frimpong-Manso turned to video-on-demand in search of an audience which crossed national borders in Africa. The series ran until 2015.

It starred Nikki Samonas, Joselyn Dumas, Christabel Ekeh and Jasmine Baroudi. At the 2015 Golden Movie Awards, the performance of Samonas and Baroudi won them nominations for best TV series actress, while Senanu Gbedawo and James Gardner were nominated for best TV series actor. Samonas and Baroudi were again nominated at the 2016 Golden Movie Awards.

== Synopsis ==
The series followed the lives of four professional women from Accra.

== Cast ==
- Nikki Samonas as Gina
- Joselyn Dumas as Mansa Baiden
- Christabel Ekeh as Laura
- Jasmine Baroudi as Tilly Walsh
- Kweku Elliot as Frank
- Nana Frimpong as Danny
- James Gardiner as Oliver Quist
- Mawuli Gavor as Lenny
- Alero George as Tayo
- Akofa Edjeani Asiedu as Shirley
- Narsh Alexei Smith as William
- Ecow Smith-Asante as James Baiden
