= Azali =

Azali may refer to:

- an adherent of Subh-i-Azal
- Azali (tribe), ancient Illyrian tribe
- Azali (film), 2018 film directed by Kwabena Gyansah
- Azali, a given name notably borne by
  - Azali Assoumani (born 1959), President of the Comoros
