= Ties That Bind (film) =

Ties that Bind
- Theatrical Poster
- Directed by: Leila Djansi
- Written by: Leila Djansi
- Produced by: Theodore Baidoo; Winrick KolbeJulia Djansi
- Starring: Kimberly Elise; Omotola Jalade Ekeinde; Ama K. Abebrese; John Dumelo; Ebbe Bassey
- Cinematography: Wes Cardino
- Edited by: Avril Buekes
- Music by: Thomas Vanoosting
- Production company: Turning Point Media Productions
- Distributed by: Turning Point Pictures
- Release date: December 5, 2011 (AFRIFF)
- Countries: USA, Ghana
- Language: English
- Budget: $2,000,000 (estimated)

Ties that Bind is a 2011 drama film directed by Leila Djansi and starring Kimberly Elise, Omotola Jalade Ekeinde and Ama K. Abebrese. It was filmed in Ghana. It was nominated in 21 categories at the 2011 Ghana Movie Awards, and won 9 awards. It received 7 nominations at the 8th Africa Movie Academy Awards and eventually won the award for the category Achievement in Screenplay.

== Cast ==
- Kimberly Elise as Theresa Harper
- Ama K. Abebrese as Buki Ocansey
- Omotola Jalade Ekeinde as Adobea Onyomena
- John Dumelo as Lucas Morison
- Ebbe Bassey as Maa Dede
- Kofi Adjorlolo as Father
- Fiifi Coleman as Eddie
- Eddie Nartey as Godknows
- Khareema Aguiar as Estelle
- Randall Batinkoff as Dan Dubick
- David Dontoh as Koo
- Dave Harper as Dr. Saunders
- Paulina Oduro
- Kofi Middleton Mends as Priest
- Fred Amugi
- Okyeame Kwame as Seun Baka
- Grace Nortey as Church Member
- Angel Etse
- Kofi Asamoah
- Ziggy Nettyson as Worried Husband

== Reception ==
The film received mostly positive reviews from critics, especially for its acting and directing. Nollywood Reinvented gave it a 79% rating and wrote on the transition of the script "It is one thing to write a story, Any story… anyone can do it… once upon a time… and that is the end of my story. But it’s a whole other ball game to construct a story in which every little detail ties together. A story like this is a story in which the characters need not tell us what to feel, you feel it regardless. The story is really sad, and just when you think it can’t possibly get any sadder. It does! It’s an incredibly easy and quick watch… ".
