= Agony of Christ (film) =

Agony Of Christ
- Directed by: Frank Rajah Arase
- Written by: Abdul Salam Mumuni
- Produced by: Abdul Salam Mumuni
- Production company: Venus Films Production
- Release date: 2009
- Country: Ghana
- Language: English

Agony of Christ is a 2009 Ghanaian film directed by Frank Rajah Arase.

== Plot ==
A young man ran away from his village because the traditional priestess wanted him killed. He was saved by Christians who trained him in the knowledge of Christianity and he became born again. He returned to his village where they were worshippers of lesser gods. His task of converting everyone in the village into a Christian was thwarted by the priestess of the land, who did not allow that to happen thereby engaging him in a spiritual battle.

== Cast ==
- Majid Michel
- Nadia Buari
- Kofi Adjorlolo
- Eddie Nartey
- Naana Hayford
- Solomon Sampah
- Yvonne Okoro
- Kofi Adjorlolo
- Samuel Nii Odoi Mensah
- Prince David Osei
