= Hire a Man =

2016 Nigerian romantic comedy film

- Directed by: Desmond Elliot
- Written by: Writers Ink
- Story by: Chinneylove Eze
- Produced by: Chinneylove Eze
- Starring: Zynnell Zuh; Enyinna Nwigwe; IK Ogbonna; Nancy Isime; Bayray McNwizu; Daniel Lloyd
- Cinematography: Isaac Garland
- Edited by: Shola Ayorinde
- Music by: Just Beats
- Distributed by: Film One
- Release date: 10 February 2016
- Running time: 101 minutes
- Country: Nigeria
- Language: English

Hire a Man is a 2016 Nigerian romantic comedy film written by Temitope Bolade, Diche Enunwa, and Chinneylove Eze and directed by Desmond Elliot and produced by Chinneylove Eze. The film stars the Ghanaian actress Zynnell Zuh and Nollywood actors and actresses such as Enyinna Nwigwe, IK Ogbonna, Nancy Isime, Bayray McNwizu and Daniel Lloyd. The movie portrays the pressure put on ladies to get married when age begins to step in, by the society.

== Production ==
The film was produced by Chinneylove Eze Productions Ltd.

== Plot ==
In the movie, after the wedding engagement announcement by her younger, prettier, and skinnier sister, Tinu (Nancy Isime), the spoilt rich successful accountant, Tishe Lawson (Zynnell Zuh), hires Jeff (Enyinna Nwigwe) to pretend to be her fiancé. The showdown stage just got ready!

== Cast ==
- Zynnell Zuh as Teshi Lawson
- Enyinna Nwigwe as Jeff
- IK Ogbonna as Benjamin
- Nancy Isime as Teni Lawson
- Bayray McNwizu as Sonia
- Daniel Lloyd as Mike
- Shaffy Bello as Mrs. Lawson
- Keppy Ekpenyong Bassey as Mr. Lawson
- Atewe Raphael as Victor
- Simon M. Sichert as Steve
- Olasimbo Yetunde as Tara
- David Uzoma Aboy, as David
- Desmond Elliot

== Release ==
The movie was released on 10 February 2016 and was announced to be premiered in cinemas throughout Nigeria by 24 February 2017.
