= Jasmine Baroudi =

Ghanaian actress

Jasmine Jamila Baroudi
- Born: Jasmine Baroudi; September 16; Ghana
- Education: University of Ghana
- Occupations: Actress, Psychologist
- Known for: A new Flame, The cell, Double-cross, Broken Mirror, Adam's Apple
- Spouse: Williams Ofori Atta
- Awards: Golden Movie award Best supporting actress, 2011 Ghana movie award best discovery category

Jasmine Jamila Baroudi (born September 16) is a Ghanaian actress. She studied Psychology at the University of Ghana where she graduated.

== Career ==
She was featured in the Ghanaian TV Series, Adam's Apples (2011–2012) and acted alongside Ghallywood actors and actresses such as Majid Michel. She was later nominated in the Best Discovery category at the 2011 Ghana Movie Awards for this TV Series.

In 2014, she starred in the film directed by Mikki Osei-Berko titled, Broken Mirror, also featuring Jackie Appiah, James Gardiner, Fred Amugi and Roselyn Ngissah, and produced by David Owusu.

Between 2014 and 2015, she was featured as Tilly Walsh in the Shirley Frimpong-Manso-directed Television Series, V-Republic. Other stars include: Nikki Samonas, Joselyn Dumas and Christabel Ekeh.

She was nominated in the 2014 Ghana Movie Awards in the Best TV Series Actress category, for the TV Series, Heart Break Hotel on TV3 Ghana.

She was the winner in the Best Supporting Actress - Drama category of the 2019 Golden Movie Awards (GMA). She starred in the film, The Cell, in the same year.

She was starred in the 2019 film, A New Flame. Other Ghanaian stars featured include: Richard Asante (Kalyboss) and Edinam Atatsi.

== Filmography ==
Year	Film	Role	Notes	Ref.
2023	Madam		TV Series	
2022	Mirage		Drama	
2021	Famous	Anto	Drama	
2020	Eden	Rachael	TV Series	
2019	The Cell	Actress		
2019	A New Flame	Actress (Naa Kai)	Comedy, Drama	
2014–2015	V-Republic	Actress (Tilly Walsh)	TV series	
2014	Double-Cross	Actress (Vickie Mensah)	Thriller	
2014	Broken Mirror	Actress		
2012 -	Adam's Apples	Actress	TV series	
2012	Contract	Nadia		

== Accolades ==
Year	Event	Prize	Recipient	Result
2019	GMA	Golden Supporting Actress - Drama	Herself	Won
2014	GMA	Golden TV Series Actress - Drama	Herself	Nominated
2011	GMA	Golden Discovery	Herself	Nominated

== Controversies ==
Baroudi issued stern warnings to men who she threatened to "name and shame" who sent her pictures of their manhood online, viewing it as an act of cyberbullying.

Graphic Showbizz reported her stating that the use of unprofessional actors who are so many make the film industry not to grow, recommending that producers only put those qualified on the screen.

== Personal life ==
She is married to Williams Ofori Atta.
