= William Kojo Agbeti =

Ghanaian Cinematographer

- Education: Bachelor's Degree in Theatre Arts from the University of Ghana in 2013.
- Years active: 2009-Present
- Known for: Azali
- Notable work: Azali, The Queen of Akra
- Television: The Queen of Akra
- Awards: Panafrican Film and Television Festival of Ouagadougou in 2017 for Best Motion

William Kojo Agbeti is a Ghanaian Cinematographer, Director and Producer known for his work on "The Queen of Akra" and Azali.

== Early life and education ==
William is an alumnus of the University of Ghana, where he studied Theatre Arts with a final year specialisation in Radio, Television, Film and Video. He graduated with Bachelor of Fine Arts Honours in 2013.

== Career ==
His career began in 2013 when he made his short film Komabu-Za, about the Ewe migration. It was adjudged the best in the documentary category at the 3rd Francophone film festival in 2015. In 2019, he released "Nirvana" a short-film that tells the story of a Nyanu, a 12-year-old boy desires to attain the highest level in education by winning “The Queen’s Scholarship” to study abroad. The boy's father objects to the son's education and forbids him to ever go to school. This featured at the Black Star International Film Festival.

Also in 2019, William worked as a cinematographer and editor in the long narrative "Azali". It directed by Kwabena Gyansah and featured at the Luxor African Film Festival. Azali was selected and submitted for consideration at the 2020 Oscars.

In 2024, William released his series, The Queen of Akra.

== Awards ==
In 2018, William won in the cinematography category of the Ghana Movie Awards for his film, Azali. He won in the same category for his work on Azali at the Golden Movie Awards.

The following year, William won the Best Short movie at the 9th Edition of the Ghana Movie Awards.
