= Kofi Adjorlolo =

Ghanaian actor and producer

- Born: 14 June 1956 (age 70); Keta– Volta region Ghana
- Education: Keta Senior High Technical School
- Occupation: Actor
- Years active: 1980–present
- Awards: International Golden Image award

Kofi Adjorlolo (born 14 June 1956) is a veteran Ghanaian actor, producer and media personality who has made significant contributions to the Ghanaian entertainment industry, particularly in film and television.

He has been nominated once for Best Actor in a Lead Role at the Ghana Movie Awards and four times for Best Actor in a Supporting Role at the Ghana Movie Awards, Africa Movie Academy Awards, and Africa Magic Viewers Choice Awards. Among the awards he has received are the International Golden Image award from then Liberian President Ellen Johnson Sirleaf, and the Best Cameo Actor at the 2011 Ghana Movie Awards.

== Early life and education ==
Adjorlolo was born in Keta in the Volta region of Ghana. From a young age, he exhibited a keen interest in the arts, particularly in music, which later evolved into a passion for acting. Adjorlolo pursued his education in Ghana, attending the Keta Senior High Technical School.

Adjorlolo completed African Methodist Episcopal (AME) Zion School in Keta, Ghana, and gained admission to Keta Senior High Technical School before obtaining his sixth form certificate from Ebenezer Secondary School, Dansoman. He also attended University of Ghana, where he holds a bachelor's degree in mass communication.

== Career ==
Adjorlolo began his career as a musician, playing instruments including trumpet and organ. In his twenties, he travelled to Nigeria and played with the Nigerian musician Victor Uwaifo of Joromi fame. He has also performed with the legendary Felix Bell. On returning to Ghana, he formed the Osagyefo band and played with the Dasebre band. He worked as a civil servant and a radio presenter at the Ghana Broadcasting Corporation and Peace FM. He was instrumental in establishing the religious radio station (Channel R) and was honored by radio station HOT 93.9FM in Accra for 30 years of service to the showbiz industry. He joined the Ghanaian film industry in 2003.

Adjorlolo’s entry into the entertainment industry was through music, where he played with notable bands like the Uhuru band and the Osagyefo band. His music career was marked by a flair for performance, which he transitioned into acting in the late 1990s. Adjorlolo’s early acting roles in Ghanaian films made him a household name, as he brought a unique blend of gravitas and charisma to the screen. His ability to embody various characters with authenticity helped him carve out a niche in the burgeoning Ghanaian film industry.

== Notable works and achievements ==
Over the years, Adjorlolo has starred in numerous films, both in Ghana and Nigeria, earning critical acclaim for his performances. His roles in movies like; The Will, Ties that Bind, and Single and Married are particularly noteworthy. Adjorlolo’s performances have earned him several awards, including the Ghana Movie Awards and nominations at the Africa Movie Academy Awards. He also participated in many Ghallywood movies with Yvonne Nelson, Jackie Appiah, John Dumelo, Van Viker, Nadia Buari, Majid Michel, and many other Ghanaian celebrities.

His contributions to both the Ghanaian and Nigerian film industries have contributed to his status as a veteran actor with a legacy. Adjorlolo’s influence is expected to continue shaping the generations of Ghanaian actors, ensuring that his contribution to the industry endures.

== Impact on the Ghanaian film industry ==
Adjorlolo’s influence on the Ghanaian film industry cannot be overstated. As one of the pioneering actors of his generation, he played a crucial role in the evolution of the industry from a nascent sector to a more structured and recognized one. Adjorlolo has been a mentor to many young actors, offering guidance and sharing his wealth of experience. His presence in the industry has also helped to bridge the gap between the Ghanaian and Nigerian film markets, fostering collaborations and cross-cultural productions.

== Personal life and philanthropy ==
Beyond his career, Adjorlolo is known for his philanthropic efforts, particularly in supporting education and health initiatives in his hometown of Keta. He has often used his platform to advocate for social issues, emphasizing the importance of giving back to the community. His personal life, although occasionally highlighted in the media, remains relatively private, with Adjorlolo focusing more on his professional and charitable activities.

== Selected filmography ==
Year	Title	Role	Notes
2003	The Chosen One Part 1&2	Deacon Prempeh	
2006	My Mother's Heart	Boakye	Nominated for Best Actor (Supporting Role) at the 2nd Africa Movie Academy Awards
2006	Mummy's Daughter		
2007	Princess Tyra	King	
2009	Heart of Men	Bernard	
2009	Agony of Christ		
2010	The Beast	Dr. Brooks	Nominated for Best Actor in a Supporting Role (English) at the 2010 Ghana Movie Awards
2011	Ties that Bind	Father	
2011	Somewhere in Africa	General Olemba	Winner, Best Cameo Actor at the 2011 Ghana Movie Awards
2012	Adesuwa (A Wasted Lust)		
2012	Single and Married	Ranesh	
2012	Wipe My Tears		Nominated for Best Actor in a Lead Role (English) at the 2012 Ghana Movie Awards
2014	Family Album		Nominated for Best Actor in a Supporting Role at the 2014 Ghana Movie Awards
2014	A Northern Affair		
2015	Code of Silence		
2015	Falling	Mr Mazi Mba	
2016	Ghana Must Go	father	Nominated for Best Supporting Actor Movie/TV series at the 2017 Africa Magic Viewers Choice Awards
2017	Crime Suspect		
2018	That Night		
2019	Hero: Inspired by the Extraordinary Life and Times of Mr. Ulric Cross	Asantehene	
2020	Aloe Vera	Papa Aloe	
2023	A Taste of Sin	Bishop	

== See also ==
- Ghana Movie Awards
