= Sinking Sands =

- Directed by: Leila Djansi
- Written by: Leila Djansi
- Produced by: Leila Djansi; Theodore Baidoo
- Starring: Jimmy Jean-Louis; Ama Abebrese; Yemi Blaq
- Cinematography: Adrian Correia
- Edited by: Asher Bingham; Howard Heard
- Music by: Koo Nimo; Jacob Yoffee
- Release date: 2010
- Running time: 105 minutes
- Country: Ghana

Sinking Sands is a 2010 Ghanaian drama film written, produced and directed by Leila Djansi, and starring Jimmy Jean-Louis, Ama Abebrese, Emmanuel Yeboah A. and Yemi Blaq. The film received nine (9) nominations and won 3 awards at the 2011 Africa Movie Academy Awards, including the awards for Best Screenplay & Best Makeup.

== Premise ==
The film tells the story of a couple, Jimah and Pabi, whose marriage turns into violence and abuse when Jimah becomes disfigured in a domestic accident.

== Cast ==
- Jimmy Jean-Louis as Jimah
- Ama Abebrese as Pabi
- Yemi Blaq as Dr Zach Mathews
- Chris Attoh as Mensah
- Doris Sakitey as Mrs. Dodou
- Grace Nortey as Grandma
- Narki Adulai as Wedding Guest
- Louis Marcus as Jimahs' friend
- Daphne Akatugba as Patience
- Faustina Aheto as Mourner
- Avissey Gbormitah as man under the tree
- Amanda Jissie as Ms Olu
- Trustina Fafa Sarbah as Stella
- Mrs. Julia Djansi as Panel Member
- Eddie Coffie as Obed
- Peter Etse as Priest
- Akosua Agyepong as Mama May
- Joe Akpali as Bank Manager
- Valarie Kessie as Harlott
- Archibald Etse as Son
- Afi Dzakpasu as Singer at Bar
- Samir Yaw White as Mourner
- Natascha Mieke as Dr. Samantha Rogers
- Michelle Hogba as herself
- Lawrence Hanson as Panel member

== Reception ==
The film was positively received by many African movie critics includimg NollywoodForever.com.
