= Melissa Leilani Larson =

American playwright

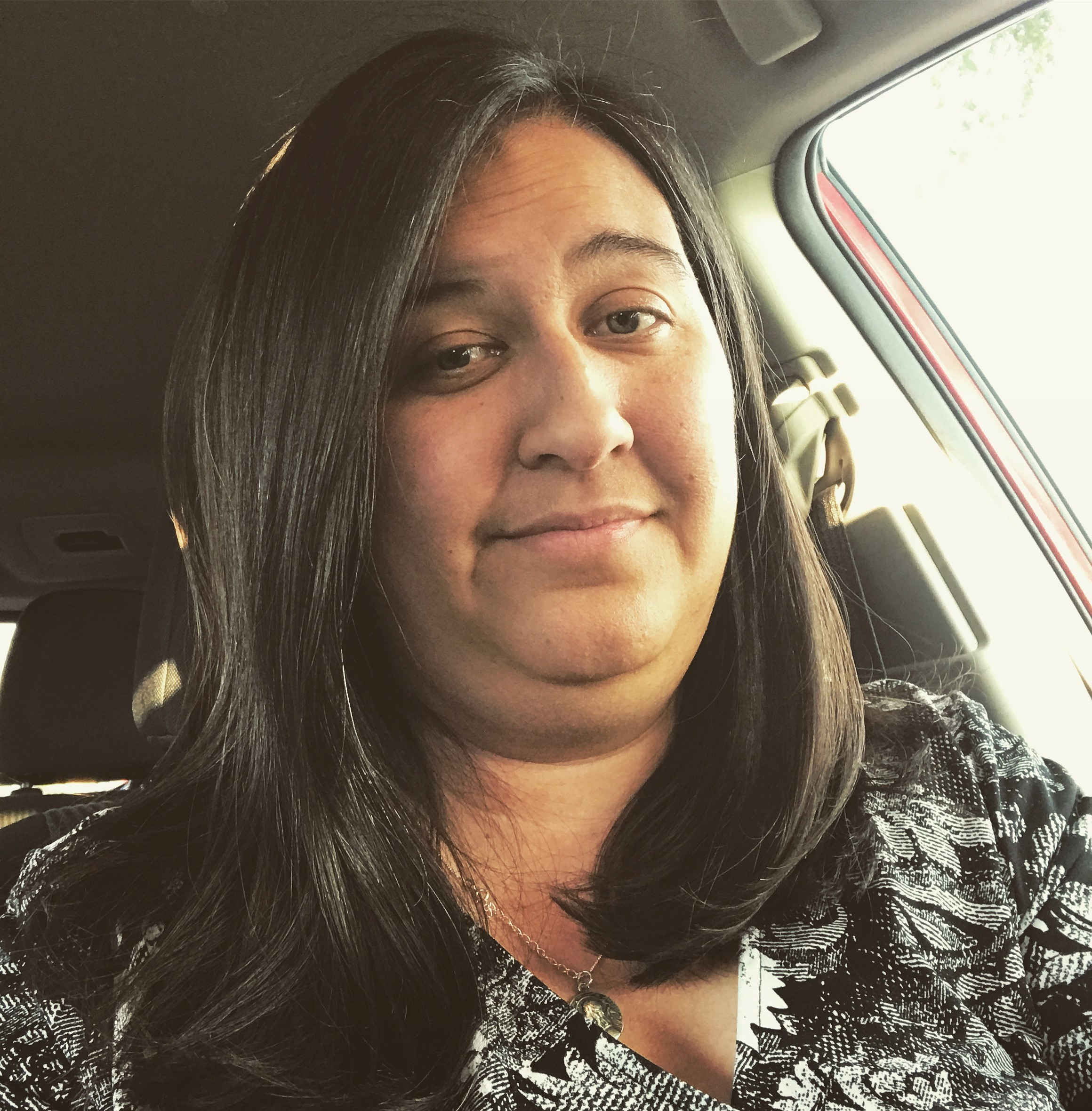
- Born: Hauʻula, Hawaii
- Education: Brigham Young University (BA); University of Iowa (MFA)
- Occupation: Playwright
- Writing career
- Literary movement: Mormon literature
- Website: www.melissaleilanilarson.com

Melissa Leilani Larson is an American writer and playwright based in Salt Lake City, Utah. Mormon literature critic Michael Austin described her as "one of the true rising stars of Mormon literature." Producer Jeremy Long described her as the "best playwright in Utah." Her plays commonly feature women in leading roles, and some center around the faith of members of the Church of Jesus Christ of Latter-day Saints (LDS Church).

== Early life and education ==
Larson is from Hauʻula, Hawaii. Her mother is Filipina and her father is of English and Swedish ancestry. She's one of two children, with one younger sister.

Her family moved to Utah when she was twelve years old.

She received a bachelor's degree in English from Brigham Young University (BYU) and an MFA from The Iowa Playwrights Workshop at the University of Iowa. She names Helen Edmundson, Sarah Ruhl, Richard Greenberg, Timberlake Wertenbaker, Lillian Hellman, and Oscar Wilde as some of her favorite playwrights. Larson has contributed to LDS Church History's Saints: The Standard of Truth.

== Plays ==
Martyrs' Crossing, originally titled Angels Unaware, shows St. Catherine and St. Margaret influencing Joan of Arc through her resistance and martyrdom and was first produced in 2006 at BYU. Genelle Pugmire at Deseret News named it as the best production of the year. Fellow Utah playwright Mahonri Stewart wrote that while Larson beautifully emphasized the humanity of Catholic saints, the chorus of historians was "redundant." He found the comparisons of Joan of Arc to Joseph Smith distracting.

Larson won the 2009 AML award for drama for Little Happy Secrets, a play about a faithful young LDS woman who develops romantic feelings for her female roommate. In the award, AML called the play "a celebration of heartbreak." In his blog, Brigham Young University English professor Gideon Burton described the play as "[making] the problem of same-sex attraction [...] normal, that is, as credible."

Larson's 2010 play A Flickering features a filmmaker and actress who are friends, and was set in the early 1900s during the silent film era. Critic Katie Roundy found the live piano music and title cards occasionally distracted from the main action, but that the play left her "wanting more." A Flickering was a Trustus Playwrights Festival finalist.

After a stage adaptation of Persuasion, BYU commissioned Larson's stage adaptation of Pride and Prejudice. It won the 2014 AML award for drama, with the award text referring to the adaptation as "one of the most entertaining works by a Mormon playwright to date." Salt Lake City Weekly gave Pride and Prejudice a "Best Modern Jane" headline, stating that Larson's adaptation felt "fresh without resorting to gimmickry." At the Utah Theater Bloggers Association, the play was spotlighted in a 2014 roundup under "Excellent New Plays." Barta Heiner directed both plays.

Larson co-wrote a musical adaptation of Silas Marner called The Weaver of Raveloe in 2013, and the play was produced in 2014. She is part of the lab for playwrights at Plan-B Theatre, which she joined around 2013. Pilot Program was her first play shown there. Pilot Program centers around an imagined future where a faithful LDS couple is asked to practice polygamy. At The Utah Review, reviewer Les Roka described it as "a compelling tableau of social messages and contemplation of religious identity that resonates with the depth of exploration suggested in the works of Henrik Ibsen, August Strindberg and Gerhart Hauptmann." The play won AML's 2015 award for drama.

Larson's 2016 play The Edible Complex was written for elementary school students and has actors taking on the roles of Larson's favorite foods. The play addresses eating disorders. Sweetheart Come was a 2016 O'Neill National Playwrights Conference semifinalist. The University of Utah's Daily Utah Chronicle critic Palak Jayswal wrote that the play "encourages empathy while breaking the stigma about isolation and unhappiness." In City Weekly, Scott Renshaw called the play "a character study of mental illness," praising the play's unique set design, which used paper to outline and subvert the confines of the stage. Writing for The Utah Review, Les Roka described Larson's script as "a fascinating, cogent interpretation of Emma Hauck’s story."

Larson adapted Rabindranath Tagore's The Post Office for a theater collaboration between the Granite School District, Plan-B Theatre, Gandhi Alliance for Peace, and the United Nations Association of Utah. She adapted the play for modern audiences and made the original twelve-man cast more gender-diverse; in Larson's adaptation, the three main characters are female or non-binary and other characters are adaptable to any gender. The production's director sought specifically to involve refugee students. Roka wrote that Larson's script "flows with elegant, accessible symbolism."

== Films ==
=== Freetown ===
Larson collaborated with Garrett Batty on the script for Freetown (2015), a movie about six Liberian LDS missionaries fleeing the country in the First Liberian Civil War. Freetown won the 2016 Utah Film Award for Best Feature Film and the 2015 Ghana Movie Award for Best Screenplay.

=== Jane and Emma ===
The film Jane and Emma (2018) focuses on the friendship between Jane Elizabeth Manning James and Emma Smith, examining racial issues in the early LDS church. It appeared on a list of films that fulfilled ReFrame's criteria for gender-balanced and racially diverse films.

Sales from the film's opening night were matched by The Church of Jesus Christ of Latter-day Saints' foundation and the Bonneville Charitable Foundation and given as a donation to the NAACP Salt Lake Branch.

Larson studied the journals of both women while writing the script, and stated that the film is "not about preaching to people. It's about these two women and their relationship." Mariah Proctor at Meridian magazine wrote that the film "issues an invitation to a conversation" about the two women and their relationship to each other and the LDS Church.

Fellow Plan-B playwright Eric Samuelsen reviewed the film in BYU Studies, writing that Larson's script "honors the history in which the story is rooted while fictionalizing when needed." Camlyn Giddins also reviewed the film in the same publication, noting that while the climax seems forced, the film encourages introspection.

Jane and Emma won the Feature Film award at the LDS Film Festival, as well as the Audience Award in the same category. The film was also a finalist in the 2018 Narrative Film category at the Association for Mormon Letters.

== Other awards ==
Martyrs' Crossing was an IRAM Best New Play. Standing Still Standing won a Mayhew award. Lady in Waiting was the winner of the Lewis National Playwriting Contest for Women. Larson won the 2003 AML award for drama for Wake Me When It's Over.

Larson received the Smith-Pettit Foundation Award for Outstanding Contribution to Mormon Letters in 2019. The award citation stated that Larson "offers herself as a witness to both the pain and faith of her fellow Saints when their obedience to God pushes them up against the limits of their endurance."

== Publications ==
Her plays Little Happy Secrets and Pilot Program were published together in a book called Third Wheel in 2017 by BCC Press. Little Happy Secrets has been adapted into audio format.
