= Alphonse Menyo =

Ghanaian actor

- Born: Alphonse Menyo; Ghana
- Education: National Film and Television Institute (NAFTI)
- Occupations: Actor, director
- Years active: 2009–present
- Parents: Bernard Menyo (father); Eugenia Menyo (mother)
- Awards: Ghana Movie Awards

Alphonse Menyo, is a Ghanaian actor. He is best known for his roles in the films Freetown and Gold Coast Lounge.

== Personal life ==
He was born in Accra, Ghana. His father, Bernard Menyo, was from East Africa. He is a former student of National Film and Television Institute (NAFTI). Bernard won an award in the Panafrican Film and Television Festival of Ouagadougou (FESPACO) for the film Whose fault. Menyo's mother, Eugenia, was from Ghana who worked for an NGO.

== Career ==
Menyo attended Ghallywood Academy of Film Acting in Accra, Ghana to study cinema and drama. He started his drama career in 2009 with a stage drama. In 2015, he made his maiden cinema role in the American independent film Freetown directed by Garrett Batty. The film was screened in several international film festivals, and was nominated for several Ghana Movie Awards.

Menyo made his directorial debut with the film Utopia. The film received four nominations at Ghana Movie Awards. In 2017, Utopia became the only Ghanaian movie to bw selected and screened at the Helsinki African Film Festival (HAFF). In 2017, he acted in the romantic thriller short Black Rose directed by Pascal Aka. In 2018, he joined with Pascal Aka's next venture, and starred in the short film Corruption. Menyo won the Yaa Asantewaa award at the Black Star International Film Festival for his role and also won the Best Male Actor at the Fickin International Film Festival in Kinshasa, Congo.

He was selected to represent Ghana at the 2019 World Youth Theater in Egypt. Later in the year, he played the role 'Daniel' in the film Gold Coast Lounge. For his role, he won the award for the Best Lead Actor at the 2019 Ghana Movie Awards.

== Filmography ==
Year	Film	Role	Genre	Ref.
2015	Freetown	Meyers	Film	
2017	Black Rose	Daniel	Short film	
2020	Gold Coast Lounge	Daniel	Film	
2020	Ato Kwabena		Film	
