= Funny Face (comedian) =

Ghanaian comedian

- Born: Benson Nana Yaw Oduro Boateng; 1 October 1981 (age 45)
- Other name: kasoa vandamme
- Children: 3

Comedy career
- Years active: 2010–present

Benson Nana Yaw Oduro Boateng (born October 1, 1981 in a town called Jamestown/Usshertown, Accra, Ghana,) popularly known as Funny Face, is a Ghanaian comedian, known for his role in TV3 Ghana's sitcom Chorkor Trotro. He is also known as SwagOn-Papa.

== Career ==
Funny Face's first appearance on the Night of 1010 Laughs was in 2010 Ghana. It is believed that he made his breakthrough in comedy through this.

Funny Face played the role of driver's mate in the TV3 sitcom Chorkor Trotro, where he was known as Chemu before quitting. His role in Chorkor Trotro gave him much popularity. He has also performed at the comedy dubbed Night of 1018 laughs.

His interest in music made him work with hiplife artist Castro de Destroyer. He featured in Castro's Sweet Banana while Castro also featured in Funny Face's Odo Bekumi. Funny Face also appeared in Castro and Asamoah Gyan's Do The Dance, and Odo Pa.

He has also assisted Togolese international footballer Emmanuel Adebayor at his charity event. He also spearheaded the Vodafone Ghana Red Campaign.

== Marriage life ==
Funny Face married his wife Madama Elizabeth Adjoa Ntim in 2014 at a private ceremony witnessed by very few family and friends. Two years later, Funny Face confirmed on social media that they were separated. Following the controversial breakup, Ntim spoke about an unfulfilling sexual relationship while Funny Face accused her of cheating on him. Funny Face has 3 children with his partner Vanessa, who he met in 2019 through Papa Kumasi.

== Personal life ==
Funny Face has twins who he has named after his mother and footballer friend Emmanuel Adebayor. The names of the twins are Ella and Bella. He attended school at God Wisdom Preparatory School, O'Reilly Senior High School.

== Funny Face Struggled with Mental Health ==
In 2022, he suffered from depression and was admitted at the psychiatric hospital. He spoke publicly about losing friendship, properties, and opportunities during his struggles with depression and emotional instability. Funny Face now considers himself as a mental health ambassador following his mental health struggles between 2022 and 2024.

Speaking on Primetime on May 20, he said his personal experiences had taught him valuable lessons, which he continues to build on as he positions himself as an advocate for mental health awareness. "Now I'm a mental health ambassador. I've learnt, released, and that's a field I want to fully enter into. I've read and studied about it," he said.

== Filmography ==
TV Series

- Chorkor Trotro
- Cow And Chicken

=== Music ===
- Lan T
- Wormbat
- Odo Bekumi ft Castro
- Tramadol ft Article Wan
