= Freetown (film) =

- Directed by: Garrett Batty
- Written by: Garrett Batty and Melissa Leilani Larson
- Produced by: Adam Abel and Garrett Batty
- Starring: Henry Adofo; Michael Attram; Phillip Michael; Bright Dodoo; Clement Amegayie; Alphonse Menyo; Great Eiiro
- Distributed by: Excel Entertainment
- Release date: April 8, 2015 (US)
- Running time: 113 minutes
- Country: United States
- Language: English

Freetown is a 2015 biopic film based on a true story about missionaries of The Church of Jesus Christ of Latter-day Saints in Liberia seeking to escape the 1990 Liberian Civil War to safety in bordering Sierra Leone.

== Plot ==
Philip Abubakar, a local branch leader for the LDS church, and six African missionaries for the faith (Elders Menti, Meyers, Gaye, Nyanforth, Selli and Forkpah) are stuck in Monrovia during the First Liberian Civil War. Prevented from conducting missionary work due to the war, they create a plan to escape to the northern border with Sierra Leone, so they can continue preaching without the fear of being killed.

Elder Gaye is a member of the Krahn tribe, which is being targeted for execution by rebels from the International Patriotic Front of Liberia (INPFL). The local rebellion leader, Ansa, kills both male and female Krahn tribe members on sight, blaming them for the war started by President Samuel Doe, a Krahn, as well as for the killing of his father, mother, and two younger brothers. Luckily for the missionaries, one of the other rebels, Momulu, a member of the local LDS branch, is able to convince Ansa to spare Elder Gaye's life. The missionaries are taken away, then released to join Abubakar and the four other missionaries on a trip to the border. The seven escapees crowd into an old, red five-seat sedan driven by Abubakar, with the Biblical passage "Mark 9:24" written on the back ("And straightway the father of the child cried out, and said with tears, Lord, I believe; help thou mine unbelief"). Ansa, furious over the missing missionaries, tracks them to the border to ensure Elder Gaye does not leave the country to Freetown, Sierra Leone.

At each checkpoint, they gradually trade their belongings to pass through. Their car runs out of gas, just as they make it to a small town with a petrol pump, but they have no money left. They trade their remaining possessions for liters of petrol to help them reach the border. Once they reach the border, they find out the bridge is closed. Abubakar is also disappointed when he finds that the missionaries have no ID papers or passports, since none of them has ever left the country. The escapees seem to have no hope to cross into Sierra Leone.

After praying, Abubakar hears the sound of a ferry carrier. Just as they are about to board to go to Sierra Leone, they are caught by Ansa and Momulu. Momulu tells them to do whatever Ansa asks, then leaves. Just as Ansa is about to execute Elder Gaye for being a Krahn, Momulu returns with armed soldiers, who demand that Ansa release the missionaries. The leader of the soldiers declares that he himself is a Krahn, and when asked whose side he is on, Momulu abandons Ansa and sides with the missionaries. Abubakar and the missionaries then safely cross the border and are reunited in Freetown with President Cunningham, the LDS mission president who is their supervisor for religious duties. A title card reveals the missionaries continued living in Sierra Leone for the next seven years, until the civil war ended.

== Principal Photography ==
The filming was done entirely in West Africa.

== Reception ==
=== Critical response ===
On review aggregator Rotten Tomatoes, the film holds an approval rating of 50% based on 12 reviews, with an average rating of 6.14/10.

== Nomination ==
The film was nominated for several Ghana Movie Awards: Actor in a Leading Role (Henry Adofo), Screenplay (Melissa Leilani Larson and Garrett Batty), Original Score (Kirk Sharpe), Visual Effects (Davin Bekins), Production Design (Albert Aidoo and Courage Wormenor), Cinematography (Jeremy Prusso), Sound Editing and Mixing (George Dankwa), Directing (Garrett Batty), and Best Picture. It won the screenplay award over the also-nominated films If Tomorrow Never Comes, Beasts of No Nation, The Cursed Ones, and Silver Rain.

The film is shortlisted for an AML Award.

== See also ==
- List of black films of the 2010s
