= List of submissions to the 92nd Academy Awards for Best International Feature Film =

2019 Best International Feature submissions
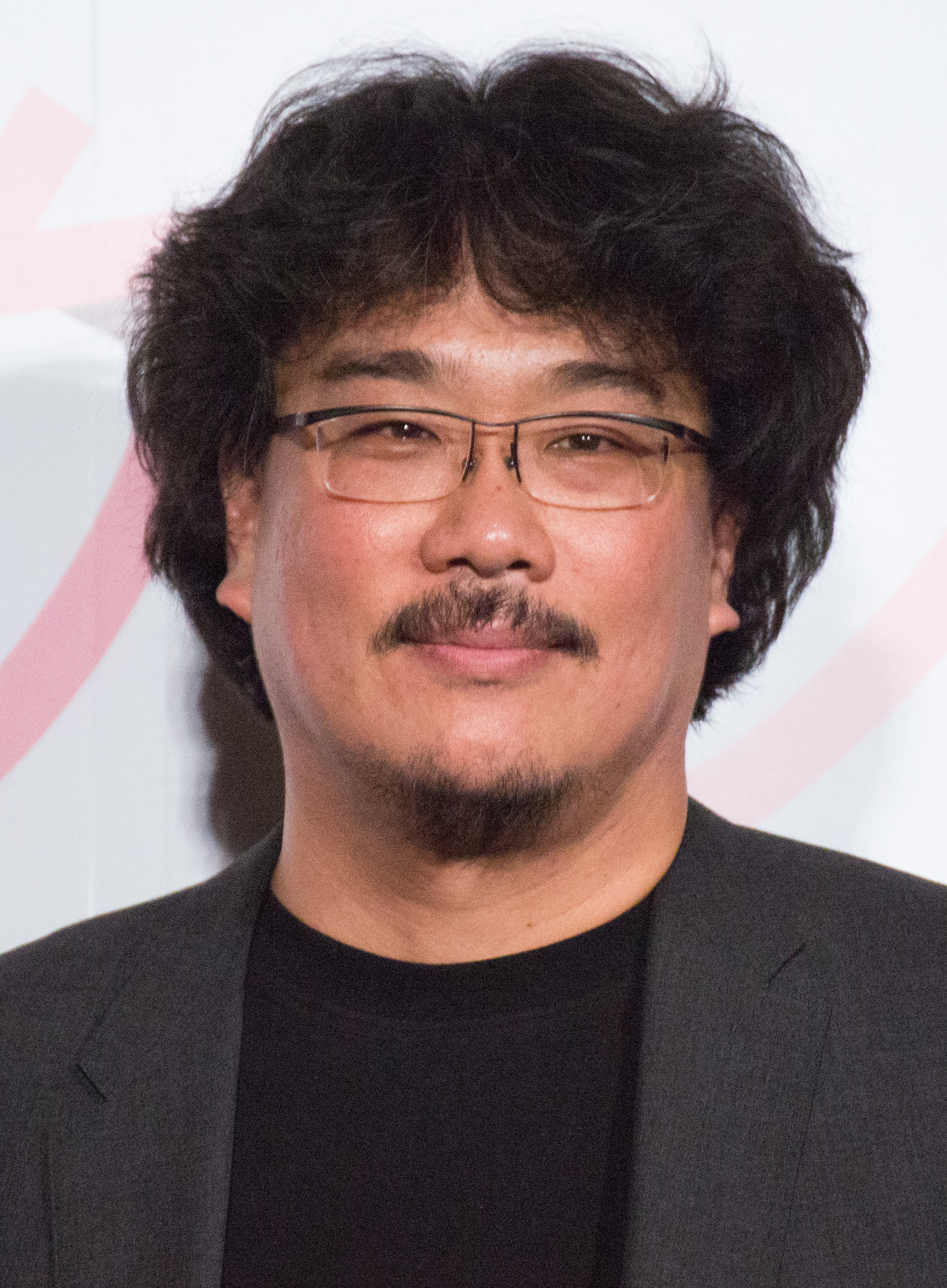
- Bong Joon-ho directed Parasite, which won the year's award.

Highlights
- Oscar winner: (South Korea) Parasite
- Submissions: 94
- Debuts: 3
- Total eligible: 93

This is a list of submissions to the 92nd Academy Awards for the Best International Feature Film. The Academy of Motion Picture Arts and Sciences (AMPAS) has invited the film industries of various countries to submit their best film for the Academy Award for Best International Feature Film every year since the award was created in 1956. The award is presented annually by the Academy to a feature-length motion picture produced outside the United States that contains primarily non-English dialogue. The International Feature Film Award Committee oversees the process and reviews all the submitted films. The category was previously called the Best Foreign Language Film, but this was changed in April 2019 to Best International Feature Film, after the Academy deemed the word "Foreign" to be outdated.

For the 92nd Academy Awards, the submitted motion pictures must have first been released theatrically in their respective countries between 1 October 2018 and 30 September 2019. The deadline for submissions to the Academy was 1 October 2019. 94 countries submitted films, and 93 were found to be eligible by AMPAS and screened for voters. Ghana, Nigeria, and Uzbekistan submitted films for the first time; however, Nigeria's film did not appear on the final list. After the 10-film shortlist was announced on 16 December 2019, the five nominees were announced on 13 January 2020.

South Korea won the award for the first time with Parasite by Bong Joon-ho, which also won Best Picture (becoming the first and only non-English language film to do so), Best Director and Best Original Screenplay, and was also nominated for Best Film Editing and Best Production Design.

== Submissions ==
Submitting country	Film title used in nomination	Original title	Language(s)	Director(s)	Result
Afghanistan	Hava, Maryam, Ayesha	حوا، مریم، عایشه	Persian, Dari	Sahraa Karimi	Disqualified
Albania	The Delegation	Delegacioni	Albanian, French	Bujar Alimani	Not nominated
Algeria	Papicha	بابيشة	Arabic, French	Mounia Meddour	Not nominated
Argentina	Heroic Losers	La odisea de los giles	Spanish	Sebastián Borensztein	Not nominated
Armenia	Lengthy Night	Էրկեն Կիշեր	Armenian	Edgar Baghdasaryan	Not nominated
Australia	Buoyancy		Khmer, Thai, Isan, Burmese	Rodd Rathjen	Not nominated
Austria	Joy		English, German, Nigerian Pidgin, Edo	Sudabeh Mortezai	Disqualified
Bangladesh	Alpha	আলফা	Bengali	Nasiruddin Yousuff	Not nominated
Belarus	Debut	Дебют	Russian	Anastasiya Miroshnichenko	Not nominated
Belgium	Our Mothers	Nuestras madres	Spanish	César Díaz	Not nominated
Bolivia	I Miss You	Tu me manques	Spanish, English	Rodrigo Bellott	Not nominated
Bosnia and Herzegovina	The Son	Sin	Bosnian	Ines Tanović	Not nominated
Brazil	Invisible Life	A Vida Invisível de Eurídice Gusmão	Brazilian Portuguese, Greek	Karim Aïnouz	Not nominated
Bulgaria	Ága	Ага	Yakut	Milko Lazarov	Not nominated
Cambodia	In the Life of Music	តន្រ្តីជីវិត	Khmer, English	Caylee So and Sok Visal	Not nominated
Canada	Antigone		French, English, Arabic	Sophie Deraspe	Not nominated
Chile	Spider	Araña	Spanish, German, Haitian Creole	Andrés Wood	Not nominated
China	Ne Zha	哪吒之魔童降世	Mandarin, Sichuanese Standard Mandarin	Jiaozi	Not nominated
Colombia	Monos		Spanish, English	Alejandro Landes	Not nominated
Costa Rica	The Awakening of the Ants	El despertar de las hormigas	Spanish	Antonella Sudasassi	Not nominated
Croatia	Mali		Croatian	Antonio Nuić	Not nominated
Cuba	A Translator	Un traductor	Spanish, Russian	Rodrigo and Sebastián Barriuso	Not nominated
Czech Republic	The Painted Bird	Nabarvené ptáče / Пофарбоване пташеня / Kolorovana ptica	Interslavic, Czech, Russian, German	Václav Marhoul	Made shortlist
Denmark	Queen of Hearts	Dronningen	Danish, Swedish	May el-Toukhy	Not nominated
Dominican Republic	The Projectionist	El proyeccionista	Spanish	José María Cabral	Not nominated
Ecuador	The Longest Night	La mala noche	Spanish	Gabriela Calvache	Not nominated
Egypt	Poisonous Roses	ورد مسموم	Arabic	Fawzi Saleh	Not nominated
Estonia	Truth and Justice	Tõde ja õigus	Estonian	Tanel Toom	Made shortlist
Ethiopia	Running Against the Wind	የንፋሱ ፍልሚያ	Amharic	Jan Philipp Weyl	Not nominated
Finland	Stupid Young Heart	Hölmö nuori sydän	Finnish, Somali	Selma Vilhunen	Not nominated
France	Les Misérables		French, Bambara	Ladj Ly	Nominated
Georgia	Shindisi	შინდისი	Georgian, Russian	Dito Tsintsadze	Not nominated
Germany	System Crasher	Systemsprenger	German	Nora Fingscheidt	Not nominated
Ghana	Azali		Dagbani, Twi, Ghanaian Pidgin English	Kwabena Gyansah	Not nominated
Greece	When Tomatoes Met Wagner	Όταν ο Βάγκνερ Συνάντησε τις Ντομάτες	Greek, English, French	Marianna Economou	Not nominated
Honduras	Blood, Passion and Coffee	Café con sabor a mi tierra	Spanish	Carlos Membreño	Not nominated
Hong Kong	The White Storm 2: Drug Lords	掃毒2天地對決	Cantonese	Herman Yau	Not nominated
Hungary	Those Who Remained	Akik maradtak	Hungarian	Barnabás Tóth	Made shortlist
Iceland	A White, White Day	Hvítur, hvítur dagur	Icelandic	Hlynur Pálmason	Not nominated
India	Gully Boy	गली बॉय	Hindi, Punjabi, Bambaiya Hindi, English, Hinglish	Zoya Akhtar	Not nominated
Indonesia	Memories of My Body	Kucumbu Tubuh Indahku	Javanese, Indonesian	Garin Nugroho	Not nominated
Iran	Finding Farideh	در جستجوی فریده	Persian, Dutch, English	Kourosh Ataee and Azadeh Moussavi	Not nominated
Ireland	Gaza	غزة	Arabic	Garry Keane and Andrew McConnell	Not nominated
Israel	Incitement	ימים נוראים	Hebrew	Yaron Zilberman	Not nominated
Italy	The Traitor	Il traditore	Italian, Sicilian, Brazilian Portuguese, English	Marco Bellocchio	Not nominated
Japan	Weathering with You	天気の子	Japanese	Makoto Shinkai	Not nominated
Kazakhstan	Kazakh Khanate – Golden Throne	Қазақ хандығы – Алтын тақ	Kazakh	Rustem Abdrashev	Not nominated
Kenya	Subira		Swahili, English	Ravneet Chadha	Not nominated
Kosovo	Zana		Albanian	Antoneta Kastrati	Not nominated
Kyrgyzstan	Aurora	Аврора	Kyrgyz, Russian	Bekzat Pirmatov	Not nominated
Latvia	The Mover	Tēvs Nakts	Latvian, Russian, German, Yiddish	Dāvis Sīmanis Jr.	Not nominated
Lebanon	1982		Arabic, English, French	Oualid Mouaness	Not nominated
Lithuania	Bridges of Time	Laika tilti / Laiko tiltai	Latvian, Lithuanian, Estonian, Hebrew, Russian	Kristine Briede and Audrius Stonys	Not nominated
Luxembourg	Tel Aviv on Fire	תל אביב על האש	Hebrew, Arabic	Sameh Zoabi	Not nominated
Malaysia	M for Malaysia		Malay, English	Dian Lee and Ineza Roussille	Not nominated
Mexico	The Chambermaid	La camarista	Spanish, French	Lila Avilés	Not nominated
Mongolia	The Steed	Хийморь	Mongolian, Russian, Kazakh, Mandarin	Erdenebileg Ganbold	Not nominated
Montenegro	Neverending Past	Između dana i noći	Montenegrin	Andro Martinović	Not nominated
Morocco	Adam	آدم	Arabic	Maryam Touzani	Not nominated
Nepal	Bulbul	बुलबुल	Nepali	Binod Paudel	Not nominated
Netherlands	Instinct		Dutch	Halina Reijn	Not nominated
Nigeria	Lionheart		English, Igbo, Hausa	Genevieve Nnaji	Disqualified
North Macedonia	Honeyland	Медена земја	Balkan Gagauz, Macedonian, Serbian, Croatian, Bosnian	Tamara Kotevska and Ljubomir Stefanov	Nominated
Norway	Out Stealing Horses	Ut og stjæle hester	Norwegian, Swedish	Hans Petter Moland	Not nominated
Pakistan	The Red Pigeon	لال کبوتر	Urdu	Kamal Khan	Not nominated
Palestine	It Must Be Heaven	إن شئت كما في السماء	Arabic, French, English, Spanish, Hebrew, Japanese	Elia Suleiman	Not nominated
Panama	Everybody Changes	Todos cambiamos	Spanish	Arturo Montenegro	Not nominated
Peru	Retablo		Ayacucho Quechua, Spanish	Álvaro Delgado-Aparicio	Not nominated
Philippines	Verdict		Filipino, English	Raymund Ribay Gutierrez	Not nominated
Poland	Corpus Christi	Boże Ciało	Polish	Jan Komasa	Nominated
Portugal	The Domain	A Herdade	Portuguese	Tiago Guedes	Not nominated
Romania	The Whistlers	La Gomera	Romanian, English, Silbo Gomero, Spanish	Corneliu Porumboiu	Not nominated
Russia	Beanpole	Дылда	Russian	Kantemir Balagov	Made shortlist
Saudi Arabia	The Perfect Candidate	المرشح المثالي	Arabic	Haifaa al-Mansour	Not nominated
Senegal	Atlantics	Atlantique	Wolof, French, English, Arabic	Mati Diop	Made shortlist
Serbia	King Petar of Serbia	Краљ Петар Први	Serbian	Petar Ristovski	Not nominated
Singapore	A Land Imagined	幻土	Mandarin, English, Bengali	Yeo Siew Hua	Not nominated
Slovakia	Let There Be Light	Nech je svetlo	Slovak, German	Marko Škop	Not nominated
Slovenia	History of Love	Zgodovina ljubezni	Slovene, English	Sonja Prosenc	Not nominated
South Africa	Knuckle City		Xhosa	Jahmil X. T. Qubeka	Not nominated
South Korea	Parasite	기생충	Korean, English	Bong Joon-ho	Won Academy Award
Spain	Pain and Glory	Dolor y gloria	Spanish	Pedro Almodóvar	Nominated
Sweden	And Then We Danced	და ჩვენ ვიცეკვეთ	Georgian	Levan Akin	Not nominated
Switzerland	The Awakening of Motti Wolkenbruch	Wolkenbruchs wunderliche Reise in die Arme einer Schickse	German, Yiddish, Hebrew, Swiss German	Michael Steiner	Not nominated
Taiwan	Dear Ex	誰先愛上他的	Mandarin	Mag Hsu and Hsu Chih-yen	Not nominated
Thailand	Krasue: Inhuman Kiss	แสงกระสือ	Thai	Sitisiri Mongkolsiri	Not nominated
Tunisia	Dear Son	ولدي / Mon cher enfant	Arabic	Mohamed Ben Attia	Not nominated
Turkey	Commitment	Bağlılık Aslı	Turkish	Semih Kaplanoğlu	Not nominated
Ukraine	Homeward	Evge / Додому	Crimean Tatar, Ukrainian, Russian, Arabic	Nariman Aliev	Not nominated
United Kingdom	The Boy Who Harnessed the Wind		Chewa, English	Chiwetel Ejiofor	Not nominated
Uruguay	The Moneychanger	Así habló el cambista	Spanish, Uruguayan Portuguese	Federico Veiroj	Not nominated
Uzbekistan	Hot Bread	Issiq non	Uzbek	Umid Khamdamov	Not nominated
Venezuela	Being Impossible	Yo, imposible	Spanish	Patricia Ortega	Not nominated
Vietnam	Furie	Hai Phượng	Vietnamese	Lê Văn Kiệt	Not nominated

== Notes ==
- Afghanistan submitted Hava, Maryam, Ayesha by Sahraa Karimi, but it was not on the final list because questions were raised over the legitimacy of the national committee that submitted it.
- Austria submitted Joy by Sudabeh Mortezai, but it was disqualified in November 2019, with the Academy stating that the film had too much of its dialogue in English. The filmmakers disputed the disqualification, arguing that dialogue in Nigerian Pidgin was unintelligible to English speakers without subtitles, and should be counted separately from standard English. Because standard English constituted less than 50% of the film's dialogue, the film should be eligible. The Academy stood by its initial decision. However, they changed the rules to allow films in Pidgin English the following year.
- Nigeria submitted Lionheart by Genevieve Nnaji, its first-ever Oscar submission. It was disqualified in November 2019 as only 11 minutes of its 95-minute runtime featured non-English language dialogue, in violation of the Academy's rule that an entry's "original dialogue track as well as the completed picture must be predominantly in a language or languages other than English." Director Ava DuVernay criticized the Academy's rule and the film's disqualification saying, "English is the official language of Nigeria. Are you barring the country from ever competing for an Oscar in its official language?" The Academy's International Feature Film executive committee chairman Larry Karaszewski said the rules were clearly communicated to the submitting international committees. He commented, "If you're submitting for something as important as an Academy Award, I would think you should look at the rules." The Nigerian selection committee responded, "Going forward, the committee intends to submit films which are predominantly foreign language — non-English recording dialogue."
- Initial reports stated that Uganda had selected Kony: Order from Above by Steve T. Ayeny as their first-ever Oscar submission. However, the Uganda Oscars Selection Committee said that the film did not meet the minimum qualification requirements for selection and was not submitted.
