= Azali (film) =

2018 film

- Film poster
- Directed by: Kwabena Gyansah
- Written by: Kwabena Gyansah (story); Gwandelen Quartey (screenplay)
- Produced by: Sarah Dwommoh
- Starring: Ama K. Abebrese
- Cinematography: William Kojo Agbeti
- Edited by: William Kojo Agbeti
- Music by: Gomez Tito
- Production companies: Ananse Entertainment; Motion Revolution
- Distributed by: Ananse Entertainment
- Release date: 26 October 2018
- Running time: 92 minutes
- Country: Ghana
- Languages: Dagbani; Akan

Azali is a 2018 Ghanaian drama film directed by Kwabena Gyansah. It was selected as the Ghanaian entry for the Best International Feature Film at the 92nd Academy Awards, but it was not nominated. It was the first time that Ghana had submitted a film for the Best International Feature Film Oscar.

== Plot ==
A 14 year-old girl, Amina, lives with her mother, grandmother, and uncle in a small village in northern Ghana. She lives a comfortable but boring life from which her mother wishes to free her. Her grandmother wishes for Amina to marry an older man from their village. Amina's mother protests and unknowingly sells Amina to strangers in the hopes of her finding a better life in the city. On her journey Amina meets young man who was also sold as a boy and, in some way, becomes her only friend. The two run away with a small band of kids who were also sold off. As the two embark on various errands through Accra they try to earn their keep.

The young man, Seidu, becomes popular as he is a quick and hard worker. Amina is clumsy and cannot keep up with the work given to her. She quickly finds herself living in a compound of a woman who demands rent daily. Here Amina learns that in order to stay she must always have money, however her job as a head-porter is not lucrative enough. She decides to join her neighbor, the landlord's favorite, as a prostitute in order to stay. For a while this goes well, but she grows sadder as the work goes on. Eventually she tries to reunite with Seidu. He turns her away because he cannot afford to be an outsider in his newly found living/working arrangements as a porter. Amina returns to the taxing compound and grows complacent as time passes. During this time Amina's Uncle, Akatok, goes to search for Amina in Accra after her mother finds out the news her daughter is “missing”.

For months Akatok searches but to no avail. He decides he will give up after just three months of searching, but is put back on track by an old friend with great advice. Amina, now more accustomed to her job, sleeps with a man who refuses to pay her the promised wage. She, in turn, breaks a glass over his head and steals the money from his wallet. Amina runs to find Seidu to tell him she wishes to go back home. Instead she find Seidu's boss, Razak, who calls her in to wait on Seidu together. Razak attacks Amina while they are alone and rapes her. Seidu comes back to the terrible scene and apologizes for interrupting his boss and is distraught at his friend's rape.

Seidu, later on, beats Razak for what he's done leaving him bleeding in the street. Amina returns to the demanding landlord and her neighbor who tries to care for her after the attack. Soon after Amina and the landlord learn of Amina's pregnancy for which the landlord berates her. Amina cannot have a baby in the compound, so she goes to live on the streets of Accra while just a few weeks pregnant. Eight months pass and Amina has become a head-porter again, this time more graceful and heavier; she is in her last trimester of pregnancy. Akatok and his friend continue their search nearby. While working, Amina encounters a mob of people led by Razak that are beating Seidu, and she is helpless as they immolate him. At this moment, Akatok and his friend find Amina and reunite with her at least. Akatok, however, recognizes Razak, and tells Amina that he is her estranged father. Amina immediately faints on hearing that she had been unwittingly impregnated by her own father.

Amina finally returns to her compound, where she gives birth in her family's compound under the star-filled sky. In the final scenes we hear the baby crying and the grandmother chanting over the baby. We hear a man, presumably Akatok, speak in his native tongue. The words on screen as he speaks read: This child will never be accepted by tradition so in our hearts we buried a secret only heaven knows.

== Cast ==
- Ama K. Abebrese as Joan
- Asana Alhassan as Amina
- Adjetey Anang as Akatok
- Akofa Edjeani Asiedu as Rukaya
- Emmanuel Nii Adom Quaye as Quartey
- Peter Ritchie as Razak
- Mohammed Hafiz as Seidu
- Ramatu Mohammed as Fatima
- Abdul Malek as Boy
- Alhassan Tahiru as Yussif
- Ismaila Mashod as Baba Abdulai
- Yakubu Inusah as Fuseini
- Ibrahim Alhassan as Baba Dauda
- Tony Frances as Esther
- Joka Jonas as Police Officer

== Awards ==
The film was nominated in 15 categories at the 2018 Ghana Movie Awards. It received 19 nominations at the 2019 Golden Movie Awards.

Award	Date of ceremony	Category	Recipient	Result	Ref
2018 Ghana Movie Awards	30 December 2018	Best Picture	Sandra Dwommoh	Nominated	
2018 Ghana Movie Awards	30 December 2018	Directing	Kwabena Gyansah	Nominated	
2018 Ghana Movie Awards	30 December 2018	Lead Actress	Asana Alhassan	Nominated	
2018 Ghana Movie Awards	30 December 2018	Lead Actor	Adjetey Annan	Nominated	
2018 Ghana Movie Awards	30 December 2018	Supporting Actress	Ama K. Abebrese	Nominated	
2018 Ghana Movie Awards	30 December 2018	Adapted or Original Screenplay	Gwendellen Quatey	Nominated	
2019 Golden Movie Awards	24 August 2019	Golden Soundtrack	Gomez Tito	Won	
2019 Golden Movie Awards	24 August 2019	Golden Promising Actor	Asana Alhassan	Won	
2019 Golden Movie Awards	24 August 2019	Golden Indigenous Movie	Kwabena Gyansah	Won	
2019 Golden Movie Awards	24 August 2019	Golden Cinematography	William K. Abgeti	Won	
2019 Golden Movie Awards	24 August 2019	Golden Movie Drama	Kwabena Gyansah	Won	
2019 Golden Movie Awards	24 August 2019	Golden Overall	Kwabena Gyansah	Won	

== See also ==
- List of submissions to the 92nd Academy Awards for Best International Feature Film
- List of Ghanaian submissions for the Academy Award for Best International Feature Film
