= Cow and Chicken (Ghanaian TV series) =

Ghanaian television series

Cow and Chicken is a Ghanaian drama and comic TV series produced and directed by Benson Ohene Oduro Boateng also known as funny face with Bismark Odoi also known as Bismark the Joke.

The series premiered in 2015.

== Cast ==
- Benson Ohene Oduro Boateng
- Bismark Odoi (Bismark The Joke)
