= Zynnell Zuh =

Ghanaian actress

Lydia Zynnell Zuh
- Born: 18 July 1986 (age 40); Accra, Ghana
- Citizenship: Ghanaian
- Education: Geography and Information Studies, University of Ghana
- Alma mater: University of Ghana
- Occupations: Actress, Writer, Producer, TV Personality
- Years active: 2004–present
- Notable work: Hire a Man

Lydia Zynnell Zuh (born July 18, 1986) is a Ghanaian fashion icon, actress, writer, producer, television personality, and philanthropist who hails from the Volta region of Ghana. She joined the Ghana movie industry in 2004 and has since received several awards for her work, including the Glitz Style Awards, City People Entertainment Awards and Golden Movie Awards.

== Early life and education ==
Zynnell Zuh was born in Accra, Ghana. She received her secondary school education at Wesley Girls Senior High School and acquired a bachelor's degree in Geography and Information Studies from the University of Ghana.

== Career ==
Zynnell Zuh's acting career began in 2004 when she starred in the television series Sticking to the Promise by Point Blank Media. The actress, who was discovered by Shirley Frimpong-Manso, shot into fame in 2010 after starring in television series and movies, including Tears of a Smile. She later ventured into movie productions where she produced When Love Comes Around, which won an award at the 2015 Africa Magic Viewer's Choice awards.

She produced When Loves Comes Around, Love Regardless and Anniversary.

== Philanthropy ==
As of 2016, she was the ambassador for the United Against Child Poverty Campaign, an initiative by the African Rights Initiative International aimed at eradicating child poverty in Africa. She is also a patron of the Inspire Africa NGO.

== Filmography ==
She has starred in several movies including:

- Adams Apples
- Seduction
- Single Six
- When Love Comes Around (2014)
- Love Regardless (2015)
- Anniversary (2015) as Samira Boateng
- Just Married
- Hire a Man (2017) as Teshi Lawson
- Shampaign
- Deranged (2017) as Kamila Essiam
- Crazy Lovely Cool - Musical Drama Series (2018) Nana
- The Table
- Life and Living It
- Different Shades of Blue
- For Better For War
- Wannebe
- Deadline

== Awards and nominations ==
She has won several awards including:

Year	Event	Prize	Result
2013	City People entertainment awards	Best supporting actress	Won
2016	Golden Movie awards	Best Actress in a Drama 2016 ‘ANNIVERSARY’	Won
2016	Glitz Style Awards	Most Stylish Movie Star	Won
2016	Zafaa Awards	Best Actress Drama	Nominated
2017	Golden Movie Awards	Best Actress Drama	Nominated
2017	Glitz Style Awards	Most Stylish Movie Star	Won
2017	Eurostar Limousine's Ghana Fashion Review Panel prize	Best Dressed Celebrity on the Red Carpet	Won
2018	International Achievement Recognition Awards (IARA)		Nominated
2018	Spice Lifestyle Honors	Best Female Lead in a Movie	Won
2018	Ghana Makeup Awards	Most Glamorous Celebrity	Won
2019	Green October Awards		Won
2019	Glitz Style Awards	Best Dressed Celebrity on the Red Carpet	Won
