= 2019 Golden Movie Awards =

The 2019 Golden Movie Awards is an African film award ceremony that was hosted at the Movenpick Ambassador Hotel in Accra, Ghana.

== Winners ==
The results of the 2019 awards were as follows:

Golden Makeup Artiste	Golden Costume
Mulindwa Richards – 94 Terror	Nalubega Rashida – 94 Terror
Golden Short Film	Golden Editor
	Okechukwu Oku – Levi
Golden Art Director	Golden Soundtrack
Mulindwa Richard & Nkalubo Rhonnie Abrahim – 94 Terror	Gomez Tito – Azali
Golden Cinematography	Golden Editor Video
William K. Abgeti – Azali	Okechukwu Oku – Levi
Golden Screenplay – Drama	Golden Screenplay – Comedy
Mulindwa Richard – 94 Terror	Daniel Adjokatcher – Bigman Wahala
Golden Indigenous Movie	Golden Movie Discovery
Kwabena Gyansah – Azali	Ninsiima Ronah – 94 Terror
Golden Movie – Comedy	Golden Movie – Drama
Judith Audu – Bedroom Points	Kwabena Gyansah – Azali
Golden Actor – Drama	Golden Actress – Drama
Ramsey Nouah – Levi	Christabel Ekeh – Adoma
Golden Actor – Comedy	Golden Actress – Comedy
Oscar Provencial – Bigman Wahala	Omowunmi Dada – Bedroom points
Golden Supporting Actor – Drama	Golden Supporting Actress – Drama
Jeffery Nortey – Adoma	Jasmine Baroudi – Adoma
Golden Supporting Actor – Comedy	Golden Supporting Actress – Comedy
John Tijani – Bigman Wahala	Moyo Lawal – Bedroom Points
Golden Promising Actor	Golden Overall
Asana Alhassan – Azali	Kwabena Gyansah – Azali
