= Daniel Lloyd (Nigerian actor) =

Nigerian actor and talent manager

- Born: Daniel Ineye Lloyd; Bayelsa State, Nigeria
- Education: Enugu State University of Science and Technology
- Occupations: actor; talent manager
- Years active: 2006–present

Daniel Lloyd is a Nigerian actor and talent manager. In 2016, Lloyd was nominated for Most Promising Actor of the Year (English) at the City People Entertainment Awards.

== Early life and education ==
Lloyd is from the Ijaw tribe in Bayelsa State. Lloyd was born in Lagos State. Lloyd graduated from the Enugu State University of Science and Technology with a B.Sc. degree in civil engineering.

== Career ==
Lloyd started his career by featuring in a television series soap opera titled Pradah. He played the role of a character called Patrick.

Lloyd is one of the first Nigerian actors to feature in the Bollywood section in a movie titled J.U.D.E where he played the role of a character named Jude.

Lloyd in addition to being an actor, used to be a talent manager and managed the Nigerian artist Timaya whom he met at the "straight to star" talent hunt show event in Port Harcourt in 2006. Whilst Timaya was in the music category of the show, Lloyd was in the acting category of the show.

== Award and nomination ==
- Nominated for Most Promising Actor of the Year (English) at the City People Entertainment Awards in 2016.

== Personal life ==
Lloyd's father was an engineer who worked for Shell oil company in Nigeria and encouraged Lloyd to become an engineer as well and was upset with Lloyd for abandoning his engineering career for acting after obtaining a degree in civil engineering.

In 2019, Daniel Lloyd married a Nollywood actress Empress Njamah.

== Filmography ==
- Timeless Love (2016) as Jesse
- The Wrong Number (2016) as Niyi
- Love Triangle (2017)
- Our Dirty Little Secrets (2017)
- The Chronicles (2018)
- The Friend Zone (2017) as Dennis
- A Love Story (2017)
- Hire A Man (2017) as Mike
- The Real Side Chicks (2017) as Raymond
- Flirting with Fifty (2017)
- Hello (2016)
- Gidi Blues (2016) as Jaiye Thomas
- Desperate Baby Mama (2015) as Greg
- Forever Within Us (2015)
- Pradah as Patrick
- Tempted to Touch (2006)
- Akpe: Return of the Beast (2019)
- Fatal Attraction (2020) as Stanley
- Lonely Nights (2021) as Douglas
- Albatross (2022) as Umar
- Recompense (2023) as Azubuike
- Once Upon a Vow (2024) as Kenneth
- Aso Ebi Diaries (2025)
