= Mamma Mia (1995 film) =

Mama Mia
- Directed by: Bob Smith Jnr
- Release date: 1995
- Country: Ghana
- Language: English

Mamma Mia is a Ghanaian film directed by and starring Bob Smith Jnr in 1995. Set in Verona as well as Accra, it was one of the earlier films to focus on the lives of Ghanaians living in Europe.

The film was the first of three films in a series sharing that name the others being Double Trouble (Mamma Mia Part 2) (1998) and Black is Black (Mamma Mia 3) (2000).

== Cast ==
- Bob Smith Jnr
