= Kalsoume Sinare =

Ghanaian actress

Her Excellency Kalsoume Sinare Baffoe
- Born: 1967 (age 58–59)
- Citizenship: Ghanaian
- Occupations: Ambassador, actress and model
- Notable credits: Babina; Trinity; Sala
- Political party: National Democratic Congress
- Spouse: Anthony Baffoe
- Relatives: Said Sinare (brother)
- Awards: Golden Movie Awards

Kalsoume Sinare Baffoe (née Kalsoume Sinare) is Ghana’s Ambassador to the Kingdom of Spain, prior to this, she was an actress, model, filmmaker, and public figure with a career spanning nearly four decades. She has appeared in over fifty films, including Babina, Trinity, and Sala, for which she received a Golden Actress award in the Drama category.

== Early life and career ==
Sinare is the first of nine children in her family. She attended Accra High School, after which she started her entertainment career as a model. She represented Ghana and won the 1990 Miss Model of the World pageant,. She regularly appeared on television as a commercial model for consumer products.

Sinare transitioned into acting, making her screen debut in the stage production Theatre Mirrors before starring in films such as Out of Sight, Babina, Trinity, and Sala, among more than fifty productions. She became "immensely popular" in Ghana after she played the lead role in Babina, a religiously-themed horror film. She has appeared in over fifty films, including 4ever Young, The Five Brides, and The New Sun. Her role in the 2010 film Trinity earned a Zulu African Film Academy Awards nomination for Best Supporting Actress as well as a Best Supporting Actress nomination at the Ghana Movie Awards. She received a second Ghana Movie Awards nomination for Best Supporting Actress for her role in the 2013 film 3 Some. In 2017 her lead role in the film Sala won the Golden Actress award in the Drama category at the Golden Movie Awards. On 18 March 2026, President John Dramani Mahama officially commissioned Kulsoume Sinare Baffoe as Ghana’s Ambassador to the Kingdom of Spain. Baffoe will be responsible for fostering bilateral cooperation, promoting trade and investment, and advancing Ghana’s foreign policy objectives in Spain.

== Personal life ==
Sinare married Ghanaian international footballer Anthony Baffoe in 1994. Both Sinare and Baffoe are Muslims. Sinare has publicly supported the National Democratic Congress in Ghanaian elections, and participated in the 2013 inauguration ceremony for John Mahama, whom she endorsed again in 2016. She is the sister of Ghanaian politician and former Ambassador to Saudi Arabia Said Sinare.

== Filmography ==
| Year | Title | Role | Notes |
|---|---|---|---|
| 1993 | Out of Sight | Sally | |
| 2000 | Babina | Babina | |
| 2006 | Mummy's Daughter | Gladys | |
| 2007 | Princess Tyra | Agnes | |
| 2010 | 4 Play | Madine | |
| 2010 | 4ever Young | Salimat Ellen Mahama | |
| 2010 | Trinity | | Nominated for Best Supporting Actress, Zulu African Film Academy Awards; Nominated for Best Supporting Actress, Ghana Movie Awards |
| 2013 | 3 Some | | Nominated for Best Supporting Actress, Ghana Movie Awards |
| 2014 | Jackie Goes to School | Queen | |
| 2017 | The New Sun | | |
| 2017 | Sala | | Won Golden Actress, Golden Movie Awards |
| 2018 | Getting Married | Jordan's Mum | |
| 2019 | P over D | Mrs. Ampomaa | Comedy/Drama/Romance |
| 2019 | Away Bus | Aunty Muni | |
| 2021 | Accra Hustlers | Mrs. Paula | Drama |
| 2022 | Woe to Men | Ramatu | Comedy |
| 2023 | A Taste of Sin | Grace | Drama |
| 2024 | Silence | Yaayo | Drama |
| 2024 | 1957 | | |
