= Prince Yawson =

Ghanaian actor and comedian (1957–2022)

- Born: c. 1957; Ghana
- Died: August 1, 2022; Accra, Ghana
- Other name: Waakye
- Occupations: Actor, comedian

Prince Yawson (1957 – 1 August 2022), also known as Waakye, was a Ghanaian actor and comedian.

== Filmography ==
- Obra
- Yaa Asantewaa
- Babina
- Chorkor Trotro
- Jagger Pee
- Living Arts Show
- Ogboo
- Man Woman
- Diabolo

== Death ==
He died at the 37 Military Hospital, on 1 August 2022, at the age of 65.

== See also ==
- Eddie Coffie
