= Nii Odoi Mensah =

Ghanaian Actor

- Died: 3 December 2016
- Citizenship: Ghanaian
- Occupation: Actor
- Known for: Agony of Christ, 6 Hours To Christmas

Nii Odoi Mensah (died 3 December 2016) was a Ghanaian actor. He was the president of the Ghana Actors Guild.

== Filmography ==
- My Mother's Heart (2005)
- Agony of Christ (2008)
- 6 Hours To Christmas (2010) as Francis
- Queen of Dreams (2011) as John Uni
- Forbidden City (2012) as Mr. Prespeh

== See also ==
- Eddie Coffie
