= Akpe: Return of the Beast =

2019 Nigerian action drama film

- Directed by: Toka McBaror
- Written by: Chris Nzekwe
- Produced by: Justice Nuagbe
- Starring: Jide Kosoko; Juliet Ibrahim; Bolanle Ninalowo; Daniel Lloyd; Eniola Badmus
- Release date: 27 October 2019; (Nigeria)
- Running time: 95 minutes
- Country: Nigeria
- Language: English

Akpe: Return of the Beast, is a 2019 Nigerian action drama film directed by Toka McBaror and produced by Justice Nuagbe. The film stars Jide Kosoko in the lead role whereas Juliet Ibrahim, Bolanle Ninalowo, Daniel Lloyd and Eniola Badmus made supportive roles.

The film made its premier on 27 October 2019.

== Cast ==
- Jide Kosoko as Akpe
- Juliet Ibrahim
- Bolanle Ninalowo
- Daniel Lloyd
- Eniola Badmus
- Daniel K. Daniel
- Ushbebe Comedian
- Efe Irele
- Lydian John
- Oluwatoyin Albert Tomama
- Mr. Jollof
