= Bob Smith Junior =

Ghanaian actor and director

- Other names: Diabolo Man
- Occupations: Actor and movie director

Bob Smith Junior, also known as Diabolo Man, is a Ghanaian veteran actor, producer, director and writer. He is known for various roles he played in movies like Diabolo and Mamma Mia.

== Filmography ==
- Diabolo
- Mamma Mia
- Coming To Ghana
- Sika Mu Sakawa

== See also ==
- Eddie Coffie
