= Diabolo (film) =

1992 Ghanaian film

- Directed by: Bob Smith Junior
- Release date: 1992
- Country: Ghana
- Language: English

Diabolo is a 1992 Ghanaian film that tells the story of a man who has the power to transform into a serpent. He uses this power to sexually assault and kill women, mostly sex workers. The character is played by Bob Smith Junior, subsequently popularly referred to as Diabolo Man or Snake Man.

The film has been studied as an example of Pentecostal influence in Ghanaian film.

== Cast ==
- Bob Smith Junior
- Eddie Coffie
- Eunice Banini
- Prince Yawson (Wakye)
