= Chorkor Trotro =

Ghanaian television series

Chorkor Trotro is a Ghanaian comedy series which aired on TV3 between around 2014 and 2018.

== Overview ==
This comedy series, mainly in Twi and pidgin portrays the daily experience of people with "Trotro" minibuses in Ghana. It is centered on the hustles of a bus driver and his conductor (referred to as "mate" in Ghana) and their interactions with passengers. The setting of this series is a bus station at Chorkor, a suburb of the Greater Accra region in Ghana, hence the title of this series being "Chorkor Trotro".

== Cast ==
- Funny Face (comedian) as Chemu
- Prince Yawson as Baba
- Ekow Jones as Wofa Sam
- Maame Esi
- Charsey
- Awele
