= Babina (film) =

- Directed by: Ashangbor Akwetey Kanyi
- Written by: Leila Afua Djansi Ashangbor Akwetey Kanyi
- Produced by: Ashangbor Akwetey Kanyi
- Release date: 2000
- Country: Ghana
- Language: English

Babina is a 2000 Ghanaian film written by screenwriters Leila Afua Djansi and Ashangbor Akwetey Kanyi. The film tells a story about a conflict between a witch called Babina, who was sent to the world to destroy the life of man, and the men of God who oppose her. It is an African horror film. Babina is played by actress Kalsoume Sinare.

...the spirit woman Bambina, who snatches the husband of a barren woman, gives birth to an evil spirit child, and terrorizes her environment with her spiritual gaze, which brings sickness, mishap, and death.

== Cast ==
- Kalsoume Sinare
- Emmanuel Armah
- Berky Perkins
- Helen Omaboe
- Nii Saka Brown
- Nana Baah Boakye
- Prince Yawson (Wakye)
