= Ama K. Abebrese =

British-Ghanaian actress and producer

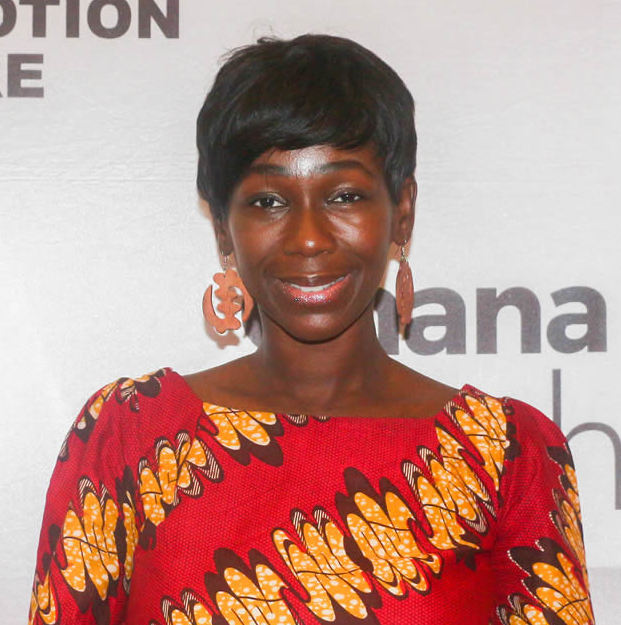
- Ama K. Abebrese
- Born: Ama Konadu Abebrese; 3 May 1980 (age 46); Kumasi, Ghana
- Education: Burlington Danes Academy; William Morris Sixth Form; St Mary's University, Twickenham
- Occupations: Actress, television presenter, producer
- Awards: Best Actress in a Leading Role, 2011 AMAA Awards
- Website: amakonline.com

Ama Konadu Abebrese (born 3 May 1980) is a British-Ghanaian actress, television presenter and producer. She was born in Ghana and raised in West London in the United Kingdom. She won the 2011 Best Actress in a Leading Role at the AMAA Awards for her stellar performance in Sinking Sands. Her film credits include Azali, which was selected as Ghana’s first submission for the Academy Award for Best International Feature Film, and the 2015 Netflix film Beasts of No Nation., and the 2015 Netflix movie Beasts of No Nation (directed by Cary Fukunaga and starring Idris Elba). She is listed among Africa's Top 20 Actors and Actresses by FilmContacts.com. She is the narrator and a producer on the Blitz Bazawule film The Burial of Kojo, which was acquired by Array and was released on Netflix.

In February 2024, she was appointed as a Goodwill Ambassador for the International Organization for Migration (IOM) Ghana, alongside musician Kofi Kinaata.

She began her TV presenting career in her teens at YCTV in London. She has presented on BBC2, OBE TV, Viasat 1, TV3, Ebonylife TV, and others.

== Education ==
She attended William Morris Sixth Form in Hammersmith after completing secondary school at Burlington Danes Academy. She holds a Bachelor of Arts in Media Arts and Drama obtained at St Mary's University, Twickenham.

== Career ==
Abebrese started her training at YCTV (Youth Culture Television) in London, an organization started by Sabrina Guinness on the TV show Challenge Anneka. She was a presenter on BBC2 youth show Pass da Mic and a guest presenter on the English File educational series. She developed a love for acting after joining the Lyric Theatre (Hammersmith) Summer Company as a youth. Abebrese was a regular TV presenter on the now defunct OBE TV in London, hosting and producing on a number of shows including One Touch, and the entertainment chat show On The Sofa, where guests she has interviewed range from Akon to Ziggy Marley. She has interviewed the likes of Harrison Ford, Ne-Yo, Rihanna, and Star Wars director George Lucas among notable others.

Her film credits include the international multiple award-winning film Sinking Sands, directed by 2011 BAFTA LA and Pan African Film Festival prize winner Leila Djansi. The film received 12 nominations at the 2010 Ghana Movie Awards, including "Best Actress in a Leading Role", the film won four awards, including "Best Film". Other film credits are Revele film's Elmina and London Get Problem. She starred and co-produced the movie Double-Cross, which won two awards for "Best Cinematography" and "Best Hair and Makeup" at the 2015 Ghana Movie Awards.

She is the former Head of Own Productions and Executive Producer at Viasat 1 television station in Ghana. She was the host of A Day in the Life TV show which aired on Viasat 1; she co hosted New Day on TV3 weekday mornings.

In 2013, she, alongside Nollywood actress Dakore and comedian Ayo Makun, hosted the 2013 edition of the AMAA Awards.

She was named among C Hub magazine's 100 most influential 'African Women Influencers' of the era 2014/15. She was ranked the Number 1 Most Influential TV and Radio Host 2015 on the Ghana Social Media Rankings List

== Filmography ==
Key
†	Denotes projects that have not yet been released

Year	Title	Role	Notes
2010	Sinking Sands	Pabi	Drama
2010	Elmina		
2011	Ties That Bind	Buki Ocansey	Drama
2014	Double-Cross	Effie Howard	Thriller
2015	Beasts of No Nation	Mother	Drama/War
2015	The Cursed Ones	Chinue	Drama/Thriller
2017	Lotanna	Zara	Drama/Thriller
2018	Azali	Joan	Drama
2018	The Burial of Kojo	Narrator	Drama/Thriller
2020	Lagos to Oslo	Iruka	Crime/Drama
2022	The Storm †	Detective Lynn	Post-production

== Promotional work ==
In 2014, Ama was unveiled as Dark and Lovely's Brand Ambassador for Ghana.

== Causes ==
=== Say no to skin bleaching ===
Ama is the founder of the "I Love My Natural Skintone. Say NO to Skin Bleaching" campaign, which she launched in 2014, it seeks to address issues of colorism and encourage Africans and people of color to embrace their natural skin tones and resist from the often harmful practice of skin bleaching.

=== Child safety icon ===
Abebrese is a "Child Safety Icon" for the charity SafeChild Ghana, an organization whose primary goal is to keep the children safe from harm.

=== Free rape medical kits ===
Abebrese launched a petition in July 2020 in Ghana calling on the government to waive fees attached to the medical examinations of rape victims. The fees being charged became an impediment because without a proper medical examination no prosecution could be undertaken by the police and majority of the rape victims could not afford the fees. This led to a nationwide campaign which got her a meeting with the First Lady of Ghana Rebecca Akufo-Addo and Gender Minister Cynthia Morrison to implore the government to scrap the fees associated with the examination kits.

== Awards and nominations ==
Year	Award	Category	Work	Result
2010	Ghana UK-Based Achievement Awards	Media Personality	—N/a	Won
2011	Zimbabwe International Film Festival	Best Actress	Sinking Sands	Won
2011	Africa Movie Academy Awards	Best Actress in a Leading Role	Sinking Sands	Won
2011	Nigeria Entertainment Awards	Best Pan African Actress	—N/a	Nominated
2011	Screen Nation Film & TV Awards	Best West African Actress	Ties That Bind	Nominated
2011	Ghana Movie Awards	Best Discovery	Ties That Bind	Nominated
2012	Africa Movie Academy Awards	Best Actress in a Leading Role	Ties That Bind	Nominated
2012	Golden Icons Academy Movie Awards	Best New Actress	Sinking Sands	Nominated
2013	Screen Nation Film & TV Awards	African Film Personality	—N/a	Won
2013	AU Diaspora African Mission	Salute to the Diaspora Award	—N/a	Won
2014	Noble Woman Award	Noble Care Foundation	—N/a	Won
2014	City People Entertainment Awards	TV Hostess of the Year (Ghana)	A Day in the Life show	Won
2014	Ghana Movie Awards	Best Actress in a Leading Role	Double-Cross	Nominated
2015	Golden Movie Awards	Favourite Golden Actress	—N/a	Nominated
2015	Ghana Movie Awards	Actress in a Supporting Role	The Cursed Ones	Nominated
2016	Golden Movie Awards	Golden Supporting Actress Drama	The Cursed Ones	Won
2016	Nigeria Entertainment Awards	Non Nigerian Actress	Beasts of No Nation	Nominated
2017	Newark International Film Festival	Best Actress	Sink or Swim. The Perilous Journey	Won
2018	Ghana Movie Awards	Best Actress in a Supporting Role	Azali	Nominated
