= Somewhere in Africa =

- Theatrical poster
- Directed by: Frank Rajah Arase
- Written by: Frank Rajah Arase
- Screenplay by: Pascal Amanfo
- Produced by: Kwame Boadu
- Starring: Majid Michel; Martha Ankomah; Eddie Nartey; Kofi Adjorlolo; Roselyn Ngissah
- Production companies: Heroes Films Production; Raj Films
- Release date: July 30, 2011
- Countries: Ghana; Nigeria

Somewhere in Africa: The Cries of humanity is a 2011 Ghanaian drama film directed by Frank Rajah Arase, starring Majid Michel, Martha Ankomah and Kofi Adjorlolo. It received 7 nominations at the 9th Africa Movie Academy Awards including categories: Best Actor in a Leading Role, Achievement in Soundtrack, Achievement in Visual effects and Achievement in Make-Up. Majid Michel was the recipient of the film's only award.

== Cast ==
- Majid Michel as General Yusuf Mombasa
- Majid Michel as Frank Leuma, Reverend Francis Jackson
- Martha Ankomah as Nivera
- Eddie Nartey as Pascal
- Kofi Adjorlolo as General Olemba
- Roselyn Ngissah as Captain Rajile
- David Dontoh as President Gabiza

== Reception ==
Nollywood Reinvented gave it a 43% rating, praised its soundtrack, cinematography and screenplay.

== Awards ==
It received 7 nominations at the 9th Africa Movie Academy Awards for categories: Achievement in Production Design, Achievement in Costume Design, Achievement in Make-Up, Achievement in Soundtrack, Achievement in Visual effects, Best Young/Promising Actor, and Best Actor in a Leading Role. Majid Michel was the recipient of the film's only award.
