= 2015 Golden Movie Awards =

African film award ceremony

The 2015 Golden Movie Awards were the maiden edition of an African award event organized annually to award individuals for their outstanding performance in the movie industry. The first ceremony was held at the State Banquet Hall in Accra, Ghana.
