= Solomon Sampah =

Ghanaian Actor

- Born: Solomon Nii Otokonor Sampah; 1945; James Town, British Accra
- Died: 2016 (aged 70–71)
- Other names: Pap Solo; Quench Walahi; Paa Solo
- Citizenship: Ghanaian
- Occupation: Actor
- Years active: 1945–2016
- Notable work: Foul Play, Queen's Bride, Owuo Safoa, Ultimate Paradise, The Agony of Christ

Solomon Nii Otokonor Sampah also known as Solomon Sampah, Pap Solo, Paa Solo, and Quench Walahi (14 February 1945 – 22 January 2016) was a Ghanaian actor. He was known for the commercial he did for Original Hacks.

== Early life ==
Solomon was born in James Town, British Accra. He was a singer and dancer with Slim's Traditional Band with the Anansekromian Sounds of the erstwhile National Folkloric Company.

== Career ==
He was an actor with the National Drama Company formed in the early 1960s, and also with the Abibigromma group where he retired. He played the congas and assorted percussion for the Amartey Hedzoleh Band which recorded the soundtrack for King Ampah's Kukurantumi: Road to Accra film in 1983 and was the Welfare Officer for Ghana's Actors Guild (GAG).

== Filmography ==
- Foul Play
- Queen's Bride
- Owuo Safoa
- Ultimate Paradise
- The Agony of Christ
