= 2016 Golden Movie Awards =

African film award

2016 Golden Movie Awards is an annual award that celebrates outstanding achievement in African television and film. The event took place on Saturday June 25, 2016, at the Kempiski Hotel. It was hosted by DKB and Anita Erskine of EIB network.

== Winners ==
- Golden Actress Drama – Zynell Zuh
- Golden Supporting Actress Drama – Ama K. Abrebese
- Golden Supporting Actor (Comedy) – Kofi Adjorlolo (Ghana Must Go)
- Golden Actor In Drama – Gideon Okeke (GbomoGbomo Express)
