= Pascal Aka =

Ivorian director

- Born: July 17, 1985 (age 40); Abidjan, Ivory Coast
- Education: University of Carleton
- Occupations: Film director, producer, writer, actor, music video director
- Known for: Production of Double-Cross
- Awards: Ghana Movie Awards

Pascal Aka (born in Ivory Coast, July 17, 1985) is an Ivorian film director, actor, music video director and producer, very well known for his work on "Jamie and Eddie: Souls of Strife (2007)", "Evol (2010)",Double-Cross which got several nominations at the Ghana Movies Award 2014.

== Early career ==
Born in Abidjan, Ivory Coast, Pascal Aka grew up in Ghana. He attended Ontario based University of Carleton where he studied " film studies program" and a former trainee at the Independent Filmmaker's Cooperative of Ottawa, at which he served as the Director's General, Chairman of the Diversity Committee and Vice President. He produced his debut movie "Jamie and Eddie: Souls of Strife" which he produced, directed and co-starred at age 21. After 9 years in Canada, Pascal returned to Ghana and started his own production company called "Breakthrough Media Productions".

== Filmography ==
| Year | Film | Role |
|---|---|---|
| 2007 | Jamie and Eddie: Souls of Strife (Short) | Writer, director, producer |
| 2010 | Evol | Writer, producer, director |
| 2011 | Mind Rush | Writer, producer, director |
| 2012 | Redemption | Writer, producer, director |
| 2013 | Mr. Q | Writer, producer, director, |
| 2014 | Double-Cross (Short) | Director |
| 2014 | The Banku Chronicles (Short) | Director, producer, writer |
| 2015 | Interception | Associate Producer, director |
| 2015 | Ghana Police (Short) | Writer, producer, editor, director |
| 2016 | Her First Time (Short) | Producer, director |
| 2017 | Black Rose | Producer, director, writer |

== Awards and recognition ==
| Year | Award | Category | Film | Result |
|---|---|---|---|---|
| 2009 | Action on Film International Film Festival | Best Action Sequence | Jamie and Eddie: Souls of Strife | Won |
| 2009 | Action on Film International Film Festival | Best Foreign Film Feature | Jamie and Eddie: Souls of Strife | Nominated |
| 2010 | Action on Film International Film Festival | Best Action Sequence – Feature | Evol | Nominated |
| 2010 | Action on Film International Film Festival | Best Guerrilla Film – Feature | Evol | Nominated |
| 2014 | Ghana Movie Awards | Best Director | Double-Cross | Nominated |
| 2014 | Ghana Movie Awards | Best Picture | Double-Cross | Won |
| 2014 | Ghana Movie Awards | Best Cinematography | Double-Cross | Won |
| 2014 | Ghana Movie Awards | Best Short Film | Ghana Police | Won |
| 2014 | Accra Francophone Film Festival | Best Comedy | Mr. Q | Won |
| 2016 | Real Time International Film Festival (RTF) | Best African Short Film | Her First Time | Won |
| 2016 | Africa in Motion Film Festival | Best Short Film | Black Rose | Nominated |
