= Shola Ayorinde =

Nigerian film editor

Shola Ayorinde is a Nigerian film editor. Ayorinde won the 2017 Best of Nollywood Awards and has been nominated for the Africa Magic Viewers' Choice Awards in 2013 and 2024.

== Early life and education ==
Shola Ayorinde is an indigene of Iloro, Ekiti State, Nigeria. He attended Methodist Primary School and Methodist Secondary School in Ilesa, Osun State for his primary and secondary education.

== Career ==
Ayorinde has worked extensively in Nigeria's film industry as a film editor, since 2001.

He has been credited on several Nollywood projects, including Over Sabi Aunty, Married but Living Single, Murder at Prime Suites, and the television series Wura. His editing work has been noted for its contribution to storytelling and production quality in Nigerian cinema.

== Awards and nominations ==
Ayorinde has received industry recognition for his work in film editing. He has been nominated at the Africa Magic Viewers' Choice Awards (AMVCA), including nominations in 2013 and 2024.

He won the Best Editor award at the 2014 Yoruba Movies Award and the Best Editing award at the Best of Nollywood Awards in 2017.
