= Shampaign =

2016 Ghanaian television series

Shampaign is a 2016 Ghanaian political drama television series written by Shirley Frimpong-Manso and co-produced with Ken Attoh. The series has two seasons, each consisting of 13 episodes.

== Plot ==
A politician, Naana Akua Quansah, seeks to become the country's first female president. As she campaigns with her team, citizens across the country buy into her ideology, giving her the support of a majority of voters. Events take a turn when she is involved in an accident that leaves her in a coma. Her team devises a new strategy by having her twin sister stand in for her in a bid to win power.

== Cast ==
- Joselyn Dumas as Naana Akua Quansah
- Jot Agyemang as Kofi Malm
- Blossom Chukwujeku as Francis Peters
- Kofi Bucknor as Nene Adodoadji
- Daniel Kojo Delong as Patrick Nunoo
- Jeffery Forson as Obiri
- Zynnell Lydia Zuh as Priscilla Peters
- Anima Misa Amoah as Kate Malm
- Ofie Kodjoe as Mrs. Hyde
- Tinell Dickens as Elizabeth Vanderpuije
- Madelein Abedi-Boafo as Miranda Graves Nunoo
- Akofa Edjeani as Menaye Quansah
- Lyn Ethel Benil as Julia Hawkins
- John Dumelo as Jonas Vanderpuije
- Mikey Ashkar as Jason Williams
- Kingsley Yamoah as George Sarpong
- Jamillah Sulleyman as Frema
- Agbeki (Bex) Mortty as Duke Ofori
- Fred Kanebi as Donald Arthur
- David Oscar as Dabo
- Godwin Namboh as Christian Commodore
- Shirely Emma Tibilla as Charlotte Malm
- Marian Addo as Ashiokor
- Fred Amugi as Ankrah
- Miriam Ama Saaka as Aku Brown
- Kabuki Akiwumi as Mary-Ann Wilson
- Princess Fathia Nkrumah as Deborah Ceasar
- Augustine Abbey (Idikoko) as Mr. Hawkson
