= Martha Ankomah =

Ghanaian actress

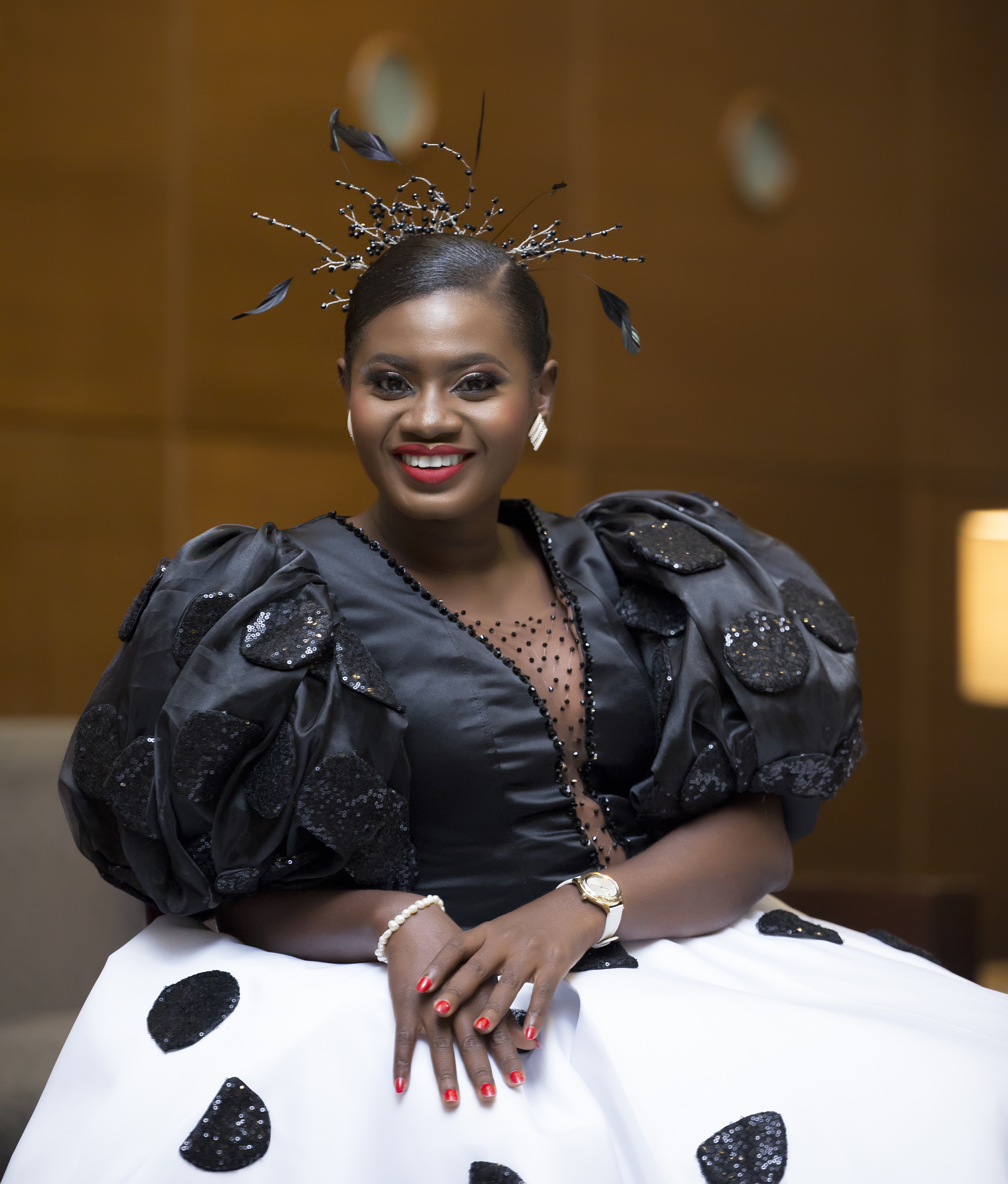
- Born: November 21, 1986 (age 39); Accra, Ghana
- Education: Jayee University College
- Occupations: Actress; entrepreneur
- Years active: 1994–present

Martha Ankomah is a Ghanaian film actress and entrepreneur.

== Personal life and education ==
Ankomah was born on November 21, 1985 as the only child of her mother. She recalled encountering several challenges during her childhood. She is an alumna of Adabraka Presbyterian Junior High School, Labone Senior High School, and Jayee University College, all located in Accra. Ankomah stated in an interview with the host of the Okukuseku show, that she wished she were married with three children, but said she would wait on God.

== Career ==
According to her, she began acting in 1994. After taking part in several auditions for movies, and acting in some television series and films. She entered the Next Movie Star reality show, and placed third in the 2007 edition. Ankomah disclosed during an interview with Hitz FM in 2016 that henceforth, she would promote positive change in the society. In September 2018, she clarified her position, explaining that she could assume any role in a film as long as it conveyed a positive message to its audience. In 2017, Ankomah was criticized by some film stakeholders when she questioned the superficial narratives of Ghanaian films. She expressed concern that the industry needed to change the themes of its films in other to develop. Film directors felt her statement was disrespectful and lacked merit in knowledge of the art of filmmaking. In November 2018, she launched a campaign to encourage young people to read.

== Filmography ==
- Suncity
- Honeymoon Hotel (2014)
- Where is your Mobile?
- Power of the gods
- Shakira (2009) - Amanda
- Sin of the Soul (2009)
- Heart of Men (2009) - Diana
- Somewhere in Africa (2011) - Nivera
- Silence (2024) - Narkie
- A Trip To Hell (2014) - Bella
- Million Dollar Baby (2014) - Cindy
- Deadline (2012)
- Bed of Roses (2011) as Zina
- A Happy Surprise (2022) as Kukua

== Awards ==
- 2010 Africa Movie Academy Award for Most Promising Actor
- 2012 Africa Movie Academy Award for Most Promising Actor
- 2012 Ghana Movie Awards - Best Actress in a lead role
- 2011 Ghana Movie Awards - Best Actress in a Supporting Role
- 2011 Ghana Movie Awards - Favourite actress (movie)
- 2015 Ghana Movie Awards - Best Actress in a lead role

== Business and ventures ==
=== Endorsements ===
In 2014, Ankomah signed an endorsement deal with Vitamilk Viora. Dusk Capital Limited, a Ghanaian Investment Bank in 2017 also revealed that Ankomah was their brand ambassador. She has worked with Globacom since 2018 as a brand ambassador. Additionally, in 2018, Ankomah was named the brand ambassador for Ghana Textiles Printers' (GTP) new fabric 'Adepa Dumas'.

In August 2021, she endorsed Latif Abubakar's Something must kill a man' play in a video where she claimed the play had a lot to offer to the public.

=== Beauty Business ===
In July 2013, Ankomah officially opened her beauty salon 'Martha's Place' in Accra. The salon offers treatments for men and women.

=== Foundation ===
Martha Ankomah Foundation was launched in 2016, a social organization founded by Ankomah to provide health awareness, child care support programs, livelihood empowerment, and community development projects. Martha through her foundation has donated stationery and other learning materials to many deprived communities including school children at Ackrobon in the Awutu Senya District.

The foundation works together with Autism Ambassadors to develop autism awareness and support children living with autism
