= Joselyn Dumas =

Ghanaian television host and actress

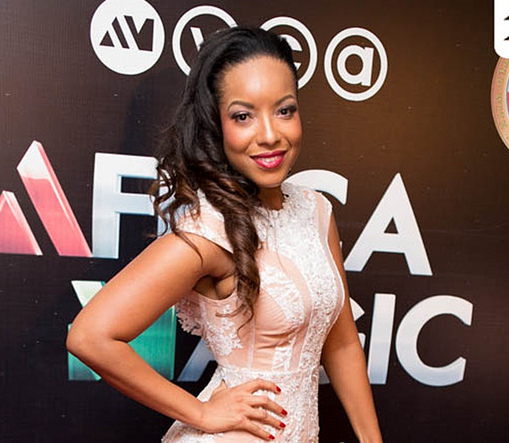
- Dumas at the 2014 Africa Magic Viewers Choice Awards
- Born: Joselyn Canfor Dumas; 31 August 1980 (age 46); Ghana
- Occupations: Actress; television host
- Years active: 2009–present
- Website: www.joselyndumas.net

Joselyn Dumas (/ˌdʒɔːsəlɪn ˈdʊmɑː/; born 31 August 1980) is a Ghanaian television host and actress. In 2014, she starred in A Northern Affair, a role that earned her a Ghana Movie Award and an Africa Movie Academy Award nomination for Best Actress.

== Early life and education ==
Dumas was born in Ghana and spent most of her early childhood in Accra. She had her basic education at Morning Star School and proceeded to the Archbishop Porter Girls High School, where she was elected as the entertainment prefect. Dumas furthered her studies in the United States, where she earned a degree in administrative law.

She worked as a paralegal before relocating to Ghana to pursue a career as a television personality.

== Media career ==
=== Television ===
Dumas made her television appearance as the host of Charter House's Rhythm, an entertainment show, where she interviewed many celebrities. She was recruited by ViaSat 1 to host their first in-house flagship talk show, The One Show, which aired from 2010 to 2014. She was the host of the television talk show At Home with Joselyn Dumas, which aired across Africa and parts of Europe.

Dumas is the founder and CEO of Virgo Sun Company Limited, a production company that co-produced the film, Love or Something Like That, endorsed by UNAIDS. She produced V Republic, a television series by Sparrow Productions, with executive production by Virgo Sun..

=== Film ===
Dumas' performance in The Perfect Pictures led to further film roles. Two years later, she appeared in Shirley Frimpong-Manso's film series Adam's Apples. Her portrayal of Jennifer Adams in Adams Apples earned her a nomination for Best Actress in a Lead Role, alongside Hollywood actress Kimberly Elise, at the 2011 Ghana Movie Awards. Since entering the acting scene in Ghana, Dumas has appeared in films and television series such as Love or Something Like That, A Sting in a Tale, The Perfect Picture, A Northern Affair and Lekki Wives. She has starred alongside other African actors, including John Dumelo, Majid Michel and OC Ukeje.

Dumas co-hosted the 2018 Golden Movie Awards Africa with Ayo Makun, held at the Movenpick Ambassador Hotel in Accra on 2 June 2018.

=== Music ===
Dumas featured as the bride in the music video for Lynxxx's song "Fine Lady" featuring Wizkid.

== Philanthropy and other ventures ==
Dumas established the Joselyn Canfor-Dumas Foundation (JCDF) to support vulnerable children in Ghana. The JCDF undertook a project focused on autism.

Dumas co-produced the Miss Malaika Ghana beauty pageant from 2008 to 2010. She has served as a brand ambassador for Range Rover Evoque Ghana and Jobberman Ghana, a job advertisement company. In 2025, Dumas and media personality Nathan Kwabena Anokye Adisi were named brand ambassadors for GoldBod Jewellery, a subsidiary of the Ghana Gold Board.

== Filmography ==
Year	Title	Role	Note
2009	Perfect Picture	Cameo Role	
2009	A Sting in a Tale	Esi	
2011	Adams Apples	Jennifer Adams	Drama
2011	Bed of Roses	Medical Doctor	
2012	Peep	Detective	
2014	A Northern Affair	Esaba	Romantic film
2014	Lekki Wives (season 2)	Aisha	
2014	Love or Something Like That	Dr. Kwaaley Mettle	Drama
2014	V Republic	Mansa	TV series
2015	Silver Rain	Adjoa	Drama
2015	Cartel the Genesis	Agent Naana	Action film
2016	Shampaign	Naana Akua Quansah	TV series
2017	Potato Potahto	Lulu	Comedy film
2017	John and John		
2019	Cold Feet	Omoye	Drama
2019	Perfect Picture - Ten Years Later	Flora Gaisie	Comedy / romance
2019	Tenants of the House	Hon. Elizabeth	
2021	Chasing Lullaby		Comedy drama
2022	Glamour Girls	Jemma	Drama
2022	Flawsome		TV series
2023	Madam	Lankai Morgan	TV series

== Awards and recognitions ==
Joselyn Dumas awards and nominations
Awards and nominations
Award	Wins	Nominations
Ghana Movie Awards	1	1
Radio and Television Personality Awards	1	3
4syte TV Awards	1	0
City People Entertainment Awards	2	0
Africa Movie Academy Awards	0	1
Africa Magic Viewers' Choice Awards	0	1
All Africa Media Networks Award	1	0
Ghana Movie Awards	1	2
Africa Magic Viewers' Choice Awards	0	1
GN Bank Awards	1	1
Blog Ghana Awards	1	1
Golden Movie Awards	1	1
Ghana Blog Awards	1	1
Ghana Make-Up Awards	1	1
Glitz Style Awards	1	2

Totals (Note: Certain award groups do not simply award one winner. They acknowledge several different recipients, have runners-up, and have third place. Since this is a specific recognition and is different from losing an award, runner-up mentions are considered wins in this award tally. For simplification and to avoid errors, each award in this list has been presumed to have had a prior nomination.)
- Wins: 9
- Nominations: 12

Year	Award	Category	Result
2011	Ghana Movie Awards (GMA)	Best Actress in a Leading Role	Nominated
2012	Radio and Television Personality Awards (RTP)	Best Entertainment Host of the Year	Won
2013	Radio and Television Personality Awards (RTP)	Radio/TV Personality of the Year; Female Entertainment Host of the Year; Female Presenter of the Year	Nominated
2013	4syte TV	Hottest Ghanaian Celebrity	Won
2013	Ghana Movie Awards (GMA)	Best Supporting Actress	Won
2013	City People Entertainment Awards	Stellar Contribution to the Movie and Media Industry in Africa; Tremendous Growth in the Movie Industry	Won
2014	Africa Movie Academy Awards (AMAA)	Best Actress in a Leading Role	Nominated
2014	Africa Magic Viewers' Choice Awards (AMVCA)	Best Actress in a Leading Role	Nominated
2014	All Africa Media Networks	Outstanding Personality in Creative Entrepreneurship	Won
2014	Ghana Movie Awards	Best Actress in a Lead Role	Won
2015	Africa Magic Viewers' Choice Awards (AMVCA)	Best Actress in a Drama	Nominated
2015	GN Bank Awards	Best Actress	Won
2015	Blog Ghana Awards	Best Instagram Page	Won
2016	Golden Movie Awards	Best Actress, TV Series Shampaign	Won
2016	Ghana Make-Up Awards	Most Glamorous Celebrity	Won
2016	Shortlisted	Among Africa's Top 3 Women in Entertainment	Won
2018	IARA UK	Best Actress	Won
