= Levi (film) =

- Written by: Bethrogers
- Starring: Ramsey Nouah; Nancy Isime; Deyemi Okanlawon; Lydia Forson; Bimbo Manuel
- Cinematography: Okechukwu Oku
- Edited by: Okey Oku
- Music by: Abiola
- Production companies: Oracle Films; Okey Oku Films
- Release date: 18 January 2019
- Country: Nigeria
- Language: English

Levi is a 2019 Nigerian drama film directed by Okechukwu Oku. It stars Ramsey Nouah, Nancy Isime, Deyemi Okanlawon, Lydia Forson and Bimbo Manuel.

== Plot ==
The film tells the story of Levi, who after being diagnosed with a life-threatening medical condition, decides to look for and get his childhood love interest, Somi, so they can finally be together before his death. However, Somi is already married, but Levi will not accept defeat.

== Cast ==
- Ramsey Nouah as Levi
- Joseph Benjamin as Jasper
- Nancy Isime as Somi
- Deyemi Okanlawon as Isreal
- Lydia Forson as the boss
- Bimbo Manuel as doctor
- Mordiyyah Obani as twin
- Rodiyyah Obani as twin
- Chinazor Anuo as female doctor
- Chinenye Nnaji as office extra
- Charles Murphy Iwuchukwu as guard
- Kingsley Okoye Rex as office extra
- Maxwell Nebo as Chief Obi
- Shire Nwachukwu as Gana
- Lisa Omorodion as Ebere
- Nneoma Okoro as nurse
- Bolaji Ogunmola as Gina

== Awards and nominations ==
Year	Award	Category	Result	Ref
2019	Best of Nollywood Awards	Best Actor in a Lead role – English	Nominated	
2019	Best of Nollywood Awards	Best Supporting Actor – English	Won	
2019	Best of Nollywood Awards	Movie with the Best Screenplay	Nominated	
2019	Best of Nollywood Awards	Movie with the Best Cinematography	Nominated	
2019	Best of Nollywood Awards	Movie of the Year	Nominated	
2019	Best of Nollywood Awards	Director of the Year	Nominated	
2019	Best of Nollywood Awards	Movie with the Best Soundtrack	Nominated	
