= Double-Cross (2014 film) =

2014 Ghanaian film by Pascal Aka

- Theatrical Release Poster
- Directed by: Pascal Aka
- Written by: D.R. Kufuor
- Produced by: Ama K. Abebrese; D.R. Kufuor
- Starring: Ama K. Abebrese; John Dumelo
- Cinematography: Pascal Aka; Prince Dovlo
- Edited by: Pascal Aka
- Music by: Roger Ebo Quansah; Mensa Ansah; Obrafuor
- Production companies: DBF Productions; Breakthrough Media Production
- Release date: October 31, 2014
- Running time: 88 minutes
- Country: Ghana
- Language: English

Double-Cross is a 2014 Ghanaian epic romantic thriller told, written, co-produced, by D.R. Kufuor. It stars Ama K. Abebrese and John Dumelo as the main cast of the movie. The movie was shot predominantly in the North Legon Area of Accra Ghana.

== Cast ==
- Ama K. Abebrese as Effie Howard
- John Dumelo as Danny Frimpong
- Adjetey Anang as Ben Boateng
- Paulina Oduro as Obaabeng Frimpong
- Jasmine Baroudi as Vickie Mensah
- Samuel Odoi-Mensah as Johnny Yawson

== Release ==
The World Première of Double-Cross was on October 31, 2014 at the Greenwich Odeon Cinema in London, England. The Ghana Première on February 6, 2014 at the Silverbird Cinema in Accra, Ghana.

== Critical response ==
The film was met with generally positive reviews from critics. Babso.Org was impressed with the intrigue and suspense at the end and would say it was a good movie better than most of the movies seen and had to review. Ghana celebrities did not particularly like the ending contrary to many comments by the attendants.

== Accolades ==
Year	Ceremony	Category	Nominated	Result
2014	Ghana Movie Awards	Actress in a Leading Role	Ama K. Abebrese	Nominated
2014	Ghana Movie Awards	Best Director	Pascal Aka	Nominated
2014	Ghana Movie Awards	Best Editing	Pascal Aka	Nominated
2014	Ghana Movie Awards	Best Cinematography	Pascal Aka & Prince Dovlo	Won
2014	Ghana Movie Awards	Make–Up & Hair Styling	Nana Ama Atsu	Won
2014	Ghana Movie Awards	Best Picture	D.R. Kufuor & Ama K. Abebrese	Nominated
