= 6 Hours to Christmas =

2010 Ghanaian film

- Directed by: Shirley Frimpong-Manso
- Produced by: Ken Attoh
- Release date: 29 October 2010
- Country: Ghana
- Language: English

6 Hours to Christmas is a Ghanaian romantic comedy film about Reggie, whose female colleague wants to give him a Christmas gift he finds hard to refuse.

== Cast ==
- Chris Attoh as Reggie
- Damilola Adegbite as Pebbles
- Benny Ashun as Troy
- Asamani Boateng as David
- Charles Cuammy as Hawker
- Soul Knight Jazz as M.D.
- Victoria Johnson as Mrs. Dzokoto
- Nii Odoi Mensah as Francis
- sena Tsikata as Mansa
- Marian Lempogo as Akos
