= Kyeiwaa =

Ghanaian actress

Rose Akua Attaa Mensah
- Born: Rose Akua Attaa Mensah; 25 May 1963 (age 63); Ghana
- Occupations: Media personality, Actress
- Years active: 2005 - Present
- Spouse: Mr. Michael Kissi Asare

Rose Akua Attaa Mensah (born 25 May 1963) is a Ghanaian actress who is best known as Kyeiwaa for her role in the Film Kyeiwaa.

== Career ==
Mensah started her career as a singer in the band African Brothers of which Nana Kwame Ampadu was the lead singer. She then appeared in the Akan Drama TV series. She was later introduced by Nana Bosomprah to the Cantata TV Drama as an actress through the Ghana Broadcasting Company.

Her passion blossomed in the late 90s and early 2000s, working alongside legends like Ajoss and Maame Dokono. She eventually became a household name in Kumawood film series, which ran across 12 parts and cemented her place in Ghana's golden age of cinema.

After relocating to the US in 2015, she stepped back from acting for a while. Before relocating abroad, rumors spread that she had insulted producers and without hearing her side, many filmmakers stopped working with her. This left her struggling financially, especially since the industry was already paying her very little. At abroad, Kyeiwaa found a job at a Ghanaian restaurant, cooking dishes like Banku. While she was proud of the job, some Ghanaians including people from the film industry mocked her for it when they visited and later spoke about her on radio back home in Ghana.

In 2020, she remarried Michael Kissi Asare, celebrating their union with a white wedding in Worcester.

In November 2024, Kyeiwaa urged Ghanaian youth to prioritize education, sharing how her limited schooling has made communication difficult in the U.S. She emphasized that education's value becomes clearer later in life.

== Filmography ==
- Kyeiwaa 1,2,3,4,5 (2007) as Kyeiwaa.
- Akurasi Burgers 1,2 & 3 (2008) as Akua atta
- 2016 1 & 2 (2010) as Maa Dorcas
- Ananse Spider-Man 1
- B14 (2012) as Lan Di
- The Code of Money and Death (2013) as Maa Eva
- Akonoba
- Cross Road
- Abebrese
- Ogyam

== Achievement ==
- Best Actress in a Leading Role (Local Language) - 2011
- She was a co-winner of the Best Actress Comedy.
- Favourite Actors Awards - 2015

== Personal life ==
Mensah began life as a housemaid after leaving her hometown of Mampong Nsuta. A queenmother to be took her to Kumasi, and later Accra. After years of struggle in the US, Kyeiwaa upgraded from her Massachusetts home to a lakeside apartment. she proudly showed the new house to colleague Yaw Dabo during an interview, noting that while the rent is on the high side, it's worth it.

Kyeiwaa married Micheal Kissi Asare in the United States Worcester, Massachusetts on Saturday, July 25, 2020. She currently resides in the US
