= Eddie Nartey =

Ghanaian actor

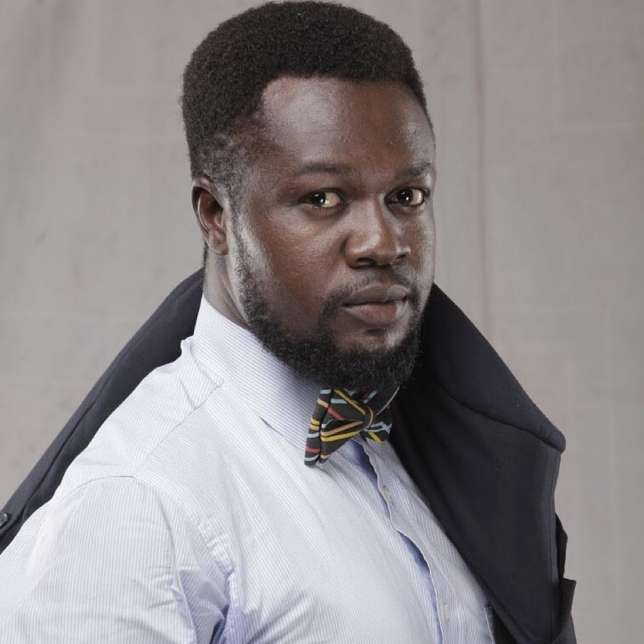
- Born: 6 November 1984 (age 41); Korle Gonno, Accra, Ghana
- Education: University of Ghana
- Occupations: Actor, Director, Producer
- Years active: 2004—present
- Notable work: Wedlock of the Gods; Return Of Beyonce; Crime To Christ; In The Eyes Of My Husband; Gallery of Comedy; Passion and Soul
- Awards: 2016 Golden Movie Awards; 2018 Ghana Movie Awards; 2018 Nelas Awards

Eddie Nartey (born 6 November 1984) is a Ghanaian actor, director, and film producer. His supporting role in Frank Rajah's Somewhere In Africa earned him a nomination at the Nollywood and African Film Critics Awardsf, and Ghana movie awards. He was nominated in the best actor category for "Kiss Me If You Can." He got his first opportunity to do his directorial debut entitled "Could This Be Love" where he co-wrote the movie with Evelyn, which cast Actors like Majid Michel, Kwadwo Nkansah (Lil Win), Nana Ama Mcbrown, Fred Amugi, and Gloria Sarfo.

He collaborated with Juliet Ibrahim on the movie Shattered Romance. He also wrote and directed the movie Royal Diadem.

He is related to British Actor / Director Danny Erskine.

== Early life ==
Eddie attended Korle Gonno Methodist primary and JSS in Accra for basic education. His secondary education was at Holy Trinity Cathedral Secondary School (HOTCASS). He attended the University of Ghana, Legon where he studied directing and earned a BFA in Fine Arts.

== Personal life ==
His wife died in January 2021 after two years of marriage.

== Filmography ==
He has acted in several films, including:

- Wedlock of the Gods
- In The Eyes Of My Husband
- Gallery of Comedy
- Last Battle
- Love & Crime
- Intimate Battle 1&2
- Believe Me
- The King Is Mine 1&2
- Return Of Beyonce (2006) - President's Bodyguard
- Crime To Christ (2007) - Milado
- Passion of the Soul (2008)
- Girls Connection (2008) - Casmir
- Agony of Christ (2008)
- Tears Of Womanhood 1&2 (2009) - David
- Ties That Bind (2011) - Godknows
- Somewhere In Africa 1&2 (2011) - Pascal
- Pool Party 1&2 (2011)
- The Silent Writer (2011)
- Testing The Waters (2012)
- Number One Fan (2013) - Kweku Mensah
- Shattered Romance (2014) - Cobra
- Chronicles of Odumkrom: The Headmaster (2015) - Kofi Bediako
- In April (2016) - Bright Ofori
- The New Adabraka (2018)
- The Don (2022) - Mike

He has directed and produced:

- Could This Be Love (2014)
- Shattered Romance (2014)
- Royal Diadem (2015)
- She Prayed (2015)
- Beautiful Ruins (2016)
- In April (2016)
- Samai
- Criss Cross
- The Corner TV Series
- Conversation
- The New Adabraka (2018)
- Frema
- Woman At War (2021)
- Kofi Abebrese (2021)
- Okada (2021)
- That Night (2022)

== Awards ==
Year	Award	Category	Result
2010	Ghana Movie Awards	Best Actor	Nominated
2011	Ghana Movie Awards	Best Actor	Nominated
2016	Golden Movie Awards	Best Screenplay	Won
2017	Nelas Awards	Best TV Series	Nominated
2018	Ghana Movie Awards	Best Screenplay	Won
2018	Ghana Movie Awards	Best Director	Nominated
2018	Ghana Movie Awards	Best Picture	Nominated
2018	Nelas Awards	Best Short Film	Won
2018	Nelas Awards	Best Producer	Won
