= Golden Movie Awards =

Annual award

- Current: 2019 Golden Movie Awards
- Awarded for: Outstanding achievement in the African television, digital media and film industries
- Country: Ghana
- Presented by: NMJ GHANA
- First award: 2015
- Website: http://goldenmovieawards.com/

Golden Movies Awards is an annual award that celebrates outstanding achievement in African television and film. The inaugural edition was held on 27 June 2015 at the State Banquet Hall, Ghana. In May 2016, Nadia Buari was unveiled as an ambassador for the award. The 2016 edition was hosted by Uti Nwachukwu and Selly Galley on 25 June.

== Categories ==
The following are the categories for the 2019 ceremony:

- Overall Golden Movie
- Golden Short Film
- Golden Cinematography
- Golden actor (TV series)
- Golden Discovery
- Golden Sound Editor
- Golden actress (TV series)
- Golden actress (comedy)
- Golden Story (comedy)
- Golden Story (drama)
- Golden writer
- Golden director
- Golden supporting actor (comedy)
- Golden soundtrack
- Golden actor (drama)
- Golden supporting actress (comedy)
- Golden actor (comedy)
- Golden supporting actor (drama)
- Golden supporting actress (drama)
- Golden actress (drama)
- Golden makeup
- Golden costume
- Golden editor
- Golden animation
- Overall Golden (TV series)
- Golden indigenous
- Golden documentary
- Golden most promising
- Golden Arts director
