= Sahndra Fon Dufe =

Cameroonian actress (born 1989)

- Born: Sandra Kiven Fondufe; 28 October 1989 (age 36); Bamenda, Cameroon
- Education: Our Lady of Lourdes College Mankon University of Buea
- Occupations: Actress, writer, producer
- Years active: 2009–present

Sahndra Fon Dufe (born 28 October 1989) is a Cameroonian actress, author, screenwriter, film producer, and CEO of the Indie production house African Pictures International. She has appeared in several international movies, including One Night in Vegas and Black November. Cameroonian singer Said Barah has referred to her as "Young Oprah" in one of his songs called Sahndra Fon Dufe, in admiration for her creative ingenuity and inspirational influence for young women all over Africa.

== Background ==
Fon Dufe's first film roles were in local Cameroonian films like Standing the Rain (2009) and Two Princes (2010). She subsequently appeared in the NollyWood independent film by Kelechi Eke, Lost in Abroad (2012) and performed with Wyclef Jean, Akon, and Hakeem Kae-Kazim in Black November (2012)

At age 23, Fon Dufe's performance in the award-winning romantic comedy One Night in Vegas (2013) directed by John Ikem Uche and starring Jimmy Jean Louis, Sarodj Bertin, and Michael Blackson earned her a lot of attention for her portrayal of Van Vicker's wife, Mildred, a cancer patient trying to secure guardianship for her children before her death.

Other film roles include Yurika in Frank Rajah's Refugees (2013) starring Yvonne Nelson, Kwuni in Unconditional Love (2013) with John Dumelo, and Patience in the short film The Successor of Katunga (2013).

In addition to acting, Fon Dufe is also known for being the brainchild behind the Yefon trilogy. The trilogy, set in 1940 West Africa, portrays a young African village girl who goes against the discriminatory laws of her tribe, which subjugate women, and becomes the spark for a literary revolution.

The debut novel Yefon: The Red Necklace (2014) is set to travel to the silver screen in the future, and Sahndra herself will step into the lead role. Other cast members include: Isaiah Washington, Adriana Barazza, Jimmy Jean Louis, Hakeem Kae-Kazim, Leleti Khumalo, Uti Nwachukwu and many others with a soundtrack by Kelly Price.

In 2012, she partnered with the United States Embassy in Yaoundé, Cameroon, to organise training for young actors through a jointly owned International Workshop called Know Your Craft International. Sahndra also actively supports young female entertainers through an annual scholarship program in Our Lady of Lourdes College Mankon, Cameroon. She is also a voice for Project New Bamenda, a project launched to support young Cameroonian entrepreneurs from the North West Region of Cameroon.

== Early life ==
Fon Dufe was born on 28 October 1989, in Bamenda, Cameroon, to Dr. Ya Lydia Fondufe and Colonel Gilbert Fondufe, a military judge in Cameroon. Along with Sahndra, her brothers, Serge F Fondufe (b. 1987), Glenn V Fondufe (b. 1991), foster brother Nsame Gideon Ngo (1978– 2013) (b. 1978) and cousin Vanessa Sakah (b. 1994) were raised in Cameroon as Catholic Christians. They lived in several Cameroonian cities including Douala, Buea, Garoua, Bafoussam, and Yaoundé. Her parents currently live in Yaoundé.

Prior to acting, Fon Dufe attended PNEU School in Bamenda, Cameroon. She graduated from Lourdes College, and received a law degree from the University of Buea. She eventually became a sorority president (LESA, Buea) and a professional dancer for a Francophone Dance Group called Black LM in Cameroon. After graduating from law school, she persuaded her parents to let her travel to Los Angeles to attend the New York Film Academy.

== Career ==
=== Filming ===
==== 2009–2012: Early work ====
Fon Dufe started her professional acting career in local Cameroonian movies while she was studying law at the University of Buea in Cameroon. Without her parents' knowledge, she starred in two local movies as a supporting character. The first movie she appeared in was the Gold Age Productions feature movie Standing The Rain, starring Desmond Whyte and Proxy Buh Melvin. The movie was directed by Enah Johnscott and distributed locally in 2009.

Even though this film didn't make it internationally, US-based film producer and owner of AkwaStar Studios, Mako Namme, eventually noticed her. Namme offered Fon Dufe a supporting role in the movie Two Princes starring Kelly Azia, Collins Isuma, and Awa Edna.

This movie also never made it out of Cameroon, but the young actress' personality was noticed by prolific producers like Agbor Gilbert and director Reginald Ebere from neighbouring Nigeria, home to the world's second largest film industry: Nollywood.

In December 2010, barely a week after her graduation from law school, Fon Dufe left for the United States. She started training as an actor at the New York Film Academy in Los Angeles in 2011

The year was barely over when Sahndra booked the role of Zena in Kelechi Eke's Lost in Abroad, a Nigerian movie about confused African immigrants which was filmed in Texas, US. That same year, she appeared on a Dove Body Wash Times Square billboard, and modelled for the Los Angeles Fashion Minga.

The following year, she shot an inspirational International PSA in French and English which was directed by the award-winning female Chinese director Xandria Anyaene who was also the director of IJE, the highest-grossing film in Nigeria in 2012. Sahndra's performance got a lot of attention, and she was featured in Kanye West and Jay Z's music video N*ggaz in Paris.

When Fon Dufe graduated from NYFA, her parents flew all the way from Cameroon to watch her play Edie from The American Clock as her final showcase. It was at that moment that her parents accepted her passion and let go of their reservations about their daughter pursuing an acting career. It was around this period that Fon Dufe began dabbling with writing her first feature screenplay. The screenplay began as being something inspirational for women and blew up into a huge film project with big players like Hakeem Kae-Kazim, Isaiah Washington, Leleti Khumalo, Uti Nwachukwu, and Kelly Price. What began as the inspirational story The Face of God became Yefon, and this movement inspired many people all over the world.

In 2012, Fon Dufe was endorsed by Jireh Lip Products in Dubai and rated by Cam movies as No. 17 on the list of Top 20 Cameroonian producers and among the list of top 50 Cameroonians to watch out for in 2013. She hosted the Cameroonian students' annual US convention in Texas and performed both on stage and in numerous student short films, including a web series called Bibi The Witch which made her eligible to join The Screen Actors Guild of America. (SAG).

==== 2013: Breakthrough ====
Fon Dufe began the year 2013 by booking a national commercial for the American Cancer Society alongside Body of Proof actress Jeri Ryan. Soon after, Ghanaian producer Koby Maxwell hired her for One Night in Vegas starring Jimmy Jean Louis, Sarodj Bertin, Yvonne Nelson, John Dumelo, Van Vicker, and Michael Blackson. Fon Dufe portrayed Mildred, a cancer patient giving up the guardianship of her kids just before her death to her husband, played by Ghanaian celebrity Van Vicker. The movie was nominated nine times at the 2013 African Oscars and won five awards, including best picture. The movie was highly acclaimed by many critics. Awal Aziz, a film editor from Washington DC said: Wow... Sahndra FON DUFE, your performance was outstanding.... You nailed your role! Your facial expression and your eyes are becoming your signature, use it to your advantage. Van Vicker, you brought it home last night. I'm not your biggest fan but________ a standing ovation for you and Sahndra :-) I hope u guys win an award tonight. Good luck…. ~Awal Aziz/ Film Editor, Washington DC.

Fon Dufe's next film was opposite African celebrity John Dumelo. This time, it was the lead role of Kwuni in the movie Unconditional Love, a screenplay Fon Dufe co-wrote. While the movie was in post-production, Sahndra took on another role which is the biggest in her career so far. The Ghollywood (Ghana) James Cameron, Frank Rajah Arase, booked Fon Dufe in his blockbuster movie Refugees which is set for release in 2014. This time, co-starring with Yvonne Nelson, Fon Dufe played the role of Yurika, an African singer in a band fighting to make it amidst issues like race and their illegal immigration status.

== Philanthropy ==
In 2012, Fon Dufe partnered with the American Embassy in Yaoundé, Cameroon, to organise training for young actors through a jointly owned International Workshop. Sahndra also actively supports young female entertainers through an annual scholarship program in Lourdes College, Cameroon. She is also a voice for Project New Bamenda, a project launched to support young entrepreneurs from the North West Region of Cameroon.

== Awards ==
Fon Dufe won several awards including a recognition by the Commonwealth of Nations for her poem “Dear mama”.

== Filmography ==
Year	Title	Role	Notes
2013	Unconditional Love	Kwuni	Princess Manka Productions
2013	Yefon Promo	Yefon	African Pictures Int'l
2012	Black November	Arguing villager	Wells & Jeta Entertainment
2009	Standing the Rain	Cynthia	Gold Age Productions
2012	Lost in Abroad	Zena	Big Obi Productions
2010	Two Princes	Angel	Akwasta Productions
2012	Bad Accent	Summer	Paradigm Pictures
2013	One Night in Vegas	Mildred	Kobe Maxwell Productions
2013	Standing Tall	Zarina	NYFA Thesis Film
2013	Tarmun Promo	Tika	Paradigm productions
2013	The Successor of Katunga	Patience	Jay Mo productions
2014	Refugees	Eurika	Raj Heroes productions
2015	Rejected	Mirabel	Foday Conteh Films
2017	The Forgiven	Mother Mavis	Erickson Waters Productions
