= One Night in Vegas =

2013 comedy drama film by John Uche

- Directed by: John Uche
- Written by: B.J. Winfrey
- Produced by: Koby Maxwell
- Starring: Jimmy Jean-Louis; John Dumelo; Yvonne Nelson; Sarodj Bertin; Van Vicker; Michael Blackson
- Cinematography: Black Magic Tim
- Edited by: Black Magic Tim
- Music by: Koby Maxwell; Bruce Gardner; Blaise Tangelo; H. Gil Ingles
- Production companies: K.M Productions; RVI Motion Media
- Release date: December 25, 2013
- Running time: 133 minutes
- Countries: Nigeria; United States
- Language: English

One Night in Vegas is a 2013 Nigerian comedy drama film directed by John Uche. It stars Jimmy Jean-Louis, John Dumelo, Yvonne Nelson, Sarodj Bertin, Van Vicker, Michael Blackson and Koby Maxwell. The film focuses on a Ghanaian couple who attempt to better their relationship by taking a trip to Las Vegas. The film was created by the same team that produced Paparazzi: Eye in the Dark in 2011. Produced on a low six-figure budget and filmed over the course of 19 days, the film has been noted in the Nollywood USA market as poised to raise the bar of African films by utilizing a more western approach to production quality and standards. It notably employed the experience of an American filmmaker (Tim "Black Magic Tim" Wilson) who served as cinematographer and editor. The film's official release in Ghana had one of the largest turnouts in the history of Silverbird Theater at Accra Mall.

The film has been screened at the United Nations in New York City, the Library of Congress in Washington D.C., the Pan African Film Festival, Dublin Ireland, Haiti, Nigeria (on July 18, 2014), Maryland, Virginia, California, the United Kingdom, South Africa, and Sierra Leone.

This film was written by Hollywood screenwriter and actor B.J. Winfrey, an Atlanta, Georgia native, whose credits include Army Wives, Sabotage (with Arnold Schwarzenegger), and Tyler Perry's The Haves and the Have Nots, and who in 2014 became the first American to win the Nigerian and African Film Critics Award (NAFCA) for the short film Five.

== Plot ==
James Foster is a man at a crossroads with himself and his marriage. Coming out on top after a high-profile case with a band of thugs, James has been sober for 18 months. He decides that to take a trip to Vegas with his wife Genie would be a good way to rekindle their relationship as well as an opportunity to employ his bodyguard friend, Nick, a few more days as a holiday "thank you" for their security in the case.

Genie's mom, Barbara, is skeptical whether or not the trip will help Genie strengthen her relationship with James or resolve the intimate issues between them. Sometimes weakness is the opposite of strength, but sometimes weakness can be the pathway to strength. Sometimes addiction is the opposite of sobriety, but sometimes addiction can be the pathway to sobriety. Sometimes what happens in Vegas stays in Vegas, but sometimes it doesn't.

== Cast ==
- Jimmy Jean-Louis as Nick
- John Dumelo as James Foster
- Yvonne Nelson as Genie Foster
- Sarodj Bertin as Ashely Johnson
- Michael Blackson as Mr. Roland
- Van Vicker as Tony
- Koby Maxwell as Pat
- Sahndra Fon Dufe as Mildred
- Fatima M Cisse as Gladys
- Sinota Odu as Mrs. Roland
- Moses Efret as Therapist
- Claudio Oben as Vincent
- Princess Manka as Barbara
- Joy Kingsley-Ibeh as Nurse
- Cintia Diamond as Ashely's friend
- Rasheed Shobayo as Doctor 1
- Sheri Holder as Doctor 2

== Accolades ==
=== Nominations ===
- 2013 NAFC Awards: Best Film in the Diaspora
- 2013 NAFC Awards: Best Film
- 2013 NAFC Awards: Best Sound
- 2013 NAFC Awards: Best Director in the Diaspora
- 2013 NAFC Awards: Best Cinematography in the Diaspora
- 2013 NAFC Awards: Best Cinematography
- 2013 NAFC Awards: Best Actor in a Supporting Role
- 2013 NAFC Awards: Best Screenplay
- 2013 NAFC Awards: Best Screenplay in the Diaspora
- 2013 NAFC Awards: Best Editing
- 2013 NAFC Awards: Best Actor in a Leading Role
- 2013 NAFC Awards: Best Actress in a Leading Role
- 2013 NAFC Awards: Best Visual Effects
- 2013 Ghana Movie Awards: Best Editing/Sound
- 2013 Ghana Movie Awards: Best Music
- 2013 Ghana Movie Awards: Best Performance by an Actor in a Supporting Role
- 2013 Ghana Movie Awards: Best Picture

=== Awards ===
- 2013 NAFCA: Best Cinematography
- 2013 NAFCA: Best Film in Diaspora
- 2013 NAFCA: Best Actor in a Supporting Role

== See also ==
- List of Nigerian films of 2013
