= Syr Law =

American actress

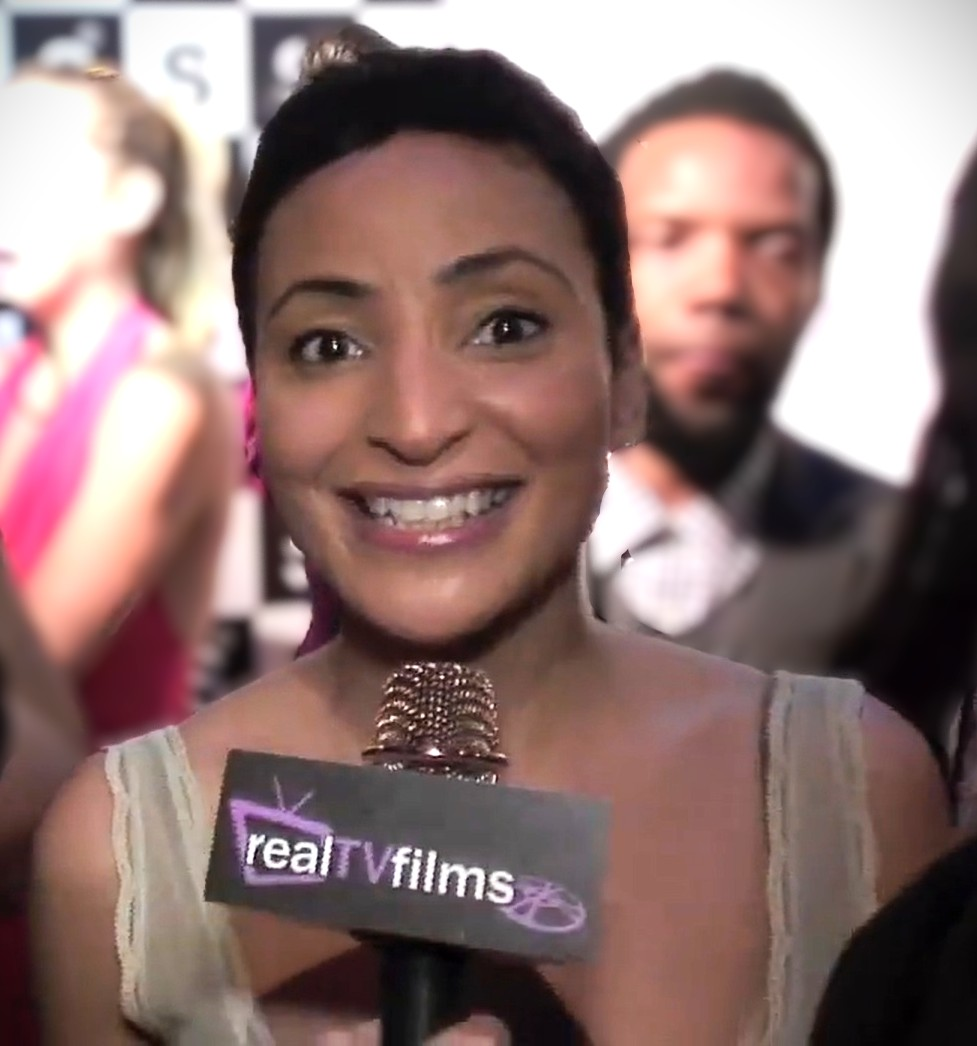
- Law in 2011
- Born: Crystal Dionne Porter; Atlanta Georgia
- Occupation: Actor
- Years active: 2000 - Present
- Website: www.nowcasting.com/syrlaw

Crystal Dionne Porter, professionally known as Syr (pronounced S-e-e-r) Law is an American actress. She has performed in leading roles in a variety of films ranging from romantic comedies and dramas to science fiction. She received a WMIFF nomination and a win at the Nollywood Film Critics Award (NAFCA) for her performance in "Paparazzi: Eye in the Dark". This same film opened the door to other American actors, as she was the first African-American Actress to successfully cross over into all African genres and win several awards and nominations worldwide.

== Family and early life ==
Law was born Crystal Dionne Porter to Albert Wesley Porter and Miriam Gibson Porter. Law's father, retired from the City of Miami, was born in Tallahassee, Florida, to Willie Pearle Porter, the first AA to serve as an instructor at Mt. Sinai Hospital and Gilbert L. Porter, an educator in the State of Florida. Law grew up in Atlanta, Georgia, where she attended The Lovett School for Primary Education. Sutton Middle and North Atlanta High School for International Studies served for her secondary studies. Law's mother and father gave her an Episcopal upbringing. Regarding religion, she now calls herself spiritual. She attended Hampton University in Hampton, VA where she received a BA in English. Post-college, Law discovered her love for acting. The Actor's Express Black Playwright's Festival led to an invitation into the theater's exclusive intern program and offered her a chance to act professionally.

== Career ==
Law made her film debut, credited under her birth name Crystal Porter, as a freshman in Pay The Price (2000). She followed playing the role of a good-hearted masseur opposite Billy Dee Williams in Good Neighbor (2001), a sassy check-out girl in Big Ain't Bad (2002) and a politically roused intern in Bottom (2004). Appearing in four films in 2005, Law appeared in her first studio film for Lionsgate Films, Tyler Perry's Diary of a Mad Black Woman directed by Darren Grant. That year, Law starred in Camp DOA as college student on a road trip gone wrong; the critically acclaimed sci-fi indie, Dark Remains; and Somebodies was recognized at Sundance Film Festival and developed into a spin-off for BET as the network's first scripted series. Joining the Screen Actors Guild in 2007, Law found her birth name was in use. She used the first four letters of her first name, reversed their order, dropping the later letter. Hence, Syr found her own Law. The film Touching (2007) is Law's first credit under her current professional name. Election (2008) saw Law playing an ambitious college student. The critically acclaimed film What To Bring To America (2010) introduced Law as an international powerhouse. Law worked with Allen Wolf in 2010 on the sleeper, In My Sleep and the international market opened for Law in 2011 in her celebrated performance as Pearl Wisdoms in Paparazzi: Eye in the Dark. In 2012, Law made her television debut as Becky on NBC's Days of Our Lives.

She has also acted on stage in 2007 in A Lesson Before Dying, based on Ernest J. Gaines' novel, at the Actors' Group Theater, Hollywood, playing Vivian, the girlfriend of the lead character Jefferson, a black man who is wrongly sentenced to death for the murder of a white man.

== Filmography ==
Year	Film	Role	Notes
2012	Days of Our Lives	Becky	Actress
2012	The Entrapped		Actress
2011	Paparazzi Eye In The Dark	Pearl Wisdoms	Actress Co-Starring with Van Vicker, Tchidi Chikeri, Koby Maxwell, Chet Anekwe
2010	In My Sleep	Babysitter	Actress
2010	What To Bring To America	Lily	Actress
2008	Election	Female Student	Actress
2007	Touching	Karen	Actress
2006	Somebodies	Taylor	Actress
2005	Dark Remains	Gail	Actress
2005	Diary of a Mad Black Woman	Woman	Actress

=== Awards ===
- WMIFF 2011 Award Nomination - Best Actress In A Lead Role "Paparazzi: Eye in the Dark"
- NAFCA 2011 Award – Best Actress In A Lead Role Diaspora Film "Paparazzi: Eye in the Dark"
- NAFCA 2012 AWARD - Best Actress In A Lead Role In Diaspora "The Entrapped"
