= Tim Wilson (filmmaker) =

American filmmaker

- Born: Timothy Malcom Wilson; Washington, D.C.
- Other names: Black Magic
- Occupation(s): director, cinematographer, editor, visual effects artist, filmmaker
- Years active: 1990–present
- Website: www.BlackMagicTim.com

Black Magic Tim (born Timothy Malcom Wilson) is an American filmmaker working mostly with music videos, EPK's, commercials and independent feature films. He has directed, filmed and edited productions for clients such as Blackground Records, Tommy Boy Entertainment and TVT Records. As well as, EPK's for national artists and book authors like " Naughty by Nature "," Tank (American singer) ", "Kimberly Scott (singer)" and Motivational Speaker "Valorie Burton". He has received several awards and film festival nominations for his work on the short Sci-Fi film "Apple Crumb Panic".

He is also known for reshaping the quality of Nollywood USA Films. His most notable Nollywood film Paparazzi: Eye in the Dark made a historical theatrical run in the United States where He served as cinematographer and editor. Wilson considers Nollywood to be the new black Hollywood. In 2013, the award-winning Nollywood feature, One Night in Vegas has also been poised as the next bar raising film in which again, he was cinematographer and editor. As of 2014, the Nollywood film Busted Life was just released where again Wilson was Cinematographer.

He attended Howard University film school studying under Haile Gerima before starting his first film company in Washington, D.C., with 3 other Howard University graduates named "Black Magic Cinemaworks". He is skilled in 35mm, 16mm and HD Cinematography and is a visual digital effects technician.

He is now owner of a film production company named Cyberstorm Digital in Washington DC.

== Filmography ==
| Year | Film | Type | Notes | Format |
|---|---|---|---|---|
| 1993 | Apple Crumb Panic | Short Festival Film | Co-Director, editor, Visual Effects, producer | 16mm |
| 1997 | Third Meridian | Short Film | Co-Prod, Visual Effects, Set Design | 16mm |
| 2001 | Adventures of Dennis Da Menace: South Beach | Documentary | Director, editor, Cinematographer | SD video |
| 2002 | Guilty By Association | Feature Film | Production Designer, Associate Producer | 35mm |
| 2003 | Paper Chasers | Documentary | Director of Photography 2nd Unit, Digital Artist | HD video |
| 2008 | The Hayes Way: Body Defining Age Defying | Sports Training DVD | Director, Videographer, Editor | HD video |
| 2008 | Karar Fitness | Fitness Training DVD | Director, Videographer, Editor | HD video |
| 2008 | The Lex Vector Chronicles | Short Sci Fi Film | Director, Cinematographer, editor, Visual Effects | HD video |
| 2010 | Busted Life | Feature Film | Cinematographer | HD video |
| 2011 | Paparazzi Eye in the Dark | Feature Film | Cinematographer, editor, 5.1 Sound Mixer, Exe. Prod. | HD video |
| 2013 | One Night in Vegas | Feature Film | Cinematographer, editor, 5.1 Sound Mixer | HD video |
| 2013 | Unconditional Love | Feature Film | Cinematographer | HD video |
| 2021 | Mischief Upon Mischief | Feature Film | Cinematographer | HD video |
| 2021 | Miss Alma Thomas: A Life in Color | Short Film | Cinematographer | HD video |

== Music videos ==
| Year | Title | Artist | Notes | Format |
|---|---|---|---|---|
| 1991 | Boogie Bound | Unbiased Ghetto Opinion | Director, editor, Cinematographer | 16mm |
| 1992 | How To Be A Crook | J-Gifted | 2nd Unit Camera | 16mm |
| 1992 | Feel This | U.G.O. | Director, Cinematographer, editor | 16mm |
| 1993 | N.D.G. | The Game and The Player | Co-Director, editor, Cinematographer | 16mm |
| 1994 | Unfadable | Earthquake | Props, Pyrotechnics | 16mm |
| 1994 | Release Me | Dark Gable | Director, editor, Cinematographer | 16mm |
| 1994 | Straight From The Heart | U.G.O. | Editor, Cinematographer | 16mm |
| 1994 | A Change Gonna Come | Al Mason | Editor, Cinematographer | 16mm |
| 1995 | Only Be One | Infinite Flavor | Cinematographer, editor | 16mm |
| 1996 | 5'oclock in the Morning | Nonchalant | Grip | 16mm |
| 1996 | Love Me For Free | Akinyele (rapper) | Cinematographer, editor | 35mm |
| 1996 | Lost and All Alone | Rugged | Director, Cinematographer, editor | 35mm |
| 1997 | Paradise | Basick Mentality | Director, Cinematographer, editor | 16mm |
| 2000 | Not Another Love Song | Krisis Feat Kimberly Scott (singer) | Co-Director, Cinematographer, editor | 16mm |
| 2001 | Get'em Psyched | Black Indian | Director, Cinematographer, editor | 16mm |
| 2001 | Another Sad Love Song | Substanz | Director, Cinematographer, editor | 16mm |
| 2001 | Buster | Dennis L.A. White | Director, Cinematographer, editor | SD video |
| 2001 | Rage I Got | Dennis L.A. White | Director, Cinematographer, editor | SD video |
| 2002 | Repercussions Starring Morgan Freeman | Section 8 Mob | Associate Producer, Production Design, Set Construction | 35mm |
| 2003 | Waiting | 4U | Director, Cinematographer, editor, Visual Effects | SD video |
| 2003 | Im Falling | Nyl | Director, Cinematographer, editor | SD video |
| 2003 | If I Should Die | K-Illa | Director, Cinematographer, editor, Visual Effects | SD video |
| 2004 | Party | Keith Holmes (boxer) | Director, Cinematographer, editor, Set Construction | HD video |
| 2004 | Whatchu Like | No Label | Director, Cinematographer, editor, Set Construction | HD video |
| 2007 | Im Aware | Koby Maxwell | Director, Cinematographer, editor, Set Construction | HD video |
| 2008 | Into The Future (Jap. Language) | Unicorn Table | Director, Cinematographer, editor, Visual Effects | HD video |
| 2008 | Abiba (Remix) | Koby Maxwell | Editor | HD video |
| 2009 | Heavens Door (Japanese Language)] | Unicorn Table | Director, Cinematographer, editor, Set Construction | HD video |
| 2010 | Do It | Koby Maxwell | Director, Cinematographer, editor | HD video |
| 2011 | Password | Koby Maxwell | Director, Cinematographer, editor, Visual Effects | HD video |
| 2012 | Trust in Me | Salia | Director, Cinematographer, editor, Visual Effects | HD video |
| 2012 | Love is Magic | Salia | Director, Cinematographer, editor, Visual Effects | HD video |
| 2014 | Hooty Hoo | Koby Maxwell | Director, Cinematographer, editor, Visual Effects | HD video |

== EPK's and commercials ==
| Year | Title | Featuring | Notes | Format |
|---|---|---|---|---|
| 1995 | The Terminator: Future Shock (In Store Promotional) | Bethesda Softworks | Editor | SD video |
| 1995 | PBA Bowling for Windows 95 | Bethesda Softworks | Editor | SD video |
| 2000 | Kimberly Scott (singer) EPK | Kimberly Scott (singer) | Director, editor, Cinematographer | SD video |
| 2000 | Tank (American singer) Album Release Live EPK | Tank (American singer) | Director, editor, Cinematographer | SD video |
| 2000 | Aura EPK | Aura | Director, Cinematographer, editor | SD video |
| 2000 | Adidas Marketing Promo Video | | Director, editor, Cinematographer | SD video |
| 2001 | Shawn Michelle Cosby]Choreographer/Actress/Singer EPK | Shawn Michelle Cosby | Director, editor, Cinematographer | SD video |
| 2001 | Johnny Doswell Album Release Commercial | Johnny Doswell | Director, editor, Cinematographer, Visual Effects | SD video |
| 2002 | Naughty by Nature IIcons Hip Hopumentary EPK | Treach, Vin Rock, Redman, Method Man, Pink, Carl Thomas, 3LW | Editor, Visual Digital Effects | SD video |
| 2002 | Midnight Marauders Commercial Campaign 1–5 | La La (entertainer), DJ Searcy, P-Stew, Poochman | Director, editor, Cinematographer, Visual Digital Effects | SD video |
| 2003 | Duane Stowes EPK | Duane Stowes | Director, editor, Cinematographer | SD video |
| 2003 | Universal Madness Clothing Commercial Campaign 1–6 | Steve Blake | Director, editor, Cinematographer, Visual Digital Effects | SD video |
| 2005 | Jumpshot Your Vote Feat. Kenny Anderson | Kenny Anderson | Editor, Visual Effects | 35mm |
| 2005 | Vote New Jersey Ad Campaign Feat. Jadakiss | Jadakiss | Editor, Visual Effects | 35mm |
| 2005 | Vote New Jersey Ad Campaign Feat. Naughty By Nature | Vin Rock | Editor, Visual Effects | 35mm |
| 2005 | Nefertiti Stage Play EPK | | Director, editor, Cinematographer | SD video |
| 2007 | 1st Step Financial Commercial | | Director, editor, Cinematographer, Visual Effects | HD video |
| 2007 | Valorie Burton EPK | Valorie Burton | Director, editor, Cinematographer | HD video |
| 2007 | Jason Parker EPK | Jason Parker | Director, editor, Cinematographer | HD video |
| 2007 | Excellence Christian Church Commercial | | Director, editor, Cinematographer, Visual Effects | HD video |
| 2008 | Double Portions Spirited Ministries | | Director, editor, Cinematographer, Visual Effects | HD video |
| 2008 | Sexy Singles Date Commercial | Suzanne Edgars | Director, editor, Cinematographer, Visual Effects | HD video |
| 2008 | DC Independent Film Festival | | Director, editor, Cinematographer, Visual Effects | HD video |
| 2008 | Anime FX Commercial | | Director, editor, Cinematographer, Visual Effects | HD video |
| 2009 | Unicorn Table Album Release Commercial (English Version) | Salia and Shingo | Director, editor, Cinematographer, Visual Effects | HD video |
| 2009 | We Are MSEA | | Editor, Cinematographer | HD video |
| 2013 | Coast Guard Traumatic Brain Injury TBI 101 DVD | | Editor, Cinematographer | HD video |

== Television ==
| Year | Title | Featuring | Notes | Format |
|---|---|---|---|---|
| 1995 | America's Most Wanted: Final Justice | | Grip | SD video |
| 2003 | Funtastic World of Black Magic Tim (Pilot) | | Director, Camera, editor, Broadcast Graphics | 16mm, SD video |
| 2004 | One Nation Hip-Hop Show (Pilot) | P-Stew | Director, editor, Camera, Broadcast Graphics | SD video |
| 2006 | Shotcallerz (Pilot) | | Director, editor, Cinematographer, Broadcast Graphics | HD video |
| 2011 | The Diaspora Report | | Broadcast Graphics Designer, Show Introduction | HD video |
| 2011 | B.E.T. Lift Every Voice (BET) | Corey Condrey | Broadcast Graphics Designer, Show Introduction | HD video |
| 2016 | Nollyhot TV (WJLA-TV/The WB) | Koby Maxwell | Director, editor, Camera, Broadcast Graphics | HD video |
| 2019 | The Superbowl That Wasn't (NFL Network) | Chuck D | Additional Cinematography | HD video |
| 2020 | 2nd Annual Urban One Honors (TV One (American TV channel)) | Chris Tucker | Camera Operator | HD video |
| 2021 | Joe Biden 2021 Presidential Inauguration Ceremony | Andra Day | Steadicam | HD video |
| 2021 | Ray McGuire for Mayor Ad | Spike Lee | Steadicam | HD video |
| 2021 | Club Life (CBS Sports) | Wendell Haskins | Steadicam, Color Correction | HD video |

=== Nominations ===
- 1993 RABC 9th Annual Film Festival: Best Short Film (Apple Crumb Panic)
- 2005 EMMY AWARD: Jump Shot Your Vote feat Kenny Anderson
- 2011 WMIFF: Best Cinematography in a Feature Film
- 2011 WMIFF: Best Cinematography in a Music Video
- 2011 NAFC Awards: Best Cinematography in the Diaspora
- 2011 GHANA MOVIE AWARDS: Best Sound Editing Paparazzi Eye In The Dark
- 2011 GHANA MOVIE AWARDS: Best Visual Effects Paparazzi Eye In The Dark
- 2012 GIAMA AWARDS: Best Film Paparazzi Eye In The Dark
- 2012 Indie Music Channel Awards: World Music Video over $5000
- 2013 NAFCA Awards: Best Sound "One Night in Vegas"
- 2013 NAFCA Awards: Best Editing "One Night in Vegas"
- 2013 NAFCA Awards: Best Cinematography in the Diaspora "One Night In Vegas"
- 2013 NAFCA Awards: Best Cinematography "One Night In Vegas"
- 2013 NAFCA Awards: Best Visual Effects "One Night In Vegas"
- 2013 GHANA MOVIE AWARDS: Best Editing and Sound One Night In Vegas

=== Awards ===
- 1993 ROSEBUD AWARDS: Honorable Mention for "Apple Crumb Panic"
- 2011 WMIFF AWARD: Best Cinematography for "Paparazzi Eye In The Dark"
- 2011 NAFCA: Best Cinematography in the Diaspora "Paparazzi Eye In The Dark"
- 2013 NAFCA: Best Cinematography "One Night In Vegas"
