= JJ Bunny =

Nigerian actress and recording artist

- Born: Joy Orie; Nigeria
- Occupations: Actress, recording artist, record producer, screenwriter
- Years active: 2009–14
- Website: www.jjbunny.com

JJ Bunny is a former Nollywood US actress residing in the United States. She is a recording artist and a filmmaker who acted in her first feature film entitled Caged in 2009. She has successfully trescend into the Nollywood and Gollywood film industry.

== Filmography ==
Year	Film	Role	Notes
2010	Caged	Joy	Co-starring with Michael Blackson, Desmond Elliott
2010	Governor's Gift	Vivian	Co-starring with Jim Iyke, Doctor Selby Tonto Dike Date: Doctor
2011	The Bet	Angel	Co-starring with Van Vicker
2011	Paparazzi Eye in the Dark	Jackie	Co-starring Van Vicker, Koby Maxwell, Syr Law, Chet Anekwe, Tchidi Chikere, Bayo Akinfemi
2011	The Other Side of Love	Stella	Co-starring with Pascal Atuma, Ramsey Nouah
2011	Okoto the Messenger'	Angelina	Co-starring with Pascal Atuma
2011	This Is Houston	Nicole	Co-starring with Pascal Atuma, Ini edo
2011	Husband's Desire	Angel	
2011	A Woman's Mind	Baby	
2011	Royal Dilemma	Vicki	
2012	Love Assassine	Shelly	
2012	Mad Devotion	Kennedy	
2012	Love and Crime	Kim	

=== Awards ===
Year	Title	Role
2010	2010 Nigeria Fashion and Beauty Award 2010	
2011	2011 Nollywood USA Achievement Award 2011	
