= Koby Maxwell =

Ghanaian record producer

- Born: Maxwell Koby Okwensy; 5 November 1978 (age 47); Ghana
- Occupations: Recording artist, producer, actor, singer
- Years active: 2001–present
- Website: kobymaxwellproductions.com

Koby Maxwell (born 25 November 1978, as Maxwell Koby Okwensy) is a Ghanaian musician, singer, actor and producer who currently resides in Washington, D.C., in the United States. He says that his goal is to maintain the authenticity of African music, while incorporating the sounds of others. In June 2010, he became a film producer and executive producer when he hired a US film production company to produce his first Nollywood feature film, entitled Paparazzi Eye in the Dark.

In 2016, he started producing a show on the North American TV channel ABC2 called Nollyhot TV which was first aired on 6 January that year. The show captures happenings within the Nigerian entertainment industry of Nollywood for an American audience. Nollyhot TV is also broadcast on the DCW 50 and The CW television channels in the USA. Koby Maxwell Productions in association with Lafa Media & Zealmatic Pictures also came out with a 2019 movie titled The Wrong One.

== Family and early life ==
Koby Maxwell is the oldest of six children. Since arriving in America in 2000, he has performed in prominent places such as the Kennedy Center and the Radio City Music Hall in New York City. He has shared the stage with artists including Nancy Wilson, Chaka Khan and Dionne Warwick. In August 2006, he performed with reggae star Sean Paul, Barrington Levy, Sanchez, Ziggy and Stephen Marley, Bunny Wailer and Salif Keita at Reggae on the River. Maxwell also gained additional recognition as a key performer in Detroit's 21st African World Festival.

== Discography ==
Year	Album	Role	Notes
2004	Praise The Lord	Artist	
2005	Flying with the Lord	Artist	
2007	I'm Aware	Artist	
2007	Step to the Top	Artist	with Veeda, DJ Tasouman
2008	Hope Alive Movie Soundtrack	Artist	Starring Desmond Elliot
2010	Busted Life Movie Soundtrack	Artist	Starring Ramsey Nouah
2011	Paparazzi Eye in the Dark Movie Soundtrack	Artist	Starring Van Vicker, Tchidi Chikeri, Syr Law, Chet Anekwe
2011	Do It Album	Artist	

== Filmography ==
Year	Film	Role	Notes
2011	Paparazzi Eye in the Dark	Mr. Maxx	Producer, actor co-Starring with Van Vicker, Tchidi Chikeri, Syr Law, Chet Anekwe
2012	Drug Related 3	Reporter / Detective	Alongside Saint Anger, Holly Anderson, Tammy Barboa
2013	One Night in Vegas	Pat	Producer, actor co-Starring with Jimmy Jean-Louis, John Dumelo, Michael Blackson, Sarodj Bertin
2018	Busted Life	Mr. Max	Alongside Ron Bush, Chet Anekwe, Pascal Atuma

=== Awards ===
- 2009 Award of Excellence & Outstanding Performer: Next Vision Entertainment
- 2010 Humanitarian Award: Doctors for the Village
- 2010 USA Excellence in African Music: 3G Media
- 2011 Producer Achievement Award: Nollywood USA
- 2013 Best Film in Diaspora NAFCA 2013
- 2013 Favorite Male Artist Nafca 2013
- 2014 Outstanding Entertainer at DD Records
- 2014 DMV African movie producer of the year
- 2015 Caribbean Movie Festival, for achievement in the film industry
