= List of screenwriters =

This is a list of screenwriters, diffused by country.

== Albania ==
- Fatmir Gjata (1922–1989)
- Llazar Siliqi (1924–2001)
- Vath Koreshi (1936–2006)
- Anastas Kondo (1937–2006)
- Nexhati Tafa (born 1952)
- Elvira Dones (born 1960)
- Nijazi Ramadani (born 1964)

== Nigeria ==
- Funsho Adeolu
- Kemi Adesoye
- Eric Aghimien
- Jeffrey Musa
- Niji Akanni
- Abdulkareem Baba Aminu
- Chika Anadu
- Nnamani Grace Odi
- Chet Anekwe
- Pascal Atuma
- Ishaya Bako
- Toluwani Obayan
- Ola Balogun
- Biyi Bandele
- Nicole Asinugo
- Philip Begho
- Genevieve Nnaji
- JJ Bunny
- Jude Idada
- Lancelot Oduwa Imasuen
- Emem Isong
- Akin Lewis
- Charles Novia
- Femi Odugbemi
- Kingsley Ogoro
- Stephanie Okereke Linus
- Kehinde Olorunyomi
- Tade Ogidan

== See also ==
- Lists of writers
