= Tchidi Chikere =

Nigerian movie director, producer, scriptwriter, actor and singer

- Born: 10 October 1975 (age 50)
- Education: English Language, University of Calabar
- Alma mater: University of Calabar
- Occupations: Actor, producer, director
- Spouse: Nuella Njubigbo
- Children: 3
- Awards: Africa Magic Viewers award, 2012 Golden Icons Academy Movie Awards

Tchidi Chikere (born 10 October 1975) is a Nigerian film director, producer, scriptwriter, actor, music video director and singer. He has over 100 films and two music albums to his credit.

== Background and early life ==
Chikere is from Amuzi, Ahiazu Mbaise in Imo State. He is the youngest child of his parents. He studied English language at the University of Calabar. There, he began writing movie scripts and was also part of a three-man music group. On completion of his National Youth Service, he travelled to the UK, and published his first book there. Chikere went fully into the film industry after graduating from the university.

== Personal life ==
Chikere has three sons with his first wife, actress Sophia Tchidi Chikere. The marriage ended in 2012.

He later married actress Nuella Njubigbo. The traditional wedding ceremony took place on 29 March 2014 in his wife's hometown in Anambra State, and the white wedding was held at the Catholic Church of Transfiguration, VGC, Lagos State, on 9 June 2018. He has a daughter with Nuella. In 2021, speculations arose that the couple had separated. As of April 2023, Chikere announced that he had remarried.

== Filmography ==
=== As actor ===
Year	Film	Role	Notes
1999	Ijele	Azunna	with Romanus Amuta
2003	Throwing Stones		with Rita Dominic
2007	African Soldier	Prince Udoka	with Ignatius Abara, Stan K. Amandi
2011	Paparazzi: Eye in the Dark	Jimmy	with Van Vicker, Chet Anekwe and JJ Bunny
2012	When Heaven Smiles		with Van Vicker (directed by Chikere and George Kalu)
2016	Slave Dancer		with Princess Brun Njua
2017	Pains of Life		
2018	Love and Shadow	Ichie Ogadi	
2019	The Posh Girl	Ichie Amadi	
2020	Strange Sisters	Nwake	
2021	Our Jesus Story		
2022	Unloved	Izuu	
2022	African Gods	Okwadike	with Adaobi Bestman, Adaeze Chiegbu
2023	The Dead	Native Doctor	with Arinze Bob
2023	A Good Woman	Ibe	

=== As producer/director ===
Year	Film	Notes
2003	Blood Sisters	starring Oge Okoye, Genevieve Nnaji, Omotola Jalade Ekeinde
2008	Stronger Than Pain	starring Nkem Owoh, Kate Henshaw
2011	Gold Not Silver	starring Ken Erics
2012	Paint My Life/Tempest	starring Daniel K Daniel
2013	Dumebi	starring Mercy Johnson
2017	Professor Johnbull	starring Daniel K Daniel (TV series)
2018	The Pink Room	hosts are Nuella Njubigbo, Uriel Oputa, Anita Joseph, Bidemi Kosoko, Nichole Banna, Ese Eriate and Vida Modelo (talkshow)

== Music ==
In 2007, Chikere launched his first music album, Slaps n Kisses.It was produced by OJB Jezreel and Marvelous Benji, and featured Rita Dominic, Pat Attah, Marvelous Benji, Jimmy B and OJB Jezreel. His second album was released in the UK.

He directed the video for Kcee's song "Agbomma".

== Discography ==
- Show Me Heaven
- Love Injection
- Again and Again
- Club Zone
- Open Streets
- Obelomo

== Awards and nominations ==
Chikere has won awards for his directing including the Africa Magic Viewers' Choice Awards. At the Africa Movie Academy Awards in 2008 he won Best Comedy for Stronger Than Pain, and his film Beautiful Soul was nominated for Best Screenplay. He was nominated twice at the 2012 Golden Icons Academy Movie Awards, for Best Actor – Diaspora for his role in When Heaven Smiles and for Best Male Act – Diaspora (Viewer’s Choice). He was also nominated for the Best Original Screenplay at the 2013 Nollywood Movies Awards for directing/producing Dumebi.

== See also ==
- List of Nigerian actors
- List of Nigerian film producers
- List of Nigerian film directors
