= Paparazzi: Eye in the Dark =

- Directed by: Bayo Akinfemi
- Written by: Kojo Edu Ansah
- Produced by: Clarice Kulah; Koby Maxwell
- Starring: Van Vicker; Syr Law; Koby Maxwell; Tchidi Chikere; Chet Anekwe; JJ Bunny; Bayo Akinfemi
- Cinematography: Black Magic Tim
- Edited by: Black Magic Tim
- Music by: Koby Maxwell; Blaise Tangelo; Paul G Irina
- Production companies: G.M.P. RVI Motion Media
- Distributed by: Great Moments Productions
- Release date: February 12, 2011
- Running time: 144 minutes
- Country: Nigeria
- Language: English

Paparazzi: Eye in the Dark is a 2011 romantic mystery film directed by Bayo Akinfemi and starring Van Vicker, Koby Maxwell, Tchidi Chikere, Syr Law, JJ Bunny and Chet Anekwe. The film depicts the adventures of an aspiring photographer whose accidental picture exposes an infamous murder mystery. The film was initially slated for a direct-to-video release but as of February, 2011 was scheduled for a multiple-city limited theatrical release. Made for a low six-figure budget and filmed over the course of 19 days, the film has been known in the Nollywood USA market as the film that has changed the look and sound of Nollywood by introducing a more western approach to production quality. Notably the filmmakers employed the experience of an American filmmaker (Tim "Black Magic Tim" Wilson) to serve as cinematographer and editor.

== Plot ==
Aspiring photographer Rich Amarah dreams of making his fortune through his art but finds the life of being a paparazzi spy more lucrative. By selling pictures to the national newspapers, he has the opportunity to rub shoulders with the rich and famous. Superstar Ghanaian recording artist Mr. Maxx is at the top of the paparazzi food chain, and Rich's appetite for success leads him into a whirlwind of chaos when he accidentally films the "scoop of the century". This event not only becomes the paper's biggest exclusive but threatens his very survival as he alone holds the images to the city's biggest murder mystery.

== Cast ==
- Van Vicker as Rich Amarah
- Koby Maxwell as Mr. Maxx
- Tchidi Chikere as Jimmy
- Syr Law as Pearl Wisdoms
- Chet Anekwe as Det. Davis
- Bayo Akinfemi as Pat
- JJ Bunny as Jackie
- Princess Pursia as Donna
- Cynthia Masasi as Tiffiany
- Rosaline Sesay as Tess
- B.J. Winfrey as Charles Livingston
- Reprudencia Sonkey as Rose Fire
- Claudia Kastellanos as Extra

== Production ==
=== Music ===
The soundtrack contains numerous tracks from artists of Nigeria, Ghana and the United States. Koby Maxwell introduces his song "Do It" as well as "Facebook Girl". Paul G has several tracks as well which include "Let It Flow" and "These Girls". Paul G has notably released a music video with recording artist Akon; called "Bang It All". New artist Irina also debuts her tracks "So Free" and "Cega".

=== Nominations ===
- 2011 WMIFF: Best Cinematography in a Feature Film
- 2011 WMIFF: Best Cinematography DMV
- 2011 WMIFF: Best Screenplay in a Feature Film
- 2011 WMIFF: Best Original Sound
- 2011 WMIFF: Best Actor in a Feature Film
- 2011 WMIFF: Best Actress in a Feature Film
- 2011 NAFC Awards: Best Film in the Diaspora
- 2011 NAFC Awards: Best Film
- 2011 NAFC Awards: Best Soundtrack
- 2011 NAFC Awards: Best Drama in the Diaspora
- 2011 NAFC Awards: Best Director in the Diaspora
- 2011 NAFC Awards: Best Actress in a Leading Role
- 2011 NAFC Awards: Best Actor in a Supporting Role
- 2011 GHANA MOVIE Awards: Best Visual Effects
- 2011 GHANA MOVIE Awards: Best Sound Editing and Mixing
- 2011 GHANA MOVIE Awards: Best Original Music
- 2012 Pan African Film Festival: Official Selection
- 2012 AFRICAN MOVIE Academy Awards: Best Film By An African Living Aboard

=== Awards ===
- 2011 WMIFF: Best Cinematography
- 2011 NAFCA: Best Film in the Diaspora
- 2011 NAFCA: Best Director in the Diaspora
- 2011 NAFCA: Best Cinematography in the Diaspora
- 2011 NAFCA: Best Actress in Leading Role
- 2011 NAFCA: Best Actor in a Supporting Role
