= Mummy's Daughter =

- Directed by: Frank Rajah Arase
- Produced by: Abdul Salam Mumuni
- Starring: Kofi Adjorlolo; Van Vicker; Nadia Buari; Kalsoume Sinare; Ecow Smith-Asante; Austine Erowele
- Cinematography: Tunde Adekoya
- Edited by: Afra Marley
- Music by: Austine Erowele
- Release date: 2006
- Country: Ghana

Mummy's Daughter: Set Apart is a two-part 2006 drama film, directed by Frank Rajah Arase. Produced by Abdul Salam Mumuni of Venus Films, it was likely filmed in Accra, Ghana.

The film marks the debut movie appearance of Ghanaian actress Nadia Buari, prior to her leading role in Beyonce: The President's Daughter, the latter of which has been called Buari's "big break". Her appearance as Beyonce would incite Buari to move to Nollywood films two years later.

Supporting actress Jackie Appiah called Princess one of her favorite roles in film. In an unknown interview, Appiah stated she "loved how [she] acted" in the film and "was happy with the role [she] played".

== Summary ==
=== First film ===
Gladys reprimands her daughter Anita for coming home late from the library.

While at the store, Gladys is approached by the owner of the department store, who expresses his admiration for her industrious nature and asks her to join him for a candlelit dinner. There, the owner reveals that he has feelings for Gladys, who reminds him of his late wife.

Gladys buys Princess a yellow Mini Cooper as a surprise gift, without any special occasion. Meanwhile, she largely ignores her other daughter's birthday; when Anita informs her which day it is, her mother says, "Happy birthday. Where's Princess?".

In an attempt to please her mother, Anita finds work, which is coincidentally the department store business's corporate office. There, she meets Fred, the son of the CEO, who is working undercover as a driver to spy on the business, which is in dire straits. After saving money, Anita surprises her mother by gifting her a necklace, earning a hug from her.

After a chance meeting outside, Alex (Asante) and Anita recognize each other as childhood friends from the same village, and are happy to reconnect with Princess as well, despite Gladys's disapproval. He lavishes her with presents including a new dress and jewelry, and organizes a surprise birthday party. When Alex's wife later hears about the time and money he spent on Anita behind her back, she is furious and considers his behavior deceitful.

During work, Fred overhears two business associates plotting a complex tax evasion scheme involving Swiss banking and insurance fraud. After his father's resignation as CEO, Fred assumes his father's position, claiming he will rescue the company and lead it into a brighter future. Soon afterward, Fred and Anita pursue a romance, enjoying a romantic day at the zoo, on a boat, taking photographs together, and picnicking. Meanwhile, unaware of Anita's romance with Fred, Anita's mother plots for Fred and Princess to marry. Fred delivers jewelry gifts for Anita to the house without a label; her mother assumes the gift is for Princess, who is thrilled to receive them, while Anita is confused and upset.

== Cast ==
- Nadia Buari as Anita, the protagonist
- Jackie Appiah as Princess, the protagonist's friendly and devoted sister, and the favorite child
- Kalsoume Sinare as Gladys, the protagonist's strict mother, who shows affection for Princess but often acts coldly towards Anita
- Kofi Adjorlolo as Fred's father, a wealthy storeowner/CEO and widower, who expresses romantic interest in Gladys
- Van Vicker as Fred, the CEO's son, who later takes over the company, and is in a love triangle with Anita and Princess
- Ecow-Smith Asante as Alex (formerly "Little Alex"), a manipulative husband and childhood friend of both Anita and Princess

== See also ==
- Ghallywood, cinema of Ghana
- 2006 in film
