= Shaida Buari =

Ghanaian businesswoman (born 1982)

- Born: 25 July 1982 (age 44); Greater Accra, Ghana
- Citizenship: Ghanaian
- Education: St. Mary's High School in Accra; University of Ghana
- Occupation: Businessperson
- Years active: 2002–present
- Spouse: Kunle Nubi (m. 2011)
- Parent: Sidiku Buariand Elizabeth Mirabelle Odonkor
- Relatives: Nadia Buari (half-sister)

Shaida Buari (born 25 July 1982) is a Ghanaian businesswoman, philanthropist, model, and the title winner of the 2002 Miss Ghana beauty pageant.

== Early life and education ==
Shaida Buari was born in Accra, Ghana, to Alhaji Sidiku Buari; a business magnate as well as a musician, who for 12 years held the office of the president of the Musician Union of Ghana, and Elizabeth Mirabelle Odonkor, who runs a bridal shop and PR service for women in Accra. Shaida's parents divorced in 1997. She has two younger brothers: Sidiku Buari Jr., an engineer who runs his own auto shop, and King Faisal Buari; motivational speaker and owner of the Buarich Group of Companies. Actress Nadia Buari is her half-sister. Shaida attended the Alsyd Academy for her basic education. She went to St. Mary's High School in Accra, where she was elected entertainment prefect, and held fundraisers for several school projects. It was also in high school that her modelling career took off after she won the (now defunct) Source modeling competition in 1998. Following appearances in several television commercials, she entered and won the Miss Ghana pageant in 2002, with which she started her philanthropic work. She also competed in the Face of Africa modelling competition where she made it to the final five.

Buari graduated with honours from the University of Ghana, majoring in psychology with a minor in political science. She volunteered at the psychiatry hospital in Accra where she researched on the correlation between tumor location and mental illness at the Korle-Bu Teaching Hospital for a year.

== Career ==
Buari represented Ghana in the Miss World Pageant in 2003. As part of her social responsibility project as title winner, she worked with UNICEF, Right To Play on projects relating to sensitisation on social stigma that plagues HIV/AIDS patients, as well as helping to educate parents on the importance of certain vaccinations in helping curb diseases in young children. This exposure let to her forming her non profit organization; Helplink Foundation. Buari in collaboration with certain corporate entities successfully footed the hospital bills of a number of children who needed that assistance.

== Philanthropy and other endeavours ==
In 2013, while pregnant with her son, Buari founded Tellitmoms.com which is a viral online community for moms and moms to be, which among other things, provides tips on parenting and childcare. Tellitmoms in collaboration with NP Ghandour donated hand sanitizers and overalls to the maternity ward at Korle Bu Teaching Hospital. Also, it organizes a series of events where they showcase products and services for parents and parents to be. They gave out a few car seats to help encourage child car safety in Africa. Buari has since collaborated with Gloradelle, Graco Ghana, Audylot, Mini Me, Naabils, Iye Naturals, Sahara Rise, Disney Ghana, Baby Beds Beddings and Beyond, Baby Foods and More, Haute Mummy Maternity, Adora Intimate, Selina BeB, Bvenaj, Buarich Group, Kaa Service, Bon Collection, Nature's Brew, Beva Collection, Bri Wireduah, Rhema Collection, Cheerbaby, women reproductive health, Rubies House of Beauty, amongs others.

== Personal life ==
Buari married Kunle Nubi in 2011. They founded the oil and gas company Energem.
