= Beyonce and Rihanna =

2008 Nigerian film

- Directed by: Afam Okereke
- Written by: Anthony Kehinde Joseph
- Produced by: Sylvester Obadigie
- Starring: Nadia Buari; Omotola Jalade Ekeinde; Jim Iyke; Uche Jombo
- Distributed by: FilmOne Distribution
- Release date: 2008
- Running time: 97 minutes
- Country: Nigeria
- Language: English

Beyonce and Rihanna is a 2008 Nigerian drama film directed by Afam Okereke and produced by Sylvester Obadigie. The film stars Nadia Buari, Omotola Jalade Ekeinde, Jim Iyke, and Uche Jombo. It follows two young women whose rivalry in a campus singing competition mirrors the popularly perceived feud between American artists Beyoncé and Rihanna. ·

== Plot ==
The story follows two college rivals, Bernice (played by Nadia Buari) and Rhyme (played by Omotola Jalade Ekeinde), who compete in a statewide talent contest aimed at discovering the next major recording star. Their rivalry intensifies as their personas begin to resemble the public images of American singers Beyoncé and Rihanna. Jim Iyke appears as Jay-Jay, a character loosely inspired by Jay-Z.

== Cast ==
- Omotola Jalade Ekeinde as Rhyme
- Nadia Buari as Bernice
- Jim Iyke as Jay-Jay
- Uche Jombo as (supporting role)
- Tony Goodman as Knowles
- Joy Osawaru as Vivian
- Sonzie as Kane

== Reception ==
Beyonce and Rihanna has remained a noted example of late-2000s Nollywood melodrama, frequently referenced in retrospectives on Nigerian home video cinema. Critics have highlighted its storyline, performances, and its loose parallels to international pop culture rivalries.
