= Abdul Salam Mumuni =

Ghanaian film maker

Abdul Salam Mumini
- Occupation: film maker.

Abdul Salam Mumini is a Ghanaian film maker.

== Career ==
His first film was God Loves Prostitutes, which starred Nollywood star Genevieve Nnaji. Salam's Venus Film Production is responsible for the discovery of the likes of Van Vicker, Jackie Aygemang, Nadia Buari and a host of emerging others.

== Credits ==
- Return of Beyonce
- Beyonce
- Mummy's Daughter
- Wedlock of the Gods
- Darkness of Sorrow
- My mothers Heart
- Divine Love
- Heart of Men
- The Game
- Foreplay
