= Kimberly Scott (singer) =

American R&B singer (born 1986)

- Born: 1986 (age 38–39); Landover, Maryland, U.S.
- Genres: R&B, soul, pop, funk, hip-hop soul, gospel, go-go
- Occupation: Singer-songwriter
- Instrument: Vocals
- Years active: 1998–present
- Labels: Sony Music Entertainment (1998); K.I.M. Productions (Indie)
- Website: www.myspace.com/kimloves2sing

Kimberly Scott (born 1986 in Landover, Maryland) is an American R&B singer. She first performed in public when she was five years old and won the amateur-night contest five times at the Apollo Theater. After opening up for R&B group Immature, Kimberly got a record deal at the age of eleven. In early 1998, Kimberly's first single "Tuck Me In" became her biggest hit to date, peaking at #58 on the Billboard Hot 100 and #21 on Billboard's Hot R&B\Hip-Hop Singles & Tracks chart. Her self-titled debut album, released by Columbia Records in 1998, peaked at #95 on Billboard's Top R&B\Hip-Hop Albums chart.

In 1997, she also collaborated with Taiwanese singer Harlem Yu in a remake of the Barbara Mason's classic song "Yes, I'm Ready", which was included in Harlem Yu's English cover album Harlem Music Television.

In 2002, she released her second album Y'all Ain't Ready on the independent label The Cipher. As of 2010, she is living in Washington, DC with her twin sons and is a Lead Mic of the band Love District. She has also started her own label, K.I.M. Productions, and is at work on her third studio album.

== Discography ==
=== Albums ===
- Kimberly Scott (1998)
- Y'all Ain't Ready (2002)

=== Singles ===
- Tuck Me In (1997)
- Don't Leave Me Alone (1998)
- Get Krunked (2002)
- Shake Down (2002)

=== Collaboration ===
- "Yes, I'm Ready" (1997) (duet with Harlem Yu)
