= Missionary Sisters of the Holy Rosary =

Irish Roman Catholic missionary order of nuns (founded 1924)

Missionary Sisters of the Holy Rosary (MSHR) is a Roman Catholic apostolic congregation of women religious founded by Bishop Joseph Shanahan CSSp (Irish born bishop in Nigeria) on 7 March 1924, in Killeshandra, County Cavan, Ireland. They are sometimes referred to as the Killeshandra Nuns. The order received canonical recognition by Pope John XXIII in 1938.? Its initial mission was to Nigeria in 1928, but over the years it grew to mission in other countries in Africa, developing schools and medical facilities.

== History ==
In 1954, the Holy Rosary Sisters took charge of the clinic at Serabu, Sierra Leone from the Sisters of St. Joseph of Cluny. In 1965 the order opened their second hospital at Panguma, in the Eastern Province of Sierra Leone which they administered until 1986.

Due to the civil war the order had to leave Sierra Leone in 1994, and as a result the sisters moved to Gambia where refugees from the conflict had fled.

During the Nigerian Civil War (1967-1970), the sisters still ministered the people in the breakaway area of Biafra, and were involved in the relief services to those affected by the war, following the end of the war, foreign missionaries were expelled from southern Nigeria, at this time local Missionary Sisters took over the running of the schools, and medical facilities set up by the order.

It opened its US mission in Pennsylvania in 1951, and in São Paulo, Brazil in 1966. In 1992 a mission in Mexico started.

The original convent of the Holy Rosary in Killeshandra was bought by the sisters in 1924 and was formerly Drummully House. With the drop in vocations in Ireland, they developed a retreat and conference centre in 1976, and closed the house in 1985. A new building was opened in Cavan Town and in Dublin in 1985; in 2012 the old convent, which had become derelict and had been vandalised, was demolished. In 1991 the order participated with many other religious organisations in the establishment of the Kimmage Mission Institute (1991-2006) to combine their training efforts.

The order now has novitiates in Cameroon, Nigeria, and Kenya.

Over the years in Africa they set up over 200 elementary schools, 40 secondary schools and 32 hospitals.

The Friends of the Killeshandra Nuns is an organisation which fundraises to provide for retiring nuns returning to Ireland, its patron is Sabina Higgins (wife of the Irish president) who has two cousins members of the order. In 2014 with the help from fundraisers, the order opened a retirement home in Artane, Dublin, Ireland, for its missionary sisters, it was officially opened by former Taoiseach John Bruton whose first cousin is a member of the order.

In April 2023 a group called the pacesetters, of 21 former pupils from the class of 1986, of Our Lady of Lourdes College Mankon, in Cameroon, which was celebrating its Diamond Jubilee, visited Ireland to thank the Nuns for their education.

== Notable sisters ==
- Hillary Lyons - physician, pediatrician, surgeon, and obstetrician
- Lucy O'Brien - physician and obstetrician
- Mona Tyndall - obstetrician and gynecologist

== Institutions founded or run by the Holy Rosary Order ==
=== Cameroon ===
- Our Lady of Lourdes College Mankon, Cameroon. (founded 1963)

=== Nigeria ===
- Holy Rosary College (previously known as Holy Rosary Secondary School), Port Harcourt (founded 1958)
- Holy Rosary College, Enugu, teacher-training college (founded 1935) Novitiate Community, Enugu
- Holy Rosary Girls’ College, Gwagwalada, Wuse Community Abuja
- Holy Rosary Girls’ College, Nsugbe
- Queen of the Rosary Secondary School, Gboko (founded 1963), originally a primary school founded in 1958

=== Sierra Leone ===
- Holy Rosary School, Bo (founded 1958)
- Holy Rosary School School, Kenema (founded 1968 as Teacher Training College, now a girls' secondary school)
