= Yes, I'm Ready =

1965 single by Barbara Mason

Single by Barbara Mason

from the album Yes, I'm Ready
- B-side: "Keep Him"
- Released: May 1965
- Recorded: March 1965
- Genre: Soul, R&B, pop
- Length: 3:06
- Label: Arctic Records
- Songwriter: Barbara Mason

Official audio
- "Yes, I'm Ready" on YouTube

"Yes, I'm Ready"

Single by Teri DeSario with K.C.

from the album Moonlight Madness (by Teri DeSario)
- B-side: "With Your Love"
- Released: December 3, 1979
- Genre: Pop
- Length: 3:19
- Label: Casablanca Records
- Songwriter: Barbara Mason
- Producer: Harry Wayne Casey

"Yes, I'm Ready" is a song by Barbara Mason from her debut album Yes, I'm Ready (1965). It has been covered by numerous artists, and was a hit single for Teri DeSario and K.C. when they recorded a duet version in 1979.

== Barbara Mason ==
Mason, a soul / R&B singer from Philadelphia, Pennsylvania, had released a few singles while she was a teenager in the mid-1960s. "Yes, I'm Ready" became Mason's first big hit on the music charts, peaking at No. 2 on the Billboard R&B chart, and No. 5 on the Billboard Hot 100 chart in the summer of 1965. While Mason would continue recording into the 1980s, this song has been her highest-charting hit. Mason later re-recorded the song for her 1973 album, Give Me Your Love. The key personnel who helped bring the recording to life later became the important creators of the "Philly Sound", including Kenny Gamble as a backup singer, Bobby Eli and Norman Harris on guitar, Ronnie Baker on bass and Earl Young on drums. Eli, Harris and Baker would later become principal members of MFSB and Kenny Gamble would co-found Philadelphia International Records with Leon Huff.

== Teri DeSario ==
DeSario, a vocalist from Miami, Florida, was a high school classmate of Harry Wayne Casey, best known as the lead vocalist and songwriter for KC and the Sunshine Band. Casey liked the original recording and wanted to record a cover version of the song, and he was producing DeSario's second studio album, Moonlight Madness, for Casablanca Records. Neil Bogart, president of the record label, had an idea to record the song as a duet, and it was the first single released from the album in late 1979. Their version of the song spent two weeks at No. 2 on the Billboard Hot 100 chart in March 1980, kept from the summit by "Crazy Little Thing Called Love" by the rock group Queen. It also spent two weeks at No. 1 on the Billboard adult contemporary chart and reached No. 20 on the Billboard R&B chart, earning Gold Record certification from the RIAA.

== Chart performance ==
=== Weekly charts ===
Barbara Mason

Chart (1965)	Peak position
Canada RPM Top Singles	12
US Billboard Hot 100	5
US Billboard R&B	2
US Cash Box Top 100	3

=== Year-end charts ===
Chart (1965)	Rank
US Billboard Hot 100	27
US Cash Box	54

Tom Sullivan

Chart (1976)	Peak position
US Billboard Bubbling Under the Hot 100	103
US Billboard Adult Contemporary	44

Teri DeSario with K.C.

Chart (1979–80)	Peak position
Australia (Kent Music Report)	30
Belgium	20
Canada RPM Top Singles	10
Netherlands	21
New Zealand (RIANZ)	8
US Billboard Adult Contemporary	1
US Billboard Hot R&B/Hip-Hop Songs	20
US Billboard Hot 100	2

Chart (1980)	Rank
Canada	73
US Billboard Hot 100	24
US Cash Box	34

== Other versions ==
"Yes, I'm Ready" has been covered by other artists, including Mona Carita (as "Tahdon"), Shirley Ellis, Gladys Knight & the Pips, Maureen McGovern, Jeffrey Osborne, and Carla Thomas.

In 1986 it was recorded as a duet by the artist Jed and American singer La Toya Jackson and released as a 7" single only in Japan, with an instrumental version on the B-side. It was not included on any of Jackson's album.

In 1997 Kimberly Scott, mostly known for her hit "Tuck Me In", covered this song with Taiwanese musician Harlem Yu, arranged by Eric Hung which was included in Harlem Yu's 1997 English cover album Harlem Music Channel.

Chicago's hit "Beginnings" ("Live at Tanglewood" version) includes the line "I don't even know how to hold your hand" from "Yes, I'm Ready".

Barbara Mason's original 1965 recording was sampled by Phantogram for their 2013 hit single "Fall In Love." This version was also sampled by American Rapper Key Glock, for his song "She Ready". Rapper Nine Vicious also sampled the song for "A Song".

== See also ==
- List of number-one adult contemporary singles of 1980 (U.S.)
