= Good Neighbor (2001 film) =

2001 film by Todd Turner

- Poster
- Directed by: Todd Turner
- Written by: T.S. O'Kelly, Mary Grace Higgs
- Produced by: Todd Turner, Mary Grace Higgs
- Starring: Billy Dee Williams, Danica McKellar, Tobin Bell
- Cinematography: Michael C. Stailey
- Music by: Don Grady
- Distributed by: Creative Light Worldwide
- Release date: 2001
- Running time: 86 minutes
- Language: English

Good Neighbor, also called The Killer Next Door (MIFED (Mercato internazionale del film e del documentario) Title), is a 2001 thriller film with Billy Dee Williams, Danica McKellar, and Tobin Bell. This is also the directorial debut of Todd Turner.

== Plot ==
Molly Wright is a college student who lives in an off-campus house with several friends. She studies criminology, works as a volunteer with a local church group, and manages her coursework. After Geoffrey Martin, an artist, moves into the neighboring house, Molly suspects that he may be a serial killer. Although some of her friends are skeptical of her suspicions, police detective Paul Davidson becomes interested in the neighborhood following several reported missing-person cases. Davidson investigates whether the disappearances are connected to Martin, while Molly may be at risk of becoming the killer's next victim.

== Cast ==
- Billy Dee Williams as Sgt. Paul Davidson
- Danica McKellar as Molly Wright
- Tobin Bell as Geoffrey Martin
- Christine Horn as Rea Pucker
- James Stephen Jones as Brad Farmer
- Moe Michaels as Levi (as Mohamed El Emam)
- Brian Bremer as Lt. Vandemeer
- Polly Craig as Sister Maya
- Amber Wallace as Young Molly
- Brandon O'Dell as Danny
- Ron Clinton Smith as Brian
- Kelly Finley as Mother
- Lucinda Carmichael as Amy
- Bill Greeley as Sgt. Peter Warfield
- Jeffrey Charlton as Bailey Parks
- Kathy Simmons as Professor
- Jennifer Crumbley as Carla Richardson
- Chet Dixon as Barney
- A.J. Jerrick as Ben
- Hawn Sterling as Javier
- Nathan Farmer as Frat Boy
- Randall Taylor as Officer 12
- Jon Huffman as Honus Balfore
- Syr Law as Deli (as Crystal Porter)
- Joan Glover as Brooklyn
- Charles Lawlor as Virgil
