= H. Gil Ingles =

Angolan record producer

- Born: Hermenegildo Pereira Ingles; Angola South West Africa
- Occupations: record producer, television producer, television host, and inspirational speaker
- Years active: 1995 - Present
- Website: www.xposure-entertainment.com

H. Gil Ingles (born Hermenegildo Pereira Ingles) also known as Gil Ingles or Hermenegildo Ingles, is an independent record producer, television producer, television technical director, television host, and inspirational speaker. Ingles has won several Monty Awards for his Television Show Productions at AMTV (public-access television cable TV), respectively, two songs from the Angolan POP star on his roster Paul G, have been nominated for a 2010 MTV Base Video Music Awards and for a 2008 KORA Award.

He was born in Angola, and grew up in Southern Maryland in the United States.

== Early life ==
H. Gil Ingles was born in Angola, South-West Africa, the son of Maria Flora Ingles, an educator, and Mateus P. Fontes Ingles an esquire and city prosecutor. As a child, he grew up in the city of Huambo, Angola, until several assassination attempts on his father forced his mother to send him to the United States to study under the guardianship of his aunt.

== Music career ==
In October 1995, Ingles alongside Reginald M. Rainey launched XPOSURE Entertainment a production company, that eventually in 2000 evolved into full artist development, production and management company.

After managing and recording some material for the project Angola’s R&B artist Anselmo Ralph in 2005, Ingles put his graduate studies on hold to focus his efforts on his supporting executive role at XPOSURE Entertainment, the company that manages the careers and music projects of various African artists like Paul G., IRINA, and Koby Maxwell.

He currently serves under XPOSURE Entertainment as an executive production, project management, and performs artistic direction for artists like Paul G, Irina D Franca, and Koby Maxwell.
