= Lucy O'Brien (doctor) =

Irish missionary sister and doctor

Sister Dr. Lucy O'Brien

Personal life
- Born: Nora Veronica O'Brien; 17 August 1923 Ballinderry, near Tuam, County Galway, Ireland
- Died: 10 April 2006 (aged 82) Lusaka, Zambia
- Education: University College Dublin
- Occupation: Medical Doctor, Missionary Nun

Religious life
- Religion: Roman Catholic
- Order: Missionary Sisters of the Holy Rosary

Sister Dr Lucy O'Brien MB, MRCOG, FRCPI (17 August 1923 – 10 April 2006) was an Irish missionary sister and doctor in Africa.

== Early life and education ==
Mary Lucy O'Brien was born Nora Veronica O'Brien in Ballinderry, near Tuam, County Galway on 17 August 1923. She was the second eldest of the eight children of Michael O'Brien and Nora (née Connolly). She had three sisters and four brothers. She attended the Mercy convent school in Tuam. She entered the convent of the Missionary Sisters of the Holy Rosary, in Killeshandra, County Cavan as a postulant in February 1943, professing as Sister Mary Lucy on 28 August 1945. She went to the University College Dublin to train as a doctor, qualifying MB, B.Ch. and BAO in 1952.

== Career ==
In 1953, O'Brien was sent to Nigeria. In 1959 she received a diploma in tropical medicine and hygiene, and for the next 14 years she worked in mission hospitals in west Africa. Alongside her colleagues, O'Brien opened the St Charles Borromeo hospital in Onitsha, Nigeria in 1964, where she was the medical superintendent. From 1967 to 1970 a war was fought between the region of Biafra and the federal government, with Onitsha being the capital of the Republic of Biafra, leading to the hospital and other buildings being repeatedly shelled and bombed. The local medical facilities were overwhelmed by refugees and casualties from both sides. O'Brien and her fellow aid workers worked in dangerous conditions, witnessing the famine which then devastated the local area. She had to leave Nigeria when the conditions worsened, alongside hundreds of other expatriates.

This allowed O'Brien to travel to England for further training in gynaecology, obtaining Membership of the Royal College of Obstetricians and Gynaecologists in 1971. After this she worked in Sierra Leone for four years. After a year in Rome, O'Brien took up a post as an obstetrician and gynaecologist in Monze Mission Hospital (later known as the Monze District Hospital) in 1976. She worked there until 1999, treating and operating on thousands of women and facilitating the training hundreds of doctors at postgraduate level. With her expertise, Monze became the national centre for repairing fistulas. However, the work of O'Brien and the hospital were put under increasing pressure with the AIDS epidemic from the 1990s onwards. O'Brien was central to many of the efforts to cope with Zambia's health crisis, sitting as a member of the country's medical council, the national AIDS advisory committee, the board of the University Teaching Hospital, Lusaka, and the executive of the Church Hospitals' Association of Zambia. In Ireland, her family and friends assisted in fundraising, for AIDS relief and other projects in Zambia which O'Brien started or aided with after her retirement in 1999. In 2004 when the Co-operative Society's shop in Newcastle, County Tipperary closed, the members decided to donate the funds to charity, and O'Brien used the fund of €10,000 to establish a farming development project in Zambia.

== Awards and honours ==
In 1998 O'Brien was made an honorary fellow of the Royal College of Physicians of Ireland. In 2004 she was awarded the Order of Distinguished Service, First Division by President Levy Mwanawasa for her service to the women of Zambia.

== Death and legacy ==
She died in Lusaka on 10 April 2006, and was buried in Chikuni Mission near Monze. In 2018, a new Zambian health post was named in honour of O'Brien.
