= Holy Rosary College, Enugu =

Information
- School type: Boarding school
- Established: 1935; 91 years ago
- Gender: Girls

The Holy Rosary College is an all-girls boarding school run by the missionary located in Enugu, Nigeria. It was opened on 2 February 1935 by Archbishop Charles Heerey. It was staffed and run originally by the Irish missionary nuns from the Missionary Sisters of the Holy Rosary. It was formerly a teacher training college for girls.

== Notable alumnae ==
- Joy Nwosu Lo-Bamijoko, ethnomusicologist, choral conductor, music critic and soprano

== See also ==
- Education in Nigeria
- List of schools in Nigeria
