= Our Lady of Lourdes College Mankon =

Catholic all-girls school in Mankon, Cameroon

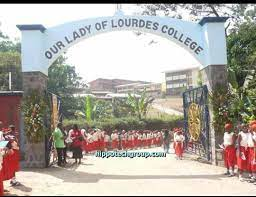
- Bamenda, Northwest; Cameroon

Information
- School type: Private, Boarding school
- Motto: To Serve With Love
- Religious affiliation: Roman Catholic
- Established: 1963; 63 years ago
- Founder: Fr. Nabben
- Authority: Archdiocese of Bamenda
- School code: Center N° 11025
- Principal: Sr. Linda Kiven
- Gender: All-girls
- Classes: Forms One to Upper Sixth
- Average class size: 50
- Language: English
- Houses: Immaculata, Rosary, Fatima, Bernadette, Shanahan, St Paul
- Colors: Cream and Red
- Nickname: OLALOCO
- Newspaper: Lourdes Beats
- Graduates: ~3700
- Alumni: Lourdes Ex-Students Association (LESA)
- Anthem: Come Children of the Rosary
- Brother college: Sacred Heart College

Our Lady of Lourdes College (previously known as Our Lady of Lourdes Secondary School), Mankon, is a Roman Catholic, all-girls secondary school located in Mankon, Bamenda in the North-West Region of Cameroon. It is run by the Holy Rosary Sisters under the authority of the Archdiocese of Bamenda. The school is reputed for producing some of the best results in the General Certificate of Education Ordinary and Advanced Levels in Cameroon.

The school is the only girls' boarding school in northwest Cameroon. The school teaches in English, but as of 2007 29% of its students speak French.

== History ==
Our Lady of Lourdes Secondary School was founded in 1963 by Father Nabben who was a Parish priest for St. Joseph's Parish, in Mankon, Bamenda. He wanted to offer education for girls, especially at a period when female education was not a priority. Upon completion of a school building in 1963, he asked Bishop Peeters, the Catholic Bishop of West Cameroon, permission to open the school. St. Joseph's Parish, Mankon generously donated a building and the establishment was named and entrusted into the care of Our Lady of Lourdes.

The school opened its doors on 15 October 1963. Our Lady of Lourdes College joined Saker Baptist College and Queen of the Rosary College, Okoyong, as the only all-girls secondary schools in Cameroon.

Throughout the years Our Lady of Lourdes College has expanded with new buildings, facilities, and programs serving about seven hundred students. The association of ex-students (or alumni) is known as the Lourdes Ex-Students Association (LESA) and ex-students are called LESANs.

Since the school was opened in 1963, it has undergone dramatic changes to date. As a boarding school, it first included four dormitories for the students called: Immaculata, Rosary, Fatima, and Bernadette. In 2005, a high school was built and opened under the school's principal, Sr. Eucharia Ndidi. With the addition of the high school came a change in the name of the school to Our Lady of Lourdes College. Furthermore, two more dormitories were built to accommodate the new high school.

== Diamond Jubilee (1963-2023) ==
The college celebrates its 60th anniversary in 2023. In April 2023 a group called the pacesetters, of 21 former pupils of Our Lady of Lourdes College from the class of 1986, visited Ireland, where the Holy Rosary Sisters were founded and where many of the teachers came from, to thank the Nuns for their education, including two retired principals Sr Mary Neville (1981-1985) and Sr Nuala Lahart.

== Golden Jubilee (1963-2013) ==
The college celebrated its 50th anniversary on 5 January 2013. Preparations for the Golden Jubilee celebration were launched in Cameroon on 28 January 2012 at the college campus. Other LESA branches all over the world also launched activities in 2012 in preparation for the Golden Jubilee in 2013.

== Notable alumni ==
Sahndra Fon Dufe actress Libianca singer
