= Nuella Njubigbo =

Nigerian actress and scriptwriter (born 1984)

- Born: 18 March 1984 (age 42); Anambra State, Nigeria
- Education: Government and public administration, Imo State University
- Alma mater: Imo State University
- Occupations: Actress, screenwriter
- Years active: 1999–present
- Spouse: Tchidi Chikere
- Children: 1
- Awards: Africa Magic Viewers Choice Awards; City People Entertainment Awards; Rising Star Award 2012

Nuella Njubigbo is a Nigerian actress, scriptwriter, model, and television personality. She joined the Nollywood family in 1999 and was nominated for the Rising Star Award category at the 2012 Nollywood Movies Awards.

== Early life and education ==
Nuella Njubigbo was born on 18 March 1984 in Anambra State in the southeastern part of Nigeria. She completed her primary and secondary school education in Anambra State. She is a native of Anambra State. she studied government and public administration at Imo State University (IMSU), Imo State, southeast Nigeria. She served in Delta State, south-south Nigeria during her National Youth Service Corps (NYSC) program.

== Personal life ==
On 29 March 2014, she married film director Tchidi Chikere in her family compound in Anambra State. Their union was the subject of the media for days mainly because the groom was previously married to another actress Sophia Chikere with three kids. Tchidi however gave reasons for the breakup of his previous marriage amidst public outcry. She has a baby girl from the marriage. On May 22, 2021, there were speculations that the marriage had ended as the couple unfollowed each other on Instagram. Later on, Tchidi confirmed the marriage actually ended and gave reasons.

She joined the Nollywood industry in 1999 with her first movie role in the film "Royal Destiny". She has acted in over 90 Nollywood movies. She has worked with prominent Nollywood stars like Ini Edo, Mercy Johnson, Desmond Elliot, Uche Jombo, Genevieve Nnaji, John Okafor, Pete Edochie, and Ken Erics.

She said in a chat with NollyNow that marriage and motherhood have taught her things she never knew before. She said "Marriage has made me a better person; more responsible and focused person. I don’t just do things again because I want to do them. Any decision I’m taking now I will ensure it benefits those around me. Marriage also has made me be more hard-working. If I were not married perhaps, I wouldn’t have been able to think of establishing my clothing line. I would have been jumping from one movie set to another. But now, I'm thinking about the future of my children".

== Filmography ==
- Truth or Dare (2023) as Jasmine
- Greedy Hearts (2023) as Alex
- Christmas Choppings (2022) as Nkechi
- My Ex (2022) as Adaobi
- Desecrated (2021) as Ego
- A Tiny Line (2020)
- Miracle (2019)
- Weakness (2018) as Vivian
- Preye (2018) as Obiageli
- Light Will Come (2017)
- A Little Lie (2016) as Ogechi
- Cats of Darkness (2015)
- Palace war (2014) as Amanda
- Mad Couple (2014) as Chiboka
- Jujuwood (2013) Imelda
- Brazilian Hair Babes (2013) as Ashira
- Dumebi the Dirty Girl (2012) as Cynthia
- Lost Highway (2012) as Onyi
- Amnesty (2011) as Juliet
- Open & Close (2011) as Sandra
- Royal war (2009) as Amara
- Life's incidence (2008) as Amaka
- Heart of a slave (2008)
- Royal Grandmother (2007) as Ihuaku

== Awards and recognitions ==
- Africa Magic Viewers' Choice Awards
- City People Entertainment Awards
- Rising Star Award 2012.
