= Chijindu Kelechi Eke =

Nigerian-American director

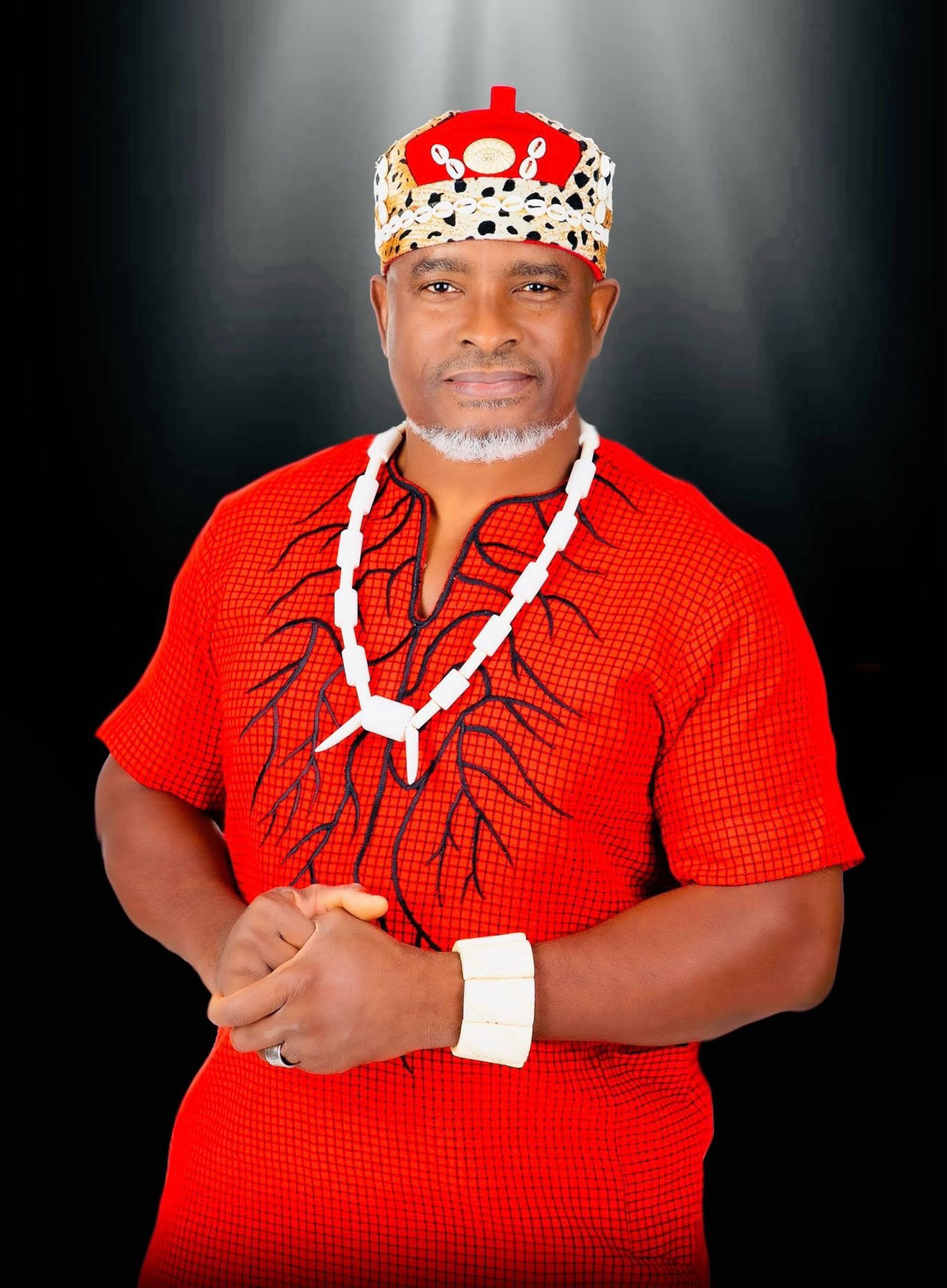
- Born: Owerri, Imo State
- Other names: Kelechi Eke, biGObi, Ihemba
- Citizenship: American
- Education: University of Texas at Dallas
- Occupation: Film director
- Years active: 2009–present
- Known for: Film and software engineering
- Notable work: Rootflix
- Title: Ichie Ihemba 1 of Imerienwe
- Awards: United States President's Lifetime Achievement Award

Chijindu Kelechi Eke// is a Nigerian American film director, software engineer, author, and humanitarian. He is the founder of The African Film Festival (TAFF), founder of Village Arts & Film Festival (VILLAFFEST), and the creator of African movies streaming service Rootflix. He is also the founder of African Women Arts & Film Festival (AWAFFEST), which celebrates the work of African women in film. His released films are used in globally recognized universities like Harvard, Yale, Stanford, as reference materials for African and Immigration Studies.

Eke is the author of Divided Roots, which explores the cultural, emotional, and family experiences of many African immigrants torn between two worlds - trying to maintain life in both their ancestral home and in the foreign country that they migrated to. The book is available on Amazon.

On September 30, 2022, Ichie Kelechi Eke initiated a project that he called Operation Light up Amafor to install solar streetlights in his community. During the coronation on December 26, 2023, he was crowned into royalty as the first "Ichie Ihemba" of Imerienwe in the Imo State of Nigeria.

Despite primarily living in the United States, Ichie Kelechi Eke was appointed as the board chairman of Para-Soccer Association of Imo State on February 20th, 2024 because of the passion he has for the development of sports and care for people with disabilities.

On September 2, 2024, Ichie Kelechi Eke called for unity in his community and offered to revive the abandoned Amafor Day celebration, which usually took place every December 27th in observance of cultural heritage. He transformed it to a carnival, characterized by vibrant displays of traditional attire, dance performances, and the inclusion of new elements such as a sports tournament and a beauty pageant, which offered opportunities for young women, including scholarships.

On October 5, 2024, Ichie Kelechi Eke presided over the inauguration of Odenigbo Cultural Club, an organization that he founded in Dallas to celebrate Igbo culture and to preserve Igbo language in the diaspora. He and members of the organization use this platform to teach their native tongue to their children born abroad and students willing to learn Igbo language.

In response to the federal government's call for Nigerians in the diaspora to return home and invest to boost the country's economy, Ichie Kelechi Eke opened a bakery in Owerri on February 1, 2025, to provide employment and to produce Ihemba Bread.

== Early life ==
Kelechi was born in Amafor, Imerienwe in Imo State, located in the southeastern region of Nigeria. He grew up in his home town, Owerri, and moved to the United States after high school to further his education.

== Education ==
Kelechi Eke started his elementary studies at LA Primary School in Amafor, Imerienwe; and finished at Nekede Town School, Owerri. He gained entry to Government Secondary School, Owerri, for his secondary studies. After his family moved to Ibadan, he transferred to Apata Community Grammar School to complete high school.

After completing secondary education in Nigeria, Kelechi gained admission to East Texas Baptist University, his father's alma mater, where he obtained a Bachelor of Science Degree in Computer and Mathematical Sciences. He later obtained a Master of Science in Information Technology and a Master of Business Administration from the University of Texas at Dallas.

== Career ==
Kelechi began his film career in 2009 as a producer and actor in Okra Principle. He started biGObi Productions in 2011 and directed the 2012 film Lost In Abroad which has been featured in libraries at Harvard University, Yale University, Stanford University, University of Iowa Libraries, Northwestern University and the University of Wisconsin–Madison, and Madison General Library System. He also directed the 2013 film False Engagement and the 2014 film The Stepchild.

In 2015, he founded The African Film Festival (TAFF), and held the first edition in Dallas, Texas. TAFF is a non-profit organization dedicated to providing mentorship programs for underserved aspiring filmmakers of African descent; encouraging the art of storytelling; and teaching African culture through motion pictures, arts, and storytelling.

In 2017, he began the design and engineering of Rootflix, a streaming platform for multicultural films, and launched it in 2019. Rootflix app is available for download both in the App Store (Apple) and in Google Play.

In 2019, Kelechi launched African Women Arts & Film Festival (AWAFFEST) in Dar es Salaam. The festival appreciates arts and stories by women and is hosted in different African countries after the first edition in Tanzania. Since then, it has been held virtually due to the Pandemic, and in Zambia and The Gambia.

In 2020, Kelechi launched Village Arts & Film Festival (VILLAFFEST) in Owerri, Nigeria to celebrate Indigenous Arts and Films. Through VILLAFFEST he wants to empower aspiring artists and hidden talents in various African villages. He has written, directed, produced and starred in many award-winning films that focus on Africa - related topics and Human rights.

In 2025, Kelechi added another venture to his portfolio by opening a bakery in his home town, through which he employed over 25 youths to produce Ihemba Bread, to help in reducing unemployment at the grassroots level and give back to society.

== Royalty ==
Kelechi Eke was crowned Ichie Ihemba 1 of Imerienwe because of his love for his people, commitment to the development of his community, and passion for the preservation and celebration of their culture. "Ihe" means light and "mba" means community. Ihemba means Light of the Community.

== Filmography ==
Title	Genre	Role	Year	Reference
Lost In Abroad	Drama	Writer, Director	2012	
False Engagement	Drama	Writer, Actor, Director	2013	
African Time	Comedy	Actor, Director	2014	
Weeping Ashes	Drama	Director	2014	
The Other Tribes	Drama	Director	2015	
The Black Pot	TV Series	Director	2015	
Akwuna	Short film	Actor	2022	
Ihemba	Documentary	Producer	2024	
Great Mansa	Documentary	Director, Producer	2026	

== Awards ==
=== Film Awards ===
2012 - Best African Filmmaker Living Abroad, African Movies Academy Awards.

2015 - People's Choice Best Director, Nollywood and African Film Critics Award.

2015 - Movie Achievement Award, Los Angeles Nollywood Film Awards.

2015 - Merit Award of Awareness at the Awareness Film Festival, California.

2015 - Best Screenwriter, International Movie Awards, Indonesia.

=== Humanitarian and Community Awards ===
On May 3, 2014, Kelechi received a Lifetime Achievement Award from the Nigerian-American Multicultural Council (NAMC).

On February 23, 2018, The African Community Achievement Award honored him for Outstanding Community Dedication on African Arts and Entertainment Development.

On June 13, 2018, he was honored by Hollywood and African Prestigious Awards (HAPA) as the 2018 African Culture and Art Ambassador in Hollywood, California.

On August 19, 2023, Kelechi Eke received the United States President Lifetime Achievement Award for his social contributions and humanitarian services.

On March 30, 2024, he received Award of Honor by Imo State Women Ambassadors International for supporting women and girl-child growth, as well as empowerment of the youths in the State.

On December 27, 2025, Ichie Kelechi Eke was honored by his people with Community Leadership Award for reviving their cultural heritage celebration and promoting unity and peace.
