= Joy Nwosu Lo-Bamijoko =

Nigerian ethnomusicologist, choral conductor (born 1940)

- Born: 27 August 1940 (age 85); Enugu
- Occupation: Ethnomusicologist
- Notable work: Cinema e Africa

Joy Ifeoma Nroli Nwosu Lo-Bamijoko (born 27 August 1940) is a Nigerian ethnomusicologist, choral conductor, music critic and soprano. A music teacher at the University of Lagos, she promoted Bel canto performances in Nigeria to develop interest in the opera and Italian style of singing. She has performed over 50 solo or group concerts in Nigeria and a few other countries.

In 1968, she published the book Cinema e Africa for Aracne editrice, a piece about Africans in Cinema.

== Life ==
Nwosu was born in Enugu, Nigeria, to the family of Charles Belonwu, a pastor, and Deborah Nwosu, both members of their church's choir. Nwosu soon joined her parents as a singer with the Faith Terbanacle Church choir. She continued to sing as a hobby in her secondary education and while she earned a grade II teaching certificate at Holy Rosary College, Enugu. While at the college, she represented it in various choir competitions and won seven solo singing competitions at the Enugu Festival of Arts.

After completing studies at Holy Rosary, she remained with the school as a teacher. Holy Rosary College was a catholic school; the nuns noticing Nwosu's talent in singing offered her a scholarship to study music at a College of Music in Dublin. She also secured an Eastern regional government scholarship with the opportunity to study music in Rome. Nwosu chose Rome and studied voice at the Conservatori Do Musica Santa Cecilia.

She departed for Italy in 1962 but before she could be accepted at the school, she had to audition and take Italian lessons. She completed studies after spending five years at the conservatori and followed with additional courses in mass communications. In Italy, she was featured in operatic roles such as Puccini's Turandot at the Garden Theatre of Castel Gandolfo and also took extra jobs in Cleopatra and the Tenth Victim. She then appeared in a little shown film, Giovanni Vento's, Ill Nero in 1966.

== Career ==
On returning from Europe, she worked as a producer with the Nigerian Broadcasting Corporation (NBC). At NBC, she formed a music group. In 1973, the group released the song UWAM under Decca records which became a hit. The popularity of the song led to more radio and television appearances for Nwosu; between 1975 and 1975, she performed on the Cultural Nights program on NBC. During Festac, she was lead soprano in Ayo Bankole's Festac Cantata and assistant director of music programs for the festivities. Around the time joined Lazarus Ekwueme's chorale group and traveled with the group to Ghana and various states in Nigeria for chorale performances. In 1975, she left NBC to become a lecturer with University of Lagos.

Nwosu did not have a doctorate degree and met some opposition in academia from lecturers such as Akin Euba who didn't feel she deserved a position in the department. In 1978, she was admitted to Michigan for a doctorate which she completed in 1981. On returning from Michigan, Nwosu was able to garner more respect among her male dominated colleagues. Between 1986 and 1987, she was head of the music department and later head of the music unit in the cultural studies centre.

Nwosu left Ekwueme's chorale to form her own group, Joy Nwosu and Her Ensemble in the early 1980s. In 1985, the group gave a three-day performance at the National Arts Theatre, Iganmu to commemorate Nigeria silver jubilee.

== Later life ==
Nwosu retired from the University of Lagos in the late 1990s and traveled to America where she initially attempted to obtain a university appointment without success, then briefly worked as a home care aide before becoming a high school music teacher in New Jersey. She has written two books, Mirror of Our Lives and Legend of the Walking Dead: Igbo Mythologies.

== Sources ==
- Sadoh, Godwin (2012). Joy Nwosu Lo-Bamijoko: The Saga of a Nigerian Female Ethnomusicologist. Bloomington: iUniverse.
