= Barbara Mason =

American soul singer (born 1947)

- Born: August 9, 1947 (age 78); Philadelphia, Pennsylvania, United States
- Genres: Soul; R&B
- Occupation: Singer
- Years active: 1964–present

Barbara Mason (born August 9, 1947) is an American soul singer with several R&B and pop hits in the 1960s and 1970s, best known for her self-written 1965 hit song "Yes, I'm Ready". She has released 12 albums, including her 1965 debut with Yes, I'm Ready, and has had 14 top 40 hits on the US Billboard R&B chart.

== Career ==
Mason initially focused on songwriting when she entered the music industry in her teens. As a performer she had a major hit single with her third release in 1965, "Yes, I'm Ready" (number 5 pop, number 2 R&B). She had modest success throughout the rest of the decade on the small Arctic label, run by her manager Jimmy Bishop. She reached the U.S. Billboard Hot 100 top 40 again in 1965 with "Sad, Sad Girl", and "Oh How It Hurts" in 1967. A two-year stay with National General Records, run by a film production company, produced one album and four singles which failed to find success.

In the 1970s, Mason signed to Buddah Records. She toughened her persona, singing about sexual love and infidelity with an uncommon frankness at the time in songs like "Bed and Board", "From His Woman to You", and "Shackin' Up" and would interrupt her singing to deliver straight-talking 'raps' about romance. She also continued to write some of her new material. Curtis Mayfield produced her on a cover version of Mayfield's own "Give Me Your Love", which restored her to the pop top 40 and R&B top ten in 1973; "From His Woman to You" (the response to Shirley Brown's single "Woman to Woman") and "Shackin' Up", produced by former Stax producer Don Davis in Detroit were also solid soul sellers in the mid-1970s.

Mason also sang vocals on the tracks "Sheba Baby," "I'm in Love with You," "A Good Man Is Gone," and "She Did It" on the soundtrack for the 1975 Pam Grier film, Sheba, Baby.

After scoring two more top ten R&B hits from her 1975 album, Love's the Thing, Mason left Buddah Records and signed with a succession of smaller labels. She continued to reach the charts periodically with more moderate hits. They included "I Am Your Woman, She Is Your Wife", which was produced in 1978 by Weldon McDougal (who had produced her first major success, "Yes I'm Ready") and another response song - this time to Richard "Dimples" Fields' 1980 single "She's Got Papers on Me" - titled "She's Got the Papers (But I Got the Man)". In 1984, she followed up on her own response song with the track, "Another Man" on West End Records. "Another Man" remains her last charting single to date.

Mason started to concentrate on running her own publishing company in the late 1980s. She released a new CD, Feeling Blue, in September 2007. Mason was still performing to sold-out audiences in 2016. Her most recent show was at the Terrance Theater in Long Beach, California. Mason was inducted into the Soul Music Hall of Fame on March 1, 2016.

== Discography ==
=== Studio albums ===
Year	Album	Peak chart positions		Record label
Year	Album	US	US R&B	Record label
1965	Yes, I'm Ready	129	—	Arctic
1968	Oh How It Hurts	—	42	Arctic
1970	If You Knew Him Like I Do	—	—	National General
1973	Give Me Your Love	95	17	Buddah
1973	Lady Love	—	29	Buddah
1974	Transition	—	—	Buddah
1975	Love's the Thing	187	42	Buddah
1977	Locked in This Position (with Bunny Sigler)	—	—	Curtom
1978	I Am Your Woman, She Is Your Wife	—	—	Prelude
1980	A Piece of My Life	—	—	WMOT
1984	Tied Up (UK only)	—	—	Other End
2007	Feeling Blue	—	—	Sunswept
"—" denotes a recording that did not chart or was not released in that territory.

=== Singles ===
Year	Single (A-side, B-side) Both sides from same album except where indicated	Peak chart positions			Album
Year	Single (A-side, B-side) Both sides from same album except where indicated	US	US R&B	UK	Album
1964	"Trouble Child" b/w "Dedicated to You" (Non-album track)	—	—	—	Yes, I'm Ready
1965	"Girls Have Feelings Too" b/w "Come to Me"	—	31	—	Yes, I'm Ready
1965	"Yes, I'm Ready" b/w "Keep Him"	5	2	—	Yes, I'm Ready
1965	"Sad, Sad Girl" b/w "Come to Me"	27	12	—	Yes, I'm Ready
1965	"If You Don't (Love Me, Tell Me So)" b/w "You Got What It Takes" (from Yes, I'm Ready)	85	—	—	Oh, How It Hurts
1966	"Is It Me?" b/w "Don't Ever Want to Lose Your Love" (Non-album track)	97	—	—	Oh, How It Hurts
1966	"I Need Love" b/w "Bobby Is My Baby" (Non-album track)	98	25	—	Oh, How It Hurts
1966	"Poor Girl in Trouble" b/w "Hello Baby" (Non-album track)	—	—	—	Oh, How It Hurts
1967	"You Can Depend on Me" b/w "Game of Love"	—	—	—	Oh, How It Hurts
1967	"Oh, How It Hurts" b/w "Ain't Got Nobody" (Non-album track)	59	11	—	Oh, How It Hurts
1968	"I Don't Want to Lose You" b/w "Dedicated to the One I Love" (Non-album track)	—	—	—	Oh, How It Hurts
1968	"(I Can Feel Your Love) Slipping Away" b/w "Half a Love"	97	—	—	Non-album tracks
1968	"I'm No Good for You" b/w "Don't Ever Go Away"	—	—	—	Non-album tracks
1969	"Take It Easy (With My Heart)" b/w "You Never Loved Me (At All)"	—	—	—	Non-album tracks
1969	"Happy Girl" b/w "You Better Stop It"	—	—	—	Non-album tracks
1970	"Raindrops Keep Fallin' on My Head" /	112	38	—	If You Knew Him Like I Do
1970	"If You Knew Him Like I Do"	112	38	—	If You Knew Him Like I Do
1970	"Just a Little Lovin'" b/w "Yes, It's You"	—	—	—	If You Knew Him Like I Do
1970	"When You Look at Me" b/w "I Should Be Leaving You"	—	—	—	Non-album tracks
1970	"I Can't Help It" b/w "Jean (Gene)" (from If You Knew Him Like I Do)	—	—	—	Non-album tracks
1971	"Pow Pow Song (Sorry Sorry Baby)" b/w "Your Old Flame" (from If You Knew Him Like I Do)	—	—	—	Non-album tracks
1971	"Hooked on a Feeling" b/w "Breaking Up Is Hard to Do" (from If You Knew Him Like I Do)	—	—	—	Non-album tracks
1972	"Bed and Board" b/w "Yes, It's You" (from If You Knew Him Like I Do)	70	24	—	Give Me Your Love
1972	"Woman and Man" b/w "Who Will Hurt You Next" (from Give Me Your Love)	—	—	—	Non-album track
1972	"Give Me Your Love" b/w "You Can Be with the One You Don't Love"	31	9	—	Give Me Your Love
1973	"Yes, I'm Ready" (re-recorded version) b/w "Who Will Hurt You Next"	125	—	—	Give Me Your Love
1973	"Children of Tomorrow" b/w "Out of This World" (from Give Me Your Love)	—	79	—	Non-album track
1973	"Caught in the Middle (of a One Sided Love Affair)" b/w "Give Him Up" (Non-album track)	—	—	—	Lady Love
1974	"World War Three" b/w "I Miss You Gordon"	—	—	—	Lady Love
1974	"The Devil Is Busy" b/w "All in Love Is Fair" (from Lady Love)	—	—	—	Transition
1974	"Half Brother, Half Sister" b/w "Our Day Will Come" (Non-album track)	—	—	—	Transition
1974	"From His Woman to You" b/w "When You Wake Up in Georgia" (Non-album track)	28	3	—	Love's the Thing
1975	"Shackin' Up" b/w "(There's) One Man Between Us"	91	9	—	Love's the Thing
1975	"We Got Each Other" (with the Futures)	—	38	—	Non-album tracks
1975	"Make It Last" (with the Futures)	—	35	—	Non-album tracks
1977	"Love Song" b/w "Locked in This Position"; Both sides with Bunny Sigler	—	—	—	Locked in This Position
1978	"I Am Your Woman, She Is Your Wife" b/w "Take Me Tonight"	—	14	—	I Am Your Woman, She Is Your Wife
1978	"Darling Come Back Home" b/w "It Was You Boy"	—	—	—	I Am Your Woman, She Is Your Wife
1980	"I'll Never Love The Same Way Twice" b/w "You Did Not Stay Last Night"	—	54	—	A Piece of My Life
1981	"She's Got the Papers (But I Got the Man)"—Part 1 b/w Part 2	—	29	—	Non-album tracks
1981	"On and Off" b/w "You're All Inside of Me"	—	—	—	A Piece of My Life
1984	"Another Man" b/w "Another Man" (Rap)	—	68	45	Tied Up
1984	"Don't I Ever Cross Your Mind Sometime" b/w "Don't I Ever Cross Your Mind Sometime" (instrumental)	—	—	—	Tied Up
"—" denotes a recording that did not chart or was not released in that territory.
