= Valorie Burton =

American writer, motivational speaker and entrepreneur

- Education: Florida State University; Florida A&M University; University of Pennsylvania
- Known for: Writer, Speaker, Coach, Entrepreneur
- Spouse: Jeff Burton

Valorie Burton is a life coach, author, motivational speaker and entrepreneur. She is the founder of the Coaching and Positive Psychology Institute (CaPP).

Burton has been featured on the TODAY Show and the Dr. Oz Show and has made regular appearances on CNN and HLN. She has written for Oprah Magazine, Essence Magazine and many others. She was a columnist for BlackAmericaWeb.com and is a frequent guest on CNN's Reclaim Your Career segment.

Burton co-hosted the Emmy Award-winning television program Aspiring Women, which aired on the Total Living Network (TLN). She has also co-hosted the national television program The Potter's Touch with T.D. Jakes which aired weekdays on the TBN and BET.

== Early years ==
Burton grew up moving a number of times as a child in an Air Force family, living in Florida, West Germany and Colorado. She spent eight years in Dallas, Texas, which is where she started her first business, The Burton Agency. Burton ran the marketing and public relations firm from 1997 until 2001. The agency helped companies shape their image, positively influence customers and increase sales. In 2001, she founded Inspire, Inc. In the same year, Burton was appointed by Texas Governor Rick Perry to the Governor's Commission for Women and served a two-year term. In 2009, she launched CaPP to address organization's coach training needs. The CaPP Institute offers coach training programs that focus on what makes people happier, more resilient, and prepared to perform better. The programs also provide participants with positive psychology research based tactics for entrepreneurial success.

Burton is a former Miss Black Texas USA, Miss Black USA "top 10" finalist, and a runner-up to Miss Texas. Ms. Burton is a credentialed member of the International Coach Federation and a member of the National Speakers Association.

== Education ==
Burton graduated from the University of Pennsylvania with a master's degree in applied positive psychology. She is also a graduate of Florida State University and has a master's degree in journalism from Florida A&M University.

== Publications ==
Burton is author of several books including Successful Women Think Differently, What's Really Holding You Back, and Happy Women Live Better, Rich Minds Rich Rewards, How Did I Get So Busy, Listen to Your Life, Why Not You? 28 Days to Authentic Confidence, Start Here Start Now, Get Unstuck, Be Unstoppable, and Where Will You Go From Here?, and Successful Women Speak Differently.

In Rich Minds, Rich Rewards (2001), she describes ways to focus "on what's truly important in life." In What's Really Holding You Back? (2005), Burton tackles fear, uncertainty and anxiety and how people can free themselves of fear. Library Journal calls How Did I Get So Busy? (2007) more than a "quick fix." Her book Why Not You? (2008), contains practical tips and a questionnaire for readers to "identify which four confidence levels they embody."

In 2020, Burton released her most recent book, "Life Coaching for Successful Women" and advice on New Year's resolution to loudly tell your goals and start with baby steps. Burton also gave decision-making advice, "Without understanding God deep in our hearts, there is no success".

== Personal life ==
Burton currently resides in Atlanta, Georgia.
