= Paul G =

Angolan musician

- Born: Paulo George Marques João; March 31, 1975 (age 51); Luanda, Angola
- Occupations: R&B singer, songwriter, producer, dancer
- Years active: 2004–present
- Website: www.paulgonline.com

Paulo George Marques João (born March 31), better known by his stage name Paul G, is an Angolan urban pop and R&B singer-songwriter, producer and dancer. He began his career as a founding member of Angola's first worldly known rap group South Side Posse (SSP) alongside Big Nelo, Jeff Brown, and Kudi. Later, Paul G went on to produce and guide the career of Bruna Tatiana, making her the first contestant from Angola in the hit real life television show Big Brother Africa. The success of his productions and collaborations with other artists gave him the opportunity to visit the United States of America, where he met with music producer H. Gil Ingles, a founding member of XPOSURE Entertainment. That sealed his career as a solo artist with the production of the debut album "Transition".

In 2009, Paul G released his debut album Transition, which contained the Kora-nominated hit "Freaking Me Out" that features hip-hop artist Alashus (a.k.a. C1), and the original version of MTV Base nominated remix hit "Bang It All" that featured Akon. In 2011, Paul G released an EP album entitled The Feeling that includes the 2010 Channel O Video Awards nominated self-titled remix "The Feeling" that features Maezee of the Teargas. Also in 2011, the song "Bang It All" earned Paul G a nomination at the Washington Area Music Association 26th Music Awards while the song"The Feeling" ranked Paul G among the top ten artists on the "Topo Dos Mais Queridos" (Top of the Most Liked) artists of Angola.

In addition to a successful recording career, Paul G has amassed a catalog of chart-topping songs that he has produced for other artists.

== Early life ==
Paul G was born in Luanda, Angola as Paulo Jorge Marques João. Due to the divorce of his parents Maria Natercia Batalha and Diogo João, Paul G was raised by his mother and step-father Rodrigo Duarte. As a young child, Paul G was an accomplished skate boarder and dancer. While in high school he adopted the stage name "Paul G" and joined the rap group called SSP. The group disbanded in 2004, and Paul G continued to produce songs for other artists before starting his solo career.

== Personal life Family ==
In 2011, Paul G's wife-to-be Juddy Da Conceicao, a model, television producer and presenter, gave birth to their first child, Azael.

== Discography ==
Year	Album	Role	Notes
2008	Transition	Artist	
2011	The Feeling	Artist	
