= Sidiku Buari =

Ghanaian musician and former athlete

- Born: Accra, Ghana
- Occupation: Musician

Sidiku Buari is a Ghanaian musician and former athlete. Buari was born in Accra. His early education was at the Government Boys School, Row Road, and the African College, both in Accra.

== Athletics ==
He was a silver medalist at the All-Africa Games held in Dakar, Senegal, in 1963 in the 400 meters race. During the athletics at the 1965 All-Africa Games held in Brazzaville, Republic of the Congo, he was a bronze medalist on the 4 x 400 meters relay Ghana team.

== United States ==
He moved to the United States in 1966. He studied music at the New York School of Music and then interior decoration at the La Sale University in Chicago, Illinois. He played non-professional baseball while in the United States.

== Music career ==
He returned to Ghana in 1985. He released the album Africa Responds to the World, which grossed 250,000 cedis. This won him an Entertainers Critics and Reviewers Association of Ghana (ECRAG) award. He has since released 16 albums in Ghana. He has been a past president of the Musicians Union of Ghana (MUSIGA) and Vice President of the International Federation of Musicians (FIM).

== Family ==
Sidiku Buari has two notable daughters: Nadia Buari, an actress and Shaida Buari, who was Miss Ghana 2002. He has a son, Malik Buari, who is a footballer.
