= Van Vicker =

Ghanaian actor and director

Joseph van Vicker
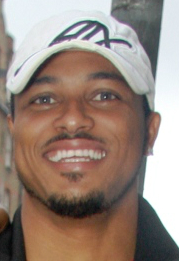
- Van Vicker in 2016
- Born: Joseph van Vicker; 1 August 1977 (age 49); Accra, Ghana
- Education: African University College of Communications
- Occupations: Film and television actor
- Years active: 2000–present
- Awards: 2009 Afro-Hollywood Award; 2011 Pan African Film Festival; 2012 Nafca; 2013 Ghana movie awards; Pyprus Magazine Screen Actors Awards; KumaWood Awards 2016
- Website: www.vanvicker.org

Joseph van Vicker (born 1 August 1977), better known as Van Vicker, is a Ghanaian actor, film director and humanitarian. He is the chief executive officer of Sky + Orange production, a film production house. Van Vicker received two nominations for "Best Actor in a Leading Role" and "Best Upcoming Actor" at the Africa Movie Academy Awards in 2008.

== Early life ==
Vicker was born in Accra, Ghana to a Ghanaian/Liberian mother and a Dutch father. His father died when he was six years old.

Vicker attended Mfantsipim School, along with fellow actor Majid Michel. He graduated from the African University College of Communications in 2021.

== Personal life ==
Vicker married Adjoa on 16 October 2003. They have three children. When they celebrated their 21st wedding anniversary, he thanked God and also praised his wife for always being by his side.

== Career ==
=== Television ===
Vicker started out in the entertainment world in radio as a presenter at Groove 106.3 fm (1999–2000) and Vibe 91.9fm (2001–2004) and as a television personality for TV3 Ghana (1997–1999) & Metro TV (2000–2004), Vicker appeared in the Ghanaian television series Sun city, which depicted university life. He played the character of LeRoy King Jr., a Fine Arts student born in the U.S. who arrives at Sun City to complete his education. The series ran for a total of 10 episodes.

=== Film ===
Soon, Vicker was cast in his first film Divine Love as a supporting character. This film coincidentally, was also the debut roles for fellow actors Jackie Appiah and Majid Michel who were cast as the female and male lead respectively.

Vicker is usually cast as the male romantic lead, often alongside actresses Jackie Appiah and Nadia Buari. He is often compared to fellow Ghanaian actor Majid Michel and Nigerian Ramsey Nouah.

=== Nollywood breakthrough ===
Vicker has appeared in numerous Nollywood films alongside prominent Nollywood actors, including Tonto Dikeh, Mercy Johnson, Stephanie Okereke, Chika Ike and Jim Iyke. His Nollywood movies include; My Soul Mate, Heart of Fire, Popular King, Gambling with Marriage, Harvest of Love, Stolen Will, The Joy of a Prince, Discovered, The Kingdom and Against the law.

=== International success ===
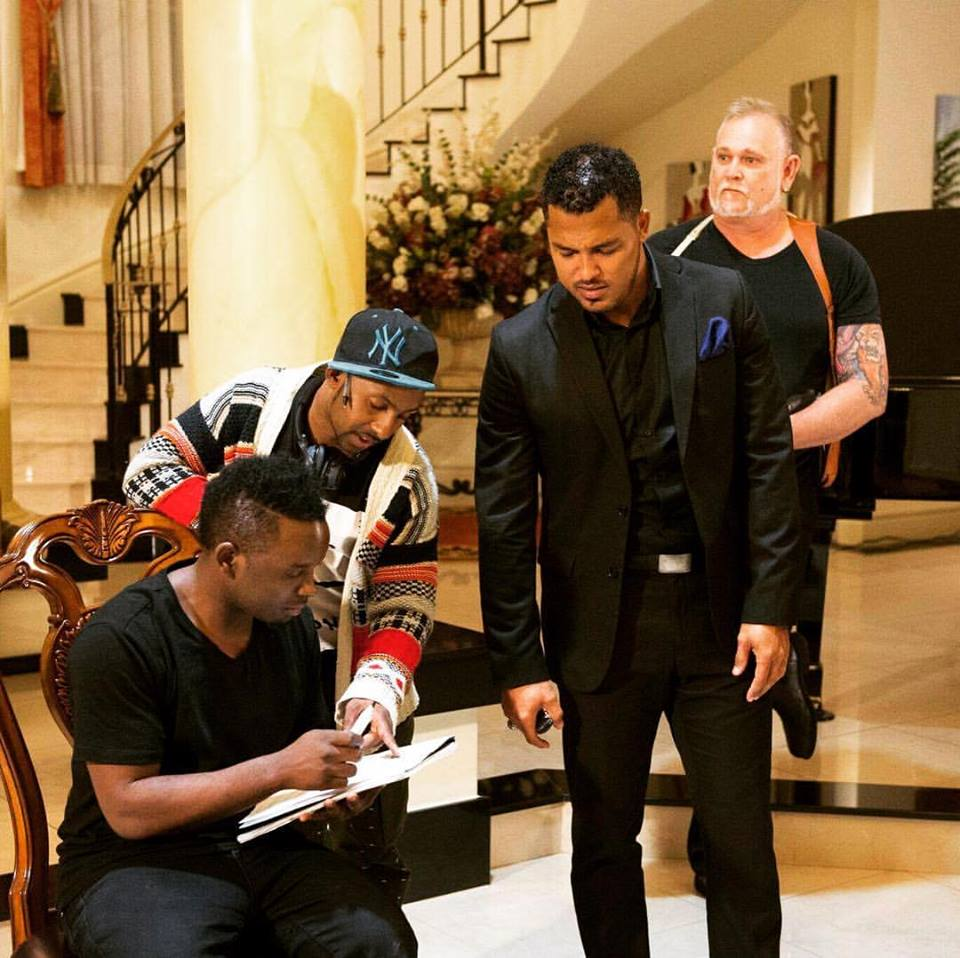
Vicker on the set of Australian film Cop's Enemy, with Prema Smith and John K-ay

Vicker has directed, starred in, and produced five films under his Sky + Orange Productions since 2008. 2012 was the biggest year for his production house, earning him the NAFCA Best Actor and Director Awards for his comedy movie, Joni Waka.

Vicker has been nominated for and won numerous awards from Africa to the Caribbean. Awards include Ghana Movie Awards, ACRAG awards and the Nollywood Academy Films Critics’ Awards. In 2009, he won the Best African Caribbean Actor and Best Actor African American and in 2011, he won the Pan African creative actor. In 2013, he won the Best International Actor award at the Papyrus Magazine Screen Actors Awards (PAMSAA) 2013, which was held in Abuja, Nigeria.

== Awards and nominations ==
Year	Award	Category	Recipient	Result
2008	4th Africa Movie Academy Awards	Best Actor in a Leading Role	The Return of Beyonce/Princess Tyra	Nominated
2008	4th Africa Movie Academy Awards	Best Upcoming Actor	The Return of Beyonce/Princess Tyra	Nominated
2009	Afro-Hollywood Award	Best Actor (African film category)		Won
2010	2010 Ghana Movie Awards	Best Actor Leading Role (Local Film)	Dna Test	Nominated
2011	2011 Ghana Movie Awards	Best Actor Leading Role	Paparazzi	Nominated
2011	Pan African Film Festival	Africa Channel's Creative Achievement Award	Himself	Won
2012	Nafca	Best Comedy Movie	Joni Waka	Won
2013	2013 Ghana Movie Awards	Best Actor (Local Film)	Joni Waka	Won
2013	Pyprus Magazine Screen Actors Awards	Best International Actor		Won
2014	2014 Ghana Movie Awards	Favourite Actor		Nominated
2015	Nafca	Best Actor in a Leading role (Diaspora film)	Heart Breaker's Revenge	Nominated
2016	2016 Africa Magic Viewers Choice Awards	Best Actor Drama/Series	A long Night	Nominated
2016	2016 Nigeria Entertainment Awards	Best Actor Africa/Non Nigerian	A long Night	Nominated
2016	KumaWood Awards	Best Collaboration	Broni W'awu	Won

== Filmography ==
Year	Film	Role	Notes
2004	Divine Love		with Majid Michel & Jackie Aygemang
2006	Beyonce: The President's Daughter	Raj	with Nadia Buari & Jackie Aygemang
2006	Darkness of Sorrow	CK (Charles)	with Nadia Buari
2006	Mummy's Daughter		with Nadia Buari & Jackie Aygemang & Okediji Alexandra
2006	The Return of Beyonce	Raj	with Nadia Buari & Jackie Aygemang
2007	American Boy	"Nelly"	with Nadia Buari
2007	I Hate Women	Rocky	with Jackie Aygemang
2007	Innocent Soul		
2007	In the Eyes of My Husband	Leo	with Nadia Buari
2007	Princess Tyra	Kay	with Jackie Aygemang, Yvonne Nelson
2007	Royal Battle	Lawrence	with Majid Michel & Jackie Aygemang
2007	Slave to Lust		with Nadia Buari, Ini Edo, Mike Ezuruonye & Olu Jacobs
2007	Wedlock of the Gods		
2008	Broken Tears	Ben	with Genevieve Nnaji & Kate Henshaw-Nuttal
2008	Corporate Maid	Desmond	
2008	Friday Night		
2008	Jealous Princess	Sam	with Chika Ike & Oge Okoye
2008	River of Tears	Ben	with Genevieve Nnaji & Kate Henshaw-Nuttal
2008	Total Love	Nick	with Jackie Aygemang
2009	Twilight Sisters	Micky	with Oge Okoye
2009	Royal War	Uzodimma	with Ini Edo, Rachael Okonkwo
2009	Beyond Conspiracy	Michael	
2010	Discovered		
2010	Loyal Enemies	Michael	
2010	Kingdom in Flames		
2010	Mind Game	Richie	
2011	Paparazzi Eye In The Dark	Rich	
2012	Joni Waka	Joni Waka	
2013	One Night In Vegas	Tony	with Jimmy Jean-Louis, Michael Blackson, Sarodj Bertin
2014	The Heart Breaker's Revenge	Dalyboy	with Dalyboy Belgason, Brittany Mayti, Sarodj Bertin
2016	Skinned	Robert/ Bobby	with LisaRaye McCoy, Jasmine Burke
2017	Cop's Enemy	Christopher "Shadow" Ifechi	
Pending	Day After Death		with Wema Sepetu
