= Sarodj Bertin =

Haitian lawyer and dembow singer (born 1986)

- Born: Sarodj Bertin; April 11, 1986 (age 40); Port-au-Prince, Haiti
- Height: 5 ft 9 in (1.75 m)
- Beauty pageant titleholder
- Title: Miss Haiti Universe 2010
- Hair color: Black
- Eye color: Brown
- Major competitions: Miss Universe 2010; Reina Hispanoamericana 2012 (Winner)

Sarodj Bertin Durocher (born April 4, 1986) is a Haitian lawyer and beauty pageant titleholder.

== Early life and education ==
Bertin was born in Haiti, and is the daughter of Mireille Durocher and Jean Bertin. Bertin's mother, who was a lawyer and an outspoken critic of then president Jean-Bertrand Aristide, was murdered on March 28, 1995, in Port-au-Prince. She was shot in broad daylight while being driven by a client, Eugene "Junior" Baillergeau, away from the U.S. military's Camp Democracy headquarters. Baillergeau, who was killed along with Durocher Bertin, was in litigation with the U.S. military over damages a U.S. helicopter had allegedly done to his private plane.

After her mother's murder, she was sent to the Dominican Republic where she grew up in exile.

In the Dominican Republic, she learned Spanish and English, in addition to her native French and Haitian Creole.

Between 2003 and 2010, she studied law in Universidad Iberoamericana (UNIBE) of Santo Domingo and Pontificia Universidad Católica Madre y Maestra (PUCMM) of Santiago, and is currently a human rights lawyer. She has worked for the International Alliance for Haiti's Recovery.

== Career ==
In 2015, she was selected on Luz García’s Noche de Luz programme as a "Summer’s Hot Body".

=== Pageantry ===
After the 2010 Haiti earthquake, Bertin entered the Miss Haiti Universe contest and won. She spent several months in Puerto Rico with the director of the Miss Dominican Republic and Miss Haiti franchises, Magali Febles, who took charge of her training for 2010 Miss Universe pageant.

She represented Haiti in the Miss Universe 2010 beauty pageant held in Las Vegas on August 23, 2010. Bertin believed that competing in Miss Universe would give the people of Haiti a voice, stating, "there are many people who want to help but don't know how and sometimes they need a voice to tell them what are the necessities of the people. I want the people, through me, to be who says what their necessities are." On 25 October 2012, she won the Reina Hispanoamericana 2012 pageant.

=== Radio and television ===
- Telenoticias (w:es:Telesistema; 2014–2015)
- Aquí Se Habla Español (w:es:Antena Latina; 2014–present)

=== Filmography ===
- Voodoo's List (2011); documentary
- One Night in Vegas (2013) – Ashley
- Everybody Cheats (2013) – Francesca
- Sharktopus vs. Mermantula (2014) – Widow; television film
- The Heartbreaker's Revenge (2014) – Rochelle; directed by Dalyboy Belgason
- Sweet Micky for President (2014) – Herself; documentary
- Boone: The Bounty Hunter (2015) – Crystal
- Ulterior Motives: Reality TV Massacre (2015) – Amber
- Sasha Lanes (2023) – Sabrina
- The Switch Up (2023) – Nastassja

== Awards ==
- 2013 – Motion Picture Association of Haiti (MPAH) Haiti Movie Awards, Humanitarian Award Recipient
- 2015 – MPAH Haiti Movie Awards, Best Supporting Actress – The Heartbreaker's Revenge

Preceded by Glaphyra Jean-Louis	Miss Haiti; 2010	Succeeded by Anedie Azael
