= Chet Anekwe =

Nigerian film director and actor

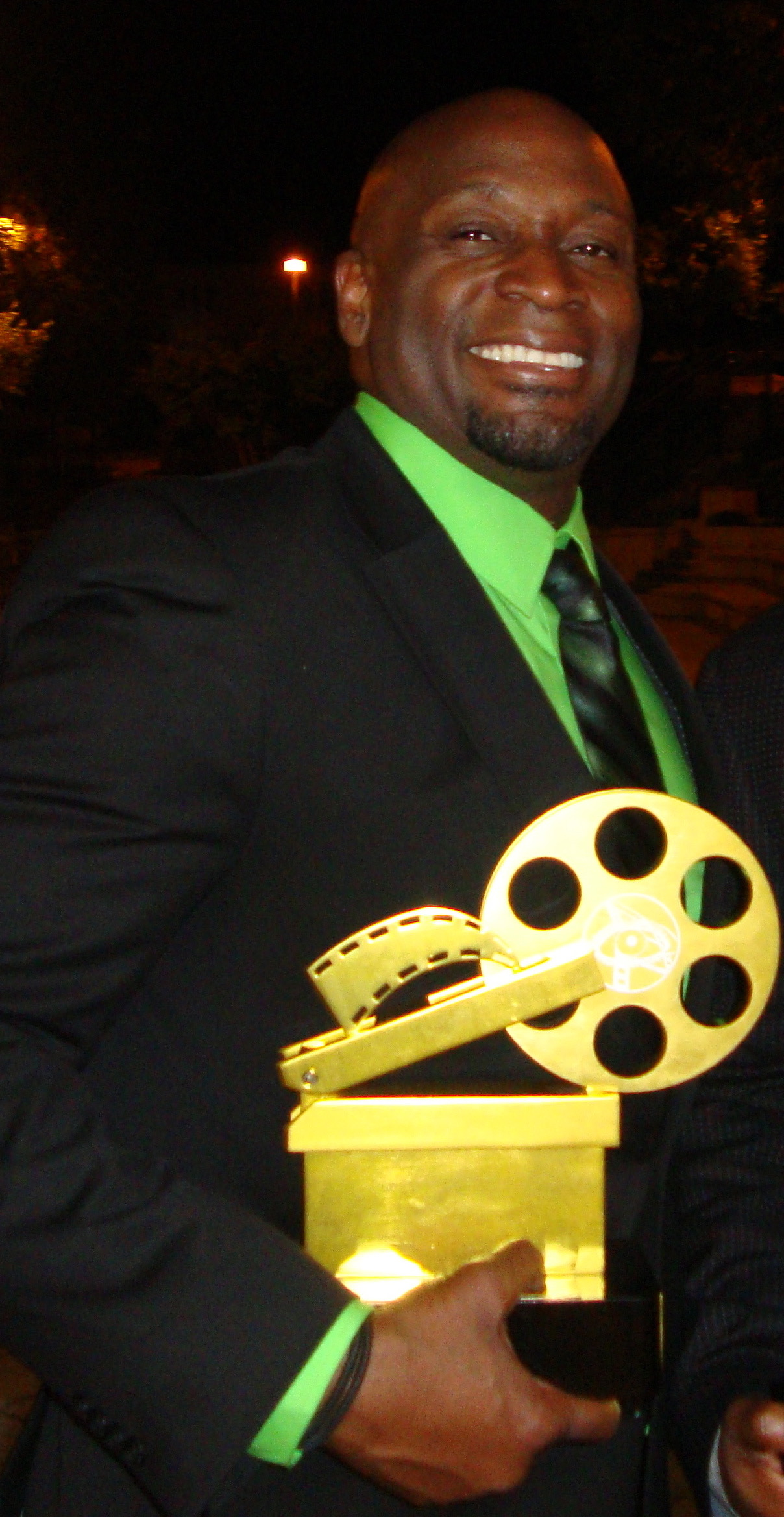
- Anekwe, 2012 NAFCA Awards
- Born: Lagos, Nigeria
- Occupations: Actor, writer, director
- Years active: 2001–present
- Awards: Golden Icons Academy Movie Awards, Best actor in diaspora
- Website: chetanekwe.com

Chet Anekwe // is an actor and filmmaker who was born in Nigeria and raised in New York City. His work spans Hollywood, Nollywood and the New York Theater.

== Filmography ==
Year	Title	Role	Notes
2001	Sheena	Karnivan	Episode: "Tyler Returns"
2004	Shpionskie igry: Nelegal		
2004	Dream Job	Himself	TV series
2006	Phat Girlz	Flirty Nigerian Man	
2006	30 Days	Kene Alumona (as C.B.A.)	
2008	Spy Games: A Private Visit	FBI Agent	TV movie
2008	Mama's Great Love (short)	Thompson	Short film, also director, writer, and executive producer
2011	Paparazzi: Eye in the Dark	Det. Davis	Mystery
2011	Tobi		with Jimmy Allen
2012	Unwanted Guest	Ike	Drama
2012	Bianca	Attah	with Van Vicker
2013	On Bended Knees	Ebube	Drama
2014	Unguarded	Mr. Cool	Drama
2014	Busted Life	Femi	Drama
2016	New Girl	Service Guy	Episode: "Jeff Day"
2016	Witch Hunt	Baba	Short film
2016	Castor Oil	Pastor	Short film
2017	Scrimmage	Coach Cassidy	Short film
2018	How to Get Away with Murder	Marshal of the Court	Episode: "Lahey v. Commonwealth of Pennsylvania"
2018	Scorpion	Sami	Episode: "A Lie in the Sand"
2018	The Affair	Guard	1 episode
2018	Thriller	Mr. Reynolds	Crime / Drama / Horror / Mystery
2018	Moving On	Father Fred	Short film
2019	Heaven's Hell	Jefferson Aliu	Drama
2021	Snowfall	Guard	Episode: "The Get Back"
2021	Bob Hearts Abishola	Babalawo	Episode: "Light Duty"
2021–present	Tyler Perry's Assisted Living	Efe Omowale	Main role (season 2–present)
2023	Captain Fall	Goodluck	Voice

== Awards and nominations ==
Africa Movie Academy Awards
Year	Nominated work	Category	Result
2012	Unwanted Guest	Best Actor in a leading Role	Nominated

Best of Nollywood Awards
Year	Nominated work	Category	Result
2013	Bended Knees	Best Supporting Actor in an English film	Nominated

Golden Icons Academy Movie Awards
Year	Nominated work	Category	Result
2012	Bianca	Best Actor – Diaspora	Won

Nigeria Entertainment Awards
Year	Nominated work	Category	Result
2011	Tobi	Best Actor In A Film/Short Story	Nominated
2012	Unwanted Guest	Best Actor in a Film	Nominated

=== Other awards ===
- 1997 AUDELCO Award nominee: Best Performance in a Musical – Male, Chap Am So: The Amistad Story
- 2006 'VIV' AUDELCO Award winner: Best Ensemble, REAL Black Men Don't Sit Cross-Legged on the Floor: A Collage in Blues
- 2011 Nollywood and African Film Critics Awards (NAFCA) winner: Best Actor in a Supporting Role – Diaspora, Paparazzi: Eye in the Dark
- 2012 Nollywood and African Film Critics Awards (NAFCA) winner: Best Actor – Diaspora, Unwanted Guest
- 2014 Nollywood and African Film Critics Awards (NAFCA) nominee: Best Actor in a Supporting Role – Diaspora, When One Door Closes

== See also ==
- List of Nigerian film producers
- List of Nigerian actors
- List of Nigerian Americans
