= Nadia Buari =

Ghanaian actress

- Born: 21 November 1982 (age 43); Sekondi-Takoradi, Ghana
- Education: University of Ghana
- Occupations: Actress; business; former model
- Years active: 2005–present
- Children: 4
- Awards: Special Recognition Award at Africa Magic Viewers Choice Awards, 2014

Nadia Buari (born November 21, 1982) is a Ghanaian actress. She received two nominations for Best Actress in a Leading Role at the Africa Movie Academy Awards in 2009.

== Early life ==
Nadia Buari was born in the oil city of Ghana, Sekondi-Takoradi to a Ghanaian father, Sidiku Buari and a Ghanaian mother of 5 children, Two sets of twins and a single birth which was her fifth. She attended Mfantsiman Girls' Senior High School in the Central Region and then studied Performing Arts at the University of Ghana. She graduated with a Bachelor of Fine Arts (BFA degree). Throughout her time at the University of Ghana, she was actively involved in drama and dance clubs.

== Career ==
Nadia Buari premiered on Ghanaian national television with the TV series Games People Play in late 2005. Her first major film was Mummy's Daughter, after which, she starred in Beyonce: The President's Daughter. Her role as "Beyonce" was her major breakthrough. Her movie career began with her playing a role in the TV series "Games People Play" in 2005, which she got nominated for best actress. She has starred in more than 20 movies.

In 2013, she came out with her own movie called "The Diary of Imogene Brown".

The celebrated Actress for the first time acted alongside Ghanaian Kumawood actress and TV personality, Nana Ama McBrown in movie called "Coming Africa: Welcome to Ghana in 2023."

=== Nollywood breakthrough and success ===
Buari moved from Ghanaian films to Nollywood films around the year 2008. Her breakthrough role in Nollywood was in the film Beyonce & Rihanna as Beyonce alongside Nollywood actress Omotola Jalade Ekeinde who played Rihanna. The film became very popular to both Ghanaian and Nigerian audience. Her other notable Nollywood films include Rough Rider, Beauty and the Beast, Holding Hope and Single and Married.

She is also known for co-starring in films with Nollywood actor Jim Iyke, which has also received attention. Films include the Beyonce & Rihanna film series, Hot Romance and Behind a Smile.

In 2013, she won the Pan African Actress award at the annual Nigerian Entertainment Awards (NEA Awards) in New York City.

=== Other work ===
Buari became an ambassador at Tablet India Limited (TIL) in 2013.

== Personal life ==
In 2019, Buari revealed in an interview that she is married and has four children. Her siblings are Malik Buari, Ayisha Buari, Shaida Buari, Jameel Buari and Jeed Rogers. Her parents are Sidiku Buari and Hajia Buari.

In a July 2023 interview on Citi TV, she shared that she would have put her career on hold if not for her mother whilst talking about juggling her duties as mother and actress.

== Recognitions ==
In 2014, Buari was awarded the Special Recognition Award at Africa Magic Viewers' Choice Awards.

In 2015 and 2019, she was nominated for the Best Actress in a leading role for her performances in Diary of Imogen Brown and Getting Married respectively.

Buari was nominated for the Best Performance By An Actress In A Leading Role during the Ghana Movie Awards 2021, which she won jointly with Jasmine Baroudi

== Filmography ==
- Beyoncé — The President Daughter (2006) as Beyonce Bill
- The Return of Beyoncé (2006) as Beyonce
- Mummy's Daughter (2006)
- Darkness of Sorrow (2006) as Kayla
- Slave to Lust (2007)
- In The Eyes of My Husband (2007) as Jasmine
- American Boy (2007)
- Wicked Intentions (2008) as Kamsi
- Tomorrow Must Wait (2008) as Nelly
- Hidden Treasure (2008) as Liza
- Beyonce & Rihanna
- Beauty and the Beast (2008)
- My Last Ambition (2009) as Nelly
- Love, Lies and Murder (2009) as Jane
- Secret Lie
- The Angle Against The Monster
- Heartless
- Last Hour Romance
- Under My Pillow (2011)
- Speechless
- Desperate Bride
- Innocent Sin
- Guilty Threat
- The Golden Lady
- Satanic Kingdom
- Rough Rider
- Crazy Scandal
- Unfaithful
- The Monster In Me
- Bad Egg
- Garden of Eden
- No More Love
- My Dove
- Agony of Christ (2008)
- Heart of Men (2009) as Sylvia
- Forbidden Fruit (2009)
- Holding Hope (2010) as Sabina
- Chelsea (2010) as Chelsea
- Checkmate (2010) as Caroline
- Single and Married (2012) as Paula
- Heroes & Zeros (2012) as Tonia Amabibi
- Game Plan (2015)
- American Driver (2017)
- African Messiah (2021)
- Coming to Africa: Welcome to Ghana (2023)
- Deranged
