= Michael Blackson =

Ghanaian actor and comedian (born 1972)

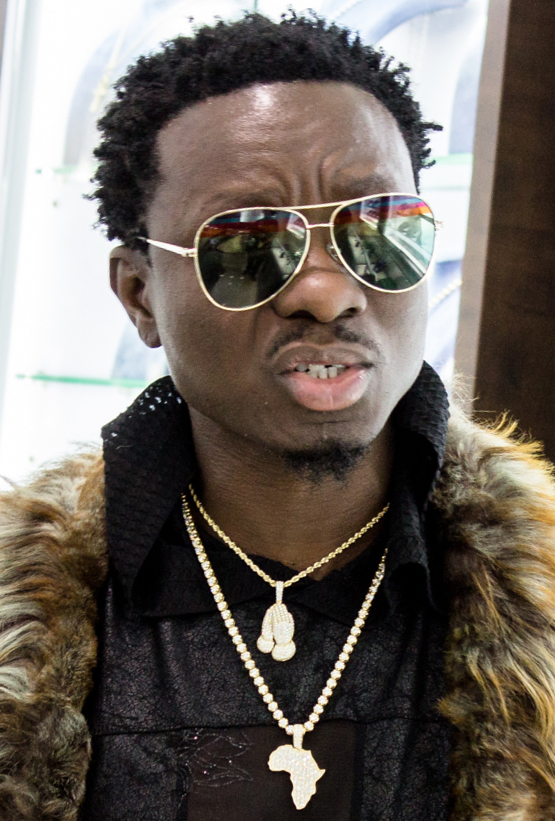
- Blackson in 2019
- Born: Jafari Ferguson; November 28, 1972 (age 53); Accra, Ghana
- Occupations: Actor, comedian, rapper, songwriter, record producer
- Years active: 2000–present
- Children: 3
- Relatives: Eli Apple (nephew)
- Website: michaelblacksonfoundation.org

Michael Kojo Blackson (born Jafari Ferguson; November 28, 1972) is a Ghanaian-American actor and comedian.

== Career ==
In 2005, Blackson released a comedy sketch CD entitled Modasucka: Welcome to America. Also in 2005, he made an appearance on the TV series 30 Rock, P. Diddy Presents: The Bad Boys of Comedy on HBO, and starred in a commercial for Chappelle's Show on Comedy Central.

In 2011, Blackson appeared on Starz's Martin Lawrence Presents: 1st Amendment Stand-Up and Showtime's Shaquille O'Neal Presents All Star Comedy Jam.

In 2019, Blackson appeared in the "Wakonda" official music video by Akon.

== Personal life ==
On July 31, 2021, Blackson proposed to his girlfriend, Rada Darling, during a radio interview on The Breakfast Club. They continue to be together as partners. On November 24, 2021, he became a U.S citizen. Blackson is the uncle of San Francisco 49ers cornerback Eli Apple. As part of his work in philanthropy he built a school in Ghana that was commissioned in early January 2023. The school is located at Agona Nsaba in the Agona East District of Ghana’s Central Region, where he grew up.

In 2025, he announced his split from fiancée Rada Darling after welcoming a son Kweku Blackson with reality star Nadia Beddini.
He's currently dating Love & Hip Hop: Miami co star Gaelle "Heaven" Jacquees and In Fall 2026 her announced pregnancy.

== Filmography ==
=== Film ===
| Year | Title | Role | Notes |
|---|---|---|---|
| 2000 | Next Friday | Customer #1 | |
| 2006 | Repos | Coffee | Video |
| 2006 | The Last Stand | Comic #6 | |
| 2007 | The Savages | Howard | |
| 2007 | Black Supaman | Akon | Video |
| 2007 | Banana Leaves | Chuks | |
| 2007 | You're Triflin | Michael the Comedian | Video |
| 2008 | Internet Dating | Akeem the Dream | Video |
| 2009 | The Mail Man | Mohammed | |
| 2009 | What We Do | Taxi Cab Driver | Video |
| 2010 | My American Nurse 2 | Freddie | |
| 2010 | Ex$pendable | - | Video |
| 2011 | Threading Needles | Landlord | |
| 2012 | In Sickness and in Health | Yusuf | TV movie |
| 2013 | One Night in Vegas | Mr. Roland | |
| 2013 | Coffin Dodgers | (Voice) | Short |
| 2013 | Mutumbo the Lost Prince | Mutumbo | Directed by Leevon Daniels |
| 2014 | Kony Montana | Kony Montana | Comedy |
| 2015 | Tooken | Fake Akon | Also starring: Reno Wilson, Lauren Stamile, Lee Tergesen |
| 2015 | More Money, More Family | Bootleg | Comedy |
| 2016 | Meet the Blacks | Mr. Wooky | Comedy/Horror |
| 2018 | Easy Money | Caine | Action |
| 2018 | The Stuff | Security Guard | Action/Comedy/Drama |
| 2018 | Nobody's Fool | Thug | Comedy/Drama/Romance |
| 2018 | Got My Hustle Up | Michael | Also starring: Thou Brown, Darnae Hill, Bambi Johnson |
| 2018 | Sliders | Caine | Also starring: Ron Byrd, Philla Brougham |
| 2019 | Angel and the Mailman | Akin | Drama |
| 2019 | I Got The Hook Up 2 | Officer Midnight | Comedy |
| 2019 | The Lick Movie | Kofi | Action/Crime/Drama |
| 2020 | American Dream | John | Drama |
| 2021 | Coming 2 America | Nexdorian Lieutenant | Also starring: Eddie Murphy, Arsenio Hall, Shari Headley |
| 2021 | Someday Isles | Principal | Action/Comedy/Drama |
| 2021 | The House Next Door: Meet the Blacks 2 | Mr. Wooky | Also starring: Mike Epps, Katt Williams, Lil Duval |

=== Television ===
| Year | Title | Role | Notes |
|---|---|---|---|
| 1995 | Snaps | Himself | Episode: "Episode #1.1" |
| 2000 | ComicView | Himself | Episode: "ComicView: New Orleans Party Gras" |
| 2005 | The Bad Boys of Comedy | Himself | Episode: "Episode #1.6" |
| 2006 | 30 Rock | African Man | Episode: "Jack Meets Dennis" |
| 2008 | ComicView | Himself | Episode: "ComicView: One Mic Stand" |
| 2009 | 1st Amendment Stand Up | Himself | Episode: "Cortney Gee/Mark Viera/Ronnie Jordan/Michael Blackson" |
| 2011-12 | Are We There Yet? | Various Roles | Recurring Guest |
| 2014 | The Arsenio Hall Show | Himself | Episode: "Episode #1.145" |
| 2015 | In the Cut | Customer | Episode: "The Ball's in Your Court" |
| 2017 | 50 Central | African Traveler | Episode: "Amistad Travel Agency" |
| 2017-18 | Leave It to Stevie | Himself | Episode: "Standing Down" & "The Game of Faith" |
| 2017-19 | Wild 'N Out | Himself/Cast Member | Cast Member: Season 8 & 10 & 12 & 15 |
| 2017-19 | Hip Hop Squares | Himself/Panelist | Recurring Panelist |
| 2018 | BET Social Awards | Himself/Host | Main Host |
| 2018 | Love & Hip Hop: Atlanta | Himself | Episode: "I'm Telling" |
| 2018 | Rich Africans | Michael | Main Cast |
| 2019 | Hollywood and African Prestigious Awards | Himself/Host | Main Host |
| 2019 | Transitions | Kodjoe | Episode: "Nigerian Nightmare" |
| 2019 | Dr. Blackson | Dr. Blackson | Main Cast |
| 2020 | Casting One Mo' Chance | Himself/Judge | Main Judge: Season 1 |
| 2021 | VH1 Couples Retreat | Himself | Main Cast: Season 1 |
| 2021 | MTV Cribs | Himself | Episode: "Michael Blackson/Ashlee Simpson & Evan Ross/Johnny Weir" |
| 2022 | Sherman's Showcase | Fada | Episode: "Sherman From Africa: Live from Lagos" |
| 2023 | The Michael Blackson Show | Mr. Michael Blackson | Main Cast |
| 2025 | All's Fair | Bob Bishop | Guest appearance: Season 1, Episode 8: "Oh Jesus" |
| 2025—2026 | Love & Hip Hop: Miami | Himself | Main Cast: Season 7 |

=== Music Videos ===
| Year | Song | Artist |
|---|---|---|
| 2008 | "Dat Baby Don't Look Like Me" | Shawty Put featuring Lil Jon and Too Short |
| 2014 | "Sugar Daddy" | LeLe XO |
| 2020 | "Czar" | Busta Rhymes featuring M.O.P. |
