= Nollywood and African Film Critics Awards =

African annual film award

- Awarded for: Outstanding Achievement in African cinema
- Country: United States
- Presented by: Nollywood Film Critics USA
- First award: 2011
- Final award: 2016
- Website: www.africannafca.com

The Nollywood and African Film Critics Awards is a former movie award that rewards film practitioners in the African continent. It has been held in the United States since its maiden edition on September 17, 2011.

The 4th edition was held on 13 September 2014 at Saban Theatre, Beverly Hills, California.

The 2016 ceremony was held on November 19 at Alex Theatre, Glendale, California. Stephanie Okereke, Mike Ezuruonye and Obi Emelonye were among the winners.

== Categories ==
As at 2014, the following were the categories:

- Best Actor in a Leading Role
- Best Actress in a Leading Role
- Best Actor in a Supporting Role
- Best Actress in a Supporting Role
- Best Promising Actor in a Film
- Best Actress Foreign Film
- Best Child Actor in a Film
- Best Director
- Best Film
- Best Comedy
- Best Drama
- Best Sound
- Best Visual Effects
- Best Cinematography
- Best Editing
- Best Original Score
- Best Makeup
- Best Costume
- Best Indigenous Film
- Best Foreign Film
- Best Short Film/Trailer
- Best TV/Talk Show/Online Series

Diaspora Categories

- Best Diaspora Film
- Best Diaspora Drama
- Best Actor in a Leading Role in a Diaspora Film
- Best Actress in a Leading Role in a Diaspora Film
- Best Actor in a Supporting Role in a Diaspora Film
- Best Actress in a Supporting Role in a Diaspora Film
- Best Director
- Best Director Foreign Film
- Best Actor Foreign Film

People's Choice Categories

- Favorite Actor
- Favorite Actress
- Favorite Director
- Favorite Screenwriter
- Favorite Original Score
- Favorite Short Film/Trailer
- Best Promising Actor
- Artiste of the Year
- Song of the Year
- Best Docudrama
