= Short Waves Festival =

Polish film festival

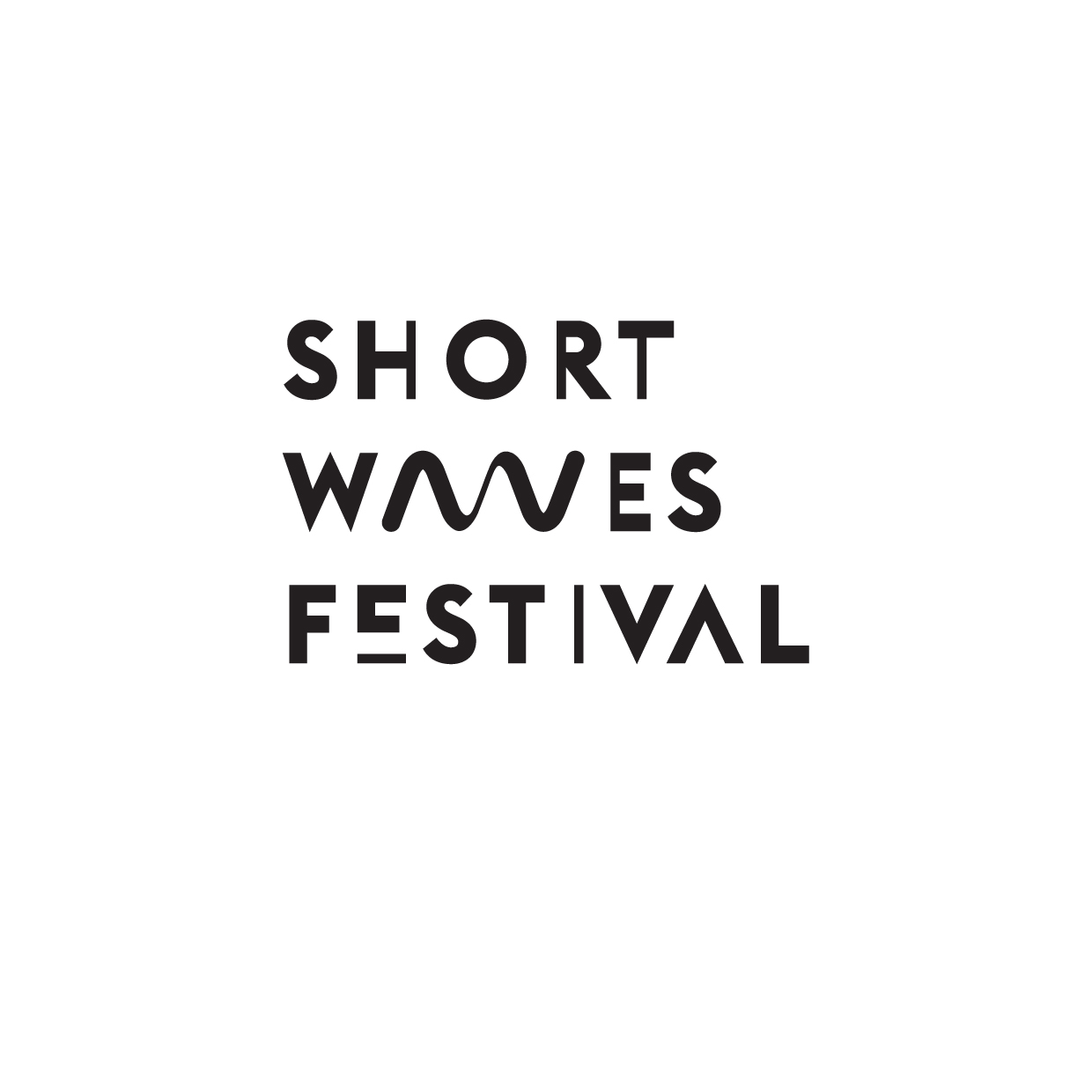
- Short Waves Festival logo
- Location: Poznań, Poland
- Founded: 2009
- Language: Polish; English
- Website: shortwaves.pl

Short Waves Festival is an annual international short film festival held in Poznań, Poland. Its main characteristic is inclusion of not only live-action, documentary and animated films, but also music videos, experimental films and video-art. It is one of the main events of its kind in Poland. The event's slogan hails it as "the most concise short film festival".

== History ==
Since its commencement, the festival is organized by the Ad Arte Foundation from Poznań. Short Waves started as a multi-location event held simultaneously in various cities. The first edition in 2009 encompassed 28 locations in Poland, as well as Berlin, London and Dublin. Twelve Polish short films were screened in every city and the viewers voted for their favorite. The winner was chosen by counting the total number of votes from all the locations. In the next years the number of participating cities and countries increased. The record 2015 edition had more than 90 towns on 6 continents. Both the 2014 and 2015 editions consisted of two parts: Grand Prix Tour continued the tradition of organizing screenings around the globe, and Short Waves Poznań was a stationery version of the festival, with numerous screenings and events added. International competition was introduced next to the Polish one. The 2016 edition was the last to include the multiple location tour. Since then, the festival is held exclusively in Poznań and its multi-city incarnation is abandoned. The festival in its new format began to flourish with multiple new screening sections and competitions (such as Poznań Open, Dances with Camera, Urban View, Best of Seven), specialized workshops (for example movie poster making), discussion panels and other industry events.

== Awarded films ==
=== 2009 ===
- Audience Grand Prix Award: MYJNIA (Carwash), Jan P. Matuszyński
- Future Shorts Award: ZIĘTEK, Bartosz Blaschke
- Special Award: FILM O KOSTUCHU, Piotr Bosacki

=== 2010 ===
- Audience Grand Prix Award: BRZYDKIE SŁOWA (Bad Lyrics), Marcin Maziarzewski
- Szczecin Wave Award: SZCZĘŚCIARZE, Tomasz Wolski

=== 2011 ===
- Audience Grand Prix Award: DRAKULA, Piotr Bosacki
- Short Waves Pro Award: PRZEZ SZYBĘ (Through Glass), Igor Chojna

=== 2012 ===
- Grand Prix Audience Award: NOISE, Katarzyna Kijek & Przemysław Adamski
- Short Waves Pro Award: NOISE, Katarzyna Kijek & Przemysław Adamski

=== 2013 ===
- Short Waves Pro Award: THE GUARDIANS, Krzysztof Szota
- Audience Award: THE GOVERNANCE OF LOVE, Adela Kaczmarek

=== 2014 ===
- Grand Prix: OUR CURSE, Tomasz Śliwiński
- Poznan Open I award: KILLING AUNTIE, Mateusz Głowacki
- Poznan Open II award: SHAME, Karma Fryc
- Poznan Open III award: LUKE AND LOTTA, Renata Gąsiorowska
- Poznan Open Audience Award: SURVEY ABOUT WOMEN, Mateusz Głowacki
- Dances with Camera: WASHED, Daphna Mero

=== 2015 ===
- Grand Prix Tour: THAT WOULD BE BEAUTIFUL, Anna Morawiec
- Poznan Open I award: HOME, Agnieszka Borowa
- Poznan Open II award: MILKY BROTHER, Vahram Mkhitaryan
- Poznan Open III award: INVISIBLE, Zofia Pręgowska
- Poznan Open Special Jury Award: UNWANTED DESIRES, Ola Szmida
- Urban View I award: ALBERDI’S HEROES, Andres Grabois
- Urban View II award: A PASSENGER STREAM, Anna Dranitsyna
- Urban View III award: DISPLACEMENTS, Manuel Alvarez Diestro
- Dances with Camera I award: BEATING, Kari Sulc, Tereza Hradilkova
- Dances with Camera II award: WANNABE, Jessica Taylor
- Dances with Camera III award: OFF GROUND, Boudewijn Koole & Jakop Ahlbom
- Best of Seven: CAMBODIA 2099, Davy Chou

=== 2016 ===
- Poznan Open I award: EDMOND, Nina Gantz
- Poznan Open II award: RAISA, Pavel Cuzuioc
- Poznan Open III award: END OF THE WORLD, Monika Pawluczuk
- Best of Seven I award: OBJECT, Paulina Skibińska
- Best of Seven Audience Award: GRANDMA'S DAY, Miłosz Sakowski
- Dances with Camera I award: GONE, Helena Jónsdóttir & Vera Sölvadóttir
- Dances with Camera II award: LAY ME LOW, Marlene Millar
- Dances with Camera III award: HOME ALONE, Adi Halfin

=== 2017 ===
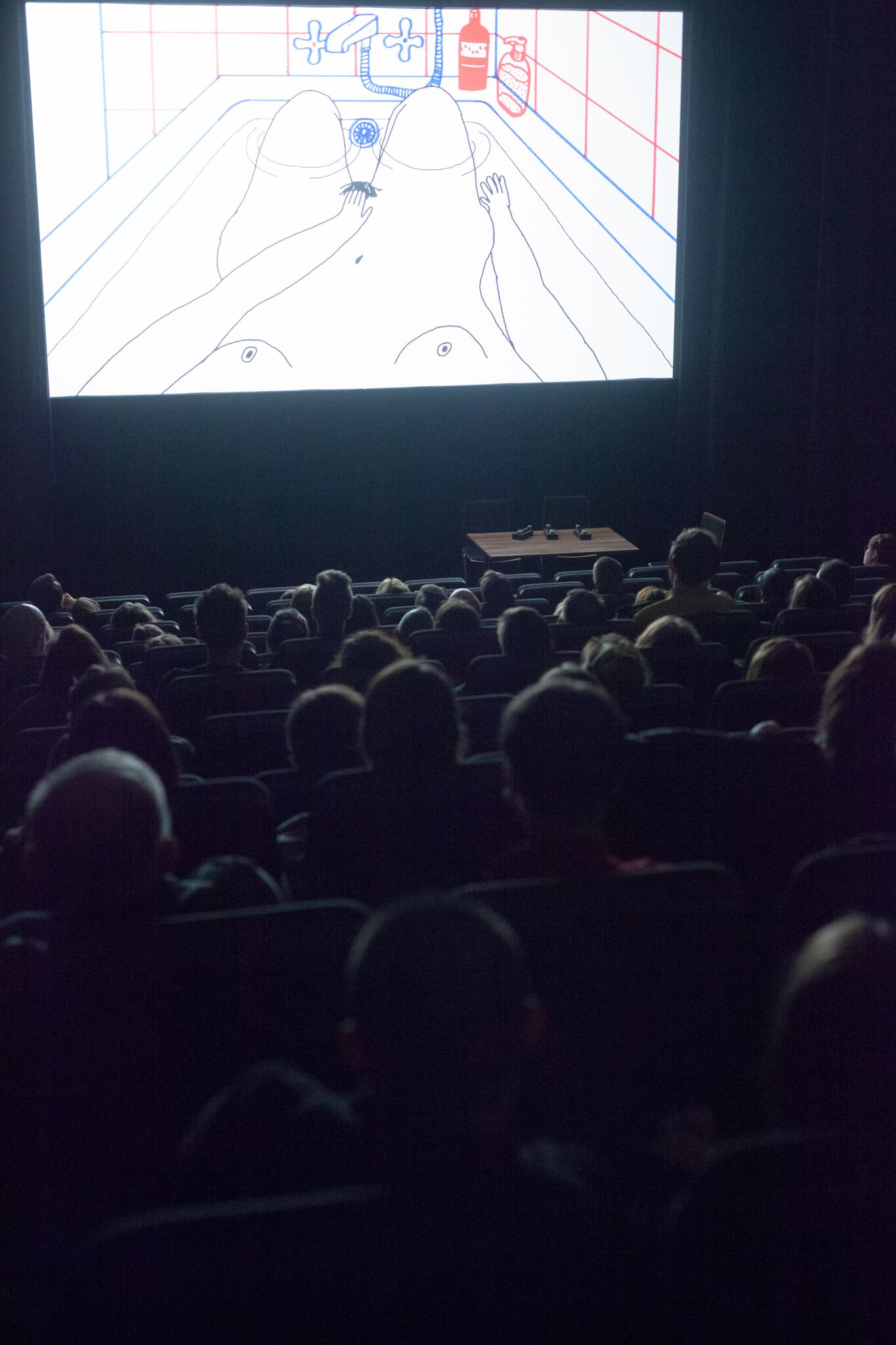
A screening during Short Waves Festival

- Polish Competition I award: EDUCATION, Emi Buchwald
- Polish Competition II award: LEAVEN, Artur Hanaj
- Polish Competition III award: POLONAISE, Agnieszka Elbanowska
- Polish Competition Honourable mention: CLOSE TIES, Zofia Kowalewska
- Polish Competition Audience award: CLOSE TIES, Zofia Kowalewska
- International Competition I award: DECORADO, Alberto Vázquez, Spain
- International Competition II award: THE MANLIEST MAN, Anuj Gulatii, India
- International Competition III award: WORLD WAR CUP, Simon Ellis, UK
- International Competition Honourable mention: IN THE DISTANCE, Florian Grolig, Germany
- International Competition Audience award: FLOR DE MIL COLORES, Karen Vazquez Guadarrama, Belgium
- Dances with Camera I award: TOURNURES (Twist), Sebastien de Buyl, Belgium
- Dances with Camera II award: TACT, Thibaud Le Maguer, France
- Dances with Camera III award: NEANTS, Nellie Carrier, Canada
- Dances with Camera Honourable mention: TO THE ENDS OF FINGERTIPS, Roswitha Chesher, UK
- Dances with Camera Audience award: THROUGH MY STREET, Piet Baumgartner, Switzerland
- Unxpctd.mov I award: SHE WHOSE BLOOD IS CLOTTING IN MY UNDERWEAR, Vika Kirchenbauer, Germany
- Unxpctd.mov II award: SOMETHING ABOUT SILENCE, Patrick Buhr, Germany
- Unxpctd.mov III award: NOT EVEN NOTHING CAN BE FREE OF GHOSTS, Rainer Kohlberger, Germany/Austria
- Unxpctd.mov Honourable mention: HOTARU, William Laboury, France
- Unxpctd.mov Audience award: HOTARU, William Laboury, France

=== 2018 ===
- International Competition I Award: The Beast, Samantha Nell, Michael Wahrmann, Brazil/France/South Africa 2016
- International Competition II Award: Retouch, Kaveh Mazaheri, Iran 2017
- International Competition III Award: Après le volcan (After the Volcano), Léo Favier, France 2016
- International Competition Honourable Mention: for music composer Simon Smith; Contact, Alessandro Novelli, Spain 2017
- International Competition Audience Award: And So We Put Goldfish In The Pool, Makoto Nagahisa, Japan 2016
- Polish Competition I Award: Nic nowego pod słońcem (Nothing New under the Sun), Damian Kocur, Poland 2017
- Polish Competition II Award: Heimat, Emi Buchwald, Poland 2017
- Polish Competition III Award: Proch (Dust), Jakub Radej, Poland 2016
- Polish Competition Audience Award: Fusy (Dregs), Kordian Kądziela, Poland 2017
- Best of Ten: Min Börda (The Burden), Niki Lindroth von Bahr, Sweden 2017
- Urban View I Award: Nature: All Rights Reserved, Sebastian Mulder, The Netherlands 2016
- Urban View II Award: Leninopad (The Fall of Lenin), Svitlana Shymko, Ukraine 2017
- Urban View III Award: Livorno 32, Miki Polonski, Israel 2017
- Urban View Honourable Mention: Tshweesh (Disruption), Feyrouz Serhal, Lebanon 2017
- Urban View Audience Award: Nature: All Rights Reserved, Sebastian Mulder, The Netherlands 2016
- Dances with Camera I Award: Skuggdjur (Shadow Animals), Jerry Carlsson, Sweden 2017
- Dances with Camera II Award: Cargo, Jasmine Ellis, Germany 2017
- Dances with Camera III Award: Six Solos, Simon Fildes, UK 2016
- Dances with Camera Honourable Mention: Kâbus, Alice Fargier, France 2017
- Dances with Camera Honourable Mention: Bhairava, Marlene Millar, Phillip Szporer, Canada 2017
- Dances with Camera Audience Award: Bhairava, Marlene Millar, Phillip Szporer, Canada 2017

=== 2019 ===
- International Competition I Award: Déploiements (Deployments), dir. Stéphanie Lagarde, France/Netherlands 2018
- International Competition II Award: Câm Lặng (The Mute), dir. An Pham Thien, USA/Vietnam 2018
- International Competition III Award: Gardhi (Fence), dir. Lendita Zeqiraj, Kosovo/Croatia/France 2018
- International Competition Audience Award: Tungrus, dir. Rushi Chandna, India 2017
- Polish Competition I Award: Gość (The Guest), dir. Sebastian Weber, Poland 2018
- Polish Competition II Award: Jestem synem górnika (I am a Miner’s Son), dir. Michał Soja & Róża Duda, Poland 2018
- Polish Competition III Award: O Jezu! (Oh, God!), dir. Betina Bożek, Poland 2017
- Polish Competition Audience Award: Siostry (The Sisters), reż. Michał Hytroś, Poland 2017
- Dances with Camera I Award: Sisters, dir. Daphne Lucker, Netherlands 2018
- Dances with Camera II Award: Competing for Sunlight: Ash, dir. Dagmar Dachauer, Austria 2017
- Dances with Camera III Award: Altera, dir. Baptiste Rouveure, France 2018
- Dances with Camera Audience Award: Sisters, dir. Daphne Lucker, Netherlands 2018
- Urban View Audience Award: Operation Jane Walk, dir. Robin Klengel & Leonhard Müllner, Austria 2018
