= Africa Movie Academy Award for Best Film by an African Living Abroad =

The Africa Movie Academy Award for Best Film by an African Living Abroad was an annual merit by the Africa Film Academy to reward the African filmmakers in the diaspora. The category was introduced in 2008 as Best Film African Diaspora and was cancelled after the 9th Africa Movie Academy Awards.

Best Film by an African Living Abroad
Year	Film	Director	Result
2008	Through the Fire		Nominated
2008	Bleeding Rose		Nominated
2010	Soul Diaspora		Won
2010	Okra Principle		Nominated
2010	China Wahala		Nominated
2010	Crunch		Nominated
2011	In America: The Story of the Soul Sisters	Rahman Oladigbolu	Won
2011	Anchor Baby	Lonzo Nzekwe	Nominated
2011	Mirror Boy	Obi Emelonye	Nominated
2011	Africa United	Debs Gardner-Brook	Nominated
2012	Housemates		Won
2012	Mystery Of Birds		Nominated
2012	Ben Kross		Nominated
2012	Paparazzi: Eye in the Dark		Nominated
2013	Last Flight to Abuja		Won
2013	Turning Point		Nominated
2013	The Assassin's Practice		Nominated
2013	Bianca		Nominated
2013	Woolwich Boys		Nominated
2015	Fevers		Won
2015	Gone Too Far		Nominated
2015	Thorns of Roses (O Esphinho Da Rosa)		Nominated
2015	Affairs of the Heart		Nominated
2016	Lambadina		Won
2016	Skinned		Nominated
2016	LAPD African Cop		Nominated
2016	Boxing Day		Nominated
2016	MONA		Nominated
2017	While We Live		Won
2017	Saving Dreams		Nominated
2017	Theory of Conflict		Nominated
2017	A Mile in My Shoes		Nominated
2017	Hell’s Fury		Nominated
2018	Alexandra		Won
2018	Minister		Nominated
2018	Low Lifes And High Hopes		Nominated
2019	Rattlesnakes	Julius Amedume	Won
2019	Lara and the Beat	Tosin Coker	Nominated
2019	Makeroom	Robert O. Peters	Nominated
2020	No Shade	Clare Anyiam-Osigwe	Won
2020	Eagles’ Nest	Olivier Assoua	Nominated
2020	2 Weeks in Lagos	Kathryn Fasegha	Nominated
2020	Idemuza	Aloaye Omoake	Nominated
2020	Between	Daniel Adenimokan	Nominated
2021	Blackmail	Obi Emelonye	Won
2021	First Call	Angela Onuora	Nominated
2021	K.I.A.B	Eric Zoa&Oleksii Osyka	Nominated
2021	Gone	Daniel Ademinokan	Nominated
