= Maami =

2011 Nigerian drama film

- Theatrical release poster
- Directed by: Tunde Kelani
- Screenplay by: Tunde Babalola
- Based on: Maami by Femi Osofisan
- Produced by: Tunde Kelani
- Starring: Funke Akindele; Wole Ojo; Olumide Bakare
- Cinematography: Sharafa Abagun
- Edited by: Kazeem Agboola; Hakeem Olowookere
- Music by: Adesiji Awoyinka
- Production companies: Mainframe Film and Television Productions
- Distributed by: Mainframe Pictures; Blue Pictures
- Release dates: 4 June 2011 (premiere); 3 February 2012 (Nigeria)
- Running time: 93 minutes
- Country: Nigeria
- Languages: Yoruba; English
- Budget: ₦30 million
- Box office: ₦11,928,600

Maami (/ˈmɑːmi/, transl. My Mother) is a 2011 Nigerian drama film produced and directed by Tunde Kelani. It is based on a novel of the same name, written by Femi Osofisan, and adapted to screen by Tunde Babalola. It stars Funke Akindele as Maami, along with Wole Ojo and Olumide Bakare. Though the film was a commercial failure, it was generally met with positive critical reviews.

The film which is set two days before the 2010 World Cup tells the story of Kashimawo (Wole Ojo), an international soccer player as he comes to terms with his painful childhood, reflecting on his mother's love for him in the midst of poverty and deprivation, and his estranged father. The film received four nominations at the 7th Africa Movie Academy Awards; including Best Nigerian Film, Achievement in Cinematography, Best Production Design and Best Child Actor.

== Cast ==
- Funke Akindele as Maami
- Wole Ojo as Kashimawo
- Ayomide Abatti as Young Kashimawo
- Tamilore Kuboye as Dolapo
- Olumide Bakare as Otunba Bamisaye
- Godwin Enakhena as Sports presenter
- Sanya Gold as Mr. Ojo
- Peter Badejo as NFF secretary
- Yinka Davies as Singer
- Fatai Rolling Dollar as Musician

The film features special guest appearances from Yinka Davies, Kayode Balogun, Fatai Rolling Dollar, and Biodun Kupoluyi.

== Release ==
The film's official trailer was released on 18 November 2011, a theatrical promotional poster was also unveiled on 30 January 2012. The film premiered on 4 June 2011 at the Muson centre, Lagos and had the Governor of Lagos State; Babatunde Fashola in attendance. It was also screened on 13 June 2011 at Fountain Hotel, Ado-Ekiti in commemoration of June 12. It was screened in film festivals, before it went on general theatrical release on 3 February 2012.

== Reception ==
=== Critical reception ===
The film was met with generally positive critical reviews, mostly due to its powerful story and themes. Nollywood Reinvented gave it 75%, praised the realness of the story, Funke Akindele's performance and noted the film for having memorable quotes and powerful themes. It concluded by stating: "there were a couple weak actors here and there, the story doesn’t strike you as ‘great’ from the beginning but it picks up pace, there are a lot of moments in this movie that are very endearing, you get the feeling that something’s missing in the movie but overall Maami was a simple delight to watch".

The Africa Channel comments: "Any film that starts with a cacophony of vuvuzelas is unlikely to hold subtlety as a core value, and Maami certainly lives up to the reputation of bold filmmaking that Kelani is celebrated for. The plot is engaging and at points disturbing, fraught with theft, emotional blackmail and trickery".

Gbenga Adeniji of The Punch comments: "Maami is a moving story which bares it all, yet allows viewers to expand their imagination and engage in sober reflection. It is humorous, meditative and pure. Kelani’s style of movie production salutes the past, recognizes the present and captures the future".

Beatriz Leal Riesco of Okay Africa concluded: "This screen adaptation of Femi Osofisan’s eponymous novel harnesses all the ingredients of the present-day Nigerian epic: witchcraft, melodrama, corruption, soccer, and love. With a complex cast of characters featuring top talents, Maami is a masterpiece of popular cinema, fruit both of Nollywood’s unique cinema industry and the inspired personality of its director, the internationally acclaimed Tunde Kelani".

Toni Kan of DStv feels the film would be much better as a linear narrative, he faulted Ayomide Abatti's performance and concluded: "Maami is a beautiful movie to watch. It is fast paced and the story grabs you from the very beginning and Kelani’s trademark cinematography shines through," the film exudes "strong messages for our times and Tunde Kelani passes it across beautifully".

Wilfred Okiche of YNaija concludes: "the overall experience is a superior one. It packs an emotional punch and you might just find yourself shedding a tear or two. We realize that good films cost money and have resigned ourselves to the product placements, but thankfully, they keep it tasteful and at a bare minimum here. It is not a perfect film but it is definitely one to watch".

9aijabooksandmovies gave 3 out of 5 stars and comments: "Maami is an emotionally intoxicating movie, where viewers are visually served with large pints of heart touching, tear jerking scenes, stemming from the unconditional love a poor mother has for her only son. It is a beautifully crafted story; Viewers swim laps in the pool of flash backs and stop intermittently to inhale fresh breaths of reality. Despite its short comings more on technical details, Maami is a must see movie and another good work from Mainframe productions".

Fola Akintomide comments: "Generally, the movie Maami successfully holds her audience bound with an amazing storyline, impressive technical display and exceptional performances by the actors; indeed once again, Nollywood veteran and multiple award winning Tunde Kelani stamped his name as one of the deserving icons in Africa".

The film however still wasn't received well by some critics. Amarachukwu Iwuala of The NET gave a mixed review, faulting the character development and concluded: "Obviously, Tunde Kelani, the award-winning Director of Oleku, Saworoide and Thunderbolt should have opted for a better adaptation of Maami, the novel by Femi Osofisan". Joseph Edgar of New Telegraph gave a negative review; although he commended the picture quality and Funke Akindele's performance, he panned everyother aspect of the film, commenting: "I watched Magun and could not leave my seat when the movie was over. What struck me after watching Maami was like a car crash. Apart from the cinematic quality which cannot be taken away from him [Kelani] every other thing was a wreck. The casting was below par, the scripting was hurried and it looked like something that was quickly put together." "I could honestly feel Funke trying to pull this Molue wreck out of the pits, the rest was just journey into the abyss of stupidity". Itunu of The Movie Pencil panned the film and concluded: "Overall, the storyline had no solid foundation and was indecisive". It was listed as one of the 100 greatest foreign-language films.

=== Box office ===
The film opened strongly at the theatres. However, earnings dropped considerably after the first week of release and the film was declared a commercial failure at the box office. Although the film was very popular at the time of its release, it did not translate to good business as it was heavily pirated.

=== Accolades ===
The film received four nominations at the 7th Africa Movie Academy Awards, including: Best Nigerian Film, Achievement in Cinematography, Best Production Design and Best Child Actor. It received six nominations at the 2013 Nollywood Movies Awards, including "Best Original Screenplay", "Best Actress in a Leading Role" for Akindele and "Best Indigenous Actor" for Wole Ojo; it won the award for "Best Indigenous Movie" and Akindele won "Best Indigenous Actress" award for her role. The film was also nominated for "Best Film Director" at the 2013 Nigeria Entertainment Awards. Maami also won awards at the 2013 Africa Magic Viewers Choice Awards and 2012 ZUMA Festival Awards.

Complete list of Awards
Award	Category	Recipients and nominees	Result
Africa Film Academy (7th Africa Movie Academy Awards)	Best Nigerian Film	Tunde Kelani	Nominated
Africa Film Academy (7th Africa Movie Academy Awards)	Achievement in Cinematography	Sharafa Abagun	Nominated
Africa Film Academy (7th Africa Movie Academy Awards)	Best Production Design		Nominated
Africa Film Academy (7th Africa Movie Academy Awards)	Best Child Actor	Ayomide Abatti	Nominated
Nollywood Movies Network (2013 Nollywood Movies Awards)	Best Actress in a Leading Role	Funke Akindele	Nominated
Nollywood Movies Network (2013 Nollywood Movies Awards)	Best Indigenous Actor	Wole Ojo	Nominated
Nollywood Movies Network (2013 Nollywood Movies Awards)	Best Indigenous Actress	Funke Akindele	Won
Nollywood Movies Network (2013 Nollywood Movies Awards)	Best Indigenous Movie	Tunde Kelani	Won
Nollywood Movies Network (2013 Nollywood Movies Awards)	Best Original Screenplay	Tunde Babalola	Nominated
Nollywood Movies Network (2013 Nollywood Movies Awards)	Best child Actor	Ayomide Abatti	Won
Nigeria Entertainment Awards (2013 Nigeria Entertainment Awards)	Best Film Director	Tunde Kelani	Nominated
Multichoice (2013 Africa Magic Viewers Choice Awards)	Best Actress in a Drama	Funke Akindele	Nominated
Multichoice (2013 Africa Magic Viewers Choice Awards)	Best Lighting Designer	Oluwole Olawoyin	Nominated
Multichoice (2013 Africa Magic Viewers Choice Awards)	Best Art Director	Bola Bello	Nominated
Multichoice (2013 Africa Magic Viewers Choice Awards)	Best Local Language Movie (Yoruba)	Tunde Kelani	Won
Multichoice (2013 Africa Magic Viewers Choice Awards)	Best Cinematographer	Sharafa Abagun	Nominated
ZUMA Film Festival; 2012 ZUMA Awards	Best Director	Tunde Kelani	Won
ZUMA Film Festival; 2012 ZUMA Awards	Best Nigerian Film	Tunde Kelani	Won
ZUMA Film Festival; 2012 ZUMA Awards	Best Actress	Funke Akindele	Won

== Home media ==
Maami was released on VOD on 5 June 2013 through Dobox TV. and was released on DVD by Ajimson company on 14 April 2014. New scenes were shot and added to the Extended edition DVD; According to Kelani, the scenes were present in the original script but he initially decided not to shoot them. The DVD was however heavily pirated in less than 48 hours of its release, leading to a huge loss for Mainframe Studios.
