= Cristina Flutur =

Romanian film and theatre actress

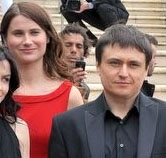
- Cristina Flutur and Cristian Mungiu (Cannes Film Festival 2012)
- Occupation: Actress
- Years active: 2004–present
- Known for: Beyond the Hills; Grain
- Awards: Cannes Film Festival Award for Best Actress

Cristina Flutur is a Romanian film and theatre actress.

In 2012 she made her debut in cinema, portraying the complex Alina Ringhis, main character in Cristian Mungiu's praised drama, Beyond the Hills. For her outstanding performance in this film she received the Best Actress Award at the 2012 Cannes Film Festival.

Before 2012, she performed for several years in theatre productions, both in Romania, on the stage of the Radu Stanca National Theatre in Sibiu, and abroad, when on tour with the ensemble.

== Biography ==
After finishing high school, Mathematics and Physics department, she decided to study Romanian and English languages and literature, along with American literature, at the Alexandru Ioan Cuza University in her hometown.

After graduating from her first faculty, she decided to get seriously into acting and became a student at the Babeș-Bolyai University in Cluj-Napoca.

== Artistic activity ==
=== Theatre ===
After finishing her studies at the drama department of Babeș-Bolyai University, she became an actress for the Radu Stanca National Theatre in Sibiu, Romania. Here she performed in many productions, both classical and modern, under the guidance of famous Romanian and foreign directors, such as Alexandru Dabija, Radu Alexandru Nica, Gavriil Pinte, Andrei Șerban, Vlad Massaci, Tompa Gabor, Silviu Purcărete, Rodica Radu, Alexander Hausvater, Adriana Popovici, Florin Zamfirescu, Robert Raponja.

During FITS, the Sibiu International Theatre Festival, she also played many roles in reading performances, recorded for the radio.

Theatre productions in Sibiu:

- "Platonov" by A. P. Chekhov, directed by Al. Dabija, role: Alexandra Ivanovna;
- "Time for Love, Time for Death" by Fritz Kater, directed by Radu Alexandru Nica, roles: a pupil, the teacher, the storyteller;
- "Turandot" adapted from Carlo Gozzi, directed by A. Zholdak, role: Turandot;
- "The Guide of a Regained Childhood", by Andrei Codrescu, directed by Gavriil Pinte, role: Dulcea;
- "Metamorphosis" adapted from Publius Ovidius Naso, directed by Silviu Purcarete, performance based on improvisations;
- "Love Factory" by Darko Lukic, directed by Robert Raponja, role: Marie Duplessis;
- "Life with an Idiot" adapted from Victor Erofeev, directed by A. Zholdak, role: The Wife;
- "Othello?!" adapted from William Shakespeare, directed by A. Zholdak, role: Desdemona;
- "Today Is No Smoking Day" by Iustin Panta, directed by Gavriil Pinte, role: Iustina;
- "The Seagull" by A. P. Chekhov, directed by Andrei Serban, role: Nina Zarechnaya;
- "Plasticine" by Vasili Sigariev, directed by Vlad Massaci, role: Spira;
- "Rhinoceros" by Eugène Ionesco, directed by Tompa Gabor, role: The Waitress;
- "Pantagruel's Sister-in-Law" adapted from Rabelais, directed by Silviu Purcarete, performance based on improvisations;
- "The Human Voice" by Jean Cocteau, directed by Rodica Radu, one-woman show;
- "Derby – an improvisation championship" directed by Alexander Hausvater, performance based on improvisations;
- "Sweet Thursday" adapted from John Steinbeck, directed by Adriana Popovici, role: Ida;
- "The Clouds", by Aristophanes, directed by Florin Zamfirescu.

Theatre performances in Bucharest:

- "Three Sisters", by A. P. Chekhov, directed by Gavriil Pinte, role: Masha, Radio drama for Radio România Cultural;
- "Konkurs", adapted from Al. Galin, directed by Emanuel Parvu, role: Nina Ionescu, Metropolis Theatre.

=== Film ===
In 2011 Cristina Flutur was called for an audition for a part in the new feature by the Romanian Golden Palm winner, Cristian Mungiu. After a few screen tests, she was offered one of the main roles, that of a troubled girl brought up in an orphanage, Alina Ringhis.

Acclaimed both by the critics and by the audience for her impeccable performance, she won the Best Actress Award at the Cannes Film Festival in 2012.

One year later, in 2013, Cristina Flutur started her first project in a foreign language, performing in French the role of Cristina Boico in the TV mini-series "Resistance". Cristina Boico was a Romanian Jewish woman who fought for the French Resistance during the Second World War. Produced by Alain Goldman, the producer of "La mome", the mini-series casts also Fanny Ardant, Richard Berry and Isabelle Nanty. It was broadcast in 2014 on TF1 (France) and RTS Un (Switzerland) and in 2015 on More4 (UK), being nominated in 2015 for Best TV movie at the Globes de Cristal Award.

In 2014 she started shooting for her first feature film in English, "Grain". The film is directed by the Turkish director Semih Kaplanoglu and it had its premiere in 2017 at the Sarajevo Film Festival. Later that year it won the Grand Prix at Tokyo International Film Festival.

=== Filmography ===
- 2022 - The Drone (Netherlands), experimental short film, director Rutger Wolfson
- 2022 - Gefilte Fish (Romania), feature film, director Andrei Cohn
- 2022 - Wait Two Days (Belgium/Romania), short film, director Jaro Minne
- 2022 - Une femme de notre temps (France), feature film, director Jean Paul Civeyrac
- 2020 - Villetta con ospiti (Italy), feature film, director Ivano De Matteo
- 2019 - Carturan (Romania), feature film, director Liviu Sandulescu
- 2019 - Backdraft II (USA), feature film, director Gonzalo López-Gallego
- 2018 - Cu unul în plus/Just One More (Romania), short film, director Valeriu Andriuta
- 2018 - Să nu ucizi/Thou Shalt Not Kill (Romania), feature film, directors Gabi Sarga & Catalin Rotaru
- 2018 - When I Die the World Ends (Sweden/Greece/Germany), short film, director Jennifer Rainsford
- 2017 - Hawaii (Romania), feature film, director Jesus del Cerro
- 2017 - Grain (film) (Turkey/Germany), feature film, director Semih Kaplanoğlu
- 2016 - Fragments of Gabi (Belgium/Romania), short film, director Jaro Minne
- 2015 - Raisa (Austria/Moldova/Romania), short film, director Pavel Cuzuioc
- 2014 - Resistance (France), TV mini-series (TF1, RTS Un & More4), directors David Delrieux & Miguel Courtois
- 2012 - Beyond the Hills (Romania/Belgium/France), feature film, director Cristian Mungiu

== Awards ==
- 2012 Best Actress Award - 2012 Cannes Film Festival, for the role Alina in "Beyond the Hills", directed by Cristian Mungiu;
- 2013 "Woman of the Year 2012", "Ambassador of the Romanian Art Abroad", offered by "Avantaje" magazine, Bucharest, Romania;
- 2017 Honorary Tribute Award - Aswan International Women Film Festival, Egypt;
- 2018 Nomination for Best Actress in a Leading Role - Romanian Gopo Awards, for the role Ioana in Hawaii, directed by Jesus del Cerro;
- 2018 Debut Award in Radio Drama for the role of Masha in "Three Sisters", a radio drama directed by Gavriil Pinte;
- 2010 Diploma for Excellency granted by the Ministry of Culture for her work on the stage of Radu Stanca National Theatre, Sibiu, Romania.
