= Yinka Davies =

Nigerian singer and dancer

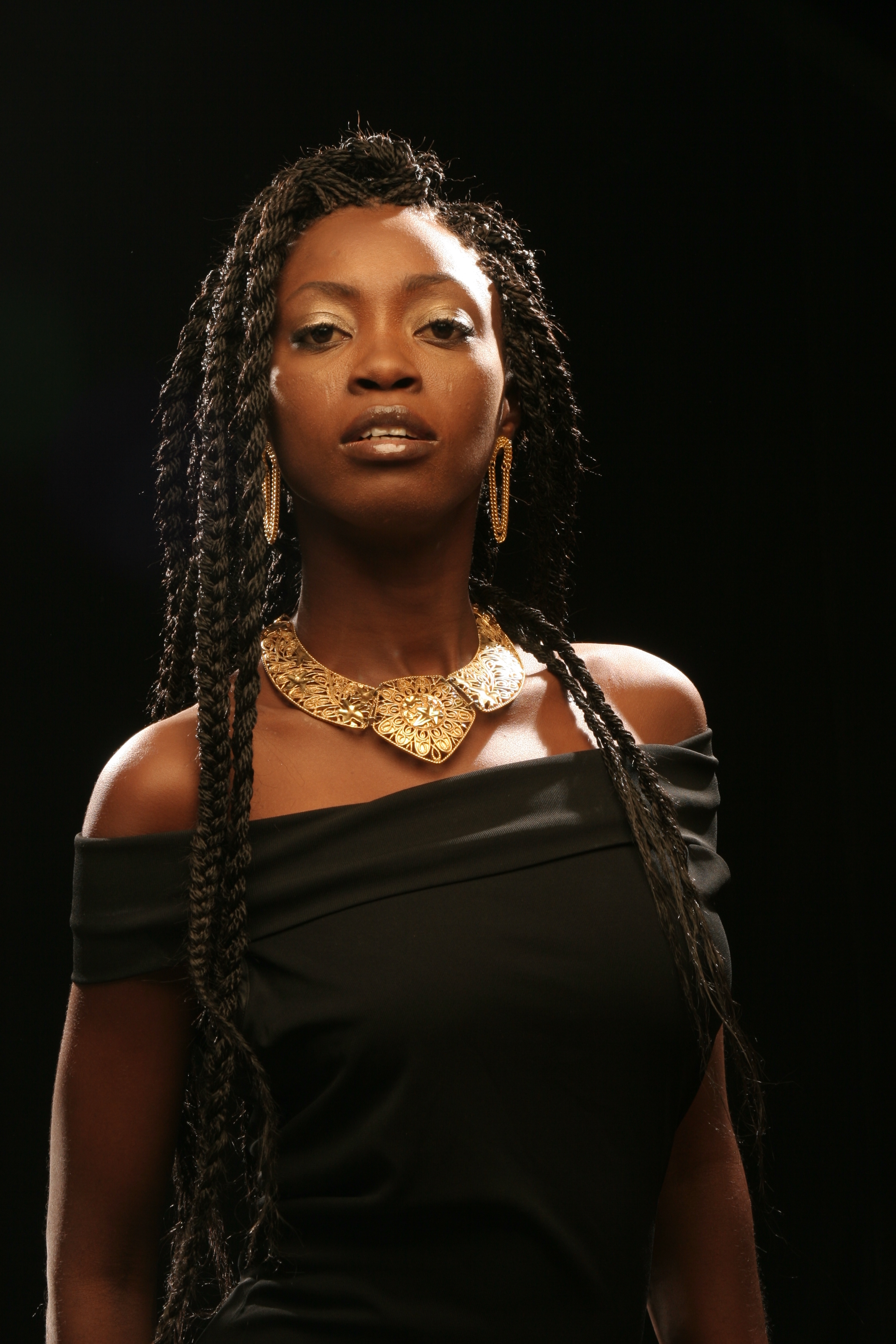

Background information
- Born: Yinka Davies; July 16, 1970 (age 56)
- Origin: Benin /Sierra Leone
- Genres: Afrobeat, jazz
- Occupations: Singer; songwriter; reality television judge; actress; dancer
- Instrument: vocals
- Years active: 2000–present
- Label: EniObanke
- Website: yinkadavies.com

Yinka Davies (born July 16, 1970) is a Nigerian singer, dancer, lyricist, vocalist and judge of reality show and Nigerian Idol.

== Background information ==
Father – Benin Republic/Sierra Leone Lisabi clan who moved to Lagos because he was originally from Nigeria.

Mother – from Ikorodu, Lagos State.

Paternal grandmother – from the Shagamu royal family.

Having grown up to the sounds of Sam Cooke, Johnny Cash, Elvis and Jimmy Dean and the sounds of her father playing on his guitar, Davies musical influences are heavily rooted in Jazz and Blues.

As Davies grew older in the 1970s and 1980s the radio at her grandmother's house was always tuned to Radio Lagos which played a variety of African music from Manu Dibango (Cameroun – Makossa), Mmaman Shatta (traditional Northern Nigerian musician), Dan Maria Jos (Northern Nigeria), Orlando Julius (southern Nigeria – highlife), Hadjia Funtua (northern Nigeria), Victor Uwaifo (southern Nigeria – Joromi), Fela (southern Nigeria – Afrobeat) to mention few.

She also remembers watching the late TV personality Art Alade (father of Dare Art-Alade) who had a popular television program called the Bar Beach Show featuring various musicians as well as his own resident band. It became obvious to Yinka that there was a lack of female musicians – in the 1980s she listened to Salawa Abeni (Yoruba) and Dora Ifudu (popular musician in RnB genre) who was one of the female musicians that influenced her.

== Foray into the word of art and music ==
Her first love was actually painting and sculpting; being a musician was not a priority for her initially. Easter Monday 1987 was the start of her journey into the arts when she visited the National Theatre in Lagos to explore becoming a visual artist. She went to meet Abiodun Olaku a renowned Nigerian painter. Her first love was actually painting and sculpting. She then got caught up in the ambiance of the national theatre. She was later commissioned by the late Bassey Effiong (theatre director) to help him paint the stage for a production of Marriage of Anansewa by Efua Sutherland. It was during this project that she experienced how her 2-dimensional painting dreams began to evolve with their own movement and could take on a life of their own.

During her visits to the National Theatre, being of an inquisitive nature, Yinka explored all the other venues in the complex to see what was going on and stumbled on Elizabeth Hammond (Ghanaian dancer) who held dance classes – she was her inspiration to become a dancer. Elizabeth Hammond performed with the late Christie Essien Igbokwe Silver prize winner at 6th Seoul Songs Festival, South Korea in 1983. As Yinka puts it, that was how she "gatecrashed" the various forms/areas of the arts.

== Launch into music/singing ==
In 1992, the organizers of the Fame music award spotted her as an all-around artist from her work in theatre, video, choreography, background vocals for various Nigerian artist and nominated and gave her their first Upcoming artist award.

The management of a club in Lagos, Bread and Butter Jazz club involved her in the last presentation as a club in an effort to introduce a new renaissance artist called Lagbaja and she was heavily involved in the production of this artiste's first album called Side by Side which was released in 1993. She subsequently concentrated more on music because this demanded more of her time. It was during this period she also collaborated with Nigerian recording artists such as Mike Okri (RnB), Shina Peters (Afro juju), Blackky (Reggae) and many others as both backup vocalists and choreographers for their music videos. Another musician she worked with was the late Geraldo Pino (originally from Sierra Leone) and Etienne T Boy (Cameroonian) who worked with Pino.

On January 21, 1994, she had a collision with a taxi in Lagos when crossing the road. In her words, she "crossed the road and hit a car". This resulted in major surgery which severely affected her ability to dance. She was in between singing and dancing doing a lot of background vocals for other musicians.

== Discography ==
=== Albums ===
- Work (1998)
- Emi n'lo (2002)
- Black Chiffon (2010)

=== Collaborations ===
- I want to praise (Florocka)
- Lagbaja
- Fatai Rolling Dollar
- Alhaji Sikiru Ayinde Barrister

=== Performances ===
- Alex O's Background Vocalist (1990–1992)
- World Music Day Organized by Alliance Francaise (1995 till date)
- Emi Nlo Album Listening by Carl Raccah (2000)
- Yinka Davies in Concert with *5 & 6* Band at the Alliance Francaise Lagos Nigeria (2013, 2014, 2016)
- Jazzville 7th Anniversary concert under direction of Elder Steve Rhodes
- 1999–2002 – she was the resident act at the Nicon Nuga Hilton Hotel in the Nigerian capital city of Abuja.
- 2006 performed with Tony Allen at The Cave during the release of his record Lagos No Shaking.
- African Film Festival Tour – Milan, Tunis, organized by The Goethe Institute.
- Black Chiffon Album Launch (2011)
- Nigerian Idol Judge (2011, 2012, 2013, 2014, 2016)
- Ajumogobia Science Foundation Concerts (2005–2015)
- African Music Festival – London (2015)
- Lagos State Jazz Festival (2016, 2017, 2018)
- Calabar State Jazz Festival (2017)
- Jazz at The United States Consulate's Residence (2015....)

== Theatre/stage ==
- Things Fall Apart directed by Bassey Effiong (1988)
- Lion and The Jewel directed by Bassey Effiong (1988)
- Contemporary Dance Troup led by Elizabeth Hammond (1988–90)
- Wind vs Polygamy directed by Sam Loco Efe (1989)
- Kakaki Concert: directed by Ben Tomoloju (1990)
- Death and The King's Horseman directed by Bayo Oduneye (1990)
- Greener Grass directed by Niji Akanni and Bakare (1990)
- Irara Alagbe directed by Felix Okolo (1992)
- Mekunu Melody by Felix Okolo (1992)
- Area Boy by Felix Okolo (1993)

== Filmography ==
- Maami (2011)
- Battleground (TV series) (2017)
- Unbreakable (2019)

== Awards ==
- FAME music—Upcoming artiste of the year, 1992
- Nigeria Music Award (NMA)—Voice of the Decade, 2007.
