= Grain (film) =

2017 film by Semih Kaplanoğlu

Grain (Buğday)
- Directed by: Semih Kaplanoğlu
- Screenplay by: Semih Kaplanoğlu
- Produced by: Semih Kaplanoğlu
- Starring: Jean-Marc Barr; Ermin Bravo; Grigoriy Dobrygin; Cristina Flutur
- Cinematography: Giles Nuttgens
- Edited by: Osman Bayraktaroğlu; Ayhan Ergürsel; Semih Kaplanoğlu
- Music by: Mustafa Biber
- Production company: Kaplan Film
- Release date: 12 August 2017 (Sarajevo Film Festival)
- Running time: 128 minute
- Country: Turkey
- Language: English

Grain (Buğday) is a 2017 film written and directed by Semih Kaplanoğlu.

== Plot ==
In an undefined near future, Professor Erol Erin, a seed geneticist, lives in a city protected from multi-ethnic immigrants by magnetic walls. For unknown reasons, the city's agricultural plantations have been hit by a genetic crisis. In a meeting at the headquarters of Novus Vita, the corporation which employs him, Erol hears about Cemil Akman, a fellow geneticist who wrote a thesis about the recurrent crises affecting genetically modified seeds. Erol sets out on a journey to find him. A journey that will change everything Erol knew.

== Production ==
The film is produced by Kaplanoğlu's company, Kaplan Film; and co-produced by Heimatfilm (Germany), Sophie Dulac Productions (France), The Chimney Pot (Sweden) and Arte France Cinéma (France). The film was shot in Detroit, Michigan, Germany and Turkey.

== Cast ==
- Jean-Marc Barr as Erol Erin
- Ermin Bravo as Cemil Akman
- Grigoriy Dobrygin as Andrei
- Cristina Flutur as Alice
- Lubna Azabal as Beatrice
- Hal Yamanouchi as Leon
- Mila Böhning as Tara
- Rainer Steffen as Professor Ekrem Aktolga
- Hoji Fortuna as Alexandre
- Jarreth J. Merz as Viktor Rerberg
- Nike Maria Vassil as Prof. Asli Yurtcu
