= Slindile Nodangala =

South African actress

- Born: Slindile Nodangala; 23 June 1972 (age 53); Durban, South Africa
- Occupations: Actress; Singer; voice-over artist
- Years active: 1989–present
- Children: 2

Slindile Nodangala (born 23 June 1972) is a South African actress most famous for acting as Ruby Dikobe, a shebeen queen in the soap, Generations, where her father is Sompisi (Tiki Nxumalo).

== Personal life ==
Nodangala grew up in Durban and was raised by her grandmother, who died in 1997, and her older siblings. When she was younger she was trained by Gibson Kente. Nodangala was also an active member of her church choir. She was involved in a car accident and suffered injuries to her leg and was hospitalised for three months. She has two children, born in 1996 and 2001 respectively.

== Career ==
=== Music ===
Nodangala was a backing vocalist for Stimela between 1994 and 1995.

=== Acting ===
Nodangala had an understudy role in London at the Lyceum Theatre in 2001. She toured the world in five years to places like China, Taipei, Beijing, Shanghai, Malaysia, Beirut and Scandinavia meeting personalities like Prince Charles, Prince Edward, Tim Rice, Shirley Bassey, Elton John and the Prince of Jordan. Nodangala had a starring role on Generations between June 2011 and December 2014. She also featured in award-winning South African movie Izulu lami in 2008 and The Lion King musical. She joined the now-cancelled e.tv soap opera, Rhythm City in 2017. She later played the role of Nomvula Khubeka on eTV daily soap opera, Scandal!. In 2022 she joined the soap opera The River as Nolwazi Dlamini the sister of Lindiwe and Veronica Dlamini. She is currently playing Deliwe on SBONGILE & THE DLAMINIS on Mzansi Wethu.

== Filmography ==
Year	Film	Role
2022	Savage Beauty	Gogo Simphiwe
2022	The River	Nolwazi Dlamini
2017	Rhythm City	
	Scandal!	Nomvula Khubeka
2008	Izulu Lami	
2011 - 2014	Generations	Ruby Dikobe
