= Susan Parvar =

Iranian actress (born 1976)

- Born: March 13, 1976 (age 50); Arak, Markazi, Iran
- Occupation: Actress
- Years active: 1993–present

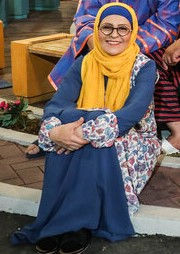
Susan Parvar

Susan Parvar (Persian: سوسن پرور; born March 13, 1976) is an Iranian actress. She is best known for her role as Farideh Parvar in the comedy television series Right on Point (2008). Parvar received a Hafez Award for her performance in Botox (2020).

== Filmography ==
=== Film ===
Year	Title	Role	Director	Notes	Ref(s)
2002	Women's Prison		Manijeh Hekmat		
2014	Red Carpet		Reza Attaran		
2020	Botox	Akram	Kaveh Mazaheri		
2025	Setareh's Husband		Ebrahim Irajzad		
2025	Dinosaur		Masoud Atyabi		

=== Web ===
Year	Title	Role	Director	Platform	Notes	Ref(s)
2023	TNT	Herself	Hamed Ahangi	Filimo	Guest appearance; 1 episode	
2023–2024	Blue Nissan	Zhinous	Masoud Atyabi	Filimo	Main role	
2024–2025	Joker	Herself	Ehsan Alikhani	Filimo	Game show	
2024	The Estrangement	Baran	Amir Pourkian	Filmnet	Main role	
2025	Iranian Dinner	Herself	Saeed Aboutaleb	Filimo	Reality show	
2025	The Demon and the Forehead Moon	Soudabeh	Hossein Ghana'at	Namava	Main role	

=== Television ===
Year	Title	Role	Director	Network	Notes	Ref(s)
2007	Gharib's Story		Kianoush Ayari	IRIB TV3	Recurring role	
2008	Right on Time	Farideh Parvar	Reza Attaran	IRIB TV3	Main role	
2012	The Thief and the Police	Bride of Daruish Garden	Saeed Aghakhani	IRIB TV3	Cameo	

== Awards and nominations ==
Name of the award ceremony, year presented, category, nominee of the award, and the result of the nomination
Award	Year	Category	Nominated work	Result	Ref(s)
Hafez Awards	2021	Best Actress – Motion Picture	Botox	Won	
