= Mahdokht Molaei =

Iranian actress, film director, producer (born 1990)

- مهدخت مولایی
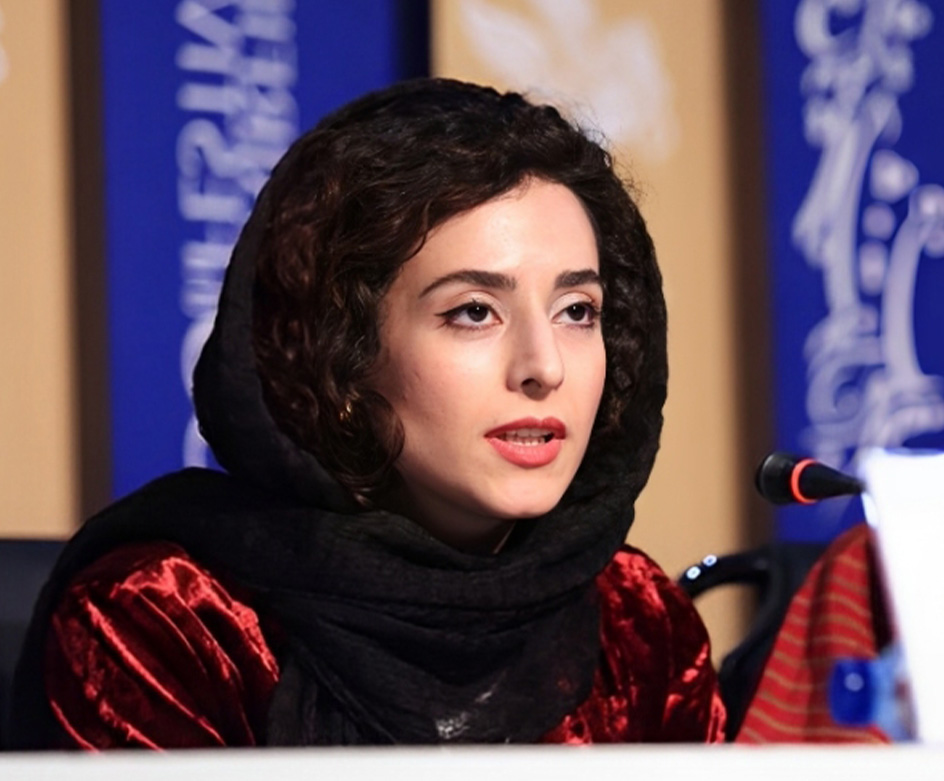
- Mahdokht Molaei at the 2020 Fajr Film Festival
- Born: April 21, 1990 (age 36); Tehran, Iran
- Education: Emerson College
- Occupations: Actress, director, producer
- Years active: 2010–present
- Notable work: Botox (2020)
- Website: mahdokhtmolaei.com

Mahdokht Molaei (Persian: مهدخت مولایی; born April 21, 1990) is an Iranian actress, film director, and producer. She is known for her work in independent and international cinema, with notable roles in Botax (2020), Lily’s Turn (2022), and The Castle (2018). Molaei has been recognized at several international film festivals.

== Early life and education ==
Molaei was born in Tehran, Iran, on April 21, 1990. She began her artistic career in 2010 and has since established herself in various aspects of filmmaking including acting, directing, and producing. In addition to her work in film, she serves as a mentor at Maajara Film School and is a recipient of Emerson College's Presidential Fellowship. She is pursuing an MFA degree in filmmaking at Emerson College.

== Career ==
Molaei's directorial debut, They Are Looking at Us (2016), received an Honorary Diploma from Pasargad Bank 180 second film festival. Her performance in Botax earned her nominations at the Shanghai International Film Festival, and the Nice International Film Festival.

She has participated in numerous national and international productions, often portraying complex female characters. Her recent film, Homa, has been screened at international festivals including IAWRT India.

== Filmography ==
=== Film ===
Year	Title	Role	Notes
2016	They Are Looking at Us	—	Director and producer
2016	Inadaptable	Sara	
2016	Duet	Shahrzad	
2016	Daughter	Pouneh	
2017	Villa Dwellers	Nadereh	
2018	Black Eared	Mahtab	Co-producer and co-writer
2020	Botox	Azar	
2020	Killer Spider	Victim	
2022	Lily’s Turn	Termeh	
2022	Polaroid	Sepideh	
2023	The Black Sheep	Maryam	
2024	Sina	—	Co-director and lead role
2025	Remove Before Use	Mahya	

=== Television ===
Year	Title	Role	Network
2019	Quiet Assassination	Nava	IRIB TV1
2023	Shahbaz	Najva	IRIB TV1

== Awards and recognition ==
- 2020 – Winner – Best Actress, The Castle, BIMIFF
- 2021 – Nominee – Best Actress, Botox, Shanghai International Film Festival
- 2024 – Honorary Diploma – Best Actress, Inherited, Nahal Short Film Festival, Iran
- 2023 – Nominee – Best Actress, Polaroid, Omid International Film Festival
- 2025 – Nominee – Best Actress, The Last Whinny…, Open Air Film Festival
