= Retouch =

Retouch or retouching may refer to:

- Retouch (lithics), the work done to a flint implement after its preliminary roughing-out
- Retouch (film), a 2017 Persian-language film
- Conservation and restoration of paintings
- Photograph manipulation
