= Hoji Fortuna =

Angolan actor (born 1974)

Hoji Ya Henda Braga Fortuna
- Born: 4 September 1974 (age 51); Luanda, Angola
- Education: Catholic University of Portugal
- Occupation: Actor

Hoji Ya Henda Braga Fortuna (born 4 September 1974) is an Angolan actor.

Born in Luanda and named after war hero Hoji-ya-Henda, Fortuna emigrated to Portugal at the age of 20. He worked as a model and DJ in parallel to his study of law at the Catholic University of Portugal in Porto, and eventually took up acting. In 2008, he followed his former partner, travel writer Anja Mutic, to live in New York.

Fortuna has appeared in many stage, TV and film productions since 2001, acquiring a certain celebrity status in Portugal for appearing in at least ten television series there. He received an Africa Movie Academy Award as best supporting actor for his breakthrough role as the criminal César in the 2010 Congolese movie Viva Riva!. In 2013, he was cast to appear in a supporting role in the fourth season of the HBO fantasy drama series Game of Thrones.

== Appearances ==
Television

- O Bar da TV, Portuguese reality TV show based on The Bar, winner (2001)
- Morangos com Açúcar, Portuguese teen drama series (2004)
- Game of Thrones (season 4), American fantasy series, unnamed role (2014)
- Nos Tempos do Imperador, Brazilian telenovela, as Olu Maquemba (2021)

Film

- Viva Riva!, Congolese thriller, as César (2010)
- Duchess, British crime film, as Baraka (2024)
- Banzo as Alphonse (2024)
