= Joanna (2013 film) =

- Directed by: Aneta Kopacz
- Written by: Aneta Kopacz, Tomasz Średniawa
- Release date: 2013
- Running time: 45 minutes

Joanna is a 2013 Polish documentary film by Aneta Kopacz about Joanna Salyga, a young woman with cancer with only three months to live, and her efforts to make the most of her time with her husband and young son. Kopacz learned of Salyga's story through her blog Chustka. Salyga's readers sponsored a crowdfunding campaign to produce this film. Joanna was nominated for the Academy Award for Best Documentary (Short Subject) at the 87th Academy Awards, along with another Polish film in the same category, Our Curse.

== Awards and nominations ==
Awards
Award	Date of ceremony	Category	Recipients and nominees	Result
Academy Award	February 22, 2015	Best Short Subject Documentary	Aneta Kopacz	Nominated

I don't feel disappointed and a loser in any way. I made a film which moves people all over the world as a significant experience and event in their lives. A film which won numerous awards and was nominated for an Oscar! And finally, a film which allows the memory of Joanna to survive and which will show her son Jaś what a simple day with his mom looked like. Nothing is lost here!

— Aneta Kopacz said in a press release after the Oscar ceremony.
