= The Burden (film) =

- Film poster
- Directed by: Niki Lindroth von Bahr
- Written by: Niki Lindroth von Bahr
- Produced by: Kalle Wettre
- Starring: Olof Wretling; Carl Englén; Mattias Fransson; Sven Björklund
- Music by: Hans Appelqvist; Martin Luuk
- Release date: 27 January 2017
- Running time: 14 minutes
- Country: Sweden
- Language: Swedish

The Burden (Swedish: Min börda) is a Swedish independent animated drama short film directed by Niki Lindroth von Bahr produced by Malade AB. It was released on 12 June 2017.

The film has won several prizes, including The Annecy Cristal of the Best animated Short at the 41st Annecy International Animated Film Festival, Best International Short Film at the Toronto International Film Festival 2017, and nominated for the Prize for Best Short Film 2017 at the Directors' Fortnight (Quinzaine des Réalisateurs) during Cannes Festival 2017.

== Plot ==
A dark musical enacted in a modern market place, situated next to a large freeway. The employees of the various commercial venues deal with boredom and existential anxiety by performing cheerful musical turns. The apocalypse is a tempting liberator.

== Accolades ==
Award	Date of ceremony	Category	Recipient(s)	Result	Ref(s)
Directors' Fortnight	June 2017	illy Prize for Best Short Film	The Burden	Nominated	
Annecy International Animated Film Festival	June 2017	Cristal for the Best animated Short	The Burden	Won	
Toronto International Film Festival	September 2017	Best International Short Film	The Burden	Won	
Short Waves Festival	March 2018	Best of Ten Award	The Burden	Won	

The short was part of the world touring screening The Animation Showcase 2017.
