= Tiki Nxumalo =

South African actor (1948–2015)

- Born: 15 November 1948; Lamontville, South Africa
- Died: 8 June 2015 (aged 66)
- Occupations: Actor, musician, dancer, choreographer
- Years active: 1970s–2015
- Notable work: Generations
- Children: 1

Tiki Nxumalo (15 November 1948 – 8 June 2015) was a South African actor most famous for acting as Sompisi the father of shebeen queen Ruby Dikobe (Slindile Nodangala) in the soap Generations.

== Early life and career ==
Nxumalo was born in Lamontville near Durban in 1950. Nxumalo was also a musician even though he had no formal training in both music and acting. He also taught music to children to keep them occupied during the peak of apartheid in 1988 at the Elizabeth Sneddon Theatre.

== Acting career ==
He toured internationally for the hit musical Ipi Tombi in the late 1970s. Nxumalo also worked as a choreographer and musician for the Playhouse in Durban and also the University of KwaZulu Natal and Durban University of Technology. Nxumalo shot to fame in a KFC commercial shot in Umlazi and became a household name in 2009. He later had a minor role on Intersexions. He then landed the role of Sompisi in 2014, who is the delusional father of shebeen owner Ruby Dikobe on Generations. His character Sompisi was also known for being flirty, charming with an insatiable love for tea.

== Personal life ==
Nxumalo was never married and survived by one son Ntokozo Nxumalo. Nxumalo was known for being humble, modest and shy. He also claimed that "he was scared of being famous" because people would grab him and want to take pictures. He would even be too afraid to buy groceries. He loved listening to music and music by Otis Redding and Percy Sledge.

== Death ==
Nxumalo was found dead on the floor of his house on 8 June 2015 in Lamontville from a fatal asthma attack as his medication was found on his bed.
