= The House (TV special) =

2022 British stop-motion anthology film

- Official release poster, resembling a triptych
- Genre: Anthology; Adult animation; Black comedy; Fantasy drama; Psychological horror
- Created by: Enda Walsh
- Story by: Emma de Swaef; Marc James Roels; Niki Lindroth von Bahr; Johannes Nyholm; Paloma Baeza
- Directed by: Emma de Swaef; Marc James Roels; Niki Lindroth von Bahr; Paloma Baeza
- Starring: Mia Goth; Claudie Blakley; Matthew Goode; Mark Heap; Miranda Richardson; Stephanie Cole; Jarvis Cocker; Yvonne Lombard; Sven Wollter; Will Sharpe; Paul Kaye; Susan Wokoma; Helena Bonham Carter
- Music by: Gustavo Santaolalla
- Country of origin: United Kingdom
- Original language: English

Production
- Producers: Charlotte Bavasso; Christopher O'Reilly
- Cinematography: James Lewis; Malcolm Hadley
- Editor: Barney Pilling
- Running time: 97 minutes
- Production companies: Nexus Studios; Netflix Animation Studios

Original release
- Network: Netflix
- Release: 14 January 2022

The House is a 2022 British stop-motion adult animated anthology television special created by Enda Walsh. The production is divided into three chapters telling different stories spanning different worlds, interior designs, and characters (consisting of humans, anthropomorphic rodents and insects, and felines) in the same house; each story deals with themes of madness, wealth, and the pursuit of true happiness.

Originally announced as an anthology miniseries, owing to its short length, it became a television special. Produced for Netflix by Nexus Studios in London, it tells three chapters respectively directed by the duo of Emma de Swaef and Marc James Roels, Niki Lindroth von Bahr, and Paloma Baeza; the directors are credited with the story of their respective segments, with Johannes Nyholm as co-writer for the second.

== Plot ==
=== Story 1: And Heard Within, A Lie Is Spun ===
In the late 19th century, young Mabel lives in poverty with her parents, Raymond and Penny, and baby sister Isobel. After a visit from wealthy relatives who scold Raymond for still living in squalor, he drunkenly wanders into the forest and meets the mysterious architect Mr. Van Schoonbeek. The next day, Van Schoonbeek's agent, Mr. Thomas, arrives and reveals Raymond accepted Van Schoonbeek's offer to build the family a luxurious new house—free of charge.

Once they move in, Mabel notices strange occurrences and constant renovations, while her parents become entranced by the home. Raymond fixates on lighting the fireplace; Penny obsessively sews drapes. Both begin wearing clothes resembling their favorite furnishings—a chair and curtains.

One night, Mabel and Isobel get lost in the ever-changing house and encounter a drunken, weeping Thomas, who confesses that he is an actor following Van Schoonbeek’s script. Meanwhile, Raymond finally ignites the fireplace by burning the family's old belongings. When the girls find their parents in the study, they have transformed into furniture. As fire engulfs the home, the parents urge their daughters to escape. Using the curtains as a rope, Mabel and Isobel successfully flee to safety and watch the burning house from afar as dawn breaks.

=== Story 2: Then Lost Is Truth That Can't Be Won ===
In the early 21st century, in a city of anthropomorphic rodents, a struggling developer tries to renovate the same house for sale after laying off his entire crew. When fur beetles infest the home, he douses it in boric acid, but the bugs persist.

At an unimpressive open house, a bizarre couple shows strong interest and is allowed to stay overnight. Days pass—they remain, the bugs worsen, and the bank demands loan repayment. As more of their odd family arrives, the developer tries to evict them, but police instead warn him over inappropriate calls to his dentist, whom the audience is led to believe was a romantic partner. Legal action is threatened.

Desperate, the developer attempts to poison the couple with boric acid but accidentally inhales it and collapses. He survives, but in a catatonic, feral state. The couple retrieves him from the hospital and brings him "home", where their grotesquely mutated family devours the house from within. In the final scene, the now-animalistic developer emerges from the oven to eat garbage before disappearing underground.

=== Story 3: Listen Again And Seek The Sun ===
In a post-apocalyptic world flooded by rising seas and inhabited by anthropomorphic felines, the house is desperately clung to by Rosa, who grew up there. Struggling financially, she refuses to face the encroaching water and won't evict her only tenants—fisherman Elias and free-spirited Jen—despite their refusal to pay rent.

When Jen’s spiritual partner, the craftsman Cosmos, arrives, Rosa hires him to repair the house. Instead, he begins dismantling it to build a boat for Elias. Furious, Rosa feels betrayed, while Elias accuses her of being too afraid to leave.

After Elias departs, Rosa visits his former room and discovers a farewell note alongside two gifts: a wrapped fish and a manila envelope filled with affectionate drawings of her. As Rosa looks through them, Jen walks in and invites her to lunch for a final meal. Later in the greenhouse, they argue, prompting Jen to let a misty fog inside, which induces a trance in Rosa, who dreams of losing everything. Waking, she sees Jen and Cosmos sailing away and urges to join, but the boat is out of reach. Remembering a lever Cosmos installed, Rosa activates it—transforming the house into a ship as the floodwater uproots it. Reunited with Elias and joined by her friends, Rosa steers the house into the open ocean.

== Voice cast ==
=== Story 1: And Heard Within, A Lie Is Spun ===
- Mia Goth as Mabel
- Claudie Blakley as Penelope
- Matthew Goode as Raymond
- Mark Heap as Mr. Thomas
- Miranda Richardson as Aunt Clarice
- Josh McGuire as Uncle Georgie
- Stephanie Cole as Great Aunt Eleanor
- Barney Pilling as Mr. Van Schoonbeek

=== Story 2: Then Lost Is Truth That Can't Be Won ===
- Jarvis Cocker as the Developer
- Yvonne Lombard as the Odd Wife
- Sven Wollter as the Odd Husband. This was Wollter's final role before his death.
- Bimini Bon-Boulash as Police Officer #1
- Ayesha Antoine as Police Officer #2

=== Story 3: Listen Again And Seek The Sun ===
- Susan Wokoma as Rosa
- Helena Bonham Carter as Jen
- Paul Kaye as Cosmos
- Will Sharpe as Elias

== Production ==
The House was first announced in January 2020, with the anthology being produced at the London unit of Nexus Studios for Netflix. Nexus had three director teams lined up to tell a tale of three distinct family generations at the same house: The duo of Emma de Swaef and Marc James Roels, Niki Lindroth von Bahr, and Paloma Baeza; the directors are credited for the story of their respective segments, with Johannes Nyholm as co-writer for the second. At the 2021 Annecy Film Festival in June, the key voice cast was announced for each story. In November 2021, the first images of the anthology were revealed along with the release date of 14 January 2022. The first trailer was released in December 2021.

Nicolas Ménard and Manshen Lo co-created the hand-drawn, 2D animated title sequence.

The project had originated at a meeting at producer Charlotte Bavasso's London home, where the four directors "brainstormed a bit and came up with this idea about a house in which different things are happening in different times. We agreed that we would each have our own separate chapter, but still with connections to each other," according to von Bahr. Later, "We chatted a lot over Zoom and helped each other with script development and character design, everything. All of us were quite new to such an upscale project, so I think this was a perfect arrangement. You had your own film, but you didn't feel alone." Bavasso, said Baeza, "brought us together and we talked about stories and characters that we were interested in, and we tried to find overlaps, which is a completely unique experience. You never get to work with filmmakers or creatives in that collaborative way where you are each doing a separate film, but also sharing lots of ideas." The directors wrote detailed story outlines, and then Irish playwright Enda Walsh wrote all three segments' dialog in collaboration with them.

Roels said his and Swaef's opening segment came from the desire to tell "the story of the house before there was a house, the origin story, so to speak. I had been reading a graphic novel by Richard McGuire called Here, in which you see a corner of the world and how it changes through millennia. You see it as farmland, and when it was inhabited by Native Americans, and before that when there were dinosaurs. And then suddenly you're in the 1950s and someone's vacuuming the floor. And it kind of sparked off an idea, like what was there before the house?"

Each of the three segments required more than 20 weeks to produce. Except for the Busby Berkeley style dance number in the second segment and the mist and some water effects in the third segment, almost all the animation was done "in camera" without greenscreen or digital compositing. Jarvis Cocker wrote and performed the song that plays over the closing credits.

== Reception ==
On the review aggregator website Rotten Tomatoes, 97% of 36 critics' reviews are positive, with an average rating of 7.40/10. The website's consensus reads: "Whether you're a fan of stop-motion animation or just looking for something deeply, alluringly weird, The House will feel like home." Metacritic, which uses a weighted average, assigned the film a score of 71 out of 100, based on 10 critics, indicating "generally favorable" reviews.

Dmitry Samarov of the Chicago Reader said the movie "sustains its momentum by varying the styles of storytelling and rarely stooping to either crassness or cutesiness. ... Each story is directed by different people with obviously separate ideas and inspirations; this heterogeneity moves the film along without ever letting it overstay its welcome. Yet the unifying elements of setting and the charmingly old-fashioned stop-motion animation keep it from flying off in a million directions."

Lucy Mangan in The Guardian gave the movie 3 out of 5 stars. She said the first segment is "by far the most successful of the trio", and that the second was "too underbaked to deliver any real horrors or work as a fable about violation, or capitalism or any of the other themes it seems at various moments to be nodding vaguely at." She said the third was "a very, very slight affair," and that overall, "If the content of the stories had matched the painstaking form, the anthology could have been rather a groundbreaking success." But Noel Murray of The A.V. Club said of that second segment that, "All of The House is worth watching—especially for animation buffs—but for those who can handle a hefty helping of grotesquerie, von Bahr's segment is the one can't-miss."

Nick Allen at RogerEbert.com said, "With its rising directors each employing a surreal style, it creates a rich balance of ethereal, existential storytelling with stop-motion animation that's so detailed and alive you can practically feel it on your fingertips", and that it "proves to be a consistent anthology, in that it's always just about the same level of surreal, playful, sadistic, and entertaining".

=== Accolades ===
Year	Award	Category	Nominee(s)	Result	Ref.
2022	Primetime Emmy Awards	Outstanding Individual Achievement in Animation	Kecy Salangad (animator)	Won	
2022	Hollywood Music in Media Awards	Original Score — Streamed Animated Film (No Theatrical Release)	Gustavo Santaolalla	Nominated	
2023	Annie Awards	Best Animated Special Production	The House	Nominated	
2023	Annie Awards	Outstanding Achievement for Animated Effects in an Animated Television/Broadcast Production	Germán Díez, Álvaro Alonso Lomba, Hugo Vieites Caamaño	Nominated	
2023	Annie Awards	Outstanding Achievement for Character Animation in an Animated Television / Broadcast Production	Kecy Salangad	Nominated	
2023	Annie Awards	Outstanding Achievement for Music in an Animated Television / Broadcast Production	Gustavo Santaolalla	Nominated	
2023	Annie Awards	Outstanding Achievement for Production Design in an Animated Television / Broadcast Production	Niklas Nilsson, Alexandra Walker	Nominated	
2023	Annie Awards	Outstanding Achievement for Writing in an Animated Television / Broadcast Production	Enda Walsh	Nominated	
2023	British Academy Television Awards	Best Single Drama	Paloma Baeza, Niki Lindroth von Bahr, Emma de Swaef, Marc James Roels, Charlotte Bavasso, Christopher O'Reilly	Nominated	
2023	Gardel Awards	Best Score	Gustavo Santaolalla	Won	
