= Our Curse =

- Film poster
- po: Nasza klątwa
- Directed by: Tomasz Śliwiński
- Written by: Tomasz Śliwiński
- Release date: May 28, 2013 (Krakow Film Festival)
- Running time: 28 minutes
- Country: Poland

Our Curse (original title Nasza klątwa) is a 2013 Polish documentary film by Tomasz Śliwiński documenting the first six months in their life of his son Leo, who has a rare genetic disorder called Ondine's curse. When Leo was born, a friend of Śliwiński's had suggested he document his experiences as a form of therapy. Śliwiński was in film school at the time; his wife Magda Hueckel is a professional photographer. Our Curse was nominated for the Academy Award for Best Documentary (Short Subject) at the 87th Academy Awards, along with another Polish film in the same category, Joanna. The film was produced by Warszawska Szkoła Filmowa.

== Awards and nominations ==
Awards
| Award | Date of ceremony | Category | Recipients and nominees | Result |
|---|---|---|---|---|
| Short Waves Festival | April, 2014 | Grand Prix | Tomasz Śliwiński | Won |
| Academy Award | February 22, 2015 | Best Short Subject Documentary | Tomasz Śliwiński and Maciej Ślesicki | Nominated |
| Crested Butte Film Festival | September 18, 2015 | Best Documentary Short | Tomasz Śliwiński | Won |
