= Patsha Bay =

Congolese actor and singer

- Born: Patsha Bay Mukuna
- Occupations: Actor; Singer
- Years active: 2010-present
- Known for: Viva Riva!

Patsha Bay is a Congolese actor and singer notable for Viva Riva! (2010) and Of Sentimental Value (2016).

== Career ==
Patasha Bay played a leading role in the critically acclaimed Viva Riva!, directed by Djo Tunda wa Munga in 2010, which received 12 nominations and won 6 awards at the 7th Africa Movie Academy Awards. He was also nominated for the Best Actor in a Leading Role award for his performance in the film.

He appeared in the film Of Sentimental Value in the year 2016.

== Filmography ==
- Viva Riva! - 2010
- Of Sentimental Value - 2016
- Hijack '93 - 2024
