= Ben Tomoloju =

Ben Omowafola Tomoloju (born 18 December 1954) is a Nigerian playwright, journalist, theatre director, musician, and cultural activist.

== Early life and education ==
Tomoloju was born in Ilaje Local Government Area, Ondo State, Nigeria14. He spent his early years in different towns within the old Western Region, attending elementary schools in Owo, Ilu-Titun, and Okitipupa before completing his primary education in Agege and Ikeja, Lagos. He went on to study at Christ School, Ado-Ekiti for his secondary education. He got a degree in English and Literary Studies at the University of Ibadan from in 1978.

== Career ==
Tomoloju began his journalism career at 19 as a freelance cartoonist for Newbreed Magazine. He went on to contribute to various publications including The Nigerian Observer and The Punch. He was Arts Editor and later Deputy Editor at The Guardian.

As a dramatist, Tomoloju's plays engage themes of leadership, social justice, and the complexities of Nigerian society. Some of his works includes Jankariwo, Mujemuje, Amona, Iphigenia Finds Aiyelala, and Askari which featured actors like Yinka Davies, Lekan Balogun, and Dickson Ekhaguere. In 1980, he founded the Kakaaki Performance Troupe to nurture young artistic talent. Several of his plays have been performed nationally and internationally.
