= Dickson Ekhaguere =

Nigerian author

Dickson Ekhaguere is a Nigerian author, playwright and entrepreneur who serves as a director at Tryspect Solutions, a writing and publishing company. He is best known for his work titled Unstable, and Nigerian Superheores (The Legend of The Spirit of Nigeria)

== Life and career ==
Born and raised in the ancient city of Benin, Ekhaguere is a graduate of the University of Benin, Edo State. Most notable among his works is Unstable, winner of the 2015 Association of Nigerian Authors award for Drama, which became an accepted text in a variety of institutions of learning, including Universities and Colleges of Education. He is also a public speaker, voice actor, songwriter and singer. His sensational song titled "Unstable" became the theme song for the Theater production of his play Unstable directed by Ben Tomoloju, featuring a cast of theatre veterans such as Tina Mba, Olu Okenkanye, Ropo Eweala, Bassey Okon and many others. In 2017, Dickson's unpublished play "General Ologbosere" was Runner-up winner of the Association of Nigerian Authors award; in the same year, his song titled "HAPPY" was also awarded Best Pop Single by Hot Sound Music Award.

In 2018, Dickson's work UNSTABLE was long listed in the NLNG Nigeria Prize for Literature. Dickson lives in Lagos.
