= Lekan Balogun =

Nigerian dramatist and theatre director

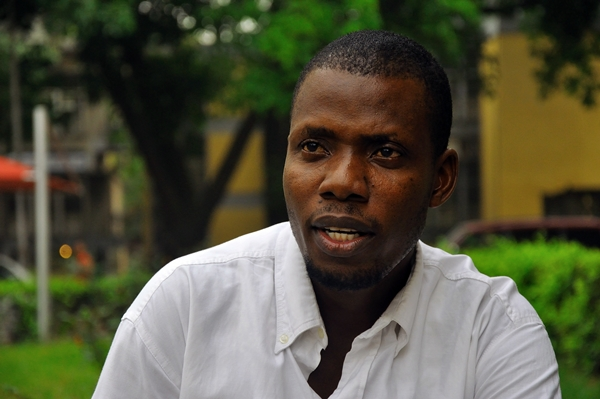
- Balogun in 2012
- Born: Olalekan Ishaq Balogun; 3 March 1973 (age 53); Iwaya, Lagos State, Nigeria
- Occupations: Playwright, essayist, researcher
- Writing career
- Period: 1993-present
- Notable works: Moremi Ajaasoro, Alaafin Kanran, Our Tomorrow Today, The Rejected Stone, Oya, Shaka, Olofin Ajaye: the Story of Lagos
- Notable awards: Moremi Ajaasoro—winner, NANTAP/FESTINA, 2002 Drama Award for Best New Play Atundaolu---winner, Bode Osanyin 2006 Drama Award Beyond the Sunset – selected by the jury for Jos Repertory Theatre, UNIJOS 2006, Festival of Theatre Oya – selected by the jury for Jos Repertory Theatre, UNIJOS 2006, Festival of Theatre, University of Jos. Oya – 2006 University of Lagos Convocation play, University of Lagos, Akoka.

Lekan Balogun (born 3 March 1973) is a Nigerian dramatist and theatre director. His plays include Moremi Ajaasoro, performed as the Western zone's entry for the Festival of Nigerian Plays (FESTINA 2003); Olofin Ajaye and The Mote in the Eye, NANTAP International Theatre Day, 2008 and 2009/20th Anniversary Play projects; The Rejected Stone, an African retelling of the popular fable Cinderella, Alaafin Kanran, Farewell and Dirty Circle for Royal Court Theatre, London, excerpt performed at the Sloane Square, Jerwood Theatre, London, in 2009 with sponsorship from the British Council, Nigeria & GENESIS Foundation, UK; The Ghost Catcher; Goodbye Yesterday; Our Tomorrow Today; Ijebu 1832; For Heroes and Scoundrels, among others. He wrote and directed a play about Zulu folklore (Izibongo) and history in 2008 with the title Shaka, the Zulu legend.

== Early life ==
Lekan Balogun studied English and Social Studies, gaining a Nigerian Certificate in Education (NCE) at the Federal College of Education, Osiele, Abeokuta. He holds a Bachelor of Arts and master's degree (with Distinction) in Theatre Arts from the Department of Creative Arts, University of Lagos, Akoka, Nigeria.

== Career ==
Shortly after graduation from the Federal College of Education, Osiele, Abeokuta, in 1996, Lekan Balogun joined the Centre for Cultural Studies, University of Lagos, Akoka, as an Associate member as well as a member of Akuro Theatre, owned and managed by late Professor Bode Osanyin, playwright and theatre director, under whose tutelage he received professional training as an actor and playwright. With the Centre and Akuro, he was part of productions such as Orisa, Left in the Cold (adaptation of Bertolt Brecht's The Good Person of Szechwan) Two Jolly Men, Ogedengbe, etc. He was in the Coca-Cola-sponsored UNILAG/NUGA GAMES 1998 production of Ben Tomoloju's Jankariwo; Mediaknights/Total Theatre Not, My Fault, 1998; was a member of cast, The Gods Are Not to Blame (MUSON Festival, 2006). He was a member of University of Lagos, Akoka contingent, which went on performance tour of Ghana on the invitation of the Nigeria High Commission in Ghana, to mark Nigeria's 48th Independence, 2008. He has worked variously as a researcher, writer-in-residence and cultural officer for Songobiyi African Creation, established by Princess Adetokunbo Abimbola, wife of Professor Wande Abimbola; as freelance researcher, writer and performer with the Centre for Black and African Art and Civilization(CBAAC); writer and director for the National Association of Nigerian Theatre Arts’ Practitioners, Association of Nigerian Authors among others. He has done extensive research on African myth and legend, Mask, philosophy, religion, metaphysics and has particularly expressed his bias for Yoruba folklore, myth, legend, and history, which have all been reflected in his works. He is the artistic director, Legendaire Theatre, a professional theatre company based in Lagos, Nigeria.

== Directing/production credits ==
Lekan has successfully directed the Theatre workshop class of the Department of English University of Lagos for three years, including the last; Look Back in Gratitude (adaptation of John Osborne's Look Back in Anger) written by Bosede Ademilua-Afolayan. His professional directorial works include Wole Soyinka's Camwood on the Leaves for the inaugural Theatre @Terra, 2007; Olive Branch, produced in conjunction with Kowry Kreations Media (now Image and Heritage); Emmanuel Eni's Death of a Curator; his outfit's production of Love and Colours in Delphi, one of his experimental plays (in association with Theatre Centrik, owned and managed by his long-time friend and associate, Tony Biyi Boyede) and Oya, with support from the National Troupe of Nigeria; Olofin Ajaye, written and directed as NANTAP 2008 International Theatre Day production and The Mote in the Eye, performed as NANTAP 20th Anniversary play, featuring Ambassador Segun Olusola and veteran actors such as Dejumo Lewis, the Oloja of Oja of the Village Headmaster fame, Mufu Onifade, originator of ARAISM, Sola Awojobi-Onayiga, Tunde Alabi and directed by the talented Makinde Adeniran, Femi Osofisan's Women of Owu, etc. Balogun has had a very long professional relationship with the actor and theatre director, William Ekpo, Tunji Sotimirin and few others.

== Experimental works ==
Lekan Balogun has begun a new style of writing he calls "the theory of contradiction", which was inspired by the Absurd Theatre, but drawing from African history, myth and legend. In performance, ritual music and silence are technical components of realization. Plays written to develop the theory include Love and Colours in Delphi, Soyinka in the Eye of Shakespeare read as the National Troupe of Nigeria, 26th in the Series of Play Reading, Harlem Remembered, performed at the Duro Oni @ 60 celebrations, featuring highly talented actor Art-Osagie Okedigun, Wale Lampejo and Qamar Adekunjo; A Walk with Gandhi and Epitaph for Gaddafi. He also collaborated and wrote dialogue for an international production of The Power Play, by the German-based theatre company, FLINN THEATER, which opened to public viewing in September 2012 at Kulturhaus Dock 4, Germany.

== Other Related Works ==
Lekan Balogun is also an essayist, cultural ambassador and columnist for a number of journals. He has been invited as speaker, panel discussant and facilitator in several workshops on art, literature and theatre. He has essays on EDAOTO, among others, and been invited as speaker in several national and international seminars and workshops including Write Associates' The Africa Century International Writers Conference programme, 2012 at the University of the Free State, South Africa and the African Studies Institute International Conference on Africa and its Diaspora with the theme Africa and its Diaspora: Expressions of Indigenous and Local Knowledge, University of Georgia, Athens, USA, 2012.

== Published works ==
- Moremi Ajaasoro – Afrocentric Productions Books, 2002
- Our Tomorrow Today – Afrocentric Productions Books, 2003
- Street Children and Orphans of HIV/AIDS Victims – Afrocentric Productions Books, 2003
- Alaafin Kanran – Literamed Publications (Lantern Books), 2005
- The Rejected Stone – Literamed Publications (Lantern Books), 2005
- Oya – Literamed Publications (Lantern Books), 2008
- Shaka – Literamed Publications (Lantern Books), 2010
- For Heroes and Scoundrels – Legendaire Theatre Production, 2009
- Farewell – British Council, Nigeria Anthology of Drama, 2009
- Olofin Ajaye: the Story of Lagos – Legendaire Theatre Production, 2010

== Awards/Selections ==
Some of Lekan's plays have received critical acclaim, among them the following:

- Moremi Ajaasoro—winner, NANTAP/FESTINA, 2002 Drama Award for Best New Play
- Atundaolu – winner, Bode Osanyin 2006 Drama Award
- Beyond the Sunset – selected by the jury for Jos Repertory Theatre, UNIJOS 2006, Festival of Theatre
- Oya – selected by the jury for Jos Repertory Theatre, UNIJOS 2006, Festival of Theatre, University of Jos
- Oya – 2006 University of Lagos Convocation play, University of Lagos, Akoka
- Harlem Remembered – selected for the inaugural Atlanta Black Theatre Festival, Atlanta, Georgia, USA, 2012.
