= Killer Spider =

- Film poster
- Directed by: Ebrahim Irajzad
- Written by: Oktay Baraheni
- Produced by: Javad Norouzbeigi
- Starring: Mohsen Tanabandeh; Sareh Bayat; Shirin Yazdanbakhsh
- Cinematography: Mahmoud Kalari
- Edited by: Sohrab Khosravi
- Music by: Hamed Sabet
- Production company: Ghab Aseman
- Distributed by: dreamlabfilms
- Release dates: October 29, 2020 (BIFF); February 12, 2022 (Iran)
- Running time: 95 minutes
- Country: Iran
- Language: Persian

Killer Spider (Persian: عنکبوت, romanized: Ankabut) is a 2020 Iranian drama film directed by Ebrahim Irajzad and written by Oktay Baraheni based on the true story of Saeed Hanaei. The film screened for the first time at the 25th Busan International Film Festival.

== Cast ==
- Mohsen Tanabandeh as Saeed
- Sareh Bayat as Zahra
- Shirin Yazdanbakhsh as Malakeh
- Mahoor Alvand as Afsaneh
- Niousha Alipour as Fatemeh
- Golnoush Ghahramani as Mojgan
- Ali Bagheri as Cyclist
- Mehdi Hosseininia as Driver
- Hamidreza Hedayati Rad
- Javad Yahyavi as The Judge
- Mahdokht Molaei as Victim
- Sahar Abdollahi as Victim
- Yousef Khosravi as Mojtaba
- Hamid Haji Mohammadzadeh as Police officer
- Meysam Damanzadeh as Rahman
- Davood Zakeri as Driver
- Farid Sajjadi Hosseini as Saeed's father in-law

== Reception ==
=== Accolades ===
Year	Award	Category	Recipient	Result
2021	Osaka Asian Film Festival	Best Film	Ebrahim Irajzad	Nominated
