= Viva Riva! =

2010 film directed by Djo Tunda Wa Munga

- US film poster
- Directed by: Djo Tunda Wa Munga
- Written by: Djo Tunda Wa Munga
- Produced by: Michaël Goldberg; Steven Markovitz; Djo Tunda Wa Munga; Boris Van Gils
- Starring: Patsha Bay; Manie Malone; Hoji Fortuna; Fabrice Kwizera; Marlene Longage; Alex Herabo; Diplôme Amekindra
- Edited by: Yves Langlois; Pascal Latil
- Release date: 10 September 2010 (TIFF)
- Running time: 96 minutes
- Country: Democratic Republic of the Congo
- Languages: Lingala; French

Viva Riva! is a 2010 Congolese crime thriller film written and directed by Djo Tunda Wa Munga. Starring Patsha Bay, Manie Malone, Fabrice Kwizera, Hoji Fortuna, Marlene Longage, Alex Herabo & Diplôme Amekindra, the film received 12 nominations and won 6 awards at the 7th Africa Movie Academy Awards, making it the most awarded film in the history of the AMAA's up to that date.

Its awards included Best Picture, Best Director, Best Cinematography, Best Supporting Actor, Best Supporting Actress, and Best Production Design. Viva Riva! also won at the 2011 MTV Movie Awards for Best African Movie.

The film was notable for being the first Congolese film produced in the Democratic Republic of Congo in over 28 years.

== Plot ==
The film takes place in Kinshasa during a fuel shortage crisis. Riva, a small-time thug arrives in his hometown with a truckload of fuel he has stolen from Cesar, an Angolan gangster who is hot on his trail. To track down Riva, Cesar blackmails a local military officer, the Commandant, who enlists the help of a local informant. Meanwhile, Riva becomes infatuated with Nora, the girlfriend of a local gangster named Azor. With the help of a local boy who earns his trust, Riva pursues Nora, setting off a chain of events that leads to deadly confrontations for nearly all the main characters.

== Cast ==
- Patsha Bay - Riva
- Manie Malone - Nora
- Hoji Fortuna - Cesar
- Fabrice Kwizera - Jason
- Marlene Longage - The Commandant
- Alex Herabo - J.M.
- Diplôme Amekindra - Azor
- Nzita Tumba - Mere Edo
- Romain Ndomba - G.O.
- Jordan N'Tunga - Anto
- Tomas Bie - Jorge
- Davly Ilunga - Joaquin
- Joseph Kashala - Pere de Riva

== Reception ==
Reviews from critics were largely positive, including from international media such as the New York Times, The Hollywood Reporter, Variety, Le Figaro, and Le Monde. On Rotten Tomatoes it has an approval rating of 87% based on reviews from 60 critics. The site's consensus states: "Vibrant and violent, Viva Riva is a stylish, fast-paced crime drama.". On Metacritic it has a score of 65% based on 16 reviews.
