= Olumide Bakare =

Nigerian actor (1953–2017)

- Born: Olumide Bakare; 26 November 1953; Oyo State, Nigeria
- Died: 22 April 2017 (aged 63); Ibadan, Nigeria
- Occupation: Actor

Olumide Bakare (26 November 1953 – 22 April 2017) was a Nigerian actor.

== Career ==
Bakare began his acting career in the sitcom Koko Close where he featured as Chief Koko with the Nigerian Television Authority (NTA).

== Selected filmography ==
- Ise Onise (2009)
- Ofin Kokonla (2005)
- Oromodie (2008) as Judge Iyilade
- Maami (2011) as Otunba Bamisaye
- Last Flight to Abuja (2012) as Elderly man
- Doctor Bello (2013) as Chief Idowu
- Kofo the first lady (2014)
- Gbogbomolo

== Death ==
Bakare died on 22 April 2017 in Ibadan, Oyo, Nigeria due to heart and lung disease. He battled with illness for over a year and later in earlier 2017, he suffered a cardiac arrest. He was rushed to the emergency unit of University College Hospital and placed in intensive care. According to Mufu Onifade—former president of the National Association of Nigerian Theatre Arts Practitioners (NANTAP)—in his condolence message:

“He had a successful surgery and after the surgery, he talked to people and told them he was fine. But two hours later, he passed on".
