= Retouch (film) =

2017 Iranian short film by Kaveh Mazaheri

- Directed by: Kaveh Mazaheri
- Written by: Kaveh Mazaheri
- Produced by: Kaveh Mazaheri
- Starring: Sonia Sanjari; Mohammadhossein Ziksari; Azadeh Abadpour
- Cinematography: Mohammadreza Jahanpanah
- Edited by: Pooyan Sholehvar
- Distributed by: Premium Films
- Release date: April 2, 2017
- Running time: 20 minutes
- Country: Iran
- Language: Persian

Retouch (Persian: روتوش Rutuš) is an Iranian short film directed by Kaveh Mazaheri, which was co-produced by Kaveh Mazaheri and Iranian Youth Cinema Society (IYCS). The film is one of the most successful Iranian short films that won the Best Short Fiction Film Award from the Fajr Film Festival and the best international film festivals such as Tribeca, Krakow, Palm Springs, Stockholm, Ojai, Tirana and Traverse City. Retouch has enjoyed a successful film festival run, winning at three Oscar qualifying film festivals, including: Tribeca Film Festival (Best Narrative Short), Palm Springs Shortfest (Best Live Action Over 15 Min) and the Krakow Film Festival (Silver Dragon for Best Short Fiction Film).

== Plot ==
Maryam's husband has an accident at home and, rather than saving him, she stops helping and watches him die.

== Awards ==
- Short Waves Festival (Poland 2018)- Winner International Competition 2nd Award
- Tribeca Film Festival (USA 2017)- Winner Best Narrative Short, Winner Jury Prize
- Kraków Film Festival (Poland 2017)- Winner Best Short Fiction Film, Winner Don Quixote Award
- Palm Springs International ShortFest (USA 2017)- Winner Best Live Action over 15 Minutes
- Fajr Film Festival (Iran 2017)-Winner Best Short Film (Crystal Simorgh Prize)
- Curtas Vila do Conde International Film Festival (Portugal 2017) - Winner Audience Award, Nominated Grand Prize
- Stockholm International Film Festival (Sweden 2017) – Winner Best Short Film
- Traverse City Film Festival (USA 2017) - Winner Best Short Fiction Film
- Hancheng International Short Film Festival (China 2017) - Winner 3rd Prize for Best Short Film of Silk Road Competition
- Ojai Film Festival (USA 2017) – Winner Best Narrative Short
- Tirana International Film Festival (Albania 2017) – Winner Best Short Fiction
- Wine Country Film Festival-WCFF (USA 2017) – Winner “COURAGE IN CINEMA” AWARD
- Festival Tous Courts (France 2017) – Winner Jury Prize
- Almería International Film Festival (Spain 2017) – Winner Best Screenplay
- Iranian Film Festival – San Francisco (USA 2017) – Winner Best Screenplay for Short Film
- Asiana International Short Film Festival (Korea 2017) – Winner Jury Special Mention
- São Paulo International Short Film Festival (Brazil 2017) – Winner Audience Favorite Prize, Nominated Best Film
- Bosphorus International Film Festival (Turkey 2017) – Winner Best International Short Fiction Film
- Moscow International Film Festival (Russia 2017) – Nominated Best Film of the Short Film Competition (Silver St. George)
- Durban International Film Festival (South Africa 2017)- Nominated Best International Short Film
- Dokufest International Documentary and Short Film Festival (Kosovo 2017) - Nominated Best Fiction Short Film
- Encounters Film Festival (UK 2017) – Nominated Best Film
- Moondance International Film Festival (USA 2017) – Nominated Best Short Film
- Tallgrass Film Festival (USA 2017) – Nominated Best Short Film
- Tacoma Film Festival (USA 2017) – Nominated Best Short Film
- Sedicicorto International Film Festival (Italy 2017) – Nominated Best Short Film
- Chicago International Film Festival (USA 2017) – Nominated Gold Hugo for Best Fiction Short Film
- Valladolid International Film Festival-Seminci (Spain 2017) – Nominated Best Foreign Short at Meeting Point Section
