= Lambadina =

2015 Ethiopian drama film

- Directed by: Messay Getahun
- Produced by: Messay Getahun
- Starring: Tsion Mekonen, Bersu Samson and others
- Release date: 2015
- Country: Ethiopia

Lambadina is a 2015 Ethiopian drama film produced and directed by Messay Getahun. It was screened at the 2016 edition of the Pan African Film Festival in Los Angeles, California. The film received the Audience Award for Narrative Feature, as well as, Special Jury Recognition-Director for First Feature Narrative. The film also won the award for Best Film by an African Living Abroad at the 12th Africa Movie Academy Awards.

== Cast ==
- Tsion Mekonen
- Bersu Samson
- Addis Kidane
- Michael Yimesgen
- Yosef Ewnetu
- Messay Getahun
- Eyuel Berhanu
