= Pavel Cuzuioc =

Moldovan filmmaker (born 1978)

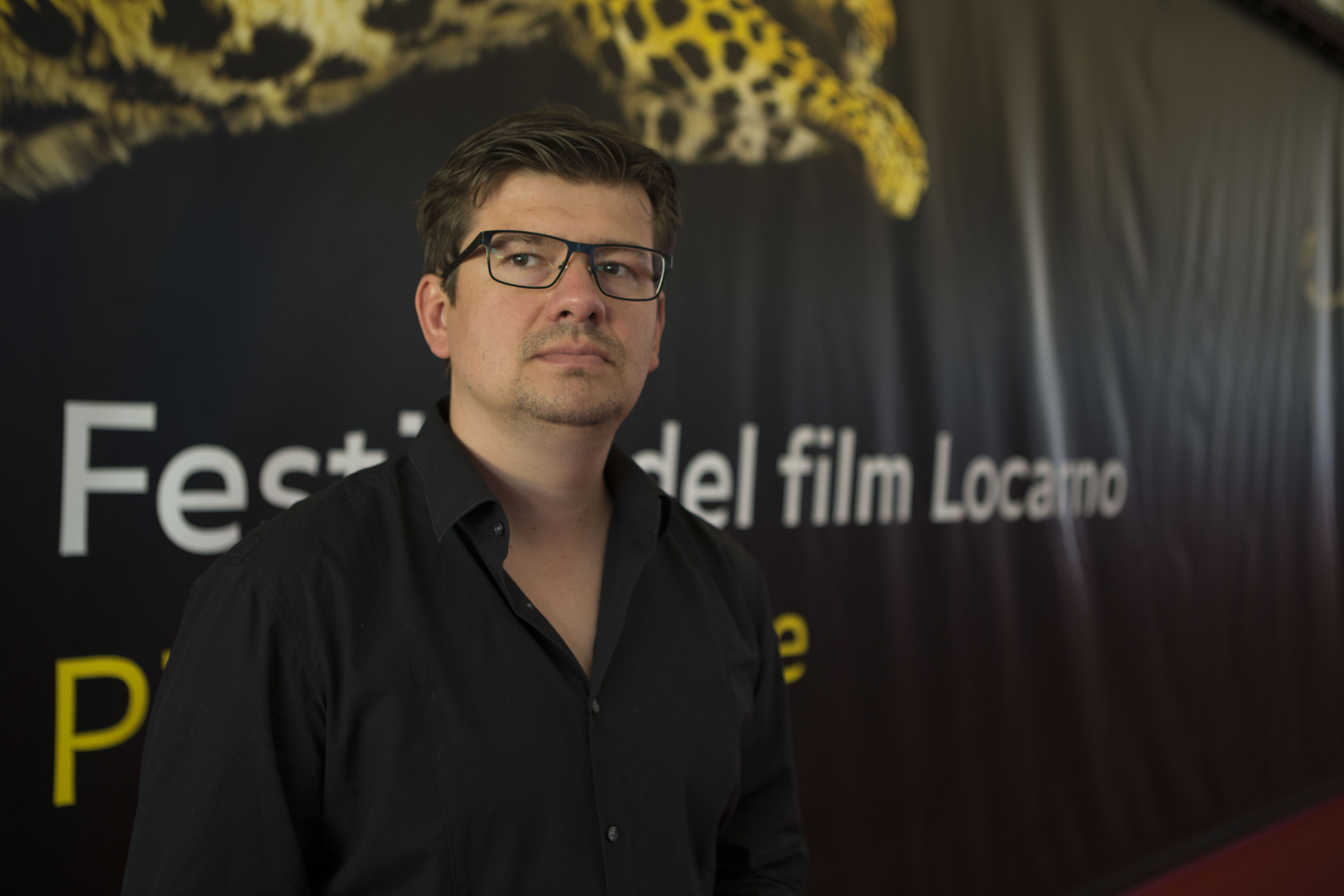
- Cuzuioc at Locarno Film Festival
- Born: Moldova
- Education: State University of Moldova; Diplomatic Academy of Vienna; University of Music and Performing Arts Vienna
- Occupation: Filmmaker
- Notable work: Please Hold the Line (2020), Secondo Me (2016), Raisa (2015)

Pavel Cuzuioc (born 1978) is a Moldovan–Austrian–Romanian filmmaker whose documentaries are recognized for their sensitive exploration of human experiences and emotional landscapes.

== Career ==
Pavel's films have been screened and won several awards at various international film festivals such as Locarno Film Festival, IDFA, Hot Docs, Sheffield Doc/Fest, Clermont-Ferrand, Tallinn Black Nights Film Festival, DocAviv, TIFF, FIPA, VIENNALE, and others.

Cuzuioc's DOINA GROPARILOR (aka 'DIGGING FOR LIFE')' (2011) is a 55 minutes documentary, produced by HBO Europe, on the career gravediggers at Moldova's Doina cemetery—the largest in Eastern Europe, comprising some 250,000 graves spread out over two million square meters of land. The film was screened in 2012 at TIFF, FIPA, Astra Film Festival and at Lincoln Center in New York City during the Making Waves: New Romanian Cinema Festival.

His short film RAISA (2015), starring Cristina Flutur, was selected on over 100 festivals, including Clermont-Ferrand, Cottbus, Fribourg, Vienna Independent Shorts and won several awards at the Tallinn Black Nights Film Festival, Sunscreen Film Festival (USA),. RAISA was broadcast on ARTE and HBO CE.

Before the theatrical release in Austria, Cuzuioc's SECONDO ME (2016) documentary premiered in Semaine de la Critique of Locarno Film Festival and had its North American premiere at Hot Docs Canadian International Documentary Festival, Canada. The film won Best Cinematography Award at DOCUART Film Festival in Bucharest, Romania and the Audience Award at Cronograf Film Festival in Chișinău. SECONDO ME was broadcast on 3sat.

The film follows three cloakroom attendants at three European opera houses: Vienna State Opera, La Scala in Milan and Odessa Opera House. The film reverses the natural order of things, relegating the opera houses and operatic performances to the background, and bringing the ancillary staff to the fore.

Cuzuioc's second feature documentary PLEASE HOLD THE LINE (aka BITTE WARTEN) (2020) premiered at Sheffield Doc/Fest and received the Special Jury Mention at the Astra Film Festival in Sibiu, Romania. The film was part of the Best of Fests section at the International Documentary Film Festival Amsterdam (IDFA) and received The Erste Bank's ExtraVALUE-Film Prize at the Vienna International Film Festival (VIENNALE). The film was theatrically released in Austria and Germany and had screenings at the Anthology Film Archives in New York City.

The documentary COSMOSAPIENS (2023) is a cinematic kaleidoscope delving into the daily routine of a group of scientists who live and work at the Special Astrophysical Observatory, nestled in an isolated village in the Caucasus Mountains. As they confront the vastness of the Universe through their work, they dive into science, philosophy, and art, in pursuit of finding purpose within their earthly existence. COSMOSAPIENS premiered at the Vienna International Film Festival, or VIENNALE, in 2023.

All the above films are available on several major video-on-demand platforms.

In August 2025, Pavel Cuzuioc’s latest work, GRÜNES LICHT (Green Light), premiered in the SEMAINE DE LA CRITIQUE section at the 78th edition of the Locarno Film Festival. The film follows Dr. Johann Spittler, a neuropsychiatrist whose practice assessing and assisting people seeking the right to end their own lives in Germany unfolds within a domain marked by controversy and uncertainty.

== Filmography ==
- Grünes Licht (Green Light) (2025) - director, producer, writer, cinematographer
- Cosmosapiens (2023) - director, producer, writer, cinematographer
- Please hold the line (2020) - director, producer, writer, cinematographer
- Secondo me (2016) - director, producer, writer
- Raisa (2015) - director, producer, writer
- Doina groparilor (2011) - director, writer, cinematographer
- Trois femmes de Moldavie (2006) - director, producer, writer
