= Alexander Hausvater =

Romanian-Canadian stage director (born 1946)

Alexander Hausvater (born June 11, 1949, Bucharest, Romania) is a Romanian-Canadian stage director.

== Productions from 1969 to 1972 ==
- In Ireland: Les Chaises; The Playboy Of The Western World;
- In Israel: The Peacock; Antigone; The Flies; Witches;
- In Canada: The Sybil (Ann Arbor Michigan); In The Shadow Of The Glen (Saidye Bronfman Center, Montréal); L'Heure H (Montréal University, Montréal); This Hour Has Thirty Years (Saidye Bronfman Center, Montréal); Ghelderode Revisited (Neo-Mythos Theatre, Montréal); The Hangman (McGill University, Montréal); Barefoot in the Dark (Neo-Mythos Theatre, Montréal); The Slight Ache (Sir George Williams University, Montréal); Goat Island (Pendulum Theatre, Montréal); The Indian Wants The Bronx (Universitatea Sir George Williams, Montréal); Le Cri de Promethée (Sandwich Theatre, Montréal); Solange (Neo-Mythos, Montréal); Goglu (Neo-Mythos, Montréal); Old Times (Theatre Neptune, Halifax); Bible Show (National Center of Arts, Ottawa); The Sybil (25th Street Playhouse, Saskatoon, Saskatchewan);

== Productions from 1974 to present ==
- 1974 Medeea (Montréal Theatre Lab, Montréal); And They Put Handcuffs on Flowers (Montréal Theatre Lab, Montréal); Seven Ways To Cross A River (Montréal Theatre Lab, Montréal); The Tempest (Universitatea Berkeley, California);
- 1976 Les Grenouilles (Festival de Gêne, Gêne, Italia); Crime et Châtiment (Théâtre Centaur, Montréal); The Full Circle (Theatre Centaur, Montréal);
- 1977 Goya (Montréal Theatre Lab, Montréal); Caligula, The Rogue's Trial (Centrul Saidye Bronfman, Montréal); Dominos (Montréal Theatre Lab, Montréal); Oedipus Rex (La Mamma Theatre, New York); The Rigues Trial, (Montréal Theatre Lab);
- 1978 Trotsky (Toronto); Kaspar (Théâtre Passe Muraille Toronto; turnee la Montréal, Ottawa, Kingston); Elizabeth I (Universitatea Concordia, Montréal); Solzenitsyn (Montréal Theatre Lab, Montréal); La Paix (Québec); Police (National Mime Theatre, Toronto, Montréal); The Seagull (Montréal Theatre Lab, Concordia);
- 1979 Solzenitsyn (National Centre of Arts, Ottawa); Jacques Prévert (Théâtre des Quatre Sous, Montréal); La bonne âme de Setzuan (Universitatea Ottawa); Changes (76th Street Theatre, New York, Statele Unite); Brecht on Brecht, (New York, Statele Unite);
- 1980 Comrade Pioneer (Rochester, New York); Boris Vian Pokerblues (Théâtre des Quatre Sous, Montréal); Biographie, Un Jeu (Saidye Bronfman Centre, Montréal); L'amante Anglaise (Centaur Theatre, Montréal); La Mouette (Montréal Theatre Lab, Montréal);
- 1981 Boris Vian Pokerblues (Théâtre des Quatre Sous, Montréal); Metamorphoses (Théâtre des Quatre Sous, Montréal); Happy End (Montréal Theatre Lab, Montréal); Le Décameron (Gêne Int., Gêne, Italia);
- 1982 Oncle Vania (Théâtre du Bois de Coulonge, Québec); Le fou et la nonne (L'Echiquier, Montréal); Le Décameron (Théâtre des Quatre Sous, Montréal); Stop Watch (Rochester Theatre, Statele Unite);
- 1983 Hamlet (Théâtre des Quatre Sous, Montréal);
- 1984 Trois chansons d'amour (Théâtre du Bois de Coulonge, Québec); Mahagonny (Théâtre des Quatre Sous, Montréal); Les Frères Karamazov (L'Echiquier, Montréal); L'Artiste de la Faim (Théâtre des Quatre Sous, Montréal);
- 1985 Trio, Café de la Place (Place des Arts, Montréal); Dix Petits Nègres (Théâtre du Bois de Coulogne, Québec); Les Troyennes (L'Echiquier, Montréal); The Butterfly Hunter and The Bride (Théâtre Saidye Bronfman, Montréal); Lenz (Opera SMCQ, Montréal, Québec, Toronto);
- 1986 Ecart Temps (Théâtre des Quatre Sous, Montréal); L'Assassin (Théâtre du Bois de Coulogne, Québec); Ghetto (Toronto Workshop Productions, Toronto); Dinosaurus (Fred Bary, Montréal); Dialogue (Royal Alexander Theatre, Toronto);
- 1987 L'Enfant en pénitence (Théâtre de l'Ile, Québec); Up Your Alley (Théâtre Saidye Bronfman, Montréal); Péricles (Théâtre Passe Muraille, Toronto); Schweyk (UQAM, Montréal); Molière (National Theatre School, Montréal); Lady Lester (Festival des Amériques, Montréal); Spectacle Botto Strauss (La Licorne, Montréal);
- 1988 Le baiser de la femme araignée (Montréal, New York, Edmonton, Edinburgh); Goya (Théâtre Studio, Varșovia, Polonia); Les étrangers (Copenhaga, Danemarca); Richard III (Mickery Théâtre, Olanda); The Power of Darkness (Universitatea Concordia, Montréal);
- 1989 A deLEARium Parade (APA, Montréal); Dossier Rigoletto (La Veillée, Montréal, Québec, Sherbrooke); Le baiser de la femme araignée (La Licorne, Montréal și National Centre of Arts, Ottawa); Le process (Winnipeg, Manitoba);
- 1990 Jeux de massacre (Option Théâtre, St. Hyacinthe, Québec); Comme il vous plaira (UQAM, Montréal); Jeux de femmes (Café de la Place, Place des Arts, Montréal);
- 1991 Comme il vous plaira (Théâtre de la Licorne, Montréal); Italian American Reconciliation (Elysée, Montréal); The Kiss of the Woman Spider, (Edmonton, Long Island); ... au pus cătușe florilor (Teatrul Odeon, București);
- 1993 Venus și Lady Chatterly (La Chapelle Historique, Montréal); M. Butterfly (Centre Saidye Bronfman, Montréal); La Țigănci (Teatrul Odeon, București, România); Je vous ecris du Caire (Théâtre d'Aujourd'hui, Montréal); Conte d'Hiver (Option Theatre, St. Hyacinthe);
- 1994 Teibele and Her Demon (Rialto Theatre, Montréal); Menottes sur les fleurs (Oldenburg, Germania); Les Guerriers (Théâtre Français du Toronto, Toronto);
- 1995 Pericle (Odeon Theatre, Bucharest, Romania); Orange mecanique (Rialto Theatre, Montréal); Passion Play (Centre Saidye Bronfman, Montréal); Salomée (La Licorne, Montréal);
- 1996 Les femme gitannes (Oldenburg, Germania); L'ile d'Achille (Place des Arts, Montréal);
- 1997 Barbe Bleu (Goethe Institute, Montréal); Le marionetiste du Lodz (Centre Saidye Bronfman, Montréal);
- 1998 There Is No Tavern in This Town (Victoria Hall, Montréal); Teibele and her demon (National Theatre, Iași, Romania); L'arbre du vie, La chapelle de bon (Montréal);
- 1999 Nebunul și călugărița ("Toma Caragiu" Theatre, Ploiești, Romania); Machiavelli (a coproduction of Ariel Theatre, Râmnicu Vâlcea, Romania and Odeon Theatre, Bucharest, Romania);
- 2000 Roberto Zucco ("Vasile Alecsandri" National Theatre Iași, România); Dear Hunter (Theatre on the Beach, Vancouver);
- 2001 Don Perimplin and Belisa in the garden ("Toma Caragiu" Theatre, Ploiești, Romania); Blue Beard (Independento Teatro, Mexico City); Machinal (Național Theatre Bucharest); Revolution (L'Echiquier, Montréal);
- 2002 The Cannibals (National Theatre "Radu Stanca", Sibiu); Lupii (CBC Theatre, Toronto); The Pedestrian and the Fury (Theatrum Mundi, Bucharest, România); Nō Five Lovestories (Teatrul Național "Vasile Alecsandri" Iași, România);
- 2003 The Cherry Orchard (National Theatre Iași, România); Ice and Orchids ("Ioan Slavici" Theatre, Arad, Romania); Dialogue (ACCO Municipal Theatre, Israel);
- 2004 Live from Amsterdam: Anneee Frank ! (Jewish Theatre, Bucharest); The night of16 January (State Theatre, Oradea, Romania); Uprooted (Workshop Theatre, Tel Aviv, Israel); Cymbelin (German Theatre Timișoara, România); Derby (National Theatre "Radu Stanca", România)
- 2005 Salomeea (National Theatre "Vasile Alecsandri", Iaşi, România), Don Juan & Faust (Hungarian State Theatre "Csiky Gergely", România)
- 2006 The Tropical Tree (National Theatre "Vasile Alecsandri", România), He who gets slapped ( "Regina Maria" State Theatre, România), Athenee Palace Hotel ("Mihai Eminescu" National Theatre )
- 2007 Judecata (Teatrul German de Stat, Timișoara, România), Requiem (Teatrul Bacovia, România), The Monument (G. A. Petculescu Theatre, Romania)
- 2008 Dracula's Diary (Teatrul de Nord, Satu Mare, Romania), Amoc ("Ion Slavici" Theatre, Arad, Romania), Women of Trahis (Municipal Theatre, Târgoviște, Romania), The Rocky Horror Show (Club Kristal, Bucharest, Romania), Trubadur (National Opera Bucharest, România)
- 2009 The Winter's Tale (National Theatre "Mihai Eminescu", Timișoara, Romania), Visoțki Odissey (Teatrul Național de Operetă "Ion Dacian", București, România, FridaKahloMania (Teatrul Dramatic "Ion D. Sîrbu", Petroșani, România
- 2010 The Svejk Galaxy ("Țăndărică" Animation Theatre, Bucharest, România), The Pupeteer (Jewish State Theatre, Bucharest, Romania)
- 2011 Julius Caesar ("Mihai Eminescu" National Theatre, Timișoara, Romania), Don Carlos (Teatrul German de Stat, Timișoara, Romania)

== TV and film productions ==
- CBC: The West, 1978
- PBS: Dissidents, 1981
- Co-producție Israel / Egypt: Our Story, 1982
- TV Ontario: Notre Théâtre, 1989
- TV Polonia Warsaw: Goya, 1990

== Books ==
- Solzhenitsyn (teatru), Playwrights Canada, 1979 - 86 pages
- Comrade Pioneer: a diary in sixteen sequences, Playwrights Canada
- Decameron, Playwrights Canada, 1982

== Works translated into Romanian ==
- Decameronul (teatru), ed. Tracus Arte, 2008
- Tovarășul pionier (teatru), ed. Tracus Arte, 2008
- Chopin. Ultima Mazurka (teatru), ed. Tracus Arte, 2008
- Athenee Palace Hotel (teatru), ed. Brumar, 2008

== Bibliography ==
- Modreanu, Cristina - The masks of Hausvater, Fundaţia Culturală "Camil Petrescu", Bucharest, Romania, 2005
