= Kaveh Mazaheri =

Iranian director and screenwriter (born 1981)

- کاوه مظاهری
- Born: 14 September 1981 (age 45); Tehran, Iran
- Occupations: Film director; screenwriter
- Years active: 2007–present
- Awards: Tribeca Film Festival (2017)

Kaveh Mazaheri (Persian: کاوه مظاهری; born 14 September 1981)) is an Iranian film director and screenwriter.

He started his work by writing a film critique in magazines. After graduating in railway engineering from Iran University of Science and Technology in 2005, he made his first short narrative film entitled "Tweezers". He has directed four independent short narrative films and more than twenty short and medium-length documentaries. He has won numerous awards from national and international film festivals for short film Retouch, such as "Best Short Fiction Film" at Tribeca, Kraków, Palm Springs, Stockholm, Tirana, Fajr Film Festivals

== Filmography ==
Film

- Botox (2019)

Short

- Tweezers (2007)
- Cockroach (2016)
- Retouch (2017)

Documentary

- Waxinema (2008)
- Day of Blood (2008)
- Soori's Trip (2010)
- A Report about Mina (2015)
- Flight to Pardis (2016)

== Awards ==
- Yamagata International Documentary Film Festival (Japan 2015)- Winner Jury Special Mention
- Tribeca Film Festival (USA 2017)- Winner Best Narrative Short, Winner Jury Prize
- Kraków Film Festival (Poland 2017)- Winner Best Short Fiction Film, Winner Don Quixote Award
- Palm Springs International ShortFest (USA 2017)- Winner Best Live Action over 15 Minutes
- Fajr Film Festival (Iran 2017)-Winner Best Short Film (Crystal Simorgh Prize)
- 25th Curtas Vila do Conde International Film Festival (Portugal 2017) – Winner Audience Award, Nominated Grand Prize
- Stockholm International Film Festival (Sweden 2017) – Winner Best Short Film
- Traverse City Film Festival (USA 2017) – Winner Best Short Fiction Film
- Hancheng International Short Film Festival (China 2017) – Winner 3rd Prize for Best Short Film of Silk Road Competition
- Ojai Film Festival (USA 2017) – Winner Best Narrative Short
- Tirana International Film Festival (Albania 2017) – Winner Best Short Fiction
- Wine Country Film Festival-WCFF (USA 2017) – Winner "COURAGE IN CINEMA" AWARD
- Aix-en-Provence International Short Film Festival (France 2017) – Winner Jury Prize
- Almería International Film Festival (Spain 2017) – Winner Best Screenplay
- Iranian Film Festival – San Francisco (USA 2017) – Winner Best Screenplay for Short Film
- Asiana International Short Film Festival (Korea 2017) – Winner Jury Special Mention
- São Paulo International Short Film Festival (Brazil 2017) – Winner Audience Favorite Prize, Nominated Best Film
- Bosphorus International Film Festival (Turkey 2017) – Winner Best International Short Fiction Film
- International Short Film Festival ZUBROFFKA (Poland 2017) – Winner Best Film
- SETEM Academy Silk Road International Film Festival (Turkey 2017) – Winner Grand Special Jury prize
- Moscow International Film Festival (Russia 2017) – Nominated Best Film of the Short Film Competition (Silver St. George)
- Durban International Film Festival (South Africa 2017)- Nominated Best International Short Film
- Dokufest International Documentary and Short Film Festival (Kosovo 2017) – Nominated Best Fiction Short Film
- Encounters Film Festival (UK 2017) – Nominated Best Film
- Moondance International Film Festival (USA 2017) – Nominated Best Short Film
- Denver Film Festival (USA 2017) – Nominated Best Short Film
- Tallgrass Film Festival (USA 2017) – Nominated Best Short Film
- Tacoma Film Festival (USA 2017) – Nominated Best Short Film
- Adelaide Film Festival (Australia 2017) – Nominated Best Short Film
- Sedicicorto International Film Festival (Italy 2017) – Nominated Best Short Film
- Chicago International Film Festival (USA 2017) – Nominated Gold Hugo for Best Fiction Short Film
- Valladolid International Film Festival Seminci (Spain 2017) – Nominated Best Foreign Short at Meeting Point Section
