= 7th Africa Movie Academy Awards =

2011 film awards ceremony

- Official poster
- Date: Sunday, 27 March 2011
- Site: Gloryland Cultural Center; Yenagoa, Bayelsa State, Nigeria
- Organized by: Africa Film Academy

Highlights
- Best Film: Viva Riva!
- Most awards: Viva Riva! (6)
- Most nominations: Viva Riva! (12)

The 7th Africa Movie Academy Awards ceremony was held on 27 March 2011 at the Gloryland Cultural Center in Yenagoa, Bayelsa State, Nigeria, to honour the best African films of 2010. The nomination ceremony was held at the Ole Sereni Hotel in Nairobi, Kenya on 25 February 2011. For the films released in 2010, Africa Movie Academy Awards were presented in 26 categories.

== Winners ==
The winners of the 26 Award Categories are listed first and highlighted in bold letters.

Best Picture	Best Director
Viva Riva! - Djo Tunda Wa Munga (Congo); Sinking Sands - Leila Djansi (Ghana); Aramotu - Niji Akanni (Nigeria); Soul Boy - Hawa Essuman (Kenya); Hopeville - John Trengove (South Africa); A Small Town Called Descent - Jahmil X.T. Qubeka (South Africa)	Djo Tunda Wa Munga - Viva Riva!; Hawa Essuman - Soul Boy; Oliver Hermanus - Shirley Adams; Niji Akanni - Aramotu; Jahmil X.T. Qubeka - A Small Town Called Descent; Leila Djansi - Sinking Sands
Best Actress in a Leading Role	Best Actor in a Leading Role
Ama K. Abebrese - Sinking Sands; Genevieve Nnaji - Tango With Me; Idiat Shobande - Aramotu; Omoni Oboli - Anchor Baby; Manie Malone - Viva Riva!; Denise Newman - Shirley Adams	Themba Ndaba - Hopeville; Patsha Bay - Viva Riva!; Jimmy Jean-Louis - Sinking Sands; Ekon Blankson - Checkmate; Antar Laniyan - Yemoja; Majid Michel - Pool Party
Best Actress in Supporting Role	Best Actor in Supporting Role
Marlene Longage - Viva Riva!; Mary Twala - Hopeville; Joyce Ntalabe - The Rivaling Shadow; Tina Mba - Tango With Me; Yvonne Okoro - Pool Party	Hoji Fortuna - Viva Riva!; Osita Iheme - Mirror Boy; Mpilo Vusi Kunene - A Small Town Called Descent; John Dumelo - A Private Storm; Desmond Dube - Hopeville
Best Young Actor	Best Child Actor
Edward Kagutuzi - Mirror Boy; Yves Dusenge & Roger Nsengiyumua - Africa United; Samson Odhiambo & Leila Dayan Opou - Soul Boy; Donovan Adams - Shirley Adams; Junior Singo - Hopeville	Sobahle Mkhabase, Tschepang Mohlomi & Sibonelo Malinga - Izulu lami; Eriya Ndayambaje - Africa United; Jordan Ntunga - Viva Riva!; Ayomide Abatti - Maami; Benjamin Abemigisha - Zebu And The Photofish; Shantel Mwabi - Suwi
Best Film in African Language	Best Nigerian Film
Izulu lami - Madoda Ncayiyana (South Africa); Aramotu - Niji Akanni (Nigeria); Soul Boy - Hawa Essuman (Kenya); Suwi - Musola Catherine Kaseketi (Zambia); Fishing The Little Stone - Kaz Kasozi (Uganda)	Aramotu - Niji Akanni; Maami - Tunde Kelani; Tango With Me - Mahmood Ali- Balogun; Inale - Jeta Amata; A Private Storm - Lancelot Oduwa Imaseun & Ikechukwu Onyeka
Best Screenplay	Best Cinematography
Sinking Sands; Soul Boy; Hopeville; Shirley Adams; Izulu lami	Viva Riva!; Sinking Sands; Maami; Izulu lami; Hopeville
Best Achievement in Sound	Best Soundtrack
Shirley Adams; Sinking Sands; Izulu Lami; Viva Riva!; Tango With Me	Inale; Viva Riva!; Africa United; Izulu Lami; A Small Town Called Descent
Best Visual Effects	Best Make Up
A Small Town Called Descent; Aramotu; Nani; Who owns da city; Inale	Sinking Sands; Inale; A Private Storm; Viva Riva!; A Small Town Called Descent
Best Costume Design	Best Production Design
'Aramotu'; Inale; Yemoja; Sinking Sands; Elmina	Viva Riva!; Tango With Me; Hopeville; 6 Hours To Christmas; Maami
Best Documentary	Best Short Documentary
Kondi Et Le Jeudi Nationale - Ariana Astrid Atodji (Cameroon); Headlines In History - Zobby Bresson (Kenya); Co-Exist - Adam Mazo (Rwanda); State Of Mind - Djo Tunda Wa Munga (Congo); Naija Diamonds - Nfrom Leonard (Nigeria)	After The Mine - Diendo Hamadi & Dinta Wa Lusula (Democratic Republic of the Congo); Symphony Kinshasa - Diendo Hamadi & Dinta Wa Lusula (Congo); Naija Diamond (Feature On Dr. Rahmat Mohammed) - Nform Leonard (Nigeria); Stepping Into The Unknown - Rowena Aldous & Jill Hanas-Hancock (South Africa); Yeabu’s Homecoming - Jenny Chu (Sierra Leone)
Best Short Film	Best Diaspora Short Film
Dina - Mickey Fonseca (Mozambique); Bougfen - Petra Baninla Sunjo (Cameroon); Weakness - Wanjiru Kairu (Kenya); No Jersey No Match - Daniel Ademinokan (Nigeria); Duty - Mak Kusare (Nigeria); Bonlambo - Zwe Lesizwe Ntuli (South Africa); Zebu And The Photofish - Zipporah Nyarori (Kenya); Allahkabo - Bouna Cherif Fofana (Togo)	Precipice - Julius Amedume (UK); Cycle - Roy Clovis (USA); Under Tow - Miles Orion Feld (USA); Habitual Aggression - Temi Ojo (USA); Little Soldier - Dallas King (USA); The New N Word - Sowande Tichawonna (USA)
Best Film for African Abroad	Best Diaspora Feature
In America: The Story of the Soul Sisters - Rahman Oladigbolu (Nigeria/USA); Anchor Baby - Lonzo Nzekwe (Nigeria/Canada); Mirror Boy - Obi Emelonye (Nigeria/UK); Africa United - Debs Gardner-Brook (Rwanda/UK)	Suicide Dolls - Keith Shaw (USA); Tested - Russell Costanzo (USA); Nothing Less - Wayne Saunders (UK); The Village - Wayne Saunders (UK)
Best Diaspora Documentary	Best Editing
Stubborn As A Mule - Miller Bargeron Jr & Arcelous Deiels (USA); Momentum - Zeinabu Irene Davis (USA); If Not Now - Louis Haggart (USA); Motherland - Owen Alik Shahadah (USA); Changement - Chiara Cavallazi (Italy)	Soul Boy; Sinking Sands; Hopeville; Tango with me; Viva Riva

== Films with multiple nominations ==
The following films received multiple nominations.

- 12 nominations
  - Viva Riva!
  9 nominations
  - Sinking Sands
  8 nominations
  - Hopeville
  6 nominations
  - A Small Town Called Descent
  - Izulu Lami
  5 nominations
  - Inale
  - Soul Boy
  - Shirley Adams
  - Tango With Me
- 4 nominations
  - Africa United
  - Maami
  3 nominations
  - Aramotu
  - Mirror Boy
  2 nominations
  - Anchor Baby
  - Pool Party
  - Yemoja
  - Zebu And The Photofish
