= Niki Lindroth von Bahr =

Swedish cinematographer (born 1984)

- Born: 14 February 1984 (age 42); Stockholm, Sweden
- Education: Royal Institute of Art
- Occupations: Film director, animator, artist
- Website: www.nikilindroth.com

Niki Lindroth von Bahr (born 14 February 1984) is a Swedish director and animator based in Stockholm, Sweden.

== Biography ==
Lindroth von Bahr was born in Stockholm. She studied animation at the Royal Institute of Art. She received her master's degree in fine art in 2016. Her films Bath House (2014) and Tord & Tord (2010) have been screened in prestigious festivals such as Berlinale, Sundance and Annecy. Tord & Tord was nominated as Best Short film at Guldbaggegalan (Main Swedish film award) 2011 and won the Grand Prix of Fredrikstad Animation Festival the same year.

In 2017, Lindroth von Bahr released The Burden, a dystopian animated musical. Her short was nominated for the Prize for Best Short Film 2017 at the Directors' Fortnight (Quinzaine des Réalisateurs) during Cannes Festival in May 2017. One month later, The Burden won the Oscars qualifying Cristal Award for the Best Animated Short at the Annecy International Animated Film Festival in France. Since the release The Burden has won over 80 awards.

Lindroth von Bahr is a member of the Oscars Academy since 2020. She is also a costume designer and has been working for artists like Fever Ray and David Bowie.

== Filmography ==
=== Short films ===
- En natt i Moskva (2006), animation, 4 min
- Tord and Tord (2010), animation, 11 minutes
- Bath House (Simhall) (2014), animation, 15 minutes
- The Burden (Min Börda), (2017), animation, 14 minutes
- Something to Remember (Något att minnas), (2019), animation, 5 minutes

=== Feature films ===
- The House (2022) – Segment: II – Then lost is truth that can't be won
