= Raisa (film) =

- Directed by: Pavel Cuzuioc
- Written by: Pavel Cuzuioc
- Produced by: Pavel Cuzuioc Christian D. Bruun Michael Schindegger
- Starring: Cristina Flutur, Maria Sagaidac
- Cinematography: Michael Schindegger
- Edited by: Pavel Cuzuioc
- Release date: December 2015
- Running time: 15 minutes
- Countries: Austria, Moldova, Romania
- Language: Romanian

Raisa is a short film directed and written by Pavel Cuzuioc starring Cristina Flutur.

== Synopsis ==
Moldova. One winter day, Raisa travels into the city hoping to get something that could change her life.

== Production notes ==
Raisa was filmed during five days in January 2015 on locations in Chișinău and surroundings. The script is based on non-fictional stories by Aurelia Zavtoni. Post-production took place in Vienna, Austria. The film is starring Cristina Flutur, who won the Palme d'Or for best Actress in the 2012 Cannes Film Festival.

== Technical details ==
Raisa was filmed in HD at 25 frames per second on Canon C300. The screening format is DCP, 2K, with an aspect ratio is 1:2.39.

== Awards and nominations ==
| Award | Date of ceremony | Category | Recipients and nominees | Result |
|---|---|---|---|---|
| Valletta Film Festival, Malta | June 5, 2016 | Official Selection | | |
| Berkshire International Film Festival, USA | June 3, 2016 | Official Selection | | |
| Transilvania International Film Festival, Romania | June 1, 2016 | Official Selection | | |
| Vienna International Shorts, Austria | May 27, 2016 | Official Selection | | |
| Cronograf International Film Festival, Moldova | May 13, 2016 | Official Selection | | |
| Sunscreen Film Festival, USA | May, 2016 | Best International Short Film Award | Pavel Cuzuioc(Director), Christian D. Bruun(producer) | Won |
| Vilnius Film Festival, Lithuania | January 4, 2016 | Official Selection | | |
| Short Waves Film Festival, Poland | March 18, 2016 | Poznan Open Award | ‘’Raisa’’ | 2nd award |
| Fribourg International Film Festival | March 17, 2016 | Best Short Film Award | Pavel Cuzuioc | Nominated |
| Diagonale. Festival of Austrian Film, Graz | March 9, 2016 | Official Selection | | |
| Clermont-Ferrand International Short Film Festival | February, 2016 | Official Selection | | |
| Sleepwalkers International Short Film Festival, Estonia | November 21, 2015 | Official Selection | ’’Raisa’’ | Special Mention |
| Cottbus Film Festival, Germany | November 6, 2015 | Official Selection | | |
