= Godwin Enakhena =

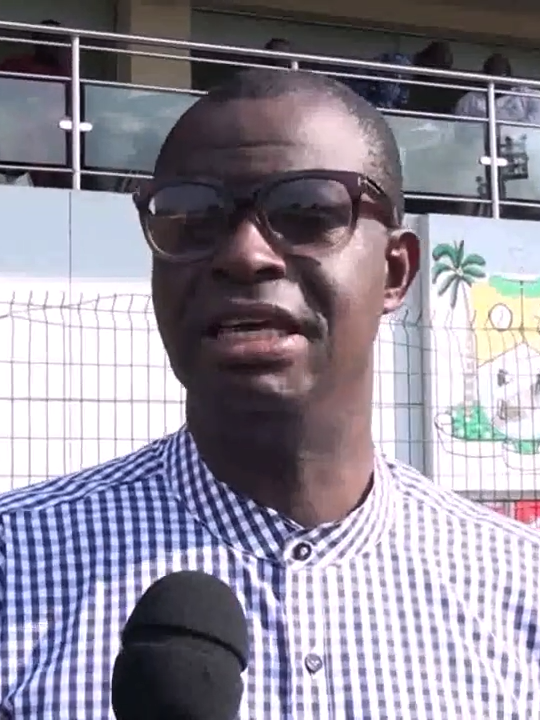
- Enakhena in 2021
- Occupations: Journalist; television producer; radio show host
- Organizations: Today Sports; Ambrose Alli University; Ekpoma

Godwin Enakhena is a Nigerian sports journalist and analyst. He currently serves as the Director of Sports of Mountain of Fire and Miracles Ministries ( M.F.M)

== Recognition ==
In 2014, Godwin Enakhena was awarded the Sports Journalist of the year Radio at the Nigeria Sports Awards ceremony which was held at the Muson Centre, Onikan, Lagos .

Godwin is the Sports Administrator, Chairman Sporting Lagos FC, Gen Sec. Of NPFL Club Owners Association, and Director of Sports MFM.
