= In America: The Story of the Soul Sisters =

- Directed by: Rahman Oladigbolu
- Produced by: Yvon Alteon
- Starring: Jimmy Jean-Louis; Mirlyne Dorvilus; Kandace Cummings
- Cinematography: Ken Willinger
- Edited by: Brian Patriacca
- Production company: Oracle Films International
- Release date: 2010
- Country: USA
- Language: English

In America: The Story of the Soul Sisters is a 2010 Nigerian American film directed by Rahman Oladigbolu and starring Jimmy Jean-Louis and Roger Dillingham Jr. It won the Best Film by an African Living Abroad award at the 7th Africa Movie Academy Awards and the Best Emerging Filmmaker's Award at the 2010 Roxbury International Film Festival in Boston Massachusetts.
