= Botox (film) =

2020 Canadian-Iranian film

- Official English poster
- Directed by: Kaveh Mazaheri
- Written by: Kaveh Mazaheri; Sepinud Najian
- Screenplay by: Kaveh Mazaheri; Sepinud Najian
- Produced by: Kaveh Mazaheri; Soroush Saeedi
- Starring: Susan Parvar; Mahdokht Molaie; Soroush Saeedi; Morteza Khanjani; Mohsen Kiani
- Cinematography: Hamed Hosseini Sangari
- Edited by: Pooyan Sholevar
- Music by: Milad Movahedi
- Release date: 2020
- Running time: 97 minutes
- Countries: Iran; Canada
- Language: Persian

Botox (Persian: بوتاکس) is a 2020 film co-produced by Iran and Canada and directed by Kaveh Mazaheri. It stars Susan Parvar, Mahdokht Molaie, Soroush Saeedi, Morteza Khanjani, and Mohsen Kiani. The film was picked as the best feature at the 38th Torino Film Festival, and co-writers Mazaheri and Sepinud Najian won the award for best screenplay.

== Synopsis ==
Sisters Akram and Azar both lie about their brother's disappearance, telling everyone he fled to Germany. Day after day, the lie becomes bigger and more unmanageable, leading everyone to a dark and mysterious destiny.

== Cast ==
- Susan Parvar as Akram
- Mahdokht Molaie as Azar
- Soroush Saeedi as Emad
- Morteza Khanjani as Saeid
- Mohsen Kiani as Morteza

== Reception ==
=== Awards and nominations ===
Year	Award	Category	Recipient	Result	Ref.
2020	Torino Film Festival	Best Feature Film	Botox	Won	
2020	Torino Film Festival	Best Screenplay	Kaveh Mazaheri, Sepinud Najian	Won	
2022	1st Iranian Cinema Directors' Great Celebration	Best New Film Director	Kaveh Mazaheri	Nominated	
