= Izulu Lami =

2008 South African film in Zulu language

Izulu lami / My Secret Sky
- Directed by: Madoda Ncayiyana
- Screenplay by: Madoda Ncayiyana; Julie Frederikse
- Produced by: DV8 Films; Vuleka Productions
- Starring: Sobahle Mkhabase; Sibonelo Malinga; Tshepang Mohlomi; Sanele Ndawo; Sizwe Xaba; Israel Makoe
- Cinematography: Mike Downie
- Edited by: Kosta Kalarytis
- Music by: Sazi Dlamini
- Release date: 2008
- Running time: 90 minutes
- Country: South Africa
- Language: Zulu

Izulu Lami, titled My Secret Sky in English, is a 2008 South African film made in the Zulu language. It was directed by Madoda Ncayiyana. It follows the story of two children who travel to the city of Durban and become street kids after their mother dies.

== Synopsis ==
Ten-year-old Thembi and her eight-year-old brother, Khwezi, lose their mother. Their aunt is supposed to take care of them, but once she's sold the few things they have, she disappears. The children are left with nothing but a traditional Zulu mat made by their mother before she died. Taking their destiny in her hands, Thembi convinces her brother that they should go to the big city of Durban. But once they arrive, they find themselves adrift in a terrifying metropolis. The very essence of Thembi and Kwezi's bonds are threatened as the city becomes a monster that threatens to completely overwhelm and defeat them.

== Cast ==
- Sobahle Mkhabas as Thembi
- Sibonelo Malinga as Khwezi
- Tshepang Mohlomi as "Chili-Bite"

== Production ==
The film is based on an earlier short film, co-directed by Ncayiyana and Ouida Smit, made in 2001, The Sky in Her Eyes. This film won the Djibril Diop Mambety Prize for best African short film at the 2003 Cannes Film Festival.

== Release ==
In December 2008, the film premiered at the Dubai International Film Festival, opening the inaugural Asia Africa section.

The film was released internationally in 2009 under the title My Secret Sky.

== Awards ==
- December 2008: Nominated, Muhr AsiaAfrica Award at the Dubai International Film Festival
- April 2009: Winner, Dikalo Prize for best feature film at the International Pan-African Film Festival (Festival International du Film Panafricain) in Cannes (Note: FIFP and the Dikalo Awards were established in 2006 by Eitel Basile Ngangue Ebelle; still in existence as of 2022.)
- 2009: Winner, Silver Crow Pheasant Award for best director, Kerala International Film Festival
- 2010: Winner, SAFTA Golden Horn for Best Achievement in Production Design - Feature Film (Simon Joyner) at the South African Film and Television Awards
- 2010: Nominee at SAFTA for various other awards, including Best Feature
- 2011: Sobahle Mkhabas, Sibonelo Malinga, and Tshepang Mohlomi, co-winners of Best Child Actor at the Africa Movie Academy Awards
