= Sedicicorto International Film Festival =

Film festival in Italy

- Location: Forlì, Emilia-Romagna
- Founded: 2004
- Founded by: Gianluca Castellini
- Film titles: Short films
- Hosted by: Sedicicorto Association
- No. of films: 212 selections 46 countries (2020)
- Website: sedicicorto.it

The Sedicicorto International Film Festival (sometimes stylised as 16corto) is a competitive short film festival held each October in the Italian city of Forlì since 2004.

== History ==
In March 2004, the Sedicicorto Association was founded in Forlì by Gianluca Castellini with the aim to launch the first short film festival of the Romagna subregion. The project was born during a directing course held by an Argentinian photographer in Forlì, with Castellini as a participant.

The first edition of the festival was established in October 2004. The event lasted four days and was of national character. Starting from 2005, more sections were added in order to award all categories of short films. In 2020, the nine-day festival presented awards for five sections: foreign films, Italian films, experimental animated films, children's films and films under two minutes. Alongside the official selection of about 200 titles out from 5'000 submissions, the festival screens films out of competition. Since 2018, an Iran short film festival is organised annually along with the Sedicicorto. All screenings are held in the theatres of the old town of Forlì.

The name Sedicicorto is a pun on the Italian expression "se dici corto" (if you say short). When artistic director Gianluca Castellini was taking suggestions for the title, he asked his friends: "If you say short (film), what makes you think?". The title is often stylised as 16corto because sedici in Italian means "sixteen".

== Award winners ==
=== Best foreign film ===
- 2005 – El Soñador, directed by Oskar Santos (Spain)
- 2006 – Talking with Angels, directed by Yousaf Ali Kahn (United Kingdom)
- 2007 – À bras le corps, directed by Katell Quillévéré (France)
- 2008 – Toyland, directed by Jochen Freydank (Germany)
- 2009 – The ground beneath, directed by René Hernandez (Australia)
- 2010 – Venus vs. Me, directed by Nathalie Teirlinck (Belgium)
- 2011 – Land of the Heroes, directed by Sahim Omar Kalifa (Belgium)
- 2012 – Where does the sea flow?, directed by Vitaly Saltykov (Russia)
- 2013 – Curfew, directed by Shawn Christensen (United States)
- 2014 – Xe tải của bố, directed by Mauricio Osaki (Brazil)
- 2015 – Ses souffles, directed by Just Philippot (France)
- 2016 – El Adiós, directed by Clara Roquet (Spain)
- 2017 – Chasse royale, directed by Romane Gueret e Lise Akoka (France)
- 2018 – Deer Boy, directed by Katarzyna Gondek (Poland)
- 2019 – Bajo la sombra del guacarí, directed by Greg Mendez (Colombia)
- 2020 – The Present, directed by Farah Nabulsi (Palestine)

== See also ==
- List of short film festivals
