= Fatai Rolling Dollar =

Nigerian Jùjú singer and songwriter (1927–2013)

- Also known as: Fatai Rolling Dollar
- Born: Olayiwola Fatai Olagunju; 22 July 1927; Isale Eko, Abegede, Lagos, British Nigeria
- Died: 12 June 2013 (aged 85) Lagos, Nigeria
- Genres: Juju, Highlife
- Occupations: Singer-songwriter, instrumentalist
- Instruments: Guitar, vocals

Olayiwola Fatai Olagunju, known professionally as Fatai Rolling Dollar (22 July 1927 – 12 June 2013), was a Nigerian jùjú singer, songwriter and multi-instrumentalist, described by the BBC as a "nationally celebrated performer."

== Biography ==
He started his musical career in 1953 and mentored a number of musicians, including Ebenezer Obey and the late Orlando Owoh. He was known for his dexterity at playing the guitar. Rolling Dollar's last major hit was "Won Kere Si Number Wa".

In 1957, he formed an eight-piece band called Fatai Rolling Dollar and his African Rhythm Band, and they recorded numerous seven-inch singles for Phillips West Africa Records.

== Death ==
He died peacefully in his sleep. He was buried in Ikorodu, Lagos He was the oldest surviving music artist in Nigeria.

== Discography ==
=== Album ===
Year	Album title	Label
2002	Returns	Jazz Hole (Nig) Ltd.
2004	Won Kere Si Number	Jazz Hole (Nig) Ltd.
2010	Beleke	51 Lex Records
