= List of Africa Movie Academy Awards ceremonies =

The following is a list of Africa Movie Academy Awards ceremonies including ceremony date, ceremony host and the Best Film award winner.

== Nomination Venues ==
Year	Nomination Venue	Jury President
2005		
2006		
2007		
2008	Johannesburg, South Africa	
2009	FESPACO, Burkina Faso	
2010	Accra, Ghana	
2011	Nairobi, Kenya	
2012	Banjul, Gambia	Asantewa Olatunji
2013	Lilongwe, Malawi	June Givanni
2014	Johannesburg, South Africa	Steve Ayorinde
2015	Los Angeles, United States	Keith Shiri
2016	Lagos, Nigeria	Shaibu Husseini
2017	Kigali, Rwanda	Berni Goldblat
2018	Wheatbaker Hotel, Lagos, Nigeria	Dorothee Wenner
2019	Lagos, Nigeria	Asantewa Olatunji
2020	Online	Steve Ayorinde
2021	Ebony Life Place, VI, Lagos	Steve Ayorinde
2022		Keith Shiri

== Ceremonies ==
Ceremony	Venue	Date of ceremony	Hosts	Best Film		
Ceremony	Venue	Date of ceremony	Hosts	Title	Director	Nation
1st	Gloryland Cultural Center, Bayelsa State	30 May 2005	Stella Damasus-Aboderin, Segun Arinze	The Mayors	Dickson Iroegbu	Nigeria
2nd	Gloryland Cultural Center, Bayelsa State	29 April 2006	Frank Edoh, Chinyelu Anyiam-Osigwe	Rising Moon	Andy Nwakalor	Nigeria
3rd	Gloryland Cultural Center, Bayelsa State	10 March 2007	Richard Mofe-Damijo, Thami Ngubeni	Sitanda	Izu Ojukwu	Nigeria
4th	Transcorp Hilton Hotels, Abuja, Nigeria	26 April 2008	Osita Iheme & Chinedu Ikedieze, Stephanie Okereke & Ramsey Nouah	Run Baby Run	Emmanuel Apea	Ghana
5th	Gloryland Cultural Center, Bayelsa State	4 April 2009	Kate Henshaw-Nuttal, Julius Agwu	From a Whisper	Wanuri Kahiu	Kenya
6th	Gloryland Cultural Center, Bayelsa State	10 April 2010	Rita Dominic, Basorge Tariah	The Figurine	Kunle Afolayan	Nigeria
7th	Gloryland Cultural Center, Bayelsa State	27 March 2011	Nse Ikpe Etim & Jim Iyke	Viva Riva!	Djo Tunda Wa Munga	(Democratic Republic of the Congo) DR Congo
8th	Expo Centre, Eko Hotel and Suites, Lagos, Nigeria	April 2012	Jimmy Jean-Louis, OC Ukeje	How to Steal 2 Million	Charlie Vundla	South Africa
9th	Gloryland Cultural Center, Bayelsa State	April 2013	Ama K. Abebrese, Dakore Akande & Ayo Makun	Confusion Na Wa	Kenneth Gyang	Nigeria
10th	Gabriel Okara Cultural Centre, Yenagoa, Bayelsa State	24 May 2014	Segun Arinze, Lloyd Nathaniel and Naa Ashorkor.	Of Good Report	Jahmil X.T. Qubeka	South Africa
11th	Boardwalk International Convention Centre, Port Elizabeth, South Africa	26 September 2015	Camille Winbush and Omotola Jalade	Timbuktu	Abderrahmane Sissako	Mauritania
12th	Obi Wali International Conference Centre, Port Harcourt	11 June 2016	Mike Ezuruonye and Kgopedi Lilokoe	Eye of the Storm	Sékou Traoré	Burkina Faso
13th	Eko Hotel and Suites, Lagos, Nigeria	15 July 2017	Nse Ikpe Etim	Félicité	Alain Gomis	Senegal
14th	Intare Conference Arena, Kigali, Rwanda	3 August 2018	Nse Ikpe Etim & Arthur Nkusi	Five Fingers for Marseilles	Michael Matthews	South Africa
15th	Landmark Event Center, Lagos	27 October 2019	Kemi Lala Akindoju, Lorenzo Menakaya, Funnybone	The Mercy of the Jungle	Joël Karekezi	Rwanda
16th	Online	20 December 2020	Lorenzo Menakaya	The Milkmaid	Desmond Ovbiagele	Nigeria
17th	Marriott Hotel, Lagos, Nigeria	28 November 2021	Chigul and Stanley Chibuna	The Gravedigger's Wife	Khadar Ayderus Ahmed	Somalia
18th	Jewel Aeida Hall, Lekki, Lagos	30 October 2022	Funnybone, Chigul, Kachi Offia	Tug of War	Amil Shivji	Tanzania
