= 2015 Ghana Movie Awards =

The 2015 Ghana Movie Awards was held at the Accra International Conference Center on 30 December 2015.

== Awards ==
This is a list of nominations. Winners were announced on 30 December 2015.

Best Actor in a Leading Role: Oris Erhuero – The Cursed Ones; Prince David Osei – Last Night; Adjetey Annan – Cartel; Abraham Attah – Beasts of No Nation; Henry Adofo – Freetown	Best Actress in a Leading Role: Yvonne Nelson – If Tomorrow Never Comes; Nadia Buari – Imogen Brown; Lydia Forson – A Letter From Adam; Martha Ankomah – Shattered Lives; Joselyn Dumas – Silver Rain
Best Actor in a Supporting Role: Jimmy Jean-Louis – The Cursed Ones; Idris Elba – Beasts of No Nation; Van Vicker – I Do; Emmanuel Affadzi – Beasts of No Nation; James Gardiner – Candle in the Wind	Best Actress in a Supporting Role: Rebecca Acheampong (Becca) – If Tomorrow Never Comes; Selorm Galley – The Table; Ama K. Abebrese – The Cursed Ones; Christabel Ekeh – Candle in the Wild; Belinda Baidoo – Silverain
Best Picture: Beasts of No Nation – Tony Tagoe / Danny Damah (Producers); If Tomorrow Never Comes – Yvonne Nelson (Producer); The Cursed Ones – Nicholas K. Lory (Producer); Silverain – Julliet Asante (Producer); I Do – Kafui Danku (Producer); 30 Days In Atlanta – A. Y. (Producer); Candle In The Wind – Abdul Sallam (Producer); Freetown – Mawuli Akpabi / Adam Abel Garret Batty (Producers); Cartel – Dayan Fields (Producer)	Best Directing: Freetown – Garrett Batty; If Tomorrow Never Comes – Pascal Amanfo; Beasts of No Nation – Cary Fukunaga; The Cursed Ones – Nana Obiri Yeboah; 14:32 – Kwesi Apenteng Quartey
Best Cinematography: Cartel – John Passah; If Tomorrow Never Comes – Rex Perbi; Freetown – Jeremy Prusso; Beasts of No Nation – Cary Fukunaga; The Cursed Ones – Nicholas K. Lory	Best Adapted or Original Screenplay: If Tomorrow Never Comes – Pascal Amanfo; Beasts of No Nation – Uzodinma Iweala / Cary Fukunaga; Freetown – Melissa Larson / Garrett Batty; The Cursed Ones – Maximilian Claussen; Silverain – Juliet Asante
Best Production Design: Beasts of No Nation – Tony Tomety / Miles Kristian; If Tomorrow Never Comes – D. J. Vagas; The Cursed Ones – Davide De Stefano; I Do – Ada Chibuife; Freetown – Albert Aidoo / Courage Wormenor	Best Editing: Freetown – Connor O’Malley; Beasts of No Nation – Mikkel E. G. Nielsen; The Cursed Ones – Josh Levinsky; 14:32 – Kimi Frimpong; Cartel – Abby Bawa
Best Music (Original Score): If Tomorrow Never Comes – Berni Anti; Freetown – Robert Allen Elliott; The Cursed Ones – Benjamin Wright; Beasts of No Nation – Dan Romer; Nana Means King – Aleksander Kuzba	Best Music (Original Song): If Tomorrow Never Comes – Berni Anti; I Do – Kobi Rana; The Cursed Ones – Benjamin Wright; Coz Ov Moni – Emmanuel Owusu Bonsu, Mensah Ansah; Why Should I Get Married – D-Black
Best Costume and Wardrobe: If Tomorrow Never Comes – Clara Asantewaa; I Do – Elikem Kumordzie; Beasts of No Nation – Jenny Eagan / Kayoa Afriyie Frimpong; 14:32 – Augustus Edgar Quartey	Best Makeup and Hairstyling: If Tomorrow Never Comes – Jana Siidaus Nahdi; I Do – Christabel Jones; The Cursed Ones – Araba Ansah; Cartel – Lydia Ashietey; Beasts of No Nation – Chris Burgoyne, Rita Parklo
Best Visual Effects: Freetown – Davin Bekins; I Do – Enoch Obiri Opoku; Beasts of No Nation – Kevin Bitters; The Cursed Ones – Ahmed El-Azma; 14:32 – Charles McCarthy	Best Sound Editing and Mixing: Nana Means King – Aleksander Kuzba; Freetown – George Dankwa; Beasts of No Nation – Geoffrey Patterson; If Tomorrow Never Comes – Berni Anti; The Cursed Ones – Gernot Fuhrmann
Best Actor in an African Collaboration: Enyimma Nwigwe – Silverain; Ramsey Nouah – 30 Days In Atlanta; Deyemi Okanlawon – If Tomorrow Never Comes; Nsikan Isaac – The Corned Help	Best Actress in an African Collaboration: Uru Ekeh – Silverain; Mercy Johnson – 30 Days In Atlanta; Patience Ozokwor – Mama Africa; Ini Edo – While You Slept; Rachael Oniga – The Corned Help
Discovery of the Year: Abraham Attah – Beasts of No Nation; Emmanuel Affadzi – Beasts of No Nation; Nana Shangy;- " Only You "; Ophelia Dzidzornu – The Cursed Ones; Jessica Larnyoh – I Do; Stonebwoy – Happy Death Day; General Ntatea – Kalybos In China; Deborah Vanessa – 14:32; Becca – If Tomorrow Never Comes; Belinda Dzata – Royal Diadem; Princess Shyngle – Why Should I Get Married	Best Documentary: Komabu – Za; Dog Tales
Favourite Actor: Majid Michel; John Dumelo; Kalybos; Bismark the Joke; Kwadwo Nkansah; Akrobeto; Adjetey Annan; Nana Shangy; Kwaku Manu; Van Vicker	Favourite Actress: Kyeiwaa (Rose Mensah); Mercy Asiedu; Maame Serwaa; Emelia Brobbey; Nana Ama McBrown; Yvonne Nelson; Jackie Appiah; Ahuɔfe Patri; Juliet Ibrahim; Nadia Buari
Best Short Movie: Gaxorzozor; Love At The Time Of Odwira; Date; Thief; The Cry	Best Animated Short Movie: Nasir (Bribery Gone Wrong); Hogan Toons; The Peculiar Life of a Spider; Agradaa
