= Maponyane =

Maponyane is a surname. Notable people with the surname include:

- Maps Maponyane (born 1990), South African television presenter and actor
- Marks Maponyane (born 1962), South African footballer
- Walter Maponyane (born 1987), South African footballer
