= Nana Means King =

- Directed by: Nana Obiri Yeboah
- Written by: Jeff Wood and Lucy DeLaat
- Produced by: Nana Obiri Yeboah
- Starring: Richard Armah; Prince David Osei; Roxana Zachos
- Cinematography: Nicholas K. Lory
- Edited by: Wojciech Dudzicz
- Production company: Griot Pictures.
- Release date: 6 November 2015
- Running time: 84 minutes
- Country: Ghana
- Language: English

Nana Means King is a 2015 Ghanaian film directed and produced by Nana Obiri Yeboah.

== Plot ==
Nana Kwame, a Ghanaian undocumented migrant working in the UK who experiences a series of setbacks due to a betrayal, finds himself on an odyssey of self-discovery. Stripped of nearly all material possession, housing, and even his dreams of glory, he must find his way through the challenges faced by the displaced and the invisible. It is in this hour of darkness, at his most vulnerable, that his life takes an unexpected turn when he finds beauty and love growing in the concrete wasteland. Through the mirror that is Shauna, he quickly realizes the past can be a prison we create for our own minds. It is only by helping to free Shauna from her prison that he is eventually freed from his own.

== Cast ==
- Armah Richard Armah as Chris Kuma
- David Osei as Kwame
- Roxana Zachos as Shauna

== Awards ==
| Award | Category | Recipient | Result |
|---|---|---|---|
| Ghana Movie Awards | Best Sound Editing and Mixing | Aleksander Kuzba | Nominated |

| Year | Award | Category | Nominated work | Result |
|---|---|---|---|---|
| 2016 | Screen Nation Film and Television Awards | Favourite African UK Movie (made by or featuring significantly British based talent) | Nana Means King | Nominated |
