= 18th Africa Movie Academy Awards =

2022 film awards ceremony

The 2022 African Movie Academy Awards ceremony was held on 21 September 2022 at the Jewel Aeida Hall in Lekki, Lagos. There ceremony was hosted by Funnybone, Chigul, and Kachi Offiah.

The nominees in 26 categories were announced in a ceremony held at the Radisson Hotel in the Government Reserved Area (GRA) of Ikeja, on 30 October 2022 by the head of the jury, Keith Shiri.

== Winners and nominees ==
1. EFERE OZAKO AMAA 2022 AWARD FOR BEST SHORT FILM
  1. Enroute -Burkina Faso
  2. Al-Sit -Sudan
  3. Astel -Senegal
  4. A Lisbon Affair- Angola
  5. Mamadou – Equatorial Guinea
  6. Houminvi – Benin
  7. Men-tally- Nigeria
  8. Tender Threads – Morocco
2. JUBRIL MALAIFIA AMAA 2022 AWARD FOR BEST ANIMATION
  1. On the Surface – Iceland
  2. Opal – Martinique
  3. Kenda – Cote D’Ivoire
  4. No Way Out – Uganda
  5. Skin Like Mine –USA
  6. PTD – Nigeria
3. AMAA 2022 AWARD FOR BEST DOCUMENTARY
  1. Taamaden – Mali
  2. No Simple Way Home -Sudan
  3. The Last Shelter – Mali
  4. No U Turn – Nigeria
  5. Transaction – Zimbabwe
  6. Lobola, a Bride’s True Price?- South Africa
  7. Africa Moot – South Africa
  8. When a Farm Goes Aflame- Nigeria/Germany
4. AMAA 2022 OUSMANE SEMBENE AWARD FOR BEST FILM IN AN AFRICAN LANGUAGE
  1. Borga – Ghana
  2. Tug of War – Tanzania
  3. Tembele – Uganda
  4. Surviving Gaza – South Africa
  5. Alaise – Nigeria
  6. Medicine Man – Kenya
5. AMAA 2022 MICHAEL ANYIAM OSIGWE AWARD FOR BEST FILM BY AN AFRICAN-BORN DIRECTOR LIVING ABROAD
  1. Tope Oshin – Here Love Lies
  2. Obi Emelonye – Money Miss Road
  3. York Fabian Raabe- Borga
  4. Ogo Okpue – A song From the Dark
  5. Robert Peters – The Scar
6. AMAA 2022 AWARD FOR BEST DIASPORA SHORT FILM
  1. Contraband – USA
  2. Slow Pulse – USA
  3. Skin Like Mine – USA
7. AMAA 2022 AWARD FOR BEST DIASPORA DOCUMENTARY
  1. The Rumba King – Peru
  2. Wade in the Water – USA
  3. The Sun Rises in the East – USA
8. AMAA 2022 AWARD FOR BEST DIASPORA NARRATIVE FEATURE
  1. Remember Me: The Mahalia Jackson Story – USA
  2. The Sleeping Negro – USA
9. AMAA 2022 AWARD FOR BEST ACHIEVEMENT IN PRODUCTION DESIGN
  1. Tug Of War
  2. Underbelly - Nigeria
  3. Surviving Gaza
  4. Borga
  5. Swallow
10. AMAA 2022 AWARD FOR BEST ACHIEVEMENT IN COSTUME DESIGN
  1. Swallow
  2. Underbelly
  3. Tug of War
  4. Tembele
  5. Man of God - Nigeria
11. AMAA 2022 AWARD FOR BEST ACHIEVEMENT IN MAKE-UP
  1. Jolly Roger
  2. A Song from The Dark
  3. Surviving Gaza
  4. Underbelly
  5. Angeliena - South Africa
12. AMAA 2022 BEST ACHIEVEMENT IN SOUNDTRACK
  1. Tembele
  2. Ayaanle
  3. Man of God
  4. Surviving Gaza
  5. Tug of War – Tanzania
  6. Almajiri
13. AMAA 2022 BEST ACHIEVEMENT IN VISUAL EFFECTS
  1. Koi-Koi: the Myth
  2. Tug of War
  3. Borga
  4. Tinka’s Story
  5. Surviving Gaza - South Africa
  6. Alaise
14. AMAA 2022 BEST ACHIEVEMENT IN SOUND
  1. The Wave
  2. Surviving Gaza - South Africa
  3. Swallow
  4. Tug of War
  5. Borga
  6. Tembele
15. AMAA 2022 BEST ACHIEVEMENT IN CINEMATOGRAPHY
  1. Tug of War
  2. Tembele – Uganda
  3. Ayaanle
  4. Surviving Gaza
  5. Borga
  6. Road To My Father’s Compound
16. AMAA 2022 AWARD FOR ACHIEVEMENT IN EDITING
  1. Jolly Roger - Nigeria
  2. Angeliena
  3. Tug of War
  4. Borga
  5. Almajiri
  6. Man of God
17. AMAA 2022 AWARD FOR ACHIEVEMENT IN SCREEN PLAY
  1. Road to My Father’s Compound
  2. Surviving Gaza
  3. Jolly Roger
  4. Tug of War
  5. Borga - Ghana
  6. Tembele
18. AMAA 2022 NATIONAL FILM AND VIDEO CENSORS BOARD (NFVB) AWARD FOR BEST NIGERIAN FILM
  1. Man of God - Nigeria
  2. Alaise
  3. Swallow
  4. Jolly Roger
  5. Almajiri
  6. Money Miss Road
19. AMAA 2022 AWARD FOR BEST YOUNG/PROMISING ACTOR
  1. Emmanuel Afffadzi – Borga
  2. Kebirungi Agnes Knight – Tinka’s Story
  3. Amina Mohammed – Ayaanle
  4. Maryam Waziri Salihu – Almajiri
  5. Samke Makhaba – Surviving Gaza
  6. Emmanuel Kuye – Ba Ni (Mud Clan)
20. AMAA 2022 AWARD FOR BEST ACTOR IN A SUPPORTING ROLE
  1. Aphiwe Mkefe – Surviving Gaza
  2. Wale Ojo – A Song from the dark
  3. Adjetey Annag – Borga
  4. Tshamano Sebe – Angeliene
  5. Toyin Osinaike – Jolly Roger
  6. Segun Arinze – Almajiri
  7. Josh2Funny – Money Miss Road
21. AMAA 2022 AWARD FOR BEST ACTRESS IN A SUPPORTING ROLE
  1. Lydia Forson – Borga
  2. Samke Makhoba Surviving Gaza
  3. Ijeoma Grace Agu – Swallow
  4. Siti Amina -Tug of War
  5. Maryam S Wazari – Ba Ni (Mud Clan)
  6. Dorcas Shola Fabson – Man of God
  7. Nse Ikpe Etim – A Song From The Dark
22. AMAA 2022 AWARD FOR BEST ACTOR IN A LEADING ROLE
  1. Patrick Nkakalukanyi -Tembele
  2. Daniel Etim Effiong – Jolly Roger
  3. Gudrun Colombus Mwanyika – Tug of War
  4. Botlhale Mahlangu – Surviving Gaza
  5. Eugene Boateng – Borga
  6. Deyemi Okanlanwo – Swallow
  7. Akah Nnani- Man of God
  8. Aaron Adatsi – Road to My Father’s compound
23. AMAA 2022 AWARD FOR BEST ACTRESS IN A LEADING ROLE
  1. Euodia Samson – Angeliena
  2. Bless Fortune – Road to My Fathers Compound
  3. Osas Ighodaro – Man of God
  4. Ronah Ninsiima – Tembele
  5. Ikhlas Gafur Vora – Tug of War
  6. Vanessa Vanderpuye – A song from the dark
  7. Nanfuna Sharon – The Wave
  8. Eniola Akinbo – Swallow
24. AMAA 2022 AWARD FOR FIRST FEATURE BY A DIRECTOR
  1. Uga Carlini – Angeliena
  2. York Fabian Raabe – Borga
  3. Ogo Okpue – A Song from The Dark
  4. Benedict Yeboah – Road to My Father’s Compound
25. AMAA 2022 AWARD FOR BEST DIRECTOR
  1. Amil Sivji –Tug of War
  2. York-Fabian Raabe – Borga
  3. Bolanle Austen- Peters – Man of God
26. Vusi’Africa Sindane – Surviving Gaza
  1. Uga Carlini – Angeliena
  2. Walter Banger – Jolly Roger
  3. Ahmed Farah – Ayaanle
  4. Morris Mugisha – Tembele
27. AMAA 2022 AWARD FOR BEST FILM
  1. Ayaanle – Somalia
  2. Jolly Roger – Nigeria
  3. Borga – Ghana
  4. Angeliena – South Africa
  5. Tug of War – Tanzania
  6. Man of God – Nigeria
  7. Surviving Gaza – South Africa
  8. Tembele – Uganda
