= 12th Africa Movie Academy Awards =

2016 film awards ceremony

- Date: 11 June 2016
- Site: Obi Wali International Conference Center, Port Harcourt, Rivers State, Nigeria
- Hosted by: Chris Attoh; Mike Ezuruonye; Kgopedi Lilokoe
- Organized by: Africa Film Academy

Highlights
- Best Film: Eye of the Storm
- Most nominations: The Cursed Ones (13)

The 2016 Africa Movie Academy Awards ceremony was held on Saturday 11 June 2016 at the Obi Wali International Conference Center in Port Harcourt, Rivers State. The ceremony recognized and honored excellence among directors, actors, and writers in the film industry. The awards night was hosted by Chris Attoh, Mike Ezuruonye and Kgopedi Lilokoe. It aired live on NTA to over 100 million viewers worldwide.

As part of the pre-AMAA activities, Rivers State Ministry of Culture and Tourism collaborated with the Africa Film Academy to host a sponsorship night to mobilize corporate sponsors for the awards. Other media partners included Africa Magic, OHTV, SABC and ONTV.

== Nominees and winners ==
The nominees for the 12th Africa Movie Academy Awards ceremony were announced on 15 May 2016. The Cursed Ones led with 13 nominations while South African films Tell Me Sweet Something and Ayanda were tied with 9 nods each. Ghana had a total of 15 nominations with 5 films including The Cursed Ones, Rebecca, Cursed Treasure, Daggers of Life and The Peculiar Life of a Spider.

Winners were announced during the ceremony on 11 June 2016 at the Obi Wali International Conference Center. Eye of the Storm won in the categories Best Film, Achievement in Costume Design and Best Actor in a Supporting Role. Drama-thriller The Cursed Ones took home three awards on that same night, including awards for Best Director (Nana Obiri Yeboah), Achievement in Production Design, as well as Cinematography (Nicholas K. Lory).

=== Awards ===
Winners are listed first and highlighted in boldface.

Best Film	Best Director
**Eye of the Storm (Burkina Faso)**; The Cursed Ones (Ghana); Fifty (Nigeria); Ayanda (South Africa); Le Pagne (Niger); Dry (Nigeria); Tell Me Sweet Something (South Africa); Behind Closed Doors (Morocco)	**Nana Obiri-Yeboah & Maximilian Claussen – The Cursed Ones**; Biyi Bandele - Fifty; Sékou Traoré – Eye of the Storm; Sara Blecher – Ayanda; Mousa Hamadou Djingarey – La Pagne; Stephanie Linus – Dry; Akin Omotoso –Tell Me Sweet Something; Muhammed Bensouda – Behind Closed Doors
Best Actor in a Supporting Role	Best Actress in a Supporting Role
**Abidine Dioari – Eye of the Storm**; Joseph Otsiman – The Cursed Ones; Uti Nwachukwu – Breathless; Adeolu Adekola – Taxi Driver; Kenneth Nkosi – Ayanda; Thomas Gumede – Tell Me Sweet Something	**Thishiwe Ziqubu – Tell Me Sweet Something**; Maureen Okpoko – Missing God; Ijeoma Grace Agu – Jimi Bendel/Taxi Driver; Bontte Modiselle – Hear Me Move; Nthati Moshesh – Ayanda; Linda Ejiofor – Out of Luck
Best Actor in a leading role	Best Actress in a leading role
**Daniel K Daniel – A Soldier's Story**; Oris Erhuero – The Cursed Ones; OC Ukeje – Ayanda; Fragrass Assande – Eye of the Storm; Masego Maps Maponyane – Tell Me Sweet Something; Buiferi Yakoubi – La Pagne	**Fulu Mugovhani – Ayanda**; Zined Odieb – Behind Closed Doors; Adesua Etomi – Falling; Maimouna N'Daiye – Eye of the Storm; Nse Ikpe-Etim, Ireti Doyle, Omoni Oboli, Dakore Akande – Fifty; Nomzamo Mbatha – Tell Me Sweet Something
Achievement in Costume Design	Achievement in Makeup
**Eye of the Storm**; Oshimiri; The Cursed Ones; Ayanda; A Soldier's Story	**A Soldier's Story**; Oshimiri; The Cursed Ones; Missing God
Achievement in Cinematography	Achievement in Production Design
**The Cursed Ones**; Fifty; Ayanda; Eye of the Storm; Tell Me Sweet Something	**The Cursed Ones**; Ayanda; Missing God; A Soldier's Story; Out of Luck
Achievement in Editing	Achievement in Screenplay
**Hear Me Move**; Behind Closed Doors; Rebecca; The Cursed Ones; Eye of the Storm	**Tell Me Sweet Something**; The Cursed Ones; The Visit; Eye of the Storm; Beyond Blood
Best Film in An African Language	Best Nigerian Film
**Missing God (Nigeria)**; Bala Bala Sese (Uganda); Brotherhood Eye (Mali); Cursed Treasure (Ghana); Wako (Uganda); Daggers of Life (Ghana)	**Dry**; Beyond Blood; Fifty; Missing God; Falling; O-Town
Best Short Film	Best Animation
**Meet The Parents (Nigeria/Canada)**; Encounter (Nigeria); Le Chemin (Côte d'Ivoire); Blood Taxi (Nigeria); Nourah The Holy Light (Burkina Faso); Ireti; Life of Nigerian couple	**The Pencil (Burkina Faso)**; The Peculiar Life of a Spider (Ghana); Funsie Fast Fingers (Nigeria); Lazare Sie Pale (Burkina Faso)
Best Documentary	Best Film by an African Living Abroad
**The Fruitless Tree (Niger)**; My Fathers Funeral (Cameroon); Nollywood (Nigeria); Tchindas (Cape Verde); Runs ‘I too Seek The Horizon’ (Nigeria/UK); Camera/Woman (Morocco)	**Lambadina (Ethiopia/USA)**; Skinned (Liberia/USA); LAPD African Cop (USA/Nigeria); Boxing Day (USA/Nigeria); MONA (Nigeria/UK)
Best Diaspora Short	Best Diaspora Documentary
**Across The Track (USA)**; Raptors (USA); Lines (USA)	**Spirits of Rebellion (USA)**; America's Blues (USA); Can You Dig This (USA)
Best Diaspora Feature	Best Soundtrack
**Ben & Ara (USA)**; America Is Still the Place (USA); Luv Don’t Live Here (USA)	**O-Town**; Tell Me Sweet Something; The Cursed Ones; Hear Me Move; Le Pagne
Best Visual Effects	Best Sound
**Oshimiri**; Hear Me Move; Stupid Movie; House Arrest (Uganda); A Soldier's Story	**Fifty**; Eye of the Storm; The Cursed Ones; Behind Closed Doors (Morocco); Rebecca (Ghana); Falling
Most Promising Actor	Best First Feature Film by a Director
**Zubaidat Ibrahim Fagge - Dry**; Nyanso Dzedze - Hear Me Move; Ophelia Klenam Dzidzornu - The Cursed Ones; Ifu Ennada - O-Town; Eve Esin - Oshimiri	**Beyond Blood** by Greg Odutayo; MONA by Anthony Abuah; 8 Bars and a Clef by Chioma Onyenwe

=== Honorary awards ===
==== Lifetime Achievement ====
- Richard Mofe Damijo
- Joke Silva and Olu Jacobs
- Tony Akposhore

=== Multiple nominations and awards ===
The following films received multiple nominations:

- 13 nominations: The Cursed Ones
- 10 nominations: Eye of the Storm
- 9 nominations: Tell Me Sweet Something and Ayanda
- 6 nominations: Fifty
- 5 nominations: Hear Me Move, Missing God, and A Soldier's Story
- 4 nominations: Dry and Oshimiri
- 3 nominations: O-Town

The following films received multiple awards:

- 3 awards: Eye of the Storm and The Cursed Ones
- 2 awards: Dry, Tell Me Sweet Something, and Soldier's Story

== Dignitaries ==
Dignitaries present during the occasion were Governor of Rivers State Ezenwo Nyesom Wike, first lady Eberechi Wike, former Senate President David Mark, Minister of Information Lai Mohammed and veteran actor Pete Edochie.
