= Ndidi Okonkwo Nwuneli =

Nigerian social entrepreneur

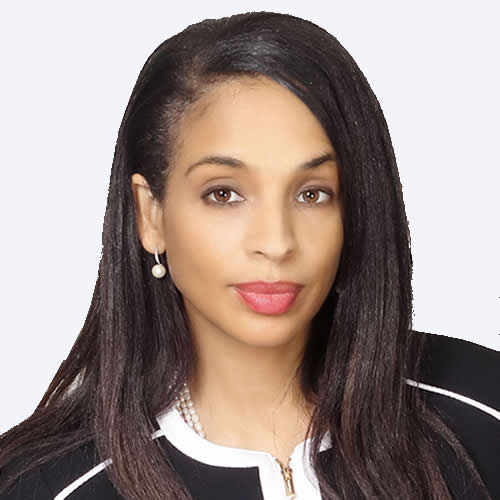
- Ndidi Okonkwo Nwuneli
- Born: 22 March 1975 (age 51); Enugu, Nigeria
- Occupation: Social Entrepreneur
- Years active: 25
- Known for: LEAP Africa, AACE Food Processing & Distribution Ltd, Sahel Consulting Agriculture & Nutrition Ltd, and African Food Changemakers
- Notable work: She started her career at McKinsey & Company’s Chicago Office.
- Awards: Author, Food Entrepreneurs in Africa, 2021; Author, Social Innovation In Africa, 2016

Dr. Ndidi Okonkwo Nwuneli (//; born 22 March 1975) is a Nigerian entrepreneur, an expert on African agriculture and nutrition, philanthropy, and social innovation. Nwuneli has established several influential organizations that work across Africa, including LEAP Africa, Sahel Consulting Agriculture & Nutrition Ltd, AACE Food Processing & Distribution Ltd, African Food Changemakers, and Wealth4Impact.

She is the former President and Chief Executive Officer of the ONE Campaign, a global advocacy organization focused on fighting for the investments to ensure economic opportunities and healthier lives in Africa. She started her career at McKinsey & Company’s Chicago Office.

== Early life and education ==
Dr. Nwuneli was born on 22 March 1975, at the University of Nigeria Teaching Hospital in Enugu, Nigeria to a Nigerian professor of pharmacology—Paul Obuekwe Okonkwo and an American professor of history—Rina Okonkwo.

Her father is from Awka, Anambra and her mother is originally from New York City. They met at Cornell University in 1965. Her parents were educators by profession. They taught and mentored students with the goal of improving the Nigerian Education System. In an interview with the National Mirror Nwuneli explains, "I was born the third of five children. My parents[....]exposed my siblings and I to the concept of patriotism and service from very young ages....during the dark years of the late General Sani Abacha years, when many professors fled outside the country, my parents stuck it out, going for many months without salaries. Even with these challenges, holidays in our home were devoted to giving to others; trips to orphanages and other charity organizations formed a critical part of our socialization".

By 1997, she was enrolled at Harvard Business School (HBS). While there, she received both the Harvey Fellowship and the National Black MBA Association Graduate Scholarship, both recognizing her academic accomplishments. Her extracurricular activities at Harvard include founding and co-chairing the annual African Business Conference; Vice President of Faculty and Student Affairs for the Africa Business Club; International Liaison for the African American Student Union; and Publicity Chair for the Christian Association. She earned an MBA in 1999 at the age of 24.

== Career ==
Nwuneli's career began in her junior year at The University of Pennsylvania when she held a Summer Business Analyst position with McKinsey & Company in New York. In 1995, she was offered a full-time position at McKinsey as a Business Analyst working out of Chicago, Illinois. She also worked for McKinsey in their office in Johannesburg, South Africa. Her work with McKinsey in 1997 led to the management and training of police officers across 25 South African Police Service stations, as well as an increase in criminal convictions and a reduction in crime rates.

=== Work in Nigeria ===
In 1999, Dr. Nwuneli worked as the Lead Consultant for The Ford Foundation on a project focusing on Nigeria's largest microcredit institutions, COWAN and FADU. That year, she rejoined McKinsey and worked on client service teams, consulting for consumer goods companies and large American retailers. In 2000, she resigned from her position at McKinsey and returned to Nigeria as the executive director for the FATE Foundation (founded by Nigerian businessman, Fola Adeola). In an interview with HBS African America Alumni Association about engaging female entrepreneurs, she explains: "Nigeria has some of the most entrepreneurial people in the world but access to financing, networks, and growth remain a challenge[...] I believe empowering women to start and grow their businesses is critical to Nigeria's development, but educating women is the real silver bullet."

In 2002, she founded two nonprofits, LEAP (Leadership, Effectiveness, Accountability, Professionalism) Africa and Ndu Ike Akunuba (NIA), Igbo words which translate in English to life, strength, and wealth. NIA's focus is on female empowerment—inspiring university students in Southeastern Nigeria to live full and meaningful lives. LEAP Africa is a youth-focused leadership development nonprofit organization. LEAP provides training on leadership, ethics and civics. As the founder of the organization, she has been invited to speak at the UN Commission for Social Development, the World Economic Forum and the Clinton Global Initiative.

LEAP has worked in partnership with the Ford Foundation, Citi Foundation, World Bank, United States Government, UK Foreign & Commonwealth Office, ALI (Aspen Institute's Africa Leadership Initiative), Nokia, and the International Youth Foundation. Nwuneli was LEAP Africa's founder and chief executive officer from 2002 to 2007 and is still an active board member in the organization.

Dr. Nwuneli's goal is to turn West Africa's food to its new gold by engaging the agricultural landscape and building its ecosystem.

Dr. Nwuneli was named president and CEO of the ONE Campaign in February 2024, succeeding Gayle Smith on 2 April 2024.

On 23 May 2024, Dr. Nwuneli was among the guests invited to the state dinner hosted by U.S. President Joe Biden in honor of President William Ruto at the White House.

On the 13 August 2025, the African Development Fund announced the appointment of Nwuneli as a champion for its 17th replenishment cycle, ADF-17. In this role she is expected to bring a powerful voice and trusted leadership that will help "elevate the fund's visibility, highlight Africa's development priorities, and reinforce the importance of long-term, impactful investment across the continent," according to Valerie Dabady, African Development Bank Manager for Resource Mobilization and Partnerships.

== Other activities ==
Dr. Nwuneli serves on the boards of the Rockefeller Foundation (2019), Fondation Chanel, Stanbic IBTC Group (2023), the ONE Campaign, and the Bridgespan Group. She previously served on the Boards of Godrej Consumer Products India, Nestle Nigeria Plc, Nigerian Breweries (Heineken) Plc, the African Philanthropy Forum, the Global Alliance for Improved Nutrition (GAIN), Helios-Fairfax Africa, and Cornerstone Insurance.

== Awards and recognition ==
- Alumni Achievement Award from Harvard Business School, 2021
- Named amongst Schwab Foundation's Social Innovators, 2020
- Honoree of the Global Fund for Women during their 25th anniversary celebration in San Francisco, 2013
- Winner of the Harvard Business School Nigeria Business Club 2013 Leading Social Entrepreneur Award
- Forbes: 20 Youngest Powerful Women In Africa, 2011
- Excellence Award from Anambra State, 2011
- Selected for Harvard Business School's Africa Business Club's Excellence Award, 2007
- Selected as Young Manager of the Year by This Day Newspapers, 2005
- Received a national honor – Member of the Order of the Federal Republic – from the president of the Federal Republic of Nigeria on December 16, 2004
- Selected as a young global leader by the World Economic Forum, Davos; 2004
- Selected as a global leader of tomorrow by the World Economic Forum, Davos, Switzerland; 2002

== Author and research ==
- Author, Food Entrepreneurs in Africa: Scaling Resilient Agriculture Businesses (routledge.com), 2021
- Author, Social Innovation In Africa: A practical guide for scaling impact - 1s (routledge.com), 2016
- Author, Working for God in the Marketplace, 2005

== Publications ==
- Author, Food Entrepreneurs in Africa: Scaling Resilient Agriculture Businesses, 2021
- Author, Social Innovation in Africa; 2016
- Editor, Passing the Baton, LEAP Africa; 2011
- Lead Author, Building a Culture of Ethics: A Practical Guide for African Leaders in the Public, Private and Nonprofits Sectors, LEAP Africa; 2009
- Editor, Rage for Change: A Practical Guide for African youth who Desire to Make a Difference, LEAP Africa; 2008
- Editor/Co-Author, Get on Board: A Practical Guide to Establishing & Sustaining High-Impact Boards of Directors, Farafina; 2007
- Lead Author, Defying the Odds: Case Studies of Nigerian Companies that have Survived Generations, LEAP Africa, 2006
- Articles on leadership, management and ethics: Under the Tree of Talking (Funded by the British Council), Journal of Convergence, Farafina, Business Day, The Guardian and Business in Africa Magazine; 2003-2007
