= Maimouna N'Diaye =

French actress and film director

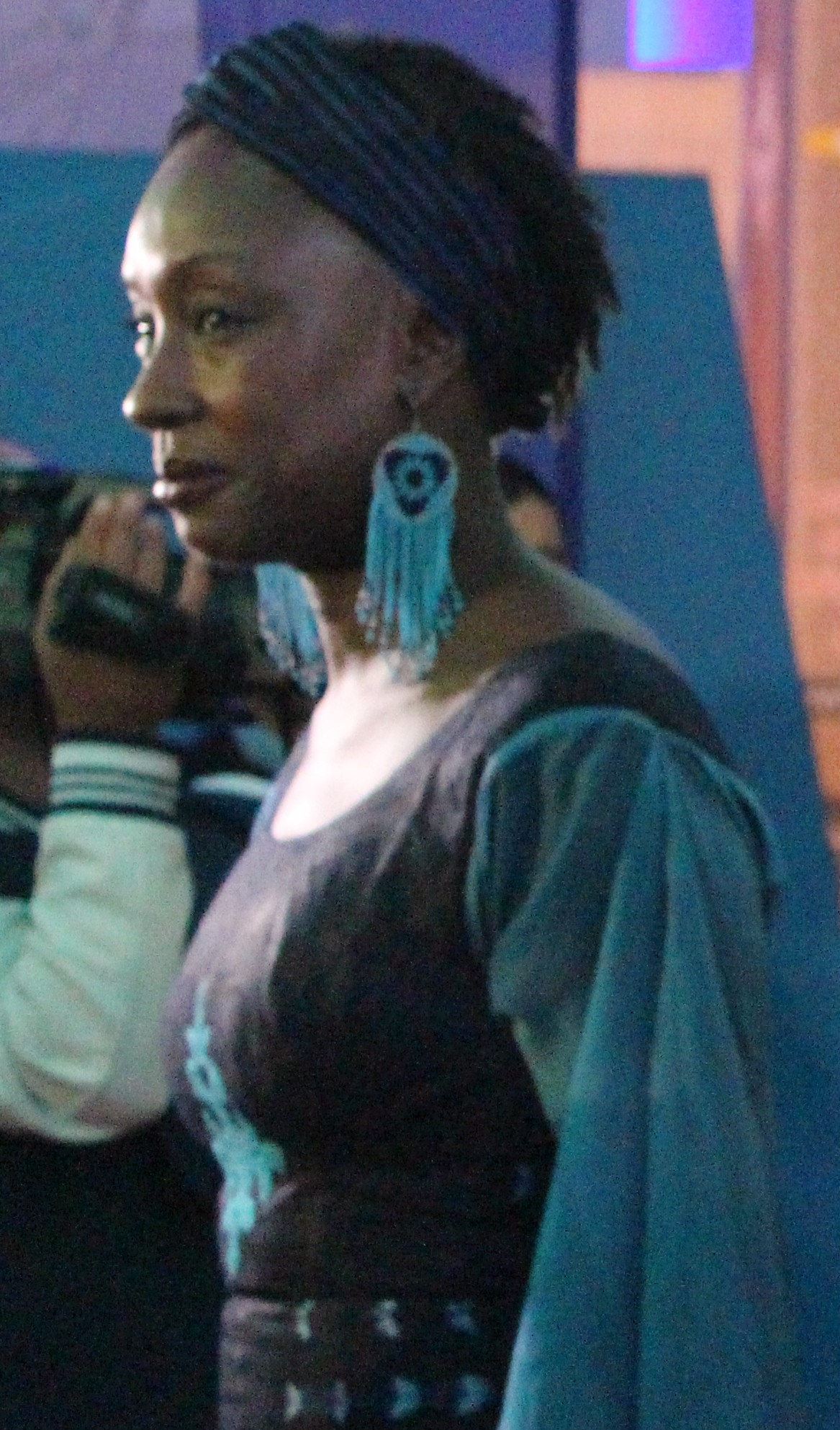
- Maimouna N'Diaye in 2018
- Born: Paris, France
- Other names: Mouna N'Diaye
- Occupation(s): Actress, Documentary Director
- Years active: 1991–present

Maimouna N'Diaye is a Franco-Senegalese actress and film director. She is best known for her leading role in the film Eye of the Storm (2015), for which she received critical acclaim.

In 2019, N'Diaye was appointed as a jury member of the main competition in the 72nd annual Cannes Film Festival.

== Career ==
In 2015, she starred in Eye of the Storm, a film that opened the Panafrican Film and Television Festival of Ouagadougou. She won the 2015 FESPACO award for best actress. She was also nominated for best actress at the AMAA awards in Nigeria. In March 2017, she opened the 14th Festival Divercine through her film Eye of the Storm in Bytowne cinema, Canada. In a 2016 interview with Bukinabe 24, she decried the lack of internal fund for Bukinabe films, explaining that the industry should be viable enough for financial supply and stability.

=== Filmography ===
- Toubab Bi (1991)
- La Chasse aux Papillons (1992)
- Kirikou and the Sorceress (1998)
- L'Oeil du Cyclone (2015)
- Bol d'amour
- Super Cops

=== Accolades ===
- Best actress - AMAA (nomination)
- Best actress - FESPACO (won)

== Personal life ==
N'Diaye parents are of Nigerian and Senegalese origin. She spent her childhood in Guinea, Côte d'Ivoire and Burkina Faso. She later emigrated to France to study Theater. In an interview, she disclosed that she decided to start a film career in Africa because of the limited opportunities available to Africans in Europe. She also explained that even though more opportunities seem to exist for men than women in the industry, she is poised to find relevance.
