= Filippe Savadogo =

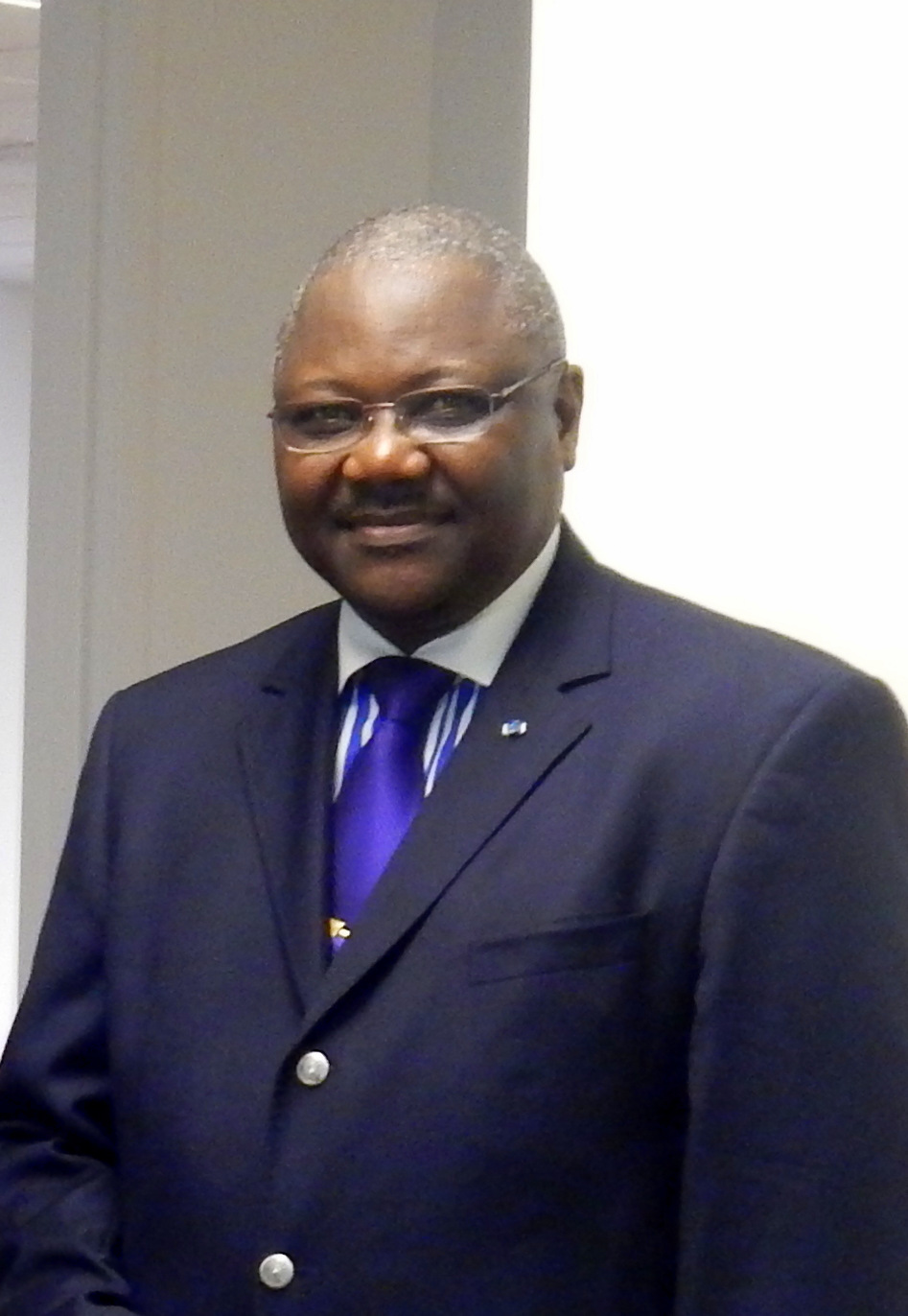
Filippe Savadogo (2014)

Filippe Savadogo is a Burkinabe film critic and politician.

== Career ==
Between 2007 and 2011, he was the Minister of Culture, Tourism and Communication for Burkina Faso. He has also served as ambassador of his country to many European countries including France. He is presently a permanent observer to the United Nations. Since 2014, he has been a member of the jury board at the Africa Movie Academy Awards.
