= Princess Shyngle =

Gambian actress

- Born: Princess Shyngle; 25 December 1990 (age 35); Banjul, Gambia
- Occupations: Actress, producer
- Years active: 2011–present

Princess Shyngle (born 25 December 1990) is a Gambian actress and producer.

== Early life and education ==
Princess Shyngle was born in the Gambia. Her father, Winston Shyngle, was a deputy mayor in the Gambia and her mother was a businesswoman. She had both her primary and secondary school education in Gambia, a small country in West Africa.

== Acting career ==
After emerging as the third best at the Next Movie Star Africa competition, Princess Shyngle has starred in several movies since then, especially in Ghana. Princess Shyngle was nominated for "the discovery of the year" at the 2015 Ghana Movie Awards. She has also starred in a couple of movies with other Ghanaian movie stars like Juliet Ibrahim, John Dumelo, Martha Ankomah, and D-Black. Her major projects include Why Do Men Get Married, the Dormitory 8 series, The 5 Brides series, and The Hidden Fantasy. In 2020, she launched her reality TV show named Discovering Princess Shyngle.

== Personal life ==
Shyngle has become very popular for her tiny waist and controversial statements on social media. Princess has been rumored to be in a relationship with Nigerian afrobeat artist, Davido. In one occurrence, she took to her social media page to announce her engagement to her Senegalese beau. The marriage has been hit with so many controversies as she once called out her boyfriend for cheating in the relationship and later apologized. Princess revealed she is pregnant and has been struggling to pay her bills since her partner was arrested by the police.
