= Nicholas K. Lory =

British film producer and cinematographer

- Born: 29 March 1989 (age 36); Oxford, England
- Education: University of Oxford, Durham University
- Occupations: Film Producer; Cinematographer
- Years active: 2009–present
- Known for: The Cursed Ones

Nicholas K. Lory (born 29 March 1989) is a British film producer and cinematographer. He won an African Movie Academy Award and a Screen Nation Award for the 2016 film The Cursed Ones.

Nicholas K. Lory is the co-founder of Zissou Pictures Ltd. where he works as a producer.

== Early life ==
Nicholas K. Lory was born on 29 March 1989 in Oxford, England. He studied Philosophy and Psychology at Durham University and Social Anthropology at University of Oxford.

== Awards and nominations ==
Year	Award	Category	Nominated work	Result
2016	12th Africa Movie Academy Awards	Best Film	The Cursed Ones	Nominated
2016	12th Africa Movie Academy Awards	Best Cinematography	The Cursed Ones	Won
2016	Golden Movie Awards	Overall Golden Movie	The Cursed Ones	Won
2016	Golden Movie Awards	Golden Cinematography	The Cursed Ones	Nominated
2016	Screen Nation Film and Television Awards	Favourite UK African Movie	The Cursed Ones	Won
2016	Canada International Film Festival	Award of Excellence for a Foreign Film	The Cursed Ones	Won
2015	Ghana Movie Awards	Best Cinematography	The Cursed Ones	Nominated
2015	Ghana Movie Awards	Best Film	The Cursed Ones	Nominated

== Publications ==
Nicholas K. Lory is the author of the book On the accusation of negativity in Nietzsche’s ethics: A refutation (2012).
