= Shaibu Husseini =

- Born: 4 December 1970 (age 55)
- Occupations: Film critic, journalist, performing artist, lecturer

Shaibu Husseini (born 4 December 1970) is a Nigerian journalist, performing artist, cultural administrator, PR and media expert and film curator. He holds a doctorate degree in mass communication from the University of Lagos and was educated at the Lagos State University School of Communication and at the University of Lagos, where he earned a BSc (first class) in mass communication and an MSc (distinction) respectively. He has been described as the "most consistent documentarist" on Nollywood-related topics. In 2010, he published his book, titled Moviedom, that narrates the developmental stages of Nollywood. He was the head of the jury board at the 2017 Africa Movie Academy Awards.

== Career ==
Husseini is an editor at large for The Guardian newspaper. In 2014, he was honoured for his contributions to the development of Nigerian Film Industry by Nollywood Film Festival in Germany. He has been the chairman of the college of screeners and a member of the jury board of Africa Movie Academy Awards for many years.

== Affiliations ==
- Dance Guild of Nigeria (chairman)
- National Dance Company of Nigeria (Pioneer member)
- Federation of International Film Critics (FIPRESCI) (Secretary General, Nigerian faction)
- Federation of African Film Critic, (Secretary General, Nigerian faction)
- International Visitor Leadership Program (alumni)
- The Berlinale Talent Campus press (alumni)
- Nigeria Oscar Selection Committee
