= Assassin (2023 film) =

2023 film by Jesse Atlas

- Theatrical release poster
- Directed by: Jesse Atlas
- Written by: Jesse Atlas; Aaron Wolfe
- Based on: Let Them Die Like Lovers by: Jesse Atlas; Aaron Wolfe
- Produced by: Joel Shapiro; Jeff Elliott; Alex Eckert; Thomas Sjolund; Najeeb Khuda; Gavin Lurie
- Starring: Nomzamo Mbatha; Dominic Purcell; Bruce Willis
- Cinematography: Bryan Koss
- Edited by: Philip Harrison
- Music by: Mark Tewarson
- Production companies: Endless Media; Brickell & Broadbridge International; magiCity Studios; Altamira Media; 120db Films
- Distributed by: Saban Films
- Release date: March 31, 2023
- Running time: 87 minutes
- Country: United States
- Language: English
- Box office: $132,005

Assassin is a 2023 American science fiction action film starring Nomzamo Mbatha, Dominic Purcell and Bruce Willis in his final film role. It was directed by Jesse Atlas, in his feature film directorial debut, written by Aaron Wolfe, and is based on Atlas and Wolfe's short film Let Them Die Like Lovers.

Assassin was released by Saban Films in select theaters and VOD on March 31, 2023.

== Premise ==
A private military operation, led by Valmora, invents futuristic microchip tech that enables the mind of an agent to inhabit the body of another person to carry out covert, deadly missions. But when Agent Sebastian is killed during a secret mission, his wife, Alexa, must take his place in an attempt to bring the man responsible to justice.

== Cast ==
- Nomzamo Mbatha as Alexa
- Bruce Willis as Valmora
- Dominic Purcell as Adrian
- Andy Allo as Mali
- Mustafa Shakir as Sebastian
- Fernanda Andrade as Olivia
- Eugenia Kuzmina as Trainer
- Hannah Quinlivan as Special Agent

== Production ==
On April 29, 2021, it was announced that Bruce Willis would star in Soul Assassin, a thriller film in which Nomzamo Mbatha and Dominic Purcell entered negotiations to star. Filming began on June 15, 2021, in Bessemer, Alabama. In July 2021, Saban Films acquired the distribution rights to the film in North America, Australia, New Zealand, Austria, Germany, Switzerland, Spain, France, South Africa, and Scandinavia. In the same month, Barry Jay Minoff was cast in an undisclosed role, while Jeff Elliott was revealed to have produced the film, through Endless Media Brickell & Broadbridge International, alongside 120 dB Films. In August 2021, Mustafa Shakir was cast in an undisclosed role. The film was retitled to Die Like Lovers and later to its current title Assassin. By May 2022, Hannah Quinlivan and Fernanda Andrade were cast. Assassin is the final film of Willis's career. He retired from acting in 2022 after he was diagnosed with aphasia, and was diagnosed with frontotemporal dementia in 2023.

== Release ==
Assassin was released by Saban Films in select theaters and VOD on March 31, 2023. The film was originally set to be released in September 2022, under the title Die Like Lovers.

=== Box office ===
As of April 19, 2025, Assassin grossed $132,005 in Turkey, South Africa, the United Arab Emirates, Russia, and Colombia.

=== Critical reception ===
On the review aggregator website Rotten Tomatoes, 9% of 11 critics' reviews are positive, with an average rating of 4/10.

Dennis Harvey, of Variety, gave the film a negative review, writing that "the multinational cast seems assembled for reasons other than serving defined character needs. None of them are able to rise above the vague material". Richard Roeper, of Chicago Sun-Times, gave the film a 2/5 rating, saying "it's sad to see Bruce Willis in his final film, lacking his trademark twinkle".
