= Fred Amugi =

Ghanaian actor

Fred Nii Amugi
- Born: 5 November 1948 (age 77); Accra, Ghana
- Occupations: Actor, singer
- Years active: 1970–present
- Known for: Beasts of No Nation, The Cursed Ones, Holby City
- Awards: Accra International Film Festival, best actor 1994. Order of the Volta 2008, Golden Movie Awards 2016

Fred Nii Amugi (born 5 November 1948) is a Ghanaian born veteran actor best known for his roles in Holby City, Beasts of No Nation and The Cursed Ones. He rose to prominence for his role in 1985 television series "Opinto".

== Early life ==
Fred Amugi was born at Teshie, Accra, Ghana on 5 November 1948. He attended Broaks basic and Junior high School. He then attended Takoradi Senior High School and Nungua Senior High school. He joined the civil service for thirty-three years and served as acting director of Supply in Ghana's Ministry of Finance.

== Career ==
Amugi began his acting career in 1970 in Drama and Documentaries until 1985 when he starred in his first movie "Opinto". The television series brought him into the limelight.

Amugi has appeared in numerous movie roles, including local Ghanaian movies, Shoe Shine Boy (2013), Nyame Bekyere 1&2 (2015), Menua Paa Nie (2016), Housekeepers (2016) among others. His first international role came in 2005 when he played the character Kwame Attakora in the BBC drama Holby City. He later starred in Netflix 2015 movie, Beasts of No Nation as "Pastor". Amugi played the character Pastor Uchebo in the 2015 British award-winning movie "The Cursed Ones".

== Filmography ==
Key
†	Denotes projects that have not yet been released

=== Film ===
Year	Film	Role	Notes
1989	African Timber		
1992	The Other Side of the Rich	Stephen Kodua	
2001	The Scent of Danger		
2004	Welcome Home	Black Doctor	
2005	Madam Pink	Police Chief	
2007	In the Eyes of My Husband	Nana Boateng	Direct-to-video
2009	Punctured Hope	Togbe	
2011	The Destiny of Lesser Animals	Oscar Darko	
2011	Ties That Bind		
2014	Broken Mirror		
2015	Pieces of Me	Board Member	Direct-to-video
2015	The Impossible		Completed
2015	Beasts of No Nation	Pastor	
2015	Chronicles of Odumkrom: The Headmaster	Kofi Bediako	
2015	The Cursed Ones	Pastor Uchebo	
2016	Beautiful Ruins		
2016	Housekeepers		
2017	Sala		
2017	Keteke	Old Man	
2017	The Hero Film	Mr. Boateng	
2018	Lucky	Father	
2019	Bigman Wahala	Nana	
2020	Gold Coast Lounge	Adwene Mu Ti	
2020	Aloe Vera	Mr. Aloemele	
2020	1st Kings	Nana Nyansa	Short film
2020	Agadez	Imam	Short film
2021	Borga	Priest	
2022	Terminus†	Major Nuhu	Completed
2023	Nine	Witch Doctor	
2024	Evor	Mr. Amable	Drama

=== Television ===
Year	Film	Role	Notes
2005	Holby City	Kwame Attakora	Episode: "Tuesday's Child"
2016	Shampaign	Ankrah	

== Awards and nominations ==
Year	Award	Category	Nominated work	Result
1994	Accra International Film Festival	Best Actor		Won
2008	Order of the Volta	Ghana National Award for Acting		Won
2016	Ghana Movie Awards	Best Actor In Supporting Role	Beautiful Ruins	Nominated
2016	Golden Movie Awards	Golden Supporting Actor in a Drama	The Cursed Ones	Won
2016	Golden Movie Awards	Golden Supporting Actor in a Drama	Beautiful Ruins	Nominated
