= Steve Ayorinde =

Nigerian journalist

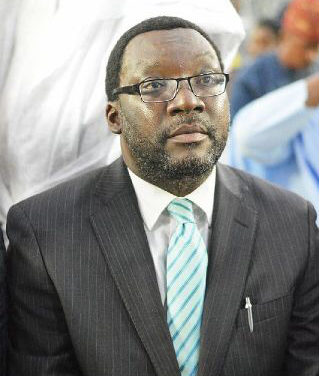

Former Lagos State Commissioner for Information & Stretegy; Tourism, Arts & Culture
- In office October 2015 – May 2019

Personal details
- Born: 9 July 1970 (age 56) Ibadan, Oyo State Nigeria
- Education: Obafemi Awolowo University, University of Lagos, University of Leicester
- Profession: Journalist / Media Consultant

Steve Oluseyi Ayorinde // (born 9 July 1970) is a Nigerian journalist and author who served as the commissioner for tourism, arts and culture in Lagos State from 2018 to 2019. Before that, he was the commissioner for information and strategy, sworn in by Governor Akinwunmi Ambode on 19 October 2015 and served until 2018. He was also previously the managing director/editor-in-chief of the National Mirror newspaper, and before that, the editor of The Punch newspaper in Nigeria.

He is a film and art critic who has served on the juries for some of the world's most recognised film festivals and awards, such as the Toronto International Film Festival, Cannes Film Festival, Berlin International Film Festival, AMAA and Mumbai International Film Festival.

== Education ==
A product of Obafemi Awolowo University, Ile-Ife, Ayorinde was also educated at the University of Lagos, Akoka, and the University of Leicester in the UK, where he earned a master's degree in globalisation and communications. Well-travelled and a polyglot, he is a European Union fellow at the Foundation Journalists-in-Europe (1997–98), a comprehensive one-year training scheme for mid-career journalists. He is also an alumnus of the State Department’s International Visitors’ program (IVP) in the United States, the Goethe Institute, Berlin, and the University of Siena for Foreigners, Italy.

== Career in journalism ==
As a journalist, author, publisher, and media consultant, Ayorinde has more than 24 years of experience and has won many awards.

His career started in 1991 at The Guardian newspapers in Lagos, Nigeria, which was renowned as the flagship in the Nigerian media space at the time. He was a pioneer staff of The Comet where he edited the arts, entertainment and media section (1999–2003), after which he joined The Punch, where he worked in various capacities, first as arts editor, then as United Kingdom correspondent, member of the editorial board and ultimately as editor of the daily title. It was at The Punch where he started his popular back-page column, "Something Before the Weekend", which ran every Thursday. He later worked at the National Mirror, first as the editor/executive director in charge of publications and later as managing director/editor-in-chief between 2010 and 2013. Since then, he has practiced as a syndicated columnist, media consultant and strategist. He served as the director of media and communications for the Akinwunmi Ambode campaign organisation between September 2014 and April 2015. He is also the promoter of The Culture Newspaper (TCN), the first arts and culture publication in Nigeria.

== Author ==
Ayorinde is the author of three books: Masterpieces: A Critic’s Timeless Report (Spectrum Books, 2008); Abokede: The Man, The Hill, The City (ArtPillar Books, 2011) and Cascade of Change: A Decade of Liberal Thoughts (Liberal Publishing, 2015). He also edited For Law, For Country: Conversations with the Bar and the Bench (Global Media Mirror Publications, 2012).

Ayorinde has served the Nigerian Guild of Editors in various capacities, including assistant secretary general, vice president (west) and deputy president.

== Personal life ==
Ayorinde is married to Temitope, and they have three children.
