= The Cursed Ones =

2015 film by Nana Obiri Yeboah

- Film Poster for The Cursed Ones
- Directed by: Nana Obiri Yeboah
- Written by: Maximilian Claussen
- Produced by: Nicholas K. Lory
- Starring: Oris Erhuero; Jimmy Jean-Louis; Ama K. Abebrese; Fred Amugi; David Dontoh; Rama Brew; Joseph Otsiman; Ophelia Dzidzornu
- Cinematography: Nicholas K. Lory
- Edited by: Josh Levinsky
- Music by: Benjamin Wright
- Production company: Zissou Pictures Ltd.
- Release date: 6 November 2015 (Film Africa)
- Running time: 95 minutes
- Country: UK / Ghana
- Language: English

The Cursed Ones is a 2015 British film that was directed by Nana Obiri Yeboah and produced by Nicholas K. Lory. The original screenplay was written by Maximilian Claussen. The film tells the story of a disillusioned reporter and an idealistic young pastor, who fights to free a girl accused of witchcraft from the clutches of a corrupt system and superstition in the heart of West Africa.

The film received 3 Africa Movie Academy Awards in 2016 for Best Director, Best Cinematography, and Best Production Design. It was nominated for 13 AMAA awards in total, making it the most nominated film of 2016.

== Cast ==
- Oris Erhuero as Godwin Ezeudu
- Jimmy Jean-Louis as Paladin
- Ama K. Abebrese as Chinue
- Joseph Otsiman as Pastor John Moses
- Ophelia Dzidzornu as Asabi
- Fred Amugi as Pastor Uchebo
- David Dontoh as Bartender
- Rama Brew as Village Elder
- Akofa Edjeani Asiedu

== Production ==
The film was shot entirely on location in Ghana. The majority of the film was shot in a single village in the Eastern Region of Ghana.

== Release ==
The Cursed Ones screened at the Hackney Picturehouse in London, England as part of the official selection for the Royal African Society's Film Africa festival. In 2016 the film also screened in competition at the Pan African Film Festival in Los Angeles, the Atlanta Film Festival, the Helsinki African Film Festival, the 27th Annual Emden International Film Festival, and the New York African Film Festival at the Lincoln Center for the Performing Arts where it was co-presented by the Human Rights Watch.

== Awards ==
Award	Category	Recipient	Result
International Film Festival of Kerala	Best Film		Nominated
Black Reel Awards	Outstanding World Cinema Motion Picture		Nominated
International Filmfest Emden-Norderney	SCORE Bernhard Wicki Award		Nominated
Screen Nation Film and Television Awards	Favourite UK African Film	Nicholas K. Lory, Maximilian Claussen, Nana Obiri Yeboah	Won
Screen Nation Film and Television Awards	Favourite Male Screen Personality	Oris Erhuero	Won
Atlanta Film Festival	Jury Award for Best Film		Nominated
Helsinki African Film Festival	Jury Award for Human Rights and Social Commentary		Won
Film Africa London	AUF Audience Award		Nominated
Canada International Film Festival	Award of Excellence for a Foreign Film	Nicholas K. Lory	Won
12th Africa Movie Academy Awards	Best Film	Nicholas K. Lory	Nominated
12th Africa Movie Academy Awards	Best Actor in a Leading Role	Oris Erhuero	Nominated
12th Africa Movie Academy Awards	Best Actor in a Supporting Role	Joseph Otsiman	Nominated
12th Africa Movie Academy Awards	Best Director	Nana Obiri Yeboah, Maximilian Claussen	Won
12th Africa Movie Academy Awards	Best Screenplay	Maximilian Claussen	Nominated
12th Africa Movie Academy Awards	Best Cinematography	Nicholas K. Lory	Won
12th Africa Movie Academy Awards	Best Costume Design	Afriye Frimpong	Nominated
12th Africa Movie Academy Awards	Best Make-up	Araba Ansah	Nominated
12th Africa Movie Academy Awards	Best Production Design	Davide De Stefano	Won
12th Africa Movie Academy Awards	Best Soundtrack	Benjamin Wright	Nominated
12th Africa Movie Academy Awards	Best Editing	Josh Levinsky	Nominated
12th Africa Movie Academy Awards	Best Sound	Gernot Fuhrmann	Nominated
12th Africa Movie Academy Awards	Best Young/Promising Actor	Ophelia Dzidzornu	Nominated
Golden Movie Awards	Overall Golden Movie	Nicholas K. Lory	Won
Golden Movie Awards	Golden Cinematography	Nicholas K. Lory	Nominated
Golden Movie Awards	Golden Actor	Oris Erhuero	Nominated
Golden Movie Awards	Golden Supporting Actor	Fred Amugi	Nominated
Golden Movie Awards	Golden Supporting Actress	Ama K. Abebrese	Won
Golden Movie Awards	Golden Director	Nana Obiri Yeboah	Won
Golden Movie Awards	Golden Writer	Maximilian Claussen	Nominated
Golden Movie Awards	Golden Art Director	Georgie Carson	Won
Golden Movie Awards	Golden Editor	Josh Levinsky	Nominated
Golden Movie Awards	Golden Sound Editor	Gernot Fuhrmann	Nominated
Golden Movie Awards	Golden Discovery	Ophelia Dzidzornu	Nominated
Ghana Movie Awards	Best Picture	Nicholas K. Lory	Nominated
Ghana Movie Awards	Best Actor in a Leading Role	Oris Erhuero	Nominated
Ghana Movie Awards	Best Actor in a Supporting Role	Jimmy Jean-Louis	Nominated
Ghana Movie Awards	Best Directing	Nana Obiri Yeboah	Nominated
Ghana Movie Awards	Best Cinematography	Nicholas K. Lory	Nominated
Ghana Movie Awards	Best Makeup and Hairstyling	Araba Ansah	Won
Ghana Movie Awards	Best Actress in a Supporting Role	Ama K. Abebrese	Nominated
Ghana Movie Awards	Best Adapted or Original Screenplay	Maximilian Claussen	Nominated
Ghana Movie Awards	Best Production Design	Davide De Stefano	Nominated
Ghana Movie Awards	Best Music (Original Score)	Benjamin Wright	Nominated
Ghana Movie Awards	Best Music (Original Song)	Benjamin Wright	Nominated
Ghana Movie Awards	Best Editing	Josh Levinsky	Nominated
Ghana Movie Awards	Best Visual Effects	Ahmed El-Azma	Nominated
Ghana Movie Awards	Best Sound Editing and Mixing	Gernot Fuhrmann	Nominated
Ghana Movie Awards	Discovery of the Year	Ophelia Dzidzornu	Nominated
