= Tell Me Sweet Something =

2015 romantic comedy film

- Genre: English Zulu Xhosa Sotho
- Created by: Duma Ndlovu
- Directed by: Akin Omotoso
- Starring: Nomzamo Mbatha; Maps Maponyane; Thembi Seete
- Country of origin: South Africa

Production
- Producer: Robbie Thorpe

Original release
- Release: September 4, 2015

Tell Me Sweet Something is a 2015 South African romantic comedy film starring Nomzamo Mbatha, Maps Maponyane and Thishiwe Ziqubu. The film was directed by Akin Omotoso and produced by Robbie Thorpe. The film received nine nominations at the 12th Africa Movie Academy Awards and won two awards, including the Achievement in Screenplay and Best Supporting Actress for Thishiwe Ziqubu.

== Plot ==
The movie goes through with the elderly couples reminiscing, telling their love stories during the course of the film.

Moratiwa Vokwana (Nomzamo Mbatha) is a writer who wrote African love stories and was a teen sensation. Although, things came crumbling down when she did not get the publishing deal and her boyfriend, Norman, broke up with her, and she gave up writing romantic stories and love. Moratiwa owns a bookstore in downtown Johannesburg and is helped by her assistant Lola (Thembi Seete). The bookstore is in danger of closing because of unpaid bills, unsold books and electrical problems. Her accountant, Robyn (Mandisa Bardill) urges Moratiwa to start selling more books if she wants to keep the place afloat. Her best friend Tashaka (Thishiwe Ziqubu) who is also a writer believes that Moratiwa has commitment issues in which she is in denial of that.

Tashaka convinces Moratiwa to go to a club, believing that she will find the one and will hopefully get over her ex. Moratiwa reluctantly agrees and they go to a club with Katlego (Kagiso Lediga), Tashaka's alcoholic boyfriend. She is spotted by Nat Masilo (Maps Maponyane) who is a famous model and tries to pursue her but she shows no interest in him. Gordon (Thomas Gumede), Nat's wingman and friend also does the same with Tashaka but she also shows no interest. As the night goes on, Nat and Moratiwa dance and he invites her to his place, Moratiwa asks Tashaka if she would come along with to which she agrees. Katlego is in no state of driving since he is drunk, and Gordon offers to drive since he is the only one who is sober. Moratiwa arrives at Nat's place and it becomes awkward when Sashi, Nat's ex-girlfriend, arrives, upsetting Moratiwa and causing her to leave. Gordon, Tashaka and Katlego are pulled over by the cops, then Katlego offends the cops and is arrested.

The following day, Moratiwa bumps into Nat along the way and concludes that he is not the right one for her because he is a "4'5 ft man" and he doesn't read books. Due to the decline of books sales, Lola suggests to Moratiwa that they should have a "happening" so to increase the books sales, which Moratiwa agrees to. Nat goes to Moratiwa's bookstore looking for a book to read and Lola notices him, thinking that he is here for the book event and invites him to be one of the models. That night, the book event takes place with a lot of people in attendance. Moratiwa is surprised to see Nat at the event, Nat lets Moratiwa know that the modelling career isn't who is he, it is what he does which is why he spray-painted the billboard of him with some help from Gordon. Later that night, Moratiwa is encouraged and that starts writing a novel.

Although the event was a success some books were sold, but not enough money was saved to pay debts and to fix electrical problems. Tashaka who finally gives Gordon a chance goes on a date with him but is still in a relationship with Katlego. Moratiwa and Nat get to know each other a bit better, with the pair going up to the rooftop and end up in a passionate kiss for the first time. Moratiwa and Nat go out for the night with Tashaka and Katlego. Moratiwa and Nat leave Tashaka and Katlego who passes out, and the pair goes to Nat's place finding Sashi waiting for Nat. She reveals that she is pregnant with Nat's child, leaving Moratiwa distraught and refuses any contact with Nat. Moratiwa isn't sure if she wants to continue seeing Nat seeing that she has fallen in love with him. While having coffee she bumps into Nat again who tells her that he is not the father and convinces her to go on a bicycle ride. Moratiwa reluctantly agrees and the pair go on a bicycle ride, touring the city. After their bicycle ride, the pair go their separate ways, only for Moratiwa to call out for Nat and the pair run into each other's arms and they make love that night.

The following day, Tashaka comes back and finds the apartment a mess and a half-naked Katlego drunkenly asleep. She wakes up him, breaks up with him and kicks him out with his two friends. Moratiwa is awakened by a phone call from Lola who tells her to check her phone. Moratiwa reads an article from Twitter that Nat abandoned Sashi because of her pregnancy. Upset, she decides to leave Nat but he tells her that she is "the one running not him" and that he cares about her very much. Nonetheless, Moratiwa leaves Nat, and takes the bus ride back home, heartbroken. The bookshop is burnt down to the ground due to unfixed electrical appliances which caused an electric spark igniting the fire. Moratiwa is left lamenting for the loss of the bookstore and Nat. Moratiwa bumps to her ex-boyfriend, Norman who is in another relationship and has a son. Moratiwa expresses on how Norman ended their relationship and Norman explains that the reason why he left was because he felt that Moratiwa wasn't fully committed to their relationship due to her writing career and was hiding her true feelings.

Now realizing that she has commitment issues, Moratiwa wants to work things out with Nat after finding out that Nat did not impregnate Sashi. Tashaka tells Moratiwa that Nat is leaving the country for good to go to Vietnam, and realizing her mistake, she rushes to the airport to try and stop him from leaving. She pleads with him not to leave because she has fallen in love with him. Unfortunately her pleas don't work and Nat leaves for Vietnam with Moratiwa watching the airplane fly over the rooftop where they first kissed. During this time, Moratiwa finishes her book and publishes it. The book is met with critical acclaim and is a bestseller. Tashaka and Gordon are now in a relationship. As Moratiwa is about to autograph a book, she hears "plans can be changed" and realises that it is Nat who has returned from Vietnam. Nat professes his love for Moratiwa and they kiss.

== Cast ==
- Nomzamo Mbatha as Moratiwa
- Maps Maponyane as Nat
- Thishiwe Ziqubu as Tashaka
- Thomas Gumede as Gordon
- Kagiso Lediga as Katlego
- Thembi Seete as Lola
- Makhaola Ndebele as Electrician
- Mandisa Bardill as Robyn

== Production ==
Film production began in May 2014, shooting in Maboneng, downtown Johannesburg. The movie was released on 4 September 2015, it was a box-office hit.
