= Kachi Offiah =

Nigerian television personality

- Born: Lagos
- Education: Baze University
- Occupation: Television presenter at Arise News

Kachi Offiah is a Nigerian media personality and television host. She works as a television host for Arise News. Kachi is the host of Trending with Kachi Offiah on Arise News. She is also the host of Arise 360.

== Early life and career ==
Kachi Offiah was born in Lagos, Nigeria. She studied at Baze University where she studied and obtained an LL.B in Law from the institution in 2017.

Offiah had her first broadcasting stint in Nigeria as a radio presenter for 99.9 Kiss FM, a radio station based in Abuja, Nigeria. In 2018, Offiah joined Arise News as a television presenter and producer. Offiah has covered international events such as the Academy Awards and Met Gala for Arise News and hosts the daily entertainment and lifestyle show including ARISE 360, which celebrates moments in entertainment, arts, and culture. Offiah is the co-founder of Kavita, a company dedicated to creating structures for creatives.
