= Nomzamo Mbatha =

South African actress and activist (born 1990)

- Born: Nomzamo Nxumalo Mbatha; 13 July 1990 (age 36); KwaMashu, KwaZulu Natal, South Africa
- Education: Bechet High School
- Alma mater: University of Cape Town
- Occupations: Actress; activist; television personality; businesswoman; accountant
- Years active: 2012–present
- Organizations: Nomzamo Light House Foundation; UNHCR Goodwill Ambassador
- Agent: CAA
- Notable work: Coming 2 America as Mirembe; Isibaya as Thandeka Ndlovu; Shaka iLembe as Nandi
- Television: Miss South Africa 2020; One Night With Mzansi; SAMA Awards 2019
- Father: Skuta Nxumalo
- Relatives: Zamani Mbatha (brother)
- Awards: Forbes Africa 30 under 30 (2018)

Nomzamo Nxumalo Mbatha (born 13 July 1990) is a South African actress, activist, television personality and businesswoman. She is best known for portraying Thandeka Zungu on Mzansi Magic telenovela Isibaya (2013–2020) and Mirembe on Paramount's Coming 2 America (2021) and Queen Nandi KaBhebhe OkaSenzangakhona KaJama on Shaka iLembe (2023–2025).

== Early life ==
Nomzamo Mbatha was born on 13 July 1990 in KwaMashu Township, approximately 21 kilometres (13 mi), by road, north-west of the city of Durban, in KwaZulu Natal Province and is of Zulu ethnicity.

She attended Rippon Primary School in Durban and Bechet High School, where she obtained her High School Diploma. In 2018, she graduated from the University of Cape Town with a Bachelor of Commerce degree specialising in accounting.

== Career ==
Mbatha auditioned for a television show in July 2012. She has also started acting on Isibaya in 2013 and also became the main character, this marked her acting debut and was praised by critics for playing Thandeka Zungu. The search, which was held at Cape Town, attracted over 600 contestants. She placed in the top 70 and later the top 10. She was one of the three top finalists. In 2015, she made her film debut in Tell Me Sweet Something with Maps Maponyane, which was released on 4 September that year, and also appeared in the television show Umlilo from 2015 to 2016. That same year, she began hosting a reality travel show called Holiday Swap, on South African Broadcasting Corporation.

In April 2021, it was announced that she was cast in Saban Films new movie Soul Assassins alongside Bruce Willis which was later filmed under a new name Die Like Lovers but was released as Assassin and became Bruce Willis's last movie. In 2022, Mbatha revealed she has been cast as Nandi on the Mzansi Magic biopic TV series Shaka Ilembe, which she also co-produced.

The previous year, Mbatha signed with talent management agency Creative Artists Agency.

=== Hollywood and activism ===
After establishing a career in the entertainment industry in South Africa, Mbatha began working on Hollywood film projects like Coming 2 America alongside Eddie Murphy, and Assassin alongside Bruce Willis. She is a Global Ambassador of UNCHR serving as Continental Ambassador, and also served as the host for Global Citizens Concert in 2024.

== Philanthropy ==
=== Nomzamo Light House Foundation ===
Mbatha is the founder of the Nomzamo Lighthouse Foundation, a non-profit organisation established in 2015 to address socio-economic challenges affecting marginalised communities. The foundation focuses on improving access to education, promoting youth empowerment, and supporting women’s economic participation. It was founded as part of Mbatha’s broader humanitarian efforts and has since partnered with various corporate and philanthropic organisations to expand its programmes and national reach.

Through the foundation, Mbatha has overseen initiatives such as bursary programmes for disadvantaged students, youth development summits that provide mentorship and skills training, and the EmpoweringHER programme, which supports women entrepreneurs through funding and business development opportunities. The foundation has also implemented community outreach projects, including the distribution of school uniforms and social relief packages to vulnerable households, contributing to improved access to education and economic opportunities in underserved communities.

In March 2026, the foundation, in partnership with Cotton On Foundation and The Bookery, launched the first library under the Beyond Words project at Masivuke Primary School, Philippi, Cape Town. An initiative aimed at combating illiteracy in local communities.

== Filmography ==
Key
†	Denotes films that have not yet been released

=== Film ===
Nomzamo Mbatha' film credits
Year	Title	Role	Notes
2013	The Jake's are Missing	Page	Film debut role
2014	Tell Me Something Sweet	Muratiwa	
2017	All About Love	Vivian	Romance
2017	A Hotel Called Memory	Tina	Drama
2021	Coming 2 America	Mirembe	Comedy / Music
2023	Assassin	Alexa	Action / Crime / Thriller

=== Television ===
Nomzamo Mbatha' television credits
Year	Title	Role	Notes
2013—2020	Isibaya	Thandeka / Thandeka Zungu	7 Seasons
2017	Umlilo	Khwezi Simelani	4 episodes
2017	Holiday Swap	Host / Herself	Television documentary
2023	Shaka iLembe	Nandi	12 episodes

== Other achievements ==
In 2018, Mbatha was recognized as one of the OkayAfrika 100 Women 2018 Honorees, by OkayAfrica Digital Media.

In 2018, she spent time touring Kenyan refugee camps, in her role as UNHCR Ambassador.

She received an Africa Movie Academy Award for Best Actress nomination for playing "Moratiwa" in Tell Me Sweet Something (2015).

In January 2019, she was appointed a UNHCR goodwill ambassador. In October 2019, she was inducted into the Golden Key International Honour Society as one of its honorary members.

In 2025 Mbatha was announced as the first South African ambassador of Creme of Nature.

Mbatha is a long time supporter of Orlando Pirates F.C. as she says she considers herself the team's number 1 fan since she could tell.

== Awards and nominations ==
=== Simon Sabela KZN Film and TV Awards ===
Year	Nominee / work	Award	Result	Ref.
2024	Shaka iLembe	Best actress	Nominated	

=== South Africa Film and Television Awards ===
Year	Nominee / work	Award	Result	Ref.
2024	Herself	Best Actress In A TV Drama	Nominated	

=== National Film and Television Awards ===
Year	Nominee / work	Award	Result	Ref.
2024	Herself	Celebrity Personality of the Year 2024	Nominated	

=== Septimus Awards ===
Year	Nominee / work	Award	Result	Ref.
2024	Herself	Best African Actress 2024	Won	

== Personal life ==
=== Family ===
Mbatha is the sister of fellow Shaka iLembe actor Zamani Mbatha, and the media personality Wendy Mbatha. In 2023 Mbatha revealed that she spent most of her time on projects, but makes enough time for her family.

=== Relationship ===
In 2014 Mbatha announced that she was in a relationship with Idols season 8 Winner Khaya Mthethwa before calling it quits in December that year due to Mthethwa allegedly cheating with Nomzamo's then best friend and Isibaya co-star Jessica Nkosi. This ended the duo friendship and ruined their working collaboration from many TV shows to MC Events. Although Nkosi denied allegations of having any affair with Mthethwa, the two have never spoken to each other ever since and do not support or follow each other on socials.

In 2015 during the filming of Nomzamo's first lead role in film (Tell Me Sweet Something ), Mbatha met co-star Maps Maponyane on set. In a month's time, the two started dating and quickly became South Africa's favourite celebrity couple. In 2015, the couple made headlines when cheating allegations surfaced claiming Maponyane cheated on Mbatha. The couple eventually broke up with Nomzamo ending up unfollowing Maponyane on all social media platforms.
