= June Givanni =

Guyanese-born London-based film curator

dr June Givanni
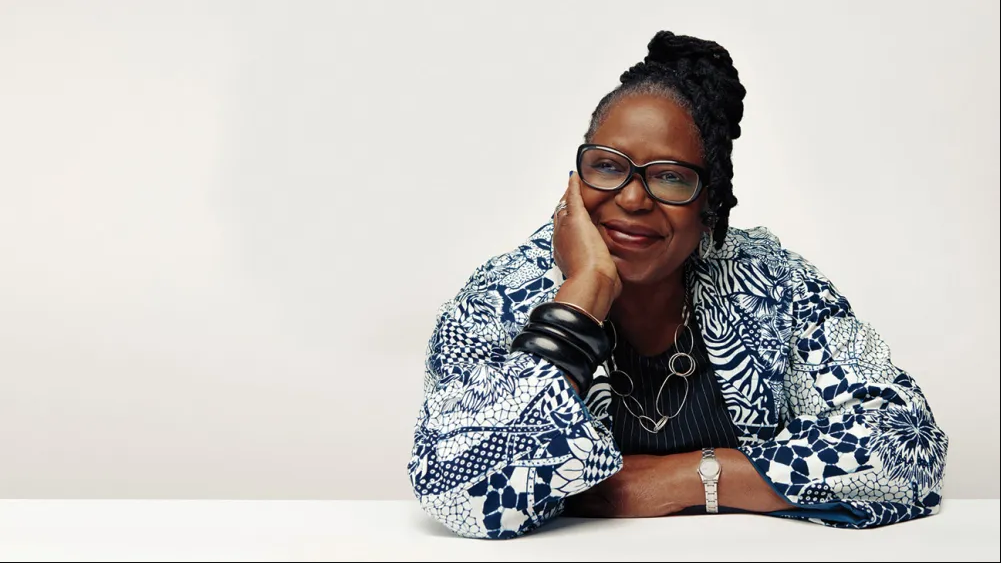
- Born: June Ingrid Givanni; Georgetown, Guyana
- Occupation: Film curator
- Known for: Founder of June Givanni Pan African Cinema Archive (JGPACA)
- Awards: BAFTA Outstanding British Contribution to Cinema Award (2024)
- Website: junegivannifilmarchive.org

June Givanni is a Guyanese-born London-based film curator. She has specialized in African-related movies since 1985, and has worked internationally as a film and television programme consultant and writer. She is also a member of the Africa Movie Academy Award jury.

Having worked as a film curator on five continents, she is now best known for founding the June Givanni Pan African Cinema Archive (JGPACA) in London, a personal collection documenting pan-African cinema over 40 years that has been described as "one of the world's most important collections documenting the moving image for the African continent and its diaspora". Givanni was selected as the 2024 recipient of the BAFTA Outstanding British Contribution to Cinema Award.

== Background ==
June Ingrid Givanni was born in Georgetown, Guyana, and grew up in the UK.

She was co-ordinator of the Greater London Council's Third Eye Film Festival in 1983, and during the 1980s was active in working for the creation of specialist distribution circuits for the work of black and Third World filmmakers. At the British Film Institute (BFI) she created and was responsible for managing the African Caribbean Unit, and she compiled the first comprehensive directory of black and Asian films in the UK, as well as starting with Gaylene Gould the BFI's 'Black Film Bulletin'Gianmaria Givanni Architect, BFB Designer and contributor 1993–96.

Givanni has worked with various international film festivals programming African and African diaspora films as a guest curator, including at the São Paulo Short Film Festival in Brazil, the Kerala International Film Festival in India, Images Caraibes in Martinique, Creteil Film Festival, in Paris. Givanni has served on film juries at African film festivals such as FESPACO (from 1985), Zanzibar Festival of the Dhow Countries, the All Africa Film Awards in South Africa, the JCCarthage and others.

Her publications include the edited volumes Remote Control: Dilemmas of Black Intervention in British Film and TV (1996) and Symbolic Narratives/African Cinema: Audiences, Theory and the Moving Image (2001).

== The June Givanni Pan African Cinema Archive (JGPACA) ==
She runs the June Givanni Pan African Cinema Archive (JGPACA) in London, a personal collection of films, ephemera, manuscripts, publications, audio, photography, posters documenting pan-African cinema, which is held at MayDay Rooms, London (since 2017) and is frequently open to researchers and the general public. As Maya Jaggi writes in The Financial Times: "PerAnkh, an 'Egyptian term for a place of learning and memory', is how June Givanni sees her personal archive, now one of the world’s most important collections documenting the moving image for the African continent and its diaspora. Based in central London's MayDay Rooms, dedicated to 'history from below', the June Givanni Pan African Cinema Archive ranges from rare videos and audio interviews to film and festival posters, screenplays and transcripts, snapshots and stills. It forms an alternative history of the past six decades of film-making with Africa at its heart." As Nadia Khomami notes: "The volunteer-run archive is one of the world's most important collections documenting the moving image for the African continent and its diaspora, and includes artefacts that might otherwise not have been preserved."

In 2023, Raven Row hosted the exhibition PerAnkh: The June Givanni PanAfrican Cinema Archive, on display from 15 April to 4 June. As the reviewer for Time Out said, "You’d have to move in for a month to even scratch the surface of what’s on display." Leila Latif stated in The Guardian: "The exhibition forms an alternative history, acknowledging the vitality and ingenuity that are under-appreciated or studiously ignored by so many. And the value of physical films and objects is beyond just what they depict. ...While Givanni has always been at the forefront of the decolonisation of culture, engaging with the archive invites you to join her there."

== Awards ==
In 2018, Givanni was awarded an honorary doctorate by SOAS, University of London.

Givanni is the 2024 recipient of the BAFTA Outstanding British Contribution to Cinema Award, "presented to an individual or organisation that has made a significant and inspiring contribution to film through a particular project or work - with focus on recognising work that might not otherwise be eligible in BAFTA's competitive awards' categories."

== Selected published works ==
- Black/Asian film & video list (BFI Education 1988)
- Remote Control: Dilemmas of Black Intervention in British Film and TV (BFI Publishing, 1996; ISBN 978-0851705378
- Symbolic Narratives/African Cinema: Audiences, Theory and the Moving Image (BFI, 2001; ISBN 978-0851708553
