= Oris Erhuero =

British actor

- Erhuero in 2018
- Born: 23 September 1968 (age 57); London, England, United Kingdom
- Occupations: Actor, producer, writer, fashion model
- Years active: 1993–present

Oris Erhuero (born 23 September 1968) is a British actor, producer, writer, and fashion model. After modelling for several years, he transitioned into television and film, with roles in The Adventures of Sinbad, The Bill, Highlander: Endgame, Sometimes in April, and Redcon-1.

== Early life ==
Oris Erhuero was born in Finsbury Park, London, and is the oldest of seven children. Attended Beaufoy Boys School Kennington and later classically trained in the Fashion Drama and Arts. He came to Hollywood in the early 90s off the back of modelling in London, New York, Paris and Milan.

== Career ==
Erhuero obtained a series regular role of Rongar in the television series The Adventures of Sinbad. He played the role of Winston in Highlander: Endgame. Erhuero has also worked on several television shows in both England and United States, such as E-Ring and The District. In 2005, he appeared in the HBO film Sometimes in April which was based on the Rwandan genocide, and he was nominated for the Black Reel Award for Outstanding Supporting Actor in a Television Movie or Limited Series.

In 2008, Erhuero left Los Angeles and returned to London for additional acting roles. He made his British television debut on the crime drama series The Bill and on stage in the play The Diary of Black Men. In 2016, Erhuero won the Screen Nation Award for Favourite Male Screen Personality for The Cursed Ones. In the same year, he was also nominated for the Ghana Movie Award for Best leading actor for Road to Yesterday.

== Filmography ==
| Year | Movie | Role | Notes |
|---|---|---|---|
| 1996 | The Adventures of Sinbad | Rongar | Leading role |
| 2000 | Highlander: Endgame | Winston | |
| 2000 | Titus | DEA Agent | Episode: "The Surprise Party" |
| 2002 | V.I.P. | Saghal | Episode: "True Val Story" |
| 2002 | The District | Tyrell Wilson | Episode: "Payback" |
| 2002 | Crossing Jordan | Fireman | Episode: "Fire and Ice" |
| 2002 | Black Mask 2 | "Wolf" | |
| 2003 | Lotta | King | |
| 2002 | The Orlando Jones Show | "Baby Daddy" | |
| 2003 | One on One | Mr. James | Episode: "I Hear White People" |
| 2004 | A Lousy Ten Grand | Cleon | |
| 2005 | Sometimes in April | Honoré | Nominated - Black Reel Award for Outstanding Supporting Actor in a Television Movie or Limited Series |
| 2005 | Joe Willie's Friend | Michael | |
| 2005 | The Gold Bracelet | The Man | |
| 2005 | E-Ring | Guest Star | |
| 2006 | Hurricane in the Rose Garden | Warrior | |
| 2009 | The Bill | Linton Barry | Episode: "Prodigal Son" |
| 2009 | Moloch Tropical | John Baker | |
| 2010 | Chicago Pulaski Jones | "Tornado" | |
| 2013 | Strike Back: Shadow Warfare | Brigadier General Lewis / Colonel Lewis | Episode: "Part 10" |
| 2015 | The Cursed Ones | Godwin Ezeudu | Won - Screen Nation Award for Favorite Male Screen Personality; Nominated - Africa Movie Academy Award for Best Actor in a Leading Role; Also Executive Producer |
| 2015 | Road to Yesterday | Izu | Nominated - Ghana Movie Award for Best leading actor |
| 2018 | Redcon-1 | Captain Marcus Stanton | Won - Best Actor, HBO UASE Festival |
| 2022 | The Invitation | Isaac | |
| 2023 | Orah | Agent Isaa Garuba | |
