= Marks Maponyane =

South African soccer player

Personal information
- Full name: Marks Maponyane
- Date of birth: 16 February 1962 (age 64)
- Place of birth: Meadowlands, Zone 1, South Africa
- Position: Striker

Youth career
- Shamrocks

Senior career*
| Years | Team | Apps | (Gls) |
| 1981–1991 | Kaizer Chiefs | 192 | (85) |
| 1987 | Vitoria Setubal | 7 | (9) |
| 1991–1992 | Dynamos | 31 | (13) |
| 1992–1996 | Orlando Pirates | 136 | (40) |
| 1996–1998 | Wits University | 74 | (30) |
| Total | | 433 | (168) |

International career
| 1992–1995 | South Africa | 13 | (2) |
- * Club domestic league appearances and goals

Marks Maponyane (born 16 February 1962) is a retired South African football player.

== Kaizer Chiefs ==
Maponyane joined Chiefs when he was 19 and started off by earning R600 a month. He scored on debut on 12 April 1981 against Leceister City in Eldorardo. He is the only player to win Footballer of the Year three times, he won the award in 1984 and 1987 with Chiefs. He captained the club from 1985 to 1988. He is Kaizer Chiefs all-time top goalscorer with 85 goals. He had a 7-month spell with Vitoria Setubal. His teammates couldn't speak English but only his coach Stuart Baxter could. When the season ended and everyone was leaving, he left for South Africa and never came back. He also went on a 3-month trial to Grasshopper Zurich with Fani Madida during his spell. Maponyane left Chiefs for Dynamos in 1991.

In 1993, he joined Orlando Pirates from which he won 1994 league title and African Champions league in 1995.

He also had a full-time job at Premier Milling. He started working for Adidas in 1984 and later had sponsorship deals and endorsements with them.

== Personal life ==
He has been married since 1985 and has two sons, Katlego, and Masego. Masego, was voted Cosmopolitan Magazine's Sexiest Man of the Year Katlego is a snowboarder, and was one of the seven year old children selected in 1992 as part of the South African version of the Up Series.

== International career ==
Maponyane made his debut for Bafana Bafana on 16 August 1992 in a 4-1 loss to Zimbabwe in an AFCON qualifier coming in the 52nd minute for Shane McGregor. He scored his first goal in his third international match in the 6th minute against Zimbabwe in an AFCON qualifier on 26 April 1993 but Benjamin Nkonjera equalised in the 82nd minute to make it 1-1. He scored his second and last goal for South Africa on 26 November 1994 in a 2-1 win over Ghana in the 11th minute. He played his last international on 26 April 1995 in a 3-1 win over Lesotho.

== After Retirement ==
Maponyane hails from Meadowlands in Soweto. He is currently an analyst at SABC and was South Africa's analyst during the FIFA World Cup in 2006. He is also the Sales Executive at Adidas South Africa.

He has been a motivational speaker since his spell at Chiefs since 1989. He has done motivational talks at Toyota and Nissan SA.

== Nickname ==
He is also known by his nickname "Go Man Go"

=== International goals ===
| # | Date | Venue | Opponent | Score | Result | Competition |
|---|---|---|---|---|---|---|
| 1 | 24 April 1993 | FNB Stadium, South Africa | Zimbabwe | 1-0 | 1-1 | AFCON qualifier |
| 2 | 26 November 1994 | Loftus Versfeld, South Africa | Ghana | 1-0 | 2-1 | Simba Cup |
