= Nana Obiri Yeboah =

Ghanaian film director (born 1979)

Nana Obiri-Yeboah
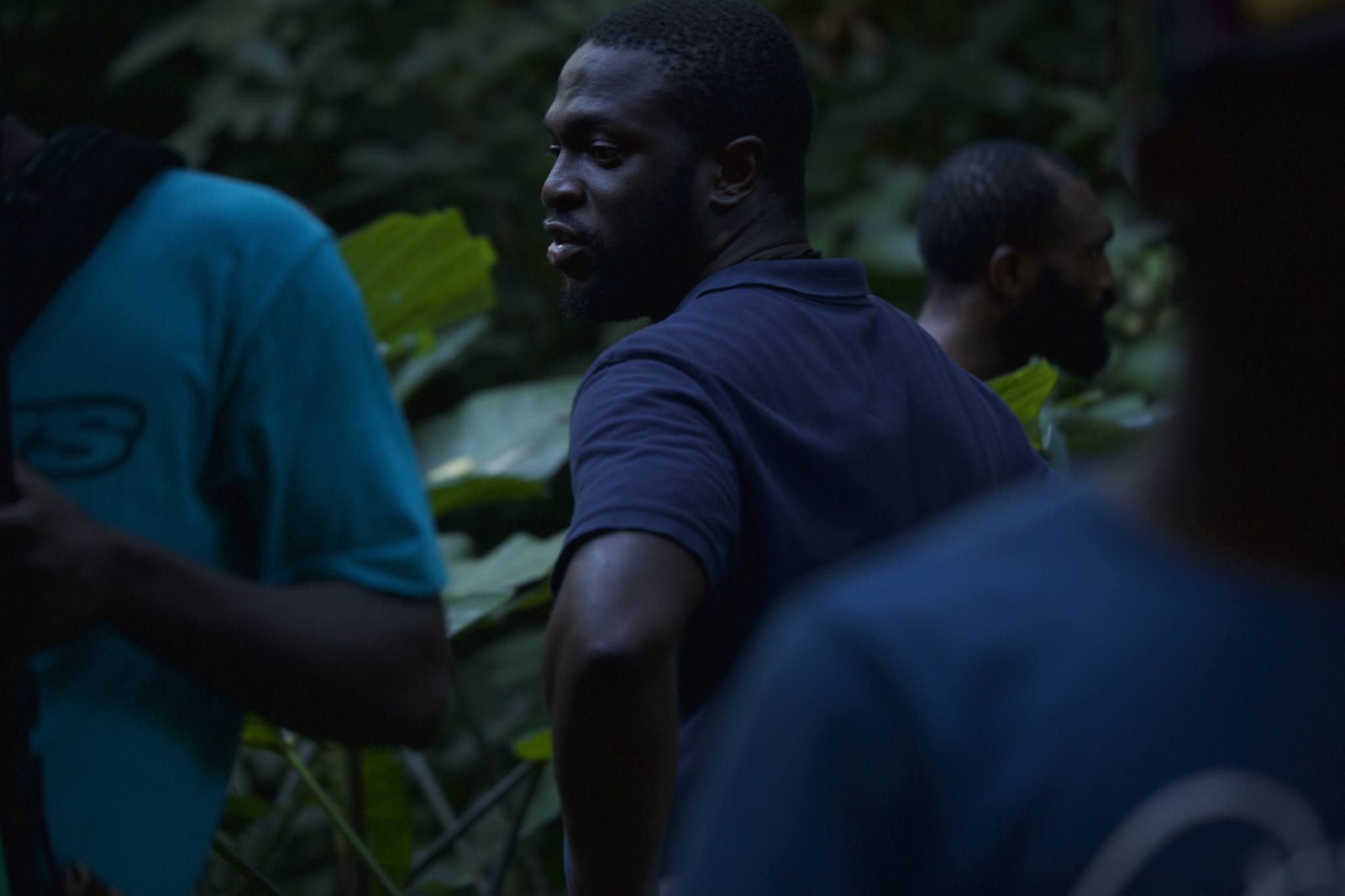
- Born: March 28, 1979 (age 46); Accra, Ghana
- Occupation: Film Director
- Years active: 2009–present
- Known for: The Cursed Ones

Nana Obiri - Yeboah (born March 28, 1983) is a Ghanaian film director. He is known for the 2015 film The Cursed Ones, which received 13 nominations at the Africa Movie Academy Awards, including Best Film and Best Director.

== Early life ==
Nana Obiri-Yeboah was born on March 28, 1979, in Accra, Ghana. He wrote and Directed his first Play at the age of 14 years at his local church.

== Awards and nominations ==
Year	Award	Category	Nominated work	Result
2015	Africa Movie Academy Awards	Best Director	The Cursed Ones	Won
2015	Africa Movie Academy Awards	Best Film	The Cursed Ones	Nominated

Year	Award	Category	Nominated work	Result
2016	Screen Nation Film and Television Awards	Favourite African UK Movie (made by or featuring significantly British based talent)	The Cursed Ones	Won
2016	Screen Nation Film and Television Awards	Favourite African UK Movie (made by or featuring significantly British based talent)	Nana Means King	Nominated

Year	Award	Category	Nominated work	Result
2016	Canada International Film Festival	2016 Award of Excellence Winner)	The Cursed Ones	Won

Year	Award	Category	Nominated work	Result
2016	Helsinki African Film Festival	2016 Jury award for Human Rights and Social Commentary	The Cursed Ones	Won
