= Kgopedi Lilokoe =

South African radio personality

Kgopedi Oa Namane Lilokoe is a South African radio personality from Tembisa. She is the former Midday News and Africa Watch anchor on South Africa’s largest commercial radio station, Metro FM. She also hosted Africa Digest, a daily current affairs programme that runs from 5pm to 8pm, on Channel Africa Radio. In June 2016, she was announced as a host of the 12th Africa Movie Academy Awards.
