= Screen Nation Film and Television Awards =

British award ceremony

Screen Nation Film & TV Awards
- Awarded for: Rewarding Excellence – Celebrating Diversity
- Country: United Kingdom
- First award: 2003
- Website: https://www.screennation.org

The Screen Nation Film & TV Awards, formerly the bfm (black filmmaker) Film and TV Awards, was founded in September 2003 by independent film producer Charles Thompson, as a platform to raise the profile of black British and international film and television talent of African heritage.

== Statuette ==
The Screen Nation Award statuette is based on a West African mask and was designed by Jamaican-born sculptor George "Fowokan" Kelly. "The statuette signifies via the mask that there is a change coming. A mask takes you from one state into another and in this case from being unrecognized and unrewarded to being recognized and celebrated".

== Awards ==
The Screen Nation Film and TV Awards are given at a televised event that normally takes place in October during UK Black History Month. The awards ceremony—dubbed the "Black BAFTAs" by The Independent newspaper in 2003—brings together actors, actresses, directors and filmmakers from the British and international film and TV industry.

In 2016, Earl Cameron became the first inductee into the Screen Nation "Hall of Frame" at the BFI Southbank, where he was interviewed by Samira Ahmed.

== Voting ==
The Screen Nation Film and TV Awards are based on voting by the general public as well as the Screen Nation committee. The honorary and major awards, such as the Outstanding Contribution to Film and TV Award and the Edric Connor Inspiration Award, are decided by the Screen Nation Executive committee. The People's Choice categories—Favourite Male TV Star, Favourite Female TV Star, Favourite Music Performance on Film/TV, Favourite Presenter, Favourite Reality Star, International Film, US Male Screen Personality Film/TV, US Female Screen Personality Film/TV, West African Film Actor, West African Film Actress and West African Film—are all voted for by the public.

The 2007 awards ceremony saw actor Morgan Freeman honoured with the Outstanding Contribution Award, newsreader Moira Stuart honoured with the Edric Connor Inspiration Award and American TV director-producer Stan Lathan with the new Vanguard Award. A final honorary award - the Classic TV Award - was presented to the television series Roots in what was its 30th anniversary year.

The 2016 awards ceremony saw actor Wesley Snipes honoured with the Outstanding Contribution Award.

In 2017, the 12th Screen Nation awards took place. The Edric Connor Trailblazer award was given to Horace Ové.

== 2018 winners ==
Award	Winner
Outstanding Contribution to Film and TV Award (Int)	
Edric Connor Inspiration Award (UK)	
Special Award	
Rising Star	
Achievement in Film Production	
Female Performance in Film	
Male Performance in Film	
Favourite International Movie	
Favourite African UK Movie	
Favourite Film	
Favourite Male Screen Personality	
Favourite Female Screen Personality	
Independent Spirit Film Production	
Male Performance in TV	
Female Performance in TV	
Favourite Male TV Personality	
Favourite Female TV Personality	
Emerging Talent	
Diversity in Drama Production	
Diversity in Factual Production	
Favourite Grime Music Promo	
Favourite Comedy Production	Just a Couple by Sebastian Thiel
Favourite Black Broadcaster	
Favourite Reality TV Talent	

== 2016 winners ==
Award	Winner
Outstanding Contribution to Film and TV Award (Int)	Wesley Snipes
Edric Connor Inspiration Award (UK)	Carmen Munroe
Rising Star	Malachi Kirby (Jekyll & Hyde, Dough)
Achievement in Film Production	The Hard Stop
Female Performance in Film	Nathalie Emmanuel (Fast & Furious 7)
Male Performance in Film	John Boyega (Star Wars: Episode VII)
Favourite International Movie	Beasts of No Nation – Idris Elba, Ama K. Abebrese, Jude Akuwudlike
Favourite African UK Movie	The Cursed Ones – Nicholas K. Lory, Nana Obiri Yeboah, Maximilian Claussen
Favourite Film	Beasts of No Nation
Favourite Male Screen Personality	Oris Erhuero
Favourite Female Screen Personality	Gayle Ngozi Thompson-Igwebike
Independent Spirit Film Production	Looking for Love
Male Performance in TV	Kascion Franklin (Danny and the Human Zoo)
Female Performance in TV	Cecilia Noble (Danny and the Human Zoo)
Favourite Male TV Personality	Charles Venn (Casualty)
Favourite Female TV Personality	Alison Hammond (Strictly Come Dancing)
Emerging Talent	Anthony Welsh
Diversity in Drama Production	The Interceptor (BBC)
Diversity in Factual Production	Britain's Forgotten Slave Owners (BBC)
Favourite Grime Music Promo	Lady Leshurr
Favourite Comedy Production	Chewing Gum (E4)

== 2007 winners ==
Award	Winner
Outstanding Contribution to Film and TV Award (Int)	Morgan Freeman
Edric Connor Inspiration Award (UK)	Moira Stuart
Vanguard in Production (Int)	Stan Lathan
Classic TV Series	Roots
Achievement in African Film Production (Int)	Bamako
Male Performance in Film	David Harewood (Blood Diamond)
Female Performance in Film	Naomie Harris (Pirates of the Caribbean)
Male Performance in TV	Aml Ameen (The Bill)
Female Performance in TV	Sharon D Clarke (Holby City)
Favourite TV Presenter	Ainsley Harriott (Ready Steady Cook)
Favourite Male TV Star	Adrian Lester (Hustle)
Favourite Female TV Star	Freema Agyeman (Doctor Who)
Emerging Talent	Patrick Regis
Diversity in Drama Production	The Bill
Diversity in Factual Production	Roots Remembered
Independent Spirit Film Production	Mark Norfolk (Crossing Bridges)
Favourite Music Performance on Film/TV	Dizzee Rascal (Fix Up, Look Sharp)
Fav Male US Screen Personality	Jamie Foxx (Dreamgirls)
Fav Female US Screen Personality	Jennifer Hudson (Dreamgirls)
Fav International Film	The Last King of Scotland
Fav West African Male Screen Personality	Van Vicker
Fav West African Female Screen Personality	Stephanie Okereke
Fav West African Film	The Amazing Grace

== 2006 winners ==
Award	Winner
Outstanding Contribution to Film and TV Award (Int)	Yaphet Kotto
Edric Connor Inspiration Award (UK)	Mona Hammond
Achievement in Stunt Work, Choreography & Action Direction	Clive Curtis
Achievement in Independent Film Production	Pikki (Rollin' with the Nines)
Male Performance in Film	Adewale Akinnuoye-Agbaje (Get Rich or Die Tryin', The Mistress of Spices)
Female Performance in Film	Thandie Newton (Crash)
Male Performance in TV	Adewale Akinnuoye-Agbaje (Lost)
Female Performance in TV	Suzanne Packer (Casualty)
Favourite Sports Presenter	John Barnes (John Barnes' Football Night)
Favourite Male TV Star	Wil Johnson (Waking the Dead)
Favourite Female TV Star	Phina Oruche (Footballers' Wives)
Emerging Talent	Kara Miller
Diversity in Drama Production	Doctors
Diversity in Factual Production	Sticks and Stones
Achievement in Screen-Writing for Film/TV	Noel Clarke (Kidulthood)
Favourite Music Performance on Film/TV	Keisha White (Weakness in Me)
Favorite BME Channel	Original Black Entertainment TV
Fav Male US Screen Personality	Terrence Howard (Crash, Hustle & Flow, Get Rich or Die Tryin')
Fav Female US Screen Personality	Loretta Devine (Crash)
Fav International Film	Crash
West African Film Personality	Aki & Paw Paw

== 2003 winners ==
Award	Winner
Outstanding Contribution to Film & TV Award (Int)	Spike Lee
Edric Connor Trailblazer Award (UK)	Rudolph Walker
Male Performance in Film	Chiwetel Ejiofor (Dirty Pretty Things)
Female Performance in Film	Sophie Okonedo (Dirty Pretty Things)
Male Performance in TV	Lennie James (Buried)
Female Performance in TV	Naomie Harris (White Teeth)
Favourite Female TV Star	Angela Griffin (Cutting It)
Favourite Male TV Star	Kwame Kwei-Armah (Casualty, Fame Academy)
Best Presenter	June Sarpong (T4)
Emerging Talent	Caroline Chikezie (As If)
Diversity in Drama Production	White Teeth
Diversity in Comedy Production	3 Non-Blondes

== 2002 winners (as bfm Awards) ==
Award	Winner
Outstanding Contribution to Film & TV Award (Int)	Pam Grier
Edric Connor Inspiration Award (UK)	Lenny Henry
Female Performance in Film	Marsha Thomason (Long Time Dead, Black Knight)
Male Performance in Film	Lennie James (24 Hour Party People)
Female Performance in TV	Diane Parish (Babyfather, The Bill)
Male Performance in TV	Eamonn Walker (Othello)
Emerging Talent	Zak Ove
Best Presenter	Angellica Bell
Fav Male US Screen Personality	Denzel Washington
Fav Female US Screen Personality	Angela Bassett
Fav US Film	Training Day
Fav Film Soundtrack	Ali
