= Walter Maponyane =

South African soccer player

Personal information
- Full name: Walter Maponyane
- Date of birth: 27 November 1987 (age 38)
- Place of birth: Malamulele, South Africa
- Position: Right-back

Team information
- Current team: Polokwane City

Senior career*
Years	Team	Apps	(Gls)
–2009	Als Puk Tawana		
2009–2010	Bidvest Wits		
2010–2011	M Tigers		
2011–2014	Mamelodi Sundowns	6	(0)
2012–2013	→ United FC (loan)	27	(6)
2013–2014	→ Chippa United (loan)	18	(0)
2014–2016	Royal Eagles	30	(11)
2016	Chippa United	8	(0)
2016–2020	Polokwane City	27	(0)

International career
	South Africa U20	7	(1)
- * Club domestic league appearances and goals as of 3 August 2016

Walter Maponyane (born 27 November 1987 in Malamulele) is a South African football (soccer) player for Premier Soccer League clubs.

Maponyane was previously known as Choppa Mboweni. He played under the identity of Choppa Mboweni for the South Africa Under-20 national 2009 and 2010, it was later found that he was over-age. He was previously considered to have been 20 years of age in 2011 under the guise of Mboweni.

He spent the 2012–13 season on loan at National First Division side United FC.
