= Beasts of No Nation =

2005 novel by Uzodinma Iweala

- First edition
- Author: Uzodinma Iweala
- Genre: War drama
- Publisher: Harper Perennial
- Publication date: 2005
- Publication place: United States

Beasts of No Nation is a 2005 novel by the Nigerian-American author Uzodinma Iweala, that takes its title from Fela Kuti's 1989 album of the same name. The book won the 2005 Art Seidenbaum Award for First Fiction and the Barnes & Noble Discover Great New Writers Award. It was adapted as a movie in 2015.

The novel follows the journey of a young boy, Agu, who is forced to join a group of soldiers in an unnamed West African country. While Agu fears his commander and many of the men around him, his fledgling childhood has been brutally shattered by the war raging through his country, and he is at first conflicted by simultaneous revulsion and fascination with the mechanics of war. Iweala does not shy away from explicit, visceral detail and paints a complex, difficult picture of Agu as a child soldier. The book does not give any direct clue as to which country it takes place in, and it remains undisclosed. The book is notable for its confrontational, immersive first-person narrative.

The theme of child soldiers draws on the author's Harvard thesis. The writer never experienced the events he writes about in his novel unlike other books in the same genre.

== Plot summary ==
The novel is about a West African boy named Agu who is forced to become a child soldier. When war came to his family's small village, Agu’s mother and sister are able to leave with the UN peacekeepers, but Agu is ordered to stay behind and fight with his father and the other men of the village. When soldiers attack the village the men realize that whether they hide or not they will eventually be killed. They mount an attack but Agu runs away at his father's wishes. His father is shot to death.

Agu hides and is soon found by soldiers, who coerce him to join their rebel force. In a bloody initiation, the commander forces him to kill an unarmed man.

As Agu is forced to leave his childhood behind, he reminisces about the past: his family, his love of reading and school, his dream of becoming an important doctor, and how he used to read the Bible every day. He thinks about how he and his friend used to play at war and how this war is not the same. He fears that God hates him for killing others, but he soon forces himself to believe that this is what God wants, because “he is soldier and this is what soldiers do in war.” He befriends a mute boy named Strika, and together they face the crimes and hardships of war: looting, rape, killing, and starvation.

Agu loses track of time, understanding only that he was a child before that war but has become a man in a seemingly never-ending trial by fire. He wants to stop killing but fears that so doing will get him killed by the Commandant. During this time of war Agu and the army have very little to eat, so they eat what they can: rats, small game, goats, and sometimes other people. The food is not cooked enough for fear that others will see the fire, and the water is known to contain human feces. Agu and other children in the battalion are raped by the Commandant in return for small tokens. While Agu hates the rape, he does not resist as he fears he will be killed by the Commandant if he does so.

The Commandant eventually takes the battalion to the village of his birth where they visit a brothel. Commandant's second in command, Luftenant, is stabbed by a prostitute. Luftenant is then replaced by a soldier named Rambo, thus named because of his bloodthirst.

His wish to escape the army finally comes true when Rambo leads a successful revolt against the Commandant in a period of agonising lack of basic necessities and leave the Commandment alone at the camp. Starved, exhausted and bereaved of his only friend, Strika, Agu joins the disbanded soldiers to try to make their way home. Strika dies, and Agu ultimately leaves his fellow soldiers.

In time, he comes under the care of a missionary shelter/hospital run by a preacher and a woman called Amy. Agu gets new clothes and all the food and sleep he wants and regains his health and strength. However, after having lived through a bloody guerrilla war, the Bible no longer holds any meaning for him. Amy invites him to share his thoughts and feelings, and Agu tells her he would like to be a doctor and save lives so as to redeem his sins. He admits to being a devil, but says that his mother is loving him.

== Film adaptation ==
A feature film was adapted by Cary Fukunaga, starring Abraham Attah as Agu and Idris Elba as the commander. The film is an international production, shot on location in the jungles of Ghana. It premiered on Netflix on October 16, 2015.
