= Dorothee Wenner =

German film curator and journalist

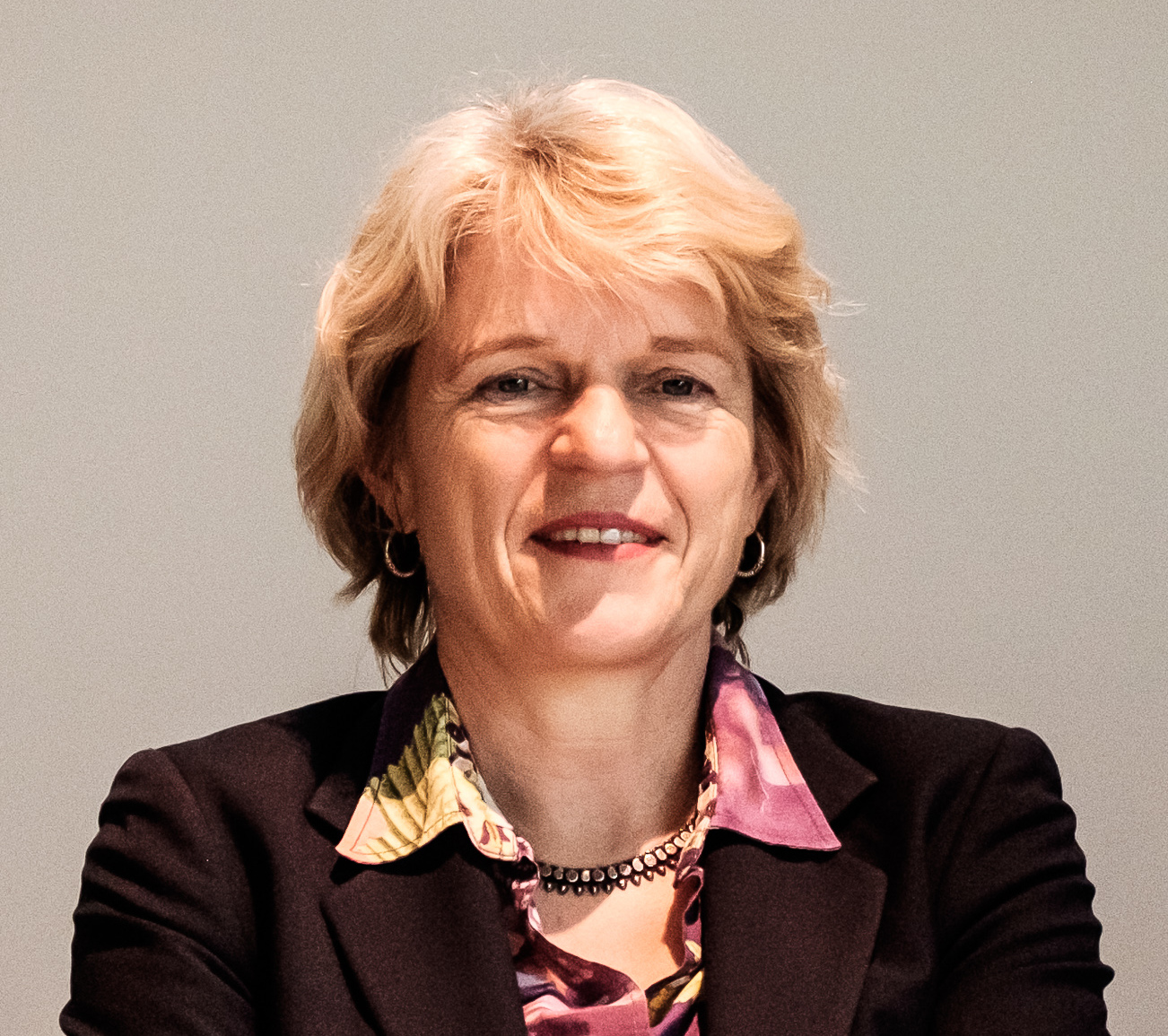
Dorothee Wenner, 2016

Dorothee Wenner is a German film curator and journalist. She has served as curator at the Berlin International Film Festival since 1990. She is also a founding jury member of the Africa Movie Academy Awards.
