= Eye of the Storm (2015 film) =

Psychological drama film

- French: L'œil du cyclone
- Directed by: Sékou Traoré
- Written by: Christophe Lemoine; Luis Marques
- Produced by: Axel Guyot
- Starring: Fargrass Assandre; Maimouna N'Diaye
- Cinematography: Pascal Baillargeau
- Release dates: 29 August 2015 (Festival du Film Francophone d'Angoulême); 22 November 2017
- Running time: 101 minutes
- Countries: France; Burkina Faso
- Languages: French; English

Eye of the Storm (French: L'oeil du cyclone) is a 2015 Burkinabé psychological drama film about child soldiers. The film was directed by Sékou Traoré, produced by Axel Guyot, written by Christophe Lemoine and Luis Marques, and starred Fargrass Assandre and Maἴmouna N'diaye. It received ten nominations at the 12th Africa Movie Academy Awards and won in three categories including Best Film.

== Synopsis ==
Based on the study of child soldiers, Sékou Traoré's film brings us to Emma Tou, a young lawyer who reluctantly accepts to defend a captured fugitive who may have been a child soldier, in what her boss titles "The Trial of the Century". Persistent to ensure a good and fair trial for the fugitive, Tou visits former child soldier Blackshouam Vila and tries to win his trust so he will help her in her case. But as Vila begins to tell her his history, Tou discovers the terrors of a child forced to fight in the military.

As Vila tells Tou how he is wavering between celebrating his awful crimes and lamenting about his nightmares, which frequently include his past victims.

The more Tou digs into the subject of child soldiers, the more she finds that points to government officials' involvement in causing Vila's turbulent childhood. Readying court, Tou is sealed into a search for truth where heroes and villains are no more than shades of gray.

== Cast ==
- Maïmouna N'Diaye - Emma Tou
- Fargass Assandé - Blackshouam Vila
- Abidine Dioari - Solo
- Issaka Sawouadogo - Roc
- Jacob Sou - President of the Bar
- Serge Henry - Father Tu
- Fatou Traoré - Emma's Sister
