= Keith Shiri =

Zimbabwean film curator (born 1967)

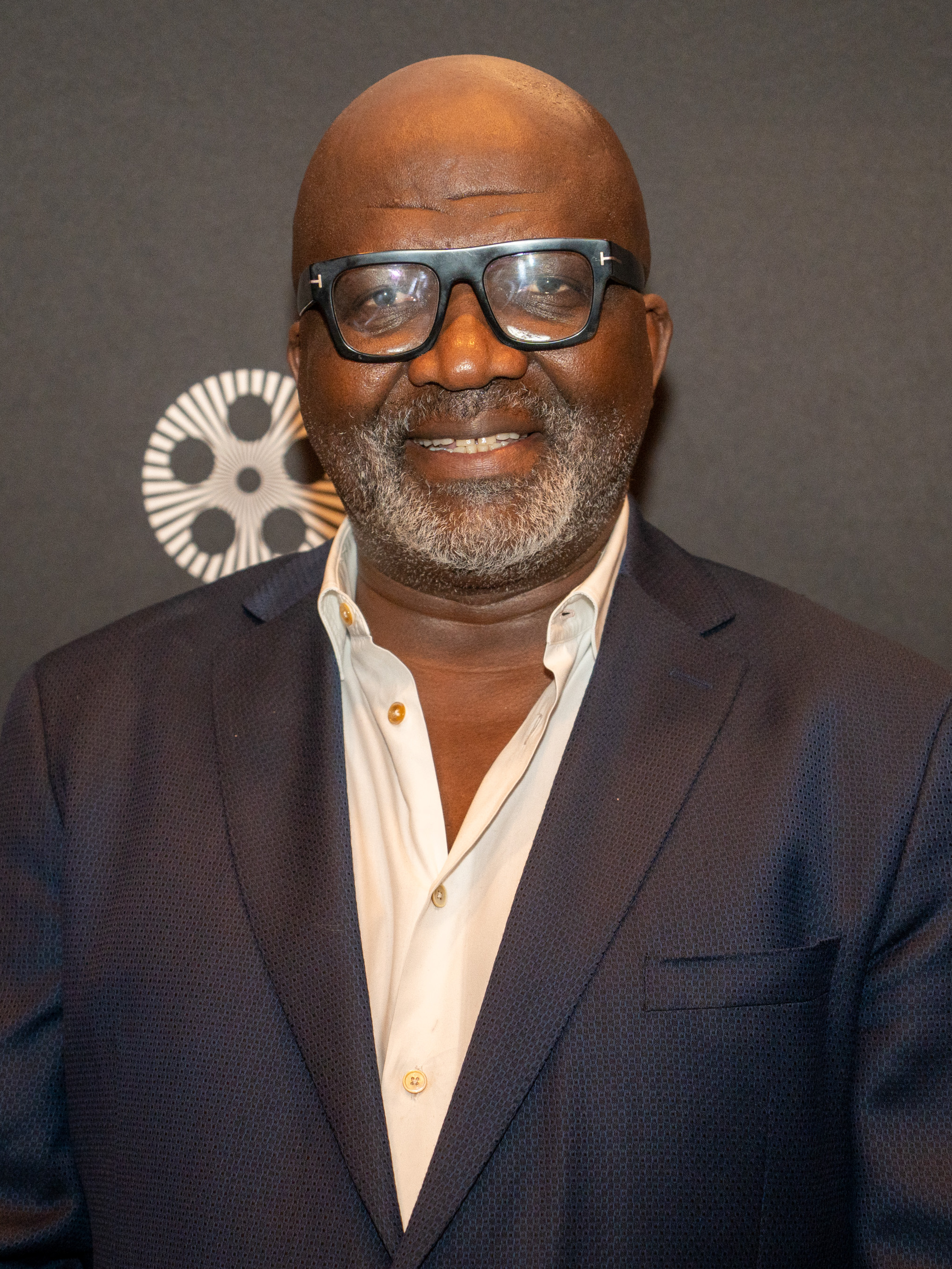
Keith Shiri at the 2025 New York African Film Festival

Keith Shiri is a Zimbabwean film curator, who has been based in Beirut, Lebanon, and in London, UK. In 2024 he was appointed the lead curator of Film Africa, a London-based festival of African and African diasporic film.

Shiri also has been an advisor to several film festivals, including London Film Festival, Venice Film Festival, Berlin International Film Festival, Dubai International Film Festival, Panafrican Film and Television Festival of Ouagadougou and Tampere Film Festival.

Shiri is considered a champion of African filmmaking around the world, including in Europe, Africa, and the Caribbean.

He is also a founding juror at the Africa Movie Academy Awards.
