= National Mirror =

Nigerian daily newspaper

- Type: Daily newspaper
- Publisher: Global Media Mirror Limited
- Website: https://www.nationalmirroronline.net/

The National Mirror is a daily newspaper published in Nigeria. It has a tabloid format. The National Mirror was founded by Prince Emeka Obasi in 2006. Editions include the Daily Mirror, Saturday Mirror and Sunday Mirror. In August 2008 Barrister Jimoh Ibrahim acquired 100% of the shares of the National Mirror. On 5 May 2010 Global Media Mirror Limited, publishers of National Mirror, took over Newswatch Communications Limited, publishers of Newswatch weekly news magazine.
