= Maps Maponyane =

South African model, television presenter and entrepreneur

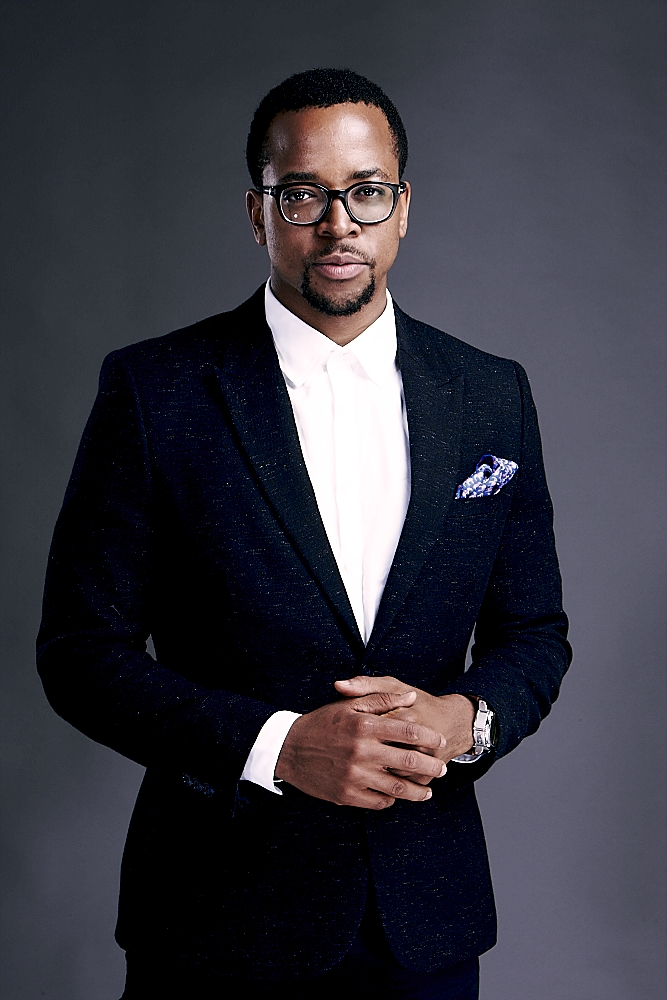
- Maponyane in 2014
- Born: Masego Maponyane; 16 March 1990 (age 36); Soweto, Gauteng, South Africa
- Education: St John's College, Johannesburg
- Alma mater: University of the Witwatersrand
- Occupations: Model; television presenter; actor; voice over artist; fashion designer; creative consultant; media socialite; entrepreneur; professional MCM
- Years active: 2009–present
- Known for: GQ Best Dressed Man 2011; Cosmopolitan Sexiest Man 2013
- Height: 6 ft 1 in (185 cm)
- Parent: Marks Maponyane (Father)
- Website: mapsmaponyane.com

Masego "Maps" Maponyane (born 16 March 1990) is a South African television presenter, actor, fashion designer, speaker, model, creative consultant, voice over artist, philanthropist and business entrepreneur.

== Career ==
While taking a year off his schooling in 2009, Maponyane started attending modelling and acting auditions, where he attained his first modelling campaign, while working as an assistant to Lucilla Booyzen, Founder of SA Fashion Week.

Maponye was named GQ's "Best Dressed Man" in 2011 and Cosmopolitan Magazine's "Sexiest South African Man" in 2013.

He was a speaker at the Tomorrow's Leaders Convention in March 2015.

In 2015, Maponyane starred in a lead role on South African spoof comedy series The Real Jozi A-Listers, alongside fellow South African entertainers Da L.E.S, Trevor Gumbi and his best friend Tol-A$$-Mo.

Maponyane is well known for playing a lead role in the South African film Tell Me Sweet Something, alongside good friend and fellow South African actress Nomzamo Mbatha. The film was released in South African theaters on September 4, 2015. The film was removed from major South African cinemas about 5 weeks after release by Ster Kinekor, despite having generated R1 million in the first five days and having done well.
