= Africa Movie Academy Awards =

African film industry award ceremony

Africa Movie Academy Awards (AMAA)
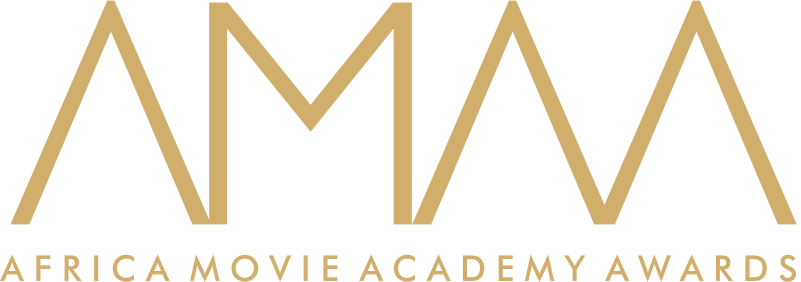
- Africa Movie Academy Awards logo
- Country: Nigeria
- Presented by: Africa Film Academy
- First award: 2005; 21 years ago
- Website: ama-awards.com/en/home

The Africa Movie Academy Awards (AMAA) is an annual entertainment award ceremony, presented to recognize excellence among African and non-African professionals, who have contributed to the African film industry. The award was founded by Peace Anyiam-Osigwe currently run by the Africa Film Academy. It is regarded as one of Africa's most notable film events, and have been sometimes referenced as the "African Oscars".

== History ==
The first Africa Movie Academy Awards was held in Yenagoa, Bayelsa State, Nigeria, on 30 May 2005. All other subsequent African Academy Awards before 2012 were held at the same venue, except for the 2008 AMAA Awards, which was moved to Abuja, FCT, for security reasons. In 2012, the awards ceremony was held at Eko Hotels and Suites, Victoria Island, Lagos, in Lagos State. The 9th and 10th edition saw AMAA returning to Yenagoa, while the 2015 ceremony was held outside Nigeria for the first time.

They have been hosted in various Nigerian cities, usually in Lagos, and once internationally in Kigali, Rwanda, in the year 2018. The ceremonies have been held at different venues within these locations, including the Jewel Aeida Hall, Eko Hotels and Suites, Balmoral Center, and the Landmark Event Centre in Lagos. Over time, the AMAA has expanded its reach beyond Nigeria. Though detailed archival venue data is limited, ceremonies have drawn global attention, through strategic host cities and online formats particularly during the COVID-19 pandemic. This approach reflects AMAA's evolving commitment to inclusion and accessibility across the African continent and beyond.

=== Jury members ===
- Berni Goldblat 2007–present
- John Akomfrah
- Steve Ayorinde
- Keith Shiri
- June Givanni
- Hyginus Ekwuazi
- Shaibu Husseini
- Ayuko Babu
- Asantewa Olatunji
- Dorothee Wenner 2005–present
- Charles Burnett 2014–present
- Filippe Savadogo 2014–present
- Amaka Igwe 2005

== Categories ==
The AMAA statuette

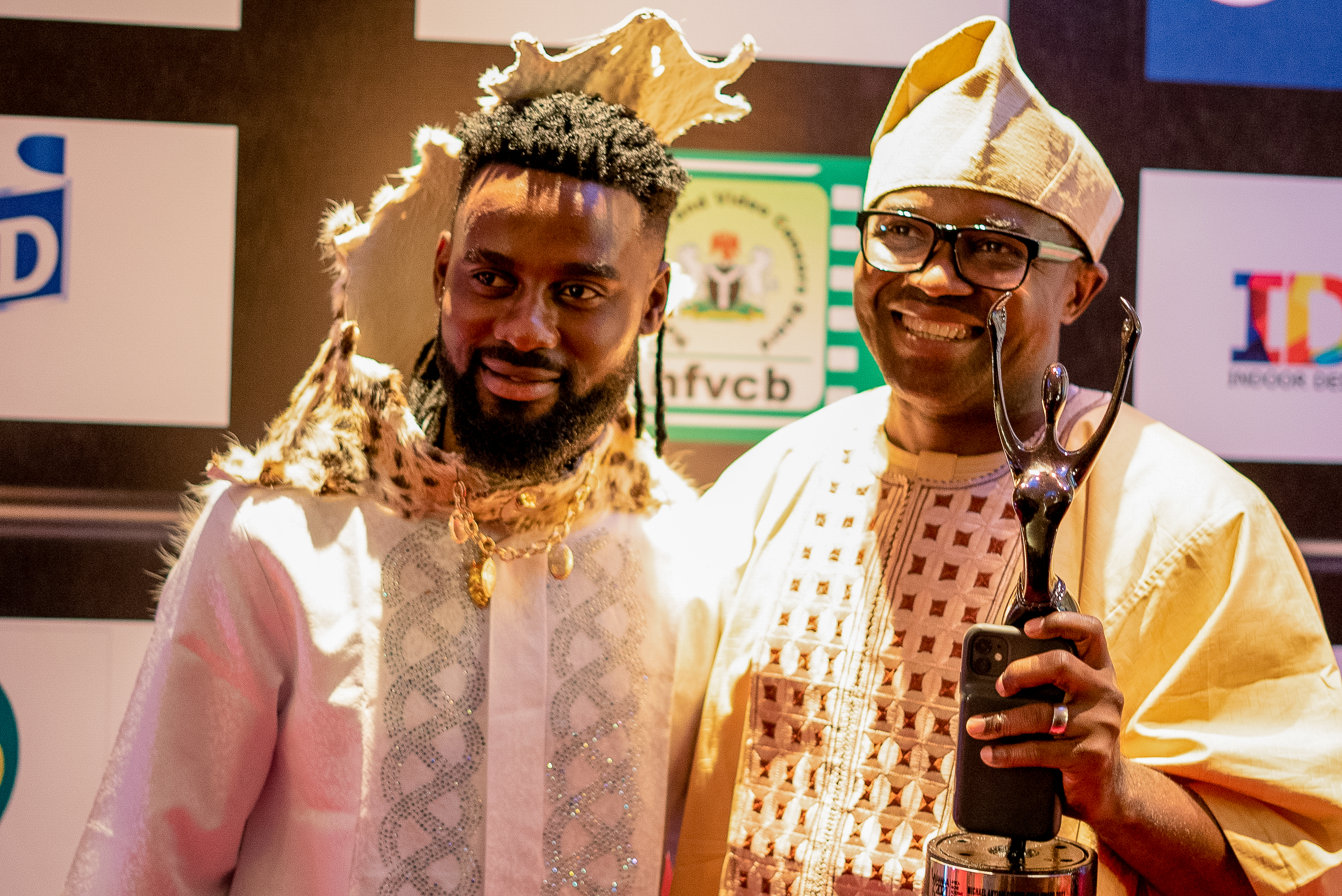
Nigerian director Obi Emelonye holding, the 2021 Michael Anyiam Osigwe Award for Best Film by an African Living Abroad

As of 2017, the Africa Movie Academy Awards had 28 merit categories. They include:

- Best Short Film: since 2010
- Best Documentary: since 2006
- Best Diaspora Feature: since 2011
- Best Diaspora Documentary: since 2011
- Best Animation: since 2008
- Achievement in Production Design: since 2008
- Achievement in Costume Design: since 2005
- Achievement in Make-Up: since 2005
- Achievement in Soundtrack: since 2005
- Achievement in Visual Effects: since 2005
- Achievement in Sound: since 2005
- Achievement in Cinematography: since 2005
- Achievement in Editing: since 2005
- Best Film by an African Living Abroad: (2008; 2010–2013; 2015–present)
- Best Comedy Film
- Best Actor in a Leading Role: since 2005
- Best Actress in a Leading Role: since 2005
- Best First Feature Film by a Director
- Best Diaspora Short Film
- Achievement in Screenplay: since 2005
- Best Nigerian Film: since 2007
- Best Film in an African Language: since 2005
- Most Promising Actor: since 2006
- Best Child Actor
- Best Actor in a Supporting Role: since 2005
- Best Actress in a Supporting Role: since 2005
- Best Director: since 2005
- Best Film: since 2005

=== Discontinued categories ===
Several categories have been renamed, retired, or merged. Below is a list of some of the retired categories.

Last awarded year	Category Name	Last Winner
2006	Best Soap	Desperate Millionaires
2006	Best Marketer	A-Z Movies
2006	Best Original Effects	Day of Atonement
2008	Most Outstanding Actress Indigenous	Doris Simeon
2010	Achievement in Art Direction	The Figurine
2008	Most Outstanding Actor Indigenous	Ayo Akinwale
2013	Achievement in Lighting	Moi Zaphira

=== Special categories ===
- Lifetime Achievement Awards (2005–2007; 2013–present)
- Special Recognition of Pillars of Nollywood (2013 only)
- Special Jury Award (2012–present)
- Madiba Africa Vision Awards (2014 only)
- Best Film for Women Empowerment (2014 only)

== Impact ==
AMAA has cemented its role as a catalyst for African cinema. It brings visibility to films in indigenous languages, supports diaspora narratives, and honours technical excellence. The awards foster cross-continental collaboration, spotlight African talent globally, and inspire the next generation of filmmakers.

== See also ==
- List of Africa Movie Academy Awards ceremonies
