= 2010 Ghana Movie Awards =

Movie Awards

The 2010 Ghana Movie Awards was the maiden edition of the ceremony to reward cinematic achievement in Ghana Film Industry. The event was held at the Golden Tulip Hotel, Accra on 25 December 2010. Sinking Sands, Juliet Ibrahim, Nadia Buari, Yvonne Okoro, Majid Michel, John Dumelo & Genevieve Nnaji were among the winners.

== Awards ==
Best Actor in a Leading Role (English)

- Senanu Gbedawu (Check Mate)
- Majid Michel (The Beast)
- J.O.T Agyemany (I Sing of a Well)
- Prince Osei (Kiss Me If You Can)
- Eddie Nartey (Kiss Me If You Can)
- Van Vicker (Dna Test)
- Ruffy Samuel (Love & Lust)

Best Actress in a Leading Role (English)

- Martha Ankomah (Kiss Me If You Can)
- Akorfa Edjeani Asiedu (I Sing of a Well)
- Ama K. Abebrese (Sinking Sands)
- Lydia Forson (A Sting in a Tale)
- Lucky Lawson (Desperate To Survive)
- Jackie Appiah, Yvonne Okoro, Juliet Ibrahim & Roselyn Ngissah (4 Play)

Best Actor in a Leading Role (Local)

- Kofi Adu a.k.a. Agya Koo (Ama Ghana)
- Akwesi Boadi A.K.A Akrobetu (Sika Akuaba)
- Francis Kusi (Yaa Asantewaa War)
- Timothy Bentum (Devil's Seed)
- Ebenezer Donkor (Madam Moke)

Best Actress in a Leading Role (Local)

- Rose Mensah A.K.A Kyeiwaa
- Emelia Brobbery (Tumi)
- Vivian Jill (Ama Ghana)
- Mercy Asiedu (Abrokyire Beyie)
- Theresah Mensah (Yaa Asantewaa War)

Best Actor in a Supporting Role (English)

- John Dumelo (The Game)
- Ekow Blankson (Check Mate)
- Ekow Smith Asante (Naked Faces)
- Kofi Adjorlolo (Beast)
- Adjetey Anang (A Sting in a Tale)
- Kweku Sintim Misa (Check Mate)
- Omar Sheriff Captan (4 Play)
- Gavivina Tamakloe (Black Mail)
- Chris Attoh (Sinking Sands)

Best Actress in a Supporting Role (English)

- Nadia Buari (Check Mate)
- Yvonne Nelson (The Game)
- Beverly Afaglo (The Game)
- Rama Brew (Who Loves Me)
- Kalsoume Sinare (Trinity)
- Naa Ashorkor (Check Mate)
- Khareema Aguiar (Check Mate)
- Nana Hayford (Beast)
- Doris Sackitey (Sinking Sands)

Best Actor in a Supporting Role (Local)

- Kofi Davis Essuman (Adults Only)
- Ofori Attah (Awieye)
- Clement Bonney (Ama Ghana)
- Kofi Laing (Ama Ghana)
- Lord Kenya (Devil's Seed)
- Samuel Ofori (Akrasi Burger)
- William Addo (Madam Moke)

Best Actress in a Supporting Role (Local)

- Nana Ama McBrown (Madam Moke)
- Barbara Newton (Abrokyire Bayie)
- Pearl Kugblenu (Devil's Seed)
- Alexis Ntsiakoh (Abrokyire Bayie)
- Gloria Osei Safo (Madam Moke)

Best Writing/Adapted/Original Screenplay

- Leila Djansi (I Sing Of a Well)
- Leila Djansi (Sinking Sands)
- Shirley Frimpong-Manso (A Sting in a Tale)
- Benjamin K. Adu (Ama Ghana)
- Kobbi Rana (Kiss Me If You Can)

Best Visual Effects

- Barry Isa Quaye (Flash Fever)
- Afra Marley (The Game)
- Ken Attoh (A Sting in a Tale)
- Godfrey Grant (A Sting In A Tale)
- Kalifa Adams (Devil’s Seed)

Best Wardrobe

- Mabel Germain (Sinking Sands)
- Lydia Laryea (A Sting in a Tale)
- Samira Yakubu (Black Mail)
- George Atoba (Ama Ghana)

Best Original Song

- Who Loves Me (Wutah)
- Delilah (Ofori Amponsah)
- Kiss Me If You Can (Rana)
- A Sting In A Tale (VIP)
- Ama Ghana (Patrick Adu)
- Game (Bisa Kdei)
- A Sting in a Tale (4×4)
- Chelsea (Dasebre Dwamena)

Best Directing - English

- Shirley Frimpong-Manso (A Sting in a Tale)
- Kobbi Rana (Kiss Me If You Can)
- Leila Djansi (Sinking Sands)
- Patrick Yadaah (DNA Test)
- Socrate Safo (Adults Only)

Best Directing - Local

- Omar Sheriff Captan (Delilah)
- Asare Bediako (Tumi)
- Frank Gharbin (Ama Ghana)
- Albert Kudovu (Abrokyire Bayie)
- Kweku Twumasi (Yaa Asantewaa)

Best Editing

- Afra Marley (The Game (2010 film))
- Afra Marley (Trinity)
- Nana A. Manso (A Sting in a Tale)
- Fred Agyepong (Flash Fever)

Best Cinematography

- Bob J (Check Mate)
- Bob J (A Sting in a Tale)
- Prince Nyarko (Ama Ghana)
- Samuel Gyandoh (Chelsea (film))

Discovery of the Year

- Emoimogen Hogen (Trinity)
- Joshua Sarpong (Ama Ghana)
- Nadia Acha-Kang (The Game (2010 film))
- Diana Pealore (Beast)

Best Makeup

- Lydia (Trinity)
- Jude Odeh (Ama Ghana)
- Jane A. Williams (Check Mate)
- Ruth Mensah (I Sing Of a Well)
- Lyrdyna Abuhipsah (Beast)

Best Picture

- Ama Ghana
- I Sing of a Well
- Sinking Sands
- A Sting in a Tale
- Chelsea (film)
- Check Mate

Best Story

- Who Loves Me
- Sinking Sands
- A Sting in a Tale
- The Game (2010 film)

Best Art Direction

- The Game (2010 film)
- Check Mate
- Sinking Sands
- Ama Ghana

Best Actor - West Africa Collaboration

- Yemi Blaq (Sinking Sands)
- Ramsey Nouah (Guilty Pleasures)
- Desmond Elliot (Guilty Pleasures)
- Uti Nwachukwu (Busting Out (film))

Best Actress - West Africa Collaboration

- Genevieve Nnaji (Silent Scandals)
- Nse Ikpe Etim (Guilty Pleasures (2009 film))
- Tonto Dikeh (Love & Lust)
- Uche Jombo (Nollywood Hustlers)
- Omotola Jalade Ekeinde (Private Storm)
- Mercy Johnson (Shakira)

Best Movie - African Collaboration

- Sinking Sands
- Guilty Pleasures (2009 film)
- Love & Lust
- Private Storm
- Bursting Out (film)

Best Movie Score

- The Game (2010 film)
- Ama Ghana
- A Sting in a Tale
- Kiss Me If You Can
- 4 Play (film)
- Sinking Sands

Favorite Actor

- Kofi Adjorlolo

Favorite Actress

- Yvonne Nelson
