= 2020 Ghana Movie Awards =

Ghanaian film awards

The closing date for submissions of 2020 Ghana Movie Awards was November 20, 2020. The 2020 Ghana Movie Awards was the 10th edition of the Ghana movie awards which was held on Wednesday 30 December 2020. It was held virtual due to the COVID-19 pandemic.

== Nominations ==
Frank Gharbin, Yvonne Nelson, Yvonne Okoro, Alexandra Amon, Habiba Sinare, Jackie Appiah, Jessica William, Emelia Brobbey and many others was nominated for the awards.

== Winners ==
=== Cinematography ===
Fix us – John Passah

=== Production design ===
Heroes of Africa – Bismark Gyamerah

=== Makeup and hairstyling ===
Heroes of Africa – Zion Train.

=== Visual effects ===
18 – Kobby Okyere

=== Costume and wardrobe ===
Heroes of Africa – George Atobra

=== Sound editing & mixing ===
Fix us – Berni Anti

=== EDITING ===
Ogbozo – Solomon Tamakloe

=== Writing adapted or original screenplay ===
Fix us – Pascal Amanfo

=== Music original song ===
Ogbozo – Blackk Rasta

=== Music original score ===
Fix us – Berni Anti

=== Best Animation Movie ===
Ill-Mile

=== Best Short Film ===
The Wrong One – Kobby Maxwell

=== DISCOVERY ===
Irene Logan – Fix us

=== Best actress – African collaboration ===
Temi Otedola – Citation

=== Best actor – African collaboration ===
Sam Dede – Foreigners God

=== Best movie – African collaboration ===
Citation – Kunle Afolayan

=== A performance by an actress in a supporting role ===
Roselyn Ngissah – Ogbozo

Michelle Attoh – Fix us

=== A performance by an actor in a supporting role ===
Van Vicker – Heroes of Africa

=== A performance by an actress in a leading role ===
Habiba Sinari – 18

Yvonne Nelson, Yvonne Okoro, Alexandra Amon – Fix Us

=== A performance by an actor in a leading role ===
Bernard Adusi-Poku – Heroes of Africa

=== DIRECTING ===
Heroes of Africa – Frank Fiifi Gharbin

=== Best picture ===
Heroes of Africa – Frank Fiifi Gharbin
