= Sun City (TV series) =

Ghanaian TV series

- Screenplay by: Luca Brasi
- Directed by: Joseph Taylor (season 1); Abiko Banchi Eghagha (season 2)
- Starring: Suzzy Williams; Benjamin Kwadey; Van Vicker; Gavivina Tamakloe
- Music by: Amandzeba Nat Brew
- Country of origin: Ghana
- Original language: English

Production
- Producer: Kwame Boadi
- Editors: Charles Nartey Mezo (season 1); Adwoa Prah (season 2)
- Running time: 30 mins
- Production company: Deltrac Media

Original release
- Release: 2003 – 2005

Sun City is a Ghanaian television series produced by Deltrac Media in 2003 which was aired on GTV.

== Plot ==
The television series was set in the university environment to tell a story of the relationships, studying and other daily experiences of university students.

== Production ==
The production set were on University of Ghana, Legon and the University of Cape Coast in the Central Region. The theme song was done by Amandzeba.

== Cast ==
- Suzzy Williams
- Ekow Smith-Asante
- Benjamin Kwadey
- Van Vicker
- Gavivina Tamakloe
- Albert Kuvodu
- Kojo Dadson
- Ekow Blankson
- Nii Odoi Mensah
- Andy Nii Akrashie
- Prince Olani Yeboah
- Jane Heidi Aklamanu
- Albert Jackson-Davis
- Ekow Bissiw Jones
- Nana Yaw Aboagye-Saah
- Nii Saka Brown
- Joana Sackey
- Annette Obeng
- Roland Adom
