= Aloe Vera (film) =

2020 Ghanaian film

AloeVera
- Directed by: Peter Sedufia
- Produced by: Manaa Abdallah; Anny Araba Adams
- Cinematography: Richard Kelly Doe; Isaac A. Mensah
- Edited by: Afra Marley; Peter Sedufia
- Music by: Reynolds Addow (Worlasi)
- Release date: 2020
- Country: Ghana
- Language: English
- Budget: $150,000
- Box office: $240,000

Aloe Vera is a 2020 Ghanaian film produced by Manaa Abdallah and Anny Araba Adams as co-producers and directed and written by Peter Sedufia.

== Plot ==
Two groups of people live in the same village, the Aloes and the Veras. There is a harsh rivalry between them that endures even with the children, and each side is marked by their own trademark color. When the children of the town leaders, Aloewin and Veraline, fall in love, they must find a way to bring the two communities together despite the animosity. The community later becomes one as a result of the relationship between the two. In a land where the people have divided themselves because of a disagreement long ago, a man and woman from the different sides fall in love. Despite the efforts of their families to keep them apart, they eventually become the reason the community becomes one again.

== Cast ==
- Aaron Adatsi as Aloewin
- Ngozi Viola Adikwu as Verari
- Benjamin Adaletey as Paa Vera
- Kofi Adjorlolo as Papa Aloe
- Ben Affat as Aloeway
- Eric Agyemfra as Vera Man 1
- Kobina Amissah-Sam as Father
- Rhoda Okobea Ampene as Vera Woman 1
- Fred Nii Amugi as Mr. Aloemele
- Adjetey Anang as Aloedin
- Akofa Edjeani Asiedu as Mama Aloe
- Edinam Atatsi as Midwife
- Mawuko Awumah as Mr. Aloegede
- Alexandra Ayirebi-Acquah as Veraline
- Grace Omaboe
- Nana Ama Mcbrown as Maa Vera
- Peter Ritchie as Vera Man 2
- Priscilla Opoku Agyemang as Aloemaria
- Fiifi Coleman
- Gloria Safo as Verani
- Roselyn Ngissah as Aloemay
- Beverly Afaglo as Mother
- Naa Ashorkor as Veranda
- Solomon Fixon Owoo as Aloekay
- Adamu Zaaki as Aloebay

== Production ==
The film's title was announced in 2019, alongside an announcement that director Peter Sedufia was constructing 100 homes in order to create a village for filming in the Dabala, Volta region of Ghana. Actors Priscilla Opoku Agyemang, Nana Ama Mcbrown, and Roselyn Ngissah were also named as performing in the movie. Worlasi was brought on to provide the film's soundtrack. Peter Sedufia has described the movie as an "upgrade of his previous project, and it is designed to give people something worth their money and time." For this reason, its production was not a hasty one. Sedufia extended the film's post-production reach beyond Ghana. Ghanaian editing was followed by sound treatment in Germany and final refinements in France. He emphasized that European sound facilities outmatched local options.

Peter Sedufia did not only direct the film; he personally financed and built a complete film village in Dabala, Volta Region, to serve as a permanent production resource. His vision was that the set could either support fellow filmmakers in the region or be handed over to Dabala's residents as a community resource. Aloe Vera had a budget of approximately $150,000 but went over budget due to extended filming dates after heavy rains damaged filming equipment. According to Peter Sedufia, he spent $235,000. He attributed financing to contributions from South Africa, France’s Canal+, Ghanaian investors, and his own funds. The rains also caused severe damage to the film set, which Sedufia described as a major challenge during production.

== Release ==
Aloe Vera premiered in Ghana on March 6, 2020, in Accra. A trailer was released to promote the film, and Glitz Africa wrote that "enveloped with a stellar cast as well as opted blue and yellow costumes that give viewers a fair understanding of the storyline governing the film, ‘Aloe Vera’ reveals a situation of tribal discrimination causing two young adults drowned in the rivers of love not to be together." Tickets for the premiere sold out quickly, and GhanaWeb has credited the film's social media campaign for its success with moviegoers.

The film eventually streamed on Netflix starting August 5, 2022.

== Reception ==
Citinewsroom reviewed Aloe Vera, writing that "'Aloe Vera's' heart is there for everyone to see, and it’s definitely in the right place. The screenplay has the weight of a feather, and it isn’t moving any narrative mountains. But the predictability doesn’t stop it from being the feel-good hit I didn’t see coming."

GhMovieFreak also reviewed Aloe Vera, noting that the film's strongest point is its art direction and production design, commenting that "the blend of blues and yellows is visual candy that you can’t seem to get enough of in this film." It also praises the on-screen chemistry between the leads.

Report Afrique also highlights the film's creative courage and inventiveness. The premiere was a huge success, with fans arriving dressed in the film's signature colors (blue for "Aloes" and yellow for "Veras").

When Aloe Vera was opened at Silverbird Cinemas (Accra Mall & West Hills) on March 6, 2020, it didn’t just sell out; local press and exhibitors described it as an unprecedented crush of moviegoers. Fans arrived dressed in the film’s signature colors (blue for “Aloes,” yellow for “Veras”), queues spilled through the lobbies, and extra late-night shows were added on the fly. Multiple outlets framed the turnout as record-breaking for the venues, with some reports noting it outpaced the frenzy around Black Panther’s opening at those cinemas. In an interview, director Peter Sedufia shared that Aloe Vera’s premiere had become the “biggest premiere they ever had” at Silverbird Cinemas and “even beat ‘Black Panther’” in terms of visitor numbers during opening screenings.
