= Sidechic Gang =

2018 Ghanaian film

- Directed by: Peter Sedufia
- Story by: Rachel Adikwu; Peter Sedufia
- Produced by: OldFilm Productions
- Starring: Nana Ama McBrown, Lydia Forson, Sika Osei, Adjetey Anang, Bernard Nyarko, Eddie Kufuor, Akofa Edjeane
- Release date: 2018
- Country: Ghana
- Language: English

Side Chick Gang is a 2018 Ghanaian drama/comedy movie directed by Peter Sedufia and produced by Oldfilm productions. The movie starred famous actors and actresses such as Aaron Adatsi, Ricky Adelayitor, and Beverly Afaglo amongst others.

== Synopsis ==
Three female friends who quit their jobs as ushers to pursue a job which pays more and better than their old jobs set up a "sidechic gang". The Sidechic gang only provides services to women. This makes the men very unhappy with the sudden popularity of their exposé. The job assigns them to clamp down on husbands or boyfriends who are cheating on their wives or girlfriends. The gang takes on a job from a rich man which is their biggest deal on his suspected cheating fiancée. The greatest of their opposition is the aggrieved men who benefited from the services of side chicks.

== Cast ==
- Nana Ama McBrown as Pokua
- Lydia Forson as Baaba
- Adjetey Anang as Sefa
- Bernard Nyarko as Mr. Sampah
- Sika Osei as Fella
- Beverly Afaglo as Mrs. Owoo
- Aaron Adatsi as Jesse
- Eddie Kufour as Mr. Appiah
- Stacy Afful as Young Lady
- Daniel Delong as Car Dealer
- Christabel Ekeh as Lady
- Akofa Edjeane as Aunty Vero

== Nominations ==
- Africa Movie Academy Awards for Best Director (2018)
- Africa Movie Academy awards for Best Film (2018)
- Africa Movie Academy Award for Best Comedy (2018)
- Africa Movie Academy Award for Best Achievement In Sound (2018)
- Africa Movie Academy Award for Best Actress In Leading Role (2018)
