= Clemento Suarez =

Ghanaian comedian and actor

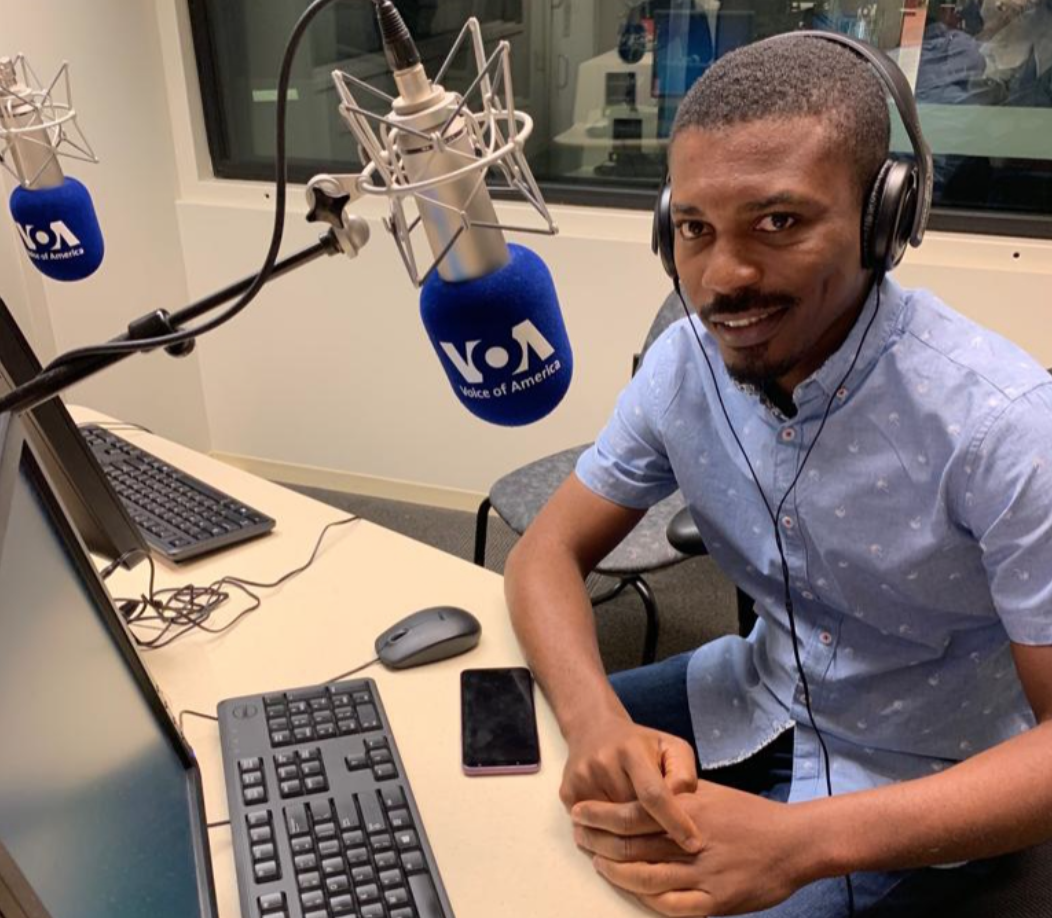
- Born: Clement Ashiteye
- Other name: Clemento Suarez
- Citizenship: Ghanaian
- Education: University of Ghana
- Occupations: Comedian & Actor
- Years active: 2011–present
- Notable work: Keteke; Kejetia vs Makola
- Spouse: Sylvia Bioh
- Father: Victor Tetteh
- Awards: Man of the Year, 2020 Entertainment EMY Awards

Clement Ashiteye, known as Clemento Suarez, is a Ghanaian comedian and actor.

== Early life ==
His tertiary education was at the School of Performing Arts at the University of Ghana in Legon where he graduated in 2010.

== Career ==
After studying the industry, Clemento Suarez started out his career in 2011 by doing unpaid work. He later decided to become a professional comedian. Clemento has worked with creative directors such as Latif Abubakar, and has featured in the Ghanaian TV series Kejetia vs Makola. He co-hosted the third edition of the 3Music Awards with O. B. Amponsah which was the first virtual award concert organized in Ghana during lock-down period because of COVID-19. He was named together with Gladys Owiredu by organisers of the Ghana Outstanding Women Awards (GOWA) as hosts of this year's (2021) Ghana Outstanding Women Awards (GOWA) awards ceremony.

== Filmography ==
- Gallery of Comedy
- Thank for Idiots
- Romantic Nonsense
- Sweet Dreams & Nightmares
- What Can Come Can Come
- Flagstaff House
- Mallams & Pastors
- I Can't Think Far
- Dinner For Promotion
- Blue Back
- Could This Be Love (2014)
- Prison Graduates
- Ama 2G
- Ladder
- Keteke (2017) as Train Man 2
- Door 2 Door (2017)
- You Play Me
- I Play You
- Bukom
- Upstairs & Downstairs
- The Inspection
- Master and 3 Maids
- Yellow Café and Wofa Kay
- Royal Diadem
- Kejetia vs Makola
- 3 idiots and a wiseman (2019)
- Accra We Dey
- Away Bus (2019)
- Freedom and Justice (2021)

== Awards ==
Year	Award	Body	Result
2017	Best Comic Actor	GH Comedy Awards	Won
2019	Best Comedian	Fashion & Lifestyle Ghana	Won
2019	Best Comedian	GH Entertainment Awards USA	Won
2019	Best Male Comedian	GH Actors & Entertainers Awards	Won
2020	Man of the Year Entertainment	EMY Awards	Won
2021	Most Popular Comedian of the Year	2nd edition of Comedy and Poetry Awards	Won

== Personal life ==
Clemento Suarez married his long-time girlfriend Sylvia Bioh on 24 October 2020.
