= Devil in the Detail (film) =

2014 film directed by Shirley Frimpong-Manso

- Theatrical poster
- Directed by: Shirley Frimpong-Manso
- Produced by: Ken Attoh; Shirley Frimpong-Manso
- Starring: Nse Ikpe Etim; Adjetey Anang; Ecow Smith-Asante; Ama Ampofo
- Cinematography: Ken Attoh; Eric Opong Appiah
- Production company: Sparrow Production
- Release date: February 14, 2014
- Running time: 94 minutes
- Countries: Ghana; Nigeria

Devil in the Detail is a 2014 Ghanaian-Nigerian romantic thriller film directed by Shirley Frimpong-Manso starring Nse Ikpe Etim and Adjetey Anang.

It premiered at Silverbird Cinemas, Accra, Ghana, on 14 February 2014. The film tells the story of a happily married couple whose relationship is torn apart by infidelity.

== Plot ==
They have everything in their life; money, fame and happiness. They were a perfect married couple but their craze for sex and having affairs with others ruined everything.

== Cast ==
- Nse Ikpe Etim as Helen Ofori
- Adjetey Anang as Ben Ofori
- Ama Ampofo as Claudia
- Mawuli Gavor as Sam
- Ecow Smith-Asante as Fred
