= Marleen Hutchful =

Ghanaian actress (1986–2022)

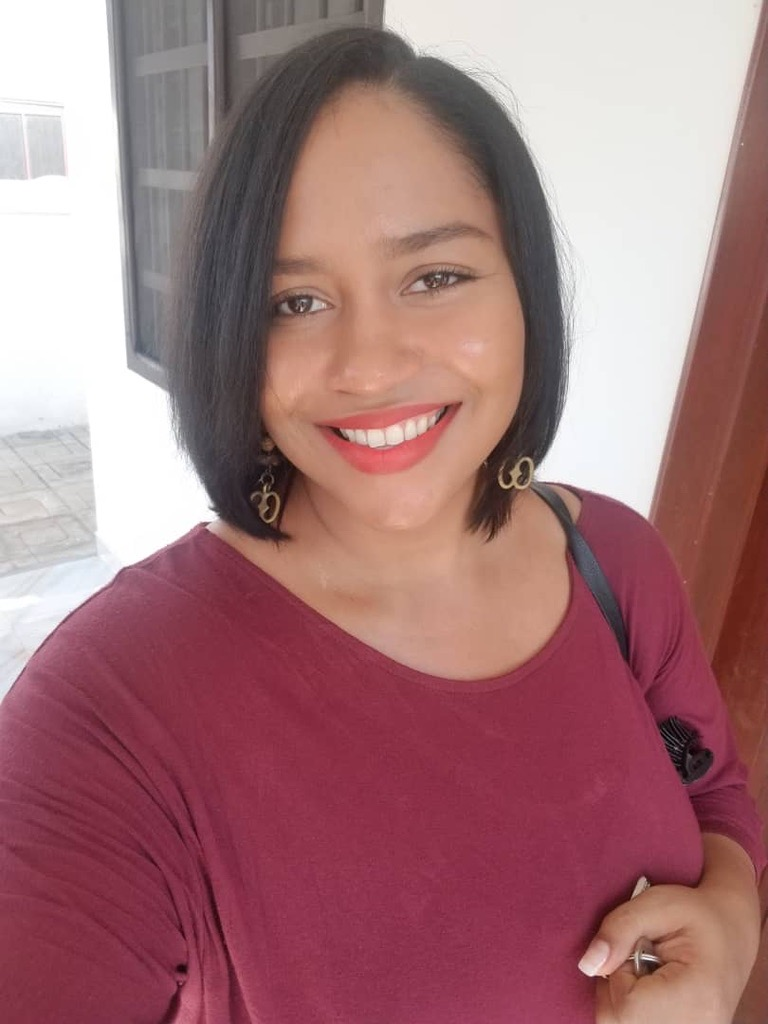
- Born: 27 October 1986; Accra, Ghana
- Died: 11 January 2022 (aged 35)
- Other name: Nee Mensah
- Education: Ashesi University; Ghana International School
- Alma mater: National Film and Television Institute
- Occupations: Actress; Program coordinator; Marketing manager
- Known for: Things We Do for Love
- Spouse: Claud Kweku Ampoful Hutchful
- Children: 2

Marleen Anmortsoo Hutchful (née Mensah; 27 October 1986 – 11 January 2022) was a Ghanaian actress. She was cast in the Ghanaian TV series Things We Do for Love.

== Early life and education ==
Marleen Anmortsoo Mensah was born in Accra on 27 October 1986. Her parents were Cyril Neeborquaye and Renate Ilse Mensah. She had her primary education at Ghana International School(GIS) and her tertiary education at Ashesi University. From Ashesi University she obtained a degree in Business Administration.

== Professional life ==
Hutchful worked as a marketing manager at a Ghanaian company Amazing-U. She also worked at DreamOval as a Program Coordinator. Later, she worked as a teacher at a school called Beacon College International.

== Things We Do For Love ==
Hutchful entered the scenes of the Ghanaian series Things We Do For Love in 2000 as the character "Lois". Her role in the movie was that of a Ghanaian teenager. She was known for her distinct American accent in the movie. She acted alongside Adjetey Annan, known in the same series as Pusher.

== Personal life ==
Hutchful was married with two daughters. Her husband was Claud Kweku Ampoful Hutchful. They had two daughters: Elaine Ewuresi Hutchful and Claire Renate Kuukua Hutchful. She was a Christian.

== Death ==
Hutchful died on 11 January 2022 of acute myeloid leukemia. She was buried in Ghana on 27 January 2022 at the Lashibi Funeral Home in Accra.
