= Ama Ampofo =

Ghanaian actress (born 1991)

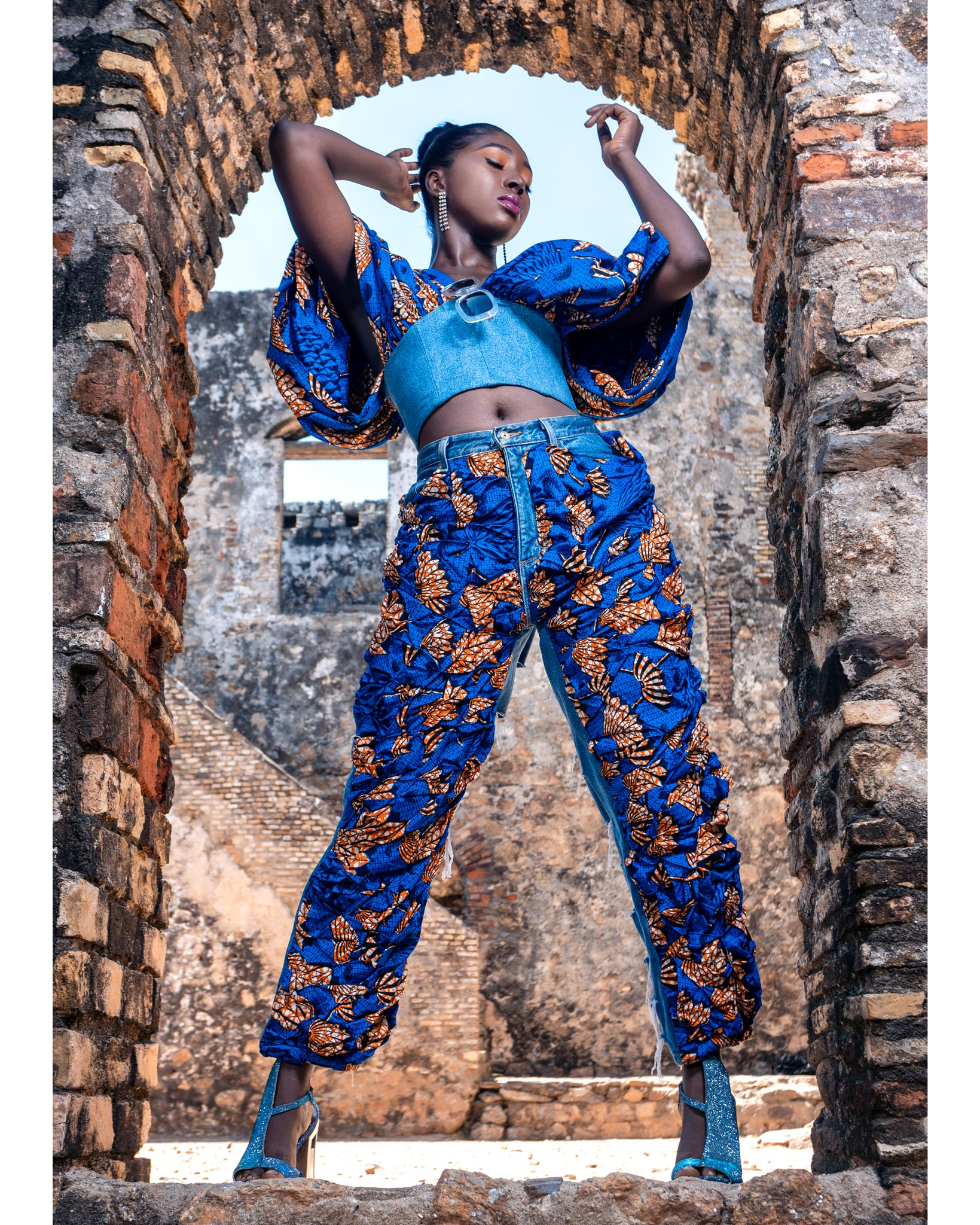
- Born: 22 June 1991 (age 35); Greater Accra Region, Ghana
- Education: University of Ghana
- Occupations: Actress, model
- Awards: 2015 Golden Movie Awards for Best Supporting Actress in the Drama
- Website: www.amaampofo.com

Ama Ampofo is a Ghanaian actress and model. The third of four children, Ama was born in Accra on 22 June 1991. In 2014, she starred as "Claudia" in Shirley Frimpong-Manso's film, Devil in the Detail, a role that earned her an Africa Movie Academy Award for Best Supporting Actress nomination and a Golden Movie award. Prior to her impressive movie debut, Ama featured in TV commercials (Fidelity Bank Ghana, Kiss Condom) and music videos (Lies by Sarkodie feat. Lil Shaker) in Ghana.

== Biography ==
Ama Ampofo was born and raised in Cantonments in the Greater Accra region of Ghana. She attended junior high school at St. Paul's Lutheran in Kanda and then transferred to Calvary International School in Teshie. After completing her secondary level education at Archbishop Porter Girls' Senior High School in Takoradi, she enrolled at the University of Ghana where she earned a bachelor's degree in History and Theatre Arts.

Even before acting became a career choice, Ama never shied away from the spotlight. She won the 2001 Golden Tulip Hotel Children Playback Show, a dance competition hosted at the Accra National Theatre and further participated in the 2012 Miss Malaika Ghana, a beauty pageant reality show, making the top five finalists.

== Career ==
Ama made her acting debut in 2014 with an acclaimed performance in Shirley Frimpong-Manso’s film, Devil in the Detail, for which she won the 2015 Golden Movie Awards for Best Supporting Actress in the Drama Category and earned an Africa Movie Academy Awards nomination for Best Supporting Actress. After a hiatus from full-time acting, in 2021 Ama earned renewed critical acclaim for the leading role in Shirley Frimpong-Manso’s new film Chasing Lullaby: A Mother's Day Story and the reality TV style series Boys and Girls: The Ultimate Battle of Sexes!

Prior to acting, Ama won the 2001 Golden Tulip Hotel Children Playback Show, a dance competition hosted at the Accra National Theatre, and participated in the 2012 [Miss Malaika Ghana], a beauty pageant reality show, making the top five finalists.

== Filmography ==
- Devil in the Detail (2014) as Claudia
- Chasing Lullaby (2021)
