= Latif Abubakar =

Ghanaian playwright

- Born: Ghana
- Occupation: Playwright
- Writing career
- Genres: Drama, fiction

Latif Abubakar is a Ghanaian playwright and the chief executive director of Globe Production. He founded the organization the Globe Production in 2009 and has worked with notable actors including Ekow Smith-Asante, Adjetey Anang, Clemento Suarez, Ofori Bismarck, Pearl Darkey, Paul Quarcoo and Alexandra Bailey.

== Career ==
He was the first playwright in Ghana to live stream his play Thank God For Idiots virtually on YouTube amid ban on public gathering during the COVID-19 period.

== Plays ==
- Thank God for Idiots
- Romantic Nonsense
- I Can't Think Far
- You May Kiss the Corpse
- Saint and Sinners
- Gallery of Comedies
- The Second Coming of Nkrumah
- What Can Come Can Come
- The Legend Play
- Judas and Delilah 1 & 2
- Men Don Die
- Something must kill a man

== Awards and Achievements ==
- won the Tourism and Culture awards for his creative works in arts, culture and entertainment through his plays at the Ghana Tourism Authority.
- In 2025, won Best Project Management Professional award during the Maiden Sky Africa Awards held in Hilton Hotel in Yaoundé, Cameron.
- In collaboration with the Korean Embassy, Latif launched “Sim Mojorley”.
