= Keteke =

2017 Ghanaian film

- Directed by: Peter Sedufia
- Written by: Peter Sedufia
- Produced by: Peter Sedufia
- Starring: Clemento Suarez; Lydia Forson; Adjetey Anang
- Release date: 2017
- Country: Ghana
- Language: English

Keteke (Akan: Train) is a 2017 Ghanaian comedy film written and directed by Peter Sedufia. It was produced by Peter Sedufia and Laurene Addy.

== Plot ==
The film is set in the 1980s, when pregnant Atswei (Lydia Forson) and her husband Boi (Adjetey Anang) are trying to reach Atswei's village so she can give birth. The only source of transportation is a weekly train that they miss, forcing them to seek alternative transportation and launching them on an impromptu adventure through rural Ghana.

== Awards ==
Keteke represented Ghana at the annual Khouribja Africa Festival in Morocco, December 2018 where it received the Jury Special Mention Prize.

== Cast ==
- Edwin Acquah as Train Man 5
- Fred Nii Amugi as Old Man
- Adjetey Anang as Boi
- Lydia Forson as Atswei
- Jeneral Ntatia as Train Man 1
- Edmund Onyame as Train Man 4
- Joseph Otsiman as Young Man
- Raymond Sarfo as Train Man 3
- Clemento Suarez as Train Man 2
