= Gloria Sarfo =

Ghanaian actress

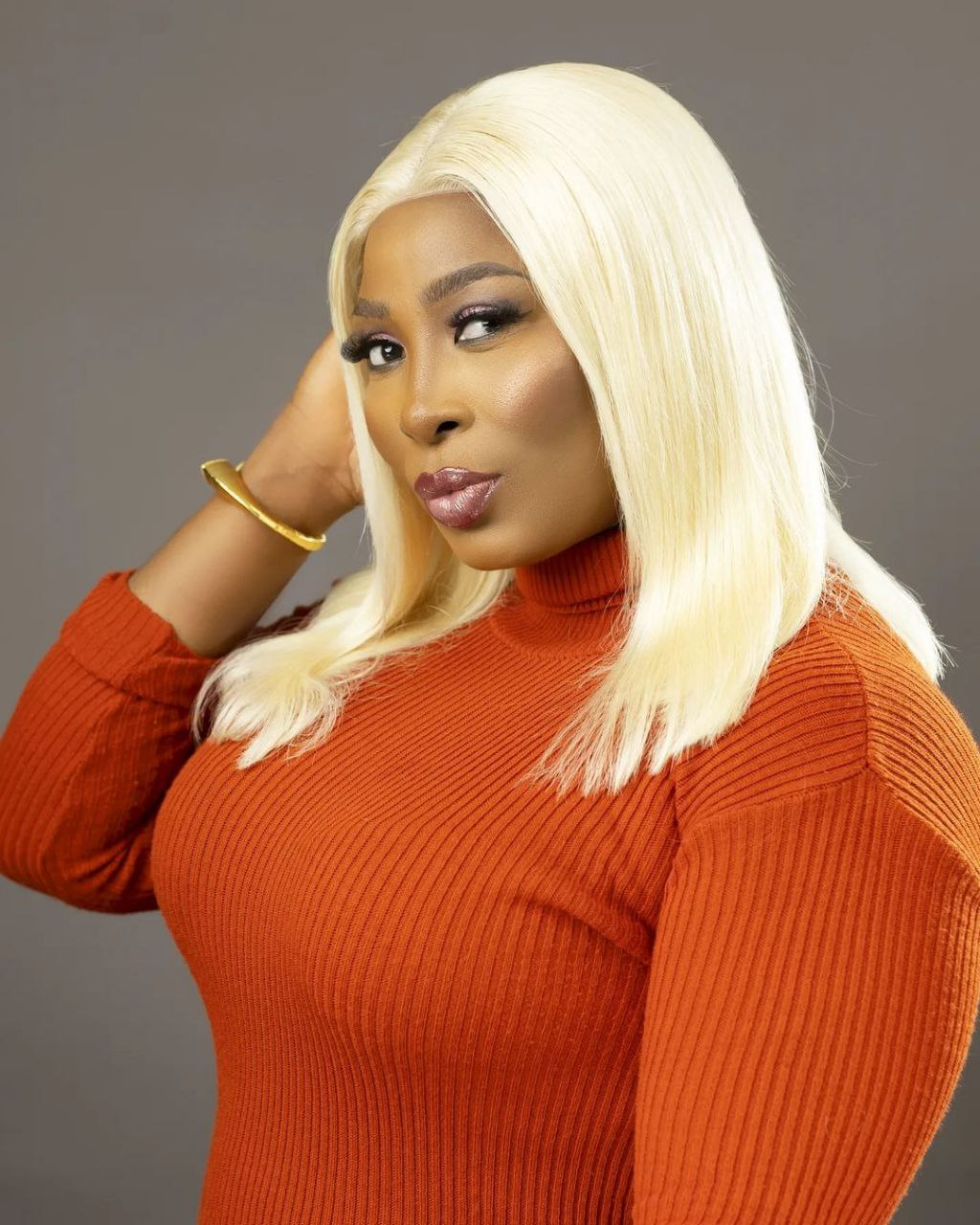
- Born: Gloria Osei Sarfo
- Occupations: Actress; television presenter
- Years active: 2000–present
- Notable work: Akwaaba; Efiewura

Gloria Osei Sarfo is a Ghanaian actress and TV presenter. She won Best Supporting Actress Award at the 2020 Africa Magic Viewers' Choice Awards for her role in Shirley Frimping Manso's The Perfect Picture - Ten Years Later.

== Career ==
Sarfo began her acting career in the mid-2000s, starring in Revele Films' Hotel Saint James. She gained popularity after playing the role of Nana Ama in Efiewura.

== Education ==
Gloria had her secondary education at the Ghana Senior High School, Koforidua. She is also an alumnus of the University of Professional Studies.

== Personal life ==
On November 7, 2024, Sarfo expressed her preference for keeping her romantic relationships private during an interview with Ayekoo Ayekoo on Accra 100.5 FM.

== Crontroversy ==
On November 2, 2024, Ghanaian actress Gloria Sarfo criticized the Africa Movie Academy Awards (AMAA) over flight issues that left Ghanaian filmmakers stranded at Kotoka International Airport.

== Awards ==
Sarfo won Best Supporting Actress at the 2020 Africa Magic Viewers' Choice Awards. She was awarded the actress of the Year at 2021 Women’s Choice Awards.

== Filmography ==
- My Mother's Heart (2005)
- Darkness of Sorrow (2006) as Ama
- Friday Night (2008) as Abigail
- Friday Night 2 (2008) as Abigail
- The Most Beautiful Hour (2012) as Mansa
- Efiewura (2001)
- Akwaaba (film) (2019)
- Living with Trisha (2012-2015 TV Series) as Tricia
- The Perfect Picture - Ten Years Later (2019) as Susanna Noye
- Baby Is Coming (2019)
- Somewhere in Africa (2011) as Yerima
- Aloe Vera (2020) as Verani
- In Exile (2021) as Lawyer Sims's Wife
- Eno (2022 TV Series) as Abena
- Coming to Africa: Welcome to Ghana (2023)
