= Samuel Ofori =

Samuel Ofori may refer to:

- Samuel Ofori (footballer, born 1996), Ghanaian football forward for Safa
- Samuel Ofori (footballer, born 1999), Ghanaian football centre-back for Ravshan Kulob
- Samuel Ofori (actor) (fl. 2004-present), Ghanaian actor and director
