= Suzzy Williams =

Ghanaian actress

- Born: 29 May 1982; Accra
- Died: 8 September 2005 (aged 23)
- Education: Tema Senior High School
- Occupation: Actor
- Notable work: Fresh Trouble; Tentacles; Ugly Side of Beauty; War for War; Together Forever; Sun-City; A Touch of Love; The Comforter; The Chosen One; Lover Boy In Ghana; Official Prostitute
- Mother: Cecilia Williams

Suzzy Williams (died 8 September 2005, aged 23) was a well-known Ghanaian television and film actor. She starred in films such as Bloody Mary, Calamity, The Comforter and Mother's Heart. Her career as an actor was launched through the African hit film Together Forever, with a screenplay by US-based Ghanaian producer and screenwriter Leila Djansi.

== Education ==
Williams attended Tema Secondary School, where she was a member of the drama group and sang at entertainment programmes.

== Death ==
She died in a car crash at Labadi in Accra at the age of 23. The accident happened on the La-Nungua highway on 8 September 2005 at about 1.30 am. She was in the car with her boyfriend. Because of her popularity, Ghana's Art Centre refused to allow her body to lie in state, fearing it would be unable to accommodate the large numbers of mourners expected. The Suzzy Williams Memorial Fund was created in her memory to aid victims of road traffic accidents.

== Selected filmography ==
- The Sisterhood
- Tentacles
- Fresh Trouble (2004-2005 TV Series)
- Superstars: The Ugly Side of Beauty
- War for War (2005)
- Together Forever
- My Mother's Heart (2005)
- Sun-City (2003-2005 TV series)
- A Touch of Love
- The Comforter
- The Chosen One (2003)
- Lover Boy In Ghana
- Official Prostitute (2005)
- Yaa Asantewaa
- Bloody Mary

== External links and sources ==
- Suzzy Williams at IMDb
- "Suzy Williams is Dead", GhanaWeb, 8 September 2005.
- "Suzzy Williams - Dead At 23", GhanaWeb.
- Daily Graphic Online
