= Beverly Afaglo =

Ghanaian actress and television presenter (1983–2026)

- Born: Beverly Afaglo Baah; 28 May 1983
- Died: 24 May 2026 (aged 42)
- Education: Ghana Institute of Journalism
- Occupations: Actress; beauty therapist
- Spouse: Eugene Kwadwo Boadu Baah
- Children: 2 daughters
- Awards: 2010 Best Actress in Comedy

Beverly Afaglo Baah (28 May 1983 – 24 May 2026) was a Ghanaian actress and television presenter.

== Background ==
Beverly hailed from the Volta Region in Ghana. She was married to Eugene Kwadwo Boadu Baah. They had two daughters.

In August 2021, Afaglo's home was damaged in a fire that lasted approximately four hours, and she reported losing most of her possessions.

=== Death ===
Afaglo died from cancer on 24 May 2026, at the age of 42.

== Career ==
Afaglo trained as a beauty therapist at the FC Institute of Beauty Therapy, Ghana, and was a student of the Ghana Institute of Journalism, where she studied journalism and public relations. Aside from acting, she operated Glamour Beauty Salon in Tema. She launched her new chain of businesses called Traffic Shawarma on 5 April 2024. She shared how she was unhappy about producers and directors not using old actors in their movie projects. She highlighted how casting decisions have shifted from skin-tone bias to favoring those with strong personal networks. She noted that being an actor or actress is no longer about talent, but rather one needs to have the connections to be in movies. According to her, this trend diminishes the quality of film production.

== Business ==
Aside from acting, Afaglo, who was a family woman, was able to combine her acting career with being a serial businesswoman. She founded B.A.B. Handyman Ghana Ltd., a service platform offering plumbing, electrical, and home repairs.

== Selected filmography ==
- Return of Beyonce (2006) as Doris
- Crime to Christ (2007) Sharon
- Girls Connection (2008) as Doris
- Prince's Bride
- Never Again (2010) as Gita
- Turn Me On (2010)
- The Game (2010)
- Single Six (2011) as Kendra
- Equatorial Escape (2011)
- Secret Burden (2012)
- The King's Bride
- Total Exchange
- PlayBoy
- Big Girls Club
- CEO
- About to Wed
- A Northern Affair (2014) as Biana
- Bachelors (2014)
- I love you But (2017)
- Brown Sugar (2018)
- Sidechic Gang (2018)
- Aloe Vera (2020) as Mother
- I Hate You Too (2021) as Katherine
- Every Woman Has a Story (2023) as Stella

== Awards and nominations ==
Year	Prize	Industry	Recipient	Result	Ref
2010	Best Actress in a Supporting Role (English)	2010 Ghana Movie Awards	Herself	Nominated	
2010	Best Actress in Comedy	Terracotta Awards (Nigeria)	Herself	Won	
