= Rebecca (2016 film) =

- Directed by: Shirley Frimpong-Manso
- Produced by: Shirley Frimpong Manso; Ken Attoh
- Starring: Yvonne Okoro; Joseph Benjamin
- Cinematography: Ken Attoh
- Edited by: Shirley Frimpong Manso
- Production company: Sparrow Production
- Release date: 22 January 2016 (London)
- Running time: 86 minutes
- Countries: Ghana; Nigeria

Rebecca is a 2016 Ghanaian-Nigerian film directed by Shirley Frimpong-Manso, and starring Yvonne Okoro and Joseph Benjamin. According to Manso, the film was released first in London, before Ghana due to the economic situation of the country causing reduced patronage for films. The film is the second two-cast film that features Nigerian-born actress Yvonne Okoro.

== Cast ==
- Joseph Benjamin as Clifford
- Yvonne Okoro as Rebecca
- Nii Pebie as Attacker 1
- Paakow Annan as Attacker 2

== Plot ==
The film begins with Clifford (Joseph Benjamin) and Rebecca (Yvonne Okoro) lost in the forest after their vehicle required a repair. It is revealed that Rebecca was betrothed to Clifford since their childhood. While Rebecca remained silent all through the journey and looked unbothered by the utterances by her new husband, Clifford expresses reluctance on being happily married with her since he only wants to fulfill the dying wish of his father. Clifford is bitten by a forest creature, and this leads to the first conversation between them. Rebecca assists him in healing his wound. She also reveals to him that she was previously in love and expresses her disregard in his lack of respect and love for her. After some lengthy discussion between them, they began to get attracted to each other. Rebecca gets kidnapped by two men, this was later revealed to have been orchestrated by Rebecca and her former boyfriend. Rebecca returns to Clifford and explains her plans all along to fake her death and stop his driver from following by poisoning him. After listening and seeing the genuineness of her plea, Clifford accepts her while they both await the rescue team.
