= Things We Do for Love (TV series) =

TV series

- Genre: Teen drama
- Written by: Edward Seddor Jnr
- Directed by: Ivan Quashigah
- Starring: Adjetey Anang; Alice Schreyer; Sena Tsikata; David Bossman; Zimran Clottey; Vincent McCauley
- Country of origin: Ghana
- Original language: English

Production
- Producer: Ivan Quashigah
- Editor: Yaw Karkoh-Ampomah
- Running time: 30 mins

Original release
- Release: 2003

Things We Do for Love is a Ghanaian television series. It was telecast on GTV in 2003 to educate youth about sexuality.

== Plot ==
Things We Do for Love is about youths and their lives at school and home, with their parents getting in their way. Pusher (Adjetey Anang) is in a relationship with Dede but has other girlfriends. He is the cause of nearly all the trouble in the neighbourhood. His friend BB seeks ideas from Pusher to attract Marcia. However, Marcia's brother has romantic feelings for Dede. Shaker (Majid Michel) plays a Lebanese working in a hotel and a womanizer who could make a lady "melt" with his sweet words. His personality leads him into embarrassing incidents. His attempts to use those charms on Enyonam (Jackie Appiah) won't work either as she is in love with a calm guy in the neighbourhood, although they are both unable to live in this dreamland called Love, as she lives in fear of her Father.

== Episode 1 ==
Pusher teaches BB his walking style. Marcia almost runs into them runs to them to apologize, Pusher was furious with her because she was listening to music, BB tells Pusher that he should exercise patience but Pusher refuses. Marcia runs to her house. Pusher asks BB why he loves her.

Max is watching tv at high volume. Marcia runs home to inform her mother and brother about what had happened. Max becomes furious with the area boys because they don’t like him. He asks the sister about the car. Marcia says that she had to leave the key in the car. Max loses it and goes to pick up the car.

As they approach the car, Pusher sees that Marcia has left the key so he tells BB to have a look. BB tells Pusher that he is sending the car to the house. BB drives the car to meet the area boys under a tree and he tells them he is going to come and is praised by the area boys. He sends the car to Marcia and makes Marcia happy. Max goes to the spot where Marcia left the car, meets Pusher and angrily asks him what happened. Pusher angrily responds but does not reveal its location. Max goes home and finds the car parked there. Marcia tells him that BB brought the car.

BB returns to Pusher telling him that everything is sorted out between him and Marcia. Max complains about BB and all the area boys. Marcia tells Max why he is still furious about BB, but he just is given a chance. Max says if anything happens to her he is going to blame BB.

== Characters ==
- Pusher is a character called Clotey who obtained the nickname 'Pusher' when he was asked by his class teacher what he wanted to be in the future. He said he wanted to be a truck pusher, and so this is what his classmates called him. He lives with his grandfather and brother. It is inferred that his father lives abroad; there his mother is not mentioned. He is arrogant and likes to hang out with the neighbourhood boys who usually give the community problems. He is a womanizer.
- Dede is a teenage girl who has a lot of boys in her life. She is Pusher's girlfriend, but breaks up with him because of her relationship with Max.
- Marcia is a young lady who is now skeptical about relationships with guys as a result of losing her virginity to her former boyfriend, who coerced her into having sex. She is falling for BB.
- BB is best friends with Pusher. BB is articulate and decent but puts on a front to maintain his reputation as a neighbourhood tough guy like Pusher. His archenemy is Max, because Max stands in his way of falling in love with Marcia, Max's younger sister.
- Max is the older, overly protective brother of Marcia. He is in a relationship with Ofeibea but happens to be one of the many guys interested in Dede as well.
- Ofeibea is a beautiful young lady who is officially in a relationship with Max. She resists Max's attempts to get intimate. She is naive about sex but is bent on abstinence.
- Julia more often than not is usually with older, wealthier men. She is Pusher's girlfriend, but their relationship is uncertain because Pusher is using her.
- Aluta is close to Pusher and BB and is one of the neighbourhood area boys who likes to aggravate the community.
- AKiller is a drunk who disturbs the community a lot.
- Octopussy is a young man who is familiar with boys such as Pusher, BB and Aluta. His real name is Tsatsu. He believes in catching the ladies young keeping them forever. He does not believe in pursuing older ladies.
- High Priest is a young man who loves to rap.
- Cambodia is an old soldier who is usually depicted as aggravated by boys such as Pusher, Killer, BB, Aluta and Octopussy
- Lois who was known for her American accent, wasn't an easy-going character

== Cast ==
- Adjetey Anang as Pusher
- Jackie Appiah as Enyonam
- Majid Michel as Shaker
- Alice Schreyer as Dede
- Sena Tsikata as Marcia Mensah
- David Bossman as BB
- Zimran Clottey as Aluta
- Vincent McCauley as Max
- Abeiku Nana Acquah as AKiller
- Adjoa Pieterson
- Akwasi Boadi (Akrobeto) as Police Officer
- Nat Banini as Cambodia
- Marleen Hutchful as Lois
