= Albert Kuvodu =

Ghanaian actor and producer

- Other names: Daavi; Daavi Oo Daavi
- Citizenship: Ghanaian
- Occupations: Actor and producer
- Notable work: Fon Shop; Scent of Danger; Ama; Sun City; Thursday Theatre; Hard Times; DarkSand; That Day; London Get Problem; After the Promise

Albert Kuvodu also known as Daavi Oo Daavi or Daavi is a Ghanaian actor and producer.

== Filmography ==
List of films he has acted over the years.

- Fresh Trouble
- Fon Shop
- Scent of Danger
- Ama
- Sun City
- Thursday Theatre
- Hard Times
- Dark Sand
- That Day
- London Get Problem
- After the Promise

== Podcasts ==
In 2020, Kuvodu starred in the scripted comedy-fiction podcast DEM TIMES, voicing multiple roles including Mr Adjei, the father to the lead character Samuel Adjei.
