= Ekow Blankson =

Ghanaian managing director and actor (1972–2022)

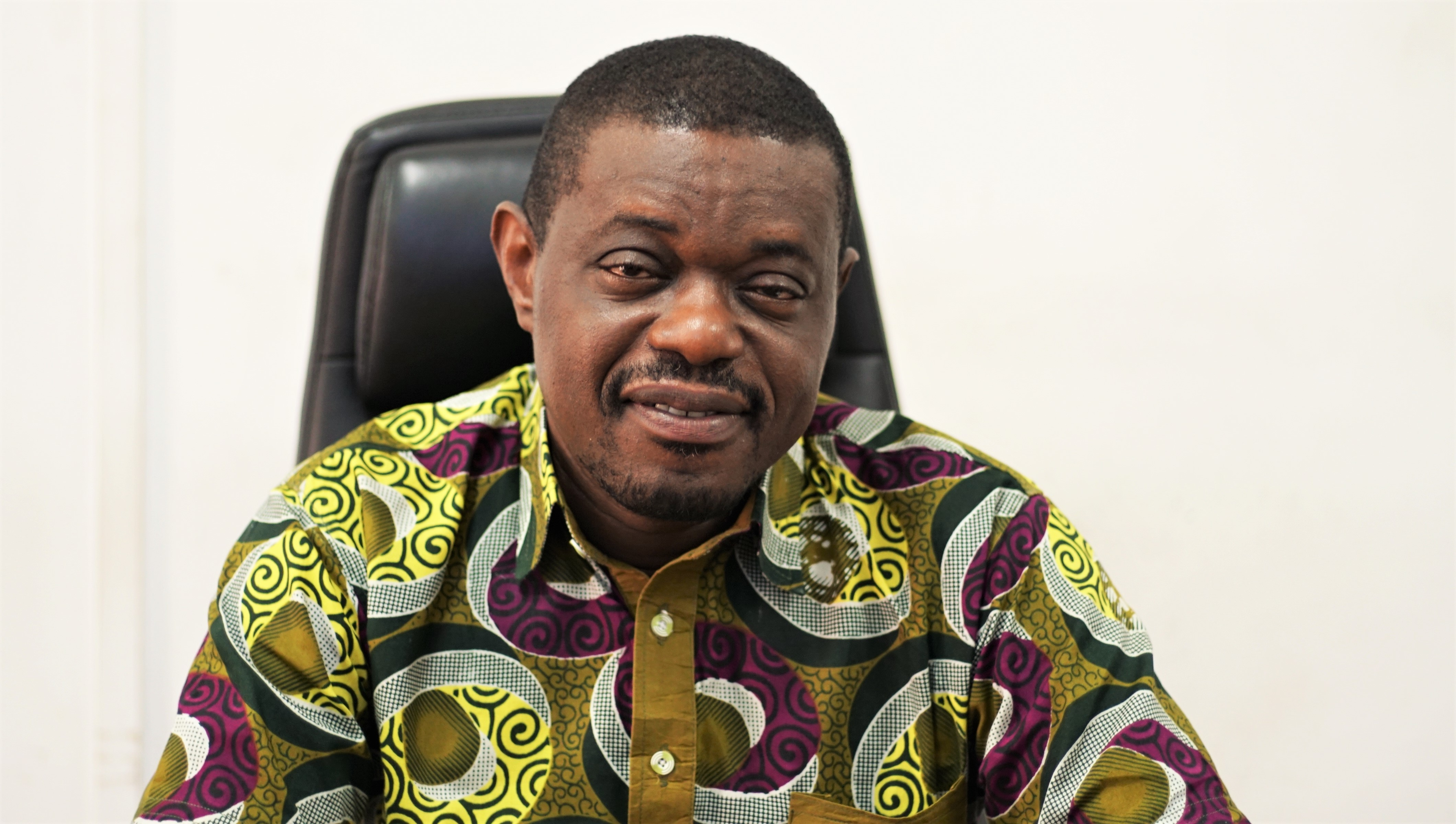
- Born: 16 March 1972
- Died: 3 October 2022 (aged 50)
- Education: University of Ghana, Heineken Global Commerce University
- Occupations: Actor, managing director
- Known for: Checkmate, In April, The saga, The pool party, Savannah
- Children: 3
- Awards: Great Excellence Movie Awards Golden Start award

Ekow Blankson (16 March 1972 – 3 October 2022) was a Ghanaian actor and the Commercial Manager of GhanaWeb. He also worked on projects for schools, notable among them was a production from Lords Production of GH Schools, he worked with them on a movie titled Breath Vengeance and was nominated Best Adult Male Role in their awards scheme, the GH Student's Movie Awards.

He died on 3 October 2022, at the age of 50 after a short illness.

== Education ==
Blankson held a Master's degree in Fine Arts and a Diploma in Theatre Arts (Drama) from the University of Ghana, Legon. He also had a marketing certificate from Heineken Global Commerce University, Amsterdam.

== Career ==
Ekow worked with media companies including TV Africa, Media General Ghana Limited and Multimedia Broadcasting Company as Managing Director, Director of Brands and Corporate Communications and General Manager (Luv FM and Nhyira FM) respectively. He featured in and directed some Ghanaian movies. Ekow Blankson, until his demise, worked at GhanaWeb as a Commercial Manager.

== Filmography ==
- Checkmate (2010) as Kiki Newton
- Borga (2021) as Chief
- In April (2016) as Prempeh
- Black Earth Rising (2018) as Tennis court bodyguard
- Death After Birth (2011)
- The Intruder
- Diary of the Black Hustler
- The Saga
- Total Exchange
- A Woman's Desire
- Frozen Emotion (2006)
- My Mother's Heart
- Check Mate
- Red Carpet (2022)
- The CEO
- The Pool Party (2011) as Dr. Donald
- Rhapsody of Love (2010) as Antwi
- The Secret burden (2012)
- Dying of the Light
- Breath Vengeance
- Savannah (2021)
- Famous (2021) as Mr. Essel
- Illusions (2021)
- A Woman's Scorn (2020)
- Accra Medic Series
- To Have and To Hold Series

== Awards ==
Golden start award awarded by Great Excellence Movie Awards.

== Nominations ==
- Best Actor nomination at the Africa Movie Academy Awards (AMAA).
- Best Supporting Actor nomination at the 2010 Ghana Movie Awards.
- Best Male Actor International nomination at the 2022 NELAS AWARDS UK
- Best Adult Male Role GH Student's Movie Awards 2022
