= Lydia Forson =

Ghanaian actress, writer, and producer

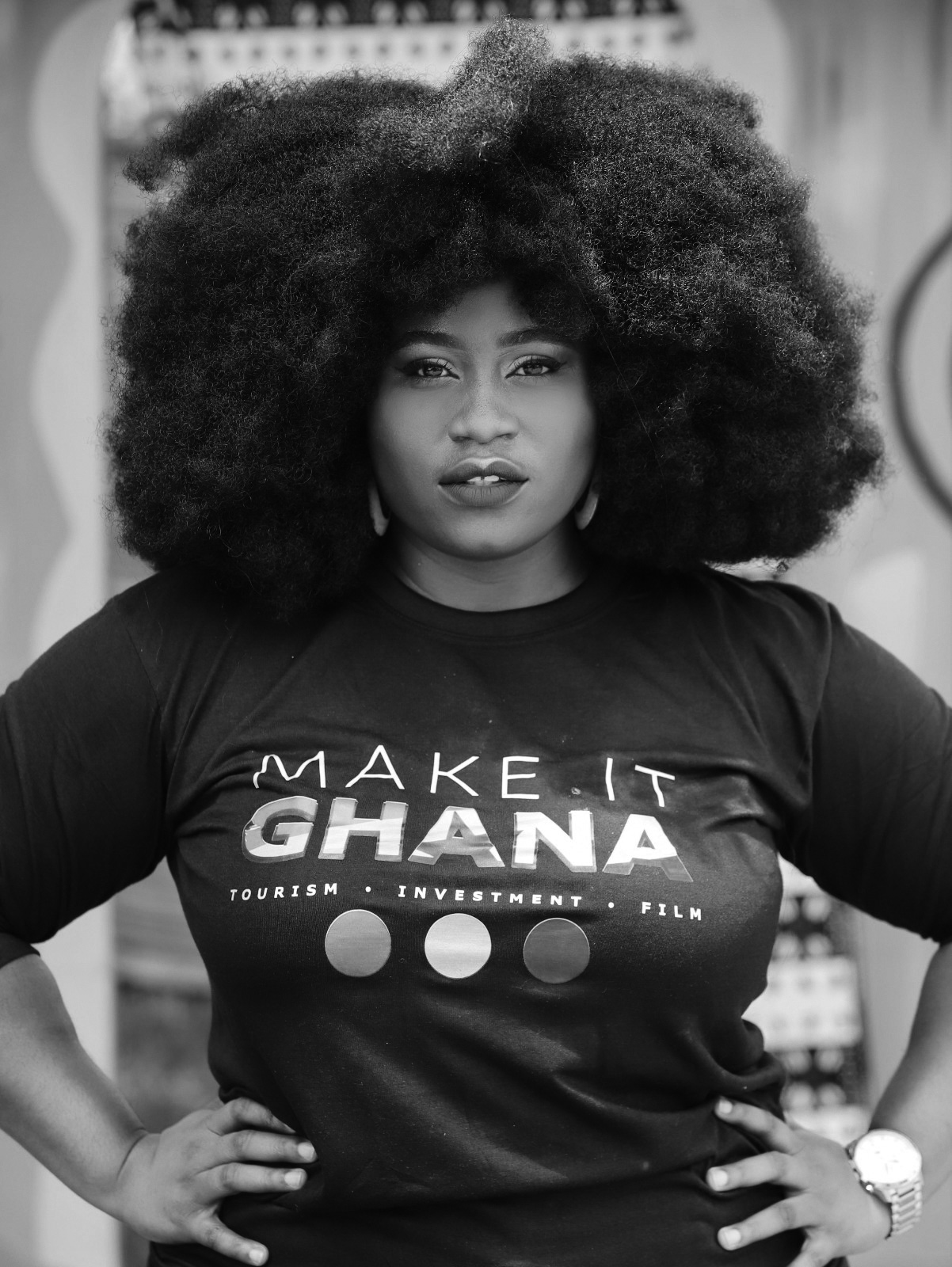
- Born: 24 October 1984 (age 41); Mankessim Ghana
- Education: University of Ghana
- Occupations: Actress, writer and producer
- Years active: 2005–present
- Notable work: Kamara's Tree, Phone Swap, A Sting in a Tale
- Awards: Africa Movie Academy Award; Ghana Movie Awards 2012; 2018 Africa Magic Viewers' Choice Awards; Entertainment Achievement Awards

Lydia Forson (born 24 October 1984) is a Ghanaian actress, writer, and producer. In 2010 she won the Africa Movie Academy Award for Best Actress in a Leading Role.

== Early life and education ==
Forson was born on 24 October 1984 in Mankessim, Ghana. She received her early education at Wilmore Elementary School in Kentucky. At the age of nine, her family moved back to Ghana, where she continued her education at Akosombo International School. She also attended St. Louis Secondary School, Kumasi, where she completed her secondary school education.

Forson graduated from the University of Ghana, earning a bachelor's degree in English Language and Information Studies.

== Career ==
Forson's acting career started with a cameo role in Hotel St. James (2005), Run Baby Run (2006), Different Shades of Blue (2007) and a stint in the reality show The Next Movie Star in Nigeria (2007). In 2008, Forson took on the lead role in Scorned, a drama helmed by Shirley Frimpong-Manso, CEO of Sparrow Productions, who had previously worked with Forson in the Ghanaian television series Different Shades of Blue. This starring role led to her first Africa Movie Academy Awards (AMAA) nomination as the Best Upcoming Female Actress.

In 2009, Forson starred in the award-winning The Perfect Picture by Frimpong-Manso in which she plays an abused wife who seeks revenge. Subsequent films include A Sting in a Tale (2009), Masquerades (2011) a comedy she also co-wrote, Phone Swap (2012), Keteke (2017), Sidechic Gang (2017) and For Love and Country (2025).

== Filmography ==
- Hotel St. James (2005) – Cameo roles
- Run Baby Run (2006) – Supporting role
- Different Shades of Blue (2007)
- The Next Movie Star Reality Show (2007) – Third runner-up
- Scorned (2008) – Lead role - as Dea Thompson
- The Perfect Picture (2009) – Supporting role - as Dede
- A Sting in a Tale (2009) – Lead role - as Frema
- Masquerades (2011) - as Nana Yaa Boateng
- Phone Swap (2012) - as Gina
- Kamara's Tree (2013) - as Lucy
- Scandal (2013) (South African series) – Aku
- A Letter From Adam (2014) – Writer/Producer
- Isoken (2017) as Kukua
- Keteke (2017) - Leading role - as Atswei
- Sidechic Gang (2018) - as Baaba
- The Perfect Picture: Ten Years Later (2019) as Dede
- Borga (2021) - as Mother
- For Love and Country (2025) - as Anima Grant

== Awards ==
Year	Award	Category	Result	Ref
2009	Africa Movie Academy Award	Best Actress in Supporting Role (Borga)	Nominated	
2010	Africa Movie Academy Award	Best Actress in a lead role	Won	
2012	Ghana Movie Awards	Best Screenplay (In The Cupboard)	Won	
2015	Golden Icons Academy Movie Awards	Best Comedic Act	Nominated	
2015	Africa Magic Viewers' Choice Awards	Best Actress in a Comedy	Nominated	
2015	Africa Magic Viewers' Choice Awards	Best Writer (Comedy)	Nominated	
2015	Nigeria Entertainment Awards	Actress of the Year (Africa)	Nominated	
2017	Africa Movie Academy Award	Best Actress in a lead role	Nominated	
2018	Africa Magic Viewers' Choice Awards	Best Supporting Actress	Won	
2020	People's Choice Awards		Nominated	
2022	Entertainment Achievement Awards	Female Actor of the Year	Won	
