= Irene Logan =

Liberian-Ghanaian singer (born 1984)

- Born: Irene Elizabeth Logan; February 16, 1984 (age 42); Monrovia, Liberia
- Origin: Accra, Ghana
- Genres: Gospel; R&B; pop
- Occupations: Singer; songwriter
- Years active: 2006–present
- Label: iLog Productions

Irene Logan (born February 16, 1984) is a Liberian-Ghanaian singer, songwriter, philanthropist, and entrepreneur. She and her family moved to Ghana in search of refuge during the First Liberian Civil War. Logan gained recognition after winning the first edition of Stars of the Future in 2006.

== Life and career ==
Irene Elizabeth Grace Logan was born on February 16, 1984, in Monrovia, to Tina Logan, a teacher and gospel singer, and Thomas Logan, an accountant and musician. Logan's father died from an undisclosed illness at the age of 25. She and her mother fled to Accra in search of refuge during the First Liberian Civil War. Logan studied literature, history, and music at Achimota School in 2003. While attending the school, she sang in the choir and was a member of the writers and debaters club. Logan studied marketing at Zenith University College, but left after her second year to pursue a career in music.

Logan won the first season of Stars of the Future in 2006, finishing ahead of Efya. Following the show's conclusion, both women formed the music duo Irene & Jane. The duo released their 2007 collaborative album Unveiled, and were nominated for an award at the 2008 Channel O Music Video Awards. Unveiled included the songs "Baby" and "Heated Up". Logan won Best Female Vocalist at the 2007 Ghana Music Awards and was nominated for a Kora Award in 2008. Her debut single, "Runaway", became a hit in Ghana. Her follow-up single, "Kabila", also gained recognition. She recorded the song "My Mind Dey", which was used as the soundtrack for the film series Adams Apples. Logan has performed with several artists, including Hugh Masakela, Lagbaja, Jay Z, and Beenie Man. In recent years, she made a transition to gospel music.

== Business and philanthropy ==
Logan is the CEO and creative director of Tribassa Limited, an African-inspired luxury lifestyle brand. She is passionate about giving back to society, and has volunteered her time to several humanitarian causes. She started the "I am the Future" initiative and partnered with the Office of the United Nations High Commissioner for Refugees (UNHCR) to inspire and assist young men and women in discovering ways to positively impact their communities.

== Personal life ==
Logan married her partner on 19 April 2024.

== Previous affiliations ==
- MTN Ambassador 2006
- Globacom Limited (Glo) Ambassador 2009
- UNHCR Ambassador 2010

== Notable performances ==
- Opening act for Beenie Man at Accra International Conference Centre in 2005
- Channel O Music Video Awards 2006
- Opened performance for American Hip Hop star Jay Z at Accra International Conference Centre in 2006
- Performed at Big Brother Africa show in 2008
- Kora Awards 2007
- Ghana Music Awards 2008
- My Mind Dey song featured in Ghanaian popular Soap Opera Adams Apples
- Performed at Ghana Radio and Television Personality Awards in 2012
- Guest Performance at Glo xfactor in 2013
- Performed Andy Williams’ ‘The Impossible Dream’ at the funeral of the late former president, Jerry John Rawlings (2021)
- Performed the "Star Spangled Banner" representing Ghana in celebration of the 4th of July Independence Day (2021)
- Performed at the GUBA 2021 awards held in Ghana

== Discography ==
Collaborative albums

- Unveiled (with Efya) (2007)

Singles

- "Kabila" (2009)
- "Runaway" (featuring Asem) (2009)
- "My Mind Dey" (2011)
- "Emperor" (2011)
- "Akwasi Casanova" (2013)
- "In Love with a Devil" (2014)
- "Na Me Dey There" (2014)
- "SA" (2014)
- "Stay" (cover) (2014)
- "Medowo" (2015)
- "Conga" (featuring Wiyaala) (2016)
- "More" (2022)

Guest appearances

- "Ghetto Love" by Stonebwoy (featuring Irene Logan)
- "Mr. Versatile" by Okyeame Kwame (featuring Irene Logan)
- "Power to Win" (with M.I, Flavour and Kwabena Kwabena)
- "Runaway" by Asem (featuring Irene Logan)
- "1000 Fights and Make Up" by Asem (featuring Irene Logan)
- "Na Me Dey There" by Asem (featuring Irene Logan)
- "Light and Darkness" by Trigmatic (featuring Irene Logan)
- "Satisfy" by Eric Jeshrun (featuring Irene Logan)

== Filmography ==
- Adams Apples (2012)
- Fix Us (2019) as Ama

== Awards and nominations ==
Year	Award	Presented	Nominated work	Result
2006	Channel O Music Video Awards	Herself	"Heated Up"	Nominated
2007	Ghana Music Awards	Herself	Vocalist of the Year	Won
2007	Kora Awards	Herself	Discovery of the Year	Nominated
2015	4Syte Music Video Awards	Herself	"My Mind Dey"	Nominated
2017	3G Awards Award	Herself	Global Humanitarian	Won
2020	Ghana Movie Awards	Herself	Discovery	Won

== See also ==
- List of Liberian musicians
