= Choirmaster (musician) =

Ghanaian musician (born 1982)

- Born: Eugene Baah; 26 July 1982 (age 44); Accra, Ghana
- Genres: hip life / Afropop
- Years active: 2000–present
- Label: Blueroze Entertainment
- Spouse: Beverly Afaglo

Eugene Baah, better known by his stage name Choirmaster (born 26 July 1982) is a Ghanaian hip life/afropop singer-songwriter, record producer and entrepreneur. He became widely known as the leader of the defunct hiplife group Praye before going solo. He has earned numerous awards and additional nominations.

== Career ==
He joined forces with two other acts, Steven Fiawoo (Praye Tietia) and Nana Kwame (Praye Tenten) to form the music trio, Praye. Their first taste of success came when they won the maiden edition of the Nescafe African Revelation. The group went on to win some prominent awards including the Best Group in West Africa at the Kora Awards in 2005. But the family of Praye died when after ten years, the group split to pursue solo interests and that split birthed a new artiste, Choirmaster.

His debut song, "Ghana's Most Beautiful", became the theme song of a popular beauty pageant show, TV3 Ghana's Most Beautiful, which gave him the recognition he needed to rebrand his career as a solo artiste. Some of his known songs are "Pull Him Down" which was nominated for Best Hiplife Video of the Year during THE 2014 4Syte Music Video Awards, "Obsession", "Last Born" ft Black Rasta.

== Personal life ==
Choirmaster was married to Ghanaian actress Beverly Afaglo who passed away on the 24th of May, 2026.
