= The Game (2010 film) =

- Release Poster
- Directed by: Frank Rajah Arase
- Written by: Frank Rajah Arase
- Produced by: Abdul Salam Mumuni
- Starring: Majid Michel; Yvonne Okoro; Yvonne Nelson; John Dumelo
- Distributed by: Heroes Productions
- Release date: 2010
- Country: Ghana
- Language: English

The Game is a 2010 Ghanaian-Nigerian thriller film directed by Frank Rajah Arase, starring;Majid Michel, Yvonne Okoro and Yvonne Nelson.

== Cast ==
- Majid Michel as Teddy Elbert
- John Dumelo as Ronnie Lawson
- Yvonne Okoro as Brandy
- Yvonne Nelson as Shennel Johnson
- Beverly Afaglo as Detective
- Akosua Agyepong as Conny Osei
- Nadia Archer Kang as Jackie Oppong
- Johannes Maier as Bill Elbert
- Lion De Angelo as Fred
- Fred Nuamah as Jake Freeman
- Ebi Bright as Letoya Benson
- Bernice Amponsah as Matron
- Albert Bonney Awere as Mike

== Reception ==
It got a 3 out of 5 star rating from Nollywood Reinvented who questioned the originality of the storyline, as the film seems copied from two 2008 Bollywood films; Race and Ghajini. Nollywood Forever gave it a 58% rating. While the reviewer found the cinematography to be of high quality, he found the plot too convoluted and confusing.
