= Sena Tsikata =

Ghanaian actress

Sena Tsikata is a Ghanaian actress best known for playing Marcia in the 2003 teen drama Things We Do for Love.

== Early life and education ==
Sena Tsikata is from Srogboe in the Volta Region of Ghana, and has six siblings. She holds a B.A. in Psychology with minor in political science from the University of Delaware, having graduated in 2006.

== Career ==
Tsikata began acting in television and radio commercials. She also worked as a model in Accra.

She was a script consultant for the series Fortune Island.
