= Sakawa =

Ghanaian phenomenon

Sakawa is a Ghanaian term for illegal practices which combine modern Internet-based fraud with African traditionalist rituals. The term or word Sakawa is an Hausa word which means putting inside, how to make money. The rituals, which are mostly in the form of sacrifices, are intended to spiritually manipulate victims so that the scammer's fraud is successful. The term Sakawa referred to specific online scams but has since broadened to include all types of online frauds and scams mainly targeting foreigners. The scammers flaunt stylish clothes, luxury cars, and enormous wealth, in order to promote this act. In impoverished areas, it can be seen as a way of survival for some.

Scammers involved in this practice call themselves Sakawa boys. A culture has developed around Sakawa which has influenced music and clothing brands. Movies depicting the lifestyle have become popular, a movement led by Ghanaian filmmaker Socrate Safo.

== See also ==
- Crime in Ghana
- Nigerian scam
