= The Perfect Picture: Ten Years Later =

2019 Ghanaian film

The Perfect Picture: 10 Years Later
- Film poster
- Directed by: Shirley Frimpong-Manso
- Screenplay by: Shirley Frimpong-Manso
- Produced by: Shirley Frimpong-Manso and Ken Attoh
- Production company: Sparrow Productions (Sparrow Pictures)
- Release date: December 1, 2019
- Running time: 150 minutes
- Country: Ghana
- Language: English

The Perfect Picture: 10 Years Later is a 2019 Ghanaian film produced and directed by Shirley Frimpong-Manso and Ken Attoh. It is a sequel to The Perfect Picture, also produced and written by Shirley Frimpong-Manso. At the 2020 Africa Magic Viewers' Choice Awards, Gloria Sarfo won the Best Supporting Actress in a Movie or TV Series for her role in the film.

== Synopsis ==
The original film was about three women pushing their thirties and making bold attempts to change their lives, but destiny had other plans for them. In the sequel, the ladies are back, this time pushing their forties. Even though they are older and wiser, they realise that now they are saddled with more issues including their not so fairy-tale relationships.

== Cast ==
- Lydia Forson as Dede
- Jackie Appiah as Aseye
- Naa Ashorkor Mensah-Doku as Akasi
- Chris Attoh as Larry
- Joselyn Dumas as Flora
- Adjetey Anang as Fella
- John Dumelo as Taylor
- Kwaku Sintim-Misa as Doctor Biney
- Richard Mofe-Damijo as Sam
- Beverly Naya as Samantha
- Anita Erskine as Angela
- Gideon Okeke as Yobanna
- Gloria Sarfo as Susanna
- Raphael Boakye as Nigel
