= Akwaaba =

2019 Ghanaian film dir. Kobi Rana

- Directed by: Cornelius Phanthomas
- Written by: Cornelius Phanthomas
- Release date: 2019
- Country: Ghana

Akwaaba is a 2019 Ghanaian movie written and directed by Cornelius Phanthomas, also known as Kobi Rana.

== Plot ==
- Bishop Nyarko
- Gloria Osei Sarfo
- Efia Odo
- Moesha Boduong
- Baby Blanche
- Afi Kpodo
