= Afima Kpodo =

Ghanaian actress (born 1987)

Afima Adzo Kpodo
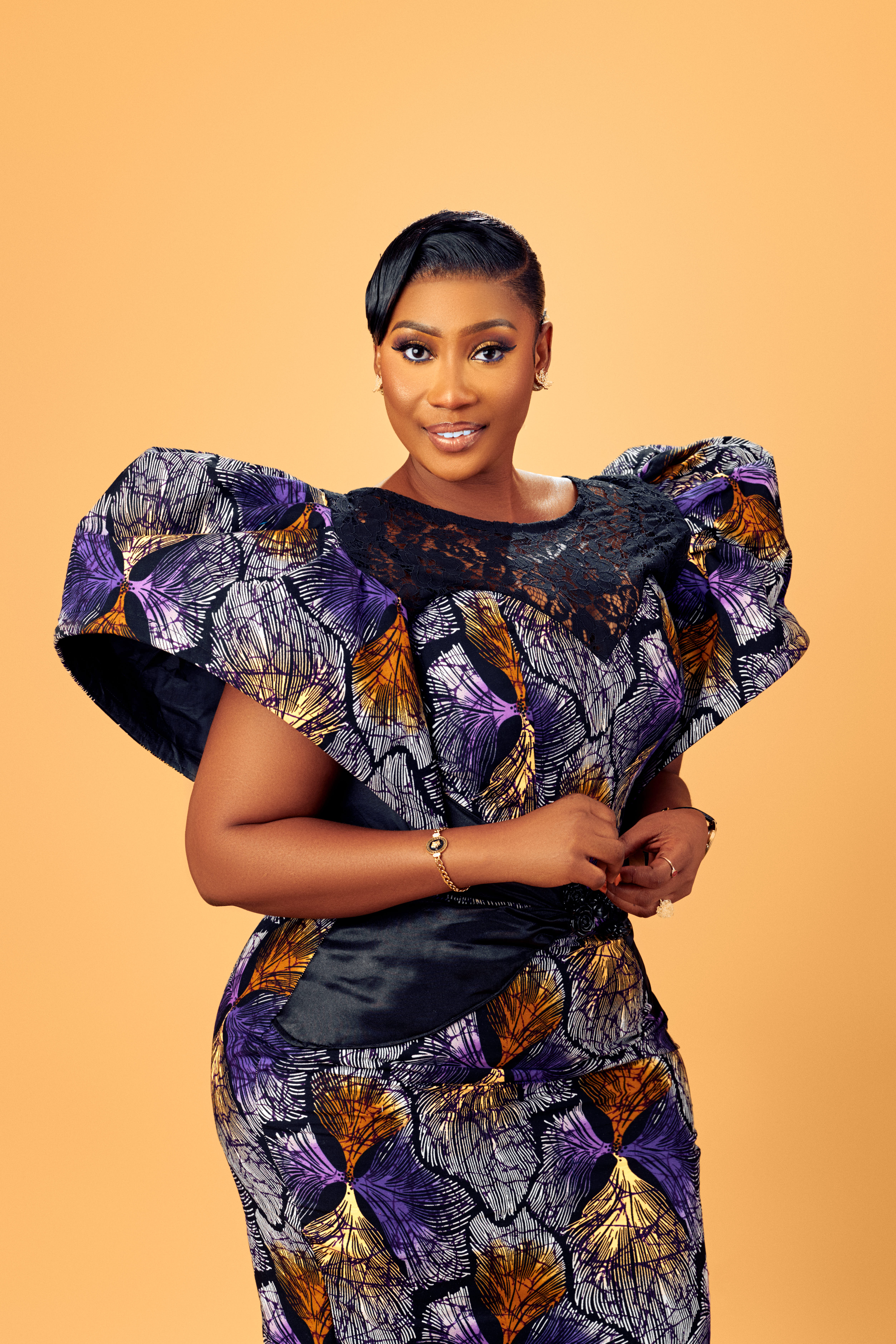
- Afima Kpodo, Ghanaian Actress
- Born: 27 March 1987 (age 39); Volta Region, Ghana
- Education: OLA Girls Senior High School (Ho)
- Occupations: Actress, model, Entrepreneur
- Notable work: Akwaaba
- Awards: GOWA Ghana Outstanding Woman Actress
- Website: afima socials

Afima Adzo Kpodo (born 27 March 1987), also known as MAMAGA1, is a Ghanaian actress, model and an entrepreneur. In 2019, she starred in Kobi Rana's Akwaaba.

== Biography ==
Afima was born and raised in Accra. She attended OLA Girls Senior High School (Ho) in 2006 and then transitioned to IPMC to study web design after senior high school. She won the GOWA Best Woman Actress at the Alisa hotel and went ahead to star and host several movies and shows respectively.

== Career ==
Afima starred as "Norah" in Secret Desires season 1/2 by 2020 Africa Magic Viewers' Choice Awards nominee and Celebrity Marriage producer, Uchenna Mbunabo, a role that earned her an "outstanding women awards nomination". She also starred in the award-winning movie, Drops of Happiness.

She also won the best actress at the Ghana Entertainment Awards, USA in 2021, the best supporting actress at the "SDTA AWARDS" in 2023. She has gone further to clinch unto several awards, including the African Youth Showbiz Awards 2022. Afima has also hosted several television shows including Hottest Spots TV on Ghana Broadcasting Corporation, GTV. Mamaga is also a strong advocate of good ethics in the film industry.

== Filmography ==
Film	Year	Character
The Maid	2025	Serwaa Akoto
This Thing Called Love	2024	Afima
Gangster Love	2024	Rosey
Kpakpakpa Tv Series	2024	Ronica
DNA	2024	Grace
Tears of drop	2024	Armed Robber
Beautiful revenge	2024	Jessy
East legon girls (beyond the velvet Rope)	2024	Lena
Car Owner	2023	Madam Afima
Drops of Happiness	2022	Salon Owner
Secret Desires	2021	Norah
Funny Love	2021	NA
Akwaaba	2019	N/A
Breached	2018	Clarinda
Girls game	2017	Jenny
Stalemates	2016	N/A
Twisted tips	2016	N/A

== Awards and nominations ==
Year	Award	Category	Work	Result
2018	GOWA Awards	Young Woman Actress	—N/a	Won
2021	Ghana Entertainment Awards, USA	Best Actress	—N/a	Won
2021	SDTA Awards	Actress of the Year	—N/a	Won
2022	African Youth Showbiz Awards			Won
2022	Africa CEOs and Entrepreneurs Award	Celebrated Food Entrepreneur of the Year	Celebrity Pub and Kitchen	Won
2023	SDTA Awards	Best Supporting Actress		Won
2025	GMAEA	Best Actress		Won
