= Socrate Safo =

Ghanaian director

- Citizenship: Ghanaian
- Occupations: Director, filmmaker
- Years active: 1992–present
- Notable work: Ghost Tears

Socrate Safo is a Ghanaian director, filmmaker, and Director for Creative Arts at the National Commission on Culture (NCC) in Ghana. He is a prominent figure in Ghallywood and head of Move Africa Productions.

== Career ==
Safo began his filmmaking career while working as a janitor in a movie theater. He was initially training to be an auto mechanic. It was during this time he filmed his 1992 movie Ghost Tears, which became a commercial success. The movie helped pioneer the Ghanaian ghost film genre.

Safo was the public relations officer of the Film Producers Association of Ghana. He featured prominently in the 2011 VICE documentary The Sakawa Boys, which spoke about Safo's influence on the Sakawa movement in Ghana. Safo claims to have made more than 100 movies between 1988 and the filming of the documentary. In 2015, he closed down his Movie Africa Studio because of dumsor.

In June 2017, Safo was appointed as Director for Creative Arts at the NCC. Previously, he had been working as an executive secretary at the NCC.

In May 2020, Safo was appointed by Barbara Oteng Gyasi, the Minister of Tourism, Culture, and Creative Arts, as Chairman of the Film Classification Committee, a committee formed under the Ghana National Film Authority. The goal of the committee is to regulate and promote the Ghanaian film industry. In 2021, he announced his retirement from filmmaking.

== Personal life ==
Safo is married to his wife, Mercy. He has three sons and a daughter. He is a member of the New Patriotic Party.

== Filmography ==
1. Ghost Tears (Role: Director, Year: 1992)
2. Unconditional Love (Role: Director, Year: 1986)
3. Unconditional Love 2 (Role: Director)
4. Ba Bone the Phobia Girl (Role: Director)
5. Lover's Blues (Role: Director)
6. Step Dad (Role: Director)
7. Waterproof (Role: Director)
8. Sakawa Boys (Role: Director)
9. Women in Love (Role: Director, Year: 1996)
10. Satan's Wife (Role: Director)
11. God is Wicked (Role: Director)
12. Amen (Role: Director)
13. Sub-City (Role: Director)

== Awards and nominations ==
Year	Organisation	Award	Work	Result
2010	Ghana Movie Awards	Best Directing - English	Adults Only	Nominated
