= Zimran Clottey =

Ghanaian actor

- Other name: Aluta
- Education: Achimota School
- Occupations: actor, film director, writer
- Known for: Things We Do for Love
- Children: 7

Zimran Clottey is a Ghanaian actor, writer, musician, film director and a teacher, popularly known as "Aluta" which was his name in the TV series Things We Do for Love. He is married with seven children; two are twins. He started acting at the age of six in Children's Own, a TT programme on Ghana Broadcasting Corporation (GBC) hosted by the late Tina Moses in the 1980s.

He was a member of the drama club in Achimota School. He is a Ga from Ga Mashie. He was the host of Pop Box, a TV programme on Ghana Television.

== Education ==
He went to Christ The King International School then proceeded to Achimota School.

== Filmography ==
- Things we do for love (2003-2016 TV Series) as Aluta
- The Mighty One (2007) as Batuka
- Dr Love (2012) as Yeboah
- Tanko Villa (2022 TV Series) as Man 1
- Number 10 Kotokraba Close
- The house party
- Akushika
- The Oil City
