= Alexandra Amon =

French-Ivorian actress, screenwriter and film producer

Alexandra Amon, born 27 July 1981 in Neuilly-sur-Seine, France is an actress, scriptwriter, producer, entrepreneur and philanthropist.

== Biography ==
Of Ivorian heritage, she studied in the United States before returning to Côte d'Ivoire to found her production company and to rejoin her family.

In 2006, she obtained a bachelor's degree in advertising from the Pratt Institute.

She did an internship for the famous American photographer and director David LaChapelle. Afterwards, she worked with various independent production companies in the United States and also did a stint with 3A Télésud.

Around 2008, after having finished her studies and having completed internships in various production companies and for various television networks in the United States, she left New York City and moved to Abidjan.

In 2012, after two years as artistic director of the Agence McCann in Abidjan, Amon founded her own production company, ZIV. Five years later, in 2017, she was a winner at the Fespaco. Her career has focused on several French-language productions to be broadcast in Europe, in Africa and on international television stations such as Canal+, BET France, and TV5 Monde.

== List of various works ==
=== Film ===
- Fix Us (2019)

=== Television ===
November 2014 : Chroniques africaines. Broadcast on, A+, TV5, BET, produced by ZIV Productions.

This was the first semi-fictional Reality television series from the Ivory Coast that details many small stories inspired by the daily lives of the inhabitants of a large city. It combined elements from both fiction and reality television. The first city featured is Abidjan. Each story featured in the series relates a piece of everyday life in an African city and revolves around the themes of love and of male-female relations.

February 2017 : Boutique hôtel. Broadcast on A+, TV5 and YouTube; a ZIV Productions et RED TV production.

Boutique hôtel features a young woman named Lola Durant, who, following in her mother's footsteps, takes over a hotel residence. As a novice, she will be faced with an extraordinary staff and a rather atypical clientele. As the series progresses, stories of love and low blows are intertwined. The series consists of eight fifteen-minute episodes, originally made for the World Wide Web. The series premiered at the official launch of the francophone version of Red TV Afrique.

== Awards ==
- 2015 : Winner of best TV series for "Chroniques Africaines " – Panafrican Film and Television Festival.
- 2017 : 100 Most Influential Africans of 2017.
