= Checkmate (2010 film) =

Ghanaian movie

- Directed by: Shirley Frimpong Manso
- Written by: Shirley Frimpong Manso
- Produced by: Ken Attoh
- Starring: Ewurama Asante; Senanu Gbedawo; Nadia Buari
- Release date: 2010
- Country: Ghana

Checkmate is a Ghanaian crime drama film that was written and directed by Shirley Frimpong Manso for Sparrow Productions. It was produced by Ken Attoh, features stars like Nadia Buari, Ekow Blankson, Naa Ashorkor Mensah Doku and introduced Senanu Gbedawo. It was released in 2010.

== Cast ==
- Nadia Buari – Caroline
- Ekow Blankson – Kiki Nelson
- Senanu Gbedawo – Kwame Asante
- Naa Ashorkor Mensah Doku – Naana Asante
- Elsie Kwansah – Ewurama Asante
- Kweku Boateng – Fiifi
- Khareema Agular – Jessica
- Jonas Odoi – Kiki's Driver
- Veeda Darko – Kiki's Sister
- Kwaku Sintim-Misa – Mr Tamakloe

== Plot ==
Kwame, played by Senanu Gbedawo, is a member of the immigration workforce who has political ambitions. He comes into contact with Kiki played by Ekow Blankson, who is a drug kingpin. Kiki initially presents himself as a real estate developer and introduces Kwame to Caroline, who is played by Nadia Buari. Kwame feels an instant attraction to her and notwithstanding his status as a family man, makes moves and quickly gets her into bed. He ends the relationship when Caroline gets a bit obsessed but she is not ready to put the relationship behind her and threatens to inform his wife and go public with the news of their affair. Kwame's new friends are part of a scheme to move drugs out of the country. The drugs would go through customs smoothly with Kwame involved and to make sure of this, Kiki employs the affair tactic to corner him. Kwame now has to deal with the dilemma of giving in to Kiki's demands or losing his family and political aspirations.
