= Richmond Xavier Amoakoh =

Ghanaian actor and writer

- Born: 19 June 1987 (age 39); Mampong, Ashanti Region
- Other name: Lawyer Nti
- Citizenship: Ghanaian
- Education: University of Ghana
- Occupations: Comedy actor, writer and Director.
- Years active: 2007-till present
- Television: Kejetia vs Makola
- Awards: 2018 Ghana Movie Awards

Richmond Xavier Amoakoh (born 19 June 1987) is a Ghanaian comedy actor, writer and director. He is popularly known as Lawyer Nti, the name of a fictional character he plays in the hit TV series Kejetia vs Makola.

== Education ==
Amoakoh was born on 19 June 1987 in Mampong, Ashanti Region. He is a product of the University of Ghana's School of Performing Arts.

== Career ==
He began his acting career in 2007 starring in stage plays including Nyansapo's Gallery of Comedy. Starring in the hit TV series Kejetia vs Makola as Layer Nti led to his breakthrough in the Ghanaian movie industry.

== Awards ==
- Person of the Year - 2017 Nogokpo Awards
- Lead Actor in a Comedy Series - 2018 Ghana Movie Awards
- Discovery of the Year - 2018 Ghana Movie Awards
