= Ivan Quashigah =

Ghanaian filmmaker

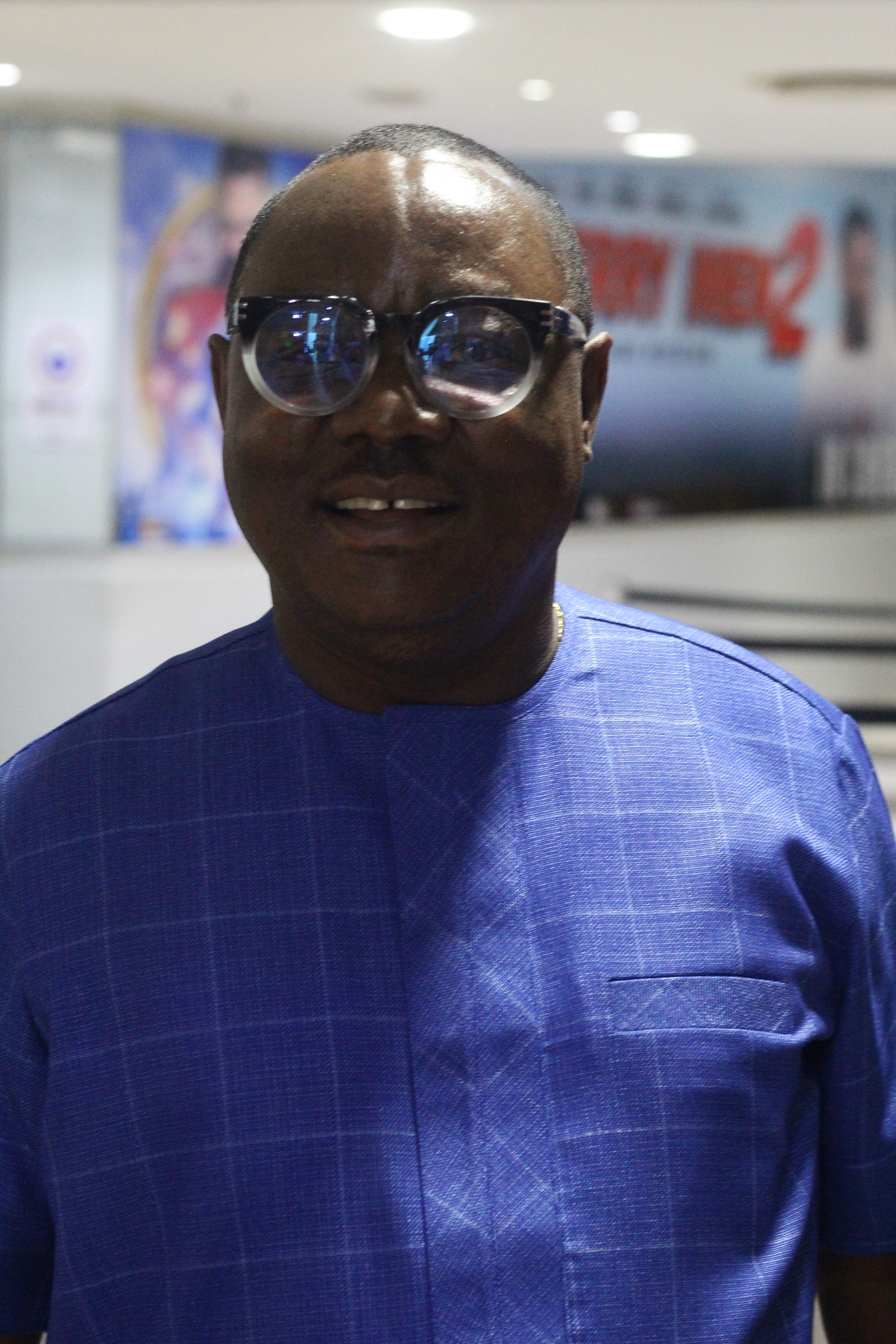
- Quashigah at Farmhouse Productions
- Born: Ivan Kwakuvi Quashigah; December 28, 1966 (age 59); Keta, Ghana
- Occupations: Film director, film producer, television director, television producer, music video director
- Years active: 1996–present
- Spouse: Catherine Quashigah
- Children: 3

Ivan Quashigah is a Ghanaian film maker, a creative director and the founder and C.E.O of Farmhouse Productions. He is well known for producing and directing the award-winning television series Things We Do for Love and recently Yolo. He also directed the DStv/Showmax spin-off of the popular '90s Ghanaian series, Inspector Bediako.

== Early life ==
Ivan was born in Keta in the south-eastern part of Ghana on December 28, 1966. He studied film directing and scriptwriting at the National Film and Television Institute (NAFTI) in Ghana. He also has an Executive master's degree in Governance and Leadership and Masters degree in Development Communication (Distinction) from the GIMPA Graduate School in Ghana.

== Career ==
In 2006, Ivan established his production company Farmhouse Productions, a company that works in film, television and events.

Ivan's work in film has won him both local and international awards.

His current TV Series, YOLO – ‘You Only Live Once’ which won seven out of eight awards at the Ghana Movie Awards 2016 is produced for the National Population Council and its partners under the Ghana Adolescent Reproductive Health Programme – GHARP funded by the UKAID and USAID and facilitated by the FHI360 and the Palladium Group.

In 2025, he was appointed chairman of the National Film Authority Board, placing him at the top of Ghana’s film industry. Ivan is celebrated as one of Ghana’s most creative minds, having earned more than eighteen international and local accolades, including the FESPACO award for Best Short Film.
