= Omar Sheriff Captan =

Ghanaian actor and entertainer

- Born: Ghana
- Occupations: Pastor, actor, film producer
- Known for: Outrage, Dark Sands, My sweetie, Tentacles, Tinsel, Cheaters
- Children: 1

Omar Sheriff Captan is a Ghanaian actor and film director. Although initially known for "bad boy" roles, he later became a pastor.

== Personal life ==
Captan married his long-time girlfriend Cindy in 2013, but later divorced, after which he became a pastor. He was reported to have a Tanzanian girlfriend in 2021. He has a daughter, Grace Smith, who is also an actress.

== Filmography ==
- Outrage
- Dark Sands (1999) - Vanking
- My Sweetie (1994) - Sweety's Boyfriend
- My Darling Princess (2008) - B.J.
- Innocent Soul (2007)
- Alicia (2006) - Alex
- The Chosen One (2003) - Daniel
- July (2016)
- 4 Play (2010) - Jayke
- Cheaters (2013)
- My Heart (2003) - Owusu
- Crime of Love
