= Michelle Attoh =

Ghanaian actress & TV personality

- Born: Michelle Attoh
- Education: Unknown
- Occupations: Actress, Television Presenter
- Known for: Acting, Hosting of TV Shows
- Parent: Rama Brew

Michelle Attoh is a Ghanaian actress, television presenter and the C.E.O. of Marketing and Events company. She was born in Ghana to veteran Ghanaian actress, Rama Brew.

== Career ==
Michelle is the host of Today's Woman on TV3. Some of the other roles she has taken up in her career are listed below.

Year	Title	Role	Notes
2022	La Maison Chiq	Naa	TV Series
2021	Us in Between		Directed by Shirley Frimpong-Manso
2019	Fix Us	Wendy	Directed by Pascal Amanfo
1990-2000	Ultimate Paradise	Actress	
N/A	Home with Michelle Attoh	Host	
2018	40 and Single	Young Patricia	TV Series 1 episode
2018	Bad Luck Joe	Francesca Patapaa	Directed y Ramesh Jai
