= A Sting in a Tale =

2009 film directed by Shirley Frimpong-Manso

A Sting In A Tale
- Poster
- Directed by: Shirley Frimpong Manso
- Written by: Shirley Manso
- Starring: Adjetey Anang; Lydia Forson; Majid Michel; Joselyn Dumas
- Cinematography: Bob J John Passah
- Edited by: Nana Akua Manso
- Music by: Sefa Bonsu
- Production company: Sparrow Productions
- Distributed by: African Movies & Music World
- Release date: November 6, 2009
- Running time: 115 minutes
- Country: Ghana
- Language: English

A Sting in a Tale is a 2009 Ghanaian thriller film written and directed by Shirley Frimpong-Manso and produced by Ken Attoh. The film won five awards at the Ghana Movie Awards in 2010, including the awards for Best Director, Best Writing — Adapted or Original Screen Play, Best Cinematography and Best Original Song.

== Premise ==
The movie follows the story of two unemployed graduates who embark on a journey to make it in a world where you need more than what you have to get what you want.

== Cast ==
- Adjetey Anang as Kuuku
- Lydia Forson as Frema
- Majid Michel as Nii Aryee
- Joselyn Dumas as Esi
- Yvette Owusu as Shirley's Secretary
- Doris Sakitey as Tamara
- Abeiku Acquah as Rocker Fella
- Christabel Ansong as Club Girl

== Reviews ==
It received a 4/5 rating from talkafricanmovies, who recommended the film and concluded that "the movie is a mixed bag of success, death, and ghosts and there is a certain African authenticity about it". It also got favourable review from Ghanacelebrities.
