= Adams Apples =

Ghanaian film

- Theatrical release poster for chapter 1
- Directed by: Shirley Frimpong-Manso
- Written by: Hetty Owusu
- Produced by: Ken Attoh
- Starring: Yvonne Okoro; Joselyn Dumas; John Dumelo; Naa Ashorkor Mensa-Doku; Anima Misa Amoah; Adjetey Anang; Helene Asante; SoulKnight Jazz; Jasmine Baroudi; Vincent McCauley; Roselyn Ngissah; Fred Kanebi
- Cinematography: Ken Attoh; Sadiq Al-Hassan; John Passah
- Edited by: Nana Akua Manso
- Music by: Elorm Adablah; Ivan Ayitey
- Production company: Sparrow Productions
- Release date: 21 April 2011; – 25 May 2012
- Running time: ~1080 minutes
- Country: Ghana
- Language: English

Adams Apples is a Ghanaian film series, starring Yvonne Okoro, Joselyn Dumas, John Dumelo, Naa Ashorkor Mensa-Doku, Anima Misa Amoah, Adjetey Anang, Helene Asante, SoulKnight Jazz, Jasmine Baroudi, Vincent McCauley, Roselyn Ngissah, Fred Kanebi. The series consists of ten drama feature films, known as "chapters", produced by Ken Attoh and directed by Shirley Frimpong-Manso.

The film series follows the life of the Adams' family, which is made up of Doris Adams (Anima Misa Amoah), a widow of an ex-diplomat, and her three daughters; Baaba (Okoro), Jennifer (Dumas) and Kuukua (Mensah-Doku), showing how they deal with their complicated family, love lives, individual secrets, lies and regrets. A spin-off television drama series, with the same title premiered in February 2013, and has since started airing on DStv's Africa Magic; the television series is set a year after the tenth chapter of the film series.

== Cast ==
- Anima Misa Amoah as Doris Adams
- Yvonne Okoro as Baaba Adams Smith
- Joselyn Dumas as Jennifer Adams
- Naa Ashorkor Mensah-Doku as Kuukua Adams
- Adjetey Anang as Albert Amankwah (or Albert Adams)
- Helene Asante as Ivy Amankwah (or Ivy Adams)
- SoulKnight Jazz as Chris Smith
- John Dumelo as Denu McCarby
- Jasmine Baroudi as Michelle
- Vincent McCauley as Foo
- Fred Kanebi as Gerald
- Roselyn Ngissah as Linda
- Fiifi Coleman as Chidi
- Sesanu Gbadebo as Eric

== Chapters ==
Adams Apples film series has constantly been praised for its predominant use of traditional prints costume.

Most chapters in the series were released at a month's interval, and the entire film series screened at a span of over ten months.

- Adams Apples: The Family Ties (2011)
- Adams Apples: Twisted Connections (2011)
- Adams Apples: Musical Chairs (2011)
- Adams Apples: Torn (2011)
- Adams Apples: Duplicity (2011)
- Adams Apples: Showdown (2011)
- Adams Apples: Confessions (2011)
- Adams Apples: Fight or Flight (2012)
- Adams Apples: Rescue Mission (2012)
- Adams Apples: New Beginnings (2012)

== Release ==
Official trailer for the first Chapter in the series was released on 15 April 2011. The first installment in the series premiered on 21 April 2011 and the concluding chapter was released on 25 May 2012. A complete DVD set, containing all ten films in the series was released in December 2012. Adams Apples is available for streaming on Demand Africa.

== Critical reception ==
Each film in the series was generally positively received. Nollywood Reinvented, in its review of the film's final installment, praised everything about the film and commented: "Shirley was successful in making this movie ‘more than a conqueror’. The fascinating thing about the Adams Apples movies is the wide range of topics it touches on (if not fully addresses). Conquering love in the face of age differences... how to deal with competitive love... the ability to discern lust from love, a quest for adventure and a lean towards reality... dealing with the mistakes of the past. Above all, realizing the importance of family and trusting God to work things out". Victor Olatoye of Nollywood Critics, in his review of chapter 1 to 3 of the film, commended the character development, gave a 3.5 out of 4 stars and concluded: "If you are looking for a good movie that can make you feel a little happier, smarter, sexier, funnier, more excited and yet full of wahala if that's what you want, then Adams Apples it is. Go ahead and take a pluck, sink your teeth in them, but just know there will be troubles". Circumspecte in its overview of the film series comments: "I'll employ one word to describe Shirley Frimpong Manso's latest film, Adams Apples - delightful. And it is, in every sense of the word. From the script, to the characters, to the picture quality, the music, costume, promotion, everything really, was tastefully done".
