= YOLO (2016 TV series) =

Ghanaian television series

- Created by: Ivan Quashigah
- Written by: Eddie Seddoh; Selassie Yao
- Starring: Aaron Adatsi; Queenstar Anaafi; Chiiief; JB Peasah; Jackie Appiah; Adjetey Anang; Makafui Fella; Evelyn Galle-Ansah
- Country of origin: Ghana
- Original languages: Ghanaian Pidgin; English; Twi; Ga
- No. of seasons: 5

Production
- Producer: Farmhouse Productions

Yolo (You Only Live Once) is a Ghanaian teenage TV series. The series is a sequel of the Ghanaian TV series Things We Do for Love. It advises and directs the youth concerning the challenges they face in their adolescence. A television series produced and directed by Ivan Quashigah.

From Farm House Production, Yolo premiered in 2016. It airs on TV3 Ghana and Africa Magic.

Farmhouse Production introduced some new characters alongside the old one of which includes Kelvin Bruun as Mark Anthony, Ama Ampofo Ababio as Ariana, Akosua Asare Brewu as Tilly, and Joseph Delove August as Odenkyem. The script was written by Selassie Yao and directed by Ivan Quashigah as usual.

‘The YOLO TV Series’ is a National Population Council initiative in partnership with Ghana Health Service, Ghana Education Service & National Youth Authority (Ghana) which is facilitated by Communicate For Health and FHI360 and funded by USAID.

Farm House Production announced episode 13 to be the final episode of the fifth season in August 2019. Season 6 received continued funding from the Ghanaian Ministry of Health.

== Cast ==
=== Old ===
- Aaron Adatsi
- Queenstar Anaafi
- Chiiief
- JB Peasah
- Jackie Appiah
- Adjetey Anang
- Fella Makafui
- Evelyn Galle-Ansah
- Kimberly Sarpong
- Jason Edwards

=== New characters in season 5 ===
- Kelvin Bruun
- Ama Ampofo Ababio
- Akosua Asare Brewu
- Joseph Delove August
- Etornam Bedi
- William Odartei Lamptey
- Jelson Anum Ashitei
- kelvin troy

=== Writers ===
- Eddie Seddoh(S1-4)
- Selassie Yao(S5)
