= Fix Us =

2019 Ghanaian film

- Directed by: Pascal Amanfo
- Screenplay by: Pascal Amanfo; Yvonne Nelson
- Produced by: Yvonne Nelson
- Starring: Yvonne Nelson; Yvonne Okoro; Alexandra Amon; Prince David Osei; Michelle Attoh; Jessica Williams; Belinda Dzattah; Hajia4Real; Irene Logan; Mofe Duncan; Tobi Bakre
- Cinematography: John Passah
- Edited by: Okey Benson
- Music by: Bernie Anti
- Production company: YN Productions
- Release date: 6 December 2019
- Country: Ghana
- Language: English

Fix Us is a 2019 Ghanaian movie produced by Yvonne Nelson and directed by Pascal Amanfo. The film won several awards at the Ghana Movie Awards.

== Plot ==
Three young woman who had ambitions of becoming superstars meet at an audition ground having similar dreams. They became friends and later on in life had their dreams come true, but they felt that something was missing in their lives after achieving fame and wealth.

== Cast ==
- Yvonne Nelson as Naadei Mills
- Yvonne Okoro as Chioma Williams
- Alexandra Amon as Jaya Aseidu
- Prince David Osei as Greg
- Michelle Attoh as Wendy
- Jessica Williams as Dona
- Belinda Dzattah as Timi
- Mona Montrage (Hajia4Reall) as Abi
- Irene Logan as Ama
- Mofe Duncan as Randy
- Tobi Bakre as Jojo
- Sekyere Appiah-Agyei as Judge
- David Mantse Ankrah as Kwesi
- Nana Ekua Amakoah Adinkra as Makeup Artist
- Jameel Aliyu Buba as Ray
- Kweku Elliot as Ruffy

== Production ==
Several African actors were announced as starring in the film, which included Yvonne Okoro, Prince David Osei, and Michelle Attoh. The film marked the acting debut for social media influencer Hajia4Reall and musician Irene Logan.

== Release ==
Fix Us premiered in Ghana on 6 December 2019 at the Silverbird Theaters in Accra, after which it screened in Ghana as well as in other areas of Africa. In 2020 the movie premiered on Netflix.

== Reception ==
Pulse Nigeria listed Fix Us as one of the best new Ghanaian films of the year, with both the outlet and Glitz Africa magazine noting that it had received a positive reception upon release. Kemi Filani News was critical of the movie, stating that it contained "bad acting, shabby story-telling, poor continuity, over dwelling on one scene and lots more annoying issues."

=== Awards ===
- Ghana Movie Award for Performance as an Actress in a Supporting Role (won, Michelle Atton)
- Ghana Movie Award for Sound Editing and Mixing (won, Bernie Anti)
- Ghana Movie Award for Cinematography (won, John Passah)
- Ghana Movie Award for Music Original Score (won, Berni Anti)
- Ghana Movie Award for Writing Adapted or Original Screenplay (won, Pascal Amanfo)
