= Kejetia vs Makola =

Ghanaian comedy television series

- Genre: Comedy
- Starring: Louis Lamis Richmond Xavier Amoakoh; Nana Gyasi Owusu; Clemento Suarez; General Ntatia Isaac Antwi
- Country of origin: Ghana
- Original language: English

Original release
- Release: July 2, 2017

Kejetia vs Makola is a Ghanaian courtroom satirical comic TV series. The series features two categories of lawyers, namely a group of well-educated lawyers from Makola and self-acclaimed individuals who call themselves lawyers from Kejetia representing their clients respectively. The show is produced by Leizer Legacy Productions.

== Cast ==
- Richmond Xavier Amoakoh - as Lawyer Nti
- Louis Lamis
- Nana Gyasi Owusu
- Clemento Suarez
- General Ntatia
- Isaac Antwi - as Punisher

== Invited guests ==
- KiDi
- Kwaku Darlington
- Efia Odo
- Kuami Eugene
- Amerado
- Lord Paper
- Shatta Wale
