= William Addo =

Ghanaian actor (1952/1953–2025)

- Born: 1952 or 1953; Gold Coast (now Ghana)
- Died: 22 November 2025 (aged 72); Ghana
- Other names: Willie Addo, Akpatse
- Citizenship: Ghanaian citizenship
- Education: University of Ghana, University of Leeds
- Occupations: Actor, film director and producer, lecturer
- Known for: Death After Birth, Children of the Mountain, Rejected 1 & 2

William Addo (1952 or 1953 – 22 November 2025), also known as Akpatse, was a Ghanaian actor and film producer who made significant contributions to the Ghanaian film industry. Before making appearances in several Ghanaian films, Addo worked as a theatre performer.

== Education ==
Addo attended the University of Ghana where he obtained a degree in Drama and Theatre Studies and was retained as a teaching assistant because of his performance. He had a scholarship to study in University of Leeds in the United Kingdom where he obtained his master's degree in Theatre Studies, majoring in Acting and Directing. He came back to be a lecturer where he was in charge of Theatre Arts Department of the School of Performing Arts, University of Ghana.

== Career ==
Addo worked at the National Theatre where he was in charge of the production of a concert party.

== Personal life ==
=== Blindness ===
Following unsuccessful surgeries, Addo became completely blind and was making a plea for help in raising funds for medication.

He disclosed that although doctors had diagnosed him with glaucoma and cataracts, they had also informed him that his condition was incurable.

“Hmm, I have totally gone blind...all the surgeries I underwent years back have been in vain. The deterioration of my eyes started again early last year (2018)," he sadly revealed. He continued,” When it started, I went to a hospital in Sogakope, and I underwent a series of tests, and doctors diagnosed that it is a combination of glaucoma and cataracts; and to my utter dismay, doctors told me its incurable …so am now totally blind."

=== Death ===
Addo died after a long illness on 22 November 2025, at the age of 72.

== Filmography ==
- Rejected 1 & 2 (1994) as Kojo Davidson
- Obaa Hemaa (2007) as Efo
- The Pastor's Wife (2008) as Pastor Attipoe
- Sikawura (2009) as Mr. Narh
- Death After Birth (2011) as Mr. Asare
- Chronicles of Odumkrom: The Headmaster (2015) as Opanyin Acheampong
- Children of the Mountain (2016) as Xsavo

== Other works ==
Seasons from 1985 to 1986 at the Trinity Repertory Company Theatre in Providence, Rhode Island, he performed in George M. Cohan's play "The Tavern," alongside the actors Frederick Sullivan Jr., Becca Lish, Keith Jochim, David Kennett, William Damkoehler, Margot Dionne, Ed Hall, Barbara Blossom, Jennifer Van Dyck, Steven Jermanovich, Howard London, John Robert Wright, Paul Buxton, and Henrik Kromann. The director was Tony Giordano. Designer of the scenery was Robert D. Soule. Lighting was created by John F. Custer. William Lane created the costumes.
