= Gavivina Tamakloe =

Ghanaian Actor

- Education: University Of Oslo, University of Ghana
- Occupation: Actor
- Years active: 1986- till present

Gavivina Tamakloe is a Ghanaian veteran actor who has featured in a lot of movies. He is known for the role he played in the Ghanaian TV series Taxi Driver as “Pastor Gbetoreme”. He hails from Wuti, Keta District in the Volta Region

== Education ==
He studied drama and theatre arts and English at the University of Ghana, Legon and then continue to University Of Oslo, Norway respectively for his master's degree.

== Career ==
Gavivina started his acting career as a stage performer in 1986, he then joined the Theatre group company called the Talents Theatre Company which was partially owned by National Mobilization Program, headed by Mr Kofi Portorphi. Through this he acted with the likes of David Dontoh, Anima Missa, Kofi Dovlo, and many others who understood the basics of stage acting.

== Filmography ==
List of movies.

- Taxi Driver
- Sun City
- Heart of Men
- Bleeding Love 1 & 2
- Return of Beyonce 1 & 2
- Princess Tyra 1,2 & 3
- Crime to Christ 1,2 &3
- Expensive Vow 1 & 2
- Save My Love 1 & 2
