= Samuel Ofori (actor) =

Ghanaian actor

- Occupations: actor, director and movie producer.

Samuel Ofori is a Ghanaian actor, director and movie producer.

== Career ==
He is the chief executive officer of Two Eyes Films.

== Filmography ==
- Akurasi Burgers 1,2 & 3 (2008) as Seth
- Fake London Boy
- Our Judges (2015)
- The Devil Between My Legs (2017) as George
- Big Girls 1 & 2
- Honeymoon (2019) as Robert
