= GhanaWeb =

Ghana-focused news and opinion website

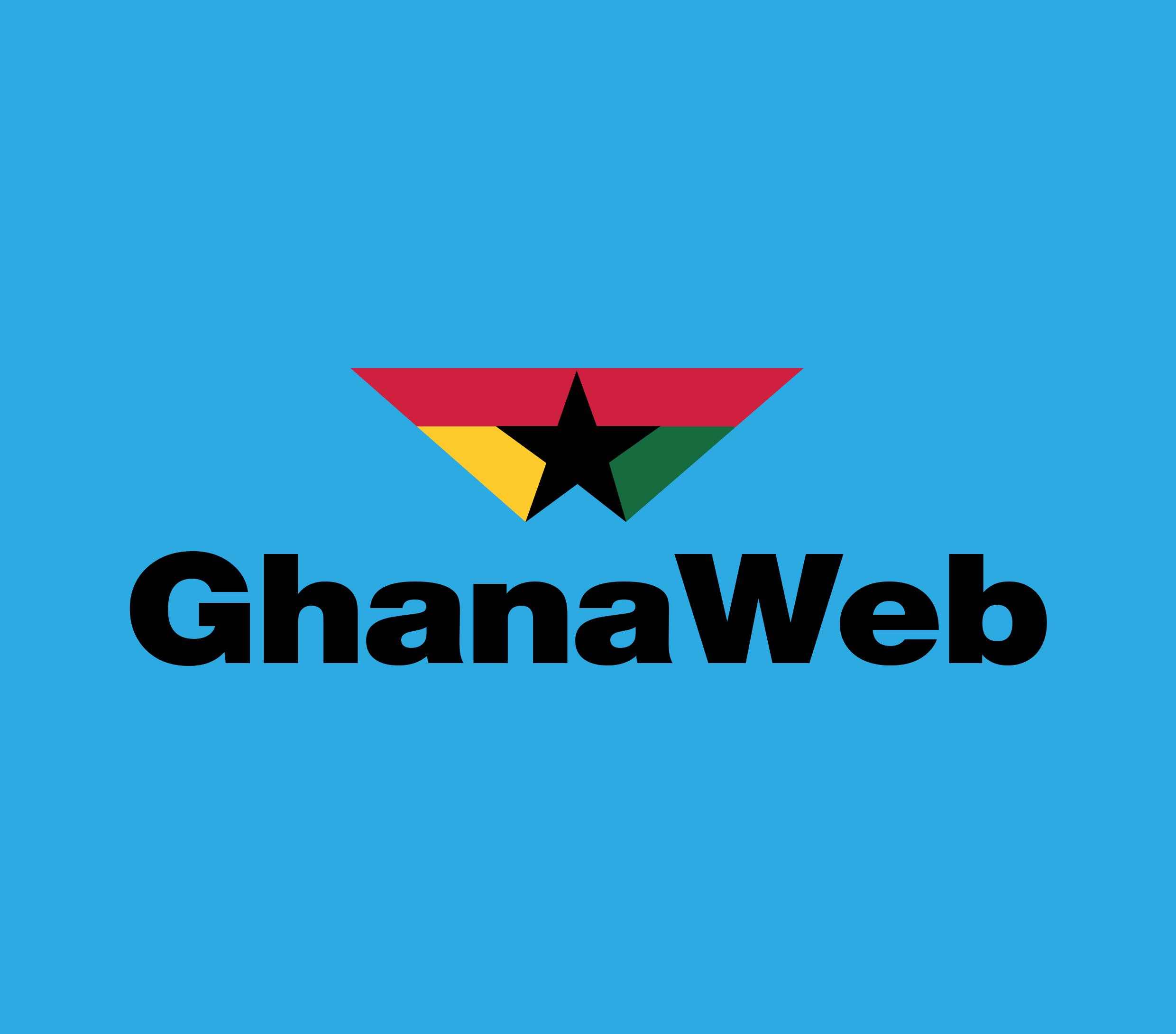
- GhanaWeb
- Website type: General news and information
- Available in: English
- Owner: Bellaart Investments B.V.
- Website: ghanaweb.com
- Commercial: Yes
- Registration: Optional
- Launched: January 1, 1999; 27 years ago
- Current status: Online

GhanaWeb, founded as GhanaHomePage, is a Ghanaian portal, content curation and syndication website covering news, politics, business, sports, entertainment, opinions and general information about Ghana. It was launched by GhanaWeb B.V., a privately owned Dutch company in 1999. It also offers background information, classifieds, radio stations and a social network for Ghanaians and the Diaspora.

GhanaWeb is owned by Bellaart Investments B.V. It has evolved over the years to include video content (GhanaWeb TV) and social media components as well as a mobile app (GhanaWeb Reporter).

== History ==
Ghanaweb.com began in 1992 by Akoto Francis as GhanaHomePage. It was a print magazine serving the growing Ghanaian community in Amsterdam by collating news stories from Ghanaian newspapers.

In 1999, the website was renamed as GhanaWeb. - a blog on the domain of the University of Uta in Finland - which was conceived in the early nineties by a Ghanaian lecturer working in Finland. GhanaWeb.com/GhanaHomePage featured links to news, sports, announcements, chat rooms, a Ghanaian dictionary and many other resources. News stories from Ghana were republished from different sources and mailing lists from magazines.

GhanaWeb has currently evolved from a news aggregator to a producer of original content. It also has a mobile app. In 2020, it won the first Google News Initiative (GNI) Innovation Challenge for its GhanaWeb Reporter project.

== Initiatives ==
In February 2020, GhanaWeb was the only Ghanaian media company to receive funding from Google (Google News Initiative (GNI) Innovation) to enable the media company to thrive in a digital era and expand its projects.

In July 2020, GhanaWeb partnered with Africa Consumer Pane, a cooperative effort between the digital publisher Africa Business Communities and market research firm MSI-ACI, to launch the Ghana Election Polls, conducted monthly to enable citizens express their opinions and projections of the 2020 elections.
