= Roselyn Ngissah =

Ghanaian actress

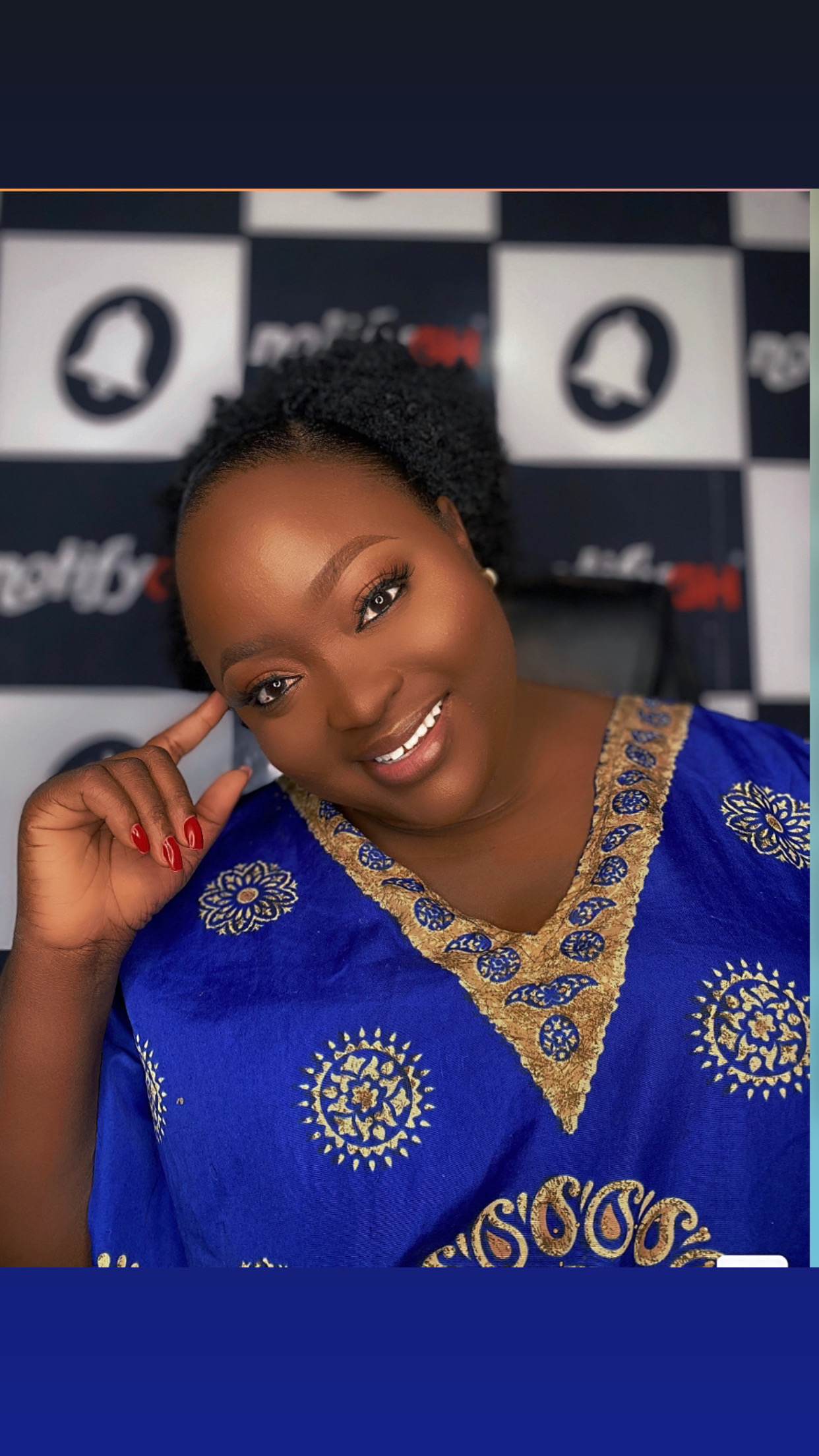
- Born: Roselyn Ngissah
- Education: University of Ghana, Legon
- Occupation: Actress
- Years active: 2003-present

Roselyn Ngissah is a Ghanaian actress. She started acting in 2003, and has featured in movies including Adams Apple, Away Bus, and Princess Tyra.

== Early life and education ==
Roselyn, born to Ghanaian parents, grew up in Lagos, Nigeria where she had her basic education. She attended Tema Senior High School and further graduated at the University of Ghana, Legon with a second class upper degree in Theatre Art in 2008.

Roselyn earned her first film role in Sicily, 2003. While playing small parts in several movies, she nabbed her breakthrough role as Angie in 4Play and 4Play Reloaded in 2010 and 2011 respectively.

== Personal life ==
Roselyn is a mother of one.

== Filmography ==
- Adams Apples (2011)
- Princess Tyra (2007)
- Power of The Gods
- Last Victory
- My Sister's Honour
- 4 Play (2010) as Angie
- Broken Mirror (2014) as Evelyn
- John and John (2017)
- Somewhere in Africa (2011) as Capt. Rajilla
- Away Bus (2019) as Aku
- Amakye and Dede (2016)
- Pauline's Diary (2017) as Vivian
- Sin of the soul
- 40 Looks Good on You (2019)
- The Miser
- Aloe Vera (2020) as Aleomay
- Trending Crimes (2020) as Gloria
- Charade (2021) as Slim Sexy
- Red Carpet (2022)
- A Taste of Sin (2023) as Nana
- The Fisherman (2024) as Market Woman

== Achievements ==
Year	Event	Award	Country	Ref
2010	Ghana Movie Awards	Best ‘Lead’ Actress	Ghana	
2011	PAMSA	Best Supporting Actress	Nigeria	
2013	PAMSA	Best Supporting Actress	Nigeria	
2015	3G Awards	Choice Award	USA	
2015	Afrifimo	Favorite Actress	USA	
2017	People's Choice Awards	Best Actress	Ghana	
2017	Golden Movie Awards Africa	Best Supporting Actress	Ghana	
2018	GH Showbiz Awards	Best Actress	Ghana	
2018	NEALA Awards	Best Supporting Actress	England	
2018	Ghana Film Submit	The Legendary Awards	Ghana	
2018	GHNaija Showbiz Awards	Best Actress	Ghana	
2019	Social Media Awards	Best Actress	Ghana	
2019	Ghana Actors & Entertainers Awards	Best Actress	Ghana	
2020	Ghana Movie Award	Best Supporting Actress	Ghana	
2020	Women’s Choice Award, Africa	Best Actress	Ghana	
2021	Youth Choice Award	Favourite Actress	Ghana	
2022	Showbiz Excellent Awards	Outstanding Actress	Ghana	
2022	Social Media Awards	Honoree Walk of Fame	Ghana	
2023	2nd Supreme Dynamic Talent Academy Awards (SDTA Awards)	Actress of the Decade	Ghana	

== Philanthropy ==
In December 2019, Roselyn collaborated with Edem Fairre Foundation and Twellium Foundation to present drinks to children in Sukura near Dansoman, and also to party with them. With the support of Blumax, she also presented gari mix and sugar to 10 widows to begin small businesses in the community.
