= Yvonne Okoro =

Ghanaian-Nigerian actress (born 1984)

- Okoro at the 2014 Africa Magic Viewers Choice Awards
- Born: Chinyere Yvonne Okoro; 25 November 1984 (age 41); Tamale, Ghana
- Citizenship: Ghanaian, Nigerian
- Education: University of Ghana
- Occupation: Actress
- Years active: 2002–present
- Awards: Africa Magic Viewers' Choice Award
- Website: yvonneokoro.com

Chinyere Yvonne Okoro is a Ghanaian and Nigerian actress. Born to a Nigerian Igbo father and Ghanaian mother, Yvonne Okoro is of mixed lineage and calls herself an African. Yvonne Okoro is from Koforidua in the Eastern Parts of Ghana. She received Ghana Movie Awards Best Actress Award in 2010 and was nominated for Africa Movie Academy Awards Best Actress twice in a row in 2011 and 2012 for her movies Pool Party and Single Six. She has also received four Africa Magic Viewers' Choice Award and in 2012 was honoured with a Distinguished Achievement Award at the Nigeria Excellence Awards.

== Early life ==
Born to a Ghanaian mother and a Nigerian father, Yvonne Okoro is of mixed lineage and calls herself an African. She comes from a very large family, as the first child of her mother and the fifth of all siblings. She, from a young age, showed a desire to be an actress. She attended Achimota Preparatory School after which she went to the Lincoln Community School and then to Faith Montessori School. She continued at Mfantsiman Girls Secondary School after which she enrolled at University of Ghana, Legon where she did Bachelor of Arts, combining English and Linguistics. Subsequently, she was at the Universite de Nantes in France to study Press Civilization, Drama and Marketing.

== Career ==
She made her screen debut in Sticking to the Promise, a 2002 movie produced by the Nigerian producer Theo Akatugba, just after her Senior High Education. She also played a cameo role in the hit series Tentacles by the same producer for Point Blank Media Concepts.

As of 2018, she is the host of Dining with Cooks and Braggarts. Cooks and Braggarts is a celebrity cooking show that features well-known figures to mint their hands on how they cook their favorite foods while speaking about various topics.

== Awards ==
In 2019, she was awarded the Glitz Africa Style Influencer of the Year during the 5th edition of the Glitz Style Awards. She also received the Best Radio and TV Personality of the Year award at the 2019 Women's Choice Awards.

== Other ventures ==
She made it known to Accra-based radio Peace FM that she owns her own company Desamour Company Limited, as well as other transport business.

== Philanthropy ==
In June 2019, she donated $10,000 to the Black Queens of Ghana ahead for winning the bronze medal at 2019 WAFU Zone B tournament. At the start of 2020, she also donated some items to maternity ward of the Korle bu Teaching Hospital.

== Filmography ==
- Queen Lateefah
- Mother's love
- Beyonce: The President's Daughter (2006) as Ciara
- The Return Of Beyonce (2006) as Ciara Mensah
- The President's Daughter
- Desperate To Survive
- The Game (2010) as Brandy Osei
- Agony Of Christ (2008)
- Royal Battle (2007)
- Queen Of Dreams
- ‘Le Hotelier’ in France
- Pool Party (2011)
- Sticking to the promise
- Single Six (2011) as Titania
- Why Marry (2011) as Janice Williams
- Best Friends (Three can play)
- Blood is Thick
- Four Play (2010) as Ruby
- Four Play Reloaded (2010) as Ruby
- Forbidden City (2012) as Owusua
- Contract (28th Dec. 2012) with Hlomlo Dandala. as Abena Boateng
- I Broke My Heart (2011) as Melody
- Adams Apples film series (2011–2012) as Baaba
- Crime
- Ghana Must Go (2016) as Ama
- Rebecca (2016) as Rebecca
- Like Cotton Twines (2016) as Sarah
- Boxing Day: A Day After Christmas (2017) as Angel Adeyemi
- Fix Us (2019) as Chioma Williams
- Chasing Lullaby (2021)
