= Peter Sedufia =

Ghanaian filmmaker

- Born: Peter Kofi Sedufia
- Occupations: filmmaker and producer.
- Notable work: Keteke

Peter Kofi Sedufia is a Ghanaian filmmaker and producer.

== Biography ==
Peter Kofi Sedufia is a prominent Ghanaian filmmaker, director, and producer known for his innovative storytelling and commitment to elevating African cinema.

Sedufia studied film directing at the National Film and Television Institute (NAFTI) in Ghana, graduating with a BFA. He also holds a diploma in business management and administration. His career began with short films like The Traveller (2014), which won multiple awards including the Special Jury Prize at FESPACO 2015 .

== Filmography ==
=== Feature films ===
- 2017: Keteke
- 2018: Sidechic Gang
- 2020: Aloe Vera

=== Short films ===
- 2014: The Traveller
- 2016: Master and 3 Maids
