= Shirley Frimpong-Manso =

Ghanaian film director and producer

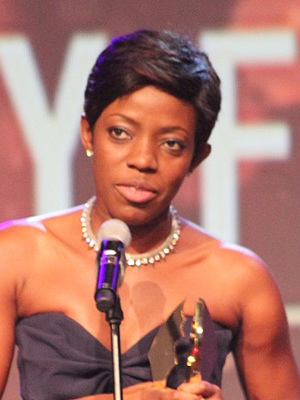
- Shirley Frimpong-Manso at the 2014 Africa Magic Viewers Choice Awards in Lagos
- Born: 16 March 1977 (age 49); Kwahu East District
- Occupations: Film director and producer
- Spouse: Ken Attoh (married 2009–present)
- Website: www.sparrowstation.com

Shirley Frimpong-Manso, (born March 16, 1977 in Kwahu East District) is a Ghanaian film director, writer, and producer. She is the founder and CEO of Sparrow Productions, a film, television and advertising production company. She won Best Director at the 6th Africa Movie Academy Awards. Frimpong-Manso is also a principal of Sparrow Station, a video streaming service for African entertainment from Sparrow and other African film producers. In 2013, she was ranked the 48th most influential person in Ghana according to E.tv Ghana.

== Career ==
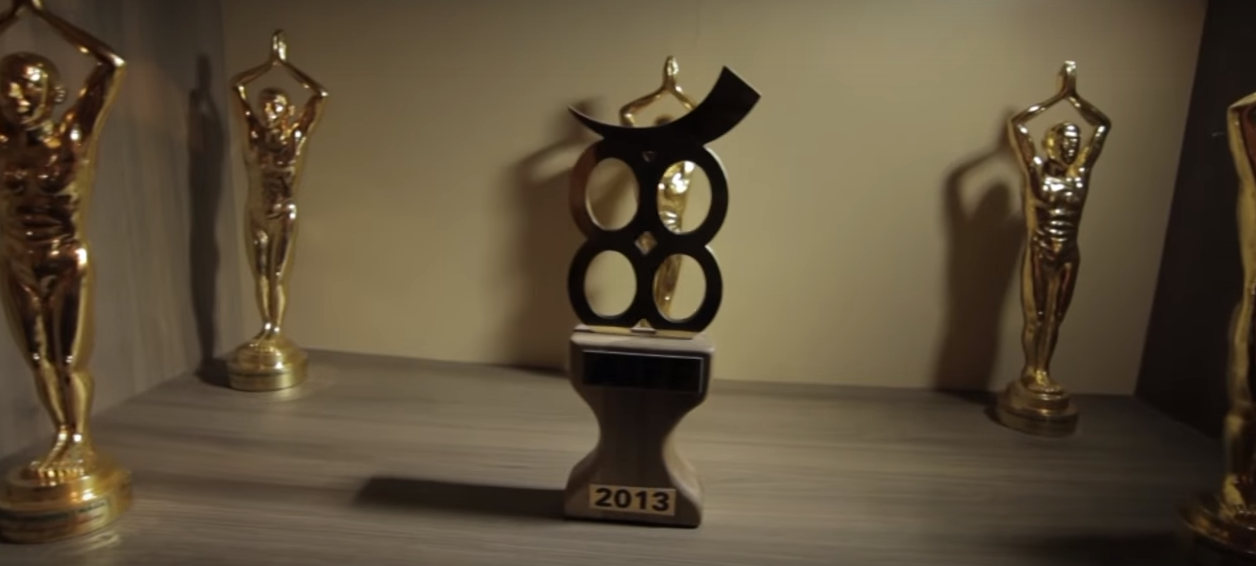
Her awards

Frimpong-Manso is from Kwahu Pepease in the Eastern Region of Ghana. As a child she organized plays, which "felt a lot more fun than playing with sand and dolls". She graduated in 2000 from the National Film and Television Institute popularly known as NAFTI in Ghana and worked as a presenter at Radio Gold, a private station in Accra, and then went on to start Sparrow Productions in 2003.

She is the founder and CEO of Sparrow Productions, a film, television and advertising production company. She won Best Director at the 6th Africa Movie Academy Awards. Frimpong-Manso is also a principal of Sparrow Station, a video streaming service for African entertainment from Sparrow and other African film producers. In 2013, she was ranked the 48th most influential person in Ghana according to E.tv Ghana.

Frimpong-Manso is described as one who "seeks to raise the standard of film production in Ghana and Africa by telling progressive African stories as seen through the eyes of Africans." Changing the way Ghana was portrayed also motivated her career choice. Her films are also known for their "fierce female leads," as they portray African women with agency who can be breadwinners and lead complex lives. In December 2019, her movie Potato Potahto started streaming on Netflix. Frimpong Manso launched her Sparrow Station YouTube channel in March 2025.

== Personal life ==
Her husband and business partner is Ken Attoh, and they have a child together.

== Works ==
With producer and actress Juliet Asante, Frimpong-Manso helped produce the TV show Heart to Heart for two years shortly after school. She has also produced:

- Different Shades of Blue – a television series about five university girls who share a dormitory in a university hostel.
- Personalities Kitchen – a cooking programme that hosts two personalities and challenges them to a rice meal of their choice.
- The Miss Ghana Pageant – she produced two semifinalists at the Miss World event within five years during her time.
- Madam – a television series starring Joselyn Dumas as a powerful and conniving leader of a non-profit. The show is produced by Akwaaba Magic, and created by Shirley Frimpong Manso.

== Filmography ==
Film	Production Year	Distribution Companies	Production Type	Notes
Life and Living it	2009	Sparrow Station	Film	The stories of four male friends: a musician, a dancer, a doctor, and an advertising manager. "Major themes include love, friendship, and family."
Scorned	2009	Sparrow Station	Film	
The Perfect Picture	2009	Sparrow Station	Film	The story of the lives and loves of three Ghanaian women friends, focusing on marriage and societal norms of Ghana that are not represented in Western film. Frimpong-Manso won Best Director for The Perfect Picture at the 2010 Africa Movie Academy Awards, where her films garnered a total of four awards.
A Sting in a Tale	2009	Sparrow Station	Film	"A cautionary tale about two Ghanaian men scrambling to find jobs." It won an Audience Favorite award at the 2010 Pan African Film & Arts Festival
Checkmate	2010	Sparrow Station	Film	
6 Hours to Christmas	2010	Sparrow Station	Film	A tale of a creative director whose life was overturned when he was tempted to stray on Christmas Eve.
Peep	2011	Sparrow Station TV3	TV series	
Contract	2012	Sparrow Station	Film	A successful businessman who desires to avoid marital responsibility contracts with a woman to bear his child. Six nominations at 2013 Africa Movie Academy Awards, including best director. Won four awards at 2014 Africa Magic Viewers Choice Awards, including best movie.
Adams Apples	2011–2013	Sparrow Station	TV series	A 10-part serial released during one year starting in April 2011. It follows the lives of four women (a mother and three adult children) in modern Ghana.
Potomanto	2013	Sparrow Station Africa Magic	Film	About "an emotionally sore private investigator who mistakenly stumbles on a case of organ harvesting." Nine nominations at 2014 Africa Movie Academy Awards, including best film and best director.
Big for Nothing	2013	Sparrow Station	Short film	
Stranger in my Bed	2013	Sparrow Station	Short film	
Tenant	2013	Africa Magic	TV series	
Devil in the Detail	2014	Sparrow Station Africa Magic	Film	Suspicions of marital infidelity. "Shirley Frimpong-Manso toyed with us and tripped us up over whether Helen cheated on her husband. At first it was Ben that was suspicious of Helen but then she literally flipped the script and Helen became suspicious of Ben. The core of the movie deals with morality...." One nomination for 2015 Africa Movie Academy Awards
Love or Something Like That	2014	Sparrow Station Africa Magic	Film	
V-Republic	2014	Sparrow Station	TV series	
Grey Dawn	2015	Sparrow Station Africa Magic	Film	
Shampaign	2016	Sparrow Station	TV series	A drama featuring a woman campaigning to be president of Ghana. "'Shampaign' takes inspiration from the recent events that have dominated pop culture, from America’s election, to the inability of Nigeria or Ghana to present a strong female political aspirant."
Rebecca	2016	Sparrow Station	Film	"Abandoned and lost in the middle of a deserted road, an egotistic proper city guy gets a rude awakening when he begins to realize that his only companion, a timid-looking village girl who he had been forced to marry only a few hours earlier, is anything but ordinary." Nominated in two categories for Africa Magic Viewers Choice Awards
Potato Potahto	2017		Film	A "hilarious spin on divorce." "The movie tells the story of a couple, who decide to still live in their matrimonial home even after they split up." Nominated in five categories for Africa Magic Viewers Choice Awards
The Perfect Picture: Ten Years Later	2019		Film	A sequel to The Perfect Picture. The three leads are ten years older, and their relationships are not so prefect. It won both Best Ghanaian Movie of the Year and Best Movie of the Year at the 2021 Citi TV Entertainment Achievement Awards.
Us In Between	2020	Sparrow Station	Film	The story of the COVID-19 pandemic and its effects on human life.
Two of a Kind	2024	Sparrow Station	Film	Rita Dominic portrays a resort owner in "Two of a Kind" who is attempting to mend the shattered marriage of a young couple celebrating their first anniversary at her resort while also coping with her own tragedy plus three other couples exhibiting "multiple variations on marital strife".
For Love and Country	2025	Sparrow Station	Film	The incoming First Lady finds her lover dead in her hotel room bed just a few days before her husband is sworn in as the nation's president.

== Awards ==
- 6th Africa Movie Academy Awards - Best Director of the Year
- 6th Africa Movie Academy Awards - A Sting in a Tale won the Best Soundtrack award
- 18th Annual Pan African Film & Arts Festival - A Sting In A Tale took home the award for Audience Favorite-Narrative Feature
- 2014 Africa Magic Viewers Choice Awards - Best Movie Director, Best Video Editor, and (jointly with Hertey Owusu) Best Writer (Drama), Contract won Best Movie.
- In March 2021, she was awarded the Film Director of the Year in the Citi TV Entertainment Achievement Awards.
