= Adjetey Anang =

Ghanaian actor (born 1973)

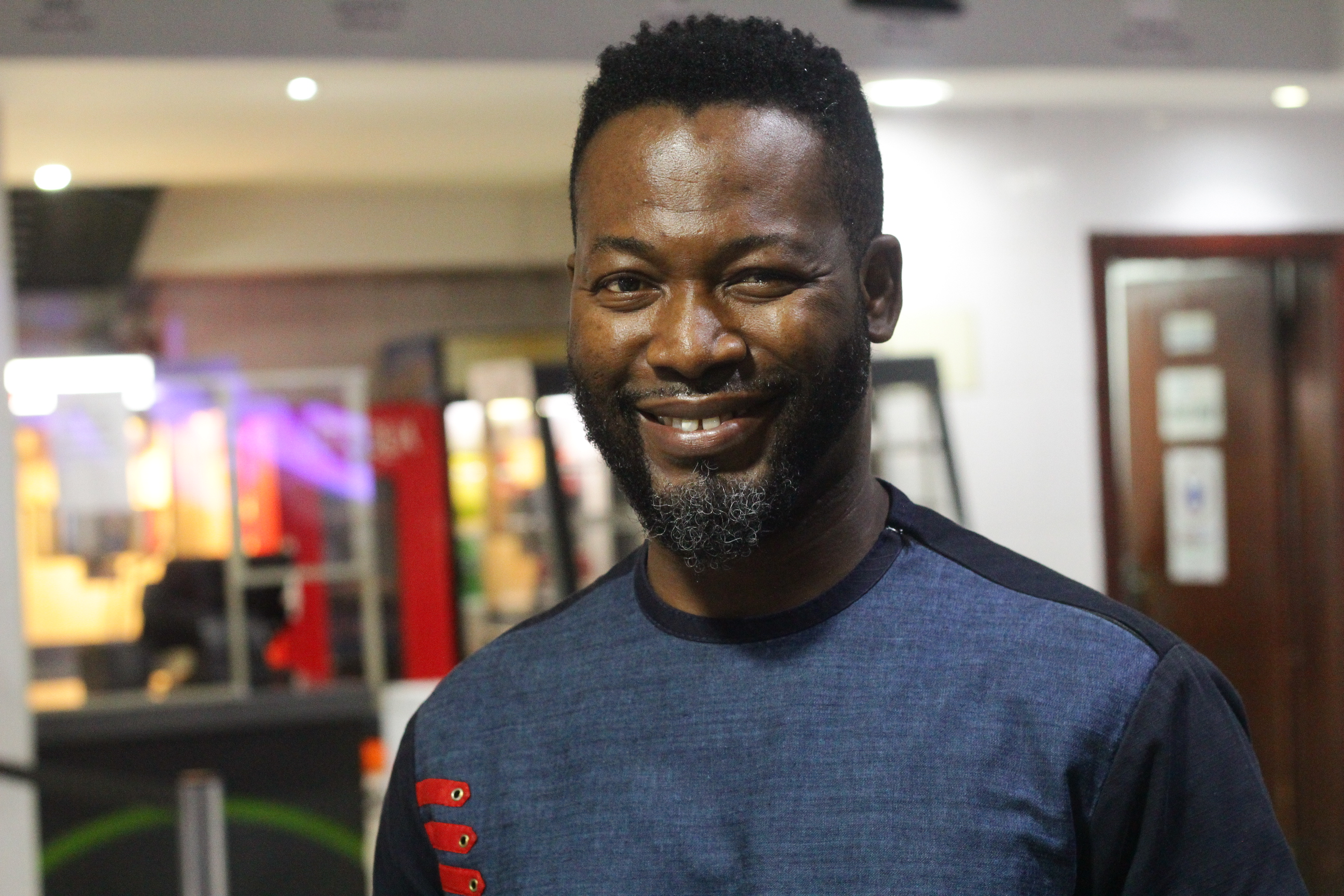
- Born: Adjetey Anang; 7 July 1973 (age 53)
- Other name: Pusher
- Education: Fine arts, University of Ghana
- Occupation: Actor
- Known for: Deadly Voyage, A String in a Tale, The Perfect Picture, Slavery, Doublecross, Sugar
- Spouse: Elorm Anang
- Children: 1
- Awards: 2022 Exclusive Men of the Year Africa Awards; Actor of the Year, Ghana Union of Theatre Societies (GUTS) Best Actor Award

Adjetey Anang (born 8 July 1973) is a Ghanaian actor. He is best known for his portrayal of the character Pusher in the television series Things We Do for Love and YOLO. He has featured in many Ghanaian films, including Deadly Voyage, A Sting in a Tale, and The Perfect Picture, as well as the Dutch film Slavery.

== Education ==
Anang attended Labone Senior High School and studied fine arts at the University of Ghana. He later earned a master's degree in dramatic arts from Wits University in Johannesburg.

== Career ==
Anang has starred in several Ghanaian television series, including YOLO, which addresses youth and adolescence related issues.

He was among the actors who announced the nominations for the 2023 Africa Magic Viewers' Choice Awards.

== Memoir ==
In July 2023, Anang launched his book, Adjetey Anang: A Story of Faith, Imperfection, and Resilience. The book chronicles his early life, career in the film industry and his personal experiences. The launch coincided with his 50th birthday.

== Personal life ==
Anang is married to Elom, and they have a son.

== Filmography ==
- Broken Heart (1999)
- Things We Do For Love (2000) as Pusher
- Life and Living it (2009) as Jerry Klevor
- The Perfect Picture (2009) as Fela
- A Sting in a Tale (2009) as Kuuku
- Adams Apples: The Family Ties (2011)
- Adams Apples: Musical Chairs (2011)
- Adams Apples: Torn (2011)
- Adams Apples: Twisted connections (2011)
- Adams Apples: Duplicity (2011)
- Adams Apples: Confessions (2011)
- Adams Apples: Showdown (2011)
- Adams Apples: Fight or Flight (2012)
- Adams Apples: New Beginnings (2012)
- Adams Apples: Rescue Mission (2012)
- The Pledge: Ghana will not burn (2012)
- Potomanto (2013) as Adane
- Double Cross (2014) as Ben Boateng
- Devil in the Detail (2014) as Ben Ofori
- Kintampo (2017)
- Sink or Swim: The Perilous Journey (2017)
- My Very Ghanaian Wedding (2017) as Paul Opong
- Potato Potahto (2017) as Ato Brown
- Keteke (2017) as Boi
- Sidechic Gang (2018) as Sefa
- YOLO
- Sin City (2019) as Akeem
- Sugar (2019) as Nii Kpakpo
- Gold Coast Lounge (2019) as John Donkor
- Citation (2020) as Kwesi
- Aloe Vera (2020) as Aleodin
- Our Jesus Story (2020)
- Movement-Japa (2021) as Black Arrow
- Dede

== Awards ==
Anang's role in Things We Do for Love was popular with audiences. He has received several awards including the Arts Critique and Review Association of Ghana (ACRAG) Talent Award and the Ghana Union of Theatre Societies (GUTS) Best Actor Award. He was nominated for Best Supporting Actor at the 8th Africa Magic Viewers' Choice Awards for his role in Gold Coast Lounge. In 2022, he won Actor of the Year at the Exclusive Men of the Year Africa Awards.
