= McBrown Kitchen =

Ghanaian television cooking show

The McBrown Kitchen is a Ghanaian television program hosted by actress Nana Ama Mcbrown, that previously aired on United Television and currently aired on TV3. It is a television cooking show that interviews celebrities whiles cooking their favorite dishes.

== Awards and honors ==
Year	Event	Category	Recipient	Result
2018	Radio and Television Personality Awards	TV DEV'T SHOW OF THE YEAR 2017-2018	McBrown Kitchen	Nominated
2018	Radio and Television Personality Awards	TV FEMALE PRESENTER OF THE YEAR 2017-2018	Nana Ama McBrown	Nominated
2018	TV series Awards	OUTSTANDING VARIETY TALK SHOW	McBrown Kitchen	Nominated
2019	Radio and Television Personality Awards	TV ENTERTAINMENT PROGRAM OF THE YEAR	McBrown Kitchen	Won
2019	Ghana Movies Award	OUTSTANDING VARIETY TALK SHOW	McBrown Kitchen	Won

== Appearance ==
The following personalities have been interviewed on the show.

- James Gardiner
- Benedicta Gafah
- Conan O'Brien
- Sam Richardson
- Efia Odo
- Amerado
- Empress Gifty
- Bill Asamoah
- Kwaku Manu
- Christiana Awuni
- Wayoosi
- Prince David Osei
- Naana Hayford
- Papa Kumasi
- Nana Agyakoma Dufie
- Kafui Danku
- Kwaku Twamasi
- Nana Ansah Kwao IV
- Joyce Blessing
- Funny Face
- Akumaa Mama Zimbi
- Flowking Stone
- Yvonne Nelson
- Gloria Safo
- Kalybos
- Nikki Samonas
- Appietus
- Adjetey Annan
- Martha Ankomah
- Stephenie Benson
- Maame Dokono
- Coded (4X4)
- Lydia Forson
- Sandra Ankobiah
- Maame Serwaa
- Oheneyere Gifty Anti
- Paa George
- Salma Mumin
- Berla Mundi
- Oboy Salinko
- Cynthia Ampiadu
- Christabel Ekeh
- Vivian Jill
- Akua Donkor
- Emelia Brobbey
- Prophet Kumchacha
- Obaapa Christy
- Yvonne Okoro
- Adwoa Smart
- Ekow Smith Asante
- Hon. Abla Dzifa Gomashie
- Moesha Buduong
- Luckie Lawson
- Fred Amugi
- Ahuofe Patri
- Koo Fori
- Tracy Boakye
- Paulina Oduro
- KiDi
- Ama Abebrese
- Kofi B
- Sista Afua
- Wendy Shay
- Kofi Kinaata
- Shatta Michy
- Evangelist Papa Shee
- Joe Mettle
- Ellen White
- Juliet Ibrahim
- Kwami Eugene
- Evangelist Daina Asamoah
- Diana Hamilton
- Darko Vibes
- Lady Prempeh
- Becca
- Joe Shortingo
- Celestine Donkor
- Obrafour
- Akyere Bruwaa
- Adina
- Ajors
- Stella Aba Seal
- Article Wan
- Yaw Tog
- Portia Asare Boateng
- Viviennie Achor
- Kwame Afrifa Mensah
- Edem
- Bernard Aduse Poku
- Too Sweet Annan
- Kwadwo Sheldon
