= 2019 Ghana Movie Awards =

2019 event in Ghana

The 2019 Ghana Movie Awards was an event held at National Theatre on December 20, 2019. At the event, Actress Salma Mumin made history as she won her first best actress in the lead role award category. Actor Alphonse Menyo also took home his first trophy for best actor in role category. The annual award recognises excellence in the Ghana's movie industry and this was its ninth edition.

The most nominations going to Gold Coast Lounge, Away Bus, A.B.A.D and most wins awarded to Gold Coast Lounge movie and its cast.

== Awards ==
=== Production ===
Achievement In Cinematography

- Gold Coast Lounge by Isreal De-like
- Away Bus by Kelly Doe
- A.B.A.D (Feats Of Destiny) by Bernard Benson & David Okafor
- Getting Married by William Sefa Ntiamoah
- Business As Usual by Toyin Odekoya

Achievement In Costumes And Wardrobe

- Gold Coast Lounge by Vivian Adjetey
- A.B.A.D (Feats Of Destiny) by Gordon Galolo
- Getting Married by Samira Yakubu & Fauzia Yakubu
- Away Bus by Venessa Nana & Ama Odoom

Achievement In Directing

- Gold Coast Lounge by Pascal Aka Isreal De-like
- A.B.A.D (Feats Of Destiny) by Isaac Agyapong
- Getting Married by Frank Rajah Abase
- Away Bus by Peter Sedufia And Kofi Asamoah
- Business As Usual by Pascal Amanfo

Achievement In Editing (Nominees)

- Away Bus by Afra Marley & Peter Sedufia
- A.B.A.D (Feats Of Destiny) by Solomon Tamakloen And Yako Prince Osei
- Gold Coast Lounge by Kweku Kacou
- Sin City by Kobi Okyere
- Getting Married by Nicholas Agbeko

Achievement In Makeup And Hairstyling

- Getting Married by Mariam Musah
- Gold Coast Lounge by Florence Owoo
- A.B.A.D (Feats Of Destiny) by Frempong Takyi Bea & Patience Mensah
- Away Bus by Rhoda-line Ansong & Ann Marie Dzadey

Achievement In Music Written For A Movie (Original Score)

- Gold Coast Lounge by Pascal Aka
- A.B.A.D (Feats Of Destiny) by George Sedzro
- Getting Married by Berni Anti
- Business As Usual by Kobi Okyere Jr
- Away Bus by Afra Marley

Achievement In Music Written For A Movie (Original Song)

- Gold Coast Lounge music by Pascal Aka Isreal De-like, lyrics by Requel Ammah
- Getting Married music and lyrics by Berni Anti
- Away Bus music by Enoch Bleboo, lyrics by Solomon Otoo
- 40 Looks Good On You music And yrics by Stephenie Benson

Achievement In Production Design

- Gold Coast Lounge production design by Julius Elikem, set decoration by Prop Haven
- A.B.A.D (Feats Of Destiny) production Design by Gordon Galolo, set decoration by Robert Ayim
- Away Bus production design by James Avaala, set decoration by Horla Manuvor

Achievement In Visual Effects

- A.B.A.D (Feats Of Destiny) by Bra Cuojo & Jerry Debbah
- Gold Coast Lounge by Pascal Aka
- Away Bus by Peter Kojo Sampah

Achievement In Writing Adapted Or Original Screen Play

- Gold Coast Lounge screenplay by Pascal Aka
- Save The Street screenplay by Frankquophy Awuku Hanyabui
- 40 Looks Good On You screenplay by Folake Amanfo
- Business As Usual screenplay by Solake Amanfo & Randolph Obah
- Away Bus screenplay by Kofi Asamoah, Yaw Twumasi and Peter Sedufia

Best Motion Picture Of The Year

- Gold Coast Lounge produced by Esi Yeboah
- A.B.A.D (Feats Of Destiny) produced by Isaac Agyapong
- Getting Married produced by Abdul Salam Mumuni and Tony Ramesh Lachma
- Business As Usual produced by Pascal Amanfo and Selassie Ibrahim
- 40 Looks Good On You produced by Selassie Ibrahim
- Away Bus produced by Kofi Asamoah And Peter Sedufia
- Sin City produced by Yvonne Nelson
- Adoma produced by Sallam Mumuni

Best Movie African Collaboration

- Broken by Syndy Emade
- Tender Lies by Ruth Kadiri
- 40 Looks Good On You by Selassie Ibrahim

Best Short Movie

- Nirvana by William Kojo Agbeti
- Ada by James Nartey
- Election by John Agbeko

=== Acting ===
Best Actor African Collaboration

- Mike Ezuruonye in Tender Lies
- Jibola Dabo in Business As Usual
- Kunle Remi in Sin City
- Alenne Manget in Broken
- Frank Artus in Shuki

Best Actress African Collaboration

- Syndy Emade in Broken
- Rosaline Meurer in Sin City
- Uche Jombo in 40 Looks Good On You
- Ruth Kadiri Ezeraka in Tender Lies

Favorite Actor

- Van Vicker
- Majid Michel
- John Dumelo
- Prince David Osei
- James Gardiner
- Kwadwo Nkansah (Lil Win)
- Kofi Adu (Agya Koo)
- Richard Asante (Kalybos)
- Justice Hyms (Ghana Jesus)
- Akwasi Boadi (Akrobeto)
- Kwaku Manu
- Funny Face (Benson Nana Yaw Oduro Boateng)

Favorite Actress

- Joselyn Dumas
- Nana Ama McBrown
- Jackie Appiah
- Yvonne Nelson
- Yvonne Okoro
- Fella Makafui
- Lydia Forson
- Juliet Ibrahim
- Nadia Buari
- Emelia Brobbey
- Moesha Buduong
- Maame Serwaa

Performance by An Actor In A Supporting Role

- Jeffery Nortey in Adoma
- Umar Krupp in Away Bus
- Adjetey Annag in Gold Coast Lounge
- Kofi Adu in Away Bus
- Prince David Osei in A.B.A.D (Feats Of Destiny)

Performance by An Actor In A Leading Role

- Alphonse Menyo in Gold Coast Lounge
- Kofi Adjorlolo in A.B.A.D (Feats Of Destiny)
- James Gardiner in Business As Usual
- Mikki Osei Berko In Away Bus
- Qwasi Blay Jnr. In Adoma

Performance by An Actress In A Supporting Role

- Jessica Williams in A.B.A.D (Feats Of Destiny)
- Fella Makafui in Away Bus
- Kalsoume Sinare in Getting Married
- Florence Adjei in Adoma
- Zynnell Zuh in Gold Coast Lounge

Performance by An Actress In The Leading Role

- Raquel Amma in Gold Coast Lounge
- Nadia Buari, Jackie Appiah, Lydia Forson, Christabel Ekeh in Getting Married
- Yvonne Nelson in Sin City
- Salma Mumin in Away Bus
- Selassie Ibrahim, Uche Jombo, Roselyn Ngissah, Stephenie Benson, Shassy Bello in 40 Looks Good On You

Discovery Of The Year

- Raquel Ammah in Gold Coast Lounge
- Cina Soul in Gold Coast Lounge
- Ophelia Doefia in Save The Street
- Florence Adjei in Adoma
- Rosy Meurer in Sin City
- Qwasi Blay Jnr. in Adoma
