= 2021 Ghana Movie Awards =

Ghanaian film awards

The 2021 Ghana movie awards took place on 30th December 2021. It was the 11th edition of the Ghana movie awards.

== Nominations ==
Movies such as Borga, Sugar, Savannah, Coming To Africa, Cross, Shemale, The Therapist, Cold Road and Famous was nominated for various awards. Actors and actresses such as Anthony Woode, Anwar Jamison, Eugene Boateng, Kwadwo Osei Tutu and Jasmine Baroudi, Ashley Oluigbo, Nadia Buari, Kwaku Brown, Sherifatu Issah and many others were nominated for various categories.

== Winners ==
The bolded names in each of the following categories of awards were the winners for the 2021 Ghana movie awards.

=== Visual effects ===
- Sugar – Lynx Entertainment Ghana
- **Cross** – **Michael Narh**
- Uncharted – Kwadwo Osei Tutu
- SAVANNAH – Afra Marley and Richard Ato Imbeah
- BORGA – Jude Arnold Kurankyi and Andreas Engelhardj

=== Production design ===
- **BORGA** – **Production Design by Anthony Tomety and set decoration by Tanja Arlt**
- UNCHARTED PATH – Production Design by Danie Baah and set decoration by Danie Baah
- SAVANNAH – Production Design by Godwin Mensah and set decoration by Godwin Mensah
- CROSS – Production Design by Brown Kukua Richard and set decoration by Brown Kukua Richard
- COMING TO AFRICA – Production design by Salamatu Adamu and set decoration by Salamatu Adamu

=== Make up and hairstyling ===
- UNCHARTED PATH – Priscilla Hanson
- BORGA – Rita Essah
- **SAVANNAH** – **Forreal Joe Mensah**
- SUGAR – Lynx Entertainment
- SHEMALE – Seyen Beauty

=== A performance by an actor in a leading role ===
- Kwadwo Osei Tutu – UNCHARTED PATH
- Eugene Boateng – BORGA
- **Anthony Woode** – **SAVANNAH**
- Anwar Jamison – COMING TO AFRICA
- Qwasi Blay Jnr. – CROSS

=== A performance by an actress in a leading role ===
- Habiba Sinare – SAVANNAH
- Dela Seade – FAMOUS
- Jasmine Baroudi – THE THERAPIST
- Ashley Oluigbo – UNCHARTED PATH
- **Nadia Buari** – **SHEMALE**

=== A performance by an actor in a supporting role ===
- **Adjetey Annag** – **BORGA**
- Khalil Khain – COMING TO AFRICA
- Jeffrey Nortey – THE THERAPIST
- Nana Yeboah, Ebenezer Forson – SHEMALE
- Jude Arnold – BORGA

=== A performance by an actress in a supporting role ===
- Selassie Ibrahim – FAMOUS
- Kalsoiume Sinare – SAVANNAH
- Roselyn Ngissah – UNCHARTED PATH
- **Lydia Forson** – **BORGA**
- Nana Ama MacBrown – COMING TO AFRICA

=== Costume and wardrobe ===
- SAVANNAH – Samira Yakubu and Fauzia Yakubu
- BORGA – KAYDA NANA AFRIYIE FRIMPONG AND HENRIKE LUR
- **UNCHARTED PATH** – **ASHLEY OLUIGBO**
- CROSS – Amaechi Samuel Agu
- COMING TO AFRICA – Austugstina Twumasi

=== Directing ===
- SAVANNAH – Kobi Rana
- COMING TO AFRICA – Anwar Jamison
- UNCHARTED PATH – Kwadwo Osei Tutu and Gloria Ampofo
- **BORGA** – York – **Fabian Paable**
- THE THERAPEUTIC – Pascal Amanfo

=== Editing ===
- FAMOUS – Richard Ato Imbeah
- BORGA – Bobby Good, Kaya Inan and Edd Maggs
- COMING TO AFRICA – Anwar Jamison
- **UNCHARTED PATH** – **Kwadwo Osei Tutu**
- SAVANNAH – Afra Marley and Richard Ato Imbeah

=== Music (original song) ===
- **SUGAR** – **KiDi**
- BORGA – Sarkodie /Tomer Moked
- UNCHARTED PATH – Eugenio Minnini
- SHEMALE – Berni Anti
- COMING TO AFRICA – Stonebwoy

=== Music (original score) ===
- SAVANNAH – George Sedzro
- UNCHARTED PATH – Eugenio Minnini
- THE THERAPIST – Berni Anti
- COMIMG TO AFRICA – Kirk Smith
- **BORGA** – **Tomer Moked** and **Ben Lukas Boyson**

=== Sound mixing and editing ===
- COMING TO AFRICA – Terry Poindexter and Cephas Asamamy
- **UNCHARTRD PATH** – **Peter Avettey**
- BORGA – Floyd Furstenau Robin Harfe and Paul Powaljew
- THE THERAPIST – Berni Anti
- CROSS – James Adofo

=== Writing adapted or original screen play ===
- SAVANNAH – Jemila Suleman
- BORGA – Toks Korner and Fabian Raabe
- **UNCHARTED PATH** – **Ashley Oluigbo**
- THE THERAPIST – Pascal Amanfo
- CROSS – Kwaku Dua Prempeh

=== Cinematography ===
- THE THERAPIST – Isaac Kwame Awuah
- UNCHARTED PATH – Decosta Agyemang Dua
- **BORGA** – **Tobias Von Dem Borne**
- SAVANNAH – Leonard Atawugah Kudaloe (OBL)
- COMING TO AFRICA – Ellis Fowle

=== Best picture ===
- **BORGA** – **Danny Damah** and **Tony Tagoe**
- SUGAR – Dennis Dwanenah and Richard Mensah
- SAVANNAH – Abdul Mumin Salam and Tony Lachman
- COMING TO AFRICA – Py Addo Boateng
- CROSS – Evander Kwame Agyemang
- SHEMALE – Samuel Degraft Yeboah
- THE THERAPIST – Abdul Mumin Salam
- COLD ROAD – Francis Agbetsoamedo
- FAMOUS – Abdul Mumin Salam
- UNCHARTED PATH – Ashley Oluigbo and Kwadwo Osei Tutu

=== Discovery ===
- Ann Sophie Ave – FIRE AND ICE
- **Eugene Boateng** – **BORGA**
- Dennis Dwanenah (KIDI) – SUGAR
- Py Addo Boateng – COMING TO AFRICA
- Ashley Oluigbo – UNCHARTED PATH
- Nana Yeboah – SHEMALE
- Jude Arnold – BORGA
- Andy Tetteh – HOG TIE
- Kwaku Brown – COMING TO AFRICA
- Sherifatu Issah – SAVANNAH

=== Short movie ===
- PERCEPTION – Alphonse Menyo
- A DAY LIKE OCTOBER – Habiba Sinare
- ACROSS THE BORDER – Destiny
- VALENTINE – Kobi Okyere Rana
- 30 DAYS – Basira Mohammed
- **FORT PRINZENSTEIN** – **Kekeli Quashigah**

=== Best animation ===
- I'M LIVING IN GHANA GET ME OUT OF HERE – Comfort Arthur
- **THE UNDERESTIMATED VILLAN** – **Comfort Arthur**
- GOLD WATER – Divine Jones

=== Best documentary ===
- WATER IS LIFE – Kojo Appiah-Kubi
- GHANA – Akwasi Poku
- **CITY OF BUKOM** – **Scilla Owusu**
- UNVEILING – Kuukua Eshun

=== Favourite actresses ===
- Gloria Sarfo
- Maame Serwaa
- Tracey Boakye
- Mercy Asiedu
- Emelia Brobbey
- Vivian Jill Lawrence
- **Nana Ama McBrown**
- Nadia Buari
- Yvonne Nelson
- Yvonne Okoro
- Jackie Appiah
- Kalsoume Sinare
- Joselyn Dumas
- Martha Ankomah
- Lydia Forson
- Juliet Ibrahim

=== Favourite actor ===
- **Adjetey Anang**
- Majid Michel
- Van Vicker
- John Dumelo
- Anthony Woode
- Prince David Osei
- James Gardiner
- Richard Asante (KALYBOS)
- Kwadwo Nkansah (LIL WAYNE)
- Akwesi Boadi (AKROBETO)
- Kwaku Manu
- Clemento Ashiteye (SUAREZ)
- Benso Boateng (FUNNY FACE)
- Yaw Dabo
- Bill Asamoah
- Kofi Adu (AGYA KOO)
- Ebenezer Akwasi Antwi (RAS NENE)
