= List of Ghanaian films of 2018 =

This is a list of Ghanaian films released in 2018.

Title	Director	Cast (Subject of documentary)	Genre	Notes	Release date
Getting Over Him	Desmond Elliot	Majid Michel			
Sidechic Gang		Nana Ama McBrown, Lydia Forson, Adjetey Anang, Sika Osei, Bernard Nyarko, Akorfa Edjeane, Eddie Kufuor, Christabel Ekeh, Kobina Sam			3 March
Apples and Bananas	Kobi Rana	Fela Makafui. Moesha Buduong, Afia Odo, Kobi Rana, Too Sweet Annan			14 February
Potato Pohtato		Adjetey Anang, Kafui Danku, Victoria Michaels, Joselyn Dumas, OC Okuje, Chris Attoh, Nikki Samonas, Joke Silva, Lala Akindoju, Blossom Chukwujekwu			
Chaskele	Kobi Rana	Kobi Rana, Lil Wayne, Kalsoume Sinare, Bernard Nyarko, Lawyer Nti			14 April
The King With No Culture		Jessica Williams, Emmanuel France, Elikem Kumordzie, Jordan Adorwalo, Vicky Zugah, Don K Yamoah, Umar Krup, Nana Yaa Agyare, Princess Mimi Bala, Hogan Gabriel, Joyce Potugal			
That Night		Kofi Adjorlolo			
Getting Over Him	Desmond Elliot	Majid Michel, Deyemi Okanlawon, Matilda Obaseki, Bimbo Ademoye			
Baabani		Kalsoume Sinare, Fred Amugi, Roselyn Ngissah, Sawudatu Asibi Admas, Eman Sinare, Samuel Bravo, Salma Mumin, Peter Richie, Umar Krupp			
David Ne Goliath		Lil Wayne			
English Teacher		Nana Ama McBrown			
