= Kofi Asamoah =

Ghanaian director, writer, and film producer

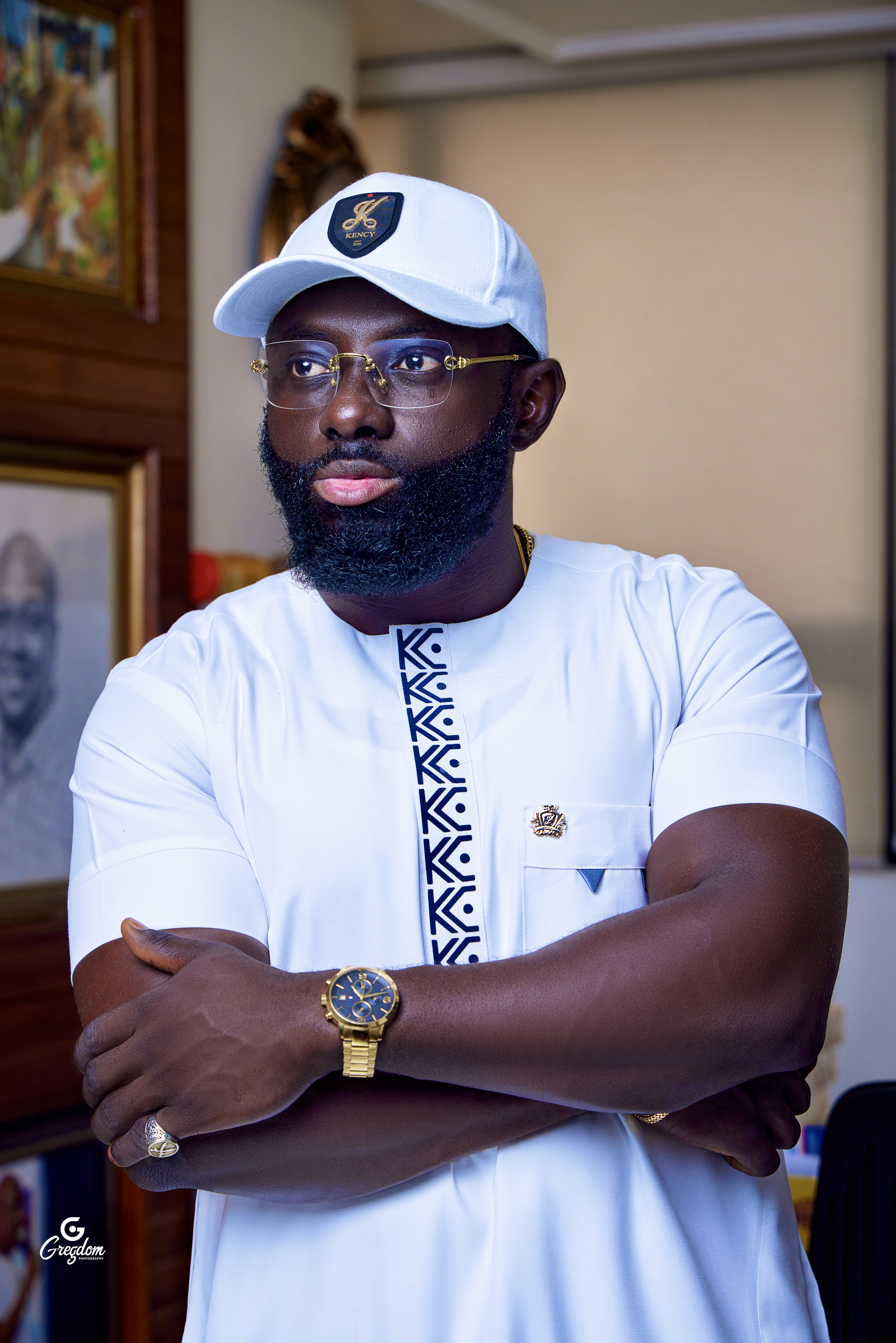
- Born: Kofi Asamoah; 27 March 1985 (age 41); Assin Anyinabrem, Ghana
- Education: Mfantsipim School, National Film and Television Institute, Ghana Institute of Journalism, New York Film Academy
- Occupations: Filmmaker, creative director, writer and entrepreneur
- Years active: 2009–present
- Notable work: Amakye and Dede, Away Bus, John and John, Kalybos in China

Kofi Asamoah, also known as Kofas, is a Ghanaian award-winning film director, writer, film producer and entrepreneur. He is the CEO and creative director of Kofas Media, a film, television and advertising production company.

== Early life ==
Asamoah was born in Assin Anyinabrem in Ghana's Central region, but grew up mostly in Takoradi in the Western Region of Ghana, where he had his basic and primary education at the Young Christian Preparatory School. He had his secondary education at Mfantsipim School, where he was a member of the school's national debating team.

He started his tertiary education at the University of Ghana, Legon. As his career in filmmaking got started, he proceeded to the National Film and Television Institute, where he graduated with a bachelor's degree in Film and Television Production with a major in Film Directing. Asamoah then joined Ghana Institute of Journalism, where he attained a master's degree in Public Relations. He later moved to the US, where he studied filmmaking at the New York Film Academy.

== Career ==
Asamoah started out professionally as a news reporter with Skyy Power FM/TV, where he became the voice of their reality show. In 2009, he ventured into filmmaking in Kumasi. He scripted and produced his first content in 2012, titled Boys Kasa (comic series) featuring Kalybos. This eventually shot him into the Ghanaian movie industry.

Asamoah has produced and directed several Ghanaian films, including Area Boys (2011); Kalybos in China (2015); John and John (2017); and Amakye and Dede, a 2016 film that featured Majid Michel, John Dumelo and Salma Mumin and won Best Movie of the Year Award (Ghana) at City People Entertainment Awards 2016.

Asamoah won Best Movie Director at the 2016 City People Entertainment Awards.

== Filmography ==
Year	Film	Role
2008	Brain Sex (short)	Director, producer
2008	Opambour	Writer, producer, director
2010	Danger	Producer, director
2010	Nyame Ay3 Me Bone	Writer, producer, director
2010	Oh! Uncle Atta	Writer, producer, director
2011	Area Boys	Director, producer
2015	Kalybos in China	Director, producer, writer
2016	Amakye and Dede (comic)	Producer, director
2017	John and John	Producer, director
2019	Away Bus	Producer, director, writer

== TV series ==
- Eye Red
- Noko Fio
- Pa2Pa
- Papa Kumasi
- Bombo Clinic
- Cow and Chicken
- Guy Guy (director)
- Cocoa Brown

== Awards and nominations ==
Year	Award ceremony	Prize	Result	Ref
2016	City People Entertainment Awards	Best Movie Director of the Year (Ghana)	Won	
2016	Ghana Movie Awards	Best Director for Amakye and Dede	Nominated	
2019	Ghana Entertainment Awards USA	Best Director (Film)	Won	
