= Amakye and Dede =

Ghanaian film

- Directed by: Kofi Asamoah.
- Starring: Salma Mumin; John Dumelo; Roselyn Ngissah
- Release date: 2016
- Country: Ghana

Amakye and Dede is a Ghanaian romantic comedy movie released in 2016 and directed by Kofi Asamoah. The movie is centered on two best friends who fell in love with the same girl. The film sold the most tickets on the date it was premiered. The movie was themed as the “Easter Movie” because it was premiered during Easter on 26 March, 2016 at the Silverbirds Cinemas West Hills Mall and Accra Mall.

== Cast ==
- Majid Michel
- Kalybos (Richard Asante)
- Ahuofi Patri
- John Dumelo
- Roselyn Ngissah
- Salma Mumin
- Umar Krupp
- Emelia Brobbey
- Moesha Buduong
- Grace Nortey
- Fred Nuamah
- Samuel Yaw Dabo
- Jackson Davis
- Horla Manuvor
- Priscilla Opoku
- Kobi Rana

== Reception ==
Ghana Film Industry gave the film a 9.5 out of 10.
