= AJ DaHottest =

Ghanaian-Liberian musician and radio personality

- Born: Augustine Odortey Akrong; 8 October 1981; Liberia
- Origin: Tema, Ghana
- Genres: Afropop, Hip hop, Ghanaian hip hop
- Occupations: Rapper; singer-songwriter; DJ and radio personality

AJ DaHottest (born Augustine Odortey Akrong aka Augustine Jebor) is a Ghanaian-Liberian rapper, singer-songwriter, DJ, and radio personality at YFM Ghana where he hosts the Shouts On Y show. He is recognized in the Ghanaian entertainment industry for his energetic blend of Afropop and hip hop style music played on his shows. Born in Liberia to Ghanaian parents, his family relocated to Ghana when he was young during the peak of the First Liberian Civil War and has since become a versatile entertainer known for his work both behind the microphone and on the airwaves in Ghana.

== Early life ==
AJ DaHottest was born in Liberia to Ghanaian roots, his mother and father are respectively known as Agatha Akua Afram and Sowah Akrong. Like many young Ghanaians of his generation, he drew inspiration from global hip hop icons, particularly American rapper Tupac Shakur, during his early years.

AJ DaHottest's Musical style fuses contemporary Afropop with elements of hip hop and Ghanaian hiplife. He later became active in Ghana's entertainment industry, where he has built his career as a musician and radio presenter.

== Education ==
For his education, AJ DaHottest attended Asuansi Technical Institute in Cape Coast, the capital of the Cape Coast Metropolitan District and the Central Region of Ghana. From there he also studied at Kumasi Polytechnic, now known as Kumasi Technical University.

== Career ==
AJ DaHottest began his career as a radio personality, working with stations such as Luv FM in Kumasi from 2005 to 2006, Hitz FM in Accra from 2006 to 2011 after which he went on a hiatus to focus on music. He transitioned into music as a rapper and songwriter, gaining attention in the mid-2010s with several releases under the support of Taylor Brown Entertainment Promotions & Entertainment LLC (TBE).

His breakthrough moments came with tracks such as Tsieyoo Meni Yaanor (2015), an upbeat party song that became an online hit and later received a music video.

=== Return to radio ===
After focusing primarily on music for several years, AJ DaHottest made a successful return to radio. In October 2020, he joined YFM (Y 107.9 FM) in Accra, where he was brought on board by hiplife legend and Programs Manager Eddie Blay Jr.

He began hosting the weekend show titled The A.M. LockDown, an interactive program dedicated to hip hop, rap, and hiplife music. As of 2023 and beyond, AJ has continued his association with YFM where he hosts "Shouts on Y" from Monday to Friday at 12:00 P.M. to 3:00 PM. He has since 2016 been managed by Ghanaian-American publicist Oral Ofori.

=== Celebrity interviews on radio ===
AJ DaHottest over the years interviewed a number of celebrities on radio, some of which include:

- DKB Ghana
- Kwaw Kese
- Sarkodie (rapper)
- Edem (rapper)
- Wanlov the Kubolor
- D'banj
- Ramsey Nouah
- Suran (K-Pop)

== Discography ==
=== Notable singles ===
AJ DaHottest on April 20, 2014, released his first single titled '"You & I"' that featured renowned Ghanaian musician Trigmatic and upcoming Ghanaian rapper AKO. Since then, several other singles and collabs have followed over the years, some of which include:

- "You & I" (featuring Trigmatic & AKO) (2014)
- "Tsi3yoo Mini Yaano" (2015)
- "Benkemormi" (2016)
- "Wake Up" (2016)
- "Stay In Your Lane" (2017)
- "Say No More" (featuring Gold Star 2017)
- "Pressure" C Craft (featuring AJ DaHottest 2022)

== Personal life ==
AJ DaHottest maintains an active social media presence, particularly on Facebook, TikTok and Instagram all under the handle @ajdahottest. He continues to balance his music career with radio work and occasional DJ performances. He is known among friends and colleagues for his resilience and never-give-up attitude. He is presently married to Kate Adutwumwaa Ansah and they have a daughter.
