= 2024 Ghana Movie Awards =

Ghanaian film awards

The 2024 Ghana Movie Awards was Saturday, 18 January 2025 at the Accra International Conference Centre (AICC). It was the 14th edition of the Ghana Movie Awards. There were 21 awards presented in various categories such as Achievement in Cinematography, Achievement in Directing, Achievement in Editing, Achievement in Costume and Wardrobe, Production Design and Achievement in Sound Mixing and Editing.

== Nominations ==
Nomination was set to close on 5 November 2024. The following nominees was announced by the Organizers of the Ghana Movie Awards for the 21 awards categories.

=== Achievement in Cinematography ===
1. Kadara – Joshua Nii Dromo
2. Taste of sin – Tunde Adekoya
3. A country called Ghana – Evander Kwame Agyemang
4. Pawn – Bamie Lammeh
5. Widow's gift – Samuel Anakwa

==== Achievement in Directing ====
1. Taste of sin – Frank Rajah Arase
2. If God is African – Pascal Amanfo
3. Pawn – Pascal Aka
4. A country called Ghana– Frank Gharbin
5. Widow's gift – Juliet Ibrahim

===== Achievement in Editing =====
1. Pawn – George Lammeh/ Enoch Bentil
2. Taste of sin – Afra Marley
3. Widow's Gift – Vincent Abayateya Eduaba
4. Kadara – Enoch William Taky
5. A country called Ghana – Walker Bentil Boateng

====== Achievement in Costume and Wardrobe ======
1. A country called Ghana – Kwame amoako
2. Kadara – Kofi Mulah
3. Galamsey. – Benjamin Sarpong
4. Taste of sin – Fauzia Yakubu
5. Pawn. – Belinda Abena Adoma/ Deniece Annor Apo

====== Achievement in make – up and hairstyling ======
1. A country called Ghana – Esther Barkoh and Ama Beauty
2. Galamsey. – Kingsley Dwomoh
3. Forever in a night – Maame Adwoa
4. Big six. – Justice osei
5. Pawn – Feliz Carl Hagoa

====== Music original score ======
1. Taste of sin – Berni Anti
2. Pawn. – Richie Mensah
3. A country called Ghana – Derex Nado
4. Galamsey. – Affra Marley
5. Widow's gift – Vincent Abayateya Eduaba

====== Production design ======
1. A country called Ghana – Issifu Ania Quena
2. Taste of sin – Andre Alain Bourrean
3. Galamsey. – Benjamin Sarpong
4. Kadara – Yellow Man
5. Pawn – Baaba Amoaba

====== Music original song ======
1. Kadara – Radiya Sinare
2. Taste of sin – Berni Anti
3. A country called Ghana – Rexford Fosuhene/ Rosa Reinh
4. Widow's gift – Nektunex
5. Galamsey – Nana Asantewaa

====== Achievement in sound mixing and editing ======
1. Kadara – Enoch Williem Takyi
2. Taste of sin – Berni Anti
3. A country called Ghana – Amoah Nyame
4. Pawn – Richie Mensah
5. Widow's gift – Vincent Abayateya Eduaba

====== Achievement in writing original or adapted screenplay ======
1. Taste of sin. – Pascal Amanfo
2. Pawn – Portia Owusu
3. Galamsey – Addison Lawrence
4. Kadara – Maxmore Bakare/Kyei Baffour
5. A country called Ghana – Nicholas Kwarteng

====== Best Short movies ======
1. Mind Chess – Louis Lamis
2. At all cost – Kenny Daniel
3. Afoley – Nii Odai Afotey
4. Aahi. – Nana Kofi Asihene
5. Audiger – 2. – Meejed Buari

===== Best Documentary =====
1. The nexus between climate induced
2. Sir James
3. Global
4. School

==== Best actor African collaboration ====
1. Jim Ike – Zongo boys
2. Deyami okanlawon. – Red Carpet
3. Ramsey Nouah/Victor Osuagwu Charles Awurum – A Country called Ghana
4. Gideon Okeke – Tokunbo
5. Chidi Mokeme – Tokunbo
6. David Ezekiel – Blood vessel

==== Best actress African collaboration ====
1. Adaobi Dibor – Blood vessel
2. Funlola Aofiuebi Raimi – Tokunbo
3. Syndy Emade – Red carpet
4. Anita Fabiola – Red carpet
5. Uzoamaka Aniunoh – Weekend

==== Best movie African collaboration ====
1. Tokunbo – Ramsey Nouah
2. Red carpet – Samira Yakubu
3. Blood vessel – Agozie Ugwu
4. A country called Ghana – Kwadwo Nkansah(lilwin)
5. Weekend – Uche Okocha

=== Best picture ===
1. Red carpet – Samira Yakubu
2. Taste of sin – Samira Yakubu and Dominion TV
3. If God is African – Pascal Amanfo
4. A country called Ghana – Kwadwo nkansah(lilwin)
5. Pawn – Nana Agyeiwaa Adofo
6. Galamsey – Benjamin Sarpong
7. Widow's gift. – Juliet Ibrahim
8. Kadara. – Habiba Sinare

=== Cameo actor ===
1. Taste of sin – Archbishop Nicholas

==== A performance by an actor in a leading role ====
1. Kwadwo nkansah(lilwin) – A Country called Ghana
2. James Gardiner – Taste of sin
3. Adjetey Anang – Pawn
4. Anthony Woode – Kadara
5. Jeffery Nortey. – Edge of emotions

==== Performance by an actress in a leading role ====
1. Nadia Buari – Forever in a night
2. Jackie Appiah – Red carpet
3. Bless Fortune – If God is African
4. Nana Ama Mcbrown – Galamsey
5. Emelia Brobbey – Big six
6. Habiba Sinare – Kadara

===== A performance by an actor in a supporting role =====
1. John Dumelo. – Blood vessel
2. Kofi Adjololo – Kadara
3. Van Vicker. – Galamsey
4. Majid Michel – Taste of sin
5. Clement Bonney (Mr Beautiful) – Zongo Boys

===== A performance by an actress in a supporting role =====
1. Sonia Ibrahim – Taste of sin
2. Roselyn Ngissah
3. Sandra Ababio
4. Christabel ekeh – Red Carpet
5. Tracy Boakye – Gyebi
6. Kalsoume Sinare – Zongo Boys
7. Maame Ofosuah Anim. – Widow's gift
8. Sika Dzuali – Widow's gift
9. Chichi neblett – Widow's gift
10. . Sonia ibrahim – Widow's gift

====== Discovery of the year ======
1. Rosemond Brown(Akuapim Poloo) – widow's gift
2. Frank Ntiamoah – Gyebi
3. Mawena Azumah. – Mind chess
4. Martina Dwamenq(Asantewaa) – Bruna
5. Sherita Adu – Big six
6. Quesh – Country called Ghana
7. Augustina Aboabo – Bix Six

== Winners ==
The following people won the awards of the 21 categories for the 2024 Ghana Movie Awards.

Achievement in Production Design – A Country Called Ghana by Issifu Ania Quena

Achievement In MakeUp & Hairstyling – Big Six by Justice Osei

Achievement in Costume & Wardrobe – A Country Called Ghana by Kwame Amoako

Music Original Song – Kadaraby Rhadiya Sinare

Achievement In Song Mixing & Editing – Pawn by Richie Mensah

Achievement In Cinematography – Pawn by Bamie lammeh

Achievement in Writing Original or Adapted Screenplay – Red Carpet by Pascal Amanfo

Achievement In Editing – A Taste of Sin By Afra Marley

Discovery of the Year – It was a tie between Rosemond Brown (Widow's Gift) & Quesh (A Country Called Ghana) Best Documentary – The Nexus Between Climate Induced

Best Short Movies – It was a tie between Afoley by Nii Odai Afotey & Aahi by Nana Kofi Asihene

Cameo Actor – A Taste of Sin by Archbishop Nicholas Duncan Williams

Best Movie African Collaboration – Tokunbo by Ramsy Nouah

Best Actor African Collaboration – Gideon Okeke (Tokunbo)

Achievement In Directing – Juliet Ibrahim (Widow's Gift)

Best Actress African Collaboration – Adaobi Dibo (Blood Vessel)

Best Performance by lead Actor in a Drama/ Comedy Series – Barrister NGO (Kejetia Verses Makola)

Best Performance by lead Actress in a Drama/ Comedy Series – Nana Ama Ampofo (Yolo Season 7)

Performance by Actress in a Supportive Role for Drama/ Comedy Series – Aba K. Dadson (Yolo Season 7)

Performance by Actor in a Supportive Role for Drama/ Comedy Series – Ato Dadzie aka Barrister Amekuzi (Kejetia Versus Makola) Performance by an Actress in a Supporting Role – Roselyn Ngissah (Red Carpet)

Performance by an Actor in a Supporting Role – Hon. John Dumelo (Blood Vessel)

Performance by an Actor in a Leading Role – It was a tie between James Gardiner (Taste of Sin) & Adjetey Anang (Pawn)

Performance by an Actress in a Leading Role – Jackie Appiah (Red Carpet)

Best Picture – A Taste of Sin (Samira Yakubu & Dominion TV)

Outstanding African Actor – Jim Iyke

Outstanding Producer – Roger Quartey

Outstanding TV Series Actor – Mikky Osei Beko

Outstanding Executive Producer – Augustina Abbey

Outstanding Producer & Distributor Ghana – Miracle Films

Outstanding Script Writer – Socrate Safo

Outstanding Movie Actor – David Dontoh

Outstanding Movie Actress – Grace Omabo

Outstanding Casting Director – Mawuoko Kuadzi

Outstanding Executive Producer – Alhaji Salam Mumuni

Outstanding Variety Show – Showtime with Nana McBrown (Onua TV)

Outstanding TV Show – United Showbiz (UTV)

Blogger of the Year – * ZionFelix

Favourite Movie Actress of the Year – Nana Ama McBrown

Favourite Movie Actor of the Year – Clemento Suarez
