= William Sefa =

Ghanaian Cinematographer

William Sefa Ntiamoah is a Ghanaian Cinematographer.

== Awards ==
Nominee for Achievement in Cinematography with the movie Getting Married and DÉJÀ VU under cinematography nomination list at the Ghana Movie Awards.

== Filmography ==
Cinematographer
Film	Year
Chronicles of Adukrom:The Headmaster	2015
Yaa Asantewaa:The Spirit of Ashanti Nation	2008
Yaa and the Kingdom of Gold	2001

Camera
Film	Year
Ritual of Fires	2001
Hopes on the Horizon (Documentary)	1998
Cobra Verde	1987
