= Akim Swedru Senior High School =

Mixed second cycle institution in Ghana

Coordinates: 5.89050°N 1.02457°W

Akim Swedru Senior High
- Eastern Region; Ghana

Information
- Motto: Perseverance brings Success
- Established: 1970; 56 years ago
- School district: Birim South

Akim Swedru Senior High School, also known as AKISSS, is a co-educational senior high school located south of Akim Swedru, the capital of the Birim South District, a district in the Eastern Region of Ghana. Students and Old Students of the School are referred to as ANUANOM . Akisss is one of the few schools in Ghana that had benefited from the Japan Overseas cooperation volunteers program [JOCV-JICA]

== History ==
Established in 1946 as a Teacher training college, the college was later converted into a Secondary School in October 1970.

== Programs offered ==
Below are academic programs offered in the school:

- Agric science
- Business
- General arts
- General science
- Home economics
- Visual arts

== Headteachers ==
- Mr. G. A. Frempong
- Mr. C. O. Kwakye
- Mr. Gyaba Mensah
- Rev. Abraham Osei Donkor
- Mr. Michael Danwono
- Mrs. Ama Asamoah

== Notable alumni ==
- Mr. Kwasi Kwaning-Bosompem, Controller and Accountant General Ghana
- Emelia Brobbey, actress, television presenter and musician
- Pap Jay, radio presenter and media personality with YFM Kumasi.

== See also ==
- Education in Ghana
- List of schools in Ghana
