= Kalybos in China =

2016 Ghanaian film

Kalybos In China
- Directed by: Kofi Asamoah (Kofas)
- Produced by: Kofi Asamoah (Kofas)
- Release date: 2016
- Country: Ghana
- Language: English

Kalybos in China is a Ghanaian comedy film where the main character, Kalybos, does anything for his true love, Ahuofe Partri. Kalybose goes to China to make more money. He is assisted by a connected man with acquiring the particulars necessary for traveling there.

== Cast ==
- Kalybos
- Priscilla Agyemang (Ahuofe Patri)
- Christabel Ekeh
- David Dontoh
- Jeneral Ntatia
- Mikki Osei Berko
- Nikki Samonas
- John Dumelo
- Jose Tolbert
