= Nuamah =

Nuamah is an Asante surname. Notable people with the surname include:

- Ernest Nuamah (born 2003), Ghanaian footballer
- Fred Nuamah (born 1975), Ghanaian actor
- Patrick Nuamah (born 2005), Italian footballer
- Samiu Kwadwo Nuamah (fl. 2015), Ghanaian academic
- Samuel Nuamah Donkor (1958–2022), Ghanaian politician
- Stephen Nuamah Mensah (born 1914), Ghanaian politician
- Christine Amoako-Nuamah (born 1944), Ghanaian scientist
- Kwabena Twum-Nuamah (born 1978), Ghanaian politician
