= Broken Mirror (film) =

Ghanaian film

- Directed by: Mikki Osei Berko
- Written by: Pappa Deric
- Produced by: David Owusu
- Starring: Jackie Appiah; Fred Amugi; James Gardiner
- Production company: Media 5 Studio Productions
- Release date: 2014
- Country: Ghana

Broken Mirror is a Ghanaian movie that was released in 2014 by Media 5 Studio Productions. It is written by Pappa Deric and produced by David Owusu with Mikki Osei Berko as the director. It is a story of a woman who gets jilted when her boyfriend's fortune changes for the better, after standing by him through the hard times.

== Plot ==
Thompson played by James Gardiner, is an unemployed university graduate who takes up carpentry in the hustle to survive. His lover Priscilla (Jackie Appiah) provided him emotional and financial support. Priscilla who is not rich and works as a seamstress, is always being bashed by her colleagues Evelyn (Roselyn Ngissah) and Angela (Victoria Lebene Mekpah) because of her love and unflinching support for Thompson. Her faith in him becoming successful in God's time is very strong and he does within a year.

They get married, are happy and expecting their first child, when Thompson receives pictures that show Priscilla with another man. This gives him the impression that she is cheating and leads to the collapse of the marriage. Evelyn introduces her boyfriend to Priscilla at some point. She somehow believes Priscilla stole him and he is the one in the pictures with her.

== Cast ==
- James Gardiner
- Mikki Osei Berko
- Fred Amugi
- Jackie Appiah
- Roselyn Ngissah
- Victoria Lebene Mekpah
- Jasmine Baroudi

== Reception ==
The movie was given a 50% rating by Nollywood Reinvented.
