= Joni Waka =

Ghanaian Film

- Directed by: Van Vicker
- Written by: Van Vicker
- Produced by: Van Vicker
- Production company: Sky Orange Productions
- Release date: 2012
- Country: Ghana
- Language: English

Joni Waka is a Ghanaian movie directed and written by Van Vicker in 2012. The movie was Van Vicker's first movie in Twi.

== Synopsis ==
Joni Waka goes back to his village because he has made a discovery about his homeland. He had a plan and just how to get it was a bit stressful but his unofficial guide Paa Nii who is the village eye, gets things complicated. Meanwhile, the innkeeper's wife expresses her affection for Joni and bullies any lady who gets closer to Joni. Joni also was the love of many women in the village.

== Cast ==
- Van Vicker as Joni Waka
- Agya Koo as Paa Nii
- Papa Sorfo as Chief
- Fanny Fay Akaaminko as Princess
- Kingsley Opoku Agyepong as Prince
- Adwoa Vicker
- Nikoletta Samonas
- Alex ‘Bomaye’ Biney
- CK Akunnor
