= Pap Jay =

Ghanaian radio presenter and media personality

James Yebuah Mensah
- Born: James Yebuah Mensah; Ghana
- Other names: Pap Jay
- Education: Akim Swedru Secondary School
- Alma mater: University of Ghana, KNUST School of Business
- Occupations: Radio presenter, media personality
- Known for: Hosting the Mid-Morning Radio Show on YFM Kumasi
- Notable work: Pap Jay and Friends

James Yebuah Mensah known professionally as Pap Jay, is a Ghanaian radio presenter and media personality. He is the host of the Mid-Morning Radio Show on YFM Kumasi in Ghana’s Ashanti Region. In 2022, he founded “Pap Jay and Friends,” a community initiative that has organized projects including the refurbishment of the Mother and Baby Unit at Asante-Mampong General Hospital and a feeding program for street children in Kumasi in 2023.

== Early life and education ==
Mensah attended Akim Swedru Secondary School in Ghana’s Eastern Region, where he studied General Arts. He later earned a degree in Geography and Resource Development from the University of Ghana, Legon, and an MBA in Marketing and Strategic Management from the KNUST School of Business.

== Career ==
Mensah began his professional work in sports punditry before transitioning into radio broadcasting. He became host of the Mid-Morning Radio Show on YFM Kumasi, adopting the on-air name Pap Jay, which combines his childhood nickname “Papa Nii” and his given name, James. In 2022, he founded Pap Jay and Friends, a programme that combines social events with community fundraising. Its first event, the “Kenkey Edition,” raised funds for the construction of a 20-bed Mother and Baby Unit at the Asante-Mampong General Hospital. That same year, the initiative provided meals to 200 street children in Kumasi. In 2023, it organised the “Bronya Nkwan” event at Greenwood Event Centre, feeding over 500 street children.
