= Dada Boat =

Dada Boat is a television programme that shows daily on Original Black Entertainment TV (OBE). It has some similarities to Taxi Driver, another popular Ghanaian programme.

== Setting ==
The story is set in Accra, Ghana, where a young man named Dada Boat, played by Mikki Osei Berko, is involved in various comical situations and scams. The comedy in Dada Boat arises from his attempt to imitate African-American hip-hop culture, which is somewhat frowned upon by the Ghanaian locals. He oftentimes wear jewelries, particularly a big Necklace and other pieces. His best friend is Hotman, who is also a character in the programme. Although the story is fictional, it has a real life setting, unlike other programmes, which are often recorded on specially made sets. Dada Boat is a relative of the character in Taxi Driver known as "Master Richard". They are both played by the Ghanaian actor Mikki Osei Berko.
