= Osei Kyeretwie Senior High School =

Boarding school in Ashanti Region, Ghana

Location
- Tafo-Kumasi, Ashanti Region; Ghana
- 6.7429°N 1.6164°W

Information
- Established: 1937; 89 years ago
- Headmaster: Frederick Keelson-Aikins
- Gender: Co-educational
- Age: 14 to 18
- Enrollment: 2,652
- Colors: Green and white
- Nickname: OKESS
- Website: okess.edu.gh

Osei Kyeretwie Senior High School is a coed boarding school in Kumasi, Ashanti Region, Ghana.

== History ==
Osei Kyeretwie Senior High school (known as OKESS) was established in July 1937 as the first secondary school in the Asante region. The school, formerly known as Asante Collegiate started as a private educational institution with just a handful of all boys’ students by the late Rev. J. T. Roberts. After many years of private management, the school was taken over by the ministry of education in September, 1958; relocated it to Dichemso in September 1968; and renamed as Osei Kyeretwie (after Nana Sir Osei Ageyman Prempeh II, Otomfuo, the Asantehene) who was known in private life as Obarima Osei Kyeretwie. In 1970, the current Tafo site of about 168-acre land was allocated to enable the school build permanent campus; the school has through 34 years operated from both the Dichemso and Tafo campuses. Following persistent pressures to move, the government eventually agreed and moved the whole school to the new site at Tafo in 2004. The philosophy or motto of the school is ‘’service to God and humanity”. Products of the school are affectionately called ‘’AHENEMMA’’...princes and princesses.

== Residence ==
There are six houses:

- Aggrey
- Prempeh
- Anokye
- Sarbah
- Bray
- Nkansah Dwamenah

== Notable alumni ==
- Otumfuo Nana Osei Tutu II, Asantehene
- Sulley Muntari, footballer, former of AC Milan and Inter Milan
- Zuta Mary Nartey, javelin thrower
- Bernard Nyarko, actor, comedian and preacher
- Georgina Opoku Amankwah, lawyer and former deputy Chairperson Electoral Commission of Ghana
- John Mensah, Former Ghana Blackstars Captain
- Vida Anim, 3-time African Champion 4x100
- Ben Wilson,Ghanaian Footballer
- Stephen Oduro, Kumasi Asante Kotoko
- Dr. Arthur Kennedy, Medical Doctor and a Politician
- Rose Asiedua, Former Member of Parliament, New Juaben North
- Veronica Bawuah, Olympics Participant
