= Umar Krupp =

Ghanaian actor

- Born: Umar Krupp; Ghana
- Occupations: Actor, producer
- Years active: 2009–present
- Awards: Pan Africa Cinema Awards, 2015

Umar Krupp is a Ghanaian actor and producer. He is best known for his roles in the films House of Gold and Amakye and Dede.

== Personal life ==
He was born in Accra, Ghana.

== Career ==
In 2015, he won the award for the Best Actor at the Pan Africa Cinema Awards (PACA).

Krupp was nominated as Best African Producer for Nollywood Entertainment and Leadership Awards (NELAS) in 2019 for producing the movie Accra Hustlers. In 2019, Krupp directed the Ama which was theatrically released in January 2020. In 2018, he acted in the film Babani. He later won four awards at the Golden Movie Awards including; City People Entertainment Award for Face of Ghana Movies.

In 2020, an upcoming actress Serwaa Akoto issued a warning to actor Umar Krupp regarding her break up with Krupp and paying problems to the actress for a film.

== Filmography ==
Year	Film	Role	Genre	Ref.
2009	Close to Perfect		Film	
2013	House of Gold	Peter Dan Ansah	Film	
2014	Trip to Hell	James	Film	
2016	Amakye and Dede		Film	
2016	You May Kill the Bride	Henry	Film	
2017	Baabani	Toufiq	Film	
2018	The King with No Culture	Mr. Ronald	Film	
2019	Origin of Love		Film	
2020	Only You		Film	
2020	Saints in Crime		Film	
2020	Aisha	Latif	Film	
2021	Accra Hustlers	Ankama	Film	
2022	The Don	Jacob	Short film	
2023	Rivals	Umar	Drama	
2024	Silence	Mensah	Drama	
