= David Owusu (film producer) =

Ghanaian film producer

- Born: Ghana
- Occupations: Film director; Screenwriter
- Notable work: Deadly Obsession; Die With Me; Play Queens; The Midwife

David Owusu is a Ghanaian film producer. He is the founder of Media 5 Productions which is known for producing movies such as "The Battle".

== Career ==
In 2009, David began his career in film. In 2011, David Owusu’s media 5 Promotions produced one of the biggest movies in Ghana; ‘A Night with Her’ which helped propel James Gardiner ‘s movie career to stardom. The movie featured Jackie Appiah, John Dumelo, James Gardiner and Khareema Aquia.

In 2012 and 2013, he produced and released ‘Die With Me’, ‘The Battle’, ‘Wrong Line’, and ‘Yvonne Tears’.

== Filmography ==
A table of films and television shows produced by David Owusu.

Production Credits
Name	Year of Release	Role	Category
Deadly Obsession	2011	Producer	Film
Die With Me	2013	Producer	Film
Broken Mirror (film)	2015	Producer	Film
Play Queens	2017	Producer	Film
The Midwife	2024	Producer	Television Show

== Awards ==
In 2023, David won the "Supreme African Film Producer of the Year" award during the 3rd edition of the Supreme Dynamic Talent Academy Awards.
