= Asantewaa: Battle for the Golden Stool =

2022 Ghanaian animated film

- Directed by: Jesse Sunkwa-Mills
- Starring: Nana Ama McBrown, Tendai Okraku
- Release date: 10 December 2022 (Ghana)
- Country: Ghana
- Language: English

Asantewaa: Battle for the Golden Stool is a 3D Animation directed by Jesse Sunkwa-Mills.

== Plot ==
The 3D Animation movie tell a story of Yaa Asantewaa, the Queen Mother of Ejisu and her quest to protect the golden stool from their colonial masters who were British.

== Cast ==
- Nana Ama McBrown - Asantewaa
- Tendai Okraku - Governor Hudson

== Awards ==
- Best Animation at the African Indigenous Language Film Festival (AILFF) 2023, Lagos - Nigeria.
