= Jeneral Ntatia =

Ghanaian comedian (born 1986)

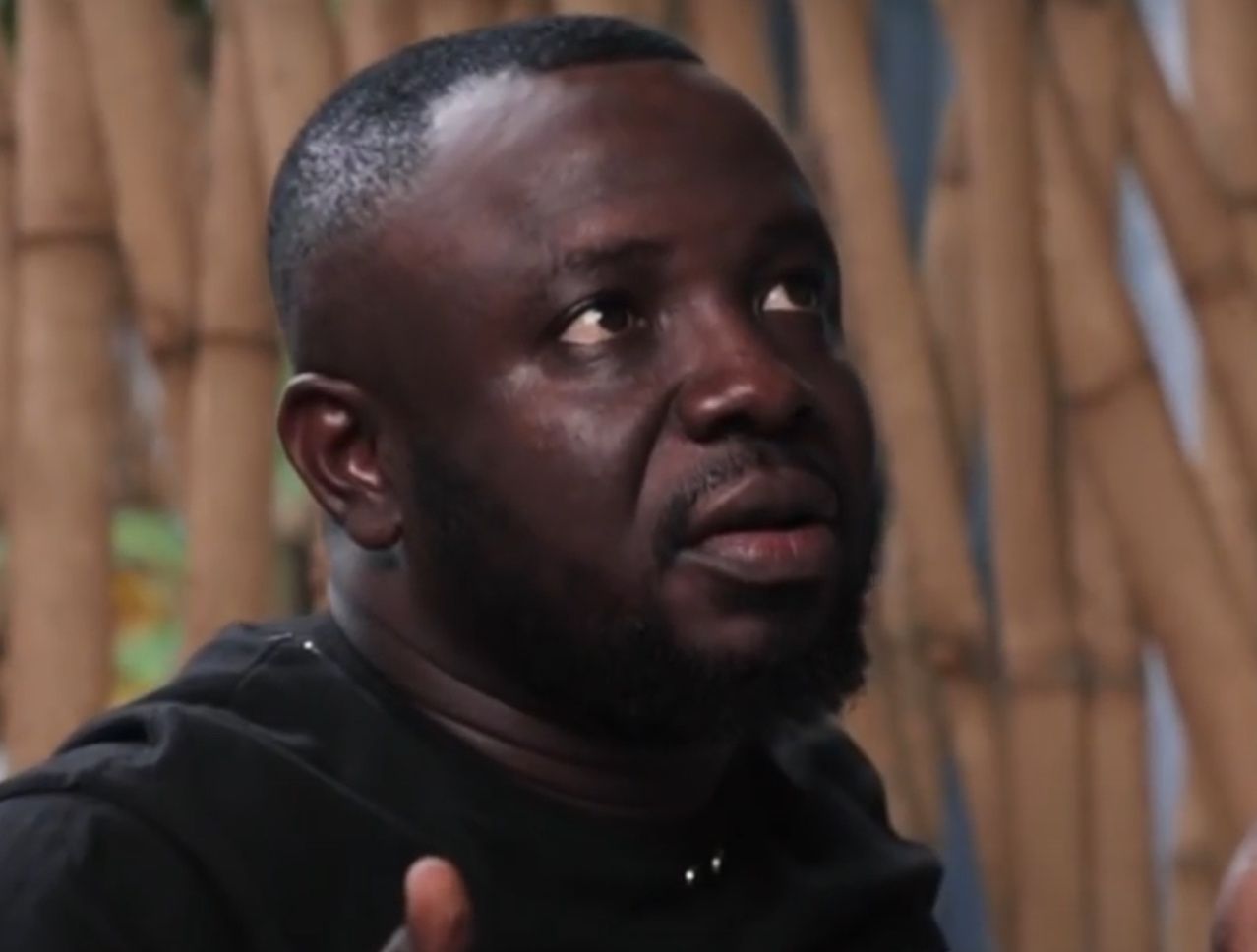
- Amoabeng in 2021
- Born: Prince Kwame Amoabeng; April 12, 1986; Accra, Ghana
- Education: University of Ghana
- Notable work: Kalybos In China (2016); Keteke (2017)

Comedy career
- Years active: 2008–present
- Genres: Comedy, acting

Prince Kwame Amoabeng (born April 12, 1986), known by his stage name Jeneral Ntatia, is a Ghanaian comedian and actor.

== Early life and education ==
Born in Accra, Amoabeng is a native of Fomena. He is a graduate of the University of Ghana, where he studied Theatre Arts.

== Career ==
Amoabeng began his comedy career in 2008 after completing Secondary School. He took a major interest in comedy when he gained admission at University of Ghana School of Performing Arts. As an actor, Jeneral Ntatia has featured in several Ghanaian movies including Keteke, Kalybos in China, Mad House, and Chaskele.

== Filmography ==
- Kalybos in China (2016)
- Keteke (2017) as Train Man 1
- Selfie (2017)
- Chaskele (2018)
- 3 Idiots and a Wise Man (2019)
- Mad House (2019)

== Television series ==
- MTN Yello Cafe
- Styke
- To have and to Hold
- The Osei's

== Theatre ==
- Second Coming of Nkrumah
- The Leopards Choice
- Adam in Court
- Red Light
- Man in the Dark
- The Trial
- Accra We Dey
- The Ladder
- Flows for Sale
- Chronicles of the Sagacious
- Christmas in April
- Bukom
- The Inspection

== Awards and nominations ==
Year	Award	Category	Result	Ref
2019	The Comedy and Poetry Awards (COPO)	Best Comedy Stage Act of the Year	Nominated	
2019	The Comedy and Poetry Awards (COPO)	Most Popular Comedian of the Year	Nominated	
2021	Entertainment Achievement Awards (EAAs)	Comic Actor of the Year	Nominated	
2021	The Comedy and Poetry Awards (COPO)	Best Comedy Theatre Act of the Year	Nominated	
