= Sugar (2019 film) =

- Directed by: Rex
- Written by: Richie Mensah
- Screenplay by: Ken Sackey
- Produced by: Lynx Entertainment
- Starring: KiDi; Adjetey Anang
- Release date: 2019
- Country: Ghana

Sugar is a 2019 Ghanaian musical romantic comedy.

The movie was written by Richie Mensah, screenplay by Ken Sackey, produced by Lynx Entertainment and directed by Ghanaian music video director Rex. It stars singer-songwriter KiDi in his acting debut alongside renowned actors Adjetey Anang, James Gardiner and Kalybos.

== Plot ==
It tells the story of an award-winning musician who allows fame to turn him into a womanizer resulting in a breakup with his long-term girlfriend. He then spirals out of control and then meets a woman who makes him change his ways until everything is challenged when his past catches up with him.

== Cast ==
- Dennis Nana Dwamena as KiDi
- Adjetey Anang as Nii Kpapko
- Cina Soul as Senam
- James Gardiner as Darryl
- Derick Kobina Bonney (DKB) as Frank
- Fella Makafui as Whitney
- Richard Asante as Kalybos
- Dela Seade as Afia Adiepena
- Veana Negasi as Cherry Berry
- Richmond Amoakoh as Mosquito
