= Tracey Boakye =

Ghanaian actress and producer

- Born: Tracey Boakye; 7 January 1991 (age 35); Kumasi, Ghana
- Education: Bower Park School (Romford, UK); Angel Educational Complex
- Occupations: Actress, film producer, entrepreneur
- Years active: 2010–present
- Awards: Performance by an Actress in a Supporting Role, 2024 Ghana Movie Awards

Tracey Boakye (born 7 January 1991) is a Ghanaian actress, film producer and entrepreneur.

== Early life and education ==
Boakye was born and raised in Kumasi. She started her education at Glory Vel School (Kumasi) and Bower Park School (Romford, UK) and moved to Ghana to continue her secondary education at Angel Educational Complex.

== Career ==
Boakye started her career in the Kumawood industry after dropping out of school to pursue acting. She made her debut in the 2010 film Cicera. She has subsequently appeared in many Ghanaian movies such as Beware, Poposipopo, Menam Na Metete, The Devil Between My Legs, and Away Bus.

She later ventured into movie productions, where she produced her first the movie, Menam Na Metete, which was released that same year under her own production company, Shakira Movie Production. She also produced The Devil Between My Legs in 2017, Baby Mama in 2019, Escaped Lover in 2024, and DNA in 2024.

== Filmography ==
Boakye featured in the following movies.

- Beware
- Poposipopo
- Menam Na Metete
- The Devil Between My Legs
- Kobolor
- Away Bus
- Escaped Lover
- DNA
- Regrets
- This Thing Called Love
- Divorce Papers
- Son of Gods (Gyebi)
- Downfall
- Deception
- Sugar Mommy
- One Bad Day
- Broken Trust
- Nice Throw
- Mastermind
- My Land Lord
- The Street Girl
- My Twin Sister
- The Maid

== Works as producer ==
Movies produced by Boakye include:

- 2019 - Baby Mama
- 2017 - The Devil Between My Legs
- 2015 - Menam Na Metete
- 2024 - DNA
- 2024 - Escaped Lover
- 2024 - Regrets
- 2024 - This Thing Called Love
- 2024 - Divorce Papers
- 2024 - Son of Gods (Gyebi)
- 2024 - Downfall
- 2024 - Deception
- 2024 - Sugar Mommy
- 2024 - One Bad Day
- 2024 - Broken Trust
- 2024 - Nice Throw
- 2024 - Mastermind
- 2024 - My Land Lord
- 2025 - The Street Girl
- 2025 - My Twin Sister
- 2025 - The Maid

== Awards and recognition ==
Year	Event	Prize	Recipient	Result
2019	Social Media Entertainment Awards	Best Actress	Herself	Won
2021	Ghana Movie Awards	Best Actress Drama Series	Herself	Nominated
2021	Ghana Movie Awards	Favourite Actors	Herself	Nominated
2024	Ghana Movie Awards	Performance by an Actress in a Supporting Role	Herself	Nominated
2024	Great Excellence Movies Awards	Best Actress	Herself	Won

== Personal life ==
Tracey and Frank Badu Ntiamoah married in Kumasi on July 28, 2022.
