= 2016 Ghana Movie Awards =

African film award ceremony

2016 Ghana Movie Awards is an annual award ceremony that awards actors and actress in the year of review for their best performances for the roles they played in various movies they cast in. The 2016 Ghana Movie Award was held at the Kempinski Hotel.
