= Nana Ansah Kwao IV =

Ghanaian traditional ruler and a journalist

Nana Ansah Kwao IV also known by the name Kwaku Sintim Misa (Born 17 March 1971), is a Ghanaian Traditional Ruler and a television and radio broadcast journalist. He is the Chief of Akwamu Adumasa and the host of That's My Opinion on Joy FM.

== Early life and education ==
Born Kwaku Sintim-Misa, Nana Kwao Misa was born on 17 March, 1971 to Kwame Danso Misa who held the position of Akyempim Hene of Kyebi during the era of Osagyefo Kuntunkununku II, and Nana Asaa Danso Misa who hailed from Adumasa. His lineage of inheritance as the King of Adumasa is matrilineal, as it was intended for his mother's elder brother to occupy the position. Patrilineally, he is the grandson of Rt. Rev. Godfried Kwadwo Sintim-Misa, a former Moderator of the Presbyterian Church of Ghana and the nephew of television personality, Kwaku Sintim-Misa. Despite his royal background, Nana Kwao faced challenges due to his dyslexic condition, which affected his academic journey. He consequently attended multiple schools, including Jack N Jill School, St Martin de Porres School, North Ridge School, the Accra Academy, and Mpraeso Senior High School.

After completing his high school studies, Nana pursued higher education at the Methodist University College in Dansoman-Accra, where he graduated with a bachelor's degree in marketing.

== Career ==
Following his university studies, Nana Kwao Misa commenced his professional journey by managing his father's business line, which included hotels and pharmaceutical outlets. This role aligned well with his marketing background, allowing him to interact frequently with customers.

Later, Nana moved to the UK, where he worked for companies such as Audi, Mercedes Benz, and Peugeot. In 2006, he started his own radio show on; That's My Opinion on Rainbow Radio in London, the United Kingdom, and about six years later he, joined Joy FM to continue the show.

== Succession to the Adumasa Throne ==
During his time abroad, the Adumasa throne had remained vacant for a decade, as it was originally intended for Nana Kwao's mother's oldest brother. However, due to his advanced age, he was unable to ascend the throne. Consequently, Nana Kwao Misa was chosen as the new Chief of Adumasa, and on 24 January 2011, he was officially installed as the Chief of Adumasa.

== Personal life ==
During his tenure at Rainbow Radio in Ghana, Nana Kwao Misa met Gifty Anti, whom he married in 2015. Following the marriage, Gifty Anti was named Oheneyiri Awo Dansoa and given the titles of Obaa and Hemasaa of Adumasa. Together, the couple has a daughter.

Outside of his professional engagements, Nana enjoys playing tennis and riding motorbikes on open roads. He also has a fondness for meals containing fried, boiled, or grilled ripe plantains.
