= Chaskele (film) =

2018 Ghanaian film dir. Kobi Rana

- Directed by: Cornelius Phanthomas
- Written by: Cornelius Phanthomas
- Starring: Fella Makafui; Kalsoume Sinare
- Release date: 2018
- Country: Ghana

Chaskele is a 2018 Ghanaian movie directed and written by Cornelius Phanthomas also known as Kobi Rana.

== Cast ==
- Fella Makafui
- Lil Win
- Kalsoume Sinare
- Richmond Xavier Amoako (Lawyer Nti)
- Reverend Bernard Nyarko
- Ian Wordi
