= Salma Mumin =

Ghanaian actress and producer

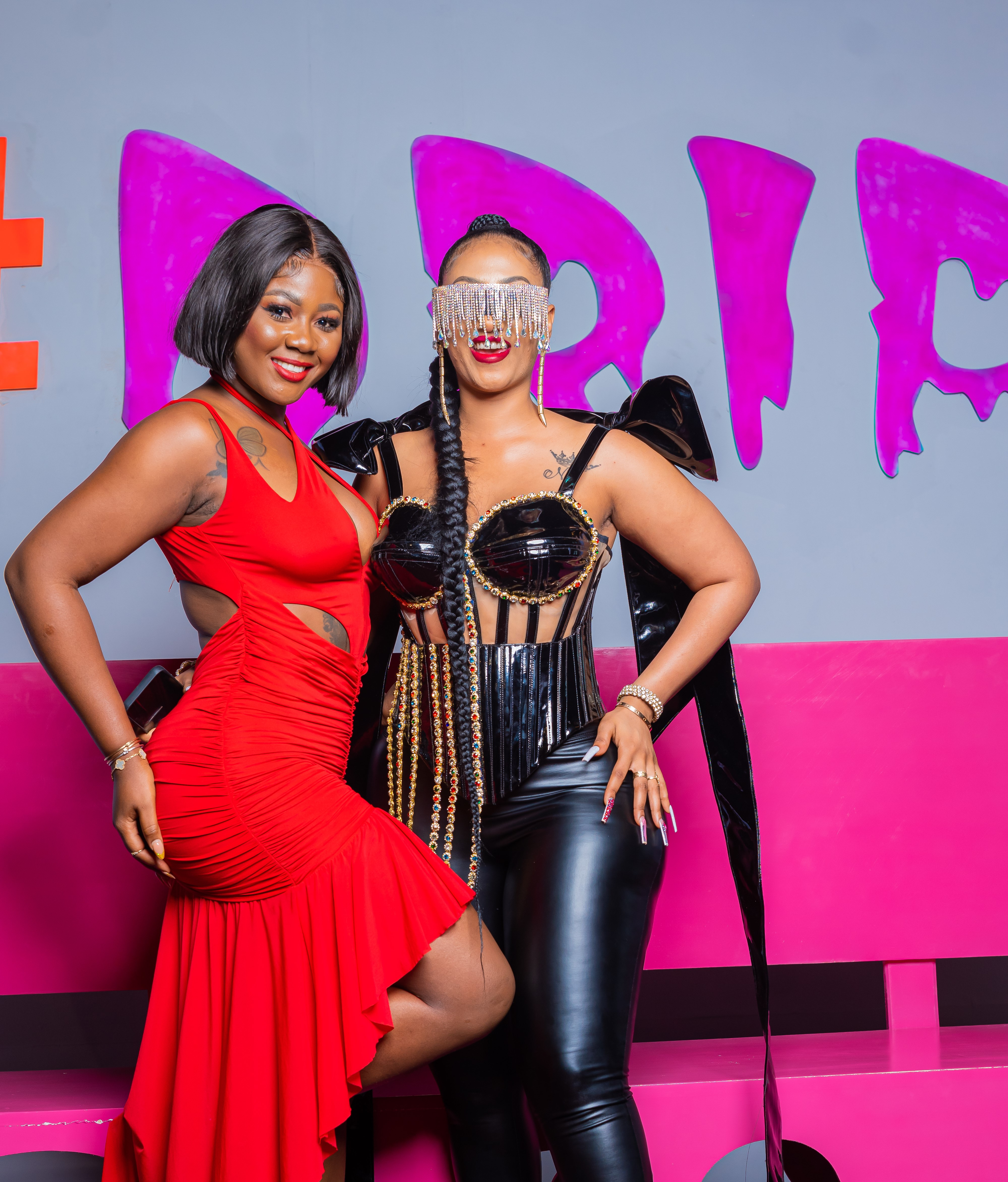
- Born: Salma Mumin; Wa, Ghana, Ghana
- Occupations: Actress and producer
- Years active: 2007–present
- Awards: Ghanaian Movie Awards, 2019

Abdul Mumin Umu Salma Tando (born December 14, 1989) is a Ghanaian actress and producer who hails from Wa in the Upper West Region. Her contributions to the Ghanaian movie industry have earned her several accolades, including Best International New Actress at the 2014 Papyrus Magazine, Screen Actors Awards and Best Actress in a Leading Role at the 2019 Ghana Movie Awards. Besides being in the film production industry, she is also a successful entrepreneur.

== Early life ==
Salma Mumin was born in Wa in the Upper West Region. She later moved to Accra to pursue her acting career. Her mother funded her education. She attended Odorkor 1 Primary School and later Insaniyya Secondary School before she entered the University of Ghana to pursue a degree in Theatre Arts.

== Career ==
Mumin made her screen debut in 2007 when she was featured in the movie Passion and Soul. Since 2012, she has also played roles in the movies Seduction, No Apology, College Girls, Leave my wife, The Will, No Man’s Land, and What My Wife Doesn’t Know, and John and John. Her first screen performance was in I Love Your Husband 1, 2, and 3 in 2009. She also starred in the film You May Kill the Bride in 2016. She has also been in international movies.

=== Producer ===
In 2015, she produced her first movie titled No Man's Land.

== Promotional work ==
Mumin's face can be seen on billboard and in TV commercials in Ghana, including commercials for UniBank, Jumbo, Electromart, and many more. Her first TV commercial was for UniBank. She is the brand ambassador for Hollywood Nutritions Slim Smart.

== Fashion ==
In February 2019, Mumin further expanded her creative endeavors by launching her clothing brand, Lure by Salma. In 2021, she unveiled her newest collection, "The Evolution", which includes eight distinct designs that reflect the brand's unique aesthetic. The collection showcases garments such as the Asibi Dress, Easy on the Eye Long Dress, invasion Skirt, Leak jumpsuit, refined 2 Piece, Shield 2 Piece, Subtle 2 Piece, and Subtle Pants. To celebrate the launch of "The Evolution", a grand event was organized at East Legon, bringing together numerous celebrities and friends from the entertainment industry. Elikem Kumordzi, Abena Korkor, Mz Vee, Samira Yakubu, Pascal Amanfo, Juliet Ibrahim, Prince David Osei, Fella Makafui, Nikki Samonas, and many others graced the occasion, adding glamour and support to Mumin's thriving fashion venture.

== Filmography ==
- Passion and Soul
- Before My Eyes (2008) - Prostitute
- Love, Lies, and Murder (2009) - Janet
- I Love Your Husband (2009)
- Temptation (2010)
- Sinking Heart (2011) - Amanda
- The Will (2013) - Tasha
- Victims (2013)
- Crime Suspect (2013)
- Purple Rose (2014) - Taz
- What My Wife Doesn’t Know (2015)
- No Man’s Land (2016)
- Amakye and Dede (2016)
- John and John (2017)
- HashTag (2018) - Linda
- Sometimes in Yesterday (2018) - Araba
- Love in the Bahamas (2019) - Chloe
- Away Bus (2019) - Bibi
- Aloe Vera (2020) - Mrs. Aleogede
- Illusions (2021)
- Foreigner's God (2022) - Nkiru
- The Recruitment (2023)
- Resonance (2024)
