= Comfort Arthur =

British-born Ghanaian animator

- Born: Comfort Arthur; United Kingdom
- Education: Central Saint Martins; Royal College of Art
- Occupations: Animator, graphic designer, visual artist, editor
- Years active: 2012–present

Comfort Arthur is a British-born Ghanaian animator, graphic designer, visual artist and editor. She is best known for the animation works such as Black Barbie, The Cursed Ones and Children of the Mountain. She is the founder of "The Comfy Studio" which is a multimedia studio based in Ghana.

== Personal life ==
She was born in the United Kingdom. She obtained her bachelor's degree in graphic design from Central Saint Martins and completed her master's degree in animation from the Royal College of Art.

== Career ==
During her time with Royal College of Art, Arthur won the first prize for the Best Emerging Motion Graphics Designer at the Real Ideas Studio in 2009. She also won the First prize for Animation/Moving Image in 2007. After graduation, she worked in a supermarket for seven years. However in December 2012, she left London and moved to Ghana as a film editor with the help of her sister. Then she joined with the Sparrow Productions and worked for three years. In 2015 she became a freelancer, and started working her own personal projects. In the same year, her maiden short animated film The Peculiar Life of a Spider was nominated in the animation category at both Ghana Movie Awards and The Africa Movie Academy Awards.

In 2016, she founded the multimedia studio, "The Comfy Studio" and produced many critics acclaimed animated shorts. In 2015, she made the short animation film Imagine which later won the award for the best Animation at the Golden Movie Awards in 2016. In 2016, she made the animation poetry short film Black Barbie and screened over 40 international film festivals. The short received critics acclaim and nominated Arthur for many awards as well as Best Animation Award at the Ghana Movie Awards 2016. The poetry won the award for the Best Spoken Piece film at the Real Times Film Festival in 2016. At the Annecy International Animated Film Festival in 2017, she was nominated for the Best Short Award. In the same year at the Queens World Film Festival, the short was nominated for two awards: Best Animation and Best Narrative Short Short.

Meanwhile, Arthur won the award for the Best Female director at the BlackStar International Film Festival as well for Black Barbie. Then in 2018 her installation work Naughty Nii won the first runner up award at the Kuenyehia Ghana contemporary Art prize. In 2019, she released the comedy web-series, titled I’m Living in Ghana, Get Me Out Of Here. In 2020, she worked with the Ladima Foundation to facilitate an animation program for young women in Nigeria.

Comfort Arthur’s Black Barbie, based on a novel, was about her own personal journey questioning society’s ideas when it came to beauty. This movie was based on the commercial and socio-cultural appeal of bleaching practices and shows Arthur’s experiences with bleaching products, along with how these experiences affected her perspectives of beauty standards. It also focuses on her activism against the use of harmful bleaching products.

== Filmography ==
Year	Film	Role	Genre	Ref.
2015	The Cursed Ones	Isoke	Film	
2015	The Cursed Ones	data wrangler	Film	
2015	Grey Dawn	Script continuity	Film	
2016	Children of the Mountain	Female Resident Doctor	Film	
2016	Black Barbie	Director, Animator, Writer, Producer	Short film	
2017	Yaa	Slave 1	Short film	
2017	Keteke	Animator	Film	
