= Away Bus =

Ghanaian Film

- Directed by: Kofi Asamoah & Peter Sedufia
- Written by: Kofi Asamoah & Peter Sedufia
- Produced by: Kofi Asamoah & Peter Sedufia
- Production companies: Kofas Media & OldFilm Productions
- Distributed by: Gravel Road Distribution Group
- Release date: 2019
- Country: Ghana
- Language: English

Away Bus is a Ghanaian film produced and directed by Kofi Asamoah of Kofas Media and Peter Sedufia of OldFilm Productions.

== Synopsis ==
Two sisters try to raise money for their mother who is sick by becoming bus drivers with the help of their friend known to raise money to save their mum.

== Cast ==
- John Dumelo as Kofi Asamoah
- Fella Makafui as Kiki
- Clemento Suarez
- Salma Mumin as Bibi
- Kalybos
- Ahoufe Patri
- Master Richard as Padlock
- Umar Krupp as Moshosho
- Adjetey Anang as Doctor
- Moesha Buduong as Anita
- Toosweet Annan as Kay
- Yaw Dabo as Prophet Awukye
- Akuapem Polo
- Abeiku Santana as Prophet Wontumi
- Kalsoume Sinare as Aunty Muni
- Big Akwes
- Akrobeto as Inspector Yeesu
- Roselyn Ngissah as Aku
- Agya Koo as Moses
- Tracey Boakye as Angie
