= Qwasi Blay Jnr. =

Ghanaian actor

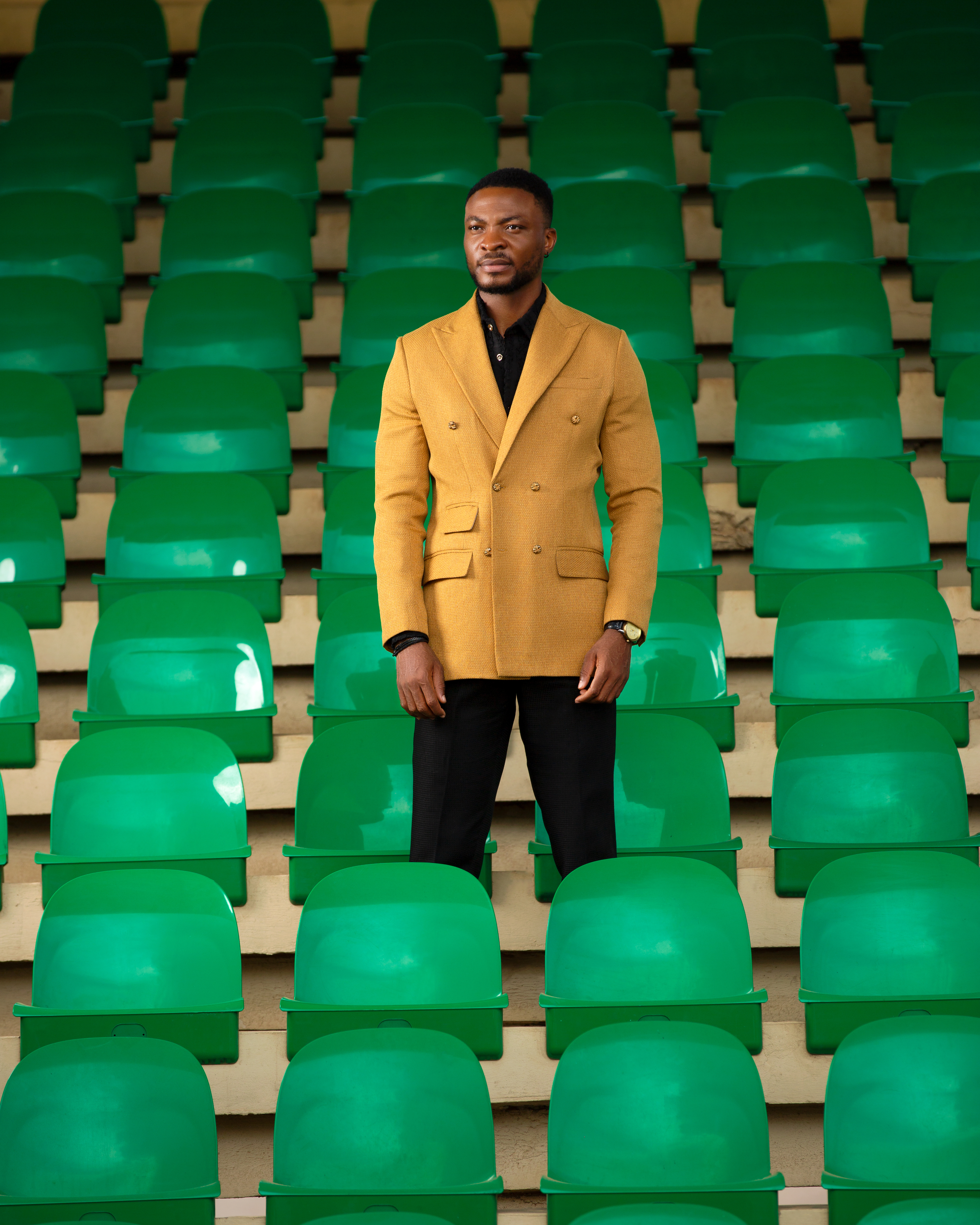
- Portrait of Qwasi Blay Jnr
- Born: Godwin Kwesi Blay Ekra Jnr; 7 March 1994 (age 32); Ghana
- Other name: Most Wanted
- Citizenship: Ghanaian
- Education: Koforidua Technical University
- Occupations: Actor, model
- Years active: 2016–present
- Known for: Dance with the devil, Grey dust, 2 days after Friday, Grilled, Serial Deju vu
- Awards: 2019 Ghana movie awards Best lead actor, Discovery of the year

Godwin Kwesi Blay Ekra Jnr (born 7 March 1994) known by the showbiz name Qwasi Blay Jnr., is a Ghanaian actor. He is best known for his roles in the films Dance with the Devil, Grey Dust and The Billionaires Wife. He has been featured in nine movies and nine TV series.

== Early life ==
He was born in Ghana as the third child in a family with five siblings: four males and a female. He completed primary and junior higher education at Great Lamptey Mills. Then he continued education from Aburi Secondary Technical (SHS). He took his tertiary education at the Koforidua Technical University and obtained a Higher National Diploma (HND) in Purchasing and Supply.

== Career ==
He started acting career in 2016 as a child, appearing in Grey Dust, Grilled, and serial Deju Vu. He received the Best Entertainment Male honor at the tertiary level and best male entertainment act at the maiden edition of the Social Media Entertainment awards. He was later nominated for the Best Performance in a leading role at The 9th edition of the Ghana Movie Awards for the role in the film Adoma.

Qwasi has been nominated for the 2021 Ghana Movie Awards as the "Best Performance By An Actor In A Leading Role" in his lead role in the movie Cross.

== Filmography ==
| Year | Film | Role | Genre | Ref. |
|---|---|---|---|---|
| 2018 | Grey Dust | | Film | |
| 2019 | Dance with the Devil | | Film | |
| 2020 | 2 Days After Friday | | Film | |
| 2021 | Shadowless | | Film | |
| 2021 | Cross | | Film | |
| 2021 | Illusions | | Film | |
| 2021 | Famous | | Film | |
| 2021 | Players vrs Slayers | | Film | |
| 2022 | Anyone Out There | | Film | |
| 2021 | Till Sunset | | Series | |
| 2021 | Deja Vu | | Series | |
| 2021 | Case Study | | Series | |
| 2021 | The Rich Girl | | Series | |
| 2022 | La Maison Chiq | | Series | |
| 2023 | The Billionaires Wife | | Series | |
| 2023 | Strange World | | Series | |
| 2023 | Madam | | Series | |
| 2024 | Goal Diggers | | Series | |

== Awards and nominations ==
| Year | Event | Prize | Recipient | Result |
|---|---|---|---|---|
| 2019 | 2019 Ghana Movie Awards | Best Lead actor | Adoma | Nominated |
| 2019 | 2019 Ghana Movie Awards | Discovery of the year | Adoma | Nominated |
| 2021 | 2021 Ghana Movie Awards | Best Performance by an Actor in a Leading Role | Cross | Nominated |
