= Serwaa Nyarko Girls' Senior High School =

All girls school in Kumasi, Ghana

Location
- Ashanti Region; Kumasi; Ghana; 6°42′34″N 1°36′35″W

Information
- School type: All Girls School
- School district: Kumasi
- Oversight: Ministry of Education
- Headmistress: Betty Oppong
- Gender: Girls
- Classes offered: Home Economics, General Science, General Arts, Visual Arts, Business Accounting, Agricultural Science

Serwaa Nyarko Senior High School is an all female secondary education institution in Kumasi in the Ashanti Region of Ghana.
