= John and John =

2017 Ghanaian film

John And John
- Directed by: Kofi Asamoah (Kofas)
- Starring: Pete Edochie; Nana Ama Mcbrown; Kwadwo Nkansah
- Release date: 2017
- Country: Ghana
- Language: English

John and John is a Ghanaian movie about two friends who are both called John.

Of interest, the film is a wholesale, unauthorized remake of a South African film called Skeem which was written and directed by Tim Greene in 2011. In 2017, Ghanaian journalists reached out to Greene to check Asamoah's claim that he had received permission to adapt the movie, which he had not. Asamoah agreed to purchase the remake rights, but never followed through. No legal action was taken, as the cost of pursuing an intellectual property case against Asamoah would not be cost effective.

== Plot ==
One of the Johns dupes a man by selling him fake gold. The two friends were running away with the money, but their car went faulty and they lodged in a guest house. As they were taking the money from their bag, it fell on the ground and created anxiety among the guests and workers in the hotel and everybody wanted to steal the money.

== Cast ==
- Kwadwo Nkansah (Liwin)
- Richard Asante (Kalybos)
- Pete Edochie
- Nana Ama Mcbrown
- Joselyn Dumas
- KSM
- Patricia Opoku-Agyemang (Ahuofe Patri)
- Bishop Bernard Nyarko
- Selly Galley
- Salma Mumin
- John Dumelo
- Abeiku Santana
- Gracey Nortey
- Grace Omaboe
- Moesha Buduong
- Fella Makafui
- Roselyn Ngissah
- James Gardiner
- Umar Krupp
