= Women's Choice Awards =

American marketing research company

The Women's Choice Award is an American marketing research company which conducts research and national surveys exclusively to women. Founded by Delia Passi in 2011, former publisher of Working Woman and Working Mother magazines.

== Market research ==
The Women's Choice Award conducts marketing research surveys using its own proprietary database of women consumers and evaluates other quantitative data, depending on the award category. The company also relies on research conducted in partnership with the Wharton School of Business on what drives the consumer experience for women vs. men. The research was the first-ever gender-based customer satisfaction study.

The Women's Choice Award donates 50 cents to charity for every woman who completes a survey on its website. Organizations receiving support from the company have included Women in Distress, American Heart Association, Michael Bolton Charities, Lolly's Locks, and the Children's Miracle Network. The beneficiary of the Women's Choice Award Show in 2017 was I am That Girl.

== Awards ==
On May 17, 2017, the company launched the inaugural Women's Choice Award Show in Los Angeles, CA. The event was hosted by television journalist Meredith Vieira. Sharon Stone received the first Icon Award. Other award recipients included Meryl Davis, Alicia Garza, Yvonne Cagle, and Jennifer Pozner.

=== Categories ===
- Hospitals
- Physicians/Physician Groups
- Financial Advisors / Firms
- Brands, Products and Services
- Best Cars
- Best Colleges
- Best Companies for Women
