= Gifty Anti =

Ghanaian journalist and broadcaster (born 1970)

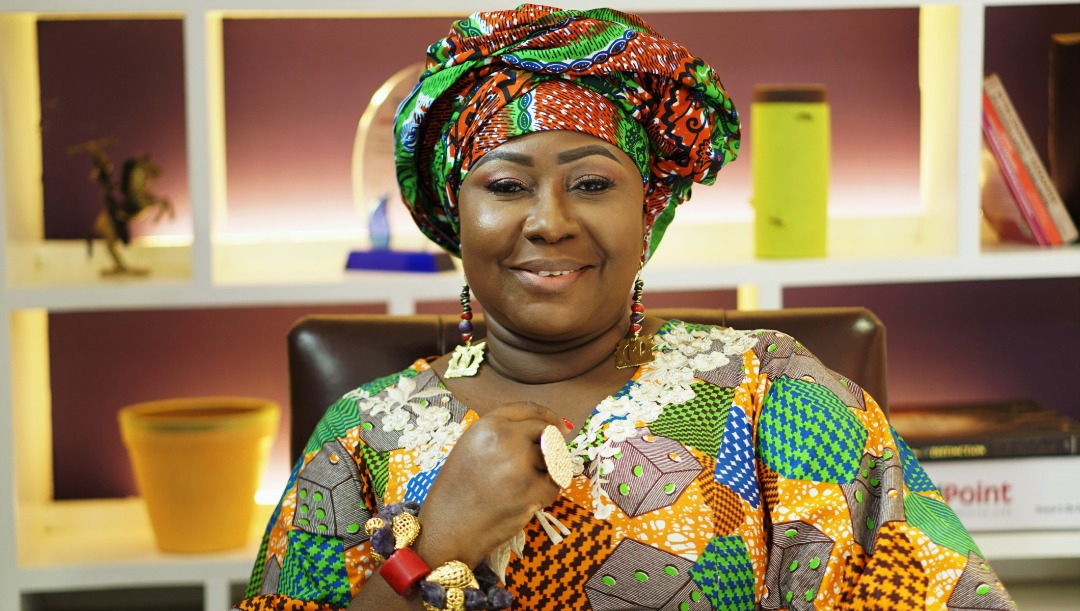
- Born: 23 January 1970 (age 56); Tema, Ghana
- Education: Mfantsiman Girls Secondary School; Ghana Institute of Journalism
- Occupation: Journalist
- Known for: Gender Advocate, Decorated Feminist
- Spouse: Nana Ansah Kwao IV

Oheneyere Gifty Anti (born January 23, 1970) is a Ghanaian journalist and broadcaster. She is the host of the Standpoint programme, which discusses issues affecting women on Ghana Television.

== Personal life ==
Gifty is a native of Cape Coast in the Central Region but was born and bred in Tema, the Greater Accra Region of Ghana. She is the last born of a family of eight. Due to economic hardship, she hawked and engaged in carpentry works to earn a living.

Gifty is married to Nana Ansah Kwao IV, Chief of Akwamu Adumasa. Their marriage ceremony happened at the Trinity Baptist Church on 25 October 2015. She gave birth to her first child on 11 August 2017. Their daughter, Nyame Anuonyam, is such a pride of hers and expresses so much joy in having a miracle child, even at her age.

She received honours and a new title which was conferred on her after being awarded a Fellowship of the Boardroom Institute (FBI) by the Accra Business school. She is called Oheneyere FBI Dr Gifty Anti.

== Education ==
Gifty Anti had her basic education at Tema community 8 "Number 1" Basic School. She then proceeded to Mfantsiman Girls Secondary School where she served as an entertainment prefect. Also, she is an alumnus of the Ghana Institute of Journalism of which she served as women's commissioner. She also has a master's degree in international journalism from City, University of London.

== Career ==
Gifty began her media career as an intern at the Ghana News Agency, then moved on to the Ghanaian Times as an intern. She later worked as an intern at the Ghana Broadcasting Corporation (GBC), where she was also offered the option to do her national service.

Gifty landed her first job as a Floor Manager at GTV. She later became a TV presenter, coach, gender advocate and a feminist. She is currently the chief executive officer of GDA Concept and host of Stand Point , a talk show about women's issues. Her show; The Stand Point also shows on ABN TV in the UK.

Whilst at Ghanaian Times [a Ghanaian owned newspaper], she received mentorship from Liz Hayfron.

In 2019, she launched her book titled A Bit Of Me; the book reached number one on Amazon after one week of publication.

She is the founder and president of Girl in Need Foundation and the Awo Dansoa Reading Project and also the ambassador for the campaign against newborn deaths.

== Awards ==
- Tell It Moms Exemplary Resilience Feminist Honour 2019
- National Malaria Advocate
- Most Inspiring Woman In Media
- Most influential women
- United Nations' MDGs 4&5 Ambassador Award 2012
- The African Women in Leadership Organisation's Excellence Award

== Publications ==
- A bit of me (2019)
- Fifty Nuggets (2020)
- The Best of You (2020)
- Broken but Beautiful
- Room 5005
