= Mikki Osei Berko =

Ghanaian actor (born 1973)

- Born: 1973 (age 51–52); Ghana
- Occupations: Assemblyman; director; presenter
- Known for: Broken Mirror, Okukuseku

Mikki Osei Berko (born 1973) is a Ghanaian actor. He played Master Richard in the TV series Taxi Driver and Dada Boat in Dada Boat.

== Career ==
He has served as the assemblyman for the Ayidiki electoral area for one term, and is also the executive director of Mediagold Productions in Ghana. Mikki Osei Berko worked extensively with Radio Gold, a private radio station based in Accra, which he left in July 2003 to join Happy FM. He later presented with Kessben FM. He is the brain behind Kente Radio, a Pan-African online radio station.

Osei Berko has served as a brand ambassador for several companies, including:

- MTN Ghana
- Kab-Fam Ghana Limited
- Piccadilly Biscuits
- Agatex Paints
- Wofa Chef Seasoning Powder

In 2021, he was unveiled as the brand ambassador for Piccadilly Biscuits Limited, coinciding with the company's 65th anniversary celebrations.

Despite his involvement in various ambassadorial roles, Osei Berko has highlighted the financial challenges associated with such positions in Ghana, noting that they are not as lucrative as many perceive.

Beyond his professional endeavours, Osei Berko is also a UEFA B license coach, certified under the English Football Association.

== Filmography ==
As director

- Broken Mirror (2014)

As actor

- Tanko Villa (2022) - OB
- Away Bus (2019) - Bob Pinto
- Kalybos in China (2016)
- Broken Mirror (2014) - Mr. Hayford
- Potomanto (2013) - Koranteng
- Okukuseku (2001) - Dan
