= Kojo Manuel =

Ghanaian MC & Presenter

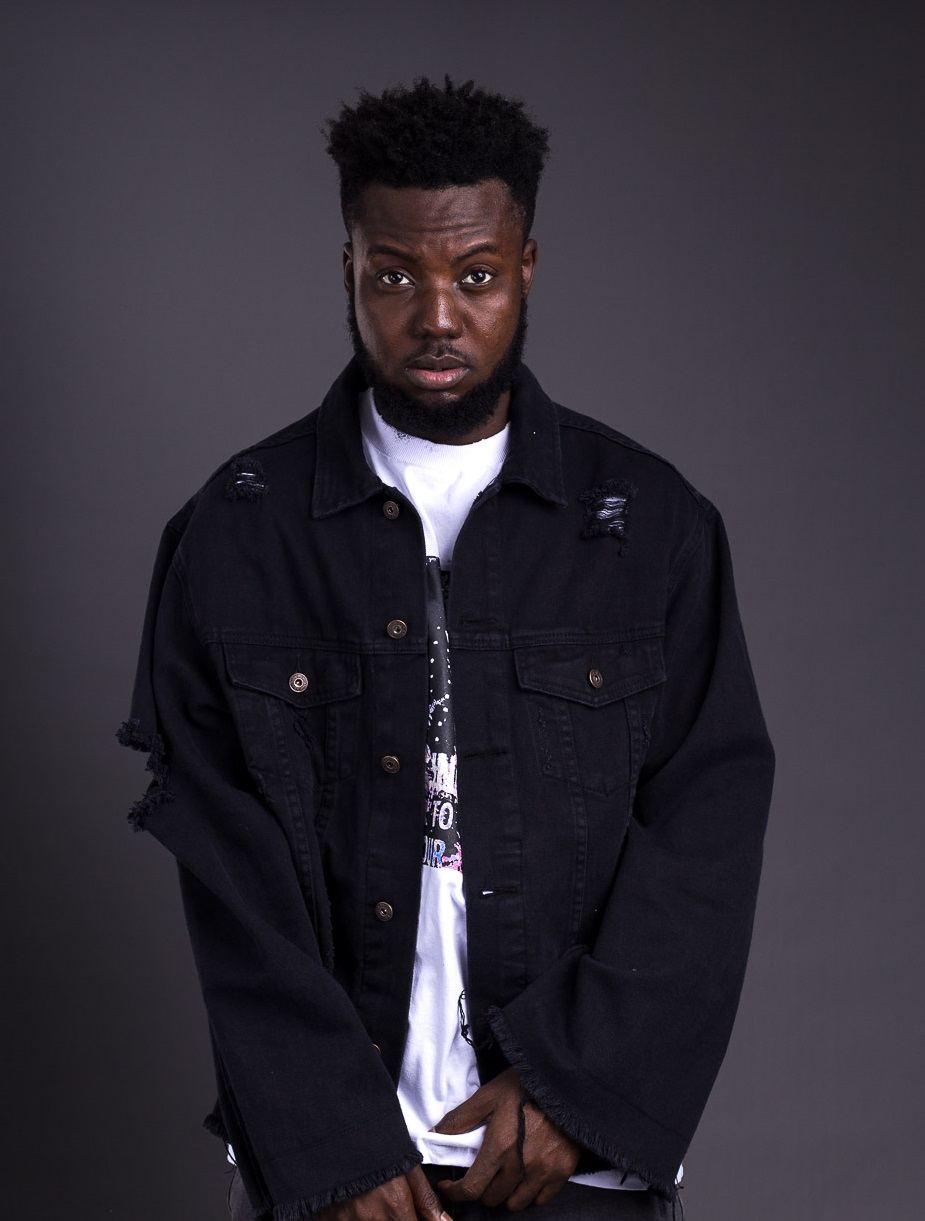
- Kojo Manuel
- Born: 4 December
- Occupations: Radio Host, Event MC, Artiste
- Years active: 2014 — present

Nyantakyi Kusi kojo Emmanuel (born December 4), known by his stage name Kojo Manuel, is a Ghanaian radio/TV host, Event MC, and artist. He presently works at Starr FM & GHOne as part of the EIB Network, where he is the host of the late weekday afternoon program Starr Drive. He formerly worked at YFM Ghana.

== Early life and career ==
Manuel was a general arts student at the Opoku Ware Secondary School in Kumasi and continued to the University of Ghana, studying diploma in archives administration and later completed a bachelor's degree in information studies.

He worked with Echo House as a digital marketer and copywriter from 2014 to 2018 and started as an MC for his university hall, Jean Nelson Aka Hall in the University Ghana in 2014.

== Notable performances ==
- Shatta Wale's After the Storm Concert 2016
- Vodafone X Concerts 2015 - 2016
- Epilogo 2015, 2016, 2017, 2018
- Hidden City House Party

== Awards and nominations ==
- 2017, Ghana DJ Awards, Best Club MC of the Year (Nominated)
- Best MC & Hypeman at the Ghana DJ Awards 2019
- Best MC/Hypeman at the Ghana Event Awards 2021
- April 2022, Best Hypeman at the Y Clash of the DJs competition

== Endorsements ==
Kojo Manuel got an endorsement deal with Guinness Ghana Breweries Ltd for their new product, Orijin in 2018 as the host of Original Beats on-air on Y 107.9 fm and on the ground events, which covered about 20 events into 2019.

== Discography ==
- Detty Yourself
- The Royal MashUp
- Akpa Show featuring Kojo Cue & Shaker
- Concern featuring Article Wan & Lipstick
- Time featuring Quamina MP, Shaker & Ginja
- Waiting featuring Kelvyn Boy & Nektunez
