= YFM Ghana =

Radio station in Ghana

- Accra, Kumasi, Takoradi; Ghana
- Broadcast area: Greater Accra, Ashanti, Western regions
- Frequencies: 107.9 MHz (Accra); 102.5 MHz (Kumasi); 97.9 MHz (Takoradi)

Programming
- Language: English
- Format: Urban contemporary, Afrobeats, Hip hop, Talk

Ownership
- Owner: Global Media Alliance

Links
- Website: yfmghana.com

YFM Ghana is Ghana's Number 1 youth radio network in Ghana, with stations located in Accra, Kumasi, and Takoradi. It operates in Accra on the frequency 107.9FM, in Kumasi on 102.5FM and in Takoradi on 97.9FM. It is owned by Global Media Alliance and was established in 2008.

== History ==
YFM launched in 2008 and expanded to Accra, Kumasi, and Takoradi through a model referred to as the 'Y-Triangle', featuring synchronized programming across the three cities.

== Programming ==
The station’s programming includes urban music such as Afrobeats, R&B, and hip hop, along with talk shows and entertainment news. Notable weekday programs across the YFM network include The Ryse n Shyne show (6am to 9am), The Myd Morning Radio Show (9am to 12noon), Shouts On Y (12noon to 3pm), The DrYve of Your LYfe (3pm to 7pm) and Y Lounge (7pm to 10pm). Additionally, the YFM network has other creative weekend shows such as Afropolitan Mix (Saturdays 9am to 12noon), Y Campus Express (Saturdays, 12noon to 3pm) and Party Pressure (Saturdays 7pm to 10pm).

== Presenters and staff ==
The YFM Network popularly known as the Y Triangle is led by Dr. Timothy Kwakye Karikari; a seasoned Strategic Brands/Media/HR and Leadership expert who works as the Director of Broadcast at Global Media Alliance. The 3 arms of the YFM Triangle also have Programme Managers who lead the individual teams to collaborate and maintain the group's positioning as Ghana's Number 1 Youth and Urban station. YFM Accra is headed by Erskine Amo Whyte (Rev Erskine), YFM Kumasi is headed by Nathaniel Osei Kuffour and YFM Takoradi is headed by Maxline Chelsy Sey.

- Rev. Erskine (Erskine Amo Whyte) – Host and current Programmes Manager
- Kojo Manuel – Host of the drive‑time show
- Pap Jay – Mid‑morning show host on YFM Kumasi.

== Awards and recognitions ==
- Kojo Manuel: Four‑time MC/Hypeman of the Year at Guinness Ghana DJ Awards (2021–2024); Mixtape of the Year (with DJ Loft) in 2024

== Events and campus engagement ==
- Launched “Y Holiday Havoc”, a festive campaign with concerts and giveaways
- Reactivated the University of Ghana’s Sarbah Hall Week in July 2025.
