= Bernard Nyarko =

Ghanaian actor (died 2020)

- Died: 2 May 2020
- Other names: Bishop Bernard Nyarko
- Citizenship: Ghanaian
- Education: Osei Kyeretwie Senior High School
- Years active: 2012-till 2020
- Known for: Hero: Service to Humanity (2017) and Sidechic Gang (2018) movies.
- Notable work: Sidechic Gang, John and John
- Children: 3

Bernard Nyarko (died 2 May 2020), commonly known in show business as Bishop Bernard Nyarko, was a Ghanaian actor and comedian who later became a full-time preacher. He was known for the Hero: Service to Humanity (2017) and Sidechic Gang (2018) movies.

== Life and career ==
Bernard Nyarko was his parents' seventh-born child among 14 other siblings. He was married with three children. He came into the limelight around 2012 and was featured in several local Ghanaian movies, including Wanted, Aban Bo sia, Boyz Abre, Sunsum Police, John and John and others.

== Education ==
Nyarko began his kindergarten education at the Swedru Salvation Army in the Central Region of Ghana, where his parents were staying at the time due to work commitments. He then moved to Primary one at Nsawam, where his mother, who worked at the Public Works Department, stayed. Since his father, who served as a police officer, had been transferred to the Kumawu area, Nyarko moved to Kumawu Presby Primary School for his Primary two (2). He went on to Asem Boys M/A Primary School in Kumasi after his father was transferred to the Zongo Police station in Kumasi. He completed form five at Tweneboah Koduah Senior High School, Kumawu. He finally completed his sixth-form studies at Osei Kyeretwie Senior High.

== Filmography ==
- The Hero: Service to Humanity (2017) as Mr. Addison
- Sidechic Gang (2018) as Mr. Sampah
- John and John (2017)
- Adepa (2016) as Pastor Adu
- Ama Pooley (2015) as Batazui

== Achievements ==
Bernard Nyarko was honoured in 2017 by Kwame Nkrumah University of Science and Technology (KNUST) for his contribution to the National Union of Ghana Students (NUGS).
