= Fred Nuamah =

Ghanaian actor and film producer

- Born: Frederick Kwaku Nuamah; November 5, 1975 (age 50); Accra, Ghana
- Occupations: actor; film director; Politician
- Known for: The Game, Pool Party, Amakye and Dede
- Children: 1

Fred Nuamah (born Frederick Kwaku Nuamah; November 5, 1975) is a Ghanaian actor, film director and producer best known for his role in the movie The Game. He is the founder and CEO of Ghana Movie Awards & Ghana TV Series Awards, an annual award show that recognises excellence in the Ghanaian film industry.

== Life and career ==
Nuamah was born in Accra and hails from Ada and Obuasi, a city located in the Ashanti Region, Southern part of Ghana.

He rose to prominence after he starred in the movie Matters of the Heart in 1993. He went on to play supporting roles in films including The Prince Bride, Heart of Men, Material Girl and 4 Play. In 2010, Nuamah appeared in The Game, directed by Abdul Salam Mumuni.

Nuamah played a role in Amakye and Dede which premiered at the Silverbird Cinemas in Accra on March 26, 2016.

He was a member of the NDC and an aspiring parliamentary candidate for the National Democratic Congress (NDC) for Ayawaso West-Wuogon in the Greater Accra region, but later on withdrew from the primaries rallying behind John Dumelo, a promising young politician to win the seat. He explained he was not influenced by external factors but did it for the unity of the NDC in a letter to the party's general secretary, Fifi Fiavi Kwetey.

=== Ghana Movie Awards ===
On January 1, 2009, Fred Nuamah founded the Ghana Movie Awards where he holds the position of CEO.

== Selected filmography ==
- Matters of the Heart, 1993 (Cameo Role)
- Dons in Sakawa (2009) as Bank Manager
- The Prince Bride (Supporting Role) 2009
- The Heart of Men (Supporting Role) 2009
- The Game (2010) as Jake Freeman
- Material Girl (Supporting Role) 2010
- 4 Play (Supporting Role) 2010
- Temptation (Supporting Role) 2010
- 4 Play Reloaded (2010) as Barrister (Supporting Role)
- Pool Party (Supporting Role) 2011
- Amakye and Dede (2016)
