= DKB Ghana =

Ghanaian stand-up comedian, actor, TV & event personality

- Born: Derick Kobina Bonney
- Education: University of Ghana
- Occupations: Stand-up comedian, TV & event personality
- Years active: 2005–present
- Known for: Ghana rep – Big Brother Africa Season 7
- Awards: 2019 Best Ghanaian Comedian of the Year

DKB Ghana originally born Derick Kobina Bonney on September 3, 1985, is a Ghanaian stand-up comedy act, TV presenter, actor, and event host. He has been touted as the new King of Ghana Comedy by Kwaku Sintim-Misa who is a Ghanaian satire-comedy innovator veteran. DKB's popularity was enhanced when he represented Ghana at Big Brother Africa (season 7) in 2012.

== Early life ==
DKB Ghana was born in the Ghana's capital city of Accra on September 3, 1985, at the Korle-Bu Teaching Hospital to Caroline Mensah and Harry Jerry Bonney, both Ga-Adangbe people of Ghana.

From basic education to Middle school graduation in 2001, he continued his education at St. John's Grammar School in Ghana where he started discovering his love for entertainment and gradually established himself as a regular dance and rap performer during entertainment programmes there. In 2005 he gained admission to the University of Ghana where his serious engagement with Stand-up comedy took roots after proving himself at an event on campus.

== Career ==
He later featured on the 'Citizen Comedy Show' on Metro TV and 'Laugh A Minute' on Viasat 1 (now Kwese TV). Africa got a feel of him when he performed at the 'MNET Comedy Club Lagos 2′ which was aired to a global audience in 2011. DKB Ghana is among the few Ghanaian TV personalities who have different shows running on different channels at the same time in addition to hosting a radio comedy show. As owner and creator of Ghana's biggest monthly comedy show dubbed Comedy Express which started in 2016, it was decided by DKB and his management that the popular show go virtual amidst the COVID-19 pandemic when in July 2020 the first virtual edition aired in Ghana. In February 2014 and two years before Comedy Express DKB organized the first ever eponymous comedy tour dubbed: DKBLIVE COMEDY TOUR across Ghana. His international comedy collaborations have seen him share the stage with Observational Comedian and Satirist in the person of Aron Kader on May 15, 2016, and with British-Congolese Comedian-Actor-Presenter-Philanthropist Eddie Kadi.

== Awards ==
Year	Award	Body	Result
2019	Best Comedy act	Ghana Entertainment Awards, US	Won
2019	Best Ghanaian Comedian of the Year	Ghana Music & Arts Awards, EU	Won
2018	Best Entertainer of the Year	GH Entertainment Awards, US	Nominated
2017	Best Comedian Act	GH Entertainment Awards, US	Won
2016	Comedian of the Year	Viasat1 “JIGWE” awards, Ghana	Won
