= Priscilla Opoku Agyeman =

Ghanaian actress and women's advocate (born 1991)

- Born: March 1991 (age 35)
- Other name: Ahuofe patri
- Citizenship: Ghanaian
- Education: National Film and Television Institute
- Occupations: Actress; Woman's advocate
- Years active: 2013-Present
- Known for: Boys Kasa

Priscilla Opoku Agyeman, popularly known as "Ahuofe Patri" (born March 1991) is a Ghanaian Actress and Women's Advocate.

== Education ==
Priscilla is a graduate of National Film And Television Institute (Nafti).

== Career ==
She began her career after becoming part of the final 10 in the Miss Maliaka beauty pageant. She later became popularly known for her comedy skits Boys Kasa with Kalybos.

Priscilla is known for fighting for young women. She launched a mentoring and a gender equality project She power, a non governmental organization which empowers young girls against sexual abuse in Africa.

== Filmography ==
- Away Bus (2019)
- Aloe Vera (2020)
