= Nikoletta Samonas =

Ghanaian actress and TV host (born 1985)

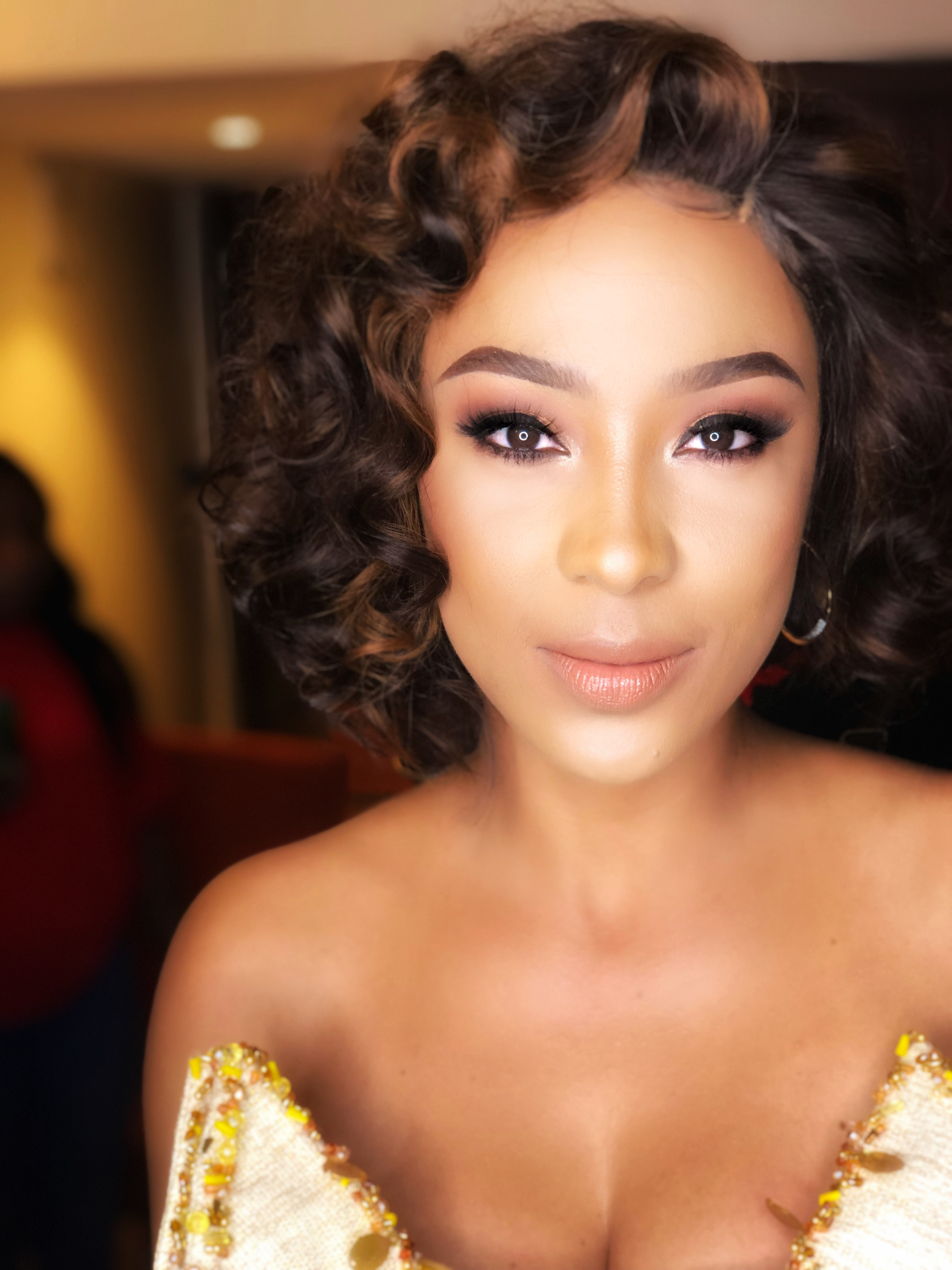
- Samonas at the 2019 Women's Choice Awards Africa
- Born: 5 September 1985 (age 40); Tema
- Other name: Nikki Samonas
- Education: Kwame Nkrumah University of Science and Technology - 2009
- Occupation: Actress
- Awards: Women's Choice Awards, Social Media Entertainment Awards, 2019

Nikoletta Samonas (born 5 September 1985) is a Ghanaian and Greek actress and a freelance model. She is known as Nikki Samonas in the entertainment industry and has had roles in a number of feature films. She is an alumna of both Holy Child High School and the Kwame Nkrumah University of Science and Technology.

== Early life ==
Samomas was born in 1985 in Tema, Ghana to a Greek father and a Ghanaian mother.

== Education ==
Samonas had her basic education at the DEKS (Discipline, Excellence, Kindness, Service) International School in Tema and continued to Holy Child High School for her senior high education, where she studied visual arts.

She later continued her tertiary education at the Kwame Nkrumah University of Science and Technology and graduated with a Bachelor of Arts in Communication Design.

== Career ==
She worked for various TV production houses, such as CharterHouse, for which she hosted Rythmz; Farm House Production, for which she hosted the African Movie Review Show; and also Breakfast Live, a morning TV talk show at TV Africa.

== Ambassadorial duties ==
Nikki Samonas is Ghana's first UNHCR Goodwill Ambassador, together with Kwame Annom. She also had a role as a high-level influencer in the UNHCR's LuQuLuQu campaign.

== Host ==
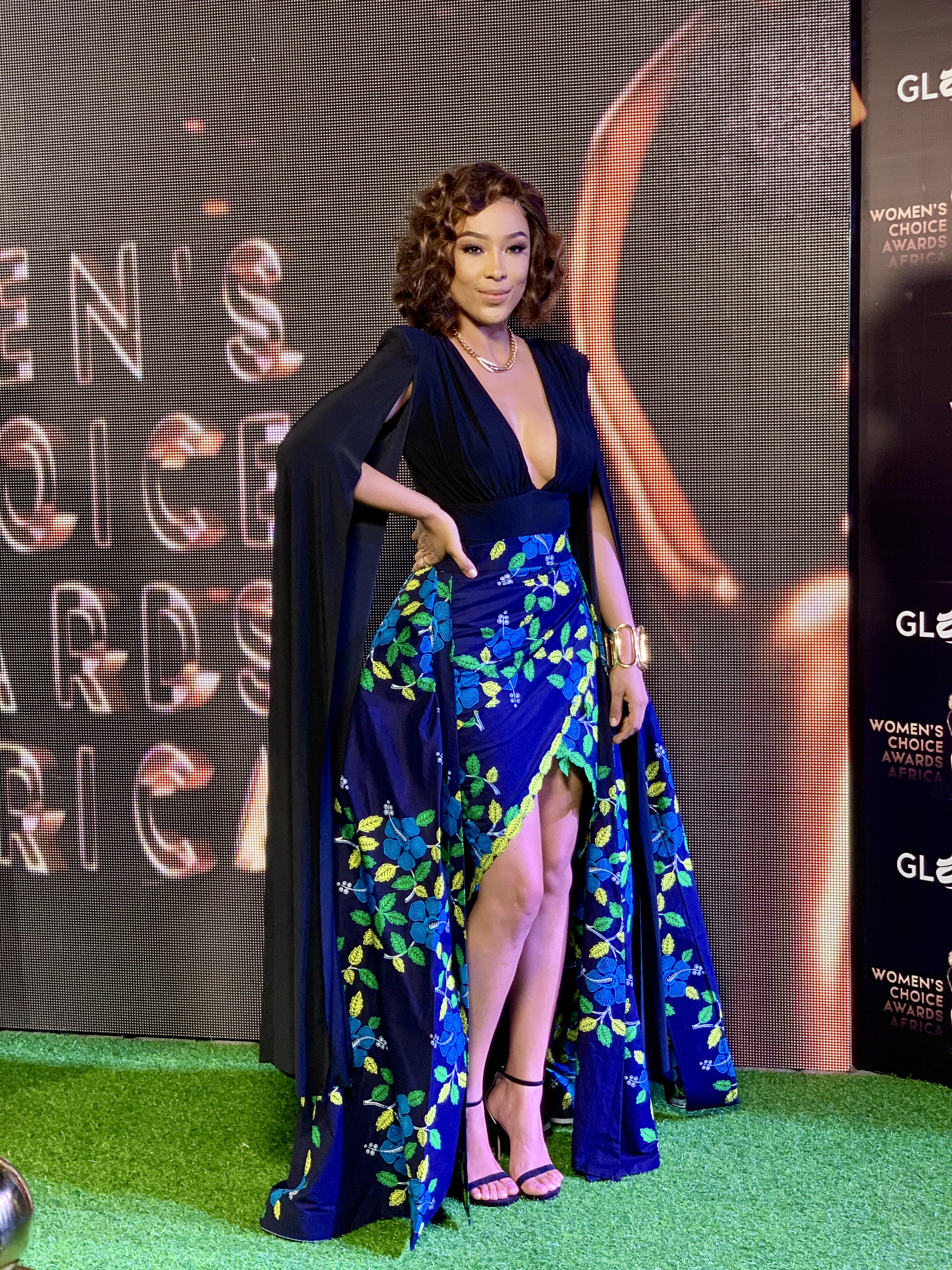
- Nikki Samonas at Women's Choice Awards Africa.
  Host of 2019 Women's Choice Awards
- Host of 2019 Golden Movie Awards Africa
- Host of 2019 Glitz Style Awards
- Time With Celebs on TV3

== Filmography ==
- Don Caritas
- Beyonce 1
- Beyonce 2
- War of Roses
- Desperate Measure (2009) as Eva
- Red Label
- Love and Bullets
- DNA Test
- Joni Waka (2012)
- Potato Potahto (2017) as Marian
- 40 and Single (2018) as Nelly
- V Republic (2014–15) as Gina
- End of The Will (2013) as Tracy
- The Will (2013) as Tracy
- Single and Not Searching (2022) as Serwaa
- Coming To Africa (2023)

=== Television ===
- Coffee, Tea
- Tanko Villa
- All Walks of Life
- La Maison Chiq
- High Currency
- Inspector Bediako
- We Too

== Awards and nominations ==
Year	Award	Prize	Recipient	Result	Ref
2011	City People Movie Awards	Best Supporting Actress of the Year	Herself	Nominated	
2014	Ghana Movie Awards	Best Short Movie	Love At the Time Of Odwira	Nominated	
2016	Ghana Movie Awards	Best Lead Actress In A Comedy Series	Herself	Nominated	
2019	Social Media Entertainment Awards	Outstanding Personality of The Year	Herself	Won	
2019	Glitz Style Awards	Movie Personality of the Year	Herself	Nominated	
2019	New Vision International Film Festival	Best Actress Africa	Herself	Nominated	
2020	Women's Choice Awards	Actress of the Year	Herself	Nominated	
2021	Women's Choice Awards	Actress of the Year	Herself	Nominated	
2022	Women's Choice Awards	Actress of the Year	Herself	Won	

== Honours ==
She was honoured by the 3G Awards 2019 in New York for her contribution to the Ghanaian movie and entertainment industry.
