= Clara Amoateng Benson =

Ghanaian actress

- Born: August 19, 1999 (age 27); Kumasi, Ghana
- Other name: Maame Serwaa
- Education: Knutsford University College
- Occupation: Actress
- Awards: Clara Benson awards

Clara Amoateng Benson popularly known as Maame Serwaa is a young Ghanaian actress and brand ambassador. In April 2018, she was featured in BBC Africa’s documentary on the Thriving Ghanaian Movie Industry. She has also won several awards including Kumawood Best Actress of the Year 2015 and Ghana Tertiary Awards Best Actress of the Year 2018.

== Education ==
Benson was born in Kumasi. She was born on 19 August 1999 to Rose Benson and Opanyin Kwabena Nyame. In 2017, she completed her secondary level education at Serwaa Nyarko Girls' Senior High School. And then was awarded a four-year degree scholarship to study at the Knutsford University College located in East Legon, Accra.

== Career ==
Benson started her acting career at the age of 6 and has since starred in several movies earning her over 10 years of experience in the Ghana movie industry. In 2018, she signed a five-year management deal with Silvanus Records. She is currently the brand ambassador for Knutsford University College.

== Filmography ==
She has starred in several movies including:

- Me Ba
- School Girl (2013)
- Agyanka Mmobro (2013) as Brenyah
- Ohia Asem (2014) as Serwaah
- Ohia Asoma Wo (2014) as Princess
- Ama Pooley (2015)
- Adepa (2016) as Yaa
- The Christmas After Party (2018)
- My Name is Ramadan (2018)
- Hope (2020) as Nurse
- Shadowless (2021) David's Mother
- Sekina
- Tumi
- Ntaafo Tumi
- Otan Ne Bayie
- Maame Serwaa Asuoden
- Bayie Economy
- My Mother My Jewel
- Maame Serwaa Amanehunu
- Maame Serwaa in Love
- Merciful Satan
- Obofo Maame Serwaa
- Maame Serwaa Time Aso
- Who Killed Maame Serwaa
- Akokoa
- Few Good Men
- Nnipa Sei Nnipa
- Seed Of Rejection
- Medimafo Tease

== Awards ==
In 2018, she was honoured by University of Cape Coast. She has won several other awards which includes:

| Year | Nominee / work | Award | Result |
|---|---|---|---|
| 2015 | Clara Benson | Best Indigenous Actress of the Year (City People Entertainment Awards ) | Won |
| 2018 | Clara Benson | Best Actress of the Year (Ghana Tertiary Awards) | Won |
| 2018 | Clara Benson | Student of the Year (Ghana Tertiary Awards) | Won |
| 2018 | Clara Benson | Student Entrepreneur of the Year (Ghana Tertiary Awards) | Nominated |
| 2018 | Clara Benson | Student Foundation of the Year (Ghana Tertiary Awards) | Nominated |
| 2019 | Clara Benson | The Legendary Award (Ghana Film Summit 2019) | Won |
