= Kalybos =

Ghanaian comic actor, filmmaker and entrepreneur

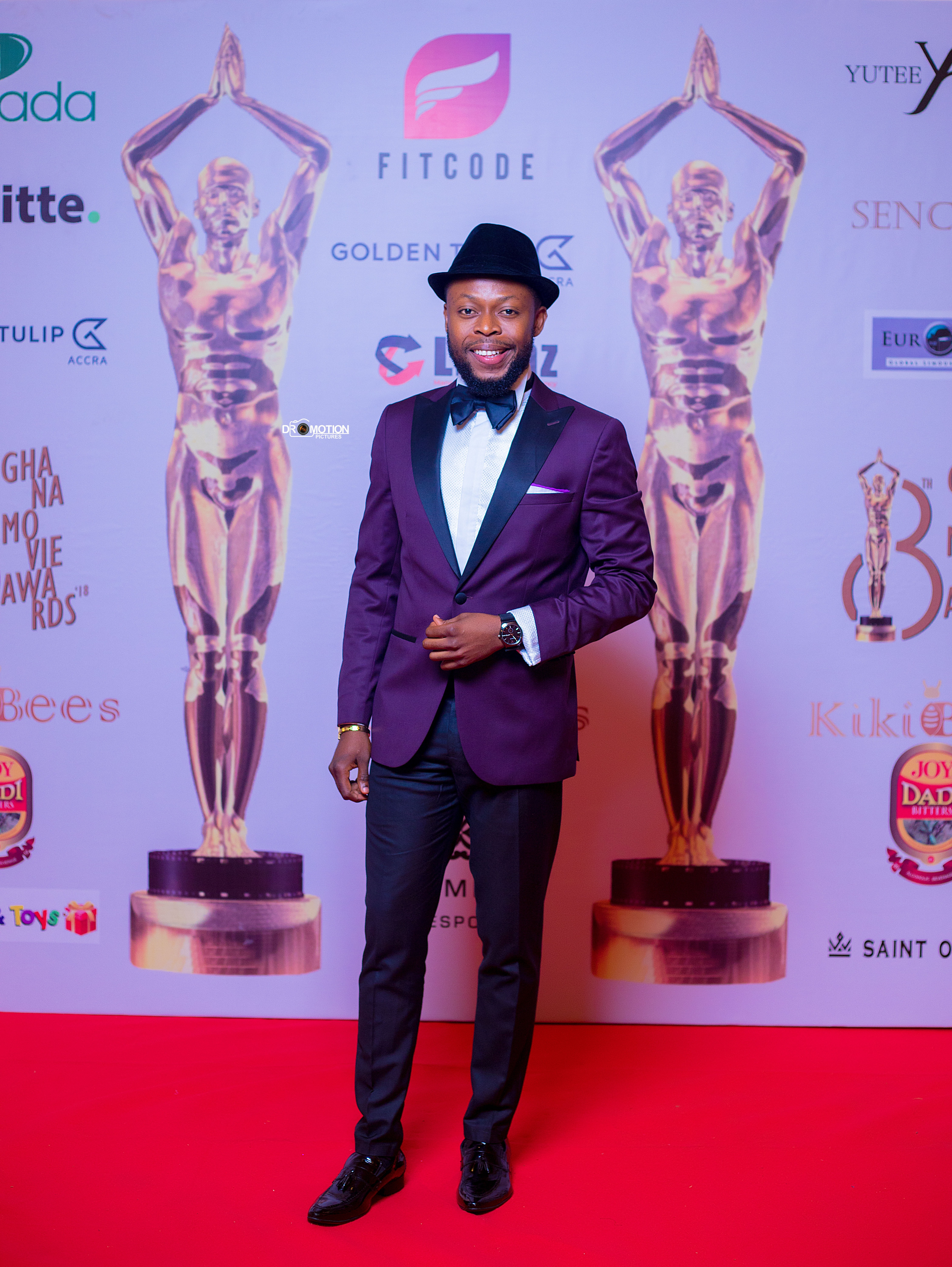
- Kalybos
- Born: Richard Asante; April 27, 1988 (age 38)
- Education: National Film and Television Institute (NAFTI)
- Occupation: Comedian
- Years active: 2010–present

Kalybos is the character name of Richard Kweku Asante, a filmmaker and an entrepreneur. He made his acting debut in the comedy video series "Boys Kasa" in 2012.

Asante is a Ghanaian actor and comedian who came to light through his role in the Boys Kasa comic series. In 2017, he and his co-star from the Boys Kasa series Patricia Opoku Agyemang, received a Black British Entertainment Award in London. He has starred in several popular Ghanaian movies including Kalybos In China and Amakye and Dede.

== Early life and education ==
Kalybos was born on April 27, 1988, to Mr. Peter Owusu Mensah and Madam Felicia Owusu. He attended De-youngsters International and St. Anthony's preparatory school in Accra for his basic education and had his secondary education at Suhum Secondary Technical School where he studied Building Construction. He furthered his education at the National Film and Television Institute (NAFTI). Kalybos graduated with a best student honor from NAFTI and with a bachelor's degree in Cinematography.

== Personal life ==
Klaybos and Antwiwaa tied the knot in a celebrity-studded wedding in Kumasi on November 11, 2023.

== Filmography ==
He has starred in several movies, including:

- Boys Kasa (2014)
- Kalybos In China (2016) as Kalybos
- Asylum Down (2016)
- Adventures of Kalybos (2018)
- Sugar (2019) as Kalybos
- John and John (2017)
- Love Language
- Maame Hwe
- 3 Broke Guys
- Chocolate City (2018) as Dobido
- A New Flame (2019) as Kwadwo Boateng
- The New Adabraka (2018)
- Okomfo Anokye Poma (2018) as Adu
- Kobolor (2018) as Alex
- Ghaniaja
- The 2 Pilots (2019) as Stagger
- Ghetto Hero (2019)
- Kaya
- Away Bus (2016) as Padlock
- Think Smart (2019) as Philip Opong
- Mad (2019)
- Slay (2021) as Emmanuel
- Charade (2021)
- In Exile (2021)
- A Happy Surprise (2022)
- Galamsey: Enemies Are Not God (2022)
- Hankuri (2022)
- Till Deaf Do Us Part (2023)
- The Cry of a Nurse (2023)
- Girl Talk (2024)

He also appeared in Conan Without Borders: Ghana with Conan O'Brien in 2019.

== Awards ==
Year	Award	Category	Film	Result
2014	Ghana Movie Awards	Discovery of the Year	Boys Kasa	Won
2017	Black British Entertainment Awards			Won
2015	Ghana Movie Awards	Favorite Actor		Nominee
2014	Ghana Tertiary Awards	Best Actor and Student of the year		Nominee
2015	Africa Youth Choice Awards	Best New Act		Nominee
2016	Golden Movie Awards	Golden Actor in Comedy		Won
2016	Exclusive Men's Award			Nominee
2016	NAFTI Film Festival Awards	Best Cinematography		Won
2017	Black British Entertainment Awards	Best International Award		Won
2017	Ghana Nigeria Achievers Awards	Best in Comedy		Won
2017	Ghana Entertainment Awards USA	Lead Actor in Film		Nominee
2017	Golden Movie Awards	Supporting Actor in Comedy		Nominee
