= Nana Ama McBrown =

Ghanaian actress and media personality

Mrs. Nana Ama Mcbrown Mensah
- Born: Felicity Ama Agyemang; 15 August 1977 (age 49); Kumasi, Ghana
- Occupation: Actress/ TV presenter
- Years active: 1998–present
- Known for: Television host, Actress
- Spouse: Maxwell Mawu Mensah
- Children: Maxine Mawushi Mensah
- Awards: Best English Actress, Best Actress in a Leading Role, Best Traditional Movie, and Best Story at the 2011 Kumawood Awards; Golden Movie Awards in 2018; Ghana Outstanding Women Awards 2020

Felicity Ama Agyemang (born 15 August 1977), known professionally as Nana Ama McBrown, is a Ghanaian actress, TV show hostess, and music composer. She rose to prominence for her role in a television series titled Tentacles. Later, she found mainstream success following her role in the Twi-language movies "Asoreba"(church member) and "Kumasi Yonko". She was the host, of the television cooking show The McBrown Kitchen and an entertainment talk show United Showbiz on UTV until March 2023 when she moved to Media General. She is a TV show hostess on Onua TV for the Onua Showtime program. Royal drinks has chosen Nana Ama as the face of their brand Kasapreko Unveils McBrown As Royal Drinks Brand Ambassador.

== Early life and education ==
Nana Ama McBrown was born in Kumasi, Ghana, on 15 August 1977. Her mother, Cecilia Agyenim Boateng living in Germany, and her father, Kwabena Nkrumah, divorced when McBrown was young. With her father gone and her mother unable to take care of her and her six other siblings, she and her siblings were adopted by Kofi McBrown and her aunt, Madam Betty Obiri Yeboah.

In addition to her six siblings, McBrown grew up in Kwadaso-Kumasi, with her aunt and her adopted father. To this day, McBrown describes her aunt as a "real mother" and has spoken of her gratitude to her for having provided for her with a stable and caring home.

McBrown attended St. Peter's International Residential School, moved on to Minnesota International, and then to Central International. She continued to Kwadaso L.A. J.S.S, although she ended up dropping out of school and could not sit for the Basic Education Certificate Exams. McBrown later attended the College of Business where she obtained a secretarial certificate.

== Career ==
=== Acting ===
McBrown's acting career started after she responded to a call for an audition on the radio by Miracle Films. She was hired to handle costuming. However, on the set, she was given the lead role after the director, Samuel Nyamekye, felt that she was better suited for the role. In 2001, her first movie, That Day, was released, launching her career. Her performance in That Day helped her land a spot on the TV series Tentacles.

In 2007, McBrown played a role in the movie "Asoreba" co-starring with popular movie stars; Agya Koo and Mercy Asiedu, which gave her the lamplight to solidify her name "Nana Ama" as a movie household name in Ghana. Afterward, she played several roles in a lot of movies.

=== Ambassadorial deals ===
McBrown has numerous ambassadorial deals due to her exquisite and creative marketing strategies, she was appointed by one of Ghana's beverage-making companies Kasapreko Company Limited as the brand ambassador of Royal Drinks, one of their many products produced in Ghana. She is the brand ambassador of So Klin washing powder. In March 2021, she was appointed as an ambassador for the COVID-19 National Trust Fund. She is also a brand ambassador for McBerry Biscuits and the brand ambassador of the electronic company named Hisense Ghana and many other brands such as Amanela Children Haven

- 23 September 2024, Nana Ama McBrwon was announced as the ‘Growth Ambassador for the Ghandour Comestics Brand. In the same month of September 2024, she was also announced as the brand ambassador for KIVO GARI alongside her son Kar Lite.
- On February 1st,2024, Deedew Spices Ghana unveiled Nana Ama McBrown as its brand-new ambassador. Sintex Water Tank, popularly known for their production of plastic products in Ghana also announced Nana Ama Mcbrown as their new brand ambassador in September 2024.
- Nana Ama McBrown is also the brand ambassador for home decoration company called Loncha, a brand that provides interior decoration and interior design in the country.
- Tasty Tom announced on December 14, 2019 at Accra Fiesta Royale Hotel at the launch of their new Tasty Tom Tomato product that it has appointed Nana Ama McBrown as their new brand ambassador.
- She is also the appointed brand ambassador for Softcare, one of Africa's brands for Baby and Feminine product.

=== Television host ===
She was the host of the television cooking show, The McBrown Kitchen and entertainment talk show United Showbiz, on UTV until March 2023.

She became the host of Onua Showtime on Onua TV; a subsidiary of Media General..In August 2025, Nana Ama McBrown hosted a charity event in Accra to support underprivileged children, raising funds for educational initiatives and earning praise for her philanthropy.

== Personal life ==
McBrown has been linked to Omar Sheriff Captan, her co-star in many movies, although both have denied any romantic attachments. In 2004, McBrown briefly dated Okyeame Kwame, a Ghanaian musician. In the course of the year, the pair were seen traveling together all over Ghana promoting Kwame's solo release.

On 15 July 2007, McBrown was enthroned as the "Nkosuohemaa" (or ceremonial queen-mother of development) of Assin-Basiako near Assin-Fosu in the Assin North District of the Central Region, Ghana.

In 2016, she married her longtime boyfriend Maxwell Mawu Mensah. In February 2019, McBrown gave birth to a girl in Canada.

After leaving UTV, she joined Media General to begin her new chapter of hosting as she was appointed the host of Onua Showtime.

In December 2025, McBrown announced her divorce in an interview on TV3

== elected filmography ==
- Coming to Africa: Welcome to Ghana (2023) - Akosua
- Asantewaa: Battle for the Golden Stool (2022) - Asantewaa
- Aleovera (2020) - Maa Vera
- Coming to Africa (2020) - Akosua
- Vagabonds (2019) - Madame Gifty
- SideChic Gang (2018) - Pokua
- John and John (2017)
- Happily Never After (2016)
- I Do (2015) - Anita
- Abro Nnye (2014) - Julie
- Medo Hemaa (2013) - Linda
- Agya Koo trotro Driver (2012)
- Beware (2011) - Chantel
- Madam Moke (2009)
- Dea Ade Wo No (2008) - Queen Mother
- Girl Connection (2008) Vanessa
- Friday Night (2008) - Missy
- Evil Heart (2008) - Judith
- The Pastor's Wife (2008) - Georgina
- The Mighty One (2007) - Queen
- My Own Mother (2007)
- Alicia (2006) - Alicia
- Obidea Aba (2005) - Maame Serwaa (snr)
- My Mother's Heart (2005) - Aboagye
- Madam Joan (2004) - Joan
- Kumasi Yonko (2002) - Yaa Akyaa
- That Day (2001) - Scorpion's Girlfriend
- Nnipa ye bad
- He Is Mine
- Nsem Pii
- Odo Ntira
- Love Comes Back
- Kae Dabi
- Wo Nyame som po ni
- Fools Paradise
- Playboy
- Di Asempa (Osofo Maame)
- Asabea (The Blind Girl)
- Pastors Club
- Onyame Tumi
- I Know My Rights
- The End
- Onyame ye Onyame
- My Soldier Father
- Alhaji Grusa
- Nana Goes To Mecca
- Games of the Heart
- Otan Hunu Kwah
- Aloe Vera
- Asantewaa
- Soantie Pastor
- 2024 Great and Mighty a series on Empress Production on YouTube.

== Honors and awards ==
McBrown has acted in many movies and has several awards including Best English Actress, Best Actress in a Leading Role, Best Traditional Movie, and Best Story at the 2011 Kumawood Awards. She also won the Favorite Actress award at the 2016 Ghana Movie Awards and Eurostar Best Dressed Female Celebrity on the red carpet at the 2016 Ghana Movie Awards. She also won Golden Actress in a Comedy Movie with the movie SideChic Gang at the Golden Movie Awards in 2018.

In 2020, she was awarded the Radio and Television Personality Awards TV Female Entertainment Show Host Of The Year 2019–2020. She also picked the TV Female Presenter Of The Year 2019–2020 award.

In 2020 she won the award for Outstanding Woman Brand Influencer at the third edition of the Ghana Outstanding Women Awards (GOWA).

In March 2021, she was awarded the Female Actor of the Year in the Entertainment Achievement Awards.

In November 2024, McBrown was honored at the Ghana Leadership Awards as the Media Personality of the Year.

== Surgery ==
Surgery In 2013, she was involved in a life-threatening motor accident on the George Walker Bush Highway near Lapaz in Accra at around 2 a.m on January 30, 2013. The accident left her with a fractured hand. She underwent surgery after the accident. However, she went for another surgery in 2021 in Germany for correction.

== See also ==
- McBrown Kitchen
- SideChic Gang
- List of Ghanaian actors
