= Moesha Buduong =

Ghanaian TV presenter, actress and model

- Born: March 10, 1990 (age 36); Kumasi, Ghana
- Education: University of Ghana
- Occupations: Actress, model
- Known for: Interview with Christiane Amanpour

Moesha Buduong is a Ghanaian TV presenter, actress, and model who is also known for granting a controversial interview to CNN reporter Christiane Amanpour on issues of sex, love, and gender. She is a top entertainer in Ghana's television and movie industries.

== Personal life. ==
Maurecia Babiinoti Boduong also known as Moesha Boduong was born on 10 March 1990. She comes from Greater Accra Region of Ghana. Retired Major Boduong and Tina Boduong are the names of her parents. Boduong has four siblings. She attended Nhyiaeso International School and Martyrs of Uganda Basic School in Kumasi and proceeded to Accra Girls’ Senior High School and later furthered her education at University of Ghana, Legon with a diploma in Theatre, Music, and Dance.

She has accomplished a lot in her career as a performer, gaining followers from all around the country. She has undergone plastic surgery as well.

In early 2024, Moesha Boduong was reported to have suffered a stroke, and was in critical condition. This affected the entire right side of her body. A concerning video surfaced on social media, showing Moesha lying motionless on a hospital bed. However, her brother, Ebito Boduong, confirmed the reports about Moesha's health on social media and created a GoFundMe account to raise funds for her medical bills. Her brother said the stroke has impaired her mobility and speech and that she needs medical attention

According to the statement, the funds received will cater for various expenses including therapy sessions and assistive device. The account aimed to raise $10,000 (123, 600) with supporters offering contributions to aid in Moesha’s recovery. After almost a year of which Moesha has been bedridden, she has recently been showing signs of steady recovery, as shared on her Snapchat page. She was seen showcasing her dancing skills happily. The video showed the extent of her battle, as she could neither move nor raise her right hand as a result of the paralysis.

== Controversy ==
In April 2018, Buduong came under criticism from Ghanaians over a controversial interview she gave to CNN reporter Christiane Amanpour. In the interview, Buduong mentioned that Ghanaian women use men as their primary source of income, since the economy is tough. They do this through engaging in sexual intercourse with the men. She is quoted saying "In Ghana, our economy is such a way that you need someone to take care of you. You can’t make enough money as a woman here. Because even when you want to get an apartment, in Ghana they take two years’ advance and I just started working where will I get money to pay?" Her comments received harsh criticism from both men and women who felt she was painting a negative picture of Ghanaian (and by extension African) women. Celebrities such as John Dumelo, Lydia Forson, Eazzy, DKB and Afia Odo shared their views on Twitter, most of them negative.

Other people also felt the criticism was unwarranted, because the comments made were a reflection of the reality of Ghanaian life. Radio host Captain Smart commended her and entreated Ghanaians to applaud her for speaking the truth.

Christine Amanpour herself has pleaded with the public not to shame Buduong, calling on the President, Nana Akufo-Addo and Gender Minister Otiko Afisa Djaba to support her. Amanpour said, "I want people to recognize Moesha's right to speak up and the courage she showed by sharing such intimate details about her personal life. As a woman and a journalist, I'm hurt and angry to see such an innocent woman condemned by the press and by many people on social media in this way. It's to the point that Moesha is not sure she can return to Ghana safely. I am so surprised to see this happening in Accra, a city that has rightly got so much attention recently for being one of the most economically and politically successful capitals in Africa. Indeed, I was heartened while I was in Accra, listening to a speech by the President himself, defending the rights of the free press to report fully, accurately and fairly."

Buduong later publicly apologized.

== Arguments surrounding controversy ==
Many felt that Buduong's contentious views were due to the patriarchy prevalent in many societies today, especially in Ghana.

Amanpor also interviewed a Ghanaian man on the same topic on which she interviewed Buduong. He voiced the fact that he has been faithful to his partner because of his meager financial status, adding on that unlike him, people who are financially stable can afford numerous partners. However, he did not receive any backlash for his opinions. Many felt that this was a double standard, as they feel more comfortable with such opinions when they came from men, as opposed to when they are from women.

== Health ==
Moesha is battling health challenges, including stroke and speech impairment, among others. She asked her fans to pray for her as she turns 35, hoping to regain full recovery.

== Charity works ==
Under her Moesha Foundation, she spent her 29th birthday with students of the Billaw Basic School in the Upper West Region, where her hometown is located. She donated school bags, books and other relevant learning materials.

== Films ==
The actress has appeared in various films throughout her career. According to IMDb, the star has six credite as an actress. Moesha Boduong's movies include:

- Swagger Babes (2012) - Winnie
- A sting in a tale as waitress (2009) - Waitress
- Grey dawn as Betty (2015) - Betty
- The Hero: service to humanity (2017) - Miss Dwomoh
- Apples and Bananas (2018)
- Akwaaba (2019)
- The Inner Woman (2019)
- Baby Mama (2019) - Ellen
- Away Bus (2019) - Anita
- Galamsey: Enemies Are Not God (2022)
