= Emelia Brobbey =

Ghanaian actress, TV hostess, film producer

- Born: 6 January 1982 (age 44)
- Citizenship: Ghanaian
- Education: Akyem Swedu Secondary school, Presbyterian Teacher's training college
- Occupations: Actress; TV Presenter; Musician
- Known for: Asantewaa, Kae, Nkonyaa, Asem Asa, Pains of True love, Games of the heart
- Children: 2
- Awards: 2016 City People Entertainment awards Best Indigenous Actress of the year, 3G awards Best Gallywood Actress, 2019 ZAFAA Global award Best indigenous actress

Emelia Brobbey (born January 6, 1982) is a Ghanaian actress, a film producer, a television presenter and a musician. She has starred in numerous Ghanaian movies; winning multiple local and international awards. She is best known for her roles in Kumawood films including Asantewaa, Kae, and Asem Asa. In 2017, she became the first actor to receive Africa Gold Award in a humanitarian project organized by the United Nations Economic and Social Council in collaboration with the Alliance Creative Common Project(ACCP).

== Early life and education ==
Emelia Brobbey was born on 6 January 1982 and grew up in Akyem Swedru to Mr Samuel P Brobbey in the Eastern region of Ghana. She studied at Akyem Swedru Secondary School for her O-level and continued to Presbyterian Teacher's Training College to acquire teaching skills. After completing Teacher's Certificate 'A', Emelia was posted to Obuasi, where she taught agricultural science. She was then introduced to acting. She also holds a diploma in Journalism, a bachelor's degree in Human Resource Management and an ICM certificate in Broadcast Journalism.

== Music ==
She released her first single song "Fa me ko" in 2019. The song was heavily criticized for the poor vocals of Emelia.The song generated widespread discussions on social media, with some users criticising her vocal response. In response to the criticisms, Brobbey stated in an interview with Graphic Showbiz that while she accepted different opinions about her music, she objected to personal attacks. She also said that the encouragement she received from some listeners motivated her to continue pursuing music. January 2020, she released her second single "Odo Electric".

== Awards & Achievement ==
- Best International Act; Royal Africa Awards 2015.
- Africa Gold humanitarian Award 2017
- Nominee; Best Supporting Actress City People Entertainment Awards 2016
- Best Ghallywood Actress and Philanthropist; 3G Awards 2018
- Best Indigenous Actress; City People Entertainment Awards 2019
- Best Indigenous Actor (Female); ZAFAA Global Award 2019, presented by the African Film Academy Awards
- Ambassador for the COVID-19 National Trust Fund 2021.

== Philanthropy ==
- Emelia Brobbey has been involved in various charitable activities through personal initiatives and the Emelia Brobbey Foundation. In October 2015, the actress and her family celebrated a birthday with the children at the Osu Children's Home, where they donated food, clothing, toiletries, and other essential items to the home. In 2016, the Emelia Brobbey Foundation donated GHS 10,000 to the Cherubs orphanage in Apire near Santase in Kumasi. In February 2025, Emelia Brobbey donated GHS 20,000, food items and other essential supplies to the Debby Bless Ghana Foundation, an organisation that supports underprivileged children.

== Filmography ==
Emelia has been praised for her acting and singing abilities. Despite being unfamiliar to the industry, she is known for her ability to portray and adapt to the roles given to her. So far Emelia Brobbey movies include:

- Asem
- Odasani (2003) as Erica
- Mpe Nipa (2007) as Naaba Snr
- Beware (2011) as Abiba
- Madanfo (2013) as Jennifer
- Ohia Asoma Wo (2014) as Vida
- Adofo Asa (2015)
- Kae (2015) as Lina
- Amakye and Dede (2016)
- Adanfo Bone (2017) as Mimi
- Games of Chess (2018)
- Honeymoon (2019) as Angela
- Heroes of Africa: Tetteh Quarshie (2020)
- The Big Six (2022)
- Kofi sika

== Personal life ==
In 2010, Emelia married Dr Kofi Adu Boateng who is the founder of End Point Homeopathy Clinic but the couple divorced in 2012. She is currently a single mother with two kids. Her first son was born while she was in school to obtain her teaching certification. Her second son was from her marriage with Doctor Kofi and was born on 13th, June 2013.
