= Ghana Movie Awards =

Ghanaian film award

- Current: 2024 Ghana Movie Awards
- Awarded for: Outstanding Achievement in Ghanaian Film Industry
- Country: Ghana
- First award: 2010
- Website: http://ghanamovieawards.com/

Ghana Movie Awards is an annual film award to recognise excellence in the Ghanaian film industry. The first edition was held on 25 December 2010 at the Accra International Conference Center. In 2017, the ceremony was not held due to the franchise being given to Zylofon media that year. The Award Sheme was founded by Ghanaian actor Fred Nuamah in 2009.

== Ceremonies ==
- 2010 Ghana Movie Awards
- 2011 Ghana Movie Awards
- 2012 Ghana Movie Awards
- 2013 Ghana Movie Awards
- 2014 Ghana Movie Awards
- 2015 Ghana Movie Awards
- 2016 Ghana Movie Awards
- 2019 Ghana Movie Awards
- 2020 Ghana Movie Awards
- 2021 Ghana Movie Awards
- 2024 Ghana Movie Awards

== Categories ==
The following are the categories as of 2015

- Best Picture
- Best Director
- Best Actor In Leading Role
- Best Actress In Leading Role
- Best Actor In Supporting Role
- Best Actress In Supporting Role
- Best Adapted or Original Screenplay
- Best Original Score
- Best Original Song
- Best Editing
- Best Cinematography
- Best Production Design
- Best Costume & Wardrobe
- Best Makeup & Hair
- Best Visual Effects
- Best Sound Editing & Mixing
- Best Directing
- Best Actor (TV Series)
- Best Actress (TV Series)
- Best Actress in an African Collaboration
- Best Actor in an African Collaboration
- Discovery of the Year
- Favourite Actor
- Favourite Actress
- Best Short Movie
- Best Animated Short Movie
- Best Documentary
