= List of Ghanaian actors =

This is a list of notable actors and actresses from Ghana in alphabetic order by surname. This list includes members of the Ghanaian diaspora.

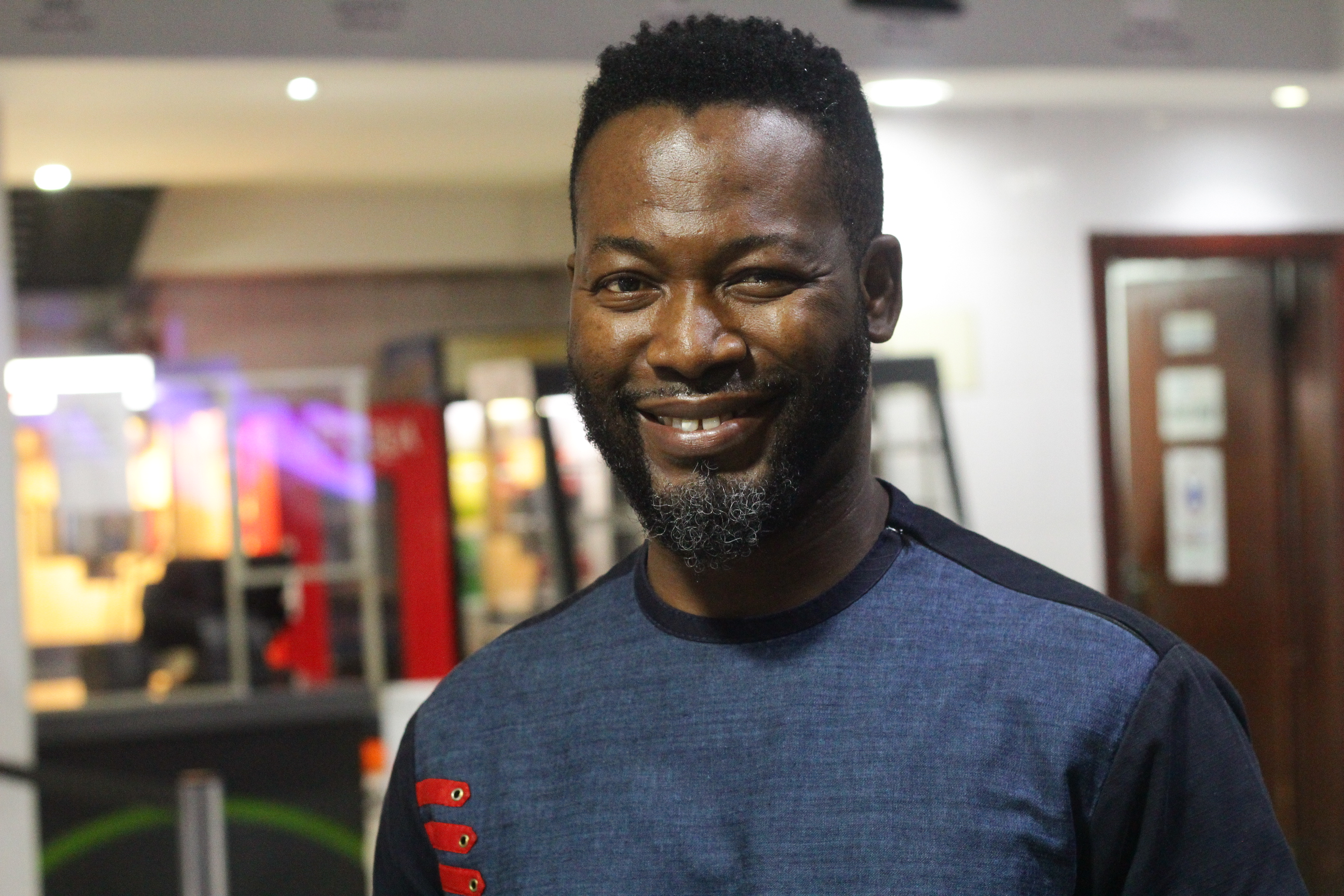
Adjetey Anang, 2021

== A ==
- Augustine Abbey (Idikoko)
- Ama K. Abebrese born 3 May 1980 (age 46)
- Mavis Adjei born 1982 (age 43–44)
- Psalm Adjeteyfio (1948–2022)
- Adjetey Anang born 8 July 1973 (age 53)
- Kofi Adjorlolo (born 1956)
- Kofi Adu (Agya Koo) (born 1968)
- Freema Agyeman (born 1979), British actor of Ghanaian and Iranian descent
- Jackie Appiah (born 1983)
- Mac Jordan Amartey (1936–2018)
- Fred Amugi (born 1948).
- Martha Ankomah (born 1985). An actress and an entrepreneur.
- John Apea
- Gyearbuor Asante (1941–2000)
- Juliet Asante
- Abraham Attah (born 2001)
- Chris Attoh (born 1979)
- Akorfa Edjeani-Asiedu (born 1969)

== B ==
- Robert Bathurst (born 1957), British actor born in Ghana
- Michael Blackson (born 1972), comedian and actor
- Kwesi Boakye (born 1999)
- King Aboagye Brenya (1938/39–2021)
- Adeline Ama Buabeng
- Nadia Buari (born 1982)
- Charles Kofi Bucknor (1953–2017)
- Moesha Buduong (born 1990)
- Akosua Busia (born 1966)
- Bob Santo (1940–2002)

== C ==
- Omar Sheriff Captan
- Michaela Coel (born 1987)
- Eddie Coffie (1959–2015)

== D ==
- Kojo Dadson
- Paul Danquah (1925–2015), British actor of Ghanaian heritage
- David Oscar Dogbe (born 1984)
- Ebenezer Donkor (1938–2016)
- David Dontoh (born 1964/65)
- Joselyn Dumas (born 1980)
- John Dumelo (born 1984)

== E ==
- Pascaline Edwards (born 1970)
- Christabel Ekeh (born 1990)
- Idris Elba (born 1972), British actor of Ghanaian and Sierra Leonean descent
- Emelia Brobbey (born 1982)

== F ==
- Souad Faress (born 1948)
- Lydia Forson (born 1984)

== G ==
- Dzifa Gomashie

== H ==
- Kobna Holdbrook-Smith

== I ==
- Juliet Ibrahim (born 1986)
- Selassie Ibrahim

== J ==
- Ian Jazzi (born 1986)
- Abusuapanin Judas (born 1945)

== K ==
- Kohwe (1946–2021)

== L ==
- Lilian Bach

== M ==
- Kwaku Manu (born 1984)
- Nana Ama McBrown (born 1973)
- Peter Mensah (born 1959)
- Majid Michel (born 1980)
- Salma Mumin

== N ==
- Eddie Nartey (born 1984)
- Yvonne Nelson (born 1985)
- Kwadwo Nkansah (born 1987) (Lilwin)
- Grace Nortey
- Jeneral Ntatia (born 1986)

== O ==
- Yvonne Okoro (born 1984)
- Grace Omaboe (born 1946)
- Mikki Osei Berko (born 1973)
- Joseph Otsiman (born 1989)
- Kwame Owusu-Ansah (1967–2008)

== Q ==
- Margaret Quainoo (1941–2006)
- Hugh Quarshie (born 1954)

== R ==
- Brew Riverson Jnr

== S ==
- Abdul Salis (born 1979), actor, comedian
- Sam Sarpong (1975–2015)
- Kwaku Sintim-Misa (born 1956)

== T ==
- Eddie Tagoe
- Reggie Tsiboe (born 1950)

== V ==
- Van Vicker (born 1977)

== W ==
- George Williams (1929–2016)
- Suzzy Williams (1981/82–2005), worked in Ghana and Nigeria

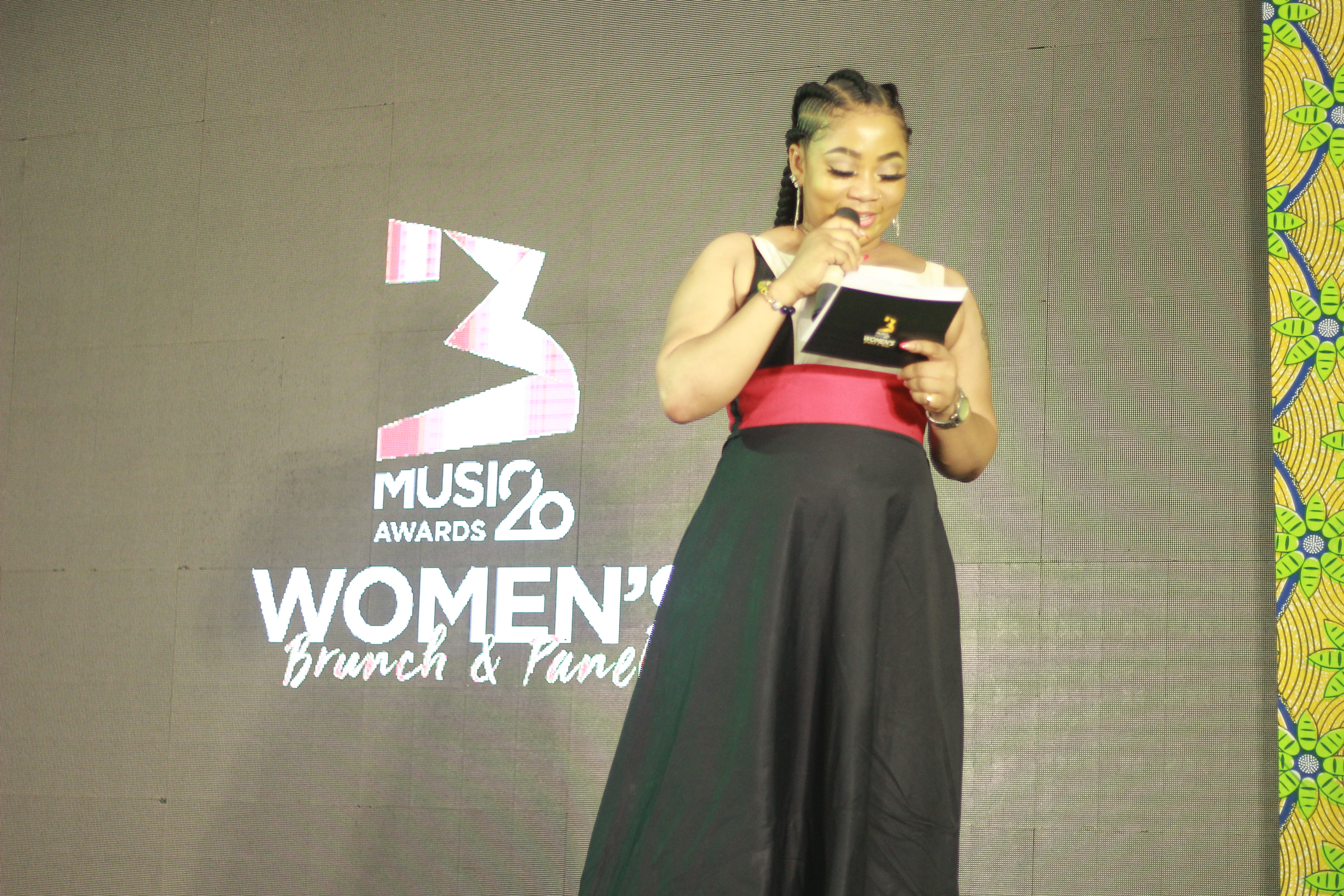
Vicky Zugah, 3Music Women's Brunch, 2020

== Y ==
- Reggie Yates (born 1983), English actor of Ghanaian descent
- Prince Yawson (Waakye)
- Vicky Zugah born 11 October 1983 (age 43)

== See also ==
- List of Ghanaian people
- Cinema of Ghana
- Ghanaian diaspora
