= Bishop Bob Okala =

Veteran Ghanaian comedian

Personal details
- Born: Samuel Kwadwo Boaben; 1957
- Died: 2016 (aged 58–59)
- Citizenship: Ghanaian
- Occupation: comedian and Actor

Samuel Kwadwo Boaben (1957–2016) also known as Bishop Bob Okala, was a Ghanaian comedian and actor popular for the comic roles he played on GTV program Key Soap Concert Party. Bob Okala gained popularity in the 80s, 90s and the turn of the millennium when stand-up comedy and pantomime began to gain widespread appeal on television. He is widely regarded as one of the comedy giants of Ghana and a pioneer of stand-up comedy. Okala was a household name and a fan favourite during his height of his fame.

== Career ==
He started his career as a footballer but his career was cut short as result of a long-term injury. He then joined a drama group called Kusum Agoromma. In the 90's his performance at the Key Soap Concert Party attracted Senior Eddie Donkor and Obuoba J.A Adofo to join them when they were having shows. He performed with the likes of Waterproof, Nkomode, Agya Koo, Bob Santo, Judas, Akrobeto, Araba Stamp, Koo Nimo and many others on Key Soap Concert Party.

Bob Okala took part in Ghana's 59th Independence Day celebrations where he donned colonial style police uniform with other veteran actors to dramatize a short play for the spectators. John Dramani Mahama and other dignitaries were in attendance. Okala died a week later.

== Death ==
He collapsed shortly after a stage performance at Koforidua Jackson Park and later died when he was admitted to the hospital.
