= Key Soap Concert Party =

Ghanaian comedy TV show

- Genre: comedy
- Starring: Kofi Adu; Bishop Bob Okala; Nkomode

Original release
- Release: 1990 – 2000

Key Soap Concert Party was a popular Ghanaian comedy show on that aired from the mid-1990s to the early 2000s. The show was aired on Ghana Broadcasting Corporation's station, GTV. It featured the likes of Kofi Adu, Nkomode, Samuel Kwadwo Boaben and Araba Stamp.

== Featured actor and comedians ==
- Bob Santo
- Nkomode
- Bishop Bob Okala
- Agya Koo
- Araba Stamp
- Akrobeto
- Paa George
- Mercy Asiedu
- Auntie B
- Waterproof
- Agya Ntow
- A1
- School Fees
- Koo Nimo
- Ekolac
- Mr Solomon
- Yaw Labito
- Felix Bell
- Abenkwan
- Asonaba Kwabrafoso Obuasi
- Orlando
- Abusuapanin Judas
