= Kotey =

Kotey is a surname. Notable people with the name include:

- Alexanda Kotey (born 1983), aka Jihadi George, stateless former British citizen
- Alfred Kotey (1968–2020), Ghanaian boxer
- Amon Kotey, Ghanaian boxer
- Clifford Amon Kotey, aka Nii Kotey Amon III, Ghanaian diplomat and traditional ruler
- Godwin Kotey (1965–2012), Ghanaian actor, producer, educator, playwright, and director
- Godwin Nii Dzanie Kotey (1956–2016), aka Alloway, Ghanaian boxing trainer
- Nii Ashie Kotey (born 1953), Ghanaian judge and academic
- Samuel Kotey Neequaye (born 1983), Ghanaian boxer
