= Auntie B =

Ghanaian actress

Harriet Naa Akleh Okanteh
- Citizenship: Ghanaian
- Education: University of Ghana
- Occupation: Actress
- Known for: Efiewura, Key Soap Concert Party

Harriet Naa Akleh Okanteh known as Auntie B or Auntie Bee is a Ghanaian actress who is known for her roles in Efiewura and Key Soap Concert Party.

== Education ==
In 2017 she graduated from the University of Ghana with a Bachelor's degree in Fine Arts.

== Career ==
She is known for her feature in the local TV series Efiewura.

== Personal life ==
She dated the late Bob Santo for six years.

== Filmography ==
- Efiewura

=== Theater ===
- Key Soap Concert Party
