= Aboagye Brenya =

Ghanaian actor (died 2021)

King Aboagye Brenya
- Born: Aboagye Brenya; 1938 or 1939; Ghana
- Died: 30 September 2021 (aged 82); Abrepo
- Occupation: Actor
- Children: 9

Aboagye Brenya (1938 or 1939 – September 30, 2021), also known as King or Nana, was an actor from Ghana. He has appeared in over 100 Ghanaian and Nigerian movies including Kumasi Yonkoo, Asem, Odasanii. He has been in movies with Agya Koo, Lil Win, Kwaku Manu, Mercy Asiedu, Bob Santo and Abusuapanin Judas to name a few.

== Career ==
Aboagye was an actor in both Ghanaian and Nigerian movies. He also worked at the Kumasi Cultural Center. He owned a school called Kumasiman Preparatory School and Ohenenana Guest House in Bohyen.

== Personal life ==
He was married with nine children.

== Filmography ==
- Abro (2002)
- Kae Dabi (2002)
- Otan Hunu Kwah (2006)
- The Choice (2001) as Zinny's father
- Remember Your Mother (2000) as Denis' father
- That Day (2001) as Rev. Turkson
- Sika (2001) as Yaw Baah
- Okukuseku (2001) as Landlord
- Kumasi Yonkoo (2002) as Koofir
- Asem (2001) as Opanyin Kufuor
- Awurade Kasa (2001)
- Adwen B (2007)
- Madam Joan (2004)
- Nyame Bekyere (2009) as Wofa Yaw
- Odasanii (2003)
- Nipa Ye Bad (2002)
- District Colonial Court

== Death and burial ==
He died on 30 September 2021 at County Hospital at Abrepo, a suburb of Kumasi in the Ashanti region. He was 82 years old. In March 2022, he was buried in Abira near Bonwire in the Ashanti Region.
