= Samuel Kwesi Oppong =

Ghanaian musician/actor

- Born: 1946
- Died: 3rd of December, 2001; Korle-Bu Teaching Hospital
- Other name: S.K. Oppong
- Citizenship: Ghanaian
- Occupations: Actor; Storyteller; Guitarist
- Years active: 1970s-2001
- Known for: Osofo Dadzie, Cantata, Abyssinia, Aku Sika, Anansekom

Samuel Kwesi Oppong (Died 3 December 2001) popularly known in the theatre industry and among fans as (S.K. Oppong) was a Ghanaian ace actor, musician and storyteller. Oppong maintained his trademark sideburns which set him apart from his fellow actors. Aside from acting, he was also an accomplished guitarist and band leader and had been in the music business since the 1950s. He composed, sang and recorded several hi-life songs during his time as a professional musician. He founded the SK Oppong Guitar Band which toured the country and played at some of the most famous venues. The group found modest success on Ghana's music scene from around 1959 with hi-life songs like "Obaa Kunadu", "Akwankwaa Hiani", "Kyere Me Ade a Meye", among others.

== Music and concert party ==
SK Oppong was already a well known musician prior to finding fame on Osofo Dadzie. He founded the "SK Oppong Guitar Band" around the 1950s, composed of several accomplished musicians in the postcolonial era when "burger highlife" was beginning to gain popularity in Ghana. The band recorded and performed several local songs which were well received by the Ghanaian public. During the heyday of touring live bands and concert party theatre in the 80s and 90s, Oppong founded "S. K. Oppong Drama Group" which toured with Nana Kwame Ampadu's African Brothers Band to provide the comic and drama elements of the band's live shows. Oppong found fame playing female roles in concert party, a stage production which combine drama and storytelling in a form of pantomime. The "S. K. Oppong Drama Group" subsequently changed its name to Osofo Dadzie Drama Group" when it became the resident drama group on Ghana's only television station at the time - GTV.

== SK Oppong and Osofo Dadzie ==
Oppong played a drag queen on the "S. K. Oppong Drama Group's" first TV appearance in the play "Aku Sika" which was performed on the popular drama and storytelling show "Anansekrom" (Ananse Town) in 1972. The play was written by Nana Kwame Ampadu and received popular acclaim during this first performance. The S.K. Oppong Guitar Band also took part in Jatokrom, a GTV Concert Party production which was managed by Nana Bosompra II. Realising the potential of drama and storytelling to educate, entertain, and inform, GBC-TV negotiated with the S. K. Oppong Drama Group to become the resident theatre and drama group. The name was then changed to Osofo (Pastor/Rev) Dadzie Drama Group to reflect the virtues and cautionary message of one of the main characters - The Pastor/Priest/Rev Minister - who usually summarised the central message of each play at the end. The late Nana Bosompra II had assumed the role of producer, director and writer for the Osofo Dadzie group with Joris Wartenberg as the creative director. Veteran Ghanaian actress - Grace Omaboe (Maame Dokono) - who later found fame with Obra was the group's scriptwriter.

Osofo Dadzie plays essentially translated popular Ghanaian oral narratives and everyday occurrences into dramatized performances. Oppong remained the leader of Osofo Dadzie for many years after this remarkable transformation in the group's fortunes. The group provided Sunday evening entertainment on television to millions of viewers for 17yrs. Oppong played many lead roles in Osofo Dadzie and was often cast as a man of virtue and noble character. The group's drama performances were hugely popular on GTV between the 1970s and 1990s.

The broader objective of Osofo Dadzie was to “expose the evils of Ghanaian society,” which included political corruption, nepotism, and bribery. This subtle attack on the integrity of some notable figures did not sit well with some public officials who made several attempts to kill off the program. Osofo Dadzie plays were performed in the Akan language. The actors spoke mostly Twi, Fante, and Akuapem. The main rival Akan drama group at the time was Obra. Key themes of Osofo Dadzie plays were centred around the virtues of honesty, integrity, kindness, patience, forgiveness, endurance, modesty, unity, etc. Oppong often sang during his drama performances and occasionally played the guitar. Some of his co-stars in the group include Nathaniel Frimpong Manso (Osofo Dadzie), Asonaba Kwaku Darko (Super OD), Kwadwo Kwakye, Fred Addai, Kingsley Kofi Kyeremanteng (Ajos), Mercy Offei, Bea Kissi, Jane Ackon (Mama Jane), Akua Boahemaa, Helena Maame Adjoa Pieterson (Adjoa Pee), Louisa Debra (Mama Lee) among others. Oppong assumed leadership of the Kantata Drama Group when Osofo Dadzie finally disbanded in 1989.

== Death ==
The legendary S. K. Oppong died at the Korle-Bu Teaching Hospital on 3 December 2001, after a long battle with an undisclosed ailment, aged 55. Ghana's Minister of Information and Presidential Affairs at the time, Mr Jake Obetsebi-Lamptey described SK Oppong as "a role model who educated Ghanaians through the arts." He was laid in state on 1 February where thousands of his colleagues from Ofoso Dadzie, the movie industry, and fans paid their last respects. Oppong was buried the next day at the Osu Cemetery.

== Career ==
He was an accomplished musician and the leader of the Osofo Dadzie drama group. He composed many highlife songs.

== Filmography ==
The list of movie.

- Abyssinia (1985)
- Osofo Dadzie
- Cantata

== Discography ==
The list of songs.

- Abusua Bone (Terrible Family) Special
- Okwankwaa Hiani (Miserable Pauper)
- Wo Aba Tenase (Be Rested If You've Come)
- He Hia Wo Mmoa (We Need Your Help)
- Esther
- Besome Daee (Send Me A Dream)
- Otanfo Nya Woa Ͻbeye Wo (The Enemy Seeks to Destroy You)
- Hyia Me Nnɔnson (Meet Me At 7 pm)
- Atea
- Bisa Ma Obi Nkankyrew (Ask To Be Told)
- Anka Me Wo Bi - Maka Ekyi (I Would Have Been Richly Endowed - I'm Left Behind)
- Asaase Nkyiri Fun (The Earth Doesn't Reject The Dead)
- Manhu Woa Mentumi Nda (I Can't Sleep Without Seeing You)
- Wawie Me Ye (You Have Completely Destroyed Me)
