= Jamestown Fisherman =

Ghanaian tv series

- Written by: Daniel Kofi Ewusie
- Directed by: Daniel Kofi Ewusie
- Starring: Psalm Adjeteyfio; Beatrice Chinery; Iddrisu Odoi; Samantha Desouza; Bintu Fati Ali; Kofi Laing
- Country of origin: Ghana

Production
- Producer: Daniel Kofi Ewusie

Original release
- Release: 2014 – 2014

Jamestown Fisherman is a Ghanaian comic television series produced and directed by Daniel Kofi Ewusie.

== Plot ==
The series gives insight of a Jamestown fisherman named Nii Lampado and his family. Nii Lampado was very passionate about education so he sent his two children, Sebe and Akweley, to have a brighter future but Sebe, who is the male child, dropped out, while Akweley, his daughter, kept her focus and made it to one of the tertiary institution in Ghana.

== Cast ==
- Psalm Adjetefio
- Beatrice Chinery
- Bismark Odoi
- Iddrisu Desouza
- Samantha Zibo
- Bintu Fati Ali
- Kofi Laing
