= Super OD =

Ghanaian actor and comedian

Asonaba Kwaku Darko
- Born: 12 January 1934
- Died: 13 February 2018 (aged 84)
- Other name: Super OD
- Citizenship: Ghanaian
- Occupations: Actor; Performer
- Years active: 1970s-2018
- Known for: Osofo Dadzie, Diabolo, Fatal Decision, Crossfire, Bongo bar

Asonaba Kwaku Darko (12 January 1934 – 13 February 2018) popularly known as Super OD was a Ghanaian comic actor and a performer who featured in the popular Akan drama TV series, Osofo Dadzie and movies like Diabolo.

== Career ==
He started his acting career in the early 1970s and became a household name in the early 1990s in the television series Akan Drama on GTV. He was with the S. K. Oppong Drama Group which later became known as Osofo Dadzie Group. Some of his co-stars in the group include Nathaniel Frimpong Manso (Osofo Dadzie), Samuel Kwesi Oppong (SK Oppong), Kwadwo Kwakye, Fred Addai, Kingsley Kofi Kyeremanteng (Ajos), Mercy Offei, Bea Kissi, Jane Ackon (Mama Jane), Akua Boahemaa, Helena Maame Adjoa Pieterson (Adjoa Pee), Louisa Debra (Mama Lee) among others.

== Filmography ==
List of films acted over the period.

- Osofo Dadzie
- Diabolo
- Bongo Bar
- Double Cross
- Fatal Decision
- Crossfire
- Expectations
