= Dogbe =

Dogbe is a surname. Notable people with the surname include:

- David Oscar Dogbe (born 1984), Ghanaian musician, actor, and comedian
- Emmanuel Dogbe (born 1992), Ghanaian footballer
- Michael Dogbe (born 1996), American football player
- Mickaël Dogbé (born 1976), French-born Togolese footballer
