= Daniel Kofi Ewusie =

Ghanaian film producer and director

- Citizenship: Ghana
- Occupation(s): Film director, Film producer

Daniel Kofi Ewusie is a Ghanaian film director, producer and actor. He is most known for his role as the producer and director of the Ghanaian television series Jamestown Fisherman.

== Career ==
Ewusie started working in films shooting music videos. He was among the crew that directed Becca's "African Woman" music video in 2013.

In 2011, he produced and directed his first TV Show Jamestown Fisherman, which starred Psalm Adjeteyfio. Jamestown Fisherman is a classical comedy drama series based on the lives of people of Jamestown, a fishing community in Ghana.

In 2019, he directed Kasoa Trotro, a TV show about road safety issues in Ghana with lead actor Funny Face. During a set, lead actor Funny Face was attacked by a police officer. This led to a debate on social media about the role of the police in the Ghanaian road safety initiative, highlighting corruption and driver intimidation by traffic officers.

In 2023, he directed and released a short film Otokunor, which starred Fred Amugi. It tells a story of a boy in a fishing community, whose father was against his decision to quit fishing in favour of a formal education. It was selected and shown at the Black Star Film Festival, The Toronto International Nollywood Festival, The Orlando Urban Film Festival and the Kano International Film Festival.

== Impact ==
Daniel directs and produces most of his TV shows in Ga Language. This had led to the promotion and preservation of the local language. His show Jamestown Fisherman highlighted Jamestown as a cultural and historical destination, setting the pace for the organization and success of the Chalewote Festival.

== Awards and recognition ==
Daniel's series Kasoa Trotro received a nomination at the 2021 Ghana Movie Awards in the Best Directed Series category, but lost out to Shirley Frimpong Manso.

His short-film Otokunor, won the Best Short Film at the Independent Short Awards and won the same category at the Orlando Urban Film Festival
