= Ras Nene =

Ghanaian actor and comedian

- Born: Ebenezer Akwasi Antwi; April 23, 1980 (age 45); Tafo, Kumasi, Ghana
- Other names: Dr. Likee, Akabenezer
- Occupations: Actor, comedian
- Years active: 2009–present

Ebenezer Akwasi Antwi (born 23 April 1980), known professionally as Ras Nene, Dr. Likee, or Akabenezer, is a Ghanaian actor and comedian. He is known for his roles in Kumawood films and for producing comedy skits on YouTube, which have attracted a large following in Ghana.

== Early life ==
Antwi was born in Tafo, a suburb of Kumasi, where he attended both primary and secondary school. In interviews, he has spoken about a difficult youth, which included early exposure to smoking and drinking, drug use, and eventual imprisonment before changing his lifestyle.

== Career ==
Antwi began acting in 2009 after accompanying friends to a film set, where he was offered a minor role. He appeared in Kumawood films, often portraying gangster or villain characters. In 2012, he started producing comedy skits, and by 2018 he appeared in more films and online productions.

By 2020, he focused primarily on comedy, creating skits on YouTube under the name "Dr. Likee," which attracted attention on digital platforms.

In 2022, he was named Comic Actor of the Year at the Entertainment Achievement Awards. In 2023, he appeared in the films Akashaolin Soccer and Akacalito.
