= Adiemmra =

- Village
- Location of Adiemmra in Eastern Region, Ghana
- Coordinates: 7°3′N 0°3′W
- Country: Ghana
- Region: Eastern Region
- District: Kwahu Afram Plains North
- Time zone: GMT
  - Summer (DST): GMT

Adeemmra is a small town in the Eastern Region of Ghana. The town is part of the Kwahu Afram Plains North District with Donkorkrom as the capital. Honourable Kpeli Worlasi is the member of Parliament for the constituency. The population of Adiemmra according to the 2010 census was 1039.

Adiemmra is the birthplace of prominent Ghanaian Highlife musician Nana Ampadu.

In 2019 the construction of a slaughterhouse was announced in the village.
