= Osofo Dadzie =

Ghanaian TV drama series

- Twi: Osɔfo Dadzie
- Literally: Pastor Dadzie
- Genre: Comedy drama
- Created by: Joris Wartenberg
- Written by: Joris Wartenberg (Note: Wartenberg starts speaking on NA ME WO HO ("I was there") on Adom TV at 0:3:48 and states he started writing for the group when at the started of the TV series.); Mama Oye Nunoo (Note: Acknowledged at 0:0:47 in Sincerely Yours); Aspect Kaikoo (Note: Acknowledged at 0:3:24 on NA ME WO HO ("I was there") on Adom TV); Grace Omaboe
- Directed by: Nana Bosompra
- Starring: Frimpong Manso (Osofo Dadzie); Asonaba Kwaku Darko (Super OD); Kwadwo Kwakye; S. K. Oppong; Fred Addai; Bea Kissi; Janet Ackun; Akua Boahemaa; Mercy Ofei; Florence Mensah; Mary Agyeiwaa
- Theme music composer: Sol Amarfio; Teddy Osei
- Opening theme: Woyaya
- Ending theme: Woyaya
- Composers: Sol Amarfio & Teddy Osei
- Country of origin: Ghana
- Original language: Twi

Production
- Producer: Nana Bosompra

Original release
- Network: GTV
- Release: 24 October 1972 – December 1981

Related
- Jatakrom

Osofo Dadzie (formed in October 1972) is a Ghanaian television drama series that was aired in the 1970s and 1980s. It was performed by the Osofo Dadzie group, a drama and concert group that was very popular in Ghana at the time the series ran. The group enjoyed two major stints on Ghanaian television: from 1972 to 1982, and then from 1985 to 1989.

== Concert party ==
Osofo Dadzie was initially a touring concert party group known as the S. K. Oppong Drama Group. They toured rural and urbran areas of Ghana where they performed improvised and unscripted stage plays accompanied by live music. Their first breakthrough came when they were recruited to perform alongside the African Brothers Band led by Nana Kwame Ampadu. Most concert parties at the time combined music and theatre. Osofo Dadzie was a very popular group and had many performances around the country. (Note: Numerous classified adverts for Osofo Dadzie performances in one single edition of the Daily Graphic newspaper.) Its plots often centred on social criticism, with the support of the Ghana government. The leader of the group was S. K. Oppong.

== TV series ==
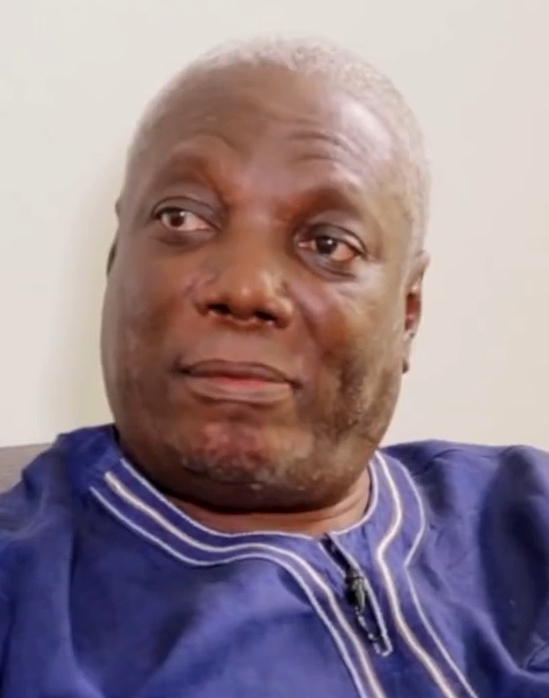
Joris Wartenberg in 2019

The group's breakthrough on television came when they performed a play Aku Sika written by Nana Kwame Ampadu, in combination with the Nana Ampadu's African Brothers Band. S. K. Oppong featured in the play as a drag queen, which turned out to be quite popular with the audience. They performed this act on a programme called, Anansekrom, (Ananse Town) organised by the Ghana Broadcasting Corporation (GBC). This was very well received and also impressed one Kobina Taylor of the GBC. Nana Bosompra, a producer with the GBC, later invited the group to perform in "Jatokrom", another storytelling show which drew largely on Ghanaian folklore and contemporary events. He engaged Joris Wartenberg, an English-language drama writer then at the University of Ghana, to be the scriptwriter for a new television series. Joris had actually come up with the idea of producing an Akan-language drama program with a much broader appeal for the uneducated masses. This led to the start of the Akan drama series Osofo Dadzie on GTV. GTV was the sole domestic broadcaster and television channel in Ghana at the time. Wartenberg suggested the group change its name to the "Osofo Dadzie Group" to reflect their new profile. They became the most popular drama show on Ghana television. The series ran from 24 October 1972 until December 1981.

Osofo Dadzie plays essentially translated popular Ghanaian oral narratives and everyday occurrences into dramatized performances for the enjoyment of ordinary folks in rural and urban areas. Episode themes usually blended Ghanaian folklore and Akan proverbial messages with prevailing socio-cultural norms in an attempt to instil virtue and moral uprightness in the populace. In some instances, the plays addressed current events, such as ritual murders, the stigma attached to HIV-AIDS, deforestation, environmental degradation, family planning, sanitation, civic responsibilities, among others.

The group initially rehearsed at Nana Bosompra's house at the Dansoman housing estate. Osofo Dadzie plays had no written scripts; at rehearsals, Nana Bosompra will come up with the main outline of the story, the core theme or moral story and then get the actors to improvise on set. The actors will then fine-tune each scene through repeated rehearsals. They also selected the most appropriate songs to incorporate in the story, often changing the lyrics to suit the context. The Acheampong government, realising the popular appeal of the show allocated each member of the group a house at Dansoman. The street where the cast lived was aptly named "Osofo Dadzie Street" and remains to this day. Oppong remained the leader of Osofo Dadzie for many years after this remarkable transformation in the group's fortunes. The group provided Sunday evening entertainment on television to millions of viewers for 17yrs. Oppong played many lead roles in Osofo Dadzie and was often cast as a man of virtue and noble character. The group's drama performances were hugely popular on GTV between the 1970s and 1980s. Several key members of the group were also recruited by Allen Gyman to feature in his popular film Abyssinia (1985).

The broader objective of Osofo Dadzie was to “expose the evils of Ghanaian society” which included political corruption, greed, nepotism, and bribery. This subtle attack on the integrity of some notable figures did not sit well with some public officials who made several attempts to kill off the program. Osofo Dadzie plays were performed in the Akan language. The actors spoke mostly Twi, Fante and Akuapem. The main rival Akan drama group which later surfaced to compete with Osofo Dadzie was Obra. Key themes of Osofo Dadzie plays were centred around the virtues of honesty, integrity, kindness, patience, forgiveness, endurance, modesty, unity, etc. Oppong often sang during his drama performances and occasionally played the guitar. Some of the main actors in the group include Nathaniel Frimpong Manso (Osofo Dadzie), Samuel Kwesi Oppong (as himself), Asonaba Kwaku Darko (Super OD), Kwadwo Kwakye, Fred Addai, Kingsley Kofi Kyeremanteng (Ajos), Mercy Offei, Bea Kissi, Jane Ackon (Mama Jane), Akua Boahemaa, Helena Maame Adjoa Pieterson (Adjoa Pee), Louisa Debra (Mama Lee) among others. Several popular celebrities of the time also made guest appearances on the show. Oppong assumed leadership of the Cantata Drama Group when Osofo Dadzie was disbanded.

== Disbandment and formation of "Obra" ==
Primetime Sunday evening entertainment in Ghana had been the preserve of the Osofo Dadzie group from around 1974. However, cracks began to appear in the unity and cohesion of the group when they returned from a European tour in early 1981. Some key members of the group had surreptitiously obtained visas with the intention of embarking on the tour without the involvement of Jane Ackon, Bea Kissi, Frimpong Manso and other key members. Invariably, the tour turned out to be a disaster, with poor attendances and cancellations, given the omission of these core members. Upon return, the group had also requested for a small raise in their transport and logistic costs from ¢40 to ¢65, in order to reflect the rising cost of living in the country. However, the new ruling military government of the PNDC and management of GBC-TV refused to compromise. Consequently, the group refused to perform any new plays until the impasse is resolved. This meant that between October and December 1981, GBC-TV had to broadcast old Osofo Dadzie episodes which gradually lost their public appeal. The new Head of State and leader of the Provisional National Defence Council (PNDC) at the time, Flt Lieutenant Jerry John Rawlings became aware of the impasse and invited key members of the production crew; Grace Omaboe (one of the main scriptwriters of Osofo Dadzie) and Nana Bosompra (Producer) to consider the formation of a rival group in order to fill the vacant artistic space whiles a permanent solution is found. Thus, the two liaised with other notable players in the industry to organise auditions and recruit the cast of a new show in 1982, called "Obra". "Obra" had begun the previous year as "Keteke" (Train/Locomotive). Osofo Dadzie initially disbanded in 1982 but was reformed in 1985. It performed for another four years until its eventual dissolution in 1989. A significant number of the cast were reconstituted in the newly formed "Cantata Osofo Dadzie Group" which came to be known simply as "Cantata".

== Cast ==
Some of the most popular characters in the Osofo Dadzie series include Super OD, played by Asonaba Kwaku Darko. Osofo Dadzie (Frimpong Manso). However, over time, most of the characters became household names. They include S. K. Oppong, Fred Addai, Akua Boahemaa and Bea Kissi. Wartenberg disclosed that he created the Osofo Dadzie character as a means of enabling continuity between the various episodes, so that the individual episodes could cover varying topics. Asonaba Kwaku Darko died in 2018.

== Notable characters ==
- Osofo Dadzie (Nathaniel Frimpong Manso): The word "Osofo" is Akan for Pastor or Reverend. He is one of the male characters of the drama group and the one after whom the show is named. Osofo Dadzie is a priest or reverend minister and can be distinguished by his clerical collar, suit, calm demeanour. He sometimes appears in the show either holding a bible, giving counselling or offering words of prayer to families or his congregation. He also summarises the theme for each episode at the end and offers a word of caution about the vice(s) around which a play is based.
- Super OD (Asonaba Kwaku Darko): OD is the direct opposite of Osofo Dadzie. He is portrayed as a man whose principles and values are compromised and often willing to make fast money or take advantage of others. OD is vane and vulgar, sometimes telling stories and jokes at other people's expense. It is believed that the initials "OD" stands for Osofo Dadzie, given that people often thought Asonaba Kwaku Darko was the Osofo Dadzie during the early days of the group. Hence, he added the word Super to the initials to distinguish himself from the real Osofo Dadzie when the identities of the two were eventually revealed.
- SK Oppong:
- Fred Addai:
- Kwadwo Kwakye:

== Theme song ==
The theme song for the programme was "Woyaya" (Wɔyaya in Ga meaning "We are going"), which was written by Teddy Osei, leader and saxophonist and Sol Amarfio, drummer of Osibisa, a popular Ghanaian Afro rock band based in London, UK. This tune became synonymous with the Osofo Dadzie programme in Ghana.

== See also ==
- Super OD
- Samuel Kwesi Oppong
- David Dontoh
- Grace Omaboe
- Grace Nortey
- Adwoa Smart
