= George Nii Armah Quaye =

George Quaye
- Born: George Nii Armah Quaye
- Other names: Aboagye . GQ
- Education: University of Ghana
- Occupations: Actor, broadcaster, entertainer

George Nii Armah Quaye also known as Aboagye or GQ is a Ghanaian actor, Media Personality, Entertainer and a Communications Professional. He is known for the role he played in the popular TV series in the early 2000s, "Taxi Driver TV series" and was also the Lead Communications Person at Charterhouse Productions Limited .

== Education ==
He is a product of Mfantsipim Senior High School and the University of Ghana where he read Theatre Arts with Film and Dance Studies at the undergraduate level and later pursued a master's degree in Communication Studies from the School of Communication Studies also at the University of Ghana.

== Career ==
His acting career begun while in primary school where he acted as Ghana's former president, Jerry John Rawlings in a mock Commonwealth Summit on the then Kyekyekule kids TV show. After Senior High School, he joined David Dontoh's "Kozi Kozi" theater company where he had heard about the auditions for the Taxi Driver Series. He attended the auditions and was given one of the five lead roles, Aboagye. While on the set, he managed to learn other elements of production including, scriptwriting, editing and directing and contributed a few episodes to the series.

In 2006, He joined the Multiple Concepts Group (Charterhouse Productions) as a copywriter and rose through the ranks, becoming the Senior Events Producer/Director and Head of Media, Brands and Communications. Together with the team at Charterhouse, he produced events like the Vodafone Ghana Music Awards, Miss Malaika Ghana, MTN Hitmaker, Ghana Rocks Music Concert, the Night of 1000 laughs among others. In January 2020 he resigned from Charterhouse Productions to start his own Events, Communications and PR Agency, Image Bureau. He was the host of an entertainment talk show known as the Pundit on [GHOne TV].

== Filmography ==
- Kyekyekule
- Taxi Driver
- 419
- Double Jam
- Anansi
