= Captain Ibrahim Traore: The Last African Hero =

2025 Ghanaian film

Captain Ibrahim Traore: The Last African Hero is a film produced and directed by Jackson K. Bentum. It tells the story of Captain Ibrahim Traore and how he rose to become the president of Burkina Faso. The film premiered at Kumasi SG Mall on 2 August 2025 and was also screened at Eusbett Cinema, Sunyani, on 16 August 2025.

== Cast ==
- Kwadwo Nkansah
- Adjetey Anang
- Sweet Mimi
- Abodie
- Ghadafi
