= 2016 (disambiguation) =

2016 was a leap year starting on Friday of the Gregorian calendar. It may also refer to:

- 2016 (number), a composite number
- 2016 (2010 film), a Ghanaian science fiction film
- 2016: Obama's America, a 2012 American documentary film
