= Sweet Palmwine =

2024 Ghanaian drama movie

- Directed by: Wael Halabi Hakim
- Produced by: Wahala Entertainment
- Starring: Fred Amugi, Pascaline Edwards, Aaron Adatsi, Rosa K.O. Mensah, Willie Chambers
- Release date: 2024
- Country: Ghana

Sweet Palmwine is a 2024 Ghanaian drama movie which was released by the Ghanaian band Kwan Pa and directed by Wael Halabi Hakim. The movie was premiered on 26 October 2024 at the Silver Bird Cinema in Accra.

== Plot ==
A family of three returned to their village because of economic hardship in the city. This movie features Kwan Pa's signature palm wine music.

== Cast ==
The movie featured the following cast:

- Rosa K.O. Mensah,
- Willie Chambers,
- Fred Amugi,
- Pascaline Edwards,
- Aaron Adatsi,
- Ricky Kofi Adelayitar
- Kwan Pa
- Ophelia Walker
