= Mercy Asiedu =

Ghanaian actress (born 1971)

- Born: 9 May 1971 (age 54)
- Citizenship: Ghanaian
- Occupation: Actress
- Known for: Concert party, Asoreba, Obi Yaa, Old Soldier
- Spouse: Nana Agyemang Badu Duah
- Children: 3

Mercy Asiedu (born 9 May 1971) is a Ghanaian veteran actress who has contributed to the growth of the movie industry. She is known for the role she played in Concert Party and Asoreba. She is also known as being one of the popular Kumawood actresses, starring in several roles in the 2000s.

== Career ==
Before venturing into acting, Mercy Asiedu worked as a seamstress. Her entry into the world of acting was facilitated by her godfather, Apostle Kwadwo Sarfo. She initially performed with a small entertainment group, entertaining church congregations, especially during conventions. "I used to perform at church conventions," she recounted.

The 50-year-old actress has often credited Apostle Kwadwo Sarfo for recognizing her talent and encouraging her and her colleagues to pursue acting. She recounted to Becky that Apostle Sarfo invited her, Agya Koo, and Akrobeto to join the concert party crew, as they were already involved in similar activities. "My godfather supported us by writing a story to help us advance in our acting careers, telling us that one day it would prove valuable," she recalled.

Mercy Asiedu's career flourished as she went on to star in numerous films, including Obaakofou, Sumsum, Aware, Kakra Yebedie, Agya Koo Trotro, Ghana Yonko, Emma Dodo Kunu, Divine Prayer, Obi Yaa, Sama Te Fie, and Old Soldier. Her role in the film Asoreba significantly boosted her recognition among global audiences. "Since then, I've appeared in countless movies. Asoreba introduced me to a broader audience, and it's one of my favourite films, alongside I Know My Right. I'm proud of what I've achieved over the years," she expressed on JoyNews.

Born on May 9, 1971, Mercy Asiedu is a veteran Ghanaian actress who has made significant contributions to the film industry. She gained fame for her roles in the 1990s Ghanaian stage drama Concert Party and became one of the prominent Kumawood actresses of the 2000s, known for her versatility and for often taking on controversial roles. Her acting journey began in her teenage years as part of the Kristo Asafo Concert Party group.

She is known for the controversial roles she has played in movies. She has acted in several Kumawood movies, movies from Kumasi produced in the local dialect of the Akans, Twi. She has been in movies with Agya Koo, Lil Win, Kwaku Manu, Aboagye Brenya to mention a few.

== Personal life ==
On 2 April 2017, she married Nana Agyemang Badu Duah, a chief of Kunsu in the Ahafo Ano South District in the Ashanti Region. She has three children, two sons and a daughter.

=== Politics ===
In September 2016, she endorsed the presidential candidate of the New Patriotic Party, Nana Addo Dankwa Akufo-Addo. In July 2016, she came out to say that she would curse anyone who made claims that she had collected money to campaign for the then-ruling National Democratic Congress.

== Filmography ==
- Obaa Hemaa (2007) as Abrafi
- Susubiribi (2013) as Kwaku's Mum
- Kakra A Yebedie Nti (2006) as Maame Achia
- Agya Koo Trotro Driver (2012)
- Ghana Yonko
- Emaa doduo Kunu
- Eye Asem (2011) as Bruwaa
- Obidee Aba (2005) as Maame Nyarkoaa
- Asoreba (2007)
- Akurasi Burgers (2008) as Frema
