= Frimpong Manso (actor) =

Ghanaian actor (1939–2020)

- Born: August 7, 1939
- Died: August 10, 2020 (aged 81)
- Other name: Osofo Dadzie
- Citizenship: Ghanaian
- Occupations: Actor; Film Producer
- Years active: 1970-2020
- Known for: Cantata, Osofo Dadzie

Frimpong Manso (1939 – 2020) also known as Osofo Dadzie, was a Ghanaian veteran actor and producer who was the lead character on Osofo Dadzie, a Ghanaian television drama series between 1970 and 1993. He died on August 10, 2020, aged 81.

== Career ==
He was one of the lead actors in Osofo Dadzie drama series which was a creation of the S. K. Oppong Drama Group, later referred to as the Osofo Dadzie Group. The characters he acted with in the TV series were Super OD, Kingsley Kofi Kyeremanteng (Ajos), Bea Kisi, Akora Badu, S.K Oppong. The drama series was aired on GTV. He appeared in Ghana Commercial Bank advert in the 1990s.

== Filmography ==
- Cantata
- Osofo Dadzie
