= Vivian Jill Lawrence =

Ghanaian actress (born 1983)

Vivian Jill
- Born: Vivian Jill Lawrence; 11 September 1983 (age 43); Kano, Nigeria
- Occupations: Actor, philanthropist
- Partner: Don Kingsley Yamoah
- Children: Clinton Prempeh and Alfie Nana Amponsah Okobeng

Vivian Jill Lawrence (born September 11, 1983) is a Ghanaian Kumawood actress and philanthropist. She made her debut in the film Daakyee Asem and has since then appeared in many Ghanaian movies such as Kayayo, Adom, Sekina, Red Card and others.

== Career ==
Apart from being a Kumawood actress, she has also engaged with other production houses.

== Personal life ==
Lawrence was born on 11 September 1983 in Kano, Nigeria to a Scottish father and a Ghanaian mother. Lawrence returned to Ghana when she was eight years, where she completed her primary and secondary education. She gave birth to her first son, Clinton when she was 15 years. She had another male child called Alfie. According to Lawrence, she said she will not spend any amount of money on the man that she loves. Vivian Jill Lawrence married her fellow actor Don Kingsley Yamoah. Some of their colleague actors and actresses attended the wedding.

== Controversy ==
Lawrence opposes the allegations that most actresses are engaged in prostitution due to collapse of the Ghana movie industry. She said that after an actor and producer, Kwame Borga said that over 70 percent of Kumawood actresses are now into prostitution. She said, "apart from acting some of us have things doing" and even said how she started loading charcoal to Tema.

== Philanthropy ==
Lawrence, who is also the CEO of Jill Foundation built a house and furnished it for an old woman in Bibiani Ayeresu, located in the Western North Region of Ghana.

== Filmography ==
She featured in the following movies.

- Akurasi Burgers 3
- True Color
- Amanumuo Ben Ni
- Di Masem Mame
- Di Masem Mame 2
- Sika Sei Yonkoo
- Sika Sei Yonkoo 2
- Subrukutu Komfo
- You necessity Forgive
- Goldcoast Soldier
- Eye Mi Hu Sekina
- Rebecca
- Cross My Heart
