= Miliky MiCool =

Ghanaian actress (c.1966–2020)

- Born: Beatrice Chinery; 1966
- Died: June 10, 2020 (aged 53–54); Accra
- Occupation: actress
- Years active: 1966 - 2020
- Notable work: Yolo

Beatrice Chinery known as Miliky MiCool (c. 1966 – June 10, 2020) was a Ghanaian actress. She rose to fame in the early 2000s for her role in the television series Kejetia, and later featured in Yolo.

== Career ==
She began her acting career in 1993. MiCool played a role in the popular television series Kejetia in the early 2000s. She went on to feature in other movies including Jamestown Fisherman and Yolo.

== Death ==
MiCool died from complications of hypertension at Korle-Bu Teaching Hospital in Accra on June 10, 2020. MiCool's brother Robert stated that she had been ill for some months but things got worse and she was rushed to the Hospital but died upon arrival.

== Filmography ==
- Kejetia
- Yolo
- Jamestown Fisherman
