= The Good Old Days: The Love of AA =

- Film poster
- Directed by: Kwaw Ansah
- Written by: Kwaw Ansah
- Release date: 19 November 2010
- Country: Ghana
- Languages: English, Akan

The Good Old Days: The Love of AA is a 2010 Ghanaian romance film which tells a story about two friends who fell in love with each other from their days of Senior High School. It was directed by Kwaw Ansah and released in 2010.

== Cast ==
- Albert Jackson-Davis
- Nana Akowa Sackey
- Mawuli Semevo
- Evelyn Ansah Galley
- Van Hatse,
- Aaron Adatsi
- Lois Asare
