= Kumawood =

Ghanaian movie company

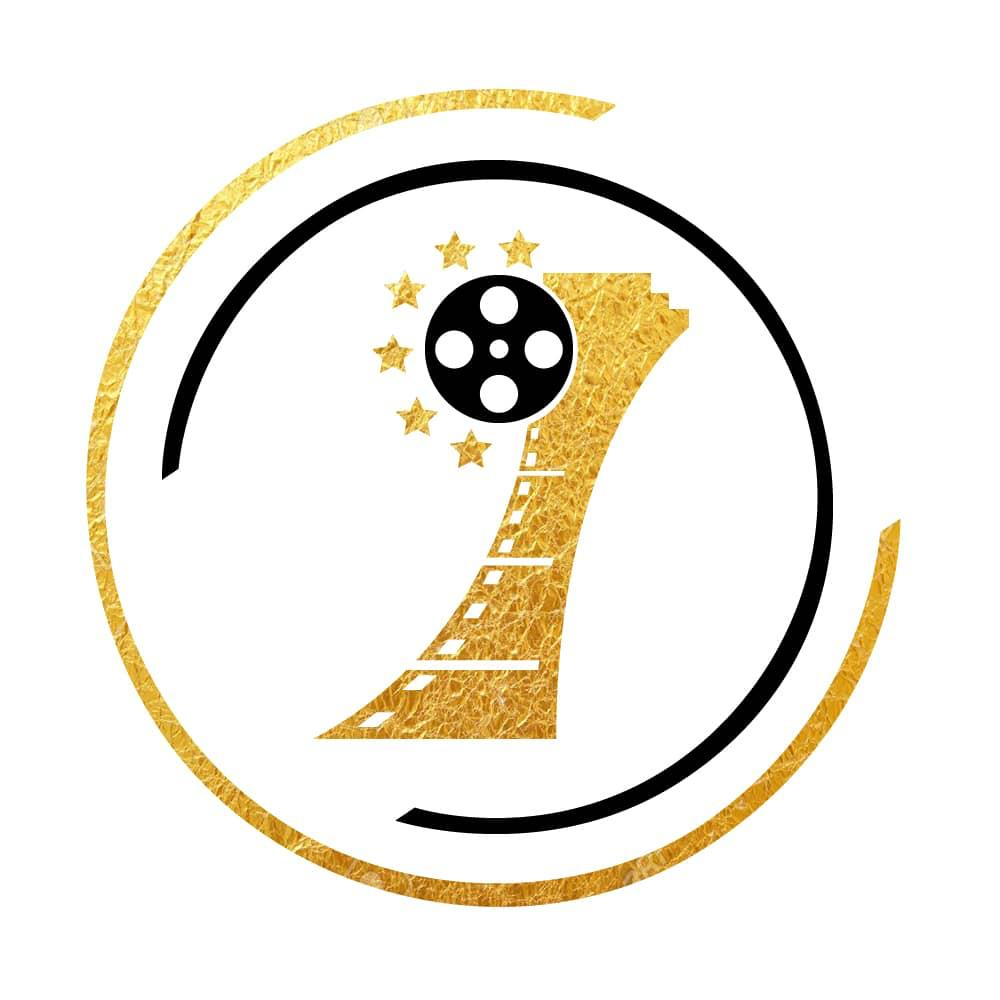
- Type: LLC
- Industry: Film
- Founded: 2006
- Headquarters: Kumasi, Ghana

Kumawood is a privately owned film and awards company based in Kumasi, Ghana. Founded by Samuel Kwabena Darko, a Ghanaian businessman and entrepreneur.

Kumawood was incorporated as a limited liability company in 2006. Soon after, a film industry emerged, eventually becoming a recognizable film company in Ghana.

The language mostly spoken is Asante Twi and subtitles are available.

Kumawood owns a television platform known as Kumawood TV, which airs on Multi TV, as well as the Kumawood app that has been installed more than 100,000 times.

By the late 2010s, Kumawood experienced a significant decline in film production. Producers and distributors interviewed by The Spectator attributed the downturn to factors including increased competition from foreign television dramas, the growth of digital television, film piracy, limited access to financing, declining DVD sales, and inadequate copyright enforcement. Several producers reported a sharp reduction in DVD sales and stated that many film makers had ceased production or diversified into other businesses. Actor Kwadwo Nkansah (Lil Win) also cited the effects of Ghana's power crisis ("dumsor") and the relocation of film distributors from the Kejetia market in Kumasi as contributing factors to the industry's decline.

In the 2026 national budget, the government of Ghana allocated ¢20million as seed funding for the Film Fund to support the country's industry, including Kumawood and other film associations. During the budget presentation, Finance Minister Cassiel Ato Forson stated that the allocation was intended to help revive the film industry. The budget also earmarked ¢20million for the Creative Arts Fund to support the broader creative sector. The funding was announced following a prolonged decline in Kumawood's film production, which has been attributed by industry observers and media reports to factors including digital streaming, film piracy, reduced investment, and changes in distribution.

== Kumawood actors ==
Kumawood actors include the following:

- Kofi Adu (Agya Koo)
- Kwadwo Nkansah
- Nana Ama McBrown
- Emelia Brobbey
- Akrobeto
- Kyeiwaa
- Mercy Asiedu
- Vivian Jill Lawrence
- Ebenezer Donkor
- Bob Santo
- Judas
- Kwaku Manu
- Yaw Dabo
- Wayoosi
