= Veronica Quarshie =

Ghanaian director and producer

- Born: Veronica Martha Agowa Quarshie
- Citizenship: Ghanaian
- Education: National Film and Television Institute
- Occupations: Producer, director and screenwriter,
- Years active: 1994- till present
- Notable work: 1994 - Twin Lover; 1995 - Tears of Joy; 1996 - Come Back Lucy

Veronica Martha Agowa Quarshie is a Ghanaian veteran producer, director and screenwriter, known to have changed the then status quo of storylines where women were portrayed as back benchers. She changed the narrative of women from an obscure, stilted and gender imbalanced story lines to women who owned their space.

== Education ==
Quarshie had her training in movie production from the National Film and Television Institute in 1992, where she graduated with a major in Film Directing.

== Career ==
After graduating, Quarshie began her career as a film producer. She produced her first movie, Twin Lover, by Piro Production in 1994. Since then, she has produced several others including the award-winning Ripples and A Stab in the Dark. She has worked with big companies such as the Ghana Broadcasting Corporation, TV Africa, Film Africa Limited and Princess Films in Accra. She has served and is still serving currently on the jury of several award schemes including the Golden Movie Awards.

== Awards and recognition ==
She has won several awards for her work. Some of the awards she has won include:

- 1992 - Best Student Directing Award - National Film and Television Institute Awards
- 2001 - Best Film Directing Award - Ghana Film Awards
- 2002 - Best Film Directing Award - Ghana Film Awards

== Works ==
Some of the movies she produced include:

- 1994 - Twin Lover
- 1995 - Tears of Joy
- 1996 - Come Back Lucy
- 1997 - Thicker Than Blood
- 1999 - A Stab in the Dark
- 2000 - A Stab in the Dark 2
- 2000 - Ripples: A Stab in the Dark 3
- 2000 - The 3rd Night
- 2000 - Shadows from the Past
- 2001 - A Call at Midnight
- 2003 - Rage: Ripples 2
- Otilia and Xcapades
- 2017 - Forbidden Fruit

== Personal life ==
She is married to Samuel Nai with a son.
