= A Country Called Ghana =

2024 Ghanaian film

- Directed by: Frank Fiifi Ghabin
- Starring: Kwadwo Nkansah, Ramsey Nouah, Charles Awurum, Tonyhans, Paa George, Victor Osuagwu
- Release date: 2024
- Country: Ghana
- Languages: English; Twi

A Country Called Ghana is a 2024 Ghanaian film directed by Frank Fiifi Ghabin and produced by Kwadwo Nkansah.

== Plot ==
A European, Frank, and his three accomplices plan to infiltrate a remote Ghanaian village and steal a sacred totem known as Kankan Nyame. They pose as missionaries offering aid to rural communities to gain the villagers' trust with the help of Prof, the only English speaker in the village. While maintaining their cover, they secretly search for the totem, believed to possess supernatural powers. After several failed attempts due to its mystical powers, they reveal their true intentions to Prof. Enticed by the promise of wealth, Prof agrees to assist them and enlists Adwubi, daughter of the village chief priest, who is love-struck with Frank. They gain access to the totem, setting off a chain of events that test loyalty, belief, and cultural heritage.

== Cast ==
- Kwadwo Nkansah as Prof
- Ramsey Nouah as Frank
- Janet Brefo Yankson as Adwubi
- Charles Awurum
- Victor Osuagwu
- Tonyhans
- Paa George
- Afriyie Forson
- Michael Afranie
- Tony Hans as Mario
