= Kwame Dzokoto =

Ghanaian comedian, actor and politician (1974/1975–2026)

- Born: 1974 or 1975
- Died: 22 October 2026 (aged 51); Tarkwa, Ghana
- Occupations: Comedian, actor, politician
- Known for: Edziban
- Political party: National Democratic Congress

Seth Kwame Dzokoto (1974 or 1975 – 22 October 2026), also known as Judge Koboo, was a Ghanaian comedian, actor and politician. He was the host of the Edziban show on TV3; which explores Ghanaian food joints and cuisines.

== Politics ==
Dzokoto contested on the ticket of National Democratic Congress during the 2016 Ghanaian general elections in the Tarkwa-Nsuaem constituency but lost to George Mireku Duker of the New Patriotic Party.

== Death ==
On 22 October 2026, Dzokoto collapsed during a live radio discussion, at Owass Radio in Tarkwa, and was pronounced dead on arrival at hospital. He was 51.

== Filmography ==
- Efiewura
- Edziban TV Show
