= Islamic Senior High School, Kumasi =

Senior high school in Ghana

Islamic Senior High School
- Abrepo, Ashanti Region; Ghana

Information
- Type: Secondary/high school
- Established: c. 1969
- Grades: Forms 1-3
- Nickname: Asotiefo

Islamic Senior High School is an educational institution located in Abrepo, a suburb of Kumasi in the Ashanti Region of Ghana established in 1969

It is a mixed gender school, and is in the grade B school category in Ghana. It offers both day and boarding options.

== History ==
The school originated as a private senior high school but transitioned into the public school system during the 2009/2010 academic year. The concept to establish this institution was initiated by members of the Ghana Muslim Mission (Ashanti) including Alhaji Mohammed Yeboah, Alhaji Adam Seth, Alhaji Yusuf Nyamekye, Alhaji Ibrahim Baryeh, Alhaji Gyamfi, Yakubu Mensa, Sheikh Adam Appiedu, Papa Adam Dwomoh, Alhaji Kweku Kru, Mallam Abubakar, Kramo Siaka Sam Boakye, Alhaji Maama, and Alhaji Musah Kofi Nuamah. The primary objective was to address the educational needs of youth, particularly Muslims, who lacked access to secondary education. Initially, in 1967, the school enrolled thirteen students, with only one female student. Sheik Fadul-Rahman from Pakistan was appointed as the first headmaster in 1967.

== Goals ==
The school's mission is to provide quality Islamic and secular education through Islamic disciplinary code and ethics without discrimination.

Its vision is to become an institution of excellence for training students to be self-reliant, responsible and God fearing through a firm and sound foundation.

== Programs ==
- General Science
- General Arts
- Business
- Visual Arts
- Home Economics

== School facilities ==
- Science Lab
- ICT Lab
