= Kumasi Girls Senior High School =

Location
- P. O. Box KS, Kumasi; Abrepo Kumasi; Ashanti Region; Kumasi; Ghana

Information
- School type: Public high school, all-girls
- Motto: Semper Fidelis
- Religious affiliation: Christianity - Methodist
- Founded: 1953
- Founder: Caxton Williams
- Status: Active
- Oversight: Ministry of Education
- Chaplain: Sophia Nyarko Manu
- Gender: Girls
- Age: 14 to 18
- Classes offered: General Arts, General Science, Business, Home Economics, Visual Arts
- Houses: 7
- Colours: Blue and white
- Nickname: KUGISS
- USNWR ranking: First Choice
- Alumni: AHEMAA

Kumasi Girls Senior High School is located at Abrepo, a suburb of Kumasi in the Ashanti region of Ghana. The school is adjacent to the county hospital and came into government administration in 1963 catering to students in Ashanti region.

In November 2023, the school celebrated its 60th anniversary. At that time, the high school had 3,200 students.

== History ==
The school was started as a private secondary school for girls by Caxton Williams, a Sierra Leonean, in 1953. Kumasi Girls' Senior High School (KUGISS) was first situated at Susanso, near Bomso Junction on the Kumasi-Accra road. In the early 1960s, the proprietor moved the school to Old Tafo where it remained in rented premises until 1992 when the school was moved to its present and permanent site at Abrepo. The government took over the administration of the school in 1963.

== Alliance ==
Kumasi Girls maintains an ongoing alliance with their boys' school, Kumasi High School, called MMRAHEMMAA.

In September 2024, the school got mechanized water project with the support of Young Visionary Leaders, Ghana.
