= Kyekyekule =

Ghanaian kids program

Kyekyekule is a kids' program that aired during the early 1990s, it was directed and produced by George Liang or Uncle George and team. This program was often aired on GTV.
