= Ghanata Senior High School =

Senior High School

Coordinates: 5.88907°N 0.09943°W

Ghanata Senior High School is a boarding public senior high school located in Dodowa in the Greater Accra Region of Ghana.

Founded by Rev. Isaac. Doe. Osabutey-Aguedze in 1936, initially in Adidome as Gold Coast People College in the Volta region of Ghana.

The school later moved to its present location in Dodowa where it established its permanent campus. The motto of the school is "Carpe Diem", which means "Seize the Day", or to make the most of the present time.

School type	mixed public high school
Founded	1936; 86 years ago
Founder	Rev. I. D. Osabutey-Aguedze
Status	Active
School district	Shai Osudoku District
Oversight	Ghana Education Service
Authorizer	Ministry of Education
Forms	1-3
Gender	Boys and Girls
Education system	Senior high school
Language	English
Color(s)	Yellow and Blue
Slogan	Anyemei
Alumni	Ghanata Old Students Association (Members are called Anyemei)

== Notable alumni ==
- Nana Toa Akwatia II, Ghanaian politician
- Pascaline Edwards, actress
- Godwin Kotey, Ghanaian actor
- Millison Narh, Ghanaian banker, Former Deputy Governor Of Bank of Ghana
- Hon. Linda Obenewaa Akweley Ocloo, MP and Minister for Greater Accra
- Kwadwo Baah Agyemang, Ghanaian politician former MP Asante Akim North constituency

== School Code ==
0010401

== School Motto ==
Carpe Diem

== School Category ==
Category B
