= Azonto Ghost =

- Directed by: Mustapha Adams
- Release date: 2012
- Country: Ghana
- Language: Akan

Azonto Ghost is a Ghanaian movie that features Liwin as the main character. In the movie he was killed by his sibling because their dad left a large chunk of his inheritance for him. His ghost haunted them and killed them one after the other. When he was alive, he loves to dance Azonto. So anytime he launches an attack on any of his relatives he has to dance first.

== Cast ==
- Kwadwo Nkansah (Liwin) as Adade
- Kojo Poku as Nana Nkankom
- Bill Asamoah as Ampong
- Mabel Ametor as Ama
- Martha Joyce as Afrakoma
- Reagan Nana as Samuel
- Patricia Bentum as Kwakyewa
- Kwame Boakye as Asadu
- Comfort Fobi as Fobi
- Mercy Heyford as Adjoa
- Benedicta Ghafa

== In popular culture ==
The meme "Oh my God, Wow!" originated from this movie. When a woman informs that she is "pregnant for 3 good months". Liwin's dad says "Oh my God, Wow!".
