= A Stab in the Dark (film) =

1999 film dir. Veronica Quarshie

- Directed by: Veronica Quarshie
- Release date: 1999
- Country: Ghana
- Language: English

A Stab in the Dark is a 1999 English language Ghanaian movie produced by Bam Nemesia, Ltd. and directed by Veronica Quarshie. It was a financial and critical success, winning Best Film at the Ghana Movie Awards in 2000.

== Plot ==
A lady is betrayed when her best friend, starts a relationship with her father after the family helps her by taking her in.

This five film series (A Stab in the Dark 1,2, Ripples: A Stab in Dark 3, Ripples 2, and Ripples 3) follows the lives of young women in domestic dramas and represents a variation of the social issues in drama.

In A Stab in the Dark, the main character, Effe, is a pretty young woman who prefers dating much older, usually married men. Effe leaves her home to escape her mother's criticism of her behavior and stays with her friend's family.

While at her friend Kate's house, Effe has an affair with Kate's father and ruins the dynamics of that family.

Eventually, in the fifth film, Effe decides to turn her life around and instead of ruining families and marriages, helps save a marriage and regains her friendship with Kate.

== Cast ==
- Psalm Adjeteyfio
- Pascaline Edwards
- Edinam Atatsi
- Kwame Owusu-Ansah
- Naana Hayford
- Mawuli Semevo
- Grace Omaboe
- Agnes Dapaah
- Nat Banini
- Wendy Nortey
- Henry Nartey
- Abeiku Nyame (Jagger Pee)
- Abeiku Acquah
- Yvonne Boakye

== Sequels ==
A Stab in the Dark is the first in a series of five short films all directed by Veronica Quarshie and released between 1999 and 2003.

- A Stab in the Dark (1999)
- A Stab in the Dark 2 (2000)
- Ripples: A Stab in the Dark 3 (2000)
- Ripples 2 (2000)
- Rage: Ripples 3 (2003)

== Analysis ==
A Stab in the Dark and its sequels are noted for focusing on male infidelity as a source of familial conflict, a plot device not commonly used in Ghanaian and Nigerian cinema.

== Reception ==
A Stab in the Dark and its sequels are considered to be among Quarshie's best and most significant work. A Stab in the Dark was financially successful and won several awards, including Best Film at the Ghana Movie Awards in 2000.
