= Like Cotton Twines =

- Directed by: Leila Djansi
- Starring: Irene Adotey; Adjetey Anang; Miranda Bailey; David Dontoh; Ophelia Klenam Dzidzornu; Jay Ellis; Aiyanna Johns; Ludwig Mawuli Kalms; Luckei E. Lawson; Yvonne Okoro; Mawuli Semevo
- Release date: 2016
- Country: United States
- Language: English

Like Cotton Twines is a 2016 film written and directed by Ghanaian-American filmmaker Leila Djansi. The film was an official selection to the 2016 Los Angeles Film Festival under the World Fiction section. It went on to win the best narrative feature at the Savannah Film Festival in 2016.

== Plot ==
An American volunteer teaching at a remote school in Africa tries to save one of his young students from a religious custom in which she will be offered as a slave to the gods.

== Cast ==
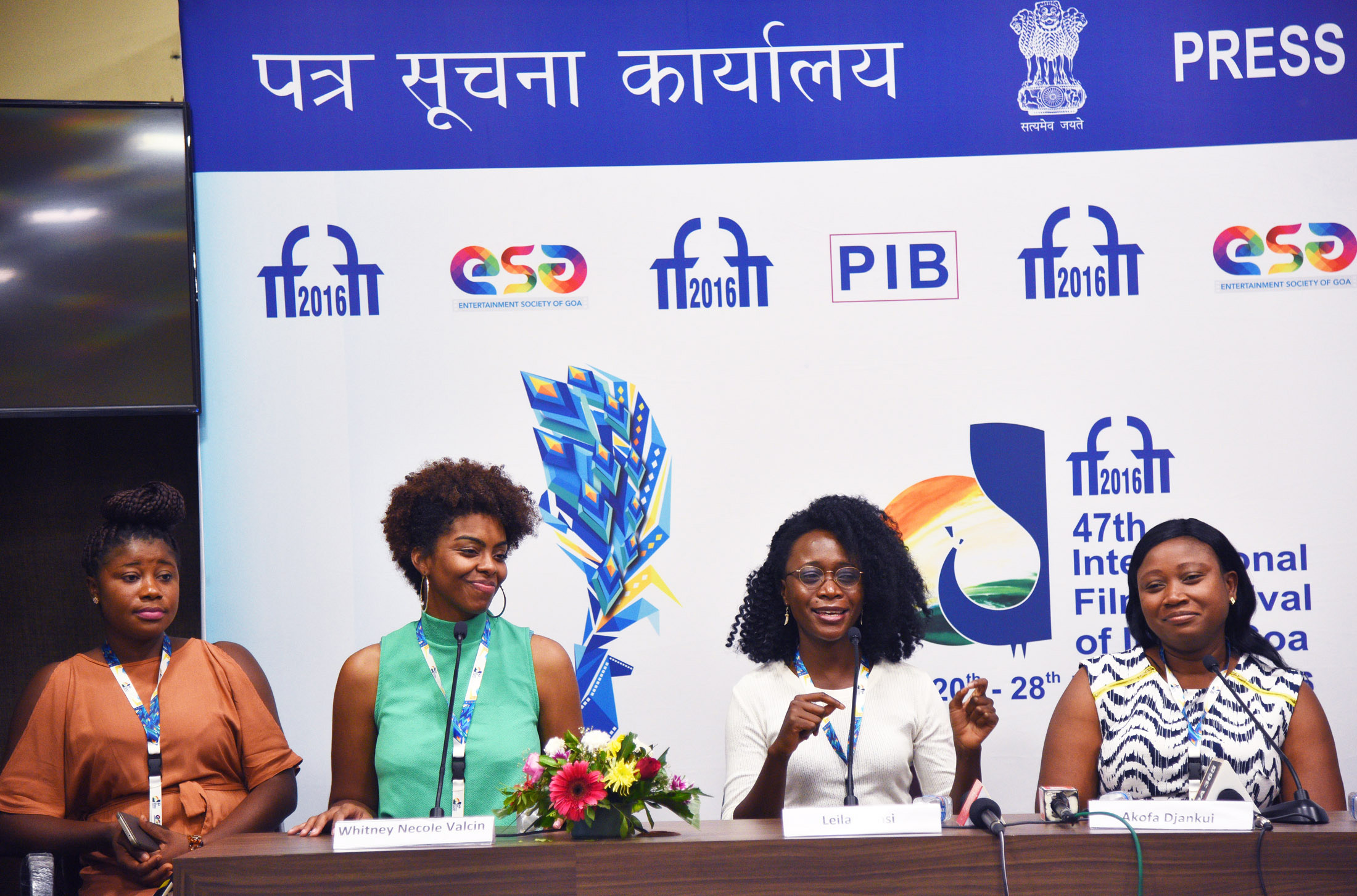
Film crew at IFFI (2014)

- Irene Adotey as Felicia
- Adjetey Anang as Gideon
- Miranda Bailey as Allison Dean
- Brian Angels as Social Worker
- David Dontoh as Father Baani
- Ophelia Klenam Dzidzornu
- Jay Ellis as Micha Brown
- Aiyanna Johns as Tulip
- Ludwig Mawuli Kalms as Teacher Francis
- Luckie E. Lawson as Ajovi
- Yvonne Okoro as Sarah
- Mawuli Semevo as Yema
