= Kwaku Manu =

Ghanaian actor

- Born: March 6, 1984 (age 42); Obuasi
- Other name: Bob sika
- Occupations: Actor, musician, presenter
- Children: 4

Kwaku Manu (born March 6, 1984) is a Ghanaian actor, musician and presenter. He is the son of Agya Yaw Nimo, a shoemaker and a trader from Amankyem in the Ashanti Region of Ghana. Kwaku Manu grew up in Kumasi with his siblings and attended school in the city before dropping out during Junior High School to work with his father in the shoemaking trade. In the year 2012 he released his first single ''E'nfa nhoahoa ho''. Beyond acting and music, Kwaku Manu is also an entrepreneur. He is the owner of KM Perfumes located at Madina, opposite the Fire Service station.

== Personal life ==
Kwaku Manu was born and raised in Obuasi, Ashanti Region Of Ghana. He is divorced and has 4 children.

== Career ==
Kwaku Manu began his acting career in the Kumawood film industry and gained wider recognition after joining Agya Koo's Tete Mmofra Film Production. He made his screen debut in the film Aware So and has since appeared in numerous Ghanaian films, particularly in comic roles. In addition to acting, Kwaku Manu is a YouTuber, musician, and entrepreneur. He hosts Aggressive Interview on his YouTube Channel Kwaku Manu TV, where he interviews personalities from Ghana's entertainment industry and beyond. As a musician, Kwaku Manu has released several songs and collaborated with Ghanaian artistes including Fameye, Kuami Eugene, Kwaku Darlington, and Odehyie Ba.

== Filmography ==
He has been featured on several movies like:

- Who Is Your Guy? (2023) as James
- Baby Mama (2019) as Sammy
- The List (2017)
- Purple (2016) as Kwaku
- Ohia Asona Wo (2014) as Yaw Paul
- Susubiribi (2013)
- Mirror Girl (2012)
- Ewiase Ahennie (2011) as Asamoah
- Mallam Issah (2010) as Cantona
- Terminator Atrimoden (2010)
- The Man With The Burning First
- Libya Akwantuo (2009)
- The Great Battle 2.
- Who is Stronger?
- The Twin Spirit 3
- Kwaku Azonto

== Awards and nomination ==
He was nominated as Favorite Actor in the Ghana Movie Awards 2019 Edition.

== Philanthropic work ==
In December 2014, the actor through his Kwaku Manu Foundation partnered with Adom Boateng Foundation to donate some bags of rice and cooking oil to widows in Kumasi.

In the year 2016 Kwaku Manu went in to support his colleague actress Emelia Brobbey on her SAVE THE ORPHAN program which made a lot of impact.

In 2025, Kwaku Manu donated a parcel of land to female actor Adwoa Smart to help her build a new home. In addition to the parcel of land, he also donated bags of cement to help her start the construction of the home.

== Features ==
=== Movies ===
- Aboagye Brenya
- Agya Koo
- Lil Win
- Mercy Aseidu
