= Mawuli Semevo =

Ghanaian actor (1962–2025)

- Born: Mawuli Yaw Semevo; 1962; Ghana
- Died: 20 February 2025 (aged 62–63)
- Citizenship: Ghanaian
- Occupation: Actor
- Years active: 1980–2025
- Notable work: A Stab in the Dark; Like Cotton Twines; The Good Old Days: The Love of AA; Yolo

Mawuli Yaw Semevo (1962 – 20 February 2025) was a Ghanaian actor.

== Early life ==
Semevo was born in Chorkor, attended Cambridge Preparatory School, then later moved to Presbyterian Training College where he discovered he had a passion for acting.

== Career ==
Semevo began his acting career in 1980, by featuring in a stage play which led him to join the Ghana Theatre Club in 1981 at the Art Centre. He worked at National Theatre. He played the role of Baba Fakunle, adapting Ola Rotimi’s The Gods Are Not to Blame.

== Death ==
Semevo died at the Ridge Hospital on 20 February 2025 as a result of injuries sustained in a fire accident.

== Filmography ==
- Harvest at 17
- A Stab in the Dark
- Escape of Love
- Like Cotton Twines
- The Good Old Days: The Love of AA
- Cargo (2006)
- The Lost Stool (1997)
- Yolo
- Foriwaa
- Firestorm
- Bishop Handle Stick
- Tiger of Liberation
