= Eddie Donkor =

Ghanaian highlife musician (1942–1995)

- Also known as: Senior Eddie Donkor; Eddie Donkor Senior; King of Rhythm Power
- Born: 6 March 1942; Akropong, Gold Coast
- Died: 1995
- Genre: Highlife
- Occupation: Musician
- Instruments: Guitar, vocals

Edward Kofi Donkor (1942–1995) was a Ghanaian highlife musician. He was popularly referred to as Senior Eddie Donkor or Eddie Donkor Senior.

== Early life ==
Eddie Donkor was born at Akropong in the Eastern Region of the Gold Coast (now Ghana) on 6 March 1942. His basic education was at the Akropong Presbyterian School. He was keen on music from his youth.

== Music career ==
Eddie Donkor's group was the African Brothers Band which was inaugurated at the Park Cinema in Accra in 1963. The original members of the group were Eddie Donkor (vocals and rhythm guitar), Patrick Ampadu (Paa-Still), Rover Kofi Amoh, Maxwell Teacher Boateng, A. Koo Ofori, Kwame Anim, Nana Nyarko, Yaw Asante and Yaw Owusu. He later left this group to form his own group, Senior Eddie Donkor and The Asiko Internationals Band. One of the successful founders from this group is Nana Kwame Ampadu (Patrick Ampadu) who also became a very successful highlife artist.

He was one of the most established highlife music performers in Ghana and toured various countries including the United States. Eddie Donkor's live bands played at some of the prestigious venues in Ghana during the height of his fame. Similar to most live bands at the time, performances were often interspersed with comedy during interludes. Popular comedians like Bob Okala often toured with Senior Eddie Donkor.

Most of his songs were sung in Twi. Some of them were sung in more than one language. "Corner Fast," "Maye Hot," and "New King, New Law" all feature more than one language in the song.

== Family ==
Donkor's daughter, Abena Nyarteh also went into music in the 1980s.

== Death ==
Eddie Donkor died on the 24th of April, 1995. He was buried at his hometown of Akropong.

== Discography ==
=== Singles ===
- Ampokyekye
- Destiny
- D.K. Poison Mo
- Na Me Cause Am
- Woka Bi A Tie

=== Albums and compilations ===
Eddie Donkor released a number of albums mainly with his group the Internationals.

- Asiko Darling (LP)
- Asiko Guys (LP) – also featuring Major Baah on Odo Nsuo
- Eye Banker (LP)
- King Of Rhythm Power (LP) (1972) Gapophone Records
- Menom Kooko (LP)
- N.C.N.C. No Contribution No Chop – CD compilation
- Wo Nso Try (LP)
- Yebu Didi (1990) Agya Paye Records.
