= Godwin Nii Dzanie Kotey =

Ghanaian Boxing Trainer

- Born: 1956
- Died: 2016 (aged 59–60)
- Occupation: Boxing Coach

Godwin Nii Dzanie Kotey (1956-2016) also known as Alloway was a Ghanaian boxing trainer who has trained top boxers and also contributed to the growth of the industry.

== Career ==
Alloway was the head trainer of the Attoh Quarshie Gym in Accra where he trained many boxers and lightweight boxer George "Red Tiger" Ashie. He was also the trainer of Joshua Klottey, Azumah Nelson, Joseph Agbeko and many more.

He led the boxing coaches of Ghana where they made various reforms in the boxing fraternity.
