= Godwin Kotey =

Ghanaian actor

- Born: Godwin Nikoi Kotey; 1965
- Died: 2012 (aged 46–47)
- Education: University of Southern Illinois; University of Ghana
- Occupations: Actor, lecturer

Godwin Nikoi Kotey (1965–2012) was a Ghanaian actor, producer, educator, playwright, and director.

== Early life ==
Godwin Kotey's artistic journey started in the Ghanaian television industry, where he initially gained recognition. His first significant role was in the Ghana Broadcasting Corporation’s production, Anane – A Strange Coincidence. This role marked the beginning of his career in the entertainment industry, leading him to appear in various TV theatre productions, where he continued to build his reputation as a talented actor.

== Education ==
He attended Tema Senior High School and Ghanata Secondary School. He then furthered his studies at the University of Ghana for his degree and master's in theatre arts and did his Phd at the University of Southern Illinois.

== Academic contributions ==
Kotey made notable contributions to academia, particularly at the University of Ghana's School of Performing Arts. In 1989, while studying there, he directed Witness for the Prosecution, a production that received acclaim by being selected as the School's Theatre Season Play of the Year. This accomplishment highlighted his directorial skills and marked a pivotal moment in his academic career. He later became a Senior Lecturer at the university, where he played a significant role in mentoring the next generation of Ghanaian performers.

== Career ==
Godwin lectured at the University of Ghana, where he taught Performing Arts. In 1997 1997 he directed Smash TV and also Taxi Driver in 1999. In 2008, he was the creative director for the opening and closing ceremony of the 2008 Africa Cup of Nations.

== Contributions to theater and film ==
Kotey's impact on theater and film in Ghana was significant. After his success in television, he joined Abibigromma, the University of Ghana's resident theatre company, where he further developed his craft. His work in film includes well-known titles such as Police Officer, Sodom and Gomorrah, and I Sing of a Well. His directorial debut in film, Scent of Danger, was a critical success, earning him an award at the African Film Festival (FESPACO) in Burkina Faso in 2001, which further solidified his reputation as a talented filmmaker.

== Filmography ==
List of movies.

- Police Officer
- I Sing of A Well
- Taxi Driver
- The Scent of Danger
- Etuo Etu Bare
- Sodom and Gomorrah
- Shoe Shine Boy

== Awards ==
- He won an award for the film, The Scent of Danger at the African Film Festival in Burkina Faso – FESPACO in 2001.
- He also took the best awards for the TV series Taxi Driver

== Legacy and later life ==
Kotey's influence extended beyond his roles in film and theater. He was also responsible for the creative direction of the opening and closing ceremonies of the 2008 African Cup of Nations in Ghana, showcasing his versatility and creativity. His legacy is remembered both for his artistic contributions and his role as an educator, impacting many in the field of performing arts. Kotey continued to contribute to the arts until he died in 2012, leaving behind a lasting legacy.

== Death ==
He died of cancer – leukemia, after he had treatment in the United States.
