= Abrepo =

- Urban area
- Nickname: Abrepo Kesse/Kuma
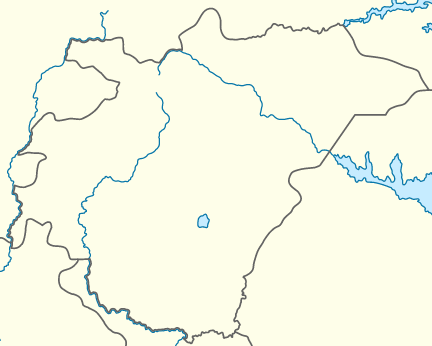
- Location within Ashanti Location within Ghana
- Country: Ghana
- Region: Ashanti Region
- District: Kumasi Metropolitan District
- Time zone: GMT
  - Summer (DST): GMT

Abrepo is a suburb of Kumasi in the Ashanti Region of Ghana. It is situated within the city of Kumasi, which is the second-largest city in Ghana and serves as the regional capital of the Ashanti Region. It is also the location for Kumasi Girls Senior High School and Islamic Senior High School, Kumasi.
