= 2016 (2010 film) =

- Promotional release poster
- Mmienu zero biako asia
- Directed by: Samuel K. Nkansah
- Written by: Samuel K. Nkansah
- Screenplay by: Samuel K. Nkansah
- Story by: Samuel K. Nkansah
- Based on: 2012
- Produced by: Samuel K. Nkansah
- Starring: Rose Mensah; Ebenezer Donkor; Emmanuel Afriyie; Osei Joseph; Priscilla Anabel; Baptiste Moureau; Nadhir Haouzi
- Cinematography: Samuel K. Nkansah
- Edited by: Samuel K. Nkansah
- Music by: Samuel K. Nkansah
- Animation by: For the 3D animation for the creatures Samuel K. Nkansah
- Production company: Ninja Movie Production
- Distributed by: Ninja Movie Production
- Release date: 2010
- Running time: 151 minutes (two parts, 75.5 minutes each)
- Country: Ghana
- Language: Akan
- Budget: Estimated GH₵0
- Box office: Unknown

2016 is a 2010 Ghanaian direct-to-video science-fiction action film directed by the pseudonymous director Ninja, a.k.a. Samuel K. Nkansah. The film takes place in the year 2010 and follows Ghanaians who must survive a group of hostile aliens who invade Accra in the hopes of colonizing the world by the year 2016. The movie has become known for its bizarre trailer and its low-budget visual effects.

== Cast ==
- Rose Mensah as Maa Dorcas
- Ebenezer Donkor as Mr. Oppong
- Francis Annan as Benedict Veerga
- Osei Joseph as Johnson
- Musaev Ibrahim as Cara
- Fabio Pardo as the student
- Baptiste Moureau as the Terminator
- Nadhir Haouzi as the Alien
- Robin Collard was in the casting
- Eric K. Adu as Thomas
- Elizabeth Akomaah as Millina
- Elizabeth Yeboah as Becca
- Mohammed Ismeal as Kofi
- Cindy Oduro as Rose

== Release ==
2016 first gained notice in 2011 when a trailer for the film was uploaded to YouTube. The Huffington Post called the trailer "bizarre and wonderful", while Cyriaque Lamar of io9 described it as "basically Alien, Predator, and Terminator all rolled into one". The trailer was shown on a 2015 episode of the late-night talk show Conan, featuring guest T. J. Miller. The movie was split into two parts, as is the norm of the direct-to-video market in West Africa.
