= Clifford Amon Kotey =

Ghanaian diplomat

Amb. Clifford Amon Kotey

Ghana Ambassador to the Kingdom of Morocco
- In office 2009–2013
- President: John Atta Mills
- Preceded by: Kobina Annan
- Succeeded by: Samuel Mbrayeh Quartey

Personal details
- Born: Clifford Nii Amon Kotey Ghana

Clifford Nii Amon Kotey, also known as Nii Kotey Amon III, is a Ghanaian diplomat and a traditional ruler. He was Ghana's ambassador to Morocco from 2009 to 2013. He is currently the Asere Djaasetse of the Ga ethnic group.

Kotey was a Ghanaian foreign service personnel. He began at the Ministry of Foreign Affairs serving as the Assistant Secretary of the Ministry of Foreign Affairs in the 1980s, and Counsellor for political affairs in Ghana's permanent mission to the United Nations in the early 1990s. Prior to his appointment as Ghana's ambassador to Morocco, he served as the acting Head of Ghana's Mission in Berlin. A year after his retirement from the Ghanaian foreign service, he was enstooled Asere Djaasetse, the head of the council responsible for selecting the king for the Ga state.
