= Adeline Ama Buabeng =

Ghanaian actress and storyteller

- Born: Ghana
- Other names: Aunty Ama
- Occupation(s): Actress and storyteller

Adeline Ama Buabeng, also known as Aunty Ama, is a Ghanaian actress and storyteller. For over three decades she "worked at the cutting edge of popular theatre with the Brigade Concert Party and Kusam Agoromba".

Buabeng started as a part-time member of the Workers' Brigade Concert Party, performing traditional dances such as the Atsiaghekor, Adowa or Takai before becoming a full-time actress.
