= Kofi Adu =

Ghanaian actor and comedian

- Born: Kofi Adu; 25 May 1969 (age 56); Ghana
- Other name: Agya koo
- Occupations: Actor and comedian
- Known for: Black star, away bus, three desperate friends, Kumasi Yonko, Business partner
- Spouses: Victoria Owusu Adomako (divorced); Rita Asiedu (m. 2016)
- Awards: National Award by then-Ghanaian President John Agyekum Kufuor

Alexander Kofi Adu (born May 25, 1969) is a Ghanaian actor and comedian. Also known as Agya Koo, Kofi Adu is a very renowned Kumawood actor and has appeared in over 200 Ghanaian movies including Obaatanpa, Away Bus, Black Star, and Ma Tricki Wo (I have tricked you). He is originally from the Ashanti region of Ghana but lived in a suburb in Accra Newtown called Asantewaa.

== Career ==
Kofi Adu hails from the Ashanti Region in Ghana but lived in a suburb in Accra Newtown called Asantewaa. He worked as a cobbler. Kofi Adu was discovered in 1995 on a Ghanaian comedy show (Key Soap Concert Party) on GTV (Ghana National Television) at the National Theater in Accra, where he worked as a comedian warming up the crowd before the main drama was staged. He has maintained the name since then. Although he originally journeyed to Accra to sing.

In July 2008, he was awarded a National Award from the then-Ghanaian President John Agyekum Kufuor. The award is given to individuals who have contributed significantly to society. Adu is considered as one of the few people who have shaped the Ghanaian acting industry. Agya Koo has been featured in over 90 Ghanaian movies, 15 of which remains his favorite.

Avoiding the normal procedure of thoroughly reading a script before acting in films, he told Joy FM's former morning show host Kojo Oppong Nkrumah that while actors and actresses are typically given scripts two weeks before they begin shooting, his God-given talent allows him to improvise without a script.

He has been in movies with Aboagye Brenya, Lil Win, Kwaku Manu, Mercy Aseidu to name a few.

He was once a brand ambassador for Ghana Exim Bank alongside the Ghanaian Dance hall artiste Charles Nii Armarh popularly known as Shatta Wale.

== Personal life ==
In June 2016, Adu got remarried to Rita Asiedu in London, UK after dating for 4 years. He was previously married to Victoria Owusu Adomako but divorced. He is a Christian. He has three(3) children.

== Politics ==
On April 15, 2026, Agya Koo, who is known to have publicly supported the New Patriotic Party in the past, revealed that he will unveil a new political party by the name, Ghana First Party to nullify the NDC NPP dominance in Ghana's politics.

The veteran actor is of the view that this will break the longstanding grip of NPP and NDC on Ghana's political space. He says, "We all know that the two biggest political parties in the country, the NPP and the NDC, always dominate the political space. As a result, if not NPP then NDC will win power. That is why we have thought about it to bring a third force to compete with them. We are bringing a party that thinks about the traders, a party that can bring tourism and all developments."

== Net worth ==
The Ghanaian famed actor has a current estimated net worth between $500,000 and $700,000. His net worth makes him one of the wealthiest actors in Ghana. He accrued all his fortune from his tall list of movie roles, endorsements, sponsorships, and other endeavors. He owns a music band and film production studio named Tetemmofra (ancient children). He has been featured in over 100 movies. He unveiled his new mansion on the 4th June 2023 in Kumasi.

== Filmography ==
- Key Soap Concert Party
- Agya Koo Gbegbentus
- Three Desperate Friends
- House of Commotion
- Evil Heart (2008) – John
- Kumasi Yonko (meaning – Kumasi Friendship) (2002)
- Obi nnim awie ye (meaning – No one knows the end)
- Ka wonan toso (meaning – Sit properly)
- Asew 419A (meaning – In-law 419A)
- Business Partner
- Gyina Pintin (meaning – Stand Firm)
- Bone So Akatua (meaning – Rewards of Evil)
- Obaatanpa (meaning – Good Mother)
- Black Star (2006)
- Otan Hunu Kwah
- Ma Tricki Wo (meaning – I have tricked you)
- Agya Koo Trotro Driver (2012)
- Joni Waka (2012) – Paa Nii
- Ohia (meaning – Poverty)
- Away Bus (2019) – Moses
- Nsem Pii (meaning – Many Issues)
- Sure banker
- Bosom Ba
- Kwadwo Besiah
- Sika ye Mogya
- Nyame Bekyere1&2
- Agya Koo Mechanic
- Aburokyire Abrabo (meaning – Life Abroad)
- Agya Koo Bank Manager
- Asem Aba Fie (meaning – An Issue at Home)
- Kankan Nyame
- Onyame Asem
- Agya Koo Gyae
- Kayayoo
- My Soldier Father
- Obidea Aba (meaning – It's the turn of another)
- Nnipa Sei Nnipa (meaning – Humans destroy themselves)
