= Kwame Owusu-Ansah =

Ghanaian media personality and actor

- Born: 9 December 1967
- Died: 2 May 2008 (aged 40)
- Occupations: actor, radio broadcaster
- Years active: 1990s - 2008

Kwame Owusu-Ansah or Kwame Owusu Ansah (or John William Kwame Owusu Ansah, 9 December 1967 - 2 May 2008) was a Ghanaian radio broadcaster, actor, poet, Public Relations Consultant and teacher turned actor who graced the scene of the Ghanaian movie industry through various collaboration with Nigerians and major features in Ghanaian movie.

== Early life ==
Owusu-Ansah was born at Alajo in Accra to Smart Owusu Ansah and Victoria Cosmos Gonsalves on 9 December 1967.

== Career ==
Owusu-Ansah appeared in about 60 movies before he died in 2008. He was also the Media Director of Madhaus Incorporation, a record label and a subsidiary of FNT Group of Companies (FNT Group).

Owusu-Ansah previously served as the Public Relations Officer for Asante Kotoko between 2004 and 2005 and one-time special assistant to the club's former CEO Major Yaw Larson.

== Filmography ==
Selection of movies and TV he appeared in:

- A Stab in the Dark (1999)
- The Visitor (1999) - George
- End of the River
- Errors of the Past
- Wedding Day
- Jewels 1 (1999) - 2nd Elder
- Jewels 2 (2000) - Katawere
- Remember Your Mother (2000) - Linus
- Lost Hope (2000) - Doctor
- Time (2000) - Francis
- Grace to Grass (2001) - Evangelist John
- Married to a Witch (2001) - Michael
- Okukuseku 1,2,3&4 (2001) - Sammy
- That Day (2001) - Mahama
- Sika (2001) - Adae
- Tenterhooks (2002) - Danny
- Christ in Me (2003) - Austine
- Madam Joan (2004) - Freddy
- Holby City (2005 TV Series) - Manu Sembene
- Born Again
- Axe of Vengeance
- Spirit of Darkness
- Fortune Island (TV series)
- Frozen Emotion (2006)
- The Mighty One (2007) - Antwi

== Death ==
He died on 2 May 2008 from injuries sustained from an automobile accident on the Tema Motorway in Accra.

== Scene at his memorial service ==
During his memorial service on 14 June 2008, "another woman aside from his already known mother, Madam Victoria Cosmos Gonsalves who hails from Atsiavi in the Volta region, claimed ownership of Kwame. One Miss Koffie believed to be a native of Cape Coast created a scene outside the church hall wailing and shouting that Kwame is her son." The woman claimed on a radio station that she had evidence proving that the late Owusu-Ansah was her son. When asked by the radio presenter how she met Owusu-Ansah's late father, "Miss Koffie said she was in the brigade and Kwame's father was in the military so they met at Burma Camp where they both lived." On Saturday 28 June 2008, exactly a week after Owusu-Ansah's burial, family members called a press conference and denied the woman's claims.
