= David Oscar Dogbe =

Ghanaian musician, actor and comedian

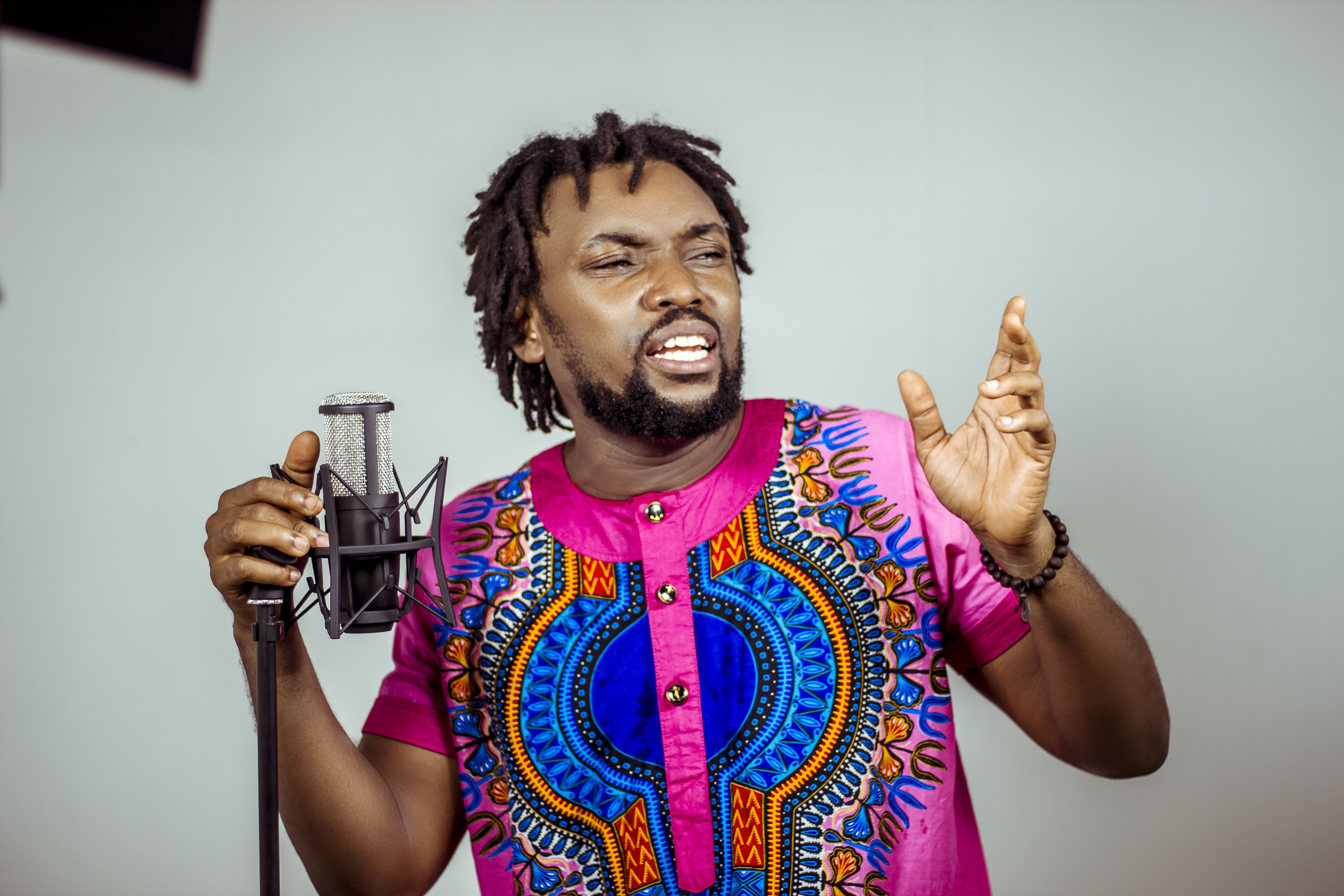
- Born: 16 April 1984 (age 42); Koforidua, Ghana
- Education: University of Ghana
- Occupation: Musician
- Notable work: Laugh a Minute Show on Viasat 1 (now Kwese TV)
- Relatives: 3

David Oscar Dogbe (born 16 April 1984) is a Ghanaian musician, actor and comedian. He is known for leading the movement GHComedy, that fought to gain visibility and acceptance for upcoming Ghanaian Stand-up comedians.

David Oscar later put his comedian career on hold to become a reggae musician. He has collaborated with other popular Ghanaian stars, namely, Afriyie Wutah and internationally with the 2014 BEFFTA Awards (UK) Winner for spoken word, Lyric Da Nkechi. He was voted Ghana's Best Comedy Icon in a show, "Stars of the Future", organized by Charter House Ghana.

== Early life and career ==
David was born at Koforidua in the Eastern Region of Ghana to Mr Oscar Yaovi Adukpo and Mrs Faustina Mary Asamoah Adukpo. He has 3 siblings; two brothers, Isaac Oscar Ohene Adukpo and Bright Nana Osei Oscar Adukpo and a sister Felicia Mawuena Oscar.

David attended Nursery, Primary and Junior High School education at Freeman Methodist School in Koforidua. He then continued to Pope John Senior High School and Junior Seminary where he studied Visual Arts.

In 2007, David Oscar graduated from the School of Performing Arts at University of Ghana in the Bachelor of Fine Arts Program.

In 2006 while still at the university, David was voted Ghana's Best Comedy Icon when he participated in the comedy reality series "Stars of the Future" that was organized by Charter House Ghana, where he came top out of over 1000 upcoming comedians.

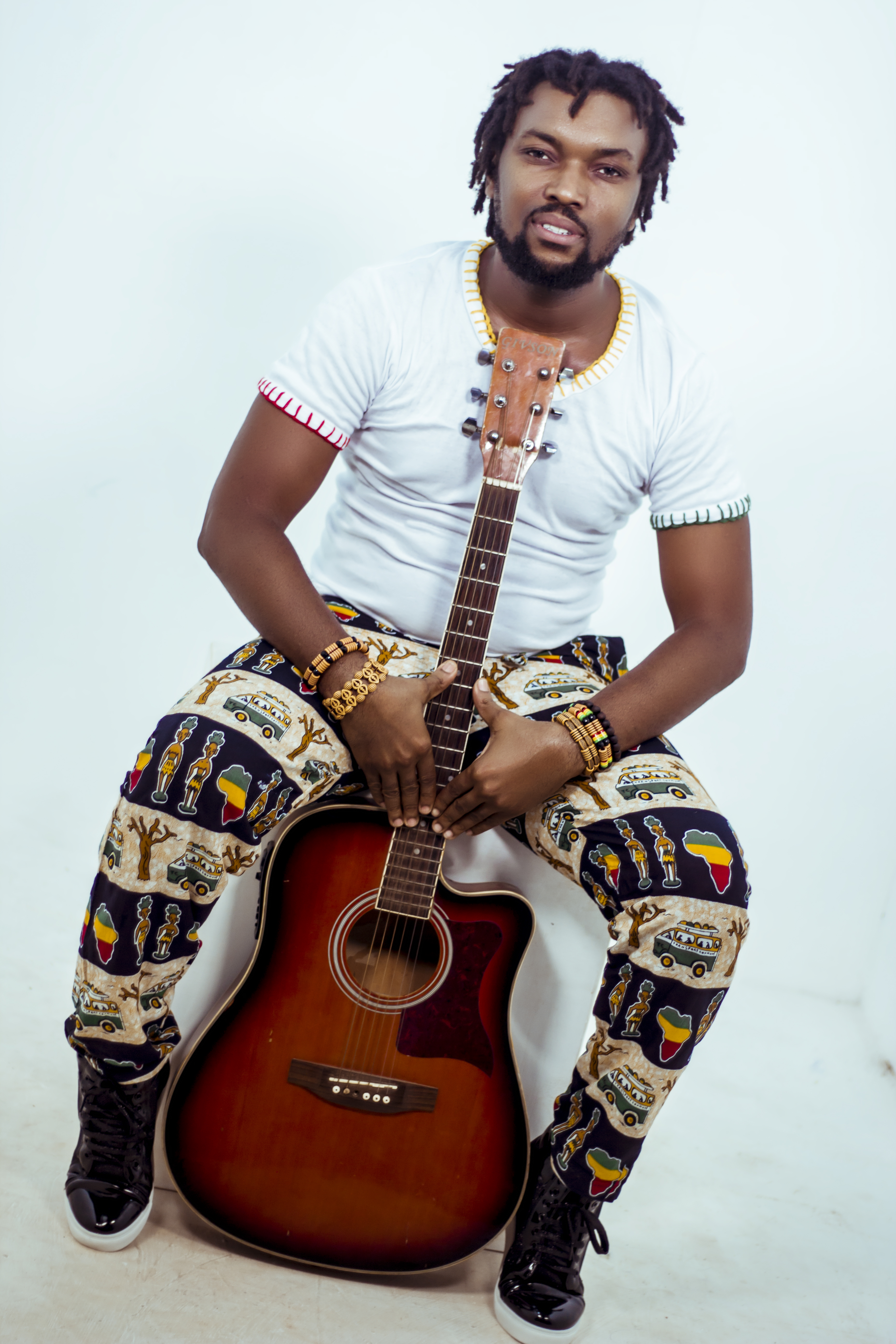
David poses with his acoustic guitar
