= Efiewura =

2001 Ghanaian TV sitcom

- Directed by: Kofi Andoh
- Country of origin: Ghana
- Original language: Akan

Production
- Producer: Kofi Andoh

Original release
- Release: 2001

Efiewura, also spelled Ofiwura, Ofiewura (meaning "Landlord" or “ruler/master of a house” in Twi), is a popular Ghanaian television sitcom that airs on TV3 Ghana, in the Akan language. The series focused on how landlords treat tenants and the relationship that exist between tenant. It started in 2001 and is still in production, making it the longest-running show in the country. It has won several local television awards.

== Cast ==
Cast members of the long-running show have included:

- John Evans Bosompi as Santo
- Margaret Quainoo as Araba Stamp
- Micheal Moncar
- Harriet Naa Akleh Okantey as Auntie B
- Lucky Azasoo-Nkornoo
- Ebenezer Donkor as Katawere
- Abeiku Aggrey Santana
- Kofi Agyiri
- Kwame Dzokoto as Judge Kobooo
- Seth Kwabena Kyere Karikari as Koo Fori
- AJ Poundz
- Florence Boateng
- Joojo Robertson
- Adwoa Smart
- Felix Bell
- Rosamond Brown as Akuapem Polo
- Gloria Sarfo as Nana Ama
