= Nana Ampadu =

Ghanaian highlife musician (1945–2021)

- Also known as: Odwontofoohene; Paa Steele
- Born: Nana Kwame Ampadu; 31 March 1945; Obo Kwahu, Gold Coast
- Origin: Ghana
- Died: 28 September 2021 (aged 76) Accra, Ghana
- Genres: Highlife
- Occupation: Musician
- Instruments: vocal, guitar
- Years active: 1963–2020
- Website: www.nanakwameampadu.com

Nana Kwame Ampadu (31 March 1945 – 28 September 2021) was a Ghanaian musician and composer. Considered as one of the greatest Ghanaian musician of all time, he's credited with numerous popular highlife and he is known to have composed over 800 songs. He was also known as Adwomtofo Nyinaa hempɔn. Ampadu was the lead singer, chief songwriter, and founder of the "African Brothers Band". He is regarded as a pioneer of highlife and afrobeat music and one of the most illustrious Ghanaian musicians of the 20th century.

== Music ==
Ampadu's "African Brothers Band" was formed in 1963. One of the founding members of African Brothers Band was Eddie Donkor.

The name was in support of the call by Kwame Nkrumah for African unity. The group was later renamed the African Brothers International Band in 1973.

Ampadu came to prominence in 1967 when he released his song Ebi Te Yie (or "Some Are Well Seated"), a song that was seen as potentially critical of the then-governing National Liberation Council and disappeared from the airwaves, only returning after the end of military rule. In 1973 he won a nationwide competition in Ghana, Was conferred with the royal title of "Odwontofoohene" ( Sometimes spelled "Nwomtofoohene"or "Nnwontofohene") Meaning: The title literally translate to "king of Musicians" or "Singer-in-Chief".

His musical career also involved him in electoral politics, including composing a song for Jerry Rawlings's National Democratic Congress party to use in the 1992 election campaign. Ampadu also released a song critical of an attempt to disqualify Rawlings from the 1992 election based on him being half-Scottish.

== Influence and achievements ==
Nana Ampadu toured with the S. K. Oppong Drama Group, which performed concerts and short plays on the programmes of his band. This group later evolved to become the cast of Osofo Dadzie, the most popular Ghana TV drama series for many years. One of his songs, Obra, became the theme song for Obra, another very popular Ghanaian TV drama series. He also wrote the theme song for the national Operation Feed Yourself programme of the military National Redemption Council for national food sufficiency.

== Personal life ==
Ampadu was born at Obo Kwahu in the Eastern Region of Ghana on 31 March 1945. His birth name was Patrick Kwame Ampadu and his parents were Opanyin Kwame Ampadu and Mercy Afua Ntiriwaa, both of Obo Kwahu in the Eastern Region of Ghana.

== Awards ==
Nana Ampadu won a number of awards in Ghana.

- Grand Medal of the Volta Civil Division in 1977
- Odwontofoohene by the Arts Council of Ghana in 1973
- the first ever National Dance Band Competition in 1972

== Death ==
Nana Ampadu died on 28 September 2021, at the age of 76, at the Legon Hospital in Accra.

== Additional sources ==
- Arhine, Adwoa, Benjamin Amakye-Boateng, Kofi Agyekum, and Joshua A. Amuah. "Domestic Animal Metaphor in Akan: Representing Human Behaviour in Nana Ampadu's Song 'Obiara Ne Ne Suban'." Ghana Studies 26, no. 1 (2023): 145-170.
