= Margaret Quainoo =

Ghanaian actress (1941-2006)

- Born: 1941; Ghana
- Died: 2006 (aged 64–65); Accra
- Occupations: Actress, entertainer
- Notable work: Efiewura

Margaret Quainoo (1941 – 2006), also known as Araba Stamp, was a Ghanaian actress and entertainer. She was featured in the classic film I Told You So of 1970 and in the Efiewura television series. She played at numerous concert parties and in many movie performances in Ghana. She dropped out of school and joined the Brigade Drama Group at Nungua, a suburb in Accra.

== Selected filmography ==
- Key Soap Concert Party
- I Told You So (1970)<
- Efiewura (2001)
- Sika Sunsum (1991)
- The Lost Stool (1997)
- Shout at the Devil (2001)

== Death ==
She died at the 37 Military Hospital in Accra after a short illness.
