= Akrobeto =

Ghanaian actor and comedian

- Born: Akwasi Boadi; 18 November 1962 (age 63); Ayirebi, Ghana
- Citizenship: Ghanaian
- Occupations: actor; comedian; T.V presenter
- Years active: 1985–present

Akwasi Boadi (born 18 November 1962), known as Akrobeto, is a Ghanaian actor, comedian and TV presenter. He has been featured in over 100 Kumawood movies. Akwesi Boadi is known in the showbiz industry as Akrobeto. Due to his comic acts he has recently been recognized by the international community where his comic acts were used by several presenters on CNN as well as other international television presenters.

== Early life ==
Akrobeto was born on 18 November 1962 at Ayirebi in the Ofoase Ayirebi constituency in the Eastern region of Ghana. He started his basic school education at Akyem Ayerebi L/A primary and middle school and completed in the year 1979. Even though he could not pass his middle school education examination, his love for comedy and acting made him popular and loved in his community. He was the youngest among 11 children born, though 10 are deceased. He could not further his education. He is an ardent football fan.

== Career ==
At age 18, he left his hometown to Accra with Apostle Kwadwo Sarfo of Kristo Asafo Band, when the band visited Akyem Ayerebi to perform their usual concert party in the town. He remained with the Kristo Asafo band and performed in several other productions in the 2000s at the popular keysoap concert party "who is who" competition in those days. In 2008, he started featuring in Kumawood movies. He is currently the host of the television show 'The Real News' on UTV on 2018 and has since remained with them, while still active in the acting industry of Ghana.

He became popular thanks to YouTube, and in November 2020 clips of him reading sports results from European football in an exaggerated and enthusiastic manner became viral. His mispronunciation of Chelsea captain César Azpilicueta's name prompted the Spanish player to share the video on Twitter and reply with a clip in which he explains the correct pronunciation, giving further exposure to Akrobeto. Various satirical shows have played their own clips satirizing the speech of Akrobeto, including the Greek satirical show Radio Arvyla among others, which has shown frequently videos of him and his face appears in the ident of "Top Epikairotitas", a part of the show. Furthermore, the Thursday episode of Radio Arvyla ends with a satirical video where various domestic news are presented with the way of Akrobeto, keeping the graphics of Akrobeto's program.

He was claimed to receive attention from Bayer Leverkusen and other TV platforms in Spain. Patrice Evra called him N'golo Kante's uncle. He was the host of the fourth edition of the 3Music Awards held at the Accra International Conference Centre.

== Personal life ==
Akrobeto is married to Georgina Johnson and has 3 children. He is the brand ambassador to BestPoint Mobile Banking.

== Filmography ==
- The Return of Jamal (2022)
- Heroes of Africa: Tetteh Quarshie (2020)
- Away Bus (2019) as Inspector Yeesu
- Things we do for love
- Chain Of Death
- Akwansidie (2018) as Okyere
- Empress (2017) as Baba
- Na me nnim (2016) as Boakye
- Ama Pooley (2015) as Adu
- Ohia Asoma Wo (2014) as Mr. Badu
- Girls Kasa (2013) as Frenchman
- King Kong (2011) as Agya Ntimoah
- Bediahene (2010) as Nana Kwatah

== Award ==
In March 2021, he emerged as the overall Entertainment Personality of the Year at the Entertainment Achievement Awards.

== See also ==
- List of Ghanaian actors
- Kumawood
