= Pascaline Edwards =

Ghanaian actress (born 1970)

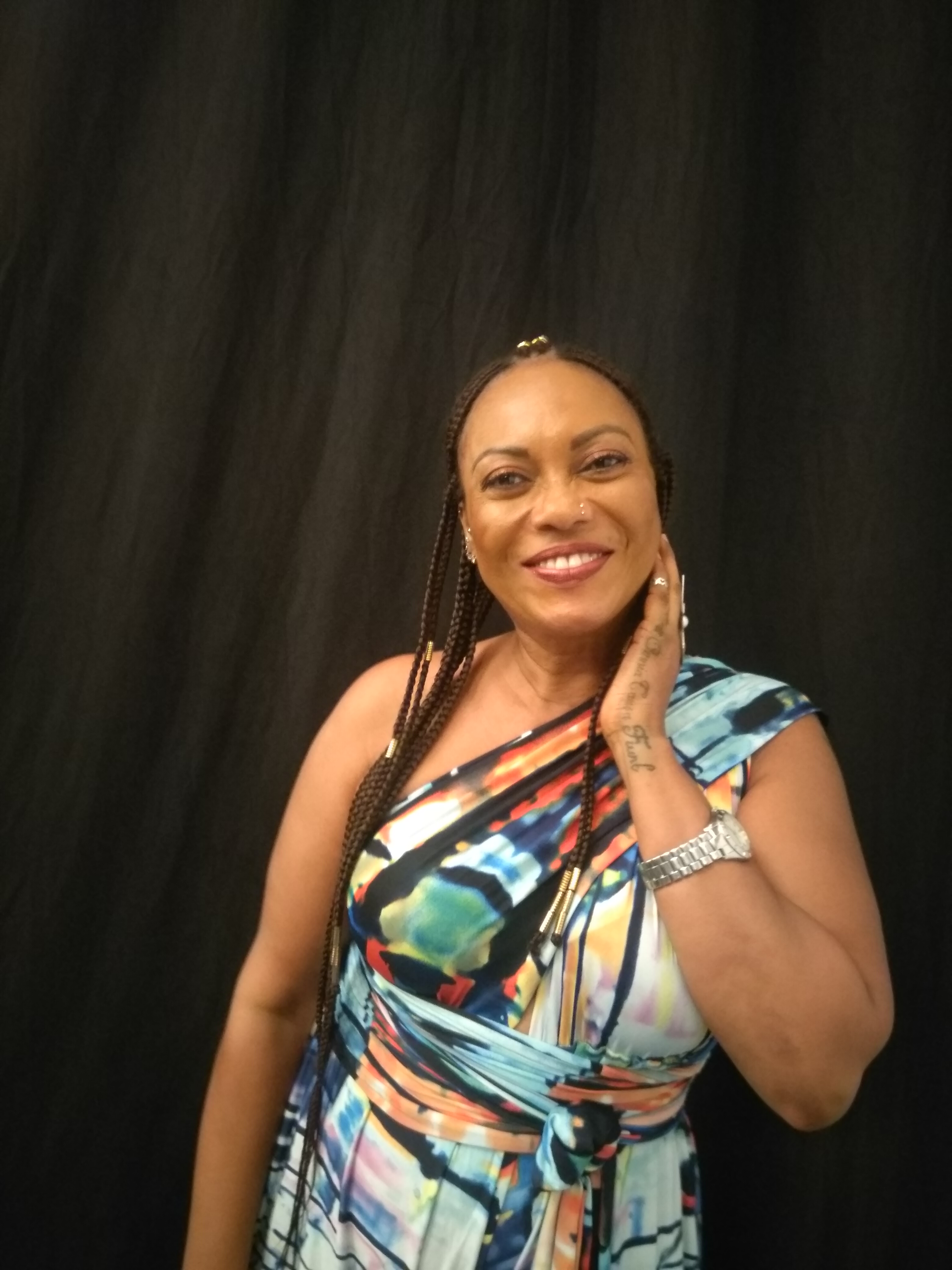
- Born: Lomé, Togo
- Occupation: Actress
- Spouse: Dan Badu

Pascaline Edwards (born 1970) is a Ghanaian actress, winner of Ghana’s Best Female Actress in 2002. Edwards is well-known in the Ghanaian movie scene, with over a hundred movies to her credit in a professional career spanning a little over two decades. She has also acted in a number of Nollywood films. Currently, she combines her career as an actress with managing her film acting training school, Film Techniques, and a fitness gym in Ghana, GeoDan Health and Fitness Centre.

== Early life and education ==
Born in Lomé, Togo in 1970, Pascaline Edwards came to Ghana in 1986 and attended Ghanatta Senior High School. Barely out of her teens, she honed her stage skills in the early 1990s as a member of Ghanaian acting group Talent Drama Group.

== Career ==
She was the lead actress in The Leopard’s Choice (1992). Her first film appearance began with the film Diabolo (1993).

She went back to stage acting and her major break came with a series of classic performances when Emancipation Day celebrations to commemorate the abolition of slavery were introduced in Ghana in 1995.

She played the role of Fathia Nkrumah, wife of Ghana’s first President Dr Kwame Nkrumah in a drama staged during the celebrations and played the role of the wife of former slave trader who was active in abolition of the slave trade in the drama Abolition (1995).

It was her portrayal of a student, who took advantage of a friend’s trust to seduce her friend’s father and destabilise a happy family, in Stab in the Dark (1999) that took her film career to a new level and projected her into stardom.

After a series of Ghanaian productions, her career took another major boost when she began acting major roles in Nollywood (Nigerian) movies with Journey of the Dead (2001).

Edwards set up a film acting institute, Film Techniques in 2007, to share her experience with young actors and actresses, who have the flair and passion to act.

Some of the popular movies she starred in include A Stab in the Dark, Forbidden Fruit (2000), The Mask, House Arrest, My Father’s Wife (1998), Messages, Deadline for Asante, Without Her Consent, and Jewels.

== Personal life ==
Edwards is married to Dan Badu, Commissioner for TV3's Ghana's Strongest IV.

== Partial filmography ==
- A Stab in the Dark (1999)
- Christ in Me (2003) as Thelma
- My Heart (2003) as Helena
- Amsterdam Diary (2005)
- V Republic (2014-2015 TV Series) as Amanda
- Deranged (2017) as Margaret Koleman
- The Case Study (2022)
- The Billionaire's Wife (2023)
- Evor (2024) as Auntie Adjoa
