= Nkomode =

Ghanaian comedian (d. 2016)

Yaw Donkor
- Born: 1958; Ghana
- Died: 2016 (aged 57–58)
- Citizenship: Ghanaian
- Occupation: Comedian
- Children: 6

Yaw Donkor (1958-2016), also known as Nkomode, was a Ghanaian comedian who featured in a TV program known as Concert Party, a soap opera.

== Filmography ==
- Key Soap Concert Party
