= Ebenezer Donkor =

Ghanaian actor

- Born: 1938
- Died: 12 November 2016 (aged 77–78); Cantonments, Accra, Ghana
- Occupation: Actor
- Years active: 1960s-2016
- Known for: Efiewura
- Children: Diana Donkor (daughter)

Ebenezer Donkor, popularly known as Katawere (1938 – 12 November 2016), was a Ghanaian actor known primarily for his role in the Ghanaian television program Efiewura.

== Career ==
Donkor had been in the acting career for over thirty years, starring in several dramatic television series throughout the 1990s. He also starred in over twenty Kumawood films. Donkor died on 14 November 2016 at Opoku Ware Hospital in Cantonments, Accra, having battled an undisclosed illness for the previous two years.

== Selected filmography ==
=== As actor ===
Year	Title	Role	Notes
2008	Apam	Katawere	Drama
2009	Libya Akwantuo	Agya Appiah	Drama
2009	Ananse (Spider-Man) Parts 1 and 2		Direct-to-video film
2001–16	Efiewura		Television series
2010	2016	Mr. Oppong	Direct-to-video film
2011	12:00 Part 1	Mr. James Brown	Direct-to-video film
2011	Masquerades	Mr. Asante	Film
2012	b14? 1	Agya Appiah	Direct-to-video film
2013	C4: The Code of Money and Death	Mr. Vass	Direct-to-video film
2013	13:30 Kaba Church Parts 1 and 2		Direct-to-video film
2015	Chronicles of Odumkrom: The Headmaster	Katawere	Film
