= Abusuapanin Judas =

Ghanaian actor and comedian (born 1945)

Tweneboa Kodua
- Born: 1945 (age 80–81)
- Other name: Abusuapanin Judas
- Occupations: Actor, comedian
- Known for: Key Soap Concert Party

Tweneboah Kodua (born 1945), also known as Abusuapanin Judas or Judas, is a Ghanaian actor and comedian who has featured in many films. He was the friend of the late Bob Santo.

== Career ==
He was the founder of the Ominitimininim Concert Party group with Bob Santo as the leader.

== Filmography ==
- Concert Party
- Double Sense
- 419 I and II
- Banker to Banker
- Marijata
- Asem
- That Day
- Efiewura
- Onyame Tumi So
- Okukuseku
- Sika
- Hard Times
