= Kwadwo Nkansah =

Ghanaian artist, musician, actor and comedian (born 1987)

Kwadwo Nkansah Lil Win
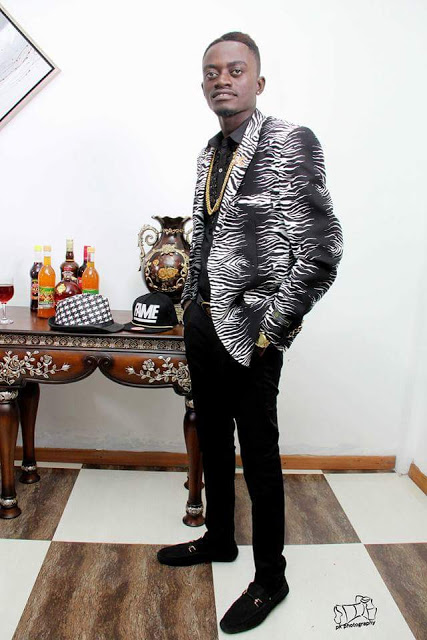

Background information
- Also known as: Lil Win
- Born: Nkansah Kwadwo; 15 April 1987 (age 39)
- Origin: Kumasi, Ghana
- Occupations: comedian; actor; musician; artist

Kwadwo Nkansah (born 15 April 1987), professionally known as Lil Win, is a Ghanaian artist, musician, actor, and comedian. He is the founder and director of Great Minds International School in Kumasi, in the Ashanti Region of Ghana.

== Early life and education ==
Lil Win was born to Madam Adwoa Afrah and Mr. Kwadwo Boadi Nkansah. He grew up with six siblings in Kwaman, in the Ashanti Region of Ghana. He hails from Ahenkro Kwaman in the Ashanti Region. He attended junior high school in Kenyasi Abrem but dropped out of primary school in the sixth grade and did not continue his education. For a long time, he was known to only possess basic education until he went back to school to further his education at Abbeam Institute of Technology in Kasoa.

In an interview on 23 August 2023 with Kwame Nkrumah Tikese on Okay FM, Lil Win revealed that local leaders had encouraged him to consider running for office. They believed his substantial fan base made him a viable candidate for the Afigya Kwabere South parliamentary seat.

== Personal life ==
Nkansah's marriage to his first wife, Patricia, ended around 2018. They had two children together. He later married Maame Serwaa, who is the mother of his twins.

Having been celebrated across the country, Nkansah was involved in a tragic accident that resulted in the death of a three-year-old boy. The incident occurred in Amakom, Kumasi. Nkansah sustained some bruises and was admitted to the Komfo Anokye Teaching Hospital. The accident happened shortly after an interview with Angel FM in Kumasi, where he had discussed his recently premiered movie.

== Filmography ==
- Wrong Turn 3
- Perfect Love (2017)
- Once Upon a Time in Accra
- Maye Papa Enu Me Ho
- Akurase Tumi
- A True Life Story
- The List (2017)
- Condom Producer
- Okwantu Ni Mobrowa
- Onaapo
- Emre Bi
- Sure banker
- Mo Maria (2017) as Yaw Adu
- Se Manhyia (2016) as Efo Ganyor
- Aden Ne Otan Hunu
- Bone Akyi Akatua
- Armageddon
- Ensei Me Din
- Na me nnim (2016) as Agya Beye
- Azonto Ghost (2012) as Adade
- Obra Twa Owuo
- Adanfo Bone (2017) as Kennedy
- The Most Wanted
- Y3 Gye Ya Konya
- Sika Mpe Rough
- Amakye and Dede
- Nteteye Pa (2016) as Akonoba
- A Country Called Ghana (2024)
- Captin Ibrahim Traore ( premiered August 2, 2025)

== Discography ==
=== Singles ===
- "Mama Boss Papa (Yimama)" (featuring Young Chorus)
- "I Don't Think Far (Languages)" (featuring Jupitar, Edem, Tinny, Pope Skinny x Cabum)
- "Okukurodurufuo" (featuring Ohemaa X Dadao x Top Kay)
- "Pidgintoi" (featuring MzVee)
- "I Don't Think Far" (featuring Top Kay X Young Chorus and Spermy)
- "Twedie"
- "I Don't Think Far (Remix)" (featuring Guru, Flowkingstone, Sherry Boss & Zack)
- "Anointing" (featuring Kuami Eugene)
- "How Dare You" (featuring Article Wan)
- "Y3b3 Y3 Yie" (featuring Lasmid)

== Notable associates ==
- Agya Koo
- Aboagye Brenya
- Kwaku Manu
- Mercy Aseidu

== Recognitions and awards ==
- Favorite Actor (2015) Ghana Movie Awards
- United Nations honor for his campaigns against illegal immigration in West Africa.
- Most promising proprietor in 2018.
- A Country Called Ghana was nominated at the 2024 Nollywood Film Festival in Germany.
