= Psalm Adjeteyfio =

Ghanaian actor (1948–2022)

- Born: 1948
- Died: 8 April 2022 (aged 73–74)
- Other name: T.T
- Citizenship: Ghanaian
- Occupation: Actor
- Known for: Taxi Driver, Ultimate Paradise, The Chosen One, Expectations, Asimo, Dark Sand, My Heart

Psalm Adjeteyfio, also known as T.T. (1948 - 8 April 2022), was a Ghanaian actor who featured in movies and videos.

Born in Ghana, then known as Gold Coast, he was best known for the lead character T.T in the Ghanaian TV series Taxi Driver.

Before he got into acting, he was a Ga language teacher at the PRESEC staff school.

== Filmography ==
- The Chosen One (2003)
- Ultimate Paradise
- Taxi Driver
- A Stab In The Dark (1999)
- James Town Fisherman
- Expectations (1998) - Pastor
- Cross My Heart (2007)
- Dark Sand (1999) - Chief Supt. Adin
- Asimo (1999) - Apostle David
- Happy Little Children
- American Boy (2007)

== Death ==
Adjeteyfio died at the age of 74 after a heart attack on April 8, 2022.
