= Bob Santo =

Ghanaian comedian and actor (1940–2002)

- Born: John Evans Kwadwo Bosompem; 1940; Ghana
- Died: 2002 (aged 61–62)
- Other name: Santo
- Citizenship: Ghanaian
- Occupations: Actor, comedian
- Years active: 1962-2002
- Notable work: Efiewura

John Evans Kwadwo Bosompem (/ˈdʒɒn ˈɛvənz ˈkwɑːdwoʊ bɒˈsɒmpɛm/) (1940–2002), also professionally known as Santo or Bob Santo, was a Ghanaian comedian and an actor. He featured in film speaking Akan. He usually acted with his close compatriot, Judas

== Career ==
Santo was famous in the early 2000's with his friend Judas in movie production, acting, and theater. He was the leader of the Omintiminim Concert Party in 1995 when he and his friend Abusapanyin Judas went into film acting and concert party performance.

== Filmography ==
- 419
- Abawa Mary
- Banker to Banker.
- Double Sense
- Asem
- Efiewura
- Key Soap Concert Party
- Landlord
- Marijata (1, 2 and 3)
- Okukuseku (1, 2 and 3)
- Sika
- That Day
- Hard Times
- Lucifer

== Death ==
Santo suffered and died on 30 May 2002 from a disease known as jaundice. He was 62 and was survived by two wives and three children.
