= GTV (Ghana) =

National public broadcaster of Ghana

GTV Ghana
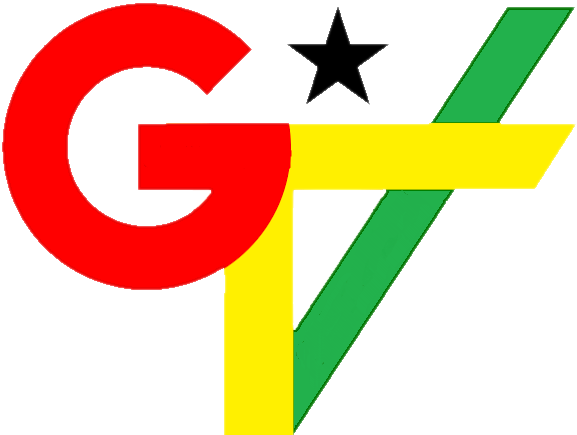
- Country: Ghana
- Broadcast area: Ghana
- Headquarters: Accra, Ghana

Programming
- Languages: English; Twi; Ga; Dagbani; Ewe; Other local languages
- Picture format: 1080i (16:9 HDTV)

Ownership
- Owner: Ghana Broadcasting Corporation
- Sister channels: GBC News; Ghana Learning TV; Obonu TV; Lifestyle TV; GTV Sports+

History
- Launched: 31 July 1965; 61 years ago
- Former names: GBC TV

Links
- Website: gbcghanaonline.com/

GTV (Ghana Television or Ghana TV) is the national public broadcaster of Ghana, run by the Ghana Broadcasting Corporation. It commenced operations on 31 July 1965, and was originally known as GBC TV.

== History ==
The Ghanaian government set up a feasibility study for the introduction of a television service in 1959. This led to a training agreement with Canada in 1961. Training did not start until 1963, under the supervision of two officials from the Canadian Broadcasting Corporation (CBC), Frank D. Goodship and Wes Harvison. In the same year, a television training house was created.

Ghana Television launched on 31 July 1965 at 4:00 p.m., after a few months of test transmissions, exactly thirty years since the launch of Radio ZOY. The station's facilities were built by British company Marconi. At its launch speech, Kwame Nkrumah defended that GTV should be used for "education in the broadest purest sense". The channel broadcast from 6:00 to 10:30 p.m. on weekdays and 4:00 to 10:30 p.m. on weekends. 75% of its programming was local, the highest percentage out of a country in Africa at the time. The remaining 25% was given to foreign programming, including documentaries, feature films and international TV series such as I Love Lucy, The Saint and The Twilight Zone. There was some censorship at the time, as operators were told to fade to black whenever foreign films and series had scenes of kissing, shooting and violence, which were not suitable for children.

At 7:30 p.m. on launch day, the first news bulletin was broadcast. After the overthrowing of Nkrumah's government on 24 February 1966, the separate television body merged with Radio Ghana to form the current Ghana Broadcasting Corporation.

During the first years, GTV has been broadcasting with noncommercial programming in 4 transmitters. The audience was estimated to be at one million, in Accra and some provincial capitals. During the brief period under Nkrumah, he discouraged that GTV would be used as a commercial tool. On February 1, 1967, GTV introduced daily commercial programming.

By the early 1970s, GTV broadcast two daily hours of programmes for schools and a five-hour regular daily service.

GTV broadcasts mainly local programming, with over 80% of the schedule consisting of original productions. Although its main production studio is located in Accra, it has affiliations nationwide and covers 98% of the airwaves in Ghana, making it the country's most powerful mode of advertisement. Although GTV is largely funded by the Ghanaian government, it also collects annual fees from viewers. After first being tested in 1980, the channel converted to color broadcasting in 1985.

GBC celebrated its 90th anniversary on July 31, 2025, with the theme "GBC: The First Chapter, the Making of a National Radio.

In late 2025, minister for Communication and Digitalization Sam Nartey George, announced that Ghana targets the second quarter of 2026 for the final Analogue Switch-Off (ASO)..

== Programmes ==
GTV currently and formerly broadcasts shows from international networks from regions such as Europe, the United States, and Asia. Some of these shows include In The House, The Cosby Show, Taina, Becker, Everybody Loves Raymond, The Oprah Winfrey Show, Family Matters, Moesha, Soul Food, The King of Queens, The Fresh Prince of Bel Air, Passions, and Touched by an Angel.

Foreign feature films, particularly from the United States, as well as music videos by U.S.-based Black artists are shown. Despite its entertainment format, much of GTV's programming is either educational (for example, portraits of Ghanaian artists such as Eric Adjetey Anang) or addresses social issues. The station also broadcasts live international events like the Olympic Games, FIFA World Cup, Miss World and Miss Universe. Local competitors of GTV include TV3 and Metro TV.

== Other GTV channels ==
Since 2015, GTV has moved from a single analogue station to a digital network. As of 2026, it operates five key digital channels:

- GTV Sports+: 24-hour sports. It was the primary broadcaster for the 2026 World Cup qualifiers and the 13th African Games held in Accra.
- GBC News (formerly GBC 24): A 24-hour news and current affairs station.
- Lifestyle TV (formerly GTV Life): Dedicated to religion, culture, and lifestyle.
- Obonu TV: Broadcasts in Ga-Dangbe, focusing on the Greater Accra and coastal regions.
- Ghana Learning TV: Launched in March 2020 to provide distance education during the COVID-19 pandemic.

== Current leadership ==
Professor Amin Alhassan was appointed director and general of GTV on October 1, 2019. In February 2024, the National Media Commission (NMC) renewed his contract for a final term ending in September 2027. Professor Samuel Debrah was appointed chairman of the GBC Governing Board in March 2025 by the NMC.
