= Cinema of Ghana =

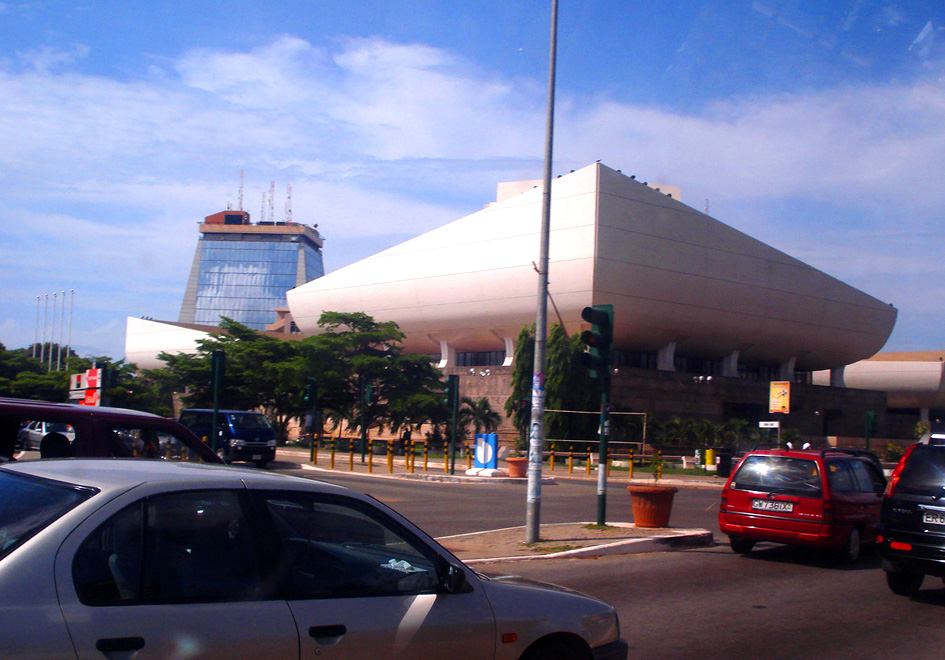
National Theatre of Ghana, Accra

The Ghanaian film industry, nicknamed Ghallywood, began when early film making was first introduced to the British colony of Gold Coast (now Ghana) in 1923. At the time only affluent people could see the films, especially the colonial master of Gold Coast. In the 1950s, the popularity of film making in Ghana began to increase. Cinemas were the primary venue for watching films until home video became more popular. The movie industry has no official name as yet since consultations and engagements with stakeholders has been ongoing when a petition was sent to the Ministry of Tourism, Arts, and Culture which suspended the use of the name Black Star Films.

== Cinema in the colonial period ==
=== 1920s ===
In the early 1920s, individuals in the private sector brought film to Ghana (then Gold Coast) by opening cinemas in urban areas. By 1923, cinema became a new form of entertainment, though only the affluent could see the films exhibited at the cinemas. Cinemas were for the first class society, that is the colonial leaders and their top officials. Later on cinema vans were used in rural areas.

=== 1940s ===
In the 1948, when the colonial masters discovered that film, besides its entertainment values, could be used to brainwash and transform society in the direction of the filmmaker, decided to establish the Gold Coast Film Unit at the Information Services Department of the colonial government. Film became another system, considered to be scientifically appropriate, to influence society. The Gold Coast Film Unit used green-yellow Bedford buses to screen documentary films, newsreels and government information films to the public. Attendance was free. (Sakyi 1996: 9). The films included propaganda films about World War II, which were produced by the Colonial Film Unit (CFU) in London. (cf. Diawara 1992: 3).

== Cinema in independent Ghana ==
After the war, the unit produced educational and feature films for its African colonies. The films were designed to contrast the Western "civilised" way of life with the African "backward" way of life. They suggested "superstitious" customs should be ceased. (Diawara 1992: 3; Ukadike 1994: 44ff).

The Gold Coast Film Unit, also produced films with local interest to encourage improvements in health, crops, living, marketing and human co-operation. (Middleton–Mends 1995: 1; Diawara 1992: 5). In 1948, the Gold Coast Film Unit began to train local African film makers. Films were exchanged with other British colonies in Africa. (Middleton-Mends ibid.).

=== 1960s ===
The first president of Ghana, Dr. Kwame Nkrumah established the Ghana Film Industry Corporation (GFIC) in 1964 at Kanda, in Accra. Nkrumah sent Ghanaians abroad to learn filmmaking purposely for the running of the GFIC. Ghana had professionally trained filmmakers who were employed by the government to produce films for the socioeconomic development of the country. Chris Tsui Hesse, Ernest Abbeyquaye, Kwaw Ansah and many others were all trained by the government, under the leadership of President Nkrumah. GFIC was established to use indigenous Ghanaian made films to reverse the negative impact of the films made by the colonial government and to restore the pride of being a Ghanaian and an African in the citizens. The Ghana Film Industry Corporation was making films to serve the purpose of building self-reliance in the African people. More than 150 feature and documentary films were produced by the GFIC by the late 1960s. After the overthrow of Nkrumah in 1966, the film industry in Ghana fell off to a great degree.

=== 1980s ===
In 1981, the first independent film, Love Brewed in the African Pot, was produced by Kwaw Ansah, one of the legendary filmmakers in Ghana. The film was shot on celluloid film. After that, King Ampaw, a Ghanaian filmmaker trained in Germany also followed suit with the release of his film Kukurantumi - The Road to Accra in 1982. By the middle of the 1980s, the new generation in Ghana, led by William Akuffo, decided to adapt the new video technology that was introduced to the world in 1978, for the production of films. The Video Home System (VHS) cameras were used to shoot feature-length films from 1986 in Ghana. The goal was to tell Ghanaian and African stories through the eyes of Africans. Ghana was the first country in the world to use VHS cameras to shoot feature-length films. By the end of the 1980s, Ghana could boast of a number of films produced in Ghana on VHS tapes cassettes.

Since the late 1980s, the making of direct-to-video films has increased in Ghana. Funds for cinematography were hard to come by for both the state-owned Ghana Film Industry Corporation (GFIC) and for independent film makers. Therefore, people in Ghana began to make their own films using VHS video cameras. The independent filmmakers created their own Ghanaian stories and scripts of the films, assembled actors, both professionals and amateurs and made successful films especially in Accra. Income from these VHS video movies helped to support the film industry. In the 1980s, when the filmmakers started making the video-films, GFIC rose bitterly against it. The authorities of the GFIC did not see the future of video technology becoming part of the global format of filmmaking so they practically rose against it and made it difficult for the independent producers in Ghana at the time. GFIC prohibited their film directors to assist the independent producer in making the video-films. The consequence of this decision of GFIC caused the country to lose professionalism in the art of filmmaking in Ghana. The producers were forced to start directing their own video-films. This culture of produce and direct without any professional training on filmmaking would become the controllable culture in the next three decades.

=== 1990s ===
After some years, GFIC started to offer technical support to the VHS filmmakers in exchange for the right to first screening in its Accra cinemas. Their films had become very popular since the Ghanaians were seeing true narratives of who they were through these films made by indigenous Ghanaian filmmakers. By the early 1990s, approximately fifty VHS video movies per year were made in Ghana. Over time, professional and amateur filmmakers in Ghana produced films of similar quality and garnered equal respect.

In 1996, the government of Ghana sold seventy percent of the equity in the GFIC to the Malaysian television production company, Sistem Televisyen Malaysia Berhad of Kuala Lumpur. The GFIC was renamed "Gama Media System Ltd". GFIC now houses TV3, a television station that was initially Malaysian-owned but was acquired by the Ghanaian company Media General Ghana Limited in 2011.

This also affected the rising film industry in the country very badly. GFIC was in charge of about half the cinema-theatres in the country at the time. The sales of the 70% of GFIC collapsed the cinema industry. The company had little interest in film making and so the film industry in Ghana continued with independent film makers whose funding relied on the popular appeal of the films. For example, in Ghanaian cinema, there is a popular theme of darkness and occultism placed in a framework of Christian dualism involving God and the Devil (see Meyer 1999a).

=== 2000s ===
In about 1997, Ghanaians and Nigerians started making collaboration films that introduced Nigerian film directors such as Ifeanyi Onyeabor (a.k.a. Big Slim), Rev. Tony Meribe-White and later around 2006, the Nigerian filmmaker Frank Rajah Arase who was brought in by Ifeanyi Onyeabor as his personal or production assistant. He also grew to become a movie director and collaborated with Venus Films, a Ghanaian production company, to produce a number of films that brought out Ghanaian popular actors who could access work in Nigeria (Nollywood). Some of the actors included Van Vicker, Jackie Appiah, Majid Michel, Yvonne Nelson, John Dumelo, Nadia Buari, Yvonne Okoro . Some Nigerian producers have filmed in Ghana where production costs are lower.

=== 2010s ===
In 2017, the Ndiva Women's Film Festival, an African film festival for women filmmakers and audiences, was established in Accra.

=== 2020s ===
The rise of streaming brought attention to Ghanaian cinema, especially Kumawood.

== Kumawood and Ghallywood ==
Films made in the Twi and Kumasi dialects are known as Kumawood films. English-speaking Ghanaian films are sometimes known as "Ghallywood" productions. And all the films made in Ghana are referred to as the Ghana Films since there is no official name yet. Films depicting African witchcraft are popular in Ghana, despite criticism being directed towards them. Ghana produces low-budget visual effects films. These include 2016 (2010), and Obonsam Besu (The Devil Will Cry).

== Nigerian cinema ==
Many Ghanaian actors have found success in Nigerian cinema and Nollywood. This has been criticized by Ghanaian film people as a "brain drain" that disadvantages the Ghanaian film industry.

== See also ==
- Ghana National Film Authority
- List of Ghanaian actors
- Category:Cinema of Ghana ( 13 )

=== Festivals ===
- Black Star International Film Festival

== Bibliography ==
- Allen, Robert C. 1995 Introduction. In: R. C. Allen (ed.) To be Continued.... Soap Operas Around the World. London: Routledge. pp. 1–26.
- Brantlinger, Patrick. 1988. Rule of Darkness. British Literature and Imperialism, 1830–1914. Ithaca and London: Cornell University
- Diawara, Manthia. 1992. African Cinema. Politics & Culture. Bloomington & Indianapolis: Indiana University Press.
- Geschiere, Peter. 1997. The Modernity of Witchcraft. Politics and the Occult in Postcolonial Africa. Charlottesville and London: University Press of Virginia
- Gifford, Paul. 1994. "Ghana's Charismatic Churches". Journal of Religion in Africa 64 (3): 241–65
- Gifford, Paul. 1998 African Christianity. Its Public Role. Bloomington and Indianapolis: Indianan University Press
- Gunning, Tom. 1989. "An Aesthetic of Astonishment". Art & Text 34 (Spring):*
- Kramer, Fritz. 1987. Der rote Fes. †ber Besessenheit und Kunst in Afrika. Frankfurt am Main: AthenŠum.
- Landau, Paul. 1994. "The Illumination of Christ in the Kalahari Desert". Representations 45 (Winter): 26–40.
- McLuhan, Marshall. 1995 [1964] Understanding Media. The Extensions of Man. London: Routledge.
- McQuire, Scott. 1998. Visions of Modernity. Representation, Memory, Time and Space in the Age of the Camera. London: Sage.
- Mensah, G. B. 1989. "The Film Industry in Ghana — Development, Potentials and Constraints". University of Ghana, Legon: Unpublished thesis.
- Meyer, Birgit. 1995. "Delivered from the Powers of Darkness. Confessions about Satanic Riches in Christian Ghana". Africa, Vol. 65 (2): 263–55.
- Meyer, Birgit. "Make a complete break with the past. Memory and Post-colonial Modernity in Ghanaian Pentecostalist discourse". Journal of Religion in Africa XXVII (3):316–349.
- Meyer, Birgit. 1999a. Translating the Devil. Religion and Modernity Among the Ewe in Ghana. Edinburgh: Edinburgh University Press.
- Meyer, Birgit.1999b. "Popular Ghanaian Cinema and the African Heritage". Working Paper 7. The Hague: WOTRO-Project "Globalization and the Construction of Communal Identitie".
- Middleton–Mends, Kofi. 1995. "Video-Production — Which Direction?" Unpublished paper.
- Moore, Rachel. n.d. "Savage Theory. Cinema as Modern Magic". Manuscript.
- Morton–Williams. 1953. Cinema in Rural Nigeria. A Field Study of the Impact of Fundamental-Education Films on Rural Audiences in Nigeria. West African Institute of Social and Economic Research, University College, Ibadan.
- Neal, James H. 1966. Ju-ju in My Life. London: George G. Harap.
- Pels, Peter. 1999. A Politics of Presence. Contacts Between Missionaries and Waluguru in Late Colonial Tanganyika. Chur: Harwood Academic Publishers.
- Powdermaker, Hortense. 1950. Hollywood. The Dream Factory. USA: The Universal Library, Little Brown, and Company
- Sakyi, Kwamina. 1996. "The Problems and Achievements of the Ghana Film Industry Corporation and the Growth and Development of the Film Industry in Ghana". University of Ghana, Legon: Unpublished thesis.
- Sreberny–Mohammadi, Annabelle and Ali Mohammadi. 1994. Small Media, Big Revolution. Communication, Culture, and the Iranian Revolution. Minneapolis: University of Minnesota Press.
- Starker, Steven. 1989. Evil Influences. Crusades Against the Mass Media. New Brunswick & London: Transaction Publishers.
- Tyler, Parker. 1971[1947] Magic and Myth of the Movies. London: Secker & Warburg.
- Ukadike, Nwachukwu Frank. 1994. Black African Cinema. Berkeley, Los Angeles, London: University of California Press.
- Van der Geest, Sjaak. n.d. "Ybisa Wo Fie: Building a House in Akan Culture". Unpublished paper.
- Verrips, Jojada. in press. "The State and the Empire of Evil" in J. Mitchell & P. Clough (eds), Powers of Good and Evil. Oxford: Berghahn Books.
- Richard Yaw Boateng, National President of Film Directors Guild of Ghana (FDGG). 2015.
