= List of Ghanaian films of 1980 =

This is a list of Ghanaian films released in 1980.

Title	Director	Cast (Subject of documentary)	Genre	Notes	Release date
Love Brewed in the African Pot	Kwaw Ansah	Reginald Tsiboe, Anima Misa Amoah			
