= Ato Kwamina Yanney Snr. =

Ghanaian filmmaker (1933–2011)

Ato Kwamina Yanney Sr.
- Born: 22 January 1933; Ghana
- Died: 11 April 2011 (aged 78); Tema, Ghana
- Occupation: Ghanaian movie maker
- Notable work: Market Day; Cult of Twins; Population Census; Golden Pod; Rainbow Colors; New Breed; Death on Wheels; The Last Show
- Partner: Paulina Amegayibor
- Children: 7

Ato Kwamina Yanney Sr. (22 January 1933 – 10 April 2011) was an award-winning Ghanaian independent filmmaker and one of the pioneers of Ghana film industry.

== Education ==
Yanney attended the Kilburn Polytechnic (London), then studied screenplay writing and directing at the London School of Film Technique, and the University of London (E.D). He later obtained a degree in film critique and appreciation. He studied at the Feature and Documentary Film Studios in Poland.

== Career ==
Yanney worked as a local recruit in the United Kingdom at the Ghana High Commission. He wrote short stories that were broadcast on BBC Home Service. Example's that can be cited are the Ominous sneeze and It came from Heaven Ato returned to Ghana and joined the Ghana Film Industry in 1963. He later became the head of production of the corporation. He mooted an idea that became the National Film and Television Institute (NAFTI) and as a consultant with the Ghana Broadcasting Corporation.

=== Works ===
In 1984 he shot "His Majesty's Sergeant" on PANAVISION (35MM), the first of its kind in Ghana with the re-mastered and television version (2005) registered under the British Board of Film Classification (BBFC). This work has been screened for research purposes at Harvard University Center for African Studies, Southern Methodist University in Dallas and Boston University. After its disappearance from the British film Laboratory for 25 years, it was launched in the United Kingdom by Big "H" Entertainment and Flamboyant Damsel Films, a production unit he set up, in March 2011.

- No Tears For Ananse (Screenplay)
- Genesis Chapter X (Screenplay)
- Market Day
- Cult of Twins
- Population Census
- Golden Pod
- Rainbow Colors
- New Breed
- Death on Wheels
- The Last Show
- Panoply of Ghana
- Old Simpson Series (writer)

== Achievements ==
During the centenary of world cinema, he was awarded with a Certificate of Distinction in Scriptwriting. He was awarded with a GAFTA Osagyefo citation for promoting pan-Africanism. He was honored for contributing to the development of the Ghanaian Film Industry in film production and directing at the 40th anniversary of the industry. Ato Kwamina Yanney was responsible for the grooming filmmakers like Ivan Quashigah, George Bosompim, Yaw Boakye, Emmanuel Kwesi France, the Nollywood film actor, and introduced his cousin Kwaw Ansah into the industry.

== Personal life and death ==
Yanney married Paulina Yanney (née) Amegayibor, in the early 1970s, and the marriage produced four children; Papa, Ato Yanney Jnr., Bianca, and Kofi. He was previously married in England to Margaret Mead, whom he had three children with; Yvonne Yanney, a British Musician, Sidney, and Velma.

Yanney Sr. died after a short illness at Tema General Hospital, on 10 April 2011, at the age of 78.
