= Bob J =

Ghanaian cinematographer

- Citizenship: Ghana
- Occupation: Cinematographer

Robert Kwame "Bob J" Johnson (? - 12 December 2010) was a famous Ghanaian cinematographer.

== Life and career ==
Johnson worked on a number of highly rated Ghanaian films, often collaborating with the popular director Shirley Frimpong-Manso. He also worked on several television commercials and documentaries. He was well-loved within the acting community and was sometimes called Ghana's best cinematographer.

Popularly known as "Bob J," Johnson was educated at the National Film and Television Institute (NAFTI). In addition to creating films within the Ghanaian movie industry, he worked in the camera department on international productions in the United States and the United Kingdom.

Johnson was the former President of the Cinematographers Guild of Ghana (CGG).

== Death and legacy ==
Johnson was an experienced professional motorbiker. However, while training soldiers to ride motorbikes in Aburi, Johnson died on 12 December 2010.

Speaking after his death, Shirley Frimpong-Manso, who directed five of Johnson's films, noted that "Bob J" had left a lasting influence on the Ghanaian film industry. She also said: “Bob was meticulous, professional, creative, a strong pillar of reliability and above all, a big brother and this can be attested by all those who had the privilege to work with him. He was full of life and Great Spirit on and offset; it will never be the same without him.”

The respect for Johnson within the film industry, both by on-screen performers and behind-the-scenes personnel, was such that some film production companies halted production purposely for Johnson's funeral. Some actors deserted production sets which did not stop filming to attend the funeral.

== Posthumous awards ==
At the maiden edition of the Ghana Movie Awards, Johnson was posthumously awarded the Best Cinematography Award for his 2009 film A Sting in a Tale. His film Check Mate also received a posthumous nomination for Best Cinematography at the Ghana Movie Awards. Additionally, his film The Good Old Days: The Love of AA received a posthumous nomination for Best Cinematography at the Africa Movie Academy Awards (AMAA).

In 2012, the Ghana Academy of Film and Television Arts (GAFTA) instituted the Robert Johnson Silhouette Award for Best Cinematography at the National Film and Television Institute Students Film Festival. The award has been given out twice, in 2012 and 2014.

== Filmography ==
- Scorned (2008) (directed by Shirley Frimpong-Manso)
- Perfect Picture (2009) (directed by Shirley Frimpong-Manso)
- A Sting in a Tale (2009) (directed by Shirley Frimpong-Manso)
- Double (2009) (directed by Kwaku Sintim-Misa)
- Check Mate (2010) (directed by Shirley Frimpong-Manso)
- 6 Hours to Christmas (2010) (directed by Shirley Frimpong-Manso)
- The Good Old Days: The Love AA (2010) (directed by Kwaw Ansah)
- 4Play Reloaded (2011) (produced by Abdul Sallam)
- Masquerades (2011) (directed by Xavier Arjis of Belgium; written by Lydia Forson)
