= Chris Tsui Hesse =

Ghanaian cinematographer, filmmaker and Presbyterian minister

The Rev. Dr. Christian Hesse
- Hesse at the showing of The Eyes of Ghana in Accra
- Born: Christian Tsui Hesse; 29 August 1932 (age 94); Osu, Accra, Gold Coast
- Education: Odorgono Secondary School; National Film School in Łódź; University of Sorbonne; University of Southern California (BDiv, PhD)
- Occupations: cinematographer; filmmaker; photographer; Presbyterian minister
- Years active: 1954–1994
- Spouse: Regina Hesse (m. 1959)

Ecclesiastical career
- Church: Presbyterian Church of Ghana

Christian Tsui Hesse, popularly known as Chris Hesse (born 29 August 1932) is a Ghanaian cinematographer, filmmaker, film administrator, photographer and Presbyterian minister who is known for his cinematography in several award-winning films such as the critically acclaimed Love Brewed in the African Pot (1980) and Heritage Africa (1989). He was the personal cinematographer of Ghana's first President, Dr Kwame Nkrumah. Hesse helped to document the visual history of the political leadership and development of the country. He also worked for the United Nations, serving as a photographer, documenting the Congo Crisis in 1960.

== Early life and education ==
Christian Tsui Hesse was born on 29 August 1932 at Osu, Accra. He attended the all-boys' Presbyterian boarding middle school, the Salem School and Odorgonno Secondary School, obtaining the Cambridge Overseas Certificate in 1954. In the same year, he was employed at the Ghana Film Industry Corporation (GFIC). He attended the National Film School in Łódź, Poland, graduating in 1960. He also obtained a post-graduate certificate in Film and TV Arts from the University of Sorbonne in Paris. Hesse's other academic credentials include a Bachelor of Divinity (1985) and a PhD (1989) in Film and Arts, both earned from the University of Southern California, California.

== Career ==
Hesse's working career spans four decades (1954–1994) spent in the service of the Gold Coast Film Unit, later called the Ghana Film Industry Corporation. He worked on the British Academy Film Award, which later was nominated for Best Film from any Source, The Boy Kumasenu (1952) directed by British director Sean Graham. Hesse rose through the ranks to become managing director of the Ghana Film Industry Corporation (GFIC) for ten years, until his retirement from government service in 1994.

Hesse has a wealth of experience in film production, including being the head of News Department of the GFIC for ten years (1974–1984), within which period he produced several newsreels, magazines, adverts and short documentaries, some of which have won international awards. He won the Golden Camera Award (First Prize in Cinematography in Africa) at the Panafrican Film and Television Festival of Ouagadougou (FESPACO), Burkina Faso, in 1985. He was the director of photography for Kwaw Ansah's award-winning films Love Brewed in the African Pot (1980) and Heritage Africa (1989). Hesse was also the director of photography for the filmmaker Ato Yanney Snr.'s His Majesty's Sergeant (1984). Hesse also travelled extensively throughout the world filming conferences at the UN, Commonwealth, Organisation of African Unity (OAU), Non-Aligned Movement, visits of Heads of State and various international seminars.

Chris Hesse is known to be the first war cameraman to shoot a film on the Congo Crisis in 1960 for worldwide distribution in the capacity as an Honorary Captain in the Peace Keeping Force in 1960. From pre-colonial to post-independent Ghana (1956–1966), he was the official cinematographer to Kwame Nkrumah (1956–1966) and also to subsequent Heads of State, namely: J. A. Ankrah, A. A. Afrifa, K. A. Busia, I. K. Acheampong, Fred Akuffo, Hilla Liman and J. J. Rawlings.

Hesse was ordained into the Christian ministry of the Presbyterian Church of Ghana in 1985 and served in several congregations. He also became the executive director of the Prisons Ministry of Ghana. Hesse has been married to Regina Hesse (a retired Officer of the Bank of Ghana) since 1959 and they have five adult children and grandchildren. His hobbies include lawn tennis, jogging, cycling and yoga. He is fluent in English, French, Ga and Twi.

In 2014, Chris Hesse was honoured for his immense contributions to cinema and the nation at the 3rd NAFTI Film Lectures on the Motion Picture Industry, which focused on his work as a cinematographer, film director and documentary photographer. Hesse is one of the individuals who have consistently called for the passage of the film bill that is intended to put in place all the necessary structures and systems for the film industry. Hesse is a founding member and former President of the Ghana Academy of Film and Television Arts (GAFTA). In 2017, he was honoured at the National Film and Television Institute Awards night in Accra.

In 2025, Hesse was the subject of The Eyes of Ghana, a documentary film by Ben Proudfoot, which premiered at the 2025 Toronto International Film Festival.

== Filmography ==
- The Boy Kumasenu (1952)
- Progress in Kodjokrom (1953)
- Mr Mensah Builds a House (1956)
- Beyond the Volta (1956)
- Plebiscite of Togoland (1957)
- Freedom for Ghana (1957)
- Operation Congo (1960)
- Love Brewed in the African Pot (1980)
- His Majesty's Sergeant (1984)
- Heritage Africa (1989)
- Harvest at 17 (1994)
- Cross Road of People, Cross of Trade (1994)
