= Black Star International Film Festival =

Film festival

- Location: Kumasi, Accra
- Established: 2015
- Founded by: Juliet Asante
- Website: bsiff.org

Black Star International Film Festival (BSIFF) is a non-profit festival in Ghana founded by Juliet Asante in 2015. It is a festival celebrated annually to bridge the gap between African movie cinema and the global community of movie makers and focuses on the business aspect of film making.

== Background ==
The Black Star International Film Festival (BSIFF) was founded by Juliet Asante in 2015, and held its first edition in Kumasi, Ghana in 2016.

In 2020, the festival occurred virtually. Earlier in the year, BSIFF partnered with other film organizations to promote an additional advocacy theme, "Jobs for Films."

In 2026, the Black Star International Film Festival hosted films from over 20 countries.

In 2025, BSIFF entered a partnership with Majestic Cinemas to distribute Ghanaian films throughout West Africa, adding dubbing in English and French with CINEKITA and the Nile Group.

UNESCO has supported distribution.

=== Education ===
The festival supports a year-round program of educational workshops and presentations for aspiring and emerging filmmakers. The program is called BSIFF-Edu.

== Events ==
The festival is celebrated for a week and it coupled with several activities which are Workshop, Panel Session, African Film Market, A music concert, Awards night and daily film screenings. During these activities participant or industry players network do business and also celebrate Africans for their works over the year.

== Editions and awards ==
=== 1st edition ===
The first Black Star International Film Festival occurred from 25–28 August 2016. It was held at the Silverbird Cinemas in Kumasi, Ghana. One of the first funders of the festival was the Goethe Institut. Among the organizers were Juliet Asante, Jacqueline Nsiah, Richard Prempeh, Akunu Dake, and others who began the annual tradition.

The theme of the festival was "Shaping the Mind of a Generation." The festival featured panels on the topics of new media, YouTube and web production, and the film opportunities provided by mobile devices and social media, film financing for filmmakers in Africa and the diaspora, independent filmmaking, and reflections on Kumawood and Nollywood at an international scale.

Pat Mitchell attended as a special guest.

Notable films shown at the festival included the opening film Nakom (2016).

=== 2nd edition ===
The first edition occurred from 18–20 August 2017. It was held at Silverbird Cinema, Accra Mall, African Regent Hotel, Achimota Mall and James Town, Mantse Agbona. This edition introduced 6 award categories in collaboration with the Yaa Asantewa-UNDP award.

The theme of the festival was "For The Young At Heart."

Notable guests included Rebecca Akuffo-Addo, the then-First Lady of Ghana, and Catherine Abelema Afeku, the Minister of Tourism.

Notable films included Dar Noir (2017), Moonlight (2016), Apricot Groves (2016), VISUALLY IMPAIRED PERSONALITY (VIP) (2016), Girls Don't Fly (2016) and A United Kingdom (2016).

2017 Awards
| Award | Winner | Film | Country |
|---|---|---|---|
| Best Male Lead | Pedram Ansari | Apricot Groves | Armenia |
| Best Female Lead | Angela Neiman | Xolo | Italy |
| Lifetime Achievement Award | Ernest Abbeyquaye | | |
| Best Male Director(s) | Christophe Rolin Pape Bouname Lopy Marc Recchia | Dem Dem! | Belgium/Senegal |
| Best Feature Film | Daryne Joshua | Noem My Skollie (Call Me Thief) | South Africa |

=== 3rd edition ===
The first edition occurred in 11–18 August 2018 in Accra. The festival featured events at the Silverbird Cinemas, a music concert at the Sandbox Beach Club, and panels at the African Regent Hotel. In early 2018, Asante became the Board Chair of NAFTI.

The theme of the festival was "Film As A Tool For National Development." with an additional theme of "Film as a tool for changing the narrative for women."

On 22 January 2018, BSIFF held a film symposium with the theme, "Film as a tool for changing the narrative for women." The poet Apiorkor Seyiram Ashong-Abbey was one of the attendees.

Rebecca Akuffo-Addo was announced as a BSIFF patron, and attended as a special guest along with Dr. Chris Tsui Hesse.

Notable films included BLACKkKLANSMAN (2018) and The Shoots: Life Is Fare (2018).

2018 Award winners
| Award | Film | Country |
|---|---|---|
| Best Women in Film | Back to Natural: A Documentary Film | |
| Best Documentary | Dna: Using Genealogy to Change My (Slave) Last Name The Rescue List | |
| Best Animation | A Kalaband Ate My Homework | Uganda |
| Best African Rising | Watu Wote | Germany |
| Best Short | Little Fiel | |
| Best Feature | Cleft Lip | |
| Film As A Tool For National Development | Ghana For You, and others | Non-competitive award |
| Lifetime Achievement Award | Grace Nortey | |

=== 4th edition ===
The first edition occurred in 2019.

The theme of the festival was "Connecting Cultures Through Film."

Notable films included GAME CHANGERS (2018).

2019 Award winners
| Award | Film | Director | Country |
|---|---|---|---|
| Africa Rising | Divine 419 | | |
| Best Documentary | The Money Stone | | USA |

=== 5th edition ===
The first edition occurred in 2020. It occurred virtually.

2016 Award winners
| Award | Film | Director |

=== 6th edition ===
v

2017 Award winners
| Award | Film | Director |

=== 7th edition ===
2018 Award winners
| Award | Film | Director |

=== 8th edition ===
2019 Award winners
| Award | Film | Director |

=== 9th edition ===
2016 Award winners
| Award | Film | Director |

=== 10th edition ===
2017 Award winners
| Award | Film | Director |

=== 11th edition ===
2018 Award winners
| Award | Film | Director |

=== THEMES ===
| No. | Dates | Location | Theme | Ref. |
|---|---|---|---|---|
| | 2015 | | | |
| 1st | 2016 | | Shaping The Mind of a Generation | |
| 2nd | 2017 | | For The Young At Heart | |
| | 2018 | | Film As a Tool for National Development | |
| | 2019 | | Connecting Cultures Through Film | |
| | 2020 | Virtual | Stronger Together | |
| | 20-25 September 2021 | | Inspiring the Business of Film in Africa | |
| | 2022 | | | |
| 8th | 18-24 September 2023 | Accra | Tech in Film: Exploring the Role of Technology in Filmmaking in Africa | |
| 9th | 2024 | | | |
| 10th | 2025 | Untamed Empire | | |
| 11th | 24-27 September 2026 | Kumasi | Film and Global Culture: The New Wave of African Cinema | |

== Notable film people ==
- Juliet Asante founded BSIFF and other influential film industry organizations
- Aba Arthur became the BSIFF's Diaspora Ambassador in 2025 with the goal of connecting with Ghanaian and African filmmakers internationally.
- Kofi Asamoah became the BSIFF's Ghana Ambassador in 2026.
- Philippa Ama Bentuma Arthur, Director of BSIFF
- Castro Sarpong Owusu Ansah, Director of BSIFF in 2026

== See also ==
- Cinema of Ghana
- List of film festivals
- List of festivals in Ghana
