= Ghana Academy of Film and Television Arts =

Ghanaian organization

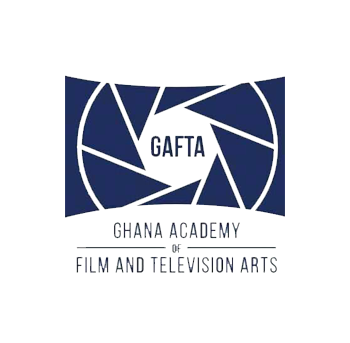
- Abbreviation: GAFTA
- Formation: 2001
- Type: Film, television and new media organization
- Headquarters: Accra, Ghana
- Location: NAFTI Studio IV, 5th Link Road Cantonments, P. O. Box CT 3168 Cantonments, Accra
- Members: 250 approx.
- President: Jim Fara Awindor
- Website: http://www.gafta.org/

The Ghana Academy of Film and Television Arts (GAFTA) is a private, professional organization dedicated to the advancement of excellence in the art, craft and science of the motion picture industry — film, television and new media. The Academy is made up of the following guilds and associations: Directors Guild of Ghana (DGG), Cinematographers Guild of Ghana (CGG), Art Directors' and Designers' Guild of Ghana (ADGG), Animator's Association of Ghana (AAG), Screen Writers Guild of Ghana (SWGG), Film and Television Production Facilitators Guild of Ghana (FTPFGG), Producers Guild of Ghana (PGG), Motion Picture Sound Guild of Ghana (MPSGG) and Screen Editors Guild of Ghana (SEGG).

== Origins ==
A group of filmmakers came together to form a film organization that would maintain a high standard of professional practice; preserve and protect intellectual interests of all filmmakers in Ghana; ensure order and discipline in film making and assist in setting up appropriate and necessary structures in the art and science of film, television, video production and new media. In 2001, The Ghana Academy of Film and Television Arts (GAFTA) was legally formed by some important film industry stakeholders who are considered the founding fathers of the Academy. They are Egbert Adjesu, Chris Tsui Hesse, Kwaw Ansah, Bill Marshall, King Ampaw, Ernest Abbeyquaye, Martin Loh, Setheli Ashong-Katai, Jim Fara Awindor, Ivan Annan, Ebenezer Aryee and Nana Adwoa Awindor.

== Structure ==
=== The Governing Board ===
It is the highest decision-making body of the Academy. It also acts as the advisory and policy making body that is in charge of maintaining high ethical standards in the film making profession in the Academy. It comprises the presidents and vice presidents of the various guilds and associations under GAFTA.

=== The Executive Council ===
It is responsible for the day-to-day administration of the Academy; such as implementing the objectives of the Academy, securing the well being of the membership, establishing committees to assist in the implementation of the programs and maintenance of an annual publication of a register of all members in good standing of the Academy. The Executive Council reports to the Governing Board on matters concerning the Academy. The Executive Council consists of the following members and their deputies who are elected by the Electoral College of the Academy; The President, Vice President, General Secretary, Treasurer, Public Relations Officer, Organizing Secretary and International Relations Officer.

=== The Guilds and Associations ===
These are the respective guilds and associations that make up the membership of GAFTA.

=== Standing Committees ===
These are committees set up by the Executive Council to assist in the implementation of programs to which non-council members may be co-opted on the following matters:

- Finance
- Assessment and Enrollment (Accreditation)
- Discipline and Ethics
- Projects and Programs

=== Electoral College ===
This is the body responsible for electing the various executive positions and any other elections stipulated in the constitution of GAFTA.

== Membership ==
Membership of GAFTA is not open to individual professionals in the motion picture industry but obtained by belonging to any professional guild or association under GAFTA. Membership of the Academy shall also be in the following categories; Council of Elders, Fellows, Corporate members, Honorary members, Associates, Affiliates and Students.

=== Council of Elders ===
This consists of the founding members of GAFTA and persons who, in the opinion of the Governing Board, have contributed immensely, financially or otherwise, to the development of the Academy.

=== Fellows ===
Fellowship of the Academy may be conferred by two-thirds (2/3) majority of the Governing Board on individuals or corporate members who in its opinion have distinguished themselves in any of the creative branches of the motion picture industry for a period of not less than ten years.

=== Corporate Members ===
It is open to all Ghanaians and others who are, or have been practicing the arts and craft of film and TV and who have made valuable contributions to film, TV and video production for not less than five years. This is also conferred by the Governing Board.

=== Honorary Members ===
Honorary membership to the designation of fellow or corporate member may be conferred by the Governing Board of the Academy on non-professional Ghanaians or foreigners as well as institutions, which in the opinion of the Governing Board have contributed significantly to film, television and new media.

=== Associate Members ===
This membership is open to all those who have been in the motion picture industry for less than five years.

=== Affiliate Members ===
Corporate bodies, institutions and associations of practitioners involved in motion pictures may have their members as affiliate members by virtue of being affiliated to GAFTA.

=== Students ===
The guilds and Associations shall determine student membership. Students who are members of a guild or an association shall by extension be affiliate members of GAFTA.

== Activities ==
GAFTA has been involved in several initiatives to assist in the improvement of the film industry by organizing workshops and programs for its members and other filmmakers to upgrade the status of their professions. The Academy has also been part of other forums held by other institutions such as the Ghana Cultural Forum and NAFTI. GAFTA is one of the organizations that have been at the forefront of the enactment of the Development and Classification of Film Act, 2016 (Act 935) which GAFTA believes has the ability to create necessary structures for the film industry to function properly and effectively.

GAFTA held a press conference in 2005 to appeal to Government to take over the running of the GAMA Film Company, because the TV3 Company Limited, owned by Malaysians had failed to deliver on the contract terms of the divestiture program of the Ghana Film Industry Corporation (GFIC) which damaged the county's film industry. Apparently, the Malaysians were not interested in cinema but television. After the GFIC was sold to them, they turned the largest soundstage in West Africa into a TV station; they got rid of film equipment, film strips, including all Ghana's film archives to create space to store their equipment's which were dumped outside to the mercy of the weather. This outraged a lot of independent filmmakers who pressed government to do something about the situation. GAFTA also called on the government to investigate into alleged breach of contract and violation of laid down procedures for the divestiture without Cabinet approval and Presidential accent as required by law. But all this fell on deaf ears.

In 2011 during the Awards night of the National Film and Television Institute (NAFTI) Film Lectures on the Ghanaian Motion Picture Industry in honor of legendary filmmaker, Kwaw Ansah the Academy honored him with the GAFTA Osagyefo Lifetime Achievement Award for his pioneering of the creation of an independent Ghanaian cinema. The GAFTA Robert Johnson Silhouette Award for Exceptional Skills in Cinematography was instituted in 2012 to honor final year cinematography students of NAFTI who have creatively and aesthetically used cinematography in their films. The award was presented to its first recipient, Stanley Adjetey for the film Skin Canvas (2010) directed by Anita Afonu during the 20th NAFTI Students' Film Festival in 2012.

The award was named after the late Award-winning, Ace cinematographer and former President of the Cinematographers Guild of Ghana (CGG), Robert Bob J Johnson who died in a motorcycle accident in 2010. The second recipient of the award was Richard Dodzi in 2014 at the 21st NAFTI Students' Film Festival for the film Tenso (2013), directed by Fiona Ansa. In 2015, the third recipient was Ebenezer Aryetey. GAFTA also sponsored two other awards at the same festival, the award for Best Picture for both 2012 & 2013 year batches for the animation Dzolali (2012) directed by Jude Akwetey and the film Kwaku's Web (2013) directed by Antoni-Jordi Owusu. Despite the Academy's challenges, it is still doing its best to protect the interests of all its members and filmmakers and continuing to do whatever it can to contribute to the development of the industry.

== Current members of the Executive Council of GAFTA ==
The current members of the Executive Council.

- President - Jim Fara Awindor
- Vice President - Yaw Boakye
- General Secretary - Koffi Zokko Nartey
- Organizing Secretary - Aseye Tamakloe
- Secretary - Teddy Sabutey
- Deputy Secretary - Emmanuel Quist-Haynes
- Public Relations Officer - George Bosompim
- Communications Officer - Emmanuel Apea
