= Chris Hesse =

Chris Hesse may refer to:

- Chris Hesse (musician), drummer with Hoobastank
- Chris Tsui Hesse (born 1932), Ghanaian cinematographer and filmmaker
