= Juliet Asante =

Ghanaian actress and film producer

Juliet Yaa Asantewa Asante
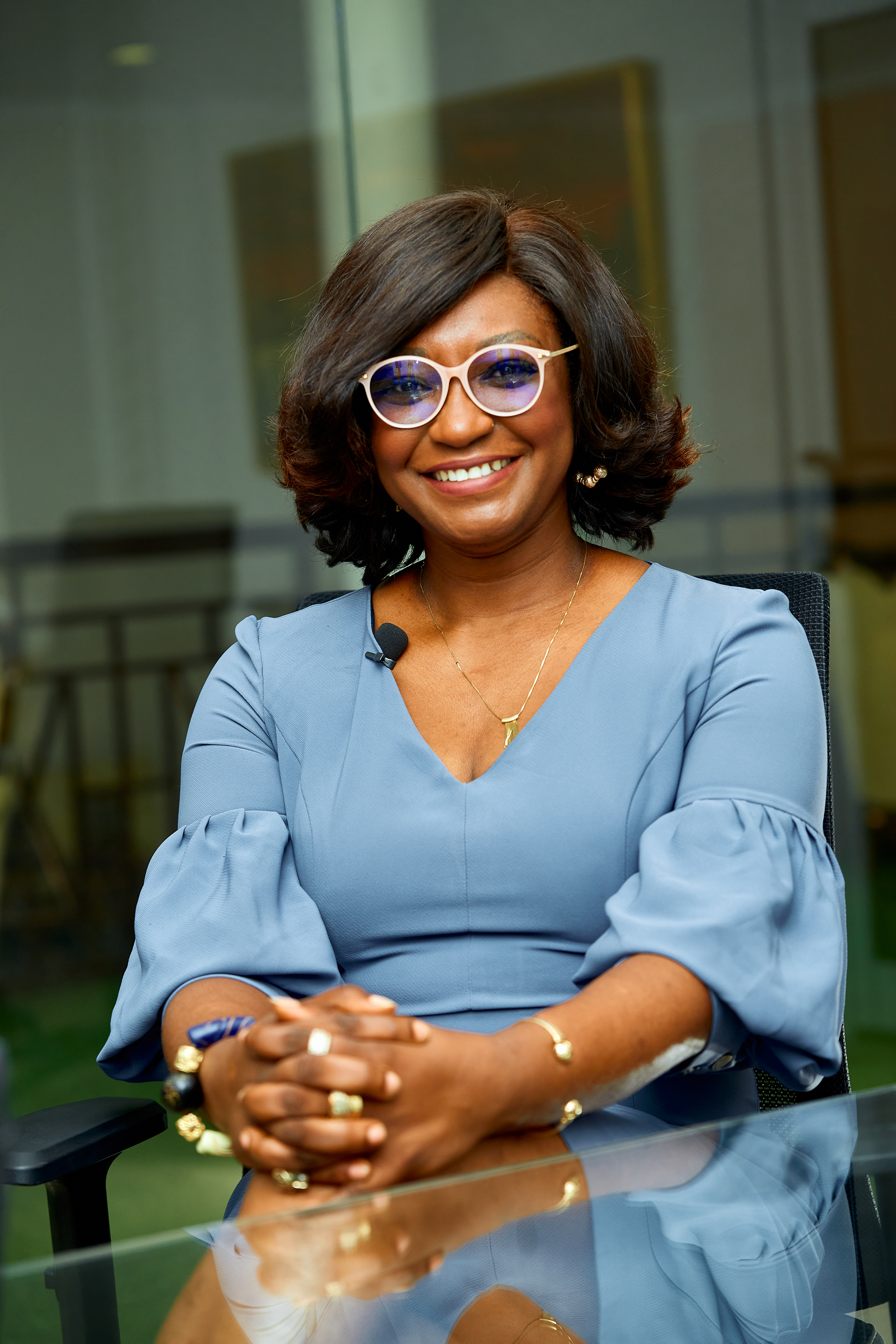
- Born: Ghana
- Education: Harvard Kennedy School of Government; University of Cape Coast; National Film and Television Institute
- Occupations: Film actress, producer and director, and philanthropist
- Notable work: Deadly Voyage
- Awards: Best Actress Award of Ghana (2009)

Juliet Yaa Asantewa Asante is a Ghanaian film actress, producer and director, and philanthropist. She is a former Chief Executive Officer (CEO) of the National Film Authority (NFA). Her latest film, Silver Rain, was nominated for "Best Film in West Africa" and "Best costume" for 2015 in the Africa Magic viewer's choice awards (AMVCA) and also 2015 "Best Overall Film In Africa". In 1999, Asante started the production house Eagle House Productions. That same year she also started "Save Our Women International", a non-profit entity focusing on female sexual education and launched an innovation that makes short movies for the mobile phone in Africa in 2014 called Mobile Flicks. She is also the Founder and executive director of Black Star International Film Festival. Eagle Productions has helped train some actors and actresses in Ghana through its training arm, the Eagle Drama Workshop.

== Early life ==
Asante was born in Ghana and is the second of five children. She holds a master's degree in Public Administration (MPA) and a Master's in Public Policy (MPP) from Harvard Kennedy School of Government. She also holds two bachelor's degrees. She graduated from University of Cape Coast, and also graduated from National Film and Television Institute.

== Career ==
Asante is the former CEO of the National film Authority of Ghana, the board chair of the National Film and Television Institute (NAFTI) and the Founding President of the Black Star International Film Institute, organizers of the Black Star International Film Festival (BSIFF).

She chairs the Curriculum committee of the Creative Arts School, a revolutionary educational concept by the Ministry of Education, Ghana. She is the founder of the Yaa Asantewa Library project, building and stocking libraries in Ghanaian communities. She is a management consultant, change agent and strategic thinker with experience that spans two continents for over two decades. Asante has started, helped to build, built and managed organizations and products globally.

Asante was awarded ‘Best Actress’ in Ghana in 2001. She later went to the National Film and Television institute of Ghana, where she got her first class honors in Film Directing.

Some of the films in which she has acted are Twin Lovers, Fresh Blood, Tears of Blood, Ripples, and Thread of Ananse. She appeared in the 1996 film Deadly Voyage as Albert Mensah's wife. She has written, directed and produced shows on Ghana television, such as Obaby, a dating show, and Secrets, a drama series for which she is also executive producer.

Her latest film, Silver Rain, was nominated for "Best Film in West Africa" and "Best costume" for 2015 in the Africa Magic viewer's choice awards (AMVCA) and also 2015 "Best Overall Film In Africa". Silver Rain went on to garner over 13 nominations worldwide.

As an Entrepreneur and Filmmaker, Asante founded Eagle Productions Limited in 1999, creatively leading the company to produce some of the most successful shows on Ghana Television between 2001 and 2010.

Asante was one of first people to pioneer the idea of short films made especially for your mobile phones. Her company, Mobilefliks successfully worked with MTN to make short films available to audiences through the mobile phone.

She is a regular writer and blogger for The Huffington Post and has served as a Mentor on Entrepreneurship at the Massachusetts Institute of Technology (MIT), Sloan school of business from 2013 to date, also lecturing Mass Communication at the Webster University, Ghana campus in 2017.

== Filmography ==
- Deadly Voyage as Albert's Wife
- Twin Lovers
- Fresh Blood
- Tears of Blood
- Ripples
- Thread of Ananse
- Silver Rain (2015) as Director
- Escape to Love (1996) as Sandra
- Screen Two (1996) as Albert's wife
- Tinsel

== Honours ==
- The Hollywood Reporter′s "Next Generation International TV" (2009)
- The ‘"World of A Difference 100 Most Impactful Women" by the Alliance for Women (TIAW) (2009)
- Ghana's Assoc. of Women Entrepreneur leaders (2009)
- Best Actress Award of Ghana (2009)
