= Evans Hunter =

Ghanaian actor and producer (died 2013)

- Born: Evans Nii Oma Hunter
- Died: 4 June 2013
- Citizenship: Ghanaian
- Occupations: Actor; producer; Director; Writer
- Known for: King Ampaw, Testament, No time to die, A mother's Tears

Evans Nii Oma Hunter (died on 4 June 2013) was a Ghanaian veteran actor, producer, director and writer who contributed to the growth of the local movie and theater industry.

== Career ==
He was the president of the Ghana Actors Guild (GAG) from 1989 to 1996 and was the founder of artistic director of the Audience Awareness Artistic Organisation.

In 1983, he was cast as the character Addey in the King Ampaw directed comedy-drama Kukurantumi. In 1988, he had a starring role as Rashid in the John Akomfrah directed drama Testament. Other prominent roles include that of Francis Essien in the 1989 Kwaw Ansah directed drama Heritage Africa, and as Kokuroko in the 2006 King Ampaw directed comedy No Time to Die, as well as a role in Kwaw Ansah's play titled A Mother's Tears.

== Filmography ==
- Kukurantumi (1983) as Addey
- Nana Akoto (1985)
- Ama
- The Fortune Island
- Testament (1988) as Rashid
- Heritage Africa (1989) as Francis Essien
- No Time To Die (2006) as Kokuroko
