= National Film Authority Presidential Film Pitch Series =

Presidential Pitch

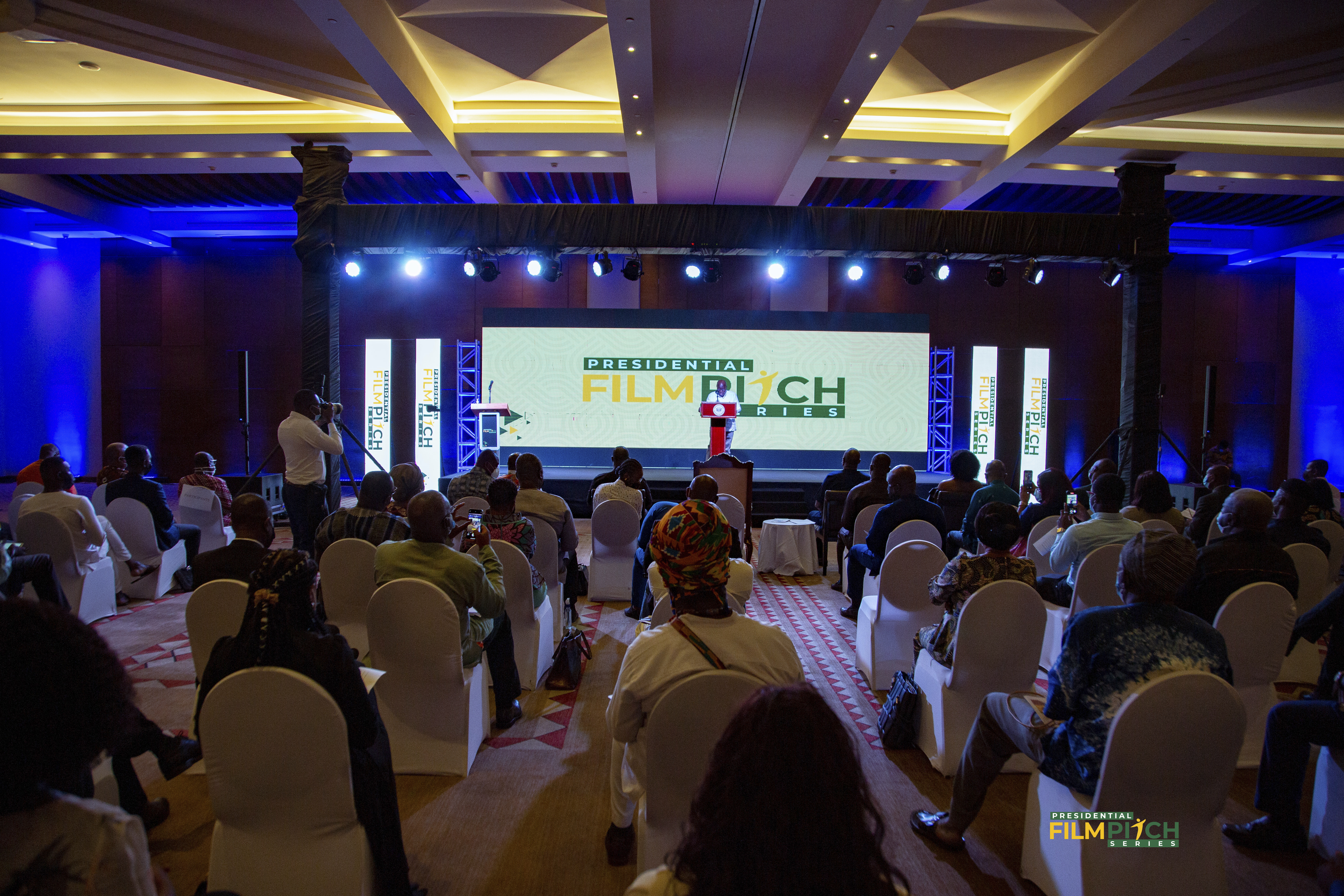
- Presidential Film Pitch Series at the Movenpick Ambassador Hotel
- Location: Movenpick Ambassador Hotel, Accra

The National Film Authority Presidential Film Pitch Series is a film program organized by the Ghana National Film Authority under the umbrella of the Ministry of Tourism, Arts, Culture, and Creative Arts aimed at reviving the Ghana Film Industry by creating an enabling platform for Ghanaian film producers with projects to engage with investors, distributors, and other international platforms for opportunities. The idea is for the industry to be able to contribute significantly to the economic development of the country. The Presidential pitch series was launched on April 28, 2021, at the Movenpick Ambassador Hotel.

== Overview ==
The NFA Presidential Film Pitch Series through the Ministry of Tourism, Arts, and Culture is expected to yield about 6,000 jobs and has urged film makers to also use tourist sites for films, according to Nana Akuffo Addo at the launch of the Pitch Series. He also added that the Ghana film industry is endowed with many talented players in the ecosystem and the government will continue to implement policies that will make the industry competitive and help create a vibrant market. The platform is also expected to create over 200 films and generate over 40,000 jobs every year.

In this first edition, 25 out of 100 submissions, including short films, series, games, and documentaries were shortlisted for the pitch series.
