= Kofi Middleton Mends =

Ghanaian actor (1939–2016)

- Born: 1939
- Died: 2016 (aged 76–77)
- Education: Mfantsipim School University of Ghana
- Occupations: Actor, lecturer
- Notable work: No Tears for Ananse

Kofi Middleton Mends (1939–2016) was a Ghanaian veteran actor who contributed to the growth of the movie industry.

== Career ==
He was an actor known for the role he played in 'No Tears For Ananse' and a commercial he played for Key Soap. He had his secondary education at the prestigious Mfantsipim School in Capa Coast and furthered at the University of Ghana, Legon. He was a lecturer at the University of Ghana and National Film and Television Institute.

== Filmography ==
- Grey Dawn (2015)
- This Bit of That India (1972)
- No Tears for Ananse (1976)
- The Other Side of the Rich (1992)
- No Time To Die (2006)

== Cause of death ==
He died of kidney failure at the Korle Bu Teaching Hospital in August 2016.
