= Khiabani =

Khiabani or Khiabany (Persian: خیابانی: "street", "road"); is a Persian language surname which in both of its Latin transcriptions (Khiabani and Khiabany) of the Perso-Arabic alphabet is also common among the Iranian diaspora. Notable people with the surname include:

== Khiabany ==
- Gholam Khiabany, Iranian-British media scholar

== Khiabani ==
- Javad Khiabani (born 1966), Iranian journalist, football commentator and television show host
- Mohammad Khiabani (1880–1920), Iranian Shia cleric, political leader, and representative to the parliament
- Mohammad Ali Modarres Khiabani (1878–1954), Iranian author, mojtahed and scholar
- Mousa Khiabani (1947–1982), Iranian politician
