= I Told You So (1970 film) =

- Directed by: Egbert Adjesu
- Written by: Egbert Adjesu
- Production company: Bam Nemsia
- Distributed by: Ghana Film Corporation
- Release date: 1970
- Country: Ghana
- Languages: English, Akan

I Told You So is a 1970 Ghanaian movie. The movie portrays Ghanaians and their way of life in a satirical style. It also gives insight into the life of a young lady who did not take the advice of her parent when about to marry a man. She did not know anything about this man she was about to marry, but rather took her mother's and uncle's advice because of the wealth and power the man has.

The young lady later finds out that the man she is supposed to marry was an armed robber.

== Plot ==
The movie portrays Ghanaians and their way of life in a satirical style. It also gives insight into the life of a young lady who did not take the advice of her father when about to marry a man she did not know anything about. She, however, took her mother's and uncle's advice because of the wealth and power the man had.

The young lady later finds out that the man she is supposed to marry was an armed robber. She was unhappy of the whole incident. When her dad asked what had happened, she replied that the man she was supposed to marry is an armed robber; her father ended by saying "I told you so".

== Cast ==
- Bob Cole as Kwasi Twii
- Margaret Quainoo (Araba Stamp)
- Kweku Cranston (Osuo Abrobor) as Akonta
- Billy Nuamah as Messenger
- Comfort Mensah as Grace
- P.J. Larbi as Plainclothes Man
- K.M. Hammond as Odikro
- Baba Buckle as Rosina
- J. K. Deheer as Jones
- Sarah Amissah as Serwah
- Faustina Ahia as Bar Girl
- Francis Appiah as Opanin Bentum
- C.K. Barnes as Tamewu
