= Ghana National Film Authority =

Film authority in Ghana

Ghana National Film Authority (NFA)
- Abbreviation: NFA
- Formation: 16 December 2016
- Founder: Parliament of the Republic of Ghana.
- Purpose: Governance, classification, and promotion of the film industry in Ghana.
- Headquarters: Behind Gold Coast Restaurant, GL-062-2197, Osu Ave Extension, Accra.
- Location: Accra, Ghana
- Fields: Film Industry
- Parent organization: Ministry of Tourism, Arts and Culture, Republic of Ghana.
- Website: https://nfa.gov.gh/

The Ghana National Film Authority (NFA) regulates, promotes, and supports the film industry across Ghana. Established under the Development and Classification of Film Act, 2016 (Act 935), the NFA aims to ensure the growth and sustainability of the film sector in Ghana.

== Key functions ==
According to the Ministry of Tourism, Arts, and Culture, the NFA (which is one of its agencies) was formed to perform the following functions:

- Regulation and Classification

The NFA is tasked with the classification of films, ensuring that content meets national standards and guidelines. This includes categorizing films based on suitability for different audiences.

- Promotion of the Film Industry

The NFA works to promote Ghanaian films both domestically and internationally. This includes supporting filmmakers in producing quality content and facilitating their participation in global film markets and festivals.

- Support and Development

The NFA provides support for the development of the film industry through funding, training programs, and workshops aimed at building the capacity of industry professionals.

- Policy Implementation

It ensures the implementation of national policies related to the film industry, coordinating with other government agencies and stakeholders to achieve cohesive industry growth.

- Advocacy and Representation

The NFA advocates for the interests of the Ghanaian film industry, representing the sector in negotiations and collaborations with international partners and organizations.

== Activities ==
The Ghana National Film Authority (NFA) has undertaken several initiatives under its core responsibilities, including:

=== Ghana Cinema Week ===
The NFA (in collaboration with Afrocinema+) introduced Ghana Cinema Week in 2022 as an initiative to promote cinema culture in Ghana. Following the timeline of the maiden edition, it is held annually in December. Below is a table of all the editions celebrated.

| Edition | Year | Date |
|---|---|---|
| Maiden edition | 2022 | 23–29 December 2022 |
| Second edition | 2023 | 15–22 December 2023 |

=== The Film Classification Criteria ===
The Film Classification Criteria is a specific system for categorising films based on their content, themes, and suitability for different audiences. This system assists viewers in determining the appropriate age group for each film and ensures that the content aligns with Ghanaian cultural, moral, and societal standards.

=== Black Star Films ===
This initiative involved the change of the name of the Ghana Film industry from "Ghallywood/Gollywood" to "Black Star Films". The re-branding aimed to showcase the cultural heritage of Ghana, gain global recognition, establish standardised naming conventions, and create a brand identity for the industry. The unveiling ceremony took place on 8 December 2021 at the Gold Coast Restaurant (Accra).

=== Africa Cinema Summit ===
The Africa Cinema Summit (ACS) is organized by the NFA (in collaboration with other stakeholders) to foster collaboration within the African film industry. The summit aims to bring together industry leaders and decision-makers to discuss the African cinema landscape, provide networking opportunities, highlight industry trends and opportunities, showcase African talent, and feature modern cinema industry technologies and services. The inaugural edition was held 14–16 November 2023 at the Movenpick Grand Ambassador Hotel, Accra, with the President of the Republic of Ghana in attendance.

| Edition | Year | Date |
|---|---|---|
| Inaugural edition | 2023 | 14–16 November 2023 |
| Second edition | 2024 | 7–10 October 2024 |

== Structure ==
The NFA is governed by a board that is appointed by the President of Ghana, according to Act 70 of the Constitution of Ghana. The board includes:

1. A chairperson (preferably a well-qualified film practitioner with notable experience and an expert in the Ghanaian film industry);
2. A representative of the Copyright Office (to be nominated by the Attorney-General and Minister for Justice);
3. A representative from each of the following sectors (to be nominated by the Minister of the relevant sector):
  - Ministry of Tourism, Arts and Culture; Ministry of Communications; and National Film and Television Institute;
4. A representative from each of the following (to be nominated by the organizations):
  - Ghana Actors' Guild,
  - Film Producers' Association of Ghana,
  - Ghana Academy of Film and Television Arts,
  - Women in Film and Television,
  - Collective Management Organization of Audiovisual Rights Owners,
  - Film Distributors and Marketers, and
  - Film Crew Association of Ghana;
5. A representative from the TV network (to be nominated by the TV stations); and
6. The Executive Secretary.

== See also ==
- Cinema of Ghana
- List of Ghanaian actors
