= No Tears For Ananse =

1968 Ghanaian movie

- Directed by: Sam Aryeetey
- Written by: Ato Kwamina Yanney
- Production company: State Film Industry Corporation
- Distributed by: Film One Ltd
- Release date: 1968
- Country: Ghana
- Language: English

No Tears For Ananse is a 1968 Ghanaian movie directed by Sam Aryeetey and written by Ato Kwamina Yanney.

== Plot ==
The folklore film describes how cunning Ananse tries to outwit his family because of the pressure of him providing for his family members every day. He pretended to be dead and he told his family to bury him in his farm. He then took to eating the food in the farm where he was buried. The family set a trap using a statue smeared with glue. When Ananse saw the statue he thought it was a living being so he started kicking and slapping it and he got stuck. The following morning he was caught by the family and villagers. This plot is related to the Ghanian tale "Why spiders live in the corners of walls" .

== Cast ==
- Kofi Middleton Mends
- David Longdon
- Lily Nketia
