= Home Sweet Home (Ghanaian TV series) =

- Genre: drama
- Starring: Rama Brew; Kojo Dadson; John Apea
- Country of origin: Ghana
- Original language: English

Original release
- Release: 2012 – present

Home Sweet Home is an English-language Ghanaian family television drama series that premiered in 2012 and is still running. This program portrays how a family relates to each other and the growth and the challenges they face.

== Cast ==
- Rama Brew
- John Apea
- Julia Apea
- Kojo Dadson
- Evelyn Addo
- Douglas Fish Bone
- Canelle Hope
