= Sam Aryeetey =

Ghanaian film producer

- Born: Sam Greatorex Aryeetey; August 23, 1929 (age 96); Accra, Ghana,
- Occupations: film producer; film director; editor; writer

Sam Greatorex Aryeetey (born 23 August 1929 or 1927) is a Ghanaian film producer, film director and writer. He is often credited as the director of the first Ghanaian feature film, No Tears for Ananse.

== Life ==
Sam Aryeetey was born August 23, 1929, in Accra. He was educated at Accra Methodist Boys' School and Achimota School. Among the first students at an Accra film training school for West Africans established by the Colonial Film Unit in 1948, Sam Aryeetey joined the new Gold Coast Film Unit under Sean Graham. In 1952 he moved to work as an editor in England.

In 1963, Sam Aryeetey returned to Ghana to work for the Ghana Film Industry Corporation (GFIC). No Tears for Ananse, written and directed by Aryeetey, was the first GFIC production. It was based on Joe de Graft's play Ananse and the Gum Man, a story about the trickster Ananse.

In 1969, Sam Aryeetey became managing director of the GIFC. Manthia Diawara has argued that, by choosing to employ Europeans rather than Africans to “make films for Ghana”.

== Works ==
=== Films ===
- (as editor) I Will Speak English, 1954
- (as editor) Mr. Mensah Builds a House, 1955
- (as editor) The Welfare of Youth, Editor
- (as editor) Sporting Life, 1958
- (as producer) Hamile the Tongo Hamlet, 1964
- (as director) No Tears for Ananse, 1965 or 1968
- (as writer) The African Deal, 1973

=== Books ===
- ‘’Harvest of Love’’, 1984
- ‘’Other Side of Town’’, 1986
- ‘’Home at Last’’, 1996
