= No Time to Die (2006 film) =

Ghanaian comic film

- Directed by: King Ampaw
- Written by: King Ampaw; Klaus Bädekerl
- Produced by: King Ampaw; Wolfgang Panzer
- Starring: Fritz Baffour; Kofi Bucknor; Agnes Dapaa
- Cinematography: Edwin Horak
- Edited by: Claudia Di Mauro
- Music by: Ben Mankhamba
- Release date: 2006
- Running time: 95 minutes
- Countries: Ghana; Germany
- Language: English

No Time To Die is a 2006 Ghanaian comic and romantic movie directed by Ghanaian filmmaker King Ampaw, and co-produced by Ampaw and German filmmaker Wolfgang Panzer.

== Premise ==
Asante, a funeral car driver in Ghana, needs a spouse but his work puts most ladies off. He begins to look all starry eyed at a customer (Esi) whose mother has passed on, and figures out how to win her over. Be that as it may, her dad precludes union with a funeral care driver. Asante continues and turns into the principal funeral car driver in Accra to get married. This movie was to explain the African culture showing the change in African funeral traditions due to the social impact of colonialism in Africa.

== Cast ==
- Fritz Baffour as Ofori
- Kofi Bucknor as Owusu
- Agnes Dapaa as Aba
- David Dontoh as Asante
- Emmanuel France as Safo
- Evans Oma Hunter as Kokuroko
- Issifu Kassim as Issifu
- Agatha Ofori as Esi
- Kofi Middleton Mends

== Production ==
The music was composed by Ben Michael Mankhamba a Malawian guitarist, singer, songwriter, and composer. The costumes were designed by Lisa Meier. It was produced in 2006 in Ghana and Germany.

It is an English language film of 95 minutes' duration.

=== Crew ===
The filmmaking crew included:

- King Ampaw (Director & Co-producer)
- Wolfgang Panzer (Producer)
- Claudia Sontheim (Co-producer & Line producer)
- Bernhard Springer (Executive Producer)
- Ben Mankhamba (Music)
- Claudia Di Mauro (Editor)
- Lisa Meier (Costumes)
- Michael Schlömer (sound)

== Release ==
No Time to Die was released in 2006.

It was screened at the Golden Tulip Hotel in Accra in January 2007.

It was later selected for screening in December 2016 at the African Diaspora Film Festival in New York City.
