= Heritage Africa =

1989 Ghanaian film

- Directed by: Kwaw Ansah
- Written by: Kwaw Ansah
- Produced by: Kwaw Ansah
- Production company: Film Africa Production
- Release date: 1989
- Country: Ghana
- Language: English

Heritage Africa is Ghanaian movie which was produced and directed by Kwaw Ansah in 1989.

== Plot ==
A young man called Kwasi Atta Bosomefi who is a public servant during the colonial period rose up the ranks because of his relationship with the colonial masters. He also changed his name from Kwasi Atta Bosomefi to Quincy Arthur Bosomfield, abandoned his culture and heritage and adopted that of his colonial masters.

== Cast ==
- Charles Kofi Bucknor as Quincy Arthur Bosomfield
- Ian Collier as Patrick Snyper
- Peter Whitbread as Sir Robert Guggiswood
- Anima Misa as Theresa Bosomfield
- Tommy Ebow as Keane Akroma
- Evans Oma Hunter as Francis Essien
- Martin Owusu
- Joy Otoo
- Suzan Crowley
- Pentsiwa Quansah
- Nick Simons
- David Dontoh
- Aileen Attoh
- Richard Hanson
- Joe Eyison

== Reception ==
The film was awarded the grand prize, the Étalon de Yennenga, at the 1989 Panafrican Film and Television Festival of Ouagadougou (FESPASCO), becoming the first film from an anglophone African country to win the award.

== See also ==
- List of FESPACO award winners
