= De Graft (crater) =

Crater on Mercury

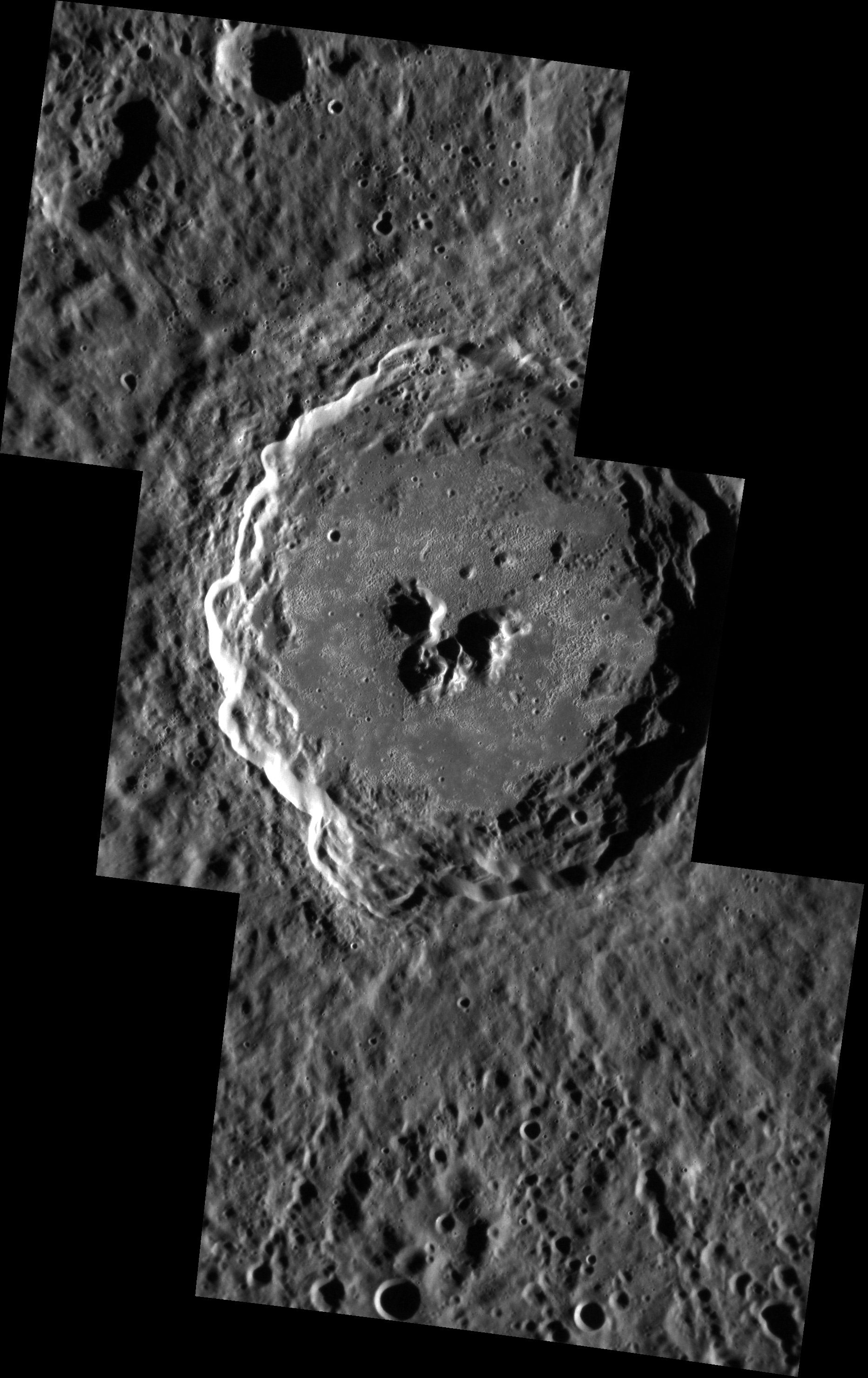
- MESSENGER mosaic of De Graft
- Feature type: Central-peak impact crater
- Location: Hokusai quadrangle, Mercury
- Coordinates: 22.05°N 358.11°W
- Diameter: 68 km
- Eponym: Joe de Graft

De Graft is a crater on Mercury. Its name was adopted by the International Astronomical Union in 2009, after Ghanaian playwright, poet, and novelist Joe de Graft.

Much of the floor of de Graft is covered in hollows.

De Graft is one of the largest craters of the Kuiperian system on Mercury. The largest is Bartók crater.

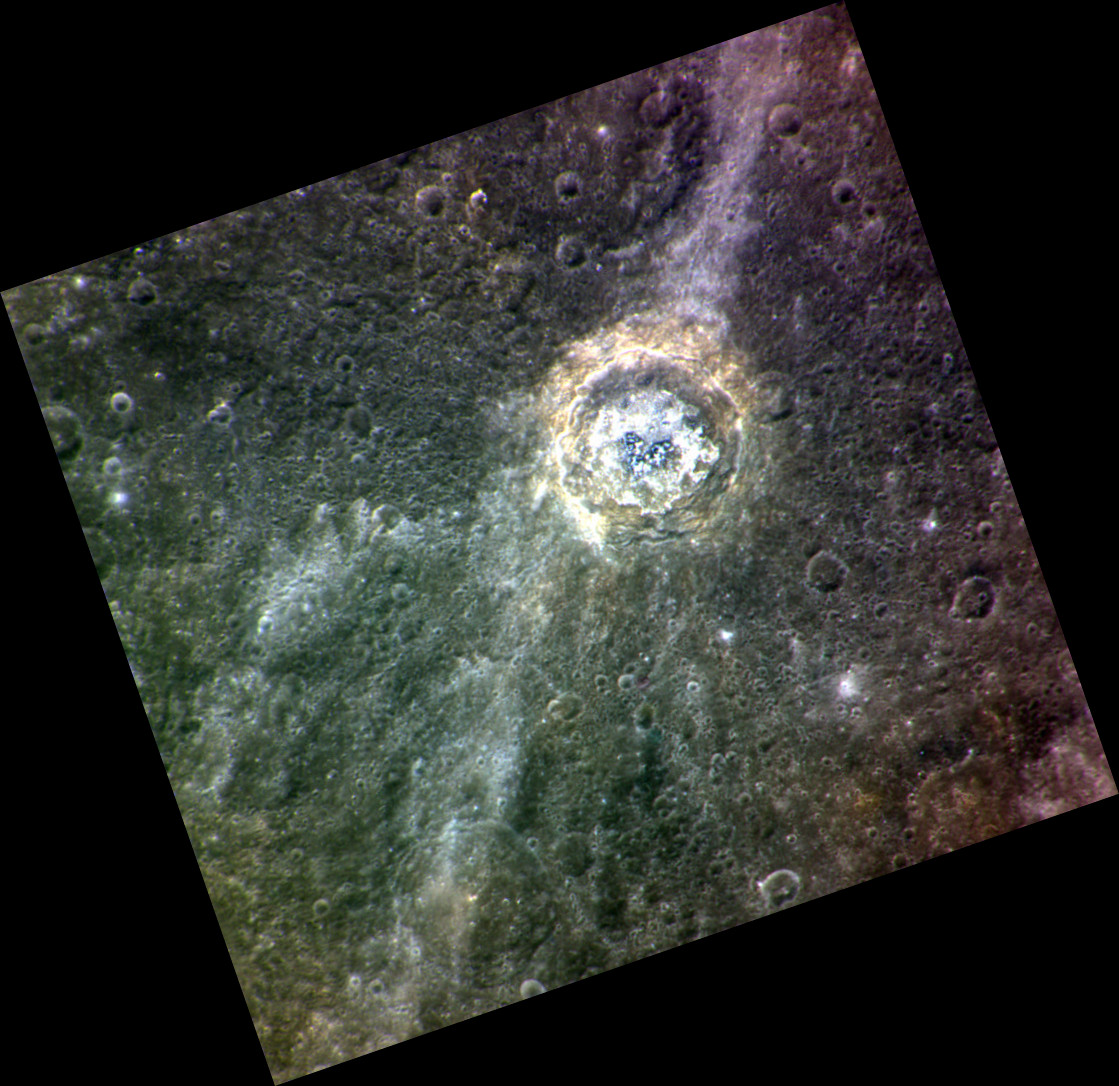
Approximate color image. The bright bands in upper right and lower left are rays from Hokusai crater far to the north.
