= Kojo Dadson =

Ghanaian actor (1953–2021)

- Born: Emmanuel Kojo Dadson; 1953; Tarkwa, Western Region, Ghana
- Died: 9 February 2021 (aged 68); Korle-Bu Teaching Hospital
- Other name: Dr. Luv
- Occupation: Actor
- Known for: Home Sweet Home, Doctor Love, Sun City
- Awards: Ghana Actors and Entertainers Awards (GAEA)

Emmanuel Kojo Dadson (1953–9 February 2021) was a veteran Ghanaian actor, director, producer, and musician.

== Biography ==
Kojo Dadson, a renowned Ghanaian actor, was born into a culturally rich environment that fostered his early interest in art. He was raised in Accra, where he attended some of the most prestigious schools. He then proceeded to London at the age of eight (8) with his siblings, where he continued his secondary education in a public school in Southwest England called Grenville College, which played a crucial role in shaping his career. Dadson’s passion for acting was evident from a young age, as he often participated in school plays and other extracurricular activities that honed his talent. His educational background provided a solid foundation for his later pursuits in the entertainment industry.

He is well known for featuring in and directing movies and series like Home Sweet Home, Sun City, and Run Baby Run. He gained prominence for his humor and comedic style of acting. He suffered a stroke whilst acting in 2012. He later died on the 9th of February 2021, at age 68.

== Acting career and breakthrough ==
Kojo Dadson was an actor who featured in a number of productions, such as

- Love Brewed In An African Pot
- Run Baby Run (2007) as Enoch Sarpong Snr.
- Home Sweet Home (2012) as Enoch
- Sun City (2003–2005) as Mr. Okpoti Aryee
- Hotel St. James
- Elmina (2010)
- Doctor Love (2012) as Dr. Love
- Location: Africa (1987)

among others.

Kojo Dadson's career in the Ghanaian entertainment industry spanned several decades, during which he became a household name. His big break came with the television series Home Sweet Home, where his portrayal of a father figure resonated with many Ghanaians. The show, which aired in the early 2000s, was a significant success and cemented Dadson's reputation as a versatile and beloved actor. His ability to embody different characters with ease made him a sought-after actor in both television and film.

In 2012, he suffered a stroke while acting on the set. The stroke affected his speech and confined him to a wheelchair. He also became a musician in the days when he couldn't move around much.

== Impact on Ghanaian television and film ==
Dadson’s influence on Ghanaian television and film is undeniable. He was part of a generation of actors who elevated the standards of local productions. His performances were marked by a deep understanding of the characters he portrayed, which contributed to the authenticity and relatability of Ghanaian storytelling. Additionally, Dadson’s work helped pave the way for younger actors and contributed to the growth of the Ghanaian film industry, making it more competitive on the international stage.

== Honours and recognition ==
Dadson was honored at the Ghana Actors and Entertainers Awards (GAEA) with a Legendary award along with six other veteran actors, including Grace Omaboe, and given plaques, citations, and an undisclosed amount of money for their service to the movie and entertainment industry in Ghana.

== Health challenges and resilience ==
In the latter part of his life, Kojo Dadson faced significant health challenges. In 2012, he suffered a stroke that left him partially paralyzed. However, his resilience and determination to recover were inspirational. Despite his health struggles, Dadson continued to be involved in the entertainment industry, though his appearances became less frequent. His battle with illness and his determination to persevere became a testament to his strength of character.

== Legacy and contributions ==
Kojo Dadson's legacy in the Ghanaian entertainment is remembered not only for his acting talent but also for his contributions to the development of television and film in Ghana. Dadson is celebrated as one of the pioneers who helped shape modern Ghanaian cinema.

== Death ==
Dadson died on 9 February 2021 at the Korle-Bu Teaching Hospital in Accra, whilst receiving dialysis treatment for kidney problems, two weeks after his wife had also died. His death caused an outpouring of tributes and messages from the Ghanaian media, West African media, and his fellow actors and actresses.

== See also ==
- Rama Brew
- Home Sweet Home
