= Elmina (film) =

2010 Ghanaian film

- Directed by: Redeemer Mensah
- Starring: Ama K. Abebrese; Akofa Edjeani Asiedu; Kofi Bucknor
- Release date: 2010
- Country: Ghana

Elmina is a 2010 Ghanaian film directed by Redeemer Mensah and was made in collaboration with Revele Films.

== Plot ==
The movie follows the people of Elmina, Ghana following the discovery of crude oil as they battle against corrupt multinational corporations.

== Awards ==
The film was nominated for an African Movie Academy Award in Nigeria in 2011, and voted number 35 on the Artinfo list of the 100 most iconic works of art from 2007–2012.

== Cast ==
- Doug Fishbone
- Kofi Bucknor
- Akofa Edjeani Asiedu
- Ama K. Abebrese
- John Apea
- Kojo Dadson
- Redeemer Mensah
