= Rama Brew =

Ghanaian actress and musician

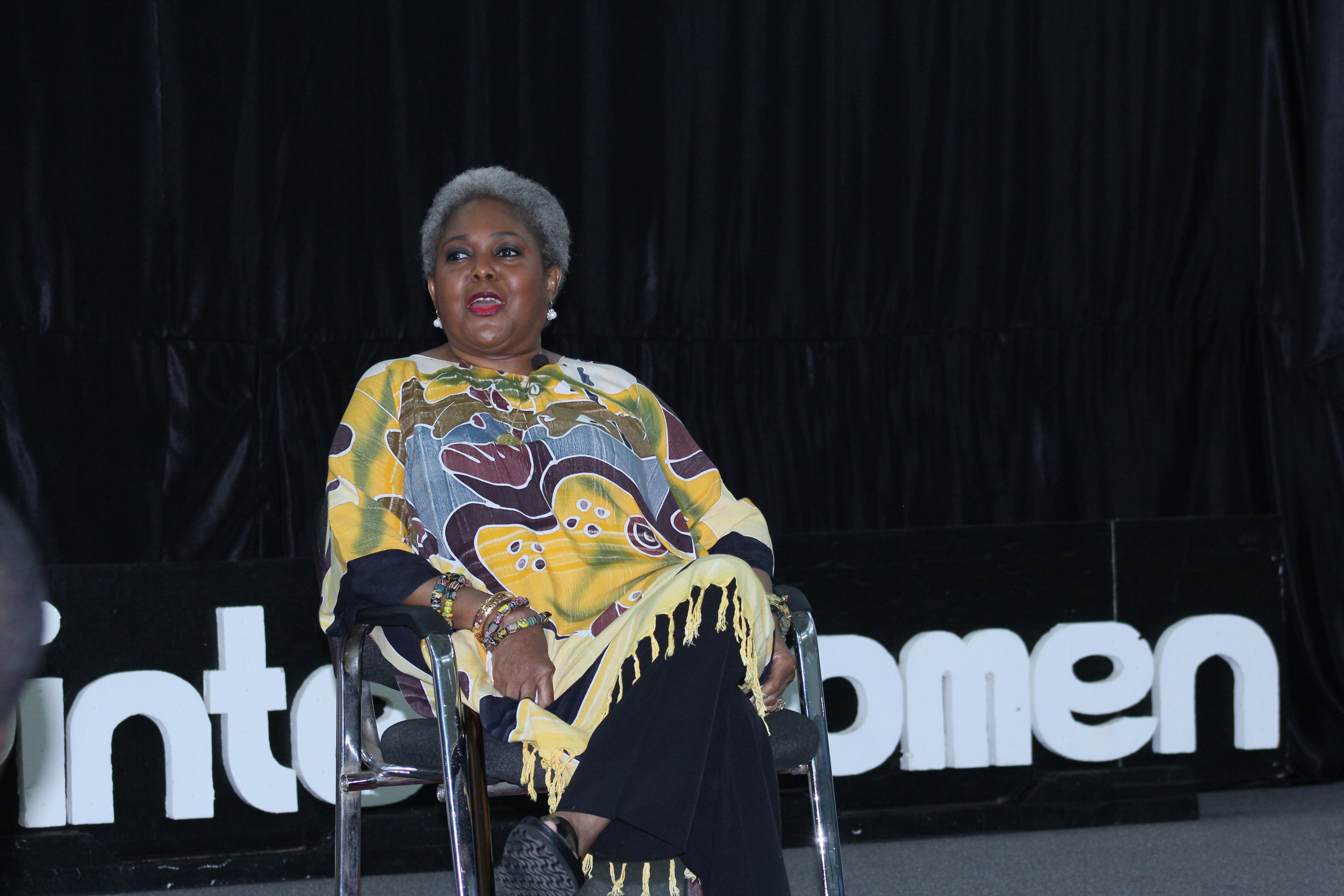
- Occupations: Actress, television personality and jazz musician
- Years active: 1972–present
- Known for: Avenue A, Villa Kakalika, Farewell to Dope, Ultimate Paradise, Home Sweet Home
- Children: Michelle Attoh
- Parent: Michelle Attoh

Rama Brew is a veteran Ghanaian actress, television personality and jazz musician.

== Early life ==
As a child Rama wanted to be a dancer but her father did not agree. She was then introduced to television by her aunt who worked at the Ghana Broadcasting Corporation(GBC).

== Career life ==
Rama Brew entered into acting in 1972. She starred in TV soaps like "Avenue A" and "Villa Kakalika”. Her first movie was " Farewell To Dope" for the then Ghana Films, known now as TV3. Rama became the lead in the "Ultimate Paradise" TV series in 1993 when she relocated to Ghana. She won best actress in 1994. Rama is also a jazz singer and one of the people who started jazz music in the 90's. She was a presenter for a kids show on the then 'Groove FM'. She later became a judge on the TV3 music talent show, 'Mentor'.

== Personal life ==
She has a daughter by the name Michelle Attoh who is also an actress.

== Filmography ==
- Home Sweet Home (TV series)
- The Cursed Ones (2015) as Village Elder

== See also ==
- Kojo Dadson
- Home Sweet Home
