= Hamile (film) =

1964 Ghanean film by Terry Bishop

- Directed by: Terry Bishop
- Produced by: Sam Aryeetey
- Starring: Joe Akonor; Kofi Middleton-Mends; Ernest Abbequaye
- Cinematography: R. O. Fenuku
- Edited by: Egbert Adjeso
- Production company: Ghana Film Industry Corporation
- Release date: 1964
- Running time: 119 minutes
- Country: Ghana
- Language: English

Hamile (also known as The Tongo Hamlet and Hamlet) is a 1964 Ghanaian black-and-white drama film directed by Terry Bishop and starring Joe Akonor, Kofi Middleton-Mends and Ernest Abbequaye. It was executive produced by Sam Aryeety for the Ghana Film Industry Corporation. It is an adaptation, in English, of Shakespeare's Hamlet performed by students of the University of Ghana School of Music and Drama, produced by Joe de Graft.

It was shown in Britain at the 1965 Commonwealth Film Festival.

== Plot ==
This version of Hamlet is set among the Frafra people of northern Ghana, with characters renamed, and some modifications to the dialogue. In the title sequence the film states:

The action of the play takes place in Tongo, the home of the Frafra people, who live in the far north of Ghana. The text is unaltered, except where it would not make sense in a Frafra community, or where an archaic word obscures the meaning.

== Cast ==
- Joe Akonor as King (Claudius)
- Kofi Middleton-Mends as Hamile (Hamlet)
- Ernest Abbequaye as Ibrahim (Polonius)
- Frances Sey as Queen (Gertrude)
- Mary Yirenkyi as Habiba (Ophelia)
- Kofi Yirenkyi as Laitu (Laertes)
- Gad Gadugan as Abdulai (Rosencrantz and Guildenstern)
- Fred Akuffo-Lartey as Osuru (Osric)
- Jacob Gharbin as Musa (Marcellus)
- Franklin Akrofi as Banda (Bernardo)
- Samuel Adumuah as Awudu (Reynaldo)
- Auhofe Okuampa as first gravedigger
- Shanco Bruce as second gravedigger
- Sandy Arkhurst as ghost

== Production ==
The film was shot near Accra, with the grave scene filmed in the University of Ghana's botanical garden; the production schedule was 30 days.

== Reception ==
Variety wrote: "This film (although set outdoors in a simple native court in flat, open countryside) is based on the stage production performed by the students of the University of Ghana School of Music and Drama, under producer Joe de Graft. Novelty value of the film makes it of interest to scholars and students, but as Shakespeare goes, it is all fairly tepid. The students speak their lines clearly and well, and may have been capable of better things under a director with some imagination. Terry Bishop, however, has no camera sense and the whole is recorded in a dull and stilted way. There is no rhythm or movement, no feeling for the drama and no culminating sense of tragedy. Only the ghost scene comes to life. It makes a good festival film, but its chances, even as a specialized booking in North America, are slight."

The Spectator wrote: "There is the freshness of meeting something as familiar as the text of Hamlet, not just in a new setting and costume, but with new voices and emphases and rhythms. There is the psychological satisfaction of finding how everything fits and can be translated into directly African terms ...Where the African landscape obtrudes, it brings the right touch of menace and the exotic; though mostly the film is rather stagily, statically made."

In 'Hamlet' and World Cinema (2019) Mark Burnett called the film "cinematically inviting and aesthetically remarkable."
