= Small Media, Big Revolution =

1994 book

Small Media, Big Revolution: Communication, Culture, and the Iranian Revolution is a book by Annabelle Sreberny-Mohammadi and Ali Mohammadi. First published by the University of Minnesota Press in 1994, it deals with how small media (leaflets and audio cassettes) played an important role in the revolution that deposed the Shah of Iran.
