= Sean Graham (director) =

German-born Ghanaian filmmaker

- Born: Hans Friedrich Hermann Isay; 26 June 1920; Berlin, Germany
- Died: 5 October 2015 (aged 95); London, England
- Occupations: Director, Producer, Writer
- Years active: 1951–1976

Hans Friedrich Hermann Isay (26 June 1920 – 5 October 2015), popularly known by his stage name Sean Graham, was a German-born Ghanaian filmmaker and former British Army officer. In cinema, he is best known for directing the critics acclaimed Ghana films The Boy Kumasenu, Jaguar and Two Weeks in September.

== Personal life ==
Graham was born on 26 June 1920 in Berlin, Germany, and fled with his family to Britain in 1933. He studied law at Peterhouse, Cambridge, and the start of the Second World War, he changed his name to "Sean Graham" for safety. He went on to serve and an interpreter with British army intelligence, gradually attaining the rank of lieutenant-colonel. He died on 5 October 2015 in London at the age of 95.

== Career ==
After the war, Graham became a film trainee alongside Paul Rotha at Elstree studios. In 1948, he moved to Ghana, where he spent ten years contributing to uplift the Ghanaian film industry. He made his directorial debut in 1952with The Boy Kumasenu, which was nominated for BAFTA Best Film. After a brief period in Tunisia, he returned to London to continue his work in Fil. In 1957, he directed and produced the critically acclaimed documentary Freedom for Ghana, followed by Two Weeks in September in 1957, which was screened in numerous international film festivals. He later lived and worked in Turkey making films for some years before finally returning to London.

In 2015, Government of Ghana conferred a State honor on Graham due to his pioneering work on Ghanaian cinema.

He was also the author of three novels: A Surfeit of Sun (Weidenfeld & Nicolson, 1964) and Hippo's Coup (Weidenfeld & Nicolson, 1968), both set in Africa; and The French Odalisque based on the life of Aimée du Buc de Rivéry (Orbach & Chambers, 2009).

== Filmography ==
Year	Film	Role	Genre	Ref.
1952	The Boy Kumasenu	Director, writer, Producer	Film	
1956	Mr. Mensah Builds a House	Director	Short film	
1957	Jaguar	Director, writer	Short film	
1957	Freedom for Ghana	Director, producer	Documentary	
1963	The European Economic Community	Director, writer	Documentary short	
1967	Two Weeks in September	Writer	Film	
1974	The Zoo Gang	Actor	TV series	
