= Egbert Adjesu =

Ghanaian film maker

- Born: 1931 (age 94–95)
- Citizenship: Ghanaian
- Occupations: Filmmaker; Producer; Director; Editor
- Notable work: 'I Told You So' (1970)

Egbert Adjesu (born in 1931) is a Ghanaian screenwriter and director best known for the 1970 film I Told You So, released in the post-colonial era.

== Life and career ==
Egbert, a native of Odumase Krobo, lived in London, UK for some time. While there, he worked with Pinewood Studios. Later when he was in Ghana, he worked the Gold Coast Film Unit, from 1952 and was made one of its first directors when it was changed to the Ghana Film Industry Corporation (GFIC) (Armes, 2008).

I Told You So was made under the support of the then GFIC, to explore the structure of orthodox storytelling and the aesthetics of the concert party theater for its formal quality (Ogunleye, 2014). The writing of a 1964 piece titled Hamlet, is also credited to him.

Egbert opined that cinema was used as a part of an intensive multi-media campaign propaganda to win the support of the natives for Britain. Through cinema, the colonialists in the then Gold Coast, now Ghana, disseminated information about World War II. This was done to gain the sympathies and garner the backing of the locals to contribute able-bodied men and other necessities in aiding the efforts of Britain in the war.

Along with Sam Aryeetey, Tom Ribeiro, and a host of other early filmmakers, the Ghanaian film industry was birthed.

== Filmography ==
- I Told You So
