= Joe de Graft =

Ghanaian writer, playwright and dramatist (1924–1978)

- Born: Joseph Coleman de Graft; 2 April 1924; Cape Coast, Gold Coast
- Died: 1 November 1978 (aged 54); Ghana
- Education: University College of the Gold Coast
- Occupations: Writer, playwright and dramatist
- Known for: First director of the Ghana Drama Studio

Joseph Coleman de Graft (2 April 1924 – 1 November 1978) was a prominent Ghanaian writer, playwright and dramatist, who was appointed the first director of the Ghana Drama Studio in 1962. He produced and directed plays for radio, stage and television, as well as acting, and was also a poet and educator.

== Biography ==
De Graft was born in Cape Coast, in the Gold Coast (present-day Ghana). His surname derives from a Dutch grandfather. He received his secondary schooling there at Mfantsipim. In 1953, at the age of 29, and after an education interrupted by four years teaching at his old school, de Graft graduated from the University College of the Gold Coast, one of the first undergraduates to take English Honours. That year, he married Leone Buckle, an accountant from Osu, Accra, and they subsequently had three children, Carol, Cobbie, and Kweku.

In 1955 de Graft returned to Mfantsipim School, where he taught English and was in charge of the Mfantsipim Drama Laboratory. A major influence on his work was Shakespeare, and he acted in, and directed, several of Shakespeare's plays. He was also responsive to developments in African theatre and was responsible for the Ghanaian premieres of plays by two Nigerian dramatists: James Ene Henshaw and Wole Soyinka. De Graft wrote plays himself, and one of the best known, Sons and Daughters (published 1964), dates from this time. It is a contribution to debates about careers and values among secondary-school pupils.

In 1960, de Graft was awarded a grant that enabled him to spend time in the United Kingdom and the United States observing amateur, professional, and university drama.

=== Ghana Drama Studio ===
In 1961, Ghana's prime minister Kwame Nkrumah opened the Ghana Drama Studio, founded by Efua Sutherland as part of a movement, the National Theatre Movement, to create artistic works relevant to Ghana and Ghanaians. Joe de Graft was seconded to become its first director. In 1961, his play Village Investment was produced at the Drama Studio. This was followed in 1962 by Visitor from the Past, a text that was revised and presented as Through a Glass Darkly some years later. Of another play, Sons and Daughters (1963, a study of conflict between generations), he said: "I was trying to make young people aware that their lives were important and could be looked at in this way, that they had a right to examine life as they saw it from their own perspective."

In 1964 de Graft produced a version of Shakespeare's Hamlet performed by students of the University of Ghana School of Music and Drama, which was filmed as Hamile.

In 1969 de Graft was appointed by UNESCO as a specialist in the teaching of English as a Second Language at the University of Nairobi. He spent almost eight years in Kenya and contributed greatly to the theatrical life of that country. He produced and directed plays for radio, stage and television; he also acted, playing Othello in both Shakespeare's play and Murray Carlin's post-colonial Not Now, Sweet Desdemona. He played the cameo role of Wilby in The Wilby Conspiracy. The 1975 film depicted the escape from a top-security South African prison of Wilby, the leader of anti-apartheid struggle, with the help of freedom fighter Sidney Poitier and reluctant Englishman Michael Caine, while pursued by relentless South African official Nicol Williamson. The Kenyan locations stood in for South Africa.

=== 1979 onwards ===
During the same year (1975), de Graft was commissioned by the World Council of Churches to write and direct a play for presentation at the African Challenge Plenary Session of the Fifth Assembly of the council. The result was Muntu, a broad treatment of African history from creation to the modern day. Muntu was published in 1977 and, like other de Graft texts, soon found its way on to secondary-school syllabuses.

Back in West Africa in 1978, as an associate professor in the Institute of African Studies at the University of Ghana, de Graft directed Mambo, his adaptation of Macbeth. Set in a fictional African country that recalled both Idi Amin's Uganda and Ghana herself, the radical adaptation showed how creatively de Graft was able to use Shakespeare.

On 1 November 1978, Joe de Graft died at the age of 54, while lecturing in the University of Ghana. His obituary in West Africa magazine stated that a younger generation of Ghana's writers "had learned to look up to him as a monumental figure, teacher and practitioner in one."

== Legacy ==
De Graft, a crater on Mercury, is named after him.

The Joe De Graft Students Drama Festival was launched at Mfantsipim School, Cape Coast, in February 2006, with the aim of "creating awareness among the youth in senior secondary schools on the importance of drama, as a tool for shaping their character".

== Bibliography ==
- Beneath the Jazz and Brass. Heinemann (African Writers Series 166), 1975
- Muntu. Heinemann (African Writers Series 264), 1977.
- Sons and Daughters. London: Oxford University Press, 1979.
- Through A Film Darkly. London: Oxford University Press, 1970.

== Filmography ==
Year	Title	Role	Notes
1975	The Wilby Conspiracy	Wilby Xaba	
