= Gholam Khiabany =

Iranian-British media scholar

- Citizenship: Iranian-British
- Education: University of Westminster (PhD)
- Known for: works on media and social change
- Scientific career
- Fields: media studies
- Institutions: Goldsmiths, University of London; London Metropolitan University
- Thesis: Iranian press under the shadow of the Islamic state (2006)
- Doctoral advisor: Colin Sparks

Gholam Khiabany is an Iranian-British media scholar and Reader in Media and Communications at Goldsmiths, University of London. He is known for his works on media in the Middle East and the relationship between media and religion.

== Career ==
Khiabany is mainly interested in the media and social change and the relationship between communication, development and democracy, multiculturalism, culturalisation of terror, the rise of the security state, and anti-Muslim racism. He is a member of Institute of Race Relations' council of management and an editor of the Middle East Journal of Culture and Communication.

== Books ==
- Iranian Media: The Paradox of Modernity, Routledge, 2010 ISBN 9780415962896
- Blogistan, with Annabelle Sreberny, I.B.Tauris, 2010 ISBN 9781845116064
- Media, Democracy and Social Change: Re-imagining Political Communications. Davis, Aeron; Fenton, Natalie; Freedman, Des (D. J.) and Khiabany, Gholam. London: SAGE Publications. 2020 ISBN 9781526456960
- Liberalism in Neoliberal Times: Dimensions, Contradictions, Limits (ed.), Goldsmiths, 2017
- After Charlie Hebdo: Terror, Racism and Free Speech (ed.), Zed, 2017
