= King Ampaw =

Ghanaian film director

- Born: 25 July 1940 (age 86); Kukurantumi, Eastern Region, Gold Coast
- Education: Hochschule für Fernsehen und Film München
- Occupations: Actor, filmmaker, producer
- Years active: 1972–present
- Notable work: Kukurantumi: Road to Accra (1983)

King Boama Darko Ampaw (born 25 July 1940) is a Ghanaian filmmaker and actor. He is known for many notable films, including his 1983 film Kukurantumi: Road to Accra and No Time to Die.

== Early life and education ==
King Boama Darko Ampaw was born on 25 July 1940 in Kukurantumi in the Eastern Region of Gold Coast.

He attended the Academy of Film in Potsdam, Germany, in 1965. In 1966 he enrolled at the Academy of Music and Performing Arts in Vienna, Austria. He studied at the Hochschule für Fernsehen und Film München (HFF Munich), Germany, from 1967 to 1972, where he studied with Wim Wenders. He graduated as a film director with his first film, They Call it Love.

== Career ==
After his return to Ghana, Ampaw became a senior director at the Ghana Broadcasting Corporation (GBC) from 1979 to 1982. Ampaw left GBC to form his own film company, Afromovies Ltd, in 1983.

He wrote, directed, and produced his own films, such as Kukurantumi: Road to Accra (1983), Nana Akoto / Juju in 1985 and Cobra Verde in 1987. He directed No Time to Die and co-produced it with German filmmaker Wolfgang Panzer.

Ampaw also a production coordinator on the film African Timber, directed by Peter F. Bringmann.

== Other activities ==
Ampaw is a founding member of FEPACI (Pan African Federation of Filmmakers), FESPACO, the Ghana Academy of Film and Television Arts (GAFTA), and the Directors' Guild of Ghana (DGG).

== Recognition and awards ==
He has been given several awards including the Film Critics Award for Kukurantumi at FESPACO in Ouagadougou, the Input Film Award for Juju in Czech Republic, the Talifa Film Festival Award in Spain for No Time to Die. Ampaw was also the first filmmaker to win an Honorary Award at the Africa Movie Academy Awards (AMAA) and received a Lifetime Achievement Award in 2013 at the Accra International Film Festival.

== Filmography ==
- Black is Black (1968, short film)
- They Call it Love (1972)
- Kukurantumi: Road to Accra (1983)
- Juju (Nana Akoto) (1985)
- Cobra Verde (1987)
- No Time to Die (2006)

== Personal life ==
Ampaw is married and has two sons.
