= The Boy Kumasenu =

- Directed by: Sean Graham
- Written by: Marc Silver
- Produced by: Sean Graham; John Wyllie
- Starring: Oku Ampofo; Rosina Ampofo; Arthur Ankrah; Robert Baffour; Angela Nanor; Nortey Engmann; Frank Tamakloe; Robert Nunoo; Guy Warren
- Cinematography: George Noble
- Edited by: Emiliano Battista & Gideon Gold
- Music by: Elisabeth Lutyens
- Production companies: Candescent Films; Motto Pictures
- Release date: January 24, 1952
- Running time: 1 hour
- Country: Ghana
- Language: English

The Boy Kumasenu is a 1952 feature film made in Ghana by a British film crew. It was produced and directed by Sean Graham from a script by Graham and John Wyllie. The score was by Elisabeth Lutyens. The movie became popular and had an impact on the social live of the people. It displayed signs of future potentials which made it become associated with anti colonialism and social change in the newly emerging independence Ghana.

== Production ==
The Boy Kumasenu was the first feature film made by the Gold Coast Film Unit, which sought to produce both educational and informative films for distribution in Ghana and abroad. The director was Sean Graham, who was a student of documentarist John Grierson, though Graham preferred to work more in the idioms of popular cinema. Musician Guy Warren was one of the actors, playing the role of Yeboah.

It was filmed in 1950 and 1951 in Accra, Kedze and Keta, with a non-professional cast, and edited in London. It was premiered in Ghana in 1952 but the makers had trouble getting it distributed in Ghana, due to a belief that Africans preferred escapist films. However, it subsequently proved very popular. It was awarded a diploma by the Venice Film Festival and had its British premiere at the 1952 Edinburgh Film Festival; it was also shown at the 1953 Berlin Film Festival. It was nominated for a British Academy Film Award for best film in 1953.

It was widely distributed in the UK and Ghana.

== Plot ==
The film tells the story of a boy called Kumasenu who moves to the city of Accra from a small fishing village, encouraged by his cousin Agboh's exaggerated tales of the wonders of city life. Hungry, he steals bread and is caught by police, but is rescued by a doctor and his wife, who find him work. Agboh attempts to get Kumasenu to rob the doctor, but Kumasenu foils his cousin's plans.

== Critical reaction ==
Variety praised it as "amazingly well done film fare" and suggested it could be an arthouse success. West African Review considered it dramatised an important issue facing African, and showed the ability of African leadership to solve Africa's problems. Monthly Film Bulletin was less impressed, finding it "vague and sentimental" though praising it as a starting point for African cinema.
