= Kukurantumi: Road to Accra =

Kukurantumi:Road to Ghana
- Directed by: King Ampaw
- Starring: Charles Ansong; Dorothy Ankomah; Sebastian Agbanyoh
- Release date: 1983
- Country: Ghana

Kukurantumi: Road to Accra was produced in 1983. It is said to be one of the first Ghanaian films to be aired on many European countries' television.

It was directed by King Ampaw.

== Cast ==
List of characters.

- Sebastian Agbanyoh
- Dorothy Ankomah as Mary
- Charles Ansong as Ofori
- Amy Appiah as Abena
- Samuel Kofi Bryan
- David Dontoh as Bob
- Kwesi France as Alhaji
- Rose Fynn as Seewaa
- Evans Oma Hunter as Addey
- Donkoh Kobina Joseph
- Felix Larbi as Boafi
- Emmi L. Lawson as Old Man
- Samuel Nyanyo Nmai
- Victor Nyaconor
- Kwame A. Prempeh
