= Annabelle Sreberny =

English academic

- Born: 5 September 1949
- Died: 30 December 2022 (aged 73)
- Occupations: Writer, scholar, professor
- Board member of: Director of the Centre for Media and Film Studies at SOAS

Annabelle Sreberny (5 September 1949 – 30 December 2022) was a writer, scholar, and professor of Global Media and Communication and Director of the Centre for Media and Film Studies at SOAS. Her writing covers globalization, communication, and culture with specific foci on international news and Iran.

== Politics ==
Sreberny was a Labour Party member of the Islington North Constituency Labour Party in Highbury East branch.

== Authored books ==
- The World of the News: The News of the World (University of Leicester, 1980)
- Small Media, Big Revolution: Communication, Culture, and the Iranian Revolution with Ali Mohammadi (University of Minnesota Press, 1994)
- Blogistan: The Internet and Politics in Iran with Gholam Khiabany (I.B. Tauris, 2011)
- Cultural Revolution in Iran: Contemporary Popular Culture in the Islamic Republic with Massoumeh Torfeh (I.B. Tauris, 2013)
- Persian Service: the BBC and British Interests in Iran with Massoumeh Torfeh (I.B. Tauris, 2014)

== Edited books ==
- Questioning the Media: a Critical Introduction with John Downing; Ali Mohammadi (Sage Publications, 1995)
- Media in Global Context : a Reader (Arnold, 1997)
- Gender, Politics and Communication (Hampton Press, 2000)
- International News in the 21st Century with Chris Paterson (John Libbey Publishing, 2004)
- Media and Political Violence with Hillel Nossek, Prasun Sonwalkar (Hampton Press, 2007)
