= Ernest Abbeyquaye =

Ghanaian filmmaker

- Born: Ernest Kofi Abbeyquaye
- Citizenship: Ghanaian
- Education: University of Ghana; National Film and Television School
- Occupations: Filmmaker; Producer; Director
- Notable work: A Mother's Revenge (1994)
- Spouse: Benedicta Abbeyquaye
- Awards: Television and Film Pioneer Award in London, UK under the GUBA Award

Ernest Kofi Abbeyquaye also known as Ernest Abbeyquaye, is a Ghanaian filmmaker who was a filmmaker, producer, and director for the Ghana Film Industry Corporation (GFIC).

His works have received recognition in both Ghana and abroad. These include 'A Mother's Revenge' (1994), 'The Other Side of the Rich' (1992), and 'Confessions' (1993).

== Personal life ==
Ernest Abbeyquaye is married to Benedicta Abbeyquaye and they had five children, one is deceased.

== Education and Career ==
Abbeyquaye attended the Arts Council Acting School in the 1960s and was a student in the pioneer class. He later graduated with a Major in Drama & Theatre Arts from the University of Ghana, School of Performing Arts. Between 1966 and 1970, he was a tutor of English, Literature and Drama. After pursuing postgraduate professional training between 1972 and 1975 in National Film and Television School in Beaconsfield, Buckinghamshire, UK, he later worked briefly with Samuelson Film Services Ltd., UK. He tutored in National Film Institute (NAFTI) in 1978, before becoming the Deputy Managing Director and first Head of Studies of the institute. Ernest also worked for some years with the Ghana Films Industry Corporation (GFIC) and rose to become the Executive Producer. His many features and documentaries, written and directed, have been showcased in Ghana and abroad. He filmed in other African countries (Nigeria, Sierra Leone, The Gambia and Eritrea). In the course of his career, Ernest has interviewed Academics, Military Generals, politicians, heads of States, farmers, market women, workers and children. As a UNESCO consultant on film and television use for rural development.

Other roles undertaken by Abbeyquaye include:

- Local co-ordinator for Yorkshire TV in Ghana, in the course of the production of "The Dying of the Light" (1992).
- Local fixer for Screen Two: "Deadly Voyage" (1996), an HBO-BBC production in Ghana.
- Director for “King Lions Law”, a 1995 stage musical and drama production.
- Co-director for a pilot production “Hopes on the Horizon” which was a Blackside (Boston) and Multi-Media Africa Production funded by the Ford Foundation.
- Director of a Ghana-Nigeria stage musical drama, “Fairy Tale Africa”, which was earmarked for a tour in the United States of America.

Some productions that Abbeyquaye has partaken in are; "Hamele: The Prince of Tongo" (actor), "The Chronicles of Odumkrom – The Headmaster" (director) and "No Tears for Ananse" (narrator).

Abbeyquaye works currently with Trumpet Africa Productions and Emerald Films.

Abbeyquaye along with some filmmakers, created the Ghana Academy of Film and Television Arts (GAFTA) in 2001.

== Award ==
Abbeyquaye was awarded in 2018 the Television and Film Pioneer Award in London, UK under the GUBA Award.

== Filmography ==
- A Mother's Revenge (1994)
- The Other Side of the Rich (1992)
- Confessions (1993)
