= Kwaw Ansah =

Ghanaian film maker (born 1941)

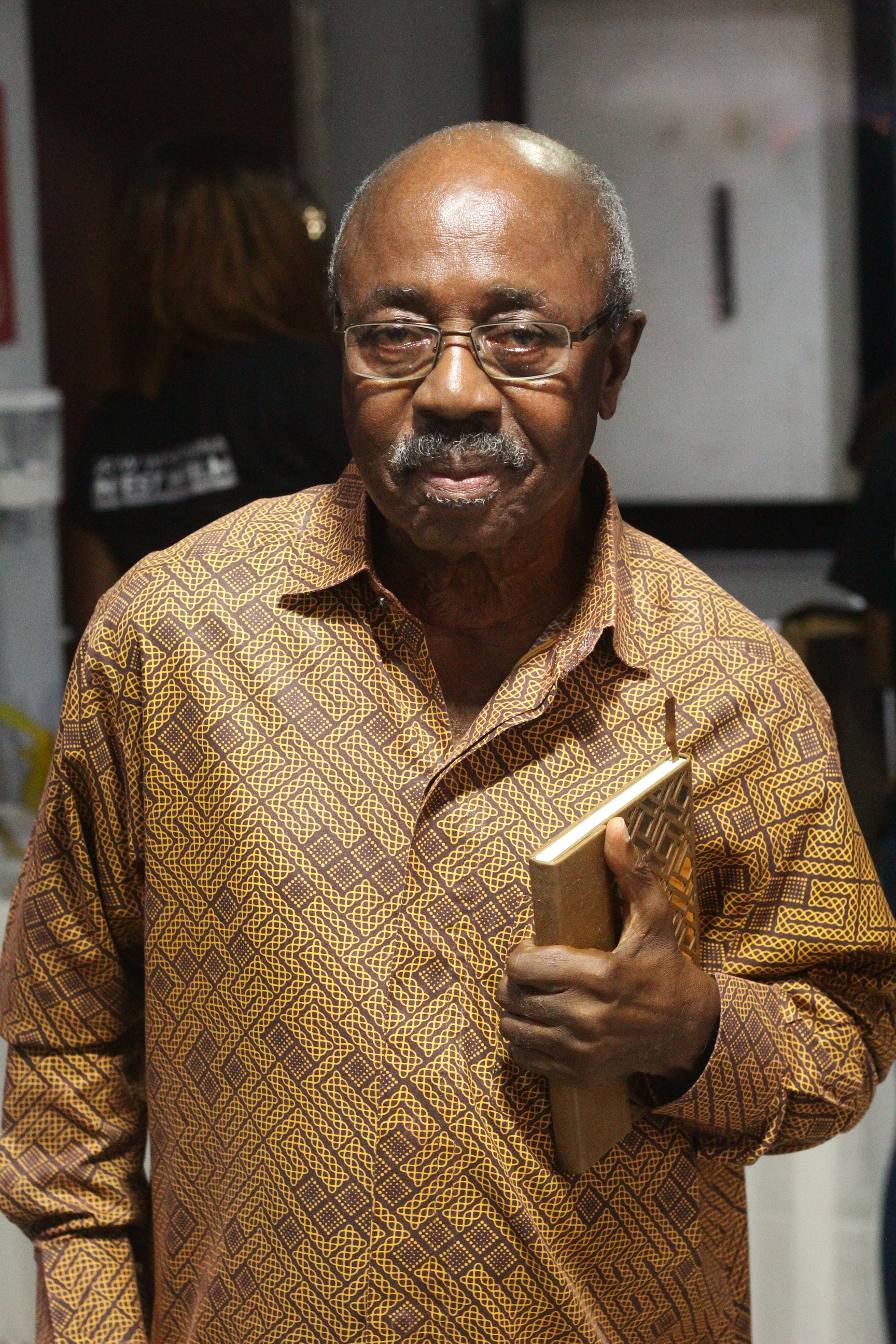
- Born: Kwaw Paintsil Ansah; 1941 (age 84–85); Agona Swedru, Gold Coast
- Citizenship: Ghanaian
- Education: Regent Street Polytechnic; American Academy of Dramatic Arts
- Occupations: filmmaker; production designer; theater designer; dramatist; music composer
- Years active: 1964–present
- Notable work: Love Brewed in the African Pot (1980); Heritage Africa (1989)

Kwaw Paintsil Ansah (born 1941) is a Ghanaian film-maker, whose work as writer, director or producer includes Love Brewed in the African Pot in 1980 and Heritage Africa in 1989. His first feature, Love Brewed in the African Pot, earned immediate popular and critical acclaim throughout English-speaking Africa. Despite all the awards and the success, it would be nearly 10 years before Ansah could complete his next major film project, the ambitious Heritage Africa (1989). Yet again, the film was widely acclaimed and awarded. Since then, Ansah has produced other films, including Harvest at 17 (1994), Crossroads of People, Crossroads of Trade (1994) and The Golden Stool, the Soul of the Asantes (2000). Ansah is a crusader for African filmmaking and dramatic art, working ceaselessly for improved funding and distribution of African films within Africa. He has been chairman of FEPACI and a leader in the direction of FESPACO. In 1998, Ansah was awarded the Acrag Prize, the Living Legend Award for Contribution to the Arts of Ghana.

== Early life ==
Kwaw Paintsil Ansah was born in 1941 in Agona Swedru, Gold Coast. His mother was a trader, and his father a trained photographer (as well as a painter, musician, and dramatist). After his initial schooling at an Anglican Mission School, Ansah studied for his O-Levels in the capital city of Accra, while working as a textile designer at the United Africa Company. He has expressed enormous gratitude for his success and development as a filmmaker to his father, who wanted him to engage in his own trade of photography. However, the young Ansah, having discovered his talent for drawing and painting, had other options.

== Education ==
From 1961 to 1963 he was enrolled in London's Regent Street Polytechnic, where he obtained a diploma in theater design. Following his education in England, he studied in the US, graduating from the American Academy of Dramatic Arts and the American Music and Drama Academy from 1963 to 1965. His first theatre play, The Adoption, was produced off-Broadway in 1964.

== Career ==
Upon his return to Ghana in 1965, Ansah found commercial work in both film and television. He worked for two years as a Production Assistant and Set Designer for the Ghana Film Industry Corporation, and also made commercials for Lintas Advertising Agency in Accra. He was the set designer for Egbert Adjesu's film I Told You So (1970). Ansah went on to found his own advertising firm, Target Advertising Services, in 1973. He continues to do commercial advertising work (his company is now called Target Saatchi & Saatchi Ltd), which, he says, "Pays The Bills". One of his television commercials won him a New York-based CLIO Award in 1989.

Along with his commercial work, Ansah continued his engagement with the world of theater and the arts. Soon after his return to Ghana he became an executive member of the Ghana Drama Association and the Ghana Association of Writers, and an officer of the Film Guild of Ghana. His play Mother's Tears was performed at the Drama Studio in Accra in 1967, and was instantly successful. It would later be reprised at the Accra Arts Centre in 1973, 1991 and at the National Theatre in 1995.

=== Love Brewed in the African Pot ===
Ansah founded his film production company, Film Africa Limited, in 1977, and began work on the project that would become Love Brewed in the African Pot (1980). It was an immediate popular success throughout English-speaking Africa, beating all previous attendance records for a film by an African director, while at the same time earning critical acclaim and respect. The film earned awards worldwide, including the prestigious Omarou Ganda Prize, for "most remarkable direction and production in line with African realities" at the seventh Pan-African Film Festival (FESPACO), the first to be awarded a film from an Anglophone country; the UNESCO Film Award in France, and the Jury's Special Silver Peacock Award, "For a Genuine and Talented Attempt to Find a National and Cultural Identity" at the 8th International Film Festival of India.

=== Heritage Africa ===
It would be nearly ten years before Ansah could complete his next major film project, the ambitious Heritage Africa (1989). Ansah struggled to find the money and corral the necessary resources. As was the case with Love Brewed, he had his hand in nearly all aspects of the film's production—even writing the theme music for the two films, along with directing, writing, and producing. He emerged from the experience with his health seriously compromised, but with an impressive, widely acclaimed film. Heritage Africa won the grand prize at FESPACO in 1989 (again, the first from an Anglophone country), the Organization of African Unity's Best Film Award, Outstanding Film Award at the 1989 London Film Festival, and numerous others.

=== Crossroads of People, Crossroads of Trade ===
Ansah's documentary Crossroads of Trade, Crossroads of People, made for the Ghana Museum and Monuments Board and sponsored by the Smithsonian Institution, now runs continuously in Cape Coast Castle, as part of a rather controversial effort to rehabilitate/renovate the slave forts and castles.

He has received several national, international and professional awards including The Order of the Nation of Burkina Faso (March 1995) for Arts & Culture; Best Documentary and TV Production Award for Crossroads of People, Crossroads of Trade (FESPACO-1995); The Grand Prix Award for Heritage Africa at FESPACO, Ouagadougou, 1989, which was the first from Anglophone Africa.

Ansah made a comeback after a while from active filmmaking in 2010 with the release of Good Old Days: The Love of AA (2010). Since then, he has made films like The Good Old Days: Papa Lasisi Good Bicycle (2011), The Good Old Days: Suffering to Lose (2012) and Praising The Lord Plus One (2013). At the first NAFTI Film Lectures in 2011 on the Ghanaian Motion Picture Industry, Ansah was honoured for his immense contribution to cinema. During that same event, he was also given the Osagyefo Lifetime Achievement Award by the Ghana Academy of Film and Television Arts (GAFTA).

In October 2014, Ansah launched a comic book based on his critical acclaimed 1980 film Love Brewed in the African Pot, the first film to be adapted into a comic book in Ghana. Ansah is a founding member of the Ghana Academy of Film and Television Arts.

== Filmography ==
- Love Brewed in the African Pot (1980)
- Heritage Africa (1989)
- Harvest at 17 (1994)
- Crossroads of People, Crossroads of Trade (1994)
- The Golden Stool, The Soul of the Asantes (2000)
- The Good Old Days: The Love of AA (2010)
- The Good Old Days: Papa Lasisi Good Bicycle (2011)
- The Good Old Days: Suffering to Lose (2012)
- Praising The Lord Plus One (2013)
