= Love Brewed in the African Pot =

1980 film by Kwaw Ansah

- Directed by: Kwaw Ansah
- Written by: Kwaw Ansah
- Produced by: Kwaw Ansah
- Starring: Anima Misa; Reginald Tsiboe; Emmanuel Agebenowu; George Browne; Emmanuel Dadson; Jumoke Debayo
- Cinematography: Chris Tsui Hesse
- Edited by: Tony Palmer; Bernard Odidja
- Music by: James Harpham
- Production company: Film Ghana
- Distributed by: Film Ghana
- Release date: 11 November 1980
- Running time: 125 minutes
- Country: Ghana
- Language: English

Love Brewed in the African Pot is a 1980 Ghanaian romantic drama film directed by Kwaw Ansah. It was reportedly the first privately financed Ghanaian feature film and is considered a classic.

== Plot ==
The film takes place in Ghana during the colonial period. Aba Appiah, a woman born to a family of privileged settlers, falls in love with Joe Quansah, a fitting mechanic and son of a simple fisherman. Aba's father, Kofi Appiah, a retired civil servant, is opposed to their marriage, which goes against his plans for his daughter, for whom he had already chosen a husband. This family conflict leads to complex and unforeseen consequences.

== Cast ==
- Anima Misa as Aba Appiah
- Reginald Tsiboe as Joe Quansah
- Emmanuel Agebenowu as Atta Quansah
- George Browne as Counsellor Benson
- Emmanuel Dadson as Kolo Appiah
- Jumoke Debayo as Araba Mansah

== Reception ==
The movie received positive reviews.
