= University of Media, Arts and Communication- Institute of Film and Television =

Ghanaian film school, formerly National Film and Television Institute (NAFTI)

The University of Media, Arts and Communication- Institute of Film and Television (UniMAC-IFT) (formerly the National Film and Television Institute (NAFTI)) is an educational institution in Accra, Ghana.

== History and operations ==
It was established in 1978 (47 years ago) by the Government of Ghana as a public institution of higher education in film and television production. Since its inception, the institute has offered professional and academic education in film and television education, in affiliation with the University of Ghana. It is a full member of the International Association of Film and Television Schools (CILECT).

It was announced in April 2016 that in the next few years, the institute will be converted into a media and creative arts university college.

== See also ==
- Cinema of Africa
- Culture of Ghana
- Education in Ghana
- Film school
- List of schools in Ghana
